= 1934 Temple Owls football team =

American college football season

1934 Temple Owls football

Sugar Bowl, L 14–20 vs. Tulane
- Conference: Independent
- Record: 7–1–2
- Head coach: Pop Warner (2nd season)
- Captain: Peter P. Stevens
- Home stadium: Temple Stadium

1934 Eastern college football independents records
	Conf.			Overall
Team	W	L	T	W		L		T
Tufts		–		8	–	0	–	0
Trinity (CT)		–		7	–	0	–	0
La Salle		–		7	–	0	–	1
Washington College		–		5	–	0	–	1
Franklin & Marshall		–		8	–	1	–	0
No. 4 Pittsburgh		–		8	–	1	–	0
No. 8 Colgate		–		7	–	1	–	0
Columbia		–		7	–	1	–	0
No. 5 Princeton		–		7	–	1	–	0
Duquesne		–		8	–	2	–	0
Holy Cross		–		8	–	2	–	0
No. 15 Temple		–		7	–	1	–	2
No. 10 Syracuse		–		6	–	2	–	0
Bucknell		–		7	–	2	–	2
No. 14 Army		–		7	–	3	–	0
Northeastern		–		6	–	1	–	1
Rochester		–		5	–	2	–	0
Dartmouth		–		6	–	3	–	0
Saint Anselm		–		6	–	3	–	0
Amherst		–		5	–	3	–	0
Fordham		–		5	–	3	–	0
Yale		–		5	–	3	–	0
Massachusetts State		–		5	–	3	–	1
CCNY		–		4	–	3	–	0
Providence		–		4	–	3	–	0
Drexel		–		4	–	3	–	1
Boston College		–		5	–	4	–	0
Bates		–		3	–	3	–	1
Middlebury		–		3	–	3	–	1
Penn		–		4	–	4	–	0
Penn State		–		4	–	4	–	0
Williams		–		4	–	4	–	0
Carnegie Tech		–		4	–	5	–	0
Washington & Jefferson		–		4	–	5	–	0
Villanova		–		3	–	4	–	2
NYU		–		3	–	4	–	1
Boston University		–		3	–	4	–	0
Colby		–		3	–	4	–	0
Springfield		–		2	–	3	–	3
Manhattan		–		3	–	5	–	1
Harvard		–		3	–	5	–	0
Vermont		–		2	–	4	–	2
Wesleyan		–		3	–	5	–	0
Brown		–		3	–	6	–	0
Geneva		–		2	–	5	–	2
Saint Joseph's		–		2	–	5	–	1
Cornell		–		2	–	5	–	0
Lafayette		–		2	–	6	–	0
Norwich		–		2	–	6	–	0
Bowdoin		–		0	–	6	–	1
Lowell Textile		–		0	–	7	–	1
Rankings from Associated Press

The 1934 Temple Owls football team was an American football team that represented Temple University as an independent during the 1934 college football season. In its second season under head coach Pop Warner, the team compiled an undefeated 7–0–2 record in the regular season, but lost 20–14 to host Tulane in the inaugural Sugar Bowl on New Year's Day in New Orleans. In their ten games, the Owls outscored their opponents 220 to 57. They were ranked in several post-season rankings: No. 6 by a national committee of sports writers assembled to choose the winner of the Toledo Cup; No. 8 in the Boand System; and No. 15 in an Associated Press poll of the country's leading newspapers.

The team featured one of the best backfields in program history in "Dynamite Dave" Smukler, Glenn Frey, Danny Tester, and Wilfred H. Longsderff. Smukler was the third-team fullback on the Associated Press All-America team. Other notable players included center Peter P. Stevens.

The team played its eight home games at Temple Stadium in Philadelphia.

== Schedule ==
Date	Opponent	Site	Result	Attendance	Source
September 29	VPI	Temple Stadium; Philadelphia, PA	W 34–0	12,000	
October 5	Texas A&M	Temple Stadium; Philadelphia, PA	W 40–6	5,000	
October 13	Indiana	Temple Stadium; Philadelphia, PA	T 6–6	18,000	
October 19	West Virginia	Temple Stadium; Philadelphia, PA	W 28–13	18,000	
October 27	at Marquette	Marquette Stadium; Milwaukee, WI	W 28–6	15,000	
November 3	Holy Cross	Temple Stadium; Philadelphia, PA	W 14–0	30,000	
November 10	Carnegie Tech	Temple Stadium; Philadelphia, PA	W 34–6	20,000	
November 24	Villanova	Temple Stadium; Philadelphia, PA	W 22–0	40,000	
November 29	Bucknell	Temple Stadium; Philadelphia, PA	T 0–0	30,000	
January 1, 1935	at Tulane	Tulane Stadium; New Orleans, LA (Sugar Bowl)	L 14–20	26,000	
