= 1934 Colgate Red Raiders football team =

American college football season

1934 Colgate Red Raiders football
- Conference: Independent
- Record: 7–1
- Head coach: Andrew Kerr (6th season)
- Offensive scheme: Double-wing
- Captains: Clary Anderson; John Fritts
- Home stadium: Whitnall Field

1934 Eastern college football independents records
	Conf.			Overall
Team	W	L	T	W		L		T
Tufts		–		8	–	0	–	0
Trinity (CT)		–		7	–	0	–	0
La Salle		–		7	–	0	–	1
Washington College		–		5	–	0	–	1
Franklin & Marshall		–		8	–	1	–	0
No. 4 Pittsburgh		–		8	–	1	–	0
No. 8 Colgate		–		7	–	1	–	0
Columbia		–		7	–	1	–	0
No. 5 Princeton		–		7	–	1	–	0
Duquesne		–		8	–	2	–	0
Holy Cross		–		8	–	2	–	0
No. 15 Temple		–		7	–	1	–	2
No. 10 Syracuse		–		6	–	2	–	0
Bucknell		–		7	–	2	–	2
No. 14 Army		–		7	–	3	–	0
Northeastern		–		6	–	1	–	1
Rochester		–		5	–	2	–	0
Dartmouth		–		6	–	3	–	0
Saint Anselm		–		6	–	3	–	0
Amherst		–		5	–	3	–	0
Fordham		–		5	–	3	–	0
Yale		–		5	–	3	–	0
Massachusetts State		–		5	–	3	–	1
CCNY		–		4	–	3	–	0
Providence		–		4	–	3	–	0
Drexel		–		4	–	3	–	1
Boston College		–		5	–	4	–	0
Bates		–		3	–	3	–	1
Middlebury		–		3	–	3	–	1
Penn		–		4	–	4	–	0
Penn State		–		4	–	4	–	0
Williams		–		4	–	4	–	0
Carnegie Tech		–		4	–	5	–	0
Washington & Jefferson		–		4	–	5	–	0
Villanova		–		3	–	4	–	2
NYU		–		3	–	4	–	1
Boston University		–		3	–	4	–	0
Colby		–		3	–	4	–	0
Springfield		–		2	–	3	–	3
Manhattan		–		3	–	5	–	1
Harvard		–		3	–	5	–	0
Vermont		–		2	–	4	–	2
Wesleyan		–		3	–	5	–	0
Brown		–		3	–	6	–	0
Geneva		–		2	–	5	–	2
Saint Joseph's		–		2	–	5	–	1
Cornell		–		2	–	5	–	0
Lafayette		–		2	–	6	–	0
Norwich		–		2	–	6	–	0
Bowdoin		–		0	–	6	–	1
Lowell Textile		–		0	–	7	–	1
Rankings from Associated Press

The 1934 Colgate Red Raiders football team was an American football team that represented Colgate University as an independent during the 1934 college football season. In its sixth season under head coach Andrew Kerr, Colgate compiled a 7–1 record and outscored opponents by a total of 188 to 38. The team's only loss was by three points to Ohio State Colgate was ranked as one of the top teams of 1934 by several selectors:

- In polling conducted in December 1934 by a national committee of 250 sports writers to determine the winner of the Toledo Cup, Colgate was ranked No. 7.
- In an Associated Press (AP) poll in mid-November 1934, Colgate was ranked No. 8.
- In the Boand System/"Azzi Ratem" results announced in December 1934, Colgate was ranked No. 9.
- In the Dickinson System rankings, Colgate was ranked No. 9.

Colgate end Joseph Bogdanski was selected by the North American Newspaper Alliance (NANA) as a first-team player on the 1934 All-America team. He was also selected by the Associated Press (AP) as a first-team player on the 1934 All-Eastern football team. Tackle Lewis Brooke also received second-team All-Eastern honors from the AP. Other notable players included halfbacks Marty M'Donough and Dick Offenhamer.

== Schedule ==
Date	Opponent	Site	Result	Attendance	Source
October 6	St. Lawrence	Whitnall Field; Hamilton, NY	W 32–0		
October 13	St. Bonaventure	Whitnall Field; Hamilton, NY	W 62–0		
October 20	at Ohio State	Ohio Stadium; Columbus, OH	L 7–10	29,139	
October 27	at Holy Cross	Fitton Field; Worcester, MA	W 20–7	24,000	
November 10	vs. Tulane	Yankee Stadium; Bronx, NY	W 20–6	40,000	
November 17	at Syracuse	Archbold Stadium; Syracuse, NY (rivalry)	W 13–2	34,000	
November 24	at Rutgers	Neilson Field; New Brunswick, NJ	W 14–0	11,500	
December 1	at Brown	Andrews Field; Providence, RI	W 20–13		
