= 1934 Washington College Shoremen football team =

American college football season

1934 Washington College Shoremen football
- Conference: Independent
- Record: 5–0–1
- Head coach: George Ekaitis (2nd season)

1934 Eastern college football independents records
	Conf.			Overall
Team	W	L	T	W		L		T
Tufts		–		8	–	0	–	0
Trinity (CT)		–		7	–	0	–	0
La Salle		–		7	–	0	–	1
Washington College		–		5	–	0	–	1
Franklin & Marshall		–		8	–	1	–	0
No. 4 Pittsburgh		–		8	–	1	–	0
No. 8 Colgate		–		7	–	1	–	0
Columbia		–		7	–	1	–	0
No. 5 Princeton		–		7	–	1	–	0
Duquesne		–		8	–	2	–	0
Holy Cross		–		8	–	2	–	0
No. 15 Temple		–		7	–	1	–	2
No. 10 Syracuse		–		6	–	2	–	0
Bucknell		–		7	–	2	–	2
No. 14 Army		–		7	–	3	–	0
Northeastern		–		6	–	1	–	1
Rochester		–		5	–	2	–	0
Dartmouth		–		6	–	3	–	0
Saint Anselm		–		6	–	3	–	0
Amherst		–		5	–	3	–	0
Fordham		–		5	–	3	–	0
Yale		–		5	–	3	–	0
Massachusetts State		–		5	–	3	–	1
CCNY		–		4	–	3	–	0
Providence		–		4	–	3	–	0
Drexel		–		4	–	3	–	1
Boston College		–		5	–	4	–	0
Bates		–		3	–	3	–	1
Middlebury		–		3	–	3	–	1
Penn		–		4	–	4	–	0
Penn State		–		4	–	4	–	0
Williams		–		4	–	4	–	0
Carnegie Tech		–		4	–	5	–	0
Washington & Jefferson		–		4	–	5	–	0
Villanova		–		3	–	4	–	2
NYU		–		3	–	4	–	1
Boston University		–		3	–	4	–	0
Colby		–		3	–	4	–	0
Springfield		–		2	–	3	–	3
Manhattan		–		3	–	5	–	1
Harvard		–		3	–	5	–	0
Vermont		–		2	–	4	–	2
Wesleyan		–		3	–	5	–	0
Brown		–		3	–	6	–	0
Geneva		–		2	–	5	–	2
Saint Joseph's		–		2	–	5	–	1
Cornell		–		2	–	5	–	0
Lafayette		–		2	–	6	–	0
Norwich		–		2	–	6	–	0
Bowdoin		–		0	–	6	–	1
Lowell Textile		–		0	–	7	–	1
Rankings from Associated Press

The 1934 Washington College Shoremen football team was an American football team that represented Washington College of Chestertown, Maryland, as an independent during the 1934 college football season. In their second year under head coach George Ekaitis, the Shoremen compiled a 5–0–1 record and outscored opponents by a total of 150 to 32. Former head coach Tom Kibler also remained active in coaching the team.

Fullback Bill Nicholson scored 50 points for the Shoremen in 1934 and was selected to the All-Maryland team. He later played in Major League Baseball between 1936 and 1953. He was inducted into the Washington College Hall of Fame in 1981.

== Schedule ==
Date	Opponent	Site	Result	Attendance	Source
October 13	Gallaudet	Chestertown, MD	W 51–0		
October 20	at Johns Hopkins	Homewood Field; Baltimore, MD	W 13–0		
October 27	at Mount St. Mary's	Emmitsburg, MD	W 12–6		
November 3	Susquehanna^{†}	Chestertown, MD	T 6–6		
November 17	at Haverford	Haverford, PA	W 39–14		
November 24	at Delaware	Frazer Field; Newark, DE	W 29–7		
^{†}Homecoming

== Players ==
- Charley Berry, halfback/end
- Al Bilancioni, end, 160 pounds
- Ellis Dwyer, tackle and captain, 190 pounds
- Ed Evans, halfback/fullback, 185 pounds
- Bill Greims, quarterback
- Wilbert Huffman, halfback/fullback, 190 pounds
- John Lord, center, 180 pounds
- Bill Nicholson, halfback/fullback, 190 pounds
- Jim Salter, end, 167 pounds
- Phil Skipp, tackle, 190 pounds
- Tignor, guard
- Ellery Ward, tackle/guard, 185 pounds
- Louis Wilmot, halfback, 155 pounds
- Gibby Young, quarterback, 145 pounds
