= 1934 Massachusetts State Aggies football team =

American college football season

1934 Massachusetts State Aggies football
- Conference: Independent
- Record: 5–3–1
- Head coach: Mel Taube (4th season)
- Home stadium: Alumni Field

1934 Eastern college football independents records
	Conf.			Overall
Team	W	L	T	W		L		T
Tufts		–		8	–	0	–	0
Trinity (CT)		–		7	–	0	–	0
La Salle		–		7	–	0	–	1
Washington College		–		5	–	0	–	1
Franklin & Marshall		–		8	–	1	–	0
No. 4 Pittsburgh		–		8	–	1	–	0
No. 8 Colgate		–		7	–	1	–	0
Columbia		–		7	–	1	–	0
No. 5 Princeton		–		7	–	1	–	0
Duquesne		–		8	–	2	–	0
Holy Cross		–		8	–	2	–	0
No. 15 Temple		–		7	–	1	–	2
No. 10 Syracuse		–		6	–	2	–	0
Bucknell		–		7	–	2	–	2
No. 14 Army		–		7	–	3	–	0
Northeastern		–		6	–	1	–	1
Rochester		–		5	–	2	–	0
Dartmouth		–		6	–	3	–	0
Saint Anselm		–		6	–	3	–	0
Amherst		–		5	–	3	–	0
Fordham		–		5	–	3	–	0
Yale		–		5	–	3	–	0
Massachusetts State		–		5	–	3	–	1
CCNY		–		4	–	3	–	0
Providence		–		4	–	3	–	0
Drexel		–		4	–	3	–	1
Boston College		–		5	–	4	–	0
Bates		–		3	–	3	–	1
Middlebury		–		3	–	3	–	1
Penn		–		4	–	4	–	0
Penn State		–		4	–	4	–	0
Williams		–		4	–	4	–	0
Carnegie Tech		–		4	–	5	–	0
Washington & Jefferson		–		4	–	5	–	0
Villanova		–		3	–	4	–	2
NYU		–		3	–	4	–	1
Boston University		–		3	–	4	–	0
Colby		–		3	–	4	–	0
Springfield		–		2	–	3	–	3
Manhattan		–		3	–	5	–	1
Harvard		–		3	–	5	–	0
Vermont		–		2	–	4	–	2
Wesleyan		–		3	–	5	–	0
Brown		–		3	–	6	–	0
Geneva		–		2	–	5	–	2
Saint Joseph's		–		2	–	5	–	1
Cornell		–		2	–	5	–	0
Lafayette		–		2	–	6	–	0
Norwich		–		2	–	6	–	0
Bowdoin		–		0	–	6	–	1
Lowell Textile		–		0	–	7	–	1
Rankings from Associated Press

The 1934 Massachusetts State Aggies football team represented Massachusetts State College in the 1934 college football season. The team was coached by Mel Taube and played its home games at Alumni Field in Amherst, Massachusetts. Mass State finished the season with a record of 5–3–1.

== Schedule ==
Date	Opponent	Site	Result	Source
September 29	Williams	Alumni Field; Amherst, MA	L 7–12	
October 6	at Bowdoin	Whittier Field; Brunswick, ME	T 0–0	
October 13	at Connecticut	Gardner Dow Athletic Fields; Storrs, CT (rivalry)	W 7–6	
October 20	Rhode Island State	Alumni Field; Amherst, MA	L 0–7	
October 27	Worcester Tech	Alumni Field; Amherst, MA	W 20–0	
November 3	Amherst	Alumni Field; Amherst, MA	W 16–9	
November 10	Northeastern	Alumni Field; Amherst, MA	W 37–0	
November 17	RPI	Alumni Field; Amherst, MA	W 32–0	
November 24	at Tufts	Tufts Oval; Medford, MA	L 0–6	
