= 1934 Boston College Eagles football team =

American college football season

1934 Boston College Eagles football
- Conference: Independent
- Record: 5–4
- Head coach: Joe McKenney (7th season)
- Captain: Dave Couhig
- Home stadium: Alumni Field

1934 Eastern college football independents records
	Conf.			Overall
Team	W	L	T	W		L		T
Tufts		–		8	–	0	–	0
Trinity (CT)		–		7	–	0	–	0
La Salle		–		7	–	0	–	1
Washington College		–		5	–	0	–	1
Franklin & Marshall		–		8	–	1	–	0
No. 4 Pittsburgh		–		8	–	1	–	0
No. 8 Colgate		–		7	–	1	–	0
Columbia		–		7	–	1	–	0
No. 5 Princeton		–		7	–	1	–	0
Duquesne		–		8	–	2	–	0
Holy Cross		–		8	–	2	–	0
No. 15 Temple		–		7	–	1	–	2
No. 10 Syracuse		–		6	–	2	–	0
Bucknell		–		7	–	2	–	2
No. 14 Army		–		7	–	3	–	0
Northeastern		–		6	–	1	–	1
Rochester		–		5	–	2	–	0
Dartmouth		–		6	–	3	–	0
Saint Anselm		–		6	–	3	–	0
Amherst		–		5	–	3	–	0
Fordham		–		5	–	3	–	0
Yale		–		5	–	3	–	0
Massachusetts State		–		5	–	3	–	1
CCNY		–		4	–	3	–	0
Providence		–		4	–	3	–	0
Drexel		–		4	–	3	–	1
Boston College		–		5	–	4	–	0
Bates		–		3	–	3	–	1
Middlebury		–		3	–	3	–	1
Penn		–		4	–	4	–	0
Penn State		–		4	–	4	–	0
Williams		–		4	–	4	–	0
Carnegie Tech		–		4	–	5	–	0
Washington & Jefferson		–		4	–	5	–	0
Villanova		–		3	–	4	–	2
NYU		–		3	–	4	–	1
Boston University		–		3	–	4	–	0
Colby		–		3	–	4	–	0
Springfield		–		2	–	3	–	3
Manhattan		–		3	–	5	–	1
Harvard		–		3	–	5	–	0
Vermont		–		2	–	4	–	2
Wesleyan		–		3	–	5	–	0
Brown		–		3	–	6	–	0
Geneva		–		2	–	5	–	2
Saint Joseph's		–		2	–	5	–	1
Cornell		–		2	–	5	–	0
Lafayette		–		2	–	6	–	0
Norwich		–		2	–	6	–	0
Bowdoin		–		0	–	6	–	1
Lowell Textile		–		0	–	7	–	1
Rankings from Associated Press

The 1934 Boston College Eagles football team represented Boston College as an independent during the 1934 college football season. The Eagles were led by seventh-year head coach Joe McKenney and played their home games at Alumni Field in Chestnut Hill, Massachusetts. The team finished with a record of 5–4. At the conclusion of the season, McKenney resigned as head coach, seemingly at the height of his career at 30 years old, to accept a position as assistant director of physical education for Boston Public Schools. McKenney was 44–18–3 while serving as head coach of Boston College.

== Schedule ==
Date	Time	Opponent	Site	Result	Attendance	Source
September 29		Saint Anselm	Alumni Field; Chestnut Hill, MA	W 18–6		
October 6		at Springfield	Springfield, MA	W 14–0		
October 12		Fordham	Alumni Field; Chestnut Hill, MA	L 0–6	22,000	
October 20		vs. Western Maryland	Baltimore Stadium; Baltimore, MD	L 19–6	10,300	
October 27		Providence	Alumni Field; Chestnut Hill, MA	L 7–13		
November 3		Villanova	Alumni Field; Chestnut Hill, MA	W 6–0		
November 12	2:00 p.m.	Centre	Alumni Field; Chestnut Hill, MA	W 7–0	12,000–20,000	
November 17		Boston University	Alumni Field; Chestnut Hill, MA (rivalry)	W 10–0	10,000	
December 1		Holy Cross	Alumni Field; Chestnut Hill, MA (rivalry)	L 2–7	18,000	
All times are in Eastern time
