= 1934 Trinity Hilltoppers football team =

American college football season

1934 Trinity Hilltoppers football
- Conference: Independent
- Record: 7–0
- Head coach: Dan Jessee (3rd season)
- Captain: J. J. Maher
- Home stadium: Trinity Field

1934 Eastern college football independents records
	Conf.			Overall
Team	W	L	T	W		L		T
Tufts		–		8	–	0	–	0
Trinity (CT)		–		7	–	0	–	0
La Salle		–		7	–	0	–	1
Washington College		–		5	–	0	–	1
Franklin & Marshall		–		8	–	1	–	0
No. 4 Pittsburgh		–		8	–	1	–	0
No. 8 Colgate		–		7	–	1	–	0
Columbia		–		7	–	1	–	0
No. 5 Princeton		–		7	–	1	–	0
Duquesne		–		8	–	2	–	0
Holy Cross		–		8	–	2	–	0
No. 15 Temple		–		7	–	1	–	2
No. 10 Syracuse		–		6	–	2	–	0
Bucknell		–		7	–	2	–	2
No. 14 Army		–		7	–	3	–	0
Northeastern		–		6	–	1	–	1
Rochester		–		5	–	2	–	0
Dartmouth		–		6	–	3	–	0
Saint Anselm		–		6	–	3	–	0
Amherst		–		5	–	3	–	0
Fordham		–		5	–	3	–	0
Yale		–		5	–	3	–	0
Massachusetts State		–		5	–	3	–	1
CCNY		–		4	–	3	–	0
Providence		–		4	–	3	–	0
Drexel		–		4	–	3	–	1
Boston College		–		5	–	4	–	0
Bates		–		3	–	3	–	1
Middlebury		–		3	–	3	–	1
Penn		–		4	–	4	–	0
Penn State		–		4	–	4	–	0
Williams		–		4	–	4	–	0
Carnegie Tech		–		4	–	5	–	0
Washington & Jefferson		–		4	–	5	–	0
Villanova		–		3	–	4	–	2
NYU		–		3	–	4	–	1
Boston University		–		3	–	4	–	0
Colby		–		3	–	4	–	0
Springfield		–		2	–	3	–	3
Manhattan		–		3	–	5	–	1
Harvard		–		3	–	5	–	0
Vermont		–		2	–	4	–	2
Wesleyan		–		3	–	5	–	0
Brown		–		3	–	6	–	0
Geneva		–		2	–	5	–	2
Saint Joseph's		–		2	–	5	–	1
Cornell		–		2	–	5	–	0
Lafayette		–		2	–	6	–	0
Norwich		–		2	–	6	–	0
Bowdoin		–		0	–	6	–	1
Lowell Textile		–		0	–	7	–	1
Rankings from Associated Press

The 1934 Trinity Hilltoppers football team was an American football team that represented Trinity College during the 1934 college football season. In its third season under head coach Dan Jessee, the team compiled a perfect 7–0 record, shut out five opponents, and outscored all opponents by a total of 187 to 13. Halfback Mickey Kobrosky was the team's star ball carrier. The team played its home games at Trinity Field in Hartford, Connecticut.

== Schedule ==
Date	Opponent	Site	Result	Attendance	Source
September 29	Hartwick	Trinity Field; Hartford, CT	W 39–0		
October 6	RPI	Trinity Field; Hartford, CT	W 27–0		
October 13	at Worcester Tech	Worcester, MA	W 34–0		
October 20	at Coast Guard	New London, CT	W 14–6		
October 27	Connecticut State	Trinity Field; Hartford, CT	W 25–0		
November 3	Wesleyan	Trinity Field; Hartford, CT (rivalry)	W 27–0	> 4,000	
November 10	at Vermont	Burlington, VT	W 21–7	4,000	
