= 1934 CCNY Beavers football team =

American college football season

1934 CCNY Beavers football
- Conference: Independent
- Record: 4–3
- Head coach: Benny Friedman (1st season)
- Home stadium: Lewisohn Stadium

1934 Eastern college football independents records
	Conf.			Overall
Team	W	L	T	W		L		T
Tufts		–		8	–	0	–	0
Trinity (CT)		–		7	–	0	–	0
La Salle		–		7	–	0	–	1
Washington College		–		5	–	0	–	1
Franklin & Marshall		–		8	–	1	–	0
No. 4 Pittsburgh		–		8	–	1	–	0
No. 8 Colgate		–		7	–	1	–	0
Columbia		–		7	–	1	–	0
No. 5 Princeton		–		7	–	1	–	0
Duquesne		–		8	–	2	–	0
Holy Cross		–		8	–	2	–	0
No. 15 Temple		–		7	–	1	–	2
No. 10 Syracuse		–		6	–	2	–	0
Bucknell		–		7	–	2	–	2
No. 14 Army		–		7	–	3	–	0
Northeastern		–		6	–	1	–	1
Rochester		–		5	–	2	–	0
Dartmouth		–		6	–	3	–	0
Saint Anselm		–		6	–	3	–	0
Amherst		–		5	–	3	–	0
Fordham		–		5	–	3	–	0
Yale		–		5	–	3	–	0
Massachusetts State		–		5	–	3	–	1
CCNY		–		4	–	3	–	0
Providence		–		4	–	3	–	0
Drexel		–		4	–	3	–	1
Boston College		–		5	–	4	–	0
Bates		–		3	–	3	–	1
Middlebury		–		3	–	3	–	1
Penn		–		4	–	4	–	0
Penn State		–		4	–	4	–	0
Williams		–		4	–	4	–	0
Carnegie Tech		–		4	–	5	–	0
Washington & Jefferson		–		4	–	5	–	0
Villanova		–		3	–	4	–	2
NYU		–		3	–	4	–	1
Boston University		–		3	–	4	–	0
Colby		–		3	–	4	–	0
Springfield		–		2	–	3	–	3
Manhattan		–		3	–	5	–	1
Harvard		–		3	–	5	–	0
Vermont		–		2	–	4	–	2
Wesleyan		–		3	–	5	–	0
Brown		–		3	–	6	–	0
Geneva		–		2	–	5	–	2
Saint Joseph's		–		2	–	5	–	1
Cornell		–		2	–	5	–	0
Lafayette		–		2	–	6	–	0
Norwich		–		2	–	6	–	0
Bowdoin		–		0	–	6	–	1
Lowell Textile		–		0	–	7	–	1
Rankings from Associated Press

The 1934 CCNY Beavers football team was an American football team that represented the City College of New York (CCNY) as an independent during the 1934 college football season. In their first season under Benny Friedman, the team compiled a 4–3 record.

== Schedule ==
Date	Opponent	Site	Result	Attendance	Source
September 29	Brooklyn	Lewisohn Stadium; New York, NY	W 18–0	5,000	
October 6	Baltimore	Lewisohn Stadium; New York, NY	W 31–0	5,000	
October 13	at Providence	Cycledrome; Providence, RI	L 6–19	800	
October 20	at Lowell Textile	Lowell, MA	W 20–6		
October 27	Drexel	Lewisohn Stadium; New York, NY	W 12–7		
November 3	at Manhattan	Ebbets Field; Brooklyn, NY	L 0–21	15,000	
November 10	at NYU	Ohio Field; Bronx, NY	L 13–38	14,000	
