= 1934 La Salle Explorers football team =

American college football season

1934 La Salle Explorers football
- Conference: Independent
- Record: 7–0–1
- Head coach: Marty Brill (2nd season)
- Home stadium: Philadelphia Ball Park; Temple Stadium

1934 Eastern college football independents records
	Conf.			Overall
Team	W	L	T	W		L		T
Tufts		–		8	–	0	–	0
Trinity (CT)		–		7	–	0	–	0
La Salle		–		7	–	0	–	1
Washington College		–		5	–	0	–	1
Franklin & Marshall		–		8	–	1	–	0
No. 4 Pittsburgh		–		8	–	1	–	0
No. 8 Colgate		–		7	–	1	–	0
Columbia		–		7	–	1	–	0
No. 5 Princeton		–		7	–	1	–	0
Duquesne		–		8	–	2	–	0
Holy Cross		–		8	–	2	–	0
No. 15 Temple		–		7	–	1	–	2
No. 10 Syracuse		–		6	–	2	–	0
Bucknell		–		7	–	2	–	2
No. 14 Army		–		7	–	3	–	0
Northeastern		–		6	–	1	–	1
Rochester		–		5	–	2	–	0
Dartmouth		–		6	–	3	–	0
Saint Anselm		–		6	–	3	–	0
Amherst		–		5	–	3	–	0
Fordham		–		5	–	3	–	0
Yale		–		5	–	3	–	0
Massachusetts State		–		5	–	3	–	1
CCNY		–		4	–	3	–	0
Providence		–		4	–	3	–	0
Drexel		–		4	–	3	–	1
Boston College		–		5	–	4	–	0
Bates		–		3	–	3	–	1
Middlebury		–		3	–	3	–	1
Penn		–		4	–	4	–	0
Penn State		–		4	–	4	–	0
Williams		–		4	–	4	–	0
Carnegie Tech		–		4	–	5	–	0
Washington & Jefferson		–		4	–	5	–	0
Villanova		–		3	–	4	–	2
NYU		–		3	–	4	–	1
Boston University		–		3	–	4	–	0
Colby		–		3	–	4	–	0
Springfield		–		2	–	3	–	3
Manhattan		–		3	–	5	–	1
Harvard		–		3	–	5	–	0
Vermont		–		2	–	4	–	2
Wesleyan		–		3	–	5	–	0
Brown		–		3	–	6	–	0
Geneva		–		2	–	5	–	2
Saint Joseph's		–		2	–	5	–	1
Cornell		–		2	–	5	–	0
Lafayette		–		2	–	6	–	0
Norwich		–		2	–	6	–	0
Bowdoin		–		0	–	6	–	1
Lowell Textile		–		0	–	7	–	1
Rankings from Associated Press

The 1934 La Salle Explorers football team was an American football team that represented La Salle University of Philadelphia as an independent during the 1934 college football season. In their second year under head coach Marty Brill, the Explorers compiled a 7–0–1 record, shut out four of eight opponents, and outscored all opponents by a total of 120 to 20.

The team played its home games at the Philadelphia Ball Park (two games) and Temple Stadium (one game) in Philadelphia.

== Schedule ==
Date	Opponent	Site	Result	Attendance	Source
September 30	at St. Thomas (PA)	Athletic Field; Scranton, PA	W 7–0	4,000	
October 6	at Catholic University	Brookland Stadium; Washington, DC	T 6–6	3,500	
October 13	at Villanova	Villanova Stadium; Villanova, PA	W 13–6	8,000	
October 20	Saint Joseph's	Philadelphia Ball Park; Philadelphia, PA	W 7–0		
October 27	at West Chester	Wayne Field; West Chester, PA	W 6–0	3,000	
November 10	at Albright	Albright Stadium; Reading, PA	W 27–0		
November 17	Saint Vincent (PA)	Temple Stadium; Philadelphia, PA	W 13–6	5,000	
November 24	Mount St. Mary's	Philadelphia Ball Park; Philadelphia, PA	W 41–2	3,000	
