= 1934 Fordham Rams football team =

American college football season

1934 Fordham Rams football
- Conference: Independent
- Record: 5–3
- Head coach: Jim Crowley (2nd season)
- Captain: Lester Borden
- Home stadium: Polo Grounds, Yankee Stadium

1934 Eastern college football independents records
| | Conf. | | | Overall |
| Team | W | L | T | W | | L | | T |
|---|---|---|---|---|---|---|---|---|
| Tufts | | – | | 8 | – | 0 | – | 0 |
| Trinity (CT) | | – | | 7 | – | 0 | – | 0 |
| La Salle | | – | | 7 | – | 0 | – | 1 |
| Washington College | | – | | 5 | – | 0 | – | 1 |
| Franklin & Marshall | | – | | 8 | – | 1 | – | 0 |
| No. 4 Pittsburgh | | – | | 8 | – | 1 | – | 0 |
| No. 8 Colgate | | – | | 7 | – | 1 | – | 0 |
| Columbia | | – | | 7 | – | 1 | – | 0 |
| No. 5 Princeton | | – | | 7 | – | 1 | – | 0 |
| Duquesne | | – | | 8 | – | 2 | – | 0 |
| Holy Cross | | – | | 8 | – | 2 | – | 0 |
| No. 15 Temple | | – | | 7 | – | 1 | – | 2 |
| No. 10 Syracuse | | – | | 6 | – | 2 | – | 0 |
| Bucknell | | – | | 7 | – | 2 | – | 2 |
| No. 14 Army | | – | | 7 | – | 3 | – | 0 |
| Northeastern | | – | | 6 | – | 1 | – | 1 |
| Rochester | | – | | 5 | – | 2 | – | 0 |
| Dartmouth | | – | | 6 | – | 3 | – | 0 |
| Saint Anselm | | – | | 6 | – | 3 | – | 0 |
| Amherst | | – | | 5 | – | 3 | – | 0 |
| Fordham | | – | | 5 | – | 3 | – | 0 |
| Yale | | – | | 5 | – | 3 | – | 0 |
| Massachusetts State | | – | | 5 | – | 3 | – | 1 |
| CCNY | | – | | 4 | – | 3 | – | 0 |
| Providence | | – | | 4 | – | 3 | – | 0 |
| Drexel | | – | | 4 | – | 3 | – | 1 |
| Boston College | | – | | 5 | – | 4 | – | 0 |
| Bates | | – | | 3 | – | 3 | – | 1 |
| Middlebury | | – | | 3 | – | 3 | – | 1 |
| Penn | | – | | 4 | – | 4 | – | 0 |
| Penn State | | – | | 4 | – | 4 | – | 0 |
| Williams | | – | | 4 | – | 4 | – | 0 |
| Carnegie Tech | | – | | 4 | – | 5 | – | 0 |
| Washington & Jefferson | | – | | 4 | – | 5 | – | 0 |
| Villanova | | – | | 3 | – | 4 | – | 2 |
| NYU | | – | | 3 | – | 4 | – | 1 |
| Boston University | | – | | 3 | – | 4 | – | 0 |
| Colby | | – | | 3 | – | 4 | – | 0 |
| Springfield | | – | | 2 | – | 3 | – | 3 |
| Manhattan | | – | | 3 | – | 5 | – | 1 |
| Harvard | | – | | 3 | – | 5 | – | 0 |
| Vermont | | – | | 2 | – | 4 | – | 2 |
| Wesleyan | | – | | 3 | – | 5 | – | 0 |
| Brown | | – | | 3 | – | 6 | – | 0 |
| Geneva | | – | | 2 | – | 5 | – | 2 |
| Saint Joseph's | | – | | 2 | – | 5 | – | 1 |
| Cornell | | – | | 2 | – | 5 | – | 0 |
| Lafayette | | – | | 2 | – | 6 | – | 0 |
| Norwich | | – | | 2 | – | 6 | – | 0 |
| Bowdoin | | – | | 0 | – | 6 | – | 1 |
| Lowell Textile | | – | | 0 | – | 7 | – | 1 |
Rankings from Associated Press

The 1934 Fordham Rams football team was an American football team that represented Fordham University as an independent during the 1934 college football season. In its second year under head coach Jim Crowley, Fordham compiled a 5–3 record and outscored all opponents by a total of 165 to 92.

== Schedule ==
| Date | Opponent | Site | Result | Attendance | Source |
|---|---|---|---|---|---|
| October 6 | Westminster (PA) | Yankee Stadium; Bronx, NY | W 57–0 | 5,000 | |
| October 12 | at Boston College | Alumni Field; Chestnut Hill, MA | W 6–0 | 22,000 | |
| October 20 | Saint Mary's | Polo Grounds; New York, NY | L 9–14 | 60,000 | |
| October 27 | SMU | Polo Grounds; New York, NY | L 14–26 | 25,000 | |
| November 3 | Tennessee | Polo Grounds; New York, NY | W 13–12 | 25,000 | |
| November 10 | West Virginia | Polo Grounds; New York, NY | W 27–20 | | |
| November 17 | Purdue | Polo Grounds; New York, NY | L 0–7 | 25,000 | |
| November 29 | NYU | Yankee Stadium; Bronx, NY | W 39–13 | 25,000 | |
