= 1934 Carnegie Tech Tartans football team =

American college football season

1934 Carnegie Tech Tartans football
- Conference: Independent
- Record: 4–5
- Head coach: Howard Harpster (2nd season)
- Home stadium: Pitt Stadium

1934 Eastern college football independents records
| | Conf. | | | Overall |
| Team | W | L | T | W | | L | | T |
|---|---|---|---|---|---|---|---|---|
| Tufts | | – | | 8 | – | 0 | – | 0 |
| Trinity (CT) | | – | | 7 | – | 0 | – | 0 |
| La Salle | | – | | 7 | – | 0 | – | 1 |
| Washington College | | – | | 5 | – | 0 | – | 1 |
| Franklin & Marshall | | – | | 8 | – | 1 | – | 0 |
| No. 4 Pittsburgh | | – | | 8 | – | 1 | – | 0 |
| No. 8 Colgate | | – | | 7 | – | 1 | – | 0 |
| Columbia | | – | | 7 | – | 1 | – | 0 |
| No. 5 Princeton | | – | | 7 | – | 1 | – | 0 |
| Duquesne | | – | | 8 | – | 2 | – | 0 |
| Holy Cross | | – | | 8 | – | 2 | – | 0 |
| No. 15 Temple | | – | | 7 | – | 1 | – | 2 |
| No. 10 Syracuse | | – | | 6 | – | 2 | – | 0 |
| Bucknell | | – | | 7 | – | 2 | – | 2 |
| No. 14 Army | | – | | 7 | – | 3 | – | 0 |
| Northeastern | | – | | 6 | – | 1 | – | 1 |
| Rochester | | – | | 5 | – | 2 | – | 0 |
| Dartmouth | | – | | 6 | – | 3 | – | 0 |
| Saint Anselm | | – | | 6 | – | 3 | – | 0 |
| Amherst | | – | | 5 | – | 3 | – | 0 |
| Fordham | | – | | 5 | – | 3 | – | 0 |
| Yale | | – | | 5 | – | 3 | – | 0 |
| Massachusetts State | | – | | 5 | – | 3 | – | 1 |
| CCNY | | – | | 4 | – | 3 | – | 0 |
| Providence | | – | | 4 | – | 3 | – | 0 |
| Drexel | | – | | 4 | – | 3 | – | 1 |
| Boston College | | – | | 5 | – | 4 | – | 0 |
| Bates | | – | | 3 | – | 3 | – | 1 |
| Middlebury | | – | | 3 | – | 3 | – | 1 |
| Penn | | – | | 4 | – | 4 | – | 0 |
| Penn State | | – | | 4 | – | 4 | – | 0 |
| Williams | | – | | 4 | – | 4 | – | 0 |
| Carnegie Tech | | – | | 4 | – | 5 | – | 0 |
| Washington & Jefferson | | – | | 4 | – | 5 | – | 0 |
| Villanova | | – | | 3 | – | 4 | – | 2 |
| NYU | | – | | 3 | – | 4 | – | 1 |
| Boston University | | – | | 3 | – | 4 | – | 0 |
| Colby | | – | | 3 | – | 4 | – | 0 |
| Springfield | | – | | 2 | – | 3 | – | 3 |
| Manhattan | | – | | 3 | – | 5 | – | 1 |
| Harvard | | – | | 3 | – | 5 | – | 0 |
| Vermont | | – | | 2 | – | 4 | – | 2 |
| Wesleyan | | – | | 3 | – | 5 | – | 0 |
| Brown | | – | | 3 | – | 6 | – | 0 |
| Geneva | | – | | 2 | – | 5 | – | 2 |
| Saint Joseph's | | – | | 2 | – | 5 | – | 1 |
| Cornell | | – | | 2 | – | 5 | – | 0 |
| Lafayette | | – | | 2 | – | 6 | – | 0 |
| Norwich | | – | | 2 | – | 6 | – | 0 |
| Bowdoin | | – | | 0 | – | 6 | – | 1 |
| Lowell Textile | | – | | 0 | – | 7 | – | 1 |
Rankings from Associated Press

The 1934 Carnegie Tech Tartans football team represented the Carnegie Institute of Technology—now known as Carnegie Mellon University—as an independent during the 1934 college football season. Led by second-year head coach Howard Harpster, the Tartans compiled a record of 4–5.

== Schedule ==
| Date | Opponent | Site | Result | Attendance | Source |
|---|---|---|---|---|---|
| September 29 | Geneva | Pittsburgh, PA | W 7–0 | | |
| October 6 | Miami (OH) | Pittsburgh, PA | W 13–7 | | |
| October 13 | at Michigan State | College Field; East Lansing, MI | L 0–13 | 13,000 | |
| October 20 | at Notre Dame | Notre Dame Stadium; Notre Dame, IN | L 0–13 | 11,242 | |
| October 27 | Purdue | Pitt Stadium; Pittsburgh, PA | L 0–20 | 6,000 | |
| November 3 | at NYU | Yankee Stadium; Bronx, NY | W 6–0 | | |
| November 10 | at Temple | Temple Stadium; Philadelphia, PA | L 6–34 | 20,000 | |
| November 17 | Duquesne | Pittsburgh, PA | W 3–0 | | |
| November 29 | at Pittsburgh | Pitt Stadium; Pittsburgh, PA | L 0–20 | 35,562 | |
