= 1934 Yale Bulldogs football team =

American college football season

1934 Yale Bulldogs football
- Conference: Independent
- Record: 5–3
- Head coach: Ducky Pond (1st season)
- Captain: Francis C. Curtin
- Home stadium: Yale Bowl

1934 Eastern college football independents records
	Conf.			Overall
Team	W	L	T	W		L		T
Tufts		–		8	–	0	–	0
Trinity (CT)		–		7	–	0	–	0
La Salle		–		7	–	0	–	1
Washington College		–		5	–	0	–	1
Franklin & Marshall		–		8	–	1	–	0
No. 4 Pittsburgh		–		8	–	1	–	0
No. 8 Colgate		–		7	–	1	–	0
Columbia		–		7	–	1	–	0
No. 5 Princeton		–		7	–	1	–	0
Duquesne		–		8	–	2	–	0
Holy Cross		–		8	–	2	–	0
No. 15 Temple		–		7	–	1	–	2
No. 10 Syracuse		–		6	–	2	–	0
Bucknell		–		7	–	2	–	2
No. 14 Army		–		7	–	3	–	0
Northeastern		–		6	–	1	–	1
Rochester		–		5	–	2	–	0
Dartmouth		–		6	–	3	–	0
Saint Anselm		–		6	–	3	–	0
Amherst		–		5	–	3	–	0
Fordham		–		5	–	3	–	0
Yale		–		5	–	3	–	0
Massachusetts State		–		5	–	3	–	1
CCNY		–		4	–	3	–	0
Providence		–		4	–	3	–	0
Drexel		–		4	–	3	–	1
Boston College		–		5	–	4	–	0
Bates		–		3	–	3	–	1
Middlebury		–		3	–	3	–	1
Penn		–		4	–	4	–	0
Penn State		–		4	–	4	–	0
Williams		–		4	–	4	–	0
Carnegie Tech		–		4	–	5	–	0
Washington & Jefferson		–		4	–	5	–	0
Villanova		–		3	–	4	–	2
NYU		–		3	–	4	–	1
Boston University		–		3	–	4	–	0
Colby		–		3	–	4	–	0
Springfield		–		2	–	3	–	3
Manhattan		–		3	–	5	–	1
Harvard		–		3	–	5	–	0
Vermont		–		2	–	4	–	2
Wesleyan		–		3	–	5	–	0
Brown		–		3	–	6	–	0
Geneva		–		2	–	5	–	2
Saint Joseph's		–		2	–	5	–	1
Cornell		–		2	–	5	–	0
Lafayette		–		2	–	6	–	0
Norwich		–		2	–	6	–	0
Bowdoin		–		0	–	6	–	1
Lowell Textile		–		0	–	7	–	1
Rankings from Associated Press

The 1934 Yale Bulldogs football team represented Yale University in the 1934 college football season. The Bulldogs were led by first-year head coach Ducky Pond, played their home games at the Yale Bowl and finished the season with a 5–3 record.

== Schedule ==
Date	Opponent	Site	Result	Attendance	Source
October 6	Columbia	Yale Bowl; New Haven, CT	L 6–12	25,000	
October 13	Penn	Yale Bowl; New Haven, CT	W 14–6		
October 20	Brown	Yale Bowl; New Haven, CT	W 37–0		
October 27	Army	Yale Bowl; New Haven, CT	L 12–20		
November 3	Dartmouth	Yale Bowl; New Haven, CT	W 7–2	40,000	
November 10	Georgia	Yale Bowl; New Haven, CT	L 7–14		
November 17	at Princeton	Palmer Stadium; Princeton, NJ (rivalry)	W 7–0	52,000	
November 24	Harvard	Yale Bowl; New Haven, CT (rivalry)	W 14–0		
