= 1934 Northeastern Huskies football team =

American college football season

1934 Northeastern Huskies football
- Conference: Independent
- Record: 6–1–1
- Head coach: Alfred McCoy (2nd season)
- Captain: Richard Mitchell
- Home stadium: Kent Street Field

1934 Eastern college football independents records
	Conf.			Overall
Team	W	L	T	W		L		T
Tufts		–		8	–	0	–	0
Trinity (CT)		–		7	–	0	–	0
La Salle		–		7	–	0	–	1
Washington College		–		5	–	0	–	1
Franklin & Marshall		–		8	–	1	–	0
No. 4 Pittsburgh		–		8	–	1	–	0
No. 8 Colgate		–		7	–	1	–	0
Columbia		–		7	–	1	–	0
No. 5 Princeton		–		7	–	1	–	0
Duquesne		–		8	–	2	–	0
Holy Cross		–		8	–	2	–	0
No. 15 Temple		–		7	–	1	–	2
No. 10 Syracuse		–		6	–	2	–	0
Bucknell		–		7	–	2	–	2
No. 14 Army		–		7	–	3	–	0
Northeastern		–		6	–	1	–	1
Rochester		–		5	–	2	–	0
Dartmouth		–		6	–	3	–	0
Saint Anselm		–		6	–	3	–	0
Amherst		–		5	–	3	–	0
Fordham		–		5	–	3	–	0
Yale		–		5	–	3	–	0
Massachusetts State		–		5	–	3	–	1
CCNY		–		4	–	3	–	0
Providence		–		4	–	3	–	0
Drexel		–		4	–	3	–	1
Boston College		–		5	–	4	–	0
Bates		–		3	–	3	–	1
Middlebury		–		3	–	3	–	1
Penn		–		4	–	4	–	0
Penn State		–		4	–	4	–	0
Williams		–		4	–	4	–	0
Carnegie Tech		–		4	–	5	–	0
Washington & Jefferson		–		4	–	5	–	0
Villanova		–		3	–	4	–	2
NYU		–		3	–	4	–	1
Boston University		–		3	–	4	–	0
Colby		–		3	–	4	–	0
Springfield		–		2	–	3	–	3
Manhattan		–		3	–	5	–	1
Harvard		–		3	–	5	–	0
Vermont		–		2	–	4	–	2
Wesleyan		–		3	–	5	–	0
Brown		–		3	–	6	–	0
Geneva		–		2	–	5	–	2
Saint Joseph's		–		2	–	5	–	1
Cornell		–		2	–	5	–	0
Lafayette		–		2	–	6	–	0
Norwich		–		2	–	6	–	0
Bowdoin		–		0	–	6	–	1
Lowell Textile		–		0	–	7	–	1
Rankings from Associated Press

The 1934 Northeastern Huskies football team represented Northeastern University of Boston, Massachusetts, during the 1934 college football season. It was the program's second season and they finished with a record of 6–1–1. Their head coach was Alfred McCoy and their captain was Richard Mitchell.

== Schedule ==
Date	Opponent	Site	Result	Source
September 29	American International	Kent Street Field; Brookline, MA	W 27–6	
October 6	at Alfred	Alfred, NY	T 13–13	
October 13	at Rhode Island	Meade Stadium; Kingston, RI	W 6–0	
October 20	at Colby	Waterville, ME	W 13–6	
October 27	Lowell Textile	Kent Street Field; Brookline, MA	W 26–0	
November 3	Arnold	Kent Street Field; Brookline, MA	W 31–6	
November 10	at Massachusetts State	Alumni Field; Amherst, MA	L 0–37	
November 17	Norwich	Kent Street Field; Brookline, MA	W 24–7	
