= 1934 Dartmouth Indians football team =

American college football season

1934 Dartmouth Indians football
- Conference: Independent
- Record: 6–3
- Head coach: Earl Blaik (1st season)
- Captain: George Hill
- Home stadium: Memorial Field

1934 Eastern college football independents records
	Conf.			Overall
Team	W	L	T	W		L		T
Tufts		–		8	–	0	–	0
Trinity (CT)		–		7	–	0	–	0
La Salle		–		7	–	0	–	1
Washington College		–		5	–	0	–	1
Franklin & Marshall		–		8	–	1	–	0
No. 4 Pittsburgh		–		8	–	1	–	0
No. 8 Colgate		–		7	–	1	–	0
Columbia		–		7	–	1	–	0
No. 5 Princeton		–		7	–	1	–	0
Duquesne		–		8	–	2	–	0
Holy Cross		–		8	–	2	–	0
No. 15 Temple		–		7	–	1	–	2
No. 10 Syracuse		–		6	–	2	–	0
Bucknell		–		7	–	2	–	2
No. 14 Army		–		7	–	3	–	0
Northeastern		–		6	–	1	–	1
Rochester		–		5	–	2	–	0
Dartmouth		–		6	–	3	–	0
Saint Anselm		–		6	–	3	–	0
Amherst		–		5	–	3	–	0
Fordham		–		5	–	3	–	0
Yale		–		5	–	3	–	0
Massachusetts State		–		5	–	3	–	1
CCNY		–		4	–	3	–	0
Providence		–		4	–	3	–	0
Drexel		–		4	–	3	–	1
Boston College		–		5	–	4	–	0
Bates		–		3	–	3	–	1
Middlebury		–		3	–	3	–	1
Penn		–		4	–	4	–	0
Penn State		–		4	–	4	–	0
Williams		–		4	–	4	–	0
Carnegie Tech		–		4	–	5	–	0
Washington & Jefferson		–		4	–	5	–	0
Villanova		–		3	–	4	–	2
NYU		–		3	–	4	–	1
Boston University		–		3	–	4	–	0
Colby		–		3	–	4	–	0
Springfield		–		2	–	3	–	3
Manhattan		–		3	–	5	–	1
Harvard		–		3	–	5	–	0
Vermont		–		2	–	4	–	2
Wesleyan		–		3	–	5	–	0
Brown		–		3	–	6	–	0
Geneva		–		2	–	5	–	2
Saint Joseph's		–		2	–	5	–	1
Cornell		–		2	–	5	–	0
Lafayette		–		2	–	6	–	0
Norwich		–		2	–	6	–	0
Bowdoin		–		0	–	6	–	1
Lowell Textile		–		0	–	7	–	1
Rankings from Associated Press

The 1934 Dartmouth Indians football team was an American football team that represented Dartmouth College as an independent during the 1934 college football season. In their first season under head coach Earl Blaik, the Indians compiled a 6–3 record. George Hill was the team captain.

Phil Conti was the team's leading scorer, with 30 points, from five touchdowns.

Dartmouth played its home games at Memorial Field on the college campus in Hanover, New Hampshire.

== Schedule ==
Date	Opponent	Site	Result	Attendance	Source
September 29	Norwich	Memorial Field; Hanover, NH	W 39–0		
October 6	Vermont	Memorial Field; Hanover, NH	W 32–0		
October 13	Maine	Memorial Field; Hanover, NH	W 27–0		
October 20	Virginia	Memorial Field; Hanover, NH	W 27–0		
October 27	at Harvard	Harvard Stadium; Boston, MA (rivalry)	W 10–0	35,000	
November 3	at Yale	Yale Bowl; New Haven, CT	L 2–7	40,000	
November 10	New Hampshire	Memorial Field; Hanover, NH (rivalry)	W 21–7		
November 17	at Cornell	Schoellkopf Field; Ithaca, NY (rivalry)	L 6–21	12,000	
November 24	at Princeton	Palmer Stadium; Princeton, NJ	L 13–38	40,000	
