= 1934 Duquesne Dukes football team =

American college football season

1934 Duquesne Dukes football
- Conference: Independent
- Record: 8–2
- Head coach: Joe Bach (1st season)
- Home stadium: Forbes Field

1934 Eastern college football independents records
	Conf.			Overall
Team	W	L	T	W		L		T
Tufts		–		8	–	0	–	0
Trinity (CT)		–		7	–	0	–	0
La Salle		–		7	–	0	–	1
Washington College		–		5	–	0	–	1
Franklin & Marshall		–		8	–	1	–	0
No. 4 Pittsburgh		–		8	–	1	–	0
No. 8 Colgate		–		7	–	1	–	0
Columbia		–		7	–	1	–	0
No. 5 Princeton		–		7	–	1	–	0
Duquesne		–		8	–	2	–	0
Holy Cross		–		8	–	2	–	0
No. 15 Temple		–		7	–	1	–	2
No. 10 Syracuse		–		6	–	2	–	0
Bucknell		–		7	–	2	–	2
No. 14 Army		–		7	–	3	–	0
Northeastern		–		6	–	1	–	1
Rochester		–		5	–	2	–	0
Dartmouth		–		6	–	3	–	0
Saint Anselm		–		6	–	3	–	0
Amherst		–		5	–	3	–	0
Fordham		–		5	–	3	–	0
Yale		–		5	–	3	–	0
Massachusetts State		–		5	–	3	–	1
CCNY		–		4	–	3	–	0
Providence		–		4	–	3	–	0
Drexel		–		4	–	3	–	1
Boston College		–		5	–	4	–	0
Bates		–		3	–	3	–	1
Middlebury		–		3	–	3	–	1
Penn		–		4	–	4	–	0
Penn State		–		4	–	4	–	0
Williams		–		4	–	4	–	0
Carnegie Tech		–		4	–	5	–	0
Washington & Jefferson		–		4	–	5	–	0
Villanova		–		3	–	4	–	2
NYU		–		3	–	4	–	1
Boston University		–		3	–	4	–	0
Colby		–		3	–	4	–	0
Springfield		–		2	–	3	–	3
Manhattan		–		3	–	5	–	1
Harvard		–		3	–	5	–	0
Vermont		–		2	–	4	–	2
Wesleyan		–		3	–	5	–	0
Brown		–		3	–	6	–	0
Geneva		–		2	–	5	–	2
Saint Joseph's		–		2	–	5	–	1
Cornell		–		2	–	5	–	0
Lafayette		–		2	–	6	–	0
Norwich		–		2	–	6	–	0
Bowdoin		–		0	–	6	–	1
Lowell Textile		–		0	–	7	–	1
Rankings from Associated Press

The 1934 Duquesne Dukes football team was an American football team that represented Duquesne University as an independent during the 1934 college football season. In its first and only season under head coach Joe Bach, Duquesne compiled an 8–2 record and outscored opponents by a total of 322 to 22. The team played its home games at Forbes Field in Pittsburgh.

Fullback Art Strutt led the team, and ranked second in the East, with 18 touchdowns and 108 points scored.

== Schedule ==
Date	Time	Opponent	Site	Result	Attendance	Source
September 21		Waynesburg	Forbes Field; Pittsburgh, PA	W 39–0		
September 28		West Virginia	Forbes Field; Pittsburgh, PA	L 0–7	25,000	
October 5		Ashland	Forbes Field; Pittsburgh, PA	W 99–0		
October 12		Bucknell	Forbes Field; Pittsburgh, PA	W 12–0	10,000	
October 19	8:15 p.m.	Haskell	Forbes Field; Pittsburgh, PA	W 67–0	7,000	
October 26		at Detroit	University of Detroit Stadium; Detroit, MI	W 20–6	15,000	
November 2	8:15 p.m	West Virginia Wesleyan	Forbes Field; Pittsburgh, PA	W 39–6		
November 10		Oklahoma A&M	Forbes Field; Pittsburgh, PA	W 32–0		
November 17		at Carnegie Tech	Pittsburgh, PA	L 0–3		
November 24		Catholic University	Forbes Field; Pittsburgh, PA	W 14–0	7,500	
All times are in Eastern time
