= 1934 Vermont Catamounts football team =

American college football season

1934 Vermont Catamounts football
- Conference: Independent
- Record: 2–4–2
- Head coach: John P. Sabo (1st season)
- Home stadium: Centennial Field

1934 Eastern college football independents records
	Conf.			Overall
Team	W	L	T	W		L		T
Tufts		–		8	–	0	–	0
Trinity (CT)		–		7	–	0	–	0
La Salle		–		7	–	0	–	1
Washington College		–		5	–	0	–	1
Franklin & Marshall		–		8	–	1	–	0
No. 4 Pittsburgh		–		8	–	1	–	0
No. 8 Colgate		–		7	–	1	–	0
Columbia		–		7	–	1	–	0
No. 5 Princeton		–		7	–	1	–	0
Duquesne		–		8	–	2	–	0
Holy Cross		–		8	–	2	–	0
No. 15 Temple		–		7	–	1	–	2
No. 10 Syracuse		–		6	–	2	–	0
Bucknell		–		7	–	2	–	2
No. 14 Army		–		7	–	3	–	0
Northeastern		–		6	–	1	–	1
Rochester		–		5	–	2	–	0
Dartmouth		–		6	–	3	–	0
Saint Anselm		–		6	–	3	–	0
Amherst		–		5	–	3	–	0
Fordham		–		5	–	3	–	0
Yale		–		5	–	3	–	0
Massachusetts State		–		5	–	3	–	1
CCNY		–		4	–	3	–	0
Providence		–		4	–	3	–	0
Drexel		–		4	–	3	–	1
Boston College		–		5	–	4	–	0
Bates		–		3	–	3	–	1
Middlebury		–		3	–	3	–	1
Penn		–		4	–	4	–	0
Penn State		–		4	–	4	–	0
Williams		–		4	–	4	–	0
Carnegie Tech		–		4	–	5	–	0
Washington & Jefferson		–		4	–	5	–	0
Villanova		–		3	–	4	–	2
NYU		–		3	–	4	–	1
Boston University		–		3	–	4	–	0
Colby		–		3	–	4	–	0
Springfield		–		2	–	3	–	3
Manhattan		–		3	–	5	–	1
Harvard		–		3	–	5	–	0
Vermont		–		2	–	4	–	2
Wesleyan		–		3	–	5	–	0
Brown		–		3	–	6	–	0
Geneva		–		2	–	5	–	2
Saint Joseph's		–		2	–	5	–	1
Cornell		–		2	–	5	–	0
Lafayette		–		2	–	6	–	0
Norwich		–		2	–	6	–	0
Bowdoin		–		0	–	6	–	1
Lowell Textile		–		0	–	7	–	1
Rankings from Associated Press

The 1934 Vermont Catamounts football team was an American football team that represented the University of Vermont as an independent during the 1934 college football season. In their first year under head coach John P. Sabo, the team compiled a 2–4–2 record.

== Schedule ==
Date	Opponent	Site	Result	Attendance	Source
September 29	at RPI	'86 Field; Troy, NY	W 19–0		
October 6	at Dartmouth	Memorial Field; Hanover, NH	L 0–32		
October 13	Ithaca	Centennial Field; Burlington, VT	L 0–7	3,000	
October 20	at Union (NY)	Alexander Field; Schenectady, NY	T 0–0		
October 27	Boston University	Centennial Field; Burlington, VT	L 0–19		
November 3	Norwich	Centennial Field; Burlington, VT	W 7–0		
November 10	Trinity (CT)	Centennial Field; Burlington, VT	L 7–21	4,000	
November 17	at Middlebury	Porter Field; Middlebury, VT	T 0–0		
