= 1934 Holy Cross Crusaders football team =

American college football season

1934 Holy Cross Crusaders football
- Conference: Independent
- Record: 8–2
- Head coach: Eddie Anderson (2nd season)
- Home stadium: Fitton Field

1934 Eastern college football independents records
	Conf.			Overall
Team	W	L	T	W		L		T
Tufts		–		8	–	0	–	0
Trinity (CT)		–		7	–	0	–	0
La Salle		–		7	–	0	–	1
Washington College		–		5	–	0	–	1
Franklin & Marshall		–		8	–	1	–	0
No. 4 Pittsburgh		–		8	–	1	–	0
No. 8 Colgate		–		7	–	1	–	0
Columbia		–		7	–	1	–	0
No. 5 Princeton		–		7	–	1	–	0
Duquesne		–		8	–	2	–	0
Holy Cross		–		8	–	2	–	0
No. 15 Temple		–		7	–	1	–	2
No. 10 Syracuse		–		6	–	2	–	0
Bucknell		–		7	–	2	–	2
No. 14 Army		–		7	–	3	–	0
Northeastern		–		6	–	1	–	1
Rochester		–		5	–	2	–	0
Dartmouth		–		6	–	3	–	0
Saint Anselm		–		6	–	3	–	0
Amherst		–		5	–	3	–	0
Fordham		–		5	–	3	–	0
Yale		–		5	–	3	–	0
Massachusetts State		–		5	–	3	–	1
CCNY		–		4	–	3	–	0
Providence		–		4	–	3	–	0
Drexel		–		4	–	3	–	1
Boston College		–		5	–	4	–	0
Bates		–		3	–	3	–	1
Middlebury		–		3	–	3	–	1
Penn		–		4	–	4	–	0
Penn State		–		4	–	4	–	0
Williams		–		4	–	4	–	0
Carnegie Tech		–		4	–	5	–	0
Washington & Jefferson		–		4	–	5	–	0
Villanova		–		3	–	4	–	2
NYU		–		3	–	4	–	1
Boston University		–		3	–	4	–	0
Colby		–		3	–	4	–	0
Springfield		–		2	–	3	–	3
Manhattan		–		3	–	5	–	1
Harvard		–		3	–	5	–	0
Vermont		–		2	–	4	–	2
Wesleyan		–		3	–	5	–	0
Brown		–		3	–	6	–	0
Geneva		–		2	–	5	–	2
Saint Joseph's		–		2	–	5	–	1
Cornell		–		2	–	5	–	0
Lafayette		–		2	–	6	–	0
Norwich		–		2	–	6	–	0
Bowdoin		–		0	–	6	–	1
Lowell Textile		–		0	–	7	–	1
Rankings from Associated Press

The 1934 Holy Cross Crusaders football team was an American football team that represented the College of the Holy Cross as an independent during the 1934 college football season. In its second year under head coach Eddie Anderson, the team compiled an 8–2 record. The team played its home games at Fitton Field in Worcester, Massachusetts.

== Schedule ==
Date	Opponent	Site	Result	Attendance	Source
September 22	Saint Anselm	Fitton Field; Worcester, MA	W 22–0		
September 29	St. Joseph's	Fitton Field; Worcester, MA	W 51–0		
October 6	Providence	Fitton Field; Worcester, MA	W 25–0		
October 13	Catholic University	Fitton Field; Worcester, MA	W 17–6	7,500	
October 20	at Harvard	Harvard Stadium; Boston, MA	W 26–6		
October 27	Colgate	Fitton Field; Worcester, MA	L 7–20		
November 3	at Temple	Temple Stadium; Philadelphia, PA	L 0–14	30,000	
November 10	at Manhattan	Ebbets Field; Brooklyn, NY	W 12–6	15,000	
November 17	at Brown	Brown Field; Providence, RI	W 20–7		
December 1	at Boston College	Alumni Field; Chestnut Hill, MA (rivalry)	W 7–2	18,000	
