= 1934 Washington & Jefferson Presidents football team =

American college football season

1934 Washington & Jefferson Presidents football
- Conference: Independent
- Record: 4–5
- Head coach: Hank Day (3rd season)

1934 Eastern college football independents records
	Conf.			Overall
Team	W	L	T	W		L		T
Tufts		–		8	–	0	–	0
Trinity (CT)		–		7	–	0	–	0
La Salle		–		7	–	0	–	1
Washington College		–		5	–	0	–	1
Franklin & Marshall		–		8	–	1	–	0
No. 4 Pittsburgh		–		8	–	1	–	0
No. 8 Colgate		–		7	–	1	–	0
Columbia		–		7	–	1	–	0
No. 5 Princeton		–		7	–	1	–	0
Duquesne		–		8	–	2	–	0
Holy Cross		–		8	–	2	–	0
No. 15 Temple		–		7	–	1	–	2
No. 10 Syracuse		–		6	–	2	–	0
Bucknell		–		7	–	2	–	2
No. 14 Army		–		7	–	3	–	0
Northeastern		–		6	–	1	–	1
Rochester		–		5	–	2	–	0
Dartmouth		–		6	–	3	–	0
Saint Anselm		–		6	–	3	–	0
Amherst		–		5	–	3	–	0
Fordham		–		5	–	3	–	0
Yale		–		5	–	3	–	0
Massachusetts State		–		5	–	3	–	1
CCNY		–		4	–	3	–	0
Providence		–		4	–	3	–	0
Drexel		–		4	–	3	–	1
Boston College		–		5	–	4	–	0
Bates		–		3	–	3	–	1
Middlebury		–		3	–	3	–	1
Penn		–		4	–	4	–	0
Penn State		–		4	–	4	–	0
Williams		–		4	–	4	–	0
Carnegie Tech		–		4	–	5	–	0
Washington & Jefferson		–		4	–	5	–	0
Villanova		–		3	–	4	–	2
NYU		–		3	–	4	–	1
Boston University		–		3	–	4	–	0
Colby		–		3	–	4	–	0
Springfield		–		2	–	3	–	3
Manhattan		–		3	–	5	–	1
Harvard		–		3	–	5	–	0
Vermont		–		2	–	4	–	2
Wesleyan		–		3	–	5	–	0
Brown		–		3	–	6	–	0
Geneva		–		2	–	5	–	2
Saint Joseph's		–		2	–	5	–	1
Cornell		–		2	–	5	–	0
Lafayette		–		2	–	6	–	0
Norwich		–		2	–	6	–	0
Bowdoin		–		0	–	6	–	1
Lowell Textile		–		0	–	7	–	1
Rankings from Associated Press

The 1934 Washington & Jefferson Presidents football team was an American football team that represented Washington & Jefferson College as an independent during the 1934 college football season. The team compiled a 4–5 record and was outscored by a total of 108 to 87. Hank Day was the head coach.

== Schedule ==
Date	Opponent	Site	Result	Attendance	Source
September 29	at Pittsburgh	Pitt Stadium; Pittsburgh, PA	L 6–26	15,000	
October 6	Wooster	Washington, PA	W 20–0		
October 12	at Detroit	University of Detroit Stadium; Detroit, MI	L 0–12	13,000	
October 20	at Geneva	Beaver Falls, PA	W 6–0		
October 27	Waynesburg	Washington, PA	W 9–0		
November 2	at Mercer	Centennial Stadium; Macon, GA	L 7–30		
November 10	Bucknell	Washington, PA	L 7–13	> 5,000	
November 17	at Xavier	Corcoran Field; Cincinnati, OH	W 20–13	6,000	
November 29	vs. West Virginia	Atlantic City Convention Hall; Atlantic City, NJ	L 12–14	4,000	
