= 1934 Bucknell Bison football team =

American college football season

1934 Bucknell Bison football

Orange Bowl champion

Orange Bowl, W 26–0 vs. Miami (FL)
- Conference: Independent
- Record: 7–2–2
- Head coach: Edward Mylin (1st season)
- Home stadium: Memorial Stadium

1934 Eastern college football independents records
	Conf.			Overall
Team	W	L	T	W		L		T
Tufts		–		8	–	0	–	0
Trinity (CT)		–		7	–	0	–	0
La Salle		–		7	–	0	–	1
Washington College		–		5	–	0	–	1
Franklin & Marshall		–		8	–	1	–	0
No. 4 Pittsburgh		–		8	–	1	–	0
No. 8 Colgate		–		7	–	1	–	0
Columbia		–		7	–	1	–	0
No. 5 Princeton		–		7	–	1	–	0
Duquesne		–		8	–	2	–	0
Holy Cross		–		8	–	2	–	0
No. 15 Temple		–		7	–	1	–	2
No. 10 Syracuse		–		6	–	2	–	0
Bucknell		–		7	–	2	–	2
No. 14 Army		–		7	–	3	–	0
Northeastern		–		6	–	1	–	1
Rochester		–		5	–	2	–	0
Dartmouth		–		6	–	3	–	0
Saint Anselm		–		6	–	3	–	0
Amherst		–		5	–	3	–	0
Fordham		–		5	–	3	–	0
Yale		–		5	–	3	–	0
Massachusetts State		–		5	–	3	–	1
CCNY		–		4	–	3	–	0
Providence		–		4	–	3	–	0
Drexel		–		4	–	3	–	1
Boston College		–		5	–	4	–	0
Bates		–		3	–	3	–	1
Middlebury		–		3	–	3	–	1
Penn		–		4	–	4	–	0
Penn State		–		4	–	4	–	0
Williams		–		4	–	4	–	0
Carnegie Tech		–		4	–	5	–	0
Washington & Jefferson		–		4	–	5	–	0
Villanova		–		3	–	4	–	2
NYU		–		3	–	4	–	1
Boston University		–		3	–	4	–	0
Colby		–		3	–	4	–	0
Springfield		–		2	–	3	–	3
Manhattan		–		3	–	5	–	1
Harvard		–		3	–	5	–	0
Vermont		–		2	–	4	–	2
Wesleyan		–		3	–	5	–	0
Brown		–		3	–	6	–	0
Geneva		–		2	–	5	–	2
Saint Joseph's		–		2	–	5	–	1
Cornell		–		2	–	5	–	0
Lafayette		–		2	–	6	–	0
Norwich		–		2	–	6	–	0
Bowdoin		–		0	–	6	–	1
Lowell Textile		–		0	–	7	–	1
Rankings from Associated Press

The 1934 Bucknell Bison football team was an American football team that represented Bucknell University as an independent during the 1934 college football season. In its first season under head coach Edward Mylin, the team compiled a 7–2–2 record, including a victory in the first Orange Bowl game. The team's only losses were to one-loss Duquesne and undefeated Western Maryland.

The team played its home games at Memorial Stadium in Lewisburg, Pennsylvania.

== Schedule ==
Date	Opponent	Site	Result	Attendance	Source
September 28	Davis & Elkins	Memorial Stadium; Lewisburg, PA	W 12–0		
October 5	Pennsylvania Military	Memorial Stadium; Lewisburg, PA	T 0–0		
October 12	at Duquesne	Forbes Field; Pittsburgh, PA	L 0–12	10,000	
October 20	at St. Thomas (PA)	Brooks Field; Scranton, PA	W 12–6		
October 27	Villanova^{†}	Memorial Stadium; Lewisburg, PA	W 13–0	6,000	
November 3	at Furman	Manly Field; Greenville, SC	W 19–0	4,000	
November 10	at Washington & Jefferson	Washington, PA	W 13–7	> 5,000	
November 17	Western Maryland	Memorial Stadium; Lewisburg, PA	L 0–6		
November 24	Penn State	Memorial Stadium; Lewisburg, PA	W 13–7	10,000	
November 29	at Temple	Temple Stadium; Philadelphia, PA	T 0–0	30,000	
January 1, 1935	vs. Miami (FL)	Miami Field Stadium; Miami, FL (Orange Bowl)	W 26–0	5,134	
^{†}Homecoming
