= 1934 Villanova Wildcats football team =

American college football season

1934 Villanova Wildcats football
- Conference: Independent
- Record: 3–4–2
- Head coach: Harry Stuhldreher (10th season)
- Captain: William Grimberg
- Home stadium: Villanova Stadium

1934 Eastern college football independents records
	Conf.			Overall
Team	W	L	T	W		L		T
Tufts		–		8	–	0	–	0
Trinity (CT)		–		7	–	0	–	0
La Salle		–		7	–	0	–	1
Washington College		–		5	–	0	–	1
Franklin & Marshall		–		8	–	1	–	0
No. 4 Pittsburgh		–		8	–	1	–	0
No. 8 Colgate		–		7	–	1	–	0
Columbia		–		7	–	1	–	0
No. 5 Princeton		–		7	–	1	–	0
Duquesne		–		8	–	2	–	0
Holy Cross		–		8	–	2	–	0
No. 15 Temple		–		7	–	1	–	2
No. 10 Syracuse		–		6	–	2	–	0
Bucknell		–		7	–	2	–	2
No. 14 Army		–		7	–	3	–	0
Northeastern		–		6	–	1	–	1
Rochester		–		5	–	2	–	0
Dartmouth		–		6	–	3	–	0
Saint Anselm		–		6	–	3	–	0
Amherst		–		5	–	3	–	0
Fordham		–		5	–	3	–	0
Yale		–		5	–	3	–	0
Massachusetts State		–		5	–	3	–	1
CCNY		–		4	–	3	–	0
Providence		–		4	–	3	–	0
Drexel		–		4	–	3	–	1
Boston College		–		5	–	4	–	0
Bates		–		3	–	3	–	1
Middlebury		–		3	–	3	–	1
Penn		–		4	–	4	–	0
Penn State		–		4	–	4	–	0
Williams		–		4	–	4	–	0
Carnegie Tech		–		4	–	5	–	0
Washington & Jefferson		–		4	–	5	–	0
Villanova		–		3	–	4	–	2
NYU		–		3	–	4	–	1
Boston University		–		3	–	4	–	0
Colby		–		3	–	4	–	0
Springfield		–		2	–	3	–	3
Manhattan		–		3	–	5	–	1
Harvard		–		3	–	5	–	0
Vermont		–		2	–	4	–	2
Wesleyan		–		3	–	5	–	0
Brown		–		3	–	6	–	0
Geneva		–		2	–	5	–	2
Saint Joseph's		–		2	–	5	–	1
Cornell		–		2	–	5	–	0
Lafayette		–		2	–	6	–	0
Norwich		–		2	–	6	–	0
Bowdoin		–		0	–	6	–	1
Lowell Textile		–		0	–	7	–	1
Rankings from Associated Press

The 1934 Villanova Wildcats football team represented the Villanova University during the 1934 college football season. The head coach was Harry Stuhldreher, coaching his tenth season with the Wildcats. The team played their home games at Villanova Stadium in Villanova, Pennsylvania.

== Schedule ==
Date	Opponent	Site	Result	Attendance	Source
September 29	Ursinus	Villanova Stadium; Villanova, PA	W 35–0		
October 6	Western Maryland	Villanova Stadium; Villanova, PA	T 0–0		
October 13	La Salle	Villanova Stadium; Villanova, PA	L 6–13	8,000	
October 20	Detroit	Villanova Stadium; Villanova, PA	T 0–0	8,000	
October 27	at Bucknell	Memorial Stadium; Lewisburg, PA	L 0–13	6,000	
November 3	at Boston College	Alumni Field; Chestnut Hill, MA	L 0–6		
November 10	South Carolina	Villanova Stadium; Villanova, PA	W 20–9		
November 17	at Manhattan	Ebbets Field; Brooklyn, NY	W 39–0	15,000	
November 24	at Temple	Temple Stadium; Philadelphia, PA	L 0–22		
