= 1934 Harvard Crimson football team =

American college football season

1934 Harvard Crimson football
- Conference: Independent
- Record: 3–5
- Head coach: Eddie Casey (4th season)
- Home stadium: Harvard Stadium

1934 Eastern college football independents records
	Conf.			Overall
Team	W	L	T	W		L		T
Tufts		–		8	–	0	–	0
Trinity (CT)		–		7	–	0	–	0
La Salle		–		7	–	0	–	1
Washington College		–		5	–	0	–	1
Franklin & Marshall		–		8	–	1	–	0
No. 4 Pittsburgh		–		8	–	1	–	0
No. 8 Colgate		–		7	–	1	–	0
Columbia		–		7	–	1	–	0
No. 5 Princeton		–		7	–	1	–	0
Duquesne		–		8	–	2	–	0
Holy Cross		–		8	–	2	–	0
No. 15 Temple		–		7	–	1	–	2
No. 10 Syracuse		–		6	–	2	–	0
Bucknell		–		7	–	2	–	2
No. 14 Army		–		7	–	3	–	0
Northeastern		–		6	–	1	–	1
Rochester		–		5	–	2	–	0
Dartmouth		–		6	–	3	–	0
Saint Anselm		–		6	–	3	–	0
Amherst		–		5	–	3	–	0
Fordham		–		5	–	3	–	0
Yale		–		5	–	3	–	0
Massachusetts State		–		5	–	3	–	1
CCNY		–		4	–	3	–	0
Providence		–		4	–	3	–	0
Drexel		–		4	–	3	–	1
Boston College		–		5	–	4	–	0
Bates		–		3	–	3	–	1
Middlebury		–		3	–	3	–	1
Penn		–		4	–	4	–	0
Penn State		–		4	–	4	–	0
Williams		–		4	–	4	–	0
Carnegie Tech		–		4	–	5	–	0
Washington & Jefferson		–		4	–	5	–	0
Villanova		–		3	–	4	–	2
NYU		–		3	–	4	–	1
Boston University		–		3	–	4	–	0
Colby		–		3	–	4	–	0
Springfield		–		2	–	3	–	3
Manhattan		–		3	–	5	–	1
Harvard		–		3	–	5	–	0
Vermont		–		2	–	4	–	2
Wesleyan		–		3	–	5	–	0
Brown		–		3	–	6	–	0
Geneva		–		2	–	5	–	2
Saint Joseph's		–		2	–	5	–	1
Cornell		–		2	–	5	–	0
Lafayette		–		2	–	6	–	0
Norwich		–		2	–	6	–	0
Bowdoin		–		0	–	6	–	1
Lowell Textile		–		0	–	7	–	1
Rankings from Associated Press

The 1934 Harvard Crimson football team was an American football team that represented Harvard University as an independent during the 1934 college football season. In its fourth and final season under head coach Eddie Casey, the team compiled a 3–5 record and was outscored opponents by a total of 99 to 84. The team played its home games at Harvard Stadium in Boston.

== Schedule ==
Date	Opponent	Site	Result	Attendance	Source
October 6	Bates	Harvard Stadium; Boston, MA	W 12–0		
October 13	Brown	Harvard Stadium; Boston, MA	W 13–0		
October 20	Holy Cross	Harvard Stadium; Boston, MA	L 6–26		
October 27	Dartmouth	Harvard Stadium; Boston, MA (rivalry)	L 0–10	35,000	
November 3	Princeton	Harvard Stadium; Boston, MA	L 0–19	35,000	
November 10	Army	Harvard Stadium; Boston, MA	L 6–27		
November 17	New Hampshire	Harvard Stadium; Boston, MA	W 47–3	15,000	
November 24	at Yale	Yale Bowl; New Haven, CT (rivalry)	L 0–14		
