= 1934 Drexel Dragons football team =

American college football season

1934 Drexel Dragons football
- Conference: Independent
- Record: 4–3–1
- Head coach: Walter Halas (8th season)
- Captain: Samuel Potter
- Home stadium: Drexel Field

1934 Eastern college football independents records
	Conf.			Overall
Team	W	L	T	W		L		T
Tufts		–		8	–	0	–	0
Trinity (CT)		–		7	–	0	–	0
La Salle		–		7	–	0	–	1
Washington College		–		5	–	0	–	1
Franklin & Marshall		–		8	–	1	–	0
No. 4 Pittsburgh		–		8	–	1	–	0
No. 8 Colgate		–		7	–	1	–	0
Columbia		–		7	–	1	–	0
No. 5 Princeton		–		7	–	1	–	0
Duquesne		–		8	–	2	–	0
Holy Cross		–		8	–	2	–	0
No. 15 Temple		–		7	–	1	–	2
No. 10 Syracuse		–		6	–	2	–	0
Bucknell		–		7	–	2	–	2
No. 14 Army		–		7	–	3	–	0
Northeastern		–		6	–	1	–	1
Rochester		–		5	–	2	–	0
Dartmouth		–		6	–	3	–	0
Saint Anselm		–		6	–	3	–	0
Amherst		–		5	–	3	–	0
Fordham		–		5	–	3	–	0
Yale		–		5	–	3	–	0
Massachusetts State		–		5	–	3	–	1
CCNY		–		4	–	3	–	0
Providence		–		4	–	3	–	0
Drexel		–		4	–	3	–	1
Boston College		–		5	–	4	–	0
Bates		–		3	–	3	–	1
Middlebury		–		3	–	3	–	1
Penn		–		4	–	4	–	0
Penn State		–		4	–	4	–	0
Williams		–		4	–	4	–	0
Carnegie Tech		–		4	–	5	–	0
Washington & Jefferson		–		4	–	5	–	0
Villanova		–		3	–	4	–	2
NYU		–		3	–	4	–	1
Boston University		–		3	–	4	–	0
Colby		–		3	–	4	–	0
Springfield		–		2	–	3	–	3
Manhattan		–		3	–	5	–	1
Harvard		–		3	–	5	–	0
Vermont		–		2	–	4	–	2
Wesleyan		–		3	–	5	–	0
Brown		–		3	–	6	–	0
Geneva		–		2	–	5	–	2
Saint Joseph's		–		2	–	5	–	1
Cornell		–		2	–	5	–	0
Lafayette		–		2	–	6	–	0
Norwich		–		2	–	6	–	0
Bowdoin		–		0	–	6	–	1
Lowell Textile		–		0	–	7	–	1
Rankings from Associated Press

1934 Drexel Dragons football team was head coach by Walter Halas.

== Schedule ==
Date	Time	Opponent	Site	Result	Source
September 29		Juniata	Drexel Field; Philadelphia, PA	W 6–0	
October 6		West Chester	Drexel Field; Philadelphia, PA	L 0–6	
October 13		Upsala	Drexel Field; Philadelphia, PA	W 53–6	
October 20		Lebanon Valley	Drexel Field; Philadelphia, PA	W 8–7	
October 27		at CCNY	Lewisohn Stadium; New York, NY	L 7–12	
November 3		at Ursinus	Patterson Field; Collegeville, PA	T 0–0	
November 10		Susquehanna^{†}	Drexel Field; Philadelphia, PA	W 31–0	
November 17	2:15 pm	at Delaware	Frazer Field; Newark, DE	L 6–7	
^{†}Homecoming

== Roster ==
1934 Drexel Dragons football team roster
Players
Coaches
Offense

Pos.	#	Name	Class
TE	59	Harry Brevda
OT	28	Albert Fitzgerald	So
G	21	George Smullen
C	19	Joseph Rhile	So
G	27	George Stevens	So
OT	26	Arthur Mered Hoff	Jr
TE	69	Henry Wallace
HB	1	Samuel Potter (C)	Jr
HB	25	Raymond Wirth
FB	9	George Baker
QB	16	Charlie Knapp	Jr
G	22	Jerry Agnes
C	37	Jack Bader
G	17	Isadore Caplan
HB	18	David Curry	So
TE	31	Matthew Donaldson
C	34	Daniel Dugan
C	75	Donald Dughie
OT	12	DeLacy Ferris
G	29	Charles Foltz	Jr
FB	86	Harry Fox	So
HB	65	A. Guerrina
HB	24	William McFadden
TE	56	George Mandl
OT	6	Lewis Merrifield
HB	14	John Murray
FB	5	Ralph Petchik
QB	70	Anthony Sarli
OT	7	William C Schaffer
OT	30	Martin Smolak
QB	38	Ross Tippin	So
TE	40	Anthony Tomasso
C	46	Bernard Yanchulis

Defense

Pos.	#	Name	Class

Special teams

Pos.	#	Name	Class

Head coach

- Walter Halas (Illinois)

Coordinators/assistant coaches

- Rae Crowther (Colgate)
- Albert H. Repscha (Maine)

Legend

- (C) Team captain
- (S) Suspended
- (I) Ineligible
- Injured
- Redshirt
