= 1934 Tufts Jumbos football team =

American college football season

1934 Tufts Jumbos football
- Conference: Independent
- Record: 8–0
- Head coach: Lewis Manly (5th season)
- Captain: Walter Froehlich
- Home stadium: Tufts Oval

1934 Eastern college football independents records
	Conf.			Overall
Team	W	L	T	W		L		T
Tufts		–		8	–	0	–	0
Trinity (CT)		–		7	–	0	–	0
La Salle		–		7	–	0	–	1
Washington College		–		5	–	0	–	1
Franklin & Marshall		–		8	–	1	–	0
No. 4 Pittsburgh		–		8	–	1	–	0
No. 8 Colgate		–		7	–	1	–	0
Columbia		–		7	–	1	–	0
No. 5 Princeton		–		7	–	1	–	0
Duquesne		–		8	–	2	–	0
Holy Cross		–		8	–	2	–	0
No. 15 Temple		–		7	–	1	–	2
No. 10 Syracuse		–		6	–	2	–	0
Bucknell		–		7	–	2	–	2
No. 14 Army		–		7	–	3	–	0
Northeastern		–		6	–	1	–	1
Rochester		–		5	–	2	–	0
Dartmouth		–		6	–	3	–	0
Saint Anselm		–		6	–	3	–	0
Amherst		–		5	–	3	–	0
Fordham		–		5	–	3	–	0
Yale		–		5	–	3	–	0
Massachusetts State		–		5	–	3	–	1
CCNY		–		4	–	3	–	0
Providence		–		4	–	3	–	0
Drexel		–		4	–	3	–	1
Boston College		–		5	–	4	–	0
Bates		–		3	–	3	–	1
Middlebury		–		3	–	3	–	1
Penn		–		4	–	4	–	0
Penn State		–		4	–	4	–	0
Williams		–		4	–	4	–	0
Carnegie Tech		–		4	–	5	–	0
Washington & Jefferson		–		4	–	5	–	0
Villanova		–		3	–	4	–	2
NYU		–		3	–	4	–	1
Boston University		–		3	–	4	–	0
Colby		–		3	–	4	–	0
Springfield		–		2	–	3	–	3
Manhattan		–		3	–	5	–	1
Harvard		–		3	–	5	–	0
Vermont		–		2	–	4	–	2
Wesleyan		–		3	–	5	–	0
Brown		–		3	–	6	–	0
Geneva		–		2	–	5	–	2
Saint Joseph's		–		2	–	5	–	1
Cornell		–		2	–	5	–	0
Lafayette		–		2	–	6	–	0
Norwich		–		2	–	6	–	0
Bowdoin		–		0	–	6	–	1
Lowell Textile		–		0	–	7	–	1
Rankings from Associated Press

The 1934 Tufts Jumbos football team represented Tufts University in the 1934 college football season. Led by Lewis Manly in his fifth year as head coach, Tufts finished the season with a perfect record of 8–0.

== Schedule ==
Date	Opponent	Site	Result	Attendance	Source
October 6	Colby	Tufts Oval; Medford, MA	W 7–0		
October 15	at Boston University	Nickerson Field; Weston, MA	W 6–0		
October 20	Connecticut State	Tufts Oval; Medford, MA	W 14–0	3,000	
October 27	at Williams	Williamstown, MA	W 7–0		
November 3	New Hampshire	Tufts Oval; Medford, MA	W 26–0	3,500	
November 10	Middlebury	Tufts Oval; Medford, MA	W 18–3		
November 17	at Bowdoin	Whittier Field; Brunswick, ME	W 7–6		
November 24	Massachusetts State	Tufts Oval; Medford, MA	W 6–0		
