= 1934 Boston University Terriers football team =

American college football season

1934 Boston University Terriers football
- Conference: Independent
- Record: 3–4
- Head coach: Pat Hanley (1st season)
- Home stadium: Nickerson Field

1934 Eastern college football independents records
	Conf.			Overall
Team	W	L	T	W		L		T
Tufts		–		8	–	0	–	0
Trinity (CT)		–		7	–	0	–	0
La Salle		–		7	–	0	–	1
Washington College		–		5	–	0	–	1
Franklin & Marshall		–		8	–	1	–	0
No. 4 Pittsburgh		–		8	–	1	–	0
No. 8 Colgate		–		7	–	1	–	0
Columbia		–		7	–	1	–	0
No. 5 Princeton		–		7	–	1	–	0
Duquesne		–		8	–	2	–	0
Holy Cross		–		8	–	2	–	0
No. 15 Temple		–		7	–	1	–	2
No. 10 Syracuse		–		6	–	2	–	0
Bucknell		–		7	–	2	–	2
No. 14 Army		–		7	–	3	–	0
Northeastern		–		6	–	1	–	1
Rochester		–		5	–	2	–	0
Dartmouth		–		6	–	3	–	0
Saint Anselm		–		6	–	3	–	0
Amherst		–		5	–	3	–	0
Fordham		–		5	–	3	–	0
Yale		–		5	–	3	–	0
Massachusetts State		–		5	–	3	–	1
CCNY		–		4	–	3	–	0
Providence		–		4	–	3	–	0
Drexel		–		4	–	3	–	1
Boston College		–		5	–	4	–	0
Bates		–		3	–	3	–	1
Middlebury		–		3	–	3	–	1
Penn		–		4	–	4	–	0
Penn State		–		4	–	4	–	0
Williams		–		4	–	4	–	0
Carnegie Tech		–		4	–	5	–	0
Washington & Jefferson		–		4	–	5	–	0
Villanova		–		3	–	4	–	2
NYU		–		3	–	4	–	1
Boston University		–		3	–	4	–	0
Colby		–		3	–	4	–	0
Springfield		–		2	–	3	–	3
Manhattan		–		3	–	5	–	1
Harvard		–		3	–	5	–	0
Vermont		–		2	–	4	–	2
Wesleyan		–		3	–	5	–	0
Brown		–		3	–	6	–	0
Geneva		–		2	–	5	–	2
Saint Joseph's		–		2	–	5	–	1
Cornell		–		2	–	5	–	0
Lafayette		–		2	–	6	–	0
Norwich		–		2	–	6	–	0
Bowdoin		–		0	–	6	–	1
Lowell Textile		–		0	–	7	–	1
Rankings from Associated Press

The 1934 Boston University Terriers football team was an American football team that represented Boston University as an independent during the 1934 college football season. In its first season under head coach Pat Hanley, the team compiled a 3–4 record and was outscored by a total of 104 to 40.

== Schedule ==
Date	Opponent	Site	Result	Attendance	Source
September 29	at Brown	Providence, RI	L 0–18		
October 6	New Hampshire	Nickerson Field; Weston, MA	W 13–12		
October 13	Tufts	Nickerson Field; Weston, MA	L 0–6		
October 20	at Bates	Lewiston, ME	W 8–6		
October 27	at Vermont	Centennial Field; Burlington, VT	W 19–0		
November 3	at Rutgers	Neilson Field; New Brunswick, NJ	L 0–52	4,000	
November 17	at Boston College	Alumni Field; Chestnut Hill, MA	L 0–10	10,000	
