= 1934 Cornell Big Red football team =

American college football season

1934 Cornell Big Red football
- Conference: Independent
- Record: 2–5
- Head coach: Gil Dobie (15th season)
- Offensive scheme: Single-wing
- Base defense: 6–3–2
- Captain: Walt Switzer
- Home stadium: Schoellkopf Field

1934 Eastern college football independents records
	Conf.			Overall
Team	W	L	T	W		L		T
Tufts		–		8	–	0	–	0
Trinity (CT)		–		7	–	0	–	0
La Salle		–		7	–	0	–	1
Washington College		–		5	–	0	–	1
Franklin & Marshall		–		8	–	1	–	0
No. 4 Pittsburgh		–		8	–	1	–	0
No. 8 Colgate		–		7	–	1	–	0
Columbia		–		7	–	1	–	0
No. 5 Princeton		–		7	–	1	–	0
Duquesne		–		8	–	2	–	0
Holy Cross		–		8	–	2	–	0
No. 15 Temple		–		7	–	1	–	2
No. 10 Syracuse		–		6	–	2	–	0
Bucknell		–		7	–	2	–	2
No. 14 Army		–		7	–	3	–	0
Northeastern		–		6	–	1	–	1
Rochester		–		5	–	2	–	0
Dartmouth		–		6	–	3	–	0
Saint Anselm		–		6	–	3	–	0
Amherst		–		5	–	3	–	0
Fordham		–		5	–	3	–	0
Yale		–		5	–	3	–	0
Massachusetts State		–		5	–	3	–	1
CCNY		–		4	–	3	–	0
Providence		–		4	–	3	–	0
Drexel		–		4	–	3	–	1
Boston College		–		5	–	4	–	0
Bates		–		3	–	3	–	1
Middlebury		–		3	–	3	–	1
Penn		–		4	–	4	–	0
Penn State		–		4	–	4	–	0
Williams		–		4	–	4	–	0
Carnegie Tech		–		4	–	5	–	0
Washington & Jefferson		–		4	–	5	–	0
Villanova		–		3	–	4	–	2
NYU		–		3	–	4	–	1
Boston University		–		3	–	4	–	0
Colby		–		3	–	4	–	0
Springfield		–		2	–	3	–	3
Manhattan		–		3	–	5	–	1
Harvard		–		3	–	5	–	0
Vermont		–		2	–	4	–	2
Wesleyan		–		3	–	5	–	0
Brown		–		3	–	6	–	0
Geneva		–		2	–	5	–	2
Saint Joseph's		–		2	–	5	–	1
Cornell		–		2	–	5	–	0
Lafayette		–		2	–	6	–	0
Norwich		–		2	–	6	–	0
Bowdoin		–		0	–	6	–	1
Lowell Textile		–		0	–	7	–	1
Rankings from Associated Press

The 1934 Cornell Big Red football team was an American football team that represented Cornell University during the 1934 college football season. In their 15th season under head coach Gil Dobie, the Big Red compiled a 2–5 record and outscored their opponents by a combined total of 114 to 55.

== Schedule ==
Date	Opponent	Site	Result	Attendance	Source
September 29	St. Lawrence	Schoellkopf Field; Ithaca, NY	W 14–0		
October 6	Richmond	Schoellkopf Field; Ithaca, NY	L 0–6	2,100	
October 13	Syracuse	Schoellkopf Field; Ithaca, NY	L 7–20		
October 27	at Princeton	Palmer Stadium; Princeton, NJ	L 0–45		
November 3	at Columbia	Baker Field; New York, NY (rivalry)	L 0–14		
November 17	Dartmouth	Schoellkopf Field; Ithaca, NY (rivalry)	W 21–6		
November 29	at Penn	Franklin Field; Philadelphia, PA (rivalry)	L 13–23		
