= 1934 Brown Bears football team =

American college football season

1934 Brown Bears football
- Conference: Independent
- Record: 3–6
- Head coach: Tuss McLaughry (9th season)
- Home stadium: Brown Stadium

1934 Eastern college football independents records
	Conf.			Overall
Team	W	L	T	W		L		T
Tufts		–		8	–	0	–	0
Trinity (CT)		–		7	–	0	–	0
La Salle		–		7	–	0	–	1
Washington College		–		5	–	0	–	1
Franklin & Marshall		–		8	–	1	–	0
No. 4 Pittsburgh		–		8	–	1	–	0
No. 8 Colgate		–		7	–	1	–	0
Columbia		–		7	–	1	–	0
No. 5 Princeton		–		7	–	1	–	0
Duquesne		–		8	–	2	–	0
Holy Cross		–		8	–	2	–	0
No. 15 Temple		–		7	–	1	–	2
No. 10 Syracuse		–		6	–	2	–	0
Bucknell		–		7	–	2	–	2
No. 14 Army		–		7	–	3	–	0
Northeastern		–		6	–	1	–	1
Rochester		–		5	–	2	–	0
Dartmouth		–		6	–	3	–	0
Saint Anselm		–		6	–	3	–	0
Amherst		–		5	–	3	–	0
Fordham		–		5	–	3	–	0
Yale		–		5	–	3	–	0
Massachusetts State		–		5	–	3	–	1
CCNY		–		4	–	3	–	0
Providence		–		4	–	3	–	0
Drexel		–		4	–	3	–	1
Boston College		–		5	–	4	–	0
Bates		–		3	–	3	–	1
Middlebury		–		3	–	3	–	1
Penn		–		4	–	4	–	0
Penn State		–		4	–	4	–	0
Williams		–		4	–	4	–	0
Carnegie Tech		–		4	–	5	–	0
Washington & Jefferson		–		4	–	5	–	0
Villanova		–		3	–	4	–	2
NYU		–		3	–	4	–	1
Boston University		–		3	–	4	–	0
Colby		–		3	–	4	–	0
Springfield		–		2	–	3	–	3
Manhattan		–		3	–	5	–	1
Harvard		–		3	–	5	–	0
Vermont		–		2	–	4	–	2
Wesleyan		–		3	–	5	–	0
Brown		–		3	–	6	–	0
Geneva		–		2	–	5	–	2
Saint Joseph's		–		2	–	5	–	1
Cornell		–		2	–	5	–	0
Lafayette		–		2	–	6	–	0
Norwich		–		2	–	6	–	0
Bowdoin		–		0	–	6	–	1
Lowell Textile		–		0	–	7	–	1
Rankings from Associated Press

The 1934 Brown Bears football team represented Brown University as an independent during the 1934 college football season. Led by ninth-year head coach Tuss McLaughry, the Bears compiled a record of 3–6.

== Schedule ==
Date	Opponent	Site	Result	Source
September 29	Boston University	Brown Stadium; Providence, RI	W 18–0	
October 6	Rhode Island State	Brown Stadium; Providence, RI (rivalry)	W 13–0	
October 13	at Harvard	Harvard Stadium; Boston, MA	L 0–13	
October 20	at Yale	Yale Bowl; New Haven, CT	L 0–37	
October 27	Syracuse	Brown Stadium; Providence, RI	L 0–33	
November 3	Springfield	Brown Stadium; Providence, RI	W 13–7	
November 10	at Columbia	Baker Field; New York NY	L 0–39	
November 17	Holy Cross	Brown Stadium; Providence, RI	L 7–20	
December 1	Colgate	Brown Stadium; Providence, RI	L 13–20	
