= 1934 Penn Quakers football team =

American college football season

1934 Penn Quakers football
- Conference: Independent
- Record: 4–4
- Head coach: Harvey Harman (4th season)
- Captain: John Pennypacker
- Home stadium: Franklin Field

1934 Eastern college football independents records
	Conf.			Overall
Team	W	L	T	W		L		T
Tufts		–		8	–	0	–	0
Trinity (CT)		–		7	–	0	–	0
La Salle		–		7	–	0	–	1
Washington College		–		5	–	0	–	1
Franklin & Marshall		–		8	–	1	–	0
No. 4 Pittsburgh		–		8	–	1	–	0
No. 8 Colgate		–		7	–	1	–	0
Columbia		–		7	–	1	–	0
No. 5 Princeton		–		7	–	1	–	0
Duquesne		–		8	–	2	–	0
Holy Cross		–		8	–	2	–	0
No. 15 Temple		–		7	–	1	–	2
No. 10 Syracuse		–		6	–	2	–	0
Bucknell		–		7	–	2	–	2
No. 14 Army		–		7	–	3	–	0
Northeastern		–		6	–	1	–	1
Rochester		–		5	–	2	–	0
Dartmouth		–		6	–	3	–	0
Saint Anselm		–		6	–	3	–	0
Amherst		–		5	–	3	–	0
Fordham		–		5	–	3	–	0
Yale		–		5	–	3	–	0
Massachusetts State		–		5	–	3	–	1
CCNY		–		4	–	3	–	0
Providence		–		4	–	3	–	0
Drexel		–		4	–	3	–	1
Boston College		–		5	–	4	–	0
Bates		–		3	–	3	–	1
Middlebury		–		3	–	3	–	1
Penn		–		4	–	4	–	0
Penn State		–		4	–	4	–	0
Williams		–		4	–	4	–	0
Carnegie Tech		–		4	–	5	–	0
Washington & Jefferson		–		4	–	5	–	0
Villanova		–		3	–	4	–	2
NYU		–		3	–	4	–	1
Boston University		–		3	–	4	–	0
Colby		–		3	–	4	–	0
Springfield		–		2	–	3	–	3
Manhattan		–		3	–	5	–	1
Harvard		–		3	–	5	–	0
Vermont		–		2	–	4	–	2
Wesleyan		–		3	–	5	–	0
Brown		–		3	–	6	–	0
Geneva		–		2	–	5	–	2
Saint Joseph's		–		2	–	5	–	1
Cornell		–		2	–	5	–	0
Lafayette		–		2	–	6	–	0
Norwich		–		2	–	6	–	0
Bowdoin		–		0	–	6	–	1
Lowell Textile		–		0	–	7	–	1
Rankings from Associated Press

The 1934 Penn Quakers football team was an American football team that represented the University of Pennsylvania as an independent during the 1934 college football season. In its fourth season under head coach Harvey Harman, the team compiled a 4–4 record and outscored opponents by a total of 118 to 83. The team played its home games at Franklin Field in Philadelphia.

== Schedule ==
Date	Opponent	Site	Result	Attendance	Source
October 6	Ursinus	Franklin Field; Philadelphia, PA (rivalry)	L 6–7		
October 13	at Yale	Yale Bowl; New Haven, CT	L 6–14		
October 20	Rutgers	Franklin Field; Philadelphia, PA	W 27–19	25,000	
October 27	Navy	Franklin Field; Philadelphia, PA	L 0–17		
November 3	Lafayette	Franklin Field; Philadelphia, PA	W 41–0		
November 10	Penn State	Franklin Field; Philadelphia, PA	W 3–0	35,000	
November 17	Columbia	Franklin Field; Philadelphia, PA	L 12–13	45,000	
November 29	Cornell	Franklin Field; Philadelphia, PA (rivalry)	W 23–13		
