= 1934 Penn State Nittany Lions football team =

American college football season

1934 Penn State Nittany Lions football
- Conference: Independent
- Record: 4–4
- Head coach: Bob Higgins (5th season)
- Captain: M. B. Morrison
- Home stadium: New Beaver Field

1934 Eastern college football independents records
	Conf.			Overall
Team	W	L	T	W		L		T
Tufts		–		8	–	0	–	0
Trinity (CT)		–		7	–	0	–	0
La Salle		–		7	–	0	–	1
Washington College		–		5	–	0	–	1
Franklin & Marshall		–		8	–	1	–	0
No. 4 Pittsburgh		–		8	–	1	–	0
No. 8 Colgate		–		7	–	1	–	0
Columbia		–		7	–	1	–	0
No. 5 Princeton		–		7	–	1	–	0
Duquesne		–		8	–	2	–	0
Holy Cross		–		8	–	2	–	0
No. 15 Temple		–		7	–	1	–	2
No. 10 Syracuse		–		6	–	2	–	0
Bucknell		–		7	–	2	–	2
No. 14 Army		–		7	–	3	–	0
Northeastern		–		6	–	1	–	1
Rochester		–		5	–	2	–	0
Dartmouth		–		6	–	3	–	0
Saint Anselm		–		6	–	3	–	0
Amherst		–		5	–	3	–	0
Fordham		–		5	–	3	–	0
Yale		–		5	–	3	–	0
Massachusetts State		–		5	–	3	–	1
CCNY		–		4	–	3	–	0
Providence		–		4	–	3	–	0
Drexel		–		4	–	3	–	1
Boston College		–		5	–	4	–	0
Bates		–		3	–	3	–	1
Middlebury		–		3	–	3	–	1
Penn		–		4	–	4	–	0
Penn State		–		4	–	4	–	0
Williams		–		4	–	4	–	0
Carnegie Tech		–		4	–	5	–	0
Washington & Jefferson		–		4	–	5	–	0
Villanova		–		3	–	4	–	2
NYU		–		3	–	4	–	1
Boston University		–		3	–	4	–	0
Colby		–		3	–	4	–	0
Springfield		–		2	–	3	–	3
Manhattan		–		3	–	5	–	1
Harvard		–		3	–	5	–	0
Vermont		–		2	–	4	–	2
Wesleyan		–		3	–	5	–	0
Brown		–		3	–	6	–	0
Geneva		–		2	–	5	–	2
Saint Joseph's		–		2	–	5	–	1
Cornell		–		2	–	5	–	0
Lafayette		–		2	–	6	–	0
Norwich		–		2	–	6	–	0
Bowdoin		–		0	–	6	–	1
Lowell Textile		–		0	–	7	–	1
Rankings from Associated Press

The 1934 Penn State Nittany Lions football team represented the Pennsylvania State University as an independent during the 1934 college football season. The team was coached by Bob Higgins and played its home games in New Beaver Field in State College, Pennsylvania.

== Schedule ==
Date	Opponent	Site	Result	Attendance	Source
October 6	Lebanon Valley	New Beaver Field; State College, PA	W 13–0	5,422	
October 13	Gettysburg	New Beaver Field; State College, PA	W 32–6	6,797	
October 20	at Lehigh	Taylor Stadium; Bethlehem, PA	W 31–0		
October 27	at Columbia	Baker Field; New York, NY	L 7–14		
November 3	Syracuse^{†}	New Beaver Field; State College, PA (rivalry)	L 0–16	8,013	
November 10	at Penn	Franklin Field; Philadelphia, PA	L 0–3	35,000	
November 17	Lafayette	New Beaver Field; State College, PA	W 25–6	5,775	
November 24	at Bucknell	Memorial Stadium; Lewisburg, PA	L 7–13	10,000	
^{†}Homecoming
