= 1934 Syracuse Orangemen football team =

American college football season

1934 Syracuse Orangemen football
- Conference: Independent
- Record: 6–2
- Head coach: Vic Hanson (5th season)
- Captain: James Steen
- Home stadium: Archbold Stadium

1934 Eastern college football independents records
	Conf.			Overall
Team	W	L	T	W		L		T
Tufts		–		8	–	0	–	0
Trinity (CT)		–		7	–	0	–	0
La Salle		–		7	–	0	–	1
Washington College		–		5	–	0	–	1
Franklin & Marshall		–		8	–	1	–	0
No. 4 Pittsburgh		–		8	–	1	–	0
No. 8 Colgate		–		7	–	1	–	0
Columbia		–		7	–	1	–	0
No. 5 Princeton		–		7	–	1	–	0
Duquesne		–		8	–	2	–	0
Holy Cross		–		8	–	2	–	0
No. 15 Temple		–		7	–	1	–	2
No. 10 Syracuse		–		6	–	2	–	0
Bucknell		–		7	–	2	–	2
No. 14 Army		–		7	–	3	–	0
Northeastern		–		6	–	1	–	1
Rochester		–		5	–	2	–	0
Dartmouth		–		6	–	3	–	0
Saint Anselm		–		6	–	3	–	0
Amherst		–		5	–	3	–	0
Fordham		–		5	–	3	–	0
Yale		–		5	–	3	–	0
Massachusetts State		–		5	–	3	–	1
CCNY		–		4	–	3	–	0
Providence		–		4	–	3	–	0
Drexel		–		4	–	3	–	1
Boston College		–		5	–	4	–	0
Bates		–		3	–	3	–	1
Middlebury		–		3	–	3	–	1
Penn		–		4	–	4	–	0
Penn State		–		4	–	4	–	0
Williams		–		4	–	4	–	0
Carnegie Tech		–		4	–	5	–	0
Washington & Jefferson		–		4	–	5	–	0
Villanova		–		3	–	4	–	2
NYU		–		3	–	4	–	1
Boston University		–		3	–	4	–	0
Colby		–		3	–	4	–	0
Springfield		–		2	–	3	–	3
Manhattan		–		3	–	5	–	1
Harvard		–		3	–	5	–	0
Vermont		–		2	–	4	–	2
Wesleyan		–		3	–	5	–	0
Brown		–		3	–	6	–	0
Geneva		–		2	–	5	–	2
Saint Joseph's		–		2	–	5	–	1
Cornell		–		2	–	5	–	0
Lafayette		–		2	–	6	–	0
Norwich		–		2	–	6	–	0
Bowdoin		–		0	–	6	–	1
Lowell Textile		–		0	–	7	–	1
Rankings from Associated Press

The 1934 Syracuse Orangemen football team represented Syracuse University as an independent during the 1934 college football season. The Orangemen were led by fifth-year head coach Vic Hanson and played their home games at Archbold Stadium in Syracuse, New York.

== Schedule ==
Date	Opponent	Site	Result	Attendance	Source
October 6	Clarkson	Archbold Stadium; Syracuse, NY	W 28–0	8,000	
October 13	at Cornell	Schoellkopf Field; Ithaca, NY	W 20–7	18,000	
October 20	Ohio Wesleyan	Archbold Stadium; Syracuse, NY	W 32–10	17,000	
October 27	at Brown	Brown Stadium; Providence, RI	W 33–0	7,000	
November 3	at Penn State	New Beaver Field; University Park, PA (rivalry)	W 16–0	11,000	
November 10	Michigan State	Archbold Stadium; Syracuse, NY	W 10–0	25,000	
November 17	Colgate	Archbold Stadium; Syracuse, NY (rivalry)	L 2–13	34,000	
November 25	at Columbia	Baker Field; New York, NY	L 0–12	32,000	
