= 1934 NYU Violets football team =

American college football season

1934 NYU Violets football
- Conference: Independent
- Record: 3–4–1
- Head coach: Mal Stevens (1st season)
- Home stadium: Ohio Field; Yankee Stadium

1934 Eastern college football independents records
	Conf.			Overall
Team	W	L	T	W		L		T
Tufts		–		8	–	0	–	0
Trinity (CT)		–		7	–	0	–	0
La Salle		–		7	–	0	–	1
Washington College		–		5	–	0	–	1
Franklin & Marshall		–		8	–	1	–	0
No. 4 Pittsburgh		–		8	–	1	–	0
No. 8 Colgate		–		7	–	1	–	0
Columbia		–		7	–	1	–	0
No. 5 Princeton		–		7	–	1	–	0
Duquesne		–		8	–	2	–	0
Holy Cross		–		8	–	2	–	0
No. 15 Temple		–		7	–	1	–	2
No. 10 Syracuse		–		6	–	2	–	0
Bucknell		–		7	–	2	–	2
No. 14 Army		–		7	–	3	–	0
Northeastern		–		6	–	1	–	1
Rochester		–		5	–	2	–	0
Dartmouth		–		6	–	3	–	0
Saint Anselm		–		6	–	3	–	0
Amherst		–		5	–	3	–	0
Fordham		–		5	–	3	–	0
Yale		–		5	–	3	–	0
Massachusetts State		–		5	–	3	–	1
CCNY		–		4	–	3	–	0
Providence		–		4	–	3	–	0
Drexel		–		4	–	3	–	1
Boston College		–		5	–	4	–	0
Bates		–		3	–	3	–	1
Middlebury		–		3	–	3	–	1
Penn		–		4	–	4	–	0
Penn State		–		4	–	4	–	0
Williams		–		4	–	4	–	0
Carnegie Tech		–		4	–	5	–	0
Washington & Jefferson		–		4	–	5	–	0
Villanova		–		3	–	4	–	2
NYU		–		3	–	4	–	1
Boston University		–		3	–	4	–	0
Colby		–		3	–	4	–	0
Springfield		–		2	–	3	–	3
Manhattan		–		3	–	5	–	1
Harvard		–		3	–	5	–	0
Vermont		–		2	–	4	–	2
Wesleyan		–		3	–	5	–	0
Brown		–		3	–	6	–	0
Geneva		–		2	–	5	–	2
Saint Joseph's		–		2	–	5	–	1
Cornell		–		2	–	5	–	0
Lafayette		–		2	–	6	–	0
Norwich		–		2	–	6	–	0
Bowdoin		–		0	–	6	–	1
Lowell Textile		–		0	–	7	–	1
Rankings from Associated Press

The 1934 NYU Violets football team was an American football team that represented New York University as an independent during the 1934 college football season. In its first year under head coach Mal Stevens, it compiled a 3–4–1 record.

== Schedule ==
Date	Opponent	Site	Result	Attendance	Source
October 6	Johns Hopkins	Ohio Field; Bronx, NY	W 32–0	2,500	
October 13	West Virginia Wesleyan	Ohio Field; Bronx, NY	L 3–21	15,000	
October 20	Lafayette	Yankee Stadium; Bronx, NY	W 12–7	6,500	
October 27	Georgetown	Yankee Stadium; Bronx, NY	T 0–0	15,000	
November 3	Carnegie Tech	Yankee Stadium; Bronx, NY	L 0–6		
November 10	CCNY	Ohio Field; Bronx, NY	W 38–13	14,000	
November 17	at Rutgers	Neilson Field; New Brunswick, NJ	L 7–22	10,000	
November 29	vs. Fordham	Yankee Stadium; Bronx, NY	L 13–39	25,000	
