= 1934 Princeton Tigers football team =

American college football season

1934 Princeton Tigers football
- Conference: Independent
- Record: 7–1
- Head coach: Fritz Crisler (3rd season)
- Captain: Elwood M. "Mose" Kalbaugh
- Home stadium: Palmer Stadium

1934 Eastern college football independents records
	Conf.			Overall
Team	W	L	T	W		L		T
Tufts		–		8	–	0	–	0
Trinity (CT)		–		7	–	0	–	0
La Salle		–		7	–	0	–	1
Washington College		–		5	–	0	–	1
Franklin & Marshall		–		8	–	1	–	0
No. 4 Pittsburgh		–		8	–	1	–	0
No. 8 Colgate		–		7	–	1	–	0
Columbia		–		7	–	1	–	0
No. 5 Princeton		–		7	–	1	–	0
Duquesne		–		8	–	2	–	0
Holy Cross		–		8	–	2	–	0
No. 15 Temple		–		7	–	1	–	2
No. 10 Syracuse		–		6	–	2	–	0
Bucknell		–		7	–	2	–	2
No. 14 Army		–		7	–	3	–	0
Northeastern		–		6	–	1	–	1
Rochester		–		5	–	2	–	0
Dartmouth		–		6	–	3	–	0
Saint Anselm		–		6	–	3	–	0
Amherst		–		5	–	3	–	0
Fordham		–		5	–	3	–	0
Yale		–		5	–	3	–	0
Massachusetts State		–		5	–	3	–	1
CCNY		–		4	–	3	–	0
Providence		–		4	–	3	–	0
Drexel		–		4	–	3	–	1
Boston College		–		5	–	4	–	0
Bates		–		3	–	3	–	1
Middlebury		–		3	–	3	–	1
Penn		–		4	–	4	–	0
Penn State		–		4	–	4	–	0
Williams		–		4	–	4	–	0
Carnegie Tech		–		4	–	5	–	0
Washington & Jefferson		–		4	–	5	–	0
Villanova		–		3	–	4	–	2
NYU		–		3	–	4	–	1
Boston University		–		3	–	4	–	0
Colby		–		3	–	4	–	0
Springfield		–		2	–	3	–	3
Manhattan		–		3	–	5	–	1
Harvard		–		3	–	5	–	0
Vermont		–		2	–	4	–	2
Wesleyan		–		3	–	5	–	0
Brown		–		3	–	6	–	0
Geneva		–		2	–	5	–	2
Saint Joseph's		–		2	–	5	–	1
Cornell		–		2	–	5	–	0
Lafayette		–		2	–	6	–	0
Norwich		–		2	–	6	–	0
Bowdoin		–		0	–	6	–	1
Lowell Textile		–		0	–	7	–	1
Rankings from Associated Press

The 1934 Princeton Tigers football team represented Princeton University in the 1934 college football season. The Tigers finished with a 7–1 record and outscored their opponents by a combined total of 280 to 38. Their sole loss was to Yale by a 7–0 score. No Princeton players were selected as first-team honorees on the 1934 College Football All-America Team.

== Schedule ==
Date	Opponent	Site	Result	Attendance	Source
October 6	Amherst	Palmer Stadium; Princeton, NJ	W 75–0	10,000	
October 13	Williams	Palmer Stadium; Princeton, NJ	W 35–6	12,000	
October 20	Washington & Lee	Palmer Stadium; Princeton, NJ	W 14–12	25,000	
October 27	Cornell	Palmer Stadium; Princeton, NJ	W 45–0	25,000	
November 3	at Harvard	Harvard Stadium; Boston, MA (rivalry)	W 19–0	35,000	
November 10	Lehigh	Palmer Stadium; Princeton, NJ	W 54–0	20,000	
November 17	Yale	Palmer Stadium; Princeton, NJ (rivalry)	L 0–7	52,000	
November 24	Dartmouth	Palmer Stadium; Princeton, NJ	W 38–13	40,000	
