= 1934 Army Cadets football team =

American college football season

1934 Army Cadets football
- Conference: Independent
- Record: 7–3
- Head coach: Garrison H. Davidson (2nd season)
- Captain: Joseph Stancook
- Home stadium: Michie Stadium

1934 Eastern college football independents records
	Conf.			Overall
Team	W	L	T	W		L		T
Tufts		–		8	–	0	–	0
Trinity (CT)		–		7	–	0	–	0
La Salle		–		7	–	0	–	1
Washington College		–		5	–	0	–	1
Franklin & Marshall		–		8	–	1	–	0
No. 4 Pittsburgh		–		8	–	1	–	0
No. 8 Colgate		–		7	–	1	–	0
Columbia		–		7	–	1	–	0
No. 5 Princeton		–		7	–	1	–	0
Duquesne		–		8	–	2	–	0
Holy Cross		–		8	–	2	–	0
No. 15 Temple		–		7	–	1	–	2
No. 10 Syracuse		–		6	–	2	–	0
Bucknell		–		7	–	2	–	2
No. 14 Army		–		7	–	3	–	0
Northeastern		–		6	–	1	–	1
Rochester		–		5	–	2	–	0
Dartmouth		–		6	–	3	–	0
Saint Anselm		–		6	–	3	–	0
Amherst		–		5	–	3	–	0
Fordham		–		5	–	3	–	0
Yale		–		5	–	3	–	0
Massachusetts State		–		5	–	3	–	1
CCNY		–		4	–	3	–	0
Providence		–		4	–	3	–	0
Drexel		–		4	–	3	–	1
Boston College		–		5	–	4	–	0
Bates		–		3	–	3	–	1
Middlebury		–		3	–	3	–	1
Penn		–		4	–	4	–	0
Penn State		–		4	–	4	–	0
Williams		–		4	–	4	–	0
Carnegie Tech		–		4	–	5	–	0
Washington & Jefferson		–		4	–	5	–	0
Villanova		–		3	–	4	–	2
NYU		–		3	–	4	–	1
Boston University		–		3	–	4	–	0
Colby		–		3	–	4	–	0
Springfield		–		2	–	3	–	3
Manhattan		–		3	–	5	–	1
Harvard		–		3	–	5	–	0
Vermont		–		2	–	4	–	2
Wesleyan		–		3	–	5	–	0
Brown		–		3	–	6	–	0
Geneva		–		2	–	5	–	2
Saint Joseph's		–		2	–	5	–	1
Cornell		–		2	–	5	–	0
Lafayette		–		2	–	6	–	0
Norwich		–		2	–	6	–	0
Bowdoin		–		0	–	6	–	1
Lowell Textile		–		0	–	7	–	1
Rankings from Associated Press

The 1934 Army Cadets football team represented the United States Military Academy as an independent during the 1934 college football season. In their second year under head coach Garrison H. Davidson, the Cadets compiled a 7–3 record, shut out five of their ten opponents, and outscored all opponents by a combined total of 215 to 40. In the annual Army–Navy Game, the Midshipmen won 3–0. The Cadets also lost to Notre Dame 12–6 and Illinois by a 7 to 0 score.

Halfback Jack Buckler was selected by the College Sports Writers as a second-team player on the All-America team.

== Schedule ==
Date	Opponent	Site	Result	Attendance	Source
September 29	Washburn	Michie Stadium; West Point, NY	W 19–0		
October 6	Davidson	Michie Stadium; West Point, NY	W 41–0	9,000	
October 13	Drake	Michie Stadium; West Point, NY	W 48–0		
October 20	Sewanee	Michie Stadium; West Point, NY	W 20–0		
October 27	at Yale	Yale Bowl; New Haven, CT	W 20–12		
November 3	at Illinois	Memorial Stadium; Champaign, IL	L 0–7	42,000	
November 10	at Harvard	Harvard Stadium; Boston, MA	W 27–6		
November 17	The Citadel	Michie Stadium; West Point, NY	W 34–0		
November 24	vs. Notre Dame	Yankee Stadium; Bronx, NY (rivalry)	L 6–12	78,757	
December 1	vs. Navy	Franklin Field; Philadelphia, PA (Army–Navy Game)	L 0–3		
