= 1934 Rutgers Queensmen football team =

American college football season

1934 Rutgers Queensmen football

Middle Three champion
- Conference: Middle Three Conference
- Record: 5–3–1 (2–0 Middle Three)
- Head coach: J. Wilder Tasker (4th season)
- Captain: Albert Twitchell
- Home stadium: Neilson Field

1934 Middle Three Conference football standings
	Conf.					Overall
Team	W		L		T	W		L		T
Rutgers $	2	–	0	–	0	5	–	3	–	1
Lehigh	1	–	1	–	0	4	–	4	–	0
Lafayette	0	–	2	–	0	2	–	6	–	0
$ – Conference champion

The 1934 Rutgers Queensmen football team represented Rutgers University in the 1934 college football season. In their fourth season under head coach J. Wilder Tasker, the Queensmen compiled a 5–3–1 record, won the Middle Three Conference championship, and outscored their opponents 184 to 68.

== Schedule ==
Date	Opponent	Site	Result	Attendance	Source
September 29	Pennsylvania Military	Neilson Field; New Brunswick, NJ	T 0–0	9,000	
October 6	at Franklin & Marshall	Williamson Field; Lancaster, PA	L 0–7		
October 13	Springfield	Neilson Field; New Brunswick, NJ	W 19–7	5,000	
October 20	at Penn	Franklin Field; Philadelphia, PA	L 19–27	25,000	
October 27	at Lehigh	Taylor Stadium; Bethlehem, PA	W 45–0		
November 3	Boston University	Neilson Field; New Brunswick, NJ	W 52–0	4,000	
November 10	Lafayette	Neilson Field; New Brunswick, NJ	W 27–6		
November 17	NYU	Neilson Field; New Brunswick, NJ	W 22–7	10,000	
November 24	Colgate	Neilson Field; New Brunswick, NJ	L 0–14	11,500	
