= George Van Bibber =

American football player, coach, and professor (1909–1982)

Biographical details
- Born: 1909
- Died: August 3, 1982 (aged 72–73); Willimantic, Connecticut, U.S.

Playing career
- 1928–1930: Purdue
- Position: Tackle

Coaching career (HC unless noted)
- 1931–1933: Central State (MI)
- 1934–1935: Buffalo

Administrative career (AD unless noted)
- 1934–1936: Buffalo
- 1936–1950: Connecticut

Head coaching record
- Overall: 16–19–3

Accomplishments and honors

Awards
- Second-team All-American (1930); First-team All-Big Ten (1930); Second-team All-Big Ten (1929)

Edward George Van Bibber (1909 – August 3, 1982) was an American college football player and coach and university professor. He served as the head football coach at Central Michigan University from 1931 to 1933 and at the University at Buffalo from 1934 to 1935, compiling a career college football record of 16–19–3. Van Bibber joined the faculty of the University of Connecticut in 1936 and was the director of the School of Physical Education there before retiring in 1969. He died on August 3, 1982, at the age of 73 after suffering a heart attack.

In 1936, Van Bibber coached the first full season of wrestling at the University at Buffalo, finishing with a record of 0–6.

Van Bibber was an alumnus of Purdue University, lettering in baseball and football. He was a member of the 1930 Big Ten Conference champion football team and was awarded the 1931 Big Ten Medal of Honor; other notable recipients include: John Wooden, Hank Stram, Bob Griese, Mike Phipps and Jim Everett.

== Head coaching record ==
Year	Team	Overall	Conference	Standing	Bowl/playoffs
Central State Bearcats (Independent) (1931–1933)
1931	Central State	4–3			
1932	Central State	3–4–1			
1933	Central State	5–2–1			
Central State:		12–9–2			
Buffalo Bulls (New York State Conference) (1934)
1934	Buffalo	2–4–1			
Buffalo Bulls (Independent) (1935)
1935	Buffalo	2–6			
Buffalo:		4–10–1			
Total:		16–19–3			
