= Whitey Ock =

American baseball player

- Catcher
- Born: March 17, 1912; Brooklyn, New York
- Died: March 18, 1975 (aged 63); Mt. Kisco, New York
- Batted: Right Threw: Right

MLB debut
- September 29, 1935, for the Brooklyn Dodgers

Last MLB appearance
- September 29, 1935, for the Brooklyn Dodgers

MLB statistics
- Batting average: .000
- Games played: 1
- Stats at Baseball Reference

Teams
- Brooklyn Dodgers (1935)

Harold David Ock (March 17, 1912 – March 18, 1975) was a professional baseball player who played catcher in one game for the 1935 Brooklyn Dodgers.

He graduated from Bushwick High School before attending Lehigh University where he played college baseball and football. In a 1933 baseball game against Villanova, he played catcher without a facemask or shinguards. He was elected captain of the Lehigh Engineers football team for their 1934 season.
