= 1934 Lehigh Engineers football team =

American college football season

1934 Lehigh Engineers football
- Conference: Middle Three Conference
- Record: 4–4 (1–1 Middle Three)
- Head coach: Glen Harmeson (1st season)
- Captain: Harold Ock
- Home stadium: Taylor Stadium

1934 Middle Three Conference football standings
	Conf.					Overall
Team	W		L		T	W		L		T
Rutgers $	2	–	0	–	0	5	–	3	–	1
Lehigh	1	–	1	–	0	4	–	4	–	0
Lafayette	0	–	2	–	0	2	–	6	–	0
$ – Conference champion

The 1934 Lehigh Engineers football team was an American football team that represented Lehigh University during the 1934 college football season. In its first season under head coach Glen Harmeson, the team compiled a 4–4 record, and split the two games against its Middle Three Conference rivals. Lehigh played home games at Taylor Stadium in Bethlehem, Pennsylvania.

== Schedule ==
Date	Opponent	Site	Result	Attendance	Source
October 6	Haverford*	Taylor Stadium; Bethlehem, PA	W 52–7		
October 13	at Johns Hopkins*	Homewood Field; Baltimore, MD	W 7–6		
October 20	Penn State*	Taylor Stadium; Bethlehem, PA	L 0–31	7,000	
October 27	Rutgers	Taylor Stadium; Bethlehem, PA	L 0–31		
November 3	at Gettysburg*	Memorial Stadium; Gettysburg, PA	L 0–14		
November 10	at Princeton*	Palmer Stadium; Princeton, NJ	L 0–54	25,000	
November 17	Muhlenberg*	Taylor Stadium; Bethlehem, PA	W 13–0		
November 24	at Lafayette	Fisher Field; Easton, PA (rivalry)	W 13–7	12,000	
*Non-conference game
