= George Ekaitis =

American Football player

Biographical details
- Born: July 15, 1906; Donora, Pennsylvania, U.S.
- Died: November 14, 1960 (aged 54); Atlantic City, New Jersey, U.S.

Playing career

Football
- 1927–1930: Western Maryland
- Position: Quarterback

Coaching career (HC unless noted)

Football
- 1933–1941: Washington College
- 1946–1947: Washington College

Lacrosse
- 1932–1934: Washington College

Track and field
- 1932–1932: Washington College
- 1946–1948: Washington College

Administrative career (AD unless noted)
- 1946–1948: Washington College

George Leo Ekaitis (July 15, 1906 – November 14, 1960) was an American college football player and coach and boxer. He attended Western Maryland College (now known as McDaniel College) where he played football and won the NCAA lightweight boxing championship before graduating in 1931. He served as the head football coach at Washington College in Chestertown, Maryland from 1933 to 1941 and 1946 to 1947. He also coached track and lacrosse at Washington College. He later coached football at Atlantic City High School in Atlantic City, New Jersey.

Ekaitis committed suicide in 1960. He was inducted into the Washington College Hall of Fame in 1984.
