= Boand System =

The Boand System was a system for determining the college football national championship. It was also known as the Azzi Ratem system (derived from "As I rate 'em"). The system was developed by William F. Boand. The rankings were based on mathematical formula. The Boand System is recognized as a "National Champion Major Selector" by the Official NCAA Division I Records Book.

Boand announced annual national champions on a current basis from 1930 to 1960. He also chose national champions on a retroactive basis for the years from 1919 to 1929. In the 1937 edition of The Illustrated Football Annual Boand went back and re-rated the seasons since 1924, this time including bowl game results in his calculations.

The rankings appeared in many newspapers, the Illustrated Football Annual from 1932 to 1942, and Football News from 1942 to 1944 and again from 1951 to 1960. The design of the system sought to combine the best parts of the Dickinson System, with mathematical systems developed by Ralph Powell of Ohio State University and William T. Van de Graaff, football coach and mathematics instructor at Colorado College. Prominent football coaches Knute Rockne, Howard Jones, and Pop Warner consulted with Boand on the rankings. At various times, the system was applied to high school football rankings.

== National champions ==
Season	Champion
Retrospective selections
1919	Illinois
1920	Harvard; Princeton
1921	California; Lafayette; Washington & Jefferson
1922	Princeton
1923	Illinois
1924	Notre Dame
1925	Alabama
1926	Navy
1927	Georgia
1927	Yale
1928	Georgia Tech
1929	Notre Dame
Boand System rankings
1930	Notre Dame
1931	Southern California
1932	Southern California
1933	Michigan
1934	Minnesota
1935	Minnesota
1936	Pittsburgh
1937	Pittsburgh
1938	Tennessee
1939	Texas A&M
1940	Minnesota
1941	Minnesota
1942	Ohio State
1943	Notre Dame
1944	Army
1945	Army
1946	Army; Notre Dame
1947	Notre Dame; Michigan
1948	Michigan
1949	Notre Dame
1950	Princeton
1951	Georgia Tech; Illinois
1952	Michigan State
1953	Notre Dame
1954	Ohio State
1955	Michigan State
1956	Oklahoma
1957	Ohio State
1958	Louisiana State
1959	Syracuse
1960	Iowa

=== Boand trophy ===
In February 1955, coach Woody Hayes was presented with the William F. Boand trophy in recognition of the 1954 Buckeyes' No. 1 selection in the year's final Azzi Ratem rankings. The award was presented by Byron F. Boyd, editor of Football News magazine, which carried Boand's ratings.

== See also ==
- NCAA Division I FBS national football championship
