= Toledo Cup =

College Football Award

- Sport: College football
- Awarded for: National Championship
- Sponsored by: Toledo Scale Company
- Country: United States

History
- First award: 1934
- Editions: 3
- Final award: 1936
- First winner: Minnesota
- Most wins: Minnesota (3)
- Most recent: Minnesota

The Toledo Cup was a trophy presented in the United States from 1934 to 1936 to the college football team recognized as national champions by a group of 250 sports editors from newspapers across the country.

The poll's rules stated that the first team to win the traveling trophy three times would retain permanent possession of the cup. The Minnesota Golden Gophers were promptly voted No. 1 for 1934, 1935, and 1936 and claimed the trophy. The Toledo Cup is currently displayed in the lobby of the Gibson-Nagurski Athletic Center at the University of Minnesota.

== Winners ==
Season	Team	Head coach	Record
1934	Minnesota	Bernie Bierman	8–0
1935	Minnesota	Bernie Bierman	8–0
1936	Minnesota	Bernie Bierman	7–1
