= 1934 college football rankings =

- Season: 1934
- Bowl season: 1934–35 bowl games
- End of season champions: Minnesota (Note: per AP poll, Boand System, Billingsley Report, Dickinson System (received Rockne Trophy), College Football Researchers Association, Helms Athletic Foundation, National Championship Foundation, Sagarin Ratings Elo chess method, and Sagarin Ratings Predictor method); Alabama (Note: per Dunkel System, Houlgate System, Litkenhous Ratings, Williamson System, Berryman QPRS, and Poling System)

The 1934 college football rankings included a poll of leading newspapers conducted by the Associated Press (AP), a poll of 250 sports writers conducted by the committee responsible for awarding the Toledo Cup to the nation's top college football team, and the Boand and Dickinson Systems, mathematical systems operated by William F. Boand and Frank G. Dickinson. The four ranking systems were unanimous in selecting the undefeated Minnesota Golden Gophers as the national champion.

== Champions (by ranking) ==
All major rankings (both contemporary and retroactive) have identified either Alabama or Minnesota to have been the season's champion.

- AP poll: Minnesota
- Berryman QPRS: Alabama
- Billingsley Report: Minnesota
- Boand System: Minnesota
- College Football Researchers Association: Minnesota
- Dickinson System: Minnesota
- Dunkel System: Alabama
- Helms Athletic Foundation: Minnesota
- Houlgate System: Alabama
- Litkenhous Ratings: Minnesota
- National Championship Foundation: Minnesota
- Poling System: Alabama
- Toledo Cup: Minnesota
- Sagarin Ratings Elo chess method: Minnesota
- Sagarin Ratings Predictor method: Minnesota
- Williamson System: Alabama

Note: AP poll, Boand System, Dickinson System, Dunkel System, Houlgate System, Litkenhous Ratings, Toledo Cup, and Williamson System were given contemporarily. All other methods were given retroactively.

== Associated Press poll ==
In mid-November 1934, the Associated Press published the results of its poll of the country's leading newspapers. The results of the poll were as follows:

Rank	Team	Points	1st	2nd	3rd	4th	5th	6th	7th	8th	9th	10th
1	Minnesota (8–0)	635	50	15	0	0	0	0	0	0	0	0
2	Stanford (9–1–1)	468	8.5	9.5	16.5	12.5	6	6	2	0	1	2
3	Alabama (10–0)	438.5	5.5	11.5	13	9	8	7	4	4	1	0
4	Pittsburgh (8–1)	420	1	20	11	9	9	2	2	1	2	0
5	Princeton (7–1)	300.5	4	7	9	8	6	7	8	8	5	5-1/2
6	Illinois (7–1)	183.5	0	5	2	3	8	7	6	6	11	3-1/2
7	Navy (8–1)	182	0	0	0	3	8	9	6	8	7	6
8	Colgate (7–1)	181.5	0	0	2	3	7	10	6	5	5	3-1/2
9	Ohio State (7–1)	170.5	0	3	2.5	4.5	4	4	7	2	4	6
10	Syracuse (6–2)	130.5	0	0	0	2	2	4	10	7	9	5-1/2
11	Santa Clara (7–2–1)	119	0	0	4	6	2	3	1	1	2	3
12	Rice (9–1–1)	106	0	1	0	1	3	1	7	6	5	11
13	LSU (7–2–2)	52	0	0	1	1	1	0	1	6	3	3
14	Army (7–3)	44	0	0	1	0	1	1	2	3	2	4
15	Temple (7–1–2)	21	0	0	0	0	0	2	0	1	3	2

== Toledo Cup ==
The Toledo Cup was based on ballots submitted by a national committee of 250 sports writers. The process was overseen by a committee including Westbrook Pegler, Avery Brundage, Gustavus Kirby, Lynn St. John, Wilbur C. Smith, Stewart Edward White, and Theodore Roosevelt Jr. In preliminary polling in December 1934, the results were as follows:

1. Minnesota (8–0) - 840 points
2. Alabama (10–0) - 361-1/4 points
3. Pittsburgh (8–1) - 281 points
4. Stanford (9–1–1) - 134-1/2 points
5. Ohio State (7–1) - 62 points
6. Temple (7–1–2) - 7 points
7. Colgate (7–1) - 6 points
8. LSU (7–2–2) - 4 points
9. Wisconsin (4–4) - 3 points
10. (tie) Princeton (7–1), Washington (6–1–1) - 1 point each

In final polling in January 1935, the results were as follows:

1. Minnesota - 224 votes
2. Alabama - 23 votes

== Boand System ==
The Boand System was a mathematical ranking system developed by William F. Boand and sometimes billed as the "Azzi Ratem" (as I rate 'em) system. Boand typically updated his rankings after the bowl games, but his post-bowl rankings have not been found. His final pre-bowl rankings released in mid-December 1934 were as follows:

1. Minnesota - 150 points
2. Pittsburgh - 147 points
3. Stanford - 137 points
3. Alabama - 137 points
5. Navy - 135 points
6. Ohio State - 132 points
6. Rice - 132 points
8. Temple - 127 points
9. Colgate - 125 points
10. Tennessee - 123 points
11. Columbia - 122 points
12. Tulane - 121 points
13. Illinois - 120 points
13. Texas - 120 points
15. Notre Dame - 118 points
15. LSU - 118 points
17. Washington - 117 points

== Dickinson System ==
The Dickinson System was a mathematical rating system devised by University of Illinois economics professor Frank G. Dickinson. For the first time, Professor Dickinson declared a team as national champion even though it did not receive the highest point total in his mathematical calculations. Minnesota qualified under a section of Dickinson's code providing that an undefeated team is ranked above a team it has defeated, regardless of the point standing. Minnesota had defeated Pittsburgh at Pitt Stadium, 13–7. Dickinson's final ratings were as follows:

1. Minnesota (8–0) - 23.51 points
2. Pittsburgh (8–1) - 24.19 points
3. Navy (8–1) - 23.00 points
4. Illinois (7–1) - 22.01 points
5. Rice (9–1–1) - 21.97 points
6. Alabama (10–0) - 21.70 points
7. Columbia (7–1) - 21.67 points
8. Ohio State (7–1) - 21.51 points
9. Colgate (7–1) - 21.06 points
10. Stanford (9–1–1) - 20.34 points
11. Tulane (10–1) - 20.03 points

== Houlgate System ==
The Houlgate System rankings for 1934 were as follows:

1. Stanford (9–1–1) - 32.5
2. Navy (8–1)
3. Alabama (10–0)
4. Pittsburgh (8–1)
5. Minnesota (8–0)

== See also ==
- 1934 College Football All-America Team
