= 1934 Lafayette Leopards football team =

American football club

1934 Lafayette Leopards football
- Conference: Middle Three Conference
- Record: 2–6 (0–2 Middle Three)
- Head coach: Herb McCracken (11th season)
- Captain: Charles Nesi
- Home stadium: Fisher Field

1934 Middle Three Conference football standings
	Conf.					Overall
Team	W		L		T	W		L		T
Rutgers $	2	–	0	–	0	5	–	3	–	1
Lehigh	1	–	1	–	0	4	–	4	–	0
Lafayette	0	–	2	–	0	2	–	6	–	0
$ – Conference champion

The 1934 Lafayette Leopards football team was an American football team that represented Lafayette College in the Middle Three Conference during the 1934 college football season. In its 11th season under head coach Herb McCracken, the team compiled a 2–6 record. Charles Nesi was the team captain.

== Schedule ==
Date	Opponent	Site	Result	Attendance	Source
October 6	Muhlenberg*	Fisher Field; Easton, PA	W 19–0		
October 13	Franklin & Marshall*	Fisher Field; Easton, PA	L 0–13		
October 20	at NYU*	Yankee Stadium; Bronx, NY	L 7–12	6,500	
October 27	Albright*	Fisher Field; Easton, PA	W 26–0		
November 3	at Penn*	Franklin Field; Philadelphia, PA	L 0–41		
November 10	at Rutgers	Neilson Field; New Brunswick, NJ	L 6–27		
November 17	at Penn State*	New Beaver Field; State College, PA	L 6–25	5,775	
November 24	Lehigh	Fisher Field; Easton, PA (rivalry)	L 7–13		
*Non-conference game
