= Saint Anselm Hawks =

American collegiate athletic teams

- University: Saint Anselm College
- NCAA: Division II (Division III in 2027)
- Conference: Northeast-10 Conference (primary); East Coast Conference (bowling); NEWHA (women's ice hockey-Division I); NEWMAC (primary; starting in 2027)
- Athletic director: Daron Montgomery
- Location: Goffstown, New Hampshire
- Varsity teams: 23 (as of 2023-24 academic year)
- Football stadium: Grappone Stadium
- Basketball arena: Stoutenburgh Gymnasium
- Ice hockey arena: Thomas F. Sullivan Arena
- Baseball stadium: Sullivan Park
- Softball stadium: South Athletic Fields
- Soccer stadium: Melucci Field
- Nickname: Hawks
- Colors: Blue and white
- Mascot: Hammer the Hawk
- Website: saintanselmhawks.com

Team NCAA championships
- 1

The Saint Anselm Hawks are the intercollegiate athletic teams that represent Saint Anselm College, located in Goffstown, New Hampshire. They are members of NCAA Division II for most sporting competitions.

The Hawks are primarily members of the Northeast-10 Conference, where 21 of their 23 sports compete. The two exceptions are women's ice hockey and women’s bowling, which compete as de facto Division I member in the New England Women's Hockey Alliance and the East Coast Conference, respectively.

On April 22, 2026, Saint Anselm announced that it will transition its athletics to Division III on July 1, 2027, with most teams joining the New England Women's and Men's Athletic Conference.

== Varsity teams ==
Men's sports	Women's sports
Baseball	Basketball
Basketball	Bowling
Cross country	Cross country
Football	Field hockey
Golf	Golf
Ice hockey	Ice hockey
Lacrosse	Lacrosse
Soccer	Soccer
Track and field^{1}	Softball
	Tennis
	Track and field^{1}
	Volleyball
^{1} – includes both, indoor and outdoor

== National championships ==
=== Team ===
Sport	Association	Division	Year	Opponent/Runner-up	Score
Field hockey (1)	NCAA	Division II	2024	Kutztown	1–0

== Individual programs ==
The college's athletic teams have been known as the Hawks since the mid-1930s. Prior to that, teams were "referred to as the Saints, the Hilltoppers, or simply St. Anselm's." In 1934, a contest was held to select a name, with Blue Jays as the winning entry. However, that name was dropped in favor of Hawks in 1935.

=== Football ===
The 1936 Saint Anselm Hawks football team finished the season undefeated, allowed zero points on defense, and knocked Holy Cross out of contention for the 1937 Rose Bowl.

College football returned to the Hilltop in 1999 after a 58-year hiatus brought about by the onset of World War II. The team has played its home games at Grappone Stadium since the program's resumption.

One of the college's greatest athletes was Ray "Scooter" McLean; he was coach of the Green Bay Packers in 1953 and 1958 and a National Football League (NFL) player for the Chicago Bears, winning NFL Championship Games in 1940, 1941, 1943 and 1946. In more recent years, Michael Geary (class of 2005) was a Second Team All NE-10 offensive lineman in 2003.

=== Ice hockey ===
Saint Anselm is known by locals as a "hockey school" as both the men's and women's teams have earned championships in their respective conferences. The men's team has won nine Northeast-10 Conference championships, (four in a row) most recently by defeating Saint Michael's in 2023. The Hawks performance in the 2012 Championship game set NE-10 records for most goals scored and largest margin of victory in a championship game. The women's team has earned the title of ECAC champions for two consecutive years, by defeating Holy Cross. In the 2012–13 season, the women held a record of 19–4–4 including a victory over Norwich University ending their 40-game win streak and earning them 3rd place over all in the D-III ECAC East standings. The campus has a multimillion-dollar, 65,000 square feet (6,000 m^{2}) ice arena, named after Thomas F. Sullivan. It is located next to Davison Dining Hall, and has a capacity of 2,700 fans.

=== Lacrosse ===
The Saint Anselm men's lacrosse team was runners up in the NE-10 Championship in 2021 and was nationally ranked at #8 after an undefeated regular season. They qualified for the NCAA Division II Championship where they beat Seton Hill in the 1st round of playoffs, and lost to Le Moyne in the Quarterfinals.
