= Lowell Technological Institute =

College in Lowell, Massachusetts

- Type: Public
- Established: 1895
- Students: 6,640
- Undergraduates: 6,126
- Postgraduates: 514
- Location: Lowell, Massachusetts, United States; 42°39′13.91″N 71°19′32.37″W
- Campus: Urban

The Lowell Technological Institute was a public college located in Lowell, Massachusetts, United States. It was founded in 1895 as the Lowell Textile School. Its campus is now part of the University of Massachusetts Lowell.

== History ==
=== Beginnings ===
Plans for the school were started when the Massachusetts State Legislature passed a law granting $25,000 to each of the four major textile cities in the state as long as they contributed to the building of a school of textiles in Lowell.

Southwick Hall in 1903

World War I era photo of Southwick and Kitson Hall

The Lowell Textile School opened on October 4, 1897. Originally, the first class had over 200 students. The school was modeled on the success of the Polytechnical School at Philadelphia. The school originally opened in three rented rooms on Middle Street in downtown Lowell. The college offered three year diplomas in cotton or wool manufacture, design, or textile chemistry and dyeing. Tuition at the time was one hundred dollars.

=== New building ===
In 1903, the school moved to the newly built Southwick Hall. In 1913, the school granted its first bachelor's degree in textile dyeing and textile engineering. During World War I, the grounds of the college were used as a military training camp. The school almost went bankrupt due to the increased demand for soldiers and textiles.

By 1929, Lowell’s expanded curriculum, larger faculty, and livelier extracurricular program warranted a name change that reflected its evolution from a trade school to a technical college, and it became the Lowell Textile Institute.

During World War II, the school almost went bankrupt again as war demanded soldiers and textiles. The enrollment of the school fell to 73 students at one point.

=== Expansion ===
In 1953, President Martin Lydon expanded the curriculum to include programs in plastics, leather, paper, and electronics technology, increased the liberal arts, and renamed the school the Lowell Technological Institute. The mission of the college moved towards general engineering, and a bachelor’s program was created in 1956. The textile program was closed in 1971, reflecting the closure of most of the mills in the city.

In 1947 the first two dormitories were built, Smith and Eames Hall. In 1967, they were built across the Merrimack River. In 1973, Lowell Technical Institute Dormitory was built near Leitch and Bourgeois Hall. At eighteen stories, the building, which was later renamed Fox Hall, is one of the tallest buildings in Lowell.

=== Merger ===
In 1972, a feasibility study was conducted on merging the school with the nearby Lowell State College. The schools merged in 1975 to form the University of Lowell, which changed its name to the University of Massachusetts Lowell in 1991. Today, Lowell Tech's campus is known as the North Campus of UMass Lowell.

== Staff ==
Notable staff members include:

- Dave Morey, coach (1916–1917, 1948–1959)
- Harry Lew. Basketball coach (1922) First African American professional basketball player
- Rusty Yarnall, Baseball, football and basketball coach, Economics teacher.
- Dennis Scannell, football coach, (1975 - 1993)
