= Ohio's 13th senatorial district =

American legislative district

Ohio's 13th State Senate district
Senator
| Vacant |
- Demographics: 77.5% White; 9.3% Black; 10.1% Hispanic; 1.6% Asian; 2.2% Native American; 0.1% Hawaiian/Pacific Islander
- Population (2020) • Voting age • Citizens of voting age: 364,245; 284,483; 276,131

Ohio's 13th senatorial district is now made up of Lorain and Huron counties (except the northern corners of Huron County. It is made up of House Districts 52, 53 and 54. The current Ohio Senator is Republican Nathan Manning and will be succeeded by Republican member-elect Gayle L. Manning in January 2027.

== Results of the 2026 election ==
Gayle, Manning (R) 73,773 51%

Joe Miller (D) 71,639 49%

Manning received about 5,900 more votes in Huron County and Miler led in Loraine County by more then 3,800 votes.

== Historically ==
Before the 2023 redistricting, the district was based in metropolitan Lorain, Ohio and consisted of all of the counties of Huron and Lorain. It encompassed Ohio House districts 55, 56 and 57. It has a Cook PVI of R+5.

== List of senators ==
| Senator | Party | Term | Notes |
|---|---|---|---|
| Harry Jump | Republican | January 3, 1967 – January 31, 1969 | Jump resigned after being named Ohio Director of Insurance. |
| Robert J. Corts | Republican | January 31, 1969 – December 31, 1974 | Corts lost re-election in 1974 to Don Pease. |
| Don Pease | Democrat | January 3, 1975 – January 3, 1977 | Pease won election to the United States Congress in 1976. |
| Ronald Nabowski | Democrat | January 3, 1977 – December 31, 1982 | Nabowski did not seek re-election in 1982. |
| Alan Zaleski | Democrat | January 3, 1983 – December 31, 1998 | Zaleski did not seek re-election in 1998. |
| Jeff Armbruster | Republican | January 5, 1999 – December 31, 2006 | Armbruster was term-limited in 2006. |
| Sue Morano | Democrat | January 3, 2007 – December 31, 2010 | Morano lost re-election to Gayle Manning in 2010. |
| Gayle Manning | Republican | January 3, 2011 – December 31, 2018 | Manning was term-limited in 2018. |
| Nathan Manning | Republican | January 3, 2019 – present | Incumbent |
