= List of Geneva Golden Tornadoes head football coaches =

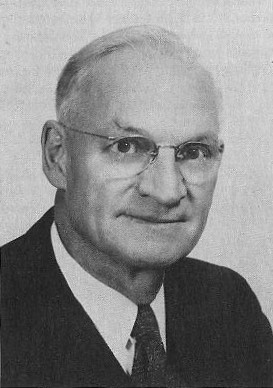
Head coach Robert Park simultaneously served as head football coach, professor, and local minister.

The Geneva Golden Tornadoes football program is a college football team that represents Geneva College in the Presidents' Athletic Conference, a part of the NCAA Division III. The team has had 29 head coaches since its first recorded football game in 1890.

Among the coaches in the history at Geneva College include College Football Hall of Fame members Bo McMillin and Cal Hubbard.

The current coach is Geno DeMarco who first took the position for the 1993 season. He leads the list with the most games coached and the most total wins. Samuel G. Craig has the highest winning percentage of the coaches at .859, accumulated from 1900 through the 1903 seasons and a total of 32 games. Arthur McKean managed the most tie games with 7.

== Key ==
Key to symbols in coaches list
General		Overall		Conference		Postseason (Note: Although the first Rose Bowl Game was played in 1902, it has been continuously played since the 1916 game, and is recognized as the oldest bowl game by the NCAA. "—" indicates any season prior to 1916 when postseason games were not played.)	
No.	Order of coaches (Note: A running total of the number of head coaches, with coaches who served separate tenures being counted only once. Interim head coaches are represented with "Int" and are not counted in the running total. "—" indicates the team played but either without a coach or no coach is on record. "X" indicates an interim year without play.)	GC	Games coached	CW	Conference wins	PW	Postseason wins
DC	Division championships	OW	Overall wins	CL	Conference losses	PL	Postseason losses
CC	Conference championships	OL	Overall losses	CT	Conference ties	PT	Postseason ties
NC	National championships	OT	Overall ties (Note: Overtime rules in college football were introduced in 1996, making ties impossible in the period since.)	C%	Conference winning percentage		
†	Elected to the College Football Hall of Fame	O%	Overall winning percentage (Note: When computing the win–loss percentage, a tie counts as half a win and half a loss.)				

== Coaches ==
No.	Name	Term	GC	OW	OL	OT	O%	CW	CL	CT	C%	PW	PL	CCs	Awards
1	William McCracken	1890–1896	36	17	18	1	.486	—	—	—	—	—	—	—	—
2	Ross Fiscus	1897–1899	17	6	9	2	.412	—	—	—	—	—	—	—	—
3	Samuel G. Craig	1900–1903	32	26	3	3	.859	—	—	—	—	—	—	—	—
4	Smith Alford	1904	7	1	4	2	.286	—	—	—	—	—	—	—	—
5	Archibald Leech	1905	9	4	5	0	.444	—	—	—	—	—	—	—	—
6	Arthur McKean	1907–1911	41	10	24	7	.329	—	—	—	—	—	—	—	—
7	Graydon Long	1912	7	3	4	0	.429	—	—	—	—	—	—	—	—
8	C. Brainerd Metheny	1913–1916	32	16	14	2	.531	—	—	—	—	—	—	—	—
9	Philip Henry Bridenbaugh	1917–1921	40	23	12	5	.638	—	—	—	—	—	—	—	—
10	Robert Park	1922	10	4	6	0	.400	—	—	—	—	—	—	—	—
11	Tom Davies	1923	9	6	2	1	.722	—	—	—	—	—	—	—	—
12	Jack Sack	1924	9	3	4	2	.444	—	—	—	—	—	—	—	—
13	Bo McMillin^{†}	1925–1927	29	22	6	1	.776	—	—	—	—	—	—	—	—
14	Mack Flenniken	1928–1929	19	7	11	1	.395	—	—	—	—	—	—	—	—
15	Howard Harpster	1930–1932	30	22	6	2	.767	—	—	—	—	—	—	—	—
16	Jimmy Robertson	1933	9	6	3	0	.667	—	—	—	—	—	—	—	—
17	Dwight V. Beede	1934–1936	26	14	9	3	.596	—	—	—	—	—	—	—	—
18	Edgar P. Weltner	1937–1940	37	16	19	2	.459	—	—	—	—	—	—	—	—
19	Alured C. Ransom	1941–1948	34	20	12	2	.618	—	—	—	—	—	—	—	—
20	Cal Hubbard^{†}	1942	9	6	3	0	.667	—	—	—	—	—	—	—	—
21	Walter J. West	1949–1952	34	18	14	2	.559	—	—	—	—	—	—	—	—
22	Byron E. Morgan	1953–1962	87	46	35	6	.563	—	—	—	—	—	—	—	—
23	Donald Lederick	1963–1966	32	5	26	1	.172	—	—	—	—	—	—	—	—
24	Joe Banks	1967–1968	16	1	14	1	.094	—	—	—	—	—	—	—	—
25	Dan Frasier	1969–1971	26	9	16	1	.365	—	—	—	—	—	—	—	—
26	Max Holm	1972–1973	18	12	6	0	.667	—	—	—	—	—	—	—	—
27	Dick Lasse	1974–1975	18	1	17	0	.056	—	—	—	—	—	—	—	—
28	Gene Sullivan	1976–1992	160	76	82	2	.481	—	—	—	—	—	—	—	—
29	Geno DeMarco	1993–2025	336	173	163	0	.515	—	—	—	—	—	—	—	—
30	Tom Contenta	2026–present	0	0	0	0	–	—	—	—	—	—	—	—	—

== Details ==
The following are details on coaches that do not have articles. For coaches with articles on Wikipedia, see links in the table above.

=== Archibald Leech ===
Dr. Archibald W. Leech played football, basketball, and baseball at Geneva College. He was known for his athletic skills and was named "one of the most noted athletes ever graduated" from the school. The school suffered one of its largest defeats to Penn State by a score of 73 to 0. This game was also Penn State's ninth largest all-time margin of victory and total points scored.

Leech only coached football for one year at Geneva, but stayed on as a full professor at the college. Leech gained prominence as an educator and businessman in the area of Cambria County, Pennsylvania, where he also served as postmaster.

=== Graydon Long ===
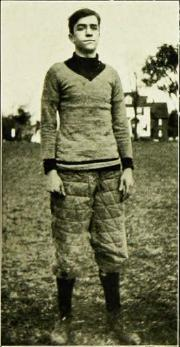
Graydon Long, 1906

Graydon Long (March 11, 1889-September 1966) was a professional football officials in the early days of the sport, officiating games of teams that would later make up the National Football League.

Long played high school football at West high School in Rochester, New York, as a member of the class of 1908. The 1906 team concluded an undefeated season and the 1907 team produced solid results as well.

After coaching in the college ranks, Long worked as an official for professional football at the time, primarily working games for the future NFL team Rochester Jeffersons.

=== Joe Banks ===
Coach Joe Banks

Joseph Banks (September 8, 1919 – June 19, 2007) was a long-time college athletics figure in Ohio and Pennsylvania. He worked as a head coach for American football and track & field.

Banks was the 24th head coach at Geneva for two seasons, from 1967 until 1968. His one victory came in the last game of the 1967 season against Bridgewater College by a score of 30 to 13.

==== Ohio Northern ====
Prior to taking the position at Geneva, he was the head track coach and assistant football coach at Ohio Northern University in Ada, Ohio, from 1960 until 1967. where he completed a "turnaround season" in 1962. After coaching at Geneva and a brief stint at a high school, he would return to Ohio Northern in 1971 for the remainder of his career, where he retired in 2002 as an admissions counselor. He has been credited with recruiting more students than any other person to Ohio Northern.

While at Ohio Northern, Banks would regularly hold training sessions for high school athletic administrators on how to run and promote track and field meets as well as how to coach individual events.

Ohio Northern honored his contribution to the university by naming their home track meet the "Joe Banks Invitational."

==== Military service ====
Banks served in the United States military during World War II as a Sergeant with the Third Army's 965th Ordnance Heavy Automotive Maintenance company in the Rhineland (Battle of the Bulge) and the Asiatic-Pacific Theatre in the Philippines.

==== Personal life ====
Banks earned a Bachelor of Science in education and later a Bachelor of Arts from Ohio Northern University. He later completed a Master of Education from Kent State University. He graduated from high school at New Philadelphia in 1937 where he was coached at track & field by Woody Hayes.

=== Dan Frasier ===
Daniel M. Frasier was named NAIA District 18 Coach of the Year in 1971. Frasier engineered a turnaround of the program, when the football team went to what was considered a "laughing stock of the district" to an 8-0 start in 1971 (some records show a 7-0 start and losing the last two games).

Before being head football coach at Geneva, he was assistant football coach at Geneva under Donald Lederick while simultaneously acting as the head baseball coach. He also played minor league baseball for the Houston Astros farm team.

Upon retirement from college coaching, he entered the private sector and took a career in banking.
