= Joe Crawford (baseball) =

American baseball player (born 1970)

- Pitcher
- Born: May 2, 1970 (age 55); Gainesville, Florida
- Batted: Left Threw: Left

Professional debut
- MLB: April 7, 1997, for the New York Mets
- NPB: April 5, 1998, for the Chiba Lotte Marines

Last appearance
- MLB: September 27, 1997, for the New York Mets
- NPB: May 17, 1999, for the Chiba Lotte Marines

MLB statistics
- Win–loss record: 4–3
- Earned run average: 3.30
- Strikeouts: 25

NPB statistics
- Win–loss record: 5–7
- Earned run average: 5.06
- Strikeouts: 42
- Stats at Baseball Reference

Teams
- New York Mets (1997); Chiba Lotte Marines (1998–1999)

Joseph Randall Crawford (born May 2, 1970) is an American former Major League Baseball pitcher who played for the New York Mets in 1997. Notably, Crawford made his major league debut as a pinch hitter in the top of the 15th inning in a game against the Los Angeles Dodgers before stepping on the mound in the bottom of the frame.

He formerly worked as a coaching assistant for the Milwaukee Brewers. Now he serves as a high school Vice Principal and Athletic Director of Willard High School in Willard, Ohio.
