= Sean Swarner =

Sean Swarner (born September 2, 1974) is an American motivational speaker and author, and a two-time child cancer survivor who was the recipient of the "Don't Ever Give Up" Award presented by the Jimmy V Foundation and ESPN in 2007.

== Early life and cancer survival ==
Swarner was born on September 2, 1974, in Ohio.

First diagnosed at age 13 with Hodgkin's Disease, and then later with Askin's sarcoma, Swarner was given two weeks to live in 1990, and is believed to be the only person in the world to have been diagnosed with both these cancers. He survived, although he has only one fully functioning lung due to the removal of a golf ball-sized tumor found with the Askin's diagnoses. Swarner told ESPN Radio's Bob Valvano that he would have been more likely to win the lottery four or five times than to have survived both these cancers.

== Later life ==
Swarner graduated from Willard High School in Willard, Ohio, in 1993, and Westminster College in 1997.

On May 16, 2002, he summited Mount Everest.

Swarner was featured on ESPN (July 27, 2007) with a 10-minute segment on his life story and struggles. He established a foundation, the Cancer Climber Association, which promotes cancer awareness and raises money for cancer research. He also wrote a book, Keep Climbing, which recounts the story of his life from his near death experience to his mountain climbing achievements 17 years later.

On October 11, 2008, Swarner completed the Ironman World Championship in Kailua-Kona, Hawaii, with a final time of 11:44:15.

== See also ==
- List of Mount Everest records
