= 2009 Victory Bowl =

Geneva Golden Tornadoes	Greenville Panthers
(7–3)	(7–2)
29	28
Head coach: Geno DeMarco	Head coach: Eric Hehman
	1	2	3	4	Total
Geneva	0	7	13	9	29
Greenville	7	6	15	0	28
- Date: November 21, 2009
- Season: 2009
- Stadium: Francis Field
- Location: Greenville, Illinois
- MVP: Offensive: Gerard Muchette (Geneva College) Defensive : Garrett Young (Greenville College)
- Attendance: 800

The 2009 Victory Bowl was a college football post-season bowl game. The game was played on November 21, 2009 at Francis Field in Greenville, Illinois. The Geneva College Golden Tornadoes, a provisional member of NCAA D-III Presidents' Athletic Conference played against the Greenville College of NCAA D-III Upper Mid-West Athletic Conference.

Geneva College won their fifth Victory Bowl in its sixth appearance (both NCCAA Victory Bowl records).

== Game summary ==
Geneva claimed a hard-fought victory over Greenville 29-28, with the issue being decided in the game's final seconds. Greenville took an early lead on a 1-yard touchdown run by Ambers. Gerard Muschette put Geneva on the board with a 5-yard touchdown run during the second quarter to tie the game at 7-7. The Panthers extended their lead on a 39-yard touchdown run by Ambers. The failed extra point gave Greenville a 13-7 lead going into the half.

Ambers scored his third of three touchdowns for Greenville with a 14-yard run. Friedrich caught a two-point conversion attempt from Lira to extend Greenville's lead over Geneva to 21-7. The Golden Tornadoes answered back with Muschette's second touchdown run. The 1 yard run and the extra point cut the Panthers' lead to 21-14. Greenville's final points of the game came in the third quarter when Fred scored on a pass of 33 yards from Lira. Ackerman's extra point put the score at 28-14 Greenville. Offensive MVP Gerard Muschette scored his third touchdown of the day late in the 3rd quarter on a five-yard run, but a failed extra point resulted in a scored of 28-20. Senior Matt Barge scored for the Golden Tornadoes with 4:54 left in the 4th quarter to cut the Panthers' lead over the Golden Tornadoes to 28-26. A failed two-point conversion attempt by the Golden Tornadoes left Greenville ahead. A successful stand by the Golden Tornado Defense, led by Brian Wilson, gave the ball back to Geneva with 2:12 remaining.

=== The Drive ===
The Golden Tornadoes' final possession of the 2009 season began on their own 3 yard line, with 2:12 remaining in the game. Junior quarterback David Girardi completed a first down pass to Barge for a ten-yard gain. Three incomplete passes resulted in a 4th and 10 for Geneva from their own 13 yard line. Heavy pass rush caused Girardi to scramble from the pocket who then completed a pass to Barge for a gain of 10 and a first down. Another pass to Barge, this time for 14 yards moved the ball out to Geneva's 37 yard line. A short gain on a pass by Girardi to Thurston moved the ball out to Geneva's 41 yard line. The Golden Tornadoes then relied "900 Saint Vincent" for a 47-yard gain down to Greenville's 12 yard line. The play called for Girardi to take a few steps towards Geneva's bench, asking for a new play. The ball was then directly snapped to running back Matt Barge who then lateralled the ball back to Girardi. Girardi then completed a deep post to Nuetzel for a huge gain. Geneva gained 8 more yards on two short passes to Dean and Thurston. A final incomplete pass led to a 4-2 at Greenville's 3 yard line when Nick Dipietro kicked the game-winning field goal with :19 seconds left in the game.

== Scoring Summary ==
=== Scoring summary ===
Plays	Yards	Scoring Play	Time	Score
1st quarter
10	54	GC - Ambers, 1-yard run (Ackerman kick)	4:30	Gen 0 - GC 7
2nd quarter
6	54	Gen - Muschette, 5-yard run (Dipietro kick)	2:34	Gen 7 - GC 7
6	43	GC - Ambers, 39-yard run (Ackerman kick failed)	0:45	Gen 7 - GC 13
3rd quarter
4	71	GC - Ambers, 14-yard run (Friedrich pass from Lira)	1:37	Gen 7 - GC 21
8	60	Gen - Muschette, 1-yard run (Dipietro kick)	2:42	Gen 14 - GC 21
4	37	GC - Fred, 33-yard pass from Lira (Ackerman kick)	1:57	Gen 14 - GC 28
4	65	Gen - Muschette, 5-yard run (Dipietro kick failed)	0:54	Gen 20 - GC 28
4th quarter
5	34	Gen - Barge, 7-yard run (two-point conversion failed)	2:09	Gen 26 - GC 28
12	94	Gen - Dipietro, 20-yard field goal	1:53	Gen 29 - GC 28

== Statistics ==
Statistical comparison
	Gen	GC
1st downs	21	16
Total yards	358	331
Passing yards	248	92
Rushing yards	110	239
Penalties	4-28	4-30
3rd down conversions	2-12	5-16
4th down conversions	2-3	2-5
Turnovers	1	1
Time of possession	27:29	32:31

=== Geneva College ===
- QB David Girardi: 19/35, 248 yds, Int
- RB Gerard Muschette: 20 rush, 113 yds, 3 TD
- WR Sam Thurston: 7 rec, 41 yds
- FB Matt Dean: 4 rec, 52 yds
- RB Matt Barge: 4 rec, 48 yds

=== Greenville College ===
- QB Lira: 3/9, 92 yds, TD
- RB Ambers: 26 rush, 126 yds, 3 TD
- WR Fred: 1 rec, 39 yds, TD
