= Senator Morano =

Senator Morano may refer to:

- Michael L. Morano (1915–2000), Connecticut State Senate
- Sue Morano (born 1960), Ohio State Senate

== See also ==
- Bernie Moreno (born 1967), U.S. Senator from Ohio
