= 2009 Geneva Golden Tornadoes football team =

American college football season

2009 Geneva Golden Tornadoes football

NCCAA champion

Victory Bowl, W 29–28 vs. Greenville
- Conference: Presidents' Athletic Conference
- Record: 8–3 (0–0 PAC)
- Head coach: Geno DeMarco (17th season)
- Offensive coordinator: Geno DeMarco
- Defensive coordinator: Mike Pinchotti
- Home stadium: Reeves Field

2009 Presidents' Athletic Conference football standings
| | Conf. | | | Overall |
| Team | W | | L | W | | L |
|---|---|---|---|---|---|---|
| No. 14 Thomas More $^ | 6 | – | 0 | 11 | – | 1 |
| Washington & Jefferson ^ | 5 | – | 1 | 9 | – | 2 |
| Grove City | 4 | – | 2 | 5 | – | 5 |
| Waynesburg | 2 | – | 4 | 5 | – | 5 |
| Westminster (PA) | 2 | – | 4 | 4 | – | 6 |
| Bethany (WV) | 1 | – | 5 | 3 | – | 7 |
| Thiel | 1 | – | 5 | 3 | – | 7 |
| Geneva # | | – | | 8 | – | 3 |
| Saint Vincent # | | – | | 0 | – | 10 |
$ – Conference champion; ^ – NCAA Division III playoff participant; # – Provisional NCAA Divisional III member; games not counted in standings; Rankings from D3football.com

The 2009 Geneva Golden Tornadoes football team represented Geneva College in the 2009 NCAA Division III football season and finished as NCCAA champions. The Golden Tornadoes played their home games at Reeves Field.

The season began with a non-conference game against Frostburg State, followed by a non-conference game against conference opponent and fellow provisional NCAA Division III member Saint Vincent. Following eight conference games in the Presidents' Athletic Conference, the Golden Tornadoes played Greenville in the 2009 Victory Bowl.

== Schedule ==
| Date | Time | Opponent | Site | Result | Attendance |
|---|---|---|---|---|---|
| September 5 | 7:00 pm | Frostburg State* | Reeves Field; Beaver Falls, PA | W 41–28 | 6,245 |
| September 12 | 2:00 pm | at Saint Vincent* | Chuck Noll Field; Latrobe, PA | W 32–17 | 1,558 |
| September 26 | 7:00 pm | Thiel | Reeves Field; Beaver Falls, PA | W 37–13 | 3,245 |
| October 3 | 2:00 pm | at Washington & Jefferson | Cameron Stadium; Washington, PA | L 10–31 | 3,445 |
| October 10 | 4:00 pm | Grove City^{†} | Reeves Field; Beaver Falls, PA | W 34–17 | 6,625 |
| October 17 | 1:30 pm | at Waynesburg | Wiley Stadium; Waynesburg, PA | W 49–39 | 1,200 |
| October 24 | 7:00 pm | Saint Vincent | Reeves Field; Beaver Falls, PA | W 38–20 | 3,240 |
| October 31 | 1:00 pm | Bethany (WV) | Reeves Field; Beaver Falls, PA | W 54–21 | 2,340 |
| November 7 | 2:00 pm | at No. 10 Thomas More | The Bank of Kentucky Field; Crestview Hills, KY | L 12–21 | 3,056 |
| November 14 | 1:30 pm | at Westminster (PA) | Harold Burry Stadium; New Wilmington, PA | L 28–31 | 2,104 |
| November 21 | | at Greenville* | Francis Field; Greenville, IL (Victory Bowl) | W 29–28 | 800 |
*Non-conference game; ^{†}Homecoming; Rankings from NCAA Poll released prior to the game; All times are in Eastern time

== Coaching staff ==
=== Head coach ===
The head coach was Geno DeMarco, who was in his 17th season at the helm of the Golden Tornadoes. DeMarco also worked as the offensive coordinator for the team.

=== Assistant coaches ===
Assistant coaches for the team were:

- Defensive Coordinator- Mike Pinchotti
- Offensive Line - Jason Wargo
- Defensive Backs - Tom Contena
- Tight Ends/Inside Receivers - Barry Emge
- Wide Receivers - Keith Humphries
- Quarterbacks - Don Costa
- Running Backs - Luke Travelpiece
- Outside Linebackers - Jeff Stephens
- Defensive Line - Mike Wickline
