= Archibald Leach (disambiguation) =

Archibald Leach is the birth name of film actor Cary Grant (1904–1986).

Archibald Leach may also refer to:

- Archie Leach, a fictional character played by John Cleese in the film A Fish Called Wanda
- Archie Leach, a fictional character played by Richard Chamberlain in the TV series Leverage

== See also ==
- Archibald Leech (American football), a Geneva Golden Tornadoes head football coach in 1905
- Archibald Leitch (1865–1939), Scottish architect
