= 2002 Victory Bowl =

Geneva Golden Tornadoes	Northwestern Eagles
(6–5)	(8–1)
19	9
Head coach: Geno DeMarco	Head coach: Kirk Talley
	1	2	3	4	Total
Geneva	12	7	0	0	19
Northwestern	0	9	0	0	9
- Date: November 22, 2002
- Season: 2002
- Stadium: Hubert H. Humphrey Metrodome
- Location: Minneapolis, Minnesota
- MVP: Kelly Lennox (Geneva College)

The 2002 Victory Bowl, the sixth edition of the annual game, was a college football bowl game played on Saturday, November 22, 2002, at the Hubert H. Humphrey Metrodome in Minneapolis, Minnesota. It featured the Geneva Golden Tornadoes against the Northwestern Eagles. The Golden Tornadoes won their third Victory Bowl by a 19–9. They held a 19-0 lead and never went back holding Northwestern to a scoreless second half. It is the largest stadium to have hosted a Victory Bowl Game and would do so again in 2008.

== Scoring summary ==
Scoring summary

Quarter	Time	Drive			Team	Scoring information	Score	
Quarter	Time	Plays	Yards	TOP	Team	Scoring information	Geneva Golden Tornadoes	Northwestern Eagles
1	12:24	4	62	1:25	Geneva Golden Tornadoes	Marko Thomas 6-yard touchdown reception from Ben Swallow, Zach Blair kick Blocked	6	0
1	9:48	1	54		Geneva Golden Tornadoes	Interception returned 54 yards for touchdown by Mike Schlereth, 2-point Ben Swallow Pass Failed	12	0
2	13:16	5	76	1:50	Geneva Golden Tornadoes	Josh Mullen 46-yard touchdown run, Zach Blair kick Good	19	0
2	7:28	4	54	2:05	Northwestern Eagles	Troy Naki 36-yard touchdown reception from Justin Daggett, Steve Gibbs kick Failed	19	6
2	0:56	8	32	3:35	Northwestern Eagles	26-yard field goal by Steve Gibbs	19	9
"TOP" = time of possession. For other American football terms, see Glossary of American football.							Geneva Golden Tornadoes	Northwestern Eagles
