= Red Davis (American football) =

American football player (1907–1988)

Profile
- Position: Tailback

Personal information
- Born: November 14, 1907; Franks, Ohio, U.S.
- Died: August 5, 1988 (aged 80); Garden Grove, California, U.S.
- Listed height: 5 ft 11 in (1.80 m)
- Listed weight: 195 lb (88 kg)

Career information
- High school: Willard (Willard, Ohio)
- College: Geneva (1927–1930)

Career history
- Portsmouth Spartans (1933); Philadelphia Eagles (1933)
- Stats at Pro Football Reference

Sylvester Edward "Red" Davis (November 14, 1907 – August 5, 1988) was an American professional football tailback who played one season in the National Football League (NFL) with the Portsmouth Spartans and Philadelphia Eagles. He played college football at Geneva College.

== Early life and college ==
Sylvester Edward Davis was born on November 14, 1907, in Franks, Ohio. He attended Willard High School in Willard, Ohio.

Davis played college football for the Geneva Golden Tornadoes of Geneva College from 1927 to 1930.

== Professional career ==
Davis played in one game for the Portsmouth Spartans of the National Football League (NFL) during the 1933 season.

Davis signed with the Philadelphia Eagles of the NFL in 1933. He played in seven games, all starts, for the Eagles that year, totaling 15 carries for 57 yards and one touchdown, four catches for 50 yards, two completions on six passing attempts for 62 yards, one touchdown, and three interceptions, and three extra points. The Eagles finished the season with a 3–5–1 record. He became a free agent after the season.

== Personal life ==
Davis died on August 5, 1988, in Garden Grove, California.
