= Senator Armbruster =

Senator Armbruster may refer to:

- Christian H. Armbruster (1921–1986), New York State Senate
- Jeff Armbruster (1947–2026), Ohio State Senate

== See also ==
- Ken Armbrister (born 1946), Texas State Senate
