= 2003 Victory Bowl =

North Greenville Crusaders	Geneva Golden Tornadoes
(6–4)	(6–4)
14	37
Head coach: Brian Smith	Head coach: Geno DeMarco
	1	2	3	4	Total
North Greenville	0	7	7	0	14
Geneva	10	0	20	7	37
- Date: November 21, 2003
- Season: 2003
- Stadium: Reeves Field
- Location: Beaver Falls, Pennsylvania
- MVP: Josh Mullen (Geneva College), Brandon Nathan (Geneva College)
- Attendance: 2,117

The 2003 Victory Bowl, the seventh edition of the annual game, was a college football bowl game played on Saturday, November 21, 2003, at Reeves Field in Beaver Falls, Pennsylvania. It featured the North Greenville Crusaders against the Geneva Golden Tornadoes. The Golden Tornadoes defended their title winning their fourth Victory Bowl in 6 years by a score of 37–14. At the time it was the most attended Victory Bowl but it would be broken in 2006 and 2010 by North Greenville. The Golden Tornadoes tore through the Crusaders defense gaining 564 yards to North Greenville's 431 including a whopping 404 rushing yards. Josh Mullen and Brandon Nathan were Co-MVPs rushing for a combined 353 of the 404 total rushing yards on 36 carries and 4 Touchdowns. It is the largest disparity of victory for the NAIA with Geneva College being an NAIA school winning against a Division II school in North Greenville.

== Scoring summary ==
Scoring summary

Quarter	Time	Drive			Team	Scoring information	Score	
Quarter	Time	Plays	Yards	TOP	Team	Scoring information	North Greenville Crusaders	Geneva Golden Tornadoes
1	10:30	9	44	3:01	Geneva Golden Tornadoes	37-yard field goal by Zach Blair	0	3
1	3:35	5	80	0:53	Geneva Golden Tornadoes	Brandon Nathan 26-yard touchdown run, Zach Blair kick Good	0	10
2	0:07	3	39	0:37	North Greenville Crusaders	James Crooks 33-yard touchdown reception from Bobby Pittman, Matt Reynolds kick Good	7	10
3	13:13	4	74	1:42	Geneva Golden Tornadoes	Brandon Nathan 39-yard touchdown run, Zach Blair kick Good	7	17
3	6:57	5	88	2:45	Geneva Golden Tornadoes	Brandon Nathan 62-yard touchdown run, Zach Blair kick Good	7	24
3	2:44	5	34	1:32	Geneva Golden Tornadoes	Josh Mullen 24-yard touchdown run, Zach Blair kick Failed	7	30
3	0:33	6	74	2:03	North Greenville Crusaders	Travis Mosley 8-yard touchdown run, Matt Reynolds kick Good	14	30
4	11:31	7	78	3:56	Geneva College Tornadoes	Matt Nowaczynski 55-yard touchdown reception from Justin Sciarro, Zach Blair kick Good	14	37
"TOP" = time of possession. For other American football terms, see Glossary of American football.							North Greenville Crusaders	Geneva Golden Tornadoes
