= Eric Hehman =

American football player and coach (born 1972)

Current position
- Title: Offensive coordinator
- Team: Cincinnati Hills Christian Academy (OH)

Biographical details
- Born: August 11, 1972 (age 54)

Playing career
- 1991–1994: Taylor

Coaching career (HC unless noted)
- 1995–1997: Taylor (DL)
- 1998: Taylor (OL)
- 1999–2003: Trinity International (assistant)
- 2004: Trinity International (AHC/OC/QB)
- 2005–2009: Greenville
- 2010–2015: Malone
- 2016–2022: Olivet Nazarene
- 2023–present: Cincinnati Hills Christian Academy (OH) (OC)

Head coaching record
- Overall: 83–104
- Bowls: 3–1
- Tournaments: 0–1 (NAIA playoffs)

Accomplishments and honors

Championships
- 1 UMAC South Division (2009); 1 MSFA Midwest (2022)

Eric Hehman (born August 11, 1972) is an American college football coach and former player. He is the offensive coordinator for Cincinnati Hills Christian Academy, a position he has held since 2023. He was the head football coach at Olivet Nazarene University from 2016 to 2022. Hehman served as the head football coach at Greenville College in Greenville, Illinois from 2005 to 2009 and at Malone University in Canton, Ohio from 2010 to 2015.

== Coaching career ==
=== Greenville ===
Hehman has as the head football coach at Greenville College in Greenville, Illinois, an NCAA Division III, school from 2005 to 2009. He led the Panthers to a 7–3 record in 2009 including a berth in the 2009 Victory Bowl (losing to Geneva College 29–28). This was the first postseason appearance for Greenville since 2000. The team also captured the Upper Midwest Athletic Conference South Division championship (3–0 record), which was the first Division III conference title for the program. In his five years at Greenville, his teams posted an overall record of 25–22.

=== Malone ===
On December 28, 2009, Hehman was named the new head coach of the Malone Pioneers football team. Hehman took over for four-year head coach Mike Gardner, who resigned recently to take the head coaching position at his former institution, Tabor College in Hillsboro, Kansas.

In his first season at Malone, his team finished 3–7 (2–5 in conference play).

== Head coaching record ==
Year	Team	Overall	Conference	Standing	Bowl/playoffs	NAIA^{#}
Greenville Panthers (St. Louis Intercollegiate Athletic Conference) (2005–2009)
2005	Greenville	4–6				
2006	Greenville	6–4				
2007	Greenville	5–5				
2008	Greenville	6–4	5–2	3rd		
Greenville Panthers (Upper Midwest Athletic Conference) (2009)
2009	Greenville	7–3	3–0	T–1st (South)	L Victory	
Greenville:		28–22				
Malone Pioneers (Mid-States Football Association) (2010–2011)
2010	Malone	3–7	2–5	6th (MEL)		
2011	Malone	4–7	0–0	N/A (MEL)		
Malone Pioneers (Great Lakes Intercollegiate Athletic Conference) (2012–2015)
2012	Malone	1–9	1–9	8th (South)		
2013	Malone	2–9	1–8	T–6th (South)		
2014	Malone	1–10	1–9	7th (South)		
2015	Malone	0–10	0–10	7th (South)		
Malone:		11–52	5–41			
Olivet Nazarene Tigers (Mid-States Football Association) (2016–2022)
2016	Olivet Nazarene	4–7	2–3	T–3rd (MWL)		
2017	Olivet Nazarene	6–5	2–3	T–3rd (MWL)		
2018	Olivet Nazarene	6–5	4–1	2nd (MWL)	W Victory	
2019	Olivet Nazarene	6–5	4–2	T–2nd (MWL)	W Victory	
2020–21	Olivet Nazarene	8–1	8–0	1st (MWL)	L NAIA First Round	9
2021	Olivet Nazarene	7–3	5–2	3rd (MWL)		
2022	Olivet Nazarene	7–4	5–2	3rd (MWL)	W Victory	
Olivet Nazarene:		44–30	30–13			
Total:		83–104				
National championship Conference title Conference division title or championship game berth
