= Gene Sullivan =

Gene Sullivan may refer to:

- E. J. Sullivan (politician) (1875–1956), American politician
- Gene Sullivan (basketball) (1931–2002), American basketball coach and collegiate athletic director
- Gene Sullivan (American football), American football coach
- Gene Sullivan (footballer) (1903–1969), Australian rules footballer
- Gene Sullivan (songwriter) (1914–1984), American songwriter
