= Weltner =

Weltner is a surname of Swiss German origin. Notable people with the surname include:

- Charles L. Weltner (1927–1992), American politician
- Edgar P. Weltner, American football and basketball player
- Peter Weltner, German organist and keyboardist
