= 1999 Victory Bowl =

Geneva Golden Tornadoes	MidAmerica Nazarene Pioneers
(7–3)	(7–3)
31	26
Head coach: Geno DeMarco	Head coach: Mike Redwine
	1	2	3	4	Total
Geneva	9	0	8	14	31
MidAmerica Nazarene	0	10	14	2	26
- Date: November 27, 1999
- Season: 1999
- Stadium: Fawcett Stadium
- Location: Canton, Ohio
- MVP: Melvin Cobbs (RB) (Geneva College)
- Attendance: 300

The 1999 Victory Bowl, the third edition of the annual game, was a college football bowl game played on Saturday, November 27, 1999, at Fawcett Stadium in Canton, Ohio. It featured the MidAmerica Nazarene Pioneers against the Geneva Golden Tornadoes. The Tornadoes won 31–26.

== Scoring summary ==
Scoring summary

Quarter	Time	Drive			Team	Scoring information	Score	
Quarter	Time	Plays	Yards	TOP	Team	Scoring information	Geneva Golden Tornadoes	MidAmerica Nazarene Pioneers
1	10:41				Geneva Golden Tornadoes	27-yard field goal by Jason Gill	3	0
1	5:06				Geneva Golden Tornadoes	Jason Candle 7-yard touchdown reception from Justin Myers, Jason Gill kick Blocked	9	0
2	10:19				MidAmerica Nazarene Pioneers	Jeremy Males 1-yard touchdown run, Jake Houchin kick Good	9	7
2	1:30				MidAmerica Nazarene Pioneers	24-yard field goal by Jake Houchin	9	10
3	8:58				Geneva Golden Tornadoes	Melvin Cobbs 4-yard touchdown run, 2-point Melvin Cobbs Run Good	17	10
3	5:56				MidAmerica Nazarene Pioneers	Jay Allen 5-yard touchdown run, Jake Houchin kick Good	17	17
3	0:16				MidAmerica Nazarene Pioneers	Jeremy Males 9-yard touchdown run, Jake Houchin kick Good	17	24
4	15:00				Geneva Golden Tornadoes	Rueben Jackson 20-yard touchdown run, Jason Gill kick Good	24	24
4	14:28				Geneva Golden Tornadoes	Melvin Cobbs 15-yard touchdown run, Jason Gill kick Good	31	24
4	2:15	-	-	-	MidAmerica Nazarene Pioneers	tackled in end zone for a safety by Team	31	26
"TOP" = time of possession. For other American football terms, see Glossary of American football.							Geneva Golden Tornadoes	MidAmerica Nazarene Pioneers
