= Nathan Manning =

American politician (born 1982)

Judge of the Ohio Court of Appeals for the 9th District
- Incumbent
- Assumed office August 3, 2026
- Appointed by: Mike DeWine
- Preceded by: Donna Carr

Member of the Ohio Senate from the 13th district
- In office January 3, 2019 – 2026
- Preceded by: Gayle Manning
- Succeeded by: Gayle Manning (elect)

Member of the Ohio House of Representatives from the 55th district
- In office January 3, 2015 – December 31, 2018
- Preceded by: Matt Lundy
- Succeeded by: Gayle Manning

Personal details
- Born: January 13, 1982 (age 44)
- Party: Republican
- Parent(s): Jeffrey Manning and Gayle Manning
- Education: Denison University (BA); Capital University Law School (JD)

Nathan Houck Manning (born January 13, 1982) is an American politician currently serving as a judge of the Ohio Court of Appeals for the 9th District. A Republican, he was appointed to the role by governor Mike DeWine in August 2026.

Manning is a former member of the Ohio Senate, representing the 13th district from 2019 to 2026, and the Ohio House of Representatives, representing the 55th district from 2015 to 2018. He is the son of current state representative and speaker pro tempore Gayle Manning as well as former state representative Jeffrey Manning.

== Career ==
Manning was an assistant prosecutor for the city of North Ridgeville before running for office. Manning is a graduate of Denison University and Capital University Law School.

In July 2026, Governor Mike DeWine appointed Manning to a seat on the Ninth District Court of Appeals.

== Elections ==
In 2014, Manning ran for the Ohio House of Representatives to succeed the term-limited Matt Lundy. In the general election, Manning defeated his opponent, Democrat Brendan Mackin, 56%-44% to take the seat.

In 2018, Manning ran for the Ohio Senate, defeating Democratic opponent, Sharon Sweda, 53%-44% to take the seat.

In 2022, Manning won reelection against Democratic challenger Anthony Eliopoulos, 58%-42%.

== Political Positions ==
Manning has been described as being a “moderate” politically, with positions such as phasing out the income tax in Ohio over the next decade, and opposition and a call for repeal to controversial "Ohio House Bill 6", which provided subsidies for two nuclear power plants in Ohio. This bill was part of the Ohio nuclear bribery scandal. Manning also voted against a bill that would ban gender-affirming care for minors and restrict transgender women from participating in women's sports, being the only Republican Ohio Senator to do so.

Manning describes himself as pro-life and only supporting exceptions for rape, incest, and when the life of the mother is in danger. However, In 2019, Manning voted against Ohio Senate Bill 23, commonly referred to as the "Heartbeat Bill." The legislation bans most abortions after the detection of a fetal heartbeat, which typically occurs around six weeks into pregnancy. The bill does not include exceptions for rape or incest and was signed into law by Governor Mike DeWine on April 11, 2019. Manning’s vote against SB 23 reflected his alignment with exceptions in abortion laws for rape, incest and danger to the life of the mother. The bill became one of the most high-profile and legally contested pieces of anti-abortion legislation in the state. In September 2022, a Hamilton County judge issued a temporary restraining order that blocked enforcement of the law, restoring abortion access in Ohio up to 22 weeks of pregnancy during ongoing legal proceedings.
