= Willard City School District =

School district in Ohio, United States

Address
- 123 West Whisler Drive Willard, Ohio, 44890; United States

District information
- Type: Public
- Grades: PreK–12
- NCES District ID: 3904509

Students and staff
- Students: 1,331 (2020–2021)
- Teachers: 91.0 (on an FTE basis)
- Staff: 242.13 (on an FTE basis)
- Student–teacher ratio: 14.63:1

Other information
- Website: www.willard.k12.oh.us

Willard City School District is a public school district serving students in the city of Willard, Ohio, United States. The school district enrolls 1,777 students as of the 2012–2013 academic year. The district has a new facility which houses all K-12 students all at the same location.

== Schools ==
=== Elementary schools ===
- Willard Elementary School (Pre-K-2nd)
- Central Elementary School (closed)
- Greenfield Elementary School (closed)
- New Haven Elementary School (closed)
- Richmond Elementary School (closed)

=== Middle schools ===
- Willard Intermediate School (3rd-6th)

=== High schools ===
- Willard Middle/High School (7th-12th)
