= Max Holm =

American football and basketball coach

Playing career

Football
- 1960–1961: Westminster (PA)
- Position: End

Coaching career (HC unless noted)

Football
- 1972–1973: Geneva

Basketball
- 1969–1971: Geneva (assistant)
- 1971–1972: Geneva

Head coaching record
- Overall: 12–6 (football); 6–18 (basketball)

Max Holm is an American former football and basketball player and coach. He is credited with building one of the strongest defensive teams for NAIA football during his day. He is one of the few "modern era" college coaches to have been both the head basketball coach and the head football coach at the same school in the same calendar year.

== Playing career ==
A native of Pittsburgh, Holm played as an end for Westminster College for the 1960 and 1961 seasons under Hall of Fame coach Harold Burry. Holm completed his high school football career at Peabody High School in Pittsburgh.

== Coaching career ==
=== Geneva basketball ===
Holm was the basketball coach at Geneva College in Beaver Falls, Pennsylvania, for the 1971–72 season, and then resigned to take the head football coach position at the same school. Prior to being head basketball coach, he was an assistant in the program for two seasons.

=== Geneva football ===
Holm became the 26th head football coach at Geneva and he held that position for two seasons, from 1972 to 1973, compiling a record of 12–6.

In his first year at Geneva, Holm led the team through an exciting season that began among concerns of relying heavily on sophomores and ended with a record of 8 wins and 1 loss, with the sole loss coming on the last and highly anticipated game of the season against Westminster College. The Golden Tornadoes were the nation's leading team against the rush while the Titans rushing attack was just average. Before the final game of 1972, Geneva's opponents could only average 48.3 yards per game on the ground.

While at Geneva, he coached future National Football League player Bruce Craft, who played offensive tackle for the Dallas Cowboys.

Holm resigned his position after the conclusion of the 1973 season.

== Head coaching record ==
=== Football ===
Year	Team	Overall	Conference	Standing	Bowl/playoffs
Geneva Golden Tornadoes (NAIA Division II independent) (1972–1973)
1972	Geneva	8–1			
1973	Geneva	4–5			
Geneva:		12–6			
Total:		12–6			
