= Charlie Frye =

American football player and coach (born 1981)

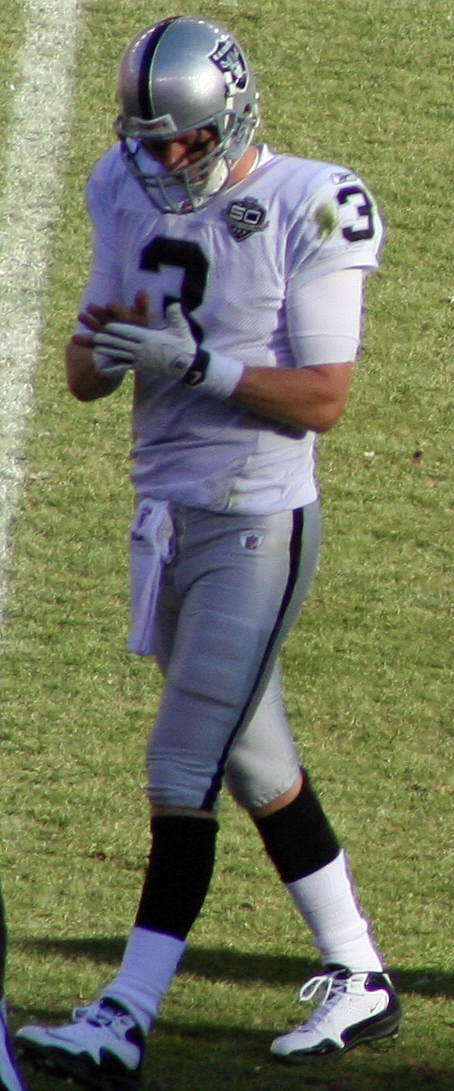
- Frye with the Oakland Raiders in 2009

Minnesota Vikings
- Title: Defensive assistant

Personal information
- Born: August 28, 1981 (age 45); Willard, Ohio, U.S.
- Listed height: 6 ft 4 in (1.93 m)
- Listed weight: 220 lb (100 kg)

Career information
- Position: Quarterback (No. 9, 5, 3)
- High school: Willard
- College: Akron (2000–2004)
- NFL draft: 2005: 3rd round, 67th overall pick

Career history

Playing
- Cleveland Browns (2005–2007); Seattle Seahawks (2007–2008); Oakland Raiders (2009–2010)

Coaching
- Jones HS (FL) (2012–2013) Offensive coordinator; Wekiva HS (FL) (2014–2015) Offensive coordinator; Florida (2016–2017) Director of player development; Ashland (2018) Wide receivers coach; Central Michigan (2019–2020) Offensive coordinator & quarterbacks coach; Miami Dolphins (2021) Quarterbacks coach; Penn State (2022) Offensive analyst & analytics coordinator; Florida Atlantic (2023–2024) Offensive coordinator; Minnesota Vikings (2025–present) Defensive assistant

Awards and highlights
- Vern Smith Leadership Award (2004); Second-team All-MAC (2004)

Career NFL statistics
- Passing attempts: 677
- Passing completions: 419
- Completion percentage: 61.9%
- TD–INT: 17–29
- Passing yards: 4,154
- Passer rating: 69.7
- Rushing yards: 347
- Rushing touchdowns: 4
- Stats at Pro Football Reference

Charles Thomas Frye (born August 28, 1981) is an American football coach and former player who serves as a defensive assistant for the Minnesota Vikings of the National Football League (NFL). He played professionally as a quarterback for six seasons in the NFL with the Cleveland Browns, Seattle Seahawks, and Oakland Raiders.

Frye played college football for the Akron Zips and was selected by the Cleveland Browns in the third round of the 2005 NFL draft.

== Early life ==
Frye graduated from Willard High School in Willard, Ohio, and was a football standout at quarterback under coach Chris Hawkins. He broke 17 of the school's all-time football records. In his senior season, Frye led the Crimson Flashes to a 10–2 record, earning the Northwest District Player of the Year award and First-team All-Ohio Division III team honors. Frye excelled in basketball; during his senior season he earned First-team All-Northwest District and Honorable Mention All-Ohio Honors and helped lead the Crimson Flashes to a 22–3 record, a Northern Ohio League Championship and a Sweet 16 berth.

== College career ==
Frye broke 54 football records during his college career at the University of Akron. After red-shirting in freshman year, Frye was named starting quarterback in just the second game of his freshman season. Frye won the MVP award at the 2005 Senior Bowl in Mobile, Alabama.

=== Statistics ===
Season				Passing							Rushing			Receiving		
Year	Team	GS	GP	Rating	Att	Comp	Pct	Yds	TD	INT	Att	Yds	TD	Rec	Yds	TD
2001	Akron	10	11	124.6	289	170	58.8	2,053	9	6	62	22	3	0	0	0
2002	Akron	12	12	136.5	380	250	**65.8**	2,824	15	9	102	125	7	1	-4	0
2003	Akron	11	12	148.6	421	273	64.8	**3,549**	22	9	111	288	7	1	14	0
2004	Akron	11	11	139.8	349	220	63.6	2,623	18	8	100	-6	2	0	0	0
	Totals	44	46	138.5	**1,436**	**913**	**63.6**	**11,049**	**64**	**32**	375	429	19	2	10	0

- Numbers in **Bold** are Akron school records

== Professional career ==
Pre-draft measurables
Height	Weight	Arm length	Hand span	40-yard dash	10-yard split	20-yard split	20-yard shuttle	Three-cone drill	Vertical jump	Broad jump	Wonderlic
6 ft 3 7/8 in (1.93 m)	225 lb (102 kg)	31 1/8 in (0.79 m)	8 7/8 in (0.23 m)	4.88 s	1.69 s	2.82 s	4.08 s	6.94 s	33 in (0.84 m)	9 ft 5 in (2.87 m)	38
All values from NFL Combine

=== Cleveland Browns ===
Frye was selected in the third round (67th overall) of the 2005 NFL draft by the Browns. His first NFL start came against the Jacksonville Jaguars in week 13. He passed for 226 yards with two touchdowns, both to fellow rookie Braylon Edwards, and set a Browns rookie record for a single game with a 136.7 passer rating. Frye started the final five games of the 2005 season for the Browns, compiling a record of 2–3.

Frye was named starting quarterback for the 2006 NFL season.

After a battle in the preseason with Derek Anderson and rookie Brady Quinn, Frye won the starting quarterback job for the 2007 season. In the first game against the Pittsburgh Steelers, Frye struggled during the first few minutes. Anderson replaced him for the remainder of the game. Anderson remained the starter for the rest of the year and made the Pro Bowl.

=== Seattle Seahawks ===
On September 11, Frye was traded to the Seattle Seahawks for a sixth-round draft pick. He was the Seahawks' third-string quarterback behind Matt Hasselbeck and Seneca Wallace. Frye made his first start of the 2008 season against the Green Bay Packers.

=== Oakland Raiders ===
An unrestricted free agent following the 2008 season, Frye signed with the Oakland Raiders on June 8, 2009.

On December 16, 2009, Raiders head coach Tom Cable named Frye the starting quarterback of the Oakland Raiders after Bruce Gradkowski was injured with two torn MCL's. Frye surpassed former starter and number one overall draft pick JaMarcus Russell after Russell was sacked six times in relief of Gradkowski the previous week in a game against the Washington Redskins.

On December 20, 2009, Frye made his first start against the Denver Broncos, but was injured early in the fourth quarter and JaMarcus Russell came in to win the game.

Frye came back from his injury to play the next two weeks against the Cleveland Browns and Baltimore Ravens. Frye threw 3 interceptions but came back against the Ravens to throw a touchdown and no interceptions. Frye finished the season with 581 yards passing, 1 TD, and 4 INT with a 65.3 passer rating.

Frye signed a 1-year, $1.2 million contract with a third-round tender on March 15, 2010. During training camp later that year, Frye injured his wrist and had to undergo surgery. Oakland placed him on injured reserve on August 19, 2010.

== Coaching career ==
After injuries and surgeries ended his career early, Frye turned to coaching. Former teammate Kenard Lang, who was by then the head football coach at Jones High School in Orlando, hired Frye as offensive coordinator.

Before the 2013 season, Lang and Frye were hired for the same positions at Wekiva High School in Apopka, Florida.

Frye spent the 2018 football season as the wide receivers coach for Ashland University (Ashland, OH)

In January 2019 it was announced that Frye would be joining the staff of new Central Michigan head coach Jim McElwain as the offensive coordinator and quarterbacks coach.

In January 2021, Frye was named as the QB Coach for the Miami Dolphins.

In August 2022, Frye joined the Penn State football Staff as an Offensive Analyst. In December of the same year, Frye agreed to become the next offensive coordinator at Florida Atlantic.

On March 18, 2025, the Minnesota Vikings hired Frye to serve as a defensive assistant.

== Personal life ==
In honor of his high school career, the Crimson Flashes retired his #3 jersey and is on display in the Commons and on the field.

In honor of his #5 jersey and last name, Akron Mayor Don Plusquellic declared Friday, November 5, 2004 "Frye-day".

== See also ==
- List of Division I FBS passing yardage leaders
