= SS Daniel Willard =

Liberty ship of WWII

History

United States
- Name: Daniel Willard
- Namesake: Daniel Willard
- Owner: War Shipping Administration (WSA)
- Operator: Calmar Steamship Corp.
- Ordered: as type (EC2-S-C1) hull, MCE hull 925
- Awarded: 30 January 1942
- Builder: Bethlehem-Fairfield Shipyard, Baltimore, Maryland
- Cost: $1,064,910
- Yard number: 2075
- Way number: 13
- Laid down: 26 October 1942
- Launched: 25 November 1942
- Sponsored by: Miss Mary Beale Willard
- Completed: 8 December 1942
- Identification: Call sign: KKAZ
- Fate: Laid up in Reserve Fleet, 15 October 1957, sold for scrap 23 December 1970

General characteristics
- Class & type: Liberty ship; type EC2-S-C1, standard
- Tonnage: 10,865 LT DWT; 7,176 GRT
- Displacement: 3,380 long tons (3,434 t) (light); 14,245 long tons (14,474 t) (max)
- Length: 441 feet 6 inches (135 m) oa; 416 feet (127 m) pp; 427 feet (130 m) lwl
- Beam: 57 feet (17 m)
- Draft: 27 ft 9.25 in (8.4646 m)
- Installed power: 2 × Oil fired 450 °F (232 °C) boilers, operating at 220 psi (1,500 kPa); 2,500 hp (1,900 kW)
- Propulsion: 1 × triple-expansion steam engine, (manufactured by Ellicott Machine Corp., Baltimore, Maryland); 1 × screw propeller
- Speed: 11.5 knots (21.3 km/h; 13.2 mph)
- Capacity: 562,608 cubic feet (15,931 m^{3}) (grain); 499,573 cubic feet (14,146 m^{3}) (bale)
- Complement: 38–62 USMM; 21–40 USNAG
- Armament: Varied by ship; Bow-mounted 3-inch (76 mm)/50-caliber gun; Stern-mounted 4-inch (102 mm)/50-caliber gun; 2–8 × single 20-millimeter (0.79 in) Oerlikon anti-aircraft (AA) cannons and/or, 2–8 × 37-millimeter (1.46 in) M1 AA guns

SS Daniel Willard was a Liberty ship built in the United States during World War II. She was named after Daniel Willard, an American railroad executive best known as the president of the Baltimore and Ohio Railroad (B&O) from 1910 to 1941.

== Construction ==
Daniel Willard was laid down on 26 October 1942, under a Maritime Commission (MARCOM) contract, MCE hull 925, by the Bethlehem-Fairfield Shipyard, Baltimore, Maryland; she was sponsored by Miss Mary Beale Willard, granddaughter of Daniel Willard, and was launched on 25 November 1942.

== History ==
She was allocated to Calmar Steamship Corp., on 8 December 1942.

On 24 November 1945, she was laid up in the Suisun Bay Reserve Fleet. On 17 November 1947, she was approved for sale to Compania Panamena de Navegacion Santa Anna, SA, in Panama. On 3 June 1948, Daniel Willard was transferred to Savannah, Georgia, before being transferred to the Wilmington Reserve Fleet at Wilmington, North Carolina, on 17 June 1948. This second transfer was prompted by the sale of the ship being declared "null and void" because MARCOM had not received payment within six months. On 29 October 1957, she was transferred to the Hudson River Reserve Fleet, in Hoboken, New Jersey. On 23 December 1970, she was sold to Dawood Corporation Ltd., of Pakistan, and moved 20 May 1971, to Spain for scrapping.

== Bibliography ==
- "Bethlehem-Fairfield, Baltimore MD". www.ShipbuildingHistory.com. 7 August 2021.
- Maritime Administration. "Daniel Willard". Ship History Database Vessel Status Card. U.S. Department of Transportation, Maritime Administration.
- Davies, James (May 2004). "Specifications (As-Built)" (PDF). p. 23.
- "SS Daniel Willard".
