= Pioneer Career and Technology Center =

Vocational school in Shelby, Ohio

Coordinates: 40°54′11″N 82°40′11″W

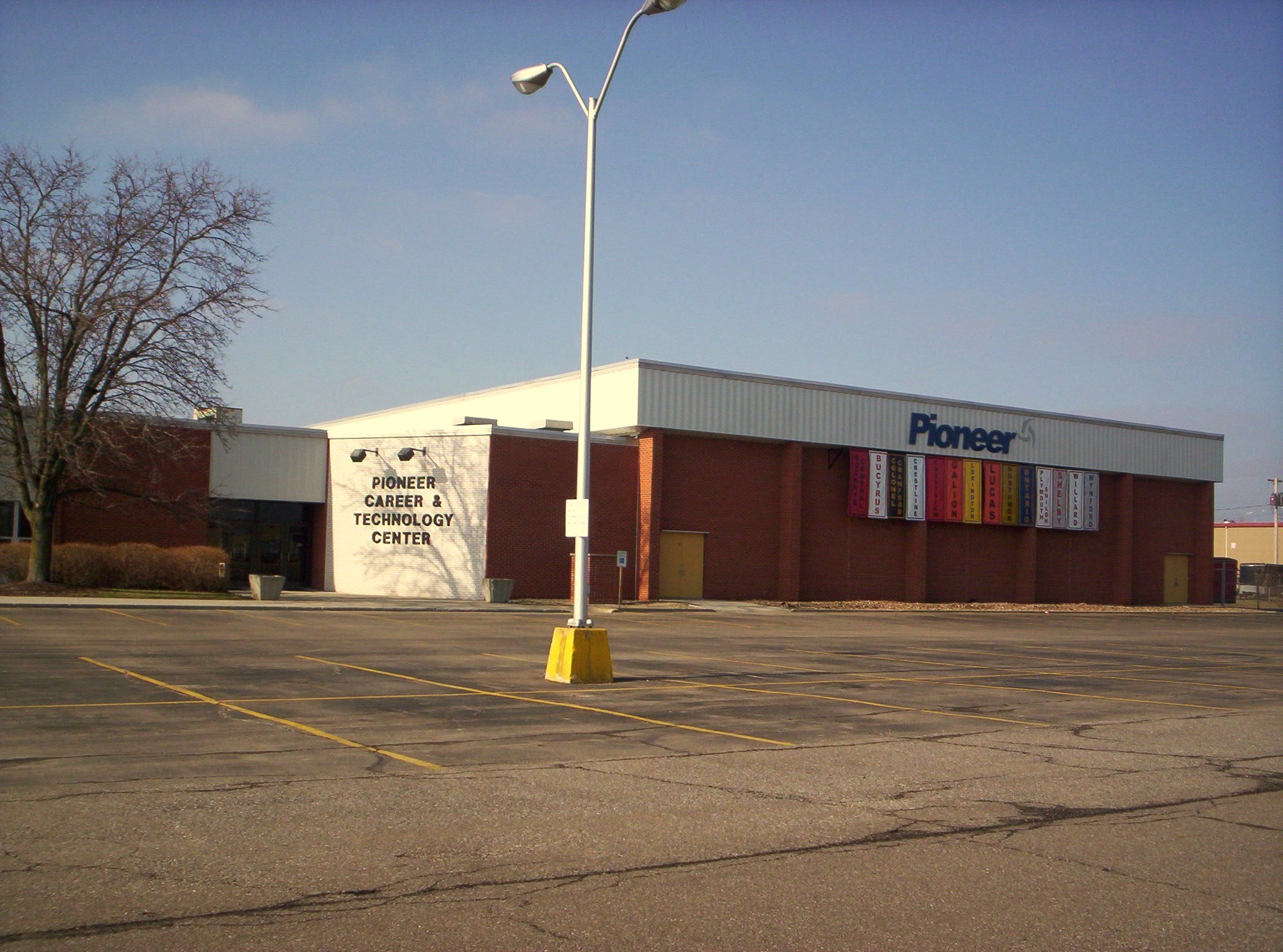
Pioneer Career and Technology Center in Shelby, Ohio

Pioneer Career and Technology Center is a public vocational school in Shelby, Ohio. It is Ohio's 5th largest vocational school. It serves the area around the counties of Richland and Crawford. Its classes are open to juniors and seniors in local high schools.

== High school ==
Students from partner schools around the area are allowed to come to PCTC starting their Junior year of high school as long as they reach the curriculum requirements to enter after completion of their sophomore year. Once entered, students have the choice of choosing a lab which they will be in for around two and a half hours daily. These labs have certain requirements to gain grades depending upon the nature of the lab and also feature certain attire based upon the job skills which students will be learning.

Such labs consist of a wide variety of job choices which range from Agricultural related areas to fields related to Transportation. The range of lab choices will help students after graduating have the ability to enter the workforce immediately with the acquired skills which they have learned. Since skills are learned, lab instructors require students to treat the class as a working environment as students will depending upon their lab do work for clients and customers.

== Partner schools ==
Enrollment is open to students from any of PCTC's fourteen partner schools.

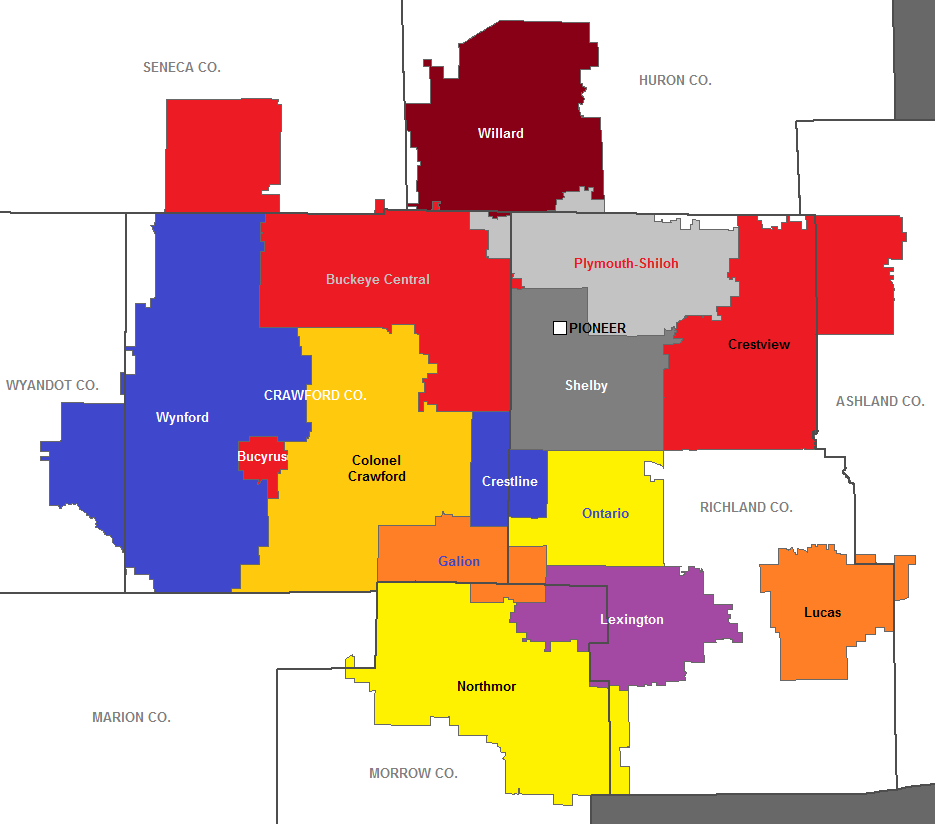
School districts served by Pioneer.
- Buckeye Central High School
- Bucyrus High School
- Colonel Crawford High School
- Crestline High School
- Crestview High School
- Galion High School
- Lexington High School
- Lucas High School
- Northmor High School
- Ontario High School
- Plymouth High School
- Shelby High School
- Willard High School
- Wynford High School
