= Daniel Willard =

American railroad executive

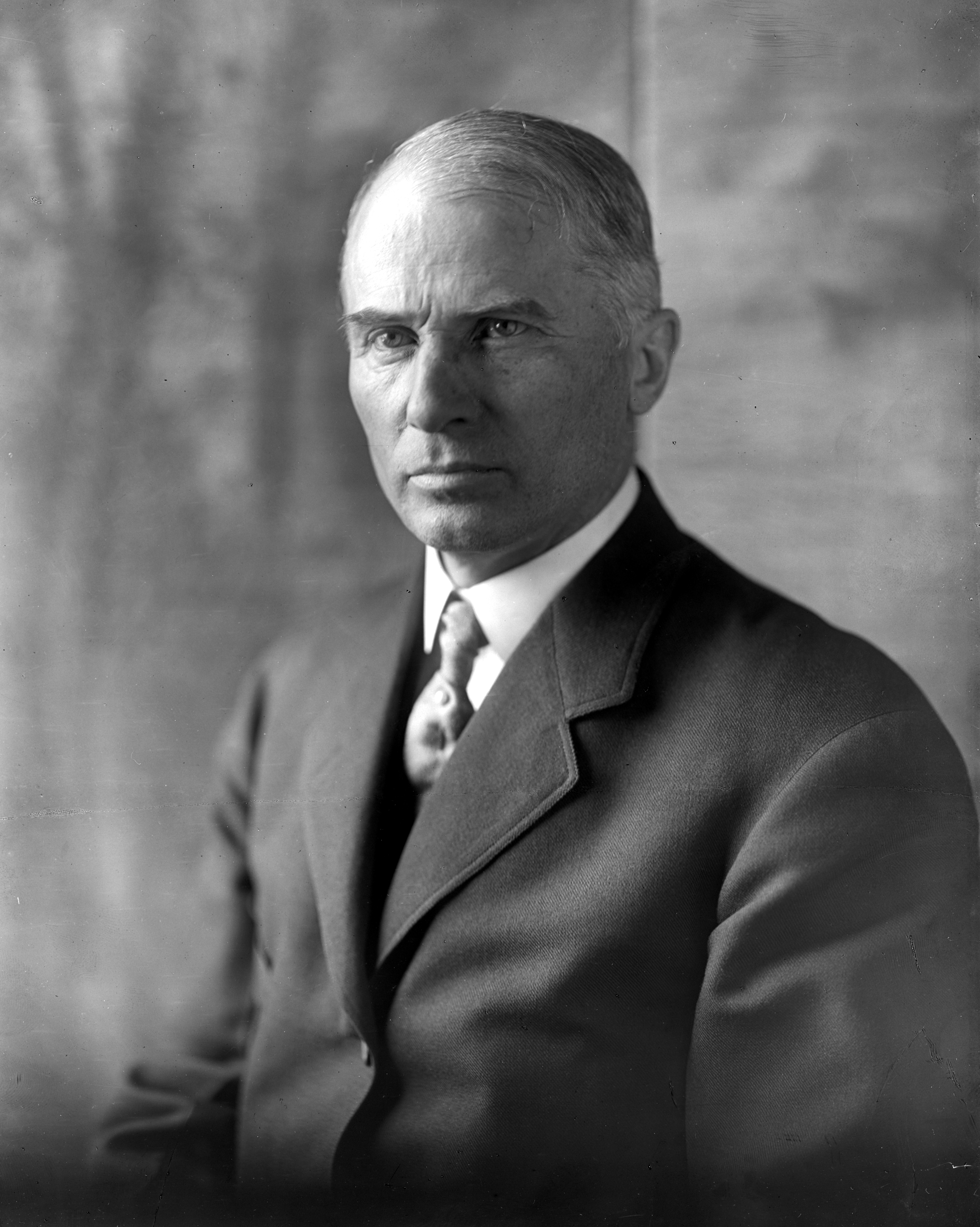
- Born: January 28, 1861; Hartland, Vermont
- Died: July 6, 1942 (aged 81); Baltimore, Maryland
- Occupation: Railroad executive
- Years active: 1878–1941
- Known for: President of Baltimore and Ohio Railroad
- Spouse: Bertha Elkins

Daniel Willard (January 28, 1861 – July 6, 1942) was an American railroad executive best known as the president of the Baltimore and Ohio Railroad (B&O) from 1910 to 1941. He served on or headed several government railroad commissions in World War I and appeared on the cover of Time magazine in 1932 due to his part in negotiating wage cuts in the Great Depression.

Popularly known as "Uncle Dan," he established the B&O's reputation as a public-minded and innovative railroad. He is also remembered in Baltimore as a trustee (and from 1926 to 1941, chairman of its board) of the Johns Hopkins University.

Willard, Ohio (originally Chicago Junction) was renamed in his honor in 1917.

== Early life ==
Daniel Willard was born on January 28, 1861, to Mr. & Mrs. Daniel S. Willard in Hartland, Vermont, a small farm village. His mother died when he was five. On his father's side, he was descended from colonist Thomas Hastings who came from the East Anglia region of England to the Massachusetts Bay Colony in 1634. Willard attended the local high school and teaching at the district school for two years starting at the age of sixteen. He boarded out with Sophie Taylor, one of his teachers, who instilled in him an appreciation of learning. Family finances were slight and he could not attend Dartmouth College as he desired; instead he attended the Massachusetts Agricultural College at Amherst, Massachusetts, in 1878. Poor eyesight, however, forced his departure after six months. This was the end of his formal education. While at Massachusetts he was a member of Phi Sigma Kappa fraternity.

His railroad career began at this time, as a track laborer on the Vermont Central Railroad. In four years he worked his way up the career ladder to become a locomotive engineer on the Lake Shore and Michigan Southern Railway. After being laid off from this job in 1884, he moved to the Soo Line, where he eventually became superintendent in 1899. (He had held acting positions for several years prior.) During this period he married Bertha Elkins of Vermont.

== Railroad management ==
In 1899 he followed his mentor, Frederick D. Underwood, to the Baltimore and Ohio for the first time, taking a position as Assistant General Manager. Two years later, he followed Underwood to the Erie Railroad, where he was made assistant to the president. He soon became third vice-president. When first vice-president George Miller Cumming stepped down in January 1903, Willard became first vice-president in his place, and then general manager. In 1904 James J. Hill convinced him to take a position as Vice President in charge of operations on the Chicago, Burlington and Quincy Railroad. In 1909 he assumed an additional similar position on the Colorado and Southern Railway, and in 1910 assumed the presidency of the B&O, a position that he held for thirty-two years, one of the longest such tenancies in the United States. He appointed Olive Dennis, the first US woman Service Engineer, to improve travelling conditions on trains, initially inspired by the needs of women travellers but then broadened to include men too.

== Government service ==
In October 1916, he was appointed a member of the Advisory Commission of the Council of National Defense, and the following March chairman of the Commission. After the entrance of the United States into World War I, he was appointed in July 1917 a member of the special committee of the Council of National Defense to secure mediation in case of strikes on war contracts. In November 1917, he was appointed by President Woodrow Wilson to be chairman of the War Industries Board, charged with devising and expediting means of producing the government's industrial requirements for effective warfare. In January 1918, he resigned in order to devote personal attention to the Baltimore and Ohio Railroad. When the government temporarily nationalized the railroads during the war (see United States Railroad Administration), a federal manager displaced him as operating head of the B&O, but he remained president in charge of its corporate affairs.

== University board ==
Willard was appointed as a trustee of the Johns Hopkins University in 1914, and was chairman of the board from 1926 to 1941.

== Legacy ==
- The World War II Liberty Ship SS Daniel Willard was named in his honor.
- The city of Willard, Ohio, was renamed for him in 1917.

== See also ==
- List of railroad executives
