= Gayle Manning =

American politician (born 1950)

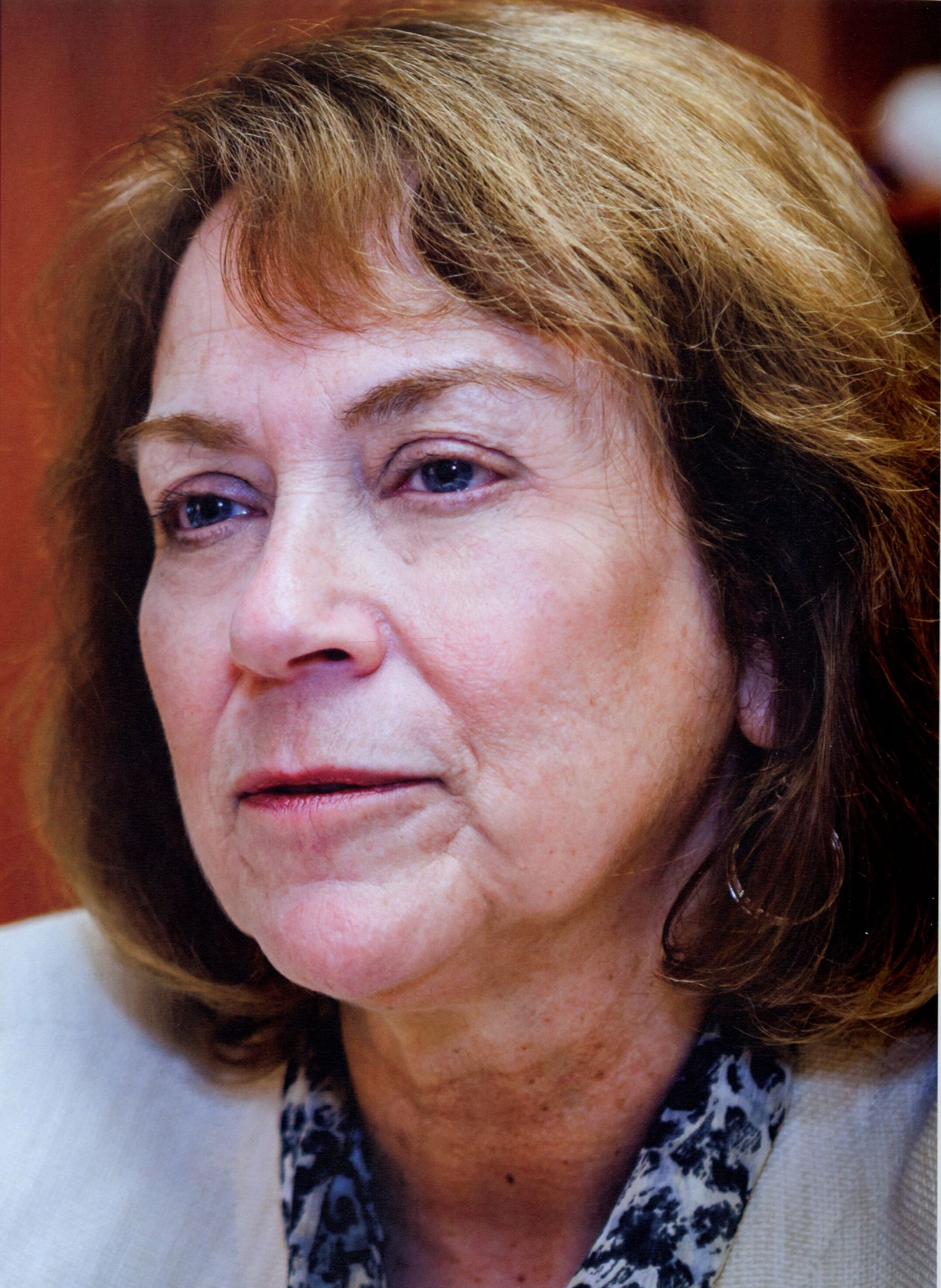

Member-elect of the Ohio Senate from the 13th district
- Assuming office January 4, 2027
- Succeeding: Nathan Manning
- In office January 3, 2011 – December 31, 2018
- Preceded by: Sue Morano
- Succeeded by: Nathan Manning

Speaker pro tempore of the Ohio House of Representatives
- Incumbent
- Assumed office January 6, 2025
- Preceded by: Scott Oelslager

Member of the Ohio House of Representatives
- Incumbent
- Assumed office January 7, 2019
- Preceded by: Nathan Manning
- Constituency: 55th district (2019–2023); 52nd district (2023–present)

Personal details
- Born: March 2, 1950 (age 76)
- Party: Republican
- Spouse: Jeffrey Manning (died 2004)
- Children: Nathan
- Education: Kent State University (BS); Baldwin Wallace University (attended); John Carroll University (attended); University of Akron (MS)

Gayle L. Gerhart Manning (born March 2, 1950) is a member of the Ohio House of Representatives, serving since 2019. Formerly, she was a member of the Ohio Senate, serving the 13th district from 2011 to 2018. Manning also taught elementary school students in North Olmsted City Schools for 37 years, winning numerous awards and citations for her accomplishments in education. She was named Educator of the Year by the North Olmsted Council of PTA and received the Teacher in American Enterprise Award from the Ohio Council on Economic Education.

== Key Legislation ==
Senator Manning co-sponsored legislation in 2013 that the Lorain Morning Journal hailed as “life-saving.” The legislation allows law enforcement officers quicker access to cell phone records of people who are believed to be kidnapped or missing and in danger.

== Controversies ==
Then Senator Manning drew criticism after a report published by the League of Women Voters of Ohio on May 6, 2019 released a 2011 email from the Senator to Ray DiRossi, a Republican operative contracted for $105,000 to draw new district lines for state elections after the 2010 census. After mentioning that “[She] knows they are looking for Republicans in Lorain County” Senator Manning listed several individual streets within the city of Lorain where she had previously “gained a good response from the people.”

Another email from the same report detailed a meeting between DiRossi and Senator Manning in “the bunker”, the name DiRossi and his staff described a Double Tree hotel room just outside the statehouse. The report concluded that this taxpayer-funded hotel room was used “to ensure no one could gain access to the redistricting plans”. According to the League of Women Voters, for meetings like Senator Manning's “every effort was made to conduct deliberations in private”.

Ohio House of Representatives
| Preceded by Scott Oelslager | Speaker pro tempore of the Ohio House of Representatives; 2025–present | Incumbent |
