= Alan Zaleski =

American politician (1942–2025)

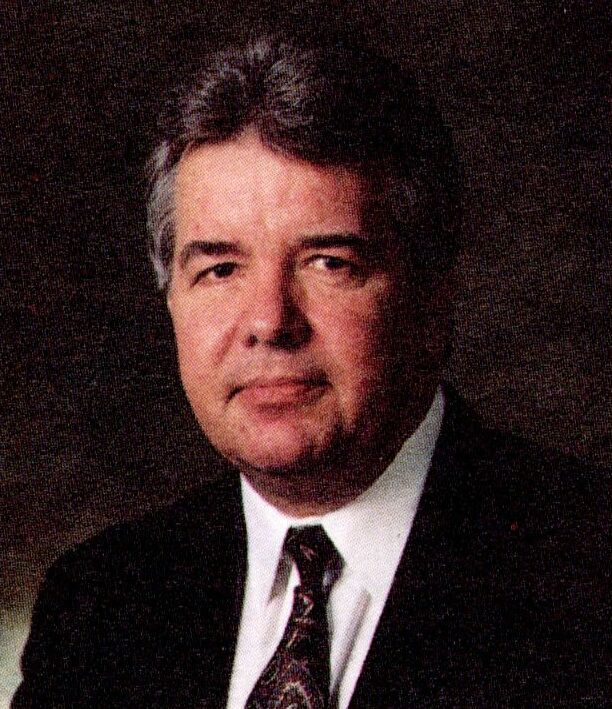

Member of the Ohio Senate from the 13th district
- In office January 3, 1983 – December 31, 1998
- Preceded by: Ronald Nabakowski
- Succeeded by: Jeff Armbruster

Personal details
- Born: August 12, 1942
- Died: February 15, 2025 (aged 82) Lorain, Ohio, U.S.
- Party: Democratic

Alan J. Zaleski (August 12, 1942 – February 15, 2025) was an American politician who was a member of the Ohio Senate from 1983 to 1998, representing the 13th district, which encompasses much of Lorain County, Ohio. By 1998, Zaleski faced term limits, and was subsequently succeeded by Jeff Armbruster, a Republican. Zaleski died on February 15, 2025, at the age of 82.

Ohio Senate
Preceded by Ronald Nabakowski	Senator from 13th District; 1982–1998	Succeeded by Jeff Armbruster
