= 1998 Victory Bowl =

Maranatha Baptist Crusaders	Geneva Golden Tornadoes
(6–3)	(7–3)
6	27
Head coach: Terry Price	Head coach: Geno DeMarco
	1	2	3	4	Total
Maranatha Baptist	0	6	0	0	6
Geneva	7	3	10	7	27
- Date: November 28, 1998
- Season: 1998
- Stadium: Fawcett Stadium
- Location: Canton, Ohio
- MVP: Justin Myers QB (Geneva College), Bryan Brock DE (Maranatha Baptist)
- Attendance: 637

The 1998 Victory Bowl, the second edition of the annual game, was a college football bowl game played on Saturday, November 28, 1998, at Fawcett Stadium in Canton, Ohio. It featured the Geneva Golden Tornadoes against the Maranatha Baptist Crusaders. The Tornadoes won 27–6.

== Scoring summary ==
Scoring summary

Quarter	Time	Drive			Team	Scoring information	Score	
Quarter	Time	Plays	Yards	TOP	Team	Scoring information	Maranatha Baptist Crusaders	Geneva Golden Tornadoes
1	8:50				Geneva Golden Tornadoes	Mike Holaren 47-yard touchdown reception from Justin Myers, Jason Gill kick Good	0	7
2	14:55	8	73	7:15	Maranatha Baptist Crusaders	Mark Brock 25-yard touchdown reception from Kevin Taylor, Troy Campbell kick Failed	6	7
2	4:14				Geneva Golden Tornadoes	30-yard field goal by Vince Dalicandro	6	10
3	9:32				Geneva Golden Tornadoes	27-yard field goal by Vince Dalicandro	6	13
3	4:48				Geneva Golden Tornadoes	Jayson Rice 9-yard touchdown reception from Justin Myers, Jason Gill kick Good	6	20
4	11:09				Geneva Golden Tornadoes	Jon Stevens 6-yard touchdown reception from Justin Myers, Jason Gill kick Good	6	27
"TOP" = time of possession. For other American football terms, see Glossary of American football.							Maranatha Baptist Crusaders	Geneva Golden Tornadoes
