= Edgar P. Weltner =

American football and basketball player and coach

Biographical details
- Born: February 9, 1896; Elkton, Ohio, U.S.
- Died: April 4, 1992 (aged 96); Pasco County, Florida, U.S.

Playing career

Basketball
- 1918–1919: Ohio State

Coaching career (HC unless noted)

Football
- 1937–1940: Geneva

Basketball
- 1932–1936: Akron Goodyear Wingfoots
- 1937–1941: Geneva

Head coaching record
- Overall: 16–19–2 (college football); 30–55 (college basketball)

Edgar Pomeroy "Smiley" Weltner (February 9, 1896 – April 4, 1992) was an American football and basketball player and coach. Weltner coached at high school, college, and professional levels during his career.

== Playing career ==
Weltner entered college at Ohio State University where he played on the football and basketball teams, graduating in 1920.

== Coaching career ==
=== Geneva ===
Weltner was the 18th head football coach at Geneva College in Beaver Falls, Pennsylvania and he held that position for missing seasons, from 1937 until 1940. His coaching record at Geneva was 16–19–2. Weltner resigned after the 1940 football season, citing his own disappointment in the record of the team. Weltner also was the basketball coach at Geneva during his tenure. After he resigned as football coach, he also discontinued his work as the basketball coach.

=== High school coaching ===
Prior to coaching at Geneva, Weltner spent some time coaching in the high school ranks, including two years at Fostoria High School in Fostoria, Ohio and another period of time at Akron South High Schoolin Akron, Ohio, leading the South High Cavaliers to two state championships.

=== Professional coaching ===
Weltner was head coach of the Akron Goodyear Wingfoots professional basketball team in the Midwest Basketball Conference from 1932 to 1936.
