= Don Pease =

American politician (1931–2002)

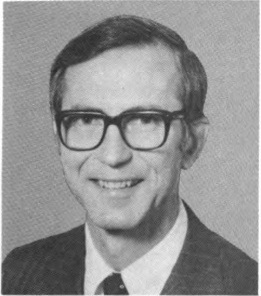

Member of the U.S. House of Representatives from Ohio's 13th district
- In office January 3, 1977 – January 3, 1993
- Preceded by: Charles Adams Mosher
- Succeeded by: Sherrod Brown

Member of the Ohio Senate from the 13th district
- In office January 3, 1975 – January 3, 1977
- Preceded by: Robert J. Corts
- Succeeded by: Ronald Nabowski

Member of the Ohio House of Representatives from the 54th district
- In office January 3, 1969 – December 31, 1974
- Preceded by: Henry Schriver
- Succeeded by: Scribner Fauver

Personal details
- Born: September 26, 1931 Toledo, Ohio, U.S.
- Died: July 28, 2002 (aged 70) Oberlin, Ohio, U.S.
- Party: Democratic

Donald James Pease (September 26, 1931 – July 28, 2002) was an American politician. He served eight terms as a member of the United States House of Representatives from Ohio's 13th district, an area in northeast Ohio. He was a Democrat.

== Education and early life ==
Pease was born in Toledo, Ohio. He attended Ohio University in Athens, Ohio, supporting himself through college by working summers as a laborer at a Toledo oil refinery. Pease was the president of the student body, the editor of the student newspaper (The Post), and a student reporter for the Athens Messenger. He was a member of Delta Tau Delta fraternity. He graduated from Ohio University with a bachelor's degree in journalism in 1953. He earned a master's degree in government from Ohio University in 1955 and completed graduate work as a Fulbright Scholar at King's College, Durham University.

After serving two years in the U.S. Army from 1955 to 1957, Pease moved to Oberlin, Ohio. Pease became editor and copublisher of the weekly local newspaper, Oberlin News-Tribune. He was a member of the International Society of Weekly Newspaper Editors (ISWNE), winning ISWNE's Golden Quill Award for editorial writing in 1962 and serving as president of the Society in 1965.

== Political career ==
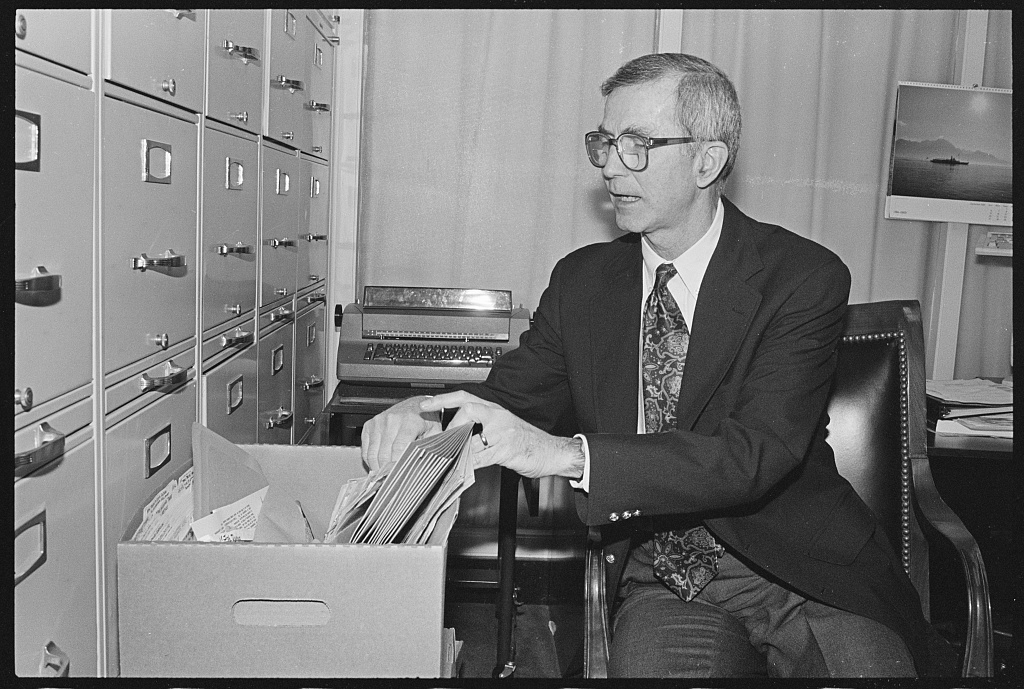
Pease going through files in his office, December 1992

Pease's political career began with his election to the Oberlin City Council in 1961. He served in the Ohio Senate from 1965 to 1967. In 1968, he was elected to the Ohio House of Representatives, where he served from 1969 to 1975. In 1974, he was again elected to the Ohio Senate, where he served from 1975 to 1977.

Early in his career, Pease established a reputation for honesty and integrity, which he maintained throughout his political career. Pease was a member of the Democratic Party and was regarded as a liberal (supporting progressive tax reform, advocating for universal human rights, linking respect for internationally recognized worker rights to international trade, aid, and investment agreements, upholding civil liberties, emphasizing education reform, and other liberal causes). He was well respected as a reasonable and ethical public servant, even by his conservative colleagues, who saw him as a "straight arrow."

In 1976, Pease was elected to the U.S. House of Representatives (95th Congress). He served eight terms in Congress, easily winning all eight elections in the Democratic-leaning 13th Congressional District of Ohio. His long-time Chief of Staff and Legislative Director was Bill Goold whom Pease had hired upon his graduation from Oberlin College.

== Uganda trade ban ==
Pease quickly distinguished himself as a skillful legislator and staunch human rights advocate. Over the opposition of the Carter Administration, Pease, in his first term of Congress, sponsored legislation, which passed, to cut off US trade with Uganda, which was enduring a brutal reign of terror at the hands of the infamous dictator Idi Amin in which at least 500,000 Ugandans perished.

Within months of the establishment of the enactment of the trade ban, Amin was deposed. The trade ban resulted in the sudden loss of hundreds of million of dollars in hard currency to Amin, mostly from coffee exports to the US, which had been used by Amin to buy arms, luxury goods, and the loyalty of his mercenary army. It is widely considered one of the best examples of the most effective uses of economic sanctions in modern US foreign policy.

== Trade-linked workers' rights ==
Pease was the legislative champion of the rapidly growing movement inside and outside of Congress in the early 1980s to link respect for internationally recognized workers' rights, such as prohibiting exploitative child labor in the production of products for export, to international trade, investment and aid agreements to which the US is a party. He successfully authored six different laws in this regard before he left Congress.

== Tax legislation ==
Pease authored controversial legislation within the United States Internal Revenue Code (income tax code) that partially disallowed itemized deductions for taxpayers with adjusted gross incomes above certain thresholds, known as the "Pease Limitations."

== Later life ==
Pease decided not to run for re-election in 1992. After leaving Congress, he taught as Visiting Distinguished Professor of Politics at Oberlin College. He was also appointed by Bill Clinton to the Amtrak Board of Directors and served five years.

Pease married Jeanne Camille Wendt August 29, 1953, who still resides in Oberlin. One daughter, Jennifer, was born on August 30, 1964.

Pease died in Oberlin, July 28, 2002.

== See also ==
- Politics of the United States
- Politics of Ohio

U.S. House of Representatives
Preceded by Charles Adams Mosher	Member of the U.S. House of Representatives from Ohio's 13th congressional district 1977–1993	Succeeded by Sherrod Brown
