= Robert J. Corts =

American politician

Member of the Ohio Senate from the 13th district
- In office January 3, 1969 – December 31, 1974
- Preceded by: Harry Jump
- Succeeded by: Don Pease

Personal details
- Born: March 5, 1917 Cleveland, Ohio, U.S.
- Died: August 25, 2013 (aged 96) Elyria, Ohio, U.S.
- Party: Republican

Robert J. Corts (March 5, 1917 – August 25, 2013) was an American judge and politician who was a member of the Ohio Senate. Representing the 13th District from 1969−1974, Corts represented the area in and around Lorain.

Corts died on August 25, 2013.
