= Harry Jump =

American politician

Member of the Ohio Senate from the 13th district
- In office January 3, 1967 – December 31, 1968
- Preceded by: District Created
- Succeeded by: Robert J. Corts

Personal details
- Born: November 7, 1914
- Died: February 14, 1989 (aged 74) Willard, Ohio, U.S.
- Party: Republican

Harry V. Jump (November 7, 1914 – February 14, 1989) was a former member of the Ohio Senate. He served the 13th District from 1967 to 1968. Jump resigned midway throughout his term to serve under Ohio Governor Jim Rhodes. He was succeeded by Robert J. Corts He later served as Senate Clerk, then Insurance Director under Jim Rhodes in the seventies. He died at his home in Willard, Ohio, on February 14, 1989, of an apparent heart attack.
