= Gene Sullivan (American football) =

American football coach

Coaching career (HC unless noted)
- 1976–1992: Geneva

Head coaching record
- Overall: 76–82–2

Gene Sullivan is an American former football coach. He was the 28th head football coach at the Geneva College in Beaver Falls, Pennsylvania, serving for 17 seasons, from 1976 to 1992, and compiling a record of 76–82–2.

While at Geneva, Sullivan hired Mark Mangino as an assistant coach. Geneva's current head coach Geno DeMarco first played and later was an assistant coach for Sullivan.
