= Ronald Nabakowski =

American politician (1942–2016)

Lorain County Clerk of Courts

Executive Director of the Ohio Lottery Commission
- Governor: Dick Celeste

Member of the Ohio Senate from the 13th district
- In office January 3, 1977 – December 31, 1982
- Preceded by: Don Pease
- Succeeded by: Alan Zaleski

Auditor of Lorain

Personal details
- Born: Ronald Lee Nabakowski; February 15, 1942 Lorain, Ohio, U.S.
- Died: June 10, 2016 (aged 74) Amherst, Ohio, U.S.
- Party: Democratic
- Spouse: Dorothea Jurinec
- Children: 7

Ronald Lee Nabakowski (February 15, 1942 – June 10, 2016) was an American politician and public administrator from Lorain, Ohio. A member of the Democratic Party, he served as Lorain City Auditor, as a member of the Ohio Senate from 1977 to 1982, and as executive director of the Ohio Lottery in the cabinet of Governor Dick Celeste. He later served as a Lorain County commissioner and as Lorain County Clerk of Courts until his retirement in 2014. In his later years he was a prominent advocate for the revitalization of downtown Lorain and its Black River waterfront.

== Early life ==
Nabakowski was born in Lorain on February 15, 1942, to Walter and Hilda (née Klingshirn) Nabakowski. He became active in politics at a young age and received a Young Man of the Year award in 1967.

== Political career ==
=== Lorain City Auditor ===
Nabakowski was elected auditor of the city of Lorain in 1971, his first elected office.

=== Ohio Senate ===
In 1976, Nabakowski was elected to the Ohio Senate from the 13th district, succeeding Don Pease, who had been elected to the United States House of Representatives. He took office on January 3, 1977, and served until December 31, 1982. He was succeeded by fellow Democrat Alan Zaleski. A lifelong Democrat, Nabakowski counted his bipartisan work with Republican colleagues on legislation among his proudest accomplishments.

=== Ohio Lottery ===
Nabakowski was appointed executive director of the Ohio Lottery Commission by Governor Dick Celeste, serving as a member of Celeste's cabinet. He was serving as director by the fall of 1985. In February 1986 he signed the agency's agreement to lease or purchase a new telephone system from TCI.

Nabakowski's tenure coincided with several milestones in the Lottery's history. On February 7, 1987, the Lottery debuted Cash Explosion, its weekly televised game show, which became the longest-running state lottery game show in the United States. The show had first been proposed in 1984 by then-executive director Thomas V. Chema and marketing director David Gale, and it was developed with Marcus Advertising and game show producer Les Roberts before premiering under Nabakowski's leadership. In 1988, the Lottery introduced the Kicker, an optional add-on game played with Super Lotto tickets. Also in 1987, Ohio voters approved a constitutional amendment permanently dedicating Lottery profits to education, and in March 1988 the legislature passed House Bill 789, creating the Lottery Profits Education Fund. He requested a formal opinion from the Ohio Attorney General on whether the commission had the authority to enter into multi-state lottery agreements, which was issued in 1988 as Opinion No. 88-002.

As director, Nabakowski was the named plaintiff in Nabakowski v. 5400 Corporation, in which the Lottery sought to recover nearly $200,000 in unauthorized wagers placed on a lottery terminal without payment. The Ohio Court of Appeals held the officers of the corporation that operated the terminal personally liable, because they had continued doing business after its corporate charter was canceled.

According to his obituary, during his tenure the Lottery provided 17 cents of every state dollar spent on primary and secondary education in Ohio.

=== Lorain County offices ===
Nabakowski later returned to local government in Lorain County, serving as a county commissioner. He was then elected Lorain County Clerk of Courts, the officer who keeps the records of the Lorain County Court of Common Pleas. He held the office by 2006, and his name appears as clerk on the court's judgment entries in 2006 and 2008. He retired as clerk in 2014.

== Downtown Lorain revitalization ==
In his later years, Nabakowski became an active promoter of downtown Lorain and its waterfront along the Black River. He served on the Lorain Tourism Board, and he wrote and published an online newsletter, the Waterfront Arts & Entertainment District Intelligencer, which promoted downtown events and development under the motto "All of us are smarter than any of us."

In 2009, Nabakowski proposed converting the vacant Broadway Building in downtown Lorain into the "Lake Erie Adventure Inn", a hotel that would serve as a base for visiting anglers taking charter fishing trips on Lake Erie and guided trips on the Black River. Looking back on the years after his proposal, he said, "We've brought hundreds of thousands of people downtown since then." He opened 2016 with newsletter commentaries renewing his call for a downtown hotel, suggesting a remodeling investment of up to $7 million that would include a rooftop café and two rooftop luxury suites.

In February 2016, while praising the growth of downtown summer festivals, he argued that "there needs to be more", and he proposed a "Waterfront WalleyeFest" to be held alongside the Cabela's Masters Walleye Circuit tournament, which was coming to Lorain.

== Personal life and death ==
Nabakowski married Dorothea Jurinec, and they were married for 55 years. They had seven children, one of whom, a daughter named Cynthia Ann, died before him. He was a practicing Catholic.

Nabakowski died in Amherst, Ohio, on June 10, 2016, at the age of 74, after a long illness with amyotrophic lateral sclerosis (ALS). A Mass of Christian Burial was held at St. Joseph Parish in Amherst, and he was buried at St. Joseph Cemetery in Amherst.

Political offices
Preceded by Don Pease	Member of the Ohio Senate from the 13th district 1977–1982	Succeeded by Alan Zaleski
