= Sue Morano =

American politician

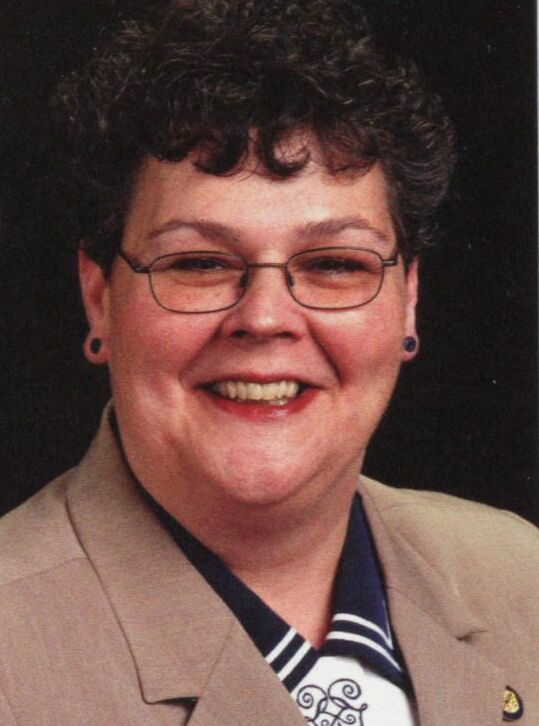

Member of the Ohio Senate from the 13th district
- In office January 2, 2007–December 31, 2010
- Preceded by: Jeff Armbruster
- Succeeded by: Gayle Manning

Personal details
- Born: May 8, 1960 (age 66) San Diego, California
- Party: Democratic
- Spouse: Mark Morano
- Profession: Registered Nurse

Sue Morano (born May 8, 1960) is a Democratic Party politician who served as a member of the Ohio Senate.

== Life and career ==
Born and raised in Nova, Ohio, Morano is a registered nurse who maintains shifts at the local county hospital even currently. A graduate of [Mapleton High School] and Lorain County Community College, Morano resides in Lorain.

== Ohio Senate ==
In 2002, Morano faced Republican Party Senator Jeff Armbruster in his reelection campaign in the Ohio Senate. A historically Democratic district, Morano was seen as having the best potential opportunity to pick off an incumbent state Senator in the 2002 cycle. In a divisive campaign, Armbruster barely won reelection, beating Morano by less than 600 votes. It was so close that Morano refused to concede on election night as more official results were tallied. Armbruster defeated Morano by fewer than 400 votes.

With Armbruster term limited and unable to run for reelection in 2006, Morano ran for the open seat. This time, she was successful, securing more than 60% of the electorate in an overwhelmingly Democratic year. She took her seat in the Ohio Senate on January 2, 2007. For the next four years, Morano focused on issues such as education, and was a leader in health initiatives.

In 2010, Morano was seen again by Republicans as a top target, and as one of the easier seats to pick up. While Morano remained popular, an overwhelmingly Republican year made the race competitive, and divisive. The Republicans nominated Gayle Manning, a former city councilwoman and teacher, to face Morano. She defeated Morano by 6,000 votes.

Following her defeat, Morano returned to Lorain where she works as an ICU nurse.
