= Jeff Armbruster =

American politician

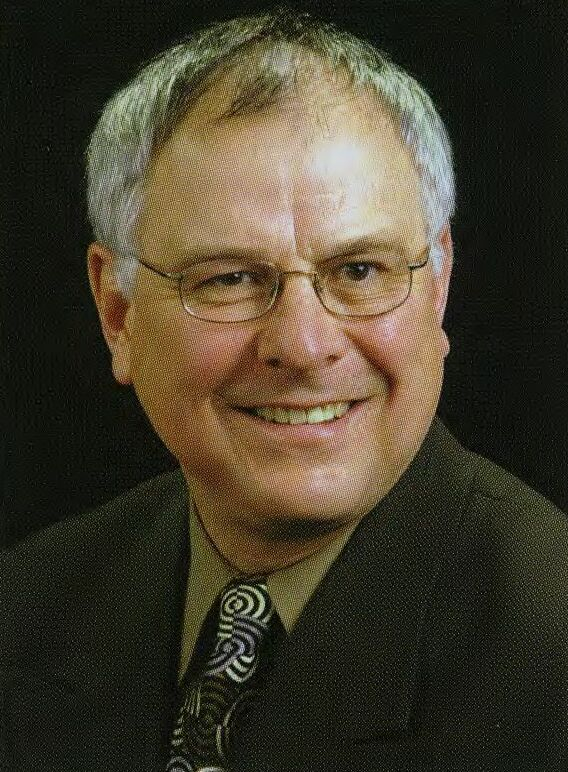

Member of the Ohio Senate from the 13th district
- In office January 5, 1999 – December 31, 2006
- Preceded by: Alan Zaleski
- Succeeded by: Sue Morano

Personal details
- Born: August 30, 1947 Normal, Illinois
- Died: May 15, 2026 (aged 78) North Ridgeville, Ohio
- Party: Republican
- Education: Millikin University

Jeffry Armbruster (August 30, 1947 – May 15, 2026) was an Ohio politician. He served two terms as the mayor of North Ridgeville, Ohio and represented the 13th district in the Ohio Senate from 1999 to 2006. He was the safety service director of North Ridgeville.

== Biography ==
=== Early life and education ===
Armbruster graduated from Millikin University in 1969.
