= Willard, Ohio =

- City
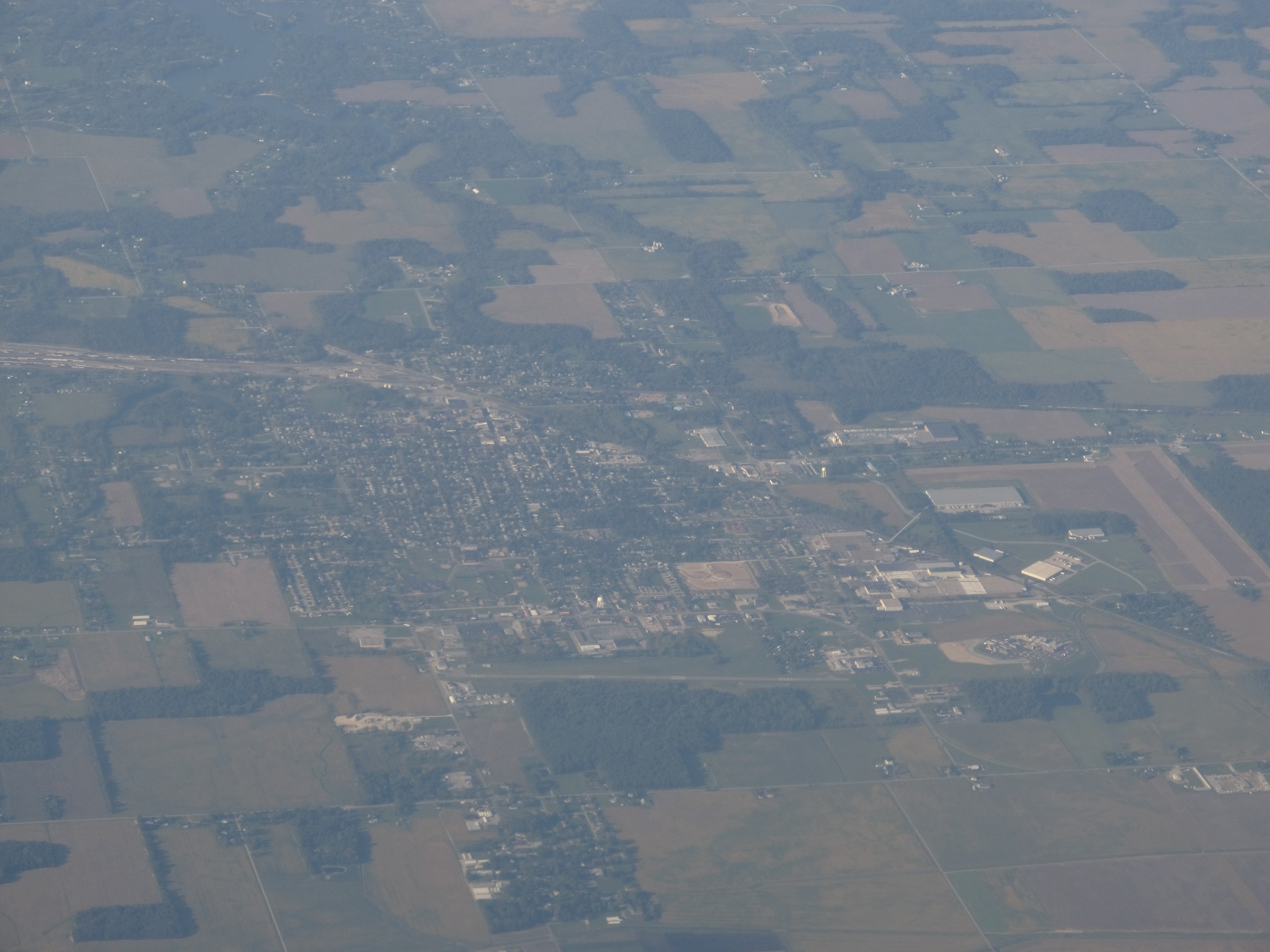
- Aerial view of Willard, September 2012
- Etymology: Daniel Willard
- Nickname: "The City of Blossoms"
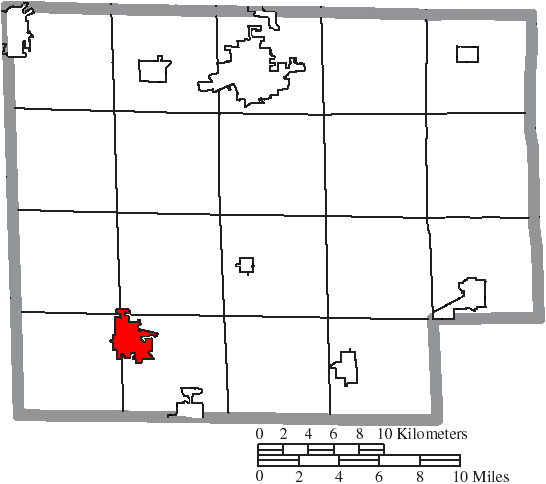
- Location of Willard in Huron County

- Location within Ohio Location within the United States
- Coordinates: 41°03′06″N 82°43′24″W
- Country: United States
- State: Ohio
- County: Huron
- Town founded: 1874 (as Chicago)
- Town incorporated: 1882 (as Chicago Junction)
- City incorporated: 1960 (as Willard)

Government
  - Type: Council/Manager
  - City Manager: Bryson Hamons

Area
  - Total: 3.60 sq mi (9.33 km^{2})
  - Land: 3.58 sq mi (9.27 km^{2})
  - Water: 0.023 sq mi (0.06 km^{2})
- Elevation: 938 ft (286 m)

Population (2020)
  - Total: 6,197
  - Density: 1,730.8/sq mi (668.27/km^{2})
- Time zone: UTC-5 (Eastern (EST))
  - Summer (DST): UTC-4 (EDT)
- ZIP codes: 44888, 44890
- Area code: 419
- FIPS code: 39-85232
- GNIS feature ID: 1086362
- Website: www.willardohio.gov

Willard is a city in southwestern Huron County, Ohio, United States, approximately 14 miles (23 km) southwest of Norwalk. The population was 6,197 at the 2020 census.

== History ==
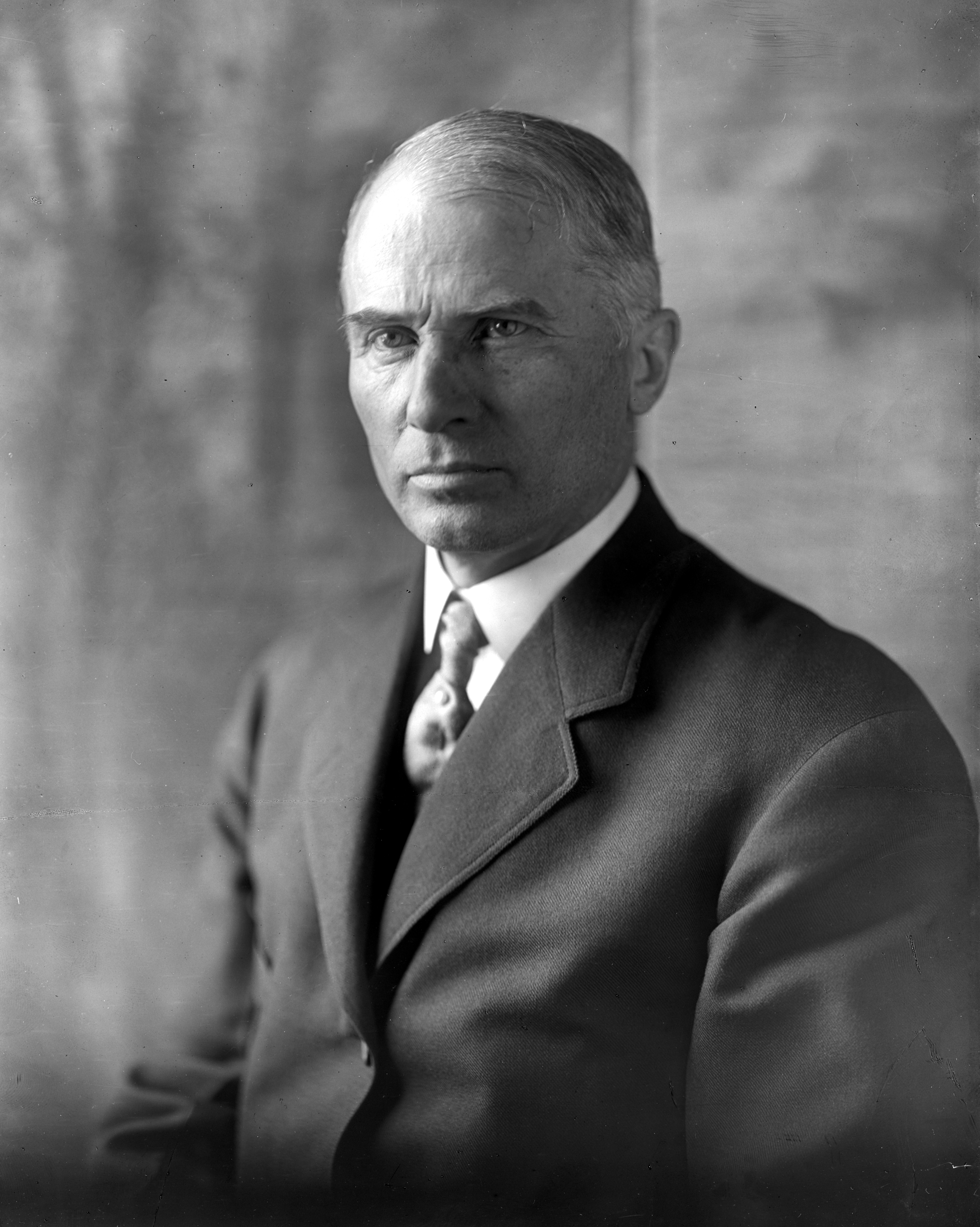
Daniel Willard, the namesake of the city of Willard, c. 1920s

The original name of Willard was Chicago, named for the junction of the Baltimore and Ohio Railroad's line to Sandusky (the Sandusky, Mansfield and Newark Railroad) and the branch west to Chicago (the Baltimore and Ohio and Chicago Railroad). Later the Akron and Chicago Junction Railroad was built east from the junction, providing a more direct route between the Northeastern United States and Chicago.

With the name "Chicago", passengers would mistake the community for Chicago, Illinois, so they changed the name to Chicago Junction, however, the word "junction" did not fit on boards at the time so it did not fix the problem. In 1917, to finally rectify the confusion, the town changed its name to Willard, after the then president of the B&O, Daniel Willard. Willard officially became a city in the year of 1960

== Geography ==
According to the United States Census Bureau, the city has a total area of 3.57 square miles (9.25 km^{2}), of which 3.55 square miles (9.19 km^{2}) is land and 0.02 square miles (0.05 km^{2}) is water.

To the south of Willard are located the unincorporated communities of Celeryville and New Haven, plus the planned development of Holiday Lakes to the north.

== Demographics ==
Historical population
Census	Pop.	Note	%±
1880	662		—
1890	1,299		96.2%
1900	2,348		80.8%
1910	2,950		25.6%
1920	3,889		31.8%
1930	4,514		16.1%
1940	4,261		−5.6%
1950	4,744		11.3%
1960	5,457		15.0%
1970	5,510		1.0%
1980	5,720		3.8%
1990	6,210		8.6%
2000	6,806		9.6%
2010	6,236		−8.4%
2020	6,197		−0.6%
2025 (est.)	6,130		−1.1%

=== 2020 census ===
As of the 2020 census, Willard had a population of 6,197. The median age was 37.1 years. 26.5% of residents were under the age of 18 and 17.7% of residents were 65 years of age or older. For every 100 females there were 91.9 males, and for every 100 females age 18 and over there were 86.6 males age 18 and over.

98.8% of residents lived in urban areas, while 1.2% lived in rural areas.

There were 2,424 households in Willard, of which 33.1% had children under the age of 18 living in them. Of all households, 37.4% were married-couple households, 18.7% were households with a male householder and no spouse or partner present, and 34.5% were households with a female householder and no spouse or partner present. About 31.5% of all households were made up of individuals and 13.8% had someone living alone who was 65 years of age or older.

There were 2,719 housing units, of which 10.8% were vacant. The homeowner vacancy rate was 2.1% and the rental vacancy rate was 7.9%.

Racial composition as of the 2020 census
Race	Number	Percent
White	4,898	79.0%
Black or African American	91	1.5%
American Indian and Alaska Native	33	0.5%
Asian	16	0.3%
Native Hawaiian and Other Pacific Islander	2	0.0%
Some other race	587	9.5%
Two or more races	570	9.2%
Hispanic or Latino (of any race)	1,355	21.9%

=== 2010 census ===
As of the 2010 census, there were 6,236 people, 2,365 households, and 1,585 families living in the city. The population density was 1,756.6 inhabitants per square mile (678.2/km^{2}). There were 2,687 housing units at an average density of 756.9 per square mile (292.2/km^{2}). The racial makeup of the city was 90.0% White, 1.8% African American, 0.2% Native American, 0.2% Asian, 5.6% from other races, and 2.1% from two or more races. Hispanic or Latino of any race were 18.9% of the population.

There were 2,365 households, of which 37.1% had children under the age of 18 living with them, 44.1% were married couples living together, 17.5% had a female householder with no husband present, 5.4% had a male householder with no wife present, and 33.0% were non-families. 28.2% of all households were made up of individuals, and 11.2% had someone living alone who was 65 years of age or older. The average household size was 2.60 and the average family size was 3.15.

The median age in the city was 34.6 years. 28.7% of residents were under the age of 18; 9.2% were between the ages of 18 and 24; 24.8% were from 25 to 44; 23.7% were from 45 to 64; and 13.8% were 65 years of age or older. The gender makeup of the city was 48% male, 52% female.

=== 2000 census ===
As of the 2000 census, there were 6,806 people, 2,545 households, and 1,738 families living in the city. The population density was 1,963.0 inhabitants per square mile (757.9/km^{2}). There were 2,715 housing units at an average density of 783.1 per square mile (302.4/km^{2}). The racial makeup of the city was 90.32% White, 1.54% African American, 0.19% Native American, 0.31% Asian, 0.01% Pacific Islander, 6.11% from other races, and 1.51% from two or more races. Hispanic or Latino of any race were 12.47% of the population.

There were 2,545 households, out of which 38.0% had children under the age of 18 living with them, 50.1% were married couples living together, 14.0% had a female householder with no husband present, and 31.7% were non-families. 27.7% of all households were made up of individuals, and 11.6% had someone living alone who was 65 years of age or older. The average household size was 2.63 and the average family size was 3.22.

In the city the population was spread out, with 30.8% under the age of 18, 9.8% from 18 to 24, 27.8% from 25 to 44, 19.4% from 45 to 64, and 12.2% who were 65 years of age or older. The median age was 32 years. For every 100 females, there were 90.1 males. For every 100 females age 18 and over, there were 86.7 males.

The median income for a household in the city was $28,911, and the median income for a family was $35,271. Males had a median income of $30,377 versus $22,702 for females. The per capita income for the city was $13,942. About 12.7% of families and 16.2% of the population were below the poverty line, including 20.9% of those under age 18 and 9.5% of those age 65 or over.

== Economy ==
Several key businesses have a presence in Willard, including the Willard Rail Yard of CSX Transportation, [{Stanley Black & Decker}] (formerly Midwest Industries), LSC Communications (formerly known as RR Donnelley), Pepperidge Farm, Star of the West Milling Company, and Mercy Hospital of Willard. Farmland surrounds the community, with the primary crops being soybeans, wheat, onions, radishes, lettuce, and sweet corn. The well known farms are Wiers and Buurma farms.

== Education ==
Willard City School District operates Willard High School in the city. Willard High School students are able to choose between the local school and Pioneer Career and Technology Center (located in Shelby, Ohio) in order to learn a trade skill.

Willard is served by the Willard Memorial Library.

== Notable people ==
- Charlie Frye, NFL quarterback
- Harry Jump, Ohio State Senator
- Pam Postema, first woman to umpire a Major League Baseball spring training game

== See also ==
- List of cities in Ohio
