= Willard High School (Ohio) =

Location
- 1 Flashes Avenue; Willard, Ohio 44890; United States; 41°2′51″N 82°43′45″W

Information
- Type: Public
- School district: Willard City Schools
- NCES School ID: 390450901994
- Principal: Doug Selvey
- Teaching staff: 25.51 (FTE)
- Grades: 9–12
- Enrollment: 319 (2024–25)
- Student to teacher ratio: 12.50
- Colors: Crimson and white
- Athletics conference: Northern 10 Athletic Conference
- Team name: Crimson Flashes
- Accreditation: Ohio Department of Education
- Website: www.willard.k12.oh.us/willardhighschool_home.aspx

Willard High School is a public high school in Willard, Ohio, United States. It is the only high school in the Willard City School District. Athletic teams are known as the Crimson Flashes and compete as members of the Northern 10 Athletic Conference after having previously been members of the Northern Ohio League from 1944 to 2017 and the Sandusky Bay Conference from 2017 to 2026.

== Notable alumni ==
- Red Davis, professional football player in the National Football League (NFL)
- Charlie Frye, professional football player in the NFL
