= Geno DeMarco =

American football player and coach

Current position
- Title: Quarterbacks coach
- Team: Geneva College
- Conference: PAC

Playing career
- 1981–1983: Geneva
- Position: Linebacker

Coaching career (HC unless noted)
- 1985: Georgia Tech (GA)
- 1986–1987: West Virginia (DL/DB)
- 1988–1992: Geneva (assistant)
- 1993–2025: Geneva
- 2026–present: Geneva (QBs)

Head coaching record
- Overall: 173–163
- Bowls: 5–2
- Tournaments: 1–2 (NAIA playoffs)

Accomplishments and honors

Championships
- 2 MSFA Mideast (1996–1997)

Geno DeMarco is an American former college football coach and quarterbacks coach for the Geneva College Golden Tornadoes football team. He served as the head football coach for Geneva College, a position he held from 1993 to 2025. DeMarco was the longest tenured football coach in Geneva's history, and became the coach with the longest consecutive run with a single team following the retirement of Mars Hill University football coach Tim Clifton at the end of the 2024 season.

On June 30, 2025, it was announced that DeMarco would be stepping down as head coach of the Geneva football team following the conclusion of the 2025 college football season, ending his 33-season run. It was also confirmed he would remain connected to the program in an assistant or advisory role, and that the search for his successor would occur after the season. DeMarco's final game as Geneva head coach was the school's first bowl game since 2009, a 46–10 loss to the SUNY Brockport Golden Eagles. On January 28, 2026, it was announced that Tom Contenta, a member of DeMarco's coaching staff since 2007, would succeed DeMarco as head coach of Geneva College.

== Head coaching record ==
Year	Team	Overall	Conference	Standing	Bowl/playoffs
Geneva Golden Tornadoes (NAIA Division II independent) (1993)
1993	Geneva	4–5			
Geneva Golden Tornadoes (Mid-States Football Association) (1994–2006)
1994	Geneva	6–3	2–2	T–2nd (MEL)	
1995	Geneva	9–2	3–1	2nd (MEL)	
1996	Geneva	7–3	5–1	T–1st (MEL)	
1997	Geneva	11–2	6–0	T–1st (MEL)	L NAIA Quarterfinal
1998	Geneva	8–3	4–2	T–2nd (MEL)	W Victory
1999	Geneva	8–3	5–1	2nd (MEL)	W Victory
2000	Geneva	7–3	3–3	T–3rd (MEL)	
2001	Geneva	4–6	2–4	5th (MEL)	
2002	Geneva	7–5	3–3	4th (MEL)	W Victory
2003	Geneva	7–4	4–2	2nd (MEL)	W Victory
2004	Geneva	5–5	4–3	4th (MEL)	
2005	Geneva	8–4	5–2	T–2nd (MEL)	L NAIA First Round
2006	Geneva	4–5	2–4	5th (MEL)	
Geneva Golden Tornadoes (Presidents' Athletic Conference) (2007–2025)
2007	Geneva	8–3			L Victory
2008	Geneva	5–5			
2009	Geneva	8–3			W Victory
2010	Geneva	5–5			
2011	Geneva	4–6	4–4	T–5th	
2012	Geneva	3–7	3–5	T–5th	
2013	Geneva	5–5	4–4	T–4th	
2014	Geneva	3–7	2–6	10th	
2015	Geneva	2–8	1–7	T–9th	
2016	Geneva	3–7	2–6	T–8th	
2017	Geneva	3–7	2–6	T–6th	
2018	Geneva	2–8	2–7	8th	
2019	Geneva	3–7	3–6	T–7th	
2020–21	Geneva	2–3	1–2	T–6th	
2021	Geneva	4–6	4–5	T–6th	
2022	Geneva	3–7	3–5	T–7th	
2023	Geneva	4–6	4–6	6th	
2024	Geneva	5–5	5–5	6th	
2025	Geneva	6–5	6–2	T–3rd	L Robert M. "Scotty" Whitelaw
Geneva:		173–163	94–104		
Total:		173–163			
National championship Conference title Conference division title or championship game berth
