= Geneva Golden Tornadoes football =

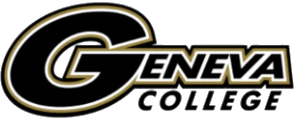
- First season: 1890; 136 years ago
- Head coach: Tom Contenta; 1st season, 0–0 (–)
- Location: Beaver Falls, Pennsylvania
- Stadium: Reeves Field (capacity: 6,500)
- NCAA division: Division III
- League: NCAA and NCCAA
- Conference: PAC
- Colors: Black and Old Gold
- All-time record: 558–535–49 (.510)
- Bowl record: 6–1–0 (.857)

National championships
- Claimed: 5
- Rivalries: Westminster Titans; Waynesburg Yellow Jackets; Grove City Wolverines

Uniforms
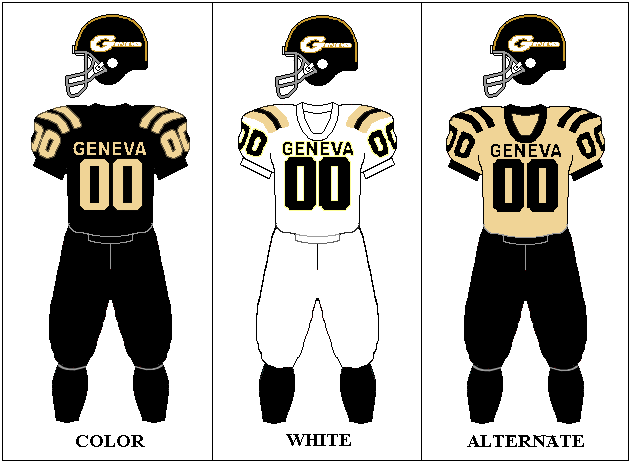
- Website: geneva.edu/football

The Geneva Golden Tornadoes football program represents Geneva College in college football. The team competes in NCAA Division III and is affiliated with the Presidents' Athletic Conference (PAC). The team is also a member of the NCCAA. Since its initial season in 1890, the team has won over 500 games. Home games are currently played at Reeves Field, in Beaver Falls, Pennsylvania. Several Geneva players have received national attention, including Cal Hubbard and Larry Bruno.

== History ==
=== Early years (1890–1925) ===
Geneva College played its first season of football in 1890. The season consisted of one game, where the team played against University of Pittsburgh, then known as the "Western University of Pennsylvania". Geneva lost the game, 10–4. Notably, the game was Pitt's first victory. The following year, Geneva played its first full season of football. The team posted a 4–2 record, defeating the University of Pittsburgh twice (12–4 and 6–4), as well as the students from Pitt Medical. The 1891 team also played its future rival Westminster College, winning the game 42–0. These first teams were coached by Professor William McCracken, who coached the team through the 1896 season. During this period, the team played local teams, including Washington & Jefferson College, Grove City College, Mount Union College, Beaver Falls High School, and West Virginia University.

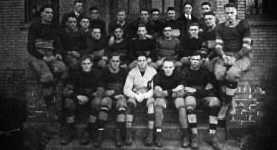
1916 Geneva College Covenaters

In 1900, Samuel G. Craig, often referred to as J. B. Craig, took over as coach, leading the 'Covies' as they were then called to a 5–1–1 record in 1900. Craig coached the team for the next three seasons. In 1902, the Covies posted the first undefeated season in school history, going 7–0. During 1902, the defense surrendered a total of two points the entire season. In 1903, the Craig-led Covies posted an impressive 9–1 record, with their only loss coming to then national-power Washington & Jefferson. This game witnessed one of the most unusual plays in college football history. Losing 6–0 late in the fourth quarter, the Covies ran a reverse which sprung future World War I hero Joe Thompson into the open. As Thompson neared mid-field, a player came off of Washington & Jefferson's bench and tackled Thompson. Fans then swarmed the field, and by the time the playing surface were cleared, the game was called due to darkness. The 6–0 loss was the only game in which Geneva was scored upon all season. After Craig left in 1903, the Covies' success fluctuated, posting several season without a victory. During this time, Geneva frequently played national powers like Penn State, Pitt, Slippery Rock, and West Virginia.

=== Bo McMillin, Cal Hubbard, and decade of success (1925–1935) ===
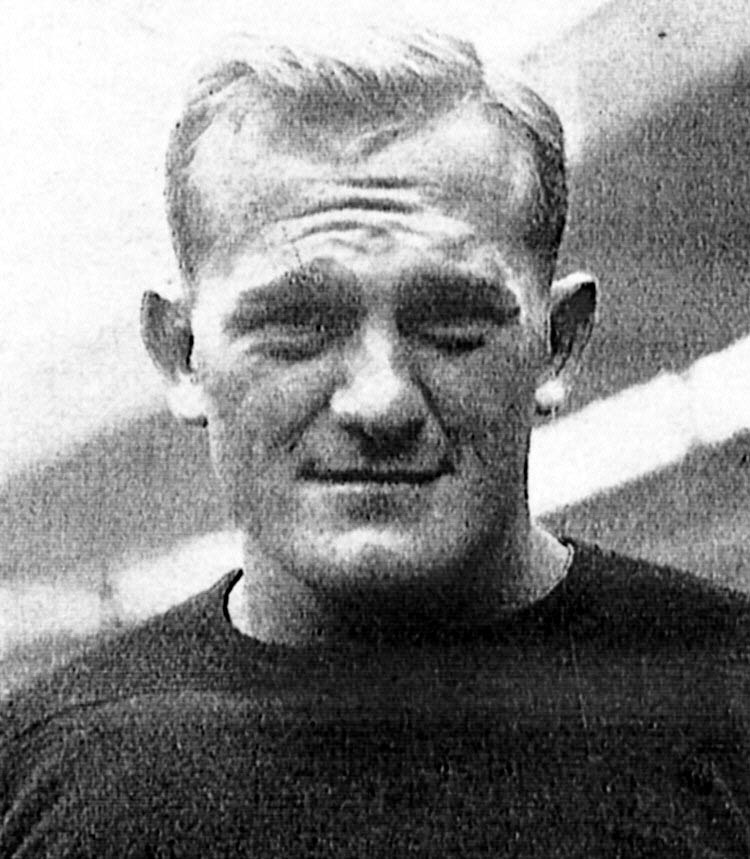
Cal Hubbard, a notable player in 1925–26

Coach Bo McMillin came to Geneva in 1925, and in his first season as coach led the team to a 6–3 record. McMillin was a three-time All-American player at Centre College. He would later go on to coach at the collegiate level at Kansas State University and Indiana University, where he won a Big Ten championship in 1945. Coach McMillin later moved into the professional ranks, as he coached the Philadelphia Eagles and Detroit Lions. Often regarded as one of the best coaches in school history, McMillin scheduled some of the top teams in the country. In 1926, the Covies posted an 8–2 record, including a victory over national power Harvard University, 16–7. Geneva played a post-season game in which it beat Oglethorpe 9–7 in Jacksonville, Florida. Held on New Year's Day at Fairfield Stadium, the "football classic" for the Orange Blossom Festival. The post-season victory cemented Geneva's claim to a championship season.

Geneva was led by standout All-American Cal Hubbard, who was later inducted into the Pro Football Hall of Fame in its initial class in 1963. Hubbard played for the New York Giants, Green Bay Packers, and the Pittsburgh Pirates (to be renamed the Steelers) during his professional career. He was named to the 1920s All-Decade Team and was voted the greatest offensive tackle in the first fifty years of the NFL. Hubbard is the only person to be inducted into both the Pro Football, and the Baseball Hall of Fame. He is also a member of the College Football Hall of Fame, being inducted in 1962. Offensively, the 6'4" Hubbard played tackle for Geneva. On defense, he played end, but lined up off the line of scrimmage in a manner more similar to modern linebacker. Hubbard's number 36 is one of three numbers retired by Geneva College.

In 1927, McMillin led the Covies to another impressive season. The 8–0–1 record included a victory over Boston College. The lone tie was against Bucknell University.

The two seasons after McMillin left Geneva saw the Covies post disappointing records of 5–5 and 2–6–1. In 1930, Howard Harpster took over as head coach of the Covies. Harpster posted records of 9–1 in 1930, 6–2–2 in 1931, and 7–3 in 1932. Harpster's teams earned victories against West Virginia, Marshall University, and Boston University. After an underperforming 1934 season, the 1935 team went 8-1 under second year coach Dwight V. Beede. From 1925 to 1935, Geneva posted a record of 68–31–6 (.647 winning percentage). After the 1935 season, Geneva posted three more winning seasons until the suspension of play for World War II from 1943 to 1945.

=== Post-World War II teams (1946–1960) ===
Geneva College suited its first post-World War II football squad in 1946. The Covies, following an opening day loss to Youngstown, finished the season with seven straight victories. During the win streak, the Geneva defense surrendered a total of nine points. The offense was led by running back Larry Bruno, who went on to earn All-American honors. Bruno was the only Geneva player to officially receive the honor. The following year, Geneva posted a 7–2 record. The 1947 defense was also impressive, pitching six shutouts. After a disappointing 1948 campaign, Geneva earned a 7–2–1 mark in 1949, and an 8–1 record in 1950. The Covies finished out the decade with six additional winning seasons. During the decade, the team was re-nicknamed the Golden Tornadoes.

=== Down years (1960–1986) ===
Between 1960 and 1986, the Geneva College Golden Tornadoes posted only five winning seasons. In 1971, Geneva went 7–2, matching the win total for the previous seven seasons combined. The following year, the 1972 team went 8–1, with the only defeat coming in the last game of the season against rival Westminster. Apart from the '81 and '83 seasons, Geneva failed to achieve another winning season during this period, and finished 12 seasons during the 27 with one win or fewer.

=== Return to success (1987–1992) ===
The 1987 Geneva College Golden Tornadoes, led by coach Gene Sullivan, completed one of the most successful seasons in school history. After a 4–6 record the year before, the Golden Tornadoes went 11–2 and reached the NAIA semi-finals. After finishing the regular season with eight wins, the Golden Tornadoes defeated Bluffton University in the first round of the playoffs at Reeves Field. In the next round, Geneva defeated rival Westminster, 16–15, avenging an earlier season defeat. The Golden Tornadoes then played University of Wisconsin–Stevens Point in the semifinals. The final score was 48–25 Wisconsin–Stevens Point, who went on to win the championship game. However, because of the use of an ineligible player, Wisconsin–Stevens Point was forced to vacate their victories, and Geneva is now credited with a victory.

For the second year in a row, the 1988 Geneva College Golden Tornadoes posted an 8–2 regular-season record. However, Geneva was not awarded a playoff berth. Sullivan led the Golden Tornadoes for four more seasons, going 18–19–1.

=== DeMarco years (1993–2025) ===
Since Geno DeMarco took over the head coaching position, the Golden Tornadoes have enjoyed the longest period of success in school history. The team was frequently ranked in the NAIA top 25, including several top ten and top five rankings. In 1998, the team earned a #1 ranking in the NAIA poll. The team has also played in six Victory Bowl games, an NCCAA record. The team has won the bowl game five times, including their most recent appearance in 2009 Victory Bowl, another NCCAA record.

==== NAIA power (1993–2006) ====
Geno DeMarco took over the Geneva College program in 1993. In his first season as head coach, the school's leader in all-time wins, led Geneva to a 4–5 record. The following year, the Golden Tornadoes improved to 6–3. In 1995, the DeMarco led Golden Tornadoes made it back to NAIA playoffs. After an impressive 9–1 regular season, Geneva fell to Malone University in the first round of the playoffs. Both loses that season came against Malone, and were also by one point. Geneva again lost in the first round of the playoffs in 1996, going 7–3. In 1997, the Golden Tornadoes, following an opening day loss, won eleven straight games, including a win in the first round of the playoffs.

In 1998, Geneva won eight games, including the NCCAA Victory Bowl against Maranatha Baptist Bible College. The 1999 team also posted an 8–3 record and a second victory in the Victory Bowl. A third Victory Bowl was won in 2002, and a fourth in 2003. The 2005 Golden Tornadoes were the last Geneva team to go to the NAIA playoffs. The team finished the regular season 8–3 before losing in the first round against Georgetown College. The 2006 season would be the last Geneva was a member of the NAIA.

==== Geneva joins the PAC (2007–present) ====
In 2007, the team joined the NCAA Division-III as a provisional member of the Presidents' Athletic Conference. The Golden Tornadoes went 8–3 for the season, including several victories over renewed rivals. The team again found a post-season berth in the NCCAA Victory Bowl, but lost to Malone. In 2008, the Golden Tornadoes started off the season slow with a 1–5 record, but went on to win their last four games, including a victory over conference champion Thomas More College. This loss would prove to be the only loss for the Saints in the PAC through the 2010 season. In 2009, the Golden Tornadoes posted an impressive 8–3 record. The team won their first Victory Bowl in six years, in a dramatic fashion. Trailing the entire game, the Golden Tornadoes got the ball deep in their own territory with little more than two minutes remaining. The team marched down the field, including converting a long fourth down, for the game-winning field goal with seconds to spare.

The 2010 Golden Tornadoes again finished their season in dramatic fashion. Geneva battled with rival Westminster through three overtimes, ultimately winning 30–24. Trailing 17–14 late in the fourth quarter, Senior quarterback David Girardi led the Golden Tornadoes to the Westminster 1-yard line. A field goal forced overtime. In the first overtime period, Geneva held Westminster to a long field goal attempt which missed. However, Geneva also missed its field goal as it hit the upright. In the second overtime, Girardi connected on a touchdown pass which was later matched by Westminster. In the third overtime period, the Golden Tornadoes defense again stood strong, forcing a field goal which was blocked. Finally, the Golden Tornadoes won the game on a Gerard Muschette touchdown run. Muschette, who earlier in the game had set the school's career rushing yards record, was stormed by his teammates and carried off the field.

== Alumni and notable players ==
- Larry Bruno
- Melvin Cobbs
- Sam Cooper
- Red Davis
- Reynold Dempsey
- Cal Hubbard
- Gerard Muschette
- Jason Candle

== Head coaches ==
Geneva Co32) and most wins (168). J.B. Craig holds the highest winning percentage at .859. Eight coaches are tied for least seasons at 1 year. Dick Lasse has the lowest winning percentage at .054 and is tied with two others few fewest wins (1). At the end of the 2025 football season, head coach Geno DeMarco stepped down after 33 seasons. Tom Contenta, a New Brighton native and former Geneva College football player, takes over as head coach at the beginning of the 2026 season.

== Tradition ==
=== Rivalries ===
Geneva College has several long-standing rivalries. The school's biggest rival is close neighbor, Westminster College. In football, the schools have been playing games since 1891. As of 2010, the teams have met 113 times, making it one of the longest rivalries in college football. Although Westminster maintains the all-time series lead, Geneva has won 7 of the last 10, dating back to 1994, and since joining the Presidents' Athletic Conference, 3 of the last 4. Other longtime rivalries have been renewed since Geneva joined the PAC. Chief among these rivals are Waynesburg University and Grove City College.

==== Primary rivals ====
The Geneva College Golden Tornadoes' main rivals are the Westminster College Titans. The football teams meet in a contest simply dubbed, "The Game". The teams first met in 1891, and have met a total 113 times, as of 2010. The 2010 version of "The Game" proved to be one of the most dramatic game in the series, as it took Geneva College three overtimes to emerge victorious. Geneva College also has long rivalries with fellow PAC members, Grove City College and Waynesburg University.

Geneva College Golden Tornadoes rivalries: all-time records

Rival game	Opponent	GP	First	Last	W	L	T	%	Streak	Recent wins
The game	Westminster Titans	113	1891	2010	43	62	8	.381	1 win	7 of last 10
	Grove City Wolverines	82	1893	2010	41	34	7	.500	1 loss	2 of last 4
	Waynesburg Yellow Jackets	73	1908	2010	29	40	4	.397	1 loss	2 of last 4

Since Geneva's joining of the Presidents' Athletic Conference in 2007, the Golden Tornadoes have played each of these rivals every season. At times, these rivalries were suspended as Geneva was an NAIA member. However, the teams will meet every year as conference foes.

==== New rivals ====
Geneva College is well on its way to making new rivals with conference opponent St. Vincent's College. The St. Vincent Bearcats joined the Presidents' Athletic Conference a season prior to Geneva. Thus, both teams shared the 'provisional member' status for the 2007 to 2009 seasons. In 2009, the teams agreed to play a second game, outside of the normal conference match. Although Geneva has dominated the series (5–0) since 2007, the Golden Tornadoes and Bearcats have participated in close, physical games, which could lead to a full-fledge rivalry as both teams become full PAC members.

==== Lost rivalries ====
- Allegheny Gators

The Gators and the Geneva College 'Covies' first met in 1899, and have played 43 games. The rivalry got off to a quick start, with the teams meeting 15 times in the first ten seasons. Geneva leads the all-time series 41–17–4. The teams have not met since 1979.

- Duquesne Dukes

The Golden Tornadoes met the Duquesne Dukes 31 times, with the first game in 1897. The teams played frequently in the 1920s and early '30s. The rivalry was renewed in the 1980s where the teams met for 11 straight seasons, with Geneva winning 6 games. The teams have not played each other since 1990. Geneva holds the all-time series lead 19–12.

- Pittsburgh Panthers

Geneva's first opponent was also their first rival. Pitt maintains the series led 16–10 over the Golden Tornadoes. All of the games between the two schools took place between 1890 and 1924. The teams met three times in 1891, with Geneva winning the series 2–1.

== Season-by-season results ==
=== Post-season bowl appearances ===
Geneva College has appeared in seven post season bowl games. The Golden Tornadoes have had good success, going 6–2 all-time in bowl games. The Golden Tornadoes have also declined two bowl invitations, those being the 2000 Victory Bowl and the 2007 ECAC Bowl.

Geneva College bowl appearances
Date	Bowl game	Opponent	H/A	Score	Stadium	Location
Jan. 1, 1927	Orange Blossom Classic	Oglethorpe	H	9–7	Fairfield Stadium (Note: Neutral venue.)	Jacksonville, FL
1998	Victory Bowl	Maranatha Baptist	H	27–6	Fawcett Stadium	Canton, OH
1999	Victory Bowl	MidAmerica Nazarene	H	31–26	Fawcett Stadium	Canton, OH
2002	Victory Bowl	Northwestern (MN)	A	19–9	Humphrey Metrodome	Minneapolis, MN
2003	Victory Bowl	North Greenville	H	37–14	Reeves Field	Beaver Falls, PA
2007	Victory Bowl	Malone	H	17–45	Reeves Field	Beaver Falls, PA
2009	Victory Bowl	Greenville	A	29–28	Francis Field	Greenville, IL
2025	ECAC Robert M. "Scotty" Whitelaw Bowl	Brockport	A	10–46	Eunice Kennedy Shriver Stadium	Brockport, NY

=== Post-season playoff appearances ===
Prior to joining NCAA Division III, Geneva College competed in eight NAIA playoff games, finishing with a record of 4–4 (including a forfeit victory) and reaching the national semi-finals in 1987. The Golden Tornadoes joined the Presidents' Athletic Conference in 2007 and had to undergo a four-year provisional period, where they were ineligible for the NCAA Division III playoffs and conference awards. In 2007, the Golden Tornadoes would have finished second in the PAC, with a 7–1 record against PAC opponents. Had they not been provisional members, the Golden Tornadoes might have qualified for the NCAA Division III playoffs.

Geneva College playoff games
Season	Playoff game	Rival	Score
1987	NAIA Div. II – first round	Bluffton	16–13
1987	NAIA Div. II – second round	Westminster (PA)	16–15
1987	NAIA Div. II – semifinals	Wisconsin–Stevens Point	25–48 (Note: Wisconsin–Stevens Point forfeited the victory for use of an ineligible player.)
1995	NAIA Div. II – first round	Malone	23–24
1996	NAIA Div. II – first round	Findlay	13–38
1997	NAIA – first round	Campbellsville	34–13
1997	NAIA – second round	Findlay	7–28
2005	NAIA – first round	Georgetown (KY)	35–36

== Records ==
=== Career records ===
==== Passing ====
Passing yards
Name	Yards	Years
Justin Myers	8,446	1995–99
Rich McClellan	7,547	1993–96
Jamie Smith	7,226	1984–87
Ben Swallow	7,041	2000–03
Justin Sciarro	6,501	2002–06

Passing touchdowns
Name	Touchdowns	Years
Justin Myers	79	1995–99
Jamie Smith	62	1984–87
Rich McClellan	56	1993–96
Justin Sciarro	47	2002–06
Ben Swallow	46	2000–03

Completion percentage
Name	Perc (comps/att)	Years
Justin Myers	.579 (554–1046)	1995–99
Rich McClellan	.576 (537–932)	1993–96
Joe DeNone	.564 (197–349)	1958–60
David Girardi	.563 (334–593)	2007–09
Ben Swallow	.558 (554–993)	2000–03

==== Rushing ====
Rushing yards
Name	Yards	Years
Melvin Cobbs	3,809	1997–99
Willie Murray	3,622	1994–96
Kenneth Walker	3,359	2001–04

Rushing average
Name	Yards/rush	Years
Willie Murray	5.4	1994–96
Boobie Miles	5.0	2001–04

==== Receiving ====
Receptions
Name	Receptions	Years
Marko Thomas	215	1999–02
Ron Michel	170	1994–97
Mike Holaren	147	1995–98
Jeff Beltz	142	1991–94
Aaron Price	142	2000–02

Touchdown receptions
Name	Touchdowns	Years
Marko Thomas	36	1999–02
Mike Holaren	30	1995–98
Ron Michel	23	1994–97
Jeff Beltz	30	1991–94
Tom Kross	20	1985–88

Receiving yards
Name	Yards	Years
Marko Thomas	3,515	1999–02
Mike Holaren	2,939	1995–98
Ron Michel	2,918	1994–97
Jeff Beltz	2,130	1991–94
Tom Kross	1,956	1985–88
