= Ranger Oil Boom =

Coordinates: 32.4504°N 98.6928°W

Ranger Oil Strike
- Date: October 17, 1917
- Location: 1313 S. Commerce Street, Ranger, Texas

The Ranger Oil Boom started on October 17, 1917, after oil was discovered 3,342 feet (1,019 m) below ground at the J.H. McCleskey No. 1 drill well in Ranger, Texas. The strike was notable because Soviet Russia's threatened exit from World War I meant its oil output was lost to the Allies. Before WWI Russia accounted for 30% of the world's oil production, more than any other country. On December 15, 1917, an armistice between Soviet Russia and the Central Powers was concluded. According to a story from USA Today, the oil from the Ranger Oil Strike helped win World War I.

== Discovery ==
William Knox Gordon made his fortune with the Texas and Pacific Coal Company in Thurber, Texas. It drilled a gas well north of Ranger in August 1917, after town civic leaders offered acreage in return for four test wells. On October 17, 1917 the J.H. McCleskey No. 1 oil well a mile southwest of Ranger produced oil at 1200 barrels per day from the Strawn Formation sandstones at 1,300 to 2,000 feet (400 to 610 m), the Smithwick Shale, and the Marble Falls Formation limestone at 3,200 to 3,400 feet (980 to 1,040 m) feet. The Ranger Oil Field production peaked in July 1919 at 80,000 barrels per day. The oil boom brought many seeking jobs, including farm boys and demobilized veterans.

== Aftermath ==
The oil from the reservoir was soon drained and the region's oil boom ended. The J.H. McCleskey No. 1 was abandoned on May 30, 1930.

== Bibliography ==
Notes

References

- Erdrich, Ronald W. (October 30, 2017). "Roaring Ranger Oil Boom Museum celebrates 100 years of well". Associated Press.
- Hinton, Diana Davids; Olien, Roger M. (2002). Oil in Texas: The Gusher Age, 1895-1945. University of Texas Press. ISBN 9780292778863. - Total pages: 320
- Ptitsyn, Alexander (September 27, 2017). "Black gold: How the Russian oil industry was born". Russia Beyond.
- Reeves, Frank (1922). "Geology of the Ranger Oil Field, Texas, in Contributions to Economic Geology, Part II" (PDF). USGS: 111–170.
- USA Today (October 13, 2017). "Abilene, Big Country briefs".
- Wills, Matthew (January 9, 2017). "Russia was the first source of white oil, a Vaseline-like mix of hydrocarbons used in pharmaceutical, cosmetics, and plastics". Jstor Daily.[
