= 1934–35 NCAA football bowl games =

College football postseason game series

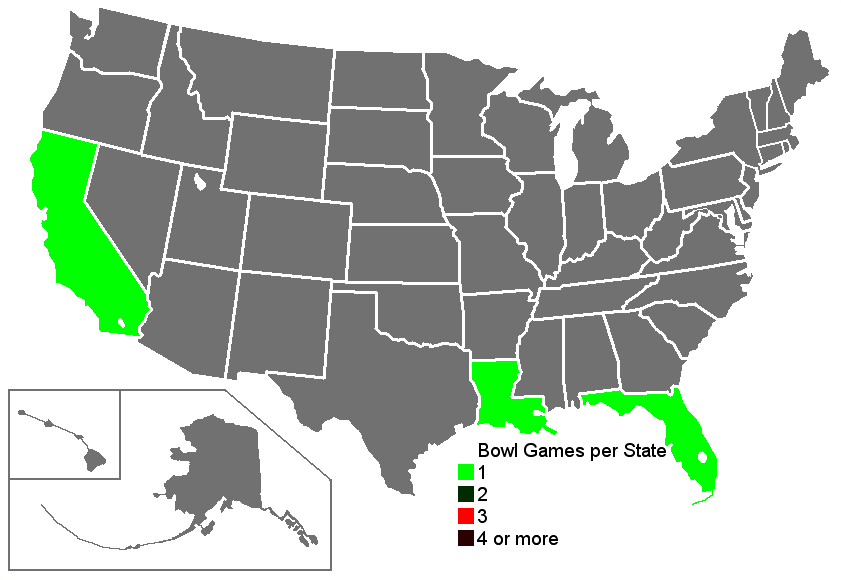
- Number of bowl games per state
- Season: 1934
- Regular season: September 22–December 1
- Number of bowls: 3
- All-star games: East–West Shrine Game
- Bowl games: January 1, 1935
- Champions: Minnesota Golden Gophers (Dickinson); Alabama Crimson Tide (Dunkel)
Bowl record by conference
Conference	Bowls	Record	Final AP poll
Independents	3	1–2 (0.333)	5
SEC	2	2–0 (1.000)	1
Pacific Coast	1	0–1 (0.000)	1
Big Six	0	0–0 (–)	0
Big Ten	0	0–0 (–)	3
Border	0	0–0 (–)	0
Rocky Mountain	0	0–0 (–)	0
Southern	0	0–0 (–)	0
SWC	0	0–0 (–)	0

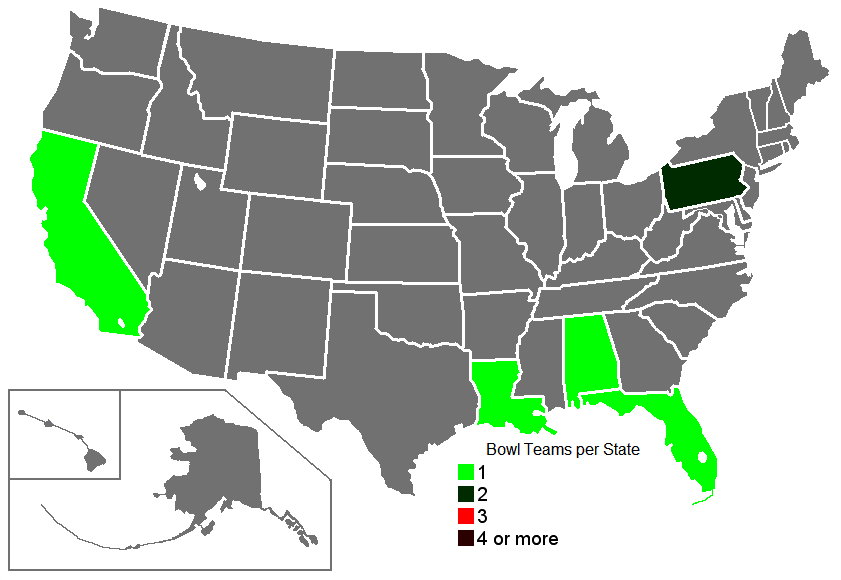
Number of bowl teams per state.

The 1934–35 NCAA football bowl games were the final games of the National Collegiate Athletic Association (NCAA) 1934 college football season, and featured the debut of the Sugar Bowl and the Orange Bowl, which complemented the only previous annual post-season game, the Rose Bowl. The Sun Bowl was also played for the first time, but with non-collegiate teams.

The Orange Bowl was hosted by the local team, the Miami Hurricanes, who faced the invited Bucknell Bison. Likewise, the Sugar Bowl was also hosted by the in-town team (the Tulane Green Wave), and also invited a Pennsylvania club as their opponents, the Temple Owls. The Rose Bowl featured two national powerhouses, the Stanford Indians of the West and the Alabama Crimson Tide from the South. Alabama's victory sealed their undefeated season and ended Stanford's, leaving Minnesota the only other undefeated team in the US.

== Poll rankings ==
The first AP poll for college football was taken in mid-November 1934; it did not become a regular occurrence until the 1936 season. The below table lists top teams, their win–loss records at the time the poll was taken, and the bowls they later played in. Contemporary polls later named different national champions; the Dickinson System chose Minnesota, while the Dunkel System selected Alabama.

AP	Team	W–L	Conf.	Bowl
1	Minnesota Golden Gophers	6–0	Big Ten	— †
2	Stanford Indians	7–0–1	PCC	Rose Bowl
3	Alabama Crimson Tide	7–0	SEC	Rose Bowl
4	Pittsburgh Panthers	6–1	Ind.	—
5	Princeton Tigers	6–0	Ind.	—
6	Illinois Fighting Illini	6–0	Big Ten	— †
7	Navy Midshipmen	7–0	Ind.	—
8	Colgate Red Raiders	4–1	Ind.	—
9	Ohio State Buckeyes	5–1	Big Ten	— †
10	Syracuse Orangemen	6–0	Ind.	—

† The Big Ten Conference did not allow its members to participate in bowl games until the 1947 Rose Bowl.

== Bowl schedule ==
Date	Game	Site	Teams	Affiliations	Results
Jan. 1	Rose Bowl	Rose Bowl; Pasadena, California	Alabama Crimson Tide (9–0); Stanford Indians (9–0–1)	SEC; PCC	Alabama 29; Stanford 13
Jan. 1	Sugar Bowl	Tulane Stadium; New Orleans, Louisiana	Tulane Green Wave (9–1); Temple Owls (7–0–1)	SEC; Independent	Tulane 20; Temple 14
Jan. 1	Orange Bowl	Miami Field; Miami, Florida	Bucknell Bison (7–2–2); Miami Hurricanes (5–2–1)	Independent; Independent	Bucknell 26; Miami 0
Jan. 1	Sun Bowl	Jones Stadium; El Paso, Texas	El Paso All-Stars (N/A); Ranger Bulldogs (5–1)	†	El Paso 25; Ranger 21

† The inaugural Sun Bowl was contested between high school teams.

=== Conference performance in bowl games ===
Conference	Games	Record			Bowls	
Conference	Games	W	L	Pct.	Won	Lost
Independents	3	1	2	.333	Orange	Orange, Sugar
SEC	2	2	0	1.000	Rose, Sugar	—
Pacific Coast	1	0	1	.000	—	Rose

== Game recaps ==
=== Rose Bowl ===
	1	2	3	4	Total
Alabama	0	22	0	7	29
Stanford	7	0	6	0	13

Qtr.	Team	Scoring play	Score
1	STAN	Grayson 1 yard rush, Moscrip kick good	STAN 7–0
2	BAMA	Howell 5 yard rush, kick failed	STAN 7–6
2	BAMA	Smith 27 yard FG	BAMA 9–7
2	BAMA	Howell 67 yard rush, Smith kick good	BAMA 16–7
2	BAMA	Huston 46 yard pass from Riley, kick failed	BAMA 22–7
3	STAN	VanDellen 12 yard rush	BAMA 22–13
4	BAMA	Huston 59 yard pass from Howell, Smith kick good	BAMA 29–13

=== Sugar Bowl ===
	1	2	3	4	Total
Tulane	0	7	7	6	20
Temple	7	7	0	0	14

Qtr.	Team	Scoring play	Score
1	TEM	Tester 7 yard pass from Smukler, Smukler kick good	TEM 7–0
2	TEM	Smukler 3 yard rush, Smukler kick good	TEM 14–0
2	TUL	Simons 85 yard kickoff return, Mintz kick good	TEM 14–7
3	TUL	Hardy 11 yard pass from Bryan, Mintz kick good	TIED 14–14
4	TUL	Hardy 25 yard pass from Mintz, kick failed	TUL 20–14

=== Orange Bowl ===
	1	2	3	4	Total
Bucknell	0	7	6	13	26
Miami (FL)	0	0	0	0	0

Qtr.	Team	Scoring play	Score
2	BUCK	Smith 23 yard pass from Jenkins, Dobie kick good	BUCK 7–0
3	BUCK	Miller 4 yard rush, kick failed	BUCK 13–0
4	BUCK	Smith 8 yard rush, Dobie kick good	BUCK 20–0
4	BUCK	Reznichak 10 yard rush, kick failed	BUCK 26–0

== See also ==
- Prairie View Bowl
