= Ellis Burks Field =

Baseball venue in Ranger, Texas, US

- Interactive map of Ellis Burks Field
- Full name: Ellis Burks Field
- Location: Ranger, Texas
- Coordinates: 32.45367°N 98.6842°W
- Capacity: 1,500
- Field size: 345 LF; 400 CF; 345 RF

Construction
- Opened: 1999

Tenant
- Ranger College Rangers

Ellis Burks Field is a baseball venue located in Ranger, Texas, and the home of the Ranger College Rangers baseball team. The facility was named after former MLB outfielder Ellis Burks who helped with the funding of the construction of the ballpark. The field is located in the southern section of the Ranger College campus.
