= 1935 Sun Bowl =

American college football game

- Inaugural Sun Bowl
El Paso All-Stars	Ranger Bulldogs
(N/A)	(5–1)
25	21
Head coach: Mack Saxon & Harry Phillips	Head coach: Ottis "Red" Moore
	1	2	3	4	Total
El Paso	6	0	19	0	25
Ranger	0	7	0	14	21
- Date: January 1, 1935
- Season: 1934
- Stadium: Jones Stadium
- Location: El Paso, Texas
- Referee: Bob Carson
- Attendance: 3,000

The 1935 Sun Bowl was the inaugural edition of the Sun Bowl, an American football postseason bowl game. Played on New Year's Day of 1935, the game featured high school teams and was sponsored by the El Paso Kiwanis club. The following year's game, the 1936 edition, was the first Sun Bowl matchup between college football teams. The game has been held annually in El Paso, Texas, from 1935 to the present.

== Teams ==
The El Paso All-Stars started practice in mid-December with players from the Austin, Bowie, Cathedral, and El Paso High Schools. Selected as their opponent were the Bulldogs of Ranger High School in Ranger, Texas. Ranger entered the Sun Bowl with a 5–1 record, having defeated Breckenridge High School for their district championship when both teams were 4–0, then losing to Amarillo High School in a state playoff game.

The El Paso team was co-coached by Mack Saxon, head coach of the Texas Mines Miners (now the UTEP Miners), and Harry Phillips, who had been a running back for the Texas Longhorns in the late 1920s. The Ranger team was coached by Ottis "Red" Moore.

== Game summary ==
=== Scoring summary ===
Scoring summary

Quarter	Time	Drive			Team	Scoring information	Score	
Quarter	Time	Plays	Yards	TOP	Team	Scoring information	EPAS	RNGR
1					EPAS	Gilberto Salcedo 65-yard touchdown reception from Ken Heineman, Heineman kick no good	6	0
2					RNGR	Rankin Britt 45-yard touchdown run, Aaron Anderson kick good	6	7
3					EPAS	Heineman 7-yard touchdown run, Armando Cisneros kick no good	12	7
3					EPAS	George Crysler 30-yard touchdown reception from Heineman, Heineman kick good	19	7
3					EPAS	Interception returned 70 yards for touchdown by Heineman, Cisneros kick no good	25	7
4					RNGR	Anderson 1-yard touchdown run, Anderson kick good	25	14
4					RNGR	Anderson 3-yard touchdown run, Anderson kick good	25	21
"TOP" = time of possession. For other American football terms, see Glossary of American football.							25	21

=== Statistics ===
	1	2	3	4	Total
All-Stars	6	0	19	0	25
Bulldogs	0	7	0	14	21

Statistics	El Paso	Ranger
First downs	10	8
Rushing yards	145	166
Passing yards	212	58
Passing: Comp–Att–Int	9–22–3	6–18–2
Fumbles: Total–Lost	3–1	1–1
Penalties: Number–Yards	3–15	2–10
