= Ranger Independent School District =

School district in Texas

Ranger Independent School District is a public school district based in Ranger, Texas, United States. Located mostly in Eastland County, a small portion of the district extends into Stephens County.

== Schools ==
Ranger ISD has three campuses - Ranger High School (grades 9-12), Ranger Middle School (grades 6-8), and Ranger Elementary School (prkindergarten-grade 5).

Ranger College was part of the district until 1950, when it became a separate community college entity.

Walter Prescott Webb (1888-1963), historian of the American West and author of the classic The Great Plains (1931), graduated from Ranger High School around 1905.

In 2009, the school district was rated "academically acceptable" by the Texas Education Agency.
