= National Register of Historic Places listings in Erath County, Texas =

Location of Erath County in Texas

This is a list of the National Register of Historic Places listings in Erath County, Texas.

This is intended to be a complete list of properties and districts listed on the National Register of Historic Places in Erath County, Texas. There are one district and five individual properties listed on the National Register in the county. Four properties are also Recorded Texas Historic Landmarks including one State Antiquities Landmark.

This National Park Service list is complete through NPS recent listings posted March 21, 2025.

== Current listings ==
The locations of National Register properties and districts may be seen in a mapping service provided.

	Name on the Register	Image	Date listed	Location	City or town	Description
1	Berry House	Berry House	May 15, 1980 (#80004116)	525 E. Washington St. 32°13′19″N 98°11′57″W	Stephenville	Recorded Texas Historic Landmark
2	Bluff Dale Bridge	Bluff Dale Bridge	December 20, 1977 (#77001440)	County Road 149 (Berry's Creek Rd.) at the Paluxy River; 32°21′14″N 98°01′34″W	Bluff Dale	
3	Erath County Courthouse	Erath County Courthouse	August 18, 1977 (#77001441)	Public Sq. 32°13′12″N 98°12′07″W	Stephenville	State Antiquities Landmark, Recorded Texas Historic Landmark
4	Erath Memorial Arch	Erath Memorial Arch	April 19, 2018 (#100002348)	N Erath Ave. & W Washington St. 32°13′08″N 98°12′21″W	Stephenville	
5	First National Bank Building	First National Bank Building	July 21, 2015 (#15000450)	198 S. Belknap St. 32°13′11″N 98°12′10″W	Stephenville	Recorded Texas Historic Landmark
6	Stephenville Downtown Historic District	Stephenville Downtown Historic District	April 23, 2018 (#10002349)	Roughly bounded by McNeil, & Tarleton Sts., Barton & Devine Aves. 32°13′14″N 98°12′10″W	Stephenville	
7	Thurber Historic District	Thurber Historic District	August 17, 1979 (#79002936)	South of Thurber; 32°29′57″N 98°25′54″W	Thurber	
8	Wyatt-Hickie Ranch Complex		December 26, 1985 (#85003162)	Off US 281 northwest of FM 913; 32°08′39″N 98°09′08″W	Stephenville	Recorded Texas Historic Landmark

== See also ==
- National Register of Historic Places listings in Texas
- Recorded Texas Historic Landmarks in Erath County
