= Johnny Lucadello =

American baseball player (1919-2001)

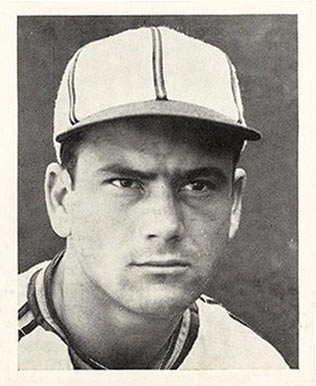
- Second baseman
- Born: February 22, 1919; Thurber, Texas, U.S.
- Died: October 30, 2001 (aged 82); San Antonio, Texas, U.S.
- Batted: Right Threw: Right

MLB debut
- September 24, 1938, for the St. Louis Browns

Last MLB appearance
- June 13, 1947, for the New York Yankees

MLB statistics
- Batting average: .264
- Home runs: 5
- Runs batted in: 60
- Stats at Baseball Reference

Teams
- St. Louis Browns (1938–1941, 1946); New York Yankees (1947)

John Lucadello (February 22, 1919 – October 30, 2001) was an American professional baseball player. Primarily a second baseman, he appeared in 239 Major League games for the St. Louis Browns (1938–1941; 1946) and New York Yankees (1947). The 5 ft 11 in (1.80 m), 160 lb (73 kg) native of Thurber, Texas, threw and batted right-handed. He served in the United States Navy during World War II. He was the brother of longtime MLB scout Tony Lucadello.

Johnny Lucadello's pro career lasted from 1936 to 1955, with four seasons (1942–1945) missed because of his wartime service. In six Major League seasons, he had 686 at bats, 95 runs scored, 181 hits, 36 doubles, 7 triples, and 5 home runs. He had 60 RBIs, 6 stolen bases, 93 walks, a .264 batting average, a .353 on-base percentage, a .359 slugging percentage, 246 total bases and 5 sacrifice hits.

He died in San Antonio, Texas at the age of 82.
