= Tony Lucadello =

American baseball scout (1912–1989)

- Born: July 30, 1912; Thurber, Texas, U.S.
- Died: May 8, 1989 (aged 76); Fostoria, Ohio, U.S.
- Occupation: Baseball scout
- Spouse: Virginia Lucadello

Anthony Lucadello (July 30, 1912 – May 8, 1989) was an American professional baseball scout for the Chicago Cubs (1943–1957) and Philadelphia Phillies (1957–1989). During his career, he signed a total of 52 players who made it to the Major Leagues, most notably Hall of Famers Ferguson Jenkins and Mike Schmidt. His total number of Major League signings is considered to be unsurpassed, and some have called him perhaps the greatest scout ever.

== Early life ==
Lucadello was born in Thurber, Texas, to native Italian parents, but grew up in Chicago, Illinois, where his family moved so his father could work in the area's coal mines.

== From player to scout ==
In 1936, Branch Rickey established a new Class D team – the Fostoria Redbirds – in Fostoria, Ohio, as part of the St. Louis Cardinals system and the Ohio State League. Lucadello travelled to Fostoria to try out for the team and ended up spending two years as a shortstop and player-manager in the league with the Redbirds and the Tiffin Mud Hens. Never a major league prospect as a player, Lucadello eventually took a factory job with the Fostoria Screw Company, met his future wife and settled down.

In 1942, however, he returned to baseball as a part-time scout for the Chicago Cubs. He began running tryout camps, assembling teams and borrowing equipment to outfit them, and playing his finds against some of the best amateur talent in the Midwest. He was offered his first full-time scouting position by Cubs owner Philip K. Wrigley after bringing two pitchers in two years to the attention of Cubs manager Charlie Grimm who were signed immediately to the Major League roster. After seeing the second pitcher, Bob Rush, throwing at a tryout at Wrigley Field, Wrigley told Grimm, "Before you sign this pitcher here, if you want him that bad, you better sign that young man right there," and pointed at Lucadello. As he left Grimm's office, Wrigley said of Lucadello, "This young man was born to be a scout".

== Scouting fundamentals ==
Lucadello worked without a radar gun or stopwatch and believed in dubious but unimpeachable homespun theories, such as the idea not to sign any players who wore glasses.

Unlike nearly all other scouts, Lucadello almost never watched a game from behind home plate. Rather, he moved from place to place around the field: a short way up the baseline (to see the batter's face), behind first or third base (to judge the arm strength of both infielders and outfielders), and halfway up the line (to watch pitchers).

Lucadello claimed that the key to identifying a prospect was to focus on the player's body control and footwork, saying, "Eighty-seven percent of the game of baseball is played below the waist."

The four kinds of scouts, according to Lucadello, start with the letter 'P':

- Poor: wastes time looking for games rather than having a planned itinerary
- Picker: emphasizes a player's one weakness to the neglect of all strengths
- Performance: bases his evaluation on what a player does in his presence
- Projector: envisions what a player will be able to do in two or three years.

He estimated that five percent of scouts were poor, five percent pickers, 85 percent performance scouts and five percent projectors.

Lucadello's credentials as a "projector" were most clearly demonstrated in his vision for Hall of Fame third baseman Mike Schmidt. As a high school senior with two bad knees, Schmidt hit only .179 with one home run, but Lucadello had been watching him since Little League and still saw his potential. "I felt...that Mike was a late bloomer", he explained years later. He tried to keep his interest in Schmidt from other scouts by hiding behind dugouts or bushes or watching from a nearby rooftop. "I watched one game from the back of a station wagon in the parking lot", Lucadello said. According to Schmidt, "Without Tony Lucadello, I wouldn't have been a Philadelphia Phillie. He scouted me from the time I played Little League Baseball all the way up through high school and college. He had me followed when a lot of other scouts had kind of written me off".

=== The Lucadello plan ===
Like many scouts, Lucadello believed that modern players were weak in the fundamentals of the game. In 1987, Lucadello told The Chicago Tribune that players were no longer developing in the United States because athletes were no longer growing up learning the game on sandlots.

For many years he had proposed that young players could constantly improve their skills by using concrete walls to work on their arms and take ground balls at the same time, with or without supervision, similar to the way young basketball players spent hour after hour shooting at a basket. With the help of some high school coaches who worked as part-time scouts for him, he developed and published a series of training drills using the walls in a booklet called "The Lucadello Plan" that he believed could help change the game.

In 1984, American League president Dr. Bobby Brown, also believing the game's skills were in decline among its young players, began seeking a low-level way to reverse the trend. Among the ideas he received from major league baseball scouts was Lucadello's description of his "plan." With encouragement from former Phillies manager Dallas Green, who had seen clinics run by Lucadello in Puerto Rico, Major League Baseball created an instructional video in 1987 called, "A Coaching Clinic," that demonstrated the drills. Orders for the video came from all over the world, and it was given to officials from the former Soviet Union who visited spring training in 1988 in preparation for the creation of an Olympic team.

The Lucadello Plan lists six rules for young players to follow to maximize the benefit of practicing with the wall:

1. Learn to position your feet for ground balls
2. Keep your head and glove down
3. Grip the ball across the seams
4. Throw with a strong, over-the-top delivery
5. Take 100 grounders off the wall every day
6. Play with enthusiasm

== Major League signees ==
In the early 1940s, scouting for the Chicago Cubs, Lucadello covered nine states and parts of Canada, logging some 70,000 miles a year in his car. In his later years, with the Phillies, he concentrated on Michigan, Indiana and Ohio, his home state, spreading the gospel of the game to promising young athletes.

Lucadello claimed, along with many of the coaches and part-time scouts he worked with, that his success in signing players was due largely to the close relationship he built with prospects and their families while he scouted them, sometimes over a number of years.

“He would sell what it’s like and explain it all and really educate you about the minor leagues,” said Steve Phillips, the former Mets general manager, who was scouted by Lucadello as an amateur player in Detroit. “The number of times he must have done that in his life — to go into those homes and have the exact same conversation — but he made it fresh, he made it real.”

Lucadello would write regular letters to his signees as they made their way in the pros. His network of part-time scouts gave him tips on players to follow.

Ferguson Jenkins said, "I signed with the Phils because they had worked with me for three years...and 'cause I became real good friends with Tony Lucadello. He came down every weekend to watch me play."

In one case, Lucadello was able to sign a player who had offers of at least $100,000 from seven other teams while all Lucadello could offer from the Cubs was $4,000. Lucadello had been watching the player, Dick Drott, since he was fifteen. On the night of Drott's graduation, the earliest time he could sign a high school player, Lucadello, Drott and both of his parents were in tears about their decision when the mother said, "I don't want the money....Over my dead body is my boy going to sign with anyone but Tony."

These are the Major League players who were originally signed by Tony Lucadello (by ML debut date):

For the Chicago Cubs (Note: * All-Star, + Hall of Fame):

- Johnny Lucadello
- Hank Edwards
- Ed Hanyzewski
- Russ Kerns
- Bob Rush *
- Wayne Terwilliger
- Harry Chiti
- Bob Kelly
- Fred Richards
- Don Elston *
- Duke Simpson
- Jim Brosnan
- Bob Speake
- Bob Anderson
- Dick Drott
- Eddie Haas
- Gordon Massa
- Gene Fodge
- Footer Johnson
- Don Eaddy
- Ed Donnelly
- John Goetz
- Lou Johnson

For the Philadelphia Phillies (Note: * All-Star, + Hall of Fame):

- George Williams
- John Herrnstein
- Alex Johnson * (1970 American League Batting champion)
- Grant Jackson *
- Ferguson Jenkins *+ (1971 National League Cy Young Award winner)
- Billy Sorrell
- Terry Harmon
- Clarence Jones
- Mike Marshall * (1974 National League Cy Young Award winner)
- John Upham
- Larry Hisle *
- Steve Arlin
- Toby Harrah *
- Dave Roberts
- Mike Schmidt *+ (1980, 1981, 1986 National League Most Valuable Player; All-Century Team)
- Larry Cox
- Jim Essian
- Tom Underwood
- Dyar Miller
- Bill Nahorodny
- Fred Andrews
- Barry Bonnell
- Todd Cruz
- Scott Munninghoff
- Len Matuszek
- Scott Service
- Mickey Morandini *
- Tom Marsh

== Awards ==
Lucadello was inducted into the All Sports Hall of Fame in Chicago in 1976. He was named "Midwest Scout of the Year" by The Scout of the Year Foundation in 1986. He was inducted into the Ohio Baseball Hall of Fame in 1989.

== Death ==
In the spring of 1989, at the age of 76, Lucadello was told by the Phillies that the '89 draft would be his last for them. Apparently unable to cope with the impending loss of his work – "the fear of not being wanted," Mike Schmidt called it – Lucadello died a suicide from a gunshot wound to the head on May 8, 1989, on a baseball field in Fostoria. Lucadello was found by the local high school baseball team, who found him lying on the ground shortly after he had shot himself. The team knocked on neighborhood doors to call 911. After the ambulance took Lucadello away, the team resumed practice. The field, now named for Lucadello, features a monument honoring the former scout as "Baseball's Friend".

== Sources ==
- Dolson, Frank (10 May 1989). "This Scout Was Truly Great At Judging A Player's Heart". The Philadelphia Inquirer. p. 11.
- Golenbock, Peter (1996). Wrigleyville: A Magical History Tour of the Chicago Cubs. St. Martin's Press. ISBN 0-312-14079-7.
- Hanneman, David (1989). Diamonds in the Rough: The Legend and Legacy of Tony Lucadello, One of Baseball's Greatest Scouts. Diamond Books. ISBN 0-89015-666-2.
- Jordan, David M. (2002). Occasional Glory: The History of the Philadelphia Phillies. McFarland & Company. ISBN 0786483741.
- Robbins, Mike (2004). Ninety Feet from Fame: Close Calls With Baseball Immortality. Carroll & Graf Publishers. ISBN 0-7867-1335-6.
- Searcy, Jay (1 June 1989). "Few Saw The Potential: It Took a Persistent Scout, A Family Who Believed and An Invisible Force". The Philadelphia Inquirer. p. 12-G.
- Spivak, Jeffrey (2005). Crowning the Kansas City Royals: Remembering the 1985 World Series Champs. Sports Publishing LLC. ISBN 1-58261-826-7.
- Winegardner, Mark (1990). Prophet of the Sandlots: Journeys with a Major League Scout. Prentice Hall Press. ISBN 0-13-726373-2.
