= Ranger College =

Community college in Ranger, Texas, U.S.

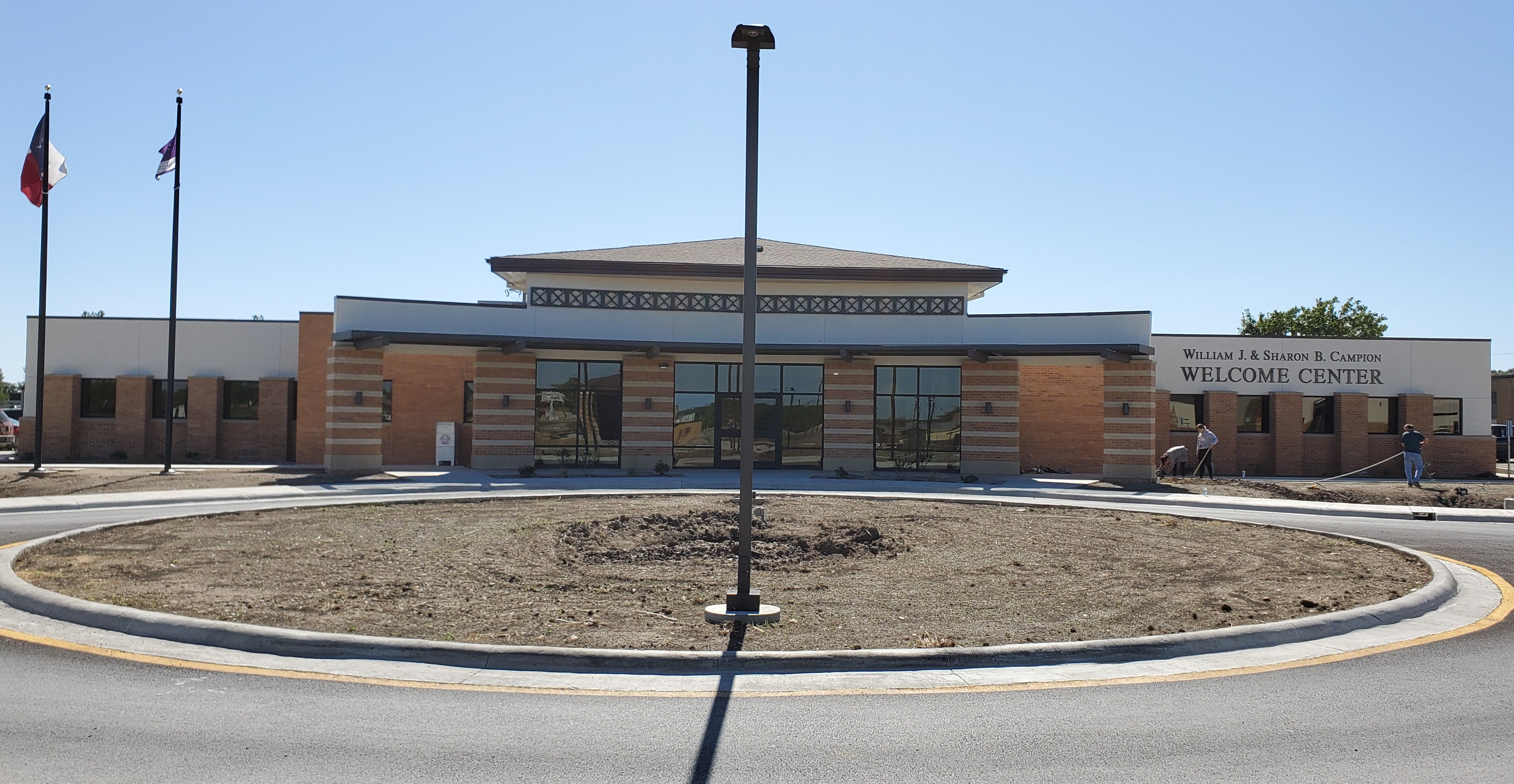
- The William and Sharon Campion Welcome Center
- Type: Public community college
- Established: 1926
- President: Dr. Derrick Worrels
- Undergraduates: 2544 (as of Fall 2024)
- Location: Ranger, Texas, United States; 32.458814°N 98.682502°W
- Campus: Rural, 50 acres (20 ha)
- Colors: Purple and white
- Nickname: Rangers
- Website: rangercollege.edu

Ranger College is a public community college in Ranger, Texas. The college's website asserts that it "is one of the oldest public two-year colleges in continuous operation in the state of Texas." In conjunction with its main campus in Ranger, the college maintains several satellite campuses across Erath County and Brown County, Texas. Ranger College provides dual-credit courses to over 40 area school districts.

As defined by the Texas State Legislature, the official service area of Ranger College is the part of the Ranger Independent School District located in Eastland County, excluding the area known as the "old Bullock School Land", and all of Brown, Comanche, Erath, and Young counties, excluding the portion of the Graham Independent School District located in Young County. Ranger College is a Hispanic Serving Institution.

== History ==
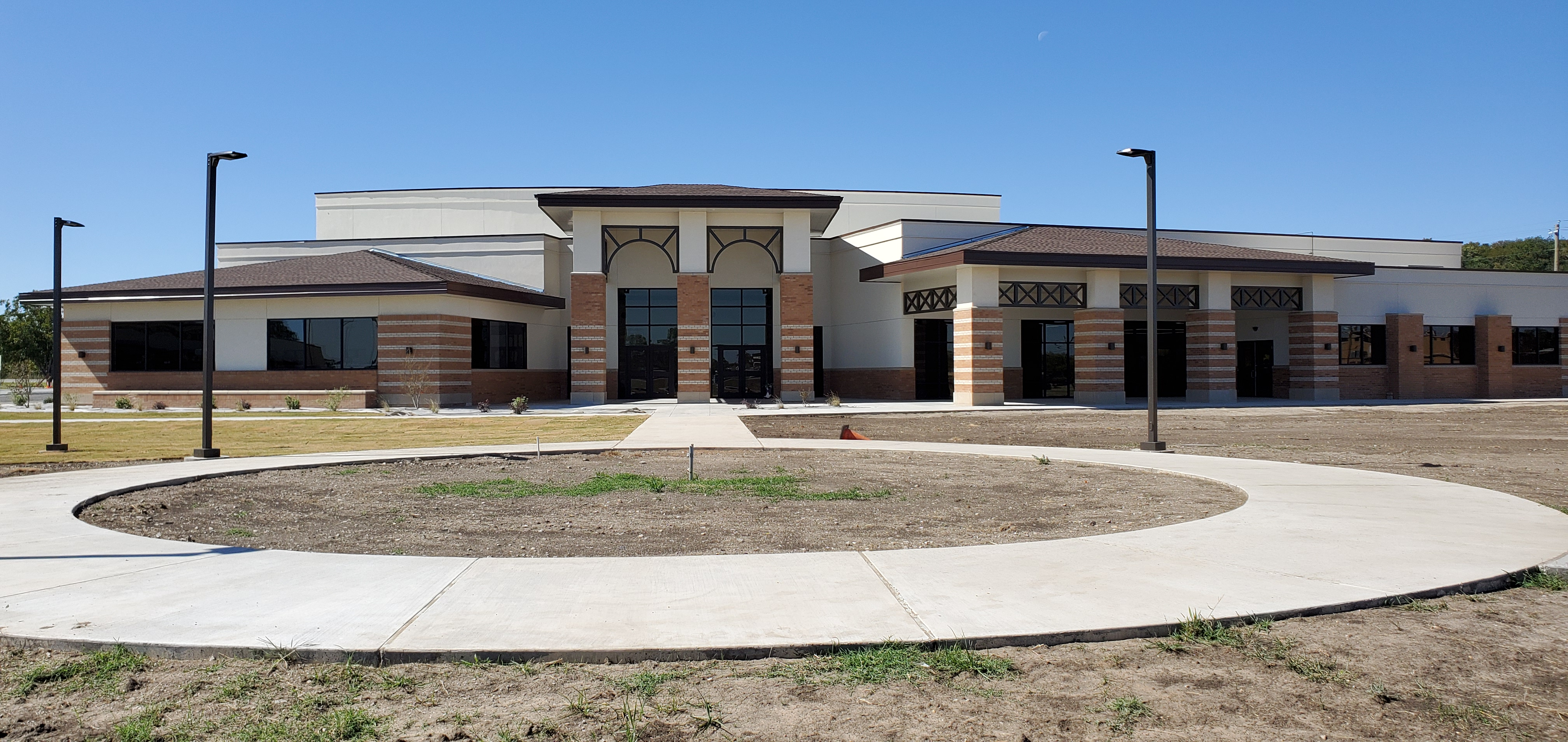
The combined cafeteria and auditorium at Ranger College.

The college opened as an extension of the local public school on September 13, 1926, with thirty students. The State Department of Education recognized the college on March 23, 1927. Ranger College was a governed by the public school system until August 18, 1950, when the Board of Education separated junior colleges. The college thereafter has been governed independently by a Board of Regents and its own presidents, of which Dr. G. C. Boswell was the first.

College president	Service years
R.F. Holloway	1926–1936
W.T. Walton	1936–1941
Grover C. Boswell	1941–1952
FW.W. Smith (acting)	Jan. 1953 – Mar. 1953
R.N. Cluck (Interim)	Mar. 1953 – Aug. 1953
Dr. Price R. Ashton	1953–1959
Dr. Theodore Nicksick Jr.	1959–1966
Dr. E.W. Mince	1966–1971
Dr. Jack Elsom	1971–1990
Dr. Joe Mills	1990–2005
James McDonald (interim)	May 2005 – 2006
Dr. Ken Tunstall	2006–2008
James McDonald (interim)	May 2008 – 2009
Dr. William J. Campion	2009–2021
Dr. Derrick Worrels	2021 -

In 2010, Ranger College opened campuses in Early and Stephenville, Texas.

A 2011 proposal to close several rural Texas colleges was not adopted, and Ranger College continued to receive state funding. Since then, student enrollment at Ranger College has increased by 46%:

Term	Total Enrollment
Fall 2011	1736
Fall 2024	2544

In November 2016, the city of Ranger voted to approve a $10 million bond to provide new buildings and renovations across campus. Construction began in the winter of 2017 and was completed in 2020.

Ranger College is accredited as a degree-granting institution by the Southern Association of Colleges and Schools.

== Athletics ==
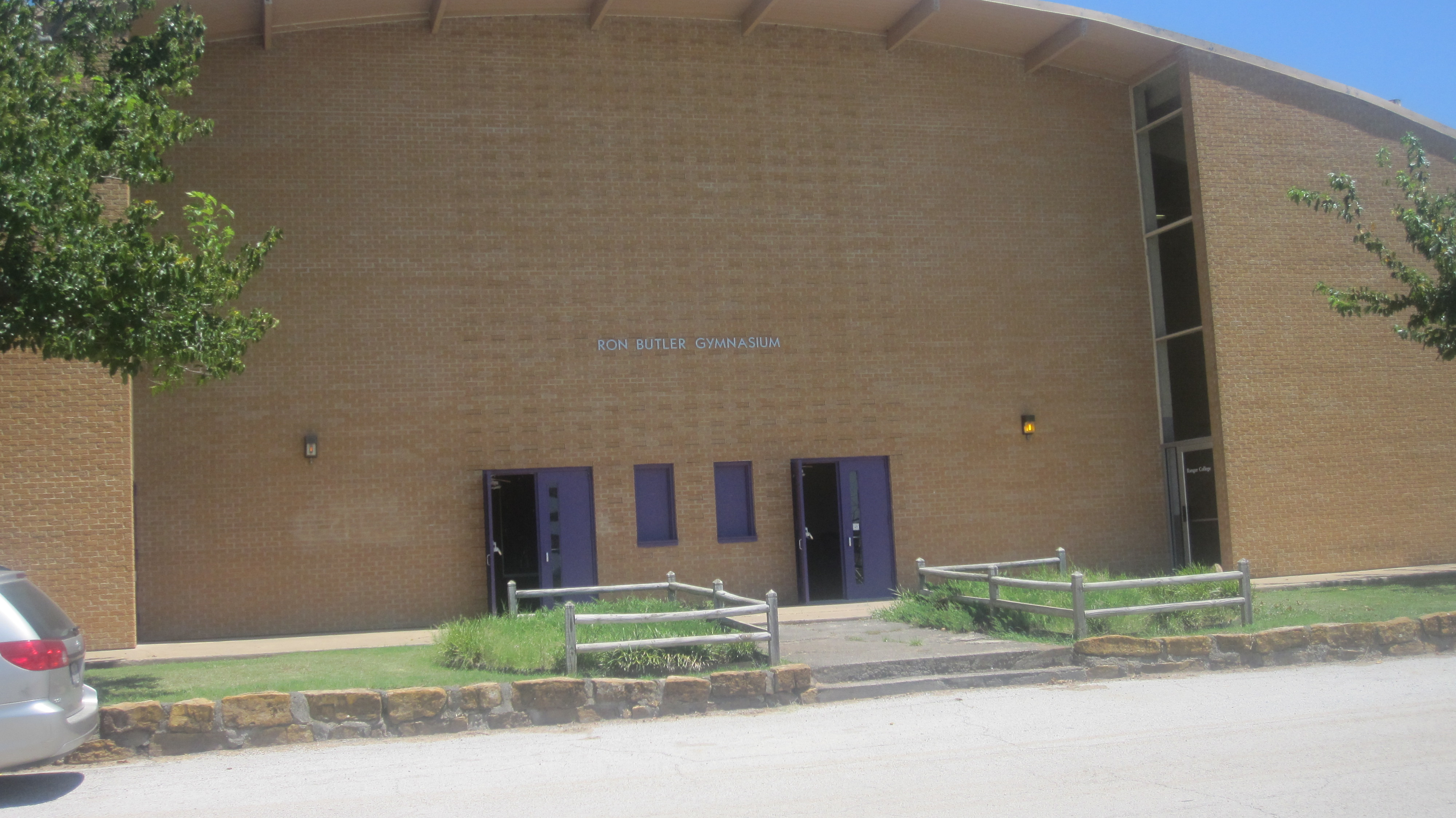
Ron Butler Gymnasium

National championships

- Women's cross country, 2020
- Rodeo, 2007
- Football, 1979
- Baseball, 1973, 1978

Ranger College's athletic teams are nicknamed the Rangers. The Rangers compete in men's and women's basketball, baseball, softball, cross country running, golf, rodeo, soccer, and volleyball. The basketball teams play at Ron Butler Gymnasium. The baseball team plays at Ellis Burks Field, named after Ranger College alumnus and retired Major League Baseball player Ellis Burks.

In 1979 the Ranger College football team won the NJCAA national championship.

In June 2007, Ranger College won the National Intercollegiate Rodeo Association men's team title in the College National Finals Rodeo held in Casper, Wyoming. Ranger had only been competing again since 2005, after a 25-year hiatus.

In August 2007, Ranger replaced its football program with men's and women's soccer and men's golf programs. The football team finished the year with a record of 4 wins and 5 losses; the team was unable to compete its schedule due to ineligibility issues.

In 2013 the Ranger College men's soccer team won the NJCAA Region V Championship and participated in the NJCAA Division I national tournament.

In 2015–16 the men's basketball team was found to have committed two eligibility violations. The first instance caused them to forfeit four games. The second and more serious violation required them to forfeit all games from the 2015–2016 season and to be placed on probation by the NJCAA for the 2016–17 season, meaning they were barred from any post-season play in 2016–17.

In June 2016, Ranger earned a College National Finals Rodeo championship when sophomore heeler Wesley Thorp won the team roping event, with partner Cole Weeler of Weatherford College.

In 2020, the Ranger College women's cross-country team won the NJCAA national title, and head cross-country coach Kathy Graham was named NJCAA National Coach of the Year.

In 2024, Ranger College head rodeo coach Llew Rust was named the National Intercollegiate Rodeo Association's Coach of the Year.

== Notable alumni ==
- Kris Clyburn, professional basketball player
- Billy Gillispie, NCAA basketball coach
- Agapius Masong, distance runner
- Jim Morris, professional baseball player for the Tampa Bay Rays and subject of the 2002 Disney film The Rookie.
- James "Boobie" Miles, high school football player and one of the subjects of the 1990 novel Friday Night Lights: A Town, a Team, and a Dream and its 2004 film adaptation
- Johnny Perkins, professional football player
- Del Thompson, professional football player and member of Ranger College's 1979 national championship team
- Keisei Tominaga, college basketball player
