= Erath County Courthouse =

- U.S. National Register of Historic Places
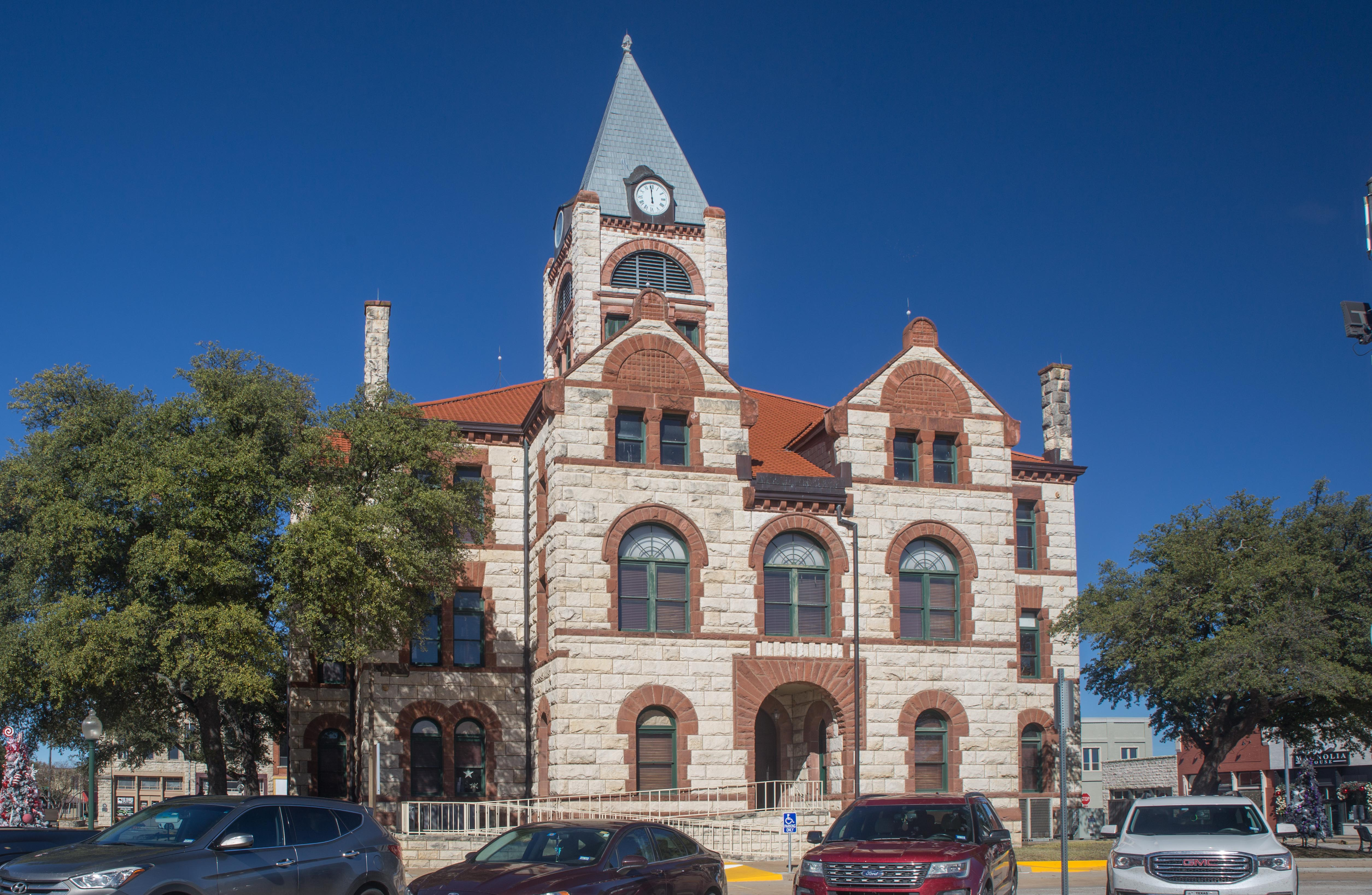
- Earth County Courthouse (2022)

- Location within Texas Location within the United States
- Location: Public Sq., Stephenville, Texas
- Coordinates: 32°13′12″N 98°12′07″W
- Area: 2 acres (0.81 ha)
- Built: 1892
- Architect: James Riely Gordon
- Architectural style: Romanesque
- NRHP reference No.: 77001441
- Added to NRHP: August 18, 1977

The Erath County Courthouse is a historic courthouse in Stephenville, Texas. It is listed on the National Register of Historic Places.

== History ==
The first courthouse in Erath County was built in 1856. It was wooden and burned down in 1866. A second courthouse made of stone was built in 1887 was demolished in 1891 to make room for the third and current courthouse.

The third and current courthouse was designed by James Riely Gordon in a Richardsonian Romanesque style. Construction started on December 3, 1891 and the courthouse was finished on October 20, 1892.

The courthouse was remodelled in 1950.

The building was added to the National Register of Historic Places in 1977.

The building was restored in 1988.

== Description ==
The courthouse was constructed with local white limestone and red Pecos sandstone.

== See also ==
- National Register of Historic Places listings in Erath County, Texas
