= Ranger, Texas =

- City
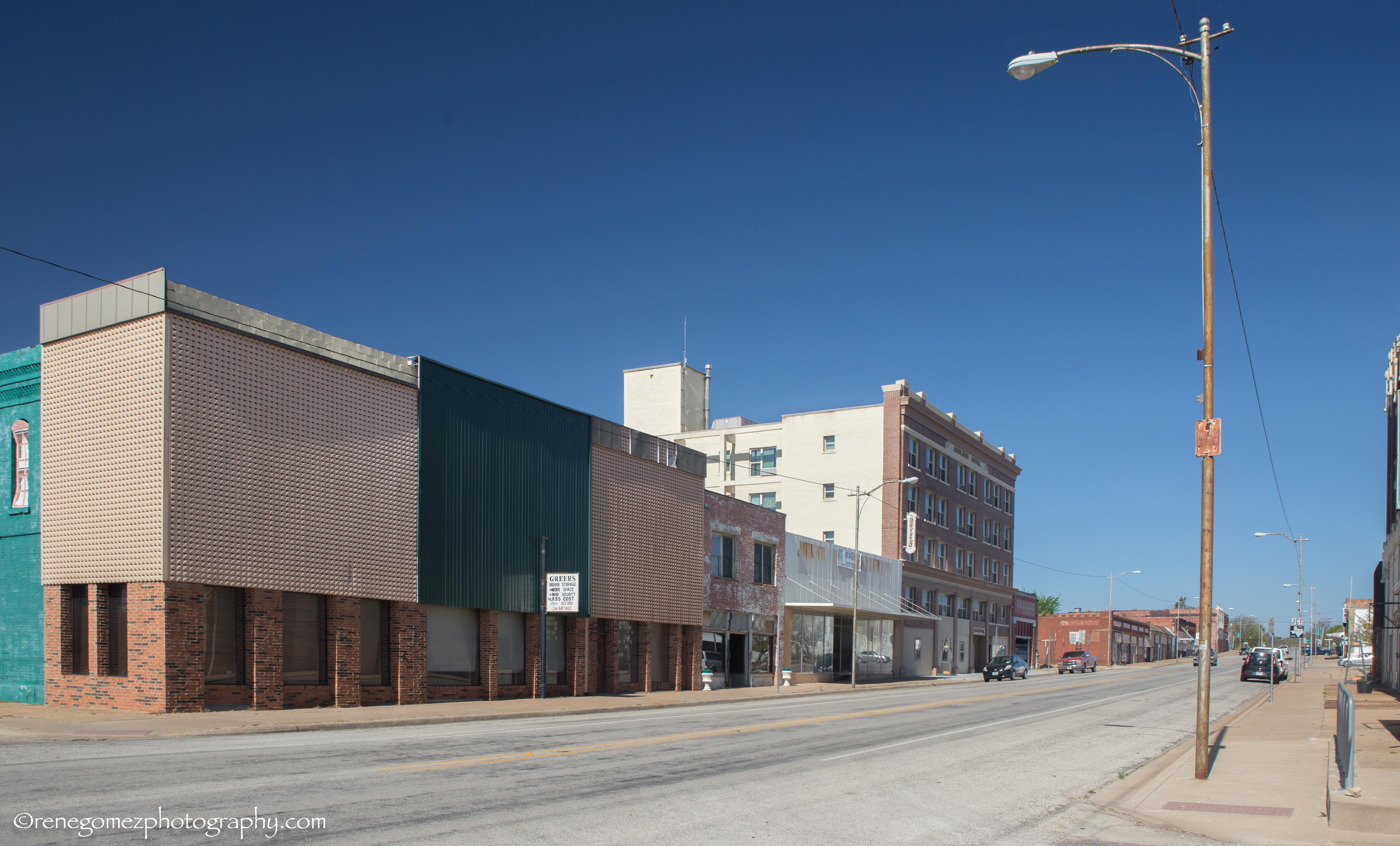
- Downtown Ranger, Texas

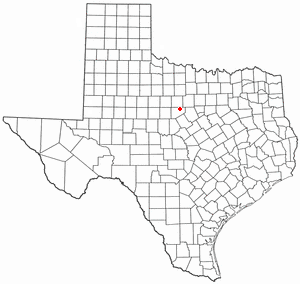
- Location of Ranger, Texas

- Coordinates: 32°28′09″N 98°40′31″W
- Country: United States
- State: Texas
- County: Eastland

Area
  - Total: 7.13 sq mi (18.46 km^{2})
  - Land: 7.00 sq mi (18.12 km^{2})
  - Water: 0.13 sq mi (0.34 km^{2})
- Elevation: 1,427 ft (435 m)

Population (2020)
  - Total: 2,300
  - Density: 330/sq mi (130/km^{2})
- Time zone: UTC-6 (Central (CST))
  - Summer (DST): UTC-5 (CDT)
- ZIP code: 76470
- Area code: 254
- FIPS code: 48-60632
- GNIS feature ID: 2411519
- Website: https://www.rangertx.gov/

Ranger is a city in Eastland County, Texas, United States. Its population was 2,300 at the 2020 census. Ranger College, a community college, is the second-largest employer in the community.

During the 1920s, Ranger, like nearby Cisco, Eastland, and Desdemona, was a petroleum boomtown.

== History ==
The Texas Pacific Coal Company of Thurber drilled a gas well north of Ranger in August 1917, after town civic leaders offered acreage in return for four test wells. Then on October 11, 1917, the McClesky well, one mile southwest of Ranger, produced oil at 1200 BOPD. Production came from the Strawn Formation sandstones at 1,300 to 2,000 feet (400 to 610 m), the Smithwick Shale, and the Marble Falls Formation limestone at 3,200 to 3,400 feet (980 to 1,040 m) feet. The Ranger Oil Field production peaked in July 1919 at 80,000 BOPD. The oil boom brought many seeking jobs, including farm boys and demobilized veterans.

== Geography ==
Ranger is located in northeastern Eastland County. Interstate 20 passes south and east of the city, with access from exits 349, 351, 352, and 354. I-20 leads east 85 miles (137 km) to Fort Worth and west 65 miles (105 km) to Abilene. Eastland, the county seat, is 10 miles (16 km) to the west.

According to the United States Census Bureau, the city of Ranger has a total area of 7.1 square miles (18.5 km^{2}), of which 0.1 sq mi (0.3 km^{2}), or 1.83%, is covered by water.

Ranger Antique Airfield dates back to 1911. Pilot Amelia Earhart landed at the field in 1931 in her Pitcairn Autogyro. Ranger Airfield has two grass runways: 1/19 at 3400 x 80 ft and 17/35 at 1950 x 60 ft.

=== Climate ===
The climate in this area is characterized by hot, humid summers and generally mild to cool winters. According to the Köppen climate classification, Ranger has a humid subtropical climate, Cfa on climate maps.

== Demographics ==
Historical population
Census	Pop.	Note	%±
1920	16,205		—
1930	6,208		−61.7%
1940	4,553		−26.7%
1950	3,989		−12.4%
1960	3,313		−16.9%
1970	3,094		−6.6%
1980	3,142		1.6%
1990	2,803		−10.8%
2000	2,584		−7.8%
2010	2,468		−4.5%
2020	2,300		−6.8%
U.S. Decennial Census

=== 2020 census ===
As of the 2020 census, Ranger had a population of 2,300. The median age was 39.1 years; 20.2% of residents were under 18 and 18.1% were 65 or older. For every 100 females, there were 107.2 males, and for every 100 females 18 and over, there were 104.9 males 18 and over.

None of the residents lived in urban areas, while 100.0% lived in rural areas.

Of the 885 households in Ranger, 26.2% had children under 18 living in them, 37.9% were married-couple households, 22.4% were households with a male householder and no spouse or partner present, and 33.7% were households with a female householder and no spouse or partner present. About 36.9% of all households were made up of individuals, and 16.7% had someone living alone who was 65 or older.

The city had 1,153 housing units, of which 23.2% were vacant. The homeowner vacancy rate was 5.7% and the rental vacancy rate was 11.2%.

Racial composition as of the 2020 census
Race	Number	Percentage
White	1,807	78.6%
Black or African American	110	4.8%
American Indian and Alaska Native	29	1.3%
Asian	24	1.0%
Some other race	178	7.7%
Two or more races	152	6.6%
Hispanics or Latinos (of any race)	477	20.7%

=== 2000 census ===
As of the 2000 census, 2,584 people, 989 households, and 616 families resided in the city. The population density was 369.0 inhabitants per square mile (142.5/km^{2}). The 1,214 housing units averaged 173.4 per square mile (67.0/km^{2}). The racial makeup of the city was 84.83% White, 6.73% African American, 0.66% Native American, 0.43% Asian, 5.65% from other races, and 1.70% from two or more races. Hispanics or Latinos of any race were 13.51% of the population.

Of the 989 households, 28.0% had children under 18 living with them, 43.7% were married couples living together, 14.7% had a female householder with no husband present, and 37.7% were not families. About 34.5% of all households were made up of individuals, and 18.7% had someone living alone who was 65 or older. The average household size was 2.33, and the average family size was 3.00.

In the city, the age distribution was 22.7% under 18, 17.4% from 18 to 24, 20.9% from 25 to 44, 19.4% from 45 to 64, and 19.7% who were 65 or older. The median age was 36 years. For every 100 females, there were 97.1 males. For every 100 females age 18 and over, there were 93.8 males.

The median income in the city for a household was $22,500 and for a family was $28,255. Males had a median income of $24,333 versus $15,946 for females. The per capita income for the city was $11,698. About 14.4% of families and 18.3% of the population were below the poverty line, including 19.1% of those under 18 and 17.8% of those 65 or over.

== Education ==
The city is served by the Ranger Independent School District and home to the Ranger High School Bulldogs, 1953 state football champions (Class 1A). The city is also home to Ranger College.

== Notable people ==
- Stephen Arterburn, Evangelical Christian author and spokesman
- Bobby Cross, American football player
- Buster Mills, baseball player
- Ted Neeley, actor
- Bob Smith, American football player
- Eve Southern, actress
- Walter Prescott Webb, eminent Texas, Western and Great Plains historian

== Photo gallery ==
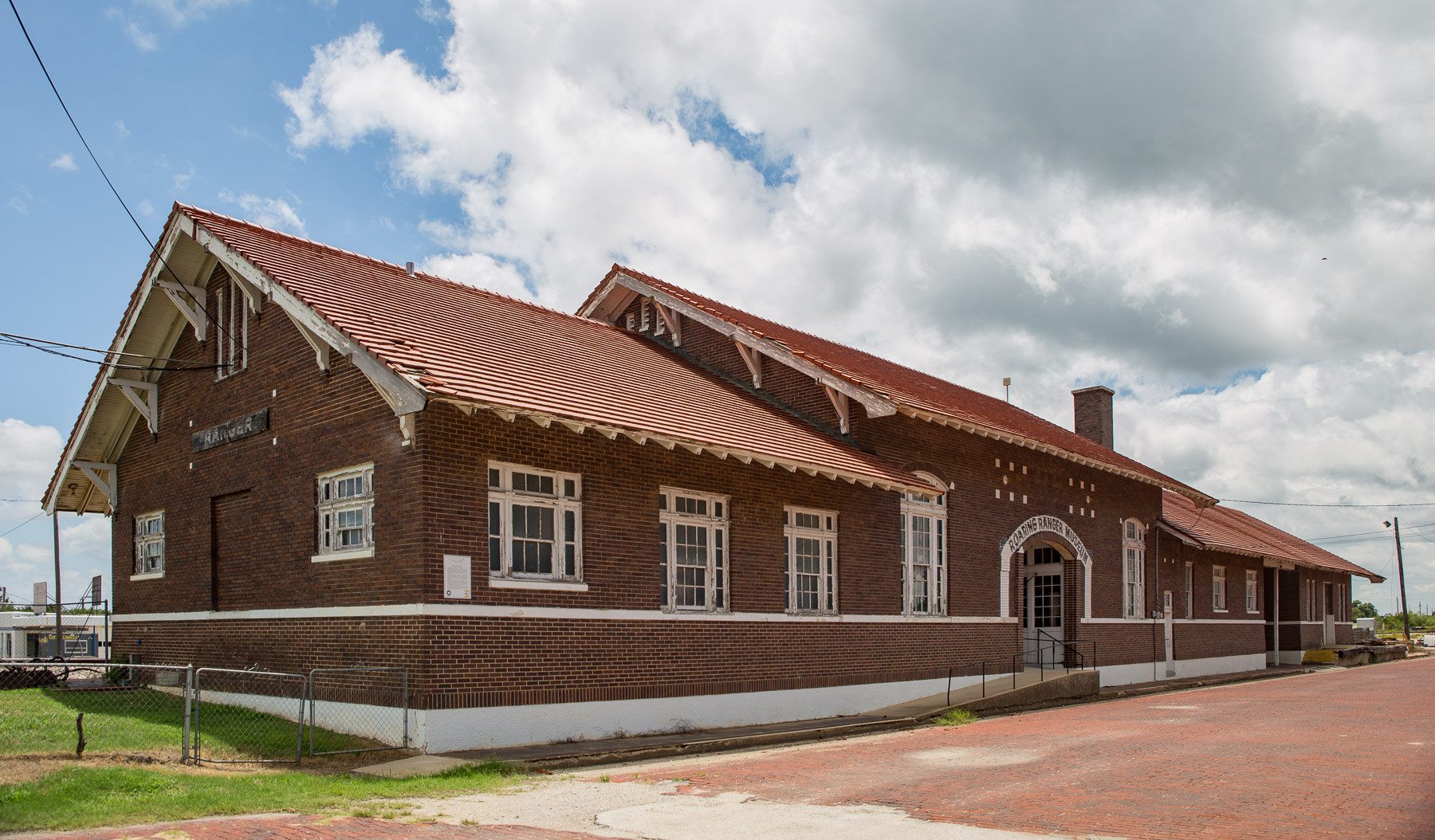
Ranger Train Depot

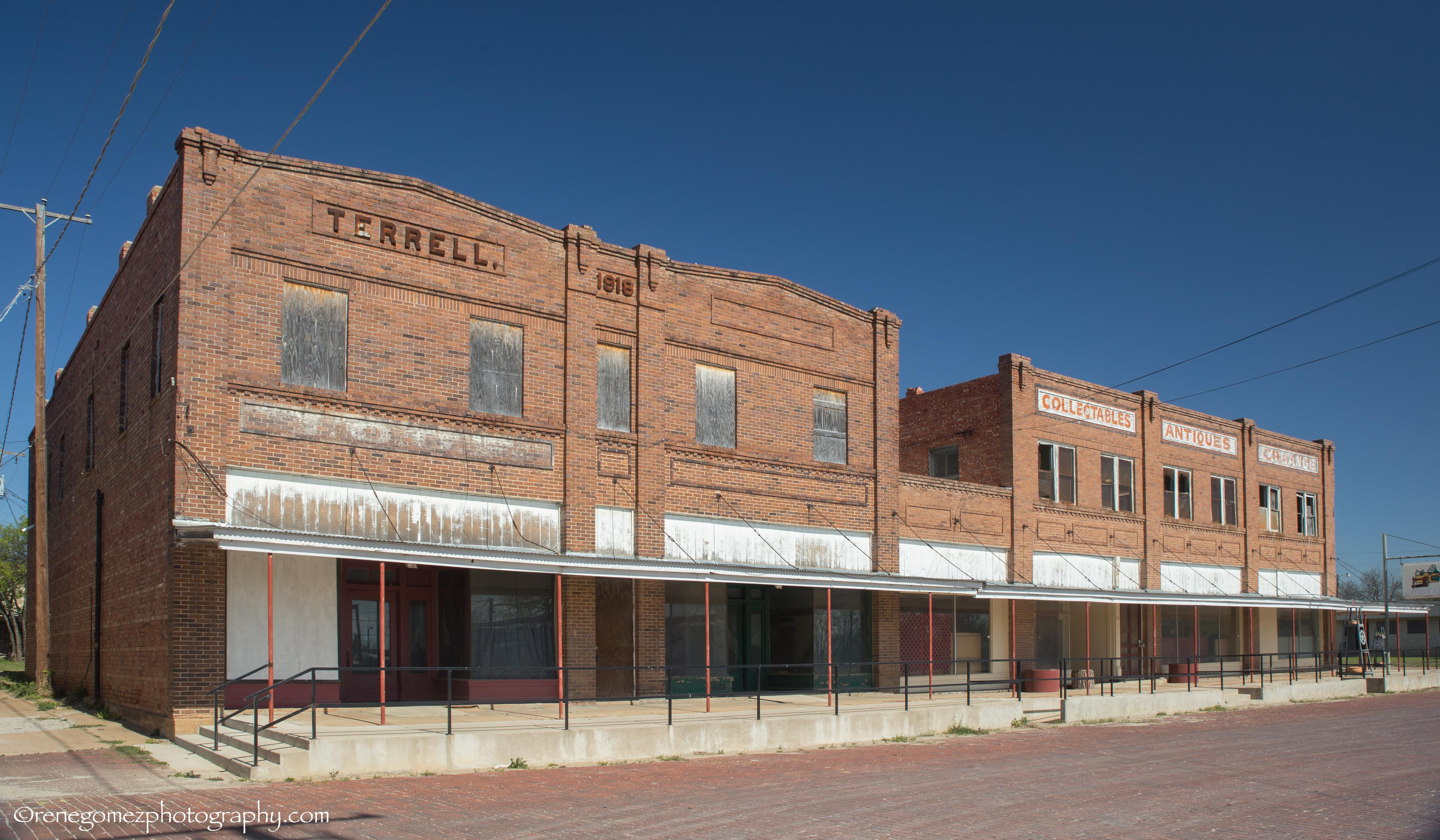
Terrell Building

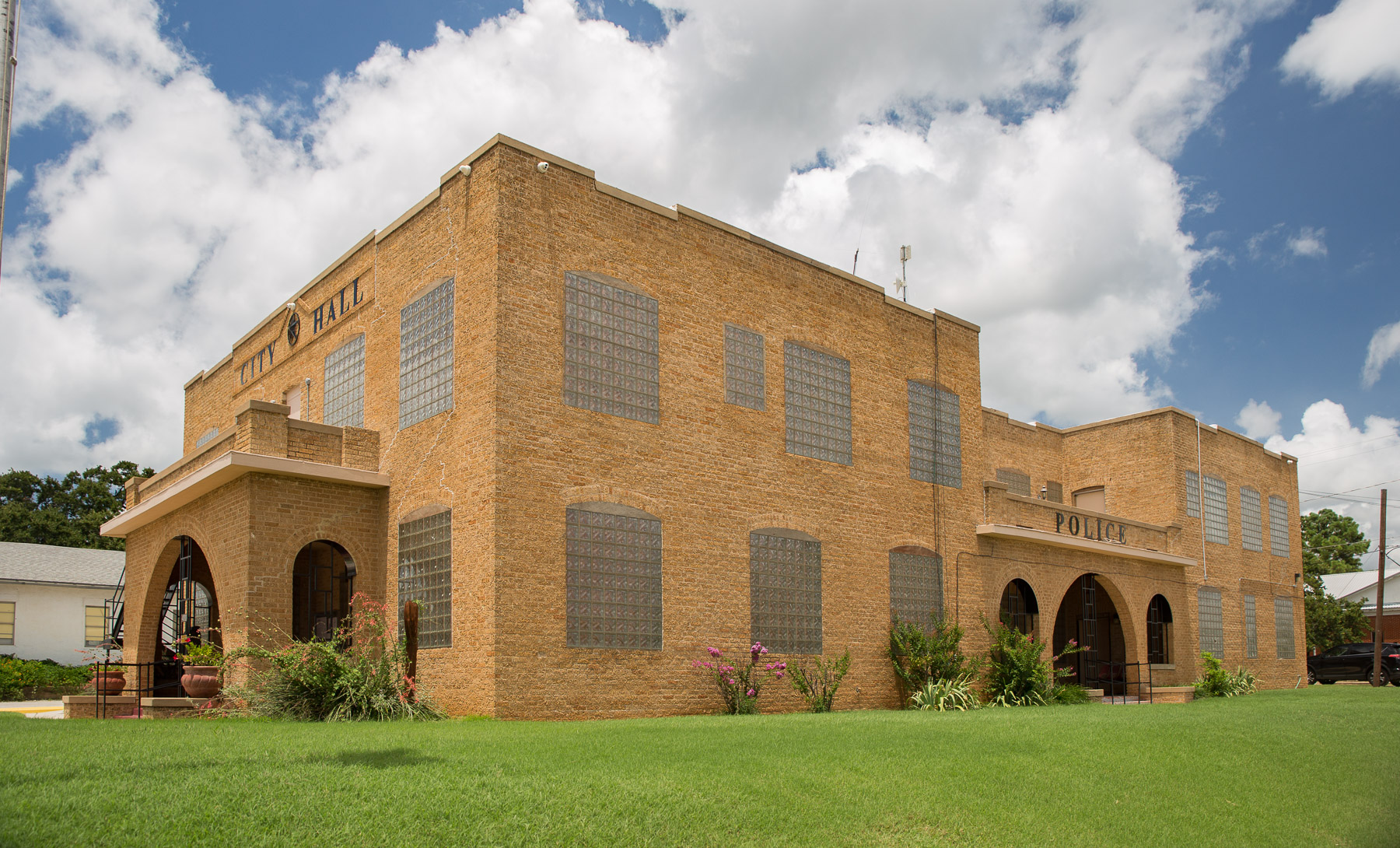
City Hall

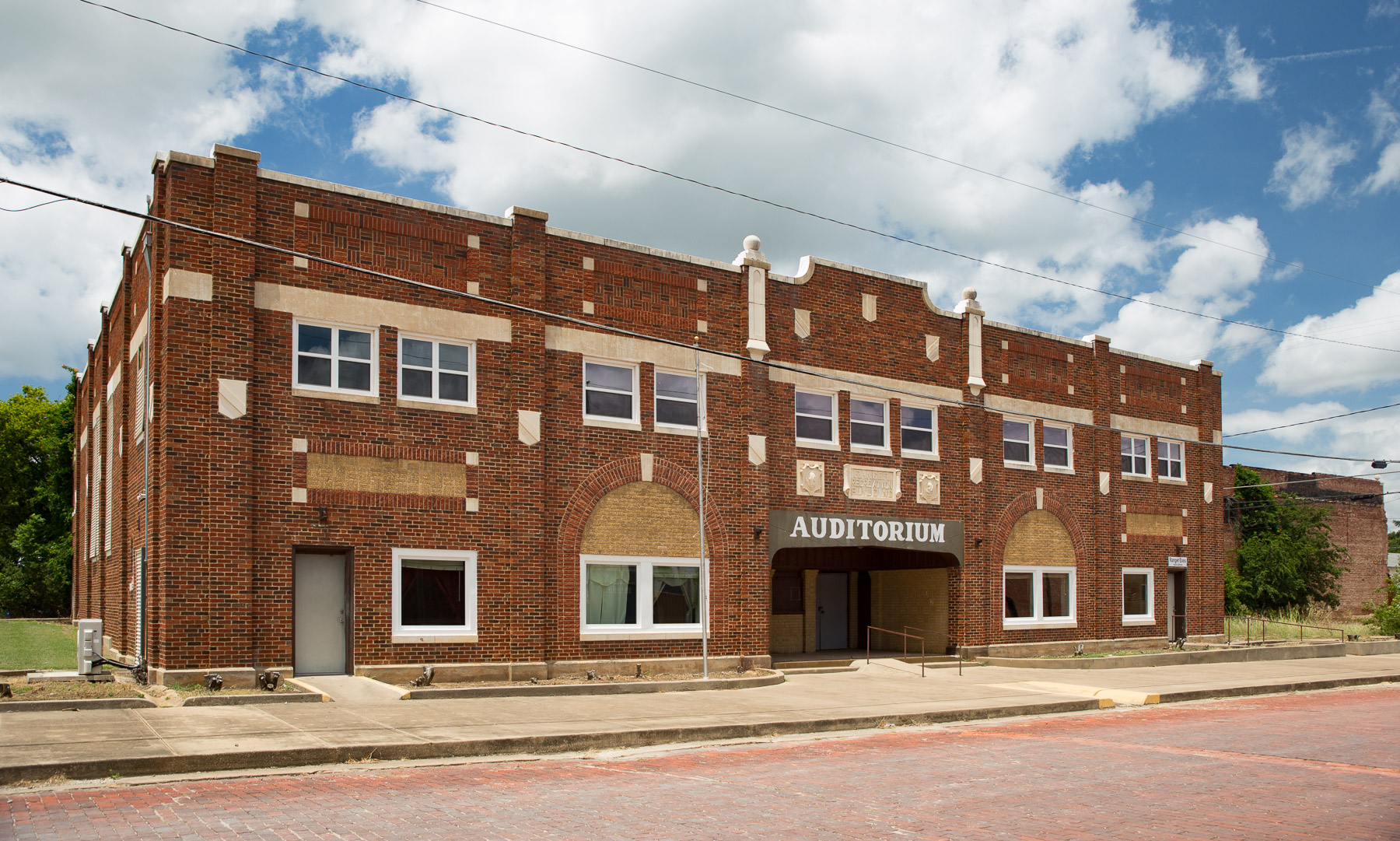
Auditorium

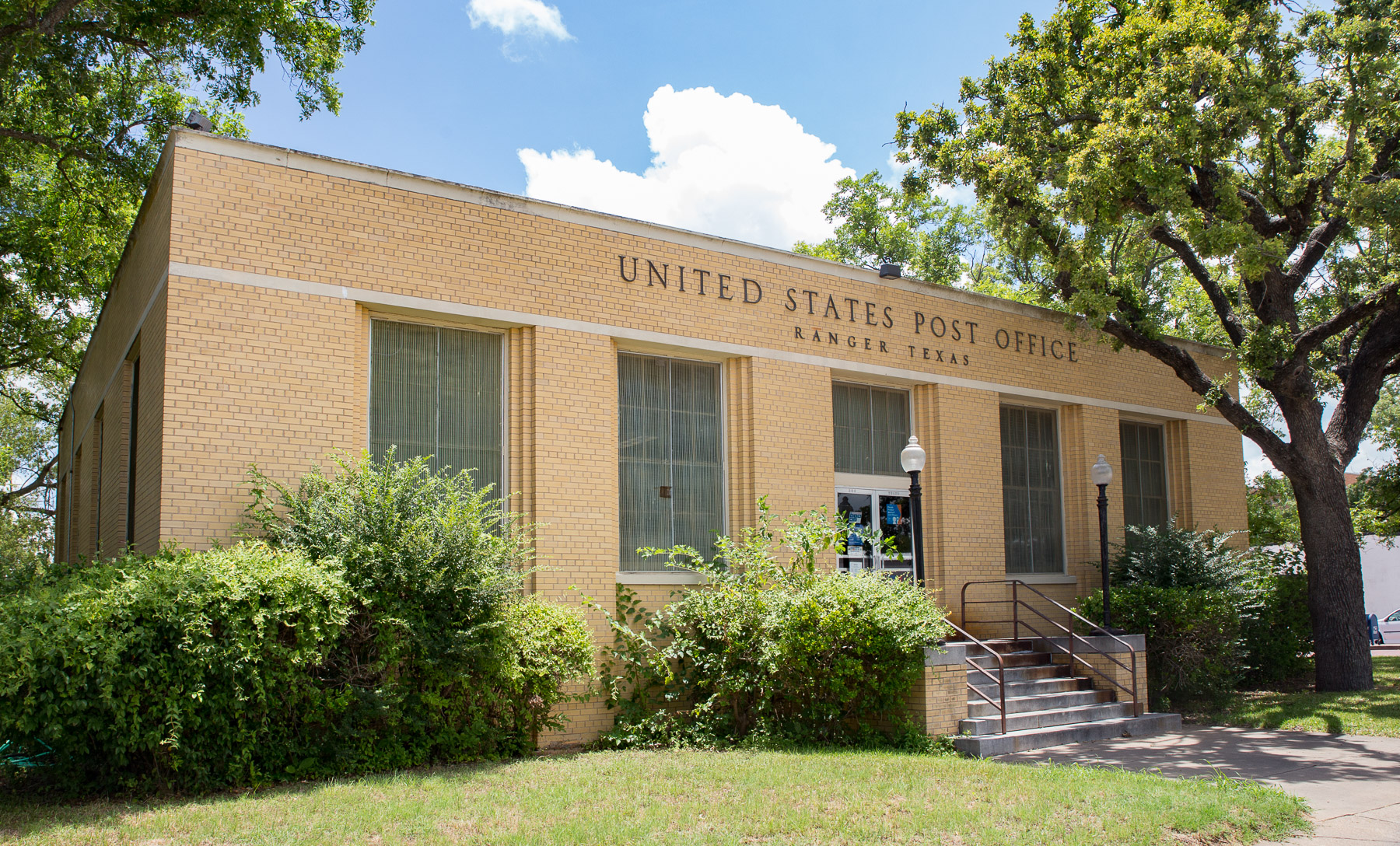
United States Post Office

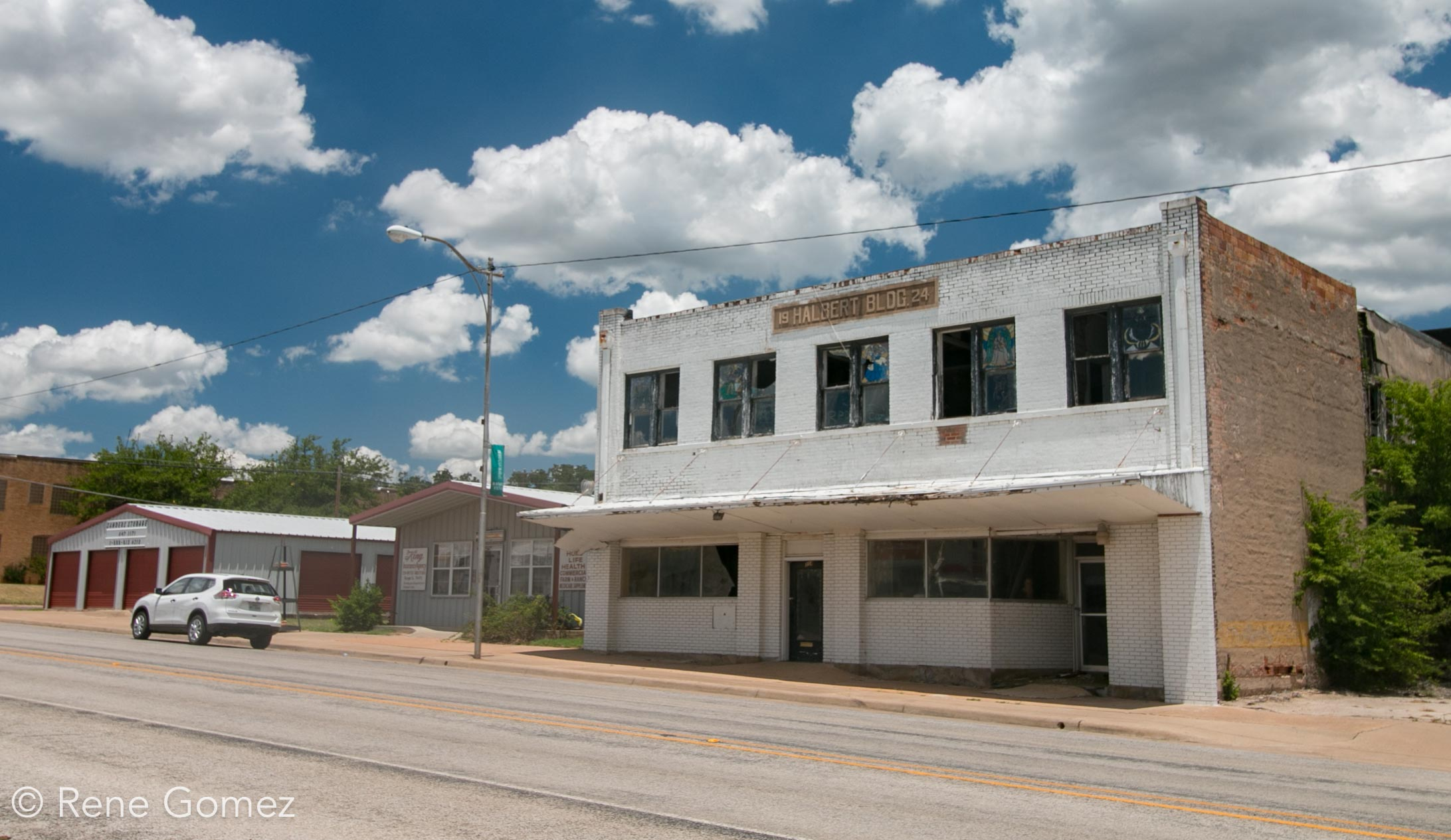
Halbert Building

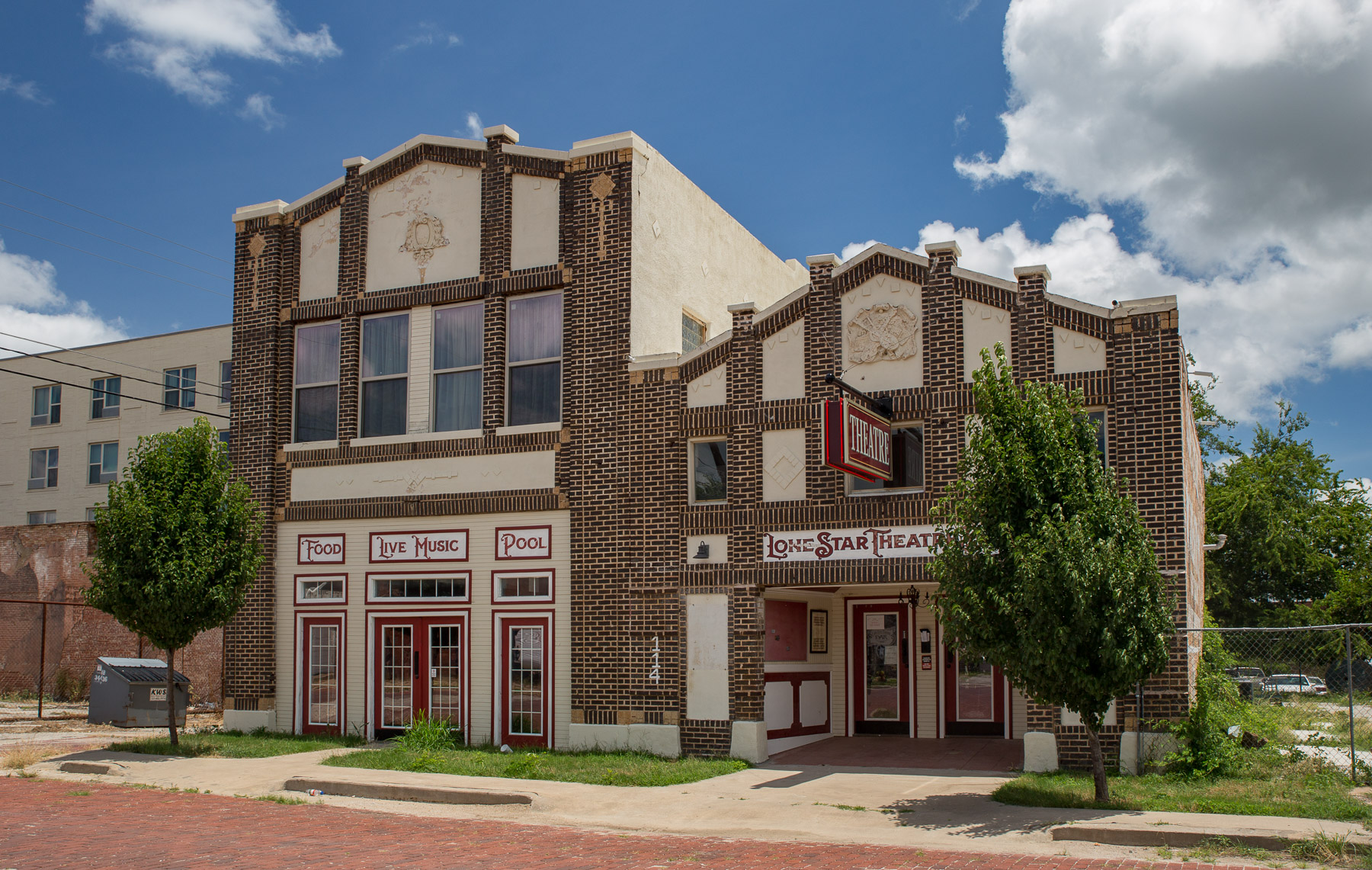
Lone Star Theater

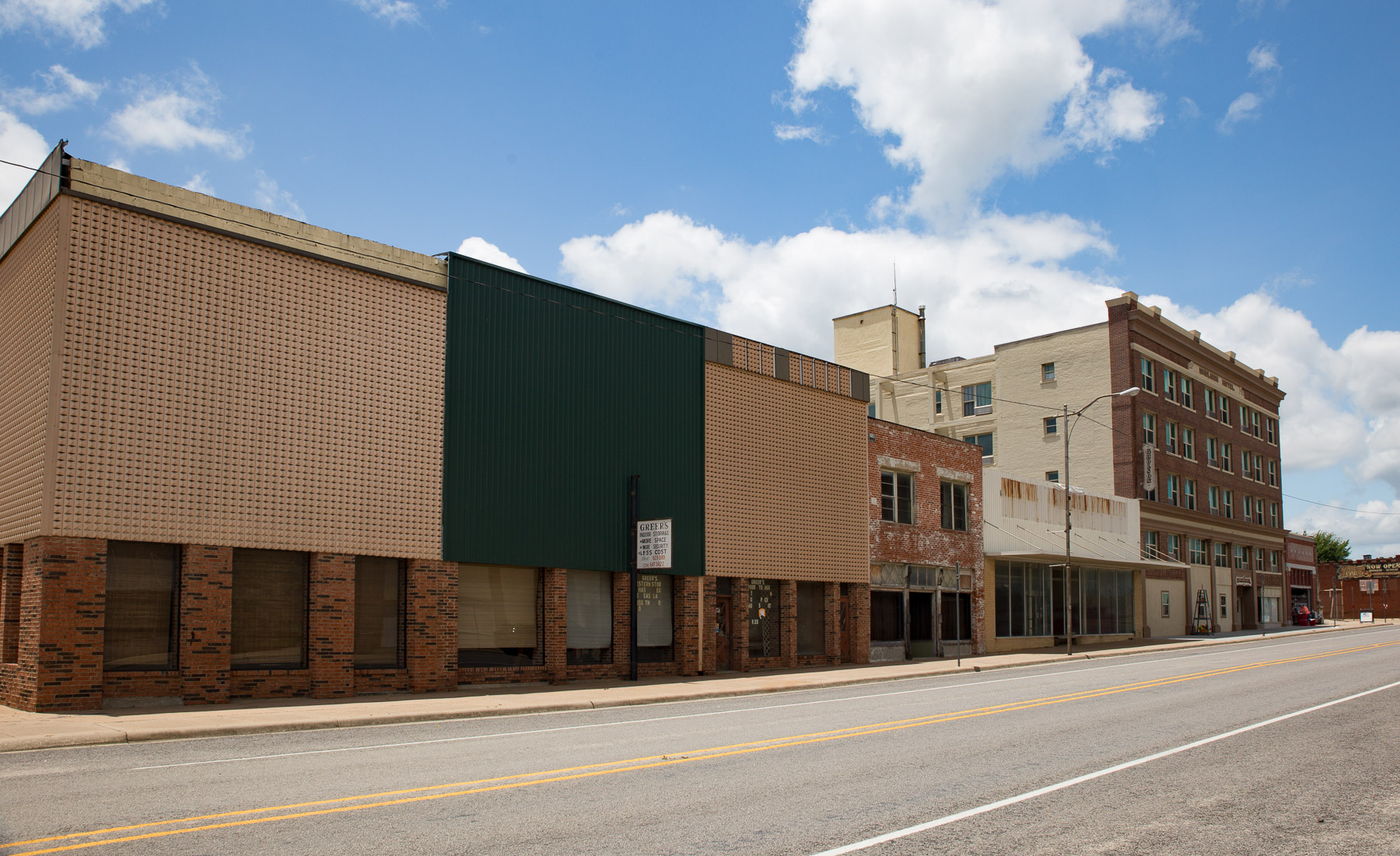
Downtown Ranger

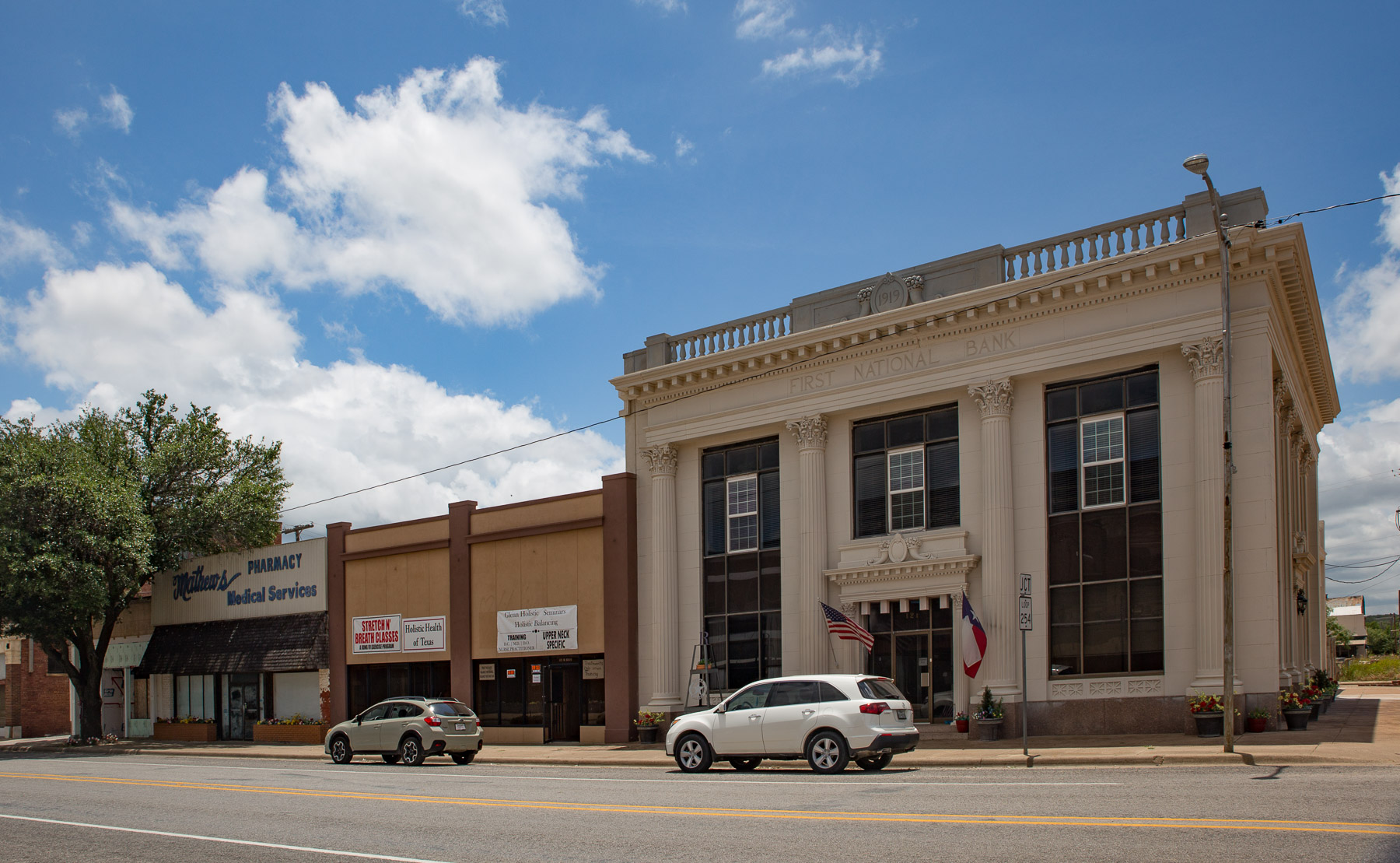
Downtown Ranger

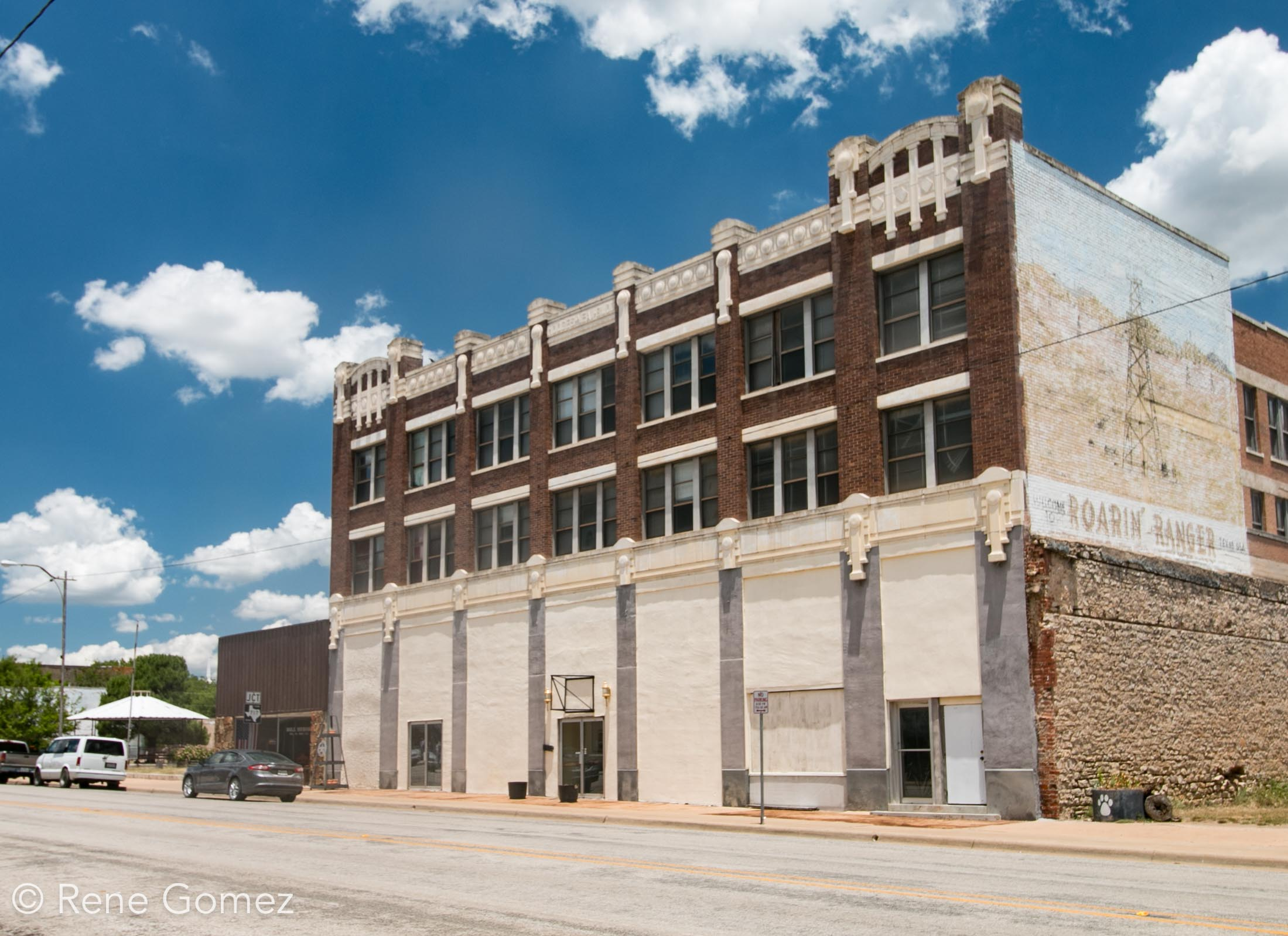
Downtown Ranger

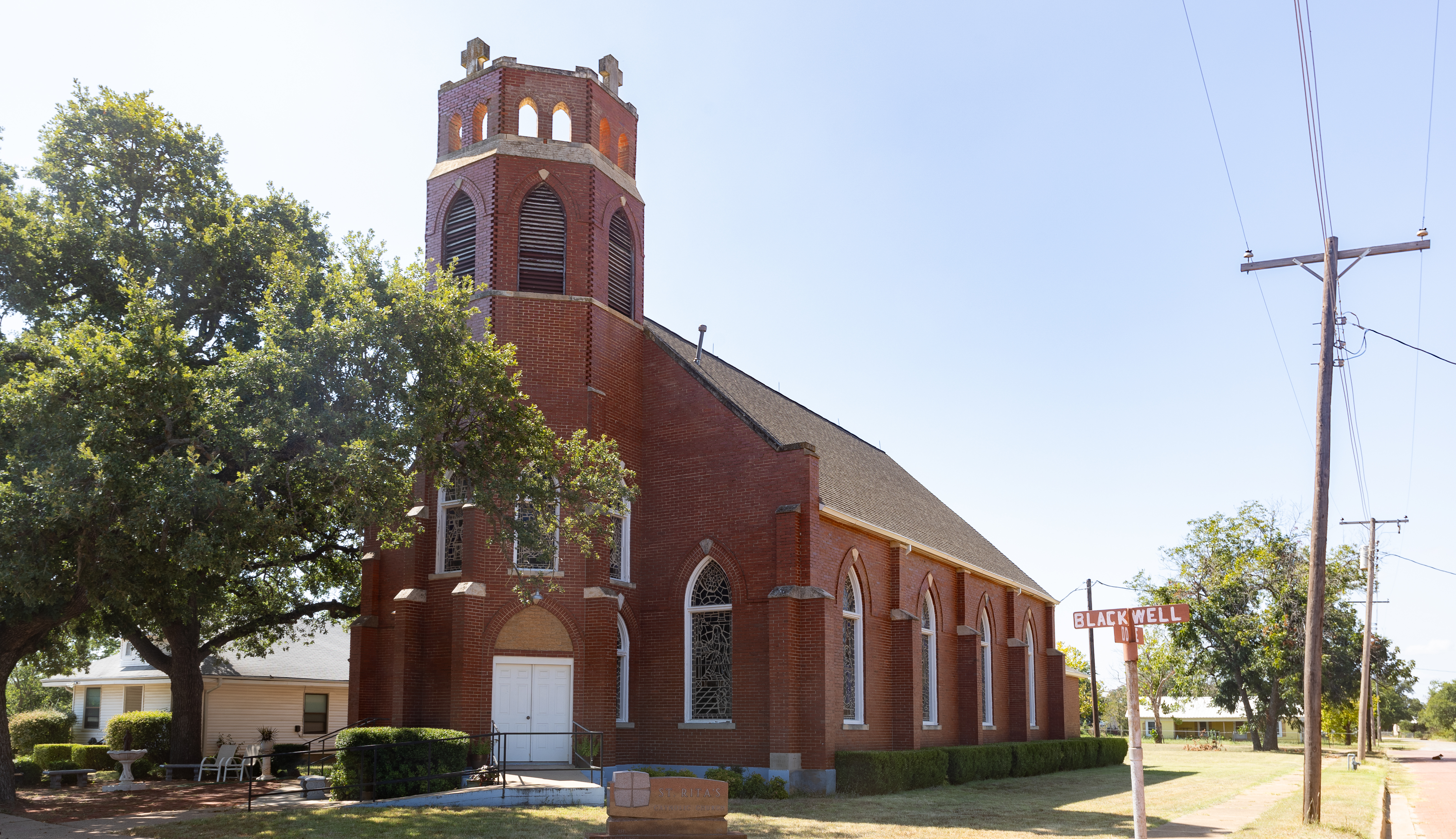
St.Rita's Catholic Church

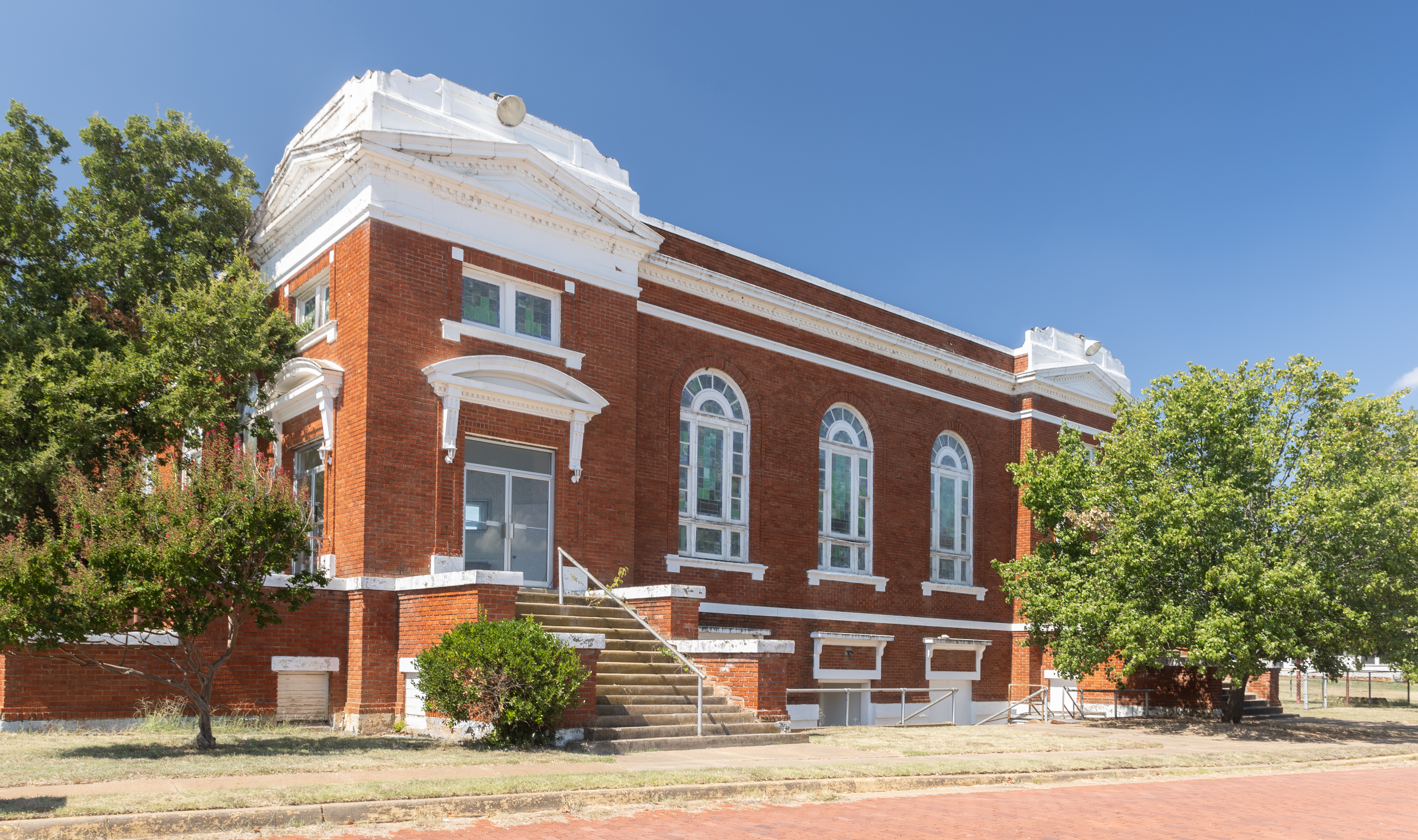
First Baptist Church

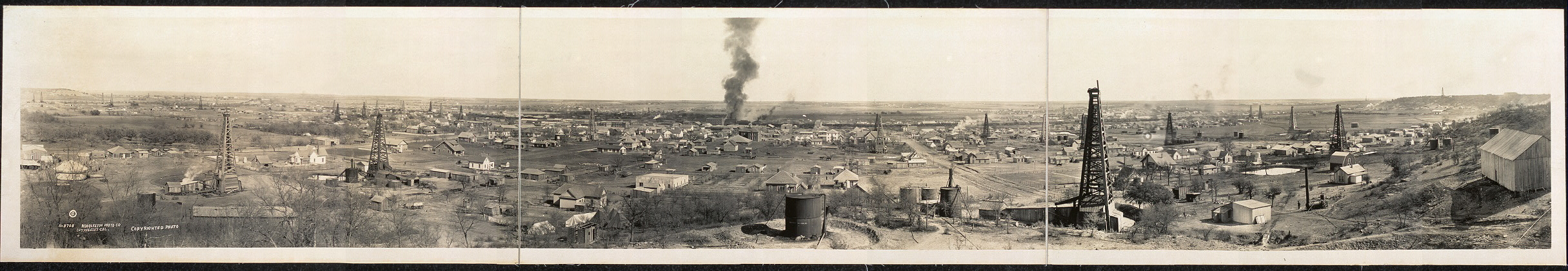
Oil-field boom town of Ranger in 1919
