= Thurber, Texas =

Coordinates: 32°30′26″N 98°25′2″W

- Thurber Historic District
- U.S. National Register of Historic Places
- U.S. Historic district
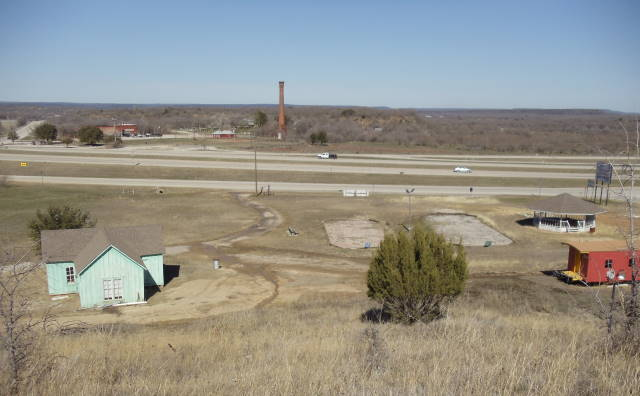
- Thurber Historic District

- Location within Texas Location within the United States
- Nearest city: Mingus, Texas
- Area: 1,006 acres (407 ha)
- Built: 1886
- Built by: Texas Pacific Coal Mining Company
- NRHP reference No.: 79002936
- Added to NRHP: August 17, 1979

Thurber is an unincorporated community in Erath County, Texas, United States (near the Palo Pinto county line), located 75 miles west of Fort Worth. It was, between 1888 and 1921, one of the largest producers of bituminous coal in Texas and the largest company town in the state, with a population of over 10,000. The population of the community is 48 per the 2010 United States census.

== History ==
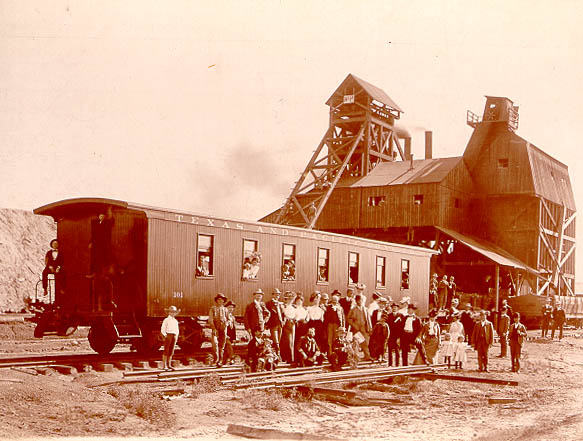
Coal-mining facility at Thurber, Texas, around 1900

Coal-mining operations began in Thurber in 1886 and reached a peak around 1920, when the town had a population of approximately 8,000 to 10,000, from more than a dozen nationalities, though Italians, Poles, and Mexicans predominated. At the peak, Thurber was one of Texas's largest bituminous coal-mining towns. Established as a company town, the mining operations in Thurber were unionized in 1903, and Thurber became the first totally closed shop town in the country. The Texas and Pacific Coal Company was not owned by the Texas and Pacific Railway, but it lay near its line and provided the trains of that company with much fuel. The Texas and Pacific Coal Company created a subsidiary company, Texas Pacific Mercantile and Manufacturing Company, to operate its mercantile operation, with company-run retail outlets like the grocery, dry goods, hardware, and drug stores, as well as saloons and other establishments.

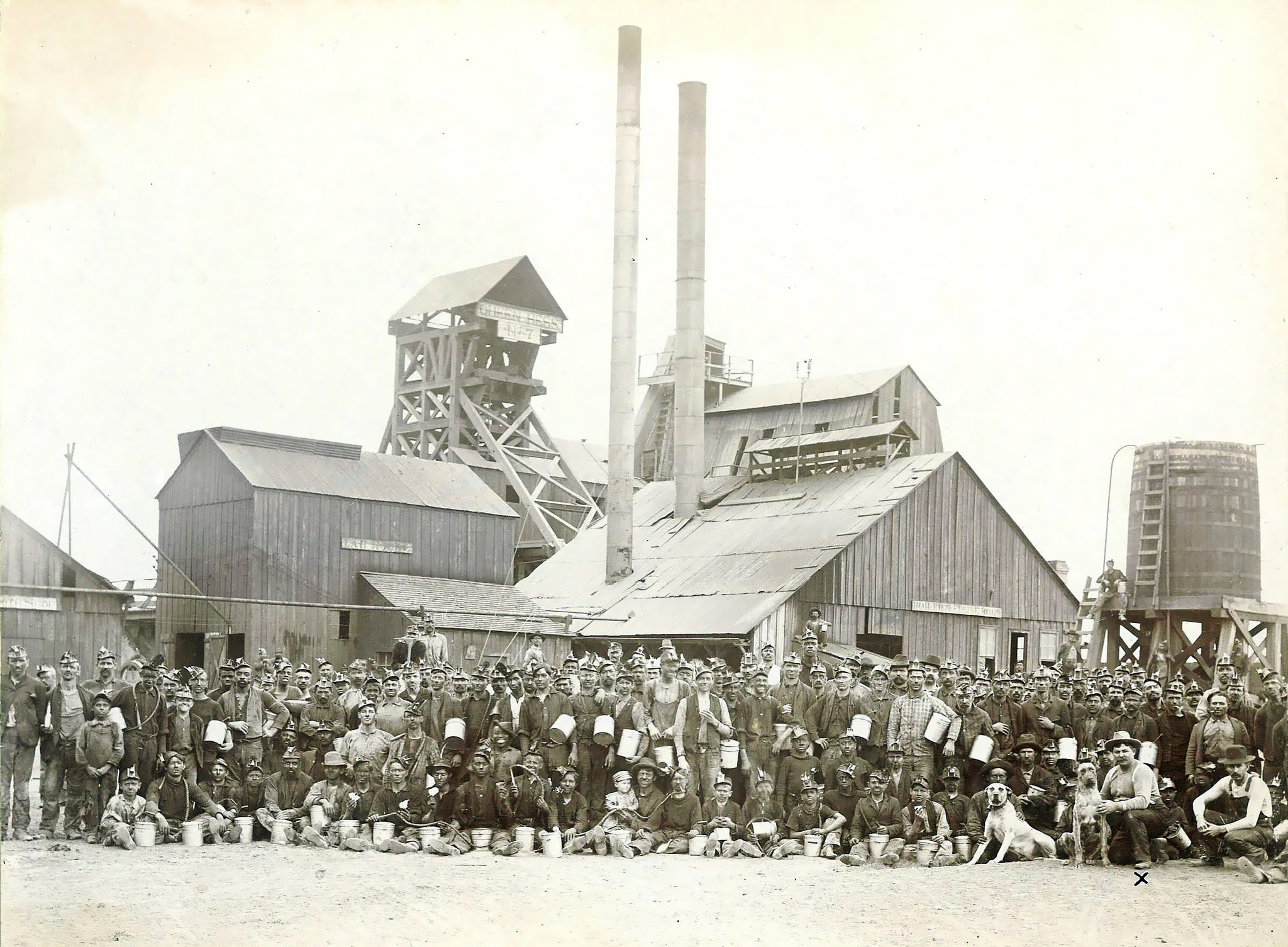
Mine No. 7 ("Queen Bess") at Thurber, Texas, around 1901.

The company that owned the town, the Texas and Pacific Coal Company, also produced vitrified paving bricks that were used throughout Texas and the southern half of the United States. By 1920, conversion of locomotives from coal to oil reduced demand and lowered prices and miners left the area through the 1920s. The Texas and Pacific Coal Company was instrumental in discovering oil in the Ranger, Texas, area as part of the Texas Oil Boom; the company re-branded itself the Texas Pacific Coal and Oil Company, and, eventually, the Texas Pacific Oil Company.

Nationwide, there are several thousands of people whose roots go back to Thurber. There are several landmarks in Thurber, such as The Thurber Cemetery (which has over a thousand graves), the restored St. Barbara's Catholic Church, a restored and furnished coal miner's house, New York Hill, and much more. A historic Thurber smokestack can be seen from Interstate 20 near Thurber. Also at Thurber is the W. K. Gordon Center for Industrial History of Texas, a museum containing information on historical Thurber (operated by nearby Tarleton State University), as well as the historic Smokestack Restaurant, and the New York Hill Restaurant built on what was once the site of the town's Episcopal Church at the top of New York Hill.

== Notable people ==
- Johnny Lucadello, baseball player
- Tony Lucadello, baseball scout
- Rex Trailer, television cowboy star
- Tony Venzon, baseball umpire

== Photo gallery ==
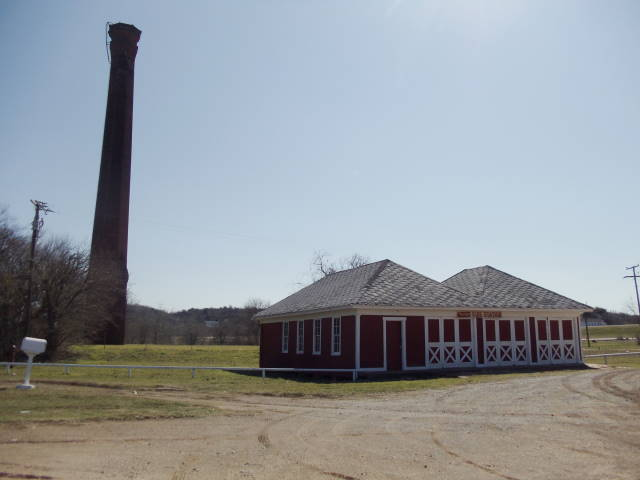
Thurber smokestack and fire station

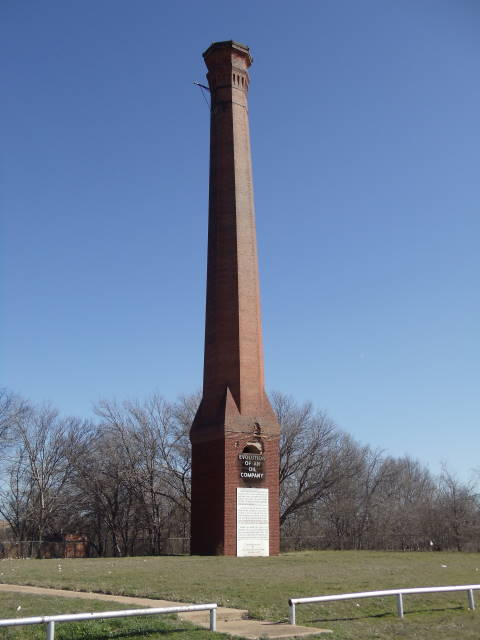
Thurber smokestack

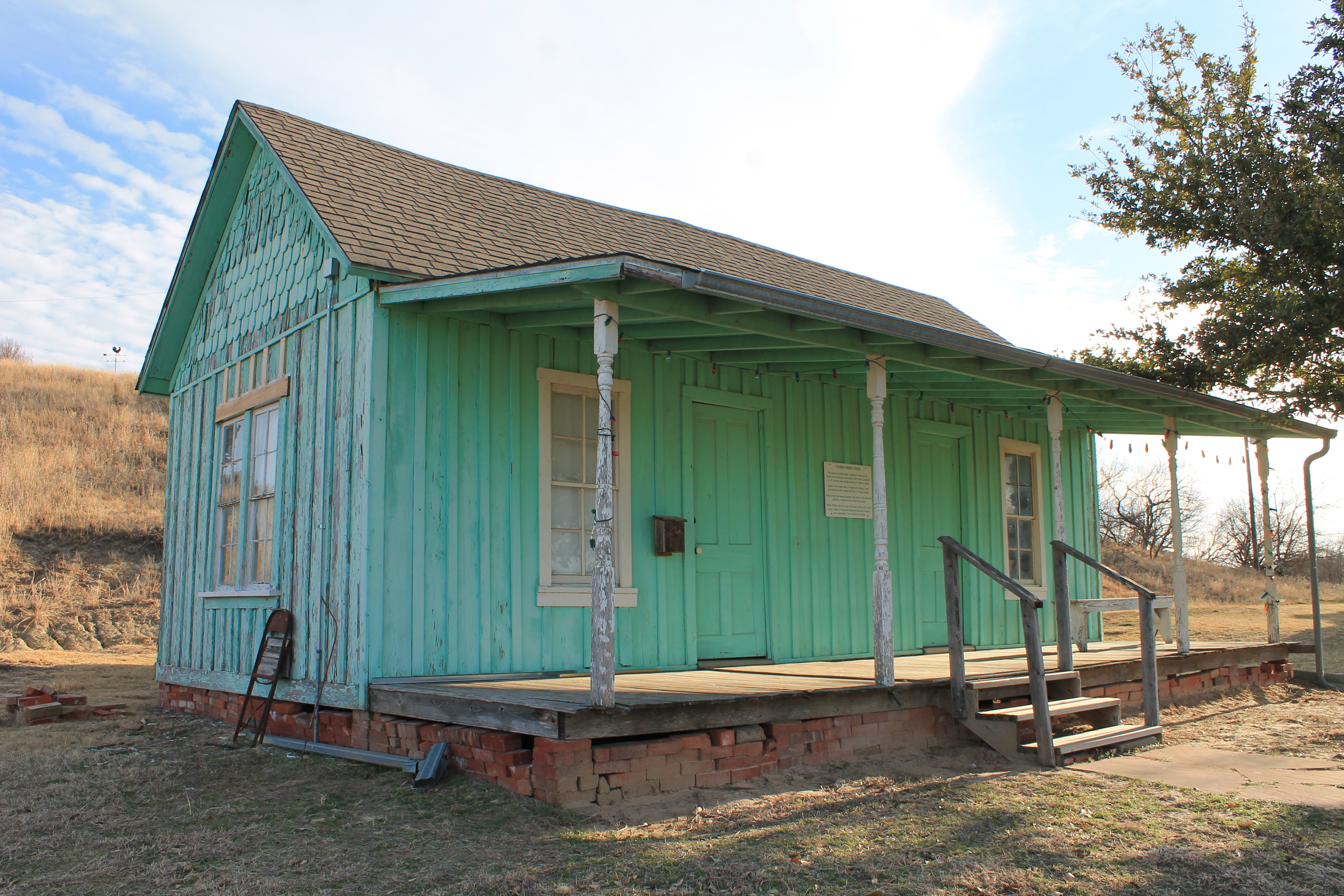
Miner's house

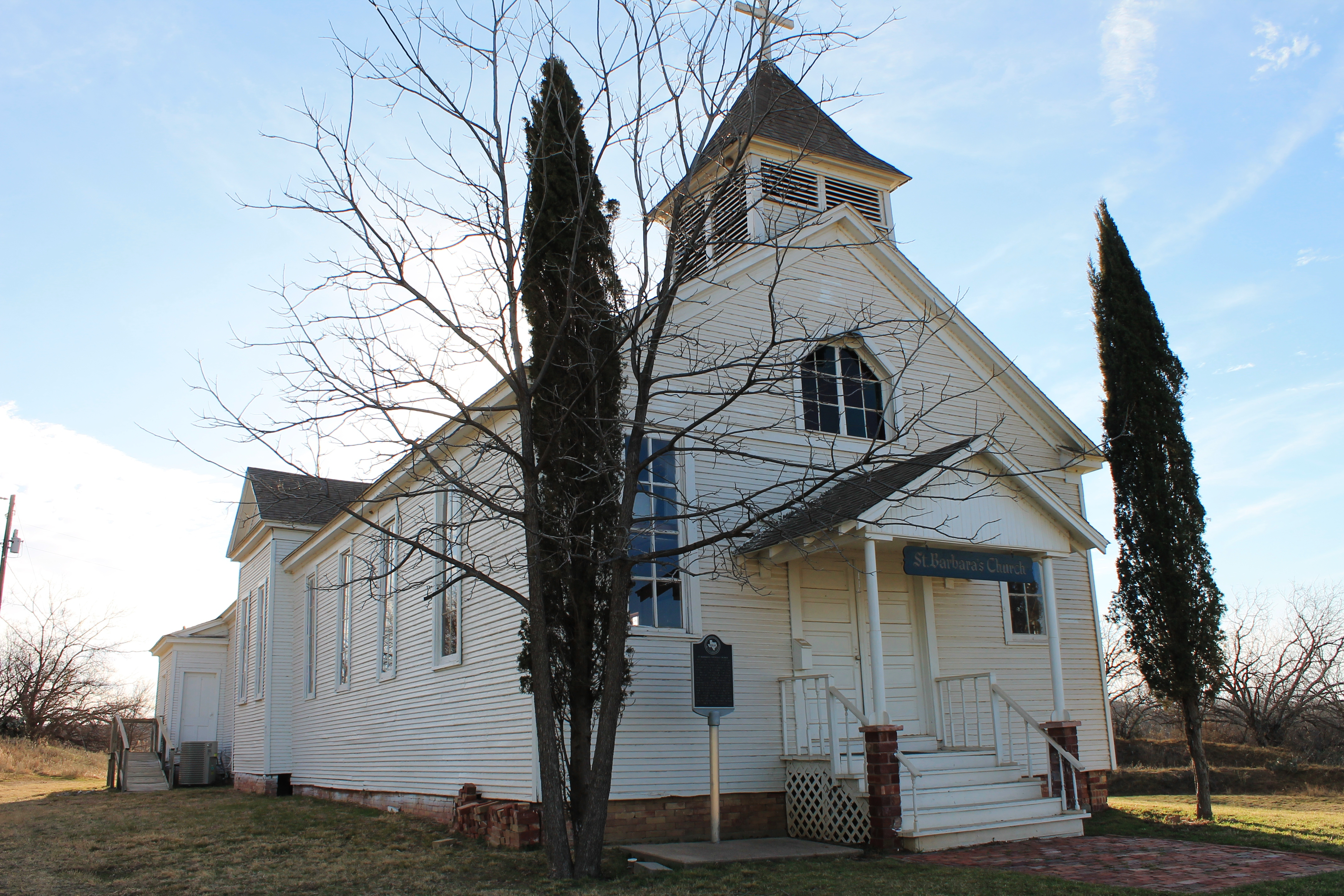
Saint Barbara's Catholic Church

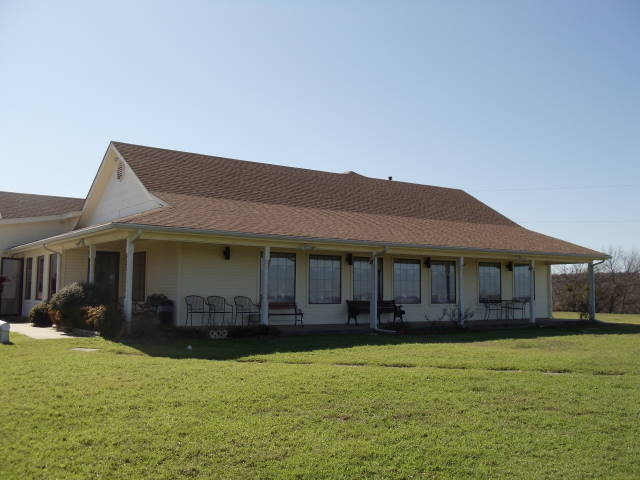
New York Hill Restaurant

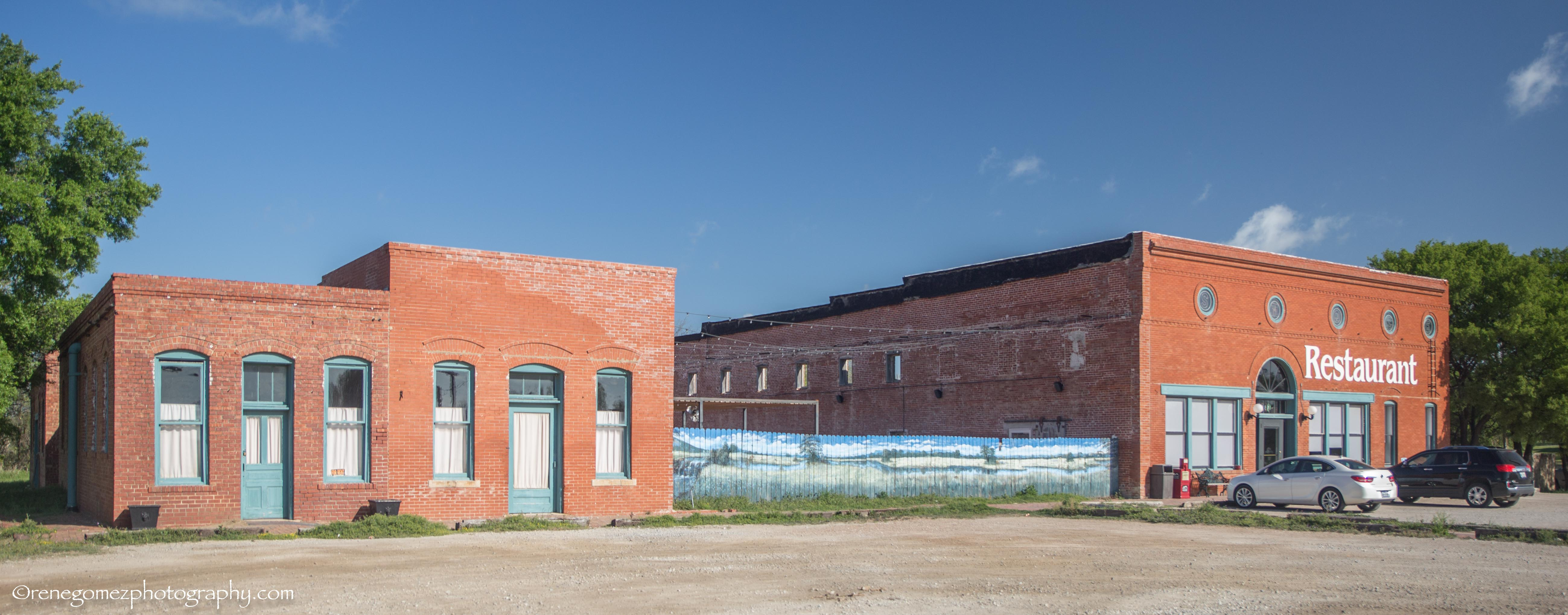
Smokestack Restaurant

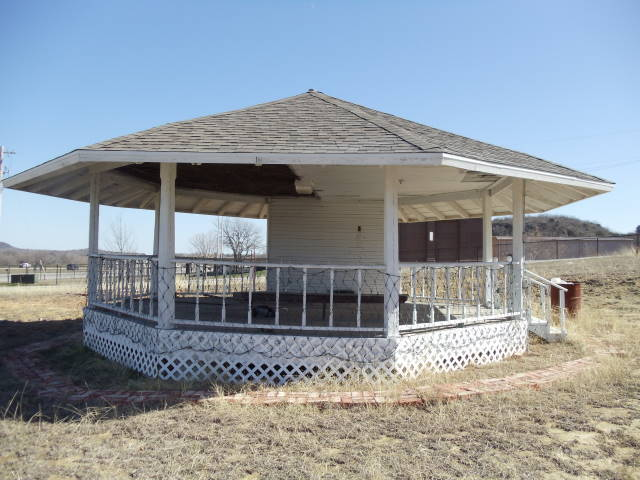
Bandstand

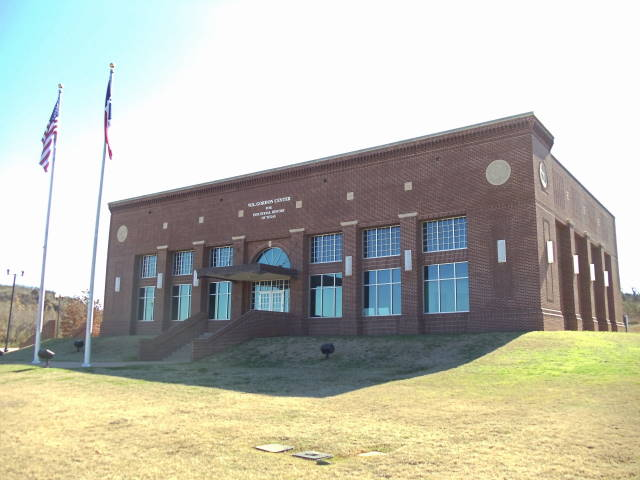
W. K. Gordon Center for Industrial History of Texas

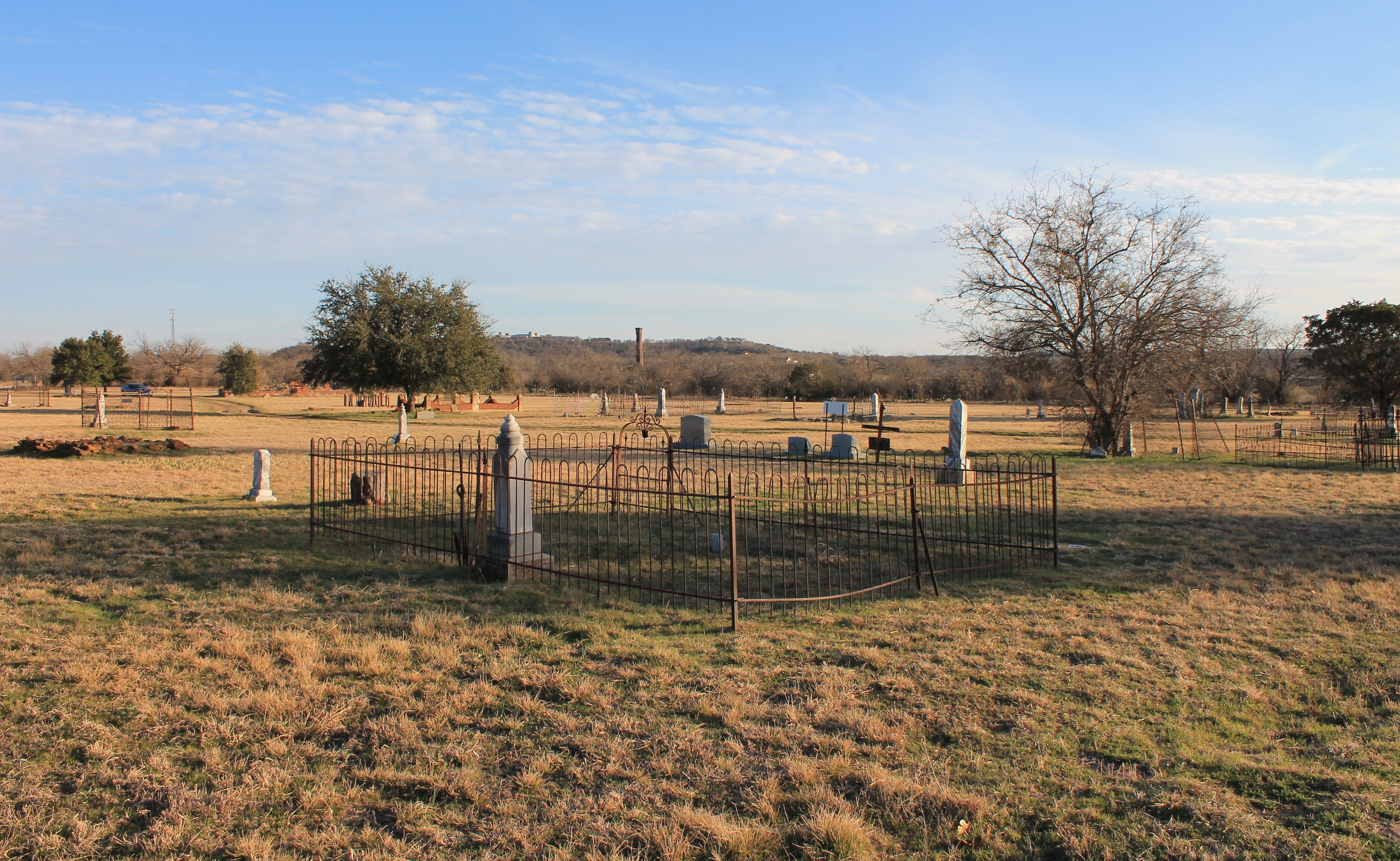
Thurber Cemetery

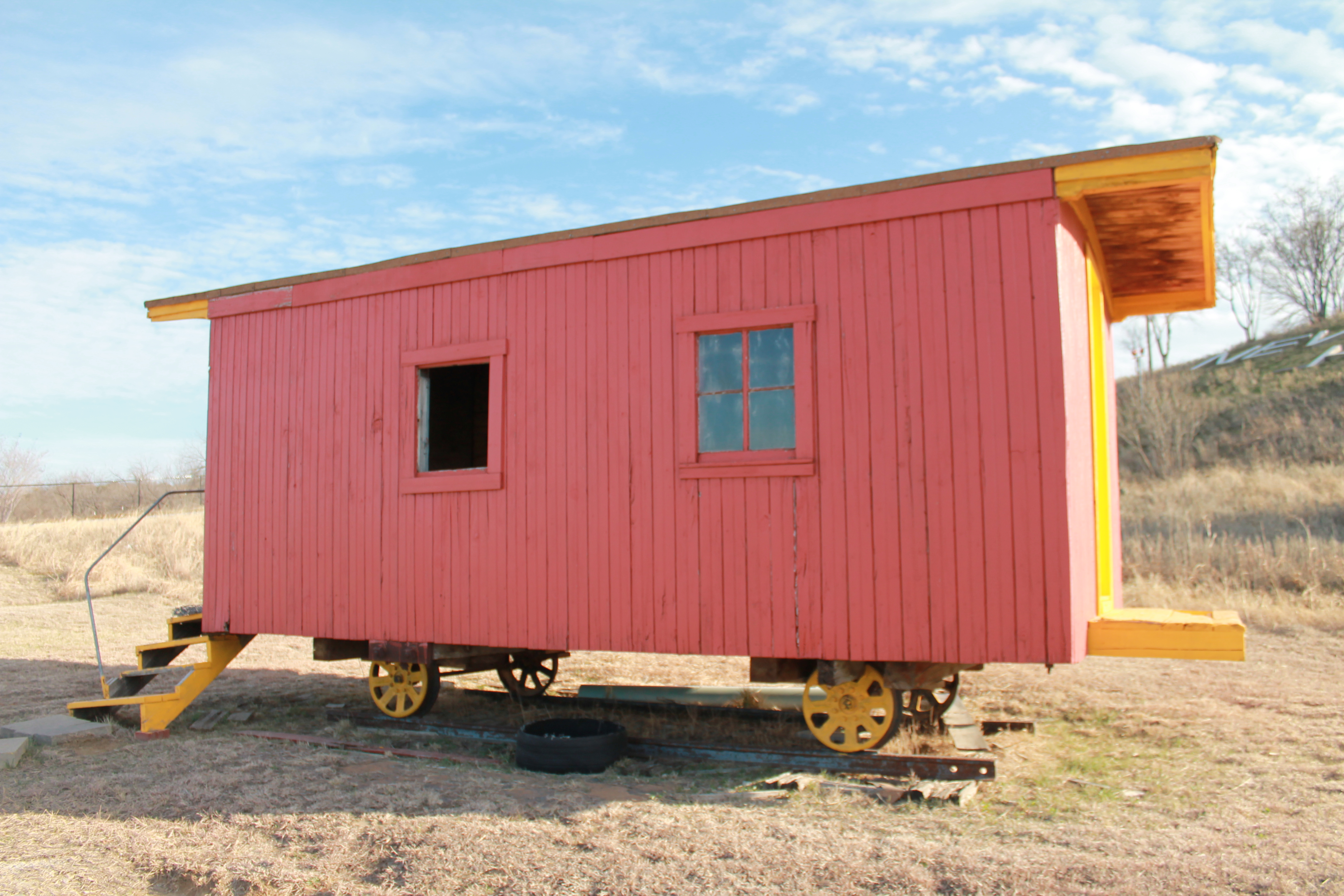
Rail car

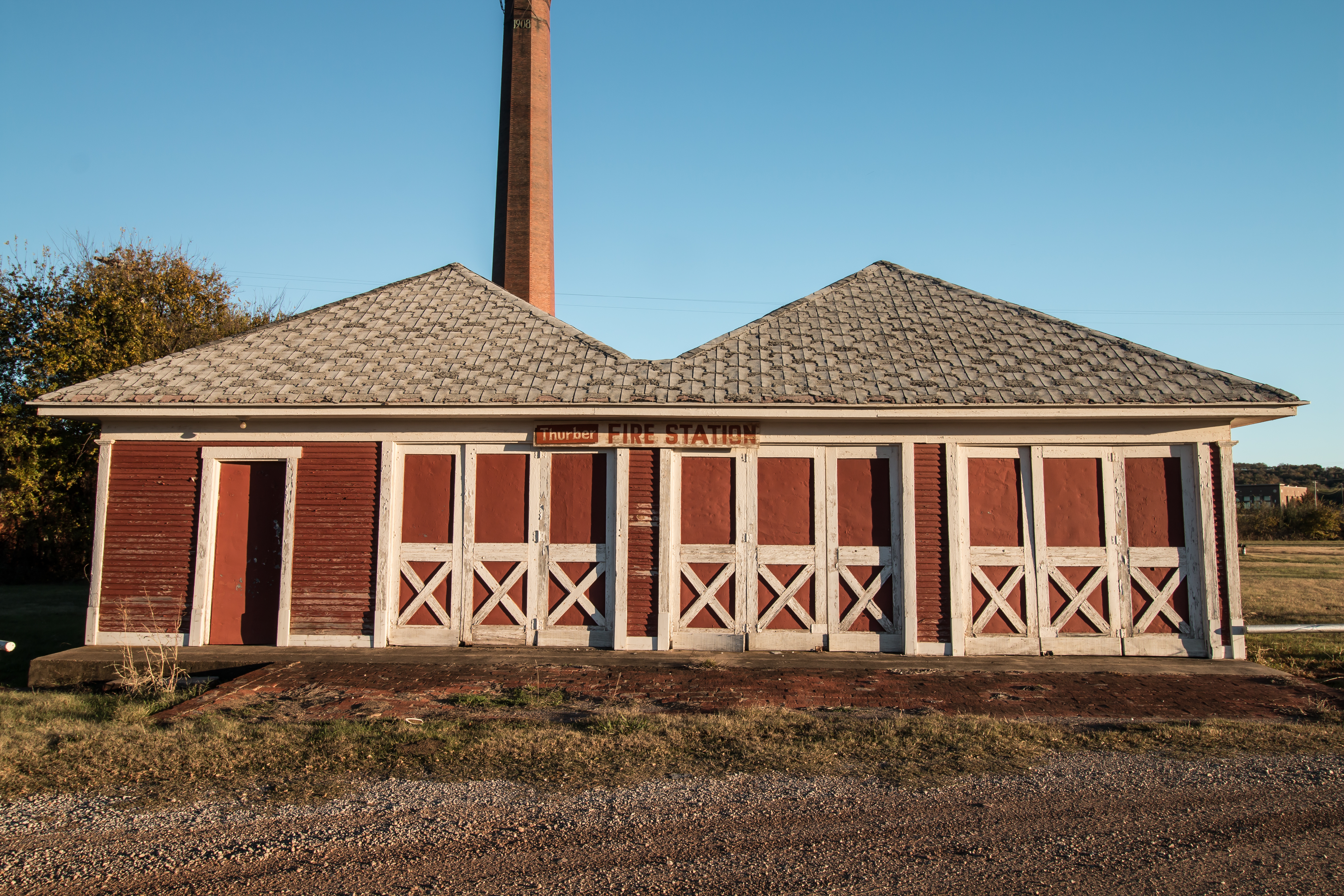
Thurber fire station

== See also ==
- National Register of Historic Places listings in Erath County, Texas
- List of ghost towns in Texas
