= Ranger High School =

Location
- 1842 Loop 254 East; Ranger, Texas 76470-9802; United States; 32.471133°N 98.651466°W

Information
- School type: Public high school
- School district: Ranger Independent School District
- Principal: Simon Simececk
- Staff: 13.38 (FTE)
- Grades: 9-12
- Enrollment: 73 (2023–2024)
- Student to teacher ratio: 5.53
- Colors: Maroon & White
- Athletics conference: UIL Class 1A
- Mascot: Bulldog
- Website: Ranger High School website

Ranger High School is a public high school located in Ranger, Texas, United States and classified as a 1A school by the UIL. It is part of the Ranger Independent School District located in eastern Eastland County. In 2011, the school was rated "Met Standard" by the Texas Education Agency.

== Athletics ==
The Ranger Bulldogs compete in the following sports

- Baseball
- Basketball
- Cross Country
- Football
- Golf
- Softball
- Track and Field
- Volleyball

=== State Titles ===
- Football
  - 1953(1A)
- Boys Golf
  - 1956(B)

== Notable Alumnus ==
Walter Prescott Webb (1888-1963), historian of the American West and author of the classic The Great Plains (1931)

== See also ==
- 1935 Sun Bowl
