= Strawn Formation =

Geologic formation in Texas

- Stratigraphic range: Middle Pennsylvanian
- Type: Formation
- Area: Bend Arch; Fort Worth Syncline; Llano Uplift; Permian Basin (North America); Strawn Basin

Location
- Region: Texas, New Mexico
- Country: United States

Type section
- Named for: The town of Strawn in Palo Pinto County, Texas

The Strawn Formation is a geologic formation in Texas and New Mexico. According to Cummins (1891), the formation was named from the town of Strawn in Palo Pinto County, Texas. It preserves fossils dating back to the Carboniferous period.

== See also ==
- List of fossiliferous stratigraphic units in Texas
- Paleontology in Texas
