= 1934 Pittsburgh Panthers football team =

American college football season

1934 Pittsburgh Panthers football
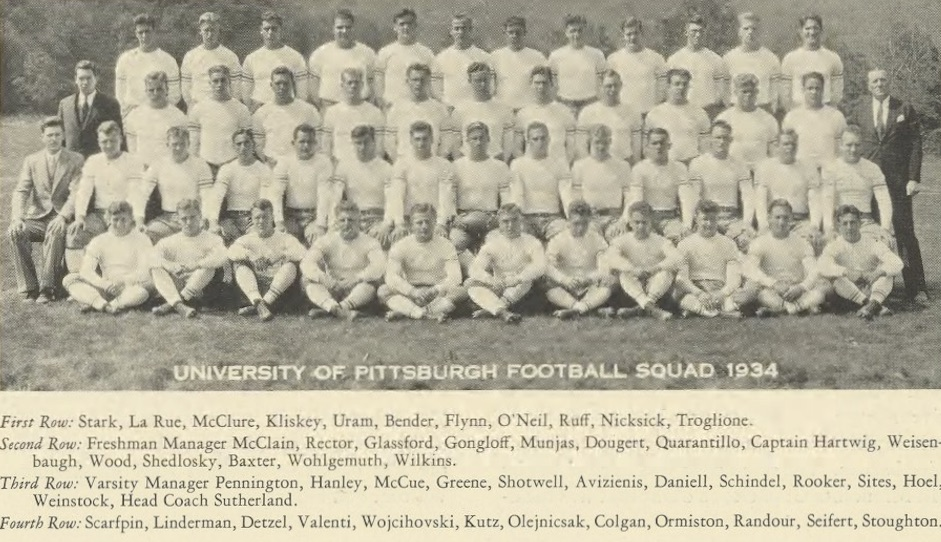

National champion (Davis) Eastern champion
- Conference: Independent
- Record: 8–1
- Head coach: Jock Sutherland (11th season)
- Offensive scheme: Single-wing
- Captain: Charles Hartwig
- Home stadium: Pitt Stadium

1934 Eastern college football independents records
	Conf.			Overall
Team	W	L	T	W		L		T
Tufts		–		8	–	0	–	0
Trinity (CT)		–		7	–	0	–	0
La Salle		–		7	–	0	–	1
Washington College		–		5	–	0	–	1
Franklin & Marshall		–		8	–	1	–	0
No. 4 Pittsburgh		–		8	–	1	–	0
No. 8 Colgate		–		7	–	1	–	0
Columbia		–		7	–	1	–	0
No. 5 Princeton		–		7	–	1	–	0
Duquesne		–		8	–	2	–	0
Holy Cross		–		8	–	2	–	0
No. 15 Temple		–		7	–	1	–	2
No. 10 Syracuse		–		6	–	2	–	0
Bucknell		–		7	–	2	–	2
No. 14 Army		–		7	–	3	–	0
Northeastern		–		6	–	1	–	1
Rochester		–		5	–	2	–	0
Dartmouth		–		6	–	3	–	0
Saint Anselm		–		6	–	3	–	0
Amherst		–		5	–	3	–	0
Fordham		–		5	–	3	–	0
Yale		–		5	–	3	–	0
Massachusetts State		–		5	–	3	–	1
CCNY		–		4	–	3	–	0
Providence		–		4	–	3	–	0
Drexel		–		4	–	3	–	1
Boston College		–		5	–	4	–	0
Bates		–		3	–	3	–	1
Middlebury		–		3	–	3	–	1
Penn		–		4	–	4	–	0
Penn State		–		4	–	4	–	0
Williams		–		4	–	4	–	0
Carnegie Tech		–		4	–	5	–	0
Washington & Jefferson		–		4	–	5	–	0
Villanova		–		3	–	4	–	2
NYU		–		3	–	4	–	1
Boston University		–		3	–	4	–	0
Colby		–		3	–	4	–	0
Springfield		–		2	–	3	–	3
Manhattan		–		3	–	5	–	1
Harvard		–		3	–	5	–	0
Vermont		–		2	–	4	–	2
Wesleyan		–		3	–	5	–	0
Brown		–		3	–	6	–	0
Geneva		–		2	–	5	–	2
Saint Joseph's		–		2	–	5	–	1
Cornell		–		2	–	5	–	0
Lafayette		–		2	–	6	–	0
Norwich		–		2	–	6	–	0
Bowdoin		–		0	–	6	–	1
Lowell Textile		–		0	–	7	–	1
Rankings from Associated Press

The 1934 Pittsburgh Panthers football team, coached by Jock Sutherland, represented the University of Pittsburgh as an independent during the 1934 college football season. The Panthers finished the regular season with eight wins and a single loss (to Minnesota at home) and were considered the champions of the East. According to a 1967 Sports Illustrated article, Parke H. Davis, whose selections for 1869 to 1933 (all made in 1933) are recognized as "major" in the official NCAA football records book, named Pitt as one of that season's national champions, along with Minnesota, six months after his death on June 5, 1934. The article contained a "list of college football's mythical champions as selected by every recognized authority [sic] since 1924," which has served as the basis of the university's historical national championship claims, with Davis being the only major selector for three of them, including the posthumous 1934 pick (post-1933 selections are not "major").

== Schedule ==
Date	Opponent	Site	Result	Attendance	Source
September 29	Washington & Jefferson	Pitt Stadium; Pittsburgh, PA	W 26–6	15,000	
October 6	at West Virginia	Mountaineer Field; Morgantown, WV (rivalry)	W 27–6	18,000	
October 13	USC	Pitt Stadium; Pittsburgh, PA	W 20–6	55,000	
October 20	Minnesota	Pitt Stadium; Pittsburgh, PA	L 7–13	64,850	
October 27	at Westminster (PA)	Taggart Stadium; New Castle, PA	W 30–0	1,500	
November 3	Notre Dame^{†}	Pitt Stadium; Pittsburgh, PA	W 19–0	64,000	
November 10	at Nebraska	Memorial Stadium; Lincoln, NE	W 25–6	32,875–35,000	
November 17	at Navy	Thompson Stadium; Annapolis, MD	W 31–7	25,000	
November 29	Carnegie Tech	Pitt Stadium; Pittsburgh, PA	W 20–0	35,562	
^{†}Homecoming

== Preseason ==
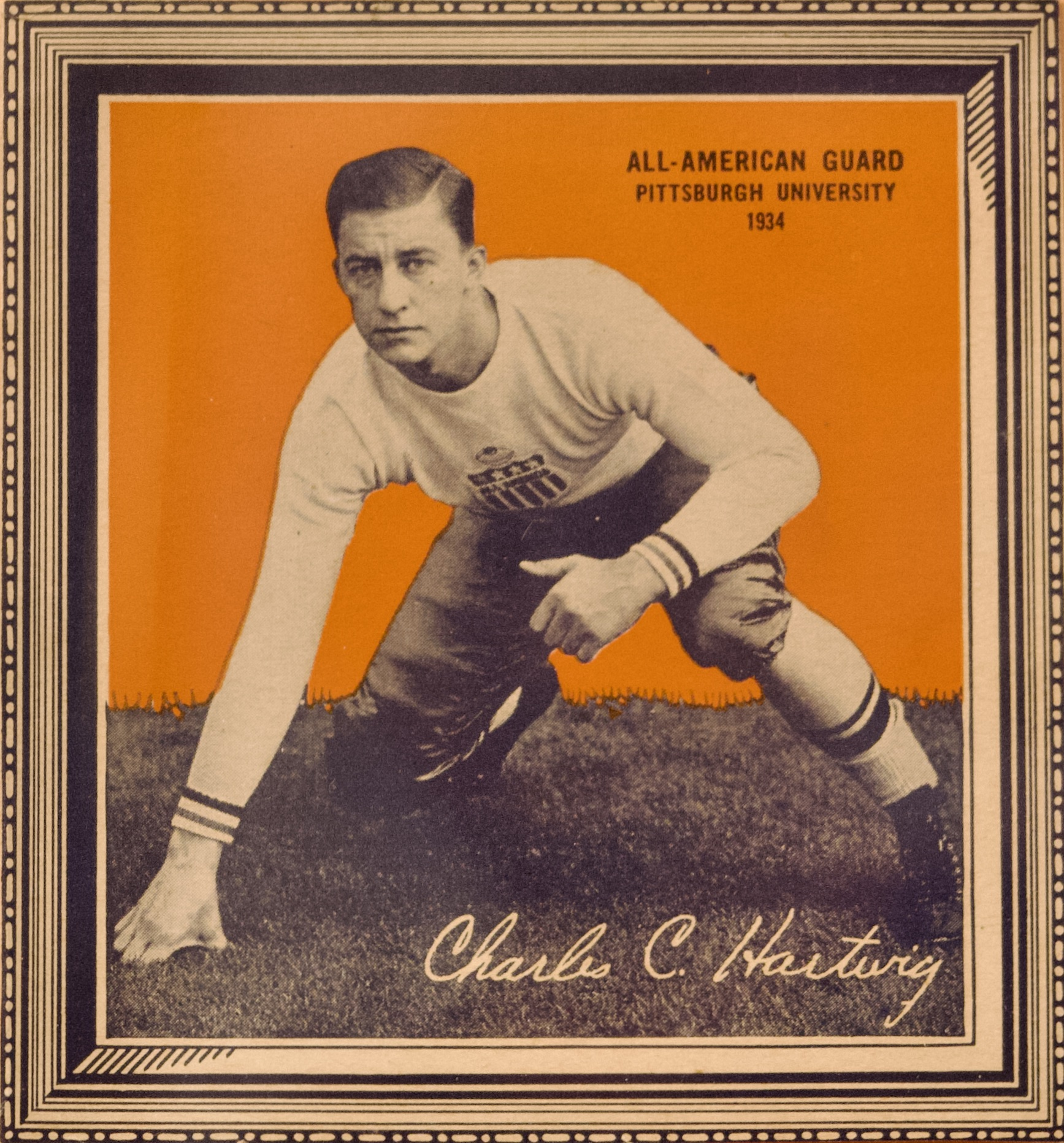
1934 Pitt captain Charles Hartwig

The Pitt coaching staff underwent some off-season changes. Assistant coach Andy Gustafson was hired at Dartmouth University, Bill Kern was promoted to head assistant coach and Dr. Eddie Baker became the head backfield coach. Staffing was completed on February 5, with the appointments of Walter Milligan and Howard O'Dell by the athletic committee. Milligan coached the guards and O'Dell assisted Eddie Baker with the backfield.

The yearly stipend given to the football recruits was increased from $400 to $480 for the 1934 season.

Prior to spring football practice, Coach Sutherland and his staff held daily meetings at the stadium by position. Each player attended one meeting per week. One night was for centers, one night for tackles and so forth.

Coach Sutherland needed to replace 14 Panther players (8 of whom were regulars) who would graduate in June (Robert Hogan, Joseph Skladany, Tarciscio Onder, Frank Walton, James Simms, Frank Tiernan, Arthur Craft, Howard Gelini, Robert Timmons, John Meredith, Richard Matesic, Mike Sebastian, Howard O'Dell and John Love). On March 15, his task began in earnest with the arrival of 73 candidates to the first spring practice session. 41 members of the varsity and 32 rising sophomores from last year's freshman team reported. Another twenty or so were expected in a few days. Coach Sutherland was his usual cautious self: "There are some good prospects for the team, but it is a question of teaching them football. What we learn this spring will mean a lot next fall when we meet Washington and Jefferson, West Virginia, Southern California, Minnesota, Westminster, Nebraska, Notre Dame, Carnegie Tech, and Navy. We can hope for a fair season." On May 5, the varsity concluded the spring practice period with a game against an alumni team. The varsity prevailed 14 to 0.

On September 9, fifty potential squad members bussed to Camp Hamilton for 2 weeks of preseason conditioning in order to prepare for the hardest schedule of coach Sutherland's eleven year career at Pitt. "Jock immediately launched the most intensive preliminary training period that a Pitt squad has experienced, with the result that the players quickly rounded into splendid physical condition and were in near mid-season form when the schedule opened." On the last morning of camp, the varsity defeated the reserves 40 to 0 in a full game scrimmage. After lunch the Panther entourage returned to Pittsburgh for the start of the fall semester.

The Panther athletic department reinstated the 25 cents admittance price for children. "We hope to be able to admit the youngsters for every game, although reservations for one or two of the big contests may interfere," Director W. Don Harrison declared.

== Coaching staff ==
1934 Pittsburgh Panthers football staff
Coaching staff: John B. "Jock" Sutherland – Head coach; Bill Kern – Assistant coach; Ralph N. Daugherty – Assistant coach - center; Walter Milligan – Assistant coach - guards; Edward Baker – backfield coach; Howard O'Dell – Assistant coach – backfield; Edward Hirshberg – Assistant coach-ends; Roscoe “Skip” Gougler – Freshman coach	Support staff: Dr. Ralph Shanor – team physician; George Moore – team trainer; Percy S. Browne – custodian of equipment; W. D. Harrison - director of athletics; James Hagan – graduate manager of athletics; Frank Carver – publicity director; Jess Pennington – varsity student manager; Clifton McClain – freshman team manager

== Roster ==
1934 Pittsburgh Panthers football roster
Player	Position	Games	Height	Weight	Class	Prep School	Hometown
Charles Hartwig*	guard	9	5' 11"	170	1935	Warwood H. S.	Wheeling, WV
Robert Hoel*	tackle	9	5' 11"	193	1935	Evanston Twp. H. S.	Evanston, IL
George Shotwell*	center	9	5' 10"	165	1935	Hanover Twp. H. S.	Wilkes-Barre, PA
Ken Ormiston*	guard	8	5' 11"	174	1935	Kiski School	Pittsburgh, PA
Stanley Olejnicsak*	tackle	8	5' 11"	180	1935	Bellaire H. S.	Bellaire, OH
Miller Munjas*	halfback	9	5' 10"	160	1935	Bellaire H. S.	Bellaire, OH
Isadore Weinstock*	fullback	9	6'	194	1936	Coughlin H. S.	Wilkes-Barre, PA
Karl P. Seiffert*	end	6	6'	175	1935	Jeannette H. S.	Jeannette, PA
Arthur Detzel*	tackle	7	5' 10"	189	1936	Erie East H. S.	Erie, PA
Frank W. Kutz*	guard	8	6'	180	1935	Montgomery School	McKeesport, PA
Nicholas Kliskey*	fullback	9	5' 7"	186	1935	Scott H. S.	North Braddock, PA
William Glassford*	guard	9	5' 9"	180	1936	Lancaster H. S.	Lancaster, Ohio
Verne Baxter*	end	7	5' 10"	170	1936	Oliver H. S.	Joliet, IL
Leon Shedlosky*	halfback	8	5' 9"	165	1936	Nanticoke H. S.	Nanticoke, PA
John Valenti	tackle	4	6' 2"	230	1935	Pierce School (Phila.)	Media, PA
Leslie C. Wilkins	center	5	5' 10"	178	1935	Kiski School	Rock Falls, IL
Arnold Greene*	quarterback	7	6' 1"	195	1937	Huntingdon H. S.	Huntingdon, PA
Hubert Randour*	halfback	9	5' 11"	168	1936	McDonald H. S.	McDonald, PA
Edward Quarantillo*	end	9	5' 11"	175	1937	Niagara Falls H. S.	Niagara Falls, NY
Averell Daniell*	tackle	9	6' 1"	193	1937	Mt. Lebanon H. S.	Mt. Lebanon, PA
Marwood Stark	guard	7	5' 10"	169	1936	Allentown H. S.	Allentown, PA
Harvey E. Rooker*	end	9	6' 1"	179	1935	Tarentum H. S.	Tarentum, PA
Charles Gongloff	center	4	5' 10"	170	1935	Nanty-Glo H. S.	Nanty-Glo, PA
Sam Uram	guard	0	5' 10"	170	1937	Turtle Creek Union	Turtle Creek, PA
Vincent Sites*	end	6	6' 1"	189	1936	St. John's H. S.	Pittston, PA
Louis Wojcihovski	end	1	6' 1"	170	1935	Weston H. S.	Weston, WV
Robert McClure*	quarterback	7	5' 8"	157	1937	Greenville H. S.	Greenville, PA
Michael Nicksick*	halfback	9	5' 10"	164	1935	Burgettstown H. S.	Burgettstown, PA
Joseph Troglione	halfback	4	5' 9"	164	1936	Wilkinsburg H. S.	Wilkinsburg, PA
Leonard Rector	fullback	7	5' 9"	175	1936	Avella H. S.	Avella, PA
Regis Flynn	end	1	5' 9"	156	1937	McKeesport H. S.	McKeesport, PA
Leo Malarkey	halfback	6	5' 10"	165	1937	McDonald H. S.	McDonald, PA
Peter Avizienus	tackle	0	6' 1"	193	1937	Mt. Carmel H. S.	Mt. Carmel, PA
Vincent Hanley	tackle	0	6'	190	1937	Altoona H. S.	Altoona, PA
James Scarfpin	guard	0	5' 10"	180	1937	Altoona H. S.	Martins Ferry, OH
Leon Wohlgemuth	guard	6	5' 10"	179	1937	Bellaire H. S.	Bellaire, OH
Cleon Linderman	center	0	6'	177	1937	Allegheny H. S.	Allegheny, NY
Walter Balasia	quarterback	1	5' 10"	160	1935	Hanover Twp. H. S.	Wilkes-Barre, PA
John Wood	halfback	0	5' 10"	160	1937	Magrotta H. S.	New Martinsville, WV
John Dougert	halfback	0	5' 8"	160	1937	Shenandoah H. S.	Shenandoah, PA
Maurice Steele	fullback	0	5' 9"	180	1937	Clairton H. S.	Clairton, PA
Gene Stoughton	guard	2	5' 11"	180	1936	Oil City H. S.	Oil City, PA
Arthur Ruff*	halfback	1	5' 9"	150	1935	Etna H. S.	Etna, PA
Arthur Schindel	end	0	6'	174	1936	Aurora H. S.	Aurora, IL
Adolph Bender	halfback	0	5' 9"	160	1937	Scott H. S.	North Braddock, PA
Earl McCue	guard	0	6' 1"	185	1936	Wilkinsburg H. S.	Wilkinsburg, PA
Henry A. Weisenbaugh*	halfback	9	5' 10"	174	1935	Tarentum H. S.	Tarentum, PA
Robert LaRue*	halfback	9	5' 9"	160	1936	Wyoming Seminary	Greensburg, PA
Stanley O'Neil	halfback	6	5' 8"	170	1937	Steubenville H. S.	Steubenville, OH
Ozro Colgan	center	0	6'	189	1937		Homestead, PA
Jess Pennington*	varsity student manager				1935	Bethel H. S.	Bethel, OH
Clifton McClain*	freshman team student manager				1935	Perry H. S.	Pittsburgh, PA
* Letterman

== Game summaries ==
=== Washington & Jefferson ===
Week 1: Washington & Jefferson at Pitt

Team	1	2	3	4	Total
Washington & Jefferson	0	0	6	0	6
• Pitt	0	13	0	13	26

- Date: September 29, 1934
- Location: Pitt Stadium
  Pittsburgh, PA
- Game start: 2:00 p.m.
- Game attendance: 15,000
- Game weather: rain
- Referee: Dexter W. Very (Penn State)

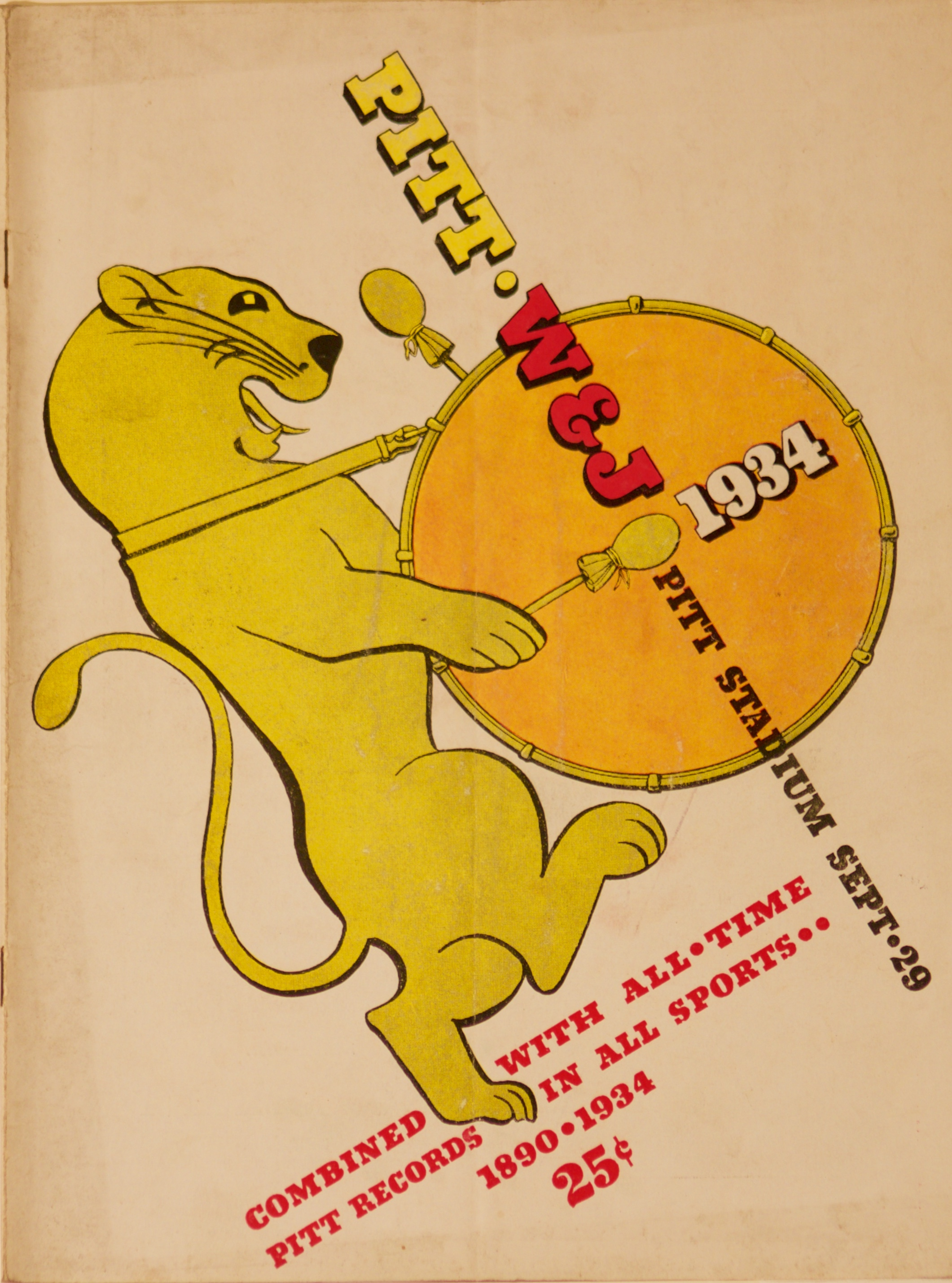
Program for September 29 game vs. Washington & Jefferson

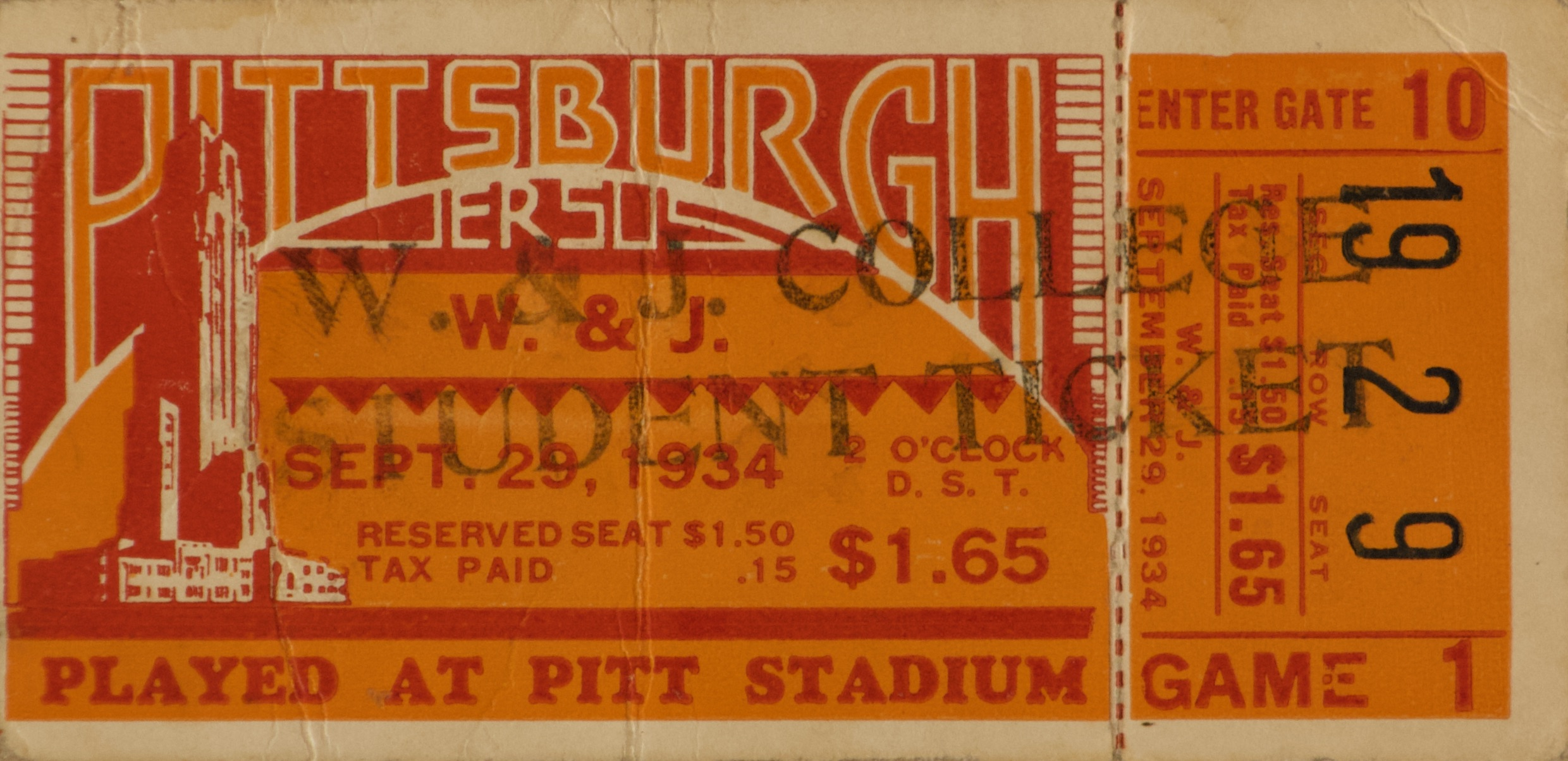
Ticket stub for September 29 game versus W. & J.

On September 29, Pitt and W. & J. met for the last time at Pitt Stadium. This was the thirty-second all-time meeting and Pitt led the series 16–13–2. The Presidents last won in 1924 and had not scored against Pitt in the previous 6 outings. Third-year coach Hank Day hoped to improve on the previous year's 2–7–1 record. Coach Day opined: "You can't build a brick house without bricks. We haven't got the man power to beat Pitt and all I hope is we keep the score down to respectable size."

Despite losing 8 starters and 6 reserves to graduation, coach Sutherland's lineup for the opening game against the Presidents listed 10 veterans and one sophomore - halfback (Bobby LaRue).

15,000 fans sat through a steady rainfall to watch the Panthers beat the Presidents 26–6. Pitt gained 317 yards and 18 first downs to W. & J.'s 163 yards and 3 first downs. After a scoreless first quarter, Pitt back Bobby LaRue returned a punt to the Presidents 39-yard line. On first down Leo Malarkey lost 4 yards. On second down Henry Weisenbaugh raced 43 yards for the first touchdown of the season. Isadore Weinstock converted the point after and Pitt led 7 to 0. The Panther defense held and Pitt regained possession on their own 45-yard line. A nine play, 55-yard drive ended with a 1-yard plunge into the end zone by Weinstock for Pitt's second touchdown. He missed the placement, but Pitt led at the half 13 to 0. Pitt drove the ball to the Presidents' 13-yard line on the opening drive of the third quarter but lost the ball on downs. On first down W. & J. halfback Don Croft sprinted 87 yards around end for the first W. & J. touchdown against Pitt since 1924. He missed the point after and the score read: Pitt 13 to W. & J. 6. After an exchange of punts, Pitt gained possession on their own 45-yard line. When the quarter ended the Panthers were on the W. & J. 3-yard line. "On the first play Weinstock battered right guard for a touchdown. Weinstock's try for the extra point was wide, but W. & J. was offside and Pitt was awarded the point. Score: Pitt 20; W. & J. 6." The Presidents advanced the ball to the Pitt 35-yard line, but turned it over on downs. The Panther offense proceeded to march 65 yards in three plays. Leon Shedlosky carried the ball the final 26 yards for the touchdown. Robert McClure missed the point after. Final score: Pitt 26; W. & J. 6.

The Pitt starting lineup for the game against Washington & Jefferson was Harvey Rooker (left end), Robert Hoel (left tackle), Charles Hartwig (left guard), George Shotwell (center), Ken Ormiston (right guard), Arthur Detzel (right tackle), Verne Baxter (right end), Miller Munjas (quarterback), Mike Nicksick (left halfback), Bobby LaRue (right halfback) and Isadore Weinstock (fullback). Substitutes appearing in the game for Pitt were Edward Quarantillo, John Valenti, William Glassford, Nick Kliskey, Marwood Stark, Averell Daniell, Karl Seiffert, Robert McClure, Arnold Greene, Leo Malarkey, Hub Randour, Leon Shedlosky, Stanley O'Neil, Henry Weisenbaugh and Leonard Rector.

Scoring summary

Quarter	Time	Drive			Team	Scoring information	Score	
Quarter	Time	Plays	Yards	TOP	Team	Scoring information	Washington & Jefferson	Pittsburgh
2		2	39		Pittsburgh	Henry Weisenbaugh 43-yard touchdown run, Isadore Weinstock kick good	0	7
2		9	55		Pittsburgh	Weinstock 1-yard touchdown run, Weinstock kick no good	0	13
3		1	87		Washington & Jefferson	Don Croft 87-yard touchdown run, Croft kick no good	6	13
4		8	55		Pittsburgh	Weinstock 3-yard touchdown run, Weinstock kick good by virtue of offside penalty	6	20
4		3	65		Pittsburgh	Leon Shedlosky 26-yard touchdown run, Robert McClure kick no good	6	26
"TOP" = time of possession. For other American football terms, see Glossary of American football.							6	26

=== At West Virginia ===
Week 2: Pitt at West Virginia

Team	1	2	3	4	Total
• Pitt	7	7	0	13	27
West Virginia	0	0	6	0	6

- Date: October 6, 1934
- Location: Mountaineer Field
  Morgantown, WV
- Game start: 2:30 p.m.
- Game attendance: 18,000
- Game weather: sunny and cold
- Referee: Russell B. Goodwin (W. & J.)

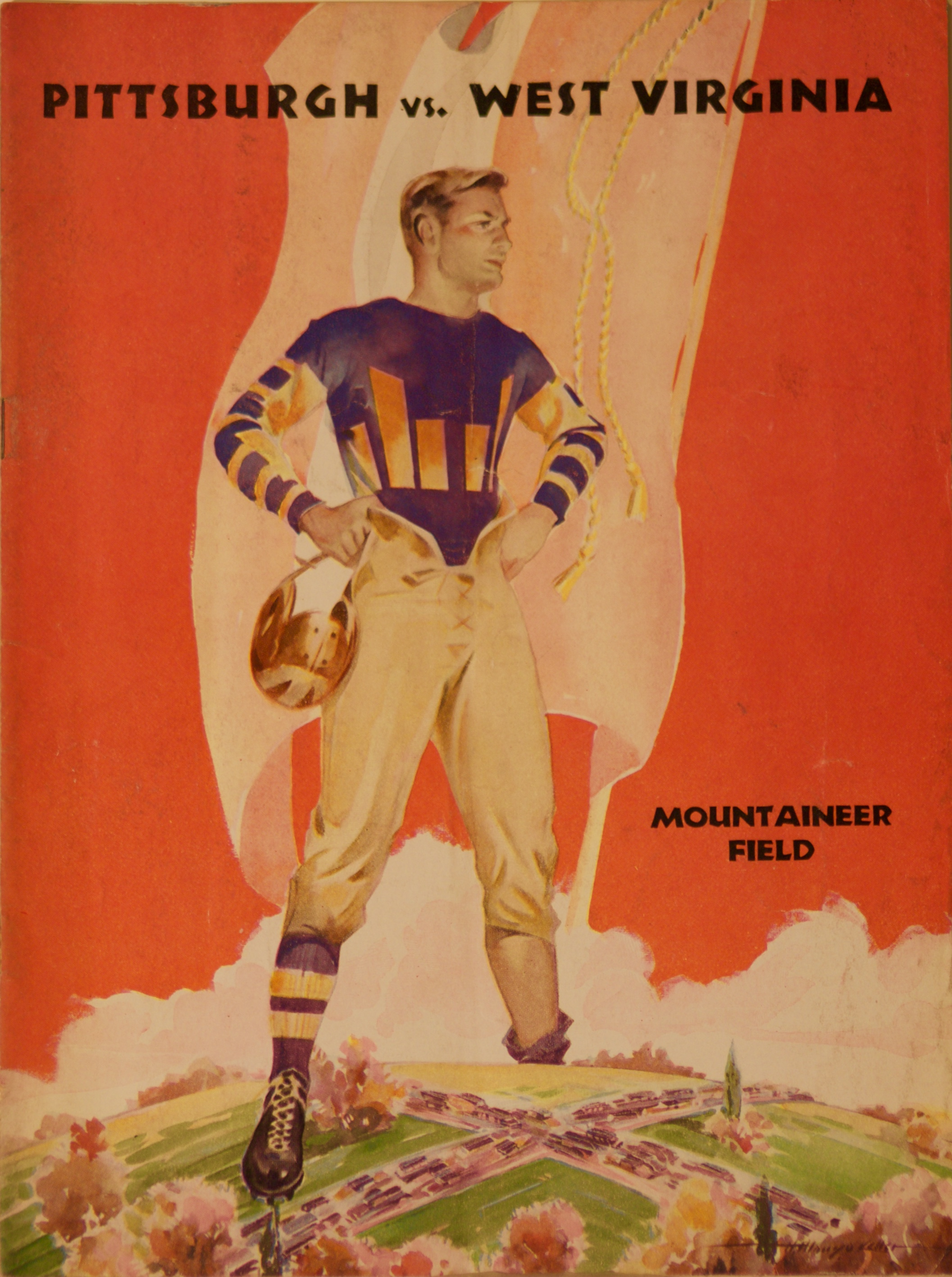
Program for the October 6 game vs. West Virginia

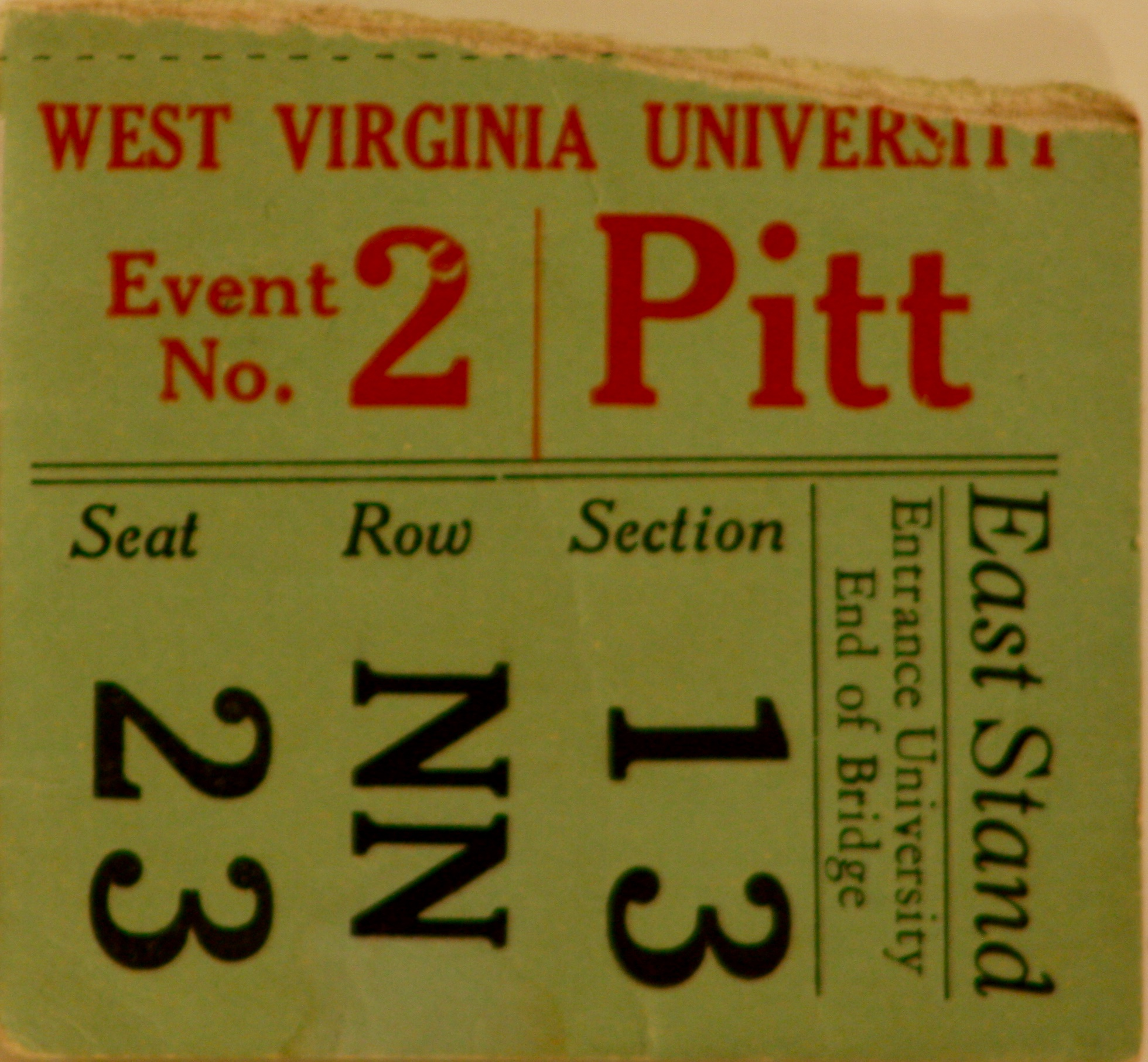
Ticket stub for October 6 game vs. West Virginia

For the third year in a row, the Panthers traveled to Morgantown for their annual battle with the Mountaineers of West Virginia. Pitt led the series 20–8–1 and had won nine of the past 10 games. Coach Sutherland wanted his team to be more focused than they were in the W. & J. game, so the Panthers had a hard week of practice. The Panthers were healthy and the same lineup took the field to start the game.

The Mountaineers were led by first year coach Charles “Trusty” Tallman. He played end on the 1920-23 Mountaineer squads. He was the head coach at Marshall University from 1925-28 with a record of 22–9–7. He returned to Morgantown and coached the freshman team for five years prior to his appointment as head coach. West Virginia was 2–0 on the season with victories over West Virginia Wesleyan (19–0) at home and Duquesne (7–0) at Forbes Field. Jess Carver of the Sun-Telegraph noted: "So seriously has West Virginia taken the game that the new coach, Trusty Tallman, took his charges out of town yesterday afternoon into a nearby mountain retreat, something unheard of for so early in the season."

The Panthers disappointed the home team fans with a convincing 27–6 victory over the Mountaineers. The Pittsburgh Press noted: "Pitt made 16 first downs to three and not until the second half did the Mountaineers cross the 50-yard line." The Panthers' offense started their second possession from their own 37-yard line. On first down Bobby LaRue lost a yard. On second down Mike Nicksick threw a 64-yard touchdown pass to end Harvey Rooker. Isadore Weinstock converted the point after and Pitt led 7 to 0. In the second period, the Panther offense sustained a 72-yard drive that ended with a Leon Shedlosky 4-yard scamper to the end zone. Henry Weisenbaugh converted the point after and Pitt led 14 to 0 at halftime. The Mountaineers' fans had reason to cheer when a Eck Allen pass to Mickey Heath gained 56 yards to the Pitt 4-yard line. Allen bulled into the end zone on fourth down for the first West Virginia points against Pitt since 1929. Angelo Onder (brother of Pitt grad Tarciscio Onder) missed the placement. The Panther offense answered with two more touchdowns. A 77-yard drive culminated with a 35-yard end run by Weisenbaugh, and Verne Baxter caught a 40-yard touchdown pass from Leo Malarkey. Weisenbaugh converted one of the placements, and Pitt went home with a 27 to 6 victory.

The Mountaineers finished the season with a 6–4 record.

The Pitt starting lineup for the game against West Virginia was Harvey Rooker (left end), Robert Hoel (left tackle), Charles Hartwig (left guard), George Shotwell (center), Ken Ormiston (right guard), Arthur Detzel (right tackle), Verne Baxter (right end), Miller Munjas (quarterback), Mike Nicksick (left halfback), Bobby LaRue (right halfback) and Isadore Weinstock (fullback). Substitutes appearing in the game for Pitt were Edward Quarantillo, Leslie Wilkins, Averell Daniell, John Valenti, William Glassford, Leon Wohlgemuth, Nick Kliskey, Charles Gangloff, Frank Kutz, Marwood Stark, Stanley Olejniczak, Karl Seiffert, Vincent Sites, Louis Wojcihovski, Robert McClure, Arnold Greene, Leo Malarkey, Hub Randour, Joseph Troglione, Leon Shedlosky, Stanley O'Neil, Henry Weisenbaugh and Leonard Rector.

Scoring summary

Quarter	Time	Drive			Team	Scoring information	Score	
Quarter	Time	Plays	Yards	TOP	Team	Scoring information	Pittsburgh	West Virginia
1		2	63		Pittsburgh	Harvey Rooker 64-yard touchdown reception from Mike Nicksick, Isadore Weinstock kick good	7	0
2		8	72		Pittsburgh	Leon Shedlosky 4-yard touchdown run, Henry Weisenbaugh kick good	14	0
3		6	60		West Virginia	Eck Allen 1-yard touchdown run, Angelo Onder kick no good	14	6
4		7	77		Pittsburgh	Weisenbaugh 35-yard touchdown run, Weisenbaugh kick no good	20	6
4		1	40		Pittsburgh	Verne Baxter 40-yard touchdown reception from Leo Malarkey, Weisenbaugh kick good	27	6
"TOP" = time of possession. For other American football terms, see Glossary of American football.							27	6

=== USC ===
Week 3: USC at Pitt

Team	1	2	3	4	Total
USC	0	6	0	0	6
• Pitt	6	7	7	0	20

- Date: October 13, 1934
- Location: Pitt Stadium
  Pittsburgh, PA
- Game start: 2:00 p.m.
- Game attendance: 55,000
- Game weather: sunny and cool
- Referee: H. B. Hacket (Army)

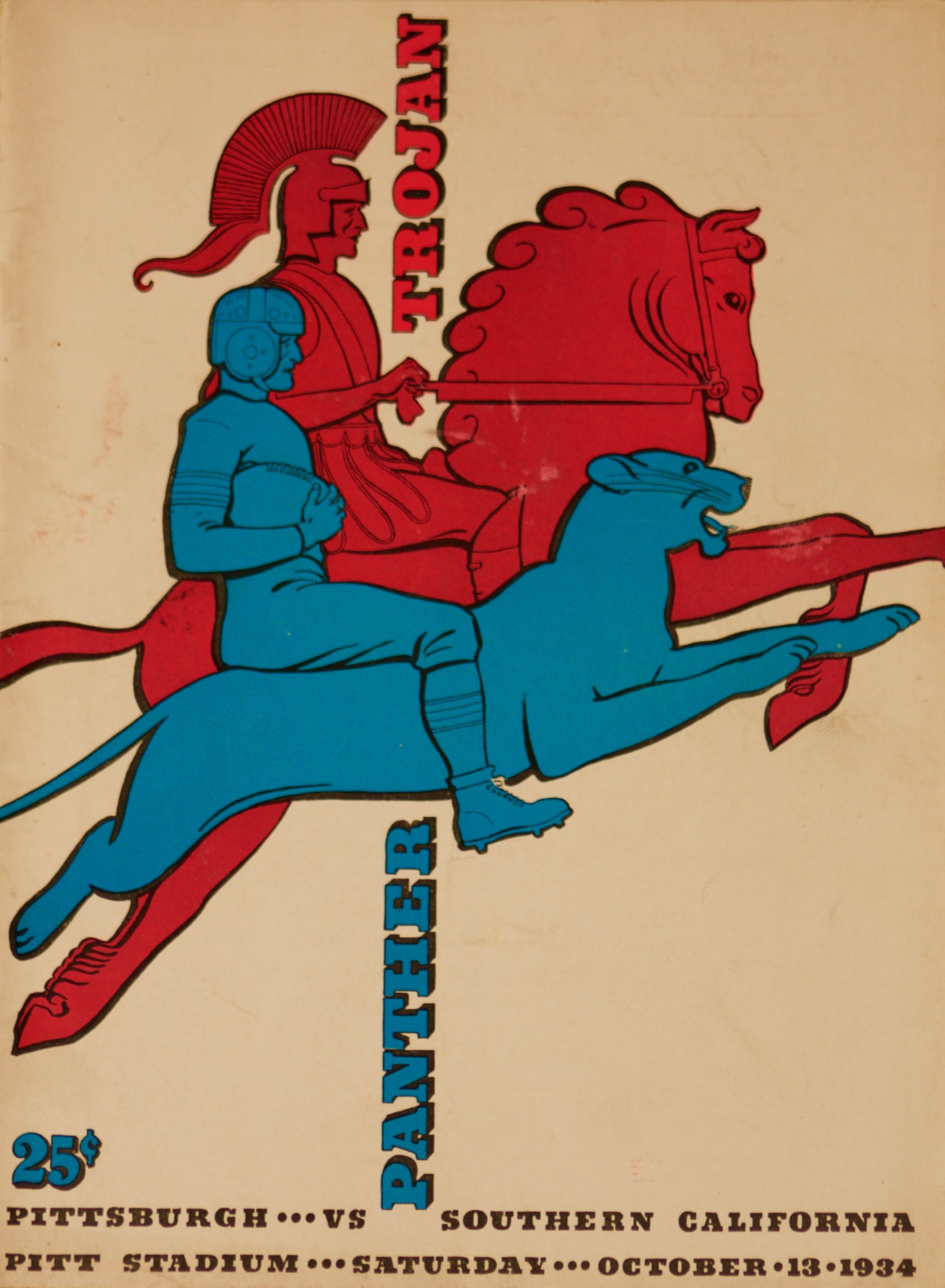
Program for October 13 game versus USC

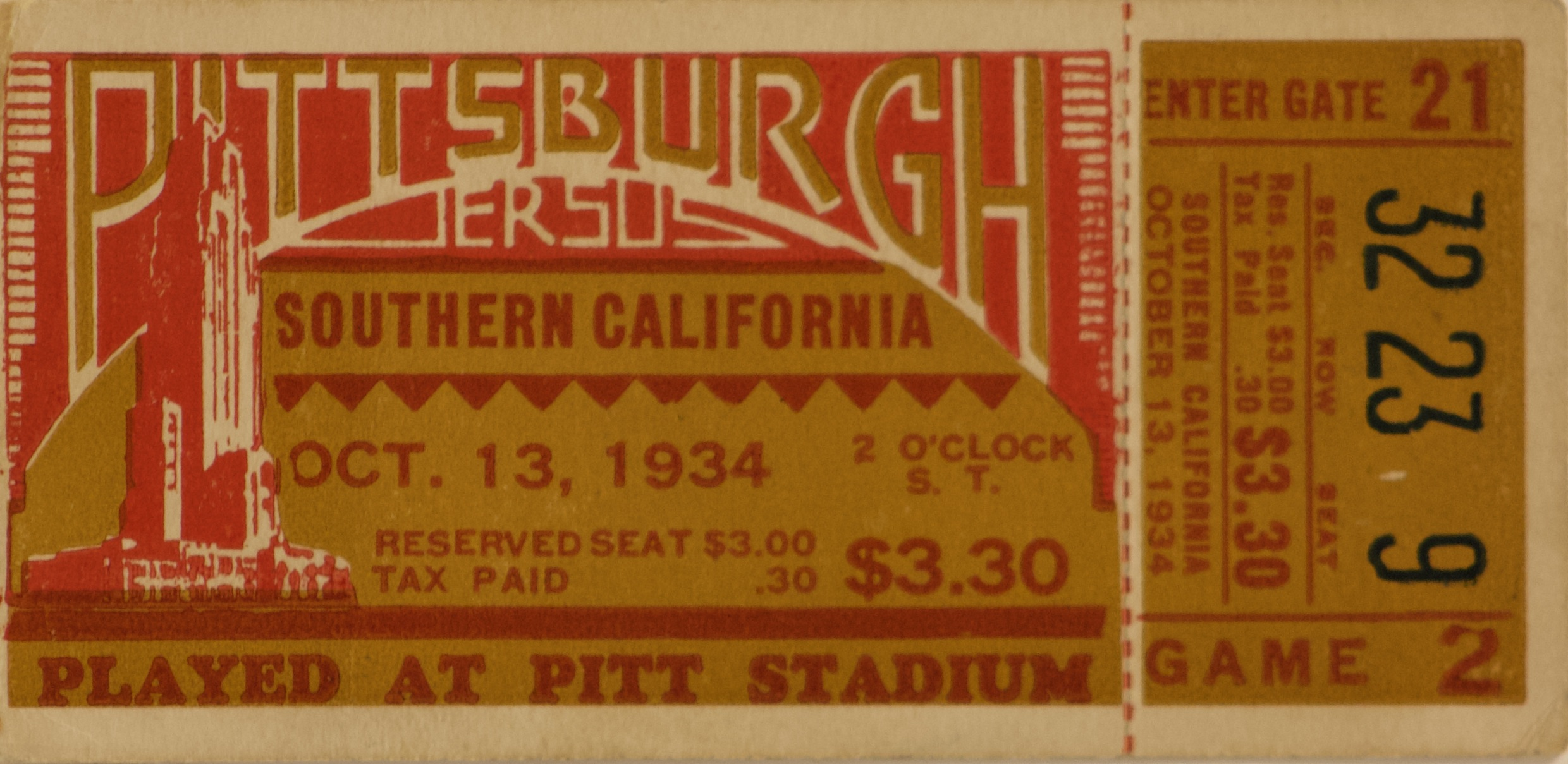
Ticket stub for October 13 game versus USC

On October 13, the Panthers welcomed the USC Trojans. USC had never been east of South Bend, IN to play football. Jock Sutherland and Pitt got shellacked by the Trojans in two Rose Bowl appearances (47–14 in 1930 and 35–0 in 1933). Jack Sell of the Post-Gazette noted: "A peek into the files reveals that ten Pitt players who are likely to see action today participated in the last meeting of these two schools, on January 2, 1933 in the Rose Bowl game at Pasadena. Captain Charles Hartwig, Weinstock, Rooker, Ormiston, Hoel, Shotwell, Wojcihovski, Munjas, Weisenbaugh and Nicksick all know just how it feels to lose by 35–0 and take the long train ride back home."

Howard Jones was in his tenth season as head coach of the Trojans. He had attained a record of 84–11–3. The Trojans came east with a 3–1 record on the season. They opened with three straight wins and then lost at home to Washington State (19–0). After that loss Jack Franklin, the editor of the school newspaper, the "Daily Trojan", wrote an editorial criticizing the effort of the team. He wrote members of the team "were Hollywood-struck boys who were as toys to some henna-haired film beauty or magnate." He added the loss to Washington State: "It marked the victory of a team that plays football for the game's sake over a team of Hollywood-struck boys who once knew how to play football, but having been persuaded that they are already all-Americans now only go through the motions. The handwriting has been on the wall for a long time." Coach Jones was not pleased nor were the players, but the coach admitted to the Pittsburgh Press: "That's the way they've been playing, I'm not alibiing for these boys, they'll have to play better than they have been."

In front of 55,000 fans, Pitt won the game 20 to 6. They became the only team other than Notre Dame to beat USC in an intersectional game. Plus, this was the first time a Howard Jones team lost 2 games straight in the same season.

The Panthers got on the scoreboard in the first quarter. Captain Charles Hartwig recovered Trojan halfback Clifford Probst's fumble on the USC 20-yard line. The Panther offense advanced the ball to the 1-yard line and Isadore Weinstock plunged into the end zone for the initial score. Weinstock missed the point after. Score: Pitt 6 to USC 0. In the second period the Panthers added to their score on a 22-yard touchdown dash by Henry Weisenbaugh. Weinstock converted the point after and Pitt led 13 to 0. The Trojans answered right before halftime with an 80-yard drive. USC quarterback Cotton Warburton completed a 6-yard pass to Calvin Clemens for the touchdown. Clemens' try for point was blocked by Pitt center George Shotwell. The halftime score read: Pitt 13 to USC 6. The Panthers managed another touchdown in the third stanza on one play after gaining possession by blocking a punt on the USC 35-yard line. Substitute halfback Hubert Randour passed to end Verne Baxter for the final touchdown of the game. Weinstock converted the point for the 20 to 0 win.

The editor of the "Daily Trojan" may have been correct as the USC Trojans never recovered their early season form and won only one more game, while finishing the season 4-6-1.

The Pitt starting lineup for the game against USC was Harvey Rooker (left end), Robert Hoel (left tackle), Charles Hartwig (left guard), George Shotwell (center), Ken Ormiston (right guard), Arthur Detzel (right tackle), Verne Baxter (right end), Miller Munjas (quarterback), Mike Nicksick (left halfback), Bobby LaRue (right halfback) and Isadore Weinstock (fullback). Substitutes appearing in the game for Pitt were Edward Quarantillo, Averell Daniell, William Glassford, Nick Kliskey, Frank Kutz, Stanley Olejniczak, Karl Sieffert, Robert McClure, Leo Malarkey, Hubert Randour and Henry Weisenbaugh.

Scoring summary

Quarter	Time	Drive			Team	Scoring information	Score	
Quarter	Time	Plays	Yards	TOP	Team	Scoring information	USC	Pittsburgh
1		6	20		Pittsburgh	Isadore Weinstock 1-yard touchdown run, Weinstock kick no good	0	6
2		3	39		Pittsburgh	Henry Weisenbaugh 22-yard touchdown run, Weinstock kick good	0	13
2		8	80		USC	Calvin Clemens 6-yard touchdown reception from Cotton Warburton, Clemens kick no good	6	13
3		1	35		Pittsburgh	Verne Baxter 35-yard touchdown reception from Hubert Randour, Weinstock kick good	6	20
"TOP" = time of possession. For other American football terms, see Glossary of American football.							6	20

=== Minnesota ===
Week 4: Minnesota at Pitt

Team	1	2	3	4	Total
• Minnesota	0	0	0	13	13
Pitt	0	7	0	0	7

- Date: October 20, 1934
- Location: Pitt Stadium
  Pittsburgh, PA
- Game start: 2:00 p.m.
- Game attendance: 65,000
- Game weather: sunny and hot
- Referee: W. G. Crowell (Swarthmore)

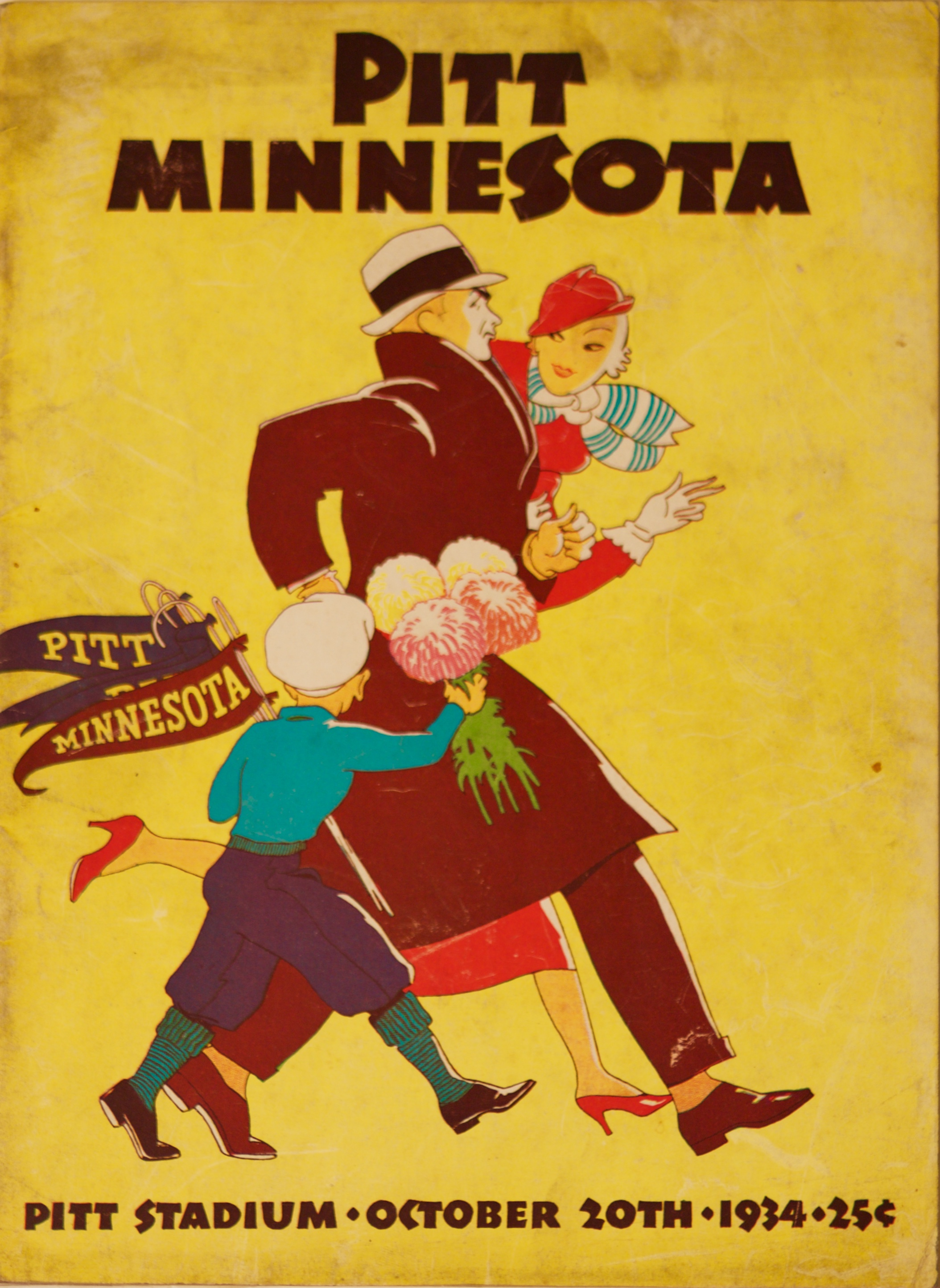
Program for October 20 game vs. Minnesota

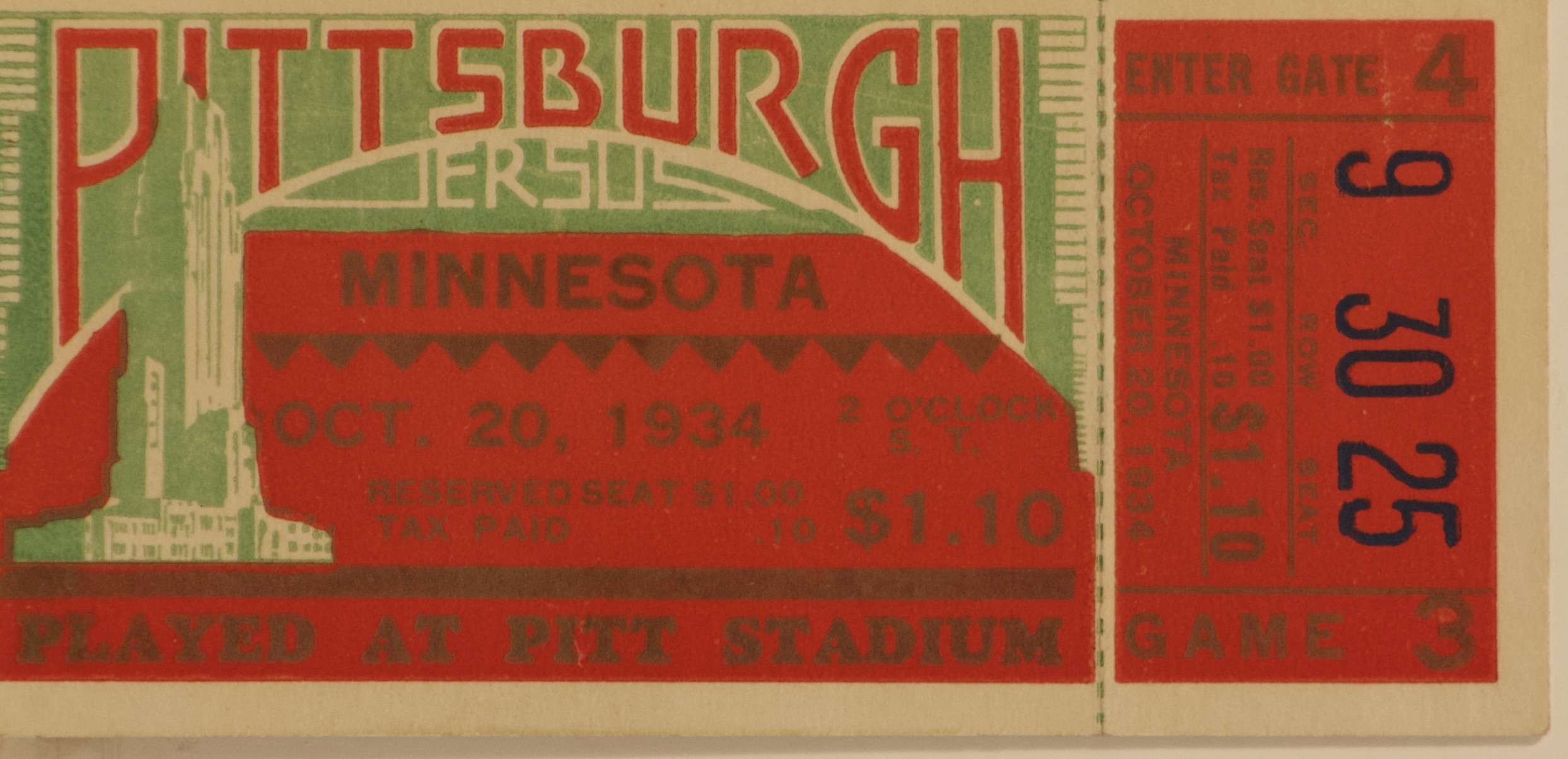
Ticket stub for October 20 game vs. Minnesota

On October 20, the Panthers played host to the Minnesota Gophers who were led by third-year coach Bernie Bierman. The Gophers were 2–0 on the season and on a 10 game unbeaten streak since the final game of 1932. The Gopher line-up featured three consensus All-Americans: halfback/fullback Pug Lund, end Frank Larson and guard Bill Bevan. Fullback Stan Kostka and tackle Phil Bengtson were named to the North American Newspaper Alliance second-team and end Bob Tenner made the United Press second-team. Coach Bierman told the Tribune: “My boys are in first class condition and an excellent spirit exists on the squad. If the boys go out there and play the brand of football of which they are capable, they should win. But they will have to play 60 minutes of great football.”

Coach Sutherland acknowledged that the Gophers should be favored, but felt the game would be close. Panther starting end Verne Baxter was sick and did not play. He was replaced by Karl Seiffert. Stanley Olejniczak started at right tackle in place of Arthur Detzel.

The Minnesota Gophers rallied in the final period to score two touchdowns, and crushed the Panther hopes of a national title with a 13 to 7 victory. The first quarter and most of the second was a punting duel between Gopher All-American Lund and Pitt quarterback Miller Munjas. Late in the second period Pitt gained possession on their own 36-yard line. On first down Isadore Weinstock ran 12 yards around left end and, prior to being tackled, he lateraled the ball to Mike Nicksick, who was trailing the play. Nicksick raced untouched to the end zone for the first score of the game. Weinstock was good on the placement and Pitt led 7 to 0 at halftime. Late in the third stanza, Pitt back Bobby LaRue fumbled Lund's punt and Gopher end Larson recovered for Minnesota on the Pitt 40-yard line. The Gopher offense advanced the ball to the Pitt 22-yard line as the third period came to a close. On the first play of the fourth quarter Julius Alfonse skirted left end for the first Gopher touchdown. Bevan tied the score with his point after. After the kick-off, the Panthers failed to make a first down and had to punt. The Gophers gained possession on their own 46-yard line. Six plays moved the ball to the Pitt 16-yard line. "A beautiful double lateral, Glen Seidel to Kostka to Lund, who threw a forward to Tenner, sent the latter racing around the right side for a touchdown. Bevan missed the try for point." Final score: Minnesota 13 to Pitt 7.

Chester L. Smith of The Press noted that 65,000 fans went home sad, but proud that the Pitt team fought to the bitter end. He added: "There were other thousands who were bitterly disappointed because Pitt athletic authorities ruled again against a nation-wide broadcast of the intersectional battle. The same ruling was made by Pitt wast[sic] week in the game between the Panthers and Southern California."

"During the first quarter, one of the Pitt cheer leader-acrobats attempted to chin himself on the west goal post crossbar. One end of the crossbar broke loose from an upright and sagged noticeably. The officials stopped the game until umpire Thorpe could climb the post and fasten the crossbar in place with a strip of trainer Bud Moore's adhesive tape."

Coach Sutherland praised the Gophers: "Minnesota impressed me very much. They are a really fine football team. We were afraid of their power, and our advance strategy was to keep them in the hole as long as possible. We did a good job of it in the first half, but one fumble got us in a jam, and then the Gophers went to work. ..I thought my boys played to the limit of their ability, but the Gophers were just too good for us."

Minnesota finished the season with an 8–0 record and shared the national championship with Alabama, the two having been chosen by all major selectors recognized by the NCAA.

The Pitt starting lineup for the game against Minnesota was Harvey Rooker (left end), Robert Hoel (left tackle), Charles Hartwig (left guard), George Shotwell (center), Ken Ormiston (right guard), Stanley Olejniczak (right tackle), Karl Seiffert (right end), Miller Munjas (quarterback), Mike Nicksick (left halfback), Bobby LaRue (right halfback) and Isadore Weinstock (fullback). Sugstitutes appearing in the game for Pitt were Edward Quarantillo, Averell Daniell, William Glassford, Leon Wohlgemuth, Nick Kliskey, Frank Kutz, Arthur Detzel, Leslie Wilkins, Hubert Randour, Leon Shedlosky and Henry Weisenbaugh.

Scoring summary

Quarter	Time	Drive			Team	Scoring information	Score	
Quarter	Time	Plays	Yards	TOP	Team	Scoring information	Minnesota	Pittsburgh
2		1	64		Pittsburgh	Isadore Weinstock lateral to Mike Nicksick 64-yard touchdown run, Weinstock kick good	0	7
4		5	42		Minnesota	Julius Alfonse 22-yard touchdown run, Bill Bevan kick good	7	7
4		7	54		Minnesota	Bob Tenner 22-yard touchdown reception from Pug Lund, Bevan kick no good	13	7
"TOP" = time of possession. For other American football terms, see Glossary of American football.							13	7

=== At Westminster ===
Week 5: Pitt at Westminster

Team	1	2	3	4	Total
• Pitt	12	6	6	6	30
Westminster	0	0	6	0	6

- Date: October 27, 1934
- Location: Taggart Stadium
  New Castle, PA
- Game start: 2:30 p.m.
- Game attendance: 1,500
- Game weather: heavy rain
- Referee: Russell B. Goodwin (W. & J.)

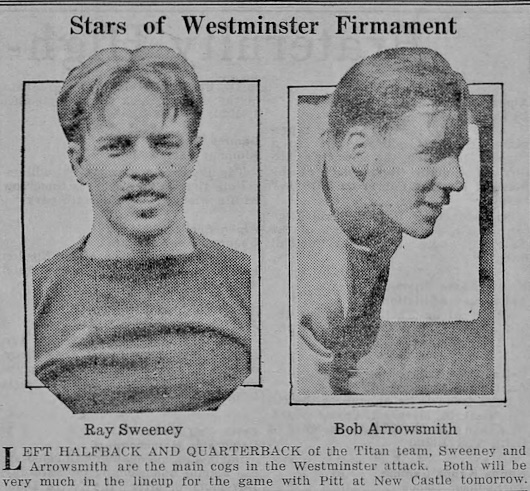
Westminster halfback Ray Sweeney and quarterback Bob Arrowsmith

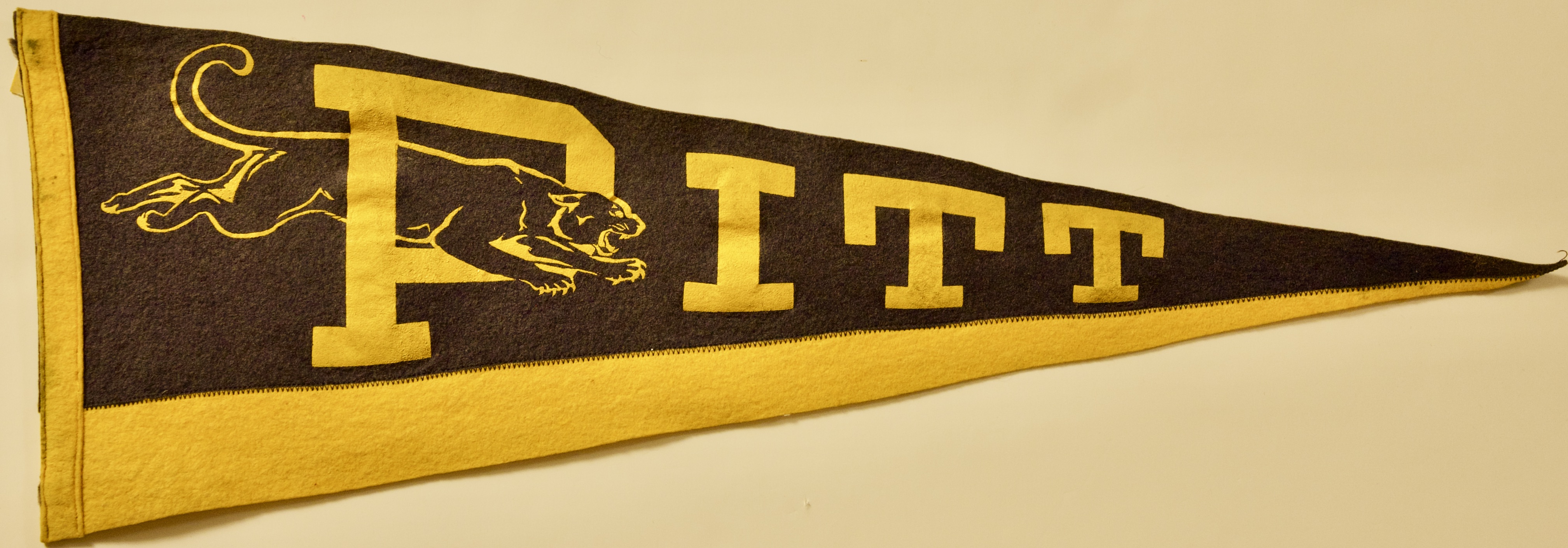
Pitt Panther souvenir pennant

On October 27, the Panthers bused about 60 miles north to New Castle, PA to play the Westminster Titans. The Titans led by twin brothers Bill and Tom Gilbane were 3–2 on the season. They beat Slippery Rock, Edinboro and Thiel, while losing to Fordham and John Carroll. The Gilbanes were grads of Brown University and were honorable mention All-Americans in 1932.

Coach Sutherland took the entire squad: "It's the one trip of the year we try to give all our players. I hope to use all of them against the Titans. I'll use as many as I dare, that is certain."

The New Castle News reported: "Playing under weather conditions that were more suitable for pneumonia or lumbago, than football, the University of Pittsburgh Panthers sloshed and slipped through mud and water at Taggart Stadium Saturday afternoon to take a 30 to 0 victory over a fighting Westminster College football team. About 1,500 hardy ardent field fans sat huddled in rain coats and blankets as the football men put on the show."

The Panthers managed five touchdowns, but missed all the extra points. Isadore Weinstock and Hubert Randour each scored two touchdowns and Mike Nicksick added one. The Panther offense earned eighteen first downs, while their defense surrendered only one first down to the Titans. Thirty-three Panthers participated in the one-sided romp. The officials shortened the quarters to 12 minutes due to the rain, sleet and cold. The Titans finished the season with a 3–5–1 record. This was the final time Pitt and Westminster would meet on the gridiron.

The Pitt starting lineup for the game against Westminster was Leslie Wilkins (left end), Averell Daniell (left tackle), William Glassford (left guard) Nick Kliskey (center), Frank Kutz (right guard), Arthur Detzel (right tackle), Vincent Sites (right end), Robert McClure (quarterback), Hubert Randour (left halfback), Leon Shedlosky (right halfback) and Isadore Weinstock (fullback). Substitutes appearing in the game for Pitt were Edward Quarantillo, Harvey Rooker, Regis Flynn, Verne Baxter, John Valenti, Robert Hoel, Stanley Olejniczak, Gene Stoughton, Leon Wohlgemuth, Marwood Stark, Charles Hartwig, George Shotwell, Charles Gongloff, Arnold Greene, Miller Munjas, Stanley O'Neil, Mike Nicksick, Leo Malarkey, Joseph Trogleone, Bobby LaRue, Arthur Ruff, Leonard Rector and Henry Weisenbaugh.

Scoring summary

Quarter	Time	Drive			Team	Scoring information	Score	
Quarter	Time	Plays	Yards	TOP	Team	Scoring information	Pittsburgh	Westminster
1		3	74		Pittsburgh	Isadore Weinstock 64-yard touchdown run, Weinstock kick no good	6	0
1		3	25		Pittsburgh	Weinstock 4-yard touchdown run, Weinstock kick no good	12	0
2		1	44		Pittsburgh	Hubert Randour 44-yard touchdown run, Arnold Greene kick no good	18	0
3		4	48		Pittsburgh	Randour 33-yard touchdown run, Greene kick no good	24	0
4		3	48		Pittsburgh	Mike Nicksick 32-yard touchdown run, Henry Weisenbaugh kick no good	30	0
"TOP" = time of possession. For other American football terms, see Glossary of American football.							30	0

=== Notre Dame ===
Week 6: Notre Dame at Pitt

Team	1	2	3	4	Total
Notre Dame	0	0	0	0	0
• Pitt	0	6	7	6	19

- Date: November 3, 1934
- Location: Pitt Stadium
  Pittsburgh, PA
- Game start: 2:00 p.m.
- Game attendance: 64,000
- Game weather: sunny and hot
- Referee: E. W. Carson (Penn State)

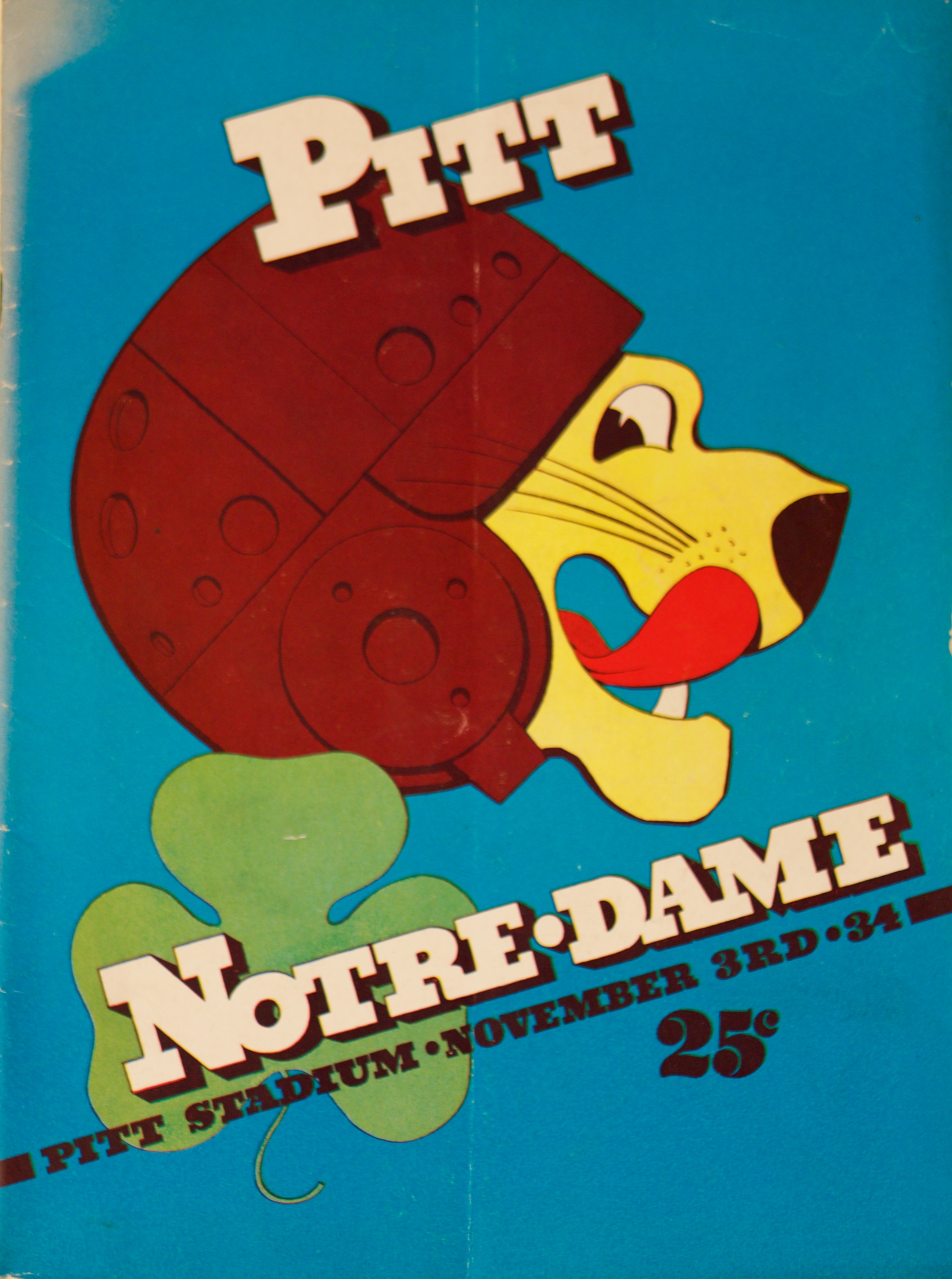
Program for the November 3 game versus Notre Dame

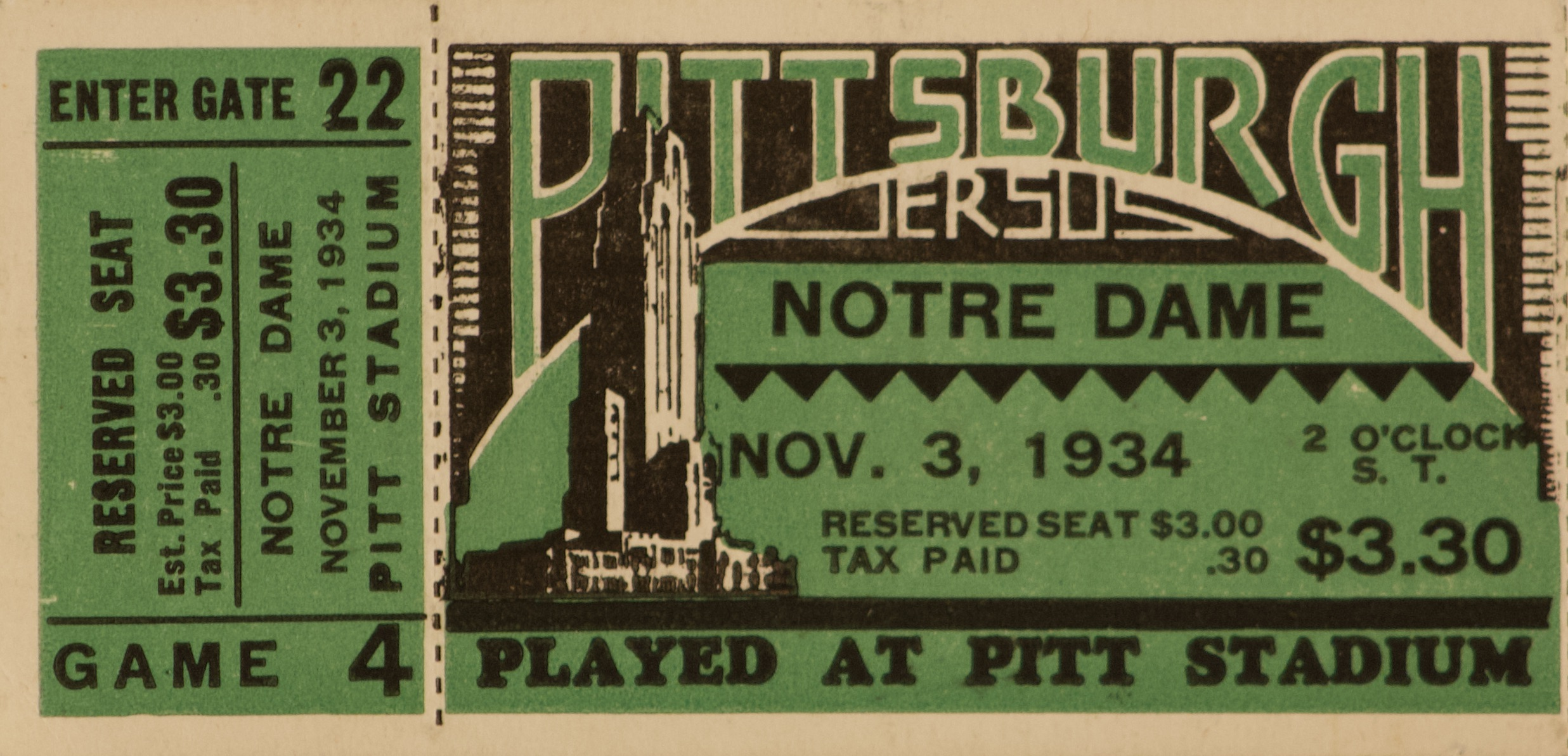
Ticket stub for November 3 game versus Notre Dame

On November 3, the Homecoming opponent for the Panthers was the "Fighting Irish" of Notre Dame. The Irish were led by first-year head coach Elmer Layden. His Irish arrived in Pittsburgh with a 3–1 record. They lost their home opener to Texas (7–6) and then won three straight against Purdue(18–7), Carnegie Tech (13–0) and Wisconsin(19–0). The Irish line was anchored by consensus All-American center Jack Robinson. Notre Dame led the all-time series 4–2–1, but Pitt had won the previous two games. Notre Dame brought 42 players for the game, and they were housed at the Pittsburgh Athletic Association. The South Bend Tribune reported: "Coach Layden indicated this morning that he would use his first string line for at least half the game, doing most of the substituting in the backfield. Every member of the squad is in good shape and spirit is running high." Earlier in the week Layden told a reporter: "Pittsburgh will beat us by at least two touchdowns. Jock Sutherland has too many experienced players for us."

Coach Sutherland started almost the same lineup that faced Minnesota. Starting right end Verne Baxter recovered from the flu and replaced Vincent Sites. French Lane of The Chicago Tribune wrote: "Coach Jock Sutherland of the Panthers, with tears ready to roll down his wrinkled cheeks, said: 'We will be satisfied to win by 2 to 0, but I'm wondering how we can score a safety'."

Under ideal weather conditions, the Pittsburgh Panthers became the second team to defeat Notre Dame three years in a row as they shut out the Irish 19 to 0 in front of 64,000 fans. Most of the first quarter was a punting contest. The Panther offense advanced the ball on one possession to the Notre Dame 5-yard line, but lost the ball on downs. At the beginning of the second period, Layden substituted a new backfield and Sutherland replaced the entire Pitt lineup except left end Harvey Rooker. The Pitt defense forced a punt. Irish halfback Andy Pilney punted to Leon Shedloskey on the Pitt 42-yard line. With blockers in front, he sprinted 58 yards for the touchdown. Isadore Weinstock missed the point after and Pitt led 6 to 0. Late in the half, Notre Dame recovered a Weinstock fumble on the Pitt 44-yard line. Pitt third-string quarterback Arnold Greene intercepted a pass and carried the ball to the end zone. The officials ruled he had stepped out of bounds on the 2-yard line. Time ran out before the next play and Pitt led 6 to 0 at halftime. In mid-third quarter, the Panthers gained possession on their 35-yard line. Five running plays advanced the ball to the Irish 46-yard line. From there, Mike Nicksick "slashed through left tackle, reversed his field, and ran forty-six yards for a touchdown as Pitt blockers scattered the Irish players like so many tenpins. Weinstock placekicked the extra point." Score: Pitt 13; Notre Dame 0. In the last quarter, the Irish offense penetrated to the Pitt 33-yard line. On third down Henry Weisenbaugh intercepted an errant pass and returned the ball to the Notre Dame 32-yard line. On first down, after a gain of 29 yards, Shedlosky was forced out of bounds on the Irish 3-yard line. On the next play, Nicksick scored the final touchdown. Weisenbaugh was wide on the placement. Final score: Pitt 19; Notre Dame 0. Notre Dame finished the season with a 6–3 record.

The Pitt offense made 9 first downs and netted 232 yards from scrimmage. The Panther defense intercepted 6 passes and held the Irish to 5 first downs and 97 yards total offense.

Les Biederman of The Press spoke with a smiling Coach Sutherland: "I think it was a darn hard-fought game. Notre Dame has a good team but Pitt looked awful good to me today."

The Pitt starting lineup for the game against Notre Dame was Harvey Rooker (left end), Robert Hoel (left tackle), Charles Hartwig (left guard), George Shotwell (center), Ken Ormiston (right guard), Stanley Olejniczak (right tackle), Verne Baxter (right end), Miller Munjas (quarterback), Mike Nicksack (left halfback), Bobby LaRue (right halfback) and Isadore Weinstock (fullback). Substitutes appearing in the game for Pitt were Edward Quarantillo, Averell Daniell, Frank Kutz, Marwood Stark, William Glassford, Nick Kliskey, Arthur Detzel, Vincent Sites, Robert McClure, Arnold Greene, Leon Shedlosky, Hubert Randour, Joseph Trogleone, Stanley O'Neil, Henry Weisenbaugh and Leonard Rector.

Scoring summary

Quarter	Time	Drive			Team	Scoring information	Score	
Quarter	Time	Plays	Yards	TOP	Team	Scoring information	Notre Dame	Pittsburgh
2		1	58		Pittsburgh	Punt returned 58 yards for touchdown by Leon Shedlosky, Isadore Weinstock kick no good	0	6
3		6	65		Pittsburgh	Mike Nicksick 46-yard touchdown run, Weinstock kick good	0	13
4		2	32		Pittsburgh	Nicksick 3-yard touchdown run, Henry Weisenbaugh kick no good	0	19
"TOP" = time of possession. For other American football terms, see Glossary of American football.							0	19

=== At Nebraska ===
Week 7: Pitt at Nebraska

Team	1	2	3	4	Total
• Pitt	6	6	13	0	25
Nebraska	0	0	0	6	6

- Date: November 10, 1934
- Location: Memorial Stadium
  Lincoln, NE
- Game start: 2:00 p.m.
- Game attendance: 35,000
- Referee: Leslie Edmonds (Ottawa)

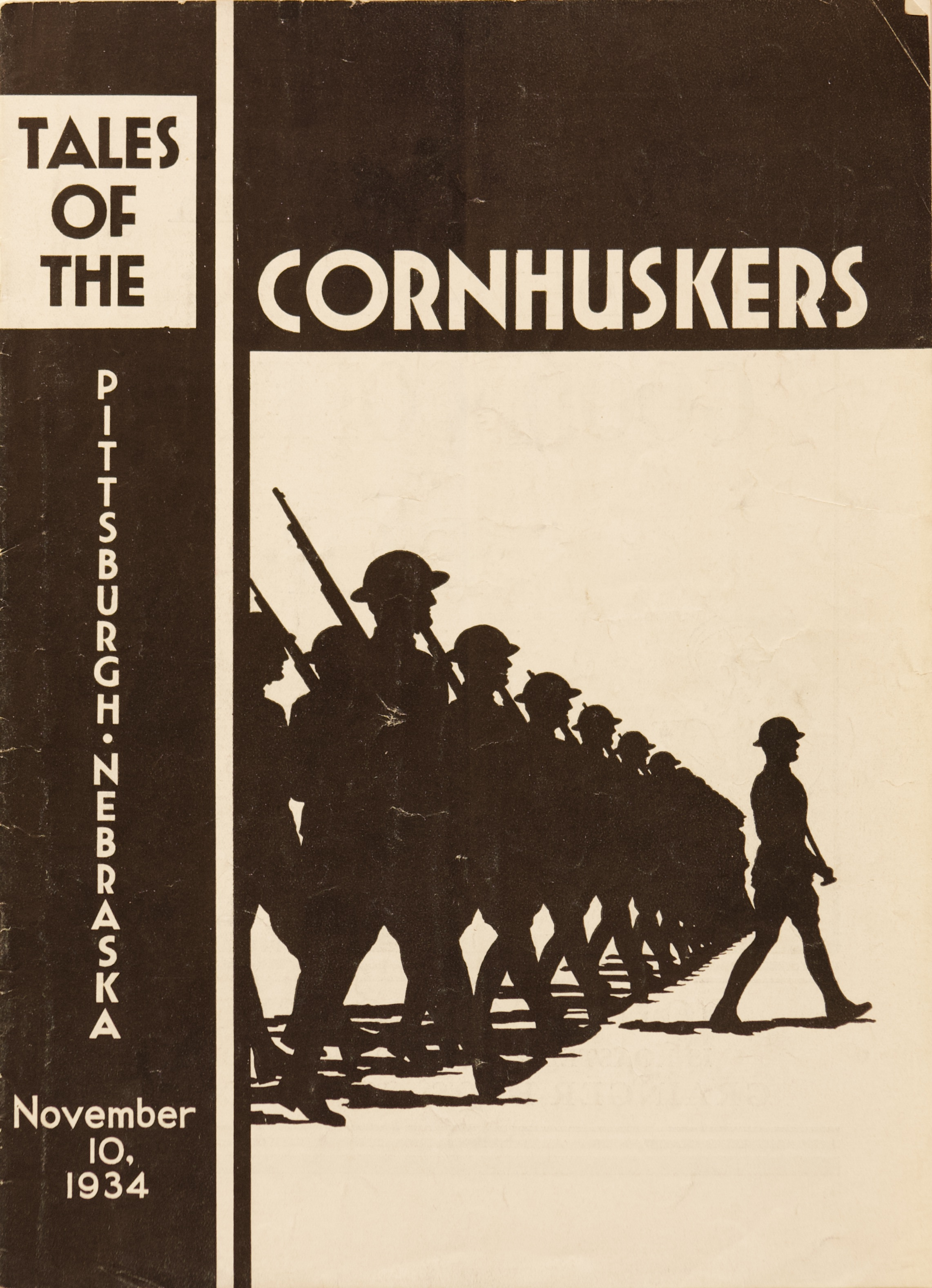
Program for the November 10 game versus Nebraska

Pitt's third road trip was to Lincoln, NE for their annual game against the Nebraska Cornhuskers. The Panthers lost the first meeting in 1921, but since the series was renewed in 1927, the Panthers had not lost to the Huskers and the series stood at 4–1–3 in Pitt's favor. On the train ride west, the Panther squad had a stopover Thursday morning in Chicago. Coach Sutherland held an afternoon workout on the University of Chicago's Stagg Memorial Stadium. After dinner the team reboarded the train, and departed for Omaha. The next morning they arrived in Omaha, and quartered at the Hotel Fontenelle. The afternoon workout was held in secret at the Ak-Sar-Ben fair pavilion.

Sutherland was his usual pessimistic self when asked if the game would end in another 0–0 tie: "Maybe-maybe. We've had better teams here and couldn't win. No, I don't expect it'll be a tie. D. X. has a good team. Nebraska will probably beat us this time."

Coach Sutherland wanted more quickness in the backfield, so he started Henry Weisenbaugh at fullback in place of Isadore Weinstock. The rest of the starting lineup was intact and healthy.

Sixth-year coach Dana X. Bible's Huskers were 4–1 on the season. Their only blemish was a 20–0 loss to Pitt's nemesis, the Minnesota Gophers. Since Nebraska was idle the week prior to the Pitt game, Coach Bible showed the team two movies to get them psyched for the Pitt game: "Nebraska's 0–0 Tie With Pitt in 1932" was followed by "Pitt's 6–0 Victory, Or Why Nebraska Didn't Go To the Rose Bowl in 1933."

The student body was in a frenzied state over this game. They circulated a pledge of loyalty that was signed by 2,500-3,000 students. The pledge read: "The student body of the University of Nebraska tenders this to you as a pledge of our consistent loyalty. You are facing the season's most crucial battle. More than any of the other games, we are anxious for a decisive victory over Pittsburgh in the traditional conflict. But if you fight cleanly, whether you win or lose-the student body will be proud of it's [sic] football team and loyal to it! We are with you 100 per cent. Our signatures attest to our support. Go Out and Win!" The pledge was presented to team captain Frank Meier on Thursday.

Armistice Day was celebrated prior to the game. After the University cadet regiment passed in review, the student band entertained, the Pershing Rifles fired a salute and the buglers played taps.

In front of a record crowd the Pitt Panther offense led by halfback Mike Nicksick's four touchdown performance, defeated the Nebraska Cornhuskers 25 to 6. Pitt received the opening kick-off and advanced the ball to the Husker 14-yard line. On fourth down Nicksick fumbled and Nebraska recovered. After an exchange of punts, Pitt had possession on their own 49-yard line. Henry Weisenbaugh gained 8 yards, but was hurt on the play. He was replaced by Isadore Weinstock. Two rushes and an offside penalty against Nebraska moved the ball to the 25-yard line. Weinstock promptly ran off tackle for 20 yards and a first down on the 5-yard line. Nicksick scored from the 1-yard line on fourth down. Weinstock missed the placement. Pitt 6 to Nebraska 0. In the second quarter, the Panthers sustained a 9-play 58-yard drive. Nicksick ran the last 11 yards for the score. The extra point was blocked and Pitt led at halftime 12 to 0. The Panthers scored on the opening drive of the third quarter. Weinstock returned the kick-off to his 24-yard line. On first down, Nicksick carried the ball to the Husker 46-yard line. On the next play, Weinstock broke into the secondary and gained 8 yards. As he was about to be tackled, he lateraled to the trailing Nicksick who ran the remaining distance unmolested for the score. Weinstock missed the placement and Pitt led 18 to 0. Later in the third stanza, Weinstock and Nicksick repeated the lateral play and gained 46 yards to the Husker 15-yard line. Two plays later Nicksick scored his fourth touchdown. Ken Ormiston was successful on the placement and Pitt led 25 to 0 after three periods. Nebraska scored against the Pitt second and third stringers late in the game. Husker quarterback Henry “Chief” Bauer hit end Ray Toman with three straight passes for the score. Nebraska was offside on the try for point, so the final score read: Pitt 25; Nebraska 6.

Pitt was the first team to beat Nebraska in Memorial Stadium twice. Ray Toman's touchdown was the first score against Pitt by the Huskers since 1929. The nineteen point margin of defeat was the most administered to the Huskers since the 1916 Notre Dame 20–0 loss. Nebraska finished the season with a 6–3 record.

The Pitt starting lineup for the game against Nebraska was Harvey Rooker (left end), Robert Hoel (left tackle), Charles Hartwig (left guard), George Shotwell (center), Ken Ormiston (right guard), Stanley Olejniczak (right tackle), Verne Baxter (right end), Miller Munjas (quarterback), Mike Nicksick (left halfback), Bobby LaRue (right halfback) and Henry Weisenbaugh (fullback). Substitutes appearing in the game for Pitt were Edward Quarantillo, Averell Daniell, William Glassford, Leon Wohlgemuth, Nick Kliskey, Charles Gongloff, Frank Kutz, Marwood Stark, Arthur Detzel, John Valenti, Vincent Sites, Leslie Wilkins, Arnold Greene, Robert McClure, Hubert Randour, Stanley O'Neil, Leon Shedlosky, Leo Malarkey, Isadore Weinstock and Leonard Rector.

Scoring summary

Quarter	Time	Drive			Team	Scoring information	Score	
Quarter	Time	Plays	Yards	TOP	Team	Scoring information	Pittsburgh	Nebraska
1		8	51		Pittsburgh	Mike Nicksick 1-yard touchdown run, Isadore Weinstock kick no good	6	0
2		9	58		Pittsburgh	Nicksick 11-yard touchdown run, Weinstock kick blocked	12	0
3		2	76		Pittsburgh	Nicksick lateral from Weinstock combined 46-yard touchdown run, Weinstock kick no good	18	0
3		3	61		Pittsburgh	Nicksick 2-yard touchdown run, Ken Ormiston kick good	25	0
4		4	54		Nebraska	Ray Toman 16-yard touchdown reception from Henry “Chief” Bauer, Toman kick no good (Nebraska offsides)	25	6
"TOP" = time of possession. For other American football terms, see Glossary of American football.							25	6

=== At Navy ===
Week 8: Pitt at Navy

Team	1	2	3	4	Total
• Pitt	12	0	6	13	31
Navy	0	7	0	0	7

- Date: November 17, 1934
- Location: Thompson Stadium
  Annapolis, MD
- Game start: 2:00 p.m.
- Game attendance: 25,000
- Game weather: perfect
- Referee: F. A. Geiges (Temple)

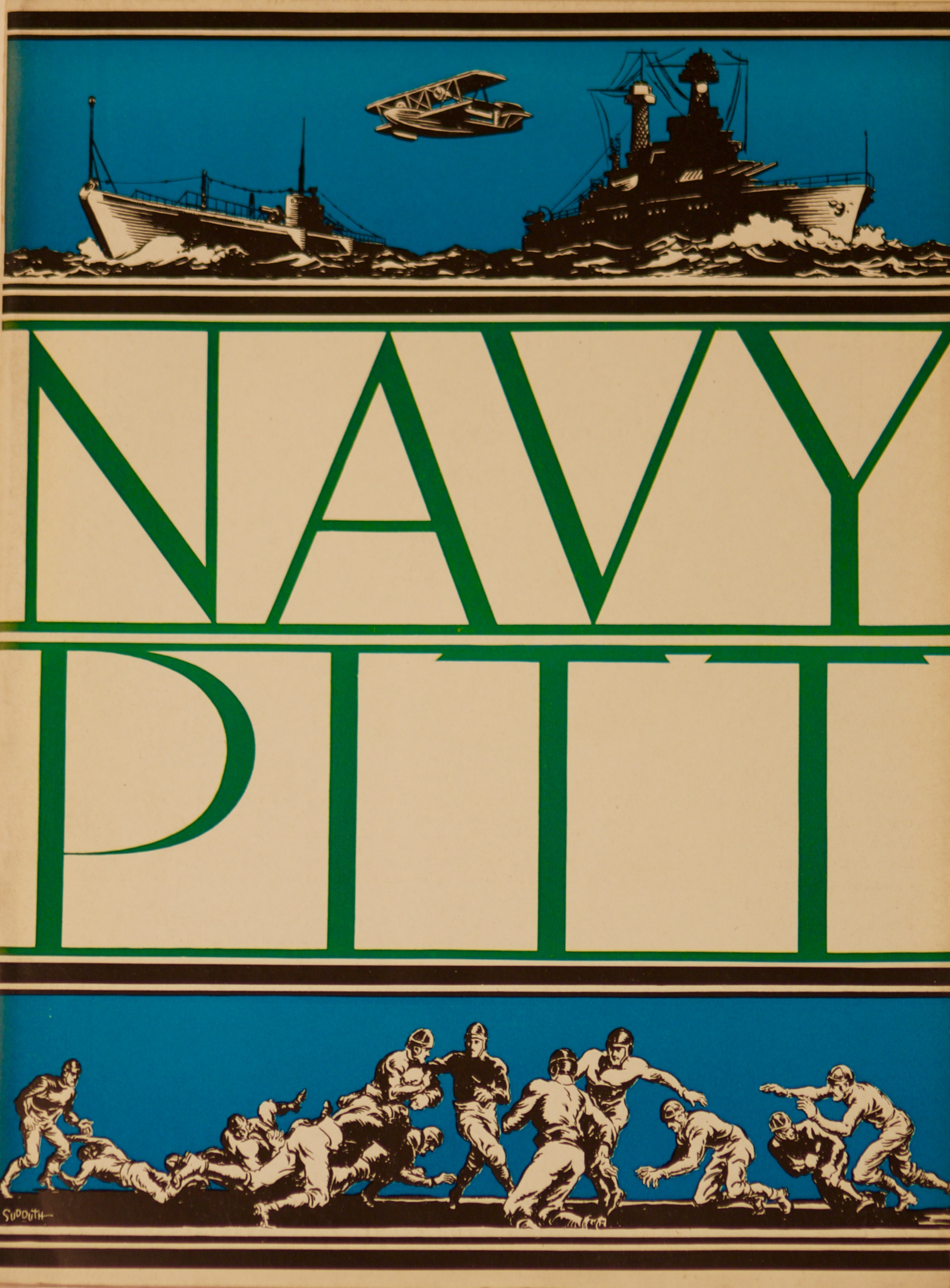
Program for November 17 game versus Navy

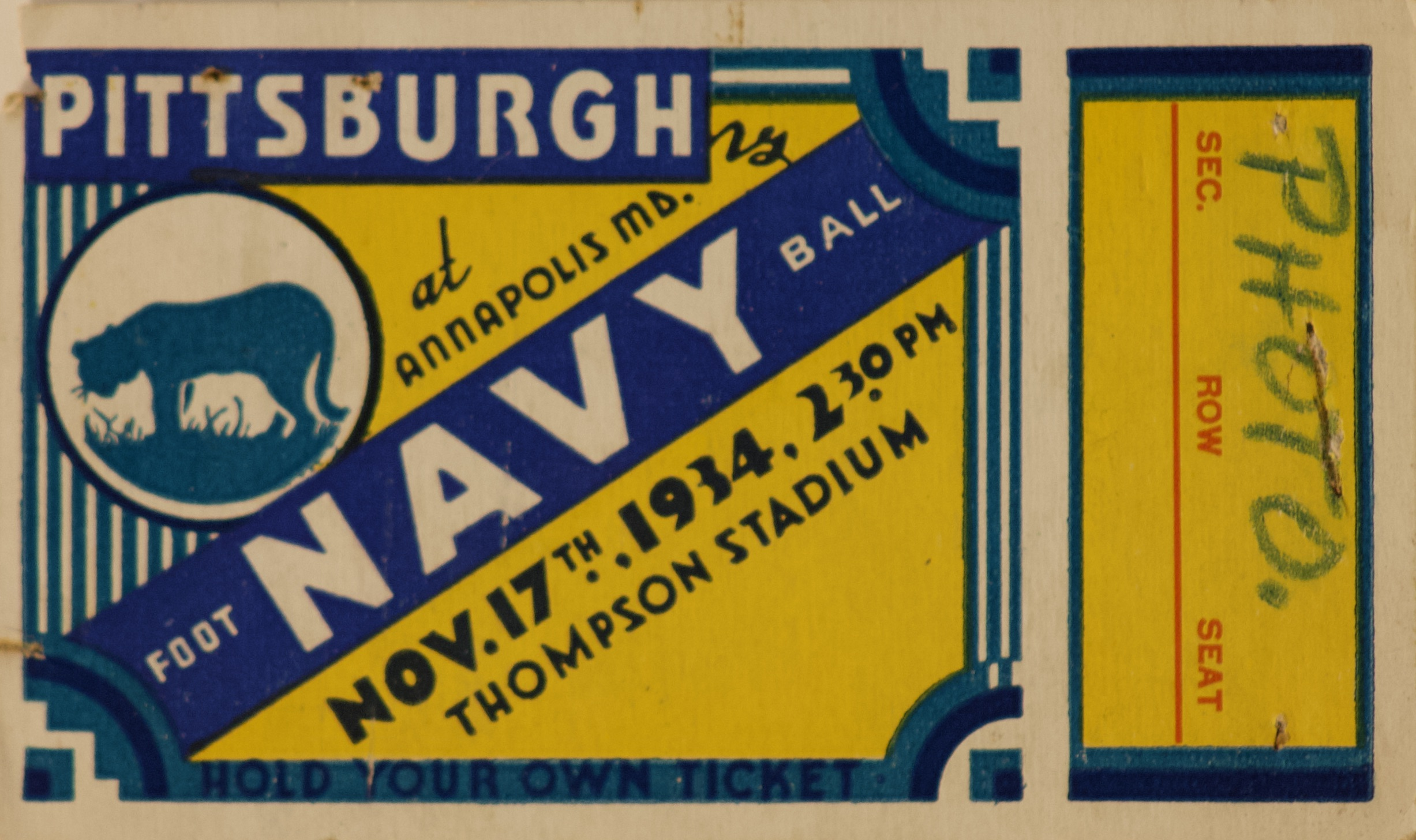
Ticket for November 17 game versus Navy

The final road trip was east to Annapolis, MD to take on the Navy Midshipmen in Thompson Stadium. Navy was led by first-year coach Tom Hamilton. He played halfback on the 1924-1926 Navy teams and was named All-American in 1926. His Middies were 7–0 on the season and hopeful of gaining some revenge for the 34 to 6 defeat to the Panthers in 1933. The Navy eleven beat Notre Dame the previous week (10–6) and earlier administered the only defeat to the Lou Little-coached Columbia Lions (18–7). Navy was led on the field by two All-Americans - halfback Fred "Buzz" Borries and tackle Slade Cutter. Coach Hamilton told the Post-Gazette: "Pittsburgh has one of the best teams in the nation. But we have a good team, too. We'll go into this game just as we did into the others – to win."

On Thursday night, the Panther contingent rode the Baltimore & Ohio train to Washington D. C. where they headquartered at the Wardman Park Hotel. On Friday a workout was held on the Georgetown University practice field. Coach Sutherland replaced injured end Verne Baxter with Vincent Sites and inserted Isadore Weinstock back at fullback in the starting lineup. Despite only one game being played in Pittsburgh, the Panthers led the series 4–1–1.

In front of a packed Thompson Stadium crowd of 25,000 plus, Pitt dominated the Midshipmen and won the game 31 to 7. Craig E. Taylor of The Baltimore Sun wrote:"So came to an end the Navy dream of gridiron immortality, its string of seven straight victories smashed by an opponent beyond its class...it was David and Goliath, and David had no sling."

Pitt took the opening kick-off and drove 80 yards in 17 plays with Isadore Weinstock carrying the ball the final yard for the touchdown. Weinstock's placement kick was wide. A short while later, the Panthers mounted a 61-yard 9 play drive capped by a 12-yard scamper by Bobby LaRue for the second Panther score. Ken Ormiston”s placement attempt failed and Pitt led 12 to 0 at the end of the first quarter. In the second period, Navy conducted an 11-play 81-yard drive for their only points of the game. With the ball on the Pitt 8-yard line, Navy back Holman Lee lateraled to Fred "Buzz" Borries and he passed to Thomas King for the touchdown. Slade Cutter converted the point after to make the halftime score 12 to 7 in favor of Pitt. In the third stanza, Weinstock added 6 more points with his second touchdown. The Panther subs played the fourth quarter and sustained drives of 80 and 65 yards, resulting in touchdowns by Hubert Randour and Leon Shedlosky. Henry Weisenbaugh converted a placement after the final touchdown to make the final tally: Pitt 31; Navy 7.

Coach Hamilton was gracious in defeat: "Pitt was a great team today. I really thought before the game that we had a chance to beat them. I still thought so between halves when the score was only 12–7 against us. But they changed my mind shortly after that. We weren't disgraced, for that was a powerful Pitt eleven."

The Pitt starting lineup for the game against Navy was Harvey Rooker (left end), Robert Hoel (left tackle), Charles Hartwig (left guard), George Shotwell (center), Ken Ormiston (right guard), Stanley Olejniczak (right tackle), Vincent Sites (right end), Miller Munjas (quarterback), Mike Nicksick (left halfback), Bobby LaRue (right halfback) and Isadore Weinstock (fullback). Substitutes appearing in the game for Pitt were Edward Quarantillo, Louis Wojchovski, Averell Daniell, Gene Stoughton, Frank Kutz, Leon Wohlgemuth, Nick Kliskey, Charles Gongloff, William Glassford, Marwood Stark, Karl Seiffert, Leslie Wilkins, Arnold Greene, Robert McClure, Hubert Randour, Leo Malarkey, Leon Shedlosky, Stanley O'Neil, Henry Weisenbaugh and Leo Rector.

Scoring summary

Quarter	Time	Drive			Team	Scoring information	Score	
Quarter	Time	Plays	Yards	TOP	Team	Scoring information	Pittsburgh	Navy
1		17	80		Pittsburgh	Isadore Weinstock 1-yard touchdown run, Weinstock kick no good	6	0
1		9	61		Pittsburgh	Bobby LaRue 12-yard touchdown run, Ken Ormiston kick no good	12	0
2		11	81		Navy	Thomas King 8-yard touchdown reception from Fred “Buzz” Borries, Slade Cutter kick good	12	7
3		7	55		Pittsburgh	Weinstock 16-yard touchdown run, Weinstock kick no good	18	7
4		8	80		Pittsburgh	Hubert Randour 15-yard touchdown run, Arnold Greene kick no good	24	7
4		14	65		Pittsburgh	Leon Shedlosky 5-yard touchdown run, Henry Weisenbaugh kick good	31	7
"TOP" = time of possession. For other American football terms, see Glossary of American football.							31	7

=== Carnegie Tech ===
Week 9: Carnegie Tech at Pitt

Team	1	2	3	4	Total
Carnegie tech	0	0	0	0	0
• Pitt	7	0	7	6	20

- Date: November 29, 1934
- Location: Pitt Stadium
  Pittsburgh, PA
- Game start: 2:00 p.m.
- Game attendance: 35,000
- Game weather: cloudy
- Referee: W. C. Crowell (Swarthmore)

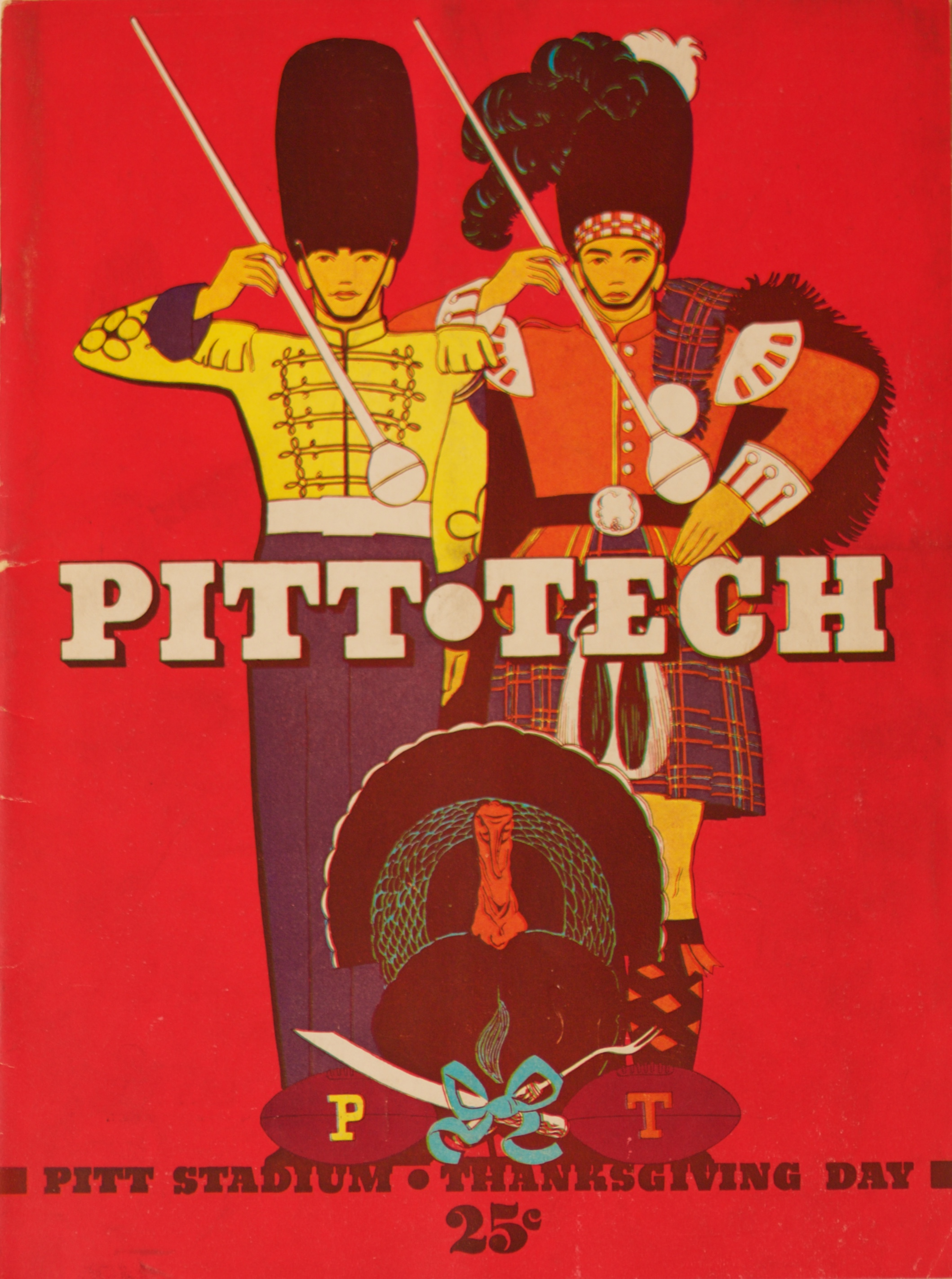
Program for November 29 game versus Carnegie Tech

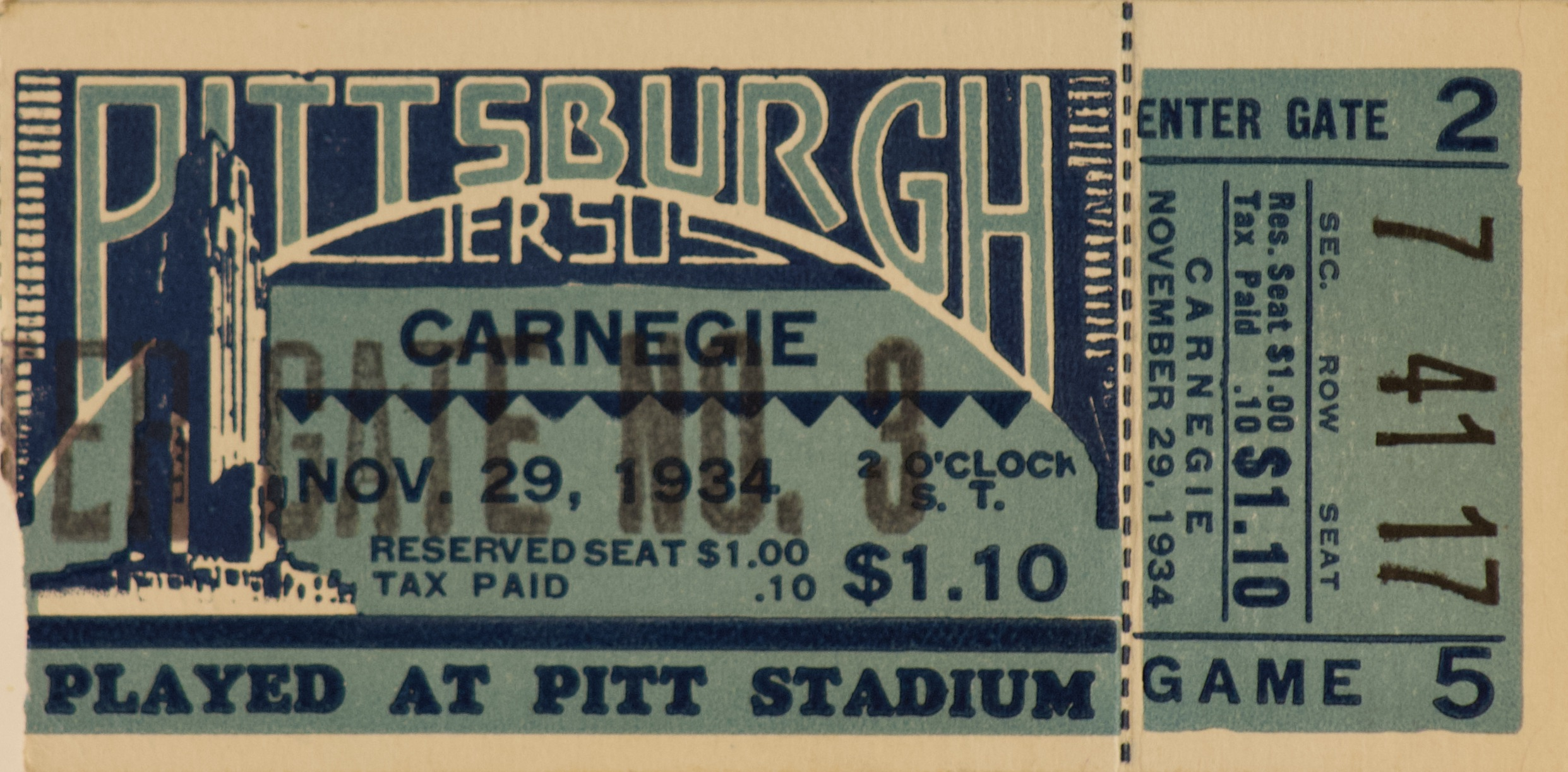
Ticket stub for November 29 game versus Carnegie Tech

On Thanksgiving Day, the Panthers hoped to capture their sixth straight "City Title" against the Tartans of Carnegie Tech. Pitt led the series 16–4 and had not lost to the Tartans since 1928.

Second-year coach Howard Harpster's Tartans were 4–4. They beat Geneva, Miami (Ohio), NYU and upset city-rival Duquesne. They lost to Michigan State, Notre Dame, Purdue and Pop Warner's Temple Owls. Coach Harpster felt his team was in the best shape of the season after the ten day rest following the Duquesne game. He wrote: "It has been quite a few years since Carnegie has defeated Pitt and our chances tomorrow are not what might be termed overly bright. However, our players are going into the game with an 'I'm from Missouri' attitude, and the Pitts will have to prove first hand that they are as great as every one says they are."

Coach Sutherland was sad that fourteen seniors were playing in their final game as Panthers. The Panther faithful would bid farewell to Captain Doc Hartwig, Ken Ormiston, Frank Kutz, George Shotwell, Bob Hoel, Stan Olejniczak, Harvey Rooker, Karl Seiffert, Les Wilkins, Louis Wojcihovski, Miller Munjas, Mike Nicksick, Isadore Weinstock and Henry Weisenbaugh. Sutherland wrote in The Pittsburgh Press: "No matter what the score is at the end of tomorrow's game, I will not be one of the happiest men in Pittsburgh. I will be saying goodbye and good luck to entirely too many fine boys with whom it has been my privileges [sic] to work for the past four years."

The local newspapers pointed out that the Panthers started the season wearing white jerseys and golden trousers for their games. For the Minnesota game, Sutherland had the team attired in blue jerseys. After losing to the Gophers, white jerseys were the uniform of the Panthers. Carnegie Tech chose to wear white for this game and Pitt bowed to the wishes of the visitors.

The Panthers won their sixth straight "City Title" by shutting out the Tartans 20 to 0. They also earned first possession of a "Victory Bell" trophy, which was presented by a downtown store.

On Tech's second possession, halfback Willie Spisak fumbled and Pitt halfback Mike Nicksick recovered on the Tartans' 23-yard line. The Panther offense ran 10 plays through the tough Tech defense to earn the touchdown. Isadore Weinstock plunged over from the 1-yard line for the score. He was good on the placement and Pitt led 7 to 0 at halftime. In the third quarter the Panthers capitalized on another Tech fumble for their second touchdown. Tartan back Steve Terebus fumbled on his 20-yard line. There was a mad scramble for the ball and Pitt captain Charles Hartwig recovered it on the 3-yard line. On second down, Weinstock vaulted into the end zone for his second tally of the day. He was good on the placement and Pitt led at the end of three periods 14 to 0. In the fourth period, Hubert Randour scampered 12 yards around right end to cap a 4-play, 48-yard drive. Henry Weisenbaugh missed the extra point and the final score read Pitt 20 to Tech 0.

The Pitt starting lineup for the game against Carnegie Tech was Harvey Rooker (left end), Robert Hoel (left tackle), Charles Hartwig (left guard), George Shotwell (center), Ken Ormiston (right guard), Stanley Olejniczak (right tackle), Verne Baxter (right end), Miller Munjas (quarterback), Mike Nicksick (left halfback), Bobby LaRue (right halfback) and Isadore Weinstock (fullback). Substitutes appearing in the game for Pitt were Edward Quarantillo, Averell Daniell, William Glassford, Leon Wohlgemuth, Nick Kliskey, Frank Kutz, Marwood Stark, Arthur Detzel, Vincent Sites, Francis Seiffert, Arnold Greene, Hubert Randour, Leon Shedlosky, Henry Weisenbaugh and Leo Rector.

Scoring summary

Quarter	Time	Drive			Team	Scoring information	Score	
Quarter	Time	Plays	Yards	TOP	Team	Scoring information	Carnegie Tech	Pittsburgh
1		10	23		Pittsburgh	Isadore Weinstock 1-yard touchdown run, Weinstock kick good	0	7
3		2	3		Pittsburgh	Weinstock 1-yard touchdown run, Weinstock kick good	0	14
4		4	48		Pittsburgh	Hubert Randour 12-yard touchdown run, Henry Weisenbaugh kick no good	0	20
"TOP" = time of possession. For other American football terms, see Glossary of American football.							0	20

== Individual scoring summary ==
1934 Pittsburgh Panthers scoring summary
Player	Touchdowns	Extra points	Field goals	Safety	Points
Isadore Weinstock	9	9	0	0	63
Michael Nicksick	8	0	0	0	48
Leon Shedlosky	4	0	0	0	24
Hub Randour	4	0	0	0	24
Henry Weisenbaugh	3	3	0	0	21
Verne Baxter	2	0	0	0	12
Harvey Rooker	1	0	0	0	6
Robert LaRue	1	0	0	0	6
Ken Ormiston	0	1	0	0	1
Totals	32	13	0	0	205

== Postseason ==
The Panthers were hoping for an invitation to the Rose Bowl, but undefeated Alabama received the honor. The Panthers were under consideration for the Sugar Bowl in New Orleans and an “Eastern Championship” game in New York City against Colgate, but the University Athletic Council voted not to extend the season.

Isadore Weinstock was selected the most valuable player of the year in district football by the Curbstone Coaches' Association.

Charles Hartwig, Isadore Weinstock and Miller Munjas were selected by East co-coach Andy Kerr of Colgate to play in the East-West Shrine game on New Year's Day in San Francisco.

The Athletic Department awarded football letters to: Charles Hartwig, Harvey Rooker, Robert Hoel, George Shotwell, Ken Ormiston, Stanley Olejniczak, Verne Baxter, Miller Munjas, Mike Nicksick, Robert LaRue, Isadore Weinstock, Edward Quarantillo, Averell Daniell, William Glassford, Nick Kliskey, Frank Kutz, Arthur Detzel, Vincent Sites, Arnold Greene, Hubert Randour, Leon Shedlosky, Henry Weisenbaugh, Karl Seiffert, Robert McClure and Arthur Ruff. Student managers Jess Pennington and Clifford McClain were also awarded a letter.

At the annual football banquet Stewart McAwley and Joseph Rodgers were named co-managers of the varsity football squad for the 1935 season. They were both juniors in the School of Business Administration. It was decided that a captain would be appointed on a game to game basis.

Freshmen football coach Dr. Roscoe Gougler was not retained by the athletic department. Walter Milligan, who had been serving as varsity line coach, was given the job. Dr. Gougler remained on the Dental School staff. Charles Bowser was rehired as an assistant backfield coach. Bowser played for Pop Warner from 1920-1922 and later worked as an assistant for Jock Sutherland from 1927-1929. He had been the head coach at Bowdoin University for the past 5 years.

== All-Americans ==
- **Charles Hartwig**, guard, Pitt's team captain. The following season his picture was put on a Wheaties cereal box for being a football hero. He battled back from an injury that caused him to miss his entire sophomore year. A media guide referred to him as a brilliant defensive player and workmanlike on offense. He was a Panther standout in the 1933 Rose Bowl. Played the 1935 East–West Shrine Game.
- **George Shotwell**, center became an All-American for his offensive line play in 1934. He was highly regarded for his all-around skills. Shotwell was an intelligent football player known as a keen diagnostician of plays. "I have never seen his superior in this respect, and only a coach knows how valuable this quality is," Coach Jock Sutherland said.
- Isadore Weinstock, fullback, a smart and aggressive fullback who became an All-American in 1934. He was known as a crack ball-handler, especially on trick plays such as double passes and fake reverses. Weinstock was a fine blocker and also played defensive back, kicked extra points and handled kickoff duties. After suffering a broken nose he became one of the first players to wear a face mask. He led the Panthers in scoring in 1934 with 63 points. After Pitt he went on to the NFL, where he played three seasons at quarterback for Philadelphia and Pittsburgh.
- Ken Ormiston, guard, gained first team honors on the New York Sun and International News Service teams.
- Miller Munjas, quarterback, gained first team honors on the New York World Telegraph team. He was also mentioned on the North American Newspaper Alliance second team and the Associated Press third team.

*Bold - Consensus All-American

== List of national championship selectors ==
A "list of college football's mythical champions as selected by every recognized authority [sic] since 1924," printed in Sports Illustrated in 1967, revealed that Parke Davis' selection of Pitt after he was dead was the historical basis of the university's 1934 national championship claim, a selection that is not documented in the official NCAA football records book. After the death of Davis in June, 1934, Walter R. Okeson became the editor of the annual Spalding's Official Foot Ball Guide, which Davis had previously edited. In the Guide, Davis had compiled a list titled, "Outstanding Nationwide and Sectional Teams," for the seasons from 1869 onward. For several years, Okeson continued to add annual selections to this list, described as "Originally Compiled by the late Parke H. Davis." The 1935 Guide stated, in Okeson's review of the 1934 season, "Minnesota — Undefeated and untied, team was generally conceded to be national leader," and "Pittsburgh — Defeated only by Minnesota, team was generally rated as strongest in East." Okeson listed both schools as "Outstanding Nationwide Teams" for 1934.

These are the selectors that determined Pitt to be national champion in 1934, as recognized by College Football Data Warehouse: none

However, there are 39 selectors who chose Alabama and Minnesota (who defeated Pitt in Pittsburgh) as national champions for 1934, including 13 "major" selectors (i.e., those that were "national in scope").
