= Les Biederman =

American sports writer and columnist

Lester John Biederman (June 7, 1907 – November 30, 1981) was an American sports writer and columnist, writing exclusively for The Pittsburgh Press, from 1930 until his retirement in 1969.

== Career ==
From 1938, Biederman covered the Pittsburgh Pirates, becoming the Press' sports editor in 1966; excluding his military service in World War II, he served in both capacities until his retirement in 1969. For the final 20 of those years, Biederman was also a correspondent for The Sporting News.

In 1953, Biederman was elected to the Board of Directors of the Baseball Writers' Association of America; in 1959, he served as its president. That same year, Biederman was named Pennsylvania Sportswriter of the Year by the National Sportscasters and Sportswriters Association. In 1956, he initiated the Scoreboard Fund, under the umbrella of the Press Old Newsboys; over the next 14 years, under Biederman's direction, the fund raised approximately half a million dollars for the Children's Hospital of Pittsburgh.

In a 2015 New York Times article, historian Michael Beschloss criticized Biederman for mockingly portraying, in exaggerated "Spanglish", the speech of Roberto Clemente.
