= Vincent Sites =

American football player (1912–1983)

No. 25, 67
- Position: End

Personal information
- Born: July 9, 1912; Pittston, Pennsylvania, U.S.
- Died: September 12, 1983 (aged 71); San Diego, California,U.S.
- Listed height: 6 ft 2 in (1.88 m)
- Listed weight: 215 lb (98 kg)

Career information
- High school: St. John's (Pittston)
- College: Pittsburgh (1932–1935)
- NFL draft: 1936: undrafted

Career history
- Pittsburgh Pirates (1936–1937); Cincinnati Bengals (1937)
- Stats at Pro Football Reference

Vincent Joseph Sites (July 9, 1912 – September 12, 1983) was an American professional football end who played for the Pittsburgh Pirates of the National Football League (NFL). He played college football for the Pittsburgh Panthers.

== Early life ==
Vincent Joseph Sites was born on July 9, 1912, in Pittston, Pennsylvania. He graduated from St. John's High School in Pittston.

== College career ==
In 1930, Sites enrolled at Temple University to play college football for the Owls. However, he never played for the Owls and in November 1930, he enrolled at Wyoming Seminary in Kingston, Pennsylvania, for a postgraduate year. He played football and basketball at Wyoming Seminary from 1930 to 1931, and was captain of the basketball team in 1931.

In 1932, Sites enrolled at the University of Pittsburgh to play football for the Panthers as an end. He was on the freshman team during the 1932 season. He was on the varsity team in 1933 but did not earn a letter. Sites was a two-year varsity letterman from 1934 to 1935.

== Professional career ==
After going undrafted in the 1936 NFL draft, Sites signed with the Pittsburgh Pirates in May 1936. He played in all 12 games, starting seven, for the Pirates during the 1936 season, catching two passes for 22 yards. He appeared in the first seven games of the 1937 season, starting one, while catching two passes for ten yards. Sites was released on October 26, 1937.

On October 30, 1937, it was reported that Sites had signed with the Cincinnati Bengals of the American Football League. He played in four games, all starts, for the Bengals in 1937.

== Personal life ==
Sites served in the United States Navy during World War II as a full lieutenant, and saw action in the South West Pacific theatre. On September 12, 1983, he died suddenly at Cabrillo Sharp Hospital in San Diego after being "stricken" at home.
