= Ozark Conference =

- Association: MSHSAA
- Founded: 1960
- Sports fielded: 19; men's: 10; women's: 9
- No. of teams: 11
- Region: Missouri Ozarks

The Ozark Conference was a high school athletic conference represented by 11 schools in the southwest portion of Missouri. As the name implies, all eleven schools are in the Ozarks region of the state and all are among the biggest in the region. The conference offers championships for girls in Basketball, Cross Country, Golf, Soccer, Softball, Swimming & Diving, Tennis, Track & Field, Volleyball, and Wrestling. In boys sports, the conference offers championships in Baseball, Basketball, Cross Country, Football, Golf, Soccer, Swimming & Diving, Tennis, Track & Field, and Wrestling.

The conference features All five of the public schools in Springfield and also the large central public schools in Rolla, Lebanon, and West Plains. Camdenton High School is the central school at the Lake of the Ozarks while Waynesville High School is the main high school for the military communities around the large Fort Leonard Wood army post, including Waynesville and St. Robert. The conference disbanded after the 2023-24 school year with Hillcrest, Bolivar, and West Plains joining the Ozark Mountain Conference, Glendale, Kickapoo, Lebanon, Waynesville, and Central joining the COC, Camdenton joining the CMAC, and Rolla and Parkview going independent.

== List of member schools ==
School	Team Name	Colors	Town	County	Enrollment (2015-16 & 2016–17)	Primary MSHSAA class*	Football class
Bolivar High School*	Liberators		Bolivar	Polk	1000	4	4
Camdenton High School	Lakers		Camdenton	Camden	1297	5	5
Glendale High School	Falcons		Springfield	Greene	1561	5	5
Hillcrest High School	Hornets		Springfield	Greene	1016	5	4
Central High School**	Bulldogs		Springfield	Greene	1612	5	5
Kickapoo High School	Chiefs		Springfield	Greene	1800	5	6
Lebanon High School	Yellowjackets		Lebanon	Laclede	1466	5	5
Parkview High School	Vikings		Springfield	Greene	1347	5	5
Rolla High School	Bulldogs		Rolla	Phelps	1273	5	5
Waynesville High School	Tigers		Waynesville	Pulaski	1627	5	6
West Plains High School*	Zizzers		West Plains	Howell	1092	5	4

As of the 2017/18 School year Joplin HS has swapped conferences to the COC. Replacing Joplin is former OC member Central.

Bolivar High School applied to join the OC after the COC Small Division dissolved–leaving Bolivar as an independent school. November 5, 2019, it was announced that Bolivar's football program would enter the Ozark Conference in 2020, replacing Central. Central will become an independent in football but remain in the OC in other sports. Bolivar will be a "football only" school in the OC and their other sports programs will remain independent. As of March 2020 Bolivar has been approved as a full member of the conference and will compete in all sports.

As of the 2024-25 school year, the schools joined the Central Ozark Conference (Central, Glendale, Parkview, Kickapoo, Lebanon, & Waynesville), Ozark Mountain Conference (Hillcrest & West Plains), Central Missouri Athletic Conference (Camdenton), and Rolla remained independent.

*As of 10/11/23 they are leaving the Ozark Conference to form new Ozark Mountain Conference.

**Central High School (Springfield, Mo) plays football as an Independent as of 2020.

== Reforming the conference ==
As of 2026-27 school year Lebanon, Camdenton, Waynesville, and Rolla announce they will be reforming the Ozark Conference starting the 2027-28 school year. As Lebanon and Waynesville leave the Central Ozark Conference and Camdenton leaving the Central Missouri Athletic Conference.

Other notable schools who may rejoin the former Ozark Conference are Hillcrest, West Plains, Glendale, Parkview, Central, and Bolivar. While Kickapoo may stay in the Central Ozark Conference, other schools might leave their conference to join the reformed Ozark Conference, such as Marshfeild, Logan-Rodgersville, Jefferson City, Capital City, and Helias Catholic (Jefferson City).
