= Frank Tristan =

American football coach (born c. 1981)

Current position
- Title: Head coach
- Team: Glendale HS (MO)
- Record: 0–0

Biographical details
- Born: c. 1981 (age 44–45)
- Education: Evangel University (2003)

Playing career

Football
- 1999–2002: Evangel

Baseball
- 2000–2003: Evangel

Coaching career (HC unless noted)

Football
- 2003–2004: Evangel (GA)
- 2005–?: Hillcrest HS (MO) (assistant)
- ?–2011: Kickapoo HS (MO) (DC)
- 2012–2014: SAGU (OC/OL)
- 2015–2017: SAGU
- 2018–2020: Western New Mexico
- 2021–2023: Willard HS (MO)
- 2024–present: Glendale HS (MO)

Head coaching record
- Overall: 21–33 (college); 7–27 (high school)

Frank Tristan (born c. 1981) is an American college football coach. He is the head football coach for Glendale High School in Springfield, Missouri, a position he has held since 2024. He was the head football coach for Southwestern Assemblies of God University from 2015 to 2017, Western New Mexico University from 2018 to 2020, and Willard High School in Willard, Missouri, from 2021 to 2023. He played college football and baseball for Evangel and also coached for Evangel, Hillcrest High School, and Kickapoo High School where he served as defensive coordinator.

== Head coaching record ==
=== College ===
Year	Team	Overall	Conference	Standing	Bowl/playoffs	Coaches'^{#}
SAGU Lions (Central States Football League) (2015–2017)
2015	SAGU	8–3	4–2	3rd	W Victory	
2016	SAGU	4–6	2–4	T–4th		
2017	SAGU	8–3	7–1	2nd	L Victory	19
SAGU:		20–12	13–7			
Western New Mexico Mustangs (Lone Star Conference) (2018–2020)
2018	Western New Mexico	0–10	0–8	9th		
2019	Western New Mexico	1–10	1–7	T–8th		
2020–21	Western New Mexico	0–1	0–0	N/A		
Western New Mexico:		1–21	1–15			
Total:		21–33				

=== High school ===
Year	Team	Overall	Conference	Standing	Bowl/playoffs
Willard Tigers () (2021–2023)
2021	Willard	1–11	0–9	10th	
2022	Willard	1–10	0–9	10th	
2023	Willard	5–6	4–5	6th	
Willard:		7–27	4–23		
Glendale Falcons () (2024–present)
2024	Glendale	0–0	0–0		
Glendale:		0–0	0–0		
Total:		7–27			
