= 2023–24 Arkansas Razorbacks men's basketball team =

American college basketball season

2023–24 Arkansas Razorbacks men's basketball
- Conference: Southeastern Conference
- Record: 16–17 (6–12 SEC)
- Head coach: Eric Musselman (5th season)
- Assistant coaches: Anthony Ruta (2nd season); Todd Lee (1st season); Ronnie Brewer (1st season); Michael Musselman (1st season); Keith Smart (3rd season)
- Home arena: Bud Walton Arena (Capacity: 19,368)

2023–24 Southeastern Conference men's basketball standings
| | Conf. | | | | Overall |
| Team | W | | L | PCT | W | | L | PCT |
|---|---|---|---|---|---|---|---|---|
| No. 5 Tennessee | 14 | – | 4 | .778 | 27 | – | 9 | .750 |
| No. 20 Kentucky | 13 | – | 5 | .722 | 23 | – | 10 | .697 |
| No. 3т Alabama | 13 | – | 5 | .722 | 25 | – | 12 | .676 |
| No. 18 Auburn † | 13 | – | 5 | .722 | 27 | – | 8 | .771 |
| No. 25 South Carolina | 13 | – | 5 | .722 | 26 | – | 8 | .765 |
| Florida | 11 | – | 7 | .611 | 24 | – | 12 | .667 |
| Texas A&M | 9 | – | 9 | .500 | 21 | – | 15 | .583 |
| LSU | 9 | – | 9 | .500 | 17 | – | 16 | .515 |
| Mississippi State | 8 | – | 10 | .444 | 21 | – | 14 | .600 |
| Ole Miss | 7 | – | 11 | .389 | 20 | – | 12 | .625 |
| Georgia | 6 | – | 12 | .333 | 20 | – | 17 | .541 |
| Arkansas | 6 | – | 12 | .333 | 16 | – | 17 | .485 |
| Vanderbilt | 4 | – | 14 | .222 | 9 | – | 23 | .281 |
| Missouri | 0 | – | 18 | .000 | 8 | – | 24 | .250 |
† 2024 SEC tournament winner Rankings from AP poll

The 2023–24 Arkansas Razorbacks men's basketball team represented the University of Arkansas during the 2023–24 NCAA Division I men's basketball season. The team was led by head coach Eric Musselman in his fifth and final year, and played its home games at Bud Walton Arena in Fayetteville, Arkansas as a member of the Southeastern Conference. They finished the season 16–17, 6–12 in SEC play to finish in a tie for 11th place. As the No. 12 seed in the SEC tournament, they defeated Vanderbilt before losing to South Carolina in the second round. It was Arkansas' first losing season since 2009-10.

On April 4, 2024, head coach Eric Musselman left the school to become the head coach at USC. On April 10, the school hired Kentucky coach John Calipari as the team's new head coach.

The Arkansas Razorbacks men's basketball team drew an average home attendance of 19,106 in 18 games in 2023–24.

== Previous season ==
The Razorbacks finished the 2022–23 season 22–14, 8–10 in SEC play to finish in a tie for ninth place. In the SEC tournament, the Razorbacks defeated Auburn in the second round before losing to Texas A&M in the quarterfinals. They received an at-large bid to the NCAA tournament as the No. 8 seed in the West. They would defeat Illinois before upsetting No. 1 seeded Kansas in the second round to advance to the Sweet Sixteen for the third consecutive year. There they lost to eventual national champion UConn.

== Offseason ==
=== Departures ===
| Name | Number | Pos. | Height | Weight | Year | Hometown | Reason for departure |
|---|---|---|---|---|---|---|---|
| Anthony Black | 0 | G | 6'7" | 198 | Freshman | Duncanville, TX | Declared for 2023 NBA draft |
| Ricky Council IV | 1 | G | 6'6" | 205 | Junior | Durham, NC | Declared for 2023 NBA draft |
| Nick Smith Jr. | 3 | G | 6'5" | 185 | Freshman | Jacksonville, AR | Declared for 2023 NBA draft |
| Jordan Walsh | 13 | F | 6'7" | 205 | Freshman | Desoto, TX | Declared for 2023 NBA draft |
| Barry Dunning | 12 | G | 6'6" | 195 | Freshman | Mobile, AL | Transferred to UAB |
| Makhel Mitchell | 22 | F | 6'10" | 240 | Senior | Washington, D.C. | Transferred to Little Rock |
| Derrian Ford | 23 | G | 6'3" | 205 | Freshman | Magnolia, AR | Transferred to Arkansas State |

=== Incoming transfers ===
| Name | Number | Pos. | Height | Weight | Year | Hometown | Previous School |
|---|---|---|---|---|---|---|---|
| Khalif Battle | 0 | G | 6'5" | 185 | Senior | Metuchen, NJ | Temple |
| Keyon Menifield | 1 | G | 6'1" | 150 | Sophomore | Flint, MI | Washington |
| El Ellis | 3 | G | 6'3" | 180 | Senior | Durham, NC | Louisville |
| Denijay Harris | 7 | F | 6'7" | 200 | Senior | Columbus, MS | Southern Miss |
| Tramon Mark | 12 | G | 6'6" | 185 | Junior | Dickinson, TX | Houston |
| Chandler Lawson | 14 | F | 6'8" | 215 | Senior | Memphis, TN | Memphis |
| Jeremiah Davenport | 24 | F | 6'6" | 215 | Senior | Cincinnati, OH | Cincinnati |

=== Recruiting classes ===
==== 2023 recruiting class ====
Arkansas signed two high school athletes for the 2023 class, which can sign in the early signing period in November 2022.

College recruiting information
| Name | Hometown | School | Height | Weight | Commit date |
|---|---|---|---|---|---|
| Layden Blocker; PG | Little Rock, Arkansas | Sunrise Christian Academy Wichita, Kansas | 6 ft 2 in (1.88 m) | 180 lb (82 kg) | Jun 25, 2022 |
| Layden Blocker; PG | Recruit ratings: Rivals: 247Sports: On3: ESPN: (88) | | | | |
| Baye Fall; C | Dakar, Senegal | Accelerated Schools Denver, Colorado | 6 ft 10 in (2.08 m) | 210 lb (95 kg) | Nov 15, 2022 |
| Baye Fall; C | Recruit ratings: Rivals: 247Sports: On3: ESPN: (88) | | | | |
Overall recruit ranking: Rivals: 21 247Sports: 13 On3: 11 ESPN: 20
Note: In many cases, Scout, Rivals, 247Sports, On3, and ESPN may conflict in their listings of height and weight.; In these cases, the average was taken. ESPN grades are on a 100-point scale.; Sources: "Arkansas 2023 Basketball Commitments". Rivals.; "2023 Team Ranking". Rivals.

==== 2024 recruiting class ====
College recruiting information (2023)
| Name | Hometown | School | Height | Weight | Commit date |
|---|---|---|---|---|---|
| Isaiah Elohim; SG | Chatsworth, California | Sierra Canyon | 6 ft 5 in (1.96 m) | 190 lb (86 kg) | Oct 5, 2023 |
| Isaiah Elohim; SG | Recruit ratings: Rivals: 247Sports: On3: ESPN: (87) | | | | |
| Jalen Shelley; SF | Frisco, Texas | Link Academy Branson, Missouri | 6 ft 8 in (2.03 m) | 190 lb (86 kg) | Sep 11, 2023 |
| Jalen Shelley; SF | Recruit ratings: Rivals: 247Sports: On3: ESPN: (87) | | | | |
Overall recruit ranking: Rivals: 12 247Sports: 14 On3: 8
Note: In many cases, Scout, Rivals, 247Sports, On3, and ESPN may conflict in their listings of height and weight.; In these cases, the average was taken. ESPN grades are on a 100-point scale.; Sources: "Arkansas 2024 Basketball Commitments". Rivals.; "2024 Team Ranking". Rivals.

== Roster ==
2023–24 Arkansas Razorbacks men's basketball team
Players
Coaches

| Pos. | # | Name | Height | Weight | Year | Previous school | Hometown |
|---|---|---|---|---|---|---|---|
| G | 0 | Khalif Battle | 6 ft 5 in (1.96 m) | 185 lb (84 kg) | Sr | Trenton Catholic High School (Trenton, New Jersey); Temple | Hillside, New Jersey |
| G | 1 | Keyon Menifield | 6 ft 1 in (1.85 m) | 150 lb (68 kg) | So | PHHoenix Prep HS (Phoenix, Arizona); Washington | Flint, Michigan |
| F | 2 | Trevon Brazile | 6 ft 10 in (2.08 m) | 220 lb (100 kg) | So | Kickapoo HS; Missouri | Springfield, Missouri |
| G | 3 | El Ellis | 6 ft 3 in (1.91 m) | 180 lb (82 kg) | Sr | Quality Education Academy (Winston-Salem, North Carolina); Louisville | Durham, North Carolina |
| G | 4 | Davonte Davis | 6 ft 4 in (1.93 m) | 185 lb (84 kg) | Sr | Jacksonville HS | Jacksonville, Arkansas |
| G | 5 | Joseph Pinion | 6 ft 5 in (1.96 m) | 195 lb (88 kg) | So | Morrilton High School | Morrilton, Arkansas |
| G | 6 | Layden Blocker | 6 ft 2 in (1.88 m) | 175 lb (79 kg) | Fr | Sunrise Christian Academy (Bel Aire, Kansas) | Little Rock, Arkansas |
| F | 7 | Denijay Harris | 6 ft 7 in (2.01 m) | 200 lb (91 kg) | Sr | Columbus HS (Columbus, Mississippi); Southern Miss | Columbus, Mississippi |
| C | 10 | Baye Fall | 6 ft 11 in (2.11 m) | 200 lb (91 kg) | Fr | Accelerated Schools (Denver, Colorado) | Dakar, Senegal |
| F | 11 | Jalen Graham | 6 ft 10 in (2.08 m) | 220 lb (100 kg) | Sr | Mountain Pointe High School; Arizona State | Phoenix, Arizona |
| G | 12 | Tramon Mark | 6 ft 6 in (1.98 m) | 185 lb (84 kg) | Jr | Dickinson HS; Houston | Dickinson, Texas |
| F | 8 | Chandler Lawson | 6 ft 8 in (2.03 m) | 210 lb (95 kg) | Sr | Wooddale HS; Memphis | Memphis, Tennessee |
| C | 15 | Makhi Mitchell | 6 ft 10 in (2.08 m) | 240 lb (109 kg) | Sr | Jackson-Reed High School; Rhode Island | Washington, D.C. |
| G | 21 | Cade Arbogast (W) | 6 ft 3 in (1.91 m) | 180 lb (82 kg) | RS Sr | De La Salle High School; Lane Community College | Concord, California |
| F | 24 | Jeremiah Davenport | 6 ft 6 in (1.98 m) | 215 lb (98 kg) | Sr | Hargrave Military Academy (Chatham, Virginia); Cincinnati | Cincinnati, Ohio |
| C | 45 | Lawson Blake (W) | 6 ft 10 in (2.08 m) | 240 lb (109 kg) | Jr | Fayetteville High School; Link Year Prep | Fayetteville, Arkansas |

Head coach

- Eric Musselman (San Diego)

Assistant coach(es)

- Keith Smart (Indiana)
- Anthony Ruta (Arizona State)
- Todd Lee (South Dakota)
- Michael Musselman, Director of Recruiting (San Diego)
- Ronnie Brewer, Recruiting Coordinator (Arkansas)

Legend

- (C) Team captain
- (S) Suspended
- (I) Ineligible
- (W) Walk-on
- Injured
- Current redshirt

== Schedule and results ==
| Date time, TV | Rank^{#} | Opponent^{#} | Result | Record | High points | High rebounds | High assists | Site (attendance) city, state |
Exhibition
| October 20, 2023*; 6:30 p.m. | No. 14 | UT Tyler | W 92–39 | – | 14 – Battle | 7 – Davis | 4 – Ellis | Bud Walton Arena (7,046); Fayetteville, AR |
| October 28, 2023*; 3:00 p.m., SECN+/ESPN+ | No. 14 | No. 3 Purdue; Charity exhibition | W 81–77 ^{OT} | – | 15 – Tied | 6 – Mark | 4 – Brazile | Bud Walton Arena (19,200); Fayetteville, AR |
Non-conference regular season
| November 6, 2023*; 7:00 p.m., SECN+/ESPN+ | No. 14 | Alcorn State | W 93–59 | 1–0 | 21 – Battle | 8 – Graham | 5 – Davis | Bud Walton Arena (19,200); Fayetteville, AR |
| November 10, 2023*; 7:00 p.m., SECN+/ESPN+ | No. 14 | Gardner–Webb | W 86–68 | 2–0 | 21 – Battle | 7 – Brazile | 3 – Ellis | Bud Walton Arena (19,200); Fayetteville, AR |
| November 13, 2023*; 7:00 p.m., SECN+/ESPN+ | No. 14 | Old Dominion | W 86–77 | 3–0 | 17 – Ellis | 10 – Mitchell | 8 – Ellis | Bud Walton Arena (19,200); Fayetteville, AR |
| November 17, 2023*; 7:00 p.m., SECN+/ESPN+ | No. 14 | UNC Greensboro | L 72–78 | 3–1 | 21 – Mark | 9 – Brazile | 2 – Tied | Bud Walton Arena (19,200); Fayetteville, AR |
| November 22, 2023*; 2:30 p.m., ESPNU | No. 20 | vs. Stanford; Battle 4 Atlantis quarterfinals | W 77–74 ^{2OT} | 4–1 | 25 – Mark | 17 – Brazile | 3 – Davis | Imperial Arena (820); Paradise Island, Bahamas |
| November 23, 2023*; 4:00 p.m., ESPN | No. 20 | vs. Memphis; Battle 4 Atlantis semifinals | L 79–84 | 4–2 | 21 – Battle | 10 – Brazile | 3 – Ellis | Imperial Arena (982); Paradise Island, Bahamas |
| November 24, 2023*; 12:00 p.m., ESPN2 | No. 20 | vs. No. 14 North Carolina; Battle 4 Atlantis 3rd place game | L 72–87 | 4–3 | 34 – Mark | 5 – Mark | 2 – Lawson | Imperial Arena (1,456); Paradise Island, Bahamas |
| November 29, 2023*; 8:15 p.m., ESPN | | No. 7 Duke; ACC–SEC Challenge | W 80–75 | 5–3 | 21 – Battle | 11 – Brazile | 6 – Ellis | Bud Walton Arena (20,344); Fayetteville, AR |
| December 4, 2023*; 7:00 p.m., SECN+/ESPN+ | | Furman | W 97–83 | 6–3 | 25 – Battle | 10 – Davis | 8 – Davis | Bud Walton Arena (19,200); Fayetteville, AR |
| December 9, 2023*; 3:00 p.m., ESPN2 | | vs. No. 19 Oklahoma; Crimson & Cardinal Classic | L 70–79 | 6–4 | 13 – Battle | 6 – Mitchell | 2 – Tied | BOK Center (17,485); Tulsa, OK |
| December 16, 2023*; 5:00 p.m., SECN+/ESPN+ | | vs. Lipscomb | W 69–66 | 7–4 | 17 – Mark | 6 – Brazile | 4 – Blocker | Simmons Bank Arena (16,361); North Little Rock, AR |
| December 21, 2023*; 6:00 p.m., SECN | | Abilene Christian | W 83–73 | 8–4 | 25 – Mark | 11 – Mark | 2 – Tied | Bud Walton Arena (19,200); Fayetteville, AR |
| December 30, 2023*; 6:00 p.m., SECN | | UNC Wilmington | W 106–90 | 9–4 | 32 – Menifield | 8 – Brazile | 6 – Davis | Bud Walton Arena (19,200); Fayetteville, AR |
SEC regular season
| January 6, 2024; 1:00 p.m., ESPN2 | | No. 25 Auburn | L 51–83 | 9–5 (0–1) | 14 – Menifield | 7 – Brazile | 4 – Menifield | Bud Walton Arena (19,200); Fayetteville, AR |
| January 10, 2024; 8:00 p.m., ESPNU | | at Georgia | L 66–76 | 9–6 (0–2) | 24 – Mark | 7 – Mark | 3 – Tied | Stegeman Coliseum (7,820); Athens, GA |
| January 13, 2024; 4:00 p.m., ESPN | | at Florida | L 68–90 | 9–7 (0–3) | 14 – Blocker | 7 – Brazile | 3 – Davenport | O'Connell Center (10,445); Gainesville, FL |
| January 16, 2024; 8:00 p.m., SECN | | Texas A&M | W 78–77 | 10–7 (1–3) | 35 – Mark | 6 – Tied | 4 – Lawson | Bud Walton Arena (19,200); Fayetteville, AR |
| January 20, 2024; 12:00 p.m., SECN | | South Carolina | L 64–77 | 10–8 (1–4) | 18 – Mark | 7 – Lawson | 2 – Ellis | Bud Walton Arena (19,200); Fayetteville, AR |
| January 24, 2024; 8:00 p.m., ESPNU | | at Ole Miss | L 51–77 | 10–9 (1–5) | 11 – Battle | 4 – Tied | 3 – Blocker | SJB Pavilion (8,207); Oxford, MS |
| January 27, 2024; 5:00 p.m., ESPN | | No. 6 Kentucky; College GameDay | L 57–63 | 10–10 (1–6) | 12 – Mitchell | 13 – Mitchell | 3 – Mark | Bud Walton Arena (19,200); Fayetteville, AR |
| January 31, 2024; 7:30 p.m., SECN | | at Missouri | W 91–84 | 11–10 (2–6) | 22 – Mark | 14 – Mitchell | 4 – Graham | Mizzou Arena (11,020); Columbia, MO |
| February 3, 2024; 11:00 a.m., ESPN2 | | at LSU | L 74–95 | 11–11 (2–7) | 20 – Mark | 6 – Mark | 4 – Mitchell | Pete Maravich Assembly Center (7,880); Baton Rouge, LA |
| February 10, 2024; 5:00 p.m., SECN | | Georgia | W 78–75 | 12–11 (3–7) | 15 – Tied | 5 – Tied | 3 – Tied | Bud Walton Arena (19,200); Fayetteville, AR |
| February 14, 2024; 8:00 p.m., ESPN2 | | No. 8 Tennessee | L 63–92 | 12–12 (3–8) | 12 – Mark | 7 – Graham | 4 – Davis | Bud Walton Arena (19,200); Fayetteville, AR |
| February 17, 2024; 1:00 p.m., ESPNU | | at Mississippi State | L 67–71 | 12–13 (3–9) | 21 – Mitchell | 9 – Mitchell | 4 – Ellis | Humphrey Coliseum (9,219); Starkville, MS |
| February 20, 2024; 6:00 p.m., ESPN | | at Texas A&M | W 78–71 | 13–13 (4–9) | 26 – Mark | 13 – Mitchell | 5 – Mark | Reed Arena (8,789); College Station, TX |
| February 24, 2024; 11:00 a.m., ESPN2 | | Missouri | W 88–73 | 14–13 (5–9) | 42 – Battle | 9 – Davis | 6 – Davis | Bud Walton Arena (19,200); Fayetteville, AR |
| February 27, 2024; 8:00 p.m., SECN | | Vanderbilt | L 82–85 | 14–14 (5–10) | 36 – Battle | 6 – Tied | 3 – Tied | Bud Walton Arena (19,200); Fayetteville, AR |
| March 2, 2024; 12:30 p.m., CBS | | at No. 16 Kentucky | L 102–111 | 14–15 (5–11) | 34 – Battle | 8 – Battle | 3 – Mark | Rupp Arena (20,322); Lexington, KY |
| March 6, 2024; 6:00 p.m., SECN | | LSU | W 94–83 | 15–15 (6–11) | 29 – Battle | 8 – Mark | 5 – Mark | Bud Walton Arena (19,200); Fayetteville, AR |
| March 9, 2024; 11:00 a.m., ESPN | | at No. 16 Alabama | L 88–92 ^{OT} | 15–16 (6–12) | 22 – Battle | 7 – Battle | 3 – Ellis | Coleman Coliseum (11,031); Tuscaloosa, AL |
SEC Tournament
| March 13, 2024; 6:00 p.m., SECN | (12) | vs. (13) Vanderbilt; First Round | W 90–85 ^{OT} | 16–16 | 24 – Battle | 12 – Brazile | 3 – Tied | Bridgestone Arena; Nashville, TN |
| March 14, 2024; 2:30 p.m., SECN | (12) | vs. (5) No. 15 South Carolina; Second Round | L 66–80 | 16–17 | 20 – Battle | 7 – Battle | 4 – Graham | Bridgestone Arena (11,638); Nashville, TN |
*Non-conference game. ^{#}Rankings from AP Poll. (#) Tournament seedings in parentheses. All times are in Central Time.

== Rankings ==
Ranking movements Legend: ██ Increase in ranking ██ Decrease in ranking — = Not ranked RV = Received votes
| | Week | | | | | | | | | | | | | | | | | | | | |
| Poll | Pre | 1 | 2 | 3 | 4 | 5 | 6 | 7 | 8 | 9 | 10 | 11 | 12 | 13 | 14 | 15 | 16 | 17 | 18 | 19 | Final |
|---|---|---|---|---|---|---|---|---|---|---|---|---|---|---|---|---|---|---|---|---|---|
| AP | 14 | 14 | 20 | RV | RV | — | — | — | — | — | — | — | — | — | — | — | — | — | — | — | RV |
| Coaches | 14 | 14 | RV | RV | — | — | — | — | — | — | — | — | — | — | — | — | — | — | — | — | — |

*AP does not release post-NCAA Tournament rankings.
