= 2022–23 Arkansas Razorbacks men's basketball team =

American college basketball season

2022–23 Arkansas Razorbacks men's basketball

NCAA tournament, Sweet Sixteen
- Conference: Southeastern Conference

Ranking
- Coaches: No. 21
- Record: 22–14 (8–10 SEC)
- Head coach: Eric Musselman (4th season)
- Assistant coaches: Gus Argenal (2nd season); Anthony Ruta (1st season); Keith Smart (2nd season)
- Home arena: Bud Walton Arena (Capacity: 19,368)

2022–23 Southeastern Conference men's basketball standings
	Conf.				Overall
Team	W		L	PCT	W		L	PCT
No. 1 Alabama†	16	–	2	.889	31	–	6	.838
No. 17 Texas A&M	15	–	3	.833	25	–	10	.714
Kentucky	12	–	6	.667	22	–	12	.647
No. 23 Missouri	11	–	7	.611	25	–	10	.714
No. 20 Tennessee	11	–	7	.611	25	–	11	.694
Vanderbilt	11	–	7	.611	22	–	15	.595
Auburn	10	–	8	.556	21	–	13	.618
Florida	9	–	9	.500	16	–	17	.485
Mississippi State	8	–	10	.444	21	–	13	.618
Arkansas	8	–	10	.444	22	–	14	.611
Georgia	6	–	12	.333	16	–	16	.500
South Carolina	4	–	14	.222	11	–	21	.344
Ole Miss	3	–	15	.167	12	–	21	.364
LSU	2	–	16	.111	14	–	19	.424
† 2023 SEC tournament winner Rankings from AP poll

The 2022–23 Arkansas Razorbacks men's basketball team represented the University of Arkansas during the 2022–23 NCAA Division I men's basketball season. The team was led by fourth-year head coach Eric Musselman, and played its home games at Bud Walton Arena in Fayetteville, Arkansas as a member of the Southeastern Conference. They finished the season 19–12, 8–10 in SEC Play to finish in a tie for 9th place. In the SEC tournament, the Razorbacks defeated Auburn in the second round before being defeated by Texas A&M in the quarterfinals. They received an at-large bid to the NCAA Tournament as a No. 8 seed in the West Region. They defeated Illinois in the first round and upset No. 1 seed Kansas to reach the Sweet Sixteen. There, they were defeated by No. 4 seed, and eventual tournament champions, UConn, ending their season with an overall 22–14 record.

== Previous season ==
Arkansas followed up an Elite Eight appearance in 2021 with another in 2022, even though the Razorbacks didn't finish as high in the SEC as they had a year prior. This time they were fourth in the final SEC standings, and earned a 4 seed in the NCAA tournament. Arkansas was sent to Buffalo, New York where they dispatched Vermont and New Mexico State to advance to the Sweet 16 for the second year in a row.

In the regional semifinals against overall top seeded Gonzaga, Arkansas secured a 74–68 upset victory at the Chase Center in San Francisco. This set up an Elite Eight showdown with Duke, in the final year of head coach Mike Krzyzewski's 43-year stint with the Blue Devils.

Duke defeated the Razorbacks 78–69 to advance to the Final Four. The Razorbacks finished with a record of 28–9.

== Offseason ==
=== Departures ===
Name	Number	Pos.	Height	Weight	Year	Hometown	Notes
Stanley Umude	0	G	6'6"	210	Graduate Student	San Antonio, Texas	Graduated
JD Notae	1	G	6'2"	190	Senior	Covington, Georgia	Declared for 2022 NBA draft
KK Robinson	2	G	6'0"	180	Sophomore	Little Rock, Arkansas	Transferred to Texas A&M
Trey Wade	3	F	6'6"	220	Graduate Student	Marietta, Georgia	Graduated
Au'Diese Toney	5	G	6'6"	205	Senior	Huntsville, Alabama	Graduated
Chris Lykes	11	G	5'7"	160	Graduate Student	Mitchellville, Maryland	Graduated
Jaylin Williams	10	F	6'10"	240	Sophomore	Fort Smith, Arkansas	Declared for 2022 NBA draft
Chance Moore	13	G	6'5"	195	Freshman	Brookhaven, Georgia	Transferred to Missouri State
Jaxson Robinson	14	G	6'6"	185	Sophomore	Ada, Oklahoma	Transferred to BYU
Connor Vanover	23	F	7'3"	235	Junior	Little Rock, Arkansas	Transferred to Oral Roberts

=== Incoming transfers ===
Name	Number	Pos.	Height	Weight	Year	Hometown	Transfer from	Eligibility
Ricky Council IV	1	G	6'6"	205	Junior	Durham, North Carolina	Wichita State	Three years, beginning immediately
Trevon Brazile	2	F	6'10"	200	Sophomore	Springfield, Missouri	Missouri	Three years, beginning immediately
Jalen Graham	11	F	6'9"	225	Senior	Phoenix, Arizona	Arizona State	Two years, beginning immediately
Makhi Mitchell	15	F/C	6'9"	230	Senior	Washington, D.C.	Rhode Island	Two years, beginning immediately
Makhel Mitchell	22	F/C	6'10"	240	Senior	Washington, D.C.	Rhode Island	Two years, beginning immediately

=== 2022 Recruiting Class ===
With his third signing class, Eric Musselman signed the nation's second-ranked class (just behind Duke), with three 5* signees and three 4* signees. Guard Nick Smith finished ranked in the overall Top 5 of every major rankings service, and ended up ranked as the #1 overall recruit in the nation by 247Sports when their final rankings were released in May 2022.

College recruiting information (2022)
Name	Hometown	School	Height	Weight	Commit date
Nick Smith Jr. CG	North Little Rock, Arkansas	North Little Rock High School	6 ft 5 in (1.96 m)	185 lb (84 kg)	Sep 29, 2021
Nick Smith Jr. CG	Recruit ratings: Rivals: 247Sports: ESPN: (93)				
Jordan Walsh; SF	Cedar Hill, Texas	Link Academy (Branson, MO)	6 ft 7 in (2.01 m)	195 lb (88 kg)	Oct 14, 2021
Jordan Walsh; SF	Recruit ratings: Rivals: 247Sports: ESPN: (93)				
Anthony Black; PG / SF	Duncanville, TX	Duncanville High School	6 ft 7 in (2.01 m)	190 lb (86 kg)	Mar 28, 2022
Anthony Black; PG / SF	Recruit ratings: Rivals: 247Sports: ESPN: (90)				
Derrian Ford; CG	Magnolia, AR	Magnolia High School	6 ft 4 in (1.93 m)	200 lb (91 kg)	Jul 14, 2021
Derrian Ford; CG	Recruit ratings: Rivals: 247Sports: ESPN: (83)				
Barry Dunning; SF	Mobile, AL	McGill-Toolen Catholic High School	6 ft 6 in (1.98 m)	205 lb (93 kg)	Jul 5, 2021
Barry Dunning; SF	Recruit ratings: Rivals: 247Sports: ESPN: (83)				
Joseph Pinion; SG	Morrilton, AR	Morrilton High School	6 ft 5 in (1.96 m)	185 lb (84 kg)	Oct 23, 2020
Joseph Pinion; SG	Recruit ratings: Rivals: 247Sports: ESPN: (82)				
Overall recruit ranking: Rivals: 2 247Sports: 2 ESPN: 2
Note: In many cases, Scout, Rivals, 247Sports, On3, and ESPN may conflict in their listings of height and weight.; In these cases, the average was taken. ESPN grades are on a 100-point scale.; Sources: "Arkansas 2021 Basketball Commitments". Rivals.; "2021 Team Ranking". Rivals.

=== 2023 Recruiting Class ===
Arkansas currently has two verbal commitments for the 2023 class, which can sign in the early signing period in November 2022.

College recruiting information (2023)
Name	Hometown	School	Height	Weight	Commit date
Layden Blocker; PG	Little Rock, Arkansas	Sunrise Christian Academy Wichita, Kansas	6 ft 2 in (1.88 m)	180 lb (82 kg)	Jun 25, 2022
Layden Blocker; PG	Recruit ratings: Rivals: 247Sports: On3: ESPN: (89)				
Baye Fall; C	Dakar, Senegal	Accelerated Schools Denver, Colorado	6 ft 11 in (2.11 m)	215 lb (98 kg)	Nov 15, 2022
Baye Fall; C	Recruit ratings: Rivals: 247Sports: On3: ESPN: (90)				
Overall recruit ranking: Rivals: 13 247Sports: 27 On3: 5 ESPN: 10
Note: In many cases, Scout, Rivals, 247Sports, On3, and ESPN may conflict in their listings of height and weight.; In these cases, the average was taken. ESPN grades are on a 100-point scale.; Sources: "Arkansas 2023 Basketball Commitments". Rivals.; "2023 Team Ranking". Rivals.

== Roster ==
2022–23 Arkansas Razorbacks men's basketball team
Players
Coaches

Pos.	#	Name	Height	Weight	Year	Previous school	Hometown
G	0	Anthony Black	6 ft 7 in (2.01 m)	198 lb (90 kg)	Fr	Duncanville High School	Duncanville, Texas
G	1	Ricky Council IV	6 ft 6 in (1.98 m)	205 lb (93 kg)	Jr	Southern Durham HS; Wichita State	Durham, North Carolina
F	2	Trevon Brazile	6 ft 10 in (2.08 m)	212 lb (96 kg)	So	Kickapoo HS; Missouri	Springfield, Missouri
G	3	Nick Smith Jr.	6 ft 5 in (1.96 m)	185 lb (84 kg)	Fr	North Little Rock High School	Jacksonville, Arkansas
G	4	Davonte Davis	6 ft 4 in (1.93 m)	185 lb (84 kg)	Jr	Jacksonville HS	Jacksonville, Arkansas
G	5	Joseph Pinion	6 ft 5 in (1.96 m)	190 lb (86 kg)	Fr	Morrilton High School	Morrilton, Arkansas
F	11	Jalen Graham	6 ft 9 in (2.06 m)	225 lb (102 kg)	Sr	Mountain Pointe High School; Arizona State	Phoenix, Arizona
G	12	Barry Dunning Jr.	6 ft 6 in (1.98 m)	195 lb (88 kg)	Fr	McGill–Toolen Catholic High School	Mobile, Alabama
G	13	Jordan Walsh	6 ft 7 in (2.01 m)	205 lb (93 kg)	Fr	Link Year Prep	DeSoto, Texas
F	15	Makhi Mitchell	6 ft 9 in (2.06 m)	230 lb (104 kg)	Sr	Jackson-Reed High School; Rhode Island	Washington, D.C.
F	20	Kamani Johnson	6 ft 7 in (2.01 m)	230 lb (104 kg)	RS Sr	Holy Spirit Preparatory School; UALR	Brooklyn, New York
G	21	Cade Arbogast	6 ft 3 in (1.91 m)	180 lb (82 kg)	RS Jr	De La Salle High School; Lane Community College	Concord, California
F	22	Makhel Mitchell	6 ft 10 in (2.08 m)	240 lb (109 kg)	Sr	Jackson-Reed High School; Rhode Island	Washington, D.C.
G	23	Derrian Ford	6 ft 3 in (1.91 m)	205 lb (93 kg)	Fr	Magnolia, Arkansas	Magnolia, Arkansas
F	45	Lawson Blake (W)	6 ft 10 in (2.08 m)	225 lb (102 kg)	So	Fayetteville High School; Link Year Prep	Fayetteville, Arkansas

Head coach

- Eric Musselman (San Diego)

Assistant coach(es)

- Keith Smart (Indiana)
- Anthony Ruta (Arizona State)
- Gus Argenal (UC Davis)

Legend

- (C) Team captain
- (S) Suspended
- (I) Ineligible
- (W) Walk-on
- Injured
- Current redshirt

Roster
Last update: July 4, 2022

== Schedule ==
Date time, TV	Rank^{#}	Opponent^{#}	Result	Record	High points	High rebounds	High assists	Site (attendance) city, state
European exhibition trip
August 9, 2022*; 12:30 pm, FloHoops		vs. Valencia Seleccion	W 108–59		21 – Smith Jr.	9 – Johnson	7 – Black	La Alqueria del Basket; Valencia
August 11, 2022*; 1:30 pm, FloHoops		vs. Catalan Elite	W 99–86		17 – 2 tied	12 – Johnson	n/a – n/a	Pavelló Poliesportiu Municipal de Tiana; Barcelona
August 13, 2022*; 12:30 pm, FloHoops		vs. Orange 1 Basket Bassano	W 75–54		20 – Smith Jr.	8 – Johnson	5 – Davis	PalaSampietro – Casnate con Bernate; Como
August 15, 2022*; 12:00 pm, FloHoops		vs. Bakken Bears	W 70–59		28 – Brazile	9 – Brazile	7 – Black	PalaSampietro – Casnate con Bernate; Como, Italy
Exhibition
October 24, 2022*; 7:00 p.m.	No. 10	Rogers State	W 83–49		15 – Pinion	7 – Walsh	5 – Black	Bud Walton Arena (19,200); Fayetteville, AR
October 29, 2022*; 3:00 p.m.	No. 10	at No. 12 Texas; Charity exhibition	L 60–90		14 – Walsh	6 – Johnson	3 – Davis	Moody Center (7,271); Austin, TX
Non-conference regular season
November 7, 2022*; 7:00 p.m., SECN+/ESPN+	No. 10	North Dakota State	W 76–58	1–0	22 – Council IV	12 – Brazile	3 – Tied	Bud Walton Arena (19,200); Fayetteville, AR
November 11, 2022*; 7:00 p.m., SECN+/ESPN+	No. 10	Fordham	W 74–48	2–0	15 – Council IV	8 – Brazile	7 – Council IV	Bud Walton Arena (19,200); Fayetteville, AR
November 16, 2022*; 7:00 p.m., SECN+/ESPN+	No. 9	South Dakota State	W 71–56	3–0	22 – Council IV	10 – Brazile	5 – Black	Bud Walton Arena (19,200); Fayetteville, AR
November 21, 2022*; 4:00 p.m., ESPN2	No. 9	vs. Louisville; Maui Invitational Tournament quarterfinals	W 80–54	4–0	26 – Black	6 – Tied	6 – Black	Lahaina Civic Center (2,400); Maui, HI
November 22, 2022*; 7:00 p.m., ESPN	No. 9	vs. No. 10 Creighton; Maui Invitational Tournament semifinals	L 87–90	4–1	26 – Black	6 – Tied	6 – Black	Lahaina Civic Center (2,400); Maui, HI
November 23, 2022*; 9:00 p.m., ESPN2	No. 9	vs. No. 17 San Diego State; Maui Invitational Tournament 3rd place game	W 78–74 ^{OT}	5–1	20 – Brazile	9 – Brazile	4 – Council IV	Lahaina Civic Center (2,400); Maui, HI
November 28, 2022*; 7:00 p.m., SECN	No. 11т	Troy	W 74–61	6–1	27 – Council IV	9 – Makhi Mitchell	3 – Walsh	Bud Walton Arena (19,200); Fayetteville, AR
December 3, 2022*; 3:00 p.m., SECN	No. 11т	San Jose State	W 99–58	7–1	23 – Brazile	6 – Graham	6 – Black	Bud Walton Arena (19,200); Fayetteville, AR
December 6, 2022*; 6:00 p.m., SECN	No. 9	UNC Greensboro	W 65–58	8–1	22 – Smith Jr.	14 – Makhi Mitchell	3 – Smith Jr.	Bud Walton Arena (19,200); Fayetteville, AR
December 10, 2022*; 12:00 p.m., ESPN2	No. 9	vs. Oklahoma; The Crimson and Cardinal Classic	W 88–78	9–1	26 – Council IV	6 – Makhi Mitchell	5 – Tied	BOK Center (14,201); Tulsa, OK
December 17, 2022*; 3:00 p.m.	No. 10	vs. Bradley	W 76–57	10–1	18 – Walsh	7 – Davis	4 – Black	Simmons Bank Arena (16,675); North Little Rock, AR
December 21, 2022*; 8:00 p.m., SECN	No. 10	UNC Asheville	W 85–51	11–1	16 – Graham	7 – Johnson	3 – Tied	Bud Walton Arena (19,200); Fayetteville, AR
SEC regular season
December 28, 2022; 8:00 p.m., ESPN2	No. 9	at LSU	L 57–60	11–2 (0–1)	16 – Davis	12 – Makhi Mitchell	4 – Black	Pete Maravich Assembly Center (10,428); Baton Rouge, LA
January 4, 2023; 7:30 p.m., SECN	No. 13	No. 20 Missouri	W 74–68	12–2 (1–1)	25 – Council IV	8 – Johnson	5 – Tied	Bud Walton Arena (19,200); Fayetteville, AR
January 7, 2023; 7:30 p.m., SECN	No. 13	at No. 22 Auburn	L 59–72	12–3 (1–2)	23 – Black	10 – Walsh	4 – Black	Neville Arena (9,121); Auburn, AL
January 11, 2023; 6:00 p.m., ESPN2	No. 15	No. 4 Alabama	L 69–84	12–4 (1–3)	16 – Tied	10 – Davis	3 – Tied	Bud Walton Arena (19,200); Fayetteville, AR
January 14, 2023; 1:00 p.m., ESPNU	No. 15	at Vanderbilt	L 84–97	12–5 (1–4)	24 – Council IV	8 – Makhi Mitchell	4 – Davis	Memorial Gymnasium (9,362); Nashville, TN
January 18, 2023; 8:00 p.m., SECN	No. 25	at Missouri	L 76–79	12–6 (1–5)	18 – Davis	9 – Tied	7 – Black	Mizzou Arena (14,448); Columbia, MO
January 21, 2023; 11:00 a.m., ESPN2	No. 25	Ole Miss	W 69–57	13–6 (2–5)	17 – Black	7 – Walsh	8 – Black	Bud Walton Arena (19,200); Fayetteville, AR
January 24, 2023; 6:00 p.m., ESPN2		LSU	W 60–40	14–6 (3–5)	16 – Davis	8 – Makhi Mitchell	3 – Tied	Bud Walton Arena (19,200); Fayetteville, AR
January 28, 2023*; 3:00 p.m., ESPN		at No. 17 Baylor; Big 12/SEC Challenge	L 64–67	14–7	25 – Council IV	9 – Graham	4 – Tied	Ferrell Center (10,627); Waco, TX
January 31, 2023; 6:00 p.m., ESPN2		Texas A&M	W 81–70	15–7 (4–5)	19 – Tied	13 – Makhel Mitchell	7 – Black	Bud Walton Arena (19,200); Fayetteville, AR
February 4, 2023; 2:30 p.m., SECN		at South Carolina	W 65–63	16–7 (5–5)	16 – Graham	10 – Walsh	4 – Black	Colonial Life Arena (11,558); Columbia, SC
February 7, 2023; 8:00 p.m., ESPN		at Kentucky	W 88–73	17–7 (6–5)	20 – Council IV	9 – Makhi Mitchell	7 – Davis	Rupp Arena (19,855); Lexington, KY
February 11, 2023; 5:00 p.m., ESPNU		Mississippi State	L 64–70	17–8 (6–6)	23 – Black	6 – Tied	5 – Black	Bud Walton Arena (19,200); Fayetteville, AR
February 15, 2023; 8:00 p.m., ESPN2		at Texas A&M	L 56–62	17–9 (6–7)	14 – Davis	9 – Makhi Mitchell	8 – Black	Reed Arena (11,315); College Station, TX
February 18, 2023; 1:00 p.m., ESPN2		Florida	W 84–65	18–9 (7–7)	26 – Graham	10 – Makhi Mitchell	3 – Black	Bud Walton Arena (19,200); Fayetteville, AR
February 21, 2023; 8:00 p.m., SECN		Georgia	W 97–65	19–9 (8–7)	26 – Smith Jr.	7 – Walsh	8 – Black	Bud Walton Arena (19,200); Fayetteville, AR
February 25, 2023; 1:00 p.m., ESPN2		at No. 2 Alabama	L 83–86	19–10 (8–8)	24 – Smith Jr.	8 – Mahkel Mitchell	2 – Tied	Coleman Coliseum (13,474); Tuscaloosa, AL
February 28, 2023; 8:00 p.m., ESPN2		at No. 12 Tennessee	L 57–75	19–11 (8–9)	13 – Tied	6 – Davis	2 – Tied	Thompson–Boling Arena (18,324); Knoxville, TN
March 4, 2023; 1:00 p.m., CBS		No. 23 Kentucky	L 79–88	19–12 (8–10)	25 – Smith Jr.	8 – Black	6 – Smith Jr.	Bud Walton Arena (19,200); Fayetteville, AR
SEC Tournament
March 9, 2023*; 6:00 p.m., SECN	(10)	vs. (7) Auburn; Second round	W 76–73	20–12	19 – Black	10 – Davis	6 – Black	Bridgestone Arena; Nashville, TN
March 10, 2023*; 6:00 p.m., SECN	(10)	vs. (2) No. 18 Texas A&M; Quarterfinals	L 61–67	20–13	16 – Smith Jr.	6 – Tied	4 – Smith Jr.	Bridgestone Arena; Nashville, TN
NCAA Tournament
March 16, 2023*; 3:30 pm, TBS	(8 W)	vs. (9 W) Illinois; First Round	W 73–63	21–13	18 – Council IV	10 – Council IV	1 – Tied	Wells Fargo Arena (16,745); Des Moines, IA
March 18, 2023*; 4:15 pm, CBS	(8 W)	vs. (1 W) No. 4 Kansas; Second Round	W 72–71	22–13	25 – Davis	10 – Johnson	4 – Council IV	Wells Fargo Arena (16,796); Des Moines, IA
March 23, 2023*; 6:15 p.m., CBS	(8 W)	vs. (4 W) No. 10 UConn; Sweet Sixteen	L 65–88	22–14	20 – Black	5 – Johnson	3 – Johnson	T-Mobile Arena (18,544); Las Vegas, NV
*Non-conference game. ^{#}Rankings from AP Poll. (#) Tournament seedings in parentheses. All times are in Central Time.
