= Central Ozark Conference =

High school athletic conference in Missouri

- Association: MSHSAA
- Sports fielded: 12
- No. of teams: 14
- Region: Southwest Missouri

The Central Ozark Conference is a high school athletic conference represented by 14 schools in the southwest portion of Missouri. All schools are in the Ozarks state region. The Central Ozark Conference offers championships for girls in Basketball, Cross Country, Golf, Soccer, Softball, Swimming & Diving, Tennis, Track & Field, Volleyball, and Wrestling. The Central Ozark Conference offers championships for boys Baseball, Basketball, Cross Country, Football, Golf, Soccer, Swimming & Diving, Tennis, Track & Field, and Wrestling.

== List of member schools ==
With the addition of the four former Ozark Conference schools for the 2024–25 school year, the conference is now split into two, seven-team divisions.

East
School	Team Name	Colors	Town	County	Enrollment (2023–24)	Primary MSHSAA Class
Central High School	(Lady) Bulldogs		Springfield	Greene	1075	5
Glendale High School	(Lady) Falcons		Springfield	Greene	1098	5
Kickapoo High School	(Lady) Chiefs		Springfield	Greene	1507	6
Lebanon High School	(Lady) Yellowjackets		Lebanon	Laclede	1136	6
Nixa High School	(Lady) Eagles		Nixa	Christian	1478	6
Ozark High School	(Lady) Tigers		Ozark	Christian	1369	6
Waynesville High School	(Lady) Tigers		Waynesville	Pulaski	1319	6

West
School	Team Name	Colors	Town	County	Enrollment (2023–24)	Primary MSHSAA Class
Carthage High School	(Lady) Tigers		Carthage	Jasper	1232	6
Joplin High School	(Lady) Eagles		Joplin	Jasper	1664	6
Parkview High School	(Lady) Vikings		Springfield	Greene	1026	5
Neosho High School	(Lady) Wildcats		Neosho	Newton	1157	6
Republic High School	(Lady) Tigers		Republic	Greene	1148	6
Webb City High School	(Lady) Cardinals		Webb City	Jasper	1011	5
Willard High School	(Lady) Tigers		Willard	Greene	1061	5

== Membership history ==
Carl Junction joined the Central Ozark Conference in July 2016 after three decades in the Big 8 Conference (Missouri).

Joplin High School joined the Central Ozarks Conference in July 2018. Joplin moved from the Ozark Conference.

The Central Ozark Conference Small division disbanded after the 2017-18 school year. The remaining schools, except Bolivar High School, will join the Big 8 Conference (Missouri). Bolivar applied to join the Ozark Conference in late December, but was rejected. They went independent for three seasons and were admitted into the Ozark Conference in July 2021 on a second attempt to join, replacing Central High School(Springfield), who went independent.

On October 11, 2023, Carl Junction and Branson announced they would be joining the new Ozark Mountain Conference for the 2024-25 school year.

Shortly after, the conference elected to send invitations to Kickapoo and Glendale which they accepted and are to start playing in the conference in the 2024-25 school year.

Because of the accepted invitations from Kickapoo and Glendale along with Hillcrest, West Plains, and Bolivar leaving for the new Ozark Mountain conference, the conference sent invitations to the remaining Ozark Conference schools, of which Central, Lebanon, Parkview, and Waynesville accepted as full members.
