= Hudgins =

Hudgins is a surname. Notable people with the surname include:

- Andrew Hudgins (born 1951), American poet
- Cathy Hudgins (1944–2025), American politician
- David Hudgins (born 1965), American television writer and producer
- Edward W. Hudgins (1882–1958), American judge
- Houlder Hudgins (Virginia) (1749-1815), Virginia emigrant, merchant, boatbuilder, planter and politician
- Jared Hudgins (born 1988), American football player and coach
- John Hudgins (born 1981), American baseball player
- Terrell Hudgins (born 1987), American football player
- Trevor Hudgins (born 1999), American basketball player
- Zack Hudgins (born 1968), American politician
