= John Allen (American football coach, Nelson) =

American football coach (born c. 1962)

Current position
- Title: Offensive line coach, outside linebackers coach
- Team: Midlothian HS (TX)

Biographical details
- Born: c. 1962 (age 63–64)
- Education: Evangel University (1986); South Dakota State University (1991); University of North Texas (2004)

Playing career
- 1981–1984: Evangel

Coaching career (HC unless noted)
- 1985–1986: Evangel (SA)
- 1987–1989: Buffalo HS (MO) (DC)
- 1990–1991: South Dakota State (GA)
- 1992–1995: Westmar (AHC/DC)
- 1996–1997: SAGU
- 1998–2000: Carpenter MS (TX)
- 2001–2005: Argyle HS (TX) (assistant)
- 2006–2014: SAGU (DC)
- 2015–2019: Life Waxahachie HS (TX)
- 2020–present: Midlothian HS (TX) (OL/OLB)

Head coaching record
- Overall: 2–9–2 (college); 25–28 (high school)

John Allen (born c. 1962) is an American high school football coach. He is the offensive line coach and outside linebackers coach for Midlothian High School, a position he has held since 2020. He was the head football coach for Southwestern Assemblies of God University from 1996 to 1997 and Life School Waxahachie from 2015 to 2019. He also was an assistant coach for Evangel, Buffalo High School, South Dakota State, Westmar, Carpenter Middle School, and Argyle High School. He played college football for Evangel.

== Head coaching record ==
=== College ===
Year	Team	Overall	Conference	Standing	Bowl/playoffs
SAGU Lions (National Christian College Athletic Association) (1996–1997)
1996	SAGU	1–3–1			
1997	SAGU	1–6–1			
SAGU:		2–9–2			
Total:		2–9–2			

=== High school ===
Year	Team	Overall	Conference	Standing	Bowl/playoffs
Life Waxahachie Mustangs () (2015–2019)
2015	Life Waxahachie	6–4	1–4	5th	
2016	Life Waxahachie	2–9	2–3	4th	
2017	Life Waxahachie	5–6	3–2	3rd	
2018	Life Waxahachie	5–5	2–3	4th	
2019	Life Waxahachie	7–4	3–2	3rd	
Life Waxahachie:		25–28	11–14		
Total:		25–28			
