= Pershing Middle School =

Pershing Middle School may refer to:

- Pershing Middle School (Houston)
- Pershing Middle School (San Diego) - San Diego Unified School District
- Pershing Middle School (Springfield, Missouri) - Springfield Public Schools
