= Trevon Brazile =

American basketball player (born 2003)

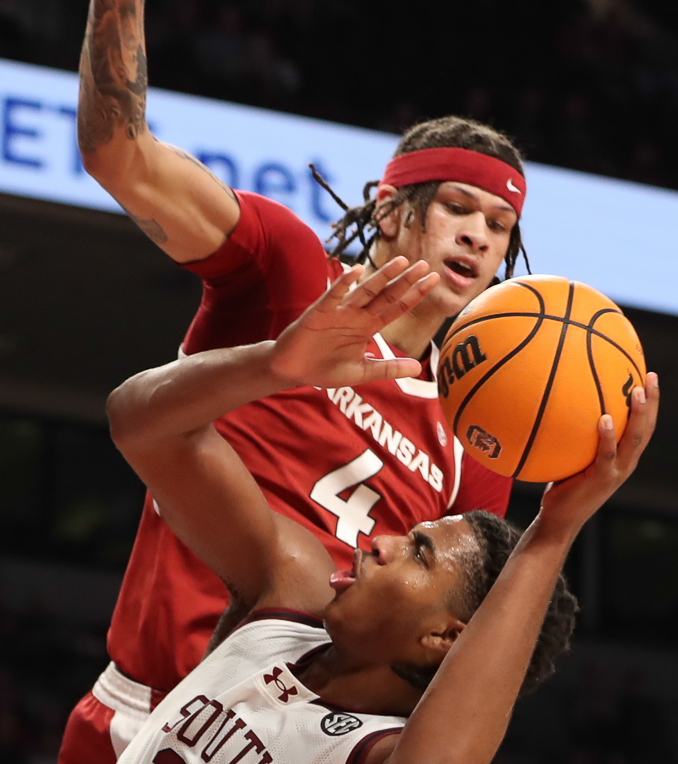
- Brazile (on top) in 2025

No. 7 – Denver Nuggets
- Position: Power forward
- League: NBA

Personal information
- Born: January 7, 2003 (age 23) Springfield, Missouri, U.S.
- Listed height: 6 ft 10 in (2.08 m)
- Listed weight: 220 lb (100 kg)

Career information
- High school: Parkview (Springfield, Missouri); Kickapoo (Springfield, Missouri)
- College: Missouri (2021–2022); Arkansas (2022–2026)
- NBA draft: 2026: 2nd round, 35th overall pick
- Drafted by: San Antonio Spurs
- Playing career: 2026–present

Career history
- 2026–present: Denver Nuggets
- Stats at NBA.com
- Stats at Basketball Reference

Trevon Mykel Brazile (born January 7, 2003) is an American basketball player for the Denver Nuggets of the National Basketball Association (NBA). He played college basketball for the Missouri Tigers and Arkansas Razorbacks.

== Early life and high school career ==
Brazile was born in Springfield, Missouri. He grew up playing basketball and usually was a point guard. He first attended Parkview High School in Springfield, where he played basketball and averaged 11.2 points and 5.1 rebounds per game as a junior, before transferring to Kickapoo High School as a senior. At Kickapoo, Brazile helped them win a state championship and was named all-state and first-team all-conference while averaging 13.2 points and 7.5 rebounds per game. Ranked a three-star recruit, the fourth-best recruit in the state and the 178th-best nationally by 247Sports, he committed to playing college basketball for Missouri.

== College career ==
Brazile joined Missouri for the 2021–22 season but missed the first eight games with a medical condition, then played in two games as a backup and started the final 22 games. He led the team with 43 blocks, placing fourth all-time for freshmen in school history, and averaged 6.6 points and 5.1 rebounds per game. After head coach Cuonzo Martin was dismissed by the Tigers, Brazile entered the NCAA transfer portal. He ultimately transferred to Arkansas.

As a sophomore at Arkansas in 2022–23, Brazile appeared in the first nine games before suffering a torn ACL. He averaged 11.8 points and six rebounds per game and made 38% of his shots from the 3-point range. He was considered a potential second-round selection in the 2023 NBA draft despite his injury but opted to return for another season. Entering the 2023–24 season, Brazile was selected preseason first-team All-Southeastern Conference (SEC), one of the 50 watch listed players for the Naismith College Player of the Year and one of 20 watch listed players for the Karl Malone Award.

On April 8, 2024, Brazile declared for the 2024 NBA draft.

On June 4, 2024, Brazile announced he would be withdrawing from the transfer portal and return to Arkansas.

== Professional career ==
On June 24, 2026, Brazile was drafted 35th overall by the San Antonio Spurs in the 2026 NBA Draft then was immediately traded to the Denver Nuggets with two second-round picks for Tarris Reed Jr. He is the first player from Springfield, Missouri, to be drafted since Greg Cavener in 1985.

== Career statistics ==
Legend
GP	Games played	GS	Games started	MPG	Minutes per game
FG%	Field goal percentage	3P%	3-point field goal percentage	FT%	Free throw percentage
RPG	Rebounds per game	APG	Assists per game	SPG	Steals per game
BPG	Blocks per game	PPG	Points per game	**Bold**	Career high

=== College ===
Year	Team	GP	GS	MPG	FG%	3P%	FT%	RPG	APG	SPG	BPG	PPG
2021–22	Missouri	25	**23**	21.5	.534	.333	.620	5.1	.8	.5	**1.9**	6.6
2022–23	Arkansas	9	0	27.0	.481	.379	.677	6.0	1.0	1.0	1.2	11.8
2023–24	Arkansas	26	**23**	25.7	.488	.353	.695	5.9	.5	.7	1.2	8.6
2024–25	Arkansas	**34**	13	20.9	**.600**	.364	.529	5.4	.7	.8	1.1	6.8
2025–26	Arkansas	19	18	**28.1**	.545	**.404**	**.742**	**6.8**	**1.2**	**1.7**	1.2	**12.6**
Career		113	77	23.8	.534	.368	.658	5.7	.8	.8	1.3	8.5
