= Lutheran High School (Colorado) =

Lutheran high school in Colorado, US

Location
- 11249 Newlin Gulch Blvd; Parker, Colorado 80134; United States; 39°30′45″N 104°48′29″W

Information
- Former name: Lutheran High School Parker; Denver Lutheran
- Type: Private high school
- Religious affiliation: Lutheranism
- Denomination: Lutheran Church–Missouri Synod
- Established: 1955 (Denver Lutheran); 2004 (current campus); 2011 (consolidation)
- CEEB code: 060417
- Principal: David Ness
- Grades: 9-12
- Enrollment: 600 (2019)
- Colors: Purple and silver
- Athletics: CHSAA 4A
- Athletics conference: Metro League
- Mascot: Lion
- Accreditation: National Lutheran School Association
- Website: www.lhsparker.org

Lutheran High School is a private Lutheran high school located in Parker, Colorado, in the United States. Affiliated with the Lutheran Church–Missouri Synod, the school is accredited by the National Lutheran School Association and has an average class size of 25 students. The executive director of the school is Dan Gehrke.

== History ==
In 1955, Lutheran High School opened on West Arizona Avenue in Denver, Colorado. Only temporary buildings, including a little white house, served as the classrooms and school library. Total enrollment the first year was 77 students - 49 freshmen and 28 sophomores. Students voted to have navy blue and gold as the school colors and The Lights as the mascot. In 2000, the school decided to expand to two additional campuses - Lutheran High School of the Rockies (later renamed Lutheran High School Parker) and North Lutheran High School. Lutheran High was renamed Denver Lutheran because of the additional campuses.

Lutheran High School Parker opened in 2000 in a strip mall on Parker Road. In 2004, construction for Lutheran High School Parker started at its current location on Newlin Gulch. Construction was completed in 2008. Enrollment goals for each campus could not be met for several years, resulting in North Lutheran High closing in 2006. The lack of success also resulted in Denver Lutheran closing its doors in 2011 and being consolidated Lutheran High School Parker, with the consolidated school being named Lutheran High School. Lutheran High School is now the only Lutheran high school in the Denver metro area. As of 2025, enrollment was around 1100.

== Allegations of misconduct at football games ==
In October 2021, Denver7 reported allegations that players of the Lutheran High School football team used racial slurs and derogatory comments toward minority players on Evergreen High School's team during a football game. Further allegations were made about Lutheran High School players mocking their rivals in regard to their recently deceased assistant coach, Tom Poholsky. Jeffco Public Schools responded that complaints regarding player conduct were being investigated.

In October 2026, KRDO reported allegations that Lutheran High School students directed racial slurs and harassment at Sand Creek High School players, cheerleaders, and student staff during a September 24 football game hosted by Lutheran. Lutheran's executive director, Dan Gerhke, stated that the school was investigating the incident.

In October 2026, KOAA reported accusations of racist comments during football games involving Lutheran High School and Sand Creek and Rampart high schools. A Sand Creek parent alleged that Black cheerleaders were subject to racial slurs. District 49 said it had raised concerns with Lutheran and the Colorado High School Athletic Association (CHSAA), while District 20 said Rampart administrators had investigated reports and shared their findings with Lutheran. Lutheran said it was investigating the allegations, and CHSAA said it was gathering information.

== Athletics - state championships ==
The school has won the following state championships:

- Cross Country – 1975
- Girls Basketball - 1985, 1996, 1998, 2014, 2016
- Boys Basketball – 1985, 1986, 2011, 2021
- Boys Track - 1989, 2014, 2015, 2016, 2017, 2019, 2022, 2023
- Poms – 2010
- Volleyball - 2011, 2012, 2018
- Girls Softball - 2021, 2022, 2023

== Notable alumni ==
- Baye Fall - basketball player
- Jon Scott (Class of 1976) - Fox News anchor (Fox & Friends)
