= Battlefield, Missouri =

- City
- City of Battlefield
- Location of Battlefield, Missouri
- Coordinates: 37°06′56″N 93°22′13″W
- Country: United States
- State: Missouri
- County: Greene

Area
  - Total: 2.56 sq mi (6.63 km^{2})
  - Land: 2.56 sq mi (6.63 km^{2})
  - Water: 0 sq mi (0.00 km^{2})
- Elevation: 1,273 ft (388 m)

Population (2020)
  - Total: 5,990
  - Density: 2,339/sq mi (903.2/km^{2})
- Time zone: UTC-6 (Central (CST))
  - Summer (DST): UTC-5 (CDT)
- ZIP code: 65619
- Area code: 417
- FIPS code: 29-03592
- Website: battlefieldmo.gov

Battlefield is a city in Greene County, Missouri, United States. As of the 2020 census, the city's population was 5,990. It is part of the Springfield, Missouri Metropolitan Statistical Area. The town has no post office and shares the ZIP code (65619) with Brookline.

== History ==
A post office called Battlefield was established in 1908, and remained in operation until 1940. Battlefield is named for its proximity to the 1861 Battle of Wilson's Creek, one of the first large battles of the American Civil War.

== Geography ==
The community is located in southern Greene County, 1.5 miles (2.4 km) north of the Greene - Christian county line. Missouri Route FF passes through the community. Wilsons Creek and Wilson's Creek National Battlefield are two miles west of the townsite.

According to the United States Census Bureau, the city has a total area of 2.50 square miles (6.47 km^{2}), all land.

== Demographics ==
Historical population
| Census | Pop. | Note | %± |
|---|---|---|---|
| 1980 | 1,227 | | — |
| 1990 | 1,526 | | 24.4% |
| 2000 | 2,385 | | 56.3% |
| 2010 | 5,590 | | 134.4% |
| 2020 | 5,990 | | 7.2% |
U.S. Decennial Census

=== 2020 census ===
As of the 2020 census, Battlefield had a population of 5,990. The median age was 38.6 years. 25.2% of residents were under the age of 18 and 15.2% of residents were 65 years of age or older. For every 100 females there were 96.1 males, and for every 100 females age 18 and over there were 94.4 males age 18 and over.

99.0% of residents lived in urban areas, while 1.0% lived in rural areas.

There were 2,286 households in Battlefield, of which 37.0% had children under the age of 18 living in them. Of all households, 61.2% were married-couple households, 13.3% were households with a male householder and no spouse or partner present, and 19.7% were households with a female householder and no spouse or partner present. About 18.7% of all households were made up of individuals and 7.3% had someone living alone who was 65 years of age or older.

There were 2,360 housing units, of which 3.1% were vacant. The homeowner vacancy rate was 0.8% and the rental vacancy rate was 4.6%.

Racial composition as of the 2020 census
| Race | Number | Percent |
|---|---|---|
| White | 5,162 | 86.2% |
| Black or African American | 101 | 1.7% |
| American Indian and Alaska Native | 41 | 0.7% |
| Asian | 123 | 2.1% |
| Native Hawaiian and Other Pacific Islander | 10 | 0.2% |
| Some other race | 59 | 1.0% |
| Two or more races | 494 | 8.2% |
| Hispanic or Latino (of any race) | 228 | 3.8% |

=== 2010 census ===
As of the census of 2010, there were 5,590 people, 2,125 households, and 1,593 families living in the city. The population density was 2,236.0 inhabitants per square mile (863.3/km^{2}). There were 2,210 housing units at an average density of 884.0 per square mile (341.3/km^{2}). The racial makeup of the city was 92.8% White, 1.5% African American, 0.5% Native American, 2.1% Asian, 0.7% from other races, and 2.4% from two or more races. Hispanic or Latino of any race were 2.7% of the population.

There were 2,125 households, of which 40.6% had children under the age of 18 living with them, 62.3% were married couples living together, 9.0% had a female householder with no husband present, 3.6% had a male householder with no wife present, and 25.0% were non-families. 20.4% of all households were made up of individuals, and 4% had someone living alone who was 65 years of age or older. The average household size was 2.63 and the average family size was 3.05.

The median age in the city was 33.8 years. 29.2% of residents were under the age of 18; 5.7% were between the ages of 18 and 24; 33.7% were from 25 to 44; 22.6% were from 45 to 64; and 8.7% were 65 years of age or older. The gender makeup of the city was 48.6% male and 51.4% female.

=== 2000 census ===
As of the census of 2000, there were 2,385 people, 857 households, and 719 families living in the city. The population density was 1,202.4 inhabitants per square mile (464.2/km^{2}). There were 885 housing units at an average density of 446.2 per square mile (172.3/km^{2}). The racial makeup of the city was 97.11% White, 0.17% African American, 0.34% Native American, 0.75% Asian, 0.04% Pacific Islander, 0.46% from other races, and 1.13% from two or more races. Hispanic or Latino of any race were 1.22% of the population.

There were 857 households, out of which 44.7% had children under the age of 18 living with them, 72.0% were married couples living together, 8.8% had a female householder with no husband present, and 16.1% were non-families. 12.4% of all households were made up of individuals, and 2.9% had someone living alone who was 65 years of age or older. The average household size was 2.78 and the average family size was 3.01.

In the city, the population was spread out, with 29.6% under the age of 18, 8.1% from 18 to 24, 35.7% from 25 to 44, 21.3% from 45 to 64, and 5.3% who were 65 years of age or older. The median age was 32 years. For every 100 females, there were 98.1 males. For every 100 females age 18 and over, there were 96.4 males.

The median income for a household in the city was $47,788, and the median income for a family was $51,204. Males had a median income of $32,297 versus $26,028 for females. The per capita income for the city was $20,656. About 1.5% of families and 2.4% of the population were below the poverty line, including 3.9% of those under age 18 and none of those age 65 or over.

== Education ==
The city is divided between the Springfield R-XII School District and the Republic R-III School District.
