= Rolla High School =

Public school in Rolla, Missouri, United States

Location
- 900 Bulldog Run; Rolla, Missouri 65401; United States; 37.9506°N 91.7663°W

Information
- School type: Public
- Established: 1921
- Principal: Corey Ray
- Teaching staff: 72.57 (on an FTE basis)
- Grades: 9–12
- Enrollment: 1,398 (2024-2025)
- Student to teacher ratio: 19.26
- Colors: Maroon and Silver
- Athletics conference: Ozark Conference
- Nickname: Bulldogs
- Newspaper: The Echo
- Yearbook: The Growler
- Website: rhs.rolla31.org

Rolla Senior High School is a public secondary school located in Rolla, Missouri, United States. The school's mascot is the Bulldog with the colors of maroon and silver (formerly maroon, gray, and gold).

== History ==
Among the high school's predecessor buildings was the Rolla Building that opened in 1871. It was shared with the Missouri School of Mines and Metallurgy in its first year of existence. The college bought the building for $25,000 in 1875 and it remains in use as the school's mathematics library after being extensively renovated.

The present school dates to 1921. In 1989 an addition was made to the high school which nearly doubled its classrooms. Another addition was constructed during the 2016–17 school year to accommodate the mathematics department. For the most part the hard sciences remain in the older portions of the building and other subjects are dispersed in between halls.

The high school started the 2008–2009 year with a new principal, Mr. Nathan Hoven, after the previous principal Dr. Roger Berkbuegler retired after 28 years as the principal of Rolla Senior High School. The current principal is Dr. Corey Ray.

== Athletics ==
Rolla High School's Bulldog Athletic teams compete year-round.

- Boys' golf has claimed two state championships in 1977 and 1982
- Fall sports
  - Boys Cross Country
  - Boys Soccer
  - Boys Football
  - Girls Cross Country
  - Girls Volleyball
  - Girls Golf
  - Girls Softball
  - Girls Tennis
  - Girls Football Cheerleading
  - Marching Band (including Color Guard)
- Winter sports
  - Boys Wrestling
  - Girls Wrestling
  - Boys Basketball
  - Girls Basketball
  - Girls Winter Cheerleading sports
- Spring Sports
  - Boys Baseball
  - Boys Tennis
  - Boys Golf
  - Boys Track and Field
  - Girls Track and Field
  - Girls Soccer
  - Winter Guard

== Notable alumni ==
- Robin Carnahan, former Administrator of General Services, former Missouri Secretary of State
- Russ Carnahan, Chair of the Missouri Democratic Party, former member of the U.S. House of Representatives from Missouri's 3rd district
- Chantae McMillan, heptathlete who competed at the 2012 Summer Olympics
