= Jack Israel =

American basketball player

Personal information
- Born: April 3, 1934 Springfield, Missouri
- Died: September 17, 2017 (aged 83) Sun City West, Arizona

Career information
- High school: Central (Springfield, Missouri)
- College: Missouri (1951–1952); Missouri State (1957–1959)
- NBA draft: 1959: 14th round, 83rd overall pick
- Drafted by: New York Knicks

Career highlights
- Missouri State Hall of Fame (1979)
- Stats at Basketball Reference

Jack Weldon Israel (April 3, 1934 – September 17, 2017) was an American basketball player who was drafted by the New York Knicks in the 14th round of the 1959 NBA draft from Southwest Missouri State University. He attended the University of Missouri for his freshman year (1951–52) before joining the Navy, where he played on the All-Navy basketball team. After his military commitment, he returned to Springfield, Missouri and finished his college basketball career at Missouri State.

He completed his master of science at the University of Illinois and his doctorate at University of California, Los Angeles.

In his post-basketball career he became a teacher, coach, counselor, assistant principal, principal, assistant superintendent, superintendent, and college professor.
