= Nelson Lions football =

College football team

- First season: 1996; 30 years ago
- Athletic director: Jesse Godding
- Head coach: Jared Hudgins; 2nd season, 6–14 (.300)
- Location: Waxahachie, Texas
- Stadium: Lumpkins Stadium (capacity: 9,500)
- Conference: SAC
- Colors: Royal purple and mane gold
- All-time record: 105–184–2 (.364)
- Mascot: Judah the Lion
- Website: nelsonlions.com

The Nelson Lions football team represents Nelson University (formerly Southwestern Assemblies of God University) in college football in the National Association of Intercollegiate Athletics (NAIA). The Lions are members of the Sooner Athletic Conference (SAC), fielding its team in the GPAC since 2013. The Lions play their home games at Lumpkins Stadium in Waxahachie, Texas.

Their head coach is Jared Hudgins, who took over the position for the 2024 season.

== Conference affiliations ==
- NCCAA independent (1996–1997)
- NAIA independent (1998–1999, 2005–2007, 2012)
- Central States Football League (2000–2004, 2008–2017)
- Sooner Athletic Conference (2018–present)

== List of head coaches ==
=== Key ===
Key to symbols in coaches list
General		Overall		Conference		Postseason (Note: Although the first Rose Bowl Game was played in 1902, it has been continuously played since the 1916 game, and is recognized as the oldest bowl game by the NCAA. "—" indicates any season prior to 1916 when postseason games were not played.)	
No.	Order of coaches (Note: A running total of the number of head coaches, with coaches who served separate tenures being counted only once. Interim head coaches are represented with "Int" and are not counted in the running total. "—" indicates the team played but either without a coach or no coach is on record. "X" indicates an interim year without play.)	GC	Games coached	CW	Conference wins	PW	Postseason wins
DC	Division championships	OW	Overall wins	CL	Conference losses	PL	Postseason losses
CC	Conference championships	OL	Overall losses	CT	Conference ties	PT	Postseason ties
NC	National championships	OT	Overall ties (Note: Overtime rules in college football were introduced in 1996, making ties impossible in the period since.)	C%	Conference winning percentage		
†	Elected to the College Football Hall of Fame	O%	Overall winning percentage (Note: When computing the win–loss percentage, a tie counts as half a win and half a loss.)				

=== Coaches ===
List of head football coaches showing season(s) coached, overall records and conference records
No.	Name	Season(s)	GC	OW	OL	OT	O%	CW	CL	CT	C%
1	John Allen	1996–1997	13	2	9	2	0.231	—	—	—	–
2	Tommy Sugg	1998	10	2	8	0	0.200	—	—	—	–
3	Paul Burgard	1999	10	1	9	0	0.100	—	—	—	–
4	Tim Truman	2000–2001	20	3	17	0	0.150	1	8	0	0.111
5	Jesse Godding	2002–2014	137	43	94	0	0.314	12	24	0	0.333
6	Frank Tristan	2015–2017	32	20	12	0	0.625	13	7	0	0.650
7	Ryan Smith	2018–2021	37	18	19	0	0.486	13	19	0	0.406
8	Greg Ellis	2022–2023	22	13	9	0	0.591	10	8	0	0.556
8	Jared Hudgins	2024–present	10	3	7	0	0.300	1	7	0	0.125

== Year-by-year results ==
National champions	Conference champions	Bowl game berth	Playoff berth

Season	Year	Head coach	Association	Division	Conference	Record							Postseason	Final ranking
Season	Year	Head coach	Association	Division	Conference	Overall			Conference				Postseason	Final ranking
Season	Year	Head coach	Association	Division	Conference	Win	Loss	Tie	Finish	Win	Loss	Tie	Postseason	Final ranking
SAGU Lions
1996	1996	John Allen	NCCAA	—	Independent	1	3	1					—	—
1997	1997	John Allen	NCCAA	—	Independent	1	6	0					—	—
1998	1998	Tommy Sugg	NAIA	—	Independent	2	8	0					—	—
1999	1999	Paul Burgard	NAIA	—	Independent	1	9	0					—	—
2000	2000	Tim Truman	NAIA	—	CSFL	2	8	0	6th	0	5	0	—	—
2001	2001	Tim Truman	NAIA	—	CSFL	1	9	0	4th	1	3	0	—	—
2002	2002	Jesse Godding	NAIA	—	CSFL	0	9	0	N/A				—	—
2003	2003	Jesse Godding	NAIA	—	CSFL	2	8	0	T–5th	1	4	0	—	—
2004	2004	Jesse Godding	NAIA	—	CSFL	1	10	0	7th	0	6	0	—	—
2005	2005	Jesse Godding	NAIA	—	Independent	2	8	0					—	—
2006	2006	Jesse Godding	NAIA	—	Independent	2	8	0					—	—
2007	2007	Jesse Godding	NAIA	—	Independent	1	9	0					—	—
2008	2008	Jesse Godding	NAIA	—	Independent	4	5	0					—	—
2009	2009	Jesse Godding	NAIA	—	CSFL	3	7	0	4th	2	3	0	—	—
2010	2010	Jesse Godding	NAIA	—	CSFL	2	8	0	7th	0	5	0	—	—
2011	2011	Jesse Godding	NAIA	—	CSFL	4	6	0	5th	1	4	0	—	—
2012	2012	Jesse Godding	NAIA	—	Independent	4	6	0					—	—
2013	2013	Jesse Godding	NAIA	—	CSFL	6	4	0	2nd	4	1	0	—	—
2014	2014	Jesse Godding	NAIA	—	CSFL	4	6	0	2nd	4	1	0	—	—
2015	2015	Frank Tristan	NAIA	—	CSFL	8	3	0	3rd	4	2	0	Won 2015 Victory Bowl	—
2016	2016	Frank Tristan	NAIA	—	CSFL	4	6	0	T–4th	2	4	0	—	—
2017	2017	Frank Tristan	NAIA	—	CSFL	8	3	0	2nd	7	1	0	Lost 2017 Victory Bowl	19
2018	2018	Ryan Smith	NAIA	—	SAC	5	5	0	5th	4	4	0	—	—
2019	2019	Ryan Smith	NAIA	—	SAC	0	8	0	9th	0	10	0	—	—
2020	2019	Ryan Smith	NAIA	—	SAC	4	3	0	3rd	3	2	0	—	—
2021	2021	Ryan Smith	NAIA	—	SAC	9	3	0	T–4th	6	3	0	Won 2021 Victory Bowl	—
2022	2022	Greg Ellis	NAIA	—	SAC	7	3	0	T–4th	6	3	0	Lost 2022 Victory Bowl	—
2023	2023	Greg Ellis	NAIA	—	SAC	4	6	0	6th	4	5	0	—	—
Nelson Lions
2024	2024	Jared Hudgins	NAIA	—	SAC	3	7	0	9th	1	7	0	—	—
