= The Memory Project =

U.S. nonprofit organization

Memory Project
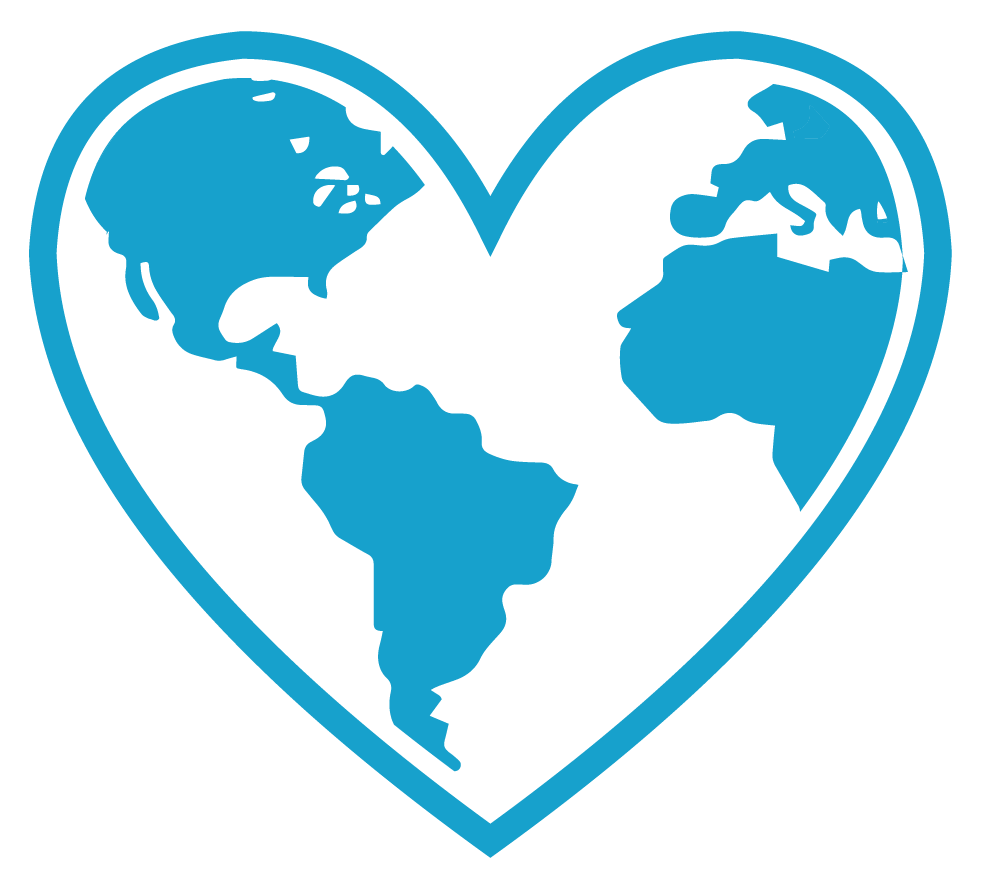
- Founded: 2004
- Type: Non-profit corporation
- Purpose: Youth
- Location: Middleton, Wisconsin, U.S.
- Region served: Global
- Method: Portraiture
- Website: www.memoryproject.org

Memory Project is a nonprofit organization that invites art teachers and their students to create portraits for youth around the world who have faced substantial challenges, such as neglect, abuse, loss of parents, violence, war, and extreme poverty.

The intent of the portraits is to help the children feel valued and important, to know that many people care about their well-being, and to act as meaningful pieces of personal history in the future. For art students who participate, the project is intended to be an opportunity to creatively practice kindness and global awareness.

To do this, the Memory Project receives photos of children and teens from global charities operating residential homes, schools, and care centers in a number of different countries every year. The Memory Project then assigns those children's photos to professional art teachers. The art teachers then work with their students to create the portraits, and the Memory Project delivers the portraits to the children meant to receive them.

For art novice art students who do not have experience creating portraits, the Memory Project provides an option to create "identity art" focusing on the children's names and three positive words they choose to describe themselves.

The Memory Project was active in Afghanistan until the Taliban returned to power in August 2021.

The Memory Project also focused on Ukrainian children in 2022.
