= Baye Fall (basketball) =

Senegalese basketball player (born 2003)

Fresno State Bulldogs
- Position: Center
- Conference: Pac-12 Conference

Personal information
- Born: December 21, 2003 (age 22) Dakar, Senegal
- Listed height: 6 ft 11 in (2.11 m)
- Listed weight: 205 lb (93 kg)

Career information
- High school: Lutheran (Parker, Colorado); Denver Prep (Denver, Colorado); Accelerated Prep (Denver, Colorado)
- College: Arkansas (2023–2024); Kansas State (2024–2025); Rutgers (2025–2026); Fresno State (2026–present)

Career highlights
- McDonald's All-American (2023); Nike Hoop Summit (2023)

Baye Modou Fall (born December 21, 2003) is a Senegalese college basketball player for the Fresno State Bulldogs of the Pac-12 Conference. He previously played for the Arkansas Razorbacks, Kansas State Wildcats, and Rutgers Scarlet Knights.

== Early life ==
Fall grew up in the Senegalese capital of Dakar, mainly playing association football as a goalkeeper. He was always tall for his age, with his father standing at 6 feet 8 inches (2.03 m) and his mother at 6 feet 4 inches (1.93 m). His older brother and uncle encouraged him to focus full-time on basketball at the age of 13, when they noticed he had potential on the court. When he was 15, Fall moved to the United States to join his cousin, Mamadou Sow, and their uncle in Denver, enrolling at Lincoln Academy Charter School to finish the eighth grade. The main reason for the move was an opportunity for a better education, with Fall hoping to be an architect. Unlike Sow, he already knew some English, though they both used social media and rap music to learn casual English and slang.

In March 2019, Fall made a strong first impression on scouts with a standout performance at the Pangos Junior All-American Camp, a showcase for the top middle school talent in the country. Basketball writer Frank Burlison, a member of the USBWA Hall of Fame, compared his dominance to that of Deandre Ayton's at the same event six years prior.

== High school career ==
Fall followed his cousin and enrolled at Lutheran High School in Parker, Colorado. He averaged 19 points, 10.5 rebounds and 3.8 blocks per game while shooting 67 percent from the field as a freshman, leading his school to an appearance in the class 3A state quarterfinals. He earned second-team class 3A all-state and second-team MaxPreps Freshman All-American honors.

As a sophomore, Fall averaged 22.1 points, 10 rebounds, and 3.2 blocks per game, guiding Lutheran to a 16–1 record and a class 3A state title. He recorded 10 points, 11 rebounds, and six blocks in the championship game against St. Mary's. At the end of they year he was named class 3A state player of the year, MaxPreps Colorado Player of the Year, and a first-team MaxPreps Sophomore All-American. That summer he shared co-MVP honors with JJ Taylor at the 2021 Pangos All-American Camp Top30 game in Las Vegas.

Ahead of his junior season, Fall announced he was transferring to the newly-formed Denver Prep Academy, a member of the Grind Session national prep basketball league. However, after appearing in just ten games, he was dismissed from the team in February 2022 for a violation of team rules. He averaged 14.3 points, 7.1 rebounds and 1.6 blocks per game at the time of his dismissal. That summer, Fall averaged 18 points, 10 rebounds and three blocks a game for the Colorado Hawks in the Adidas 3SSB circuit. He was named co-MVP of the Pangos All-American Camp Top 30 All-Star Game in June, followed by a performance as the top scorer and rebounder at the NBAPA Top 100 Camp in July.

For his senior year, Fall enrolled at Accelerated Prep, another Denver-based private school competing in the Grind Session league as a new member. On January 24, 2023, Fall was selected as a McDonald's All-American.

=== Recruiting ===
Fall was a consensus four-star recruit and one of the top players in the 2023 class, according to major recruiting services. He received his first offer from Minnesota when he was still in the eighth grade. By the end of his freshman season at Lutheran he also held offers from Georgia, Georgetown and Kansas. In August 2022, Fall announced that he had trimmed his list of schools to seven: Arkansas, Auburn, Colorado, Kansas State, Rutgers, Seton Hall and Texas. He had received more than 30 offers at this point. On November 15, 2022, Fall committed to playing college basketball for Arkansas.

College recruiting
Name	Hometown	School	Height	Weight	Commit date
Baye Fall; C	Dakar, Senegal	Accelerated Prep (CO)	6 ft 10 in (2.08 m)	200 lb (91 kg)	Nov 15, 2022
Baye Fall; C	Recruit ratings: Rivals: 247Sports: ESPN: (88)				
Overall recruit ranking: Rivals: 36 247Sports: 29 ESPN: 29
Note: In many cases, Scout, Rivals, 247Sports, On3, and ESPN may conflict in their listings of height and weight.; In these cases, the average was taken. ESPN grades are on a 100-point scale.; Sources: "Arkansas 2023 Basketball Commitments". Rivals.; "2023 Arkansas Razorbacks Recruiting Class". ESPN.; "2023 Team Ranking". Rivals.

== College career ==
Fall played limited minutes in nine games during his freshman season at Arkansas. Following the departure of coach Eric Musselman, he entered the transfer portal, ultimately joining Kansas State. Fall averaged 2.5 points and 1.5 rebounds in four games for the Wildcats as a sophomore in 2024–25 and entered the transfer portal on April 14, 2025. He ultimately transferred to Rutgers.

== Career statistics ==
Legend
GP	Games played	GS	Games started	MPG	Minutes per game
FG%	Field goal percentage	3P%	3-point field goal percentage	FT%	Free throw percentage
RPG	Rebounds per game	APG	Assists per game	SPG	Steals per game
BPG	Blocks per game	PPG	Points per game	**Bold**	Career high

=== College ===
Year	Team	GP	GS	MPG	FG%	3P%	FT%	RPG	APG	SPG	BPG	PPG
2023–24	Arkansas	**9**	0	5.0	.500	—	.333	1.3	.0	**.3**	.7	.8
2024–25	Kansas State	4	0	**6.3**	**.625**	—	—	1.5	.0	.0	**.8**	**2.5**
2025–26	Rutgers	**9**	0	5.0	.333	—	**.500**	**1.7**	**.1**	.1	.3	.6
Career		22	0	5.4	.486	—	.277	1.5	.1	.1	.6	1.3
