= Springfield Public Schools (Missouri) =

School district in Missouri, U.S.

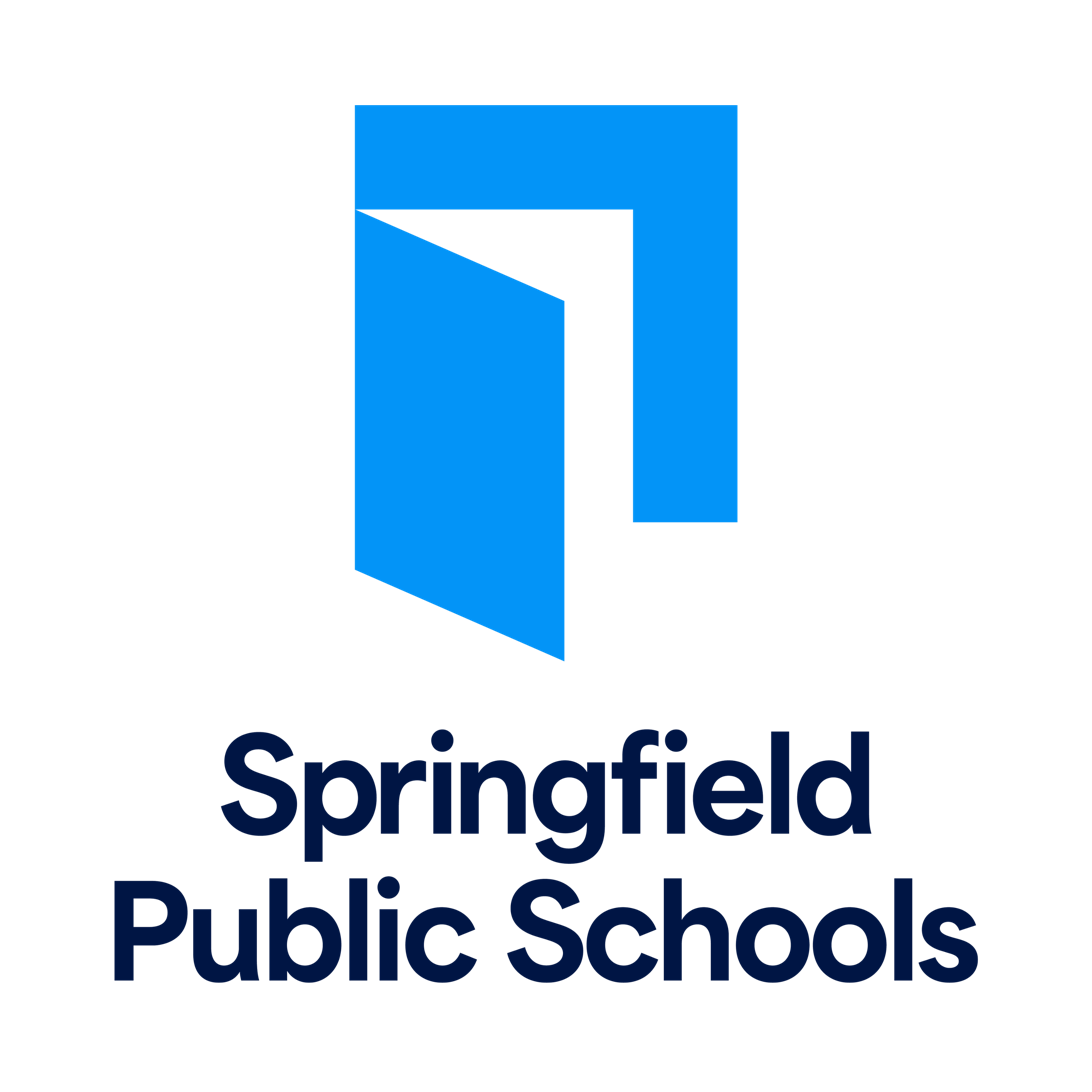

Location
- 1359 E. St. Louis Street Springfield, Missouri, 65802

District information
- Type: Public
- Grades: Pre K-12
- Superintendent: Dr. Grenita Lathan
- Schools: 50

Students and staff
- Students: 24,309 (2020)
- Staff: 3,500

Other information
- Website: www.sps.org

Springfield Public Schools (SPS), also known as the Springfield R-12 School District, is a public school district headquartered in Springfield, Missouri, United States. With an official fall 2020 enrollment of 24,309 students attending 35 elementary schools, one intermediate schools, nine middle schools and five high schools, it is the largest public school district in the state of Missouri. Public high schools located in Springfield include Central High School, Kickapoo High School, Hillcrest High School, Parkview High School, and Glendale High School.

The district includes the majority of the Springfield city limits and a portion of Battlefield.

== History ==
It was established in 1868. In 2018, as part of a plan to sell a bond issue to parents, the district hired architects to develop plans for new schools to show to parents. In 2018, twelve of the district's schools had "secure vestibules" controlling entry, and the district was making efforts to establish more.

== Accomplishments ==
- SPS 4-year graduation rate for 2020 was 93.6%.
- SPS has the state's only K-12 International Baccalaureate program.
- The Springfield community has recently invested more than $168 million to improve its education facilities.
- They average teaching experience of their teachers about 12.1 years, and more than 62.9% of teachers have advanced degrees.

== Schools ==
Springfield Schools
| School name | Type |
|---|---|
| Central | High |
| Hillcrest | High |
| Glendale | High |
| Kickapoo | High |
| Parkview | High |
| Carver | Middle |
| Cherokee | Middle |
| Jarrett | Middle |
| Pipkin | Middle |
| Reed | Middle |
| Hickory Hills | K-8 |
| Pershing | K-8 |
| Pleasant View | K-8 |
| Westport | K-8 |
| Wilson's Creek | Intermediate |
| Bingham | Elementary |
| Bissett | Elementary |
| Bowerman | Elementary |
| Boyd | Elementary |
| Cowden | Elementary |
| Delaware | Elementary |
| Disney | Elementary |
| Field | Elementary |
| Fremont | Elementary |
| Gray | Elementary |
| Harrison | Elementary |
| Holland | Elementary |
| Jeffries | Elementary |
| Mann | Elementary |
| McBride | Elementary |
| McGregor | Elementary |
| Pittman | Elementary |
| Robberson | Elementary |
| Rountree | Elementary |
| Sequiota | Elementary |
| Sherwood | Elementary |
| Sunshine | Elementary |
| Truman | Elementary |
| Twain | Elementary |
| Watkins | Elementary |
| Weaver | Elementary |
| Weller | Elementary |
| Wilder | Elementary |
| Williams | Elementary |
| York | Elementary |
| Campbell | Early Childhood Center |
| Fulbright | Early Childhood Center |
| Mallory | Early Childhood Center |
| Shady Dell | Early Childhood Center |

== Demographics ==
The school district has seen a rise in the number of non white students in the past twenty years, in 2000 white enrollment was 90.8%, since that time it has dropped to 75.3%, the number of black and Asian students has doubled, and Latino students have more than tripled.

District Demographics (2019)
| Race/Ethnicity | Percentage |
|---|---|
| White | 75.3 |
| Black/African American | 7.9 |
| Hispanic/Latino | 6.8 |
| Asian | 3.2 |
| Multirace | 5.7 |
| Native American/Pacific Islander | Approx. 1 |

== Superintendent ==
District Superintendents
| Name | Start date | End date |
|---|---|---|
| Willard Graff | 1952 | 1970 |
| Joe Kuklenski | 1970 | 1981 |
| Paul Hagerty | 1981 | 1992 |
| Bud Greve (CEO)/ Conley Weiss(COO) | 1993 | 1996 |
| Bud Greve | 1996 | 1999 |
| Jack Ernst | 1999 | 2005 |
| Norm Ridder | 2005 | 2014 |
| John Jungmann | 2014 | 2021 |
| Grenita Lathan | 2021 | Present |
