= Missouri State Bears basketball =

Men's basketball team of Missouri State University

2026–27 Missouri State Bears basketball team
- University: Missouri State University
- First season: 1908; 118 years ago
- Head coach: Cuonzo Martin (3rd, 6th overall season)
- Location: Springfield, Missouri
- Arena: Great Southern Bank Arena (capacity: 11,000)
- Conference: Conference USA
- Nickname: Bears
- Colors: Maroon and white
- Student section: Bearpawcalypse

NCAA Division I tournament Sweet Sixteen
- 1999

NCAA Division I tournament appearances
- Division I 1987, 1988, 1989, 1990, 1992, 1999 Division II; 1958†, 1959*, 1966, 1967*, 1968, 1969*, 1970, 1973, 1974*, 1978 * National runner-up † Elite Eight

NAIA tournament champions
- 1952, 1953
Other NAIA tournament results
Appearances	1939, 1943, 1949, 1952, 1953, 1954

Conference tournament champions
- Mid-Continent Conference; 1987, 1989 Missouri Valley Conference; 1992

Conference regular-season champions
- Missouri Intercollegiate Athletic Association; 1928, 1931, 1934, 1935, 1949, 1950, 1952, 1953, 1954, 1958, 1959, 1966, 1967, 1968, 1969, 1970, 1973, 1974, 1978 Mid-Continent Conference; 1987, 1988, 1989, 1990 Missouri Valley Conference; 2011

Uniforms
Home	Away

The Missouri State Bears basketball team is the NCAA Division I men's basketball program of Missouri State University in Springfield, Missouri. The Bears compete in Conference USA. They are currently coached by Cuonzo Martin. Missouri State plays its home games at the 11,000-seat Great Southern Bank Arena.

The Bears have been a Division I school since the 1982–83 season. Prior to 2005, the school was known as Southwest Missouri State. Missouri State has appeared six times in the NCAA tournament, most recently in 1999. The Bears most notable NCAA tournament run came in 1999 when they advanced to the Sweet 16, defeating #5 seed Wisconsin and #4 seed Tennessee.

Prior to joining Division I, they were members of the NAIA, winning national championships in 1952 and 1953, and NCAA Division II, where they were the national runner-up four times (1959, 1967, 1969, 1974). They were also champions of the 2010 CollegeInsider.com Tournament.

== Postseason ==
=== NCAA Division I tournament results ===
The Bears have appeared in six NCAA Division I Tournaments, all as Southwest Missouri State. Their combined record is 3–6.

Year	Seed	Round	Opponent	Result
1987	No. 13	Round of 64; Round of 32	No. 4 Clemson #5 Kansas	W 65–60; L 63–67
1988	No. 13	Round of 64	No. 4 UNLV	L 50–54
1989	No. 14	Round of 64	No. 3 Seton Hall	L 51–60
1990	No. 9	Round of 64	No. 8 North Carolina	L 70–83
1992	No. 12	Round of 64	No. 5 Michigan State	L 54–61
1999	No. 12	Round of 64; Round of 32; Sweet Sixteen	No. 5 Wisconsin #4 Tennessee #1 Duke	W 43–32; W 81–51; L 61–78

=== NCAA Division II tournament results ===
The Bears appeared in ten NCAA Division II Tournaments. Their combined record is 23–10.

Year	Round	Opponent	Result
1958	Regional Quarterfinals; Regional Finals; Elite Eight	Centenary; Regis; South Dakota	W 74–69; W 73–65; L 58–63
1959	Regional Quarterfinals; Regional Finals; Elite Eight; Final Four; National Championship Game	Abilene Christian; Centenary; Hope; Cal State Los Angeles; Evansville	W 87–67; W 65–62; W 76–74; W 72–59; L 67–83
1966	Regional Semi-finals; Regional Finals	Arkansas State; Abilene Christian	W 72–71; L 58–63
1967	Regional Quarterfinals; Regional Finals; Elite Eight; Final Four; National Championship Game	Arkansas AM&N; Lincoln (MO); Valparaiso; Illinois State; Winston-Salem State	W 83–80; W 87–77; W 86–72; W 93–76; L 74–77
1968	Regional Semi-finals; Regional Finals	Colorado State-Pueblo; Evansville	W 69–68; L 73–79
1969	Regional Quarterfinals; Regional Finals; Elite Eight; Final Four; National Championship Game	Saint Olaf; South Dakota State; Montclair State; Ashland; Kentucky Wesleyan	W 75–47; W 87–74; W 92–76; W 58–48; L 71–75
1970	Regional Semi-finals; Regional 3rd Place Game	South Dakota State; Cornell (IA)	L 71–82; W 76–65
1973	Regional Semi-finals; Regional 3rd Place Game	South Dakota State; Colorado State-Pueblo	L 74–85; W 76–62
1974	Regional Quarterfinals; Regional Finals; Elite Eight; Final Four; National Championship Game	North Dakota; Kentucky Wesleyan; Saint Joseph's (IN); New Orleans; Morgan State	W 71–63; W 89–86; W 80–78; W 68–63; L 52–67
1978	Regional Semi-finals; Regional Finals	Columbus State; Lincoln (MO)	W 69–67; L 83–84

=== NAIA tournament results ===
The Bears appeared in six NAIA Tournaments. Their combined record is 15–4, and they are two-time NAIA national champions (1952, 1953).

Year	Round	Opponent	Result
1939	First round	East Texas State	L 45–68
1943	First round	Murray State	L 44–72
1949	First round Second Round	Portland; Beloit	W 59–56; L 47–66
1952	First round Second Round; Quarterfinals; Semi-finals; National Championship Game	Chadron State; Indiana State; Morningside; Southwest Texas State; Murray State	W 87–66; W 82–64; W 87–74; W 70–67; W 73–64
1953	First round Second Round; Quarterfinals; Semi-finals; National Championship Game	Gonzaga; Stetson; Nebraska Wesleyan; Indiana State; Hamline	W 95–74; W 98–71; W 78–74; W 84–78; W 79–71
1954	First round Second Round; Quarterfinals; Semi-finals; National 3rd Place Game	East Tennessee State; Gustavus Adolphus; Texas State; Western Illinois; Arkansas Tech	W 77–72; W 66–57; W 65–59 OT; L 75–78; W 75–61

=== NIT results ===
The Bears have appeared in 10 National Invitation Tournaments (NIT). Their combined record is 10–10.

Year	Round	Opponent	Result
1986	First round Second Round; Quarterfinals	Pittsburgh; Marquette; Florida	W 59–52; W 83–69; L 53–54
1991	First round Second Round	Coppin State; Southern Illinois	W 57–47; L 69–72
1993	First round Second Round; Quarterfinals	St. Joseph's; Jackson State; UAB	W 56–34; W 70–52; L 52–61
1997	First round	North Carolina State	L 66–77
2000	First round Second Round	SMU; Mississippi	W 77–64; L 48–70
2005	First round Second Round	Rice; Davidson	W 105–82; L 76–86
2006	First round Second Round; Quarterfinals	Stanford; Houston; Louisville	W 76–67; W 60–59; L 56–74
2007	First round	San Diego State	L 70–74
2011	First round Second Round	Murray State; Miami (FL)	W 89–76; L 72–81
2022	First round	Oklahoma	L 72–89

=== CIT results ===
The Bears have appeared in two CollegeInsider.com Postseason Tournaments (CIT). Their combined record is 4–1 and were the 2010 Champions.

Year	Round	Opponent	Result
2010	First round Quarterfinals; Semi-finals; Finals	Middle Tennessee State; Louisiana Tech; Creighton; Pacific	W 87–79; W 69–40; W 67–61; W 78–65
2014	First round	Murray State	L 63–66

== Retired numbers ==
Missouri State Bears retired numbers
No.	Player	Tenure	No. ret.	Ref.
22	Winston Garland	1985–1987		
32	Danny Moore	1996-1999	2023	
32	Daryel Garrison (Note: Bears all-time leading scorer with 1,975 points.)	1971–1975	2008	
43	Jerry Anderson	1951–1955		
54	Curtis Perry	1966–1970		

== Bears in NBA ==
=== Draft ===
The following former Missouri State players were drafted into the NBA:

- Don Anielak
- Merton Bancroft
- Joe Beck
- Winston Garland
- Forrest Hamilton
- Keith Hilliard
- Jack Israel
- Alize Johnson
- Bud Julian
- Bill Lea
- Jonathan Mogbo
- Curtis Perry
- Russ Robinson
- Lou Shephard
- Preston Ward
