= Glendale High School (Missouri) =

Location
- 2727 South Ingram Mill; Springfield, Missouri; United States

Information
- Type: Public Secondary
- Established: 1963; 63 years ago
- Status: Open
- School district: Springfield Public Schools
- Superintendent: Grenita Lathan
- Principal: Josh Groves
- Teaching staff: 77.00 (on an FTE basis)
- Grades: 9–12
- Enrollment: 1,369 (2023–2024)
- Student to teacher ratio: 17.78
- Campus: Suburban
- Colors: Scarlet red and Columbia blue
- Athletics conference: Central Ozark
- Nickname: Falcons
- Rival: Kickapoo High School
- Website: glendalehs.gusd.net

Glendale High School is an American high school in the southeast area of Springfield, Missouri, near U.S. Route 65. Glendale is one of five public high schools in Springfield Public Schools. In 2010, it had an enrollment of 1,416 students.

== Sports ==
- Boys' Soccer: 2019, 2018, 2017, 2016, 2015 2014, 2005, 2004, 2003, 2002, 2001, 2000, 1998, 1997, 1994, 1991, 1990

== Music and Arts ==
The choral students at Glendale have been selected for District, State, Regional and National Honors Choirs. In 2005, the Glendale High School Chamber Choir sang for the National American Choral Directors Convention in Los Angeles, California, and also in St. Louis, Missouri for the 2006 Southwestern Regional ACDA Convention.

Glendale's orchestra has two divisions: the freshman and advanced.

Glendale's band consists of concert, jazz, marching bands. The marching band has performed in numerous bowl parades, the most recent being the 2001 Orange Bowl Parade.

The art department is active in The Memory Project, a program where artists make portraits of underprivileged children around the world in order to foster friendship, caring, and a sense of self-worth

== Alumni ==
- Mark Bailey, former MLB player (Houston Astros, San Francisco Giants)
- Zak Cummings, professional mixed martial artist for the UFC's Welterweight Division
- Johnny Morris, founder of American Outdoor store Bass Pro Shops, (class of 1966)
- Steve Rogers, former MLB player (Montreal Expos)
- Tom Whitlock, songwriter and musician, best known for his Academy Award-and Golden Globe-winning song "Take My Breath Away", from the film Top Gun

== Incidents ==
In May 2023 a teacher was recorded by a student using a racial slur multiple times while in class. The student was suspended for using an electronic device in class although her family retained an attorney encourage SPS to reconsider its actions. The teacher who used the racial slur later resigned.
