= Life School =

Life
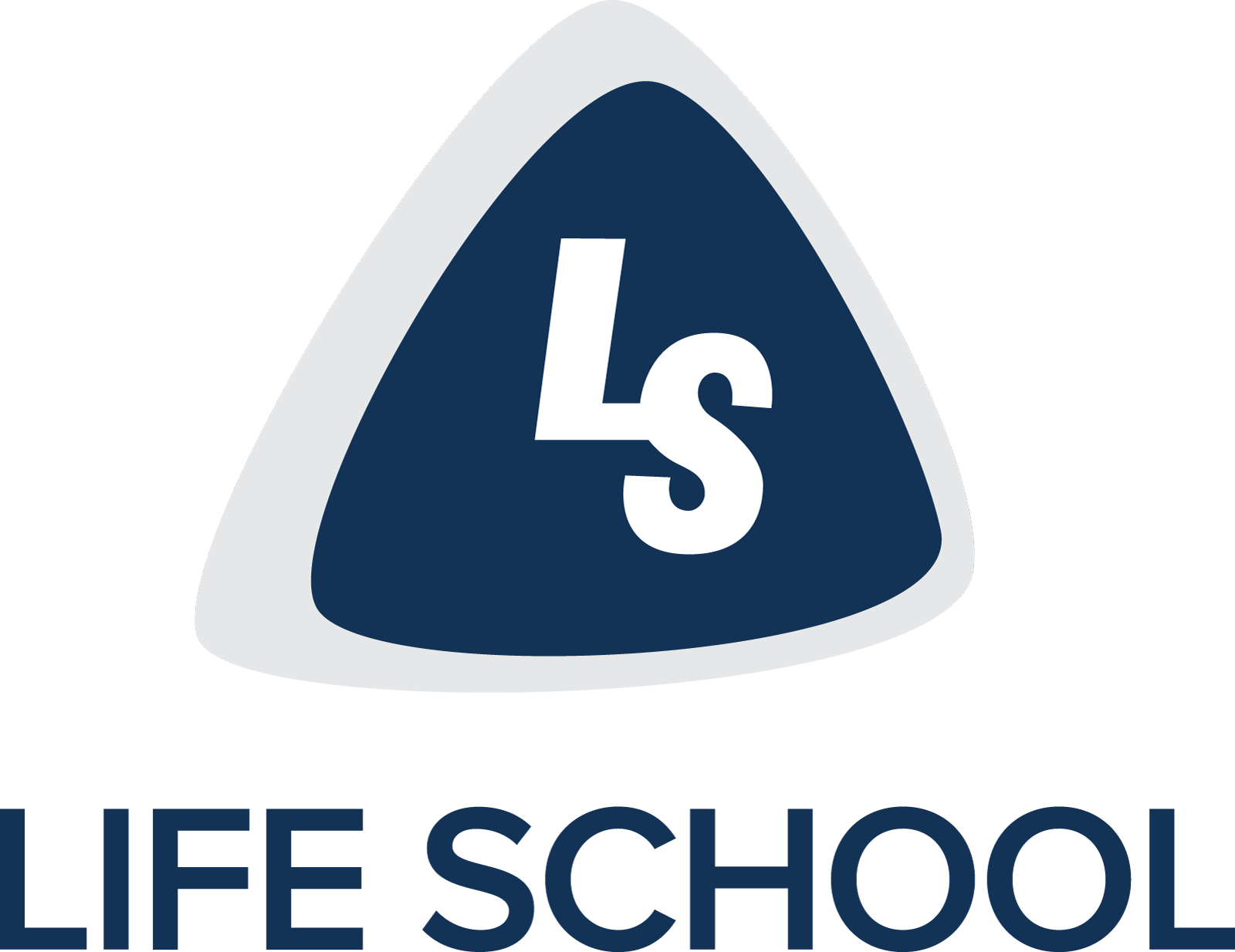

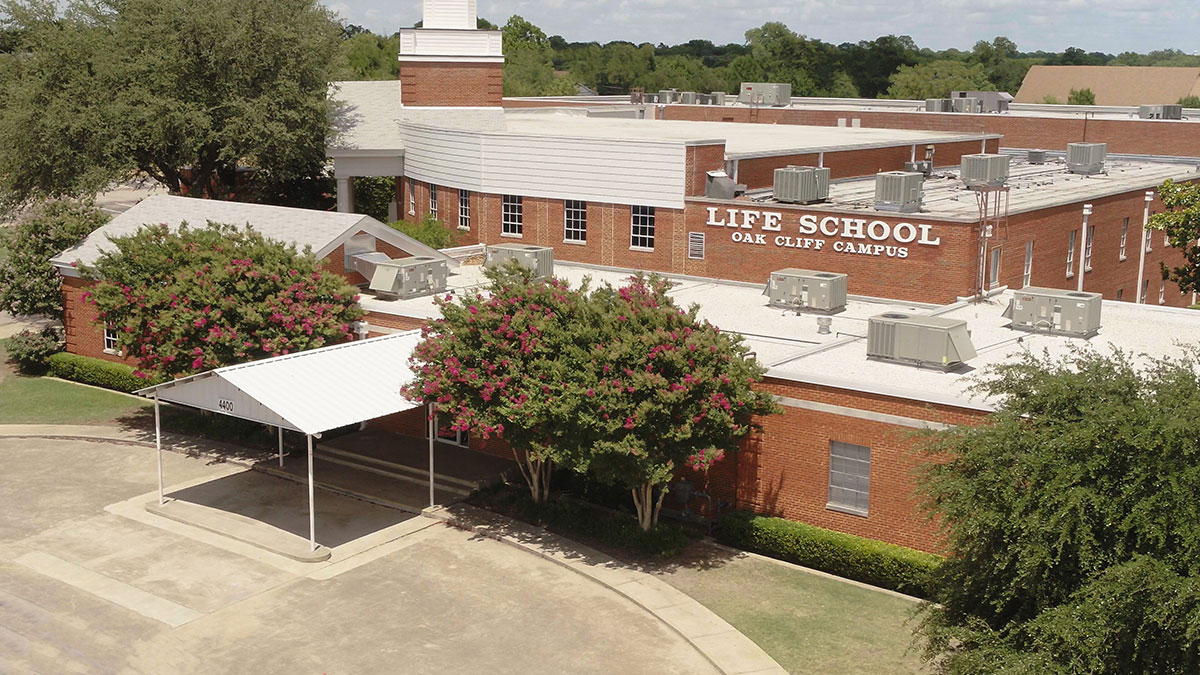
- Original Life School campus at Oak Cliff, founded in 1998.

Location
- 132 East Ovilla Road, Suite A Oak Cliff, Red Oak, Lancaster, Waxahachie, Carrollton, Cedar Hill, Mountain Creek; Red Oak, Texas 75154; United States; 32.577050°N 96.821369°W

Information
- School type: Public, Charter
- Motto: Ready to Learn. Ready to Lead. Ready for Life.
- Established: 1988
- Founder: Dr. Tom Wilson
- Superintendent: Dr. Brent Wilson
- Grades: K-12
- Average class size: 28
- Hours in school day: 8
- Colors: blue (all campuses); blue/red (Carrollton, Red Oak, Waxahachie); blue/green (Mountain Creek); blue/gray (Cedar Hill); blue/orange (Lancaster)
- Athletics conference: University Interscholastic League
- Mascot: Mustang (Red Oak, Waxahachie), Bear (Lancaster), Lion (Oak Cliff), Eagle (Mountain Creek), Cardinal (Carrollton), Cougar (Cedar Hill)
- Team name: Life School Mustangs, Life School Bears, Life School Lions, Life School Eagles, Life School Cardinals, Life School Cougars
- Accreditation: Texas Education Agency
- Tuition: Free
- Website: lifeschools.net
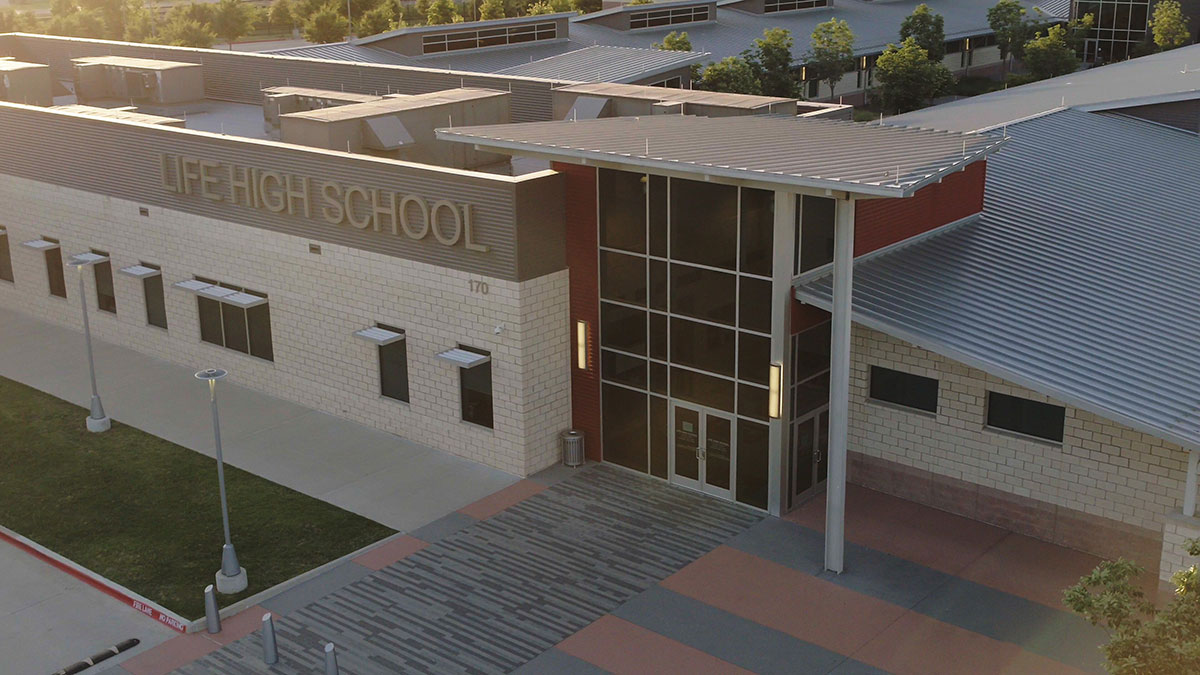
- Life High School Waxahachie as pictured in 2019

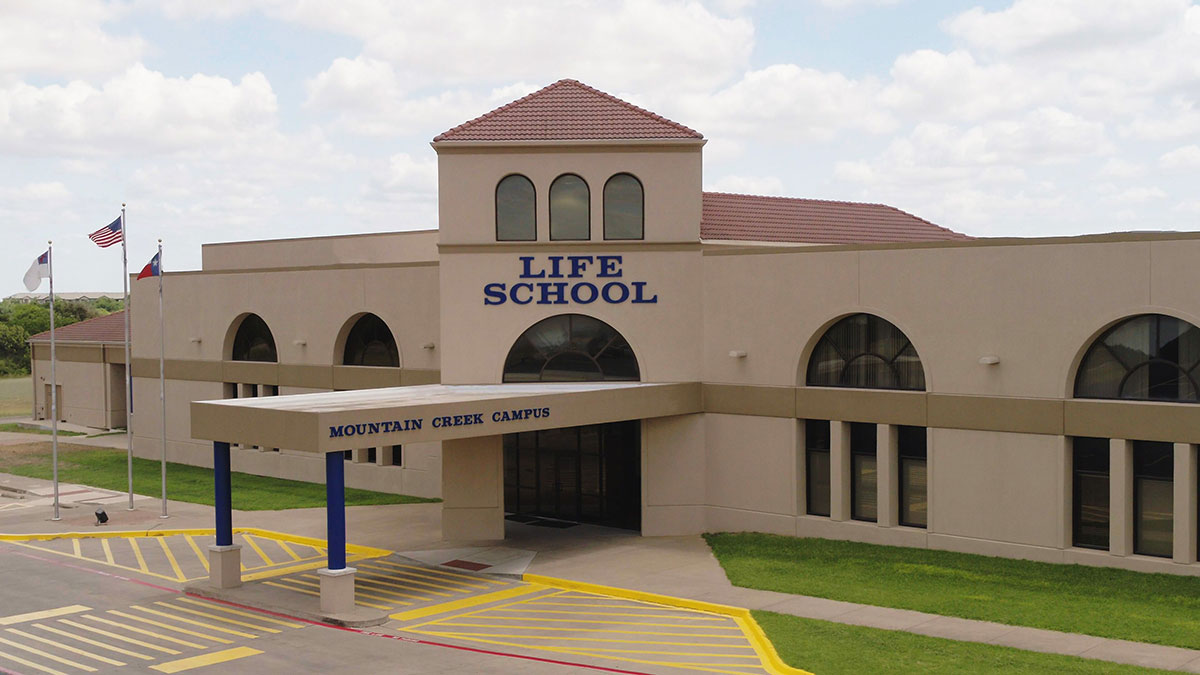
- Life Elementary School Mountain Creek as pictured in 2019

Life School is a charter school operator headquartered in Red Oak, Texas. It was chartered in Texas in 1998 and has campuses in Dallas-Fort Worth, Cedar Hill, Carrollton, Lancaster, Oak Cliff, Red Oak, Waxahachie, and West Dallas. It operates with a private-school atmosphere and adheres to public-school education requirements mandated by the state.

Life School has been recognized by the state of Texas on numerous occasions for its allocation of resources, earning a five-star rating from the Texas Comptroller's Office. It is also the first charter school in Texas to access the Permanent School Fund, allowing its school bonds used for funding to be guaranteed by the state.

== History ==
Life School was founded by Dr. Tom Wilson in 1989. Prior to that time, Wilson was employed in the educational system since 1966, serving as a pastor, speaker, and director of private schools. Wilson began Life School in Dallas as a conduit to train adults who were unemployed and had no employable skills, while at the same time offering activities for youth and children. Wilson reorganized the school's objective after finding a low success rate regarding people whose lifestyles changed permanently. During the 1990s, Wilson worked to make Life School a free-tuition school in response to the gang activities in the Dallas area that made the city the murder capital (per capita) of the United States. Wilson's goal was to teach and train children before they became involved in gang activities.

Life School filed a charter school application with the Texas Education Agency in 1997. The application was completed by Wilson along with other community leaders that included educational lawyers and other educators. In March 1998, the school was granted the charter and began open enrollment as a free tuition public school in August that same year. The school became popular in the communities it served and parents camped out overnight to enroll their children. The first Life School campus to open was in Oak Cliff, Texas in Dallas County.

Life School became the first charter school in Texas to access Permanent School Funding. This took place in 2014 after the Texas State Board of Education expanded such funding to include charter schools. It eliminated its high rate of financing with the Permanent Education Fund now guaranteeing its bonds. Life School sold around $100 million in tax-exempt and taxable bonds to refund debt and build a new high school, for which it broke ground in 2014. Located in Waxahachie, Texas, the school is 125,000 square feet and its educational facilities include science laboratories, computer labs, athletic practice fields, and space for extracurricular activities. The high school campus is also Life School's seventh campus, with the school saving roughly $13 million through its first bond sale guaranteed by the Permanent School Fund.

== Education and campuses ==
Life School is a tuition-free, public school following required curricula and administering state-mandated tests that include the Texas Assessment of Knowledge and Skills. The graduation rate for Life School was reported as 99.5% from 2004 to 2014, with 79% of graduates attending postsecondary school within two years of graduation.

The school also provides a $1,000 college scholarship named for founder Dr. Tom Wilson, awarded to the valedictorians of each graduating class. Life School offers organized athletics at various campus. Some sport activities include basketball, football, track and field, and cheerleading.

=== Campus locations ===
- Oak Cliff Elementary - (Oak Cliff, Dallas) - kindergarten through 6th grade
- Oak Cliff Middle - (Oak Cliff) - 7th and 8th grades
- Oak Cliff Secondary - (Oak Cliff) - 9th through 12th grades
- Red Oak - (Red Oak) - kindergarten through 6th grade
- Waxahachie Middle School - (Waxahachie) - 7th and 8th grades
- Waxahachie High School - (Waxahachie) - 9th through 12th grade
- Lancaster Elementary - (Lancaster) - kindergarten through 6th grade
- Cedar Hill Elementary - (Cedar Hill) - kindergarten through 6th grade
- Mountain Creek Elementary - (Oak Cliff) — kindergarten through 6th grade
- Carrollton Elementary - (Carrollton) — kindergarten through 5th grade

== Awards and recognition ==
Life School was recognized by the Texas Comptroller's Office in 2012, being named to its Honors Circle for excellence in resource allocations. It earned the same distinction in 2013 and 2014 by receiving a five-star rating, the highest given by the Texas Comptroller. It was one of only 45 districts and 13 charter schools to receive the distinction. The same year, it was awarded the highest rating - superior achievement - by the Texas Education Agency. Life School Oak Cliff was rated a bronze award as one of the best high schools by U.S. News & World Report in 2014.
