= Jared Hudgins =

American football coach (born c. 1988)

Current position
- Title: Head coach
- Team: Nelson
- Conference: SAC
- Record: 6–14

Biographical details
- Born: c. 1988 (age 37–38)
- Education: Southwestern Assemblies of God University (2011, 2018); Hardin–Simmons University (2022)

Playing career
- 2007–2010: SAGU
- Position: Linebacker

Coaching career (HC unless noted)
- 2011–2012: Midland Christian HS (TX) (assistant)
- 2014: Midland Christian HS (TX) (assistant)
- 2015–2017: SAGU (DL)
- 2018: SAGU (DC)
- 2019–2020: Fort Worth Christian HS (TX)
- 2021–2023: SAGU (DC/LB)
- 2024–present: Nelson

Head coaching record
- Overall: 6–14 (college); 10–10 (high school)

Jared Hudgins (born c. 1988) is an American college football coach. He is the head football coach for Nelson University, a position he has held since 2024. He was the head football coach for Fort Worth Christian School from 2019 to 2020. He also coached for Midland Christian School. He played college football for SAGU as a linebacker.

== Head coaching record ==
=== College ===
Year	Team	Overall	Conference	Standing	Bowl/playoffs
Nelson Lions (Sooner Athletic Conference) (2024–present)
2024	Nelson	3–7	1–7	9th	
2025	Nelson	3–7	3–5	T–5th	
2026	Nelson	0–0	0–0		
Nelson:		6–14	4–12		
Total:		6–14			

=== High school ===
Year	Team	Overall	Conference	Standing	Bowl/playoffs
Fort Worth Christian Cardinals () (2019–2020)
2019	Fort Worth Christian	5–5	2–2	3rd	
2020	Fort Worth Christian	5–5	2–2	3rd	
Fort Worth Christian:		10–10	4–4		
Total:		10–10			
