= Central High School (Springfield, Missouri) =

- School mascot sometimes referred to as "Pug"

Location
- 423 E. Central; Springfield, Missouri; United States; 37°13′05″N 93°17′18″W

Information
- Type: Public
- Established: 1893; 133 years ago
- School district: Springfield R XII
- Superintendent: Grenita Lathan
- Principal: Ashley Felton
- Teaching staff: 120.00 (on an FTE basis)
- Grades: 6–12
- Enrollment: 1,449 (2023–2024)
- Student to teacher ratio: 12.08
- Colors: Black; Red; White
- Athletics conference: Central Ozark
- Nickname: Bulldogs
- Newspaper: Central High Times
- Graduation rate: 84.0 (As of 2017)
- Website: central.sps.org

Central High School is a high school located in uptown Springfield, Missouri. The school, a part of Springfield Public Schools, was Springfield's first high school to be built. Construction of the building was completed in 1893. The first graduating class graduated a year later in 1894 consisting of two out of the 76 seniors that were enrolled. The school was renamed Central High School after the construction of Springfield's second oldest high school, Parkview High School, in 1956. Central's mascot is a Bulldog, named Pug by the students at the time of his creation. Central is also the home to the Kiltie Drum and Bugle Corps. This corps was created by Robert Ritchie Robertson in 1926, and has the distinction of being the first all-female Scottish pipe and drum corps in the country.

== History ==
Construction of Central High School began 1893 and was completed in January 1894 at a cost of $100,000.

=== Campus ===
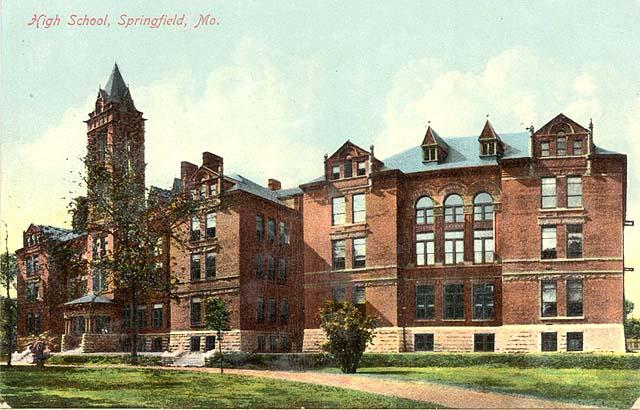
Postcard of Central High, then known as Springfield High School, taken between 1907 and 1909.

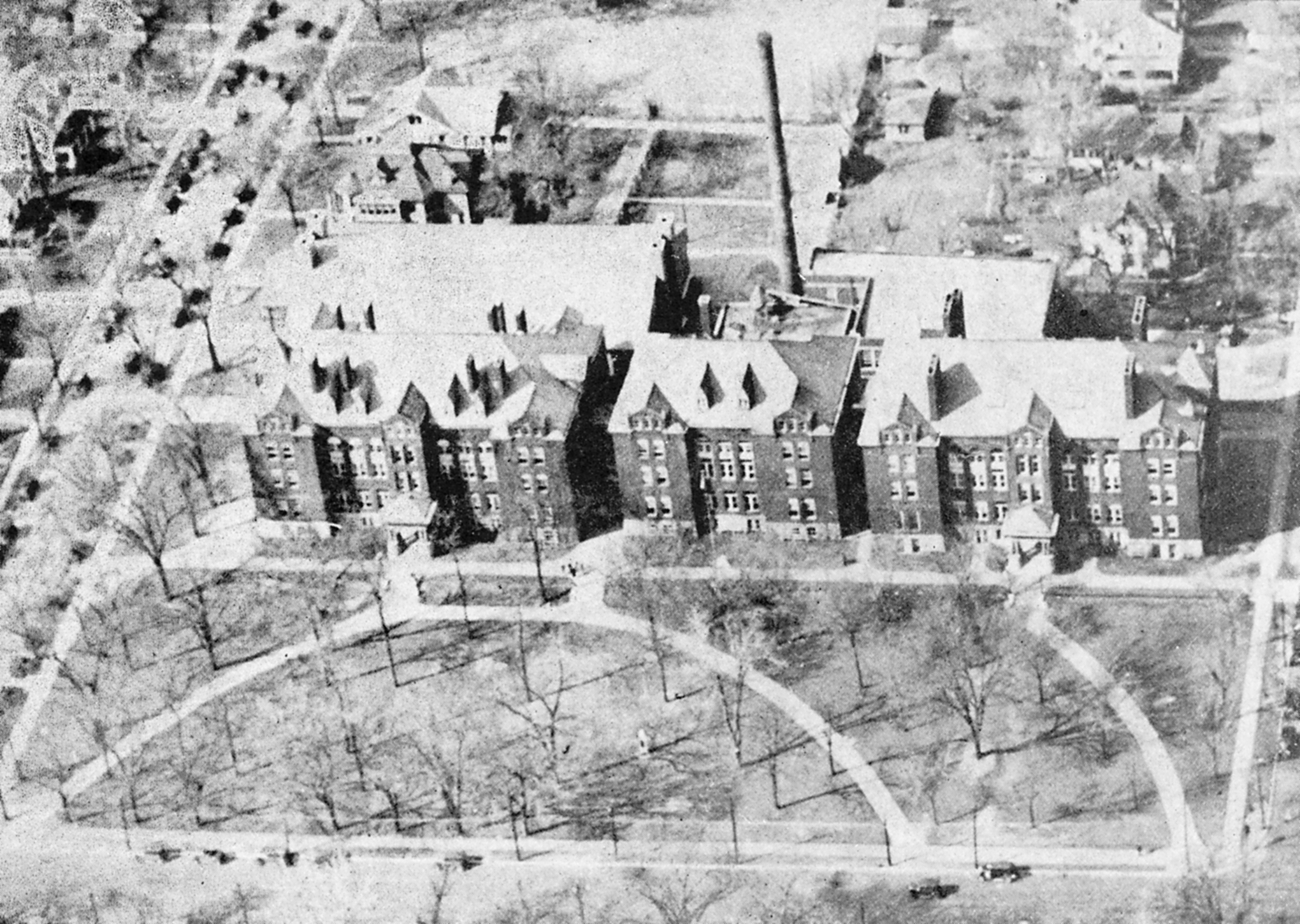
Central High-school 1933 - Aerial View

Central has varied structure since its original construction in 1894. The original building is almost fully intact, albeit with many additions, the first of which was the Central Wing added in 1907. The Central Wing was then followed up by the addition of the Eastern Wing in 1913. Following the construction of the Eastern Wing, the Auditorium was constructed in 1940. The most recent addition to the building, the "New Wing", was completed in 2002. The construction of the "New Wing" drastically improved the nature of the school in adding another building to the campus. The building houses Central's library, various classrooms, and an improved lunchroom.

The Jim Ball Gymnasium, nicknamed "The Pit" for its sunken floor, houses the school's basketball and volleyball games. The Jim Ball Gymnasium is named after the successful Central student and basketball coach, Jim Ball.

Some features of the campus are no longer present. The hallways to Central's auditorium once were home to many ivy plants. The plants were removed in the 1970s for fear of possible damage to the building, but ivy murals were painted on the walls of a hallway to replace them. The hallway became known as the "Hall of Ivy". The Hall of Ivy has become a memorial at the school for students who have died. The school originally had a bell tower on the front of the building, however it was removed in 1916 for the strain it placed on the façade.

== Notable programs ==
Central High School is one of the eleven high schools in Missouri to offer the IB Diploma Programme. Central High School also features the Springfield Scholars Program (formerly the Middle Years Scholars Program). The program offers accelerated high school classes to gifted middle schoolers. In the program middle schoolers are semi-integrated with the rest of the population and take SSP (Springfield Scholars Program) classes, high school honors classes with the rest of the population along with Pre-IB classes with other high school Pre-IB students.
The school also features the A+ program, a state program that offers College tuition in exchange for tutoring.

== Central Intelligence ==
Central High School's Broadcast Journalism II class develops and releases a bi-weekly in-house social show program entitled "3-Minute Thursdays", sometimes referred to as "3MT". The students taking part in the program also have the opportunities to create documentaries. The program is produced by students for the student body and informs students of local events, both in Springfield and at Central.

Central Intelligence has received a total of six pacemaker awards and in 2011 received Best of Show at the National Scholastic Press Association show in Minneapolis. In 2012, Central Intelligence again won a pacemaker at the National Scholastic Press Association, this time held in Austin.

== Notable alumni ==
- Bob Barker
- William A. Beiderlinden, U.S. Army major general
- Marc Breedlove
- Linda Carol Brown
- Jack Israel
