= West Plains R-7 School District =

School district in Missouri, U.S.

West Plains R-VII School District

Location
- West Plains, Missouri United States

District information
- Type: Public
- Motto: Maximizing educational opportunities while creating productive citizens.
- Grades: Pre-K through 12; Vocational
- Superintendent: Dr. Lori Wilson
- Asst. superintendent(s): Dr. Luke Boyer; Dr. Julie Williams
- Accreditations: Missouri School Improvement Program; North Central Association
- Schools: West Plains Elementary School; South Fork Elementary School; West Plains Middle School; West Plains High School; South Central Career Center
- Budget: $24 million
- NCES District ID: 2931680

Students and staff
- Students: 2,086
- Teachers: 178
- Staff: 189
- Student–teacher ratio: 12:1
- Athletic conference: Ozark Conference
- District mascot: Zizzer
- Colors: Red and white

Other information
- Website: www.zizzers.org

The West Plains R-VII School District, also called West Plains Schools, is located in West Plains, Missouri.

== Schools ==
West Plains R-VII School District operates five schools across Howell County, Missouri, four of which are in the city limits of West Plains. The district operates two elementary schools, one middle school, and one high school. The district also runs one school focused on vocational education, South Central Career Center.

=== Elementary schools ===
West Plains Elementary School is located in northeastern West Plains at the intersection of Allen Street and U.S. Route 160. The school serves pre-kindergarten through fourth grade before students move on to West Plains Middle School.

South Fork Elementary School is located nine miles southwest of West Plains on U.S. Route 160. It serves pre-kindergarten through sixth grade, after which students are sent to West Plains Middle School.

=== Middle school ===
West Plains Middle School is located just south of West Plains Elementary School, at the intersection of Allen Street and Olden Street. It serves fifth through eighth grades, with students coming in from West Plains Elementary School for all four years and from South Fork Elementary School for the final two years. The building features a tornado shelter, which is open to the public during tornado warnings, and is otherwise used as a gymnasium/cafeteria and for office space.

=== High school ===
West Plains High School is the district's only high school, located adjacent to West Plains Middle School at the intersection of Olden Street and Howell Avenue. Students come from West Plains Middle School as well as the five rural districts surrounding West Plains which do not offer high school education. The school is accredited with the North Central Association and is A+ eligible for Missouri students.

Through a partnership with Missouri State University-West Plains, a group of West Plains High School students is given the opportunity to attend college in lieu of their last two years of high school credits, graduating with both a high school diploma and associate degree.

South Central Career Center is a vocational and secondary education institution. Programs are split into secondary programs, offered to junior and senior students from WPHS and various area high schools, and adult programs, offered to adults out of high school. The school is split across two campuses, with the main campus and offices on Thornburgh Avenue in West Plains and the other located on the high school campus.

==== Secondary programs ====
- Agricultural Education
- Business, Marketing, and Informational Technology Education
- Family Consumer Sciences and Human Services Education
  - Family and Consumer Sciences
  - Culinary Arts
- Health Sciences
  - Health Science
  - Pharmacy Tech
- Skilled Technical Sciences
  - Auto Collision
  - Auto Technology
  - Building Trades
  - Welding
- Technology and Engineering Education
  - Creative Design

==== Adult programs ====
- Business, Marketing, and Informational Technology Education
- Family Consumer Sciences and Human Services Education
  - Culinary Arts
- Health Sciences
  - Practical Nursing
  - Surgical Technology
- Skilled Technical Sciences
  - Auto Collision
  - Auto Technology
  - Carpentry
  - Welding
- Technology and Engineering Education
  - Creative Design

== See also ==
- Fairview R-XI School District
- Glenwood R-VIII School District
- Howell Valley R-I School District
- Richards R-V School District
- Junction Hill C-12 School District
