= Parkview High School (Springfield, Missouri) =

Location
- 516 W Meadowmere; Springfield, Missouri 65807; 37°11′23″N 93°17′49″W

Information
- Type: Public High School
- Established: 1956
- School district: Springfield Public Schools
- Superintendent: Dr. Grenita Lathan
- Principal: Josh Lollis
- Teaching staff: 88.38 (on an FTE basis)
- Enrollment: 1,274 (2023-2024)
- Student to teacher ratio: 14.42
- Colors: Green and gold
- Athletics conference: Ozark Conference
- Mascot: Viking
- Graduation rate: 86.0 (As of 2012)
- Website: Parkview H.S.

Parkview High School is a public high school located in Springfield, Missouri. Part of Springfield Public Schools, it was the second high school to have been built in Springfield, after Central High School.

== History ==
Parkview graduated its first class in 1957. The following year, a new wing was constructed due to the large number students enrolling. In 1992, an auditorium was added to Parkview for its music and drama productions. In 2001, a new music room was finished and renovations to other classrooms were completed. The most recent changes to Parkview have been the demolition of the old north wing and adding a new wing to replace it. It was completed and occupied in January 2006. It was formally dedicated on September 21, 2006. Phase two of the addition was completed at the beginning of the 2008–09 school year. The second addition included a new library media center, cafeteria and kitchen, and many classrooms; the old library and cafeteria were converted to classrooms as well. Over 90% of the building is new or renovated construction since the completion of the two-phase, 20 million dollar project in November 2008. A formal dedication ceremony for Phase II was held on September 18, 2008.

The school's mascot is the Viking. Its news show is called Vike Vision. Parkview has an ID policy that requires students to wear an ID badge.

== Notable people ==
=== Alumni ===
- Scott Bailes, Former MLB player (Cleveland Indians, California Angels, Texas Rangers)
- Eric Burlison, politician
- Betsy Fogle, politician

=== Faculty ===
- Grant Wistrom, football coach
