= Hillcrest High School (Springfield, Missouri) =

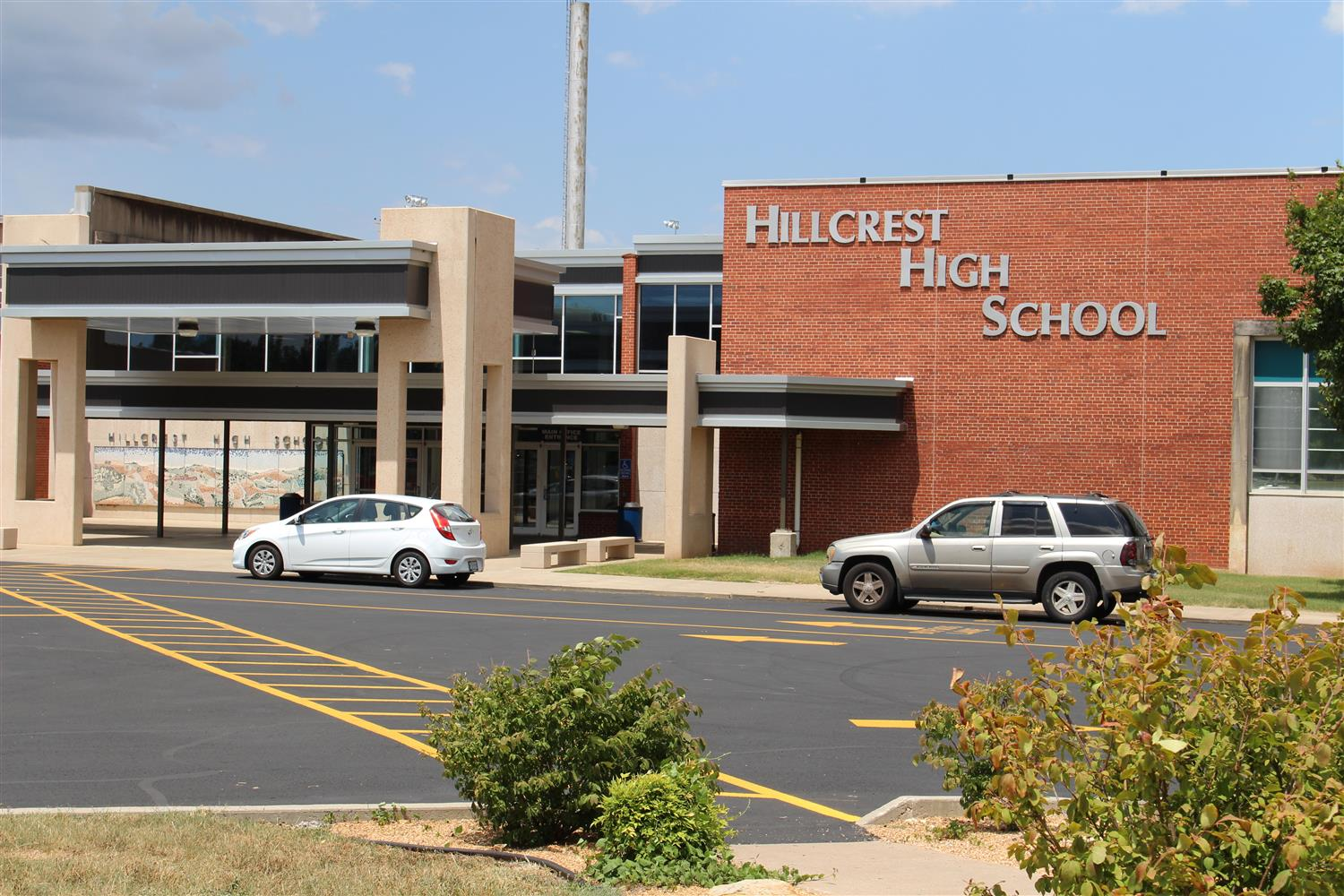

Location
- 3319 N Grant Avenue; Springfield, Missouri; United States; 37°15′27″N 93°17′56″W

Information
- Type: Public
- Established: 1958; 68 years ago
- School district: Springfield Public Schools
- Superintendent: Grenita Lathan
- Principal: Robert Kroll
- Teaching staff: 60.60 (on an FTE basis)
- Grades: 9–12
- Enrollment: 1,017 (2022–2023)
- Student to teacher ratio: 16.78
- Campus: Suburban
- Colors: Blue, Orange (alternative Silver)
- Athletics conference: Ozark Mountain Conference
- Nickname: Hornets
- Website: hillcrest.sps.org

Hillcrest High School is a high school located at 3319 N. Grant Avenue in Springfield, Missouri. Hillcrest High School is one of five public high schools in Springfield Public Schools. It is located in the north part of Springfield. It was opened in 1958. As of 2015, there was an enrollment of 1,054 students, making it the smallest of the five public high schools in Springfield.

== Notable programs ==
=== FFA (Future Farmers of America) ===
Hillcrest is the first, and only school in the Springfield R–12 district to have a Future Farmers of America chapter. The chapter was chartered in 2019.

=== JROTC ===
Hillcrest is the only high school in Springfield, Missouri to have a JROTC program, funded by the U.S Army. The JROTC program teaches students citizenship and patriotism. They are recognized throughout the community for their volunteerism and community service. The JROTC Program at Hillcrest has several activities the different teams participate in. They have a drill team, drone team, raider team, and color guard. The Drill team includes simple but precise marching movements competing with drill cards in multiple competitions ranging from Topeka West to Leavenworth, winning many trophies over the years as the 'Hornet Battalion'. The drone team includes programming,flying, scouting, and communication between the team. Raiders is a physically demanding, team building, competition, some years competing in Nationals. The color guard has performed at several events in the community from the Missouri State bears basketball games to the 9/11 ceremony the JROTC holds at Hillcrest High School every year on September 11.

=== Hillcrest basketball ===
Hillcrest boys have won state championships in 1984 and 2010, with a runner-up in Class 5 in 2012. The Lady Hornets also advanced to the final four in 2012.

=== Hillcrest baseball ===
Hillcrest High School is known for its baseball program. Dick Birmingham is its most well known coach. Under Birmingham's reign, 120 players received college baseball scholarships or signed professional contracts, with six players drafted professionally from the 1966 Hillcrest team (a national high school record) and four others taken during the 1972 major league draft. In 1990 he was inducted into the halls of fame of both the American Baseball Coaches Association and the Missouri High School Baseball Coaches Association. The most recent player drafted was pitcher Jon Barratt by the Tampa Bay Devil Rays in 2003. Twenty-three players have been drafted from Hillcrest since 1960, more than any other school in Springfield. Some of its better known players are: Bob Detherage (LAD), George Frazier (NYY), Doug Bennett (LAD) and Keith Drumright (OAK), just to name a few. Hillcrest has won eight state championships, six in American Legion baseball (1970, 1971, 1976, 1979, 1987, and 2002), and two in high school (1979, 1988). On January 26, 2014, the Hillcrest baseball program (Legion and high school) was inducted into the Missouri Sports Hall of Fame, the highest honor the state bestows on scholastic programs. This was the first baseball program to be inducted. Coaches that followed Birmingham included Dave Davis, Byron Hagler, and Ryan and Brant Schaffitzel, who is the current head coach.

== Renovations ==
On April 4, 2006, Springfield Public Schools' voters approved an 18-cent increase in the district's debt service levy. Among the approved projects was an upgrade to the science and technology labs at Hillcrest and two other Springfield high schools.

The project added new science–technology classroom labs, renovated old lab space into additional classrooms; remodeled and provided new areas for student services. The final cost was $5.75 million. Construction began in September 2007 and finished in 2008.

== Notable alumni ==
- Daniel Arnall, NBC Nightly News, Executive Producer, Weekend Edition; Past Executive Producer of Bloomberg News
- John Ashcroft, former Missouri Governor, former U.S. Senator and former U.S. Attorney General
- Dorial Green-Beckham, Former Missouri Tigers football, Oklahoma Sooners football, Tennessee Titans, and Philadelphia Eagles wide receiver
- Bob Detherage, Former MLB player (Kansas City Royals)
- Keith Drumright, Former MLB player (Houston Astros, Oakland Athletics)
- George Frazier, Former MLB player (St. Louis Cardinals, New York Yankees, Chicago Cubs, Cleveland Indians, Minnesota Twins)
- Dana Powell, comedian
- Emily Scott, USA Winter Olympic Speed Skater
