= Kickapoo High School (Springfield, Missouri) =

School in Springfield, Missouri, US

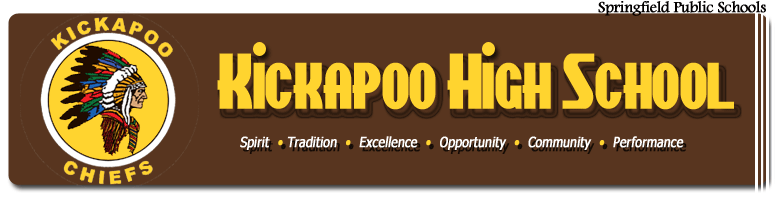

Location
- 3710 S Jefferson Ave; Springfield, Missouri; United States; 37°08′48″N 93°17′25″W

Information
- Type: US Public Secondary
- Motto: Spirit, Tradition, Excellence, Opportunity, Community, Performance
- Established: 1971
- Status: Open
- School district: Springfield Public Schools
- Superintendent: Dr. Grenita Lathan
- Principal: Bill Powers
- Teaching staff: 100.00 (on an FTE basis)
- Grades: 9–12
- Enrollment: 1,918 (2023-2024)
- Student to teacher ratio: 19.18
- Colors: Gold and Brown
- Athletics conference: Central Ozark
- Nickname: Chiefs
- Rival: Glendale High School
- Website: kickapoo.sps.org

Kickapoo High School is a public high school located in Springfield, Missouri, United States. Having officially opened in October 1971, it is one of five public high schools within Springfield Public Schools. The school is named after its location in a portion of Springfield known as the "Kickapoo Prairie" and after the Native American Tribe. The school's mascot is the "Kickapoo Chief". In 2014, Kickapoo High had about 2,100 students and 100 teachers, making it the largest of Springfield's five high schools. After adjustments were made to district lines, this number dropped to 1,800 in the 2015–2016 school year.

== Academics ==
Kickapoo's characteristics include Honors, Dual Enrollment, Advanced Placement courses, an Orthopedically Handicapped Program, a Learning Resource and a Japanese language program. Kickapoo also participates in a program known as A+, in which students must maintain a 2.5 GPA and complete a certain number of service hours, most of which are completed through peer tutoring. Students who successfully complete the A+ program automatically get a free two-year scholarship to a two-year college in the state.

== Journalism ==
PN Media is a student-produced news organization on the campus of Kickapoo High School. The flagship paper, The Prairie News, has been published since the school opened in 1971.

In 2008 the program underwent a major revision when the paper was renamed 'PN Media'. In May 2009 KHS Prairie News was launched to provide Kickapoo students with a more up-to-date news source.

In recent years, the Journalism Department switched its publication to a full color magazine dubbed the "KHQ" standing for "Kickapoo High Quarterly."

Kickapoo is also the host of the ChiefTV Network. This is a student produced broadcast journalism group which produces video announcements on a daily basis.

== School schedule ==
=== Block system ===
The school schedule is a four block system: Each day, students have four classes around 95 minutes each in length. The semester is 18 weeks long.

=== Chief Time ===
The 2004/2005 school year saw the introduction of a program called 'Chief Time.' In the 2011/2012 School year, the Chief Time schedule was changed to include 35 minutes in each class throughout the week. Students may do different things during this block, depending on their grade and academic status.

Students with extreme academic issues can be assigned to a Chief Time class where they receive tutoring for the duration of Chief Time.

== Notable alumni ==
In alphabetical order by surname:

- Bobby Berk, American interior designer and a host on Queer Eye
- Trevon Brazile, basketball player
- Kim Crosby (class of 1978), singer and actress
- Heather Ezell (class of 2005), basketball coach and former professional basketball player
- Lucas Grabeel, actor
- Brent Huff, American actor
- Jack Jewsbury American soccer player
- Jay Kenneth Johnson, actor
- Molly Miller, college basketball coach
- Brad Pitt (class of 1982), actor, voted best dressed in the school, 1982
- Spencer Robarge (class of 2021), professional tenpin bowler on the PBA Tour
- Suzie Streeter & Stacy McCall (b. 1973 & 1974, class of 1992), missing persons
- Anthony Tolliver (b. 1985) basketball player
- Travis Vokolek (b. 1998) tight end for the Arizona Cardinals in the NFL
