= List of Northwestern Eagles head football coaches =

The Northwestern Eagles football program is a college football team that represents University of Northwestern – St. Paul in the Upper Midwest Athletic Conference, a part of the NCAA Division III. The team has had 6 head coaches since its first recorded football game in 1973. The current coach is Matt Moore, who first took the position for the 2017 season.

== Key ==
Key to symbols in coaches list
General		Overall		Conference		Postseason (Note: Although the first Rose Bowl Game was played in 1902, it has been continuously played since the 1916 game, and is recognized as the oldest bowl game by the NCAA. "—" indicates any season prior to 1916 when postseason games were not played.)	
No.	Order of coaches (Note: A running total of the number of head coaches, with coaches who served separate tenures being counted only once. Interim head coaches are represented with "Int" and are not counted in the running total. "—" indicates the team played but either without a coach or no coach is on record. "X" indicates an interim year without play.)	GC	Games coached	CW	Conference wins	PW	Postseason wins
DC	Division championships	OW	Overall wins	CL	Conference losses	PL	Postseason losses
CC	Conference championships	OL	Overall losses	CT	Conference ties	PT	Postseason ties
NC	National championships	OT	Overall ties (Note: Overtime rules in college football were introduced in 1996, making ties impossible in the period since.)	C%	Conference winning percentage		
†	Elected to the College Football Hall of Fame	O%	Overall winning percentage (Note: When computing the win–loss percentage, a tie counts as half a win and half a loss.)				

== Coaches ==
Statistics correct as of the end of the 2025 college football season.

No.	Name	Term	GC	OW	OL	OT	O%	CW	CL	CT	C%	PW	PL	CCs	NCs	Awards
1	Duane Christopherson	1973	7	1	6	0	.143	—	—	—		—	—	—	—	
2	Mel Boehland	1974–1988	134	77	56	1	.578	—	—	—		—	—	—	—	
3	Chub Reynolds	1989–1990	18	10	8	0	.556	—	—	—		—	—	—	—	
4	Jimmy Miller	1991–2000	96	46	50	0	.479	—	—	—		—	—	—	—	
5	Kirk Talley	2001–2016	164	112	52	0	.683	96	21	0	.811	1	6	—	—	—
6	Matt Moore	2017–present	84	42	42	—	.500	36	14	—	.720	0	2	1	—	—

table reference
