= 2017 Victory Bowl =

SAGU Lions	Campbellsville Tigers
(8–2)	(7–2)
28	41
Head coach: Frank Tristan	Head coach: Perry Thomas
	1	2	3	4	Total
SAGU	7	14	0	7	28
Campbellsville	6	13	13	9	41
- Date: November 18, 2017
- Season: 2017
- Stadium: Ron Finley Stadium
- Location: Campbellsville, Kentucky
- MVP: Offensive:Zerric Willis (Campbellsville); Defensive:Garland Webb (Campbellsville)
- Attendance: 1,000

The Victory Bowl, the 20th edition of the annual game, was a college football bowl game played on Saturday, November 18, 2017, at Ron Finley Stadium in Campbellsville, Kentucky. It was played after the previous year's Victory bowl was cancelled due to a lack of participating teams. It featured the Sagu Lions against the Campbellsville Tigers. The Tigers won their second Victory Bowl 41–28.

Campbellsville scored 28 unanswered points in the second half and used key stops throughout to seal its second NCCAA Victory Bowl Championship in program history, 41–28 over Southwestern Assemblies of God University (SAGU).

Campbellsville (8–2) put up 525 total yards of offense and held SAGU's high-powered rushing attack in check with only 110 yards on the ground. The eight wins is the sixth in program history and second the last three seasons.

== Scoring summary ==
Scoring summary

Quarter	Time	Drive			Team	Scoring information	Score	
Quarter	Time	Plays	Yards	TOP	Team	Scoring information	SAGU Lions	Campbellsville Tigers
1	13:04	5	75	1:56	Campbellsville Tigers	Zerric Willis 65-yard touchdown reception from Hunter Brown, Bradley Bates kick Blocked	0	6
1	9:32	8	64	3:22	SAGU Lions	JP Lowery 34-yard touchdown run, Tluang Hmung kick Good	7	6
2	14:04	5	53	0:50	Campbellsville Tigers	Kendon Young 19-yard touchdown reception from , Bradley Bates kick Good	7	13
2	13:11	3	75	0:53	SAGU Lions	Jeremy Carr 77-yard touchdown reception from CJ Collins, Tluang Hmung kick Good	14	13
2	8:40	8	68	4:21	SAGU Lions	Bryant Dotson 35-yard touchdown reception from CJ Collins, Tluang Hmung kick Good	21	13
2	7:47	4	78	0:53	Campbellsville Tigers	Kendon Young 20-yard touchdown run, 2-point Hunter Brown Pass Failed	21	19
3	13:07	2	24	0:22	Campbellsville Tigers	Wade Holtsclaw 3-yard touchdown run, 2-point Hunter Brown Pass Failed	21	25
3	7:36	2	29	0:35	Campbellsville Tigers	Wade Holtsclaw 17-yard touchdown run, Bradley Bates kick Good	21	32
4	9:20	6	53	2:56	Campbellsville Tigers	29-yard field goal by Bradley Bates	21	35
4	7:28	2	16	0:25	Campbellsville Tigers	Hunter Brown 1-yard touchdown run, Bradley Bates kick Blocked	21	41
4	3:26	12	58	3:49	SAGU Lions	Stephen Lawson 15-yard touchdown reception from CJ Collins, Tluang Hmung kick Good	28	41
"TOP" = time of possession. For other American football terms, see Glossary of American football.							SAGU Lions	Campbellsville Tigers
