= 2004 Victory Bowl =

Olivet Nazarene Tigers	Northwestern Eagles
(6–5)	(6–4)
24	14
Head coach: Gary Newsome	Head coach: Kirk Talley
	1	2	3	4	Total
Olivet Nazarene	7	10	7	0	24
Northwestern	0	0	0	14	14
- Date: November 20, 2004
- Season: 2004
- Stadium: Reynolds Field
- Location: Roseville, Minnesota
- MVP: Offensive:Bobby Miller (Northwestern); Defensive: Chris Doersam (Olivet Nazarene)
- Attendance: 275

The 2004 Victory Bowl, the Eighth edition of the annual game, was a college football bowl game played on Saturday, November 20, 2004, at Reynolds Field in Roseville, Minnesota. It featured the Olivet Nazarene Tigers against the Northwestern Eagles. The Tigers won their second Victory Bowl 24–14. The Tigers had a 24-0 lead through three quarters and never let go stopping a late comeback by the Eagles in the 4th Quarter.

== Scoring summary ==
Scoring summary

Quarter	Time	Drive			Team	Scoring information	Score	
Quarter	Time	Plays	Yards	TOP	Team	Scoring information	Olivet Nazarene Tigers	Northwestern Eagles
1	4:49	8	49	1:46	Olivet Nazarene Tigers	Jon Lochner 2-yard touchdown run, Matt Soulia kick Good	7	0
2	5:40	7	65	3:30	Olivet Nazarene Tigers	Kevin Jones 14-yard touchdown reception from Joe Boseo, Matt Soulia kick Good	14	0
2	0:50	9	41	2:56	Olivet Nazarene Tigers	37-yard field goal by Matt Soulia	17	0
3	3:42	12	46	5:11	Olivet Nazarene Tigers	Aaron Palmer 5-yard touchdown run, Matt Soulia kick Good	24	0
4	14:46	8	66	3:49	Northwestern Eagles	Paul Gibbs 14-yard touchdown reception from Bobby Miller, 2-point Stefan Redlin Pass from Bobby Miller Succeeded	24	8
4	5:25	6	50	0:32	Northwestern Eagles	Ben Younan 14-yard touchdown reception from Bobby Miller, 2-point Bobby Miller Pass Failed	24	14
"TOP" = time of possession. For other American football terms, see Glossary of American football.							Olivet Nazarene Tigers	Northwestern Eagles
