= 2022 Victory Bowl =

Olivet Nazarene Tigers	SAGU Lions
(7–4)	(7–4)
21	16
Head coach: Eric Hehman	Head coach: Greg Ellis
	1	2	3	4	Total
Olivet Nazarene	14	7	0	0	21
SAGU	0	3	7	6	16
- Date: November 18, 2022
- Season: 2022
- Stadium: Lumpkins Stadium
- Location: Waxahachie, Texas
- MVP: Offense: Keaton Dudik; Defense: Oscar Grimaldo

United States TV coverage
- Network: SAGU Sports Network

The 2022 Victory Bowl was a college football bowl game played on November 18, 2022, at Lumpkins Stadium in Waxahachie, Texas. It featured the Olivet Nazarene Tigers against the SAGU Lions. The Tigers held on for a 21–16 win against the Lions. Olivet Nazarene and SAGU were both NAIA schools, with ONU playing in the football-only Mid-States Football Association (MSFA) and SAGU playing in the Sooner Athletic Conference (SAC). Despite only being an associate member, ONU was allowed to compete in the Victory Bowl because SAGU was the only eligible full member. The lack of eligible teams would be a continuing problem for the event; the 2022 Victory Bowl was the final Victory Bowl due to no NCCAA teams being bowl eligible and willing to play in 2023 or 2024, and the NCCAA dropping all football sponsorship outright in 2025. Even though both teams had similar total yards and turnovers, the Tigers dominated the Time of Possession, staying on offense for over 46 minutes of the game.

== Victory Bowl history ==
The ONU Tigers had played in five previous Victory Bowl Games, winning all five. Their most recent victory up to this game was in 2019, where they crushed the Greenville University Panthers 69–8. SAGU also had a storied history with the Victory Bowl, appearing in four other Victory Bowls over the years. The Lions won two of these games, including the previous year's Victory Bowl, defeating the Sterling University Warriors 31–14.

== Game play ==
=== First quarter ===
ONU kicked off to start the game. The kick went out of bounds, so SAGU got great field position, starting at the 35. SAGU then marched up to Olivet's 21 yard line before fumbling the ball. ONU recovered the ball and marched 86 yards down the field to score the first points of the game with a Cameron Crouch pass to Jalen Dunnigan. On SAGU's next drive, they turned the ball over after a 4th and 10 snap sailed over the punter's head. The ball was recovered by the Tigers on their own 10 yard line. They would score on the very next play, opening their lead to 14–0.

=== Second quarter ===
The Lions were finally able to get on the board around halfway through the second quarter after the 27-yard field goal attempt by Kieran Woodley went through the uprights. While they did not get much done offensively, the Tigers defense came up strong on the Lions' next drive. The Tigers' Oscar Grimaldo intercepted a pass by Briley Green and returned it for a touchdown to increase the Tigers' lead to 21–3.

=== Third quarter ===
The first six drives of the second half all ended in punts. The only scoring of the third quarter came when a Tigers' punt was blocked by Justen Campbell and scooped up by KePatrick Magee, who took it to the endzone. This cut the Tigers' lead down to 21-10 heading into the fourth quarter.

=== Fourth quarter ===
The Lions cut the Tigers' lead even further in the forth quarter when they drove down the field and scored a touchdown off of a 17-yard rush by Keaton Dudik. The Lions attempted a two-point conversion, but this failed. This brought the score to 21–16, making it a one-possession game. Despite there being over 7 minutes left on the clock after the touchdown, neither team was able to score. The final nail in the coffin came for the Lions when they were unable to convert a fourth down just nine yards away from the endzone with less than four minutes to play. The Tigers got a first down and then lined up in victory formation to win the game 21–16 and a record Sixth Victory Bowl.

=== Scoring summary ===
Scoring summary

Quarter	Time	Drive			Team	Scoring information	Score	
Quarter	Time	Plays	Yards	TOP	Team	Scoring information	Olivet Nazarene Tigers	SAGU Lions
1	5:49	11	86	4:28	Olivet Nazarene Tigers	Jalen Dunnigan 21-yard touchdown reception from Cameron Couch, Kayde Mahuka kick Good	7	0
1	4:02	1	10	0:07	Olivet Nazarene Tigers	Arthur Walker 10-yard touchdown run, Kayde Mahuka kick Good	14	0
2	8:00	5	13	2:12	SAGU Lions	27-yard field goal by Kieran Woodley	14	3
2	4:41	-	-	-	Olivet Nazarene Tigers	Interception returned 47 yards for touchdown by Oscar Grimaldo, Kayde Mahuka kick Good	21	3
3	4:02	-	-	-	SAGU Lions	KePatrick MaGee 30 Blocked Punt Return Touchdown, Kieran Woodley Kick Good	21	10
4	7:02	5	71	1:19	SAGU Lions	Keaton Dudik 17-yard touchdown run, 2-point Briley Green Pass Failed	21	16
"TOP" = time of possession. For other American football terms, see Glossary of American football.							Olivet Nazarene Tigers	SAGU Lions
