= Mike Murdock =

American televangelist

- Born: Michael Dean Murdock; April 18, 1946 (age 79); Lake Charles, Louisiana, U.S.
- Occupation(s): Evangelist, songwriter, pastor, author
- Years active: 1965–present
- Website: official website

Michael Dean Murdock (born April 18, 1946) is an American Contemporary Christian singer-songwriter, televangelist and pastor of The Wisdom Center ministry based in Haltom City, Texas. Murdock preaches around the world and is best known for his promotion of Biblical Wisdom. He hosts the School of Wisdom with Mike Murdock television program.

== Life and work ==
Murdock was born in Lake Charles, Louisiana, to J.E. and Willie Murdock, and has four sisters. In 1964, Murdock graduated from LaGrange High School in Lake Charles. He attended Southwestern Assemblies of God University in Waxahachie, Texas, but left after three semesters in 1966.

The Fort Worth Star-Telegram reported that he had registered 76 songs with the American Society of Composers, Authors and Publishers, according to unofficial data kept on those groups' web sites.

In 1989, as a pastor on The PTL Club, Murdock gained national attention during the PTL scandal when he asked viewers to donate to Jim Bakker and Tammy Faye Bakker claiming they helped broken marriages and people. The PTL later declared bankruptcy and Bakker went to prison for fraud related to his ministry.

During a sermon, Murdock bragged about buying two jets with cash, lambasting his congregation for being jealous and telling them to "act happy" for him. This was shown on an episode of Last Week Tonight with John Oliver and used by John Oliver to highlight the extravagant lifestyles of many televangelists.

In 1999, the Fort Worth Star-Telegram reported Murdock refused interview requests and had previously declined to answer questions about money.

In 2003, the Fort Worth Star-Telegram ran a series about Murdock giving association (donor-raised) money to select family members who were on his association's board.

On March 3, 2003, the Associated Press reported Murdock asked followers for money to help the poor but spent more than 60% of donations on overhead, including his salary, and only a tiny amount (reported to be "legal minimums of 1% to 3%") on helping the needy, or any other 'public interest'.

In 2004, the Fort Worth Star-Telegram reported Murdock "has started a church and the law allows him to keep his financial records behind closed doors." In August 2004, the association purchased the International Faith Center in Haltom City, Texas, and changed its name to The Wisdom Center, which it operates as a church.

On March 22, 2012, the Fort Worth Star-Telegram reported that Murdock's home, assessed at $1.5 million, was for sale. The 9,943 sq ft 25-room home located on 6.89 acres was first listed for sale on Realtor.com on November 29, 2011 for $3.2 million and then subsequently on September 4, 2013 for $2.7 million.

Murdock has appeared on TBN, CBN, BET, INSP, WORD, Daystar Television Network and other television networks, and his weekly television program, Wisdom Keys with Mike Murdock.
