= Ward Field =

Ward Field may refer to:

- Ward Field (airport), a public airport located one mile west of Gasquet, California
- Ward Field (Bourbonnais), a football stadium at Olivet Nazarene University
