= Brian Waters =

American football player (born 1977)

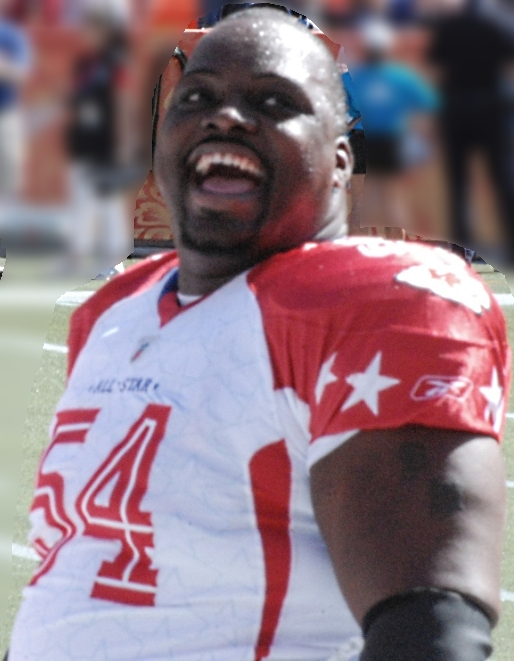
- Waters at the 2009 Pro Bowl

No. 54, 64
- Position: Guard

Personal information
- Born: February 18, 1977 (age 49); Waxahachie, Texas, U.S.
- Listed height: 6 ft 3 in (1.91 m)
- Listed weight: 320 lb (145 kg)

Career information
- High school: Waxahachie
- College: North Texas (1995–1998)
- NFL draft: 1999: undrafted

Career history
- Dallas Cowboys (1999)*; Berlin Thunder (2000); Kansas City Chiefs (2000–2010); New England Patriots (2011); Dallas Cowboys (2013)
- * Offseason or practice squad member only

Awards and highlights
- Walter Payton NFL Man of the Year (2009); 2× First-team All-Pro (2004, 2005); 6× Pro Bowl (2004–2006, 2008, 2010, 2011); Kansas City Chiefs Hall of Fame; First-team All-Big West (1998)

Career NFL statistics
- Games played: 186
- Games started: 170
- Stats at Pro Football Reference

Brian Demond Waters (born February 18, 1977) is an American former professional football player who was a guard in the National Football League (NFL). He played college football for the North Texas Mean Green and was signed by the Dallas Cowboys as an undrafted free agent in 1999. He played most of his career for the Kansas City Chiefs, and also played for the New England Patriots. He earned six Pro Bowl selections during his career.

== Early life ==
Waters was born in Waxahachie, Texas, and attended Waxahachie High School. He lettered in football. As a senior, he was an All-District honoree as both a tight end and defensive end. He made 16 receptions for 380 yards on offense, and made five sacks and 66 tackles on defense.

== College career ==
Waters attended the University of North Texas where he played for the North Texas Mean Green football team. He started his first three years at tight end, while recording 86 receptions for 975 yards and nine touchdowns. As a senior, he was moved to defensive end, but also played as a backup fullback and tight end. On defense, he had 45 tackles (32 solo) and 5 sacks.

== Professional career ==
Pre-draft measurables
Height	Weight	Arm length	Hand span	40-yard dash	10-yard split	20-yard split	20-yard shuttle	Three-cone drill	Vertical jump	Broad jump	Bench press
6 ft 2 1/8 in (1.88 m)	281 lb (127 kg)	32 in (0.81 m)	9 3/4 in (0.25 m)	4.97 s	1.73 s	2.91 s	4.65 s	7.52 s	32.0 in (0.81 m)	9 ft 6 in (2.90 m)	26 reps
All values from NFL Combine

=== Dallas Cowboys (first stint) ===
The Dallas Cowboys signed him as an undrafted free agent after the 1999 NFL draft to play tight end and fullback. He was released during training camp.

=== Kansas City Chiefs ===
The Kansas City Chiefs signed him as a free agent during the 2000 offseason and sent him to play with the Berlin Thunder in NFL Europe, with the plan of converting him to center.

Waters was named an All-Pro twice and was selected to the Pro Bowl five times in his 11-year career with the Kansas City Chiefs. In 2003, he was a part of a 13-3 Chiefs team. During the 2004 season, Waters was selected as the AFC Offensive Player of the Week for his play during a game against the Atlanta Falcons on October 24, 2004. The Chiefs scored an NFL-record eight rushing touchdowns during that game. Waters is the only offensive lineman in the AFC to have received the award, and the only lineman in the NFL to win since 1992. Waters was recognized as the recipient of the 2009 Walter Payton Man of the Year Award which honors a player's contribution on the field as well as off. He was ranked 67th by his fellow players on the NFL Top 100 Players of 2011.

After 11 seasons in Kansas City, he was released on July 28, 2011.

=== New England Patriots ===
On September 4, 2011, Waters signed with the New England Patriots. Waters, who started every game at right guard for the Patriots, was voted a starter for the Pro Bowl. After never having won a playoff game before the 2011 season, Waters played for the Patriots in Super Bowl XLVI. Prior to the start of the 2012 season, Waters refused to report to the Patriots. Waters said that if he were to play in 2012, it would be for a team close to his family in Texas. The Patriots finally released Waters from his contract on April 30, 2013.

=== Dallas Cowboys (second stint) ===
The Dallas Cowboys signed Waters to a one-year contract worth $3 million on September 3, 2013.

=== Retirement ===
Waters announced his retirement on September 2, 2014.
