= 2000 Victory Bowl =

Greenville Panthers	Northwestern Eagles
(6–4)	(8–2)
27	35
Head coach: Rob Harley	Head coach: Jimmy Miller
	1	2	3	4	Total
Greenville	13	7	7	0	27
Northwestern	6	12	0	17	35
- Date: November 18, 2000
- Season: 2000
- Stadium: Fawcett Stadium
- Location: Canton, Ohio
- MVP: Joe Wise (Northwestern)
- Attendance: 1,700

The 2000 Victory Bowl, the fourth edition of the annual game, was a college football bowl game played on Saturday, November 18, 2000, at Fawcett Stadium in Canton, Ohio. It featured the Greenville Panthers against the Northwestern Eagles. The Eagles won 35–27 coming back from a 20–6 deficit to win after scoring 17 unanswered points in the 4th quarter. An interception at the Northwestern 4 yard line by Dave Pazurek sealed the game for Northwestern. It would be the last game played at Fawcett Stadium as starting in 2001 it would be a home site championship game barring 2013 where it was played in Barron Stadium at Rome, Georgia.

== Scoring summary ==
Scoring summary

Quarter	Time	Drive			Team	Scoring information	Score	
Quarter	Time	Plays	Yards	TOP	Team	Scoring information	Greenville Panthers	Northwestern Eagles
1	4:39	10	67	3:37	Greenville Panthers	Bryan Meier 7-yard touchdown reception from Kyle Krober, Bryan Meier kick Good	7	0
1	4:12	2	24	0:27	Northwestern Eagles	Joe Wise 24-yard touchdown run, 2-point Pass Failed	7	6
1	1:25	6	39	2:47	Greenville Panthers	Dontrell Harriel 5-yard touchdown run, 2-point Bryan Meier Pass Failed	13	6
2	8:47	9	67	3:23	Greenville Panthers	Dontrell Harriel 10-yard touchdown run, Bryan Meier kick Good	20	6
2	2:38	6	24	3:18	Northwestern Eagles	Aaron Kern 3-yard touchdown reception from Jeff Waggoner, Andy Russell kick Failed	20	12
2	0:42	4	32	1:46	Northwestern Eagles	BJ Emmert 20-yard touchdown reception from Jeff Waggoner, 2-point Jeff Waggoner Pass Failed	20	18
3	7:33	11	84	4:44	Greenville Panthers	Kyle Krober 5-yard touchdown run, Bryan Meier kick Good	27	18
4	14:00	14	68	5:14	Northwestern Eagles	37-yard field goal by Steve Gibbs	27	21
4	5:19	13	77	5:23	Northwestern Eagles	BJ Emmert 4-yard touchdown reception from Jeff Waggoner, Steve Gibbs kick Good	27	28
4	1:48	5	37	2:19	Northwestern Eagles	Joe Wise 9-yard touchdown run, Steve Gibbs kick Good	27	35
"TOP" = time of possession. For other American football terms, see Glossary of American football.							Greenville Panthers	Northwestern Eagles
