= 2011 Victory Bowl =

Greenville Panthers	Campbellsville Tigers
(7–3)	(6–5)
7	21
Head coach: Ordell Walker	Head coach: Perry Thomas
	1	2	3	4	Total
Greenville	7	0	0	0	7
Campbellsville	7	7	5	2	21
- Date: November 19, 2011
- Season: 2011
- Stadium: Finley Stadium
- Location: Campbellsville, Kentucky
- MVP: Offensive:Wayne Coffee (Campbellsville); Defensive:Rodrick Dickerson (Campbellsville)
- Attendance: 750

The 2011 Victory Bowl, the 15th edition of the annual game, was a college football bowl game played on Saturday, November 19, 2011, at Finley Stadium in Campbellsville, Kentucky. It featured the Campbellsville Tigers against the Greenville Panthers. The Tigers won 21–7.

== Game play ==
=== First quarter ===
Campbellsville scored first when Diaz Bolden caught a 58-yard pass from Bobby Leonard with 14:06 remaining in the quarter. David Hon converted the extra point with a kick to put the score to 7–0. Later in the quarter, Greenville answered with a touchdown and extra point to tie it up 7–7, but it would be Greenville's only score for the game.

=== Second quarter ===
In the second quarter, Rodrick Dickerson recovered a fumble and returned it 82 yards to take the lead with 2:34 to play before halftime. Campbellsville held the lead for the remainder of the game.

=== Third quarter ===
Campbellsville managed a field goal and safety in the third quarter, advancing the score to 19–7.

=== Fourth quarter ===
Campbellsville took Greenville for a second safety in the fourth quarter. The score remained at 21–7 through the end of the game.

=== Scoring summary ===
Scoring summary

Quarter	Time	Drive			Team	Scoring information	Score	
Quarter	Time	Plays	Yards	TOP	Team	Scoring information	Greenville Panthers	Campbellsville Tigers
1	14:06	2	59	0:54	Campbellsville Tigers	Diaz Bolden 58-yard touchdown reception from Bobby Leonard, David Hon kick Good	0	7
1	13:55	-	-	-	Greenville Panthers	Tre Lewis 86 yard kickoff return touchdown, Josh Frewin Kick Good	7	7
2	2:34	-	-	-	Campbellsville Tigers	Fumble recovery returned 82 yards for touchdown by Rod Dickerson, David Hon kick Good	7	14
3	7:15	12	73	4:25	Campbellsville Tigers	19-yard field goal by David Hon	7	17
3	1:20	-	-	-	Campbellsville Tigers	Bryce Wright tackled in end zone for a safety by Rod Dickerson	7	19
4	3:33	-	-	-	Campbellsville Tigers	Cover Covert tackled in end zone for a safety by Team	7	21
"TOP" = time of possession. For other American football terms, see Glossary of American football.							Greenville Panthers	Campbellsville Tigers
