= Reynolds Field =

Reynolds Field may refer to:

- Reynolds Field (Northwestern), a multi-purpose stadium at Northwestern College, Minnesota
- Jackson County Airport (Michigan), Jackson, Michigan
