= Finley Stadium (disambiguation) =

Finley Stadium may refer to:

- Carter–Finley Stadium, located at North Carolina State University
- W. Max Finley Stadium, located at University of Tennessee at Chattanooga
- Ron Finley Stadium, located at Campbellsville University
