= Nelson University =

Christian university in Waxahachie, Texas

- Former names: Southwestern Assemblies of God College (1927–1994); Southwestern Bible School; Shield of Faith Bible School; Southern Bible Institute; Southwestern Assemblies of God University (1994–2024)
- Motto: Higher Education for a Higher Purpose
- Type: Private university
- Established: 1927
- Religious affiliation: Assemblies of God
- President: Kermit Bridges
- Provost: Kimberly Trewern
- Academic staff: 125
- Students: 2,012
- Undergraduates: 1,700
- Postgraduates: 312
- Location: Waxahachie, Texas, United States; 32.4038°N 96.8530°W
- Campus: 70 acres (0.28 km^{2}); Suburban
- Colors: Purple & gold
- Nickname: Lions
- Sporting affiliations: NAIA – Sooner; NCCAA Division I – Central
- Mascot: Judah the Lion
- Website: nelson.edu

Nelson University, formerly Southwestern Assemblies of God University (SAGU), is a private Christian university in Waxahachie, Texas, United States. Nelson is accredited by the Southern Association of Colleges and Schools Commission on Colleges and endorsed by the Assemblies of God USA. The university offers associate, bachelor's, master's, and doctoral degrees in liberal arts programs as well as programs in Bible and church ministries.

On August 1, 2024, Southwestern Assemblies of God University changed its name to Nelson University.

== History ==
=== Merger ===
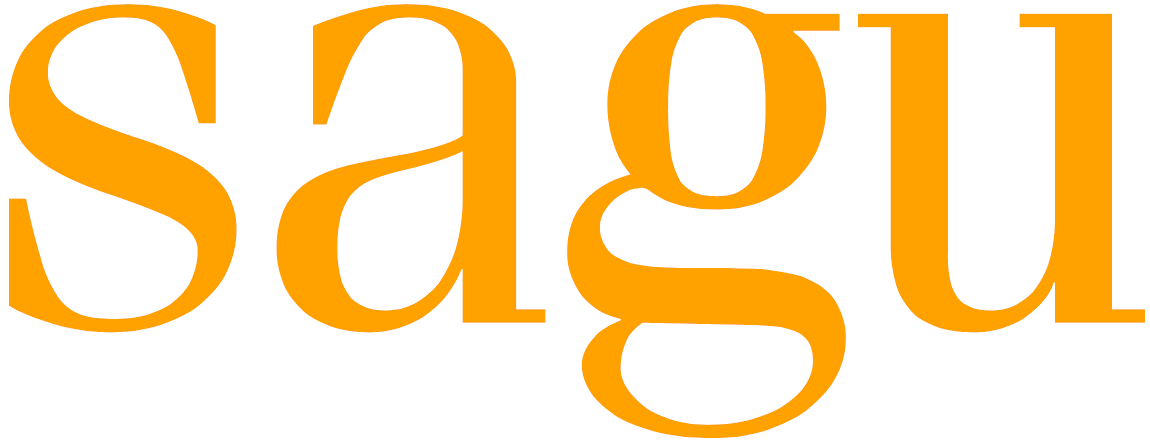
Former logo

Nelson University began life as three separate Bible schools. The first, known as Southwestern Bible School, was established in 1927 in Enid, Oklahoma, under the leadership of P.C. Nelson. The second, Shield of Faith Bible Institute, was founded in Amarillo, Texas, in 1931 under the direction of Guy Shields. It included a Bible school, a grade school and a high school. The third, which was operated as Southern Bible College in connection with the Richey Evangelistic Temple, began in 1931 at Goose Creek, Texas (now Baytown). It was started by J. T. Little in Trinity Tabernacle and moved to Houston in 1933. The school's name was then changed to Southern Bible Institute.

=== Discrimination law exception ===
Nelson's handbook lists homosexuality as an offense for which a student can be expelled. In 2015, the university was granted an exception to Title IX, allowing it to discriminate against LGBT students for religious reasons. In 2016, the organization Campus Pride ranked the college among the worst schools in Texas for LGBT students. Nelson University responded to the negative ranking by saying that the anti-LGBT student policy is clearly articulated to prospective students before they attend.

== Academics ==
Amidst the physical expansion, Nelson University experienced consecutive record enrollments in Fall 2007, Fall 2008, Fall 2009, and Fall 2010, reaching a milestone of 2,064.

== Athletics ==
The Nelson athletic teams are called the Lions. The university is a member of the National Association of Intercollegiate Athletics (NAIA), primarily competing in the Sooner Athletic Conference since the 2013–14 academic year.

=== Accomplishments ===
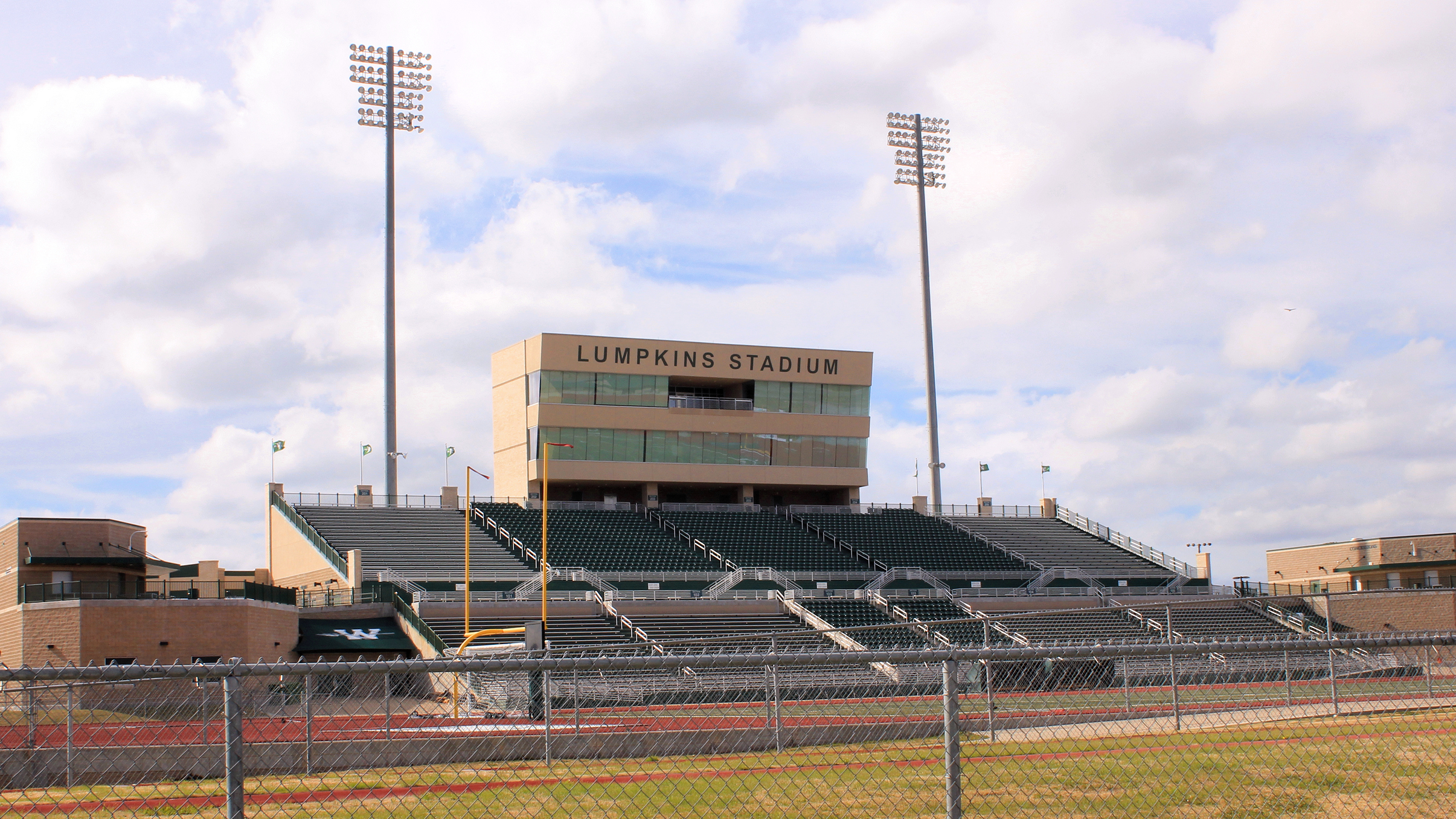
Nelson University shares a stadium with Waxahachie High School at Lumpkins Stadium for football.

The 2012–13 school year made 2013 a record-setting year for the Nelson Lions basketball team (then known as the SAGU Lions), with the Lions achieving the NAIA second-place championship ranking.

=== Judah the Lion ===
Influenced by Vice President George Brazell's acquisition of a four-month-old lion cub named Judah, Southwestern adopted the "Lion of Judah" as its mascot in 1963.

== Notable alumni ==
- Dani Chambers, voice actress
- Gary Chapman, musician and television talk show host
- Gary Elkins, politician
- Mike Evans, author and journalist
- John Hagee, pastor and televangelist
- Marla Hanson, screenwriter and model
- Jerry Lee Lewis, musician
- Marlin Maddoux, radio host
- Mike Murdock, televangelist and musician
- Levi Drake Rodriguez, professional football player
- Kristy Starling, musician
- Jimmy Swaggart, pastor and televangelist
