= Younts Stadium =

Stadium in Tigerville, South Carolina

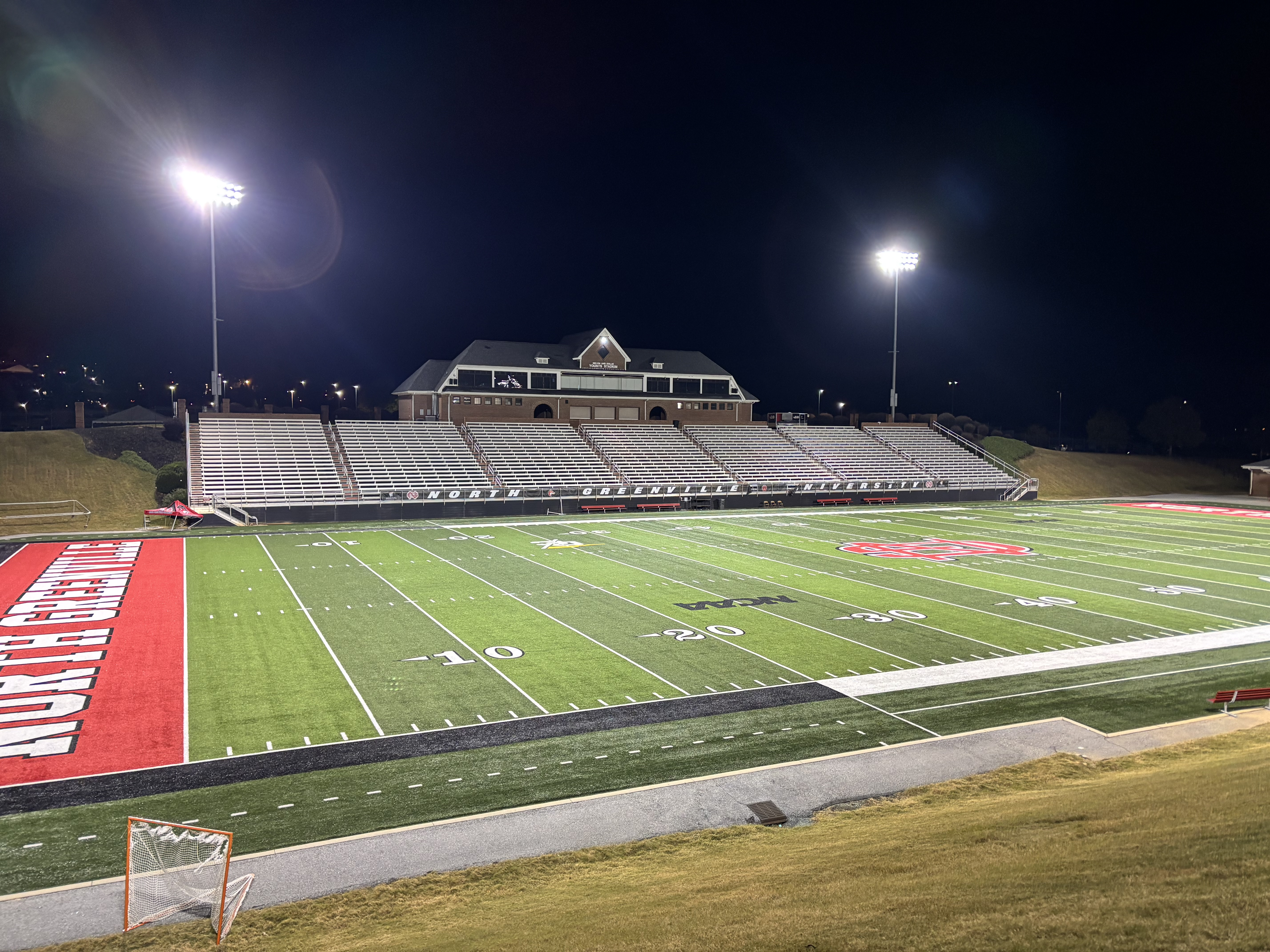
- Interactive map of Younts Stadium
- Full name: Melvin & Dollie Younts Stadium
- Location: Tigerville, South Carolina
- Coordinates: 35°3′50″N 82°22′29″W
- Owner: North Greenville University
- Capacity: 5,000

Construction
- Built: 2004-2005
- Opened: 2005

Tenant
- North Greenville Crusaders

Melvin & Dollie Younts Stadium is a 5,000-capacity multi-use stadium located in Tigerville, South Carolina, on the campus of North Greenville University where it serves as home to the school's football program.

Events and tenants
Preceded by Ward Field; Francis Field	Host of the Victory Bowl; 2006; 2010	Succeeded by Reeves Field; Finley Stadium
