= Waxahachie Global High School =

Location
- 275 Indian Dr; Waxahachie, Ellis County, Texas 75165; United States; 32°24′42.4428″N 96°50′16.1927″W

Information
- School type: Early College High School, T-STEM Academy, Public High School (9–12)
- Motto: At Global High, We Believe In Success!
- Established: 2008
- School district: Waxahachie Independent School District
- Principal: Derek Zandt
- Teaching staff: 28.04 (FTE)
- Grades: 9–12
- Enrollment: 356 (2023-2024)
- Average class size: 15 - 20 students
- Student to teacher ratio: 12.70
- Language: English
- Hours in school day: 8 hours
- Colors: Blue & Silver
- Mascot: Wolf
- Website: WGHS official website

Waxahachie Global High School is a high school in Waxahachie, Texas, founded in 2007 on the historic T.C. Wilemon campus. It is one of only 91 STEM (science, technology, engineering, and mathematics) academies in the state of Texas. It was additionally granted Early College High School status in 2009 through a partnership with Navarro College, allowing students to earn an associate degree along with their high school diploma. Recently, as of the start of the 2013-2014 school year, Global High made a partnership with UT Tyler for all the STEM-based college courses offered at Global. As a public charter school, students from Ellis County and surrounding areas can attend regardless of zoning. Many students commute from surrounding cities such as Waxahachie, Red Oak, Ennis, Maypearl, Midlothian, Palmer, Italy, Cedar Hill, and Desoto. In 2014, Waxahachie Global was named the "Best High School" by the U.S. News & World Report. Starting in the 2018-19 school year, the Global campus is located in the Billy R. Hancock Building (formerly the Ninth Grade Academy).

== School structure and graduation requirements ==
As both a T-STEM academy and Early College High School, Global has a unique structure. Students are fully enrolled in Navarro College after passing the Accuplacer tests or earning sufficient STAAR scores. Tuition is paid by the college with no cost to Global families, and as such, qualifying students are encouraged to fully utilize Navarro's resources. In addition to dual credit classes offered during the school day, students may take zero and ninth hour (before and after school) courses on Global's campus, and select evening and summer courses on Navarro's Midlothian or Waxahachie campus.

To graduate with an associate degree, students must earn 63 credit hours in select fields mandated by Navarro College. Global students who complete all the required courses in good standing are eligible to receive an Associate's of Science (AS) or an Associate's of Art (AA) degree. Any credit hours earned, regardless of degree completion status, may be transferred to participating four-year universities. This enables even non-degree earning students to transfer a minimum amount of credits to their continuing education without having to pay for the courses.

Global offers a variety of upper level science classes, engineering electives, mathematics from Geometry through college Calculus II, and a wide assortment of technical computer courses to fulfill its STEM standing. To fill unique graduation requirements, all students are required to take an engineering course in addition to two technology courses. Other graduation requirements follow the Texas standards.

The third pillar of Global's structure is project-based learning. This method teaches teamwork, responsibility, presentation skills, time management and more. Each teacher assigns around 5 projects per school year; often more in the case of engineering and technology courses. Popular projects have included designing math board games in Algebra II, building cardboard furniture in Engineering, creating an island society in World Geography, and filming skits, plays, and music videos for a variety of classes using school provided cameras.

== Unique courses ==
Global's STEM Department hosts a variety of advanced classes:

Science- Astronomy, Scientific Research & Design

Technology- Computer Applications, Digital & Interactive Media, Animation, Graphic Design, Web Technologies

Engineering- Introduction to Engineering & Design, Principles of Engineering, Civil Engineering & Architecture, Aerospace Engineering, Engineering Development and Design and Digital Engineering (discontinued in the 2012-2013 school year).

Several dual credit courses offer advanced study opportunities as well. Many students take 2 semesters of college chemistry instead of high school chemistry, and these courses are known as some of the most difficult at the school. Other dual credit science opportunities include Astronomy, Physical Science (college level Earth-Space Science), and Biology. Mathematics extends to Calculus, but instead of the usual AP classes, Global Calculus is dual credit. In some cases, these courses may not be taken during the regular school day, but only during additional class slots (zero/ninth hour, summer, evening, and mini-mester).

== Extracurriculars ==
Waxahachie Global High does not have any UIL-sanctioned sports teams. Past and present academic and social clubs at Global High include TSA, Robotics, DI, Interact, Student Council, Recipe Club, Pro-Life, Bible Study, Gaming Club, Philosopher's Club, Science Club, FCS, Choir, Prom Committee, Gardening Club, Art Club, Quidditch Club, Media Club, and NHS.

== Student awards and achievements ==
Global has produced National Merit Finalists, National Merit Commended Scholars, multiple Technology Student Association National Finalists and qualifiers, Singleton Scholarship awardees, Jack Kilby Prize recipients, over 500 degree-earning early college graduates, a President's Volunteer Service awardee, multiple teams of Destination Imagination National and Global Finalists, camp RYLA attendees, a FIRST Robotics Innovation in Control award, and numerous other state-level competition awards.
