= Perry Thomas =

American football coach

Coaching career (HC unless noted)
- 1986–1987: Allen County Scottsville HS (KY) (assistant)
- 1988–1991: Campbellsville HS (KY) (DC)
- 1992–1999: Campbellsville HS (KY)
- 2000–2007: Paducah Tilghman HS (KY)
- 2008–2022: Campbellsville

Head coaching record
- Overall: 65–90 (college)
- Bowls: 2–1
- Tournaments: 0–2 (NAIA playoffs)

Accomplishments and honors

Championships
- 2 MSC West Division (2014–2015)

Perry Thomas is an American football coach. He is the head football coach at Campbellsville University, a position he has held from 2008 to 2022, compiling a record of 65–90.

== Coaching career ==
In 2010, Thomas's team finished the regular season with a record of 7–4. They went to the Victory Bowl, losing to North Greenville by a score of 42–16.

== Head coaching record ==
=== College ===
Year	Team	Overall	Conference	Standing	Bowl/playoffs	NAIA^{#}
Campbellsville Tigers (Mid-South Conference) (2008–present)
2008	Campbellsville	3–8	2–4	5th (East)		
2009	Campbellsville	7–4	4–2	T–2nd (East)		
2010	Campbellsville	7–5	5–1	2nd (East)	L Victory	
2011	Campbellsville	7–5	3–2	T–2nd (East)	W Victory	
2012	Campbellsville	3–8	2–4	5th (West)		
2013	Campbellsville	4–6	3–2	T–3rd (West)		
2014	Campbellsville	7–4	4–1	T–1st (West)	L NAIA First Round	15
2015	Campbellsville	8–3	5–0	T–1st (West)	L NAIA First Round	12
2016	Campbellsville	2–8	0–5	6th (West)		
2017	Campbellsville	8–2	4–2	3rd (Bluegrass)	W Victory	20
2018	Campbellsville	4–6	3–3	T–4th (Bluegrass)		
2019	Campbellsville	1–9	0–7	8th (Bluegrass)		
2020–21	Campbellsville	1–6	1–6	8th (Bluegrass)		
2021	Campbellsville	1–8	1–6	8th (Bluegrass)		
2022	Campbellsville	2–8	0–8	9th		
Campbellsville:		65–90	37–53			
Total:		65–90				
National championship Conference title Conference division title or championship game berth
