= Reeves Field =

Stadium in Beaver Falls, Pennsylvania

Coordinates: 40.77054°N 80.321485°W

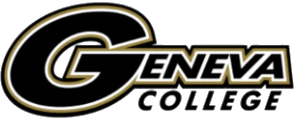

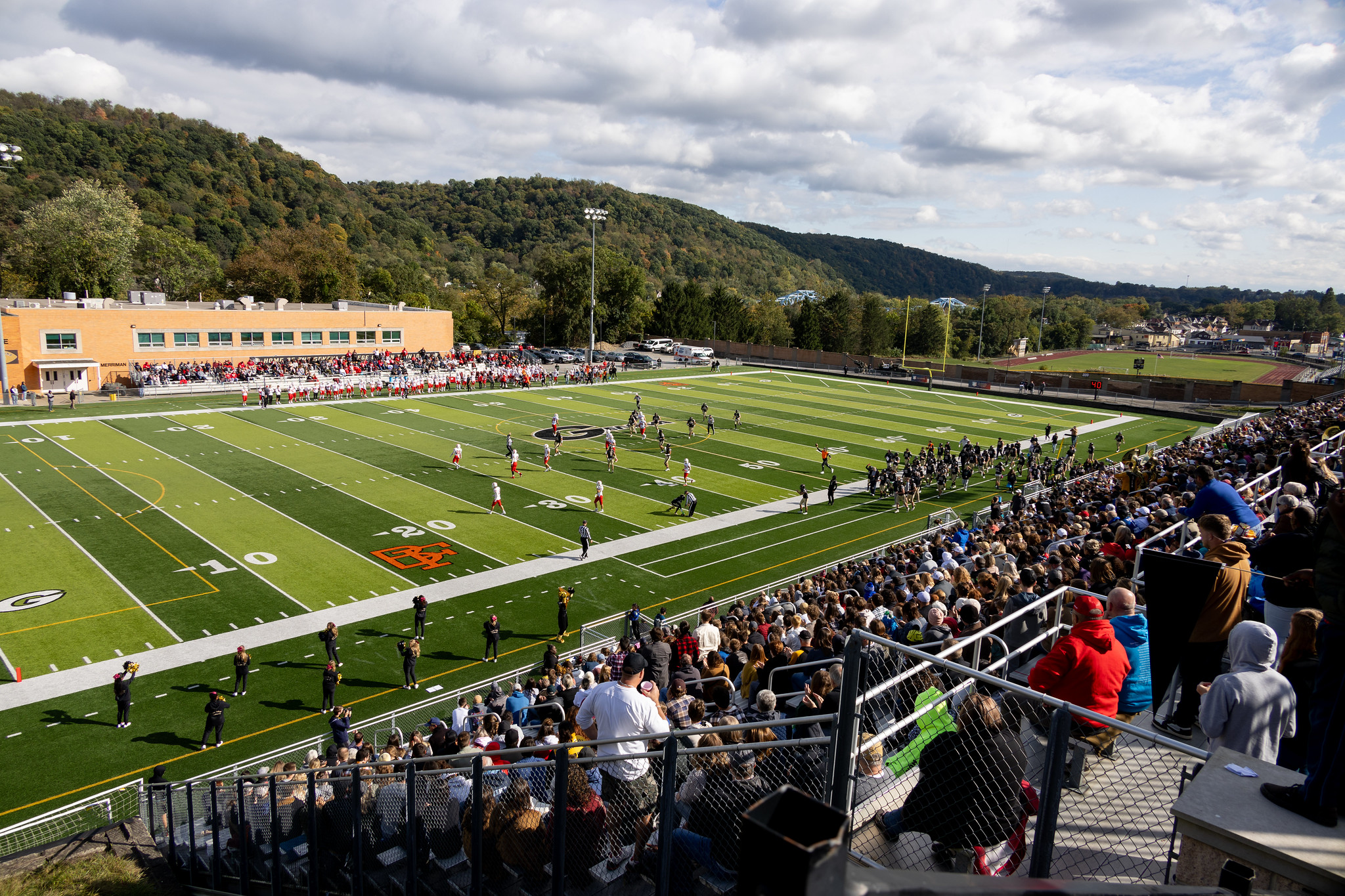
- The stadium during a game in 2023
- Interactive map of Reeves Field
- Address: College Avenue, Beaver Falls, PA; United States
- Owner: Geneva College
- Operator: Geneva College Athletics
- Capacity: 5,500
- Type: Stadium
- Surface: Grass
- Scoreboard: yes
- Current use: American football

Construction
- Opened: 1925; 101 years ago
- Renovated: 2006–2008

Tenants
- Geneva Golden Tornadoes; Beaver Falls Tigers

Website
- athletics.geneva.edu/reeves-field

Reeves Field is a football stadium located on the campus of Geneva College in Beaver Falls, Pennsylvania. It was named in honor of local banker John T. Reeves, whose heirs donated land for the complex.

Constructed in 1925, Reeves Field is one of the oldest sports venues in Pennsylvania. The current seating capacity is 5,500. The stadium hosts the Geneva College Golden Tornadoes and the local high school football team, the Beaver Falls Tigers. Notable football players who played at Reeves include Joe Namath and Cal Hubbard.

The stadium has also hosted the Victory Bowl twice at Geneva, which is a championship football game for the NCCAA. The first game was in 2003 when Geneva defeated North Greenville College and the second in 2007 when Malone College defeated the Golden Tornadoes 45-17. This became Malone's first win in the Victory Bowl. It was also Geneva's first loss, having won the championship in 1998, 1999, 2002, and 2003.

In the fall of 2007, the Golden Tornadoes played their first season as part of the Presidents' Athletic Conference at Reeves.

== Restoration ==
Between 2006 and 2008, Reeves Field was rebuilt, but in several stages. In 2006, a new scoreboard was placed on the embankment below Northwood Hall. The embankment was also redone in order to clear away old brush, and to allow some space to install the field turf. A permanent wall was also placed below the embankment to prevent landslides from going onto the field. On August 21, 2007, during the renovation, the wall collapsed onto the north end of the field. It took several weeks to clean up the field after the mudslide. By 2007, the grass was replaced by turf, and new stands were placed on the visitors' side of the field.

Between December 2007 and September 2008, the largest phase of the project was underway to demolish the old brick wall along old Route 18. By early spring of 2008, the highway was realigned to allow more growth for the campus. A new wall with an iron fence was built to replace the old wall, and a new press box was constructed to allow more game coverage. The new wall covers more than half of what used to be old Route 18. New bleachers were also in place on the home side by the time the Golden Tornadoes played their home opener against Seton Hill University. Restoration work on the stadium was finally completed in October 2008. They Added a New Scoreboard in Fall of 2021

Events and tenants
Preceded by Hubert H. Humphrey Metrodome; Younts Stadium	Host of the Victory Bowl; 2003; 2007	Succeeded by Reynolds Field; Hubert H. Humphrey Metrodome
