= Francis Field (Illinois) =

American football field

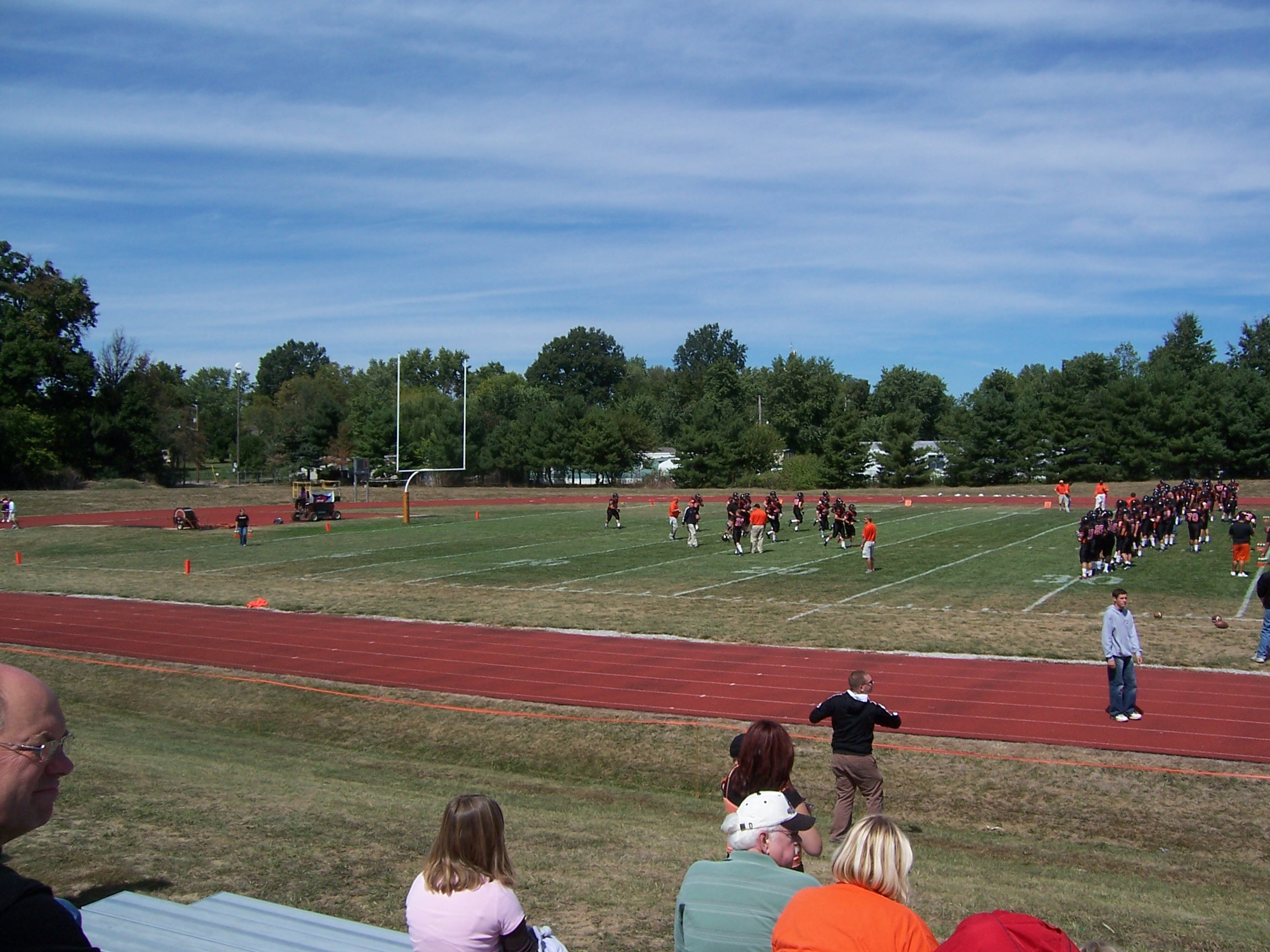
- Francis Field in April 2004
- Interactive map of Francis Field
- Location: Greenville, Illinois
- Coordinates: 38.8815°N 89.4085°W
- Owner: Greenville University
- Operator: Greenville University
- Capacity: 2,000
- Surface: Grass

Construction
- Opened: 1987

Tenant
- Greenville Panthers (NCAA)

Francis Field is a 2,000-seat football field in Greenville, Illinois. It is home to the Greenville University Panthers football team. The facility opened in 1987.

Francis Field has been the host location of the National Christian College Athletic Association Victory Bowl, three times in 2009, in 2012, and in 2019.

Events and tenants
Preceded by Hubert H. Humphrey Metrodome; Finley Stadium	Host of the Victory Bowl; 2009; 2012	Succeeded by Younts Stadium incumbent
