= Duane Christopherson =

American football coach

Biographical details
- Born: November 21, 1930; Vining, Minnesota, U.S.
- Died: October 16, 2003 (aged 72); Fergus Falls, Minnesota, U.S.

Coaching career (HC unless noted)
- 1973: Northwestern (MN)

Head coaching record
- Overall: 1–6

Duane Leighton Christopherson (November 21, 1930 – October 16, 2003) was an American football coach. He was the first head football coach at Northwestern College—now known as the University of Northwestern – St. Paul—in Roseville, Minnesota, serving for one season, in 1973, and compiling a record of 1–6.
