= Waxahachie Independent School District =

School district in Texas, United States

Location
- Waxahachie, Texas United States of America

District information
- Type: Public, independent school district
- Motto: "A district where innovation thrives and growth is limitless"
- Grades: Prekindergarden - 12th grade
- Established: 1864
- Superintendent: Dr. Jerry Hollingsworth
- Governing agency: Texas Education Agency
- NCES District ID: 4844730

Students and staff
- Students: 10,095
- Teachers: 566.8
- Staff: 1,162.8

Other information
- Website: www.wisd.org

The Waxahachie Independent School District is a public school district located in Waxahachie, Texas, a suburban community serving as the county seat for Ellis County, which adjoins Dallas County to the north. Waxahachie ISD is a district of about 8,500 students structured in 17 campuses: 10 elementary school campuses, three junior high campuses, three high school campuses, and one alternative-learning campus.

In 2012-13 and 2013–14, the school district and all campuses received the highest Texas Education Agency accountability rating of "Met Standard." The district's fine arts programs are frequently state recognized in visual arts, band, choir, dance and theatre arts. WISD has been a consistent award winner and is designated as a NAMM Foundation Best Communities for Music Education designation, one of only 376 districts to receive the prestigious award.

The district includes almost all of Waxahachie and parts of Ennis, Midlothian and Pecan Hill.

== Schools and facilities ==
=== High schools ===
- Waxahachie High School (grades 9-12)
- Waxahachie Global High School (grades 9-12) - Opened on August 27, 2007, it is an Early College and a Texas-STEM school emphasizing instruction in science, technology, engineering, and mathematics in a small learning-community environment.
- Waxahachie High School of Choice (grades 9-12)
- Waxahachie Challenge Academy

=== Junior high schools (grades 6-8) ===
- Coleman Junior High
- Finley Junior High
- Howard Junior High

=== Elementary schools (kindergarten - grade 5) ===
- Clift Elementary
- Dunaway Elementary
- Felty Elementary
- Marvin Biomedical Academy
- Northside Elementary
- Ray Elementary
- Shackelford Elementary
- Simpson Elementary
- Wedgeworth Elementary
- Wilemon STEAM Academy

=== Prekindergarten ===
- Turner Prekindergarten Academy
- Marvin Elementary
- Northside Elementary

=== Facilities ===
- Lumpkins Stadium
- Richards Park

== Students ==
=== Academics ===
STAAR - Percentage at Level II Satisfactory Standard or above (sum of all grades tested)
Subject	Waxahachie ISD	Region 10	State of Texas
Reading	79%	74%	73%
Mathematics	83%	77%	76%
Writing	75%	71%	69%
Science	81%	80%	79%
Soc. Studies	77%	80%	77%
All Tests	80%	76%	75%

Students in Waxahachie typically outperform local region and statewide averages on standardized tests. In 2015-2016 State of Texas Assessments of Academic Readiness (STAAR) results, 80% of students in Waxahachie ISD met Level II Satisfactory standards, compared with 76% in Region 10 and 75% in the state of Texas. The average SAT score of the class of 2015 was 1476, and the average ACT score was 22.6.

=== Demographics ===
In the 2015-2016 school year, the school district had a total of 8,107 students, ranging from early childhood education and prekindergarten through grade 12. The class of 2015 included 545 graduates; the annual drop-out rate across grades 9-12 was 2.2%.

As of the 2015-2016 school year, the ethnic distribution of the school district was 49.7% White, 34.8% Hispanic, 11.8% African American, 0.5% Asian, 0.4% American Indian, 0.1% Pacific Islander, and 2.7% from two or more races. Economically disadvantaged students made up 47.1% of the student body.
