= Chub Reynolds =

American football and baseball coach (1931–1990)

Biographical details
- Born: September 10, 1931; Sioux Falls, South Dakota, U.S.
- Died: October 8, 1990 (aged 59); Roseville, Minnesota, U.S.

Playing career

Basketball
- c. 1951: Augustana (SD)

Coaching career (HC unless noted)

Football
- 1970–1979: Bethel (MN)
- 1980–1988: Northwestern (MN) (assistant)
- 1989–1990: Northwestern (MN)

Baseball
- 1980s: Northwestern (MN)

Head coaching record
- Overall: 46–62 (football)

Charles Russell "Chub" Reynolds (September 10, 1931 – October 8, 1990) was an American college football and college baseball coach. He served as the head football coach at Bethel College and Seminary—now known as Bethel University—in Arden Hills, Minnesota from 1970 to 1979 and at Northwestern College—now known as the University of Northwestern – St. Paul—in Roseville, Minnesota from 1988 to 1989, compiling a career college football coaching record of 46–62. In 1980, he became an assistant football and head baseball coach at Northwestern College. Reynolds served as the head football coach for under two seasons—the 1989 season and the 1990 season until his death, just two days after coaching his last game. His coaching record at Northwestern was 10–8.

The school named the football stadium, Reynolds Field, in his honor in 1990.
