= Victory Bowl =

Victory Bowl (defunct)
- NCCAA Victory Bowl
- Location: Various
- Operated: 1997–2022
- Championship affiliation: NCCAA
- Conference tie-ins: None

The Victory Bowl was the annual championship game for football-playing members of the National Christian College Athletic Association. It was contested every season from 1997 through 2022 except for cancellations in 2016 and 2020, in the latter case because of the COVID-19 pandemic.

NCCAA membership is not exclusive, and many of its institutions belong either to the National Collegiate Athletic Association (NCAA) or National Association of Intercollegiate Athletics (NAIA); thus, its top football-playing schools were candidates to participate in the Victory Bowl only if they did not qualify for the NCAA or NAIA playoffs. It was possible for schools from the NCAA and NAIA to meet each other in the game. Such matchups happened ten times.

The 48 participants in the game included 30 members of the NAIA, one member of NCAA Division I-AA (today's FCS), 6 members of Division II, and 11 members of Division III.

The first four Victory Bowls (1997 through 2000) were held at a neutral site, Canton, Ohio. The other games were held at the home field of one of the participating teams, except for the 2013 contest, for which Rome, Georgia, served as a neutral site.

Over the years, the expansion of the postseason brackets of Division II, Division III, and the NAIA reduced the number of eligible teams available to compete in the Victory Bowl. In 2016, the bowl title was awarded by default, when just one available team submitted its qualifications for the game. The last Victory Bowl was in 2022; attempts to schedule the game in 2023 and 2024 were unsuccessful due to a lack of available qualified teams. As of 2025, the NCCAA no longer sponsors football.

In addition to the game, other Victory Bowl activities typically included community service projects that involved players and coaches from both teams.

== History ==
Date	Winning team		Losing team		Stadium
November 29, 1997	Olivet Nazarene (NAIA)	56	MidAmerica Nazarene (NAIA)	42	Fawcett Stadium
November 28, 1998	Geneva (NAIA)	27	Maranatha Baptist Bible (NAIA)	6	Fawcett Stadium
November 27, 1999	Geneva (NAIA)	31	MidAmerica Nazarene (NAIA)	26	Fawcett Stadium
November 18, 2000	Northwestern (MN) (NAIA)	35	Greenville (NCAA DIII)	27	Fawcett Stadium
November 17, 2001	Gardner–Webb (NCAA D I-AA)	54	Trinity International (NAIA)	14	Ernest W. Spangler Stadium
November 22, 2002	Geneva (NAIA)	19	Northwestern (MN) (NAIA)	9	Hubert H. Humphrey Metrodome
November 21, 2003	Geneva (NAIA)	37	North Greenville (NCAA DII)	14	Reeves Field
November 20, 2004	Olivet Nazarene (NAIA)	24	Northwestern (MN) (NAIA)	14	Reynolds Field
November 19, 2005	Olivet Nazarene (NAIA)	29	Northwestern (MN) (NAIA)	13	Ward Field
November 18, 2006	North Greenville (NCAA DII)	56	Malone (NAIA)	28	Younts Stadium
November 17, 2007	Malone (NAIA)	45	Geneva (NCAA DIII)	17	Reeves Field
November 21, 2008	Northwestern (MN) (NCAA DIII)	49	Malone (NAIA)	44	Hubert H. Humphrey Metrodome
November 21, 2009	Geneva (NCAA DIII)	29	Greenville (NCAA DIII)	28	Francis Field
November 20, 2010	North Greenville (NCAA DII)	42	Campbellsville (NAIA)	16	Younts Stadium
November 19, 2011	Campbellsville (NAIA)	21	Greenville (NCAA DIII)	7	Finley Stadium
November 17, 2012	Greenville (NCAA DIII)	28	Northwestern (MN) (NCAA DIII)	27	Francis Field
November 23, 2013	Azusa Pacific (NCAA DII)	67	Greenville (NCAA DIII)	0	Barron Stadium
November 22, 2014	North Greenville (NCAA DII)	42	Shorter (NCAA DII)	16	Barron Stadium
November 21, 2015	SAGU (NAIA)	10	Northwestern (MN) (NCAA DIII)	7	Lumpkins Stadium
December 3, 2016	Warner (NAIA)	-	No opponent (Note: The Victory Bowl was canceled after the NCCAA was unable to find an opponent for Warner; the NCCAA awarded the championship to Warner, by default.)	-	-
November 18, 2017	Campbellsville (NAIA)	41	SAGU (NAIA)	28	Finley Stadium
November 30, 2018	Olivet Nazarene (NAIA)	38	Ottawa–Arizona (NAIA)	35	Spirit Field
November 23, 2019	Olivet Nazarene (NAIA)	69	Greenville (NCAA DIII)	8	Francis Field
2020	Canceled due to the COVID-19 pandemic				None
November 20, 2021	SAGU (NAIA)	31	Sterling (NAIA)	14	Lumpkins Stadium
November 18, 2022	Olivet Nazarene (NAIA)	21	SAGU (NAIA)	16	Lumpkins Stadium
2023	Canceled due to lack of qualifying teams				None
2024	Canceled due to lack of qualifying teams				None
