= Lumpkins Stadium =

American football stadium in Waxahachie, Texas

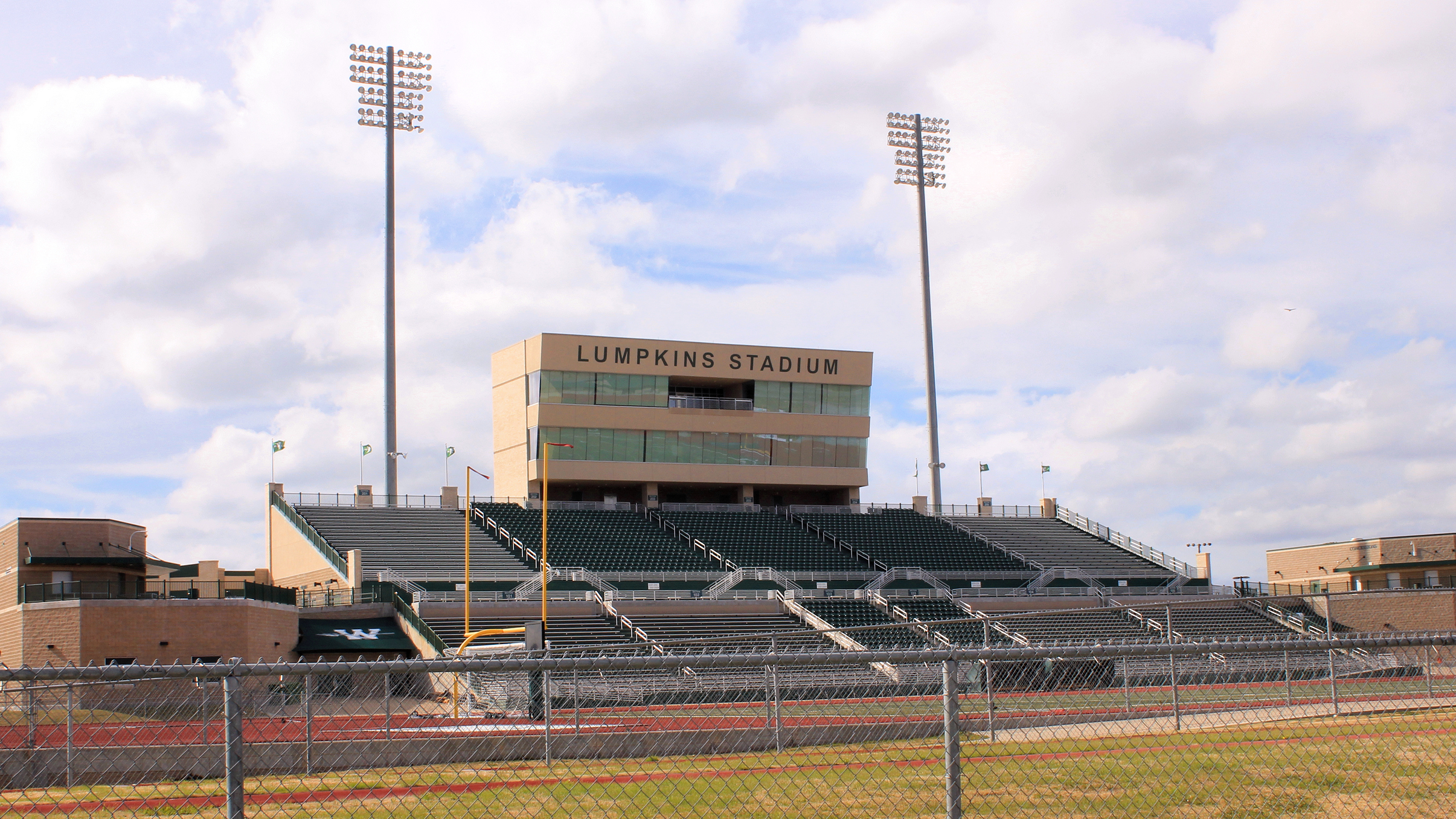
- Interactive map of Lumpkins Stadium
- Location: Waxahachie, Texas
- Coordinates: 32.4138°N 96.8346°W
- Owner: Waxahachie Independent School District
- Operator: Waxahachie Independent School District
- Capacity: 9,500
- Surface: Turf

Construction
- Opened: 1972
- Renovated: 2011

Tenants
- Waxahachie Indians (WISD); Nelson Lions (NAIA)

Lumpkins Stadium is a stadium in Waxahachie, Texas. It is primarily used for American football, and is the home field of the Waxahachie Indians. The stadium is named for Stuart B. Lumpkins, a former superintendent of Waxahachie Independent School District. In 2011, the stadium received renovations that were funded through a city bond. In addition to serving as the home field for the Waxahachie Indians football team, Lumpkins also hosts Waxahachie Indian soccer and an annual track and field meet. The stadium has also been used as a neutral site for University Interscholastic League playoff games in both football and soccer. Nelson University also holds its home football games at the stadium.
