= Waxahachie High School =

Location
- 3001 Hwy 287; Waxahachie, Texas 75167; United States; 32.42800675864216°N 96.89481874603202°W

Information
- School type: Public high school
- Established: 1864
- School district: Waxahachie Independent School District
- Principal: Jacob Perry
- Staff: 194.02 (FTE)
- Grades: 9–12
- Enrollment: 3,056 (2024–2025)
- Student to teacher ratio: 15.75
- Campus type: Suburban
- Colors: Green & White
- Athletics conference: UIL Class 6A
- Mascot: Indian/Lady Indian
- Rival: Ennis High School
- Website: WHS official website

Waxahachie High School is a public high school in the city of Waxahachie, Texas, United States and classified as a 6A school by the University Interscholastic League (UIL). It is a part of the Waxahachie Independent School District located in central Ellis County. In 2015, the school was rated "Met Standard" by the Texas Education Agency.

The district includes Waxahachie and portions of Midlothian and Pecan Hill.

== Academics ==
Waxahachie High School offers Advanced Placement (AP) in biology, calculus, chemistry, computer science, English language composition, English literature, environmental science, French language, macroeconomics, Spanish language, Spanish literature, statistics, U.S. government, Human Geography, world history, and U.S. history. As well as offering Advanced Placement classes, they offer Dual Credit classes in collaboration with the local community college, Navarro College. As of 2013, Waxahachie High School offers American Sign Language as an optional language class.

== Athletics ==
The Waxahachie Indians compete in UIL-sanctioned sports including volleyball, cross country, football, basketball, powerlifting, swimming, soccer, golf, tennis, track, baseball, softball, and marching band.

In 1992, the varsity football team won the 4A state championship. The football team plays their home games at Lumpkins Stadium.

The school's baseball team won the 3A state championship in 1965. The boys basketball team won the 3A state championship in 1958 and the 4A state championship in 1983. The girls basketball team won the 4A state championship in 2006.

== Extracurricular activities ==
Waxahachie High School has extracurricular activities such as band, choir, and theater. Waxahachie High School also offers several CTSOs to its students including FFA, Skills USA and TSA. Other organizations on campus include DI, Interact, and NHS.

=== Band ===
The Spirit of Waxahachie Indian Band is the largest organization on campus, with 250 members. For over 20 years, the band has received numerous awards both locally and around the nation, having been a consistent UIL State Marching Contest finalist and 5A bronze medalist in 2017. The band is also a consistent Bands of America regional finalist and performed at the 2000 Macy's Thanksgiving Day Parade. The band has also been named a finalist for Phi Beta Mu's Earl D. Irons Program of Distinction Award.

In concert literature, the Waxahachie High School Wind Ensemble was named the 2011 Texas Music Educators Association (TMEA) 4A Honor Band and performed at the association's 2012 convention. The Foundation for Music Education (TFME) named the ensemble a Class 4A "Commended Winner" in 2013 and a "National Winner" in 2014 in the Mark of Excellence Wind Band Awards. The Wind Ensemble was named the 2017 TMEA 5A Honor Band, performing at the 2018 convention. The Jazz Orchestra was named the 2018 TMEA Invited Jazz Ensemble, performing at the 2019 TMEA convention in San Antonio, TX, and performed at the 2019 Midwest Clinic in Chicago.

== Notable alumni ==
- Keith Abney II, NFL player and former college football cornerback for the Arizona State Sun Devils
- Alex Bhore, musician, drummer for This Will Destroy You
- Ronnie Dawson, rockabilly band leader
- Qua Grant, basketball player in the Israeli Basketball Premier League
- LaDarius Henderson, NFL offensive guard for the Indianapolis Colts
- Preston Hodge, college football cornerback for the Colorado Buffaloes
- Clay Jenkins, politician
- Desmond Mason, former NBA player (2001 Slam Dunk Contest Champion)
- Montae Reagor, former NFL player
- Jalen Reagor, NFL player
- Paul Richards, former MLB player/manager
- Demani Richardson, NFL player and former college football player
- Aldrick Robinson, former NFL player
- Broderick Sargent, former NFL player
- Jared Thomas, baseball player
- Brian Waters, former NFL player
- John Wray, former Texas state representative for Ellis County and former mayor of Waxahachie
