= Ward Field (Bourbonnais) =

Stadium in Bourbonnais, Illinois, U.S.

- Interactive map of Ward Field
- Location: Bourbonnais, Illinois
- Coordinates: 41.1542028°N 87.869854°W
- Owner: Olivet Nazarene University
- Operator: Olivet Nazarene University
- Capacity: 2,500
- Surface: Artificial turf

Tenant
- Olivet Nazarene University Tigers (NAIA)

Ward Field is a 2,500-seat stadium in Bourbonnais, Illinois. It is home to the Olivet Nazarene University Tigers football team. Since 2002, Ward Field has hosted the Chicago Bears training camp.

Events and tenants
| Preceded by Ralph E. Davis Pioneer Stadium | Host of the Chicago Bears training camp 2002 – present | Succeeded by present |
| Preceded by Reynolds Field | Host of the Victory Bowl; 2005 | Succeeded by Younts Stadium |
