= Kirk Talley (American football) =

American football player and coach (born 1959)

Biographical details
- Born: November 14, 1959 (age 66); Pittsburgh, Pennsylvania, U.S.
- Education: Pacific Lutheran University, BA; Miami University, MA

Playing career
- 1979–1980: Golden Valley Lutheran
- 1981–1982: Pacific Lutheran

Coaching career (HC unless noted)
- 1983–1984: Bethel (MN) (DL)
- 1985: Northern State (GA/RB)
- 1986: Miami (OH) (GA)
- 1987: Anoka-Ramsey CC (OC)
- 1988–1989: Mount Senario
- 1990–1991: Oklahoma Panhandle State (OL/DB)
- 1992–1995: Taylor (OL/DB)
- 1996–1997: Greenville
- 1998–2000: Crown (MN)
- 2001–2016: Northwestern (MN)
- 2017–2018: Warner (DC)
- 2019–2021: Warner

Head coaching record
- Overall: 136–110–1
- Bowls: 1–5
- Tournaments: 0–1 (NCAA D-III playoffs)

Accomplishments and honors

Championships
- 8 UMAC - 1989, 2001, 2002, 2005, 2007, 2008, 2012, 2016

Kirk Talley (born November 14, 1959) is an American college football coach. He is the former head football coach at Warner University in Lake Wales, Florida. Talley served as the head football coach at the University of Northwestern – St. Paul in Roseville, Minnesota from 2001 to 2016 where he left as the winningest coach in school history. He has the distinction of being the head coach at four different Upper Midwest Athletic Conference (UMAC) institutions: Mount Senario College, Greenville University, Crown College in St. Bonifacius, Minnesota, and at the University of Northwestern – St. Paul.

Talley played high school football and ran track at J.F. Kennedy in Bloomington, MN. He played college football at Golden Valley Lutheran College for two years, under Dave Skrien and transferred to Pacific Lutheran University to play under College Hall of Fame member and head coach Frosty Westering and then obtained his master's degree from Miami University OH as a graduate assistant under Tim Rose. He studied under Dr. Colleen Hacker, mental performance coach and professor at PLU as well as Dr. Robin Vealey, professor, at Miami.

== Head coaching record ==
| Year | Team | Overall | Conference | Standing | Bowl/playoffs |
|---|---|---|---|---|---|
Mount Senario Fighting Saints (Upper Midwest Athletic Conference) (1988–1989)
| 1988 | Mount Senario | 3–5 | 3–2 | | |
| 1989 | Mount Senario | 5–3–1 | 5–0 | 1st | |
| Mount Senario: | | 8–8–1 | 8–2 | | |
Greenville Panthers (Illini–Badger Football Conference) (1996–1997)
| 1996 | Greenville | 2–7 | 1–4 | 5th | |
| 1997 | Greenville | 2–8 | 0–5 | 6th | |
| Greenville: | | 4–15 | 1–9 | | |
Crown Storm (Upper Midwest Athletic Conference) (1998–2000)
| 1998 | Crown | 1–7 | 1-5 | | |
| 1999 | Crown | 0–9 | 0-5 | | |
| 2000 | Crown | 4–5 | 3-3 | | |
| Crown: | | 5–21 | 4-13 | | |
Northwestern Eagles (Upper Midwest Athletic Conference) (2001–2016)
| 2001 | Northwestern | 9–0 | 6–0 | 1st | |
| 2002 | Northwestern | 8–2 | 4–0 | 1st (North) | L Victory |
| 2003 | Northwestern | 6–4 | 5–2 | T–1st (North) | |
| 2004 | Northwestern | 6–5 | 6–1 | T–1st (North) | L Victory |
| 2005 | Northwestern | 8–3 | 7–0 | 1st (North) | L Victory |
| 2006 | Northwestern | 7–3 | 6–1 | 2nd (North) | |
| 2007 | Northwestern | 8–2 | 6–0 | 1st | |
| 2008 | Northwestern | 9–2 | 4–0 | 1st | W Victory |
| 2009 | Northwestern | 5–5 | 3–1 | 2nd (North) | |
| 2010 | Northwestern | 1–8 | 1–5 | T–7th | |
| 2011 | Northwestern | 6–4 | 6–3 | 4th | |
| 2012 | Northwestern | 8–3 | 7–1 | T–1st | L Victory |
| 2013 | Northwestern | 6–4 | 6–3 | 4th | |
| 2014 | Northwestern | 8–2 | 7–2 | T–2nd | |
| 2015 | Northwestern | 8–3 | 8–1 | 2nd | L Victory |
| 2016 | Northwestern | 9–2 | 8–1 | 1st | L NCAA Division III First Round |
| Northwestern: | | 112–52 | 90–21 | | |
Warner Royals (Mid-South Conference) (2019–2021)
| 2019 | Warner | 3–7 | 2–4 | T–4th (Sun) | |
| 2020–21 | Warner | 2–4 | 1–3 | T–5th (Sun) | |
| 2021 | Warner | 2–3 | 0–1 | | |
| Warner: | | 7–14 | 3–8 | | |
| Total: | | 136–110-1 | | | |
National championship Conference title Conference division title or championship game berth
