= Jimmy Miller (American football) =

American football coach (born 1959)

Current position
- Title: Special assistant to the head coach
- Team: Northwestern (MN)
- Conference: UMAC

Biographical details
- Born: c. 1959 (age 66–67); Auburn, Washington, U.S.

Playing career
- 1977: Mt. Hood
- 1980: Rocky Mountain
- 1981–1982: Bethel (MN)
- Position: Defensive back

Coaching career (HC unless noted)
- 1983: Bethel (MN) (LB)
- 1987–1990: Sioux Falls (DC)
- 1991–2000: Northwestern (MN)
- 2001–2015: Bethel (MN) (DC/DB)
- 2016–2017: Bethel (MN) (assoc. HC/DL)
- 2018–present: Northwestern (MN) (spec. assistant to the HC)

Head coaching record
- Overall: 46–50

James Miller (born c. 1959) is an American college football coach. He is the special assistant to the head coach for the University of Northwestern – St. Paul, a position he has held since 2018. He was the head football coach for University of Northwestern – St. Paul from 1991 to 2000. He also coached for Bethel (MN) and Sioux Falls. He played college football for Mt. Hood, Rocky Mountain, and Bethel (MN) as a defensive back.

== Head coaching record ==
| Year | Team | Overall | Conference | Standing | Bowl/playoffs |
|---|---|---|---|---|---|
Northwestern Eagles (NAIA Division II independent) (1991–1994)
| 1991 | Northwestern | 3–6 | | | |
| 1992 | Northwestern | 3–7 | | | |
| 1993 | Northwestern | 4–6 | | | |
| 1994 | Northwestern | 6–3 | | | |
Northwestern Eagles (Upper Midwest Athletic Conference) (1995–2000)
| 1995 | Northwestern | 7–2 | 4–1 | | |
| 1996 | Northwestern | 3–6 | 1–4 | | |
| 1997 | Northwestern | 5–5 | 2–3 | | |
| 1998 | Northwestern | 4–6 | 3–3 | | |
| 1999 | Northwestern | 3–7 | 2–3 | | |
| 2000 | Northwestern | 8–2 | 5–1 | | |
| Northwestern: | | 46–50 | 17–15 | | |
| Total: | | 46–50 | | | |

== Exterternal links ==
- Northwestern (MN) profile
- Bethel (MN) profile
