= Reynolds Field (Northwestern) =

Multi-purpose stadium in Roseville, Minnesota

- Interactive map of Reynolds Field
- Location: Roseville, Minnesota
- Coordinates: 45°1′56″N 93°10′12″W
- Owner: University of Northwestern – St. Paul
- Operator: University of Northwestern – St. Paul
- Capacity: 1,500
- Surface: Turf

Construction
- Opened: 1990; 2014

Tenants
- Northwestern Eagles (NCAA); Salvo SC (WPSL) (2019–present)

Reynolds Field is a 1,500-seat multi-purpose stadium in Roseville, Minnesota, United States. It is home to the University of Northwestern – St. Paul Eagles. The facility was dedicated in honor of long-time coach Chub Reynolds in September 1990. The stadium was rebuilt in 2014.

Events and tenants
Preceded by Reeves Field	Host of the Victory Bowl; 2004	Succeeded by Ward Field
