= Waxahachie, Texas =

- City
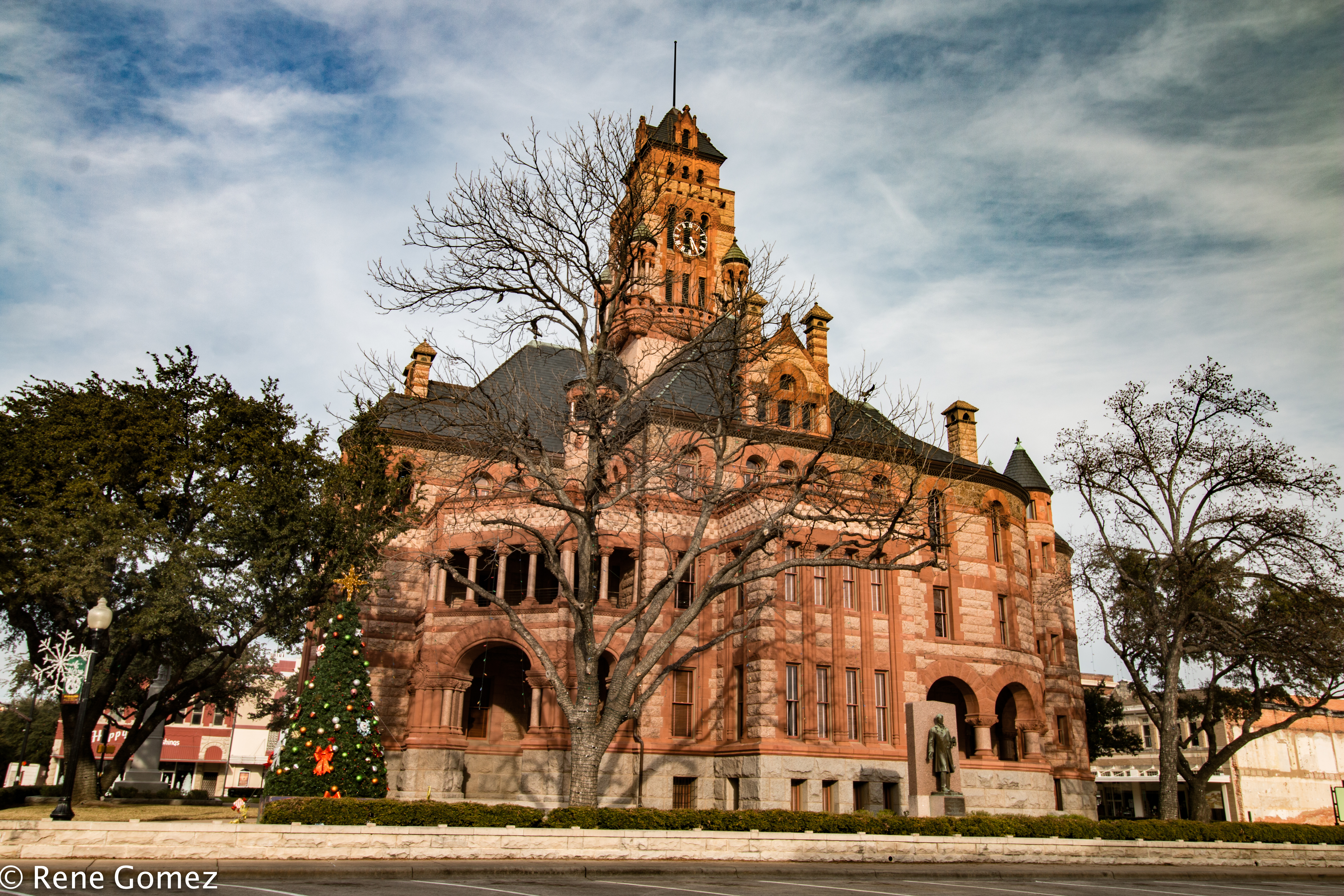
- The Ellis County Courthouse in Waxahachie
- Nickname: The Crape Myrtle Capital of Texas
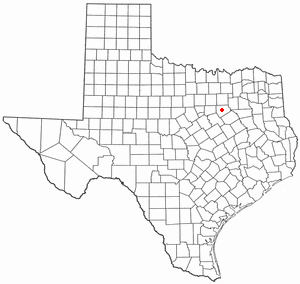
- Location of Waxahachie, Texas

- Coordinates: 32°23′30″N 96°50′40″W
- Country: United States
- State: Texas
- County: Ellis
- Founded: 1850

Government
  - Type: Council-manager
  - City Council: Mayor Melany Contreras; Mayor Pro Tem Chris Wright; Patrick Souter; Travis Smith; Tres Atkins
  - City Manager: Ana Hernandez

Area
  - Total: 50.73 sq mi (131.40 km^{2})
  - Land: 49.50 sq mi (128.21 km^{2})
  - Water: 1.23 sq mi (3.19 km^{2})
- Elevation: 623 ft (190 m)

Population (2020)
  - Total: 41,140
  - Estimate (2025): 50,504
  - Density: 767.4/sq mi (296.31/km^{2})
- Demonym: Waxahachian
- Time zone: UTC−6 (Central (CST))
  - Summer (DST): UTC−5 (CDT)
- ZIP Codes: 75165, 75167, 75168
- Area codes: 214, 469, 945, 972
- FIPS code: 48-76816
- GNIS feature ID: 2412196
- Website: www.waxahachietx.gov

Waxahachie (/ˌwɒksəˈhætʃi/ WOK-sə-HATCH-ee) an exurb south of Dallas, is a city in and the county seat of Ellis County, Texas, United States. Its population was 41,140 in 2020. The city was founded in 1850, and incorporated in 1871. Much of the employment is provided by a number of industries and by educational institutions, including primary and secondary schools, a community college and a private university. In the mid-1980s, the city became a filming location for a number of movies and occasional episodes of television series.

== Etymology ==
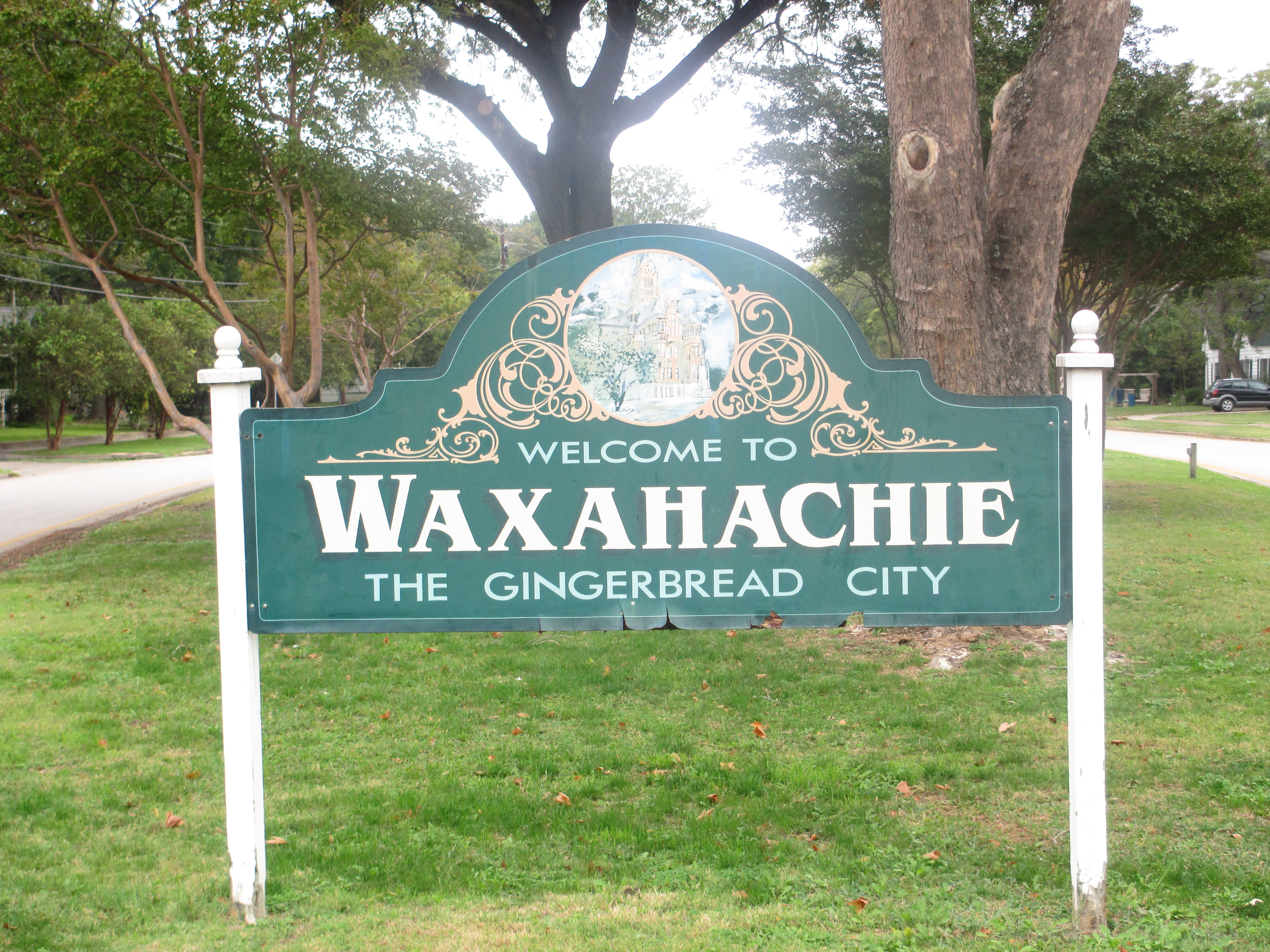
Waxahachie welcome sign

Some sources state that the name means "cow" or "buffalo" in an unspecified Native American language. One possible Native American origin is the Alabama language, originally spoken in the area of Alabama around Waxahatchee Creek by the Alabama-Coushatta people, who had migrated by the 1850s to eastern Texas. In the Alabama language, waakasi hachi means "calf's tail" (the Alabama word waaka being a loan from Spanish vaca).

A Waxahatchee Creek near present-day Shelby, Alabama, suggests that Waxahachie shares the same etymology. Many place names in Texas and Oklahoma have their origins in the Southeastern United States, largely due to forced removal of various southeastern Indian tribes. The area in central Alabama that includes Waxahatchee Creek was for hundreds of years the home of the Upper Creek moiety of the Muscogee Creek Nation. Again, this would suggest a Muscogee Creek-language origin of Waxahachie. "Waxahachie", therefore, may be an anglicized pronunciation of the Muscogee compound word wakvhvce from the Muscogee words wakv (meaning "cow" derived from the Spanish vaca) and the Muscogee word hvcce (meaning "river" or "creek").

== History ==
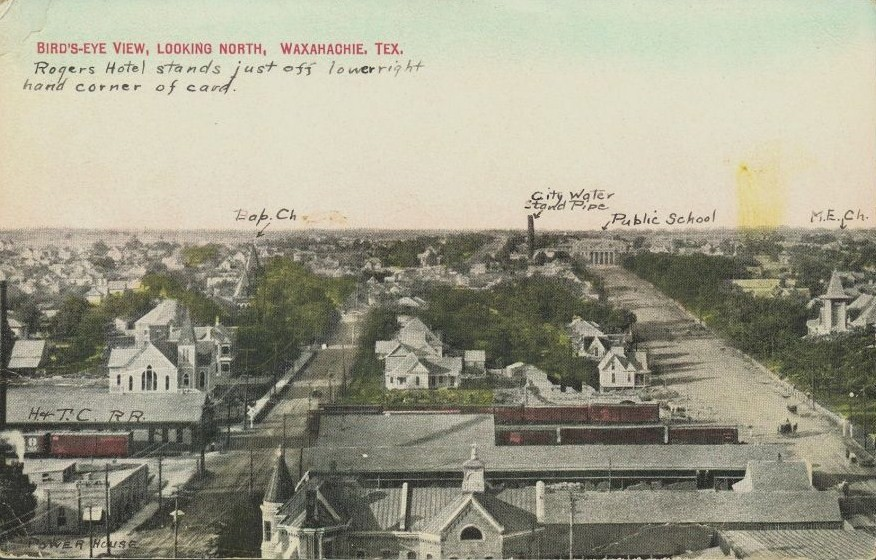
Aerial view of Waxahachie, looking north, c. 1908

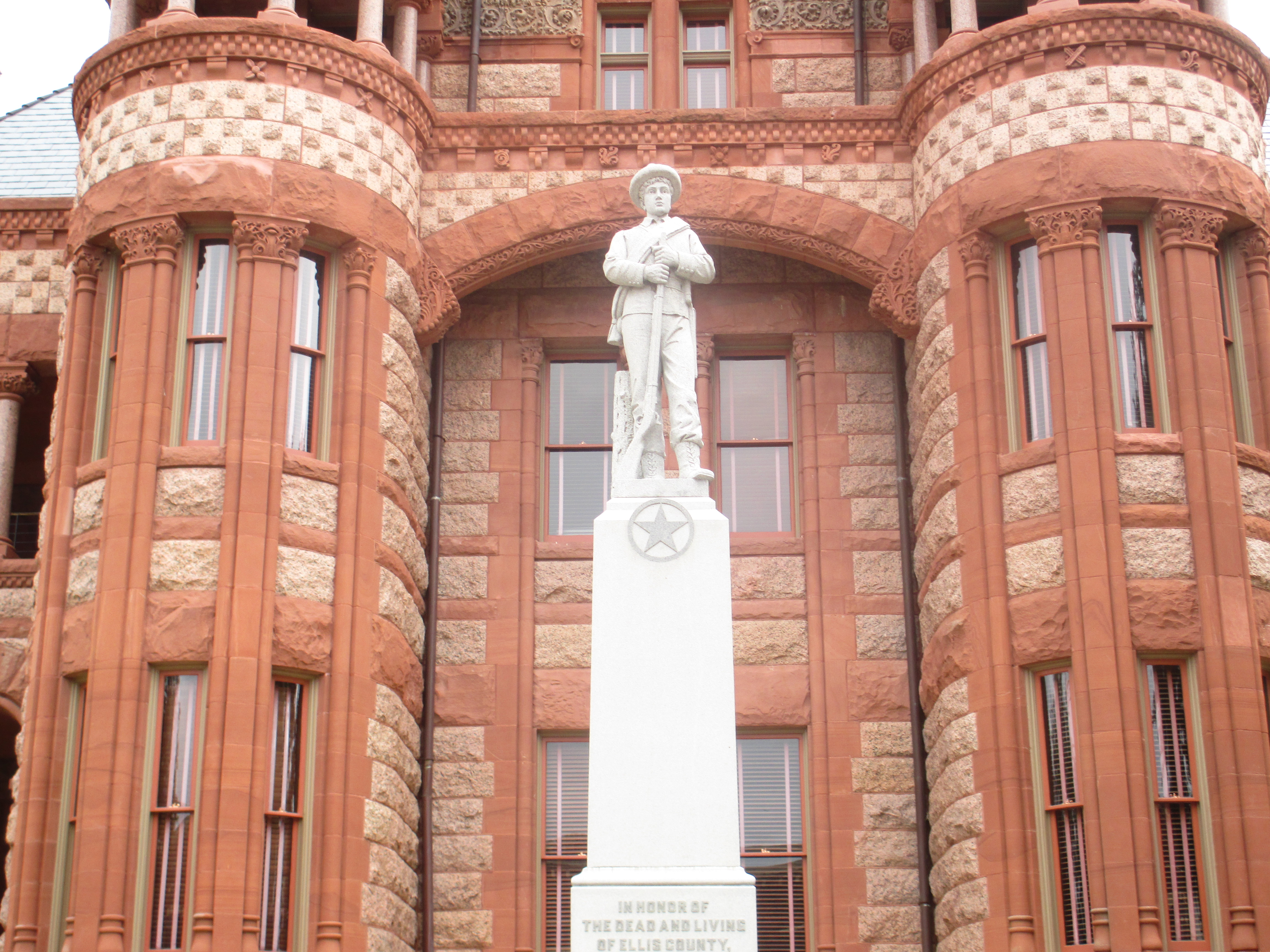
The United Daughters of the Confederacy Monument was unveiled in 1912 at the Ellis County Courthouse in Waxahachie.

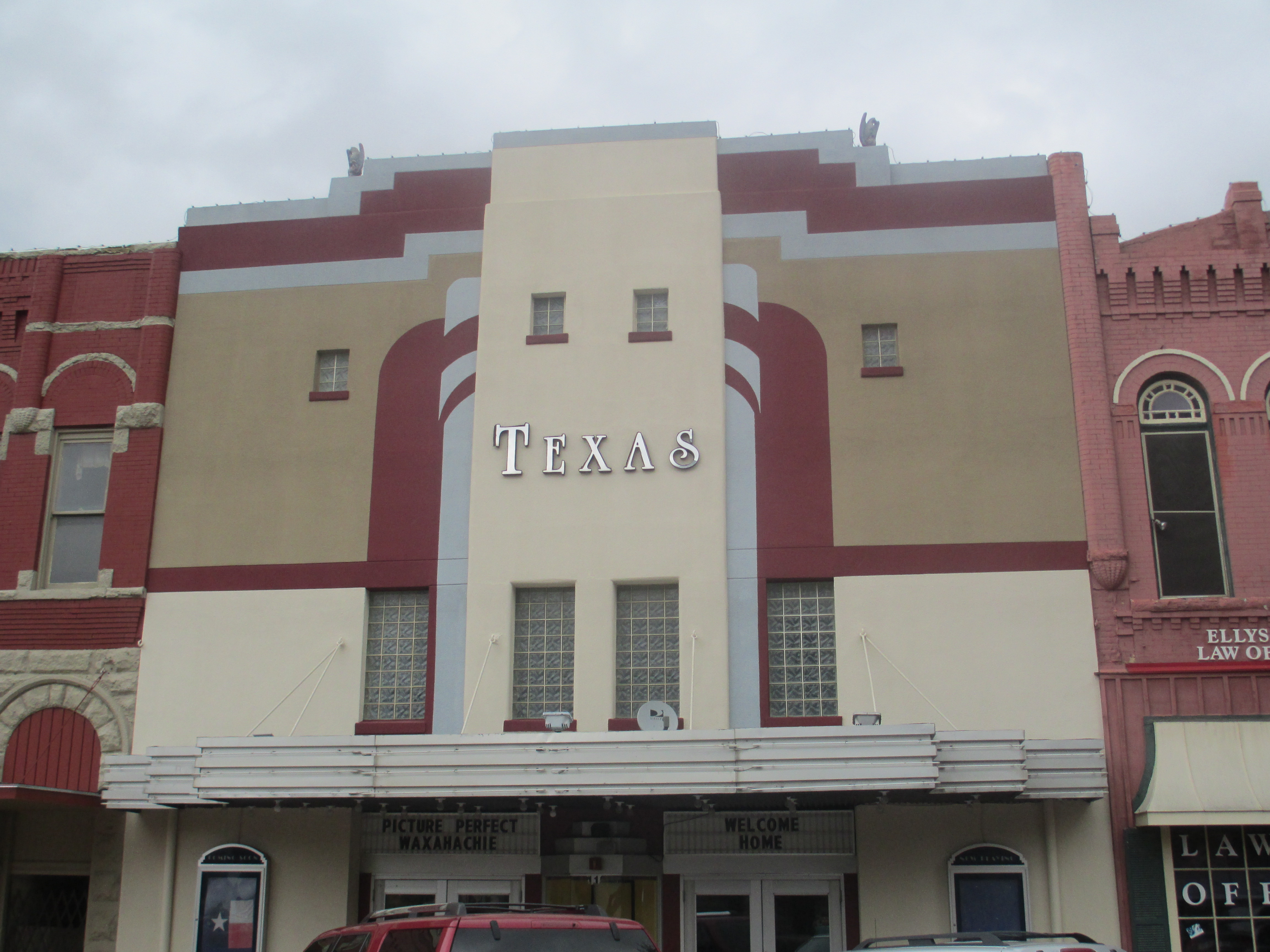
The Texas Theater, across from the courthouse, hosts community events in Waxahachie.

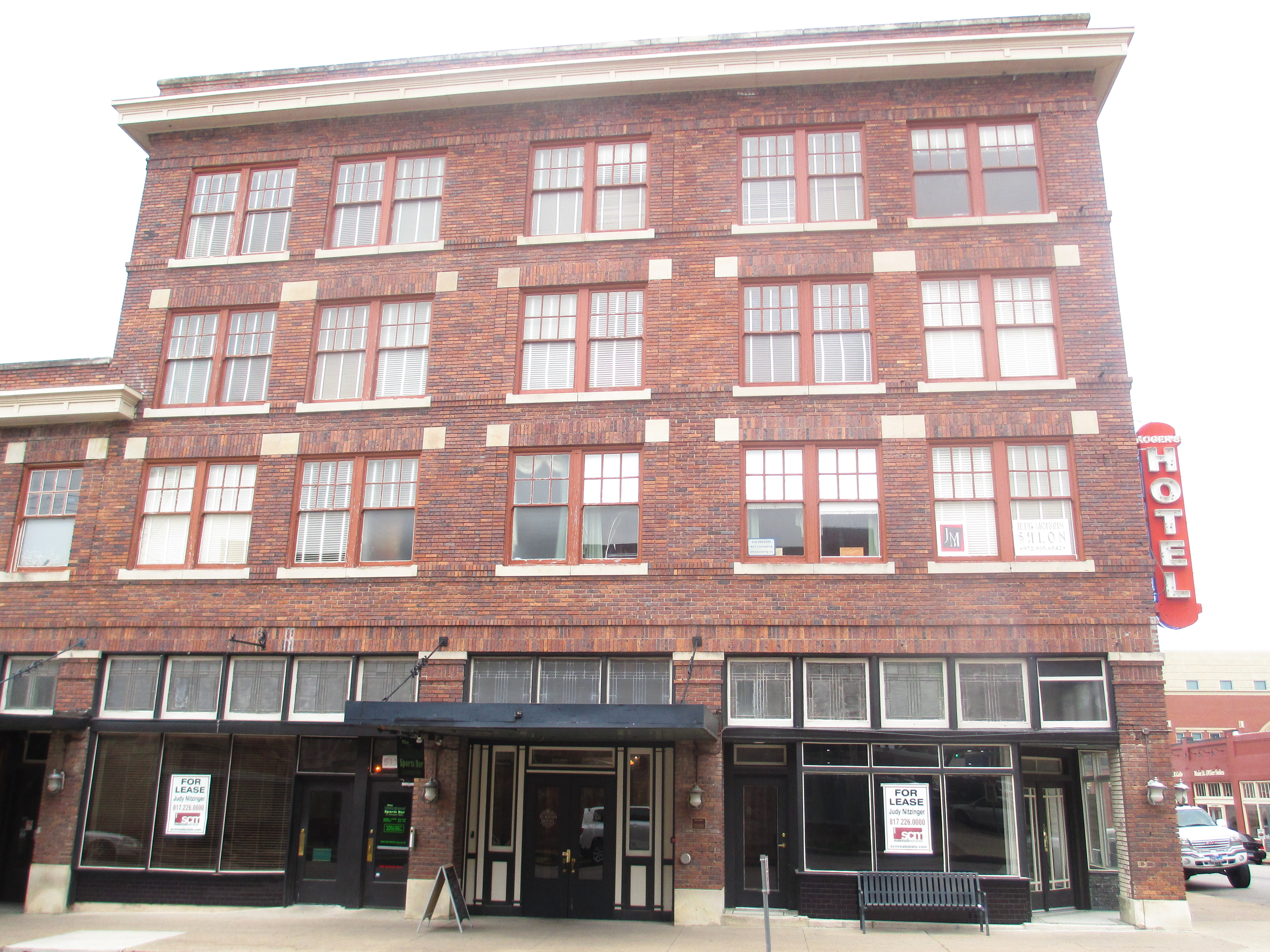
The historic Rogers Hotel, adjacent to the Ellis County courthouse in downtown Waxahachie

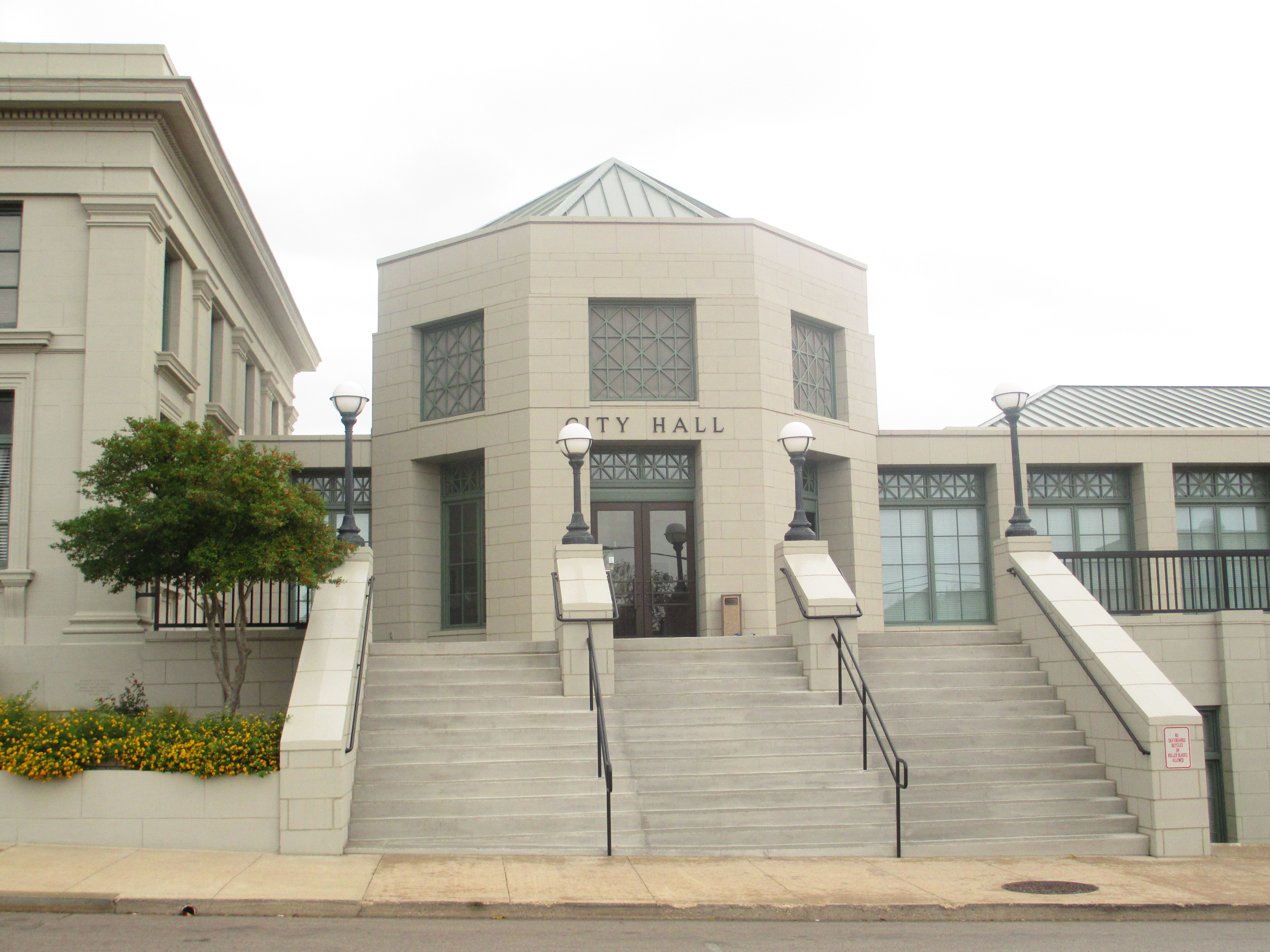
Waxahachie City Hall

Waxahachie was founded in August 1850 as the seat of the newly established Ellis County on a tract of land donated by early settler Emory W. Rogers, a native of Lawrence County, Alabama, who migrated to Texas in 1839. It was incorporated on April 28, 1871, and in 1875, the state legislature granted investors the right to operate a rail line from Waxahachie Tap Railroad to Garrett, Texas, which greatly increased the population of Waxahachie.

From 1902 to 1942, Waxahachie was the second home of Trinity University, which was a Presbyterian-affiliated institution founded in 1869. Then-Trinity's main administration and classroom building is today the Farmer Administration Building of Nelson University. Trinity's present-day location is in San Antonio.

The town is the namesake of the former United States Naval Ship Waxahachie (YTB-814).

In 1988, the area around Waxahachie was chosen as the site for the Superconducting Super Collider, which was to be the world's largest and most energetic particle accelerator, with a planned ring circumference of 54.1 miles (87.1 km). Seventeen shafts were sunk and 14.6 miles (23.5 km) of tunnel were bored before the project was cancelled by Congress in 1993.

In 2020, County Judge Todd Little came into the national spotlight when the county's only elected African American, Constable Curtis Polk, Jr., protested having his office located in the basement of the courthouse next to a segregation-era sign that read "Negroes". The controversy was resolved amicably when Little worked with Polk to relocate him to another office.

== Geography ==
=== Climate ===
The climate in this area is characterized by hot, humid summers and generally mild to cool winters. According to the Köppen climate classification, Waxahachie has a humid subtropical climate, Cfa on climate maps.

Climate data for Waxahachie, Texas (1991–2020)
Month	Jan	Feb	Mar	Apr	May	Jun	Jul	Aug	Sep	Oct	Nov	Dec	Year
Mean daily maximum °F (°C)	56.5 (13.6)	60.0 (15.6)	67.4 (19.7)	75.3 (24.1)	82.3 (27.9)	90.4 (32.4)	94.7 (34.8)	95.3 (35.2)	88.4 (31.3)	78.3 (25.7)	66.3 (19.1)	57.7 (14.3)	76.1 (24.5)
Daily mean °F (°C)	45.2 (7.3)	48.8 (9.3)	56.2 (13.4)	64.1 (17.8)	72.6 (22.6)	80.6 (27.0)	84.3 (29.1)	84.5 (29.2)	77.6 (25.3)	66.7 (19.3)	55.3 (12.9)	46.9 (8.3)	65.2 (18.5)
Mean daily minimum °F (°C)	33.9 (1.1)	37.5 (3.1)	44.9 (7.2)	52.8 (11.6)	62.9 (17.2)	70.8 (21.6)	73.9 (23.3)	73.7 (23.2)	66.8 (19.3)	55.0 (12.8)	44.3 (6.8)	36.1 (2.3)	54.4 (12.5)
Average precipitation inches (mm)	2.61 (66)	2.72 (69)	3.99 (101)	3.48 (88)	4.31 (109)	4.22 (107)	2.48 (63)	2.91 (74)	3.27 (83)	4.73 (120)	2.93 (74)	3.15 (80)	40.8 (1,034)
Average snowfall inches (cm)	0.0 (0.0)	0.0 (0.0)	0.0 (0.0)	0.0 (0.0)	0.0 (0.0)	0.0 (0.0)	0.0 (0.0)	0.0 (0.0)	0.0 (0.0)	0.0 (0.0)	0.0 (0.0)	0.0 (0.0)	0 (0)
Source: NOAA

== Demographics ==
Historical population
Census	Pop.	Note	%±
1880	1,354		—
1890	3,076		127.2%
1900	4,215		37.0%
1910	6,205		47.2%
1920	7,958		28.3%
1930	8,042		1.1%
1940	8,655		7.6%
1950	11,204		29.5%
1960	12,749		13.8%
1970	13,452		5.5%
1980	14,624		8.7%
1990	18,168		24.2%
2000	21,426		17.9%
2010	29,621		38.2%
2020	41,140		38.9%
2024 (est.)	48,617		18.2%
U.S. Decennial Census

=== 2020 census ===
As of the 2020 census, Waxahachie had a population of 41,140. The census counted 14,596 households and 9,073 families, and the median age was 34.1 years. 26.9% of residents were under the age of 18 and 13.6% of residents were 65 years of age or older. For every 100 females there were 91.6 males, and for every 100 females age 18 and over there were 87.8 males age 18 and over.

93.2% of residents lived in urban areas, while 6.8% lived in rural areas.

There were 14,596 households in Waxahachie, of which 38.5% had children under the age of 18 living in them. Of all households, 50.8% were married-couple households, 14.3% were households with a male householder and no spouse or partner present, and 28.9% were households with a female householder and no spouse or partner present. About 22.9% of all households were made up of individuals and 9.8% had someone living alone who was 65 years of age or older.

There were 15,645 housing units, of which 6.7% were vacant. The homeowner vacancy rate was 2.0% and the rental vacancy rate was 8.6%.

Racial composition as of the 2020 census
Race	Number	Percent
White	24,955	60.7%
Black or African American	6,025	14.6%
American Indian and Alaska Native	324	0.8%
Asian	361	0.9%
Native Hawaiian and Other Pacific Islander	55	0.1%
Some other race	3,505	8.5%
Two or more races	5,915	14.4%
Hispanic or Latino (of any race)	10,675	25.9%

Waxahachie racial composition as of 2020 (NH = Non-Hispanic) (Note: Note: the US Census treats Hispanic/Latino as an ethnic category. This table excludes Latinos from the racial categories and assigns them to a separate category. Hispanics/Latinos can be of any race.)
Race	Number	Percentage
White (NH)	22,174	53.9%
Black or African American (NH)	5,861	14.25%
Native American or Alaska Native (NH)	153	0.37%
Asian (NH)	353	0.86%
Pacific Islander (NH)	52	0.13%
Some Other Race (NH)	314	0.76%
Multiracial (NH)	1,558	3.79%
Hispanic or Latino	10,675	25.95%
Total	41,140	

== Economy ==
Employment opportunities in the city are highly oriented toward industry. Owens Corning, Georgia-Pacific, International Paper, James Hardie Industries, Berry Global, Americase, Cardinal Glass, Magnablend, and Dart Container are located within a few miles of each other. Nonindustrial employers include Baylor Scott & White Health, Waxahachie Independent School District, Walgreens Distribution Center, Walmart, H-E-B, Navarro College, and Nelson University.

== Arts and culture ==
=== Annual cultural events ===
The Scarborough Renaissance Festival (also called Scarborough Faire) is located southwest of the town. It opens annually during April and May, and has been in operation since 1981. The Scarborough grounds are also home to Screams Halloween Theme Park in October.

The city's annual Gingerbread Trail Festival features tours of many of the Gingerbread homes.

The Crossroads of Texas Festival, featuring artists, craftsmen, music, and food from around Texas, takes place in downtown on the last Saturday in October. The festival was known as the Texas Country Reporter Festival from 1996 to 2023.

Bethlehem Revisited, a re-enactment of the birth of Jesus, occurs behind Central Presbyterian Church in early December.

OddFest, a local arts, food, crafts, and music exhibition supported by the local OddFellows chapter.

=== Tourism ===
Waxahachie is locally known for its elaborate Richardsonian Romanesque courthouse. The town also features many examples of Victorian architecture and Gingerbread-style homes, several of which have been converted into bed and breakfast inns. The Ellis County Art Association hosts ART on the Square (Cultural Attractions- Events and Facilities; 113 West Franklin Street).

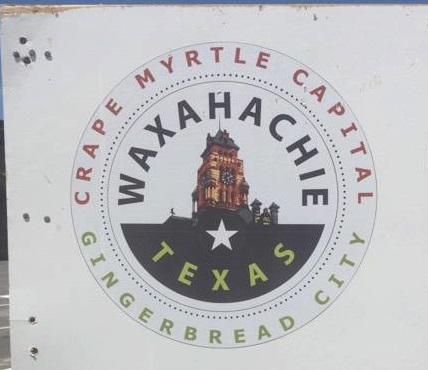
Waxahachie "Gingerbread City" sign

=== Local Art ===
Waxahachie is home to the Hachie Hearts Trail, a collection of 21 painted hearts each with a special theme.

== Parks and recreation ==
Parks in Waxahachie include Spring Park, Getzendaner Memorial Park, Richards Park, Chapman Park, and Brown-Singleton Park. Getzendaner Park features the historic Chautauqua Auditorium, built in 1902. Lake Waxahachie features a range of camping and fishing areas.

== Government ==
The city of Waxahachie is a voluntary member of the North Central Texas Council of Governments association, the purpose of which is to coordinate individual and collective local governments and facilitate regional solutions, eliminate unnecessary duplication, and enable joint decisions.

=== State government ===
Waxahachie is represented in the Texas Senate by Republican Brian Birdwell, District 22, and in the Texas House of Representatives by Republican Brian Harrison, District 10.

The Texas Department of Criminal Justice operates the Waxahachie District Parole Office in Sherman.

=== Federal government ===
At the federal level, the two U.S. senators from Texas are Republicans John Cornyn and Ted Cruz; since 2003, Waxahachie has been part of Texas's 6th congressional district, which is currently represented by Republican Jake Ellzey.

The United States Postal Service operates the Waxahachie Post Office.

== Education ==
=== Primary and secondary ===
Almost all of Waxahachie is served by the Waxahachie Independent School District (WISD), which currently has eight elementary campuses, three middle-school campuses, and two high schools. WISD offers advanced-placement and dual-credit courses, and varied career and technology courses.

Waxahachie High School, classified as 6A, offers a range of extracurricular activities to its students, including football, volleyball, men's and women's basketball, men's and women's soccer, baseball, softball, golf, tennis, concert and marching band, drama, choir, drill team, and dozens of academic teams and clubs. The football program made the playoffs every year from 1989 to 2010.Waxahachie Global High School, an ECHS T-STEM school emphasizing instruction in science, technology, engineering, and mathematics in a small-learning-community environment, opened on August 27, 2007. In 2018 this focus was expanded to include both a healthcare and business pathway.

The city limits of Waxahachie extend into the Ferris, Midlothian, and Red Oak ISDs.

In addition to the district schools, Life School, a public charter-school system, operates a 7–12 grade campus. On April 15, 2014, Life School broke ground on a new high school in Waxahachie, planned to accommodate about 1,000 9th–12th graders.

=== Private schools ===
The several private schools include Waxahachie Preparatory Academy (K-12), Mercy Preparatory Academy (K-12), First Christian Day School (through 8th grade), and St. Joseph Catholic School (through 8th grade).

=== Colleges and universities ===
Two postsecondary educational institutions have campuses in the city of Waxahachie: Navarro College, a community college based in Corsicana, Texas, and Nelson University, a private, four-year university affiliated with the Assemblies of God, which offers accredited undergraduate and graduate degrees.

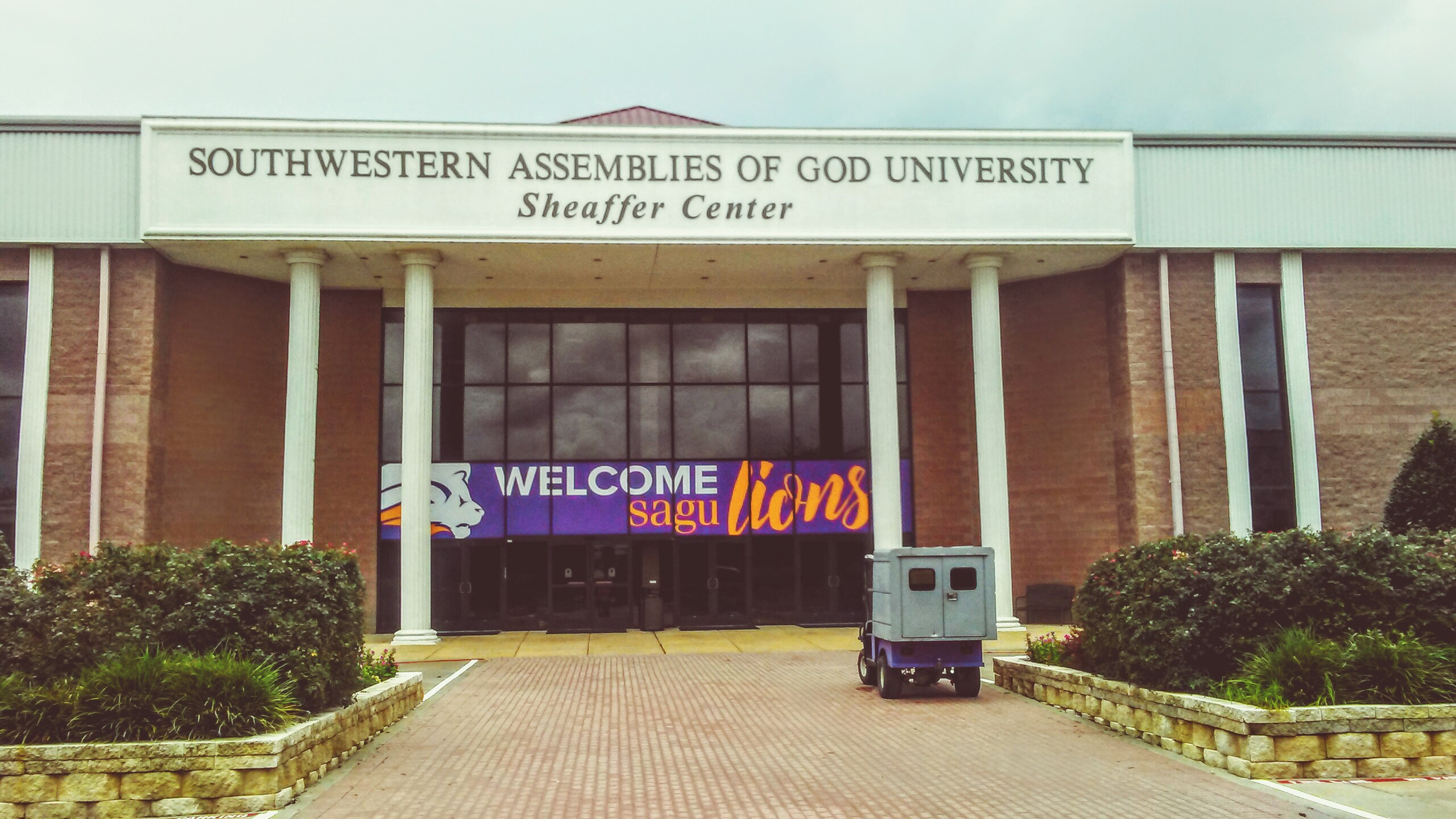
Nelson University in Waxahachie

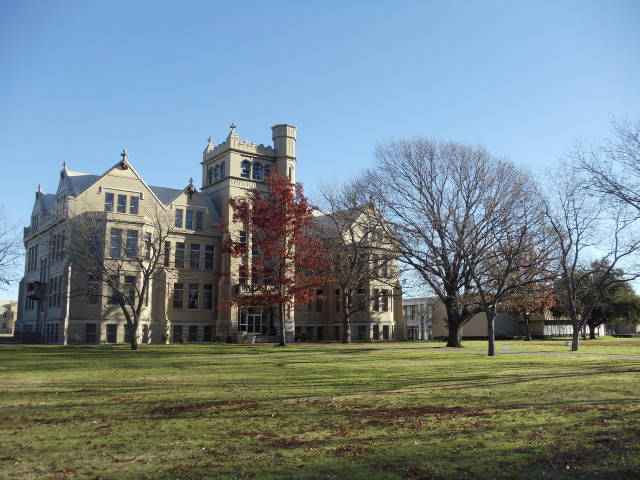
The Farmer Administration Building on the campus of Nelson University. The building was formerly home to Trinity University.

== Media ==
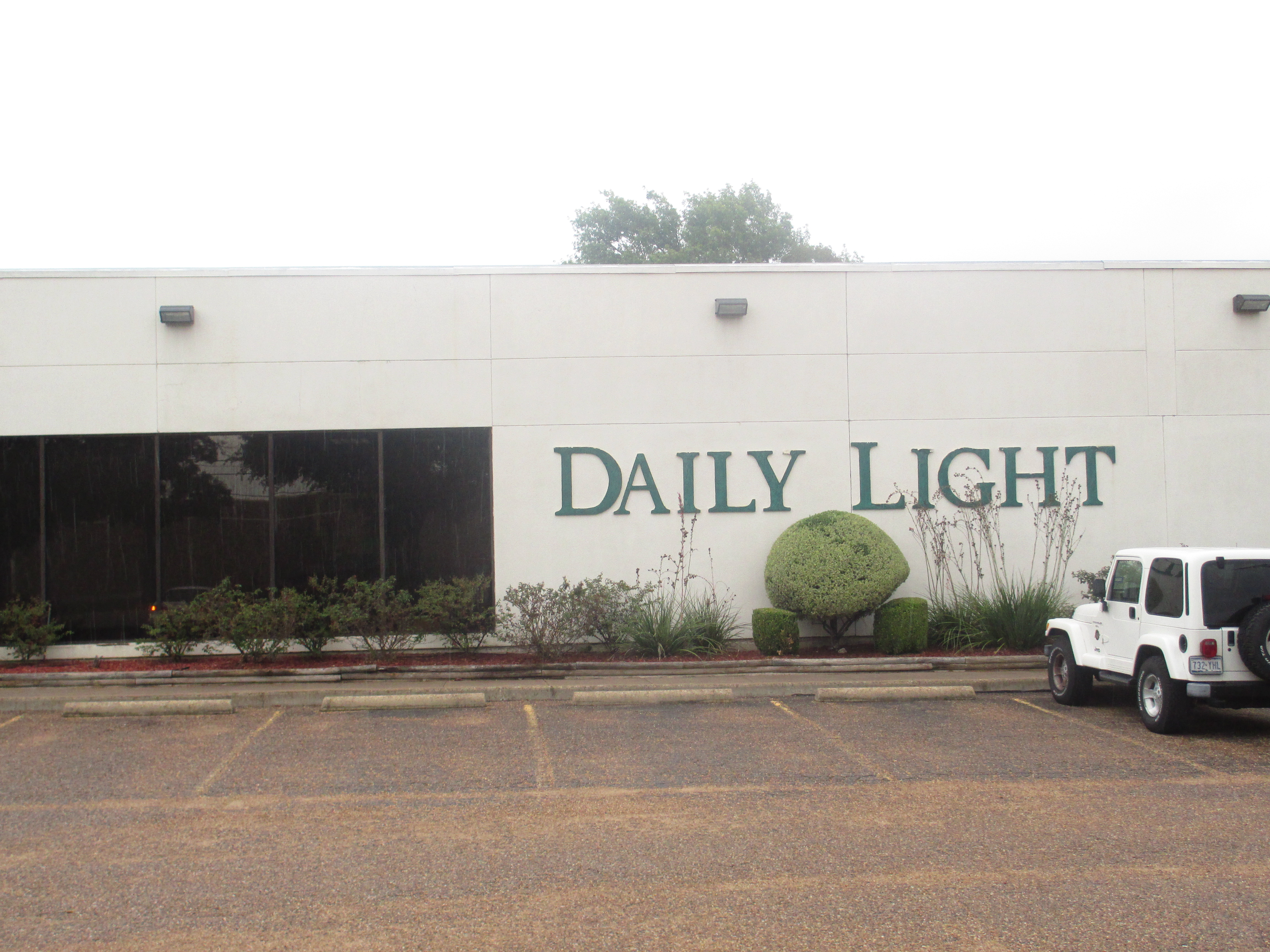
The former Waxahachie Daily Light newspaper office at 200 West Marvin Avenue. The newspaper relocated its office in 2020, and the building now houses the Ellis County offices of Keller Williams Realty.

The first newspaper in Waxahachie, the now-defunct Waxahachie Argus, was established in 1870. The Waxahachie Daily Light has served the town since 1891. Additionally, 47 radio stations are within close listening range of Waxahachie. KBEC radio has served the community and surrounding area since 1955.

== Gallery ==
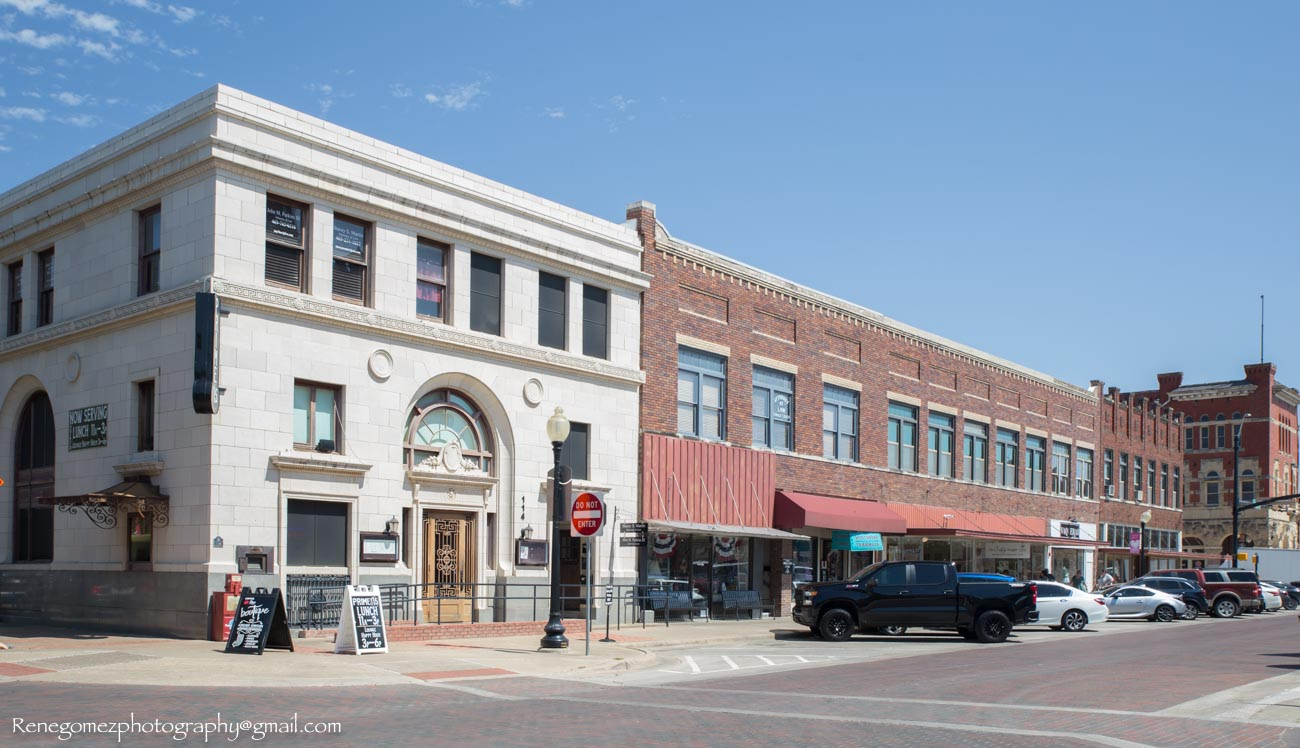
Downtown Waxahachie, at the intersection of Rogers and West Franklin Streets

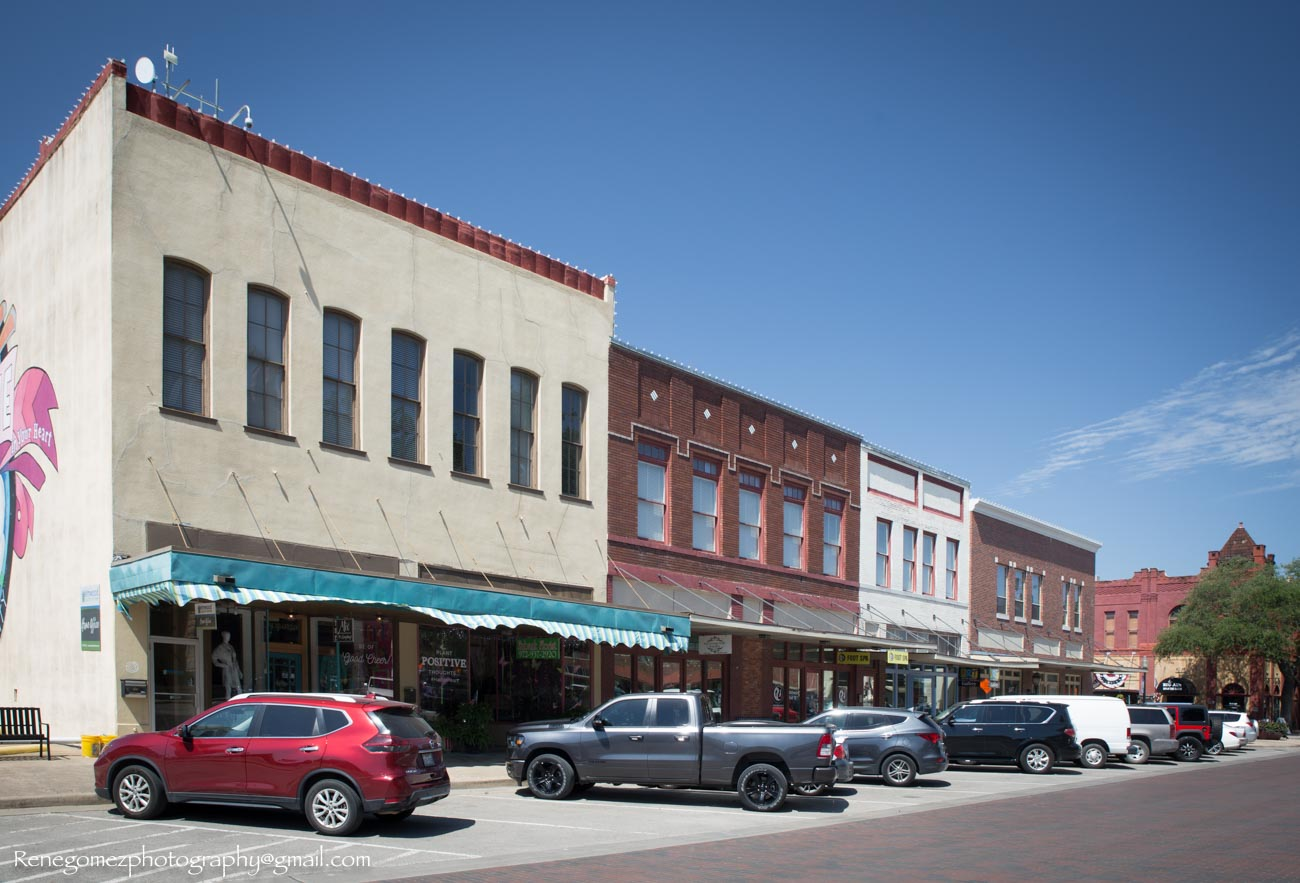
West Franklin Street between South College and Rogers Streets, downtown Waxahachie

== Infrastructure ==
=== Health care ===
Both Altus Emergency Center and Baylor Scott & White Health at Waxahachie provide emergency services locally, as does Ennis Regional Medical Center, about 14 miles away in Ennis. Between 2003 and 2010, Waxahachie's healthcare industry added 555 jobs, making it the city's fourth-largest employment sector.

=== Transportation ===
- Interstate 35E is a major north–south freeway serving as a bypass around the west side of Waxahachie. The freeway connects with Red Oak, DeSoto/Lancaster, and Dallas to the north; Italy, Hillsboro, and Waco to the south.
- U.S. Route 287, also a freeway, runs in a northwest–southeast orientation through the north side of the city. The freeway connects with Midlothian, Mansfield, and Fort Worth to the west and Ennis to the east.
- U.S. Route 77, a north–south highway, serves as the main thoroughfare through the city, passing through downtown and the north side of the city. The highway parallels Interstate 35 and reconnects with the interstate just outside the city limits. Many of the city's commercial developments line Highway 77.

== Notable people ==
- Robert Benton, won an Oscar for Best Original Screenplay for Places in the Heart, filmed in Waxahachie.
- Jammal Brown, professional football player
- Tevin Campbell, Grammy-nominated R&B singer
- Emanuel Cleaver, U.S. representative for Missouri and mayor of Kansas City
- Bessie Coleman, first female African-American pilot (born in Atlanta, Texas; moved to Waxahachie at age 2)
- Elizabeth Otis Dannelly, poet
- Frederic Forrest, Oscar-nominated actor
- Robert J. Groden, JFK assassination conspiracy theorist, released the Zapruder film on national TV on March 6, 1975
- Josie Briggs Hall, author of A Scroll of Facts and Advice (1905), the first book published by a black Texan woman
- Bill Ham, manager for ZZ Top
- Dale Hansen, sports anchor WFAA-TV Channel 8 Dallas, Texas
- John Paul Jackson, minister, prophet and teacher
- Desmond Mason, professional basketball player
- Julie Miller, songwriter, singer, and recording artist
- Dick Murdoch, professional wrestler
- Byron Nelson, professional golfer
- Jim Pitts, former member of the Texas House of Representatives
- Jalen Reagor, professional football player
- Montae Reagor, former defensive tackle for the Denver Broncos and Indianapolis Colts.
- Paul Richards, Major League Baseball player, manager and executive
- Aldrick Robinson, professional football player and coach
- Broderick Sargent, professional football player
- Brian Waters, professional football player
- John Wray, former member of the Texas House of Representatives and former mayor of Waxahachie

== In popular culture ==
Waxahachie has been the filming location for a number of films and television shows. For example, scenes from Bonnie and Clyde (1967) were shot here. The 1983 film Tender Mercies was filmed in Waxahachie, as well as the 1984 film Places in the Heart. The long-running television series Walker, Texas Ranger, starring Chuck Norris, was filmed in Waxahachie on occasion, as were some scenes in Prison Break.

In 2018, an animated short film from Crypt TV titled Dark Vessel featured the town as its 1977-based setting.

In 2021, Miranda Lambert, Jon Randall and Jack Ingram released a song named for the city on their acoustic album The Marfa Tapes. It was later recorded again with full production for inclusion on Lambert's solo album Palomino in 2022.

== Sister cities ==
Sabinas in Coahuila, Mexico, has been proposed as Waxahachie's sister city. Sabinas is located about 70 miles (110 km) south of Eagle Pass, Texas.
