= Ron Finley Stadium =

Finley Stadium
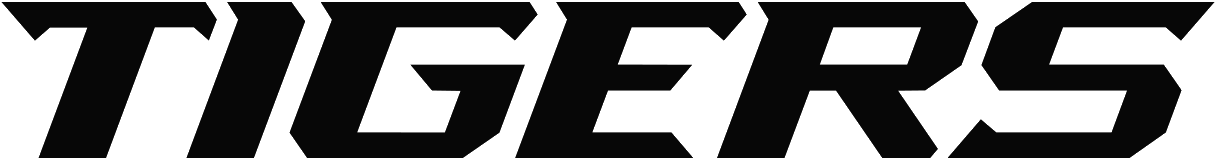

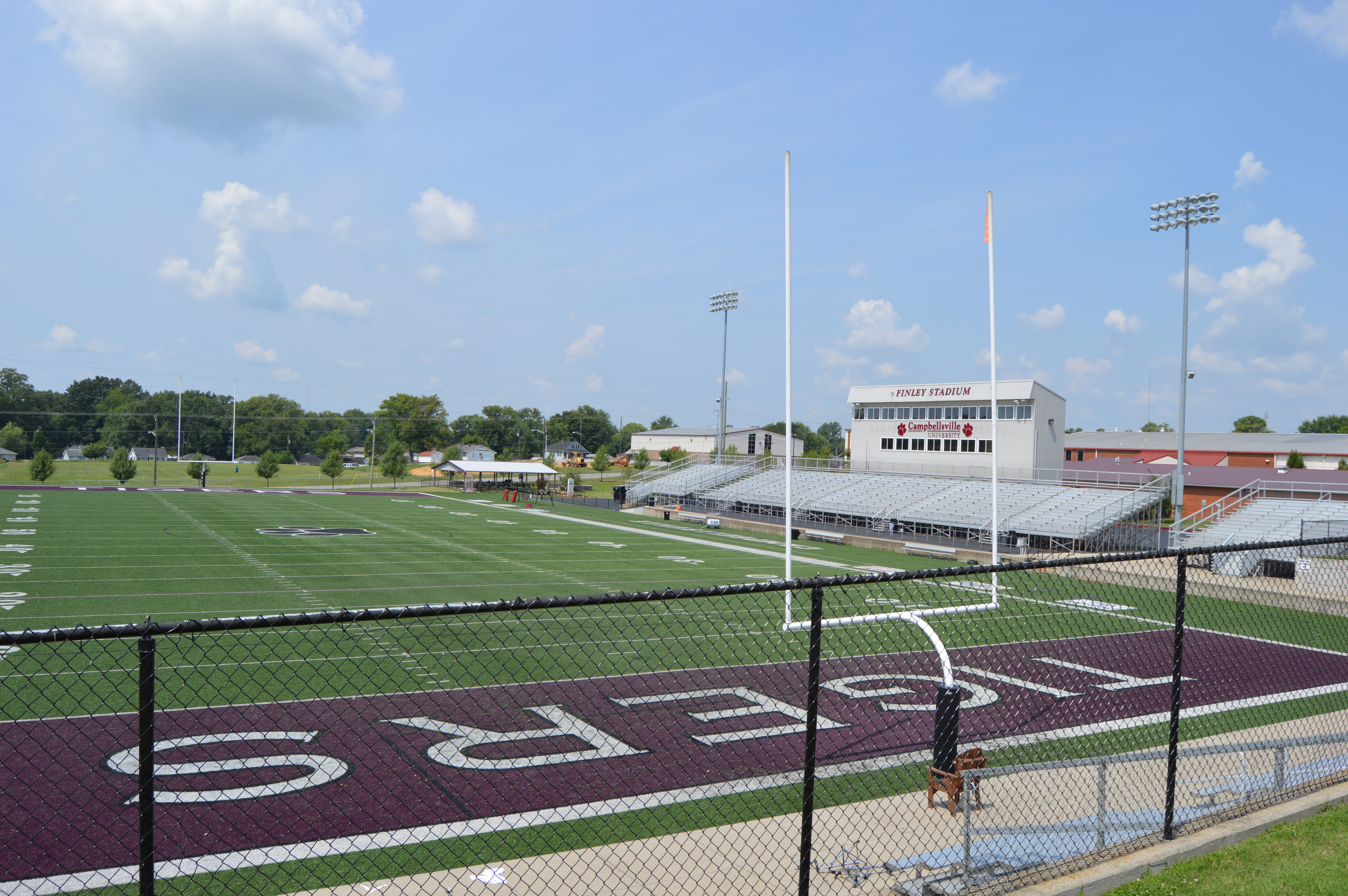
- Interior view of the stadium in 2014
- Interactive map of Finley Stadium
- Full name: Ron Finley Stadium / Citizens Bank Field
- Former names: Tigers Field (1987–2006)
- Address: Campbellsville, KY; United States
- Coordinates: 37.34262°N 85.35136°W
- Owner: Campbellsville University
- Operator: Campbellsville Athletics
- Capacity: 3,500
- Type: Stadium
- Surface: FieldTurf
- Current use: Football; Soccer; Rugby union

Construction
- Opened: 1987; 39 years ago
- Renovated: 1997

Tenants
- Campbellsville Tigers (NAIA) football (1987–present) men's and women's soccer (2010–present)

Ron Finley Stadium / Citizens Bank Field) is a stadium in Campbellsville, Kentucky, United States. It is the home stadium for the Campbellsville University Tigers football and soccer teams. The athletic department completed renovations in 2010, which included a new lighting system and artificial FieldTurf playing surface.

The stadium was dedicated in 2006 in honor of Ron Finley, who helped reinstate the football program in 1987 and served as head coach until 2002.

Events and tenants
Preceded by Younts Stadium	Host of the Victory Bowl; 2011	Succeeded by Francis Field
