= 2008 Malone Pioneers football team =

American college football season

2008 Malone Pioneers football

Victory Bowl, L 44–49 vs. Northwestern (MN)
- Conference: Mid-States Football Association
- Mideast
- Record: 6–4 (4–2 MSFA)
- Head coach: Mike Gardner (3rd season)
- Offensive coordinator: Dustin Miller
- Defensive coordinator: Mike Gardner
- Home stadium: Fawcett Stadium

2008 Mid-States Football Association standings
	Conf.			Overall
Team	W		L	W		L
Mideast League
No. 4 St. Francis (IN) x^	6	–	0	12	–	1
No. 16 Ohio Dominican	4	–	2	7	–	3
No. 22 Saint Xavier	4	–	2	7	–	4
No. 24 Malone	4	–	2	6	–	4
Marian (IN)	2	–	4	7	–	4
Walsh	1	–	5	3	–	8
Taylor	0	–	6	2	–	8
Midwest League
No. 14 St. Ambrose x^	6	–	1	8	–	4
William Penn	5	–	2	7	–	4
McKendree	5	–	2	6	–	4
Quincy	5	–	2	6	–	5
St. Francis (IL)	3	–	4	7	–	4
Olivet Nazarene	3	–	4	4	–	7
Iowa Wesleyan	1	–	6	3	–	8
Trinity International	0	–	7	1	–	10
x – League champion/co-champions ^ – NAIA playoff participant; Rankings from NAIA Coaches' Poll

The 2008 Malone Pioneers football team represented Malone University in the season of 2008 NAIA football season. The Pioneers played their home games in Fawcett Stadium.

The schedule was originally to begin with three non-conference games. The September 6 game against Apprentice in Virginia was cancelled due to Hurricane Hanna. The remaining three non-conference games were against Union College in Kentucky and Olivet Nazarene University in Illinois, followed by St. Xavier later in the season. The season ended with a trip to the 2008 Victory Bowl in Minneapolis, Minnesota, where Malone lost to the Northwestern Eagles.

== Schedule ==
Date	Time	Opponent	Rank	Site	Result	Attendance
September 6		Apprentice*			cancelled	
September 13	1:30 pm	at Union (KY)*	No. 24	Burch/Nau Field; Barbourville, KY	L 28–35	2,232
September 27		at Olivet Nazarene*		Ward Field; Bourbonnais, IL	W 43–3	1,000
October 4	2:00 pm	Marian^{†}		Fawcett Stadium; Canton, OH	W 45–37	2,220
October 11	1:00 pm	at Taylor	No. 25	Wheeler Memorial Stadium; Upland, IN	W 42–17	1,500
October 18	12:00 pm	at Walsh	No. 22	Fawcett Stadium; Canton, OH	W 24–21	3,000
October 25		Urbana*	No. 18	Fawcett Stadium; Canton, OH	W 22–6	1,600
November 1	11:00 am	No. 12 Saint Xavier	No. 16	Fawcett Stadium; Canton, OH	W 27–23	1,200
November 8	12:00 pm	at No. 3 Saint Francis (IN)	No. 10	Bishop D'Arcy Stadium; Fort Wayne, IN	L 24–45	2,300
November 15	2:00 pm	No. 23 Ohio Dominican	No. 13	Fawcett Stadium; Canton, OH	L 24–34	1,000
November 21	7:00 pm (CST)	vs. No. 23 Northwestern (MN)	No. 22	Hubert H. Humphrey Metrodome; Minneapolis, MN (Victory Bowl)	L 44–49	1,421
*Non-conference game; ^{†}Homecoming; Rankings from NAIA Poll released prior to the game; All times are in Eastern time

== Coaching staff ==
=== Head coach ===
The head coach is Mike Gardner, who is in his third season at the helm of the Pioneers. Previously he was head coach at Tabor College. Gardner also works as the defensive coordinator for the team.

=== Assistant coaches ===
Assistant coaches for the team were:

- Offensive Coordinator- Dustin Miller
- Offensive Line - Troy Schenk
- Running Backs - Cliff Schenk
- Defensive Backs - Allen Foster
- Wide Receivers - Nyrell Knight
- Defensive Line - Brian Landies
- Linebackers/Strength & Conditioning - Justin Murphy
- Strength & Conditioning Coordinator - John Tsironis
- Running Backs - Denny Blake

== Game summaries ==
=== Apprentice ===
The Pioneers scheduled season opener on September 6 at the Apprentice School in Newport News, Virginia, was cancelled due to the arrival of Tropical Storm Hanna.

=== Union ===
	1	2	3	4	Total
Malone	14	14	0	0	28
Union	14	7	14	0	35

Malone entered halftime with a 28–21 lead, but was unable to keep pace after halftime. The offensive unit posted just 68 total yards over the final 30 minutes of the game.

The lack of offensive production led to a significant disparity in time of possession for the second half. Union college wore down the Pioneer defense in the hot and humid weather conditions, holding the ball for over 22 minutes during the final two quarters.

Malone dropped to 0–1 on the season with the seven-point defeat while Union improved to 2–0.

=== Olivet Nazarene ===
	1	2	3	4	Total
Malone	21	9	13	0	43
Olivet Nazarene	0	0	3	0	3

The Malone College football team piled up 30 unanswered first-half points in a 43–3 victory on the road Olivet Nazaarene (IL) University. The Tigers were finally able to get on the scoreboard with a field goal on their opening drive of the third quarter, but that would turn out to be the only points Malone's defense would surrender as the unit limited Olivet Nazarene to 167 yards of total offense and 10 first downs.

Olivet Nazarene's three points in Saturday's contest marked the fewest total points allowed in a game by Malone since 1999 when the Pioneers shutout Urbana University on the road, 20–0. With the convincing victory, Malone improved its overall record to 1–1 on the year while Olivet Nazarene fell to 1–3.

=== Marian ===
	1	2	3	4	Total
Marian	0	16	7	14	37
Malone	14	10	7	14	45

The Malone University football team opened 2008 Mid-States Football Association Mideast League play at Fawcett Stadium with a 45–37 victory over visiting Marian (IN) College. Prior to the home opener, there was plenty of excitement in the air with Homecoming festivities in full swing, new uniforms, and Friday's name change from Malone College to Malone University.

On the field, the Pioneers and Knights competed in an offensive shootout that saw a combined 1,013 total yards of offense, 11 touchdowns, and just four punts. Malone led 24–16 at halftime and then maintained at least an eight-point advantage over the final two quarters as each squad tacked on three touchdowns in the second half en route to the 45–37 final.

The loss brought Marian's three-game winning streak to a halt, dropping the Knights' record to 3–2 overall and 0–2 MSFA Mideast. The Pioneers, meanwhile, improved to 2–1 overall and 1–0 in conference play with the victory.

=== Taylor ===
	1	2	3	4	Total
Malone	14	21	7	8	50
Taylor	3	0	7	7	17

Malone entered this game ranked 25th in the NAIA National Poll. The Pioneers completed a 42–17 victory on the road at Taylor (IN) University. The Pioneers scored touchdowns on five of their first six possessions to take command of the League contest.

Malone led 35–3 at halftime and then stretched its advantage to 42–3 midway through the third quarter before Taylor added two late scores to account for the 42–17 final. The Pioneers more than doubled the Trojans total offensive output (633 total yards for Malone, 292 total yards for Taylor) and intercepted three Taylor passes while not committing a turnover of their own for the first time this season.

The win improved Malone's record to 3–1 overall and 2–0 in the MSFA Mideast while Taylor dropped to 2–4 overall and 0–2 in conference play.

=== Walsh ===
	1	2	3	4	Total
Walsh	7	7	7	0	21
Malone	7	0	7	10	24

Malone moved up in rankings to 22nd in the NAIA National Poll and registered a come-from-behind 24–21 victory over local rival Walsh University at Fawcett Stadium.

Trailing 21–17 late in the fourth quarter, the Pioneers took possession of the ball with 4:03 remaining on the clock and proceeded to march down the field on a 12-play, 96-yard scoring drive that was capped off by a 31-yard touchdown pass from quarterback Billy Bob Orsagh to wide receiver Tyler Davis.

Walsh then got the ball back with a little over a minute remaining, but was unable to get into field-goal range as the Pioneer defense stopped the Cavaliers on downs to cement the 24–21 victory. With the win, Malone claimed the Dick Gallagher Memorial Trophy for the third straight year and improved its record to 4–1 overall and 3–0 in the MSFA Mideast. Walsh dropped to 2–5 overall and 0–2 in league play with the loss.

=== Urbana ===
	1	2	3	4	Total
Urbana	0	0	0	6	6
Malone	7	6	9	0	22

Malone entered this week ranked 18th in NAIA National Poll and registered its fifth consecutive victory on Saturday afternoon at Fawcett Stadium with a 22–6 non-conference win against Urbana University. The Pioneers entered the contest with the top-rated offense in the NAIA.

Malone's defense limited Urbana to seven total first downs, negative seven (-7) rushing yards, and 127 yards of total offense. The Pioneers led 13–0 at halftime and then increased their score to 22–0 in the third quarter. Following a blocked fourth-quarter punt, Urbana managed to get on the scoreboard with a touchdown run.

Malone improved their overall record to 5–1 with the victory while Urbana, which is now in transition to becoming a member of NCAA Division II, dropped to 1–7 on the year.

=== St. Xavier ===
	1	2	3	4	Total
St. Xavier	0	3	13	7	23
Malone	0	0	7	20	27

The 16th-ranked Malone team rallied from a 23–14 fourth-quarter deficit to record a 27–23 win against NAIA No. 12 Saint Xavier (IL) University at Fawcett Stadium. The Saint Xavier entered the final quarter with a 16–7 lead, but Pioneer quarterback Billy Bob Orsagh led Malone back into the lead, throwing three touchdown passes to put Malone in front by 27–23 in the fourth quarter.

Saint Xavier threatened to score on its last possession of the game as they moved into scoring position with a first and goal on the Pioneers nine-yard line. However, as it was able to do throughout the contest, the Malone defense came up with a big stop when it needed it most, keeping the Cougars out of the end zone on four straight plays to preserve the four-point triumph.

The victory stretched the Pioneers current winning streak to six games and improved Malone's record to 6–1 overall and 4–0 in conference play. Saint Xavier, meanwhile, saw its six-game winning streak come to an end as the Cougars record fell to 6–3 overall and 3–1 in league play.

=== St. Francis ===
	1	2	3	4	Total
Malone	7	3	7	7	24
Saint Francis	14	10	21	0	45

The #10 Malone University football team suffered its first Mid-States Football Association Mideast League defeat of the year in Fort Wayne, Indiana. Malone committed four turnovers and had two punts blocked in the 45–24 loss to the #3-ranked University of Saint Francis.

The Pioneers trailed by a 24–10 deficit at halftime before Saint Francis scored three quick third-quarter touchdowns that stretched the lead to 45–10. Malone continued to play and added two late scores to cut the Saint Francis advantage to 45–24. However, the Pioneers were unable to overcome their early miscues, falling to 6–2 overall and 4–1 in the MSFA Mideast.

With the victory, Saint Francis secured at least a share of the league title, pushing its home winning streak to 50 games and improving its record to 9–0 overall and 5–0 in the MSFA Mideast.

=== Ohio Dominican ===
	1	2	3	4	Total
Ohio Dominican	7	14	0	13	34
Malone	0	0	16	8	24

The NAIA #13 Malone University football team scored 16 unanswered third-quarter points but still failed to overcome a 21–0 halftime deficit as the Pioneers concluded their regular-season schedule at Fawcett Stadium with a 34–24 loss to NAIA No. 23 Ohio Dominican University. The victory improved Ohio Dominican's record to 7–3 overall and 4–2 in the MSFA Mideast while Malone fell to 6–3 overall and 4–2 in league play.

Ohio Dominican entered the game coming of a previous 56–0 win over Urbana while Malone came in after a 45–24 loss to Saint Francis (Indiana). The previous meeting of the two teams was in 2007, when Ohio Dominican won 31–21.

=== Victory Bowl ===
See 2008 Victory Bowl

	1	2	3	4	Total
Malone	7	21	7	9	44
Northwestern (MN)	7	14	14	14	49

Malone concluded its 2008 play by taking on the 8–2 Northwestern (MN) Eagles in the 2008 Victory Bowl. The game was played at 7:00 pm (CST) on Friday November 21, 2008, at the Hubert H. Humphrey Metrodome in Minneapolis, Minnesota. Malone was defending their title as the 2007 Victory Bowl winners, and made their third consecutive trip to the bowl.

Malone and Northwestern matched closely on statistics for the game with the exception of turnovers, where Northwestern had the advantage. In addition to fumbles, two interceptions were returned for touchdowns by Northwestern.

== Season rankings ==
At the conclusion of the 2008 regular season, Malone had created several impressive rankings for both individual and team play in the NAIA Division I, including:

- Team rankings
  - #4 in first downs per game
  - #6 in total offense per game
  - #8 in sacks per game
  - #9 pass offence per game
- Individual rankings
  - #2 in forced fumbles per game (Dennis THornton)
  - #3 in reception yards per game (Derek Deardorff)
  - #5 in kick off return yards per attempt (Shane Golden)
  - #7 in passing yards per game and #8 in total offense yards per game (Billy Bob Orsagh)
