= Mike Gardner =

American football player and coach (born 1967)

Current position
- Title: Head coach
- Team: Tabor
- Conference: KCAC
- Record: 117–80

Biographical details
- Born: March 9, 1967 (age 59); Roeland Park, Kansas, U.S.

Playing career
- 1986–1990: Baker
- Position: Kicker

Coaching career (HC unless noted)
- 1990–1993: Hastings (ST/RC)
- 1993–1996: Bethel (KS) (QB/TE/WR)
- 1996–1999: Lindenwood (ST)
- 2000: Lindenwood (DC)
- 2001–2003: Tabor (DC)
- 2004–2005: Tabor
- 2006–2009: Malone
- 2010–present: Tabor

Head coaching record
- Overall: 142–98
- Bowls: 1–2
- Tournaments: 3–5 (NAIA playoffs)

Accomplishments and honors

Championships
- 5 KCAC (2004–2005, 2015–2017)

Awards
- KCAC Coach of the Year (2004, 2005, 2012, 2015); AFCA NAIA Assistant Coach of the Year (2003); AFLAC Assistant Coach of the Year (2003)

Michael Norman Gardner (born March 9, 1967) is an American college football coach. He is the head football coach for Tabor College, a position he held from 2004 to 2005 and resumed in 2010. Gardner served as the head football coach at Malone University in Canton, Ohio from 2006 to 2009. He was chosen to replace Mike Gottsch after Tabor's winless 2009 season. Gardner's teams achieved postseason play in each of his first five years as a head coach at the college level—the first two years qualifying for the NAIA Football National Championship playoffs and the next three years appearing in the Victory Bowl.

== Playing career ==
Gardner played college football at Baker University in Baldwin City, Kansas from 1986 to 1990, where he held a school record 53-yard field goal that was broken in 2007. He was an All-American each of his last three years at Baker.

== Coaching career ==
=== Assistant coaching ===
Gardner began in coaching as special teams and recruiting coordinator at Hastings College in Hastings, Nebraska from 1990 to 1993. He later held assistant coaching positions at Bethel College in North Newton, Kansas, Lindenwood University in St. Charles, Missouri, Where he coached All-American returner Gator Adams, helping him achieve the honor and Tabor College in Hillsboro, Kansas.

=== Tabor ===
In 2004, he became the head football coach at Tabor College. During his time at Tabor his teams won two conference championships and advanced to the national playoffs.

=== Malone ===
Gardner was named head football coach at Malone College in 2006. His team at Malone began the 2008 season ranked No. 24 in the NAIA preseason poll. Following the lackluster 4-6 2009 season at Malone, Gardner resigned to clear the way for his return to Tabor. He stated “I wasn’t looking for an opportunity to go by any means,” Gardner said. “This just presented itself."

Gardner was the fifth football coach in Malone's history, and his coaching record at Malone was 25–18.

=== Tabor ===
Gardner returned to Tabor in 2010 season and led the team to a record of 4–6, finishing sixth in the conference. Counting his previous two years coaching at Tabor, he is now the winningest coach in the history of the program. Gardner continued success at Tabor, taking his team to the NAIA quarterfinals in the 2015 season and again earning conference Coach of the Year honors. As of 2015, Gardner has been named Coach of the Year in the conference for four of his eight years at Tabor.

== Awards ==
Gardner served as the defensive coordinator at Tabor from 2001 to 2003 and helped guide the Bluejays to their first-ever NAIA national playoff appearance in 2003 and a No. 15 NAIA national ranking. He was named the AFCA NAIA Assistant Coach of the Year and the AFLAC Assistant Coach of the Year for the 2003 season. His 2003 defense ranked 11th in the final NAIA statistics while his 2002 team ranked an impressive second overall. In 2005, Gardner was named Kansas Collegiate Athletic Conference "Co-Coach" of the year along with Saint Mary coach Lance Hinson. He earned the honor again after the 2012 campaign, this time holding the award as sole recipient.

As a player, Gardner was a three-time NAIA All-American and a four-time All-Conference selection while at Baker University (KS) and he played for a national championship in 1986. He has been involved in 10 national playoff games as a player and eight as a coach and his 2005 Tabor squad won its first-round playoff contest.

== Personal life ==
Gardner is a 1990 graduate of Baker University with a bachelor's degree in physical education. He later earned a Master of Arts in teaching at Hastings College in 1993. Gardner and his wife have two children and live in Hillsboro. He played junior high and high school football at Olathe South High School and Indian Trail Middle School in Olathe, Kansas plus his seventh grade year at Concordia Junior-Senior High School in Concordia, Kansas.

== Head coaching record ==
Year	Team	Overall	Conference	Standing	Bowl/playoffs	NAIA^{#}
Tabor Bluejays (Kansas Collegiate Athletic Conference) (2004–2005)
2004	Tabor	9–2	8–1	1st	L NAIA First Round	11
2005	Tabor	11–1	9–0	1st	L NAIA Quarterfinal	6
Malone Pioneers (Mid-States Football Association) (2006–2009)
2006	Malone	7–4	4–2	T–2nd (MEL)	L Victory	19
2007	Malone	8–4	4–3	4th (MEL)	W Victory	22
2008	Malone	6–4	4–2	T–2nd (MEL)	L Victory	25
2009	Malone	4–6	2–5	6th (MEL)		
Malone:		25–18	14–12			
Tabor Bluejays (Kansas Collegiate Athletic Conference) (2010–present)
2010	Tabor	4–6	4–5	6th		
2011	Tabor	3–7	2–7	8th		
2012	Tabor	8–2	7–1	2nd		17
2013	Tabor	10–3	7–2	2nd	L NAIA Quarterfinal	11
2014	Tabor	7–4	5–4	T–4th		24
2015	Tabor	11–2	9–0	1st	L NAIA Quarterfinal	8
2016	Tabor	8–3	8–1	1st	L NAIA First Round	12
2017	Tabor	8–2	8–1	T–1st		17
2018	Tabor	6–4	6–4	4th		
2019	Tabor	6–5	5–5	T–5th		
2020–21	Tabor	3–7	1–6	T–7th		
2021	Tabor	3–8	2–8	9th		
2022	Tabor	6–5	5–5	T–5th		
2023	Tabor	3–8	2–4	T–4th (Bissell)		
2024	Tabor	6–5	4–1	2nd (Bissell)		
2025	Tabor	5–6	3–2	3rd (Kessinger)		
2026	Tabor	0–0	0–0	(Kessinger)		
Tabor:		117–80	95–57			
Total:		142–98				
National championship Conference title Conference division title or championship game berth
^{#}NAIA Coaches' Poll.
