= 2008 college football season =

The 2008 college football season may refer to:

- 2008 NCAA Division I FBS football season
- 2008 NCAA Division I FCS football season
- 2008 NCAA Division II football season
- 2008 NCAA Division III football season
- 2008 NAIA Football National Championship
