= 2008 Saint Francis Cougars football team =

American college football season

2008 Saint Francis Cougars football

NAIA Playoff Semifinalist
- Conference: Mid-States Football Association
- Mideast League
- Record: 12–1 (6–0 MSFA (MEL))
- Head coach: Kevin Donley (11th season)
- Offensive coordinator: Patrick Donley, Trevor Miller (5th, 3rd season)
- Defensive coordinator: Eric Wagoner (1st season)
- Home stadium: Bishop John M. D'Arcy Stadium

2008 Mid-States Football Association standings
	Conf.			Overall
Team	W		L	W		L
Mideast League
No. 4 St. Francis (IN) x^	6	–	0	12	–	1
No. 16 Ohio Dominican	4	–	2	7	–	3
No. 22 Saint Xavier	4	–	2	7	–	4
No. 24 Malone	4	–	2	6	–	4
Marian (IN)	2	–	4	7	–	4
Walsh	1	–	5	3	–	8
Taylor	0	–	6	2	–	8
Midwest League
No. 14 St. Ambrose x^	6	–	1	8	–	4
William Penn	5	–	2	7	–	4
McKendree	5	–	2	6	–	4
Quincy	5	–	2	6	–	5
St. Francis (IL)	3	–	4	7	–	4
Olivet Nazarene	3	–	4	4	–	7
Iowa Wesleyan	1	–	6	3	–	8
Trinity International	0	–	7	1	–	10
x – League champion/co-champions ^ – NAIA playoff participant; Rankings from NAIA Coaches' Poll

The 2008 Saint Francis Cougars football team represented the University of Saint Francis, located in Fort Wayne, Indiana, in the 2008 NAIA football season. They were led by head coach Kevin Donley, who served his 11th year as the first and only head coach in the history of Saint Francis football. The Cougars played their home games at Bishop John D'Arcy Stadium and were members of the Mid-States Football Association (MSFA) Mideast League (MEL). The Cougars finished in first place in the MSFA MEL division, so they received an automatic bid to the 2008 postseason NAIA playoffs.

Saint Francis reached the NAIA semifinals, where they lost to Sioux Falls by a score of 24–6.

== Schedule ==
After an undefeated regular season, USF finished with a loss at Sioux Falls. This was the second time in three seasons that Sioux Falls put the only blemish on the USF record.

Date	Time	Opponent	Rank	Site	Result	Attendance
September 6	Noon	Trinity International*	No. 4	Bishop D'Arcy Stadium; Fort Wayne, IN	W 67–0	2,700
September 13	2:00pm	at Quincy*	No. 4	QU Stadium; Quincy, IL	W 21–0	928
September 20	1:00pm	at Taylor	No. 4	Jim Wheeler Memorial Stadium; Upland, IN	W 55–7	2,750
September 27	Noon	No. 10 St. Ambrose*	No. 4	Bishop D'Arcy Stadium; Fort Wayne, IN	W 43–14	2,850
October 4	Noon	No. 8 Ohio Dominican*	No. 4	Bishop D'Arcy Stadium; Fort Wayne, IN	W 35–0	5,000
October 11	2:00pm	at Marian	No. 4	Grosskopf Stadium; Indianapolis, IN - Pike HS	W 63–14	2,287
October 25	Noon	Walsh	No. 3	Bishop D'Arcy Stadium; Fort Wayne, IN	W 52–12	2,150
November 1	Noon	at Urbana	No. 3	Ellis Field; Urbana, OH	W 62–20	850
November 8	Noon	No. 10 Malone	No. 3	Bishop D'Arcy Stadium; Fort Wayne, IN	W 45–24	2,300
November 15	2:00pm	at No. 18 Saint Xavier	No. 3	Deaton Field; Chicago, IL	W 47–30	2,000
November 22	Noon	No. 11 Union*	No. 3	Bishop D'Arcy Stadium; Fort Wayne, IN (NAIA First Round)	W 58–3	2,350
November 29	Noon	No. 8 Cumberlands*	No. 3	Bishop D'Arcy Stadium; Fort Wayne, IN (NAIA Quarterfinal)	W 31–20	2,000
December 6	1:00pm	at No. 2 Sioux Falls*	No. 3	Bob Young Field; Sioux Falls, SD (NAIA Semifinal)	L 6–24	1,609
*Non-conference game; Rankings from Coaches' Poll released prior to the game; All times are in Eastern time

== Ranking movements ==
Ranking movements Legend: ██ Increase in ranking ██ Decrease in ranking
	Week											
Poll	Pre	1	2	3	4	5	6	7	8	9	10	Final
NAIA Coaches' Poll	4	4	4	4	4	4	3	3	3	3	3	4
