= 2008 Victory Bowl =

| Malone Pioneers | Northwestern Eagles |
| (6–3) | (8–2) |
| 44 | 49 |
| Head coach: Mike Gardner | Head coach: Kirk Talley |
| | 1 | 2 | 3 | 4 | Total |
|---|---|---|---|---|---|
| Malone | 7 | 21 | 7 | 9 | 44 |
| Northwestern | 7 | 14 | 14 | 14 | 49 |
- Date: November 21, 2008
- Season: 2008
- Stadium: Hubert H. Humphrey Metrodome
- Location: Minneapolis, Minnesota
- MVP: Offensive: Zach Tarter (Northwestern); Defensive: Wesley Kauffman (Malone)
- Attendance: 1,421

The 2008 Victory Bowl is a college football post-season bowl game. The game was played on November 21, 2008, at the Hubert H. Humphrey Metrodome in Minneapolis, Minnesota. The Malone Pioneers from the NAIA played against the NCAA Division III Northwestern Eagles.

Malone failed to defend its title as the 2007 Victory Bowl winners on their third consecutive trip to the bowl. Northwestern's win was its second Victory Bowl championship and fourth appearance in the game's twelve-year history.

== Game summary ==
Northwestern and Malone University scored a combined 93 points as the Eagles from Northwestern claimed a 49–44 win. The contest was closely competed and it was not until under a minute remained that the game's outcome was decided. Malone held a 28–14 lead midway through the second quarter, but after that the point differential remained within seven points or less until Northwestern's Ty Crabtree ran an interception 50 yards for the Eagles’ final score of the game.

=== Scoring Summary ===
Scoring summary

| Quarter | Time | Drive | | | Team | Scoring information | Score | |
| Quarter | Time | Plays | Yards | TOP | Team | Scoring information | Malone Pioneers | Northwestern Eagles |
|---|---|---|---|---|---|---|---|---|
| 1 | 9:46 | 6 | 62 | 1:45 | Malone Pioneers | Joseph Peters 13-yard touchdown run, Nick Allison kick good | 7 | 0 |
| 1 | 0:27 | 1 | 34 | | Northwestern Eagles | Interception returned 34 yards for touchdown by Noah Hadro, Cody Crum kick Good | 7 | 7 |
| 2 | 14:25 | 4 | 32 | 1:02 | Northwestern Eagles | Ryan Long 23-yard touchdown reception from Zach Tarter, Cody Crum kick Good | 7 | 14 |
| 2 | 11:20 | 8 | 60 | 3:05 | Malone Pioneers | Joseph Peters 11-yard touchdown run, Nick Allison kick good | 14 | 14 |
| 2 | 9:21 | 3 | 24 | 0:45 | Malone Pioneers | Joseph Peters 17-yard touchdown reception from Billy Bob Orsagh, Nick Allison kick Good | 21 | 14 |
| 2 | 8:19 | 1 | 28 | 0:02 | Malone Pioneers | Derek Deardorff 28-yard touchdown reception from Billy Bob Orsagh, Nick Allison kick Good | 28 | 14 |
| 2 | 0:34 | 7 | 88 | 1:38 | Northwestern Eagles | Zach Tarter 1-yard touchdown run, Cody Crum kick Good | 28 | 21 |
| 3 | 10:46 | 7 | 63 | 2:04 | Northwestern Eagles | Ja Rusinkovich 21-yard touchdown reception from Zach Tarter, Cody Crum kick Good | 28 | 28 |
| 3 | 5:23 | 6 | 87 | 3:04 | Northwestern Eagles | Cody Crum 19-yard touchdown reception from Zach Tarter, Cody Crum kick Good | 28 | 35 |
| 3 | 1:56 | 9 | 60 | 3:27 | Malone Pioneers | Derek Deardorff 3-yard touchdown reception from Billy Bob Orsagh, Nick Allison kick Good | 35 | 35 |
| 4 | 11:14 | 12 | 32 | 4:01 | Malone Pioneers | 20-yard field goal by Nick Allison | 38 | 35 |
| 4 | 2:58 | 15 | 57 | 8:16 | Northwestern Eagles | Ja Rusinkovich 5-yard touchdown reception from Zach Tarter, Cody Crum kick Good | 38 | 42 |
| 4 | 0:57 | 1 | 50 | | Northwestern Eagles | Interception returned 50 yards for touchdown by Ty Crabtree, Cody Crum kick Good | 38 | 49 |
| 4 | 0:12 | 5 | 58 | 0:45 | Malone Pioneers | Josh Settlemire 19-yard touchdown reception from Billy Bob Orsagh, 2-point Billy Bob Orsagh Pass Failed | 44 | 49 |
| "TOP" = time of possession. For other American football terms, see Glossary of American football. | | | | | | | Malone Pioneers | Northwestern Eagles |
