= Gottsch =

Gottsch or the accented Göttsch is a surname. Notable people with the surname include:

- Mike Gottsch, American football coach
- Patrick Gottsch (1953–2024), American media executive
- Walter Göttsch (1896–1918), German World War I flying ace
