= 2008 Sioux Falls Cougars football team =

American college football season

2008 Sioux Falls Cougars football

NAIA national champion GPAC champion

NAIA National Championship Game, W 23–7 vs. Carroll (MT)
- Conference: Great Plains Athletic Conference
- Record: 14–0 (10–0 GPAC)
- Head coach: Kalen DeBoer (4th season)
- Offensive coordinator: Chuck Morrell (10th season)
- Defensive coordinator: Jon Anderson (7th season)

2008 Great Plains Athletic Conference football standings
	Conf.			Overall
Team	W		L	W		L
No. 1 Sioux Falls $^	10	–	0	15	–	0
No. 5 Morningside ^	9	–	1	10	–	2
No. 23 Dakota Wesleyan	7	–	3	7	–	3
Nebraska Wesleyan	7	–	3	7	–	3
No. 19 Northwestern (IA)	7	–	3	7	–	3
Hastings	6	–	4	7	–	4
Midland Lutheran	5	–	5	6	–	5
Doane	3	–	7	4	–	7
Dana	2	–	8	3	–	8
Briar Cliff	2	–	8	2	–	9
Concordia (NE)	1	–	9	1	–	9
Dordt	1	–	9	1	–	10
$ – Conference champion; ^ – NAIA playoff participant; Rankings from NAIA Coaches' Poll

The 2008 Sioux Falls Cougars football team represented the University of Sioux Falls in the 2008 NAIA football season. The Cougars captured the 2008 NAIA Football National Championship with a 23–7 victory over the top-ranked Carroll (MT). The team also won the Great Plains Athletic Conference championship with a perfect 10–0 record. This was the school's third NAIA national championship (1996, 2006) and second in three years. The team was coached by Kalen DeBoer.

== Schedule ==
Game	Date	Opponent	Result	Cougars	Opponents	Record
1	9/6	@ Nebraska Wesleyan	Win	35	0	1–0 (1–0)
2	9/13	Dana	Win	70	0	2–0 (2–0)
3	9/20	@ Hastings	Win	30	17	3–0 (3–0)
4	9/27	Concordia (NE)	Win	47	0	4–0 (4–0)
5	10/4	@ Doane	Win	37	7	5–0 (5–0)
6	10/11	Briar Cliff	Win	42	0	6–0 (6–0)
7	10/25	@ Dakota Wesleyan	Win	38	0	7–0 (7–0)
8	11/1	Northwestern	Win	19	0	8–0 (8–0)
9	11/8	@ Dordt	Win	34	2	9–0 (9–0)
10	11/15	Morningside	Win	34	31	10–0 (10–0)
11	11/22	#15 St. Ambrose (NAIA First Round)	Win	28	0	11–0 (10–0)
12	11/29	#9 Langston (NAIA Quarterfinals)	Win	50	13	12–0 (10–0)
13	12/6	#3 St. Francis (Ind.) (NAIA Semifinals)	Win	24	6	13–0 (10–0)
14	12/20	#1 Carroll (NAIA Championship)	Win	23	7	14–0 (10–0)

USF would start the season ranked #2 and would stay at that spot through the championship series.
