= 2008 NAIA football season =

American college football season

- National Championship: Barron Stadium; Rome, GA; December 20, 2008
- Champion: Sioux Falls
- Player of the Year: Owen Koeppen (linebacker, Carroll (MT))

The 2008 NAIA football season was the component of the 2008 college football season organized by the National Association of Intercollegiate Athletics (NAIA) in the United States. The season's playoffs, known as the NAIA Football National Championship, culminated with the championship game on December 20, at Barron Stadium in Rome, Georgia. The Sioux Falls Cougars defeated the Carroll Fighting Saints, 23–7, in the title game to win the program's third NAIA championship and second in three years.

== Conference standings ==
2008 Central States Football League standings
	Conf.			Overall
Team	W		L	W		L
No. 7 Langston $^	4	–	0	10	–	3
NW Oklahoma State ^*	3	–	1	9	–	2
Bacone	2	–	2	6	–	5
Southern Nazarene	1	–	3	3	–	8
Texas College	0	–	4	1	–	9
$ – Conference champion; ^ – NAIA playoff participant * – Northwestern Oklahoma State was declared ineligible during the playoffs and forfeited two wins.; Rankings from NAIA Coaches' Poll

2008 Dakota Athletic Conference football standings
	Conf.			Overall
Team	W		L	W		L
No. 13 Dickinson State $^	7	–	0	7	–	4
No. 25 Jamestown	5	–	2	7	–	3
Minot State	5	–	2	6	–	4
Black Hills State	4	–	3	6	–	4
South Dakota Mines	3	–	4	5	–	5
Valley City State	3	–	4	5	–	5
Dakota State	1	–	6	3	–	7
Mayville State	0	–	7	1	–	9
$ – Conference champion; ^ – NAIA playoff participant; Rankings from NAIA Coaches' Poll

2008 Frontier Conference football standings
	Conf.			Overall
Team	W		L	W		L
No. 2 Carroll (MT) $^	10	–	0	13	–	1
No. 21 Montana State–Northern	7	–	3	7	–	3
Eastern Oregon	4	–	6	5	–	6
Montana Tech	4	–	6	4	–	7
Rocky Mountain	3	–	7	4	–	7
Montana Western	2	–	8	2	–	9
$ – Conference champion; ^ – NAIA playoff participant; Rankings from NAIA Coaches' Poll

2008 Great Plains Athletic Conference football standings
	Conf.			Overall
Team	W		L	W		L
No. 1 Sioux Falls $^	10	–	0	15	–	0
No. 5 Morningside ^	9	–	1	10	–	2
No. 23 Dakota Wesleyan	7	–	3	7	–	3
Nebraska Wesleyan	7	–	3	7	–	3
No. 19 Northwestern (IA)	7	–	3	7	–	3
Hastings	6	–	4	7	–	4
Midland Lutheran	5	–	5	6	–	5
Doane	3	–	7	4	–	7
Dana	2	–	8	3	–	8
Briar Cliff	2	–	8	2	–	9
Concordia (NE)	1	–	9	1	–	9
Dordt	1	–	9	1	–	10
$ – Conference champion; ^ – NAIA playoff participant; Rankings from NAIA Coaches' Poll

2008 Heart of America Athletic Conference football standings
	Conf.			Overall
Team	W		L	W		L
No. 8 MidAmerica Nazarene $^	10	–	0	10	–	1
No. 3 Lindenwood ^	9	–	1	11	–	2
No. 12 Baker ^	8	–	2	8	–	4
No. 17 Missouri Valley	7	–	3	7	–	3
Benedictine (KS)	6	–	4	7	–	4
Evangel	4	–	6	4	–	7
William Jewell	4	–	6	4	–	7
Central Methodist	3	–	7	3	–	8
Avila	2	–	8	3	–	8
Graceland	2	–	8	2	–	8
Culver–Stockton	0	–	10	0	–	11
$ – Conference champion; ^ – NAIA playoff participant; Rankings from NAIA Coaches' Poll

2008 Kansas Collegiate Athletic Conference football standings
	Conf.			Overall
Team	W		L	W		L
No. 9 Friends $^	9	–	0	10	–	1
No. 20 Ottawa	7	–	2	8	–	2
Sterling	7	–	2	7	–	3
Bethel (KS)	5	–	4	6	–	4
Kansas Wesleyan	5	–	4	6	–	4
Saint Mary (KS)	4	–	5	5	–	5
McPherson	3	–	6	4	–	6
Bethany (KS)	2	–	7	2	–	8
Tabor	2	–	7	2	–	8
Southwestern (KS)	1	–	8	1	–	9
$ – Conference champion; ^ – NAIA playoff participant; Rankings from NAIA Coaches' Poll

2008 Mid-South Conference football standings
	Conf.			Overall
Team	W		L	W		L
East Division
No. 6 Cumberlands (KY) x^	6	–	0	10	–	2
No. 10 Union (KY) ^	5	–	1	9	–	3
No. 19 Virginia–Wise	4	–	2	8	–	3
Georgetown (KY)	3	–	3	5	–	5
Campbellsville	2	–	4	3	–	8
Pikeville	1	–	5	2	–	9
West Virginia Tech	0	–	6	0	–	11
West Division
No. 11 Shorter x^	4	–	1	9	–	3
No. 15 Lambuth x^	4	–	1	8	–	4
Cumberland (TN) x	4	–	1	6	–	5
Belhaven	2	–	3	4	–	6
Bethel (TN)	1	–	4	2	–	9
Faulkner	0	–	5	2	–	9
x – Division champion/co-champions; ^ – NAIA playoff participant; Rankings from NAIA Coaches' Poll

2008 Mid-States Football Association standings
	Conf.			Overall
Team	W		L	W		L
Mideast League
No. 4 St. Francis (IN) x^	6	–	0	12	–	1
No. 16 Ohio Dominican	4	–	2	7	–	3
No. 22 Saint Xavier	4	–	2	7	–	4
No. 24 Malone	4	–	2	6	–	4
Marian (IN)	2	–	4	7	–	4
Walsh	1	–	5	3	–	8
Taylor	0	–	6	2	–	8
Midwest League
No. 14 St. Ambrose x^	6	–	1	8	–	4
William Penn	5	–	2	7	–	4
McKendree	5	–	2	6	–	4
Quincy	5	–	2	6	–	5
St. Francis (IL)	3	–	4	7	–	4
Olivet Nazarene	3	–	4	4	–	7
Iowa Wesleyan	1	–	6	3	–	8
Trinity International	0	–	7	1	–	10
x – League champion/co-champions ^ – NAIA playoff participant; Rankings from NAIA Coaches' Poll

2008 NAIA independents football records
	Conf.			Overall
Team	W		L	W		L
SAGU		–		4	–	5
Peru State		–		4	–	6
Southern Oregon		–		3	–	7
Southern Virginia		–		3	–	8
Webber International		–		3	–	8
Azusa Pacific		–		2	–	8
Edward Waters		–		2	–	8
Grand View		–		2	–	8
Haskell		–		2	–	9
Kentucky Christian		–		1	–	9
Waldorf		–		1	–	10
