= Hubert H. Humphrey Metrodome =

Former stadium in Minneapolis, Minnesota

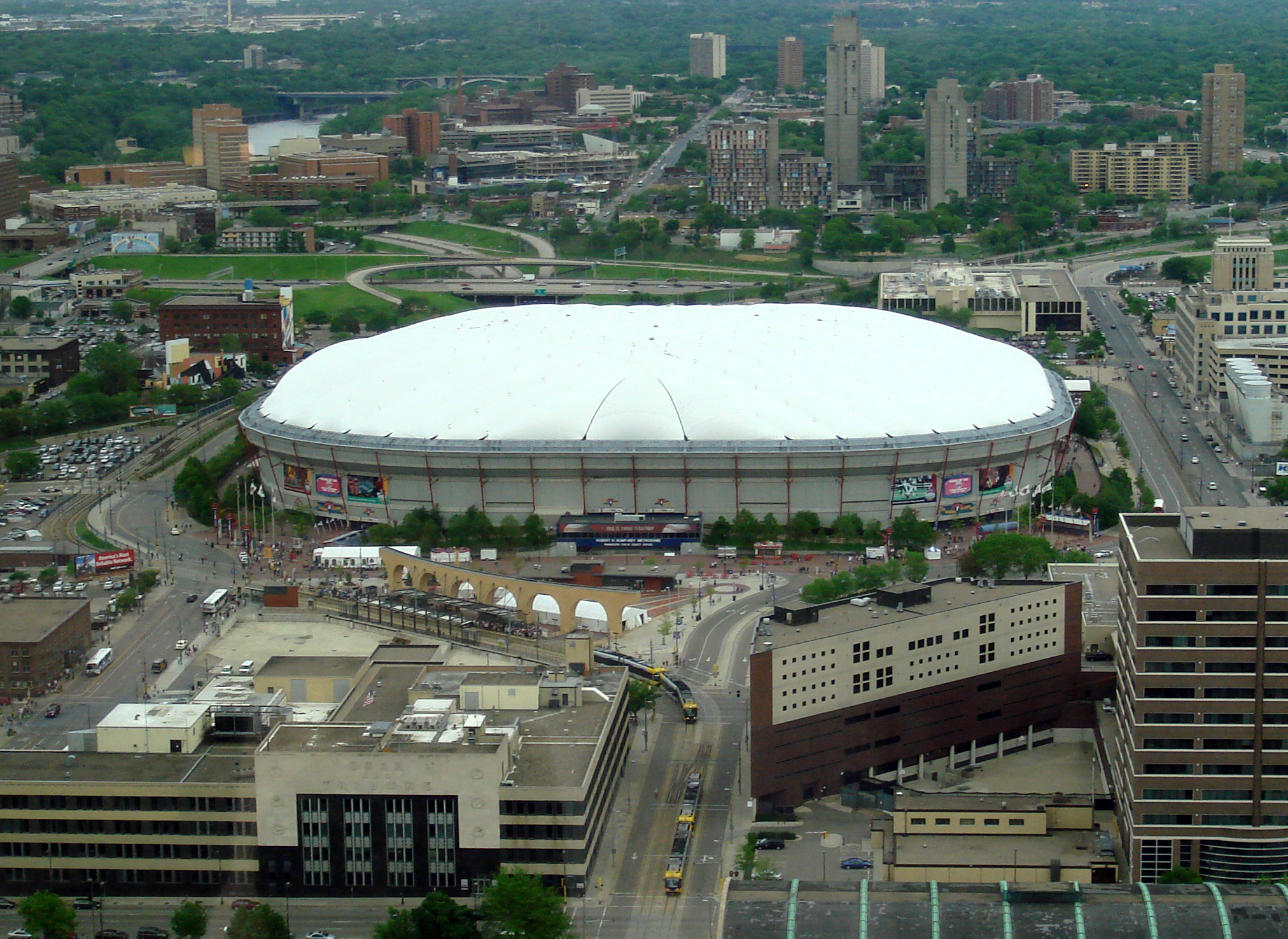
- Hubert H. Humphrey Metrodome in May 2007

- Location in Minnesota Location in the United States
- Address: 900 South 5th Street
- Location: Minneapolis, Minnesota
- Coordinates: 44°58′26″N 93°15′29″W
- Owner: Metropolitan Sports Facilities Commission (1982–2012); Minnesota Sports Facilities Authority (2012–2013)
- Operator: Metropolitan Sports Facilities Commission (1982–2012); Minnesota Sports Facilities Authority (2012–2013)
- Capacity: American football: 64,121; Baseball: 46,564 (expandable to 55,883); Basketball: 50,000; Concerts: 60,000
- Surface: SuperTurf (1982–1986); AstroTurf (1987–2003); FieldTurf (2004–2010); Sportexe Momentum Turf (2010); UBU-Intensity Series-S5-M Synthetic Turf (2011–2013)
- Field size: Left field: 343 ft (105 m); Left-center: 385 ft (117 m) (unmarked); Center field: 408 ft (124 m); Right-center: 367 ft (112 m) (unmarked); Right field: 327 ft (100 m); Backstop: 60 ft (18 m); Dome apex: 186 ft (57 m); Wall: 7 ft (2.1 m) (left and center field); Wall: 23 ft (7 m) (right field)

Construction
- Groundbreaking: December 20, 1979
- Opened: April 3, 1982; 44 years ago
- Closed: December 29, 2013; 12 years ago
- Demolished: January 18, 2014 – April 17, 2014
- Cost: US$55 million ($244 million in 2025 dollars)
- Architects: Fazlur Rahman Khan (Skidmore, Owings & Merrill); Setter, Leach & Lindstrom, Inc.
- Structural engineer: Geiger Berger Associates
- General contractor: Barton-Malow

Tenants
- Minnesota Vikings (NFL; 1982–2013); Minnesota Twins (MLB; 1982–2009); Minnesota Golden Gophers football (NCAA; 1982–2008); Minnesota Strikers (NASL; 1984); Minnesota Golden Gophers baseball (NCAA; 1985–2010, 2012–2013); Minnesota Timberwolves (NBA; 1989–1990); Minnesota United FC (NASL; 2013)

The Hubert H. Humphrey Metrodome, commonly called the Metrodome, was a domed sports stadium in downtown Minneapolis, Minnesota. It opened in 1982 as a replacement for Metropolitan Stadium, the former home of the National Football League's (NFL) Minnesota Vikings and Major League Baseball's (MLB) Minnesota Twins, and Memorial Stadium, the former home of the Minnesota Golden Gophers football team.

The Metrodome was the home of the Vikings from 1982 to 2013, the Twins from 1982 to 2009, the National Basketball Association's (NBA) Minnesota Timberwolves in their 1989–90 inaugural season, the Golden Gophers football team from 1982 to 2008, and the occasional home of the Golden Gophers baseball team from 1985 to 2010 and their full-time home in 2012. It was also the home of the Minnesota Strikers of the North American Soccer League in 1984. The Vikings played at the University of Minnesota's TCF Bank Stadium for the 2014 and 2015 NFL seasons, ahead of the planned opening of U.S. Bank Stadium in 2016.

The stadium had a fiberglass fabric roof that was self-supported by air pressure and was the third major sports facility to have this feature (the first two being the Pontiac Silverdome and the Carrier Dome). The Metrodome was similar in design to the former RCA Dome and to BC Place, though BC Place was reconfigured with a retractable roof in 2010. The Metrodome was the inspiration for the Tokyo Dome in Tokyo, Japan. The stadium was the only facility to have hosted a Super Bowl (1992), World Series (1987, 1991), MLB All-Star Game (1985), and NCAA Division I Basketball Final Four (1992, 2001).

The Metrodome had several nicknames such as "The Dome", "The Thunderdome", "The Homer Dome", and "The Technodome". Preparation for the demolition of the Metrodome began the day after the facility hosted its final home game for the Minnesota Vikings on December 29, 2013, and the roof was deflated and demolition began on January 18, 2014. The Metrodome was torn down in sections while construction of U.S. Bank Stadium began.

== History ==
=== Background ===
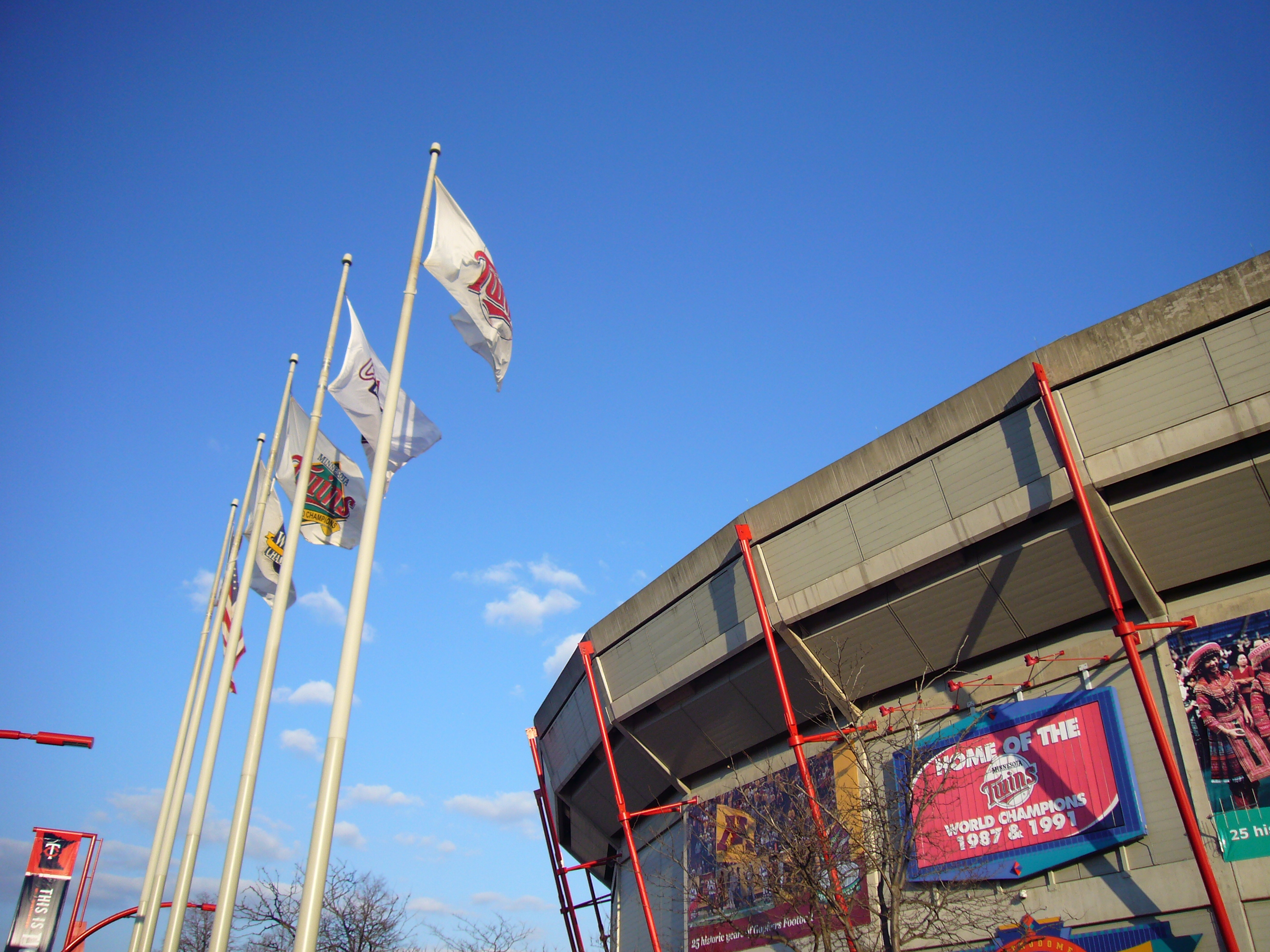
Exterior of the Metrodome

By the early 1970s, the Minnesota Vikings were unhappy with Metropolitan Stadium's (the Met) relatively small capacity for football. Before the completion of the AFL–NFL merger, the NFL declared that stadiums with a capacity under 50,000 were not adequate. The Met never held more than 49,700 people for football, and could not be expanded. At the time, the biggest stadium in the area was the University of Minnesota's Memorial Stadium. However, the Vikings were unwilling to be tenants in a college football stadium even on a temporary basis, and demanded a new venue. Supporters of a dome also believed that the Minnesota Twins would benefit from a climate-controlled stadium to insulate the team from harsh Minnesota weather later in their season. The Met would have likely needed to be replaced anyway, as it was not well maintained. Broken railings and seats could be seen in the upper deck by the 1970s; by its final season, they had become a distinct safety hazard.

Construction success of other domed stadiums, particularly the Pontiac Silverdome near Detroit, paved the way for voters to approve funding for a new stadium. Downtown Minneapolis was beginning a revitalization program, and the return of professional sports from suburban Bloomington was seen as a major success story; a professional team had not been based in downtown Minneapolis since the Minneapolis Lakers left for Los Angeles in 1960.

=== Construction ===
Construction on the Metrodome began on December 20, 1979, and was funded by a limited hotel-motel and liquor tax, local business donations, and payments established within a special tax district near the stadium site. Uncovering the Dome by Amy Klobuchar (now a U.S. Senator) describes the 10-year effort to build the venue. The stadium was named in memory of former mayor of Minneapolis, U.S. Senator, and U.S. Vice President Hubert Humphrey, who died in 1978. The building's construction was designed by Bangladeshi-American architect Fazlur Rahman Khan, of Skidmore, Owings & Merrill.

The Metrodome itself cost $68 million to build—significantly under budget—totaling around $124 million with infrastructure and other costs associated with the project added. It was a somewhat utilitarian facility, though not quite as spartan as Metropolitan Stadium. One stadium official once said that all the Metrodome was designed to do was "get fans in, let 'em see a game, and let 'em go home."

=== 1980s roof incidents ===
Five times in the stadium's history, heavy snows or other weather conditions significantly damaged the roof, with four of the instances causing it to deflate. Four of the five incidents occurred within the stadium's first five years of operation: On November 19, 1981, a rapid accumulation of over a foot of snow caused the roof to collapse, requiring it to be re-inflated. It deflated the following winter on December 30, 1982, because of a tear caused by a crane used in snow removal. This was four days before the Vikings played the Dallas Cowboys in the last regular-season game of the 1982 NFL season. In the spring following that same winter, on April 14, 1983, the Metrodome roof deflated because of a tear caused by late-season heavy snow, and the scheduled Twins game with the California Angels was postponed. On April 26, 1986, the Metrodome roof suffered a slight tear because of high winds, causing a nine-minute delay in the bottom of the seventh inning versus the Angels; however, the roof did not deflate.

=== 2010 roof incident and replacement ===
CCTV footage of the roof collapse.

A severe snowstorm arrived in Minneapolis in the late evening of December 10, 2010. The snowstorm lasted to the following night on December 11, with 17 in (43 cm) of snow accumulated across the city. Due to strong winds, hoses malfunctioning, and a hazardous slippery layer building up on the roof, workers were not allowed to remove the snow from the roof. As the workers were pulled back, many noticed that the roof's center was sagging down by the weight of the snow.

At around 5:00 a.m. CST on December 12, three of the roof's panels tore open. Snow fell through, covering the turf field. The night before the incident a Fox Sports crew, who were setting up for the football game between the New York Giants and Vikings, noticed water was leaking through the roof. They decided to leave their cameras on; the cameras captured footage of the roof deflation and the snow dropping to the field. The footage was aired on Fox NFL Sunday and quickly went viral.

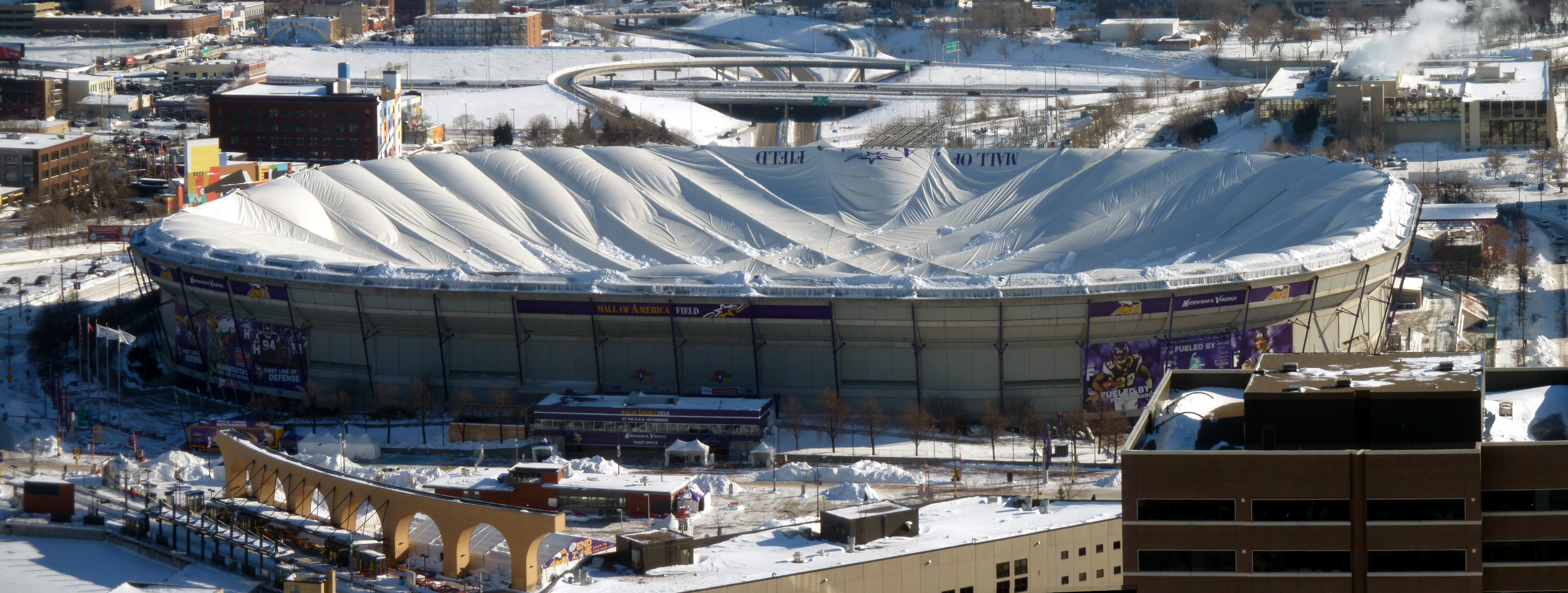
The deflated roof, a day after heavy snow and high winds from the December 11, 2010, blizzard caused it to tear and deflate

The game between the Vikings and Giants, scheduled to take place on December 12 during the afternoon, was postponed to the next day and relocated to Ford Field in Detroit. There were considerations moving the game to the University of Minnesota's nearby TCF Bank Stadium. However, the stadium had limited seating capacity, as well as snow that would have taken several days to clear. A couple of days later, a fourth panel ripped open, allowing more snow to enter the stadium. This forced another game between the Vikings and Chicago Bears (originally scheduled at the Metrodome on December 20) to be relocated to TCF Bank Stadium. The final two games for the Vikings for the season were on the road, and the Vikings were already eliminated from the playoffs, meaning no additional home games were to be played.

The roof collapse also caused schedule complications for the Golden Gophers baseball team. All Big Ten Conference home games were moved to Target Field, the home stadium of Major League Baseball's (MLB) Minnesota Twins. A Metrodome tournament was replaced with a three-game series against Gonzaga. Another tournament named the Dairy Queen Classic was relocated to Tucson, Arizona. Other changes included many home game cancellations, and some games being pushed to next year's season.

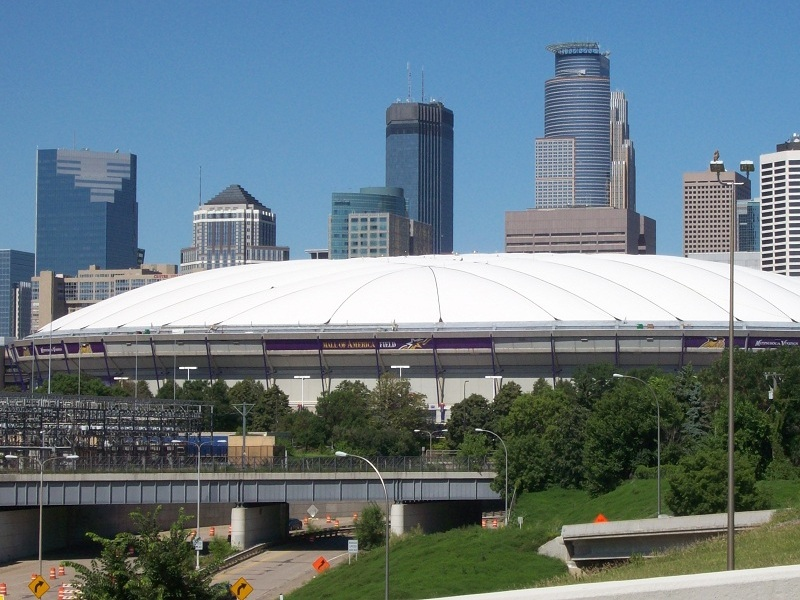
New roof in early August 2011

On February 10, 2011, it was announced that the entire Metrodome roof needed to be replaced at an estimated cost of $18 million. In November 2010, the University of Minnesota men's baseball team had announced plans to play all of their 2011 games at the Metrodome; however, the roof collapse caused those plans to be abandoned. On February 18, 2011, the Gophers announced that all 12 scheduled Big Ten home games in April and May would be played at Target Field, with three non-conference games moved to on-campus Siebert Field.

On July 13, 2011, it was announced that the roof was repaired and had been inflated that morning. However, other construction and repairs were still in progress. The remaining construction and repairs were done by August 1, 2011.

=== Demolition ===
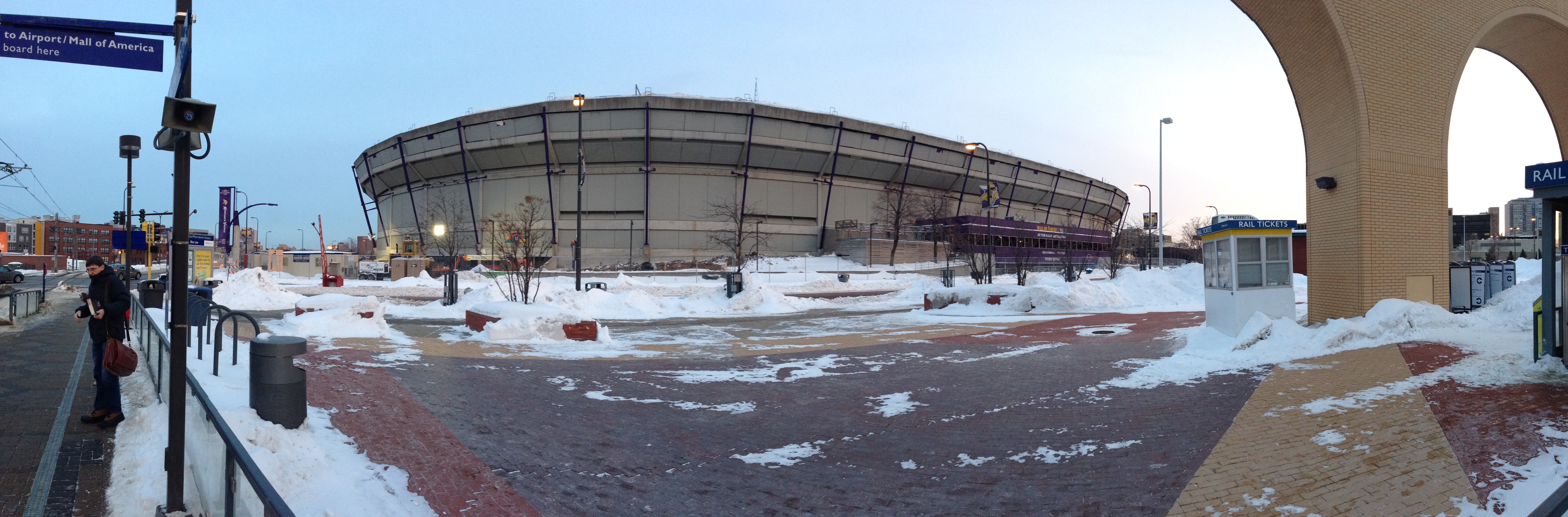
Roof deflated, the Metrodome on February 3, 2014.

With the approval of the new Vikings stadium at the Metrodome site by the Minnesota legislature, the fate of the Metrodome was sealed. The Vikings played their final game at the Metrodome on December 29, 2013, beating the Detroit Lions 14–13. The following day, a local company began removal of seats for sale to the public and various charities and nonprofits. Individual chairs went for $40 each to charities, $60 each to the public and $80 each for specific seat requests.

The roof was deflated for the final time on January 18. On the morning of February 2, 2014, the steel support cables that stretched from end-to-end of stadium that held together the roof were severed, as construction crews set off a simultaneous set of 42 explosive charges that detached the cables from the concrete structure. The general public was not informed about this phase of the demolition process, prompting about a half-dozen phone calls to police from people who wondered what was going on. This was viewed as the final step before the destruction of the concrete bowl of the Metrodome would begin. On February 10, 2014, shortly after 9:15 a.m., after more than two months of preliminary work that dated back all the way to the groundbreaking of the new Vikings stadium, demolition of the stadium walls finally began.

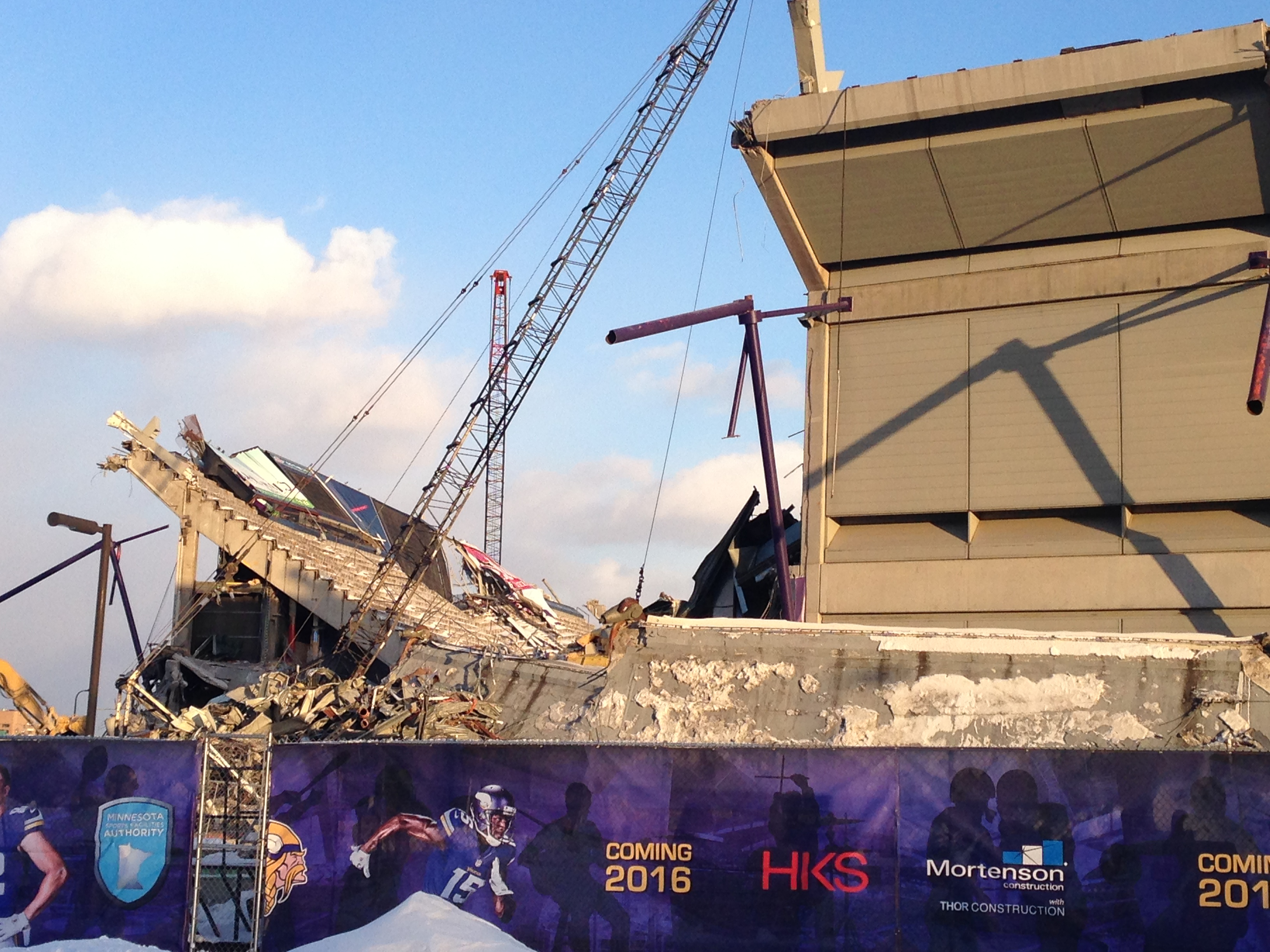
The Metrodome on February 26, 2014, with about half of its walls demolished. These are the north and west stands.

Just after 1 p.m. on February 17, 2014, one week after demolition of the stadium bowl had begun, demolition crews were working on taking down the concrete ring beam that encircled to top of the Metrodome, when a portion of the ring beam collapsed out of sequence, bringing an immediate halt to the work. No one was hurt and no equipment was damaged by the collapse. After five days of investigation from structural and demolition experts, it was decided that the remaining portion of the concrete ring beam would be destroyed using controlled explosive charges—virtually the same method that was used to bring down the Metrodome's steel support cables for the roof. This second controlled explosion was a continued deviation from the original plan to not use explosives to destroy the stadium, as it was determined that this was the safest way to bring down the remaining ring beam structure. On February 23, 2014, the remaining ring beam and corners of the Metrodome were brought down with 84 explosive charges of dynamite. This enabled demolition crews to continue with the wrecking ball demolition method that was originally chosen (though the order in which the sections would be brought down were changed as a result of the ring beam implosion), to bring down what was left of the Metrodome. Despite this unexpected setback, Mortenson Construction said that the demolition of the Metrodome and construction of U.S. Bank Stadium were both still on schedule.

On March 15, 2014, the final upper deck bleachers and concrete bleacher-support girders (on the northwest side of the Metrodome) were brought down, taking away any standing remnants of the exterior stadium walls. On April 11, 2014, the final portion of the inner-stadium concrete walls were reduced to rubble, marking the official end of the Hubert H. Humphrey Metrodome. Demolition of the Metrodome was formally declared complete six days later—a month ahead of schedule—as the final truckload of rubble was loaded up and removed from the new stadium construction site. Officials from Mortenson Construction said the entire demolition job required 4,910 truckloads and 16,000 man hours to complete the job.

=== Usage ===
The Metrodome is the only venue to have hosted an MLB All-Star Game (1985), a Super Bowl (1992), the NCAA Final Four (1992 & 2001), and the World Series (1987 & 1991).

The NCAA Final Four was held at the Metrodome in 1992 and 2001. The Metrodome also served as one of the four regional venues for the NCAA Division I Basketball Championship in 1986, 1989, 1996, 2000, 2003, 2006, and 2009. The dome also held first- and second-round games in the NCAA basketball tournament in addition to regionals and the Final Four, most recently in 2009.

The Metrodome was recognized as one of the loudest venues in which to view a game, due in part to the fact that sound was recycled throughout the stadium because of the fabric domed roof. Stadium loudness is a sports marketing issue, as the noise lends the home team a home advantage against the visiting team. Until its demolition, the Metrodome was the loudest domed NFL stadium; most notably, during the 1987 World Series and 1991 World Series, peak decibel levels were measured at 125 and 118 respectively compared to a jet airliner—both close to the threshold of pain.

The 1991 World Series is considered one of the best of all time. The blue colored seat back and bottom where Kirby Puckett's 1991 World Series Game 6 walk-off home run landed in Section 101, Row 5, Seat 27 (renumbered 34 after the home run in honor of Kirby's uniform number), is now in the Twins archives, along with the gold-colored back and bottom that replaced it for several years. The Twins reinstalled a blue seat back and bottom as well as Puckett's #34 on the seat where it remained until the final Vikings game of 2013 in the Metrodome when, as local media reported, a fan took the #34 plate off the seat. The original World Series armrests and hardware, as well as the replacement blue seat back and bottom, are now part of a private Kirby Puckett collection in Minnesota.

== Features ==
From the time the stadium was built to when it was demolished, the economics of sports marketing changed. Teams began charging higher prices for tickets and demanding more amenities, such as bigger clubhouses and locker rooms, more luxury suites, and more concession revenue. Team owners, the media, and fans pressured the State of Minnesota to provide newer, better facilities to host its teams. The Metrodome served its primary purpose: to provide a climate-controlled facility to host the three sports tenants in Minnesota with the largest attendance.

For Major League baseball, the Metrodome was regarded as a hitter's park, with a low (7 ft) left-field fence (343 ft) that favored right-handed power hitters, and the higher (23 ft) but closer (327 ft) right-field Baggie that favored left-handed power hitters. It gave up even more home runs before air conditioning was installed in 1983. Before 1983, the Dome had been nicknamed "the Sweat Box". The Metrodome was climate controlled, and protected the baseball schedule during the entire time it was the venue for the Minnesota Twins. Major League Baseball schedulers had the luxury of being able to count on dates played at Metrodome. Doubleheader games only occurred when purposely scheduled. The last time that happened was when the Twins scheduled a day-night doubleheader against the Kansas City Royals on August 31, 2007. The doubleheader was necessitated after an August 2 game vs. Kansas City was postponed one day after the I-35W Bridge collapse in downtown Minneapolis.

=== Roof ===
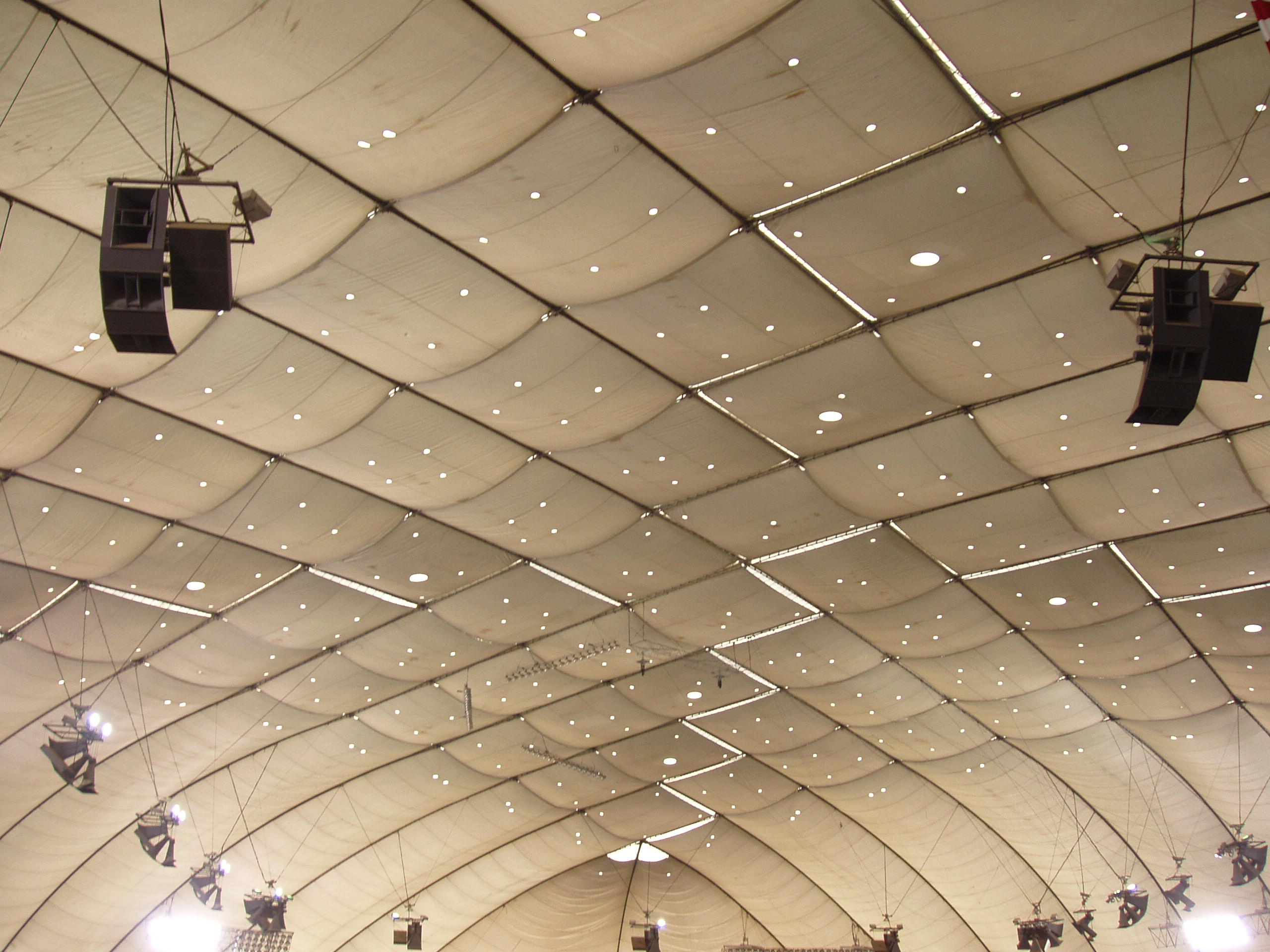
Metrodome roof (1982–2010)

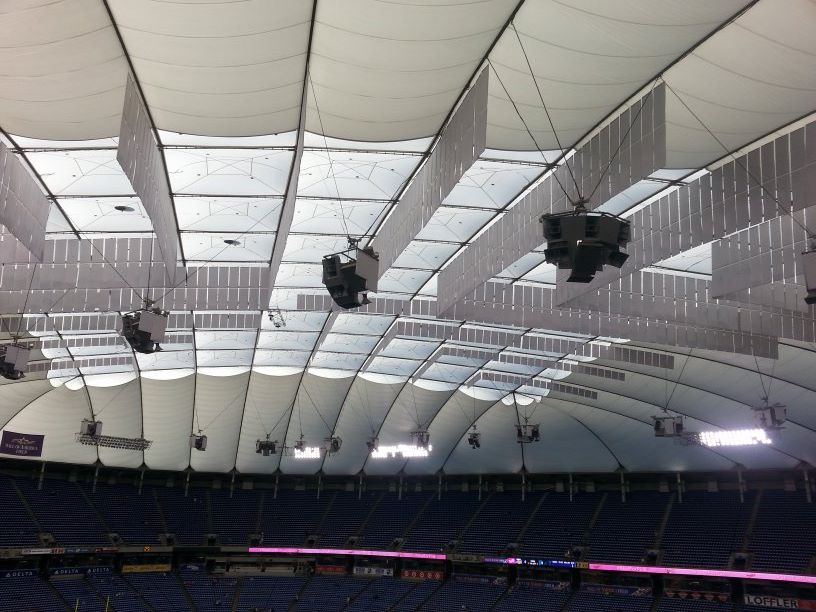
Metrodome roof (2011–2013)

The Metrodome's air-supported roof was designed by the inventor of air-supported structures, David H. Geiger, through his New York-based Geiger Berger Associates, and manufactured and installed by Birdair Structures. An air-supported structure supported by positive air pressure, it required 250,000 ft^{3}/min (120 m^{3}/s) of air to keep it inflated. The air pressure was supplied by 20 fans of 90 hp (67 kW) each. The roof was made of two layers: the outer layers were Teflon-coated fiberglass and the inner was a proprietary acoustical fabric. By design, the dead air space between the layers insulated the roof; in winter, warm air was blown into space between layers to help melt snow that had accumulated on top. At the time it was built, the 10 acres (4.0 ha) of fabric made the roof the largest expanse ever done in that manner. The outside Teflon membrane was 1/32 of an inch thick and the inner liner of woven fiberglass was 1/64 of an inch thick. The entire roof weighed roughly 580,000 pounds (260,000 kg). It reached 195 ft (59 m), or about 16 stories, at its highest point.

To prevent roof tears like those that occurred in its first years of service, the Metropolitan Sports Facilities Commission adopted a twofold strategy: When snow accumulation was expected, hot air was pumped into the space between the roof's two layers. Workers also climbed on the roof and used steam and high-powered hot-water hoses to melt snow. In addition, before the storm that caused the December 2010 collapse, the inside of the stadium was heated to nearly 80 °F (26.7 °C).

To maintain the differential air pressure, spectators usually entered and left the seating and concourse areas through revolving doors, since the use of regular doors without an airlock would have caused significant loss of air pressure. The double-walled construction allowed warmed air to circulate beneath the top of the dome, melting accumulated snow. A sophisticated environmental control center in the lower part of the stadium was staffed to monitor the weather and make adjustments in air distribution to maintain the roof.

Because it was unusually low to the playing field, the air-inflated dome occasionally figured into game action during baseball games. Major League Baseball had specific ground rules for the Metrodome. Any ball which struck the Dome roof, or objects hanging from it, remained in play; if it landed in foul territory it became a foul ball, if it landed in fair territory it became a fair ball. Any ball which became caught in the roof over fairground was a ground rule double. That has only happened three times in its history – Dave Kingman for the Oakland Athletics on May 4, 1984, the University of Minnesota Gophers player George Behr and Corey Koskie in 2004. The speakers, being closer to the playing surface, were hit more frequently, especially the speakers in foul ground near the infield, which were typically hit several times a season, which posed an extra challenge to infielders trying to catch them. However, beginning with the 2005 season, the ground rules for Twins games were changed such that any batted ball that struck a speaker in the foul territory would automatically be called a foul ball, regardless of whether or not it was caught.

The dome’s roof color made fly balls nearly impossible to track. As a result, fielders frequently lost sight of them against the roof. An example of this is seen in a home run derby put on by a softball entertainment crew before a Twins game. Taken at the field level, the balls generally tended to be lost in the roof.

=== The field ===
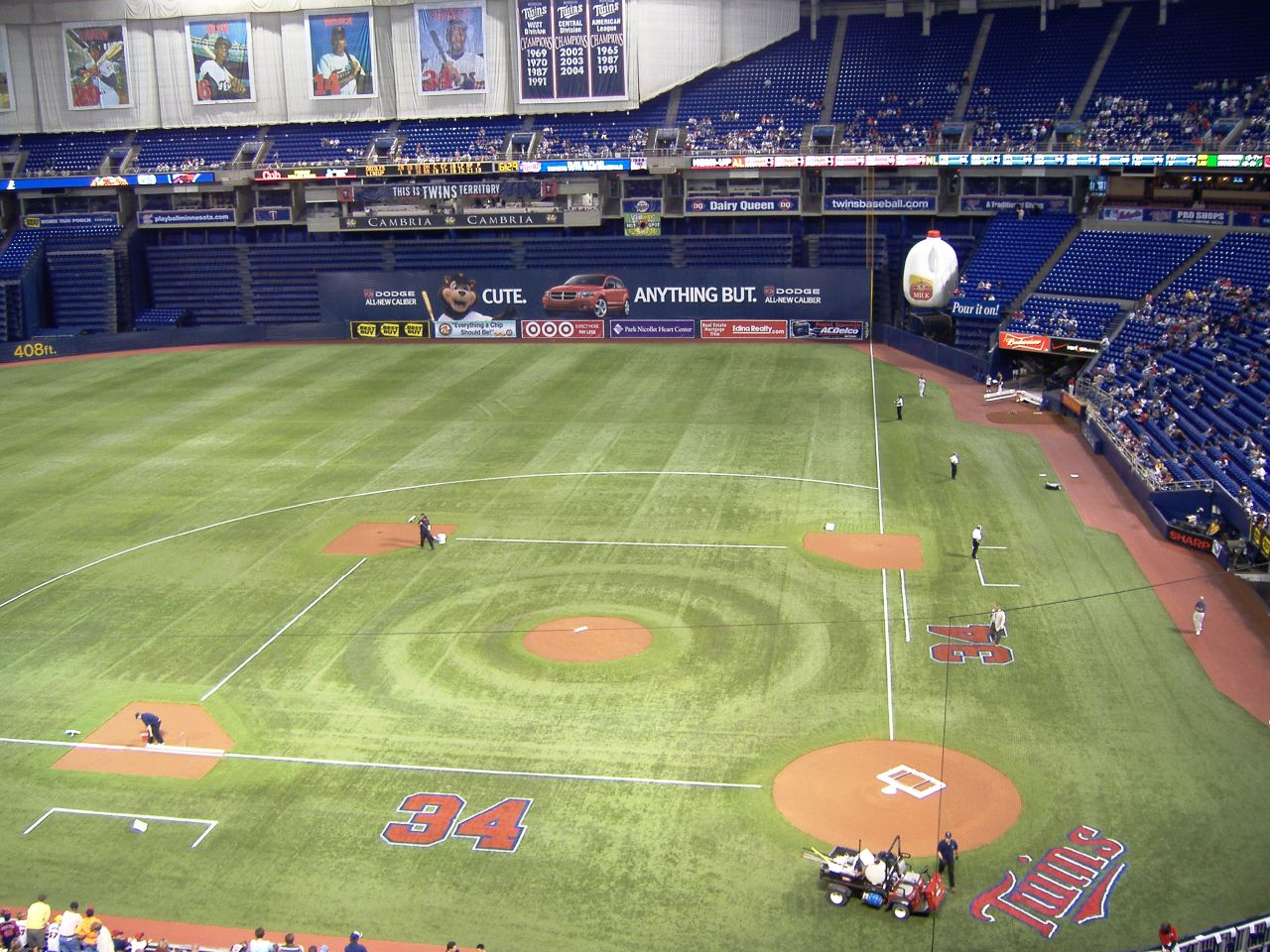
Metrodome field, in its baseball configuration. The football markings are slightly visible under the turf.

During its early years of operation, the field at the Metrodome was surfaced with SuperTurf. The surface, also known as SporTurf, was very bouncy—so bouncy, in fact, that Billy Martin once protested a game after seeing a base hit that would normally be a pop single turn into a ground-rule double. Baseball and football players alike complained that it was too hard.

This surface was upgraded to AstroTurf in 1987, and in 2004, the sports commission had a newer artificial surface, called FieldTurf, installed. FieldTurf is thought to be a closer approximation to natural grass than Astroturf in its softness, appearance, and feel. A new Sportexe Momentum Turf surface was installed during the summer of 2010.

When the conversion between football and baseball took place, the pitcher's mound was raised and lowered by an electric motor. The mound weighed 23,000 pounds (10,000 kg) and was 18 feet (5.5 m) in diameter. With the field repair, the sliding pits and pitcher's mound used by the Twins and Gophers were removed. Any future baseball games would see baserunners slide on "grass". The home plate area was kept, as it was not "in-play" for football configuration. The original home plate installed at the dome was memorably dug up after the Twins' final game and has been installed at Target Field. A new field was installed in the summer of 2011 due to the damage from the December 2010 roof collapse.

=== Plexiglas ===
From 1985 to 1994, the left-field wall included a 6-foot (1.8 m) clear Plexiglas screen for a total height of 13 feet (4.0 m). It was off this Plexiglas wall that Twins player Kirby Puckett jumped to rob Ron Gant of the Atlanta Braves of an extra-base hit during Game 6 of the 1991 World Series (a game that Puckett would win with an 11th-inning walk-off homer) – in later years, with the Plexiglas removed, it would have been a potential home run ball.

=== Stadium neighborhood ===
The Metrodome was constructed in an area of downtown Minneapolis known as "Industry Square". Development in the Downtown East neighborhood around Metrodome took many years to materialize. For many years, there were few bars or restaurants nearby where fans could gather, and tailgating was expressly forbidden in most parking areas. The City of Minneapolis was directing the development of the entertainment districts along with Seven Corners in Cedar-Riverside, Hennepin Avenue, and the Warehouse district. The Metrodome existed among several parking areas built upon old rail yards, along with defunct factories and warehouses. The Star Tribune owns several blocks nearby that have remained parking lots. The Metrodome was not connected to the Minneapolis Skyway System, although that had been proposed in 1989 to be completed in time to host Super Bowl XXVI. The Star Tribune properties and the Minneapolis Armory had not been developed and stood between the Metrodome and the rest of Downtown Minneapolis. Only in recent years did redevelopment begin moving Southeast to reach the Metrodome. More restaurants, hotels, and condominiums have been built nearby. The METRO Blue Line light rail connected the Minneapolis entertainment district with the Metrodome and the Airport.

=== Sight lines ===
The Metrodome was not a true multi-purpose stadium. Rather, it was built as a football stadium that could convert into a baseball stadium. The seating configuration was almost rectangular in shape, with the baseball field tucked into one corner. The seats along the four straight sides directly faced their corresponding seats on the opposite side, while the seats in the corners were four quarter-circles.

While this was more than suitable for the Vikings and Gophers, with few exceptions this resulted in poor sightlines for baseball. For instance, the seats directly along the left-field line faced the center field and right field fences. Unlike other major league parks, there were no seats down to field level. Only 8,000 seats were located in the lower deck between home plate and the dugouts, where most game action occurs. Seats in these areas were popularly known as "the baseball section." However, even the closest front-row seats were at least 5 or 6 feet (1.5 or 1.8 m) above the field.

The way that many seats were situated forced some fans to crane their necks to see the area between the pitcher's mound and home plate. Some fans near the foul poles had to turn more than 80°, compared to less than 70° with the original Yankee Stadium or 75° at Camden Yards. For that reason, the seats down the left-field line were typically among the last ones sold; the (less expensive) outfield lower deck seating tended to fill up sooner. Nearly 1,400 seats were at least partially obstructed – some of them due to the right-field upper deck being directly above (and somewhat overhanging) the folded-up football seats behind right field; and some of them due to steel beams in the back rows of the upper deck which are part of the dome's support system.

On the plus side, there was relatively little foul territory, which was not typical of most domed stadiums (especially those primarily built for football). Also, with the infield tucked into one corner of the stadium, the seats in the so-called "baseball section" had some of the closest views in Major League Baseball. In 2007, the Twins began selling seats in extra rows behind the plate which were previously only used for football. The sight lines were also very good in the right field corner, which faced the infield and was closer to the action than the left field corner.

Unlike most domed stadiums, the Metrodome's baseball configuration had asymmetrical outfield dimensions.

The Twins stopped selling most of the seats in sections 203–212 of the upper level in 1996. This area was usually curtained off during the regular season. However, the stadium could easily be expanded to full capacity for the postseason, or when popular opponents came to town during the regular season.

=== Scheduling conflicts ===
As part of the deal with Metrodome, the Minnesota Twins had post-season priority over the Gophers in scheduling. If the Twins were in the playoffs with a home series, the baseball game took priority and the Gopher football game had to be moved to a time suitable to allow the grounds crew to convert the playing field and the stands to the football configuration.

The last month of Major League Baseball's regular season often included one or two Saturdays in which the Twins and Gophers used Metrodome on the same day. On those occasions, the Twins game would start at about 11 a.m. Central time (TV announcer Dick Bremer sometimes joked that the broadcast was competing with SpongeBob SquarePants). Afterward, the conversion took place and the Gophers football game started at about 6 p.m. The University of Minnesota was the only school in the Big Ten that shared a football facility with professional sports teams for an extended period of years.

In 2007, there were two such schedule conflicts, on September 1 and 22. In 2008, there were no conflicts on the regular-season schedule.

Due to the minimum time needed to convert the field, a baseball game that ran long in clock time had to be suspended, and concluded the next day. The only time this happened was on October 2, 2004, when a game between the Twins and Indians reached the end of the 11th inning after 2:30 pm in a tie and resumed the next day. This was done in order to get the stadium ready for a Golden Gophers football game against Penn State that took place that same night.

The Vikings had rights to the Dome over the Twins except for World Series games. In 1987, the Vikings switched home dates with their division rival, the Tampa Bay Buccaneers, as their original home date for week 6 was scheduled for the same day as Game 2 of the World Series, and the Vikings' game with the Denver Broncos scheduled for the same day as Game 7 was pushed back to the following Monday night. The Vikings then played the Buccaneers at home in week 10 instead.

The Twins' 2009 AL Central division tiebreaker with the Detroit Tigers was played on Tuesday, October 6, 2009. One-game playoffs are normally held the day after the regular season ends (in this case, the season ended on Sunday, October 4), but the Vikings were using Metrodome for Monday Night Football on October 5. The Twins were awarded the right to host the tiebreaker because they won the season series against Detroit.

=== Seating capacity ===
Years	Baseball	Football	Basketball
1982	54,711	62,220	NA
1983	54,711	62,220	NA
1984	55,122	62,345	NA
1985	55,122	62,345	NA
1986	55,244	62,345	NA
1987	55,244	62,345	NA
1988	55,244	63,669	NA
1989	55,883	63,669	NA
1990	55,883	63,669	NA
1991	55,883	63,669	NA
1992	55,883	63,669	NA
1993	55,883	63,669	NA
1994	55,883	63,669	NA
1995	56,783	64,035	NA
1996	44,457	64,035	NA
1997	48,678	64,153	NA
1998	48,678	64,153	35,000
1999	48,678	64,153	35,000
2000	48,678	64,121	NA
2001	48,678	64,121	NA
2002	48,678	64,121	NA
2003	48,678	64,121	NA
2004	45,423	64,121	NA
2005	45,423	64,121	NA
2006	45,423	64,121	NA
2007	45,423	64,121	NA
2008	45,423	64,121	NA
2009	45,423	64,121	NA
2010	NA	64,121	NA
2011	NA	64,121	NA
2012	NA	64,121	NA
2013	NA	64,121	NA

== Stadium usage ==
=== Minnesota Vikings football ===
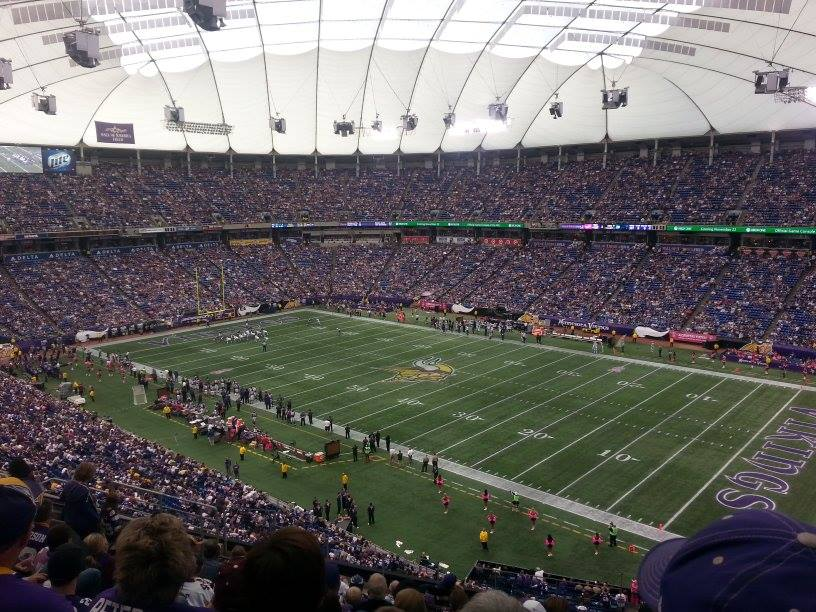
Inside the Metrodome during a Vikings game in 2013.

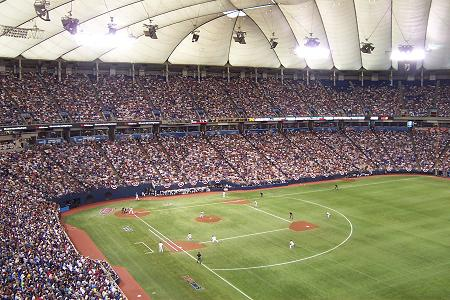
Action during a Twins game during the 2004 American League Division Series

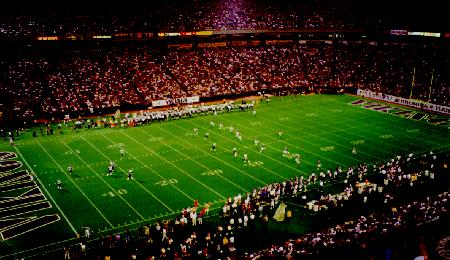
Action during a 1999 Vikings game, from a location similar to 2004 ALDS photo. Note the retractable seats in the lower-right portion of this photo.

As the stadium was designed first and foremost for the Minnesota Vikings, they had the fewest problems. However, the economics of 21st century professional sports meant that the Vikings owners wanted more luxury suites and better concessions. Renovations were rejected twice, with the 2001 price tag at $269 million.

The Vikings played their first game at the Metrodome in a preseason matchup against the Seattle Seahawks on August 21, 1982. Minnesota won 7–3. The first touchdown in the dome was scored by Joe Senser on an 11-yard pass from Tommy Kramer. The first regular-season game at the Metrodome was the 1982 opener on September 12, when the Vikings defeated the Tampa Bay Buccaneers, 17–10. Rickey Young scored the first regular-season touchdown in the dome on a 3-yard run in the 2nd quarter. On January 9, 1983, the Vikings defeated the Atlanta Falcons, 30–24, in a 1st-round game that was the first playoff game at the Metrodome. On January 17, 1999, the Falcons defeated the Vikings in the first NFC championship game played at the Metrodome. On December 29, 2013, the Vikings played their final game at the Metrodome, a 14–13 victory over the Detroit Lions. The team's record at the dome was 162–88 in the regular season and 6–4 in playoff games. They finished with a perfect record at the dome against the Arizona Cardinals (8–0), Baltimore Ravens (1–0), Cincinnati Bengals (4–0), and Houston Texans (1–0), but with a winless record there against the New York Jets (0–3).

==== Super Bowl XXVI ====
NFL owners voted during their May 24, 1989, meeting to award Super Bowl XXVI to Minneapolis over Indianapolis, Pontiac and Seattle. The game on January 26, 1992, was the second Super Bowl to be played in a cold, winter climate city. The first one was Super Bowl XVI on January 24, 1982, in Pontiac, Michigan. Super Bowl XXVI resulted in the Washington Redskins defeating the Buffalo Bills, 37–24.

=== Minnesota Twins baseball ===
Pre-game activities at a Vikings game in December 2007.

When opened in 1982, the Metrodome was appreciated for the protection it gave from mosquitoes, and later the weather. Over the years there had been a love-hate relationship with the fans, sportswriters, and stadium. The Minnesota Twins won two World Series championships at the Metrodome. The Twins won the 1987 World Series and 1991 World Series by winning all four games held at the Dome in both seasons. The loud noise, white roof, quick turf, and the right-field wall (or "Baggie") provided a substantial home-field advantage for the Twins. The 1991 World Series has been considered one of the best of all time.

For Twins baseball, the address of the Metrodome became 34 Kirby Puckett Place, an honor given to one of the most famous Minnesota Twins players. In 1996, a section of Chicago Avenue in front of the Metrodome was renamed Kirby Puckett Place by the city of Minneapolis. The Metrodome Plaza was added along Kirby Puckett Place before the 1996 season. Before that, the address for the Twins was 501 Chicago Avenue South. For baseball, the Metrodome informally has been called "The House That Puck Built".

By 2001, several newer purpose-built Major League Baseball stadiums had been constructed, and the Metrodome was considered to be among the worst venues in Major League Baseball.

Only two Twins games at the Metrodome were ever postponed. The first was on April 14, 1983, when a massive snowstorm prevented the California Angels from getting to Minneapolis. The game would have likely been postponed in any case, however; that night heavy snow caused part of the roof to collapse. The second was on August 2, 2007, the day after the I-35W Mississippi River bridge had collapsed a few blocks away from the Metrodome. The game scheduled for August 1 was played as scheduled (about one hour after the bridge had collapsed) because the team and police officials were concerned about too many fans departing Metrodome at one time, potentially causing conflict with rescue workers. The August 2 ceremonial groundbreaking at the eventual Target Field was also postponed, for the same reason. The Metrodome carried a memorial decal on the backstop wall for the remainder of the 2007 season.

The Twins played their final scheduled regular-season game at the Metrodome on October 4, 2009, beating the Kansas City Royals, 13–4. After the game, they held their scheduled farewell celebration. Because they ended the day tied with the Detroit Tigers for first place in the American League Central, a one-game playoff between the teams was played there on October 6, 2009, with the Twins beating the Tigers 6–5 in 12 innings. The division clincher would be the Twins' last win at the Metrodome. The announced crowd was 54,088, setting the regular-season attendance record.

The final Twins game at the Metrodome was on October 11, 2009, when they lost to the New York Yankees 4–1, resulting in a three-game sweep in the 2009 ALDS. The Twins' appearance in this series gave Metrodome the distinction of being the first American League stadium to end its Major League Baseball history with post-season play. The only other stadiums whose final games came in the postseason are Fulton County Stadium in Atlanta (1996), the Astrodome in Houston (1999) and Busch Memorial Stadium in St. Louis (2005), all of which were home venues for National League teams. With the departure of the Twins, this leaves the Tampa Bay Rays as the last remaining major league team to play their games in a non-retractable domed stadium.

=== Basketball ===
When configured as a basketball arena, the fans in the nearby bleachers got a suitable view of the court, but the action was difficult to see in the upper decks. Concessions were very far away from the temporary infrastructure, and the NCAA never attempted the 50 yard-line center court configuration using all stadium seating the tournament utilizes today. The Metrodome as a basketball arena was much larger than most NBA and major college basketball arenas, which run to about 20,000 seats; it functioned like Syracuse's large Carrier Dome. However, the NCAA made a significant amount of money selling the high number of seats for regional and championship games for the men's basketball tournament.

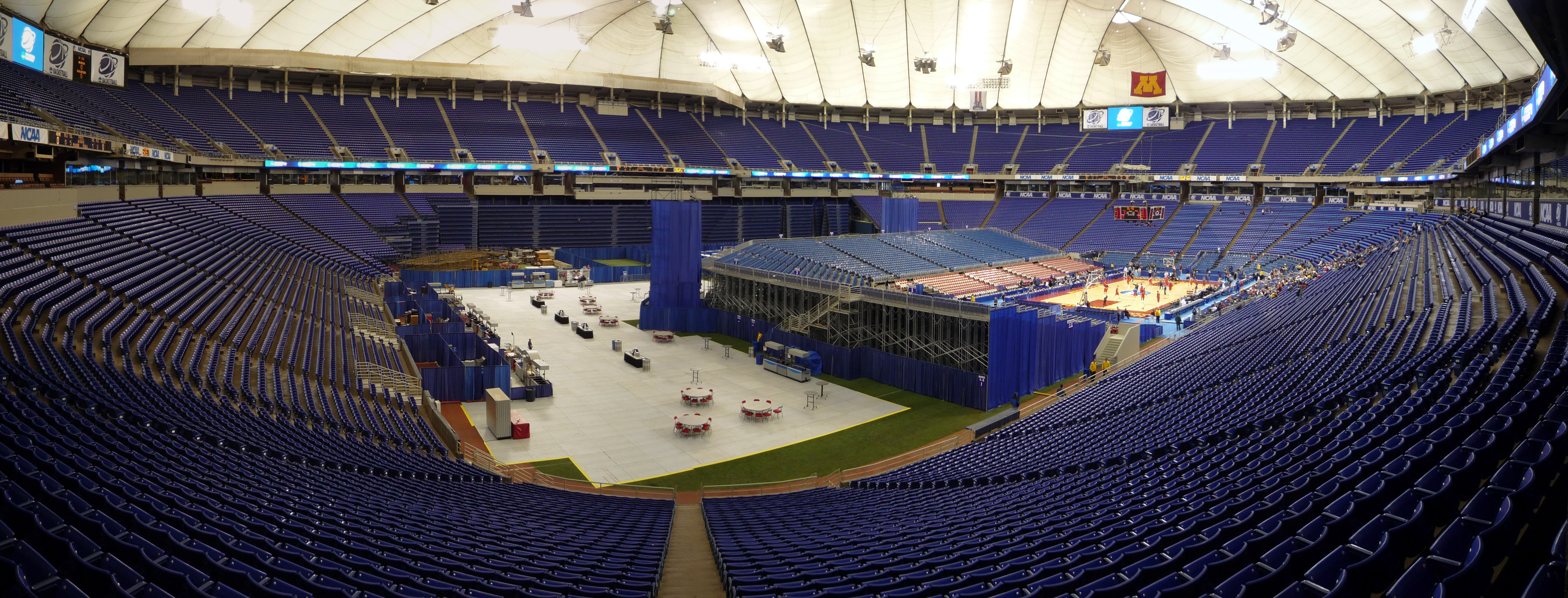
Metrodome set up for the 2009 NCAA men's basketball tournament; temporary stands enclose the basketball court on two sides with the permanent stands on the other two.

Ten NCAA tournaments took place at the stadium:

- 1986 1st and 2nd round
- 1989 Midwest Regional
- 1991 1st and 2nd round
- 1992 Final Four
- 1996 Midwest Regional
- 2000 1st and 2nd round
- 2001 Final Four
- 2003 Midwest Regional
- 2006 Minneapolis Regional
- 2009 1st and 2nd round

The Timberwolves used the stadium for their home games during their inaugural season (1989–90) in the NBA while the team waited for construction of Target Center to be completed. The team set NBA records for the highest single-season attendance ever: 1,072,572 fans in 41 home games. The largest crowd for a single game occurred on April 17, 1990: 49,551 fans watched the T-Wolves lose to the Denver Nuggets in the last game of the season. This was the third-largest crowd in the NBA's history.

=== College football ===
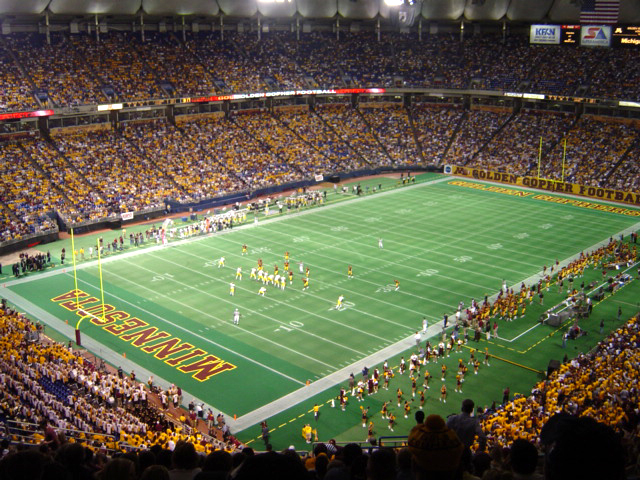
Metrodome during a Gophers game in 2003.

Beginning in the 1982 college football season, the University of Minnesota Golden Gophers began playing their home football games at the Metrodome. The first game was a 57–3 victory over the Ohio Bobcats on September 11, 1982. The Gophers football record at the Metrodome 1982–2008 (27 seasons) 169 total games 87–80–2 .521%. 109 Big Ten Conference games 41–66–2 .385%

With the Gophers' move to TCF Bank Stadium, only one Power Four program still plays in a domed stadium. Syracuse has its own such facility on campus. When the Gophers first moved to the Metrodome, the NFL-class facilities were seen as an improvement over the aging Memorial Stadium. Initially, attendance increased. However, fans waxed nostalgic over fall days playing outdoors on campus. Huntington Bank Stadium now provides an outdoor, on-campus venue for the team.

Other local colleges used the Metrodome on occasion. The last college football game in the Metrodome was a Division III playoff game on November 23, 2013 when top-ranked Bethel defeated St. Scholastica.

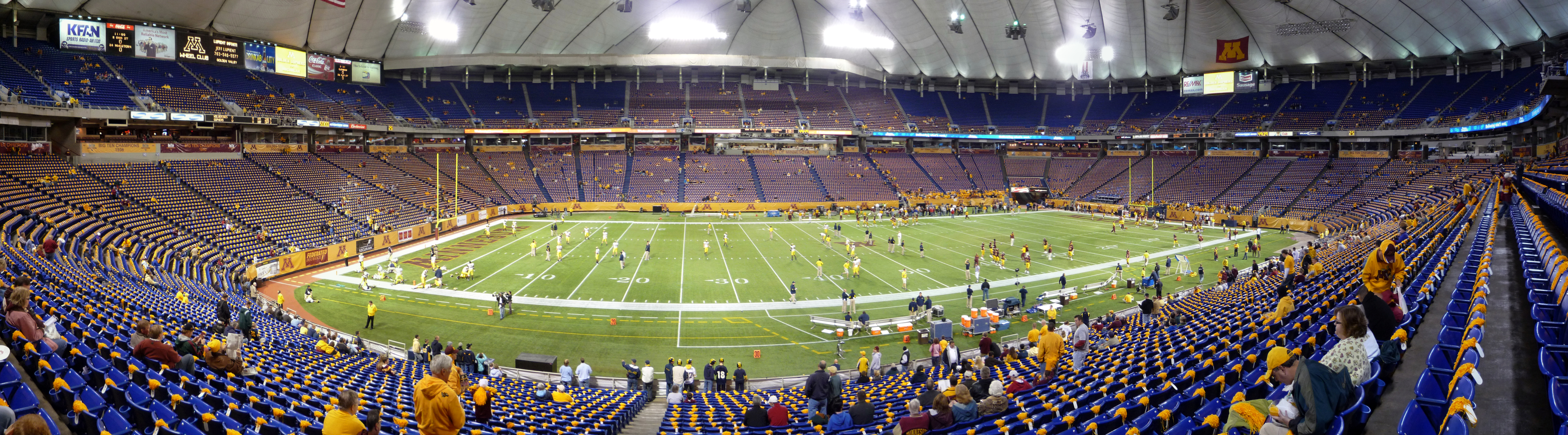
The Metrodome in 2008, before the 91st battle for the Little Brown Jug rivalry game between the Minnesota Golden Gophers and Michigan Wolverines.

=== College baseball ===
In the 2010 season, the University of Minnesota Golden Gopher Baseball team played all of their home games at the Metrodome (except a game at the new Target Field on March 27, 2010). The University of Minnesota Golden Gophers baseball team had played games at the Metrodome during February and March since 1985 because of weather. Later games were played at Siebert Field, except for 2006 when all but two home games were played at the Metrodome. The team often played major tournaments at the Dome, which included the Dairy Queen Classic, where three other major Division I baseball teams play in an invitational. Before the NCAA's 2008 rule in Division I regarding the start of the college baseball season, the Golden Gophers would often play home games at the Metrodome earlier than other teams in the area to neutralize the advantage of warmer-weather schools starting their seasons earlier in the year. Some early Big Ten conference games were played at the Metrodome, and the Golden Gophers enjoyed home-field advantage during the early part of the season before the weather warmed, and the Gophers could play games on-campus. Other small colleges also played games in the stadium during the weeks before the Metrodome was open for Division I play. In 2010, 420 amateur baseball and softball games—including the majority of the Golden Gophers' home schedule—were played at the Metrodome.

The size of Siebert Field also affected the Golden Gophers starting in 2010. The Golden Gophers last hosted an NCAA baseball tournament regional in 2000, with temporary seating added. With the Metrodome being available for the tournament starting in 2010, the team could easily place a bid for, and have a better possibility of hosting, an NCAA baseball regional or super regional.

Other cold-weather teams have played at the Metrodome. Big 12 Conference member Kansas has played two series (2007 and 2010) at the Metrodome because of inclement weather against South Dakota State University and Eastern Michigan, respectively.

=== Soccer ===
The Minnesota Kicks were supposed to move into the Metrodome for the 1982 NASL season. However, the franchise folded in November 1981. The Minnesota Strikers played the 1984 NASL season at the Dome. 52,621 saw the Minnesota Strikers defeat Tampa Bay 1–0 on May 28, 1984. MSHSL boys and girls soccer championships were also held at the stadium. The Minnesota Thunder played selected games at the Dome from 1990 to 2009. Minnesota Stars FC, later renamed to Minnesota United FC, opened their 2012 season at the stadium and used it for the 2013 NASL spring season. The field dimensions for soccer at the Metrodome were 110 by 70 yards (101 m × 64 m). The largest crowd to see a soccer game in Minnesota was at the Metrodome.

=== Large concerts ===
The concert capacity of the Metrodome was around 60,000 people, depending on seating and stage configurations, which made it a profitable location for stadium tours during the late 80s and 90s. By comparison, the Target Center in Minneapolis has a concert capacity of up to 20,500. Acoustics at the Metrodome for these concerts were "iffy at best".

Date	Artist	Opening act(s)	Name	Revenue	Notes
May 28, 1984	Beach Boys	—	—	—	
June 26, 1986	Grateful Dead; Bob Dylan	Tom Petty & the Heartbreakers	—	$185,000	
May 24, 1988	Pink Floyd	—	A Momentary Lapse of Reason Tour	$938,768	
July 13, 1988	Van Halen; Scorpions	Metallica; Dokken; Kingdom Come	Monsters of Rock Tour 1988	—	
November 29, 1989	The Rolling Stones	Living Colour	Steel Wheels Tour	$2,976,592	
November 30, 1989	The Rolling Stones	Living Colour	Steel Wheels Tour	$2,976,592	
June 10, 1992	Genesis	—	We Can't Dance Tour	—	
September 15, 1992	Guns N' Roses; Metallica	Faith No More	Guns N' Roses/Metallica Stadium Tour	$1,190,530	
May 23, 1993	Paul McCartney	—	The New World Tour	$1,187,680	
June 22, 1994	Pink Floyd	—	Division Bell Tour	—	
December 11, 1994	The Rolling Stones	Spin Doctors	Voodoo Lounge Tour	$2,176,400	
June 22, 1997	Black Sabbath, Ozzy Osbourne, Marilyn Manson, Pantera	—	Ozzfest	—	
October 29, 1997	U2	Smash Mouth	PopMart Tour	$1,471,800	
November 25, 1997	The Rolling Stones	Third Eye Blind	Bridges to Babylon Tour	$2,674,383	
May 17, 1998	George Strait	Tim McGraw	George Strait Country Music Festival	—	
June 24, 2001	NSYNC	—	PopOdyssey	—	
July 27, 2003	Metallica	Limp Bizkit, Linkin Park, Deftones, Mudvayne	Summer Sanitarium Tour	—	

=== Other events ===
- 2002 and 2008 Victory Bowls, the NCCAA National Football Championships.
- Prep Bowl (Minnesota State High School League (MSHSL); state high school football championships) (1982–2013).
- MSHSL football semifinal games (1990–2013)
- MSHSL soccer championships and semifinals (1986–2013).
- High school and small college baseball games through the spring.
- Small college football games in November hosted by Augsburg College. Also other small college football events including the Northern Sun Intercollegiate Conference and the Upper Midwest Athletic Conference.
- AMA Motocross Championship (1994–2004, 2008, 2013)
- The Stadium Super Trucks off-road racing series scheduled an event in 2013.
- Other motorsport events.
- Large religious services and gatherings.
- The American Wrestling Association, promoted WrestleRock 86 on April 20, 1986, drawing 23,000. This was one of the AWA's last major shows before they went out of business several years later.
- Rollerdome inline skating around the stadium's concourses and Minnesota Distance Running Association running (exercise programs in the concourses).
- Conventions, such as Twins Fest, golf shows, home and garden expos, and car shows.
- Cultural celebrations, such as Hmong New Year gatherings and the Oromo Jilboo American Games.
- Youth in Music Band Championships
- The Promise Keepers, an all-men's evangelical Christian service.
- The annual Hmong American New Year celebration was held in December over the course of two days.
- Monster Jam.
- The 1991 World Special Olympics Summer Games Opening Ceremonies

=== Naming rights ===
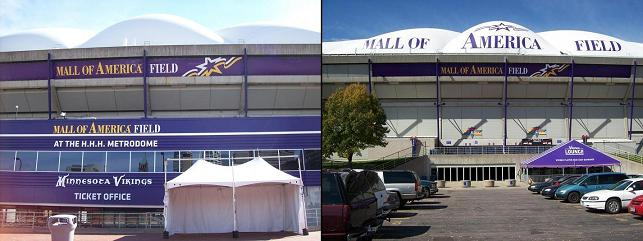
MoA signage at the Metrodome

In 2009, Mall of America purchased naming rights for the field at Metrodome. The contract stated that the field would be called "Mall of America Field at Hubert H. Humphrey Metrodome" for a three-year period, beginning October 5, 2009, and ending February 28, 2012. The name was still used for the 2012 and 2013 seasons.

Despite possible inference from the signage, the MoA name applied only to the field, not the stadium as a whole. The building remained Hubert H. Humphrey Metrodome. The connection between Mall of America and the Metrodome is also notable because Mall of America is built on the site of the former Metropolitan Stadium. The mall and the dome were located about 10 miles (16 km) apart from each other.

== Replacement facilities ==
With the passage of time, the Metrodome was thought to be an increasingly poor fit for its three major tenants, all of whom claimed the stadium was nearing the end of its useful life.

One major complaint was about the concourses, which were considered somewhat narrow by modern standards, making for cramped conditions whenever attendance was anywhere near capacity. During a 2010 Vikings game, Fox Sports' Alex Marvez wrote that the Metrodome's passageways were so cramped that it would be difficult for fans to evacuate in the event of an emergency. Two of the former tenants, the Gophers (football) and Twins, moved out, while the Vikings played their final years there until demolition. The Vikings' 2014 and 2015 seasons were played at the University of Minnesota's TCF Bank Stadium, and U.S. Bank Stadium, built on the Metrodome site, opened in time for the team's 2016 season.

The Twins, the Vikings, and the Gophers all proposed replacements for the Metrodome, and all three were accepted. The first of the three major tenants to move was the Gophers, who opened their new TCF Bank Stadium (now Huntington Bank Stadium) in September 2009. The next to depart were the Twins, whose new Target Field was completed in time for Opening Day 2010. On May 10, 2012, the Vikings were granted a new stadium by the Minnesota legislators that was built on the Metrodome site, which opened for the 2016 NFL season. Governor Mark Dayton signed the bill on May 14.

=== Minnesota Twins ===
The Twins moved to their new ballpark, Target Field, in 2010, after attaining their new stadium with an effort that began in the mid-1990s. Although indoor baseball had critics when Metrodome opened, it was positively regarded by players and fans. By 2001, with Metrodome's peculiarities revealed, and several newer purpose-built Major League Baseball stadiums constructed, an ESPN Page 2 reader poll ranked it as one of the worst Major League Baseball stadiums. Twins management claimed Metrodome generated too little revenue for the Twins to be competitive; specifically, they received no revenue from luxury suite leasing (as those were owned by the Vikings) and only a small percentage of concessions sales. This came to a head in 2001, when the Twins were nearly contracted along with the Montreal Expos, who were also generating insufficient revenue and had a stadium in poor condition. Also, the percentage of season-ticket-quality seats was said to be very low compared to other stadiums. From 2003 through 2009, the Twins had year-to-year leases, and could have moved to another city at any time. However, with no large American markets or new major-league-quality stadiums existing without a current team, it was accepted that the Twins could not profit from a move. The Twins sought a taxpayer subsidy of more than $200 million to assist in construction of the stadium. On January 9, 2005, the Twins went to court to argue that their Metrodome lease should be considered "dead" after the 2005 season. In February, the district court ruled that the Twins' lease was year-to-year and the team could vacate Metrodome at the end of the 2005 season.

In late April 2007, Hennepin County officially took over the future ballpark site (through a form of eminent domain called "quick-take") which had been an ongoing struggle between the county and the land owners. On October 15, 2007, the two sides reached a negotiated settlement of just under $29 million, ending the dispute. As a result, the county noted it would have to cut back on some improvements to the surrounding streetscapes, though it also revealed that the Pohlad family had committed another $15 million for infrastructure.

=== University of Minnesota Golden Gophers football ===
The Minnesota Golden Gophers football program began playing in Metrodome for the 1982 season. Attendance was expected to increase over the old Memorial Stadium attendance, especially for late fall games, due to the climate controlled comfort. Initially, average attendance had increased over previous seasons at Memorial Stadium. But, the venue was removed from the traditional on-campus football atmosphere if fans wanted to attend a Gophers football game. Students had to take a bus from the campus to the stadium. The distance from the main campus, along with poor performance by the Gopher football team, caused interest to wane.

The Gophers officially moved back onto campus, to TCF Bank Stadium, for the 2009 football season. The university believed an on-campus stadium would motivate its student base for increased ticket sales, and also would benefit from athletic revenues, not only for the football program, but the non-revenue sports as well. The new stadium reportedly cost less than half of a current-era NFL-style football stadium, and was built on what were former surface parking lots just a few blocks east of the former Memorial Stadium, with the naming rights purchased by TCF Financial Corporation. The University of Minnesota expected to raise more than half the cost of the stadium via private donations. The Gopher Stadium bill was passed by both houses on May 20, 2006, the day before the Twins Stadium bill passed. On May 24, 2006, Governor Pawlenty signed the Gopher bill on the university campus.

=== Minnesota Vikings ===
The Vikings initially preferred the option of locating a new stadium for their use at a Superfund site in Arden Hills, but costs of developing infrastructure made the site unworkable. A number of sites in Minneapolis were floated before the team and state settled on a location adjacent to and including the current Metrodome site.

On May 10, 2012, the Minnesota Legislature approved funding for a new Vikings stadium on that site. The project had a budget of $1.027 billion, of which the Vikings covered $529 million, the state covered $348 million, and the remaining $150 million was covered by a Minneapolis hospitality tax. The bill was signed by Governor Dayton on May 14. The Vikings played in the Metrodome until the end of the 2013 season. The Vikings' temporary home during construction was TCF Bank Stadium.

Preceded by Metropolitan Stadium	Home of the Minnesota Vikings; 1982–2013	Succeeded by Huntington Bank Stadium
Preceded by Metropolitan Stadium	Home of the Minnesota Twins; 1982–2009	Succeeded by Target Field
Preceded by Memorial Stadium	Home of the Minnesota Gophers; 1982–2008	Succeeded by Huntington Bank Stadium
Preceded by first arena	Home of the Minnesota Timberwolves; 1989–1990	Succeeded by Target Center
Preceded by Tampa Stadium	Host of Super Bowl XXVI; 1992	Succeeded by Rose Bowl
Preceded by Candlestick Park	Host of NFC Championship Game; 1999	Succeeded by Trans World Dome
Preceded by Ernest W. Spangler Stadium; Reeves Field	Host of the Victory Bowl; 2002; 2008	Succeeded by Reeves Field; Francis Field
Preceded by Candlestick Park	Host of the Major League Baseball All-Star Game; 1985	Succeeded by Astrodome
Preceded by Hoosier Dome; RCA Dome	NCAA Men's Division I Basketball Tournament; Finals Venue; 1992; 2001	Succeeded by Louisiana Superdome; Georgia Dome
