= Mike Gottsch =

American football player and coach

Playing career
- 1984–1985: Moorpark JC
- 1986–1987: Tabor
- Position: Quarterback

Coaching career (HC unless noted)
- 1992–1996: Henderson HS (NE)
- 1997–1999: Colby HS (KS)
- 2004–2006: Southmont HS (IN)
- 2007–2009: Tabor
- 2010–2014: Sapulpa HS (OK)

Head coaching record
- Overall: 3–27 (college)

Mike Gottsch is an American former football coach. He served as the head football coach at Tabor College in Hillsboro, Kansas from 2007 to 2009, conpluing a record of 3–27. The only win in his first season as head coach was a victory over Panhandle State University.

After the conclusion of the 2009 season at Tabor, Gottsch took a head coaching position at Sapulpa High School in Sapulpa, Oklahoma. He compiled a record of 22–28 at Sapulpa before he was fired midseason in October 2014. Gottsch is a native of Elkhorn, Nebraska.

== Personal life ==
Gottsch earned a bachelor's degree in physical education from Tabor and a master's degree in secondary education from Chadron State College, where he was an assistant coach.

== Head coaching record ==
=== College ===
Year	Team	Overall	Conference	Standing	Bowl/playoffs
Tabor Bluejays (Kansas Collegiate Athletic Conference) (2007–2009)
2007	Tabor	1–9	0–9	10th	
2008	Tabor	2–8	2–7	T–8th	
2009	Tabor	0–10	0–9	10th	
Tabor:		3–27	2–25		
Total:		3–27			
