= 2008 NAIA football rankings =

Legend
	Increase in ranking
	Decrease in ranking
	Not ranked previous week
*	NAIA National Champion
т	Tied with team above or below also with this symbol

One human poll made up the 2008 National Association of Intercollegiate Athletics (NAIA) football rankings, sometimes called the NAIA Coaches' Poll or the football ratings. Once the regular season was complete, the NAIA sponsored a 16-team playoff to determine the year's national champion. A final poll was then taken after completion of the 2008 NAIA Football National Championship.

== Poll release dates ==
The poll release dates were:

- April 21, 2008 (Spring)
- August 11, 2008 (Preseason)
- September 15, 2008
- September 22, 2008
- September 29, 2008
- October 6, 2008
- October 13, 2008
- October 20, 2008
- October 27, 2008
- November 3, 2008
- November 10, 2008
- November 16, 2008 (Final)
- January 12, 2009 (Postseason)

== Week by week poll ==
	Week 0-Spring Apr 21	Week 0-Preseason Aug 11	Week Poll 1 Sep 15	Week Poll 2 Sep 22	Week Poll 3 Sep 29	Week Poll 4 Oct 06	Week Poll 5 Oct 13	Week Poll 6 Oct 20	Week Poll 7 Oct 27	Week Poll 8 Nov 03	Week Poll 9 Nov 10	Week Final Nov 16	Week Postseason Jan 12	
1.	Carroll (MT)	Carroll (MT)	Carroll (MT)	Carroll (MT)	Carroll (MT)	Carroll (MT)	Carroll (MT)	Carroll (MT)	Carroll (MT)	Carroll (MT)	Carroll (MT)	Carroll (MT)	*Sioux Falls (SD)	1.
2.	Sioux Falls (SD)	Sioux Falls (SD)	Sioux Falls (SD)	Sioux Falls (SD)	Sioux Falls (SD)	Sioux Falls (SD)	Sioux Falls (SD)	Sioux Falls (SD)	Sioux Falls (SD)	Sioux Falls (SD)	Sioux Falls (SD)	Sioux Falls (SD)	Carroll (MT)	2.
3.	Missouri Valley	Missouri Valley	Missouri Valley	Missouri Valley	Missouri Valley	Missouri Valley	Missouri Valley	Saint Francis (IN)	Saint Francis (IN)	Saint Francis (IN)	Saint Francis (IN)	Saint Francis (IN)	Lindenwood (MO)	3.
4.	Saint Francis (IN)	Saint Francis (IN)	Saint Francis (IN)	Saint Francis (IN)	Saint Francis (IN)	Saint Francis (IN)	Saint Francis (IN)	Morningside (IA)	Morningside (IA)	Morningside (IA)	Morningside (IA)	MidAmerica Nazarene (KS)	Saint Francis (IN)	4.
5.	Bethel (TN)	Ohio Dominican	Ohio Dominican	Morningside (IA)	Morningside (IA)	Morningside (IA)	Morningside (IA)	MidAmerica Nazarene (KS)	MidAmerica Nazarene (KS)	MidAmerica Nazarene (KS)	MidAmerica Nazarene (KS)	Friends (KS)	Morningside (IA)	5.
6.	Ohio Dominican	Bethel (TN)	Morningside (IA)	MidAmerica Nazarene (KS)	MidAmerica Nazarene (KS)	MidAmerica Nazarene (KS)	MidAmerica Nazarene (KS)	Friends (KS)	Friends (KS)	Friends (KS)	Friends (KS)	Morningside (IA)	Cumberlands (KY)	6.
7.	Morningside (IA)	Morningside (IA)	MidAmerica Nazarene (KS)	Virginia-Wise	Friends (KS)	Friends (KS)	Friends (KS)	Lindenwood (MO)	Missouri Valley	Lindenwood (MO)	Lindenwood (MO)	Lindenwood (MO)	Langston (OK)	7.
8.	Saint Xavier (IL)	Saint Xavier (IL)	Virginia-Wise	Friends (KS)	Ohio Dominican	Lindenwood (MO)	Lindenwood (MO)	Northwestern Oklahoma State	Northwestern (IA)	Cumberlands (KY)	Cumberlands (KY)	Cumberlands (KY)	MidAmerica Nazarene (KS)	8.
9.	Lindenwood (MO)	Lindenwood (MO)	Friends (KS)	Ohio Dominican	Lindenwood (MO)	Northwestern Oklahoma State	Northwestern Oklahoma State	Missouri Valley	Lindenwood (MO)	Langston (OK)	Langston (OK)	Langston (OK)	Friends (KS)	9.
10.	St. Ambrose (IA)	St. Ambrose (IA)	St. Ambrose (IA)	St. Ambrose (IA)	Northwestern Oklahoma State	Northwestern (IA)	Northwestern (IA)	Northwestern (IA)	Virginia-Wise	Malone (OH)	Northwestern Oklahoma State	Northwestern Oklahoma State	Union (KY)	10.
11.	Friends (KS)	Friends (KS)	Lindenwood (MO)	Lindenwood (MO)	Northwestern (IA)	Union (KY)	Virginia-Wise	Virginia-Wise	Cumberlands (KY)	Northwestern Oklahoma State	Lambuth (TN)	Union (KY)	Shorter (GA)	11.
12.	Jamestown (ND)	MidAmerica Nazarene (KS)	Northwestern Oklahoma State	Northwestern Oklahoma State	Union (KY)	Virginia-Wise	Montana State-Northern	Cumberlands (KY)	Saint Xavier (IL)	Northwestern (IA)	Missouri Valley	Shorter (GA)	Baker (KS)	12.
13.	Virginia-Wise	Northwestern (IA)	Bethel (KS)	(T) Bethel (KS)	Virginia-Wise	Montana State-Northern	Black Hills State (SD)	Saint Xavier (IL)	Langston (OK)	Lambuth (TN)	Malone (OH)	Baker (KS)	Dickinson State (SD)	13.
14.	MidAmerica Nazarene (KS)	Virginia-Wise	Northwestern (IA)	(T) Northwestern (IA)	Montana State-Northern	Black Hills State (SD)	Cumberlands (KY)	Union (KY)	Bethel (KS)	Missouri Valley	Ottawa (KS)	Dickinson State (SD)	St. Ambrose (IA)	14.
15.	Northwestern (IA)	Northwestern Oklahoma State	Montana State-Northern	Jamestown (ND)	Black Hills State (SD)	Ohio Dominican	St. Ambrose (IA)	Bethel (KS)	Northwestern Oklahoma State	Baker (KS)	Union (KY)	St. Ambrose (IA)	Lambuth (TN)	15.
16.	Cumberlands (KY)	Georgetown (KY)	Jamestown (ND)	Union (KY)	St. Ambrose (IA)	Cumberlands (KY)	Saint Xavier (IL)	Langston (OK)	Malone (OH)	Virginia-Wise	Baker (KS)	(T) Lambuth (TN)	Ohio Dominican	16.
17.	Northwestern Oklahoma State	Bethel (KS)	Georgetown (KY)	Montana State-Northern	Cumberlands (KY)	St. Ambrose (IA)	Union (KY)	Black Hills State (SD)	Lambuth (TN)	Ottawa (KS)	Dickinson State (SD)	(T) Ohio Dominican	Missouri Valley	17.
18.	Bethel (KS)	Black Hills State (SD)	(T) Black Hills State (SD)	Georgetown (KY)	St. Francis (IL)	Bethel (KS)	Bethel (KS)	Malone (OH)	Jamestown (ND)	Union (KY)	Saint Xavier (IL)	Missouri Valley	Northwestern (IA)	18.
19.	Black Hills State (SD)	(T) Jamestown (ND)	(T) Union (KY)	Black Hills State (SD)	Midland Lutheran (NB)	Saint Xavier (IL)	Langston (OK)	Montana State-Northern	Ottawa (KS)	Saint Xavier (IL)	Shorter (GA)	Northwestern (IA)	Virginia-Wise	19.
20.	Azusa Pacific (CA)	(T) Minot State (ND)	Valley City State (ND)	Cumberlands (KY)	Bethel (KS)	Shorter (GA)	St. Francis (IL)	Jamestown (ND)	Dickinson State (SD)	Dickinson State (SD)	St. Ambrose (IA)	Ottawa (KS)	Ottawa (KS)	20.
21.	Montana Tech	Montana Tech	Cumberlands (KY)	St. Francis (IL)	Saint Xavier (IL)	Langston (OK)	Jamestown (ND)	Lambuth (TN)	Union (KY)	Shorter (GA)	Northwestern (IA)	Virginia-Wise	Montana State-Northern	21.
22.	Sterling (KS)	Cumberlands (KY)	St. Francis (IL)	Midland Lutheran (NB)	Langston (OK)	St. Francis (IL)	Malone (OH)	Ottawa (KS)	Shorter (GA)	St. Ambrose (IA)	Virginia-Wise	Malone (OH)	Saint Xavier (IL)	22.
23.	Georgetown (KY)	Azusa Pacific (CA)	Southern Nazarene (OK)	Langston (OK)	Shorter (GA)	Jamestown (ND)	Ohio Dominican	St. Ambrose (IA)	St. Ambrose (IA)	Bethel (KS)	Ohio Dominican	Montana State-Northern	Dakota Wesleyan (SD)	23.
24.	Malone (OH)	Malone (OH)	Bethel (TN)	Valley City State (ND)	Jamestown (ND)	(T) Midland Lutheran (NB)	Ottawa (KS)	Ohio Dominican	Baker (KS)	Ohio Dominican	Montana State-Northern	Saint Xavier (IL)	Malone (OH)	24.
25.	Nebraska Wesleyan	McKendree (IL)	Midland Lutheran (NB)	Saint Xavier (IL)	Sterling (KS)	(T) Malone (OH)	Lambuth (TN)	Shorter (GA)	Ohio Dominican	Minot State (ND)	Dakota Wesleyan (SD)	Dakota Wesleyan (SD)	Jamestown (ND)	25.
	Week 0-Spring Apr 21	Week 0-Preseason Aug 11	Week Poll 1 Sep 15	Week Poll 2 Sep 22	Week Poll 3 Sep 29	Week Poll 4 Oct 06	Week Poll 5 Oct 13	Week Poll 6 Oct 20	Week Poll 7 Oct 27	Week Poll 8 Nov 03	Week Poll 9 Nov 10	Week Final Nov 16	Week Postseason Jan 12	
		Dropped: Nebraska Wesleyan; Sterling (KS)	Dropped: Azusa Pacific (CA); Malone (OH); McKendree (IL); Minot State (ND); Montana Tech; Saint Xavier (IL)	Dropped: Bethel (TN); Southern Nazarene (OK)	Dropped: Georgetown (KY); Valley City State (ND)	Dropped: Sterling (KS)	Dropped: Midland Lutheran (NB); Shorter (GA)	Dropped: St. Francis (IL)	Dropped: Black Hills State (SD); Montana State-Northern	Dropped: Jamestown (ND)	Dropped: Bethel (KS); Minot State (ND)	None	Dropped: Northwestern Oklahoma State	

== Leading vote-getters ==
Since the inception of the Coaches' Poll in 1999, the #1 ranking in the various weekly polls has been held by only a select group of teams. Through the postseason poll of the 2008 season, the teams and the number of times they have held the #1 weekly ranking are shown below. The number of times a team has been ranked #1 in the postseason poll (the national champion) is shown in parentheses.

In 1999, the results of a postseason poll, if one was conducted, are not known. Therefore, an additional poll has been presumed, and the #1 postseason ranking has been credited to the postseason tournament champion, the Northwestern Oklahoma State Rangers.

Team	Total #1 Rankings
Carroll (MT)	53 (5)
Sioux Falls (SD)	30 (2)
Georgetown (KY)	23 (2)
Northwestern Oklahoma State	12 (1)
Azusa Pacific (CA)	3
Saint Francis (IN)	3
