= 2007 Victory Bowl =

Malone Pioneers	Geneva Golden Tornadoes
(7–4)	(8–2)
45	17
Head coach: Mike Gardner	Head coach: Geno DeMarco
	1	2	3	4	Total
Malone	7	31	0	7	45
Geneva	7	3	7	0	17
- Date: November 17, 2007
- Season: 2007
- Stadium: Reeves Field
- Location: Beaver Falls, Pennsylvania
- MVP: Offensive: Dan Hromada (Malone); Defensive: Bernard Payton (Malone)
- Attendance: 1,265

The 2007 Victory Bowl was a college football bowl game. It was a part of the 2007 football season and was played at Reeves Field in Beaver Falls, Pennsylvania. The game placed the Malone Pioneers against the Geneva College Golden Tornadoes.

Malone won the game by a score of 45 to 17. A strong showing in the second quarter of 31 points by the Pioneers helped to secure the win and was assisted by four turnovers. The game was the second bowl appearance for both the Pioneers and Malone coach Mike Gardner, as well as the first bowl game victory for both.

Malone produced 521 yards of total offense while holding Geneva to 293. Malone managed six touchdowns in the game (three rushing and three passing) and scored a total of 31 points in the second quarter alone. Malone's defense brought in two interceptions and recovered three fumbles.

== Scoring Summary ==
Scoring summary

Quarter	Time	Drive			Team	Scoring information	Score	
Quarter	Time	Plays	Yards	TOP	Team	Scoring information	Malone Pioneers	Geneva Golden Tornadoes
1	13:01	10	49	2:01	Geneva Golden Tornadoes	Ryan Forbes 13-yard touchdown reception from Bobby Bondi, Nick DiPietro kick Good	0	7
1	3:25	1	22	0:08	Malone Pioneers	Bernard Payton 22-yard touchdown run, Mike Skvor kick Good	7	7
2	13:44	8	33	2:27	Geneva Golden Tornadoes	26-yard field goal by Nick DiPietro	7	10
2	11:49	5	40	1:50	Malone Pioneers	45-yard field goal by Mike Skvor	10	10
2	9:07	4	32	1:08	Malone Pioneers	Bernard Payton 20-yard touchdown run, Mike Skvor kick Good	17	10
2	7:59	3	29	0:57	Malone Pioneers	Derek Deardorff 39-yard touchdown reception from Billy Bob Orsagh, Mike Skvor kick Good	24	10
2	4:47	6	35	2:18	Malone Pioneers	Bernard Payton 3-yard touchdown run, Mike Skvor kick Good	31	10
2	00:29	11	81	3:08	Malone Pioneers	Mike Clapham 15-yard touchdown reception from Billy Bob Orsagh, Mike Skvor kick Good	38	10
3	4:17	7	80	2:34	Geneva Golden Tornadoes	Parker Nuetzel 7-yard touchdown reception from Bobby Bondi, Nick DiPietro kick Good	38	17
4	11:10	6	83	2:42	Malone Pioneers	Derek Deardorff 73-yard touchdown reception from Billy Bob Orsagh, Mike Skvor kick Good	45	17
"TOP" = time of possession. For other American football terms, see Glossary of American football.							Malone Pioneers	Geneva Golden Tornadoes
