= 2008 NAIA football national championship =

2008 NAIA Football Championship
	1st	2nd	3rd	4th	Total
Sioux Falls (SD)	3	7	0	13	23
Carroll (MT)	0	0	0	7	7
- Date: December 20, 2008
- Stadium: Barron Stadium
- City: Rome, Georgia
- MOP (Offense): Lorenzo Brown Jr., Sioux Falls
- MOP (Defense): Kyle Cummings, Sioux Falls
- Officials: Tim Bryan; Pat Callahan; Mitch Saling; Paul Schardein; Steve Gunter; Pete Quesada; Terry Allgeier
- Attendance: 6,500

The 2008 NAIA football championship series concluded on December 20, 2008 with the championship game played at Barron Stadium in Rome, Georgia. The championship was won by the Sioux Falls Cougars over the Carroll Fighting Saints by a score of 23–7.

== Scoring Summary ==
Scoring summary

Quarter	Time	Drive			Team	Scoring information	Score	
Quarter	Time	Plays	Yards	TOP	Team	Scoring information	Sioux Falls Cougars	Carroll Fighting Saints
1	3:16	10	50	6:03	Sioux Falls Cougars	24-yard field goal by Matt Lindgren	3	0
2	13:12	-	-	-	Sioux Falls Cougars	10 Yard blocked Punt return touchdown by Joe Moen	10	0
4	14:12	6	65	7:04	Sioux Falls Cougars	Jon Ryan 54-yard touchdown reception from Lorenzo Brown Jr., Matt Lindgren kick Good	17	0
4	6:15	4	64	0:49	Carroll Fighting Saints	Travis Browne 39-yard touchdown reception from Matt Ritter, Connor Janhunen kick Good	17	7
4	2:44	-	-	-	Sioux Falls Cougars	Fumble recovery returned 39 yards for touchdown by Drew DeGroot, Matt Lindgren kick Failed	23	7
"TOP" = time of possession. For other American football terms, see Glossary of American football.							Sioux Falls Cougars	Carroll Fighting Saints

== Tournament bracket ==
1st Round; November 22
1	Carroll (MT) (11–0)	35
14	Dickinson State (7–3)	18
5	Friends (KS) (10–0)	7
10	Northwestern Oklahoma State (8–2)	42
6	Morningside (IA) (9–1)	65
13	Baker (KS) (8–3)	27
7	Lindenwood (MO) (9–1)	65
16	Lambuth (TN) (8–3)	48
2	Sioux Falls (SD) (10–0)	28
15	Saint Ambrose (IA) (8–3)	0
4	MidAmerica Nazarene (10–0)	14
9	Langston (OK) (9–2)	20
3	Saint Francis (IN) (10–0)	58
11	Union (KY) (9–2)	3
8	Cumberlands (KY) (9–1)	31
12	Shorter (GA) (9–2)	7

Quarterfinals; November 29
1	Carroll (MT)
10	Northwestern Oklahoma State (vacated)**
6	Morningside (IA)	31
7	Lindenwood (MO)	34
2	Sioux Falls (SD)	50
9	Langston (OK)	13
3	Saint Francis (IN)	31
8	Cumberlands (KY)	20

Semifinals; December 6
1	Carroll (MT)	38
7	Lindenwood (MO)	37
2	Sioux Falls (SD)	24
3	Saint Francis (IN)	6

Championship; December 20
1	Carroll (MT)	7
2	Sioux Falls (SD)	23

- * denotes OT.
- ** in their opening round game, Northwestern Oklahoma State used ineligible players. The results of that game were left on the record books, but the Rangers were ruled ineligible for further participation in the championship series. Their opponent in the second round, Carroll (MT), was automatically advanced to the next round.
