= Frances M. Gray =

American academic

Frances M. Gray (1910 – December 15, 2001) was an American biblical scholar and Christian art expert, known for her contributions to education for women in the Middle East. She was a president of Beirut College for Women and the first president of Damavand College from 1968 to 1975. She retired in the Spring of 1975.

== Early life and career ==
Gray was born in Little Rock, Arkansas, but grew up in Memphis, Tennessee. She obtained an M.A. from the University of Chicago, an M.S. from the New York School of Social Work at Columbia University, and a Master of Religious Education from the Biblical Seminary of New York. She earned an honorary doctorate from Whitworth College in Spokane, Washington.

After college, Gray did social work in Arkansas and Chicago. During World War II she worked for the Red Cross in Europe. After the war, she worked for the Presbyterian Church in San Francisco and New York. She taught for three years at Beirut College for Women and then was named college president where she remained until going to Damavand College six years later.

She came to Iran in 1965 as director of Iran Bethel School, Educational Project and was preceded by Jane Doolittle. She transformed Damavand College into a four-year liberal arts college for women, saw the first freshman class begin in 1968 and the first graduation in 1972. D. Ray Heisey was preceded by her as the third president of Damavand College from 1975 to 1978. Meanwhile Mary C. Thompson was the academic dean of the college from 1969 to 1978. Gray's efforts put Damavand in the forefront of higher education for women in the Middle East.

== Awards ==
Gray received the Gold Medal of the Cedars from Lebanon's president. In 1973 she was awarded The Order of the Taj by the Shahanshah Mohammad Reza Shah for her service to Damavand College and Iran.

== Death ==
Gray died on December 15, 2001, of cancer just before her 92nd birthday.

== Sources ==
- Damvand College Handbook in Farsi, 1973–1974, with English Introduction by Frances M. Gray, p. 2
- Heights 1974–75, Damavand College, Tehran, Iran, p. 3
- Heights 1976–77, Damavand College, p. 7
- St. John, Kelly (December 22, 2001). "Frances M. Gray -- biblical scholar". SFGate.
