= Michael H. Prosser =

American academic (1936–2026)

- Born: March 29, 1936
- Died: January 29, 2026 (aged 89)
- Scientific career
- Fields: Intercultural Communication
- Website: http://www.michaelprosser.com

Michael H. Prosser (March 29, 1936 – January 29, 2026), professor emeritus of the University of Virginia (1972–2001), was a Fulbright Professor at the University of Swaziland (1990–91), at which he initiated the communication major and experienced a military invasion on November 14, 1990, where 2–4 students were killed and more than 300–400 were injured. President of SIETAR International (1984–86), he later chaired six Rochester Intercultural Conferences (1995–2001), and was series editor for 17 books in Civic Discourse for the Third Millennium for Ablex, Praeger and Greenwood Publishing Group (1998–2004). A founder of the academic field of intercultural communication, he was editor, coeditor, author or coauthor of 20 books plus one special volume for the International Journal of Intercultural Relations (2012: November).

== Work ==
Prosser's books range from classical and medieval rhetoric, international public discourse, the United Nations, intercultural, international, and global media to China, cross-cultural values, and social media. Five books have been published by Chinese presses. Prosser was awarded honors in 2009 and 2011 by the Chinese Association for Intercultural Communication and in 2013 by the International Academy for Intercultural Research. He was a keynoter at 15 conferences in China, India, Japan, and Russia. His book, The Cultural Dialogue (1978) was published in Japanese (1982) and Chinese (2013). The first in a trilogy on social media was Social Media in Asia (2014). Later he was coediting Social Media in the Middle East which was to be published in 2016. The third volume Social Media in Africa was planned for publication in 2018.

Prosser was a Distinguished Visiting professor in the School of Communication at Kent State University (1978) during the absence of D. Ray Heisey while he was president at Damavand College, Tehran, Iran and later as the William A. Kern Professor at the Rochester Institute of Technology (1994–2001). He later taught at Canadian and American universities and as Distinguished Professor at four Chinese universities. He was the academic advisor for lifelong learners and the Asian/intercultural specialist on the University of Virginia/Institute for Shipboard Learning on the autumn 2011 Semester at Sea around the world study voyage. He visited 69 countries including 11 in Asia. His later Chinese students began to call him a ChiAmerican because of his ten years of teaching 2550 students in China.

== Intercultural communication career ==
Prosser got his PhD from the University of Illinois in 1964 writing, his doctoral dissertation on the addresses of Ambassador Adlai E. Stevenson in the United Nations General Assembly, which later led to his editing of the international speeches of Stevenson and a two volume collection of addresses by heads of state and government in the General Assembly. He was a founder of the academic field of intercultural communicationin North America, and a participant in the field in China from 2001 to 2014. He was listed in the Marquis Who's Who in American Education, Who's Who in America, Who's Who in Asia, and Who's Who in the World. He served as President of the International Society of Intecultural Education Training, and Research (1984–86), Founding President of the Rochester New York Fulbright Association (1995–1998), President of the United Nations Association of Rochester New York (1998–99), a member of the editorial board of the Journal of Middle Eastern and Islamic Studies (in Asia) (2007–2012), Chair of the International Advisory Board and Senior Coeditor for the Intercultural Research Series at the Intercultural Institute of Shanghai International Studies University (from 2006), Associate Editor of the Journal of Asian Religions (2014–present), and he was a Fellow in the International Academy for Intercultural Research. Besides receiving honors from Ball State University and the International Communication Association in 1978, SIETAR International in 1986 and 1990, the China Association for Intercultural Communication in 2009 and 2011, and the International Academy for Intercultural Research (2013), he was awarded the 2015 Lifetime Achievement Award by the academy which will be given to him at the biennial conference in Bergen, Norway, June 28 – July 2, 2015.

In November 2014, he gave a keynote address: "Social Media and Cybernetics in Asia: Implications for Regional Security" at the National University of Defense Technology International Security Conference in Changsha, China, plus six lectures at the university, and three lectures at Central South University in Changsha during early December 2014. As coeditor with Cui Litang of Tan Kha Kee College of Xiamen University of his social media trilogy, the first, Social Media in Asia (2014), and presently of Social Media in the Middle East to be published in 2016 with Adil Nurmakov of KIMEP in Kazakhstan and Ehsan Shahghasemi of the University of Tehran, the third planned volume, Social Media in Africa, to be coedited with Debhasis (Deb) of the University of North Carolina at Chapel Hill, and to be published in 2018. All three books are being published by Dignity Press.

== Death ==
Prosser on died on January 29, 2026, at the age of 89.

== Selected publications ==
- Benson, T.W. & Prosser, M. H. (Eds.) (1969, 1972, 1985, 1989). Readings in Classical Rhetoric. Boston, MA: Allyn and Bacon. Bloomington, IN: Indiana University Press: Davis, CA: Hermagoras Press.
- Cui, L.T. & Prosser, M.H. (Eds.) (2014). Social Media in Asia, Lake Oswego, OR: Dignity Press. ISBN 978-1-937570-36-1
- Donahue, R. T. & Prosser, M.H. (1997). Diplomatic Discourse: International Conflict at the United Nations, New York, NY: William Morrow. ISBN 978-1-56750-291-6 (different edition)
- Kulich, S. J. & Prosser, M. H. (Eds.) (2007). Intercultural Perspectives on Chinese Communication, Shanghai, China: Shanghai Foreign Language Education Press
- Kulich, S.J., Prosser, M. H., & Weng, L.P. (Eds.) (2012). Value Frameworks at the Theoretical Crossroads of Culture, Vol. 4, Shanghai, China: Shanghai Foreign Language Education Press. ISBN 978-7-5446-2881-5
- Kulich, S. J., Weng, L. P., & Prosser, M.H. Value Dimensions and Their Contextual Dynamics across Cultures, Vol. 5, Shanghai, China: Shanghai Foreign Language Education Press.
- Li, M. & Prosser, M.H. (2012). Communicating Interculturally, Beijing, China: Higher Education Press.
- Li, M. & Prosser, M.H. (2014). Chinese Communicating Interculturally, Lake Oswego, OR: Dignity Press. ISBN 978-1-937570-28-6.
- Miller, J.M, Prosser, M.H., & Benson, T.W., (Eds.) (1973). Readings in Medieval Rhetoric. Bloomington, IN: Indiana University Press.
- Prosser, M. H. (Ed) (1969), An Ethic for Survival: Adlai Stevenson Speaks on International Issues, 1936–1965, New York, NY: William Morrow, Co. LCCN 69-11245
- Prosser, M.H. (Ed.) (1970), Sow the Wind, Reap the Whirlwind: Heads of State Address the United Nations, two volumes, deluxe, boxed set, and numbered for the twenty-fifth anniversary of the United Nations, New York, NY: William Morrow, Co. LCCN 73-118271
- Prosser, M. H. (Ed.) (1973), Intercommunication among Nations and Peoples, New York, NY: Harper and Row. ISBN 0-06-045287-0 Press. ISBN 0-253-34878-1
- Prosser, M. H. (1978), The Cultural Dialogue: An introduction to Intercultural Communication, Boston, MA: Houghton Mifflin Co., (1985, 1985, 1989). Washington, D.C.: SIETAR International; translated into Japanese by Roiche Okabe (1982). Tokyo, Japan: Tokai University Press. (2013). He Daokuan, Translated into Chinese. Beijing, China: Peking University Press.
- Prosser, M.H. & Sitaram, K.S. (Eds.)(1999), Civic Discourse: Intercultural, International, and Global Media, Stamford, CT: Ablex Publishing Co. ISBN 978-1-56750-417-0
- Prosser, M.H. (Ed.) (1978), Intercultural Communication Course: 1977 Proceedings, Washington, DC. International Communication Agency. (No ISBN assigned)
- Prosser, M.H. (forthcoming), Journey to the East: Asia in Focus, Lake Oswego, OR: Dignity Press. (ISBN not yet assigned)
- Prosser, M. H., Nurmakov, A., & Shahghasemi, E. (Eds.) (forthcoming). Social Media in the Middle East. Lake Oswego, OR: Dignity Press. (ISBN not yet assigned)
- Prosser, M.H., Sharifzadeh, M., & Zhang, S. Y. (2013). Finding Cross-cultural Common Ground, Lake Oswego, OR: Dignity Press. ISBN 978-1-937570-25-5
- Sitaram, K.S. & Prosser, M.H. (Eds.) (1998). Civic Discourse: Multiculturalism, Cultural Diversity, and Global Communication, Stamford, CT: Ablex Publishing Co. ISBN 978-1-56750-410-1
- Zhou, S.L., Prosser, M.H., & Lu, J. (Coeds.). (2003). Sino-American Compositions on Shared Topics. Zheng Zhou, Chin: Henan People's Press.
