= Fidelia Fisk =

American missionary (1816–1864)

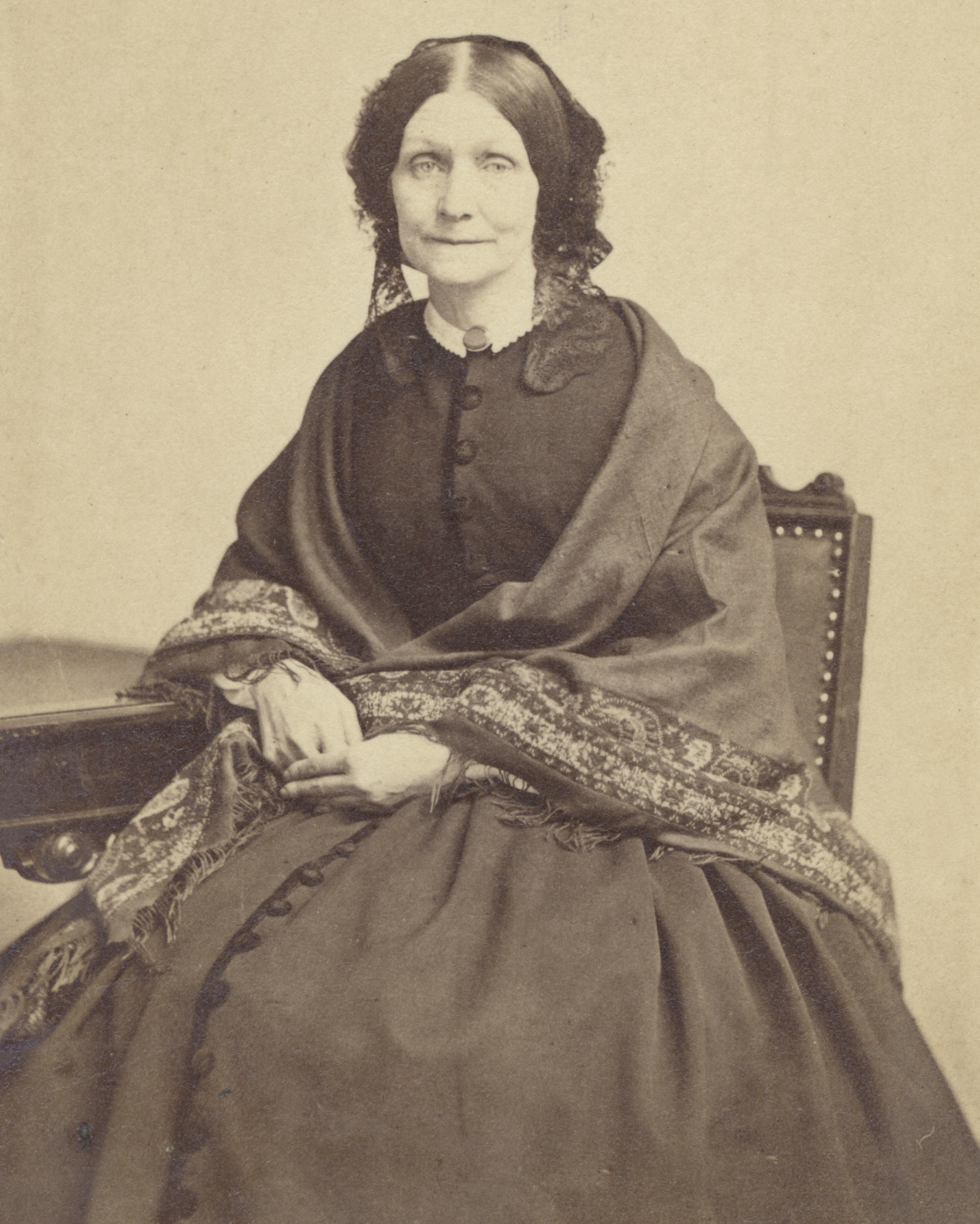
- Fidelia Fisk (1842)
- Born: 1 May 1816; Shelburne, Massachusetts, U.S.
- Died: 9 August 1864 (aged 48)
- Other name: Fidelia Fiske
- Education: Mount Holyoke Seminary (now Mount Holyoke College)
- Occupations: missionary, teacher, writer, school founder

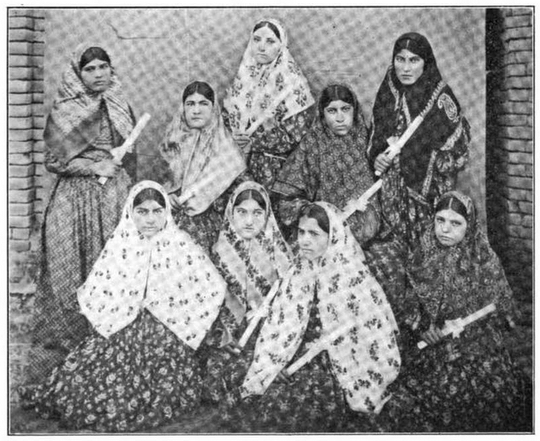
Students at Fiske Seminary in Urmia, from a 1909 publication.

Fidelia Fisk (also known as Fidelia Fiske; 1 May 1816 – 9 August 1864) was an American Congregationalist missionary and teacher. She founded the Fiske Seminary boarding school in Urmia in West Azerbaijan Province, Qajar Iran.

== Early life ==
Fidelia Fisk was born 1 May 1816 in Shelburne, Massachusetts. Her uncle Pliny Fisk was also a noted missionary. She graduated from Mount Holyoke Seminary in 1839, and subsequently taught there. She had worked very closely with Mary Lyon, whom she considered as close as family.

== In Qajar Iran ==
In 1843, she resigned her post at Mount Holyoke Seminary and went to Qajar Iran as a missionary among the Christian Assyrians (who were once called "Nestorians" by Americans during the late 18th century, but is now an outdated term). Fisk had been recruited for the job by missionary Justin Perkins to continue the work of Judith Grant, the wife of missionary Asahel Grant. The Assyrian Church of the East of Urmia and Bishop Mar Yohannan, wanted literacy and education for women and Fisk had a leadership role in this goal. She had begun her work as a day schoolteacher for girls within Urmia Seminary, and was the first principal there.

=== Fiske Seminary ===
She worked towards modeled her new boarding school after Mount Holyoke Seminary. She opened the Fiske Seminary in 1843. Fisk had labored in Iran for fifteen years, much of the time as teacher in a female seminary, she also served as a nurse and extended social support for some of her students. By her last year in Urmia 1858, she had some 40 students. It was upon her leaving the school was named "Fiske Seminary".

== Late life and death ==
In 1858, she returned to the United States with broken health, with the idea she would eventually return when she was healthy to do so. After her departure from Urmia, Nancy Jane Dean replaced her at the Fiske Seminary.

Fisk was never able to return to Iran. She died on 9 August 1864. At the time of her death, she was engaged in writing Recollections of Mary Lyon (Boston, 1866).

== Publications ==
- Perkins, Justin; Fiske, Fidelia (1857). Nestorian Biography: Being Sketches of Pious Nestorians who Have Died at Oroomiah, Persia. American Board of Commissioners for Foreign Missions. Massachusetts Sabbath School Society.
- Fisk, Fidelia (1862). Memorial: Twenty-fifth Anniversary of the Mt. Holyoke Female Seminary.
- Laurie, Thomas; Fisk, Fidelia (1863). Woman and Her Saviour in Persia.
- Fiske, Fidelia (1866). Recollections of Mary Lyon.
