= Annie Stocking Boyce =

American missionary teacher (1880-1973)

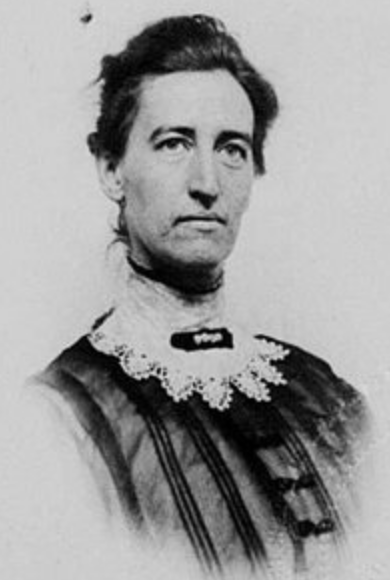
- Annie Stocking Boyce, from her 1915 passport application.
- Born: Annie Woodman Stocking; January 7, 1880; Wiscasset, Maine, U.S.
- Died: January 26, 1973 (aged 93); Pasadena, California, U.S.
- Known for: Educator; Presbyterian missionary in Tehran
- Spouse: Arthur Clifton Boyce (m. 1914-1959; his death)

Annie Stocking Boyce (January 7, 1880 – January 26, 1973) was an American Presbyterian missionary teacher active in Tehran, from 1906 until 1949. She also launched and edited a Persian-language women's journal, Alam-e-Nesvan (World of Women).

== Early life ==
Annie Woodman Stocking was born in Wiscasset, Maine, and raised in Williamstown, Massachusetts, the daughter of William Redfield Stocking and Isabella Coffin Baker Stocking. Her parents and paternal grandparents were missionaries in Persia and Turkey; her father, born in Persia, was also a Union Army veteran of the American Civil War. She earned a bachelor's degree at Wellesley College in 1902.

== Career ==
Boyce was a teaching missionary in Iran from 1906 until 1949, appointed by the Presbyterian Board of Foreign Missions. She spoke Persian, and worked at the Iran Bethel School, a girls' school in Tehran; Jane Doolittle was among Boyce's colleagues there. From 1918, she was president of the school's alumnae association. She was also founding editor of Alam-e-Nesvan (World of Women), a Persian-language women's magazine that carried practical advice, alumnae news, and translations from American literature. She was also active in Anjoman-e ḥorrīyat-e zanān (Association for the Freedom of Women), a feminist organization of the late Qajar period.

She also worked at Alborz College in Tehran, teaching courses and supervising housing; her husband, Arthur Clifton Boyce, was a professor and dean at Alborz, and was the college's acting president in 1929.

Boyce wrote about her work in letters to her family and for American publications, including "Moslem Women in the Capital of Persia" (1930), and in a book, Kings, Queens and Veiled Ladies (1933). She spoke about Iran to church congregations and women's groups during her furloughs in the United States.

== Personal life ==
Annie Stocking married fellow American missionary educator Arthur Clifton Boyce in 1914. That year they attended an annual missions meeting in Chicago together. In 1915, returning to Tehran during World War I, they traveled by sea and rail from New York through Norway, Finland and Russia. She was widowed in 1959, and she died in 1973, aged 93, in Pasadena, California. Her gravesite is in Illinois.
