= Ordell Walker =

American football coach

Current position
- Title: Head coach
- Team: Urbana HS (IL)
- Conference: Big Twelve (IHSA)

Biographical details
- Education: Trinity International

Coaching career (HC unless noted)
- 1999–2000: Trinity International (assistant)
- 2001–2002: North Chicago HS (IL)
- 2003–2009: Greenville (IL) (assistant)
- 2010–2012: Greenville (IL)
- 2013–2016: Bluefield
- 2017–present: Urbana HS (IL)

Head coaching record
- Overall: 27–48 (college)
- Bowls: 1–1

Accomplishments and honors

Championships
- 2 UMAC (2010, 2012)

Ordell Walker is an American football coach. He currently is the head football coach at Urbana High School in Urbana, Illinois, a position he has held since 2017. Walker served as the head football coach at Greenville University in Greenville, Illinois from 2010 to 2012 and Bluefield College in Bluefield, Virginia from 2013 to 2016.

== Head coaching record ==
=== College ===
Year	Team	Overall	Conference	Standing	Bowl/playoffs
Greenville Panthers (Upper Midwest Athletic Conference) (2010–2012)
2010	Greenville	7–3	6–0	1st	
2011	Greenville	7–4	7–2	T–2nd	L Victory Bowl
2012	Greenville	8–2	7–1	T–1st	W Victory Bowl
Greenville:		22–9	20–3		
Bluefield Rams (Mid-South Conference) (2013–2016)
2013	Bluefield	0–11	0–6	7th (East)	
2014	Bluefield	3–8	1–5	T–6th (East)	
2015	Bluefield	1–10	0–5	6th (East)	
2016	Bluefield	1–10	1–5	6th (East)	
Bluefield:		5–39	2–21		
Total:		27–48			
National championship Conference title Conference division title or championship game berth
