= Mannoia =

Mannoia is an Italian surname from Sicily. Notable people with the surname include:

- Fiorella Mannoia (born 1954), Italian singer-songwriter
- Francesco Marino Mannoia (born 1951), Italian former mobster and informant
- Kevin W. Mannoia (born 1955), American theologian
- Vincent James Mannoia Jr. (born 1949), American academic administrator
