= Justin Perkins =

American missionary (1805–1869)

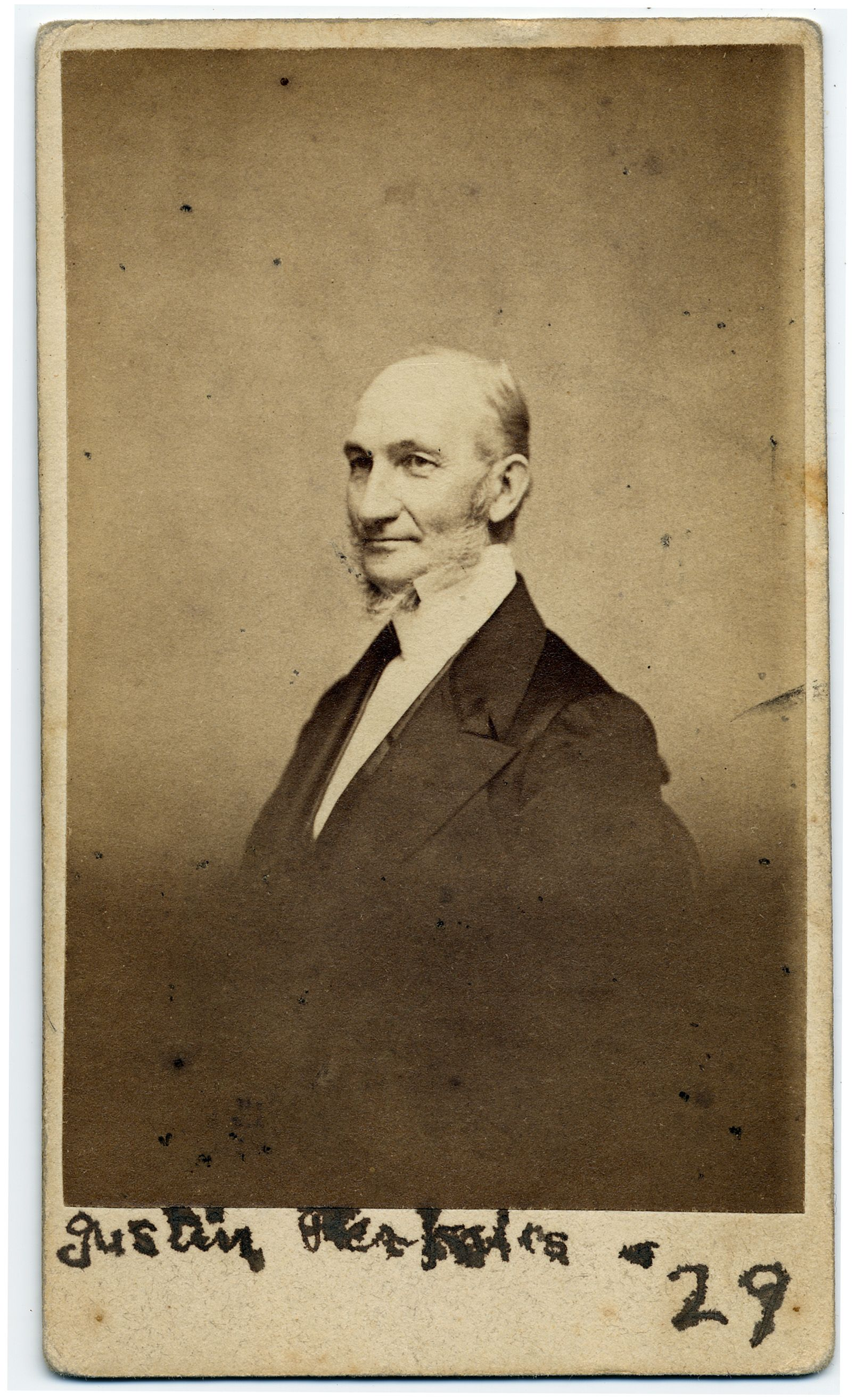
- Born: March 5, 1805; West Springfield (now Holyoke), Massachusetts, U.S.
- Died: December 31, 1869 (aged 64); Chicopee, Massachusetts, U.S.
- Education: Amherst College, Andover Theological Seminary
- Occupations: Presbyterian missionary, linguist, theologist, publisher, memoirist, painter
- Known for: the first missionary and visitor from the United States to Iran
- Spouse: Charlotte Bass
- Children: 7

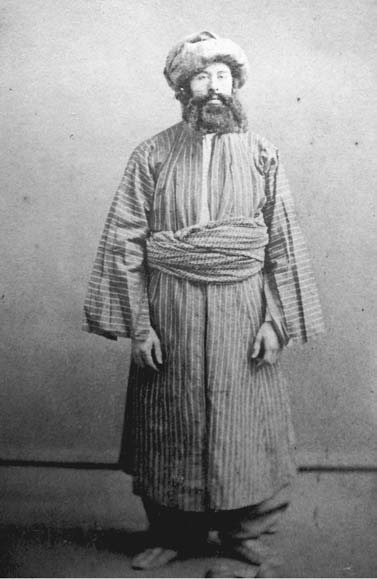
Mar Yohannan in the U.S., 1842

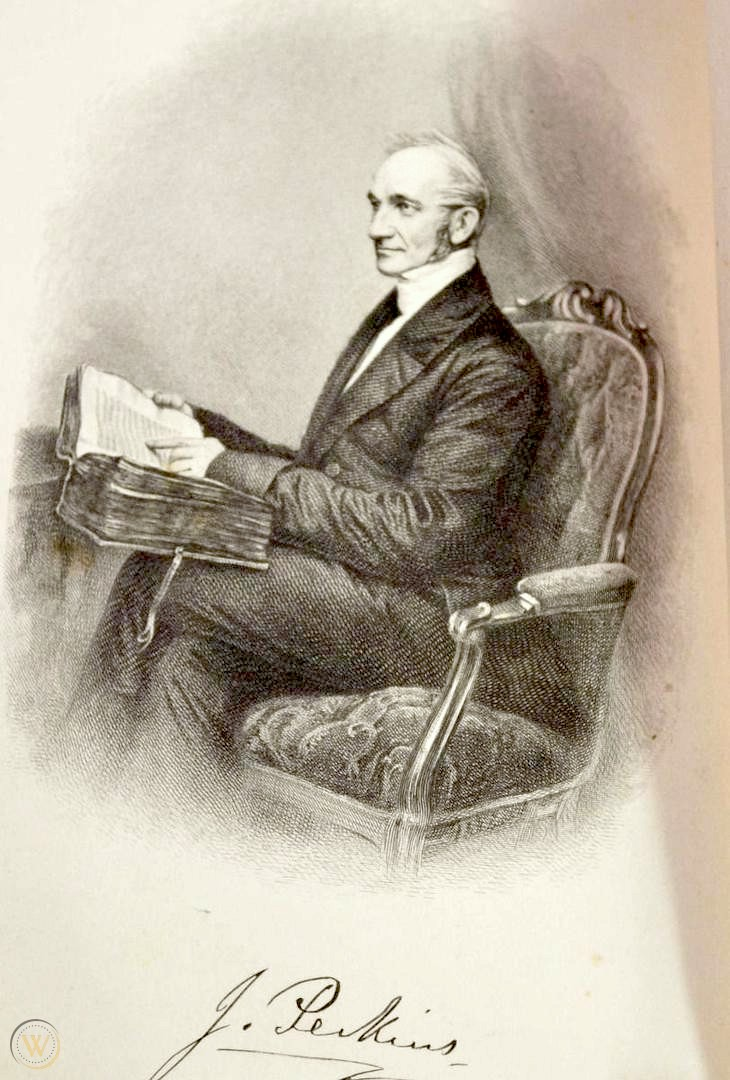
Justin Perkin (1861) engraving

Justin Perkins (March 5, 1805 – December 31, 1869) was an American Presbyterian missionary and linguist. He was the first citizen of the United States to reside in Iran (formally Qajar Iran). He became known for his work among the people there as an "apostle to Persia," according to publications from the United States.

== Biography ==
He was born in the Ireland Parish of West Springfield, Massachusetts, in an area now within the city of Holyoke, Massachusetts. He was the son of William Perkins and Judith Clough Perkins, and a descendant of a John Perkins who arrived in Massachusetts in 1631 and eventually settled in Ipswich, Massachusetts in 1633. He spent his early years on the farm.

At the age of eighteen, he had a religious experience and enrolled at the Westfield Academy, going on to graduate with honors from Amherst College in 1829. He then spent a year teaching at the Amherst Academy, two years studying at the Andover Theological Seminary, and one year as a tutor at Amherst College, before being ordained a Presbyterian minister in the summer of 1833. At roughly the same time, on July 21, 1833, he married Charlotte Bass of Middlebury, Vermont, with whom he would eventually have seven children. Six of those children would die in Persia, including their daughter Judith, about whom an anonymous person wrote the book, The Persian Flower: a memoir of Judith Grant Perkins of Oroomiah, Persia (1872) published in Boston. Only one child, Henry Martyn Perkins, survived Persia and moved with his parents to the United States, where he later wrote a memoir about his father.

=== In Qajar Iran ===
The Americans had used the term "Nestorians" to describe Christian Assyrians in the late 19th century, however that is no longer a preferred term. In September, 1833, he set sail for Qajar Iran as a sponsored missionary for the American Board of Commissioners for Foreign Missions, his specific appointment being for the remaining members of the Assyrian Church of the East in northwestern Iran.

Perkins found that the people he was to serve were living lives of poverty and ignorance, functioning as virtual serfs to their Muslim rulers. To address these matters, he established a missionary center in 1835 in Urmia, with himself, Asahel Grant (an American physician), and their respective wives Charlotte (née Bass) and Judith (née Campbell). Perkins was taught by Qasha Auraham and Mar Yohannan, the latter a bishop of the Assyrian Church of the East.

Mar Yohannan visited the U.S. with Perkins in 1843. Perkins' mission there would continue for 35 years. He then began preaching, generally with the full consent of the local Assyrian church clergy, and often in their churches. He also established a boys' school there, which was the first school to use the learning by teaching method in central Asia. He shortly followed this with several other schools for boys and girls in the surrounding villages, and, later, at the express request of the Muslim government, established similar schools for the Muslim population.

He was also the first to reduce to writing the vernacular of the locals, the modern Syriac language. Thereafter, he produced several volumes in that language for the edification of the people. He established a printing press at Urmia, and used it to produce several works, eighty of which Perkins himself either translated or wrote. These included a magazine Rays of Light, which was devoted to "Religion, Education, Science, Missions, Juvenile Matters, Miscellany and Poetry", and which would continue to be produced until his death. He translated portions of the Christian Bible which appeared at various times. Primary among these were a translation of the New Testament which appeared in 1846, of the Old Testament in 1852, and a referenced version of the Old Testament in 1858. The first two of these contained the text in ancient and modern Syriac in parallel columns. His other works included books for regular and Sunday schools, hymnbooks, and translation of religious works by the likes of Isaac Watts, John Bunyan, Philip Doddridge, and Richard Baxter.

He was widely recognized at the time as a scholar of the Syriac language. The high esteem in which he was held by both the Muslim and Christian populations made it possible for him to acquire various older documents which have been very valuable to scholars over the years.

== Legacy ==
Perkins' presence set the tone for the American presence in Iran during the second half of the 19th century when the missionary-led American presence took responsibility for a broad network of primary and secondary schools in northwest Iran that served to bring literacy among the indigenous Christian Aramaic speakers - members of the Assyrian Church of the East. Following his example, Americans concentrated on improvements in education, book and periodicals publishing, and especially in establishing the first medical college in Iran (1879). The Americans may also be credited with creating the opportunity to put into writing the vernacular Assyrian neo-Aramaic of the Christians of northwest Iran and producing the second periodical in all of Iran (1849), produced in the language at the American Mission press in Urmia.

Perkins was not only a trained missionary, but he was also an ethnically aware watercolorist whose drawings of men, women and children belonging to the various ethnic groups of northwest Iran survive in his books as well as in unpublished drawings. These provide a colorful presentation of ethnic costumes, colors and fabrics available to local populations during the mid-19th century. Perkins and other missionaries in the active Protestant mission in Urmia were probably among the first to present lectures about Iran in the United States as well as being the first Americans with whom the general Persian population had contact. While not officially a diplomat, Perkins, and later missionaries acted much as did provincial consular officers at later times.

== Publications ==
He described his experiences in his writings A Residence of Eight Years in Persia among the Nestorian Christians with Notices of the Muhammedans (1841), and Missionary Life in Persia (1861).

- Perkins, Justin (1841). A Residence of Eight Years in Persia among the Nestorian Christians with Notices of the Muhammedans. Andover, Mass.: Allen, Morrill & Wardwell.
- Perkins, Justin (1861). Missionary life in Persia: Glimpses at a Quarter of a Century of Labors among the Nestorian Christians. Boston, Mass.: American Tract Society.

=== Contributions and articles ===
- Perkins, Justin (1851). "Journal of a Tour from Oroomiah to Mosul, through the Koordish Mountains, and a Visit to the Ruins of Nineveh". Journal of the American Oriental Society. 2: 69, 71-119. doi:10.2307/3217922. JSTOR 3217922.
- Perkins, Justin; Fiske, Fidelia (1857). Nestorian Biography: Being Sketches of Pious Nestorians who Have Died at Oroomiah, Persia. American Board of Commissioners for Foreign Missions. Massachusetts Sabbath School Society.
