= Iran Bethel School =

Girls' School

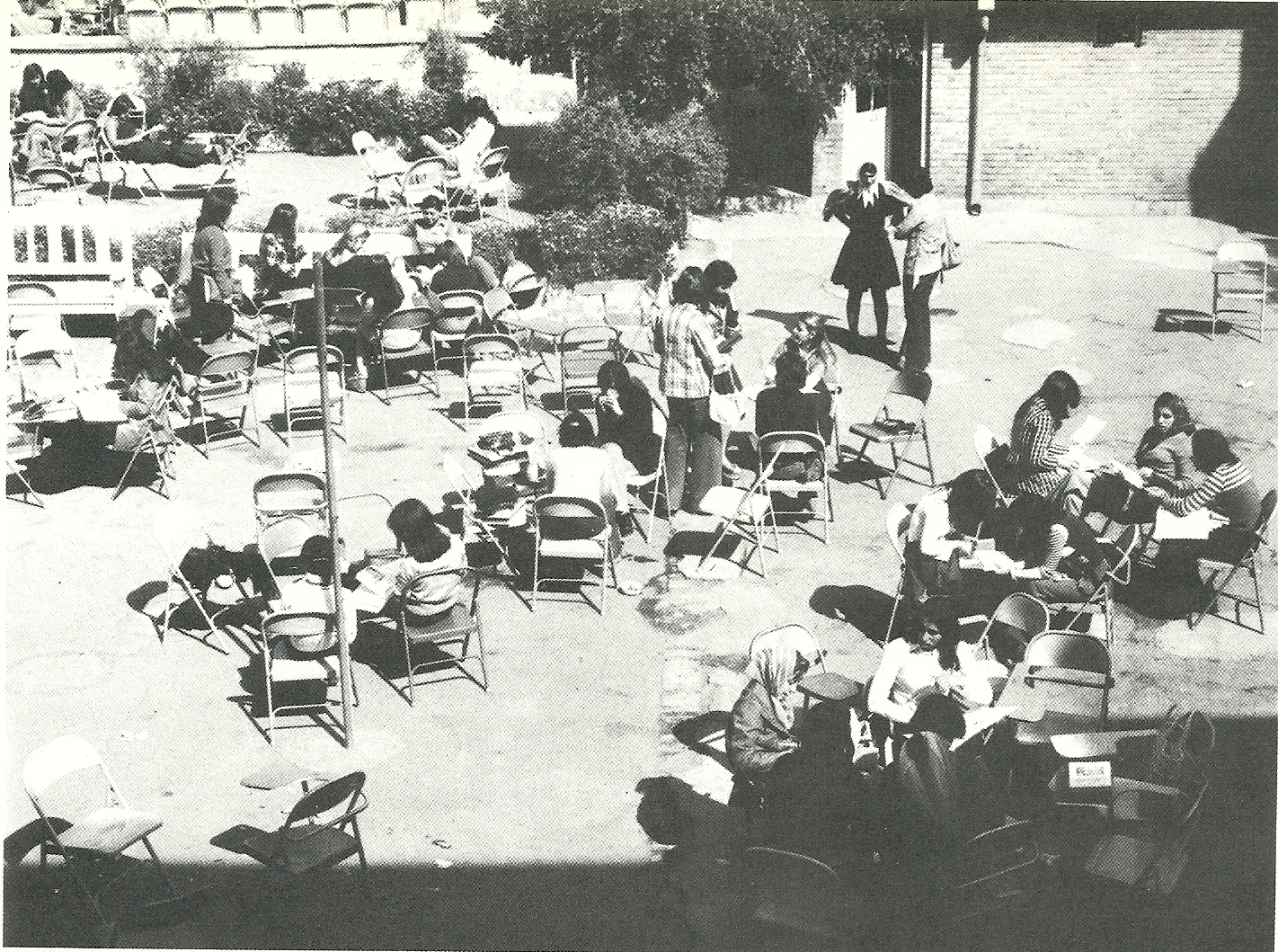
- Damavand College in 1974, in the former campus of Iran Bethel School on Diba Alley

Location
- 27 Diba Street; Tehran; Iran

Information
- Other name: Iran Bethel, Iran Bethel School for Girls, American Girl's College in Tehran, American Mission Iran Bethel's Girls School Tehran
- School type: Initially a girls' primary school with middle school and high school added later. The school then transitioned to a girls' 2-year college and then a 4-year college.
- Motto: "That thy daughters may be as cornerstones, hewn after the fashion of a palace"
- Religious affiliation(s): Presbyterian
- Established: 1874
- Closed: 1968
- Faculty: Annie Woodman Stocking Boyce, Jane Doolittle, Frances M. Gray
- Color(s): Crimson

Iran Bethel School (1874–1968) was a school in Tehran, established by an American Presbyterian missionary organization for girls in 1874. It was the precursor to the Damavand College.

== History ==
The Iran Bethel School opened in 1874 as a girls primary school. It later expanded to a middle school and high school (named Nurbaskhsh). The school initially only enrolled European and Iranian Christian students, until 1888. In the early years of the school they did not charge tuition and provided free board and clothing to students, but by the early 20th century they started to change policy. Other schools started by the Presbyterian missionaries in Iran include Sage College, Fiske Seminary, and Alborz High School (also known as Alborz College).

The Presbyterian Mission Station recorded the purchase of property to be used for a church and school on Qavam e Saltaneh on February 11, 1886. The name "Iran Bethel" was formally approved in 1889. Crimson was chosen for the school color in 1891, and the motto was "That thy daughters may be as cornerstones, hewn after the fashion of a palace".

American Annie Woodman Stocking Boyce, worked as a Presbyterian missionary in Iran, from 1906 until her retirement in 1949. She was assigned to teach in Iran Bethel School for girls.

A landmark year was 1921 which brought a unique young American missionary, Jane Doolittle, whose commitment and dedication would guide the school through the better part of a half-century. She became the school's principal in 1925.

In February 1949, the property at 27 Diba Street was purchased.

In the late 1960s and early 1970s, many Presbyterian missionary schools in Iran were faced with a changing relationship within the local government. In December 1967, a study was conducted to review the future of the Bethel School and its effect on Iran and the Presbyterian religion, and as a result of the study the recommendation was to transfer the school from a two year college to a four year college (with a sizable donation from the church).

The American school's encouraging results on the small Diba campus led the new president, Frances M. Gray in 1966, to consider the formulation of plans for a new campus to meet the growing needs. Two years after she became president of the college, the school was authorized to open as a private girls school (or madreseh ali) in 1968 and became Damavand College.

== Notable alumni ==
- Parvin E'tesami (graduated 1924), poet, later she taught at the school.
- Iran Teymourtash (graduated 1930), Iranian women's activist.
- Sattareh Farmanfarmaian (attended Nurbaskhsh in 1933) pioneering social worker in Iran, author, daughter of nobility.

== Legacy ==
Without the Iran Bethel School and the efforts of Jane Doolittle and Frances M. Gray, the Damavand College would not have been established. The schools improved the education of Iranian women of the Qajar and later Pahlavi dynasty.

Graduates of the Bethel school had sponsored and edited the women's journal Alam-e-Nesvan (World of Women) between 1920 until 1934. This journal was able to publish more freely than some of the state sponsored press.

== See also ==
- Alborz College
- Damavand College
- Fiske Seminary
