= 2012 Victory Bowl =

Northwestern Eagles	Greenville Panthers
(8–2)	(7–2)
27	28
Head coach: Kirk Talley	Head coach: Ordell Walker
	1	2	3	4	OT	Total
Northwestern	0	14	0	7	6	27
Greenville	0	0	14	7	7	28
- Date: November 17, 2012
- Season: 2012
- Stadium: Francis Field
- Location: Greenville, Illinois
- MVP: Offense: Brendan Chambers (Greenville); Defense: Josh Swore (Greenville)
- Referee: Bob Holshouser
- Attendance: 500

The 2012 Victory Bowl was a college football bowl game played on November 17, 2012 at Francis Field in Greenville, Illinois. It featured the Northwestern Eagles against the Greenville Panthers. The Panthers won 28-27 in overtime. It was Greenville's first Victory Bowl win after three previous losses. It was Northwestern's sixth Victory Bowl appearance.

== Game play ==
=== First quarter ===
The game was scoreless in the first period, with Northwestern punting three times and Greenville turning it over twice on downs.

=== Second quarter ===
Northwestern got the scoring started after a Greenville fumble early in the second quarter. Two plays later, Josh Balzer connected with Brian Lecheler for an 88-yard touchdown strike. The Eagles then capped a 66-yard drive with a two-yard TD pass from Balzer to Lecheler with 15 seconds remaining in the half for a 14-0 lead.

=== Third quarter ===
Greenville opened the second half with scoring after Brendan Chambers ran nine yards for a touchdown after a 74-yard scoring drive. Following a Northwestern three-and-out, the Panthers had an 80-yard touchdown pass of their own as Chambers found Anthony Gonzalez to tie the game at 14. Both teams traded punts and fumbles for the rest of the quarter without any scoring.

=== Fourth quarter ===
After being pinned at their own 1-yard line, Greenville put together a 99-yard drive resulting a two-yard touchdown run by Justin Honeycutt for the Panthers' first lead of the game. Greenville threw an interception on its next drive, and Northwestern scored on the ensuing possession with a Tim Youtzy two-yard run with 4:10 left to tie the game at 21. Both teams threw interceptions late in the game, and Greenville missed a 27-yard field goal as time expired, sending the game to overtime.

=== Overtime ===
Greenville won the coin toss and elected to kick off. Youtzy capped an eight-play Northwestern drive with a one-yard TD run, but Ethan Zepp missed the ensuing PAT. Greenville took five plays to get into the end zone on its possession, with Chambers' three-yard touchdown tying the game. Frewin's point-after was successful to win the game for the Panthers, 28-27.

=== Scoring Summary ===
Scoring summary

Quarter	Time	Drive			Team	Scoring information	Score	
Quarter	Time	Plays	Yards	TOP	Team	Scoring information	Northwestern Eagles	Greenville Panthers
2	9:56	2	93	0:48	Northwestern Eagles	Brian Lecheler 88-yard touchdown reception from Josh Balzer, Ethan Zepp kick Good	7	0
2	0:14	13	66	4:51	Northwestern Eagles	Brian Lecheler 2-yard touchdown reception from Josh Balzer, Ethan Zepp kick Good	14	0
3	10:12	14	74	4:42	Greenville Panthers	Brendan Chambers 1-yard touchdown run, Josh Frewin kick Good	14	7
3	8:12	3	80	0:49	Greenville Panthers	Anthony Gonzalez 80-yard touchdown reception from Brendan Chambers, Josh Frewin kick Good	14	14
4	14:21	11	99	3:27	Greenville Panthers	Justin Honeycutt 2-yard touchdown run, Josh Frewin kick Good	14	21
4	4:10	8	64	3:11	Northwestern Eagles	Tim Youtzy 2-yard touchdown run, Ethan Zepp kick Good	21	21
Overtime	-	13	25	-	Northwestern Eagles	Tim Youtzy 1-yard touchdown run, Ethan Zepp kick Failed	27	21
Overtime	-	13	25	-	Greenville Panthers	Brendan Chambers 3-yard touchdown run, Josh Frewin kick Good	27	28
"TOP" = time of possession. For other American football terms, see Glossary of American football.							Northwestern (MN) Eagles	Greenville Panthers
