= Suzanne Allison Davis =

American lawyer

President of Greenville University
- Incumbent
- Assumed office May 2020
- Preceded by: Ivan Filby

Personal details
- Education: Greenville University (BA); University of Illinois at Urbana–Champaign (MBA, JD)

Suzanne Allison Davis is an American attorney and academic administrator serving as the 13th president of Greenville University, a liberal arts university in Greenville, Illinois affiliated with the [Council for Christian Colleges and Universities.

== Education ==
Davis earned a Bachelor of Arts degree in philosophy and political science from Greenville University in 2000. She earned a Master of Business Administration from the Gies College of Business and a Juris Doctor from the University of Illinois College of Law.

== Career ==
After graduating from law school, Davis practiced civil law in Tuscola, Illinois and worked as a professor of business at Eastern Illinois University. In 2012, Davis returned to Greenville University, serving as the chief of staff to then-president Ivan Filby. She later served as founding dean of the university's business school and vice president for university relations. In May 2020, she was named acting president after the resignation of Filby.
