= Fiske Seminary =

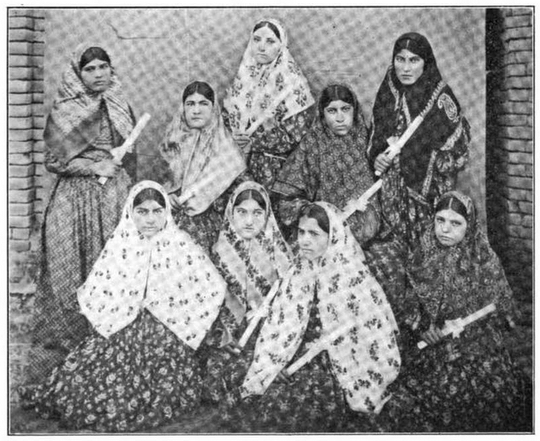
- Students at Fiske Seminary in Urmia, from a 1909 publication

Information
- Former names: Urmia Seminary (1838–1858)
- School type: Missionary girls school
- Religious affiliation(s): Presbyterian
- Established: 1838
- Closed: c. 1978

Fiske Seminary, formerly the Urmia Seminary, was a Missionary girls' school founded by the American Presbyterian Mission in 1838, and located in Urmia, Qajar Iran (present day Iran). It was the first school for girls in Iran. The school is named after Fidelia Fisk, an American Congregationalist and one of missionary founders.

== History ==
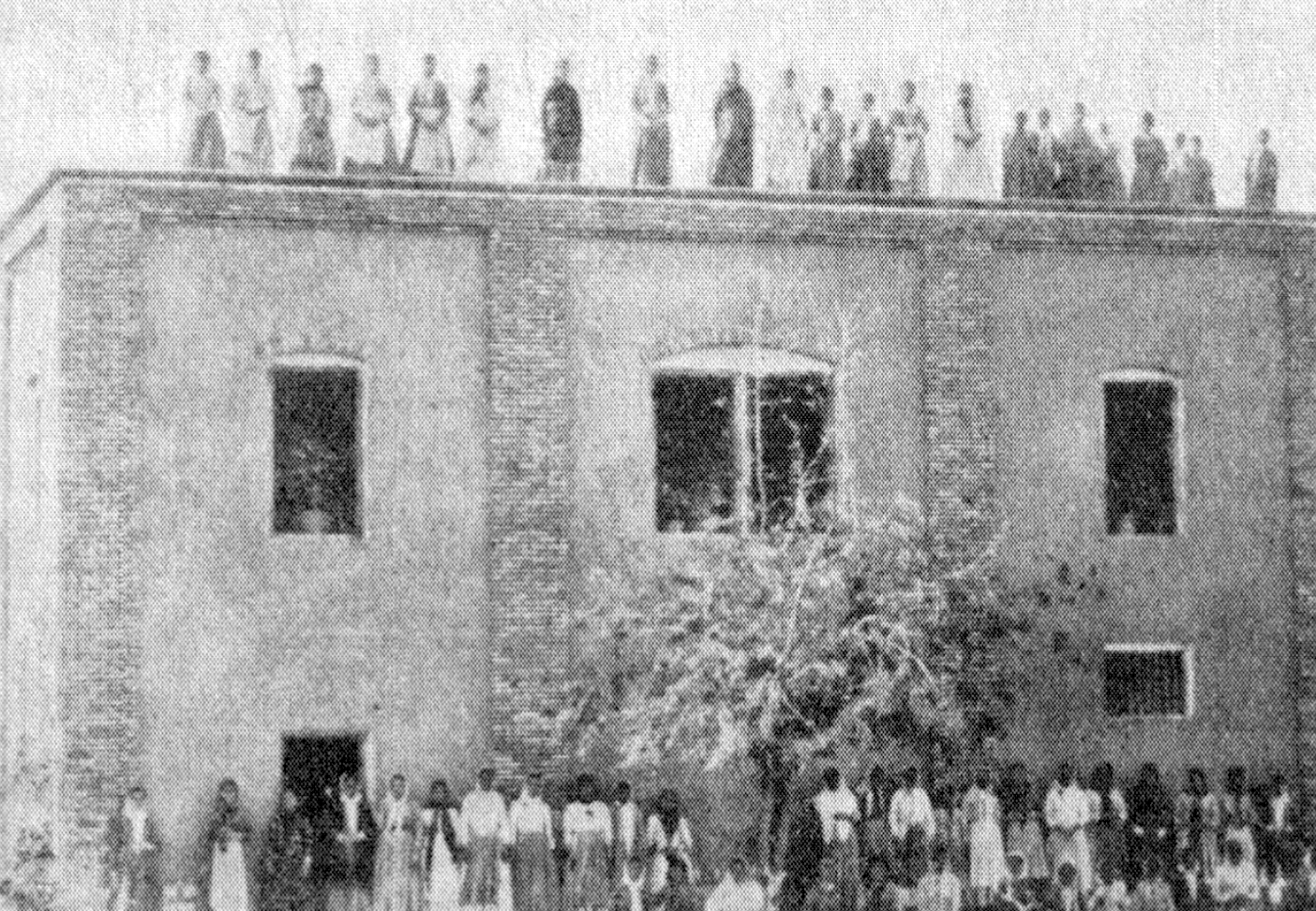
Fiske Seminary (1914)

The school was founded by Fidelia Fisk and the American Presbyterian Mission (also known as the Presbyterian Mission Agency) under the name the Urmia Seminary in Urmia, West Azerbaijan Province, Qajar Iran. The school was modeled after the Mount Holyoke Seminary.

It became a boarding school in 1843. It taught reading, writing, English, arithmetic, natural history, singing, sewing and knitting. When Fidelia Fisk left the school in 1858, the school was renamed the Fiske Seminary.

The school played a major pioneer role. In 1883, only one woman in Urmia was literate; but by 1885, 600 girls had learned to read and write at the school. However, similar to the other missionary girls' schools founded in 19th-century Iran, the school was not allowed to accept Muslims girls as students, but could only accept Christian, Zoroastrian or Jewish students until 1906.

== See also ==
- American Board of Commissioners for Foreign Missions
- Iran Bethel School
