= Nancy Jane Dean =

American educator and Presbyterian missionary

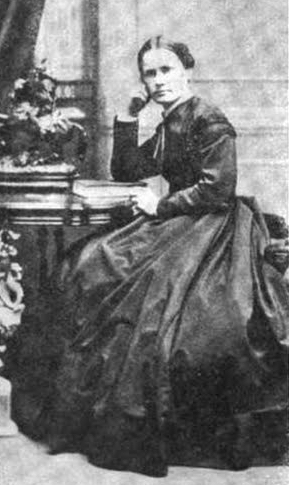
- Dean, from a 1911 publication
- Born: April 8, 1837; Livonia Township, Michigan, U.S.
- Died: March 5, 1926 (aged 88); Detroit, Michigan, U.S.
- Other names: Jennie Dean, N. J. Dean
- Occupation(s): Presbyterian missionary, educator, principal

Nancy Jane Dean (April 8, 1837 – March 5, 1926), often referred to as Jennie Dean or N. J. Dean, was an American educator and Presbyterian missionary serving Assyrian Christians in Qajar Iran (now Iran). She served as the head of Fiske Seminary, a girls' boarding school in Urmia, West Azerbaijan Province.

== Early life ==
Nancy Jane Dean was born on her family's farm in Livonia Township, near Plymouth, Michigan, the youngest of the thirteen children of Gabriel Dean and Lydia Bradner Dean. Both of her parents were born in New York state.

She trained as a teacher at the Michigan State Normal School in Ypsilanti, Michigan, graduating in 1860. Dean was a school teacher in Michigan for six years.

== Career ==
Mount Holyoke Seminary graduate Fidelia Fiske founded Fiske Seminary, a girls' boarding school at Urmia in 1843, to educate Christian Assyrian girls (which at the time were referred to as "Nestorians", and is no longer a preferred term) and to train teachers. Fiske left the school and Iran in 1858 for health reasons. After her departure it was renamed Fiske Seminary. Nancy Jane Dean arrived at Urmia to teach at the school in 1868, and became the school's principal. She took a furlough from 1875 to 1878, and spoke to church groups about her work.

In 1890, the Urmia mission reported that "Miss Dean, the faithful worker of twenty-two years, has been quite broken down... she has never given up entirely, and her presence, her experience and her spirituality exert untold influence over the girls of the boarding school." Nancy Jane Dean left the mission field in 1892, in poor health. "Her presence and influence will be long missed," commented one report. As she was leaving, before reaching Tabriz, her pack train was attacked by vandals and some of her possessions were taken.

She returned briefly to Persia in 1899, before permanently retiring in 1904. In retirement, Dean continued to lecture on Persia and work with Presbyterian women's groups. In 1920 and 1923, she was an honored guest at meetings of the Woman's Missionary Society of the Presbytery of Detroit.

== Personal life ==
Nancy Jane Dean died in Detroit in 1926, aged 88 years.
