= Greenville University =

Private university in Greenville, Illinois, U.S.

- Former name: Greenville College (1892–2017)
- Motto: Preparing Students for Lives of Character and Service
- Type: Private university
- Established: 1892; 134 years ago
- Accreditation: HLC
- Religious affiliation: Free Methodist
- Academic affiliations: Council for Christian Colleges and Universities
- Endowment: $21.2 million (2019)
- President: Suzanne Allison Davis
- Faculty: 101
- Students: 1,104 (Fall 2024)
- Undergraduates: 986 (Fall 2024)
- Postgraduates: 118 (Fall 2024)
- Location: Greenville, Illinois, U.S. 38°53′37″N 89°24′31″W
- Campus: Small town, 50 acres
- Colors: Orange & black
- Nickname: Panthers
- Sporting affiliations: NCAA Division III – SLIAC – Upper Midwest Athletic Conference
- Mascot: Hoguey Panther
- Website: greenville.edu
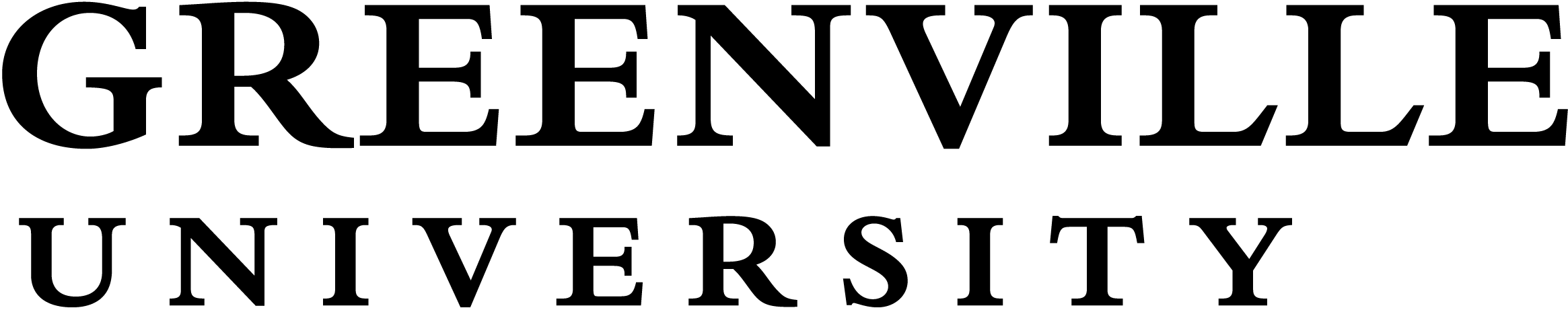

Greenville University is a private university in Greenville, Illinois, United States. It is affiliated with the Free Methodist Church. Established as Greenville College in 1892, the institution was renamed Greenville University in 2017.

== History ==
In 1855, Stephen Morse and Almira Blanchard founded a college for women, Almira College, which shared an affiliation with Baptists, and educated young women. A change in leadership, affiliation, and organization occurred in 1892. At that time, the Central Illinois Conference of the Free Methodist Church purchased the property of Almira College and named it Greenville College. The institution was restructured to offer a co-educational experience. The institution was also incorporated as an independent college under the leadership of the Free Methodist Church. Greenville College was renamed Greenville University in 2017.

== Code of conduct ==
Students attending Greenville University are expected to adhere to a lifestyle that is codified and asks that the student agree to certain principles that the school calls "Christ-honoring", outlined in a document known as the Lifestyle Statement. Violations of the lifestyle statement are handled through a grace-based system which seeks to help students recover from any negative effects (e.g. addiction, emotional distress) and rehabilitate them to live according to what they believe is Christ's purpose for their life.

The Lifestyle Statement exists to keep the GU community accountable for having a healthy lifestyle that keeps the individual in line with God's redemptive plan. It includes instructions for all students to avoid: "backbiting, cheating, dishonesty, drunkenness, gossip, immodesty of dress, lying, occult practices, profanity, sexual promiscuity (including adultery, homosexual behavior, pre-marital sex), theft, and vulgarity (including crude language)." Other actions that students must agree to refrain from, both while on and away from campus, include: "the use of tobacco in any form, alcoholic beverages, hallucinogenic drugs and substances (including marijuana), or narcotics not authorized by a physician", gambling, and using or possessing pornography. And, in keeping with the institution's focus on Christian principles, the document states: "Members of the community are to observe the Lord's Day (Sunday) as a day set apart primarily for worship, fellowship, ministry, and rest." These principles are set in place to hold students accountable for creating a learning environment that intends to stands out from other universities and offer unique benefits to the health and well-being of the student. Greenville University states that it is committed to providing support without judgment to anyone suffering from any kind of problem, addiction, or mental illness. Struggling students are often encouraged to receive counseling or meet with a mentor in order to provide professional support as they attempt to make lifestyle changes.

Undergraduate students are not required to sign a statement of faith; however, they must fulfill at least 10 chapel credits each semester. Most of these credits are fulfilled by attending a chapel service that is available on Monday, Wednesday, and Friday of every academic week at 9:30am.

== Campus ==
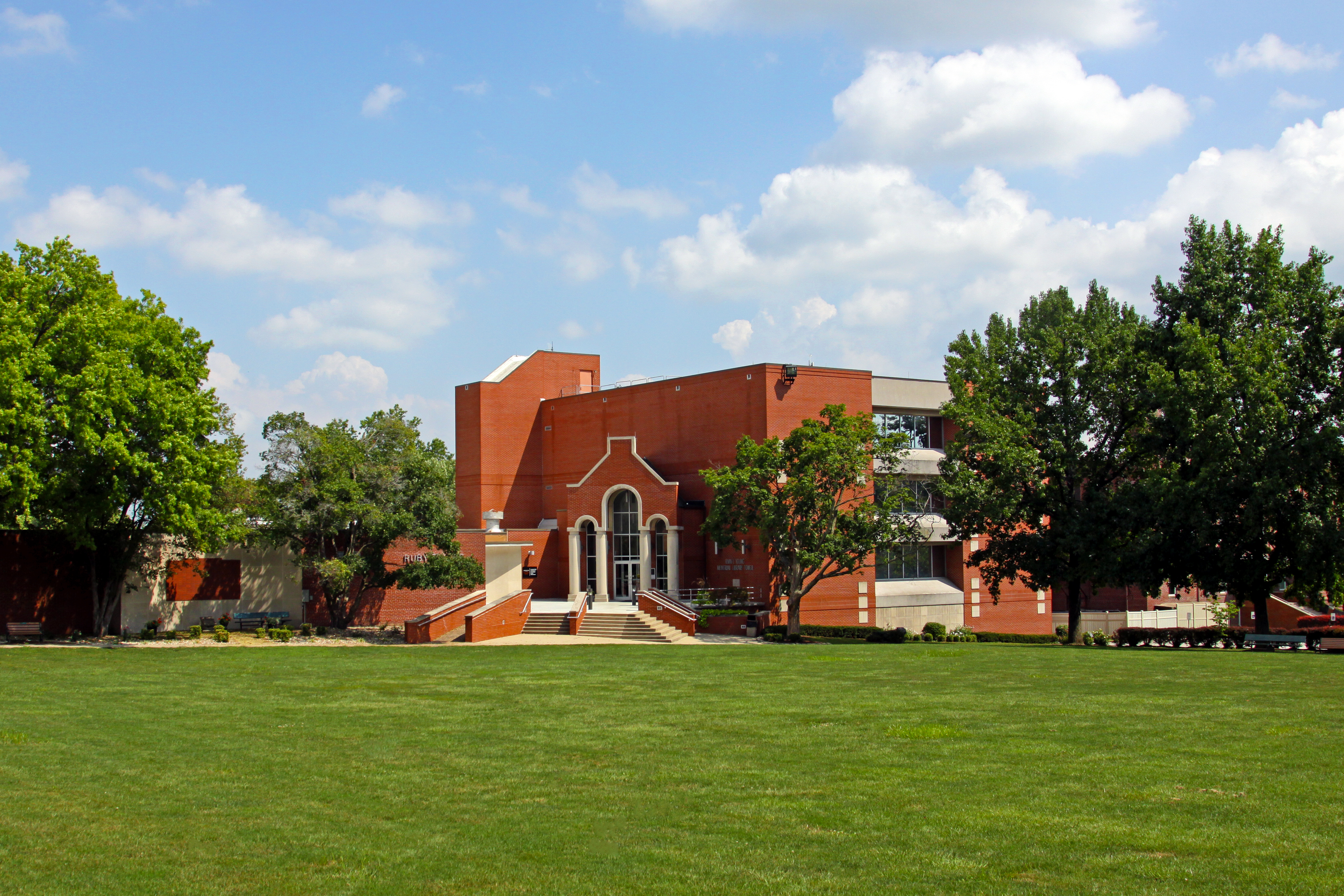
A view of Greenville's library

Nearly 800 students live on campus in a variety of residence halls including Joy Hall, Janssen Hall, Burritt Hall, Holtwick Hall, Blakenship Apartments, Tenney Hall, Kinney Hall, and Ellen J. Mannoia Hall (formerly known as College Avenue Hall). An additional 101-bed dormitory, called Hood Hall (formerly known as West Oak Hall), opened in the fall of 2007. Students also live in a number of college-owned houses. In the summer of 2007, Janssen Hall (originally constructed in 1959) was gutted and completely updated and remodeled. Joy Hall was renovated in the summer of 2011 to bring it up to modern safety code.

The college is home to the only museum dedicated to the works of sculptor Richard Bock, an associate of Frank Lloyd Wright. The first classes of Almira College in the 1850s were held in John Brown White's home, which is called the Almira College House; it houses Bock's sculptures.

In 1999, under the leadership of President Mannoia, the college became the first campus in the nation to install a completely wireless internet network across the entire campus.

=== Hogue Hall ===
- Old Main, Almira College
- U.S. National Register of Historic Places
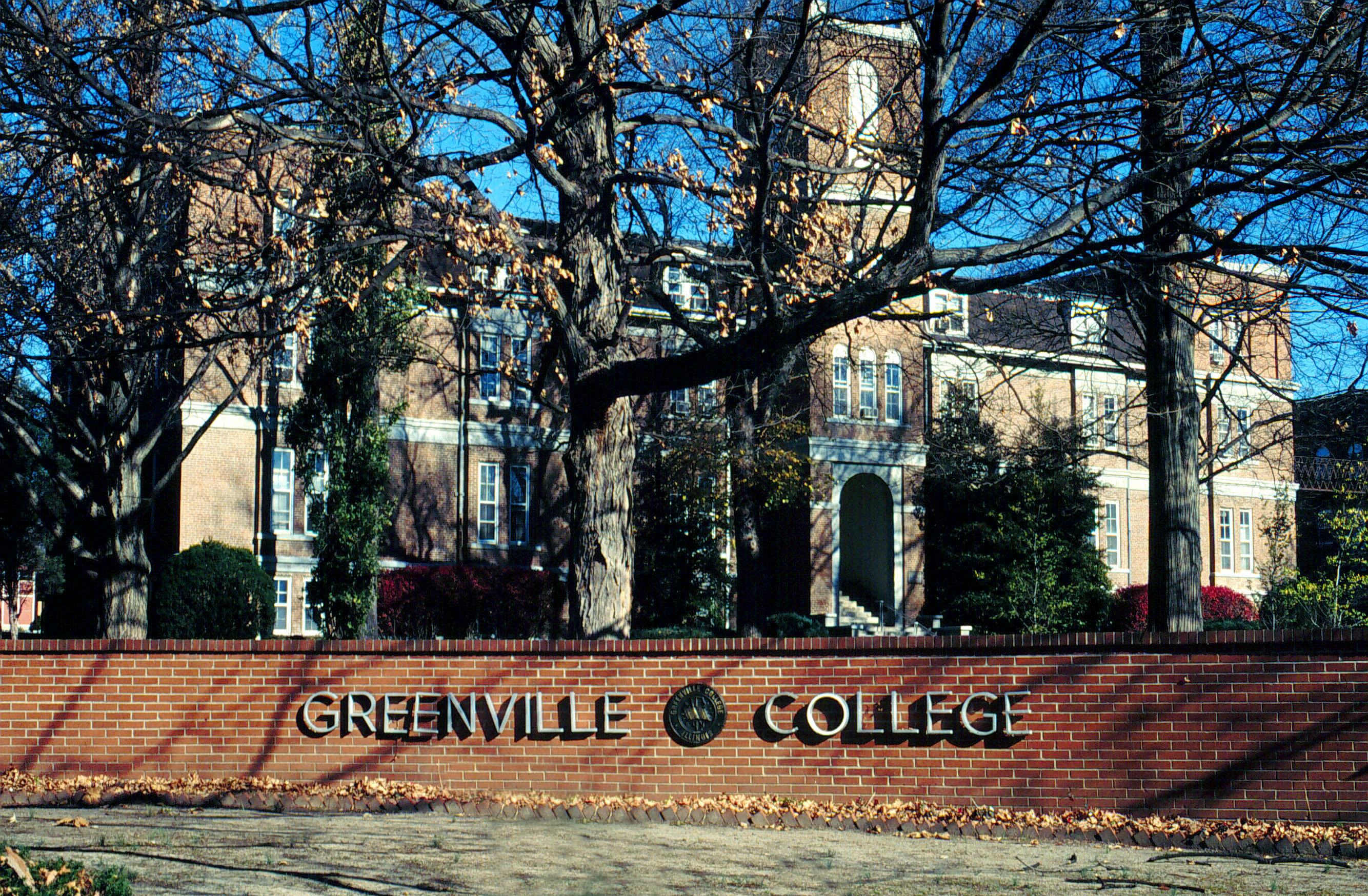
- Hogue Hall and college sign c. 2006

- Location within Illinois Location within the United States
- Location: 315 E. College St., Greenville, Illinois
- Coordinates: 38°53′35″N 89°24′31″W
- Area: 1 acre (0.40 ha)
- Built: 1860
- Architectural style: Italianate
- NRHP reference No.: 75000638
- Added to NRHP: April 21, 1975

In Memory of John Brown White, Teacher, Counsellor, and Friend, First President, Almira College, Founded in 1855. Placed By His Grateful Pupils 1931.

— Plaque on Hogue Hall

The previous oldest building on campus, Wilson T. Hogue Hall, originally housed Almira College. Bricks for the building were made on the front campus in 1855, and the building was erected between 1856 and 1864 and given the name "Old Main". Hogue Hall contained the data processing center and administrative offices of the college on the lower two floors. The upper two floors, originally dormitory rooms, provided offices for the faculty and a few small classrooms. Informal conversation between faculty and students frequently took place in these offices. An open "bridge" at the third-floor level led to the third floor of LaDue Auditorium and Marston Hall, which serves as the main classroom building. This building was part of the National Register of Historic Places.

In the spring of 2007, then-President Vincent James Mannoia was made aware of structural problems within Hogue Hall that led to a remodeling project in the building. In the summer of 2007, remodeling work on the lower floor found significant cracks in the timber holding up the masonry wall. When it became aware of the situation, the college stopped the remodeling and consulted with a structural engineer and architectural experts on old buildings for advice. These experts' initial inspection uncovered major structural concerns in the east wing of the historic building. Classes were moved from the four classrooms on the third floor of the building, and faculty with offices located in the east wing were relocated to the classrooms. After extensive consultation with local citizens, faculty, staff, alumni, and the board of trustees, President Mannoia determined that Hogue Hall should be torn down in the summer of 2008, despite objections from Illinois' state preservation agency. The site of Hogue Hall is now contains Hogue Tower Memorial, a tower recreated in the shape of a tower that used to stand center of Hogue Hall. Original plans were to rebuild a new Hogue Hall in the same location, the college board of trustees is deciding whether to rebuild it in another location.

== Athletics ==
Greenville athletics wordmark

Greenville University teams, nicknamed the Panthers, participate as a member of the National Collegiate Athletic Association's Division III. The Panthers are a member of the St. Louis Intercollegiate Athletic Conference (SLIAC). The Panthers also compete in the National Christian College Athletic Association (NCCAA). Men's sports include baseball, basketball, cross country, football, gymnastics, soccer, tennis, track and field, and volleyball, while women's sports include basketball, cross country, gymnastics, soccer, softball, tennis, track and field, and volleyball. Club programs include bass fishing, cheer, dance, and esports. The football team participates in the Upper Midwest Athletic Conference; the men's gymnastics team participates in the Eastern College Athletic Conference; and the women's gymnastics team, which had been independent through 2025–26, now competes in the Wisconsin Intercollegiate Athletic Conference.

Greenville added men's volleyball in the 2015–16 school year (2016 season); since the SLIAC only sponsors volleyball for women, that team initially competed in the Midwest Collegiate Volleyball League. Men's volleyball moved to the College Conference of Illinois and Wisconsin for the ultimately COVID-affected 2020 season. Greenville dropped men's volleyball immediately afterward, eventually reinstating the sport in 2024–25 as a Division III independent.

Greenville's football team won the Victory Bowl, the NCCAA national championship game, in 2012 and have been the National Runner-up in 2000, 2009, 2011, 2013, and 2019. The men's indoor track and field team has won four NCCAA national championships, in 2002, 2003, 2004, and 2005, while the men's outdoor track and field team has won six NCCAA national championships, in 2001, 2002, 2003, 2004, 2005, and 2006. The GU women's basketball team won the NCCAA national championship in 2017.

== Notable alumni ==
=== Bands ===
| Name | Class year | Notability | Reference(s) |
|---|---|---|---|
| Augustana | | rock-n-roll band; formed on campus in 2002–2003; members attended but did not graduate | |
| Jars of Clay | | Christian rock band; formed on campus in the early 1990s, granted honorary degrees in 2001 after dropping out in 1994 | |
| Paper Route | | Indie/Rock Band; members met at Greenville College | |

=== People ===
| Name | Class year | Notability | Reference(s) |
|---|---|---|---|
| Ernest L. Boyer | | Chancellor of the State University of New York system | |
| Bob Briner | | Sports management professional and namesake of the university's Robert A. Briner Salt and Light Award is named after him. | |
| Matt Bronleewe | | Musician, producer, and author | |
| Leila Fletcher | 1916 | Piano pedagogue; Greenville College was Leila Fletcher's sixth form college for girls and young women | http://www.leilafletcher.com/ |
| Coleman Griffith | | Sport psychologist | |
| John Hammond | | Professional basketball manager. Famous for drafting Giannis Antetokounmpo | http://www.nba.com/magic/news/magic-name-john-hammond-general-manager |
| D. Ray Heisey | | Professor at Damavand College in Tehran, Iran | |
| Alfred Harrison Joy | | Astronomer | |
| Nicholas Morrow | 2017 | Professional football player | https://www.philadelphiaeagles.com/free-agency/ |
| Mary Previte | | Author and politician | |
| Stephanie Smith | 2006 | Singer/songwriter | |
| Esther Snyder | | Cofounder of In-N-Out Burger | |
| Jeremiah Williamson | | 10th Bishop of the Episcopal Diocese of Albany | https://albanyepiscopaldiocese.org/bishop/ |
| Howard Zahniser | 1928 | "Father of the Wilderness Act" | https://wilderness.net/learn-about-wilderness/howard-zahniser.php |
| Paul Garrett | 2024 | D3 All- American, 2x OPOY, 4x 1st Team All- Conference, 2x 1st Team Punt Returner, 1x NCCAA POTY, 3x NCCAA 1st Team, 1x NCCAA 2nd Team, and running back for the Iowa Barnstormers | |

== Faculty ==
1956 Prohibition Party candidate for President of the United States, Enoch A. Holtwick, was a professor of history and government at Greenville College and is honored at GU through the Enoch A. Holtwick Literary Award and Enoch A. Holtwick Hall, a residence building.

GU professor Richard Huston became a Fulbright scholar for the third time in July 2007. He spent a year lecturing at the Universidad Nacional Autonoma de Nicaragua in Leon, Nicaragua, beginning in February 2008.

According to the Faculty Handbook, full-time faculty are reviewed regularly in their second, fourth, and sixth years of employment. For those faculty on the tenure track, the sixth year review is usually a tenure review. Post-tenure reviews occur every seven years. In each review, teaching and professional growth are evaluated. Faculty are also evaluated in at least one other area: scholarship, service, and/or governance. Greenville University says the review process is based on its published standards and what it calls its commitment to excellence in teaching.

== See also ==
- Phyllis Holmes
- Robert Smith
