= Vincent James Mannoia Jr. =

Vincent James ("Jim") Mannoia, Jr.

10th President of Greenville College
- In office 1999–2008
- Preceded by: Robert ("Ish") Smith
- Succeeded by: Larry Linnamen

Personal details
- Born: August 2, 1949 (age 77) Beloit, Wisconsin
- Spouse(s): Ellen Jean Schroeder (dec), Jane Hideko Higa
- Children: Vincent James Mannoia, IV, Eva Marie Mannoia Weiler
- Education: Massachusetts Institute of Technology; Saint Louis University; Washington University in St. Louis
- Profession: Consultant, professor of philosophy, college administrator, minister

Vincent James ("Jim") Mannoia, Jr. is an independent consultant in higher education. He was the tenth president of Greenville College from 1999 to 2008.

== Early life and education ==
The eldest son of Vincent James ("Jim") Mannoia and Florence Eva Gilroy, Mannoia was born in Beloit, Wisconsin on August 2, 1949. In 1962 he moved with his parents to Sao Paulo, Brazil where he lived until returning to Boston for college.

Mannoia completed high school at Escola Graduada de Sao Paulo in 1967. He received a Bachelor of Science in Physics from the Massachusetts Institute of Technology in 1971 with an undergraduate thesis "The Hanle Effect Using Cadmium Ion Vapor Lasers." He studied philosophy of science at Saint Louis University, then received the M.A. and Ph.D. in philosophy in Arts and Sciences at Washington University in St. Louis in 1975. His dissertation in metaphysics was "Whitehead's Ontological Principle: A Defense and Interpretation."

He married Ellen Jean Schroeder in 1972, with whom he had two children. In 2007, his wife Ellen died after a 20-year battle with breast cancer, and one year later he retired. In 2013 he married Jane Hideko Higa, who contracted ALS and died in 2014. Mannoia married Elizabeth Poje in 2016 and resides in Santa Barbara, California.

== Career ==
In 1975, Mannoia took an appointment at Grove City College as assistant professor of physics from 1975 to 1978 when he became assistant professor of philosophy at Westmont College. Over the next fifteen years, he taught metaphysics, philosophy of science, history of philosophy, and logic. During those same years, he was ordained elder in the Free Methodist Church and became associate academic dean from 1985 to 1987, and from 1989 to 1991.

From 1987 to 1989, he was visiting lecturer in philosophy at the University of Zimbabwe. He had first visited Zimbabwe (then Rhodesia) with a traveling group in southern Africa in the summer of 1970, when he also worked in Hillbrow, Johannesburg.

In 1993 Mannoia was appointed vice-president and dean of the faculty at Houghton College where his contributions included significant changes in the general education requirements and in the use of technology across campus (e.g. a campus-wide laptop program). He also launched the Houghton Institute of Integrative Studies.

In October 1998 Mannoia was appointed the tenth president of Greenville College. Changes during his presidency included curriculum (a new general education curriculum. He served as the lead professor for the capstone course required of all seniors culminating in the Common Day of Learning), technology (the first all-wireless campus in the nation), campus (major construction and remodeling), finances (a major comprehensive campaign), and enrollment (doubled and expanded to adult and graduate programs).

Since 2008, Mannoia has worked part-time teaching philosophy at Old Dominion University, Regent University, and Azusa Pacific University. He has spoken across the country at faculty workshops focusing on Christian liberal arts, and has consulted internationally, including for the Ministry of Education in Rwanda, the Council for Christian Colleges and Universities, Alphacrucis College, Christ's College, and as managing consultant for the Medes American University Strategy Group. He serves on the board of Seattle Pacific University, Immanuel University, Hope Africa University (which he helped to found in 1999), the Center for Transformation Leadership, and the Global Business Leadership Center. In 2009 he was appointed senior fellow for International Development at the Council for Christian Colleges and Universities.

== Bibliography ==
1. What is Science: An Introduction to Structure and Methodology of Science, (Rowman & Littlefield: Lanham, MD, 1980)
2. Christian Liberal Arts: An Education that Goes Beyond, (Rowman & Littlefield: Lanham, MD, 2000)
3. Paradox and Virtue: Talks to My Students, (Westbow Press: Bloomimngton, IN, 2021)

Academic offices
Preceded by Robert Smith	President of Greenville College; 1998 – 2008	Succeeded by Larry Linnamen
