= Asahel Grant =

American physician

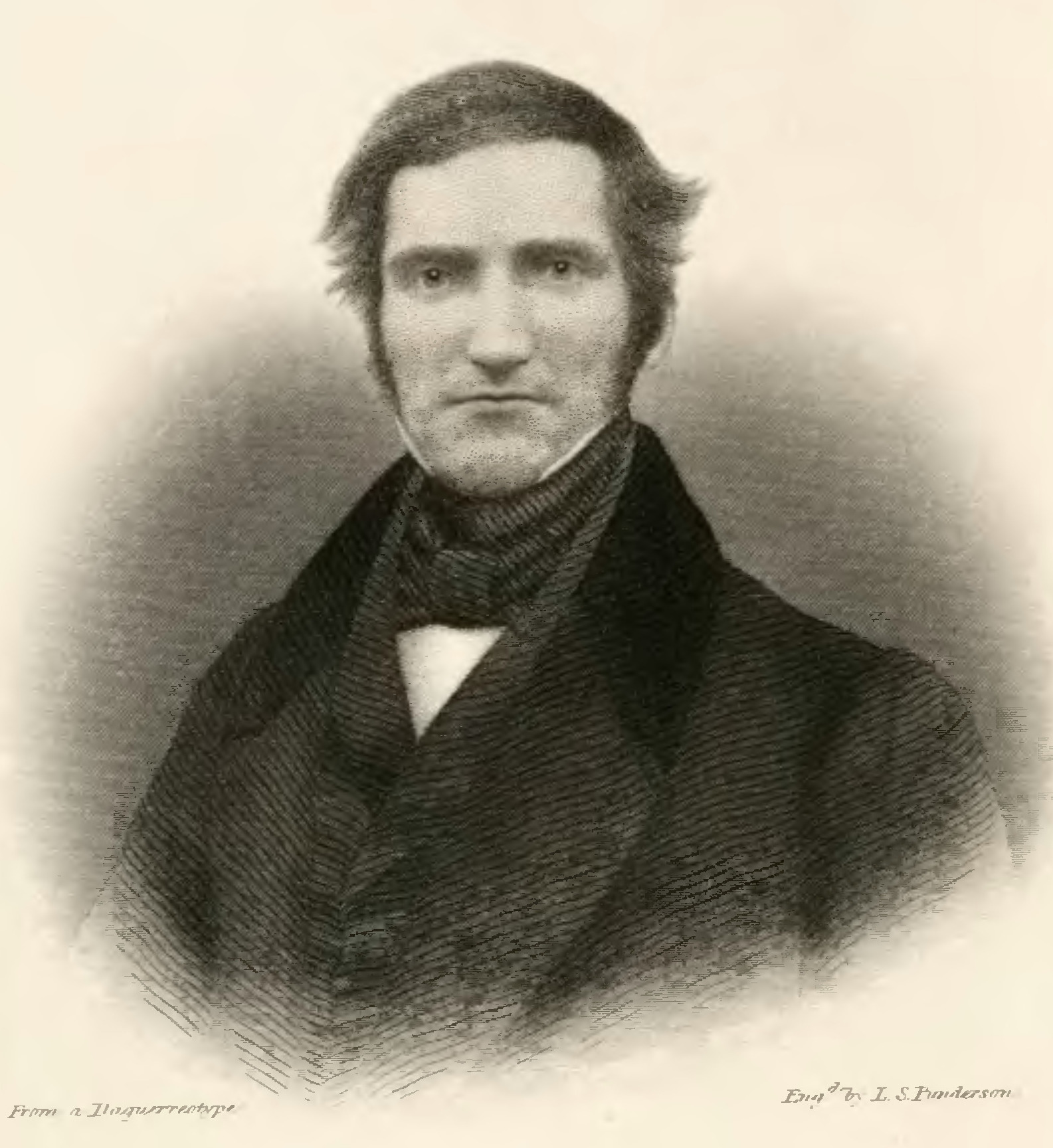
- Born: August 17, 1807; Marshall, New York, US
- Died: April 24, 1844 (aged 36)
- Known for: One of the first American missionaries to Iraq

Asahel Grant (August 17, 1807 – April 24, 1844) was one of the first American missionaries to Iraq.

Asahel Grant was born at Marshall, New York, studied medicine at Pittsfield, Massachusetts, and practiced in Utica, New York. In 1835 he went as a missionary with the American Board of Commissioners for Foreign Missions to Iran. He settled at Urmia and worked among the Nestorians there and elsewhere in western Asia.

He established a missionary center in 1835 in Urmia, with himself, missionary Justin Perkins and their respective wives Judith Grant (née Campbell) and Charlotte Perkins (née Bass).

He died in Mosul in the Ottoman Empire. He traveled throughout the Middle East, but had little success in converting the Nestorians, whom he considered among the "ten lost tribes" of Israel. He wrote The Nestorians and an appeal for Christian doctors to engage in missionary work. Like David Livingstone before him (although not as famous), Grant thrilled western audiences with his adventures, inspiring a number of biographies, including those cited on this page. His success as a physician not only saved his life on several occasions, but opened the way for missionary successors.

== Family ==
Asahel was married twice. He first married Electa Loomis in 1827, but was widowed in 1831; they had two sons. He then married Judith Campbell, but was widowed again in 1839.

== Books ==
- The Nestorians, or the Lost Tribes (1841)
- Memoir of Asahel Grant, M.D.: Missionary to the Nestorians (1847), ed. A. C. Lethrop

== See also ==
- Nestorianism

== Bibliography ==
- Robert, Dana Lee (1996). American Women in Mission: A Social History of Their Thought and Practice. Mercer University Press. pp. 109–110. ISBN 978-0-86554-549-6.
- Taylor, Gordon (2008). Fever and Thirst: An American Doctor Amid the Tribes of Kurdistan, 1835-1844. Academy Chicago Publishers.
