= Mary C. Thompson =

Mary C. Thompson (March 4, 1913 – April 5, 2005) was Dean of Damavand College in Tehran from 1969 until her retirement in 1978.

Mary received an honorary doctor of humane letters from Muskingum in 1973 and earned a master's degree from Stetson University in 1954.

== Biography ==
Mary Thompson was born in Oil City, Pennsylvania, on March 4, 1913, and grew up in Oil City, graduating from Oil City High School. She then attended Muskingum College in New Concord, Ohio, graduating in 1934. After working for the Pennsylvania State Relief, teaching, and attending what is now the New York Theological Seminary, Mary went to Egypt in 1939 as a missionary for the Presbyterian Church and became a teacher at the American Mission School in Tanta. She later became the school's principal. Mary Thompson, spent 25 years there and remained in Egypt throughout World War II, including the battle of El Alamein, and later lived in Cairo.

The Year book of Damavand College 1975-76 adds; She developed educational programs in ten schools in Egypt; trained teachers in the Sudan; and prepared an educational survey of schools and colleges throughout northern India, Iran, and Lebanon, before coming to Damavand

In 1968 Mary became academic dean of Damavand College in Tehran - Iran, remaining there until her retirement in 1978. Returning to New York, she served on the board of trustees of New York Theological Seminary and was named trustee Emeriti. She also was an active session member of Fifth Avenue Presbyterian Church.

== Death ==
She died on April 5, 2005, in New York City, New York.

== Sources ==
- CHARLES E., BREWSTER. Damavand College - Attempts a Breakthrough (New World Outlook- New Series Vol. XXXI No. 9, - Whole Series Vol. LXI No. 5- May, Editor, Arthur J. Moore Jr.; Managing Editor, Charles E. Brewster, Planning and Coordination, Stanley J. Rowland Jr.; Associate Editor, Ellen Clark, Art Director, Roger C. Sadler, 47 S Riverside Drive, New York, New York 1 0027, 1971 ed.).
- Damavand College Year book 1974–75, p. 4
- Damavand College Year book 1975–76, p. 7
- Damavand College Year book 1976–77, p. 10
- Damavand College Year book 1977–78, p. 3
