= Jane Doolittle =

American Presbyterian missionary (1899–1990)

- Born: Jane Elizabeth Doolittle; April 14, 1899; Reading, Pennsylvania, U.S.
- Died: March 1, 1990 (aged 90); Cortland, New York, U.S.
- Burial place: Cortland Rural Cemetery
- Education: Wells College
- Years active: 1921–1978
- Known for: American Presbyterian missionary in Tehran, educator, school administrator

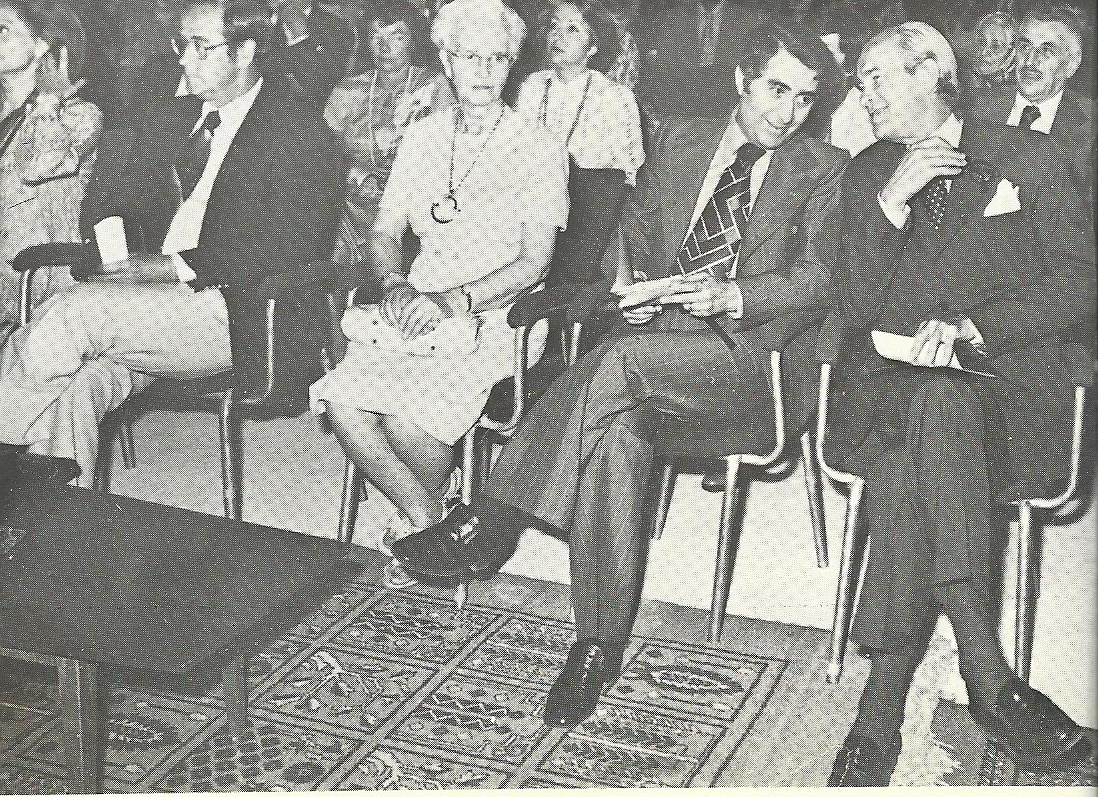
Jane Doolittle in a meeting in Iran Bethel School

Jane Elizabeth Doolittle (1899–1990) was the principal of Iran Bethel School; an American Presbyterian missionary school for Girls in Tehran from 1925 to 1968. She was an American Missionary who came to Tehran in 1921 and remained there until 1979. Doolittle served for many years as the principal of Iran Bethel School for Girls, which was the immediate forerunner of Damavand College. She also founded a medical clinic for women and children in need.

== Biography ==
Doolittle was born 14 April 1899 in Reading, Pennsylvania, to Presbyterian parents Grace (née Ferguson) and Orrin Sage Doolittle. Shortly after her graduation from Wells College in 1921, Doolittle came to Tehran, Iran.

She went to Tehran in order to respond to an urgent appeal to replace the biology teacher at the Iran Bethel School for Girls (also known as the American Presbyterian School for Girls in Tehran). Although her main goal at that time was to become a physician. Doolittle accepted a three-year assignment, which eventually stretched into nearly 58 years. In 1925, she was appointed as the principal of Iran Bethel School until its closing in 1968.

== Activities in Tehran ==
In 1939, as Reza Shah was favorably inclined towards Germany and was convinced that Germans would be victors in the World War II, shortly before the outbreak of war he ordered for the closure of many educational works. As a result, a number of missionaries resigned and left Iran, but Doolittle revived the name of Iran Bethel School with the help of Mrs. Paye. Besides giving part-time education to girls, she also ran a clinical center for poor women and their children which was known as the "Doolittle Clinic project".

By 1971, Doolittle had been in Persia for 50 years. At a celebration in her honor, she was presented with a gold medal by the Minister of Education of Iran, the highest educational award ever given in Iran.

== Late life, death and legacy ==
In 1977, rumors stated that the Ministry of Health would close all private clinics, including the Doolittle Clinic. Hoping to avoid this, Doolittle asked an Iranian doctor to take the clinic under his jurisdiction, thus insuring its continuance.

In 1979, with the collapse of Pahlavi dynasty and the Islamic revolution in Iran, Doolittle left Iran after over five decades of living and working in Iran and she moved back to the United States. She felt home sick for Iran and longed to go back, but was never able to. In her old age she lived in Cortland, New York in an apartment furnished by her classmates from Wells College. She died on 1 March 1990 in Cortland, New York at the age of 90 and was buried in the Cortland Rural Cemetery.

A book was written about Doolittle, Is Love Lost?: Mosaics in the Life of Jane Doolittle (1988) authored by Elizabeth Kay C. Voorhees.
