= D. Ray Heisey =

Kent State University professor

- Born: 1932; Gladwin, Michigan, U.S.
- Died: May 20, 2011 (aged 78–79); Cleveland, Ohio, U.S.
- Occupation: Professor Emeritus
- Spouse: Susanne VanValin
- Children: 3

Academic background
- Education: Greenville College, Messiah College, Ohio State University, Northwestern University

D. Ray Heisey (1932–2011) was emeritus professor of intercultural communication at Kent State University.

== Early life and education ==
Heisey was born in Gladwin, Michigan, and grew up in Louisville, Ohio. After attending Greenville College, Messiah College, Ohio State University, he started studying in a PhD program at Northwestern University.

== Career ==
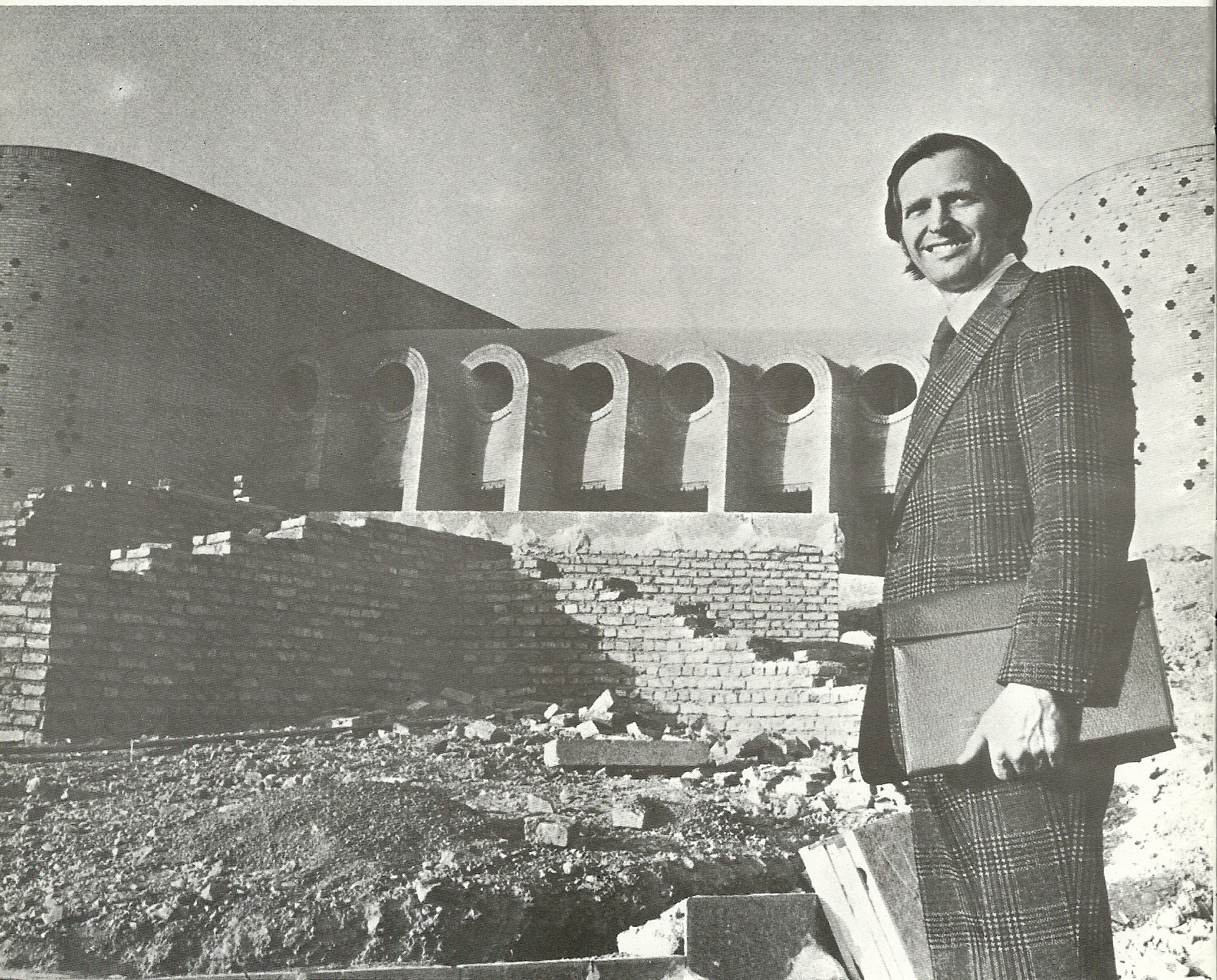
D. Ray Heisey, at the unfinished building for Damavand College (1975).

He taught for 8 years at Messiah College. As a professor at Kent State University, from 1966 until 1996, Heisey researched, taught and wrote about methods of communication and the differences between these in various cultures. Much of his research involved the role of rhetoric in cultural context. He also wrote and edited several books on this subject.

From Fall 1975 until 1978, Heisey served as the second president of Damavand College in Tehran, Iran. Heisey taught at Peking University in Beijing, China in 1996 and 2000. He was named visiting distinguished professor of rhetoric at Hiram College for 2008.

Heisey was presented with an outstanding paper award at the 1996 RIT Multiculturism, Cultural Diversity and Understanding Conference.

Heisey died May 20, 2011, of thyroid cancer in Cleveland, Ohio.

== Family ==
Heisey married Susanne (née VanValin) in 1959. He had three sons. He was a member of the Kent Presbyterian Church in Kent, Ohio starting in 1968.

== Books ==
- Heisey, D. Ray (2004). Healing Body and Soul, The Life and Times of Dr. W. O. Baker, (1827-1916). The Brethren in Christ Historical. LCCN 2004109936.
- D. Ray Heisey, ed. (2000). Chinese Perspectives in Rhetoric and Communication. Advances in Communication and Culture Series. Vol. 1. Stamford, CT: Ablex Publishing Corporation. ISBN 978-1-56750-495-8.
- Wenshan Jia, D. Ray Heisey and Randy Kluver, editors. Chinese Communication Research in the 20th and 21st Centuries: Advances, Challenges and Prospects. JAI Press, 2000.

== Articles ==
- "International Perspectives on Cultural Identity", Review of Communication, Volume 11, Issue 1, 2011
- Heisey, D. R. (2011). Reflections on A Persian Jewel: Damavand College, Tehran (PDF)
- The Visual and Artistic Rhetoric of Americans and Iranians of Each Other Impacted by Media, D. Ray Heisey and Mansoureh Sharifzadeh]. in Proceedings of the Phi Beta Cappa, Volume 2 Number 1. (PDF)
- "The Cross-Cultural Schemata of Iranian-American People Toward Each Other: A Qualitative Approach", Ehsan Shahghasemi and D. Ray Heisey. Intercultural Communications Studies, 2009, Volume XVIII Number 1
