= Damavand College =

School in Iran

- مدرسه عالی دماوند
- Former name: Damavand Higher Educational Institute
- Type: women's private (1968–1974); public (1974–1979)
- Active: 1968–1979
- Location: 13 Diba Alley, Tehran, Iran (from 1968 to 1976), Lashgark Road, Tehran, Iran (from 1976 to 1979)

Damavand College (Persian: مدرسه عالی دماوند; romanization: Madreseh-ye Ālī-ye Damāvand; and later, دانشکده دماوند Dāneshkadeh-ye Damāvand) was founded in 1968 as a private institution of higher learning for women and run by an international community and by American Presbyterian Missionaries. In 1974, it became a public college, offering a four-year intercultural program in liberal arts.

In 1976, the campus was designed by William Wesley Peters of Taliesin Associated Architects (Frank Lloyd Wright Foundation) and Nezam Amery of the Amery-Kamooneh-Khosrovi Group.

It was one of the last educational centers that closed down preceding the February 1979 events with the Islamic Iranian Revolution. The former campus of Damavand College is now occupied by Payame Noor University.

== History ==
Damavand College takes its name from Mount Damavand, which rises out of the Alborz Range north of the city of Tehran. A precursor to Damavand College was the Iran Bethel School, which was established in c. 1874 by the same American Presbyterian Missionaries, other schools by these Missionaries in Tehran include Sage College, and Alborz College (also known as the American College of Tehran).

The school was founded in 1968 as a private institution of higher learning for women and run by an international community and was located at 13 Diba Alley in Tehran. In 1974, it became a public college, offering a four-year intercultural program in liberal arts leading to the Bachelor of Arts and Master of Arts degrees.

The first class was consisting of 62 seniors graduated in 1972, while by 1978 the population increased to 162 graduates. In 1977–1978, the college had over 800 Iranian and international students. All classes at the school were taught in the English language, from the freshman year and on, except those classes on Iranian culture.

In 1976, the school's new campus construction was completed at Lashgark Road in Tehran, it was designed and built by William Wesley Peters of Taliesin Associated Architects (Frank Lloyd Wright Foundation) and Nezam Amery of the Amery-Kamooneh-Khosrovi Group.

It was one of the last educational centers that closed down preceding the February 1979 Islamic Iranian Revolution. The collection of the books are now available at Central Library and the Documentation Center of Allameh Tabatabai University. The former campus of Damavand College is now occupied by Payame Noor University.

== Presidents ==
From 1968 to 1979, Damavand College was served by three presidents, and Mary C. Thompson was the academic dean all through the years. Under the leadership of Frances M. Gray (1910–2001), Damavand College was established in 1968 and that same year was accredited. From the time of the founding of the college, Gray continued as president until her retirement in June 1975.

Professor D. Ray Heisey (1932–2011), was the second president, serving from Fall 1975 until 1978. In 1978 he return to his position as professor of Rhetoric and Communication at the Kent State University in Ohio.

Carolyn Spatta, a cultural geographer was the third and the last president of Damavand College that was taken over by the Iranian Government in 1979 when the Islamic Revolution replaced the Pahlavi dynasty. In 1995 with Susan Christine Seymour, she wrote Asian College Women's Aspirations: A Comparative Study of the Effects of Maternal employment in which Damavand College has been named as one of the nine colleges that joined Asian Women Institutes in 1971 and in 1975 the organization to share its concern about women's higher education in Asia.

Professor Mehdi Mohaghegh became the president of the college after the Iranian Revolution in February 1979. He was from Tehran University and one of the Professors of Persian Literature in the college. His presidency was short as with the formation of the Cultural Revolution in 1980, Damavand was amalgamated into what is now Allameh Tabatabai University and its existence came to an end.

== Asian Women Institute ==
In 1975, nine colleges of the Asian Women's Institute including Damavand College that had been founded as Christian Colleges, joined to share their concerns about women's higher education in Asia. Earlier than that in 1971 representatives of those colleges agreed to plan for a joint organization. They are all still active with the same goals except for Damavand College that was closed in 1979 prior to the Islamic Revolution of Iran.

== Gallery ==
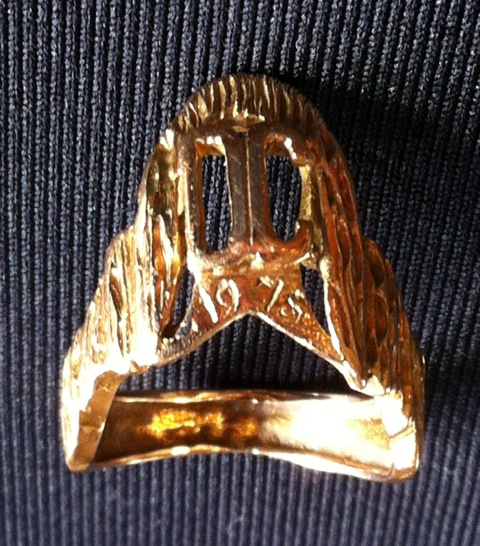
Damavand College class ring (1975)

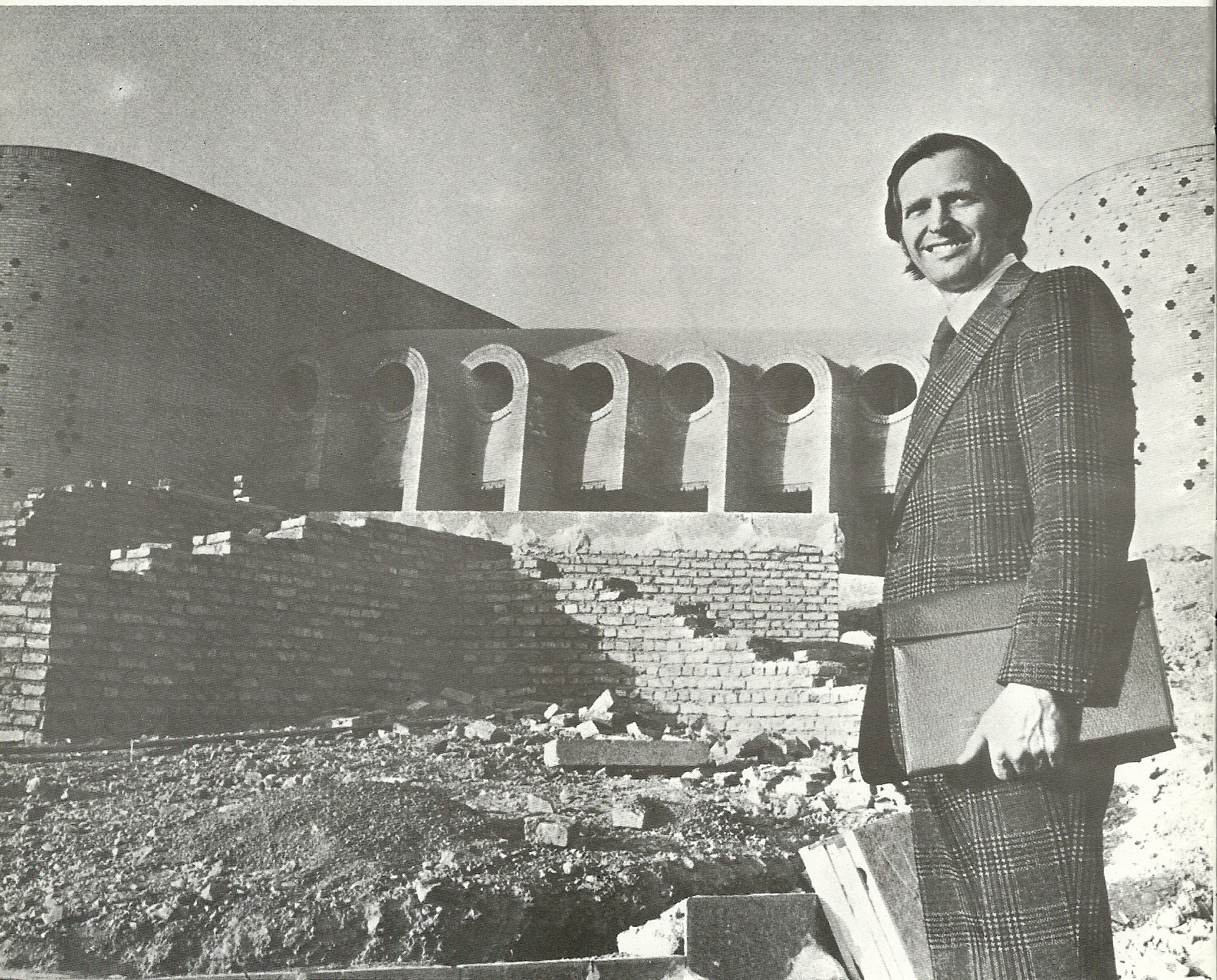
President D. Ray Heisey and the unfinished college building (1975)

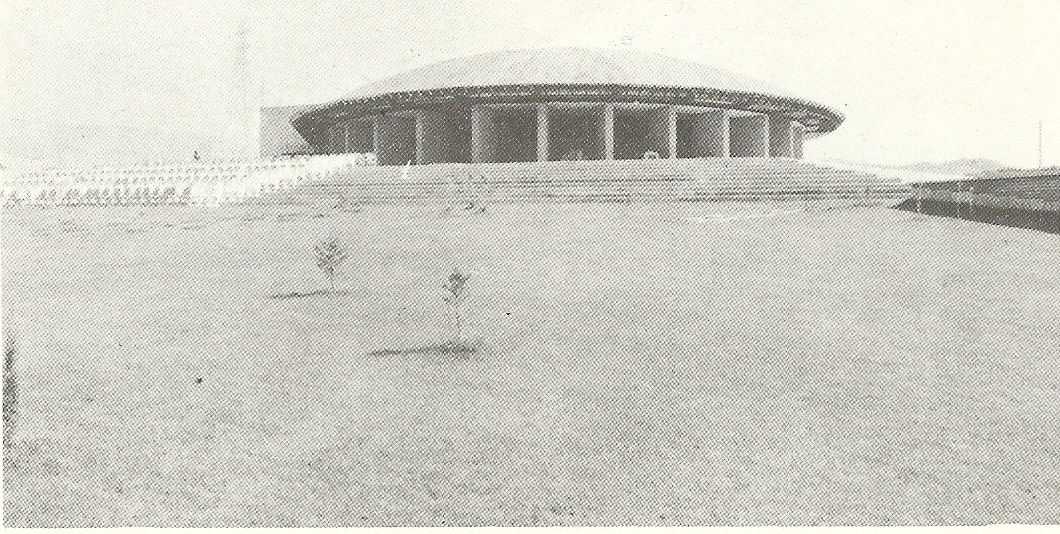
The unfinished library (1975)

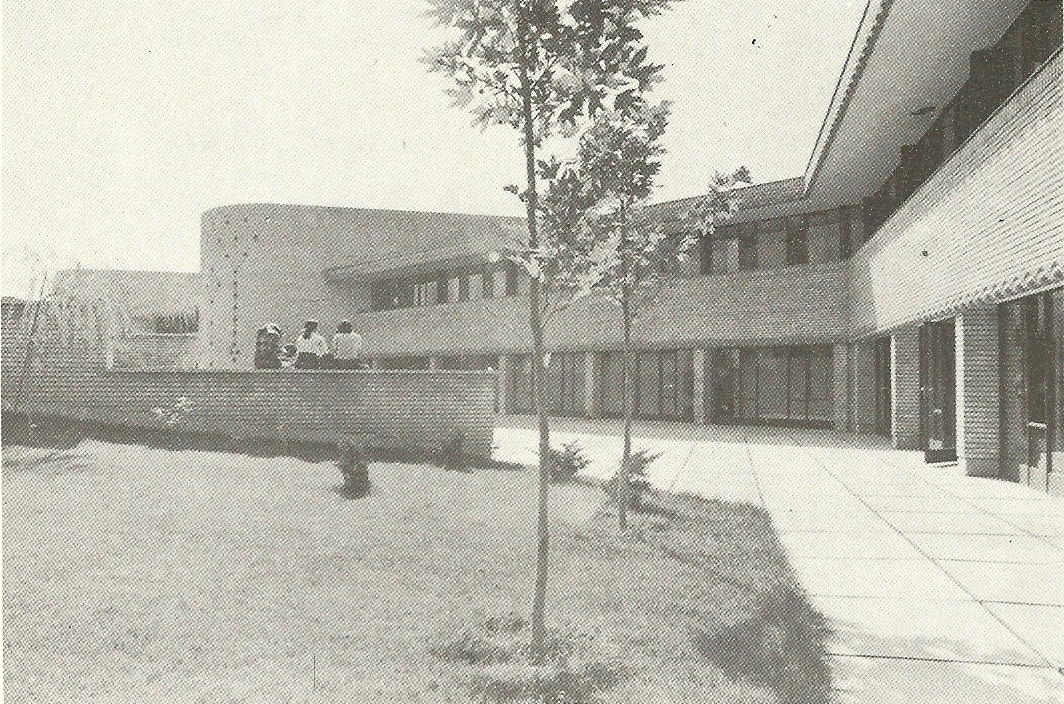
The courtyard (1977)

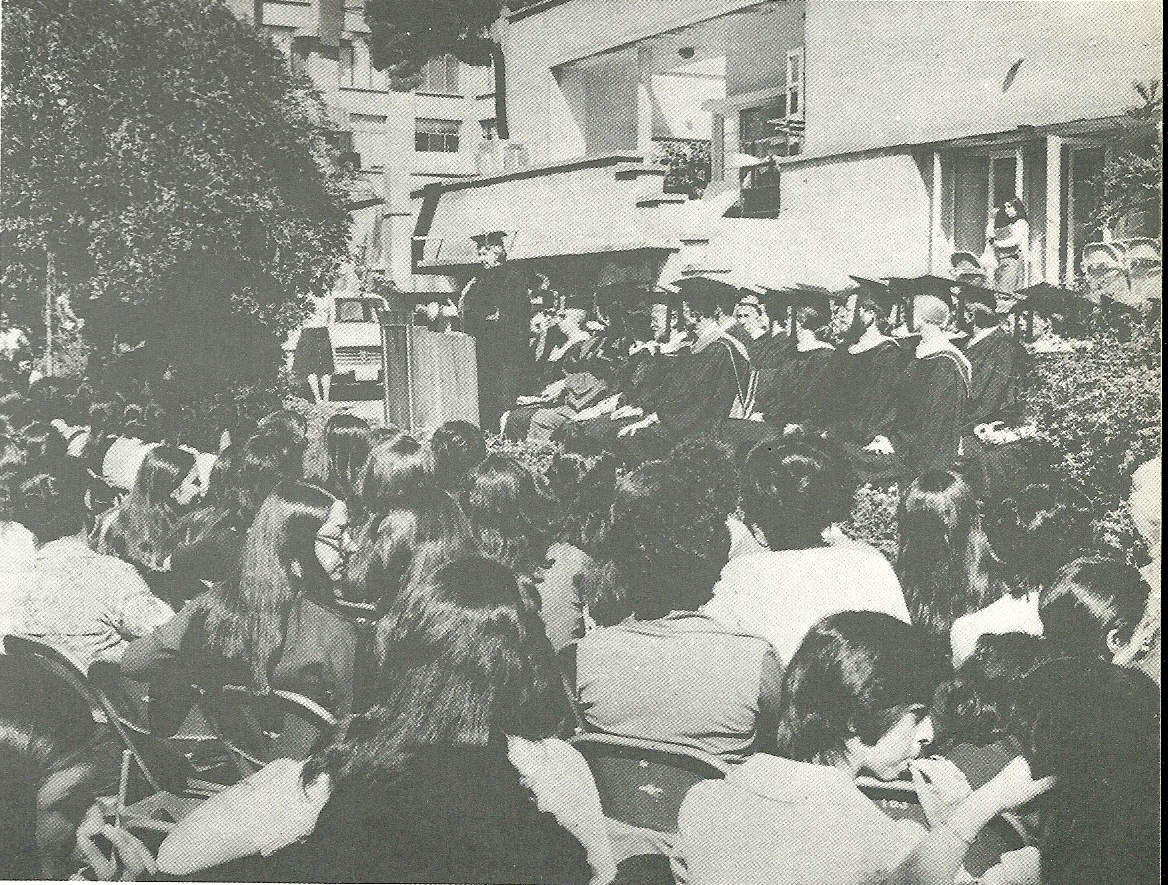
The 13 Diba Alley campus of Damavand College (1974)

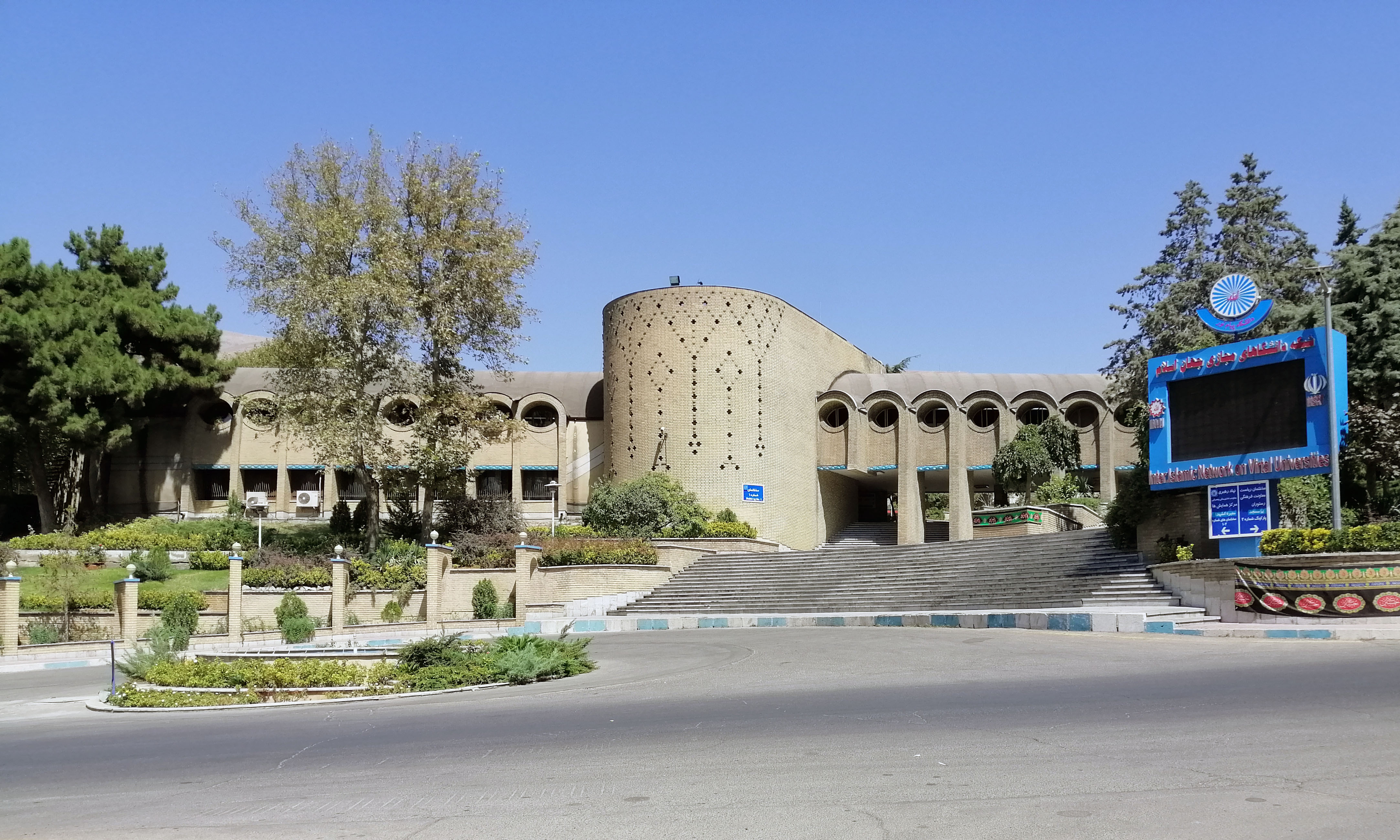
Main building (2021)
