= 1934 Howard Bulldogs football team =

American college football season

1934 Howard Bulldogs football
- Conference: Dixie Conference, Southern Intercollegiate Athletic Association
- Record: 3–4–2 (0–1 Dixie, 2–1–1 SIAA)
- Head coach: Clyde Propst (1st season)
- Home stadium: Legion Field

1934 Dixie Conference football standings
	Conf.					Overall
Team	W		L		T	W		L		T
Birmingham–Southern $	5	–	0	–	0	9	–	0	–	0
Chattanooga	3	–	0	–	1	4	–	3	–	1
Millsaps	2	–	1	–	1	7	–	1	–	2
Mississippi College	2	–	2	–	0	5	–	4	–	0
Centre	1	–	1	–	0	5	–	5	–	0
Southwestern (TN)	1	–	3	–	1	3	–	6	–	1
Howard (AL)	0	–	1	–	0	3	–	4	–	2
Mercer	0	–	2	–	1	3	–	6	–	1
Spring Hill	0	–	4	–	0	4	–	5	–	0
$ – Conference champion

1934 Southern Intercollegiate Athletic Association football standings
	Conf.					Overall
Team	W		L		T	W		L		T
Furman $	4	–	0	–	0	5	–	4	–	0
Union (KY)	4	–	0	–	1	5	–	0	–	2
Millsaps	4	–	0	–	2	7	–	1	–	2
Centenary	3	–	0	–	0	10	–	2	–	0
Rollins	3	–	0	–	0	5	–	3	–	0
Centre	4	–	1	–	0	5	–	5	–	0
Western Kentucky State Teachers	4	–	1	–	1	4	–	2	–	2
Loyola (LA)	3	–	1	–	0	4	–	5	–	0
The Citadel	3	–	1	–	0	3	–	5	–	1
Murray State	5	–	2	–	0	6	–	3	–	0
Miami (FL)	2	–	1	–	1	5	–	3	–	1
Mississippi College	4	–	2	–	0	5	–	4	–	0
Howard (AL)	2	–	1	–	1	3	–	4	–	2
Louisiana Normal	3	–	2	–	0	4	–	3	–	1
Presbyterian	3	–	2	–	1	3	–	4	–	2
Transylvania	3	–	3	–	0	3	–	5	–	0
Georgetown (KY)	2	–	2	–	1	2	–	6	–	1
Southwestern (TN)	1	–	1	–	1	3	–	6	–	1
SW Louisiana	2	–	3	–	0	4	–	5	–	0
Union (TN)	2	–	3	–	1	6	–	4	–	1
Wofford	2	–	3	–	1	4	–	4	–	1
Mississippi State Teachers	2	–	3	–	1	3	–	4	–	2
Louisville	2	–	3	–	0	2	–	5	–	0
Louisiana College	2	–	4	–	1	3	–	4	–	1
Middle Tennessee State Teachers	1	–	3	–	0	2	–	7	–	0
Mercer	1	–	4	–	0	3	–	6	–	1
Newberry	1	–	4	–	0	4	–	7	–	0
Tennessee Tech	1	–	4	–	0	3	–	5	–	1
Eastern Kentucky State Teachers	1	–	5	–	0	1	–	6	–	0
Stetson	0	–	2	–	1	2	–	4	–	1
Morehead State	0	–	4	–	0	2	–	4	–	0
Erskine	0	–	4	–	0	1	–	8	–	0
Louisiana Tech	0	–	5	–	0	4	–	6	–	0
$ – Conference champion

The 1934 Howard Bulldogs football team was an American football team that represented Howard College—now known as Samford University—as a member of the Dixie Conference and the Southern Intercollegiate Athletic Association (SIAA) in the 1934 college football season. Led by Clyde Propst in his first and only season as head coach, the team compiled an overall record of 3–4–2 and with a mark of 0–1 in Dixie Conference play and 2–1–1 against SIAA competition.

== Schedule ==
Date	Opponent	Site	Result	Attendance	Source
September 21	Mississippi State*	Legion Field; Birmingham, AL	L 7–13		
September 29	at Alabama*	Denny Stadium; Tuscaloosa, AL	L 0–24	6,000	
October 6	Presbyterian	Legion Field; Birmingham, AL	W 42–19		
October 12	at Loyola (LA)	Loyola University Stadium; New Orleans, LA	L 7–13		
October 20	at Ole Miss*	Hemingway Stadium; Oxford, MS	W 7–6		
October 27	at Oglethorpe*	Hermance Stadium; North Atlanta, GA	T 0–0		
November 3	at Western Kentucky State	Bowling Green, KY	T 0–0	4,000	
November 10	at Tennessee Tech	Cookeville, TN	W 26–0		
November 24	vs. Birmingham–Southern	Legion Field; Birmingham, AL	L 0–12	13,512	
*Non-conference game
