= 1934 Loyola Wolf Pack football team =

American college football season

1934 Loyola Wolf Pack football
- Conference: Southern Intercollegiate Athletic Association
- Record: 4–5 (3–1 SIAA)
- Head coach: Robert Erskine (2nd season)
- Home stadium: Loyola University Stadium

1934 Southern Intercollegiate Athletic Association football standings
	Conf.					Overall
Team	W		L		T	W		L		T
Furman $	4	–	0	–	0	5	–	4	–	0
Union (KY)	4	–	0	–	1	5	–	0	–	2
Millsaps	4	–	0	–	2	7	–	1	–	2
Centenary	3	–	0	–	0	10	–	2	–	0
Rollins	3	–	0	–	0	5	–	3	–	0
Centre	4	–	1	–	0	5	–	5	–	0
Western Kentucky State Teachers	4	–	1	–	1	4	–	2	–	2
Loyola (LA)	3	–	1	–	0	4	–	5	–	0
The Citadel	3	–	1	–	0	3	–	5	–	1
Murray State	5	–	2	–	0	6	–	3	–	0
Miami (FL)	2	–	1	–	1	5	–	3	–	1
Mississippi College	4	–	2	–	0	5	–	4	–	0
Howard (AL)	2	–	1	–	1	3	–	4	–	2
Louisiana Normal	3	–	2	–	0	4	–	3	–	1
Presbyterian	3	–	2	–	1	3	–	4	–	2
Transylvania	3	–	3	–	0	3	–	5	–	0
Georgetown (KY)	2	–	2	–	1	2	–	6	–	1
Southwestern (TN)	1	–	1	–	1	3	–	6	–	1
SW Louisiana	2	–	3	–	0	4	–	5	–	0
Union (TN)	2	–	3	–	1	6	–	4	–	1
Wofford	2	–	3	–	1	4	–	4	–	1
Mississippi State Teachers	2	–	3	–	1	3	–	4	–	2
Louisville	2	–	3	–	0	2	–	5	–	0
Louisiana College	2	–	4	–	1	3	–	4	–	1
Middle Tennessee State Teachers	1	–	3	–	0	2	–	7	–	0
Mercer	1	–	4	–	0	3	–	6	–	1
Newberry	1	–	4	–	0	4	–	7	–	0
Tennessee Tech	1	–	4	–	0	3	–	5	–	1
Eastern Kentucky State Teachers	1	–	5	–	0	1	–	6	–	0
Stetson	0	–	2	–	1	2	–	4	–	1
Morehead State	0	–	4	–	0	2	–	4	–	0
Erskine	0	–	4	–	0	1	–	8	–	0
Louisiana Tech	0	–	5	–	0	4	–	6	–	0
$ – Conference champion

The 1934 Loyola Wolf Pack football team was an American football team that represented Loyola College of New Orleans (now known as Loyola University New Orleans) as a member of the Southern Intercollegiate Athletic Association (SIAA) during the 1934 college football season. In its second season under head coach Robert Erskine, the team compiled a 4–5 record and was outscored by a total of 89 to 81. The team played its home games at Loyola University Stadium in New Orleans.

== Schedule ==
Date	Opponent	Site	Result	Attendance	Source
September 22	Rice*	Loyola Stadium; New Orleans, LA	L 0–12	8,000	
September 28	at Birmingham–Southern*	Legion Field; Birmingham, AL	L 2–19		
October 5	Mercer	Loyola Stadium; New Orleans, LA	W 21–0	3,500	
October 12	Howard (AL)	Loyola Stadium; New Orleans, LA	W 13–7		
October 19	Mississippi College	Loyola Stadium; New Orleans, LA	W 20–7		
October 27	Spring Hill*	Loyola Stadium; New Orleans, LA	W 13–0		
November 10	TCU*	Loyola Stadium; New Orleans, LA	L 0–7		
November 17	Mississippi State*	Loyola Stadium; New Orleans, LA	L 6–20		
November 29	Centenary	Loyola Stadium; New Orleans, LA	L 6–17		
*Non-conference game
