= 1934 Mississippi College Choctaws football team =

American college football season

1934 Mississippi College Choctaws football
- Conference: Dixie Conference, Southern Intercollegiate Athletic Association
- Record: 5–4 (2–2 Dixie, 4–2 SIAA)
- Head coach: Stanley L. Robinson (10th season)
- Home stadium: Provine Field

1934 Dixie Conference football standings
	Conf.					Overall
Team	W		L		T	W		L		T
Birmingham–Southern $	5	–	0	–	0	9	–	0	–	0
Chattanooga	3	–	0	–	1	4	–	3	–	1
Millsaps	2	–	1	–	1	7	–	1	–	2
Mississippi College	2	–	2	–	0	5	–	4	–	0
Centre	1	–	1	–	0	5	–	5	–	0
Southwestern (TN)	1	–	3	–	1	3	–	6	–	1
Howard (AL)	0	–	1	–	0	3	–	4	–	2
Mercer	0	–	2	–	1	3	–	6	–	1
Spring Hill	0	–	4	–	0	4	–	5	–	0
$ – Conference champion

1934 Southern Intercollegiate Athletic Association football standings
	Conf.					Overall
Team	W		L		T	W		L		T
Furman $	4	–	0	–	0	5	–	4	–	0
Union (KY)	4	–	0	–	1	5	–	0	–	2
Millsaps	4	–	0	–	2	7	–	1	–	2
Centenary	3	–	0	–	0	10	–	2	–	0
Rollins	3	–	0	–	0	5	–	3	–	0
Centre	4	–	1	–	0	5	–	5	–	0
Western Kentucky State Teachers	4	–	1	–	1	4	–	2	–	2
Loyola (LA)	3	–	1	–	0	4	–	5	–	0
The Citadel	3	–	1	–	0	3	–	5	–	1
Murray State	5	–	2	–	0	6	–	3	–	0
Miami (FL)	2	–	1	–	1	5	–	3	–	1
Mississippi College	4	–	2	–	0	5	–	4	–	0
Howard (AL)	2	–	1	–	1	3	–	4	–	2
Louisiana Normal	3	–	2	–	0	4	–	3	–	1
Presbyterian	3	–	2	–	1	3	–	4	–	2
Transylvania	3	–	3	–	0	3	–	5	–	0
Georgetown (KY)	2	–	2	–	1	2	–	6	–	1
Southwestern (TN)	1	–	1	–	1	3	–	6	–	1
SW Louisiana	2	–	3	–	0	4	–	5	–	0
Union (TN)	2	–	3	–	1	6	–	4	–	1
Wofford	2	–	3	–	1	4	–	4	–	1
Mississippi State Teachers	2	–	3	–	1	3	–	4	–	2
Louisville	2	–	3	–	0	2	–	5	–	0
Louisiana College	2	–	4	–	1	3	–	4	–	1
Middle Tennessee State Teachers	1	–	3	–	0	2	–	7	–	0
Mercer	1	–	4	–	0	3	–	6	–	1
Newberry	1	–	4	–	0	4	–	7	–	0
Tennessee Tech	1	–	4	–	0	3	–	5	–	1
Eastern Kentucky State Teachers	1	–	5	–	0	1	–	6	–	0
Stetson	0	–	2	–	1	2	–	4	–	1
Morehead State	0	–	4	–	0	2	–	4	–	0
Erskine	0	–	4	–	0	1	–	8	–	0
Louisiana Tech	0	–	5	–	0	4	–	6	–	0
$ – Conference champion

The 1934 Mississippi College Choctaws football team was an American football team that represented Mississippi College as a member of the Dixie Conference and the Southern Intercollegiate Athletic Association (SIAA) in the 1934 college football season. Led by Stanley L. Robinson in his tenth season as head coach, the team compiled an overall record of 5–4 and with a mark of 2–2 in Dixie Conference play and 4–2 against SIAA competition.

== Schedule ==
Date	Opponent	Site	Result	Attendance	Source
September 28	at Spring Hill	Mobile, AL	W 7–0		
October 6	Mississippi State Teachers	Provine Field; Clinton, MS	W 12–0		
October 13	vs. Southwestern (TN)	State Fairgrounds; Jackson, MS	W 20–7	4,000	
October 19	at Loyola (LA)	Loyola Stadium; New Orleans, LA	L 7–20		
October 26	at Mississippi State*	Scott Field; Starkville, MS	L 6–13		
November 3	Chattanooga	Municipal Stadium; Jackson, MS	L 0–13		
November 10	Louisiana Tech	Vicksburg Fairgrounds; Vicksburg, MS	W 32–0		
November 17	at Louisiana College	Alumni Field; Pineville, LA	W 19–13		
November 29	vs. Millsaps	Municipal Stadium; Jackson, MS (rivalry)	L 0–13		
*Non-conference game
