= 1934 Centenary Gentlemen football team =

American college football season

1934 Centenary Gentlemen football
- Conference: Southern Intercollegiate Athletic Association
- Record: 10–2 (3–0 SIAA)
- Head coach: Curtis Parker (1st season)
- Captain: Buddy Parker

1934 Southern Intercollegiate Athletic Association football standings
	Conf.					Overall
Team	W		L		T	W		L		T
Furman $	4	–	0	–	0	5	–	4	–	0
Union (KY)	4	–	0	–	1	5	–	0	–	2
Millsaps	4	–	0	–	2	7	–	1	–	2
Centenary	3	–	0	–	0	10	–	2	–	0
Rollins	3	–	0	–	0	5	–	3	–	0
Centre	4	–	1	–	0	5	–	5	–	0
Western Kentucky State Teachers	4	–	1	–	1	4	–	2	–	2
Loyola (LA)	3	–	1	–	0	4	–	5	–	0
The Citadel	3	–	1	–	0	3	–	5	–	1
Murray State	5	–	2	–	0	6	–	3	–	0
Miami (FL)	2	–	1	–	1	5	–	3	–	1
Mississippi College	4	–	2	–	0	5	–	4	–	0
Howard (AL)	2	–	1	–	1	3	–	4	–	2
Louisiana Normal	3	–	2	–	0	4	–	3	–	1
Presbyterian	3	–	2	–	1	3	–	4	–	2
Transylvania	3	–	3	–	0	3	–	5	–	0
Georgetown (KY)	2	–	2	–	1	2	–	6	–	1
Southwestern (TN)	1	–	1	–	1	3	–	6	–	1
SW Louisiana	2	–	3	–	0	4	–	5	–	0
Union (TN)	2	–	3	–	1	6	–	4	–	1
Wofford	2	–	3	–	1	4	–	4	–	1
Mississippi State Teachers	2	–	3	–	1	3	–	4	–	2
Louisville	2	–	3	–	0	2	–	5	–	0
Louisiana College	2	–	4	–	1	3	–	4	–	1
Middle Tennessee State Teachers	1	–	3	–	0	2	–	7	–	0
Mercer	1	–	4	–	0	3	–	6	–	1
Newberry	1	–	4	–	0	4	–	7	–	0
Tennessee Tech	1	–	4	–	0	3	–	5	–	1
Eastern Kentucky State Teachers	1	–	5	–	0	1	–	6	–	0
Stetson	0	–	2	–	1	2	–	4	–	1
Morehead State	0	–	4	–	0	2	–	4	–	0
Erskine	0	–	4	–	0	1	–	8	–	0
Louisiana Tech	0	–	5	–	0	4	–	6	–	0
$ – Conference champion

The 1934 Centenary Gentlemen football team represented the Centenary College of Louisiana during the 1934 college football season. The team was led by first-year head coach Curtis Parker and competed in the Southern Intercollegiate Athletic Association (SIAA).

== Schedule ==
Date	Time	Opponent	Site	Result	Attendance	Source
September 19		at Louisiana College	Alumni Field; Pineville, LA	W 13–0	6,000	
September 22	3:00 p.m.	Louisiana Normal	Centenary Stadium; Shreveport, LA	W 16–0	5,000	
September 29		Hendrix*	Centenary Stadium; Shreveport, LA	W 28–0		
October 6		at Oklahoma*	Memorial Stadium; Norman, OK	L 0–7	12,000	
October 13		vs. Texas A&M*	Purple Stadium; Beaumont, TX	W 13–0	2,000	
October 20		at Texas*	War Memorial Stadium; Austin, TX	W 9–6	10,000	
October 27		TCU*	Louisiana State Fairgrounds; Shreveport, LA	W 13–0	8,000	
November 3		Ouachita Baptist*	Centenary Stadium; Shreveport, LA	W 8–0		
November 10		at Tulsa*	Skelly Field; Tulsa, OK	L 8–14	15,000	
November 17		Baylor*	Centenary Stadium; Shreveport, LA	W 7–0		
November 24		Ole Miss*	Centenary Stadium; Shreveport, LA	W 13–6	7,500	
November 29		Loyola (LA)*	Loyola University Stadium; New Orleans, LA	W 17–6		
*Non-conference game; All times are in Central time
