= 1934 Spring Hill Badgers football team =

American college football season

1934 Spring Hill Badgers football
- Conference: Dixie Conference
- Record: 4–5 (0–4 Dixie)
- Head coach: Mike Donahue (1st season)

1934 Dixie Conference football standings
	Conf.					Overall
Team	W		L		T	W		L		T
Birmingham–Southern $	5	–	0	–	0	9	–	0	–	0
Chattanooga	3	–	0	–	1	4	–	3	–	1
Millsaps	2	–	1	–	1	7	–	1	–	2
Mississippi College	2	–	2	–	0	5	–	4	–	0
Centre	1	–	1	–	0	5	–	5	–	0
Southwestern (TN)	1	–	3	–	1	3	–	6	–	1
Howard (AL)	0	–	1	–	0	3	–	4	–	2
Mercer	0	–	2	–	1	3	–	6	–	1
Spring Hill	0	–	4	–	0	4	–	5	–	0
$ – Conference champion

The 1934 Spring Hill Badgers football team was an American football team that represented Spring Hill College as a member of the Dixie Conference during the 1934 college football season. In Mike Donahue's first and only season as head coach, the team compiled a record of 4–5 overall with a mark of 0–4 in conference play, placing last out of nine teams in the Dixie Conference.

== Schedule ==
Date	Opponent	Site	Result	Source
September 22	Troy State*	Mobile, AL	W 8–0	
September 29	Mississippi College	Mobile, AL	L 0–7	
October 5	at Southwestern Louisiana*	Campus Athletic Field; Lafayette, LA	W 7–6	
October 19	at Union (TN)*	Rothrock Field; Jackson, TN	W 8–6	
October 27	at Loyola (LA)*	Loyola Stadium; New Orleans, LA	L 0–13	
November 2	at Mississippi State Teachers*	Faulkner Field; Hattiesburg, MS	W 7–0	
November 9	at Millsaps	Alumni Field; Jackson, MS	L 7–9	
November 17	Birmingham–Southern	Mobile, AL	L 0–14	
November 29	Southwestern (TN)	Hartwell Field; Mobile, AL	L 6–7	
*Non-conference game
