= 1934 Mercer Bears football team =

American college football season

1934 Mercer Bears football
- Conference: Dixie Conference, Southern Intercollegiate Athletic Association
- Record: 3–6–1 (0–2–1 Dixie, 1–4 SIAA)
- Head coach: Lake Russell (6th season)
- Home stadium: Centennial Stadium

1934 Dixie Conference football standings
	Conf.					Overall
Team	W		L		T	W		L		T
Birmingham–Southern $	5	–	0	–	0	9	–	0	–	0
Chattanooga	3	–	0	–	1	4	–	3	–	1
Millsaps	2	–	1	–	1	7	–	1	–	2
Mississippi College	2	–	2	–	0	5	–	4	–	0
Centre	1	–	1	–	0	5	–	5	–	0
Southwestern (TN)	1	–	3	–	1	3	–	6	–	1
Howard (AL)	0	–	1	–	0	3	–	4	–	2
Mercer	0	–	2	–	1	3	–	6	–	1
Spring Hill	0	–	4	–	0	4	–	5	–	0
$ – Conference champion

1934 Southern Intercollegiate Athletic Association football standings
	Conf.					Overall
Team	W		L		T	W		L		T
Furman $	4	–	0	–	0	5	–	4	–	0
Union (KY)	4	–	0	–	1	5	–	0	–	2
Millsaps	4	–	0	–	2	7	–	1	–	2
Centenary	3	–	0	–	0	10	–	2	–	0
Rollins	3	–	0	–	0	5	–	3	–	0
Centre	4	–	1	–	0	5	–	5	–	0
Western Kentucky State Teachers	4	–	1	–	1	4	–	2	–	2
Loyola (LA)	3	–	1	–	0	4	–	5	–	0
The Citadel	3	–	1	–	0	3	–	5	–	1
Murray State	5	–	2	–	0	6	–	3	–	0
Miami (FL)	2	–	1	–	1	5	–	3	–	1
Mississippi College	4	–	2	–	0	5	–	4	–	0
Howard (AL)	2	–	1	–	1	3	–	4	–	2
Louisiana Normal	3	–	2	–	0	4	–	3	–	1
Presbyterian	3	–	2	–	1	3	–	4	–	2
Transylvania	3	–	3	–	0	3	–	5	–	0
Georgetown (KY)	2	–	2	–	1	2	–	6	–	1
Southwestern (TN)	1	–	1	–	1	3	–	6	–	1
SW Louisiana	2	–	3	–	0	4	–	5	–	0
Union (TN)	2	–	3	–	1	6	–	4	–	1
Wofford	2	–	3	–	1	4	–	4	–	1
Mississippi State Teachers	2	–	3	–	1	3	–	4	–	2
Louisville	2	–	3	–	0	2	–	5	–	0
Louisiana College	2	–	4	–	1	3	–	4	–	1
Middle Tennessee State Teachers	1	–	3	–	0	2	–	7	–	0
Mercer	1	–	4	–	0	3	–	6	–	1
Newberry	1	–	4	–	0	4	–	7	–	0
Tennessee Tech	1	–	4	–	0	3	–	5	–	1
Eastern Kentucky State Teachers	1	–	5	–	0	1	–	6	–	0
Stetson	0	–	2	–	1	2	–	4	–	1
Morehead State	0	–	4	–	0	2	–	4	–	0
Erskine	0	–	4	–	0	1	–	8	–	0
Louisiana Tech	0	–	5	–	0	4	–	6	–	0
$ – Conference champion

The 1934 Mercer Bears football team was an American football that represented Mercer University as a member of the Dixie Conference and the Southern Intercollegiate Athletic Association (SIAA) in the 1934 college football season. Led by Lake Russell in his sixth season as head coach, the team comped an overall record of 3–6–1 and with a mark of 0–2–1 in Dixie Conference play and 1–4 against SIAA competition.

== Schedule ==
Date	Time	Opponent	Site	Result	Attendance	Source
September 29		Presbyterian	Centennial Stadium; Macon, GA	L 6–7		
October 5		at Loyola (LA)	Loyola University Stadium; New Orleans, LA	L 0–21		
October 13		at Birmingham–Southern	Legion Field; Birmingham, AL	L 0–14		
October 20		Furman	Centennial Stadium; Macon, GA	L 3–9		
October 27		vs. Stetson	Fairfield Stadium; Jacksonville, FL	W 6–0		
November 2		Washington & Jefferson*	Centennial Stadium; Macon, GA	W 30–7		
November 10		at Chattanooga	Chamberlain Field; Chattanooga, TN	T 13–13		
November 17		vs. Clemson*	Municipal Stadium; Savannah, GA	L 0–32		
November 24	3:00 p.m.	at Centre	Farris Stadium; Danville, KY	L 13–16	4,500–5,000	
November 29		at Oglethorpe*	Hermance Stadium; North Atlanta, GA	W 7–6	2,500	
*Non-conference game; All times are in Eastern time
