= 1934 Chattanooga Moccasins football team =

American college football season

1934 Chattanooga Moccasins football
- Conference: Dixie Conference
- Record: 4–3–1 (3–0–1 Dixie)
- Head coach: Scrappy Moore (4th season)
- Captain: Fred Perry
- Home stadium: Chamberlain Field

1934 Dixie Conference football standings
	Conf.					Overall
Team	W		L		T	W		L		T
Birmingham–Southern $	5	–	0	–	0	9	–	0	–	0
Chattanooga	3	–	0	–	1	4	–	3	–	1
Millsaps	2	–	1	–	1	7	–	1	–	2
Mississippi College	2	–	2	–	0	5	–	4	–	0
Centre	1	–	1	–	0	5	–	5	–	0
Southwestern (TN)	1	–	3	–	1	3	–	6	–	1
Howard (AL)	0	–	1	–	0	3	–	4	–	2
Mercer	0	–	2	–	1	3	–	6	–	1
Spring Hill	0	–	4	–	0	4	–	5	–	0
$ – Conference champion

The 1934 Chattanooga Moccasins football team was an American football team that represented the University of Chattanooga—now known as the University of Tennessee at Chattanooga—as a member of the Dixie Conference during the 1934 college football season. In Scrappy Moore's fourth season as head coach, the team compiled a record of 4–3–1 overall with a mark of 3–0–1 in conference play, placing second. The Moccasins played their home game at Chamberlain Field in Chattanooga, Tennessee.

== Schedule ==
Date	Opponent	Site	Result	Source
September 29	at Tulane*	Tulane Stadium; New Orleans, LA	L 0–41	
October 6	Middle Tennessee State Teachers*	Chamberlain Field; Chattanooga, TN	W 9–0	
October 13	Oglethorpe*	Chamberlain Field; Chattanooga, TN	L 0–18	
October 27	Southwestern (TN)	Chamberlain Field; Chattanooga, TN	W 20–7	
November 3	at Mississippi College	Municipal Stadium; Jackson, MS	W 13–0	
November 10	Mercer^{†}	Chamberlain Field; Chattanooga, TN	T 13–13	
November 17	vs. Emory and Henry*	Roosevelt Field; Johnson City, TN	L 0–12	
November 29	Centre	Chamberlain Field; Chattanooga, TN	W 7–0	
*Non-conference game; ^{†}Homecoming
