= 1934 Centre Colonels football team =

American college football season

1934 Centre Colonels football
- Conference: Dixie Conference, Southern Intercollegiate Athletic Association
- Record: 5–5 (1–1 Dixie, 4–1 SIAA)
- Head coach: Ed Kubale (6th season)
- Home stadium: Farris Stadium

1934 Dixie Conference football standings
	Conf.					Overall
Team	W		L		T	W		L		T
Birmingham–Southern $	5	–	0	–	0	9	–	0	–	0
Chattanooga	3	–	0	–	1	4	–	3	–	1
Millsaps	2	–	1	–	1	7	–	1	–	2
Mississippi College	2	–	2	–	0	5	–	4	–	0
Centre	1	–	1	–	0	5	–	5	–	0
Southwestern (TN)	1	–	3	–	1	3	–	6	–	1
Howard (AL)	0	–	1	–	0	3	–	4	–	2
Mercer	0	–	2	–	1	3	–	6	–	1
Spring Hill	0	–	4	–	0	4	–	5	–	0
$ – Conference champion

1934 Southern Intercollegiate Athletic Association football standings
	Conf.					Overall
Team	W		L		T	W		L		T
Furman $	4	–	0	–	0	5	–	4	–	0
Union (KY)	4	–	0	–	1	5	–	0	–	2
Millsaps	4	–	0	–	2	7	–	1	–	2
Centenary	3	–	0	–	0	10	–	2	–	0
Rollins	3	–	0	–	0	5	–	3	–	0
Centre	4	–	1	–	0	5	–	5	–	0
Western Kentucky State Teachers	4	–	1	–	1	4	–	2	–	2
Loyola (LA)	3	–	1	–	0	4	–	5	–	0
The Citadel	3	–	1	–	0	3	–	5	–	1
Murray State	5	–	2	–	0	6	–	3	–	0
Miami (FL)	2	–	1	–	1	5	–	3	–	1
Mississippi College	4	–	2	–	0	5	–	4	–	0
Howard (AL)	2	–	1	–	1	3	–	4	–	2
Louisiana Normal	3	–	2	–	0	4	–	3	–	1
Presbyterian	3	–	2	–	1	3	–	4	–	2
Transylvania	3	–	3	–	0	3	–	5	–	0
Georgetown (KY)	2	–	2	–	1	2	–	6	–	1
Southwestern (TN)	1	–	1	–	1	3	–	6	–	1
SW Louisiana	2	–	3	–	0	4	–	5	–	0
Union (TN)	2	–	3	–	1	6	–	4	–	1
Wofford	2	–	3	–	1	4	–	4	–	1
Mississippi State Teachers	2	–	3	–	1	3	–	4	–	2
Louisville	2	–	3	–	0	2	–	5	–	0
Louisiana College	2	–	4	–	1	3	–	4	–	1
Middle Tennessee State Teachers	1	–	3	–	0	2	–	7	–	0
Mercer	1	–	4	–	0	3	–	6	–	1
Newberry	1	–	4	–	0	4	–	7	–	0
Tennessee Tech	1	–	4	–	0	3	–	5	–	1
Eastern Kentucky State Teachers	1	–	5	–	0	1	–	6	–	0
Stetson	0	–	2	–	1	2	–	4	–	1
Morehead State	0	–	4	–	0	2	–	4	–	0
Erskine	0	–	4	–	0	1	–	8	–	0
Louisiana Tech	0	–	5	–	0	4	–	6	–	0
$ – Conference champion

The 1934 Centre Colonels football team was an American football team that represented Centre College as a member of the Dixie Conference and the Southern Intercollegiate Athletic Association (SIAA) in the 1934 college football season. Led by Ed Kubale in his sixth season as head coach, the team compiled an overall record of 5–5 and with a mark of 1–1 in Dixie Conference play and 4–1 against SIAA competition.

== Schedule ==
Date	Time	Opponent	Site	Result	Attendance	Source
September 29	2:30 p.m.	at Tennessee*	Shields–Watkins Field; Knoxville, TN	L 0–32	7,500	
October 6	2:30 p.m.	Morehead State	Farris Stadium; Danville, KY	W 47–0		
October 12	7:15 p.m.	at Xavier*	Corcoran Field; Cincinnati, OH	W 7–6	5,500–7,000	
October 20		at Marquette*	Marquette Stadium; Milwaukee, WI	L 6–19	12,000	
October 27	2:00 p.m.	at Furman	Manly Field; Greenville, SC	L 6–7	3,000	
November 3	2:00 p.m.	at Louisville	Parkway Field; Louisville, KY	W 46–0	2,500	
November 12	1:00 p.m.	at Boston College*	Alumni Field; Chestnut Hill, MA	L 0–7	12,000–20,000	
November 17	2:00 p.m.	Georgetown (KY)	Farris Stadium; Danville, KY	W 36–0		
November 24	2:00 p.m.	Mercer^{†}	Farris Stadium; Danville, KY	W 16–13	4,500–5,000	
November 29	2:00 p.m.	at Chattanooga	Chamberlain Field; Chattanooga, TN	L 0–7	4,000	
*Non-conference game; ^{†}Homecoming; All times are in Central time
