= 1934 Murray State Thoroughbreds football team =

American college football season

1934 Murray State Thoroughbreds football
- Conference: Southern Intercollegiate Athletic Association
- Record: 6–3 (5–2 SIAA)
- Head coach: Roy Stewart (3rd season)
- Home stadium: College Stadium

1934 Southern Intercollegiate Athletic Association football standings
| | Conf. | | | | | Overall |
| Team | W | | L | | T | W | | L | | T |
|---|---|---|---|---|---|---|---|---|---|---|
| Furman $ | 4 | – | 0 | – | 0 | 5 | – | 4 | – | 0 |
| Union (KY) | 4 | – | 0 | – | 1 | 5 | – | 0 | – | 2 |
| Millsaps | 4 | – | 0 | – | 2 | 7 | – | 1 | – | 2 |
| Centenary | 3 | – | 0 | – | 0 | 10 | – | 2 | – | 0 |
| Rollins | 3 | – | 0 | – | 0 | 5 | – | 3 | – | 0 |
| Centre | 4 | – | 1 | – | 0 | 5 | – | 5 | – | 0 |
| Western Kentucky State Teachers | 4 | – | 1 | – | 1 | 4 | – | 2 | – | 2 |
| Loyola (LA) | 3 | – | 1 | – | 0 | 4 | – | 5 | – | 0 |
| The Citadel | 3 | – | 1 | – | 0 | 3 | – | 5 | – | 1 |
| Murray State | 5 | – | 2 | – | 0 | 6 | – | 3 | – | 0 |
| Miami (FL) | 2 | – | 1 | – | 1 | 5 | – | 3 | – | 1 |
| Mississippi College | 4 | – | 2 | – | 0 | 5 | – | 4 | – | 0 |
| Howard (AL) | 2 | – | 1 | – | 1 | 3 | – | 4 | – | 2 |
| Louisiana Normal | 3 | – | 2 | – | 0 | 4 | – | 3 | – | 1 |
| Presbyterian | 3 | – | 2 | – | 1 | 3 | – | 4 | – | 2 |
| Transylvania | 3 | – | 3 | – | 0 | 3 | – | 5 | – | 0 |
| Georgetown (KY) | 2 | – | 2 | – | 1 | 2 | – | 6 | – | 1 |
| Southwestern (TN) | 1 | – | 1 | – | 1 | 3 | – | 6 | – | 1 |
| SW Louisiana | 2 | – | 3 | – | 0 | 4 | – | 5 | – | 0 |
| Union (TN) | 2 | – | 3 | – | 1 | 6 | – | 4 | – | 1 |
| Wofford | 2 | – | 3 | – | 1 | 4 | – | 4 | – | 1 |
| Mississippi State Teachers | 2 | – | 3 | – | 1 | 3 | – | 4 | – | 2 |
| Louisville | 2 | – | 3 | – | 0 | 2 | – | 5 | – | 0 |
| Louisiana College | 2 | – | 4 | – | 1 | 3 | – | 4 | – | 1 |
| Middle Tennessee State Teachers | 1 | – | 3 | – | 0 | 2 | – | 7 | – | 0 |
| Mercer | 1 | – | 4 | – | 0 | 3 | – | 6 | – | 1 |
| Newberry | 1 | – | 4 | – | 0 | 4 | – | 7 | – | 0 |
| Tennessee Tech | 1 | – | 4 | – | 0 | 3 | – | 5 | – | 1 |
| Eastern Kentucky State Teachers | 1 | – | 5 | – | 0 | 1 | – | 6 | – | 0 |
| Stetson | 0 | – | 2 | – | 1 | 2 | – | 4 | – | 1 |
| Morehead State | 0 | – | 4 | – | 0 | 2 | – | 4 | – | 0 |
| Erskine | 0 | – | 4 | – | 0 | 1 | – | 8 | – | 0 |
| Louisiana Tech | 0 | – | 5 | – | 0 | 4 | – | 6 | – | 0 |
$ – Conference champion

The 1934 Murray State Thoroughbreds football team was an American football team that represented Murray State Teachers College—now known as Murray State University—as a member of the Southern Intercollegiate Athletic Association (SIAA) during the 1934 college football season. Led by third-year head coach Roy Stewart, the Thoroughbreds compiled an overall record of 6–3 with a mark of 5–2 in conference play, placing tenth in the SIAA.

== Schedule ==
| Date | Opponent | Site | Result | Attendance | Source |
|---|---|---|---|---|---|
| September 29 | Lambuth* | Murray High School; Murray, KY | W 48–0 | | |
| October 5 | Stetson | Murray, KY | W 19–7 | | |
| October 12 | at Millsaps | Alumni Field; Jackson, MS | L 6–7 | 4,000 | |
| October 20 | Tennessee Tech | Murray, KY | W 40–7 | | |
| October 27 | Birmingham–Southern*^{†} | College Stadium; Murray, KY | L 7–20 | 4,200 | |
| November 2 | Union (TN) | College Stadium; Murray, KY | W 19–0 | | |
| November 10 | at Middle Tennessee State Teachers | Murfreesboro, TN | W 12–0 | | |
| November 17 | Western Kentucky State Teachers | College Stadium; Murray, KY | W 27–14 | 5,000 | |
| November 29 | at Mississippi State Teachers | Faulkner Field; Hattiesburg, MS | L 2–12 | | |
*Non-conference game; ^{†}Homecoming
