= 1934 Furman Purple Hurricane football team =

American college football season

1934 Furman Purple Hurricane football

SIAA champion
- Conference: Southern Intercollegiate Athletic Association
- Record: 5–4 (4–0 SIAA)
- Head coach: Dizzy McLeod (3rd season)
- Captain: Bob Turner
- Home stadium: Manly Field

1934 Southern Intercollegiate Athletic Association football standings
	Conf.					Overall
Team	W		L		T	W		L		T
Furman $	4	–	0	–	0	5	–	4	–	0
Union (KY)	4	–	0	–	1	5	–	0	–	2
Millsaps	4	–	0	–	2	7	–	1	–	2
Centenary	3	–	0	–	0	10	–	2	–	0
Rollins	3	–	0	–	0	5	–	3	–	0
Centre	4	–	1	–	0	5	–	5	–	0
Western Kentucky State Teachers	4	–	1	–	1	4	–	2	–	2
Loyola (LA)	3	–	1	–	0	4	–	5	–	0
The Citadel	3	–	1	–	0	3	–	5	–	1
Murray State	5	–	2	–	0	6	–	3	–	0
Miami (FL)	2	–	1	–	1	5	–	3	–	1
Mississippi College	4	–	2	–	0	5	–	4	–	0
Howard (AL)	2	–	1	–	1	3	–	4	–	2
Louisiana Normal	3	–	2	–	0	4	–	3	–	1
Presbyterian	3	–	2	–	1	3	–	4	–	2
Transylvania	3	–	3	–	0	3	–	5	–	0
Georgetown (KY)	2	–	2	–	1	2	–	6	–	1
Southwestern (TN)	1	–	1	–	1	3	–	6	–	1
SW Louisiana	2	–	3	–	0	4	–	5	–	0
Union (TN)	2	–	3	–	1	6	–	4	–	1
Wofford	2	–	3	–	1	4	–	4	–	1
Mississippi State Teachers	2	–	3	–	1	3	–	4	–	2
Louisville	2	–	3	–	0	2	–	5	–	0
Louisiana College	2	–	4	–	1	3	–	4	–	1
Middle Tennessee State Teachers	1	–	3	–	0	2	–	7	–	0
Mercer	1	–	4	–	0	3	–	6	–	1
Newberry	1	–	4	–	0	4	–	7	–	0
Tennessee Tech	1	–	4	–	0	3	–	5	–	1
Eastern Kentucky State Teachers	1	–	5	–	0	1	–	6	–	0
Stetson	0	–	2	–	1	2	–	4	–	1
Morehead State	0	–	4	–	0	2	–	4	–	0
Erskine	0	–	4	–	0	1	–	8	–	0
Louisiana Tech	0	–	5	–	0	4	–	6	–	0
$ – Conference champion

The 1934 Furman Purple Hurricane football team represented the Furman University as a member of the Southern Intercollegiate Athletic Association (SIAA) during the 1934 college football season. Led by third-year head coach Dizzy McLeod, the Purple Hurricane compiled an overall record of 5–4 with a mark of 4–0 in conference play, winning the SIAA title.

== Schedule ==
Date	Time	Opponent	Site	Result	Attendance	Source
September 29		at Wofford	Snyder Field; Spartanburg, SC (rivalry)	W 13–0	3,000	
October 6		Georgia*	Manly Field; Greenville, SC	L 2–7		
October 11	2:30 p.m.	vs. Wake Forest*	Pee Dee Fair; Florence, SC	W 3–2		
October 20		at Mercer	Centennial Stadium; Macon, GA	W 9–3		
October 27	3:00 p.m.	Centre	Manly Field; Greenville, SC	W 7–6	3,000	
November 3		Bucknell*	Manly Field; Greenville, SC	L 0–19	4,000	
November 10		at The Citadel	Johnson Hagood Stadium; Charleston, SC (rivalry)	W 6–0	4,000	
November 17		South Carolina*	Manly Field; Greenville, SC	L 0–2	8,000	
November 29		at Clemson*	Riggs Field; Clemson, SC	L 0–7	10,500	
*Non-conference game; All times are in Eastern time
