= 1934 The Citadel Bulldogs football team =

American college football season

1934 The Citadel Bulldogs football
- Conference: Southern Intercollegiate Athletic Association
- Record: 3–5–1 (3–1 SIAA)
- Head coach: Tatum Gressette (3rd season)
- Home stadium: Johnson Hagood Stadium

1934 Southern Intercollegiate Athletic Association football standings
	Conf.					Overall
Team	W		L		T	W		L		T
Furman $	4	–	0	–	0	5	–	4	–	0
Union (KY)	4	–	0	–	1	5	–	0	–	2
Millsaps	4	–	0	–	2	7	–	1	–	2
Centenary	3	–	0	–	0	10	–	2	–	0
Rollins	3	–	0	–	0	5	–	3	–	0
Centre	4	–	1	–	0	5	–	5	–	0
Western Kentucky State Teachers	4	–	1	–	1	4	–	2	–	2
Loyola (LA)	3	–	1	–	0	4	–	5	–	0
The Citadel	3	–	1	–	0	3	–	5	–	1
Murray State	5	–	2	–	0	6	–	3	–	0
Miami (FL)	2	–	1	–	1	5	–	3	–	1
Mississippi College	4	–	2	–	0	5	–	4	–	0
Howard (AL)	2	–	1	–	1	3	–	4	–	2
Louisiana Normal	3	–	2	–	0	4	–	3	–	1
Presbyterian	3	–	2	–	1	3	–	4	–	2
Transylvania	3	–	3	–	0	3	–	5	–	0
Georgetown (KY)	2	–	2	–	1	2	–	6	–	1
Southwestern (TN)	1	–	1	–	1	3	–	6	–	1
SW Louisiana	2	–	3	–	0	4	–	5	–	0
Union (TN)	2	–	3	–	1	6	–	4	–	1
Wofford	2	–	3	–	1	4	–	4	–	1
Mississippi State Teachers	2	–	3	–	1	3	–	4	–	2
Louisville	2	–	3	–	0	2	–	5	–	0
Louisiana College	2	–	4	–	1	3	–	4	–	1
Middle Tennessee State Teachers	1	–	3	–	0	2	–	7	–	0
Mercer	1	–	4	–	0	3	–	6	–	1
Newberry	1	–	4	–	0	4	–	7	–	0
Tennessee Tech	1	–	4	–	0	3	–	5	–	1
Eastern Kentucky State Teachers	1	–	5	–	0	1	–	6	–	0
Stetson	0	–	2	–	1	2	–	4	–	1
Morehead State	0	–	4	–	0	2	–	4	–	0
Erskine	0	–	4	–	0	1	–	8	–	0
Louisiana Tech	0	–	5	–	0	4	–	6	–	0
$ – Conference champion

The 1934 The Citadel Bulldogs football team represented The Citadel, The Military College of South Carolina in the 1934 college football season. Tatum Gressette served as head coach for the third season. The Bulldogs played as members of the Southern Intercollegiate Athletic Association and played home games at Johnson Hagood Stadium.

== Schedule ==
Date	Opponent	Site	Result	Attendance	Source
September 29	Newberry	Johnson Hagood Stadium; Charleston, SC	W 13–7		
October 6	vs. Oglethorpe*	Augusta, GA	L 6–12		
October 12	at George Washington*	Griffith Stadium; Washington, DC	L 0–26		
October 18	vs. South Carolina*	County Fairgrounds; Orangeburg, SC	L 6–20	7,000	
October 27	Davidson*	Johnson Hagood Stadium; Charleston, SC	T 12–12		
November 3	at Wofford	Snyder Field; Spartanburg, SC (rivalry)	W 18–7	5,000	
November 10	Furman	Johnson Hagood Stadium; Charleston, SC (rivalry)	L 0–6	4,000	
November 17	at Army*	Michie Stadium; West Point, NY	L 0–34	10,000	
November 29	Presbyterian	Johnson Hagood Stadium; Charleston, SC	W 13–7		
*Non-conference game
