= 1934 Middle Tennessee State Teachers Blue Raiders football team =

American college football season

1934 Middle Tennessee State Teachers Blue Raiders football
- Conference: Southern Intercollegiate Athletic Association
- Record: 2–7 (1–3 SIAA)
- Head coach: E. M. Waller (2nd season)
- Captain: Buck Edwards

1934 Southern Intercollegiate Athletic Association football standings
	Conf.					Overall
Team	W		L		T	W		L		T
Furman $	4	–	0	–	0	5	–	4	–	0
Union (KY)	4	–	0	–	1	5	–	0	–	2
Millsaps	4	–	0	–	2	7	–	1	–	2
Centenary	3	–	0	–	0	10	–	2	–	0
Rollins	3	–	0	–	0	5	–	3	–	0
Centre	4	–	1	–	0	5	–	5	–	0
Western Kentucky State Teachers	4	–	1	–	1	4	–	2	–	2
Loyola (LA)	3	–	1	–	0	4	–	5	–	0
The Citadel	3	–	1	–	0	3	–	5	–	1
Murray State	5	–	2	–	0	6	–	3	–	0
Miami (FL)	2	–	1	–	1	5	–	3	–	1
Mississippi College	4	–	2	–	0	5	–	4	–	0
Howard (AL)	2	–	1	–	1	3	–	4	–	2
Louisiana Normal	3	–	2	–	0	4	–	3	–	1
Presbyterian	3	–	2	–	1	3	–	4	–	2
Transylvania	3	–	3	–	0	3	–	5	–	0
Georgetown (KY)	2	–	2	–	1	2	–	6	–	1
Southwestern (TN)	1	–	1	–	1	3	–	6	–	1
SW Louisiana	2	–	3	–	0	4	–	5	–	0
Union (TN)	2	–	3	–	1	6	–	4	–	1
Wofford	2	–	3	–	1	4	–	4	–	1
Mississippi State Teachers	2	–	3	–	1	3	–	4	–	2
Louisville	2	–	3	–	0	2	–	5	–	0
Louisiana College	2	–	4	–	1	3	–	4	–	1
Middle Tennessee State Teachers	1	–	3	–	0	2	–	7	–	0
Mercer	1	–	4	–	0	3	–	6	–	1
Newberry	1	–	4	–	0	4	–	7	–	0
Tennessee Tech	1	–	4	–	0	3	–	5	–	1
Eastern Kentucky State Teachers	1	–	5	–	0	1	–	6	–	0
Stetson	0	–	2	–	1	2	–	4	–	1
Morehead State	0	–	4	–	0	2	–	4	–	0
Erskine	0	–	4	–	0	1	–	8	–	0
Louisiana Tech	0	–	5	–	0	4	–	6	–	0
$ – Conference champion

The 1934 Middle Tennessee State Teachers football team represented the Middle Tennessee State Teachers College (now known as Middle Tennessee State University) as a member of the Southern Intercollegiate Athletic Association (SIAA) during the 1934 college football season. Led by E. M. Waller in his second and final season as head coach, Middle Tennessee State Teachers compiled an overall record of 2–7 with a mark of 1–3 in conference play. The team's captain was Buck Edwards.

== Schedule ==
Date	Time	Opponent	Site	Result	Attendance	Source
September 28		Freed–Hardeman*	Murfreesboro, TN	W 18–0		
October 6		at Chattanooga*	Chamberlain Field; Chattanooga, TN	L 0–9		
October 12		Union (TN)	Murfreesboro, TN	W 6–0		
October 20		at Cumberland (TN)*	Lebanon, TN	L 0–12		
October 26		Western Kentucky State Teachers	Murfreesboro, TN (rivalry)	L 0–14		
November 3	2:30 p.m.	at West Tennessee State Teachers*	Memorial Field; Memphis, TN	L 0–18	1,000	
November 10		Murray State	Murfreesboro, TN	L 0–12		
November 16		at Maryville (TN)*	Maryville, TN	L 6–13		
November 29		at Tennessee Tech	Cookeville, TN	L 0–12		
*Non-conference game
