= 1934 Miami Hurricanes football team =

American college football season

1934 Miami Hurricanes football

Orange Bowl, L 0–26 vs. Bucknell
- Conference: Southern Intercollegiate Athletic Association
- Record: 5–3–1 (2–1–1 SIAA)
- Head coach: Tom McCann (4th season)
- Home stadium: Moore Park

1934 Southern Intercollegiate Athletic Association football standings
	Conf.					Overall
Team	W		L		T	W		L		T
Furman $	4	–	0	–	0	5	–	4	–	0
Union (KY)	4	–	0	–	1	5	–	0	–	2
Millsaps	4	–	0	–	2	7	–	1	–	2
Centenary	3	–	0	–	0	10	–	2	–	0
Rollins	3	–	0	–	0	5	–	3	–	0
Centre	4	–	1	–	0	5	–	5	–	0
Western Kentucky State Teachers	4	–	1	–	1	4	–	2	–	2
Loyola (LA)	3	–	1	–	0	4	–	5	–	0
The Citadel	3	–	1	–	0	3	–	5	–	1
Murray State	5	–	2	–	0	6	–	3	–	0
Miami (FL)	2	–	1	–	1	5	–	3	–	1
Mississippi College	4	–	2	–	0	5	–	4	–	0
Howard (AL)	2	–	1	–	1	3	–	4	–	2
Louisiana Normal	3	–	2	–	0	4	–	3	–	1
Presbyterian	3	–	2	–	1	3	–	4	–	2
Transylvania	3	–	3	–	0	3	–	5	–	0
Georgetown (KY)	2	–	2	–	1	2	–	6	–	1
Southwestern (TN)	1	–	1	–	1	3	–	6	–	1
SW Louisiana	2	–	3	–	0	4	–	5	–	0
Union (TN)	2	–	3	–	1	6	–	4	–	1
Wofford	2	–	3	–	1	4	–	4	–	1
Mississippi State Teachers	2	–	3	–	1	3	–	4	–	2
Louisville	2	–	3	–	0	2	–	5	–	0
Louisiana College	2	–	4	–	1	3	–	4	–	1
Middle Tennessee State Teachers	1	–	3	–	0	2	–	7	–	0
Mercer	1	–	4	–	0	3	–	6	–	1
Newberry	1	–	4	–	0	4	–	7	–	0
Tennessee Tech	1	–	4	–	0	3	–	5	–	1
Eastern Kentucky State Teachers	1	–	5	–	0	1	–	6	–	0
Stetson	0	–	2	–	1	2	–	4	–	1
Morehead State	0	–	4	–	0	2	–	4	–	0
Erskine	0	–	4	–	0	1	–	8	–	0
Louisiana Tech	0	–	5	–	0	4	–	6	–	0
$ – Conference champion

The 1934 Miami Hurricanes football team represented the University of Miami as a member of the Southern Intercollegiate Athletic Association (SIAA) in the 1934 college football season. The Hurricanes played their home games at Moore Park in Miami, Florida. The team was coached by Tom McCann, in his fourth and final year as head coach for the Hurricanes. Finishing the season with a 5–3–1 record, the Hurricanes were invited to play in the first edition of the post-season Orange Bowl. The Hurricanes lost, 26–0, to Bucknell.

== Schedule ==
Date	Opponent	Site	Result	Attendance	Source
October 12	Southeastern Louisiana*	Moore Park; Miami, FL	W 26–7		
October 18	Southern College (FL)*	Moore Park; Miami, FL	W 26–6		
October 26	Wofford	Moore Park; Miami, FL	W 42–14		
November 2	Stetson	Moore Park; Miami, FL	T 6–6		
November 10	at Rollins	Tinker Field; Orlando, FL	L 0–14		
November 16	Oglethorpe*	Moore Park; Miami, FL	W 19–6		
November 23	at Tampa*	Plant Field; Tampa, FL	L 6–7	6,000	
November 30	Baltimore*	Moore Park; Miami, FL	W 25–6		
January 1	vs. Bucknell*	Miami Field Stadium; Miami, FL (Orange Bowl)	L 0–26	5,134	
*Non-conference game
