= 1934 college football season =

American college football season

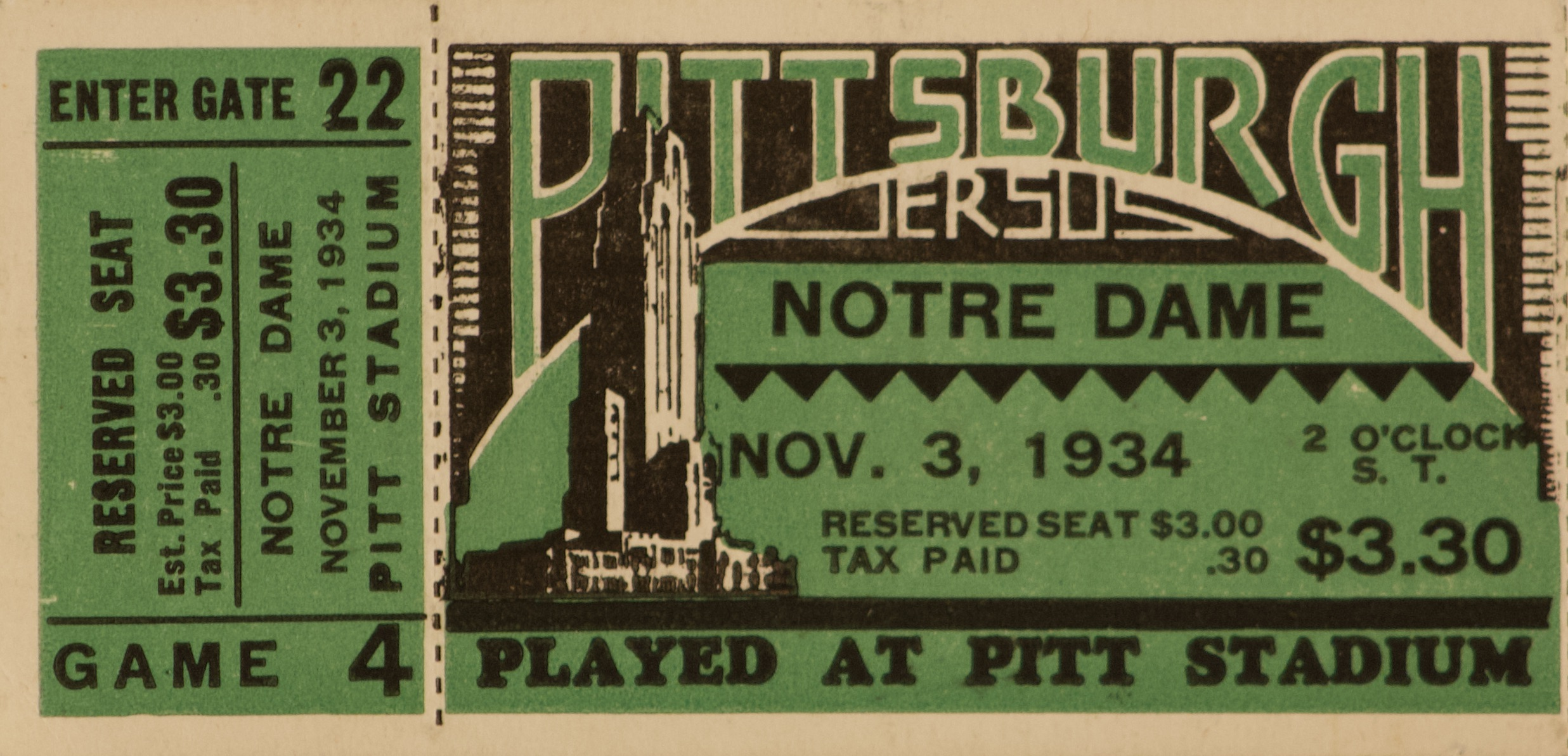
- Ticket stub for Pitt vs. Notre Dame
- Number of bowls: 3
- Bowl games: January 1, 1935
- Champion(s): Minnesota (Note: per AP poll, Boand System, Billingsley Report, Dickinson System (received Rockne Trophy), Toledo Cup, College Football Researchers Association, Helms Athletic Foundation, National Championship Foundation, Sagarin Ratings Elo chess method, and Sagarin Ratings Predictor method); Alabama (Note: per Dunkel System, Houlgate System, Litkenhous Ratings, Williamson System, Berryman QPRS, and Poling System)

The 1934 college football season was the 66th season of college football in the United States. Two New Year's Day bowl games were initiated to rival the Rose Bowl Game. On February 15, Warren V. Miller and Joseph M. Cousins organized the New Orleans Mid-Winter Sports Association and by October, the group had enough funds to sponsor the Sugar Bowl. Meanwhile, W. Keith Phillips and the Greater Miami Athletic Club worked in November at a January 1 game for Florida, and the Orange Bowl was created.

Once again, University of Illinois Professor Frank Dickinson's math system selected a Big Ten team as national champion, the undefeated Minnesota Golden Gophers. William Boand and Professor Edward Earl Litkenhous also selected Minnesota at the end of the season. The conference, however, still had a bar against its members playing in the postseason, so Minnesota did not play in any of the bowl games. The undefeated and eventual Rose Bowl champion Alabama Crimson Tide was selected as national champion by the other contemporary math system selectors, Dick Dunkel, Paul Williamson and Deke Houlgate.

== Conference realignment ==
=== Membership changes ===
School	1933 conference	1934 conference
Butler Bulldogs	Missouri Valley	Indiana
Iowa Teachers Panthers	Iowa	North Central
Loyola (MD) Greyhounds	Independent	dropped program
Omaha Mavericks	Independent	North Central

== September ==
September 22 Stanford opened with a 48–0 win over San Jose State, while in Houston, Rice opened with a 12–0 win over Loyola College of New Orleans.

September 29 Minnesota beat North Dakota State 56–12 and Illinois beat Bradley 40–7. Alabama beat Samford 24–0, and Tulane beat UT-Chattanooga 41–0. Rice and LSU played to a 9–9 tie while Stanford and Santa Clara tied 7–7. Navy defeated William & Mary 20–7 while Pittsburgh beat Washington & Jefferson 26–6.

== October ==
October 6 Minnesota beat Nebraska, 20–0, in Minneapolis. Alabama beat Sewanee, 35–6, in Montgomery Alabama. Illinois beat Washington University, 12–7, in St. Louis. Navy beat Virginia 21–6 in a game in Washington, DC. In New Orleans, Tulane beat Auburn 13–0. At Portland, Stanford beat Oregon State 17–0. Columbia opened its season in New York with a 12–6 win over Yale, and Colgate beat St. Lawrence 32–0. Pittsburgh won at West Virginia 27–6. Ohio State beat Indiana 33–0. Rice won at Purdue 14–0.

October 13 Illinois beat Ohio State 14–13. Stanford beat visiting Northwestern 20–0. Pittsburgh defeated visiting USC 20–6. Alabama defeated Mississippi State 41–0, Rice defeated SMU 9–0, and Tulane won at Florida 28–12. Navy defeated Maryland 16–13, Colgate beat St. Bonaventure 62–0 and Columbia beat VMI 29–6.

October 20 Minnesota won at Pittsburgh, 13–7. Ohio State defeated visiting Colgate 10–7. Navy beat Columbia 18–7. Alabama and Tennessee, both 3–0–0, met in Birmingham, with Bama winning 13–6. Tulane edged visiting Georgia 7–6. In Omaha, Rice beat Creighton University 47–13. Stanford beat USF at San Francisco, 3–0.

October 27 Alabama beat Georgia 26–6 at Birmingham, while in New Orleans, Tulane beat Georgia Tech 20–12. Rice stayed unbeaten with a 20–9 win over visiting Texas. Minnesota won at Iowa 48–12, . Illinois won at Michigan 7–6, and Ohio State won at Northwestern 28–6. Stanford registered its fourth shutout, a 16–0 win over USC. Navy won at Penn, Colgate won at Holy Cross 20–7 and Columbia beat visiting Penn State 14–7. Pittsburgh beat host school Westminster College of Pennsylvania, 30–0

== November ==
November 3 Pitt (4–1–0) and Notre Dame (3–0–0) met in Pittsburgh, with the Panthers winning 19–0. Minnesota beat Michigan 34–0. In Cleveland, Ohio State won at Western Reserve 76–0. Illinois beat Army 7–0. Alabama won at Kentucky 34–14. Rice beat Texas A&I 27–0. Tulane beat Ole Miss 15–0. In Los Angeles, Stanford beat UCLA 27–0. Columbia defeated Cornell 14–0 and Navy beat Washington & Lee 26–0.

November 10 At Yankee Stadium, Tulane (6–0–0) faced Colgate (3–1–0), with the Red Raiders handing the Green Wave their first loss, 20–6. In a meeting of unbeaten teams, Stanford (7–0–1) hosted Washington (4–0–0) and had a sixth straight shutout 24–0. Over in Cleveland, Navy beat Notre Dame 10–6. Pittsburgh won at Nebraska 25–6. Minnesota beat Indiana 30–0, Illinois won at Northwestern 14–3, and Ohio State beat Chicago 33–0 Alabama beat Clemson 40–0 and Rice won at Arkansas 7–0. Columbia beat Brown 39–0

November 17 Navy (7–0–0) hosted Pittsburgh (6–1–0) and lost 31–7

Minnesota beat Chicago 35–7 and Ohio State defeated Michigan 34–0. Previously unbeaten (6–0–0) Illinois was upset at Madison when it faced a (3–3–0) Wisconsin Badgers team, falling 7–3. Alabama defeated Georgia Tech 40–0, while Tulane won at Kentucky 20–7. Stanford beat the Olympic Club team 40–0, and had a record of 192–7 against its opponents to that time. Colgate won at Syracuse 13–2 and Columbia edged Penn 13–12. Rice beat Texas A&M 25–6. Yale's 11 "Iron Men" (they played the entire game with no substitutions) upset Princeton 7–0 at Princeton.

November 24 Minnesota won at Wisconsin 34–0, Ohio State beat Iowa 40–7, and Illinois won at Chicago 7–1. Stanford clinched a trip to the Rose Bowl with a 9–7 win at California. Colgate beat Rutgers 14–0. Tulane beat Sewanee 32–0. Columbia (7–1–0) beat Syracuse (6–1–0) in a Sunday game 12–0. In Houston, previously unbeaten (8–0–1) Rice hosted (6–3–0) Texas Christian (TCU) and was upset, 7–2.

On Thanksgiving Day, November 29, Alabama beat Vanderbilt in Birmingham, 34–0, and was invited soon after to meet Stanford at the Rose Bowl. Pittsburgh beat crosstown rival Carnegie Tech, 20–0, and Kansas State beat Nebraska 19–7 to clinch the Big Six Conference championship.

== December ==
December 1 In Louisiana, Tulane (8–1–0) and LSU (6–0–2) faced each other in Baton Rouge. Both teams were likely hosts for the first Sugar Bowl in New Orleans, and Tulane edged the Tigers 13–12 to become the host team, where it would face 7–0–2 Temple University. Rice ended at 9–1–1 with a 32–0 win at Baylor. Colgate closed its season with a 20–13 win in Providence against Brown. At the Army–Navy Game, held in Philadelphia, Navy (7–1–0) beat Army (7–2–0) on a field goal, 3–0.

== Conference standings ==
For this article, major conferences defined as those including multiple state flagship public universities.

=== Major conference standings ===
1934 Big Six Conference football standings
	Conf.					Overall
Team	W		L		T	W		L		T
Kansas State $	5	–	0	–	0	7	–	2	–	1
Nebraska	4	–	1	–	0	6	–	3	–	0
Oklahoma	2	–	2	–	1	3	–	4	–	2
Kansas	1	–	2	–	2	3	–	4	–	3
Iowa State	1	–	3	–	1	5	–	3	–	1
Missouri	0	–	5	–	0	0	–	8	–	1
$ – Conference champion

1934 Big Ten Conference football standings
	Conf.					Overall
Team	W		L		T	W		L		T
No. 1 Minnesota $	5	–	0	–	0	8	–	0	–	0
No. 9 Ohio State	5	–	1	–	0	7	–	1	–	0
No. 6 Illinois	4	–	1	–	0	7	–	1	–	0
Purdue	3	–	1	–	0	5	–	3	–	0
Wisconsin	2	–	3	–	0	4	–	4	–	0
Northwestern	2	–	3	–	0	3	–	5	–	0
Chicago	2	–	4	–	0	4	–	4	–	0
Indiana	1	–	3	–	1	3	–	3	–	2
Iowa	1	–	3	–	1	2	–	5	–	1
Michigan	0	–	6	–	0	1	–	7	–	0
$ – Conference champion; Rankings from Associated Press

1934 Border Conference football standings
	Conf.					Overall
Team	W		L		T	W		L		T
Texas Tech	1	–	0	–	0	7	–	2	–	1
New Mexico	3	–	1	–	0	8	–	1	–	0
Arizona	2	–	1	–	1	7	–	2	–	1
Arizona State	2	–	2	–	1	4	–	3	–	1
New Mexico A&M	0	–	1	–	3	4	–	1	–	3
Arizona State–Flagstaff	0	–	3	–	1	1	–	5	–	1

1934 Pacific Coast Conference football standings
	Conf.					Overall
Team	W		L		T	W		L		T
No. 2 Stanford $	5	–	0	–	0	9	–	1	–	1
Washington State	4	–	0	–	1	4	–	3	–	1
Washington	5	–	1	–	1	6	–	1	–	1
Oregon	4	–	2	–	0	6	–	4	–	0
California	3	–	2	–	0	6	–	6	–	0
UCLA	2	–	3	–	0	7	–	3	–	0
USC	1	–	4	–	1	4	–	6	–	1
Idaho	1	–	4	–	0	3	–	5	–	0
Oregon State	0	–	5	–	2	3	–	6	–	2
Montana	0	–	4	–	1	2	–	5	–	1
$ – Conference champion; Rankings from Associated Press

1934 Rocky Mountain Conference football standings
	Conf.					Overall
Team	W		L		T	W		L		T
Colorado Teachers +	6	–	1	–	0	6	–	1	–	0
Colorado +	6	–	1	–	0	6	–	1	–	2
Colorado Agricultural +	6	–	1	–	1	6	–	2	–	1
Utah State	5	–	1	–	1	5	–	1	–	1
Utah	4	–	2	–	0	5	–	3	–	0
Denver	4	–	4	–	0	5	–	5	–	1
BYU	3	–	5	–	0	4	–	5	–	0
Wyoming	2	–	4	–	0	3	–	5	–	0
Colorado College	1	–	6	–	0	1	–	7	–	0
Colorado Mines	1	–	6	–	0	1	–	6	–	0
Western State (CO)	0	–	3	–	0	2	–	5	–	0
Montana State	0	–	4	–	0	2	–	5	–	0
+ – Conference co-champions

1934 Southeastern Conference football standings
	Conf.					Overall
Team		W		L			W		L
No. 11 Tulane +	8	–	0	–	0	10	–	1	–	0
No. 6 Alabama +	7	–	0	–	0	10	–	0	–	0
Tennessee	5	–	1	–	0	8	–	2	–	0
LSU	4	–	2	–	0	7	–	2	–	2
Georgia	3	–	2	–	0	7	–	3	–	0
Vanderbilt	4	–	3	–	0	6	–	3	–	0
Florida	2	–	2	–	1	6	–	3	–	1
Ole Miss	2	–	3	–	1	4	–	5	–	1
Kentucky	1	–	3	–	0	5	–	5	–	0
Auburn	1	–	6	–	0	2	–	8	–	0
Sewanee	0	–	4	–	0	2	–	7	–	0
Mississippi State	0	–	5	–	0	4	–	6	–	0
Georgia Tech	0	–	6	–	0	1	–	9	–	0
+ – Conference co-champions; Rankings from Dickinson System

1934 Southern Conference football standings
	Conf.					Overall
Team	W		L		T	W		L		T
Washington and Lee $	4	–	0	–	0	7	–	3	–	0
North Carolina	2	–	0	–	1	7	–	1	–	1
Duke	3	–	1	–	0	7	–	2	–	0
Maryland	3	–	1	–	0	7	–	3	–	0
Clemson	2	–	1	–	0	5	–	4	–	0
VPI	3	–	3	–	0	5	–	5	–	0
South Carolina	2	–	3	–	0	5	–	4	–	0
NC State	1	–	3	–	1	2	–	6	–	1
Virginia	1	–	4	–	0	3	–	6	–	0
VMI	0	–	5	–	0	1	–	8	–	0
$ – Conference champion

1934 Southwest Conference football standings
	Conf.					Overall
Team	W		L		T	W		L		T
No. 5 Rice $	5	–	1	–	0	9	–	1	–	1
Texas	4	–	1	–	1	7	–	2	–	1
SMU	3	–	2	–	1	8	–	2	–	2
TCU	3	–	3	–	0	8	–	4	–	0
Arkansas	2	–	3	–	1	4	–	4	–	2
Texas A&M	1	–	4	–	1	2	–	7	–	2
Baylor	1	–	5	–	0	3	–	7	–	0
$ – Conference champion; Rankings from Dickinson System

=== Independents ===
1934 Eastern college football independents records
	Conf.			Overall
Team	W	L	T	W		L		T
Tufts		–		8	–	0	–	0
Trinity (CT)		–		7	–	0	–	0
La Salle		–		7	–	0	–	1
Washington College		–		5	–	0	–	1
Franklin & Marshall		–		8	–	1	–	0
No. 4 Pittsburgh		–		8	–	1	–	0
No. 8 Colgate		–		7	–	1	–	0
Columbia		–		7	–	1	–	0
No. 5 Princeton		–		7	–	1	–	0
Duquesne		–		8	–	2	–	0
Holy Cross		–		8	–	2	–	0
No. 15 Temple		–		7	–	1	–	2
No. 10 Syracuse		–		6	–	2	–	0
Bucknell		–		7	–	2	–	2
No. 14 Army		–		7	–	3	–	0
Northeastern		–		6	–	1	–	1
Rochester		–		5	–	2	–	0
Dartmouth		–		6	–	3	–	0
Saint Anselm		–		6	–	3	–	0
Amherst		–		5	–	3	–	0
Fordham		–		5	–	3	–	0
Yale		–		5	–	3	–	0
Massachusetts State		–		5	–	3	–	1
CCNY		–		4	–	3	–	0
Providence		–		4	–	3	–	0
Drexel		–		4	–	3	–	1
Boston College		–		5	–	4	–	0
Bates		–		3	–	3	–	1
Middlebury		–		3	–	3	–	1
Penn		–		4	–	4	–	0
Penn State		–		4	–	4	–	0
Williams		–		4	–	4	–	0
Carnegie Tech		–		4	–	5	–	0
Washington & Jefferson		–		4	–	5	–	0
Villanova		–		3	–	4	–	2
NYU		–		3	–	4	–	1
Boston University		–		3	–	4	–	0
Colby		–		3	–	4	–	0
Springfield		–		2	–	3	–	3
Manhattan		–		3	–	5	–	1
Harvard		–		3	–	5	–	0
Vermont		–		2	–	4	–	2
Wesleyan		–		3	–	5	–	0
Brown		–		3	–	6	–	0
Geneva		–		2	–	5	–	2
Saint Joseph's		–		2	–	5	–	1
Cornell		–		2	–	5	–	0
Lafayette		–		2	–	6	–	0
Norwich		–		2	–	6	–	0
Bowdoin		–		0	–	6	–	1
Lowell Textile		–		0	–	7	–	1
Rankings from Associated Press

1934 Midwestern college football independents records
	Conf.			Overall
Team	W	L	T	W		L		T
Michigan State		–		8	–	1	–	0
Wayne		–		7	–	1	–	0
Western State Teachers (MI)		–		7	–	1	–	0
Michigan State Normal		–		5	–	2	–	0
Notre Dame		–		6	–	3	–	0
Central State (MI)		–		5	–	3	–	0
Detroit		–		5	–	3	–	1
DePaul		–		4	–	3	–	0
Saint Louis		–		3	–	3	–	2
Marquette		–		4	–	5	–	0
Michigan Tech		–		1	–	2	–	1
Haskell		–		3	–	6	–	1
Missouri Mines		–		2	–	6	–	0
Wittenberg		–		2	–	7	–	0

1934 Southern college football independents records
	Conf.			Overall
Team	W	L	T	W		L		T
Western Maryland		–		8	–	0	–	1
No. 7 Navy		–		8	–	1	–	0
Tennessee State		–		6	–	1	–	1
Texas A&I		–		5	–	1	–	1
Troy State		–		7	–	2	–	0
Tulsa		–		5	–	2	–	1
George Washington		–		6	–	3	–	1
Tampa		–		8	–	4	–	0
West Virginia		–		6	–	4	–	0
Oglethorpe		–		5	–	4	–	1
Delaware		–		4	–	3	–	1
Georgetown		–		4	–	3	–	1
Texas Mines		–		4	–	4	–	0
Catholic University		–		3	–	4	–	1
Jacksonville State		–		3	–	4	–	0
South Georgia Teachers		–		4	–	5	–	0
William & Mary Norfolk		–		2	–	4	–	2
Wake Forest		–		3	–	7	–	0
East Carolina		–		1	–	4	–	1
Oklahoma City		–		1	–	8	–	0
Dixie (TX)		–		0	–	7	–	0
Rankings from Associated Press

1934 Western college football independents records
	Conf.			Overall
Team	W	L	T	W		L		T
Hawaii		–		6	–	0	–	0
Gonzaga		–		8	–	2	–	1
Saint Mary's		–		7	–	2	–	0
Loyola (CA)		–		7	–	2	–	1
No. 11 Santa Clara		–		7	–	2	–	1
Cal Poly		–		6	–	2	–	0
San Francisco		–		3	–	3	–	1
San Francisco State		–		3	–	3	–	1
Pomona		–		2	–	5	–	1
Humboldt State		–		1	–	3	–	0
Columbia (OR)		–		1	–	6	–	1
Rankings from Associated Press

=== Minor conference standings ===
1934 Buckeye Athletic Association football standings
	Conf.					Overall
Team	W		L		T	W		L		T
Cincinnati $	3	–	0	–	1	6	–	2	–	1
Ohio Wesleyan	3	–	1	–	0	7	–	2	–	0
Miami (OH)	2	–	2	–	0	5	–	4	–	0
Ohio	1	–	2	–	1	4	–	4	–	1
Marshall	0	–	4	–	0	3	–	6	–	0
+ – Conference co-champions

1934 Central Intercollegiate Conference football standings
	Conf.					Overall
Team	W		L		T	W		L		T
Fort Hays State $	4	–	1	–	0	6	–	2	–	1
Emporia Teachers	3	–	2	–	0	7	–	2	–	0
Pittsburg State	3	–	2	–	0	6	–	3	–	0
Wichita	2	–	3	–	0	5	–	3	–	1
Washburn	2	–	3	–	0	2	–	6	–	1
Southwestern (KS)	1	–	4	–	0	5	–	5	–	0
$ – Conference champion

1934 Colored Intercollegiate Athletic Association football standings
	Conf.					Overall
Team	W		L		T	W		L		T
Morgan $	5	–	0	–	2	6	–	0	–	2
Bluefield State	7	–	0	–	1	8	–	0	–	1
North Carolina A&T	7	–	1	–	0	7	–	1	–	0
Virginia Union	4	–	2	–	2	4	–	2	–	2
Virginia State	4	–	3	–	1	4	–	4	–	1
Hampton	4	–	4	–	0	4	–	4	–	0
North Carolina College	4	–	4	–	0	4	–	5	–	0
St. Augustine's	1	–	2	–	1	3	–	2	–	1
Saint Paul (VA)	3	–	5	–	0	3	–	5	–	0
Howard	1	–	5	–	0	2	–	6	–	0
Shaw	1	–	6	–	0	1	–	6	–	1
Johnson C. Smith	0	–	4	–	1	0	–	5	–	1
Lincoln (PA)	0	–	5	–	0	1	–	6	–	0
$ – Conference champion; Conference standings were based on the Dickinson System. Howard forfeited conference wins over Hampton and Saint Paul and conference ties with Morgan and Virginia State.

1934 Dixie Conference football standings
	Conf.					Overall
Team	W		L		T	W		L		T
Birmingham–Southern $	5	–	0	–	0	9	–	0	–	0
Chattanooga	3	–	0	–	1	4	–	3	–	1
Millsaps	2	–	1	–	1	7	–	1	–	2
Mississippi College	2	–	2	–	0	5	–	4	–	0
Centre	1	–	1	–	0	5	–	5	–	0
Southwestern (TN)	1	–	3	–	1	3	–	6	–	1
Howard (AL)	0	–	1	–	0	3	–	4	–	2
Mercer	0	–	2	–	1	3	–	6	–	1
Spring Hill	0	–	4	–	0	4	–	5	–	0
$ – Conference champion

1934 Eastern Pennsylvania Collegiate Conference football standings
	Conf.					Overall
Team	W		L		T	W		L		T
Franklin & Marshall +	3	–	1	–	0	8	–	1	–	0
Gettysburg +	3	–	1	–	0	6	–	2	–	0
Ursinus	1	–	1	–	2	3	–	3	–	3
Dickinson	1	–	2	–	1	3	–	4	–	2
Muhlenberg	0	–	3	–	1	2	–	6	–	1
+ – Conference co-champions

1934 Far Western Conference football standings
	Conf.					Overall
Team	W		L		T	W		L		T
Fresno State +	3	–	0	–	1	7	–	2	–	1
San Jose State +	2	–	0	–	3	3	–	3	–	4
Chico State	2	–	1	–	1	4	–	3	–	1
Pacific (CA)	2	–	2	–	0	4	–	5	–	0
Cal Aggies	0	–	2	–	2	0	–	5	–	3
Nevada	0	–	4	–	1	1	–	7	–	1
+ – Conference co-champions

1934 Illinois Intercollegiate Athletic Conference football standings
	Conf.					Overall
Team	W		L		T	W		L		T
Augustana (IL) +	6	–	0	–	0	9	–	0	–	0
Millikin +	5	–	0	–	1	7	–	0	–	1
Southern Illinois	5	–	1	–	0	5	–	3	–	0
Illinois College	5	–	1	–	0	6	–	1	–	0
Northern Illinois State	4	–	1	–	2	5	–	1	–	2
Illinois Wesleyan	3	–	1	–	2	4	–	2	–	3
Western Illinois	4	–	2	–	0	5	–	3	–	0
Bradley	3	–	2	–	0	5	–	3	–	0
North Central	3	–	2	–	0	5	–	2	–	0
Elmhurst	2	–	2	–	0	4	–	2	–	1
Monmouth (IL)	2	–	2	–	0	6	–	2	–	1
Illinois State Normal	2	–	3	–	2	2	–	4	–	2
McKendree	1	–	4	–	0	4	–	5	–	0
Eastern Illinois	1	–	4	–	0	3	–	4	–	0
Carthage	1	–	4	–	0	2	–	6	–	0
Eureka	0	–	3	–	2	0	–	3	–	2
St. Viator	0	–	3	–	0	2	–	6	–	0
Wheaton (IL)	0	–	4	–	1	1	–	5	–	1
Knox (IL)	0	–	5	–	0	0	–	8	–	0
Lake Forest	0	–	4	–	0	3	–	4	–	1
+ – Conference co-champions

1934 Indiana Intercollegiate Conference football standings
	Conf.					Overall
Team	W		L		T	W		L		T
Butler $	6	–	0	–	1	6	–	1	–	1
DePauw	6	–	1	–	0	7	–	1	–	0
Hanover	4	–	1	–	0	7	–	2	–	0
Valparaiso	4	–	1	–	0	6	–	2	–	0
Wabash	4	–	1	–	2	4	–	2	–	2
Earlham	2	–	2	–	0	3	–	4	–	0
Indiana State	3	–	3	–	0	3	–	5	–	0
Evansville	3	–	4	–	1	3	–	4	–	1
Franklin (IN)	3	–	5	–	0	3	–	5	–	0
Manchester	1	–	2	–	0	6	–	2	–	0
Ball State	2	–	6	–	0	2	–	6	–	0
Central Normal	1	–	4	–	0	2	–	5	–	0
Rose Poly	1	–	5	–	0	2	–	6	–	0
Oakland City	0	–	5	–	0	0	–	7	–	0
$ – Conference champion

1934 Iowa Conference football standings
	Conf.					Overall
Team	W		L		T	W		L		T
Simpson (IA) $	3	–	2	–	1	3	–	5	–	2
St. Ambrose	5	–	0	–	0	6	–	2	–	0
Parsons	5	–	1	–	0	6	–	2	–	0
Iowa State Teachers	1	–	0	–	2	3	–	3	–	2
Buena Vista	3	–	2	–	0	6	–	2	–	0
Upper Iowa	5	–	0	–	0	6	–	0	–	0
Dubuque	0	–	2	–	1	2	–	3	–	1
Luther	2	–	1	–	2	3	–	3	–	2
Morningside	1	–	2	–	0	4	–	3	–	1
Penn (IA)	1	–	3	–	1	2	–	4	–	1
Columbia (IA)	1	–	3	–	1	1	–	4	–	1
Western Union	0	–	3	–	0	0	–	7	–	0
Iowa Wesleyan	1	–	4	–	1	3	–	5	–	1
Central (IA)	1	–	6	–	1	1	–	6	–	1
$ – Conference champion; Conference standings were based on Stanley-Dean ranking.

1934 Kansas Collegiate Athletic Conference football standings
	Conf.					Overall
Team	W		L		T	W		L		T
Kansas Wesleyan +	4	–	1	–	0	5	–	4	–	0
Baker +	4	–	1	–	0	4	–	4	–	1
McPherson	3	–	1	–	1	6	–	2	–	1
College of Emporia	2	–	2	–	1	2	–	5	–	1
Ottawa	1	–	4	–	0	1	–	6	–	1
Bethany (KS)	0	–	5	–	0	1	–	8	–	0
+ – Conference co-champions

1934 Lone Star Conference football standings
	Conf.					Overall
Team	W		L		T	W		L		T
East Texas State $	4	–	0	–	0	8	–	0	–	0
North Texas State	2	–	2	–	0	5	–	4	–	0
Sam Houston State	2	–	2	–	0	3	–	4	–	2
Stephen F. Austin	1	–	2	–	1	3	–	3	–	2
Southwest Texas State	0	–	3	–	1	2	–	7	–	1
$ – Conference champion

1934 Michigan Intercollegiate Athletic Association football standings
	Conf.					Overall
Team	W		L		T	W		L		T
Kalamazoo +	2	–	1	–	1	3	–	3	–	1
Hope +	2	–	1	–	1	3	–	2	–	2
Alma	1	–	1	–	2	1	–	4	–	2
Albion	1	–	2	–	1	3	–	4	–	1
Hillsdale	1	–	2	–	1	2	–	5	–	1
$ – Conference champion

1934 Middle Atlantic Athletic Association football standings
	Conf.					Overall
Team	W		L		T	W		L		T
Delaware State $	7	–	0	–	0	8	–	0	–	0
Miner Teachers	2	–	1	–	0	5	–	1	–	0
Downingtown	1	–	1	–	2	1	–	1	–	2
Cheyney	2	–	2	–	0	2	–	5	–	0
Bordentown	2	–	3	–	0	3	–	3	–	0
Bowie	2	–	4	–	1	2	–	4	–	1
Storer	0	–	2	–	1	0	–	2	–	1
Princess Anne	0	–	3	–	0	0	–	3	–	0
$ – Conference champion

1934 Middle Three Conference football standings
	Conf.					Overall
Team	W		L		T	W		L		T
Rutgers $	2	–	0	–	0	5	–	3	–	1
Lehigh	1	–	1	–	0	4	–	4	–	0
Lafayette	0	–	2	–	0	2	–	6	–	0
$ – Conference champion

1934 Midwest Conference football standings
	Conf.					Overall
Team	W		L		T	W		L		T
Monmouth (IL) +	4	–	0	–	1	7	–	1	–	1
Coe +	3	–	0	–	1	5	–	1	–	2
Carleton	3	–	1	–	0	6	–	1	–	0
Lawrence	2	–	2	–	0	4	–	3	–	1
Beloit	2	–	2	–	1	3	–	3	–	1
Cornell (IA)	1	–	4	–	0	2	–	7	–	0
Ripon	0	–	2	–	1	0	–	5	–	2
Knox	0	–	4	–	0	0	–	8	–	0
+ – Conference co-champions

1934 Minnesota Intercollegiate Athletic Conference football standings
	Conf.					Overall
Team	W		L		T	W		L		T
Concordia (MN) $	4	–	0	–	0	7	–	1	–	1
St. Thomas (MN)	4	–	1	–	0	6	–	2	–	1
Hamline	3	–	1	–	0	3	–	2	–	0
Saint John's (MN)	2	–	1	–	1	5	–	1	–	1
St. Olaf	2	–	1	–	1	3	–	2	–	2
Saint Mary's (MN)	2	–	2	–	1	4	–	3	–	2
Macalester	1	–	3	–	1	1	–	5	–	1
Gustavus Adolphus	0	–	4	–	0	0	–	4	–	1
Augsburg	0	–	5	–	0	0	–	5	–	0
$ – Conference champion

1934 Missouri College Athletic Union football standings
	Conf.					Overall
Team	W		L		T	W		L		T
Central (MO) $	3	–	0	–	1	6	–	1	–	2
William Jewell	3	–	1	–	0	4	–	3	–	1
Tarkio	1	–	2	–	1	3	–	4	–	1
Culver–Stockton	1	–	3	–	0	3	–	5	–	0
Missouri Valley	1	–	3	–	0	1	–	7	–	2
$ – Conference champion

1934 Missouri Intercollegiate Athletic Association football standings
	Conf.					Overall
Team	W		L		T	W		L		T
Kirksville $	4	–	0	–	0	8	–	0	–	0
Cape Girardeau	3	–	1	–	0	8	–	1	–	0
Maryville (MO)	2	–	2	–	0	4	–	5	–	0
Springfield (MO)	1	–	3	–	0	1	–	5	–	1
Warrensburg	0	–	4	–	0	4	–	4	–	1
$ – Conference champion

1934 Missouri Valley Conference football standings
	Conf.					Overall
Team	W		L		T	W		L		T
Washington University $	1	–	0	–	0	7	–	3	–	0
Creighton	2	–	1	–	0	2	–	7	–	0
Oklahoma A&M	1	–	1	–	0	4	–	5	–	1
Drake	2	–	2	–	0	3	–	6	–	1
Grinnell	0	–	2	–	0	2	–	7	–	0
$ – Conference champion

1934 Mississippi Valley Conference football standings
	Conf.					Overall
Team	W		L		T	W		L		T
Bethel (TN) $	6	–	0	–	0	7	–	1	–	0
West Tennessee State Teachers	1	–	0	–	0	3	–	3	–	2
Tennessee Junior	2	–	1	–	0	7	–	1	–	0
Freed–Hardeman	2	–	2	–	0	2	–	3	–	0
Delta State	2	–	3	–	0	2	–	6	–	1
Sunflower Junior	1	–	2	–	1	1	–	3	–	1
Lambuth	1	–	4	–	1	1	–	8	–	1
Northwest Mississippi	0	–	3	–	0	0	–	3	–	0
$ – Conference champion

1934 Nebraska College Athletic Conference football standings
	Conf.					Overall
Team	W		L		T	W		L		T
Nebraska Wesleyan $	4	–	0	–	0	6	–	2	–	1
Hastings	3	–	1	–	0	7	–	2	–	0
Midland	2	–	2	–	0	3	–	4	–	0
Doane	1	–	3	–	0	3	–	5	–	0
York (NE)	0	–	4	–	0	5	–	5	–	0
$ – Conference champion

1934 Nebraska Intercollegiate Athletic Association football standings
	Conf.					Overall
Team	W		L		T	W		L		T
Omaha $	3	–	0	–	1	4	–	1	–	2
Chadron State	3	–	1	–	0	6	–	2	–	0
Peru State	2	–	2	–	0	5	–	3	–	0
Wayne State (NE)	1	–	2	–	1	2	–	4	–	2
Kearney State	0	–	4	–	0	1	–	7	–	0
$ – Conference champion

1934 New England Conference football standings
	Conf.					Overall
Team	W		L		T	W		L		T
New Hampshire $	1	–	0	–	0	3	–	4	–	2
Rhode Island State	2	–	1	–	0	6	–	3	–	0
Connecticut State	0	–	1	–	0	1	–	7	–	0
Maine	0	–	2	–	0	4	–	3	–	0
$ – Conference champion

1934 North Central Conference football standings
	Conf.					Overall
Team	W		L		T	W		L		T
North Dakota $	3	–	1	–	0	7	–	1	–	0
North Dakota Agricultural	2	–	1	–	1	5	–	3	–	2
Morningside	2	–	1	–	1	4	–	3	–	1
South Dakota State	2	–	2	–	0	6	–	4	–	0
South Dakota	0	–	4	–	0	2	–	7	–	0
$ – Conference champion

1934 North Dakota Intercollegiate Athletic Conference football standings
	Conf.					Overall
Team	W		L		T	W		L		T
Jamestown $	5	–	0	–	0	6	–	3	–	0
Wahpeton	3	–	1	–	0	4	–	3	–	0
Dickinson State	2	–	2	–	1	3	–	3	–	1
Valley City State	2	–	2	–	1	2	–	2	–	1
Mayville State	1	–	4	–	0	?	–	?	–	?
Ellendale	0	–	4	–	0	?	–	?	–	?
Minot State	2	–	1	–	0	5	–	2	–	0
$ – Conference champion

1934 North State Conference football standings
	Conf.					Overall
Team	W		L		T	W		L		T
Elon $	3	–	0	–	1	6	–	2	–	1
Catawba	2	–	0	–	2	5	–	2	–	3
Appalachian State *	1	–	0	–	0	3	–	4	–	1
Lenoir Rhyne	2	–	1	–	1	5	–	4	–	1
Guilford	1	–	3	–	0	2	–	7	–	0
Western Carolina	0	–	5	–	0	3	–	7	–	0
$ – Conference champion; * – Appalachian State was ineligible for championship because of limited conference schedule.

1934 Northern Teachers College Conference football standings
	Conf.					Overall
Team	W		L		T	W		L		T
Duluth State $	3	–	1	–	0	6	–	1	–	0
St. Cloud State	3	–	2	–	0	3	–	4	–	0
Moorhead State *	2	–	2	–	0	4	–	2	–	1
Mankato State	2	–	2	–	0	2	–	4	–	1
Winona State	2	–	2	–	0	2	–	5	–	0
Bemidji State	1	–	4	–	0	3	–	5	–	0
$ – Conference champion; * – forfeited victories over Duluth State and Winona State because of ineligible player

1934 Northwest Conference football standings
	Conf.					Overall
Team	W		L		T	W		L		T
Willamette +	5	–	0	–	0	8	–	1	–	0
College of Idaho +	4	–	0	–	0	8	–	1	–	0
Pacific (OR)	3	–	1	–	1	4	–	2	–	3
Puget Sound	2	–	2	–	1	3	–	5	–	1
Linfield	2	–	3	–	0	5	–	3	–	0
Whitman	0	–	5	–	0	1	–	6	–	0
Albany (OR)	0	–	5	–	0	0	–	9	–	0
+ – Conference co-champions

1934 Ohio Athletic Conference football standings
	Conf.					Overall
Team	W		L		T	W		L		T
Wooster $	8	–	0	–	0	8	–	1	–	0
Denison	6	–	0	–	1	6	–	1	–	1
Baldwin–Wallace	5	–	0	–	0	7	–	1	–	0
Ohio Northern	5	–	0	–	1	6	–	0	–	1
Xavier	2	–	0	–	0	6	–	2	–	1
Dayton	1	–	0	–	1	4	–	3	–	1
Toledo	4	–	1	–	0	5	–	3	–	0
Muskingum	4	–	2	–	1	5	–	3	–	1
Case	3	–	2	–	2	4	–	3	–	2
Mount Union	4	–	3	–	0	4	–	4	–	0
John Carroll	1	–	1	–	2	5	–	2	–	2
Akron	3	–	4	–	0	3	–	4	–	1
Heidelberg	3	–	4	–	0	3	–	5	–	0
Kent State	2	–	3	–	3	2	–	3	–	3
Bowling Green	2	–	3	–	2	2	–	3	–	2
Marietta	1	–	3	–	2	2	–	3	–	2
Capital	2	–	5	–	0	2	–	5	–	0
Hiram	2	–	5	–	0	2	–	5	–	0
Oberlin	1	–	3	–	1	2	–	5	–	1
Ashland	1	–	4	–	1	2	–	6	–	1
Wittenberg	1	–	5	–	0	2	–	7	–	0
Otterbein	1	–	6	–	0	2	–	7	–	0
Findlay	0	–	2	–	0	3	–	3	–	0
Kenyon	0	–	6	–	1	0	–	7	–	1
$ – Conference champion

1934 Oklahoma Collegiate Conference football standings
	Conf.					Overall
Team	W		L		T	W		L		T
Central State Teachers $	5	–	0	–	0	7	–	2	–	0
Northeastern State	3	–	2	–	0	4	–	5	–	0
Southwestern Oklahoma State	3	–	2	–	0	5	–	2	–	1
East Central	1	–	3	–	1	2	–	5	–	2
Southeastern Oklahoma State	1	–	3	–	1	2	–	6	–	1
Northwestern Oklahoma State	1	–	4	–	0	5	–	4	–	0
$ – Conference champion

1934 Pennsylvania State Teachers Conference football standings
	Conf.					Overall
Team	W		L		T	W		L		T
Indiana (PA) $	6	–	0	–	0	6	–	0	–	0
West Chester	2	–	0	–	0	4	–	4	–	0
Shippensburg	5	–	2	–	0	5	–	2	–	0
East Stroudsburg	2	–	1	–	0	4	–	2	–	1
California (PA)	3	–	2	–	1	4	–	2	–	1
Bloomsburg	4	–	3	–	1	4	–	3	–	1
Lock Haven	4	–	4	–	0	5	–	4	–	0
Slippery Rock	1	–	2	–	0	2	–	4	–	1
Clarion	1	–	2	–	2	1	–	4	–	2
Mansfield	1	–	3	–	1	3	–	4	–	1
Millersville	1	–	4	–	1	1	–	5	–	1
Kutztown	0	–	3	–	0	1	–	6	–	0
Edinboro	0	–	4	–	0	0	–	6	–	0
$ – Conference champion

1934 Smoky Mountain Conference football standings
	Conf.					Overall
Team	W		L		T	W		L		T
Milligan $	3	–	1	–	1	6	–	2	–	1
Tusculum	3	–	2	–	1	5	–	2	–	1
Cumberland (TN)	1	–	1	–	0	7	–	3	–	0
King	2	–	2	–	1	5	–	3	–	1
Carson–Newman	2	–	2	–	2	4	–	3	–	2
East Tennessee State Teachers	2	–	2	–	1	3	–	3	–	2
Maryville (TN)	2	–	3	–	0	4	–	6	–	0
Appalachian State	0	–	2	–	0	3	–	5	–	0
$ – Conference champion

1934 South Dakota Intercollegiate Conference football standings
	Conf.					Overall
Team	W		L		T	W		L		T
Huron +	5	–	0	–	0	5	–	0	–	0
Spearfish +	4	–	0	–	0	7	–	1	–	0
Augustana (SD) +	4	–	0	–	0	6	–	2	–	0
Sioux Falls	5	–	2	–	0	6	–	2	–	0
Yankton	3	–	3	–	0	4	–	4	–	0
South Dakota Mines	2	–	2	–	0	2	–	4	–	0
Southern Normal	1	–	3	–	1	1	–	3	–	2
Northern Normal	1	–	5	–	0	2	–	6	–	0
Eastern Normal	0	–	4	–	0	1	–	4	–	0
Dakota Wesleyan	0	–	6	–	1	0	–	7	–	1
+ – Conference co-champions; South Dakota Mines and Spearfish played twice. The second game was not counted in the conference standings.

1934 Southern California Conference football standings
	Conf.					Overall
Team	W		L		T	W		L		T
Whittier $	5	–	0	–	0	7	–	2	–	1
San Diego State	2	–	1	–	1	3	–	5	–	1
Occidental	2	–	2	–	0	3	–	5	–	1
Redlands	2	–	3	–	0	3	–	4	–	1
La Verne	1	–	2	–	1	4	–	3	–	1
Santa Barbara State	0	–	4	–	0	2	–	5	–	1
$ – Conference champion

1934 Southern Intercollegiate Athletic Association football standings
	Conf.					Overall
Team	W		L		T	W		L		T
Furman $	4	–	0	–	0	5	–	4	–	0
Union (KY)	4	–	0	–	1	5	–	0	–	2
Millsaps	4	–	0	–	2	7	–	1	–	2
Centenary	3	–	0	–	0	10	–	2	–	0
Rollins	3	–	0	–	0	5	–	3	–	0
Centre	4	–	1	–	0	5	–	5	–	0
Western Kentucky State Teachers	4	–	1	–	1	4	–	2	–	2
Loyola (LA)	3	–	1	–	0	4	–	5	–	0
The Citadel	3	–	1	–	0	3	–	5	–	1
Murray State	5	–	2	–	0	6	–	3	–	0
Miami (FL)	2	–	1	–	1	5	–	3	–	1
Mississippi College	4	–	2	–	0	5	–	4	–	0
Howard (AL)	2	–	1	–	1	3	–	4	–	2
Louisiana Normal	3	–	2	–	0	4	–	3	–	1
Presbyterian	3	–	2	–	1	3	–	4	–	2
Transylvania	3	–	3	–	0	3	–	5	–	0
Georgetown (KY)	2	–	2	–	1	2	–	6	–	1
Southwestern (TN)	1	–	1	–	1	3	–	6	–	1
SW Louisiana	2	–	3	–	0	4	–	5	–	0
Union (TN)	2	–	3	–	1	6	–	4	–	1
Wofford	2	–	3	–	1	4	–	4	–	1
Mississippi State Teachers	2	–	3	–	1	3	–	4	–	2
Louisville	2	–	3	–	0	2	–	5	–	0
Louisiana College	2	–	4	–	1	3	–	4	–	1
Middle Tennessee State Teachers	1	–	3	–	0	2	–	7	–	0
Mercer	1	–	4	–	0	3	–	6	–	1
Newberry	1	–	4	–	0	4	–	7	–	0
Tennessee Tech	1	–	4	–	0	3	–	5	–	1
Eastern Kentucky State Teachers	1	–	5	–	0	1	–	6	–	0
Stetson	0	–	2	–	1	2	–	4	–	1
Morehead State	0	–	4	–	0	2	–	4	–	0
Erskine	0	–	4	–	0	1	–	8	–	0
Louisiana Tech	0	–	5	–	0	4	–	6	–	0
$ – Conference champion

1934 Southern Intercollegiate Athletic Conference football standings
	Conf.					Overall
Team	W		L		T	W		L		T
Morris Brown $	5	–	0	–	2	7	–	1	–	2
Tuskegee	3	–	2	–	1	6	–	5	–	1
South Carolina State	2	–	1	–	1	5	–	2	–	1
Florida A&M	3	–	3	–	0	5	–	3	–	1
Alabama State	2	–	2	–	2	4	–	4	–	2
Talladega	3	–	0	–	1	4	–	0	–	1
Clark (GA)	1	–	3	–	2	3	–	4	–	2
Morehouse	3	–	3	–	2	4	–	3	–	2
LeMoyne	1	–	1	–	2	5	–	1	–	2
Benedict	0	–	2	–	2	2	–	2	–	3
Knoxville	1	–	3	–	1	2	–	4	–	1
Fisk	0	–	4	–	0	0	–	5	–	1
$ – Conference champion; Standings were based on Dickinson System ratings.

1934 Southwestern Athletic Conference football standings
	Conf.					Overall
Team	W		L		T	W		L		T
Texas College $	4	–	0	–	1	9	–	0	–	1
Langston	3	–	1	–	0	7	–	2	–	0
Southern	1	–	1	–	0	4	–	3	–	0
Prairie View	2	–	3	–	0	5	–	4	–	0
Wiley	1	–	2	–	1	5	–	4	–	1
Samuel Huston	0	–	4	–	0	?	–	?	–	?
Bishop	0	–	0	–	0	6	–	0	–	1
$ – Conference champion

1934 Texas Conference football standings
	Conf.					Overall
Team	W		L		T	W		L		T
Howard Payne $	5	–	0	–	1	9	–	0	–	1
St. Edward's	2	–	1	–	2	2	–	4	–	2
Daniel Baker	2	–	1	–	2	3	–	5	–	3
McMurry	2	–	1	–	3	3	–	3	–	3
Hardin–Simmons	2	–	2	–	1	3	–	5	–	2
Austin	2	–	4	–	2	3	–	5	–	2
Southwestern (TX)	2	–	4	–	1	3	–	5	–	2
Trinity (TX)	1	–	3	–	1	2	–	6	–	1
Abilene Christian	1	–	3	–	1	1	–	7	–	2
$ – Conference champion

1934 Tri-Normal Conference football standings
	Conf.					Overall
Team	W		L		T	W		L		T
Cheney Normal $	2	–	0	–	0	6	–	1	–	0
Bellingham Normal	0	–	1	–	1	2	–	2	–	3
Ellensburg Normal	0	–	1	–	1	3	–	3	–	2
$ – Conference champion

1934 Tri-State Intercollegiate Conference football standings
	Conf.					Overall
Team	W		L		T	W		L		T
Aurora +	3	–	1	–	0	5	–	2	–	2
Wartburg +	3	–	1	–	0	3	–	3	–	0
Northwestern (WI)	2	–	1	–	1	2	–	3	–	1
Mission House	1	–	1	–	2	1	–	3	–	2
Wisconsin Mines	1	–	3	–	1	1	–	3	–	1
Milton	1	–	4	–	0	2	–	4	–	0
+ – Conference co-champions

1934 Virginia Conference football standings
	Conf.					Overall
Team	W		L		T	W		L		T
Richmond +	2	–	1	–	0	8	–	1	–	0
William & Mary +	2	–	1	–	0	2	–	6	–	0
Emory and Henry	1	–	2	–	0	8	–	2	–	0
Roanoke	1	–	2	–	0	5	–	5	–	0
+ – Conference co-champions

1934 Wisconsin State Teachers College Conference football standings
	Conf.					Overall
Team	W		L		T	W		L		T
Northern Division
La Crosse State x	3	–	0	–	1	5	–	1	–	2
River Falls State	3	–	1	–	0	5	–	3	–	0
Superior State	1	–	1	–	2	2	–	3	–	3
Eau Claire State	1	–	2	–	1	5	–	2	–	1
Stout Institute	0	–	4	–	0	0	–	6	–	0
Southern Division
Stevens Point State x	4	–	0	–	0	7	–	1	–	0
Milwaukee State	3	–	1	–	0	3	–	4	–	1
Whitewater State	2	–	2	–	0	3	–	4	–	0
Oshkosh State	1	–	3	–	0	3	–	3	–	1
Platteville State	0	–	4	–	0	1	–	4	–	0
x – Division champion/co-champions

1934 West Virginia Athletic Conference football standings
	Conf.					Overall
Team	W		L		T	W		L		T
Fairmont State $	5	–	0	–	0	6	–	2	–	0
West Virginia Wesleyan	4	–	0	–	0	6	–	3	–	1
Morris Harvey	3	–	2	–	1	3	–	5	–	1
Salem	4	–	3	–	0	4	–	5	–	0
Concord	2	–	2	–	0	4	–	3	–	0
West Liberty State	2	–	3	–	2	3	–	4	–	2
Potomac State	2	–	4	–	0	4	–	4	–	0
Glenville State	1	–	4	–	1	1	–	5	–	1
New River State	0	–	4	–	0	0	–	5	–	0
Davis & Elkins *	1	–	1	–	0	4	–	5	–	1
Marshall *	1	–	1	–	0	3	–	6	–	0
Shepherd *	1	–	2	–	0	1	–	5	–	0
$ – Conference champion; * – Did not qualify for conference standings Ties did not count in conference standings.

=== Minor conference champions ===
Conference	Champion(s)	Record
Central Intercollegiate Athletics Association	Morgan College	5–0–3
Central Intercollegiate Athletic Conference	Kansas State Teachers–Hays	4–1–0
Far Western Conference	Fresno State Normal; San Jose State Teachers	3–0
Indiana Intercollegiate Conference	Butler	6–0
Iowa Intercollegiate Athletic Conference	Simpson	3–2–1
Kansas Collegiate Athletic Conference	Baker; Kansas Wesleyan	4–1
Lone Star Conference	East Texas State Teachers	4–0
Michigan Intercollegiate Athletic Association	Hope; Kalamazoo	2–1–1
Michigan-Ontario Collegiate Conference	Adrian	–
Middle Atlantic Athletic Association	Delaware State	6–0
Midwest Collegiate Athletic Conference	Coe; Monmouth (IL)	3–0–1
Minnesota Intercollegiate Athletic Conference	Concordia–Moorhead	4–0
Missouri Intercollegiate Athletic Association	Northeast Missouri State Teachers	4–0
Nebraska College Athletic Conference	Nebraska Wesleyan	4–0
Nebraska Intercollegiate Athletic Association	Omaha University	4–0
North Central Intercollegiate Athletic Conference	North Dakota	3–0
North Dakota College Athletic Conference	Jamestown College	5–0
Northern Teachers Athletic Conference	Moorhead State Teachers	4–0
Ohio Athletic Conference	College of Wooster	8–0
Oklahoma Collegiate Athletic Conference	Central State Teachers (OK)	5–0
Pacific Northwest Conference	Willamette	5–0
Pennsylvania State Athletic Conference	Indiana State Teachers	6–0
Southern California Intercollegiate Athletic Conference	Whittier	5–0
South Dakota Intercollegiate Conference	Augustana (SD)	3–1
Southern Intercollegiate Athletic Conference	Morris Brown	5—0–2
Southwestern Athletic Conference	Texas College	4–0–1
Texas Collegiate Athletic Conference	Howard Payne	5–0–1
Tri-Normal League	State Normal–Cheney	2–0
Wisconsin State Teachers College Conference	North: La Crosse State Teachers; South: Stevens Point State Teachers	3–0–1; 4–0

== Bowl games ==
Bowl game	Winning team		Losing team	
Rose Bowl	No. 6 Alabama	29	No. 10 Stanford	13
Sugar Bowl	No. 11 Tulane	20	Temple	14
Orange Bowl	Bucknell	26	Miami (FL)	0
Sun Bowl †	El Paso All-Stars	25	Ranger (Texas)	21

† played with non-collegiate teams

Rankings from the Dickinson System

In the first Sugar Bowl game, Tulane (9–1) hosted unbeaten Temple (7–0–2) before a crowd of 30,000 in New Orleans. Temple took a 14–0 lead before Tulane came back to win the game, 20–14. Temple had closed its season with a scoreless tie against Bucknell, which finished at 6–2–2, and the Bison were invited to play the Miami Hurricanes in the first Orange Bowl. The 'Canes best days were still ahead of them, and they made only three first downs altogether. Although 15,000 were expected, only 5,000 turned out to watch Bucknell beat Miami, 26–0.

The big game remained the Rose Bowl with Stanford, at 9–0–1, and Alabama, at 9–0. With both teams unbeaten, a crowd of 85,000 turned out in Pasadena to watch them. Stanford led 7–0 in the first quarter, but Alabama scored 22 points in the second, with the help of quarterback Dixie Howell and future Pro Football Hall of Fame Don Hutson, with Alabama winning, 29–14. The Sun Bowl was given a test drive with non-collegiate teams, as the El Paso All-Stars beating the visiting Ranger Bulldogs, 25–21, before a crowd of 3,000 in El Paso. In Honolulu, the Hawaii team beat vacationing California, 14–0, and in Houston, Tuskegee beat Prairie View, 15–6, in a New Year's Day game for HBCUs

== Awards and honors ==
=== All-Americans ===
The consensus 1934 College Football All-America Team included:

Position	Name	Height	Weight (lbs.)	Class	Hometown	Team
Quarterback	Bobby Grayson	5'11"	195	Jr.	Portland, Oregon	Stanford
Halfback	Dixie Howell	5'11"	164	Sr.	Hartford, Alabama	Alabama
Halfback	Buzz Borries	6'0"	175	Sr.	Louisville, Kentucky	Navy
Fullback	Pug Lund	5'11"	185	Sr.	Rice Lake, Wisconsin	Minnesota
End	Don Hutson	6'1"	183	Sr.	Pine Bluff, Arkansas	Alabama
Tackle	Bill Lee	6'2"	231	Sr.	Eutaw, Alabama	Alabama
Guard	Chuck Hartwig			Sr.	Wileyville, West Virginia	Pittsburgh
Center	Jack Robinson			Sr.	Long Island, New York	Notre Dame
Center	Darrell Lester	6'3"	218	Jr.	Jacksboro, Texas	TCU
Center	George Shotwell	6'2"	159	Sr.	Hanover Township, Pennsylvania	Pittsburgh
Guard	Bill Bevan			Sr.	St. Paul, Minnesota	Minnesota
Tackle	Bob Reynolds	6'4"	220	Jr.	Okmulgee, Oklahoma	Stanford
End	Frank Larson			Sr.	Duluth, Minnesota	Minnesota

=== Statistical leaders ===
- Points scored: Bill Shepherd, Western Maryland, 133
- Total offense: Dixie Howell, Alabama, 1,437
- Receptions: Don Hutson, Alabama, 19
