= 1934 Southwestern Lynx football team =

American college football season

1934 Southwestern Lynx football
- Conference: Dixie Conference, Southern Intercollegiate Athletic Association
- Record: 3–6–1 (1–3–1 Dixie, 1–1–1 SIAA)
- Head coach: Jimmy R. Haygood (4th season)

1934 Dixie Conference football standings
	Conf.					Overall
Team	W		L		T	W		L		T
Birmingham–Southern $	5	–	0	–	0	9	–	0	–	0
Chattanooga	3	–	0	–	1	4	–	3	–	1
Millsaps	2	–	1	–	1	7	–	1	–	2
Mississippi College	2	–	2	–	0	5	–	4	–	0
Centre	1	–	1	–	0	5	–	5	–	0
Southwestern (TN)	1	–	3	–	1	3	–	6	–	1
Howard (AL)	0	–	1	–	0	3	–	4	–	2
Mercer	0	–	2	–	1	3	–	6	–	1
Spring Hill	0	–	4	–	0	4	–	5	–	0
$ – Conference champion

1934 Southern Intercollegiate Athletic Association football standings
	Conf.					Overall
Team	W		L		T	W		L		T
Furman $	4	–	0	–	0	5	–	4	–	0
Union (KY)	4	–	0	–	1	5	–	0	–	2
Millsaps	4	–	0	–	2	7	–	1	–	2
Centenary	3	–	0	–	0	10	–	2	–	0
Rollins	3	–	0	–	0	5	–	3	–	0
Centre	4	–	1	–	0	5	–	5	–	0
Western Kentucky State Teachers	4	–	1	–	1	4	–	2	–	2
Loyola (LA)	3	–	1	–	0	4	–	5	–	0
The Citadel	3	–	1	–	0	3	–	5	–	1
Murray State	5	–	2	–	0	6	–	3	–	0
Miami (FL)	2	–	1	–	1	5	–	3	–	1
Mississippi College	4	–	2	–	0	5	–	4	–	0
Howard (AL)	2	–	1	–	1	3	–	4	–	2
Louisiana Normal	3	–	2	–	0	4	–	3	–	1
Presbyterian	3	–	2	–	1	3	–	4	–	2
Transylvania	3	–	3	–	0	3	–	5	–	0
Georgetown (KY)	2	–	2	–	1	2	–	6	–	1
Southwestern (TN)	1	–	1	–	1	3	–	6	–	1
SW Louisiana	2	–	3	–	0	4	–	5	–	0
Union (TN)	2	–	3	–	1	6	–	4	–	1
Wofford	2	–	3	–	1	4	–	4	–	1
Mississippi State Teachers	2	–	3	–	1	3	–	4	–	2
Louisville	2	–	3	–	0	2	–	5	–	0
Louisiana College	2	–	4	–	1	3	–	4	–	1
Middle Tennessee State Teachers	1	–	3	–	0	2	–	7	–	0
Mercer	1	–	4	–	0	3	–	6	–	1
Newberry	1	–	4	–	0	4	–	7	–	0
Tennessee Tech	1	–	4	–	0	3	–	5	–	1
Eastern Kentucky State Teachers	1	–	5	–	0	1	–	6	–	0
Stetson	0	–	2	–	1	2	–	4	–	1
Morehead State	0	–	4	–	0	2	–	4	–	0
Erskine	0	–	4	–	0	1	–	8	–	0
Louisiana Tech	0	–	5	–	0	4	–	6	–	0
$ – Conference champion

The 1934 Southwestern Lynx football team was an American football team that represented Southwestern University—now known as Rhodes College— as a member of the Dixie Conference and the Southern Intercollegiate Athletic Association (SIAA) in the 1934 college football season. Led by Jimmy R. Haygood in fourth and final season as head coach, the team compiled an overall record of 3–6–1 and with a mark of 1–3–1 in Dixie Conference play and 1–1–1 against SIAA competition.

== Schedule ==
Date	Opponent	Site	Result	Attendance	Source
September 29	Sewanee*	Fargason Field; Memphis, TN (rivalry)	W 2–0		
October 5	vs. Ole Miss*	Soldiers' Field; Clarksdale, MS	L 0–19	6,200	
October 13	at Mississippi College	State Fairgrounds; Jackson, MS	L 7–20	4,000	
October 20	Mississippi State*	Fargason Field; Memphis, TN	L 6–21		
October 27	at Chattanooga	Chamberlain Field; Chattanooga, TN	L 7–20		
November 3	Birmingham–Southern	Fargason Field; Memphis, TN	L 0–7		
November 10	Kentucky*	Fargason Field; Memphis, TN	L 0–33	2,000–3,000	
November 16	Millsaps	Fargason Field; Memphis, TN	T 0–0	1,000	
November 24	at Union (TN)	Jackson, TN	W 20–0		
November 29	at Spring Hill	Hartwell Field; Mobile, AL	W 7–6	5,000	
*Non-conference game
