= 1934 Indiana Indians football team =

American college football season

1934 Indiana Indians football

PSTC champion
- Conference: Pennsylvania State Teachers Conference
- Record: 6–0 (6–0 PSTC)
- Head coach: George P. Miller (8th season)
- Home stadium: College field

1934 Pennsylvania State Teachers Conference football standings
	Conf.					Overall
Team	W		L		T	W		L		T
Indiana (PA) $	6	–	0	–	0	6	–	0	–	0
West Chester	2	–	0	–	0	4	–	4	–	0
Shippensburg	5	–	2	–	0	5	–	2	–	0
East Stroudsburg	2	–	1	–	0	4	–	2	–	1
California (PA)	3	–	2	–	1	4	–	2	–	1
Bloomsburg	4	–	3	–	1	4	–	3	–	1
Lock Haven	4	–	4	–	0	5	–	4	–	0
Slippery Rock	1	–	2	–	0	2	–	4	–	1
Clarion	1	–	2	–	2	1	–	4	–	2
Mansfield	1	–	3	–	1	3	–	4	–	1
Millersville	1	–	4	–	1	1	–	5	–	1
Kutztown	0	–	3	–	0	1	–	6	–	0
Edinboro	0	–	4	–	0	0	–	6	–	0
$ – Conference champion

The 1934 Indiana Indians football team, also called the "Red and Slate" and the "Redmen", represented State Teachers College at Indiana—now known as Indiana University of Pennsylvania—as a member of the Pennsylvania State Teachers Conference (PSTC) during the 1934 college football season. Led by eighth-year head coach George P. Miller, the Indians compiled an overall record of 6–0 with an identical mark in conference play, winning the PSTC title.

== Schedule ==
Date	Time	Opponent	Site	Result	Attendance	Source
October 6	2:15 p.m.	Lock Haven	College field; Indiana, PA	W 13–6		
October 20		Edinboro^{†}	College field; Indiana, PA	W 33–0	4,000	
October 27		Bloomsburg	College field; Indiana, PA	W 14–2		
November 3		at Clarion	Clarion, PA	W 14–2		
November 10		California (PA)	College field; Indiana, PA (rivalry)	W 41–7		
November 17		at Shippensburg	Shippensburg, PA	W 13–0	3,000	
^{†}Homecoming; All times are in Eastern time
