= 1934 Southwestern Louisiana Bulldogs football team =

American college football season

1934 Southwestern Louisiana Bulldogs football
- Conference: Southern Intercollegiate Athletic Association
- Record: 5–4 (2–3 SIAA)
- Head coach: Truman F. Wilbanks (4th season)
- Home stadium: Campus Athletic Field

1934 Southern Intercollegiate Athletic Association football standings
| | Conf. | | | | | Overall |
| Team | W | | L | | T | W | | L | | T |
|---|---|---|---|---|---|---|---|---|---|---|
| Furman $ | 4 | – | 0 | – | 0 | 5 | – | 4 | – | 0 |
| Union (KY) | 4 | – | 0 | – | 1 | 5 | – | 0 | – | 2 |
| Millsaps | 4 | – | 0 | – | 2 | 7 | – | 1 | – | 2 |
| Centenary | 3 | – | 0 | – | 0 | 10 | – | 2 | – | 0 |
| Rollins | 3 | – | 0 | – | 0 | 5 | – | 3 | – | 0 |
| Centre | 4 | – | 1 | – | 0 | 5 | – | 5 | – | 0 |
| Western Kentucky State Teachers | 4 | – | 1 | – | 1 | 4 | – | 2 | – | 2 |
| Loyola (LA) | 3 | – | 1 | – | 0 | 4 | – | 5 | – | 0 |
| The Citadel | 3 | – | 1 | – | 0 | 3 | – | 5 | – | 1 |
| Murray State | 5 | – | 2 | – | 0 | 6 | – | 3 | – | 0 |
| Miami (FL) | 2 | – | 1 | – | 1 | 5 | – | 3 | – | 1 |
| Mississippi College | 4 | – | 2 | – | 0 | 5 | – | 4 | – | 0 |
| Howard (AL) | 2 | – | 1 | – | 1 | 3 | – | 4 | – | 2 |
| Louisiana Normal | 3 | – | 2 | – | 0 | 4 | – | 3 | – | 1 |
| Presbyterian | 3 | – | 2 | – | 1 | 3 | – | 4 | – | 2 |
| Transylvania | 3 | – | 3 | – | 0 | 3 | – | 5 | – | 0 |
| Georgetown (KY) | 2 | – | 2 | – | 1 | 2 | – | 6 | – | 1 |
| Southwestern (TN) | 1 | – | 1 | – | 1 | 3 | – | 6 | – | 1 |
| SW Louisiana | 2 | – | 3 | – | 0 | 4 | – | 5 | – | 0 |
| Union (TN) | 2 | – | 3 | – | 1 | 6 | – | 4 | – | 1 |
| Wofford | 2 | – | 3 | – | 1 | 4 | – | 4 | – | 1 |
| Mississippi State Teachers | 2 | – | 3 | – | 1 | 3 | – | 4 | – | 2 |
| Louisville | 2 | – | 3 | – | 0 | 2 | – | 5 | – | 0 |
| Louisiana College | 2 | – | 4 | – | 1 | 3 | – | 4 | – | 1 |
| Middle Tennessee State Teachers | 1 | – | 3 | – | 0 | 2 | – | 7 | – | 0 |
| Mercer | 1 | – | 4 | – | 0 | 3 | – | 6 | – | 1 |
| Newberry | 1 | – | 4 | – | 0 | 4 | – | 7 | – | 0 |
| Tennessee Tech | 1 | – | 4 | – | 0 | 3 | – | 5 | – | 1 |
| Eastern Kentucky State Teachers | 1 | – | 5 | – | 0 | 1 | – | 6 | – | 0 |
| Stetson | 0 | – | 2 | – | 1 | 2 | – | 4 | – | 1 |
| Morehead State | 0 | – | 4 | – | 0 | 2 | – | 4 | – | 0 |
| Erskine | 0 | – | 4 | – | 0 | 1 | – | 8 | – | 0 |
| Louisiana Tech | 0 | – | 5 | – | 0 | 4 | – | 6 | – | 0 |
$ – Conference champion

The 1934 Southwestern Louisiana Bulldogs football team was an American football team that represented the Southwestern Louisiana Institute of Liberal and Technical Learning (now known as the University of Louisiana at Lafayette) in the Southern Intercollegiate Athletic Association during the 1934 college football season. In their fourth year under head coach Truman F. Wilbanks, the team compiled a 5–4 record.

== Schedule ==
| Date | Time | Opponent | Site | Result | Source |
|---|---|---|---|---|---|
| September 28 | | at Millsaps | Alumni Field; Jackson, MS | L 2–19 | |
| October 5 | | at Spring Hill* | Mobile, AL | L 6–7 | |
| October 12 | | Louisiana Tech | Campus Athletic Field; Lafayette, LA (rivalry) | W 25–0 | |
| October 19 | | at Mississippi State Teachers | Faulkner Field; Hattiesburg, MS | L 6–12 | |
| October 26 | | Southeastern Louisiana* | Campus Athletic Field; Lafayette, LA (rivalry) | W 10–0 | |
| November 3 | | at Louisiana College | Alumni Field; Pineville, LA | L 7–12 | |
| November 9 | | Stephen F. Austin* | Campus Athletic Field; Lafayette, LA | W 39–13 | |
| November 16 | | vs. Sam Houston State* | Lake Charles H. S. Stadium; Lake Charles, LA | W 20–7 | |
| November 29 | 2:30 p.m. | Louisiana Normal^{†} | Campus Athletic Field; Lafayette, LA | W 6–0 | |
*Non-conference game; ^{†}Homecoming; All times are in Central time
