= 1934 Wofford Terriers football team =

American college football season

1934 Wofford Terriers football
- Conference: Southern Intercollegiate Athletic Association
- Record: 4–4–1 (2–3–1 SIAA)
- Head coach: Jules Carson (1st season)
- Home stadium: Snyder Field

1934 Southern Intercollegiate Athletic Association football standings
	Conf.					Overall
Team	W		L		T	W		L		T
Furman $	4	–	0	–	0	5	–	4	–	0
Union (KY)	4	–	0	–	1	5	–	0	–	2
Millsaps	4	–	0	–	2	7	–	1	–	2
Centenary	3	–	0	–	0	10	–	2	–	0
Rollins	3	–	0	–	0	5	–	3	–	0
Centre	4	–	1	–	0	5	–	5	–	0
Western Kentucky State Teachers	4	–	1	–	1	4	–	2	–	2
Loyola (LA)	3	–	1	–	0	4	–	5	–	0
The Citadel	3	–	1	–	0	3	–	5	–	1
Murray State	5	–	2	–	0	6	–	3	–	0
Miami (FL)	2	–	1	–	1	5	–	3	–	1
Mississippi College	4	–	2	–	0	5	–	4	–	0
Howard (AL)	2	–	1	–	1	3	–	4	–	2
Louisiana Normal	3	–	2	–	0	4	–	3	–	1
Presbyterian	3	–	2	–	1	3	–	4	–	2
Transylvania	3	–	3	–	0	3	–	5	–	0
Georgetown (KY)	2	–	2	–	1	2	–	6	–	1
Southwestern (TN)	1	–	1	–	1	3	–	6	–	1
SW Louisiana	2	–	3	–	0	4	–	5	–	0
Union (TN)	2	–	3	–	1	6	–	4	–	1
Wofford	2	–	3	–	1	4	–	4	–	1
Mississippi State Teachers	2	–	3	–	1	3	–	4	–	2
Louisville	2	–	3	–	0	2	–	5	–	0
Louisiana College	2	–	4	–	1	3	–	4	–	1
Middle Tennessee State Teachers	1	–	3	–	0	2	–	7	–	0
Mercer	1	–	4	–	0	3	–	6	–	1
Newberry	1	–	4	–	0	4	–	7	–	0
Tennessee Tech	1	–	4	–	0	3	–	5	–	1
Eastern Kentucky State Teachers	1	–	5	–	0	1	–	6	–	0
Stetson	0	–	2	–	1	2	–	4	–	1
Morehead State	0	–	4	–	0	2	–	4	–	0
Erskine	0	–	4	–	0	1	–	8	–	0
Louisiana Tech	0	–	5	–	0	4	–	6	–	0
$ – Conference champion

The 1934 Wofford Terriers football team represented Wofford College as a member of the Southern Intercollegiate Athletic Association (SIAA) during the 1934 college football season. Led by first-year head coach Jules Carson, the Terriers compiled an overall record of 4–4–1 with a mark of 2–3–1 in conference play, tying for 19th place in the SIAA.

== Schedule ==
Date	Time	Opponent	Site	Result	Attendance	Source
September 22		at Washington and Lee*	Wilson Field; Lexington, VA	L 0–19	3,500	
September 29		Furman	Snyder Field; Spartanburg, SC (rivalry)	L 0–13	3,000	
October 13		South Georgia State Teachers*	Snyder Field; Spartanburg, SC	W 32–0		
October 20		Erskine	Snyder Field; Spartanburg, SC	W 20–7		
October 26		at Miami (FL)	Moore Park; Miami, FL	L 14–42		
November 3		The Citadel^{†}	Snyder Field; Spartanburg, SC (rivalry)	L 7–18	5,000	
November 9		at Catawba*	Salisbury, NC	W 28–0		
November 16		Newberry	Snyder Field; Spartanburg, SC	W 27–12		
November 24	2:30 p.m.	at Presbyterian	Johnson Field; Clinton, SC	T 7–7	3,000	
*Non-conference game; ^{†}Homecoming; All times are in Eastern time
