= 1934 Louisiana Tech Bulldogs football team =

American college football season

1934 Louisiana Tech Bulldogs football
- Conference: Southern Intercollegiate Athletic Association
- Record: 4–6 (0–5 SIAA)
- Head coach: Eddie McLane (1st season)
- Captain: Ike Lowery
- Home stadium: Tech Stadium

1934 Southern Intercollegiate Athletic Association football standings
	Conf.					Overall
Team	W		L		T	W		L		T
Furman $	4	–	0	–	0	5	–	4	–	0
Union (KY)	4	–	0	–	1	5	–	0	–	2
Millsaps	4	–	0	–	2	7	–	1	–	2
Centenary	3	–	0	–	0	10	–	2	–	0
Rollins	3	–	0	–	0	5	–	3	–	0
Centre	4	–	1	–	0	5	–	5	–	0
Western Kentucky State Teachers	4	–	1	–	1	4	–	2	–	2
Loyola (LA)	3	–	1	–	0	4	–	5	–	0
The Citadel	3	–	1	–	0	3	–	5	–	1
Murray State	5	–	2	–	0	6	–	3	–	0
Miami (FL)	2	–	1	–	1	5	–	3	–	1
Mississippi College	4	–	2	–	0	5	–	4	–	0
Howard (AL)	2	–	1	–	1	3	–	4	–	2
Louisiana Normal	3	–	2	–	0	4	–	3	–	1
Presbyterian	3	–	2	–	1	3	–	4	–	2
Transylvania	3	–	3	–	0	3	–	5	–	0
Georgetown (KY)	2	–	2	–	1	2	–	6	–	1
Southwestern (TN)	1	–	1	–	1	3	–	6	–	1
SW Louisiana	2	–	3	–	0	4	–	5	–	0
Union (TN)	2	–	3	–	1	6	–	4	–	1
Wofford	2	–	3	–	1	4	–	4	–	1
Mississippi State Teachers	2	–	3	–	1	3	–	4	–	2
Louisville	2	–	3	–	0	2	–	5	–	0
Louisiana College	2	–	4	–	1	3	–	4	–	1
Middle Tennessee State Teachers	1	–	3	–	0	2	–	7	–	0
Mercer	1	–	4	–	0	3	–	6	–	1
Newberry	1	–	4	–	0	4	–	7	–	0
Tennessee Tech	1	–	4	–	0	3	–	5	–	1
Eastern Kentucky State Teachers	1	–	5	–	0	1	–	6	–	0
Stetson	0	–	2	–	1	2	–	4	–	1
Morehead State	0	–	4	–	0	2	–	4	–	0
Erskine	0	–	4	–	0	1	–	8	–	0
Louisiana Tech	0	–	5	–	0	4	–	6	–	0
$ – Conference champion

The 1934 Louisiana Tech Bulldogs football team was an American football team that represented the Louisiana Polytechnic Institute (now known as Louisiana Tech University) as a member of the Southern Intercollegiate Athletic Association during the 1934 college football season. In their first year under head coach Eddie McLane, the team compiled a 4–6 record.

== Schedule ==
Date	Time	Opponent	Site	Result	Attendance	Source
September 21		Holmes*	Tech Stadium; Ruston, LA	W 7–0		
September 28		Magnolia A&M*	Tech Stadium; Ruston, LA	W 7–0		
October 5		at Henderson State*	Arkadelphia, AR	L 0–27		
October 12		at Southwestern Louisiana	Campus Athletic Field; Lafayette, LA (rivalry)	L 0–25		
October 20		Lambuth*	Tech Stadium; Ruston, LA	W 42–0		
October 27	3:00 p.m.	at Louisiana Normal	Normalite Field; Natchitoches, LA (rivalry)	L 0–6	4,000	
November 3		Millsaps	Tech Stadium; Ruston, LA	L 7–13		
November 10		at Mississippi College	Vicksburg Fairgrounds; Vicksburg, MS	L 0–32		
November 17		Delta State*	Tech Stadium; Ruston, LA	W 26–0		
November 24		Louisiana College	Tech Stadium; Ruston, LA	L 0–13		
*Non-conference game; All times are in Central time
