= 1934 Birmingham–Southern Panthers football team =

American college football season

1934 Birmingham–Southern Panthers football

Dixie champion
- Conference: Dixie Conference
- Record: 9–0 (5–0 Dixie)
- Head coach: Jenks Gillem (7th season)

1934 Dixie Conference football standings
	Conf.					Overall
Team	W		L		T	W		L		T
Birmingham–Southern $	5	–	0	–	0	9	–	0	–	0
Chattanooga	3	–	0	–	1	4	–	3	–	1
Millsaps	2	–	1	–	1	7	–	1	–	2
Mississippi College	2	–	2	–	0	5	–	4	–	0
Centre	1	–	1	–	0	5	–	5	–	0
Southwestern (TN)	1	–	3	–	1	3	–	6	–	1
Howard (AL)	0	–	1	–	0	3	–	4	–	2
Mercer	0	–	2	–	1	3	–	6	–	1
Spring Hill	0	–	4	–	0	4	–	5	–	0
$ – Conference champion

The 1934 Birmingham–Southern Panthers football team was an American football team that represented Birmingham–Southern College as a member of the Dixie Conference during the 1934 college football season. In Jenks Gillem's seventh season as head coach, the team compiled a record of 9–0 overall with a mark of 5–0 in conference play, winning the Dixie Conference title.

== Schedule ==
Date	Opponent	Site	Result	Attendance	Source
September 21	at Auburn*	Cramton Bowl; Montgomery, AL	W 7–0		
September 28	Loyola (LA)*	Legion Field; Birmingham, AL	W 19–2		
October 13	Mercer	Legion Field; Birmingham, AL	W 14–0		
October 19	Millsaps	Legion Field; Birmingham, AL	W 28–13		
October 27	at Murray State*	College Stadium; Murray, KY	W 20–7	4,200	
November 3	at Southwestern (TN)	Fargason Field; Memphis, TN	W 7–0		
November 10	at Tampa*	Plant Field; Tampa, FL	W 13–12		
November 17	at Spring Hill	Mobile, AL	W 14–0		
November 24	vs. Howard (AL)	Legion Field; Birmingham, AL	W 12–0	13,512	
*Non-conference game
