= 1934 Millsaps Majors football team =

American college football season

1934 Millsaps Majors football
- Conference: Dixie Conference, Southern Intercollegiate Athletic Association
- Record: 7–1–2 (2–1–1 Dixie, 4–0–2 SIAA)
- Head coach: Tranny Lee Gaddy (3rd season)
- Home stadium: Alumni Field

1934 Dixie Conference football standings
	Conf.					Overall
Team	W		L		T	W		L		T
Birmingham–Southern $	5	–	0	–	0	9	–	0	–	0
Chattanooga	3	–	0	–	1	4	–	3	–	1
Millsaps	2	–	1	–	1	7	–	1	–	2
Mississippi College	2	–	2	–	0	5	–	4	–	0
Centre	1	–	1	–	0	5	–	5	–	0
Southwestern (TN)	1	–	3	–	1	3	–	6	–	1
Howard (AL)	0	–	1	–	0	3	–	4	–	2
Mercer	0	–	2	–	1	3	–	6	–	1
Spring Hill	0	–	4	–	0	4	–	5	–	0
$ – Conference champion

1934 Southern Intercollegiate Athletic Association football standings
	Conf.					Overall
Team	W		L		T	W		L		T
Furman $	4	–	0	–	0	5	–	4	–	0
Union (KY)	4	–	0	–	1	5	–	0	–	2
Millsaps	4	–	0	–	2	7	–	1	–	2
Centenary	3	–	0	–	0	10	–	2	–	0
Rollins	3	–	0	–	0	5	–	3	–	0
Centre	4	–	1	–	0	5	–	5	–	0
Western Kentucky State Teachers	4	–	1	–	1	4	–	2	–	2
Loyola (LA)	3	–	1	–	0	4	–	5	–	0
The Citadel	3	–	1	–	0	3	–	5	–	1
Murray State	5	–	2	–	0	6	–	3	–	0
Miami (FL)	2	–	1	–	1	5	–	3	–	1
Mississippi College	4	–	2	–	0	5	–	4	–	0
Howard (AL)	2	–	1	–	1	3	–	4	–	2
Louisiana Normal	3	–	2	–	0	4	–	3	–	1
Presbyterian	3	–	2	–	1	3	–	4	–	2
Transylvania	3	–	3	–	0	3	–	5	–	0
Georgetown (KY)	2	–	2	–	1	2	–	6	–	1
Southwestern (TN)	1	–	1	–	1	3	–	6	–	1
SW Louisiana	2	–	3	–	0	4	–	5	–	0
Union (TN)	2	–	3	–	1	6	–	4	–	1
Wofford	2	–	3	–	1	4	–	4	–	1
Mississippi State Teachers	2	–	3	–	1	3	–	4	–	2
Louisville	2	–	3	–	0	2	–	5	–	0
Louisiana College	2	–	4	–	1	3	–	4	–	1
Middle Tennessee State Teachers	1	–	3	–	0	2	–	7	–	0
Mercer	1	–	4	–	0	3	–	6	–	1
Newberry	1	–	4	–	0	4	–	7	–	0
Tennessee Tech	1	–	4	–	0	3	–	5	–	1
Eastern Kentucky State Teachers	1	–	5	–	0	1	–	6	–	0
Stetson	0	–	2	–	1	2	–	4	–	1
Morehead State	0	–	4	–	0	2	–	4	–	0
Erskine	0	–	4	–	0	1	–	8	–	0
Louisiana Tech	0	–	5	–	0	4	–	6	–	0
$ – Conference champion

The 1934 Millsaps Majors football team was an American football team that represented Millsaps College as a member of the Dixie Conference and the Southern Intercollegiate Athletic Association (SIAA) in the 1934 college football season. Led by Tranny Lee Gaddy in his third season as head coach, the team compiled an overall record of 7–1–2 and with a mark of 2–1–1 in Dixie Conference play and 4–0–2 against SIAA competition.

== Schedule ==
Date	Opponent	Site	Result	Attendance	Source
September 21	Delta State*	Alumni Field; Jackson, MS	W 21–0		
September 28	Southwestern Louisiana	Alumni Field; Jackson, MS	W 19–2		
October 5	at Mississippi State*	Scott Field; Starkville, MS	W 7–6		
October 12	Murray State	Alumni Field; Jackson, MS	W 7–6	4,000	
October 19	at Birmingham–Southern	Legion Field; Birmingham, AL	L 13–28		
October 27	at Mississippi State Teachers	Faulkner Field; Hattiesburg, MS	T 0–0		
November 3	at Louisiana Tech	Tech Stadium; Ruston, LA	W 13–7		
November 9	Spring Hill	Alumni Field; Jackson, MS	W 9–7		
November 17	at Southwestern (TN)	Fargason Field; Memphis, TN	T 0–0	1,000	
November 29	vs. Mississippi College	Municipal Stadium; Jackson, MS (rivalry)	W 13–0		
*Non-conference game
