= 1934 Mississippi State Teachers Yellow Jackets football team =

American college football season

1934 Mississippi State Teachers Yellow Jackets football
- Conference: Southern Intercollegiate Athletic Association
- Record: 3–4–2 (2–3–1 SIAA)
- Head coach: Pooley Hubert (4th season)
- Home stadium: Faulkner Field

1934 Southern Intercollegiate Athletic Association football standings
	Conf.					Overall
Team	W		L		T	W		L		T
Furman $	4	–	0	–	0	5	–	4	–	0
Union (KY)	4	–	0	–	1	5	–	0	–	2
Millsaps	4	–	0	–	2	7	–	1	–	2
Centenary	3	–	0	–	0	10	–	2	–	0
Rollins	3	–	0	–	0	5	–	3	–	0
Centre	4	–	1	–	0	5	–	5	–	0
Western Kentucky State Teachers	4	–	1	–	1	4	–	2	–	2
Loyola (LA)	3	–	1	–	0	4	–	5	–	0
The Citadel	3	–	1	–	0	3	–	5	–	1
Murray State	5	–	2	–	0	6	–	3	–	0
Miami (FL)	2	–	1	–	1	5	–	3	–	1
Mississippi College	4	–	2	–	0	5	–	4	–	0
Howard (AL)	2	–	1	–	1	3	–	4	–	2
Louisiana Normal	3	–	2	–	0	4	–	3	–	1
Presbyterian	3	–	2	–	1	3	–	4	–	2
Transylvania	3	–	3	–	0	3	–	5	–	0
Georgetown (KY)	2	–	2	–	1	2	–	6	–	1
Southwestern (TN)	1	–	1	–	1	3	–	6	–	1
SW Louisiana	2	–	3	–	0	4	–	5	–	0
Union (TN)	2	–	3	–	1	6	–	4	–	1
Wofford	2	–	3	–	1	4	–	4	–	1
Mississippi State Teachers	2	–	3	–	1	3	–	4	–	2
Louisville	2	–	3	–	0	2	–	5	–	0
Louisiana College	2	–	4	–	1	3	–	4	–	1
Middle Tennessee State Teachers	1	–	3	–	0	2	–	7	–	0
Mercer	1	–	4	–	0	3	–	6	–	1
Newberry	1	–	4	–	0	4	–	7	–	0
Tennessee Tech	1	–	4	–	0	3	–	5	–	1
Eastern Kentucky State Teachers	1	–	5	–	0	1	–	6	–	0
Stetson	0	–	2	–	1	2	–	4	–	1
Morehead State	0	–	4	–	0	2	–	4	–	0
Erskine	0	–	4	–	0	1	–	8	–	0
Louisiana Tech	0	–	5	–	0	4	–	6	–	0
$ – Conference champion

The 1934 Mississippi State Teachers Yellow Jackets football team was an American football team that represented the Mississippi State Teachers College (now known as the University of Southern Mississippi) as a member of the Southern Intercollegiate Athletic Association during the 1934 college football season. In their fourth year under head coach Pooley Hubert, the team compiled a 3–4–2 record.

== Schedule ==
Date	Time	Opponent	Site	Result	Source
September 28		Poplarville Junior College*	Faulkner Field; Hattiesburg, MS	W 20–12	
October 6		at Mississippi College	Provine Field; Clinton, MS	L 0–12	
October 12		at Delta State*	Delta Field; Cleveland, MS	T 13–13	
October 20		Southwestern Louisiana	Faulkner Field; Hattiesburg, MS	W 12–6	
October 27		Millsaps	Faulkner Field; Hattiesburg, MS	T 0–0	
November 2		Spring Hill*^{†}	Faulkner Field; Hattiesburg, MS	L 0–7	
November 9	8:15 p.m.	at Louisiana Normal	Normalite Field; Natchitoches, LA	L 0–31	
November 17		Union (TN)	Faulkner Field; Hattiesburg, MS	L 6–26	
November 29		Murray State	Faulkner Field; Hattiesburg, MS	W 12–2	
*Non-conference game; ^{†}Homecoming; All times are in Central time
