= 1935 Orange Bowl =

American college football game

- Inaugural Orange Bowl
Bucknell Bison	Miami Hurricanes
(7–2–2)	(5–2–1)
Independent	SIAA
26	0
Head coach: Edward Mylin	Head coach: Tom McCann
	1	2	3	4	Total
Bucknell	0	7	6	13	26
Miami	0	0	0	0	0
- Date: January 1, 1935
- Season: 1934
- Stadium: Miami Field
- Location: Miami, Florida
- Referee: William Harkness
- Attendance: 5,134

The 1935 Orange Bowl was an American college football bowl game between the Bucknell Bison and Miami Hurricanes. Bucknell won the game, 26–0. It was the first edition of the Orange Bowl and kicked off at 2:30 pm at Miami Field in Miami on January 1, 1935, with about 5,000 in attendance. Miami Field was located on the same site as the Orange Bowl stadium, which was built in 1937.

The Bison defense held Miami to just four first downs and 28 yards total offense en route to the victory. The Bucknell offense gained 278 yards and earned its sixth shutout of the season.
