= 1934 Western Kentucky State Teachers Hilltoppers football team =

American college football season

1934 Western Kentucky State Teachers Hilltoppers football
- Conference: Southern Intercollegiate Athletic Association
- Record: 4–2–2 (4–1–1 SIAA)
- Head coach: Carl Anderson (2nd season)

1934 Southern Intercollegiate Athletic Association football standings
	Conf.					Overall
Team	W		L		T	W		L		T
Furman $	4	–	0	–	0	5	–	4	–	0
Union (KY)	4	–	0	–	1	5	–	0	–	2
Millsaps	4	–	0	–	2	7	–	1	–	2
Centenary	3	–	0	–	0	10	–	2	–	0
Rollins	3	–	0	–	0	5	–	3	–	0
Centre	4	–	1	–	0	5	–	5	–	0
Western Kentucky State Teachers	4	–	1	–	1	4	–	2	–	2
Loyola (LA)	3	–	1	–	0	4	–	5	–	0
The Citadel	3	–	1	–	0	3	–	5	–	1
Murray State	5	–	2	–	0	6	–	3	–	0
Miami (FL)	2	–	1	–	1	5	–	3	–	1
Mississippi College	4	–	2	–	0	5	–	4	–	0
Howard (AL)	2	–	1	–	1	3	–	4	–	2
Louisiana Normal	3	–	2	–	0	4	–	3	–	1
Presbyterian	3	–	2	–	1	3	–	4	–	2
Transylvania	3	–	3	–	0	3	–	5	–	0
Georgetown (KY)	2	–	2	–	1	2	–	6	–	1
Southwestern (TN)	1	–	1	–	1	3	–	6	–	1
SW Louisiana	2	–	3	–	0	4	–	5	–	0
Union (TN)	2	–	3	–	1	6	–	4	–	1
Wofford	2	–	3	–	1	4	–	4	–	1
Mississippi State Teachers	2	–	3	–	1	3	–	4	–	2
Louisville	2	–	3	–	0	2	–	5	–	0
Louisiana College	2	–	4	–	1	3	–	4	–	1
Middle Tennessee State Teachers	1	–	3	–	0	2	–	7	–	0
Mercer	1	–	4	–	0	3	–	6	–	1
Newberry	1	–	4	–	0	4	–	7	–	0
Tennessee Tech	1	–	4	–	0	3	–	5	–	1
Eastern Kentucky State Teachers	1	–	5	–	0	1	–	6	–	0
Stetson	0	–	2	–	1	2	–	4	–	1
Morehead State	0	–	4	–	0	2	–	4	–	0
Erskine	0	–	4	–	0	1	–	8	–	0
Louisiana Tech	0	–	5	–	0	4	–	6	–	0
$ – Conference champion

The 1934 Western Kentucky State Teachers Hilltoppers football team represented Western Kentucky State Teachers College (now known as Western Kentucky University) in the 1934 college football season. They were coached by Carl Anderson.

== Schedule ==
Date	Opponent	Site	Result	Attendance	Source
October 6	West Tennessee State Teachers	Bowling Green, KY	T 0–0		
October 13	Tennessee Tech	Bowling Green, KY	W 27–0		
October 20	Transylvania	Bowling Green, KY	W 20–0		
October 26	at Middle Tennessee State Teachers	Murfreesboro, TN (rivalry)	W 14–0		
November 3	Howard (AL)^{†}	Bowling Green, KY	T 0–0		
November 10	at Eastern Kentucky	Richmond, KY (rivalry)	W 47–9		
November 17	at Murray State	Cutchin Stadium; Murray, KY (rivalry)	L 14–27	5,000	
November 29	at Western State Teachers	Kalamazoo, MI	L 6–7		
^{†}Homecoming
