= 1934 Louisiana Normal Demons football team =

American college football season

1934 Louisiana Normal Demons football
- Conference: Southern Intercollegiate Athletic Association
- Record: 4–3–1 (3–2 SIAA)
- Head coach: Harry Turpin (1st season)
- Home stadium: Normalite Field

1934 Southern Intercollegiate Athletic Association football standings
	Conf.					Overall
Team	W		L		T	W		L		T
Furman $	4	–	0	–	0	5	–	4	–	0
Union (KY)	4	–	0	–	1	5	–	0	–	2
Millsaps	4	–	0	–	2	7	–	1	–	2
Centenary	3	–	0	–	0	10	–	2	–	0
Rollins	3	–	0	–	0	5	–	3	–	0
Centre	4	–	1	–	0	5	–	5	–	0
Western Kentucky State Teachers	4	–	1	–	1	4	–	2	–	2
Loyola (LA)	3	–	1	–	0	4	–	5	–	0
The Citadel	3	–	1	–	0	3	–	5	–	1
Murray State	5	–	2	–	0	6	–	3	–	0
Miami (FL)	2	–	1	–	1	5	–	3	–	1
Mississippi College	4	–	2	–	0	5	–	4	–	0
Howard (AL)	2	–	1	–	1	3	–	4	–	2
Louisiana Normal	3	–	2	–	0	4	–	3	–	1
Presbyterian	3	–	2	–	1	3	–	4	–	2
Transylvania	3	–	3	–	0	3	–	5	–	0
Georgetown (KY)	2	–	2	–	1	2	–	6	–	1
Southwestern (TN)	1	–	1	–	1	3	–	6	–	1
SW Louisiana	2	–	3	–	0	4	–	5	–	0
Union (TN)	2	–	3	–	1	6	–	4	–	1
Wofford	2	–	3	–	1	4	–	4	–	1
Mississippi State Teachers	2	–	3	–	1	3	–	4	–	2
Louisville	2	–	3	–	0	2	–	5	–	0
Louisiana College	2	–	4	–	1	3	–	4	–	1
Middle Tennessee State Teachers	1	–	3	–	0	2	–	7	–	0
Mercer	1	–	4	–	0	3	–	6	–	1
Newberry	1	–	4	–	0	4	–	7	–	0
Tennessee Tech	1	–	4	–	0	3	–	5	–	1
Eastern Kentucky State Teachers	1	–	5	–	0	1	–	6	–	0
Stetson	0	–	2	–	1	2	–	4	–	1
Morehead State	0	–	4	–	0	2	–	4	–	0
Erskine	0	–	4	–	0	1	–	8	–	0
Louisiana Tech	0	–	5	–	0	4	–	6	–	0
$ – Conference champion

The 1934 Louisiana Normal Demons football team represented the Louisiana State Normal College—now known as Northwestern State University—as a member the Southern Intercollegiate Athletic Association (SIAA) during the 1934 college football season. Led by first-year head coach Harry Turpin, the Demons compiled an overall record of 4–3–1 with a mark of 3–2 in conference play.

== Schedule ==
Date	Time	Opponent	Site	Result	Attendance	Source
September 22	3:00 p.m.	at Centenary	Centenary Stadium; Shreveport, LA	L 0–16	5,000	
September 28		East Texas State*	Normalite Field; Natchitoches, LA	L 0–14		
October 13	8:00 p.m.	at Louisiana College	Alumni Field; Pineville, LA	W 7–0	5,000	
October 19	8:00 p.m.	Lon Morris*	Normalite Field; Natchitoches, LA	W 6–0	2,000	
October 27	3:00 p.m.	Louisiana Tech^{†}	Normalite Field; Natchitoches, LA (rivalry)	W 6–0	4,000	
November 2	3:00 p.m.	at Stephen F. Austin*	Birdwell Field; Nacogdoches, TX (rivalry)	T 0–0		
November 9	8:15 p.m.	Mississippi State Teachers	Normalite Field; Natchitoches, LA	W 31–0		
November 29	2:30 p.m.	at Southwestern Louisiana	Campus Athletic Field; Lafayette, LA	L 0–6		
*Non-conference game; ^{†}Homecoming; All times are in Central time
