= Loyola University Stadium =

Stadium in New Orleans, Louisiana

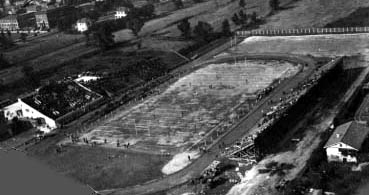
- Aerial view of the stadium, 1924
- Interactive map of Loyola University Stadium
- Address: Freret St; New Orleans; United States
- Coordinates: 29.936053°N 90.120296°W
- Owner: Loyola University New Orleans
- Operator: Loyola University Athletics
- Type: Stadium
- Surface: Grass
- Current use: Football

Construction
- Opened: 1928
- Closed: 1939; 87 years ago
- Demolished: 1939

Tenants
- Loyola Wolf Pack (NCAA) teams: football, track and field

Loyola University Stadium was an American football stadium in New Orleans. It was home to the Loyola University Wolf Pack football and track and field teams. The stadium opened in 1928.

The stadium was a double-decker stadium with a track surrounding the grass playing field. It was located on Freret Street at Calhoun Street between Bobet Hall and the gymnasium. It hosted the first collegiate night game in the southern United States.

The stadium also hosted high school football games.

When the university closed its football program in 1939, the stadium was demolished soon after.

== See also ==
- Loyola Wolf Pack
