= 1934 Notre Dame Fighting Irish football team =

American college football season

1934 Notre Dame Fighting Irish football
- Conference: Independent
- Record: 6–3
- Head coach: Elmer Layden (1st season)
- Captain: Dominic Vairo
- Home stadium: Notre Dame Stadium

1934 Midwestern college football independents records
	Conf.			Overall
Team	W	L	T	W		L		T
Michigan State		–		8	–	1	–	0
Wayne		–		7	–	1	–	0
Western State Teachers (MI)		–		7	–	1	–	0
Michigan State Normal		–		5	–	2	–	0
Notre Dame		–		6	–	3	–	0
Central State (MI)		–		5	–	3	–	0
Detroit		–		5	–	3	–	1
DePaul		–		4	–	3	–	0
Saint Louis		–		3	–	3	–	2
Marquette		–		4	–	5	–	0
Michigan Tech		–		1	–	2	–	1
Haskell		–		3	–	6	–	1
Missouri Mines		–		2	–	6	–	0
Wittenberg		–		2	–	7	–	0

The 1934 Notre Dame Fighting Irish football team was an American football team that represented the University of Notre Dame as an independent during the 1934 college football season. Following a losing season in 1933, Notre Dame in January 1934 hired Elmer Layden as its head football coach. In its first season under Layden, the team compiled a 6–3 record and outscored opponents by a total of 108 to 56. The team lost to Texas, Pittsburgh, and Navy, and ended the season with three consecutive victories over rivals Northwestern, Army, and USC.

Notre Dame center Jack Robinson was a consensus pick on the 1934 All-America college football team. Right end Dominic Vairo was the team captain.

The team played its home games at Notre Dame Stadium in Notre Dame, Indiana.

== Schedule ==
Date	Opponent	Site	Result	Attendance	Source
October 6	Texas	Notre Dame Stadium; Notre Dame, IN	L 6–7	20,353–33,000	
October 13	Purdue	Notre Dame Stadium; Notre Dame, IN (rivalry)	W 18–7	34,263	
October 20	Carnegie Tech	Notre Dame Stadium; Notre Dame, IN	W 13–0	11,242	
October 27	Wisconsin	Notre Dame Stadium; Notre Dame, IN	W 19–0	25,354	
November 3	at Pittsburgh	Pitt Stadium; Pittsburgh, PA (rivalry)	L 0–19	56,556–64,000	
November 10	vs. Navy	Municipal Stadium; Cleveland, OH (rivalry)	L 6–10	54,571	
November 17	at Northwestern	Dyche Stadium; Evanston, IL (rivalry)	W 20–7	38,413–45,000	
November 24	vs. Army	Yankee Stadium; Bronx, NY (rivalry)	W 12–6	78,757	
December 8	at USC	Memorial Coliseum; Los Angeles, CA (rivalry)	W 14–0	45,568	

== Personnel ==
=== Players ===
- Harry Becker, right tackle
- Bud Bonar, quarterback
- Frank Carideo, fullback
- Don Elser, fullback
- Wally Fromhart, quarterback
- Dan Hanley, right halfback
- Mike Layden, right halfback
- George Melinkovich, right halfback
- John Michuta, right tackle
- Wayne Millner, left end
- Andy Pilney, left halfback
- Jack Robinson, center
- Rocco Schiralli, left guard
- Paul Schrenker, right guard
- William Shakespeare, left halfback
- W. Smith, right guard
- Fred Solari, center
- Joseph Sullivan, left tackle
- Dominic Vairo, captain and right end

=== Coaching staff ===
- Head coach: Elmer Layden
- Assistant coaches: Joe Boland (line), Chet Grant (backfield), Tom Conley (ends).
