= 1933 Kent State Golden Flashes football team =

American college football season

1933 Kent State Golden Flashes football
- Conference: Ohio Athletic Conference
- Record: 2–2–3 (2–2–3 OAC)
- Head coach: Joe Begala (1st season)
- Home stadium: Rockwell Field

1933 Ohio Athletic Conference football standings
	Conf.					Overall
Team	W		L		T	W		L		T
Dayton $	3	–	0	–	1	8	–	2	–	1
Wooster	7	–	1	–	1	7	–	1	–	1
Akron	5	–	2	–	1	5	–	3	–	1
Case	5	–	2	–	0	5	–	3	–	1
Muskingum	4	–	2	–	1	5	–	2	–	1
Baldwin–Wallace	4	–	2	–	1	5	–	3	–	1
Toledo	3	–	2	–	1	5	–	2	–	1
John Carroll	3	–	2	–	2	5	–	2	–	2
Hiram	2	–	2	–	2	2	–	2	–	3
Kent State	2	–	2	–	3	2	–	2	–	3
Otterbein	3	–	4	–	1	3	–	4	–	1
Mount Union	3	–	4	–	1	3	–	5	–	1
Marietta	2	–	3	–	1	3	–	3	–	1
Heidelberg	2	–	3	–	2	2	–	5	–	2
Denison	2	–	3	–	1	2	–	6	–	1
Oberlin	2	–	3	–	0	4	–	4	–	0
Ashland	2	–	4	–	1	3	–	4	–	1
Bowling Green	1	–	3	–	2	2	–	3	–	2
Capital	1	–	4	–	2	1	–	4	–	2
Ohio Northern	0	–	4	–	1	0	–	5	–	2
Kenyon	0	–	5	–	1	1	–	5	–	1
Xavier *	1	–	0	–	0	5	–	4	–	0
$ – Conference champion; * – did not compete for championship

The 1933 Kent State Golden Flashes football team was an American football team that represented Kent State College (later renamed Kent State University) in the Ohio Athletic Conference (OAC) during the 1933 college football season. In its first season under head coach Joe Begala, Kent State compiled a 2–2–3 record.

== Schedule ==
Date	Opponent	Site	Result	Source
September 29	at Muskingum	New Concord, OH	L 0–12	
October 7	Akron	Rockwell Field; Kent, OH (rivalry)	L 6–19	
October 14	Capital	Rockwell Field; Kent, OH	W 13–0	
October 20	at Ashland	Ashland, OH	T 0–0	
October 28	at Hiram	Hiram, OH	T 0–0	
November 4	Marietta	Rockwell Field; Kent, OH	W 12–0	
November 18	Mount Union	Rockwell Field; Kent, OH	T 0–0	
