= 1934 Saint Louis Billikens football team =

American college football season

1934 Saint Louis Billikens football
- Conference: Independent
- Record: 3–3–2
- Head coach: Cecil Muellerleile (1st season)
- Home stadium: Walsh Stadium

1934 Midwestern college football independents records
	Conf.			Overall
Team	W	L	T	W		L		T
Michigan State		–		8	–	1	–	0
Wayne		–		7	–	1	–	0
Western State Teachers (MI)		–		7	–	1	–	0
Michigan State Normal		–		5	–	2	–	0
Notre Dame		–		6	–	3	–	0
Central State (MI)		–		5	–	3	–	0
Detroit		–		5	–	3	–	1
DePaul		–		4	–	3	–	0
Saint Louis		–		3	–	3	–	2
Marquette		–		4	–	5	–	0
Michigan Tech		–		1	–	2	–	1
Haskell		–		3	–	6	–	1
Missouri Mines		–		2	–	6	–	0
Wittenberg		–		2	–	7	–	0

The 1934 Saint Louis Billikens football team was an American football team that represented Saint Louis University as an independent during the 1934 college football season. In its first season under head coach Cecil Muellerleile, the team compiled a 3–3–2 record and was outscored by a total of 67 to 59. The team played its home games at Edward J. Walsh Memorial Stadium in St. Louis.

== Schedule ==
Date	Time	Opponent	Site	Result	Attendance	Source
October 5		Illinois Wesleyan	Walsh Stadium; St. Louis, MO	T 0–0	7,000	
October 12		Creighton	Walsh Stadium; St. Louis, MO	W 13–0	7,000	
October 20		at Missouri	Memorial Stadium; Columbia, MO	W 7–0	7,000	
October 27		at Xavier	Corcoran Field; Cincinnati, OH	T 7–7	5,000	
November 2	8:15 p.m.	Missouri Mines	Walsh Stadium; St. Louis, MO	W 25–0	5,000–6,000	
November 9	8:15 p.m.	Marquette	Walsh Stadium; St. Louis, MO	L 0–14	10,000	
November 16		Kirksville	Walsh Stadium; St. Louis, MO	L 0–19	10,000	
November 29	2:00 p.m.	at Washington University	Walsh Stadium; St. Louis, MO (Thanksgiving)	L 7–27	18,000	
All times are in Central time
