= 1934 Colorado Agricultural Aggies football team =

American college football season

1934 Colorado Agricultural Aggies football

RMC co-champion
- Conference: Rocky Mountain Conference
- Record: 6–2–1 (6–1–1 RMC)
- Head coach: Harry W. Hughes (24th season)
- Home stadium: Colorado Field

1934 Rocky Mountain Conference football standings
	Conf.					Overall
Team	W		L		T	W		L		T
Colorado Teachers +	6	–	1	–	0	6	–	1	–	0
Colorado +	6	–	1	–	0	6	–	1	–	2
Colorado Agricultural +	6	–	1	–	1	6	–	2	–	1
Utah State	5	–	1	–	1	5	–	1	–	1
Utah	4	–	2	–	0	5	–	3	–	0
Denver	4	–	4	–	0	5	–	5	–	1
BYU	3	–	5	–	0	4	–	5	–	0
Wyoming	2	–	4	–	0	3	–	5	–	0
Colorado College	1	–	6	–	0	1	–	7	–	0
Colorado Mines	1	–	6	–	0	1	–	6	–	0
Western State (CO)	0	–	3	–	0	2	–	5	–	0
Montana State	0	–	4	–	0	2	–	5	–	0
+ – Conference co-champions

The 1934 Colorado Agricultural Aggies football team represented Colorado Agricultural College (now known as Colorado State University) in the Rocky Mountain Conference (RMC) during the 1934 college football season. In their 24th season under head coach Harry W. Hughes, the Aggies compiled a 6–2–1 record (6–1–1 against RMC opponents), tied for the RMC championship, and outscored all opponents by a total of 173 to 67.

Three Colorado Agricultural players received all-conference honors in 1934: halfback Wilbur (Red) White, center Floyd Mencimer, and end Chet Cruikshank.

== Schedule ==
Date	Opponent	Site	Result	Attendance	Source
September 29	at Colorado Teachers	Jackson Field; Greeley, CO	W 12–0	5,894	
October 6	Arizona*	Colorado Field; Fort Collins, CO	L 3–7		
October 13	at Denver	Denver University Stadium; Denver, CO	W 2–0	9,759	
October 20	Colorado Mines	Colorado Field; Fort Collins, CO	W 56–0		
October 27	at Colorado	Colorado Stadium; Boulder, CO (rivalry)	L 9–27		
November 3	Wyoming	Colorado Field; Fort Collins, CO (rivalry)	W 16–0		
November 10	at Utah State	Aggie Stadium; Logan, UT	T 21–21	10,000	
November 17	Utah	Colorado Field; Fort Collins, CO	W 14–6	7,000	
November 24	vs. Colorado College	Denver University Stadium; Denver, CO	W 40–6	1,876	
*Non-conference game
