= 1934 Colorado Teachers Bears football team =

American college football season

1934 Colorado Teachers Bears football

RMC co-champion
- Conference: Rocky Mountain Conference
- Record: 6–1 (6–1 RMC)
- Head coach: John W. Hancock (3rd season)
- Home stadium: Jackson Field

1934 Rocky Mountain Conference football standings
	Conf.					Overall
Team	W		L		T	W		L		T
Colorado Teachers +	6	–	1	–	0	6	–	1	–	0
Colorado +	6	–	1	–	0	6	–	1	–	2
Colorado Agricultural +	6	–	1	–	1	6	–	2	–	1
Utah State	5	–	1	–	1	5	–	1	–	1
Utah	4	–	2	–	0	5	–	3	–	0
Denver	4	–	4	–	0	5	–	5	–	1
BYU	3	–	5	–	0	4	–	5	–	0
Wyoming	2	–	4	–	0	3	–	5	–	0
Colorado College	1	–	6	–	0	1	–	7	–	0
Colorado Mines	1	–	6	–	0	1	–	6	–	0
Western State (CO)	0	–	3	–	0	2	–	5	–	0
Montana State	0	–	4	–	0	2	–	5	–	0
+ – Conference co-champions

The 1934 Colorado Teachers Bears football team was an American football team that represented Colorado State Teachers College—now known as the University of Northern Colorado—as a member of the Rocky Mountain Conference (RMC) during the 1934 college football season. Led by third-year head coach John W. Hancock, the Bears compiled an overall record of 6–1 with an identical mark in conference play, sharing the RMC title with Colorado and Colorado Agricultural. The team outscored its opponents by a total of 148 to 31.

For the first time in program history, the Bears defeated the Colorado Buffaloes, prevailing by a 12–0 score in a Friday night game at the Bears' home field in Greeley, Colorado.

The Bears' Roy Hardin was selected as the first-team quarterback on the All-Rocky Mountain teams selected by the Associated Press (AP), United Press (UP), and O.L. "Poss" Parsons (for the "Spalding Guide"). The Associated Press noted that Hardin was "almost a unanimous choice" at quarterback and pointed to his 54 points scored "with his flashing legs and sharpshooting" which "guided his team to the most successful season in Colorado Teachers college history."

Also receiving All-Rocky Mountain honors, halfback Wilbur Olsen was named to the second team by the AP and UP, and center Chester O'Hanlon was named to the second team by Parsons and the third team by the AP.

Total attendance was 16,320 at four home games played at Jackson Field. The Friday game with the Colorado Buffaloes drew attendance of 5,894, including 982 local children who were admitted without charge as part of the school's "Knot Hole" club program.

== Schedule ==
Date	Opponent	Site	Result	Attendance	Source
September 29	Colorado Agricultural	Jackson Field; Greeley, CO	L 0–12	5,894	
October 5	Western State (CO)	Jackson Field; Greeley, CO	W 40–0	2,366	
October 12	Colorado	Jackson Field; Greeley, CO	W 13–7	5,894	
October 20	at Colorado College	Washburn Field; Colorado Springs, CO	W 21–0		
October 27	at Montana State	Gatton Field; Bozeman, MT	W 19–0		
November 10	Colorado Mines^{†}	Jackson Field; Greeley, CO	W 46–7	2,366	
November 17	at Wyoming	Corbett Field; Laramie, WY	W 9–6		
^{†}Homecoming
