= 1934 Oklahoma A&M Cowboys football team =

American college football season

1934 Oklahoma A&M Cowboys football
- Conference: Missouri Valley Conference
- Record: 4–5–1 (1–1 MVC)
- Head coach: Albert Exendine (1st season)
- Home stadium: Lewis Field

1934 Missouri Valley Conference football standings
	Conf.					Overall
Team	W		L		T	W		L		T
Washington University $	1	–	0	–	0	7	–	3	–	0
Creighton	2	–	1	–	0	2	–	7	–	0
Oklahoma A&M	1	–	1	–	0	4	–	5	–	1
Drake	2	–	2	–	0	3	–	6	–	1
Grinnell	0	–	2	–	0	2	–	7	–	0
$ – Conference champion

The 1934 Oklahoma A&M Cowboys football team represented Oklahoma A&M College in the 1934 college football season. This was the 34th year of football at A&M and the first under Albert Exendine, who replaced Pappy Waldorf who left to coach Kansas State. The Cowboys played their home games at Lewis Field in Stillwater, Oklahoma. They finished the season 4–5–1, 1–1 in the Missouri Valley Conference.

== Schedule ==
Date	Time	Opponent	Site	Result	Attendance	Source
September 28		Oklahoma Baptist*	Lewis Field; Stillwater, OK	W 12–0		
October 5		at Drake	Drake Stadium; Des Moines, IA	W 7–0		
October 12	8:00 p.m.	Haskell*	Lewis Field; Stillwater, OK	W 9–6	7,500	
October 20		at SMU*	Fair Park Stadium; Dallas, TX	L 0–41		
October 26		Creighton	Lewis Field; Stillwater, OK	L 7–13		
November 3		at Detroit*	University of Detroit Stadium; Detroit, MI	W 19–6		
November 10		at Duquesne*	Pitt Stadium; Pittsburgh, PA	L 0–32		
November 17		Tulsa*	Lewis Field; Stillwater, OK (rivalry)	L 0–19		
November 24		Oklahoma*^{†}	Lewis Field; Stillwater, OK (Bedlam Series)	T 0–0		
November 29		at Oklahoma City*	Goldbug Field; Oklahoma City, OK	L 0–13	1,500	
*Non-conference game; ^{†}Homecoming; All times are in Central time
