= 1934 Wyoming Cowboys football team =

American college football season

1934 Wyoming Cowboys football
- Conference: Rocky Mountain Conference
- Record: 3–5 (2–4 RMC)
- Head coach: Willard Witte (2nd season)
- Captain: None
- Home stadium: Corbett Field

1934 Rocky Mountain Conference football standings
	Conf.					Overall
Team	W		L		T	W		L		T
Colorado Teachers +	6	–	1	–	0	6	–	1	–	0
Colorado +	6	–	1	–	0	6	–	1	–	2
Colorado Agricultural +	6	–	1	–	1	6	–	2	–	1
Utah State	5	–	1	–	1	5	–	1	–	1
Utah	4	–	2	–	0	5	–	3	–	0
Denver	4	–	4	–	0	5	–	5	–	1
BYU	3	–	5	–	0	4	–	5	–	0
Wyoming	2	–	4	–	0	3	–	5	–	0
Colorado College	1	–	6	–	0	1	–	7	–	0
Colorado Mines	1	–	6	–	0	1	–	6	–	0
Western State (CO)	0	–	3	–	0	2	–	5	–	0
Montana State	0	–	4	–	0	2	–	5	–	0
+ – Conference co-champions

The 1934 Wyoming Cowboys football team was an American football team that represented the University of Wyoming in the Rocky Mountain Conference (RMC) during the 1934 college football season. In their second season under head coach Willard Witte, the Cowboys compiled a 3–5 record (2–4 against RMC opponents), finished eighth in the RMC, and were outscored by a total of 109 to 78.

== Schedule ==
Date	Opponent	Site	Result	Attendance	Source
September 22	at Fort Warren*	Cheyenne, WY	W 40–0		
September 29	at Nebraska*	Memorial Stadium; Lincoln, NE	L 0–50	15,851	
October 6	BYU	Corbett Field; Laramie, WY	W 6–0		
October 13	vs. Montana State	Public Schools Stadium; Billings, MT	W 25–6	Nearly 5,000	
October 20	Utah State	Corbett Field; Laramie, WY (rivalry)	L 0–19		
October 27	at Denver	DU Stadium; Denver, CO	L 0–9		
November 3	at Colorado Agricultural	Colorado Field; Fort Collins, CO (rivalry)	L 0–16		
November 17	Colorado Teachers	Corbett Field; Laramie, WY	L 6–9		
*Non-conference game
