= 1934 Marquette Golden Avalanche football team =

American college football season

1934 Marquette Golden Avalanche football
- Conference: Independent
- Record: 4–5
- Head coach: Frank Murray (13th season)
- Home stadium: Marquette Stadium

1934 Midwestern college football independents records
	Conf.			Overall
Team	W	L	T	W		L		T
Michigan State		–		8	–	1	–	0
Wayne		–		7	–	1	–	0
Western State Teachers (MI)		–		7	–	1	–	0
Michigan State Normal		–		5	–	2	–	0
Notre Dame		–		6	–	3	–	0
Central State (MI)		–		5	–	3	–	0
Detroit		–		5	–	3	–	1
DePaul		–		4	–	3	–	0
Saint Louis		–		3	–	3	–	2
Marquette		–		4	–	5	–	0
Michigan Tech		–		1	–	2	–	1
Haskell		–		3	–	6	–	1
Missouri Mines		–		2	–	6	–	0
Wittenberg		–		2	–	7	–	0

The 1934 Marquette Golden Avalanche football team was an American football team that represented Marquette University as an independent during the 1934 college football season. In its 13th season under head coach Frank Murray, the team compiled a 4–5 record and outscored opponents by a total of 129 to 104. The team played its home games at Marquette Stadium in Milwaukee.

Frank Murray was Marquette's head football coach for 19 years and was posthumously inducted into the College Football Hall of Fame in 1983.

== Schedule ==
Date	Time	Opponent	Site	Result	Attendance	Source
September 29		at Northwestern	Dyche Stadium; Evanston, IL	L 12–21	25,000	
October 6		at Wisconsin	Camp Randall Stadium; Madison, WI	L 0–3	19,588	
October 12		Kansas State	Marquette Stadium; Milwaukee, WI	W 27–20	10,000	
October 20		Centre	Marquette Stadium; Milwaukee, WI	W 19–6	12,000	
October 27		Temple	Marquette Stadium; Milwaukee, WI	L 6–28	15,000	
November 3		at Michigan State	College Field; East Lansing, MI	L 7–13	13,000	
November 9	8:15 p.m.	at Saint Louis	Walsh Stadium; St. Louis, MO	W 14–0	10,000	
November 17		at Creighton	Creighton Stadium; Omaha, NE	W 38–0		
November 24		Detroit	Marquette Stadium; Milwaukee, WI	L 6–13	9,000	
All times are in Central time
