= 1934 Utah State Aggies football team =

American college football season

1934 Utah State Aggies football
- Conference: Rocky Mountain Conference
- Record: 5–1–1 (5–1–1 RMC)
- Head coach: Dick Romney (16th season)
- Home stadium: Aggie Stadium

1934 Rocky Mountain Conference football standings
	Conf.					Overall
Team	W		L		T	W		L		T
Colorado Teachers +	6	–	1	–	0	6	–	1	–	0
Colorado +	6	–	1	–	0	6	–	1	–	2
Colorado Agricultural +	6	–	1	–	1	6	–	2	–	1
Utah State	5	–	1	–	1	5	–	1	–	1
Utah	4	–	2	–	0	5	–	3	–	0
Denver	4	–	4	–	0	5	–	5	–	1
BYU	3	–	5	–	0	4	–	5	–	0
Wyoming	2	–	4	–	0	3	–	5	–	0
Colorado College	1	–	6	–	0	1	–	7	–	0
Colorado Mines	1	–	6	–	0	1	–	6	–	0
Western State (CO)	0	–	3	–	0	2	–	5	–	0
Montana State	0	–	4	–	0	2	–	5	–	0
+ – Conference co-champions

The 1934 Utah State Aggies football team was an American football team that represented Utah State Agricultural College in the Rocky Mountain Conference (RMC) during the 1934 college football season. In their 16th season under head coach Dick Romney, the Aggies compiled a 5–1–1, finished fourth in the RMC, and outscored all opponents by a total of 131 to 42.

Center Elmer "Bear" Ward was selected as a first-team All-American by the Newspaper Enterprise Association; he was the first Utah State player to be selected as a first-team All-American. Three Utah State players received first-team all-conference honors in 1934: Ward; fullback Kent Ryan; and end Joe Whitesides.

== Schedule ==
Date	Opponent	Site	Result	Attendance	Source
September 29	at Denver	Denver University Stadium; Denver, CO	W 26–7		
October 6	Montana State	Aggie Stadium; Logan, UT	W 6–0		
October 20	at Wyoming	Corbett Field; Laramie, WY (rivalry)	W 19–0		
November 3	at BYU	Provo, UT (rivalry)	W 15–0	6,000	
November 10	Colorado Agricultural^{†}	Aggie Stadium; Logan, UT	T 21–21	10,000	
November 17	Colorado Mines	Aggie Stadium; Logan, UT	W 37–0	2,000	
November 29	at Utah	Ute Stadium; Salt Lake City, UT (rivalry)	L 7–14	15,043	
^{†}Homecoming
