= 1934 Grinnell Pioneers football team =

American college football season

1934 Grinnell Pioneers football
- Conference: Missouri Valley Conference
- Record: 2–7 (0–2 MVC)
- Head coach: Lester Watt (8th season)
- Home stadium: Ward Field

1934 Missouri Valley Conference football standings
	Conf.					Overall
Team	W		L		T	W		L		T
Washington University $	1	–	0	–	0	7	–	3	–	0
Creighton	2	–	1	–	0	2	–	7	–	0
Oklahoma A&M	1	–	1	–	0	4	–	5	–	1
Drake	2	–	2	–	0	3	–	6	–	1
Grinnell	0	–	2	–	0	2	–	7	–	0
$ – Conference champion

The 1934 Grinnell Pioneers football team represented Grinnell College as a member of the Missouri Valley Conference (MVC) during the 1934 college football season. Led by eighth-year head coach Lester Watt, the Pioneers compiled an overall record of 2–7 with a mark of 0–2 in conference play, placing last out of five teams in the MVC.

== Schedule ==
Date	Time	Opponent	Site	Result	Attendance	Source
September 29		at Michigan State*	College Field; East Lansing, MI	L 20–33	15,000	
October 6	2:00 p.m.	at Iowa State*	State Field; Ames, IA	L 6–26	3,921	
October 13	2:30 p.m.	Carleton*^{†}	Ward Field; Grinnell, IA	L 0–7		
October 19	8:15 p.m.	at Drake	Drake Stadium; Des Moines, IA	L 0–8		
October 26	8:00 p.m.	Haskell*	Grinnell, IA	L 0–3		
November 3	2:30 p.m.	at Creighton	Creighton Stadium; Omaha, NE	L 6–12	3,000	
November 10	2:00 p.m.	at Iowa State Teachers*	Cedar Falls, IA	W 19–12	3,200	
November 17	2:00 p.m.	at Coe*	Cedar Rapids, IA	L 0–26		
November 24		Cornell (IA)*	Grinnell, IA	W 23–0		
*Non-conference game; ^{†}Homecoming; All times are in Central time
