= 1934 Montana State Bobcats football team =

American college football season

1934 Montana State Bobcats football
- Conference: Rocky Mountain Conference
- Record: 2–5 (0–4 RMC)
- Head coach: Schubert R. Dyche (7th season)
- Home stadium: Gatton Field

1934 Rocky Mountain Conference football standings
	Conf.					Overall
Team	W		L		T	W		L		T
Colorado Teachers +	6	–	1	–	0	6	–	1	–	0
Colorado +	6	–	1	–	0	6	–	1	–	2
Colorado Agricultural +	6	–	1	–	1	6	–	2	–	1
Utah State	5	–	1	–	1	5	–	1	–	1
Utah	4	–	2	–	0	5	–	3	–	0
Denver	4	–	4	–	0	5	–	5	–	1
BYU	3	–	5	–	0	4	–	5	–	0
Wyoming	2	–	4	–	0	3	–	5	–	0
Colorado College	1	–	6	–	0	1	–	7	–	0
Colorado Mines	1	–	6	–	0	1	–	6	–	0
Western State (CO)	0	–	3	–	0	2	–	5	–	0
Montana State	0	–	4	–	0	2	–	5	–	0
+ – Conference co-champions

The 1934 Montana State Bobcats football team was an American football team that represented Montana State College (later renamed Montana State University) as a member of the Rocky Mountain Conference (RMC) during the 1934 college football season. In their seventh season under head coach Schubert R. Dyche, the Bobcats compiled a 2–5 record (0–4 against RMC opponents), finished in last place out of 12 teams in the RMC, and were outscored by a total of 95 to 38.

== Schedule ==
Date	Opponent	Site	Result	Attendance	Source
September 15	Butte Englewoods*	Gatton Field; Bozeman, MT	W 20–0		
September 22	vs. BYU	Memorial Stadium; Great Falls, MT	L 6–20		
September 28	North Dakota Teachers*	Gatton Field; Bozeman, MT	W 6–0		
October 6	at Utah State	Aggie Stadium; Logan, UT	L 0–6		
October 13	vs. Wyoming	Public Schools Stadium; Billings, MT	L 6–25	Nearly 5,000	
October 27	Colorado Teachers^{†}	Gatton Field; Bozeman, MT	L 0–19		
November 10	vs. Montana*	Clark Park; Butte, MT (rivalry)	L 0–25	6,500	
*Non-conference game; ^{†}Homecoming
