= 1933 Toledo Rockets football team =

American college football season

1933 Toledo Rockets football
- Conference: Ohio Athletic Conference
- Record: 4–2–2 (3–2–1 OAC)
- Head coach: Jim Nicholson (3rd season)
- Captain: Ed Smolinski
- Home stadium: Swayne Field

1933 Ohio Athletic Conference football standings
	Conf.					Overall
Team	W		L		T	W		L		T
Dayton $	3	–	0	–	1	8	–	2	–	1
Wooster	7	–	1	–	1	7	–	1	–	1
Akron	5	–	2	–	1	5	–	3	–	1
Case	5	–	2	–	0	5	–	3	–	1
Muskingum	4	–	2	–	1	5	–	2	–	1
Baldwin–Wallace	4	–	2	–	1	5	–	3	–	1
Toledo	3	–	2	–	1	5	–	2	–	1
John Carroll	3	–	2	–	2	5	–	2	–	2
Hiram	2	–	2	–	2	2	–	2	–	3
Kent State	2	–	2	–	3	2	–	2	–	3
Otterbein	3	–	4	–	1	3	–	4	–	1
Mount Union	3	–	4	–	1	3	–	5	–	1
Marietta	2	–	3	–	1	3	–	3	–	1
Heidelberg	2	–	3	–	2	2	–	5	–	2
Denison	2	–	3	–	1	2	–	6	–	1
Oberlin	2	–	3	–	0	4	–	4	–	0
Ashland	2	–	4	–	1	3	–	4	–	1
Bowling Green	1	–	3	–	2	2	–	3	–	2
Capital	1	–	4	–	2	1	–	4	–	2
Ohio Northern	0	–	4	–	1	0	–	5	–	2
Kenyon	0	–	5	–	1	1	–	5	–	1
Xavier *	1	–	0	–	0	5	–	4	–	0
$ – Conference champion; * – did not compete for championship

The 1933 Toledo Rockets football team was an American football team that represented Toledo University in the Ohio Athletic Conference during the 1933 college football season. In their third season under head coach Jim Nicholson, the Rockets compiled a 4–2–2 record.

== Schedule ==
Date	Opponent	Site	Result	Attendance	Source
September 30	at Capital	Bexley, OH	L 2–7		
October 7	at Detroit City College*	Kelsey Field; Detroit, MI	T 0–0		
October 14	Defiance*	Swayne Field; Toledo, OH	W 29–6		
October 21	at Kenyon	Gambier, OH	W 12–0		
October 28	Bowling Green	Swayne Field; Toledo, OH (rivalry)	W 25–7		
November 4	Heidelberg	Swayne Field; Toledo, OH	T 6–6		
November 11	John Carroll	Swayne Field; Toledo, OH	L 13–33		
November 18	Otterbein	Swayne Field; Toledo, OH	W 12–7		
*Non-conference game
