= 1934 Western State Teachers Hilltoppers football team =

American college football season

1934 Western State Teachers Hilltoppers football
- Conference: Independent
- Record: 7–1
- Head coach: Mike Gary (6th season)
- Captain: John Miller

1934 Midwestern college football independents records
	Conf.			Overall
Team	W	L	T	W		L		T
Michigan State		–		8	–	1	–	0
Wayne		–		7	–	1	–	0
Western State Teachers (MI)		–		7	–	1	–	0
Michigan State Normal		–		5	–	2	–	0
Notre Dame		–		6	–	3	–	0
Central State (MI)		–		5	–	3	–	0
Detroit		–		5	–	3	–	1
DePaul		–		4	–	3	–	0
Saint Louis		–		3	–	3	–	2
Marquette		–		4	–	5	–	0
Michigan Tech		–		1	–	2	–	1
Haskell		–		3	–	6	–	1
Missouri Mines		–		2	–	6	–	0
Wittenberg		–		2	–	7	–	0

The 1934 Western State Teachers Hilltoppers football team was an American football team that represented Western State Teachers College (later renamed Western Michigan University) as an independent during the 1934 college football season. In their sixth season under head coach Mike Gary, the Hilltoppers compiled a 7–1 record and outscored their opponents, 104 to 52. Halfback John Miller was the team captain.

== Schedule ==
Date	Opponent	Site	Result	Source
October 5	at Detroit	University of Detroit Stadium; Detroit, MI	L 7–25	
October 12	at Carroll (WI)	Waukesha, WI	W 25–7	
October 20	Iowa State Teachers	Western State Teachers College Field; Kalamazoo, MI	W 7–0	
October 27	DePaul	Western State Teachers College Field; Kalamazoo, MI	W 13–0	
November 3	Central State (MI)	Western State Teachers College Field; Kalamazoo, MI (rivalry)	W 13–0	
November 10	at St. Viator	Kankakee, IL	W 19–7	
November 24	West Chester	Western State Teachers College Field; Kalamazoo, MI	W 13–7	
November 29	at Western Kentucky State Teachers	Bowling Green, KY	W 7–6	
