= 1934 DePaul Blue Demons football team =

American college football season

1934 DePaul Blue Demons football
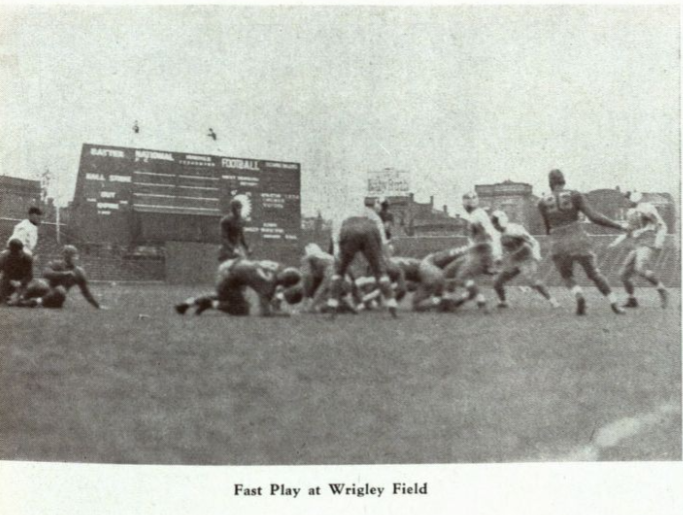
- DePaul defeats Niagra at Wrigley Field on November 10.
- Conference: Independent
- Record: 4–3
- Head coach: Jim Kelly (3rd season)
- Home stadium: Loyola Field, Wrigley Field

1934 Midwestern college football independents records
	Conf.			Overall
Team	W	L	T	W		L		T
Michigan State		–		8	–	1	–	0
Wayne		–		7	–	1	–	0
Western State Teachers (MI)		–		7	–	1	–	0
Michigan State Normal		–		5	–	2	–	0
Notre Dame		–		6	–	3	–	0
Central State (MI)		–		5	–	3	–	0
Detroit		–		5	–	3	–	1
DePaul		–		4	–	3	–	0
Saint Louis		–		3	–	3	–	2
Marquette		–		4	–	5	–	0
Michigan Tech		–		1	–	2	–	1
Haskell		–		3	–	6	–	1
Missouri Mines		–		2	–	6	–	0
Wittenberg		–		2	–	7	–	0

The 1934 DePaul Blue Demons football team was an American football team that represented DePaul University as an independent during the 1934 college football season. The team compiled a 4–3 record and was outscored by a total of 105 to 102. The team played its home games at Loyola Field and Wrigley Field, both in Chicago.

== Schedule ==
Date	Opponent	Site	Result	Attendance	Source
September 29	Ripon	Loyola Field; Chicago, IL	W 33–6		
October 5	St. Ambrose	Loyola Field; Chicago, IL	W 20–6		
October 12	Dayton	Loyola Field; Chicago, IL	W 12–6		
October 27	at Western State Teachers (MI)	Western State Teachers College Field; Kalamazoo, MI	L 0–13		
November 3	at Valparaiso	Brown Field; Valparaiso, IN	L 0–19		
November 10	Niagara^{†}	Wrigley Field; Chicago, IL	W 18–7		
November 16	at Texas Tech	Tech Field; Lubbock, TX	L 19–48	4,000	
^{†}Homecoming
