= 1934 Xavier Musketeers football team =

American college football season

1934 Xavier Musketeers football
- Conference: Ohio Athletic Conference
- Record: 6–2–1 (2–0 OAC)
- Head coach: Joseph A. Meyer (15th season)
- Home stadium: Corcoran Field

1934 Ohio Athletic Conference football standings
	Conf.					Overall
Team	W		L		T	W		L		T
Wooster $	8	–	0	–	0	8	–	1	–	0
Denison	6	–	0	–	1	6	–	1	–	1
Baldwin–Wallace	5	–	0	–	0	7	–	1	–	0
Ohio Northern	5	–	0	–	1	6	–	0	–	1
Xavier	2	–	0	–	0	6	–	2	–	1
Dayton	1	–	0	–	1	4	–	3	–	1
Toledo	4	–	1	–	0	5	–	3	–	0
Muskingum	4	–	2	–	1	5	–	3	–	1
Case	3	–	2	–	2	4	–	3	–	2
Mount Union	4	–	3	–	0	4	–	4	–	0
John Carroll	1	–	1	–	2	5	–	2	–	2
Akron	3	–	4	–	0	3	–	4	–	1
Heidelberg	3	–	4	–	0	3	–	5	–	0
Kent State	2	–	3	–	3	2	–	3	–	3
Bowling Green	2	–	3	–	2	2	–	3	–	2
Marietta	1	–	3	–	2	2	–	3	–	2
Capital	2	–	5	–	0	2	–	5	–	0
Hiram	2	–	5	–	0	2	–	5	–	0
Oberlin	1	–	3	–	1	2	–	5	–	1
Ashland	1	–	4	–	1	2	–	6	–	1
Wittenberg	1	–	5	–	0	2	–	7	–	0
Otterbein	1	–	6	–	0	2	–	7	–	0
Findlay	0	–	2	–	0	3	–	3	–	0
Kenyon	0	–	6	–	1	0	–	7	–	1
$ – Conference champion

The 1934 Xavier Musketeers football team was an American football team that represented Xavier University in the Ohio Athletic Conference (OAC) during the 1934 college football season. The team compiled a 6–2–1 record and outscored opponents by a total of 220 to 55. The team played its home games at Corcoran Field in Cincinnati.

== Schedule ==
Date	Time	Opponent	Site	Result	Attendance	Source
September 21		Transylvania*	Corcoran Field; Cincinnati, OH	W 41–0	4,000	
September 28		Kenyon	Corcoran Field; Cincinnati, OH	W 32–0	3,200	
October 5		Findlay	Corcoran Field; Cincinnati, OH	W 30–3	5,000	
October 12	8:15 p.m.	Centre*	Corcoran Field; Cincinnati, OH	L 6–7	5,500–7,000	
October 19		West Virginia Wesleyan*	Corcoran Field; Cincinnati, OH	W 13–6		
October 27		Saint Louis*	Corcoran Field; Cincinnati, OH	T 7–7	5,000	
November 3		Maryville (TN)*	Corcoran Field; Cincinnati, OH	W 40–6		
November 17		Washington & Jefferson*	Corcoran Field; Cincinnati, OH	L 13–20	6,000	
November 29	2:30 p.m.	Haskell*	Corcoran Field; Cincinnati, OH	W 38–6	8,000	
*Non-conference game; All times are in Eastern time
