= 1934 Ohio Northern Polar Bears football team =

American college football season

1934 Ohio Northern Polar Bears football
- Conference: Ohio Athletic Conference
- Record: 6–0–1 (4–0–1 OAC)
- Head coach: Harris Lamb (4th season)

1934 Ohio Athletic Conference football standings
	Conf.					Overall
Team	W		L		T	W		L		T
Wooster $	8	–	0	–	0	8	–	1	–	0
Denison	6	–	0	–	1	6	–	1	–	1
Baldwin–Wallace	5	–	0	–	0	7	–	1	–	0
Ohio Northern	5	–	0	–	1	6	–	0	–	1
Xavier	2	–	0	–	0	6	–	2	–	1
Dayton	1	–	0	–	1	4	–	3	–	1
Toledo	4	–	1	–	0	5	–	3	–	0
Muskingum	4	–	2	–	1	5	–	3	–	1
Case	3	–	2	–	2	4	–	3	–	2
Mount Union	4	–	3	–	0	4	–	4	–	0
John Carroll	1	–	1	–	2	5	–	2	–	2
Akron	3	–	4	–	0	3	–	4	–	1
Heidelberg	3	–	4	–	0	3	–	5	–	0
Kent State	2	–	3	–	3	2	–	3	–	3
Bowling Green	2	–	3	–	2	2	–	3	–	2
Marietta	1	–	3	–	2	2	–	3	–	2
Capital	2	–	5	–	0	2	–	5	–	0
Hiram	2	–	5	–	0	2	–	5	–	0
Oberlin	1	–	3	–	1	2	–	5	–	1
Ashland	1	–	4	–	1	2	–	6	–	1
Wittenberg	1	–	5	–	0	2	–	7	–	0
Otterbein	1	–	6	–	0	2	–	7	–	0
Findlay	0	–	2	–	0	3	–	3	–	0
Kenyon	0	–	6	–	1	0	–	7	–	1
$ – Conference champion

The 1934 Ohio Northern Polar Bears football team was an American football team that represented Ohio Northern University in the Ohio Athletic Conference during the 1934 college football season. In their fourth year under head coach Harris Lamb, the Polar Bears compiled a 6–0–1 record, did not allow opponents to score a point, and outscored opponents by a total of 104 to 0.

== Schedule ==
Date	Opponent	Site	Result	Source
October 5	at Heidelberg	Tiffin, OH	W 13–0	
October 13	Hiram	Ada, OH	W 33–0	
October 20	Capital^{†}	Ada, OH	W 20–0	
October 27	at Otterbein	Westerville, OH	W 23–0	
November 3	at Wittenberg*	Springfield, OH	W 7–0	
November 10	at Bowling Green	Bowling Green, OH	T 0–0	
November 16	Bluffton*	Ada, OH	W 8–0	
*Non-conference game; ^{†}Homecoming
