= 1934 Akron Zippers football team =

American college football season

1934 Akron Zippers football
- Conference: Ohio Athletic Conference
- Record: 3–4–1 (3–4 OAC)
- Head coach: Red Blair (8th season)
- Captain: Don Lindsay
- Home stadium: Buchtel Field

1934 Ohio Athletic Conference football standings
	Conf.					Overall
Team	W		L		T	W		L		T
Wooster $	8	–	0	–	0	8	–	1	–	0
Denison	6	–	0	–	1	6	–	1	–	1
Baldwin–Wallace	5	–	0	–	0	7	–	1	–	0
Ohio Northern	5	–	0	–	1	6	–	0	–	1
Xavier	2	–	0	–	0	6	–	2	–	1
Dayton	1	–	0	–	1	4	–	3	–	1
Toledo	4	–	1	–	0	5	–	3	–	0
Muskingum	4	–	2	–	1	5	–	3	–	1
Case	3	–	2	–	2	4	–	3	–	2
Mount Union	4	–	3	–	0	4	–	4	–	0
John Carroll	1	–	1	–	2	5	–	2	–	2
Akron	3	–	4	–	0	3	–	4	–	1
Heidelberg	3	–	4	–	0	3	–	5	–	0
Kent State	2	–	3	–	3	2	–	3	–	3
Bowling Green	2	–	3	–	2	2	–	3	–	2
Marietta	1	–	3	–	2	2	–	3	–	2
Capital	2	–	5	–	0	2	–	5	–	0
Hiram	2	–	5	–	0	2	–	5	–	0
Oberlin	1	–	3	–	1	2	–	5	–	1
Ashland	1	–	4	–	1	2	–	6	–	1
Wittenberg	1	–	5	–	0	2	–	7	–	0
Otterbein	1	–	6	–	0	2	–	7	–	0
Findlay	0	–	2	–	0	3	–	3	–	0
Kenyon	0	–	6	–	1	0	–	7	–	1
$ – Conference champion

The 1934 Akron Zippers football team was an American football team that represented the University of Akron in the Ohio Athletic Conference during the 1934 college football season. In its eighth season under head coach Red Blair, the team compiled a 3–4–1 record (3–4 in conference) and outscored opponents by a total of 65 to 48. Don Lindsay was the team captain.

== Schedule ==
Date	Opponent	Site	Result	Attendance	Source
September 28	at Western Reserve*	Cleveland, OH	T 7–7	2,500	
October 5	Kent State	Buchtel Field; Akron, OH (rivalry)	W 26–0	5,500	
October 20	at Wooster	Wooster, OH	L 0–6		
October 27	at Muskingum	New Concord, OH	L 0–3		
November 3	John Carroll	Buchtel Field; Akron, OH	L 6–14		
November 10	Heidelberg	Buchtel Field; Akron, OH	W 13–6		
November 17	Baldwin–Wallace	Buchtel Field; Akron, OH	L 0–12		
November 24	Mount Union	Buchtel Field; Akron, OH	W 13–0		
*Non-conference game
