= 1934 Kansas Jayhawks football team =

American college football season

1934 Kansas Jayhawks football
- Conference: Big Six Conference
- Record: 3–4–3 (2–2–1 Big 6)
- Head coach: Adrian Lindsey (3rd season)
- Captain: Ole Nesmith
- Home stadium: Memorial Stadium

1934 Big Six Conference football standings
	Conf.					Overall
Team	W		L		T	W		L		T
Kansas State $	5	–	0	–	0	7	–	2	–	1
Nebraska	4	–	1	–	0	6	–	3	–	0
Oklahoma	2	–	2	–	1	3	–	4	–	2
Kansas	1	–	2	–	2	3	–	4	–	3
Iowa State	1	–	3	–	1	5	–	3	–	1
Missouri	0	–	5	–	0	0	–	8	–	1
$ – Conference champion

The 1934 Kansas Jayhawks football team represented the University of Kansas in the Big Six Conference during the 1934 college football season. In their third season under head coach Adrian Lindsey, the Jayhawks compiled a 3–4–3 record (2–2–1 against conference opponents), finished in fourth place in the conference, and outscored opponents by a combined total of 74 to 48. They played their home games at Memorial Stadium in Lawrence, Kansas. Ole Nesmith was the team captain.

== Schedule ==
Date	Time	Opponent	Site	Result	Attendance	Source
September 29		Colorado*	Memorial Stadium; Lawrence, KS	T 0–0		
October 6		at Tulsa*	Skelly Field; Tulsa, OK	L 0–7		
October 13		St. Benedict's*	Memorial Stadium; Lawrence, KS	W 34–12		
October 20		at Kansas State	Memorial Stadium; Manhattan, KS (rivalry)	L 0–13		
October 27		Oklahoma	Memorial Stadium; Lawrence, KS	T 7–7		
November 3		at Iowa State	State Field; Ames, IA	T 0–0		
November 10	2:00 p.m.	at Washington University*	Francis Field; St. Louis, MO	W 13–0	7,902	
November 17		Nebraska	Memorial Stadium; Lawrence, KS (rivalry)	L 0–3		
November 24		Michigan State*	Memorial Stadium; Lawrence, KS	L 0–6	6,852	
November 29		at Missouri	Memorial Stadium; Columbia, MO (rivalry)	W 20–0		
*Non-conference game; All times are in Central time
