= 1934 Utah Utes football team =

American college football season

1934 Utah Utes football
- Conference: Rocky Mountain Conference
- Record: 5–3 (4–2 RMC)
- Head coach: Ike Armstrong (10th season)
- Home stadium: Ute Stadium

1934 Rocky Mountain Conference football standings
	Conf.					Overall
Team	W		L		T	W		L		T
Colorado Teachers +	6	–	1	–	0	6	–	1	–	0
Colorado +	6	–	1	–	0	6	–	1	–	2
Colorado Agricultural +	6	–	1	–	1	6	–	2	–	1
Utah State	5	–	1	–	1	5	–	1	–	1
Utah	4	–	2	–	0	5	–	3	–	0
Denver	4	–	4	–	0	5	–	5	–	1
BYU	3	–	5	–	0	4	–	5	–	0
Wyoming	2	–	4	–	0	3	–	5	–	0
Colorado College	1	–	6	–	0	1	–	7	–	0
Colorado Mines	1	–	6	–	0	1	–	6	–	0
Western State (CO)	0	–	3	–	0	2	–	5	–	0
Montana State	0	–	4	–	0	2	–	5	–	0
+ – Conference co-champions

The 1934 Utah Utes football team was an American football team that represented the University of Utah as a member of the Rocky Mountain Conference (RMC) during the 1934 college football season. In their 10th season under head coach Ike Armstrong, the Utes compiled an overall record of 5–3 with a mark of 4–2 in conference play, placed fifth in the RMC, and outscored all opponents by a total of 150 to 42.

== Schedule ==
Date	Opponent	Site	Result	Attendance	Source
September 28	at Drake*	Drake Stadium; Des Moines, IA	W 6–0	5,000	
October 6	Colorado College	Ute Stadium; Salt Lake City, UT	W 61–6	12,000	
October 13	BYU	Ute Stadium; Salt Lake City, UT (rivalry)	W 43–0		
October 20	Denver	Ute Stadium; Salt Lake City, UT	W 7–0		
October 27	Oregon*^{†}	Ute Stadium; Salt Lake City, UT	L 7–8	20,000	
November 10	at Colorado	Colorado Stadium; Boulder, CO (rivalry)	L 6–7	15,000	
November 17	at Colorado Agricultural	Colorado Field; Fort Collins, CO	L 6–14	7,000	
November 29	Utah State	Ute Stadium; Salt Lake City, UT (rivalry)	W 14–7	15,043	
*Non-conference game; ^{†}Homecoming
