= 1934 Western Reserve Red Cats football team =

American college football season

1934 Western Reserve Red Cats football

Big Four champion
- Conference: Big Four Conference
- Record: 7–1–1 (3–0 Big Four)
- Head coach: Sam Willaman (1st season)
- Home stadium: League Park

The 1934 Western Reserve Red Cats football team represented Western Reserve University, now known as Case Western Reserve University, during the 1934 college football season. The team was led by Sam Willaman, in his first and only hear as head coach. His staff included assistant coach Bill Edwards.

== Schedule ==
Date	Opponent	Site	Result	Attendance	Source
September 28	Akron*	Van Horn Field; Cleveland, OH	T 7–7		
October 6	at Toledo*	Swayne Field; Toledo, OH	W 7–0		
October 13	at Buffalo*	Rotary Field; Buffalo, NY	W 33–0		
October 20	at Mount Union*	Mount Field; Alliance, OH	W 25–0		
October 27	at Baldwin–Wallace	League Park; Cleveland, OH	W 8–6		
November 3	Ohio State*	League Park; Cleveland, OH	L 0–76	11,890	
November 17	at Case	League Park; Cleveland, OH	W 21–13	10,000	
November 24	Oberlin*	League Park; Cleveland, OH	W 51–7		
November 29	John Carroll	League Park; Cleveland, OH	W 14–0	13,000	
*Non-conference game
