= 1934 Missouri Tigers football team =

American college football season

1934 Missouri Tigers football
- Conference: Big Six Conference
- Record: 0–8–1 (0–5 Big 6)
- Head coach: Frank Carideo (3rd season)
- Home stadium: Memorial Stadium

1934 Big Six Conference football standings
	Conf.					Overall
Team	W		L		T	W		L		T
Kansas State $	5	–	0	–	0	7	–	2	–	1
Nebraska	4	–	1	–	0	6	–	3	–	0
Oklahoma	2	–	2	–	1	3	–	4	–	2
Kansas	1	–	2	–	2	3	–	4	–	3
Iowa State	1	–	3	–	1	5	–	3	–	1
Missouri	0	–	5	–	0	0	–	8	–	1
$ – Conference champion

The 1934 Missouri Tigers football team was an American football team that represented the University of Missouri in the Big Six Conference (Big 6) during the 1934 college football season. The team compiled a 0–8–1 record (0–5 against Big 6 opponents), finished in sixth place in the Big 6, and was outscored by all opponents by a combined total of 172 to 25. Frank Carideo was the head coach for the third of three seasons. The team played its home games at Memorial Stadium in Columbia, Missouri.

1934 is the only season a Missouri Tigers football team won zero games in the program's history. The team's leading scorer was Harold Bourne with 13 points.

== Schedule ==
Date	Opponent	Site	Result	Attendance	Source
October 6	at Colorado*	Colorado Stadium; Boulder, CO	T 0–0		
October 13	Iowa State	Memorial Stadium; Columbia, MO (rivalry)	L 0–13	5,458	
October 20	Saint Louis*	Memorial Stadium; Columbia, MO	L 0–7	7,000	
October 27	at Chicago*	Stagg Field; Chicago, IL	L 6–19	10,000	
November 3	at Oklahoma	Memorial Stadium; Norman, OK (rivalry)	L 0–31		
November 10	at Kansas State	Memorial Stadium; Manhattan, KS	L 0–29		
November 17	Washington University*	Memorial Stadium; Columbia, MO	L 13–40		
November 24	at Nebraska	Memorial Stadium; Lincoln, NE (rivalry)	L 6–13		
November 29	Kansas	Memorial Stadium; Columbia, MO (rivalry)	L 0–20		
*Non-conference game
