= 1934 Drake Bulldogs football team =

American college football season

1934 Drake Bulldogs football
- Conference: Missouri Valley Conference
- Record: 3–6–1 (2–2 MVC)
- Head coach: Vee Green (2nd season)
- Home stadium: Drake Stadium

1934 Missouri Valley Conference football standings
| | Conf. | | | | | Overall |
| Team | W | | L | | T | W | | L | | T |
|---|---|---|---|---|---|---|---|---|---|---|
| Washington University $ | 1 | – | 0 | – | 0 | 7 | – | 3 | – | 0 |
| Creighton | 2 | – | 1 | – | 0 | 2 | – | 7 | – | 0 |
| Oklahoma A&M | 1 | – | 1 | – | 0 | 4 | – | 5 | – | 1 |
| Drake | 2 | – | 2 | – | 0 | 3 | – | 6 | – | 1 |
| Grinnell | 0 | – | 2 | – | 0 | 2 | – | 7 | – | 0 |
$ – Conference champion

The 1934 Drake Bulldogs football team was an American football team that represented Drake University in the Missouri Valley Conference (MVC) during the 1934 college football season. In its second season under head coach Vee Green, the team compiled a 3–6–1 record (2–2 against MVC opponents), tied for third place in the conference, and was outscored by a total of 135 to 59.

== Schedule ==
| Date | Time | Opponent | Site | Result | Attendance | Source |
|---|---|---|---|---|---|---|
| September 22 | | Simpson* | Drake Stadium; Des Moines, IA | T 6–6 | | |
| September 28 | | Utah* | Drake Stadium; Des Moines, IA | L 0–6 | | |
| October 6 | | Oklahoma A&M | Drake Stadium; Des Moines, IA | L 0–7 | | |
| October 13 | | at Army* | Michie Stadium; West Point, NY | L 0–48 | | |
| October 19 | 8:15 p.m. | Grinnell | Drake Stadium; Des Moines, IA | W 8–0 | | |
| October 27 | 8:15 p.m. | at Washington University | Francis Field; St. Louis, MO | L 0–20 | 7,884 | |
| November 3 | 2:00 p.m. | Haskell*^{†} | Drake Stadium; Des Moines, IA | W 20–7 | 1,700 | |
| November 10 | | at Denver* | Denver, CO | L 7–8 | | |
| November 17 | | at Iowa State* | State Field; Ames, IA | L 12–33 | | |
| November 24 | | Creighton | Drake Stadium; Des Moines, IA | W 6–0 | | |
*Non-conference game; ^{†}Homecoming; All times are in Central time
