= 1934 Bowling Green Falcons football team =

American college football season

1934 Bowling Green Falcons football
- Conference: Ohio Athletic Conference
- Record: 2–3–2 (2–3–2 OAC)
- Head coach: Warren Steller (11th season)
- Captain: Robert Lewis

1934 Ohio Athletic Conference football standings
	Conf.					Overall
Team	W		L		T	W		L		T
Wooster $	8	–	0	–	0	8	–	1	–	0
Denison	6	–	0	–	1	6	–	1	–	1
Baldwin–Wallace	5	–	0	–	0	7	–	1	–	0
Ohio Northern	5	–	0	–	1	6	–	0	–	1
Xavier	2	–	0	–	0	6	–	2	–	1
Dayton	1	–	0	–	1	4	–	3	–	1
Toledo	4	–	1	–	0	5	–	3	–	0
Muskingum	4	–	2	–	1	5	–	3	–	1
Case	3	–	2	–	2	4	–	3	–	2
Mount Union	4	–	3	–	0	4	–	4	–	0
John Carroll	1	–	1	–	2	5	–	2	–	2
Akron	3	–	4	–	0	3	–	4	–	1
Heidelberg	3	–	4	–	0	3	–	5	–	0
Kent State	2	–	3	–	3	2	–	3	–	3
Bowling Green	2	–	3	–	2	2	–	3	–	2
Marietta	1	–	3	–	2	2	–	3	–	2
Capital	2	–	5	–	0	2	–	5	–	0
Hiram	2	–	5	–	0	2	–	5	–	0
Oberlin	1	–	3	–	1	2	–	5	–	1
Ashland	1	–	4	–	1	2	–	6	–	1
Wittenberg	1	–	5	–	0	2	–	7	–	0
Otterbein	1	–	6	–	0	2	–	7	–	0
Findlay	0	–	2	–	0	3	–	3	–	0
Kenyon	0	–	6	–	1	0	–	7	–	1
$ – Conference champion

The 1934 Bowling Green Falcons football team was an American football team that represented Bowling Green State College (later renamed Bowling Green State University) in the Ohio Athletic Conference (OAC) during the 1934 college football season. In their 11th season under head coach Warren Steller, the Falcons compiled a 2–3–2 record (overall and against conference opponents), finished in 13th place out of 22 teams in the OAC, and were outscored by a total of 54 to 36. Robert Lewis was the team captain.

== Schedule ==
Date	Opponent	Site	Result	Attendance	Source
September 29	at Mount Union	Alliance, OH	L 0–12		
October 6	Otterbein	Bowling Green, OH	W 20–7		
October 13	Kent State	Bowling Green, OH (rivalry)	T 0–0		
October 20	at Hiram	Hiram, OH	L 3–13		
October 27	at Capital	Bexey, OH	W 13–0		
November 3	Toledo^{†}	Bowling Green, OH (rivalry)	L 0–22	3,000-3,500	
November 10	Ohio Northern	Bowling Green, OH	T 0–0		
^{†}Homecoming
