= 1934 Dayton Flyers football team =

American college football season

1934 Dayton Flyers football
- Conference: Ohio Athletic Conference
- Record: 4–3–1 (1–0–1 OAC)
- Head coach: Harry Baujan (12th season)
- Home stadium: University of Dayton Stadium

1934 Ohio Athletic Conference football standings
	Conf.					Overall
Team	W		L		T	W		L		T
Wooster $	8	–	0	–	0	8	–	1	–	0
Denison	6	–	0	–	1	6	–	1	–	1
Baldwin–Wallace	5	–	0	–	0	7	–	1	–	0
Ohio Northern	5	–	0	–	1	6	–	0	–	1
Xavier	2	–	0	–	0	6	–	2	–	1
Dayton	1	–	0	–	1	4	–	3	–	1
Toledo	4	–	1	–	0	5	–	3	–	0
Muskingum	4	–	2	–	1	5	–	3	–	1
Case	3	–	2	–	2	4	–	3	–	2
Mount Union	4	–	3	–	0	4	–	4	–	0
John Carroll	1	–	1	–	2	5	–	2	–	2
Akron	3	–	4	–	0	3	–	4	–	1
Heidelberg	3	–	4	–	0	3	–	5	–	0
Kent State	2	–	3	–	3	2	–	3	–	3
Bowling Green	2	–	3	–	2	2	–	3	–	2
Marietta	1	–	3	–	2	2	–	3	–	2
Capital	2	–	5	–	0	2	–	5	–	0
Hiram	2	–	5	–	0	2	–	5	–	0
Oberlin	1	–	3	–	1	2	–	5	–	1
Ashland	1	–	4	–	1	2	–	6	–	1
Wittenberg	1	–	5	–	0	2	–	7	–	0
Otterbein	1	–	6	–	0	2	–	7	–	0
Findlay	0	–	2	–	0	3	–	3	–	0
Kenyon	0	–	6	–	1	0	–	7	–	1
$ – Conference champion

The 1934 Dayton Flyers football team was an American football team that represented the University of Dayton as a member of the Ohio Athletic Conference during the 1934 college football season. In its 12th season under head coach Harry Baujan, the team compiled a 4–3–1 record.

== Schedule ==
Date	Opponent	Site	Result	Attendance	Source
September 28	Morris Harvey*	University of Dayton Stadium; Dayton, OH	W 31–14		
October 5	Ohio Wesleyan*	University of Dayton Stadium; Dayton, OH	L 0–22	6,500	
October 12	at DePaul*	Loyola Field; Chicago, IL	L 6–12		
October 20	Adrian*	University of Dayton Stadium; Dayton, OH	W 70–0		
October 28	at Canisius*	Buffalo, NY	W 6–0		
November 10	John Carroll^{†}	University of Dayton Stadium; Dayton, OH	T 0–0		
November 17	Ohio*	University of Dayton Stadium; Dayton, OH	L 0–17		
November 29	Wittenberg	University of Dayton Stadium; Dayton, OH	W 27–0		
*Non-conference game; ^{†}Homecoming
