= 1934 Iowa State Cyclones football team =

American college football season

1934 Iowa State Cyclones football
- Conference: Big Six Conference
- Record: 5–3–1 (1–3–1 Big 6)
- Head coach: George F. Veenker (4th season)
- Captain: Don Theophilus
- Home stadium: State Field

1934 Big Six Conference football standings
	Conf.					Overall
Team	W		L		T	W		L		T
Kansas State $	5	–	0	–	0	7	–	2	–	1
Nebraska	4	–	1	–	0	6	–	3	–	0
Oklahoma	2	–	2	–	1	3	–	4	–	2
Kansas	1	–	2	–	2	3	–	4	–	3
Iowa State	1	–	3	–	1	5	–	3	–	1
Missouri	0	–	5	–	0	0	–	8	–	1
$ – Conference champion

The 1934 Iowa State Cyclones football team represented Iowa State College of Agricultural and Mechanic Arts (later renamed Iowa State University) in the Big Six Conference during the 1934 college football season. In their fourth season under head coach George F. Veenker, the Cyclones compiled a 5–3–1 record (1–3–1 against conference opponents), finished in fifth place in the conference, and outscored opponents by a combined total of 132 to 66. They played their home games at State Field in Ames, Iowa.

Don Theophilus was the team captain. Four Iowa State players were selected as first-team all-conference players: guard Ike Hayes, ends Frank Hood and Fred Poole, and back Harold Miller.

== Schedule ==
Date	Time	Opponent	Site	Result	Attendance	Source
September 29	2:00 pm	Luther*	State Field; Ames, IA	W 23–3	3,534	
October 6	2:00 pm	Grinnell*	State Field; Ames, IA	W 26–6	3,921	
October 13	2:00 pm	at Missouri	Memorial Stadium; Columbia, MO (rivalry)	W 13–0	5,458	
October 20	2:00 pm	Iowa*	State Field; Ames, IA (rivalry)	W 31–6	16,576	
October 27	2:00 pm	at Nebraska	Memorial Stadium; Lincoln, NE (rivalry)	L 6–7	23,277–24,320	
November 3	2:00 pm	Kansas^{†}	State Field; Ames, IA	T 0–0	5,843	
November 10	2:30 pm	at Oklahoma	Oklahoma Memorial Stadium; Norman, OK	L 0–12	8,000	
November 17	2:00 pm	Drake*	State Field; Ames, IA	W 33–12	5,870	
November 24	2:00 pm	at Kansas State	Memorial Stadium; Manhattan, KS (rivalry)	L 0–20	7,800	
*Non-conference game; ^{†}Homecoming; All times are in Central time

== Roster ==
1934 Iowa State Cyclones football roster
- 21 Williams Allender - Fullback (Junior)
- 22 Howard Harlan - Halfback (Senior)
- 23 Harold Miller - Quarterback (Senior)
- 24 Dwight Garner - Center (Senior)
- 25 Tommy Neal - Quarterback (Sophomore)
- 27 Russell Gute - Guard (Senior)
- 28 Wilbur Kroeger - End (Junior)
- 29 Norris Frantz - Guard (Sophomore)
- 30 Glenn Fitch - End (Sophomore)
- 31 John Catron - Tackle (Junior)
- 32 Russell Norgordt - Tackle (Sophomore)
- 33 Hunter Brown - Center (Sophomore)
- 34 Frank Hood - End (Senior)
- 35 Charles Hanna - Center (Sophomore)
- 36 Harold Schafroth - Tackle (Sophomore)
- 38 Marvin Oberg - Tackle (Sophomore)
- 39 Donald Grefe - End (Junior)
- 43 Vernon Loyd - Tackle (Senior)
- 44 William Monlux - Tackle (Sophomore)
- 45 Douglas McPeak - Fullback (Sophomore)
- 51 Joseph Borg - Center (Sophomore)
- 52 Fred Poole - End (Sophomore)
- 53 Robert Peck - End (Sophomore)
- 54 Clarence Gustine - End (Sophomore)
- 56 Ike Hayes - Guard (Junior)
- 57 Wilbur Winter - Halfback (Senior)
- 58 Richard Brisbin - Halfback (Sophomore)
- 59 Russell Coundiff - Guard (Sophomore)
- 60 Ed Blumenstein - Guard (Sophomore)
- 61 Don Theophilus - Halfback (Senior) (C)
- 63 Harold Birney - Fullback (Sophomore)
- 66 Wyman Maulsby - Halfback (Sophomore)
- 69 Kenneth Ames - End (Junior)
- 71 Marlowe Williams - Halfback (Senior)
- 73 Paul Berger - Guard (Senior)
- 99 John Massa - End (Sophomore)

== Coaching staff ==
Name	Position	Year at Iowa State	Previous job
George Veenker	Head coach	4th	Michigan
Joe Truskowski	Assistant Varsity Coach	3rd	Olivet
