= 1934 Toledo Rockets football team =

American college football season

1934 Toledo Rockets football
- Conference: Ohio Athletic Conference
- Record: 5–3 (4–1 OAC)
- Head coach: Jim Nicholson (4th season)
- Captain: Ed Smolinski
- Home stadium: Swayne Field

1934 Ohio Athletic Conference football standings
	Conf.					Overall
Team	W		L		T	W		L		T
Wooster $	8	–	0	–	0	8	–	1	–	0
Denison	6	–	0	–	1	6	–	1	–	1
Baldwin–Wallace	5	–	0	–	0	7	–	1	–	0
Ohio Northern	5	–	0	–	1	6	–	0	–	1
Xavier	2	–	0	–	0	6	–	2	–	1
Dayton	1	–	0	–	1	4	–	3	–	1
Toledo	4	–	1	–	0	5	–	3	–	0
Muskingum	4	–	2	–	1	5	–	3	–	1
Case	3	–	2	–	2	4	–	3	–	2
Mount Union	4	–	3	–	0	4	–	4	–	0
John Carroll	1	–	1	–	2	5	–	2	–	2
Akron	3	–	4	–	0	3	–	4	–	1
Heidelberg	3	–	4	–	0	3	–	5	–	0
Kent State	2	–	3	–	3	2	–	3	–	3
Bowling Green	2	–	3	–	2	2	–	3	–	2
Marietta	1	–	3	–	2	2	–	3	–	2
Capital	2	–	5	–	0	2	–	5	–	0
Hiram	2	–	5	–	0	2	–	5	–	0
Oberlin	1	–	3	–	1	2	–	5	–	1
Ashland	1	–	4	–	1	2	–	6	–	1
Wittenberg	1	–	5	–	0	2	–	7	–	0
Otterbein	1	–	6	–	0	2	–	7	–	0
Findlay	0	–	2	–	0	3	–	3	–	0
Kenyon	0	–	6	–	1	0	–	7	–	1
$ – Conference champion

The 1934 Toledo Rockets football team was an American football team that represented Toledo University in the Ohio Athletic Conference during the 1934 college football season. In their fourth season under head coach Jim Nicholson, the Rockets compiled a 5–3 record.

== Schedule ==
Date	Opponent	Site	Result	Source
September 29	Capital	Swayne Field; Toledo, OH	W 20–0	
October 6	Western Reserve*	Swayne Field; Toledo, OH	L 0–7	
October 13	Louisville*	Swayne Field; Toledo, OH	W 19–7	
October 20	Kenyon	Swayne Field; Toledo, OH	W 40–0	
October 27	at Buffalo*	Rotary Field; Buffalo, NY	L 0–8	
November 3	at Bowling Green	Bowling Green, OH (rivalry)	W 22–0	
November 10	at Muskingum	New Concord, OH	W 9–0	
November 23	Case	Swayne Field; Toledo, OH	L 13–33	
*Non-conference game
