= 1934 Michigan State Spartans football team =

American college football season

1934 Michigan State Spartans football
- Conference: Independent
- Record: 8–1
- Head coach: Charlie Bachman (2nd season)
- Offensive scheme: Notre Dame Box
- MVP: Ed Klewicki
- Captain: Russell H. Reynolds
- Home stadium: College Field

1934 Midwestern college football independents records
	Conf.			Overall
Team	W	L	T	W		L		T
Michigan State		–		8	–	1	–	0
Wayne		–		7	–	1	–	0
Western State Teachers (MI)		–		7	–	1	–	0
Michigan State Normal		–		5	–	2	–	0
Notre Dame		–		6	–	3	–	0
Central State (MI)		–		5	–	3	–	0
Detroit		–		5	–	3	–	1
DePaul		–		4	–	3	–	0
Saint Louis		–		3	–	3	–	2
Marquette		–		4	–	5	–	0
Michigan Tech		–		1	–	2	–	1
Haskell		–		3	–	6	–	1
Missouri Mines		–		2	–	6	–	0
Wittenberg		–		2	–	7	–	0

The 1934 Michigan State Spartans football team was an American football team that represented Michigan State College (now known as Michigan State University as an independent during the 1934 college football season. In their second season under head coach Charlie Bachman, the Spartans compiled an 8–1 record and outscored opponents by a total of 153 to 56. It was Michigan State's most successful football season since the undefeated 1913 season.

The Spartans won their annual rivalry game with Michigan by a 16 to 0 score. In inter-sectional play, the team defeated Carnegie Tech (13–0), Manhattan (39–0), Kansas (6–0), and Texas A&M (26–13), but lost to Syracuse (10–0).

Key players included left halfback and triple-threat player Kurt Warmbein, fullback Art Brandstetter Sr., quarterback Russ Reynolds, guard Sid Wagner, and end Ed Klewicki. Warmbein was selected as the 1934 "Man of the Year" among football players in Michigan.

== Schedule ==
Date	Opponent	Site	Result	Attendance	Source
September 29	Grinnell	College Field; East Lansing, MI	W 33–20	15,000	
October 6	at Michigan	Michigan Stadium; Ann Arbor, MI (rivalry)	W 16–0	30,000	
October 13	Carnegie Tech	College Field; East Lansing, MI	W 13–0	13,000	
October 20	at Manhattan	Ebbetts Field; Brooklyn, NY	W 39–0	18,000	
November 3	Marquette^{†}	College Field; East Lansing, MI	W 13–7	13,000	
November 10	at Syracuse	Archbold Stadium; Syracuse, NY	L 0–10	25,000	
November 17	Detroit	College Field; East Lansing, MI	W 7–6	20,000	
November 24	at Kansas	Memorial Stadium; Lawrence, KS	W 6–0	6,852	
December 8	vs. Texas A&M	San Antonio, TX	W 26–13		
^{†}Homecoming
