= 1934 Kent State Golden Flashes football team =

American college football season

1934 Kent State Golden Flashes football
- Conference: Ohio Athletic Conference
- Record: 2–3–3 (2–3–3 OAC)
- Head coach: Joe Begala (2nd season)
- Home stadium: Rockwell Field

1934 Ohio Athletic Conference football standings
	Conf.					Overall
Team	W		L		T	W		L		T
Wooster $	8	–	0	–	0	8	–	1	–	0
Denison	6	–	0	–	1	6	–	1	–	1
Baldwin–Wallace	5	–	0	–	0	7	–	1	–	0
Ohio Northern	5	–	0	–	1	6	–	0	–	1
Xavier	2	–	0	–	0	6	–	2	–	1
Dayton	1	–	0	–	1	4	–	3	–	1
Toledo	4	–	1	–	0	5	–	3	–	0
Muskingum	4	–	2	–	1	5	–	3	–	1
Case	3	–	2	–	2	4	–	3	–	2
Mount Union	4	–	3	–	0	4	–	4	–	0
John Carroll	1	–	1	–	2	5	–	2	–	2
Akron	3	–	4	–	0	3	–	4	–	1
Heidelberg	3	–	4	–	0	3	–	5	–	0
Kent State	2	–	3	–	3	2	–	3	–	3
Bowling Green	2	–	3	–	2	2	–	3	–	2
Marietta	1	–	3	–	2	2	–	3	–	2
Capital	2	–	5	–	0	2	–	5	–	0
Hiram	2	–	5	–	0	2	–	5	–	0
Oberlin	1	–	3	–	1	2	–	5	–	1
Ashland	1	–	4	–	1	2	–	6	–	1
Wittenberg	1	–	5	–	0	2	–	7	–	0
Otterbein	1	–	6	–	0	2	–	7	–	0
Findlay	0	–	2	–	0	3	–	3	–	0
Kenyon	0	–	6	–	1	0	–	7	–	1
$ – Conference champion

The 1934 Kent State Golden Flashes football team was an American football team that represented Kent State College (later renamed Kent State University) in the Ohio Athletic Conference (OAC) during the 1934 college football season. In its second season under head coach Joe Begala, Kent State compiled a 2–3–3 record.

== Schedule ==
Date	Opponent	Site	Result	Attendance	Source
September 28	at Muskingum	New Concord, OH	T 6–6		
October 5	at Akron	Buchtel Field; Akron, OH (rivalry)	L 0–26	5,500	
October 13	at Bowling Green	Bowling Green, OH (rivalry)	T 0–0		
October 20	Otterbein	Rockwell Field; Kent, OH	W 7–6		
October 27	Ashland	Rockwell Field; Kent, OH	T 0–0		
November 3	Hiram	Rockwell Field; Kent, OH	W 26–6		
November 10	Baldwin–Wallace	Rockwell Field; Kent, OH	L 0–39		
November 17	at Mount Union	Alliance, OH	L 6–7		
