= Joe Begala =

American football and wrestling coach

Biographical details
- Born: March 4, 1906; Struthers, Ohio, U.S.
- Died: April 24, 1978 (aged 72); Ravenna, Ohio, U.S.
- Education: Ohio University

Coaching career (HC unless noted)

Football
- 1933–1934: Kent State

Wrestling
- 1929–1972: Kent State

Head coaching record
- Overall: 4–5–6 (football); 307–69–5 (wrestling duals)

Joseph W. Begala (March 4, 1906 – April 24, 1978) was an American college football and collegiate wrestling coach. He served as the head football coach at Kent State University in Kent, Ohio from 1933 to 1934, compiling a record of 4–5–6. He also served as Kent State's wrestling coach, amassing a dual match record of 307–69–5. Begala died on April 24, 1978, at Robinson Memorial Hospital in Ravenna, Ohio.

== Head coaching record ==
=== Football ===
Year	Team	Overall	Conference	Standing	Bowl/playoffs
Kent State Golden Flashes (Ohio Athletic Conference) (1933–1934)
1933	Kent State	2–2–3	2–2–3	T–9th	
1934	Kent State	2–3–3	2–3–3	T–14th	
Kent State:		4–5–6	4–5–6		
Total:		4–5–6			
