= 1934 Michigan State Normal Hurons football team =

American college football season

1934 Michigan State Normal Hurons football
- Conference: Independent
- Record: 5–2
- Head coach: Elton Rynearson (13th season)
- Captain: Charles H. Earl
- Home stadium: Normal Field

1934 Midwestern college football independents records
	Conf.			Overall
Team	W	L	T	W		L		T
Michigan State		–		8	–	1	–	0
Wayne		–		7	–	1	–	0
Western State Teachers (MI)		–		7	–	1	–	0
Michigan State Normal		–		5	–	2	–	0
Notre Dame		–		6	–	3	–	0
Central State (MI)		–		5	–	3	–	0
Detroit		–		5	–	3	–	1
DePaul		–		4	–	3	–	0
Saint Louis		–		3	–	3	–	2
Marquette		–		4	–	5	–	0
Michigan Tech		–		1	–	2	–	1
Haskell		–		3	–	6	–	1
Missouri Mines		–		2	–	6	–	0
Wittenberg		–		2	–	7	–	0

The 1934 Michigan State Normal Hurons football team was an American football team that represented Michigan State Normal College (later renamed Eastern Michigan University) as an independent during the 1934 college football season. In their 13th season under head coach Elton Rynearson, the Hurons compiled a record of 5–2 and outscored their opponents by a combined total of 109 to 79. Charles H. Earl was the team captain. The team played its home games at Normal Field on the school's campus in Ypsilanti, Michigan.

== Schedule ==
Date	Opponent	Site	Result	Attendance	Source
October 6	Northern Michigan	Ypsilanti, MI	W 26–6		
October 13	at Iowa State Teachers	Cedar Falls, IA	L 0–33		
October 20	at Central State (MI)	Alumni Field; Mount Pleasant, MI (rivalry)	L 12–13	1,100	
October 27	Alma	Ypsilanti, MI	W 15–6		
November 3	St. Viator^{†}	Ypsilanti, MI	W 13–0	6,000	
November 10	Ferris Institute	Ypsilanti, MI	W 9–7		
November 17	at Indiana State	Terre Haute, IN	W 34–14		
^{†}Homecoming

== Game summaries ==
The Hurons opened their 1934 season on October 6 with a 26–6 victory over Northern State Teachers College (now known as Northern Michigan University). The game was played in Ypsilanti. Hanneman blocked a punt in the first quarter to set up the Hurons' first touchdown. An interception and a fumble set up the next two Huron touchdowns. Parker scored two touchdowns, and LeBlond and Dirkse each scored one.

On October 13, 1934, the Hurons lost to Iowa State Teachers College (now known as the University of Northern Iowa) by a 38 to 0 score. The game was played in Cedar Falls, Iowa.

On October 20, 1934, the Hurons lost a close game to Central State Teachers College (later renamed Central Michigan University) by a score of 13 to 12. The game was played in the rain in Mount Pleasant, Michigan. The Hurons led 12 to 6 after two touchdowns by Hanneman in the first and third quarters. Central drove for the winning touchdown late in the final minute of the fourth quarter.

On November 3, 1934, the school's homecoming game was played against St. Viator College. The homecoming celebration included a parade, class games, an interscholastic run, the football game, and a dance. The football game was played in front of a crowd of 6,000 alumni and students at Briggs Field. Parker and Hanneman scored touchdowns for the Hurons in a 13–0 victory.

On November 10, 1934, the Hurons defeated Ferris Institute by a 9–7 score at Briggs Field in Ypsilanti. The Hurons opened the scoring in the first quarter when end Christy Wilson "blocked a Bulldog punt with his face" and the ball bounced into the end zone for a safety. The Hurons scored a touchdown in the second quarter on a short run by Watson Welever. The touchdown was set up by a Ferris fumble that was recovered by the Hurons at the Ferris 20-yard line.

On November 17, 1934, the Hurons concluded their 1934 season with a 34–14 victory over Indiana State. Fullback Homer H. Parker scored three touchdowns for the Hurons. The game was played at Terre Haute, Indiana.

== Players ==
- Alexander, Edward J. 1933, ‘34, ‘35
- Angell, Karl Arthur ‘34
- Arnold, Robert N. 1932, ‘33, ‘34
- Bernard, Edward P. 1934, ‘35, ‘36
- Bloom, Joseph 1934
- Bugajewski, Bernard 1931, ‘32, ‘33, ’34
- Daskiewicz, Zygfried 1934, ‘35
- Dirkse, James W. 1932, ‘33, ‘34
- Earl, Charles H. 1932, ‘33, ‘34
- Ecclestone, John S. 1933, ‘34
- Hanneman, Charles B. 1933, ‘34, ‘35
- Heidamus, Lester W. 1934
- Jarosch, Col. Robert W. 1933, ‘34, ‘35
- LeBlond, John E. 1933, ‘34
- Matthews, Dr. James G. 1934
- Moroz, George A. 1934
- Newman, Ferris E. 1932, ‘34, ‘35
- Parker, Homer H. 1933, ‘34, ‘35
- Rock, Donald E. 1934, ‘35
- Rove, Nicholas R. 1932, ‘33, ‘34, ‘35
- Sabbath, Clarence B. 1934, ‘35, ‘36
- Welever, Watson A. 1933, ‘34
- Wilson, W. Christopher 1934, ‘35, ‘36
- Wilson, Robert C. 1932, ‘33, ‘34
