= 1934 Central State Bearcats football team =

American college football season

1934 Central State Bearcats football
- Conference: Independent
- Record: 5–3
- Head coach: Alex Yunevich (1st season)
- Home stadium: Alumni Field

1934 Midwestern college football independents records
	Conf.			Overall
Team	W	L	T	W		L		T
Michigan State		–		8	–	1	–	0
Wayne		–		7	–	1	–	0
Western State Teachers (MI)		–		7	–	1	–	0
Michigan State Normal		–		5	–	2	–	0
Notre Dame		–		6	–	3	–	0
Central State (MI)		–		5	–	3	–	0
Detroit		–		5	–	3	–	1
DePaul		–		4	–	3	–	0
Saint Louis		–		3	–	3	–	2
Marquette		–		4	–	5	–	0
Michigan Tech		–		1	–	2	–	1
Haskell		–		3	–	6	–	1
Missouri Mines		–		2	–	6	–	0
Wittenberg		–		2	–	7	–	0

The 1934 Central State Bearcats football team was an American football team that represented Central State Teachers College, later renamed Central Michigan University, as an independent during the 1934 college football season. In their first season under head coach Alex Yunevich, the Bearcats compiled a 5–3 record and were outscored by their opponents by a combined total of 82 to 81. The team defeated in-state rival Michigan State Normal (13–12) but lost to rival Western State Teachers (13–0). The team's worst defeat was by a 38–0 score against Gus Dorais' Detroit Titans.

Yunevich was hired as the head football coach at Central State in May 1934 after George Van Bibber accepted the head coaching position at the University at Buffalo. Both Yunevich and Van Biber were alumni of Purdue University. Yunevich had been an assistant coach at Central States under Van Bibber.

== Schedule ==
Date	Opponent	Site	Result	Attendance	Source
September 28	at Detroit	University of Detroit Stadium; Detroit, MI	L 0–38	11,000	
October 6	Ferris Institute	Alumni Field; Mount Pleasant, MI	L 2–6		
October 13	Hillsdale	Alumni Field; Mount Pleasant, MI	W 15–6		
October 20	Michigan State Normal^{†}	Alumni Field; Mount Pleasant, MI (rivalry)	W 13–12	1,100	
October 27	at Wayne	Kelsey Field; Detroit, MI	W 13–7		
November 3	at Western State Teachers	Western State Teachers College Field; Kalamazoo, MI (rivalry)	L 0–13		
November 10	Kalamazoo	Alumni Field; Mount Pleasant, MI	W 12–0		
November 17	at Alma	Alma, MI	W 26–0		
^{†}Homecoming
