= 1934 Colorado Buffaloes football team =

American college football season

1934 Colorado Buffaloes football

RMC co-champion
- Conference: Rocky Mountain Conference
- Record: 6–1–2 (6–1 RMC)
- Head coach: Bill Saunders (3rd season)
- Captain: Game captains
- Home stadium: Colorado Stadium

1934 Rocky Mountain Conference football standings
	Conf.					Overall
Team	W		L		T	W		L		T
Colorado Teachers +	6	–	1	–	0	6	–	1	–	0
Colorado +	6	–	1	–	0	6	–	1	–	2
Colorado Agricultural +	6	–	1	–	1	6	–	2	–	1
Utah State	5	–	1	–	1	5	–	1	–	1
Utah	4	–	2	–	0	5	–	3	–	0
Denver	4	–	4	–	0	5	–	5	–	1
BYU	3	–	5	–	0	4	–	5	–	0
Wyoming	2	–	4	–	0	3	–	5	–	0
Colorado College	1	–	6	–	0	1	–	7	–	0
Colorado Mines	1	–	6	–	0	1	–	6	–	0
Western State (CO)	0	–	3	–	0	2	–	5	–	0
Montana State	0	–	4	–	0	2	–	5	–	0
+ – Conference co-champions

The 1934 Colorado Buffaloes football team was an American football team that represented the University of Colorado as a member of the Rocky Mountain Conference (RMC) during the 1934 college football season. In its third and final year under head coach Bill Saunders, the team compiled a 6–1–2 record (6–1 against RMC opponents), finished in a three-way tie for the conference championship, and outscored all opponents by a total of 167 to 40.

Quarterback Kayo Lam led the team with 906 rushing yards and 8.24 yards per rush. On October 27, 1934, Lam rushed for 232 yards against Colorado Agricultural, a total that remained a school record for 20 years. He also had a 91-yard run against BYU that also remained a school record until 1954.

In November 1934, the school adopted the nickname "Buffaloes" for its football team. The name was selected as part of a contest conducted by the school's student newspaper. Andrew J. Dickson was credited with submitting the winning name.

== Schedule ==
Date	Opponent	Site	Result	Attendance	Source
September 29	at Kansas*	Memorial Stadium; Lawrence, KS	T 0–0	7,500	
October 6	Missouri*	Colorado Stadium; Boulder, CO	T 0–0		
October 12	at Colorado Teachers	Jackson Field; Greeley, CO	L 7–13	5,894	
October 20	vs. BYU	Ogden Stadium; Ogden, UT	W 48–6		
October 27	Colorado Agricultural	Colorado Stadium; Boulder, CO (rivalry)	W 27–9		
November 3	at Colorado Mines	Brooks Field; Golden, CO	W 40–6		
November 10	Utah^{†}	Colorado Stadium; Boulder, CO (rivalry)	W 7–6	15,000	
November 17	at Colorado College	Washburn Field; Colorado Springs, CO	W 31–0		
November 29	at Denver	DU Stadium; Denver, CO	W 7–0		
*Non-conference game; ^{†}Homecoming
