= 1933 Xavier Musketeers football team =

American college football season

1933 Xavier Musketeers football
- Conference: Ohio Athletic Conference
- Record: 5–4 (1–0 OAC)
- Head coach: Joseph A. Meyer (14th season)
- Home stadium: Corcoran Field

1933 Ohio Athletic Conference football standings
	Conf.					Overall
Team	W		L		T	W		L		T
Dayton $	3	–	0	–	1	8	–	2	–	1
Wooster	7	–	1	–	1	7	–	1	–	1
Akron	5	–	2	–	1	5	–	3	–	1
Case	5	–	2	–	0	5	–	3	–	1
Muskingum	4	–	2	–	1	5	–	2	–	1
Baldwin–Wallace	4	–	2	–	1	5	–	3	–	1
Toledo	3	–	2	–	1	5	–	2	–	1
John Carroll	3	–	2	–	2	5	–	2	–	2
Hiram	2	–	2	–	2	2	–	2	–	3
Kent State	2	–	2	–	3	2	–	2	–	3
Otterbein	3	–	4	–	1	3	–	4	–	1
Mount Union	3	–	4	–	1	3	–	5	–	1
Marietta	2	–	3	–	1	3	–	3	–	1
Heidelberg	2	–	3	–	2	2	–	5	–	2
Denison	2	–	3	–	1	2	–	6	–	1
Oberlin	2	–	3	–	0	4	–	4	–	0
Ashland	2	–	4	–	1	3	–	4	–	1
Bowling Green	1	–	3	–	2	2	–	3	–	2
Capital	1	–	4	–	2	1	–	4	–	2
Ohio Northern	0	–	4	–	1	0	–	5	–	2
Kenyon	0	–	5	–	1	1	–	5	–	1
Xavier *	1	–	0	–	0	5	–	4	–	0
$ – Conference champion; * – did not compete for championship

The 1933 Xavier Musketeers football team was an American football team that represented Xavier University as a member of the Ohio Athletic Conference (OAC) during the 1933 college football season. In their 14th year under head coach Joseph A. Meyer, the Musketeers compiled a 5–4 record.

== Schedule ==
Date	Time	Opponent	Site	Result	Attendance	Source
September 22		Transylvania*	Corcoran Field; Cincinnati, OH	W 31–0		
September 29		Kenyon	Corcoran Field; Cincinnati, OH	W 33–0	7,500	
October 6		Adrian*	Corcoran Field; Cincinnati, OH	W 32–0	7,500	
October 14		Carnegie Tech*	Corcoran Field; Cincinnati, OH	L 0–3	10,000	
October 20		Washington & Jefferson*	Corcoran Field; Cincinnati, OH	L 0–8		
October 28	2:30 p.m.	Centre*	Corcoran Field; Cincinnati, OH	L 0–7	6,500	
November 3		at Loyola (LA)*	Loyola Stadium; New Orleans, LA	L 0–7	9,000	
November 18		Indiana*	Corcoran Field; Cincinnati, OH	W 6–0		
November 30		Haskell*	Corcoran Field; Cincinnati, OH	W 24–13	10,500	
*Non-conference game; All times are in Eastern time
