= 1933 Akron Zippers football team =

American college football season

1933 Akron Zippers football
- Conference: Ohio Athletic Conference
- Record: 5–3–1 (5–2–1 OAC)
- Head coach: Red Blair (7th season)
- Captain: Wilson Sparhawk
- Home stadium: Buchtel Field

1933 Ohio Athletic Conference football standings
	Conf.					Overall
Team	W		L		T	W		L		T
Dayton $	3	–	0	–	1	8	–	2	–	1
Wooster	7	–	1	–	1	7	–	1	–	1
Akron	5	–	2	–	1	5	–	3	–	1
Case	5	–	2	–	0	5	–	3	–	1
Muskingum	4	–	2	–	1	5	–	2	–	1
Baldwin–Wallace	4	–	2	–	1	5	–	3	–	1
Toledo	3	–	2	–	1	5	–	2	–	1
John Carroll	3	–	2	–	2	5	–	2	–	2
Hiram	2	–	2	–	2	2	–	2	–	3
Kent State	2	–	2	–	3	2	–	2	–	3
Otterbein	3	–	4	–	1	3	–	4	–	1
Mount Union	3	–	4	–	1	3	–	5	–	1
Marietta	2	–	3	–	1	3	–	3	–	1
Heidelberg	2	–	3	–	2	2	–	5	–	2
Denison	2	–	3	–	1	2	–	6	–	1
Oberlin	2	–	3	–	0	4	–	4	–	0
Ashland	2	–	4	–	1	3	–	4	–	1
Bowling Green	1	–	3	–	2	2	–	3	–	2
Capital	1	–	4	–	2	1	–	4	–	2
Ohio Northern	0	–	4	–	1	0	–	5	–	2
Kenyon	0	–	5	–	1	1	–	5	–	1
Xavier *	1	–	0	–	0	5	–	4	–	0
$ – Conference champion; * – did not compete for championship

The 1933 Akron Zippers football team was an American football team that represented the University of Akron in the Ohio Athletic Conference during the 1933 college football season. In its seventh season under head coach Red Blair, the team compiled a 5–3–1 record (5–2–1 in conference) and outscored opponents by a total of 97 to 50. Wilson Sparhawk was the team captain.

== Schedule ==
Date	Opponent	Site	Result	Attendance	Source
September 30	Western Reserve*	Buchtel Field; Akron, OH	L 8–19	4,000	
October 7	at Kent State	Kent, OH (rivalry)	W 19–6		
October 14	Case	Buchtel Field; Akron, OH	L 0–19		
October 21	Wooster^{†}	Buchtel Field; Akron, OH	L 0–6		
October 28	Ashland	Buchtel Field; Akron, OH	W 13–0		
November 4	Muskingum	Buchtel Field; Akron, OH	W 15–0		
November 11	at Heidelberg	Tiffin, OH	T 0–0		
November 18	Baldwin–Wallace	Buchtel Field; Akron, OH	W 6–0		
November 25	at Mount Union	Alliance, OH	W 36–0		
*Non-conference game; ^{†}Homecoming
