= 1934 Washington University Bears football team =

American college football season

1934 Washington University Bears football

MVC champion
- Conference: Missouri Valley Conference
- Record: 7–3 (1–0 MVC)
- Head coach: Jimmy Conzelman (3rd season)
- Home stadium: Francis Field, Walsh Stadium

1934 Missouri Valley Conference football standings
	Conf.					Overall
Team	W		L		T	W		L		T
Washington University $	1	–	0	–	0	7	–	3	–	0
Creighton	2	–	1	–	0	2	–	7	–	0
Oklahoma A&M	1	–	1	–	0	4	–	5	–	1
Drake	2	–	2	–	0	3	–	6	–	1
Grinnell	0	–	2	–	0	2	–	7	–	0
$ – Conference champion

The 1934 Washington University Bears football team represented Washington University in St. Louis as a member of the Missouri Valley Conference (MVC) during the 1934 college football season. In its third season under head coach Jimmy Conzelman, the team compiled a 7–3 record, won the MVC championship, and outscored opponents by a total of 212 to 59. The team played home games at Francis Field in St. Louis.

== Schedule ==
Date	Time	Opponent	Site	Result	Attendance	Source
September 28	8:15 p.m.	McKendree*	Francis Field; St. Louis, MO	W 18–0	4,500	
October 6	2:30 p.m.	Illinois*	Francis Field; St. Louis, MO	L 7–12	12,000	
October 13	8:15 p.m.	Wabash*	Francis Field; St. Louis, MO	W 41–0	5,275	
October 19	8:15 p.m.	Simpson*	Francis Field; St. Louis, MO	W 27–0	5,024	
October 26	8:15 p.m.	Drake	Francis Field; St. Louis, MO	W 20–0	7,884	
November 3	2:00 p.m.	Butler*	Francis Field; St. Louis, MO	W 32–7	2,500	
November 10	2:00 p.m.	Kansas*^{†}	Francis Field; St. Louis, MO	L 0–13	7,902	
November 17		at Missouri*	Memorial Stadium; Columbia, MO	W 40–13	7,500	
November 29	2:00 p.m.	at Saint Louis*	Walsh Stadium; St. Louis, MO	W 27–7	18,000	
December 8	2:00 p.m.	SMU*	Walsh Stadium; St. Louis, MO	L 0–7	7,300	
*Non-conference game; ^{†}Homecoming; All times are in Central time
