= 1934 BYU Cougars football team =

American college football season

1934 BYU Cougars football
- Conference: Rocky Mountain Conference
- Record: 4–5 (3–5 RMC)
- Head coach: G. Ott Romney (7th season)

1934 Rocky Mountain Conference football standings
| | Conf. | | | | | Overall |
| Team | W | | L | | T | W | | L | | T |
|---|---|---|---|---|---|---|---|---|---|---|
| Colorado Teachers + | 6 | – | 1 | – | 0 | 6 | – | 1 | – | 0 |
| Colorado + | 6 | – | 1 | – | 0 | 6 | – | 1 | – | 2 |
| Colorado Agricultural + | 6 | – | 1 | – | 1 | 6 | – | 2 | – | 1 |
| Utah State | 5 | – | 1 | – | 1 | 5 | – | 1 | – | 1 |
| Utah | 4 | – | 2 | – | 0 | 5 | – | 3 | – | 0 |
| Denver | 4 | – | 4 | – | 0 | 5 | – | 5 | – | 1 |
| BYU | 3 | – | 5 | – | 0 | 4 | – | 5 | – | 0 |
| Wyoming | 2 | – | 4 | – | 0 | 3 | – | 5 | – | 0 |
| Colorado College | 1 | – | 6 | – | 0 | 1 | – | 7 | – | 0 |
| Colorado Mines | 1 | – | 6 | – | 0 | 1 | – | 6 | – | 0 |
| Western State (CO) | 0 | – | 3 | – | 0 | 2 | – | 5 | – | 0 |
| Montana State | 0 | – | 4 | – | 0 | 2 | – | 5 | – | 0 |
+ – Conference co-champions

The 1934 BYU Cougars football team was an American football team that represented Brigham Young University (BYU) as a member of the Rocky Mountain Conference (RMC) during the 1934 college football season. In their seventh season under head coach G. Ott Romney, the Cougars compiled an overall record of 4–5 with a mark of 3–5 against conference opponents, finishing seventh in the RMC, and were outscored by a total of 169 to 144.

== Schedule ==
| Date | Opponent | Site | Result | Source |
|---|---|---|---|---|
| September 22 | vs. Montana State | Memorial Stadium; Great Falls, MT | W 20–6 | |
| September 29 | Occidental* | Provo, UT | W 32–7 | |
| October 6 | at Wyoming | Corbett Field; Laramie, WY | L 7–0 | |
| October 13 | at Utah | Ute Stadium; Salt Lake City, UT (rivalry) | L 43–0 | |
| October 20 | vs. Colorado | Ogden Stadium; Ogden, UT | L 48–6 | |
| October 26 | Western State (CO) | Provo, UT | W 16–7 | |
| November 3 | Utah State | Provo, UT (rivalry) | L 15–0 | |
| November 10 | at Colorado College | Washburn Field; Colorado Springs, CO | W 34–0 | |
| November 17 | at Denver | DU Stadium; Denver, CO | L 24–6 | |
*Non-conference game
