= 1934 Oklahoma Sooners football team =

American college football season

1934 Oklahoma Sooners football
- Conference: Big Six Conference
- Record: 3–4–2 (2–2–1 Big 6)
- Head coach: Lewie Hardage (3rd season)
- Captain: Art Pansze
- Home stadium: Memorial Stadium

1934 Big Six Conference football standings
	Conf.					Overall
Team	W		L		T	W		L		T
Kansas State $	5	–	0	–	0	7	–	2	–	1
Nebraska	4	–	1	–	0	6	–	3	–	0
Oklahoma	2	–	2	–	1	3	–	4	–	2
Kansas	1	–	2	–	2	3	–	4	–	3
Iowa State	1	–	3	–	1	5	–	3	–	1
Missouri	0	–	5	–	0	0	–	8	–	1
$ – Conference champion

The 1934 Oklahoma Sooners football team represented the University of Oklahoma in the 1934 college football season. In their third year under head coach Lewie Hardage, the Sooners compiled a 3–4–2 record (2–2–1 against conference opponents), finished in third place in the Big Six Conference, and outscored their opponents by a combined total of 64 to 43.

Tackle Cassius Gentry received All-America honors in 1934, and four Sooners received all-conference honors: Gentry, guard James Stacy, back Ben Poyner, and tackle Dub Wheeler.

== Schedule ==
Date	Opponent	Site	Result	Attendance	Source
October 6	Centenary*	Memorial Stadium; Norman, OK	W 7–0	12,000	
October 13	vs. Texas*	Fair Park Stadium; Dallas, TX (rivalry)	L 0–19	21,000	
October 20	Nebraska	Memorial Stadium; Norman, OK (rivalry)	L 0–6	14,000	
October 27	at Kansas	Memorial Stadium; Lawrence, KS	T 7–7		
November 3	Missouri	Memorial Stadium; Norman, OK (rivalry)	W 31–0		
November 10	at Iowa State	Clyde Williams Field; Ames, IA	W 12–0	8,000	
November 17	Kansas State	Memorial Stadium; Norman, OK	L 7–8		
November 22	at Oklahoma A&M*	Lewis Field; Stillwater, OK (Bedlam)	T 0–0		
November 29	at George Washington*	Griffith Stadium; Washington, DC	L 0–3		
*Non-conference game
