= 1933 Dayton Flyers football team =

American college football season

1933 Dayton Flyers football

OAC champion
- Conference: Ohio Athletic Conference
- Record: 7–2–1 (3–0–1 OAC)
- Head coach: Harry Baujan (11th season)
- Home stadium: University of Dayton Stadium

1933 Ohio Athletic Conference football standings
	Conf.					Overall
Team	W		L		T	W		L		T
Dayton $	3	–	0	–	1	8	–	2	–	1
Wooster	7	–	1	–	1	7	–	1	–	1
Akron	5	–	2	–	1	5	–	3	–	1
Case	5	–	2	–	0	5	–	3	–	1
Muskingum	4	–	2	–	1	5	–	2	–	1
Baldwin–Wallace	4	–	2	–	1	5	–	3	–	1
Toledo	3	–	2	–	1	5	–	2	–	1
John Carroll	3	–	2	–	2	5	–	2	–	2
Hiram	2	–	2	–	2	2	–	2	–	3
Kent State	2	–	2	–	3	2	–	2	–	3
Otterbein	3	–	4	–	1	3	–	4	–	1
Mount Union	3	–	4	–	1	3	–	5	–	1
Marietta	2	–	3	–	1	3	–	3	–	1
Heidelberg	2	–	3	–	2	2	–	5	–	2
Denison	2	–	3	–	1	2	–	6	–	1
Oberlin	2	–	3	–	0	4	–	4	–	0
Ashland	2	–	4	–	1	3	–	4	–	1
Bowling Green	1	–	3	–	2	2	–	3	–	2
Capital	1	–	4	–	2	1	–	4	–	2
Ohio Northern	0	–	4	–	1	0	–	5	–	2
Kenyon	0	–	5	–	1	1	–	5	–	1
Xavier *	1	–	0	–	0	5	–	4	–	0
$ – Conference champion; * – did not compete for championship

The 1933 Dayton Flyers football team was an American football team that represented the University of Dayton as a member of the Ohio Athletic Conference during the 1933 college football season. In their 11th season under head coach Harry Baujan, the Flyers compiled an overall record of 7–2–1 with a mark of 3–0–1 in conference play, winning the OAC title.

== Schedule ==
Date	Time	Opponent	Site	Result	Attendance	Source
September 29		Adrian*	University of Dayton Stadium; Dayton, OH	W 14–0	5,500	
October 6		Ohio Wesleyan*	University of Dayton Stadium; Dayton, OH	L 10–22		
October 13		Heidelberg*	University of Dayton Stadium; Dayton, OH	W 7–0		
October 20		Findlay*	University of Dayton Stadium; Dayton, OH	W 13–12		
October 27		at John Carroll	Cleveland, OH	T 0–0	5,000	
November 4		Baldwin–Wallace	University of Dayton Stadium; Dayton, OH	W 6–0		
November 11	2:00 p.m.	West Virginia Wesleyan*	University of Dayton Stadium; Dayton, OH	W 7–6		
November 18		at Canisius*	Buffalo, NY	L 0–12	1,200	
November 25		Wittenberg*	University of Dayton Stadium; Dayton, OH	W 31–6		
December 2		Denison	University of Dayton Stadium; Dayton, OH	W 21–0		
*Non-conference game; All times are in Eastern time
