= 1933 Bowling Green Falcons football team =

American college football season

1933 Bowling Green Falcons football
- Conference: Ohio Athletic Conference
- Record: 2–3–2 (1–3–2 OAC)
- Head coach: Warren Steller (10th season)
- Captain: Henry Fearnside

1933 Ohio Athletic Conference football standings
	Conf.					Overall
Team	W		L		T	W		L		T
Dayton $	3	–	0	–	1	8	–	2	–	1
Wooster	7	–	1	–	1	7	–	1	–	1
Akron	5	–	2	–	1	5	–	3	–	1
Case	5	–	2	–	0	5	–	3	–	1
Muskingum	4	–	2	–	1	5	–	2	–	1
Baldwin–Wallace	4	–	2	–	1	5	–	3	–	1
Toledo	3	–	2	–	1	5	–	2	–	1
John Carroll	3	–	2	–	2	5	–	2	–	2
Hiram	2	–	2	–	2	2	–	2	–	3
Kent State	2	–	2	–	3	2	–	2	–	3
Otterbein	3	–	4	–	1	3	–	4	–	1
Mount Union	3	–	4	–	1	3	–	5	–	1
Marietta	2	–	3	–	1	3	–	3	–	1
Heidelberg	2	–	3	–	2	2	–	5	–	2
Denison	2	–	3	–	1	2	–	6	–	1
Oberlin	2	–	3	–	0	4	–	4	–	0
Ashland	2	–	4	–	1	3	–	4	–	1
Bowling Green	1	–	3	–	2	2	–	3	–	2
Capital	1	–	4	–	2	1	–	4	–	2
Ohio Northern	0	–	4	–	1	0	–	5	–	2
Kenyon	0	–	5	–	1	1	–	5	–	1
Xavier *	1	–	0	–	0	5	–	4	–	0
$ – Conference champion; * – did not compete for championship

The 1933 Bowling Green Falcons football team was an American football team that represented Bowling Green State College (later renamed Bowling Green State University) during the 1933 college football season. In their first season as a member of the Ohio Athletic Conference (OAC) and their tenth season under head coach Warren Steller, the Falcons compiled a 2–3–2 record (1–3–2 against OAC opponents), finished in 18th place in the OAC, and were outscored by a total of 91 to 44. Henry Fearnside was the team captain.

== Schedule ==
Date	Opponent	Site	Result	Attendance	Source
September 30	Mount Union	Bowling Green, OH	L 6–7		
October 7	Bluffton*	Bowling Green, OH	W 19–0		
October 14	at Baldwin–Wallace	Berea, OH	L 6–58		
October 21	at Ohio Northern	Ada, OH	W 6–0		
October 28	at Toledo	Toledo, OH (rivalry)	L 7–26		
November 4	Capital^{†}	Bowling Green, OH	T 0–0		
November 10	Hiram	Bowling Green, OH	T 0–0		
*Non-conference game; ^{†}Homecoming
