= 1934 Haskell Indians football team =

American college football season

1934 Haskell Indians football
- Conference: Independent
- Record: 3–6–1
- Head coach: Gus Welch (2nd season)
- Captain: Fred "Jug" Miles

1934 Midwestern college football independents records
	Conf.			Overall
Team	W	L	T	W		L		T
Michigan State		–		8	–	1	–	0
Wayne		–		7	–	1	–	0
Western State Teachers (MI)		–		7	–	1	–	0
Michigan State Normal		–		5	–	2	–	0
Notre Dame		–		6	–	3	–	0
Central State (MI)		–		5	–	3	–	0
Detroit		–		5	–	3	–	1
DePaul		–		4	–	3	–	0
Saint Louis		–		3	–	3	–	2
Marquette		–		4	–	5	–	0
Michigan Tech		–		1	–	2	–	1
Haskell		–		3	–	6	–	1
Missouri Mines		–		2	–	6	–	0
Wittenberg		–		2	–	7	–	0

The 1934 Haskell Indians football team was an American football that represented the Haskell Institute—now known as Haskell Indian Nations University—as an independent during the 1934 college football season. Led by Gus Welch in his second and final year as head coach, Haskell compiled a record of 3–6–1. Tackle Fred "Jug" Miles was the team captain.

== Schedule ==
Date	Time	Opponent	Site	Result	Attendance	Source
September 21		at Washburn	Topeka, KS	T 0–0		
September 28	7:30 p.m.	at Emporia Teachers	Stadium Field; Emporia, KS	L 0–6	2,000	
October 6	8:00 p.m.	at Creighton	Creighton Stadium; Omaha, NE	W 7–6		
October 12	8:00 p.m.	at Oklahoma A&M	Lewis Field; Stillwater, OK	L 6–9	7,500	
October 19	7:15 p.m.	at Duquesne	Forbes Field; Pittsburgh, PA	L 0–67	7,000	
October 26	8:00 p.m.	at Grinnell	Grinnell, IA	W 3–0		
November 3	2:00 p.m.	at Drake	Drake Stadium; Des Moines, IA	L 7–20	1,700	
November 12		South Dakota^{†}	Lawrence, KS	W 13–7	4,000	
November 24		at Roanoke	Maher Field; Roanoke, VA	W 0–13	2,500–3,000	
November 29	1:30 p.m.	at Xavier	Corcoran Field; Cincinnati, OH	L 6–38	8,000	
^{†}Homecoming; All times are in Central time
