= 1934 Creighton Bluejays football team =

American college football season

1934 Creighton Bluejays football
- Conference: Missouri Valley Conference
- Record: 2–7 (2–1 MVC)
- Head coach: Eddie Hickey (1st season)
- Home stadium: Creighton Stadium

1934 Missouri Valley Conference football standings
	Conf.					Overall
Team	W		L		T	W		L		T
Washington University $	1	–	0	–	0	7	–	3	–	0
Creighton	2	–	1	–	0	2	–	7	–	0
Oklahoma A&M	1	–	1	–	0	4	–	5	–	1
Drake	2	–	2	–	0	3	–	6	–	1
Grinnell	0	–	2	–	0	2	–	7	–	0
$ – Conference champion

The 1934 Creighton Bluejays football team was an American football team that represented Creighton University as a member of the Missouri Valley Conference (MVC) during the 1934 college football season. In its first and only season under head coach Eddie Hickey, the team compiled a 2–7 record (2–1 against MVC opponents) and was outscored by a total of 151 to 44. The team played its home games at Creighton Stadium in Omaha, Nebraska.

== Schedule ==
Date	Time	Opponent	Site	Result	Attendance	Source
September 29		South Dakota State*	Creighton Stadium; Omaha, NE	L 0–14		
October 6	8:00 p.m.	Haskell*	Creighton Stadium; Omaha, NE	L 6–7		
October 12		at Saint Louis*	Walsh Stadium; St. Louis, MO	L 0–13	7,000	
October 20		Rice*^{†}	Creighton Stadium; Omaha, NE	L 13–47	10,000	
October 26		at Oklahoma A&M	Lewis Field; Stillwater, OK	W 13–7		
November 3	2:30 p.m.	Grinnell	Creighton Stadium; Omaha, NE	W 12–6	3,000	
November 17		Marquette*	Creighton Stadium; Omaha, NE	L 0–38		
November 24		at Drake	Drake Stadium; Des Moines, IA	L 0–6		
November 29		Idaho*	Creighton Stadium; Omaha, NE	L 0–13	5,000	
*Non-conference game; ^{†}Homecoming; All times are in Central time
