= 1934 Nebraska Cornhuskers football team =

American college football season

1934 Nebraska Cornhuskers football
- Conference: Big Six Conference
- Record: 6–3 (4–1 Big 6)
- Head coach: Dana X. Bible (6th season)
- Home stadium: Memorial Stadium

1934 Big Six Conference football standings
| | Conf. | | | | | Overall |
| Team | W | | L | | T | W | | L | | T |
|---|---|---|---|---|---|---|---|---|---|---|
| Kansas State $ | 5 | – | 0 | – | 0 | 7 | – | 2 | – | 1 |
| Nebraska | 4 | – | 1 | – | 0 | 6 | – | 3 | – | 0 |
| Oklahoma | 2 | – | 2 | – | 1 | 3 | – | 4 | – | 2 |
| Kansas | 1 | – | 2 | – | 2 | 3 | – | 4 | – | 3 |
| Iowa State | 1 | – | 3 | – | 1 | 5 | – | 3 | – | 1 |
| Missouri | 0 | – | 5 | – | 0 | 0 | – | 8 | – | 1 |
$ – Conference champion

The 1934 Nebraska Cornhuskers football team was an American football team that represented the University of Nebraska in the Big Six Conference during the 1934 college football season. In its sixth season under head coach Dana X. Bible, the team compiled a 6–3 record (4–1 against conference opponents), finished in second place in the Big Six, and outscored opponents by a total of 106 to 89. The team played its home games at Memorial Stadium in Lincoln, Nebraska.

== Before the season ==
Coach Bible returned for a sixth year with many conference titles to his credit, but suffered the loss of all but one of his starting 1933 players to graduation, and was therefore breaking in a relatively inexperienced squad. Bible's length of tenure at Nebraska had thus far been a clear success, and his length of service now matched the stretch held by Walter C. Booth in his six years as coach from 1900 to 1905, which was at that time the longest in program history.

== Schedule ==
| Date | Time | Opponent | Site | Result | Attendance | Source |
|---|---|---|---|---|---|---|
| September 29 | 2:00 p.m. | Wyoming* | Memorial Stadium; Lincoln, NE | W 50–0 | 15,851 | |
| October 6 | 2:00 p.m. | at Minnesota* | Memorial Stadium; Minneapolis, MN (rivalry) | L 0–20 | 38,000 | |
| October 13 | 2:00 p.m. | Iowa* | Memorial Stadium; Lincoln, NE (rivalry) | W 14–13 | 34,769 | |
| October 20 | 3:00 p.m. | at Oklahoma | Memorial Stadium; Norman, OK (rivalry) | W 6–0 | 14,000 | |
| October 27 | 2:00 p.m. | Iowa State | Memorial Stadium; Lincoln, NE (rivalry) | W 7–6 | 24,277–24,320 | |
| November 10 | 2:00 p.m. | Pittsburgh | Memorial Stadium; Lincoln, NE | L 6–25 | 32,875–35,000 | |
| November 17 | 2:00 p.m. | at Kansas | Memorial Stadium; Lawrence, KS (rivalry) | W 3–0 | | |
| November 24 | 2:00 p.m. | Missouri^{†} | Memorial Stadium; Lincoln, NE (rivalry) | W 13–6 | | |
| November 29 | 2:00 p.m. | Kansas State | Memorial Stadium; Lincoln, NE (rivalry) | L 7–19 | | |
*Non-conference game; ^{†}Homecoming; All times are in Central time

== Roster ==
| Bauer, Henry #14 QB; Benson, Robert #26 HB; Cardwell, Lloyd #24 HB; DeBrown, Wallace #23 T Douglas, Ronald #29 FB; Eldridge, Ralph #18 HB; Flasnick, Don #28 E Francis, Sam #38 FB; Franks, Perry #20 G Garnick, William #40 G Heldt, James #32 G Holmbeck, Harold #34 T Horchem, Willard #36 C Hubka, Ladas #16 G Justice, Glenn #31 G LaNoue, Gerald #11 HB; McDonald, Lester #35 E | Mehring, Neal #30 G Meier, Franklin #21 C Parsons, Rollin #19 HB; Pflum, Walter #47 T Reese, Carroll #41 T Scherer, Bernard #44 E Scofield, Vernon #33 T Sears, Edgar #25 E Skewes, Glenn #17 FB; Thompson, John Russell #48 T Toman, Ray #27 E Turner, Allan #15 HB; Uptegrove, Ed #42 G White, Clyde #39 G Williams, John #22 FB; Yelkin, Virgil #12 E |

== Coaching staff ==
| Name | Title | First year in this position | Years at Nebraska | Alma mater |
|---|---|---|---|---|
| Dana X. Bible | Head Coach | 1929 | 1929–1936 | Carson-Newman |
| Henry Schulte | Lineman Coach | 1931 | 1919–1924, 1931–1937 | Michigan |
| Ed Weir | Freshmen Coach | 1929 | 1926, 1929–1937, 1943 | Nebraska |
| W. Harold Browne | Assistant Coach | 1930 | 1930–1940 | |
| McLean | | 1933 | 1933–1934 | |
| Houston | | 1934 | 1934 | |

== Game summaries ==
=== Wyoming ===
Wyoming at Nebraska

| Team | 1 | 2 | Total |
|---|---|---|---|
| Wyoming | | | 0 |
| • Nebraska | | | 50 |

- Date: September 29
- Location: Memorial Stadium • Lincoln, Nebraska

Wyoming and Nebraska met on the field for the first time ever, and coach Bible made sure the Cowboys understood what it was to face the Cornhusker machine. Wyoming was outclassed, outyarded and generally pushed around the field the entire game as the Cornhuskers easily rolled up 50 points in a dominating shutout which was the most points scored and largest margin of victory by Nebraska since a 58–0 blanking of Grinnell in 1927. The only disappointment of the game was Nebraska's two successful points after attempts in eight tries.

=== Minnesota ===
Nebraska at Minnesota

| Team | 1 | 2 | Total |
|---|---|---|---|
| Nebraska | | | 0 |
| • Minnesota | | | 20 |

- Date: October 3
- Location: Memorial Stadium • Minneapolis

Nebraska's fortunes were quickly and clearly reversed when the Golden Gophers welcomed Nebraska to Minneapolis by soundly defeating them 20–0. Nebraska tried to make it a game and held Minnesota to a single first half score, but their attempt to tie it up was rebuffed when the Gophers managed to turn the Cornhuskers away with no points from just three yards out. Nebraska's defensive stand finally broke open in the fourth quarter as Minnesota put in two more scores to secure the victory, setting the Cornhuskers back to 2–12–2 in the series. Minnesota went on to finish their season 8–0–0 and ranked #1 in the US by the Dickinson System.

=== Iowa ===
Iowa at Nebraska

| Team | 1 | 2 | 3 | 4 | Total |
|---|---|---|---|---|---|
| Iowa | 0 | 0 | 6 | 7 | 13 |
| • Nebraska | 0 | 0 | 7 | 7 | 14 |

- Date: October 13
- Location: Memorial Stadium • Lincoln, Nebraska
- Game attendance: 35,000

Iowa brought a squad loaded with experienced veterans to Lincoln, and was favored to win against Nebraska's relatively inexperienced squad that was still smarting from the 0–20 downing handed them by Minnesota the week prior. Both teams fought to a standstill for the first half, but in the third quarter the Cornhuskers managed to put the ball across the line to get points on the board. The Hawkeyes promptly answered, but their point after went wide. The teams traded touchdowns again in the fourth quarter, but the missed kick in the third quarter came back to haunt Iowa as time ran out before they could make up the missing point. Nebraska improved to 16–7–3 in the series.

=== Oklahoma ===
Nebraska at Oklahoma

| Team | 1 | 2 | 3 | 4 | Total |
|---|---|---|---|---|---|
| • Nebraska | 0 | 0 | 0 | 6 | 6 |
| Oklahoma | 0 | 0 | 0 | 0 | 0 |

- Date: October 20
- Location: Oklahoma Memorial Stadium • Norman, Oklahoma

Nebraska opened conference play against a stubborn Sooner team that intended to take advantage of the inexperienced Cornhusker roster. At one point in the first half, Oklahoma rolled up to Nebraska's 2-yard line with 1st and goal, yet the Cornhuskers stonewalled all four attempts and sent the Sooners back with nothing to show for their efforts. Nebraska's fortunes were much the same when they were repelled with 1st and goal at the Oklahoma 5-yard line later in the game. As the final five minutes were ticking away, the Cornhuskers managed to block a punt and took over at the Sooner 25, punching in the game's sole touchdown five plays later to snatch the win and advance to 10–2–2 against Oklahoma all time.

=== Iowa State ===
Iowa State at Nebraska

| Team | 1 | 2 | Total |
|---|---|---|---|
| Iowa State | | | 6 |
| • Nebraska | | | 7 |

- Date: October 27
- Location: Memorial Stadium • Lincoln, Nebraska
- Game attendance: 24,320

Iowa State fought a fierce and close game, picking up 13 first downs to Nebraska's 9, in a mostly defensive battle that ranged back and forth with few points produced and only a handful of big plays. In the end, once again it was Nebraska's kicking game that saved the day with a successful point after kick, much to the relief of the Cornhuskers who had suffered a 2 of 8 kicking record in the first game of the season. Iowa State went home in disappointment, by one point having suffered yet another defeat in the series in which they lagged far behind, at 4–24–1.

=== Pittsburgh ===
Pittsburgh at Nebraska

| Team | 1 | 2 | Total |
|---|---|---|---|
| • Pittsburgh | | | 25 |
| Nebraska | | | 6 |

- Date: November 10
- Location: Memorial Stadium • Lincoln, Nebraska

The inexperience of the Nebraska squad was exposed again when the reigning eastern champion Pittsburgh team arrived in Lincoln and successfully extended their winning streak over Nebraska. The game was never seriously in doubt as the Panthers moved the ball with relative ease, allowing the Cornhuskers just one touchdown near the end of the game to avoid a total shutout. The loss in Lincoln was the first home-field defeat since a 9–10 game was dropped to Kansas State at the end of the 1930 season. Nebraska fell to 1–5–3 in the Pitt series. Pittsburgh went on to finish their season 8–1–0 and ranked #2 in the US by the Dickinson System.

=== Kansas ===
Nebraska at Kansas

| Team | 1 | 2 | 3 | 4 | Total |
|---|---|---|---|---|---|
| • Nebraska | 0 | 0 | 0 | 3 | 3 |
| Kansas | 0 | 0 | 0 | 0 | 0 |

- Date: November 17
- Location: Memorial Stadium • Lawrence, Kansas

An extended period of rain leading up to the game resulted in slippery, muddy, sloppy conditions that prevented either team from consistent success, though the edge belonged to the Cornhuskers statistically. Nebraska rolled up 245 yards while Kansas managed only 44, but the Cornhuskers lost fumbles at the Kansas 5-yard line two times among other miscues that kept them off the board. The scoreless frustration was ended when Nebraska managed a field goal in the fourth quarter, which would be the only points of the game. This was Nebraska's 30th win in the series, with Kansas having collected only 9 wins and 2 tie games between them.

=== Missouri ===
Missouri at Nebraska

| Team | 1 | 2 | 3 | 4 | Total |
|---|---|---|---|---|---|
| Missouri | 0 | 0 | 6 | 0 | 6 |
| • Nebraska | 0 | 0 | 0 | 13 | 13 |

- Date: November 24
- Location: Memorial Stadium • Lincoln, Nebraska

Nebraska may have insulted the Missouri squad by initially starting the game with backups, in the style of Knute Rockne's Notre Dame teams of years past, and the second team in fact quickly drove down the field to what seemed an inevitable score when the Tigers finally woke up and stopped them 10 yards out. Coach Bible put the starters in beginning in the second quarter, but the teams went on to hold each other off the board until halftime. Missouri was poised to finally secure a win in the series with a third quarter score, and the Cornhusker squad looked like it might be downed in front of their own homecoming crowd as the final quarter got underway. At last, and inside of just two minutes, Nebraska punched in a couple of touchdowns to gain the edge. Missouri began to crumble at that point, allowing Nebraska two more carries across the goal line, however both were called back on penalties. The Missouri-Nebraska Bell would remain in Lincoln yet another year as Missouri dropped their seventh straight to Nebraska and fell to 6–19–3 in the series.

=== Kansas State ===
Kansas State at Nebraska

| Team | 1 | 2 | Total |
|---|---|---|---|
| • Kansas State | | | 19 |
| Nebraska | | | 7 |

- Date: November 29
- Location: Memorial Stadium • Lincoln, Nebraska

Nebraska, against many predictions due to the inexperienced team that began the season, faced only one more obstacle between them and another Big 6 championship. Kansas State, responsible for the only previous Big 6 title that was not won by the Cornhuskers by way of a Wildcat win in 1930, once again dashed Nebraska's intent to take home another league banner. The Cornhuskers managed to score first and entered the halftime break ahead 7–0, but it was all Kansas State for the rest of the day, although Nebraska took a small comfort in securing 21 first downs to the 13 obtained by the Wildcats, and remained comfortably in the series lead at 16–2–1.

== After the season ==
Despite the season's final record, 1934 was still regarded as a success, considering that the starting players were significantly inexperienced compared to most of their opponents, yet only lost three games on the season, with two of those losses handed over to the eventual #1 and #2 teams in the US. Coach Bible's career record dipped slightly with the three losses, to 37–11–6 (.741). For only the second time since the Big 6 formed, Nebraska failed to take the league championship, having to settle for 2nd place. The program's overall record now stood at 257–85–26, and the league record at 78–11–8 (.845).
