= 1934 Detroit Titans football team =

American college football season

1934 Detroit Titans football
- Conference: Independent
- Record: 5–3–1
- Head coach: Gus Dorais (10th season)
- Home stadium: University of Detroit Stadium

1934 Midwestern college football independents records
	Conf.			Overall
Team	W	L	T	W		L		T
Michigan State		–		8	–	1	–	0
Wayne		–		7	–	1	–	0
Western State Teachers (MI)		–		7	–	1	–	0
Michigan State Normal		–		5	–	2	–	0
Notre Dame		–		6	–	3	–	0
Central State (MI)		–		5	–	3	–	0
Detroit		–		5	–	3	–	1
DePaul		–		4	–	3	–	0
Saint Louis		–		3	–	3	–	2
Marquette		–		4	–	5	–	0
Michigan Tech		–		1	–	2	–	1
Haskell		–		3	–	6	–	1
Missouri Mines		–		2	–	6	–	0
Wittenberg		–		2	–	7	–	0

The 1934 Detroit Titans football team represented the University of Detroit in the 1934 college football season. Detroit outscored its opponents by a combined total of 112 to 59 and finished with a 5–3–1 record in its 10th year under head coach and College Football Hall of Fame inductee, Gus Dorais.

== Schedule ==
Date	Opponent	Site	Result	Attendance	Source
September 28	Central State (MI)	University of Detroit Stadium; Detroit, MI	W 38–0	11,000	
October 5	Western State Teachers (MI)	University of Detroit Stadium; Detroit, MI	W 25–7		
October 12	Washington & Jefferson	University of Detroit Stadium; Detroit, MI	W 12–0	13,000	
October 20	at Villanova	Villanova Stadium; Villanova, PA	T 0–0	8,000	
October 26	Duquesne	University of Detroit Stadium; Detroit, MI	L 6–20	15,000	
November 3	Oklahoma A&M	University of Detroit Stadium; Detroit, MI	L 6–19		
November 17	at Michigan State	College Field; East Lansing, MI	L 6–7	20,000	
November 24	at Marquette	Marquette Stadium; Milwaukee, WI	W 13–6	9,000	
December 1	Washington State	University of Detroit Stadium; Detroit, MI	W 6–0	5,000	
