= William Shakespeare (American football) =

American football player (1912–1974)

Profile
- Positions: Halfback, punter

Personal information
- Born: September 27, 1912; Staten Island, New York, U.S.
- Died: January 17, 1974 (aged 61); Cincinnati, Ohio, U.S.

Career information
- High school: Port Richmond (Staten Island)
- College: Notre Dame
- NFL draft: 1936: 1st round, 3rd overall pick

Career history
- Pittsburgh Pirates (1936)*
- * Offseason or practice squad member only

Awards and highlights
- First-team All-American (1935)
- College Football Hall of Fame

William Valentine Shakespeare (September 27, 1912 – January 17, 1974), often known as Bill Shakespeare, was an American football player. He played at the halfback position, and also handled punting, for the Notre Dame Fighting Irish football teams from 1933 to 1935. He gained his greatest acclaim for throwing the winning touchdown pass as time ran off the clock in Notre Dame's 1935 victory over Ohio State, a game that was voted the best game in the first 100 years of college football. Shakespeare was selected as a consensus first-team All-American in 1935 and was posthumously inducted into the College Football Hall of Fame in 1983. Sharing the same name as the "Bard of Avon", Shakespeare earned nicknames including "the Bard of Staten Island", "the Bard of South Bend", and "the Merchant of Menace".

== Early life ==
Shakespeare was born on Staten Island, New York. His father, Valentine Shakespeare, was a New York City firefighter and the captain of Fire Company 163. The family claimed to be direct descendants of the famed writer William Shakespeare. The younger Shakespeare became a star football player at Staten Island's Port Richmond High School. He showed particular talent as a punter and later told reporters that he had trained his pet Fox Terrier to retrieve his punts as he practiced his technique.

== Notre Dame ==
=== Bard of Staten Island ===
He enrolled at the University of Notre Dame in 1932, the year after the death of the school's legendary football coach Knute Rockne. He played for the Notre Dame Fighting Irish football teams in 1933, 1934, and 1935, and was selected as a consensus All-American in 1935.

Because of his shared name with William Shakespeare, "the Bard of Avon", he acquired nicknames "the Bard of Staten Island" and "the Merchant of Menace". Newspapers reported that, though he claimed to be a direct descendant of the Bard, Shakespeare had flunked his sophomore English class. In 1934, newspapers published a photograph of Shakespeare staring at a football in the manner of Hamlet examining Yorick's skull under the caption "To Be Or Not To Be – Football Player or English Wizard Is Perplexing Question Facing William Shakespeare, of Notre Dame."

=== 1933 and 1934 seasons ===
As a sophomore in 1933, Shakespeare was a substitute at the halfback position. He also showed promise as a punter with an average of 53.2 yards on five punts.

As a junior in 1934, Shakespeare became the starting left halfback in the Notre Dame's first year under new coach Elmer Layden. In an October 1934 win over Carnegie Tech, Shakespeare ran 56 yards for a touchdown on a sweep play around the right end. The Associated Press noted: "Superb blocking opened the route for Shakespeare, who put a little reverse English on his dash and then outfooted the field to score." On November 24, 1934, he helped lead the Irish to a 12–6 win over Army with a 67-yard touchdown pass to Dominic Vairo in front of a crowd of 81,000 at Yankee Stadium. The Associated Press wrote that "the Irish scored a touchdown on a sensational pass, Shakespeare to Captain Vairo, who took the ball on Army's 15 as he was surrounded by three cadets and broke away to spring across the goal line." And in the final week of the season, he threw a 51-yard touchdown pass to Francis "Mike" Layden in a 14–0 win over the University of Southern California. He led the 1934 Notre Dame team in several offensive categories, including passing (230 yards and two touchdowns), kickoff returns (60 yards on four returns), and punting (41 punts for 1,638 yards and a 40.0 yard average).

=== 1935 season ===
==== Early games ====
In the opening game of the 1935 season, Shakespeare threw a pass from the 50-yard to Wayne Millner, who caught the ball on the five-yard line and ran into the endzone for a touchdown as Notre Dame defeated Kansas 28–7. The following week, Shakespeare ran for a touchdown against Carnegie Tech at Pitt Stadium—the first touchdown scored by Notre Dame in Pittsburgh since 1931. Against Wisconsin on October 12, 1935, he caught a 20-yard touchdown pass from Vic Wojcihovski to help lead Notre Dame to a 13–0 win at Camp Randall Stadium. In the fourth week of the 1935 season, Notre Dame beat Pitt, 9–6, as Shakespeare scored Notre Dame's only touchdown. Shakespeare also booted an 86-yard punt (70 yards in the air) in the Pitt game, still the longest punt in Notre Dame football history. He also kicked a 75-yard punt against Navy in 1935 that ranks as the fifth-longest in school history.

==== "Game of the Century" ====
On November 2, 1935, Notre Dame faced the undefeated 1935 Ohio State Buckeyes team in front of a crowd of 81,000 at Ohio Stadium. Ohio State was favored in the game and led at half-time by a score of 13–0. The score remained the same at the start of the fourth quarter, but the Irish rallied in the fourth quarter for two touchdowns to narrow Ohio State's lead to 13–12. With less than a minute left in the game, Notre Dame's quarterback Andy Pilney ran for a 30-yard gain to the Ohio State 19-yard line. Pilney was injured on the play and had to be carried off the field on a stretcher. Shakespeare replaced Pilney and threw a pass into the arms of an Ohio State player who intercepted the ball but dropped it before securing possession. With the clock running out, the ball was snapped to fullback Jim McKenna, who handed it to Shakespeare on what appeared to be a reverse. Shakespeare threw a pass into the endzone, which was caught by Wayne Millner on his knees for an 18–13 win.

The 1935 Notre Dame-Ohio State match was regarded as one of the greatest comebacks in history of the sport. Red Barber, who broadcast the game on radio, later called it "the greatest college football game I ever called." In The New York Times, Allison Danzig opened his report on the game by writing, "One of the greatest last-ditch rallies in football history toppled the dreaded Scarlet Scourge of Ohio State from its lofty pinnacle today as 81,000 dumbfounded spectators saw Notre Dame score three touchdowns in less than fifteen minutes to gain an almost miraculous 18–13 victory in jammed Buckeye Stadium." Radio announcer Tom Manning added, "I always said Shakespeare had a pair of rosary beads and a bottle of holy water in his back pocket." The media picked up stories of the Catholic faithful praying for Notre Dame as they listened to the game on the radio. One nun told a reporter of overhearing a colleague in her convent "gamefully bargaining" and eventually "threatening" the Poor Souls and saints for another Notre Dame touchdown. The Chicago Tribune later noted the irony that it was a truly ecumenical group that combined for the famed "Hail Mary" pass: "Mazziotti, a Catholic, handed to Shakespeare, a Protestant on a fake reverse. Shakespeare passed to End Wayne Millner, a Jewish boy." In 1969, as part of the centennial of the first college football game, the Associated Press conducted a poll to select the "game of the century", and the 1935 Notre Dame-Ohio State game was chosen as the best game in the first 100 years of college football.

==== Later games ====
The week after the Ohio State game, Notre Dame faced Northwestern featuring All-American end Henry Wadsworth Longfellow. Before the game, the Associated Press carried a story profiling the two players: "Shakespeare and Longfellow will meet tomorrow —- not to trade verses, but to play all the football they know." Longfellow later recalled, "Shakespeare and I played against each other for three years. Each year, because of our names, we got a terrific buildup. It was a natural, I suppose. All through my college days I never heard the end of it. The writers went wilder each year." Longfellow got the better of Shakespeare in 1935, as he caught a touchdown pass to help Northwestern win the game, 14–7. Shakespeare attempted to lead the Irish to another come-from-behind victory, as he ran 48 yard to the Northwestern ten-yard line late in the game, but the Northwestern defense held. On the last play of the game, Shakespeare threw a "long, desperate pass", but it was intercepted as time ran out.

On November 16, 1935, Shakespeare led a Notre Dame comeback against Army, but the comeback fell short as the game ended in a 6–6 tie. The game was played in Yankee Stadium in front of a crowd of 80,000, and Army led 6–0 late in the game. With a minute to go, Shakespeare threw a 44-yard pass to Millner at the Army goal line. The ball fell from Millner's arms, but the referee called pass interference and Notre Dame scored on the next play from the two-yard line. Damon Runyon wrote of the finish: "It is the opening gun, so to speak, of the duel with William Valentine Shakespeare, who waits until the very last minute to put on a typical Shakespeare finish to a Notre Dame football tale."

Shakespeare concluded his football career with a come-from-behind victory over the USC Trojans On November 23, 1935. USC led 6–0 at halftime, but Notre Dame scored 20 points in the second half. The Associated Press credited Shakespeare for leading the comeback: "Heading the brilliant attack was the 'bard of Staten Island,' William Shakespeare who closed his collegiate career with one of his greatest games." Shakespeare started the rally by throwing a 38-yard touchdown pass to Wally Fromhart.

==== Post-season honors ====
Shakespeare finished the 1935 college football season as Notre Dame's leader in most offensive categories, including passing (19 completions on 66 attempts for 267 yards), rushing (374 yards and four touchdowns on 104 carries), punting (1,801 yards on 45 punts), kickoff returns (123 yards on five returns), and scoring (24 points). He was selected as a consensus first-team All-American and finished third in the voting, behind Jay Berwanger and Monk Meyer, for the first Heisman Trophy award.

== NFL draft ==
Shakespeare was drafted in the first round (third overall selection) of the 1936 NFL draft by the Pittsburgh Pirates (now Steelers). The 1936 draft was the first official NFL draft, and Shakespeare holds the distinction of being the third player ever selected in an NFL draft, the first Notre Dame player to be drafted in the first round, and the first first-round pick for the Pirates. Despite being drafted in the first round, professional football was not a high-paying proposition in the mid-1930s, and Shakespeare opted for a career in business rather than professional football.

Before turning to a career in business, Shakespeare did take time to appear with fellow All-Americans Jay Berwanger, Bobby Wilson, Monk Moscrip and Gomer Jones in the RKO Pictures feature film, The Big Game.

== World War II ==
In July 1943, Shakespeare entered the U.S. Army and went overseas with the Ground Forces Reinforcement Command of the 106th Division. He was commissioned as a captain and commanded a machine-gun platoon of the 424th Infantry Regiment, which played a prominent role in the Ardennes breakthrough, and served in Northern France and the Rhineland Campaign. Shakespeare was awarded four battle stars, the Combat Infantryman Badge, and the Bronze Star for gallantry during the Battle of the Bulge.

== Later life ==
Shakespeare joined the Cincinnati Rubber Company upon graduating from Notre Dame in 1936. With exception of the time he spent in military service during World War II, Shakespeare spent his entire career with the company. By 1959, he had become a vice president of the company, and he became the company's president in 1960. He lived in Kenwood, Ohio and remained president of Cincinnati Rubber until his death in 1974. He died in January 1974 at age 61 at Good Samaritan Hospital in Cincinnati. He was married with two sons.

== Awards ==
In 1983, Shakespeare was posthumously named to the College Football Hall of Fame and he has also been inducted into the Staten Island Sports Hall of Fame.
