= 1934 Kansas State Wildcats football team =

American college football season

1934 Kansas State Wildcats football

Big 6 champion
- Conference: Big Six Conference
- Record: 7–2–1 (5–0 Big 6)
- Head coach: Pappy Waldorf (1st season)
- Home stadium: Memorial Stadium

1934 Big Six Conference football standings
	Conf.					Overall
Team	W		L		T	W		L		T
Kansas State $	5	–	0	–	0	7	–	2	–	1
Nebraska	4	–	1	–	0	6	–	3	–	0
Oklahoma	2	–	2	–	1	3	–	4	–	2
Kansas	1	–	2	–	2	3	–	4	–	3
Iowa State	1	–	3	–	1	5	–	3	–	1
Missouri	0	–	5	–	0	0	–	8	–	1
$ – Conference champion

The 1934 Kansas State Wildcats football team represented Kansas State University in the 1934 college football season. The 1934 team went undefeated in the Big Six Conference, and won the conference championship. It was the first major conference championship in school history, and the first since the team won the Kansas Intercollegiate Athletic Association title in 1912. It would be another 69 years until the Wildcats would win their next conference title, the Big 12 championship in 2003.

The Kansas State team was led by future Hall-of-Fame coach Lynn "Pappy" Waldorf, who would depart from the school following his one championship season. At the conclusion of the season, tackle George Maddox was named a first-team All-American player by several organizations (including the All-America Board), becoming the third player in team history to be so honored. The Wildcats scored 149 points and gave up 89 points.

== Schedule ==
Date	Opponent	Site	Result	Attendance	Source
September 29	Fort Hays*	Memorial Stadium; Manhattan, KS	W 13–0		
October 6	at Manhattan*	Ebbets Field; Brooklyn, NY	T 13–13	7,500	
October 12	at Marquette*	Marquette Stadium; Milwaukee, WI	L 20–27	10,000	
October 20	Kansas^{†}	Memorial Stadium; Manhattan, KS (rivalry)	W 13–0	14,000	
October 27	at Tulsa*	Skelly Field; Tulsa, OK	L 0–21	12,000	
November 3	at Washburn*	Moore Bowl; Topeka, KS	W 14–6		
November 10	Missouri	Memorial Stadium; Manhattan, KS	W 29–0	7,000	
November 17	at Oklahoma	Oklahoma Memorial Stadium; Norman, OK	W 8–7	7,000	
November 24	Iowa State	Memorial Stadium; Manhattan, KS (rivalry)	W 20–0	8,000	
November 29	at Nebraska	Memorial Stadium; Lincoln, NE (rivalry)	W 19–7	22,000	
*Non-conference game; ^{†}Homecoming
