= Dominic Vairo =

American football player (1913–2002)

No. 35
- Position: End

Personal information
- Born: November 2, 1913; Calumet, Michigan, U.S.
- Died: July 31, 2002 (aged 88); Calumet, Michigan, U.S.
- Listed height: 6 ft 2 in (1.88 m)
- Listed weight: 203 lb (92 kg)

Career information
- High school: Calumet (MI)
- College: Notre Dame (1931–1934)

Career history
- Green Bay Packers (1935); Calumet All-Stars (1936); Chicago Gunners (1936–1937)

Career statistics
- Games played: 1
- Stats at Pro Football Reference

Dominic Martin Vairo (November 2, 1913 – July 31, 2002) was an American professional football end. He played college football for the Notre Dame Fighting Irish, serving as team captain as a senior in 1934. He then played professionally for the Green Bay Packers of the National Football League (NFL) in 1935, appearing in one game. After briefly playing for other non-NFL teams, he worked as a businessman and local official in his hometown of Calumet, Michigan.

== Early life ==
Vairo was born on November 2, 1913, in Calumet, Michigan. His father was an Italian immigrant and a tenant at the Italian Hall when the Italian Hall disaster occurred. Vairo attended Calumet High School where he was a letterman in three sports: football, basketball, and track and field. He also participated in tennis and hockey. He served as team captain in both football and basketball, winning All-Upper Peninsula honors in the former while helping the latter compile an undefeated record in the 1929–30 season. He graduated from Calumet in 1931 and enrolled at the University of Notre Dame later that year.

== College career ==
As a freshman at Notre Dame in 1931, Vairo "went out for every sport", according to the Associated Press, but received varsity letters in none of them. In football, he was a substitute on the freshman team. However, during the season, his jersey went missing and he was charged to pay for it. Unable to, he was forced to drop the sport. He also competed in almost every event in track and swimming in his attempt to receive a letter, but was unable to. He tried out for football again as a sophomore and made the varsity team as a walk-on. He then became a starter for the varsity at left end in the 1933 season. He was named team captain for the 1934 season and served as the starting right end. Playing under coach Elmer Layden, he helped Notre Dame compile a record of 6–3 in 1934 and was reportedly named an All-American. In a game against Army that year, he caught a game-winning touchdown. After the season, he was named the recipient of Notre Dame's Byron Kanaley Award, for "the senior letterman judged the most exemplary student and leader of men". He graduated in 1935 cum laude with a degree in business administration.

== Professional career ==
Vairo signed to play professional football with the Green Bay Packers of the National Football League (NFL) in August 1935. He appeared in one game as a backup before being released on October 1, 1935. He later played for the Calumet All-Stars before joining the Chicago Gunners in 1936, where he stayed through 1937. Vairo later recalled that when he joined the Packers, he was "amazed" by the skills of fellow end Don Hutson, noting that "I pretty much forgot about pro football after I saw him play."

== Later life and death ==
Following his football career, Vairo began working at Ford Motor Company and Cuneo Press in Chicago, Illinois. Following the death of his father, he moved back to Calumet in 1939, taking operation of his father's business. He was elected a county clerk in 1942 and soon after joined the United States Navy, serving in World War II in the South Pacific. He was discharged in 1946 and then returned to serving as a county clerk, a position he retained until 1952. He later worked for the Leveque Insurance Agency, which he operated until retiring in 1983.

Vairo was active in local sports, serving as an official and announcer for area high school games. He was a member of various civic groups and clubs, serving on the board of directors of the Calumet Public Hospital, the Miscowaubik Club and the Italian Mutual Insurance Company. He also was a member of the Elks Lodge, American Legion, and Veterans of Foreign Wars. Vairo was a board member of the St. Mary's Church and served on the board of directors for Calumet Electronics from 1967 to 2002. He was named the Outstanding Italian-American of the Year by the Order Sons of Italy in America in 1983.

Vairo married Dorothy Ahrbeck in 1936 and had a son and a daughter with her. He was inducted into the Upper Peninsula Sports Hall of Fame in 1976. He died in Calumet on July 31, 2002, at the age of 88. Vairo was posthumously inducted into the Calumet High School Athletic Hall of Fame in 2012.
