= 1934 Davidson Wildcats football team =

American college football season

1934 Davidson Wildcats football
- Conference: Independent
- Record: 4–4–1
- Head coach: Williams Newton (3rd season)
- Home stadium: Richardson Field

1934 Southern college football independents records
	Conf.			Overall
Team	W	L	T	W		L		T
Western Maryland		–		8	–	0	–	1
No. 7 Navy		–		8	–	1	–	0
Texas A&I		–		5	–	1	–	1
Troy State		–		7	–	2	–	0
Tulsa		–		5	–	2	–	1
George Washington		–		6	–	3	–	1
West Virginia		–		6	–	4	–	0
Oglethorpe		–		5	–	4	–	1
Delaware		–		4	–	3	–	1
Georgetown		–		4	–	3	–	1
Texas Mines		–		4	–	4	–	0
Catholic University		–		3	–	4	–	1
Jacksonville State		–		3	–	4	–	0
South Georgia Teachers		–		4	–	5	–	0
William & Mary Norfolk		–		2	–	4	–	2
Wake Forest		–		3	–	7	–	0
East Carolina		–		1	–	4	–	1
Oklahoma City		–		1	–	8	–	0
Dixie (TX)		–		0	–	7	–	0
Rankings from Associated Press

The 1934 Davidson Wildcats football team was an American football team that represented Davidson College as an independent during the 1934 college football season. In their third year under head coach Williams Newton, the team compiled a 4–4–1 record.

== Schedule ==
Date	Opponent	Site	Result	Attendance	Source
September 22	Elon	Richardson Field; Davidson, NC	W 33–6	3,500	
September 29	vs. NC State	World War Memorial Stadium; Greensboro, NC	L 0–7	12,000	
October 6	at Army	Michie Stadium; West Point, NY	L 0–41	9,000	
October 20	Duke	Richardson Field; Davidson, NC	L 0–20	10,000	
October 27	at The Citadel	Johnson Hagood Stadium; Charleston, SC	T 12–12		
November 3	Catawba	Richardson Field; Davidson, NC	W 18–0	2,000	
November 10	North Carolina^{†}	Richardson Field; Davidson, NC	L 2–12	10,000	
November 17	VMI	Richardson Field; Davidson, NC	W 27–13		
November 29	Wake Forest	Richardson Field; Davidson, NC	W 13–12	5,500	
^{†}Homecoming
