= 1934 Tampa Spartans football team =

American college football season

1934 Tampa Spartans football
- Conference: Independent
- Record: 8–4
- Head coach: Nash Higgins (2nd season)
- Home stadium: Plant Field

1934 Southern college football independents records
	Conf.			Overall
Team	W	L	T	W		L		T
Western Maryland		–		8	–	0	–	1
No. 7 Navy		–		8	–	1	–	0
Tennessee State		–		6	–	1	–	1
Texas A&I		–		5	–	1	–	1
Troy State		–		7	–	2	–	0
Tulsa		–		5	–	2	–	1
George Washington		–		6	–	3	–	1
Tampa		–		8	–	4	–	0
West Virginia		–		6	–	4	–	0
Oglethorpe		–		5	–	4	–	1
Delaware		–		4	–	3	–	1
Georgetown		–		4	–	3	–	1
Texas Mines		–		4	–	4	–	0
Catholic University		–		3	–	4	–	1
Jacksonville State		–		3	–	4	–	0
South Georgia Teachers		–		4	–	5	–	0
William & Mary Norfolk		–		2	–	4	–	2
Wake Forest		–		3	–	7	–	0
East Carolina		–		1	–	4	–	1
Oklahoma City		–		1	–	8	–	0
Dixie (TX)		–		0	–	7	–	0
Rankings from Associated Press

The 1934 Tampa Spartans football team represented the University of Tampa as an independent during the 1934 college football season. Led by Nash Higgins in his second season as head coach, the Spartans compiled an overall record of 8–4. The team played home games at Plant Field in Tampa, Florida.

== Schedule ==
Date	Opponent	Site	Result	Attendance	Source
October 12	at South Georgia Teachers	Statesboro, GA	L 13–21		
October 15	Newberry	Plant Field; Tampa, FL	W 36–6	5,000	
October 25	at Southern College (FL)	Adair Park; Lakeland, FL	W 13–2	4,000	
November 2	Bowdon College	Plant Field; Tampa, FL	W 54–0	3,000	
November 10	Birmingham–Southern	Plant Field; Tampa, FL	L 12–13		
November 17	at Stetson	Hulley Field; DeLand, FL	L 6–19		
November 23	Miami (FL)	Plant Field; Tampa, FL	W 7–6	6,000	
November 29	at Troy State	Pace Field; Troy, AL	W 6–2		
December 8	Rollins	Plant Field; Tampa, FL	L 2–6		
December 15	Club Atlético de Cuba	Plant Field; Tampa, FL	W 38–13	3,000	
December 25	Norfolk NAS	Plant Field; Tampa, FL	W 25–0		
December 30	at Club Atlético de Cuba	Polar Stadium; Havana, Cuba	W 25–0		
