= 1934 Tennessee State Tigers football team =

American college football season

1934 Tennessee State Tigers football
- Conference: Independent
- Record: 6–1–1
- Head coach: Walter S. Davis (2nd season)
- Home stadium: State College field

1934 Southern college football independents records
	Conf.			Overall
Team	W	L	T	W		L		T
Western Maryland		–		8	–	0	–	1
No. 7 Navy		–		8	–	1	–	0
Tennessee State		–		6	–	1	–	1
Texas A&I		–		5	–	1	–	1
Troy State		–		7	–	2	–	0
Tulsa		–		5	–	2	–	1
George Washington		–		6	–	3	–	1
West Virginia		–		6	–	4	–	0
Oglethorpe		–		5	–	4	–	1
Delaware		–		4	–	3	–	1
Georgetown		–		4	–	3	–	1
Texas Mines		–		4	–	4	–	0
Catholic University		–		3	–	4	–	1
Jacksonville State		–		3	–	4	–	0
South Georgia Teachers		–		4	–	5	–	0
William & Mary Norfolk		–		2	–	4	–	2
Wake Forest		–		3	–	7	–	0
East Carolina		–		1	–	4	–	1
Oklahoma City		–		1	–	8	–	0
Dixie (TX)		–		0	–	7	–	0
Rankings from Associated Press

The 1934 Tennessee State Tigers football team represented Tennessee Agricultural & Industrial State College—now known as Tennessee State University—as an independent during the 1934 college football season. Led by second-year head coach Walter S. Davis, the Tigers compiled a record of 6–1–1.

== Schedule ==
Date	Time	Opponent	Site	Result	Attendance	Source
October 12	3:45 p.m.	at Miles	Legion Field; Birmingham, AL	L 0–7		
October 20		Alabama A&M	Nashville, TN	W 25–0		
October 27	3:00 p.m.	at West Kentucky Industrial	Hook Park; Paducah, KY	T 0–0		
November 3		Mississippi Industrial	Nashville, TN	W 57–7	1,000	
November 10		at Lane	Jackson, TN	W 8–0		
November 16		at Louisville Municipal	Central High School stadium; Louisville, KY	W 12–6		
November 24	2:00 p.m.	Wilberforce	State College field; Nashville, TN	W 6–2	5,000–6,000	
November 29		Rust^{†}	State College field; Nashville, TN	W 91–0		
^{†}Homecoming; All times are in Central time
