= Tex Tilson =

Tex Tilson may refer to:

- Sumner D. Tilson
- Warren E. Tilson
