= 1928 South Dakota Coyotes football team =

American college football season

1928 South Dakota Coyotes football
- Conference: North Central Conference
- Record: 3–5 (1–3 NCC)
- Head coach: Vincent E. Montgomery (2nd season)
- Home stadium: Inman Field

1928 North Central Conference football standings
	Conf.					Overall
Team	W		L		T	W		L		T
North Dakota $	4	–	0	–	0	6	–	1	–	1
South Dakota State	3	–	1	–	0	9	–	1	–	0
Morningside	1	–	3	–	0	5	–	4	–	0
North Dakota Agricultural	1	–	3	–	0	3	–	4	–	1
South Dakota	1	–	3	–	0	3	–	5	–	0
$ – Conference champion

The 1928 South Dakota Coyotes football team was an American football team that represented the University of South Dakota in the North Central Conference (NCC) during the 1928 college football season. In its second season under head coach Vincent E. Montgomery, the team compiled a 3–5 record (1–3 against NCC opponents), finished in sixth place out of six teams in the NCC, and was outscored by a total of 77 to 71. The team played its home games at Inman Field in Vermillion, South Dakota.

The Coyotes' September 29 game against Yankton was broadcast on KUSD radio. A. H. Wittemore announced the play-by-play from a newly-constructed booth on top of the stadium at Inman Field.

== Schedule ==
Date	Opponent	Site	Result	Attendance	Source
September 27	Southern Normal*	Inman Field; Vermillion, SD	W 20–0		
September 29	Yankton*	Inman Field; Vermillion, SD	W 19–0		
October 6	at Duke	Durham, NC	L 6–25		
October 20	Morningside^{†}	Inman Field; Vermillion, SD	L 0–8	6,000	
October 27	at South Dakota State^{†}	Brookings, SD (rivalry, Hobo Day)	L 0–13	18,000	
November 3	at Iowa	Iowa Field; Iowa City, IA	L 0–19		
November 10	North Dakota	Inman Field; Vermillion, SD (rivalry)	L 0–6		
November 17	North Dakota Agricultural	Inman Field; Vermillion, SD	W 26–6		
*Non-conference game; ^{†}Homecoming
