= 1928 South Dakota State Jackrabbits football team =

American college football season

1928 South Dakota State Jackrabbits football
- Conference: North Central Conference
- Record: 9–1 (3–1 NCC)
- Head coach: Cy Kasper (1st season)

1928 North Central Conference football standings
	Conf.					Overall
Team	W		L		T	W		L		T
North Dakota $	4	–	0	–	0	6	–	1	–	1
South Dakota State	3	–	1	–	0	9	–	1	–	0
Morningside	1	–	3	–	0	5	–	4	–	0
North Dakota Agricultural	1	–	3	–	0	3	–	4	–	1
South Dakota	1	–	3	–	0	3	–	5	–	0
$ – Conference champion

The 1928 South Dakota State Jackrabbits football team was an American football team that represented South Dakota State University in the North Central Conference during the 1928 college football season. In its first season under head coach Cy Kasper, the team compiled a 9–1 record and outscored opponents by a total of 230 to 26.

== Schedule ==
Date	Time	Opponent	Site	Result	Attendance	Source
September 22		at Huron	Huron, SD	W 14–0		
September 29		Dakota Wesleyan	Brookings, SD	W 63–0		
October 13		at Columbus (SD)	Sioux Falls, SD	W 18–0		
October 20		at North Dakota	Memorial Stadium; Grand Forks, ND	L 0–6		
October 27		South Dakota	Brookings, SD (rivalry, Hobo Day)	W 13–0	18,000	
November 3		Creighton	Brookings, SD	W 18–7		
November 10		North Dakota Agricultural	Brookings, SD	W 27–6		
November 17		Minnesota B team	Memorial Stadium; Minneapolis, MN	W 31–0	3,000	
November 24		at Western Union	Le Mars, IA	W 33–0		
November 29	2:30 p.m.	at Morningside	Bass Field; Sioux City, IA	W 13–7		
All times are in Central time
