= Dixie College =

Dixie College may refer to:

- Dixie Technical College, St. George, Utah, U.S.
- Dixie University, Dallas, Texas, U.S. (1933–1935)
- Tennessee Tech, Cookeville, Tennessee, U.S., officially known as Dixie University from 1909 to 1915, but popularly called Dixie College
- Utah Tech University, the new name (July 2022) of Dixie State University (2013-2022), St. George, Utah, U.S., known as Dixie Academy (1913), Dixie Normal College (1916), Dixie Junior College (1923), Dixie College (1970), and Dixie State College (2000)
