= 1928 North Dakota Flickertails football team =

American college football season

1928 North Dakota Flickertails football

NCC champion
- Conference: North Central Conference
- Record: 6–1–1 (4–0 NCC)
- Head coach: Charles A. West (1st season)
- Captain: Willis Shepard
- Home stadium: Memorial Stadium

1928 North Central Conference football standings
	Conf.					Overall
Team	W		L		T	W		L		T
North Dakota $	4	–	0	–	0	6	–	1	–	1
South Dakota State	3	–	1	–	0	9	–	1	–	0
Morningside	1	–	3	–	0	5	–	4	–	0
North Dakota Agricultural	1	–	3	–	0	3	–	4	–	1
South Dakota	1	–	3	–	0	3	–	5	–	0
$ – Conference champion

The 1928 North Dakota Flickertails football team, also known as the Nodaks, was an American football team that represented the University of North Dakota in the North Central Conference (NCC) during the 1928 college football season. In its first year under head coach Charles A. West, the team compiled a 6–1–1 record (4–0 against NCC opponents), won the program's first conference championship, and outscored opponents by a total of 210 to 37.

Three North Dakota players were selected as first-team players on the 1928 All-North Central Conference football team: center Stuart MacMillan; end Willis Shepard; and tackle Eddie Showers. Shepard was also the team captain.

Back Cy Kahl became the first North Dakota athlete to play in the National Football League, signing with the Portsmouth Spartans in 1930. Two other members of the 1928 team went on to play in the Canadian Football League: Bill Mjogdalen and Curt Schave.

The 1928 team was inducted in 2003 into the University of North Dakota Athletic Hall of Fame.

== Schedule ==
Date	Opponent	Site	Result	Source
September 22	Manitoba*	Memorial Stadium; Grand Forks, ND	W 63–4	
September 29	Jamestown*	Memorial Stadium; Grand Forks, ND	W 80–0	
October 6	Carleton*	Memorial Stadium; Grand Forks, ND	T 0–0	
October 13	Morningside	Memorial Stadium; Grand Forks, ND	W 25–13	
October 20	South Dakota State^{†}	Memorial Stadium; Grand Forks, ND	W 6–0	
October 27	at North Dakota Agricultural	Dacotah Field; Fargo, ND (rivalry)	W 18–0	
November 10	at South Dakota	Inman Field; Vermillion, SD (rivalry)	W 6–0	
November 17	Mount St. Charles*	Memorial Stadium; Grand Forks, ND	L 12–20	
*Non-conference game; ^{†}Homecoming
