= 1934 VPI Gobblers football team =

American college football season

1934 VPI Gobblers football
- Conference: Southern Conference
- Record: 5–5 (3–3 SoCon)
- Head coach: Henry Redd (3rd season)
- Captains: Louis L. Fittro; George Maxie Smith
- Home stadium: Miles Stadium

1934 Southern Conference football standings
	Conf.					Overall
Team	W		L		T	W		L		T
Washington and Lee $	4	–	0	–	0	7	–	3	–	0
North Carolina	2	–	0	–	1	7	–	1	–	1
Duke	3	–	1	–	0	7	–	2	–	0
Maryland	3	–	1	–	0	7	–	3	–	0
Clemson	2	–	1	–	0	5	–	4	–	0
VPI	3	–	3	–	0	5	–	5	–	0
South Carolina	2	–	3	–	0	5	–	4	–	0
NC State	1	–	3	–	1	2	–	6	–	1
Virginia	1	–	4	–	0	3	–	6	–	0
VMI	0	–	5	–	0	1	–	8	–	0
$ – Conference champion

The 1934 VPI Gobblers football team represented Virginia Agricultural and Mechanical College and Polytechnic Institute in the 1934 college football season. The team was led by their head coach Henry Redd and finished with a record of five wins and five losses (5–5).

== Schedule ==
Date	Time	Opponent	Site	Result	Attendance	Source
September 22		Roanoke*	Miles Stadium; Blacksburg, VA	W 21–0		
September 29		at Temple*	Temple Stadium; Philadelphia, PA	L 0–34	12,000	
October 6		Florida*	Miles Stadium; Blacksburg, VA	L 13–20		
October 13		vs. William & Mary*	City Stadium; Richmond, VA	W 6–0	9,000	
October 20	2:30 p.m.	vs. Maryland	Bain Field; Norfolk, VA	L 9–14	> 4,500	
October 27	11:00 a.m.	at Washington and Lee	Wilson Field; Lexington, VA	L 7–13	8,000-10,000	
November 3	2:30 p.m.	at South Carolina	Columbia Municipal Stadium; Columbia, SC	L 0–20		
November 10	2:15 p.m.	vs. NC State	Washington Street Park; Portsmouth, VA	W 7–6	7,000	
November 17		Virginia^{†}	Miles Stadium; Blacksburg, VA (rivalry)	W 19–6	3,000	
November 29		vs. VMI	Maher Field; Roanoke, VA (rivalry)	W 13–0	10,000	
*Non-conference game; ^{†}Homecoming; All times are in Eastern time

== Before the season ==
The 1933 VPI Gobblers football team compiled a 4–3–3 record and were led by Henry Redd in his second season as head coach.

== Game summaries ==
=== Roanoke ===
Roanoke at VPI

Team	1	2	3	4	Total
Roanoke	0	0	0	0	0
• VPI	0	7	7	7	21

- Date: September 22, 1934
- Location: Miles Stadium
  Blacksburg, VA
- Game weather: "blistering heat"
- Referee: Parrish (VPI)

VPI's first game of the season was a victory over Roanoke at Miles Stadium.

The starting lineup for VPI was: Reynolds (left end), Dodge (left tackle), Copenhaver (left guard), Jones (center), English (right guard), Banks (right tackle), Negri (right end), Smith (quarterback), Ottaway (left halfback), Russell (right halfback), Dickerson (fullback). The substitutes were: Botnick, Cunningham, Dailey, Fittro, Ingles, Ochs, Rankin, Sodaro, Spruill, Stowe, Thomas and Wagley.

The starting lineup for Roanoke was: Ward Akers (left end), George Pitzer (left tackle), Gus Quisito (left guard), Weldon Plank (center), Earl Fisher (right guard), Harry Suttner (right tackle), J. "Buss" Irvin (right end), Harrison Weeks (quarterback), Gregory Wroniewicz (left halfback), Herman Smith (right halfback), Bud Miley (fullback). The substitutes were: Carey Brewbaker, Edward Gough and John Pitzer.

=== Temple ===
VPI at Temple

Team	1	2	3	4	Total
VPI	0	0	0	0	0
• Temple	7	0	21	6	34

- Date: September 29, 1934
- Location: Temple Stadium
  Philadelphia, PA
- Game attendance: 12,000
- Game weather: "drizzling rain"
- Referee: Wilmer G. Crowell

After their victory over Roanoke, VPI played Temple University at Temple Stadium in Philadelphia.

The starting lineup for VPI was: Thomas (left end), Banks (left tackle), English (left guard), Jones (center), Copenhaver (right guard), Dodge (right tackle), Negri (right end), Smith (quarterback), Ottaway (left halfback), Russell (right halfback), Dickerson (fullback).

The starting lineup for Temple was: Lloyd Wise (left end), James Russell (left tackle), John Boyd (left guard), Peter P. Stevens (center), Frank Schaefer (right guard), Zukas (right tackle), Joseph Zanin (right end), Glenn Frey (quarterback), John Stonik (left halfback), Daniel Testa (right halfback), David Smukler (fullback). The substitutes were: Hartman, Wilfred Longsderff and Horace Mowrey.

=== Florida ===
Florida at VPI

Team	1	2	3	4	Total
• Florida	0	7	0	13	20
VPI	0	0	0	13	13

- Date: October 6, 1934
- Location: Miles Stadium
  Blacksburg, VA

The starting lineup for VPI was: Thomas (left end), Banks (left tackle), English (left guard), Wagley (center), Ochs (right guard), Dodge (right tackle), Negri (right end), Smith (quarterback), Holsclaw (left halfback), Carpenter (right halfback), Dickerson (fullback).

The starting lineup for Florida was: Chuck Rogers (left end), Hal Starbuck (left tackle), Bill Turner (left guard), Alton Brown (center), Carlisle Hughes (right guard), Bill Stark (right tackle), Robert Rickett (right end), Wally Brown (quarterback), Billy Chase (left halfback), Jack Beckwith (right halfback), Charlie Stoltz (fullback).

=== William & Mary ===
William & Mary vs. VPI

Team	1	2	3	4	Total
W&M	0	0	0	0	0
• VPI	0	6	0	0	6

- Date: October 13, 1934
- Location: City Stadium
  Richmond, VA
- Game attendance: 9,000
- Referee: Richard Carrington (UVA)

The starting lineup for VPI was: Thomas (left end), Dodge (left tackle), English (left guard), Copenhaver (center), Ochs (right guard), Negri (right tackle), Fittro (right end), Smith (quarterback), Holsclaw (left halfback), Sodaro (right halfback), Dickerson (fullback). The substitutes were: Botnick, Cunningham, Huffman and Russell.

The starting lineup for William & Mary was: Albert Michaels (left end), Waddy Stewart (left tackle), Frank Livesay (left guard), Joseph Bridgers (center), Joseph Marino (right guard), Norman Murray (right tackle), Walter J. Zable (right end), Charles Shade (quarterback), Melville Bryant (left halfback), Arthur Woodward (right halfback), William Yerkes (fullback). The substitutes were: Marshall Brickell, Albert DeGutis, Preacher Franklyn, Hatke, Ned LeGrande, Reginald Pinch, Harry Spack and John Truehart.

=== Maryland ===
Maryland vs. VPI

Team	1	2	3	4	Total
• Maryland	7	0	0	7	14
VPI	7	0	2	0	9

- Date: October 20, 1934
- Location: Bain Field
  Norfolk, VA
- Game start: 2:30 p.m.
- Game attendance: >4,500
- Game weather: "perfect"
- Referee: Frank Lane

The starting lineup for VPI was: Fittro (left end), Huffman (left tackle), Ochs (left guard), Copenhaver (center), Botnick (right guard), Dodge (right tackle), Thomas (right end), Holsclaw (quarterback), Smith (left halfback), Sodaro (right halfback), Dickerson (fullback). The substitutes were: Daily, Negri, Ottaway, Reynolds, Russell and Stowe.

The starting lineup for Maryland was: Louis Ennis (left end), Ed Minion (left tackle), John Birkland (left guard), Bill Andorka (center), John Simpson (right guard), Carl Stalfort (right tackle), Victor G. Willis (right end), Norwood Sothoron (quarterback), Bill Guckeyson (left halfback), George Sachs (right halfback), Charles Yaeger (fullback). The substitutes were: Brooks Bradley, Bernie Buscher, Joseph Crecca, Edmond Daly, Charles F. Ellinger, Edward Fletcher, William Garrott, John Gormley, Harry Gretz, Coleman Headley, Charlie Keller, Stewart McCaw, Tom McLaughlin, Dick Nelson, Edward Quigley, Jack Stonebraker and Earl Widmyer.

=== Washington and Lee ===
VPI at Washington and Lee

Team	1	2	3	4	Total
VPI	0	0	7	0	7
• W&L	0	0	0	13	13

- Date: October 27, 1934
- Location: Wilson Field
  Lexington, VA
- Game start: 11:00 a.m.
- Game attendance: 8,000-10,000

The starting lineup for VPI was: Fittro (left end), Negri (left tackle), Copenhaver (left guard), Jones (center), Banks (right guard), Dodge (right tackle), Thomas (right end), Holsclaw (quarterback), Carpenter (left halfback), Smith (right halfback), Dickerson (fullback).

The starting lineup for Washington and Lee was: William Ellis (left end), William Dyer (left tackle), Porter Berry (left guard), George Glynn (center), Hugo Bonino (right guard), Howard Owings (right tackle), Charles Smith (right end), William Seaton (quarterback), Samuel Mattox (left halfback), Alfred Moore (right halfback), Jack Bailey (fullback). The substitutes were: Joseph Arnold and Edward Seitz.

=== South Carolina ===
VPI at South Carolina

Team	1	2	3	4	Total
VPI	0	0	0	0	0
• South Carolina	0	7	0	13	20

- Date: November 3, 1934
- Location: Columbia Municipal Stadium
  Columbia, SC
- Game start: 2:30 p.m.
- Referee: Bagley (W&L)

The starting lineup for VPI was: Fittro (left end), Banks (left tackle), Copenhaver (left guard), Jones (center), Botnick (right guard), Dodge (right tackle), Thomas (right end), Smith (quarterback), Carpenter (left halfback), Ottaway (right halfback), Dickerson (fullback). The substitutes were: Dailey, Howard, Ingles, Lakin, Negri, O'Neale, Ochs, Piland, Rankin, Reynolds, Robinette, Russell and Stowe.

The starting lineup for South Carolina was: Tom Craig (left end), Paul Gaffney (left tackle), Donald Tomlin (left guard), Roy Stroud (center), Dean Fowble (right guard), Freeman Huskey (right tackle), John Rowland (right end), Harold Mauney (quarterback), Clay "Bud" Alexander (left halfback), Bob Robbins (right halfback), Allie McDougall (fullback). The substitutes were: Brown, Fred Craft, Freeman, Johnston, William McCrady, Randolph Murdaugh, Paul Robelot, Earnest Stokes, Fritz Turner, Watson and Walker Yonce.

=== NC State ===
NC State vs. VPI

Team	1	2	3	4	Total
NC State	0	0	0	6	6
• VPI	7	0	0	0	7

- Date: November 10, 1934
- Location: Washington Street Park
  Portsmouth, VA
- Game start: 2:15 p.m.
- Game attendance: 7,000
- Referee: Everett Strupper

The starting lineup for VPI was: Thomas (left end), Banks (left tackle), Copenhaver (left guard), Jones (center), Botnick (right guard), Dodge (right tackle), Fittro (right end), Smith (quarterback), Russell (left halfback), Carpenter (right halfback), Dickerson (fullback). The substitutes were: Holsclaw, Ochs, Piland, Reynolds and Stump.

The starting lineup for NC State was: J. Kenneth Stephens (left end), C. T. Isaacs (left tackle), John Stanko (left guard), Steve Sabol (center), Barnes Worth (right guard), Cliff Daugherty (right tackle), Raymond Redding (right end), L. H. McCulley (quarterback), Jack Gattis (left halfback), Howard Bardes (right halfback), Ray Rex (fullback). The substitutes were: C. E. Bernhardt, Dom Cara, W. J. Dusty, A. J. Edwards, Vincent Farrar, N. H. Hayden, Herbert Kirschner, Roger Mass, Roscoe Roy and Joseph Ryneska.

=== Virginia ===
Virginia vs. VPI

Team	1	2	3	4	Total
UVA	0	6	0	0	6
• VPI	0	7	6	6	19

- Date: November 17, 1934
- Location: Miles Stadium
  Blacksburg, VA
- Game attendance: 3,000
- Referee: Frank Lane

VPI's 1934 homecoming game was a victory over rival Virginia.

The starting lineup for VPI was: Fittro (left end), Banks (left tackle), Copenhaver (left guard), Jones (center), Ochs (right guard), Dodge (right tackle), Reynolds (right end), Holsclaw (quarterback), Carpenter (left halfback), Smith (right halfback), Dickerson (fullback). The substitutes were: Botnick, Daily, Howard, Ingles, Ottaway, Piland, Russell, Shafer, Sodaro, Spruill and Stowe.

The starting lineup for Virginia was: Wier Tucker (left end), Edward Andrews (left tackle), William Zimmer (left guard), Horace Hallett (center), Peyton Hoge (right guard), Leonard Trell (right tackle), Cullen Wilkin (right end), Thomas Johnson (quarterback), Vincent Cardwell (left halfback), Griffith Dodson (right halfback), Spencer Berger (fullback). The substitutes were: Andrew Conner, Philip Fryberger, Randolph Garnett, Sanford Haskell, Kenneth Morton, Willard Quarles, Gordon Regan and George Seibels.

=== VMI ===
VMI vs. VPI

Team	1	2	3	4	Total
VMI	0	0	0	0	0
• VPI	0	7	6	0	13

- Date: November 29, 1934
- Location: Maher Field
  Roanoke, VA
- Game attendance: 10,000
- Game weather: "drizzling rain"
- Referee: Buck Cheves

The starting lineup for VPI was: Reynolds (left end), Banks (left tackle), Copenhaver (left guard), Jones (center), Ochs (right guard), Dodge (right tackle), Fittro (right end), Smith (quarterback), Carpenter (left halfback), Russell (right halfback), Dickerson (fullback). The substitutes were: Botnick, Daily, Holsclaw, Howard, Ingles, Ottaway, Piland, Rankin, Shafer, Sodaro and Spruill.

The starting lineup for VMI was: Charles Hancock (left end), Russ Coleman (left tackle), John Burgess (left guard), Jack Zimmerman (center), James Farley (right guard), Harry Hightower (right tackle), Morris Haas (right end), Bo McMillin (quarterback), Wayt Clark (left halfback), Tucker Watkins (right halfback), Dick Dodson (fullback). The substitutes were: Maxie Bair, John Childress, David Kane, Bill Oglesby, John Penn and Archie Witt.

== After the season ==
In December 1934, the VPI players chose Louis Fittro as captain of the 1935 VPI Gobblers football team.

== Players ==
=== Roster ===
VPI 1934 roster
Mac Banks; Junius Baydush; Benny Botnick; Jim Bragg; Buck Carpenter; Jim Copenhaver; Martin Cunningham; Kay Dailey; Herman "Foots" Dickerson; Ben Dodge; Edward Ralph "Red" English; Louis Fittro (Capt.); Everett W. Gee; Duncan Holsclaw; Harry Howard; Roy "Tris" Huffman; Bud Ingles; Dave Jones; Wilburt Kennedy; Walter Lakin	Gordon LeFebvre; Warren "Red" Negri; Malcolm O'Neale; Norman Ochs; Jim Ottaway; Oscar "Flinky" Piland; Frank Rankin; Buck Reynolds; Ralph Riner; Bill Ruby; Joe D. Russell; Alex Shafer; George Smith (Capt.); George Sodaro; Howard "Hank" Spruill; Durward Stowe; Bob Stump; Dave Thomas; Charles Wagley

=== Varsity letter winners ===
Twenty players received varsity letters for their participation on the 1934 VPI team.

Player	Hometown	Notes
F. MacRae "Mac" Banks	Beckley, West Virginia	
Benjamin Botnick	Elmira, New York	World War II veteran (Navy).
John Albert "Jack/Buck" Carpenter	Brooklyn, New York	Son of former VPI player Hunter Carpenter.
James Henry Copenhaver	Rural Retreat, Virginia	World War II veteran (Captain, Army).
Herman Edward "Foots" Dickerson	Reidsville, North Carolina	World War II veteran (Major, Army). First Virginia Tech player to be chosen in the NFL draft.
Benjamin Walter Dodge	Norfolk, Virginia	
Louis Leonard Fittro (Capt.)	Clarksburg, West Virginia	
William Duncan Holsclaw	Charleston, West Virginia	
Harry Worden Howard	East Orange, New Jersey	
Roy Edward "Tris" Huffman	Culpeper, Virginia	
David R. Jones	Cambria, Virginia	
John Norman Ochs	Cincinnati, Ohio	World War II veteran.
James Edward Ottaway	Sherrill, New York	World War II veteran (Lieutenant Commander, Navy).
Oscar Glazier "Flinky" Piland	Suffolk, Virginia	World War II veteran (Lieutenant Colonel, Army).
Lawrence Samuel "Buck" Reynolds	Cumberland, Maryland	
Joseph Decatur Russell	Suffolk, Virginia	
George Maxie Smith (Capt.)	Petersburg, Virginia	
George Edward Sodaro	Charleston, West Virginia	World War II veteran (Tec 4, Army). Awarded the Bronze Star Medal.
Howard Arnold "Hank" Spruill	Portsmouth, Virginia	
David T. Thomas	Hyattsville, Maryland	

== Coaching and training staff ==
- Head coach: Henry Redd
- Manager: B. D. Spangler
- Freshman coaches
  - Freshman head coach: Herbert McEver
  - Assistant freshman coach: Sumner D. Tilson
  - Assistant freshman coach: W. B. Porterfield
