= 1934 South Dakota State Jackrabbits football team =

American college football season

1934 South Dakota State Jackrabbits football
- Conference: North Central Conference
- Record: 6–4 (2–2 NCC)
- Head coach: Red Threlfall (1st season)
- Home stadium: State Field

1934 North Central Conference football standings
	Conf.					Overall
Team	W		L		T	W		L		T
North Dakota $	3	–	1	–	0	7	–	1	–	0
North Dakota Agricultural	2	–	1	–	1	5	–	3	–	2
Morningside	2	–	1	–	1	4	–	3	–	1
South Dakota State	2	–	2	–	0	6	–	4	–	0
South Dakota	0	–	4	–	0	2	–	7	–	0
$ – Conference champion

The 1934 South Dakota State Jackrabbits football team was an American football team that represented South Dakota State University in the North Central Conference (NCC) during the 1934 college football season. In its first season under head coach Red Threlfall, the team compiled a 6–4 record and outscored opponents by a total of 189 to 72.

Halfback Paul Miller led the team with 116 points scored.

== Schedule ==
Date	Time	Opponent	Site	Result	Attendance	Source
September 21		at Northern Normal*	Aberdeen, SD	W 52–0		
September 29		at Creighton*	Creighton Stadium; Omaha, NE	W 14–0		
October 6		at Morningside	Stock Yards Park; Sioux City, IA	L 7–13		
October 13		at Wisconsin*	Camp Randall Stadium; Madison, WI	L 7–28	12,000	
October 20		North Dakota	Memorial Stadium; Grand Forks, ND	T 0–0		
October 27		South Dakota^{†}	State Field; Brookings, SD (rivalry, Hobo Day)	W 19–0		
November 3		Dakota Wesleyan*	State Field; Brookings, SD	W 38–0		
November 10		North Dakota Agricultural	State Field; Brookings, SD (rivalry)	W 38–0		
November 17		vs. St. Olaf*	East Side Athletic Field; Sioux Falls, SD (Atokad Day)	W 14–6	3,000	
November 23	2:30 p.m.	at Wichita	Wichita University Stadium; Wichita, KS	L 0–19		
*Non-conference game; ^{†}Homecoming; All times are in Central time
