= 1928 Morningside Maroons football team =

American college football season

1928 Morningside Maroons football
- Conference: Iowa Conference, North Central Conference
- Record: 5–4 (2–0 Iowa, 1–3 NCC)
- Head coach: Jason M. Saunderson (17th season)
- Home stadium: Bass Field

1928 Iowa Conference football standings
	Conf.					Overall
Team	W		L		T	W		L		T
Iowa State Teachers $	4	–	0	–	2	5	–	1	–	3
Morningside	2	–	0	–	0	5	–	4	–	0
Luther	5	–	2	–	0	6	–	2	–	0
Penn (IA)	4	–	2	–	0	4	–	4	–	0
Des Moines	3	–	2	–	0	4	–	4	–	1
Iowa Wesleyan	3	–	2	–	0	5	–	3	–	0
Buena Vista	3	–	2	–	0	5	–	3	–	1
Simpson (IA)	3	–	2	–	1	4	–	4	–	1
St. Ambrose	2	–	2	–	1	2	–	4	–	2
Parsons	2	–	2	–	2	3	–	3	–	3
Western Union	1	–	2	–	0	4	–	5	–	0
Upper Iowa	1	–	3	–	1	1	–	3	–	1
Columbia (IA)	0	–	4	–	1	2	–	5	–	1
Central (IA)	0	–	8	–	0	0	–	8	–	0
$ – Conference champion

1928 North Central Conference football standings
	Conf.					Overall
Team	W		L		T	W		L		T
North Dakota $	4	–	0	–	0	6	–	1	–	1
South Dakota State	3	–	1	–	0	9	–	1	–	0
Morningside	1	–	3	–	0	5	–	4	–	0
North Dakota Agricultural	1	–	3	–	0	3	–	4	–	1
South Dakota	1	–	3	–	0	3	–	5	–	0
$ – Conference champion

The 1928 Morningside Maroons football team was an American football that represented Morningside College as a member of the during the Iowa Conference and North Central Conference (NCC) during the 1928 college football season. Led by 17th-year head coach Jason M. Saunderson, the Maroons compiled an overall record of 5–4 with a mark of 2–0 in Iowa Conference play, placing second, and 1–3 against NCC opponents, finishing in a three-way tie for third.

== Schedule ==
Date	Time	Opponent	Site	Result	Attendance	Source
September 29		Augustana (SD)*	Bass Field; Sioux City, IA	W 26–6		
October 6		Dakota Wesleyan*	Sioux City, IA	W 26–0		
October 13		at North Dakota	Memorial Stadium; Grand Forks, ND	L 13–25		
October 20		at South Dakota	Inman Field; Vermillion, SD	W 8–0	6,000	
October 27		Western Union	Sioux City, IA	W 6–0		
November 3	2:30 p.m.	North Dakota Agricultural^{†}	Bass Field; Sioux City, IA	L 0–12		
November 10		at Nebraska Wesleyan*	Lincoln, NE	L 0–13		
November 17		at Des Moines	Des Moines, IA	W 6–0		
November 29	2:30 p.m.	South Dakota State	Bass Field; Sioux City, IA	L 7–13		
*Non-conference game; ^{†}Homecoming; All times are in Central time
