= 1934 Washington and Lee Generals football team =

American college football season

1934 Washington and Lee Generals football

SoCon champion
- Conference: Southern Conference
- Record: 7–3 (4–0 SoCon)
- Head coach: Warren E. Tilson (2nd season)
- Home stadium: Wilson Field

1934 Southern Conference football standings
| | Conf. | | | | | Overall |
| Team | W | | L | | T | W | | L | | T |
|---|---|---|---|---|---|---|---|---|---|---|
| Washington and Lee $ | 4 | – | 0 | – | 0 | 7 | – | 3 | – | 0 |
| North Carolina | 2 | – | 0 | – | 1 | 7 | – | 1 | – | 1 |
| Duke | 3 | – | 1 | – | 0 | 7 | – | 2 | – | 0 |
| Maryland | 3 | – | 1 | – | 0 | 7 | – | 3 | – | 0 |
| Clemson | 2 | – | 1 | – | 0 | 5 | – | 4 | – | 0 |
| VPI | 3 | – | 3 | – | 0 | 5 | – | 5 | – | 0 |
| South Carolina | 2 | – | 3 | – | 0 | 5 | – | 4 | – | 0 |
| NC State | 1 | – | 3 | – | 1 | 2 | – | 6 | – | 1 |
| Virginia | 1 | – | 4 | – | 0 | 3 | – | 6 | – | 0 |
| VMI | 0 | – | 5 | – | 0 | 1 | – | 8 | – | 0 |
$ – Conference champion

The 1934 Washington and Lee Generals football team represented Washington and Lee University as a member of the Southern Conference (SoCon) during the 1934 college football season. Led by second-year head coach Warren E. Tilson, the General compiled an overall record of 7–3 with a record of 4–0, winning the SoCon title.

== Schedule ==
| Date | Opponent | Site | Result | Attendance | Source |
|---|---|---|---|---|---|
| September 22 | Wofford* | Wilson Field; Lexington, VA | W 19–0 | | |
| September 29 | at Kentucky* | McLean Stadium; Lexington, KY | W 7–0 | 6,000 | |
| October 6 | Maryland | Wilson Field; Lexington, VA | W 7–0 | | |
| October 13 | vs. West Virginia* | Laidley Field; Charleston, WV | L 0–12 | | |
| October 20 | at Princeton* | Palmer Stadium; Princeton, NJ | L 12–14 | 25,000 | |
| October 27 | VPI | Wilson Field; Lexington, VA | W 13–7 | 8,000 | |
| November 3 | at Navy* | Thompson Stadium; Annapolis, MD | L 0–26 | 22,000 | |
| November 10 | at Virginia | Scott Stadium; Charlottesville, VA | W 20–0 | 7,000 | |
| November 17 | at William & Mary* | Cary Field; Williamsburg, VA | W 7–0 | 4,000 | |
| November 29 | at South Carolina | Carolina Municipal Stadium; Columbia, SC | W 14–7 | 9,000 | |
*Non-conference game
