= 1934 South Carolina Gamecocks football team =

American college football season

1934 South Carolina Gamecocks football
- Conference: Southern Conference
- Record: 5–4 (2–3 SoCon)
- Head coach: Billy Laval (7th season)
- Captain: Tom Craig
- Home stadium: Carolina Municipal Stadium

1934 Southern Conference football standings
| | Conf. | | | | | Overall |
| Team | W | | L | | T | W | | L | | T |
|---|---|---|---|---|---|---|---|---|---|---|
| Washington and Lee $ | 4 | – | 0 | – | 0 | 7 | – | 3 | – | 0 |
| North Carolina | 2 | – | 0 | – | 1 | 7 | – | 1 | – | 1 |
| Duke | 3 | – | 1 | – | 0 | 7 | – | 2 | – | 0 |
| Maryland | 3 | – | 1 | – | 0 | 7 | – | 3 | – | 0 |
| Clemson | 2 | – | 1 | – | 0 | 5 | – | 4 | – | 0 |
| VPI | 3 | – | 3 | – | 0 | 5 | – | 5 | – | 0 |
| South Carolina | 2 | – | 3 | – | 0 | 5 | – | 4 | – | 0 |
| NC State | 1 | – | 3 | – | 1 | 2 | – | 6 | – | 1 |
| Virginia | 1 | – | 4 | – | 0 | 3 | – | 6 | – | 0 |
| VMI | 0 | – | 5 | – | 0 | 1 | – | 8 | – | 0 |
$ – Conference champion

The 1934 South Carolina Gamecocks football team was an American football team that represented the University of South Carolina as a member of the Southern Conference (SoCon) during the 1934 college football season. In their seventh season under head coach Billy Laval, South Carolina compiled an overall record of 5–4 with a mark of 232 in conference play, placing seventh in the SoCon. On September 29, 1934, South Carolina defeated Erskine 20–0 in the first ever game in Carolina Municipal Stadium.

== Schedule ==
| Date | Opponent | Site | Result | Attendance | Source |
|---|---|---|---|---|---|
| September 29 | Erskine* | Melton Field; Columbia, SC | W 20–0 | 4,000 | |
| October 6 | VMI^{†} | Carolina Municipal Stadium; Columbia, SC | W 22–6 | 10,000 | |
| October 13 | at NC State | Riddick Stadium; Raleigh, NC | L 0–6 | 7,000 | |
| October 18 | vs. The Citadel* | County Fairgrounds; Orangeburg, SC | W 20–6 | 7,000 | |
| October 25 | Clemson | Carolina Municipal Stadium; Columbia, SC (rivalry) | L 0–19 | 17,500 | |
| November 3 | VPI | Carolina Municipal Stadium; Columbia, SC | W 22–6 | | |
| November 10 | at Villanova* | Villanova Stadium; Villanova, PA | L 0–20 | 6,000 | |
| November 17 | at Furman* | Manly Field; Greenville, SC | W 2–0 | 8,000 | |
| November 29 | Washington & Lee | Carolina Municipal Stadium; Columbia, SC | L 7–14 | 9,000 | |
*Non-conference game; ^{†}Homecoming
