= 1934 Maryland Terrapins football team =

American college football season

1934 Maryland Terrapins football
- Conference: Southern Conference
- Record: 7–3 (3–1 SoCon)
- Head coach: Curley Byrd (24th season)
- Home stadium: Byrd Stadium (original)

1934 Southern Conference football standings
	Conf.					Overall
Team	W		L		T	W		L		T
Washington and Lee $	4	–	0	–	0	7	–	3	–	0
North Carolina	2	–	0	–	1	7	–	1	–	1
Duke	3	–	1	–	0	7	–	2	–	0
Maryland	3	–	1	–	0	7	–	3	–	0
Clemson	2	–	1	–	0	5	–	4	–	0
VPI	3	–	3	–	0	5	–	5	–	0
South Carolina	2	–	3	–	0	5	–	4	–	0
NC State	1	–	3	–	1	2	–	6	–	1
Virginia	1	–	4	–	0	3	–	6	–	0
VMI	0	–	5	–	0	1	–	8	–	0
$ – Conference champion

The 1934 Maryland Terrapins football team was an American football team that represented the University of Maryland in the Southern Conference during the 1934 college football season. In their 24th and final season under head coach Curley Byrd, the Terrapins compiled a 7–3 record (3–1 in conference), finished in a tie for third place in the Southern Conference, and outscored their opponents by a total of 143 to 39. Coach Byrd went on to serve as the president of the University of Maryland from 1936 to 1954.

== Schedule ==
Date	Opponent	Site	Result	Attendance	Source
September 29	St. John's (MD)*	Byrd Stadium; College Park, MD	W 13–0		
October 6	at Washington and Lee	Wilson Field; Lexington, VA	L 0–7		
October 13	at Navy*	Thompson Stadium; Annapolis, MD (rivalry)	L 13–16	22,004	
October 20	vs. VPI	Norfolk, VA	W 14–9	> 4,500	
October 27	vs. Florida*	Baltimore Stadium; Baltimore, MD	W 21–0	8,000	
November 3	Virginia	Byrd Stadium; College Park, MD (rivalry)	W 20–0	6,000	
November 12	VMI	Baltimore Stadium; Baltimore, MD	W 23–0	8,000	
November 17	at Indiana*	Memorial Stadium; Bloomington, IN	L 14–17	6,000	
November 24	Georgetown*	Byrd Stadium; College Park, MD	W 6–0		
November 29	at Johns Hopkins*	Baltimore Stadium; Baltimore, MD	W 19–0	2,000	
*Non-conference game
