= 1934 Clemson Tigers football team =

American college football season

1934 Clemson Tigers football
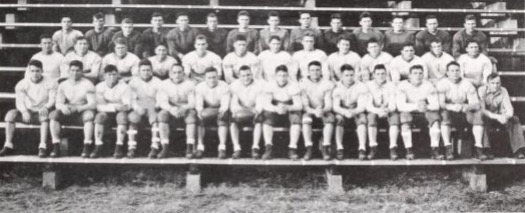
- Conference: Southern Conference
- Record: 5–4 (2–1 SoCon)
- Head coach: Jess Neely (4th season)
- Captain: Henry Woodward
- Home stadium: Riggs Field

1934 Southern Conference football standings
	Conf.					Overall
Team	W		L		T	W		L		T
Washington and Lee $	4	–	0	–	0	7	–	3	–	0
North Carolina	2	–	0	–	1	7	–	1	–	1
Duke	3	–	1	–	0	7	–	2	–	0
Maryland	3	–	1	–	0	7	–	3	–	0
Clemson	2	–	1	–	0	5	–	4	–	0
VPI	3	–	3	–	0	5	–	5	–	0
South Carolina	2	–	3	–	0	5	–	4	–	0
NC State	1	–	3	–	1	2	–	6	–	1
Virginia	1	–	4	–	0	3	–	6	–	0
VMI	0	–	5	–	0	1	–	8	–	0
$ – Conference champion

The 1934 Clemson Tigers football team was an American football team that represented Clemson College in the Southern Conference during the 1934 college football season. In their fourth season under head coach Jess Neely, the Tigers compiled a 5–4 record (2–2 against conference opponents), finished fifth in the conference, and outscored opponents by a total of 89 to 85.

Henry Woodward was the team captain. Five Clemson players were selected as first-team players on the 1934 All-Southern Conference football team: end Stanley Fellers; tackles Tom Brown and Manuel Black; guard Henry Shore; and back Randy Hinson.

== Schedule ==
Date	Opponent	Site	Result	Attendance	Source
September 22	Presbyterian*	Riggs Field; Clemson, SC	W 6–0	4,000	
September 29	at Georgia Tech*	Grant Field; Atlanta, GA (rivalry)	L 7–12		
October 6	at Duke	Duke Stadium; Durham, NC	L 6–20	7,000	
October 13	at Kentucky*	McLean Stadium; Lexington, KY	L 0–7		
October 25	at South Carolina	Municipal Stadium; Columbia, SC (rivalry)	W 19–0	17,500	
November 3	at NC State	Riddick Stadium; Raleigh, NC (rivalry)	W 12–6	7,000	
November 10	at Alabama*	Denny Stadium; Tuscaloosa, AL (rivalry)	L 0–40	8,000	
November 17	vs. Mercer*	Municipal Stadium; Savannah, GA	W 32–0		
November 29	Furman*	Riggs Field; Clemson, SC	W 7–0	10,500	
*Non-conference game
