= 1934 Virginia Cavaliers football team =

American college football season

1934 Virginia Cavaliers football
- Conference: Southern Conference
- Record: 3–6 (1–4 SoCon)
- Head coach: Gus Tebell (1st season)
- Captain: Thomas Johnson
- Home stadium: Scott Stadium

1934 Southern Conference football standings
	Conf.					Overall
Team	W		L		T	W		L		T
Washington and Lee $	4	–	0	–	0	7	–	3	–	0
North Carolina	2	–	0	–	1	7	–	1	–	1
Duke	3	–	1	–	0	7	–	2	–	0
Maryland	3	–	1	–	0	7	–	3	–	0
Clemson	2	–	1	–	0	5	–	4	–	0
VPI	3	–	3	–	0	5	–	5	–	0
South Carolina	2	–	3	–	0	5	–	4	–	0
NC State	1	–	3	–	1	2	–	6	–	1
Virginia	1	–	4	–	0	3	–	6	–	0
VMI	0	–	5	–	0	1	–	8	–	0
$ – Conference champion

The 1934 Virginia Cavaliers football team represented the University of Virginia during the 1934 college football season. The Cavaliers were led by first-year head coach Gus Tebell and played their home games at Scott Stadium in Charlottesville, Virginia. They competed as members of the Southern Conference, finishing with a conference record of 1–4 and a 3–6 record overall.

== Schedule ==
Date	Opponent	Site	Result	Attendance	Source
September 29	Hampden–Sydney*	Scott Stadium; Charlottesville, VA	W 8–0	1,000	
October 6	vs. Navy*	Griffith Stadium; Washington, DC	L 6–21	12,000	
October 13	St. John's (MD)*	Scott Stadium; Charlottesville, VA	W 27–6	5,000	
October 20	at Dartmouth*	Memorial Field; Hanover, NH	L 0–27		
October 27	at VMI	Alumni Field; Lexington, VA	W 17–13	6,000	
November 3	at Maryland	Byrd Stadium; College Park, MD (rivalry)	L 0–20	6,000	
November 10	Washington and Lee^{†}	Scott Stadium; Charlottesville, VA	L 0–20	7,000	
November 17	at VPI	Miles Stadium; Blacksburg, VA (rivalry)	L 6–19	3,000	
November 24	North Carolina	Scott Stadium; Charlottesville, VA (rivalry)	L 6–25	7,000	
*Non-conference game; ^{†}Homecoming
