= Jason M. Saunderson =

American football, basketball, and baseball coach

Biographical details
- Born: February 22, 1886; Rockville, Ontario, Canada
- Died: February 17, 1950 (aged 63); Sioux City, Iowa, U.S.

Coaching career (HC unless noted)

Football
- 1908–1910: South Dakota State
- 1912–1941: Morningside

Basketball
- 1907–1910: South Dakota State

Baseball
- 1909–1911: South Dakota State

Administrative career (AD unless noted)
- 1908–1910: South Dakota State

Head coaching record
- Overall: 124–105–14 (football); 11–7 (basketball); 16–6 (baseball)

Accomplishments and honors

Championships
- Football; 1 NCC (1923)

Jason McCollough "Saundy" Saunderson (February 22, 1886 – February 17, 1950) was an American football, basketball and baseball coach. He was the head football coach at South Dakota State College of Agriculture and Mechanic Arts — now known as South Dakota State University — from 1908 to 1910 and at Morningside College from 1912 to 1941, compiling a career college football coaching record of 124–105–14. He was also the head basketball coach at South Dakota State from 1907 to 1910, tallying a mark of 11–7, and the college's head baseball coach from 1909 to 1911, amassing a record of 16–6.

== Coaching career ==
Saunderson was the head football coach at Morningside College in Sioux City, Iowa. He held that position for 30 seasons, from 1912 until 1941. His coaching record at Morningside was 116–97–11.

== Head coaching record ==
=== Football ===
Year	Team	Overall	Conference	Standing	Bowl/playoffs
South Dakota State (Independent) (1908–1910)
1908	South Dakota State	3–3–1			
1909	South Dakota State	1–3			
1910	South Dakota State	4–2–2			
South Dakota State:		8–8–3			
Morningside Maroons (Independent) (1912–1921)
1912	Morningside	8–1–1			
1913	Morningside	5–2			
1914	Morningside	4–3			
1915	Morningside	3–3			
1916	Morningside	5–1–1			
1917	Morningside	5–1			
1918	Morningside	2–0			
1919	Morningside	5–2			
1920	Morningside	6–2			
1921	Morningside	6–2			
Morningside Maroons (North Central Conference) (1922–1941)
1922	Morningside	1–4–2	0–2–2	T–6th	
1923	Morningside	5–2	3–1	1st	
1924	Morningside	2–5	1–4	T–7th	
1925	Morningside	3–5	2–4	6th	
1926	Morningside	6–2	2–1	3rd	
1927	Morningside	3–5	1–3	T–5th	
1928	Morningside	5–4	1–3	T–3rd	
1929	Morningside	4–4	1–3	4th	
1930	Morningside	7–2	2–2	3rd	
1931	Morningside	2–6	1–3	T–4th	
1932	Morningside	2–6	0–4	5th	
1933	Morningside	4–4	1–3	T–4th	
1934	Morningside	4–3–1	2–1–1	T–2nd	
1935	Morningside	0–6–1	0–5–1	7th	
1936	Morningside	3–4	2–3	T–4th	
1937	Morningside	4–2–2	2–2–1	T–3rd	
1938	Morningside	4–3–1	1–3–1	T–5th	
1939	Morningside	2–6	1–5	5th	
1940	Morningside	3–2–2	2–2–1	4th	
1941	Morningside	3–5	1–4	6th	
Morningside:		116–97–11	26–58–7		
Total:		124–105–14			
National championship Conference title Conference division title or championship game berth
