= 1934 North Dakota Fighting Sioux football team =

American college football season

1934 North Dakota Fighting Sioux football

NCC champion
- Conference: North Central Conference
- Record: 7–1 (3–1 NCC)
- Head coach: Charles A. West (7th season)
- Home stadium: Memorial Stadium

1934 North Central Conference football standings
	Conf.					Overall
Team	W		L		T	W		L		T
North Dakota $	3	–	1	–	0	7	–	1	–	0
North Dakota Agricultural	2	–	1	–	1	5	–	3	–	2
Morningside	2	–	1	–	1	4	–	3	–	1
South Dakota State	2	–	2	–	0	6	–	4	–	0
South Dakota	0	–	4	–	0	2	–	7	–	0
$ – Conference champion

The 1934 North Dakota Fighting Sioux football team, also known as the Nodaks, was an American football team that represented the University of North Dakota in the North Central Conference (NCC) during the 1934 college football season. In its seventh year under head coach Charles A. West, the team compiled a 7–1 record (3–1 against NCC opponents), won the conference championship, and outscored opponents by a total of 88 to 10.

== Schedule ==
Date	Opponent	Site	Result	Source
September 21	Winnipeg Rugby Club*	Memorial Stadium; Grand Forks, ND	W 13–3	
September 28	Omaha*	Memorial Stadium; Grand Forks, ND	W 14–0	
October 6	at South Dakota	Vermillion, SD	W 21–0	
October 12	Morningside	Memorial Stadium; Grand Forks, ND	W 25–0	
October 23	South Dakota State	Memorial Stadium; Grand Forks, ND	W 6–0	
October 27	at North Dakota Agricultural	Dacotah Field; Fargo, ND	L 0–7	
November 18	at St. Thomas (PA)*	Scranton, PA	W 2–0	
November 23	at George Washington*	Washington, DC	W 7–0	
*Non-conference game
