= Golden Cyclones =

1930s American female athletic group

The Golden Cyclones were a 1930s group of women athletes who played Amateur Athletic Union (AAU) softball, basketball and track-and-field. Based in Dallas, Texas they were sponsored by the Employers Casualty Insurance Company (ECC) and coached by "Colonel" Melvin J. McCombs, manager of the ECC athletic program in Dallas.

Babe Zaharias was their star team member from 1930 to 1932, leading the Golden Cyclone Basketball team to the AAU women's basketball championship|AAU Women's Basketball Championship in 1931.

The Golden Cyclones were one of the dominant AAU teams of the era. In addition to the National Championship in 1931, they finished as the national runner-up in 1929, 1932 and 1933, while finishing fourth in 1930. They held the offensive record for scoring the most points ever in a National Tournament game (97) as well as the defensive record for the fewest points ever allowed (4).

In 1934, the Golden Cyclones were enrolled en masse into Dallas's new college, Dixie University, to become the college's women's basketball team known as the Dixie Rebels. Dixie instantly had a national championship-contending team in time for the 1934 national tournament. After winning its early games, the Rebels were trounced by the two-time defending champion Oklahoma City Cardinals in the quarter-finals. It appears that the Cyclones/Rebels never played another game.
