= 1934 Richmond Spiders football team =

American college football season

1934 Richmond Spiders football

Virginia Conference co-champion
- Conference: Virginia Conference
- Record: 8–1 (2–1 Virginia)
- Head coach: Glenn Thistlethwaite (1st season)
- Captain: W. S. "Smitty" Morris
- Home stadium: City Stadium

1934 Virginia Conference football standings
	Conf.					Overall
Team	W		L		T	W		L		T
Richmond +	2	–	1	–	0	8	–	1	–	0
William & Mary +	2	–	1	–	0	2	–	6	–	0
Emory and Henry	1	–	2	–	0	8	–	2	–	0
Roanoke	1	–	2	–	0	5	–	5	–	0
+ – Conference co-champions

The 1934 Richmond Spiders football team was an American football team that represented the University of Richmond as a member of the Virginia Conference during the 1934 college football season. Led by first-year head coach, Glenn Thistlethwaite, Richmond compiled an overall record of 8–1 with a mark of 2–1 in conference play, sharing the Virginia Conference title with William & Mary.

== Schedule ==
Date	Time	Opponent	Site	Result	Attendance	Source
September 29	2:30 p.m.	Roanoke	City Stadium; Richmond, VA	W 27–0		
October 6		at Cornell*	Schoellkopf Field; Ithaca, NY	W 6–0	2,100	
October 13		vs. Emory and Henry	Bluefield, WV	L 0–13	6,000	
October 20	2:30 p.m.	VMI*^{†}	City Stadium; Richmond, VA (rivalry)	W 7–0	9,000	
October 27	2:30 p.m.	Hampden–Sydney*	City Stadium; Richmond, VA	W 20–0		
November 3	2:30 p.m.	Georgetown*	City Stadium; Richmond, VA	W 14–13	8,000	
November 10	2:00 p.m.	Davis & Elkins*	City Stadium; Richmond, VA	W 7–0	6,000	
November 17	2:00 p.m.	Wake Forest	City Stadium; Richmond, VA	W 39–6		
November 29		William & Mary	City Stadium; Richmond, VA (rivalry)	W 6–0	15,000	
*Non-conference game; ^{†}Homecoming; All times are in Eastern time
