= 1934 Duke Blue Devils football team =

American college football season

1934 Duke Blue Devils football
- Conference: Southern Conference
- Record: 7–2 (3–1 SoCon)
- Head coach: Wallace Wade (4th season)
- Offensive scheme: Single-wing
- MVP: Earle Wentz
- Captain: Jack Dunlap
- Home stadium: Duke Stadium

1934 Southern Conference football standings
	Conf.					Overall
Team	W		L		T	W		L		T
Washington and Lee $	4	–	0	–	0	7	–	3	–	0
North Carolina	2	–	0	–	1	7	–	1	–	1
Duke	3	–	1	–	0	7	–	2	–	0
Maryland	3	–	1	–	0	7	–	3	–	0
Clemson	2	–	1	–	0	5	–	4	–	0
VPI	3	–	3	–	0	5	–	5	–	0
South Carolina	2	–	3	–	0	5	–	4	–	0
NC State	1	–	3	–	1	2	–	6	–	1
Virginia	1	–	4	–	0	3	–	6	–	0
VMI	0	–	5	–	0	1	–	8	–	0
$ – Conference champion

The 1934 Duke Blue Devils football team was an American football team that represented Duke University as a member of the Southern Conference during the 1934 college football season. In its fourth season under head coach Wallace Wade, the team compiled a 7–2 record (3–1 against conference opponents) and outscored opponents by a total of 185 to 40. Jack Dunlap was the team captain. The team played its home games at Duke Stadium in Durham, North Carolina.

== Schedule ==
Date	Opponent	Site	Result	Attendance	Source
September 29	at VMI	Alumni Field; Lexington, VA	W 46–0		
October 6	Clemson	Duke Stadium; Durham, NC	W 20–6	7,000	
October 13	Georgia Tech*^{†}	Duke Stadium; Durham, NC	W 20–0	30,000	
October 20	at Davidson*	Richardson Field; Davidson, NC	W 20–0	10,000	
October 27	at Tennessee*	Shields–Watkins Field; Knoxville, TN	L 6–14	20,000	
November 3	Auburn*	Legion Field; Birmingham, AL	W 13–6		
November 10	Wake Forest*	Duke Stadium; Durham, NC (rivalry)	W 28–7	7,000	
November 17	at North Carolina	Kenan Memorial Stadium; Chapel Hill, NC (rivalry)	L 0–7		
December 1	NC State	Duke Stadium; Durham, NC (rivalry)	W 32–0	9,000	
*Non-conference game; ^{†}Homecoming
