= 1934 South Dakota Coyotes football team =

American college football season

1934 South Dakota Coyotes football
- Conference: North Central Conference
- Record: 2–7 (0–4 NCC)
- Head coach: Harry Gamage (1st season)
- Home stadium: Inman Field

1934 North Central Conference football standings
	Conf.					Overall
Team	W		L		T	W		L		T
North Dakota $	3	–	1	–	0	7	–	1	–	0
North Dakota Agricultural	2	–	1	–	1	5	–	3	–	2
Morningside	2	–	1	–	1	4	–	3	–	1
South Dakota State	2	–	2	–	0	6	–	4	–	0
South Dakota	0	–	4	–	0	2	–	7	–	0
$ – Conference champion

The 1934 South Dakota Coyotes football team was an American football team that represented the University of South Dakota in the North Central Conference (NCC) during the 1934 college football season. In its first season under head coach Harry Gamage, the team compiled a 2–7 record (0–4 against NCC opponents), finished in last place in the NCC, and was outscored by a total of 173 to 73. The team played its home games at Inman Field in Vermillion, South Dakota.

== Schedule ==
Date	Opponent	Site	Result	Attendance	Source
September 22	Yankton*	Inman Field; Vermillion, SD	W 20–0		
September 29	at Iowa*	Iowa Stadium; Iowa City, IA	L 0–34		
October 6	North Dakota	Inman Field; Vermillion, SD	L 0–20		
October 12	at North Dakota Agricultural	Dacotah Field; Fargo, ND	L 0–20		
October 20	Western Union*	Inman Field; Vermillion, SD	W 46–0		
October 27	at South Dakota State	Brookings, SD	L 0–19		
November 3	Morningside^{†}	Inman Field; Vermillion, SD (Dakota Day)	L 0–14	5,000	
November 12	at Haskell*	Lawrence, KS	L 7–14	4,000	
November 17	at Catholic University*	Brookland Stadium; Washington, DC	L 0–57		
*Non-conference game; ^{†}Homecoming
