= 1934 VMI Keydets football team =

American college football season

1934 VMI Keydets football
- Conference: Southern Conference
- Record: 1–8 (0–5 SoCon)
- Head coach: W. C. Raftery (8th season)
- Home stadium: Alumni Field

1934 Southern Conference football standings
	Conf.					Overall
Team	W		L		T	W		L		T
Washington and Lee $	4	–	0	–	0	7	–	3	–	0
North Carolina	2	–	0	–	1	7	–	1	–	1
Duke	3	–	1	–	0	7	–	2	–	0
Maryland	3	–	1	–	0	7	–	3	–	0
Clemson	2	–	1	–	0	5	–	4	–	0
VPI	3	–	3	–	0	5	–	5	–	0
South Carolina	2	–	3	–	0	5	–	4	–	0
NC State	1	–	3	–	1	2	–	6	–	1
Virginia	1	–	4	–	0	3	–	6	–	0
VMI	0	–	5	–	0	1	–	8	–	0
$ – Conference champion

The 1934 VMI Keydets football team was an American football team that represented the Virginia Military Institute (VMI) during the 1934 college football season as a member of the Southern Conference. In their eighth year under head coach W. C. Raftery, the team compiled an overall record of 1–8.

== Schedule ==
Date	Time	Opponent	Site	Result	Attendance	Source
September 29		Duke	Alumni Field; Lexington, VA	L 0–46		
October 6		at South Carolina	Carolina Municipal Stadium; Columbia, SC	L 6–22	10,000	
October 13		at Columbia*	Baker Field; New York, NY	L 6–29	18,000	
October 20	2:30 p.m.	at Richmond*	City Stadium; Richmond, VA (rivalry)	L 0–7	9,000	
October 27		Virginia	Alumni Field; Lexington, VA	L 13–17	6,000	
November 3		vs. William & Mary*	Bain Field; Norfolk, VA (rivalry)	W 13–6	3,500	
November 12		at Maryland	Baltimore Stadium; Baltimore, MD	L 0–23	8,000	
November 17		at Davidson*	Richardson Field; Davidson, NC	L 13–27		
November 29		vs. VPI	Maher Field; Roanoke, VA (rivalry)	L 0–13	10,000	
*Non-conference game; All times are in Eastern time
