= 1934 Roanoke Maroons football team =

American college football season

1934 Roanoke Maroons football
- Conference: Virginia Conference
- Record: 5–5 (1–2 Virginia)
- Head coach: Gordon C. White (5th season)
- Home stadium: College Field; Maher Field

1934 Virginia Conference football standings
	Conf.					Overall
Team	W		L		T	W		L		T
Richmond +	2	–	1	–	0	8	–	1	–	0
William & Mary +	2	–	1	–	0	2	–	6	–	0
Emory and Henry	1	–	2	–	0	8	–	2	–	0
Roanoke	1	–	2	–	0	5	–	5	–	0
+ – Conference co-champions

The 1934 Roanoke Maroons football team represented Roanoke College as a member of the Virginia Conference during the 1934 college football season. Led by fifth-year head coach Gordon C. White, the Maroons compiled an overall record of 5–5, with a mark of 1–2 in conference play, and finished tied for third in the Virginia Conference.

== Schedule ==
Date	Time	Opponent	Site	Result	Attendance	Source
September 22		at VPI*	Miles Stadium; Blacksburg, VA	L 0–21		
September 29	2:30 p.m.	at Richmond	City Stadium; Richmond, VA	L 0–27		
October 6		Guilford*	College Field; Salem, VA	W 39–0		
October 13		at Langley Field*	Langley Field Gridiron; Hampton, VA	W 6–0		
October 20		at Emory and Henry	Fullerton Field; Emory, VA	W 19–0		
October 27		at William & Mary	Cary Field; Williamsburg, VA	L 6–15		
November 2		at Apprentice*	Apprentice Field; Newport News, VA	L 13–14	3,500	
November 9		at Georgetown*	Griffith Stadium; Washington, DC	L 0–20	3,000	
November 17		Baltimore*	College Field; Salem, VA	W 32–7		
November 24		Haskell*	Maher Field; Roanoke, VA	W 13–0	2,500–3,000	
*Non-conference game; All times are in Eastern time
