= 1934 North Carolina Tar Heels football team =

American college football season

1934 North Carolina Tar Heels football
- Conference: Southern Conference
- Record: 7–1–1 (2–0–1 SoCon)
- Head coach: Carl Snavely (1st season)
- Captain: George T. Barclay
- Home stadium: Kenan Memorial Stadium

1934 Southern Conference football standings
	Conf.					Overall
Team	W		L		T	W		L		T
Washington and Lee $	4	–	0	–	0	7	–	3	–	0
North Carolina	2	–	0	–	1	7	–	1	–	1
Duke	3	–	1	–	0	7	–	2	–	0
Maryland	3	–	1	–	0	7	–	3	–	0
Clemson	2	–	1	–	0	5	–	4	–	0
VPI	3	–	3	–	0	5	–	5	–	0
South Carolina	2	–	3	–	0	5	–	4	–	0
NC State	1	–	3	–	1	2	–	6	–	1
Virginia	1	–	4	–	0	3	–	6	–	0
VMI	0	–	5	–	0	1	–	8	–	0
$ – Conference champion

The 1934 North Carolina Tar Heels football team represented the University of North Carolina at Chapel Hill during the 1934 college football season. The Tar Heels were led by first-year head coach Carl Snavely and played their home games at Kenan Memorial Stadium. They competed as a member of the Southern Conference, finishing with an undefeated conference record of 2–0–1. North Carolina claims a conference championship for 1934, although the official conference champion is Washington and Lee, who finished 4–0–0.

Team captain and guard George T. Barclay became North Carolina's first first-team All-American, being selected by several selectors including the AP and the All-American Board. He later was the head coach at UNC from 1953 to 1955.

== Schedule ==
Date	Time	Opponent	Site	Result	Attendance	Source
September 29	2:30 p.m.	Wake Forest*	Kenan Memorial Stadium; Chapel Hill, NC (rivalry)	W 21–0	13,000	
October 6	2:30 p.m.	Tennessee*	Kenan Memorial Stadium; Chapel Hill, NC	L 7–19	10,000	
October 13	3:00 p.m.	at Georgia*	Sanford Stadium; Athens, GA	W 14–0	10,000	
October 20	2:00 p.m.	Kentucky*	Kenan Memorial Stadium; Chapel Hill, NC	W 6–0		
October 27	2:00 p.m.	NC State	Kenan Memorial Stadium; Chapel Hill, NC (rivalry)	T 7–7	14,000	
November 3	2:00 p.m.	at Georgia Tech*	Grant Field; Atlanta, GA	W 26–0		
November 10	2:30 p.m.	at Davidson*	Richardson Field; Davidson, NC	W 12–2	10,000	
November 17	2:00 p.m.	Duke	Kenan Memorial Stadium; Chapel Hill, NC (rivalry)	W 7–0	30,000	
November 29	2:00 p.m.	at Virginia	Scott Stadium; Charlottesville, VA (rivalry)	W 25–6	7,000	
*Non-conference game; All times are in Eastern time
