= 1934 North Dakota Agricultural Bison football team =

American college football season

1934 North Dakota Agricultural Bison football
- Conference: North Central Conference
- Record: 5–3–2 (2–1–1 NCC)
- Head coach: Casey Finnegan (6th season)
- Captain: Charles "Acey" Olson
- Home stadium: Dacotah Field

1934 North Central Conference football standings
	Conf.					Overall
Team	W		L		T	W		L		T
North Dakota $	3	–	1	–	0	7	–	1	–	0
North Dakota Agricultural	2	–	1	–	1	5	–	3	–	2
Morningside	2	–	1	–	1	4	–	3	–	1
South Dakota State	2	–	2	–	0	6	–	4	–	0
South Dakota	0	–	4	–	0	2	–	7	–	0
$ – Conference champion

The 1934 North Dakota Agricultural Bison football team was an American football team that represented North Dakota Agricultural College (now known as North Dakota State University) in the North Central Conference (NCC) during the 1934 college football season. In its sixth season under head coach Casey Finnegan, the team compiled a 5–3–2 record (2–1–1 against NCC opponents) and tied for second place out of five teams in the NCC. The team played its home games at Dacotah Field in Fargo, North Dakota.

== Schedule ==
Date	Time	Opponent	Site	Result	Attendance	Source
September 21		Concordia (MN)*	Dacotah Field; Fargo, ND	W 6–0		
September 29		at Minnesota*	Memorial Stadium; Minneapolis, MN	L 12–52	26,544	
October 5		St. Thomas (MN)*	Dacotah Field; Fargo, ND	W 27–0		
October 12		South Dakota	Dacotah Field; Fargo, ND	W 22–0		
October 20		at Morningside	Sioux City, IA	T 12–12	3,000	
October 27		North Dakota^{†}	Dacotah Field; Fargo, ND (rivalry)	W 7–0		
November 2		at Moorhead State*	Moorhead, MN	L 12–13		
November 10		at South Dakota State	State Field; Brookings, SD (rivalry)	L 0–38		
November 16	8:00 p.m.	at Oklahoma City*	Goldbug Field; Oklahoma City, OK	W 13–7		
November 23		at Texas Tech*	Tech Field; Lubbock, TX	T 20–20	3,500	
*Non-conference game; ^{†}Homecoming; All times are in Central time
