= 1934 NC State Wolfpack football team =

American college football season

1934 NC State Wolfpack football
- Conference: Southern Conference
- Record: 2–6–1 (1–3–1 SoCon)
- Head coach: Hunk Anderson (1st season)
- Home stadium: Riddick Stadium

1934 Southern Conference football standings
	Conf.					Overall
Team	W		L		T	W		L		T
Washington and Lee $	4	–	0	–	0	7	–	3	–	0
North Carolina	2	–	0	–	1	7	–	1	–	1
Duke	3	–	1	–	0	7	–	2	–	0
Maryland	3	–	1	–	0	7	–	3	–	0
Clemson	2	–	1	–	0	5	–	4	–	0
VPI	3	–	3	–	0	5	–	5	–	0
South Carolina	2	–	3	–	0	5	–	4	–	0
NC State	1	–	3	–	1	2	–	6	–	1
Virginia	1	–	4	–	0	3	–	6	–	0
VMI	0	–	5	–	0	1	–	8	–	0
$ – Conference champion

The 1934 NC State Wolfpack football team was an American football team that represented North Carolina State University as a member of the Southern Conference (SoCon) during the 1934 college football season. In its first season under head coach Hunk Anderson, the team compiled a 2–6–1 record (1–3–1 against SoCon opponents) and was outscored by a total of 112 to 44.

== Schedule ==
Date	Opponent	Site	Result	Attendance	Source
September 29	vs. Davidson*	World War Memorial Stadium; Greensboro, NC	W 7–0	12,000	
October 6	Wake Forest*	Riddick Stadium; Raleigh, NC (rivalry)	L 12–13	8,000	
October 13	South Carolina	Riddick Stadium; Raleigh, NC (rivalry)	W 6–0	7,000	
October 20	vs. Florida	Plant Field; Tampa, FL	L 0–14	12,000	
October 27	at North Carolina	Kenan Memorial Stadium; Chapel Hill, NC (rivalry)	T 7–7	14,000	
November 3	Clemson	Riddick Stadium; Raleigh, NC (rivalry)	L 6–12	7,000	
November 10	vs. VPI	Washington Street Park; Portsmouth, VA	L 6–7	7,000	
November 17	at Georgia*	Sanford Stadium; Athens, GA	L 0–27	8,000	
December 1	at Duke	Duke Stadium; Durham, NC (rivalry)	L 0–32	9,000	
*Non-conference game
