= 1934 Morningside Maroons football team =

American college football season

1934 Morningside Maroons football
- Conference: Iowa Conference, North Central Conference
- Record: 4–3–1 (1–2 Iowa, 2–1–1 NCC)
- Head coach: Jason M. Saunderson (23rd season)
- Home stadium: Stock Yards Park

1934 Iowa Conference football standings
	Conf.					Overall
Team	W		L		T	W		L		T
Simpson (IA) $	3	–	2	–	1	3	–	5	–	2
St. Ambrose	5	–	0	–	0	6	–	2	–	0
Parsons	5	–	1	–	0	6	–	2	–	0
Iowa State Teachers	1	–	0	–	2	3	–	3	–	2
Buena Vista	3	–	2	–	0	6	–	2	–	0
Upper Iowa	5	–	0	–	0	6	–	0	–	0
Dubuque	0	–	2	–	1	2	–	3	–	1
Luther	2	–	1	–	2	3	–	3	–	2
Morningside	1	–	2	–	0	4	–	3	–	1
Penn (IA)	1	–	3	–	1	2	–	4	–	1
Columbia (IA)	1	–	3	–	1	1	–	4	–	1
Western Union	0	–	3	–	0	0	–	7	–	0
Iowa Wesleyan	1	–	4	–	1	3	–	5	–	1
Central (IA)	1	–	6	–	1	1	–	6	–	1
$ – Conference champion; Conference standings were based on Stanley-Dean ranking.

1934 North Central Conference football standings
	Conf.					Overall
Team	W		L		T	W		L		T
North Dakota $	3	–	1	–	0	7	–	1	–	0
North Dakota Agricultural	2	–	1	–	1	5	–	3	–	2
Morningside	2	–	1	–	1	4	–	3	–	1
South Dakota State	2	–	2	–	0	6	–	4	–	0
South Dakota	0	–	4	–	0	2	–	7	–	0
$ – Conference champion

The 1934 Morningside Maroons football team was an American football that represented Morningside College as a member of the during the Iowa Conference and North Central Conference (NCC) during the 1934 college football season. Led by 23rd-year head coach Jason M. Saunderson, the Maroons compiled an overall record of 4–3–1 with a mark of 1–2 in Iowa Conference play, placing ninth, and 2–1–1 against NCC opponents, tying for second place.

== Schedule ==
Date	Opponent	Site	Result	Attendance	Source
September 22	Western Union	Sioux City, IA	W 46–0		
September 29	Wayne State (NE)*	Stock Yards Park; Sioux City, IA	W 13–6	1,800	
October 6	South Dakota State	Stock Yards Park; Sioux City, IA	W 13–7		
October 12	at North Dakota	Memorial Stadium; Grand Forks, ND	L 0–25		
October 20	North Dakota Agricultural	Sioux City, IA	T 12–12	3,000	
November 3	at South Dakota	Inman Field; Vermillion, SD	W 14–0	5,000	
November 10	at Buena Vista	Storm Lake, IA	L 6–7		
November 17	at Iowa State Teachers	Cedar Falls, IA	L 2–32		
*Non-conference game
