= 1928 North Dakota Agricultural Bison football team =

American college football season

1928 North Dakota Agricultural Bison football
- Conference: North Central Conference
- Record: 3–4–1 (1–3 NCC)
- Head coach: Stanley Borleske (6th season)
- Captain: George Hays
- Home stadium: Dacotah Field

1928 North Central Conference football standings
	Conf.					Overall
Team	W		L		T	W		L		T
North Dakota $	4	–	0	–	0	6	–	1	–	1
South Dakota State	3	–	1	–	0	9	–	1	–	0
Morningside	1	–	3	–	0	5	–	4	–	0
North Dakota Agricultural	1	–	3	–	0	3	–	4	–	1
South Dakota	1	–	3	–	0	3	–	5	–	0
$ – Conference champion

The 1928 North Dakota Agricultural Bison football team was an American football team that represented North Dakota Agricultural College (now known as North Dakota State University) in the North Central Conference (NCC) during the 1928 college football season. In its sixth season under head coach Stanley Borleske, the team compiled a 3–4–1 record (1–3 against NCC opponents) and finished in a three-way tie for third/last place out of five teams in the NCC. The team played its home games at Dacotah Field in Fargo, North Dakota.

== Schedule ==
Date	Time	Opponent	Site	Result	Source
September 29		Valley City State*	Dacotah Field; Fargo, ND	W 21–0	
October 6		Superior Normal*	Dacotah Field; Fargo, ND	T 0–0	
October 13		at Wisconsin*	Camp Randall Stadium; Madison, WI	L 7–13	
October 20		St. Thomas (MN)*	Dacotah Field; Fargo, ND	W 18–0	
October 28		North Dakota	Dacotah Field; Fargo, ND (rivalry)	L 0–18	
November 3	2:30 p.m.	at Morningside	Bass Field; Sioux City, IA	W 12–0	
November 10		at South Dakota State	Brookings, SD (rivalry)	L 6–27	
November 17		at South Dakota	Inman Field; Vermillion, SD	L 6–26	
*Non-conference game; All times are in Central time
