= 1934 William & Mary Indians football team =

American college football season

1934 William & Mary Indians football

Virginia Conference co-champion
- Conference: Virginia Conference
- Record: 2–6 (2–1 Virginia)
- Head coach: John Kellison (4th season)
- Captain: Joe Bridgers

1934 Virginia Conference football standings
	Conf.					Overall
Team	W		L		T	W		L		T
Richmond +	2	–	1	–	0	8	–	1	–	0
William & Mary +	2	–	1	–	0	2	–	6	–	0
Emory and Henry	1	–	2	–	0	8	–	2	–	0
Roanoke	1	–	2	–	0	5	–	5	–	0
+ – Conference co-champions

The 1934 William & Mary Indians football team represented the College of William & Mary as a member of the Virginia Conference during the 1934 college football season. Led by John Kellison in his fourth and final season as head coach, the Indians compiled an overall record of 2–6 with a mark of 2–1 in conference play, sharing the Virginia Conference title with Richmond.

== Schedule ==
Date	Opponent	Site	Result	Attendance	Source
September 29	at Navy*	Thompson Stadium; Annapolis, MD	L 7–20	18,000	
October 6	Emory and Henry	Cary Field; Williamsburg, VA	W 20–8		
October 13	vs. VPI*	City Stadium; Richmond, VA	L 0–6	9,000	
October 20	at Georgetown*	Griffith Stadium; Washington, DC	L 0–3	5,000	
October 27	Roanoke	Cary Field; Williamsburg, VA	W 15–6		
November 3	vs. VMI*	Norfolk, VA (rivalry)	L 6–13	3,500	
November 17	Washington and Lee*^{†}	Cary Field; Williamsburg, VA	L 0–7	4,000	
November 29	at Richmond	City Stadium; Richmond, VA (rivalry)	L 0–6	15,000	
*Non-conference game; ^{†}Homecoming; Source:
