= Cambria, Virginia =

Unincorporated community in Virginia, United States

Cambria
- Neighborhood
- Location within the state of Virginia Cambria (the United States)
- Coordinates: 37°8′35″N 80°23′45″W
- Country: United States
- State: Virginia
- County: Montgomery
- Elevation: 2,100 ft (640 m)
- Time zone: UTC−5 (Eastern (EST))
  - Summer (DST): UTC−4 (EDT)
- GNIS feature ID: 1674492

Cambria is a neighborhood of the town of Christiansburg, Montgomery County, Virginia, United States. Originally an independent town from Christiansburg, Cambria stretches along Cambria Road, extending north of the Train Depot on Depot Street. It is part of the Blacksburg-Christiansburg Metropolitan Statistical Area, which encompasses all of Montgomery County, Virginia and the Virginia cities of Blacksburg, Christiansburg, and Radford for statistical purposes.

A post office was established at Cambria in 1890, and remained in operation until it was discontinued in 1965.
