= Dixie University =

Dixie University was a short-lived college in downtown Dallas, Texas that was chartered in 1933 by the Somerville Law School partly to expand into a liberal arts college, and partly to create a home for the displaced 1932 Jefferson Rangers football team to relocate. The law school was re-branded in the spring of 1933 and held its first Dixie Law School graduation then. In the fall of 1933 Dixie University opened with 400 students in the law school and the brand-new undergraduate colleges. However, by the spring of 1935 Dixie had failed and the liberal arts college shut its doors without notice. Somerville Law School, founded in 1929, carried on until 1947 before it eventually closed, too.

== History ==
Based in downtown Dallas at the old YMCA Building, Dixie opened the 1933 fall semester with its law school and its new schools of Commerce, Public administration and Accounting. Charles L. Somerville, the founder of Somerville Law and Dixie, also wanted to compete in college athletics. In 1933 he brought in a ready-made football team and in 1934 he brought in a ready-made women's basketball team. Dixie was not destined to be a success and as quickly as things started, the college soon foundered. The 1933 Dixie Rebels football team (formerly the Jefferson University Rangers of 1932) was mediocre at best in the 1933 season, and in 1934, the team finished 0-7 and never played another game (1934 Dixie Rebels football team). The imported 1934 Dixie Rebels women's basketball team had played the previous years as the well-known Dallas Golden Cyclones, counting Babe Zaharias as one of its former players. National champions in 1931, the team got off to a good start in the 1934 season, but then was trounced in the quarter-finals of the national tournament by the defending champions, and never played another game.

The college's demise paralleled that of the football and basketball teams. By 1935 Dixie University was closed permanently without any mention in the local papers. Somerville Law School, originally founded in Wichita Falls, TX, and at one point operating five other branches around the state, reverted to the Somerville name and pared itself down to just the Dallas location. Law degrees were handed out as "Dixie University Law School” for just two years.

== Notable alumni ==
- Samuel P. Cochran, insurance executive, Grand Master of the Texas Masonic Lodge, and philanthropist.
- Anton T. Rutgers von Rozenburg, German World War I aviator and wingman for the Red Baron
