= 1934 South Georgia Teachers Blue Tide football team =

American college football season

1934 South Georgia Teachers Blue Tide football
- Conference: Independent
- Record: 4–5
- Head coach: Crook Smith (6th season)

1934 Southern college football independents records
	Conf.			Overall
Team	W	L	T	W		L		T
Western Maryland		–		8	–	0	–	1
No. 7 Navy		–		8	–	1	–	0
Tennessee State		–		6	–	1	–	1
Texas A&I		–		5	–	1	–	1
Troy State		–		7	–	2	–	0
Tulsa		–		5	–	2	–	1
George Washington		–		6	–	3	–	1
Tampa		–		8	–	4	–	0
West Virginia		–		6	–	4	–	0
Oglethorpe		–		5	–	4	–	1
Delaware		–		4	–	3	–	1
Georgetown		–		4	–	3	–	1
Texas Mines		–		4	–	4	–	0
Catholic University		–		3	–	4	–	1
Jacksonville State		–		3	–	4	–	0
South Georgia Teachers		–		4	–	5	–	0
William & Mary Norfolk		–		2	–	4	–	2
Wake Forest		–		3	–	7	–	0
East Carolina		–		1	–	4	–	1
Oklahoma City		–		1	–	8	–	0
Dixie (TX)		–		0	–	7	–	0
Rankings from Associated Press

The 1934 South Georgia Teachers Blue Tide football team represented the South Georgia Teachers College—now known as Georgia Southern University—during the 1934 college football season. The team was led by Crook Smith in his sixth year as head coach.

== Schedule ==
Date	Time	Opponent	Site	Result	Attendance	Source
September 28		at Troy State	Pace Field; Troy, AL	L 12–19	1,500	
October 5		at Brewton–Parker	Mount Vernon, GA	L 0–6		
October 12		Tampa	Statesboro, GA	W 21–13		
October 19		at Stetson	Deland, FL	L 0–19		
October 26		Appalachian State	Statesboro, GA (rivalry)	W 22–13		
November 2	3:15 p.m.	Middle Georgia	Statesboro, GA	W 6–0		
November 9		at South Georgia State	Douglas, GA	W 19–0		
November 16	3:00 p.m.	at Georgia Military	Milledgeville, GA	L 0–19		
November 29		Newberry^{†}	Statesboro, GA	L 20–21		
^{†}Homecoming; All times are in Eastern time
