= 1934 Troy State Red Wave football team =

American college football season

1934 Troy State Red Wave football
- Conference: Independent
- Record: 7–2
- Head coach: Albert Elmore (4th season)
- Home stadium: Pace Field

1934 Southern college football independents records
	Conf.			Overall
Team	W	L	T	W		L		T
Western Maryland		–		8	–	0	–	1
No. 7 Navy		–		8	–	1	–	0
Tennessee State		–		6	–	1	–	1
Texas A&I		–		5	–	1	–	1
Troy State		–		7	–	2	–	0
Tulsa		–		5	–	2	–	1
George Washington		–		6	–	3	–	1
Tampa		–		8	–	4	–	0
West Virginia		–		6	–	4	–	0
Oglethorpe		–		5	–	4	–	1
Delaware		–		4	–	3	–	1
Georgetown		–		4	–	3	–	1
Texas Mines		–		4	–	4	–	0
Catholic University		–		3	–	4	–	1
Jacksonville State		–		3	–	4	–	0
South Georgia Teachers		–		4	–	5	–	0
William & Mary Norfolk		–		2	–	4	–	2
Wake Forest		–		3	–	7	–	0
East Carolina		–		1	–	4	–	1
Oklahoma City		–		1	–	8	–	0
Dixie (TX)		–		0	–	7	–	0
Rankings from Associated Press

The 1934 Troy State Red Wave football team represented Troy State Teachers College (now known as Troy University) as an independent during the 1934 college football season. Led by fourth-year head coach Albert Elmore, the Red Wave compiled an overall record of 7–2.

== Schedule ==
Date	Opponent	Site	Result	Attendance	Source
September 22	at Spring Hill	Mobile, AL	L 0–8		
September 28	South Georgia Teachers	Pace Field; Troy, AL	W 19–12	1,500	
October 6	at South Georgia State	Douglas, GA	W 7–6		
October 13	Pensacola NAS	Pace Field; Troy, AL	W 35–12		
October 19	vs. Middle Georgia	Americus, GA	W 14–0		
October 27	Jacksonville State	Pace Field; Troy, AL (rivalry)	W 32–0		
November 9	Birmingham–Southern freshmen	Pace Field; Troy, AL	W 20–0		
November 24	Marion	Pace Field; Troy, AL	W 40–6		
November 29	Tampa	Pace Field; Troy, AL	L 2–6		
