= Warren E. Tilson =

American football player and coach (1902–1984)

Biographical details
- Born: June 8, 1902; Motley County, Texas, U.S.
- Died: March 3, 1984 (aged 81); Albemarle County, Virginia, U.S.

Playing career
- 1922–1925: Washington and Lee
- Position: Tackle

Coaching career (HC unless noted)
- 1926–1931: Duke (line)
- 1932: Washington and Lee (assistant)
- 1933–1940: Washington and Lee

Head coaching record
- Overall: 31–36–6

Accomplishments and honors

Championships
- 1 SoCon (1934)

Warren Edward "Tex" Tilson (June 8, 1902 –March 3, 1984) was an American college football player and coach for the Washington and Lee Generals. He was the brother of Sumner D. Tilson. He was captain of the 1924 football team, and also wrestled. As a coach, he led 1934 Washington and Lee Generals football team to the Southern Conference championship. Tilson also founded the Rockbridge fox hunt.

== Head coaching record ==
Year	Team	Overall	Conference	Standing	Bowl/playoffs
Washington and Lee Generals (Southern Conference) (1933–1940)
1933	Washington and Lee	4–4–2	1–1–1	T–5th	
1934	Washington and Lee	7–3	4–0	1st	
1935	Washington and Lee	3–4–1	1–3–1	7th	
1936	Washington and Lee	4–5	2–2	T–8th	
1937	Washington and Lee	4–5	2–3	T–8th	
1938	Washington and Lee	4–4–1	2–2	6th	
1939	Washington and Lee	3–4–1	1–2	10th	
1940	Washington and Lee	2–7–1	1–1–1	9th	
Washington and Lee:		31–36–6	14–14–3		
Total:		31–36–6			
National championship Conference title Conference division title or championship game berth
