= 1934 Dixie Rebels football team =

American college football season

1934 Dixie Rebels football
- Conference: Independent
- Record: 0–7
- Head coach: Virgil W. "Buster" Cook (1st season)
- Captain: John Dashfield

1934 Southern college football independents records
	Conf.			Overall
Team	W	L	T	W		L		T
Western Maryland		–		8	–	0	–	1
No. 7 Navy		–		8	–	1	–	0
Tennessee State		–		6	–	1	–	1
Texas A&I		–		5	–	1	–	1
Troy State		–		7	–	2	–	0
Tulsa		–		5	–	2	–	1
George Washington		–		6	–	3	–	1
Tampa		–		8	–	4	–	0
West Virginia		–		6	–	4	–	0
Oglethorpe		–		5	–	4	–	1
Delaware		–		4	–	3	–	1
Georgetown		–		4	–	3	–	1
Texas Mines		–		4	–	4	–	0
Catholic University		–		3	–	4	–	1
Jacksonville State		–		3	–	4	–	0
South Georgia Teachers		–		4	–	5	–	0
William & Mary Norfolk		–		2	–	4	–	2
Wake Forest		–		3	–	7	–	0
East Carolina		–		1	–	4	–	1
Oklahoma City		–		1	–	8	–	0
Dixie (TX)		–		0	–	7	–	0
Rankings from Associated Press

The 1934 Dixie Rebels football team was an American football team that represented Dixie University (affiliated with Somerville School of Law) during the 1934 college football season. In its second and final season of college football, Dixie compiled a record of 0–7, managing to score just two touchdowns during the entire season. With the departure of head coach Nick Dobbs toward the end of the 1933 season, the Dixie football program floundered, and after the end of the 1934 season, the team was disbanded and never played another game. Dixie University itself closed, too, albeit without any formal notification, as all references to Dixie vanished by 1935.

== Schedule ==
Date	Opponent	Site	Result	Attendance	Source
September 27	at East Texas Baptist	Fair Park Stadium; Marshall, TX	L 0–61	5,000	
October 11	at University of San Antonio	San Antonio, TX	L 0-31		
October 13	at Texas A&I	Kingsville, TX	L 0–71		
October 19	at John Tarleton	Stephenville, TX	L 0–46		
November 3	at Trinity (TX) freshmen	Yoakum Field; Waxahachie, TX	L 6–12		
November 7	at Wesley College	Phillips Field; Greenville, TX	L 0–32		
November 24	at Clifton	Clifton, TX	L 6–34		
