= Cy Kahl =

American football player (1904–1971)

Profile
- Position: Back

Personal information
- Born: November 29, 1904; Heaton, North Dakota, U.S.
- Died: July 30, 1971 (aged 66); Portsmouth, Ohio, U.S.
- Listed height: 6 ft 1 in (1.85 m)
- Listed weight: 194 lb (88 kg)

Career information
- High school: Jefferson (VA)
- College: North Dakota

Career history
- Portsmouth Spartans (1930–1931)
- Stats at Pro Football Reference

Cyrus Paul Kahl (November 29, 1904 – July 30, 1971) was an American football player. He played college football as the fullback for the North Dakota Flickertails and led the team to consecutive conference championships in 1928 and 1929. He then played professional football in the National Football League (NFL) as a back for the Portsmouth Spartans in 1930 and 1931. He appeared in 11 games during the 1930 season.
