= 1934 Wake Forest Demon Deacons football team =

American college football season

1934 Wake Forest Demon Deacons football
- Conference: Independent
- Record: 3–7
- Head coach: Jim Weaver (2nd season)
- Captain: Pat Swan
- Home stadium: Gore Field

1934 Southern college football independents records
| | Conf. | | | Overall |
| Team | W | L | T | W | | L | | T |
|---|---|---|---|---|---|---|---|---|
| Western Maryland | | – | | 8 | – | 0 | – | 1 |
| No. 7 Navy | | – | | 8 | – | 1 | – | 0 |
| Texas A&I | | – | | 5 | – | 1 | – | 1 |
| Troy State | | – | | 7 | – | 2 | – | 0 |
| Tulsa | | – | | 5 | – | 2 | – | 1 |
| George Washington | | – | | 6 | – | 3 | – | 1 |
| West Virginia | | – | | 6 | – | 4 | – | 0 |
| Oglethorpe | | – | | 5 | – | 4 | – | 1 |
| Delaware | | – | | 4 | – | 3 | – | 1 |
| Georgetown | | – | | 4 | – | 3 | – | 1 |
| Texas Mines | | – | | 4 | – | 4 | – | 0 |
| Catholic University | | – | | 3 | – | 4 | – | 1 |
| Jacksonville State | | – | | 3 | – | 4 | – | 0 |
| South Georgia Teachers | | – | | 4 | – | 5 | – | 0 |
| William & Mary Norfolk | | – | | 2 | – | 4 | – | 2 |
| Wake Forest | | – | | 3 | – | 7 | – | 0 |
| East Carolina | | – | | 1 | – | 4 | – | 1 |
| Oklahoma City | | – | | 1 | – | 8 | – | 0 |
| Dixie (TX) | | – | | 0 | – | 7 | – | 0 |
Rankings from Associated Press

The 1934 Wake Forest Demon Deacons football team was an American football team that represented Wake Forest College (now known as Wake Forest University) during the 1934 college football season. In its second season under head coach Jim Weaver, the team compiled a 3–7 record.

== Schedule ==
| Date | Time | Opponent | Site | Result | Attendance | Source |
|---|---|---|---|---|---|---|
| September 22 | | Guilford | Gore Field; Wake Forest, NC | W 62–0 | 3,000 | |
| September 29 | | at North Carolina | Kenan Memorial Stadium; Chapel Hill, NC (rivalry) | L 0–21 | 13,000 | |
| October 6 | | at NC State | Riddick Stadium; Raleigh, NC (rivalry) | W 13–12 | 8,000 | |
| October 11 | 2:30 p.m. | vs. Furman | Pee Dee Fair; Florence, SC | L 2–3 | | |
| October 20 | | Presbyterian | Gore Field; Wake Forest, NC | W 14–6 | 3,500 | |
| October 26 | | at George Washington | Griffith Stadium; Washington, DC | L 2–6 | | |
| November 3 | | at Emory and Henry | Fullerton Field; Emory, VA | L 0–13 | | |
| November 10 | | at Duke | Duke Stadium; Durham, NC (rivalry) | L 7–28 | 7,000 | |
| November 17 | 2:00 p.m. | at Richmond | City Stadium; Richmond, VA | L 6–39 | | |
| November 29 | | at Davidson | Richardson Field; Davidson, NC | L 12–13 | 5,500 | |
All times are in Eastern time
