= 1934 William & Mary Norfolk Division Braves football team =

American college football season

1934 William & Mary Norfolk Division Braves football
- Conference: Independent
- Record: 2–4–2
- Head coach: Tommy Scott (5th season)
- Home stadium: Larchmont playing field

1934 Southern college football independents records
	Conf.			Overall
Team	W	L	T	W		L		T
Western Maryland		–		8	–	0	–	1
No. 7 Navy		–		8	–	1	–	0
Texas A&I		–		5	–	1	–	1
Troy State		–		7	–	2	–	0
Tulsa		–		5	–	2	–	1
George Washington		–		6	–	3	–	1
West Virginia		–		6	–	4	–	0
Oglethorpe		–		5	–	4	–	1
Delaware		–		4	–	3	–	1
Georgetown		–		4	–	3	–	1
Texas Mines		–		4	–	4	–	0
Catholic University		–		3	–	4	–	1
Jacksonville State		–		3	–	4	–	0
South Georgia Teachers		–		4	–	5	–	0
William & Mary Norfolk		–		2	–	4	–	2
Wake Forest		–		3	–	7	–	0
East Carolina		–		1	–	4	–	1
Oklahoma City		–		1	–	8	–	0
Dixie (TX)		–		0	–	7	–	0
Rankings from Associated Press

The 1934 William & Mary Norfolk Division Braves football team represented the Norfolk Division of the College of William & Mary, now known as Old Dominion University, during the 1934 college football season. Led by fifth-year head coach Tommy Scott, the Braves compiled a record of 2–4–2.

== Schedule ==
Date	Time	Opponent	Site	Result	Source
October 5		Potomac State	Norfolk, VA	L 6–32	
October 12		at Louisburg	Louisburg, NC	L 0–45	
October 19		South Norfolk High School (VA)	Norfolk, VA	W 14–0	
October 27		at Shenandoah	Harrisonburg, VA	L 0–27	
November 2	3:15 p.m.	Cape Charles Athletic Club	Larchmont playing field; Norfolk, VA	W 39–0	
November 9		William & Mary freshmen	Norfolk, VA	L 0–18	
November 16		at East Carolina	Greenville, NC	T 0–0	
November 23		Hopewell High School	Larchmont playing field; Norfolk, VA	T 7–7	
All times are in Eastern time

=== Reserve team ===
Date	Opponent	Site	Result	Source
October 10	at Norfolk NAS	Naval Base stadium; Norfolk, VA	L 0–6	
