= 1934 Navy Midshipmen football team =

American college football season

1934 Navy Midshipmen football
- Conference: Independent
- Record: 8–1
- Head coach: Tom Hamilton (1st season)
- Captain: Dick Burns
- Home stadium: Thompson Stadium

1934 Southern college football independents records
	Conf.			Overall
Team	W	L	T	W		L		T
Western Maryland		–		8	–	0	–	1
No. 7 Navy		–		8	–	1	–	0
Texas A&I		–		5	–	1	–	1
Troy State		–		7	–	2	–	0
Tulsa		–		5	–	2	–	1
George Washington		–		6	–	3	–	1
West Virginia		–		6	–	4	–	0
Oglethorpe		–		5	–	4	–	1
Delaware		–		4	–	3	–	1
Georgetown		–		4	–	3	–	1
Texas Mines		–		4	–	4	–	0
Catholic University		–		3	–	4	–	1
Jacksonville State		–		3	–	4	–	0
South Georgia Teachers		–		4	–	5	–	0
William & Mary Norfolk		–		2	–	4	–	2
Wake Forest		–		3	–	7	–	0
East Carolina		–		1	–	4	–	1
Oklahoma City		–		1	–	8	–	0
Dixie (TX)		–		0	–	7	–	0
Rankings from Associated Press

The 1934 Navy Midshipmen football team represented the United States Naval Academy during the 1934 college football season. In their first season under head coach Tom Hamilton, the Midshipmen compiled a 8–1 record and outscored their opponents by a combined score of 138 to 70.

== Schedule ==
Date	Opponent	Site	Result	Attendance	Source
September 29	William & Mary	Thompson Stadium; Annapolis, MD	W 20–7		
October 6	vs. Virginia	Griffith Stadium; Washington, DC	W 21–6	12,000	
October 13	Maryland	Thompson Stadium; Annapolis, MD (rivalry)	W 16–13	22,004	
October 20	at Columbia	Baker Field; New York, NY	W 18–7		
October 27	at Penn	Franklin Field; Philadelphia, PA	W 17–0		
November 3	Washington and Lee	Thompson Stadium; Annapolis, MD	W 26–0	22,000	
November 10	vs. Notre Dame	Municipal Stadium; Cleveland OH (rivalry)	W 10–6	54,571	
November 17	Pittsburgh	Thompson Stadium; Annapolis, MD	L 7–31	25,000	
December 1	vs. Army	Franklin Field; Philadelphia, PA (Army–Navy Game)	W 3–0		
