= 1934 Catholic University Cardinals football team =

American college football season

1934 Catholic University Cardinals football
- Conference: Independent
- Record: 4–3–1
- Head coach: Dutch Bergman (5th season)
- Home stadium: Brookland Stadium

1934 Southern college football independents records
	Conf.			Overall
Team	W	L	T	W		L		T
Western Maryland		–		8	–	0	–	1
No. 7 Navy		–		8	–	1	–	0
Texas A&I		–		5	–	1	–	1
Troy State		–		7	–	2	–	0
Tulsa		–		5	–	2	–	1
George Washington		–		6	–	3	–	1
West Virginia		–		6	–	4	–	0
Oglethorpe		–		5	–	4	–	1
Delaware		–		4	–	3	–	1
Georgetown		–		4	–	3	–	1
Texas Mines		–		4	–	4	–	0
Catholic University		–		3	–	4	–	1
Jacksonville State		–		3	–	4	–	0
South Georgia Teachers		–		4	–	5	–	0
William & Mary Norfolk		–		2	–	4	–	2
Wake Forest		–		3	–	7	–	0
East Carolina		–		1	–	4	–	1
Oklahoma City		–		1	–	8	–	0
Dixie (TX)		–		0	–	7	–	0
Rankings from Associated Press

The 1934 Catholic University Cardinals football team was an American football team that represented the Catholic University of America as an independent during the 1934 college football season. In its fourth year under head coach Dutch Bergman, the team compiled a 4–3–1 record and outscored opponents by a total of 194 to 39.

== Schedule ==
Date	Opponent	Site	Result	Attendance	Source
October 6	La Salle	Brookland Stadium; Washington, DC	T 6–6	3,500	
October 13	Holy Cross	Fitton Field; Worcester, MA	L 6–17	7,500	
October 20	Baltimore	Brookland Stadium; Washington, DC	W 62–0		
October 27	at Manhattan	Ebbets Field; Brooklyn, NY	W 31–0	7,500	
November 3	Western Maryland	Brookland Stadium; Washington, DC	L 0–2	15,000	
November 10	Oglethorpe	Brookland Stadium; Washington, DC	W 32–0		
November 17	South Dakota	Brookland Stadium; Washington, DC	W 57–0		
November 24	Duquesne	Forbes Field; Pittsburgh, PA	L 0–14	7,500	
