= 1934 Jacksonville State Eagle Owls football team =

American college football season

1934 Jacksonville State Eagle Owls football
- Conference: Independent
- Record: 3–4
- Head coach: T. B. Shotts (4th season)
- Home stadium: College Field

1934 Southern college football independents records
	Conf.			Overall
Team	W	L	T	W		L		T
Western Maryland		–		8	–	0	–	1
No. 7 Navy		–		8	–	1	–	0
Texas A&I		–		5	–	1	–	1
Troy State		–		7	–	2	–	0
Tulsa		–		5	–	2	–	1
George Washington		–		6	–	3	–	1
West Virginia		–		6	–	4	–	0
Oglethorpe		–		5	–	4	–	1
Delaware		–		4	–	3	–	1
Georgetown		–		4	–	3	–	1
Texas Mines		–		4	–	4	–	0
Catholic University		–		3	–	4	–	1
Jacksonville State		–		3	–	4	–	0
South Georgia Teachers		–		4	–	5	–	0
William & Mary Norfolk		–		2	–	4	–	2
Wake Forest		–		3	–	7	–	0
East Carolina		–		1	–	4	–	1
Oklahoma City		–		1	–	8	–	0
Dixie (TX)		–		0	–	7	–	0
Rankings from Associated Press

The 1934 Jacksonville State Eagle Owls football team represented Jacksonville State Teachers College (now known as Jacksonville State University) as an independent during the 1934 college football season. Led by fourth-year head coach T. B. Shotts, the Eagle Owls compiled an overall record of 3–4.

== Schedule ==
Date	Opponent	Site	Result	Source
October 13	at Marion	Johnson Field; Marion, AL	W 20–0	
October 20	East Mississippi	College Field; Jacksonville, AL	W 19–7	
October 27	at Troy State	Pace Field; Troy, AL (rivalry)	L 0–32	
November 3	at Piedmont	Demorest, GA	L 0–7	
November 5	at Western Carolina	Cullowhee, NC	L 7–18	
November 9	Bowdon College	College Field; Jacksonville, AL	W 20–6	
November 25	at Pensacola NAS	Legion Field; Pensacola, FL	Canceled	
November 29	at Cumberland (TN)	Lebanon, TN	L 7–41	
