= 1934 West Virginia Mountaineers football team =

American college football season

1934 West Virginia Mountaineers football
- Conference: Independent
- Record: 6–4
- Head coach: Charles Tallman (1st season)
- Captains: Herbert Stewart; John Vargo
- Home stadium: Mountaineer Field

1934 Southern college football independents records
	Conf.			Overall
Team	W	L	T	W		L		T
Western Maryland		–		8	–	0	–	1
No. 7 Navy		–		8	–	1	–	0
Texas A&I		–		5	–	1	–	1
Troy State		–		7	–	2	–	0
Tulsa		–		5	–	2	–	1
George Washington		–		6	–	3	–	1
West Virginia		–		6	–	4	–	0
Oglethorpe		–		5	–	4	–	1
Delaware		–		4	–	3	–	1
Georgetown		–		4	–	3	–	1
Texas Mines		–		4	–	4	–	0
Catholic University		–		3	–	4	–	1
Jacksonville State		–		3	–	4	–	0
South Georgia Teachers		–		4	–	5	–	0
William & Mary Norfolk		–		2	–	4	–	2
Wake Forest		–		3	–	7	–	0
East Carolina		–		1	–	4	–	1
Oklahoma City		–		1	–	8	–	0
Dixie (TX)		–		0	–	7	–	0
Rankings from Associated Press

The 1934 West Virginia Mountaineers football team was an American football team that represented West Virginia University as an independent during the 1934 college football season. In its first season under head coach Charles Tallman, the team compiled a 6–4 record and outscored opponents by a total of 117 to 113. The team played its home games at Mountaineer Field in Morgantown, West Virginia. Herbert Stewart and John Vargo were the team captains.

== Schedule ==
Date	Opponent	Site	Result	Attendance	Source
September 22	West Virginia Wesleyan	Mountaineer Field; Morgantown, WV	W 19–0		
September 28	at Duquesne	Forbes Field; Pittsburgh, PA	W 7–0	25,000	
October 6	Pittsburgh	Mountaineer Field; Morgantown, WV (rivalry)	L 6–27	18,000	
October 13	vs. Washington and Lee	Laidley Field; Charleston, WV	W 12–0		
October 19	at Temple	Temple Stadium; Philadelphia, PA	L 13–28	18,000	
October 27	Davis & Elkins	Mountaineer Field; Morgantown, WV	W 12–7		
November 3	vs. Ohio	Parkersburg, WV	W 7–2		
November 10	at Fordham	Polo Grounds; New York, NY	L 20–27		
November 17	George Washington	Mountaineer Field; Morgantown, WV	L 7–10		
November 29	vs. Washington & Jefferson	Atlantic City Convention Hall; Atlantic City, NJ	W 14–12	4,000	
