= Hobo Day =

Celebration at South Dakota State University

Coordinates: 44°19′10″N 96°46′59″W

Hobo Day is the homecoming celebration for South Dakota State University. It is usually celebrated in October. 2012 marked the 100th Anniversary of Hobo Day. The Hobo Day parade has been canceled just three times: once during World War I, a second time in 1942 during World War II, and a third in 2020 due to COVID-19.

== Origin of Hobo Day ==
The origin of Hobo Day can be traced back to 1907. A sequence of events occurred that spurred the homecoming celebration that is celebrated today.

In the fall of 1907, SDSU (then South Dakota State College) played Dakota Wesleyan at home in Brookings, South Dakota. The students, hungry for a win, participated in a "Nightshirt Parade" to stir up enthusiasm for the upcoming game. The men dressed in their nightshirts and women dressed in sheets. The students continued the tradition every homecoming day until in 1911, when the college administration deemed it undignified and un-ladylike for women to dress up in sheets and wander the streets. As a result, the homecoming tradition was ended and a new one needed to form.

A student by the name of R. Adams Dutcher brought up a concept he had seen attempted at the University of Missouri that had students dress up as hobos and bums that was ultimately dropped from their homecoming celebrations for various reasons. Without a real event to partake in during homecoming, the concept took wing with much enthusiasm from the student body.

The first Hobo Day occurred November 2, 1912. The men were to grow beards for approximately one month and the women were to dress as Indian maidens on Hobo Day. After all the preparation was complete, the entire student body participating in Hobo Day journeyed to the train station to meet the opposing football team. According to the student newspaper, "The onlooker could not have told whether he was in an 1849 Indian village or a Twentieth Century division point on the Northwestern railroad." The new homecoming celebration was a huge success and is still currently in place.

== Parade ==
The Hobo Day parade also included floats built by students that drove down the main street. During the 1940s and 50s, the floats were described as "enormous and spectacular." Due to safety concerns and collapsing floats due to their enormous size, the floats were built smaller and to more manageable proportions. One particular float that caused a sharp decline in float building was a large elaborate float that had an outhouse on the back containing a student with his pants around his ankles on the toilet. After several newspapers in the region declared SDSU students as "vulgar," the college shied away from obscene and large floats.

The parade is led by a notable alumni or dignitary selected as grand marshal by the Grand Pooba, who is the head of the Hobo Day Committee.

== Bummobile ==
The parade is ended by the Grand Pooba riding through on the historic Bummobile with the rest of the Hobo Day Committee. For seven decades, the Bummobile has led the Hobo Day Parade past the Campanile along Medary Avenue. Otherwise, with the exception of a select number of summer parades and SDSU events, the 1912 Ford Model T remains displayed in a large glass encasing in the Hobo Day Gallery, a Hobo Day showcase room in the SDSU University Student Union, built in 2010. The year of the Bummobile (1912) is significant because it marks the celebration of the first Hobo Day. The Bummobile has been the lead entry in every Hobo Day parade since 1938, with the exception of 1942, when Hobo Day and classes were canceled so students could help with the World War II effort. The Bummobile was donated in 1938 by Frank Weigel, a farmer from Flandreau, S.D. The Model T has shepherded homecoming grand poobas, parade grand marshals and U.S. president-elect, Dwight D. Eisenhower.

Former Grand Pooba Sara French said a series of problems has arisen in recent years. The Bummobile has started on fire; a tire has fallen off and the brakes have given out. The car had to be pushed through the parade route in 2006. That has prompted French and the Hobo Day Committee to launch an effort to repair and restore the Bummobile. In 2009, the Bummobile was shipped off to California for a whole year to be restored and repaired, and ever since it runs with minimal problems.5

== Hobo Day riot ==
In 1990, students and people in Brookings for the event grew agitated after a cold, damp week and created what came to be known at the Hobo Day Riots.

People poured from house parties and congregated at areas on and off campus. A bonfire was started and when a KSFY news vehicle from the Sioux Falls station arrived with a crew to cover the rowdy celebration, students went from jumping over the fire and showing off for the camera to rocking and eventually overturning the station wagon.

Parade barricades were burned, light poles and street signs damaged and an SDSU campus police car was vandalized. Nine men were eventually charged with offenses and Hobo Day's future was in question, according to university officials.

Large house parties were banned and the Hobo Day Committee apologized.

== Recent Hobo Day themes and Grand Poobas ==
- 2000 - Hobos in Camelot
- 2001 - Hobostock
- 2002 - Operation: Hobo Day
- 2003 - Traditions: Hobo Day
- 2004 - Hobos Under Construction
- 2005 - Luck of the Hobos
- 2006 - Hobos on the Prairie
- 2007 - 007 Hobos Never Die
- 2008 - Hobos get Physical
- 2009 - Hobos Save the Day
- 2010 - Peace, Love and Hobos
- 2011 - Night of the Living Hobos
- 2012 – 100 years of Hobo - Abby Settje Rogers
- 2013 - The Tradition Lives On - Casey Janisch
- 2014 - Never Stop Wandering - Scottie DesLauriers
- 2015 - Always an Adventure - Paul Dybedahl
- 2016 - Living the Legacy - Corey Chicoine
- 2017 - Homeward Bound - Anna Chicoine
- 2018 - Together in the Tradition - Miranda Mack
- 2019 - Wander On - Jeanette Klein
- 2020 - Rooted at the Rails - Kylee Donnelly
- 2021 - Adventure Awaits - Marie Robbins
- 2022 - The Timeless Tradition - Regen Wiederrich
- 2023 - All Rails Lead Home - Marissa Vogt
- 2024 - Called to Wander - Victoria Hansen
- 2025 - Chase the Horizon - Claire Koenecke

== Current Hobo Day events ==
The events throughout the week, named Hobo Week, are facilitated by South Dakota State University's Hobo Day Committee (HDC). One of 17 coordinators selected to be on the HDC is the Grand Pooba. The Grand Pooba is in charge of selecting and maintaining a committee of students to plan, promote, and execute Hobo Week and Hobo Day.

Hobo Gear Prep Night: Students are invited to buy donated clothes for cheap prices to turn into their Hobo Gear, or bring their clothes are buy patches, buttons, and accessories to amp up their outfits.

One Month Club: Males grow their beards out and females grow out their leg hair the month leading up to Hobo Day. Men's categories include longest, fullest, patchiest and best attempt. Women's categories include longest, softest and roughest.

Six Month Club: Males grow their beards out and females grow out their leg hair for SIX months leading up to Hobo Day (April–October).

Paint the Town: Various businesses in Brookings volunteer to have their windows painted, each team is assigned a window to paint and a winner is chosen based on creativity, theme, and school spirit.

Rally at the Rails: This glorified pep fest takes place in downtown Brookings and features a live band, food, dancing, games, and other entertainment for students and community members to kick off Hobo Week in style.

Bum-A-Meal: Students sign up to participate in a meal one evening of the Hobo week. When they arrive for the event, they are given an address and go to eat at a home in the Brookings community.

MrMs Homelycoming: This event allows the male population to compete in a beauty pageant dressed as girls and the female population to compete dressed as guys. Talent and interview are some of the judged categories.

BumOver: Students are provided with cardboard and duct tape and build a "shanty" resembling a home, iconic buildings, or whatever they imagine!

Cavorts Talent Show: The student talent show takes place the Friday night before Hobo Day. Cavorts, which often sells out in advance, is held in the Performing Arts Center (PAC). The acts performing go through an audition process much earlier in the semester and are selected to perform in the show by student leaders. Once chosen, the acts compete for cash prizes at the actual event. Popular faculty and staff are often chosen to judge acts based on various attributes. In 2010, an audience-voted Fan Favorite prize was introduced to accompany the traditional judge-voted first, second, and third place prizes.

Hobo Day 5k: The morning of Hobo Day, there is a 5k sponsored by the local running group, Prairie Striders.

Bumfire: Traditionally, the Thursday night before the game, but now usually on the Tuesday night, students flock out to the "Backyard" for a large bonfire. The local fire department has a large presence at this event! A concert often occurs before or after the bonfire.

Events that have been discontinued:

Hobolympics: Teams from various campus organizations and residence halls compete in a variety of "hobo" athletics.

Residence Hall Lobby Decorating: Each of the residence halls on campus decorate their lobby, usually in full glory.

== Hobo Day Gallery ==
The Bummobile is the inspiration for the Hobo Day Gallery located in the northwest corner of the Student Union.

The fully restored Bummobile is the centerpiece of the gallery which includes other Hobo Day memorabilia. The Hobo Day Committee helped develop the vision for the Hobo Day Gallery, which serves as a living gallery for students, alumni and visitors to reconnect and to share time-honored traditions of the past. The Class of 1958 took a leadership role in private fundraising for the project and an anonymous member of the Class of 1958 pledged $75,000 as a challenge match to spur donations.

In Fall 2011, a sculpture of Hobo Day icon Weary Wil with his ever-faithful dog, Spot, following him, was erected outside the north entrance to the University Student Union, near the glass windows showcasing the Bummobile in the Hobo Day Gallery. Following suit in 2013, a statue of Dirty Lil with her kitten Mittens was installed.
