= 1934 Georgetown Hoyas football team =

American college football season

1934 Georgetown Hoyas football
- Conference: Independent
- Record: 4–3–1
- Head coach: Jack Hagerty (3rd season)
- Captain: Joe Savarine
- Home stadium: Griffith Stadium

1934 Southern college football independents records
	Conf.			Overall
Team	W	L	T	W		L		T
Western Maryland		–		8	–	0	–	1
No. 7 Navy		–		8	–	1	–	0
Texas A&I		–		5	–	1	–	1
Troy State		–		7	–	2	–	0
Tulsa		–		5	–	2	–	1
George Washington		–		6	–	3	–	1
West Virginia		–		6	–	4	–	0
Oglethorpe		–		5	–	4	–	1
Delaware		–		4	–	3	–	1
Georgetown		–		4	–	3	–	1
Texas Mines		–		4	–	4	–	0
Catholic University		–		3	–	4	–	1
Jacksonville State		–		3	–	4	–	0
South Georgia Teachers		–		4	–	5	–	0
William & Mary Norfolk		–		2	–	4	–	2
Wake Forest		–		3	–	7	–	0
East Carolina		–		1	–	4	–	1
Oklahoma City		–		1	–	8	–	0
Dixie (TX)		–		0	–	7	–	0
Rankings from Associated Press

The 1934 Georgetown Hoyas football team was an American football team that represented Georgetown University as an independent during the 1934 college football season. In their third season under head coach Jack Hagerty, the Hoyas compiled a 4–3–1 record and outscored opponents by a total of 65 to 33. The team played its home games at Griffith Stadium in Washington, D.C.

== Schedule ==
Date	Time	Opponent	Site	Result	Attendance	Source
October 5		Mount St. Mary's	Griffith Stadium; Washington, DC	W 20–0		
October 13		at Manhattan	Ebbets Field; Brooklyn, NY	W 9–0	15,000	
October 20		William & Mary	Griffith Stadium; Washington, DC	W 3–0	5,000	
October 27		at NYU	Yankee Stadium; Bronx, NY	T 0–0	15,000	
November 3	2:30 p.m.	at Richmond	City Stadium; Richmond, VA	L 13–14	8,000	
November 10		Roanoke	Griffith Stadium; Washington, DC	W 20–0	3,000	
November 24		at Maryland	Byrd Stadium; College Park, MD	L 0–6		
December 1		vs. Western Maryland	Baltimore Stadium; Baltimore, MD	L 0–13		
All times are in Eastern time
