= 1934 Oglethorpe Stormy Petrels football team =

American college football season

1934 Oglethorpe Stormy Petrels football
- Conference: Independent
- Record: 5–4–1
- Head coach: John W. Patrick (1st season)
- Home stadium: Hermance Stadium; Ponce de Leon Park

1934 Southern college football independents records
	Conf.			Overall
Team	W	L	T	W		L		T
Western Maryland		–		8	–	0	–	1
No. 7 Navy		–		8	–	1	–	0
Texas A&I		–		5	–	1	–	1
Troy State		–		7	–	2	–	0
Tulsa		–		5	–	2	–	1
George Washington		–		6	–	3	–	1
West Virginia		–		6	–	4	–	0
Oglethorpe		–		5	–	4	–	1
Delaware		–		4	–	3	–	1
Georgetown		–		4	–	3	–	1
Texas Mines		–		4	–	4	–	0
Catholic University		–		3	–	4	–	1
Jacksonville State		–		3	–	4	–	0
South Georgia Teachers		–		4	–	5	–	0
William & Mary Norfolk		–		2	–	4	–	2
Wake Forest		–		3	–	7	–	0
East Carolina		–		1	–	4	–	1
Oklahoma City		–		1	–	8	–	0
Dixie (TX)		–		0	–	7	–	0
Rankings from Associated Press

The 1934 Oglethorpe Stormy Petrels football team was an American football team that represented Oglethorpe University as an independent during the 1934 college football season. In their first year under head coach John W. Patrick, the Stormy Petrels compiled a 5–4–1 record.

== Schedule ==
Date	Opponent	Site	Result	Attendance	Source
September 21	Newberry	Ponce de Leon Park; Atlanta, GA	W 12–0		
September 29	at Auburn	Drake Field; Auburn, AL	L 0–15	5,000	
October 6	vs. The Citadel	Augusta, GA	W 12–6		
October 13	at Chattanooga	Chamberlain Field; Chattanooga, TN	W 18–0		
October 20	Rollins	Ponce de Leon Park; Atlanta, GA	W 13–6	4,000	
October 27	Howard (AL)	Hermance Stadium; North Atlanta, GA	T 0–0		
November 2	vs. Erskine	Greenwood, SC	W 13–0	1,500	
November 10	at Catholic University	Brookland Stadium; Washington, DC	L 0–32		
November 16	at Miami (FL)	Moore Park; Miami, FL	L 6–19		
November 29	Mercer	Hermance Stadium; North Atlanta, GA	L 6–7	2,500	
