= 1934 Oklahoma City Goldbugs football team =

American college football season

1934 Oklahoma City Goldbugs football
- Conference: Independent
- Record: 1–8
- Head coach: Stan Williamson (1st season)
- Home stadium: Goldbug Field

1934 Southern college football independents records
	Conf.			Overall
Team	W	L	T	W		L		T
Western Maryland		–		8	–	0	–	1
No. 7 Navy		–		8	–	1	–	0
Texas A&I		–		5	–	1	–	1
Troy State		–		7	–	2	–	0
Tulsa		–		5	–	2	–	1
George Washington		–		6	–	3	–	1
West Virginia		–		6	–	4	–	0
Oglethorpe		–		5	–	4	–	1
Delaware		–		4	–	3	–	1
Georgetown		–		4	–	3	–	1
Texas Mines		–		4	–	4	–	0
Catholic University		–		3	–	4	–	1
Jacksonville State		–		3	–	4	–	0
South Georgia Teachers		–		4	–	5	–	0
William & Mary Norfolk		–		2	–	4	–	2
Wake Forest		–		3	–	7	–	0
East Carolina		–		1	–	4	–	1
Oklahoma City		–		1	–	8	–	0
Dixie (TX)		–		0	–	7	–	0
Rankings from Associated Press

The 1934 Oklahoma City Goldbugs football team represented Oklahoma City University as an independent during the 1934 college football season. In Stan Williamson's first and only season as head coach, the Goldbugs compiled a record of 1–8.

== Schedule ==
Date	Time	Opponent	Site	Result	Attendance	Source
September 20	8:00 p.m.	Southwestern Oklahoma State	Goldbug Field; Oklahoma City, OK	L 0–13		
September 29		Central State Teachers	Goldbug Field; Oklahoma City, OK	L 0–6	4,000	
October 5	8:00 p.m.	at Wichita	Wichita University Stadium; Wichita, KS	L 0–13	7,000	
October 12		Texas Tech	Goldbug Field; Oklahoma City, OK	L 0–20		
October 18		Emporia Teachers	Goldbug Field; Oklahoma City, OK	L 6–18		
November 2	8:00 p.m.	at Oklahoma Baptist	Hurt Field; Shawnee, OK	L 7–13		
November 9	8:00 p.m.	Arizona^{†}	Goldbug Field; Oklahoma City, OK	L 6–26		
November 16	8:00 p.m.	North Dakota Agricultural	Goldbug Field; Oklahoma City, OK	L 7–13		
November 29		Oklahoma A&M	Goldbug Field; Oklahoma City, OK	W 13–0	1,500	
^{†}Homecoming; All times are in Central time
