= 1934 Tulsa Golden Hurricane football team =

American college football season

1934 Tulsa Golden Hurricane football
- Conference: Independent
- Record: 5–2–1
- Head coach: Gus Henderson (10th season)
- Home stadium: Skelly Field

1934 Southern college football independents records
	Conf.			Overall
Team	W	L	T	W		L		T
Western Maryland		–		8	–	0	–	1
No. 7 Navy		–		8	–	1	–	0
Texas A&I		–		5	–	1	–	1
Troy State		–		7	–	2	–	0
Tulsa		–		5	–	2	–	1
George Washington		–		6	–	3	–	1
West Virginia		–		6	–	4	–	0
Oglethorpe		–		5	–	4	–	1
Delaware		–		4	–	3	–	1
Georgetown		–		4	–	3	–	1
Texas Mines		–		4	–	4	–	0
Catholic University		–		3	–	4	–	1
Jacksonville State		–		3	–	4	–	0
South Georgia Teachers		–		4	–	5	–	0
William & Mary Norfolk		–		2	–	4	–	2
Wake Forest		–		3	–	7	–	0
East Carolina		–		1	–	4	–	1
Oklahoma City		–		1	–	8	–	0
Dixie (TX)		–		0	–	7	–	0
Rankings from Associated Press

The 1934 Tulsa Golden Hurricane football team represented the University of Tulsa during the 1934 college football season. In their tenth year under head coach Gus Henderson, the Golden Hurricane compiled a 5–2–1 record. The team gave up an average of only 4.9 points per game, defeated Oklahoma A&M (19–0) and Kansas State (21–0), tied Arkansas (7–7), and lost to TCU (14–12) and George Washington (10–0).

== Schedule ==
Date	Time	Opponent	Site	Result	Attendance	Source
September 21	8:15 p.m.	Central State Teachers	Skelly Field; Tulsa, OK	W 26–0	9,000	
October 6		Kansas	Skelly Field; Tulsa, OK	W 7–0		
October 13		TCU	Skelly Field; Tulsa, OK	L 12–14	10,000	
October 19		at George Washington	Griffith Stadium; Washington, DC	L 0–10	20,000	
October 27		Kansas State^{†}	Skelly Field; Tulsa, OK	W 21–0		
November 10		Centenary	Skelly Field; Tulsa, OK	W 14–8	15,000	
November 17		Oklahoma A&M	Skelly Field; Tulsa, OK (rivalry)	W 19–0		
November 29		Arkansas	Skelly Field; Tulsa, OK	T 7–7	7,000	
^{†}Homecoming; All times are in Central time
