= 1934 Delaware Fightin' Blue Hens football team =

American college football season

1934 Delaware Fightin' Blue Hens football
- Conference: Independent
- Record: 4–3–1
- Head coach: Skip Stahley (1st season)
- Home stadium: Frazer Field

1934 Southern college football independents records
	Conf.			Overall
Team	W	L	T	W		L		T
Western Maryland		–		8	–	0	–	1
No. 7 Navy		–		8	–	1	–	0
Texas A&I		–		5	–	1	–	1
Troy State		–		7	–	2	–	0
Tulsa		–		5	–	2	–	1
George Washington		–		6	–	3	–	1
West Virginia		–		6	–	4	–	0
Oglethorpe		–		5	–	4	–	1
Delaware		–		4	–	3	–	1
Georgetown		–		4	–	3	–	1
Texas Mines		–		4	–	4	–	0
Catholic University		–		3	–	4	–	1
Jacksonville State		–		3	–	4	–	0
South Georgia Teachers		–		4	–	5	–	0
William & Mary Norfolk		–		2	–	4	–	2
Wake Forest		–		3	–	7	–	0
East Carolina		–		1	–	4	–	1
Oklahoma City		–		1	–	8	–	0
Dixie (TX)		–		0	–	7	–	0
Rankings from Associated Press

The 1934 Delaware Fightin' Blue Hens football team was an American football team that represented the University of Delaware in the 1934 college football season. In their first season under head coach Skip Stahley, the Blue Hens compiled a 4–3–1 record and were outscored by a total of 71 to 51. The team played its home games at Frazer Field in Newark, Delaware.

== Schedule ==
Date	Opponent	Site	Result	Attendance	Source
October 6	at Saint Joseph's	34th and City Line Field; Philadelphia, PA	W 16–0		
October 13	at Juniata	College Field; Huntingdon, PA	W 14–0		
October 20	Hampden–Sydney	Frazer Field; Newark, DE	T 0–0		
October 27	Lebanon Valley	Frazer Field; Newark, DE	L 0–24		
November 3	Dickinson	Frazer Field; Newark, DE	W 7–0		
November 10	vs. Pennsylvania Military	Municipal Auditorium; Atlantic City, NJ	L 0–12	15,000	
November 17	Drexel	Frazer Field; Newark, DE	W 7–6		
November 24	Washington College	Frazer Field; Newark, DE	L 7–29		
