= 1934 Texas Mines Miners football team =

American college football season

1934 Texas Mines Miners football
- Conference: Independent
- Record: 4–4
- Head coach: Mack Saxon (6th season)
- Home stadium: Kidd Field

1934 Southern college football independents records
	Conf.			Overall
Team	W	L	T	W		L		T
Western Maryland		–		8	–	0	–	1
No. 7 Navy		–		8	–	1	–	0
Texas A&I		–		5	–	1	–	1
Troy State		–		7	–	2	–	0
Tulsa		–		5	–	2	–	1
George Washington		–		6	–	3	–	1
West Virginia		–		6	–	4	–	0
Oglethorpe		–		5	–	4	–	1
Delaware		–		4	–	3	–	1
Georgetown		–		4	–	3	–	1
Texas Mines		–		4	–	4	–	0
Catholic University		–		3	–	4	–	1
Jacksonville State		–		3	–	4	–	0
South Georgia Teachers		–		4	–	5	–	0
William & Mary Norfolk		–		2	–	4	–	2
Wake Forest		–		3	–	7	–	0
East Carolina		–		1	–	4	–	1
Oklahoma City		–		1	–	8	–	0
Dixie (TX)		–		0	–	7	–	0
Rankings from Associated Press

The 1934 Texas Mines Miners football team, sometimes known as the "Muckers", was an American football team that represented Texas School of Mines (now known as the University of Texas at El Paso) as an independent during the 1934 college football season. In its sixth season under head coach Mack Saxon, the team compiled a 4–4 record and outscored opponents by a total of 132 to 104.

The school celebrated its 20th anniversary in 1934 and held a parade through El Paso in connection with the October 13 football game.

== Schedule ==
Date	Opponent	Site	Result	Attendance	Source
September 29	Daniel Baker	Kidd Field; El Paso, TX	W 34–7		
October 5	at West Texas State	Canyon, TX	L 6–20		
October 13	New Mexico^{†}	Kidd Field; El Paso, TX	L 15–21	3,500	
October 20	New Mexico Military	Kidd Field; El Paso, TX	W 24–0	< 1,000	
November 2	at Texas Tech	Tech Field; Lubbock, TX	L 0–27		
November 10	at Sul Ross	Alpine, TX	L 12–13		
November 17	Hardin–Simmons	Kidd Field; El Paso, TX	W 13–3	2,500	
November 29	St. Edward's	Kidd Field; El Paso, TX	W 27–13	3,500	
^{†}Homecoming
