= 1934 East Carolina Pirates football team =

American college football season

1934 East Carolina Pirates football
- Conference: Independent
- Record: 1–4–1
- Head coach: Doc Mathis (1st season)

1934 Southern college football independents records
	Conf.			Overall
Team	W	L	T	W		L		T
Western Maryland		–		8	–	0	–	1
No. 7 Navy		–		8	–	1	–	0
Texas A&I		–		5	–	1	–	1
Troy State		–		7	–	2	–	0
Tulsa		–		5	–	2	–	1
George Washington		–		6	–	3	–	1
West Virginia		–		6	–	4	–	0
Oglethorpe		–		5	–	4	–	1
Delaware		–		4	–	3	–	1
Georgetown		–		4	–	3	–	1
Texas Mines		–		4	–	4	–	0
Catholic University		–		3	–	4	–	1
Jacksonville State		–		3	–	4	–	0
South Georgia Teachers		–		4	–	5	–	0
William & Mary Norfolk		–		2	–	4	–	2
Wake Forest		–		3	–	7	–	0
East Carolina		–		1	–	4	–	1
Oklahoma City		–		1	–	8	–	0
Dixie (TX)		–		0	–	7	–	0
Rankings from Associated Press

The 1934 East Carolina Pirates football team was an American football team that represented East Carolina Teachers College (now known as East Carolina University) as an independent during the 1934 college football season. In their first season under head coach Doc Mathis, the team compiled a 1–4–1 record.

== Schedule ==
Date	Opponent	Site	Result	Source
October 13	Wingate	Greenville, NC	L 0–6	
October 20	at Appalachian State	College Field; Boone, NC	L 6–27	
November 3	at Presbyterian Junior College	Maxton, NC	W 6–0	
November 12	Louisburg	Greenville, NC	L 6–7	
November 16	William & Mary Norfolk Division	Greenville, NC	T 0–0	
November 23	at Lenoir Rhyne	Moretz Stadium; Hickory, NC	L 0–47	
