= 1934 George Washington Colonials football team =

American college football season

1934 George Washington Colonials football
- Conference: Independent
- Record: 6–3–1
- Head coach: Jim Pixlee (6th season)
- Home stadium: Griffith Stadium

1934 Southern college football independents records
	Conf.			Overall
Team	W	L	T	W		L		T
Western Maryland		–		8	–	0	–	1
No. 7 Navy		–		8	–	1	–	0
Texas A&I		–		5	–	1	–	1
Troy State		–		7	–	2	–	0
Tulsa		–		5	–	2	–	1
George Washington		–		6	–	3	–	1
West Virginia		–		6	–	4	–	0
Oglethorpe		–		5	–	4	–	1
Delaware		–		4	–	3	–	1
Georgetown		–		4	–	3	–	1
Texas Mines		–		4	–	4	–	0
Catholic University		–		3	–	4	–	1
Jacksonville State		–		3	–	4	–	0
South Georgia Teachers		–		4	–	5	–	0
William & Mary Norfolk		–		2	–	4	–	2
Wake Forest		–		3	–	7	–	0
East Carolina		–		1	–	4	–	1
Oklahoma City		–		1	–	8	–	0
Dixie (TX)		–		0	–	7	–	0
Rankings from Associated Press

The 1934 George Washington Colonials football team was an American football team that represented George Washington University as an independent during the 1934 college football season. In its sixth season under head coach Jim Pixlee, the team compiled a 6–3–1 record and outscored opponents by a total of 102 to 29. The team defeated Tulsa, Wake Forest, West Virginia, and Oklahoma, tied with Denver, and lost to North Dakota, Vanderbilt, and LSU.

== Schedule ==
Date	Opponent	Site	Result	Attendance	Source
September 29	Shepherd	Central H.S. Stadium; Washington, DC	W 41–0	7,000	
October 5	at Denver	DU Stadium; Denver, CO	T 0–0		
October 12	The Citadel	Griffith Stadium; Washington, DC	W 26–0		
October 19	Tulsa	Griffith Stadium; Washington, DC	W 10–0	20,000	
October 26	Wake Forest	Griffith Stadium; Washington, DC	W 6–2		
November 3	Vanderbilt	Griffith Stadium; Washington, DC	L 6–7	15,000	
November 10	LSU	Griffith Stadium; Washington, DC	L 0–6	20,000	
November 17	at West Virginia	Mountaineer Field; Morgantown, WV	W 10–7		
November 23	North Dakota	Griffith Stadium; Washington, DC	L 0–7		
November 29	Oklahoma	Griffith Stadium; Washington, DC	W 3–0		
