= 1934 Western Maryland Green Terror football team =

American college football season

1934 Western Maryland Green Terror football
- Conference: Independent
- Record: 8–0–1
- Head coach: Dick Harlow (9th season)
- Offensive scheme: Single-wing
- Captain: Bill Shepherd

1934 Southern college football independents records
	Conf.			Overall
Team	W	L	T	W		L		T
Western Maryland		–		8	–	0	–	1
No. 7 Navy		–		8	–	1	–	0
Texas A&I		–		5	–	1	–	1
Troy State		–		7	–	2	–	0
Tulsa		–		5	–	2	–	1
George Washington		–		6	–	3	–	1
West Virginia		–		6	–	4	–	0
Oglethorpe		–		5	–	4	–	1
Delaware		–		4	–	3	–	1
Georgetown		–		4	–	3	–	1
Texas Mines		–		4	–	4	–	0
Catholic University		–		3	–	4	–	1
Jacksonville State		–		3	–	4	–	0
South Georgia Teachers		–		4	–	5	–	0
William & Mary Norfolk		–		2	–	4	–	2
Wake Forest		–		3	–	7	–	0
East Carolina		–		1	–	4	–	1
Oklahoma City		–		1	–	8	–	0
Dixie (TX)		–		0	–	7	–	0
Rankings from Associated Press

The 1934 Western Maryland Green Terror football team was an American football team that represented Western Maryland College (now known as McDaniel College) as an independent during the 1934 college football season. In its ninth season under head coach Dick Harlow, the team compiled an undefeated 8–0–1 record and shut out eight of its nine opponents. Left halfback and team captain Bill Shepherd led the country with 133 points scored and went on to play six years in the NFL. Harlow was later inducted into the College Football Hall of Fame.

== Schedule ==
Date	Opponent	Site	Result	Attendance	Source
October 6	at Villanova	Villanova Stadium; Villanova, PA	T 0–0		
October 13	at Albright	Reading, PA	W 49–0		
October 20	vs. Boston College	Baltimore Stadium; Baltimore, MD	W 40–0	10,300	
October 27	at St. Thomas (PA)	Scranton, PA	W 20–0		
November 3	at Catholic University	Brookland Stadium; Washington, DC	W 2–0	15,000	
November 10	at West Chester	Wayne Field; West Chester, PA	W 35–12		
November 17	at Bucknell	Lewisburg, PA	W 6–0		
November 29	Mount St. Mary's^{†}	Westminster, MD	W 26–0		
December 1	vs. Georgetown	Baltimore Stadium; Baltimore, MD	W 13–0		
^{†}Homecoming
