= 1934 Cal Poly Mustangs football team =

American college football season

1934 Cal Poly Mustangs football
- Conference: Independent
- Record: 6–2
- Head coach: Howie O'Daniels (2nd season)

1934 Western college football independents records
	Conf.			Overall
Team	W	L	T	W		L		T
Hawaii		–		6	–	0	–	0
Gonzaga		–		8	–	2	–	1
Saint Mary's		–		7	–	2	–	0
Loyola (CA)		–		7	–	2	–	1
No. 11 Santa Clara		–		7	–	2	–	1
Cal Poly		–		6	–	2	–	0
San Francisco		–		3	–	3	–	1
San Francisco State		–		3	–	3	–	1
Pomona		–		2	–	5	–	1
Humboldt State		–		1	–	3	–	0
Columbia (OR)		–		1	–	6	–	1
Rankings from Associated Press

The 1934 Cal Poly Mustangs football team represented California Polytechnic School—now known as California Polytechnic State University, San Luis Obispo—as an independent during the 1934 college football season. Led by second-year head coach Howie O'Daniels, Cal Poly compiled a record of 6–2. The team outscored its opponents 115 to 14 for the season. The Mustangs played home games in San Luis Obispo, California.

Cal Poly was a two-year school until 1941 and competed as an independent from 1929 to 1945.

== Schedule ==
Date	Opponent	Site	Result	Source
September 22	Visalia Junior College	San Luis Obispo, CA	W 27–0	
September 29	at Bakersfield	Bakersfield, CA	W 3–0	
October 6	at Santa Maria	San Luis Obispo, CA	W 6–0	
October 20	Fresno State freshmen	San Luis Obispo, CA	W 13–0	
October 26	at Santa Barbara State freshmen	Santa Barbara, CA	L 6–7	
October 27	at Salinas	Salinas, CA	W 1–0 (forfeit win)	
November 10	Moran Junior College (Note: Moran Junior College was founded in 1914 in Bainbridge Island, Washington. A satellite campus was opened in 1928 in Atascadero, California. Records show that the California site fielded football teams from 1929 to 1935. The Washington campus closed in 1935 and the California campus closed shortly thereafter.)	San Luis Obispo, CA	W 31–0	
November 12	Saint Mary's Gaels freshmen	San Luis Obispo, CA	L 0–7	
