= 1934 Fresno State Bulldogs football team =

American college football season

1934 Fresno State Bulldogs football

FWC co-champion
- Conference: Far Western Conference
- Record: 7–2–1 (3–0–1 FWC)
- Head coach: Leo Harris (2nd season)
- Home stadium: Fresno State College Stadium

1934 Far Western Conference football standings
	Conf.					Overall
Team	W		L		T	W		L		T
Fresno State +	3	–	0	–	1	7	–	2	–	1
San Jose State +	2	–	0	–	3	3	–	3	–	4
Chico State	2	–	1	–	1	4	–	3	–	1
Pacific (CA)	2	–	2	–	0	4	–	5	–	0
Cal Aggies	0	–	2	–	2	0	–	5	–	3
Nevada	0	–	4	–	1	1	–	7	–	1
+ – Conference co-champions

The 1934 Fresno State Bulldogs football team represented Fresno State Normal School—now known as California State University, Fresno—during the 1934 college football season.

Fresno State competed in the Far Western Conference (FWC). (Note: The Northern California Athletic Conference (NCAC) was known as the Far Western Conference (FWC) from its founding in 1925 to 1982.) The 1934 team was led by second-year head coach Leo Harris and played home games at Fresno State College Stadium (Note: Ratcliffe Stadium was known as Fresno State College Stadium from 1926 to 1940.) on the campus of Fresno City College in Fresno, California. They finished the season as co-champion of the FWC, with a record of seven wins, two losses and one tie (7–2–1, 3–0–1 FWC). The Bulldogs outscored their opponents 225–77 for the season, including holding their opponents under 10 points in six of the ten games.

== Schedule ==
Date	Opponent	Site	Result	Attendance	Source
September 22	San Francisco State*	Fresno State College Stadium; Fresno, CA	W 33–6	2,099	
September 29	USC JV*	Fresno State College Stadium; Fresno, CA	W 7–0	2,574	
October 6	California JV*	Fresno State College Stadium; Fresno, CA	L 6–12	1,416	
October 13	at Arizona State–Flagstaff*	Skidmore Field; Flagstaff, AZ	W 26–14		
October 19	at Pacific (CA)	Baxter Stadium; Stockton, CA	W 7–6	9,000	
October 27	Santa Clara*	Fresno State College Stadium; Fresno, CA	L 0–19	10,000	
November 3	at San Jose State	Spartan Stadium; San Jose, CA (rivalry)	T 7–7	7,182	
November 12	Cal Aggies	Fresno State College Stadium; Fresno, CA	W 40–13	5,723	
November 17	Caltech*	Fresno State College Stadium; Fresno, CA	W 66–0	379	
November 29	Nevada	Fresno State College Stadium; Fresno, CA	W 33–0	5,754	
*Non-conference game
