= 1934 UCLA Bruins football team =

American college football season

1934 UCLA Bruins football
- Conference: Pacific Coast Conference
- Record: 7–3 (2–3 PCC)
- Head coach: William H. Spaulding (10th season)
- Home stadium: Los Angeles Memorial Coliseum; Spaulding Field

1934 Pacific Coast Conference football standings
	Conf.					Overall
Team	W		L		T	W		L		T
No. 2 Stanford $	5	–	0	–	0	9	–	1	–	1
Washington State	4	–	0	–	1	4	–	3	–	1
Washington	5	–	1	–	1	6	–	1	–	1
Oregon	4	–	2	–	0	6	–	4	–	0
California	3	–	2	–	0	6	–	6	–	0
UCLA	2	–	3	–	0	7	–	3	–	0
USC	1	–	4	–	1	4	–	6	–	1
Idaho	1	–	4	–	0	3	–	5	–	0
Oregon State	0	–	5	–	2	3	–	6	–	2
Montana	0	–	4	–	1	2	–	5	–	1
$ – Conference champion; Rankings from Associated Press

The 1934 UCLA Bruins football team was an American football team that represented the University of California, Los Angeles (UCLA) during the 1934 college football season. In their 10th year under head coach William H. Spaulding, the Bruins compiled a 7–3 record (2–3 conference) and finished in sixth place in the Pacific Coast Conference (PCC). Their standing was a minor improvement on the previous season's result when they ended in eighth place.

== Schedule ==
Date	Opponent	Site	Result	Attendance	Source
September 22 (Note: Doubleheader)	Pomona*	Spaulding Field; Los Angeles, CA	W 14–0	7,000	
September 22	San Diego State*	Spaulding Field; Los Angeles, CA	W 20–0	7,000	
September 29	at Oregon	Multnomah Stadium; Portland, OR	L 3–26	15,000	
October 13	Montana	Los Angeles Memorial Coliseum; Los Angeles, CA	W 16–0	20,000	
October 20	at California	California Memorial Stadium; Berkeley, CA (rivalry)	L 0–3	30,000	
October 27	Cal Aggies*	Los Angeles Memorial Coliseum; Los Angeles, CA	W 49–0	4,000	
November 3	Stanford	Los Angeles Memorial Coliseum; Los Angeles, CA	L 0–27	50,000	
November 12	Saint Mary's*	Los Angeles Memorial Coliseum; Los Angeles, CA	W 6–0	35,000	
November 24	Oregon State	Los Angeles Memorial Coliseum; Los Angeles, CA	W 25–7	15,000	
November 29	Loyola (CA)*	Los Angeles Memorial Coliseum; Los Angeles, CA	W 13–6	30,000	
*Non-conference game; Source:

== Roster ==
The following is a partial list of student-athletes on UCLA's football roster during the 1934 season.

- Robert Allington
- Edward Austin
- Robert Barr
- Verdi Boyer
- Sherman Chavoor
- Chuck Cheshire
- Joe Denis, Joe 1934
- George Dickerson
- Mike Frankovich
- Fred Funk
- Sigfried Funke
- Richard Gary
- Howard Haradon
- John Hastings
- R. F. Key
- Ransom Livesay
- Sinclair Lott
- Bob McChesney
- Lawrence McConnell
- William Murphy
- Remington Olmstead
- Carl Olson
- Charles Pike
- Ben Ross
- Robert Schroeder
- Julian Smith
- William Spaulding
- Sam Stawisky
- Sam Storey
- Harry Trotter
- Walter Wilton
- Wendell Womble
