= 1934 Chico State Wildcats football team =

American college football season

1934 Chico State Wildcats football
- Conference: Far Western Conference
- Record: 4–3–1 (2–1–1 FWC)
- Head coach: Art Acker (12th season)
- Home stadium: College Field

1934 Far Western Conference football standings
	Conf.					Overall
Team	W		L		T	W		L		T
Fresno State +	3	–	0	–	1	7	–	2	–	1
San Jose State +	2	–	0	–	3	3	–	3	–	4
Chico State	2	–	1	–	1	4	–	3	–	1
Pacific (CA)	2	–	2	–	0	4	–	5	–	0
Cal Aggies	0	–	2	–	2	0	–	5	–	3
Nevada	0	–	4	–	1	1	–	7	–	1
+ – Conference co-champions

The 1934 Chico State Wildcats football team represented Chico State Teachers College—now known as California State University, Chico—as a member of the Far Western Conference (FWC) during the 1934 college football season. Led by 12th-year head coach Art Acker, Chico State compiled an overall record of 4–3–1 with a mark of 2–1–1 in conference play, placing third in the FWC. The team outscored its opponents 73 to 40 for the season. The Wildcats played home games at College Field in Chico, California.

== Schedule ==
Date	Time	Opponent	Site	Result	Attendance	Source
September 29		Menlo*	College Field; Chico, CA	W 7–0		
October 6	8:00 p.m.	at Sacramento*	Sacramento Stadium; Sacramento, CA	L 6–12		
October 13		at San Jose State	Spartan Stadium; San Jose, CA	T 6–6	5,000	
October 27		San Francisco State*	College Field; Chico, CA	W 33–0		
November 3		Cal Aggies	College Field; Chico, CA	W 6–3		
November 10		at Southern Oregon Normal*	Ashland High School; Ashland, OR	L 0–6		
November 17		at Nevada	Mackay Stadium (Note: This stadium is the predecessor to the current Mackay Stadium, which was opened for the 1966 season.); Reno, NV	W 9–6	2,000	
November 29		Pacific (CA)	College Field; Chico, CA	L 6–7		
*Non-conference game; All times are in Pacific time
