= 1934 Whittier Poets football team =

American college football season

1934 Whittier Poets football

SCC champion
- Conference: Southern California Conference
- Record: 7–2–1 (5–0 SCC)
- Head coach: Wallace Newman (6th season)
- Home stadium: Hadley Field

1934 Southern California Conference football standings
| | Conf. | | | | | Overall |
| Team | W | | L | | T | W | | L | | T |
|---|---|---|---|---|---|---|---|---|---|---|
| Whittier $ | 5 | – | 0 | – | 0 | 7 | – | 2 | – | 1 |
| San Diego State | 2 | – | 1 | – | 1 | 3 | – | 5 | – | 1 |
| Occidental | 2 | – | 2 | – | 0 | 3 | – | 5 | – | 1 |
| Redlands | 2 | – | 3 | – | 0 | 3 | – | 4 | – | 1 |
| La Verne | 1 | – | 2 | – | 1 | 4 | – | 3 | – | 1 |
| Santa Barbara State | 0 | – | 4 | – | 0 | 2 | – | 5 | – | 1 |
$ – Conference champion

The 1934 Whittier Poets football team was an American football team that represented Whittier College in the Southern California Conference (SCC) during the 1934 college football season. In its sixth season under head coach Wallace Newman, the team compiled a 7–2–1 record (5–0 against conference opponents), won the SCC championship, and outscored opponents by a total of 204 to 81. Its only two losses were on opening day against defending national champion USC and three weeks later against Arizona. The team played its home games at Hadley Field in Whittier, California.

== Schedule ==
| Date | Opponent | Site | Result | Attendance | Source |
|---|---|---|---|---|---|
| September 22 | at USC* | Los Angeles Memorial Coliseum; Los Angeles, CA | L 14–30 | 30,000 | |
| September 29 | at Arizona State–Flagstaff* | Skidmore Field; Flagstaff, AZ | W 7–6 | | |
| October 6 | at La Verne | Arnett Field; La Verne, CA | W 27–7 | | |
| October 12 | Arizona* | Hadley Field; Whittier, CA | L 7–14 | | |
| October 20 | at Occidental | W.C. Patterson Field; Los Angeles, CA (rivalry) | W 12–0 | 4,000 | |
| October 27 | Santa Barbara State | Hadley Field; Whittier, CA | W 35–6 | | |
| November 3 | at San Diego State | Balboa Stadium; San Diego, CA | W 26–6 | 5,500 | |
| November 10 | Pomona*^{†} | Hadley Field; Whittier, CA | W 50–6 | 4,000 | |
| November 24 | Redlands | Hadley Field; Whittier, CA | W 20–0 | | |
| November 29 | San Jose State* | Hadley Field; Whittier, CA | T 6–6 | 7,500 | |
*Non-conference game; ^{†}Homecoming
