= 1934 Washington State Cougars football team =

American college football season

1934 Washington State Cougars football
- Conference: Pacific Coast Conference
- Record: 4–3–1 (4–0–1 PCC)
- Head coach: Babe Hollingbery (9th season)
- Captain: George Theodoratos
- Home stadium: Rogers Field

1934 Pacific Coast Conference football standings
	Conf.					Overall
Team	W		L		T	W		L		T
No. 2 Stanford $	5	–	0	–	0	9	–	1	–	1
Washington State	4	–	0	–	1	4	–	3	–	1
Washington	5	–	1	–	1	6	–	1	–	1
Oregon	4	–	2	–	0	6	–	4	–	0
California	3	–	2	–	0	6	–	6	–	0
UCLA	2	–	3	–	0	7	–	3	–	0
USC	1	–	4	–	1	4	–	6	–	1
Idaho	1	–	4	–	0	3	–	5	–	0
Oregon State	0	–	5	–	2	3	–	6	–	2
Montana	0	–	4	–	1	2	–	5	–	1
$ – Conference champion; Rankings from Associated Press

The 1934 Washington State Cougars football team was an American football team that represented Washington State College during the 1934 college football season. Ninth-year head coach Babe Hollingbery led the team to a 4–0–1 mark in the PCC and 4–3–1 overall.

The Cougars played their three home games on campus at Rogers Field in Pullman, Washington; a road game was played in Spokane at Gonzaga.

== Schedule ==
Date	Opponent	Site	Result	Attendance	Source
September 29	Montana	Rogers Field; Pullman, WA	W 27–0	7,000	
October 6	at USC	Los Angeles Memorial Coliseum; Los Angeles, CA	W 19–0	50,000	
October 13	at Gonzaga*	Gonzaga Stadium; Spokane, WA	L 6–13	11,000	
October 27	Oregon State	Rogers Field; Pullman, WA	W 31–0	13,000	
November 2	at Saint Mary's*	Kezar Stadium; San Francisco, CA	L 6–13	20,000	
November 10	Idaho	Rogers Field; Pullman, WA (rivalry)	W 19–0	11,000	
November 24	at Washington	Husky Stadium; Seattle, WA (rivalry)	T 0–0	38,000	
December 1	at Detroit*	University of Detroit Stadium; Detroit, MI	L 0–6	5,000	
*Non-conference game; Source:
