= 1934 Montana Grizzlies football team =

American college football season

1934 Montana Grizzlies football
- Conference: Pacific Coast Conference
- Record: 2–5–1 (0–4–1 PCC)
- Head coach: Bunny Oakes (4th season)
- Home stadium: Dornblaser Field

1934 Pacific Coast Conference football standings
	Conf.					Overall
Team	W		L		T	W		L		T
No. 2 Stanford $	5	–	0	–	0	9	–	1	–	1
Washington State	4	–	0	–	1	4	–	3	–	1
Washington	5	–	1	–	1	6	–	1	–	1
Oregon	4	–	2	–	0	6	–	4	–	0
California	3	–	2	–	0	6	–	6	–	0
UCLA	2	–	3	–	0	7	–	3	–	0
USC	1	–	4	–	1	4	–	6	–	1
Idaho	1	–	4	–	0	3	–	5	–	0
Oregon State	0	–	5	–	2	3	–	6	–	2
Montana	0	–	4	–	1	2	–	5	–	1
$ – Conference champion; Rankings from Associated Press

The 1934 Montana Grizzlies football team represented the University of Montana in the 1934 college football season as a member of the Pacific Coast Conference (PCC). The Grizzlies were led by fourth-year head coach Bunny Oakes, played their home games at Dornblaser Field and finished the season with a record of two wins, five losses and one tie (2–5–1, 0–4–1 PCC).

== Schedule ==
Date	Opponent	Site	Result	Attendance	Source
September 29	at Washington State	Rogers Field; Pullman, WA	L 0–27	7,000	
October 13	at UCLA	Los Angeles Memorial Coliseum; Los Angeles, CA	L 0–16	20,000	
October 20	Montana Mines*	Dornblaser Field; Missoula, MT	W 48–0		
October 27	Idaho	Dornblaser Field; Missoula, MT (rivalry)	L 6–13		
November 3	at Oregon	Hayward Field; Eugene, OR	L 0–13		
November 10	vs. Montana State*	Clark Park; Butte, MT (rivalry)	W 25–0	6,500	
November 17	at Oregon State	Bell Field; Corvallis, OR	T 7–7	3,500	
November 29	Gonzaga*	Dornblaser Field; Missoula, MT	L 4–6	> 3,000	
*Non-conference game; Source:
