= 1934 Saint Mary's Gaels football team =

American college football season

1934 Saint Mary's Gaels football
- Conference: Independent
- Record: 7–2
- Head coach: Slip Madigan (14th season)
- Home stadium: Kezar Stadium

1934 Western college football independents records
	Conf.			Overall
Team	W	L	T	W		L		T
Hawaii		–		6	–	0	–	0
Gonzaga		–		8	–	2	–	1
Saint Mary's		–		7	–	2	–	0
Loyola (CA)		–		7	–	2	–	1
No. 11 Santa Clara		–		7	–	2	–	1
Cal Poly		–		6	–	2	–	0
San Francisco		–		3	–	3	–	1
San Francisco State		–		3	–	3	–	1
Pomona		–		2	–	5	–	1
Humboldt State		–		1	–	3	–	0
Columbia (OR)		–		1	–	6	–	1
Rankings from Associated Press

The 1934 Saint Mary's Gaels football team was an American football team that represented Saint Mary's College of California during the 1934 college football season. In their 14th season under head coach Slip Madigan, the Gaels compiled a 7–2 record and outscored their opponents by a combined total of 125 to 40. The Gaels' victories included a 7–0 besting of California, a 14–9 victory over Fordham, a 9–6 victory over Washington State, and a 13–7 victory over Oregon. The lone setbacks were losses to Nevada (7-9) and UCLA (0-6).

Two Gaels received honors on the 1934 All-Pacific Coast football team: end Ed Erdelatz (AP-2, UP-2); and tackle John Yezerski (UP-2).

== Schedule ==
Date	Opponent	Site	Result	Attendance	Source
September 30	Columbia (OR)	Kezar Stadium; San Francisco, CA	W 61–0	10,000	
October 6	at California	California Memorial Stadium; Berkeley, CA	W 7–0	65,000	
October 12	Nevada	Kezar Stadium; San Francisco, CA	L 7–9	25,000	
October 20	at Fordham	Polo Grounds; New York, NY	W 14–9	60,000	
November 2	Washington State	Kezar Stadium; San Francisco, CA	W 9–6	20,000	
November 12	at UCLA	Los Angeles Memorial Coliseum; Los Angeles, CA	L 0–6	35,000	
November 18	Santa Clara	Kezar Stadium; San Francisco, CA	W 7–0	60,000	
November 29	Oregon	Kezar Stadium; San Francisco, CA (Governors' Trophy Game)	W 13–7	14,000	
December 9	San Francisco	Kezar Stadium; San Francisco, CA	W 7–3	45,000	
