= 1934 Oregon State Beavers football team =

American college football season

1934 Oregon State Beavers football
- Conference: Pacific Coast Conference
- Record: 3–6–2 (0–5–2 PCC)
- Head coach: Lon Stiner (2nd season)
- Home stadium: Bell Field

1934 Pacific Coast Conference football standings
	Conf.					Overall
Team	W		L		T	W		L		T
No. 2 Stanford $	5	–	0	–	0	9	–	1	–	1
Washington State	4	–	0	–	1	4	–	3	–	1
Washington	5	–	1	–	1	6	–	1	–	1
Oregon	4	–	2	–	0	6	–	4	–	0
California	3	–	2	–	0	6	–	6	–	0
UCLA	2	–	3	–	0	7	–	3	–	0
USC	1	–	4	–	1	4	–	6	–	1
Idaho	1	–	4	–	0	3	–	5	–	0
Oregon State	0	–	5	–	2	3	–	6	–	2
Montana	0	–	4	–	1	2	–	5	–	1
$ – Conference champion; Rankings from Associated Press

The 1934 Oregon State Beavers football team represented Oregon State College in the Pacific Coast Conference (PCC) during the 1934 college football season. In their second season under head coach Lon Stiner, the Beavers compiled a 3–6–2 record (0–5–2 against PCC opponents), finished in ninth place in the PCC, and were outscored by their opponents, 131 to 104.

The team played its home games at Bell Field in Corvallis, Oregon and Multnomah Stadium in Portland.

The OSC squad finished the 1934 season with a national ranking of #119.

== Schedule ==
Date	Opponent	Site	Result	Attendance	Source
September 22	Willamette*	Bell Field; Corvallis, OR	W 13–0		
September 22	Pacific (OR)*	Bell Field; Corvallis, OR	W 19–0		
September 28	San Francisco*	Bell Field; Corvallis, OR	L 0–10		
October 6	Stanford	Multnomah Stadium; Portland, OR	L 0–17	12,000	
October 12	Columbia (OR)*	Bell Field; Corvallis, OR	W 39–12		
October 20	at USC	Los Angeles Memorial Coliseum; Los Angeles, CA	T 6–6	40,000	
October 27	at Washington State	Rogers Field; Pullman, WA	L 0–31	13,000	
November 3	at Washington	Husky Stadium; Seattle, WA	L 7–14	12,000	
November 10	vs. Oregon	Multnomah Stadium; Portland, OR (rivalry)	L 6–9	22,000	
November 17	Montana^{†}	Bell Field; Corvallis, OR	T 7–7	3,500	
November 24	at UCLA	Los Angeles Memorial Coliseum; Los Angeles, CA	L 7–25	15,000	
*Non-conference game; ^{†}Homecoming

== Roster ==
- HB Joe Gray, Fr.
