= 1934 Santa Barbara State Roadrunners football team =

American college football season

1934 Santa Barbara State Roadrunners football
- Conference: Southern California Conference
- Record: 2–5–1 (0–4 SCC)
- Head coach: Spud Harder (1st season)
- Home stadium: Peabody Stadium

1934 Southern California Conference football standings
	Conf.					Overall
Team	W		L		T	W		L		T
Whittier $	5	–	0	–	0	7	–	2	–	1
San Diego State	2	–	1	–	1	3	–	5	–	1
Occidental	2	–	2	–	0	3	–	5	–	1
Redlands	2	–	3	–	0	3	–	4	–	1
La Verne	1	–	2	–	1	4	–	3	–	1
Santa Barbara State	0	–	4	–	0	2	–	5	–	1
$ – Conference champion

The 1934 Santa Barbara State Roadrunners football team represented Santa Barbara State (Note: University of California, Santa Barbara was known as Santa Barbara State College from 1921 to 1943.) during the 1934 college football season.

Santa Barbara State competed in the Southern California Conference (SCC). The Roadrunners were led by first-year head coach Theodore "Spud" Harder and played home games at Peabody Stadium in Santa Barbara, California. They finished the season with a record of two wins, five losses and one tie (2–5–1, 0–4 SCIAC). Overall, the team was outscored by its opponents 31–91 for the season. The Roadrunners were shutout four times, and failed to score more than a touchdown in 7 of the 8 games.

== Schedule ==
Date	Opponent	Site	Result
September 22	Santa Barbara Athletic Club*	Peabody Stadium; Santa Barbara, CA	L 0–6
September 28	Pomona*	Peabody Stadium; Santa Barbara, CA	W 6–0
October 13	USC JV*	Peabody Stadium; Santa Barbara, CA	T 0–0
October 19	Redlands	Peabody Stadium; Santa Barbara, CA	L 0–18
October 27	at Whittier	Hadley Field; Whittier, CA	L 6–35
November 3	Occidental	Peabody Stadium; Santa Barbara, CA	L 6–12
November 17	at La Verne	La Verne, CA	L 0–20
November 24	Caltech*	Peabody Stadium; Santa Barbara, CA	W 13–0
*Non-conference game
