= Howie O'Daniels =

American football, basketball, and baseball coach

Biographical details
- Born: December 19, 1907; Seattle, Washington, U.S.
- Died: January 23, 1991 (aged 83); San Luis Obispo, California, U.S.

Playing career

Football
- 1928–1930: Santa Clara
- Position: Tackle

Coaching career (HC unless noted)

Football
- 1931–1932: Mission HS (CA)
- 1933–1941: Cal Poly
- 1946–1947: Cal Poly

Basketball
- 1941–1942: Cal Poly

Baseball
- 1942: Cal Poly
- 1956–1957: Cal Poly

Administrative career (AD unless noted)
- 1931–1933: Mission HS (CA)
- 1933–1948: Cal Poly

Head coaching record
- Overall: 56–33–6 (college football); 5–17 (college basketball); 34–37–1 (college baseball)

Howard R. O'Daniels (December 19, 1907 – January 23, 1991) was an American football, basketball, and baseball coach and college athletics administrator. He served as the head football (1933–1941, 1946–1947), men's basketball (1941–1942), and baseball (1942, 1956–1957) coach at California Polytechnic School—now known as California Polytechnic State University, San Luis Obispo.

O'Daniels was born on December 19, 1907, in Seattle. He played college football at Santa Clara University in the late 1920s. O'Daniels died on January 23, 1991, at a hospital in San Luis Obispo, California.

== Head coaching record ==
=== College football ===
Year	Team	Overall	Conference	Standing	Bowl/playoffs
Cal Poly Mustangs (Independent) (1933–1941)
1933	Cal Poly	7–0			
1934	Cal Poly	6–2			
1935	Cal Poly	5–2–1			
1936	Cal Poly	5–4			
1937	Cal Poly	4–2–2			
1938	Cal Poly	7–2			
1939	Cal Poly	4–4–1			
1940	Cal Poly	6–3			
1941	Cal Poly	5–3–1			
Cal Poly Mustangs (Independent) (1946)
1946	Cal Poly	6–2–1			
Cal Poly Mustangs (California Collegiate Athletic Association) (1947)
1947	Cal Poly	1–9	0–5	6th	
Cal Poly:		56–33–6	0–5		
Total:		56–33–6			
