= 1934 San Diego State Aztecs football team =

American college football season

1934 San Diego State Aztecs football
- Conference: Southern California Conference
- Record: 3–5–1 (2–1–1 SCC)
- Head coach: Walter Herreid (5th season)
- Home stadium: Balboa Stadium; Aztec Field; Navy "Sports" Field

1934 Southern California Conference football standings
| | Conf. | | | | | Overall |
| Team | W | | L | | T | W | | L | | T |
|---|---|---|---|---|---|---|---|---|---|---|
| Whittier $ | 5 | – | 0 | – | 0 | 7 | – | 2 | – | 1 |
| San Diego State | 2 | – | 1 | – | 1 | 3 | – | 5 | – | 1 |
| Occidental | 2 | – | 2 | – | 0 | 3 | – | 5 | – | 1 |
| Redlands | 2 | – | 3 | – | 0 | 3 | – | 4 | – | 1 |
| La Verne | 1 | – | 2 | – | 1 | 4 | – | 3 | – | 1 |
| Santa Barbara State | 0 | – | 4 | – | 0 | 2 | – | 5 | – | 1 |
$ – Conference champion

The 1934 San Diego State Aztecs football team represented San Diego State Teachers College (Note: San Diego State University was known as San Diego State Teachers College from 1924 to 1934.) during the 1934 college football season.

San Diego State competed in the Southern California Conference (SCC). The 1934 San Diego State team was led by head coach Walter Herreid in his fifth season with the Aztecs. They played home games at three San Diego sites: four games at Balboa Stadium, one game at Navy "Sports" Field, (Note: Navy "Sports" Field was the original name of what became Lane Field in downtown San Diego. It was converted to a baseball-only configuration in 1936.) and one game on campus. The Aztecs finished the season with three wins, five losses and one tie (3–5–1, 2–1–1 SCIAC). Overall, the team was outscored by its opponents 61–106 points for the season.

== Schedule ==
| Date | Opponent | Site | Result | Attendance | Source |
|---|---|---|---|---|---|
| September 22 | at UCLA* | Spaulding Field; Los Angeles, CA | L 0–20 | 7,000 | |
| September 28 | at Arizona* | Arizona Stadium; Tucson, AZ | L 0–7 | 6,000 | |
| October 6 | Army-Navy Academy (CA)* | Aztec Field; San Diego, CA | W 19–7 | 3,500 | |
| October 13 | Occidental | Balboa Stadium; San Diego, CA | W 20–7 | 5,500 | |
| October 19 | La Verne | Navy "Sports" Field; San Diego, CA | T 0–0 | 3,500 | |
| November 3 | Whittier | Balboa Stadium; San Diego, CA | L 6–26 | 5,500 | |
| November 10 | Loyola (CA)* | Balboa Stadium; San Diego, CA | L 3–19 | 3,500 | |
| November 17 | at Redlands | Redlands Stadium (Note: This stadium is the predecessor to the current Ted Runner Stadium on the University of Redlands campus, which was opened for the 1968 season); Redlands, CA | W 7–6 | 2,500 | |
| November 29 | Arizona State* | Balboa Stadium; San Diego, CA | L 6–14 | 4,000 | |
*Non-conference game
