= 1934 San Francisco State Golden Gaters football team =

American college football season

1934 San Francisco State Golden Gaters football
- Conference: Independent
- Record: 3–3–1
- Head coach: Dave Cox (4th season)
- Home stadium: Ewing Field

1934 Western college football independents records
	Conf.			Overall
Team	W	L	T	W		L		T
Hawaii		–		6	–	0	–	0
Gonzaga		–		8	–	2	–	1
Saint Mary's		–		7	–	2	–	0
Loyola (CA)		–		7	–	2	–	1
No. 11 Santa Clara		–		7	–	2	–	1
Cal Poly		–		6	–	2	–	0
San Francisco		–		3	–	3	–	1
San Francisco State		–		3	–	3	–	1
Pomona		–		2	–	5	–	1
Humboldt State		–		1	–	3	–	0
Columbia (OR)		–		1	–	6	–	1
Rankings from Associated Press

The 1934 San Francisco State Golden Gaters football team represented San Francisco State Teachers College—now known as San Francisco State University—as an independent during the 1934 college football season. Led by Dave Cox his fourth and final season as head coach, San Francisco State compiled a record of 3–3–1 and was outscored by its opponents 82 to 49. The Golden Gaters were shut out in four games. The team played home games at Ewing Field in San Francisco. Although the "Gator" was voted to be the mascot for the team in 1931, local newspaper articles called the team the "Golden Gaters".

== Schedule ==
Date	Opponent	Site	Result	Attendance	Source
September 1	Mare Island Marines	Kezar Stadium; San Francisco, CA	W 14–2		
September 8	at San Mateo	Burlingame High School; Burlingame, CA	L 0–6		
September 15	Marin	Ewing Field; San Francisco, CA	T 0–0		
September 22	at Fresno State	Fresno State College Stadium; Fresno, CA	L 0–34	2,099	
October 12	at Santa Rosa	Bailey Field; Santa Rosa, CA	W 13–0	1,500	
October 20	Humboldt State	Ewing Field; San Francisco, CA	W 22–7		
October 27	at Chico State	College Field; Chico, CA	L 0–33		
