= 1934 Hawaii Rainbows football team =

American college football season

1934 Hawaii Rainbows football
- Conference: Independent
- Record: 6–0
- Head coach: Otto Klum (14th season)
- Home stadium: Honolulu Stadium

1934 Western college football independents records
	Conf.			Overall
Team	W	L	T	W		L		T
Hawaii		–		6	–	0	–	0
Gonzaga		–		8	–	2	–	1
Saint Mary's		–		7	–	2	–	0
Loyola (CA)		–		7	–	2	–	1
No. 11 Santa Clara		–		7	–	2	–	1
Cal Poly		–		6	–	2	–	0
San Francisco		–		3	–	3	–	1
San Francisco State		–		3	–	3	–	1
Pomona		–		2	–	5	–	1
Humboldt State		–		1	–	3	–	0
Columbia (OR)		–		1	–	6	–	1
Rankings from Associated Press

The 1934 Hawaii Rainbows football team, sometimes known as the Deans, was an American football team that represented the University of Hawaii as an independent during the 1934 college football season. In their 14th season under head coach Otto "Proc" Klum, the Rainbows compiled a perfect 6–0 record, shut out four of six opponents, and outscored all opponents by a total of 142 to 21. The team concluded its season in the New Year's Day Classic bowl game, defeating California by a 14–0 score.

Tom Kaulukukui starred in the backfield for the 1934 team. His jersey number 32 was retired by the Hawaii football program.

Assistant coaches included Edward (Bull) Towse (line coach) and Luke (Rusty) Gill (kickers ends, line).

== Schedule ==
Date	Opponent	Site	Result	Attendance	Source
October 10	McKinley alumni	Honolulu Stadium; Honolulu, Territory of Hawaii	W 13–0		
October 31	Honolulu Town Team	Honolulu Stadium; Honolulu, Territory of Hawaii	W 26–7	13,000	
November 16	Kamehameha alumni	Honolulu Stadium; Honolulu, Territory of Hawaii	W 33–0	13,000	
December 1	St. Louis alumni	Honolulu Stadium; Honolulu, Territory of Hawaii	W 20–0		
December 15	Denver	Honolulu Stadium; Honolulu, Territory of Hawaii (Police Relief Ass'n benefit)	W 36–14	18,000–20,000	
January 1, 1935	California	Honolulu Stadium; Honolulu, Territory of Hawaii (New Year's Day Classic)	W 14–0	20,000	
