= 1934 Loyola Lions football team =

American college football season

1934 Loyola Lions football
- Conference: Independent
- Record: 7–2–1
- Head coach: Tom Lieb (5th season)
- Home stadium: Gilmore Stadium

1934 Western college football independents records
	Conf.			Overall
Team	W	L	T	W		L		T
Hawaii		–		6	–	0	–	0
Gonzaga		–		8	–	2	–	1
Saint Mary's		–		7	–	2	–	0
Loyola (CA)		–		7	–	2	–	1
No. 11 Santa Clara		–		7	–	2	–	1
Cal Poly		–		6	–	2	–	0
San Francisco		–		3	–	3	–	1
San Francisco State		–		3	–	3	–	1
Pomona		–		2	–	5	–	1
Humboldt State		–		1	–	3	–	0
Columbia (OR)		–		1	–	6	–	1
Rankings from Associated Press

The 1934 Loyola Lions football team was an American football team that represented Loyola University of Los Angeles (now known as Loyola Marymount University) as an independent during the 1934 college football season. In their fifth season under head coach Tom Lieb, the Lions compiled a 7–2–1 record, shut out five of ten opponents, and outscored opponents by a total of 179 to 44.

== Schedule ==
Date	Opponent	Site	Result	Attendance	Source
September 21	Caltech	Gilmore Stadium; Los Angeles, CA	W 43–0		
September 28	La Verne	Gilmore Stadium; Los Angeles, CA	W 12–0		
October 5	Arizona State	Gilmore Stadium; Los Angeles, CA	W 43–0	10,000	
October 14	at Santa Clara	Gilmore Stadium; Los Angeles, CA	L 0–9	22,000	
October 20	at Arizona	Arizona Stadium; Tucson, AZ	W 6–0	9,000	
October 26	Texas Tech	Gilmore Stadium; Los Angeles, CA	W 12–7	19,000–20,000	
November 2	Redlands	Gilmore Stadium; Los Angeles, CA	W 38–12	10,000	
November 10	at San Diego State	Balboa Stadium; San Diego, CA	W 19–3	3,500	
November 18	San Francisco	Gilmore Stadium; Los Angeles, CA	T 0–0	10,000	
November 29	vs. UCLA	Los Angeles Memorial Coliseum; Los Angeles, CA	L 6–13	30,000	
