= 1934 Humboldt State Lumberjacks football team =

American college football season

1934 Humboldt State Lumberjacks football
- Conference: Independent
- Record: 1–3
- Head coach: Fred Telonicher (8th season)
- Home stadium: Albee Stadium

1934 Western college football independents records
| | Conf. | | | Overall |
| Team | W | L | T | W | | L | | T |
|---|---|---|---|---|---|---|---|---|
| Hawaii | | – | | 6 | – | 0 | – | 0 |
| Gonzaga | | – | | 8 | – | 2 | – | 1 |
| Saint Mary's | | – | | 7 | – | 2 | – | 0 |
| Loyola (CA) | | – | | 7 | – | 2 | – | 1 |
| No. 11 Santa Clara | | – | | 7 | – | 2 | – | 1 |
| Cal Poly | | – | | 6 | – | 2 | – | 0 |
| San Francisco | | – | | 3 | – | 3 | – | 1 |
| San Francisco State | | – | | 3 | – | 3 | – | 1 |
| Pomona | | – | | 2 | – | 5 | – | 1 |
| Humboldt State | | – | | 1 | – | 3 | – | 0 |
| Columbia (OR) | | – | | 1 | – | 6 | – | 1 |
Rankings from Associated Press

The 1934 Humboldt State Lumberjacks football team represented Humboldt State Normal College—now known as California State Polytechnic University, Humboldt—as an independent during the 1934 college football season. Led by Fred Telonicher in his eight and final season as head coach, the Lumberjacks compiled a record of 1–3 and were outscored by their opponents 57 to 31 for the season. The team played home games at Albee Stadium in Eureka, California.

In the eight years Telonicher was coach, the Lumberjacks compiled a record of 8–23–2 (.273).

== Schedule ==
| Date | Opponent | Site | Result | Source |
|---|---|---|---|---|
| | Arcata High School alumni | Albee Stadium; Eureka, CA | L 0–14 | |
| October 20 | at San Francisco State | Ewing Field; San Francisco, CA | L 7–22 | |
| October 27 | Lick Wilmerding | Albee Stadium; Eureka, CA | W 24–6 | |
| November 9 | at Santa Rosa | Bailey Field; Santa Rosa, CA | L 0–21 | |
