= 1934 San Jose State Spartans football team =

American college football season

1934 San Jose State Spartans football

FWC co-champion
- Conference: Far Western Conference
- Record: 3–3–4 (2–0–3 FWC)
- Head coach: Dudley DeGroot (3rd season)
- Home stadium: Spartan Stadium

1934 Far Western Conference football standings
	Conf.					Overall
Team	W		L		T	W		L		T
Fresno State +	3	–	0	–	1	7	–	2	–	1
San Jose State +	2	–	0	–	3	3	–	3	–	4
Chico State	2	–	1	–	1	4	–	3	–	1
Pacific (CA)	2	–	2	–	0	4	–	5	–	0
Cal Aggies	0	–	2	–	2	0	–	5	–	3
Nevada	0	–	4	–	1	1	–	7	–	1
+ – Conference co-champions

The 1934 San Jose State Spartans football team represented State Teachers College at San Jose (Note: San Jose State University was known as State Teachers College at San Jose from 1921 to 1934.) during the 1934 college football season.

San Jose State competed in the Far Western Conference (FWC). (Note: The Northern California Athletic Conference (NCAC) was known as the Far Western Conference (FWC) from its founding in 1925 to 1982.) The team was led by head coach Dudley DeGroot, in his third year, and they played home games at Spartan Stadium in San Jose, California. They finished the season as co-champions of the FWC with a record of three wins, three losses and four ties (3–3–4, 2–0–3 FWC). The Spartans were outscored by their opponents 90–126 for the season.

== Schedule ==
Date	Opponent	Site	Result	Attendance	Source
September 22	at Stanford*	Stanford Stadium; Stanford, CA (rivalry)	L 0–48		
September 29	Santa Barbara Athletic Club*	Spartan Stadium; San Jose, CA	W 28–19		
October 6	Olympic Club*	San Francisco, CA	L 13–19		
October 13	Chico State	Spartan Stadium; San Jose, CA	T 6–6	5,000	
October 20	at Cal Aggies	A Street field; Davis, CA	T 0–0		
October 27	Nevada	Mackay Field; Reno, NV	W 10–0	5,000	
November 3	Fresno State	Spartan Stadium; San Jose, CA (rivary)	T 7–7	7,182	
November 10	Willamette*	Spartan Stadium; San Jose, CA	L 7–21		
November 17	at Pacific (CA)	Baxter Stadium; Stockton, CA (rivalry)	W 13–0		
November 29	at Whittier*	Hadley Field; Whittier, CA	T 6–6		
*Non-conference game
