= 1934 Cal Aggies football team =

American college football season

1934 Cal Aggies football
- Conference: Far Western Conference
- Record: 0–5–3 (0–2–2 FWC)
- Head coach: Crip Toomey (7th season)
- Captain: Bud Wolfe
- Home stadium: A Street field

1934 Far Western Conference football standings
	Conf.					Overall
Team	W		L		T	W		L		T
Fresno State +	3	–	0	–	1	7	–	2	–	1
San Jose State +	2	–	0	–	3	3	–	3	–	4
Chico State	2	–	1	–	1	4	–	3	–	1
Pacific (CA)	2	–	2	–	0	4	–	5	–	0
Cal Aggies	0	–	2	–	2	0	–	5	–	3
Nevada	0	–	4	–	1	1	–	7	–	1
+ – Conference co-champions

The 1934 Cal Aggies football team represented the Northern Branch of the College of Agriculture—now known as the University of California, Davis—as a member of the Far Western Conference (FWC) during the 1933 college football season. Led by seventh-year head coach Crip Toomey, the Aggies compiled an overall record of 0–5–3 with a mark of 0–2–2 in conference play, placing fifth in the FWC. The team was outscored by its opponents 163 to 16 for the season. The Aggies were shut out in six of their eight games. The Cal Aggies played home games at A Street field on campus in Davis, California.

== Schedule ==
Date	Time	Opponent	Site	Result	Attendance	Source
September 29		at California*	California Memorial Stadium; Berkeley, CA	L 0–54		
October 6		at Nevada	Mackay Stadium (Note: This stadium is the predecessor to the current Mackay Stadium, which was opened for the 1966 season.); Reno, NV	T 0–0		
October 20		at San Jose State	A Street field; Davis, CA	T 0–0		
October 27		at UCLA*	Los Angeles Memorial Coliseum; Los Angeles, CA	L 0–49	4,000	
November 3		at Chico State	Chico High School Stadium; Chico, CA	L 3–6		
November 12		at Fresno State	Fresno State College Stadium; Fresno, CA	L 13–40	5,723	
November 17		California JV (Note: The University of California JV team was commonly known as the "Cal Ramblers".)*	A Street field; Davis, CA	L 0–14		
November 29	12:00 p.m.	at Sacramento*	Sacramento Stadium; Sacramento, CA	T 0–0	7,000	
*Non-conference game; All times are in Pacific time
