= 1934 Pacific Tigers football team =

American college football season

1934 Pacific Tigers football
- Conference: Far Western Conference
- Record: 4–5 (2–2 FWC)
- Head coach: Amos Alonzo Stagg (2nd season)
- Home stadium: Baxter Stadium

1934 Far Western Conference football standings
	Conf.					Overall
Team	W		L		T	W		L		T
Fresno State +	3	–	0	–	1	7	–	2	–	1
San Jose State +	2	–	0	–	3	3	–	3	–	4
Chico State	2	–	1	–	1	4	–	3	–	1
Pacific (CA)	2	–	2	–	0	4	–	5	–	0
Cal Aggies	0	–	2	–	2	0	–	5	–	3
Nevada	0	–	4	–	1	1	–	7	–	1
+ – Conference co-champions

The 1934 Pacific Tigers football team represented the College of the Pacific—now known as the University of the Pacific—in Stockton, California as a member of the Far Western Conference (FWC) during the 1934 college football season. Led by second-year head coach Amos Alonzo Stagg, Pacific compiled an overall record of 4–5 with a mark of 2–2 in conference play, placing fourth in the FWC. The team was outscored by its opponents 76 to 67 for the season. The Tigers played home games at Baxter Stadium in Stockton.

== Schedule ==
Date	Opponent	Site	Result	Attendance	Source
September 29	at USC*	Los Angeles Memorial Coliseum; Los Angeles, CA	L 0–6	35,000	
October 13	at California*	California Memorial Stadium; Berkeley, CA	L 6–7		
October 19	Fresno State	Baxter Stadium; Stockton, CA	L 6–7	9,000	
November 2	California JV*	Baxter Stadium; Stockton, CA	W 6–0		
November 9	Nevada	Baxter Stadium; Stockton, CA	W 14–0		
November 17	San Jose State^{†}	Baxter Stadium; Stockton, CA (rivalry)	L 0–13		
November 29	at Chico State	College Field; Chico, CA	W 7–6		
December 7	at Arizona*	Arizona Stadium; Tucson, AZ	L 7–31		
December 15	San Diego Marines (Note: The Marine Corps Recruit Depot (MCRD) in San Diego fielded a team that played against colleges and other military teams from 1922 to 1964.)*	Baxter Stadium; Stockton, CA	W 21–6		
*Non-conference game; ^{†}Homecoming
