= 1934 Santa Clara Broncos football team =

American college football season

1934 Santa Clara Broncos football
- Conference: Independent
- Record: 7–2–1
- Head coach: Clipper Smith (6th season)
- Home stadium: Kezar Stadium

1934 Western college football independents records
	Conf.			Overall
Team	W	L	T	W		L		T
Hawaii		–		6	–	0	–	0
Gonzaga		–		8	–	2	–	1
Saint Mary's		–		7	–	2	–	0
Loyola (CA)		–		7	–	2	–	1
No. 11 Santa Clara		–		7	–	2	–	1
Cal Poly		–		6	–	2	–	0
San Francisco		–		3	–	3	–	1
San Francisco State		–		3	–	3	–	1
Pomona		–		2	–	5	–	1
Humboldt State		–		1	–	3	–	0
Columbia (OR)		–		1	–	6	–	1
Rankings from Associated Press

The 1934 Santa Clara Broncos football team was an American football team that represented Santa Clara University as an independent during the 1934 college football season. In their sixth season under head coach Clipper Smith, the Broncos compiled a 7–2–1 record and outscored opponents by a total of 133 to 35. They defeated Pacific Coast Conference opponent California (20–0), tied Stanford (7–7), and sustained their only losses to rival Saint Mary's (0–7) and TCU (7–9).

== Schedule ==
Date	Opponent	Site	Result	Attendance	Source
September 22	Nevada	Kezar Stadium; San Francisco, CA	W 40–0	10,000	
September 29	at Stanford	Stanford Stadium; Stanford, CA	T 7–7	40,000	
October 7	vs. San Francisco	Kezar Stadium; San Francisco, CA	W 6–0	30,000	
October 14	at Loyola (CA)	Gilmore Stadium; Los Angeles, CA	W 9–0	22,000	
October 21	Olympic Club	Kezar Stadium; San Francisco, CA	W 13–6		
October 27	at Fresno State	Fresno State College Stadium; Fresno, CA	W 19–0	10,000	
November 3	at California	California Memorial Stadium; Berkeley, CA	W 20–0	35,000	
November 18	vs. Saint Mary's	Kezar Stadium; San Francisco, CA	L 0–7	60,000	
November 25	at Columbia (OR)	Multnomah Stadium; Portland, OR	W 12–6		
December 8	at TCU	T.C.U. Stadium; Fort Worth, TX	L 7–9	3,500	
