= 1934 Stanford Indians football team =

American college football season

1934 Stanford Indians football
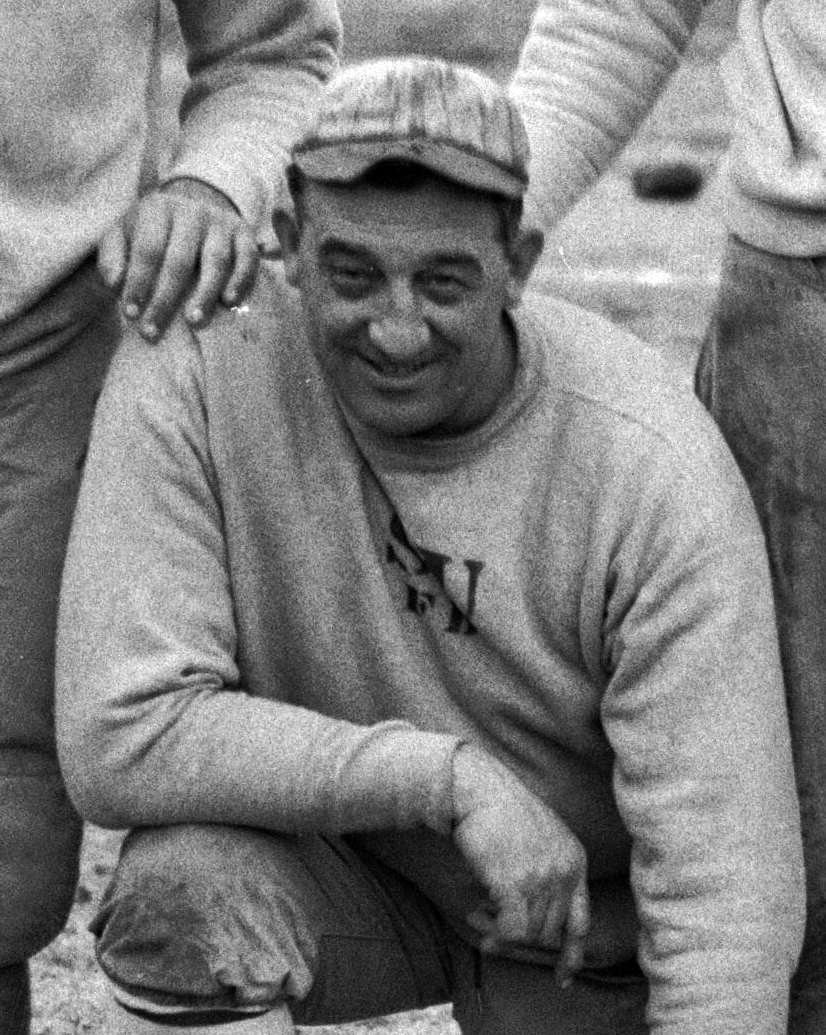
- Head coach Tiny Thornhill

PCC champion

Rose Bowl, L 13–29 vs. Alabama
- Conference: Pacific Coast Conference
- Record: 9–1–1 (5–0 PCC)
- Head coach: Tiny Thornhill (2nd season)
- Home stadium: Stanford Stadium

1934 Pacific Coast Conference football standings
	Conf.					Overall
Team	W		L		T	W		L		T
No. 2 Stanford $	5	–	0	–	0	9	–	1	–	1
Washington State	4	–	0	–	1	4	–	3	–	1
Washington	5	–	1	–	1	6	–	1	–	1
Oregon	4	–	2	–	0	6	–	4	–	0
California	3	–	2	–	0	6	–	6	–	0
UCLA	2	–	3	–	0	7	–	3	–	0
USC	1	–	4	–	1	4	–	6	–	1
Idaho	1	–	4	–	0	3	–	5	–	0
Oregon State	0	–	5	–	2	3	–	6	–	2
Montana	0	–	4	–	1	2	–	5	–	1
$ – Conference champion; Rankings from Associated Press

The 1934 Stanford Indians football team represented Stanford University as a member of the Pacific Coast Conference (PCC) during the 1934 college football season. In head coach Tiny Thornhill's second season as head coach, the Indians compiled an overall record of 9–1–1 with a mark of 5–0 in conference play, winning the PCC title. Stanford allowed only 14 points during the regular season and logged seven shutout victories This was the second season that the "Vow Boys" kept their vow and defeated USC. The team represented the conference in the Rose Bowl, losing to Alabama, 29–13.

The team was rated No. 1 by the contemporary Houlgate System and presented with the Foreman & Clark national championship trophy.

== Schedule ==
Date	Opponent	Site	Result	Attendance	Source
September 22	San Jose State*	Stanford Stadium; Stanford, CA (rivalry)	W 48–0	10,000	
September 29	Santa Clara*	Stanford Stadium; Stanford, CA	T 7–7	40,000	
October 6	at Oregon State	Multnomah Stadium; Portland, OR	W 17–7	12,000	
October 13	Northwestern*	Stanford Stadium; Stanford, CA	W 20–0		
October 20	at San Francisco*	Kezar Stadium; San Francisco, CA	W 3–0		
October 27	USC	Stanford Stadium; Stanford, CA (rivalry)	W 16–0	48,000	
November 3	at UCLA	Los Angeles Memorial Coliseum; Los Angeles, CA	W 27–0	50,000	
November 10	Washington	Stanford Stadium; Stanford, CA	W 24–0	55,000	
November 17	Olympic Club*	Stanford Stadium; Stanford, CA	W 40–0		
November 24	at California	California Memorial Stadium; Berkeley, CA (Big Game)	W 9–7	70,000	
January 1, 1935	vs. Alabama*	Rose Bowl; Pasadena, CA (Rose Bowl)	L 13–29	84,474	
*Non-conference game; Source:
