= 1934 San Francisco Dons football team =

American college football season

1934 San Francisco Dons football
- Conference: Independent
- Record: 3–3–1
- Head coach: Spud Lewis (3rd season)
- Home stadium: Kezar Stadium

1934 Western college football independents records
	Conf.			Overall
Team	W	L	T	W		L		T
Hawaii		–		6	–	0	–	0
Gonzaga		–		8	–	2	–	1
Saint Mary's		–		7	–	2	–	0
Loyola (CA)		–		7	–	2	–	1
No. 11 Santa Clara		–		7	–	2	–	1
Cal Poly		–		6	–	2	–	0
San Francisco		–		3	–	3	–	1
San Francisco State		–		3	–	3	–	1
Pomona		–		2	–	5	–	1
Humboldt State		–		1	–	3	–	0
Columbia (OR)		–		1	–	6	–	1
Rankings from Associated Press

The 1934 San Francisco Dons football team was an American football team that represented the University of San Francisco as an independent during the 1934 college football season. In their third season under head coach Spud Lewis, the Dons compiled a 3–3–1 record and outscored their opponents by a combined total of 47 to 16.

== Schedule ==
Date	Opponent	Site	Result	Attendance	Source
September 29	at Oregon State	Bell Field; Corvallis, OR	W 10–0		
October 7	Santa Clara	Kezar Stadium; San Francisco	L 0–6	30,000	
October 20	Stanford	Kezar Stadium; San Francisco	L 0–3		
November 4	Gonzaga	Kezar Stadium; San Francisco	W 28–0	20,000	
November 11	Olympic Club	Kezar Stadium; San Francisco	W 6–0		
November 18	at Loyola (CA)	Gilmore Stadium; Los Angeles	T 0–0	10,000	
December 9	Saint Mary's	Kezar Stadium; San Francisco	L 3–7	45,000	
