= 1934 Nevada Wolf Pack football team =

American college football season

1934 Nevada Wolf Pack football
- Conference: Far Western Conference
- Record: 1–7–1 (0–4–1 FWC)
- Head coach: Brick Mitchell (3rd season)
- Home stadium: Mackay Field

1934 Far Western Conference football standings
	Conf.					Overall
Team	W		L		T	W		L		T
Fresno State +	3	–	0	–	1	7	–	2	–	1
San Jose State +	2	–	0	–	3	3	–	3	–	4
Chico State	2	–	1	–	1	4	–	3	–	1
Pacific (CA)	2	–	2	–	0	4	–	5	–	0
Cal Aggies	0	–	2	–	2	0	–	5	–	3
Nevada	0	–	4	–	1	1	–	7	–	1
+ – Conference co-champions

The 1934 Nevada Wolf Pack football team was an American football team that represented the University of Nevada in the Far Western Conference (FWC) during the 1934 college football season. In their third season under head coach Brick Mitchell, the team compiled a 1–7–1 record (0–4–1 FWC) and finished last in the conference.

Vic Carroll played tackle for the 1934 team. He later played 12 seasons in the National Football League (NFL) for the Boston/Washington Redskins and the New York Giants.

== Schedule ==
Date	Opponent	Site	Result	Attendance	Source
September 22	at Santa Clara*	Kezar Stadium; San Francisco, CA	L 0–40	10,000	
September 29	at California*	California Memorial Stadium; Berkeley, CA	L 0–33		
October 6	Cal Aggies	Mackay Field; Reno, NV	T 0–0		
October 12	at Saint Mary's*	Kezar Stadium; San Francisco, CA	W 9–7	25,000	
October 20	California Ramblers*	Mackay Field; Reno, NV	L 0–7	3,000	
October 27	San Jose State^{†}	Mackay Field; Reno, NV	L 0–10	5,000	
November 9	at Pacific (CA)	Baxter Stadium; Stockton, CA	L 0–14		
November 17	Chico State	Mackay Field; Reno, NV	L 6–9	2,000	
November 29	at Fresno State	Fresno State College Stadium; Fresno, CA	L 0–33		
*Non-conference game; ^{†}Homecoming
