= 1934 Columbia Irish football team =

American college football season

1934 Columbia Irish football
- Conference: Independent
- Record: 1–6–1
- Head coach: Gene Murphy (8th season)
- Home stadium: Multnomah Stadium

1934 Western college football independents records
	Conf.			Overall
Team	W	L	T	W		L		T
Hawaii		–		6	–	0	–	0
Gonzaga		–		8	–	2	–	1
Saint Mary's		–		7	–	2	–	0
Loyola (CA)		–		7	–	2	–	1
No. 11 Santa Clara		–		7	–	2	–	1
Cal Poly		–		6	–	2	–	0
San Francisco		–		3	–	3	–	1
San Francisco State		–		3	–	3	–	1
Pomona		–		2	–	5	–	1
Humboldt State		–		1	–	3	–	0
Columbia (OR)		–		1	–	6	–	1
Rankings from Associated Press

The 1934 Columbia Irish football team was an American football team that represented Columbia University (later renamed the University of Portland) as an independent during the 1934 college football season. In its eighth year under head coach Gene Murphy, the team compiled a 1–6–1 record. The team played its home games at Multnomah Stadium in Portland, Oregon. The school changed its name in 1935, and the football team became known as the "Portland Pilots".

== Schedule ==
Date	Opponent	Site	Result	Attendance	Source
September 30	at Saint Mary's	Kezar Stadium; San Francisco, CA	L 0–61	10,000	
October 5	Albany	Multnomah Stadium; Portland, OR	W 13–0		
October 12	at Oregon State	Bell Field; Corvallis, OR	L 12–39		
October 20	Pacific (OR)	Multnomah Stadium; Portland, OR	T 13–13		
October 28	Gonzaga	Multnomah Stadium; Portland, OR	L 0–18		
November 9	at Linfield	McMinnville, OR	L 0–9		
November 17	Willamette	Multnomah Stadium; Portland, OR	L 0–7		
November 25	Santa Clara	Multnomah Stadium; Portland, OR	L 6–12		
