= 1934 Oregon Webfoots football team =

American college football season

1934 Oregon Webfoots football
- Conference: Pacific Coast Conference
- Record: 6–4 (4–2 PCC)
- Head coach: Prink Callison (3rd season)
- Captains: Butch Morse; Robert Parke
- Home stadium: Hayward Field

1934 Pacific Coast Conference football standings
| | Conf. | | | | | Overall |
| Team | W | | L | | T | W | | L | | T |
|---|---|---|---|---|---|---|---|---|---|---|
| No. 2 Stanford $ | 5 | – | 0 | – | 0 | 9 | – | 1 | – | 1 |
| Washington State | 4 | – | 0 | – | 1 | 4 | – | 3 | – | 1 |
| Washington | 5 | – | 1 | – | 1 | 6 | – | 1 | – | 1 |
| Oregon | 4 | – | 2 | – | 0 | 6 | – | 4 | – | 0 |
| California | 3 | – | 2 | – | 0 | 6 | – | 6 | – | 0 |
| UCLA | 2 | – | 3 | – | 0 | 7 | – | 3 | – | 0 |
| USC | 1 | – | 4 | – | 1 | 4 | – | 6 | – | 1 |
| Idaho | 1 | – | 4 | – | 0 | 3 | – | 5 | – | 0 |
| Oregon State | 0 | – | 5 | – | 2 | 3 | – | 6 | – | 2 |
| Montana | 0 | – | 4 | – | 1 | 2 | – | 5 | – | 1 |
$ – Conference champion; Rankings from Associated Press

The 1934 Oregon Webfoots football team represented the University of Oregon in the Pacific Coast Conference (PCC) during the 1934 college football season. In their third season under head coach Prink Callison, the Webfoots compiled a 6–4 record (4–2 against PCC opponents), finished in fourth place in the PCC, and outscored their opponents, 108 to 98. The team played its home games at Hayward Field in Eugene, Oregon.

== Schedule ==
| Date | Opponent | Site | Result | Attendance | Source |
|---|---|---|---|---|---|
| September 23 | Gonzaga* | Hayward Field; Eugene, OR | W 13–0 | | |
| September 29 | UCLA | Multnomah Stadium; Portland, OR | W 26–3 | 15,000 | |
| October 13 | Washington | Multnomah Stadium; Portland, OR (rivalry) | L 6–16 | 28,663 | |
| October 20 | at Idaho | MacLean Field; Moscow, ID | W 13–6 | 7,000 | |
| October 27 | at Utah* | Ute Stadium; Salt Lake City, UT | W 8–7 | 20,000 | |
| November 3 | Montana | Hayward Field; Eugene, OR | W 13–0 | | |
| November 10 | vs. Oregon State | Multnomah Stadium; Portland, OR (rivalry) | W 9–6 | 22,000 | |
| November 17 | at USC | Los Angeles Memorial Coliseum; Los Angeles, CA | L 0–33 | 20,000–30,000 | |
| November 29 | at Saint Mary's* | Kezar Stadium; San Francisco, CA (Governors' Trophy Game) | L 7–13 | 14,000 | |
| December 15 | at LSU* | Tiger Stadium; Baton Rouge, LA | L 13–14 | 10,000 | |
*Non-conference game; Source:
