= 1934 Idaho Vandals football team =

American college football season

1934 Idaho Vandals football
- Conference: Pacific Coast Conference
- Record: 3–5 (1–4 PCC)
- Head coach: Leo Calland (6th season)
- Home stadium: MacLean Field

1934 Pacific Coast Conference football standings
	Conf.					Overall
Team	W		L		T	W		L		T
No. 2 Stanford $	5	–	0	–	0	9	–	1	–	1
Washington State	4	–	0	–	1	4	–	3	–	1
Washington	5	–	1	–	1	6	–	1	–	1
Oregon	4	–	2	–	0	6	–	4	–	0
California	3	–	2	–	0	6	–	6	–	0
UCLA	2	–	3	–	0	7	–	3	–	0
USC	1	–	4	–	1	4	–	6	–	1
Idaho	1	–	4	–	0	3	–	5	–	0
Oregon State	0	–	5	–	2	3	–	6	–	2
Montana	0	–	4	–	1	2	–	5	–	1
$ – Conference champion; Rankings from Associated Press

The 1934 Idaho Vandals football team represented the University of Idaho in the 1934 college football season. The Vandals were led by sixth-year head coach Leo Calland, and were members of the Pacific Coast Conference. Home games were played on campus in Moscow at MacLean Field, with none in Boise this year.

Idaho compiled a 3–5 overall record and lost all but one of its five games in the PCC.

In the Battle of the Palouse with neighbor Washington State, the Vandals suffered a seventh straight loss, falling 0–19 in Pullman on November 10. Idaho's most recent win in the series was nine years earlier in 1925 and the next was twenty years away in 1954.

Calland resigned after the season in mid-December; he compiled a 21–30 (.412) record in six seasons on the Palouse, but his overmatched Vandals were just 5–25 (.167) in conference play, defeating only Montana. He returned to southern California and coached at San Diego State College; his successor at Idaho was Ted Bank, the backs coach at Tulane of New Orleans, 10–1 in 1934 and Sugar Bowl champions.

== Schedule ==
Date	Opponent	Site	Result	Attendance	Source
September 29	at Washington	Husky Stadium; Seattle, WA	L 0–13	15,385	
October 6	Gonzaga*	MacLean Field; Moscow, ID (rivalry)	L 20–24	6,500	
October 20	Oregon^{†}	MacLean Field; Moscow, ID	L 6–13	7,000	
October 27	at Montana	Dornblaser Field; Missoula, MT (rivalry)	W 13–6		
November 3	College of Idaho*	MacLean Field; Moscow, ID	W 12–0	2,500	
November 10	at Washington State	Rogers Field; Pullman, WA (Battle of the Palouse)	L 0–19	11,000	
November 17	at California	California Memorial Stadium; Berkeley, CA	L 13–45	15,000	
November 29	at Creighton*	Creighton Stadium; Omaha, NE	W 13–0	5,000	
*Non-conference game; ^{†}Homecoming; Source:

== All-conference ==
No Vandals were named to the All-Coast team; honorable mention were end Norman Iverson and tackle Bob McCue.
