= 1934 Washington Huskies football team =

American college football season

1934 Washington Huskies football
- Conference: Pacific Coast Conference
- Record: 6–1–1 (5–1–1 PCC)
- Head coach: Jimmy Phelan (5th season)
- Captain: Woodrow Ullin
- Home stadium: University of Washington Stadium

1934 Pacific Coast Conference football standings
	Conf.					Overall
Team	W		L		T	W		L		T
No. 2 Stanford $	5	–	0	–	0	9	–	1	–	1
Washington State	4	–	0	–	1	4	–	3	–	1
Washington	5	–	1	–	1	6	–	1	–	1
Oregon	4	–	2	–	0	6	–	4	–	0
California	3	–	2	–	0	6	–	6	–	0
UCLA	2	–	3	–	0	7	–	3	–	0
USC	1	–	4	–	1	4	–	6	–	1
Idaho	1	–	4	–	0	3	–	5	–	0
Oregon State	0	–	5	–	2	3	–	6	–	2
Montana	0	–	4	–	1	2	–	5	–	1
$ – Conference champion; Rankings from Associated Press

The 1934 Washington Huskies football team was an American football team that represented the University of Washington during the 1934 college football season. In its fifth season under head coach Jimmy Phelan, the team compiled a 6–1–1 record, finished in third place in the Pacific Coast Conference, and outscored all opponents by a combined total of 104 to 51. Woodrow Ullin was the team captain.

== Schedule ==
Date	Opponent	Site	Result	Attendance	Source
September 29	Idaho	University of Washington Stadium; Seattle, WA	W 13–0	15,385	
October 13	at Oregon	Multnomah Stadium; Portland, OR (rivalry)	W 16–6	28,663	
October 27	California	University of Washington Stadium; Seattle, WA	W 13–7	35,000	
November 3	Oregon State	University of Washington Stadium; Seattle, WA	W 14–7	12,000	
November 10	at Stanford	Stanford Stadium; Stanford, CA	L 0–24	55,000	
November 17	Puget Sound*	University of Washington Stadium; Seattle, WA	W 34–0	10,000	
November 24	Washington State	University of Washington Stadium; Seattle, WA (rivalry)	T 0–0	38,000	
December 1	at USC	Los Angeles Memorial Coliseum; Los Angeles, CA	W 14–7	35,000	
*Non-conference game; Source:
