= 1934 Gonzaga Bulldogs football team =

American college football season

1934 Gonzaga Bulldogs football
- Conference: Independent
- Record: 8–2–1
- Head coach: Mike Pecarovich (4th season)
- Home stadium: Gonzaga Stadium

1934 Western college football independents records
	Conf.			Overall
Team	W	L	T	W		L		T
Hawaii		–		6	–	0	–	0
Gonzaga		–		8	–	2	–	1
Saint Mary's		–		7	–	2	–	0
Loyola (CA)		–		7	–	2	–	1
No. 11 Santa Clara		–		7	–	2	–	1
Cal Poly		–		6	–	2	–	0
San Francisco		–		3	–	3	–	1
San Francisco State		–		3	–	3	–	1
Pomona		–		2	–	5	–	1
Humboldt State		–		1	–	3	–	0
Columbia (OR)		–		1	–	6	–	1
Rankings from Associated Press

The 1934 Gonzaga Bulldogs football team was an American football team that represented Gonzaga University during the 1934 college football season. In their fourth year under head coach Mike Pecarovich, the Bulldogs compiled an 8–2–1 record, shut out six of their 11 opponents, and outscored all opponents by a total of 180 to 71. The team's victories included three against Pacific Coast Conference teams. The team's only losses were to Oregon and San Francisco.

The team was led by triple-threat halfback Ike Petersen who was one of the leading scorers in college football during the 1934 season. Petersen went on to play in the National Football League for the Chicago Cardinals in 1935 and the Detroit Lions in 1936.

== Schedule ==
Date	Time	Opponent	Site	Result	Attendance	Source
September 22		at Oregon	Hayward Field; Eugene, OR	L 0–13		
September 28		Cheney Normal	Gonzaga Stadium; Spokane, WA	W 31–0	3,500	
October 6		at Idaho	MacLean Field; Moscow, ID (rivalry)	W 24–20	6,500	
October 13		Washington State	Gonzaga Stadium; Spokane, WA	W 13–6	11,000	
October 20		at Puget Sound	Tacoma Stadium; Tacoma, WA	W 33–0	5,000	
October 28		at Columbia (OR)	Multnomah Stadium; Portland, OR	W 18–0		
November 4		at San Francisco	Kezar Stadium; San Francisco, CA	L 0–28	20,000	
November 9		at Washburn	Topeka, KS	W 2–0		
November 17	12:30 p.m.	at Wichita	Wichita University Stadium; Wichita, KS	T 0–0	4,000	
November 25		Montana School of Mines	Gonzaga Stadium; Spokane, WA	W 53–0		
November 29		at Montana	Dornblaser Field; Missoula, MT	W 6–4	> 3,000	
All times are in Pacific time
