= 1934 California Golden Bears football team =

American college football season

1934 California Golden Bears football
- Conference: Pacific Coast Conference
- Record: 6–6 (3–2 PCC)
- Head coach: Bill Ingram (4th season)
- Home stadium: California Memorial Stadium

1934 Pacific Coast Conference football standings
| | Conf. | | | | | Overall |
| Team | W | | L | | T | W | | L | | T |
|---|---|---|---|---|---|---|---|---|---|---|
| No. 2 Stanford $ | 5 | – | 0 | – | 0 | 9 | – | 1 | – | 1 |
| Washington State | 4 | – | 0 | – | 1 | 4 | – | 3 | – | 1 |
| Washington | 5 | – | 1 | – | 1 | 6 | – | 1 | – | 1 |
| Oregon | 4 | – | 2 | – | 0 | 6 | – | 4 | – | 0 |
| California | 3 | – | 2 | – | 0 | 6 | – | 6 | – | 0 |
| UCLA | 2 | – | 3 | – | 0 | 7 | – | 3 | – | 0 |
| USC | 1 | – | 4 | – | 1 | 4 | – | 6 | – | 1 |
| Idaho | 1 | – | 4 | – | 0 | 3 | – | 5 | – | 0 |
| Oregon State | 0 | – | 5 | – | 2 | 3 | – | 6 | – | 2 |
| Montana | 0 | – | 4 | – | 1 | 2 | – | 5 | – | 1 |
$ – Conference champion; Rankings from Associated Press

The 1934 California Golden Bears football team was an American football team that represented the University of California, Berkeley during the 1934 college football season. Under head coach Bill Ingram, the team compiled an overall record of 6–6 and 3–2 in conference.

== Schedule ==
| Date | Opponent | Site | Result | Attendance | Source |
|---|---|---|---|---|---|
| September 29 | Cal Aggies* | California Memorial Stadium; Berkeley, CA | W 54–0 | | |
| September 29 | Nevada* | California Memorial Stadium; Berkeley, CA | W 33–0 | | |
| October 6 | Saint Mary's* | California Memorial Stadium; Berkeley, CA | L 0–7 | 65,000 | |
| October 13 | Pacific (CA)* | California Memorial Stadium; Berkeley, CA | W 7–6 | | |
| October 20 | UCLA | California Memorial Stadium; Berkeley, CA (rivalry) | W 3–0 | 30,000 | |
| October 27 | at Washington | Husky Stadium; Seattle, WA | L 7–13 | 35,000 | |
| November 3 | Santa Clara* | California Memorial Stadium; Berkeley, CA | L 0–20 | 35,000 | |
| November 10 | at USC | Los Angeles Memorial Coliseum; Los Angeles, CA | W 7–2 | 60,000 | |
| November 17 | Idaho | California Memorial Stadium; Berkeley, CA | W 45–13 | 15,000 | |
| November 24 | Stanford | California Memorial Stadium; Berkeley, CA (Big Game) | L 7–9 | 70,000 | |
| December 25 | at Hawaii All-Stars* | Honolulu Stadium; Honolulu, Territory of Hawaii | L 13–26 | 11,000 | |
| January 1, 1935 | at Hawaii* | Honolulu Stadium; Honolulu, Territory of Hawaii (New Year's Day Classic) | L 0–14 | 19,000 | |
*Non-conference game; Source:
