= 1934 USC Trojans football team =

American college football season

1934 USC Trojans football
- Conference: Pacific Coast Conference
- Record: 4–6–1 (1–4–1 PCC)
- Head coach: Howard Jones (10th season)
- Captain: Julie Bescos
- Home stadium: Los Angeles Memorial Coliseum

1934 Pacific Coast Conference football standings
	Conf.					Overall
Team	W		L		T	W		L		T
No. 2 Stanford $	5	–	0	–	0	9	–	1	–	1
Washington State	4	–	0	–	1	4	–	3	–	1
Washington	5	–	1	–	1	6	–	1	–	1
Oregon	4	–	2	–	0	6	–	4	–	0
California	3	–	2	–	0	6	–	6	–	0
UCLA	2	–	3	–	0	7	–	3	–	0
USC	1	–	4	–	1	4	–	6	–	1
Idaho	1	–	4	–	0	3	–	5	–	0
Oregon State	0	–	5	–	2	3	–	6	–	2
Montana	0	–	4	–	1	2	–	5	–	1
$ – Conference champion; Rankings from Associated Press

The 1934 USC Trojans football team represented the University of Southern California (USC) in the 1934 college football season. In their tenth year under head coach Howard Jones, the Trojans compiled a 4–6–1 record (1–4–1 against conference opponents), finished in seventh place in the Pacific Coast Conference, and outscored their opponents by a combined total of 120 to 110.

== Schedule ==
Date	Opponent	Site	Result	Attendance	Source
September 22	Occidental*	Los Angeles Memorial Coliseum; Los Angeles, CA	W 20–0	30,000	
September 22	Whittier*	Los Angeles Memorial Coliseum; Los Angeles, CA	W 40–14	30,000	
September 29	Pacific (CA)*	Los Angeles Memorial Coliseum; Los Angeles, CA	W 6–0	40,000	
October 6	Washington State	Los Angeles Memorial Coliseum; Los Angeles, CA	L 0–19	50,000	
October 13	at Pittsburgh*	Pitt Stadium; Pittsburgh, PA	L 6–20	55,000	
October 20	Oregon State	Los Angeles Memorial Coliseum; Los Angeles, CA	T 6–6	40,000	
October 27	at Stanford	Stanford Stadium; Stanford, CA (rivalry)	L 0–16	48,000	
November 10	California	Los Angeles Memorial Coliseum; Los Angeles, CA	L 2–7	60,000	
November 17	Oregon	Los Angeles Memorial Coliseum; Los Angeles, CA	W 33–0	20,000–30,000	
December 1	Washington	Los Angeles Memorial Coliseum; Los Angeles, CA	L 7–14	35,000	
December 8	Notre Dame*^{†}	Los Angeles Memorial Coliseum; Los Angeles, CA (rivalry)	L 0–14	45,568	
*Non-conference game; ^{†}Homecoming; Source:
