= Laborer =

Worker using physical exertion

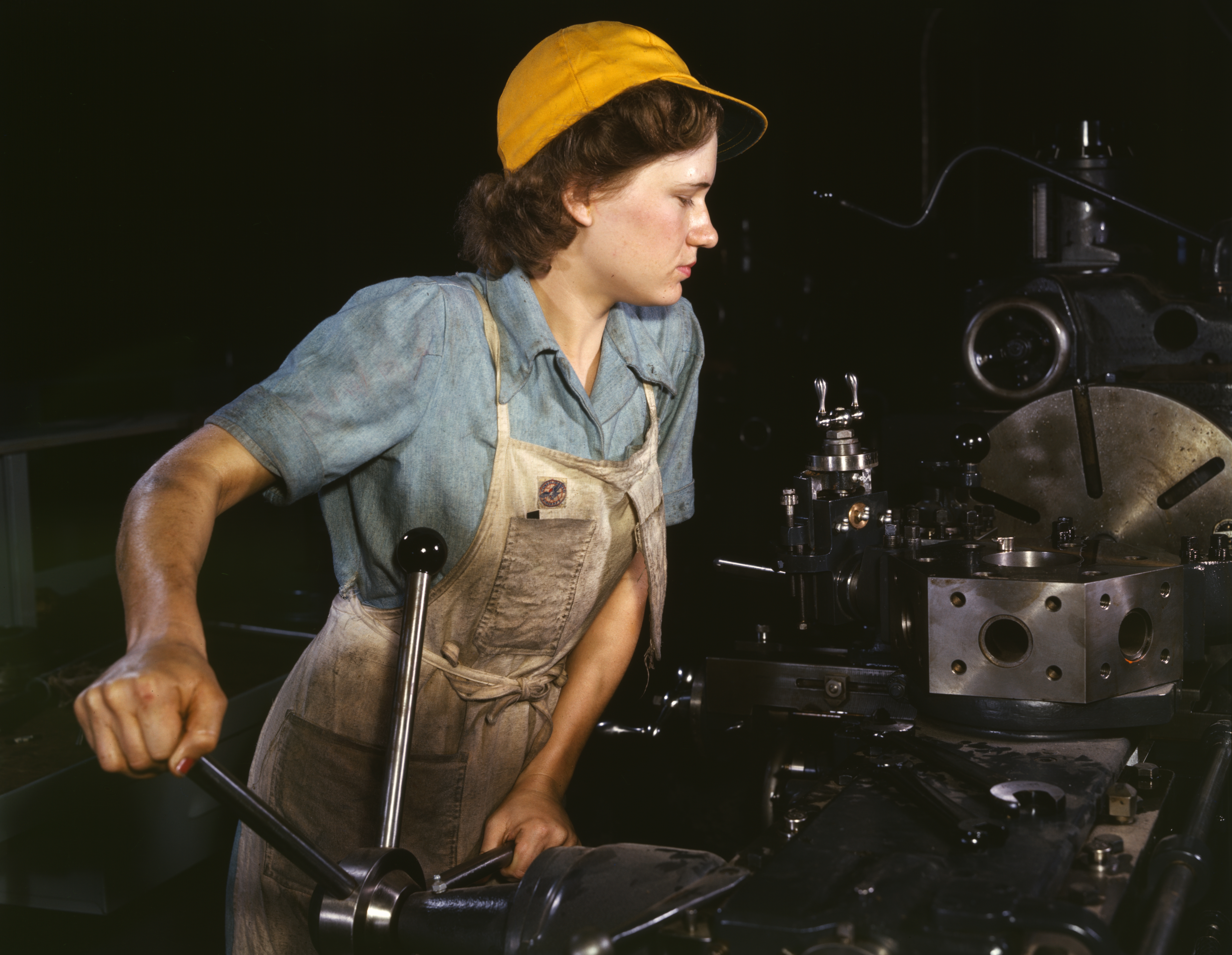
- Turret lathe operator machining parts for transport planes at a Consolidated Aircraft plant, Fort Worth, Texas, 1942.

Occupation
- Occupation type: Manual labor
- Activity sectors: Construction, Manufacturing

Description
- Fields of employment: Construction site, Yard Manufacturing
- Related jobs: Construction worker

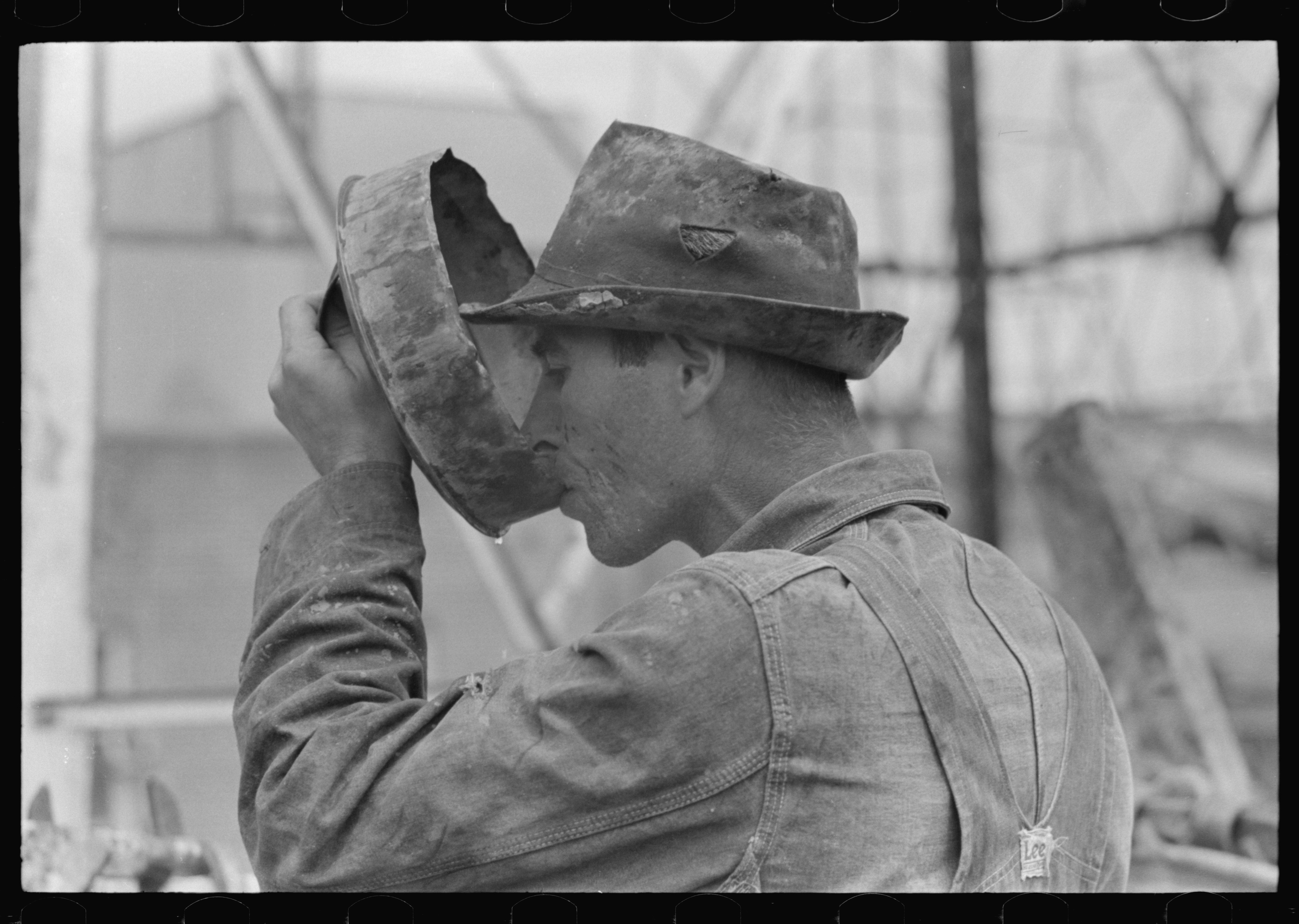
A Lone Driller's Water Break drinking from a battered pan one of the many Laborers during the Texas Oil Boom in Kilgore, Texas, 1939

A laborer (or labourer in British English) is a person who works in manual labor.

Laborers are in a working class of wage-earners in which their only possession of significant material value is their labor.

Industries employing laborers include building things such as roads, road paving, buildings, bridges, tunnels, pipelines civil and industrial, and railway tracks. Laborers work with blasting tools, hand tools, power tools, air tools, and small heavy equipment, and act as assistants to tradesmen as well such as operators or cement masons.

The 1st century BC engineer Vitruvius writes that a good crew of laborers is just as valuable as any other aspect of construction. Other than the addition of pneumatics, laborer practices have changed little. With the introduction of field technologies, the laborers have been quick to adapt to the use of this technology as being laborers' workforce.

== Tools and equipment ==
The following tools are considered a minimum for a laborer to keep with them: hammer, pliers w/ side-cutters, utility knife, tape measure, locking pliers, crescent wrench, screwdriver, margin trowel, carpenter's pencil or soapstone, tool belt and one pouch (bag). In addition: a five gallon bucket with additional tools, toolbelt suspenders, water jug and lunchbox are recommended.

Most safety equipment that is consumed or work specific, for example hard hat, safety glasses, hearing protection, gloves, fall protection, high-visibility clothing, concrete boots, respirator/dust mask and toe guards are provided by the employer as part of construction site safety.

Personal safety equipment, for example, full leather boots (some long-time laborers believe steel toes are dangerous on the construction site; it is better to have crushed toes than toes cut off by the crushed steel - a belief proven wrong by several studies), high-strength pants - canvas or denim (some modify thighs with a sacrificial second layer of jean fabric cut from an old pair) - socks, lip balm, and climate-specific outerwear, are provided by the individual (unless laborers are instructed to work in a climate different from what they typically reside in, for example, high elevation).

== Types of work ==
Some of the work done by laborers includes:

- concrete – shotcrete, gunite, grouting and formwork
- demolition – concrete cutting, pavement breaking, cutting and removal of interior building parts (framing members, doors, windows, wiring, piping, etc.)
- environmental remediation and hazardous waste
- fences and landscaping
- Mowing and keeping construction site free of weeds
- street sweeping
- Cleaning of the construction site and trash removal
- Setting up temporary lights, heaters and other things needed on site
- hod carrier – masonry, plasterers and fireproofing
- paving – white paving formwork, traffic control, striping, signs
- piping – water pipe, sewer and storm drain
- field technology
- general digging and grading
- tunnels – drilling and blasting
- Dry utilities – Electrical and communications conduit
- loading and offloading – handling of physical goods, such as construction materials

== Pay ==
As a manual labor occupation, to attract free workers the wages paid to laborers are higher than those paid in general to other types of unskilled workers (see dirty, dangerous and demeaning). In the United States, a union laborer earns equal or greater than most work available to anyone with a bachelor's degree. This is one of a few fields where someone without a high school diploma can still earn a living wage. Union, heavy construction and highway construction laborers earn on average (2008 US) $25.47/h compared to 13.72/h for non-union laborers. In addition to paid earnings, union laborers enjoy the benefits of medical insurance, vacation pay, pension plans, representation and vocational schools; totaling $45/hr (2012 US) and some with special skills earn 'over-rate' wages. It is not uncommon for young civil engineers, construction managers and construction engineers typical salary of (2007 US$) 40,000 to 60,000 to fall short of their union laborers average wages of 50,000 to 80,000.

However, unlike engineers, laborers are not usually employed full-time year-round and face significant hazards. The additional pay laborers receive is often balanced out by the lesser unemployment checks they receive while out of work and the disability checks they receive while injured—often debilitated for life. That is if unemployment and injury insurance is provided, which is often not the case unless they are labor union members. Engineers are also not immune to being out of work. In heavy civil work, some are employed on a project basis and mental injuries due to stress are a different but debilitating hazard. Because of the wide range of skills and ability to simply provide muscle, laborers often earn side-work as independent contractors and under-the-table work.

In construction, the pay for laborers is low enough that planning problems can be solved by "throwing laborers at it." This can become a toxic and dangerous brew of unplanned work that slides forward on the blood and sweat of hard-working laborers—injury rates often soar. The value of work put in place by laborers and the value of avoided rework and increased efficiencies produced by the engineers' planning is a balance of resource utilization on any large project.

== Hazards and conditions ==
There are dangers associated with laboring. Many laborers are severely injured or killed in accidents each year while performing work duties. Many who work as laborers for even a short period of time will suffer from permanent work injuries such as: hearing loss, arthritis, osteoarthritis, back injuries, eye injury, head injury, chemical burn (lime sensitivity), lung disease, missing fingernails and skin scars. Alcoholism, drug use, and drug abuse are common although most companies require drug screening for all new hires. If a laborer is injured on the job they are immediately given a drug test. If the test results are positive then they are ineligible for any Workers' compensation benefits. There is a gray area for the use of marijuana due to medical marijuana prescriptions. Some who have been dismissed for failing a drug test while possessing a prescription have been later reinstated with pay as having been wrongfully terminated.

== Collective bargaining ==
The Laborers' International Union of North America (LIUNA) represents laborers on public and private projects in North America. Some of the business representatives are laborers who have been so severely injured they can no longer labor. With a phone call and a good reason they will be on-site the next morning asking questions and demanding apologies for mistreatment of laborers.

== Images ==
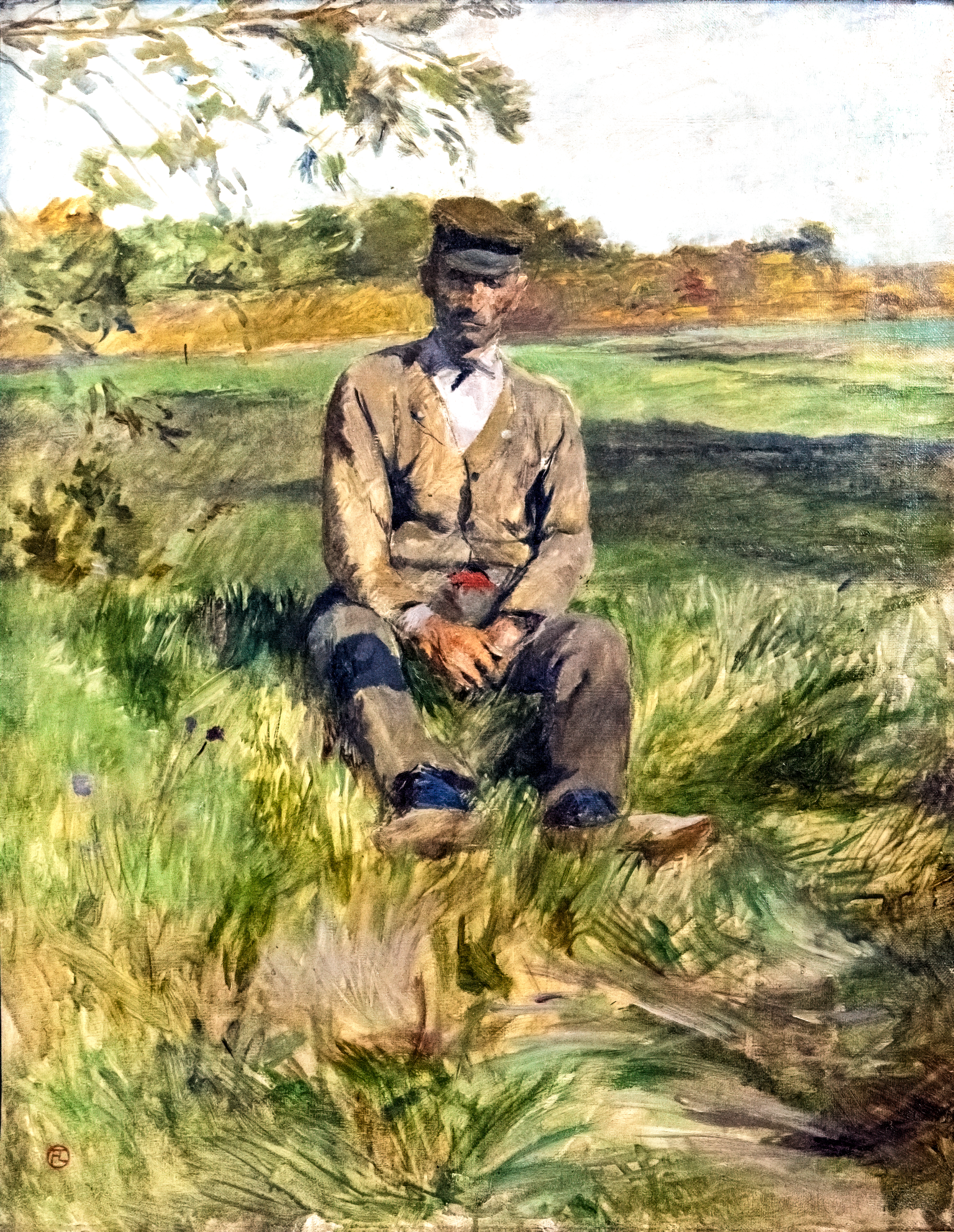
'Un ouvrier à Céleyran,' by Henri de Toulouse-Lautrec (1882)

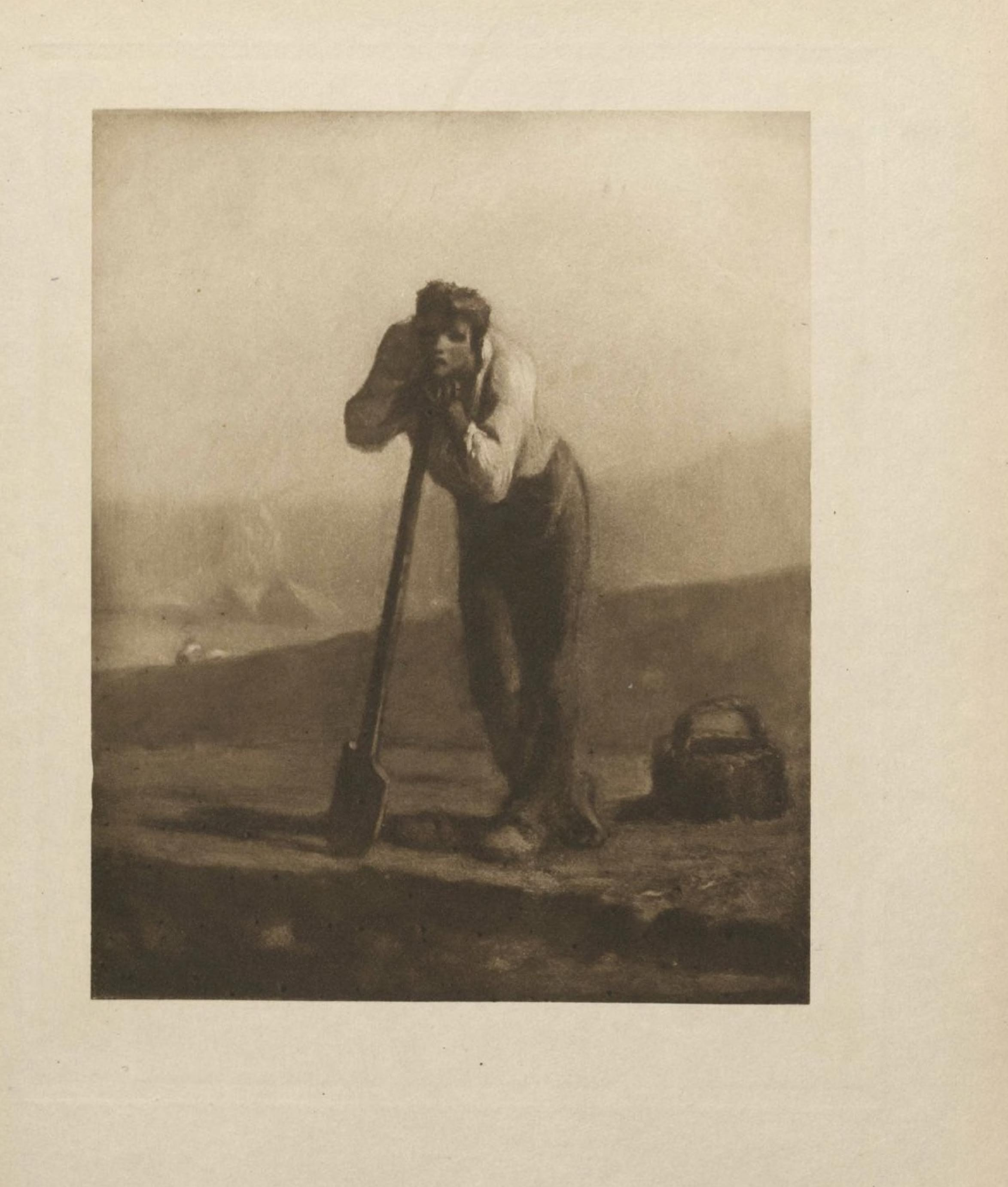
Laborer Resting, by Jean-François Millet (II) (1910)

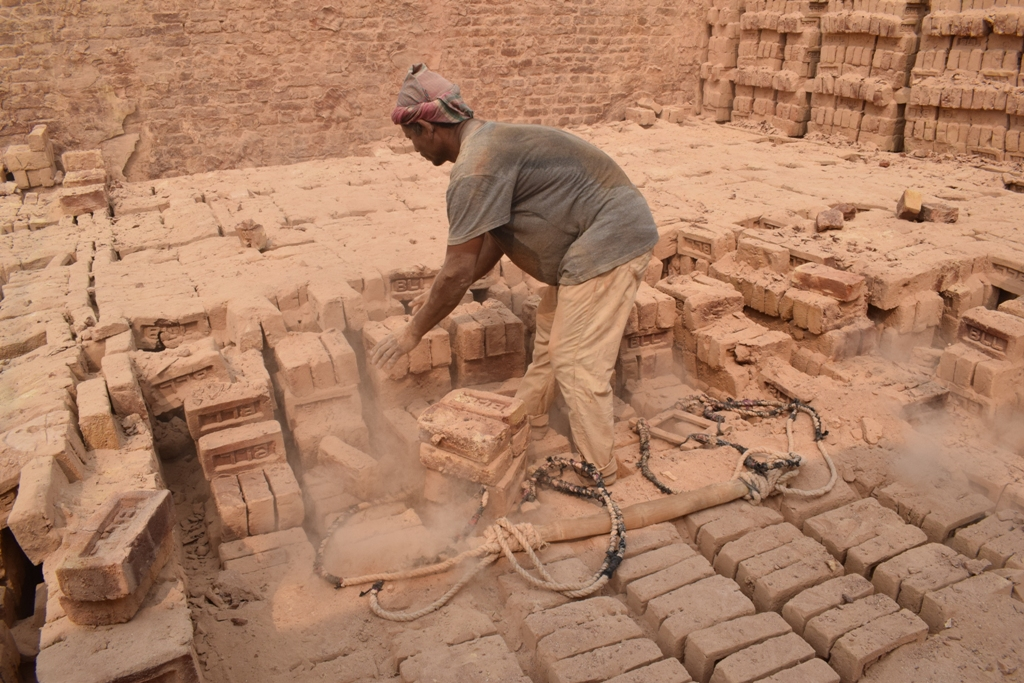
Laborer at a brick kiln (2018)

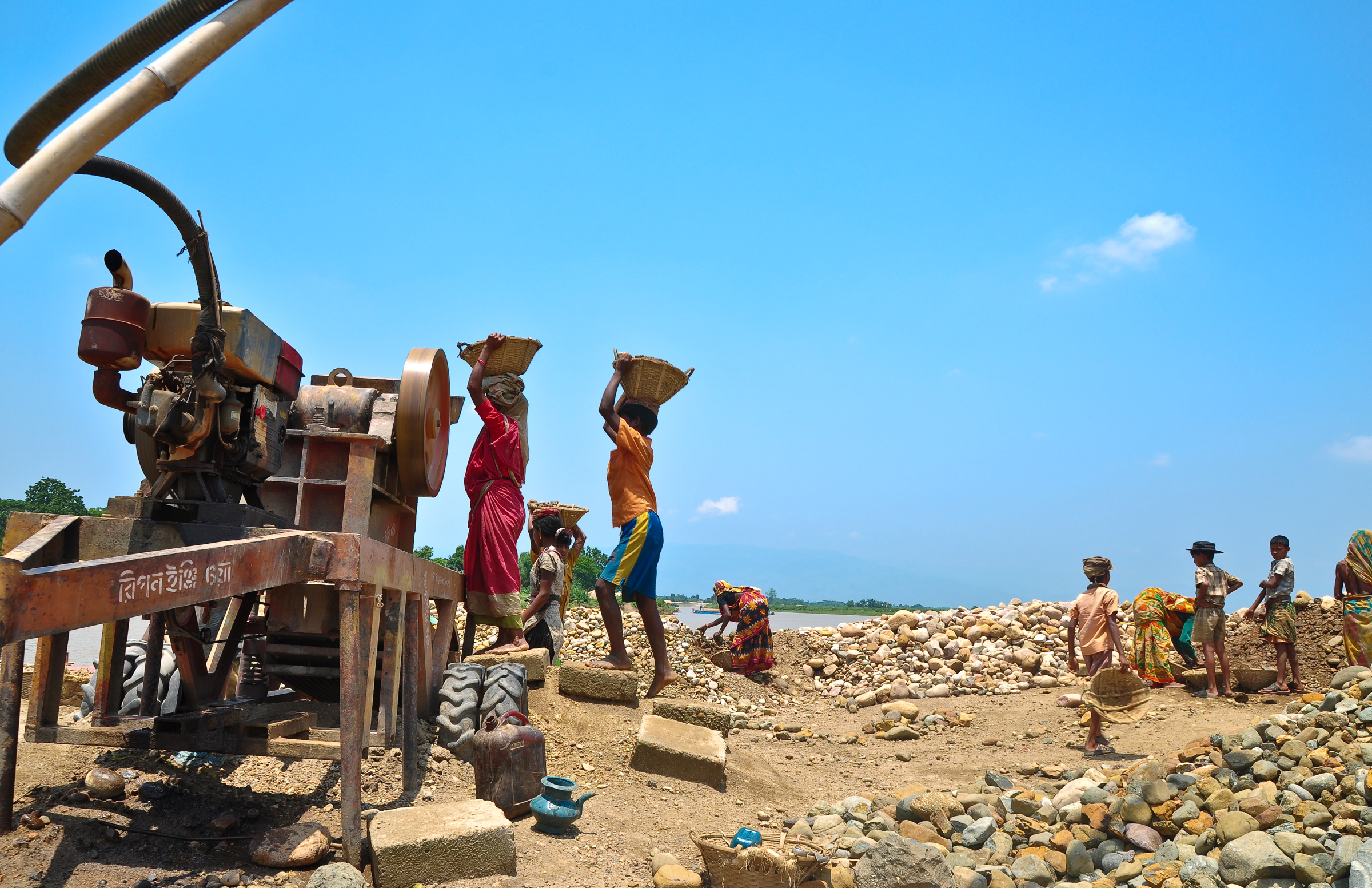
Child laborers (2011)

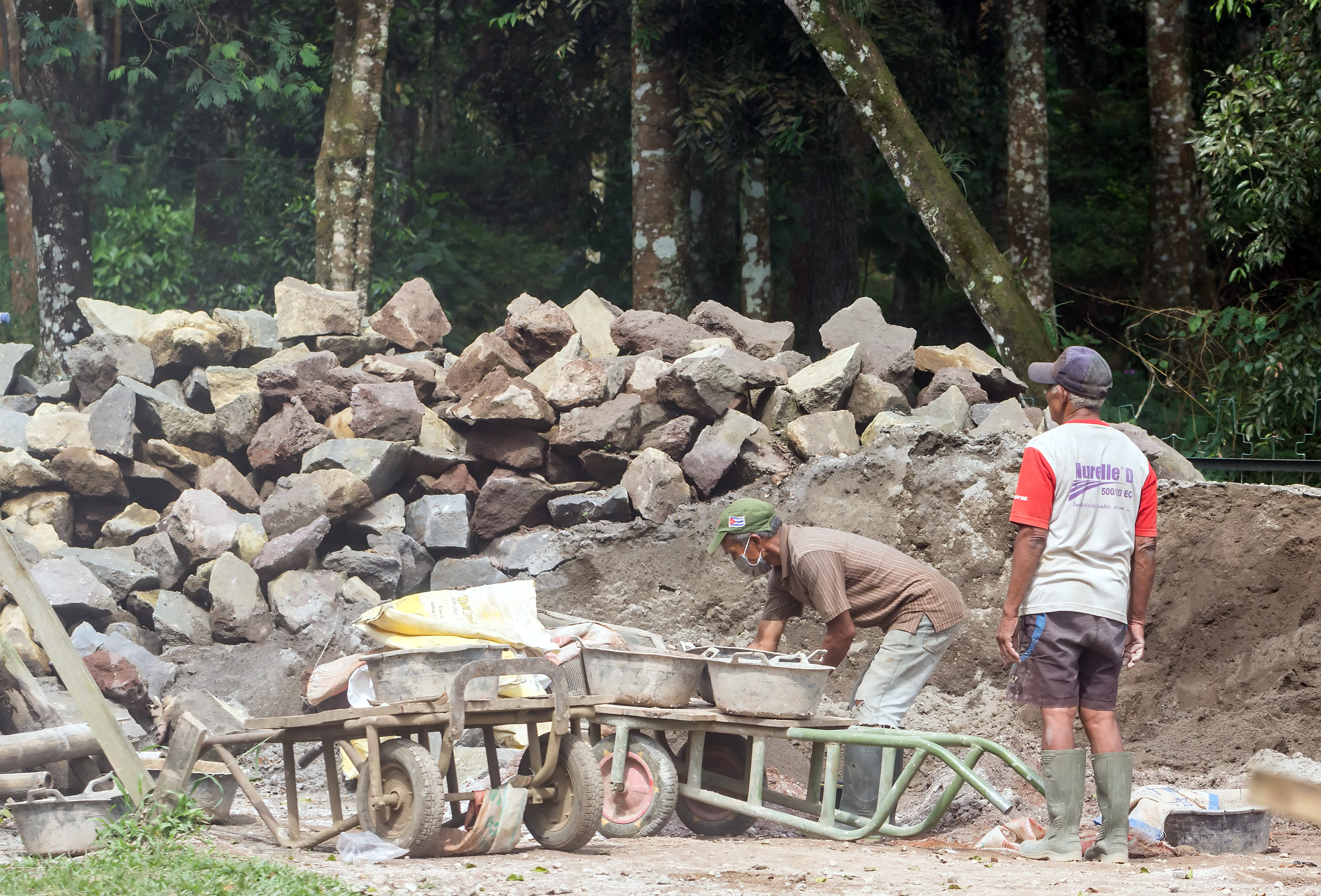
Laborers (2016)

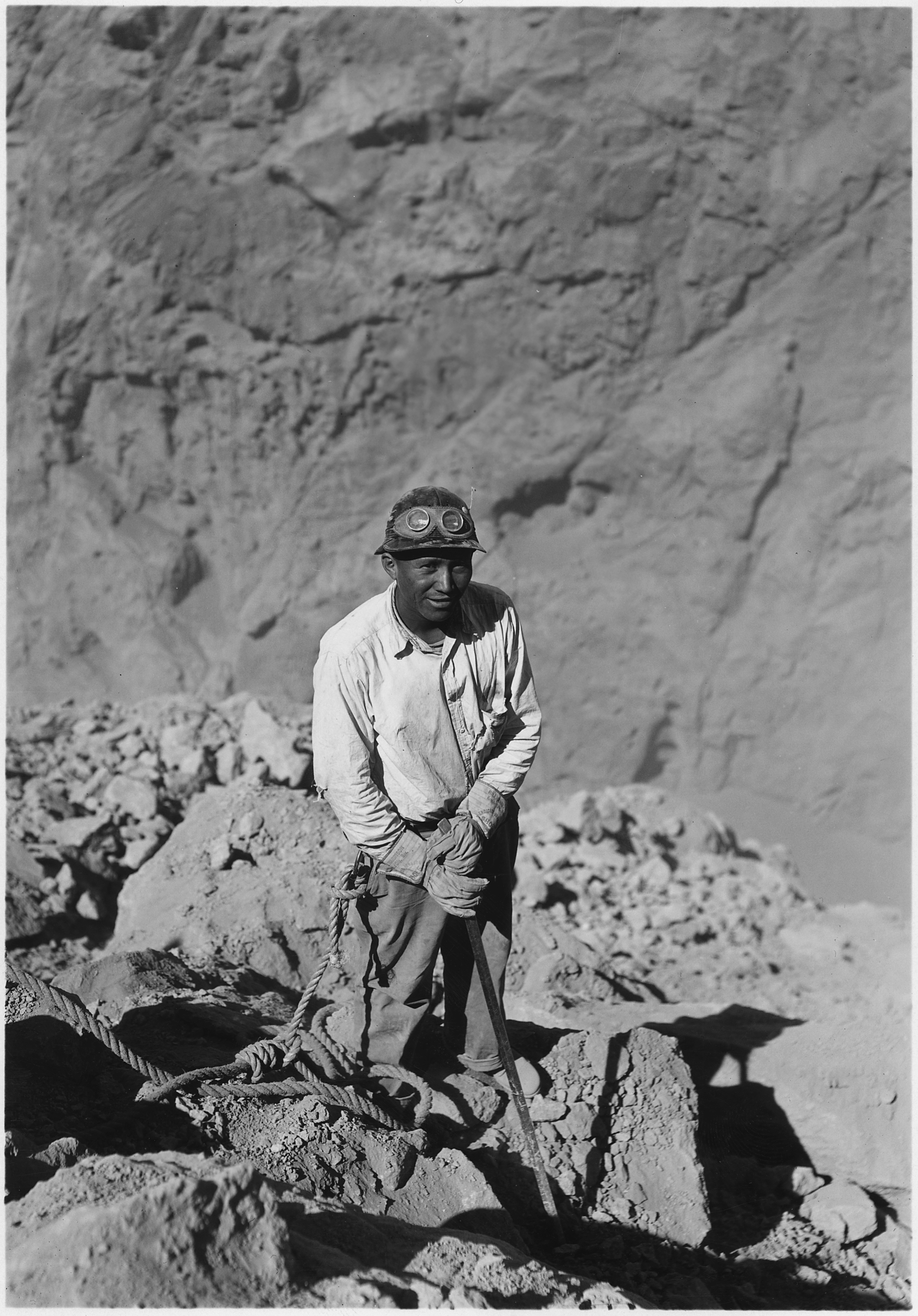
Boulder Dam project (1935)

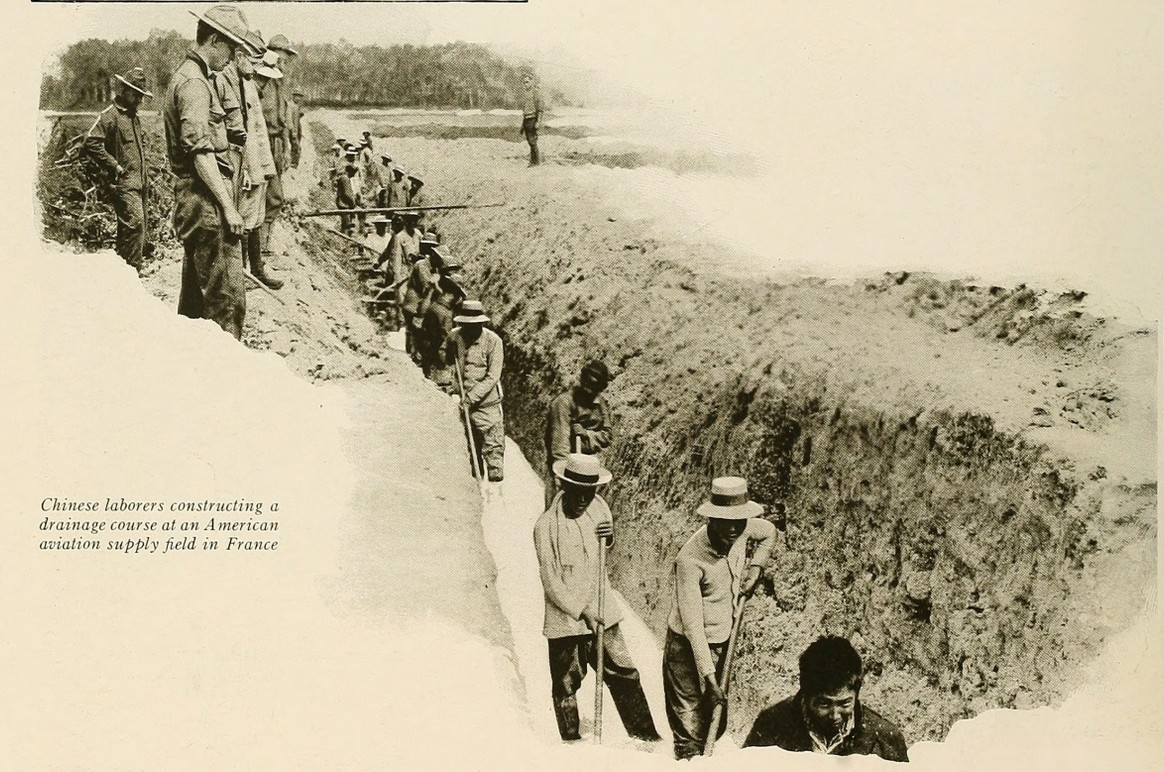
Laborers at an American aviation field in France (1919)

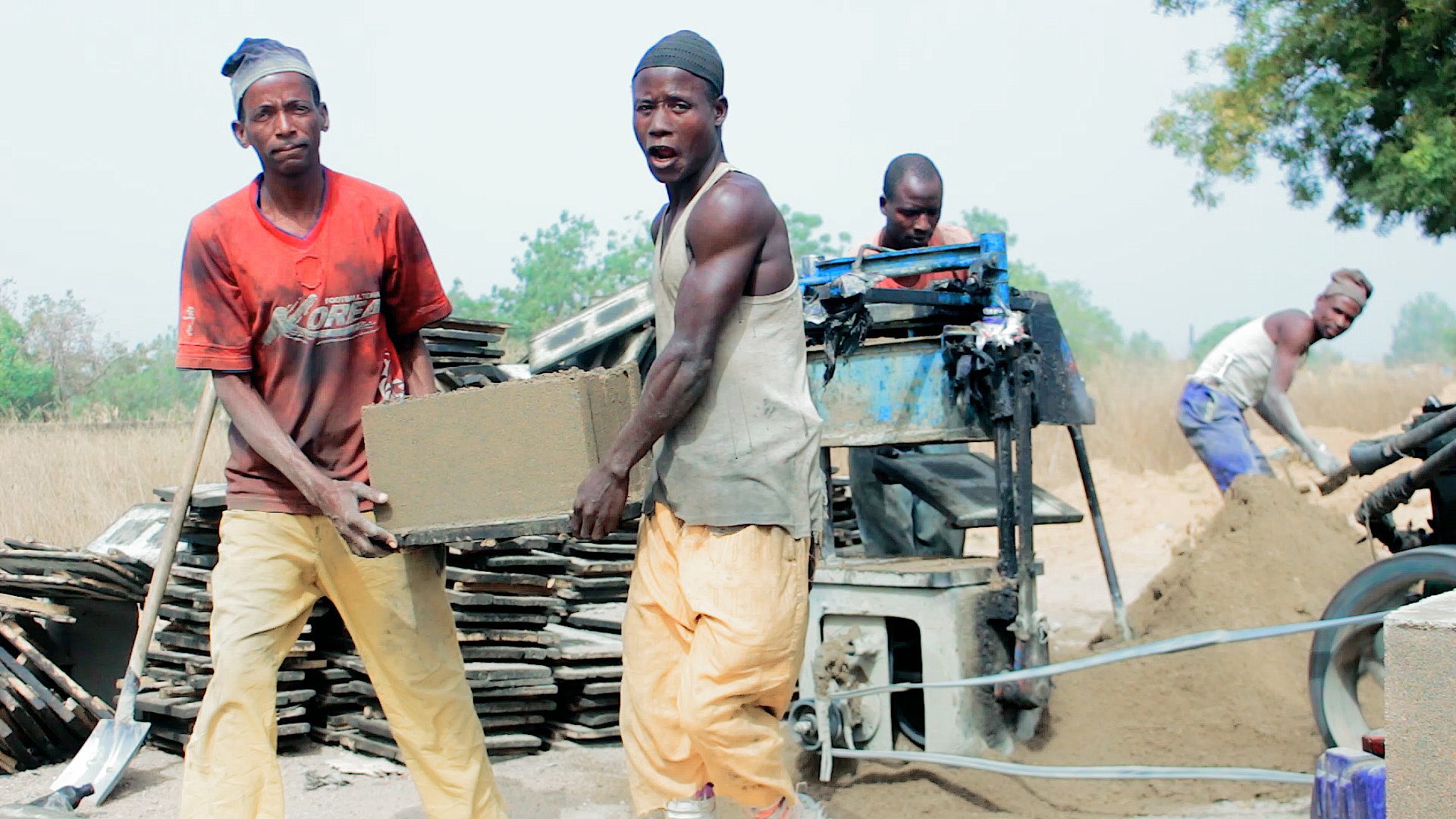
Fab-yard laborers at a fab plant (2017)

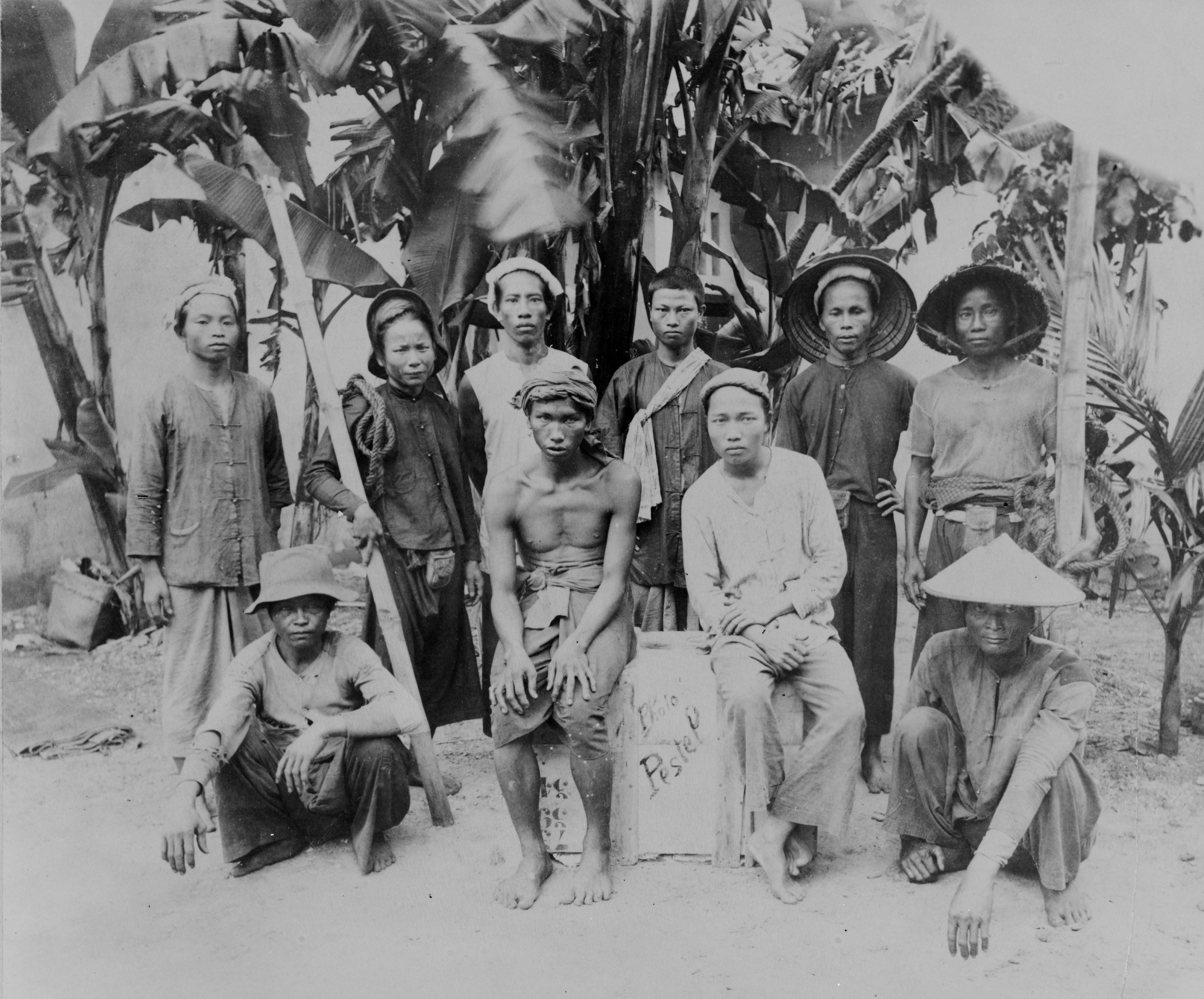
Laborer crew (early 1900s)

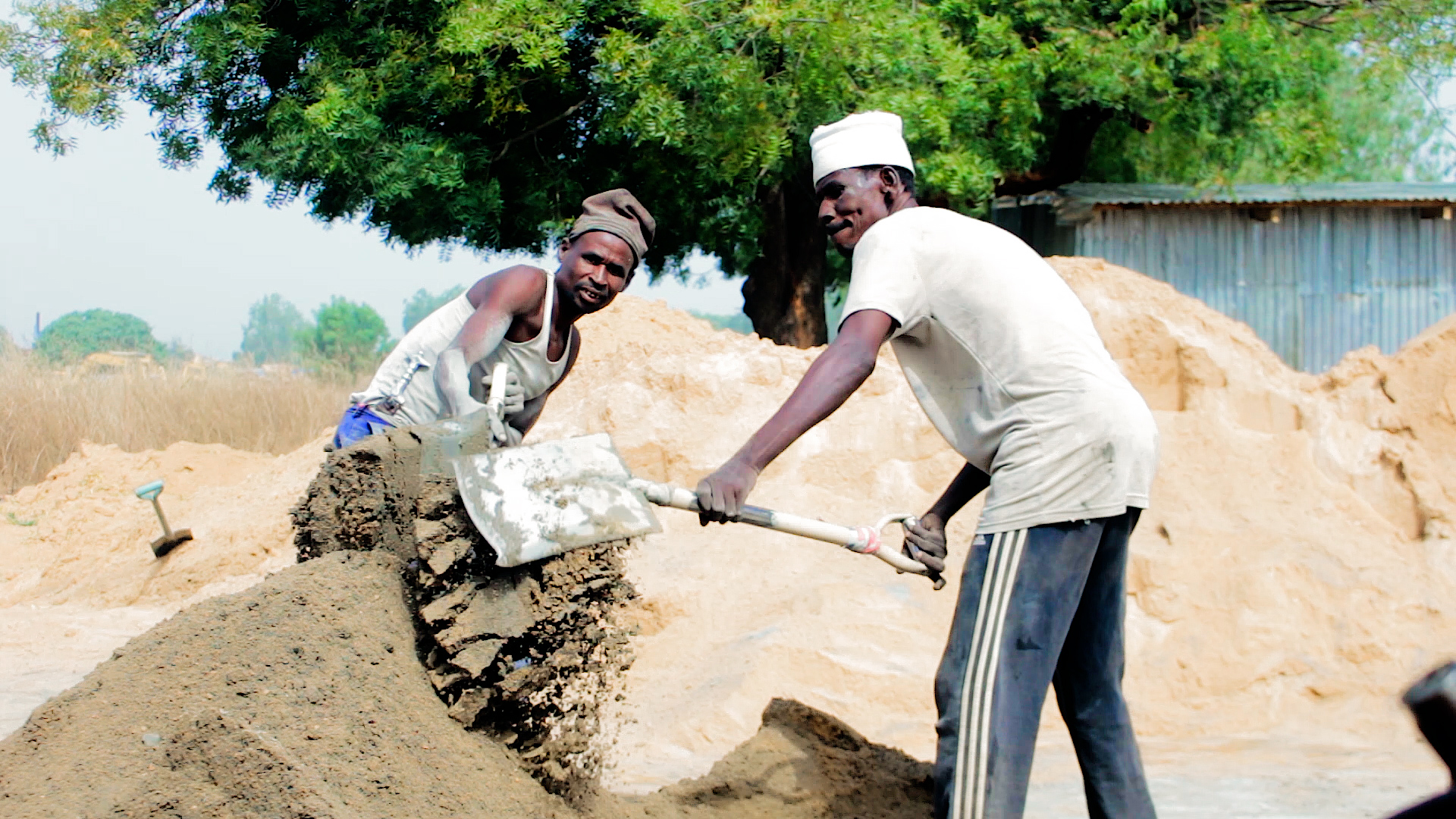
Fab-yard laborers (2017)

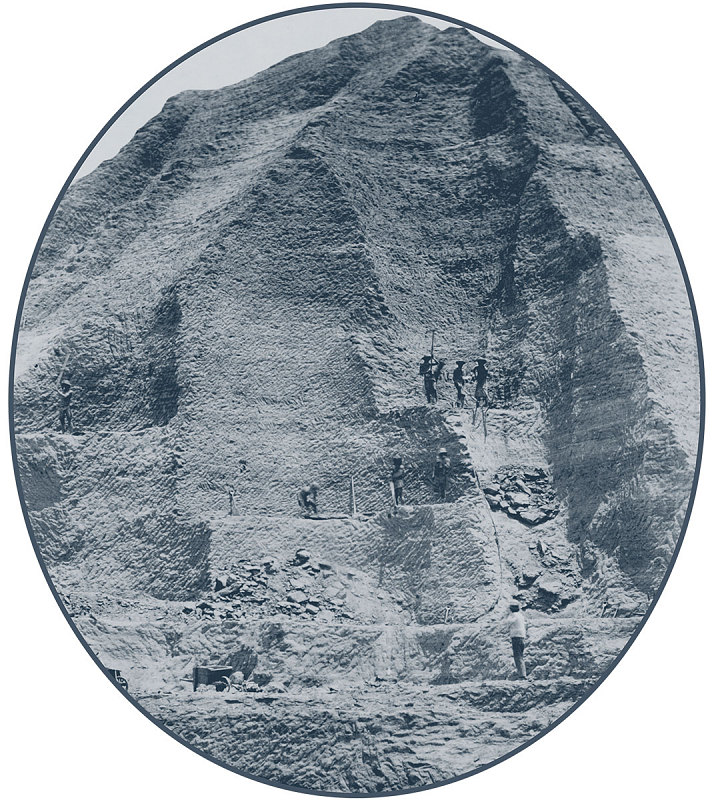
Guano laborers (bird guano was used for munitions) (1865)

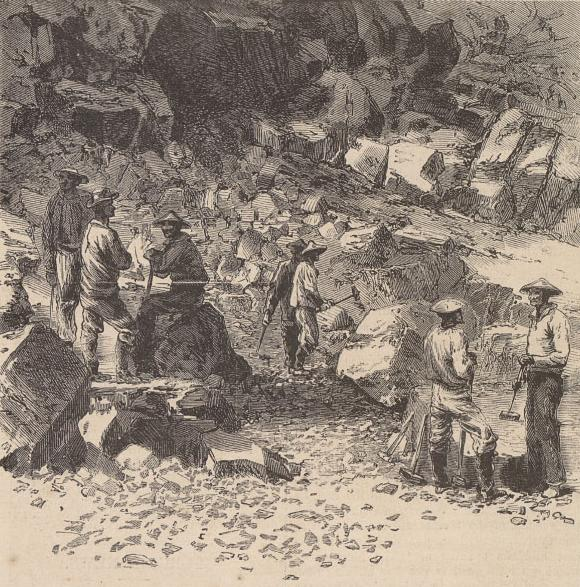
Central Pacific Railroad laborers (1867)

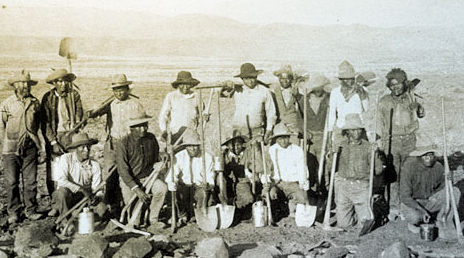
Laborer crew (1906)

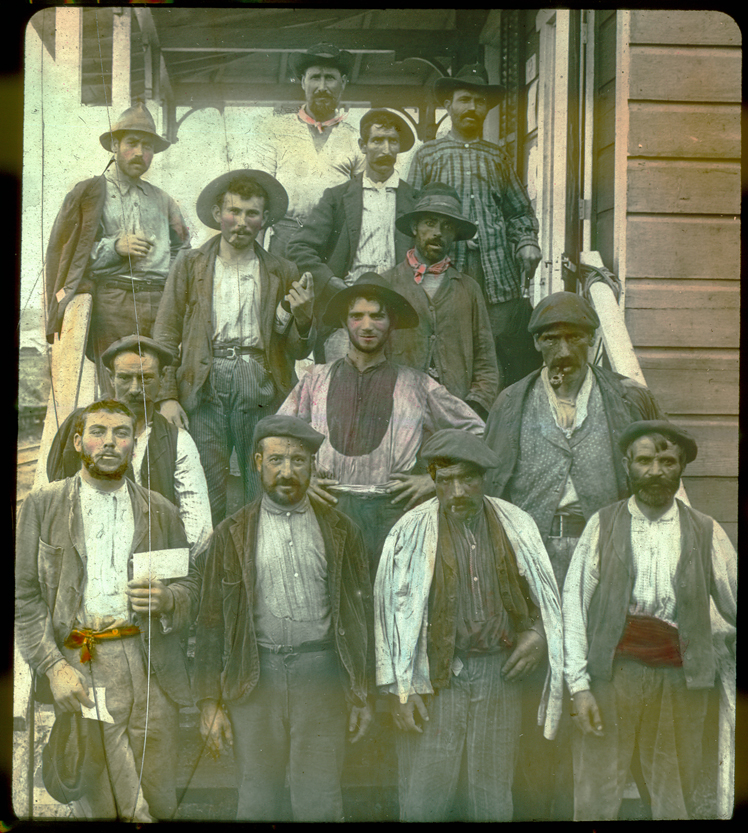
Laborers (early 1900s)

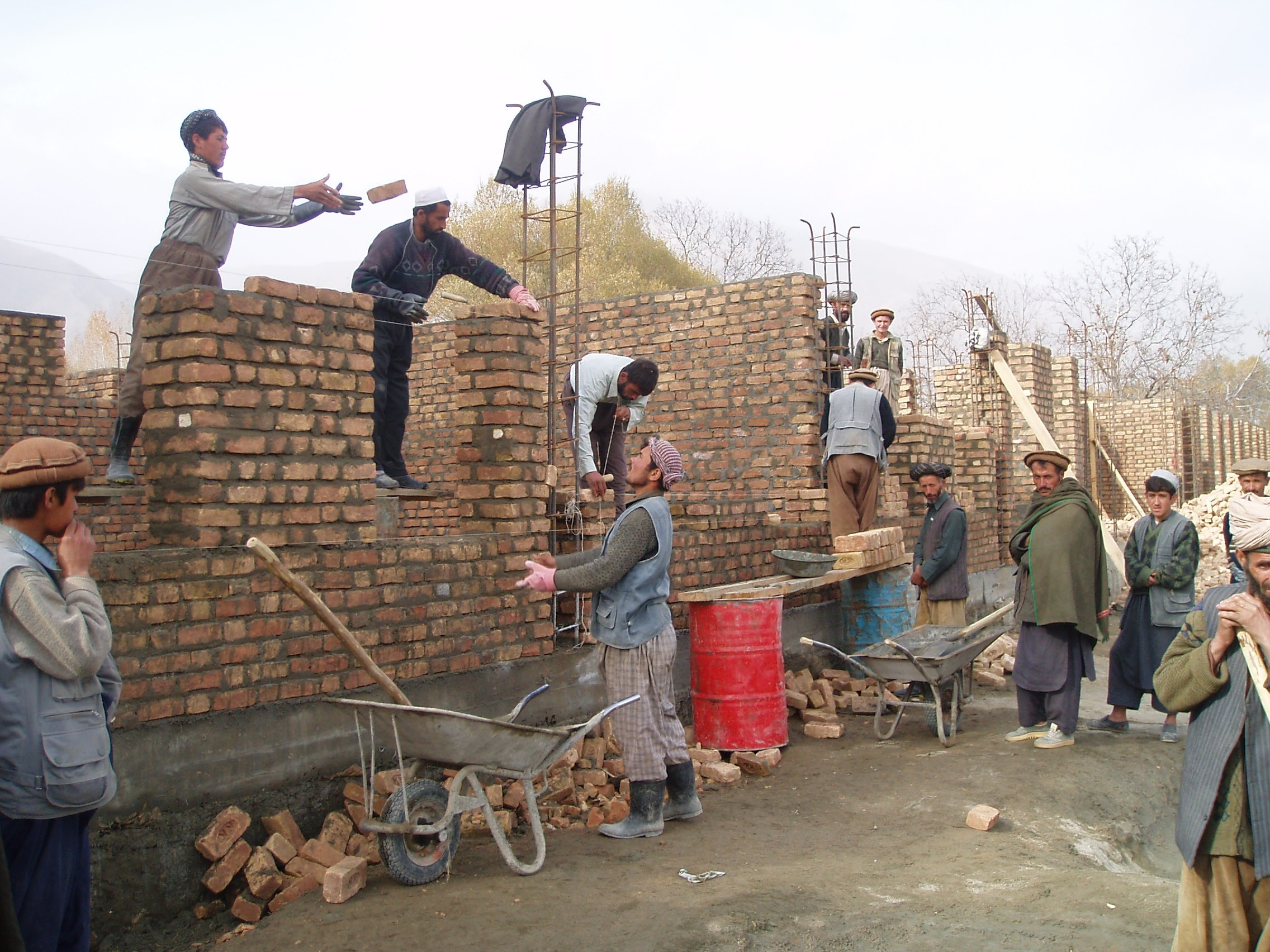
Laborers (early 2005)

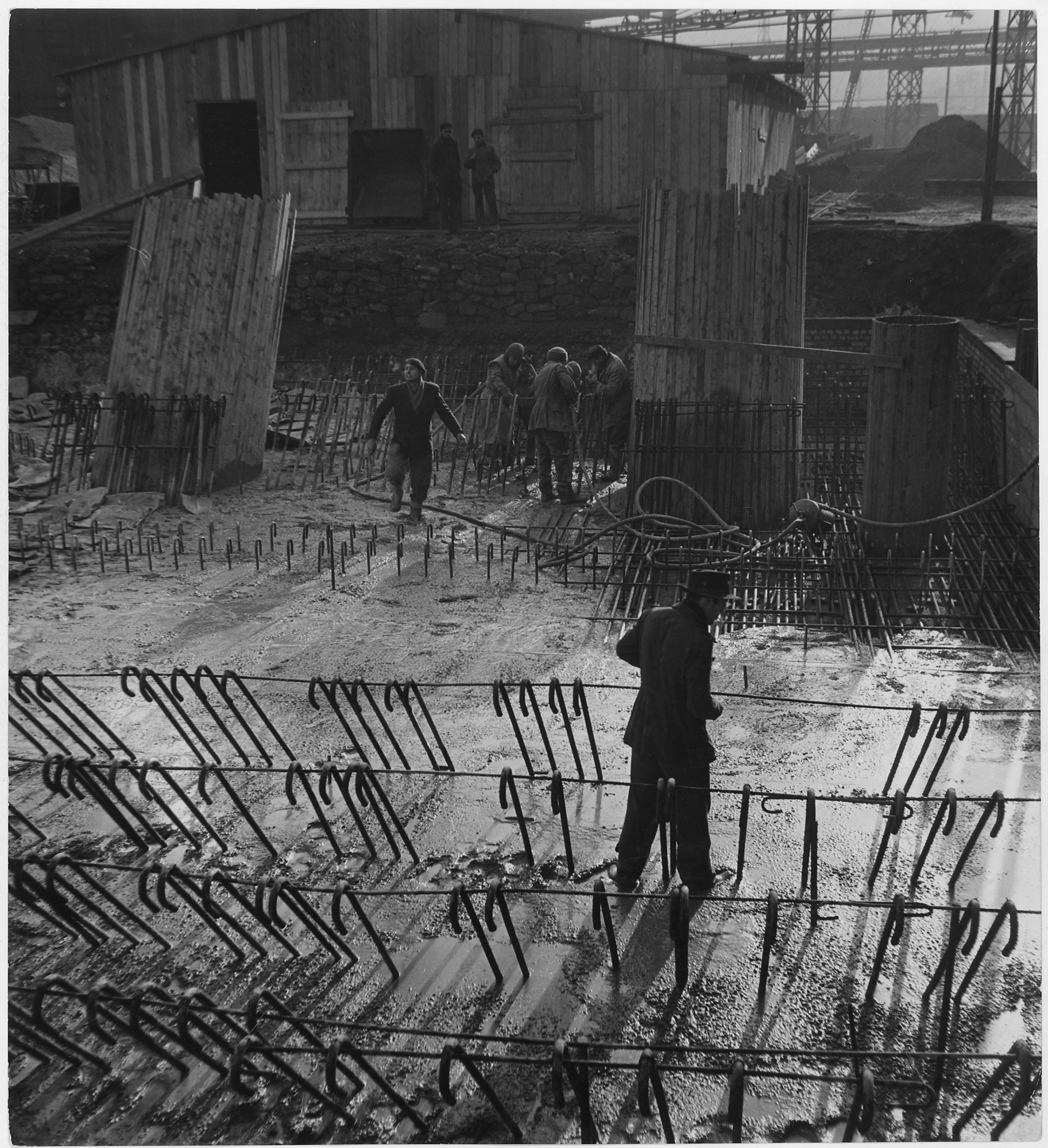
Concrete laborers (early 1950s)

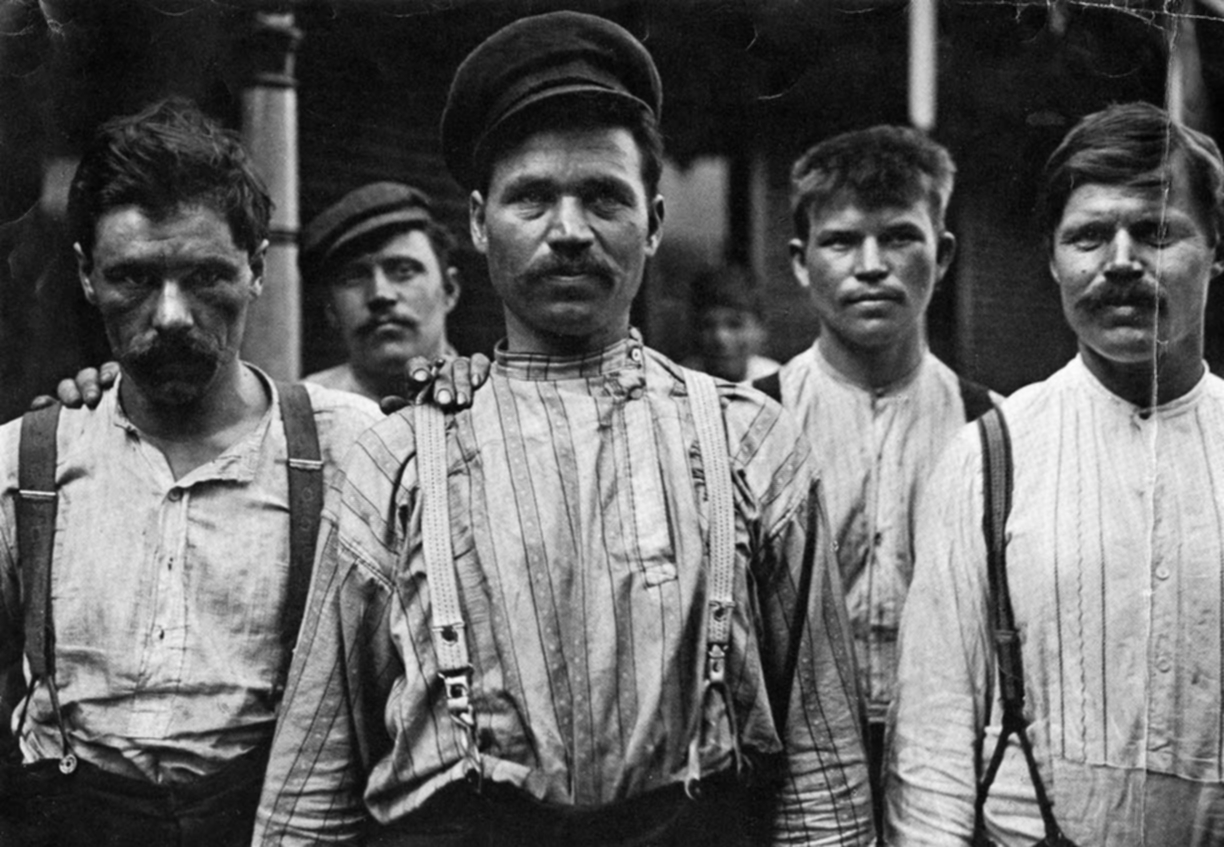
Pre-communist revolution laborers in Russia (1909)

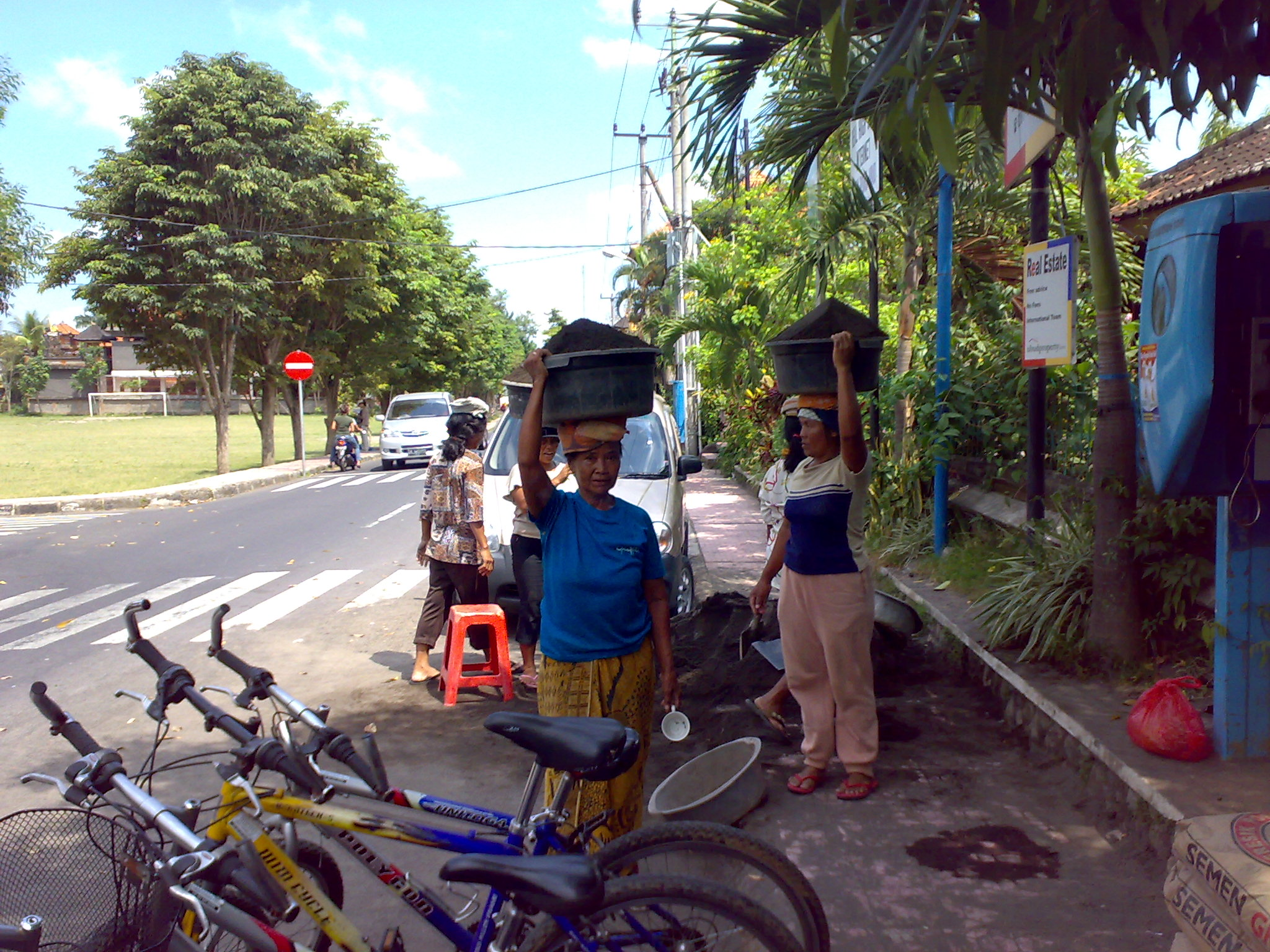
Laborers (2008)

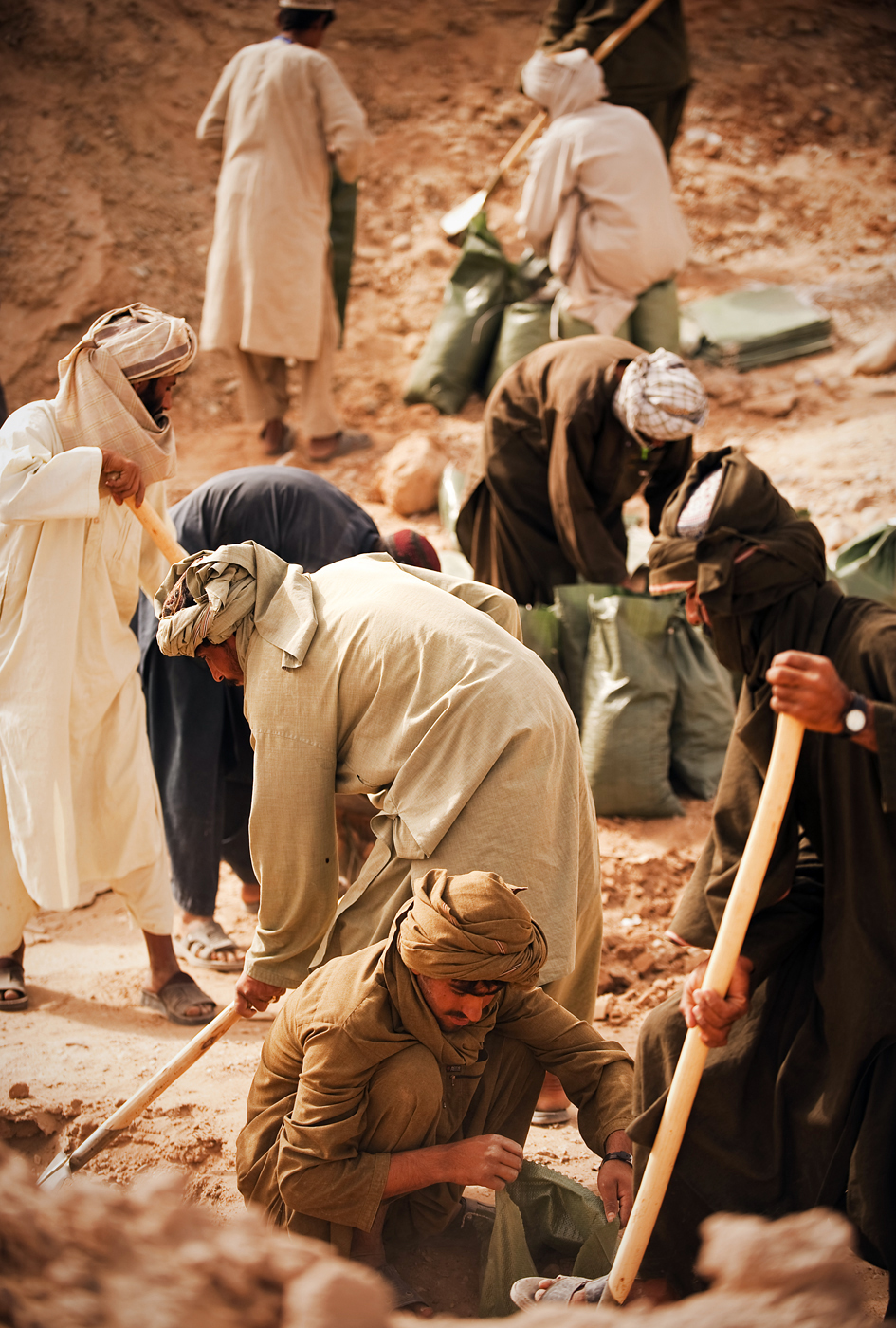
Laborers (2010)

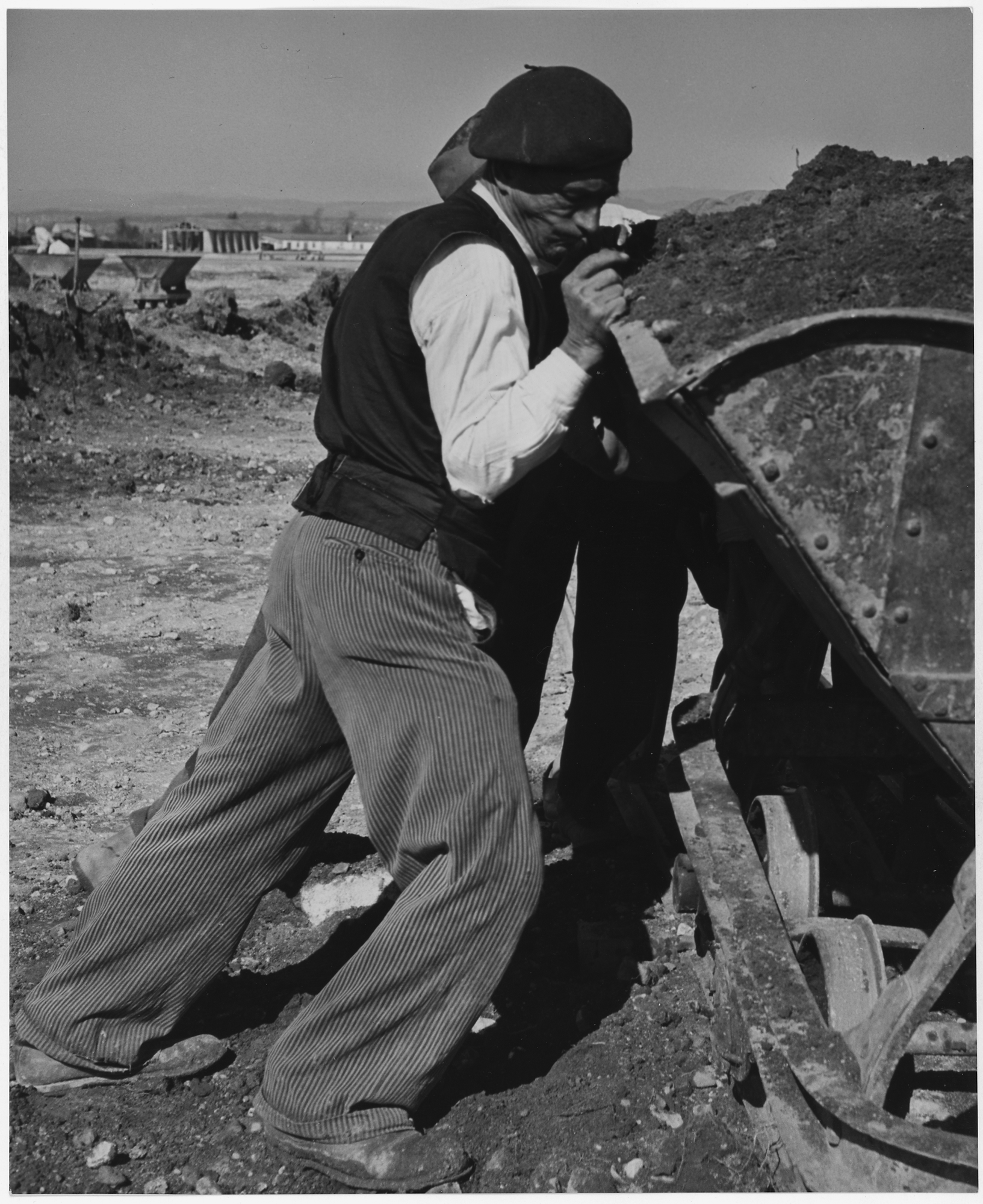
Laborers (late 1940s)

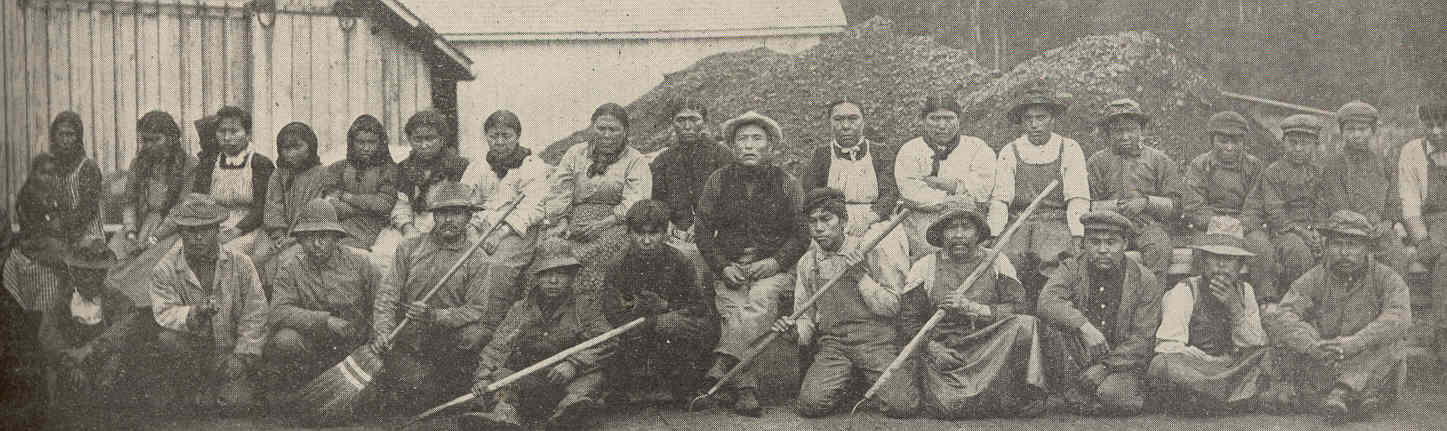
Laborers (1908)

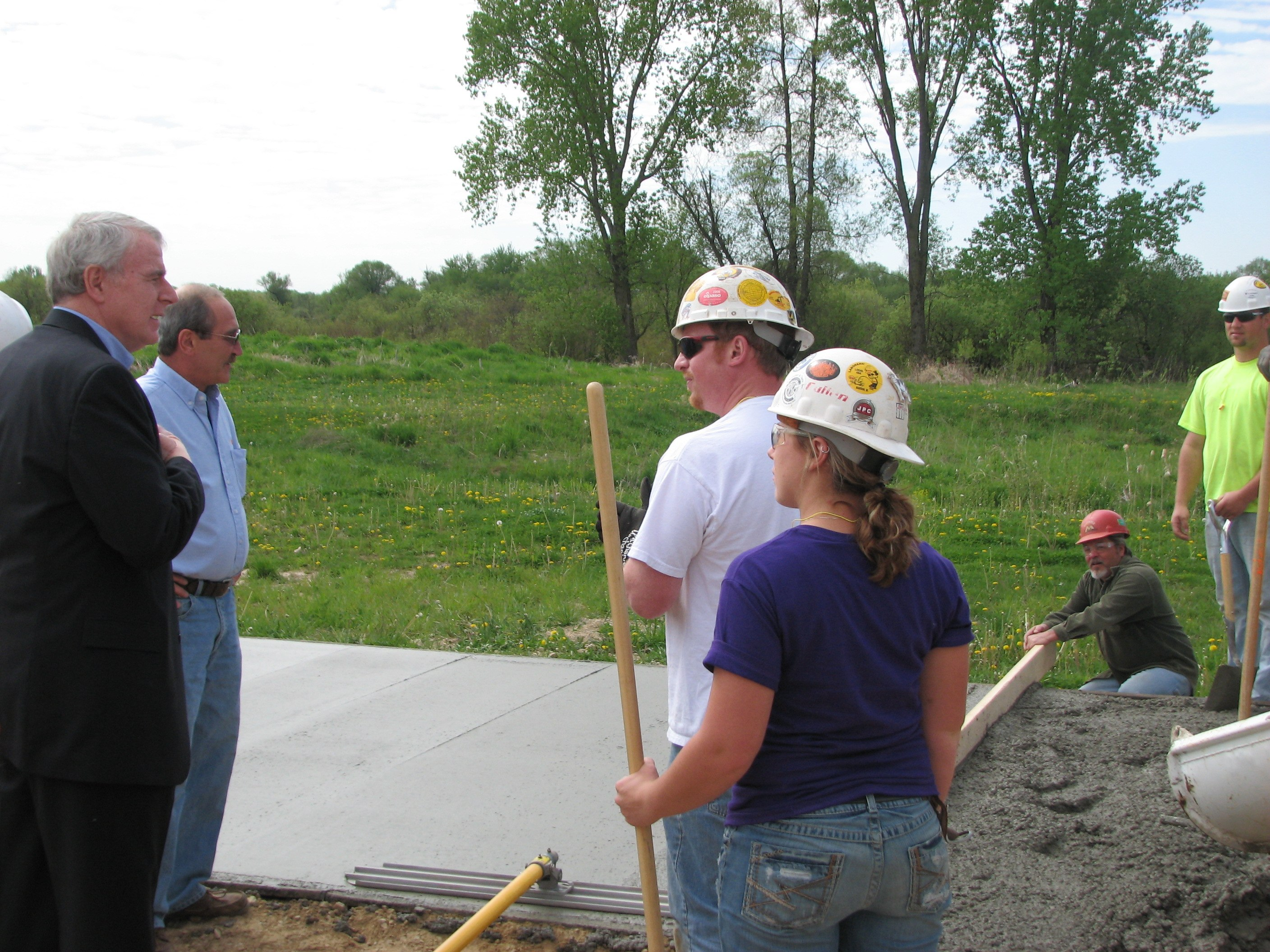
Unionized concrete road laborers (2010)

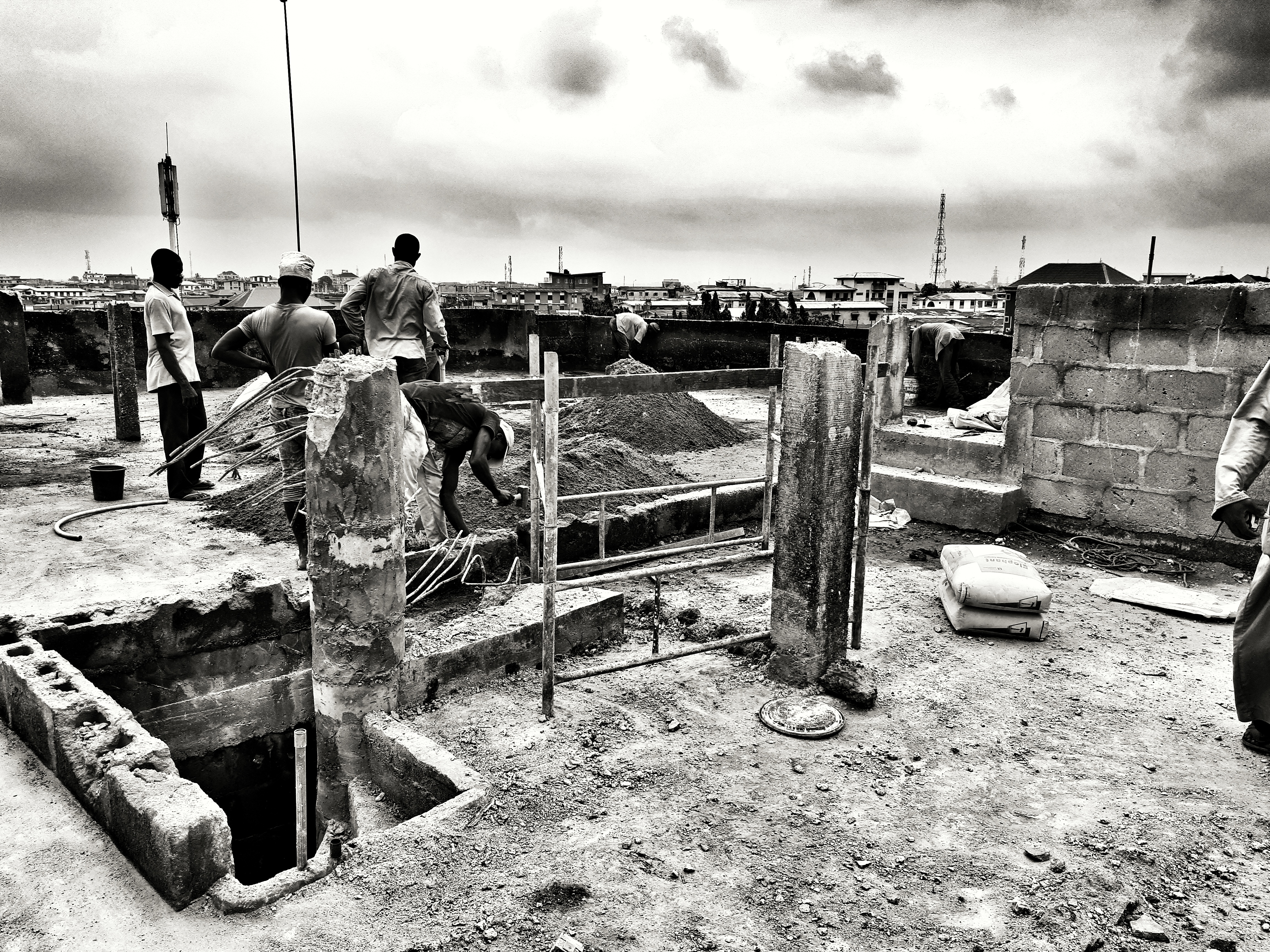
Building laborer crew (2017)

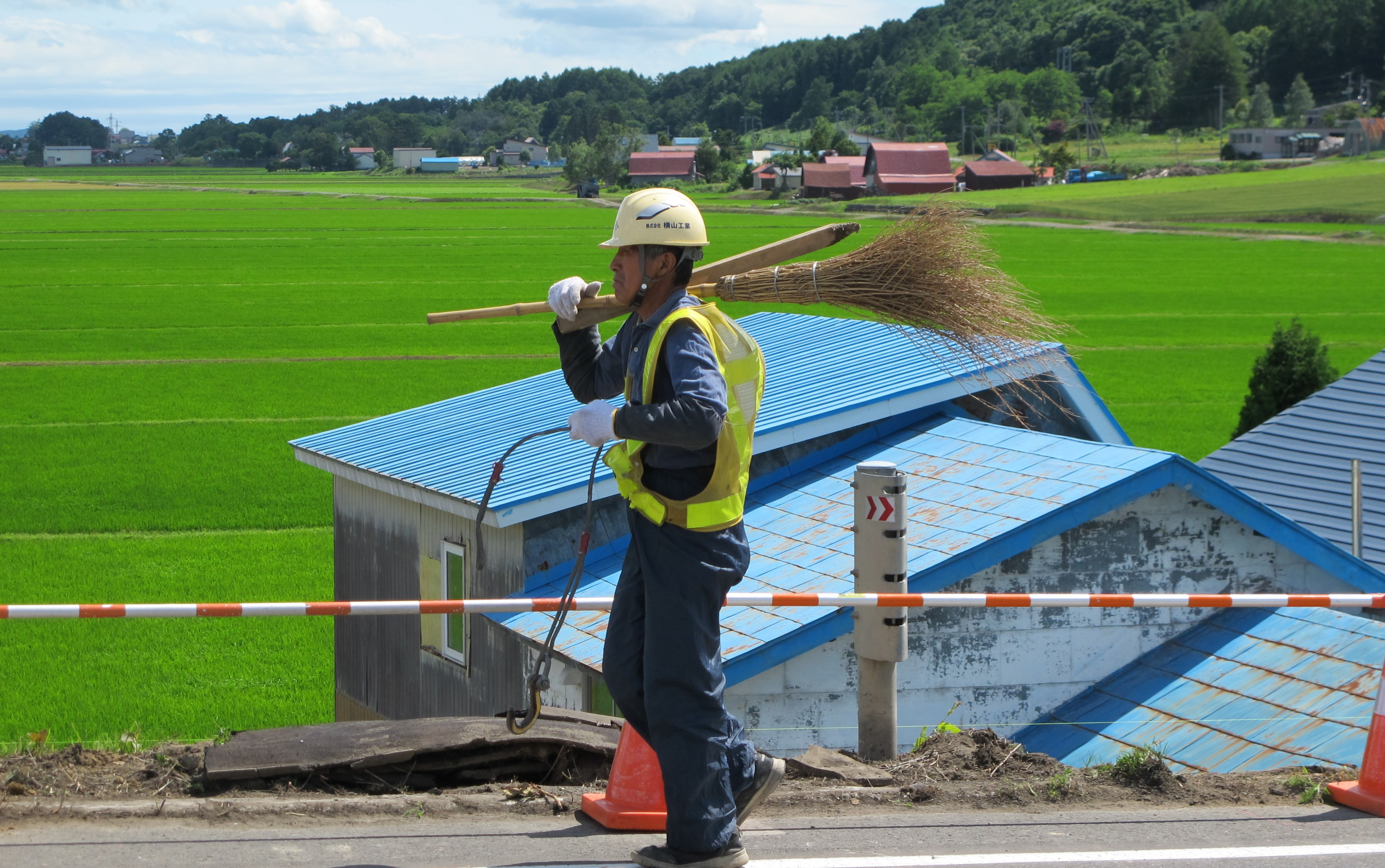
Road maintenance worker in Hokkaido Japan (2012)

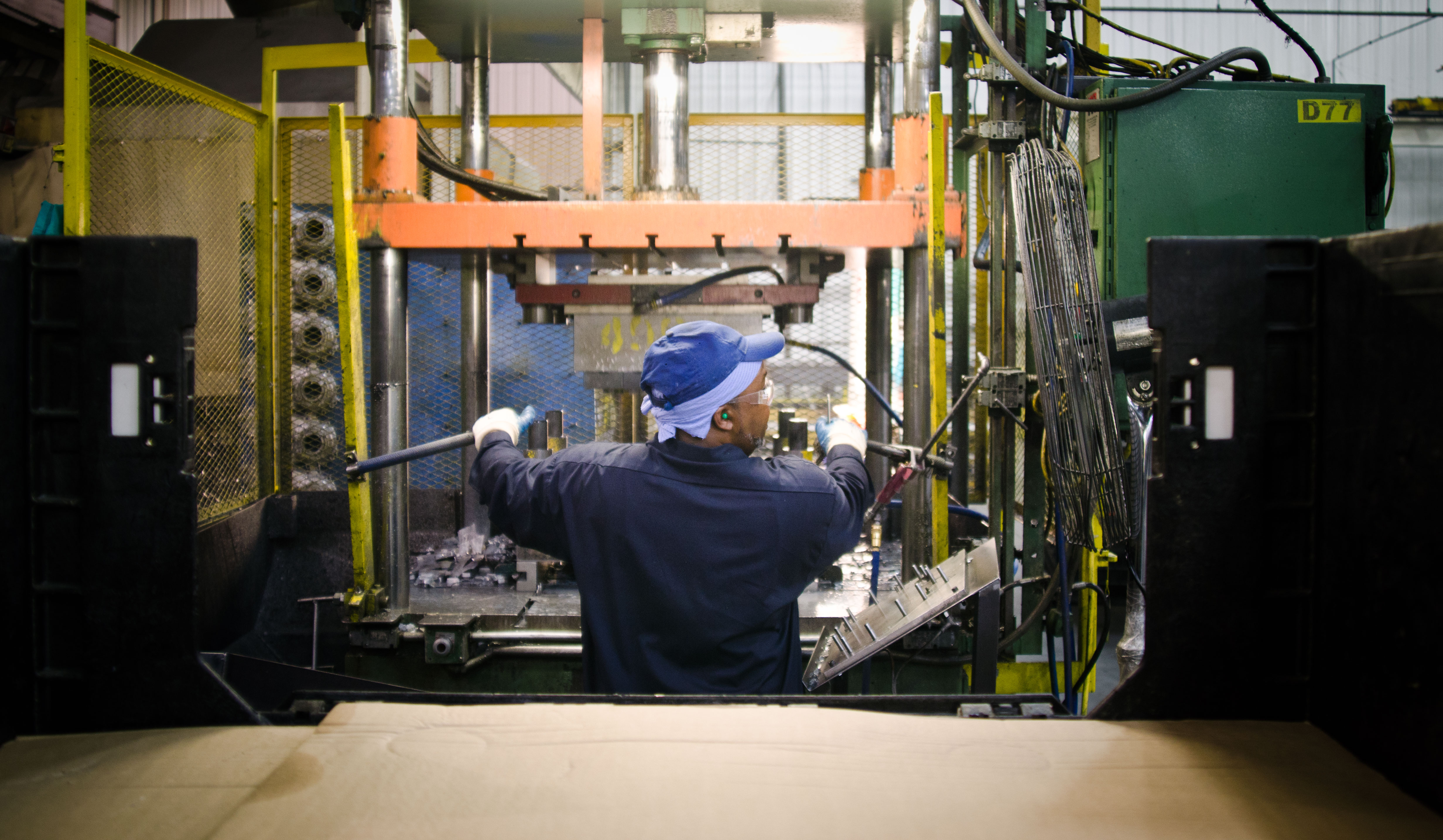
Trim Operator Roger Brown uses robotic presses and computer-controlled machines to produce high-pressure aluminum die-cast automotive components at Port City Group in Muskegon, Michigan.

== See also ==
- Hard hat, nickname for construction workers
- Navvy, particularly applied to describe the manual laborers working on British major civil engineering projects
- Working class
- Tradesman
