= Khurpa =

Gardening tool

A khurpa (alternatively called a khurpi) is a short-handled cutting tool similar to a Trowel with a flat blade used for digging soil and weeding in small gardens or vegetable farms. It is commonly used in small farms, ridges, or rows of vegetables to hoewing or earth up the weeds. It is traditionally used while in a squatting posture. The work khurpa is a word in the Punjabi language.

The khurpa is used in Punjab (as well as in other areas in India) for small-scale gardening processes such as bed preparation, digging, tilling, and weeding. It is an Indian weeding tool.
