= Putty knife =

Hand tool

Putty knife used for glazing windows

Two flexible-blade knives, 4" and 5"

A putty knife is a specialized tool used when glazing single glazed windows, to work putty around the edges of each pane of glass. Putty is often applied by hand, then smoothed with the knife. Modern insulated glazing may use other ways of securing the glass to the window frame.

A spackle knife (called a scraper in British English, also known as a spatula in American English) is also commonly called a "putty knife", and is used for scraping surfaces or spreading material such as plaster in various construction trades. Widths from 1 1/4" to 5" or 6" are commonly available. Wider-bladed knives up to about 12" are used for sheet rocking. Larger blades are made, but generally lack the stability of the smaller blades and do not make a perfectly flat surface.

Stiff-blade knives, typically 1 mm or .040" thick, are suitable for scraping. Flexible-blade knives, typically 0.5 mm or .020" thick, are suitable for spreading. Due to the conductive nature of metallic blades, they should be kept at a safe distance from electrical components.

Disposable knives, with handle and blade molded as a single piece of plastic, are suitable for occasional jobs such as spreading roof patching tar or mixing two-part adhesives, avoiding laborious cleanup which may involve hazardous solvents.

== See also ==
- Taping knife
- Trowel
- Ulu
