= William Hunt and Sons =

British masonry tools brand

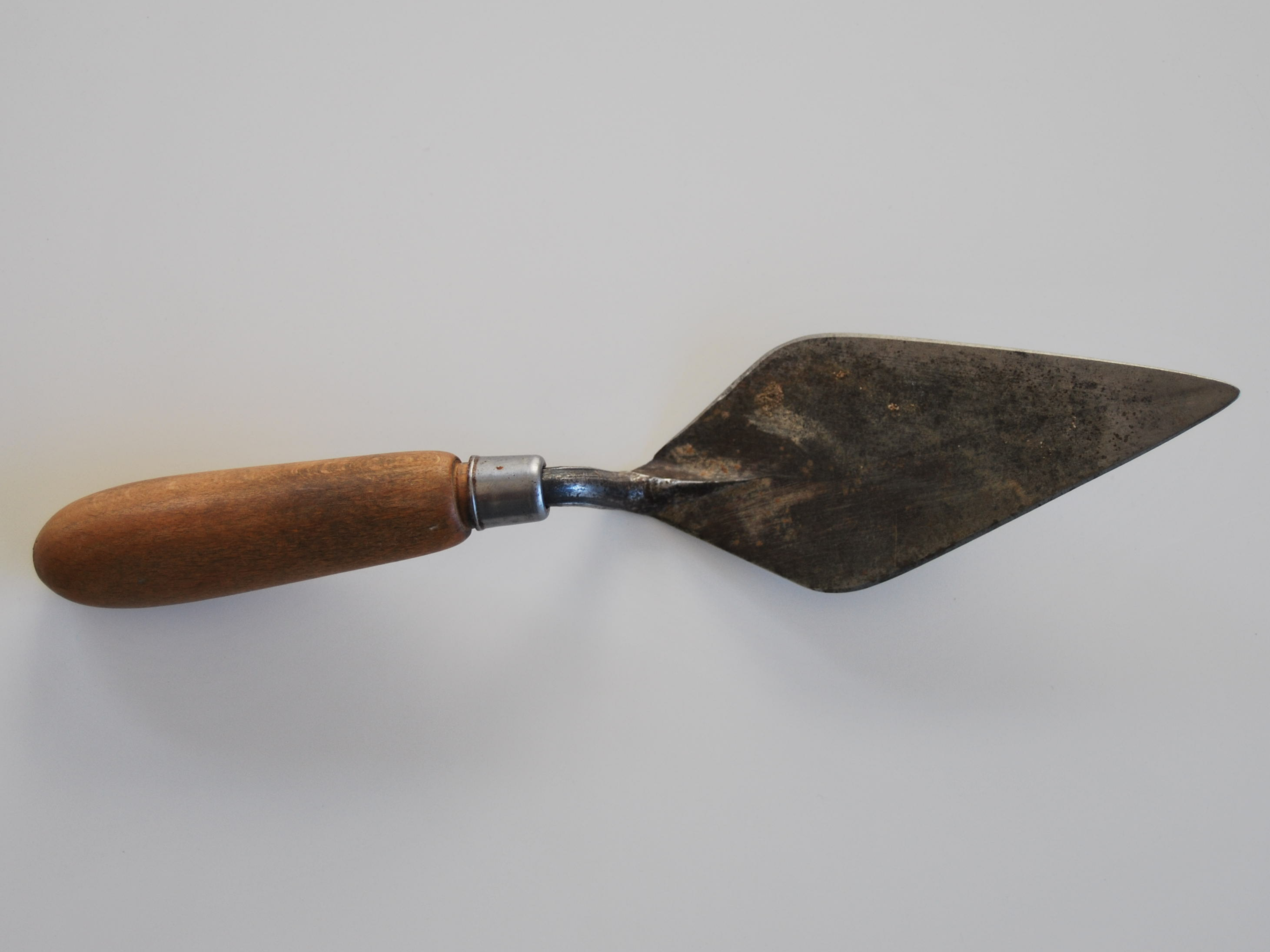
WHS 4" pointing trowel

William Hunt and Sons or WHS is a British brand of masonry tools and other types of edge tools. The WHS 4" pointing trowel is well known as a standard excavation implement in British archaeology.

== History ==
The founder of the company, William Hunt, was an edge tool maker at Rowley Regis, near Dudley, Worcestershire, in the late 18th century. In 1782 he purchased the Brades Estate at Oldbury, near Birmingham, and established a new works there known as Brades Forge, or simply as The Brades. By 1805 they were also manufacturing steel on the site, which was now known as the Brades Steel Works. Around 1793, Hunt took W. Cliffe into partnership, and for a short period the firm was known as Hunt and Cliffe: this name appears in the company's first ledger, dated 9 May 1794. This partnership dissolved around 1803, and Hunt continued trading on his own account until 1809, when he took his sons into partnership and the firm became known as William Hunt & Sons.

In 1828 the company acquired William Edwards and Sons (incorporating the Eagle Edge Tool Company), and later the business of Bache Bros, spade makers of Churchill Forge, near Stourbridge. In the late 19th century George Heaton became a major shareholder in the company.

In 1951 the company amalgamated with Nash Tyzack to form Brades Nash Tyzack Industries, and later took over the business of Skelton. In 1962, together with Harrison, they became part of Spear & Jackson, who in 1967 also acquired Edward Elwell Ltd, all the companies coming together as parts of S&J by 1972. In 1985 S&J became part of the Neill Tools Group based in Sheffield, who still own the brand today.

== Brands ==
The company's major UK trade marks were BRADES and WHS, but they had many others, some of which, such as Eagle, Giraffe and Pagoda, were only used on tools made for export.

== Archaeological trowels ==
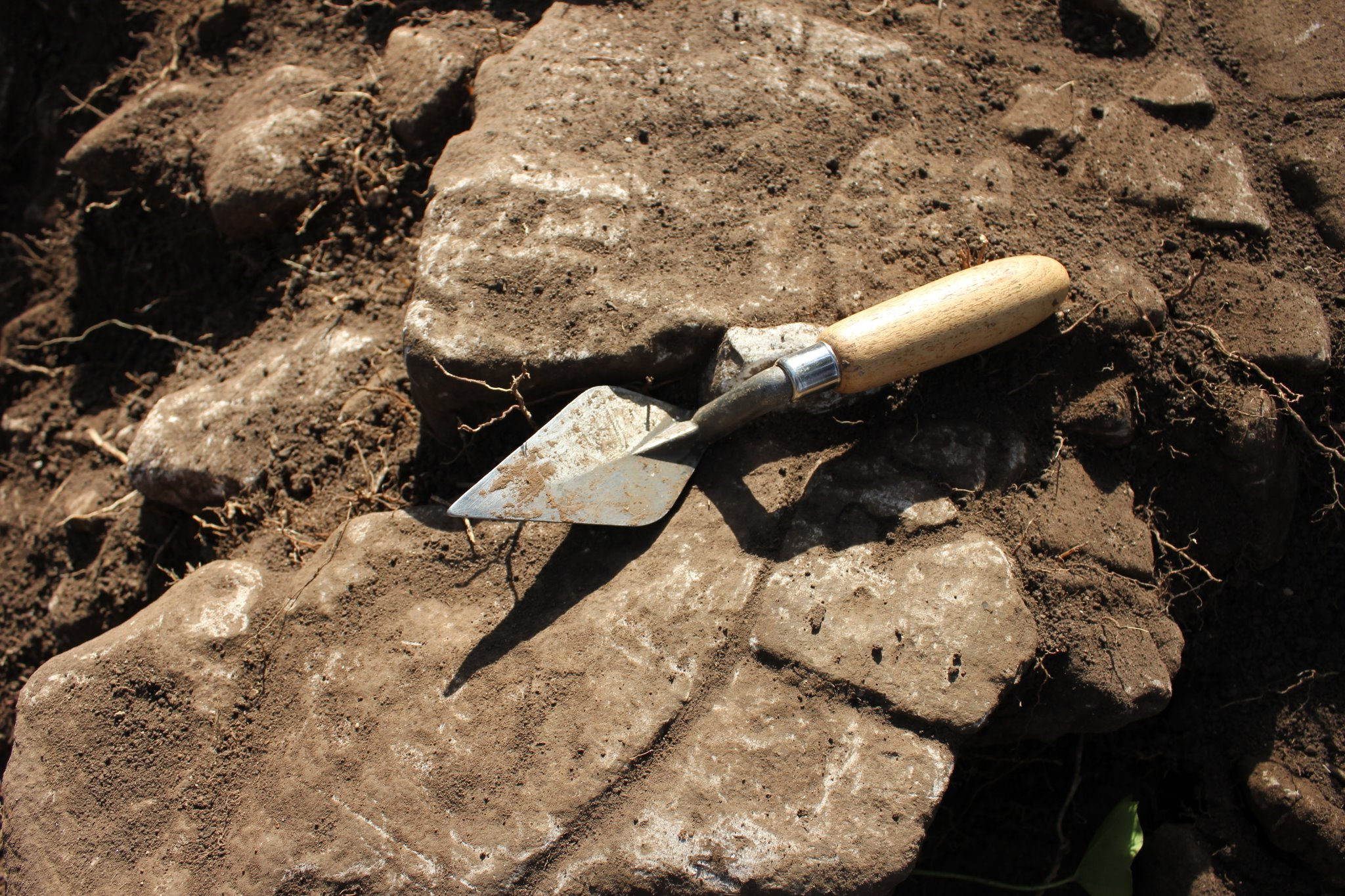
A WHS trowel

The WHS pointing trowel is prized amongst archaeologists in the United Kingdom who find its strength useful in digging heavy deposits. In his 1946 book Field Archaeology, Richard J. C. Atkinson (best known for excavating Stonehenge), "unequivocally" recommended the use of a trowel for archaeology; during the postwar era, WHS and a competing brand from Bowden were predominant. By 1960, archaeologist Paul Stamper was told that a WHS trowel was a "prerequisite", and by 1999, he deemed it the "industry standard". Current Archaeology summed up the choices:

There are really only two contenders on the single-forged blade market, WHS (UK) and Marshalltown (US). WHS blades are thicker, but consequently become blunt as they start to wear down. Marshalltown blades are sharp, flexible, and strong enough to deal with most types of soil.

In 2005, the company introduced a new version of its 4" WHS pointing trowel. The thinner and more brittle design was designed for the construction industry, and encountered resistance from archaeologists who found it inferior to its predecessor model. Oxford Archaeology indicated it might switch to the American-made Marshalltown trowel; and British Archaeological Jobs Resource received complaints of breakages on site. In response, in the summer of 2006, the firm launched a new trowel, marked "Archaeologists' Trowel" on the blade, the design of which took account of archaeologists' concerns and the results of field trials. It incorporated a thicker, stronger blade, higher lift for extra knuckle clearance, and a flattened tang to prevent handle rotation.
