= Trowel =

Hand tool

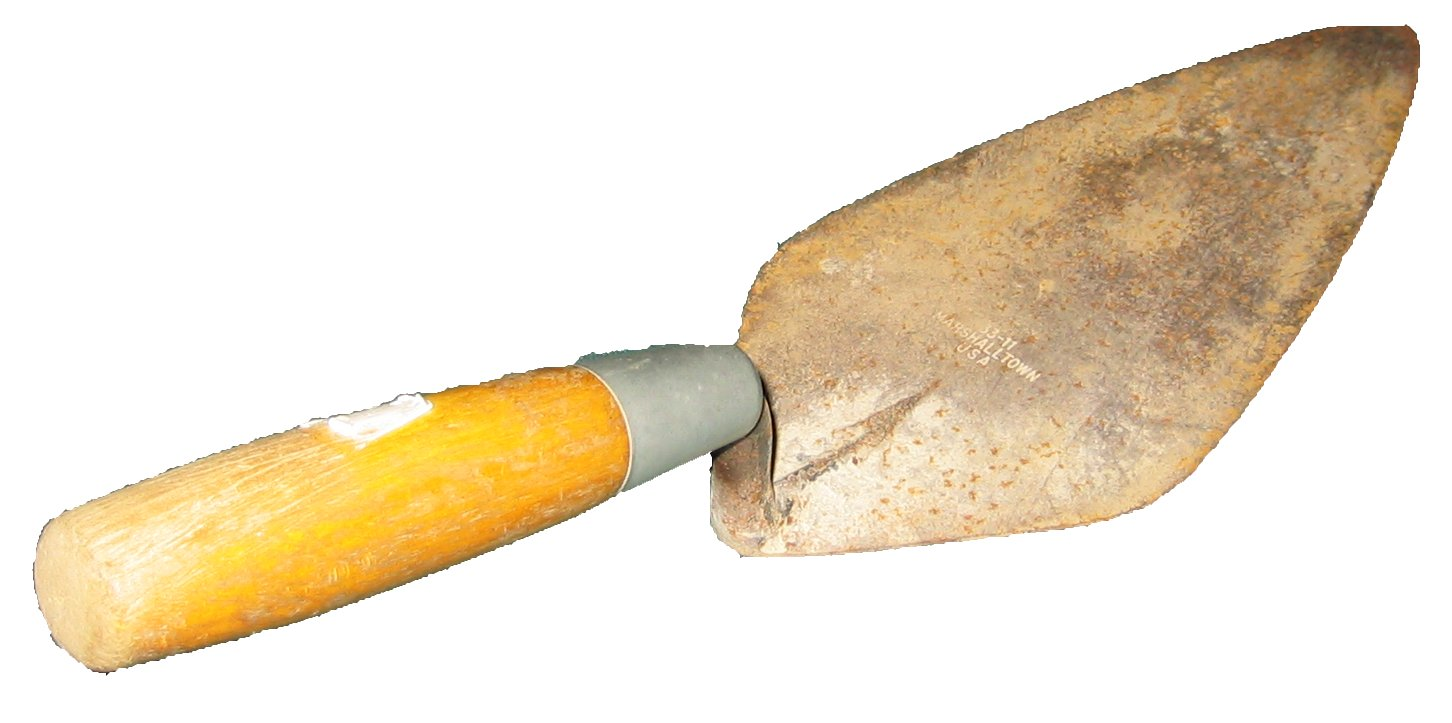
Masonry trowel

A trowel is a small hand tool used for digging, applying, smoothing, or moving small amounts of viscous or particulate material. Common varieties include the masonry trowel, garden trowel, and float trowel.

A power trowel is a much larger gasoline or electrically powered walk-behind device with rotating paddles used to finish concrete floors.

== Hand trowel ==
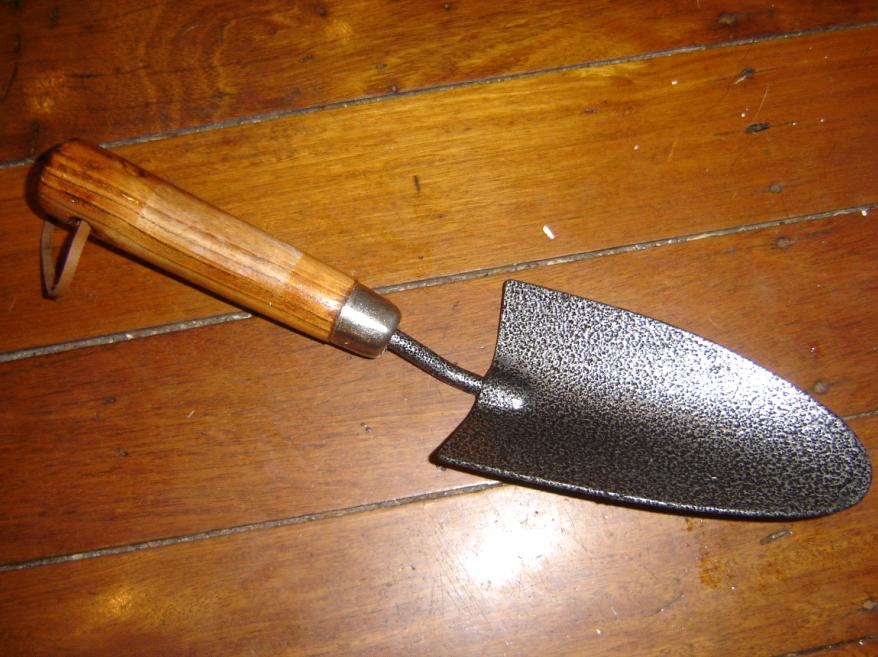
Garden trowel

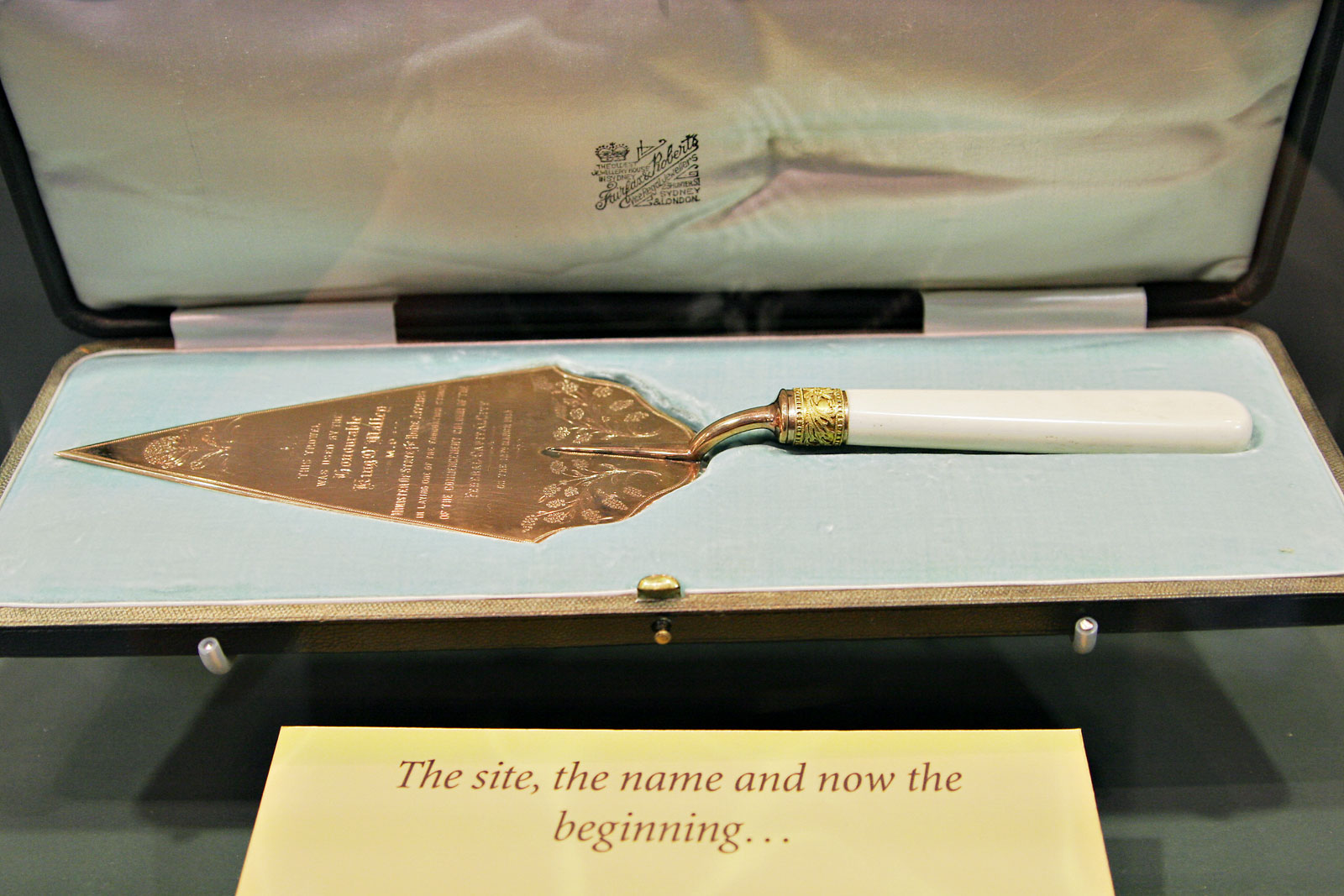
Ceremonial bricklayer's trowel used in laying one of the foundation stones of the commencement column of the Federal Capital city of Canberra in 1913

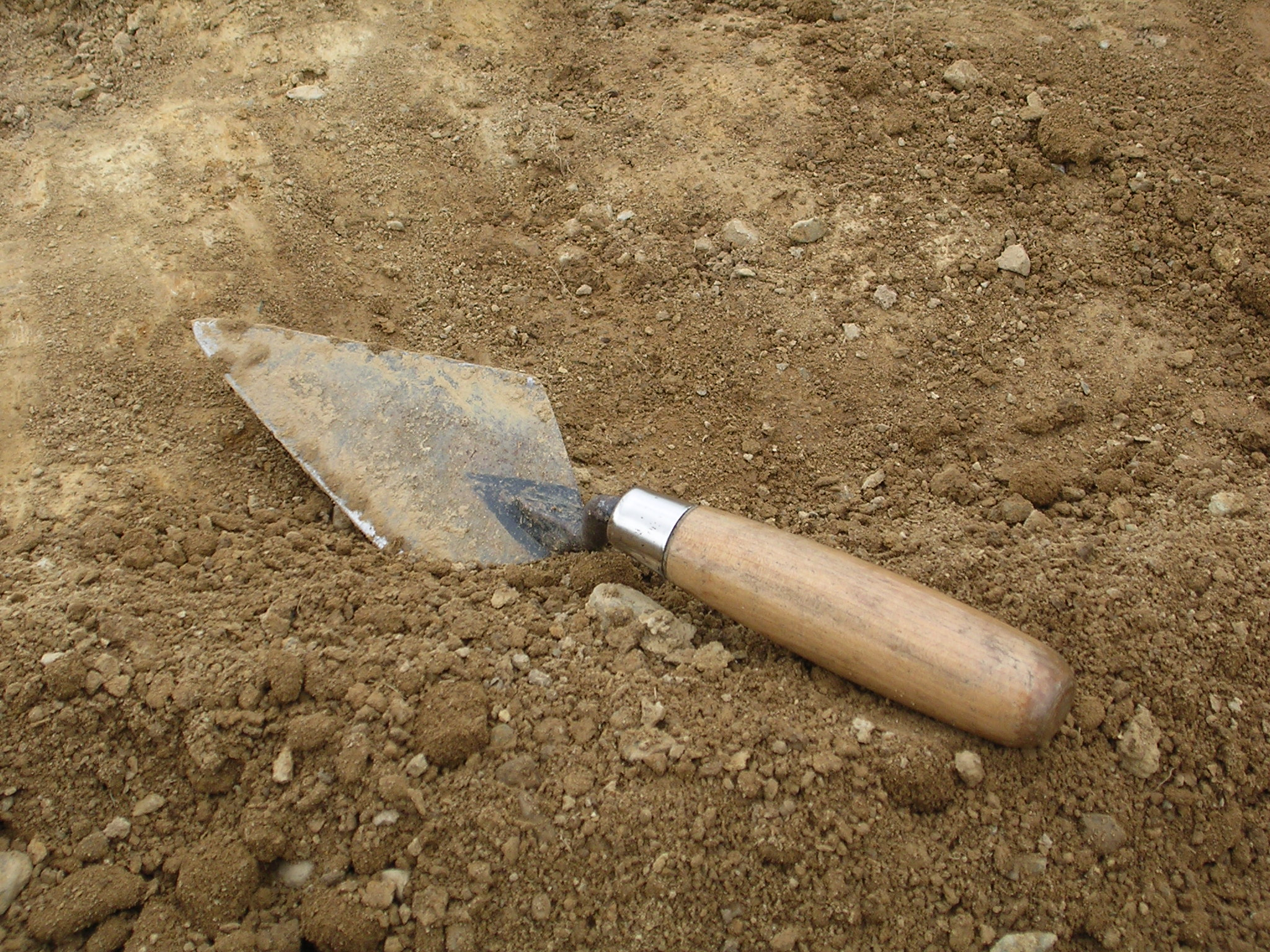
Pointing trowel used in an archaeological excavation

Numerous forms of trowel are used in masonry, concrete, and drywall construction, as well as applying adhesives such as those used in tiling and laying synthetic flooring. Masonry trowels are traditionally made of forged carbon steel, but some newer versions are made of cast stainless steel, which has longer wear and is rust-free. These include:

- Bricklayer's trowel has an elongated triangular-shaped flat metal blade, used by masons for leveling, spreading, and shaping cement, plaster, and mortar.
- Pointing trowel, a scaled-down version of a bricklayer's trowel, for small jobs and repair work.
- Tuck pointing trowel is long and thin, designed for packing mortar between bricks.
- Float trowel or finishing trowel is usually rectangular, used to smooth, level, or texture the top layer of hardening concrete. A flooring trowel has one rectangular end and one pointed end, made to fit corners. A grout float is used for applying and working grout into gaps in floor and wall tile.
- Gauging trowel has a rounded tip, used to mix measured proportions of the different ingredients for quick set plaster.
- Pool trowel is a flat-bladed tool with rounded ends used to apply coatings to concrete, especially on swimming pool decks.
- Margin trowel is a small rectangular bladed tool used to move, apply, and smooth small amounts of masonry or adhesive material.

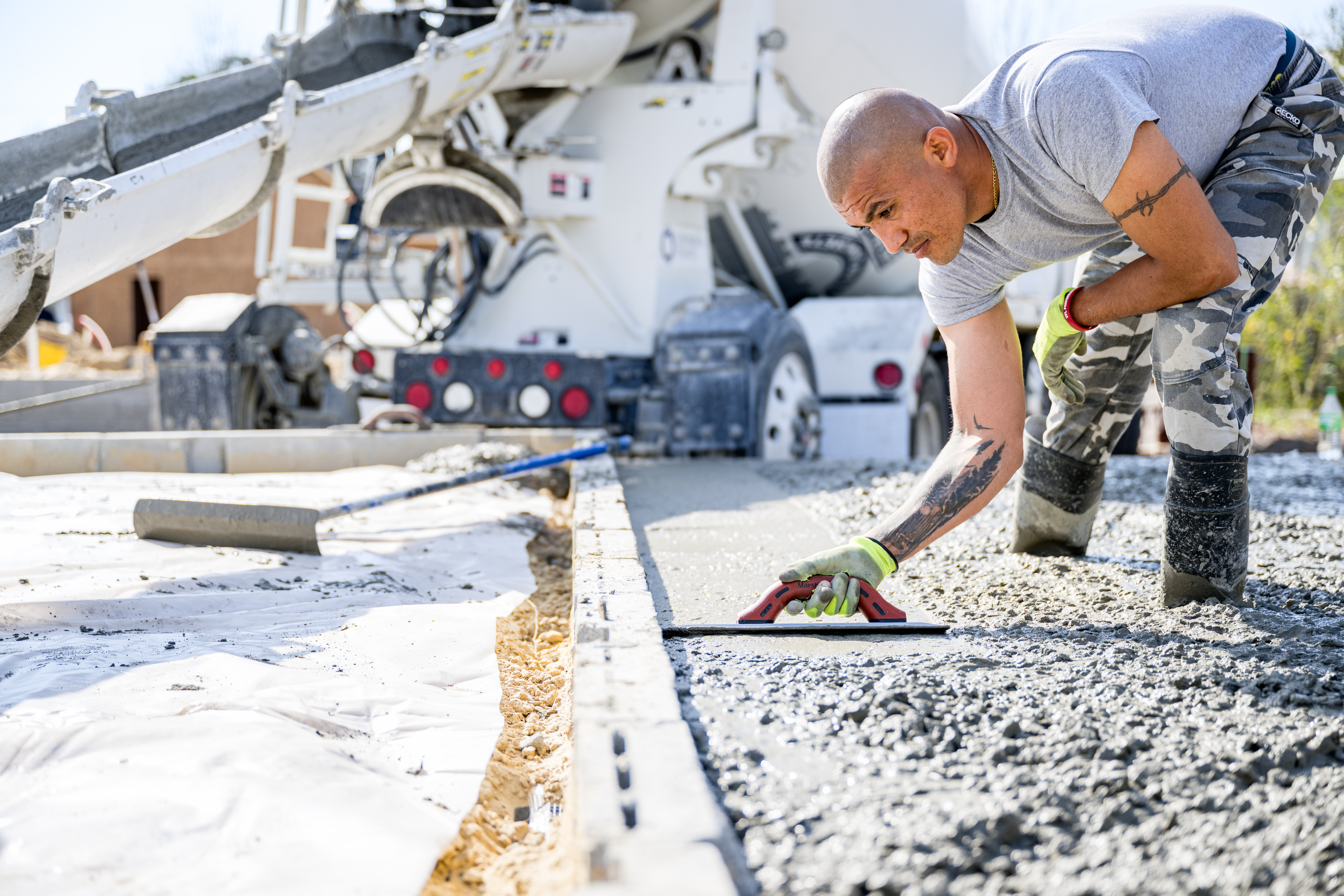
Construction worker using a float trowel to smooth freshly poured concrete

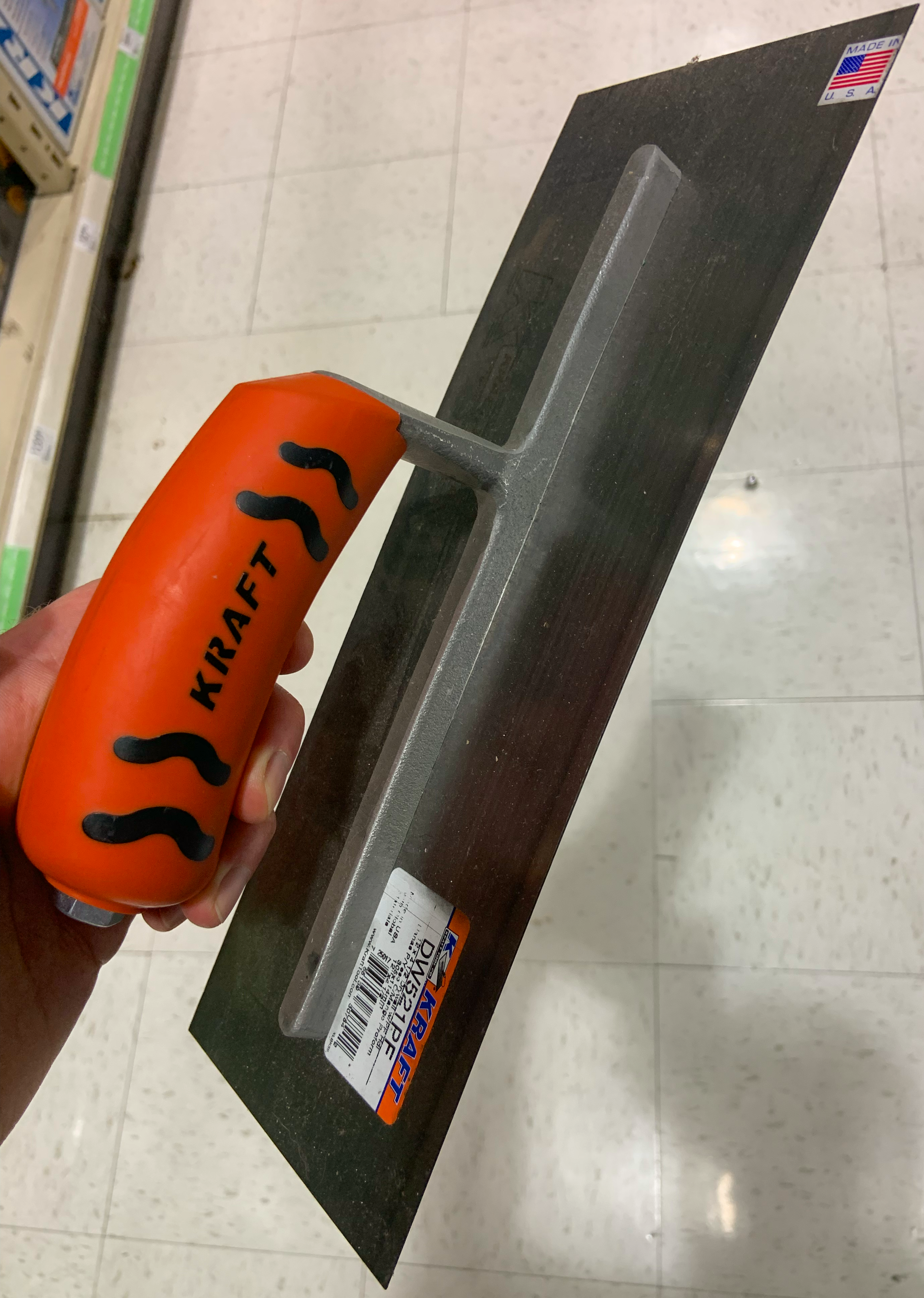
Finishing trowel for drywalling

- Notched trowel is a rectangular shaped tool with regularly spaced notches along one or more sides used to apply adhesive when adhering tile, or laying synthetic floor surfaces.

Other forms of trowel include:

- Garden trowel, a hand tool with a pointed, scoop-shaped metal blade and wooden, metal, or plastic handle. It is comparable to a spade or shovel, but is generally much smaller, being designed for use with one hand. It is used for breaking up earth, digging small holes, especially for planting and weeding, mixing in fertilizer or other additives, and transferring plants to pots.
- Camping trowel, a hand tool used in the outdoors to securely stake and prop up a tent, channel a small stream of water, level a sleeping surface, dig a cathole for no traces of waste and do many more outdoor survival chores. Camping trowels can sometimes be made of lighter weight materials than gardening trowels to make them easier to carry in a backpack or they can be made of heavier materials for chopping kindling or shoveling soil without having to awkwardly reach or bend over. Camping trowels may incorporate a secondary side ruler to measure ground surface depth; however, the ruler might prematurely become defaced from course soil particulates. Camping trowels sometimes have a front tip and side features, such as a pointed tip and a serrated side edge to easily cut through tree roots or frozen soil. These serrated camping trowels may include a cover guard to protect the user from cut wounds as well as save backpacks from puncture holes and tears. They may also fold-up for added protection and easy storage. Few others allow for items such as toilet paper to be stored upon or inside the handle.[2]
- In archaeology, brick or pointing trowels (usually 4" or 5" steel trowels) are used to scratch the strata in an excavation and allow the colors of the soil to be clear, so that the different strata can be identified, processed and excavated. In the United States, there are several preferred brands of pointing trowels, including the Marshalltown trowel; while in the British Isles the WHS 4" pointing trowel is the traditional tool.

== See also ==
- Media related to Trowels at Wikimedia Commons
- The dictionary definition of trowel at Wiktionary
- Taping knife, a drywall tool with a wide blade for spreading joint compound
- Putty knife, a generally smaller and variously shaped tool used in a variety of applications
- Palette knife, a smaller but similarly shaped tool used in oil painting
- Power trowel
- Kunai
- Hori hori
