= Marshalltown trowel =

Implement used for archaeology and bricklaying

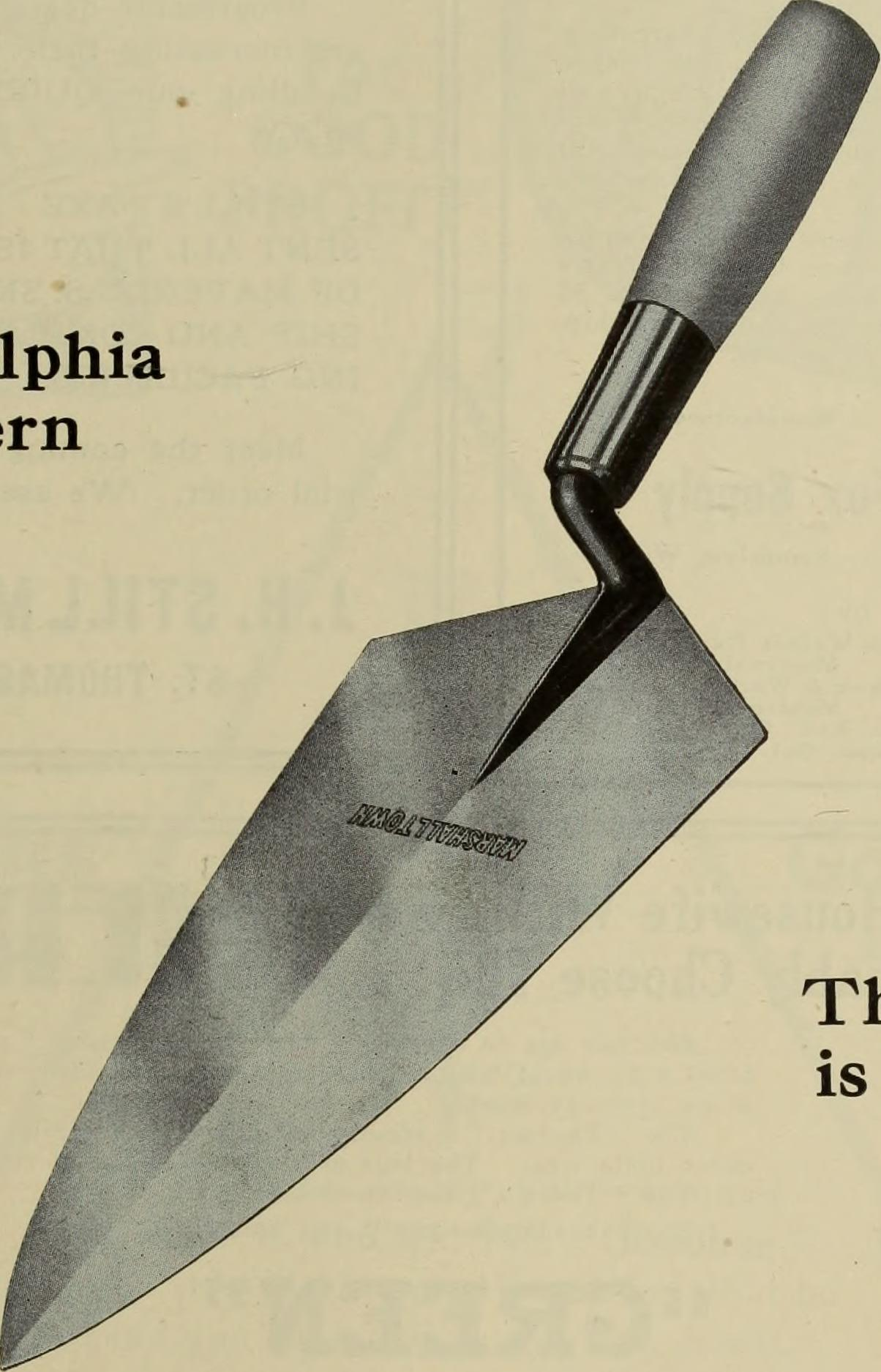
A 1912 advertisement for a Marshalltown Trowel.

The Marshalltown trowel is an excavation implement frequently used by archaeologists and bricklayers.

Manufactured by the Marshalltown Company of Marshalltown, Iowa, the trowel was first introduced in the 1890s. A patent filed for its handle by the company on July 12, 1927 was granted on December 23, 1930. The Marshalltown trowel is made of a single piece of metal. The 5-inch and 6-inch pointing trowels are most often used for archaeology. It is larger and more flexible than the WHS trowel preferred by archaeologists in the United Kingdom, which makes it better for cleaning profiles but less suited to digging heavy clay and gravel deposits. It is also used by bricklayers in the United Kingdom.
