= Five-gallon bucket =

Container

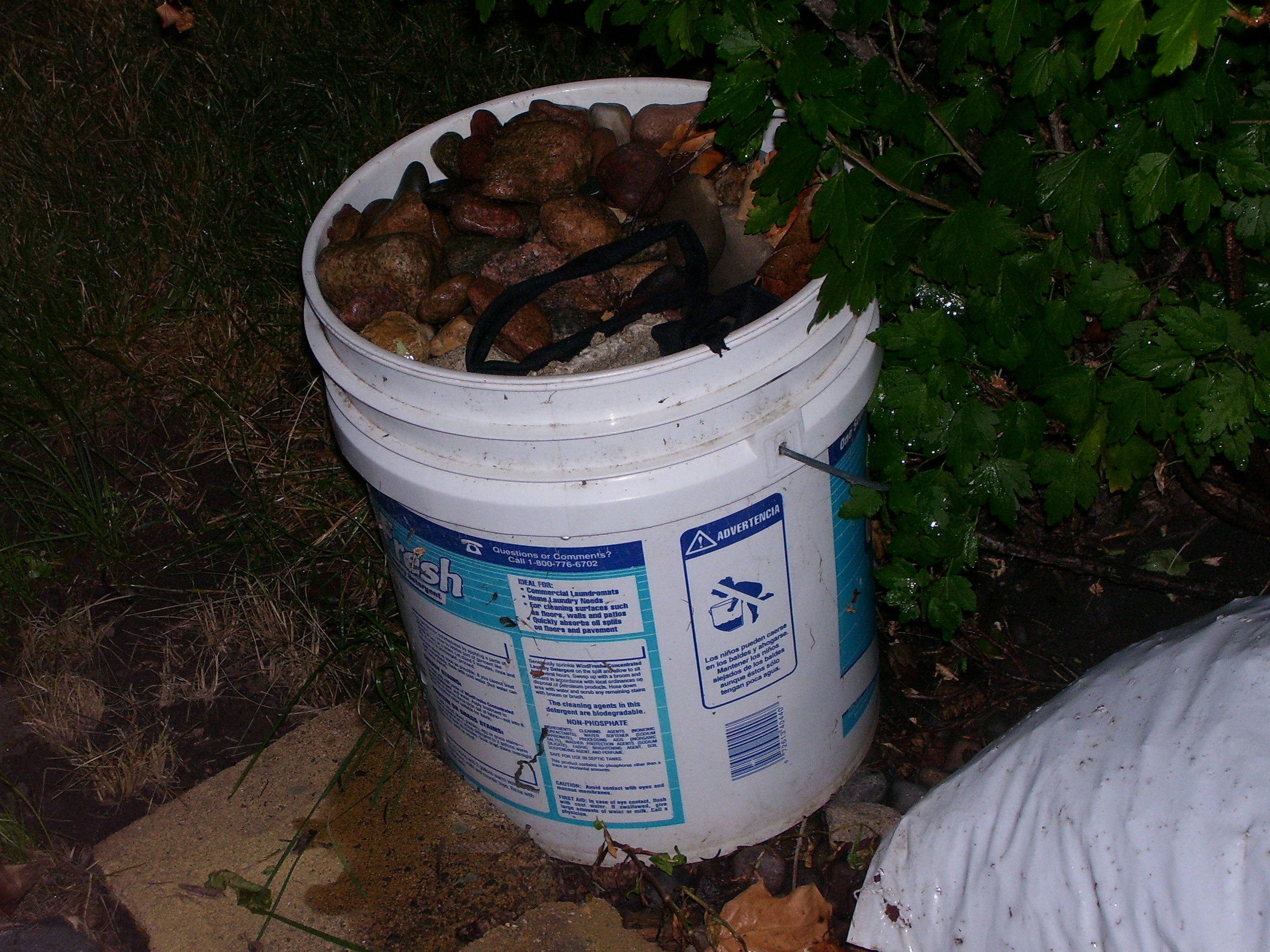
Bucket full of stones.

The five-gallon bucket, also known as an 18-liter bucket or a 20-liter bucket, is a common bucket size in the United States and Canada, with a liquid capacity of 5 gallons (18.93 L).

== History ==
In the 1960s, buckets were generally made out of metal. In 1967, William Roper, an owner of a plastic-molding company based in Los Angeles, introduced a plastic pail with a lid, creating one of the first five-gallon buckets as a result. At the end of the 20th century, around 170 million five-gallon buckets were produced annually in the United States and Canada. The annual revenue generated from the selling of five-gallon buckets was $350 million.

== Design ==
The buckets are typically fourteen inches tall, with a diameter of twelve inches. A wire or plastic handle is usually attached to the top three inches. Five-gallon buckets are usually designed to be nested in each other for storage. Plastic buckets have more uses due to the popularity of plastic for food products and the tendency of metal pails to rust.

== Sustainability ==
Unused buckets from restaurants occasionally end up in landfills. Some five-gallon buckets that are placed in recycling bins might not end up being recycled, as it is usually cheaper to create new plastics than recycle them.

== Safety ==
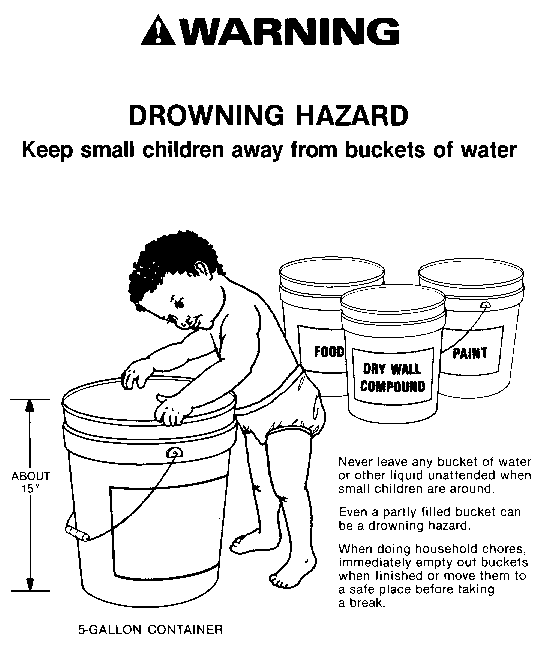
Safety warning label

Small children can fall inside of the bucket and not have the strength or weight to escape, as it was designed to avoid tipping over. At the end of the 20th century, roughly 40 deaths per year were caused by drowning in a 5-gallon bucket across the United States.

=== Warning labels ===
In an effort to reduce the risk of small children falling in and drowning, a visual warning label is often present on the side of five-gallon buckets.

== See also ==
- Bucket
- Duct tape
- Americana (culture)

== Sources ==
- Chicago Tribune (1994-10-16). "Safety panel pours itself into 5-gallon bucket furor". Chicago Tribune.
