= Masonry trowel =

Hand tool for use with mortar or concrete

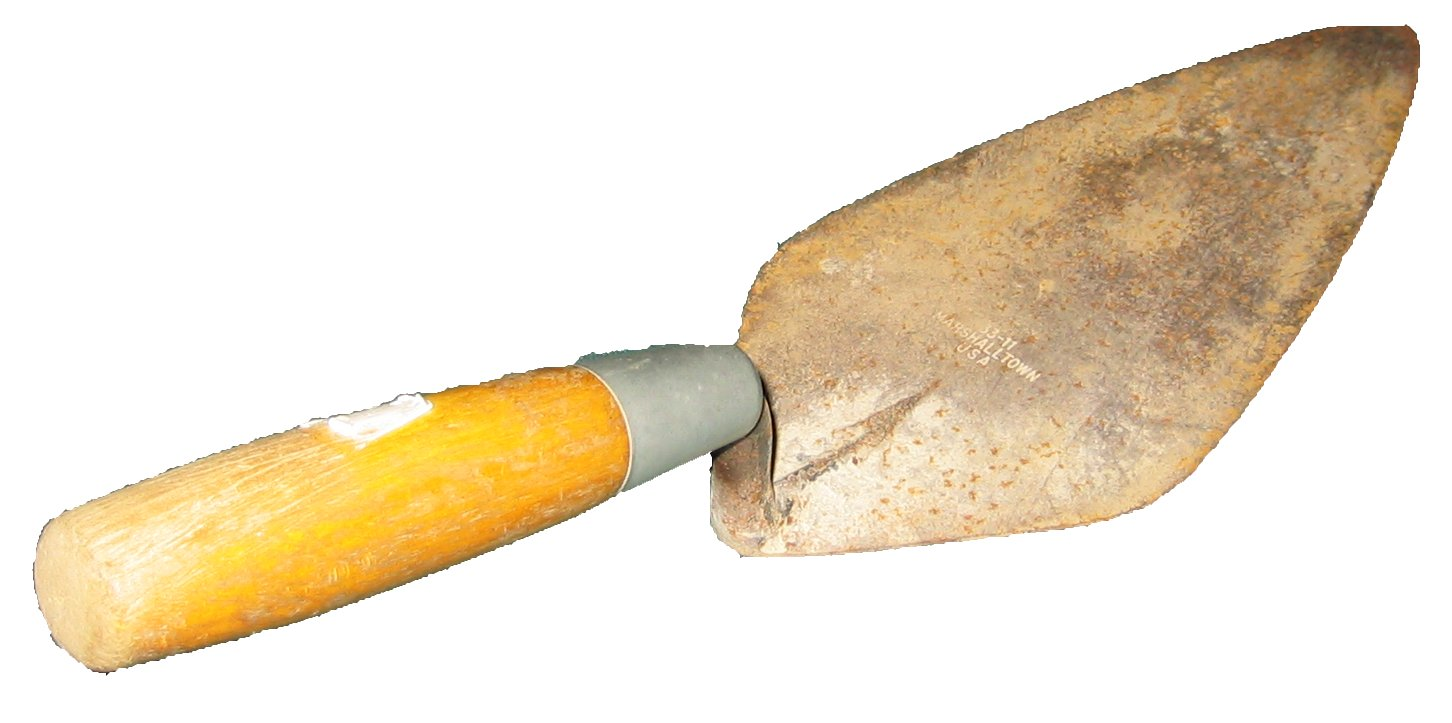
Mason's trowel

The masonry trowel is a hand trowel used in brickwork or stonework for levelling, spreading and shaping mortar or concrete. They come in several shapes and sizes depending on the task. The following is a list of the more common masonry trowels:

- Brick trowel: or mason's trowel is a point-nosed trowel for spreading mortar on bricks or concrete blocks with a technique called "buttering". The shape of the blade allows for very precise control of mortar placement.
- Bucket trowel: a wide-bladed tool for scooping mortar from a bucket; it is also good for buttering bricks and smoothing mortar.
- Concrete finishing trowel: is used to smooth a surface after the concrete has begun to set; it is held nearly level to the surface of the concrete, and moved with a sweeping arc across the surface.
- Corner trowel: used for shaping concrete around internal or external corners; the handle is located at the center of a 90° bend in the blade for balance and the ability to apply even pressure to both sides of a corner.
- Gauging trowel: a round-nosed trowel used for mixing mortar and applying small amounts in confined areas; it is also used to replace crumbled mortar and to patch concrete.
- Margin trowel: a flat-nosed trowel used to work mortar in tight spaces and corners where a larger pointed trowel will not fit.
- Pointing trowel: a smaller version of the brick trowel. Useful for filling in small cavities and repairing crumbling mortar joints.
- Pool trowel or round trowel: a variation of the concrete finishing trowel; rounded blade prevents it from digging into wet concrete.
- Step trowel: similar to the corner trowel, it is used for shaping inside angles on concrete steps; the center of the 90-degree bend in the blade allows for rounded edges.
- Tile setter: a brick trowel with an extra-wide blade to hold more mortar than a standard brick trowel. It is ideal for smoothing mortar on large bricks and blocks.
- Tuck pointer: used for neatly packing mortar between bricks and blocks when repointing and repairing crumbling mortar in masonry walls.
