= Taping knife =

Hand tool with a wide blade

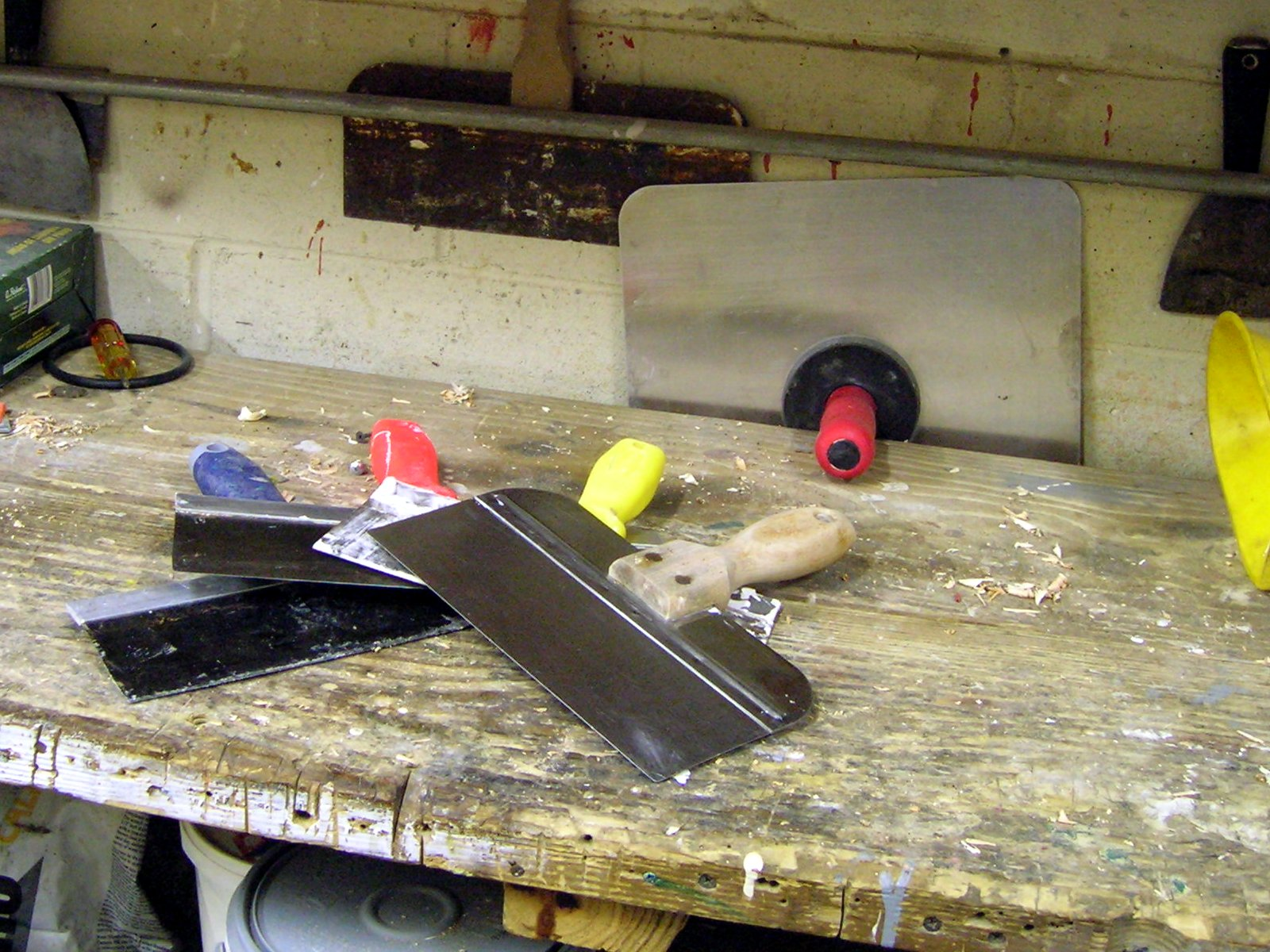
Taping knives and hawk

A taping knife or joint knife is a drywall tool with a wide blade for spreading joint compound, also known as "mud". It can be used to spread mud over nail and screw indents in new drywall applications and is also used when using paper or fiberglass drywall tape to cover seams. Other common uses include patching holes, smoothing wall-coverings and creating specialty artistic wall finishes. Common sizes range from 15cm to 30cm wide (five to 12 inches). Spackle knives are a smaller version, used for patching small holes.

A right-angle joint knife allows one to apply joint compound to inside corners where walls meet. The handle is offset to allow clearance for fingers.
