= Hawk (disambiguation) =

The hawk is a predatory bird.

Hawk or The Hawk may also refer to:

== People ==
- Hawk (nickname), a list of people
- Hawk (surname), a list of people
- Road Warrior Hawk, or Hawk, the ring name of Michael Hegstrand (1957–2003), American professional wrestler
- John Edward Hawkins (1969–2006), American rapper better known as "H.A.W.K." or "Big Hawk"
- Adolfas Ramanauskas (1918–1957), Lithuanian anti-Soviet partisan codenamed Vanagas (Hawk)
- Lee Reherman (1966–2016), "Hawk" on the TV show American Gladiators

== Places ==
- Hawk, Virginia, an unincorporated community
- Hawk Hill, California
- Hawk Mountain, in the Appalachian Mountains in Pennsylvania
- Hawk Woods, outside the city of Athens, Ohio
- The Hawk, Nova Scotia, Canada, a community

== Arts, entertainment, and media ==
=== Fictional characters ===
- Hawk (birdman), a character from the second season of the series Buck Rogers in the 25th Century
- Hawk (G.I. Joe), a character in the G.I. Joe universe
- Hawk (The Seven Deadly Sins), a character in the manga series The Seven Deadly Sins
- Hawk, the titular character in Robert B. Parker's Spenser novels and the TV series A Man Called Hawk
- Hawk, half of the DC comic book superhero team of Hawk and Dove
- Hawk, the title character of the film Hudson Hawk, played by Bruce Willis
- Alonzo Hawk, a recurring villain in three Walt Disney movies
- Henery Hawk, a cartoon character
- Lieutenant Hawk, a character from the film Star Trek: First Contact
- T. Hawk, a character from Street Fighter
- Hawks (My Hero Academia), a character in the manga series My Hero Academia
- Deputy Tommy "Hawk" Hill, a character from the TV series Twin Peaks
- Eli "Hawk" Moskowitz, a character from the TV series Cobra Kai

=== Films ===
- The Hawk, a 1932 film starring John Wayne (US title Ride Him, Cowboy)
- The Hawk (1935 film), a 1935 American Western film
- The Hawk (1982 film), a Canadian documentary film about musician Ronnie "the Hawk" Hawkins
- The Hawk (1993 film), starring Helen Mirren

=== Music ===
- Hawk (Isobel Campbell and Mark Lanegan album), 2010, or the title track
- Hawk (Big Hawk album), 2001
- "Hawk", a song by Bicep from their 2021 album Isles
- The Hawk (Ronnie Hawkins album), 1971

=== Periodicals ===
- The Hawk (newspaper), the weekly student newspaper of Saint Joseph's University
- The Hawk, a journal of the Royal Air Force

=== Radio station brand names ===
- CIGO-FM, in Port Hawkesbury, Nova Scotia, Canada
- CKDK-FM, in Woodstock, Ontario, Canada
- KHKK-FM, in Modesto, California
- WCHR-FM, in Manahawkin, New Jersey
- WHWK, in Binghamton, New York
- WODE-FM, in Easton, Pennsylvania

=== Other uses in arts, entertainment, and media ===
- Hawk (novel), a novel by Steven Brust
- Hawk (TV series), a 1966 American TV series starring Burt Reynolds
- The Hawk (TV series), a 2026 American TV series starring Will Ferrell
- Hawk Films, a British production company formed by Stanley Kubrick

== Military ==
- Curtiss Hawk (disambiguation), a series of aircraft
- BAE Systems Hawk, British advanced jet trainer
- Hawk MM-1, a model of grenade launcher
- HMAS Hawk, two ships of the Royal Australian Navy
- HMS Hawk, several ships of the Royal Navy
- MIM-23 Hawk, an American surface-to-air missile
- Task Force Hawk, an ad hoc US Army unit formed during the 1999 unrest in Kosovo
- USS Hawk, several ships of the U.S. Navy
- UH-60 Black Hawk, an American military helicopter
  - Sikorsky HH-60 Pave Hawk

== Racehorses ==
- The Hawk (horse), a New Zealand Thoroughbred racehorse
- The Hawk, a racehorse that finished ninth in the 1841 Grand National

== Transport ==
- Hawk (cyclecar), built by the Hawk Cyclecar Company in 1914 in Detroit, Michigan
- CGS Hawk, ultralight aircraft designed in 1982
- Humber Hawk, a British car model
- Miles Hawk, monoplane designed in 1933
- Packard Hawk, an American car model
- Rolls-Royce Hawk, a British aero engine designed in 1915
- South Devon Railway Eagle class, also called Hawk, a 4-4-0ST steam locomotive
- Studebaker Golden Hawk, an American car model (1956–1958)
- Studebaker Gran Turismo Hawk, an American model of car (1962–1964)
- Studebaker Silver Hawk, an American car model (1957–1961)

== Political ideology ==
- War hawk, a term used in politics for someone favoring war
- Chickenhawk (politics), a term used in politics for a war hawk who avoids military service
- Liberal hawk, a political liberal and war hawk
- Deficit hawk, someone who favours reduction of government budget deficits

== Other uses ==
- Hawk (brand), a Filipino bag manufacturer based in Quezon City, Metro Manila
- Hawk (plasterer's tool), a tool used to hold a plaster, mortar, or a similar material
- HAWK beacon, or High-Intensity Activated crossWalK beacon, a traffic signal
- Hawk Model Company, a defunct US model kit manufacturer
- Hawk Stadium, baseball venue of the University of Maryland Eastern Shore
- Monetary hawk and dove, a monetary hawk favors low inflation in monetary policy
- The Hawk (Saint Joseph's University mascot), Pennsylvania, United States
- The Hawk wind, or Hawkins, a slang term for the wind in Chicago
- Tomahawk (axe), also referred to as a hawk, a type of Northern American single-handed axe

== See also ==
- Black Hawk (disambiguation)
- Hawke (disambiguation)
- Hawkes
- Hawkins (disambiguation)
- Hawks (disambiguation)
- Sea Hawk (disambiguation)
- Starhawk (disambiguation)
