= Habig =

Habig is a surname. Notable people with the surname include:

- Bettina Habig, real name of Texas Patti (born 1982, Münster), a German pornographic actress
- Ernst-Günter Habig (1935, Cologne – 2012, Cologne), a German football player and coach; The father of Günter
- Günter Habig (born 1964), a German football player
- Inge Elisabeth Habig (1923, Freiburg im Breisgau – 2022), a German art historian; The daughter of Walter Bappert
- Jannie Habig, a South African rally driver
- Neil Habig (born 1936, West Lafayette), a Canadian football player
- Stephan Habig (Habicht, Hawich, Havig; 1753, Koblenz – 1827), a German painter, see Stephan Hawich; The father of Christoph Hawich

== See also ==
- the P. & C. Habig, the hat manufacturer and Purveyor to the Imperial & Royal Court in Wieden, Vienna; Named for Peter Habig (1839, Salmünster, Bad Soden-Salmünster – 1916, Vienna)

- der Habig-Hof, a historical and listed building on the Wiedner Hauptstraße, Wieden, Vienna

- Habich
- Hawich
- Habicht
- Hawig
- Häbich
- Hauk
- Hawk, Hawks
