= Hawks (disambiguation) =

Hawks are medium-large sized predatory birds.

Hawks may also refer to:

- Hawks (surname)
- Hawks (film), a film starring Timothy Dalton
- Hawks (South Africa), an anti-corruption unit of the South African Police Service
- Hawks, Ohio, a community in the United States
- The Hawks, a band that became The Band
- Bill Hawks, a character on Wagon Train, played by Terry Wilson
- Hawks (band) a band from the Otho/Fort Dodge Iowa area
- Hawks, the hero name for the character Keigo Takami from the anime series My Hero Academia

Sport

- Atlanta Hawks, an NBA basketball team from Atlanta, Georgia, U.S.
- Fukuoka SoftBank Hawks, a Japanese baseball team
- Hanau Hawks, a defunct American football club from Hanau, Germany
- Hawke's Bay Hawks, a New Zealand basketball team
- Hawks' Club, a social club for sportsmen of the University of Cambridge
- Hawks F.C., a 19th-century amateur football club in England
- Hawks FC, a football club in Gambia
- Hawthorn Hawks, an Australian Football League team
- Hunslet Hawks, the former name of an English rugby league team
- Illawarra Hawks, an Australian basketball team competing in the National Basketball League
- Järvenpää Hawks, a Finnish ice hockey team
- Maryland Eastern Shore Hawks, the collegiate athletic program of the University of Maryland Eastern Shore
- Saint Joseph's Hawks, the collegiate athletic program of Saint Joseph's University in Philadelphia
- Seattle Seahawks, a National Football League team
- University of Iowa Hawkeyes, an American collegiate athletics team that participates in multiple sporting events
- A nickname for the Chicago Blackhawks of the NHL
- A nickname for the United States national rugby league team
- A nickname for Whitehawk F.C., a football club in Brighton, England

== See also ==
- Hawk (disambiguation)
- Hawkes
