= Hawk (nickname) =

As a nickname, Hawk or The Hawk may refer to:

== In arts and entertainment ==
- Coleman Hawkins (1904–1969), American jazz saxophonist
- Ronnie Hawkins (1935–2022), American rockabilly musician also known as "The Hawk"
- Hawk Koch (born 1945), American film producer and former road manager for The Supremes and The Dave Clark Five
- Hawk Wolinski (born 1948), American keyboardist, songwriter and record producer

== In sports ==
- Ralph "Hawk" Branca (1926–2016), American All Star baseball player
- Andre Dawson (born 1954), American Hall of Fame baseball player nicknamed "The Hawk"
- Barry Hawkins (born 1979), English professional snooker player nicknamed "The Hawk"
- Connie Hawkins (1942–2017), former National Basketball Association player and Harlem Globetrotter known as "The Hawk"
- Julian Jackson (born 1960), Former professional boxer nicknamed "The Hawk"
- Ben Hogan (1912–1997), American golfer nicknamed "The Hawk"
- Harry "Hawk" McGinnis (born 1926), American making an around-the-world walking tour
- Ken Harrelson (born 1941), American All Star baseball player and sportscaster nicknamed "The Hawk"
- Hawk Taylor (1939–2012), American Major League Baseball catcher nicknamed "The Hawk"

== See also ==
- Hawk (disambiguation)
- Hawk (surname)
