= Hawkes =

Hawkes is a surname. Notable people with the surname include:

- Albert W. Hawkes (1878–1971), Senator from New Jersey
- Aristazabal Hawkes, member of the band, Guillemots
- Brent Hawkes (1950), Canadian clergyman and gay rights activist
- Christopher Hawkes (1905–1992), English archaeologist
- Chesney Hawkes (1971), English musician and actor
- David Hawkes (disambiguation), multiple people including:
  - David Hawkes (scholar) (1923–2009), British sinologist
- Dean Hawkes (1938), British architect
- George Wright Hawkes (1821–1908), lay Anglican churchman in Adelaide, South Australia
- Graham Hawkes (1947), submarine engineer and entrepreneur
- Greg Hawkes (1952), keyboardist for The Cars
- Howard Hawkes (1894–1970), American football coach
- J. H. M. Hawkes (1851–1944), businessman of Adelaide, South Australia
- Jacquetta Hawkes (1910–1996), British archaeologist
- James S. Hawkes (1856–1919), Australian accountant and civil engineer
- Jane Hawkes, Art historian
- Jeff Hawkes (1953), South African professional golfer
- Jim Hawkes (1934–2019), Canadian MP
- John Hawkes (disambiguation), several names including

- John Hawkes (actor), born John Marvin Perkins in 1959, US actor

- Kristen Hawkes, American anthropologist
- Leonard Hawkes (1891–1981), British geologist
- Michael Hawkes (1977), American football player
- Onéra Amelia Merritt-Hawkes (1877–1951), zoologist, travel writer
- Rechelle Hawkes (1967), Australian hockey player
- Robert Hawkes (1880–1945), English footballer
- Sonia Chadwick Hawkes (1933–1999), British archaeologist
- Terri Hawkes (1958), Canadian actor

== See also ==
- Hawke's Bay, New Zealand
- Hawkes Harbor, novel
- Hawks
- Hawke (disambiguation)
