= Plasterwork =

Construction or ornamentation done in plaster or a similar material

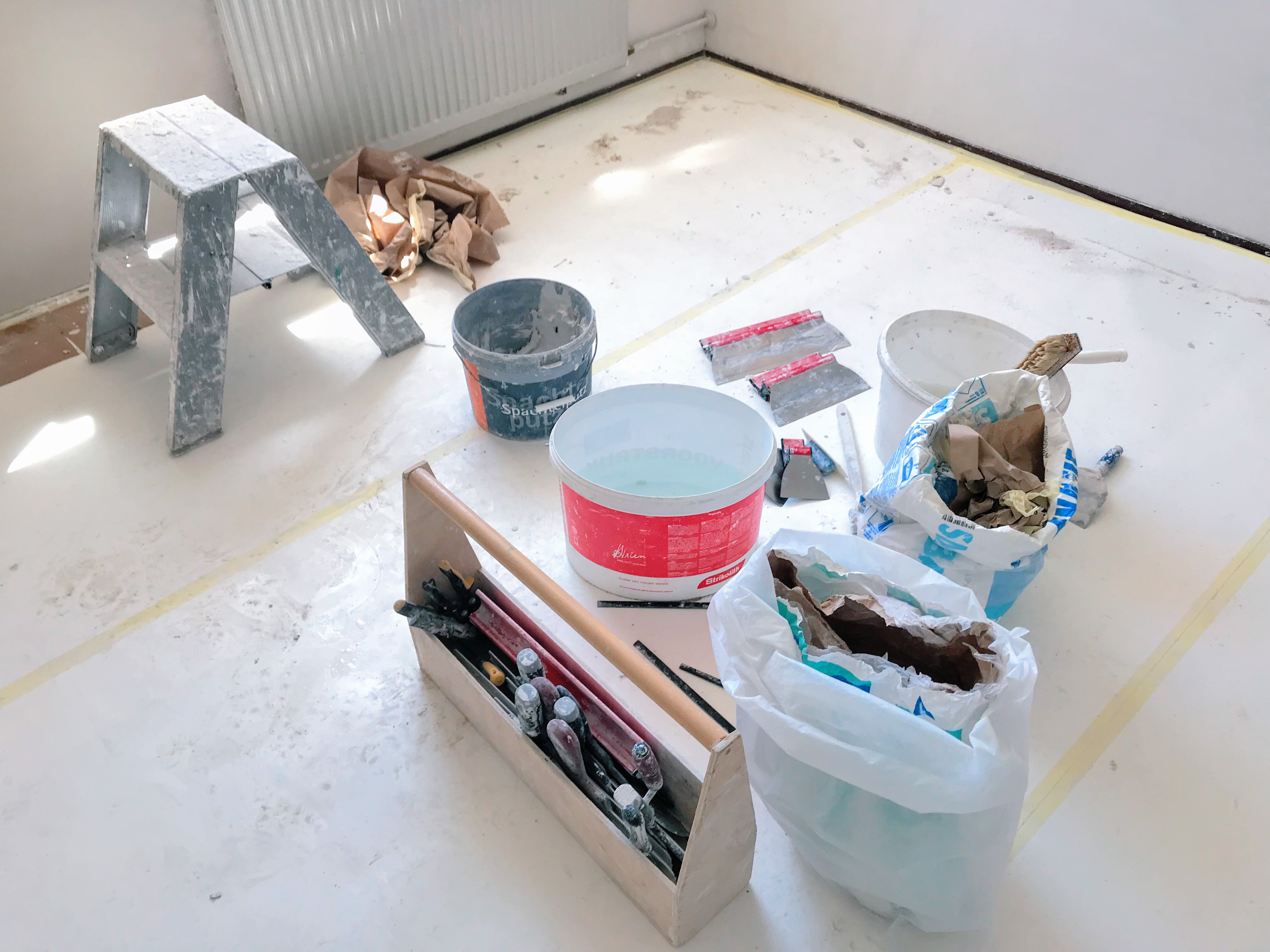
The tools used to plaster walls

Plasterwork is construction or ornamentation done with plaster, such as a layer of plaster on an interior or exterior wall structure, or plaster decorative moldings on ceilings or walls. This is also sometimes called pargeting. The process of creating plasterwork, called plastering or rendering, has been used in building construction for centuries. For the art history of three-dimensional plaster, see stucco.

== History ==
The earliest plasters known to us were lime-based. Around 7500 BC, the people of 'Ain Ghazal in Jordan used lime mixed with unheated crushed limestone to make plaster which was used on a large scale for covering walls, floors, and hearths in their houses. Often, walls and floors were decorated with red, finger-painted patterns and designs. In ancient India and China, renders in clay and gypsum plasters were used to produce a smooth surface over rough stone or mud brick walls, while in early Egyptian tombs, walls were coated with lime and gypsum plaster and the finished surface was often painted or decorated.

Modelled stucco was employed throughout the Roman Empire. The Romans used mixtures of lime and sand to build up preparatory layers over which finer applications of gypsum, lime, sand and marble dust were made; pozzolanic materials were sometimes added to produce a more rapid set. Following the fall of the Roman Empire, the addition of marble dust to plaster to allow the production of fine detail and a hard, smooth finish in hand-modelled and moulded decoration was not used until the Renaissance. Around the 4th century BC, the Romans discovered the principles of the hydraulic set of lime, which by the addition of highly reactive forms of silica and alumina, such as volcanic earths, could solidify rapidly even under water. There was little use of hydraulic mortar after the Roman period until the 18th century.

Plaster decoration was widely used in Europe in the Middle Ages where, from the mid-13th century, gypsum plaster was used for internal and external plaster. Hair was employed as reinforcement, with additives to assist set or plasticity including malt, urine, beer, milk and eggs.

=== 14th century ===
In the 14th century, decorative plasterwork called pargeting was being used in South-East England to decorate the exterior of timber-framed buildings. This is a form of incised, moulded or modelled ornament, executed in lime putty or mixtures of lime and gypsum plaster. During this same period, terracotta was reintroduced into Europe and was widely used for the production of ornament.

=== 15th century ===
In the mid-15th century, Venetian skilled workers developed a new type of external facing, called marmorino made by applying lime directly onto masonry.

=== 16th century ===
In the 16th century, a new highly decorative type of decorative internal plasterwork, called scagliola, was invented by stuccoists working in Bavaria. This was composed of gypsum plaster, animal glue and pigments, used to imitate coloured marbles and pietre dure ornament. Sand or marble dust, and lime, were sometimes added. In this same century, the sgraffito technique, also known as graffito or scratchwork, was introduced into Germany by Italian artists, combining it with modelled stucco decoration. This technique was practised in antiquity and was described by Vasari as being a quick and durable method for decorating building facades. Here, layers of contrasting lime plaster were applied and a design scratched through the upper layer to reveal the colour beneath.

=== 17th century ===
The 17th century saw the introduction of different types of internal plasterwork. Stucco marble was an artificial marble made using gypsum (sometimes with lime), pigments, water and glue. Stucco lustro was another a form of imitation marble (sometimes called stucco lucido) where a thin layer of lime or gypsum plaster was applied over a scored support of lime, with pigments scattered on surface of the wet plaster.

=== 18th century ===
The 18th century gave rise to renewed interest in innovative external plasters. Oil mastics introduced in the UK in this period included a "Composition or stone paste" patented in 1765 by David Wark. This was a lime-based mix and included "oyls of tar, turpentine and linseed" besides many other ingredients. Another "Composition or cement", including drying oil, was patented in 1773 by Rev. John Liardet. A similar product was patented in 1777 by John Johnson. Widely used by the architect Robert Adam who in turn commissioned George Jackson to produce reverse-cut boxwood moulds (many of which to Adam designs). Jackson formed an independent company which still today produces composition pressings and retains a very large boxwood mould collection.

In 1774, in France, a mémoire was published on the composition of ancient mortars. This was translated into English as "A Practical Essay on a Cement, and Artificial Stone, justly supposed to be that of the Greeks and Romans" and was published in the same year. Following this, and as a backlash to the disappointment felt due to the repeated failure of oil mastics, in the second half of the 18th century water-based renders gained popularity once more. Mixes for renders were patented, including a "Water Cement, or Stucco" consisting of lime, sand, bone ash and lime-water (Dr Bryan Higgins, 1779). Various experiments mixing different limes with volcanic earths took place in the 18th century. John Smeaton (from 1756) experimented with hydraulic limes and concluded that the best limes were those fired from limestones containing a considerable quantity of clay]ey material. In 1796, Revd James Parker patented Parker's "Roman Cement". This was a hydraulic cement which, when mixed with sand, could be used for stucco. It could also be cast to form mouldings and other ornaments. It was however of an unattractive brown colour, which needed to be disguised by surface finishes.

=== 19th century ===
Natural cements were frequently used in stucco mixes during the 1820s. The popularisation of Portland cement changed the composition of stucco, as well as mortar, to a harder material. The development of artificial cements had started early in the 19th century. In 1811, James Frost took out a patent for an artificial cement obtained by lightly calcining ground chalk and clay together. The French Engineer Louis Vicat in 1812–1813 experimented with calcining synthetic mixtures of limestone and clay, a product he introduced in 1818. In 1822, in the UK, James Frost patented (another?) process, similar to Vicat's, producing what he called "British cement". Portland cement, patented in 1824 by Joseph Aspdin, was called so because it was supposed to resemble Portland stone. Aspdinís son William, and later Isaac Johnson, improved the production process. A product, very similar to modern Portland cement, was available from about 1845, with other improvements taking place in the following years.

Thus, after about 1860, most stucco was composed primarily of Portland cement, mixed with some lime. This made it even more versatile and durable. No longer used just as a coating for a substantial material like masonry or log, stucco could now be applied over wood or metal lath attached to a light wood frame. With this increased strength, it ceased to be just a veneer and became a more integral part of the building structure. Early 19th century rendered façades were colour-washed with distemper; oil paint for external walls was introduced around 1840.

The 19th century also saw the revival of the use of oil mastics. In the UK, patents were obtained for "compositions" in 1803 (Thomas Fulchner), 1815 (Christopher Dihl) and 1817 (Peter Hamelin). These oil mastics, as the ones before them, also proved to be short-lived.

Moulded or cast masonry substitutes, such as cast stone and poured concrete, became popular in place of quarried stone during the 19th century. However, this was not the first time "artificial stone" had been widely used. Coade Stone, a brand name for a cast stone made from fired clay, had been developed and manufactured in England from 1769 to 1843 and was used for decorative architectural elements. Following the closure of the factory in South London, Coade stone stopped being produced, and the formula was lost. By the mid 19th century manufacturing centres were preparing cast stones based on cement for use in buildings. These were made primarily with a cement mix often incorporating fine and coarse aggregates for texture, pigments or dyes to imitate colouring and veining of natural stones, as well as other additives.

Also in the 19th century, various mixtures of modified gypsum plasters, such as Keene's cement, appeared. These materials were developed for use as internal wall plasters, increasing the usefulness of simple plaster of Paris as they set more slowly and were thus easier to use.

== Tools and materials ==
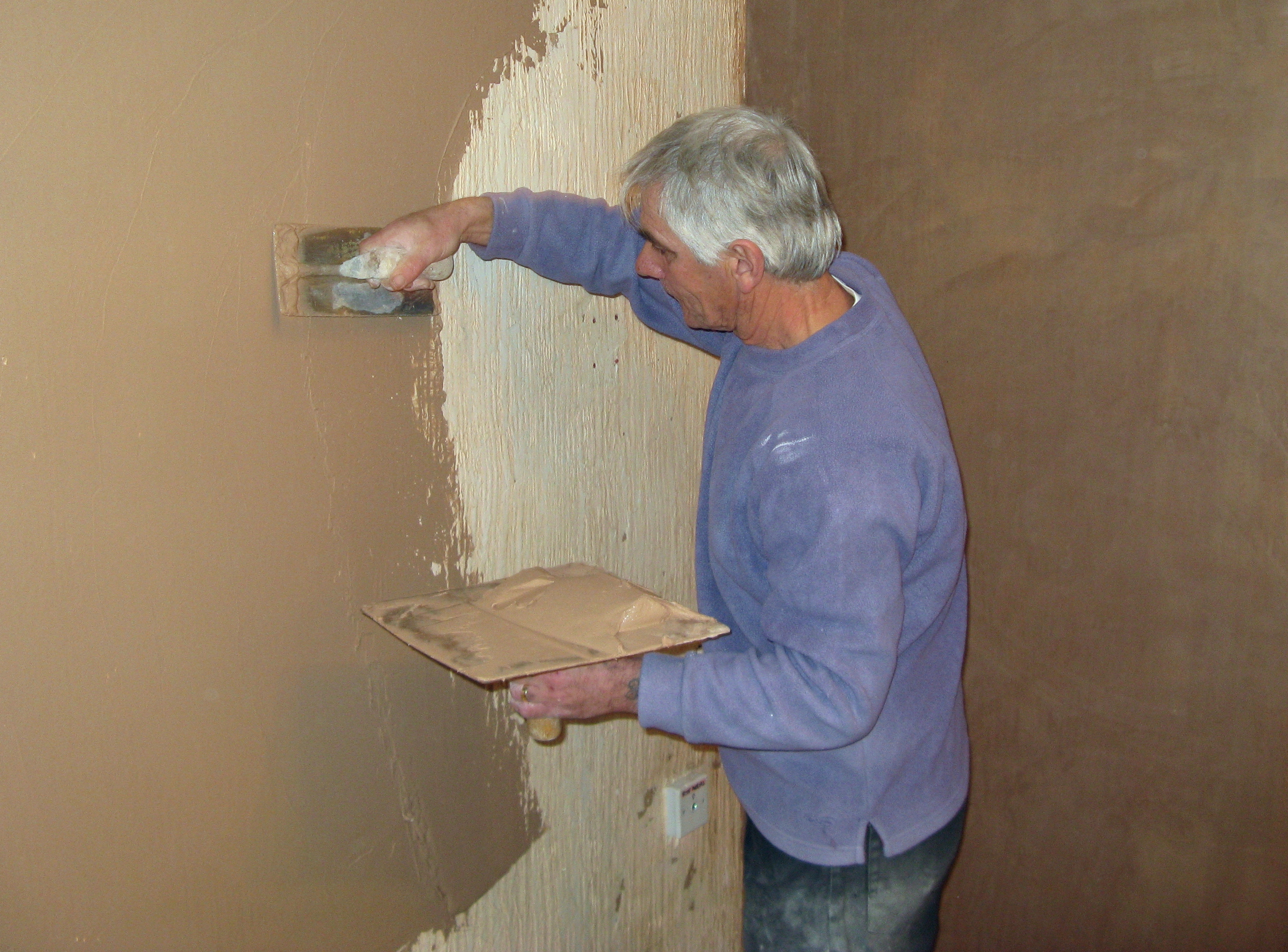
A plasterer covering a wall, using a hawk (in his left hand) and trowel (in his right hand)

Tools and materials include trowels, floats, hammers, screeds, hawk, scratching tools, utility knives, laths, lath nails, lime, sand, hair, plaster of Paris, a variety of cements, and various ingredients to form color washes.

While most tools have remained unchanged over the centuries, developments in modern materials have led to some changes. Trowels, originally constructed from steel, are now available in a polycarbonate material that allows the application of certain new, acrylic-based materials without staining the finish. Floats, traditionally made of timber (ideally straight-grained, knot-free, yellow pine), are often finished with a layer of sponge or expanded polystyrene.

=== Laths ===
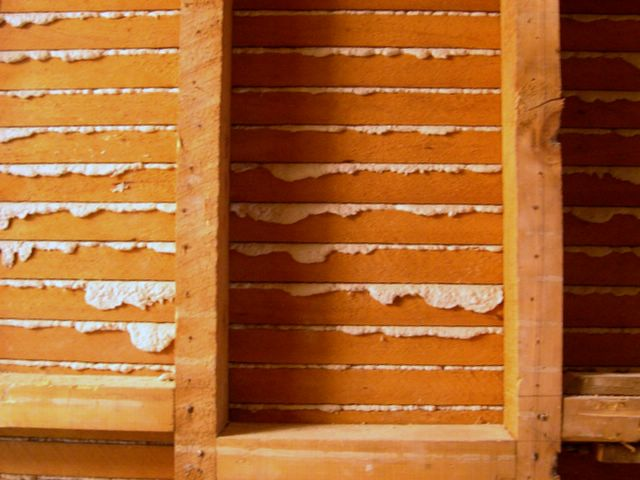
Lath seen from the back with brown coat oozing through

Traditionally, plaster was laid onto laths, rather than plasterboard as is more commonplace nowadays.

Wooden laths are narrow strips of straight-grained wood depending on availability of species in lengths of from two to four or five feet to suit the distances at which the timbers of a floor or partition are set. Laths are about an inch wide, and are made in three thicknesses; single (1/8 to 3/16 in or 3.2 to 4.8 mm thick), lath and a half (1/4 in or 6.4 mm thick), and double (3/8–1/2 in or 9.5–12.7 mm thick).

The thicker laths should be used in ceilings, to stand the extra strain (sometimes they were doubled for extra strength), and the thinner variety in vertical work such as partitions, except where the latter will be subjected to rough usage, in which case thicker laths become necessary. Laths are usually nailed with a space of about 3/8 inch (9.5 mm) between them to form a key for the plaster.

Laths were formerly all made by hand. Most are now made by machinery and are known as sawn laths, those made by hand being called rent or riven laths. Rent laths give the best results, as they split in a line with the grain of the wood, and are stronger and not so liable to twist as machine-made laths, some of the fibers of which are usually cut in the process of sawing.

Laths must be nailed so as to break joint in bays three or four feet wide with ends butted one against the other. By breaking the joints of the lathing in this way, the tendency for the plaster to crack along the line of joints is diminished and a better key is obtained. Every lath should be nailed at each end and wherever it crosses a joist or stud. All timbers over 3 inches (76 mm) wide should be counter-lathed, that is, have a fillet or double lath nailed along the centre upon which the laths are then nailed. This is done to preserve a good key for the plaster.

Walls liable to damp are sometimes battened and lathed to form an air cavity between the damp wall and the plastering.

Lathing in metal, either in wire or in the form of perforated galvanised sheets, is now extensively used on account of its fireproof and lasting quality. There are many kinds of this material in different designs, the best known in England being the Jhilmil, the Bostwick, Lathing, and Expanded Metal lathing. The two last-named are also widely used in the United States.

Lathing nails are usually of iron, cut, wrought or cast, and in the better class of work they are galvanized to prevent rusting. Zinc nails are sometimes used, but are costly.

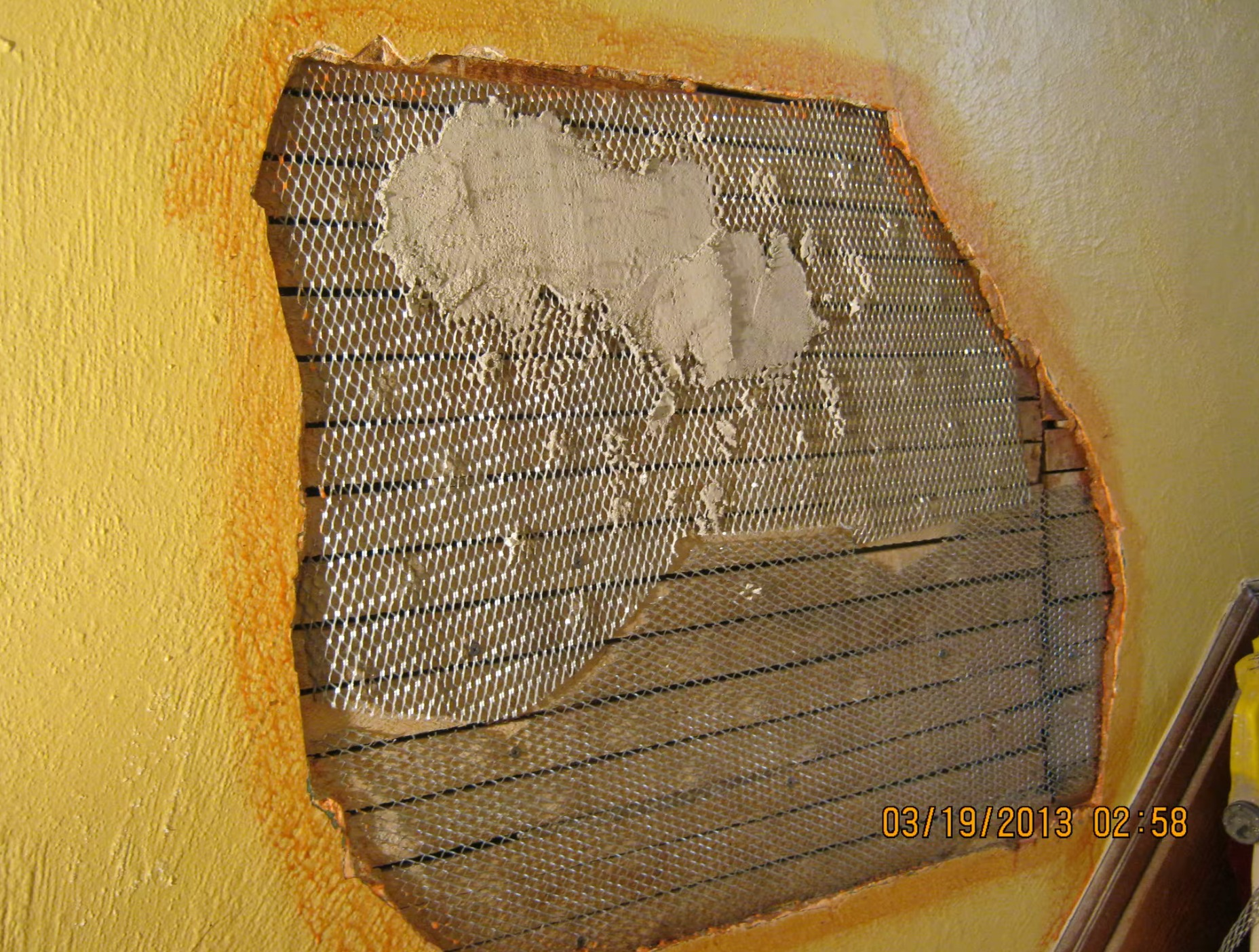
metal lath over wood lath

=== Lime plastering ===
Lime plastering is composed of lime, sand, hair and water in proportions varying according to the nature of the work to be done.

The lime mortar principally used for internal plastering is that calcined from chalk, oyster shells or other nearly pure limestone, and is known as fat, pure, chalk or rich lime. Hydraulic limes are also used by the plasterer, but chiefly for external work.

Perfect slaking of the calcined lime before being used is very important as, if used in a partially slaked condition, it will "blow" when in position and blister the work. Lime should therefore be run as soon as the building is begun, and at least three weeks should elapse between the operation of running the lime and its use.

==== Hair ====
Hair is used in plaster as a binding medium, and gives tenacity to the material. Traditionally horsehair was the most commonly used binder, as it was easily available before the development of the motor-car. Hair functions in much the same way as the strands in fiberglass resin, by controlling and containing any small cracks within the mortar while it dries or when it is subject to flexing.

Ox-hair, which is sold in three qualities, is now the kind usually specified; but horsehair, which is shorter, is sometimes substituted or mixed with the ox-hair in the lower qualities. Good hair should be long (In the UK cow and horse hair of short and long lengths is used), and left greasey (lanolin grease) because this protects against some degradation when introduced into the very high alkaline plaster. Before use it must be well beaten, or teased, to separate the lumps. In America, goats' hair is frequently used, though it is not so strong as ox-hair. The quantity used in good work is one pound of hair to two or three cubic feet of coarse stuff (in the UK up to 12 kg per metric cube). Hair reinforcement in lime plaster is common and many types of hair and other organic fibres can be found in historic plasters [4]. However, organic material in lime will degrade in damp environments particularly on damp external renders.[5] This problem has given rise to the use of polyprolene fibres and cellulose wood fibres in new lime renders [6]

Manila hemp fiber has been used as a substitute for hair. Plaster for hair slabs made with manila hemp fiber broke at 195 lb (88 kg), plaster mixed with sisal hemp at 150 lb (68 kg), jute at 145 lb (66 kg), and goats' hair at 144 lb (65 kg). Another test was made in the following manner. Two barrels of mortar were made up of equal proportions of lime and sand, one containing the usual quantity of goats' hair, and the other Manila fiber. After remaining in a dry cellar for nine months the barrels were opened. It was found that the hair had been almost entirely eaten away by the action of the lime, and the mortar consequently broke up and crumbled quite easily. The mortar containing the Manila hemp, on the other hand, showed great cohesion, and required some effort to pull it apart, the hemp fiber being undamaged.

==== Sand/aggregate ====
For fine plasterer's sand-work, special sands are used, such as silver sand, which is used when a light color and fine texture are required. In the United Kingdom this fine white sand is procured chiefly from Leighton Buzzard; also in the UK many traditional plasters had crushed chalk as the aggregate, this made a very flexible plaster suitable for timber-frame buildings.

For external work Portland cement is the best material on account of its strength, durability, and weather resisting external properties, but not on historic structures that are required to flex and breathe; for this, lime without cement is used.

Sawdust has been used as a substitute for hair and also instead of sand as an aggregate. Sawdust will enable mortar to stand the effects of frost and rough weather. It is useful sometimes for heavy cornices and similar work, as it renders the material light and strong. The sawdust should be used dry. The sawdust is used to bind the mix sometimes to make it go further.

== Methods ==
The first coat or rendering is from 1/2 to 3/4 inches thick, and is mixed in the proportions of from one part of cement to two of sand to one part to five of sand. The finishing or setting coat is about 3/16 inches thick, and is worked with a hand float on the surface of the rendering, which must first be well wetted.

=== External plastering ===
Stucco is a term loosely applied to nearly all kinds of external plastering, whether composed of lime or of cement. At the present time it has fallen into disfavor, but in the early part of the 19th century a great deal of this work was done. Cement has largely superseded lime for this work. The principal varieties of stucco are common, rough, trowelled and bastard. .

- Common stucco for external work is usually composed of one part hydraulic lime and three parts sand. The wall should be sufficiently rough to form a key and well wetted to prevent the moisture being absorbed from the plaster.
- Rough stucco is used to imitate stonework. It is worked with a hand float covered with rough felt (a stiff bristled brush can also be used), which forms a sand surface on the plaster. Lines are ruled before the stuff is set to represent the joints of stonework.
- Trowelled stucco, the finishing coat of this work, consists of three parts sand to two parts fine stuff. A very fine smooth surface is produced by means of the hand float.
- Bastard stucco is of similar composition, but less labor is expended on it. It is laid on in two coats with a skimming float, scoured off at once, and then trowelled.
- Colored stucco: lime stucco may be executed in colors, the desired tints being obtained by mixing with the lime various oxides. Black and grays are obtained by using forge ashes in varying proportions, greens by green enamel, reds by using litharge or red lead, and blues by mixing oxide or carbonate of copper with the other materials.

Roughcast or pebbledash plastering is a rough form of external plastering in much use for country houses. In Scotland it is termed "harling". It is one of the oldest forms of external plastering. In Tudor times it was employed to fill in between the woodwork of half-timbered framing. When well executed with good material this kind of plastering is very durable.

Roughcasting is performed by first rendering the wall or laths with a coat of well-haired coarse stuff composed either of good hydraulic lime or of Portland cement. This layer is well scratched to give a key for the next coat. The second coat is also composed of coarse stuff knocked up to a smooth and uniform consistency. Two finish two techniques can be used:

- dry dash: while the first coat is still soft, gravel, shingle or other small stones are evenly thrown on with a small scoop and then brushed over with thin lime mortar to give a uniform surface. The shingle is often dipped in hot lime paste, well stirred up, and used as required.
- wet dash: the traditional roughcast, harling the scratch or undercoat is left to cure and in the final coat the gravel/agrigate is mixed with the lime and sand and thrown on with the plaster spoon/scoop.

=== Sgraffito (scratched ornament) ===
Sgraffito is the name for scratched ornament in plaster. Scratched ornament is the oldest form of surface decoration, and is much used on the continent of Europe, especially in Germany and Italy, in both external and internal situations.

Properly treated, the work is durable, effective and inexpensive. A first coat or rendering of Portland cement and sand, in the proportion of one to three, is laid on about an inch thick; then follows the color coat, sometimes put on in patches of different tints as required for the finished design. When this coat is nearly dry, it is finished with a smooth-skimming, 1/12 to 1/8 inch (2.1 to 3.2 mm) thick, of Parian, selenitic or other fine cement or lime, only as much as can be finished in one day being laid on.

Then by pouncing through the pricked cartoon, the design is transferred to the plastered surface. Broad spaces of background are now exposed by removing the finishing coat, thus revealing the colored plaster beneath, and following this the outlines of the rest of the design are scratched with an iron knife through the outer skimming to the underlying tinted surface.

Sometimes the coats are in three different colors, such as brown for the first, red for the second, and white or grey for the final coat. The pigments used for this work include Indian red, Turkey red, Antwerp blue, German blue, umber, ochre, purple brown, bone black or oxide of manganese for black. Combinations of these colors are made to produce any desired tone.

=== Coats ===
Plasters are applied in successive coats or layers on walls or lathing and gains its name from the number of these coats.

- One coat work is the coarsest and cheapest class of plastering, and is limited to inferior buildings, such as outhouses, where merely a rough coating is required to keep out the weather and draughts. This is described as render on brickwork, and lath and lay or lath and plaster one coat on studding.
- Two-coat work is often used for factories or warehouses and the less important rooms of residences. The first coat is of coarse stuff finished fair with the darby float and scoured. A thin coat of setting stuff is then laid on, and trowelled and brushed smooth. Two-coat work is described as render and set on walls, and lath, plaster and set, or lath, lay and set on laths.
- Three-coat work is usually specified for high specification work. It consists, as its name implies, of three layers of material, and is described as render, float and set on walls and lath, plaster, float and set, or lath, lay, float and set, on lathwork. This makes a strong, straight, sanitary coating for walls and ceilings.

The process for three coat work is as follows:

- For the first coat a layer of well-haired coarse stuff, about 1 inch thick, is put on with the laying trowel. This is termed "pricking up" in London, and in America "scratch coating". It should be laid on diagonally, each trowelful overlapping the previous one. When on laths the stuff should be plastic enough to be worked through the spaces between the laths to form a key, yet so firm as not to drop off. The surface while still soft is scratched with a lath to give a key for the next coat. In Scotland this part of the process is termed "straightening" and in America "browning", and is performed when the first coat is dry, so as to form a straight surface to receive the finishing coat.
- The second or "floating coat", and is 1/4 to 3/8 inches thick. Four operations are involved in laying the second coat, namely, forming the screeds; filling in the spaces between the screeds; scouring the surface; keying the face for finishing.
  - Wall screeds are plumbed and ceiling screeds leveled. Screeds are narrow strips of plastering, carefully plumbed and leveled, so as to form a guide upon which the floating rule is run, thus securing a perfectly horizontal or vertical surface, or, in the case of circular work, a uniform curve.
  - The filling in, or flanking, consists of laying the spaces between the screeds with coarse stuff, which is brought flush with the level of the screeds with the floating rule.
  - The scouring of the floating coat is of great importance, for it consolidates the material, and, besides hardening it, prevents it from cracking. It is done by the plasterer with a hand float that he applies vigorously with a rapid circular motion, at the same time sprinkling the work with water from a stock brush in the other hand. Any small holes or inequalities are filled up as he proceeds. The whole surface should be uniformly scoured two or three times, with an interval between each operation of from six to twenty-four hours. This process leaves the plaster with a close-grained and fairly smooth surface, offering little or no key to the coat that is to follow.
  - To obtain proper cohesion, however, a roughened face is necessary, and this is obtained by keying the surface with a wire brush or nail float, that is, a hand float with the point of a nail sticking through and projecting about 1/8 inch; sometimes a point is put at each corner of the float.
- After the floating is finished to the walls and ceiling, the next part of internal plastering is the running of the cornice, followed by the finishing of the ceiling and walls.
- The third and final coat is the setting coat, which should be about 1/8 inch thick. In Scotland it is termed the "finishing coat", and in America the "hard finish coat" or "putty coat". Setting stuff should not be applied until the floating is quite firm and nearly dry, but it must not be too dry or the moisture will be drawn from the setting stuff.

The composition of an interior three coat plaster:

- The coarse stuff applied as the first coat is composed of sand and lime, usually in proportions approximating to two to one, with hair mixed into it in quantities of about a pound to two or three cubic feet of mortar. It should be mixed with clean water to such a consistency that a quantity picked up on the point of a trowel holds well together and does not drop.
- Floating stuff is of finer texture than that used for pricking up, and is used in a softer state, enabling it to be worked well into the keying of the first coat. A smaller proportion of hair is also used.
- Fine stuff mixed with sand is used for the setting coat. Fine stuff, or lime putty, is pure lime that has been slaked and then mixed with water to a semi-fluid consistency, and allowed to stand until it has developed into a soft paste.
  - For use in setting it is mixed with fine washed sand in the ratio of one to three.
  - For cornices and for setting when the second coat is not allowed time to dry properly, a special compound must be used. This is often gauged stuff, composed of three or four parts of lime putty and one part of plaster of Paris, mixed up in small quantities immediately before use. The plaster in the material causes it to set rapidly, but if it is present in too large a proportion the work will crack in setting.

The hard cements used for plastering, such as Parian, Keene's, and Martin's, are laid generally in two coats, the first of cement and sand 1/2 to 3/4 inches thick, the second or setting coat of neat cement about 1/8 inch thick. These and similar cements have gypsum as a base, to which a certain proportion of another substance, such as alum, borax or carbonate of soda, is added, and the whole baked or calcined at a low temperature. The plaster they contain causes them to set quickly with a very hard smooth surface, which may be painted or papered within a few hours of its being finished.

In Australia, plaster or cement render that is applied to external brickwork on dwellings or commercial buildings can be one or two coats. In two coat render a base coat is applied with a common mix of 4 parts sand to one part cement and one part dehydrated lime and water to make a consistent mortar. Render is applied using a hawk and trowel and pushed on about 12 mm thick to begin. For two coat, some plasterers apply two full depth bands of render (one at the base of the wall and one around chest height) which are screeded plumb and square and allowed to dry while applying the first coat over the remaining exposed wall. The render is then scratched to provide a key for the second coat. This method allows the rest of the wall to be rendered and screeded off without the need to continually check if the second coat is plumb. Alternatively, both coats can be applied with the plasterer using a t-bar to screed the final coat until it is plumb, straight and square. The first method is generally used where quality of finish is at a premium. The second method is quicker but can be several millimetres out of plumb. The second coat can be a slightly weaker mix 5/1/1, or the same as the base coat with maybe a water- proofer in the mix added to the water to minimize efflorescence (rising of salts). Some plasterers used lime putty in second coat instead of dehydrated lime in the render. The mortar is applied to about 5 mm thick and when the render hardens is screeded off straight. A wood float or plastic float is used to rub down the walls. Traditionally, water is splashed on walls using a coarse horsehair plasterers brush followed by immediately rubbing the float in a circular or figure 8 motion although a figure of 8 can leave marks. Many modern plasterers use a hose with a special nozzle with a fine mist spray to dampen walls when rubbing up (using a wood float to bring a consistent finish). Using a hose brings a superior finish and is more consistent in colour as there is more chance in catching the render before it has a chance to harden too much. After the work area is floated, the surface is finished with a wet sponge using the same method as floating with a wood float, bringing sand to the surface to give a smooth consistent finish.

Materials used in the render are commonly local sands with little clay content with fine to coarse grains. Sand finish is common for external render and may be one or two coats. Plasterers use a t-bar to screed the walls until it is plumb, straight and square. Two coat is superior as, although more expensive, it gives a more consistent finish and has less chance of becoming drummy or cracking. Drumminess occurs when the render doesn't bond completely with the wall, either because the wall is too smooth, a coat is too thick, or the coat is being floated when the render has hardened too much, leaving an air space that makes a drumming sound when a metal tool is "rubbed" over it.

For internal walls, two coats is the standard and follows the same method as for external rendering but with a weaker mix of five or six sand to one cement and one lime. However, instead of being finished with a sponge, the second coat is left rough and sometimes will be scored by nails inserted in the float. After drying, the surface is then scraped to remove loose grains of sand before plastering. If the walls are concrete, a splash coat is needed to ensure bonding. A splash coat is a very wet mix of two parts cement to one part sand that is "splashed" on the wall using the plasterers brush until the wall is covered. Special mixes are sometimes required for architectural or practical reasons. For example, A hospital's X-ray room will be rendered with a mix containing Barium sulfate to make the walls impervious to x-rays.

=== Moldings ===
Plain, or unenriched, moldings are formed with a running mold of zinc cut to the required profile a process that has remained the same for over 200 years.

- For a cornice molding two running rules are usual, one on the wall, the other on the ceiling, upon which the mold is worked to and from by one workman, while another man roughly lays on the plaster to the shape of the molding. The miters at the angles are finished off with joint rules made of sheet steel of various lengths, three or four inches (102 mm) wide, and about one-eighth inch thick, with one end cut to an angle of about 30°. In some cases the steel plate is let into a stock or handle of hardwood.

Enrichments may be moldings added after the main outline molding is set, and are cast in molds made of gelatin or plaster of Paris.

=== Cracks ===
Cracks in plastering may be caused by settlement of the building, by the use of inferior materials or by bad workmanship.

However, due to none of these, cracks may yet ensue by the too fast drying of the work, caused through the laying of plaster on dry walls which suck from the composition the moisture required to enable it to set, by the application of external heat or the heat of the sun, by the laying of a coat upon one which has not properly set, the cracking in this case being caused by unequal contraction, or by the use of too small a proportion of sand.

In older properties, hairline cracks in plastered ceilings can occur due to minor deflection / movement of timber joists which support the floor above.

Traditionally, crack propagation was arrested by stirring chopped horsehair thoroughly into the plaster mix.

=== Slabs ===
For partitions and ceilings, plaster slabs are used to finish quickly. For ceilings metal lathing require simply to be nailed to the joists, the joints being made with plaster, and the whole finished with a thin setting coat or slab. In some cases, with fireproof ceilings, for instance, the metal lathing are hung up with wire hangers so as to allow a space of several inches between the soffit of the concrete floor and the ceiling. For partitions metal laths are grouted in with semi-fluid plaster. Where very great strength is required, the work may be reinforced by small iron rods through the slabs. This forms a very strong and rigid partition which is at the same time fire-resisting and of lightweight, and when finished measures only from two to four inches (102 mm) thick. So strong is the result that partitions of this class only two or three inches (76 mm) thick were used for temporary cells for prisoners at Newgate Gaol during the rebuilding of the new sessions house in the Old Bailey in London.

The slabs may be obtained either with a keyed surface, which requires finishing with a setting coat when the partition or ceiling is in position, or a smooth finished face, which may be papered or painted immediately the joints have been carefully made.

=== Fibrous plaster ===
Fibrous plaster is given by plasterers the suggestive name "stick and rag", and this is a rough description of the material, for it is a fibrous composed of plaster laid upon a backing of canvas stretched on wood. It is much used for moldings, circular and enriched casings to columns and girders and ornamental work, which is worked in the shop and fixed in position.

Desachy, a French modeler, took out in 1856 a patent for "producing architectural moldings, ornaments and other works of art, with surfaces of plaster," with the aid of plaster, glue, wood, wire, and canvas or other woven fabric.

The modern use of this material may be said to have started then, but the use of fibrous plaster was known and practiced by the Egyptians long before the Christian era; for ancient coffins and mummies still preserved prove that linen stiffened with plaster was used for decorating coffins and making masks. Cennino Cennini, writing in 1437, says that fine linen soaked in glue and plaster and laid on wood was used for forming grounds for painting.

Canvas and mortar were in general use in Great Britain up to the middle of the 20th century. This work is also much used for temporary work, such as exhibition buildings.

== Plastering ==
=== Modern interior plastering techniques ===
There are two main methods in USA used in construction of the interior walls of modern homes, plasterboard, also called drywall, and veneer plastering.

In plasterboard a specialized form of sheet rock known as "greenboard" (because on the outer paper coating is greenish) is screwed onto the wall-frames (studs) of the home to form the interior walls. At the place where the two edges of wallboards meet there is a seam. These seams are covered with mesh tape and then the seams and the screw heads are concealed with the drywall compound to make the wall seem as one uniform piece. The drywall plaster is a thick paste. Later this is painted or wallpapered over to hide the work. This process is typically called "taping" and those who use drywall are known as "tapers".

Veneer plastering covers the entire wall with thin liquid plaster, uses a great deal of water and is applied very wet. The walls intended to be plastered are hanged with "Blueboard" (named as such for the industry standard of the outer paper being blue-grey in color). This type of sheet rock is designed to absorb some of the moisture of the plaster and thus allow it to cling the plaster better before it sets.

Veneer plastering is a one-shot one-coat application; taping usually requires sanding and then adding another coat, since the compound shrinks as it dries.

=== Traditional plastering ===
The plasterer usually shows up after the hangers have finished building all the internal walls, by attaching blueboard over the frames of the house with screws. The plasterer is usually a subcontractor working in crews that average about three veterans and one laborer. The job of the laborer is to set up ahead of and clean up behind the plasterers, so they can concentrate on spreading the "mud" on the walls.

==== Laborer's tasks ====
- Debris left on the floors from the "hanging" crew must be removed before floor paper can be set down and to remove any tripping hazards.
- Cover the floors with tar or brown paper since plaster can stain or be hard to remove from subflooring plywood.
- Run hoses and extension cords and set up job lights.
- Cover all seams with meshtape as well as any large gaps around outlets caused by poor roto-zip work. Gouge out any bubble in the wallboard caused by broken sheetrock under the paper and cover the holes with meshtape. Remove any loose screws (flies) left from the hanger missing the underlying frame.
- Cover all windows and doors with plastic sheets and masking tape to protect the wood of their frames and save on cleaning. If any plumbing fixtures or wall plugs have been installed they are also covered, as well as the bathtubs and showers.
- Set up for the next mix. As soon as the table is cleared the laborer is given instructions of how many bags will be needed as well as the next room to be worked in. The table typically consists of folding legs upon which is set a square board of wood and then covered in a plastic sheet upon which the plaster is placed in the center in a large pile.
- Mixing the product. The mixing barrel is usually pre-filled to a certain level with water; since it can take some time to fill. The amount of water is usually estimated (with a margin of error leaning towards too little). The amount of water required is obtained from the amount of bags planned to be mixed. The estimation is not difficult for an experienced plasterer; who knows how many sheets he can typically cover, and that one bag usually covers 2 & 1/2 to 3 sheets and 5 gallons of water is needed for one standard 50 pound bag. With a permanent crew that normally does the same amount per mix one can simply fill up the barrel to a known cut-off point.
- Once the mix is set up and the plasterers are ready they instruct the laborer to start dumping the bags in the water barrel, while intermittently running the mixing drill. Once all bags are in the barrel more water is slowly added until the plaster is of proper consistency and is then thoroughly mixed. Before the mixing is completed, a margin trowel (or margin for short) is scraped along the inside wall of the barrel to knock off clinging unmixed clumps (known as cutting in) to be furthered mixed until all is homogeneous.
- While mixing the drill is slowly brought up and down and follows the edge of the barrel in a circular motion to drag the top of the mix down and ensure an even consistency throughout the mix. Care is taken not to allow the drill's paddle to hit the bottom or sides of the barrel; this can scrape off plastic bits that end up in the mix. At a certain point before the mixing is done a margin trowel is again used to scrape any clinging dry plaster into the rest of the mix. typically this is when the accelerator; if used is added. Mixing can be fatigueing in that the drill tends to not only be heavy but the mixer must also fight the torc of the paddle.
- Shovel the mix onto the table. The mixing barrel must be emptied as soon as possible, as the plaster will set faster in the barrel then on the table. but the table cannot be overfilled or it may tip or plaster will spill off the sides and splatter when it hits the floor. While shoveling care must also be taken not to splatter any plaster onto nearby walls.
- Clean up the mix barrel. This is done outside with a hose and nozzle. If any plaster remains they can contaminate the next mix with "rocks" that greatly vex the plasterers as they get dragged across the walls and the contamination causes the plaster to set much quicker.
- Final clean up. This includes rolling up all paper flooring in finished rooms. knocking the plaster out of plug outlet holes with a drywall hammer/hatchet, taking down any masking tape and plastic, cleaning up any plaster that has splattered onto the floor etc.

==== Plasterer's tasks ====
Normally the contractor has already supplied all the bags of Gypsum plaster that will be needed, as well as any external supply of water if the house is not yet connected. The plastering crew needs to bring their own tools and equipment and sometimes supply their own bead.

The Tasks that the plasterer is usually expected to accomplish.

- Hang cornerbead

The plasterer usually must first staple or tack Cornerbead onto every protruding (external) corner of the inside of the house. Care is taken to make sure this makes the wall look straight and is more of a skill of the eye than anything else.

  - "Bead" comes in many styles; Ranging from wire mesh attached by staples to heavier metal grades that need to be tacked on with nails. Plastic varieties also exist.
  - The bead must be measured and cut to size; care is taken not to bend or warp it. In places where more than one corner meets; the bead's ends are cut at an angle and the 2 or more tips are placed as close together as allowable; touching but not overlapping. The bead is completely covered with plaster as well as the rest of the wall and the plaster also helps to hold it firm. The finished product leaves only a small exposed metal strip at the protrusion of the corner which gets covered when the wall is painted. This leaves a clean, straight looking corner.
  - An alternative method seen in older houses of forming a rounded or bullnosed corner uses a quirked wooden staff bead. The staff bead, a 1-inch dowel with approx 1/3 shaved off the back, is set on the external corner by the joiner on site, fastened to wooden plugs set into the brick/block seams, or to the wood frame. Plaster is run up to the staff bead and then cut back locally to the bead or "quirked" to avoid a weak feather edge where the plaster meets the bead.
  - In architecture a quirk is a small V-shaped channel used to insulate and give relief to a convex rounded moulding. To create the plastered corner, backing coat (browning) is plastered up to the staff bead, then the quirk is cut into the backing coat a little larger than the finished size. When the top skimming coat is applied, again the bead is fully skimmed in and then, using a straight edge, the quirk is re-cut to the finished depth, usually on an approximate 45 degree angle into the bead. The quirk will hide the eventual small crack that will form between the staff bead and plaster.
- Set up tools

The plasterer needs to fill a 5-gallon bucket partway with water. From this bucket he hangs his trowel or trowels and places into it various tools.

  - Normally a plasterer has one trowel for "laying on" (the process of placing mud onto the wall).
  - Some then keep an older trowel that has a decent bend in it (banana curve) to be used for the purpose of "texturing"; if called for by the homeowner. A lay-on trowel tends to be too flat for this and the vacuum caused by the water can stick it to the wall, forcing him to tear it off and thus he has to rework the area.
  - Finally, one may have a brand new trowel "not yet broken-in" which he will use for "grinding"; this is when the plaster is nearly hardened and he is smoothing out any bumps or filling in any small dips (cat faces) to make the wall look like a uniform sheet of glossy white plaster.

Most plasterers have their own preference for the size of the trowel they use. some wield trowels as large as 20 inches long but the norm seems to be a 16"×5".

Into the bucket also goes a large brush used to splash water onto the wall and to clean his tools, a paint brush for smoothing corners, and a corner bird for forming corners.

These tool buckets are first kept near the mix table and then as the plaster starts to set are moved closer to the wall that is being worked on. Time becomes a big factor here as once the plaster starts to harden (set) it will do so fairly rapidly and the plasterer has a small margin of error to get the wall smooth.

Onto the mixing table the plasterer usually sets his "hawk" so it will be handy when he needs to grab it and to keep dirt off of it. Any debris in the plaster can become a major nuisance.

- Plaster tops or bottom?

Plasterers will typically divide a room, (especially a large or high-ceilinged wall) into top and bottom. The one working on top will do from the ceiling's edge to about belly height and work off a milk crate for an 8-foot (2.4 m) ceiling, or work off stilts for 12-foot-high rooms. For cathedral ceilings or very high walls, staging is set up and one works topside, the others further below.

- Clean up before they finish a job

Typically done with the laborer. No plaster globs left on the floors, walls or corner bead edges. (They will show up if painted and interfere with flooring and trim). Remove or neatly stack all trash.

- Inspection

All rooms and walls are inspected for cracking and dents or scratches that may have been caused from others bumping into the walls. They are also inspected to make sure no bumps are left on the walls from splashed plaster or water. All rooms are checked to make sure all plaster is knocked out of the outlets so the electrician can install the sockets and to make sure no tools are left behind. This leaves the walls ready for the painters and finishers to come in and do their trade.

==== Interior plastering techniques ====
===== Smooth =====
The home owner and the plasterer's boss will usually decide beforehand what styles they will use in the house. Typically walls are smooth and sometimes ceilings. Usually a homeowner will opt to have the ceilings use a "texture" technique as it is much easier, faster, and thus cheaper than a smooth ceiling.

The plasterer quotes prices based on techniques to be used and board feet to be covered to the contractor or homeowner before work begins. The board feet is obtained by the hangers or estimated by the head subcontractor by counting the wallboards that come in an industry standard of 8' to 12' long. He then adds in extra expenses for soffits and cathedral ceilings.

- Ceiling second or first

Typically if the ceiling is to be smooth it is done first, before the walls. If it is to be textured, it is done after the walls.

The reason for this is that invariably when a ceiling is being worked on plaster will fall and splash onto the walls. However a texture mix doesn't need to be smoothed out when it starts to set:

- thus a retardant such as "Cream of tartar" or sugar can be used to prolong the setting time, and is easily scraped off the walls.
- and since time is not as restraining of a factor on textured ceilings a large mix, or back-to-back mixes can be done and all ceilings covered at the same time.
- another reason is that a bird is usually run along the top corner after doing a smooth ceiling, then it is easier to maintain this edge by doing the wall last. But a textured ceiling normally doesn't need to be birded, only blended in with a very wet paint brush. In this case the wall is done first and the corner formed with the bird.
- Scratching

The first thing the plasterer tends to do is go over all the mesh-taped seams of the walls he is about to cover; in a very thin swatch. The wallboard draws moisture out of this strip so when the plasterer goes over it again when doing the rest of the wall it will not leave an indented seam that needs further reworking.

He then fills in the area near the ceiling so he will not have to stretch to reach it during the rest of the wall; And he forms the corner with his bird. This saves much needed time as this process is a race against the chemical reaction.

- Laying on

From the mix table the plasterer scoops some "mud" onto the center of his hawk with his trowel. Holding the hawk in his off-hand and his trowel in his primary the plasterer then scoops a bulging roll of plaster onto his trowel. this takes a bit of practice to master, especially with soupy mixes.

Then holding the trowel parallel to the wall and at a slight angle of the wrist he tries to uniformly roll the plaster onto the wall. In a manner similar to a squeegee. He starts about an inch above the floor and works his way upwards to the ceiling. Care is taken to be uniform as possible as it helps in the finishing phase.

- Knocking down

Depending on the setting time of the plaster. once the moisture of the plaster starts to be drawn by the board a second pass is made. this is called knocking down. it is much like applying paint with a roller in wrist action and purpose. to smooth out any lines and fill in any major voids that will make extra work once the plaster starts to truly set. very little pressure is applied and the trowel is kept relatively flat towards the wall.

- Setting

Sometimes an accelerant will be added to a mix to hasten the time delay from the initial mixing phase to when the plaster starts to set. This is normally done on cold days when setting is delayed or for small jobs to minimize the wait.

Once the plaster is on the wall and starts to set (this can be determined by the table that sets first), the plasterer gingerly sprinkles water onto the wall; this helps to stall the setting and to create a slip. He then uses his trowel and often a wetted felt brush held in the opposite hand and lightly touching the wall ahead of the trowel to work this slip into any small gaps (known as "catfaces") in the plaster as well as smooth out the rough lay-on and flatten any air bubbles that formed during setting.

This is a crucial time because if the wall gets too hard it is nearly impossible to fill in any gaps as the slip will no longer set with the wall and will instead just dry and fall out. This leads to the need of what is called "grinding" as one must go over the hard wall again and again trying to smooth out the hardened wall and any major catfaces must be filled in with a contour putty, joint compound, or reworked by blending in a fresh, thin coat.

The finished wall will look glossy and uniformly flat and is smooth to the touch. After a few days it will become chalky white and can then be painted over.

- Mix

From the time the bags are dumped into the barrel to when the wall is completely set is called a mix. Varying on the technique used and whether accelerant or retardant is added, a mix typically lasts about two hours.

The final moments are the most frantic if it is smooth or if the mix sets quicker than anticipated. If this happens it is said the mix has "snapped" and is normally due to using old product or various types of weather (humidity or hot days can cause plaster to set quicker). Normally only three or four mixes are done in a day as plastering is very tiring and not as effective under unnatural lighting in the months with early dusk.

- Seasons

Plastering is done year round but unique problems may arise from season to season. In the summer, the heat tends to cause the plaster to set faster. The plaster also generates its own heat and houses can become quite hellish. Typically the plaster crew will try to arrive at the house well before dawn.

In winter months, short days cause the need of artificial lighting. At certain angles these lights can make even the smoothest wall look like the surface of the moon. Another dilemma in the winter months is needing to use propane jet heaters (which can stain the plaster yellowish but do not otherwise hurt it), not just to keep the plasterers warm but to also prevent the water in the mix from freezing and generating ice crystals before the plaster has time to set. Also if the water hose is not thoroughly drained before leaving it can freeze over night and be completely stopped up in the morning.

===== Textured =====
Texturing is usually reserved for closets, ceilings and garage walls.

Typically a retarding agent is added to the mix. this is normally Cream of Tartar (or "Dope" in the plasterer's jargon) and care must be taken with the amount added. Too much and the mix may never set at all. However the amount used is often estimated; much the way one adds a dash of salt to a recipe. you add a small scoop of retarder, dependent on the size of the mix. Retardant is added so that larger mixes can be made, since the texture technique doesn't require the person to wait until it starts to set before working it.

The lay-on phase is the same as smooth but it is added with a thicker coat. Once the coat is on uniformly the plasterer then goes back and birds his corners. Staying away from the corner he then gets a trowel with a nice banana curve in it and starts to run it over the wall in a figure eight or Ess pattern, making sure to cross all areas at least once. He adds a little extra plaster to his trowel if needed. The overall effect is layers of paint-like swaths over the whole of the ceiling or wall. He can then just walk away and let it set with care taken not too leave any globs and to make sure the corners look smooth and linear.

If a wall is to be smooth and the ceiling textured, typically the wall is done first, then the ceiling after the wall has set. Instead of rebirding the ceiling (which would have been done when the wall was laid on), a clean trowel is held against the wall and its corner is run along the ceiling to "cut it in" and clean the wall at the same time. This line is then smoothed with a paintbrush to make the transition seamless.

===== Sponge =====
The sponge (technically called a float), has a circle form and rough surface. it is fixed to a backing with a central handhold and is roughly the size of a standard trowel. Sponge is a variant texture technique and used normally on ceilings and sometimes in closets. Typically when using a sponge; sand is added to the mix and the technique is called sand-sponge.

Care must be taken not to stand directly under your trowel when doing this, as it can result in a sand or grit getting into the eyes, causing irritation and potential damage to the eyes.

The lay-on and mix is the same as with regular texturing. however after a uniform and smooth coat is placed on the ceiling and the edges are cut in; a special rectangular sponge with a handle is run across the ceiling in overlapping and circular motions. This takes some skill and practice to do well.

The overall look is a fishscale type pattern on the ceiling, closet wall, etc. Even though retarder is typically used; care must be taken to clean out the sponge thoroughly when finished as any plaster that hardens inside it will be impossible to remove.

===== Ceilings =====
Stilts are often required to plaster most ceilings and it is typically harder to lay-on and work than walls. For short ceilings one can also work with milk crates. The difficulty of working upside down often results in plaster bombs splattering on the floors, walls and people below.

This is why smooth ceilings, that use no retardant and sometimes even accelerant, are done before the walls. Retarded plaster can easily be scraped off a smooth plaster wall when wet. Any splatters from a smooth ceiling can easily be scraped off bare blueboard but not from an already plastered wall. Care must be taken when standing under your trowel or another plasterer.

The general difficulty of working a smooth ceiling fetches a higher cost. The technique is the same as a smooth wall but at an awkward angle for the plasterer.

==== Tools of the trade ====
- Broom
- Bucket trowel
- Cornerbead
- corner bird
- Display bird-can be set for wider than 90 degree angles
- Drywall Hammer or Drywall Hatchet -- use to clear plaster globs out of plugholes.
- extension cords
- 5 gallon buckets-for tools, washing, steps/stools, for small patch mixes, lugging plaster onto staging etc.
- Floor scraper -- Optional
- Gauging trowel
- Halogen work lights
- Hawk (plasterer's tool)
- High RPM mixing drill with appropriate paddle
- ladders and a few 6×4 planks-supplemental
- masking tape -- for window panes and door jambs
- mesh tape--multiple rolls
- Milk crate -- used to store tools and as stools
- Multi cord outlet
- Pipe Staging-supplemental
- Plastic 30 to 50 gallon drum-For mixing, often obtained from car washes
- putty knife --supplemental
- Scoop -supplemental-- to remove plaster from a bucket
- Shovel -- short handled, is used to load the table with plaster mud.
- soft bristle paintbrush -- for smoothing edges and corners
- Trowels--various sizes and levels of breaking-in (cost avg $60)
- Margin Trowel or margin for short—for edging the mix barrel
- Spat or spatula trowel
- sponge (tool)/Float
- Staple gun -- for corner bead
- table stand and a table board
- tar paper or brown paper rolls—tar paper offers more water protection and is a bit more resilient but is costlier to use.
- roll of plastic sheeting
- Gypsum based plaster
- DIAMOND Basecoat -- used in cases where cracking is suspected to occur, deep fill-ins
- Utility knife--to cut plastic sheeting for table boards and floor covering paper
- Water hose and nozzle
- Water brush – large, for cleaning tools and splashing walls

steel straight edge (used for leveling rendered walls and lining plasterboard)

== Examples ==
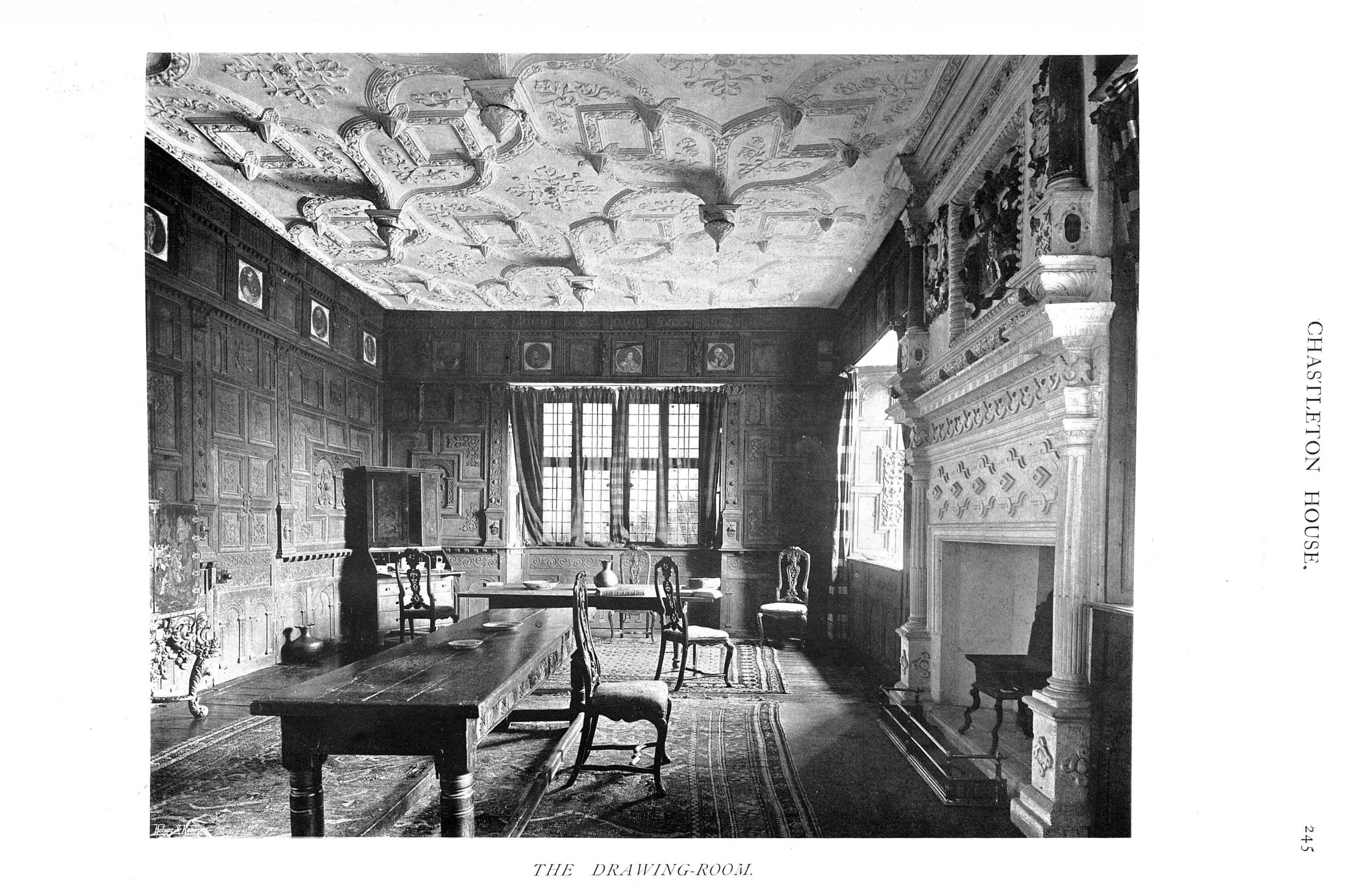
Modelled plasterwork ceiling in Chastleton House, England

In England, fine examples of plasterwork interiors of the early modern period can be seen at Chastleton House, (Oxfordshire), Knole House, (Kent), Wilderhope Manor (Shropshire), Speke Hall, (Merseyside), and Haddon Hall, (Derbyshire).

Some examples of outstanding extant historical plasterwork interiors are found in Scotland, where the three finest specimens of interior plasterwork are elaborate decorated ceilings from the early 17th century at Muchalls Castle, Glamis Castle and Craigievar Castle, all of which are in the northeast region of that country.

The craft of modelled plasterwork, inspired by the style of the early modern period, was revived by the designers of the Arts and Crafts movement in late-19th- and early-20th-century England. Notable practitioners were Ernest Gimson, his pupil Norman Jewson, and George P. Bankart, who published extensively on the subject. Examples are preserved today at Owlpen Manor and Rodmarton Manor, both in the Cotswolds.

Modern ornate fibrous plasterwork by the specialist company of Clark & Fenn can be seen at Theatre Royal, Drury Lane, the London Palladium, Grand Theatre Leeds, Somerset House, The Plaisterers' Hall and St. Clement Danes

Corrado Parducci was a notable plaster worker in the Detroit area during the middle half of the 20th century. Probably his best known ceiling is located at Meadow Brook Hall.

== See also ==
- Anaglypta
- Cast Courts – Galleries in the Victoria and Albert Museum
- Cement render
- Gypsum board
- Limepit
- Lincrusta
- Pargeting
- Plaster
- Qadad
- Roughcast
- Stucco
