= The Hawks =

The Hawks may refer to:

- The Hawks (band), a back-up band of singer Ronnie Hawkins
  - The Band, or "Levon & The Hawks", which originated from the Hawks
- The Hawks, a band with British musical artist Stephen Duffy
- The Hawks (South Africa), The South African Police Services' Directorate for Priority Crime Investigation (DPCI)
- Atlanta Hawks, an American professional basketball team
- Illawarra Hawks, an Australian professional basketball team
- Hawthorn Hawks, an Australian Football League club

== See also ==
- Hawks (disambiguation)
