= HMAS Hawk =

Two ships of the Royal Australian Navy (RAN) have been named HMAS Hawk:

- HMAS Hawk, formerly HMAS Vigilant, an auxiliary patrol boat commissioned in 1940 and operating under the Hawk name from March until November 1945, when she was decommissioned
- HMAS Hawk (M 1139), formerly HMS Gamston and HMS Somerlyton, was commissioned into the RAN in 1961, and decommissioned in 1972

== Battle honours ==
Ships named HMAS Hawk are entitled to carry a single battle honour:

- Malaysia 1964–66

== See also ==
- HMS Hawk, several ships of the Royal Navy
- USS Hawk, several ships of the United States Navy
