= Sea Hawk =

Sea Hawk or Seahawk may refer to:

== Birds ==
- Osprey, a diurnal, fish-eating bird of prey
- Skua, a group of seabirds comprising seven species

== Art, entertainment, and media ==
- Sea Hawk, a recurring guest character from the animated television series She-Ra: Princess of Power and its reboot, She-Ra and the Princesses of Power
- The Sea Hawk, a 1915 novel by Rafael Sabatini
  - The Sea Hawk (1924 film), film based on the novel, starring Milton Sills
  - The Sea Hawk (1940 film), film inspired by the novel, starring Errol Flynn
- Sea Hawks (TV series), an Indian series broadcast by DD National
- USS Seahawk CVN-65, a fictional aircraft carrier on the TV series JAG
- Sea Hawk, a 1987 shooter video game released by Froggo

== Vehicular ==
=== Aircraft ===
- Curtiss F7C Seahawk, a carrier-capable biplane fighter aircraft of the United States Navy in the late 1920s and early 1930s
- Curtiss SC Seahawk, a World War II United States Navy scout floatplane
- Hawker Sea Hawk, a British carrier-based fighter aircraft of the 1950s built by Armstrong Whitworth
- Sikorsky SH-60 Seahawk, an American helicopter used by the U.S. Navy
- Wüst Seahawk, a German amateur-built flying boat design
- Y2Fly Seahawk, an ultralight flying boat

=== Ships ===
- USS Sea Hawk (SP-2365), a United States Navy patrol boat in commission from 1917 to 1919
- USV Seahawk, a medium uncrewed surface vessel of the United States Navy, a Sea Hunter-class drone ship

== Sports ==
=== Mascots ===
- The mascot of Chief Sealth High School in Seattle, Washington
- The mascot of Delaware Military Academy in Wilmington, Delaware
- The mascot of Peninsula High School near Gig Harbor, Washington
- The mascot of Redondo Union High School in Redondo Beach, California
- The mascot of South Lakes High School near Reston in Fairfax County, Virginia
- The mascot of South River High School in Edgewater, Maryland
- The mascot of Southside High School in Chocowinity, North Carolina
- The mascot of H. Frank Carey Junior-Senior High School in Franklin Square, New York
- The mascot of Anacortes High School in Anacortes, Washington
- The mascot of Myrtle Beach High School in Myrtle Beach, South Carolina

=== Teams ===
==== Professional ====
- Bremerhaven Seahawks, an American football club from Bremerhaven, Germany
- Hull Seahawks, an English ice hockey team competing in the National Ice Hockey League
- Miami Seahawks, an All-America Football Conference team in 1946
- Seattle Seahawks, a National Football League team
- Seattle Sea Hawks (ice hockey), an ice hockey team that played from 1933 to 1941
- Seahawks Gdynia, a Polish American Football League team

==== College ====
- Broward Seahawks, athletic teams from Broward College, Florida
- Cabrillo College Seahawks, athletic teams from Cabrillo College in Aptos California
- Iowa Pre-Flight Seahawks football, a college football team during World War II
- Memorial Sea-Hawks, athletic teams from Memorial University of Newfoundland in St. John's, Newfoundland and Labrador, Canada
- Keiser Seahawks, athletic teams from Keiser University's Florida campus
- St. Mary's Seahawks, athletic teams from St. Mary's College of Maryland
- Salve Regina Seahawks, athletic teams from Salve Regina University in Newport, Rhode Island
- UNC Wilmington Seahawks, athletic teams from the University of North Carolina at Wilmington
- Wagner Seahawks, athletic teams from Wagner College in Staten Island, New York
- LSCPA Seahawks, athletic teams from Lamar State College–Port Arthur in Port Arthur, Texas

== Other uses ==
- RNAS Culdrose (HMS Seahawk), name of the Royal Naval Air Station Culdrose at Helston in Cornwall
- Rheinmetall Seahawk, a model of 20 mm naval autocannon used aboard TTS Brighton

== See also ==
- Hawk (disambiguation)
- Sea (disambiguation)
