= Hawke =

Hawke may refer to:

- Hawke (surname)

== In fiction ==
- Hawke (film), a 2010 Australian television film about Bob Hawke
- Hawke (novel), a 2003 novel by Ted Bell
- Hawke (Advance Wars), a fictional commander first introduced in Advance Wars 2: Black Hole Rising
- Hawke (Dragon Age), a prominent character from the Dragon Age video game series
- Hawke, a fictional character in the video game Romancing SaGa
- Cannon Hawke, comic book character
- Connor Hawke, comic book character
- Jeff Hawke, a science fiction comic strip
- Elizabeth Hawke, protagonist/antagonist in the Australian series Wicked Science

== Places ==
- Hawke Bay, a bay on the North Island of New Zealand
- Hawke's Bay, the area surrounding Hawke Bay, New Zealand
- Hawke's Bay (Karachi), a beach and neighborhood in Karachi, Pakistan
- Hawke's Bay Province, a historical province of New Zealand
- Hawke (New Zealand electorate), a historical parliamentary electorate of New Zealand
- Mount Hawke, village in Cornwall, England, U.K.
- Hawke (crater), a lunar impact crater on the southern hemisphere on the far side of the Moon
- Division of Hawke, Australian electoral division
- Hawkesdale, Victoria, Australia
- Hawksdale, a location in Cumbria, England, sometimes called "Hawkesdale"

== Ships ==
- HMS Hawke, the name of various British Royal Navy ships

== Organisations ==
- Hawke Sea Scouts, a Scouting unit in Auckland, New Zealand.
- Hawke Racing Cars, a defunct Formula Ford racing car constructor
- Hawke Coachwork, a defunct coachbuilder

== Animals ==
- A historical alternative spelling for hawk
