= HMS Hawk =

Eleven ships of the Royal Navy have borne the name HMS Hawk after the bird of prey, the hawk:

- HMS Hawk (1721) was an 8-gun sloop that foundered in 1731.
- HMS Hawk (1741) was a 10-gun sloop launched in 1741 and broken up in 1747.
- HMS Hawk (1756) was a 10-gun sloop launched in 1756. She was captured by the French in 1759, but was retaken in 1761. She was then sold in 1781.
- HMS Hawk (1761) is recorded as being a 10-gun sloop launched in 1761, though she may be the previous HMS Hawk after a rebuild.
- HMS Hawk (1775) was a 6-gun schooner in service from 1775. An American squadron captured her off Rhode Island on 4 April 1776.
- HMS Hawk (1778) was a schooner/tender of HMS Experiment. She had been the American-owned, Dutch-flagged Willing Maid captured by Experiment on 11 January 1778.
- HMS Hawk (1793) was a 16-gun sloop launched in 1793 and broken up in 1803.
- HMS Hawk (1795) was a galley in service in 1795 and sold in 1796.
- HMS Hawk (1803) was an 18-gun sloop, previously the French privateer Atalante. HMS Plantagenet captured her in 1803 and she foundered in 1804.
- HMS Hawk (1806) was a 16-gun brig-sloop, previously the French ship Lutine, which HMS Agamemnon and HMS Carysfort captured in 1806. She was renamed HMS Buzzard in 1812 and was sold in 1814.
- HMS Hawk (1869) was a screw coastguard vessel launched in 1869. She was renamed HMS Amelia in 1888.
- HMS Hawk (1888) was a coastguard vessel. She had been launched in 1884 and had previously been in civilian service as Lady Aline. She was purchased by the Navy in 1888 and briefly named HMS Oberon before being named HMS Hawk. She was renamed HMS Undine in 1904 and was sold in 1906.

== See also ==
- Royal Navy ships named HMS Hawke
- HMAS Hawk, two ships of the Royal Australian Navy
- USS Hawk, several ships of the U.S. Navy
