= Saint Joseph's Hawks =

Athletics teams of Saint Joseph's University

- University: Saint Joseph's University
- Nickname: The Hawks
- NCAA: Division I
- Conference: A-10
- Athletic director: Eric Laudano (interim)
- Location: Philadelphia, Pennsylvania
- Varsity teams: 20
- Basketball arena: Hagan Arena
- Baseball stadium: John W. Smithson Field
- Soccer stadium: Sweeney Field
- Colors: Crimson and gray
- Mascot: The Hawk
- Fight song: Oh When the Hawks Go Flying In!!
- Website: sjuhawks.com
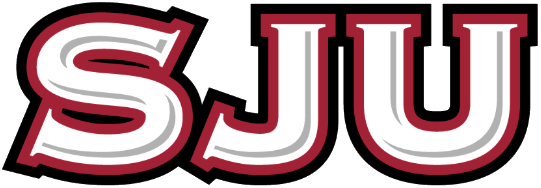

The Saint Joseph's Hawks are the athletic teams that represent Saint Joseph's University of Philadelphia, Pennsylvania. The Hawks compete in Division I of the National Collegiate Athletic Association as a member of the Atlantic 10 Conference and of the Philadelphia Big 5. The school also has intramurals and extramurals, the latter of which compete within the City 6 (the six major universities in Philadelphia). The school is mostly known for its men's basketball team. The Hawk became the school's mascot in 1929. It first flapped its wings at a basketball game in 1956 in a win over La Salle University. The Saint Joseph's school colors are crimson and gray.

== Sports sponsored ==
| Men's sports | Women's sports |
|---|---|
| Baseball | Basketball |
| Basketball | Cross country |
| Cross country | Field hockey |
| Golf | Lacrosse |
| Lacrosse | Rowing |
| Rowing | Soccer |
| Soccer | Softball |
| Tennis | Tennis |
| Track and field^{1} | Track and field^{1} |
^{1} – includes both indoor and outdoor

A member of the Atlantic 10 Conference and the Philadelphia Big 5, Saint Joseph's University sponsors teams in nine men's and ten women's NCAA sanctioned sports. The men's lacrosse team competes as an associate member of the Northeast Conference. Men's rowing is sanctioned by the Intercollegiate Rowing Association, not by the NCAA. Saint Joseph's men's team competes as an independent.

=== Baseball ===
The baseball team played its games at Latshaw Field under lights making it the only team in the Philadelphia area able to play home games at night. They compete in the A-10 in the East Division. In 2007, the team was led by strong hitting but no pitchers had ERA's under 5.91. Since 2002, the team has gone 84–227 overall and 47–103 in conference play.

The baseball team played the 2009, 2010, and 2011 seasons at Campbell's Field in Camden, New Jersey and moved to the Maguire Campus on Hawk Hill in 2012. All Hawks home games are now held at John W. Smithson Field in Lower Merion, Pennsylvania. Its prime location and turf surface make Smithson Field one of the top baseball facilities in the country.

Saint Joseph's played the first game on the Washington Nationals new field, Nationals Park in a loss to George Washington University in 2008. St. Joe's also played in the first game at the University of Pennsylvania's Murphy Field on March 23, 2000.

20 SJU baseball players have been drafted in the history of the school's program. Jamie Moyer, class of 1985, holds the records for strikeouts and ERA in a season. His is the only number to be retired for baseball.

There are currently 6 former Hawks playing professional baseball, in affiliated and independent leagues.

=== Men's basketball ===
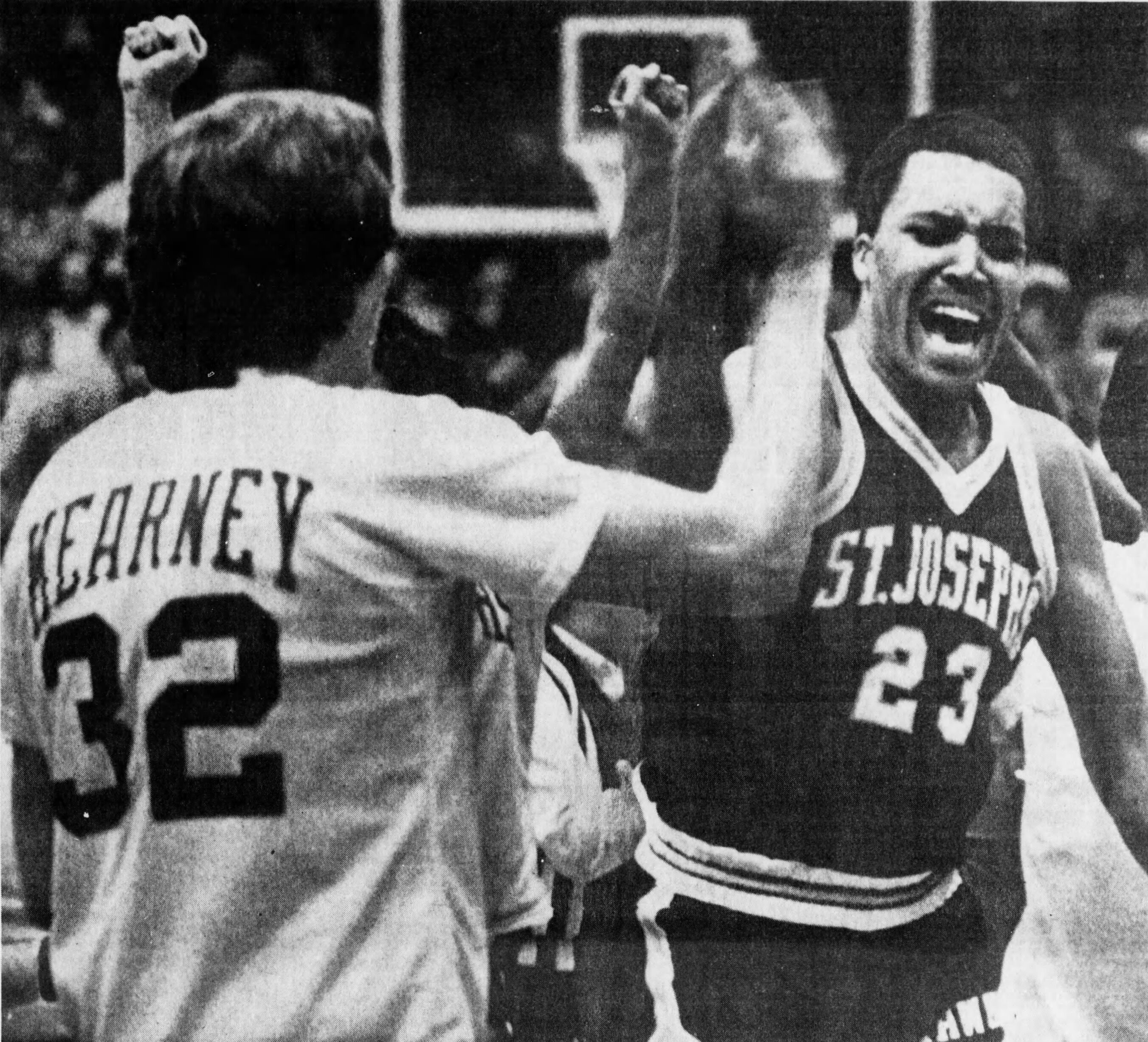
Bob Kearney and Tony Costner celebrate their upset win over 1-seed DePaul at the 1981 NCAA tournament

Men's basketball is the most popular sport at Saint Joseph's University. The Hawks have competed in twenty one NCAA Tournaments (1959, 1960, 1961, 1962, 1963, 1965, 1966, 1969, 1971, 1973, 1974, 1981, 1982, 1986, 1997, 2001, 2003, 2004, 2008, 2014, 2016) and sixteen NIT Tournaments (1956, 1958,1964, 1972, 1979, 1980, 1984, 1985, 1993, 1995, 1996, 2002, 2005, 2006, 2012, 2013). They have made one Final Four, three Elite Eights, and seven Sweet Sixteens. Throughout the school's history, 29 different players have been drafted into the NBA.

The Saint Joseph's University's basketball team was ranked 43rd best of all-time by Smith & Street's magazine in 2005. The Hawks have won seven Atlantic 10 regular season titles and three A-10 tournament championships and ranks 33rd all-time in wins with 1,439 and 44th all-time with a .605 winning percentage.

Fans of the Hawks often chant "The Hawk Will Never Die!" Since the school's undefeated season, this chant has gained familiarity with the team's opponents. In 2003, Sports Illustrated listed that cheer among The 100 Things You Gotta Do Before You Graduate (Whatever the Cost), calling it "the most defiant cheer in college sports."

==== 2003–04 Season ====
During the 2003–2004 season, the Saint Joseph's Hawks went perfect 27–0 during the regular season. The Hawks were led by a backcourt of Jameer Nelson and Delonte West, both of whom would end up as starters in the NBA. The Hawks ended the regular season with a No. 1 ranking nationally and a No. 1 ranking in the NCAA Tournament. After losing to Xavier University in the Atlantic 10 tournament quarterfinal, St. Joe's made it to the Elite Eight in the NCAA tournament. They would finally lose to Oklahoma State in the last seven seconds of the game to end their remarkable run. Nelson was named National Player of the Year while coach Phil Martelli was named Coach of the Year.

==== Current ====
The Hawks most recently made it to the NCAA Tournament in 2016. They defeated Cincinnati 78–76 in the first round, but lost to #1 seed Oregon 69–64 in the second.

==== Rivals ====
Historical rivals of SJU are the La Salle Explorers, being the only two Catholic universities actually in Philadelphia proper. For decades, though, the main rival has been the Villanova University Wildcats. The annual basketball game between SJU and Villanova is locally referred to as the Holy War. Villanova leads the all-time series 47 to 25. St. Joseph's also has a heated rivalry with the Temple University Owls. Because games against Drexel University are in-city, the two teams are sometimes considered rivals but Saint Joseph's leads the all-time series 43 to 6. The all-time series between La Salle and the Hawks is 63 to 49 in SJU's favor. They are losing the all-time series against Temple 63 to 75 and winning the series with Penn 45 to 32. Overall, the Hawks are 112–83 in the Big 5 which once was the best team among Big 5 schools.

Other less intense rivalries include those with A-10 competitors Virginia Commonwealth University, who Saint Joe's beat twice in three years for the A-10 Championship, Xavier University and the University of Massachusetts Amherst.

=== Field hockey ===
The Saint Joseph's field hockey program has become the preeminent team in the Atlantic 10. The Hawks have won 8 of the last 9 regular season titles (2016-19, 2021-24) and 7 of the last 8 tournament titles (2017-19, 2021-24), thus reaching the NCAA tournament in each occasion.

St. Joe's won its first NCAA tournament game in 2022, defeating Wake Forest to reach the quarterfinals.

In 2024, the field hockey team became the first program in Saint Joseph's history to compete for a national title. The Hawks, the No. 4 seed, hosted a regional for the first time, defeating Lafayette and Princeton by matching 1-0 scores.

In the 2024 national semifinals, Saint Joseph's defeated two-time defending national champion and No. 1 North Carolina, 2-1, in Ann Arbor, Michigan, snapping UNC's 27-game winning streak in the process. SJU fell to Northwestern in the 2024 title game.

In 2007, SJU advanced to the A-10 Championship game but lost to UMass. They won the conference tournament and regular season championship in 1995.

=== Lacrosse ===
Saint Joseph's previously competed as members of the MAAC, CAA, and NEC conferences.

In 2000, St. Joe's was the number one seed in the MAAC year-end tournament, they would go on to win the MAAC Championship, defeating Manhattan 17-7.

From Taylor Wrays first season in 2012, through the 2024 season, St. Joe's record has been 120 wins and 69 losses. Including 8 first-place conference finishes, 5 NEC tournament finals, 1 NEC Championship, and 1 A10 Championship.

=== Soccer ===
SJU's soccer team used to be a part of the unofficial Soccer 7 until Philadelphia University dropped down to Division II. Now the "league" is referred to as the Soccer 6. Former Hawk goalkeeper and current head coach Tim Mulqueen coached soccer in the 2008 Beijing Olympics.

=== Softball ===
As May 1, 2008, the softball team had a player, Brooke Darreff, who was leading the nation in batting average (.500). Darreff was also named the Atlantic 10 softball player of the year. Erika Rosenwinkel ended up leading the NCAA in doubles and Darreff finished fifth in batting average and sixteenth in doubles per game.

=== Rowing ===
Saint Joseph's competes in the Dad Vail Regatta, a nationally recognized event and the largest collegiate regatta in the United States, held on the Schuylkill River in Philadelphia. The Hawks women and men have taken championships home as recently as 2006 and 1999 respectively.

SJU's boathouse sits on the east bank of the Schuylkill River approximately 2 miles up river from the historic Boathouse Row, listed among the "100 Things To Do Before You Graduate" by Sports Illustrated (visit Boathouse Row).

Former SJU rower Renee Hykel competed in the 2008 Olympic Games in the lightweight double sculls. She also won a silver medal in the lightweight double sculls at the 2005 World Championships in Gifu, Japan and a bronze medal in the lightweight quadruple sculls in the 2004 World Championships. Hykel was a five-time member of the U.S. National Rowing Team.

In 2008, SJU rower Debbie Bateman won A-10 student-athlete of the year.

== Notable non-varsity sports ==
=== Dance ===
As of early 2008, the dance team was nationally ranked. They dance at all SJU home basketball games and occasionally perform at 76ers home games.

=== Rugby ===
The Saint Joseph's University Rugby Football Club (RFC) was founded in 1962 by sophomore Hugh O'Neill, a transferee from Saint Lois University. Mr. O'Neill recruited Dr. Francis Caughlin from Villanova University as the team's first head coach. Because of the dearth of college rugby teams in the '60s, the Hawks played mostly Ivy League schools such as Princeton, Penn, Yale and Harvard. Saint Joseph's University Rugby team now plays college rugby in the Mid-Atlantic Rugby Conference. St. Joseph's, as a university without a football team, their rugby team has received great exposure on campus over the last number of years. The Hawks play their home matches at Sweeney Field. The Hawks are led by head coach Mike Williams (6/2022-Present).

The Hawks won Eastern Pennsylvania Rugby Union (EPRU) league titles in 2008 and 2010. In 2011, the Hawks were promoted from Division II to Division I-AA. Since 2016 the Hawks have won the MARC 6 out the last 7 seasons, and have made it to the NCR national semi-finals 5 time. Reaching the D1-AA National Championship twice during that time.

== Former sports ==
=== Football ===
Saint Joseph's College had a football team until 1939. It is unclear when the program officially started. One of the earlier recorded games was in 1901 against Fordham College. The outcome was a 0–0 tie. Saint Joseph's hired Edward Bennis in 1909 to coach the team. Bennis was a former football standout at the University of Pennsylvania.

SJU played many of its home games at Wynnewood Park in addition to 28th Street and Allegheny Avenue in Philadelphia. Finnesey Field, located on 54th and City Avenue, was dedicated on October 12, 1929. The opening game was played that day as Saint Joseph's lost to Pennsylvania Military College by a score of 7–6. Pennsylvania Military College would later become Widener University.

In 1925–26, Saint Joseph's started to draw up plans for a 70,000 – 80,000 seat neo-classical (colosseum) style stadium. The plans were put on permanent hold however due to both a lack of funds as well as a growing feeling among the student body that Saint Joseph's would never be able to compete with other schools in terms of football.

Though the plans for a stadium ultimately failed, the college would later name its outdoor athletic facility after James T. Finnesey who donated more than half of the original $42,000 that was initially raised to build the new stadium. Finnesey was the president of Finnesey & Kobler which was an auto manufacturer at the time.

Ironically enough, the current mascot for Saint Joseph's got its name from the football team. In 1928, a yearbook editor named Charlie Dunn started a contest in order to find a nickname for the colleges athletic teams. Suggestions from the student body were narrowed down to two nicknames; "The Hawks" and "The Grenadiers." Ultimately, the Hawk mascot won in a narrow margin over the Grenadiers. John Gallagher ('31) was the name of the student who submitted the Hawk suggestion. The name was appropriate, or so the student body felt, because they were used to seeing real hawks frequently flying over and around the campus. It was felt by Dunn that the mascot "typified the fighting spirit of our Crimson and Gray athletes..." and was "...suggestive of the aerial attack which has made our football team famous."

Saint Joseph's college officially discontinued its football program after the 1939 season. This was done for many reasons, not the least of which was the financial burden the program placed on the college as well as "pitifully small" attendance at the games. There was growing sentiment among the student body that athletics should not be placed in front of academics and generally speaking, the football team could not compete talent wise with larger collegiate football powerhouses in the area.

From 1916 to 1939, the Saint Joseph's College football team played roughly 4–8 games per season. They did not field a team during the '17,'19,'20 and '21 seasons. Common opponents included P.M.C (Pennsylvania Military College) now known as Widener University, Lebanon Valley College, University of Delaware, La Salle University, Drexel University, Albright, Manhattan, West Chester University, Washington College and Villanova University. Other opponents of note include Boston College, Seton Hall, Susquehanna University, St. Johns, Temple University and Georgetown University.

During this period, the team's worst record was 0–7–1 in 1930 while the college posted a 6–2 record in 1928 as well as a 6–3 record in 1938. In its final season, the football team beat the City College of New York (20–13), Lebanon Valley College (13–2), St. Francis (13–7) and Arkansas A&M (40–17) en route to a 4–4–1 record. SJU holds an overall record of 61–75–13 during the period from 1916 to 1939.

== Olympians ==
Mike Teti competed multiple times. Seán Drea competed for Ireland. The Hawks had two women compete as lightweight scullers on the United States Olympic Team – Teresa Zarzecki Bell (Silver Medal, 1996 Games) and Renee Hykel (10th Place, 2008 Games)

Mike Bantom was on the US Olympic Team in 1972 in Munich. The games will be always remembered for the terrorist attacks, as well as the still controversial ending of the basketball championship game. To this day no member of the 1972 team has accepted their silver medals, and many have stipulations in their wills that none of their heirs can ever make a valid claim to receive them after the competitors have died.

Tim Mulqueen was an assistant coach/goalkeeper coach on the 2008 Men's Olympic Soccer Team in Beijing.

== Mascot ==
SJU's mascot, The Hawk, has garnered numerous accolades in its 71-year history. It won a "Best of Philly" award from Philadelphia Magazine in 2003–04, has been named the Atlantic 10 Conference's best mascot, and has been selected as the nation's top mascot by The Sporting News, Sports Illustrated, Sports Illustrated for Kids, Street & Smith's Basketball Yearbook, and ESPN College Basketball magazine.

== Athletic facilities ==
- East Norriton Field: Located in East Norriton, Pa., East Norriton Field has served as Saint Joseph's University home softball field for the past 11 seasons. Prior to its move to East Norriton Field, SJU used nearby Belmont Plateau as its primary home field.
- Elmwood Park: The home of Saint Joseph's University baseball is Elmwood Park's Latshaw/McCarthy Field in Norristown, Pa. Originally laid out in 1938, the field was being rebuilt when the Hawks moved in for the 1990 season. The park's dimensions measure 328 feet to the foul poles and 393 feet to center field.
- Robert Gillin Jr. Boathouse: Saint Joseph's University celebrated its sesquicentennial anniversary in 2000–01. In conjunction with that celebration, the SJU Rowing Program, along with Saint Joseph's Prep, kicked off a capital campaign to finance the construction of a state-of-the-art boathouse on the Schuylkill River. The boathouse provides a permanent home for the Hawk rowing programs. In addition, it provides the University with a significant presence on Kelly Drive. Named in honor of Robert Gillin Jr., groundbreaking for the facility took place in the fall of 2001 with construction expected to be completed in time for the 2002–03 academic year. The total cost for the project was approximately $3 million, plus an endowment fund to support ongoing operational costs.
- Sweeney Field: Laid out in a natural bowl in the center of Saint Joseph's campus, Finnesey Field has been the home of Hawk athletic teams since 1929. Originally constructed for football and opened in 1929 with plans for an eventual 70,000-seat stadium, the field has undergone numerous changes over the years. Before the 2013–2014 school year, the field was renamed Sweeney Field.
- Finnesey Courts: Adjacent to Finnesey Field stand the Finnesey Courts, home to the Hawk men's and women's tennis teams since the late 1940s. Prior to that SJU primarily played its home matches at the nearby Narberth courts. When courts were first built on campus, they were located where Bellarmine Hall now stands. Due to Bellarmine's construction in the summer of 1960, however, the Finnesey courts were torn down and rebuilt in their current location. The Hawks tennis teams moved to the new SJU Tennis Complex at the Maguire Campus in 2009.
- Alumni Memorial Fieldhouse: The on-campus home of the Hawks, was named for the Saint Joseph's graduates who gave their lives in World War II. The building was officially dedicated on November 11, 1949 and two weeks later, played host to its first basketball game, a 62–46 loss to Rhode Island on November 26. Following that initial setback, SJU would go on to win the next 23 games in the friendly confines of the Fieldhouse. Overall, the Hawks have compiled an impressive 305–76 record (80.0 winning percentage) on Hawk Hill. Among the highlights of the Hawks' homecourt advantage was a 34-game winning streak from the late 1950s to the early 1960s, an 11–0 record in 2000–01 and the unbeaten 11–0 mark as the Hawks made their perfect season run in 2003–04. All told, SJU has had only two losing records in the Fieldhouse over 57 seasons. The Fieldhouse was renovated, reopening in 2009, to add another 1,000 seats to the existing 3,200 and renamed Michael J. Hagan Arena. While the renovation was happening, the Hawks played their home games at the Palestra on the University of Pennsylvania's campus.
- Maguire Campus: Eventually, fields and courts on the new Maguire Campus was officially opened on the 1st May 2025 and is home to the baseball, softball, tennis, and field hockey teams.

== Sports alumni ==
=== Baseball ===
- Jamie Moyer
- Gerald Hunsicker (GM)
- Jimmy Yacabonis

=== Men's basketball ===
- Jameer Nelson
- Delonte West
- Mike Bantom
- Matt Guokas
- Dwayne Jones
- Jim Lynam
- Jack McKinney
- Jim O'Brien
- Jack Ramsay
- Pat Carroll
- Bruiser Flint
- Pat Calathes
- Ahmad Nivins
- Tom Duff
- Cliff Anderson
- Maurice Martin
- Langston Galloway
- Ronald Roberts
- DeAndre Bembry

=== Women's basketball ===
- Debbie Black
- Megan Compain
- Muffet McGraw
- Natasha Cloud

=== Track and field ===
- Vince Papale

=== Boxing ===
- Chazz Witherspoon

=== Soccer ===
- Tim Mulqueen

== See also ==
- Philadelphia Sports Hall of Fame
- Sports in Philadelphia § Collegiate sports
