= David Hawk =

David Hawk may refer to:

- David B. Hawk (born 1968), American politician in Tennessee
- David L. Hawk (born 1948), American management theorist, architect and systems scientist

== See also ==
- David Hawkes (disambiguation)
