= Hawke (novel) =

2003 novel by Ted Bell

- First edition
- Language: English
- Publisher: Atria Books
- Publication date: 2003

Hawke is a 2003 novel written by New York Times best-selling author Ted Bell. It is published by Atria Books.

== Plot summary ==
A coup d'état involving rogue military leaders in Cuba leads to Alexander Hawke to investigate and stop the threat of a nuclear submarine.
