= Starhawk (disambiguation) =

Starhawk is an American writer and activist.

Starhawk may also refer to:

- Starhawk (2012 video game), a video game for the PlayStation 3
- Starhawk (1979 video game), a vector arcade game by Cinematronics
- Star Hawks, a comic strip
- Starhawk (character), an antihero in the Earth-691 timeline of the Marvel Comics universe
- Aleta Ogord or Starhawk, a superheroine in a future of the Marvel Comics universe
