= Onera Amelia Merritt-Hawkes =

American-English travel writer, zoologist and eugenicist

- Born: Mary Weston; 15 February 1877; New York City, New York, USA
- Died: 19 July 1951 (aged 74); Cheltenham, Gloucestershire, England
- Other name: Millie Merritt
- Education: University College London; University of Birmingham
- Occupations: Zoologist, eugenicist, traveller and writer
- Employer: Wellesley College
- Organization: Eugenics Society

Onéra Amelia Merritt-Hawkes (15 February 1877 – 19 July 1951) was an American-English zoologist, eugenicist, traveller and writer. Born in New York City, she moved to England where she lived for most of her life. In 1935 she published an account of her travels in Persia (current day Iran) and the next year she wrote on her travels through Mexico. From 1940 she went by the name of Mary Weston in the books that she wrote.

== Life and work ==
Onéra Amelia Merritt was born Mary Weston in New York City to Charlotta and McDuff Stewart. The family moved to Jamaica in 1888 due to economic difficulties and at the age of thirteen she went to a boarding school in England. She received a BSc in zoology from University College London in 1903 (with the name recorded as Millie Merritt) and an MSc from the University of Birmingham. She worked briefly as a zoology instructor 1903–04 at Wellesley College. She married Birmingham dentist Richard John James Hawkes.

She travelled to Persia in 1933 from Bushehr to Basra through Shiraz, Yazd, Tehran and Isfahan which resulted in a book published in 1935, Persia: Romance and Reality. As a woman she was able to interact with women in Iranian society unlike most western male travel writers of the period. She went through a divorce before World War II and changed her name but she retained her married surname in some works. She wrote High Up in Mexico (1936) and in 1944 she wrote My Friend America under the name of Mary Weston.

Merritt-Hawkes worked on the anatomy of elasmobranchs after her MSc. She conducted experiments on silkworms Philosamia from 1917 to 1920. She also conducted studies on other insects. She was a member of the Eugenics Society, examined human genetic traits, collected pedigree charts, and wrote on the genealogies of notable people. She also had an interest in music, governance and global demographic growth.

At the World Congress for Sexual Reform and Sex Education at Copenhagen in July 1928 she called for better education on anatomy and physiology at school. In a 1937 letter, she wrote that the public lectures of J. B. S. Haldane had damaged the work of the Eugenics Society and their support for the Brock Report.

The fact that her separately published writings from 1940 onwards were published under the name Mary Weston has led to the erroneous claim that the nom-de-plume indicated an official or semi-official change of name due to her association with eugenics and the rise of the Nazi regime. She wrote an autobiography, One American Child (1935). She died at a Cheltenham nursing home and her death was recorded under the name of Merritt-Hawkes.
