= Hauk =

Hauk may refer to:

- A. Andrew Hauk (1912–2004), US federal judge
- Angelo Hauk (born 1984), Italian–German footballer
- Bob Hauk, fictional character in the 1981 American film Escape from New York
- Minnie Hauk (1851–1929), American operatic singer
- Peter Hauk (born 1960), German politician
- Thomas Hauk, fictional character on the HBO drama The Wire
- Hauk Aabel (1869–1961), Norwegian comedian and actor
- Hauk Buen (born 1933), Norwegian hardingfele fiddler and fiddle maker

== See also ==
- Hauk-class patrol boat, a series of Norwegian fast attack craft
- Kjeller Hauk, a Norwegian biplane model from 1923 to 1929
