= Habich =

Habich is a surname. Notable people with the surname include:

- Edward Jan Habich, Polish engineer and mathematician
- Georg Habich (1868–1932), German numismatist and art historian
- Hermann Habich (1895–?), German World War I flying ace
- Matthias Habich, German actor

== See also ==
- Habicht, a mountain in Austria
