= Hawk (brand) =

Filipino backpack manufacturer

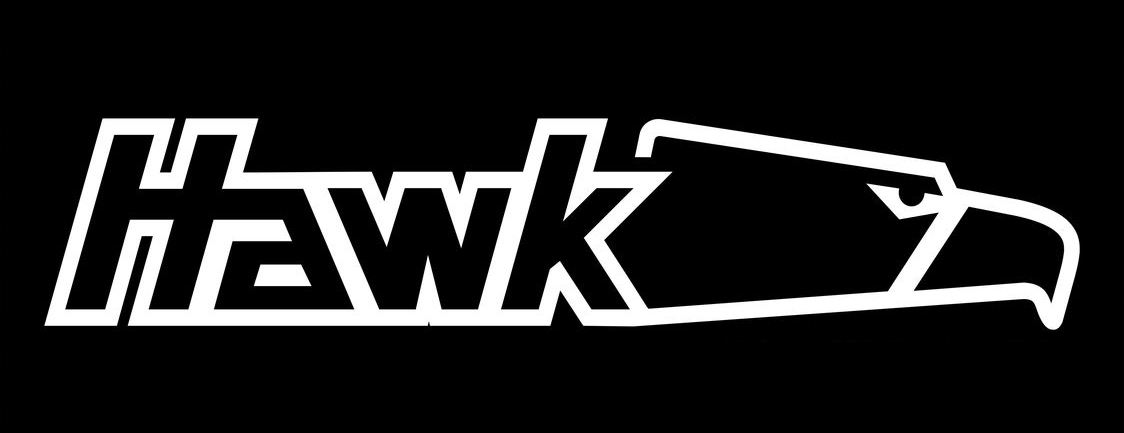
- Product type: Backpacks
- Current owner: Hawk International Group Limited (1978–present)
- Introduced: 1978; 48 years ago Manila, Philippines
- Website: Hawk official website

Hawk is a Filipino brand of backpacks and collegiate apparel owned by Hawk International Group Limited of Hong Kong as one of its subsidiaries. Hawk is considered as one of the Philippines' largest backpack brands.

== History ==
Benjamin Chan, a Filipino-Chinese businessman started a new subsidiary of backpacks in 1978 in the Philippines under the Hawk International Group Limited of Hong Kong at Malate, Manila.

In 1996, Hawk established its first in-house bag manufacturing facility in Quanzhou, Fujian, China. Currently, this factory produces Original design manufacturer (ODM) products for an unnamed American brand.

In 2005, the company established its second in-house manufacturing facility in Shenzhen, Guangdong, China.

In 2009, the company established its third in-house manufacturing facility in Ganzhou, Jiangxi, China. All facilities house 1000 workers at a combined 30,000 square meters of floor area.

Together with the three manufacturing facilities in China, Hawk operates its repair facilities in Santa Mesa Heights, Quezon City.

Hawk's corporate headquarters is now located in Santa Mesa Heights, Quezon City, where it shares its repair facilities and main warehouse. Its original headquarters in Malate, Manila was subsequently closed down when this new location was opened.

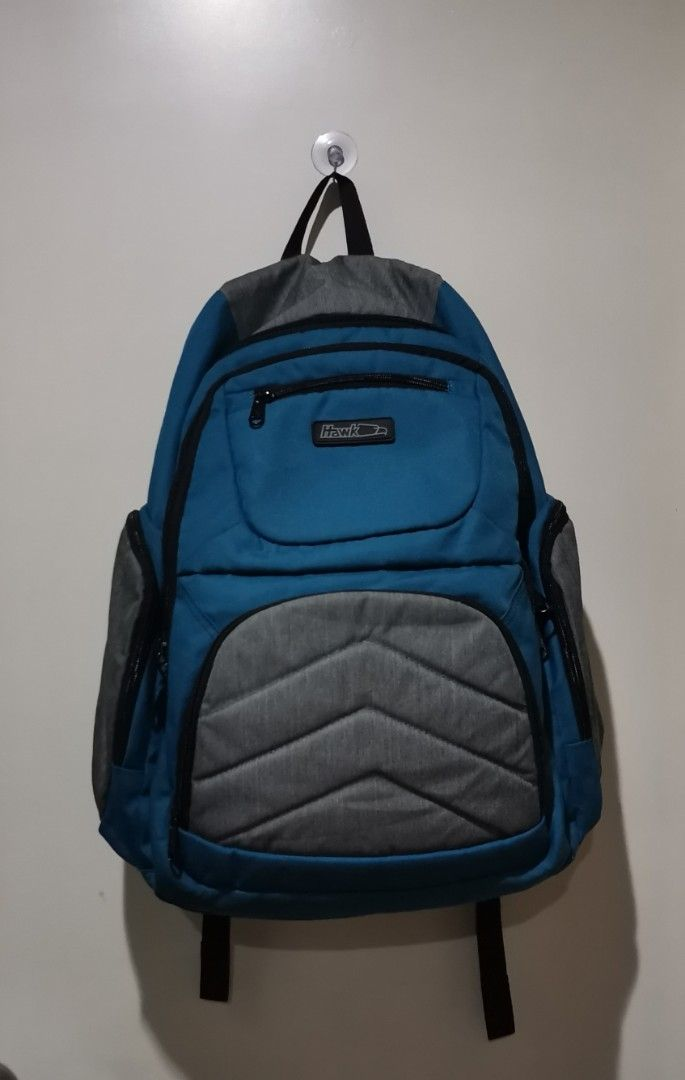
A Hawk 5266 backpack

Hawk started by manufacturing both in-house and ODM backpacks to which it has expanded into more designs and other bag styles throughout the years.

== Proprietary technologies ==
The company claims to implement two in-house technologies in their products, namely the ''Durashield fabric", their proprietary lock-stitch technology that resists tears, and the more recent "Virupro with nano-silver technology" which claims to self-sanitize itself while in use. The latter is being implemented as a feature following the demand for sanitized products due to the COVID-19 pandemic.

== International presence ==
Hawk has since expanded to other countries including the United Arab Emirates, Saudi Arabia, Kuwait, and Bahrain by opening up stores in the aforementioned countries.
