= Hawk McGinnis =

American walker and minister (born 1927)

Harry Lee "Hawk" McGinnis (born August 28, 1927 (Note: Earlier sources written during his walks tend to put his birth year as 1926, while later sources discussing his life have it as 1927.)) is an American traveler who walked at least 80,000 miles (130,000 km) on an around-the-world walking tour, from 1992 to c. 2012. Earlier in his life, he walked through all 50 United States from 1983 to 1987.

== Life and career ==
Born in 1927, Hawk grew up in Indiana on a farm.

In 1944, he joined the U.S. Army and was posted in Japan and the Philippines during the Second World War. During the war he received the nickname Hawk, which later stuck as his name. He returned to the U.S. in 1947 and became a singer. Later, he changed his career and joined a local magazine as a magazine editor and then finally a Methodist minister.

Hawk started on his first walking expedition on August 29, 1983, on his 57th birthday, setting off on a planned 3-year walk to go in and through all the 50 states of the United States. He was sponsored by both The North Face, who provided him with camping equipment, and Nike, who supplied him with shoes, during his walk. On June 20, 1984, Hawk entered Crater Lake National Park after walking through ten states and still hoped to finish by his 60th birthday. He finished in April 1987.

In 1992, he started in Dublin's Saint Patrick's Day parade of 1992, and by March 2008 has completed sixty-six countries.

Dorian Haarhoff wrote that in 1996, Haarhoff encountered Hawk while walking around the world and he was given a card that read "Dimensions of a Seeker: Desire, Discipline, Determination, Discrimination", which read to Haarhoff like a "poet's manifesto".

He reported on his website that he finished in January 2012 when he crossed the border from Mexico into Texas.

== See also ==
- List of pedestrian circumnavigators
