= David Hawkes =

David Hawkes may refer to:

- David Hawkes (VC) (1822–1858), English recipient of the Victoria Cross
- David Hawkes (sinologist) (1923–2009), British sinologist
- David Hawkes (professor of English) (born 1964), professor of English at Arizona State University

== See also ==
- David Hawk (disambiguation)
