= HMS Hawke =

Seven ships of the Royal Navy have borne the name HMS Hawke, after an archaic spelling of the bird, the hawk. Two of the later ships were named after Edward Hawke, 1st Baron Hawke, whilst another was planned:

- HMS Hawke (1593) was a discovery vessel launched in 1593. Her fate is unknown.
- HMS Hawke (1655) was an 8-gun ketch launched in 1655 and sold in 1667.
- HMS Hawke (1690) was an 8-gun fire ship launched in 1690 and sunk as a foundation in 1712.
- HMS Hawke (1721) was an 8-gun sloop launched in 1721 and was presumed to have foundered in 1739 in the Atlantic after she left Charleston, South Carolina for England.
- HMS Hawke (1794) was a 4-gun former Dutch hoy purchased in 1794 that sank at her moorings in Plymouth dockyard in 1796.
- HMS Hawke (1820) was laid down as a 74-gun third-rate ship of the line, but was altered to carry 60 guns before being launched in 1820. She was refitted with screw propulsion in 1855 and was broken up in 1865.
- HMS Hawke (1891) was an Edgar-class protected cruiser launched in 1891. She was involved in a collision with the liner RMS Olympic in 1911. A U-boat sank Hawke in 1914.
- HMS Hawke was to have been a Minotaur-class cruiser. Started in 1943, her hull, machinery, boilers and three triple Mk 24 DP 6-inch gun mounts were largely complete when she was cancelled in 1945 and broken up on the slipway.
- HMS Hawke was a shore establishment at Exbury House, Hampshire, between 1946 and 1955.

== See also ==
- Royal Navy ships named HMS Hawk
