= The Hawk (Saint Joseph's University mascot) =

Mascot of Saint Joseph's University

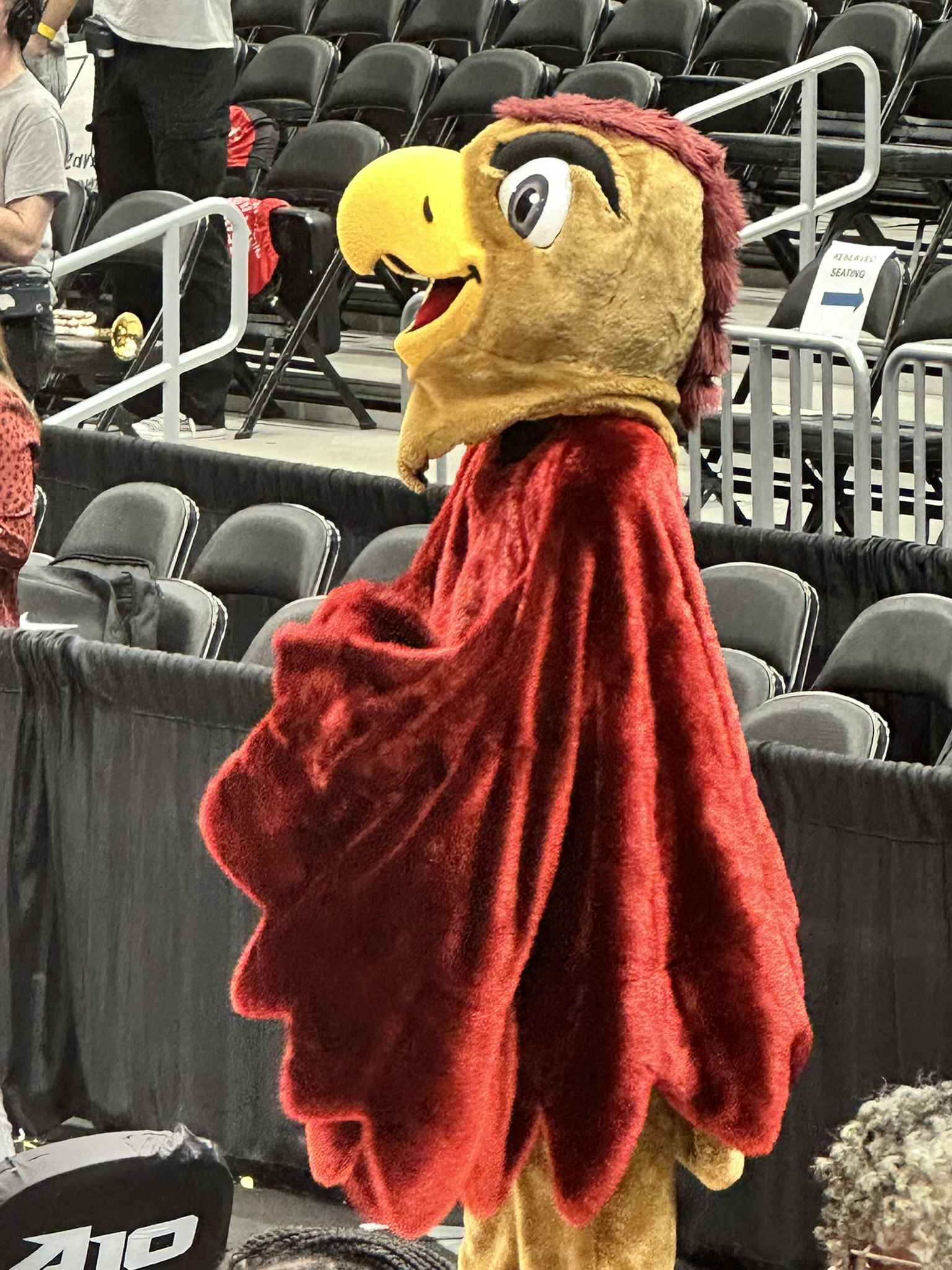
- The Hawk during the 2025 Atlantic 10 men's basketball tournament
- University: Saint Joseph's University
- Conference: A-10
- First seen: January 4, 1956

The Hawk is the mascot of Saint Joseph's University. The Hawk is known for continually flapping its wings, even during halftime, throughout every basketball game. It is estimated the Hawk flaps about 3,500 times per game. This act is often associated with the University's motto, "The Hawk Will Never Die", which supposedly was first shouted by fans during a game with Villanova.

The Hawk, who debuted in 1955, is one of the most decorated mascots in college sports. It has been named the best college mascot by ESPN College Basketball Magazine, Sports Illustrated, and The Sporting News.

== History ==
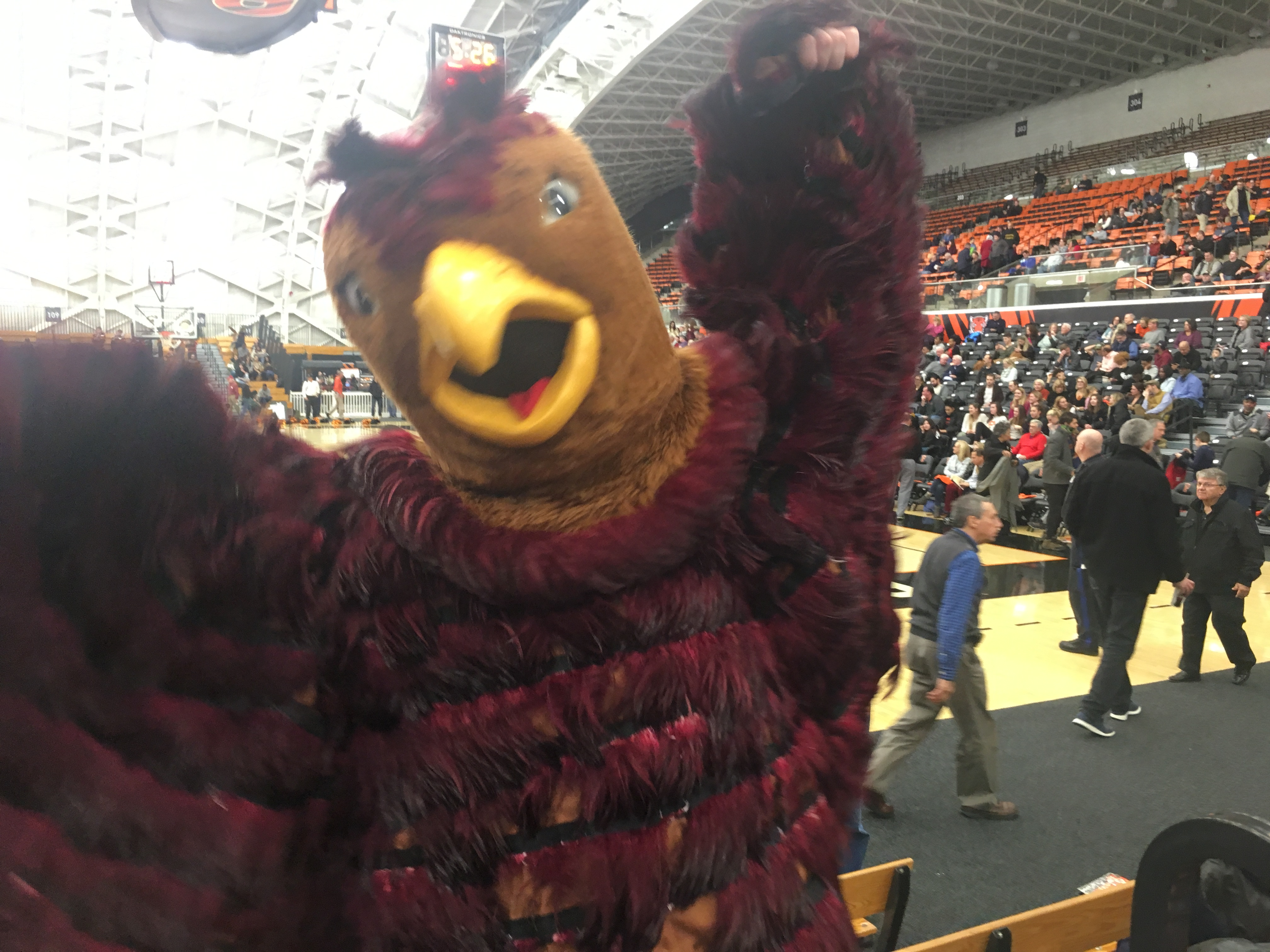
The Hawk flapping while visiting the stands during a halftime in 2018. This version of the Hawk costume was changed in 2023, losing the feathers.

The idea for a Saint Joseph's mascot costumer came from Jim Brennan, a sophomore at the university in 1955, who was inspired by the Princeton tiger. He originally attempted to acquire a live hawk, before pivoting to a hawk costume. Brennan raised $80 from the student body and received an additional $40 from the university to purchase a hawk costume from a local shop. The mascot debuted on December 3, 1955, in a win against Rhode Island. Brennan later said, "When I was in costume, I didn't want to be just a fan watching the game. So I started flapping." He remained the Hawk for the duration of his time at Saint Joseph's, and other students continued the tradition once he graduated. As of 2024, over 60 students have worn the Hawk costume.

In a game in 1998 against the University of Rhode Island mascot, Rhody the Ram, prevented the St. Joe's Hawk from his eternal flapping by putting an inner tube over its head. This temporarily immobilized his arms. While trying to remove the tube, the Hawk's costume head fell off. The incident was televised on ESPN.

== Hawk selection ==
The Hawk travels to away games; here it flaps its wings during the 2025 Atlantic 10 men's basketball tournament in Washington D.C.

Hawk selection is an annual process in which a current student is selected to represent the school. The application process includes an interview and one-hour tryout in the suit. Since 1992, the student awarded the role of mascot has been recipient of an endowed scholarship and is considered a full member of the basketball team.

== Awards ==
- Sports Illustrated Mascot of the 20th Century
- Sporting News Mascot of the Year 2001
- "Best of Philly" award from Philadelphia Magazine in 2003-04

== See also ==
- List of U.S. college mascots
