= Hawk (plasterer's tool) =

Tool used to hold plaster or mortar

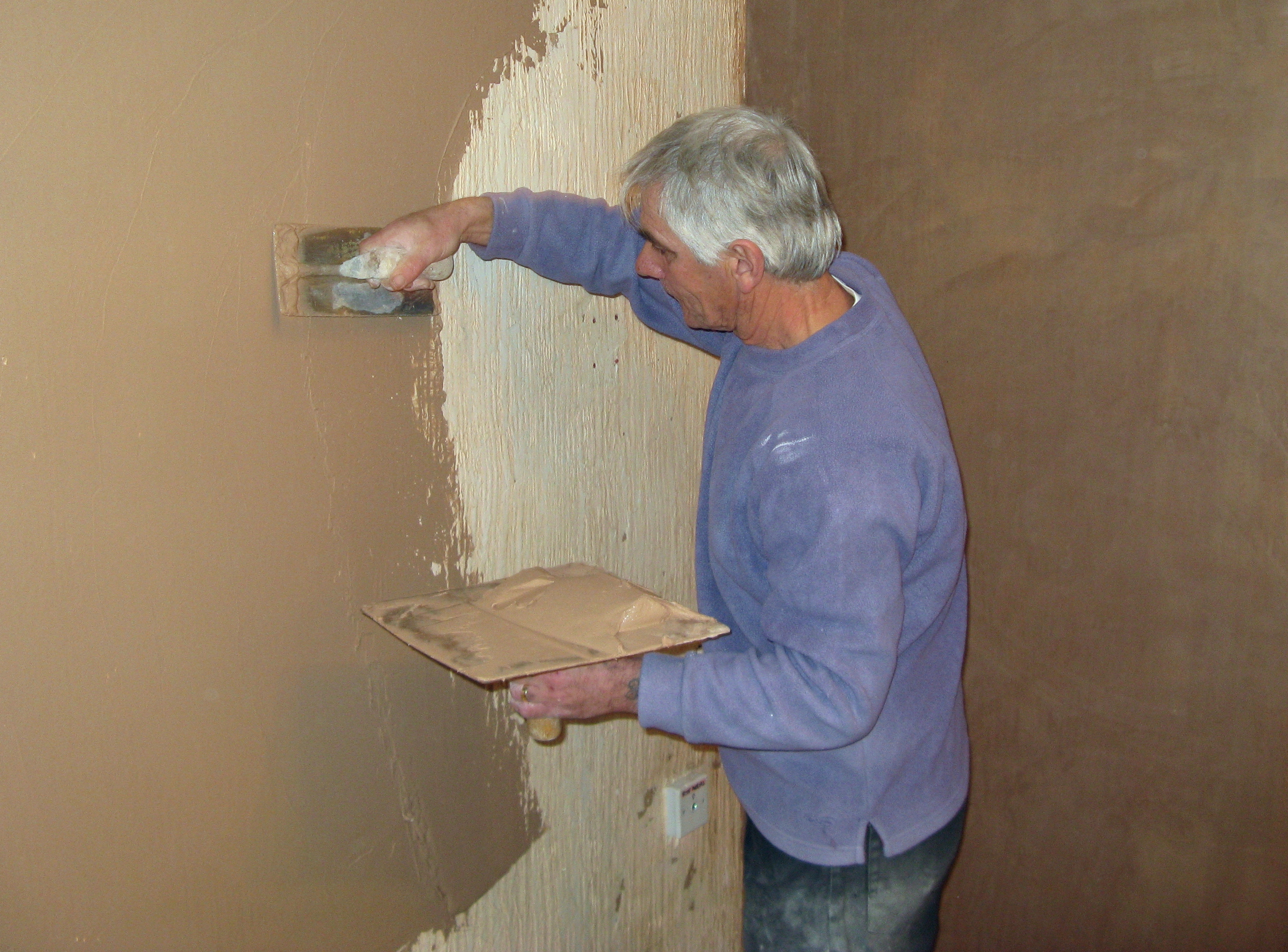
A plasterer covering a wall, using a hawk (in his left hand, carrying some plaster) and finishing trowel (in his right hand, applying plaster to the wall)

A hawk is a tool used to hold a plaster, mortar, or a similar material, so that the user can repeatedly, quickly and easily get some of that material on the tool which then applies it to a surface. A hawk consists of a board about 13 inches square with a perpendicular handle fixed centrally on the reverse. The user holds the hawk horizontally with the non-dominant hand and applies the material on the hawk with a tool held in the dominant hand.

Hawks are most often used by plasterers, along with finishing trowels, to apply a smooth finish of plaster to a wall. Brick pointers use hawks to hold mortar while they work. Hawks are also used to hold joint compound for taping and jointing.

The name "hawk" probably derives from the way the object rides on the user's arm, like a bird of prey.

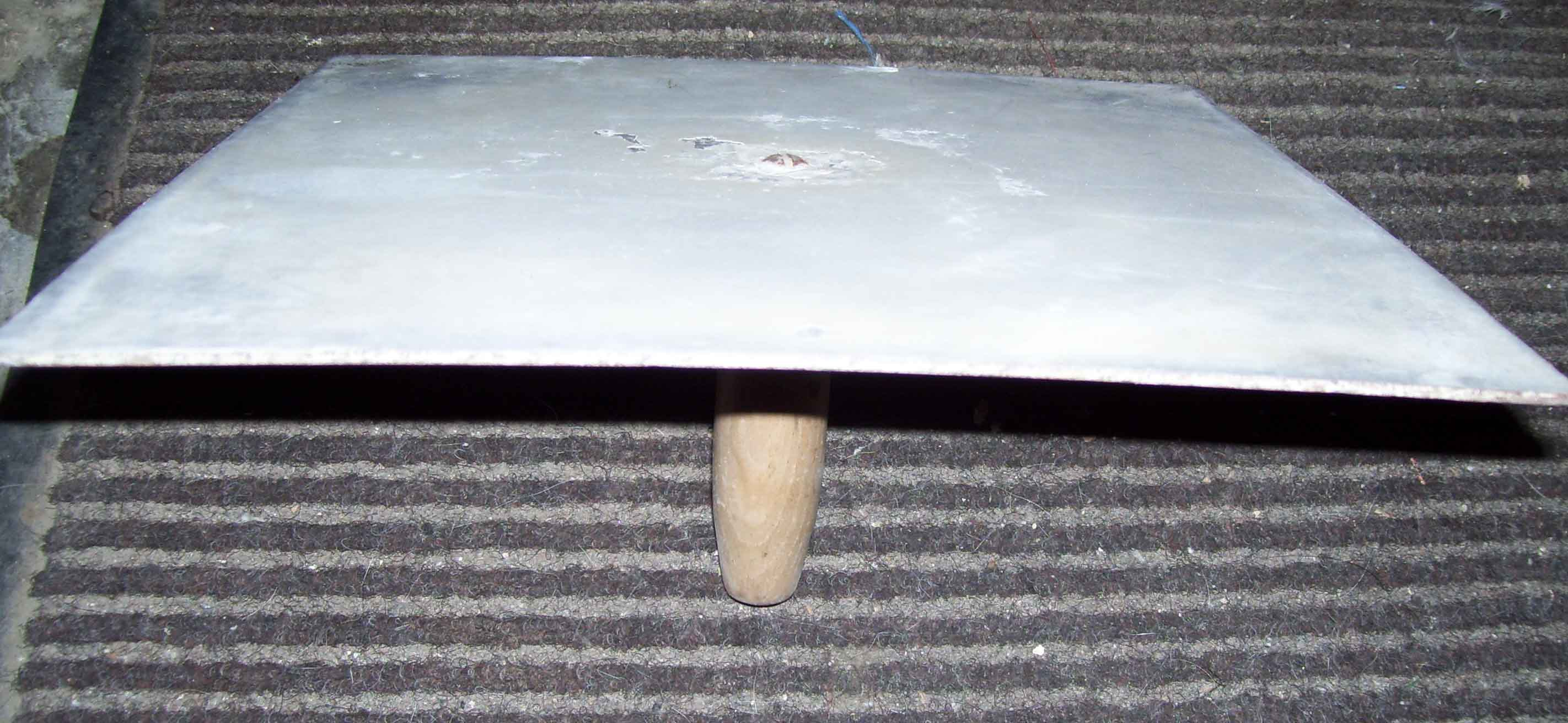
A plasterer's hawk set down after being used, with remnants of a substance like mortar or plaster
