= Hawks (surname) =

Hawks is a surname. Notable people with the surname include:

- Annie Hawks (1836–1918), American poet, gospel hymnist
- Bill Hawks (born 1944), American politician, former civil servant, and an agricultural businessman
- Candy Hawks-Massaroni (born 1980), American politician
- Charles Hawks, Jr. (1899–1960), Wisconsin politician
- Francis L. Hawks (1798–1866), American priest of the Episcopal Church, and a politician in North Carolina.
- Frank Hawks (1897–1938), American aviator, served in the U.S. Army in World War I, and record breaking aviator in 1920s and 1930s
- Eli Hawks (1829–1900), American politician
- Howard Hawks (1896–1977), American film director, producer and screenwriter
- John D. Hawks, anthropologist
- John Twelve Hawks, author of the 2005 dystopian novel The Traveler and its sequels
- Nelson Hawks (1840–1929), American typographer, notable for creating the 12-points-per-inch pica typographical standard
- Tony Hawks (born 1960), British comedian and author
