= Hawk (surname) =

Hawk is an English surname. Notable people with this surname include:

- A. J. Hawk (born 1984), professional football player for the Green Bay Packers
- David L. Hawk (born 1948), American management theorist, architect, and systems scientist
- Hamish Hawk (born 1991), Scottish musician
- Jeremy Hawk (1918–2002), English actor
- Susan Hawk (born 1961), truck driver and reality show contestant
- Susan Hawk (district attorney) (born c. 1970), Dallas County District Attorney
- Tony Hawk (born 1968), professional skateboarder
- Riley Hawk, (born 1992), professional skateboarder, son of Tony
