= USS Hawk =

Several ships of the United States Navy have been named USS Hawk, after the hawk, a bird of prey related to the falcon family, noted for its swiftness and grace in flight.

- USS Hawk (IX-14), was the converted yacht Hermione, purchased by the US Navy 2 April 1898, and served in various capacities until being sold in 1940
- USS Hawk (AM-133), was the converted trawler Gale acquired by the US Navy 1 January 1942 and sold in May 1944
- USS Hawk (AMS-17), was launched as YMS-362 on 22 May 1943 and served as a minesweeper until being struck from the Naval Register 17 October 1957
- USS Hawk (AM-400), was under construction but her contract was canceled on 12 August 1945
