= Falmouth Commodores =

Collegiate summer baseball team in Massachusetts

Information
- League: Cape Cod Baseball League (West Division)
- Location: Falmouth, Massachusetts
- Ballpark: Arnie Allen Diamond at Guv Fuller Field
- League championships: 1923, 1929, 1931, 1932, 1935, 1938, 1939, 1946, 1966, 1968, 1969, 1970, 1971, 1980
- Former name: Falmouth All-Stars; Falmouth Cottage Club
- Former ballpark(s): Central Park, Falmouth Heights
- Mascot: Homer
- President: Chris Fitzgerald
- General manager: Tyler Young
- Manager: Jack Dahm
- Website: www.capecodleague.com/falmouth/

The Falmouth Commodores are a collegiate summer baseball team based in Falmouth, Massachusetts. The team is a member of the Cape Cod Baseball League (CCBL) and plays in the league's West Division. The Commodores play their home games at Arnie Allen Diamond at Guv Fuller Field in Falmouth.

The Commodores most recently won the CCBL championship in 1980 when they defeated the Chatham A's in the championship series. The title was the team's sixth overall in the league's modern era, having won four consecutive league titles from 1968 to 1971. Since the club's inception, over 100 players have gone on to play in Major League Baseball.

== History ==
=== Pre-modern era ===
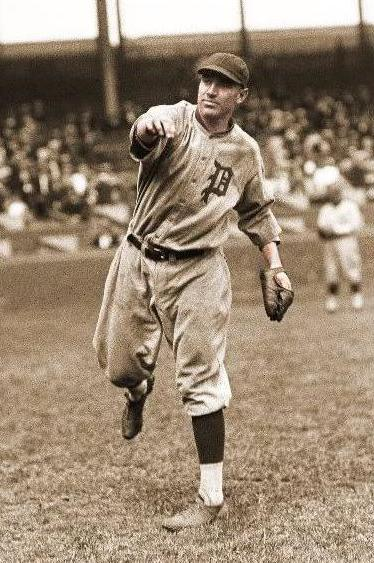
Hall of Famer Pie Traynor played for Falmouth in 1919.

==== Origins of baseball in Falmouth ====
Baseball has been played in Falmouth since the pre-Civil War days. The Barnstable Patriot reported on July 7, 1857 that, "the Fourth was celebrated at Falmouth by a game of base ball, in which some of the principal men of that place participated." In the late 19th and early 20th centuries, teams representing various Cape Cod towns routinely competed against one another. One particularly strong team was the Falmouth Heights Cottage Club team, whose name derived from the Falmouth Heights cottages where the players resided. Falmouth home games from the turn of the century through the early 1960s were played just steps from water's edge at the Central Park Field in Falmouth Heights. Spectators enjoyed an ocean view and a cool breeze as they took in the action at what was widely regarded as one of the most picturesque baseball settings in the nation.

During this era, attempts were made periodically to formalize league play among Cape Cod ballclubs. One such foray came in 1913 when Cottage Club manager H. Newton Marshall led the formation of a "Cape Cod Base Ball League". The league comprised six teams: Osterville, Pocasset, Orleans, Sandwich, South Yarmouth, and the Falmouth Heights Cottage Club, with each team playing each other team twice for a ten-game schedule. In what appears to have been the league's lone season, the Cottage Club claimed the pennant with a 9–1 record. Marshall was credited with "[turning] a rough field into one of the finest diamonds used for amateur base ball in this part of the country; ...equal in every respect to many of the major league diamonds," and with "[arousing] enthusiasm in base ball in Falmouth to such a pitch that people come from quite a distance to swell the crowds at the games." The team's popularity was such that Marshall, team captain Ralph Mendall, and the other Cottage Club players were celebrated in song at local theatrical performances.

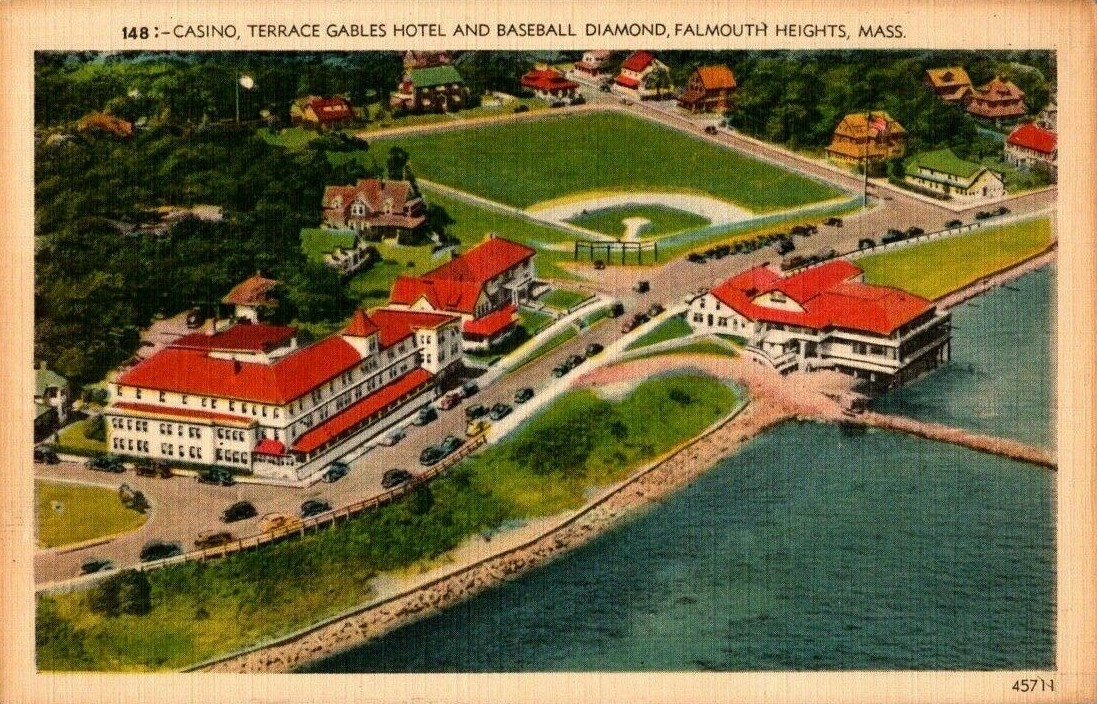
Early postcard depicting Central Park Field, Falmouth Heights

Marshall managed the team through 1916, and his teams featured several past and future major leaguers. Fletcher Low of Dartmouth College played for the Cottage Club in 1914 and then played briefly for the Boston Braves the following season. Former New York Highlanders hurler Ray Tift pitched for the Cottage Club late in 1914, after defeating Falmouth earlier in the season as a member of the West Somerville, Massachusetts town team. Horace "Hod" Ford played shortstop for Falmouth in 1915 and 1916, and went on to play 15 years in the major leagues. Falmouth pitcher Walt Whittaker hurled a no-hitter against Oak Bluffs in 1915, and then played briefly for Connie Mack's Philadelphia Athletics in 1916.

Available players and funding were at a premium as the U.S. became involved in World War I, but Falmouth was able to field a team in 1917 under manager Earl White, a season highlighted by a split doubleheader against the powerful visiting Crescent Athletic Club of Brooklyn, New York. In the 1918 and 1919 seasons, Falmouth combined players and resources with the Oak Bluffs town team in response to the war shortage. The 1918 team was managed by Lewis Whiting, and featured Dave Morey, who had played for the Philadelphia Athletics in 1913. Morey took over as player-manager of the combined team in 1919, and continued in that position for the Falmouth team in 1920 and 1921.

Morey's 1919 Falmouth-Oak Bluffs club featured Somerville, Massachusetts native Pie Traynor, a shortstop who batted .322 on the season. Prior to the Labor Day game at Falmouth Heights against a visiting Fall River club, Traynor displayed his all-around athleticism by winning a "circling the bases" competition in 15 seconds, as well as winning the sprinting and baseball throwing competitions. Traynor went on to play in the major leagues for seventeen seasons with the Pittsburgh Pirates, winning the World Series with Pittsburgh in 1925, and compiling a lifetime .320 batting average. Considered one of the greatest third basemen in major league history, Traynor was inducted into the National Baseball Hall of Fame in Cooperstown, New York in 1948, the first former Cape Leaguer to be so honored. In 2009 Traynor was inducted into the CCBL Hall of Fame.

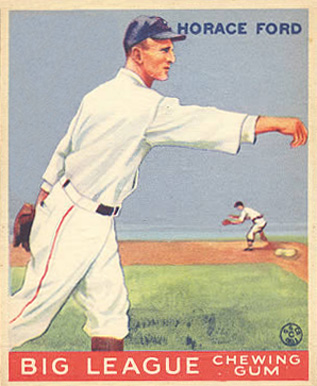
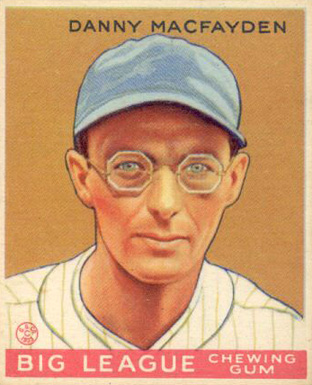
Horace "Hod" Ford played for Falmouth in 1915 and 1916 and went on to a 15-year major league career. CCBL Hall of Famer and Cape native Danny MacFayden played for Falmouth in 1925 and went on to a 17-year major league career.

==== The early Cape League era (1923–1939) ====
In 1923 the Cape Cod Baseball League was formed and included four teams: Falmouth, Chatham, Osterville, and Hyannis. This early Cape League operated through the 1939 season and disbanded in 1940, due in large part to the difficulty of securing ongoing funding during the Great Depression. Although the composition of the league changed from year to year as various teams joined or dropped out, Falmouth's entry alone lasted the entire span of the league's history.

During the 1920s, several future major leaguers played for Falmouth. Brown University pitcher Hal Neubauer pitched for Falmouth in 1923, and played for the Boston Red Sox two years later. His battery-mate at Falmouth was catcher Bill Cronin, who hit a whopping .420 in 1923. Cronin went on to play several seasons for the major league Boston Braves. Falmouth took the pennant in the league's inaugural 1923 season, posting a record of 9–3, while Chatham, Osterville and Hyannis finished in a three-way tie for second place with identical 5–7 records.

CCBL Hall of Famer Danny "Deacon" MacFayden, a Cape Cod native from Truro, played for Falmouth in 1925. The season was highlighted by MacFayden's one-hitter against Hyannis. By 1926, he was playing for the hometown Boston Red Sox and went on to pitch for 17 years in the major leagues, winning a World Series title with the New York Yankees in 1932. Haskell "Josh" Billings played for Falmouth from 1925 to 1927, was team MVP in 1925, and finished the 1927 season playing for the Detroit Tigers. National Football League running back Curly Oden spent his off-season as Falmouth's player-manager in 1927 and 1928. Oden was known as "the king of the base stealers in the league," having "thrilled the crowds on several occasions by stealing home." CCBL all-league catcher Gene Connell played for Falmouth from 1927 to 1929, and went on to play for the Philadelphia Phillies. Future major league umpire Bill Stewart pitched for Falmouth in 1929. Prior to joining Falmouth in 1929, shortstop Waddy MacPhee had played briefly for the New York Giants.

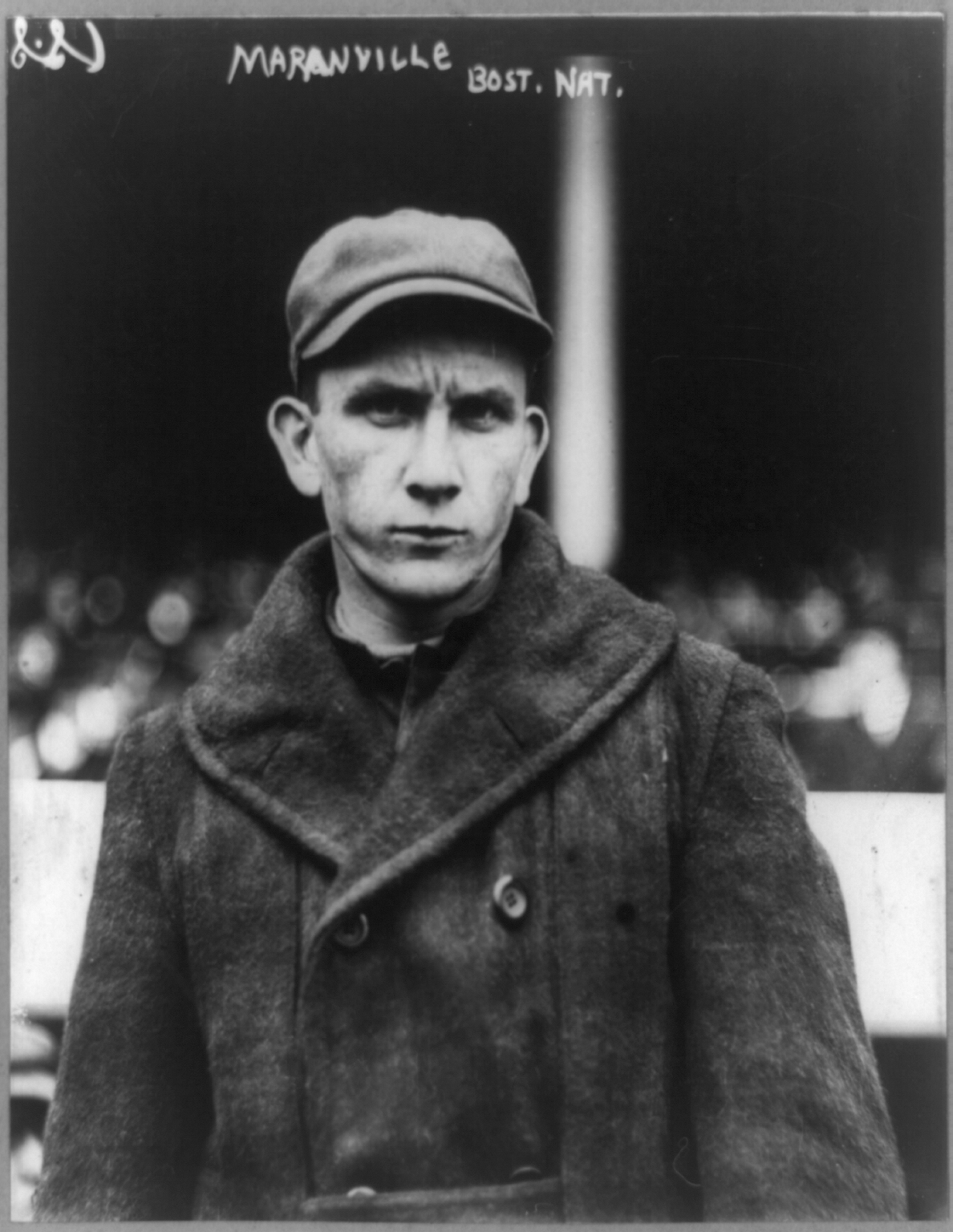
In 1931, Falmouth played a charity exhibition game against Baseball Hall of Famer Rabbit Maranville and the Boston Braves.

On August 26, 1929 the Falmouth team travelled to Rockland, Massachusetts to play a charity exhibition contest against the major league Boston Braves. Before a crowd of about four thousand, the big-leaguers won the game, 8–7, but the game was tight and Falmouth "not only outhit the major aggregation 13–11, but outplayed them in many departments of the game." The Braves featured Baseball Hall of Fame first baseman George Sisler, who went 0-for-3 in the game. Falmouth went on finish the 1929 season two games ahead of Chatham-Harwich to win the pennant and claim the Cape League championship. The exhibition contest with the Braves became an annual event into the mid-1930s, with Falmouth defeating the major leaguers on multiple occasions. Baseball Hall of Famer Rabbit Maranville played for the Braves in the 1931 Falmouth game. Falmouth also played exhibitions against well-known barnstorming teams such as the House of David, whom Falmouth defeated in a 1929 contest, the Lizzie Murphy All-Stars, who played Falmouth to a 2–2 tie in 1930, and the Philadelphia Giants, who defeated Falmouth in 1930 behind the celebrated battery of Will "Cannonball" Jackman and Burlin White.

In 1930, Holy Cross catcher Jack Walsh joined Falmouth and batted .360 for the season. From 1931 to 1935, Walsh was Falmouth's player-manager, and also managed the team in 1936. He led the league in batting in 1933 with a .362 average, and skippered the team to league championships in 1931, 1932 and 1935. Walsh posted a 170–109 won-loss record as manager and did not have a losing season. He was inducted into the CCBL Hall of Fame in 2007. One of Walsh's charges at Falmouth was pitcher Al Blanche, a Somerville, Massachusetts native who was part of Falmouth's 1931 title team and went on to play for the Boston Braves. Another member of the 1931 team was third baseman Al Niemiec of Holy Cross. Niemiec went on to play for the Boston Red Sox, and in 1937 was traded by the Red Sox with one other player to San Diego of the Pacific Coast League in exchange for a promising young "kid" named Ted Williams. 1933 Falmouth hurler Emil "Bud" Roy began the summer with Barnstable, finished it with Falmouth, and was playing with the Philadelphia Athletics in September.

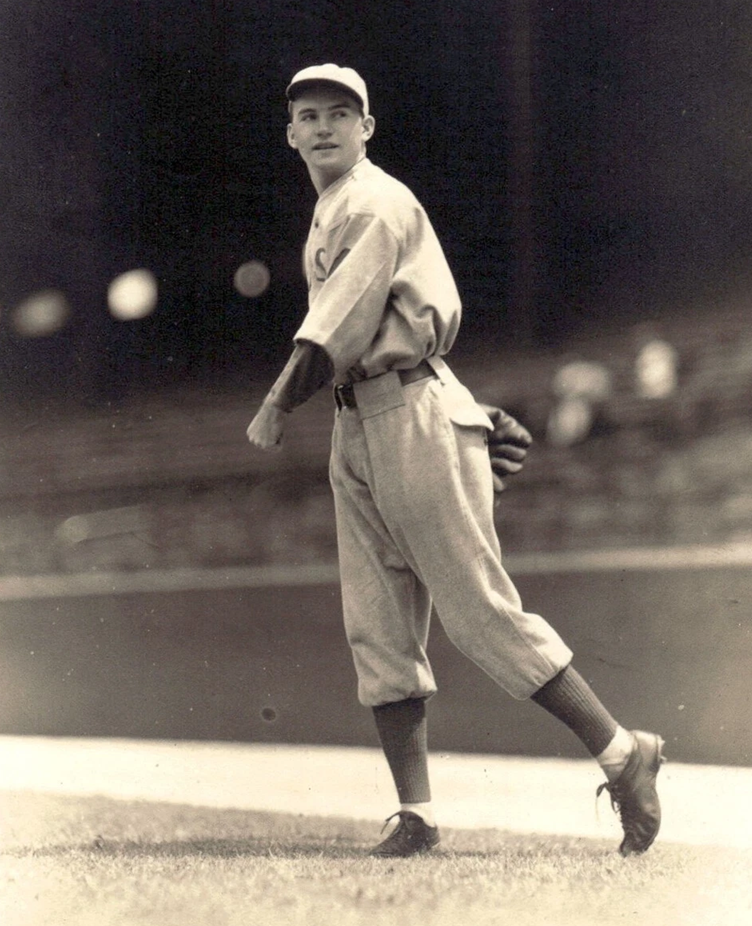
Jud McLaughlin of Falmouth's 1935 league championship club.

Walsh's 1935 Falmouth title team starred Bill "Lefty" Lefebvre, who went on to play for the Boston Red Sox and Washington Senators, and also featured pitcher Jud McLaughlin, who had played for the major league Red Sox a few years earlier. Due to a split regular season, the 1935 CCBL championship was decided by a best-of-five playoff between Falmouth and Barnstable. Falmouth sent Lefebvre to the mound in Game 1 at Hallet's Field, and took an 8–3 victory over Barnstable's ace Ted Olson in a pitching duel between future teammates for the 1938 Boston Red Sox. In Game 2 at home, Falmouth scratched out two runs in the bottom of the ninth to win, 3–2, and take a commanding series lead. Games 3 and 4 were played as a doubleheader, and Barnstable came out on top in both halves of the twinbill, 9–1 and 11–5, to even up the series. In Game 3 at Central Park Field, Barnstable slugger Jake Edwards hit a ball that crashed through the third-story window of a house just beyond the park's cozy right field, a blast that many Falmouth fans estimated was the longest seen at the field. The decisive Game 5 finale at Falmouth Heights was a rematch of moundsmen Lefebvre and Olson. With both hurlers pitching effectively, the game was tied, 2–2, with two out in the bottom of the ninth. Falmouth walked it off and took the title in exciting fashion when Jerry Shanahan scored on a hard line drive by Myron Ruckstull that resulted in an error off the usually reliable infielding glove of Barnstable's 18-year-old future major leaguer and CCBL Hall of Famer Lennie Merullo.

Joe Mulligan and Red Flaherty played for Falmouth in 1936. Mulligan had pitched for the Boston Red Sox in 1934, and Flaherty went on to enjoy a long major league umpiring career, officiating for over 20 years in the American League, including four World Series assignments. Falmouth's 1938 championship team featured burly slugger John Spirida, who went on to play pro football with the Washington Redskins the following year. The pitching star of the 1938 title team was former longtime major league hurler Rosy Ryan, who played in three World Series, and struck out the mighty Babe Ruth with the bases loaded in the 1923 World Series.

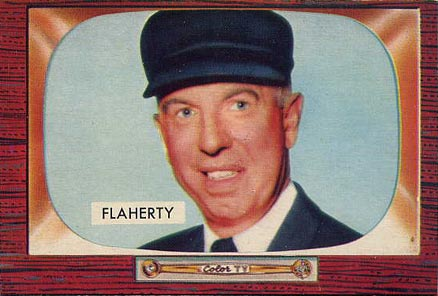
Red Flaherty played for Falmouth in 1936, then umpired in the American League for over 20 years.

In 1939, the final year of the early Cape League, night baseball was introduced for the first time. Portable lights were staged at the Falmouth Heights field and used for a game against Barnstable. The following night, the lights were transported to Hyannis for the second game of the home-and-home series between the two clubs. Falmouth went on to win its second consecutive league championship in 1939, led by Danvers, Massachusetts native Connie Creeden, who went on to play for the Boston Braves.

==== The Upper and Lower Cape League era (1946–1962) ====
The Cape League was revived after World War II and was originally composed of 11 teams across Upper Cape and Lower Cape divisions. Falmouth's entry in the Upper Cape Division was known as the Falmouth All-Stars, as the players were a collection of stars from Falmouth's in-town "twilight league".

Led by manager John DeMello, the All-Stars won the inaugural championship of the new Cape League in 1946. The team featured CCBL Hall of Famers Roche Pires and Manny Pena, both of whom became regular fixtures for the All-Stars during this period. Falmouth defeated Sagamore in a one-game playoff for the Upper Cape Division title, then met Lower Cape champion Harwich in the best-of-three championship series. Harwich took Game 1 at Brooks Park, 6–1, holding the All-Stars to just three hits. Game 2 was played on Labor Day at Falmouth Heights before a reported crowd of 3,000. Pires struck out seven, and was "seldom in trouble," as Falmouth capitalized on four Harwich errors to build an 8–0 lead before Harwich finally got on the board with a pair of homers in the seventh. The Harwichers rallied again in each of the final two frames, but Pires held them off and went the distance in a 10–6 win that knotted the series at one game apiece. After Game 2, a coin flip determined Falmouth would host Game 3 the following weekend, and the All-Stars sent Pires to the mound in the finale. The game was even at 3–3 through five frames, but again Harwich's errors were its downfall, leading to Falmouth rallies in the late innings that gave the All-Stars the 8–4 victory and the league crown. Falmouth's championship club was celebrated as playing a "forcing, aggressive type of ball" that "compared favorably with the old semi-pro teams" of Falmouth's pre-war era. Pires and Pena led Falmouth back to the championship series in 1949, but the club was downed by Lower Cape champ Orleans.

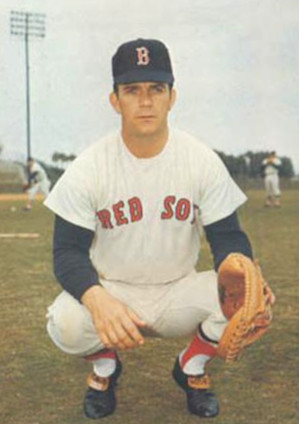
Russ Gibson hit two homers in his only game for Falmouth in 1957.

In 1951, Falmouth entered a second franchise in the Cape League. Described as "young and spirited," the Falmouth Falcons were composed mainly of players in their late teens and early twenties. The team played for three years in the Cape League, sharing the Falmouth Heights field with the All-Stars. The 1951 Falcons were skippered by player/manager Charlie "Wig" Robb, and after opening their inaugural campaign in respectable fashion by finishing the season's first half in second place in the Upper Cape Division, the team's outlook seemed promising. Falcons' hurler Charlie Eastman was the winning pitcher for the Upper Cape in its 5–3 victory over the Lower Cape in the 1951 CCBL All-Star Game, and was joined on the Upper Cape squad by fellow Falcons Joe Parent at shortstop and Robb at third base. Falmouth native Charlie Borden, who had spent time as a minor leaguer in the Chicago Cubs farm system, took over managerial duties and pitched for the Falcons in 1952. Eastman, Robb and Parent were all-stars again in 1952, along with Borden and catcher Jack Cavanaugh. After disappointing seasons by both Falmouth teams in 1952, a merger for the following season was discussed, but the Falcons were not keen to the idea. Town funds were appropriated for only one team in 1953, but the Falcons remained in the league through independent financial support, led by new skipper Phil White. The season was the final one for the Falcons, as the teams were finally merged for the 1954 season.

Fall River, Massachusetts native and future Boston Red Sox catcher Russ Gibson had just joined Falmouth in 1957 when he was signed by Boston. In his only game with Falmouth, he hit two home runs.

=== Modern era (1963–present) ===
==== The 1960s: A new league, a new park, a new name ====
In 1963, the CCBL was reorganized and became officially sanctioned by the NCAA. The league would no longer be characterized by "town teams" who fielded mainly Cape Cod residents, but would now be a formal collegiate league. Teams began to recruit college players and coaches from an increasingly wide geographic radius.

The league was originally composed of ten teams, which were divided into Upper Cape and Lower Cape divisions. Falmouth joined Wareham, Cotuit, Bourne and Sagamore in the Upper Cape Division. In 1964 the Falmouth All-Stars moved from the Falmouth Heights field and began playing home games at Guv Fuller Field. The following year, the team's name was changed to the Falmouth Commodores.

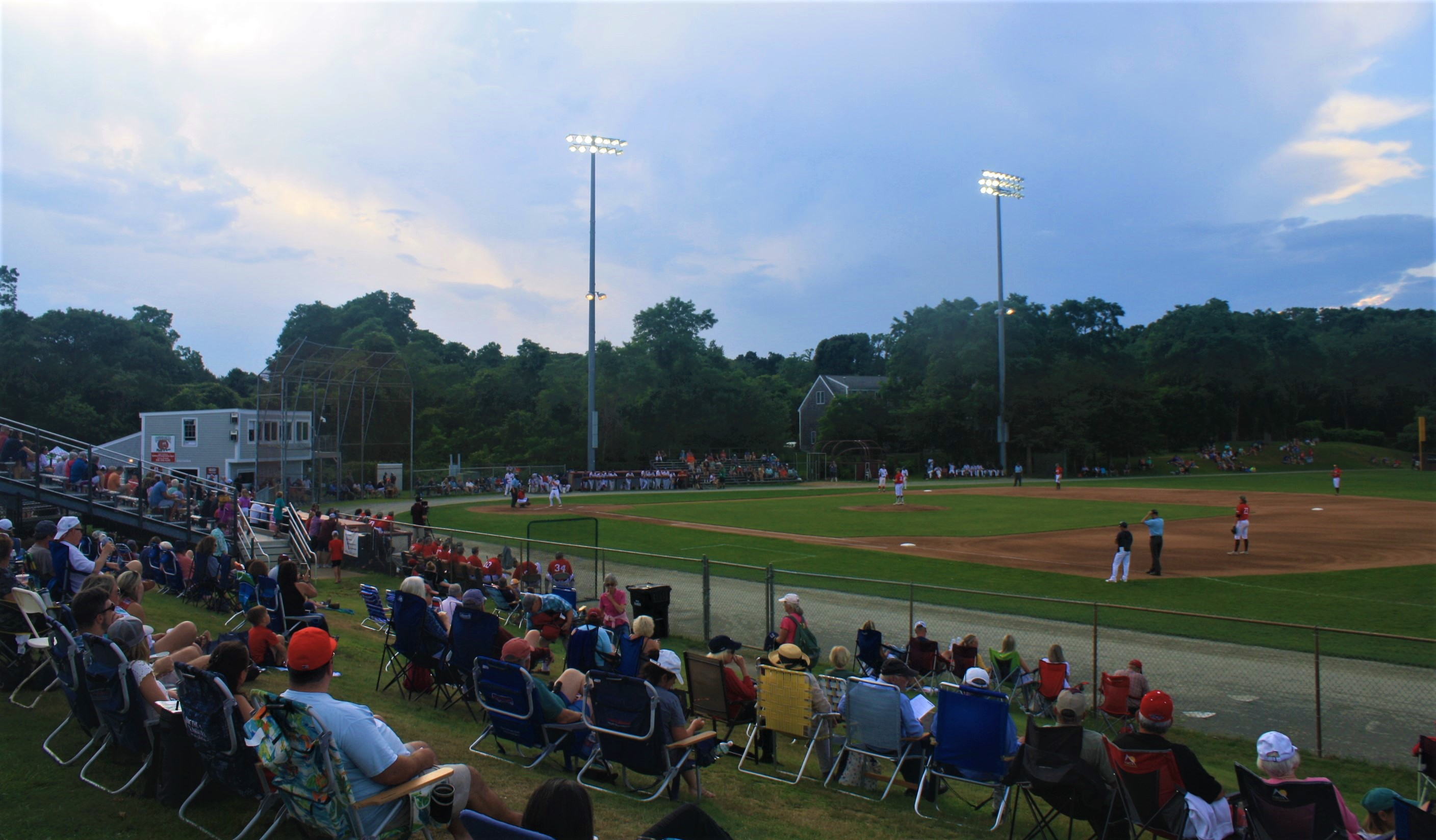
Arnie Allen Diamond at Guv Fuller Field has been home of the Commodores since the 1960s.

Falmouth was the dominant team in the Cape League from the mid-1960s through the early 1970s. Led by CCBL Hall of Fame manager Bill Livesey, Falmouth reached the Cape League championship series six consecutive times beginning in 1966, winning the title in five of six years, including four consecutive titles from 1968 to 1971.

Livesey's 1966 title team featured CCBL Hall of Fame pitcher Noel Kinski, a three-time all star who had played for Bourne and Sagamore in the previous two seasons. Kinski went 7–3 with a 3.15 ERA and was the Upper Cape Division's starting All-Star Game pitcher for Falmouth in 1966. The club also featured another Sagamore castoff in University of Connecticut slugger Ron Bugbee, who had won the CCBL MVP award with Sagamore in 1965. After finishing the regular season atop the Upper Cape division, the Commodores faced Lower Cape champ Chatham in the best-of-five 1966 title series. Falmouth dropped Game 1 at Veterans Field, but rebounded in Game 2 at home behind a 1–0 complete game shutout by Kinski. Game 3 was a 7–3 win on the road for Falmouth, setting up a classic series clincher at Guv Fuller Field in Game 4. With the Commodores down, 4–3 in the seventh inning, Bugbee, who had so far gone hitless in the series, blasted a two-run homer to put Falmouth up, 5–4. Clinging to a one-run lead with no outs and a runner on first in the top of the ninth, Livesey called to the bullpen for Kinski. The ace lefty proceeded to pick off the runner, then struck out Chatham all-stars Steve Saradnik and George Greer to give the Commodores the championship. The two teams met again for the title in 1967, with Chatham coming out on top.

The 1968 Commodores championship team included Worcester, Massachusetts native Pat Bourque, who went on to win a World Series with the 1973 Oakland A's. The Commodores met Harwich in the best-of-five 1968 championship series, and dropped Game 1 at Whitehouse Field. Falmouth stormed back with a 6–1 win in Game 2 at home, powered by slugger Mike Finnell, who launched a two-run homer and scored four of the team's six runs. Finnell was at it again in Game 3 on the road, blasting another four-bagger as the Commodores took a two-games-to-one series lead. The exciting Game 4 finale at Guv Fuller Field found the score tied at 10–10 and the bases loaded for Falmouth in the bottom of the tenth. The Commodores walked off with the championship as Stephen Greenberg, son of Baseball Hall of Famer Hank Greenberg, drew a base on balls off Harwich's CCBL Hall of Fame hurler Pete Ford to force in the series-winning run.

Ace pitcher and CCBL Hall of Famer Paul Mitchell starred for Falmouth from 1969 to 1971. He was named the league's Outstanding Pitcher in 1969 and 1970, and was the winning pitcher in the league all star game in 1970 and 1971. In three seasons, Mitchell won 25 games for the Commodores, posting a 1.53 ERA with 317 strikeouts and 28 complete games. In the 1969 title series against Chatham, Falmouth dropped Game 1 in Chatham, being no-hit into the sixth inning, and ending up with only two hits in Chatham's 4–0 victory. But the Commodores stormed back in Game 2 at Guv Fuller Field as Paul Mitchell was the hero on the mound and contributed a home run in a 9–4 victory that set up the decisive third game. Falmouth's Mickey Karkut twirled a complete game gem and the Commodores came out on top, 5–2, to secure their second consecutive league title.

==== Livesey's "four-peat" launches the 1970s ====
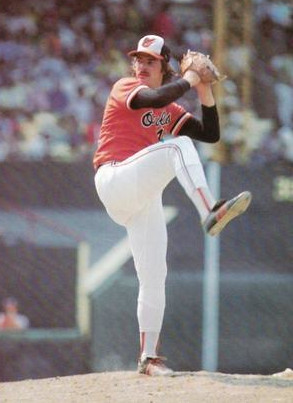
CCBL Hall of Famer Mike Flanagan played for Falmouth under skipper Bill Livesey in the early 1970s.

Returning to the championship series in 1970, the Commodores faced the Orleans Cardinals. Falmouth lefty Jim Jachym shut out the Cards in Game 1, 2–0. The Commodores sent ace Paul Mitchell to the mound with ideas of a sweep in Game 2 at Eldredge Park. Falmouth jumped out to an early 3–0 lead in the top of the first, but Orleans answered in the bottom half to go ahead 4–3. The Cardinals took a 7–5 lead into the top of the ninth, but the Commodores rallied to go ahead 8–7, and Mitchell nailed down the series-clinching victory by striking out the side in the bottom of the ninth.

The 1971 title series was a best-of-five series, and was a rematch of the prior year, with the Commodores facing Orleans. The Cardinals took the Game 1 pitcher's duel at Guv Fuller, 1–0, on a homer by Brad Linden. Game 2 in Orleans also ended with a 1–0 tally, but this time the Commodores were on top to tie the series. Falmouth sent Paul Mitchell to the hill for Game 3 at home, and the ace came through with a 3–1 victory behind a three-run dinger by Kevin Bryant. An ugly sixth-inning brawl involving players, umpires and fans marred Game 4 at Eldredge Park. Skipper Livesey was tossed in the eighth, and Orleans went on to win, 7–5, to tie the series at two games apiece. Like Games 1 and 2, Game 5 at Guv Fuller Field was a pitcher's duel that ended with just a single run being scored. Commodores hurler Bob Lukas was dominating, allowing just five hits while striking out 16. The decisive run came in the bottom of the seventh, as Dave Creighton walked and stole second, then scored the series-winning run on a Ray O'Brien single to left. The win gave Falmouth its fourth consecutive championship, and fifth in six years.

Falmouth's 1972 team featured CCBL batting champ Ed Orrizzi (.372) and future major leaguers Billy Almon and Mike Flanagan. Flanagan went 7–1 for the season with a 2.18 ERA while also belting seven home runs; he went on to win a World Series and Cy Young Award with the Baltimore Orioles, and was inducted into the CCBL Hall of Fame in 2000. Due to a scheduling conflict with the Atlantic Collegiate Baseball League, the 1972 CCBL All-Star Game was contested between the CCBL all-stars and the defending champion Falmouth team at Guv Fuller field. The game was won by Falmouth, 8–1, with the home team's Mike Flanagan getting the victory.

With Livesey's departure after the 1972 season, Falmouth struggled for most of the rest of the 1970s, reaching the league championship only once, losing to Cotuit in 1975. The '70s dropoff reached its low point in 1977 when the team was forced to withdraw from the league mid-season, "plagued by injuries and lack of employment for its players." 1979 provided a sign of good things to come when CCBL Hall of Famer Billy Best hit .398 for the Commodores, and set league records with a 32-game hitting streak and at least one base hit in 39 of his 41 games played.

==== The 1980s and a return to championship form ====
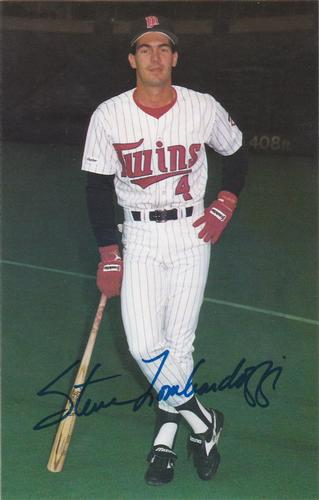
Steve Lombardozzi played for the 1980 CCBL champion Commodores.

In 1980, the Commodores welcomed the new decade by returning to the league championship series. Led by manager Al Worthington, the 1980 team featured future major leaguers Sid Bream and Steve Lombardozzi. After disposing of Cotuit in the semi-finals, the Commodores met the first place Chatham Athletics in the best-of-five title series. Falmouth took the first two games, but dropped the next two, setting up the pivotal Game 5 in Chatham. In the finale, Falmouth took the lead early when Bruce Helser drove in Tom "Bat" Masterson in the second inning. The run was the only one the Commodores needed. Falmouth starter Mark Winters, a 6-foot-6 southpaw, took advantage of swirling Veterans Field winds to keep Chatham hitters at bay, tossing a four-hit shutout en route to Falmouth's decisive 5–0 victory. The championship was Falmouth's sixth of the modern era, and 14th overall.

The 1980s saw two Falmouth players post batting averages that are among the highest in Cape League history. In 1981, CCBL Hall of Famer Sam Nattile batted .443 with 70 hits and eight home runs for the Commodores. Nattile also belted a game-tying home run at the league's all star game at Fenway Park, a game that ended in a 4–4 tie. Hometown star Bob Allietta took the reins as Commodores field manager in 1983. A graduate of Falmouth's Lawrence High School, Allietta had played for the Commodores in 1970 and had gone on to play in the major leagues for the California Angels in the mid-1970s. The 1984 Falmouth team was skippered by CCBL Hall of Fame manager Ed Lyons, and featured CCBL Hall of Famers Jim McCollom, who batted .413 and slugged a league-high 15 home runs, and Doug Fisher, a first baseman who tied the league's single-season RBI record with 54, and finished just behind McCollom with 14 homers.

==== The 1990s ====
The 1991 Falmouth team was led by skipper Dan O'Brien, a former Cape Leaguer with Chatham who had gone on to play for the St. Louis Cardinals. In 1992 and 1993, the Commodores were piloted by CCBL Hall of Famer Arthur "Ace" Adams, who had played for the team in the early 1970s and was a league all-star in 1973. A colorful character, Ace's Falmouth baseball roots ran deep: not only had his father also played in the Cape League, but his father first met Ace's mother at Falmouth Heights field.

CCBL Hall of Fame manager Harvey Shapiro took the Falmouth helm in 1994, and led the team through 1998. The 1994 Commodores team featured several outstanding players. CCBL Hall of Famer and future major league all-star Darin Erstad was the Cape League's MVP. Joining him were the league's Outstanding Pitcher and fellow CCBL Hall of Famer, Bob St. Pierre, as well as the league's Outstanding Relief Pitcher, Scott Winchester. Winchester set a league record with 13 saves, while St. Pierre went 9–1 with a 1.44 ERA and 72 strikeouts in 75 innings.

Falmouth reached the league championship only once in the 1990s, as the 1996 Commodores were carried by CCBL Hall of Fame pitcher Eric Milton's microscopic 0.21 ERA, but lost to Chatham in the title series. Milton's season was highlighted by his no-hitter against Orleans in which he came within one walk of a perfect game. The Commodores took home individual honors in 1997 as Jason Edgar was named MVP of the CCBL All-Star Game, and in 1999 when Doc Brooks became the first Commodore to win the CCBL All-Star Game Home Run Derby.

==== The 2000s ====
The Commodores reached the CCBL championship series twice in the 2000s, but were swept by Y-D in both 2004 and 2007. The 2004 Falmouth team featured CCBL Hall of Fame shortstop Cliff Pennington and future Boston Red Sox star Jacoby Ellsbury, and in both seasons the Commodores were led by the league's MVP. In 2004 the MVP was CCBL Hall of Famer Daniel Carte, and in 2007 it was fellow CCBL Hall of Famer Conor Gillaspie. Carte began the 2004 season in an 0-for-19 slump, but busted out of it with his first three hits, all home runs. He led the league with 11 homers and 38 RBI, and his .308 average left him just 19 points shy of the triple crown. Gillaspie finished the 2007 season tops in the league in batting with a .345 mark, and also led the league in slugging and extra-base hits.

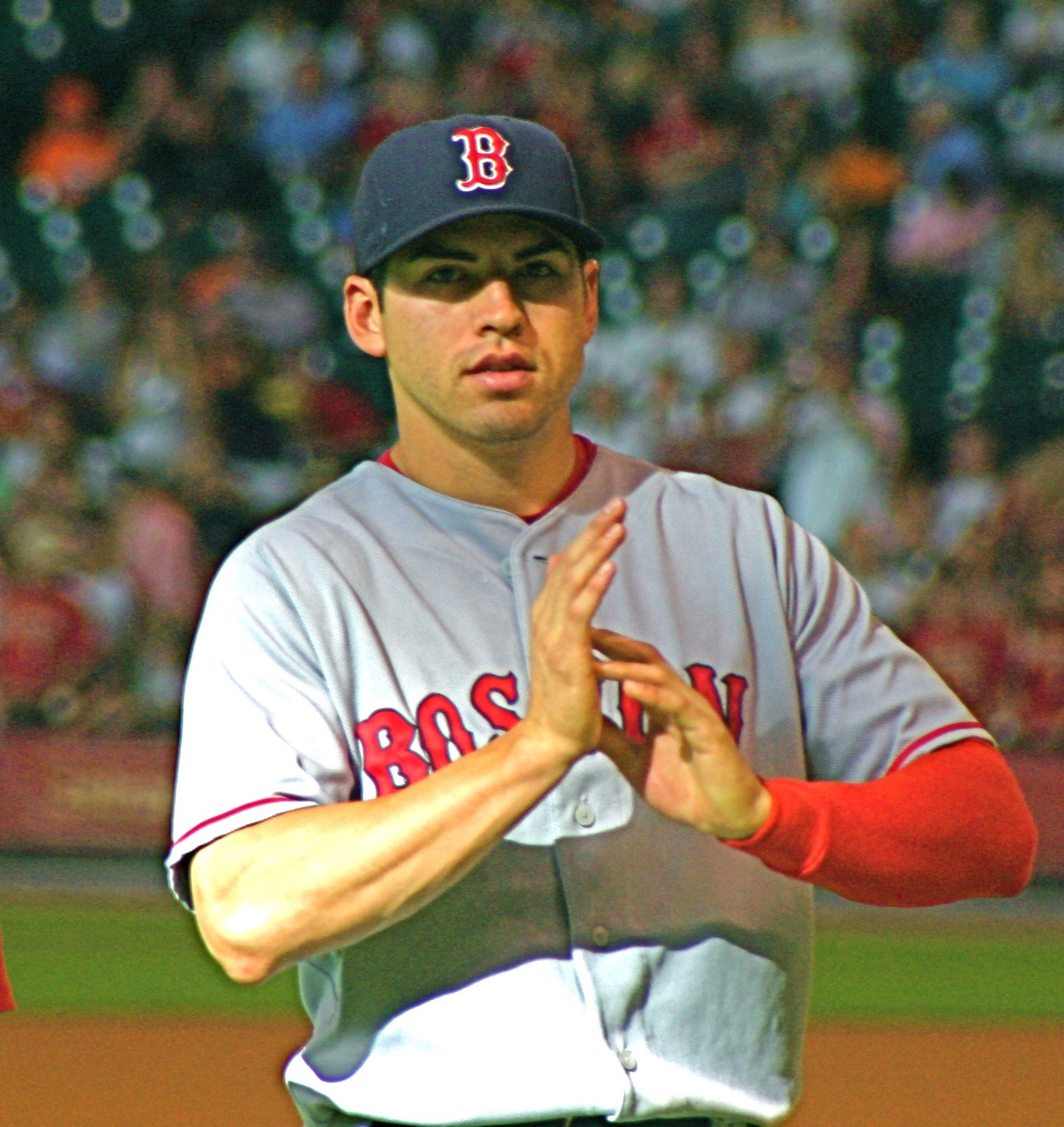
Jacoby Ellsbury played for the Commodores in 2004.

2005 Commodore Tim Norton was co-recipient of the league's Outstanding Pitcher Award, posting a 5–1 record with a 1.77 ERA and 77 strikeouts against only 15 walks in 61 innings. The 2006 season featured a combined no-hitter tossed by Commodore hurlers Kris Dobrowiecki, Sean Morgan, Brandon Copp and Sam Demel against Bourne. Future major league all-star pitcher Aaron Crow was the CCBL's Outstanding Pro Prospect in 2007. In 2008, another future MLB all-star, A.J. Pollock, took home the league's MVP Award, batting .377 with 61 hits. Jimmy Cesario led the Cape League with a .387 batting average in 2008, and CCBL Hall of Famer Todd Cunningham did the same in 2009 with his .378 mark on the way to being named the league's Outstanding Pro Prospect.

Longtime Commodore volunteer Arnie Allen received the league's inaugural Lifetime Achievement Award in 2002, and in 2004 the diamond at Guv Fuller Field was named Arnie Allen Diamond in his memory. CCBL Hall of Fame skipper Jeff Trundy surpassed Bill Livesey in 2007 as the longest-tenured manager in Falmouth history, a mark Trundy proceeded to leave far behind.

==== The 2010s ====
The Commodores qualified for postseason play in nine of ten years in the 2010s, and reached the CCBL championship three times. Falmouth was bounced from the championship series in 2011 by Harwich. In 2014 and 2016, the Commodores ran into old nemesis Y-D, who defeated Falmouth for a pair of titles as they had done the decade before. From 2016 to 2019, the Commodores finished the regular season atop the league's West Division three out of four years, but were bumped from the playoffs in each season.

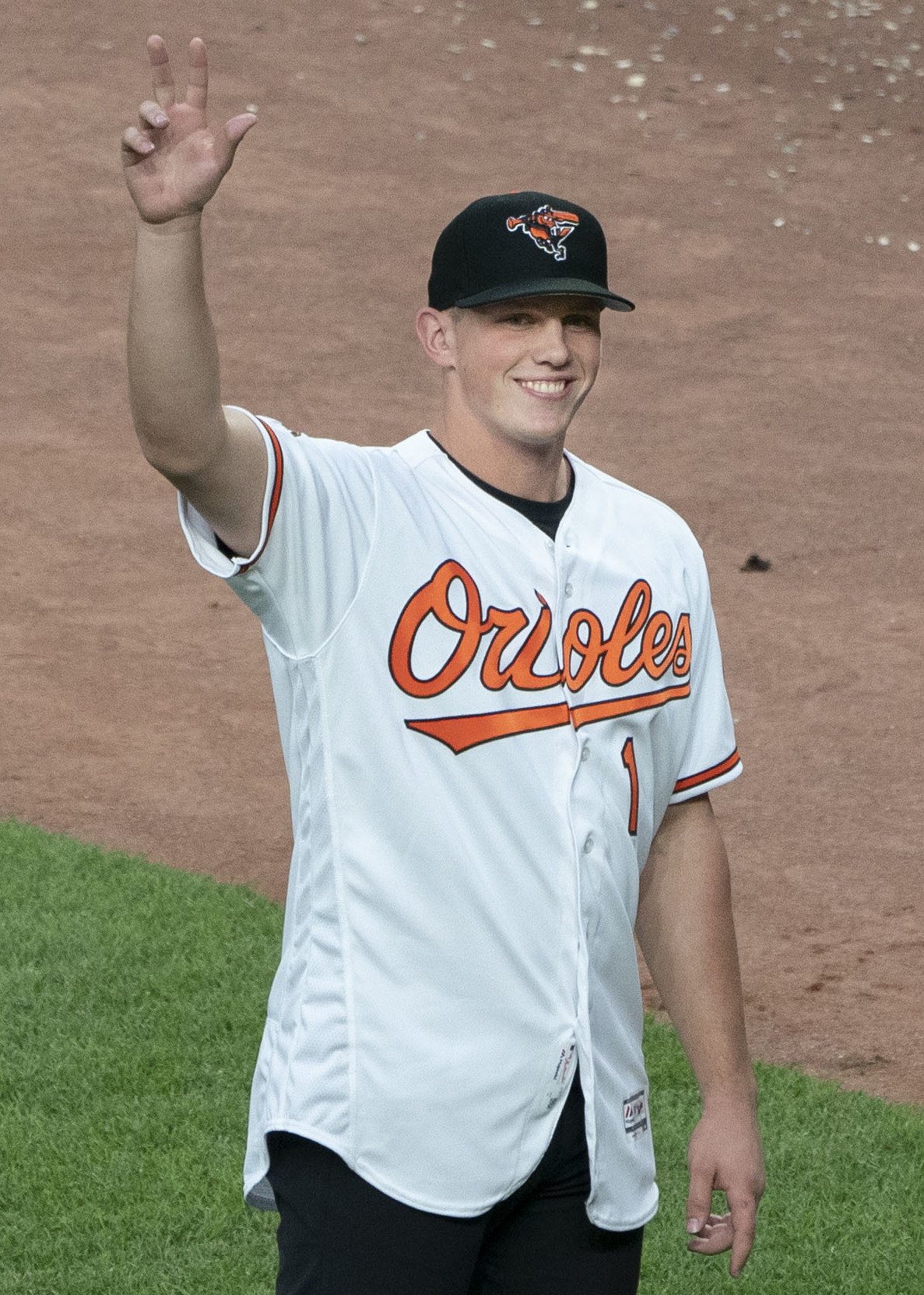
2017 Commodore Adley Rutschman was selected first overall in the 2019 MLB draft.

North Dighton, Massachusetts native and Holy Cross hurler Nate Koneski was the league's Outstanding New England Player in 2011, posting a 1.03 ERA with 24 strikeouts in 26.1 innings. Falmouth's 2013 and 2014 teams starred CCBL Hall of Fame shortstop Kevin Newman, who led the league in batting both seasons, the first player in the league's modern era to win back-to-back batting titles. Newman hit .375 in his first season, then bettered his mark by 10 points the following season, and was named 2014 league MVP. The 2016 Commodores featured the league's Outstanding Pro Prospect, Michael Gigliotti, as well as the league's Outstanding Pitcher, Jeff Passantino. Adley Rutschman played for Falmouth in 2017 and went on to be selected first overall in the 2019 MLB draft. In 2019, Falmouth featured league Outstanding Relief Pitcher Zach Brzykcy and league batting champ Zach DeLoach (.353).

==== The 2020s ====
The 2020 CCBL season was cancelled due to the coronavirus pandemic. The 2023 Commodores were led by second baseman Travis Bazzana, the league's MVP and batting champ, who notched a .375 average with six homers, 31 RBI and 14 stolen bases, and first baseman Tyler MacGregor, a Peabody, Massachusetts native from Northeastern University who batted .318 and took home the Outstanding New England Player award. Longtime skipper Jeff Trundy's tenure came to an end after the 2024 season, and former Boston Red Sox star Jarrod Saltalamacchia, who had been an assistant coach with Bourne for several seasons, took over managerial duties in 2025.

== CCBL Hall of Fame inductees ==
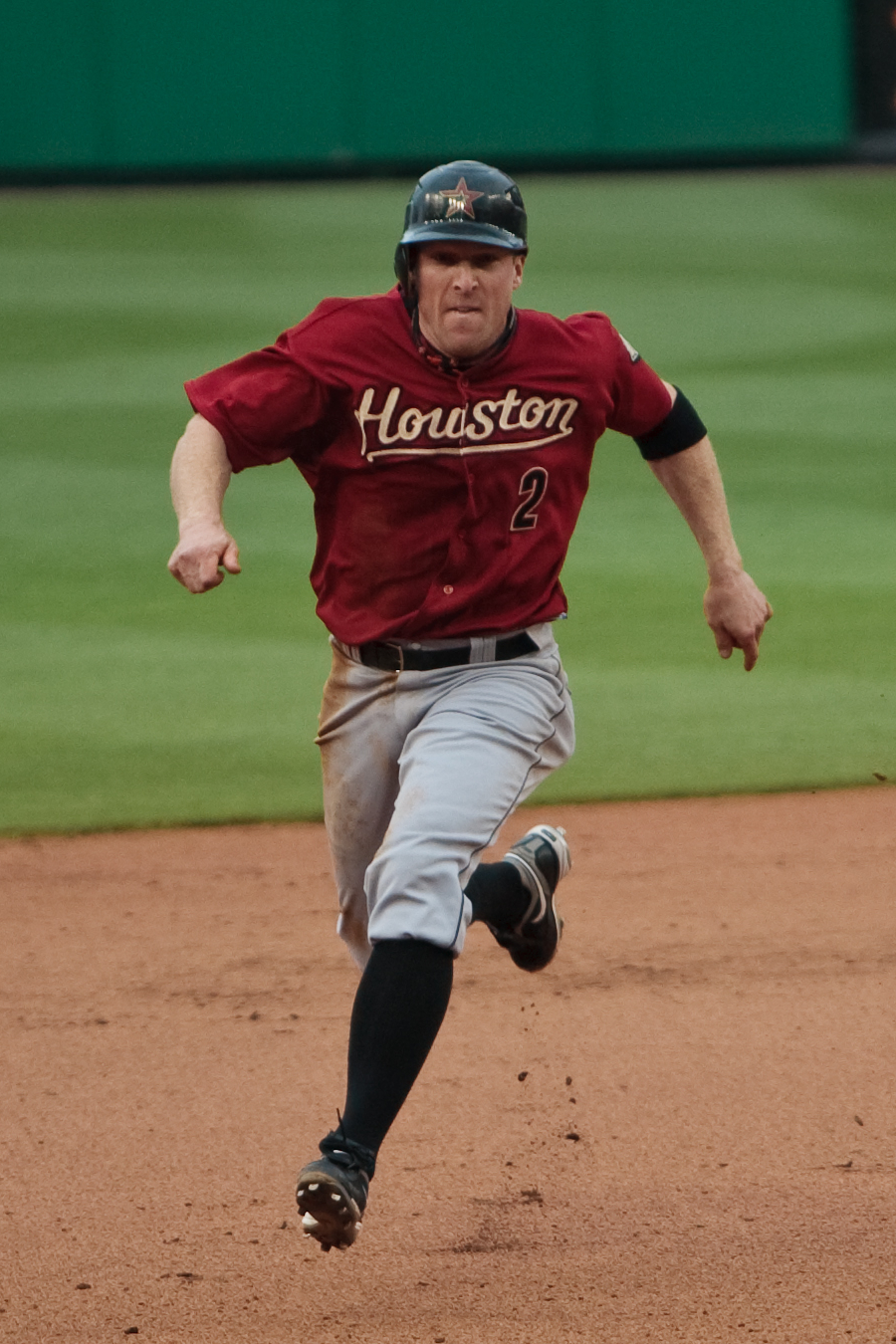
CCBL Hall of Famer Darin Erstad

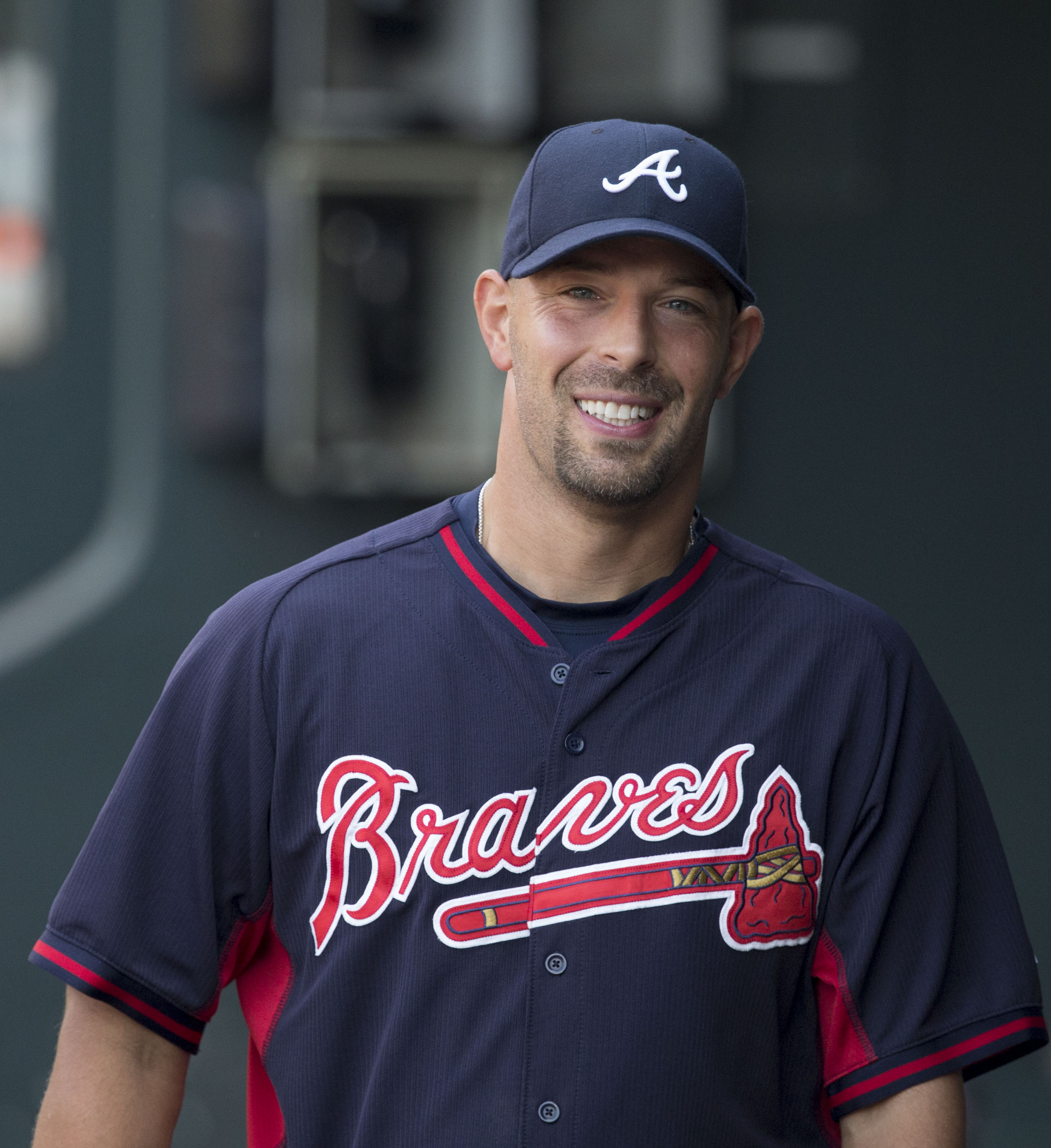
CCBL Hall of Famer David Aardsma

The CCBL Hall of Fame and Museum is a history museum and hall of fame honoring past players, coaches, and others who have made outstanding contributions to the CCBL. Below are the inductees who spent all or part of their time in the Cape League with Falmouth.

Year Inducted	Ref.	Name	Position
2000		Mike Flanagan	Player
2000		Ed Lyons	Manager
2001		Darin Erstad	Player
2002		Bill Livesey	Manager
2002		Paul Mitchell	Player
2003		Noel Kinski	Player
2004		Eric Milton	Player
2005		Sam Nattile	Player
2005		Manny Pena	Player
2006		Steve Balboni	Player
2007		Jack Walsh	Player / Manager
2008		Roche Pires	Player
2009		Pie Traynor	Player
2010		David Aardsma	Player
2011		Doug Fisher	Player
2012		Billy Best	Player
2012		Danny “Deacon” MacFayden	Player
2013		Daniel Carte	Player
2014		Bob St. Pierre	Player
2016		Jim McCollom	Player
2017		Chuck Sturtevant	Executive
2018		Arthur "Ace" Adams	Player / Manager
2019		Conor Gillaspie	Player
2020		Kevin Newman	Player
2020		Cliff Pennington	Player
2020		Harvey Shapiro	Manager
2024		Todd Cunningham	Player
2024		Jeff Trundy	Manager

== Notable alumni ==
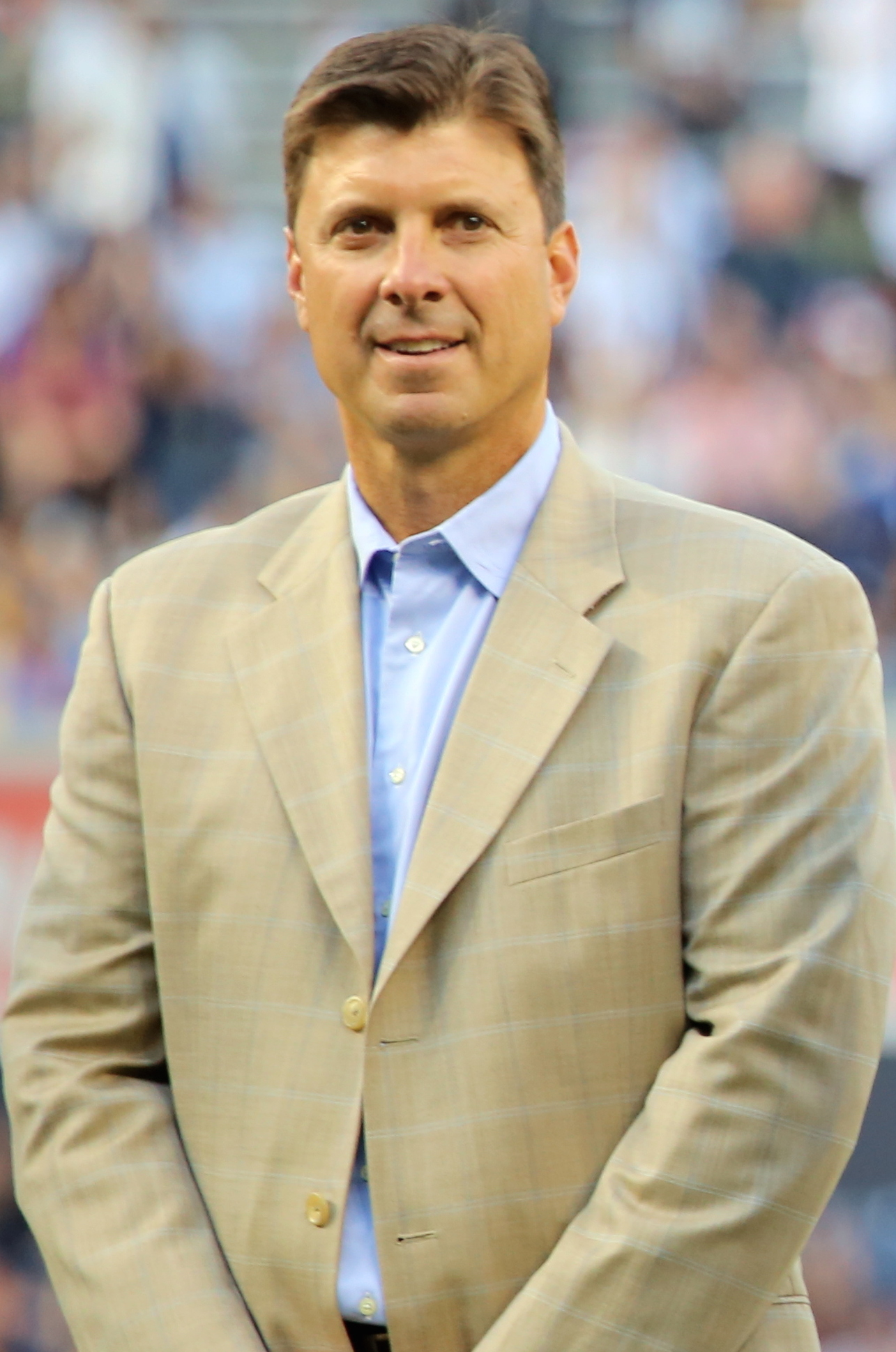
Tino Martinez

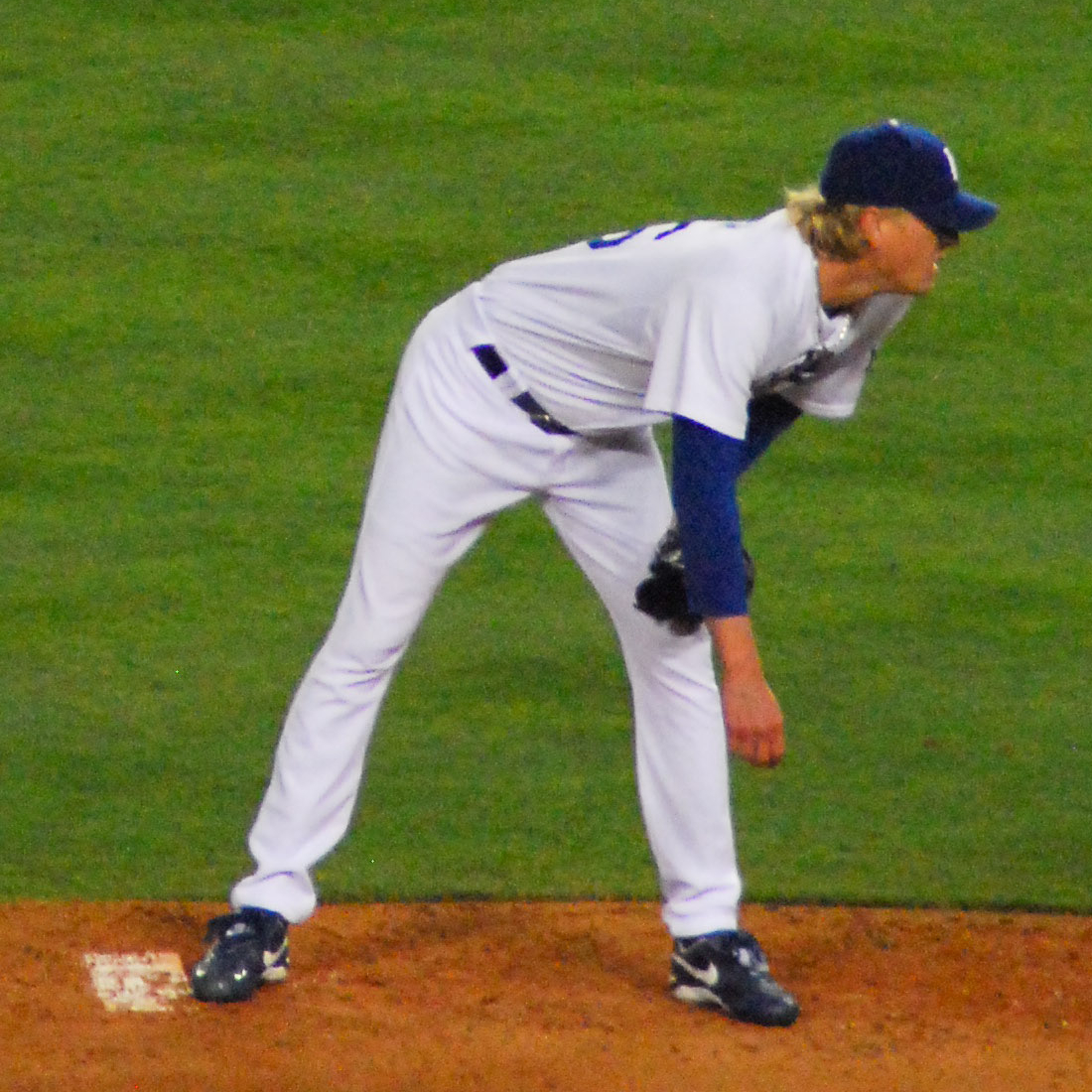
Jeff Weaver

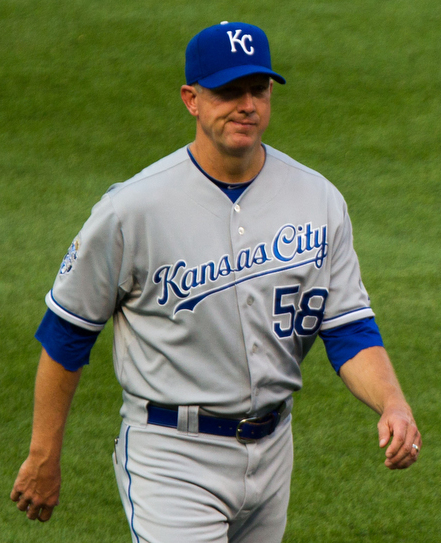
Dave Eiland

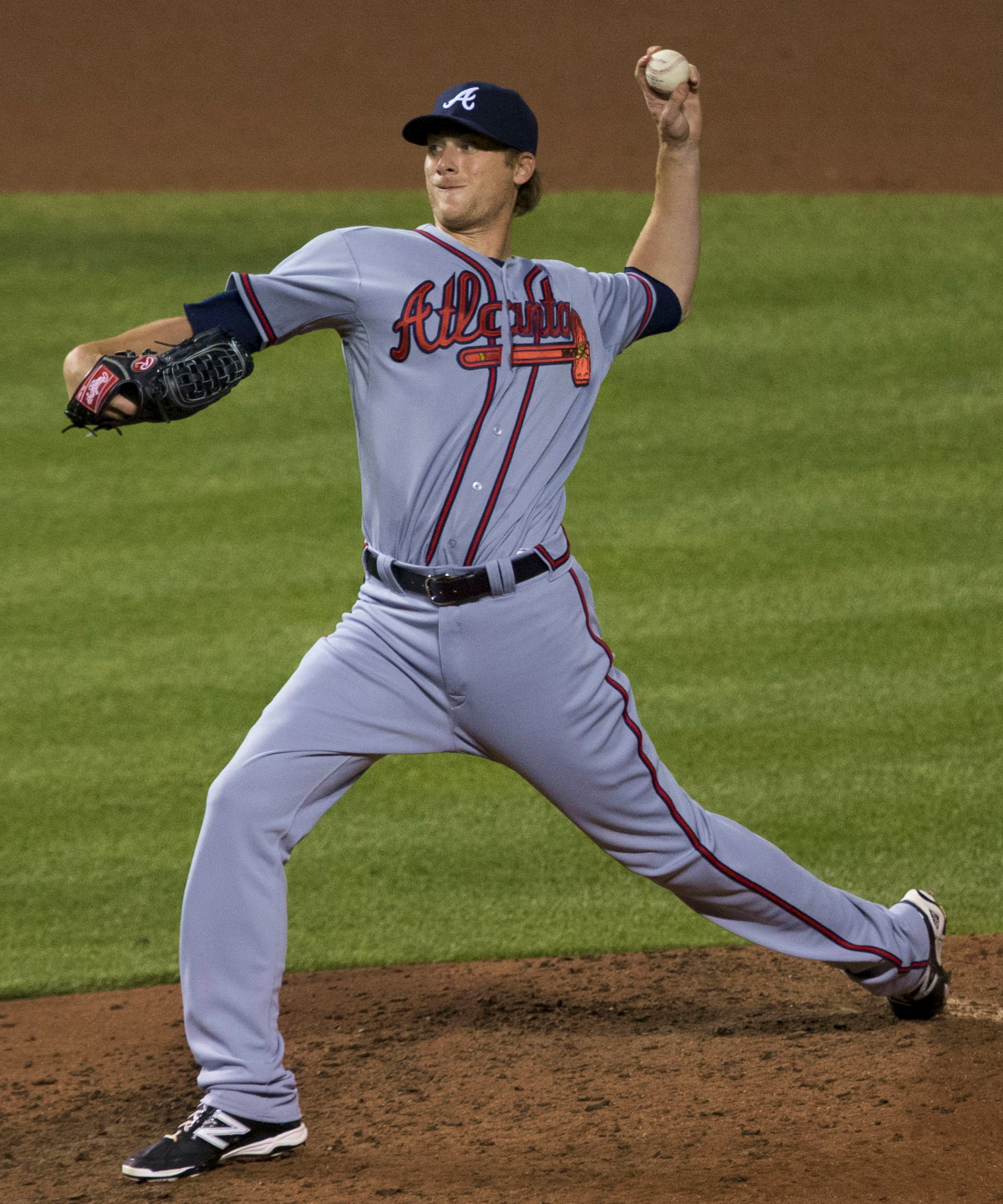
Ross Detwiler

- David Aardsma 2002
- Philip Abner 2022
- David Adams 2007
- Robby Ahlstrom 2019
- Maui Ahuna 2021–2022
- Franco Alemán 2019
- Bob Allietta 1970
- Bill Almon 1972–1973
- Matt Antonelli 2004–2005
- Steve Balboni 1976
- Scott Bandura 2023
- Philip Barzilla 2000
- Travis Bazzana 2023
- Kevin Bazzell 2023
- Chad Bettis 2008
- Haskell "Josh" Billings 1925–1927
- Jake Bird 2016
- Al Blanche 1931
- Brian Bocock 2005
- Brian Bogusevic 2004
- Alec Bohm 2017
- Pat Bourque 1968
- Kyle Bradish 2017
- Sid Bream 1980
- Josh Breaux 2017
- Will Brennan 2018
- John Briscoe 1987
- Rex Brothers 2008
- Cliff Brumbaugh 1994
- Zach Brzykcy 2019
- Dallas Buck 2004–2005
- Mitch Canham 2006
- Scott Carroll 2006
- Kevin Cash 1999
- Ben Casparius 2019
- Preston Claiborne 2007–2008
- Garrett Cleavinger 2013–2014
- Charlie Condon 2023
- Gene Connell 1927–1929
- P.J. Connelly 2004
- Connie Creeden 1939
- Kevin Cron 2013
- Bill Cronin 1923–1924
- Declan Cronin 2018
- Aaron Crow 2007
- Trei Cruz 2019
- Todd Cunningham 2009
- Logan Davidson 2017–2018
- Kyle DeBarge 2023
- Zach DeLoach 2019
- Sam Demel 2005–2006
- Ross Detwiler 2006
- Carlos Diaz 1984
- Bill Doran 1977
- Kelly Dransfeldt 1995–1996
- Shane Drohan 2019
- Tyler Duffey 2011
- Steven Duggar 2014
- Blake Dunn 2019
- Tyler Dyson 2018
- Jonathan Dziedzic 2012
- Dave Eiland 1986
- Seth Elledge 2016
- Jacoby Ellsbury 2004
- Kent Emanuel 2011
- Chris Enochs 1996
- Darin Erstad 1993–1994
- Luke Farrell 2012
- Durbin Feltman 2017
- Brandon Finnegan 2013
- Steve Fireovid 1977
- Jeff Fischer 1984
- Red Flaherty 1936
- Mike Flanagan 1972
- Marv Foley 1974
- Horace "Hod" Ford 1915–1916
- Tony Fossas 1978
- Christian Friedrich 2007
- Rich Gale 1974
- Ian Gardeck 2011
- Grayson Garvin 2009
- Chippy Gaw 1926
- Kyle Gibson 2007
- Russ Gibson 1957
- Casey Gillaspie 2013
- Conor Gillaspie 2007
- Brandon Gomes 2003, 2006
- Marco Gonzales 2012
- Tom Grant 1977
- Tristan Gray 2015–2016
- Stephen Greenberg 1967–1969
- Khalil Greene 1999–2000
- Cadyn Grenier 2016
- Lee Gronkiewicz 1999
- Matt Hague 2007
- Matt Hall 2014
- Caleb Hamilton 2015
- Mark Hamilton 2004–2005
- Maverick Handley 2018
- Josh Hartle 2022
- Kris Harvey 2004
- Andrew Heaney 2011
- Brian Herosian 1971–1972
- Ben Hess 2022
- Aldro Hibbard 1911, 1913, 1915–1916
- Tyler Holton 2016
- Rhys Hoskins 2013
- Mike Huff 1984
- Chad Huffman 2005
- Gary Hymel 1989
- Logan Ice 2015
- Steven Jackson 2001–2002
- Walker Janek 2023
- Travis Janssen 1995
- Bryce Johnson 2016
- Tim Jorgensen 1994
- Caleb Joseph 2007
- Edouard Julien 2018
- Nate Karns 2008
- Adam Kennedy 1996
- Spencer Kieboom 2011
- Gavin Kilen 2023–2024
- Mike Kinkade 1994
- Dennis Konuszewski 1991
- Eddie Kunz 2006
- B. J. LaMura 2000–2001
- Trevor Larnach 2016–2017
- Preston Larrison 2000
- Jace LaViolette 2023
- Corey Lee 1995–1996
- Derek Lee 1986
- Wilfred "Lefty" Lefebvre 1935
- Ryan Lefebvre 1992
- Chris Leroux 2004
- Jensen Lewis 2003–2004
- Richie Lewis 1986
- Jack Little 2018
- Steve Lombardozzi 1978–1980
- Javier López 1997
- Mark Loretta 1991–1992
- Aaron Loup 2008
- Fletcher Low 1914
- Cory Luebke 2006
- Tyler Lumsden 2002
- Scott Lusader 1985
- Danny "Deacon" MacFayden 1925
- Waddy MacPhee 1929–1930
- Ever Magallanes 1986
- Val Majewski 2001
- Mike Maksudian 1987
- Nick Maronde 2010
- Corbin Martin 2016
- Richie Martin 2013
- Nick Martinez 2011
- Tino Martinez 1986
- Nick Martini 2010
- J. J. Matijevic 2015–2016
- James McArthur 2017
- Jud McLaughlin 1935
- John Means 2013
- Jim Mecir 1990
- Sam Militello 1989
- Bryce Miller 2019
- Justin Miller 2008
- Eric Milton 1995–1996
- Pat Misch 2001–2002
- Paul Mitchell 1969–1971
- Carmen Mlodzinski 2019
- Billy Mohl 2003
- Bryce Montes de Oca 2015
- Dave Morey 1918–1921
- Hunter Morris 2009
- Joe Mulligan 1936
- Nick Nastrini 2019
- John Nelson 1998
- Matheu Nelson 2019
- Hal Neubauer 1923
- Kevin Newman 2013–2014
- Al Niemiec 1931
- Curly Oden 1926–1928
- Adam Oller 2015
- Jim Paciorek 1980
- Joe Paterson 2006
- Cliff Pennington 2004
- David Phelps 2007
- Andrew Pinckney 2022
- Jim Ploeger 2013
- A. J. Pollock 2008
- Tommy Raffo 1988
- Jorge Reyes 2008
- Jim Riggleman 1972–1973
- Cory Riordan 2006
- Harry J. Robertson 1914–1915
- Jim Robertson 1914–1915
- Zion Rose 2024
- Steve Rosenberg 1985
- Emil "Bud" Roy 1933
- Darin Ruf 2008
- Scott Ruskin 1983
- Adley Rutschman 2017
- Rosy Ryan 1937–1938
- Cole Sands 2016–2017
- Gary Scott 1988
- Luke Scott 2000f
- Troy Scribner 2012
- Todd Sears 1996
- Rob Segedin 2008
- Jon Shave 1989
- T. J. Sikkema 2018
- Brady Singer 2016
- Vince Sinisi 2002
- Brett Sinkbeil 2005
- Matt Skole 2009–2010
- Evan Skoug 2015
- DeAndre Smelter 2011
- Scott Sobkowiak 1997
- Drew Sommers 2022
- Lary Sorensen 1975
- Vasili Spanos 2002
- Carson Spiers 2018
- John Spirida 1938
- Bill Stewart 1929
- Matt Stites 2010
- Kyle Stowers 2018
- Doug Strange 1984
- Scott Strickland 1996
- Spencer Strider 2018
- Andrew Susac 2010
- Kevin Tapani 1985
- Tim Tawa 2019
- Brayden Taylor 2021–2022
- Nick Tepesch 2008–2009
- Ray Tift 1914
- Ozzie Timmons 1990
- Chris Tracz 2002–2003
- Pie Traynor 1919
- Mike Trombley 1988
- George Tsamis 1986–1988
- John Tudor 1975
- Gavin Turley 2023
- Cory Vance 1998–1999
- Brett Wallace 2006
- Matt Wallner 2018
- Allen Watson 1990
- Juaron Watts-Brown 2022
- Jeff Weaver 1997
- Kyle Weiland 2007
- Turk Wendell 1987
- Ben Wetzler 2012
- Ed Whited 1984
- Walt Whittaker 1914–1915
- Alex Wilson 2007–2008
- Kris Wilson 1995–1996
- Scott Winchester 1994
- Joey Wong 2007–2008
- Gage Wood 2024
- Justin Wrobleski 2019
- Alex Young 2014
- Ryan Zeferjahn 2017

== Yearly results ==
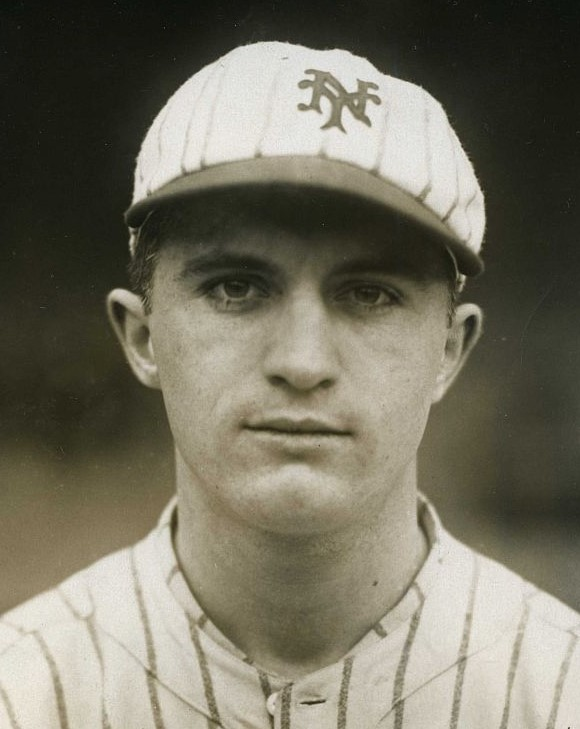
Waddy MacPhee, shortstop for Falmouth's 1929 title club

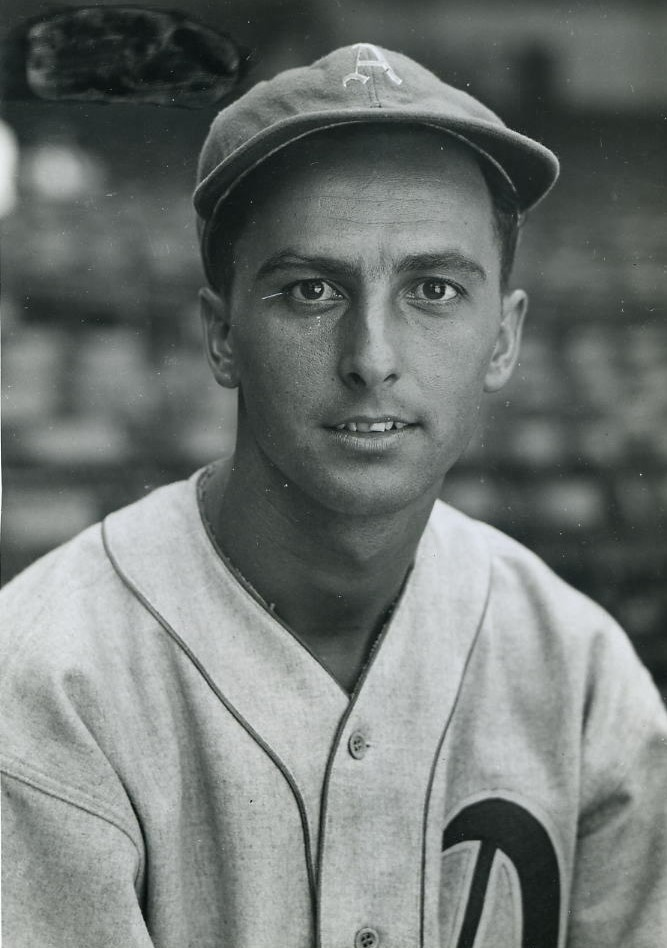
Al Niemiec of Falmouth's 1931 title club

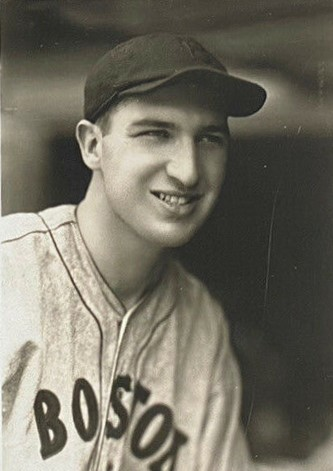
Joe Mulligan pitched for Falmouth in 1936.

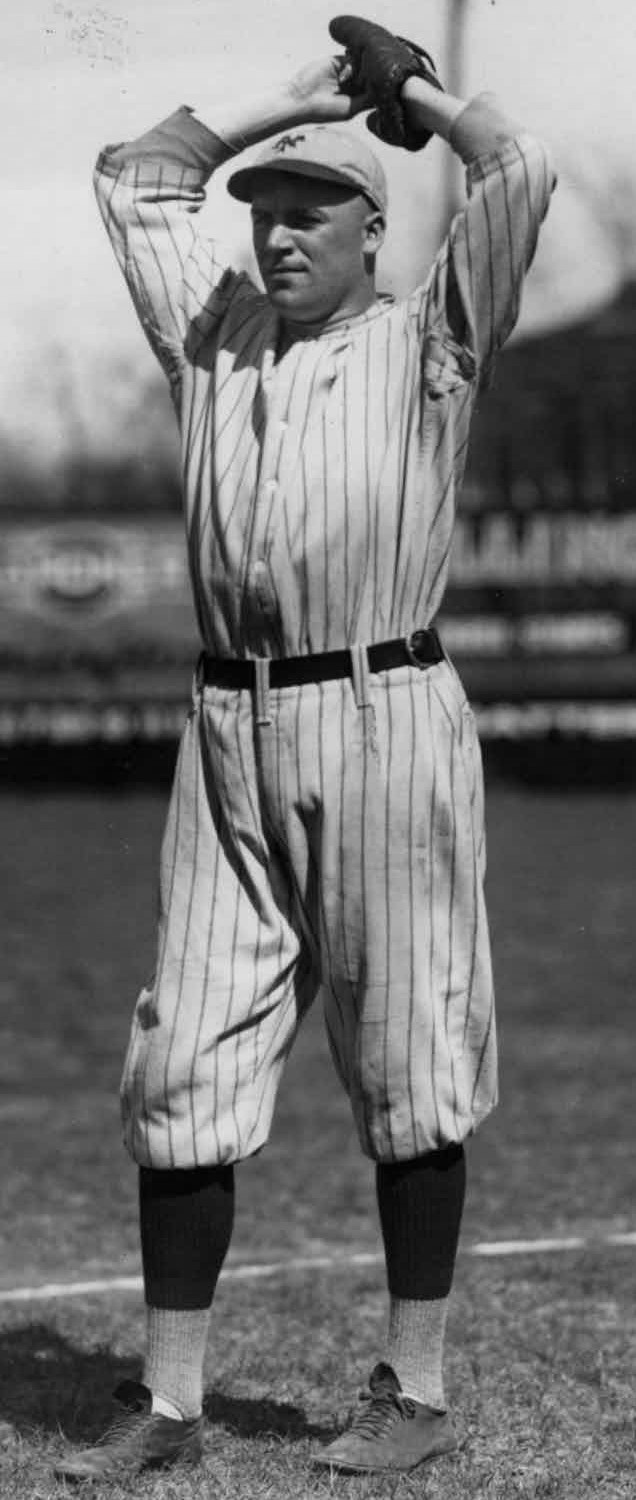
Former major leaguer Rosy Ryan was the star on the mound in Falmouth's 1938 title season

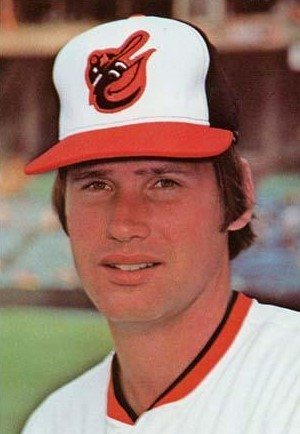
CCBL Hall of Famer Paul Mitchell won three consecutive league titles with Falmouth from 1969 to '71, setting a league record with 126 strikeouts in 1969.

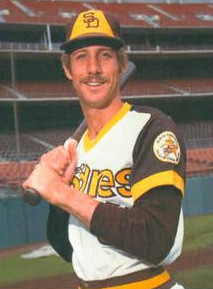
Bill Almon of the 1972 & 1973 Commodores was selected first overall in the 1974 MLB draft.

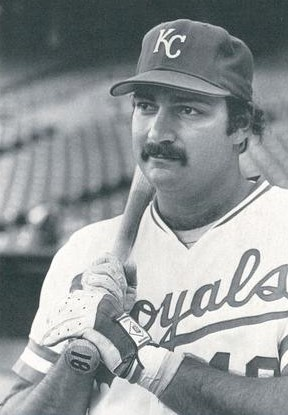
CCBL Hall of Famer Steve Balboni played for Falmouth in 1976

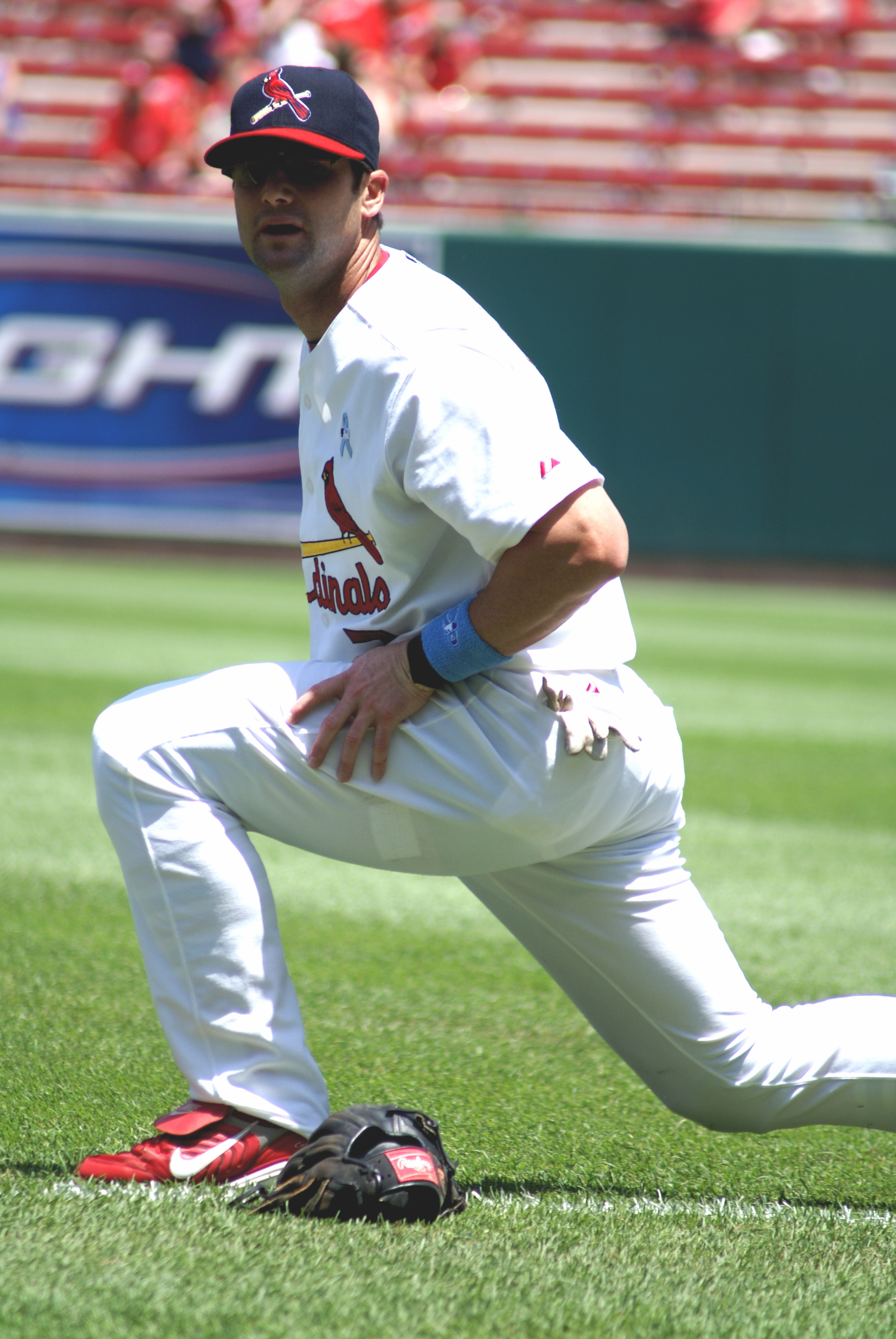
1996 Falmouth Commodore Adam Kennedy

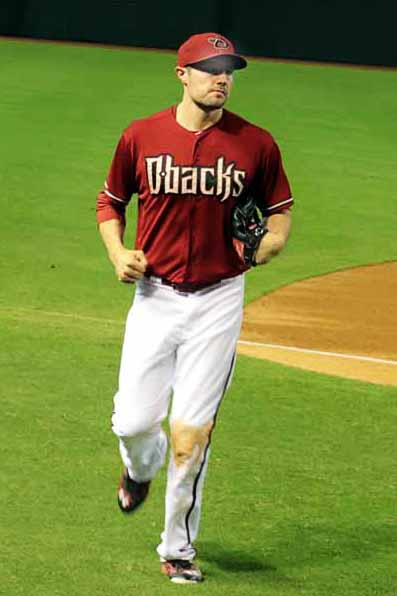
The Commodores' A. J. Pollock was CCBL league MVP in 2008

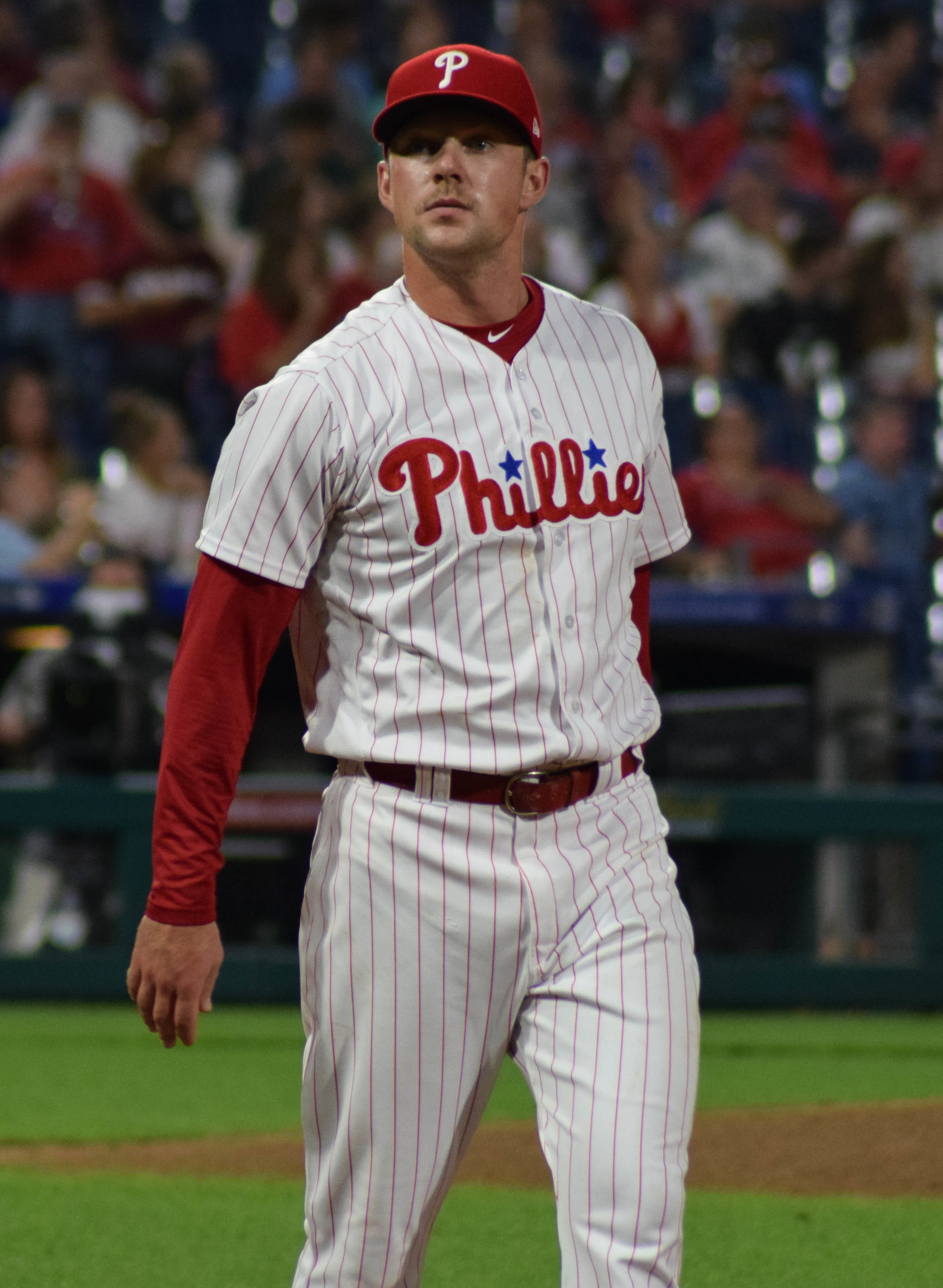
Rhys Hoskins, 2013 'Dores

=== Results by season, 1923–1939 ===
Year	Won	Lost	Regular Season Finish	Postseason*	Manager	Ref
1923	9	3	1st League	Won championship	Byron H. Parker; Frank Silva	
1924	9	15	3rd League		L.P. Jones; Harry B. Albro	
1925	10	10	2nd League		Arthur "Dutch" Ayer	
1926	22	19	3rd League		Chippy Gaw	
1927	20	17	2nd League		Curly Oden	
1928	21	23	4th League		Curly Oden	
1929	25	19	1st League	Won championship	Linn Wells	
1930	25	19	4th League		Linn Wells; Asa Small	
1931	34	16	1st League	Won championship	Jack Walsh	
1932	23	11	1st League	Won championship	Jack Walsh	
1933	31	19	1st League (A); 3rd League (B)	Lost championship (Harwich)	Jack Walsh	
1934	25	23	2nd League		Jack Walsh	
1935	30	17	2nd League (A); 1st League (B)	Won championship (Barnstable)	Jack Walsh	
1936	24	24	2nd League (A); 2nd League (B)		Jack Walsh	
1937	23	23	4th League		Bill Boehner	
1938	32	22	1st League	Won championship	Bill Boehner	
1939	33	20	1st League (A); 1st League (B)	Won championship	Buzz Harvey	

* During the CCBL's 1923–1939 era, postseason playoffs were a rarity. In most years, the regular season pennant winner was simply crowned as the league champion.
However, there were four years in which the league split its regular season and crowned separate champions for the first (A) and second (B) halves. In two of those
seasons (1936 and 1939), a single team won both halves and was declared overall champion. In the other two split seasons (1933 and 1935), a postseason
playoff series was contested between the two half-season champions to determine the overall champion.

=== Results by season, 1946–1962 ===
Falmouth All-Stars
Year	Won	Lost	Regular Season Finish*	Postseason	Manager	Ref
1946	10	2	1st Upper Cape Division (A); 1st Upper Cape Division (B)	Won semi-finals (Sagamore); Won championship (Harwich)	John DeMello	
1947	12	11	4th Upper Cape Division (A); 2nd Upper Cape Division (B)		John DeMello	
1948	24	4	1st Upper Cape Division (A); 2nd Upper Cape Division (B)	Lost semi-finals (Mashpee)	John DeMello	
1949	24	11	1st Upper Cape Division (A); 4th Upper Cape Division (B)	Won semi-finals (Cotuit); Lost championship (Orleans)	Willard E. Boyden	
1950	20	12	3rd Upper Cape Division (A); T-3rd Upper Cape Division (B)		Willard E. Boyden	
1951	14	22	3rd Upper Cape Division (A); 7th Upper Cape Division (B)		Willard E. Boyden	
1952	8	24	6th Upper Cape Division (A); 6th Upper Cape Division (B)		Willard E. Boyden; Marshall Douthart	
1953	14	22	6th Upper Cape Division (A); 5th Upper Cape Division (B)		Willard E. Boyden	
1954	12	18	3rd Upper Cape Division (A); 4th Upper Cape Division (B)		Jack Cavanaugh	
1955	14	25	6th Upper Cape Division (A); 5th Upper Cape Division (B)		Jack Cavanaugh	
1956	8	24	6th Upper Cape Division		Tony Cunha	
1957	9	21	6th Upper Cape Division		Joe Allietta	
1958	8	14	5th Upper Cape Division (A); 4th Upper Cape Division (B)		Tony Cunha	
1959	13	19	4th Upper Cape Division (A); 6th Upper Cape Division (B)		Joseph Parent, Jr.	
1960	22	4	1st Upper Cape Division	Lost round 1 (Sagamore)	Tony Cunha	
1961	18	12	3rd Upper Cape Division (T)	Won round 1 (Sagamore); Lost semi-finals (Cotuit)	Tony Cunha	
1962	11	19	5th Upper Cape Division		Tony Cunha	

Falmouth Falcons (1951–1953)
Year	Won	Lost	Regular Season Finish*	Postseason	Manager	Ref
1951	18	16	2nd Upper Cape Division (A); 6th Upper Cape Division (B)		Charlie "Wig" Robb	
1952					Charlie Borden	
1953	11	25	7th Upper Cape Division (A); 6th Upper Cape Division (B)		Phil White	

* Regular seasons split into first and second halves are designated as (A) and (B).

=== Results by season, 1963–present ===
Year	Won	Lost	Tied	Regular Season Finish	Postseason	Manager
1963	12	21	0	4th Upper Cape Division		Don Prohovich
1964	12	21	0	4th Upper Cape Division		Charles Hitchcock
1965	17	15	0	2nd Upper Cape Division		Bill Livesey
1966	20	14	0	1st Upper Cape Division	Won championship (Chatham)	Bill Livesey
1967	28	12	0	1st Upper Cape Division	Won semi-finals (Cotuit); Lost championship (Chatham)	Bill Livesey
1968	26	14	0	1st Upper Cape Division	Won championship (Harwich)	Bill Livesey
1969	26	18	0	1st Upper Cape Division	Won semi-finals (Cotuit); Won championship (Chatham)	Bill Livesey
1970	25	16	0	1st League (T)	Won semi-finals (Cotuit); Won championship (Orleans)	Bill Livesey
1971	30	12	0	1st League	Won semi-finals (Cotuit); Won championship (Orleans)	Bill Livesey
1972	26	15	1	1st League (T)	Lost semi-finals (Cotuit)	Bill Livesey
1973	16	24	2	6th League		Andy Baylock
1974	17	22	3	6th League		Andy Baylock
1975	26	16	0	1st League	Won semi-finals (Yarmouth); Lost championship (Cotuit)	Jack Gillis
1976	13	27	1	7th League		Jack Gillis
1977	5	16	1	8th League		Dan Gooley
1978	18	24	0	7th League		Steve Steitz
1979	18	23	0	5th League		Andy Baylock
1980	26	15	1	2nd League	Won semi-finals (Cotuit); Won championship (Chatham)	Al Worthington
1981	17	25	0	7th League		Jack Leggett
1982	14	25	1	8th League		Jeff Albies
1983	11	29	1	8th League		Bob Allietta
1984	20	19	3	5th League		Ed Lyons
1985	13	29	0	8th League		Jim Frye
1986	19	20	2	5th League		Ed Cardieri
1987	11	30	0	8th League		Ed Cardieri
1988	18	21	0	4th West Division		Bill Lagos
1989	18	26	0	5th West Division		Rich Piergustavo
1990	17	26	1	5th West Division		Rich Piergustavo
1991	19	25	0	5th West Division		Dan O'Brien
1992	18	23	2	4th West Division		Arthur "Ace" Adams
1993	22	21	0	4th West Division		Arthur "Ace" Adams
1994	26	16	1	1st West Division	Lost semi-finals (Wareham)	Harvey Shapiro
1995	16	26	1	4th West Division		Harvey Shapiro
1996	26	17	0	2nd West Division	Won semi-finals (Wareham); Lost championship (Chatham)	Harvey Shapiro
1997	24	20	0	3rd West Division		Harvey Shapiro
1998	20	24	0	4th West Division		Harvey Shapiro
1999	12	32	0	5th West Division		Jeff Trundy
2000	21	23	0	3rd West Division		Jeff Trundy
2001	23	19	2	3rd West Division		Jeff Trundy
2002	20	21	3	3rd West Division		Jeff Trundy
2003	16	26	1	5th West Division		Jeff Trundy
2004	25	18	1	1st West Division	Won semi-finals (Hyannis); Lost championship (Y-D)	Jeff Trundy
2005	22	21	1	3rd West Division		Jeff Trundy
2006	22	21	1	3rd West Division		Jeff Trundy
2007	22	22	0	2nd West Division	Won semi-finals (Bourne); Lost championship (Y-D)	Jeff Trundy
2008	23	20	1	2nd West Division (T)	Won play-in game (Bourne); Lost semi-finals (Cotuit)	Jeff Trundy
2009	17	24	2	4th West Division		Jeff Trundy
2010	21	22	1	2nd West Division	Lost round 1 (Cotuit)	Jeff Trundy
2011	19	25	0	1st West Division	Won round 1 (Hyannis); Won semi-finals (Wareham); Lost championship (Harwich)	Jeff Trundy
2012	21	23	0	2nd West Division (T)	Lost round 1 (Wareham)	Jeff Trundy
2013	26	18	0	1st West Division (T)	Lost round 1 (Cotuit)	Jeff Trundy
2014	26	17	1	2nd West Division	Won round 1 (Hyannis); Won semi-finals (Cotuit); Lost championship (Y-D)	Jeff Trundy
2015	16	27	1	5th West Division		Jeff Trundy
2016	29	15	0	1st West Division	Won round 1 (Hyannis); Won semi-finals (Bourne); Lost championship (Y-D)	Jeff Trundy
2017	24	19	1	1st West Division	Lost round 1 (Wareham)	Jeff Trundy
2018	24	19	1	3rd West Division	Won round 1 (Hyannis); Lost semi-finals (Wareham)	Jeff Trundy
2019	27	15	2	1st West Division	Won round 1 (Bourne); Lost semi-finals (Cotuit)	Jeff Trundy
2020	Season cancelled due to coronavirus pandemic					
2021	14	19	2	4th West Division		Jeff Trundy
2022	19	21	4	4th West Division	Lost round 1 (Bourne)	Jeff Trundy
2023	24	18	2	3rd West Division	Lost round 1 (Hyannis)	Jeff Trundy
2024	16	23	1	5th West Division		Jeff Trundy
2025	16	23	1	5th West Division		Jarrod Saltalamacchia
2026	17	21	2	3rd West Division	Lost round 1 (Bourne)	Jack Dahm

== League award winners ==
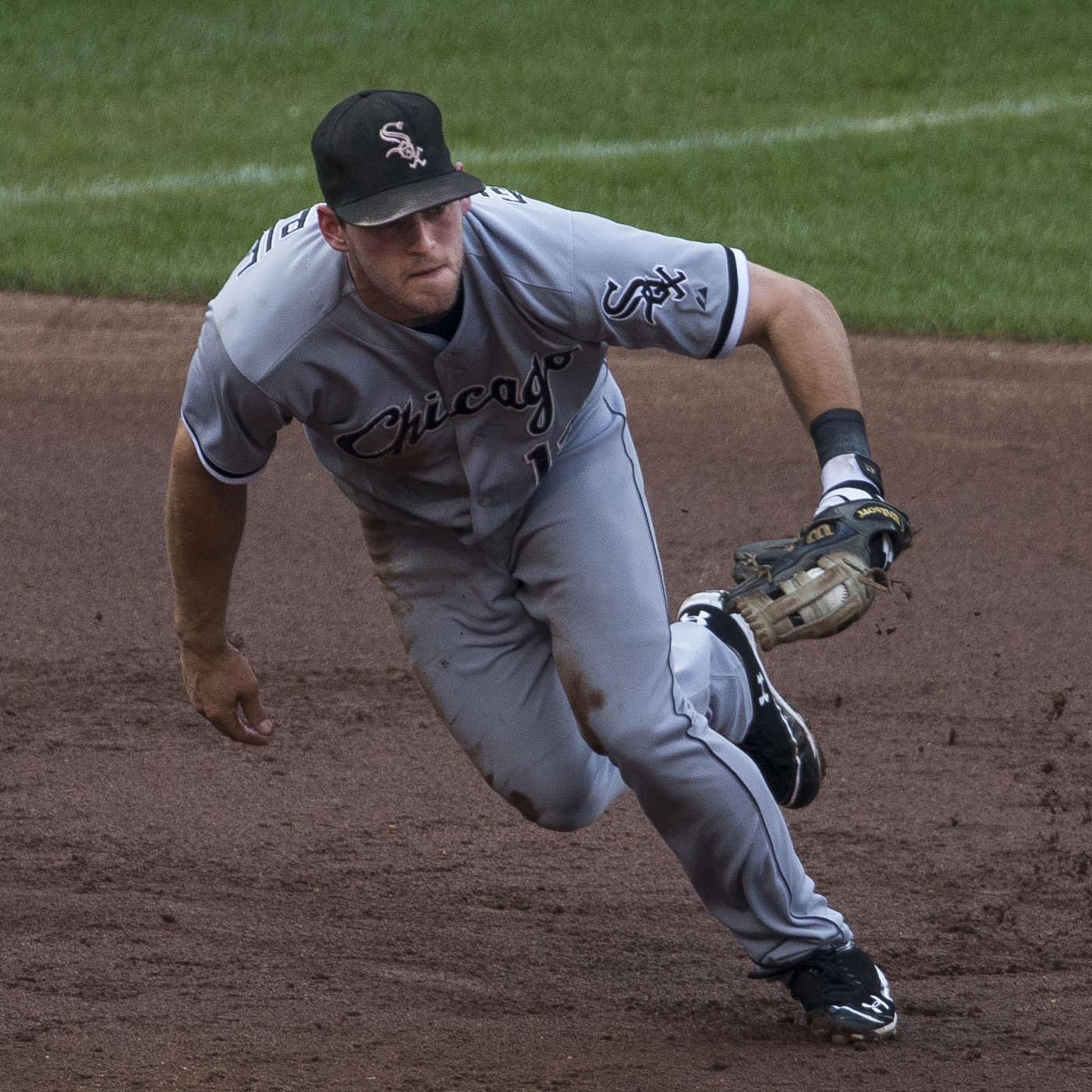
CCBL Hall of Famer and 2007 MVP Conor Gillaspie

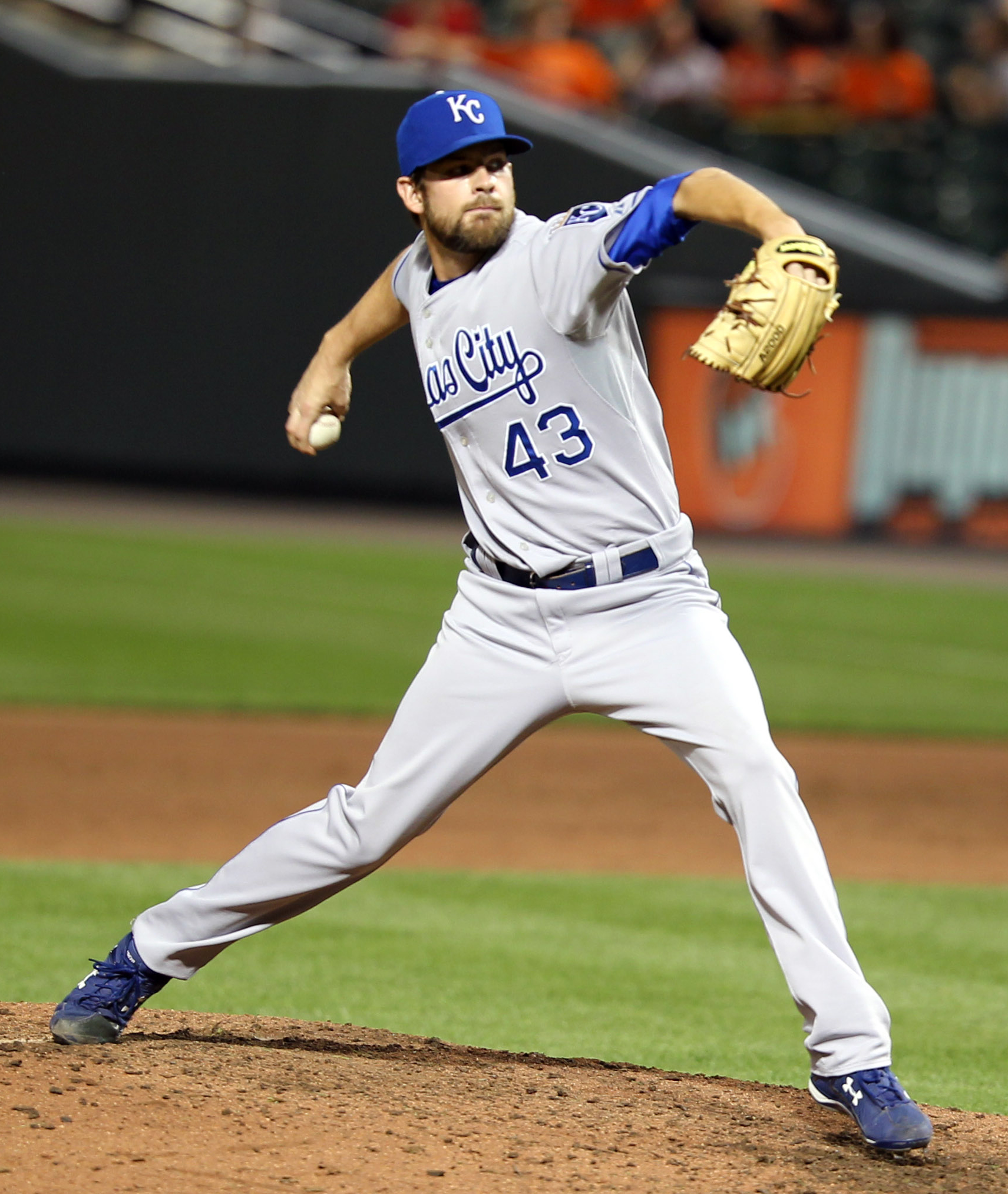
Commodore Aaron Crow was the CCBL Outstanding Pro Prospect in 2007

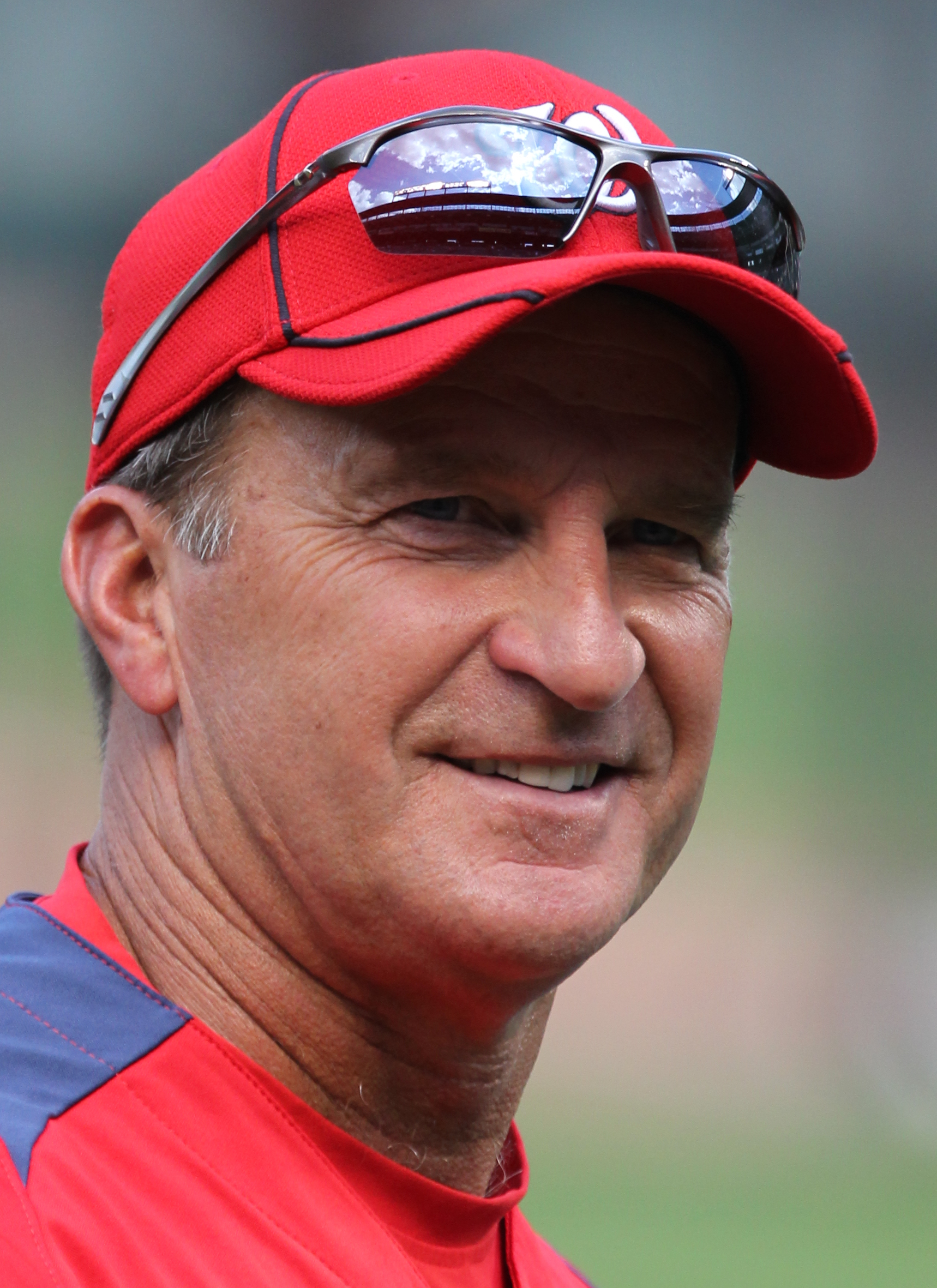
Falmouth's Jim Riggleman was 1973 CCBL All-Star Game MVP

The Pat Sorenti MVP Award
Year	Player
1994	Darin Erstad
2004	Daniel Carte
2007	Conor Gillaspie
2008	A.J. Pollock
2014	Kevin Newman
2023	Travis Bazzana
2025	Maika Niu

The Robert A. McNeece Outstanding Pro Prospect Award
Year	Player
2000	Bob Brownlie
2007	Aaron Crow
2009	Todd Cunningham
2016	Michael Gigliotti

The BFC Whitehouse Outstanding Pitcher Award
Year	Player
1969	Paul Mitchell
1970	Paul Mitchell
1994	Bob St. Pierre
2005	Tim Norton*
2016	Jeff Passantino
2018	Adam Laskey

The Russ Ford Outstanding Relief Pitcher Award
Year	Player
1993	Don Nestor
1994	Scott Winchester
2019	Zach Brzykcy

The Daniel J. Silva Sportsmanship Award
Year	Player
1978	Gary Cicatiello*
1980	Steve Lombardozzi*
1991	Craig Mayes
1995	Scott Steinmann
1996	Andre Champagne
2017	Josh Breaux
2018	Maverick Handley

The Manny Robello 10th Player Award
Year	Player
1992	Steve Hirschman
2004	Cliff Pennington
2006	Andrew Walker
2017	Marty Bechina
2019	Austin Masel

The John J. Claffey Outstanding New England Player Award
Year	Player
2005	Tim Norton
2011	Nate Koneski
2023	Tyler MacGregor

The Thurman Munson Award for Batting Champion
Year	Player
1972	Ed Orrizzi (.372)
1981	Sam Nattile (.443)
1984	Jim McCollom (.413)
2007	Conor Gillaspie (.345)
2008	Jimmy Cesario (.387)
2009	Todd Cunningham (.378)
2013	Kevin Newman (.375)
2014	Kevin Newman (.385)
2019	Zach DeLoach (.353)
2023	Travis Bazzana (.375)

All-Star Game MVP Award
Year	Player
1973	Jim Riggleman
1997	Jason Edgar
2004	Dallas Buck
2006	Brad Chalk
2007	Aaron Crow
2013	Kevin Cron
2025	Antonio Morales

All-Star Home Run Hitting Contest Champion
Year	Player
1999	Doc Brooks

The Star of Stars Playoff MVP Award
Year	Player

(*) - Indicates co-recipient

== All-Star Game selections ==
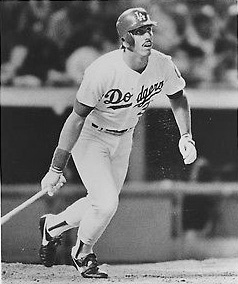
Sid Bream was an all-star for the 1980 CCBL champion Commodores.

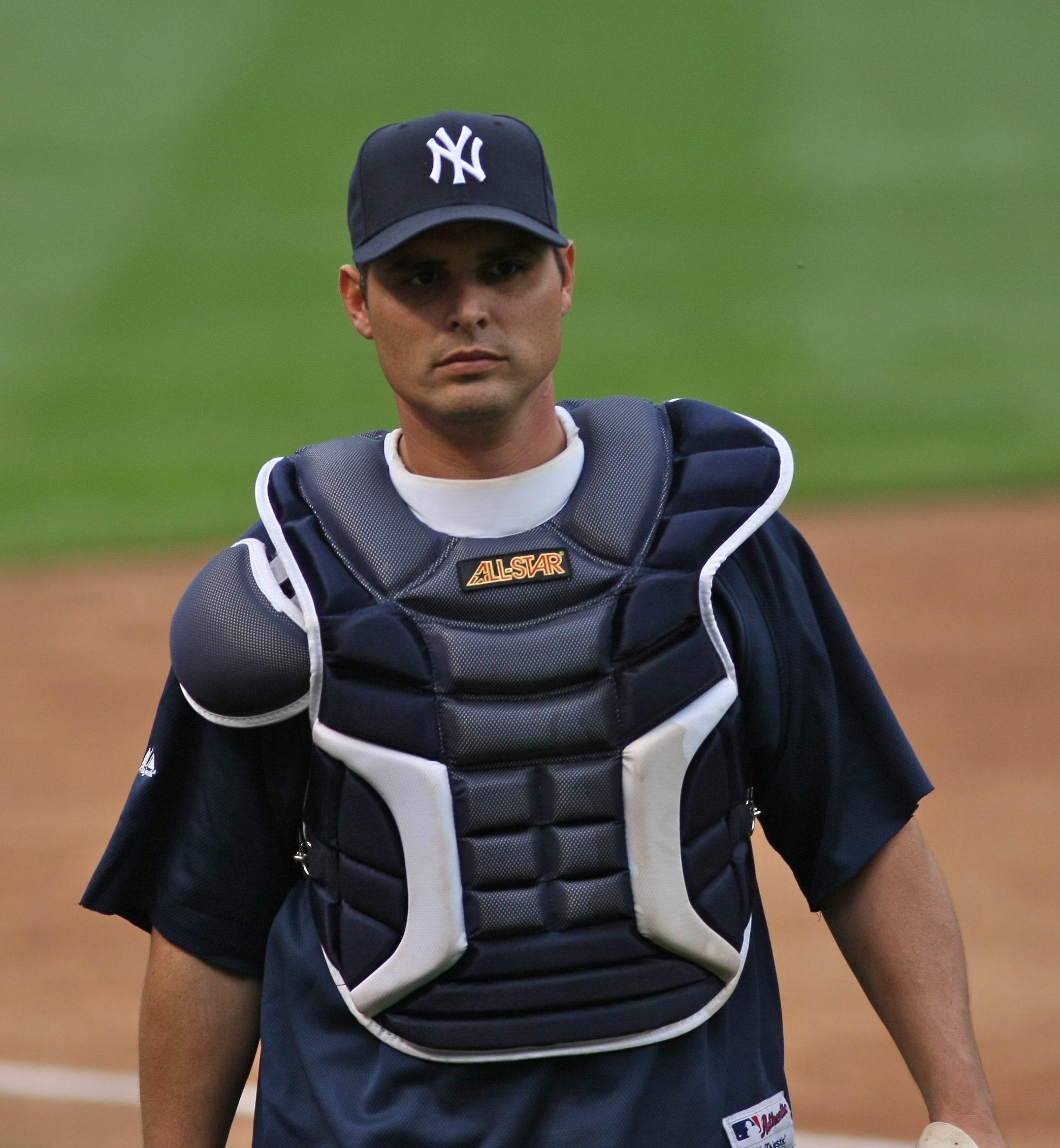
1999 Commodores all-star Kevin Cash

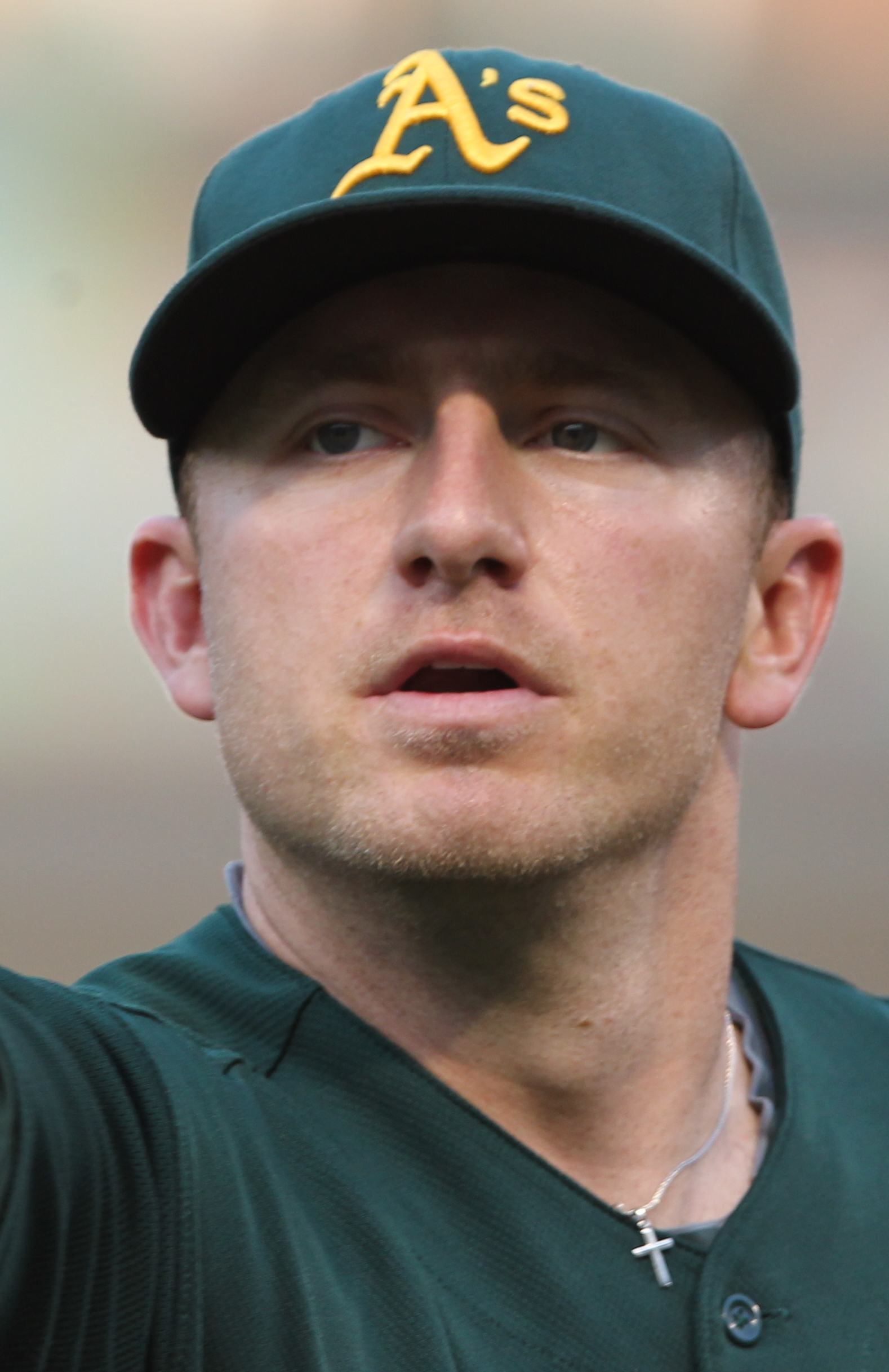
CCBL Hall of Famer Cliff Pennington, 2004 Falmouth all-star

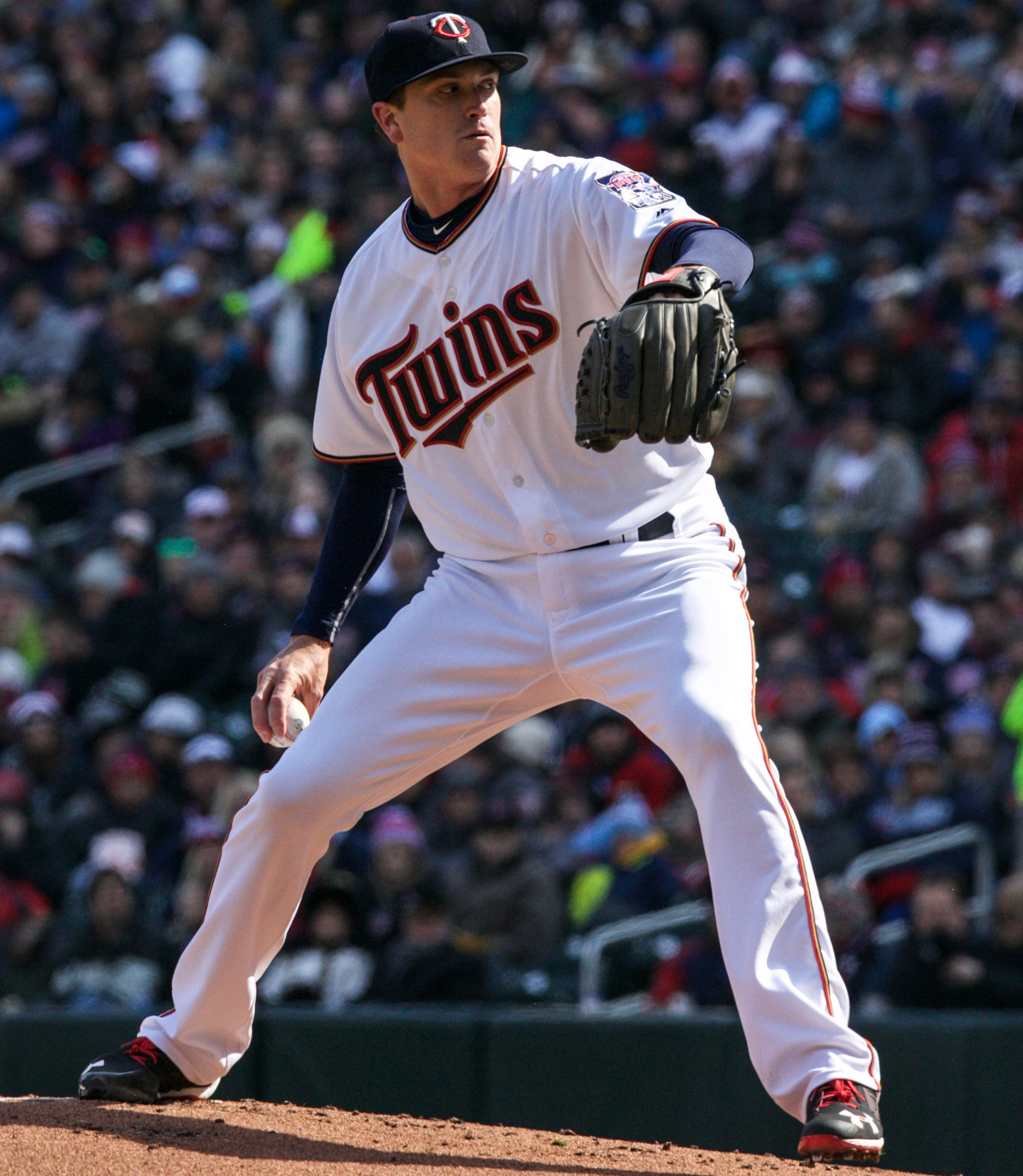
2007 Commodores all-star Kyle Gibson

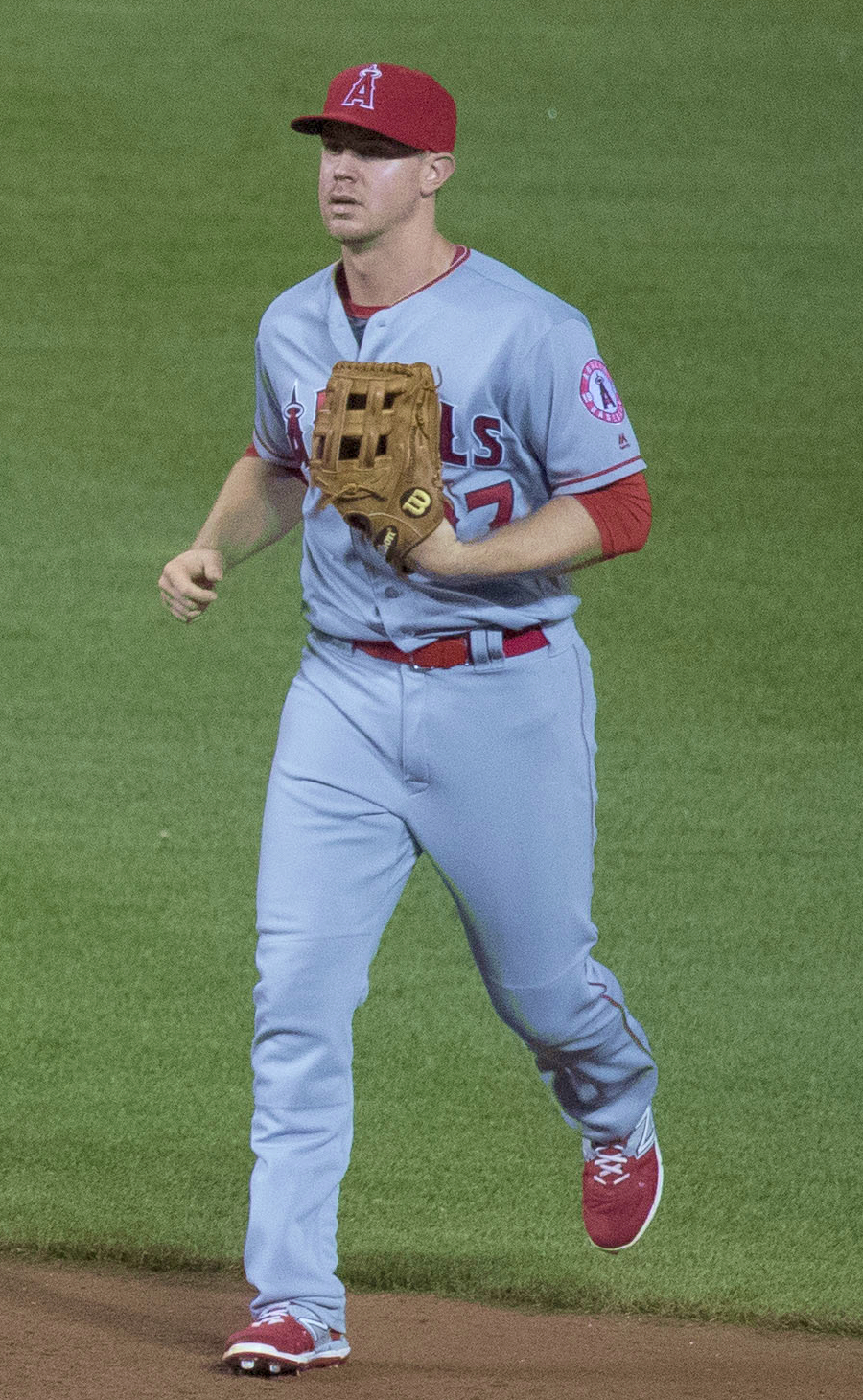
2009 all-star and CCBL Hall of Famer Todd Cunningham was the league's batting champ and Outstanding Pro Prospect

Year	Players	Ref
1963	John Souza	
1964	Bud Knittel, Pete Haigis	
1965	Mike Finnell, Robert Hall, Malcolm Beard, Richard DeVarney, Steve Kadison	
1966	Mike Finnell, Dave Lapointe, Rick Aldrich, Len Sheflott, Noel Kinski, Art DiMartino	
1967	Dave Lapointe, Don Picard, Gary Sargent, John Hefferon, George Ferguson, Mike Kapsimalis, Carter Lord	
1968	Dave Lapointe, Mike Finnell, Pat Bourque, Dan Stewart, Dave Baye, Dave Stone, Ed McFarland	
1969	Paul Mitchell, Steve Greenberg, Terry Wedgewood, Ray Huard, Dean Hoag, Mickey Karkut	
1970	Paul Mitchell, Jim Jachym	
1971	Paul Mitchell, Russ Peach, Kevin Bryant, Brian Herosian	
1972	(Team)*	
1973	Bill Almon, Jim Riggleman, Arthur "Ace" Adams	
1974	Rich Gale, Marv Foley, Bob Gillis	
1975	Bill Evers, Bill Tullish, Stan Saleski	
1976	(None)	
1977	(None)	
1978	Tom Olszak	
1979	Billy Best, Marty Pulley	
1980	Sid Bream, Steve Lombardozzi, Mark Winters	
1981	Dennis Glynn, Sam Matillo, Tom Reynolds	
1982	Bill Mendek	
1983	Bob Posey	
1984	Doug Fisher, Deric Ladnier, Jim McCollom	
1985	Doug Fisher, Steve Rosenberg	
1986	Tino Martinez, Ed Rush, Richie Lewis	
1987	(None)	
1988	Bob McCreary, George Tsamis, Tom Hickox, Jim Jimacki, John Farrell	
1989	Jon Shave, Mike Weimerskirch, Sam Militello	
1990	Bob Langer, Tim Hickox	
1991	Bob Juday, Craig Mayes, Scott Gentile	
1992	Mark Loretta, Ryan Lefebvre, Pat Schulz	
1993	Mike Martin, Jason Garman, Don Nestor, Darin Erstad	
1994	Brian Cummins, Bob St. Pierre, Mike Kinkade, Darin Erstad, Scott Winchester	
1995	Scott Byers, Kris Wilson	
1996	Mark Fischer, Gary Burnham, Chuck Crowder, Eric Milton, Rob Hauswald	
1997	Jeff Weaver, Jason Edgar, Brian Smith, Brian Ralph, Chad Sutter	
1998	Scott Bikowski, Russ Jacobson, Vance Cozier	
1999	Kevin Cash, Doc Brooks	
2000	Dave Mattle, Bob Brownlie, Vince Serafini, Doc Brooks, Luke Scott	
2001	Hunter Brown, Val Majewski, Jarrod Schmidt, Steve Herce	
2002	Vasili Spanos, Devin Ivany, Jon Kaplan, David Aardsma	
2003	Darryl Lawhorn, Billy Mohl, Collin Mahoney, Joey Metropoulos	
2004	Matt Antonelli, Dallas Buck, Cliff Pennington, Daniel Carte, Danny Perales, Phil Bartleski, Jensen Lewis, Mark Hamilton	
2005	Matt Antonelli, Dallas Buck, Jon Still, Mark Hamilton, Brett Sinkbeil, Tim Norton	
2006	Mitch Canham, Brad Chalk, Brett Wallace, Warren McFadden, David Kopp, Sam Demel, Eddie Kunz	
2007	Conor Gillaspie, Aja Barto, Matt Hague, Aaron Crow, Kyle Gibson, Christian Friedrich, Luke Burnett	
2008	Trevor Coleman, Jimmy Cesario, A.J. Pollock, Ben Tootle	
2009	B.A. Vollmuth, Todd Cunningham, Brian Fletcher, Patrick Cooper, Taylor Wall, Hunter Morris	
2010	Andrew Susac, Kevin Medrano, KC Serna, Christian Jones	
2011	Jake Rodriguez, Jeremy Baltz, John Simms	
2012	Drew Dosch, Trey Masek	
2013	Kevin Newman, Kevin Cron, Leon Byrd, Rhys Hoskins, Dylan Davis, Brandon Magallones, Casey Gillaspie	
2014	Kevin Newman, Jake Madsen, Connor Hale, Matt Eureste, Steven Duggar, Cameron O’Brien, Matt Hall, Matt Eckelman, Alex Young	
2015	J. J. Matijevic, Heath Quinn, Austin Tribby, Andrew Frankenreider	
2016	Michael Gigliotti, Tyler Lawrence, Jeffrey Passantino, Tristan Gray, Trevor Larnach, Brady Puckett, Brendan King	
2017	Alec Bohm, Clayton Daniel, George Janca, Kyle Bradish, Mitchell Miller, Marty Bechina	
2018	Matt Canterino, Kyle Stowers, Steven Williams, Cameron Cannon, T. J. Sikkema, Ian Koch	
2019	Trei Cruz, Hayden Cantrelle, Zach DeLoach, Franco Alemán, Logan Hofmann, Barron Radcliff	
2020	Season cancelled due to coronavirus pandemic	
2021	Brayden Taylor, Jace Bohrofen, Lucas Gordon, Chase Jeter	
2022	Joey Ryan, Colby Halter, Andrew Pinckney, Alex Mooney, Philip Abner	
2023	Joey Ryan, Travis Bazzana, Garrett Coe, Gavin Kilen, Kade Snell	
2024	Karson Bowen, Parker Coil, Jayson Jones, Jaxon Willits, Trent Caraway	
2025	Trever Baumler, Adrian Lopez, Antonio Morales, Joe Sabbath, Carl Schmidt, Kent Schmidt, Jakob Schulz, Maika Niu	
2026	Kenyon Collins, Riley Jackson, Ty Kaunus, Austin Mallee, Fabio Peralta, Ben Slanker	

(*) Due to a scheduling conflict with the ACBL, the 1972 All-Star Game was contested between the CCBL all-stars and the defending league champion Commodores team.

Italics - Indicates All-Star Game Home Run Hitting Contest participant (1988 to present)

== No-hit games ==
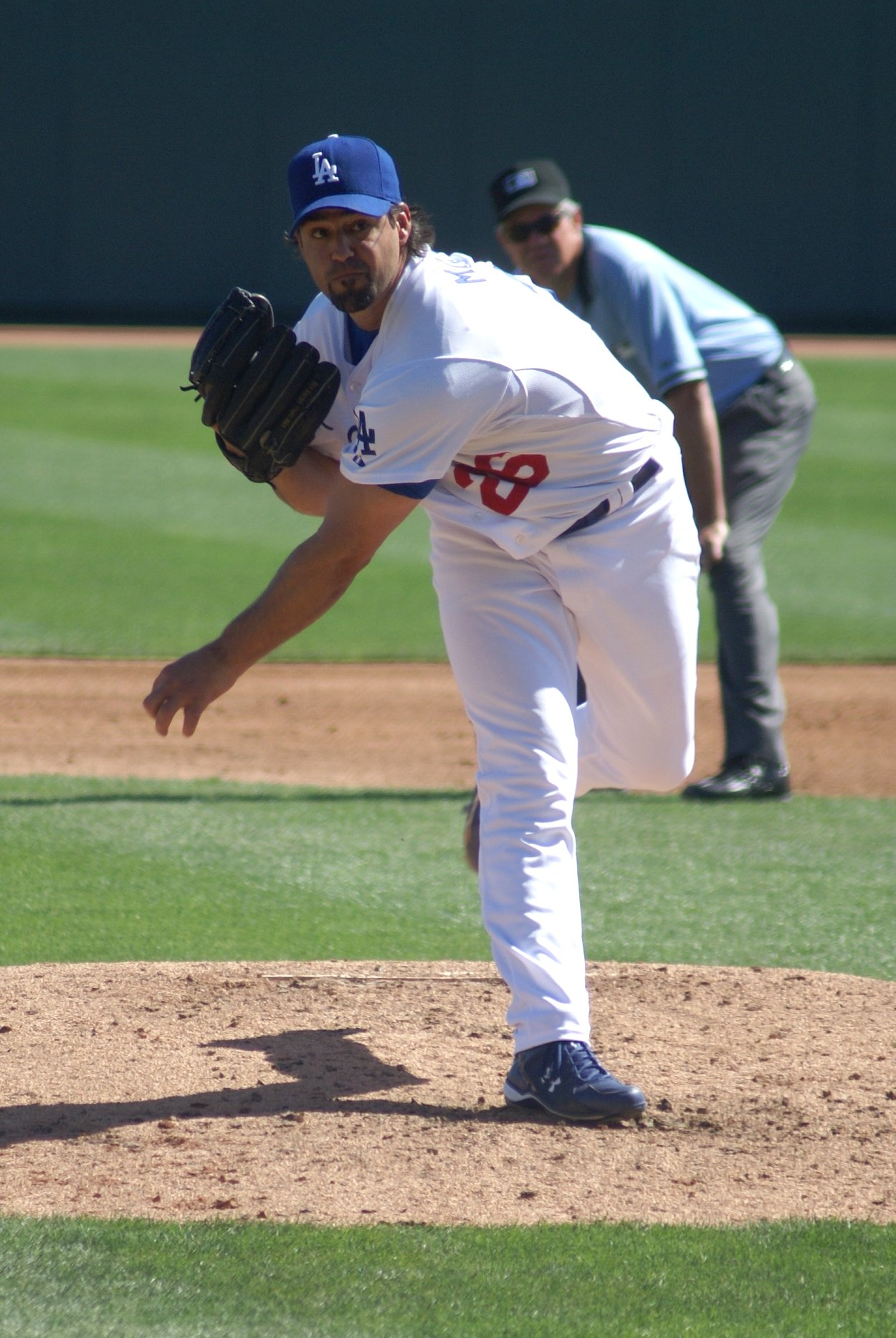
CCBL Hall of Famer Eric Milton posted a 0.21 ERA and tossed a no-hitter for Falmouth in 1996.

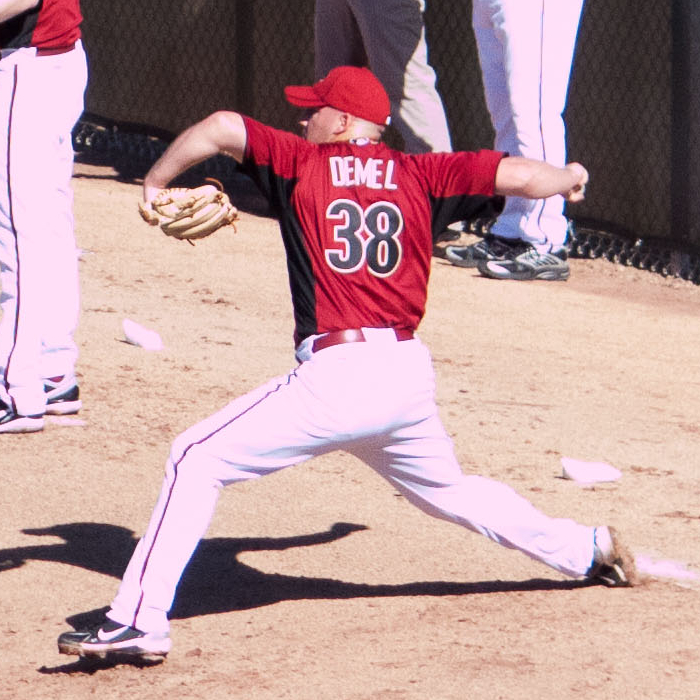
Sam Demel tossed part of a combined no-hitter for the Commodores in 2006.

Year	Pitcher	Opponent	Score	Location	Notes	Ref
1915	Walt Whittaker	Oak Bluffs	6–0	Central Park Field		
1917	Charles Zeigler	Romar A.A. of Dorchester	5–0	Central Park Field		
1946	Roche Pires	Sandwich	5–1			
1946	Roche Pires	Bourne	15–0			
1948	Ed Peterson	Sandwich	5–0		5-inning game	
1950	Roche Pires	Maritime	7–0		7-inning game	
1952	Jack McCarthy	Falmouth Falcons	2–1	Central Park Field	Not to be confused with CCBL HOF'er Jack McCarthy	
1964	Bud Knittel	Wareham	1–0	Clem Spillane Field		
1965	Carl Boteze	Wareham	19–0	Guv Fuller Field		
1966	Len Sheflott	Sagamore	3–0	Guv Fuller Field	6-inning game	
1966	Noel Kinski	Wareham	16–0	Guv Fuller Field	6-inning game; Combined	
1966	Gordy Engstrom	Wareham	16–0	Guv Fuller Field	6-inning game; Combined	
1967	John Hefferon	Wareham	4–0	Clem Spillane Field		
1967	Ron Drews	Bourne	6–0	Guv Fuller Field	7-inning game	
1971	Jim Jachym	Cotuit	3–0	Lowell Park		
1971	Russ Peach	Yarmouth	3–0	Simpkins Field		
1996	Eric Milton	Orleans	2–0	Eldredge Park		
2006	Kris Dobrowiecki	Bourne	5–0	Doran Park	8-inning game; Combined	
2006	Sean Morgan	Bourne	5–0	Doran Park	8-inning game; Combined	
2006	Brandon Copp	Bourne	5–0	Doran Park	8-inning game; Combined	
2006	Sam Demel	Bourne	5–0	Doran Park	8-inning game; Combined	

== Managerial history ==
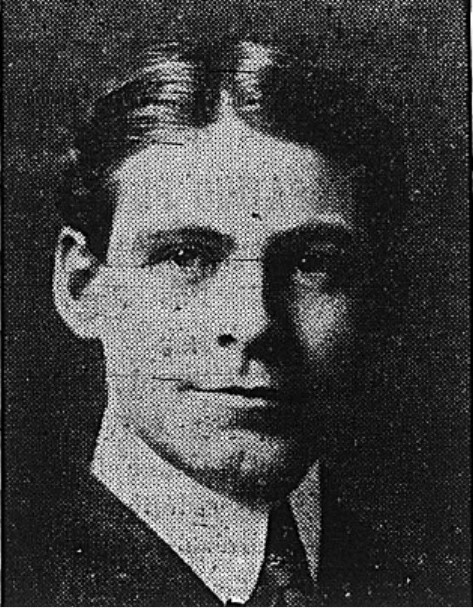
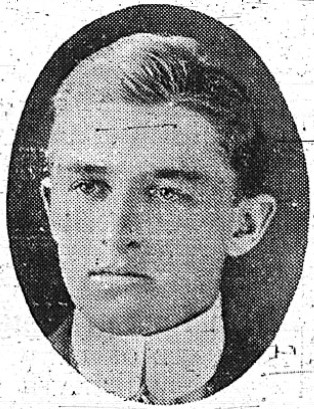
H. Newton Marshall (left) managed the Falmouth Cottage Club team from 1913 to 1916. Dartmouth's Ralph Mendall (right) was team captain in 1913 and 1914.

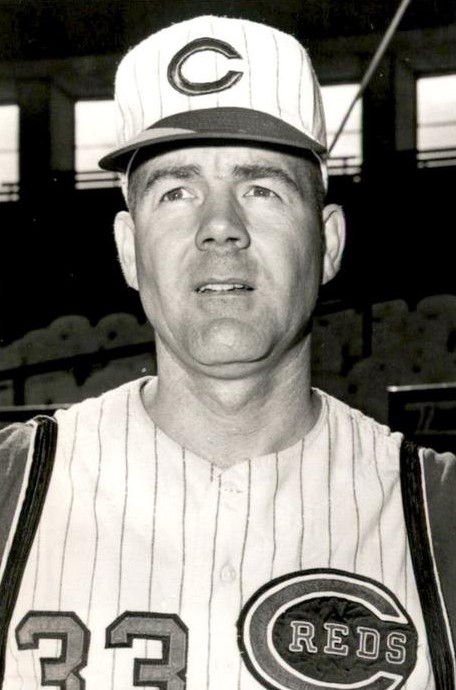
Al Worthington enjoyed a 14-year major league playing career. He skippered the Commodores to the 1980 CCBL championship.

Manager	Seasons	Total Seasons	Championship Seasons
H. Newton Marshall	1913–1916	4	
Earl White	1917	1	
Lewis E. Whiting	1918	1	
Dave Morey	1919–1921	3	
Byron H. Parker; Frank Silva	1923	1	1923
L.P. Jones; Harry B. Albro	1924	1	
Arthur "Dutch" Ayer	1925	1	
Chippy Gaw	1926	1	
Curly Oden	1927–1928	2	
Linn Wells	1929–1930	2	1929
Asa Small	1930	1	
Jack Walsh	1931–1936	6	1931, 1932, 1935
Bill Boehner	1937–1938	2	1938
Buzz Harvey	1939	1	1939
John DeMello	1946–1948	3	1946
Willard E. Boyden	1949–1953	5	
Jack Cavanaugh	1954–1955	2	
Tony Cunha	1956; 1958; 1960–1962	5	
Joe Allietta	1957	1	
Joseph Parent, Jr.	1959	1	
Don Prohovich	1963	1	
Charles Hitchcock	1964	1	
Bill Livesey	1965–1972	8	1966, 1968, 1969, 1970, 1971
Andy Baylock	1973–1974; 1979	3	
Jack Gillis	1975–1976	2	
Dan Gooley	1977	1	
Steve Steitz	1978	1	
Al Worthington	1980	1	1980
Jack Leggett	1981	1	
Jeff Albies	1982	1	
Bob Allietta	1983	1	
Ed Lyons	1984	1	
Jim Frye	1985	1	
Ed Cardieri	1986–1987	2	
Bill Lagos	1988	1	
Rich Piergustavo	1989–1990	2	
Dan O'Brien	1991	1	
Arthur "Ace" Adams	1992–1993	2	
Harvey Shapiro	1994–1998	5	
Jeff Trundy	1999–2024	25*	
Jarrod Saltalamacchia	2025	1	
Jack Dahm	2026	1	

(*) - Season count excludes 2020 CCBL season cancelled due to coronavirus pandemic.

== Broadcasters ==
All 44 Falmouth Commodores games are broadcast live to YouTube. All home games feature multiple cameras, graphics, replays, and live audio commentary, while away games consist of only live audio. Below are the former and current interns to serve as play-by-play broadcasters for the Falmouth Commodores:

- Joshua Weisz (University of Maryland) 2007
- Mike Couzens (Syracuse University) 2008, 2009
- Landon Stolar (Syracuse University) 2008, 2009
- Ted Conroy (Syracuse University) 2010
- John Nolan (Syracuse University) 2011
- Chet Davis (Syracuse University) 2011, 2012
- Andrew Kannell (Syracuse University) 2012
- Jay Fazzino (Trinity College) 2012
- Bradley Whitaker (Trinity College) 2012
- Gabrielle Lucivero (Boston University) 2013
- Meredith Perri (Boston University) 2013
- David Lauterbach (Syracuse University) 2014
- Varun Raghupathi (Syracuse University) 2014
- Alexa Galloway (Boston University) 2014
- Joe Weil (Boston University) 2015
- Brynn Foley (Syracuse University) 2015
- Michael Tricarico (Syracuse University) 2015
- Josh Hess (Syracuse University) 2016
- Chris Picher (Boston University) 2016
- Blake Benard (Arizona State University) 2016, 2017
- Josh Eastern (Indiana University Bloomington) 2017
- Brandon Ball (Roosevelt University) 2017
- Mariah Janos (Syracuse University) 2017
- David Korzeniowski (University of Notre Dame, Northwestern University) 2018, 2019
- Danny LaRose (University of Miami) 2018, 2019
- Katie Florio (Clemson University) 2019
- Joanne Bethea (Clemson University) 2021
- Matt Levine (University of Maryland) 2021
- David Hadar (Penn State University) 2021
- Trey Redfield (Syracuse University) 2022
- Carter Bainbridge (Syracuse University) 2022
- Logan Soforenko (California Lutheran University) 2022
- Destiny Sanchez (Penn State University) 2023
- Matt Venezia (Arizona State University) 2023
- Zach Surdenik (Michigan State University) 2023
- Aiden Blanc (Arizona State University) 2024
- MJ Newsom (University of Southern California) 2024
- Braden Schenck (Virginia Tech) 2024
- Ryan Martin (University of Maryland) 2025
- Andrew Della Piana (Syracuse University) 2025
- Ben Haller (Indiana University Bloomington) 2025

== See also ==
- Falmouth Commodores players
