= 2018 Oregon State Beavers baseball team =

American college baseball season

2018 Oregon State Beavers baseball

College World Series National Champions Corvallis Super Regional champions Corvallis Regional champions
- Conference: Pac-12 Conference

Ranking
- Coaches: No. 1
- CB: No. 1
- Record: 55–12–1 (20–9–1 Pac-12)
- Head coach: Pat Casey (24th season)
- Associate head coach: Pat Bailey (11th season)
- Assistant coaches: Nate Yeskie (10th season); Andy Jenkins (6th season)
- Home stadium: Goss Stadium at Coleman Field

2018 Pac-12 Conference baseball standings
	Conf.						Overall
Team	W		L		T	PCT	W		L		T	PCT
No. 18 Stanford ‍†‍‍^{y}	22	–	8	–	0	.733	46	–	12	–	0	.793
No. 1 Oregon State ‍‍‍^{y}	20	–	9	–	1	.683	55	–	12	–	1	.816
No. 8 Washington ‍‍‍^{y}	20	–	10	–	0	.667	35	–	26	–	0	.574
No. 25 UCLA ‍‍‍^{y}	19	–	11	–	0	.633	38	–	21	–	0	.644
California ‍‍‍	16	–	14	–	0	.533	32	–	22	–	0	.593
Arizona ‍‍‍	14	–	16	–	0	.467	34	–	22	–	0	.607
Arizona State ‍‍‍	13	–	17	–	0	.433	23	–	32	–	0	.418
Southern California ‍‍‍	12	–	18	–	0	.400	26	–	28	–	0	.481
Oregon ‍‍‍	12	–	18	–	0	.400	26	–	29	–	0	.473
Washington State ‍‍‍	8	–	21	–	1	.283	16	–	33	–	1	.330
Utah ‍‍‍	8	–	22	–	0	.267	16	–	39	–	0	.291
† – Conference champion y – Invited to the NCAA tournament As of June 29, 2018; Rankings from Collegiate Baseball

The 2018 Oregon State Beavers baseball team represented Oregon State University in the 2018 NCAA Division I baseball season. The Beavers played their home games at Goss Stadium at Coleman Field and were members of the Pac-12 Conference. The team was coached by Pat Casey in his 24th and final season at Oregon State. The Beavers began the season ranked #2 by Baseball America and were unanimously selected by Pac-12 coaches to repeat as conference champions.

They won their third national championship by defeating Arkansas in the 2018 College World Series. It was only the second time in College World Series history that a team won the championship after losing their first game of the tournament and the first game of the championship series. The first team to do that was the 2006 Oregon State Beavers.

== Season ==
On March 11, head coach Pat Casey was suspended by the NCAA for 4 games as a result of contact made on March 9 with third base umpire Mark Buchanan while disputing a check-swing call against a Cal State Fullerton batter. Casey was ejected following the contact and the game resulted in the Beavers' first loss of the season 3–5. Associate head coach Pat Bailey led the team during Casey's suspension.

Entering into the final game of the regular season against UCLA Oregon State found itself 1/2 game behind Stanford for the Pac-12 crown. A win against UCLA coupled with a Stanford loss to Washington, who was also in contention for the league championship, would have given the Beavers their second straight Pac-12 championship. Oregon State would go on to lose against UCLA and Stanford rallied to win against Washington to give them their first Pac-12 championship since 2004.

In the postseason tournament the Beavers were selected as the #3 overall national seed, which guaranteed home field advantage for both the Regionals and Super Regionals. Only defending national champion Florida (#1) and Pac-12 champion Stanford (#2) were seeded higher.

== Statistics and accomplishments ==
Season

- 1st team to lead NCAA in win/loss percentage (.864) in back-to-back seasons since Southern University (.820) in 2001 and 2002
- Program best record over two seasons 111–17–1 (.864)
- 16 PAC 12 series victories in a row - Began May 22, 2016, at USC, ended March 31, 2018, at Utah
- Highest draft pick taken in school history - Rd 1 pick 4 - Nick Madrigal

College World Series

- CWS Record 5 doubles - Trevor Larnach
- CWS Record 17 hits - Adley Rutschman
- CWS Pitching Record 4–0 - Kevin Abel
- CWS Pitching Record - 2–0 in Championship Series - Kevin Abel
- CWS Pitching Record - 10 Innings 0 Runs in Championship Series - Kevin Abel
- CWS Record Best Pitching Performance - Kevin Abel (Complete Game - 2 hits, 0 Runs)
- CWS Record Best Hitting Duo - 32 Hits - Adley Rutschman (17), Trevor Larnach (15)
- CWS Record - Best record in CWS Championship Matches 3–0 (Tied with Minnesota)
- 2nd Team to lose first game of CWS and CWS Finals and win the tournament (2006 Oregon State Beavers first team to accomplish this)
- Oregon State played 8 out of 16 games in CWS
- Oregon State scored 35 of 59 runs with 2 outs
- Oregon State scored 28 of 59 runs in the 7th inning or later
- Oregon State scored go-ahead winning runs in the 7th inning or later during 3 games (Washington 7th inning, North Carolina 8th inning, Arkansas 9th inning)
- Shutout Arkansas in Championship Game, which was the first shutout for Arkansas in the 2018 season and the first time in 99 games

CWS Runs Per Inning
1st	2nd	3rd	4th	5th	6th	7th	8th	9th	Total
6	6	10	2	6	1	10	11	7	59

CWS Runs Per Out
0 Outs	1 Out	2 Outs	Total
6	18	35	59

== College World Series ==
Oregon State vs North Carolina (Game 1)

On June 16, 2018, Oregon State dropped the opening game of the CWS to North Carolina by a score of 8–6. Oregon State was first on the board when Trevor Larnach tripled in the bottom of the 1st to drive in leadoff batter Steven Kwan. The Tarheels matched the Beavers 1–1 in the 2nd, before taking a commanding 6–1 lead in the top of the 3rd. This marked the first time all season Oregon State gave up 6 runs in the first 3 innings. A controversial safe call at third base in the top of the 7th helped sustain The Tarheels inning, when Beavers' 3rd baseman Gretler appeared to tag Tarheels runner Martorano, but was ruled safe. Instant replay would say otherwise, but the call was non-reviewable. Martorano was driven in by the next batter, increasing the Tarheels lead to 7–4.

- The game would go on record to be the longest game in CWS History at 4 hours, 21 minutes.
- Only 10 previous teams have lost their opening game in the CWS and won the tournament.
- This match-up was the third CWS where Oregon State and North Carolina have played each other. Oregon State eliminated North Carolina in all three match-ups, with a CWS record of 5–2.

Oregon State vs Washington (Game 5)

On June 18, 2018, Oregon State defeated the Washington Huskies in the first elimination game of the CWS by a score of 14–5. This marked the 4th meeting between the two conference rivals this season, with Oregon State leading the series 2–1. Washington took a 3–0 lead in the bottom of the 3rd, before giving up 4 runs and surrendering the lead in the top of the 5th. Washington was quick to respond, taking a 5–4 lead before a 4 1/2-hour rain delay in the top of the 6th. Washington walked in the tying run after play resumed in the 6th, and would be shutout for the remainder of the game. Lead-off hitter Steven Kwan injured his hamstring while at bat in the top of the 3rd inning. Kwan would sit out the majority of the College World Series, starting only the opening game of the finals against Arkansas.

- This was the first ever CWS appearance for Washington.

Oregon State vs North Carolina (Game 9)

On June 20, 2018, Oregon State defeated the North Carolina Tarheels in an elimination game by a score of 11–6. The Beavers jumped out to an early 3–0 lead, before the Tarheels tied the game in the bottom of a 3rd with the assist of a controversial fair ball call. The hit drove in 2 runs and was deemed non-reviewable. Oregon State trailed 6–3 in the top of the 8th with 1 out, before Adley Rutschman crushed a base hit double to center field, driving in 3 runs to tie the game 6–6. The Beavers continued to pile on runs into the 8th inning, while shutting the Tarheels out for the remainder of the game.

- This game marked the third time Oregon State eliminated North Carolina in the CWS. The previous two eliminations came in the championship series in 2006 and 2007.

Oregon State vs Mississippi St (Game 11) On June 22, 2018, Oregon State defeated the Mississippi State Bulldogs by a score of 12–2. Mississippi State appeared to have the blessings of the College Baseball Gods throughout the tournament, staving off five elimination games before arriving in Omaha. Mississippi State quickly put up 1 run in the top of the 1st, and but failed to establish their presence for the remainder of the game. Oregon State went on a hitting frenzy with a barrage of runs in the 2nd and 7th inning. In the 7th inning, head coach Pat Casey sent his son, Joe Casey, to pinch hit for Tyler Malone. Casey dug a pitch out of the ground for a base hit over 2nd and his first CWS RBI.

Oregon State vs Mississippi St (Game 13) On June 23, 2018, Oregon State defeated the Mississippi State Bulldogs by a score of 5–2. The Beavers scored all 5 runs with 2 outs in the top of the 3rd, the final three runs coming on DH Tyler Malone's home run. The Bulldogs appeared to have regained favor of the College Baseball Gods with a last minute rally brewing in the bottom of the 9th, as Oregon State pitcher, Jake Mulholland, loaded the bases with a 5–2 lead and Jordan Westburg at bat. Westburg was fresh off a CWS Grand Slam against North Carolina, and was looking to become the first player ever to hit 2 CWS Grand Slams. Westburg blasted a grounder to shortstop Cadyn Grenier, which appeared to be glued to the inside of Grenier's glove, before finding its way to 2nd baseman Nick Madrigal for the final out.

- The loss was the final game for Mississippi State interim head coach Gary Henderson, who led the Bulldogs on an improbable run to the CWS Semifinals. Gary Henderson won the 2018 National College Baseball Writers Association Coach of the Year and the 2018 Perfect Game/Rawlings Coach of the Year. Henderson gave a heartfelt speech in his final post game conference, as he appeared to know his days as a Bulldog were numbered. He was fired the next day, and replaced by Chris Lemonis out of Indiana.

Oregon State vs Arkansas (Game 14)

On June 26, 2018, the Arkansas Razorbacks defeated the Oregon State Beavers, 4–1, in the opening game of the CWS Finals. The CWS Finals were scheduled to begin on the previous day, but were delayed due to rain, giving Oregon State an extra day to rest their bullpen. This defeat marked Oregon State's first loss to an SEC team all season, and the first loss to an SEC team since losing game 2 of the CWS Semi-finals to LSU in 2017. The game was marred by a controversial interference call which lead to a double play and took a run off the board for the Beavers. Oregon State was unable to recover from the shift in momentum, going scoreless for the remainder of the game.

- Oregon State is 1–2 in opening games of the CWS finals.
- Trevor Larnach set the CWS Record for doubles in the tournament (5)

Oregon State vs Arkansas (Game 15)

On June 27, 2018, Oregon State defeated Arkansas 5–3 to even the series 1–1. Arkansas appeared in complete control of the game, and on their way to certain victory, when Arkansas missed a game winning pop-up foul ball off the bat of Cadyn Grenier in the top of the 9th. The ball fell between the first base line and the wall, with the first baseman, right fielder, and second baseman honing in on the game sealing pop-up. The second baseman, Carson Shaddy, bumped first baseman Jared Gates while running towards the ball, causing Gates to take his eye off the ball, Shaddy to overrun the ball, and right fielder Eric Cole to pull up. The ball landed foul between the 3 Arkansas players, giving Oregon State a second chance. Cadyn Grenier knocked in the game-tying run 2 pitches later. Trevor Larnach came to the plate with Arkansas still in shock, boasting the most home runs of the season for the Beavers, and hit a two-run shot over the head of Cole to win the game, 5–3.

Oregon State vs Arkansas (Game 16)

On June 28, 2018, Oregon State defeated Arkansas, 5–0, to win their third College World Series championship. Oregon State pitcher Kevin Abel worked himself into a jam in the top of the 3rd, loading the bases with one out against the Razorbacks, before going on to retire 20 batters in a row. Abel became the first pitcher to win four games in the CWS, and two games in the CWS Finals. He pitched only the 4th complete game shutout in a championship game, with the lowest hit total of those games (2). Oregon State catcher Adley Rutschman set the CWS hits record during this game, with 17 hits. Rutschman won the CWS Most Outstanding Player Award.

== Roster ==
2018 Oregon State Beavers roster
Pitchers: 12 Tweedt, Sam - (redshirt) Junior; 15 Heimlich, Luke - Senior; 19 Donovan, Dakota - (redshirt) Freshman; 22 Gambrell, Grant - Sophomore; 23 Abel, Kevin - Freshman; 24 Burns, Nathan - Freshman; 26 Fehmel, Bryce - Junior; 31 Britton, Jordan - Junior; 32 Verburg, Mitchell - Sophomore; 34 Chamberlain, Christian - Freshman; 37 Eisert, Brandon - Sophomore; 38 Mulholland, Jake - Sophomore; 45 Warren, Cade - (redshirt) Freshman; 49 Pearce, Dylan - Junior	Catchers: 16 Taylor, Zak - Junior; 17 Claunch, Troy - Freshman; 35 Rutschman, Adley - Sophomore; Infielders: 1 McMahan, Kyler - Freshman; 2 Grenier, Cadyn - Junior; 3 Madrigal, Nick - Junior; 7 Malone, Tyler - Sophomore; 9 Armstrong, Andy - Sophomore; 10 Gretler, Michael - Senior; 18 Ober, Ryan - Freshman; 20 Clayton, Zach - Freshman; 30 Zalesky, Zack - (redshirt) Freshman; 44 McGarry, Alex - Sophomore	Outfielders: 4 Kwan, Steven - Junior; 6 Casey, Joe - (redshirt) Freshman; 11 Larnach, Trevor - Junior; 14 Willy, Elliot - (redshirt) Freshman; 28 Nobach, Kyle - (redshirt) Senior; 29 Anderson, Jack - (redshirt) Senior; 33 Jones, Preston - Sophomore

== Schedule and results ==
Legend
	Oregon State win
	Oregon State loss
	Postponement/Tie
**Bold**	Oregon State team member

2018 Oregon State Beavers baseball game log (55–12–1)
Regular season (44–10–1)

February (8–0)
Date	Opponent	Rank	Site/stadium	Score	Win	Loss	Save	Attendance	Overall record	Pac-12 Record
Sanderson Ford College Baseball Classic
Feb 16	vs. New Mexico*	No. 2	Surprise Stadium • Surprise, AZ	**W** 5–2	Heimlich (1–0)	Slaten (0–1)	**Eisert (1)**	2,213	1–0	–
Feb 17	vs. Gonzaga*	No. 2	Surprise Stadium • Surprise, AZ	**W** 4–3	Chamberlain (1–0)	Davis, T (0–1)	**Mulholland (1)**	2,963	2–0	–
Feb 18	vs. Cal Poly*	No. 2	Surprise Stadium • Surprise, AZ	**W** 16–7	Fehmel (1–0)	Ay (0–1)	None	1,893	3–0	–
Feb 19	vs. New Mexico*	No. 2	Surprise Stadium • Surprise, AZ	**W** 15–3	Britton (1–0)	Dye (0–1)	None	2,163	4–0	–
Big 10–Pac-12 Spring Training College Baseball Classic
Feb 22	vs. Nebraska*	No. 2	Surprise Stadium • Surprise, AZ	**W** 9–1	Heimlich (2–0)	Waldron (1–1)	None	3,364	5–0	–
Feb 23	vs. Ohio State*	No. 2	Surprise Stadium • Surprise, AZ	**W** 10–8	Abel (1–0)	Kinker (1–1)	**Mulholland (2)**	2,289	6–0	–
Feb 24	vs. Nebraska*	No. 2	Surprise Stadium • Surprise, AZ	**W** 10–3	Fehmel (2–0)	McSteen (1–1)	None	2,619	7–0	–
Feb 25	vs. Ohio State*	No. 2	Surprise Stadium • Surprise, AZ	**W** 6–1	Gambrell (1–0)	Pavlopoulos (1–1)	None	1,843	8–0	–

March (13–4)
Date	Opponent	Rank	Site/stadium	Score	Win	Loss	Save	Attendance	Overall record	Pac-12 Record
Mar 2	Hartford*	No. 1	Goss Stadium at Coleman Field • Corvallis, OR	**W** 3–2	**Heimlich (3–0)**	Pinkerton (0–1)	**Pearce (1)**	3,174	9–0	
Mar 3	Hartford*	No. 1	Goss Stadium at Coleman Field • Corvallis, OR	**W** 5–0	**Fehmel (3–0)**	DeVito (0–1)	None	3,376	10–0	
Mar 3	Hartford*	No. 1	Goss Stadium at Coleman Field • Corvallis, OR	**W** 5–4	**Eisert (1–0)**	Plourde (0–1)	**Mulholland (3)**	3,376	11–0	
Mar 4	Hartford*	No. 1	Goss Stadium at Coleman Field • Corvallis, OR	**W** 5–0	**Gambrell (1–0)**	Florence (0–2)	None	3,249	11–0	
Mar 6	Portland*	No. 1	Goss Stadium at Coleman Field • Corvallis, OR	**W** 6–3	**Eisert (1–0)**	Knutson (0–1)	**Mulholland (4)**	3,136	13–0	
Mar 9	Cal State Fullerton*	No. 1	Goss Stadium at Coleman Field • Corvallis, OR	**L** 3–5	Wilson (1–0)	**Eisert (1–1)**	Conine (2)	3,326	13–1	
Mar 10	Cal State Fullerton*	No. 1	Goss Stadium at Coleman Field • Corvallis, OR	**W** 6–4	**Pearce (1–0)**	Bibee (0–2)	**Mulholland (5)**	3,608	14–1	
Mar 11	Cal State Fullerton*	No. 1	Goss Stadium at Coleman Field • Corvallis, OR	**W** 5–4	**Chamberlain (1–0)**	Workman (0–3)	**Mulholland (6)**	3,542	15–1	
Mar 16	at California	No. 1	Evans Diamond • Berkeley, CA	**W** 4–3	**Heimlich (4–0)**	Horn (3–1)	**Mulholland (7)**	768	16–1	1–0
Mar 17	at California	No. 1	Evans Diamond • Berkeley, CA	**W** 10–4	**Abel (1–0)**	Sabouri (1–2)	**Eisert (2)**	1,154	17–1	1–0
Mar 18	at California	No. 1	Evans Diamond • Berkeley, CA	**W** 6–4	**Gambrell (3–0)**	Ladrech (1–3)	**Mulholland (8)**	1,453	18–1	3–0
Mar 23	Washington	No. 1	Goss Stadium at Coleman Field • Corvallis, OR	**RAINED OUT** (Rescheduled for March 24th)						
Mar 24	Washington	No. 1	Goss Stadium at Coleman Field • Corvallis, OR	**W** 16–1	**Heimlich (5–0)**	Knowles (1–2)	None	3,568	19–1	4–0
Mar 24	Washington	No. 1	Goss Stadium at Coleman Field • Corvallis, OR	**W** 5–2	**Eisert (3–1)**	DeMers (1–1)	**Pearce (2)**	3,261	20–1	5–0
Mar 25	Washington	No. 1	Goss Stadium at Coleman Field • Corvallis, OR	**L** 4–8	Jones (3–2)	**Gambrell (3–1)**	None	3,431	20–2	5–1
Mar 29	at Utah	No. 1	Smith's Ballpark • Salt Lake City, UT	**L** 7–8	Stoltz (1–1)	**Eisert (3–2)**	Rebar (2)	2,007	20–3	5–2
Mar 30	at Utah	No. 1	Smith's Ballpark • Salt Lake City, UT	**W** 9–5	**Heimlich (6–0)**	Rebar (0–1)	None	1,972	21–3	6–2
Mar 31	at Utah	No. 1	Smith's Ballpark • Salt Lake City, UT	**L** 8–11	Brocoff (1–3)	**Fehmel (3–1)**	None	2,051	21–4	6–3

April (10–3)
Date	Opponent	Rank	Site/stadium	Score	Win	Loss	Save	Attendance	Overall record	PAC-12 Record
Apr 2	No. 20 Nevada*	No. 3	Goss Stadium at Coleman Field • Corvallis, OR	**W** 3–2	**Mulholland (1–0)**	Cabinian (0–1)	None	3,215	22–4	6–3
Apr 3	No. 20 Nevada*	No. 3	Goss Stadium at Coleman Field • Corvallis, OR	**W** 8–7	**Heimlich (7–0)**	Powell (1–3)	None	3,209	23–4	6–3
Apr 6	at Arizona	No. 3	Hi Corbett Field • Tucson, AZ	**W** 6–2	**Fehmel (4–1)**	Deason (3–2)	**Mulholland (9)**	4,645	24–4	7–3
Apr 7	at Arizona	No. 3	Hi Corbett Field • Tucson, AZ	**L** 4–15	Flynn (5–1)	**Heimlich (7–1)**	None	4,284	24–5	7–4
Apr 8	at Arizona	No. 3	Hi Corbett Field • Tucson, AZ	**L** 5–6	Megill (1–2)	**Mulholland (1–1)**	None	3.032	24–6	7–5
Apr 13	at No. 24 Missouri State*	No. 8	Hammons Field • Springfield, MO	**W** 17–6	**Heimlich (8–1)**	Coleman (5–2)	None	646	25–6	7–5
Apr 13/14	at No. 24 Missouri State*	No. 8	Hammons Field • Springfield, MO	**W** 10–2	**Gambrell (4–1)**	Buckner (3–3)	None	566	26–6	7–5
Apr 14	at No. 24 Missouri State*	No. 8	Hammons Field • Springfield, MO	**CANCELLED**						
Apr 19	Oregon	No. 7	Goss Stadium at Coleman Field • Corvallis, OR	**W** 5–2	**Heimlich (9–1)**	Mercer (4–4)	**Mulholland (10)**	3,692	27–6	8–5
Apr 20	Oregon	No. 7	Goss Stadium at Coleman Field • Corvallis, OR	**W** 2–1	**Fehmel (5–1)**	Yovan (3–2)	**Mulholland (11)**	3,760	28–6	9–5
Apr 21	Oregon	No. 7	Goss Stadium at Coleman Field • Corvallis, OR	**W** 11–5	**Gambrell (5–1)**	Somers (1–6)	None	3,800	29–6	10–5
Apr 24	at Portland*	No. 5	Ron Tonkin Field • Hillsboro, OR	**W** 9–2	**Britton (1–0)**	Morris (1–2)	**Eisert (3)**	4,800	30–6	10–5
Apr 27	Arizona State*	No. 5	Goss Stadium at Coleman Field • Corvallis, OR	**W** 6–2	**Heimlich (10–1)**	Marsh (3–3)	None	3,431	31–6	11–5
Apr 28	Arizona State	No. 5	Goss Stadium at Coleman Field • Corvallis, OR	**L** 5–8	Raish (3–1)	**Eisert (3–3)**	None	3,751	31–7	11–6
Apr 29	Arizona State	No. 5	Goss Stadium at Coleman Field • Corvallis, OR	**W** 6–5	**Pearce (1–0)**	Lingoes (6–4)	**Mulholland (12)**	3,685	31–7	11–6

May (13–3–1)
Date	Opponent	Rank	Site/stadium	Score	Win	Loss	Save	Attendance	Overall record	PAC-12 Record
May 1	at Oregon*	No. 5	PK Park • Eugene, OR	**W** 4–3	**Abel (3–0)**	Acuna (1–2)	**Mulholland (13)**	1,772	33–7	11–6
May 4	at Washington State	No. 5	Bailey-Brayton Field • Pullman, WA	**W** 17–3	**Heimlich (11–1)**	Moyle (0–1)	None	1,484	34–7	13–6
May 5	at Washington State	No. 5	Bailey-Brayton Field • Pullman, WA	**W** 9–1	**Fehmel (6–1)**	Sunitsch (5–2)	**Eisert (4)**	1,386	35–7	14–6
May 6	at Washington State	No. 5	Bailey-Brayton Field • Pullman, WA	**T** 7–7	None	None	None	1,115	35–7–1	14–6–1
May 8	at Oregon*	No. 4	PK Park • Eugene, Oregon	**W** 10–0	**Eisert (4–3)**	Kafka (3–1)	None	1,432	36–7–1	14–6–1
May 11	No. 1 Stanford	No. 4	Goss Stadium at Coleman Field • Corvallis, OR	**W** 6–2	**Heimlich (11–1)**	Beck (7–3)	None	3,830	37–7–1	15–6–1
May 12	No. 1 Stanford	No. 4	Goss Stadium at Coleman Field • Corvallis, OR	**W** 10–0	**Fehmel (7–1)**	Bubic (7–1)	None	3,864	38–7–1	16–6–1
May 13	No. 1 Stanford	No. 4	Goss Stadium at Coleman Field • Corvallis, OR	**L** 6–9	Little (1–0)	**Mulholland (1–2)**	None	3,805	38–8–1	16–7–1
May 14	San Diego*	No. 2	Goss Stadium at Coleman Field • Corvallis, OR	**W** 23–6	**Burns (1–0)**	Crow (0–1)	**Donovan (1)**	3,318	39–8–1	16–7–1
May 15	San Diego*	No. 2	Goss Stadium at Coleman Field • Corvallis, OR	**W** 19–6	**Tweedt (1–0)**	Friedman (1–3)	None	3,425	40–8–1	16–7–1
May 18	at USC	No. 2	Dedeaux Field • Los Angeles, CA	**W** 4–0	**Heimlich (13–1)**	Hurt (4–5)	**Mulholland (14)**	500	41–8–1	17–7–1
May 19	at USC	No. 2	Dedeaux Field • Los Angeles, CA	**W** 8–1	**Fehmel (8–1)**	Longrie (4–6)	None	955	41–8–1	18–7–1
May 20	at USC	No. 2	Dedeaux Field • Los Angeles, CA	**L** 0–8	Bates (5–3)	**Abel (3–1)**	None	1,008	41–9–1	18–8–1
May 24	No. 21 UCLA	No. 3	Goss Stadium at Coleman Field • Corvallis, OR	**W** 1–0	**Heimlich (14–1)**	Bird (7–4)	**Eisert (5)**	3,567	43–9–1	19–8–1
May 25	No. 21 UCLA	No. 3	Goss Stadium at Coleman Field • Corvallis, OR	**W** 4–1	**Fehmel (9–1)**	Pettway (8–4)	**Abel (1)**	3,756	44–9–1	20–8–1
May 26	No. 21 UCLA	No. 3	Goss Stadium at Coleman Field • Corvallis, OR	**L** 1–4	Garcia (7–1)	**Burns (1–1)**	Mora (3)	3,831	44–10–1	20–9–1

Postseason (11–2)

Corvallis Regional (3–0)
Date	Opponent	Rank	Site/stadium	Score	Win	Loss	Save	Attendance	Overall record	Regional Record
June 1	(4) Northwestern State	No. 1 (1)	Goss Stadium at Coleman Field • Corvallis, OR	**W** 9–3	**Fehmel (10–1)**	Heisler (7–3)	None	3,908	45–10–1	1–0
June 2	(2) LSU	No. 1 (1)	Goss Stadium at Coleman Field • Corvallis, OR	**W** 14–1	**Heimlich (15–1)**	Hess (7–6)	None	4,009	46–10–1	2–0
June 3	(2) LSU	No. 1 (1)	Goss Stadium at Coleman Field • Corvallis, OR	**W** 11–0	**Abel (4–1)**	Fontenot (3–1)	None	3,915	47–10–1	3–0

Corvallis Super Regional (2–0)
Date	Opponent	Rank	Site/stadium	Score	Win	Loss	Save	Attendance	Overall record	Super Reg. Record
June 8	No. 7 (14) Minnesota	No. 1 (3)	Goss Stadium at Coleman Field • Corvallis, OR	**W** 8–1	**Heimlich (16–1)**	Meyer (8–4)	None	3,960	48–10–1	1–0
June 9	No. 7 (14) Minnesota	No. 1 (3)	Goss Stadium at Coleman Field • Corvallis, OR	**W** 6–3	**Chamberlain (3–0)**	Meyer (2–3)	**Mulholland (15)**	4,025	49–10–1	2–0

College World Series (6–2)
Date	Opponent	Rank	Site/stadium	Score	Win	Loss	Save	Attendance	Overall record	CWS record
June 16	No. 3 (6) North Carolina	No. 1 (3)	TD Ameritrade Park • Omaha, NE	**L** 6–8	O'Brien (7–0)	**Heimlich (16–2)**	Criswell (1)	21,628	49–11–1	0–1
June 18	No. 7 Washington	No. 1 (3)	TD Ameritrade Park • Omaha, NE	**W** 14–5	**Abel (5–1)**	Hardy (5–4)	None	16,881	50–11–1	1–1
June 20	No. 3 (6) North Carolina	No. 1 (3)	TD Ameritrade Park • Omaha, NE	**W** 11–6	**Mulholland (2–2)**	Daniels (6–1)	None	21,568	51–11–1	2–1
June 22	No. 8 Mississippi State	No. 1 (3)	TD Ameritrade Park • Omaha, NE	**W** 12–2	**Eisert (5–3)**	Billingsley (5–4)	None	21,002	52–11–1	3–1
June 23	No. 8 Mississippi State	No. 1 (3)	TD Ameritrade Park • Omaha, NE	**W** 5–2	**Abel (6–1)**	Small (5–4)	None	21,821	53–11–1	4–1
June 25	No. 4 (5) Arkansas	No. 1 (3)	TD Ameritrade Park • Omaha, NE	**POSTPONED DUE TO WEATHER**						
June 26	No. 4 (5) Arkansas	No. 1 (3)	TD Ameritrade Park • Omaha, NE	**L** 1–4	Knight (14–0)	**Heimlich (16–3)**	Cronin (14)	25,321	53–12–1	4–2
June 27	No. 4 (5) Arkansas	No. 1 (3)	TD Ameritrade Park • Omaha, NE	**W** 5–3	**Abel (7–1)**	Cronin (2–2)	**Mulholland (16)**	25,580	54–12–1	5–2
June 28	No. 4 (5) Arkansas	No. 1 (3)	TD Ameritrade Park • Omaha, NE	**W** 5–0	**Abel (8–1)**	Campbell (5–7)	None	19,323	55–12–1	6–2

== Rankings ==
Ranking movements Legend: ██ Increase in ranking ██ Decrease in ranking
	Week																			
Poll	Pre	1	2	3	4	5	6	7	8	9	10	11	12	13	14	15	16	17	18	Final
Coaches'	2	2*	2*	2	1	1	1	4	7	6	5	3	3	2	1	2	2*	2*	2*	1
Baseball America	2	2	2	2	1	1	1	5	11	10	6	6	4	2	2	2	2*	2*	2*	1
Collegiate Baseball^	2	2	1	1	1	1	1	3	8	7	5	5	4	2	3	1	1	1	1*	1
NCBWA†	2	2	2	2	1	1	1	4	7	6	5	3	3	2	1	1	1	1*	1*	1

^ Collegiate Baseball ranked 40 teams in their preseason poll, but only ranked 30 teams weekly during the season.
† NCBWA ranks 30 teams in their preseason poll, but only ranks 25 teams weekly during the season.
* A new poll was not released for this week, so for comparison purposes, the previous week's ranking is inserted in this week's slot.

== Awards ==
College World Series: Adley Rutschman -College World Series Most Outstanding Player; Baseball America: Kevin Abel - Freshman of the Year; College Baseball Foundation: Pat Casey - Coach of the Year; Luke Heimlich - National Pitcher of the Year; Cadyn Grenier - College Baseball Shortstop of the Year; American Baseball Coaches Association: Pat Casey - Coach of the Year; D1 Baseball: Kevin Abel - National Freshman of the Year; Pac-12 Player of the Year: Luke Heimlich - Pitcher of the Year (also won 2017 PiOY); Cadyn Grenier - Defensive Player of the Year
Pac-12 All Conference First Team: Bryce Fehmel; Cadyn Grenier (Also named to All-Defensive Team); Luke Heimlich; Steven Kwan; Trevor Larnach; Nick Madrigal (Also named to All-Defensive Team); Adley Rutschman (Also named to All-Defensive Team); Michael Gretler (All-Defensive Team and Honorable Mention only)

== Major League Baseball draft ==
In the 2018 Major League Baseball draft Nick Madrigal became the highest draft pick in Oregon State history when the Chicago White Sox selected him with the 4th pick of the 1st Round. The previous record holder was Michael Conforto, who was selected 10th overall by the New York Mets in the 2014 MLB draft.

Pitcher Drew Rasmussen, who missed the entire 2018 season due to undergoing his second Tommy John surgery, was originally selected 31st overall in the 2017 MLB draft by the Tampa Bay Rays but was unable to come to terms with the team before the July 7th deadline. He was later denied free agency by Major League Baseball.

Two-time Pac-12 Pitcher of the Year, Luke Heimlich, went undrafted for the second straight year. The Texas Rangers announced a month before the draft that they would not select the winningest pitcher in Oregon State history after it was revealed Heimlich pled guilty to sexually molesting a family member when he was 15. Heimlich has since denied the allegations to which he pled guilty as a juvenile saying the guilty plea was "a decision me and my parents thought was the best option to move forward as a family."

2018 MLB Draft results
Player	Position	Round	Overall	MLB team
Nick Madrigal	2B	1st	4th	Chicago White Sox
Trevor Larnach	RF	1st	20th	Minnesota Twins
Cadyn Grenier	SS	1st	37th	Baltimore Orioles
Steven Kwan	OF	5th	163rd	Cleveland Indians
Drew Rasmussen	RHP	6th	185th	Milwaukee Brewers
Michael Gretler	3B	10th	294th	Pittsburgh Pirates
