= Lindsay Meggs =

American baseball coach (born 1962)

Current position
- Title: Assistant coach
- Team: Hawaii
- Conference: Big West

Biographical details
- Born: September 2, 1962 (age 64); San Jose, California, U.S.
- Education: UCLA, B.S. 1985; Azusa Pacific University, M.Ed. 1992

Playing career
- 1981–1984: UCLA
- Position: Third baseman

Coaching career (HC unless noted)
- 1988: De Anza (asst.)
- 1989: Cal Lutheran (asst.)
- 1990: Oxnard
- 1991–1993: Long Beach City College
- 1994–2006: Chico State
- 2007–2009: Indiana State
- 2010–2022: Washington
- 2024–present: Hawaii (assistant)

Head coaching record
- Overall: 967–632–5 (.604)

Accomplishments and honors

Championships
- 2× NCAA Division II (1997, 1999)

Awards
- MVC Coach of the Year (2009); Pac-12 Coach of the Year (2014)

Lindsay Ross Meggs (born September 2, 1962) is an American baseball coach who is currently an assistant coach at the University of Hawaiʻi at Mānoa. He played college baseball for the UCLA Bruins from 1981 to 1984. He then served as the head coach of the Oxnard (1990), Long Beach City (1991–1993), Chico State Wildcats (1994–2006), Indiana State (2007–2009) and the Washington Huskies (2010–2022).

== Early years ==
Born in San Jose, California, Meggs graduated from Saratoga High School in Saratoga and played college baseball at UCLA, starting at third base all four years. He was honorable mention All-Conference in 1983, and drafted after both his junior and senior years. Selected in the 15th round of the 1984 MLB draft, Meggs signed with the Kansas City Royals and enjoyed a brief professional career before returning to UCLA to complete his degree.

== Coaching career ==
After his playing career ended, Meggs began coaching at De Anza College in Cupertino, serving as an assistant for a season in 1988 before moving south to California Lutheran University in Thousand Oaks for another season. Meggs earned his first head coaching opportunity at Oxnard College where he worked for one year in 1990, then moved to Long Beach City College for three seasons. At LBCC, his teams went 75–51–1 (.594) and made the playoffs each year.

=== Chico State ===
Meggs moved north to Cal State Chico in 1994, where he was head coach for 13 years. The Wildcats were a Division II national power under him, winning two national championships, appearing seven times in the Division II College World Series, and claiming eight conference titles. Meggs was Division II National Coach of the Year twice, and regional and conference coach of the year seven times each. The Wildcats' home venue, Ray Bohler Field, was renovated in 1997 and became the 4,200-seat Nettleton Stadium.

=== Indiana State ===
Meggs' success at Chico State landed him a Division I job at Indiana State in Terre Haute, where he worked for three years. The Sycamores were 33–21 (.625) overall and finished second in the Missouri Valley Conference after being picked to finish sixth in the preseason. Four players were named first team All-Conference that season, with five others earning other conference awards. Meggs was named MVC Coach of the Year for his efforts.

=== Washington ===
In 2009, Meggs was introduced as the new head coach at Washington on July 27. In his first season in 2010, the Huskies were 28–28, an improvement of five wins over the previous season. Among his efforts at Washington has been seeking additional personal general enhancements, particularly to Husky Ballpark and the Huskies' indoor facilities. After the 2012 season, three additional years were added to his contract, through 2018.

Following Washington's runner-up finish in the conference in 2014, Meggs was named Pac-12 coach of the year. Picked in the preseason to finish low in the standings, the Huskies posted a 21–9 record in conference and made their first post-season appearance in a decade. Although ranked in the national top ten for much of the season, Washington was overlooked as a regional host. In the NCAA regional at the University of Mississippi in Oxford, Washington was the runner-up, losing two close games to the host Rebels. Both games with Ole Miss were decided by one run and both had over 9,300 in attendance at Swayze Field. (The Rebels won their Super Regional on the road and advanced to semifinals of the College World Series). That summer, Meggs was granted a six-year contract extension at Washington, worth $2.2 million.

On June 6, 2022, the University of Washington announced Meggs' retirement as baseball coach after 13 seasons.

=== Hawaii ===
Meggs was named an assistant coach at Hawaii on January 25, 2024.

== Head coaching record ==
Record table
Season	Team	Overall	Conference	Standing	Postseason
Chico State Wildcats (Northern California Athletic Conference) (1994–1998)
1994	Chico State	26–27	15–20	3rd	
1995	Chico State	29–25–2	18–17	3rd	
1996	Chico State	43–17	25–10	1st	NCAA Division II Regional
1997	Chico State	52–11	30–5	1st	NCAA Division II Champions
1998	Chico State	37–17	23–12	T–1st	NCAA Division II Semifinals
Chico State Wildcats (California Collegiate Athletic Association) (1999–2006)
1999	Chico State	50–17	28–12	2nd	NCAA Division II Champions
2000	Chico State	45–12	30–7	1st	NCAA Division II Regional
2001	Chico State	35–16	25–12	2nd	
2002	Chico State	55–10	33–7	1st	NCAA Division II Runners-up
2003	Chico State	36–18	24–14	2nd	
2004	Chico State	42–21–1	23–15–1	1st	NCAA Division II Quarterfinals
2005	Chico State	42–16–1	24–11	1st	NCAA Division II Quarterfinals
2006	Chico State	46–21	18–11	4th	NCAA Division II Runners-up
Chico State:		538–228–4 (.701)	316–153–1 (.673)		
Indiana State Sycamores (Missouri Valley Conference) (2007–2009)
2007	Indiana State	26–26	7–17	8th	
2008	Indiana State	18–32	9–15	7th	
2009	Indiana State	33–21	15–7	2nd	
Indiana State:		77–79 (.494)	31–39 (.443)		
Washington Huskies (Pacific-10/Pac-12 Conference) (2010–2022)
2010	Washington	28–28	7–17	9th	
2011	Washington	17–37	6–21	10th	
2012	Washington	30–25	13–17	7th	
2013	Washington	24–32	15–15	T–6th	
2014	Washington	41–17–1	21–9	2nd	NCAA Division I Regional
2015	Washington	29–25	14–16	7th	
2016	Washington	33–23	17–13	2nd	NCAA Division I Regional
2017	Washington	28–26	14–16	7th	
2018	Washington	35–26	20–10	3rd	College World Series
2019	Washington	28–24	12–17	8th	
2020	Washington	9–6	0–0		Season canceled due to COVID-19
2021	Washington	20–30	6–21	10th	
2022	Washington	30–26	14–16	T-6th	
Washington:		352–325–1 (.520)	159–188 (.458)		
Total:		967–632–5 (.604)			
National champion Postseason invitational champion Conference regular season champion Conference regular season and conference tournament champion Division regular season champion Division regular season and conference tournament champion Conference tournament champion
