= 2018 UCLA Bruins baseball team =

American college baseball season

2018 UCLA Bruins baseball

NCAA tournament, Minneapolis Regional
- Conference: Pac-12 Conference
- CB: No. 25
- Record: 38–21 (19–11 Pac-12)
- Head coach: John Savage (14th season)
- Hitting coach: Bryant Ward (3rd season)
- Pitching coach: Rex Peters (7th season)
- Home stadium: Jackie Robinson Stadium (Capacity: 1,820)

2018 Pac-12 Conference baseball standings
	Conf.						Overall
Team	W		L		T	PCT	W		L		T	PCT
No. 18 Stanford ‍†‍‍^{y}	22	–	8	–	0	.733	46	–	12	–	0	.793
No. 1 Oregon State ‍‍‍^{y}	20	–	9	–	1	.683	55	–	12	–	1	.816
No. 8 Washington ‍‍‍^{y}	20	–	10	–	0	.667	35	–	26	–	0	.574
No. 25 UCLA ‍‍‍^{y}	19	–	11	–	0	.633	38	–	21	–	0	.644
California ‍‍‍	16	–	14	–	0	.533	32	–	22	–	0	.593
Arizona ‍‍‍	14	–	16	–	0	.467	34	–	22	–	0	.607
Arizona State ‍‍‍	13	–	17	–	0	.433	23	–	32	–	0	.418
Southern California ‍‍‍	12	–	18	–	0	.400	26	–	28	–	0	.481
Oregon ‍‍‍	12	–	18	–	0	.400	26	–	29	–	0	.473
Washington State ‍‍‍	8	–	21	–	1	.283	16	–	33	–	1	.330
Utah ‍‍‍	8	–	22	–	0	.267	16	–	39	–	0	.291
† – Conference champion y – Invited to the NCAA tournament As of June 29, 2018; Rankings from Collegiate Baseball

The 2018 UCLA Bruins baseball team represented the University of California, Los Angeles in the 2018 NCAA Division I baseball season as a member of the Pac-12 Conference. The team was coached by John Savage and played their home games at Jackie Robinson Stadium.

== Previous season ==
The Bruins finished 30–27 overall, and 19–11 in the conference. During the season, the Bruins were invited and participated in the Dodger Stadium Classic in Los Angeles, California. UCLA defeated Michigan to earn 3rd place. In the postseason, the Bruins were invited and participated in the 2017 NCAA Division I baseball tournament, where they lost to San Diego State and Texas in the Long Beach Regional in Long Beach, California.

=== MLB draft selections ===
The Bruins had six individuals selected in the 2017 MLB draft.

Player	Position	Round	Overall	MLB Team
Griffin Canning	Pitcher	2	47	Los Angeles Angels
Sean Bouchard	First baseman	9	266	Colorado Rockies
Scott Burke	Pitcher	20	608	Baltimore Orioles
Nick Valaika	Shortstop	24	718	Pittsburgh Pirates
Brett Stephens	Left fielder	28	836	Colorado Rockies
Moisés Ceja	Pitcher	32	956	Colorado Rockies

== Roster ==
2018 UCLA Bruins baseball team
Players
Coaches

#	Pos.	Name	B/T	Height	Weight	Year	Previous school	Home town
3	INF	Ryan Kreidler	R/R	6 ft 4 in (1.93 m)	198 lb (90 kg)	So	Davis High School	Davis, California
4	INF	Kevin Kendall	L/R	5 ft 10 in (1.78 m)	155 lb (70 kg)	Fr	La Mirada High School	La Mirada, California
5	OF	Garrett Mitchell	L/R	6 ft 3 in (1.91 m)	200 lb (91 kg)	Fr	Orange Lutheran High School	Orange, California
6	INF	Jack Stronach	R/R	6 ft 3 in (1.91 m)	195 lb (88 kg)	So	Helix High School	La Mesa, California
7	INF	Michael Toglia	S/L	6 ft 5 in (1.96 m)	209 lb (95 kg)	So	Gig Harbor High School	Gig Harbor, Washington
8	OF	Jarron Silva	L/L	6 ft 1 in (1.85 m)	170 lb (77 kg)	So	Saint Mary's High School	Stockton, California
9	INF	RJ Teijeiro	L/R	6 ft 1 in (1.85 m)	175 lb (79 kg)	Fr	Saint Francis High School	Foster City, California
10	LHP	Sam Glick	L/L	6 ft 1 in (1.85 m)	170 lb (77 kg)	Fr	El Toro High School	El Toro, California
11	RHP	Jon Olsen	R/R	6 ft 3 in (1.91 m)	201 lb (91 kg)	Jr	Damien High School	Rancho Cucamonga, California
12	LHP	Justin Hooper	R/L	6 ft 8 in (2.03 m)	232 lb (105 kg)	Jr	De La Salle High School	San Ramon, California
14	RHP	Jake Bird	R/R	6 ft 4 in (1.93 m)	210 lb (95 kg)	Sr	West Ranch High School	Valencia, California
15	C	Will McInerny	R/R	5 ft 11 in (1.8 m)	168 lb (76 kg)	So	Laguna Beach High School	Laguna Beach, California
16	C	Kyle Cuellar	L/R	5 ft 11 in (1.8 m)	187 lb (85 kg)	So	La Salle High School	Arcadia, California
18	OF	Jeremy Ydens	R/R	6 ft 2 in (1.88 m)	193 lb (88 kg)	So	Saint Francis High School	Campbell, California
19	RHP	Jack Ralston (redshirt)	R/R	6 ft 6 in (1.98 m)	222 lb (101 kg)	RS So	Hart High School	Santa Clarita, California
20	RHP	Chase Farrell	L/R	6 ft 1 in (1.85 m)	170 lb (77 kg)	Fr	Valencia High School	Santa Clarita, California
21	OF	Jordan Prendiz (redshirt)	L/L	5 ft 10 in (1.78 m)	174 lb (79 kg)	RS Fr	Mount Whitney High School	Visalia, California
24	RHP	Zach Pettway	R/R	6 ft 1 in (1.85 m)	206 lb (93 kg)	Fr	Long Beach Wilson High School	Long Beach, California
25	OF	Daniel Amaral	R/R	6 ft 0 in (1.83 m)	175 lb (79 kg)	Jr	Huntington Beach High School	Huntington Beach, California
26	RHP	Brian Gadsby	R/R	6 ft 2 in (1.88 m)	172 lb (78 kg)	Jr	Crescenta Valley High School	Glendale, California
27	LHP	Garrett Barker (redshirt)	R/L	6 ft 3 in (1.91 m)	192 lb (87 kg)	RS Jr	Laguna Hills High School	Laguna Hills, California
28	INF	Jake Hirabayashi	R/R	5 ft 11 in (1.8 m)	183 lb (83 kg)	Jr	Notre Dame High School	Sherman Oaks, California
29	RHP	Michael Townsend	R/R	6 ft 1 in (1.85 m)	177 lb (80 kg)	Fr	Los Alamitos High School	Los Alamitos, California
30	RHP	Matt Walker (redshirt)	R/R	6 ft 5 in (1.96 m)	180 lb (82 kg)	RS Jr	Clovis North High School	Fresno, California
31	C	Gavin Johns	R/R	6 ft 1 in (1.85 m)	195 lb (88 kg)	Jr	Chaparral High School	Temecula, California
32	RHP	Ryan Garcia	R/R	6 ft 0 in (1.83 m)	180 lb (82 kg)	So	La Salle High School	Sierra Madre, California
33	INF	Chase Strumpf	R/R	6 ft 1 in (1.85 m)	195 lb (88 kg)	So	Junípero Serra High School	Dana Point, California
34	RHP	Kyle Molnar (redshirt)	R/R	6 ft 3 in (1.91 m)	211 lb (96 kg)	RS So	Aliso Niguel High School	Aliso Viejo, California
35	RHP	Kyle Mora	R/R	6 ft 3 in (1.91 m)	190 lb (86 kg)	So	Los Alamitos High School	Los Alamitos, California
36	OF	Jake Pries	R/R	6 ft 4 in (1.93 m)	210 lb (95 kg)	Jr	Junípero Serra High School	San Juan Capistrano, California
37	INF	Kevin Morden	R/R	5 ft 9 in (1.75 m)	140 lb (64 kg)	Fr	Shadow Hills High School	La Quinta, California
40	RHP	Holden Powell	R/R	6 ft 0 in (1.83 m)	178 lb (81 kg)	Fr	Mount Whitney High School	Visalia, California
41	C	Ty Haselman (redshirt)	R/R	6 ft 2 in (1.88 m)	201 lb (91 kg)	RS Fr	Liberty High School	Newcastle, Washington
44	LHP	Nick Scheidler	L/L	6 ft 3 in (1.91 m)	187 lb (85 kg)	So	La Costa Canyon High School	Encinitas, California
45	RHP	Nathan Hadley (redshirt)	R/R	5 ft 11 in (1.8 m)	181 lb (82 kg)	RS Jr	Loyola High School	Los Angeles, California
47	C	Daniel Rosica (redshirt)	R/R	5 ft 10 in (1.78 m)	167 lb (76 kg)	RS Jr	Fountain Valley High School	Fountain Valley, California

Head coach

John Savage Nevada

Assistant coach(es)

Niko Gallego UCLA

Hitting coach(es)

Bryant Ward East Carolina

Pitching coach(es)

Rex Peters Cal State Fullerton

Legend

- (C) Team captain
- (S) Suspended
- (I) Ineligible
- Injured
- Current redshirt

Roster
Last update: June 9, 2018

== Schedule ==
2018 UCLA Bruins baseball season game log
Regular season

February
Date	Time	Opponent	Rank	Site stadium	Score	Win	Loss	Save	Attendance	Overall record (Pac-12 Record)
February 16	6:00 p.m.	Portland	No. 14	Jackie Robinson Stadium; Los Angeles, California	7–2	**Bird** **(1–0)**	Horak (0–1)	—	877	1–0 (0–0)
February 17	2:00 p.m.	Portland	No. 14	Jackie Robinson Stadium; Los Angeles, California	13–0	**Olsen** **(1–0)**	Powers (0–1)	—	949	2–0 (0–0)
February 18	1:00 p.m.	Portland	No. 14	Jackie Robinson Stadium; Los Angeles, California	15–3	**Pettway** **(1–0)**	Morse (0–1)	—	1,335	3–0 (0–0)
February 20	6:00 p.m.	Pepperdine	No. 11	Jackie Robinson Stadium; Los Angeles, California	2–1	**Gadsby** **(1–0)**	Qsar (0–1)	—	626	4–0 (0–0)
February 23	6:00 p.m.	Baylor	No. 11	Jackie Robinson Stadium; Los Angeles, California	5–2	**Gadsby** **(2–0)**	Ashkinos (0–1)	**Powell (1)**	801	5–0 (0–0)
February 24	2:00 p.m.	Baylor	No. 11	Jackie Robinson Stadium; Los Angeles, California	6–8	Robertson (1–0)	**Mora** **(0–1)**	Montemayor (3)	991	5–1 (0–0)
February 25	1:00 p.m.	Baylor	No. 11	Jackie Robinson Stadium; Los Angeles, California	3–0	**Pettway** **(2–0)**	Kettler (1–1)	**Powell (2)**	953	6–1 (0–0)
February 27	6:00 p.m.	CSU Fullerton	No. 9	Goodwin Field; Fullerton, California	12–2	**Garcia** **(1–0)**	Velasquez (0–2)	**Gadsby (1)**	1,543	7–1 (0–0)

March
Date	Time	Opponent	Rank	Site stadium	Score	Win	Loss	Save	Attendance	Overall record (Pac-12 Record)
March 2	9:00 a.m.	Illinois; Big Ten–Pac-12 Challenge	No. 9	U.S. Bank Stadium; Minneapolis, Minnesota,	3–5	Thompson (1–0)	**Gadsby** **(2–1)**	Gerber (2)	1,481	7–2 (0–0)
March 3	9:00 a.m.	Michigan State; Big Ten–Pac-12 Challenge	No. 9	U.S. Bank Stadium; Minneapolis, Minnesota	4–1	**Olsen** **(2–0)**	Landon (0–2)	—	2,702	8–2 (0–0)
March 4	4:00 p.m.	Minnesota; Big Ten–Pac-12 Challenge	No. 9	U.S. Bank Stadium; Minneapolis, Minnesota	6–1	**Pettway** **(3–0)**	Stevenson (0–1)	—	1,143	9–2 (0–0)
March 6	6:00 p.m.	Loyola Marymount	No. 11	Jackie Robinson Stadium; Los Angeles, California	12–1	**Garcia** **(2–0)**	Christian (0–1)	—	717	10–2 (0–0)
March 9	6:00 p.m.	No. 10 Vanderbilt; Dodger Stadium Classic	No. 11	Jackie Robinson Stadium; Los Angeles, California	3–6	Fellows (2–0)	**Bird** **(1–1)**	Brown (1)	1,215	10–3 (0–0)
March 11	3:00 p.m. P12N	USC; Dodger Stadium Classic/Rivalry	No. 11	Dodger Stadium; Los Angeles, California	2–3	Lunn (1–1)	**Barker** **(0–1)**	—	9,346	10–4 (0–0)
March 16	3:00 p.m.	Washington State	No. 14	Jackie Robinson Stadium; Los Angeles, California	6–5	**Bird** **(2–1)**	Block (0–2)	**Mora (1)**	446	11–4 (1–0)
March 17	2:00 p.m.	Washington State	No. 14	Jackie Robinson Stadium; Los Angeles, California	8–5	**Powell** **(1–0)**	Walker (1–1)	**Mora (2)**	743	12–4 (2–0)
March 18	1:00 p.m.	Washington State	No. 14	Jackie Robinson Stadium; Los Angeles, California	5–4	**Powell** **(2–0)**	Walker (1–2)	—	1,049	13–4 (3–0)
March 23	7:00 p.m. P12N	Arizona State	No. 6	Jackie Robinson Stadium; Los Angeles, California	5–4^{10}	**Mora** **(1–1)**	Montoya (0–2)	—	717	14–4 (4–0)
March 24	1:00 p.m. P12N	Arizona State	No. 6	Jackie Robinson Stadium; Los Angeles, California	12–1	**Pettway** **(4–0)**	Vander (3–2)	—	906	15–4 (5–0)
March 25	12:00 p.m. P12N	Arizona State	No. 6	Jackie Robinson Stadium; Los Angeles, California	0–4	Lingoes (4–1)	**Ralston** **(0–1)**	—	1,302	15–5 (5–1)
March 29	7:05 p.m.	California; Rivalry	No. 5	Evans Diamond; Berkeley, California	2–5	Ladrech (3–3)	**Bird** **(2–2)**	Dodson (5)	571	15–6 (5–2)
March 30	6:05 p.m.	California; Rivalry	No. 5	Evans Diamond; Berkeley, California	4–2	**Pettway** **(5–0)**	Horn (3–3)	**Powell (3)**	708	16–6 (6–2)
March 31	2:05 p.m.	California; Rivalry	No. 5	Evans Diamond; Berkeley, California	3–8	Dodson (1–0)	**Hadley** **(0–1)**	—	905	16–7 (6–3)

April
Date	Time	Opponent	Rank	Site stadium	Score	Win	Loss	Save	Attendance	Overall record (Pac-12 Record)
April 3	6:00 p.m.	Loyola Marymount	No. 10	George C. Page Stadium; Los Angeles, California	13–1	**Mora** **(2–1)**	Fernandezees (0–2)	—	589	17–7 (6–3)
April 6	6:00 p.m.	No. 2 Stanford	No. 10	Jackie Robinson Stadium; Los Angeles, California	8–4	**Bird** **(3–3)**	Beck (3–2)	—	1,314	18–7 (7–3)
April 7	2:00 p.m.	No. 2 Stanford	No. 10	Jackie Robinson Stadium; Los Angeles, California	11–13	Weiermiller (5–1)	**Pettway** **(5–1)**	Little (10)	1,358	18–8 (7–4)
April 8	1:00 p.m.	No. 2 Stanford	No. 10	Jackie Robinson Stadium; Los Angeles, California	7–2	**Garcia** **(3–0)**	Miller (1–2)	—	1,261	19–8 (8–4)
April 10	6:00 p.m.	Long Beach State	No. 5	Blair Field; Long Beach, California	2–5	Hughey (1–0)	**Ralston** **(0–2)**	Rivera (9)	2,149	19–9 (8–4)
April 13	5:00 p.m.	Utah	No. 5	Smith's Ballpark; Salt Lake City, Utah	16–3	**Bird** **(4–2)**	Tedeschi (0–7)	—	2,082	20–9 (9–4)
April 14	12:00 p.m.	Utah	No. 5	Smith's Ballpark; Salt Lake City, Utah	6–3	**Molnar** **(1–0)**	Stoltz (1–2)	**Powell (4)**	2,330	21–9 (10–4)
April 15	12:00 p.m.	Utah	No. 5	Smith's Ballpark; Salt Lake City, Utah	12–4	**Mora** **(3–1)**	Brocoff (2–5)	—	2,283	22–9 (11–4)
April 17	6:00 p.m.	UC Irvine	No. 4	Jackie Robinson Stadium; Los Angeles, California	1–8	Lachemann (2–0)	**Ralston** **(0–3)**	—	526	22–10 (11–4)
April 20	7:00 p.m. P12N	USC; Rivalry	No. 4	Jackie Robinson Stadium; Los Angeles, California	16–1	**Bird** **(5–2)**	Hurt (2–4)	—	1,817	23–10 (12–4)
April 21	4:00 p.m. P12N	USC; Rivalry	No. 4	Jackie Robinson Stadium; Los Angeles, California	19–2	**Pettway** **(6–1)**	Bates (3–2)	—	1,658	24–10 (13–4)
April 22	12:00 p.m. P12N	USC; Rivalry	No. 4	Jackie Robinson Stadium; Los Angeles, California	7–3	**Garcia** **(4–0)**	Longrie (4–3)	—	1,540	25–10 (14–4)
April 24	6:00 p.m.	CSU Fullerton	No. 4	Jackie Robinson Stadium; Los Angeles, California	12–4	**Mora** **(4–1)**	Bibee (2–4)	—	777	26–10 (14–4)
April 27	6:00 p.m.	Cal Poly	No. 4	Robin Baggett Stadium; San Luis Obispo, California	9–5	**Mora** **(5–1)**	Alvarez (2–1)	—	1,375	27–10 (14–4)
April 28	6:00 p.m.	Cal Poly	No. 4	Robin Baggett Stadium; San Luis Obispo, California	6–3	**Pettway** **(7–1)**	Nelson (4–4)	**Powell (5)**	1,642	28–10 (14–4)
April 29	1:00 p.m.	Cal Poly	No. 4	Robin Baggett Stadium; San Luis Obispo, California	6–4	**Garcia** **(5–0)**	Clark (3–4)	**Powell (6)**	1,931	29–10 (14–4)

May
Date	Time	Opponent	Rank	Site stadium	Score	Win	Loss	Save	Attendance	Overall record (Pac-12 Record)
May 1	6:30 p.m.	UC Irvine	No. 3	Anteater Ballpark; Irvine, California	12–0	**Scheidler** **(1–0)**	Lachemann (2–1)	—	533	30–10 (14–4)
May 3	6:00 p.m. P12N	Arizona; Rivalry	No. 3	Hi Corbett Field; Tucson, Arizona	0–2	Deason (5–4)	**Bird** **(5–3)**	—	2,284	30–11 (14–5)
May 4	7:00 p.m. P12N	Arizona; Rivalry	No. 3	Hi Corbett Field; Tucson, Arizona	1–3	Flynn (6–3)	**Pettway** **(7–2)**	Stone (1)	6,014	30–12 (14–6)
May 5	3:30 p.m. P12N	Arizona; Rivalry	No. 3	Hi Corbett Field; Tucson, Arizona	3–6	Aguilera (6–0)	**Garcia** **(5–1)**	—	2,358	30–13 (14–7)
May 8	6:00 p.m. P12N	Long Beach State	No. 8	Jackie Robinson Stadium; Los Angeles, California	1–5	Radcliffe (2–4)	**Ralston** **(0–4)**	Spacke (3)	680	30–14 (14–7)
May 11	6:05 p.m.	Washington	No. 8	Husky Ballpark; Seattle, Washington	7–3	**Bird** **(6–3)**	Knowles (3–5)	—	801	31–14 (15–7)
May 12	2:05 p.m.	Washington	No. 8	Husky Ballpark; Seattle, Washington	6–13	DeMers (5–3)	**Pettway** **(7–3)**	—	1,222	31–15 (15–8)
May 13	1:05 p.m.	Washington	No. 8	Husky Ballpark; Seattle, Washington	4–6^{11}	Emanuels (6–2)	**Powell** **(2–1)**	—	750	31–16 (15–9)
May 15	2:00 p.m.	CSU Northridge		Jackie Robinson Stadium; Los Angeles, California	3–4^{13}	Vanderford (5–2)	**Mora** **(5–2)**	—	200	31–17 (15–9)
May 15	6:00 p.m.	CSU Northridge		Jackie Robinson Stadium; Los Angeles, California	15–2	**Ralston** **(1–4)**	Weston (0–2)	—	553	32–17 (15–9)
May 18	4:00 p.m. P12N	Oregon		Jackie Robinson Stadium; Los Angeles, California	12–4	**Bird** **(7–3)**	Yovan (5–4)	—	796	33–17 (16–9)
May 19	1:30 p.m. P12N	Oregon		Jackie Robinson Stadium; Los Angeles, California	15–1	**Pettway** **(8–3)**	Mercer (5–6)	—	1,907	34–17 (17–9)
May 20	12:00 p.m. P12N	Oregon		Jackie Robinson Stadium; Los Angeles, California	10–2	**Garcia** **(6–1)**	Somers (2–7)	—	1,689	35–17 (18–9)
May 24	4:00 p.m. P12N	No. 3 Oregon State	No. 21	Goss Stadium; Corvallis, Oregon	0–2	Heimlich (15–1)	**Bird** **(7–4)**	Eisert (5)	3,567	35–18 (18–10)
May 25	4:00 p.m. P12N	No. 3 Oregon State	No. 21	Goss Stadium; Corvallis, Oregon	1–4	Fehmel (9–1)	**Pettway** **(8–4)**	Abel (1)	3,756	35–19 (18–11)
May 26	2:02 p.m. ESPNU	No. 3 Oregon State	No. 21	Goss Stadium; Corvallis, Oregon	4–1	**Garcia** **(7–1)**	Burns (1–1)	**Mora (3)**	3,831	36–19 (19–11)

Postseason

NCAA tournament – Minneapolis Regional
Date	Time	Opponent	Rank	Site stadium	Score	Win	Loss	Save	Attendance	Overall record
June 1	11:00 a.m. ESPN3	(3) Gonzaga; Quarterfinals	(2) No. 23	Siebert Field; Minneapolis, Minnesota	6–5	**Mora** **(6–2)**	Legumina (3–3)	—	1,267	37–19
June 2	5:00 p.m. ESPN3	(1) No. 14 Minnesota; Semifinals	(2) No. 23	Siebert Field; Minneapolis, Minnesota	2–3^{10}	Meyer (2–2)	**Mora** **(6–3)**	—	2,288	37–20
June 3	12:00 p.m. ESPN3	(3) Gonzaga; Consolation	(2) No. 23	Siebert Field; Minneapolis, Minnesota	10–4	**Garcia** **(8–1)**	Lardner (7–4)	—	1,299	38–20
June 3	4:00 p.m. ESPN3	(1) No. 14 Minnesota; Championship	(2) No. 23	Siebert Field; Minneapolis, Minnesota	8–13	Rose (5–1)	Scheidler (1–1)	—	2,425	38–21

- Bruins win
- Bruins loss
- Bold: Bruins team member
- Source: UCLA
- Rankings from Collegiate Baseball.
- (#) Tournament seedings in parentheses.
- All times are in Pacific Time.
