= 2018 Cal State Fullerton Titans baseball team =

College baseball team

2018 Cal State Fullerton Titans baseball

Big West regular season champions Stanford Regional champions

NCAA tournament, Fullerton Super Regional
- Conference: Big West Conference

Ranking
- Coaches: No. 19
- CB: No. 14
- Record: 36–25 (18–6 Big West)
- Head coach: Rick Vanderhook (7th season)
- Hitting coach: Chad Baum (7th season)
- Pitching coach: Steve Rousey (1st season)
- Home stadium: Goodwin Field (Capacity: 3,500)

2018 Big West Conference baseball standings
	Conf.						Overall
Team	W		L		T	PCT	W		L		T	PCT
Cal State Fullerton ‍†‍‍^{y}	18	–	6	–	0	.750	35	–	23	–	0	.603
Cal Poly ‍‍‍	15	–	9	–	0	.625	30	–	27	–	0	.526
UC Irvine ‍‍‍	13	–	11	–	0	.542	32	–	24	–	0	.571
Cal State Northridge ‍‍‍	13	–	11	–	0	.542	28	–	30	–	0	.483
Long Beach State ‍‍‍	12	–	12	–	0	.500	27	–	30	–	0	.474
Hawaii ‍‍‍	11	–	13	–	0	.458	27	–	24	–	0	.529
UC Santa Barbara ‍‍‍	10	–	14	–	0	.417	27	–	28	–	1	.491
UC Davis ‍‍‍	9	–	15	–	0	.375	18	–	35	–	0	.340
UC Riverside ‍‍‍	7	–	17	–	0	.292	19	–	33	–	0	.365
† – Conference champion y – Invited to the NCAA tournament Rankings from Collegiate Baseball

The 2018 Cal State Fullerton Titans baseball team represented California State University, Fullerton in the 2018 NCAA Division I baseball season as a member of the Big West Conference. The team was coached by Rick Vanderhook and played their home games at Goodwin Field.

== Previous season ==
The Titans finished 39–24 overall, and 15–9 in the conference. In the postseason, the Titans were invited and participated in the 2017 NCAA Division I baseball tournament, where they defeated BYU and Stanford twice in Stanford, California, then Long Beach State twice in Long Beach, California, and finally losing to Florida State and Oregon State in the College World Series in Omaha, Nebraska.

=== MLB draft selections ===
The Titans had seven individuals selected in the 2017 MLB draft.

Player	Position	Round	Overall	MLB Team
Connor Seabold	Pitcher	3	83	Philadelphia Phillies
Scott Hurst	Center fielder	3	94	St. Louis Cardinals
John Gavin	Pitcher	8	246	San Francisco Giants
Chris Hudgins	Catcher	16	480	Kansas City Royals
Dillon Persinger	Second baseman	18	552	Cleveland Indians
Tim Richards	Shortstop	24	733	Washington Nationals
Taylor Bryant	Second baseman	33	994	St. Louis Cardinals

== Roster ==
2018 Cal State Fullerton Titans baseball team
Players
Coaches

#	Pos.	Name	B/T	Height	Weight	Year	Previous school	Home town
2	INF	Brett Borgogno	R/R	5 ft 10 in (1.78 m)	155 lb (70 kg)	Fr	Chino Hills High School	Chino Hills, California
3	OF	Chris Prescott	L/R	6 ft 1 in (1.85 m)	180 lb (82 kg)	Sr	Orange Coast College	Anaheim, California
4	INF	Sahid Valenzuela	S/R	5 ft 9 in (1.75 m)	165 lb (75 kg)	So	Saint Francis High School	Yuma, Arizona
5	OF	Ruben Cardenas	R/R	6 ft 2 in (1.88 m)	190 lb (86 kg)	Jr	Bishop Alemany High School	Saugus, California
6	OF	Mitchell Berryhill	L/L	6 ft 0 in (1.83 m)	170 lb (77 kg)	Jr	Salt Lake Community College	Smithfield, Utah
8	C	Tyler Lasch	L/R	5 ft 9 in (1.75 m)	170 lb (77 kg)	Fr	El Toro High School	Lake Forest, California
9	INF	Hank LoForte	L/R	5 ft 6 in (1.68 m)	175 lb (79 kg)	Jr	Franklin High School	Elk Grove, California
10	C	Daniel Cope	R/R	6 ft 0 in (1.83 m)	195 lb (88 kg)	So	Mount Carmel High School	San Diego, California
12	OF	Cody Minnis	S/R	6 ft 2 in (1.88 m)	175 lb (79 kg)	Fr	Valencia High School	Valencia, California
13	LHP	Timothy Josten	L/L	5 ft 11 in (1.8 m)	170 lb (77 kg)	Fr	West Ranch High School	Santa Clarita, California
15	RHP	Evan Larsen (redshirt)	R/R	6 ft 4 in (1.93 m)	220 lb (100 kg)	RS Fr	Corona del Mar High School	Costa Mesa, California
17	RHP	Colton Eastman	R/R	6 ft 3 in (1.91 m)	200 lb (91 kg)	Jr	Central High School	Fresno, California
18	RHP	Brett Conine	R/R	6 ft 4 in (1.93 m)	220 lb (100 kg)	Jr	El Modena High School	Orange, California
19	LHP	Tyler Smith	L/L	5 ft 11 in (1.8 m)	170 lb (77 kg)	Fr	Valley Vista High School	Surprise, Arizona
20	RHP	Jimmy Endersby (redshirt)	R/R	6 ft 1 in (1.85 m)	190 lb (86 kg)	RS Fr	Orange High School	Orange, California
22	RHP	Andrew Quezada	L/R	6 ft 1 in (1.85 m)	180 lb (82 kg)	Jr	Cypress College	Bellflower, California
23	INF	Jacob Pavletich (redshirt)	R/R	6 ft 2 in (1.88 m)	205 lb (93 kg)	RS Jr	Garces Memorial High School	Bakersfield, California
24	RHP	Tanner Bibee	R/R	6 ft 2 in (1.88 m)	190 lb (86 kg)	Fr	Mission Viejo High School	Mission Viejo, California
25	LHP	Erik Cha (redshirt)	L/L	6 ft 3 in (1.91 m)	190 lb (86 kg)	RS So	Ayala High School	Chino Hills, California
26	INF	Ryan Williams	L/R	6 ft 0 in (1.83 m)	170 lb (77 kg)	Fr	Santiago High School	Corona, California
27	RHP	Tommy Wilson	R/R	6 ft 4 in (1.93 m)	220 lb (100 kg)	Jr	Los Angeles Pierce College	Los Angeles, California
31	OF	Zach Wiesz (redshirt)	R/R	5 ft 8 in (1.73 m)	165 lb (75 kg)	RS So	La Jolla Country Day School	Poway, California
32	OF	Jairus Richards	L/R	6 ft 0 in (1.83 m)	165 lb (75 kg)	Jr	Cabrillo College	Gig Harbor, Washington
33	OF	Jordan Hernandez	L/L	5 ft 11 in (1.8 m)	195 lb (88 kg)	Jr	Chaffey College	Chino Hills, California
34	RHP	Joe Wills	R/R	6 ft 2 in (1.88 m)	195 lb (88 kg)	Sr	Rio Hondo College	Covina, California
35	INF	Zach Weller	R/R	6 ft 2 in (1.88 m)	205 lb (93 kg)	So	Coronado High School	Coronado, California
37	RHP	Dillon Brown	R/R	6 ft 3 in (1.91 m)	210 lb (95 kg)	So	Foothill High School	Santa Ana, California
38	C	Nick Ciandro	R/R	6 ft 0 in (1.83 m)	200 lb (91 kg)	Jr	Cabrillo College	Seaside, California
39	INF	Jacob Dominguez	R/R	6 ft 1 in (1.85 m)	185 lb (84 kg)	Fr	South Hills High School	West Covina, California
41	LHP	Landon Anderson	L/L	6 ft 4 in (1.93 m)	178 lb (81 kg)	Fr	Mayfair High School	Lakewood, California
42	RHP	Gavin Velasquez	R/R	6 ft 3 in (1.91 m)	195 lb (88 kg)	Jr	South Hills High School	Covina, California
45	RHP	Brandon Moore	R/R	6 ft 2 in (1.88 m)	235 lb (107 kg)	Jr	Rio Hondo College	Whittier, California
46	INF	Max Miller	R/R	6 ft 2 in (1.88 m)	173 lb (78 kg)	Fr	Yorba Linda High School	Yorba Linda, California
50	INF	Jace Chamberlain	L/R	6 ft 4 in (1.93 m)	240 lb (109 kg)	Jr	Redwood High School	Visalia, California
55	RHP	Blake Workman	R/R	6 ft 3 in (1.91 m)	195 lb (88 kg)	Jr	Ramona High School	Ramona, California

Head coach

Rick Vanderhook Trinity

Assistant coach(es)

Neil Walton Cal State Fullerton

Hitting coach(es)

Chad Baum Azusa Pacific

Pitching coach(es)

Steve Rousey Azusa Pacific

Legend

- (C) Team captain
- (S) Suspended
- (I) Ineligible
- Injured
- Current redshirt

Roster
Last update: June 11, 2018

== Schedule ==
2018 Cal State Fullerton Titans baseball season game log
Regular season

February
Date	Time	Opponent	Rank	Site stadium	Score	Win	Loss	Save	Attendance	Overall record (Big West record)
February 16	6:00 p.m.	No. 24 Stanford	No. 12	Klein Field; Stanford, California	1–5	Beck (1–0)	**Eastman** **(0–1)**	—	1,507	0–1 (0–0)
February 17	1:00 p.m.	No. 24 Stanford	No. 12	Klein Field; Stanford, California	3–5	Bubic (1–0)	**Quezada** **(0–1)**	Little (1)	1,984	0–2 (0–0)
February 18	1:00 p.m.	No. 24 Stanford	No. 12	Klein Field; Stanford, California	5–6	Weiermiller (1–0)	**Bibee** **(0–1)**	Stowers (1)	1,311	0–3 (0–0)
February 20	6:00 p.m.	Nevada		Goodwin Field; Fullerton, California	0–2	Gomez (1–0)	**Velasquez** **(0–1)**	Anderson (2)	1,148	0–4 (0–0)
February 23	7:03 p.m.	Houston		Goodwin Field; Fullerton, California	2–1^{15}	**Wilson** **(1–0)**	Hurdsman (0–1)	—	1,664	1–4 (0–0)
February 24	4:00 p.m.	Houston		Goodwin Field; Fullerton, California	4–9	Fletcher (2–0)	**Quezada** **(0–2)**	—	1,579	1–5 (0–0)
February 25	12:00 p.m.	Houston		Goodwin Field; Fullerton, California	5–10	Randel (1–0)	**Workman** **(0–1)**	—	1,495	1–6 (0–0)
February 27	6:00 p.m.	No. 9 UCLA		Goodwin Field; Fullerton, California	2–12	Garcia (1–0)	**Velasquez** **(0–2)**	Gadsby (1)	1,543	1–7 (0–0)

March
Date	Time	Opponent	Rank	Site stadium	Score	Win	Loss	Save	Attendance	Overall record (Big West record)
March 2	4:30 p.m.	Tulane		Greer Field; New Orleans, Louisiana,	9–3	**Eastman** **(1–1)**	Roper (0–2)	—	1,991	2–7 (0–0)
March 3	12:00 p.m.	Tulane		Greer Field; New Orleans, Louisiana	9–6	**Brown** **(1–0)**	McAffer (0–1)	**Conine (1)**	1,952	3–7 (0–0)
March 4	11:00 a.m.	Tulane		Greer Field; New Orleans, Louisiana	3–9	Gillies (1–1)	**Workman** **(0–2)**	—	1,905	3–8 (0–0)
March 9	5:35 p.m.	No. 1 Oregon State		Goss Stadium; Corvallis, Oregon	5–3	**Wilson** **(2–0)**	Eisert (2–1)	**Conine (2)**	3,326	4–8 (0–0)
March 10	1:05 p.m. P12N	No. 1 Oregon State		Goss Stadium; Corvallis, Oregon	4–6	Pearce (1–0)	**Bibee** **(0–2)**	Mulholland (5)	3,608	4–9 (0–0)
March 11	12:05 p.m. P12N	No. 1 Oregon State		Goss Stadium; Corvallis, Oregon	4–5	Chamberlain (2–0)	**Workman** **(0–3)**	Mulholland (6)	3,542	4–10 (0–0)
March 16	7:00 p.m.	Grand Canyon		Goodwin Field; Fullerton, California	7–3	**Eastman** **(2–1)**	Wong (2–1)	**Endersby (1)**	1,569	5–10 (0–0)
March 17	6:00 p.m.	Grand Canyon		Goodwin Field; Fullerton, California	10–2	**Wilson** **(3–0)**	Lundin (1–3)	—	1,503	6–10 (0–0)
March 18	1:00 p.m.	Grand Canyon		Goodwin Field; Fullerton, California	2–0	**Workman** **(1–3)**	Repavich (0–2)	**Conine (3)**	1,652	7–10 (0–0)
March 20	6:04 p.m.	San Diego		Goodwin Field; Fullerton, California	9–3	**Wills** **(1–0)**	Kuchta (0–1)	—	1,112	8–10 (0–0)
March 23	7:00 p.m.	Long Beach State		Goodwin Field; Fullerton, California	2–5	Baayoun (4–2)	**Eastman** **(2–2)**	Rivera (6)	2,503	8–11 (0–0)
March 24	6:00 p.m.	Long Beach State		Goodwin Field; Fullerton, California	2–1	**Workman** **(2–3)**	Radcliffe (1–3)	—	2,222	9–11 (0–0)
March 25	1:00 p.m.	Long Beach State		Goodwin Field; Fullerton, California	1–3	Andrews (2–4)	**Josten** **(0–1)**	Rivera (7)	1,827	9–12 (0–0)
March 27	6:04 p.m.	USC		Goodwin Field; Fullerton, California	1–3	Manning (1–1)	**Bibee** **(0–3)**	Lunn (7)	1,601	9–13 (0–0)
March 29	3:00 p.m.	UC Santa Barbara		Caesar Uyesaka Stadium; Santa Barbara, California	3–0	**Eastman** **(3–2)**	Dashwood (1–4)	—	340	10–13 (1–0)
March 30	3:00 p.m.	UC Santa Barbara		Caesar Uyesaka Stadium; Santa Barbara, California	5–6	Barry (2–0)	**Workman** **(2–4)**	—	425	10–14 (1–1)
March 31	2:00 p.m.	UC Santa Barbara		Caesar Uyesaka Stadium; Santa Barbara, California	1–2	Ledesma (2–1)	**Quezada** **(0–3)**	Barry (1)	600	10–15 (1–2)

April
Date	Time	Opponent	Rank	Site stadium	Score	Win	Loss	Save	Attendance	Overall record (Big West record)
April 3	6:35 p.m. P12N	Arizona State		Phoenix Municipal Stadium; Phoenix, Arizona	7–6	**Bibee** **(1–3)**	Montoya (0–4)	**Conine (4)**	2,289	11–15 (1–2)
April 4	6:35 p.m. P12N	Arizona State		Phoenix Municipal Stadium; Phoenix, Arizona	2–1	**Workman** **(3–4)**	Montoya (0–5)	**Conine (5)**	2,199	12–15 (1–2)
April 6	7:03 p.m.	Cal Poly		Goodwin Field; Fullerton, California	5–1	**Eastman** **(4–2)**	Zill (0–1)	—	1,982	13–15 (2–2)
April 7	2:00 p.m.	Cal Poly		Goodwin Field; Fullerton, California	5–4	**Workman** **(4–4)**	Schneider (3–2)	**Conine (6)**	1,589	14–15 (3–2)
April 8	1:00 p.m.	Cal Poly		Goodwin Field; Fullerton, California	6–3	**Quezada** **(1–3)**	Nelson (3–3)	**Conine (7)**	1,665	15–15 (4–2)
April 10	6:01 p.m.	Pepperdine		Goodwin Field; Fullerton, California	3–2	**Bibee** **(2–3)**	Easton (0–3)	**Workman (1)**	1,459	16–15 (4–2)
April 13	6:00 p.m.	San Diego State		Tony Gwynn Stadium; San Diego, California	3–6	Erickson (3–2)	**Eastman** **(4–3)**	Schmitt (2)	681	16–16 (4–2)
April 14	6:00 p.m.	San Diego State		Tony Gwynn Stadium; San Diego, California	13–9	**Conine** **(1–0)**	Mardueno (4–1)	—	1,203	17–16 (4–2)
April 15	1:00 p.m.	San Diego State		Tony Gwynn Stadium; San Diego, California	6–9	Winston (1–0)	**Quezada** **(1–4)**	Schmitt (3)	1,203	17–17 (4–2)
April 17	6:00 p.m.	San Diego		Fowler Park; San Diego, California	4–10	Donatella (2–3)	**Brown** **(1–1)**	—	678	17–18 (4–2)
April 20	7:00 p.m.	Hawaii		Goodwin Field; Fullerton, California	6–3	**Eastman** **(5–3)**	Rees (3–1)	**Conine (8)**	1,918	18–18 (5–2)
April 21	6:00 p.m.	Hawaii		Goodwin Field; Fullerton, California	4–6^{10}	Thomas (2–1)	**Brown** **(1–2)**	—	1,718	18–19 (5–3)
April 22	1:00 p.m.	Hawaii		Goodwin Field; Fullerton, California	8–0	**Quezada** **(2–4)**	DeMiero (2–4)	—	1,413	19–19 (6–3)
April 24	6:00 p.m.	No. 4 UCLA		Jackie Robinson Stadium; Los Angeles, California	4–12	Mora (4–1)	**Bibee** **(2–4)**	—	777	19–20 (6–3)
April 27	6:30 p.m.	No. 29 UC Irvine		Anteater Ballpark; Irvine, California	8–3	**Eastman** **(6–3)**	Pallante (6–1)	—	1,029	20–20 (7–3)
April 28	2:00 p.m.	No. 29 UC Irvine		Anteater Ballpark; Irvine, California	5–3	**Conine** **(2–0)**	Bocko (3–2)	—	659	21–20 (8–3)
April 29	1:00 p.m.	No. 29 UC Irvine		Anteater Ballpark; Irvine, California	7–6^{11}	**Conine** **(3–0)**	Sparling (0–1)	—	744	22–20 (9–3)

May
Date	Time	Opponent	Rank	Site stadium	Score	Win	Loss	Save	Attendance	Overall record (Big West record)
May 4	2:31 p.m.	UC Davis		Dobbins Baseball Complex; Davis, California	5–4	**Eastman** **(7–3)**	Blais (3–6)	**Workman (2)**	259	23–20 (10–3)
May 5	1:01 p.m.	UC Davis		Dobbins Baseball Complex; Davis, California	5–0	**Wilson** **(4–0)**	Sasaki (3–5)	**Workman (3)**	275	24–20 (11–3)
May 6	1:01 p.m.	UC Davis		Dobbins Baseball Complex; Davis, California	5–0	**Quezada** **(3–4)**	Brown (3–5)	—	224	25–20 (12–3)
May 11	7:00 p.m.	UC Riverside	No. 30	Goodwin Field; Fullerton, California	3–2	**Eastman** **(8–3)**	Percival (5–4)	**Workman (4)**	1,848	26–20 (13–3)
May 12	6:00 p.m.	UC Riverside	No. 30	Goodwin Field; Fullerton, California	10–6	**Wilson** **(5–0)**	Morton (2–4)	—	1,857	27–20 (14–3)
May 12	1:00 p.m.	UC Riverside	No. 30	Goodwin Field; Fullerton, California	2–4	Toplikar (5–3)	**Quezada** **(3–5)**	Quijada (4)	1,158	27–21 (14–4)
May 17	6:04 p.m. ESPN3	CSU Northridge	No. 30	Goodwin Field; Fullerton, California	3–6^{14}	Vanderford (6–2)	**Conine** **(3–1)**	—	1,116	27–22 (14–5)
May 18	1:04 p.m. ESPN3	CSU Northridge	No. 30	Goodwin Field; Fullerton, California	3–0	**Wilson** **(6–0)**	Nunez (1–2)	**Conine (9)**	1,179	28–22 (15–5)
May 19	1:05 p.m.	CSU Northridge	No. 30	Goodwin Field; Fullerton, California	11–4	**Quezada** **(4–5)**	Acosta (5–6)	—	1,464	29–22 (16–5)
May 22	6:05 p.m. P12N	USC		Dedeaux Field; Los Angeles, California	4–3	**Cha** **(1–0)**	Clarke (2–7)	**Conine (10)**	278	30–22 (16–5)
May 24	5:03 p.m. ESPNU	Long Beach State		Blair Field; Long Beach, California	9–3	**Eastman** **(9–3)**	Baayoun (9–3)	—	2,052	31–22 (17–5)
May 25	6:01 p.m.	Long Beach State		Blair Field; Long Beach, California	0–1	Andrews (7–7)	**Bibee** **(2–5)**	—	2,762	31–23 (17–6)
May 26	2:08 p.m. FSN	Long Beach State		Blair Field; Long Beach, California	10–9	**Anderson** **(1–0)**	Seminaris (1–7)	—	3,015	32–23 (18–6)

Postseason

NCAA tournament – Stanford Regional
Date	Time	Opponent	Rank	Site stadium	Score	Win	Loss	Save	Attendance	Overall record
June 1	2:05 p.m. ESPN3	(2) No. 25 Baylor; Quarterfinals	(3) No. 28	Klein Field; Stanford, California	6–2	**Eastman** **(10–3)**	Bradford (7–6)	**Workman (5)**	1,284	33–23
June 2	8:04 p.m. ESPNU	(1) No. 3 Stanford; Semifinals	(3) No. 28	Klein Field; Stanford, California	2–1	**Conine** **(4–1)**	Matthiessen (2–1)	—	1,967	34–23
June 3	6:04 p.m. ESPN3	(1) No. 3 Stanford; Championship	(3) No. 28	Klein Field; Stanford, California	5–2	**Bibee** **(3–5)**	Miller (4–4)	—	2,269	35–23

NCAA tournament – Fullerton Super Regional
Date	Time	Opponent	Rank	Site stadium	Score	Win	Loss	Save	Attendance	Overall record
June 8	11:04 a.m. ESPN2	(2) No. 13 Washington; Round one	(1) No. 12	Goodwin Field; Fullerton, California	5–8	Knowles (6–5)	**Eastman** **(10–4)**	DeMers (3)	3,469	35–24
June 9	3:34 p.m. ESPNU	(2) No. 13 Washington; Round two	(1) No. 12	Goodwin Field; Fullerton, California	5–2	**Wilson** **(7–0)**	Jones (6–4)	—	3,508	36–24
June 10	6:04 p.m. ESPN2	(2) No. 13 Washington; Round three	(1) No. 12	Goodwin Field; Fullerton, California	5–6^{10}	Hardy (5–2)	**Conine** **(4–2)**	—	3,477	36–25

- Titans win
- Titans loss
- Bold: Titans team member
- Source: Cal State Fullerton
- Rankings from Collegiate Baseball.
- (#) Tournament seedings in parentheses.
- All times are in Pacific Time.
