= 2018 NCAA Division I baseball tournament =

American college sports championship

- Season: 2018
- Teams: 64
- Finals site: TD Ameritrade Park; Omaha, Nebraska
- Champions: Oregon State Beavers (3rd title)
- Runner-up: Arkansas Razorbacks (9th CWS Appearance)
- Winning coach: Pat Casey (3rd title)
- MOP: Adley Rutschman (Oregon State)
- Television: ESPN

The 2018 NCAA Division I baseball tournament began on Friday, June 1, 2018, as part of the 2018 NCAA Division I baseball season. The 64-team, double-elimination tournament concluded with the 2018 College World Series in Omaha, Nebraska, starting on June 16 and ended on June 28. The Oregon State Beavers defeated the Arkansas Razorbacks in the best-of-three final series to win the championship.

The 64 participating NCAA Division I college baseball teams were selected out of an eligible 298 teams. Thirty-one teams will be awarded an automatic bid as champions of their conferences, and 33 teams will be selected at-large by the NCAA Division I Baseball Committee.

Teams were divided into sixteen regionals of four teams, which conducted a double-elimination tournament. Regional champions competed in Super Regionals, a best-of-three-game series, to determine the eight participants in the College World Series. For the first time, the Tournament seeded the top 16 teams instead of pairing teams generally along geographical lines.

In the championship series, Arkansas won the first game and held a 3–2 lead entering the top of the ninth inning in game 2. With two outs and a runner on third, Oregon State shortstop Cadyn Grenier popped a foul ball down the right field line that multiple Razorback players appeared to have a play on. Had the ball been caught, Arkansas would have won their first national championship in baseball; instead, the ball dropped between the first baseman, second baseman, and right fielder to continue the at-bat. Three pitches later, with the Beavers down to their final strike, Grenier singled in the tying run, and was followed by Trevor Larnach's two-run homer to give OSU a 5–3 lead and the eventual victory to even the series. The following day, Oregon State freshman Kevin Abel – who threw 23 pitches the previous night – notched a 129-pitch complete game shutout, allowing just two hits and retiring the final 20 Razorback hitters to secure the Beavers' third national title in baseball. Oregon State catcher Adley Rutschman was named College World Series Most Outstanding Player after collecting 13 RBI's and a College World Series record 17 hits.

== Bids ==
=== Automatic bids ===
School	Conference	Record (Conf)	Berth	Last NCAA appearance
Hartford	America East	26–29 (17–8)	Tournament	First Appearance
East Carolina	American	43–16 (15–10)	Tournament	2016 (Lubbock Super Regional)
Florida State	ACC	43–17 (16–13)	Tournament	2017 (College World Series)
Stetson	Atlantic Sun	45–11 (15–3)	Tournament	2016 (Coral Gables Regional)
Saint Louis	Atlantic 10	38–18 (20–4)	Tournament	2013 (Columbia Regional)
Baylor	Big 12	36–19 (14–11)	Tournament	2017 (Houston Regional)
St. John's	Big East	39–15 (15–3)	Tournament	2017 (Clemson Regional)
Campbell	Big South	35–24 (22–6)	Tournament	2014 (Columbia Regional)
Minnesota	Big Ten	40–13 (18–4)	Tournament	2016 (College Station Regional)
Cal State Fullerton	Big West	32–23 (18–6)	Regular season	2017 (College World Series)
UNC Wilmington	Colonial	37–21 (14–9)	Tournament	2016 (Columbia Regional)
Southern Miss	Conference USA	43–16 (23–6)	Tournament	2017 (Hattiesburg Regional)
Wright State	Horizon	39–15 (23–6)	Tournament	2016 (Louisville Regional)
Columbia	Ivy League	20–27 (13–8)	Championship series	2015 (Coral Gables Regional)
Canisius	Metro Atlantic	35–20 (16–8)	Tournament	2015 (Springfield Regional)
Kent State	Mid-American	39–16 (19–8)	Tournament	2014 (Louisville Regional)
North Carolina A&T	Mid-Eastern	32–23 (16–8)	Tournament	2005 (Clemson Regional)
Missouri State	Missouri Valley	39–15 (18–3)	Tournament	2017 (Fort Worth Super Regional)
San Diego State	Mountain West	39–19 (19–12)	Tournament	2017 (Long Beach Regional)
LIU Brooklyn	Northeast	31–24 (16–12)	Tournament	1972 (Princeton District)
Morehead State	Ohio Valley	37–24 (20–12)	Tournament	2015 (Louisville Regional)
Stanford	Pac-12	44–10 (22–8)	Regular season	2017 (Palo Alto Regional)
Army	Patriot	35–22 (18–7)	Tournament	2013 (Charlottesville Regional)
Ole Miss	Southeastern	46–15 (18–12)	Tournament	2016 (Oxford Regional)
Samford	Southern	36–24 (16–8)	Tournament	2012 (Tallahassee Regional)
Northwestern State	Southland	37–22 (18–12)	Tournament	2005 (Baton Rouge Regional)
Texas Southern	Southwestern Athletic	27–26 (17–6)	Tournament	2017 (Baton Rouge Regional)
Oral Roberts	Summit	38–18 (24–6)	Tournament	2017 (Fayetteville Regional)
Coastal Carolina	Sun Belt	42–17 (23–7)	Tournament	2016 (National Champions)
Gonzaga	West Coast	32–22 (16–11)	Tournament	2016 (Fort Worth Regional)
New Mexico State	Western Athletic	40–20 (17–7)	Tournament	2012 (Tucson Regional)

=== By conference ===
Conference	Total	Schools
SEC	10	Arkansas, Auburn, Florida, Georgia, South Carolina, Ole Miss, Texas A&M, LSU, Mississippi State, Vanderbilt
ACC	6	NC State, Duke, Louisville, Florida State, Clemson, North Carolina
Big 12	5	Texas Tech, Texas, Oklahoma State, Oklahoma, Baylor
American	4	East Carolina, Houston, South Florida, Connecticut
Big Ten	4	Minnesota, Indiana, Ohio State, Purdue
Pac-12	4	Oregon State, UCLA, Stanford, Washington
Atlantic Sun	2	Stetson, Jacksonville
Colonial	2	Northeastern, UNC Wilmington
Conference USA	2	Southern Miss, Florida Atlantic
Missouri Valley	2	Missouri State, Dallas Baptist
Ohio Valley	2	Tennessee Tech, Morehead State
Sun Belt	2	Coastal Carolina, Troy
America East	1	Hartford
Atlantic 10	1	Saint Louis
Big East	1	St. John's
Big South	1	Campbell
Big West	1	Cal State Fullerton
Horizon	1	Wright State
Ivy	1	Columbia
MAAC	1	Canisius
Mid-American	1	Kent State
MEAC	1	North Carolina A&T
Mountain West	1	San Diego State
NEC	1	LIU Brooklyn
Patriot	1	Army
Southern	1	Samford
Southland	1	Northwestern State
Summit	1	Oral Roberts
SWAC	1	Texas Southern
West Coast	1	Gonzaga
WAC	1	New Mexico State

== National seeds ==
16 National Seeds were announced on the Selection Show Monday, May 28 at 12 p.m. EDT on ESPNU. The 16 national seeds host the Regionals. Teams in italics advanced to Super Regionals. Teams in bold advanced to College World Series.

1. **Florida**
2. Stanford
3. **Oregon State**
4. Ole Miss
5. **Arkansas**
6. **North Carolina**
7. Florida State
8. Georgia

9. **Texas Tech**
10. Clemson
11. Stetson
12. East Carolina
13. **Texas**
14. Minnesota
15. Coastal Carolina
16. NC State

== Regionals and Super Regionals ==
Bold indicates winner. Seeds for regional tournaments indicate seeds within regional. Seeds for super regional tournaments indicate national seeds only.

=== Gainesville Super Regional ===
Regional	Regional
1	**Florida**	**13**
4	Columbia	5
1	**Florida**	**3**
2	Jacksonville	2
3	Florida Atlantic	3
2	**Jacksonville**	**5**
Gainesville Regional – Alfred A. McKethan Stadium
4	Columbia	2
3	**Florida Atlantic**	**11**
3	**Florida Atlantic**	**12**
2	Jacksonville	7
1	NC State	1
4	**Army**	**5**
4	Army	1
2	**Auburn**	**12**
3	Northeastern	4
2	**Auburn**	**13**
Raleigh Regional – Doak Field
1	**NC State**	**9**
3	Northeastern	3
1	**NC State**	**11**
4	Army	1

Regional Final
1	**Florida**	4	**5**
3	Florida Atlantic	**7**	2
2	**Auburn**	**15**	–
1	NC State	7	–

Super Regional
1	**Florida**	**8**	2	**3**
Auburn	2	**3**	2^{11}

=== Lubbock Super Regional ===
Regional	Regional
1	**Georgia**	**18**
4	Campbell	5
1	**Georgia**	**11**
3	Troy	7
3	**Troy**	**6**
2	Duke	0
Athens Regional – Foley Field
4	Campbell	8
2	**Duke**	**16**
2	**Duke**	**15**
3	Troy	6
1	**Texas Tech**	**9**
4	New Mexico State	2
1	**Texas Tech**	**10**
2	Louisville	4
3	Kent State	6
2	**Louisville**	**13**
Lubbock Regional – Dan Law Field at Rip Griffin Park
4	New Mexico State	1
3	**Kent State**	**2**
3	Kent State	6
2	**Louisville**	**12**

Regional Final
1	Georgia	5	4
2	**Duke**	**8**	**8**
1	**Texas Tech**	**11**	–
2	Louisville	6	–

Super Regional
Duke	4	**11**	2
9	**Texas Tech**	**6**	2	**6**

=== Fayetteville Super Regional ===
Regional	Regional
1	**Arkansas**	**10**
4	Oral Roberts	2
1	**Arkansas**	**10**
2	Southern Miss	2
3	Dallas Baptist	0
2	**Southern Miss**	**9**
Fayetteville Regional – Baum Stadium
4	Oral Roberts	9
3	**Dallas Baptist**	**18**
3	**Dallas Baptist**	**9**
2	Southern Miss	4
1	**East Carolina**	**16**
4	UNC Wilmington	7
1	East Carolina	2
2	**South Carolina**	**4**
3	Ohio State	3
2	**South Carolina**	**8**
Greenville Regional – Clark–LeClair Stadium
4	**UNC Wilmington**	**4**
3	Ohio State	3^{13}
4	**UNC Wilmington**	**9**
1	East Carolina	7

Regional Final
1	**Arkansas**	**4**	–
3	Dallas Baptist	3	–
2	**South Carolina**	**8**	–
4	UNC Wilmington	4	–

Super Regional
5	**Arkansas**	**9**	5	**14**
South Carolina	3	**8**	4

=== Austin Super Regional ===
Regional	Regional
1	**Ole Miss**	**9**
4	Saint Louis	2
1	**Ole Miss**	**9**
2	Tennessee Tech	8
3	Missouri State	4
2	**Tennessee Tech**	**6**
Oxford Regional – Swayze Field
4	Saint Louis	8
3	**Missouri State**	9
3	Missouri State	1
2	**Tennessee Tech**	**2**
1	**Texas**	**10**
4	Texas Southern	0
1	**Texas**	**8**
3	Texas A&M	3
3	**Texas A&M**	**10**
2	Indiana	3
Austin Regional – UFCU Disch–Falk Field
4	Texas Southern	0
2	**Indiana**	**6**
2	**Indiana**	**9**
3	Texas A&M	7

Regional Final
1	Ole Miss	5	2
2	**Tennessee Tech**	**15**	**3**
1	**Texas**	**3**	−
2	Indiana	2	−

Super Regional
Tennessee Tech	**5**	2	2
13	**Texas**	4	**4**	**5**

=== Corvallis Super Regional ===
Regional	Regional
1	**Oregon State**	**9**
4	Northwestern State	3
1	**Oregon State**	**14**
2	LSU	1
3	San Diego State	4
2	**LSU**	**6**
Corvallis Regional – Goss Stadium at Coleman Field
4	**Northwestern State**	**9**
3	San Diego State	0
4	Northwestern State	5
2	**LSU**	**9**
1	**Minnesota**	**10**
4	Canisius	1
1	**Minnesota**	**3**
2	UCLA	2^{10}
3	Gonzaga	5
2	**UCLA**	**6**
Minneapolis Regional – Siebert Field
4	Canisius	2
3	**Gonzaga**	**8**
3	Gonzaga	4
2	**UCLA**	**10**

Regional Final
1	**Oregon State**	**12**	−
2	LSU	0	−
1	**Minnesota**	**13**	−
2	UCLA	8	−

Super Regional
3	**Oregon State**	**8**	**6**	–
14	Minnesota	1	3	–

=== Chapel Hill Super Regional ===
Regional	Regional
1	**North Carolina**	**11**
4	North Carolina A&T	0
1	**North Carolina**	**4**
3	Houston	3
3	**Houston**	**9**
2	Purdue	1
Chapel Hill Regional – Boshamer Stadium
4	North Carolina A&T	4
2	**Purdue**	**14**
2	Purdue	4
3	**Houston**	**8**
1	**Stetson**	**8**
4	Hartford	3
1	**Stetson**	**10**
3	Oklahoma State	3
3	**Oklahoma State**	**9**
2	South Florida	2
DeLand Regional – Melching Field at Conrad Park
4	Hartford	4
2	**South Florida**	**9**^{11}
2	South Florida	1
3	**Oklahoma State**	**6**

Regional Final
1	**North Carolina**	**19**	–
3	Houston	11	–
1	**Stetson**	**11**	–
3	Oklahoma State	1	–

Super Regional
6	**North Carolina**	**7**	**7**	−
11	Stetson	4	5	−

=== Nashville Super Regional ===
Hosted by Vanderbilt at Hawkins Field

Regional	Regional
1	Florida State	6
4	**Samford**	**7**
4	Samford	0
3	**Oklahoma**	**4**
3	**Oklahoma**	**20**
2	Mississippi State	10
Tallahassee Regional – Dick Howser Stadium
1	Florida State	2
2	**Mississippi State**	**3**
2	**Mississippi State**	**9**
4	Samford	8
1	**Clemson**	**4**
4	Morehead State	3^{10}
1	Clemson	3
2	**Vanderbilt**	**4**
3	St. John's	0
2	**Vanderbilt**	**2**
Clemson Regional – Doug Kingsmore Stadium
4	Morehead State	5
3	**St. John's**	**11**
3	St. John's	8
1	**Clemson**	**9**

Regional Final
3	Oklahoma	5	1
2	**Mississippi State**	**13**	**8**
2	**Vanderbilt**	**19**	–
1	Clemson	6	–

Super Regional
**Mississippi State**	**10**	3	**10**
Vanderbilt	8	**4**	6^{11}

=== Fullerton Super Regional ===
Hosted by Cal State Fullerton at Goodwin Field

Regional	Regional
1	**Stanford**	**4**
4	Wright State	3^{13}
1	Stanford	1
3	**Cal State Fullerton**	**2**
3	**Cal State Fullerton**	**6**
2	Baylor	2
Stanford Regional – Klein Field at Sunken Diamond
4	Wright State	5
2	**Baylor**	**11**
2	Baylor	2
1	**Stanford**	**4**
1	**Coastal Carolina**	**16**
4	LIU Brooklyn	1
1	Coastal Carolina	6
3	**Washington**	**11**
3	**Washington**	**7**
2	Connecticut	1
Conway Regional – Springs Brooks Stadium
4	LIU Brooklyn	3
2	**Connecticut**	**10**
2	**Connecticut**	**6**
1	Coastal Carolina	5

Regional Final
3	**Cal State Fullerton**	**5**	−
1	Stanford	2	−
3	**Washington**	**9**	–
2	Connecticut	6	–

Super Regional
Cal State Fullerton	5	**5**	5
**Washington**	**8**	2	**6**^{10}

== College World Series ==
The College World Series was held at TD Ameritrade Park in Omaha, Nebraska.

=== Participants ===
School	Conference	Record (conference)	Head coach	Previous CWS Appearances	Best CWS Finish	CWS Record Not including this year
Arkansas	SEC	44–19 (18–12)	Dave Van Horn	8 (last: 2015)	2nd (1979)	11–16
Florida	SEC	47–19 (20–10)	Kevin O'Sullivan	11 (last: 2017)	1st (2017)	19–22
Mississippi State	SEC	37–27 (15–15)	Gary Henderson	9 (last: 2013)	2nd (2013)	10–18
North Carolina	ACC	43–18 (22–8)	Mike Fox	10 (last: 2013)	2nd (2006, 2007)	17–21
Oregon State	Pac-12	49–10–1 (20–9–1)	Pat Casey	6 (last: 2017)	1st (2006, 2007)	15–10
Texas	Big 12	42–21 (17–7)	David Pierce	35 (last: 2014)	1st (1949, 1950, 1975, 1983, 2002, 2005)	85–59
Texas Tech	Big 12	44–16 (15–9)	Tim Tadlock	2 (last: 2016)	5th (2016)	1–4
Washington	Pac-12	35–24 (20–10)	Lindsay Meggs	none	none	0–0

=== Bracket ===
Seeds listed below indicate national seeds only

First round
1	Florida	3
9	**Texas Tech**	**6**
5	**Arkansas**	**11**
13	Texas	5
1	**Florida**	**6**
13	Texas	1
3	Oregon State	6
6	**North Carolina**	**8**
**Mississippi State**	**1**
Washington	0
3	**Oregon State**	**14**
Washington	5

Second round
9	Texas Tech	4
5	**Arkansas**	**7**
1	**Florida**	**9**
9	Texas Tech	6
6	North Carolina	2
**Mississippi State**	**12**
3	**Oregon State**	**11**
6	North Carolina	6

Semifinals
5	**Arkansas**	**5**	–
1	Florida	2	–
Mississippi State	2	2
3	**Oregon State**	**12**	**5**

Championship
5	Arkansas	**4**	3	0
3	**Oregon State**	1	**5**	**5**

=== Game results ===
Date	Game	Winning team	Score	Losing team	Winning pitcher	Losing pitcher	Save	Notes
June 16	Game 1	North Carolina	8–6	Oregon State	Caden O'Brien (7–0)	Luke Heimlich (16–2)	Cooper Criswell (1)	Longest 9-inning game in CWS history (4 hours, 24 minutes)
June 16	Game 2	Mississippi State	1–0	Washington	Zach Neff (4–3)	Alex Hardy (5–3)	–	
June 17	Game 3	Arkansas	11–5	Texas	Blaine Knight (13–0)	Nolan Kingham (8–5)	–	
June 17	Game 4	Texas Tech	6–3	Florida	Ryan Shetter (6–0)	Brady Singer (12–2)	–	
June 18	Game 5	Oregon State	14–5	Washington	Kevin Abel (5–1)	Alex Hardy (5–4)	–	Washington eliminated
June 19	Game 6	Mississippi State	12–2	North Carolina	Konnor Pilkington (3–6)	Austin Bergner (7–3)	Cole Gordon (4)	Postponed from June 18 due to rain
June 19	Game 7	Florida	6–1	Texas	Jackson Kowar (10–5)	Blair Henley (6–7)	–	Texas eliminated
June 20	Game 8	Arkansas	7–4	Texas Tech	Barrett Loseke (4–2)	Davis Martin (7–6)	–	Postponed from June 19 due to rain
June 20	Game 9	Oregon State	11–6	North Carolina	Jake Mulholland (2–2)	Brett Daniels (4–2)	–	North Carolina eliminated
June 21	Game 10	Florida	9–6	Texas Tech	Jack Leftwich (5–5)	Caleb Kilian (9–3)	Michael Byrne (16)	Texas Tech eliminated
June 22	Game 11	Oregon State	12–2	Mississippi State	Brandon Eisert (5–3)	Jacob Billingsley (5–4)	–	
June 22	Game 12	Arkansas	5–2	Florida	Isaiah Campbell (5–6)	Brady Singer (12–3)	Matt Cronin (13)	Florida eliminated
June 23	Game 13	Oregon State	5–2	Mississippi State	Kevin Abel (6–1)	Ethan Small (5–4)	–	Mississippi State eliminated
Finals
June 26	Game 1	Arkansas	4–1	Oregon State	Blaine Knight (14–0)	Luke Heimlich (16–3)	Matt Cronin (14)	Postponed from June 25 due to rain
June 27	Game 2	Oregon State	5–3	Arkansas	Kevin Abel (7–1)	Matt Cronin (2–2)	Jake Mulholland (16)	
June 28	Game 3	Oregon State	5–0	Arkansas	Kevin Abel (8−1)	Isaiah Campbell (5–7)	–	Oregon State wins CWS

=== All-Tournament Team ===
The following players were members of the College World Series All-Tournament Team.

Position	Player	School
P	Kevin Abel	Oregon State
P	Blaine Knight	Arkansas
C	**Adley Rutschman (MOP)**	Oregon State
1B	Jared Gates	Arkansas
2B	Hunter Stovall	Mississippi State
3B	Casey Martin	Arkansas
SS	Cadyn Grenier	Oregon State
OF	Dominic Fletcher	Arkansas
OF	Heston Kjerstad	Arkansas
OF	Trevor Larnach	Oregon State
DH	Tyler Malone	Oregon State

== Final standings ==
Seeds listed below indicate national seeds only

Place	School	Record
1st	No. 3 Oregon State	11–2
2nd	No. 5 Arkansas	9–3
3rd	No. 1 Florida	7–4
3rd	Mississippi State	8–4
5th	No. 6 North Carolina	6–2
5th	No. 9 Texas Tech	6–3
7th	No. 13 Texas	5–3
7th	Washington	5–3
9th	Auburn	4–2
9th	Cal State Fullerton	4–2
9th	Duke	5–3
9th	No. 14 Minnesota	3–2
9th	South Carolina	4–2
9th	No. 11 Stetson	3–2
9th	Tennessee Tech	5–3
9th	Vanderbilt	4–2
17th	No. 10 Clemson	2–2
17th	Connecticut	2–2
17th	Dallas Baptist	2–2
17th	Florida Atlantic	3–2
17th	No. 8 Georgia	2–2
17th	Houston	2–2
17th	Indiana	2–2
17th	Louisville	2–2
17th	LSU	2–2
17th	No. 16 NC State	2–2
17th	Oklahoma	2–2
17th	Oklahoma State	2–2
17th	No. 4 Ole Miss	2–2
17th	No. 2 Stanford	2–2
17th	UCLA	2–2
17th	UNC Wilmington	2–2
33rd	Army	1–2
33rd	Baylor	1–2
33rd	No. 15 Coastal Carolina	1–2
33rd	No. 12 East Carolina	1–2
33rd	Gonzaga	1–2
33rd	Jacksonville	1–2
33rd	Kent State	1–2
33rd	Missouri State	1–2
33rd	Northwestern State	1–2
33rd	Purdue	1–2
33rd	Samford	1–2
33rd	South Florida	1–2
33rd	Southern Miss	1–2
33rd	St. John's	1–2
33rd	Texas A&M	1–2
33rd	Troy	1–2
49th	Campbell	0–2
49th	Canisius	0–2
49th	Columbia	0–2
49th	No. 7 Florida State	0–2
49th	Hartford	0–2
49th	LIU Brooklyn	0–2
49th	Morehead State	0–2
49th	New Mexico State	0–2
49th	North Carolina A&T	0–2
49th	Northeastern	0–2
49th	Ohio State	0–2
49th	Oral Roberts	0–2
49th	Saint Louis	0–2
49th	San Diego State	0–2
49th	Texas Southern	0–2
49th	Wright State	0–2

== Record by conference ==
Conference	# of Bids	Record	Win %	Nc Record	Nc Win %	RF	SR	WS	NS	CS	NC
Pac–12	4	20–9	.690	19–8	.704	4	2	2	1	1	1
SEC	10	43–25	.632	33–15	.688	9	6	3	3	1	–
Big 12	5	16–12	.571	16–12	.571	4	2	2	–	–	–
ACC	6	17–13	.567	17–13	.567	5	2	1	–	–	–
Big Ten	4	6–8	.429	6–8	.429	2	1	–	–	–	–
Atlantic Sun	2	4–4	.500	4–4	.500	1	1	–	–	–	–
Ohio Valley	2	5–5	.500	5–5	.500	1	1	–	–	–	–
Big West	1	4–2	.667	4–2	.667	1	1	–	–	–	–
American	4	6–8	.429	6–8	.429	2	–	–	–	–	–
Colonial	2	2–4	.333	2–4	.333	1	–	–	–	–	–
Conference USA	2	4–4	.500	4–4	.500	1	–	–	–	–	–
Missouri Valley	2	3–4	.429	3–4	.429	1	–	–	–	–	–
Sun Belt	2	2–4	.333	2–4	.333	–	–	–	–	–	–
Other	18	6–36	.143	6–36	.143	–	–	–	–	–	–

The columns RF, SR, WS, NS, CS, and NC respectively stand for the Regional Finals, Super Regionals, College World Series Teams, National Semifinals, Championship Series, and National Champion.

Nc is non–conference records, i.e., with the records of teams within the same conference having played each other removed.

== Media coverage ==
=== Radio ===
NRG Media provided nationwide radio coverage of the College World Series through its Omaha station KOZN, in association with Westwood One. It was streamed at westwoodonesports.com, on TuneIn, and on SiriusXM. Kevin Kugler and John Bishop called all games leading up to the Championship Series with Gary Sharp acting as the field reporter. The Championship Series was called by Kugler and Scott Graham with Bishop acting as field reporter.

=== Television ===
ESPN carried every game from the Regionals, Super Regionals, and College World Series across its networks. During the Regionals and Super Regionals ESPN offered a dedicated channel, ESPN Bases Loaded (carried in the same channel allotments as its "Goal Line" services for football), carried live look-ins and analysis across all games in progress.

==== Broadcast assignments ====
Regionals

- Mike Morgan and Greg Swindell: Athens, Georgia
- Tom Hart and Kyle Peterson: Austin, Texas
- Brett Dolan and Scott Pose: Chapel Hill, North Carolina
- Taylor Zarzour and Chris Burke: Clemson, South Carolina
- Richard Cross and Jay Powell: Conway, South Carolina
- Anish Shroff and JT Snow: Corvallis, Oregon
- Mike Keith and Rusty Ensor: DeLand, Florida
- Doug Sherman and John Gregory: Fayetteville, Arkansas

Super Regionals

- Lowell Galindo and Keith Moreland: Austin, Texas
- Roy Philpott and Todd Walker: Chapel Hill, North Carolina
- Clay Matvick and Mike Rooney: Corvallis, Oregon
- Dave Neal, Chris Burke, and Ben McDonald: Fayetteville, Arkansas

College World Series

- Tom Hart, Chris Burke, Ben McDonald, and Mike Rooney: Evenings June 17, 19–20; Afternoons June 16, June 18, June 22–23
- Karl Ravech, Eduardo Pérez, Kyle Peterson, and Laura Rutledge: Evenings June 16, 21–23; Afternoons June 17, 19–20

Regionals

- Steve Lenox and Nick Belmonte: Gainesville, Florida
- Mike Couzens and Lance Cormier: Greenville, North Carolina
- Lowell Galindo and Keith Moreland: Lubbock, Texas
- Clay Matvick and Danan Hughes: Minneapolis, Minnesota
- Sam Ravech and Ben McDonald: Oxford, Mississippi
- "Jim Barbar". espnmediazone.com. Archived from the original on July 27, 2017. and Troy Eklund: Raleigh, North Carolina
- Roxy Bernstein and Wes Clements: Stanford, California
- Dave Neal and Todd Walker: Tallahassee, Florida

Super Regionals

- Mark Neely and Wes Clements: Fullerton, California
- Dari Nowkhah and Eduardo Pérez: Gainesville, Florida
- Mike Morgan and Lance Cormier: Lubbock, Texas
- Tom Hart, Kyle Peterson, and Laura Rutledge: Nashville, Tennessee

College World Series Championship Series

- Karl Ravech, Eduardo Pérez, Kyle Peterson, and Laura Rutledge
