= 2018 Washington Huskies baseball team =

American college baseball season

2018 Washington Huskies baseball

Fullerton Super Regional champions Conway Regional champions

NCAA tournament, College World Series
- Conference: Pac-12 Conference

Ranking
- Coaches: No. 8
- CB: No. 8
- Record: 35–26 (20–10 Pac-12)
- Head coach: Lindsay Meggs (9th season)
- Associate head coach: Jason Kelly (6th season)
- Assistant coaches: Donegal Fergus (5th season); Dave Nakama (1st season)
- Pitching coach: Jason Kelly (6th season)
- Home stadium: Husky Ballpark

2018 Pac-12 Conference baseball standings
	Conf.						Overall
Team	W		L		T	PCT	W		L		T	PCT
No. 18 Stanford ‍†‍‍^{y}	22	–	8	–	0	.733	46	–	12	–	0	.793
No. 1 Oregon State ‍‍‍^{y}	20	–	9	–	1	.683	55	–	12	–	1	.816
No. 8 Washington ‍‍‍^{y}	20	–	10	–	0	.667	35	–	26	–	0	.574
No. 25 UCLA ‍‍‍^{y}	19	–	11	–	0	.633	38	–	21	–	0	.644
California ‍‍‍	16	–	14	–	0	.533	32	–	22	–	0	.593
Arizona ‍‍‍	14	–	16	–	0	.467	34	–	22	–	0	.607
Arizona State ‍‍‍	13	–	17	–	0	.433	23	–	32	–	0	.418
Southern California ‍‍‍	12	–	18	–	0	.400	26	–	28	–	0	.481
Oregon ‍‍‍	12	–	18	–	0	.400	26	–	29	–	0	.473
Washington State ‍‍‍	8	–	21	–	1	.283	16	–	33	–	1	.330
Utah ‍‍‍	8	–	22	–	0	.267	16	–	39	–	0	.291
† – Conference champion y – Invited to the NCAA tournament As of June 29, 2018; Rankings from Collegiate Baseball

The 2018 Washington Huskies baseball team represented the University of Washington in Seattle, Washington in the 2018 NCAA Division I baseball season. Head Coach Lindsay Meggs was in his 9th year coaching the Huskies. They play their home games at Husky Ballpark and were members of the Pac-12 Conference.

The Huskies finished third in the Pac-12. They won the Conway Regional and Fullerton Super Regional to reach the 2018 College World Series, their first time advancing to Omaha.

== Roster ==
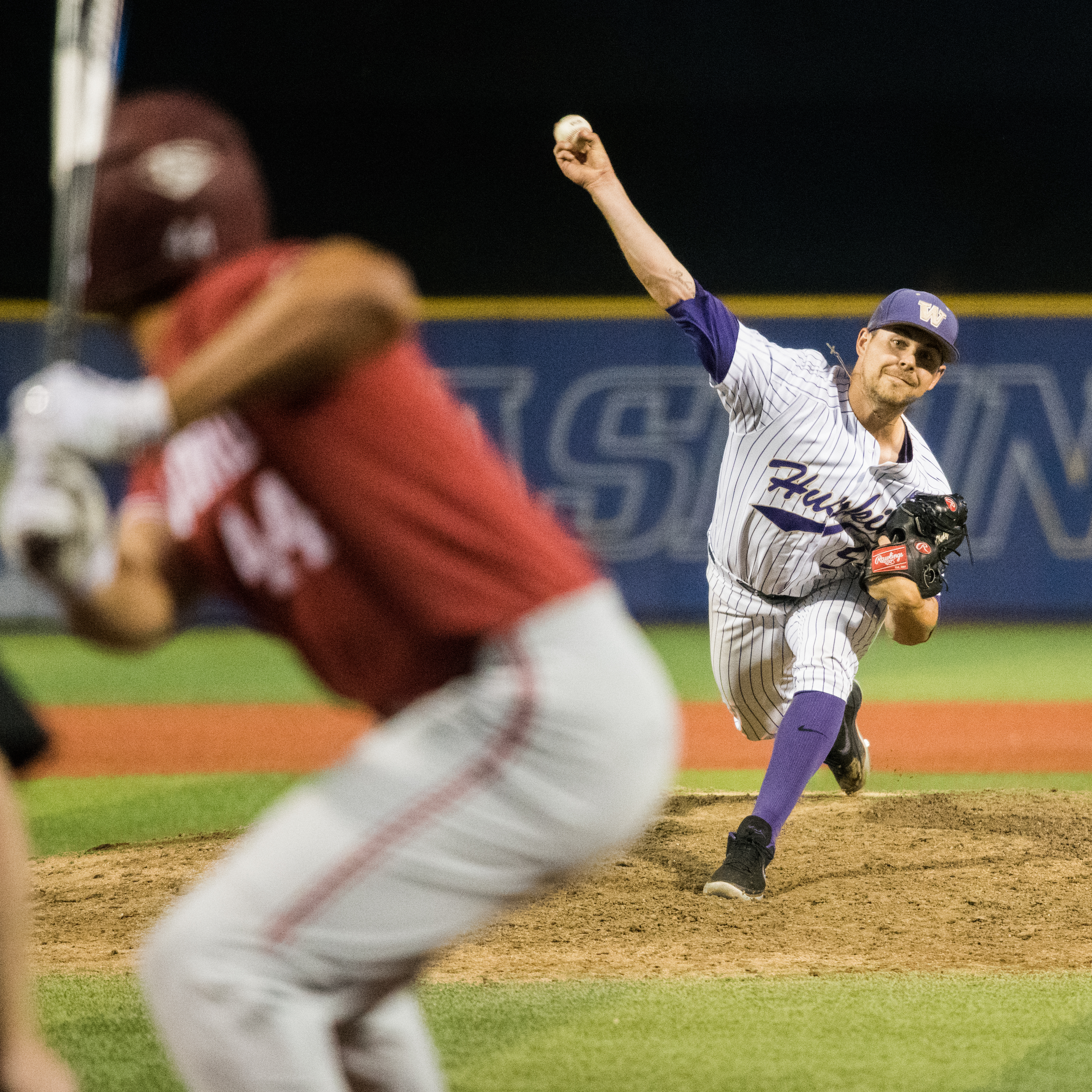
Alex Hardy delivers a pitch on May 24, 2018

2018 Washington Huskies roster
Pitchers: 17 Cole Eigenhuis - Freshman; 18 Adam Davenport - (redshirt) Sophomore; 19 Jordan Jones - Sophomore; 20 Josh Burgmann - (redshirt) Sophomore; 21 Channing Nesbitt - Senior; 23 Dylan Lamb - Freshman; 24 Joe DeMers - Junior; 28 Chris Miceles - Sophomore; 29 Lucas Knowles - (redshirt) Freshman; 31 Stevie Emanuels - Freshman; 32 Leo Nierenberg - Sophomore; 37 Jack Enger - Freshman; 41 Jack DeCooman - Freshman; 42 Cole Galvagno - Freshman; 51 Alex Hardy - Senior	Catchers: 16 Nick Kahle - Sophomore; 27 Michael Petrie - (redshirt) Freshman; 43 Casey Longaker - Junior; Infielders: 2 Nick Roberts - Sophomore; 3 Jonathan Schiffer - Freshman; 5 Christian Jones - Sophomore; 8 Noah Hsue - Freshman; 9 Willie MacIver - Junior; 10 A. J. Graffanino - Junior; 22 Ben Baird - Sophomore; 25 Jack Johnson - (redshirt) Sophomore; 26 Levi Jordan - Senior; 33 Brandon Leitgeb - Freshman; 34 Harrison Goonewardene - Sophomore; 44 Joe Wainhouse - Senior	Outfielders: 1 K. J. Brady - Senior; 6 Mason Cerrillo - Junior; 7 Braiden Ward - Freshman; 12 Kasier Weiss - Freshman; 36 Blake Burton - Sophomore

== Schedule and results ==
Legend
	Washington win
	Washington loss
**Bold**	Washington team member

2018 Washington Huskies baseball game log
Regular season

February
Date	Opponent	Rank	Site/stadium	Score	Win	Loss	Save	Attendance	Overall record	PAC-12 Record
Feb 16	at Sacramento State*		John Smith Field • Sacramento, CA	**W** 4–1 (11)	**Emanuels (1–0)**	Fox (0–1)	None	651	1–0	
Feb 17	at Sacramento State*		John Smith Field • Sacramento, CA	**L** 4–6	Root (1–0)	**Micheles (0–1)**	None	541	1–1	
Feb 18	at Sacramento State*		John Smith Field • Sacramento, CA	**L** 0–6	Randall (1–0)	**Jones** (0–1)	None	464	1–2	
Feb 19	at Sacramento State*		John Smith Field • Sacramento, CA	**W** 8–5	**Knowles (1–0)**	Rodriguez (0–1)	**Hardy (1)**	411	2–2	
Feb 24	UC Riverside*		Husky Ballpark • Seattle, WA	**W** 8–0	**DeMers (1–0)**	Toplikar (1–1)	None	N/A	3–2	
Feb 25	UC Riverside*		Husky Ballpark • Seattle, WA	**W** 5–2	**Jones (1–1)**	Quijada (1–1)	**Hardy (2)**	289	4–2	
Feb 26	UC Riverside*		Husky Ballpark • Seattle, WA	**L** 3–6	Morton (1–0)	**Emanuels (1–1)**	Cannon (1)	333	4–3	

March
Date	Opponent	Rank	Site/stadium	Score	Win	Loss	Save	Attendance	Overall record	PAC-12 Record
Mar 2	vs. Michigan State*		U.S. Bank Stadium • Minneapolis, MN (DQ Classic/Big Ten-Pac 12 Challenge)	**W** 4–3 (10)	**Hardy (1–0)**	Lowery (0–2)	**Emanuels (1)**	N/A	5–3	
Mar 3	at Minnesota*		U.S. Bank Stadium • Minneapolis, MN (DQ Classic/Big Ten-Pac 12 Challenge)	**W** 6–4	**Emanuels (2–1)** (10)	Culliver (1–1)	None	2,702	6–3	
Mar 4	vs Illinois*		U.S. Bank Stadium • Minneapolis, MN (DQ Classic/Big Ten-Pac 12 Challenge)	**L** 1–7	Weber (2–0)	**Jones (1–2)**	Schmitt (1)	N/A	6–4	
Mar 6	Seattle*		Husky Ballpark • Seattle, WA	**L** 3–8	Oldenberg (3–1)	**Nierenberg (0–1)**	Wolf (3)	331	6–5	
Mar 9	Illinois State*		Husky Ballpark • Seattle, WA	**L** 2–3	Cross (1–1)	**Nierenberg (0–2)**	Pauly (1)	310	6–6	
Mar 10	Illinois State*		Husky Ballpark • Seattle, WA	**W** 5–2	**Jones (2–2)**	Headrick (1–1)	None	511	7–6	
Mar 11	Illinois State*		Husky Ballpark • Seattle, WA	**L** 6–13	Lindgren (1–0)	**Micheles (0–2)**	Pauly (2)	611	7–7	
Mar 12	Illinois State*		Husky Ballpark • Seattle, WA	**L** 4–5	Walker (2–0)	**Knowles (1–1)**	Huffman (1)	356	7–8	
Mar 16	Arizona		Husky Ballpark • Seattle, WA	**W** 7–1	**Lamb (1–0)**	Deason (2–1)	None	406	8–8	1–0
Mar 17	Arizona		Husky Ballpark • Seattle, WA	**W** 1–0	**Emanuels (3–1)**	Flynn (2–1)	None	598	9–8	2–0
Mar 18	Arizona		Husky Ballpark • Seattle, WA	**W** 3–2 (10)	**Emanuels (4–1)**	Megill (0–2)	None	851	10–8	3–0
Mar 23	at #1 Oregon State		Goss Stadium at Coleman Field • Corvallis, OR	**RAINED OUT** (Rescheduled for March 24th)						
Mar 24	at No. 1 Oregon State		Goss Stadium at Coleman Field • Corvallis, OR	**L** 1–16	Heimlich (5–0)	**Knowles (1–2)**	None	3,568	10–9	3–1
Mar 24	at No. 1 Oregon State		Goss Stadium at Coleman Field • Corvallis, OR	**L** 2–5	Eisert (3–1)	**DeMers (1–1)**	Pearce (2)	3,261	10–10	3–2
Mar 25	at No. 1 Oregon State		Goss Stadium at Coleman Field • Corvallis, OR	**W** 8–4	**Jones (3–2)**	Gambrell (3–1)	None	3,431	11–10	4–2
Mar 29	at USC		Dedeaux Field • Los Angeles, CA	**L** 0–1	Gursky (2–0)	**Burgmann (0–1)**	Lunn (8)	394	11–11	4–3
Mar 30	at USC		Dedeaux Field • Los Angeles, CA	**W** 5–2	**DeMers (2–1)**	Bates (1–1)	**Hardy (3)**	891	12–11	5–3
Mar 31	at USC		Dedeaux Field • Los Angeles, CA	**W** 9–5	**Hardy (2–0)**	Gursky (2–1)	None	1,288	13–11	6–3

April
Date	Opponent	Rank	Site/stadium	Score	Win	Loss	Save	Attendance	Overall record	PAC-12 Record
Apr 2	at San Diego State*		Tony Gwynn Stadium • San Diego, CA	**L** 4–6	Erickson (2–1)	**Emanuels (4–2)**	Schmitt (1)	609	13–12	
Apr 6	No. 8 East Carolina*		Husky Ballpark • Seattle, WA	**L** 1–5	Holba (7–0)	**Knowles (1–3)**	Ross (4)	N/A	13–13	
Apr 6	No. 8 East Carolina*		Husky Ballpark • Seattle, WA	**W** 8–0	**DeMers (3–1)**	Benton (4–4)	None	503	14–13	
Apr 7	No. 8 East Carolina*		Husky Ballpark • Seattle, WA	**L** 2–7	Smith (5–0)	**Jones (3–3)**	None	473	14–14	
Apr 10	Gonzaga*		Husky Ballpark • Seattle, WA	**W** 5–3	**Hardy (3–0)**	Schulte (0–1)	None	620	15–14	
Apr 13	Oregon		Husky Ballpark • Seattle, WA	**W** 5–3	**Knowles (2–3)**	Mercer (4–3)	DeMers (1)	423	16–14	7–3
Apr 14	Oregon		Husky Ballpark • Seattle, WA	**RAINED OUT** (Rescheduled for April 15th)						
Apr 15	Oregon		Husky Ballpark • Seattle, WA	**L** 4–6 (13)	Nelson (1–1)	**Nierenberg (0–3)**	None	N/A	16–15	7–4
Apr 15	Oregon		Husky Ballpark • Seattle, WA	**W** 4–0	**Jones (4–3)**	Somers (1–5)	**Burgmann (1)**	625	17–15	8–4
Apr 17	at Seattle*		Bannerwood Park • Bellevue, WA	**RAINED OUT** (Rescheduled for May 1st)						
Apr 20	at California		Evans Diamond • Berkeley, CA	**L** 4–11	Patino (3–1)	**Knowles (2–4)**	None	836	17–16	8–5
Apr 21	at California		Evans Diamond • Berkeley, CA	**L** 2–5	Horn (5–4)	**DeMers (3–2)**	**Dodson (9)**	1,157	17–17	8–6
Apr 22	at California		Evans Diamond • Berkeley, CA	**W** 4–3 (10)	**Burgmann (1–1)**	Matulovich (1–1)	None	1,285	18–17	9–6
Apr 23	Texas–Rio Grande Valley*		Husky Ballpark • Seattle, WA	**L** 3–5	Hill (4–3)	**Hardy (3–1)**	Carreon II (2)	418	18–18	
Apr 27	Washington State		Husky Ballpark • Seattle, WA	**W** 15–2	**Knowles (3–4)**	Mullins (0–5)	None	1,496	19–18	10–6
Apr 28	Washington State		Husky Ballpark • Seattle, WA	**RAINED OUT** (Rescheduled for April 29th)						
Apr 29	Washington State		Husky Ballpark • Seattle, WA	**L** 1–4	Sunitsch (5–1)	**DeMers (3–3)**	Walker (5)	N/A	19–19	10–7
Apr 29	Washington State		Husky Ballpark • Seattle, WA	**W** 6–5	**Hardy (4–1)**	Anderson (1–7)	None	1,420	20–19	11–7

May
Date	Opponent	Rank	Site/stadium	Score	Win	Loss	Save	Attendance	Overall record	PAC-12 Record
May 1	at Seattle*		Bannerwood Park • Bellevue, WA	**W** 7–2	**Emanuels (4–2)**	Billig (1–2)	None	147	21–19	
May 4	at Arizona State		Phoenix Municipal Stadium • Phoenix, AZ	**L** 3–4	Raish (4–1)	**Hardy (4–2)**	None	2,056	21–20	11–8
May 5	at Arizona State		Phoenix Municipal Stadium • Phoenix, AZ	**W** 7–3	**DeMers (4–3)**	Corrigan (0–4)	None	2,557	22–20	12–8
May 6	at Arizona State		Phoenix Municipal Stadium • Phoenix, AZ	**W** 7–6	**Jones (5–3)**	Lingos (6–5)	**Hardy (4)**	2,130	23–20	13–8
May 11	No. 8 UCLA		Husky Ballpark • Seattle, WA	**L** 3–7	Bird (6–3)	**Knowles (3–5)**	None	801	23–21	13–9
May 12	No. 8 UCLA		Husky Ballpark • Seattle, WA	**W** 13–6	**DeMers (5–3)**	Lingos (6–5)	None	1,222	24–21	14–9
May 13	No. 8 UCLA		Husky Ballpark • Seattle, WA	**W** 6–4 (11)	**Emanuels (6–2)**	Powell (2–1)	None	750	25–21	15–9
May 15	Portland*		Husky Ballpark • Seattle, WA	**L** 4–6	Budnick (5–1)	**DeCooman (0–1)**	Knutson (8)	569	25–22	
May 17	at Utah		Smith's Ballpark • Salt Lake City, UT	**W** 6–4	**Knowles (4–5)**	Thomas (3–5)	**Hardy (5)**	2,793	26–22	16–9
May 18	at Utah		Smith's Ballpark • Salt Lake City, UT	**W** 7–2	**DeMers (6–3)**	Tedeschi (1–10)	None	2,224	27–22	17–9
May 19	at Utah		Smith's Ballpark • Salt Lake City, UT	**W** 13–7	**Emanuels (7–2)**	Lapiana (2–4)	**Hardy (6)**	2,639	28–22	18–9
May 24	No. 1 Stanford		Husky Ballpark • Seattle, WA	**W** 7–0	**Knowles (5–5)**	Miller (4–3)	DeMers (2)	685	29–22	19–9
May 25	No. 1 Stanford		Husky Ballpark • Seattle, WA	**W** 4–2	**Jones (6–3)**	Beck (8–4)	**Hardy (7)**	942	30–22	20–9
May 26	No. 1 Stanford		Husky Ballpark • Seattle, WA	**L** 5–6	Little (3–0)	**Burgmann (1–2)**	None	1,259	30–23	20–10

Postseason

NCAA Conway Regional
Date	Opponent	Rank	Site/stadium	Score	Win	Loss	Save	Attendance	Overall record	Regional Record
Jun 1	vs. (2) No. 21 Connecticut	(3) No. 30	Springs Brooks Stadium • Conway, SC	**W** 7–1	**DeMers (7–3)**	Feole (9–2)	None	1,971	31–23	1–0
Jun 2	vs. (1) No. 15 Coastal Carolina	(3) No. 30	Springs Brooks Stadium • Conway, SC	**W** 11–6	**Burgmann (2–2)**	Bilous (7–3)	None	3,205	32–23	2–0
Jun 3	vs. (2) No. 21 Connecticut	(3) No. 30	Springs Brooks Stadium • Conway, SC	**W** 9–6	**Emanuels (8–2)**	Dunlop (2–3)	**Hardy (8)**	2,163	33–23	3–0

NCAA Fullerton Super Regional
Date	Opponent	Rank	Site/stadium	Score	Win	Loss	Save	Attendance	Overall record	Super Reg. Record
Jun 8	vs. Cal State Fullerton	No. 13	Goodwin Field • Fullerton, CA	**W** 8–5	**Knowles (6–5)**	Eastman (10–4)	**DeMers (3)**	3,469	34–23	1–0
Jun 9	vs. Cal State Fullerton	No. 13	Goodwin Field • Fullerton, CA	**L** 2–5	Wilson (7–0)	**Jones (6–4)**	None	3,508	34–24	1–1
Jun 10	vs. Cal State Fullerton	No. 13	Goodwin Field • Fullerton, CA	**W** 6–5 (10)	**Hardy (5–2)**	Conine (4–2)	None	3,477	35–24	2–1

College World Series
Date	Opponent	Rank	Site/stadium	Score	Win	Loss	Save	Attendance	Overall record	CWS record
June 16	No. 8 Mississippi State	No. 7	TD Ameritrade Park • Omaha, NE	**L** 0–1	Neff (4–3)	**Hardy (5–3)**	None	24,758	35–25	0–1
June 18	vs. (3) No. 1 Oregon State	No. 7	TD Ameritrade Park • Omaha, NE	**L** 5–14	Abel (5–1)	**Hardy (5–4)**	None	16,881	35–26	0–2

== Rankings ==
Ranking movements Legend: ██ Increase in ranking ██ Decrease in ranking RV = Received votes
	Week																			
Poll	Pre	1	2	3	4	5	6	7	8	9	10	11	12	13	14	15	16	17	18	Final
Coaches'		*													RV	RV*	RV*	RV*	RV*	8
Baseball America															RV	RV*	RV*	RV*	RV*	9
Collegiate Baseball^															RV	30	13	7	8	8
NCBWA†															RV	RV	17	17*	17*	8

^ Collegiate Baseball ranked 40 teams in their preseason poll, but only ranked 30 teams weekly during the season.
† NCBWA ranks 30 teams in their preseason poll, but only ranks 25 teams weekly during the season.
* A new poll was not released for this week, so for comparison purposes, the previous week's ranking is inserted in this week's slot.
