= Trevor Larnach =

American baseball player (born 1997)

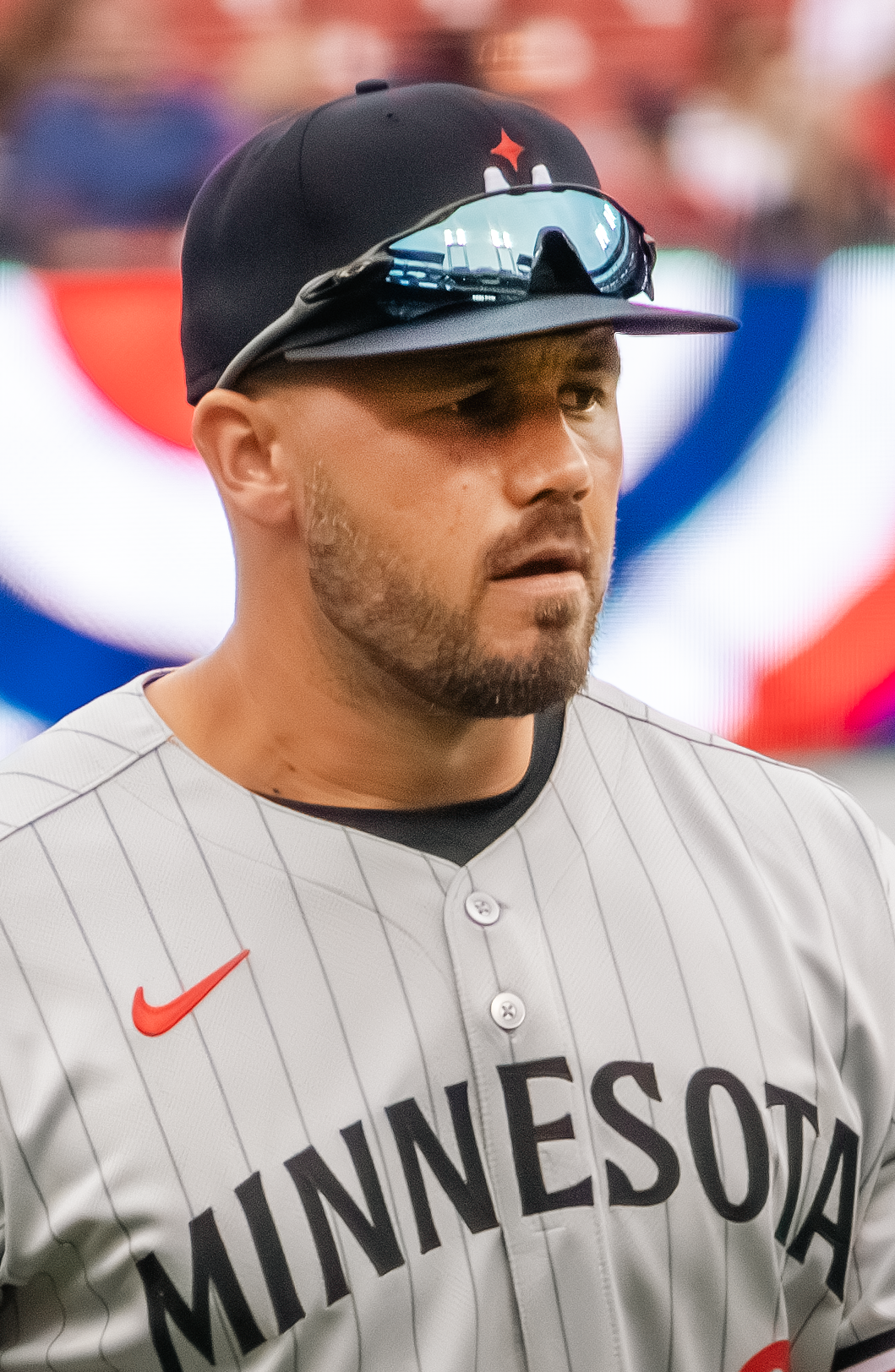
- Larnach with the Twins in 2025

Free agent
- Outfielder
- Born: February 26, 1997 (age 29); Walnut Creek, California, U.S.
- Bats: Left Throws: Right

MLB debut
- May 8, 2021, for the Minnesota Twins

MLB statistics (through 2026 season)
- Batting average: .247
- Home runs: 65
- Runs batted in: 246
- Stats at Baseball Reference

Teams
- Minnesota Twins (2021–2026)

Trevor John Ikaikaloa Larnach (born February 26, 1997) is an American professional baseball outfielder who is a free agent. He has previously played in Major League Baseball (MLB) for the Minnesota Twins. He made his MLB debut in 2021.

== Amateur career ==
Larnach attended College Park High School in Pleasant Hill, California, and was drafted by the San Diego Padres in the 40th round of the 2015 Major League Baseball draft. He did not sign with the Padres and attended Oregon State University where he played college baseball for the Beavers.

As a freshman at Oregon State in 2016, Larnach played in 28 games, hitting .157/.271/.176 with three runs batted in (RBI) over 51 at bats. His appearances were limited because of a broken foot prior to the season. As a sophomore in 2017, he played in 60 games and hit .303/.421/.429 with three home runs and 48 RBI in 198 at bats. After the 2016 and 2017 seasons, he played collegiate summer baseball with the Falmouth Commodores of the Cape Cod Baseball League, where he was named a league all-star in 2016.

In 2018, as a junior, Larnach was named to the Pac-12 All-Conference Team. During Game 2 of the 2018 College World Series against the Arkansas Razorbacks, with Arkansas and OSU tied 3–3 in the top of the ninth inning, Larnach hit a two out, two-run home run to give the Beavers a 5–3 lead. Oregon State went on to win the game and the 2018 College World Series. He was named to the All-Tournament Team. Larnach finished his junior season with a .348 batting average, 19 home runs, and 77 RBIs.

== Professional career ==
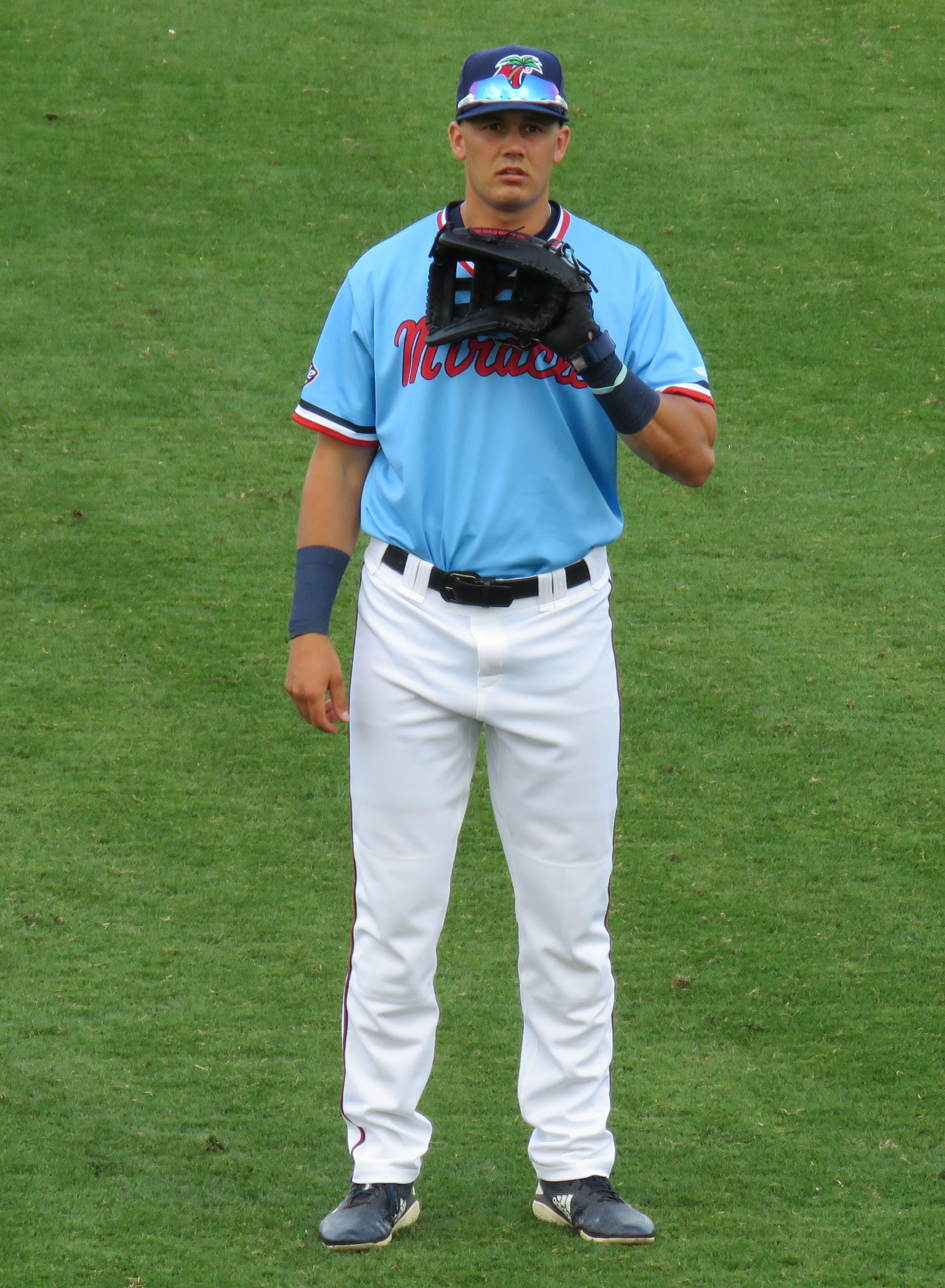
Trevor Larnach, outfielder with the Fort Myers Miracle (Low-A) during a game in Fort Myers, Florida on April 4, 2019.

The Minnesota Twins selected Larnach in the first round, with the 20th overall selection, in the 2018 Major League Baseball draft. He signed with the Twins on July 5 for a $2.55 million signing bonus. He made his professional debut with the Elizabethton Twins of the rookie–level Appalachian League and was promoted to the Cedar Rapids Kernels of the Single–A Midwest League in August. In 42 games between the two teams, he slashed .303/.390/.500 with five home runs and 26 RBIs. Larnach began 2019 with the Fort Myers Miracle of the High–A Florida State League, earning FSL All-Star honors. He was promoted to the Double–A Pensacola Blue Wahoos in July. Over 127 games between the two clubs, Larnach batted .309 with 13 home runs and 66 RBIs. In the summer of 2019, he reached #93 on the MLB prospect list and won Twins Minor League Player of the Year and Florida State League Player of the Year at the end of the season. Larnach did not play in a game in 2020 due to the cancellation of the minor league season because of the COVID-19 pandemic.

On May 7, 2021, Larnach was selected to the 40-man roster and promoted to the major leagues for the first time. Larnach made his MLB debut the next day as the starting left fielder against the Detroit Tigers. The Twins optioned Larnach to the Triple-A St. Paul Saints on August 16, for whom he batted .177/.323/.373 in 51 at bats. He finished his rookie campaign appearing in 79 games and hitting .223/.322/.350 with 7 home runs and 28 RBI and 104 strikeouts in 260 at bats.

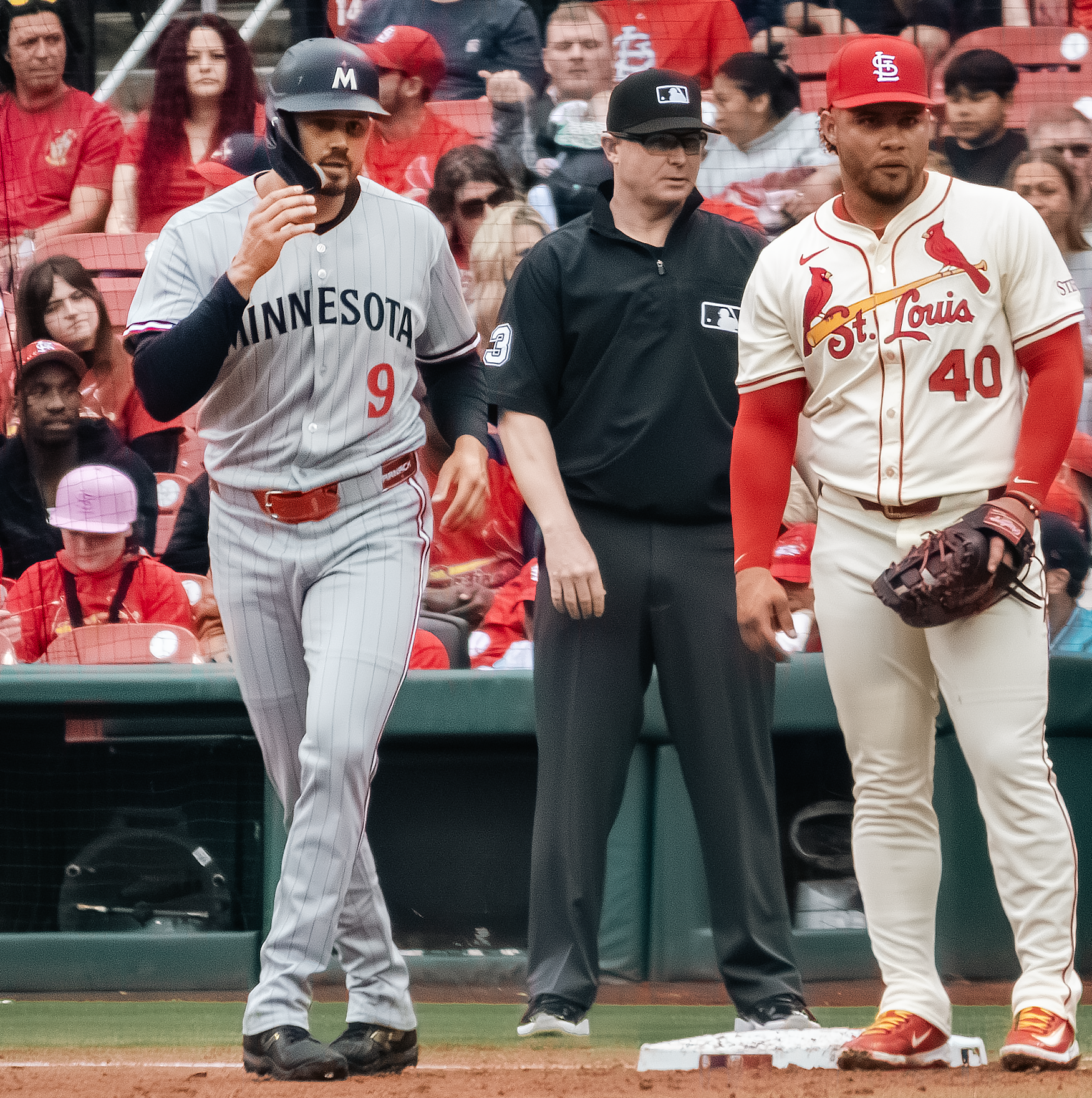
Larnach (left) with Willson Contreras.

In 2022, Larnach played in 51 games for Minnesota, hitting .231/.306/.406 with 5 home runs, 18 RBI, and 57 strikeouts in 160 at bats. Playing for Wichita and St. Paul in the minor leagues, he batted .205/.280/.273 in 12 games. On June 28, 2022, Larnach underwent bilateral surgical repair on a core muscle strain he had suffered days earlier. Initially expected to sideline him six weeks, the procedure ended Larnach’s season.

In 2023, he played in 58 games for Minnesota, batting .213/.311/.415 with career–highs in home runs (8) and RBI (40), and 72 strikeouts in 183 at bats.

Larnach was optioned to Triple–A St. Paul to begin the 2024 season. He made 112 appearances for the Twins during the regular season, batting .259/.338/.434 with 15 home runs, 52 RBI, and four stolen bases. Larnach played in 142 games for Minnesota during the 2025 campaign, slashing .250/.323/.404 with career–highs in home runs (17) and RBI (60).

Prior to the 2026 season, Larnach and the Twins agreed on a one-year deal worth $4.475 million, avoiding salary arbitration. He appeared in 122 total games for Minnesota, batting .269/.352/.436 with 13 home runs and 48 RBI. On November 20, 2026, Larnach was non-tendered by the Twins and became a free agent.

== Personal life ==
Larnach is of Hawaiian descent. His maternal uncle, Brian Cabral, played nine years in the National Football League.
