= Cadyn Grenier =

American baseball player (born 1996)

- Shortstop
- Born: October 31, 1996 (age 29); Henderson, Nevada, U.S.
- Bats: Right Throws: Right
- Stats at Baseball Reference

Career highlights and awards
- Brooks Wallace Award (2018)

Cadyn Thomas Grenier (born October 31, 1996) is an American former professional baseball shortstop. He played college baseball for the Oregon State Beavers, and played for the Baltimore Orioles organization from 2018 to 2023.

== Career ==
=== Amateur career ===
Grenier attended Bishop Gorman High School in Summerlin, Nevada. As a senior in 2015, he batted .472 with six home runs, 35 RBIs, and 66 runs scored and was named the Gatorade Baseball Player of the Year for the state of Nevada. He was drafted by the St. Louis Cardinals in the 21st round of the 2015 MLB draft, but he did not sign and then enrolled at Oregon State University to play for the Oregon State Beavers.

As a freshman at Oregon State in 2016, Grenier played in 52 games with 49 starts, hitting .240 with 18 RBIs along with an on-base percentage of .342. After the 2016 season, he played collegiate summer baseball with the Falmouth Commodores of the Cape Cod Baseball League. In 2017, as a sophomore, he started all 62 of Oregon State's games, slashing .275/.393/.435 with five home runs, 37 RBIs, five doubles and six triples, earning him a spot on the Pac-12 First Team. In 2018, his junior season, he was named the Pac-12 Defensive Player of the Year along with making the Pac-12 First Team for the second consecutive year. He also won the Brooks Wallace Award. He finished his junior year with a slash line of .319/.408/.462 with six home runs and 47 RBIs in 68 games, helping the Beavers win the 2018 College World Series. He was named to the College World Series All-Tournament Team.

=== Professional career ===
The Baltimore Orioles selected Grenier with the 37th overall selection in the 2018 MLB draft. Grenier signed with Baltimore, receiving a $1.8 million signing bonus. The Orioles assigned him to the Delmarva Shorebirds of the Class A South Atlantic League and he spent the whole season there, batting .216 with one home run and 13 RBIs in 43 games.

Grenier returned to Delmarva to begin the 2019 season. In July, he was promoted to the Frederick Keys. Over 106 games between the two teams, he batted .244 with eight home runs and 43 RBIs.

Grenier retired from minor league baseball on April 5, 2023.
