= 2024 UCLA Bruins baseball team =

American college baseball season

2024 UCLA Bruins baseball
- Conference: Pac-12 Conference
- Record: 19–33 (9–21 Pac-12)
- Head coach: John Savage (20th season)
- Hitting coach: Bryant Ward (10th season)
- Home stadium: Jackie Robinson Stadium

2024 Pac-12 Conference baseball standings
	Conf.						Overall
Team	W		L		T	PCT	W		L		T	PCT
No. 25 Arizona ‍†‍‡‍^{y}	20	–	10	–	0	.667	36	–	23	–	0	.610
No. 10 Oregon State ‍‍‍^{y}	19	–	10	–	0	.655	42	–	14	–	0	.750
No. 12 Oregon ‍‍‍^{y}	19	–	11	–	0	.633	37	–	18	–	0	.673
USC ‍‍‍	17	–	12	–	0	.586	31	–	28	–	0	.525
California ‍‍‍	17	–	13	–	0	.567	36	–	19	–	0	.655
Arizona State ‍‍‍	17	–	13	–	0	.567	32	–	26	–	0	.552
Utah ‍‍‍	16	–	14	–	0	.533	33	–	22	–	0	.600
Stanford ‍‍‍	11	–	19	–	0	.367	22	–	32	–	0	.407
Washington ‍‍‍	10	–	20	–	0	.333	19	–	31	–	1	.382
Washington State ‍‍‍	9	–	21	–	0	.300	21	–	32	–	0	.396
UCLA ‍‍‍	9	–	21	–	0	.300	19	–	33	–	0	.365
† – Conference champion ‡ – Tournament champion y – Invited to the NCAA Tournament; As of May 25, 2024; Rankings from D1Baseball

The 2024 UCLA Bruins baseball team represented the University of California, Los Angeles during the 2024 NCAA Division I baseball season. The Bruins played their home games at Jackie Robinson Stadium as a member of the Pac-12 Conference. They were led by head coach John Savage, in his 20th season at UCLA.

== Previous season ==
The Bruins finished with a record of 27–24–1, and 12–16–1 in conference play.

== Personnel ==
=== Roster ===
2024 UCLA Bruins roster
Pitchers: 8 – Cody Delvecchio – Sophomore; 10 – Nate Leibold – Junior; 16 – Jack O'Connor – Sophomore; 19 – Landon Stump – Freshman; 20 – Justin Lee – Freshman; 25 – Josh Alger – Junior; 28 – Cal Randall – Freshman; 29 – Finn McIllroy – Sophomore; 31 – Chris Aldrich – (redshirt) Junior; 32 – James Hepp – Junior; 34 – Luke Rodriguez – Freshman; 35 – Luke Jewett – Junior; 37 – Will Goldberg – Freshman; 38 – Owen Egan – Freshman; 43 – Matthew Gobel – Freshman; 45 – Chris Grothues – Sophomore; 47 – Kaena Kiakona – Freshman; 50 – Rashad Ruff – Graduate; 51 – Caedon Kottinger – Senior; 55 – Michael Barnett – Sophomore	Catchers: 17 – Jack Holman – Junior; 30 – Quintt Landis – Graduate; 33 – Blake Balsz – Freshman; 40 – Cashel Duggar – Freshman; Infielders: 1 – Roch Cholowsky – Freshman; 2 – Duce Gourson – Junior; 3 – Cody Schrier – Junior; 4 – Phoenix Call – Freshman; 5 – Daylen Reyes – Senior; 6 – Grant Gray – Freshman; 7 – Roman Martin – Freshman; 9 – Cameron Kim – Freshman; 14 – AJ Salgado – (redshirt) Junior; 39 – Mulivai Levu – Freshman	Outfielders: 11 – Payton Brennan – Sophomore; 15 – Jarrod Hocking – Sophomore; 18 – Carson Yates – Senior; 21 – JonJon Vaughns – Senior; 24 – Malakhi Knight – Junior; 27 – Keenan Proctor – Sophomore; 36 – Dean West – Freshman; 44 – Toussaint Bythewood – Sophomore; 48 – Aidan Espinoza – Freshman

=== Coaches ===
2022 UCLA Bruins baseball coaching staff
- John Savage – Head coach – 20th season
- Bryant Ward – Assistant coach – 9th season
- Niko Gallego – Assistant coach – 10th season
- David Berg – Assistant coach – 6th season

Note: Season counter accounts for all stints at UCLA.

== Schedule ==
2024 UCLA Bruins game log (19–33)
Regular season: 19-33 (Home: 15-11; Away: 4-20; Neutral: 0-2)

February: 5-3
Game	Date/Time (PST)	Rank	Opponent	Stadium	Score	Win	Loss	Save	Attendance	Overall	Pac-12
1	February 16; 5:00 p.m.	22	Gonzaga*	Jackie Robinson Stadium; Los Angeles, California	8–7	Delvecchio (1–0)	Sotelo (0–1)	Ruff (1)	638	1–0	—
2	February 17; 2:00 p.m.	22	Gonzaga*	Jackie Robinson Stadium; Los Angeles, California	10–3	McIllroy (1–0)	Payton (0–1)	—	578	2–0	–
3	February 18; 12:00 p.m.	22	Gonzaga*	Jackie Robinson Stadium; Los Angeles, California	6–0	Barnett (1–0)	DeSchryver (0–1)	—	704	3–0	—
—	February 20; 5:00 p.m.	22	Loyola Marymount*	Jackie Robinson Stadium; Los Angeles, California	Postponed (weather)					3–0	—
4	February 23; 4:30 p.m.	20	at No. 5 TCU*	Lupton Stadium; Fort Worth, Texas	3–4	Tolle (1–0)	Jewett (0–1)	Abeldt (3)	5,004	3–1	—
5	February 24; 2:00 p.m.	20	at No. 5 TCU*	Lupton Stadium; Fort Worth, Texas	3–6	Sloan (1–0)	McIllroy (1–1)	Hoover (1)	5,278	3–2	–
6	February 25; 11:00 AM	20	at No. 5 TCU*	Lupton Stadium; Fort Worth, Texas	3–13	Morris (1–0)	Barnett (1–1)	—	4,825	3–3	—
7	February 27; 5:00 p.m.		Nevada*	Jackie Robinson Stadium; Los Angeles, California	5–4	Leibold (1–0)	Desch (0–1)	Ruff (2)	312	4–3	—
8	February 28; 5:00 p.m.		Long Beach State*	Jackie Robinson Stadium; Los Angeles, California	12–11 (10)	Ruff (1–0)	Villani (0–1)	—	404	5–3	—

March: 5-12
Game	Date/Time (PST)	Rank	Opponent	Stadium	Score	Win	Loss	Save	Attendance	Overall	Pac-12
9	March 1; 5:00 p.m.		Michigan*; Dodger Stadium College Baseball Classic	Jackie Robinson Stadium; Los Angeles, California	3–4	Volt (1–1)	Delvecchio (1–1)	—	770	5–4	—
—	March 2; 2:00 p.m.		San Diego*; Dodger Stadium College Baseball Classic	Jackie Robinson Stadium; Los Angeles, California	Cancelled (weather)					5–4	—
10	March 3; 3:00 p.m.		No. 20 UC Irvine*; Dodger Stadium College Baseball Classic	Dodger Stadium; Los Angeles, California	2–5	Ojeda (1–0)	Rodriguez (0–1)	Tibbett (3)	4,617	5–5	—
11	March 5; 6:00 p.m.		at Long Beach State*	Blair Field; Long Beach, California	0–2	Donegan (2–0)	Stump (0–1)	Villani (3)	2,066	5–6	—
12	March 8; 6:00 p.m.		at California	Stu Gordon Stadium; Berkeley, California	7–11	Becerra (3–0)	Rodriguez (0–2)	—	546	5–7	0–1
13	March 9; 2:00 p.m.		at California	Stu Gordan Stadium; Berkeley, California	1–4	Sullivan (1–0)	Rodriguez (0–3)	—	745	5–8	0–2
14	March 10; 1:00 p.m.		at California	Stu Gordon Stadium; Berkeley, California	5–6	Stasiowski (1–0)	Ruff (1–1)	—	957	5–9	0–2
15	March 12; 6:00 p.m.		UConn*	Jackie Robinson Stadium; Los Angeles, California	2–5	Coe (2–3)	Kottinger (0–1)	Quinn (1)	332	5–10	0–2
16	March 15; 6:00 p.m.		Washington State*	Jackie Robinson Stadium; Los Angeles, California	4–1	Jewett (1–1)	Taylor (3–1)	Ruff (3)	607	6–10	1–2
17	March 16; 2:00 p.m.		Washington State*	Jackie Robinson Stadium; Los Angeles, California	5–12	Brotherton (2–1)	Kottinger (0–2)	—	668	6–11	1–3
18	March 17; 12:00 p.m.		Washington State*	Jackie Robinson Stadium; Los Angeles, California	9–4	Aldrich (1–0)	Jones (1–2)	—	510	7–11	2–3
19	March 22; 7:00 p.m.		USC*; Rivalry	Jackie Robinson Stadium; Los Angeles, California	2–15	Aoki (2–3)	Jewett (1–2)	—	1,010	7–12	2–4
20	March 23; 2:00 p.m.		USC*; Rivalry	Jackie Robinson Stadium; Los Angeles, California	7–6	Barnett (2–1)	Stromsborg (0–5)	Ruff (4)	881	8–12	3–4
21	March 24; 2:00 p.m.		USC*; Rivalry	Jackie Robinson Stadium; Los Angeles, California	6–3	Rodriguez (1–3)	Feikes (1–1)	Ruff (5)	1,321	9–12	4–4
22	March 26; 6:00 p.m.		UC Santa Barbara	Jackie Robinson Stadium; Los Angeles, California	13–12	Vaughns (1–0)	Moring (1–3)	—	680	10–12	4–4
23	March 28; 7:00 p.m.		at Arizona*	Hi Corbett Field; Tucson, Arizona	3–5	Hintz (1–1)	Egan (0–1)	—	2,168	10–13	4–5
24	March 29; 7:00 p.m.		at Arizona*	Hi Corbett Field; Tucson, Arizona	2–3	Candiotti (2–1)	Ruff (1–2)	—	3,291	10–14	4–6
25	March 30; 1:00 p.m.		at Arizona*	Hi Corbett Field; Tucson, Arizona	9–10	Netz (1–0)	Ruff (1–3)	—	3,349	10–15	4–7

April: 4–13
Game	Date/Time (PST)	Rank	Opponent	Stadium	Score	Win	Loss	Save	Attendance	Overall	Pac-12
26	April 2; 6:00 p.m.		at Loyola Marymount*	George C. Page Stadium; Los Angeles, California	4–1	Lee (1–0)	Geis (0–1)	Ruff (6)	538	11–15	4–7
27	April 5; 7:05 p.m.		#20 Oregon	Jackie Robinson Stadium; Los Angeles, California	4–8	Gordon (4–2)	Jewett (1–3)	—	699	11–16	4–8
28	April 6; 6:05 p.m.		#20 Oregon	Jackie Robinson Stadium; Los Angeles, California	4–3 (10)	Ruff (2–3)	Featherston (1–1)	—	1,100	12–16	5–8
29	April 7; 12:05 p.m.		#20 Oregon	Jackie Robinson Stadium; Los Angeles, California	3–6	Seitter (4–1)	Stump (0–2)	—	927	12–17	5–9
30	April 9; 6:00 p.m.		Pepperdine*	Jackie Robinson Stadium; Los Angeles, California	2–10	Troy (1–1)	Gobel (0–1)	—	291	12–18	5–9
31	April 12; 6:05 p.m.		at Washington	Husky Ballpark; Seattle, Washington	4–5	Cunningham (2–2)	Vaughns (1–1)	—	1,122	12–19	5–10
32	April 13; 2:05 p.m.		at Washington	Husky Ballpark; Seattle, Washington	13–5	Barnett (3–1)	Kirchoff (2–3)	—	1,440	13–19	6–10
33	April 14; 1:05 p.m.		at Washington	Husky Ballpark; Seattle, Washington	4–8	McAdams (1–0)	Lee (1–1)	—	1,391	13–20	6–11
34	April 16; 4:35 p.m.		at UC Santa Barbara*	Caesar Uyesaka Stadium; Santa Barbara, California	0–6	Camarillo (1–0)	Rodriguez (1–4)	Flora (5)	597	13–21	6–11
35	April 19; 6:00 p.m.		Arizona State	Jackie Robinson Stadium; Los Angeles, California	3–5	Jacobs (4–2)	Jewett (1–4)	Schiefer (3)	649	13–22	6–12
36	April 20; 2:00 p.m.		Arizona State	Jackie Robinson Stadium; Los Angeles, California	2–8	Markl (4–2)	Barnett (3–2)	—	779	13–23	6–13
37	April 21; 1:00 p.m.		Arizona State	Jackie Robinson Stadium; Los Angeles, California	1–13	Carlon (3–1)	Stump (0–3)	—	1,205	13–24	6–14
38	April 23; 6:00 p.m.		#12 UC Irvine*	Jackie Robinson Stadium; Los Angeles, California	7–9	Martin (1–0)	Ruff (2–4)	Utagawa (1)	680	13–25	6–14
39	April 26; 5:00 p.m.		at Utah	Smith's Ballpark; Salt Lake City, Utah	2–3 (12)	Hostert (5–3)	Ruff (2–5)	—	1,597	13–26	6–15
40	April 27; 1:00 p.m.		at Utah	Smith's Ballpark; Salt Lake City, Utah	3–7	Jones (3–2)	Barnett (3–3)	—	1,887	13–27	6–16
41	April 28; 12:00 p.m.		at Utah	Smith's Ballpark; Salt Lake City, Utah	7–12	McAnelly (4–2)	Stump (0–4)	—	2,004	13–28	6–17
42	April 30; 3:00 p.m.		at Pepperdine*	Eddy D. Field Stadium; Malibu, California	16–2	Rodriguez (2–4)	Cole (1–3)	—	349	14–28	6–17

May: 5–5
Game	Date/Time (PST)	Rank	Opponent	Stadium	Score	Win	Loss	Save	Attendance	Overall	Pac-12
43	May 3; 6:05 p.m.		Cal State Fullerton*	Angel Stadium; Anaheim, California	1–2 (12)	Tomczak (2–2)	Lee (1–2)	—	3,487	14–29	6–17
44	May 4; 4:00 p.m.		at Cal State Fullerton*	Goodwin Field; Fullerton, California	4–1	Barnett (4–3)	Rodriguez (2–6)	Ruff (7)	1,484	15–29	6–17
45	May 5; 2:00 p.m.		Cal State Fullerton*	Jackie Robinson Stadium; Los Angeles, California	11–4	Lee (2–2)	Turner (0–3)	—	990	16–29	6–17
56	May 7; 6:00 p.m.		at No. 16 UC Irvine*	Anteater Ballpark; Irvine, California	6–9	Ojeda (4–1)	Stump (0–5)	—	1,990	16–30	6–17
57	May 10; 7:00 p.m.		at No. 7 Oregon State	Goss Stadium at Coleman Field; Corvallis, Oregon	0–11	May (5–0)	Jewett (1–5)	Lawson (1)	4,034	16–31	6–18
58	May 11; 5:00 p.m.		at No. 7 Oregon State	Goss Stadium at Coleman Field; Corvallis, Oregon	11–12	Holmes (3–3)	Ruff (2–6)	—	4,032	16–32	6–19
59	May 12; 12:00 p.m.		at No. 7 Oregon State	Goss Stadium at Coleman Field; Corvallis, Oregon	1–15	Segura (6–1)	Rodriguez (2–5)	—	4,066	16–33	6–20
60	May 16; 7:00 p.m.		Stanford	Jackie Robinson Stadium; Los Angeles, California	8–3	Jewett (2–5)	Scott (4–9)	—	580	17–33	7–20
61	May 17; 6:00 p.m.		Stanford	Jackie Robinson Stadium; Los Angeles, California	8–3	Barnett (5–3)	Moore (3–1)	Randall (1)	1,042	18–33	8–20
62	May 18; 12:00 p.m.		Stanford	Jackie Robinson Stadium; Los Angeles, California	10–8	Vaughns (2–1)	O'Harran (1–4)	Lee (1)	979	19–33	9–20

== Rankings ==
Ranking movements Legend: ██ Increase in ranking ██ Decrease in ranking — = Not ranked
	Week																			
Poll	Pre	1	2	3	4	5	6	7	8	9	10	11	12	13	14	15	16	17	18	Final
Coaches'	24	24*	—	—																
Baseball America	—	24	—	—																
NCBWA†	22	19	—	—																
D1Baseball	22	20	—	—																
Perfect Game	18	16	25	—																

† NCBWA ranks 30 teams in their preseason poll, but only ranks 25 teams weekly during the season.
* A new poll was not released for this week, so for comparison purposes, the previous week's ranking is inserted in this week's slot.

== 2024 MLB draft ==
UCLA had three players selected in the 2024 MLB draft.

Player	Position	Round	Overall	MLB team
Luke Jewett	RHP	8	228	Colorado Rockies
Duce Gourson	INF	9	264	Pittsburgh Pirates
Cody Schrier	SS	13	394	Miami Marlins
