= 2024 USC Trojans baseball team =

2023 season of the University of Southern California baseball team

2024 USC Trojans baseball
- Conference: Pac-12 Conference
- Record: 31-28 (17–12 Pac-12)
- Head coach: Andy Stankiewicz (2nd season)
- Assistant coaches: Andy Jenkins (2nd season); Seth Etherton (2nd season); Travis Jewett (2nd season)
- Home stadium: OC Great Park Baseball Complex; Anteater Ballpark; Page Stadium

2024 Pac-12 Conference baseball standings
	Conf.						Overall
Team	W		L		T	PCT	W		L		T	PCT
No. 25 Arizona ‍†‍‡‍^{y}	20	–	10	–	0	.667	36	–	23	–	0	.610
No. 10 Oregon State ‍‍‍^{y}	19	–	10	–	0	.655	42	–	14	–	0	.750
No. 12 Oregon ‍‍‍^{y}	19	–	11	–	0	.633	37	–	18	–	0	.673
USC ‍‍‍	17	–	12	–	0	.586	31	–	28	–	0	.525
California ‍‍‍	17	–	13	–	0	.567	36	–	19	–	0	.655
Arizona State ‍‍‍	17	–	13	–	0	.567	32	–	26	–	0	.552
Utah ‍‍‍	16	–	14	–	0	.533	33	–	22	–	0	.600
Stanford ‍‍‍	11	–	19	–	0	.367	22	–	32	–	0	.407
Washington ‍‍‍	10	–	20	–	0	.333	19	–	31	–	1	.382
Washington State ‍‍‍	9	–	21	–	0	.300	21	–	32	–	0	.396
UCLA ‍‍‍	9	–	21	–	0	.300	19	–	33	–	0	.365
† – Conference champion ‡ – Tournament champion y – Invited to the NCAA Tournament; As of May 25, 2024; Rankings from D1Baseball

The 2024 USC Trojans baseball team represented the University of Southern California (USC) during the 2024 NCAA Division I baseball season. Due to Dedeaux Field being renovated the Trojans played their home games OC Great Park Baseball Complex, Anteater Ballpark in Irvine, and Page Stadium in Los Angeles. The team was coached by Andy Stankiewicz in his 2nd season at USC.

== Previous season ==
The Trojans ended the 2023 season with a record of 17–13 in conference play and 34-23-1 overall record good for 4th place in the Pac-12. They would play in the Pac-12 tournament as the #4 Seed on Pool C in Game 1 of Pool Play they would beat rival UCLA by a score of 6–4, then in Game 2 of Pool Play they would lose to Washington eliminating them from the tournament and ending their season.

=== 2023 MLB draft ===
The Trojans had one player drafted in the 2023 MLB draft.

Player	Position	Round	Overall	MLB Team
Johnny Olmstead	INF	19th	563	Miami Marlins

== Roster ==
2024 USC Trojans roster
Pitchers: 3 – William Watson – Junior; 4 – Brock Blatter – Sophomore; 11 – Michael Ebner – Sophomore; 12 – Caden Aoki – Junior; 14 – Xavier Martinez – Junior; 18 – Josh Blum – Junior; 21 – Jared Feikes – Graduate; 22 – Michael Ryhlick – Senior; 24 – Tyler Stromsborg – Senior; 25 – Fisher Johnson – Junior; 30 – Mason Edwards – Freshman; 31 – Eric Hammond – (redshirt) Sophomore; 35 – Andrew Harbour – Freshman; 36 – Garren Rizzo – Freshman; 37 – Adrian Blanchet – Freshman; 38 – Sax Matson – Freshman; 39 – Brodie Purcell – Freshman; 41 – Thomas Di Landri – Junior; 45 – Dylan Tostrup – Junior; 95 – Channing Austin – (redshirt) Junior	Catchers: 5 – Connor Clift – Graduate; 26 – Luca DiPaolo – Sophomore; 40 – Jacob Galloway – Sophomore; 55 – Gavin Mez – Junior; Infielders: 2 – KaiKea Harrison – Sophomore; 6 – Dean Carpentier – Freshman; 13 – Ryan Jackson – Senior; 15 – Ethan Hedges – Sophomore; 20 – Chris Brown – Graduate; 27 – Bryce Martin-Grudzielanek – (redshirt) Sophomore; 77 – Abbrie Covarrubias – Freshman	Outfielders: 9 – Carson Wells – Senior; 10 – Austin Overn – Sophomore; 16 – Brayden Dowd – Freshman; 23 – Ty Silva – Freshman; 32 – Duce Robinson – Freshman	Two Way Players: 8 – Kevin Takeuchi – Freshman; 28 – Riley Hunsaker – Freshman; 29 – Andrew Lamb – Freshman; 34 – JT Waldon – Junior

=== Coaches ===
2024 USC Trojans baseball coaching staff
- Andy Stankiewicz – Head coach – 2nd season
- Travis Jewett – Assistant coach – 2nd season
- Seth Etherton – Assistant coach – 2nd season
- Andy Jenkins – Assistant coach – 2nd season

Note: Season counter accounts for all stints at USC.

=== Opening Day ===
Opening Day Starters
Name	Position
Austin Overn	CF
Ryan Jackson	SS
Jacob Galloway	C
Bryce Martin-Grudzielanek	2B
Chris Brown	DH
Luca DiPaolo	LF
Carson Wells	RF
Ethan Hedges	1B
Abbrie Covarruibias	3B
Caden Aoki	P

== Game log ==
2024 USC Trojans baseball game log
Regular season (28–27)
Overall: 31–28

February (2–6)
Date	TV/Time (PT)	Opponent	Rank	Stadium	Score	Win	Loss	Save	Attendance	Overall	Conference
February 16	MLB.TV; 4:00 p.m.	vs BYU*; MLB Desert Invitational	--	Sloan Park; Mesa, Arizona	L 1-8	Ben Hansen (1–0)	Caden Aoki (0–1)	None	575	0-1	—
February 17	MLB Network; 6:00 p.m.	vs Grand Canyon*; MLB Destert Invitational	--	Salt River Fields at Talking Stick; Scottsdale, Arizona	L 1-8	Carter Young (1–0)	Tyler Stromsborg (0–1)	None	575	0-2	—
February 18	MLB.TV; 4:00 p.m.	vs Ohio State*; MLB Dester Invitational	--	Sloan Park; Mesa, Arizona	L 2-5	Gavin Bruni (1–0)	Eric Hammond (0–1)	Justin Eckhardt (1)	575	0-3	—
February 20	USC Live Stream; 6:00 p.m.	vs UC San Diego*	--	Page Stadium; Los Angeles, California	Canceled (inclement weather)					0-3	—
February 22	ESPN+ 6:30 p.m.	at Loyola Marymount*	--	Page Stadium; Los Angeles, California	L 3-5	Cole Stucky (1–0)	Mason Edwards (0–1)	Jeff Heinrich (1)	473	0-4	—
February 23	USC Live Stream; 6:30 p.m.	vs Portland*	--	Great Park Baseball Complex; Irvine, California	L 0-4	Nick Brink (1–0)	Caden Aoki (0–2)	Jack Folkins (1)	508	0-5	—
February 24	USC Live Stream; 6:30 p.m.	vs Portland*	--	Great Park Baseball Complex; Irvine, California	W 6-5	Jared Feikes (1–0)	Carter Gaston (1-1)	None	1,098	1-5	—
February 25	USC Live Stream; 1:00 p.m.	vs Portland *	--	Great Park Baseball COmplex; Irvine, California	W 10-4	Michael Ebner (1–0)	Joey Cartrell (1-1)	None	711	2-5	—
February 27	Pac-12 Insider; 6:00 p.m.	vs Michigan*	--	Page Stadium; Los Angeles, California	L 5-8	Chase Allen (2–0)	Mason Edwards (0–2)	Ricky Kidd (2)	258	2-6	—

March (9-9)
Date	TV/Time (PT)	Opponent	Rank	Stadium	Score	Win	Loss	Save	Attendance	Overall	Conference
March 1	FloBaseball; 2:00 p.m.	vs No. 5 TCU*; Kubota College Baseball Series	--	Globe Life Field; Arlington, Texas	L 8-9 11	Kyle Ayers (1–0)	Michael Ryhlick (0–1)	None	--	2-7	—
March 2	FloBaseball; 2:00 p.m.	vs No. 7 Texas A&M*; Kubota College Baseball Classic	--	Globe Life Field; Arlington, Texas	L 3-9	Moss Weston (2–0)	Tyler Stromsborg (0–2)	None	--	2-8	—
March 3	FloBaseball; 3:10 p.m.	vs No. 5 TCU*; Kubota College Baseball Classic	--	Globe Life Field; Arlington, Texas	L 5-9	Storm Hierholzer (1–0)	Eric Hammond (0–2)	None	6,516	2-9	—
March 5	ESPN+ 6:00 p.m.	at Cal State Fullerton*	--	Goodwin Field; Fullerton, California	W 6-5	Xavier Martinez (1–0)	Ryan Faulks (0–1)	Josh Blum (1)	1,270	3-9	—
March 8	USC Live Stream; 6:30 p.m.	vs Arizona	--	Great Park Baseball Complex; Irvine, California	L 9-16	Jackson Kent (2–0)	Caden Aoki (0–3)	None	753	3-10	0–1
March 9	USC Live Stream; 6:30 p.m.	vs Arizona	--	Great Park Baseball Complex; Irvine, California	L 6-9	Clark Candiotti (1–0)	Tyler Stromsborg (0–3)	None	807	3-11	0–2
March 10	USC Live Stream; 1:00 p.m.	vs Arizona	--	Great Park Baseball Complex; Irvine, California	W 4-1	Eric Hammond (1–2)	Cam Walty (3–1)	Josh Blum (2)	1,059	4-11	1–2
March 12	USC Live Stream; 6:30 p.m.	vs California Baptist*	--	Great Park Baseball Complex; Irvine, California	L 2-3	Seth Mattox (1–0)	Garren Rizzo (0–1)	Nathan Hemmerling (1)	498	4-12	—
March 15	Stanford Live Stream; 6:00 p.m.	at Stanford	--	Sunken Diamond; Stanford, California	W 5-2	Caden Aoki (1–3)	Matt Scott (2–3)	None	1,616	5-12	2-2
March 16	Stanford Live Stream; 2:00 p.m.	at Stanford	--	Sunken Diamond; Stanford, California	L 1-7	Christian Lim (2-2)	Tyler Stromsborg (0–4)	None	1,677	5-13	2–3
March 17	Stanford Live Stream; 1:00 p.m.	at Stanford	--	Sunken Diamond; Stanford, California	W 11-8	Josh Blum (1–0)	Toran O'Harran (0–1)	None	2,316	6-13	3-3
March 19	ESPN+ 6:00 p.m.	at Long Beach State*	--	Blair Field; Long Beach, California	W 7-3	Andrew Harbour (1–0)	Owen Geiss (0–1)	Xavier Martinez (1)	1,871	7-13	—
March 22	P12N; 7:00 p.m.	at UCLA rivalry	--	Jackie Robinson Stadium; Los Angeles, California	W 15-2	Caden Aoki (2–3)	Luke Jewett (1–2)	None	1,010	8-13	4–3
March 23	P12LA; 2:00 p.m.	at UCLA rivlary	--	Jackie Robinson Stadium; Los Angeles, California	L 6-7	Michael Bernett (2–1)	Tyler Stromsborg (0–5)	Rashad Ruff (4)	881	8-14	4-4
March 24	P12N; 2:00 p.m.	at UCLA rivalry	--	Jackie Robinson Stadium; Los Angeles, California	L 3-6	Luke Rodriguez (1–3)	Jared Feikes (1-1)	Rashad Ruff (5)	1,321	8-15	4–5
March 26	USC Live Stream; 6:30 p.m.	vs Fresno State*	--	Great Park Baseball Complex; Irvine, California	W 10-1	Fisher Johnson (1–0)	Caleb Anderson (0–1)	None	389	9-15	—
March 28	USC Live Strea; 6:30 p.m.	vs No. 2 Oregon State	--	Anteater Ballpark; Irvine, California	W 2-1	Josh Blum (2–0)	Kellan Oakes (3–1)	None	655	10-15	5-5
March 29	USC Live Stream; 6:30 p.m.	vs No. 2 Oregon State	--	Anteater Ballpark; Irvine, California	W 17-4	Fisher Johnson (2–0)	Jacob Kmatz (3–1)	None	977	11-15	6–5
March 30	USC Live Strea; 1:00 p.m.	vs No. 2 Oregon State	--	Anteater Ballpark; Irvine, California	Canceled (inclement weather)					11-15	6–5

April (10–8)
Date	TV/Time (PT)	Opponent	Rank	Stadium	Score	Win	Loss	Save	Attendance	Overall	Conference
April 2	USC Live Stream; 6:00 p.m.	at San Diego*	--	Fowler Park; San Diego, California	L 3-9	Drake Frize (3–1)	Garren Rizzo (0–2)	Conner Thurman (1)	629	11-16	—
April 3	USC Live Stream; 6:00 p.m.	vs UC San Diego*	--	Page Stadium; Los Angeles, California	W 5-0	Tyler Stromsborg (1–5)	Landon Marchetti (1-1)	None	213	12-16	—
April 5	USC Live Stream; 6:30 p.m.	vs Washington	--	Great Park Baseball Complex; Irvine, California	W 6-2	Eric Hammond (2-2)	Jared Engman (0–6)	None	438	13-16	7–5
April 6	USC Live Stream; 2:00 p.m.	vs Washington	--	Great Park Baseball Complex; Irvine, California	W 9-5	Tyler Stromsborg (2–5)	Calvin Kirchoff (2-2)	None	919	14-16	8–5
April 7	USC Live Stream; 1:00 p.m.	vs Washington	--	Great Park Baseball Complex; Irvine, California	W 6-5	Xavier Martinez (2–0)	Spencer Dessart (2–3)	Josh Blum (3)	952	15-16	9–5
April 9	USC Live Stream; 6:00 p.m.	vs No. 12 UC Irvine*	--	Page Stadium; Los Angeles, California	W 12-5	Fisher Johnson (3–0)	Tim Grack (0–1)	None	374	16-16	—
April 12	Oregon Live Stream; 5:00 p.m.	at No. 17 Oregon	--	PK Park; Eugene, Oregon	L 1-4	RJ Gordon (5–2)	Tyler Stromsborg (2–6)	Logan Mercado (6)	2,401	16-17	9–6
April 13	Oregon Live Stream; 3:30 p.m.	at No. 17 Oregon	--	PK Park; Eugene, Oregon	L 3-5	Grayson Grinsell (4–2)	Fisher Johnson (3–1)	Bradley Mullan (4)		16-18	9–7
April 14	Oregon Live Stream; 12:00 p.m.	at No. 17 Oregon	--	PK Park; Eugenu, Oregon	W 4-2	Williams Watson (1–0)	Brock Moore (1-1)	Josh Blum (4)	2,256	17-18	10–7
April 16	USC Live Stream; 6:30 p.m.	vs San Diego*	--	Great Park Baseball Complex; Irvine, California	L 2-3	Ivran Romero (5–1)	Mason Edwards (0–3)	Drake Frize (2)	411	17-19	—
April 17	ESPN+ 6:00 p.m.	at No. 15 UC Irvine*	--	Anteater Ballpark; Irvine, California	W 12-4	Michael Ebner (2–0)	Ryder Brooks (2–1)	None	955	18-19	—
April 19	USC Live Stream; 6:30 p.m.	vs Sacramento State*	--	Great Park Baseball Complex; Irvine, California	L 3-6	Evan Gibbons (3–4)	Tyler Stromsborg (2–7)	Kade Brown (6)	329	18-20	—
April 20	USC Live Stream; 2:00 p.m.	vs Santa Clara*	--	Great Park Baseball Complex; Irvine, California	W 12-11	Brodie Purcell (1–0)	Blake Hammond (1–3)	Josh Blum (5)	598	19-20	—
April 21	USC Live Stream; 1:00 p.m.	vs Sacramento State*	--	Great Park Baseball Complex; Irvine, California	L 4-5	Xavier Richards (3–0)	William Watson (1-1)	Kade Brown (7)	783	19-21	—
April 23	ESPN+ 6:00 p.m.	at Cal State Fullerton*	--	Goodwin Field; Fullerton, California	W 6-4	Jared Feikes (2–1)	Aaron Ceniceros (0–1)	Josh Blum (6)	812	20-21	—
April 26	ASU Live Stream; 6:30 p.m.	at Arizona State	--	Phoenix Municipal Stadium; Phoenix, Arizona	L 1-12	Ben Jacobs (5–2)	Tyler Stromsborg (2–8)	None	2,720	20-22	10–8
April 27	ASU Live Stream; 6:30 p.m.	at Arizona State	--	Phoenix Municipal Stadium; Phoenix, Arizona	L 2-17	Connor Markl (5–2)	Michael Ebner (2–1)	None	3,356	20-23	10–9
April 28	ASU Live Stream; 1:00 p.m.	at Arizona State	--	Phoenix Municipal Stadium; Phoenix, Arizona	W 11-6	Williams Watson (2–1)	Wyatt halvorson (1–3)	None	2,585	21-23	11–9

May (8–4)
Date	TV/Time (PT)	Opponent	Rank	Stadium	Score	Win	Loss	Save	Attendance	Overall	Conference
May 3	USC Live Stream; 6:30 p.m.	vs California	--	Great Park Baseball Complex; Irvine, California	W 5-1	Tyler Stromsborg (3–8)	Austin Turkington (1-1)	None	781	22-23	12–9
May 4	USC Live Stream; 2:00 p.m.	vs California	--	Great Park Baseball Complex; Irvine, California	L 4-11	Christian Becerra (4–1)	Jared Feikes (2-2)	None	1,037	22-24	12–10
May 5	USC Live Stream; 12:00 p.m.	vs California	--	Great Park Baseball Complex; Irvine, California	L 3-6	Trey Newmann (4-4)	William Watson (2-2)	Tyler Stasiowski (4)	1,248	22-25	12–11
May 7	ESPN+ 6:00 p.m.	at Long Beach State*	--	Blair Field; Long Beach, California	L 6-7 12	Mason Dillow (1–0)	Dylan Tostrup (0–1)	None	2,046	22-26	—
May 10	P12NLA; 6:00 p.m.	at Washington State	--	Bailey-Brayton Field; Pullman, Washington	L 8-20	Grant Taylor (5–3)	Tyler Stromsborg (3–9)	None	1,129	22-27	12-12
May 11	P12N; 2:00 p.m.	at Washington State	--	Bailey-Brayton Field; Pullman, Washington	W 9-4	Brodie Purcell (2–0)	Rylan Haider (2–3)	None	1,490	23-27	13–12
May 12	P12N Washington; 12:00 p.m.	at Washington State	--	Bailey-Brayton Field; Pullman, Washington	W 10-3	William Watson (3–2)	Duke Brotherton (5–7)	None	1,217	24-27	14–12
May 14	ESPN+ 6:00 p.m.	at Gonzaga*	--	Patterson Baseball Complex; Spokane, Washington	W 15-3	Michael Ebner (1-1)	O'Brian Finbar (0–1)	None	1,066	25-27	—
May 16	USC Live Stream; 6:30 p.m.	vs Utah	--	Great Park Baseball Complex; Irvine, California	W 6-5	Xavier Martinez (3–0)	Micah Ashman (1–3)	Josh Blum (7)	632	26-27	15–12
May 17	USC Live Stream; 6:30 p.m.	vs Utah	--	Great Park Baseball Complex; Irvine, California	W 8-2	William Watson (4–2)	Merit Jones (3–5)	Michael Ebner (1)	894	27-27	16–12
May 18	USC Live Stream; 1:00 p.m.	vs Utah; Senior Day	--	Great Park Baseball Complex; Irvine, California	W 5-3	Tyler Stromsborg (4–9)	Colter McAnelly (5–4)	Xavier Martinez (2)	1,081	28-27	17–12

Postseason (3–1)

Pac-12 Tournament (3–1)
Date	TV/Time (PT)	Opponent	Seed	Stadium	Score	Win	Loss	Save	Attendance	Overall	P12T Record
May 21	P12N; 2:30 p.m.	vs Utah (Group C Pool Play)	#4	Scottsdale Stadium; Scottsdale, Arizona	W 7-6	Xavier Martinez (4–0)	Micah Ashman (1–4)	Josh Blum (8)	1,738	29-27	1–0
May 23	P12N; 2:30 p.m.	vs No. 23 Oregon (Group C Pool Play)	#4	Scottsdale Stadium; Scottsdale, Arizona	W 4-2	William Watson (5–2)	RJ Gordon (7–5)	Josh Blum (9)	--	30-27	2–0
May 24	P12N; 2:30 p.m.	vs California; Semifinal	#4	Scottsdale Stadium; Scottsdale, Arizona	W 7-4	Mason Edwards (1–3)	Trey Newmann (4–6)	Josh Blum (10)	--	31-27	3–0
May 25	ESPNU; 7:00 p.m.	vs No. 18 Arizona; Championship Game	#4	Scottsdale Stadium; Scottsdale, Arizona	L 3–4	Anthony Susac (2–2)	Josh Blum (2–1)	None	3,813	31–28	3–1

Legend: = Win = Loss = Canceled
Bold =USC team member
Rankings are based on the team's current ranking in the D1Baseball poll.

== Game summaries ==
=== Pool C ===
	Pool C	ORE	USC	UTAH
3	Oregon		2-4	2-4
4	USC	4-2		7-6
7	Utah	4-2	6-7	

Pos	Team	Pld	W	L	RF	RA	RD	PCT	Qualification
1	(4) USC	2	2	0	11	4	+7	1.000	Advanced to Semifinals
2	(7) Utah	2	1	1	6	7	−1	.500	Eliminated
3	(3) Oregon	2	0	2	4	8	−4	.000	Eliminated

May 21; 2:30 p.m. Game 2	(7) Utah	6-7	(4) USC	Scottsdale Stadium, Scottsdale, AZ; Attendance: 1,738; Umpires: HP: Nate White; 1B: Steve Mattingly; 2B: Mike Lusky; 3B: Joe Burleson
May 21; 2:30 p.m. Game 2	LP: Micah Ashman (1-4)		WP: Xavier Martinez (4-0); Sv: Josh Blum (8)	Scottsdale Stadium, Scottsdale, AZ; Attendance: 1,738; Umpires: HP: Nate White; 1B: Steve Mattingly; 2B: Mike Lusky; 3B: Joe Burleson
May 21; 2:30 p.m. Game 2	HR: K. Carpenter (7)		HR: Carson Wells (4)	Scottsdale Stadium, Scottsdale, AZ; Attendance: 1,738; Umpires: HP: Nate White; 1B: Steve Mattingly; 2B: Mike Lusky; 3B: Joe Burleson

---

May 23; 2:30 p.m. Game 8	(4) USC	4-2	(3) Oregon	Scottsdale Stadium, Scottsdale, AZ; Umpires: HP: Ramon Armendariz; 1B: Darren Hyman; 2B: Mike Fichter; 3B: Pat Riley
May 23; 2:30 p.m. Game 8	WP: William Watson (5-2); Sv: Josh Blum (9)		LP: RJ Gordon (7-5)	Scottsdale Stadium, Scottsdale, AZ; Umpires: HP: Ramon Armendariz; 1B: Darren Hyman; 2B: Mike Fichter; 3B: Pat Riley
May 23; 2:30 p.m. Game 8	HR: Ryan Jackson (4)		HR: None	Scottsdale Stadium, Scottsdale, AZ; Umpires: HP: Ramon Armendariz; 1B: Darren Hyman; 2B: Mike Fichter; 3B: Pat Riley

== Finals ==
Semifinals May 24
4	USC'	7
6	California	4
1	Arizona	6
8	Stanford	3

Final May 25
4	USC	3
1	Arizona	4

== Semifinal ==
May 24; 2:30 p.m. Game 1	No. 6 California	4-7	No. 4 USC	Scottsdale Stadium, Scottsdale, AZ; Umpires: HP: Bill Van Raaphorst; 1B: Mike Fichter; 2B: Steve Mattingly; 3B: Scott Letendre
May 24; 2:30 p.m. Game 1	LP: Trey Newmann (4–6)		WP: Mason Edwards (1–3); Sv: Josh Blum (10)	Scottsdale Stadium, Scottsdale, AZ; Umpires: HP: Bill Van Raaphorst; 1B: Mike Fichter; 2B: Steve Mattingly; 3B: Scott Letendre
May 24; 2:30 p.m. Game 1	HR: Caleb Lomavita		HR: Brayden Dowd	Scottsdale Stadium, Scottsdale, AZ; Umpires: HP: Bill Van Raaphorst; 1B: Mike Fichter; 2B: Steve Mattingly; 3B: Scott Letendre

== Final ==
May 25; 7:00 p.m. Game 11	No. 4 USC	3–4	No. 1 Arizona	Scottsdale Stadium, Scottsdale, AZ; Attendance: 3,813; Umpires: HP: Darren Hyman; 1B: Kellen Levy; 2B: Joe Burleson; 3B: Bill Van Raaphorst
May 25; 7:00 p.m. Game 11	LP: Josh Blum (2–1)		WP: Anthony Susac (2–2)	Scottsdale Stadium, Scottsdale, AZ; Attendance: 3,813; Umpires: HP: Darren Hyman; 1B: Kellen Levy; 2B: Joe Burleson; 3B: Bill Van Raaphorst

== Rankings ==
Ranking movements
	Week																
Poll	Pre	1	2	3	4	5	6	7	8	9	10	11	12	13	14	15	Final
Coaches'		*															
Baseball America																	
NCBWA†																	

† NCBWA ranks 30 teams in their preseason poll, but only ranks 25 teams weekly during the season.
* A new poll was not released for this week, so for comparison purposes, the previous week's ranking is inserted in this week's slot.
