= 2024 Arizona Wildcats baseball team =

College baseball team in the 2024 NCAA Division I season

2024 Arizona Wildcats baseball

Pac-12 Tournament Champions Pac-12 Regular Season Champions

Tucson Regional, 0–2
- Conference: Pac-12 Conference
- CB: No. 13
- Record: 36–23 (20–10 Pac-12)
- Head coach: Chip Hale (3rd season)
- Assistant coaches: Trip Couch (3rd season); Kevin Vance (1st season); Toby Demello (3rd season)
- Home stadium: Hi Corbett Field

2024 Pac-12 Conference baseball standings
| | Conf. | | | | | | Overall |
| Team | W | | L | | T | PCT | W | | L | | T | PCT |
|---|---|---|---|---|---|---|---|---|---|---|---|---|
| No. 25 Arizona ‍†‍‡‍^{y} | 20 | – | 10 | – | 0 | .667 | 36 | – | 23 | – | 0 | .610 |
| No. 10 Oregon State ‍‍‍^{y} | 19 | – | 10 | – | 0 | .655 | 42 | – | 14 | – | 0 | .750 |
| No. 12 Oregon ‍‍‍^{y} | 19 | – | 11 | – | 0 | .633 | 37 | – | 18 | – | 0 | .673 |
| USC ‍‍‍ | 17 | – | 12 | – | 0 | .586 | 31 | – | 28 | – | 0 | .525 |
| California ‍‍‍ | 17 | – | 13 | – | 0 | .567 | 36 | – | 19 | – | 0 | .655 |
| Arizona State ‍‍‍ | 17 | – | 13 | – | 0 | .567 | 32 | – | 26 | – | 0 | .552 |
| Utah ‍‍‍ | 16 | – | 14 | – | 0 | .533 | 33 | – | 22 | – | 0 | .600 |
| Stanford ‍‍‍ | 11 | – | 19 | – | 0 | .367 | 22 | – | 32 | – | 0 | .407 |
| Washington ‍‍‍ | 10 | – | 20 | – | 0 | .333 | 19 | – | 31 | – | 1 | .382 |
| Washington State ‍‍‍ | 9 | – | 21 | – | 0 | .300 | 21 | – | 32 | – | 0 | .396 |
| UCLA ‍‍‍ | 9 | – | 21 | – | 0 | .300 | 19 | – | 33 | – | 0 | .365 |
† – Conference champion ‡ – Tournament champion y – Invited to the NCAA Tournament; As of May 25, 2024; Rankings from D1Baseball

The 2024 Arizona Wildcats baseball team represented the University of Arizona during the 2024 NCAA Division I baseball season. The Wildcats played their home games for the 13th season at Hi Corbett Field. The team was coached by Chip Hale in his 3rd season at Arizona. This marked Arizona's 45th and final season participating as members of the Pac-12 Conference before they will join the Big 12 Conference beginning in 2025. In the final game of the regular season on May 18th the Wildcats clinched the last ever Pac-12 regular season championship by defeating 2nd-place Oregon State 4-3 in walk-off fashion, giving the program their 1st regular season championship since 2021.

== Previous season ==
The Wildcats finished the 2023 season with a record of 33–26 (12–18 Conf.), tied for 8th place in conference play. In the Pac-12 Conference Baseball Tournament in Scottsdale, AZ, the Wildcats defeated Arizona State, Oregon State and #1 seed Stanford to advance to the championship game, before falling to Oregon 4–5. The team subsequently was selected to the postseason for a third consecutive season for the first time since 2010–2012. They were placed in the Fayetteville Regional where they went 0–2, losing to TCU and Santa Clara to end their season.

== Preseason ==
During the offseason, the Wildcats participated in 5 fall exhibition games. On October 5 the team participated in the Mexican Baseball Fiesta held at Tucson's Kino Veterans Memorial Stadium, defeating the Naranjeros de Hermosillo of the Mexican Pacific League 3–1; this marked the program's first ever victory in the Fiesta. Arizona next played a doubleheader against Pima Community College on October 14 at Hi Corbett Field, winning the first 10–5 but losing the second 2–4. The Wildcats concluded the preseason on October 21 with 14–5 and 9–1 wins over Central Arizona College in a doubleheader at Hi Corbett Field.

== Personnel ==
=== Roster ===
2024 Arizona Wildcats baseball roster
| Pitchers • 13 - Carson Johnson - Freshman • 16 - Casey Hintz - Sophomore • 17 - Owen Kramkowski - Freshman • 22 - Jackson Kent - Sophomore • 25 - Jaeden Swanberg - Senior • 27 - Dawson Netz - Senior • 28 - Matthew Martinez - Junior • 29 - Eric Orloff - Junior • 30 - Josh Morano - Freshman • 34 - Anthony Susac - Junior • 35 - Bryce McKnight - Freshman • 37 - Tony Pluta - Sophomore • 38 - Cam Walty - Senior • 40 - Kenan Elarton - Freshman • 44 - Clark Candiotti - Senior • 45 - Alessandro Castro - Sophomore • 47 - Kyler Heyne - Junior • 48 - Bradon Zastrow - Senior • 49 - Raul Garayzar - Junior • 51 - Trevor Long - Senior | Catchers • 2 - Blake McDonald - Senior • 18 - Adonys Guzman - Sophomore • 52 - Kincaid Bergthold - Freshman Infielders • 1 - Garen Caulfield - Junior • 3 - Andrew Cain - Freshman • 7 - Richie Morales - Junior • 10 - Xavier Esquer - Freshman • 24 - Mason White - Sophomore • 33 - Nico Newhan - Freshman • 33 - Maddox Mihalakis - Sophomore | Outfielders • 4 - Brendan Summerhill - Sophomore • 8 - Brandon Rogers - Sophomore • 11 - Emilio Corona - Senior • 12 - Easton Breyfogle - Freshman • 23 - TJ Adams - Freshman Utility • 5 - Cole Dillon - Junior • 14 - Kade Huff - Freshman • 20 - Tommy Splaine - Junior • 36 - Zach Plasschaert - Freshman |

=== Coaches ===
2024 Arizona Wildcats baseball coaching staff
- Chip Hale - Head coach
- Trip Couch - Assistant coach
- Kevin Vance - Assistant coach
- Toby Demello - Volunteer assistant coach

=== Opening day ===
Opening Day Starters
| Name | Position |
|---|---|
| Brendan Summerhill | Left fielder |
| Mason White | Shortstop |
| Tommy Splaine | First baseman |
| Emilio Corona | Right fielder |
| Garen Caulfield | Second baseman |
| Adonys Guzman | Catcher |
| Easton Breyfogle | Center fielder |
| Andrew Cain | Designated hitter |
| Richie Morales | Third baseman |
| Jackson Kent | Starting pitcher |

== Schedule and results ==
2024 Arizona Wildcats baseball game log
Regular season
| Date | Opponent | Rank | Site/Stadium | Score | Win | Loss | Save | Overall Record | Pac-12 Record |
|---|---|---|---|---|---|---|---|---|---|
| Feb 16 | #23 Northeastern | | Hi Corbett Field • Tucson, AZ | W 6–1 | Kent (1–0) | Scotti (0–1) | Garayzar (1) | 1–0 | |
| Feb 17 | #23 Northeastern | | Hi Corbett Field • Tucson, AZ | L 7–8 | Gemma (1–0) | Long (0–1) | None | 1–1 | |
| Feb 18 | #23 Northeastern | | Hi Corbett Field • Tucson, AZ | W 9–3 | Walty (1–0) | Cabral (0–1) | None | 2–1 | |
| Feb 20 | Utah Tech | | Hi Corbett Field • Tucson, AZ | W 24–4 | Orloff (1–0) | West (0–1) | None | 3–1 | |
| Feb 23 | at San Diego | | Fowler Park • San Diego, CA | L 8–10 | Schapira (1–0) | Garayzar (0–1) | None | 3–2 | |
| Feb 24 | at San Diego | | Fowler Park • San Diego, CA | L 4–6 | Frize (2–0) | Zastrow (0–1) | Smith (1) | 3–3 | |
| Feb 25 | at San Diego | | Fowler Park • San Diego, CA | W 10–9 | Walty (2–0) | Schrier (0–2) | Hintz (1) | 4–3 | |
| Feb 28 | at #5 TCU | | Lupton Stadium • Fort Worth, TX | L 1–6 | Sloan (3–0) | Garayzar (0–2) | None | 4–4 | |
| Mar 1 | vs. #25 Dallas Baptist | | Riders Field • Frisco, TX | L 3–4 | Ridings (1–0) | Orloff (1–1) | Wilson (1) | 4–5 | |
| Mar 2 | vs. #16 Alabama | | Riders Field • Frisco, TX | L 6–7 | Davis II (1–0) | Swanberg (0–1) | Heiberger (1) | 4–6 | |
| Mar 3 | vs. #20 Indiana | | Riders Field • Frisco, TX | W 12–1 | Walty (3–0) | Holderfield (1–1) | None | 5–6 | |
| Mar 8 | at USC | | Great Park • Irvine, CA | W 16–9 | Kent (2–0) | Aoki (0–3) | None | 6–6 | 1–0 |
| Mar 9 | at USC | | Great Park • Irvine, CA | W 9–6 | Candiotti (1–0) | Stromsborg (0–3) | None | 7–6 | 2–0 |
| Mar 10 | at USC | | Great Park • Irvine, CA | L 1–4 | Hammond (1–2) | Walty (3–1) | Blum (2) | 7–7 | 2–1 |
| Mar 11 | at Loyola Marymount | | George C. Page Stadium • Los Angeles, CA | L 2–9 | Baker (1–0) | Susac (0–1) | None | 7–8 | |
| Mar 15 | Arizona State | - | Hi Corbett Field • Tucson, AZ | L 2–3 | Jacobs (1–1) | Orloff (1–2) | None | 7–9 | 2–2 |
| Mar 16 | Arizona State | | Hi Corbett Field • Tucson, AZ | L 0–4 | Markl (1–0) | Candiotti (1–1) | Schiefer (1) | 7–10 | 2–3 |
| Mar 17 | Arizona State | | Hi Corbett Field • Tucson, AZ | W 14–3 | Long (1–1) | Behrens (2–2) | None | 8–10 | 3–3 |
| Mar 19 | Grand Canyon | | Hi Corbett Field • Tucson, AZ | W 6–4 | Heyne (1–0) | Smith (0–2) | Hintz (2) | 9–10 | |
| Mar 22 | at Oregon | | PK Park • Eugene, OR | L 1–2 | Gordon (2–2) | Kent (2–1) | Mercado (4) | 9–11 | 3–4 |
| Mar 23 | at Oregon | | PK Park • Eugene, OR | L 2–3 | Mullan (4–0) | Hintz (0–1) | None | 9–12 | 3–5 |
| Mar 24 | at Oregon | | PK Park • Eugene, OR | W 15–4 | Walty (4–1) | Seitter (2–1) | None | 10–12 | 4–5 |
| Mar 26 | New Mexico State | | Hi Corbett Field • Tucson, AZ | L 9–12 | Lewis (2–2) | Susac (0–2) | None | 10–13 | |
| Mar 28 | UCLA | | Hi Corbett Field • Tucson, AZ | W 5–3 | Hintz (1–1) | Egan (0–1) | None | 11–13 | 5–5 |
| Mar 29 | UCLA | | Hi Corbett Field • Tucson, AZ | W 3–2 | Candiotti (2–1) | Ruff (1–2) | None | 12–13 | 6–5 |
| Mar 30 | UCLA | | Hi Corbett Field • Tucson, AZ | W 10–9 | Netz (1–0) | Ruff (1–3) | None | 13–13 | 7–5 |
| Apr 2 | New Mexico | | Hi Corbett Field • Tucson, AZ | W 9–1 | Netz (2–0) | Barnhouse (1–2) | None | 14–13 | |
| Apr 5 | at California | | Stu Gordon Stadium • Berkeley, CA | W 5–3 | Hintz (2–1) | Stasiowski (2–1) | Pluta (1) | 15–13 | 8–5 |
| Apr 6 | at California | | Stu Gordon Stadium • Berkeley, CA | W 5–0 | Walty (5–1) | Newmann (0–4) | None | 16–13 | 9–5 |
| Apr 7 | at California | | Stu Gordon Stadium • Berkeley, CA | W 7–3 | Candiotti (3–1) | Boone (1–1) | None | 17–13 | 10–5 |
| Apr 8 | at Stanford | | Sunken Diamond • Palo Alto, CA | W 12–1 | Zastrow (1–1) | Speshyock (0–1) | None | 18–13 | |
| Apr 12 | Louisiana Tech | | Hi Corbett Field • Tucson, AZ | W 9–1 | Kent (3–1) | Smith (4–3) | None | 19–13 | |
| Apr 13 | Louisiana Tech | | Hi Corbett Field • Tucson, AZ | W 6–5 | Swanberg (1–1) | Bates (1–1) | None | 20–13 | |
| Apr 14 | Louisiana Tech | | Hi Corbett Field • Tucson, AZ | W 5–2 | Walty (6–1) | Swistak (4–2) | Pluta (2) | 21–13 | |
| Apr 16 | at Grand Canyon | #21 | Brazell Field • Phoenix, AZ | L 4–5 | Webb (2–0) | Zastrow (1–2) | Watkins (1) | 21–14 | |
| Apr 19 | Washington State | #21 | Hi Corbett Field • Tucson, AZ | W 8–7 | Swanberg (2–1) | Brotherton (4–3) | None | 22–14 | 11–5 |
| Apr 20 | Washington State | #21 | Hi Corbett Field • Tucson, AZ | W 7–1 | Candiotti (4–1) | Wilford (3–5) | None | 23–14 | 12-5 |
| Apr 21 | Washington State | #21 | Hi Corbett Field • Tucson, AZ | W 7–6 | Pluta (1–0) | Brotherton (4–4) | None | 24–14 | 13–5 |
| Apr 24 | at New Mexico State | #16 | Presley Askew Field • Las Cruces, NM | W 12–2 | McKnight (1–0) | Baltus (0–1) | None | 25–14 | |
| Apr 26 | at Washington | #16 | Husky Ballpark • Seattle, WA | W 3–2 | Heyne (2–0) | Yeager (2–1) | Susac (1) | 26–14 | 14–5 |
| Apr 27 | at Washington | #16 | Husky Ballpark • Seattle, WA | L 3–4 | Kirchoff (3–3) | Candiotti (4–2) | Cunningham (1) | 26–15 | 14–6 |
| Apr 28 | at Washington | #16 | Husky Ballpark • Seattle, WA | L 8–9 | Boyle (2–2) | Orloff (1–3) | None | 26–16 | 14–7 |
| Apr 30 | Grand Canyon | #21 | Hi Corbett Field • Tucson, AZ | L 8–24 | Webb (3–0) | Pluta (1–1) | None | 26–17 | |
| May 3 | Stanford | #21 | Hi Corbett Field • Tucson, AZ | W 12–8 | Heyne (3–0) | Scott (4–7) | None | 27–17 | 15–7 |
| May 4 | Stanford | #21 | Hi Corbett Field • Tucson, AZ | W 5–0 | Candiotti (5–2) | Lim (4–5) | None | 28–17 | 16–7 |
| May 5 | Stanford | #21 | Hi Corbett Field • Tucson, AZ | W 7–2 | Walty (7–1) | Dugan (3–4) | None | 29–17 | 17–7 |
| May 7 | at Arizona State | #17 | Phoenix Municipal Stadium • Phoenix, AZ | W 5–3 | Hintz (3–1) | Halvorson (1–4) | Susac (2) | 30–17 | |
| May 10 | at Utah | #17 | Smith's Ballpark • Salt Lake City, UT | L 1–6 | Kent (3–2) | Van Sickle (4–1) | None | 30–18 | 17–8 |
| May 11 | at Utah | #17 | Smith's Ballpark • Salt Lake City, UT | W 8–4 | Candiotti (6–2) | Jones (3–4) | None | 31–18 | 18–8 |
| May 12 | at Utah | #17 | Smith's Ballpark • Salt Lake City, UT | W 10–4 | Walty (8–1) | McAnelly (3–5) | None | 32–18 | 19–8 |
| May 16 | #6 Oregon State | #14 | Hi Corbett Field • Tucson, AZ | L 2–9 | May (6–0) | Kent (3–3) | None | 32–19 | 19–9 |
| May 17 | #6 Oregon State | #14 | Hi Corbett Field • Tucson, AZ | L 1–16 | Kmatz (6–2) | Candiotti (6–3) | None | 32–20 | 19–10 |
| May 18 | #6 Oregon State | #14 | Hi Corbett Field • Tucson, AZ | W 4–3 | Susac (1–2) | Holmes (4–3) | None | 33–20 | 20–10 |
Pac-12 Conference Tournament
| May 22 | (9) Washington | (1) #18 | Scottsdale Stadium • Scottsdale, AZ | W 6–5 | Pluta (2–1) | Engman (0–8) | Susac (3) | 34–20 | |
| May 23 | (6) California | (1) #18 | Scottsdale Stadium • Scottsdale, AZ | L 5–7 | Short (6–2) | Kent (3–4) | Becerra (4) | 34–21 | |
| May 24 | (8) Stanford | (1) #18 | Scottsdale Stadium • Scottsdale, AZ | W 6–3 | Candiotti (7–3) | Scott (4–10) | None | 35–21 | |
| May 25 | (4) USC | (1) #18 | Scottsdale Stadium • Scottsdale, AZ | W 4–3 | Susac (2–2) | Blum (2–1) | None | 36–21 | |
NCAA Tucson Regional
| May 31 | (4) Grand Canyon | (1) #13 | Hi Corbett Field • Tucson, AZ | L 4–9 | Richardson (5–1) | Candiotti (7–4) | Lyon (1) | 36–22 | |
| Jun 1 | (2) Dallas Baptist | (1) #13 | Hi Corbett Field • Tucson, AZ | L 0–7 | DeBerry (7–1) | Walty (8–2) | None | 36–23 | |

=== Tucson Regional ===
Tucson Regional Teams
| (1) Arizona Wildcats | (4) Grand Canyon Antelopes | (2) Dallas Baptist Patriots | (3) West Virginia Mountaineers |

== 2024 MLB draft ==
| Player | Position | Round | Overall | MLB team |
|---|---|---|---|---|
| Jackson Kent | LHP | 4 | 108 | Washington Nationals |
| Clark Candiotti | RHP | 4 | 135 | San Diego Padres |
| Anthony Susac | RHP | 8 | 255 | Texas Rangers |
| Cam Walty | RHP | 20 | 595 | Cleveland Guardians |
