= 2024 UC Irvine Anteaters baseball team =

American college baseball season

2024 UC Irvine Anteaters baseball

Dodger Stadium College Baseball Classic champions

Corvallis Regional, 2–2
- Conference: Big West Conference

Ranking
- Coaches: No. 25
- D1Baseball.com: No. 23
- Record: 45–14 (22–8 Big West)
- Head coach: Ben Orloff (6th season)
- Assistant coaches: Ryan Johnston (2nd season); Erich Pfohl (1st season); CJ Yogi (1st season)
- Hitting coach: J.T. Bloodworth (5th season)
- Pitching coach: Daniel Bibona (11th season)
- MVP: Myles Smith
- Home stadium: Cicerone Field

2024 Big West Conference baseball standings
	Conf.						Overall
Team	W		L		T	PCT	W		L		T	PCT
No. 19 UC Santa Barbara ‍†‍‍^{y}	26	–	4	–	0	.867	44	–	14	–	0	.759
No. 23 UC Irvine ‍‍‍^{y}	22	–	8	–	0	.733	45	–	14	–	0	.763
Hawai'i ‍‍‍	20	–	10	–	0	.667	37	–	16	–	0	.698
Cal Poly ‍‍‍	20	–	10	–	0	.667	35	–	22	–	0	.614
UC San Diego* ‍‍‍	17	–	13	–	0	.567	30	–	23	–	0	.566
Cal State Northridge ‍‍‍	16	–	14	–	0	.533	30	–	24	–	0	.556
UC Davis ‍‍‍	13	–	17	–	0	.433	29	–	27	–	0	.518
Long Beach State ‍‍‍	10	–	20	–	0	.333	25	–	29	–	1	.464
Cal State Bakersfield ‍‍‍	8	–	22	–	0	.267	15	–	38	–	0	.283
Cal State Fullerton ‍‍‍	7	–	23	–	0	.233	16	–	38	–	0	.296
UC Riverside ‍‍‍	6	–	24	–	0	.200	16	–	36	–	0	.308
† – Conference champion y – Invited to the NCAA tournament * Ineligible for the 2024 NCAA tournament due to transition from Division II; As of June 24, 2024; Rankings from D1Baseball

The 2024 UC Irvine Anteaters baseball team represented the University of California, Irvine during the 2024 NCAA Division I baseball season. The Anteaters played their home games at Cicerone Field as a member of the Big West Conference. They were led by head coach Ben Orloff, in his sixth season as manager.

== Previous season ==
UC Irvine came off a 38–17 (19–11) season. The Anteaters finished fourth in the Big West Conference, but did not receive an at-large berth to the 2023 NCAA Division I baseball tournament.

== Preseason ==
=== Preseason Big West awards and honors ===
Preseason All-Big West Team
Player	No.	Position	Class
Dub Gleed	4	3B	Junior
Caden Kendle	5	OF	Senior
Anthony Martinez	55	1B	Sophomore

=== Coaches poll ===
The coaches poll was released on February 9, 2024. UC Irvine was picked to finish second in the conference and received two first-place votes.

Coaches' Poll
Pos.	Team	Points
1	UCSB	99 (9)
2	UC Irvine	89 (2)
3	UC San Diego	78
4	Hawaii	70
5	CSUN	65
6	Cal State Fullerton	59
7	Cal Poly	46
8	Long Beach State	42
9	UC Davis	25
10	Cal State Bakersfield	21
11	UC Riverside	11

== Personnel ==
=== Starters ===
Lineup
Pos.	No.	Player.	Year
C	8	Thomas McCaffrey	Senior
1B	55	Anthony Martinez	Sophomore
2B	16	Will Bermudez	RS-Junior
3B	1	Jo Oyama	Senior
SS	2	Woody Hadeen	RS-Junior
LF	5	Caden Kendle	Senior
CF	11	Myles Smith	Junior
RF	26	Chase Call	Junior
DH	4	Dub Gleed	Junior

Weekend pitching rotation
Day	No.	Player.	Year
Friday	13	Nick Pinto	Graduate
Saturday	28	Trevor Hansen	Freshman
Sunday	27	Brandon Luu	Freshman

=== Roster ===
2024 UC Irvine Anteaters baseball team
Players
Coaches

#	Pos.	Name	B/T	Height	Weight	Year	Home town
1	INF	Jo Oyama	L/R	5 ft 6 in (1.68 m)	165 lb (75 kg)	Sr	Okinawa, JPN
2	INF	Woody Hadeen	S/R	6 ft 2 in (1.88 m)	195 lb (88 kg)	RS Jr	Temecula, CA
4	INF	Dub Gleed	R/R	6 ft 1 in (1.85 m)	200 lb (91 kg)	Jr	Ladera Ranch, CA
5	OF	Caden Kendle	R/R	5 ft 11 in (1.8 m)	200 lb (91 kg)	Sr	Huntington Beach, CA
7	OF	Jacob Stinson	L/R	6 ft 1 in (1.85 m)	190 lb (86 kg)	Sr	Pleasanton, CA
8	C	Thomas McCaffrey	R/R	5 ft 11 in (1.8 m)	205 lb (93 kg)	Sr	Santa Monica, CA
10	OF	Luke Spillane	R/R	6 ft 0 in (1.83 m)	195 lb (88 kg)	Gr	Trabuco Canyon, CA
11	OF	Myles Smith	L/R	6 ft 1 in (1.85 m)	205 lb (93 kg)	Jr	Torrance, CA
12	RHP	David Utagawa	R/R	6 ft 4 in (1.93 m)	230 lb (104 kg)	RS Jr	Phoenix, AZ
13	LHP	Nick Pinto	L/L	6 ft 0 in (1.83 m)	185 lb (84 kg)	Gr	Coto de Caza, CA
14	RHP	Danny Suarez	R/R	6 ft 4 in (1.93 m)	205 lb (93 kg)	Jr	Trabuco Canyon, CA
15	RHP	Finnegan Wall	R/R	6 ft 2 in (1.88 m)	205 lb (93 kg)	Jr	Hesperia, CA
16	INF	Will Bermudez	S/R	5 ft 10 in (1.78 m)	175 lb (79 kg)	RS Jr	Whittier, CA
17	RHP	Riley Kelly	R/R	6 ft 5 in (1.96 m)	215 lb (98 kg)	So	Santa Ana, CA
18	RHP	Ricky Tibbett	R/R	6 ft 2 in (1.88 m)	190 lb (86 kg)	Gr	Chula Vista, CA
20	RHP	Tim Grack	R/R	6 ft 1 in (1.85 m)	185 lb (84 kg)	Fr	Fountain Valley, CA
21	INF	Landon Gaz	R/R	6 ft 2 in (1.88 m)	230 lb (104 kg)	Fr	Moorpark, CA
22	RHP	Cameron Wheeler	R/R	6 ft 1 in (1.85 m)	185 lb (84 kg)	Gr	Chino Hills, CA
23	INF	Frankie Carney	L/R	5 ft 11 in (1.8 m)	180 lb (82 kg)	RS Fr	San Diego, CA
24	INF	Auggie Gutierrez	R/R	5 ft 11 in (1.8 m)	180 lb (82 kg)	RS Fr	Yorba Linda, CA
25	INF	James Castagnola	R/R	6 ft 1 in (1.85 m)	190 lb (86 kg)	RS Fr	San Diego, CA
26	OF	Chase Call	R/R	6 ft 2 in (1.88 m)	210 lb (95 kg)	Jr	Porter Ranch, CA
27	LHP	Brandon Luu	L/L	6 ft 2 in (1.88 m)	220 lb (100 kg)	Fr	Irvine, CA
28	RHP	Trevor Hansen	R/R	6 ft 2 in (1.88 m)	195 lb (88 kg)	Fr	Simi Valley, CA
30	OF	Trevor Wilson	R/R	6 ft 2 in (1.88 m)	185 lb (84 kg)	Fr	Fresno, CA
31	RHP	Dante Zamudio	R/R	6 ft 1 in (1.85 m)	190 lb (86 kg)	Jr	Los Angeles, CA
32	RHP	David Vizcaino	R/R	6 ft 3 in (1.91 m)	225 lb (102 kg)	RS Jr	Chino, CA
33	RHP	Max Martin	R/R	6 ft 5 in (1.96 m)	190 lb (86 kg)	So	Los Angeles, CA
34	C	Abraham Garcia-Pacheco	R/R	6 ft 0 in (1.83 m)	200 lb (91 kg)	Sr	Highland, CA
35	RHP	Michael Pirrello	R/R	6 ft 2 in (1.88 m)	180 lb (82 kg)	Sr	Los Alamitos, CA
36	RHP	Andrew Grove	R/R	6 ft 4 in (1.93 m)	210 lb (95 kg)	So	Orange, CA
37	C	Holt Williams	R/R	6 ft 4 in (1.93 m)	220 lb (100 kg)	Fr	Camas, WA
38	INF	Lucas Scott	R/R	6 ft 0 in (1.83 m)	175 lb (79 kg)	Fr	Long Beach, CA
39	RHP	David Butler	R/R	6 ft 2 in (1.88 m)	180 lb (82 kg)	Jr	Riverside, CA
40	C	Blake Penso	R/R	6 ft 3 in (1.91 m)	230 lb (104 kg)	Jr	Huntington Beach, CA
41	RHP	Elliot Joslin	R/R	6 ft 6 in (1.98 m)	225 lb (102 kg)	So	Los Angeles, CA
42	LHP	Ryder Brooks	L/L	6 ft 2 in (1.88 m)	195 lb (88 kg)	RS Fr	Fountain Valley, CA
43	LHP	Ricky Ojeda	L/L	5 ft 11 in (1.8 m)	170 lb (77 kg)	Fr	Valencia, CA
44	LHP	Nick Rincover	L/L	6 ft 2 in (1.88 m)	210 lb (95 kg)	Gr	West Hills, CA
55	INF	Anthony Martinez	L/R	6 ft 3 in (1.91 m)	230 lb (104 kg)	So	Fairfield, CA

Head coach

Ben Orloff

Assistant coach(es)

Daniel Bibona
J.T. Bloodworth
Ryan Johnston

Legend

- (C) Team captain
- (S) Suspended
- (I) Ineligible
- Injured
- Current redshirt

Roster
Last update: May 19, 2024

== Game log ==
2024 UC Irvine Anteaters baseball game log (45–14)
Regular season (43–12)

February (6–0)
Date	TV	Opponent	Rank	Stadium	Score	Win	Loss	Save	Attendance	Overall	BWC
February 16	ESPN+	North Dakota State*	No. 25	Cicerone Field; Irvine, California	W 14–2	Pinto (1–0)	Puetz (0–1)	None	826	1–0	—
February 17	ESPN+	North Dakota State*	No. 25	Cicerone Field	W 7–2	Luu (1–0)	Knight (0–1)	None	745	2–0	—
February 18	ESPN+	North Dakota State*	No. 25	Cicerone Field	W 10–4	Brooks (1–0)	Koenig (0–1)	None	718	3–0	—
February 20	KUCI	San Diego*	No. 25	Cicerone Field	Canceled (inclement weather)					3–0	—
February 23	ESPN+	at Tulane*	No. 25	Turchin Stadium; New Orleans, Louisiana	W 5–4	Pinto (2–0)	Saum (0–2)	Tibbett (1)	1,692	4–0	—
February 24	ESPN+	at Tulane*	No. 25	Turchin Stadium	W 11–4	Luu (2–0)	Cehajić (0–1)	Ojeda (1)	2,005	5–0	—
February 25	ESPN+	at Tulane*	No. 25	Turchin Stadium	W 10–7	Hansen (1–0)	Lombardi (0–1)	None	1,692	6–0	—

March (16–3)
Date	TV	Opponent	Rank	Stadium	Score	Win	Loss	Save	Attendance	Overall	BWC
Dodger Stadium College Baseball Classic
March 1	ESPN+	San Diego*	No. 23	Cicerone Field	W 3–1	Pinto (3–0)	Randall (0–1)	Tibbett (2)	856	7–0	—
March 2	ESPN+	Michigan*	No. 23	Cicerone Field	W 12–4	Wheeler (1–0)	Denner (1–2)	Martin (1)	896	8–0	—
March 3	MLBN	vs. UCLA*	No. 23	Dodger Stadium; Los Angeles, California	W 5–2	Ojeda (1–0)	Rodriguez (0–1)	Tibbett (3)	4,617	9–0	—
March 5	ESPN+	Cal Baptist*	No. 22	Cicerone Field	W 13–4	Luu (3–0)	Wilson (0–2)	Tibbett (4)	738	10–0	—
March 7	MWN	at Fresno State*	No. 22	Pete Beiden Field; Fresno, California	W 13–4	Brooks (2–0)	Dixon (2–1)	None	1,658	11–0	—
March 8 (Note: Part of a doubleheader.)	KUCI	vs. Columbia*	No. 22	Pete Beiden Field	W 32–2	Pierrello (1–0)	Sheets (0–2)	None	1,239	12–0	—
March 8	MWN	at Fresno State*	No. 22	Pete Beiden Field	L 1–13	Beal (1–2)	Pinto (3–1)	None	1,239	12–1	—
March 9	KUCI	vs. Columbia*	No. 22	Pete Beiden Field	W 25–7	Hansen (2–0)	Edwards (0–1)	None	1,438	13–1	—
March 13	ESPN+	UConn*	No. 19	Cicerone Field	L 0–5	Schild (2–0)	Vizcaino (0–1)	None	622	13–2	—
March 15	ESPN+	UC Davis	No. 19	Cicerone Field	W 1–0	Tibbett (1–0)	Delaney (1–1)	None	831	14–2	1–0
March 16	ESPN+	UC Davis	No. 19	Cicerone Field	W 6–1	Ojeda (2–0)	Valdez (1–1)	None	700	15–2	2–0
March 17	ESPN+	UC Davis	No. 19	Cicerone Field	L 10–12^{11}	Woolridge (1–0)	Wheeler (1–1)	None	956	15–3	2–1
March 22	ESPN+	Cal State Bakersfield	No. 24	Cicerone Field	W 10–3	Pinto (4–1)	Verdugo (0–3)	None	846	16–3	3–1
March 23	ESPN+	Cal State Bakersfield	No. 24	Cicerone Field	W 12–4	Hansen (3–0)	Gutierrez (0–2)	None	586	17–3	4–1
March 24	ESPN+	Cal State Bakersfield	No. 24	Cicerone Field	W 3–2^{12}	Utagawa (1–0)	Grosjean (1–3)	None	591	18–3	5–1
March 26	ESPN+	at Loyola Marymount*	No. 20	George C. Page Stadium; Los Angeles, California	W 10–9^{11}	Pierrello (2–0)	Kershaw (1–1)	Zamudio (1)	307	19–3	—
March 28	ESPN+	at Hawaii	No. 20	Les Murakami Stadium; Honolulu, Hawaii	W 6–3	Pinto (5–1)	Giroux (3–1)	Tibbett (5)	3,291	20–3	6–1
March 29	ESPN+	at Hawaii	No. 20	Les Murakami Stadium	W 12–8	Rincover (1–0)	Abshier (1–2)	Tibbett (6)	4,159	21–3	7–1
March 30	ESPN+	at Hawaii	No. 20	Les Murakami Stadium	W 12–5	Ojeda (3–0)	Magdaleno (1–2)	None	3,324	22–3	8–1

April (11–5)
Date	TV	Opponent	Rank	Stadium	Score	Win	Loss	Save	Attendance	Overall	BWC
April 5	ESPN+	No. 23 UCSB	No. 16	Cicerone Field	W 9–3	Pinto (6–1)	Gallagher (2–1)	None	772	23–3	9–1
April 6	ESPN+	No. 23 UCSB	No. 16	Cicerone Field	L 4–5	Gutierrez (5–0)	Hansen (3–1)	Flora (4)	1,327	23–4	9–2
April 7	ESPN+	No. 23 UCSB	No. 16	Cicerone Field	W 11–4	Luu (4–0)	Ager (2–3)	None	1,036	24–4	10–2
April 9	P12N	at USC*	No. 12	George C. Page Stadium (Note: Game will be played at George C. Page Stadium instead of USC's main field, Dedeaux Field, due to a scheduling conflict. USC will still be the designated home team.)	L 5–12	Johnson (3–0)	Grack (0–1)	None	374	24–5	—
April 12	ESPN+	at UC San Diego	No. 12	Triton Ballpark; La Jolla, California	L 4–15	Eyanson (5–1)	Pinto (6–2)	None	500	24–6	10–3
April 13	ESPN+	at UC San Diego	No. 12	Triton Ballpark	W 16–3	Hansen (4–1)	Ernisse (1–2)	Martin (2)	426	25–6	11–3
April 14	ESPN+	at UC San Diego	No. 12	Triton Ballpark	L 9–10	I. Martinez (3–1)	Tibbett (1–1)	None	524	25–7	11–4
April 17	ESPN+	USC*	No. 15	Cicerone Field	L 4–12	Ebner (2–0)	Brooks (2–1)	None	955	25–8	—
April 19	ESPN+	San Diego State*	No. 15	Cicerone Field	W 4–3	Pinto (7–2)	Riordan (3–4)	Tibbett (7)	920	26–8	—
April 20	MWN	at San Diego State*	No. 15	Tony Gwynn Stadium; San Diego, California	W 9–8	Utagawa (7–2)	Miranda (1–1)	Tibbett (8)	1,044	27–8	—
April 21	ESPN+	San Diego State	No. 15	Cicerone Field	W 7–6^{10}	Tibbett (2–1)	Canada (0–4)	None	1,203	28–8	—
April 23	P12N	at UCLA*	No. 12	Jackie Robinson Stadium; Los Angeles, California	W 9–7	Martin (1–0)	Ruff (2–4)	Utagawa (1)	680	29–8	—
April 26	KUCI	at UC Riverside	No. 12	Ballpark at RSC; Riverside, California	W 15–1	Pinto (8–2)	Capacete (0–6)	None	269	30–8	12–4
April 27	KUCI	at UC Riverside	No. 12	Ballpark at RSC	W 15–7	Hansen (5–1)	Flores (0–6)	None	276	31–8	13–4
April 28	KUCI	at UC Riverside	No. 12	Ballpark at RSC	W 12–3	Luu (5–0)	Andrunas (1–1)	None	227	32–8	14–4
April 30	ESPN+	at San Diego*	No. 9	Fowler Park; San Diego, California	W 8–4	Grack (1–1)	Kysar (1–1)	None	473	33–8	—

May (10–4)
Date	TV	Opponent	Rank	Stadium	Score	Win	Loss	Save	Attendance	Overall	BWC
May 3	ESPN+	Cal Poly	No. 9	Cicerone Field	L 5–10	Wright (7–2)	Ojeda (3–1)	None	874	33–9	14–5
May 4	ESPN+	Cal Poly	No. 9	Cicerone Field	W 4–3 (10)	Tibbett (3–1)	Baum (2–4)	None	904	34–9	15–5
May 5	ESPN+	Cal Poly	No. 9	Cicerone Field	L 2–11	Volmerding (1–0)	Luu (5–1)	None	1,036	34–10	15–6
May 7	ESPN+	UCLA*	No. 16	Cicerone Field	W 9–6	Ojeda (4–1)	Stump (0–5)	None	1,990	35–10	—
May 10	ESPN+	at Long Beach State	No. 16	Blair Field; Long Beach, California	W 18–3	Pinto (9–2)	Geiss (3–3)	None	2,403	36–10	16–6
May 11	ESPN+	at Long Beach State	No. 16	Blair Field	W 11–2	Hansen (5–1)	Larson (2–1)	None	2,110	37–10	17–6
May 12	ESPN+	at Long Beach State	No. 16	Blair Field	W 7–1	Grack (2–1)	Montgomery (3–3)	None	1,522	38–10	18–6
May 14	ESPN+	Loyola Marymount*	No. 13	Cicerone Field	W 7–2	Kelly (1–0)	Caycedo (0–2)	None	731	39–10	—
May 17	ESPN+	at Cal State Fullerton	No. 13	Goodwin Field; Fullerton, California	W 10–6 (12)	Tibbett (4–1)	Jones (0–2)	None	1,062	40–10	19–6
May 18	ESPN+	at Cal State Fullerton	No. 13	Goodwin Field	L 2–9	Rodriguez (3–7)	Hansen (5–2)	None	1,018	40–11	19–7
May 19	ESPN+	at Cal State Fullerton	No. 13	Goodwin Field	W 18–4	Kelly (2–0)	Wright (1–6)	None	851	41–11	20–7
May 23	ESPN+	CSUN	No. 13	Cicerone Field	W 5–2	Ojeda (5–1)	Pallares (0–3)	Tibbett (9)	976	42–11	21–7
May 24	ESPN+	CSUN	No. 13	Cicerone Field	L 9–14	Halamicek (6–3)	Hansen (6–3)	None	843	42–12	21–8
May 25	ESPN+	CSUN	No. 13	Cicerone Field	W 14–9	Kelly (3–0)	Wentz (0–3)	Tibbett (10)	1,156	43–12	22–8

Postseason (2-2)

NCAA Regionals (2-2)
Date	TV	Opponent	Rank	Stadium	Score	Win	Loss	Save	Attendance	Overall	Postseason Record
May 31	ESPN+	vs. Nicholls (3)	No. 21	Goss Stadium; Corvallis, Oregon	13-12	Utagawa (3-0)	Desandro (6-5)	None	3,893	44-12	1-0
June 1	ESPN+	vs. No. 7 Oregon State (1)	No. 21	Goss Stadium	L 3-5	Kmatz (7-2)	Hansen (6–4)	Holmes (13)	4,224	44–13	1-1
June 2	ESPN+	vs. Tulane (4)	No. 21	Goss Stadium; Corvallis, Oregon	17-7	Ojeda (6-1)	Price (3-3)	Vizcaino (1)	3,880	45-13	2-1
June 2	ESPN+	vs. No. 7 Oregon State (1)	No. 21	Goss Stadium	L 6-11	Hutcheson (4-2)	Utagawa (3-1)	None	4,134	45-14	2-2

Legend: = Win = Loss = Canceled
Bold =UC Irvine team member
Rankings are based on the team's current ranking in the D1Baseball poll.

Schedule Notes

== Rankings ==
Ranking movements Legend: ██ Increase in ranking ██ Decrease in ranking — = Not ranked RV = Received votes
	Week																	
Poll	Pre	1	2	3	4	5	6	7	8	9	10	11	12	13	14	15	16	Final
Coaches'	RV	RV*	25	23	20	21	19	17	14	16	13	11	16	13	13	18	18*	25
Baseball America	25	21	20	19	19	19	16	14	11	15	14	12	18	17	17	20	20*	25
NCBWA†	—	RV	25	22	22	20	19	17	14	18	15	11	16	13	13	17	19	21
D1Baseball	—	—	—	23	22	24	20	16	12	17	12	9	16	15	14	21	21*	23
Perfect Game	—	—	—	22	22	23	20	19	14	18	16	10	17	12	13	13*	—	—

† NCBWA ranks 30 teams in their preseason poll, but only ranks 25 teams weekly during the season.
* A new poll was not released for this week, so for comparison purposes, the previous week's ranking is inserted in this week's slot.
