= 2024 Pac-12 Conference baseball tournament =

American college baseball tournament

- Teams: 9
- Format: See below
- Finals site: Scottsdale Stadium; Scottsdale, Arizona
- Champions: Arizona (1st title)
- Winning coach: Chip Hale (1st title)
- MVP: Mason White (Arizona)
- Attendance: 12,438
- Television: Pac-12 Network; ESPN2

2024 Pac-12 Conference baseball standings
	Conf.						Overall
Team	W		L		T	PCT	W		L		T	PCT
No. 25 Arizona ‍†‍‡‍^{y}	20	–	10	–	0	.667	36	–	23	–	0	.610
No. 10 Oregon State ‍‍‍^{y}	19	–	10	–	0	.655	42	–	14	–	0	.750
No. 12 Oregon ‍‍‍^{y}	19	–	11	–	0	.633	37	–	18	–	0	.673
USC ‍‍‍	17	–	12	–	0	.586	31	–	28	–	0	.525
California ‍‍‍	17	–	13	–	0	.567	36	–	19	–	0	.655
Arizona State ‍‍‍	17	–	13	–	0	.567	32	–	26	–	0	.552
Utah ‍‍‍	16	–	14	–	0	.533	33	–	22	–	0	.600
Stanford ‍‍‍	11	–	19	–	0	.367	22	–	32	–	0	.407
Washington ‍‍‍	10	–	20	–	0	.333	19	–	31	–	1	.382
Washington State ‍‍‍	9	–	21	–	0	.300	21	–	32	–	0	.396
UCLA ‍‍‍	9	–	21	–	0	.300	19	–	33	–	0	.365
† – Conference champion ‡ – Tournament champion y – Invited to the NCAA Tournament; As of May 25, 2024; Rankings from D1Baseball

The 2024 Pac-12 Conference baseball tournament was held from May 21 through 25 at Scottsdale Stadium in Scottsdale, Arizona. It was the third and final postseason championship event sponsored by the Pac-12 Conference since 1978. It was also the final Pac-12 Conference event before the conference's collapse; 10 of the previous 12 members left for other conferences that August.

In July 2026, the two legacy members, Oregon State and Washington State, were joined by new baseball-sponsoring full members Fresno State, Gonzaga, San Diego State, and Texas State, plus new baseball affiliate Dallas Baptist. The tournament is expected to resume in the 2027 season.

The Arizona Wildcats won the tournament and will receive the league's automatic bid to the 2024 NCAA Division I baseball tournament.

== Seeds ==
This tournament featured 9 of the conference's 11 baseball teams (Colorado does not field a baseball team) . Matchups consisted of three teams in each pool, with each team playing two games in pool play, with the three pool winners & one wild card team advancing to the single elimination finals. The winning percentage of the teams in conference play determined the tournament seedings. There are tiebreakers in place to seed teams with identical conference records.

Seed	School	Conf.	Over.	Tiebreaker
#1	Arizona	20–10	32–20	
#2	Oregon State	19–10	41–13	
#3	Oregon	19–11	37–16	
#4	USC	17–12	28–27	
#5	Arizona State	17–13	31–24	3–0 Vs California
#6	California	17–13	34–18	0–3 Vs Arizona State
#7	Utah	16–14	32–21	
#8	Stanford	11–19	20–32	
#9	Washington	10–20	19–29–1	

== Pools composition ==
There will be three teams in each pool, with each team playing two games in pool play. Teams selected for pool play will be based on final standings in the 2024 Pac-12 Regular Season. The Number 1, 6 & 9 seeds will be placed in pool A. The Number 2, 5 & 8 seeds will be placed in pool B. The Number 3, 4 & 7 seeds will be placed in pool C. The three pools will play a round-robin style tournament with the winners advancing to the Friday single-elimination semifinals along with one Wild Card team. The Wild Card will be determined by the best record of the non-advancing teams. Any tiebreaker will be awarded to the highest seeded team.

Pool A	Pool B	Pool C
#1 Arizona Wildcats	#2 Oregon State Beavers	#3 Oregon Ducks
#6 California Golden Bears	#5 Arizona State Sun Devils	#4 USC Trojans
#9 Washington Huskies	#8 Stanford Cardinal	#7 Utah Utes

=== Pool A ===
	Pool A	ARIZ	CAL	WASH
1	Arizona		5−7	6−5
6	California	7−5		12−0
9	Washington	5−6	0−12	

Pos	Team	Pld	W	L	RF	RA	RD	PCT	Qualification
1	(6) California	2	2	0	19	5	+14	1.000	Advanced to Semifinals
2	(1) Arizona	2	1	1	11	12	−1	.500	Advanced to Semifinals
3	(9) Washington	2	0	2	5	18	−13	.000	Eliminated

May 21; 7:00 p.m. Game 3	(9) Washington	0–12 (F/7)	(6) California	Scottsdale Stadium, Scottsdale, AZ; Attendance: 1,738; Umpires: HP: Angel Campos; 1B: Kellen Levy; 2B: Scott Letendre; 3B: Billy Van Raaphorst
May 21; 7:00 p.m. Game 3	LP: C. Kirchoff (4−5)	Box Score	WP: A. Galen (5−2)	Scottsdale Stadium, Scottsdale, AZ; Attendance: 1,738; Umpires: HP: Angel Campos; 1B: Kellen Levy; 2B: Scott Letendre; 3B: Billy Van Raaphorst
May 21; 7:00 p.m. Game 3	HR: None	Box Score	HR: Advincula (5)	Scottsdale Stadium, Scottsdale, AZ; Attendance: 1,738; Umpires: HP: Angel Campos; 1B: Kellen Levy; 2B: Scott Letendre; 3B: Billy Van Raaphorst

May 22; 7:00 p.m. Game 6	(1) Arizona	6–5	(9) Washington	Scottsdale Stadium, Scottsdale, AZ; Attendance: 2,246; Umpires: HP: Pat Riley; 1B: Ramon Armendariz; 2B: Darren Hyman; 3B: Mike Fichter
May 22; 7:00 p.m. Game 6	WP: T. Pluta 2–1; Sv: A. Susac (3)	Box Score	LP: J. Engman (0–8)	Scottsdale Stadium, Scottsdale, AZ; Attendance: 2,246; Umpires: HP: Pat Riley; 1B: Ramon Armendariz; 2B: Darren Hyman; 3B: Mike Fichter
May 22; 7:00 p.m. Game 6	HR: Caufield (18), White (5)	Box Score	HR: Guerrero (15)	Scottsdale Stadium, Scottsdale, AZ; Attendance: 2,246; Umpires: HP: Pat Riley; 1B: Ramon Armendariz; 2B: Darren Hyman; 3B: Mike Fichter

May 23; 7:00 p.m. Game 9	(6) California	7–5	(1) Arizona	Scottsdale Stadium, Scottsdale, AZ; Attendance: 2,544; Umpires: HP: Mike Lusky; 1B: Joe Burleson; 2B: Nate White; 3B: Steve Mattingly
May 23; 7:00 p.m. Game 9	WP: L. Short (6–2); Sv: C. Beccerra (4)	Box Score	LP: J. Kent (3–4)	Scottsdale Stadium, Scottsdale, AZ; Attendance: 2,544; Umpires: HP: Mike Lusky; 1B: Joe Burleson; 2B: Nate White; 3B: Steve Mattingly
May 23; 7:00 p.m. Game 9	HR: White (19), Mihalakis (3)	Box Score	HR: Schulze (10)	Scottsdale Stadium, Scottsdale, AZ; Attendance: 2,544; Umpires: HP: Mike Lusky; 1B: Joe Burleson; 2B: Nate White; 3B: Steve Mattingly

=== Pool B ===
	Pool B	OSU	ASU	STAN
2	Oregon State		3−2	1−2
5	Arizona State	2−3		7−8
8	Stanford	2−1	8−7	

Pos	Team	Pld	W	L	RF	RA	RD	PCT	Qualification
1	(8) Stanford	2	2	0	10	8	+2	1.000	Advanced to Semifinals
2	(2) Oregon State	2	1	1	4	4	0	.500	Eliminated
3	(5) Arizona State	2	0	2	9	11	−2	.000	Eliminated

May 21; 10:00 a.m. Game 1	(8) Stanford	8–7	(5) Arizona State	Scottsdale Stadium, Scottsdale, AZ; Attendance: 1,738; Umpires: HP: Mike Fichter; 1B: Pat Riley; 2B: Ramon Armendariz; 3B: Darren Hyman
May 21; 10:00 a.m. Game 1	WP: T. O'Harran (2−4); Sv: N. Dugan (3)	Box Score	LP: C. Markl (6−4)	Scottsdale Stadium, Scottsdale, AZ; Attendance: 1,738; Umpires: HP: Mike Fichter; 1B: Pat Riley; 2B: Ramon Armendariz; 3B: Darren Hyman
May 21; 10:00 a.m. Game 1	HR: Moore (17)	Box Score	HR: Lance (8)	Scottsdale Stadium, Scottsdale, AZ; Attendance: 1,738; Umpires: HP: Mike Fichter; 1B: Pat Riley; 2B: Ramon Armendariz; 3B: Darren Hyman

May 22; 10:00 a.m. Game 4	(2) Oregon State	1–2	(8) Stanford	Scottsdale Stadium, Scottsdale, AZ; Attendance: 2,246; Umpires: HP: Steve Mattingly; 1B: Mike Lusky; 2B: Joe Burleson; 3B: Nate White
May 22; 10:00 a.m. Game 4	LP: J. Hunter (1−1)	Box Score	WP: J. Volchko (2−1); Sv: T. O'Harran (7)	Scottsdale Stadium, Scottsdale, AZ; Attendance: 2,246; Umpires: HP: Steve Mattingly; 1B: Mike Lusky; 2B: Joe Burleson; 3B: Nate White
May 22; 10:00 a.m. Game 4	HR: None	Box Score	HR: Moore (18)	Scottsdale Stadium, Scottsdale, AZ; Attendance: 2,246; Umpires: HP: Steve Mattingly; 1B: Mike Lusky; 2B: Joe Burleson; 3B: Nate White

May 23; 10:00 a.m. Game 7	(5) Arizona State	2–3	(2) Oregon State	Scottsdale Stadium, Scottsdale, AZ; Attendance: 2,544; Umpires: HP: Scott Letendre; 1B: Bill Van Raaphorst; 2B: Angel Campos; 3B: Kellen Levy
May 23; 10:00 a.m. Game 7	WP: B. Jacobs (4−0); Sv: B. Holmes (12)	Box Score	WP: N. Keljo (3−0)	Scottsdale Stadium, Scottsdale, AZ; Attendance: 2,544; Umpires: HP: Scott Letendre; 1B: Bill Van Raaphorst; 2B: Angel Campos; 3B: Kellen Levy
May 23; 10:00 a.m. Game 7	HR: None	Box Score	HR: None	Scottsdale Stadium, Scottsdale, AZ; Attendance: 2,544; Umpires: HP: Scott Letendre; 1B: Bill Van Raaphorst; 2B: Angel Campos; 3B: Kellen Levy

=== Pool C ===
	Pool C	ORE	USC	UTAH
3	Oregon		2−4	2−4
4	USC	4−2		7−6
7	Utah	4−2	6−7	

Pos	Team	Pld	W	L	RF	RA	RD	PCT	Qualification
1	(4) USC	2	2	0	11	8	+3	1.000	Advanced to Semifinals
2	(7) Utah	2	1	1	10	9	+1	.500	Eliminated
3	(3) Oregon	2	0	2	4	8	−4	.000	Eliminated

May 21; 2:30 p.m. Game 2	(7) Utah	6–7	(4) USC	Scottsdale Stadium, Scottsdale, AZ; Attendance: 1,738; Umpires: HP: Nate White; 1B: Steve Mattingly; 2B: Mike Lusky; 3B: Joe Burleson
May 21; 2:30 p.m. Game 2	LP: M. Ashman (1−4)	Box Score	WP: X. Martinez (4−0); Sv: J. Blum (8)	Scottsdale Stadium, Scottsdale, AZ; Attendance: 1,738; Umpires: HP: Nate White; 1B: Steve Mattingly; 2B: Mike Lusky; 3B: Joe Burleson
May 21; 2:30 p.m. Game 2	HR: K. Carpenter (7)	Box Score	HR: C. Wells (4)	Scottsdale Stadium, Scottsdale, AZ; Attendance: 1,738; Umpires: HP: Nate White; 1B: Steve Mattingly; 2B: Mike Lusky; 3B: Joe Burleson

May 22; 2:30 p.m. Game 5	(3) Oregon	2–4	(7) Utah	Scottsdale Stadium, Scottsdale, AZ; Attendance: 2,246; Umpires: HP: Kellen Levy; 1B: Scott Letendre; 2B: Billy Van Raaphorst; 3B: Angel Campos
May 22; 2:30 p.m. Game 5	LP: B. Mullan (4−1)	Box Score	WP: B. Van Sickle (5−1); Sv: M. Jones (1)	Scottsdale Stadium, Scottsdale, AZ; Attendance: 2,246; Umpires: HP: Kellen Levy; 1B: Scott Letendre; 2B: Billy Van Raaphorst; 3B: Angel Campos
May 22; 2:30 p.m. Game 5	HR: None	Box Score	HR: None	Scottsdale Stadium, Scottsdale, AZ; Attendance: 2,246; Umpires: HP: Kellen Levy; 1B: Scott Letendre; 2B: Billy Van Raaphorst; 3B: Angel Campos

May 23; 2:30 p.m. Game 8	(4) USC	4–2	(3) Oregon	Scottsdale Stadium, Scottsdale, AZ; Attendance: 2,544; Umpires: HP: Ramon Armendariz; 1B: Darren Hyman; 2B: Mike Fichter; 3B: Pat Riley
May 23; 2:30 p.m. Game 8	WP: W. Watson (5−2); Sv: J. Blum (9)	Box Score	LP: RJ Gordon (7−5)	Scottsdale Stadium, Scottsdale, AZ; Attendance: 2,544; Umpires: HP: Ramon Armendariz; 1B: Darren Hyman; 2B: Mike Fichter; 3B: Pat Riley
May 23; 2:30 p.m. Game 8	HR: Jackson (4)	Box Score	HR: None	Scottsdale Stadium, Scottsdale, AZ; Attendance: 2,544; Umpires: HP: Ramon Armendariz; 1B: Darren Hyman; 2B: Mike Fichter; 3B: Pat Riley

== Finals ==
Semifinals May 24
4	USC	7
6	California	4
1	Arizona	6
8	Stanford	3

Final May 25
4	USC	3
1	Arizona	4

May 24; 2:30 p.m. Game 10	No. 6 California	4–7	No. 4 USC	Scottsdale Stadium, Scottsdale, AZ; Umpires: HP: Bill Van Raaphorst; 1B: Mike Fichter; 2B: Steve Mattingly; 3B: Scott Letendre
May 24; 2:30 p.m. Game 10	LP: T. Newman (4−6)	Box Score	WP: M. Edwards (1−3); Sv: J. Blum (10)	Scottsdale Stadium, Scottsdale, AZ; Umpires: HP: Bill Van Raaphorst; 1B: Mike Fichter; 2B: Steve Mattingly; 3B: Scott Letendre
May 24; 2:30 p.m. Game 10	HR: Lomavita (15)	Box Score	HR: Dowd (1)	Scottsdale Stadium, Scottsdale, AZ; Umpires: HP: Bill Van Raaphorst; 1B: Mike Fichter; 2B: Steve Mattingly; 3B: Scott Letendre

May 24; 7:00 p.m. Game 11	No. 8 Stanford	3–6	No. 1 Arizona	Scottsdale Stadium, Scottsdale, AZ; Umpires: HP: Joe Burleson; 1B: Angel Campos; 2B: Ramon Armendariz; 3B: Mike Lusky
May 24; 7:00 p.m. Game 11	LP: M. Scott (4−10)	Box Score	WP: C. Candiotti (7−3); Sv: C. Hintz (3)	Scottsdale Stadium, Scottsdale, AZ; Umpires: HP: Joe Burleson; 1B: Angel Campos; 2B: Ramon Armendariz; 3B: Mike Lusky
May 24; 7:00 p.m. Game 11	HR: None	Box Score	HR: Summerhill (8)	Scottsdale Stadium, Scottsdale, AZ; Umpires: HP: Joe Burleson; 1B: Angel Campos; 2B: Ramon Armendariz; 3B: Mike Lusky

May 25; 7:00 p.m. Game 12	No. 4 USC	3–4	No. 1 Arizona	Scottsdale Stadium, Scottsdale, AZ; Attendance: 3,813; Umpires: HP: Darren Hyman; 1B: Kellen Levy; 2B: Joe Burleson; 3B: Bill Van Raaphorst
May 25; 7:00 p.m. Game 12	LP: J. Blum (2−1)	Box Score	WP: A. Susac (2−2)	Scottsdale Stadium, Scottsdale, AZ; Attendance: 3,813; Umpires: HP: Darren Hyman; 1B: Kellen Levy; 2B: Joe Burleson; 3B: Bill Van Raaphorst
May 25; 7:00 p.m. Game 12	HR: None	Box Score	HR: None	Scottsdale Stadium, Scottsdale, AZ; Attendance: 3,813; Umpires: HP: Darren Hyman; 1B: Kellen Levy; 2B: Joe Burleson; 3B: Bill Van Raaphorst

== Schedule ==
2024 Bracket, home teams listed last.

Game	Time*	Matchup^{#}	Score	Television	Attendance
Pool Play – Tuesday, May 21
1	10:00 a.m.	**No. 8 Stanford** vs No. 5 Arizona State (Pool B)	8–7	Pac-12 Network	1,738
2	2:30 p.m.	No. 7 Utah vs **No. 4 USC** (Pool C)	6–7	Pac-12 Network	1,738
3	7:00 p.m.	No. 9 Washington vs **No. 6 California** (Pool A)	0–12^{(7 inn.)}	Pac-12 Network	1,738
Pool Play – Wednesday, May 22
4	10:00 a.m.	No. 2 Oregon State vs **No. 8 Stanford** (Pool B)	1–2	Pac-12 Network	2,246
5	2:30 p.m.	No. 3 Oregon vs **No. 7 Utah** (Pool C)	2–4	Pac-12 Network	2,246
6	7:00 p.m.	**No. 1 Arizona** vs No. 9 Washington (Pool A)	6–5	Pac-12 Network	2,246
Pool Play – Thursday, May 23
7	10:00 a.m.	No. 5 Arizona State vs **No. 2 Oregon State** (Pool B)	2–3	Pac-12 Network	2,544
8	2:30 p.m.	**No. 4 USC** vs No. 3 Oregon (Pool C)	4–2	Pac-12 Network	2,544
9	7:00 p.m.	**No. 6 California** vs No. 1 Arizona (Pool A)	7–5	Pac-12 Network	2,544
Semifinals – Friday, May 24
10	2:30 p.m.	No. 6 California vs **No. 4 USC**	4–7	Pac-12 Network	2,097
11	7:00 p.m.	No. 8 Stanford vs **No. 1 Arizona**	3–6	Pac-12 Network	2,097
Championship – Saturday, May 25
12	7:00 p.m.	No. 4 USC vs **No. 1 Arizona**	3–4	ESPN2	3,813
*Game times in MST. # – Rankings denote tournament seed.

=== All-tournament Team ===
The following players were members of the 2024 Pac-12 Baseball All-Tournament Team. Player in Bold selected as Tournament MVP.

Position	Player	School
C	Malcolm Moore	Stanford
1B	Peyton Schulze	California
2B	Ryan Jackson	USC
3B	Max Handron	California
SS	**Mason White** (MVP)	**Arizona**
DH	Kevin Takeuchi	USC
OF	Brayden Dowd	USC
OF	Brendan Summerhill	Arizona
OF	Rodney Greene Jr.	California
P	Caden Aoki	USC
P	Clark Candiotti	Arizona
