= Chip Hale =

American baseball player & coach (born 1964)

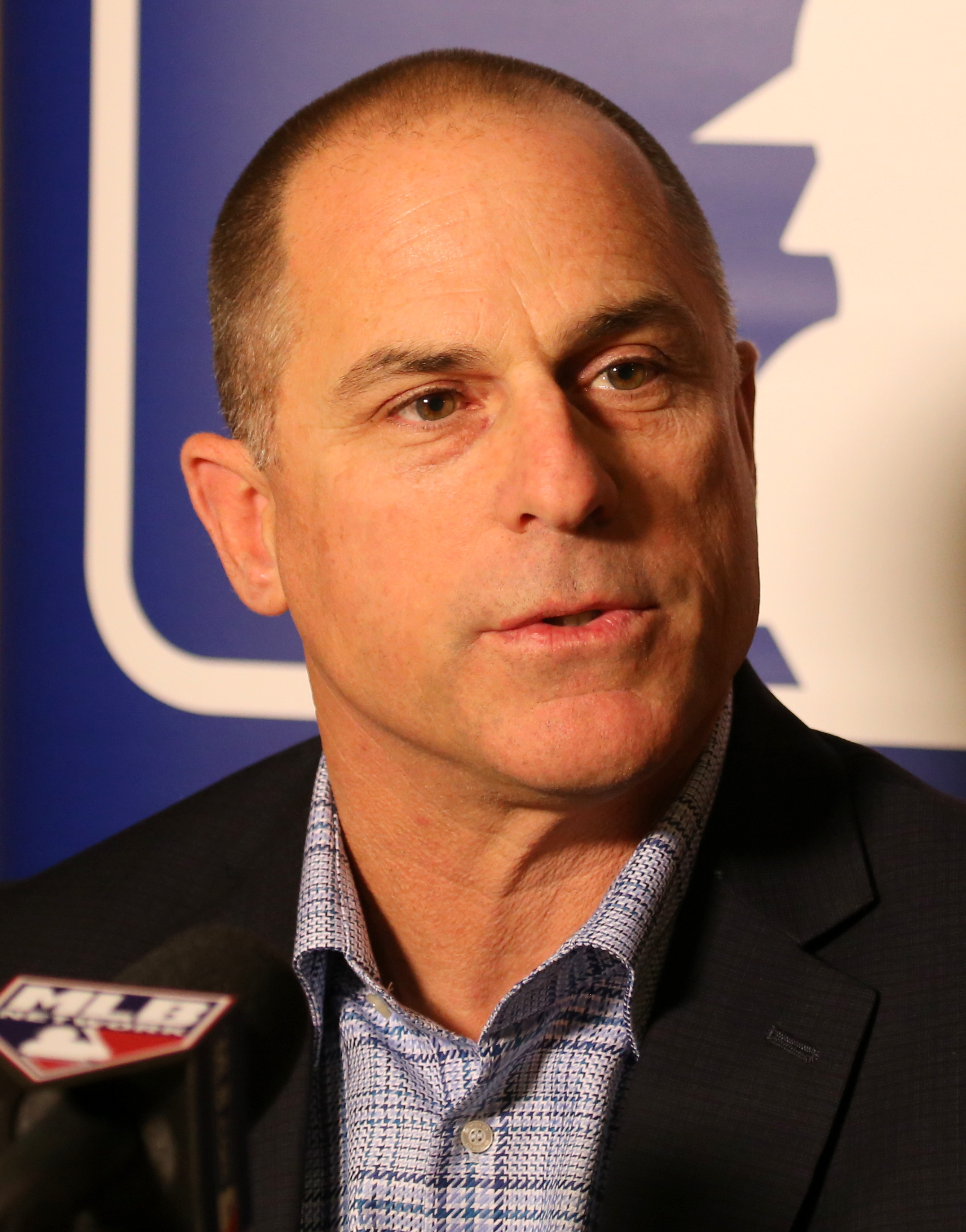
- Hale in 2015
- Born: Walter William Hale; December 2, 1964 (age 61); San Jose, California, U.S.
- Baseball career
- Infielder / Manager / Coach
- Batted: Left Threw: Right

MLB debut
- August 27, 1989, for the Minnesota Twins

Last MLB appearance
- May 4, 1997, for the Los Angeles Dodgers

MLB statistics
- Batting average: .277
- Home runs: 7
- Runs batted in: 78
- Managerial record: 148–176
- Winning %: .457
- Stats at Baseball Reference
- Managerial record at Baseball Reference

Teams
- As player: Minnesota Twins (1989–1990, 1993–1996); Los Angeles Dodgers (1997); As manager: Arizona Diamondbacks (2015–2016); As coach: Arizona Diamondbacks (2007–2009); New York Mets (2010–2011); Oakland Athletics (2012–2014, 2017); Washington Nationals (2018–2020); Detroit Tigers (2021)

Career highlights and awards
- World Series champion (2019)
- Coaching career

Current position
- Title: Head Coach
- Team: Arizona
- Conference: Big 12
- Record: 152–95

Biographical details
- Education: Arizona

Coaching career (HC unless noted)
- 2022–present: Arizona

Head coaching record
- Overall: 152–95 (.570)
- Tournaments: NCAA: 7–9

Accomplishments and honors

Championships
- Pac-12 regular season (2024); Pac-12 Tournament (2024); Big 12 Tournament (2025)

Awards
- Pac-12 Coach of the Year (2024)

Walter William "Chip" Hale (born December 2, 1964) is an American professional baseball infielder, coach, and manager. Hale played in Major League Baseball (MLB) from 1989 through 1997, and managed in MLB from 2015 through 2016. He was named head coach of the Arizona Wildcats of the University of Arizona in July 2021.

Hale played in MLB for the Minnesota Twins and Los Angeles Dodgers, mostly as a second baseman and third baseman. He became a coach for the Arizona Diamondbacks in 2007, then later on was named team manager for 2015-2016 and also served as a coach for the New York Mets, Oakland Athletics, Washington Nationals, and Detroit Tigers.

== Playing career ==
Born in San Jose, California, Hale started playing baseball with Cupertino National Little League in Cupertino, California, and played for Campolindo High School in Moraga, California. He attended the University of Arizona, where he played college baseball for the Arizona Wildcats. He was a part of the 1986 College World Series champions. He also set school records in hits and walks for a career. In 1984 and 1985, he played collegiate summer baseball for the Orleans Cardinals of the Cape Cod Baseball League and was named a league all-star in 1985.

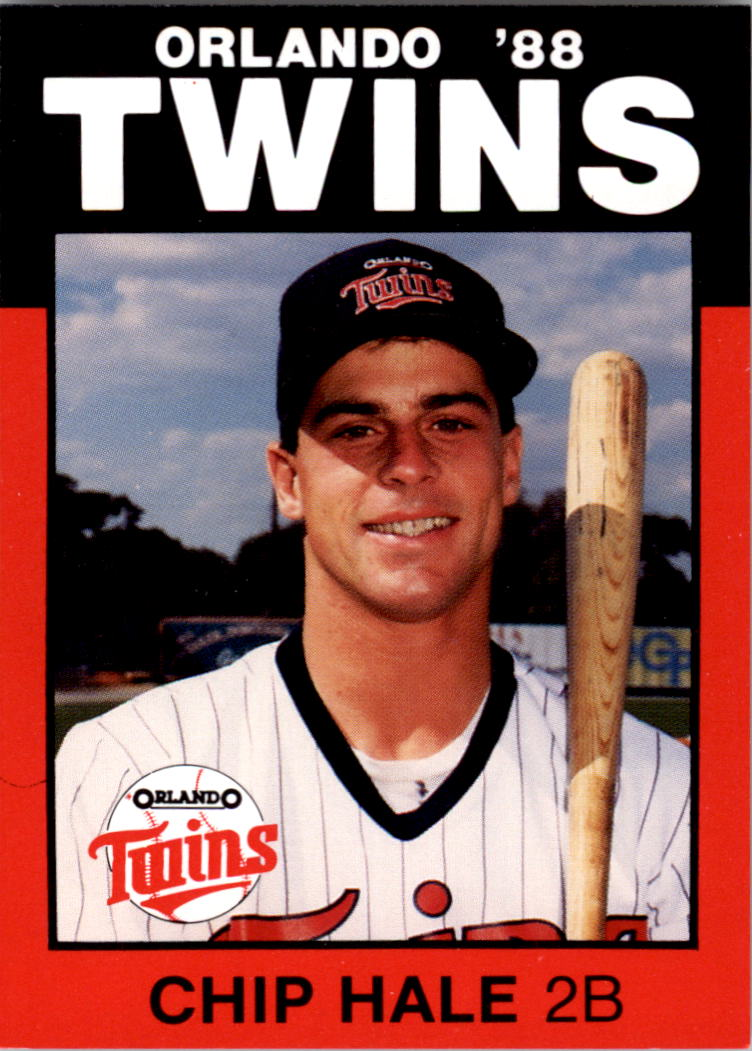
A 1988 baseball card of Hale as a player with the Orlando Twins

The Minnesota Twins selected Hale in the 17th round, with the 425th overall selection, of the 1987 Major League Baseball draft. Hale made his major league debut with the Twins in 1989, and played in parts of six seasons with the team. He signed with the Los Angeles Dodgers as a free agent prior to the 1997 season, then appeared in only 14 games for the team, in what would be his final major league season.

Hale is associated with one of the most famous bloopers in baseball history. On May 27, 1991, while playing for the Class AAA Portland Beavers, Hale hit a deep fly ball to right field where Vancouver Canadians outfielder Rodney McCray ran through the outfield wall attempting to catch the ball.

== Coaching career ==
Hale joined the Arizona Diamondbacks organization as the manager of the Missoula Osprey for the 2000 season. He managed the El Paso Diablos in 2002 and the Tucson Sidewinders from 2004 to 2006. Under Hale's leadership the minor league Sidewinders finished the regular season with a record of 91–53, a new franchise record; and Hale was named Pacific Coast League Manager of the Year.

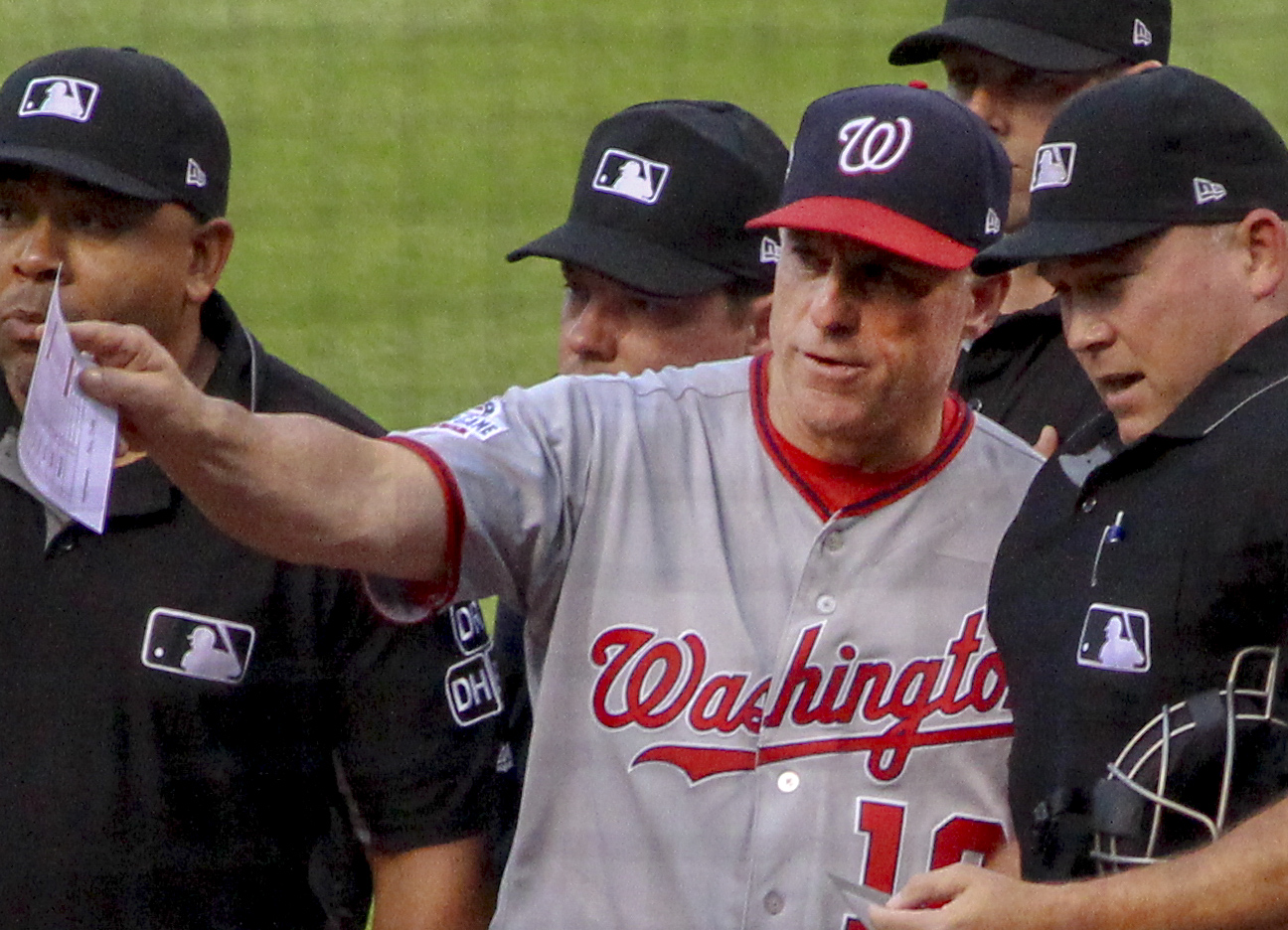
Hale with the Nationals

For the 2007 Major League Baseball season, Hale served as a coach for the Arizona Diamondbacks under manager Bob Melvin.

In 2009, Hale was hired as the third base coach for the New York Mets. He was a candidate to become manager of the Mets after Jerry Manuel was fired at the end of the 2010 season; however, the position went to Terry Collins.

On October 5, 2011, Hale signed a two-year deal to become bench coach of the Oakland Athletics. On the same day, the Mets announced that Hale would not be returning to the league club for the 2012 season and would be replaced by Tim Teufel.

On May 29, 2013, Hale was ejected for the first time in his MLB playing or coaching career for arguing a spectator interference and runner placement call. Brian Knight was the ejecting umpire.

Hale then went back to the Arizona Diamondbacks during the 2015 and 2016 seasons as the club's manager, compiling a 148–176 record. He was fired from the managerial position on October 3, 2016.

Hale was re-hired by the Oakland Athletics on October 18, 2016, this time as the team's third-base coach.

Then, in November 2017, the Washington Nationals hired Hale as their bench coach. On October 29, 2019, in Game 6 of the World Series, he became the acting manager for the Nationals after Dave Martinez was ejected in the 7th inning. Hale and the Nationals maintained their lead, garnering a 7-2 win to force a Game 7, thus paving the way to winning the franchise’s first World Championship, the following night.

On November 7, 2020, Hale was named the third base coach for the Detroit Tigers.

On July 5, 2021, Hale left the Tigers so he could become the head baseball coach at the University of Arizona.

=== Managerial record ===
As of games played 2019.

Team	Year	Regular season					Postseason			
Team	Year	Games	Won	Lost	Win %	Finish	Won	Lost	Win %	Result
ARZ	2015	162	79	83	.488	3rd in NL West	–	–	–	–
ARZ	2016	162	69	93	.426	4th in NL West	–	–	–	–
Total		324	148	176	.457		0	0	.000	

=== Head coaching record ===
Record table
Season	Team	Overall	Conference	Standing	Postseason
Arizona Wildcats (Pac-12 Conference) (2022–2024)
2022	Arizona	39–25	16–14	5th	NCAA Regional
2023	Arizona	33–26	12–18	8th	NCAA Regional
2024	Arizona	36–23	20–10	1st	NCAA Regional
Arizona:		– (–)	48–42 (.533)		
Arizona Wildcats (Big 12 Conference) (2025–present)
2025	Arizona	44–21	18–12	4th	College World Series
2026	Arizona	19–34	9–21	13th	
Arizona:		171–129 (.570)	27–33 (.450)		
Total:		171–129 (.570)			
National champion Postseason invitational champion Conference regular season champion Conference regular season and conference tournament champion Division regular season champion Division regular season and conference tournament champion Conference tournament champion

Sporting positions
Preceded by Joe Almaraz	Missoula Osprey manager 2000–2001	Succeeded by Jack Howell
Preceded by Al Pedrique	El Paso Diablos manager 2002	Succeeded by Scott Coolbaugh
Preceded by Al Pedrique	Tucson Sidewinders manager 2004–2006	Succeeded by Bill Plummer
Preceded by Carlos Tosca	Arizona Diamondbacks third base coach 2007–2009	Succeeded by Joel Youngblood
Preceded by Razor Shines	New York Mets third base coach 2010–2011	Succeeded by Tim Teufel
Preceded by Joel Skinner	Oakland Athletics bench coach 2012–2014	Succeeded by Mike Aldrete
Preceded by Ron Washington	Oakland Athletics third base coach 2017	Succeeded by Matt Williams
Preceded by Chris Speier	Washington Nationals bench coach 2018–2019	Succeeded by Tim Bogar
Preceded by Bob Henley	Washington Nationals third base coach 2020	Succeeded by Bob Henley
Preceded by Ramón Santiago	Detroit Tigers third base coach 2021	Succeeded by Kimera Bartee
