= 2024 Arizona State Sun Devils baseball team =

American baseball team

2024 Arizona State Sun Devils baseball
- Conference: Pac-12 Conference
- Record: 32-26 (17-13 Pac-12)
- Head coach: Willie Bloomquist (3rd season)
- Assistant coaches: Mike Goff (3rd season); Anthony Gilich (1st season)
- Pitching coach: Sam Peraza (3rd season)
- Home stadium: Phoenix Municipal Stadium

2024 Pac-12 Conference baseball standings
	Conf.						Overall
Team	W		L		T	PCT	W		L		T	PCT
No. 25 Arizona ‍†‍‡‍^{y}	20	–	10	–	0	.667	36	–	23	–	0	.610
No. 10 Oregon State ‍‍‍^{y}	19	–	10	–	0	.655	42	–	14	–	0	.750
No. 12 Oregon ‍‍‍^{y}	19	–	11	–	0	.633	37	–	18	–	0	.673
USC ‍‍‍	17	–	12	–	0	.586	31	–	28	–	0	.525
California ‍‍‍	17	–	13	–	0	.567	36	–	19	–	0	.655
Arizona State ‍‍‍	17	–	13	–	0	.567	32	–	26	–	0	.552
Utah ‍‍‍	16	–	14	–	0	.533	33	–	22	–	0	.600
Stanford ‍‍‍	11	–	19	–	0	.367	22	–	32	–	0	.407
Washington ‍‍‍	10	–	20	–	0	.333	19	–	31	–	1	.382
Washington State ‍‍‍	9	–	21	–	0	.300	21	–	32	–	0	.396
UCLA ‍‍‍	9	–	21	–	0	.300	19	–	33	–	0	.365
† – Conference champion ‡ – Tournament champion y – Invited to the NCAA Tournament; As of May 25, 2024; Rankings from D1Baseball

The 2024 Arizona State Sun Devils baseball team represented Arizona State University in the 2024 NCAA Division I baseball season. The Sun Devils played their home games at Phoenix Municipal Stadium under third year coach Willie Bloomquist.

== Previous season ==
The Sun Devils finished their season with a record of 32–23, and 16–13 in conference play finishing 5th in the 2023 Pac-12 Conference baseball standings.

=== 2023 MLB draft ===
The Sun Devils had eight players drafted in the 2023 MLB draft.

Player	Position	Round	Overall	MLB team
Luke Keaschall	2nd Base	2	49	Minnesota Twins
Ross Dunn	Pitcher	10	297	Minnesota Twins
Khristian Curtis	Pitcher	12	347	Pittsburgh Pirates
Timmy Manning	Pitcher	12	360	San Francisco Giants
Josh Hansell	Pitcher	16	469	Kansas City Royals
Blake Pivaroff	Pitcher	19	560	Detroit Tigers
Wyatt Crenshaw	2nd Base	19	565	Arizona Diamondbacks
Owen Stevenson	Pitcher	19	573	Tampa Bay Rays

== Incoming Recruits ==
2024 Arizona State Recruits
Name	B/T	Pos.	Height	Weight	Hometown	High School
Jaden Alba	R/R	RHP	6’3”	195 lbs	Cerritos, CA	Gahr High School
Jax Ryan	R/R	SS	6’1”	185 lbs	Claremore, OK	Verdigris High School
Cole Carlon	L/L	LHP	6’5”	210 lbs	Tempe, AZ	Corona del Sol High School
Bradyn Barnes	L/L	LHP	6’1”	200 lbs	Chandler, AZ	Basha High School
Adam Behrens	L/R	RHP	6’3”	195 lbs	Lake Villa, IL	Warren Township High School
Alec Belardes	R/R	RHP	6’2”	195 lbs	San Jose, CA	Valley Christian Schools
Brody Briggs	L/R	C	6’1”	180 lbs	Broken Arrow, OK	Union High School
Thomas Burns	R/R	RHP	6’4”	205 lbs	Hortonville, WI	Hortonville High School
Josh Butler	R/R	RHP	6’6”	205 lbs	Peoria, AZ	Sandra Day O'Connor High School
Brok Eddy	R/R	RHP	6’3”	180 lbs	Brighton, CO	Brighton High School
Bennett Fryman	L/L	LHP	5’11”	195 lbs	Frisco, TX	Lone Star High School
Wyatt Halvorson	R/R	RHP	6’3”	215 lbs	Scottsdale, AZ	Chaparral High School
Ryan Kroepel	L/R	SS	5’11”	170 lbs	Poway, CA	Poway High School
Rohan Lettow	R/R	RHP	6’2”	180 lbs	Chandler, AZ	Hamilton High School
Ethan Mendoza	R/R	SS	5’11”	170 lbs	Bedford, TX	Carroll Senior High School

== Personnel ==
=== Roster ===
2024 Arizona State Sun Devils roster
Pitchers: 13 – Tyler Meyer – (redshirt) Sophomore; 15 – Thomas Burns – Freshman; 22 – Ben Jacobs – Sophomore; 25 – Bradyn Barnes – Freshman; 27 – Brandon Compton – (redshirt) Freshman; 29 – Alec Belardes – Freshman; 31 – Hunter Omlid – Senior; 35 – Josh Butler – Freshman; 36 – Wyatt Halvorson – Freshman; 38 – Sean Fitzpatrick – Sophomore; 40 – Jonah Giblin – (redshirt) Junior; 41 – Matt Cornelius – Junior; 44 – Matt Tieding – (redshirt) Senior; 45 – Brok Eddy – Freshman; 47 – Rohan Lettow – Freshman; 49 – Jaden Alba – Freshman; 51 – Adam Behrens – Freshman; 52 – Connor Markl – Senior; 54 – Ryan Schiefer – Junior	Catchers: 5 – Trey Newman – (redshirt) Senior; 17 – Ryan Campos – Junior; 21 – Josiah Cromwick – Senior; 50 – Brody Briggs – Freshman; Infielders: 2 – Ethan Mendoza – Freshman; 4 – Jax Ryan – Freshman; 6 – Nu'u Contrades – Sophomore; 7 – Eamonn Lance – Graduate; 8 – Steven Ondina – Senior; 9 – Kevin Karstetter – Senior; 18 – Jacob Tobias – Junior; 32 – Mario Demera – Senior; 43 – Ryan Kroepel – Freshman	Outfielders: 3 – Nick McLain – (redshirt) Sophomore; 11 – Kien Vu – Sophomore; 12 – Harris Williams – (redshirt) Senior; 24 – Isaiah Jackson – Sophomore; Utility: 10 – Bennett Fryman (P/OF) – Freshman; 14 – Cole Carlon (P/INF) – Freshman

=== Coaching staff ===
2024 Arizona State coaching staff
Name	Position	Seasons at Arizona State	Alma mater
Willie Bloomquist	Head coach	3	Arizona State
Mike Goff	Assistant Coach	3	UAB
Anthony Gilich	Assistant Coach	1	Central Washington
Sam Peraza	Pitching Coach/Recruiting Coordinator	3	San Diego State

== Preseason ==
=== Pac–12 media poll ===
Pac–12 media poll
Predicted finish	Team	Votes (1st place)
1	Oregon State	95 (8)
2	Stanford	85 (2)
3	UCLA	82 (1)
4	Oregon	74
5	USC	64
6	Arizona State	50
7	Washington	49
8	California	40
9	Arizona	31
10	Utah	20
11	Washington State	15

=== Preseason Honors ===
==== All-Pac-12 Team ====
Preseason All-Pac-12 Baseball Team
Player	Position	Class
Ryan Campos	Catcher	Junior
Nu'U Contrades	Infielder	Sophomore
Jacob Tobias	Infielder	Junior
Nick McLain	Outfielder	(redshirt) Sophomore
Harris Williams	Outfielder	(redshirt) Senior

== Schedule and results ==
Legend
	Arizona State win
	Arizona State loss
	Postponement
	Rankings from D1Baseball
**Bold**	Arizona State team member

2024 Arizona State Sun Devils baseball game log
Regular Season
Date	Opponent	Rank	Site/stadium	Score	Win	Loss	Save	Overall Record	Pac-12 Record
Feb 16	Santa Clara		Phoenix Municipal Stadium • Phoenix, AZ	**W** 11–6	**Burns (1–0)**	Pilchard (0–1)	–	1–0	–
Feb 17	Santa Clara		Phoenix Municipal Stadium • Phoenix, AZ	**W** 14–13	**Behrens (1–0)**	Hammond (0–1)	**Carlon (1)**	2–0	–
Feb 18	Santa Clara		Phoenix Municipal Stadium • Phoenix, AZ	**L** 13–14	Bayles (1–0)	**Omlid (0–1)**	Schreiber (1)	2–1	–
Feb 20	No. 24 Kansas State		Phoenix Municipal Stadium • Phoenix, AZ	**W** 9–6	**Cornelius (1–0)**	Dean (0–1)	**Tieding (1)**	3–1	–
Feb 22	Ohio State		Phoenix Municipal Stadium • Phoenix, AZ	**L** 4–11	Beidelschies (1–1)	**Jacobs (0–1)**	–	3–2	–
Feb 23	Ohio State		Phoenix Municipal Stadium • Phoenix, AZ	**W** 14–4	**Cornelius (2–0)**	Purcell (1–1)	–	4–2	–
Feb 24	Ohio State		Phoenix Municipal Stadium • Phoenix, AZ	**L** 4–13	Brown (1–0)	**Omlid (0–1)**	–	4–3	–
Feb 25	Ohio State		Phoenix Municipal Stadium • Phoenix, AZ	**W** 10–8^{8}	**Behrens (2–0)**	Shaw (0–1)	**Carlon (2)**	5–3	–
Mar 1	vs No. 7 Texas A&M		Globe Life Field • Arlington, TX	**L** 0–4	Prager (3–0)	**Burns (1–1)**	Aschenbeck (1)	5–4	–
Mar 2	vs No. 5 TCU		Globe Life Field • Arlington, TX	**L** 9–11	Cawyer (4–0)	**Behrens (2–1)**	–	5–5	–
Mar 3	vs No. 7 Texas A&M		Globe Life Field • Arlington, TX	**L** 5–10	Badmaev (1–0)	**Meyer (0–1)**	–	5–6	–
Mar 5	at UT Arlington		Clay Gould Ballpark • Arlington, TX	**W** 6–3	**Omlid (1–2)**	Hasty (0–1)	–	6–6	–
Mar 8	Oregon		Phoenix Municipal Stadium • Phoenix, AZ	**W** 5–4	**Carlon (1–0)**	Grinsell (1–2)	–	7–6	1–0
Mar 9	Oregon		Phoenix Municipal Stadium • Phoenix, AZ	**L** 4–6	Mullan (3–0)	**Carlon (1–1)**	–	7–7	1–1
Mar 10	Oregon		Phoenix Municipal Stadium • Phoenix, AZ	**L** 5–8	Freund (2–0)	**Meyer (0–2)**	Mercado (2)	7–8	1–2
Mar 12	New Mexico		Phoenix Municipal Stadium • Phoenix, AZ	**L** 4–6	Pengelly (2–1)	**Fitzpatrick (0–1)**	McBroom (3)	7–9	1–2
Mar 15	at Arizona		Hi Corbett Field • Tucson, AZ	**W** 3–2	**Jacobs (1–1)**	Orloff (1–2)	–	8–9	2–2
Mar 16	at Arizona		Hi Corbett Field • Tucson, AZ	**W** 4–0	**Markl (1–0)**	Candiotti (1–1)	**Schiefer (1)**	9–9	3–2
Mar 17	at Arizona		Hi Corbett Field • Tucson, AZ	**L** 3–14	Long (1–1)	**Behrens (2–2)**	–	9–10	3–3
Mar 19	Utah Valley		Phoenix Municipal Stadium • Phoenix, AZ	**W** 5–4	**Omlid (2–2)**	Rodabaugh (0–1)	–	10–10	3–3
Mar 20	Utah Valley		Phoenix Municipal Stadium • Phoenix, AZ	**L** 5–7	Boisvert (2–1)	**Halvorson (0–1)**	Sims (2)	10–11	3–3
Mar 22	at Washington State		Bailey–Brayton Field • Pullman, WA	**L** 7–8	Brotherton (4–1)	**Schiefer (0–1)**	Grillo (2)	10–12	3–4
Mar 23	at Washington State		Bailey–Brayton Field • Pullman, WA	**L** 2–3	Wilford (3–1)	**Markl (1–1)**	Grillo (3)	10–13	3–5
Mar 24	at Washington State		Bailey–Brayton Field • Pullman, WA	**L** 6–8	Jones (2–2)	**Halvorson (0–2)**	Grillo (4)	10–14	3–6
Mar 25	vs UNLV		Las Vegas Ballpark • Las Vegas, NV	**W** 10–9	**Jacobs (2–1)**	Maloney (2–1)	–	11–14	3–6
Mar 28	California		Phoenix Municipal Stadium • Phoenix, AZ	**W** 14–8	**Tieding (1–0)**	Short (2–1)	–	12–14	4–6
Mar 29	California		Phoenix Municipal Stadium • Phoenix, AZ	**W** 10–9	**Carlon (2–1)**	Newmann (0–3)	–	13–14	5–6
Mar 30	California		Phoenix Municipal Stadium • Phoenix, AZ	**W** 9–6	**Markl (2–1)**	Mayer (0–3)	**Schiefer (2)**	14–14	6–6
Apr 2	Grand Canyon		Phoenix Municipal Stadium • Phoenix, AZ	**W** 9–8	**Jacobs (3–1)**	Ward (1–1)	–	15–14	6–6
Apr 5	at No. 5 Oregon State		Goss Stadium at Coleman Field • Corvallis, OR	**L** 8–13	Keljo (1–0)	**Barnes (0–1)**	Holmes (5)	15–15	6–7
Apr 6	at No. 5 Oregon State		Goss Stadium at Coleman Field • Corvallis, OR	**L** 1–9	Kmatz (4–1)	**Markl (2–2)**	–	15–16	6–8
Apr 7	at No. 5 Oregon State		Goss Stadium at Coleman Field • Corvallis, OR	**L** 7–9	Hutcheson (2–2)	**Schiefer (0–2)**	Holmes (6)	15–17	6–9
Apr 9	at Grand Canyon		Brazell Field at GCU Ballpark • Phoenix, AZ	**L** 3–5	Ahern (1–0)	**Fitzpatrick (0–2)**	Ward (6)	15–18	–
Apr 12	Utah		Phoenix Municipal Stadium • Phoenix, AZ	**L** 0–10	Van Sickle (2–0)	**Jacobs (3–2)**	–	15–19	6–10
Apr 13	Utah		Phoenix Municipal Stadium • Phoenix, AZ	**W** 8–3	**Markl (3–2)**	Jones (2–2)	**Omlid (1)**	16–19	7–10
Apr 14	Utah		Phoenix Municipal Stadium • Phoenix, AZ	**L** 5–11	Hostert (4—3)	**Schiefer (0–3)**	–	16–20	7–11
Apr 16	at Cal State Fullerton		Goodwin Field • Fullerton, CA	**W** 3–1	**Halvorson (1–2)**	Blood (2–3)	**Alba (1)**	17–20	–
Apr 17	at Cal State Fullerton		Goodwin Field • Fullerton, CA	**L** 4–14^{7}	Krakoski (2–0)	**Behrens (2–3)**	–	17–21	–
Apr 19	at UCLA		Jackie Robinson Stadium • Los Angeles, CA	**W** 5–3	**Jacobs (4–2)**	Jewett (1–4)	**Schiefer (3)**	18–21	8–11
Apr 20	at UCLA		Jackie Robinson Stadium • Los Angeles, CA	**W** 8–2	**Markl (4–2)**	Barnett (3–2)	–	19–21	9–11
Apr 21	at UCLA		Jackie Robinson Stadium • Los Angeles, CA	**W** 13–1	**Carlon (3–1)**	Stump (0–3)	–	20–21	10–11
Apr 26	USC		Phoenix Municipal Stadium • Phoenix, AZ	**W** 12–1	**Jacobs (5–1)**	Stromsborg (2–8)	–	21–21	11–11
Apr 27	USC		Phoenix Municipal Stadium • Phoenix, AZ	**W** 17–2	**Markl (5–2)**	Ebner (2–1)	–	22–21	12–11
Apr 28	USC		Phoenix Municipal Stadium • Phoenix, AZ	**L** 6–11	Watson (2–1)	**Halvorson (1–3)**	–	22–22	12–12
Apr 30	UC San Diego		Phoenix Municipal Stadium • Phoenix, AZ	**W** 15–5^{7}	**Cornelius (3–0)**	Ernisse (1–3)	–	23–22	–
May 1	UC San Diego		Phoenix Municipal Stadium • Phoenix, AZ	**W** 19–8^{7}	**Barnes (1–1)**	Chriss (1–1)	–	24–22	–
May 3	Washington		Phoenix Municipal Stadium • Phoenix, AZ	**W** 11–7^{10}	**Fitzpatrick (1–2)**	Cunningham (3–3)	–	25–22	13–12
May 4	Washington		Phoenix Municipal Stadium • Phoenix, AZ	**L** 9–14	Kirchoff (4–3)	**Markl (5–3)**	Boyle (3)	25–23	13–13
May 5	Washington		Phoenix Municipal Stadium • Phoenix, AZ	**W** 21–18	**Schiefer (1–3)**	Parkin (1–1)	–	26–23	14–12
May 7	No. 17 Arizona		Phoenix Municipal Stadium • Phoenix, AZ	**L** 3–5	Hintz (3–1)	**Halvorson (1–4)**	Susac (2)	26–24	–
May 10	at Stanford		Klein Field at Sunken Diamond • Stanford, CA	**W** 13–1	**Jacobs (6–2)**	Scott (4–8)	–	27–24	15–13
May 11	at Stanford		Klein Field at Sunken Diamond • Stanford, CA	**W** 10–1	**Markl (6–3)**	Lim (4–6)	**Giblin (1)**	28–24	16–13
May 12	at Stanford		Klein Field at Sunken Diamond • Stanford, CA	**W** 16–7	**Fitzpatrick (2–2)**	O'Harran (1–3)	–	29–24	17–13
May 16	Texas Tech		Phoenix Municipal Stadium • Phoenix, AZ	**W** 21–5	**Jacobs (7–2)**	Hutyra (4–3)	–	30–24	–
May 17	Texas Tech		Phoenix Municipal Stadium • Phoenix, AZ	**W** 17–11	**Fitzpatrick (3–2)**	Lysik (0–1)	–	31–24	–
May 18	UNLV		Phoenix Municipal Stadium • Phoenix, AZ	**W** 14–13	**Eddy (1–0)**	Maloney (3–4)	–	32–24	–
Pac-12 Conference Tournament
May 21	vs. Stanford (8)	(5)	Scottsdale Stadium • Scottsdale, AZ	**L** 7–8	O'Harran (2–4)	**Markl (6–4)**	Dugan (3)	32–25	–
May 23	vs. Oregon State (2)	(5)	Scottsdale Stadium • Scottsdale, AZ	**L** 2–3	Keljo (4–0)	**Jacobs (7–3)**	Holmes (12)	32–26	–

== Rankings ==
Ranking movements Legend: ██ Increase in ranking ██ Decrease in ranking — = Not ranked RV = Received votes
	Week																		
Poll	Pre	1	2	3	4	5	6	7	8	9	10	11	12	13	14	15	16	17	Final
Coaches'	—	—*	—	—	—	—	—	—	—	—	—	—	—	—	—	—	—	—	
Baseball America	—	—	—	—	—	—	—	—	—	—	—	—	—	—	—	—	—	—	
NCBWA†	RV	—	—	—	—	—	—	—	—	—	—	—	—	—	—	—	—	—	
D1Baseball	—	—	—	—	—	—	—	—	—	—	—	—	—	—	—	—	—	—	
Perfect Game	—	—	—	—	—	—	—	—	—	—	—	—	—	—	—	—	—	—	

† NCBWA ranks 30 teams in their preseason poll, but only ranks 25 teams weekly during the season.
* A new poll was not released for this week, so for comparison purposes, the previous week's ranking is inserted in this week's slot.
