= George C. Page Stadium =

Baseball venue in Los Angeles, California

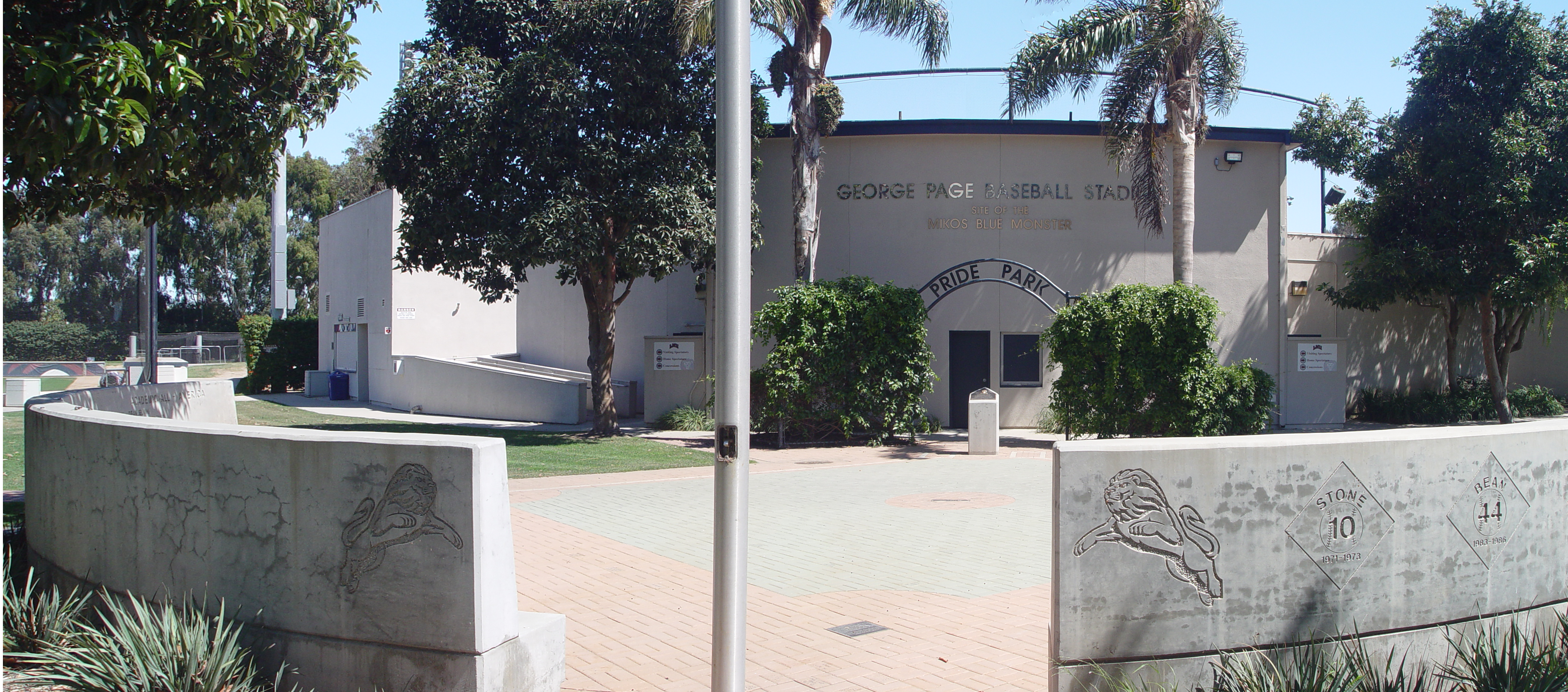
- Pride Park, outside Page Stadium
- Interactive map of George C. Page Stadium
- Location: Loyola Boulevard, Los Angeles, CA, USA
- Coordinates: 33.967055°N 118.414921°W
- Owner: Loyola Marymount University
- Operator: Loyola Marymount University
- Capacity: 1,000
- Surface: Grass
- Scoreboard: Manual, 18 ft. x 46 ft.
- Field size: Left Field: 326 ft (99 m); Left-Center Field: 362 ft (110 m); Center Field: 405 ft (123 m); Right-Center Field: 365 ft (111 m); Right Field: 321 ft (98 m)

Construction
- Built: 1983
- Opened: March 19, 1983
- Renovated: 2001, 2004, 2008
- Cost: $250,000

Tenant
- Loyola Marymount Lions baseball (1983-present)

Website
- George C. Page Stadium

George C. Page Stadium is a baseball venue in Los Angeles, California, USA. It is home to the Loyola Marymount Lions baseball team of the NCAA's Division I West Coast Conference. Opened in 1983, it has a capacity of 1,200 spectators. The stadium is named for George C. Page, head of the Incentive Aid Foundation, which covered much of the venue's construction costs. Features of Page include a "Blue Monster" in left field, training areas, and reception facilities.

In the stadium's first game, played on March 19, 1983, Loyola Marymount lost to Cal State Fullerton 5-1. As of 2011, the Lions' all-time record at Page Stadium was 471-352-4 (.572). Their best single-season mark came in 1988, when they had a 30-5 (.857) record.

== Features ==
Of the venue's 1,200 person capacity, 200 is theatre seating and 400 is metal bleachers with chairbacks. Standing room and a first-base side picnic area account for the remaining 600.

The field's generic features include a press box and concession stands, and recent renovations have added more to the facility.

=== Mikos Blue Monster ===
Modeled after Fenway Park's Green Monster, the Mikos Blue Monster stands 37 ft (11 m). high and 130 ft (40 m). wide in left field. It contains an 18 ft (5.5 m). by 46 ft (14 m). manual scoreboard, also much like Fenway's. A gift by LMU alumnus Paul Mikos (Class of 1966) allowed the wall and scoreboard to be constructed in 2001.

=== The Lion's Cage ===
The Lion's Cage is an all-weather practice facility that was built during the 2007-08 offseason. The 8,000-square-foot (740 m^{2}) facility contains batting cages, pitching mounds, open spaces, and strength and conditioning areas. Large doors on either side of the den allow for all-weather use.

=== Pride Park ===
Built after the 2004 season, Pride Park is a meeting and reception area at the entrance of Page Stadium. With a surface modeled as a miniature baseball diamond, it is often used for alumni events.

Page Stadium

== Other uses ==
Page has hosted four West Coast Conference baseball tournaments. It also hosts youth baseball games and clinics.

The stadium is often used as a filming locale. Its most notable role in this capacity was in the 1990 movie My Blue Heaven, which starred Steve Martin.

The stadium also hosted the 2025 Major League Wiffle Ball World Series between the Midwest Mallards and Great Lakes Gators, which the Mallards ended up winning in five games. The stadium was used for filming the Star Trek Deep Space 9 episode "Take me out to the Holosuite"

== See also ==
- List of NCAA Division I baseball venues
