= Oregon State Beavers baseball statistical leaders =

The Oregon State Beavers baseball statistical leaders are individual statistical leaders of the Oregon State Beavers baseball program in various categories, including batting average, home runs, runs batted in, runs, hits, stolen bases, ERA, and Strikeouts. Within those areas, the lists identify single-game, single-season, and career leaders. The Beavers represent the Oregon State University Independentof conference in the NCAA.

Oregon State began competing in intercollegiate baseball in 1893. These lists are updated through the end of the 2025 season.

== Batting Average ==
Career (minimum 260 at-bats)
Rk	Player	AVG	Seasons
1	Jay Dean	.379	1952 1953 1954 1955
2	A.J. Marquardt	.373	1993 1994
3	Jacoby Ellsbury	.365	2003 2004 2005
4	Jacob Melton	.364	2020 2021 2022
5	Joe Gerber	.362	1997 1998 1999 2000
	Brian Barden	.362	2000 2001 2002
7	Nick Madrigal	.361	2016 2017 2018
8	Travis Bazzana	.360	2022 2023 2024
9	Ben Bertrand	.358	1996 1997 1998
10	Justin Boyd	.357	2021 2022

Season (minimum 120 at-bats)
Rk	Player	AVG	Season
1	Randy Duke	.423	1987
2	Dwane Helbig	.411	1952
	Adley Rutschman	.411	2019
4	Adley Rutschman	.408	2018
5	Travis Bazzana	.407	2024
6	Jacoby Ellsbury	.406	2005
7	Dan Cunningham	.405	1971
8	Ken Bowen	.404	1987
9	Jason Stranberg	.397	1997
10	Chris Biles	.395	2001

== Home Runs ==
Career
Rk	Player	HR	Seasons
1	Gavin Turley	53	2023 2024 2025
2	Travis Bazzana	45	2022 2023 2024
3	Joe Gerber	34	1997 1998 1999 2000
	Andy Jarvis	34	2000 2001 2002 2003
5	Michael Conforto	31	2012 2013 2014
6	KJ Harrison	29	2015 2016 2017
7	Al Hunsinger	28	1980 1981
	Adley Rutschman	28	2017 2018 2019
	Jacob Krieg	28	2023 2024 2025 2026
10	Bob McNair	27	1978 1979 1980
	Jim Wilson	27	1980 1981 1982

Season
Rk	Player	HR	Season
1	Travis Bazzana	28	2024
2	Jim Wilson	21	1982
3	Gavin Turley	20	2025
4	Trevor Larnach	19	2018
	Gavin Turley	19	2024
	Aiva Arquette	19	2025
7	Adley Rutschman	17	2019
	Jacob Melton	17	2022
9	Al Hunsinger	15	1981
10	Bob McNair	14	1980
	Gavin Turley	14	2023
	Jacob Krieg	14	2025

Single Game
Rk	Player	Season	Opponent	HR
1	multiple times			3

== Runs Batted In ==
Career
Rk	Player	RBI	Seasons
1	Gavin Turley	189	2023 2024 2025
2	Michael Conforto	179	2012 2013 2014
3	Adley Rutschman	174	2017 2018 2019
4	Andy Jarvis	173	2000 2001 2002 2003
5	Joe Gerber	169	1997 1998 1999 2000
6	Travis Bazzana	165	2022 2023 2024
7	Dylan Davis	155	2012 2013 2014
8	Brian Barden	154	2000 2001 2002
9	Mitch Canham	152	2004 2005 2006 2007
10	KJ Harrison	150	2015 2016 2017

Season
Rk	Player	RBI	Season
1	Adley Rutschman	83	2018
	Jacob Melton	83	2022
3	Trevor Larnach	77	2018
4	Michael Conforto	76	2012
5	Gavin Turley	74	2024
6	Gavin Turley	69	2025
7	Joe Gerber	67	2000
8	Travis Bazzana	66	2024
	Aiva Arquette	66	2025
10	Dylan Davis	64	2014

Single Game
Rk	Player	RBI	Season	Opponent
1	Ken Bowen	9	1985	Chico State

== Runs ==
Career
Rk	Player	R	Seasons
1	Travis Bazzana	220	2022 2023 2024
2	Jacoby Ellsbury	168	2003 2004 2005
3	Darwin Barney	152	2005 2006 2007
4	Adley Rutschman	151	2017 2018 2019
	Gavin Turley	151	2023 2024 2025
6	Ken Bowen	150	1984 1985 1986 1987
7	Todd Thomas	148	1980 1981 1982 1983
	Brian Barden	148	2000 2001 2002
9	Michael Conforto	145	2012 2013 2014
10	Shea McFeely	142	2004 2005 2006

Season
Rk	Player	R	Season
1	Travis Bazzana	84	2024
2	Cole Gillespie	83	2006
3	Wade Meckler	81	2022
4	Travis Bazzana	78	2023
5	Aiva Arquette	73	2025
6	Trevor Larnach	72	2018
	Justin Boyd	72	2022
8	Cadyn Grenier	70	2018
9	Jason Stranberg	67	1997
10	Jacob Melton	66	2022

Single Game
Rk	Player	R	Season	Opponent
1	Bobby Buob	6	1954	Wash.
	Jim Ruggles	6	1954	Wash.
	Ken Bowen	6	1985	Chico State

== Hits ==
Career
Rk	Player	H	Seasons
1	Travis Bazzana	251	2022 2023 2024
2	Darwin Barney	238	2005 2006 2007
3	Jacoby Ellsbury	236	2003 2004 2005
4	Andy Jarvis	232	2000 2001 2002 2003
5	Brian Barden	231	2000 2001 2002
6	Michael Conforto	227	2012 2013 2014
	Adley Rutschman	227	2017 2018 2019
8	Nick Madrigal	221	2016 2017 2018
9	Kavin Keyes	212	2011 2012 2013 2014
10	Garret Forrester	208	2021 2022 2023

Season
Rk	Player	H	Season
1	Adley Rutschman	102	2018
2	Jacoby Ellsbury	99	2005
3	Jacob Melton	94	2022
4	Wade Meckler	93	2022
5	Steven Kwan	91	2018
6	Nick Madrigal	90	2017
	Justin Boyd	90	2022
	Aiva Arquette	90	2025
9	Trevor Larnach	89	2018
	Travis Bazzana	89	2023

Single Game
Rk	Player	H	Season	Opponent
1	Justin Boyd	6	2022	UCLA
	Aiva Arquette	6	2025	CSUN

== Stolen Bases ==
Career
Rk	Player	SB	Seasons
1	Travis Bazzana	66	2022 2023 2024
2	Todd Thomas	62	1980 1981 1982 1983
3	Jacoby Ellsbury	60	2003 2004 2005
4	Jeff Doyle	54	1975 1976 1977
5	Steve Lyons	46	1979 1980 1981
6	Kim Bradshaw	44	1957 1958 1959
7	Steve Smith	41	1981 1982 1983
8	Rich Dodge	40	1974 1975 1976 1977
9	R.A. Neitzel	39	1988 1989 1990
	Tyler Graham	39	2003 2004 2005 2006
	Nick Madrigal	39	2016 2017 2018
	Easton Talt	39	2023 2024 2025 2026

Season
Rk	Player	SB	Season
1	Travis Bazzana	36	2023
2	Dave Brundage	29	1986
3	Jeff Brauning	28	1989
4	Kim Bradshaw	26	1957
	Jeff Doyle	26	1977
	Jacoby Ellsbury	26	2005
	Easton Talt	26	2026
8	Steve Lyons	25	1980
9	Jeff Doyle	24	1976
	Justin Boyd	24	2022

Single Game
Rk	Player	SB	Season	Opponent
1	Travis Bazzana	5	2023	Seattle

== Earned Run Average ==
Career (minimum 120 innings pitched)
Rk	Player	ERA	Seasons
1	Cecil Ira	1.79	1961 1962 1963
2	Steve Clark	1.92	1962 1963 1964
3	Andrew Moore	2.10	2013 2014 2015
4	Ken Forsch	2.12	1967 1968
5	Matt Boyd	2.13	2010 2011 2012 2013
6	Scott Anderson	2.15	1981 1982 1983 1984
7	Jace Fry	2.16	2012 2013 2014
8	Brandon Eisert	2.28	2017 2018 2019
9	Scott Schultz	2.42	2011 2012 2013 2014
10	Luke Heimlich	2.49	2015 2016 2017 2018

Season (minimum 40 innings pitched)
Rk	Player	ERA	Season
1	Luke Heimlich	0.76	2017
2	Ben Wetzler	0.78	2014
3	Bill Oerding	1.07	1960
4	Jake Mulholland	1.20	2017
5	Cecil Ira	1.23	1962
6	Ken Noble	1.26	1976
7	Steve Clark	1.46	1964
8	Tony Bryant	1.52	2011
9	Jack Humphrey	1.53	1967
10	Matt Boyd	1.57	2011

== Strikeouts ==
Career
Rk	Player	K	Seasons
1	Luke Heimlich	385	2015 2016 2017 2018
2	Jonah Nickerson	299	2004 2005 2006
3	Ben Wetzler	291	2011 2012 2013 2014
4	Mike Stutes	287	2006 2007 2008
5	Cooper Hjerpe	275	2020 2021 2022
6	Dallas Buck	272	2004 2005 2006
7	Mason Smith	267	1991 1992 1993 1994
8	John Sipple	263	1984 1985 1986 1987 1988
9	Scott Anderson	258	1981 1982 1983 1984
10	Andrew Moore	251	2013 2014 2015

Season
Rk	Player	K	Season
1	Cooper Hjerpe	161	2022
2	Luke Heimlich	159	2018
3	Jonah Nickerson	131	2006
4	Mike Stutes	129	2007
5	Luke Heimlich	128	2017
6	Matt Boyd	122	2013
7	Ken Forsch	121	1968
8	Dax Whitney	120	2025
9	Scott Christman	119	1993
	Jake Thompson	119	2017

Single Game
Rk	Player	K	Season	Opponent
1	Mason Smith	17	1994	Portland
	Cooper Hjerpe	17	2022	Stanford
	Dax Whitney	17	2026	Baylor
