= 2026 Oregon State Beavers baseball team =

College baseball team in the 2025 NCAA Division I season

2026 Oregon State Beavers baseball

Eugene Regional, 2–2
- Conference: Independent

Ranking
- Coaches: No. 20
- D1Baseball.com: No. 22
- Record: 45–14
- Head coach: Mitch Canham (7th season)
- Assistant coaches: Ryan Gipson (8th season); Joey Wong (3rd season)
- Pitching coach: Rich Dorman (7th season)
- Home stadium: Goss Stadium at Coleman Field

2026 NCAA Division I baseball independents standings
	Conf.				Overall
Team	W		L	PCT	W		L	PCT
No. 22 Oregon State ‍‍‍^{y}	0	–	0	–	43	–	12	.782
As of May 16, 2026; Rankings from D1Baseball

The 2026 Oregon State Beavers baseball team represented Oregon State University in the 2026 NCAA Division I baseball season. The Beavers play their home games at Goss Stadium at Coleman Field. The team was led by Mitch Canham, the Pat Casey Head Baseball Coach, in his 7th season at Oregon State.

The team competed as an independent, as the university is one of only two remaining members of the Pac-12 Conference.

== Roster ==
2026 Oregon State Beavers roster
Pitchers: 12 - Tanner Douglas - Senior; 24 - Ethan Kleinschmit - Junior; 28 - Calvin Gregory - Freshman; 30 - Trey Morris - Freshman; 34 - Max Fraser - Junior; 0 - Isaac Yeager - Senior; 8 - Dax Whitney - Sophomore; 16 - Eric Segura - Junior; 19 - Wyatt Queen - Junior; 29 - Albert Roblez - Senior; 31 - Trevor Kaiser - Freshman; 32 - AJ Hutcheson - Senior; 33 - Noah Scott - Junior; 35 - Zach Kmatz - Sophomore; 36 - Jack Giordano - Sophomore; 44 - Tyler Bellerose - Freshman; 50 - Zach Edwards - Sophomore; 51 - Connor Mendez - Junior	Catchers: 10 - Bryce Hubbard - Senior; 13 - Jacob Galloway - Senior; 43 - Martin Serrano - Sophomore; Infielders: 1 - Cooper Vance - Senior; 7 - AJ Singer - Senior; 14 - Tyler Inge - Sophomore; 20 - Bryson Glassco - Junior; 21 - Josh Proctor - Freshman; 22 - Jacob Krieg - Senior; 27 - Paul Vazquez - Sophomore; 40 - Kameron Beck - Freshman	Outfielders: 6 - Easton Talt - Senior; 9 - Jace Miller - Junior; 26 - Eli Gries-Smith - Senior	Two Way Players: 15 - Ryan VandenBrink - Sophomore; 2 - Nyan Hayes - Senior; 17 - Ethan Porter - Freshman; 3 - Mason Pike - Freshman; 4 - Adam Haight - Sophomore

=== Coaches ===
2026 Oregon State Beavers baseball coaching staff
- Mitch Canham – Head coach – 7th season
- Ryan Gipson – Assistant coach – 8th season
- Joey Wong – Assistant coach – 3rd season
- Rich Dorman – Pitching coach – 7th season

Note: Season counter accounts for all stints at Oregon State.

== Personnel ==
=== Starters ===
Opening Night Lineup
Pos.	No.	Player.	Year
2B	7	AJ Singer	Sr.
RF	6	Easton Talt	Sr.
SS	1	Cooper Vance	Sr.
DH	10	Bryce Hubbard	Sr.
1B	22	Jacob Krieg	Sr.
LF	4	Adam Haight	So.
3B	27	Paul Vazquez	So.
C	13	Jacob Galloway	Sr.
CF	2	Nyan Hayes	Sr.

Weekend pitching rotation
Day	No.	Player.	Year
Friday	8	Dax Whitney	So.
Saturday	24	Ethan Kleinschmit	Jr.
Sunday	16	Eric Segura	Jr.

== Offseason ==
=== 2025 MLB draft ===
Seven Beavers were selected in the 2025 Major League Baseball draft.

Round	Pick	Player	Position	MLB Team
#1	#7	Aiva Arquette	SS	Miami Marlins
#4	#110	Gavin Turley	OF	Athletics
#6	#192	Nelson Keljo	LHP	Cleveland Guardians
#9	#276	Kellan Oakes	RHP	Houston Astros
#12	#348	Wilson Weber	C	Miami Marlins
#15	#457	Dallas Macias	OF	Atlanta Braves
#18	#533	Canon Reeder	OF	Pittsburgh Pirates

== Schedule and results ==
2026 Oregon State Beavers baseball game log (Overall: 45–14); (Home: 21–6; Away: 15–3; Neutral: 9–5)
Regular season (43–12)
February (5–4)
(Home; 0–0; Away: 0–0; Neutral: 5–4)

Date	Time	Opponent	Rank	TV	Venue	Score	Win	Loss	Save	Attendance	Overall record
College Baseball Series
February 13	1:00 p.m.	Michigan	No. 12	FloSports	Surprise Stadium • Surprise, Arizona	**L** 3–5	Brinham (1–0)	**Yeager** (0–1)	DeVooght (1)	5,683	0–1
February 14	1:00 p.m.	No. 24 Arizona	No. 12	FloSports	Surprise Stadium • Surprise, Arizona	**W** 7–6	**Scott** (1–0)	Hickman (0–1)	**Roblez** (1)	6,294	1–1
February 15	11:00 a.m.	Stanford	No. 12	FloSports	Surprise Stadium • Surprise, Arizona	**W** 3–2	**Yeager** (1–1)	Erspamer (0–1)	None	6,027	2–1
February 16	11:00 a.m.	Michigan	No. 11	FloSports	Surprise Stadium • Surprise, Arizona	**W** 5–4^{10}	**Giordano** (1–0)	Barr (0–1)	None	3,273	3–1
Round Rock Classic
February 20	2:00 p.m.	Baylor	No. 11	D1Baseball	Dell Diamond • Round Rock, Texas	**W** 3–1	**Yeager** (2–1)	Bunch (1–1)	**Roblez** (2)	3,572	4–1
February 21	3:00 p.m.	No. 20 Southern Miss	No. 11	D1Baseball	Dell Diamond • Round Rock, Texas	**L** 4–9	Harris (1–0)	**Kleinschmit** (0–1)	**Sunstrom** (1)	4,391	4–2
February 22	9:00 a.m.	Purdue	No. 11	D1Baseball	Dell Diamond • Round Rock, Texas	**L** 2–5	Evans (1–0)	**Segura** (0–1)	Kramer (1)	3,245	4–3
Frisco College Baseball Classic
February 27	12:00 p.m.	Houston	No. 19	D1Baseball	Riders Field • Frisco, Texas	**W** 2–1	**Whitney** (1–0)	Scinta (1–2)	**Roblez** (3)		5–3
February 28	2:00 p.m.	Alabama	No. 19	D1Baseball	Riders Field • Frisco, Texas	**L** 7–8	Heiberger (1–0)	**Kleinschmit** (0–2)	Banks (2)	5,771	5–4

March (16–2)
(Home; 7–1; Away: 8–1; Neutral: 1–0)

Date	Time	Opponent	Rank	TV	Venue	Score	Win	Loss	Save	Attendance	Overall record
March 1	9:00 a.m.	Iowa	No. 19	D1Baseball	Riders Field • Frisco, Texas	**W** 4–3	**Yeager** (3–1)	Terhaar (1–1)	**Roblez** (4)		6–4
March 3	3:05 p.m.	at Oregon	No. 18	B1G+	PK Park • Eugene, Oregon	**W** 10–6	**Scott** (2–0)	Gosztola (0–1)	None	3,634	7–4
March 6	5:35 p.m.	vs Xavier	No. 18	KRCW-TV	Goss Stadium at Coleman Field • Corvallis, Oregon	**W** 4–2	**Whitney** (2–0)	Piech (1–2)	**Roblez** (5)	3,721	8–4
March 7	1:35 p.m.	vs Xavier	No. 18	KOIN	Goss Stadium at Coleman Field • Corvallis, Oregon	**W** 7–2	**Kleinschmit** (1–2)	Nobe (1–1)	None	3,955	9–4
March 8	1:05 p.m.	vs Xavier	No. 18	KRCW-TV	Goss Stadium at Coleman Field • Corvallis, Oregon	**W** 17–2	**Segura** (1–1)	DeTienne (0–4)	None	3,699	10–4
March 9	5:35 p.m.	vs Xavier	No. 18	KRCW-TV	Goss Stadium at Coleman Field • Corvallis, Oregon	**W** 7–2	**Hutcheson** (1–0)	Muck (1–1)	None	3,613	11–4
March 13	6:00 p.m.	at San Diego	No. 18	ESPN+	Fowler Park • San Diego, California	**W** 7–5	**Whitney** (3–0)	Gutierrez (1–2)	**Roblez** (6)	1,641	12–4
March 14	5:00 p.m.	at San Diego	No. 18	ESPN+	Fowler Park • San Diego, California	**W** 11–5	**Kleinschmit** (2–2)	Bade (1–2)	None	1,431	13–4
March 15	1:00 p.m.	at San Diego	No. 18	ESPN+	Fowler Park • San Diego, California	**W** 10–3	**Segura** (2–1)	Frize (1–3)	None	1,325	14–4
March 17	5:35 p.m.	at Portland	No. 17	ESPN+	Joe Etzel Field • Portland, Oregon	**L** 1–3	Gaston (3–0)	**Mendez** (0–1)	Segel (2)	1,000	14–5
March 20	6:00 p.m.	at UC Irvine	No. 17	ESPN+	Cicerone Field at Anteater Ballpark • Irvine, California	**W** 5–1	**Whitney** (4–0)	Hansen (3–1)	None	1,008	15–5
March 21	1:00 p.m.	at UC Irvine	No. 17	ESPN+	Cicerone Field at Anteater Ballpark • Irvine, California	**W** 5–3	**Kleinschmit** (3–2)	Ojeda (1–3)	**Roblez** (7)	936	16–5
March 22	1:00 p.m.	at UC Irvine	No. 17	ESPN+	Cicerone Field at Anteater Ballpark • Irvine, California	**W** 9–5	**Morris** (1–0)	Wall (1–1)	**Edwards** (1)	1,004	17–5
March 24	1:00 p.m.	at No. 12 USC	No. 16	B1G+	Dedeaux Field • Los Angeles, California	**W** 12–4	**Mendez** (1–1)	Herrell (2–1)	None	985	18–5
March 27	5:35 p.m.	vs Mercer	No. 16	KRCW-TV	Goss Stadium at Coleman Field • Corvallis, Oregon	**W** 7–5	**Edwards** (1–0)	Ewaldsen (1–1)	**Roblez** (8)	3,899	19–5
March 28	1:35 p.m.	vs Mercer	No. 16	KRCW-TV	Goss Stadium at Coleman Field • Corvallis, Oregon	**W** 19–2	**Kleinschmit** (4–2)	Hugas (6–1)	None	4,038	20–5
March 29	1:05 p.m.	vs Mercer	No. 16	KRCW-TV	Goss Stadium at Coleman Field • Corvallis, Oregon	**W** 3–1	**Yeager** (4–1)	Hayse (1–1)	**Roblez** (9)	3,784	21–5
March 31	5:35 p.m.	vs Washington	No. 9	KRCW-TV	Goss Stadium at Coleman Field • Corvallis, Oregon	**L** 2–18	Lierman (2–0)	**Mendez** (1–2)	None	3,714	21–6

April (13–4)
(Home; 9–3; Away: 4–1; Neutral: 0–0)

Date	Time	Opponent	Rank	TV	Venue	Score	Win	Loss	Save	Attendance	Overall record
April 2	6:00 p.m.	at Lamar	No. 9	ESPN+	Vincent-Beck Stadium • Beaumont, Texas	**W** 2–0	**Queen** (1–0)	Williams (0–2)	**Roblez** (10)	1,207	22–6
April 3	4:05 p.m.	at Lamar	No. 9	ESPN+	Vincent-Beck Stadium • Beaumont, Texas	**W** 8–0	**Whitney** (5–0)	Olivier (4–1)	None	1,412	23–6
April 4	1:05 p.m.	at Lamar	No. 9	ESPN+	Vincent-Beck Stadium • Beaumont, Texas	**W** 10–3	**Kleinschmit** (5–2)	Carpio (1–2)	None	1,101	24–6
April 6	4:05 p.m.	at Washington State	No. 7	MW Network	Bailey-Brayton Field • Pullman, Washington	**W** 18–0^{7}	**Segura** (3–1)	Blatter (0–1)	None	1,446	25–6
April 7	1:05 p.m.	at Washington State	No. 7	MW Network	Bailey-Brayton Field • Pullman, Washington	**L** 6–7	Haider (3–0)	**Scott** (2–1)	None	1,125	25–7
April 10	5:35 p.m.	vs Cal Poly	No. 7	KRCW-TV	Goss Stadium at Coleman Field • Corvallis, Oregon	**W** 6–3	**Morris** (2–0)	Estes (3–1)	**Roblez** (11)	3,947	26–7
April 11	1:35 p.m.	vs Cal Poly	No. 7	KOIN	Goss Stadium at Coleman Field • Corvallis, Oregon	**W** 11–6	**Kleinschmit** (6–2)	Turnquist (2–2)	None	3,952	27–7
April 12	1:05 p.m.	vs Cal Poly	No. 7	KRCW-TV	Goss Stadium at Coleman Field • Corvallis, Oregon	**W** 3–2	**Roblez** (1–0)	Bonn (0–3)	None	3,832	28–7
April 14	6:00 p.m.	No. 19 Oregon	No. 6	KOIN	Hillsboro Ballpark • Hillsboro, Oregon	Postponed					
April 17	5:35 p.m.	vs Cal State Fullerton	No. 6	KRCW-TV	Goss Stadium at Coleman Field • Corvallis, Oregon	**L** 1–2	Negrete (7–2)	**Whitney** (5–1)	None	3,951	28–8
April 18	3:05 p.m.	vs Cal State Fullerton	No. 6	KOIN	Goss Stadium at Coleman Field • Corvallis, Oregon	**W** 6–1	**Edwards** (2–0)	Wright (2–4)	None	4,056	29–8
April 19	1:05 p.m.	vs Cal State Fullerton	No. 6	KRCW-TV	Goss Stadium at Coleman Field • Corvallis, Oregon	**W** 10–2	**Segura** (4–1)	Smith (2–4)	None	4,004	30–8
April 22	5:35 p.m.	vs No. 19 Oregon	No. 6	KRCW-TV	Goss Stadium at Coleman Field • Corvallis, Oregon	**L** 3–7	Twist (3–0)	**Queen** (1–1)	None	3,981	30–9
April 24	5:35 p.m.	vs Hawaii	No. 6	KRCW-TV	Goss Stadium at Coleman Field • Corvallis, Oregon	**W** 12–4	**Whitney** (6–1)	Magdaleno (4–4)	None	3,977	31–9
April 25	1:35 p.m.	vs Hawaii	No. 6	KOIN	Goss Stadium at Coleman Field • Corvallis, Oregon	**W** 8–1	**Kleinschmit** (7–2)	Robello (7–3)	None	4,090	32–9
April 26	1:35 p.m.	vs Hawaii	No. 6	KRCW-TV	Goss Stadium at Coleman Field • Corvallis, Oregon	**W** 3–1	**Yeager** (5–1)	Tomii (3–1)	**Roblez** (11)	4,020	33–9
April 28	5:35 p.m.	vs UTRGV	No. 6	KRCW-TV	Goss Stadium at Coleman Field • Corvallis, Oregon	**W** 4–2	**Morris** (3–0)	Bonilla (0–2)	**Roblez** (13)	3,536	34–9
April 29	5:35 p.m.	vs UTRGV	No. 6	KRCW-TV	Goss Stadium at Coleman Field • Corvallis, Oregon	**L** 7–9	Garcia (2–1)	**Mendez** (1–3)	Wanless (1)	3,619	34–10

May (9–2)
(Home: 5–2; Away: 3–0; Neutral: 1–0)

Date	Time	Opponent	Rank	TV	Venue	Score	Win	Loss	Save	Attendance	Overall record
May 1	5:35 p.m.	vs CSUN	No. 6	KRCW-TV	Goss Stadium at Coleman Field • Corvallis, Oregon	**L** 6–8	Voorhies (4–2)	**Roblez (1–1)**	None	3,961	34–11
May 2	3:05 p.m.	vs CSUN	No. 6	KOIN	Goss Stadium at Coleman Field • Corvallis, Oregon	**W** 6–5^{11}	**Yeager** (6–1)	Carson (1–1)	None	4,103	35–11
May 3	1:05 p.m.	vs CSUN	No. 6	KRCW-TV	Goss Stadium at Coleman Field • Corvallis, Oregon	**W** 5–2	**Morris** (4–0)	Rogers (0–2)	**Roblez** (14)	4,022	36–11
May 5	5:35 p.m.	Portland	No. 10	KUNP	Hillsboro Ballpark • Hillsboro, Oregon	**W** 6–4^{12}	**Roblez** (2–1)	Dufort (0–1)	**Scott** (1)	4,430	37–11
May 8	6:05 p.m.	at Long Beach State	No. 10	ESPN+	Blair Field • Long Beach, California	**W** 7–2	**Kleinschmit** (8–2)	Kahaleiki (0–4)	None	2,170	38–11
May 9	6:05 p.m.	at Long Beach State	No. 10	ESPN+	Blair Field • Long Beach, California	**W** 8–1	**Segura** (5–1)	Howe (5–3)	**Edwards** (2)	1,868	39–11
May 10	12:05 p.m.	at Long Beach State	No. 10	ESPN+	Blair Field • Long Beach, California	**W** 8–4	**Morris** (5–0)	Gerfers (3–7)	None	1,586	40–11
May 12	5:35 p.m.	vs Portland	No. 7	KRCW-TV	Goss Stadium at Coleman Field • Corvallis, Oregon	**W** 8–3	**Mendez** (2–3)	Gaston (4–3)	None	3,698	41–11
May 14	5:35 p.m.	vs Air Force	No. 7	KRCW-TV	Goss Stadium at Coleman Field • Corvallis, Oregon	**W** 7–4	**Kleinschmit** (9–2)	Poe (4–3)	**Queen** (2)	3,853	42–11
May 15	5:35 p.m.	vs Air Force	No. 7	KRCW-TV	Goss Stadium at Coleman Field • Corvallis, Oregon	**L** 6–9	Rutledge III (3–0)	**Segura** (5–2)	Davidson (4)	4,070	42–12
May 16	1:35 p.m.	vs Air Force	No. 7	KRCW-TV	Goss Stadium at Coleman Field • Corvallis, Oregon	**W** 8–1	**Morris** (6–0)	Brantingham (0–3)	None	4,041	43–12

Postseason (2–2)
Eugene Regional (2–2)

Date	Time	Opponent	Rank	TV	Venue	Score	Win	Loss	Save	Attendance	Overall record
May 29	12:00 p.m.	vs (3) Washington State	(2) No. 8	ESPNU	PK Park • Eugene, Oregon	**L** 2–3	Lewis (10–2)	**Queen** (1–2)	None	4,186	43–13
May 30	1:00 p.m.	vs (4) Yale	(2) No. 8	ESPN+	PK Park • Eugene, Oregon	**W** 9–2	**Segura** (6–2)	Evans (7–2)	None	3,945	44–13
May 31	1:00 p.m.	vs (3) Washington State	(2) No. 8	ESPN+	PK Park • Eugene, Oregon	**W** 10–1	**Morris** (7–0)	Smith (5–5)	None	4,085	45–13
May 31	6:00 p.m.	at (1) No. 15 Oregon	(2) No. 8	ESPN2	PK Park • Eugene, Oregon	**L** 1–4	Gosztola (3–3)	**Yeager** (6–2)	Bell (12)	4,278	45–14

"#" represents ranking. All rankings from D1 Baseball Poll on the date of the contest.
"()" represents postseason seeding in the NCAA Regional, respectively.
= Win, = Loss, = Canceled/Postponed
Bold = **Oregon State Beavers team member**

Schedule Source:

== Rankings ==
Ranking movements Legend: ██ Increase in ranking ██ Decrease in ranking — = Not ranked
	Week																	
Poll	Pre	1	2	3	4	5	6	7	8	9	10	11	12	13	14	15	16	Final
Coaches'	12	12*	18	18	17	16	14	9	7	6	6	6	8	7	7	8	8*	20
Baseball America	15	17	24	25	23	15	13	8	7	5	5	5	7	7	7	7*	7*	—
NCBWA†	11	13	19	22	19	16	14	8	7	5	6	5	7	6	6	6*	22	24
D1Baseball	12	11	19	18	18	17	16	9	7	6	6	6	10	7	7	8	8*	22
Perfect Game	7	7	16	21	21	18	15	9	9	6	6	6	10	9	9	9*	9*	—

† NCBWA ranks 30 teams in their preseason poll, but only ranks 25 teams weekly during the season.
* A new poll was not released for this week, so for comparison purposes, the previous week's ranking is inserted in this week's slot.

Key

ABCA	American Baseball Coaches Association
BA	Baseball America
CBF	College Baseball Foundation
D1	D1Baseball.com
NCBWA	National Collegiate Baseball Writers Association
PG	Perfect Game
	(#) Team selected, (F) Freshman team
