= 2024 Oregon State Beavers baseball team =

College baseball team in the 2024 NCAA Division I season

2024 Oregon State Beavers baseball

Corvallis Regional champions

Lexington Super Regional, 0–2
- Conference: Pac-12 Conference

Ranking
- Coaches: No. 11
- D1Baseball.com: No. 10
- Record: 45–16 (19–10 Pac-12)
- Head coach: Mitch Canham (5th season)
- Assistant coaches: Ryan Gipson (6th season); Joey Wong (1st season)
- Pitching coach: Rich Dorman (5th season)
- Home stadium: Goss Stadium at Coleman Field

2024 Pac-12 Conference baseball standings
| | Conf. | | | | | | Overall |
| Team | W | | L | | T | PCT | W | | L | | T | PCT |
|---|---|---|---|---|---|---|---|---|---|---|---|---|
| No. 25 Arizona ‍†‍‡‍^{y} | 20 | – | 10 | – | 0 | .667 | 36 | – | 23 | – | 0 | .610 |
| No. 10 Oregon State ‍‍‍^{y} | 19 | – | 10 | – | 0 | .655 | 42 | – | 14 | – | 0 | .750 |
| No. 12 Oregon ‍‍‍^{y} | 19 | – | 11 | – | 0 | .633 | 37 | – | 18 | – | 0 | .673 |
| USC ‍‍‍ | 17 | – | 12 | – | 0 | .586 | 31 | – | 28 | – | 0 | .525 |
| California ‍‍‍ | 17 | – | 13 | – | 0 | .567 | 36 | – | 19 | – | 0 | .655 |
| Arizona State ‍‍‍ | 17 | – | 13 | – | 0 | .567 | 32 | – | 26 | – | 0 | .552 |
| Utah ‍‍‍ | 16 | – | 14 | – | 0 | .533 | 33 | – | 22 | – | 0 | .600 |
| Stanford ‍‍‍ | 11 | – | 19 | – | 0 | .367 | 22 | – | 32 | – | 0 | .407 |
| Washington ‍‍‍ | 10 | – | 20 | – | 0 | .333 | 19 | – | 31 | – | 1 | .382 |
| Washington State ‍‍‍ | 9 | – | 21 | – | 0 | .300 | 21 | – | 32 | – | 0 | .396 |
| UCLA ‍‍‍ | 9 | – | 21 | – | 0 | .300 | 19 | – | 33 | – | 0 | .365 |
† – Conference champion ‡ – Tournament champion y – Invited to the NCAA Tournament; As of May 25, 2024; Rankings from D1Baseball

The 2024 Oregon State Beavers baseball team represented Oregon State University in the 2024 NCAA Division I baseball season. The Beavers played their home games at Goss Stadium at Coleman Field as members of the Pac-12 Conference. This was the final year the Beavers baseball team played as members of the Pac-12 Conference. They begin competing as an independent in 2025. The team was led by the Pat Casey Head Baseball Coach Mitch Canham in his fifth season at Oregon State.

== Preseason ==
Following the 2023 season, assistant coach Darwin Barney declined to return for a fourth year on the Beaver's coaching staff, clearing a spot for former 2007 national champion teammate Joey Wong. Wong had previously served as an assistant coach on the 2020 team.

The team returned six starters from the 2023 squad and augmented the roster with players from the transfer portal and a Freshman class ranked in the top-10 by D1 Baseball and Baseball America. Junior second baseman Travis Bazzana was named a preseason All-American by Perfect Game.

== Regular season ==
In a May 5 win over Washington State Travis Bazzana belted his 22nd home run, breaking the single season home run record previously set by Jim Wilson in 1982. Bazzana hit three home runs in the game, the final of which gave the Beavers their 90th of the season, breaking the single-season team record of 89 set by the 2023 squad. The game also saw Bazzana become the first Beaver to cross 200 career runs scored.

Bazzana continued his assault on the Oregon State record books in the series opener against UCLA by stealing the 63rd base of his career, overtaking Todd Thomas as the all-time leader. In the UCLA series finale he hit a double, marking his 239th overall base hit and surpassing Darwin Barney at number one on the career hits list.

The final game of the regular season against Arizona was the winner-take-all deciding game for the Pac-12 Regular Season crown. Arizona took an early 1–0 lead in the 2nd inning but Oregon State scored two in the 3rd before Arizona tied the game 2–2 in the 6th. In the top half of the 9th inning Oregon State scored the go-ahead run to put the Beavers up 3–2, but in the bottom half of the 9th Arizona slapped a two-run RBI to win the game and the regular season Pac-12 championship.

Accolades
Travis Bazzana garnered national Player of the Week honors by Perfect Game/Rawlings following an opening weekend where he hit three home runs and tallied six runs batted in, leading the Beavers to a perfect 4–0 record. Bazzana earned Perfect Game's national Player of the Week honors again on March 26 following a victory over Portland and a three-game sweep of Washington, where he led off all four games with a home run, totaled six home runs and drove in 11 runs. Following a "monster month of March, hitting .475 (29-for-61) in 16 games with 27 runs scored, four doubles, one triple, 10 homers and 26 RBI," Bazzana was named the Dick Howser Trophy National Hitter of the Month by the National Collegiate Baseball Writers Association.

Aiden May was named the National Pitcher of the Week by D1Baseball.com, Perfect Game, and NCBWA after a career high 14 strikeout performance on April 26 against rival Oregon. May allowed only one hit and one walk in his eight innings of work.

Five different Oregon State players received Pac-12 Player/Pitcher of the Week recognition: Travis Bazzana (three times), Jacob Kmatz (three times), Mason Guerra, Gavin Turley, and Aiden May.

== Postseason ==
Pac-12 Tournament
Oregon State earned the No. 2 seed in the final Pac-12 baseball tournament, where they were placed in Pool B with Arizona State and Stanford. Stanford won the first game against Arizona State 8–7 and then beat Oregon State 2–1 in the second game, winning Pool B. This meant that in order to get the wild card berth into the semifinal round Oregon State had to beat Arizona State the following day and hope for Arizona to win Pool A. Oregon State beat Arizona State 3–2 but Arizona lost to California 7–5, which gave Arizona the wildcard spot and ended the Beavers' Pac-12 tournament.

NCAA tournament
Oregon State entered the NCAA tournament as the No. 15 overall seed and hosted a Regional for the 12th time in school history (10th since 2005), sweeping the series in three straight games. They then faced Kentucky in the Super Regional, losing in two straight, marking an end to their long-time run as members of the Pac-12.

== Roster ==
2024 Oregon State Beavers baseball team
Players
Coaches

| # | Pos. | Name | B/T | Height | Weight | Year | Home town |
|---|---|---|---|---|---|---|---|
| 1 | OF | Gavin Turley | R/R | 6 ft 1 in (1.85 m) | 185 lb (84 kg) | So | Chandler, AZ |
| 2 | INF | Jabin Trosky | S/R | 5 ft 11 in (1.8 m) | 186 lb (84 kg) | RS So | Carmel, CA |
| 3 | INF | Elijah Hainline | R/R | 5 ft 10 in (1.78 m) | 181 lb (82 kg) | Jr | Spokane, WA |
| 4 | INF | Dallas Macias | L/R | 5 ft 11 in (1.8 m) | 196 lb (89 kg) | So | Parker, CO |
| 6 | C | Easton Talt | L/R | 5 ft 10 in (1.78 m) | 181 lb (82 kg) | So | Everett, WA |
| 7 | INF | Brandon Forrester | R/R | 5 ft 9 in (1.75 m) | 171 lb (78 kg) | RS Fr | Sacramento, CA |
| 8 | C | Tanner Smith | R/R | 6 ft 0 in (1.83 m) | 204 lb (93 kg) | Jr | Chandler, AZ |
| 9 | INF | Mason Guerra | R/R | 6 ft 3 in (1.91 m) | 208 lb (94 kg) | Jr | Beaverton, OR |
| 12 | OF | Micah McDowell | L/R | 6 ft 1 in (1.85 m) | 195 lb (88 kg) | Sr | Halifax, Nova Scotia |
| 13 | INF | Levi Jones | L/R | 6 ft 2 in (1.88 m) | 186 lb (84 kg) | Fr | Portland, OR |
| 14 | C | Evan Gustafson | R/R | 6 ft 2 in (1.88 m) | 215 lb (98 kg) | Fr | Eau Claire, WI |
| 15 | OF | Carson McEntire | R/R | 6 ft 2 in (1.88 m) | 196 lb (89 kg) | Fr | Peoria, AZ |
| 16 | RHP | Aiden Jimenez (injured) | R/R | 6 ft 3 in (1.91 m) | 225 lb (102 kg) | So | Elk Grove, CA |
| 17 | OF | Brady Kasper | L/R | 6 ft 1 in (1.85 m) | 200 lb (91 kg) | Sr | Mission Viejo, CA |
| 18 | C | Wilson Weber | R/R | 6 ft 1 in (1.85 m) | 216 lb (98 kg) | Jr | Gresham, OR |
| 19 | RHP | AJ Lattery | R/R | 6 ft 5 in (1.96 m) | 248 lb (112 kg) | Sr | Prior Lake, MN |
| 20 | RHP | Kellan Oakes | R/R | 6 ft 3 in (1.91 m) | 197 lb (89 kg) | So | Canby, OR |
| 21 | INF | Reeve Boyd | R/R | 6 ft 1 in (1.85 m) | 190 lb (86 kg) | Fr | Seattle, WA |
| 22 | INF | Jacob Krieg | R/R | 6 ft 5 in (1.96 m) | 240 lb (109 kg) | So | Antioch, CA |
| 23 | OF | Canon Reeder | R/R | 6 ft 0 in (1.83 m) | 185 lb (84 kg) | So | Bend, OR |
| 24 | RHP | Aiden May | R/R | 6 ft 2 in (1.88 m) | 196 lb (89 kg) | Jr | Albuquerque, NM |
| 25 | RHP | Joey Mundt | R/R | 6 ft 5 in (1.96 m) | 217 lb (98 kg) | RS Sr | Hughson, CA |
| 26 | RHP | Noah Ferguson | R/R | 5 ft 9 in (1.75 m) | 191 lb (87 kg) | RS Jr | Salem, OR |
| 27 | RHP | Drew Talavs | R/R | 6 ft 3 in (1.91 m) | 197 lb (89 kg) | Fr | West Linn, OR |
| 28 | INF | Dawson Santana | R/R | 5 ft 6 in (1.68 m) | 155 lb (70 kg) | Fr | Lake Oswego, OR |
| 29 | RHP | Bryce Johnson | R/R | 6 ft 2 in (1.88 m) | 217 lb (98 kg) | Fr | Sammamish, WA |
| 30 | RHP | Kyle Scott | R/R | 6 ft 3 in (1.91 m) | 212 lb (96 kg) | Sr | Seal Beach, CA |
| 31 | RHP | Matthew Morrell | R/R | 6 ft 4 in (1.93 m) | 202 lb (92 kg) | Fr | Placentia, CA |
| 32 | RHP | AJ Hutcheson | L/R | 5 ft 11 in (1.8 m) | 190 lb (86 kg) | So | Elk Grove, CA |
| 33 | RHP | Laif Palmer | R/R | 6 ft 6 in (1.98 m) | 207 lb (94 kg) | Fr | Golden, CO |
| 34 | RHP | Ian Lawson | R/R | 6 ft 7 in (2.01 m) | 246 lb (112 kg) | Sr | Hillsboro, OR |
| 35 | RHP | Jacob Kmatz | R/R | 6 ft 3 in (1.91 m) | 210 lb (95 kg) | Jr | Albuquerque, NM |
| 36 | LHP | Nelson Keljo | L/L | 6 ft 4 in (1.93 m) | 232 lb (105 kg) | So | Portland, OR |
| 37 | INF | Travis Bazzana | L/R | 6 ft 0 in (1.83 m) | 199 lb (90 kg) | Jr | Sydney, Australia |
| 38 | RHP | Eric Segura | R/R | 6 ft 2 in (1.88 m) | 193 lb (88 kg) | Fr | Soledad, CA |
| 40 | RHP | Jaren Hunter | R/R | 6 ft 2 in (1.88 m) | 230 lb (104 kg) | Sr | Damascus, OR |
| 41 | RHP | Chase Reynolds | R/R | 6 ft 1 in (1.85 m) | 215 lb (98 kg) | Jr | Albany, OR |
| 44 | INF | Trent Caraway | R/R | 6 ft 2 in (1.88 m) | 202 lb (92 kg) | Fr | Dana Point, CA |
| 45 | RHP | James DeCremer | R/R | 6 ft 2 in (1.88 m) | 210 lb (95 kg) | Fr | Scottsdale, AZ |
| 47 | C | Anthony Marnell IV | S/R | 6 ft 2 in (1.88 m) | 198 lb (90 kg) | Fr | Las Vegas, NV |
| 48 | LHP | Tyler Mejia | L/L | 6 ft 3 in (1.91 m) | 200 lb (91 kg) | So | Castle Rock, CO |
| 50 | RHP | Bridger Holmes | R/R | 6 ft 4 in (1.93 m) | 212 lb (96 kg) | Jr | North Bend, OR |
| 51 | RHP | Tephen Montgomery | R/R | 6 ft 4 in (1.93 m) | 193 lb (88 kg) | So | Tampa, FL |
| 54 | INF | Tyce Peterson | R/R | 5 ft 10 in (1.78 m) | 194 lb (88 kg) | So | Kirkland, WA |

Head coach

Mitch Canham

Assistant coach(es)

Ryan Gipson
Joey Wong

Pitching coach(es)

Rich Dorman

Legend

- (C) Team captain
- (S) Suspended
- (I) Ineligible
- Injured
- Current redshirt

Roster
Last update: May 31, 2024

== Schedule and results ==
2024 Oregon State Beavers baseball game log
Regular season
February (8–1)

| Date | Opponent | Rank | Site/stadium | Score | Win | Loss | Save | Overall record | Pac12 record |
|---|---|---|---|---|---|---|---|---|---|
| Feb 16 | vs. New Mexico* | No. 7 | Surprise Stadium • Surprise, AZ | 15–6 | **May (1–0)** | Jackson (0–1) | None | 1–0 | |
| Feb 17 | vs. Minnesota* | No. 7 | Surprise Stadium • Surprise, AZ | 6–4 | **Reynolds (1–0)** | Tucker (0–1) | **Scott (1)** | 2–0 | |
| Feb 18 | vs. CSU Bakersfield* | No. 7 | Surprise Stadium • Surprise, AZ | 15–2 | **Holmes (1–0)** | Plotkin (0–1) | None | 3–0 | |
| Feb 19 | vs. Minnesota* | No. 7 | Surprise Stadium • Surprise, AZ | 6–1 | **Oakes (1–0)** | Gross (1–1) | None | 4–0 | |
| Feb 21 | vs. No. 19 Texas Tech* | No. 7 | Globe Life Field • Arlington, TX | 10–4 | **Lawson (1–0)** | Rogers (0–1) | None | 5–0 | |
| Feb 23 | vs. No. 2 Arkansas* | No. 7 | Globe Life Field • Arlington, TX | 4–5 | Wood (1–0) | **Hutcheson (0–1)** | Faherty (1) | 5–1 | |
| Feb 24 | vs. Michigan* | No. 7 | Globe Life Field • Arlington, TX | 11–1^{7} | **Kmatz (1–0)** | Denner (1–1) | None | 6–1 | |
| Feb 25 | vs. Oklahoma State* | No. 7 | Globe Life Field • Arlington, TX | 8–1 | **Segura (1–0)** | Keisel (0–1) | None | 7–1 | |
| Feb 29 | vs. North Dakota State* | No. 6 | Goss Stadium at Coleman Field • Corvallis, OR | 19–7^{7} | **Hutcheson (1–1)** | Ligtenberg (0–1) | None | 8–1 | |

March (13–3)

| Date | Opponent | Rank | Site/stadium | Score | Win | Loss | Save | Overall record | Pac12 record |
|---|---|---|---|---|---|---|---|---|---|
| Mar 1 | vs. North Dakota State* | No. 6 | Goss Stadium at Coleman Field • Corvallis, OR | 6–5 | **Holmes (2–0)** | Danielson (0–2) | None | 9–1 | |
| Mar 2 | vs. North Dakota State* | No. 6 | Goss Stadium at Coleman Field • Corvallis, OR | 10–0^{8} | **Kmatz (2–0)** | Knight (0–2) | None | 10–1 | |
| Mar 3 | vs. North Dakota State* | No. 6 | Goss Stadium at Coleman Field • Corvallis, OR | 13–7 | **Segura (2–0)** | Koenig (0–2) | None | 11–1 | |
| Mar 7 | vs. CSUN* | No. 6 | Goss Stadium at Coleman Field • Corvallis, OR | 9–2 | **Morrell (1–0)** | Ignaciak (0–1) | None | 12–1 | |
| Mar 8 | vs. CSUN* | No. 6 | Goss Stadium at Coleman Field • Corvallis, OR | 8–6 | **Lawson (2–0)** | Pallares (0–1) | **Holmes (1)** | 13–1 | |
| Mar 9 | vs. CSUN* | No. 6 | Goss Stadium at Coleman Field • Corvallis, OR | 7–6 | **Mejia (1–0)** | Romero (4–1) | **Morrell (1)** | 14–1 | |
| Mar 10 | vs. CSUN* | No. 6 | Goss Stadium at Coleman Field • Corvallis, OR | 9–7 | **Segura (3–0)** | Gutierrez (0–1) | **Holmes (2)** | 15–1 | |
| Mar 15 | at Utah | No. 3 | Smith's Ballpark • Salt Lake City, UT | 7–5 | **Montgomery (1–0)** | Ashman (0–1) | **Holmes (3)** | 16–1 | 1–0 |
| Mar 16 | at Utah | No. 3 | Smith's Ballpark • Salt Lake City, UT | 8–1 | **Oakes (2–0)** | McAnelly (2–2) | None | 17–1 | 2–0 |
| Mar 17 | at Utah | No. 3 | Smith's Ballpark • Salt Lake City, UT | 11–14 | Hostert (3–1) | **Hutcheson (1–2)** | Ashman (5) | 17–2 | 2–1 |
| Mar 19 | at Portland* | No. 2 | Joe Etzel Field • Portland, OR | 14–3 | **Mundt (1–0)** | Codron (1–1) | None | 18–2 | 2–1 |
| Mar 22 | vs. Washington | No. 2 | Goss Stadium at Coleman Field • Corvallis, OR | 3–1 | **Oakes (3–0)** | Engman (0–4) | **Holmes (4)** | 19–2 | 3–1 |
| Mar 23 | vs. Washington | No. 2 | Goss Stadium at Coleman Field • Corvallis, OR | 18–2 | **Kmatz (3–0)** | Kirchoff (1–1) | **Hunter (1)** | 20–2 | 4–1 |
| Mar 24 | vs. Washington | No. 2 | Goss Stadium at Coleman Field • Corvallis, OR | 10–0 | **Segura (4–0)** | Dessart (1–2) | None | 21–2 | 5–1 |
| Mar 28 | at USC | No. 2 | Cicerone Field • Irvine, CA | 1–2 | Blum (2–0) | **Oakes (3–1)** | None | 21–3 | 5–2 |
| Mar 29 | at USC | No. 2 | Cicerone Field • Irvine, CA | 4–17 | Johnson (2–0) | **Kmatz (3–1)** | None | 21–4 | 5–3 |
| Mar 30 | at USC | No. 2 | Cicerone Field • Irvine, CA | **RAINED OUT** | | | | | |

April (12–7)

| Date | Opponent | Rank | Site/stadium | Score | Win | Loss | Save | Overall record | Pac12 record |
|---|---|---|---|---|---|---|---|---|---|
| Apr 1 | vs. Gonzaga* | No. 5 | Goss Stadium at Coleman Field • Corvallis, OR | 14–0 | **Segura (5–0)** | Gosztola (0–2) | None | 22–4 | 5–3 |
| Apr 2 | vs. Gonzaga* | No. 5 | Goss Stadium at Coleman Field • Corvallis, OR | 13–5 | **Palmer (1–0)** | Hoffberg (0–2) | None | 23–4 | 5–3 |
| Apr 5 | vs. Arizona State | No. 5 | Goss Stadium at Coleman Field • Corvallis, OR | 13–8 | **Keljo (1–0)** | Barnes (0–1) | **Holmes (5)** | 24–4 | 6–3 |
| Apr 6 | vs. Arizona State | No. 5 | Goss Stadium at Coleman Field • Corvallis, OR | 9–1 | **Kmatz (4–1)** | Markl (2–2) | None | 25–4 | 7–3 |
| Apr 7 | vs. Arizona State | No. 5 | Goss Stadium at Coleman Field • Corvallis, OR | 9–7 | **Hutcheson (2–2)** | Schiefer (0–2) | **Holmes (6)** | 26–4 | 8–3 |
| Apr 9 | vs. Portland* | No. 5 | Goss Stadium at Coleman Field • Corvallis, OR | 11–8 | **Ferguson (1–0)** | Folkins (1–1) | **Holmes (7)** | 27–4 | 8–3 |
| Apr 12 | vs. Stanford | No. 5 | Goss Stadium at Coleman Field • Corvallis, OR | 6–0 | **May (2–0)** | Scott (2–6) | None | 28–4 | 9–3 |
| Apr 13 | vs. Stanford | No. 5 | Goss Stadium at Coleman Field • Corvallis, OR | 3–1 | **Kmatz (5–1)** | Lim (3–3) | **Holmes (8)** | 29–4 | 10–3 |
| Apr 14 | vs. Stanford | No. 5 | Goss Stadium at Coleman Field • Corvallis, OR | 10–11 | Reimers (3–1) | **Palmer (1–1)** | Volchko (1) | 29–5 | 10–4 |
| Apr 16 | at Nevada* | No. 5 | William Peccole Park • Reno, NV | 12–5 | **Mejia (2–0)** | Marks (2–3) | None | 30–5 | 10–4 |
| Apr 17 | at Nevada* | No. 5 | William Peccole Park • Reno, NV | 10–11 | Canizares (1–0) | **Holmes (2–1)** | None | 30–6 | 10–4 |
| Apr 19 | at California | No. 5 | Evans Diamond • Berkeley, CA | 8–10 | Stasiowski (3–1) | **Holmes (2–2)** | None | 30–7 | 10–5 |
| Apr 20 | at California | No. 5 | Evans Diamond • Berkeley, CA | 7–8 | Aivazian (2–0) | **Holmes (2–3)** | None | 30–8 | 10–6 |
| Apr 21 | at California | No. 5 | Evans Diamond • Berkeley, CA | 3–4 | Newmann (2–4) | **Palmer (1–2)** | None | 30–9 | 10–7 |
| Apr 23 | vs. Portland* | No. 9 | Ron Tonkin Field • Hillsboro, OR | 7–2 | **Hunter (1–0)** | Gillis (0–2) | None | 31–9 | 10–7 |
| Apr 26 | vs. No. 22 Oregon | No. 9 | Goss Stadium at Coleman Field • Corvallis, OR | 2–0 | **May (3–0)** | Gordon (5–4) | **Holmes (9)** | 32–9 | 11–7 |
| Apr 27 | vs. No. 22 Oregon | No. 9 | Goss Stadium at Coleman Field • Corvallis, OR | 4–2 | **Mundt (2–0)** | Mercado (0–1) | **Holmes (10)** | 33–9 | 12–7 |
| Apr 28 | vs. No. 22 Oregon | No. 9 | Goss Stadium at Coleman Field • Corvallis, OR | 1–7 | Setter (5–3) | **Segura (5–1)** | None | 33–10 | 12–8 |
| Apr 30 | at Oregon* | No. 6 | PK Park • Eugene, OR | 5–9 | Moore (2–0) | **Hunter (1–1)** | None | 33–11 | 12–8 |

May (8–2)

| Date | Opponent | Rank | Site/stadium | Score | Win | Loss | Save | Overall record | Pac12 record |
|---|---|---|---|---|---|---|---|---|---|
| May 3 | at Washington State | No. 6 | Bailey-Brayton Field • Pullman, WA | 2–1 | **May (4–0)** | Taylor (4–3) | **Holmes (11)** | 34–11 | 13–8 |
| May 4 | at Washington State | No. 6 | Bailey-Brayton Field • Pullman, WA | 9–10 | Wilford (4–6) | **Kmatz (5–2)** | Wickersham (1) | 34–12 | 13–9 |
| May 5 | at Washington State | No. 6 | Bailey-Brayton Field • Pullman, WA | 10–6 | **Keljo (2–0)** | Brotherton (5–6) | None | 35–12 | 14–9 |
| May 6 | at Gonzaga* | No. 7 | Patterson Baseball Complex • Spokane, WA | 20–13 | **Hutcheson (3–2)** | Mueller (2–2) | None | 36–12 | 14–9 |
| May 10 | vs. UCLA | No. 7 | Goss Stadium at Coleman Field • Corvallis, OR | 11–0 | **May (5–0)** | Jewett (1–5) | **Lawson (1)** | 37–12 | 15–9 |
| May 11 | vs. UCLA | No. 7 | Goss Stadium at Coleman Field • Corvallis, OR | 12–11 | **Holmes (3–3)** | Ruff (2–6) | None | 38–12 | 16–9 |
| May 12 | vs. UCLA | No. 7 | Goss Stadium at Coleman Field • Corvallis, OR | 15–1^{7} | **Segura (6–1)** | Rodriguez (2–5) | None | 39–12 | 17–9 |
| May 16 | at No. 14 Arizona | No. 6 | Hi Corbett Field • Tucson, AZ | 9–2 | **May (6–0)** | Kent (3–3) | None | 40–12 | 18–9 |
| May 17 | at No. 14 Arizona | No. 6 | Hi Corbett Field • Tucson, AZ | 16–1 | **Kmatz (6–2)** | Candiotti (6–3) | None | 41–12 | 19–9 |
| May 18 | at No. 14 Arizona | No. 6 | Hi Corbett Field • Tucson, AZ | 3–4 | Susac (1–2) | **Holmes (4–3)** | None | 41–13 | 19–10 |

Postseason
Pac-12 tournament (1–1)

| Date | Opponent | Rank | Site/stadium | Score | Win | Loss | Save | Overall record | Pac-12 tournament record |
|---|---|---|---|---|---|---|---|---|---|
| May 22 | vs. (8) Stanford | No. 6 (2) | Scottsdale Stadium • Scottsdale, AZ | 1–2 | Volchko (2–1) | **Hunter (1–2)** | O'Harran (7) | 41–14 | 0–1 |
| May 23 | vs. (5) Arizona State | No. 6 (2) | Scottsdale Stadium • Scottsdale, AZ | 3–2 | **Keljo (4–0)** | Jacobs (7–3) | **Holmes (12)** | 42–14 | 1–1 |

Corvallis Regional (3–0)

| Date | Opponent | Rank | Site/stadium | Score | Win | Loss | Save | Overall record | Regional record |
|---|---|---|---|---|---|---|---|---|---|
| May 31 | vs. (4) Tulane | No. 7 (1) | Goss Stadium at Coleman Field • Corvallis, OR | 10–4 | **May (7–0)** | Welch (7–4) | None | 43–14 | 1–0 |
| Jun 1 | vs. No. 21 (2) UC Irvine | No. 7 (1) | Goss Stadium at Coleman Field • Corvallis, OR | 5–3 | **Kmatz (7–2)** | Hansen (6–4) | **Holmes (13)** | 44–14 | 2–0 |
| Jun 2 | vs. No. 21 (2) UC Irvine | No. 7 (1) | Goss Stadium at Coleman Field • Corvallis, OR | 11–6 | **Hutcheson (4–2)** | Utagawa (3–1) | None | 45–14 | 3–0 |

Lexington Super Regional (0–2)

| Date | Opponent | Rank | Site/stadium | Score | Win | Loss | Save | Overall record | Super Regional record |
|---|---|---|---|---|---|---|---|---|---|
| Jun 8 | at No. 2 Kentucky | No. 7 | Kentucky Proud Park • Lexington, KY | 0–10 | Pooser (7–1) | **May (7–1)** | None | 45–15 | 0–1 |
| Jun 9 | at No. 2 Kentucky | No. 7 | Kentucky Proud Park • Lexington, KY | 2–3 | O'Brien (3–0) | **Kmatz (7–3)** | Hummel (7) | 45–16 | 0–2 |

- Win
- Loss
- Postponement/Tie
- Bold: Oregon State team member
- Rankings from D1 Baseball
- (#) Tournament seedings in parentheses.
- * indicates a non-conference game.

== Corvallis Regional ==
Corvallis Regional Teams
| No. 15 (1) Oregon State Beavers | (2) UC Irvine Anteaters | (3) Nicholls Colonels | (4) Tulane Green Wave |

- ◆ Ranking based on NCAA tournament seeding

First Round
1 | Oregon State | 10
4 | Tulane | 4
2 | UC Irvine | 13
3 | Nicholls | 12
Lower round 1
3 | Nicholls | 0
4 | Tulane | 3

Semi-Finals
1 | Oregon State | 5
2 | UC Irvine | 3
Lower final
2 | UC Irvine | 17
4 | Tulane | 7

Finals
1 | Oregon State | 11
2 | UC Irvine | 6

== Lexington Super Regional ==
Lexington Super Regional Teams
| No. 2 Kentucky Wildcats | No. 15 Oregon State Beavers |

| Championship Series |
| Kentucky | 10 | 3 |
| Oregon State | 0 | 2 |

== Rankings ==
Ranking movements Legend: ██ Increase in ranking ██ Decrease in ranking
| | Week | | | | | | | | | | | | | | | | |
| Poll | Pre | 1 | 2 | 3 | 4 | 5 | 6 | 7 | 8 | 9 | 10 | 11 | 12 | 13 | 14 | 15 | Final |
|---|---|---|---|---|---|---|---|---|---|---|---|---|---|---|---|---|---|
| Coaches' | 7 | 7* | 6 | 5 | 3 | 2 | 2 | 5 | 5 | 4 | 10 | 7 | 8 | 6 | 7 | 7 | 11 |
| Baseball America | 5 | 4 | 4 | 4 | 4 | 4 | 3 | 9 | 8 | 8 | 13 | 11 | 11 | 8 | 6 | 6 | 9 |
| NCBWA† | 8 | 4 | 4 | 5 | 1 | 2 | 2 | 5 | 5 | 5 | 11 | 7 | 9 | 6 | 7 | 8 | 10 |
| D1Baseball | 7 | 7 | 6 | 6 | 3 | 2 | 2 | 5 | 5 | 5 | 9 | 6 | 7 | 6 | 6 | 7 | 10 |
| Perfect Game | 9 | 8 | 7 | 6 | 4 | 2 | 3 | 4 | 4 | 4 | 11 | 7 | 8 | 4 | 4 | 4 | 12 |

† NCBWA ranks 30 teams in their preseason poll, but only ranks 25 teams weekly during the season.
* A new poll was not released for this week, so for comparison purposes, the previous week's ranking is inserted in this week's slot.

== Awards ==
| Pac-12 Player of the Year & Batting Champion: Travis Bazzana |
| Pac-12 All-Conference Team: Travis Bazzana; Bridger Holmes; Jacob Kmatz; Aiden May; Gavin Turley; Mason Guerra (Honorable Mention); Elijah Hainline (Honorable Mention); Dallas Macias (Honorable Mention); Joey Mundt (Honorable Mention); Eric Segura (Honorable Mention) |
| Pac-12 All-Defensive Team: Jacob Kmatz |

== Major League Baseball draft ==
Travis Bazzana was selected as the No. 1 overall pick in the 2024 Major League Baseball draft, becoming the first Australian player ever taken in the first round, first second-baseman selected No. 1, and the first overall No. 1 pick by the Cleveland Guardians. This is the second time Oregon State has had a player chosen No. 1 overall after Adley Rutschman in the 2019 MLB draft, placing Oregon State in elite company as one of only four schools to produce multiple No. 1 picks.

2024 MLB Draft results
| Player | Position | Round | Overall | MLB team |
|---|---|---|---|---|
| Travis Bazzana | 2B | 1st | 1st | Cleveland Guardians |
| Aiden May | RHP | 2nd | 70th | Miami Marlins |
| Jacob Kmatz | RHP | 5th | 157th | Tampa Bay Rays |
| Bridger Holmes | RHP | 7th | 202nd | California Angels |
| Elijah Hainline | SS | 7th | 220th | Los Angeles Dodgers |
| Mason Guerra | INF | 14th | 431st | Atlanta Braves |
| Micah McDowell | OF | 17th | 514th | Miami Marlins |
