= 2013 Oregon State Beavers baseball team =

American college baseball season

2013 Oregon State Beavers baseball

Pac-12 champions Corvallis Regional champions Corvallis Super Regional champions

College World Series, 2–2
- Conference: Pac-12 Conference
- Record: 52–13 (24–6 Pac-12)
- Head coach: Pat Casey (19th season)
- Assistant coaches: Marty Lees (12th season); Pat Bailey (6th season)
- Pitching coach: Nate Yeskie (5th season)
- Home stadium: Goss Stadium at Coleman Field

2013 Pac-12 Conference baseball standings
	Conf.						Overall
Team	W		L		T	PCT	W		L		T	PCT
No. 4 Oregon State ‍†‍‍^{y}	24	–	6	–	0	.800	52	–	12	–	0	.813
No. 17 Oregon ‍‍‍^{y}	22	–	8	–	0	.733	48	–	16	–	0	.750
No. 1 UCLA ‍‍‍^{y}	21	–	9	–	0	.700	46	–	17	–	0	.730
No. 19 Arizona State ‍‍‍^{y}	16	–	14	–	0	.533	37	–	22	–	1	.625
Stanford ‍‍‍	16	–	14	–	0	.533	32	–	22	–	0	.593
Arizona ‍‍‍	15	–	15	–	0	.500	34	–	21	–	0	.618
Washington ‍‍‍	15	–	15	–	0	.500	24	–	32	–	0	.429
California ‍‍‍	10	–	20	–	0	.333	23	–	31	–	0	.426
Southern California ‍‍‍	10	–	20	–	0	.333	20	–	36	–	0	.357
Washington State ‍‍‍	9	–	21	–	0	.300	23	–	32	–	0	.418
Utah ‍‍‍	7	–	23	–	0	.233	21	–	31	–	0	.404
† – Conference champion y – Invited to the NCAA tournament As of June 22, 2013; Rankings from Collegiate Baseball

The 2013 Oregon State Beavers baseball team represented Oregon State University in the 2013 NCAA Division I baseball season. The Beavers played their home games at Goss Stadium at Coleman Field and were members of the Pac-12 Conference. The team was coached by Pat Casey in his 19th season at Oregon State. The Beavers won the Pac-12 conference with a 24–6 conference record, and made it to the semifinals of the College World Series in Omaha, Nebraska, officially finishing tied for 3rd in the tournament.

== Roster ==
2013 Oregon State Beavers roster
Pitchers: 11 Fry, Jace - Sophomore; 18 Jackson, Brandon - Junior; 19 Engelbrekt, Max - Freshman; 22 Brocker, Cole - Senior; 23 Moore, Andrew - Freshman; 24 Schultz, Scott - Junior; 25 Painton, Tyler - RS Sophomore; 26 Starr, Taylor - RS Senior; 28 Wetzler, Ben - Junior; 29 Bauer, Clay - Junior; 31 Boyd, Matt - Senior; 36 Bryant, Tony - Senior; 37 Rodriguez, Carlos - Sophomore; 38 Reser, Zack - RS Sophomore; 41 Child, Dan - Junior	Catchers: 6 Esposito, Nate - Sophomore; 13 Rodriguez, Jake - Junior; 50 Day, Beau - Junior; Infielders: 1 Smith, Tyler - Senior; 3 Keyes, Kavin - Junior; 7 Martinez, Paul - Freshman; 9 Hayes, Danny - Senior; 14 Peterson, Andy - Junior; 15 Casper, Jerad - Junior; 16 Clark, Gabe - Freshman	Outfielders: 4 Gordon, Max - Senior; 8 Conforto, Michael - Sophomore; 10 Davis, Dylan - Sophomore; 12 Rulli, Nick - Junior; 17 Jansen, Joey - Sophomore; 20 Yanzick, Zane - RS Sophomore; 30 Howell, Ryan - Sophomore; 33 Barnes, Ryan - Senior; 35 Matthews, Joey - Senior; 40 Hendrix, Jeff - Freshman

== Coaches ==
2013 Oregon State Beavers baseball coaching staff
- 5 Pat Casey - Head coach - 19th year
- 27 Pat Bailey - Assistant coach - 6th year
- 2 Andy Jenkins - Assistant coach - 1st year
- 21 Nate Yeskie - Assistant coach - 5th year

== Schedule ==
2005 Oregon State Beavers baseball game log (52–13)
Regular season (45–10)
February (8–0)

#	Date	Opponent	Rank	Site/stadium	Score	Overall record	Pac-10 record
1	Feb 15	vs. Utah Valley	No. 10	Palm Springs Stadium • Palm Springs, CA	W 5–2	1–0	–
2	Feb 16	vs. Gonzaga	No. 10	Palm Springs Stadium • Palm Springs, CA	W 9–2	2–0	–
3	Feb 17	vs. UC Riverside	No. 10	Palm Springs Stadium • Palm Springs, CA	W 14–3 (7)	3–0	–
4	Feb 18	vs. UC Riverside	No. 9	Palm Springs Stadium • Palm Springs, CA	W 5–4 (11)	4–0	–
5	Feb 21	at No. 22 San Diego State	No. 9	Tony Gwynn Stadium • San Diego, CA	W 8–1	5–0	–
6	Feb 22	at No. 22 San Diego State	No. 9	Tony Gwynn Stadium • San Diego, CA	W 2–0	6–0	–
7	Feb 23	at No. 22 San Diego State	No. 9	Tony Gwynn Stadium • San Diego, CA	W 5–0	7–0	–
8	Feb 24	at No. 22 San Diego State	No. 9	Tony Gwynn Stadium • San Diego, CA	W 7–1	8–0	–

March (14–4)

#	Date	Opponent	Rank	Site/stadium	Score	Overall record	Pac-10 record
9	Mar 1	Bryant	No. 5	Goss Stadium • Corvallis, OR	W 2–1 (10)	9–0	–
10	Mar 2	Bryant	No. 5	Goss Stadium • Corvallis, OR	W 7–2	10–0	–
11	Mar 2	Bryant	No. 5	Goss Stadium • Corvallis, OR	W 3–1	11–0	–
12	Mar 3	Bryant	No. 5	Goss Stadium • Corvallis, OR	W 14–0	12–0	–
	Mar 5	at Portland	No. 3	Joe Etzel Field • Portland, OR	Postponed to April 17		
13	Mar 8	Texas State	No. 3	Goss Stadium • Corvallis, OR	W 16–4	13–0	–
14	Mar 9	Texas State	No. 3	Goss Stadium • Corvallis, OR	W 6–3	14–0	–
15	Mar 10	Texas State	No. 3	Goss Stadium • Corvallis, OR	W 6–4	15–0	–
16	Mar 12	San Francisco	No. 2	Goss Stadium • Corvallis, OR	L 1–5	15–1	–
17	Mar 13	San Francisco	No. 2	Goss Stadium • Corvallis, OR	W 6–5	16–1	–
18	Mar 15	at No. 24 Arizona	No. 2	Hi Corbett Field • Tucson, AZ	W 6–2	17–1	1–0
19	Mar 16	at No. 24 Arizona	No. 2	Hi Corbett Field • Tucson, AZ	W 4–3	18–1	2–0
20	Mar 17	at No. 24 Arizona	No. 2	Hi Corbett Field • Tucson, AZ	W 8–4	19–1	3–0
21	Mar 22	No. 22 Arizona State	No. 2	Goss Stadium • Corvallis, OR	W 5–0	20–1	4–0
22	Mar 23	No. 22 Arizona State	No. 2	Goss Stadium • Corvallis, OR	L 0–4 (Note: Arizona State's Ryan Kellogg threw a no-hitter)	20–2	4–1
23	Mar 24	No. 22 Arizona State	No. 2	Goss Stadium • Corvallis, OR	W 4–3	21–2	5–1
24	Mar 28	at San Diego	No. 2	Fowler Park • San Diego, CA	L 4–7	21–3	–
25	Mar 29	at San Diego	No. 2	Fowler Park • San Diego, CA	W 14–5	22–3	–
26	Mar 30	at San Diego	No. 2	Fowler Park • San Diego, CA	L 3–13	22–4	–

April (12–4)

#	Date	Opponent	Rank	Site/stadium	Score	Overall record	Pac-10 record
27	Apr 2	Portland	No. 6	Goss Stadium • Corvallis, OR	W 7–5	23–4	–
28	Apr 5	at No. 13 UCLA	No. 6	Jackie Robinson Stadium • Los Angeles, CA	L 2–3	23–5	5–2
29	Apr 6	at No. 13 UCLA	No. 6	Jackie Robinson Stadium • Los Angeles, CA	W 5–0	24–5	6–2
30	Apr 7	at No. 13 UCLA	No. 6	Jackie Robinson Stadium • Los Angeles, CA	W 5–2	25–5	7–2
31	Apr 9	No. 9 Oregon	No. 6	Goss Stadium • Corvallis, OR	L 3–6	25–6	–
32	Apr 12	Utah	No. 6	Goss Stadium • Corvallis, OR	W 1–0	26–6	8–2
33	Apr 13	Utah	No. 6	Goss Stadium • Corvallis, OR	W 8–3	27–6	9–2
34	Apr 14	Utah	No. 6	Goss Stadium • Corvallis, OR	W 4–1	28–6	10–2
35	Apr 17	at Portland	No. 5	Joe Etzel Field • Portland, OR	W 5–1	29–6	–
36	Apr 20	at Washington	No. 5	Husky Ballpark • Seattle, WA	L 1–5	29–7	10–3
37	Apr 20	at Washington	No. 5	Husky Ballpark • Seattle, WA	L 3–10	29–8	10–4
38	Apr 21	at Washington	No. 5	Husky Ballpark • Seattle, WA	W 8–0	30–8	11–4
39	Apr 22	at Seattle	No. 6	Bannerwood Park • Bellevue, WA	W 4–3 (14)	31–8	–
40	Apr 26	Southern California	No. 6	Goss Stadium • Corvallis, OR	W 10–4	32–8	12–4
41	Apr 27	Southern California	No. 6	Goss Stadium • Corvallis, OR	W 3–0	33–8	13–4
42	Apr 28	Southern California	No. 6	Goss Stadium • Corvallis, OR	W 6–1	34–8	14–4

May (11–2)

#	Date	Opponent	Rank	Site/stadium	Score	Overall record	Pac-10 record
43	May 3	California	No. 5	Goss Stadium • Corvallis, OR	W 6–1	35–8	15–4
44	May 4	California	No. 5	Goss Stadium • Corvallis, OR	W 5–0	36–8	16–4
45	May 5	California	No. 5	Goss Stadium • Corvallis, OR	W 6–4	37–8	17–4
46	May 8	vs. Portland	No. 5	Volcanoes Stadium • Keizer, OR	W 4–3	38–8	–
47	May 10	at No. 19 Stanford	No. 5	Klein Field at Sunken Diamond • Stanford, CA	W 7–3	39–8	18–4
48	May 11	at No. 19 Stanford	No. 5	Klein Field at Sunken Diamond • Stanford, CA	W 10–4	40–8	19–4
49	May 12	at No. 19 Stanford	No. 5	Klein Field at Sunken Diamond • Stanford, CA	W 5–4	41–8	20–4
50	May 17	at No. 6 Oregon	No. 4	PK Park • Eugene, OR	L 0–3	41–9	20–5
51	May 18	at No. 6 Oregon	No. 4	PK Park • Eugene, OR	W 9–0	42–9	21–5
52	May 19	at No. 6 Oregon	No. 4	PK Park • Eugene, OR	W 12–2	43–9	22–5
	May 21	No. 7 Oregon	No. 4	Goss Stadium • Corvallis, OR	Cancelled		
53	May 24	Washington State	No. 4	Goss Stadium • Corvallis, OR	L 9–10 (11)	43–10	22–6
54	May 25	Washington State	No. 4	Goss Stadium • Corvallis, OR	W 4–0	44–10	23–6
55	May 26	Washington State	No. 4	Goss Stadium • Corvallis, OR	W 7–6	45–10	24–6

Postseason (7–3)
NCAA tournament: Corvallis Regional (3–0)

#	Date	Opponent	Seed/Rank	Site/stadium	Score	Overall record	NCAAT record
56	May 31	(4) UTSA	(1) No. 5	Goss Stadium • Corvallis, OR	W 5–4	46–10	1–0
57	June 1	(3) UC Santa Barbara	(1) No. 5	Goss Stadium • Corvallis, OR	W 3–2	47–10	2–0
58	June 2	(2) Texas A&M	(1) No. 5	Goss Stadium • Corvallis, OR	W 6–1	48–10	3–0

NCAA tournament: Corvallis Super Regional (2–1)

#	Date	Opponent	Seed/Rank	Site/stadium	Score	Overall record	NCAAT record
59	June 8	No. 15 Kansas State	(3) No. 5	Goss Stadium • Corvallis, OR	L 2–6 (10)	48–11	3–1
60	June 9	No. 15 Kansas State	(3) No. 5	Goss Stadium • Corvallis, OR	W 12–4	49–11	4–1
61	June 10	No. 15 Kansas State	(3) No. 5	Goss Stadium • Corvallis, OR	W 4–3	50–11	5–1

NCAA tournament: College World Series (2–2)

#	Date	Opponent	Seed/Rank	Site/stadium	Score	Overall record	CWS record
62	June 15	vs. No. 7 Mississippi State	(3) No. 3	TD Ameritrade Park • Omaha, NE	L 4–5	50–12	0–1
63	June 17	vs. No. 4 Louisville	(3) No. 3	TD Ameritrade Park • Omaha, NE	W 11–4	51–12	1–1
64	June 19	vs. No. 8 Indiana	(3) No. 3	TD Ameritrade Park • Omaha, NE	W 1–0	52–12	2–1
65	June 21	vs. No. 7 Mississippi State	(3) No. 3	TD Ameritrade Park • Omaha, NE	L 1–4	52–13	2–2

== Ranking movements ==
Ranking movements Legend: ██ Increase in ranking ██ Decrease in ranking
	Week																		
Poll	Pre	1	2	3	4	5	6	7	8	9	10	11	12	13	14	15	16	17	Final
Coaches'	14	14*	5	4	4	4	3	6	6	5	6	5	5	4	3	5			
Baseball America	6	6	6	4	3	3	2	6	6	5	7	6	6	6	4	4			
Collegiate Baseball^	10	9	5	3	2	2	2	6	6	5	6	5	5	4	4	5			
NCBWA†	10	8	5	4	4	4	3	8	7	6	6	4	5	3	3	5			

^ Collegiate Baseball ranked 40 teams in their preseason poll, but only ranked 30 teams weekly during the season.
† NCBWA ranks 30 teams in their preseason poll, but only ranks 25 teams weekly during the season.
* A new poll was not released for this week, so for comparison purposes, the previous week's ranking is inserted in this week's slot.
