= 2012 Oregon State Beavers baseball team =

American college baseball season

2012 Oregon State Beavers baseball

Baton Rouge Regional, 2–2
- Conference: Pac-12 Conference
- Record: 40–20 (18–12 Pac-12)
- Head coach: Pat Casey (18th season)
- Assistant coaches: Marty Lees (11th season); Pat Bailey (5th season)
- Pitching coach: Nate Yeskie (4th season)
- Home stadium: Goss Stadium at Coleman Field

2012 Pac-12 Conference baseball standings
	Conf.				Overall
Team	W		L	PCT	W		L	PCT
No. 4 UCLA ‍†‍‍^{y}	20	–	10	.667	48	–	16	.750
No. 11 Arizona ‍‍‍^{y}	20	–	10	.667	48	–	17	.738
No. 10 Oregon ‍‍‍^{y}	19	–	11	.633	46	–	19	.708
No. 13 Stanford ‍‍‍^{y}	18	–	12	.600	41	–	18	.695
No. 17 Oregon State ‍‍‍^{y}	18	–	12	.600	40	–	20	.667
Arizona State ‍‍‍	18	–	12	.600	36	–	20	.643
Washington ‍‍‍	13	–	17	.433	30	–	25	.545
California ‍‍‍	12	–	18	.400	29	–	25	.537
Washington State ‍‍‍	12	–	18	.400	28	–	28	.500
USC ‍‍‍	8	–	22	.267	23	–	32	.418
Utah ‍‍‍	7	–	23	.233	14	–	42	.250
† – Conference champion y – Invited to the 2012 NCAA Division I baseball tournament As of May 28, 2012; Rankings from Coaches' Poll

The 2012 Oregon State Beavers baseball team represented Oregon State University in the 2012 NCAA Division I baseball season. The team participated in the Pac-12 Conference. They were coached by Pat Casey and assistant coaches Marty Lees, Pat Bailey, and Nate Yeskie. They played home games in Goss Stadium at Coleman Field. The Beavers finished the season with a 40–20 overall record, and came in fourth (tied with Arizona State and Stanford, just two wins behind first) in the Pac-12 Conference Championship with 18 wins and 12 losses.

The team was selected as the #2 seed to participate in the Baton Rouge Regional in the 2012 NCAA Division I baseball tournament, where they lost to #1 seed and #7 national seed Louisiana State 5–6 in the finals during extra innings.

== Previous season ==
Oregon State finished the 2011 regular season with a 41–17 overall record, and came in third in the Pac-12 Conference Championship with 17 wins and 10 losses. The team was selected to host a Regional in the 2011 NCAA Division I baseball tournament, and as such were seeded #1 in the Corvallis Regional. The Beavers won all three of their games in the Corvallis Regional and went on to play the Vanderbilt Commodores in the Nashville Super Regional, where they lost 1–11.

== Highlights ==
- On May 25, 2012 Pat Casey became the Oregon State University program's all-time winningest coach after winning against rival Oregon 7–3.
- Having participated in the Baton Rouge Regional they have now participated in the NCAA tournament a school record 4 consecutive years.
- This was their second consecutive and fifth all-time season with at least 40 wins.
- Michael Conforto, a freshman, set a new single-season RBI record of 76.

== Roster ==
2012 Oregon State Beavers baseball team
Players
Coaches

#	Pos.	Name	B/T	Height	Weight	Year	Previous school	Home town
33	C	Ryan Barnes	R/R	—	190 lb (86 kg)	Jr	West Linn	West Linn, Oregon
20	RHP	Cole Baylis	R/R	6 ft 8 in (2.03 m)	214 lb (97 kg)	So	St. Francis	Los Altos, California
31	LHP	Matt Boyd	L/L	6 ft 3 in (1.91 m)	215 lb (98 kg)	Jr	Eastside Catholic	Mercer Island, Wash.
22	RHP	Cole Brocker	R/R	6 ft 4 in (1.93 m)	215 lb (98 kg)	Jr	Kimberly/Sacramento City College	Appleton, Wisc.
36	RHP	Tony Bryant	R/R	6 ft 8 in (2.03 m)	220 lb (100 kg)	Jr	Kennewick	Kennewick, Wash
41	RHP	Dan Child	R/R	6 ft 5 in (1.96 m)	225 lb (102 kg)	So	Jesuit	Rocklin, Calif
8	C	Michael Conforto	L/R	6 ft 1 in (1.85 m)	211 lb (96 kg)	Fr	Redmond	Woodinville, Wash
10	INF	Dylan Davis	R/R	6 ft 0 in (1.83 m)	200 lb (91 kg)	Fr	Redmond	Redmond, Wash.
39	OF	Ryan Dettman	L/R	6 ft 0 in (1.83 m)	175 lb (79 kg)	Jr	Del Campo/American River College	Citrus Heights, Calif.
23	RHP	Adam Duke	R/R	6 ft 2 in (1.88 m)	185 lb (84 kg)	So	Spanish Fork	Spanish Fork, Utah
25	OF	Jordan Dunatov	R/R	6 ft 6 in (1.98 m)	196 lb (89 kg)	Fr	Horizon	Scottsdale, Ariz.
2	INF	Ryan Dunn	R/R	5 ft 11 in (1.8 m)	185 lb (84 kg)	Sr	Esperanza/Orange Coast College	Bend, Ore.
6	UTL	Nate Esposito	R/R	5 ft 11 in (1.8 m)	180 lb (82 kg)	Fr	Granite Bay	Granite Bay, Calif
18	LHP	Matt Fielding	R/L	5 ft 9 in (1.75 m)	170 lb (77 kg)	RS Fr	Rocklin	Rocklin, Calif.
11	LHP	Jace Fry	L/L	6 ft 1 in (1.85 m)	195 lb (88 kg)	Fr	Southridge	Beaverton, Ore
40	OF	Max Gordon	L/L	5 ft 8 in (1.73 m)	170 lb (77 kg)	Jr	Ashland/Sierra College	Ashland, Ore
16	C	Ryan Gorton	R/R	6 ft 2 in (1.88 m)	213 lb (97 kg)	Sr	Tigard	Tigard, Ore
9	INF	Danny Hayes	L/R	6 ft 5 in (1.96 m)	205 lb (93 kg)	Jr	Jesuit	Rancho Murieta, Calif
30	OF	Ryan Howell	R/R	6 ft 0 in (1.83 m)	190 lb (86 kg)	Fr	Heritage	Brentwood, Calif
3	INF	Kavin Keyes	S/R	5 ft 11 in (1.8 m)	185 lb (84 kg)	So	Alta	Sandy, Utah
15	OF	Spencer Manjarrez	R/R	6 ft 1 in (1.85 m)	196 lb (89 kg)	Fr	Gig Harbor	Gig Harbor, Wash
35	OF	Joey Matthews	R/R	5 ft 10 in (1.78 m)	185 lb (84 kg)	Jr	Vacaville/Sacramento City College	Vacaville, Calif
19	RHP	Michael McCall	R/R	6 ft 2 in (1.88 m)	173 lb (78 kg)	Fr	Gig Harbor	Gig Harbor, Wash
17	OF	Sam Montgomery	R/R	5 ft 11 in (1.8 m)	185 lb (84 kg)	Sr	Bellarmine/Sierra College	Fremont, Calif
38	LHP	Zack Reser	L/L	6 ft 2 in (1.88 m)	205 lb (93 kg)	RS Fr	Westview	Beaverton, Or
37	LHP	Carlos Rodriquez	L/L	6 ft 2 in (1.88 m)	198 lb (90 kg)	Fr	Iolani School	Kapolei, Hawaii
13	C	Jake Rodriquez	R/R	6 ft 1 in (1.85 m)	195 lb (88 kg)	So	Elk Grove	Elk Grove, Calif
12	OF	Nick Rulli	R/R	6 ft 1 in (1.85 m)	185 lb (84 kg)	RS So	Lake Oswego/San Joaquin Delta College	Lake Oswego, Ore
24	RHP	Scott Schultz	R/R	6 ft 3 in (1.91 m)	195 lb (88 kg)	So	Gig Harbor	Gig Harbor, Wash
1	INF	Tyler Smith	R/R	6 ft 0 in (1.83 m)	191 lb (87 kg)	Jr	Thousand Oaks	Thousand Oaks, Calif
26	RHP	Taylor Starr	R/R	6 ft 2 in (1.88 m)	210 lb (95 kg)	RS Sr	Kelso	Longview, Wash
4	INF	John Tommasini	S/R	5 ft 8 in (1.73 m)	171 lb (78 kg)	RS Sr	Roseburg	Tenmile, Ore
29	RHP	Mitchell Tripp	R/R	6 ft 1 in (1.85 m)	195 lb (88 kg)	Fr	Meridian	Bellingham, Wash
28	LHP	Ben Wetzler	L/L	6 ft 1 in (1.85 m)	200 lb (91 kg)	So	Clackamas	Clackamas, Ore
32	RHP	Riley Wilkerson	R/R	6 ft 4 in (1.93 m)	182 lb (83 kg)	Fr	West Linn	West Linn, OR

Head coach

- 5 Pat Casey
- 7 Marty Lees (Associate)

Assistant coach(es)

- 27 Pat Bailey
- 34 Ryan Gipson (Undergraduate)
- 42 Andy Jenkins (Undergraduate)
- 43 Jared Norris (Undergraduate)

Pitching coach(es)

21 Nate Yeskie

Legend

- (C) Team captain
- (S) Suspended
- (I) Ineligible
- Injured
- Current redshirt

Roster
Last update: 2012-06-07

== Rankings ==
Ranking movements Legend: ██ Increase in ranking ██ Decrease in ranking
	Week																		
Poll	Pre	1	2	3	4	5	6	7	8	9	10	11	12	13	14	15	16	17	Final
Coaches'	19	19*		28	24	16	19	19	23	21	21	20	19	20	20	17	22		
Baseball America	23	21			25	19	22	20					23	23	23	16	24		
Collegiate Baseball^	24	21	26	28	28	25	23	23		30	28		22	28	28	18	25	25	25
NCBWA†	22	20	24	22	19	16	19	17	22	20	19	21	18	20	20	17	21	22	22

^ Collegiate Baseball ranked 40 teams in their preseason poll, but only ranked 30 teams weekly during the season.
† NCBWA ranks 30 teams in their preseason poll, but only ranks 25 teams weekly during the season.
* A new poll was not released for this week, so for comparison purposes, the previous week's ranking is inserted in this week's slot.

== See also ==
- Oregon State Beavers baseball
- 2012 NCAA Division I baseball season
