= Joe Etzel =

American coach and athletic director (1938–2025)

Joseph Etzel
Biographical details
- Born: June 20, 1938; Portland, Oregon, U.S.
- Died: December 28, 2025 (aged 87); Portland, Oregon, U.S.
- Education: University of Portland

Coaching career (HC unless noted)
- 1965–1985: Portland Pilots (baseball)
- 1969–1970: Portland Pilots (interim HC)

Administrative career (AD unless noted)
- 1970–2004: Portland Pilots (athletic director)
- Spouse: Judy Kehoe (m. 1962; died 2023)
- Children: 4

Joseph Etzel (June 20, 1938 – December 28, 2025) was the athletic director of the University of Portland from 1970 to 2004, as well as the head coach of two different sports for that college.

Etzel was a native of Portland, Oregon, who attended Central Catholic High School there, graduating in 1956. He went on to be a standout athlete at the University of Portland, graduating in 1960.

In 1965, Etzel returned to the University of Portland as its head baseball coach, a position he held for 21 seasons. The university's baseball field was re-named after him in 2004. After the death of Ernie Smith in 1969, Etzel also served as the interim head coach of the University of Portland men's basketball team for its 1969–1970 season.

Etzel married the former Judy Kehoe (1940–2023) in 1962. They had four children. Etzel was a Roman Catholic.
