= Dax Whitney =

American baseball player (born 2006)

Oregon State Beavers – No. 8
- Pitcher
- Born: January 17, 2006 (age 20); Blackfoot, Idaho, U.S.
- Bats: Right Throws: Right
- Stats at Baseball Reference

Daxson Marshall Whitney (born January 17, 2006) is an American college baseball pitcher for the Oregon State Beavers.

== Career ==
Whitney attended Blackfoot High School in Blackfoot, Idaho, where he played baseball and basketball. In 2023, he batted .453 with thirty RBIs as a shortstop and went 5–1 with a 1.03 ERA as a pitcher. As a senior in 2024, he posted a 10–0 record with a 0.27 ERA and 130 strikeouts over 52 2/3 innings. He was named the Idaho Gatorade Baseball Player of the Year. Whitney was considered a top prospect for the 2024 Major League Baseball draft, but went unselected due to his strong commitment to Oregon State University to play for the Oregon State Beavers.

Whitney was inserted into Oregon State's starting rotation as a freshman in 2025. He pitched in the College World Series, including a 104 pitch performance with 12 strikeouts against Texas Christian University in the Corvallis Super Regional. Over 17 starts for the Beavers, Whitney went 6–3 with a 3.40 ERA and 120 strikeouts over 76 2/3 innings. After the season, he was selected to play for the United States national baseball team. Whitney was named the Beavers Opening Day starter against the Michigan Wolverines to open the 2026 season. On February 20, 2026, he tied Oregon State’s single-game strikeout record with 17 in a 3-1 win over Baylor University. On May 1, 2026, it was announced that Whitney would undergo surgery for a torn ulnar collateral ligament and miss the remainder of the 2026 season. Across 11 starts for the Beavers in 2026, Whitney pitched to a 6–1 record, a 2.00 ERA, and 104 strikeouts over 63 innings. Oregon State head coach Mitch Canham later announced that Whitney would miss the entire 2027 season as well.
