= Mitch Canham =

American baseball player and coach

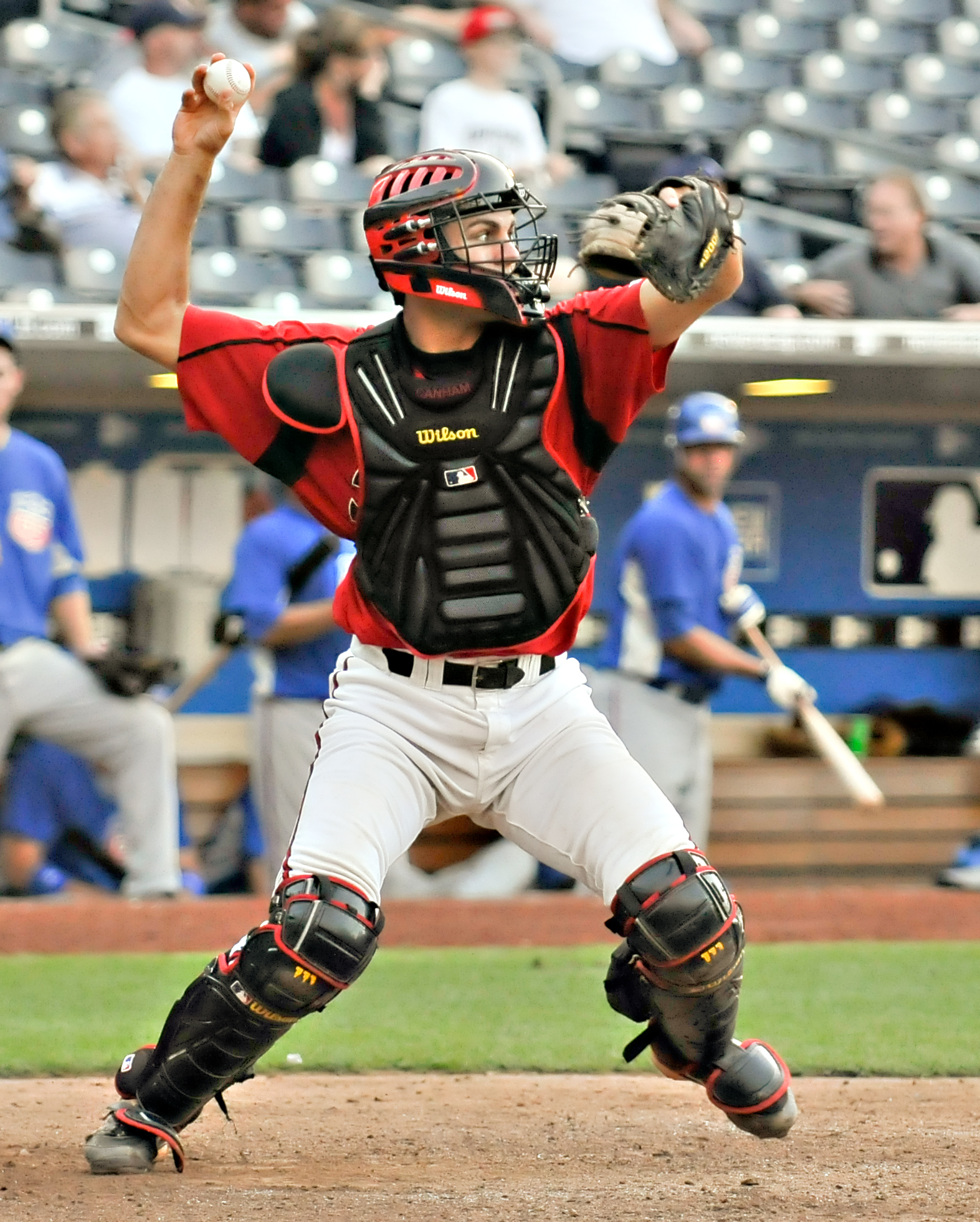
- Canham playing for the Lake Elsinore Storm in 2008

Current position
- Title: Head coach
- Team: Oregon State
- Conference: Pac-12
- Record: 269–117–1 (.696)

Biographical details
- Born: September 25, 1984 (age 42); Richland, Washington, U.S.

Playing career
- 2004–2007: Oregon State
- 2007: Eugene Emeralds
- 2007–2008: Lake Elsinore Storm
- 2009–2010: San Antonio Missions
- 2010: Portland Beavers
- 2011: Midland RockHounds
- 2011: Sacramento River Cats
- 2012: Memphis Redbirds
- 2012: Long Island Ducks
- 2013: Northwest Arkansas Naturals
- 2013: Omaha Storm Chasers
- 2014: Harrisburg Senators
- 2015: Lincoln Saltdogs
- Position: Catcher

Coaching career (HC unless noted)
- 2016: Clinton LumberKings
- 2017–2018: Modesto Nuts
- 2019: Arkansas Travelers
- 2020–present: Oregon State

Head coaching record
- Overall: 269–117–1 (.696)
- Tournaments: NCAA: 17–13 (.567)

Mitchell Dean Canham (born September 25, 1984) is an American baseball coach and former catcher, who is the current head baseball coach of the Oregon State Beavers. He previously served as manager for the Clinton LumberKings, Modesto Nuts, and Arkansas Travelers.

Canham played college baseball for the Oregon State Beavers, coached by Pat Casey, and was a member of the 2006 and 2007 teams that won back-to-back national championships at the College World Series.

He was drafted by the San Diego Padres of Major League Baseball (MLB) with the 57th overall pick in the 2007 Major League Baseball draft.

== Amateur career ==
Canham played for the Lake Stevens Junior Athletic Association (LSJAA) Tigers from 1995-1996. Canham attended Lake Stevens High School in Lake Stevens, Washington, where he was a three-sport star and honor student.

Canham was named to the preseason All-American second team by the Collegiate Baseball newspaper and as a third team All-American by Baseball America. He ended the season as a third-team All-American selection by the Collegiate Baseball newspaper. In 2006, he played collegiate summer baseball with the Falmouth Commodores of the Cape Cod Baseball League and was named a league all-star.

== Professional career ==
Canham began his professional career in 2007 with the short-season Eugene Emeralds of the Northwest League and the Class-A Advanced Lake Elsinore Storm. With the Emeralds Canham batted .293 with two home runs, four doubles, one triple, 34 hits and 18 RBIs in 28 games. In just two games with the Storm Canham had no hits and one RBI.

In 2008 Canham spent the entire season with Lake Elsinore of the California League. He hit .285 with eight home runs, 28 doubles, five triples, 119 hits, 13 steals and 81 RBI in 113 games.

2009 saw Canham a promotion to the Double-A San Antonio Missions of the Texas League. He finished the '09 campaign batting .263 with six home runs, 20 doubles, three triples, 107 hits, five stolen bases and 53 RBI in 111 games.

== Coaching career ==
Canham was named the manager of the Clinton LumberKings for the 2016 season. In 2017 and 2018, Canham was the manager of the Modesto Nuts. Canham managed the Arkansas Travelers for the first half of the 2019 season before resigning.

On June 13, 2019, Canham was named the head coach for the Oregon State Beavers. In July 2022, he signed a contract extension with the Beavers through the 2029 season.

== Head coaching record ==
Record table
Season	Team	Overall	Conference	Standing	Postseason
Oregon State Beavers (Pac-12 Conference) (2020–2024)
2020	Oregon State	5–9	0–0		Season canceled due to COVID-19
2021	Oregon State	37–24	16–14	T–5th	NCAA Regional
2022	Oregon State	48–18	20–10	2nd	NCAA Super Regional
2023	Oregon State	41–20	18–12	2nd	NCAA Regional
2024	Oregon State	45–16	19–10	2nd	NCAA Super Regional
Oregon State:		– (–)	73–46 (.613)		
Oregon State Beavers (Independent) (2025–present)
2025	Oregon State	48–16–1			College World Series
2026	Oregon State	45–14			NCAA Regional
Oregon State:		269–117–1 (.696)	– (–)		
Total:		269–117–1 (.696)			
National champion Postseason invitational champion Conference regular season champion Conference regular season and conference tournament champion Division regular season champion Division regular season and conference tournament champion Conference tournament champion

== Personal life ==
Canham's mother died while he was a freshman in college. His younger brother, Dustin Canham, died in 2008 while serving with the United States Marines in Djibouti; the circumstances surrounding Dustin Canham's death received national attention based on a perceived cover up by the military and allegations that the death was due to hazing.

Canham's great uncle, Major General Charles D. W. Canham, commanded the 29th Infantry Division's 116th Infantry Regiment during its D-Day landing on Omaha Beach, earning the Distinguished Service Cross for valor in combat.

Canham and his wife, Marlis, have two children.
