= K. J. Harrison =

American baseball player (born 1996)

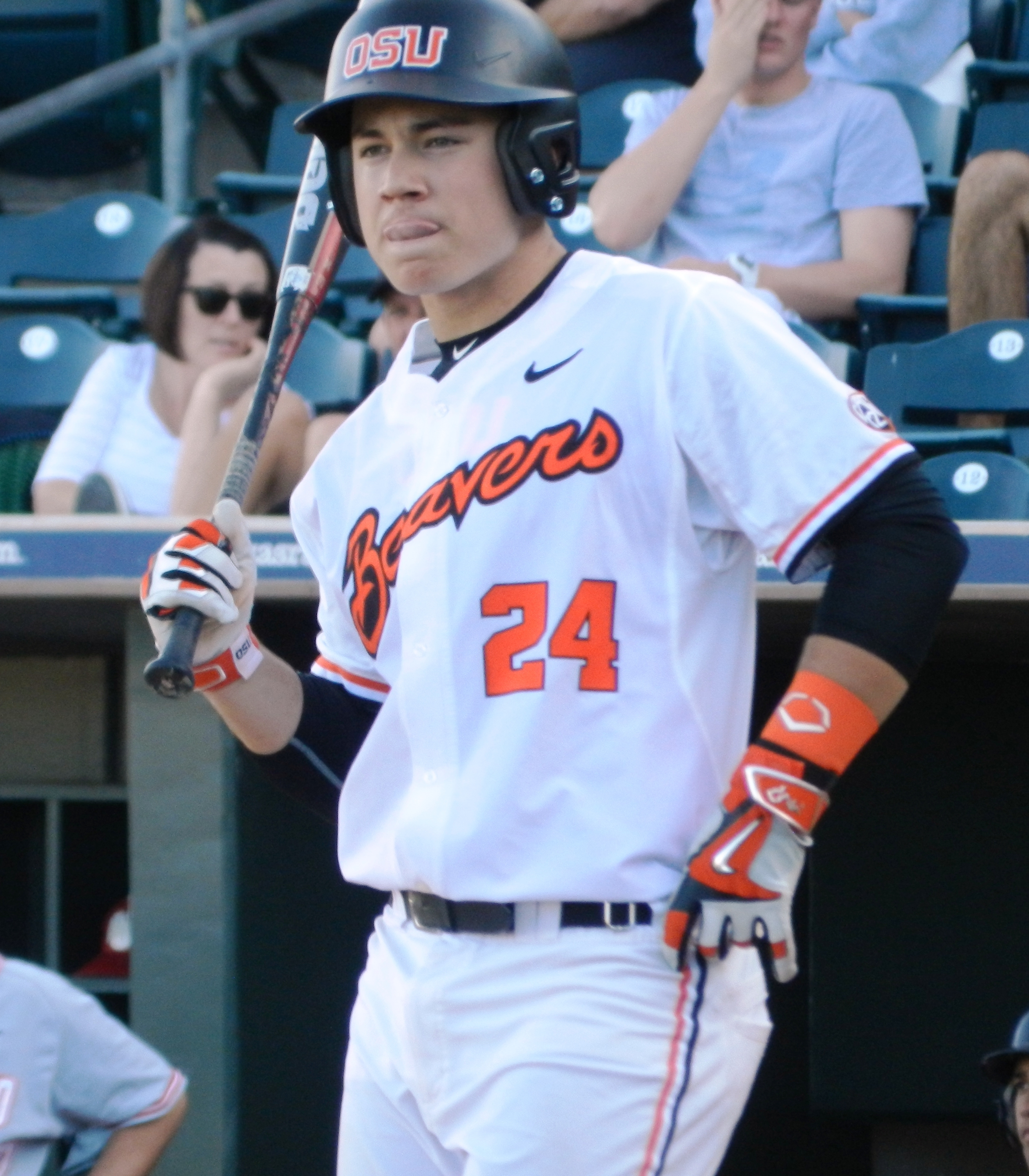
- Harrison with Oregon State in 2015
- Catcher / First baseman
- Born: August 11, 1996 (age 29); Kailua, Hawaii, U.S.
- Bats: Right Throws: Right
- Stats at Baseball Reference

Kainoa John Harrison (born August 11, 1996) is an American former professional baseball catcher and first baseman. He played college baseball for the Oregon State Beavers of Oregon State University.

== Career ==
=== Amateur career ===
Harrison attended Punahou School in Honolulu, Hawaii. The Cleveland Indians selected him in the 25th round, with the 758th overall selection, of the 2014 MLB draft. He opted not to sign with Cleveland.

Harrison enrolled at Oregon State University to play college baseball for the Oregon State Beavers. As a freshman in 2015, he played as a first baseman and led the Pac-12 Conference with 60 runs batted in (RBIs). He was named a Freshman All-American, the Pac-12 Conference Freshman of the Year, and the Pac-12 Conference First Team first baseman. He played collegiate summer baseball for the Corvallis Knights of the West Coast League. He was named a Preseason All-American in 2016. He was again named an All-Pac-12 first baseman for 2016. In the summer of 2016, Harrison played for the Wareham Gatemen of the Cape Cod Baseball League and the United States national collegiate baseball team. On June 19, 2017, Harrison hit the first grand slam in the College World Series at TD Ameritrade Park.

=== Professional career ===
The Milwaukee Brewers selected Harrison in the third round, with the 84th overall selection, of the 2017 MLB draft. Harrison signed with the Brewers for a $667,000 signing bonus, and was assigned to the Helena Brewers of the Rookie-level Pioneer League. He spent all of 2017 with Helena, posting a .308 batting average with ten home runs and 33 RBIs. Harrison began the 2018 season with the Wisconsin Timber Rattlers of the Class A Midwest League.

On August 31, 2018, Harrison and Gilbert Lara were traded to the Washington Nationals in exchange for Gio González. He split the 2019 season between the Hagerstown Suns and the Potomac Nationals, hitting a combined .266/.363/.435 with 13 home runs and 63 RBIs. He did not play during the 2020 season due to the cancellation of the minor league season because of the COVID-19 pandemic. He began the 2021 season with the Harrisburg Senators.

=== Retirement ===
Harrison announced his retirement from professional baseball on July 16, 2022 and that he would join the coaching staff at Hawaii as an undergraduate assistant.

== Personal life ==
His father, Kenny Harrison, is a former professional baseball player.
