= Pat Casey (baseball) =

American baseball coach (born 1959)

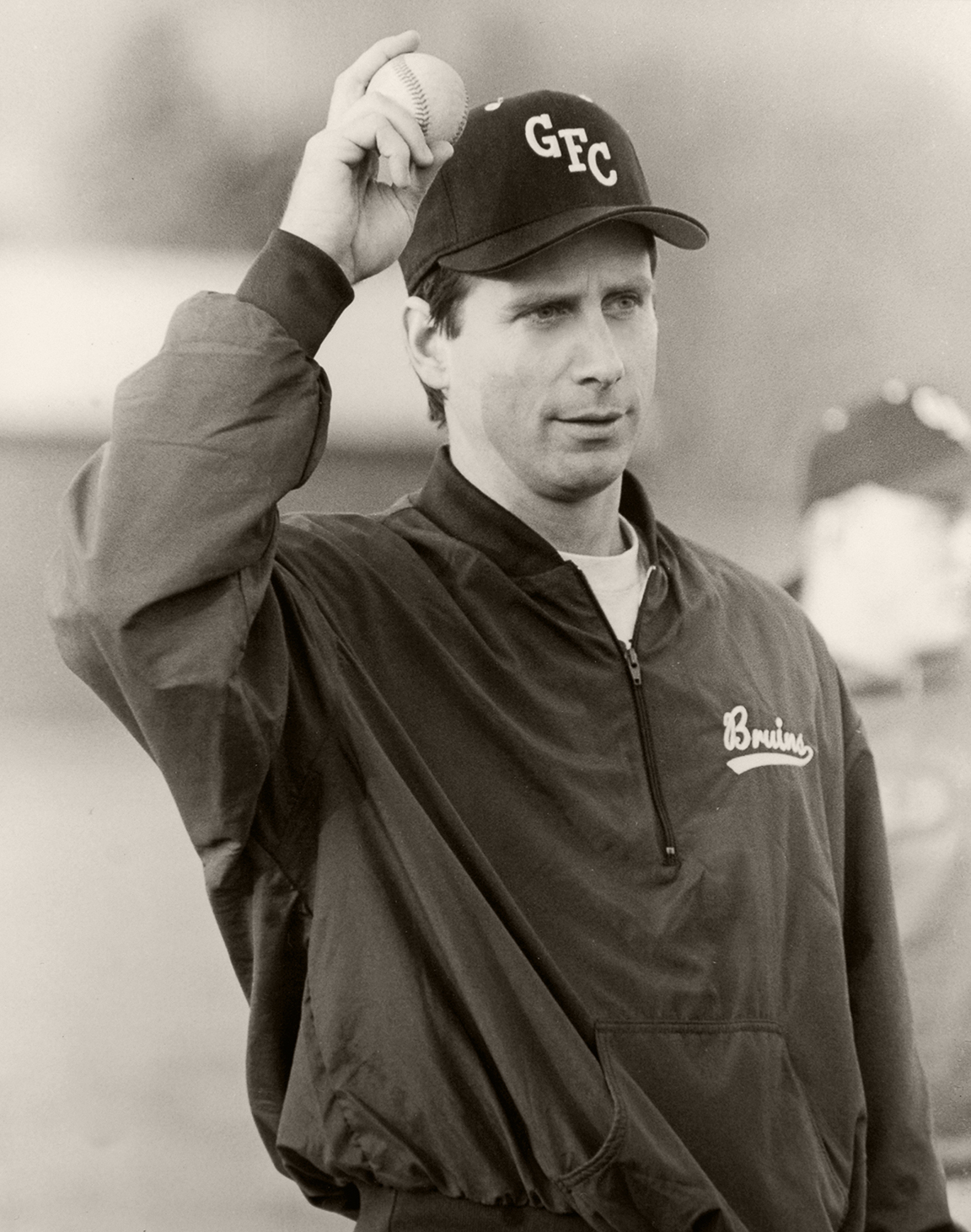
- Casey coaching at George Fox College

Biographical details
- Born: March 17, 1959 (age 67); McMinnville, Oregon, U.S.
- Education: George Fox University

Playing career
- 1978–1980: Portland
- Position: Outfielder

Coaching career (HC unless noted)
- 1988–1994: George Fox
- 1995–2018: Oregon State

Head coaching record
- Overall: 1,071–571–7 (.651)

Accomplishments and honors

Championships
- 3× College World Series (2006, 2007, 2018); 5× Pac-10/Pac-12 (2005, 2006, 2013, 2014, 2017)

Awards
- Baseball America College Coach of the Year (2006); NCBWA National Coach of the Year (2017); Pac-10 Northern Division Coach of the Year (1997); 5× Pac-10/Pac-12 Coach of the Year (2005, 2006, 2011, 2013, 2017)

Patrick Michael Casey (born March 17, 1959) is an American college baseball coach who was the head coach for the Oregon State Beavers baseball team from 1995 to 2018. He is best known for winning the 2006 College World Series for the Beavers' first-ever baseball National Championship. The following year, he led the Beavers to a repeat championship in the 2007 College World Series, the first unranked team in history to accomplish this feat. He retired from Oregon State after winning his third national championship in the 2018 College World Series.

== Playing career ==
A three-sport athlete at Newberg High School, Casey attended the University of Portland where he played baseball as well as basketball. In baseball, he was named to the All-Pac-10 Conference Northern Division first team in 1979 and 1980, and was drafted in the 10th round by the San Diego Padres in the 1980 Major League Baseball draft. He played seven seasons in the minor leagues, first with the Padres organization from 1980 to 1984, then with the Seattle Mariners organization from 1985 to 1986 and finally the Minnesota Twins triple-A affiliate Portland Beavers in 1987.

== Coaching career ==
After his playing career ended, Casey became head baseball coach at George Fox University, where he earned his undergraduate degree in 1990, also playing basketball for the school while coaching baseball. In seven seasons at George Fox, his baseball team compiled a 171–114–1 record.

In 1995, he was named head coach at Oregon State, where through the 2018 season, he had compiled a 900–458–6 record. Casey focused on recruiting players from the Pacific Northwest. He guided the Beavers to three straight 45+ win seasons, including back-to-back Pac-10 championships, six trips to the College World Series, and three national championships. He is the only coach in NCAA history to lead a team to the National Championship after playing in six elimination games, which he accomplished twice (in 2006 and 2018). After winning the 2006 national championship, the program received its first ever number 1 ranking by all four college baseball polls. He was named the Pac-12 Coach of the year in 2005, 2006, 2011, 2013 and 2017, and was named Baseball America Coach of the Year in 2006 and NCBWA Coach of the Year in 2017. In 2010, Casey was named Baseball America's Coach of the Decade for the years 2000–2009. On September 6, 2018, Casey announced his retirement from Oregon State.

During his career, Notre Dame (after 2006 season) and Texas (after 2016 season) offered him the position of head coach, but Casey decided to stay at Oregon State.

== Head coaching record ==
Record table
Season	Team	Overall	Conference	Standing	Postseason
George Fox Bruins (Metro Valley Conference) (1988–1992)
1988	George Fox	15–14			NAIA District
1989	George Fox	22–14			NAIA District
1990	George Fox	24–17			NAIA District
1991	George Fox	24–21			NAIA Area
1992	George Fox	29–18			NAIA Area
George Fox Bruins (Cascade League/Cascade Conference) (1993–1994)
1993	George Fox	26–16–1	14–3	1st	NAIA Area
1994	George Fox	31–13	16–2	1st	NAIA District
George Fox:		171–113–1 (.602)			
Oregon State Beavers (Pacific-10/Pac-12 Conference) (1995–present)
1995	Oregon State	25–24–1	14–16	4th (North)	
1996	Oregon State	32–16–1	14–10	2nd (North)	
1997	Oregon State	38–12–1	18–6	2nd (North)	
1998	Oregon State	35–14–1	15–9	2nd (North)	
1999	Oregon State	19–35	7–17	8th	
2000	Oregon State	28–27	9–15	6th	
2001	Oregon State	31–24	11–13	6th	
2002	Oregon State	31–23	10–14	6th	
2003	Oregon State	25–28	7–17	T–8th	
2004	Oregon State	31–22	10–14	T–6th	
2005	Oregon State	46–12	19–5	1st	College World Series
2006	Oregon State	50–16	16–7	1st	College World Series champions
2007	Oregon State	49–18	10–14	T–6th	College World Series champions
2008	Oregon State	28–24	11–13	T–6th	
2009	Oregon State	37–19	15–12	T–3rd	NCAA Regional
2010	Oregon State	32–23	12–15	T–7th	NCAA Regional
2011	Oregon State	41–19	17–10	T–2nd	NCAA Super Regional
2012	Oregon State	40–20	18–12	T–4th	NCAA Regional
2013	Oregon State	52–13	24–6	1st	College World Series
2014	Oregon State	45–14	23–7	1st	NCAA Regional
2015	Oregon State	39–18–1	19–10–1	2nd	NCAA Regional
2016	Oregon State	35–19	16–14	T-3rd	
2017	Oregon State	56–6	27–3	1st	College World Series
2018	Oregon State	55–12–1	20–9–1	2nd	College World Series champions
Oregon State:		900–458–6 (.662)	362–268–2 (.574)		
Total:		1,071–571–7 (.652)			
National champion Postseason invitational champion Conference regular season champion Conference regular season and conference tournament champion Division regular season champion Division regular season and conference tournament champion Conference tournament champion

== Personal life ==
Casey and his wife Susan have three sons and one daughter. Casey is a Roman Catholic and often attends daily Mass.

Casey's brother, Chris, is the head football coach for George Fox University.
