= Jeff Doyle (baseball) =

American baseball player (born 1956)

- Second baseman
- Born: October 2, 1956 (age 69); Havre, Montana, U.S.
- Batted: Switch Threw: Right

MLB debut
- September 13, 1983, for the St. Louis Cardinals

Last MLB appearance
- October 2, 1983, for the St. Louis Cardinals

MLB statistics
- Batting average: .297
- Home runs: 0
- Runs batted in: 2

NPB statistics
- Batting average: .263
- Home runs: 29
- Runs batted in: 93
- Stats at Baseball Reference

Teams
- St. Louis Cardinals (1983); Nankai Hawks (1984–1985)

Jeffrey Donald Doyle (born October 2, 1956) is an American former Major League Baseball second baseman. He was drafted out of Oregon State University by the St. Louis Cardinals in the 6th round of the 1977 amateur draft, and played for the Cardinals in 1983.

== Career ==
At Oregon State, Doyle set single-season records for runs, triples and stolen bases.

Doyle began his professional career in 1977 with the Calgary Cardinals but suffered a knee injury that season which required two surgeries and forced him to miss the entire 1978 season.

On September 13, 1983, Doyle made his major league debut as a pinch hitter at Three Rivers Stadium. Batting for pitcher Dave Von Ohlen in the 5th inning against Pirates right-hander Rick Rhoden, he lined out to shortstop Dale Berra. He made his first appearance in the starting lineup on September 17, and went 2-for-3 against Philadelphia Phillies starter John Denny at Veterans Stadium. The Phils won, 4–1.

Doyle put up good numbers during his short stay in the big leagues. In 13 games he went 11-for-37 (.297) with a double, two triples, and two runs batted in. He scored four runs and had a slugging percentage of .432. In the field he handled 57 out of 59 chances successfully and turned 11 double plays.

He was released by St. Louis on December 15, 1983. He then played two seasons in Japan for the Nankai Hawks in 1984 and 1985

== Personal life ==
Doyle married Oregon State Beavers tennis player Liz Toole, with whom he had at least one child.

Doyle built, owns and operates Diamond Woods Golf Course in Monroe, Oregon. Doyle's brother Greg designed the golf course.
