= Joey Wong (baseball) =

American baseball player (born 1988)

- Infielder
- Born: April 12, 1988 (age 37); Salem, Oregon, U.S.
- Bats: Left Throws: Right
- Stats at Baseball Reference

Joey Kawika Wong (born April 12, 1988) is an American former professional baseball infielder who played internationally for the Chinese national baseball team in 2017, and is currently a coach at Oregon State University. He was drafted by the Colorado Rockies in the 24th round of the 2009 Major League Baseball draft.

== Playing career ==
=== Amateur ===
Wong attended Sprague High School in Salem, Oregon, and Oregon State University. Playing college baseball for the Oregon State Beavers, Wong was a member of the 2007 College World Series champions. In 2007 and 2008, he played collegiate summer baseball with the Falmouth Commodores of the Cape Cod Baseball League.

=== Colorado Rockies ===
The Colorado Rockies drafted Wong in the 24th round, with the 721st overall selection, of the 2009 Major League Baseball draft. He made his professional debut with the Low-A Tri-City Dust Devils. In 2010, Wong played for the Single-A Asheville Tourists, posting a .223/.296/.311 slash line in 84 games. He returned to Asheville in 2011, and hit .286/.353/.408 with 6 home runs and 55 RBI in 101 games. In 2012, Wong split the season between Tri-City, Asheville, and the High-A Modesto Nuts, accumulating a .241/.321/.339 slash line with 1 home run and 20 RBI between the three teams. The following year, Wong played for the Double-A Tulsa Drillers, posting a .240/.304/.330 slash line with 2 home runs and 19 RBI. Wong returned to Tulsa in 2014, but struggled, hitting .221/.285/.298 with 2 home runs and 18 RBI.

In 2015, Wong split the year between the Low-A Boise Hawks, the Double-A New Britain Rock Cats, and the Triple-A Albuquerque Isotopes, batting a cumulative .248/.304/.326 with no home runs and 23 RBI. On November 6, 2015, he elected free agency, but re-signed with the organization on a minor league contract on December 4. For the 2016 season, Wong returned to Albuquerque, logging a .233/.343/.302 slash line with one home run and 28 RBI in 91 games. He elected free agency again on November 7, 2016.

=== Seattle Mariners ===
On March 15, 2017, Wong signed a minor league contract with the Seattle Mariners organization. He split the year between the Double-A Arkansas Travelers and the Triple-A Tacoma Rainiers, slashing .239/.358/.291 with 3 home runs and 34 RBI. Wong elected free agency following the season on November 6.

=== Southern Maryland Blue Crabs ===
On February 7, 2018, Wong signed with the Southern Maryland Blue Crabs of the Atlantic League of Professional Baseball. In 18 games with the Blue Crabs, Wong logged a .239/.337/.268 slash line with no home runs and 5 RBI.

=== New York Mets ===
Wong's contract was purchased by the New York Mets organization on May 19, 2018. After hitting just .196 between the Triple-A Las Vegas 51s and the Double-A Binghamton Rumble Ponies, Wong was released by the organization on August 4, 2018.

=== St. Paul Saints ===
On August 7, 2018, Wong signed with the St. Paul Saints of the American Association of Independent Professional Baseball. He appeared in 26 games with the Saints, batting .272/.385/.358 with 1 home run and 12 RBI. Wong batted .218/.322/.374 in 40 games with St. Paul in 2019 before he was released by the team on September 17, 2019.

=== International play ===
Wong competed for the Chinese national baseball team in the 2017 World Baseball Classic.

== Coaching career ==
On August 6, 2019, Wong returned to his alma mater, Oregon State University, as an undergraduate assistant coach.
