= Aiva Arquette =

American baseball player (born 2003)

Miami Marlins
- Shortstop
- Born: October 17, 2003 (age 22); Honolulu, Hawaii, U.S.
- Bats: Right Throws: Right
- Stats at Baseball Reference

Aiva John Uakea Arquette (born October 17, 2003) is an American professional baseball infielder in the Miami Marlins organization. He played college baseball for the Oregon State Beavers and Washington Huskies.

== Amateur career ==
Arquette attended Saint Louis School in Honolulu, Hawaii. Along with baseball, he also played basketball in high school and was named the Hawaii Gatorade Basketball Player of the Year as a senior in 2022. The Arizona Diamondbacks selected Arquette in the 18th round of the 2022 Major League Baseball (MLB) draft, but he did not sign and played college baseball at the University of Washington.

As a freshman at Washington in 2023, Arquette played in only 15 games with 12 starts due to injuries and hit .244/.393/.578 with five home runs and 11 runs batted in (RBI) in 56 plate appearances. As a sophomore in 2024, he started all 48 games, hitting .325/.384/.574 with 12 home runs and 36 RBI over 229 plate appearances. He played collegiate summer baseball for the Wenatchee AppleSox in 2022 and Chatham Anglers in the Cape Cod League in 2024.

Prior to his junior year, Arquette entered the transfer portal and transferred to Oregon State University. After playing multiple infield positions with the Huskies, he primarily played shortstop with the Beavers in 2025. He was considered one of the top prospects ahead of the 2025 MLB draft.

== Professional career ==
Arquette was drafted by the Miami Marlins with the seventh overall selection of the 2025 Major League Baseball draft. He signed with Miami for a $7.15 million signing bonus on July 19, 2025. Arquette made his professional debut debut with the High-A Beloit Sky Carp, batting .242/.350/.323 with one home run, 10 RBI, and seven stolen bases across 27 appearances.

On February 28, 2026, Arquette was ruled out for at least four-to-six weeks after undergoing core muscle surgery.

== Personal life ==
Arquette's parents are Athens and Marisel Arquette. His father played football at Menlo College. His great grandfather played baseball for the San Francisco Seals.
