= Travis Bazzana =

Australian baseball player (born 2002)

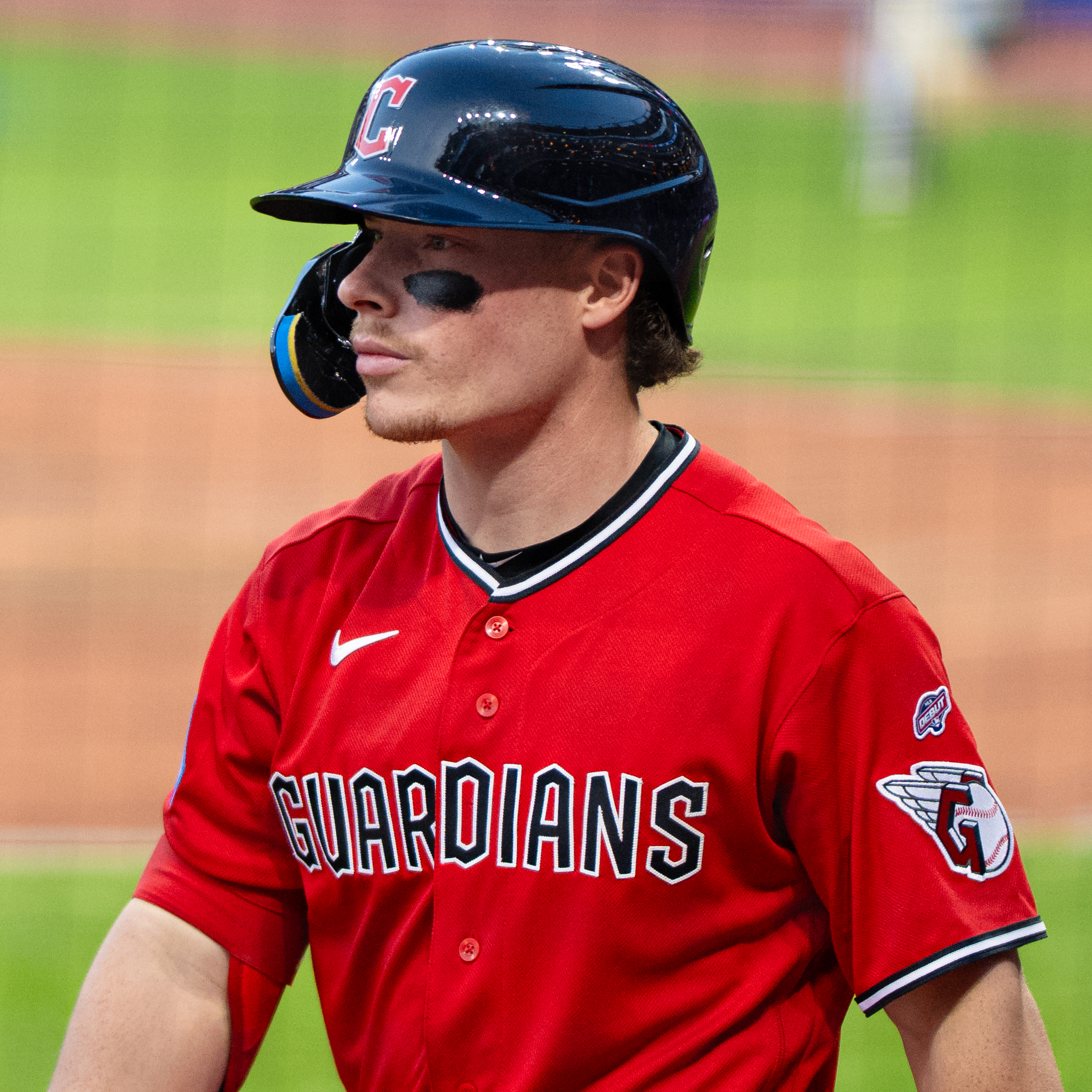
- Bazzana during his first game with the Cleveland Guardians on 28 April 2026

Cleveland Guardians – No. 37
- Second baseman
- Born: August 28, 2002 (age 24); Hornsby, New South Wales, Australia
- Bats: Left Throws: Right

MLB debut
- April 28, 2026, for the Cleveland Guardians

MLB statistics (through 2026 season)
- Batting average: .245
- Home runs: 15
- Runs batted in: 57
- Stats at Baseball Reference

Teams
- Cleveland Guardians (2026–present)

Career highlights and awards
- All-Star (2026)

Travis William Bazzana (born 28 August 2002) is an Australian professional baseball second baseman for the Cleveland Guardians of Major League Baseball (MLB). He was selected first overall by the Guardians in the 2024 MLB draft and made his MLB debut in 2026, with him also making his first All-Star game appearance the same year.

== Amateur career ==
Bazzana attended Turramurra High School in South Turramurra, a suburb on the Upper North Shore region of Sydney, New South Wales, Australia. At Turramurra, Bazzana played cricket as a wicketkeeper/opening batsman, and captained his team when they won their first-ever New South Wales state championship.

Bazzana played junior baseball with the Ku-Ring-Gai Stealers, and representative junior baseball for the Ryde Hawks Baseball League. From 2018 to 2021, he played for the Sydney Blue Sox in the Australian Baseball League. In 2019, he represented Australia in the 2019 U-18 Baseball World Cup. In 2021, he played for the Corvallis Knights in the West Coast League, and represented Australia again at the 2022 U-23 Baseball World Cup.

As a freshman at Oregon State University in 2022, Bazzana hit .306/.425/.478 (Note: Batting statistics listed as batting average, on-base percentage, slugging percentage.) with six home runs and 44 runs batted in (RBI) over 245 at bats in 63 games. As a sophomore in 2023, he hit .374/.500/.622 with 11 home runs, 55 RBI and a school-record 36 stolen bases over 238 at bats in 61 games. After the season, he played for the Falmouth Commodores of the Cape Cod League, where he was named the MVP after hitting .375/.456/.581 with six home runs and 31 RBI. In 2024, he led the Pac-12 Conference in batting average, on-base percentage, slugging percentage, home runs, walks and runs. His 26 home runs were a single-season school record and he also broke the school's career home run record that year. He was named the Pac-12 Player of the Year.

== Professional career ==
Bazzana's first professional baseball home run, a grand slam for the Lake County Captains, on 31 July 2024

The Guardians selected Bazzana with the first overall pick in the 2024 Major League Baseball draft, becoming the first Australian first overall pick, first second-baseman first overall pick, as well as the second Oregon State Beaver to do so after Adley Rutschman in 2019. On 19 July 2024, Bazzana signed with Cleveland on a contract worth $8.95 million. He was assigned to the High-A Lake County Captains on 26 July and made his professional debut the same day. Bazzana batted .238 with three home runs and five stolen bases for Lake County, helping the team win the 2024 Midwest League title.

Bazzana began the 2025 season with the Double-A Akron RubberDucks, where he hit .260 with four home runs, 17 RBI, and eight stolen bases over his first 34 games. On 20 May 2025, it was announced that Bazzana would miss eight-to-ten weeks after suffering a right internal oblique strain. In August, the Guardians promoted Bazzana to the Triple-A Columbus Clippers.

The Guardians selected Bazzana's contract on 28 April 2026, adding him to their active roster. He made his MLB debut that day, and went 0-for-2 with two walks. Bazzana hit his first major-league home run on 8 May against Connor Prielipp of the Minnesota Twins in a 6-4 win. Bazzana was voted by his fellow major leaguers to play in the 2026 Major League Baseball All-Star Game. He was the second Australian player to make the All Star Game, 27 years after Dave Nilsson became the first. On 18 July, Bazzana hit a walk–off home run against Pittsburgh Pirates reliever Dennis Santana; in doing so, he became the first Australian player since 1900 to record a walk–off homer, as well as the first Cleveland rookie to do so since Bobby Bradley in 2021.

== International career ==
Bazzana represented Australia in the 2026 edition of the World Baseball Classic. In Team Australia's opener, he hit a home run off of Chinese Taipei pitcher Chang Yi in the bottom of the seventh inning in an eventual 3–0 shutout victory.

== See also ==
- List of Major League Baseball players from Australia
