= Joe Etzel Field =

Baseball stadium on the University of Portland campus in Portland, Oregon, U.S.

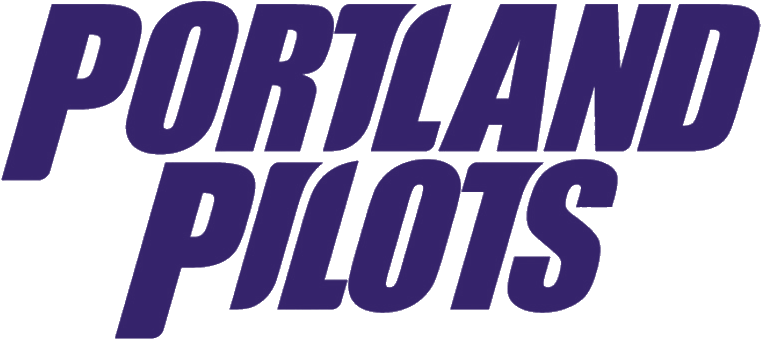

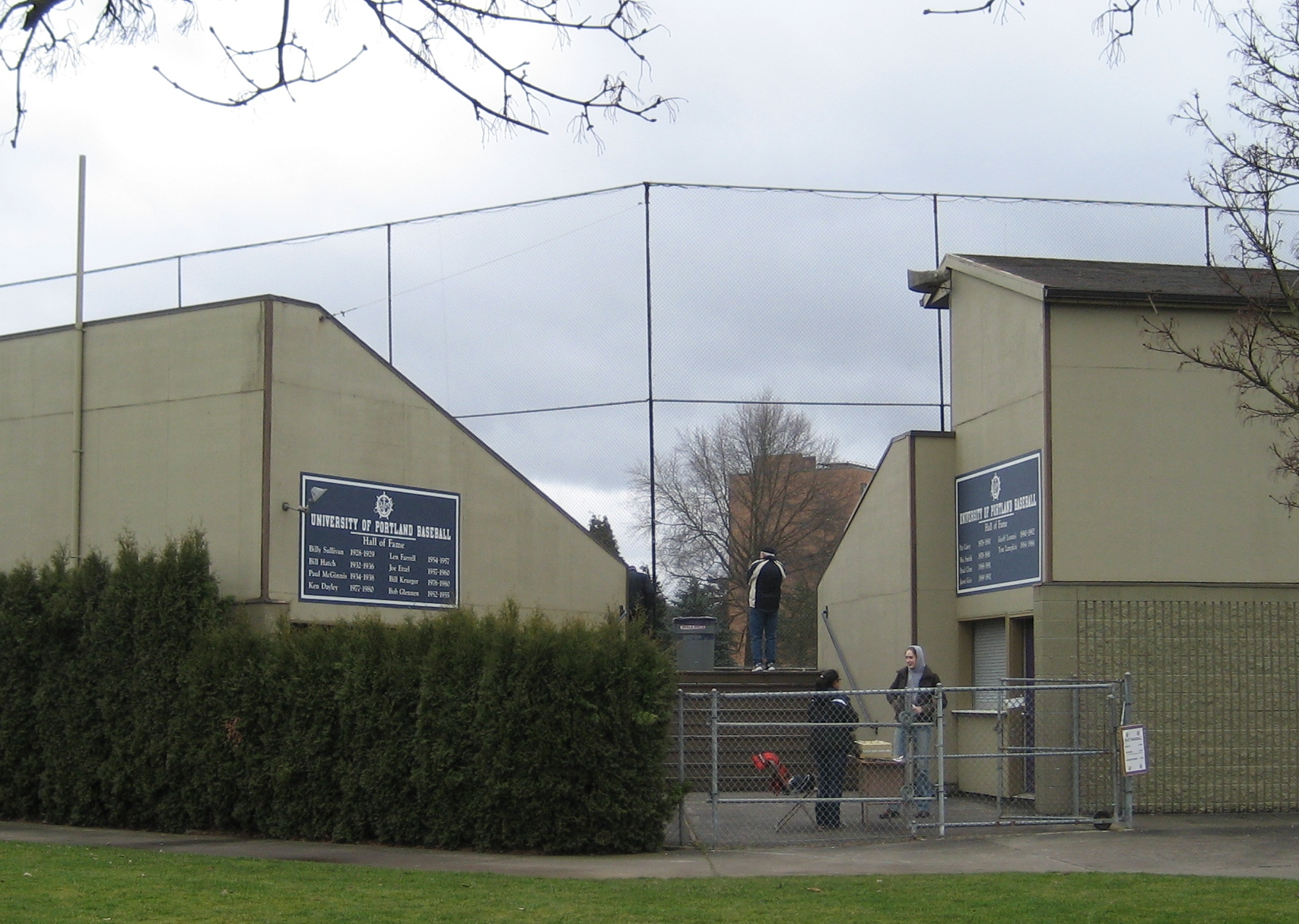
- Exterior view of the stadium in 2009
- Interactive map of Joe Etzel Field
- Location: Portland, Oregon
- Coordinates: 45.573971°N 122.729457°W
- Owner: University of Portland
- Capacity: 1,300
- Field size: Left Field - 325ft Center Field - 390ft Right Field - 325ft

Construction
- Opened: 1967; 59 years ago

Tenant
- Portland Pilots baseball

Website
- portlandpilots.com/joe-etzel-field

Joe Etzel Field is a 1,300 seat baseball stadium that is in Portland, Oregon which is home to the University of Portland Pilots baseball team. Previously named Pilot Field (Stadium), but it was renamed after their former coach and long-time school athletic director Joe Etzel. The stadium is located next to the university's other main athletic facilities, Merlo Field and the Chiles Center.

== History ==
The school's first baseball diamond was near Howard Hall, and then in 1958 it was moved to the current location of the Chiles Center. In 1967, a new baseball field was built at the current location, then known as Farley Field. The pilots made it a stadium in 1988, and the first game played at then Pilot Stadium was on February 23, 1988, vs. George Fox University, a 15–1 win for the Pilots, when the stadium had a capacity of 700. The college added 300 seats in 1996.

In 2004, the stadium was renamed as Joe Etzel Field. The baseball team's practice facility, the Andy Pienovi Hitting Facility, was added in 2005. Preliminary campus expansion plans included moving the baseball field from its current location to one on the waterfront in the Triangle Park property. Those plans were abandoned in 2013 with plans to instead renovate the existing stadium. The Pilots added 300 more seats when adding a berm on the first base side in 2015. The school added artificial turf and lighting in 2014 to 2015. The upgrades also included larger dugouts and press box improvements. THe sound system was updated in 2022.

== Features ==
The dimensions for the playing field are as follows: 325 feet (99 m) down the left field line, 368 feet (112 m) to left-center, 388 feet (118 m) to straight away center, 370 feet (110 m) to right-center, and 325 feet (99 m) down the right field line. Etzel Field's playing surface is AstroTurf. The Andy Pienovi Hitting Facility is located in foul territory in left field. The stadium also includes a press box, concession stands, and bleachers. The pressbox is a single-story, 4,000-square-foot (370 m^{2}) space built using mass timber.

== See also ==
- List of NCAA Division I baseball venues
- List of sports venues in Portland, Oregon
- West Coast Conference
