= Ben Wetzler =

American baseball player (born 1991)

Free agent
- Pitcher
- Born: September 12, 1991 (age 34); Clackamas, Oregon, U.S.
- Bats: Left Throws: Left
- Stats at Baseball Reference

Benjamin Alen Holmes-Wetzler (born September 12, 1991) is an American professional baseball pitcher who is a free agent. He attended Oregon State University, and played for the Oregon State Beavers.

Wetzler starred for the baseball team at Clackamas High School in Clackamas, Oregon. He then enrolled at Oregon State to play for the Beavers. After his junior year, the Philadelphia Phillies selected Wetzler in the fifth round of the 2013 Major League Baseball draft. Wetzler used an agent for negotiations, against National Collegiate Athletic Association (NCAA) rules, but "something that reportedly happens all the time". When Wetzler chose to return to Oregon State rather than sign, the Phillies reported Wetzler's violation to the NCAA.

== Amateur career ==
Wetzler attended Clackamas High School in Clackamas, Oregon. He pitched to a 12–0 win–loss record and a 0.33 earned run average (ERA) in his senior year, as well as a complete game shutout in the Class 6A state championship game. Wetzler was named the Class 6A player of the year. He finished his high school career with a 28–3 win–loss record, a 0.87 ERA, and 342 strikeouts.

The Cleveland Indians of Major League Baseball (MLB) selected Wetzler in the 15th round of the 2010 MLB draft. He did not sign with Cleveland, and instead enrolled at Oregon State University, to play college baseball for the Oregon State Beavers baseball team. In 2012, he played collegiate summer baseball with the Falmouth Commodores of the Cape Cod Baseball League. As a junior, Wetzler pitched to a 10–1 win–loss record with a 2.25 ERA, and was named an All-Pac-12 Conference selection.

The Philadelphia Phillies selected Wetzler in the fifth round of the 2013 MLB draft, with the 151st overall selection. Wetzler did not sign, opting to return to Oregon State for his senior year. The Phillies reported Wetlzer and Jason Monda of Washington State University, their sixth round pick who also did not sign, to the National Collegiate Athletic Association (NCAA) for violating the rule against using a sports agent during financial negotiations, which is "something that reportedly happens all the time". The NCAA suspended Wetzler for 11 games, which is 20% of the Beavers' season. He made his season debut on March 2, defeating the Wright State Raiders, and then beating the Northern Illinois Huskies the next week. Weztler recorded his 31st win at the Oregon State on April 25, setting a new school record. Collegiate Baseball named Wetzler a First Team All-American.

== Professional career ==
=== Miami Marlins ===
The Miami Marlins selected Wetzler in the ninth round, with the 257th overall selection, of the 2014 MLB draft. He signed and spent 2014 with the Batavia Muckdogs where he was 0–2 with a 2.95 ERA in 11 games started. In 2015, he played for both the Greensboro Grasshoppers and Jupiter Hammerheads where he pitched to a combined 6–7 record with a 4.55 ERA in 27 games (24 starts), and in 2016, he returned to Greensboro and Jupiter where he posted a 7–2 record, 1.18 ERA, and 0.99 WHIP in 35 games (34 relief appearances). Wetzler spent 2017 with Jupiter where he collected a 1–6 record and 4.17 ERA in 73 1/3 innings pitched. He began the 2018 season split between Jupiter and the Double-A Jacksonville Jumbo Shrimp, and was released by the organization on June 27, 2018, after allowing 7 earned runs in 11 1/3 innings.

=== Los Angeles Dodgers ===
On July 6, 2018, Holmes signed a minor league contract with the Los Angeles Dodgers. He split the remainder of the 2018 season between the High-A Rancho Cucamonga Quakes and the Double-A Tulsa Drillers, recording a 2.82 ERA in Tulsa and a 1.06 ERA with the Quakes. He split 2019 between the Triple-A Oklahoma City Dodgers and Tulsa, pitching to a 2–4 record and 5.31 ERA with 64 strikeouts in 61.0 innings of work. Wetzler did not play in a game in 2020 due to the cancellation of the minor league season because of the COVID-19 pandemic. He was released by the Dodgers organization on July 1, 2020.

=== Chicago Cubs ===
On February 23, 2021, Wetzler signed a minor league contract with the Chicago Cubs organization. He was assigned to the Triple-A Iowa Cubs to begin the season. He made two starts for Iowa, struggling to an 0–1 record and 6.52 ERA with 9 strikeouts in 9 2/3 innings pitched. He was released by the Cubs on June 24, 2022.

=== Milwaukee Milkmen ===
On July 15, 2022, Holmes signed with the Milwaukee Milkmen of the American Association of Professional Baseball. Holmes made 11 appearances (4 starts) for Milwaukee down the stretch, logging a 4–0 record and 6.03 ERA with 27 strikeouts in 37 1/3 innings pitched.

=== Chicago White Sox ===
On March 14, 2023, prior to the start of the American Association season, Holmes’ contract was purchased by the Chicago White Sox organization. In 31 combined appearances between the Double–A Birmingham Barons and Triple–A Charlotte Knights, he accumulated a 2–6 record and 5.25 ERA with 42 strikeouts and 4 saves in 36 innings of work. On July 25, Holmes was released by Chicago.

=== Fargo-Moorhead RedHawks ===
On August 26, 2023, Holmes signed with the Fargo-Moorhead RedHawks of the American Association of Professional Baseball. In four games for Fargo, Holmes recorded a 2.25 ERA with two strikeouts and one save across four innings.

=== El Águila de Veracruz ===
On March 11, 2024, Holmes signed with El Águila de Veracruz of the Mexican League. In 7 games (6 starts) for Veracruz, he struggled to a 6.91 ERA with 23 strikeouts across 27 1/3 innings pitched. Holmes was released by the team on May 27.

=== Caliente de Durango ===
On May 30, 2024, Holmes signed with the Caliente de Durango of the Mexican League. In 11 appearances (10 starts) for Durango, he compiled a 4-5 record and 5.82 ERA with 37 strikeouts over 51 innings of work. Holmes was released by the Caliente on April 29, 2025.

=== Rieleros de Aguascalientes ===
On May 8, 2026, Holmes signed with the Rieleros de Aguascalientes of the Mexican Baseball League. In eight appearances (seven starts) for the team, he posted a 1–3 record with a 6.50 ERA, 18 strikeouts, and 13 walks over 36 innings pitched. On June 19, Holmes was released by Aguascalientes.

== Personal ==
In 2001, Wetzler was named the junior champion in sheep showing at the Clackamas County fair.
