= Gavin Turley =

American baseball player (born 2003)

Athletics
- Outfielder
- Born: November 12, 2003 (age 22); Chandler, Arizona, U.S.
- Bats: Right Throws: Right

Gavin Daniel Turley (born November 12, 2003) is an American professional baseball outfielder in the Athletics organization.

== Amateur career ==
Turley attended Hamilton High School in Chandler, Arizona. As an incoming senior, Turley attended the Perfect Game All-American Game and was aFirst-Team All-State selection while at Hamilton High School. Turley was a top ranked prospect in the 2022 MLB draft. Turley led Hamilton a 29-4 record as a senior where he batted .317 with 32 hits in 33 games as a senior. Tallied eight doubles and 15 home runs with 31 RBI. The Arizona Diamondbacks selected Turley in the 19th round of the 2022 MLB draft, but he did not sign and played college baseball at Oregon State University, where he was committed. Turley was ranked the 5th best outfielder, 16th overall in the country according to Perfect Game Baseball. He was Arizona's number one player in his class.

In Turley's freshman season, he played in 44 games, starting 39. He hit .309 with nine doubles, one triple and a team-best 14 home runs, with 46 RBI. He was named Perfect Game Second-Team Freshman All-American and Baton Rouge Regional All-Tournament Team. In 2023, he played collegiate summer baseball with the Falmouth Commodores of the Cape Cod Baseball League.

In 2024, Turley was named to the All-Pac-12 First Team and Corvallis Regional All-Tournament Team. He was the lone player on the Oregon State team to play in and start all 61 games. He batted .277 with 13 doubles, one triple, 19 home runs (tying second on his team and in the Pac-12), and a team-high 74 RBI.

In Turley's final season as a Beaver, he won named to a plethora of awards after Oregon State's very successful season. He was named to the Golden Spikes Award Preseason Watch List, ABCA All-America First Team, College Baseball Foundation All-America First Team, Baseball America All-America Second Team, D1Baseball.com All-America Second Team, College Sports Communicators Academic All-America First Team, ABCA All-Region First Team, Corvallis Regional All-Tournament Team, and was a Dick Howser Trophy Semifinalist. Turley played all 65 games in Oregon State's season, hitting .351 with 13 doubles, 20 home runs and 69 RBI. He was considered one of the top prospects ahead of the 2025 MLB draft.

== Professional career ==
Turley was drafted in the fourth round (110th overall) in the 2025 Major League Baseball draft by the Athletics. He signed with the team on July 23, 2025, for a $600,000 bonus.
