= 2018 College Baseball All-America Team =

This is a list of college baseball players named first team All-Americans for the 2018 NCAA Division I baseball season. From 2015 to 2018, there were six generally recognized All-America selectors for baseball: the American Baseball Coaches Association, Baseball America, Collegiate Baseball Newspaper, D1Baseball.com, the National Collegiate Baseball Writers Association, and Perfect Game. In order to be considered a "consensus" All-American, a player must have been selected by at least four of these.

== Key ==
A	American Baseball Coaches Association
B	Baseball America
C	Collegiate Baseball Newspaper
D	D1Baseball.com
N	National Collegiate Baseball Writers Association
P	Perfect Game
	Member of the National College Baseball Hall of Fame
	Consensus All-American – selected by all six organizations
	Consensus All-American – selected by four or five organizations

== All-Americans ==
Position	Name	School	#	A	B	C	D	N	P	Other awards and honors
Starting pitcher	Kyle Brnovich	Elon	1	—	—	—	—	—	✓	
Starting pitcher	Colton Eastman	Cal State Fullerton	1	—	—	—	✓	—	—	
Starting pitcher	Mason Feole	UConn	1	—	—	✓	—	—	—	
Starting pitcher	Logan Gilbert	Stetson	5	—	✓	✓	✓	✓	✓	
Starting pitcher	Luke Heimlich	Oregon State	2	—	—	✓	—	✓	—	National Pitcher of the Year
Starting pitcher	Blaine Knight	Arkansas	2	—	—	—	✓	✓	—	
Starting pitcher	Casey Mize	Auburn	4	✓	✓	—	—	✓	✓	First overall pick in the 2018 MLB draft
Starting pitcher	Joey Murray	Kent State	1	—	—	✓	—	—	—	
Starting pitcher	Andre Pallante	UC Irvine	2	✓	—	—	—	✓	—	
Starting pitcher	John Rooney	Hofstra	1	✓	—	—	—	—	—	
Starting pitcher	Nick Sandlin	Southern Miss	6	✓	✓	✓	✓	✓	✓	
Starting pitcher	Brady Singer	Florida	6	✓	✓	✓	✓	✓	✓	Dick Howser Trophy ABCA Pitcher of the Year Baseball America Player of the Year
Relief pitcher	Michael Byrne	Florida	4	—	✓	—	✓	✓	✓	Stopper of the Year
Relief pitcher	Nolan Hoffman	Texas A&M	1	—	—	—	—	✓	—	
Relief pitcher	Seth Kinker	Ohio State	1	—	—	—	—	✓	—	
Relief pitcher	Jack Little	Stanford	5	✓	✓	—	✓	✓	✓	
Relief pitcher	Chris Mauloni	Jacksonville	1	—	—	—	—	✓	—	
Catcher	Joey Bart	Georgia Tech	5	✓	✓	✓	—	✓	✓	Johnny Bench Award
Catcher	Adley Rutschman	Oregon State	2	✓	—	—	✓	—	—	
First baseman / DH	Bren Spillane	Illinois	6	✓	✓	✓	✓	✓	✓	Collegiate Baseball Player of the Year
First baseman / DH	Andrew Vaughn	California	5	✓	✓	—	✓	✓	✓	Golden Spikes Award ABCA Position Player of the Year
Second baseman	Kody Clemens	Texas	6	✓	✓	✓	✓	✓	✓	ABCA Position Player of the Year
Shortstop	Greg Cullen	Niagara	1	✓	—	—	—	—	—	
Shortstop	Nick Grande	Stony Brook	1	—	—	✓	—	—	—	
Shortstop	Seth Lancaster	Coastal Carolina	1	—	—	—	—	—	✓	
Shortstop	Terrin Vavra	Minnesota	4	✓	✓	—	✓	✓	—	
Third baseman	Jonathan India	Florida	5	✓	✓	—	✓	✓	✓	
Third baseman	Luke Reynolds	Southern Miss	1	—	—	✓	—	—	—	
Outfielder	Seth Beer	Clemson	5	✓	✓	✓	✓	✓	—	
Outfielder	Gage Canning	Arizona State	1	—	—	✓	—	—	—	
Outfielder	Devlin Granberg	Dallas Baptist	5	✓	—	✓	✓	✓	✓	
Outfielder	Trevor Larnach	Oregon State	5	✓	✓	—	✓	✓	✓	
Outfielder	Andrew Moritz	UNC Greensboro	1	✓	—	—	—	—	—	
Outfielder	Bryant Packard	East Carolina	4	✓	✓	—	—	✓	✓	
Designated hitter	Kevin Strohschein	Tennessee Tech	3	✓	—	✓	—	✓	—	
Utility player	Jordan Qsar	Pepperdine	1	—	—	✓	—	—	—	
Utility player	Brooks Wilson	Stetson	6	✓	✓	✓	✓	✓	✓	John Olerud Award

== See also ==
- List of college baseball awards
