= Dave Van Horn =

American baseball coach

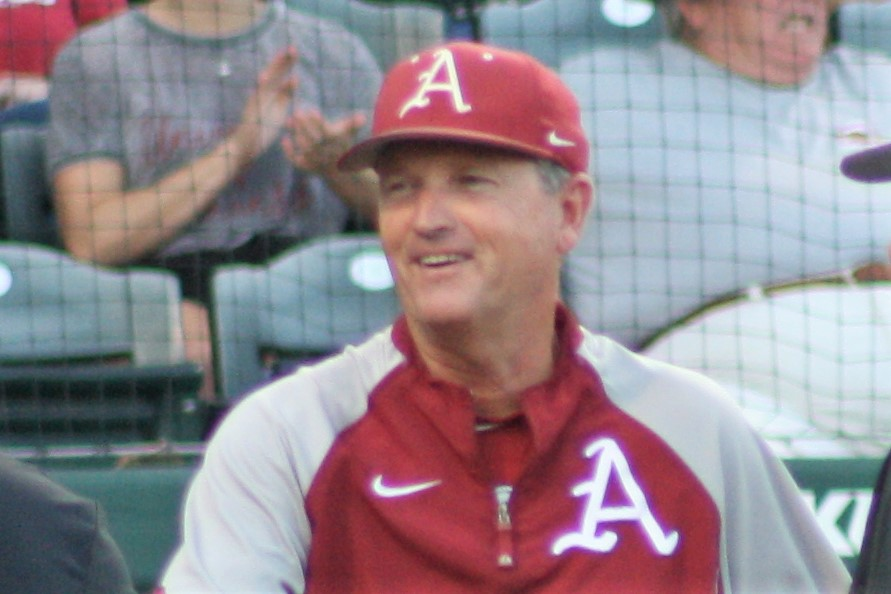
- Van Horn in 2018

Current position
- Title: Head coach
- Team: Arkansas
- Conference: SEC
- Record: 974–494 (.664)
- Annual salary: $2.1 million

Biographical details
- Born: September 17, 1960 (age 66); Stanton, California, U.S.

Playing career
- 1980–1981: McLennan CC
- 1982: Arkansas
- Position: Infielder

Coaching career (HC unless noted)
- 1985–1988: Arkansas (GA)
- 1989–1993: Texarkana
- 1994: Central Missouri State
- 1995–1997: Northwestern State
- 1998–2002: Nebraska
- 2003–present: Arkansas

Head coaching record
- Overall: 1,345–662 (NCAA) (.670); 214–72 (NJCAA) (.748)

Accomplishments and honors

Championships
- NCAA Division II National Champions (1994); MIAA Conference regular season (1994); Texas Eastern (1992); Southland regular season (1995); Southland Louisiana Division (1997); Big 12 regular season (2001); 3× Big 12 Tournament (1999–2001); 3x SEC regular season (2004, 2021, 2023); SEC Tournament (2021); 8× SEC Western Division (2004, 2007, 2011, 2018, 2019, 2021, 2023, 2024); 13x Regional Championships; 10x Super Regional Championships; 10 College World Series Appearances; College World Series runner-up (2018)

Awards
- 3x SEC Coach of the Year: 2004, 2021, 2023; Baseball America National Coach of the Year: 2001; Big 12 Coach of the Year: 2001; 2x ABCA Midwest Region Coach of the Year: 2000, 2001; 2x Southland Coach of the Year: 1995, 1997; NCAA Division II National Coach of the Year: 1994; ABCA Central Region Coach of the Year: 1994; All-Southwest Conference, infielder, 1982; Southwest Conference Newcomer of the Year, 1982

David Kevin Van Horn (born September 17, 1960) is an American college baseball coach and former infielder, who is the head baseball coach of the Arkansas Razorbacks. Van Horn won a Division II national title in 1994 while he was the head coach at Central Missouri.

== Playing career ==
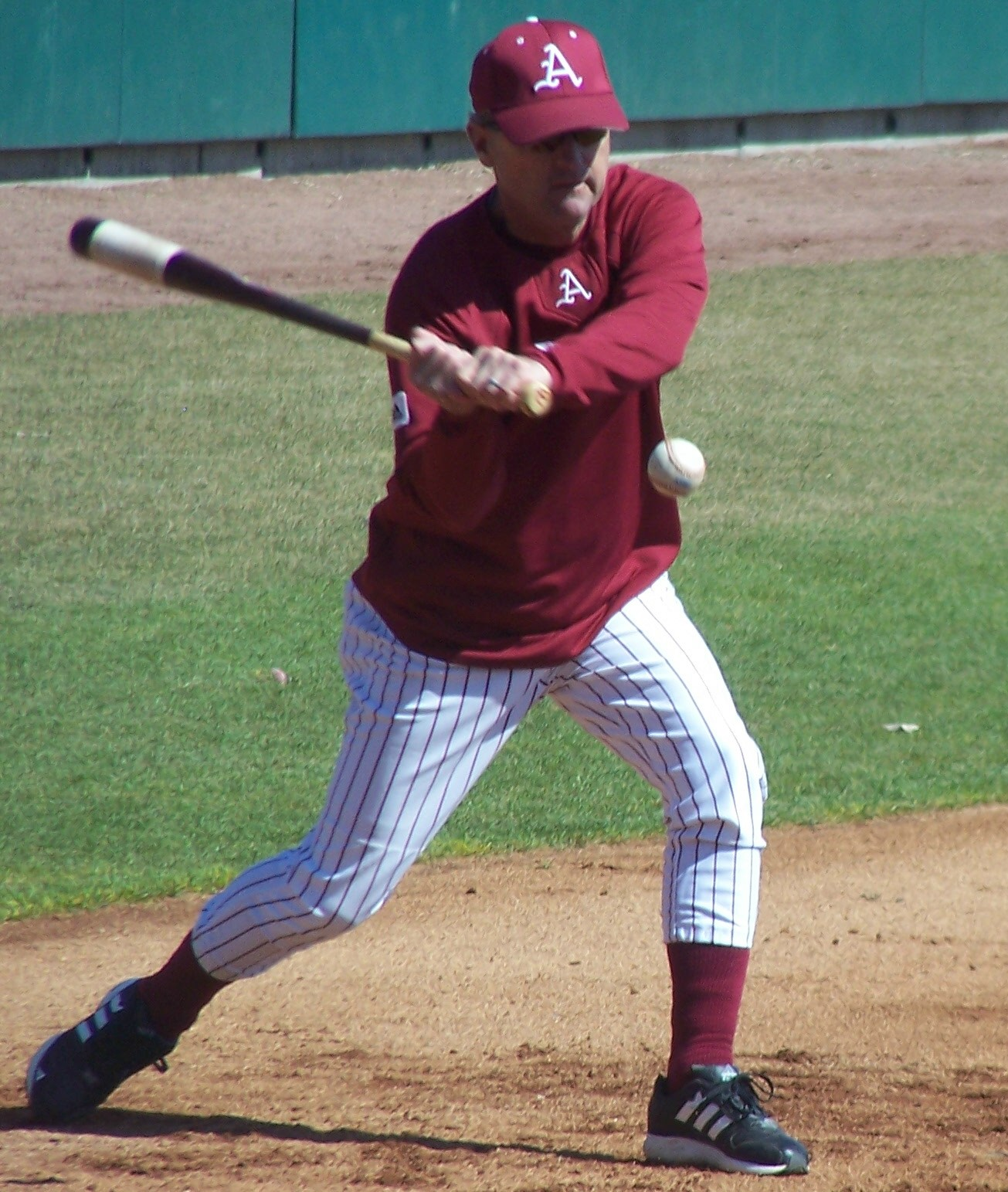
Dave Van Horn during warmups with the Arkansas Razorbacks.

Born in Stanton, California, Van Horn graduated from Winnetonka High School in Kansas City, Missouri in 1979. He then played junior college baseball at McLennan Community College in Texas for two years, earning all-conference and all-region honors as a freshman, while helping the Highlanders finish third in the JUCO World Series. His next season brought more individual and team success, as the team finished eighth in the nation and Van Horn earned All American and Region 5 Player of the Year accolades. Turning down the Chicago White Sox, who drafted him, he transferred to Arkansas for the 1982 season.

As a Razorback, Van Horn would earn All-Southwest Conference and SWC Newcomer of the Year awards for his performance. He was also recognized as team MVP. The Atlanta Braves selected Van Horn in the 10th round, where he would spend his next three years in the minor leagues.

== Family ==
Coach Van Horn met his wife, the former Karen Lee, while serving as a graduate assistant at Arkansas. The couple has two daughters, Hollan and Mariel, along with four grandchildren.

== Alma mater ==
- Arkansas, 1988
- Masters of Science, East Texas State University (in Commerce, Texas), 1992

== Team accomplishments ==
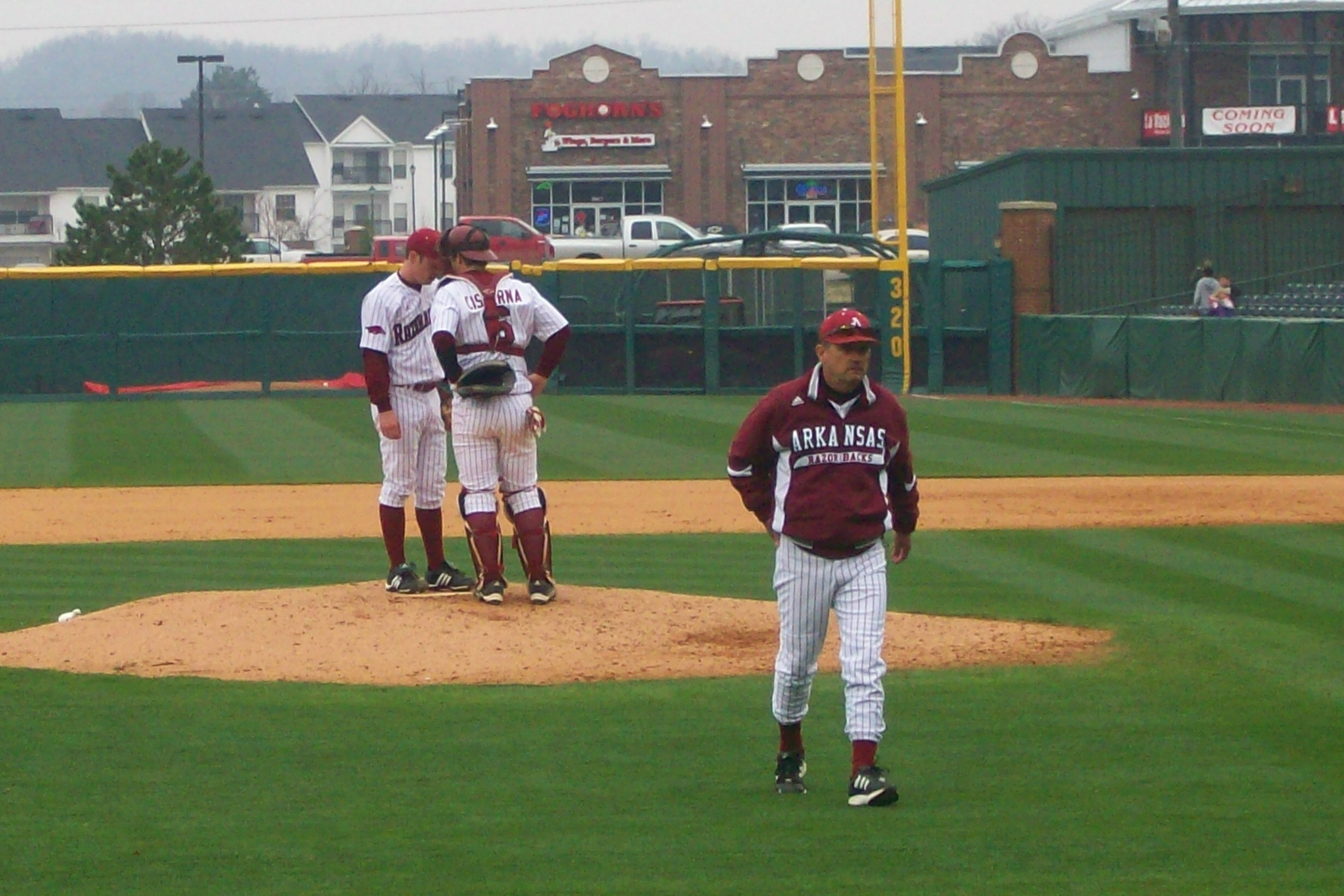
Dave van Horn departs the field after a 2009 mound visit in Baum Stadium.

Dave Van Horn's first collegiate head coaching job was in 1994 for the Central Missouri State Mules, now called the University of Central Missouri. Van Horn coached that team (51–11 record) to their first NCAA Division II national championship, in the Division II College World Series.

Van Horn's subsequent teams have had plenty of success as well, reaching the College World Series ten times, eight occurring at Arkansas (2004, 2009, 2012, 2015, 2018, 2019, 2022, 2025), the other two during his tenure at Nebraska (2001 and 2002). As a graduate assistant at Arkansas he has reached the CWS twice more, in 1985 and 1987. Coach Van Horn also led 17 straight teams to the NCAA tournament, from 1999 to 2015.

Arkansas reached the SEC Tournament every year under Van Horn as head coach from 2003 to 2007 and again in 2009. The 2008 team did not qualify for the SEC Tournament but qualified for the NCAA tournament.

- On April 5, 2015, Van Horn won his 500th game as the Arkansas head coach.
- On March 11, 2020, Van Horn won his 700th game as the Arkansas head coach.
- On March 15, 2025, Van Horn won his 900th game as the Arkansas head coach.

=== 2009 ===
Arkansas went 34–22 in 2009, and set University records for single-game attendance (11,434) total season attendance, (269,216) and actual attendance (173,946). Despite beating #1 Arizona State twice, the Hogs faltered at the end of the season, losing their final eight SEC games.

==== 2009 College World Series ====
Arkansas returned to Omaha in 2009. The team won the Norman regional by knocking off top-eight seed Oklahoma. The Hogs next defeated Florida State twice at Dick Howser Stadium to punch their ticket to the College World Series. The Razorbacks were not expected to do well at the Series, but defeated the favored Cal State Fullerton Titans. Next, the Hogs were defeated by LSU, but staved off elimination the next day by beating Virginia in twelve innings. The Hogs were eliminated by eventual national champion LSU in game 11.

=== 2012 ===
Arkansas went 46–22 in 2012, which was the most wins in the Van Horn era and the most for a Razorback team since 1990, but limped into the postseason at the Houston Regional having lost both games it played at the SEC Tournament. Once it got in, it defeated Rice and then defeated Baylor at the Waco Super Regional to advance to the College World Series.

==== 2012 College World Series ====
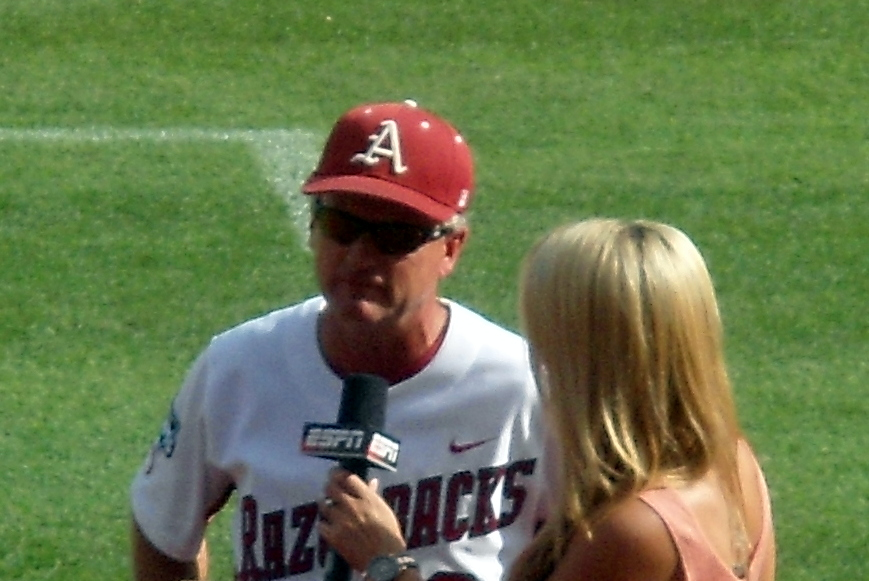
Van Horn participating in an interview during the 2012 College World Series

Arkansas won its first game in Omaha, defeating Kent State 8–1. The Razorbacks then ended South Carolina's 22-game postseason win streak with a 2–1 victory. The Gamecocks got them back though, winning 2–0 and 3–2 in the next two games to advance to the final, only to lose to upstart Arizona in the best-of-three championship series.

=== 2015 ===
After an extremely slow start to the 2015 campaign, where the Razorbacks were .500 going into April, Van Horn rallied the troops and the team responded by winning seven of its last eight SEC series and finished fifth overall in the SEC, and third in the West behind No. 2 national seed LSU and Texas A&M. Arkansas won the Stillwater Regional by defeating Oral Roberts, host Oklahoma State and St. John's in succession. The Razorbacks then caught a break by getting to host the Fayetteville Super Regional at Baum Stadium because Missouri State, the No. 8 national seed, couldn't host because it shares Hammons Field with the Springfield Cardinals. It took all three games of the best-of-3 series, but Arkansas defeated the Bears to clinch Van Horn's sixth trip to Omaha overall and fourth with the Razorbacks, tying him with former coach Norm DeBriyn.

==== 2015 College World Series ====
Arkansas lost both games it played in Omaha in 2015, which was the first time since 2004 that the Razorbacks did not win a game there. They fell to Virginia in the CWS opener, 5–3, and then fell to Miami in an elimination game, 4–3.

=== 2018 ===
The Razorbacks came into the 2018 season with enormous expectations, and they lived up to those expectations. Arkansas earned a share of the SEC Western Division title with Ole Miss, and secured the No. 5 overall national seed in the NCAA tournament.

Arkansas hosted a regional at Baum Stadium, dispatching Oral Roberts, Southern Miss and Dallas Baptist in consecutive games in the Fayetteville Regional to advance to the Super Regional, also in Fayetteville, with SEC foe South Carolina. The 3-game series went the distance before the Razorbacks defeated the Gamecocks to clinch its fifth trip to Omaha of Van Horn's tenure, and ninth in program history, with a 14–4 victory on June 11.

==== 2018 College World Series ====
Arkansas won its opening game in Omaha against former Southwest Conference rival Texas, 11–5. The game was delayed by weather in the sixth inning for nearly three hours.

Arkansas then defeated another former SWC foe in Texas Tech, upending the Red Raiders 7–4. This game was delayed by inclement weather twice. Originally scheduled for 7 p.m. on June 19, the game was rescheduled for 11 a.m. on June 20. Thunderstorms delayed the game further, and was finally played at 2:30 p.m. that afternoon.

Arkansas defeated Florida in an elimination game for the Gators to earn a trip to the CWS finals against the Oregon State Beavers. The Razorbacks took game 1 of the series after it was delayed a day by weather, 4–1.

The Razorbacks were on the verge of securing their first baseball national championship but misplayed a foul ball with two outs in the 9th inning of Game 2, which would have ended the series and given Arkansas the title. It left the door open and the Beavers won the game and won the rubber game the following evening, forcing Arkansas to settle for a national runner-up finish.

=== 2021 ===
After seeing the previous season be cut short because of COVID-19 after just 16 games, Arkansas went into the 2021 season with high expectations, looking to make its third consecutive trip to Omaha.

The Razorbacks spent most of the campaign ranked No. 1, and ended up winning the SEC title outright for the first time since 1999 and won the SEC Tournament for the first time under Van Horn.

It was also the first time since 1989 that the team won 50 games and the fourth time in school history. Arkansas hosted a regional and defeated NJIT and Nebraska twice to advance to the Super Regional, before succumbing to NC State in three games to not make the College World Series for the first time since 2017.

=== 2022 ===
Arkansas spent much of the season ranked in the top five, eager to follow up on a terrific 2021 campaign. A late season swoon kept them from hosting a regional for the first time since 2015.

The team went to Stillwater again, dispatching Grand Canyon and #7 national seed Oklahoma State twice to advance to the super regional, where the Razorbacks had to travel to Chapel Hill. Arkansas upended the #10 national seed Tar Heels in two games to secure Van Horn's seventh trip to Omaha as the Hog boss and ninth overall.

==== 2022 College World Series ====
Arkansas opened its Omaha slate by walloping #2 national seeded Stanford 17–2, the highest victory margin for a Razorback team in the College World Series and tallied 21 hits, an Omaha record.

The Razorbacks dropped their next game to Ole Miss, and had to win an elimination game against division rival Auburn to play Ole Miss again. Arkansas beat the Rebels on Wednesday, June 22, but had to do it twice to advance to the championship series, and the following day Ole Miss' Dylan DeLucia threw a complete-game shutout to end Arkansas' season. The defeat marked another failed attempt ln Van Horn's National Championship pursuit, as he now has the most CWS appearances among active head coaches (9) along with Kevin O’Sullivan of Florida.

=== 2024 ===
Arkansas failed to advance out of an NCAA regional for the second consecutive season. A shocking defeat to Southeast Missouri State in the 2024 Fayetteville Regional put a damper on an otherwise sterling campaign.

=== 2025 ===
Arkansas briefly spent a week ranked No. 1, and would go on to finish their season 43–12, and 20–10 in SEC-play. The Razorbacks enjoyed a home sweep of then-#1 Texas on the May 1–3 weekend, as well as sweeps over South Carolina, Missouri, and at Vanderbilt. Arkansas ended the regular season beating Tennessee 2 games to 1 at Baum-Walker Stadium. Although they lost to Ole Miss in their first game in the SEC Tournament, Arkansas was tabbed as the No. 3 overall seed in the NCAA Tournament and hosted a Regional. The Razorbacks defeated North Dakota State once and Creighton twice to win the Fayetteville Regional championship, Van Horn's 10th as head coach of Arkansas. The Hogs then hosted Tennessee for a Super Regional, and Arkansas would sweep the Vols, winning Game One 4-3 and Game Two 11–4, to win the Fayetteville Super Regional championship, earning a spot in the 2025 College World Series. It is Van Horn's 8th trip to Omaha at Arkansas.

==== 2025 College World Series ====
Arkansas lost game one to the LSU Tigers 4–1 on Saturday, June 14. On June 16, the Razorbacks defeated Murray State 3–0, as pitcher Gage Wood threw a no hitter with 19 strikeouts. It was only the third no hitter in CWS history, and the first since 1960. On June 17, Arkansas defeated UCLA 7–3, and advanced to the CWS semifinals versus LSU. Arkansas was subsequently eliminated in the next game against LSU, 6–5, on a walk off hit after Arkansas had just taken a 5–3 lead in the top of the 9th.

== Head coaching record ==
Record table
Season	Team	Overall	Conference	Standing	Postseason
Texarkana Bulldogs (Texas Eastern Conference) (1989–1993)
1989	Texarkana CC	39–18			
1990	Texarkana CC	44–14			
1991	Texarkana CC	45–12			
1992	Texarkana CC	48–10		1st	
1993	Texarkana CC	38–18			
Texarkana CC:		214–72 (NJCAA)			
Central Missouri State Mules (Mid-America Intercollegiate Athletics Association) (1994)
1994	Central Missouri State	51–11	15–1	1st	NCAA Division II National Champions
Central Missouri State:		51–11	15–1		
Northwestern State Demons (Southland Conference) (1995–1997)
1995	Northwestern State	37–15	19–5	1st	
1996	Northwestern State	34–27	14–16	2nd (Louisiana)	
1997	Northwestern State	35–23	19–9	1st (Louisiana)	
Northwestern State:		106–65	52–30		
Nebraska Cornhuskers (Big 12 Conference) (1998–2002)
1998	Nebraska	24–20	10–13	7th	
1999	Nebraska	42–18	16–9	5th	Columbus Regional
2000	Nebraska	51–17	21–9	2nd	Palo Alto Super Regional
2001	Nebraska	50–16	20–8	1st	College World Series
2002	Nebraska	47–21	16–11	T–2nd	College World Series
Nebraska:		214–92	67–39		
Arkansas Razorbacks (Southeastern Conference) (2003–present)
2003	Arkansas	35–22	14–16	T–5th (West)	Austin Regional
2004	Arkansas	45–24	19–11	1st (West)	College World Series
2005	Arkansas	39–22	13–17	T–5th (West)	Austin Regional
2006	Arkansas	39–21	18–12	2nd (West)	Fayetteville Regional
2007	Arkansas	43–21	18–12	1st (West)	Fayetteville Regional
2008	Arkansas	34–24	14–15	4th (West)	Palo Alto Regional
2009	Arkansas	41–24	14–15	4th (West)	College World Series
2010	Arkansas	43–21	18–12	2nd (West)	Tempe Super Regional
2011	Arkansas	40–22	15–15	1st (West)	Tempe Regional
2012	Arkansas	46–22	16–14	T–2nd (West)	College World Series
2013	Arkansas	39–22	18–11	2nd (West)	Manhattan Regional
2014	Arkansas	40–25	16–14	4th (West)	Charlottesville Regional
2015	Arkansas	40–25	17–12	3rd (West)	College World Series
2016	Arkansas	26–29	7–23	7th (West)	
2017	Arkansas	45–19	18–11	2nd (West)	Fayetteville Regional
2018	Arkansas	48–21	18–12	T–1st (West)	College World Series Runner-Up
2019	Arkansas	46–20	20–10	T–1st (West)	College World Series
2020	Arkansas	11–5	0–0	(West)	Season canceled due to COVID-19
2021	Arkansas	50–13	22–8	1st (West)	Fayetteville Super Regional
2022	Arkansas	46–21	18–12	2nd (West)	College World Series
2023	Arkansas	43–18	20–10	1st (West)	Fayetteville Regional
2024	Arkansas	44–16	20–10	1st (West)	Fayetteville Regional
2025	Arkansas	50–15	20–10	2nd	College World Series
2026	Arkansas	41–22	17–13	T–6th	Lawrence Regional
Arkansas:		974–494	390–295		
Total:		1,345–662 (NCAA)			
National champion Postseason invitational champion Conference regular season champion Conference regular season and conference tournament champion Division regular season champion Division regular season and conference tournament champion Conference tournament champion

== See also ==
- List of college baseball career coaching wins leaders
