= 2018 Arkansas Razorbacks baseball team =

American college baseball season

2018 Arkansas Razorbacks baseball
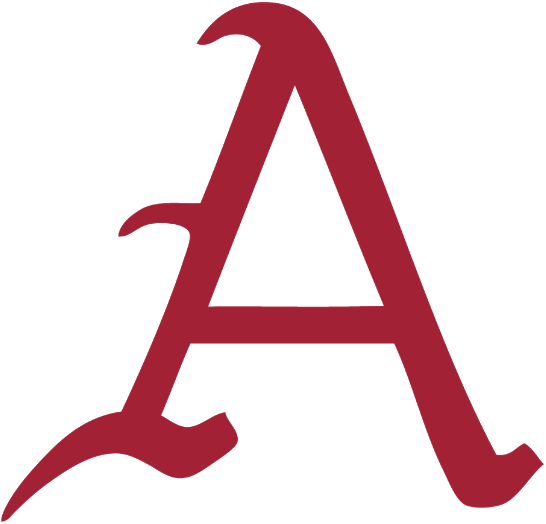

SEC Western Division co-champions Fayetteville Regional champions Fayetteville Super Regional champions

College World Series, Runner-Up
- Conference: Southeastern Conference
- Western Division
- CB: No. 4
- Record: 48–21 (18–12 SEC)
- Head coach: Dave Van Horn
- Pitching coach: Wes Johnson
- Home stadium: Baum Stadium

2018 Southeastern Conference baseball standings
	Conf.				Overall
Team	W		L	PCT	W		L	PCT
East Division
No. 3 Florida ^{x}‍†‍‍^{y}	20	–	10	.667	49	–	21	.700
No. 20 Georgia ‍‍‍^{y}	18	–	12	.600	39	–	21	.650
No. 12 South Carolina ‍‍‍^{y}	17	–	13	.567	37	–	26	.587
No. 16 Vanderbilt ‍‍‍^{y}	16	–	14	.533	35	–	27	.565
Kentucky ‍‍‍	13	–	17	.433	34	–	22	.607
Missouri ‍‍‍	12	–	18	.400	34	–	22	.607
Tennessee ‍‍‍	12	–	18	.400	29	–	27	.518
West Division
No. 19 Ole Miss ^{x}‍‍‡‍^{y}	18	–	12	.600	48	–	18	.727
No. 2 Arkansas ^{x}‍‍‍^{y}	18	–	12	.600	48	–	21	.696
No. 15 Auburn ‍‍‍^{y}	15	–	15	.500	43	–	23	.652
LSU ‍‍‍^{y}	15	–	15	.500	39	–	27	.591
No. 4 Mississippi State ‍‍‍^{y}	15	–	15	.500	39	–	29	.574
Texas A&M ‍‍‍^{y}	13	–	17	.433	40	–	22	.645
Alabama ‍‍‍	8	–	22	.267	27	–	29	.482
x – Division champion † – Conference champion ‡ – Tournament champion y – Invited to the NCAA tournament Rankings from Collegiate Baseball

The 2018 Arkansas Razorbacks baseball team (variously the OmaHogs or the Diamond Hogs) represented the University of Arkansas in baseball at the Division I level in the NCAA for the 2018 NCAA Division I baseball season. They played their home games at Baum Stadium and are coached by Dave van Horn. They finished as the national runner-up after falling to Oregon State in three games at the 2018 College World Series.

== Roster ==
2018 Arkansas Razorbacks baseball team
Players
Coaches

#	Pos.	Name	B/T	Height	Weight	Year	Home town
3	INF	Jared Gates	L/R	6 ft 0 in (1.83 m)	205 lb (93 kg)	Sr	Wichita, KS
4	INF	Bryce Bonnin	R/R	6 ft 1 in (1.85 m)	190 lb (86 kg)	Fr	Mont Belvieu, TX
5	INF	Jacob Nesbit	R/R	6 ft 0 in (1.83 m)	174 lb (79 kg)	Fr	Coppell, TX
6	INF	Hunter Wilson	L/R	5 ft 10 in (1.78 m)	173 lb (78 kg)	RS Jr	Spiro, OK
7	INF	Jack Kenley	L/R	6 ft 0 in (1.83 m)	185 lb (84 kg)	So	Germantown, TN
8	OF	Eric Cole	S/R	5 ft 11 in (1.8 m)	195 lb (88 kg)	Jr	Southlake, TX
9	INF	Jax Biggers	L/R	5 ft 11 in (1.8 m)	180 lb (82 kg)	Jr	Missouri City, TX
10	INF	Easton Murrell	S/R	6 ft 0 in (1.83 m)	195 lb (88 kg)	Fr	Prosper, TX
11	P	Keaton McKinney	R/R	6 ft 5 in (1.96 m)	235 lb (107 kg)	RS Jr	Ankeny, IA
12	C	Casey Opitz	S/R	5 ft 11 in (1.8 m)	174 lb (79 kg)	Fr	Centennial, CO
13	INF	Jordan McFarland	R/R	6 ft 3 in (1.91 m)	225 lb (102 kg)	So	Waterloo, IL
14	OF	Cole Turney	L/L	6 ft 0 in (1.83 m)	222 lb (101 kg)	Fr	Richmond, TX
15	INF	Casey Martin	R/R	5 ft 11 in (1.8 m)	179 lb (81 kg)	Fr	Lonoke, AR
16	P	Blaine Knight	R/R	6 ft 3 in (1.91 m)	170 lb (77 kg)	Jr	Bryant, AR
17	OF	Luke Bonfield	R/R	6 ft 3 in (1.91 m)	205 lb (93 kg)	Sr	Skillman, NJ
18	OF	Heston Kjerstad	L/R	6 ft 3 in (1.91 m)	203 lb (92 kg)	Fr	Amarillo, TX
19	C	Brady Disher	L/R	6 ft 1 in (1.85 m)	195 lb (88 kg)	Fr	Trophy Club, TX
20	INF	Carson Shaddy	R/R	5 ft 11 in (1.8 m)	185 lb (84 kg)	RS Sr	Fayetteville, AR
21	P	Kacey Murphy	L/L	6 ft 0 in (1.83 m)	200 lb (91 kg)	Jr	Rogers, AR
22	OF	Ben McClain	L/L	5 ft 10 in (1.78 m)	199 lb (90 kg)	Fr	Lee's Summit, MO
24	OF	Dominic Fletcher	L/L	5 ft 9 in (1.75 m)	188 lb (85 kg)	So	Cypress, CA
26	INF	Ryan Drake	R/R	6 ft 4 in (1.93 m)	190 lb (86 kg)	Fr	Grapevine, TX
27	P	Evan Lee	L/L	6 ft 2 in (1.88 m)	200 lb (91 kg)	So	Bryant, AR
28	P	Kole Ramage	R/R	6 ft 1 in (1.85 m)	186 lb (84 kg)	Fr	Southlake, TX
29	P	Angus Denton	R/R	5 ft 11 in (1.8 m)	165 lb (75 kg)	So	Beebe, AR
31	P	Caleb Bolden	R/R	6 ft 2 in (1.88 m)	188 lb (85 kg)	Fr	Texarkana, TX
32	P	Matt Cronin	L/L	6 ft 2 in (1.88 m)	197 lb (89 kg)	So	Navarre, FL
33	C	Grant Koch	R/R	6 ft 0 in (1.83 m)	206 lb (93 kg)	Jr	Fayetteville, AR
34	P	Jake Reindl	R/R	6 ft 1 in (1.85 m)	200 lb (91 kg)	Jr	Fayetteville, AR
35	P	Jacob Kostyshock	R/R	6 ft 4 in (1.93 m)	172 lb (78 kg)	So	O'Fallon, MO
37	P	Weston Rogers	L/L	6 ft 4 in (1.93 m)	218 lb (99 kg)	Jr	Springdale, AR
44	INF	Derek Ripp	L/R	6 ft 6 in (1.98 m)	225 lb (102 kg)	Fr	Olathe, KS
45	P	Kevin Kopps	R/R	6 ft 0 in (1.83 m)	205 lb (93 kg)	RS So	Sugar Land, TX
46	P	Barrett Loseke	R/R	6 ft 0 in (1.83 m)	175 lb (79 kg)	Jr	Tulsa, OK
47	P	Hunter Milligan	L/L	6 ft 4 in (1.93 m)	215 lb (98 kg)	Fr	Greenbrier, AR
48	C	Zack Plunkett	R/R	6 ft 2 in (1.88 m)	225 lb (102 kg)	RS Jr	Hurst, TX
55	P	Isaiah Campbell	R/R	6 ft 4 in (1.93 m)	225 lb (102 kg)	RS So	Olathe, KS
57	P	Cody Scroggins	R/R	6 ft 0 in (1.83 m)	190 lb (86 kg)	RS So	Bentonville, AR
88	P	Zebulon Vermillion	L/R	6 ft 4 in (1.93 m)	208 lb (94 kg)	Fr	Prairie Village, KS
99	P	Jackson Rutledge	R/R	6 ft 8 in (2.03 m)	258 lb (117 kg)	Fr	St. Louis, MO

Head coach

- Dave Van Horn
  (16th season; Arkansas '88)

Assistant coach(es)

- Nate Thompson
  Assistant coach
- Wes Johnson
  Pitching coach
- Colby Suggs
  Bullpen coach
- Craig Parry
  Volunteer assistant coach
- Clay Goodwin
  Dir. of baseball operations

Legend

- (C) Team captain
- (S) Suspended
- (I) Ineligible
- Injured
- Current redshirt

Roster
Last update: June 25, 2018

== Schedule and results ==
Legend
	Arkansas win
	Arkansas loss
**Bold**	Arkansas team member

2018 Arkansas Razorbacks baseball game log
Regular season
February: 6–2 (4–0 home; 2–2 neutral)

Date	Opponent	Rank	Site/stadium	Score	Win	Loss	Save	Attendance	Overall record	SEC record
Feb. 16	Bucknell*	#3	Baum Stadium; Fayetteville, Arkansas	**W** 14–2	**B. Knight** (1–0)	Van Hoose (0–1)		7,389	1–0	
Feb. 17	Bucknell*	#3	Baum Stadium	**W** 32–4	**I. Campbell** (1–0)	Grabek (0–1)		7,862	2–0	
Feb. 18	Bucknell*	#3	Baum Stadium	**W** 3–1	**M. Cronin** (1–0)	Simpson (0–1)	**J. Reindl** (1)	7,954	3–0	
Feb. 21	vs Arizona*	#3	Tony Gwynn Stadium; San Diego, California	**W** 1–0	**K. Murphy** (1–0)	Labaut (0–1)	**M. Cronin** (1)	315	4–0	
Feb. 23	vs Cal Poly*†	#3	Tony Gwynn Stadium	**L** 3–4	Alvarez (1–0)	**J. Reindl** (0–1)		450	4–1	
Feb. 24	vs San Diego State*†	#3	Tony Gwynn Stadium	**W** 5–2	**M. Cronin** (2–0)	Ritcheson (0–1)		1,532	5–1	
Feb. 25	vs San Diego*†	#3	Tony Gwynn Stadium	**L** 6–7	Donatella (1–0)	**E. Lee** (0–1)	Friedman (1)	675	5–2	
Feb. 28	Dayton*	#15	Baum Stadium	**W** 18–1	**C. Bolden** (1–0)	Wagner (0–1)		6,897	6–2	

March: 13–7 (10–2 home; 3–5 away)

Date	Opponent	Rank	Site/stadium	Score	Win	Loss	Save	Attendance	Overall record	SEC record
Mar. 1	Dayton*	#15	Baum Stadium	**W** 11–0	**B. Bonnin** (1–0)	Cline (0–3)		6,836	7–2	
Mar. 2	USC*	#15	Baum Stadium	**W** 4–0	**B. Knight** (2–0)	Clarke (1–2)	**J. Rutledge** (1)	8,142	8–2	
Mar. 3	USC*	#15	Baum Stadium	**L** 1–3	Longrie (2–0)	**I. Campbell** (1–1)	Lunn (5)	13,472	8–3	
Mar. 4	USC*	#15	Baum Stadium	**W** 7–6 ^{8}	**J. Rutledge** (1–0)	Lunn (0–1)		7,388	9–3	
Mar. 9	Kent State*	#15	Baum Stadium	**W** 7–2	**B. Knight** (3–0)	Kraus (1–2)		DH	10–3	
Mar. 9	Kent State*	#15	Baum Stadium	**L** 4–10	Havekost (1–0)	**I. Campbell** (1–2)		8,924	10–4	
Mar. 11	Kent State*	#15	Baum Stadium	**W** 11–4	**E. Lee** (1–1)	Schultz (1–2)		3,049	11–4	
Mar. 13	Texas*	#18	Baum Stadium	**W** 13–4	**K. Murphy** (2–0)	Ridgeway (1–1)		8,051	12–4	
Mar. 14	Texas*	#18	Baum Stadium	**W** 7–5	**C. Bolden** (2–0)	O'Donnell (1–1)	**M. Cronin** (2)	8,007	13–4	
Mar. 16	#8 Kentucky	#18	Baum Stadium	**W** 9–4	**J. Reindl** (1–1)	Hjelle (4–1)	**M. Cronin** (3)	8,751	14–4	1–0
Mar. 17	#8 Kentucky	#18	Baum Stadium	**W** 14–2	**I. Campbell** (2–2)	Lewis (3–2)		DH	15–4	2–0
Mar. 17	#8 Kentucky	#18	Baum Stadium	**W** 16–9	**K. Murphy** (3–0)	Harper (1–1)		10,418	16–4	3–0
Mar. 20	vs Charlotte*	#7	BB&T Ballpark; Charlotte, North Carolina		Cancelled					
Mar. 21	at Charlotte*	#7	Hayes Stadium; Charlotte, North Carolina	**L** 3–6	Bruce (2–0)	**K. Ramage** (0–1)	Patten (2)	815	16–5	
Mar. 23	at #4 Florida	#7	McKethan Stadium; Gainesville, Florida	**W** 6–3	**B. Knight** (4–0)	Singer (5–1)	**M. Cronin** (4)	5,025	17–5	4–0
Mar. 24	at #4 Florida	#7	McKethan Stadium	**L** 2–17	Kowar (4–1)	**I. Campbell** (2–3)		4,815	17–6	4–1
Mar. 25	at #4 Florida	#7	McKethan Stadium	**L** 4–5	Byrne (1–0)	**K. Murphy** (3–1)		4,510	17–7	4–2
Mar. 27	at Memphis*	#14	FedExPark; Memphis, Tennessee	**W** 8–7	**J. Rutledge** (2–0)	Smith (1–1)		2,995	18–7	
Mar. 29	at #7 Ole Miss	#14	Swayze Field; Oxford, Mississippi	**W** 6–4	**B. Knight** (5–0)	Rolison (3–3)	**M. Cronin** (5)	9,619	19–7	5–2
Mar. 30	at #7 Ole Miss	#14	Swayze Field	**L** 4–5	Feigl (6–1)	**E. Lee** (1–2)	Caracci (5)	10,648	19–8	5–3
Mar. 31	at #7 Ole Miss	#14	Swayze Field	**L** 10–11	McArthur (4–0)	**K. Murphy** (3–2)	Caracci (6)	11,146	19–9	5–4

April: 13–4 (12–1 home; 0–3 away; 1–0 neutral)

Date	Opponent	Rank	Site/stadium	Score	Win	Loss	Save	Attendance	Overall record	SEC record
Apr. 3	UL–Monroe*	#14	Baum Stadium	**W** 10–9 ^{10}	**E. Lee** (2–2)	Curtis (2–1)		6,682	20–9	
Apr. 4	UL–Monroe*	#14	Baum Stadium	**W** 4–0	**C. Bolden** (3–0)	Hebert (2–2)		6,963	21–9	
Apr. 6	Auburn	#14	Baum Stadium	**W** 2–1	**B. Knight** (6–0)	Mize (6–1)	**M. Cronin** (6)	8,609	22–9	6–4
Apr. 7	Auburn	#14	Baum Stadium	**W** 13–2	**K. Murphy** (4–2)	Daniel (2–2)		9,817	23–9	7–4
Apr. 8	Auburn	#14	Baum Stadium	**W** 5–4	**J. Reindl** (2–1)	Greenhill (1–1)		7,530	24–9	8–4
Apr. 10	vs Grambling State*	#7	Dickey-Stephens Park; North Little Rock, Arkansas	**W** 7–6	**J. Rutledge** (3–0)	Baduel (2–2)	**M. Cronin** (7)	8,719	25–9	
Apr. 12	South Carolina	#7	Baum Stadium	**L** 2–3	Bridges (2–0)	**B. Loseke** (0–1)	Demurias (3)	8,416	25–10	8–5
Apr. 14	South Carolina	#7	Baum Stadium	**W** 2–0 ^{7}	**K. Murphy** (5–2)	Hill (3–4)	**M. Cronin** (8)	DH	26–10	9–5
Apr. 14	South Carolina	#7	Baum Stadium	**W** 3–0 ^{7}	**I. Campbell** (3–3)	Morris (6–3)	**M. Cronin** (9)	9,680	27–10	10–5
Apr. 17	Missouri State*	#6	Baum Stadium	**W** 11–7	**K. Ramage** (1–1)	Fromson (2–2)	**J. Reindl** (2)	7,983	28–10	
Apr. 20	at Mississippi State	#6	Dudy Noble Field; Starkville, Mississippi	**L** 5–6	France (2–1)	**M. Cronin** (2–1)		7,303	28–11	10–6
Apr. 21	at Mississippi State	#6	Dudy Noble Field	**L** 3–5	Small (4–3)	**K. Murphy** (5–3)	Smith (3)	DH	28–12	10–7
Apr. 21	at Mississippi State	#6	Dudy Noble Field	**L** 5–7	Billingsley (3–2)	**I. Campbell** (3–4)	Neff (1)	10,147	28–13	10–8
Apr. 24	#11 Texas Tech*	#10	Baum Stadium	**W** 5–1	**E. Lee** (3–2)	Sublette (0–2)	**B. Loseke** (1)	8,455	29–13	
Apr. 25	#11 Texas Tech*	#10	Baum Stadium	Cancelled						
Apr. 27	Alabama	#10	Baum Stadium	**W** 7–3	**B. Knight** (7–0)	Finnerty (4–3)	**J. Reindl** (3)	10,835	30–13	11–8
Apr. 28	Alabama	#10	Baum Stadium	**W** 7–4	**E. Lee** (4–2)	Guffey (1–2)	**B. Loseke** (2)	10,846	31–13	12–8
Apr. 29	Alabama	#10	Baum Stadium	**W** 9–7	**B. Loseke** (1–1)	Duarte (3–3)	**J. Reindl** (4)	9,265	32–13	13–8

May: 5–4 (3–0 home; 2–4 away)

Date	Opponent	Rank	Site/stadium	Score	Win	Loss	Save	Attendance	Overall record	SEC record
May 4	at LSU	#6	Alex Box Stadium; Baton Rouge, Louisiana	**W** 5–4	**B. Loseke** (2–1)	Bush (0–1)	**J. Reindl** (5)	10,776	33–13	14–8
May 5	at LSU	#6	Alex Box Stadium	**L** 4–6	Fontenot (1–0)	**K. Murphy** (5–4)	Peterson (2)	10,948	33–14	14–9
May 6	at LSU	#6	Alex Box Stadium	**L** 5–7	Labas (6–1)	**I. Campbell** (3–5)	Beck (1)	10,932	33–15	14–10
May 11	#23 Texas A&M	#6	Baum Stadium	**W** 9–3	**B. Knight** (8–0)	Kilkenny (8–3)		9,826	34–15	15–10
May 12	#23 Texas A&M	#6	Baum Stadium	**W** 3–1	**K. Murphy** (6–4)	Doxaxis (6–4)	**B. Loseke** (3)	9,989	35–15	16–10
May 13	#23 Texas A&M	#6	Baum Stadium	**W** 6–3	**I. Campbell** (4–5)	Kolek (5–5)		8,538	36–15	17–10
May 17	at #8 Georgia	#5	Foley Field; Athens, Georgia	**W** 8–6	**B. Knight** (9–0)	Locey (6–2)	**M. Cronin** (10)	2,222	37–15	18–10
May 18	at #8 Georgia	#5	Foley Field	**L** 7–8 ^{10}	Schunk (2–1)	**B. Loseke** (2–2)		2,331	37–16	18–11
May 19	at #8 Georgia	#5	Foley Field	**L** 2–3	Smith (8–1)	**E. Lee** (4–3)	Webb (3)	2,337	37–17	18–12

Postseason
SEC tournament

Date	Opponent	Rank	Site/stadium	Score	Win	Loss	Save	Attendance	Overall record	SECT record
May 23	#14 South Carolina	#9	Hoover Metropolitan Stadium; Hoover, Alabama	**W** 13–8	**K. Murphy** (7–4)	Chapman (5–5)		6,710	38–17	1–0
May 25	#2 Florida	#9	Hoover Metropolitan Stadium	**W** 8–2	**B. Knight** (10–0)	Kowar (9–4)	**M. Cronin** (11)	1,384	39–17	2–0
May 26	LSU	#9	Hoover Metropolitan Stadium	**L** 1–2	Hess (7–5)	**I. Campbell** (4–6)	Bush (2)	10,381	39–18	2–1

NCAA Fayetteville Regional

Date	Opponent	Rank	Site/stadium	Score	Win	Loss	Save	Attendance	Overall record	Regional record
June 1	Oral Roberts	#10	Baum Stadium	**W** 10–2	**B. Knight** (11–0)	McGregor (6–2)		9,215	40–18	1–0
June 2	Southern Miss	#10	Baum Stadium	**W** 10–2	**K. Murphy** (8–4)	Powers (5–2)		10,213	41–18	2–0
June 3	Dallas Baptist	#10	Baum Stadium	**W** 4–3	**J. Reindl** (3–1)	Funderburk (1–3)	**M. Cronin** (12)	9,715	42–18	3–0

NCAA Fayetteville Super Regional

Date	Opponent	Rank	Site/stadium	Score	Win	Loss	Save	Attendance	Overall record	Super Regional record
June 9	#10 South Carolina	#4	Baum Stadium	**W** 9–3	**B. Knight** (12–0)	Demurias (7–1)	**B. Loseke** (4)	11,722	43–18	1–0
June 10	#10 South Carolina	#4	Baum Stadium	**L** 5–8	Morris (9–3)	**K. Murphy** (8–5)	Bridges (5)	11,481	43–19	1–1
June 11	#10 South Carolina	#4	Baum Stadium	**W** 14–4	**B. Loseke** (3–2)	Mlodzinski (3–6)		11,217	44–19	2–1

College World Series

Date	Opponent	Rank	Site/stadium	Score	Win	Loss	Save	Attendance	Overall record	CWS record
June 17	#13 Texas	#5	TD Ameritrade Park Omaha; Omaha, Nebraska	**W** 11–5	**B. Knight** (13–0)	Kingham (8–5)		23,034	45–19	1–0
June 20	#9 Texas Tech	#5	TD Ameritrade Park Omaha	**W** 7–4	**B. Loseke** (4–2)	Martin (7–6)		13,637	46–19	2–0
June 22	#1 Florida	#5	TD Ameritrade Park Omaha	**W** 5–2	**I. Campbell** (5–6)	Singer (12–3)	**M. Cronin** (13)	25,016	47–19	3–0
June 26 (Note: Postponed from June 25 due to inclement weather.)	#3 Oregon State	#5	TD Ameritrade Park Omaha	**W** 4–1	**B. Knight** (14–0)	Heimlich (16–3)	**M. Cronin** (14)	25,321	48–19	4–0
June 27	#3 Oregon State	#5	TD Ameritrade Park Omaha	**L** 3–5	Abel (7–1)	**M. Cronin** (2–2)	Mulholland (16)	25,580	48–20	4–1
June 28	#3 Oregon State	#5	TD Ameritrade Park Omaha	**L** 0–5	Abel (8–1)	**I. Campbell** (5–7)		19,323	48–21	4–2

== NCAA tournament ==
=== Fayetteville Regional ===
Fayetteville Regional Round 1
(4) Oral Roberts Golden Eagles	vs.	(1) No. 10 Arkansas Razorbacks

June 1, 2018, 2:04 pm (CDT) at Baum Stadium in Fayetteville, Arkansas, 91 °F (33 °C), partly cloudy
Team	1	2	3	4	5	6	7	8	9	R	H	E
(4) Oral Roberts	0	0	0	0	1	0	1	0	0	2	5	1
(1) Arkansas	0	0	2	0	0	4	1	3	X	10	14	0
WP: Blaine Knight (11–0) LP: Justin McGregor (6–2); Home runs: ORU: Riley Keizor×2 (5); ARK: Heston Kjerstad×2 (13), Carson Shaddy (11), Jax Biggers (4); Attendance: 9,215

Fayetteville Regional Round 2
(1) No. 10 Arkansas Razorbacks	vs.	(2) Southern Miss Golden Eagles

June 2, 2018, 7:04 pm (CDT) at Baum Stadium in Fayetteville, Arkansas, 88 °F (31 °C), cloudy
Team	1	2	3	4	5	6	7	8	9	R	H	E
(1) Arkansas	0	7	0	0	2	0	0	0	1	10	13	1
(2) Southern Miss	0	0	0	0	0	0	0	0	2	2	5	1
WP: Kacey Murphy (8–4) LP: Stevie Powers (5–2); Home runs: ARK: Jared Gates (5), Eric Cole (13); USM: Matthew Guidry (4); Attendance: 10,213

Fayetteville Regional Final
(3) Dallas Baptist Patriots	vs.	(1) No. 10 Arkansas Razorbacks

June 3, 2018, 7:04 pm (CDT) at Baum Stadium in Fayetteville, Arkansas, 84 °F (29 °C), clear
Team	1	2	3	4	5	6	7	8	9	R	H	E
(3) Dallas Baptist	1	1	0	0	0	0	0	0	1	3	9	0
(1) Arkansas	0	0	1	2	0	0	1	0	X	4	7	1
WP: Jake Reindl (3–1) LP: Kody Funderburk (1–3) Sv: Matt Cronin (12); Attendance: 9,715

=== Fayetteville Super Regional ===
Fayetteville Super Regional — Game 1
No. 10 South Carolina Gamecocks	vs.	(5) No. 4 Arkansas Razorbacks

June 9, 2018, 5:34 pm (CDT) at Baum Stadium in Fayetteville, Arkansas, 91 °F (33 °C), clear
Team	1	2	3	4	5	6	7	8	9	R	H	E
South Carolina	0	1	0	1	0	1	0	0	0	3	6	0
#5 Arkansas	0	0	1	2	0	1	4	1	X	9	10	2
WP: Blaine Knight (12–0) LP: Eddy Demurias (7–1) Sv: Barrett Loseke (3); Home runs: SC: LT Tolbert (7), Madison Stokes (11); ARK: None; Attendance: 11,722

Fayetteville Super Regional — Game 2
(5) No. 4 Arkansas Razorbacks	vs.	No. 10 South Carolina Gamecocks

June 10, 2018, 2:04 pm (CDT) at Baum Stadium in Fayetteville, Arkansas, 86 °F (30 °C), clear
Team	1	2	3	4	5	6	7	8	9	R	H	E
#5 Arkansas	0	0	1	0	0	2	1	1	0	5	10	0
South Carolina	1	0	1	0	5	1	0	0	X	8	10	4
WP: Cody Morris (9–3) LP: Kacey Murphy (8–5) Sv: Sawyer Bridges (5); Home runs: ARK: Heston Kjerstad (14), Carson Shaddy (12); SC: Justin Row (7), LT Tolbert (8), Hunter Taylor (9); Attendance: 11,481

Fayetteville Super Regional — Game 3
No. 10 South Carolina Gamecocks	vs.	(5) No. 4 Arkansas Razorbacks

June 11, 2018, 6:04 pm (CDT) at Baum Stadium in Fayetteville, Arkansas, 91 °F (33 °C), clear
Team	1	2	3	4	5	6	7	8	9	R	H	E
South Carolina	0	0	0	2	0	0	1	1	0	4	6	1
#5 Arkansas	5	2	0	1	5	0	1	0	X	14	11	0
WP: Barrett Loseke (3–2) LP: Carmen Mlodzinski (3–6); Home runs: SC: Jacob Olson×2 (12); ARK: Carson Shaddy (13), Eric Cole (14); Attendance: 11,217

== College World Series ==
=== First round ===
2018 College World Series — First Round
(13) No. 5 Texas Longhorns	vs.	(5) No. 4 Arkansas Razorbacks

June 17, 2018, 1:00 pm (CDT) at TD Ameritrade Park Omaha in Omaha, Nebraska
Team	1	2	3	4	5	6	7	8	9	R	H	E
#13 Texas	0	0	1	0	1	0	0	2	1	5	9	0
#5 Arkansas	1	0	0	0	2	8	0	0	X	11	15	1
WP: Blaine Knight (13–0) LP: Nolan Kingham (8–5); Home runs: TEX: None; ARK: Luke Bonfield (9); Attendance: 23,034

=== Second round ===
2018 College World Series — Second Round
(9) No. 6 Texas Tech Red Raiders	vs.	(5) No. 4 Arkansas Razorbacks

June 20, 2018, 2:30 pm (CDT) at TD Ameritrade Park Omaha in Omaha, Nebraska
Team	1	2	3	4	5	6	7	8	9	R	H	E
#5 Arkansas	2	1	0	2	0	0	0	2	0	7	12	1
#9 Texas Tech	0	0	0	0	2	0	0	0	2	4	6	0
WP: Barrett Loseke (4–2) LP: Davis Martin (7–6); Home runs: ARK: Jared Gates (6), Dominic Fletcher (9); TTU: None; Attendance: 13,637

=== Semifinals ===
2018 College World Series — National Semifinals — Game 1
(5) No. 4 Arkansas Razorbacks	vs.	(1) No. 2 Florida Gators

June 22, 2018, 7:00 pm (CDT) at TD Ameritrade Park Omaha in Omaha, Nebraska, 74 °F (23 °C)
Team	1	2	3	4	5	6	7	8	9	R	H	E
#5 Arkansas	1	0	1	0	2	1	0	0	0	5	11	1
#1 Florida	0	0	0	0	2	0	0	0	0	2	3	2
WP: Isaiah Campbell (5–6) LP: Brady Singer (12–3) Sv: Matt Cronin (13); Home runs: ARK: Dominic Fletcher (10); FLA: None; Attendance: 25,016

First inning — The Gators started the game in the field; Florida pitcher Brady Singer started on the mound. Casey Martin achieved the Hogs' first hit with a single to left field. Third to bat for Arkansas was Heston Kjerstad, who flew out to right field, but advanced Martin to second in the process. Arkansas' fourth hitter was designated hitter Luke Bonfield, who, on the at bat's tenth pitch, singled to center field, scoring Martin to make it 1–0 Hogs.

Isaiah Campbell started on the mound for the Hogs. Florida's Deacon Liput flew out to short to begin the inning; Nelson Maldonado grounded out to first two pitches later. Third in the lineup for the Gators was third baseman Jonathan India, who struck out after chasing a 2–2 pitch outside, ending the inning. Arkansas 1, Florida 0

Second inning — Carson Shaddy and Jared Gates both grounded out to give Florida a quick two outs. Catcher Grant Koch walked on a 3–2 pitch, and advanced to second on a Jax Biggers single to right field. On the next pitch, Eric Cole, the Hogs' first hitter, grounded to first for the third out.

Isaiah Campbell retired three straight batters in the bottom of the second with three strikeouts in a row, putting him at four on the night and ending the inning. Arkansas 1, Florida 0

Third inning — Casey Martin delivered his second hit of the game to start the third, a single to left. Heston Kjerstad got to first and advanced Martin to second on an error after Blake Reese dropped a grounder. Dominic Fletcher batted in Arkansas' second RBI with a single to right, advancing Kjerstad to third. Carson Shaddy struck out and Jared Gates grounded out to end the top of the 3rd.

Second baseman Blake Reese flew out to start the inning for the Gators. Campbell struck out Brady Smith for the second out and Nick Horvath for the third, ending the inning and putting his tally at six. Arkansas 2, Florida 0

Fourth inning — Grant Koch flew out to short to begin the fourth inning. Jax Biggers followed by flying out to left field for the second out, and Eric Cole grounded out to short, quickly ending the inning for the Gators defense.

Deacon Liput was first up for Florida in the fourth; his fly ball to center was the first time the Gators had left the infield on a swing. Maldonado grounded to short for the second out, and Jonathan India popped up to first for the third. Arkansas 2, Florida 0

Fifth inning — Arkansas' Casey Martin became 3-for-3 with a double to left field. Kjerstad was next up; his groundout to first advanced Martin to third. Luke Bonfield delivered the Hogs' third RBI on the next AB, and Dominic Fletcher followed that up with a solo home run to right field, the game's first.

Florida's first hit came with two outs in the bottom of the fifth, as Austin Langworthy singled to center field. Campbell hit the next batter to put runners on first and second. Brady Smith, Florida's next hitter, gave the Gators their first RBI with a single to center, putting runners on the corners. Florida's second run came via a wild pitch, as Blake Reese came in to score from home. Campbell then struck out Nick Horvath, forcing the Gators to strand one runner and ending the inning. Arkansas 4, Florida 2

Sixth inning — Following 89 pitches and 2 strikeouts, Florida elected to pull Brady Singer from the game and put Tommy Mace on the mound. On Mace's second pitch, Jared Gates singled to left field for the Hogs' eighth hit of the night. Jax Biggers took advantage of a wild throw to first on his hit, advancing to second and moving Gates to third. Casey Martin continued a good night with a single and another Razorback RBI, putting runners on the corners. Unfortunately for the Hogs, 2 runners were stranded when Kjerstad chased a pitch in the dirt for the third out.

Deacon Liput reached base after a wild throw to first, Arkansas' first error of the game. After throwing 85 pitches and recording 8 strikeouts in 5 1/3 innings, Isaiah Campbell exited the game and right-hander Jake Reindl took the mound. Reindl's first pitch resulted in a fly-out to center, as did his ninth, which ended the inning. Arkansas 5, Florida 2

Seventh inning — First up for Arkansas was Luke Bonfield; he grounded out to short for the inning's first out. The second came several pitches later as Dominic Fletcher popped up to center field. Carson Shaddy struck out on a 1–2 pitch to end the inning moments later, marking the second inning of the game without an Arkansas runner on base.

The first pitch of the bottom of the seventh resulted in a fly-out to left field. Two Florida batters then walked, but Reindl regained his confidence to finish the inning with a strikeout and a groundout to third, stranding two Gator batters. Arkansas 5, Florida 2

Eighth inning — Jared Gates and Grant Koch provided two quick outs before Jax Biggers found center field for a single. However, Biggers ended the inning stranded after Eric Cole was thrown out at first several pitches later.

Reindl was taken out of the game, having thrown 27 pitches (with 1 strikeout), and left-handed closer Matt Cronin took the mound. On his fifth pitch, leadoff hitter Deacon Liput ripped a single to right for his first hit of the night and the Gators' third. A fly ball to left field that found the glove of Heston Kjerstad was the source of the first out, with the second coming on a called strike three to Jonathan India and the third coming a pitch later on a fly ball to deep center field. Arkansas 5, Florida 2

Ninth inning — The ninth inning began with Casey Martin popping up, the first time on the night he had not reached base. Heston Kjerstad flew out to center two pitches later, ending his night at 0–5. Luke Bonfield singled to center on the next pitch, his second hit of the night. Several pitches later, however, Dominic Fletcher was thrown out at first, putting the game in the hands of his defense.

The bottom of the ninth began with a long, fly ball to right field; the ball was caught by Eric Cole in foul territory for the first out. The next batter up was Austin Langworthy, who grounded out to first for the second out. Matt Cronin then delivered his second strikeout of the game on a 0–2 pitch, retiring Blake Reese and ending the game, sending Arkansas to the College World Series Championship Series for the first time since 1979. Arkansas 5, Florida 2

== CWS Championship Series ==
=== Game 1 ===
2018 College World Series — Championship — Game 1
(5) No. 4 Arkansas Razorbacks	vs.	(3) No. 2 Oregon State Beavers

June 26, 2018, 6:09 pm (CDT) at TD Ameritrade Park Omaha in Omaha, Nebraska, 83 °F (28 °C)
Team	1	2	3	4	5	6	7	8	9	R	H	E
#5 Arkansas	0	0	0	0	4	0	0	0	0	4	5	0
#3 Oregon State	0	1	0	0	0	0	0	0	0	1	9	1
WP: Blaine Knight (14–0) LP: Luke Heimlich (16–3) Sv: Matt Cronin (14); Attendance: 25,321

Game 1 of the CWS Championship series was originally scheduled for June 25 at 6:00 p.m. CDT, but it was postponed to June 26 due to inclement weather following a 97–minute delay.

=== Game 2 ===
2018 College World Series — Championship — Game 2
(3) No. 2 Oregon State Beavers	vs.	(5) No. 4 Arkansas Razorbacks

June 27, 2018, 6:00 pm (CDT) at TD Ameritrade Park Omaha in Omaha, Nebraska
Team	1	2	3	4	5	6	7	8	9	R	H	E
#3 Oregon State	0	0	0	1	1	0	0	0	3	5	12	1
#5 Arkansas	0	1	0	0	2	0	0	0	0	3	7	1
WP: Kevin Abel (7–1) LP: Matt Cronin (2–2) Sv: Jake Mulholland (16); Home runs: OSU: Adley Rutschman (9), Trevor Larnach (19); ARK: None; Attendance: 25,580

=== Game 3 ===
2018 College World Series — Championship — Game 3
(5) No. 4 Arkansas Razorbacks	vs.	(3) No. 2 Oregon State Beavers

June 28, 2018, 5:30 pm (CDT) at TD Ameritrade Park Omaha in Omaha, Nebraska
Team	1	2	3	4	5	6	7	8	9	R	H	E
#5 Arkansas	0	0	0	0	0	0	0	0	0	0	2	1
#3 Oregon State	2	0	1	0	1	0	0	1	X	5	7	0
WP: Kevin Abel (8–1) LP: Isaiah Campbell (5–7) Sv: None; Attendance: 19,323

== Record vs. conference opponents ==
Last two do not qualify for conf. tourn. Blank are not scheduled. Blue are home games, otherwise away.

2018 SEC baseball records Source: 2018 SEC baseball game results
Team	W–L	ALA	ARK	AUB	FLA	UGA	KEN	LSU	MSU	MIZZ	MISS	SCAR	TENN	TAMU	VAN	Team	Div	SR	SW
ALA	8–22		0–3	0–3	.	1–2	2–1	1–2	1–2	2–1	1–2	.	0–3	0–3	.	ALA	W7	2–8	0–4
ARK	18–12	3–0		3–0	1–2	1–2	3–0	1–2	0–3	.	1–2	2–1	.	3–0	.	ARK	W2	5–5	4–1
AUB	15–15	3–0	0–3		1–2	.	1–2	2–1	2–1	1–2	0–3	.	.	2–1	3–0	AUB	W3	5–5	2–2
FLA	20–10	.	2–1	2–1		2–1	2–1	.	0–3	3–0	.	2–1	2–1	2–1	3–0	FLA	E1	9–1	2–1
UGA	18–12	2–1	2–1	.	1–2		1–2	.	.	3–0	1–2	3–0	2–1	2–1	1–2	UGA	E2	6–4	2–0
KEN	13–17	1–2	0–3	2–1	1–2	2–1		.	2–1	2–1	.	2–1	1–2	.	0–3	KEN	E5	5–5	0–2
LSU	15–15	2–1	2–1	1–2	.	.	.		2–1	2–1	1–2	0–3	3–0	1–2	1–2	LSU	W4	5–5	1–1
MSU	15–15	2–1	3–0	1–2	3–0	.	1–2	1–2		1–2	2–1	.	.	1–2	0–3	MSU	W5	4–6	2–1
MIZZ	12–18	1–2	.	2–1	0–3	0–3	1–2	1–2	2–1		.	1–2	2–1	.	2–1	MIZZ	E6	4–6	0–2
MISS	18–12	2–1	2–1	3–0	.	2–1	.	2–1	1–2	.		1–2	2–1	2–1	1–2	MISS	W1	7–3	1–0
SCAR	17–13	.	1–2	.	1–2	0–3	1–2	3–0	.	2–1	2–1		3–0	2–1	2–1	SCAR	E3	6–4	2–1
TENN	12–18	3–0	.	.	1–2	1–2	2–1	0–3	.	1–2	1–2	0–3		2–1	1–2	TENN	E7	3–7	1–2
TAMU	13–17	3–0	0–3	1–2	1–2	1–2	.	2–1	2–1	.	1–2	1–2	1–2		.	TAMU	W6	3–7	1–1
VAN	16–14	.	.	0–3	0–3	2–1	3–0	2–1	3–0	1–2	2–1	1–2	2–1	.		VAN	E4	6–4	2–2
Team	W–L	ALA	ARK	AUB	FLA	UGA	KEN	LSU	MSU	MIZZ	MISS	SCAR	TENN	TAMU	VAN	Team	Div	SR	SW

Updated for entire regular season.

== 2018 MLB draft ==
Round	Pick	Player	Position	MLB Club
3	87	Blaine Knight	P	Baltimore Orioles
4	122	Eric Cole	OF	Kansas City Royals
5	144	Grant Koch	C	Pittsburgh Pirates
8	239	Jax Biggers	SS	Texas Rangers
10	311	Carson Shaddy	2B	Washington Nationals
11	315	Kacey Murphy	P	Detroit Tigers
15	461	Evan Lee	P	Washington Nationals
17	517	Barrett Loseke	P	New York Yankees
17	518	Jake Reindl	P	Chicago Cubs
24	721	Isaiah Campbell	P	Los Angeles Angels
37	1119	Zack Plunkett	C	Arizona Diamondbacks
Source: MLB Draft Tracker
