= 2018 Florida Gators baseball team =

American college baseball season

2018 Florida Gators baseball

SEC regular season champions Gainesville Regional champions Gainesville Super Regional champions

College World Series, 2–2
- Conference: Southeastern Conference

Ranking
- Coaches: No. 3
- CB: No. 3
- Record: 49–21 (20–10 SEC)
- Head coach: Kevin O'Sullivan (11th year)
- Assistant coach: Craig Bell (11th year); Brad Weitzel (11th year)
- Home stadium: Alfred A. McKethan Stadium

2018 Southeastern Conference baseball standings
	Conf.				Overall
Team	W		L	PCT	W		L	PCT
East Division
No. 3 Florida ^{x}‍†‍‍^{y}	20	–	10	.667	49	–	21	.700
No. 20 Georgia ‍‍‍^{y}	18	–	12	.600	39	–	21	.650
No. 12 South Carolina ‍‍‍^{y}	17	–	13	.567	37	–	26	.587
No. 16 Vanderbilt ‍‍‍^{y}	16	–	14	.533	35	–	27	.565
Kentucky ‍‍‍	13	–	17	.433	34	–	22	.607
Missouri ‍‍‍	12	–	18	.400	34	–	22	.607
Tennessee ‍‍‍	12	–	18	.400	29	–	27	.518
West Division
No. 19 Ole Miss ^{x}‍‍‡‍^{y}	18	–	12	.600	48	–	18	.727
No. 2 Arkansas ^{x}‍‍‍^{y}	18	–	12	.600	48	–	21	.696
No. 15 Auburn ‍‍‍^{y}	15	–	15	.500	43	–	23	.652
LSU ‍‍‍^{y}	15	–	15	.500	39	–	27	.591
No. 4 Mississippi State ‍‍‍^{y}	15	–	15	.500	39	–	29	.574
Texas A&M ‍‍‍^{y}	13	–	17	.433	40	–	22	.645
Alabama ‍‍‍	8	–	22	.267	27	–	29	.482
x – Division champion † – Conference champion ‡ – Tournament champion y – Invited to the NCAA tournament Rankings from Collegiate Baseball

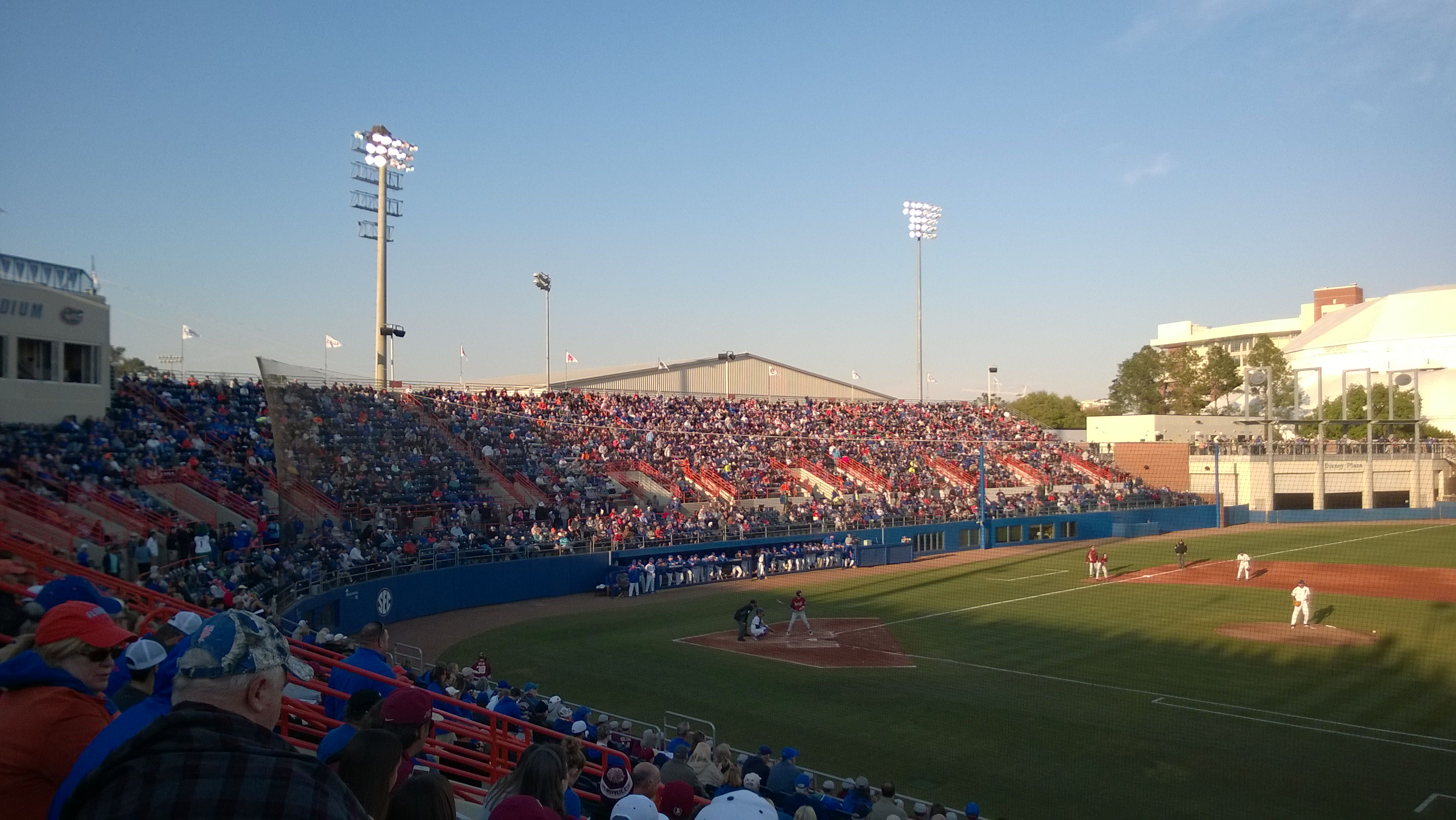
Florida faces Florida State in front of a sell-out crowd at McKethan Stadium

The 2018 Florida Gators baseball team represented the University of Florida in the sport of baseball during the 2018 college baseball season. The Gators competed in the Eastern Division of the Southeastern Conference (SEC). They played their home games at Alfred A. McKethan Stadium on the university's Gainesville, Florida campus. The team was coached by Kevin O'Sullivan in his eleventh season as Florida head coach. The Gators entered the season as the defending national champions, having defeated LSU two games to none in the championship series of the 2017 College World Series.

== Roster ==
=== By player ===
2018 Florida Gators baseball team
Players
Coaches

#	Pos.	Name	B/T	Height	Weight	Year	Home town
35	LHP	Andrew Baker	L/L	5 ft 10 in (1.78 m)	190 lb (86 kg)	So	Haines City, FL
32	OF	Keenan Bell	L/L	6 ft 1 in (1.85 m)	235 lb (107 kg)	So	Jacksonville, FL
21	RHP	Nick Blasucci (injured)	R/R	6 ft 2 in (1.88 m)	197 lb (89 kg)	Jr	Fort Myers, FL
15	LHP	Jordan Butler	L/L	6 ft 0 in (1.83 m)	173 lb (78 kg)	Fr	Tampa, FL
17	RHP	Michael Byrne	R/R	6 ft 3 in (1.91 m)	220 lb (100 kg)	Jr	Orlando, FL
1	RHP	Connor Churchill	R/R	6 ft 2 in (1.88 m)	192 lb (87 kg)	Fr	Palm Harbor, FL
14	INF	Jose Ciccarello	R/R	5 ft 8 in (1.73 m)	176 lb (80 kg)	Fr	Tampa, FL
16	OF	Wil Dalton	R/R	6 ft 0 in (1.83 m)	187 lb (85 kg)	So	Spring Hill, TN
18	RHP	Tyler Dyson	R/R	6 ft 3 in (1.91 m)	230 lb (104 kg)	So	Bradenton, FL
30	RHP	Felix Garcia	R/R	5 ft 10 in (1.78 m)	184 lb (83 kg)	Jr	Miami, FL
11	C	Jonah Girand	R/R	6 ft 0 in (1.83 m)	203 lb (92 kg)	Jr	Winter Park, FL
10	LHP	Colton Gordon	L/L	6 ft 3 in (1.91 m)	200 lb (91 kg)	Fr	Bradenton, FL
2	C	Cal Greenfield	R/R	6 ft 0 in (1.83 m)	213 lb (97 kg)	Fr	Chicago, IL
26	LHP	Nick Horvath	R/L	5 ft 10 in (1.78 m)	201 lb (91 kg)	Sr	Jupiter, FL
6	INF	Jonathan India	R/R	6 ft 0 in (1.83 m)	195 lb (88 kg)	Jr	Coral Springs, FL
37	RHP	Jackson Kowar	R/R	6 ft 5 in (1.96 m)	180 lb (82 kg)	Jr	Charlotte, NC
44	OF	Austin Langworthy	L/L	5 ft 10 in (1.78 m)	194 lb (88 kg)	So	Williston, FL
23	RHP	Jack Leftwich	R/R	6 ft 2 in (1.88 m)	203 lb (92 kg)	Fr	Orlando, FL
8	INF	Deacon Liput	L/R	5 ft 9 in (1.75 m)	190 lb (86 kg)	Jr	Oviedo, FL
34	RHP	Nick Long	R/R	6 ft 0 in (1.83 m)	195 lb (88 kg)	So	Sarasota, FL
47	RHP	Tommy Mace	R/R	6 ft 6 in (1.98 m)	189 lb (86 kg)	Fr	Tampa, FL
27	OF	Nelson Maldonado	R/R	5 ft 10 in (1.78 m)	195 lb (88 kg)	Jr	Tampa, FL
36	LHP	Cole Maye	L/L	6 ft 7 in (2.01 m)	227 lb (103 kg)	So	Huntersville, NC
4	INF	Brady McConnell	R/R	6 ft 1 in (1.85 m)	177 lb (80 kg)	Fr	Merritt Island, FL
25	RHP	Hunter McMullen	R/R	6 ft 2 in (1.88 m)	194 lb (88 kg)	Fr	Ocala, FL
52	RHP	Kirby McMullen	R/R	5 ft 11 in (1.8 m)	196 lb (89 kg)	So	Ocala, FL
3	INF	Garrett Milchin (injured)	L/R	6 ft 5 in (1.96 m)	211 lb (96 kg)	So	Windermere, FL
12	INF	Blake Reese	S/R	5 ft 11 in (1.8 m)	178 lb (81 kg)	Jr	Tallahassee, FL
28	RHP	Hunter Ruth (injured)	R/R	6 ft 2 in (1.88 m)	189 lb (86 kg)	Fr	Gainesville, FL
22	C	J. J. Schwarz (C)	R/R	6 ft 2 in (1.88 m)	207 lb (94 kg)	Sr	Palm Beach Gardens, FL
5	INF	Shane Shifflett	S/R	5 ft 10 in (1.78 m)	162 lb (73 kg)	Fr	Venice, FL
51	RHP	Brady Singer	R/R	6 ft 5 in (1.96 m)	200 lb (91 kg)	Jr	Eustis, FL
9	C	Brady Smith	R/R	5 ft 11 in (1.8 m)	188 lb (85 kg)	Fr	Niceville, FL

Head coach

7 Kevin O'Sullivan

Assistant coach(es)

33 Craig Bell
42 Brad Weitzel

Legend

- (C) Team captain
- (S) Suspended
- (I) Ineligible
- Injured
- Current redshirt

Roster
Last update: March 17, 2018

=== By position ===
2018 Florida Gators roster
Pitchers: 1 – Connor Churchill – Freshman; 3 – Garrett Milchin – Sophomore; 10 – Colton Gordon – Freshman; 15 – Jordan Butler – Freshman; 17 – Michael Byrne – Junior; 18 – Tyler Dyson – Sophomore; 21 – Nick Blasucci – Junior; 23 – Jack Leftwich – Freshman; 25 – Hunter McMullen – Freshman; 26 – Nick Horvath – Senior; 28 – Hunter Ruth – Freshman; 30 – Felix Garcia – Freshman; 34 – Nick Long – Sophomore; 35 – Andrew Baker – Sophomore; 36 – Cole Maye – Sophomore; 37 – Jackson Kowar – Junior; 44 – Austin Langworthy – Sophomore; 47 – Tommy Mace – Freshman; 51 – Brady Singer – Junior; 52 – Kirby McMullen – Sophomore	Catchers: 2 – Cal Greenfield – Freshman; 9 – Brady Smith – Freshman; 11 – Jonah Girand – Junior; 22 – J. J. Schwarz – Senior; Infielders: 3 – Garrett Milchin – Sophomore; 6 – Jonathan India – Junior; 8 – Deacon Liput – Junior; 12 – Blake Reese – Junior; 14 – Jose Cicarello – Freshman; 18 – Tyler Dyson – Freshman; 22 – J. J. Schwarz – Senior; 27 – Nelson Maldonado – Sophomore; 32 – Keenan Bell – Sophomore	Outfielders: 12 – Blake Reese – Junior; 16 – Wil Dalton – Sophomore; 26 – Nick Horvath – Senior; 27 – Nelson Maldonado – Junior; 32 – Keenan Bell – Sophomore; 35 – Andrew Baker – Sophomore; 44 – Austin Langworthy – Sophomore; 52 – Kirby McMullen – Sophomore

== Coaching staff ==
Coaching Staff
- 7 – Kevin O'Sullivan – Head coach – 11th year
- 33 – Craig Bell – Assistant coach – 11th year
- 42 – Brad Weitzel – Assistant coach – 11th year
- 31 – Lars Davis – Volunteer assistant coach – 4th year
- Jon Michelini – Athletic trainer – 5th year
- Paul Chandler – Strength & conditioning coordinator – 9th year

== Schedule ==
Legend
	Florida win
	Florida loss
	Postponement
**Bold**	Florida team member

2018 Florida Gators baseball game log
Regular season
February

Date	Opponent	Rank	Stadium Site	Score	Win	Loss	Save	Attendance	Overall Record	SEC Record
February 16	Siena	No. 1	McKethan Stadium; Gainesville, FL	7–1	**Singer** (1–0)	White (0–1)	None	5,270	1–0	–
February 17	Siena	No. 1	McKethan Stadium	10–2	**Kowar** (1–0)	Miller (0–1)	None	4,306	2–0	–
February 18	Siena	No. 1	McKethan Stadium	19–2	**Dyson** (1–0)	Nolan (0–1)	None	3,955	3–0	–
February 20	Florida Atlantic	No. 1	McKethan Stadium	6–1	**Leftwich** (1–0)	Prather (0–1)	None	2,944	4–0	–
February 21	Bethune–Cookman	No. 1	McKethan Stadium	7–4	**Long** (1–0)	Krull (0–1)	**Byrne** (1)	3,249	5–0	–
February 23	at No. 24 Miami (FL); Rivalry	No. 1	Alex Rodriguez Park; Coral Gables, FL	7–3	**Singer** (2–0)	Bargfeldt (1–1)	**Mace** (1)	3,596	6–0	–
February 24	at No. 24 Miami (FL); Rivalry	No. 1	Alex Rodriguez Park	8–2	**Kowar** (2–0)	Veliz (0–1)	**Leftwich** (1)	4,156	7–0	–
February 25	at No. 24 Miami (FL); Rivalry	No. 1	Alex Rodriguez Park	0–2	McKendry (1–1)	**Dyson** (1–1)	Cabezas (2)	3,388	7–1	–
February 27	at North Florida	No. 1	Harmon Stadium; Jacksonville, FL	4–0	**Butler** (1–0)	German (0–1)	None	1,671	8–1	–
February 28	North Florida	No. 1	McKethan Stadium	8–3	**Baker** (1–0)	Norkus (2–1)	None	3,338	9–1	–

March

Date	Opponent	Rank	Stadium Site	Score	Win	Loss	Save	Attendance	Overall Record	SEC Record
March 2	Stony Brook	No. 1	McKethan Stadium	12–5	**Singer** (3–0)	Creighton (1–1)	**Byrne** (2)	3,366	10–1	–
March 3	Stony Brook	No. 1	McKethan Stadium	8–0	**Kowar** (3–0)	Clarke (1–1)	None	3,925	11–1	–
March 4	Stony Brook	No. 1	McKethan Stadium	3–1	**Dyson** (2–1)	Herrmann (2–1)	**Byrne** (3)	3,675	12–1	–
March 6	at UCF	No. 1	John Euliano Park; Orlando, FL	7–9	Montgomery (2–0)	**Leftwich** (1–1)	Westberg (1)	4,016	12–2	–
March 7	UCF	No. 1	McKethan Stadium	2–4	Sheridan (2–0)	**Butler** (1–1)	Westberg (2)	3,253	12–3	–
March 9	Rhode Island	No. 1	McKethan Stadium	9–0	**Singer** (4–0)	Wilson (0–3)	None	3,075	13–3	–
March 10 (1)	Rhode Island	No. 1	McKethan Stadium	9–2	**Dyson** (3–1)	Jangols (1–2)	None	3,121	14–3	–
March 10 (2)^{[a]}	Rhode Island	No. 1	McKethan Stadium	3–2	**Leftwich** (2–1)	Johnson (0–2)	None	3,446	15–3	–
March 13	No. 7 Florida State; Rivalry	No. 2	McKethan Stadium	12–6	**Mace** (1–0)	Karp (3–1)	None	6,042	16–3	–
March 16	at South Carolina	No. 2	Founders Park; Columbia, SC	7–3	**Singer** (5–0)	Hill (2–2)	**Byrne** (4)	7,034	17–3	1–0
March 17	at South Carolina	No. 2	Founders Park	7–15	Morris (4–1)	**Kowar** (3–1)	None	7,207	17–4	1–1
March 18	at South Carolina	No. 2	Founders Park	3–2	**Dyson** (4–1)	Chapman (1–2)	**Byrne** (5)	7,113	18–4	2–1
March 20	Jacksonville	No. 2	McKethan Stadium	Postponed (rain) Makeup: March 21						
March 21	Jacksonville	No. 2	McKethan Stadium	10–3	**Baker** (2–0)	Stockton (1–3)	None	3,201	19–4	–
March 23	No. 4 Arkansas	No. 2	McKethan Stadium	3–6	Knight (4–0)	**Singer** (5–1)	Cronin (4)	5,025	19–5	2–2
March 24	No. 4 Arkansas	No. 2	McKethan Stadium	17–2	**Kowar** (4–1)	Campbell (2–3)	None	4,815	20–5	3–2
March 25	No. 4 Arkansas	No. 2	McKethan Stadium	5–4	**Byrne** (1–0)	Murphy (3–1)	None	4,510	21–5	4–2
March 27	vs. No. 5 Florida State; Rivalry	No. 2	Baseball Grounds; Jacksonville, FL	1–0	**Leftwich** (3–1)	Karp (4–2)	**Byrne** (6)	9,613	22–5	–
March 30	No. 8 Vanderbilt	No. 2	McKethan Stadium	8–4	**Singer** (6–1)	Fellows (4–1)	**Byrne** (7)	3,781	23–5	5–2
March 31	No. 8 Vanderbilt	No. 2	McKethan Stadium	10–2	**Kowar** (5–1)	Raby (2–4)	None	4,835	24–5	6–2
^{^[a]}Rescheduled from March 11 due to the threat of rain.

April

Date	Opponent	Rank	Stadium Site	Score	Win	Loss	Save	Attendance	Overall Record	SEC Record
April 1	No. 8 Vanderbilt	No. 2	McKethan Stadium	8–2	**Butler** (2–1)	Hickman (5–1)	**Leftwich** (2)	3,736	25–5	7–2
April 3	Florida Gulf Coast	No. 1	McKethan Stadium	8–4	**Mace** (2–0)	Lumbert (4–1)	None	3,493	26–5	–
April 6	at Tennessee	No. 1	Lindsey Nelson Stadium; Knoxville, TN	Postponed (rain) Makeup: April 8 as a single-admission, 7-inning doubleheader						
April 7	at Tennessee	No. 1	Lindsey Nelson Stadium	22–6	**Singer** (7–1)	Crochet (2–4)	None	1,819	27–5	8–2
April 8 (1)	at Tennessee	No. 1	Lindsey Nelson Stadium	6–4^{11}	**Butler** (3–1)	Lingenfelter (2–3)	None	2,639	28–5	9–2
April 8 (2)	at Tennessee	No. 1	Lindsey Nelson Stadium	4–6^{7}	Neely (4–1)	**Dyson** (4–2)	None	2,639	28–6	9–3
April 10	at No. 10 Florida State; Rivalry	No. 1	Dick Howser Stadium; Tallahassee, FL	6–3	**Mace** (3–0)	Karp (5–3)	**Byrne** (8)	5,979	29–6	–
April 13	Missouri	No. 1	McKethan Stadium	3–1	**Butler** (4–1)	Sikkema (2–3)	**Byrne** (9)	6,214	30–6	10–3
April 14 (1)	Missouri	No. 1	McKethan Stadium	10–2	**Kowar** (6–1)	LaPlante (4–2)	None	5,820	31–6	11–3
April 14 (2)^{[b]}	Missouri	No. 1	McKethan Stadium	7–2	**Dyson** (5–2)	Plassmeyer (4–1)	**Byrne** (10)	3,955	32–6	12–3
April 17	Jacksonville	No. 1	McKethan Stadium	4–8	Meyer (1–0)	**Langworthy** (0–1)	None	3,478	32–7	–
April 19	at No. 9 Kentucky	No. 1	Cliff Hagan Stadium; Lexington, KY	11–2	**Singer** (8–1)	Hazelwood (0–1)	None	3,646	33–7	13–3
April 20	at No. 9 Kentucky	No. 1	Cliff Hagan Stadium	9–4	**Kowar** (7–1)	Hjelle (5–3)	None	4,174	34–7	14–3
April 21	at No. 9 Kentucky	No. 1	Cliff Hagan Stadium	2–3	Lewis (7–2)	**Dyson** (5–3)	Machamer (7)	4,461	34–8	14–4
April 24	Mercer	No. 1	McKethan Stadium	4–6	Broom (8–1)	**Churchill** (0–1)	None	3,133	34–9	–
April 26	No. 22 Auburn	No. 1	McKethan Stadium	3–1	**Singer** (9–1)	Mize (8–2)	**Byrne** (11)	3,931	35–9	15–4
April 27	No. 22 Auburn	No. 1	McKethan Stadium	5–11	Greenhill (3–1)	**Kowar** (7–2)	None	4,404	35–10	15–5
April 28	No. 22 Auburn	No. 1	McKethan Stadium	12–3	**Leftwich** (4–1)	Mitchell (0–1)	None	4,018	36–10	16–5
^{^[b]}Rescheduled from April 15 due to the threat of rain.

May

Date	Opponent	Rank	Stadium Site	Score	Win	Loss	Save	Attendance	Overall Record	SEC Record
May 4	at No. 18 Texas A&M	No. 1	Olsen Field; College Station, TX	9–0	**Singer** (10–1)	Kilkenny (8–2)	None	5,012	37–10	17–5
May 5	at No. 18 Texas A&M	No. 1	Olsen Field	6–1	**Kowar** (8–2)	Doxakis (6–3)	None	6,789	38–10	18–5
May 6	at No. 18 Texas A&M	No. 1	Olsen Field	3–7	Kolek (5–4)	**Leftwich** (4–2)	Hoffman (10)	5,259	38–11	18–6
May 8	South Florida	No. 1	McKethan Stadium	11–8	**Butler** (5–1)	King (4–2)	**Byrne** (12)	3,484	39–11	–
May 11	No. 15 Georgia	No. 1	McKethan Stadium	7–6	**Byrne** (2–0)	Kristofak (3–2)	None	5,279	40–11	19–6
May 12	No. 15 Georgia	No. 1	McKethan Stadium	9–3	**Kowar** (9–2)	Hancock (6–4)	None	4,621	41–11	20–6
May 13	No. 15 Georgia	No. 1	McKethan Stadium	1–4	Smith (7–1)	**Leftwich** (4–3)	Schunk (8)	4,135	41–12	20–7
May 17	at Mississippi State	No. 1	Dudy Noble Field; Starkville, MS	3–6	Self (3–0)	**Byrne** (2–1)	None	5,100	41–13	20–8
May 18	at Mississippi State	No. 1	Dudy Noble Field	4–12	France (4–3)	**Leftwich** (4–4)	None	5,901	41–14	20–9
May 19	at Mississippi State	No. 1	Dudy Noble Field	6–13	Smith (4–0)	**Kowar** (9–3)	Gordon (3)	6,291	41–15	20–10

Postseason
SEC Tournament

Date	Opponent	Rank	Stadium Site	Score	Win	Loss	Save	Attendance	Overall Record	SECT Record
May 23	vs. (8) LSU	No. 3 (1)	Metropolitan Stadium; Hoover, AL	4–3	**Mace** (4–0)	Hilliard (9–5)	**Byrne** (13)	6,710	42–15	1–0
May 24	vs. No. 7 (4) Arkansas	No. 3 (1)	Metropolitan Stadium	Postponed (rain) Makeup: May 25						
May 25 (1)	vs. No. 7 (4) Arkansas	No. 3 (1)	Metropolitan Stadium	2–8	Knight (10–0)	**Kowar** (9–4)	Cronin (11)	1,384	42–16	1–1
May 25 (2)^{[c]}	vs. (8) LSU	No. 3 (1)	Metropolitan Stadium	0–11^{7}	Beck (3–1)	**Leftwich** (4–5)	None	8,945	42–17	1–2
^{^[c]}The game was suspended during the sixth inning due to heavy fog and continued at 11:00 a.m. on May 26 prior to the start of the session scheduled for that day.

NCAA tournament: Gainesville Regional

Date	Opponent	Rank	Stadium Site	Score	Win	Loss	Save	Attendance	Overall Record	Regional Record
June 1	(4) Columbia	No. 1 (1)	McKethan Stadium	13–5	**Butler** (6–1)	Wiest (2–5)	None	2,823	43–17	1–0
June 2	(2) Jacksonville	No. 1 (1)	McKethan Stadium	3–2	**Singer** (11–1)	Stockton (8–6)	**Byrne** (14)	3,874	44–17	2–0
June 3	(3) Florida Atlantic	No. 1 (1)	McKethan Stadium	Postponed (rain) Makeup: June 4						
June 4 (1)	(3) Florida Atlantic	No. 1 (1)	McKethan Stadium	4–7	Schneider (7–1)	**Kowar** (9–5)	Peden (4)	2,883	44–18	2–1
June 4 (2)	(3) Florida Atlantic	No. 1 (1)	McKethan Stadium	5–2	**Mace** (5–0)	Poore (2–2)	**Byrne** (15)	2,033	45–18	3–1

NCAA tournament: Gainesville Super Regional

Date	Opponent	Rank	Stadium Site	Score	Win	Loss	Save	Attendance	Overall Record	Super Reg. Record
June 9	No. 19 Auburn	No. 1 (1)	McKethan Stadium	8–2	**Singer** (12–1)	Mize (10–6)	None	4,610	46–18	1–0
June 10	No. 19 Auburn	No. 1 (1)	McKethan Stadium	2–3	Greenhill (6–2)	**Butler** (6–2)	None	4,537	46–19	1–1
June 11	No. 19 Auburn	No. 1 (1)	McKethan Stadium	3–2^{11}	**Byrne** (3–1)	Greenhill (6–3)	None	5,958	47–19	2–1

NCAA tournament: College World Series

Date	Opponent	Rank	Stadium Site	Score	Win	Loss	Save	Attendance	Overall Record	CWS Record
June 17	vs. No. 11 (9) Texas Tech	No. 1 (1)	TD Ameritrade Park; Omaha, NE	3–6	Shetter (6–0)	**Singer** (12–2)	None	19,100	47–20	0–1
June 19	vs. No. 16 (13) Texas	No. 1 (1)	TD Ameritrade Park	6–1	**Kowar** (10–5)	Henley (6–7)	None	16,620	48–20	1–1
June 21	vs. No. 11 (9) Texas Tech	No. 1 (1)	TD Ameritrade Park	9–6	**Leftwich** (5–5)	Kilian (9–3)	**Byrne** (16)	24,806	49–20	2–1
June 22	vs. No. 6 (3) Arkansas	No. 1 (1)	TD Ameritrade Park	2–5	Campbell (5–6)	**Singer** (12–3)	Cronin (13)	25,016	49–21	2–2

Rankings from USA Today/ESPN Top 25 coaches' baseball poll. All times Eastern. Parentheses indicate tournament seedings. Retrieved from FloridaGators.com

== Record vs. conference opponents ==
Last two do not qualify for conf. tourn. Blank are not scheduled. Blue are home games, otherwise away.

2018 SEC baseball records Source: 2018 SEC baseball game results
Team	W–L	ALA	ARK	AUB	FLA	UGA	KEN	LSU	MSU	MIZZ	MISS	SCAR	TENN	TAMU	VAN	Team	Div	SR	SW
ALA	8–22		0–3	0–3	.	1–2	2–1	1–2	1–2	2–1	1–2	.	0–3	0–3	.	ALA	W7	2–8	0–4
ARK	18–12	3–0		3–0	1–2	1–2	3–0	1–2	0–3	.	1–2	2–1	.	3–0	.	ARK	W2	5–5	4–1
AUB	15–15	3–0	0–3		1–2	.	1–2	2–1	2–1	1–2	0–3	.	.	2–1	3–0	AUB	W3	5–5	2–2
FLA	20–10	.	2–1	2–1		2–1	2–1	.	0–3	3–0	.	2–1	2–1	2–1	3–0	FLA	E1	9–1	2–1
UGA	18–12	2–1	2–1	.	1–2		1–2	.	.	3–0	1–2	3–0	2–1	2–1	1–2	UGA	E2	6–4	2–0
KEN	13–17	1–2	0–3	2–1	1–2	2–1		.	2–1	2–1	.	2–1	1–2	.	0–3	KEN	E5	5–5	0–2
LSU	15–15	2–1	2–1	1–2	.	.	.		2–1	2–1	1–2	0–3	3–0	1–2	1–2	LSU	W4	5–5	1–1
MSU	15–15	2–1	3–0	1–2	3–0	.	1–2	1–2		1–2	2–1	.	.	1–2	0–3	MSU	W5	4–6	2–1
MIZZ	12–18	1–2	.	2–1	0–3	0–3	1–2	1–2	2–1		.	1–2	2–1	.	2–1	MIZZ	E6	4–6	0–2
MISS	18–12	2–1	2–1	3–0	.	2–1	.	2–1	1–2	.		1–2	2–1	2–1	1–2	MISS	W1	7–3	1–0
SCAR	17–13	.	1–2	.	1–2	0–3	1–2	3–0	.	2–1	2–1		3–0	2–1	2–1	SCAR	E3	6–4	2–1
TENN	12–18	3–0	.	.	1–2	1–2	2–1	0–3	.	1–2	1–2	0–3		2–1	1–2	TENN	E7	3–7	1–2
TAMU	13–17	3–0	0–3	1–2	1–2	1–2	.	2–1	2–1	.	1–2	1–2	1–2		.	TAMU	W6	3–7	1–1
VAN	16–14	.	.	0–3	0–3	2–1	3–0	2–1	3–0	1–2	2–1	1–2	2–1	.		VAN	E4	6–4	2–2
Team	W–L	ALA	ARK	AUB	FLA	UGA	KEN	LSU	MSU	MIZZ	MISS	SCAR	TENN	TAMU	VAN	Team	Div	SR	SW

Updated for entire regular season.

== Rankings ==
Ranking movements Legend: ██ Increase in ranking ██ Decrease in ranking ( ) = First-place votes
	Week																		
Poll	Pre	1	2	3	4	5	6	7	8	9	10	11	12	13	14	15	16	17	Final
Coaches'	1 (26)	1 (26)*	1 (26)*	1 (19)	2 (3)	2	2 (2)	1 (26)	1 (29)	1 (30)	1 (19)	1 (19)	1 (19)	1 (30)	3 (12)	1 (15)	1 (15)*	1(15)*	3
Baseball America	1	1	1	1	2	2	2	1	1	1	1	1	1	1	1	1	1*	1*	3
Collegiate Baseball^	1	1	2	2	6	4	3	1	1	1	2	2	2	1	2	4	2	2	3
NCBWA†	1	1	1	1	2	2	2	1	1	1	2	2	2	1	3	4	2	2*	3

^ Collegiate Baseball ranked 40 teams in their preseason poll, but only ranked 30 teams weekly during the season.
† NCBWA ranks 30 teams in their preseason poll, but only ranks 25 teams weekly during the season.
* A new poll was not released for this week, so for comparison purposes, the previous week's ranking is inserted in this week's slot.
