= 2018 Mississippi State Bulldogs baseball team =

American college baseball season

2018 Mississippi State Bulldogs baseball

Tallahassee Regional champions Nashville Super Regional champions

College World Series, 3rd (tie)
- Conference: Southeastern Conference
- Western Division
- CB: No. 4
- Record: 39–29 (15–15 SEC)
- Head coach: Andy Cannizaro (first 3 games), Gary Henderson
- Home stadium: Dudy Noble Field, Polk–DeMent Stadium

2018 Southeastern Conference baseball standings
| | Conf. | | | | Overall |
| Team | W | | L | PCT | W | | L | PCT |
|---|---|---|---|---|---|---|---|---|
East Division
| No. 3 Florida ^{x}‍†‍‍^{y} | 20 | – | 10 | .667 | 49 | – | 21 | .700 |
| No. 20 Georgia ‍‍‍^{y} | 18 | – | 12 | .600 | 39 | – | 21 | .650 |
| No. 12 South Carolina ‍‍‍^{y} | 17 | – | 13 | .567 | 37 | – | 26 | .587 |
| No. 16 Vanderbilt ‍‍‍^{y} | 16 | – | 14 | .533 | 35 | – | 27 | .565 |
| Kentucky ‍‍‍ | 13 | – | 17 | .433 | 34 | – | 22 | .607 |
| Missouri ‍‍‍ | 12 | – | 18 | .400 | 34 | – | 22 | .607 |
| Tennessee ‍‍‍ | 12 | – | 18 | .400 | 29 | – | 27 | .518 |
West Division
| No. 19 Ole Miss ^{x}‍‍‡‍^{y} | 18 | – | 12 | .600 | 48 | – | 18 | .727 |
| No. 2 Arkansas ^{x}‍‍‍^{y} | 18 | – | 12 | .600 | 48 | – | 21 | .696 |
| No. 15 Auburn ‍‍‍^{y} | 15 | – | 15 | .500 | 43 | – | 23 | .652 |
| LSU ‍‍‍^{y} | 15 | – | 15 | .500 | 39 | – | 27 | .591 |
| No. 4 Mississippi State ‍‍‍^{y} | 15 | – | 15 | .500 | 39 | – | 29 | .574 |
| Texas A&M ‍‍‍^{y} | 13 | – | 17 | .433 | 40 | – | 22 | .645 |
| Alabama ‍‍‍ | 8 | – | 22 | .267 | 27 | – | 29 | .482 |
x – Division champion † – Conference champion ‡ – Tournament champion y – Invited to the NCAA tournament Rankings from Collegiate Baseball

The 2018 Mississippi State Bulldogs baseball team represented the Mississippi State University in the 2018 NCAA Division I baseball season. The Bulldogs played their home games at Dudy Noble Field. Due to construction of the new Dudy Noble Field, the first home game was not played until March 6, to give construction crews time to finish the bottom seating of the stadium. The new Dudy Noble Field in its entirety was not completed until the 2019 season.

== Personnel ==
=== Coaching staff ===
2018 Mississippi State Bulldogs coaching staff
- Andy Cannizaro – Head Coach (first 3 games) – 2nd year
- Gary Henderson – Pitching Coach – 2nd year; Interim Head Coach (starting game 4)
- Jake Gautreau – Assistant Coach – 1st year
- Mike Brown – Coordinator of Camps/Volunteer Assistant – 2nd year
- A.J. Gaura – Coordinator of Baseball Player Development – 1st year
- Trevor Fitts – Coordinator of Baseball Operations – 1st year
- Justin Aguiar – Coordinator of Video & Analytics - 1st year

== Schedule and results ==
2018 Mississippi State Bulldogs baseball game log
Regular season (31–24)

February (3–5)
| Date | Opponent | Rank | Site/stadium | Score | Win | Loss | Save | TV | Attendance | Overall record | SEC record |
|---|---|---|---|---|---|---|---|---|---|---|---|
| Feb. 16 | at #25 Southern Miss | #13 | Pete Taylor Park • Hattiesburg, MS | L 0–11 | Nick Sandlin (1–0) | Konnor Pilkington (0–1) | none | | 4,948 | 0–1 | – |
| Feb. 17 | at #25 Southern Miss | #13 | Pete Taylor Park • Hattiesburg, MS | L 4–7 | Jarod Wright (1–0) | Ethan Small (0–1) | none | | 4,988 | 0–2 | – |
| Feb. 18 | at #25 Southern Miss | #13 | Pete Taylor Park • Hattiesburg, MS | L 2–5 | Jacob Weirich (1–0) | Zach Neff (0–1) | Matt Wallner (1) | | 4,970 | 0–3 | – |
| Feb. 21 | at Jackson State | | Braddy Field • Jackson, MS | W 12–1 | JP France (1–0) | Mark Watson (0–1) | none | | 347 | 1–3 | – |
| Feb. 23 | vs. UC Santa Barbara; Kleberg Bank College Classic | | Whataburger Field • Corpus Christi, TX | W 7–4 | Konnor Pilkington (1–1) | Jack Dashwood (0–1) | Blake Smith (1) | | 1,761 | 2–3 | – |
| Feb. 24 | vs. Nicholls State; Kleberg Bank College Classic | | Whataburger Field • Corpus Christi, TX | W 14–4 | Ethan Small (1–1) | Parker White (0–1) | Denver McQuary (1) | | 1,134 | 3–3 | – |
| Feb. 25 | at Texas A&M–Corpus Christi; Kleberg Bank College Classic | | Whataburger Field • Corpus Christi, TX | L 3–6 | Chad Romere (1–0) | Zach Neff (0–2) | Chris Cooper (2) | | 1,898 | 3–4 | – |
| Feb. 26 | at Texas Rio Grande Valley | | UTRGV Baseball Stadium • Edinburg, TX | Canceled in bottom 4th, heavy fog | | | | | | | |
| Feb. 28 | at McNeese State | | Cowboy Diamond • Lake Charles, LA | L 3–6 | Tyler Wesley (1–1) | Keegan James (0–1) | Grant Anderson (1) | | 1,843 | 3–5 | – |

March (11–10)
| Date | Opponent | Rank | Site/stadium | Score | Win | Loss | Save | TV | Attendance | Overall record | SEC record |
|---|---|---|---|---|---|---|---|---|---|---|---|
| Mar. 2 | vs. Louisiana; Shriners College Classic | | Minute Maid Park • Houston, TX | W 3–1 | Cole Gordon (1–0) | Brock Batty (2–1) | none | | 4,972 | 4–5 | – |
| Mar. 3 | vs. Houston; Shriners College Classic | | Minute Maid Park • Houston, TX | W 3–2 ^{12} | Blake Smith (1–0) | Brayson Hurdsman (0–1) | none | | 6,796 | 5–5 | – |
| Mar. 4 | vs. Sam Houston State; Shriners College Classic | | Minute Maid Park • Houston, TX | W 4–1 | Jacob Billingsley (1–0) | Seth Ballew (0–1) | Cole Gordon (1) | | 5,414 | 6–5 | – |
| Mar. 6 | New Mexico State | | Dudy Noble Field • Starkville, MS | W 9–1 | Cole Marsh (1–0) | Brock Whittlesey (1–3) | Denver McQuary (2) | SECN+ | 7,179 | 7–5 | – |
| Mar. 7 | New Mexico State | | Dudy Noble Field • Starkville, MS | W 6–0 | Zach Neff (1–2) | Alex Pinedo (0–1) | none | SECN+ | 5,117 | 8–5 | – |
| Mar. 9 | Utah Valley (DH-1) | | Dudy Noble Field • Starkville, MS | L 1–2 ^{11} | Fabian Palacios (1–0) | Cole Gordon (1–1) | Drew Hill (3) | SECN+ | 5,468 | 8–6 | – |
| Mar. 9 | Utah Valley (DH-2) | | Dudy Noble Field • Starkville, MS | W 4–2 | Keegan James (1–1) | Ondrej Sebek (0–1) | Blake Smith (2) | SECN+ | 5,468 | 9–6 | – |
| Mar. 10 | Utah Valley | | Dudy Noble Field • Starkville, MS | Moved to 3/9, impending weather | | | | | | | |
| Mar. 11 | Utah Valley | | Dudy Noble Field • Starkville, MS | W 5–3 | Jacob Billingsley (2–0) | Walker Ramsey (1–3) | JP France (1) | SECN+ | 4,727 | 10–6 | – |
| Mar. 14 | vs. Southeastern Louisiana | | MGM Park • Biloxi, MS | L 5–11 | Corey Gaconi (1–0) | Keegan James (1–2) | none | | 3,318 | 10–7 | – |
| Mar. 16 | #11 Vanderbilt | | Dudy Noble Field • Starkville, MS | L 0–5 | Drake Fellows (3–0) | Konnor Pilkington (1–2) | Zach King (1) | SECN | 4,860 | 10–8 | 0–1 |
| Mar. 17 | #11 Vanderbilt | | Dudy Noble Field • Starkville, MS | L 1–10 | Patrick Raby (2–2) | Ethan Small (1–2) | none | SECN+ | 6,218 | 10–9 | 0–2 |
| Mar. 18 | #11 Vanderbilt | | Dudy Noble Field • Starkville, MS | L 3–4 | Mason Hickman (4–0) | Jacob Billingsley (2–1) | Tyler Brown (2) | SECN+ | 4,569 | 10–10 | 0–3 |
| Mar. 20 | Alcorn State | | Dudy Noble Field • Starkville, MS | W 17–1 | Zach Neff (2–2) | Regynold Johnson (0–1) | none | SECN+ | 4,295 | 11–10 | – |
| Mar. 21 | Texas Southern | | Dudy Noble Field • Starkville, MS | W 11–6 | Cole Gordon (2–1) | Peyton Schneider (0–5) | none | SECN+ | 4,713 | 12–10 | – |
| Mar. 23 | at #25 Missouri | | Taylor Stadium • Columbia, MO | L 1–4 | T. J. Sikkema (2–0) | Konnor Pilkington (1–3) | Andy Toelken (1) | SECN+ | 406 | 12–11 | 0–4 |
| Mar. 24 | at #25 Missouri | | Taylor Stadium • Columbia, MO | W 3–1 ^{15} | Blake Smith (2–0) | Tyler LaPlante (3–1) | none | SECN+ | 406 | 13–11 | 1–4 |
| Mar. 25 | at #25 Missouri | | Taylor Stadium • Columbia, MO | L 4–5 ^{11} | Andy Toelken (3–2) | JP France (1–1) | none | SECN+ | 496 | 13–12 | 1–5 |
| Mar. 27 | at Nicholls State | | Ray E. Didier Field • Thibodaux, LA | L 4–7 | Bryan Taylor (2–3) | Denver McQuary (0–1) | none | | 674 | 13–13 | – |
| Mar. 29 | at #19 LSU | | Alex Box Stadium, Skip Bertman Field • Baton Rouge, LA | L 1–10 | Zack Hess (4–3) | Konnor Pilkington (1–4) | none | SECN | 10,532 | 13–14 | 1–6 |
| Mar. 30 | at #19 LSU | | Alex Box Stadium, Skip Bertman Field • Baton Rouge, LA | W 4–1 | Ethan Small (2–2) | Caleb Gilbert (3–2) | Cole Gordon (2) | SECN+ | 11,132 | 14–14 | 2–6 |
| Mar. 31 | at #19 LSU | | Alex Box Stadium, Skip Bertman Field • Baton Rouge, LA | L 0–4 | Ma'Khail Hilliard (6–1) | Jacob Billingsley (2–2) | Nick Bush (1) | SECN+ | 11,133 | 14–15 | 2–7 |

April (10–6)
| Date | Opponent | Rank | Site/stadium | Score | Win | Loss | Save | TV | Attendance | Overall record | SEC record |
|---|---|---|---|---|---|---|---|---|---|---|---|
| April 4 | Southern | | Dudy Noble Field • Starkville, MS | W 5–0 | Riley Self (1–0) | John Guienze (0–2) | none | SECN+ | 4,886 | 15–15 | – |
| April 6 | #5 Ole Miss | | Dudy Noble Field • Starkville, MS | Postponed to 4/7, inclement weather | | | | | | | |
| April 7 | #5 Ole Miss (DH-1) | | Dudy Noble Field • Starkville, MS | W 13–3 | Konnor Pilkington (2–4) | Brady Feigl (6–2) | none | SECN+ | 6,168 | 16–15 | 3–7 |
| April 7 | #5 Ole Miss (DH-2) | | Dudy Noble Field • Starkville, MS | L 1–6 | Ryan Rolison (4–3) | Ethan Small (2–3) | none | SECN+ | 6,168 | 16–16 | 3–8 |
| April 8 | #5 Ole Miss | | Dudy Noble Field • Starkville, MS | W 7–5 ^{11} | Blake Smith (3–0) | Will Stokes (1–1) | none | SECN+ | 6,059 | 17–16 | 4–8 |
| April 11 | at Alabama State | | Wheeler–Watkins Baseball Complex • Montgomery, AL | W 15–4 | Denver McQuary (1–1) | Ivanniel Vazquez (1–4) | none | | 1,502 | 18–16 | – |
| April 13 | at Auburn | | Plainsman Park • Auburn, AL | L 1–2 | Casey Mize (7–1) | Konnor Pilkington (2–5) | none | SECN | 3,831 | 18–17 | 4–9 |
| April 14 | at Auburn | | Plainsman Park • Auburn, AL | W 7–2 | Ethan Small (3–3) | Davis Daniel (2–3) | none | SECN+ | 4,045 | 19–17 | 5–9 |
| April 15 | at Auburn | | Plainsman Park • Auburn, AL | L 5–7 | Cody Greenhill (2–1) | Cole Gordon (2–2) | none | SECN+ | 2,904 | 19–18 | 5–10 |
| April 18 | vs. Memphis | | AutoZone Park • Memphis, TN | L 1–6 | Connor Alexander (2–2) | Denver McQuary (1–2) | Hunter Smith (2) | | 3,027 | 19–19 | – |
| April 20 | #6 Arkansas; Super Bulldog Weekend | | Dudy Noble Field • Starkville, MS | W 6–5 | JP France (2–1) | Matt Cronin (2–1) | none | SECN+ | 7,303 | 20–19 | 6–10 |
| April 21 | #6 Arkansas (DH-1); Super Bulldog Weekend | | Dudy Noble Field • Starkville, MS | W 5–3 | Ethan Small (4–3) | Kacey Murphy (5–3) | Blake Smith (3) | SECN+ | 10,147 | 21–19 | 7–10 |
| April 21 | #6 Arkansas (DH-2); Super Bulldog Weekend | | Dudy Noble Field • Starkville, MS | W 7–5 | Jacob Billingsley (3–2) | Isaiah Campbell (3–4) | Zach Neff (1) | SECN+ | 10,147 | 22–19 | 8–10 |
| April 22 | #6 Arkansas; Super Bulldog Weekend | | Dudy Noble Field • Starkville, MS | Moved to 4/21, impending weather | | | | | | | |
| April 24 | vs. #8 Ole Miss; Governor's Cup | | Trustmark Park • Pearl, MS | W 7–6 | Cole Gordon (3–2) | Parker Caracci (2–2) | none | SECN | 8,515 | 23–19 | – |
| April 27 | #22 Texas A&M | | Dudy Noble Field • Starkville, MS | L 3–6 | Kaylor Chafin (3–0) | JP France (2–2) | Nolan Hoffman (8) | SECN+ | 5,784 | 23–20 | 8–11 |
| April 28 | #22 Texas A&M | | Dudy Noble Field • Starkville, MS | W 11–6 | Ethan Small (5–3) | John Doxakis (6–2) | Zach Neff (2) | SECN+ | 7,017 | 24–20 | 9–11 |
| April 29 | #22 Texas A&M | | Dudy Noble Field • Starkville, MS | L 4–7 | Stephen Kolek (4–4) | Jacob Billingsley (3–3) | Nolan Hoffman (9) | SECN | 5,555 | 24–21 | 9–12 |

May (7–3)
| Date | Opponent | Rank | Site/stadium | Score | Win | Loss | Save | TV | Attendance | Overall record | SEC record |
|---|---|---|---|---|---|---|---|---|---|---|---|
| May 4 | at Alabama | | Sewell–Thomas Stadium • Tuscaloosa, AL | W 14–12 ^{10} | Zach Neff (3–2) | Deacon Medders (0–3) | none | SECN+ | 3,411 | 25–21 | 10–12 |
| May 5 | at Alabama | | Sewell–Thomas Stadium • Tuscaloosa, AL | L 3–4 ^{10} | Sam Gardner (2–2) | Cole Gordon (3–3) | none | SECN+ | 4,631 | 25–22 | 10–13 |
| May 6 | at Alabama | | Sewell–Thomas Stadium • Tuscaloosa, AL | W 6–4 | JP France (3–2) | Kyle Cameron (1–2) | none | ESPNU | 4,637 | 26–22 | 11–13 |
| May 9 | vs. Troy | | Hoover Metropolitan Stadium • Hoover, AL | W 9–8 ^{10} | Riley Self (2–0) | CJ Carter (6–4) | none | | 2,562 | 27–22 | – |
| May 11 | at Kentucky | | Cliff Hagan Stadium • Lexington, KY | L 6–9 | Sean Hjelle (7–4) | Konnor Pilkington (2–6) | Chris Machamer (10) | ESPNU | 4,303 | 27–23 | 11–14 |
| May 12 | at Kentucky | | Cliff Hagan Stadium • Lexington, KY | L 1–4 | Jimmy Ramsey (3–1) | JP France (3–3) | none | SECN | 4,416 | 27–24 | 11–15 |
| May 13 | at Kentucky | | Cliff Hagan Stadium • Lexington, KY | W 18–8 | Jacob Billingsley (4–3) | Brad Schaenzer (1–2) | none | SECN | 4,096 | 28–24 | 12–15 |
| May 17 | #1 Florida | | Dudy Noble Field • Starkville, MS | W 6–3 | Riley Self (3–0) | Michael Byrne (2–1) | none | SECN+ | 5,100 | 29–24 | 13–15 |
| May 18 | #1 Florida | | Dudy Noble Field • Starkville, MS | W 12–4 | JP France (4–3) | Jack Leftwich (4–4) | none | ESPNU | 5,901 | 30–24 | 14–15 |
| May 19 | #1 Florida | | Dudy Noble Field • Starkville, MS | W 13–6 | Blake Smith (1–0) | Jackson Kowar (9–3) | Cole Gordon (3) | ESPNU | 6,291 | 31–24 | 15–15 |

Post-season (8–5)

SEC Tournament (0–1)
| Date | Opponent | Seed/Rank | Site/stadium | Score | Win | Loss | Save | TV | Attendance | Overall record | SECT Record |
|---|---|---|---|---|---|---|---|---|---|---|---|
| May 22 | vs. (8) LSU | (9) | Hoover Metropolitan Stadium • Hoover, AL | L 5–8 | Devin Fontenot (2–0) | JP France (4–4) | Todd Peterson (5) | SECN | 8,072 | 31–25 | 0–1 |

NCAA Tallahassee Regional (4–1)
| Date | Opponent | Seed/Rank | Site/stadium | Score | Win | Loss | Save | TV | Attendance | Overall record | NCAAT record |
|---|---|---|---|---|---|---|---|---|---|---|---|
| June 1 | vs. (3) Oklahoma | (2) | Dick Howser Stadium • Tallahassee, FL | L 10–20 | Kyle Tyler (6–2) | JP France (4–5) | none | ESPNU | 3,238 | 31–26 | 0–1 |
| June 2 | at (1) #15 Florida State | (2) | Dick Howser Stadium • Tallahassee, FL | W 3–2 | Riley Self (4–0) | Drew Parrish (5–1) | none | ESPN2 | 3,319 | 32–26 | 1–1 |
| June 3 | vs. (4) Samford (DH-1) | (2) | Dick Howser Stadium • Tallahassee, FL | W 9–8 | Jacob Billingsley (5–3) | Wyatt Burns (5–4) | JP France (2) | ESPN2 | 3,196 | 33–26 | 2–1 |
| June 3 | vs. (3) Oklahoma (DH-2) | (2) | Dick Howser Stadium • Tallahassee, FL | W 13–5 | Cole Gordon (4–3) | Devon Perez (5–6) | none | ESPNU | 3,109 | 34–26 | 3–1 |
| June 4 | vs. (3) Oklahoma | (2) | Dick Howser Stadium • Tallahassee, FL | W 8–1 | JP France (5–5) | Levi Prater (3–4) | Riley Self (1) | ESPN2 | 3,103 | 35–26 | 4–1 |

NCAA Nashville Super Regional (2–1)
| Date | Opponent | Rank | Site/stadium | Score | Win | Loss | Save | TV | Attendance | Overall record | NCAAT record |
|---|---|---|---|---|---|---|---|---|---|---|---|
| June 8 | at #15 Vanderbilt | #16 | Hawkins Field • Nashville, TN | W 10–8 | Riley Self (5–0) | Zach King (1–4) | none | ESPN2 | 3,626 | 36–26 | 5–1 |
| June 9 | at #15 Vanderbilt | #16 | Hawkins Field • Nashville, TN | L 3–4 | Chandler Day (2–1) | Zach Neff (3–3) | none | ESPN | 3,626 | 36–27 | 5–2 |
| June 10 | at #15 Vanderbilt | #16 | Hawkins Field • Nashville, TN | W 10–6 ^{11} | Denver McQuary (2–2) | Tyler Brown (1–5) | none | ESPN2 | 3,626 | 37–27 | 6–2 |

College World Series (2–2)
| Date | Opponent | Rank | Site/stadium | Score | Win | Loss | Save | TV | Attendance | Overall record | CWS record |
|---|---|---|---|---|---|---|---|---|---|---|---|
| June 16 | vs. #7 Washington | #8 | TD Ameritrade Park • Omaha, NE | W 1–0 | Zach Neff (4–3) | Alex Hardy (5–3) | none | ESPN | 24,758 | 38–27 | 1–0 |
| June 18 | vs. (6) #3 North Carolina | #8 | TD Ameritrade Park • Omaha, NE | Postponed to 6/19, inclement weather | | | | | | | |
| June 19 | vs. (6) #3 North Carolina | #8 | TD Ameritrade Park • Omaha, NE | W 12–2 | Konnor Pilkington (3–6) | Austin Bergner (7–3) | Cole Gordon (4) | ESPN2 | 13,387 | 39–27 | 2–0 |
| June 22 | vs. (3) #1 Oregon State | #8 | TD Ameritrade Park • Omaha, NE | L 2–12 | Brandon Eisert (5–3) | Jacob Billingsley (5–4) | none | ESPN | 21,002 | 39–28 | 2–1 |
| June 23 | vs. (3) #1 Oregon State | #8 | TD Ameritrade Park • Omaha, NE | L 2–5 | Kevin Abel (6–1) | Ethan Small (5–4) | none | ESPN | 21,821 | 39–29 | 2–2 |

† Indicates the game does not count toward the 2018 Southeastern Conference standings.
*Rankings are based on the team's current ranking in the Collegiate Baseball poll.

== Record vs. conference opponents ==
Last two do not qualify for conf. tourn. Blank are not scheduled. Blue are home games, otherwise away.

2018 SEC baseball records Source: 2018 SEC baseball game results
| Team | W–L | ALA | ARK | AUB | FLA | UGA | KEN | LSU | MSU | MIZZ | MISS | SCAR | TENN | TAMU | VAN | Team | Div | SR | SW |
|---|---|---|---|---|---|---|---|---|---|---|---|---|---|---|---|---|---|---|---|
| ALA | 8–22 | | 0–3 | 0–3 | . | 1–2 | 2–1 | 1–2 | 1–2 | 2–1 | 1–2 | . | 0–3 | 0–3 | . | ALA | W7 | 2–8 | 0–4 |
| ARK | 18–12 | 3–0 | | 3–0 | 1–2 | 1–2 | 3–0 | 1–2 | 0–3 | . | 1–2 | 2–1 | . | 3–0 | . | ARK | W2 | 5–5 | 4–1 |
| AUB | 15–15 | 3–0 | 0–3 | | 1–2 | . | 1–2 | 2–1 | 2–1 | 1–2 | 0–3 | . | . | 2–1 | 3–0 | AUB | W3 | 5–5 | 2–2 |
| FLA | 20–10 | . | 2–1 | 2–1 | | 2–1 | 2–1 | . | 0–3 | 3–0 | . | 2–1 | 2–1 | 2–1 | 3–0 | FLA | E1 | 9–1 | 2–1 |
| UGA | 18–12 | 2–1 | 2–1 | . | 1–2 | | 1–2 | . | . | 3–0 | 1–2 | 3–0 | 2–1 | 2–1 | 1–2 | UGA | E2 | 6–4 | 2–0 |
| KEN | 13–17 | 1–2 | 0–3 | 2–1 | 1–2 | 2–1 | | . | 2–1 | 2–1 | . | 2–1 | 1–2 | . | 0–3 | KEN | E5 | 5–5 | 0–2 |
| LSU | 15–15 | 2–1 | 2–1 | 1–2 | . | . | . | | 2–1 | 2–1 | 1–2 | 0–3 | 3–0 | 1–2 | 1–2 | LSU | W4 | 5–5 | 1–1 |
| MSU | 15–15 | 2–1 | 3–0 | 1–2 | 3–0 | . | 1–2 | 1–2 | | 1–2 | 2–1 | . | . | 1–2 | 0–3 | MSU | W5 | 4–6 | 2–1 |
| MIZZ | 12–18 | 1–2 | . | 2–1 | 0–3 | 0–3 | 1–2 | 1–2 | 2–1 | | . | 1–2 | 2–1 | . | 2–1 | MIZZ | E6 | 4–6 | 0–2 |
| MISS | 18–12 | 2–1 | 2–1 | 3–0 | . | 2–1 | . | 2–1 | 1–2 | . | | 1–2 | 2–1 | 2–1 | 1–2 | MISS | W1 | 7–3 | 1–0 |
| SCAR | 17–13 | . | 1–2 | . | 1–2 | 0–3 | 1–2 | 3–0 | . | 2–1 | 2–1 | | 3–0 | 2–1 | 2–1 | SCAR | E3 | 6–4 | 2–1 |
| TENN | 12–18 | 3–0 | . | . | 1–2 | 1–2 | 2–1 | 0–3 | . | 1–2 | 1–2 | 0–3 | | 2–1 | 1–2 | TENN | E7 | 3–7 | 1–2 |
| TAMU | 13–17 | 3–0 | 0–3 | 1–2 | 1–2 | 1–2 | . | 2–1 | 2–1 | . | 1–2 | 1–2 | 1–2 | | . | TAMU | W6 | 3–7 | 1–1 |
| VAN | 16–14 | . | . | 0–3 | 0–3 | 2–1 | 3–0 | 2–1 | 3–0 | 1–2 | 2–1 | 1–2 | 2–1 | . | | VAN | E4 | 6–4 | 2–2 |
| Team | W–L | ALA | ARK | AUB | FLA | UGA | KEN | LSU | MSU | MIZZ | MISS | SCAR | TENN | TAMU | VAN | Team | Div | SR | SW |

Updated for entire regular season.

== Rankings ==
Ranking movements Legend: ██ Increase in ranking ██ Decrease in ranking — = Not ranked RV = Received votes
| | Week | | | | | | | | | | | | | | | | | |
| Poll | Pre | 1 | 2 | 3 | 4 | 5 | 6 | 7 | 8 | 9 | 10 | 11 | 12 | 13 | 14 | 15 | 16 | Final |
|---|---|---|---|---|---|---|---|---|---|---|---|---|---|---|---|---|---|---|
| Coaches' | 15 | 15* | 15* | RV | RV | — | — | — | — | — | — | — | — | RV | RV | RV* | RV* | 6 |
| Baseball America | — | — | — | — | — | — | — | — | — | — | — | — | — | 25 | — | —* | —* | 6 |
| Collegiate Baseball^ | 13 | — | — | — | — | — | — | — | — | — | — | — | — | — | — | 16 | 8 | 4 |
| NCBWA† | 17 | 25 | 27 | 26 | 21 | RV | RV | — | — | RV | — | RV | — | 28 | RV | 16 | 16* | 4 |

^ Collegiate Baseball ranked 40 teams in their preseason poll, but only ranked 30 teams weekly during the season.
† NCBWA ranks 30 teams in their preseason poll, but only ranks 25 teams weekly during the season.
* A new poll was not released for this week, so for comparison purposes, the previous week's ranking is inserted in this week's slot.

== MLB draft ==
| Player | Position | Round | Overall | MLB team |
|---|---|---|---|---|
| Konnor Pilkington | LHP | 3 | 81 | Chicago White Sox |
| J P France | RHP | 14 | 432 | Houston Astros |
| Hunter Stovall | 2B | 21 | 636 | Colorado Rockies |
| Ethan Small† | LHP | 26 | 789 | Arizona Diamondbacks |
| Zach Neff | LHP | 31 | 934 | Minnesota Twins |
| Jake Mangum‡ | LHP | 32 | 950 | New York Mets |
| Jacob Billingsley | RHP | 32 | 972 | Houston Astros |

†Small, a redshirt sophomore, returns to MSU for the next season.
‡Mangum, a junior, returns to MSU for the next season. Although Mangum had almost exclusively played CF in college and pitched very little, he was drafted as a pitcher.

== Recruiting ==
Mississippi State is ranked 8th by Perfect Game for its 2018 recruiting class, in spite of having two players, Carter Stewart and J. T. Ginn, both RHPs, go in the 1st round of the MLB draft and two more, Eric Cerantola and Sam Knowlton, both also RHPs, go in the 33rd and 39th, who did not sign to play professionally after this draft, although there is some speculation that Stewart may go JUCO instead. Stewart does go JUCO and after all teams have defections due to major league signings, Mississippi State is ranked 6th. Perfect Game only covers commitments out of high school. There is also a JUCO player, Gunner Halter, SS, taken in the 26th round who plans to play for Mississippi State. There are also two high schoolers that were not drafted, probably due to difficulty of being signed, who were projected as top 10 rounders, Hayden Jones, C, and Christian McLeod, LHP. In addition to the four RHPs, C, LHP, and JUCO SS mentioned above, high school players also include three OFs, a RHP, two SSs, and a C.
