= Grant Koch =

American baseball player (born 1997)

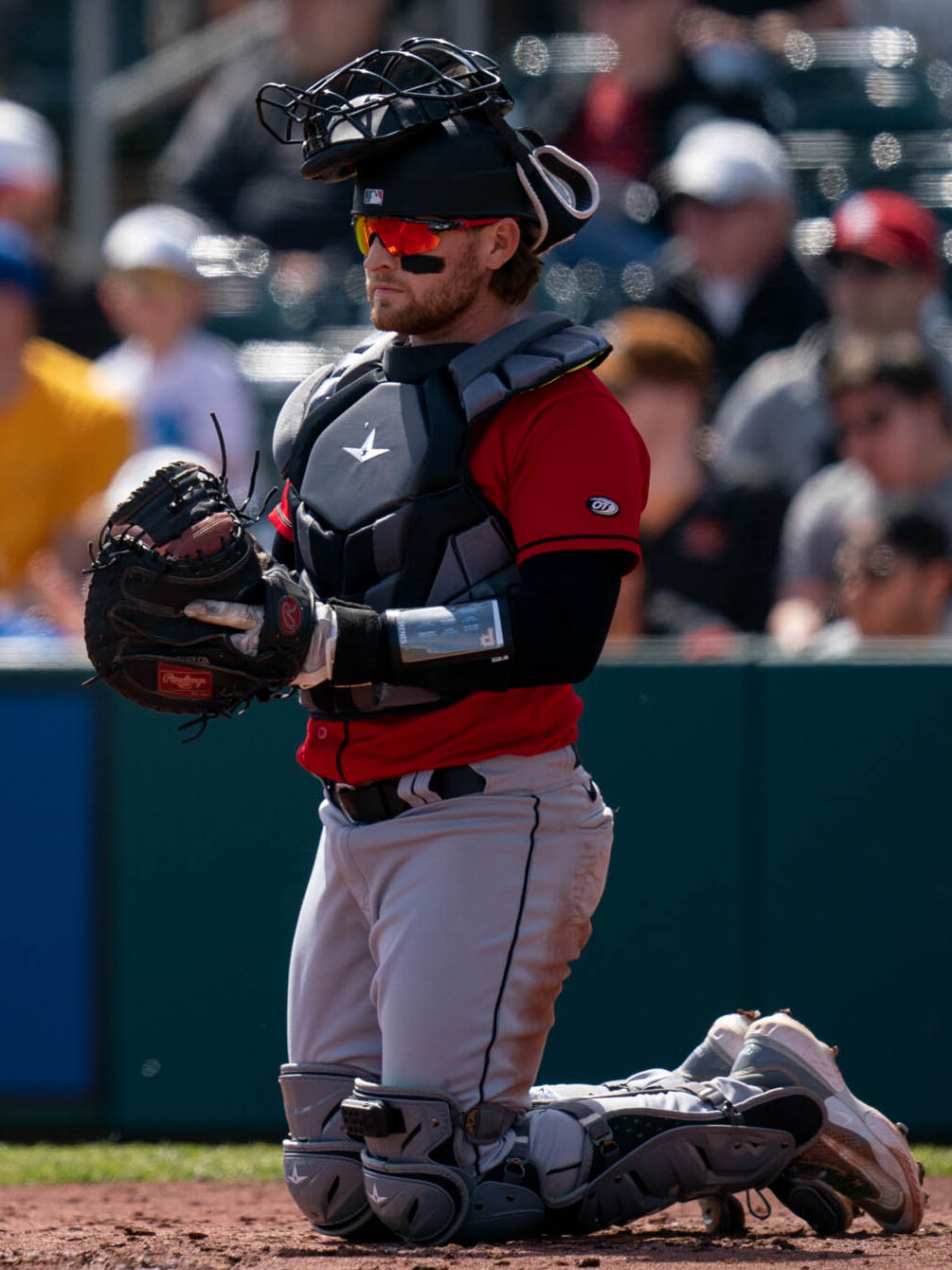
- Koch with the Indianapolis Indians in 2024
- Catcher
- Born: February 5, 1997 (age 29); Fayetteville, Arkansas, U.S.
- Batted: Right Threw: Right

MLB debut
- May 29, 2024, for the Pittsburgh Pirates

Last MLB appearance
- June 2, 2024, for the Pittsburgh Pirates

Career statistics
- Batting average: .000
- Home runs: 0
- Runs batted in: 0
- Stats at Baseball Reference

Teams
- Pittsburgh Pirates (2024)

Grant Koch (born February 5, 1997) is an American former professional baseball catcher. He played in Major League Baseball (MLB) for the Pittsburgh Pirates.

== Career ==
Koch played college baseball at Arkansas from 2016 to 2018.

Koch was drafted by the Pittsburgh Pirates in the 5th round, with the 144th overall selection, of the 2018 Major League Baseball draft, and signed for a $364,600 signing bonus. He made his professional debut with the Low–A West Virginia Black Bears, hitting .188/.304/.263 with two home runs and 11 RBI over 40 contests.

Koch spent 2019 with the Single–A Greensboro Grasshoppers, playing in 94 games and batting .202/.274/.318 with eight home runs and 34 RBI. He did not play in a game in 2020 due to the cancellation of the minor league season because of the COVID-19 pandemic. Koch returned to action in 2021 with Greensboro and the Double–A Altoona Curve, accumulating a .178/.259/.348 slash line with 10 home runs and 36 RBI across 70 games.

Koch split the 2022 campaign between Altoona and the Single–A Bradenton Marauders. In 32 total games, he hit a combined .202/.327/.255 with one home run and eight RBI. Koch spent the 2023 season with the Triple–A Indianapolis Indians, hitting .255/.318/.391 with five home runs and 23 RBI.

Koch began the 2024 season with the Triple–A Indianapolis Indians, hitting .167/.211/.259 with one home run and five RBI across 17 games. On May 28, 2024, Koch was selected to the 40-man roster and promoted to the major leagues for the first time. In three games for the Pirates, he went 0–for–7 with one walk. On June 4, Koch was designated for assignment by Pittsburgh. He cleared waivers and was sent outright to Indianapolis on June 6. Koch elected free agency following the season on November 4.
