= Michael Byrne (baseball) =

American baseball player (born 1997)

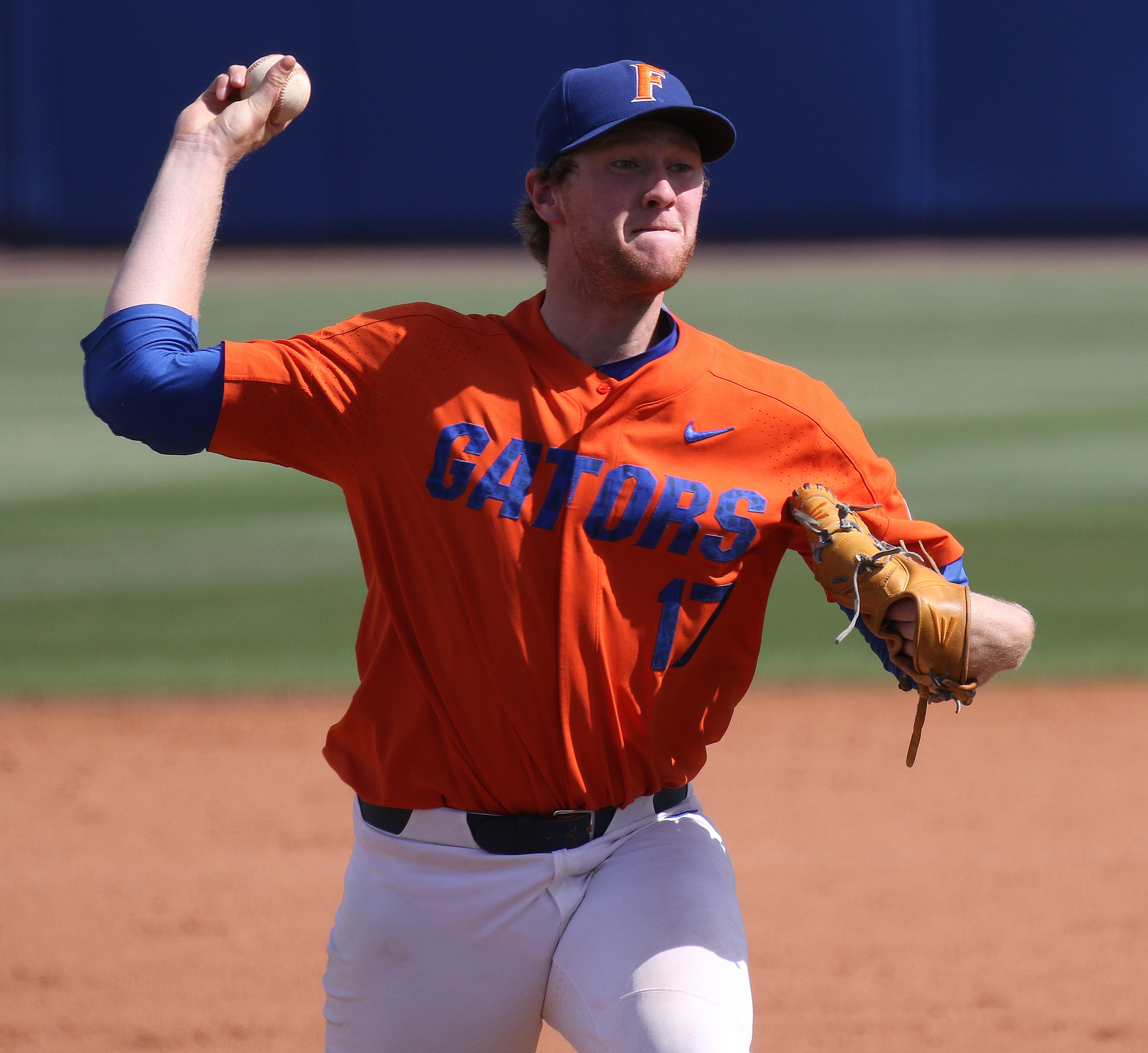
- Pitcher
- Born: April 16, 1997 (age 29); Orlando, Florida, U.S.
- Bats: Right Throws: Right
- Stats at Baseball Reference
Coaching career
Current position
| Title | Student assistant |
| Team | Florida |
| Conference | SEC |
Coaching career (HC unless noted)
| 2025– | Florida (Asst.) |

Michael Byrne (born April 16, 1997) is an American former professional baseball pitcher who currently serves as an assistant coach for the Florida Gators.

== Playing career ==
=== Amateur ===
Byrne attended Olympia High School in Orlando, Florida. He played for the school's baseball team as a starting pitcher. Byrne enrolled at the University of Florida to play college baseball for the Florida Gators. He became their closer in 2017, his sophomore year. After the 2017 season, he played collegiate summer baseball with the Cotuit Kettleers of the Cape Cod Baseball League. In 2018, Byrne won the Stopper of the Year Award.

=== Cincinnati Reds ===
The Cincinnati Reds selected Byrne in the 14th round, with the 409th overall selection, of the 2018 Major League Baseball draft. Byrne signed with the Reds and began his professional career with the Daytona Tortugas of the High-A Florida State League. In 21 2/3 innings relief innings, he went 1–1 with a 1.25 ERA. He returned to Daytona in 2019, going 7–3 with a 4.27 ERA over 37 games (six starts). Byrne did not play in a game in 2020 due to the cancellation of the minor league season because of the COVID-19 pandemic. He was assigned to the Double-A Chattanooga Lookouts to begin the 2021 season, logging a 5–5 record and 3.24 ERA with 38 strikeouts and two saves across 33 appearances.

In 2022, Byrne made 42 appearances split between Chattanooga and the Triple-A Louisville Bats. In 42 relief appearances for the two affiliates, he posted a combined 2–5 record and 4.55 ERA with 73 strikeouts and two saves across 61 1/3 innings pitched. Byrne returned to Chattanooga in 2023, pitching to a 4–1 record and 2.77 ERA with 63 strikeouts and two saves over 31 games out of the bullpen.

Byrne split the 2024 season between the rookie-level Arizona Complex League Reds, Single-A Daytona, and the Triple-A Louisville Bats. In 11 appearances for the three affiliates, he recorded a combined 5.06 ERA with 16 strikeouts and two saves across 10 2/3 innings pitched. Byrne elected free agency following the season on November 4, 2024.

== Coaching career ==
On January 29, 2025, Byrne returned to the Florida Gators as a student assistant on the coaching staff.
