= Blaine Knight =

American baseball player (born 1996)

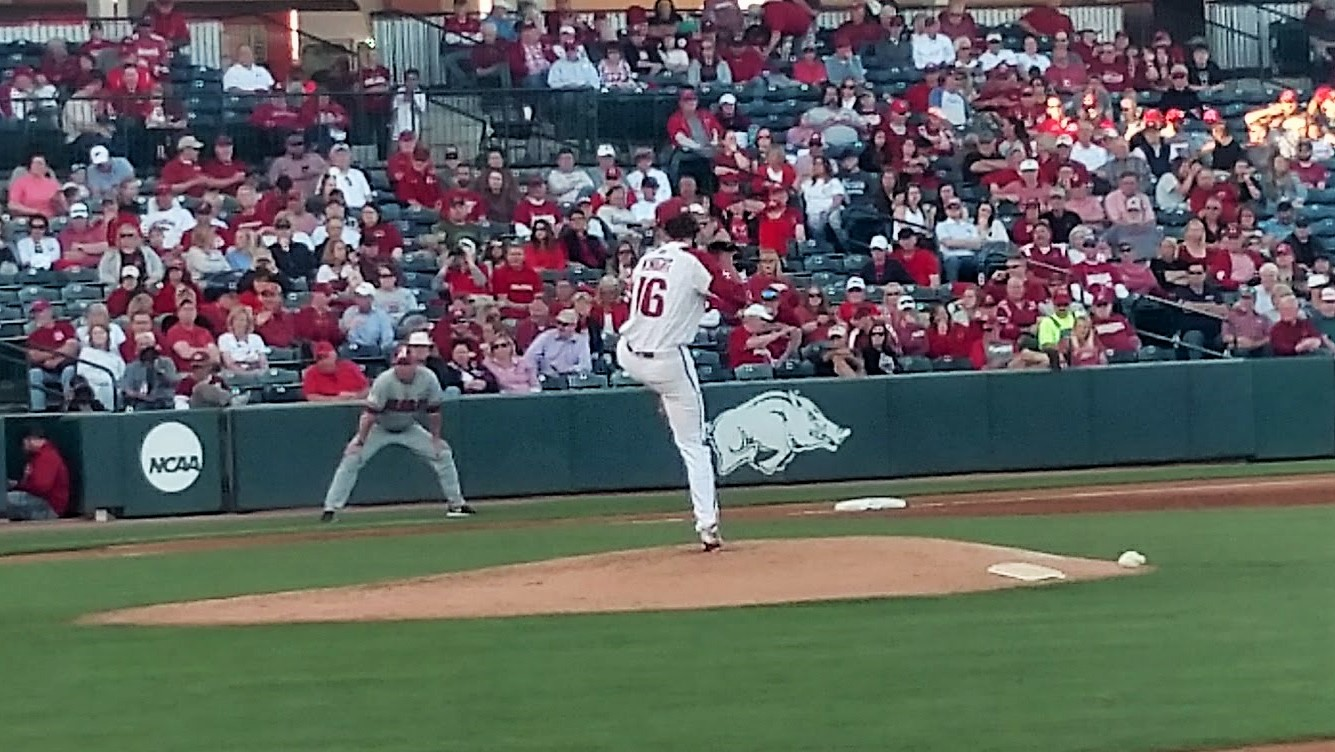
- Knight with the Razorbacks in 2018

Free agent
- Pitcher
- Born: June 28, 1996 (age 30); Bryant, Arkansas, U.S.
- Bats: Right Throws: Right
- Stats at Baseball Reference

Blaine Anthony Knight (born June 28, 1996) is an American professional baseball pitcher who is a free agent. He was drafted by the Baltimore Orioles in the third round of the 2018 Major League Baseball draft.

== Amateur career ==
Knight attended and graduated from Bryant High School in Bryant, Arkansas. In 2014, as a junior, he was 11–0 with a 0.49 ERA, helping lead Bryant to a state title. As a senior in 2015 he compiled a 6–2 record and 1.34 ERA while striking out 77 batters and walking only four in 57 2/3 innings pitched. He was not drafted out of high school in the 2015 Major League Baseball draft and enrolled at the University of Arkansas to play college baseball for the Arkansas Razorbacks.

As a freshman at Arkansas in 2016, Knight made 18 appearances on the mound (seven starts), compiled a 2.98 ERA and struck out 46 batters in 48 1/3 innings pitched for the Razorbacks. In 2017, as a sophomore, he was the Razorbacks number one starter, and in April was named to the midseason watch list for Golden Spikes Award, an award given annually to the best amateur baseball player in the United States, after compiling a 5–1 record and 1.94 ERA in eight starts. Knight finished the season with an 8–4 record and 3.28 ERA in 90 2/3 innings. After the season, he was drafted by the Texas Rangers in the 29th round of the 2017 Major League Baseball draft but did not sign and returned to Arkansas. In 2018, as a junior, Knight was named to the All-SEC Second Team, and to the College World Series All-Tournament Team. He finished his 2018 season with a 14-0 record and a 2.80 ERA over 19 starts.

== Professional career ==
=== Baltimore Orioles ===
Knight was selected by the Baltimore Orioles in the third round (87th overall) in the 2018 Major League Baseball draft, and he signed for $1.1 million. He made his professional debut with the Aberdeen IronBirds of the Low–A New York-Penn League and spent the remainder of 2018 there, posting a 0-1 record with a 2.61 ERA in four starts. Knight began 2019 with the Delmarva Shorebirds of the Single–A South Atlantic League and was their Opening Day starter. He was promoted to the Frederick Keys of the High–A Carolina League after posting a 3-0 record with a 0.68 ERA and 33 strikeouts in five starts (26 2/3 innings pitched) with Delmarva. Over 18 games (17 starts) with Frederick, Knight went 1-12 with a 6.13 ERA, striking out 56 and walking 39 over 83 2/3 innings.

Knight did not play in a game in 2020 due to the cancellation of the minor league season because of the COVID-19 pandemic. To begin the 2021 season, he was assigned to Aberdeen, new members of the High-A East. He was promoted to the Bowie Baysox of the Double-A Northeast in early June, and earned another promotion to the Norfolk Tides of the Triple-A East in mid-August. Over 22 games (13 starts) between the three clubs, Knight went 3-6 with a 5.40 ERA and 71 strikeouts over 86 2/3 innings. He returned to Norfolk for the 2022 season. Over 34 games (seven starts), he went 4-4 with a 7.38 ERA and seventy strikeouts over 72 innings. Knight was released by the Orioles organization on March 26, 2023.

=== Philadelphia Phillies ===
On May 21, 2024, after a year of inactivity, Knight signed a minor league contract with the Philadelphia Phillies. In 8 games split between the Single–A Clearwater Threshers and Triple–A Lehigh Valley IronPigs, he struggled to an 8.44 ERA with 12 strikeouts across 10 2/3 innings pitched. Knight was released by the Phillies organization on August 25.

== Personal life ==
Knight and his wife, Rachel (a former catcher for the Arkansas Razorbacks softball team), married in 2019. Their first child, a son, was born in 2021, and their second child, who is also a son, was born in 2026
