= List of Northeastern Huskies men's basketball head coaches =

The following is a list of Northeastern Huskies men's basketball head coaches. There have been 17 head coaches of the Huskies in their 103-season history.

Northeastern's current head coach is Bill Coen. He was hired as the Huskies' head coach in April 2006, replacing Ron Everhart, who left to become the head coach at Duquesne.

No.	Tenure	Coach	Years	Record	Pct.
1	1920–1921	Charles Foster	1	1–13	.071
2	1921–1923	Madison Jeffery	2	8–25	.242
3	1923–1929	Rufus Bond	6	39–59	.398
4	1929–1937	Alfred McCoy	8	63–57	.525
5	1937–1942	James W. Dunn	5	25–59	.298
6	1942–1945	Foxy Flumere	3	22–28	.440
7	1945–1946	Eugene Pare	1	4–13	.235
8	1946–1948	William Grinnell	2	16–18	.471
9	1948–1958	Joe Zabilski	10	82–110	.427
10	1958–1971	Dick Dukeshire	13	204–100	.671
11	1971–1972	Jim Bowman	1	12–9	.571
12	1972–1986	Jim Calhoun	14	250–137	.646
13	1986–1994	Karl Fogel	8	131–102	.562
14	1994–1996	Dave Leitao	2	22–35	.386
15	1996–2001	Rudy Keeling	5	48–92	.343
16	2001–2006	Ron Everhart	5	82–68	.547
17	2006–present	Bill Coen	17	270–264	.506
Totals		17 coaches	103 seasons	1,279–1,188	.518
Records updated through end of 2022–23 season Source
