= 2018 Atlantic Coast Conference baseball tournament =

American college baseball tournament

- Teams: 12
- Format: See below
- Finals site: Durham Bulls Athletic Park; Durham, NC
- Champions: Florida State (8th title)
- MVP: Cal Raleigh (Florida State)
- Television: ACCRSN (pool play)/ ESPN2 (championship)

2018 Atlantic Coast Conference baseball standings
	Conf.				Overall
Team	W		L	PCT	W		L	PCT
Atlantic
No. 17 Clemson ^{x}‍‍‍^{y}	22	–	8	.733	47	–	16	.746
No. 22 NC State ‍‍‍^{y}	19	–	11	.633	42	–	18	.700
No. 23 Louisville ‍‍‍^{y}	18	–	12	.600	45	–	19	.703
Florida State ‍‍‡‍^{y}	16	–	13	.552	43	–	19	.694
Wake Forest ‍‍‍	13	–	17	.433	25	–	32	.439
Notre Dame ‍‍‍	12	–	18	.400	24	–	30	.444
Boston College ‍‍‍	7	–	22	.241	17	–	32	.347
Coastal
No. 3 North Carolina ^{x}‍‍‍^{y}	22	–	8	.733	44	–	18	.710
No. 11 Duke ‍‍‍^{y}	18	–	11	.621	45	–	18	.714
Miami (FL) ‍‍‍	16	–	13	.552	28	–	26	.519
Georgia Tech ‍‍‍	14	–	16	.467	31	–	27	.534
Virginia ‍‍‍	12	–	17	.414	29	–	25	.537
Pittsburgh ‍‍‍	11	–	19	.367	29	–	26	.527
Virginia Tech ‍‍‍	8	–	22	.267	21	–	33	.389
x – Division champion ‡ – Tournament champion y – Invited to the NCAA tournament As of June 17, 2018; Rankings from Collegiate Baseball

The 2018 Atlantic Coast Conference baseball tournament was held from May 22 through 27 at Durham Bulls Athletic Park in Durham, North Carolina. The annual tournament determines the conference champion of the Division I Atlantic Coast Conference for college baseball. The tournament champion receives the league's automatic bid to the 2018 NCAA Division I baseball tournament. This was the last of 19 athletic championship events held by the conference in the 2017–18 academic year.

The tournament has been held every year but one since 1973, with Clemson winning ten championships, the most all-time. Georgia Tech has won nine championships, and Florida State has won seven titles since their entry to the league in 1992. Charter league member Duke, along with recent entrants Virginia Tech, Boston College, Pittsburgh and Notre Dame have never won the event. Louisville plays their third season in the ACC in 2017, and has also yet to win a title.

Florida State defeated Louisville in the championship game to win the tournament for the eighth time overall, and the third time in four seasons.

== Format and seeding ==
The winner of each seven team division and the top ten other teams based on conference winning percentage, regardless of division, from the conference's regular season will be seeded one through twelve. Seeds one and two are awarded to the two division winners. Teams are then divided into four pools of three teams each, with the winners advancing to single elimination bracket for the championship.

== Schedule and results ==
=== Schedule ===
Game	Time*	Matchup^{#}	Location	Television	Attendance
Tuesday, May 22
1	11:00 a.m.	#12 Pittsburgh vs. #8 Georgia Tech	Durham Bulls Athletic Park	ACCRSN	2,275
2	3:00 p.m.	#10 Virginia vs. #6 Florida State	Durham Bulls Athletic Park	ACCRSN	2,275
3	7:00 p.m.	#11 Notre Dame vs. #7 Miami	Durham Bulls Athletic Park	ACCRSN	2,690
Wednesday, May 23
4	11:00 a.m.	#9 Wake Forest vs. #5 Louisville	Durham Bulls Athletic Park	ACCRSN	
5	3:00 p.m.	#2 Clemson vs. #11 Notre Dame	Durham Bulls Athletic Park	ACCRSN	2,427
6	7:00 p.m.	#1 North Carolina vs. #12 Pittsburgh	Durham Bulls Athletic Park	ACCRSN	2,948
Thursday, May 24
7	11:00 a.m.	#4 Duke vs. #9 Wake Forest	Durham Bulls Athletic Park	ACCRSN	
8	3:00 p.m.	#3 NC State vs. #10 Virginia	Durham Bulls Athletic Park	ACCRSN	4,115
9	7:00 p.m.	#7 Miami vs. #2 Clemson	Durham Bulls Athletic Park	ACCRSN	3,154
Friday, May 25
10	11:00 a.m.	#5 Louisville vs. #4 Duke	Durham Bulls Athletic Park	ACCRSN	
11	3:00 p.m.	#8 Georgia Tech vs. #1 North Carolina	Durham Bulls Athletic Park	ACCRSN	3,499
12	7:00 p.m.	#6 Florida State vs. #3 NC State	Durham Bulls Athletic Park	ACCRSN	7,228
Saturday, May 26
Semifinal 1	1:00 p.m.	#12 Pittsburgh vs #5 Louisville	Durham Bulls Athletic Park	ACCRSN	4,233
Semifinal 2	5:00 p.m.	#2 Clemson vs #6 Florida State	Durham Bulls Athletic Park	ACCRSN	5,478
Championship – Sunday, May 27
Championship	12:00 p.m.	#5 Louisville vs #6 Florida State	Durham Bulls Athletic Park	ESPN2	5,436
*Game times in EDT. # – Rankings denote tournament seed.

== Pool Play ==
=== Pool A ===
Pos	Team	Pld	W	L	RF	RA	RD	PCT	Qualification
1	Pittsburgh	2	2	0	7	5	+2	1.000	Advance to Playoff round
2	North Carolina	2	1	1	13	5	+8	.500	
3	Georgia Tech	2	0	2	1	11	−10	.000	

Source: 247Sports

=== Pool B ===
Pos	Team	Pld	W	L	RF	RA	RD	PCT	Qualification
1	Clemson	2	2	0	28	5	+23	1.000	Advance to Playoff round
2	Miami	2	1	1	7	9	−2	.500	
3	Notre Dame	2	0	2	6	27	−21	.000	

Source: 247Sports

=== Pool C ===
Pos	Team	Pld	W	L	RF	RA	RD	PCT	Qualification
1	Florida State	2	2	0	8	4	+4	1.000	Advance to Playoff round
2	Virginia	2	1	1	6	5	+1	.500	
3	NC State	2	0	2	4	9	−5	.000	

Source: 247Sports

=== Pool D ===
Pos	Team	Pld	W	L	RF	RA	RD	PCT	Qualification
1	Louisville	2	2	0	19	4	+15	1.000	Advance to Playoff round
2	Duke	2	1	1	8	11	−3	.500	
3	Wake Forest	2	0	2	4	16	−12	.000	

Source: 247Sports

== Final ==
Semifinals
12	Pittsburgh	2
5	Louisville	5
2	Clemson	4
6	Florida State	5

Finals
5	Louisville	8
6	Florida State	11^{10}

=== Championship Game ===
Sunday, May 27 12:00 p.m.
Team	1	2	3	4	5	6	7	8	9	10	R	H	E
#6 Florida State	2	0	3	0	0	1	2	0	0	3	11	11	0
#5 Louisville	0	1	2	4	1	0	0	0	0	0	8	11	3
WP: Jonah Scolaro (2–1) LP: Michael McAvene (0–1); Home runs: FSU: None; UL: Devin Mann (6), Josh Stowers (9), Zach Britton (2); Attendance: 5,436; Notes: Game Duration - 4:09; Boxscore
