= James Bowman =

James or Jim Bowman may refer to:

- James Bowman (Canadian politician) (1861–1940), politician and farmer
- James Bowman (musician) (born 1980), American musician, lead guitarist of Against Me!
- James Bowman (countertenor) (1941–2023), British countertenor singer
- James Bowman (painter) (1793–1842), American portraitist
- James Bowman (surgeon) (1784–1846), Australian surgeon and politician
- James Bowman Lindsay (1799–1862), Scottish inventor and author
- James Cloyd Bowman (1880–1961), American teacher and author
- James E. Bowman (1923–2011), American physician and academic
- James F. Bowman (1849–1899), American journalist and Bohemian Club founder
- James Langstaff Bowman (1879–1951), Canadian politician
- Sir Jim Bowman, 1st Baronet (1898–1978), British trade unionist
- Jim Bowman (American football) (born 1963), American football defensive back
- Jim Bowman (basketball), American basketball player and coach
- JD Vance (born James Donald Bowman, 1984), American author, businessman and politician
