= 2018 NC State Wolfpack baseball team =

American college baseball season

2018 NC State Wolfpack baseball

NCAA Raleigh Regional, 2–2
- Conference: Atlantic Coast Conference

Ranking
- Coaches: No. 22
- CB: No. 22
- Record: 42–18 (19–11 ACC)
- Head coach: Elliott Avent (22nd season)
- Assistant coaches: Chris Hart (13th season); Austin Morgan (1st season)
- Pitching coach: Scott Foxhall (4th season)
- Home stadium: Doak Field

2018 Atlantic Coast Conference baseball standings
	Conf.				Overall
Team	W		L	PCT	W		L	PCT
Atlantic
No. 17 Clemson ^{x}‍‍‍^{y}	22	–	8	.733	47	–	16	.746
No. 22 NC State ‍‍‍^{y}	19	–	11	.633	42	–	18	.700
No. 23 Louisville ‍‍‍^{y}	18	–	12	.600	45	–	19	.703
Florida State ‍‍‡‍^{y}	16	–	13	.552	43	–	19	.694
Wake Forest ‍‍‍	13	–	17	.433	25	–	32	.439
Notre Dame ‍‍‍	12	–	18	.400	24	–	30	.444
Boston College ‍‍‍	7	–	22	.241	17	–	32	.347
Coastal
No. 3 North Carolina ^{x}‍‍‍^{y}	22	–	8	.733	44	–	18	.710
No. 11 Duke ‍‍‍^{y}	18	–	11	.621	45	–	18	.714
Miami (FL) ‍‍‍	16	–	13	.552	28	–	26	.519
Georgia Tech ‍‍‍	14	–	16	.467	31	–	27	.534
Virginia ‍‍‍	12	–	17	.414	29	–	25	.537
Pittsburgh ‍‍‍	11	–	19	.367	29	–	26	.527
Virginia Tech ‍‍‍	8	–	22	.267	21	–	33	.389
x – Division champion ‡ – Tournament champion y – Invited to the NCAA tournament As of June 17, 2018; Rankings from Collegiate Baseball

The 2018 NC State Wolfpack baseball team represented North Carolina State University during the 2018 NCAA Division I baseball season. The Wolfpack played their home games at Doak Field as a member of the Atlantic Coast Conference. They were led by head coach Elliott Avent, his 22nd season at NC State. The Wolfpack finished the season 2nd in the ACC's Atlantic Division with a record of 42–18, 19–11 in conference play. They qualified for the 2018 Atlantic Coast Conference baseball tournament, and were eliminated in pool play. They were invited to host the Raleigh Regional in the 2018 NCAA Division I baseball tournament. They lost in the regional final to Auburn.

== Previous season ==
In 2017, the Wolfpack finished the season 4th in the ACC's Atlantic Division with a record of 36–25, 16–14 in conference play. They qualified for the 2017 Atlantic Coast Conference baseball tournament, and were eliminated in pool play. They were invited to the 2017 NCAA Division I baseball tournament, where they participated in the Lexington Regional, where they lost in the regional final to host Kentucky.

== Personnel ==
=== Roster ===
2018 NC State Wolfpack roster
Pitchers: 10 – David Harrison – Freshman; 19 – Dalton Feeney – Sophomore; 20 – Austin Staley – (redshirt) Junior; 26 – Michael Bienlien – Sophomore; 27 – James Vaughan – (redshirt) Freshman; 28 – James Ferguson – (redshirt) Freshman; 29 – Reid Johnston – Freshman; 30 – Mathieu Gauthier – Sophomore; 33 – Johnny Piedmonte – Graduate; 34 – Evan Justice – Freshman; 35 – Cameron Cotter – Freshman; 38 – Brian Brown – Senior; 39 – Nolan Clenney – (redshirt) Junior; 41 – Joe O'Donnell – (redshirt) Senior; 43 – Connor Centala – (redshirt) Freshman; 44 – Kent Klyman – Sophomore; 45 – Josh Pike – Freshman; 46 – Nick Swiney – Freshman; 47 – Cole Hooper – Freshman; 51 – Josh Jimenez – Junior	Catchers: 5 – Patrick Bailey – Freshman; 12 – Brad Debo – Sophomore; 23 – Jack Conley – Junior; 24 – Brady Gulakowski – (redshirt) Freshman; Infielders: 2 – David Vazquez – Freshman; 3 – Devonte Brown – Freshman; 7 – Stephen Pitarra – Senior; 8 – Will Wilson – Junior; 16 – Shane Shepard – Senior; 17 – Dillon Cooper – (redshirt) Sophomore; 18 – Evan Edwards – Junior; 32 – Steven Oakley – (redshirt) Sophomore; 42 – J.T. Jarrett – Freshman	Outfielders: 1 – Terrell Tatum - Freshman; 6 – Brett Kinneman – Junior; 11 – Lawson McArthur – Sophomore; 13 – Brock Deatherage – Senior; 15 – Josh McLain – Senior; 31 – Hunter Baker – Freshman

=== Coaching staff ===
Name	Position	Seasons at NC State	Alma mater
Elliott Avent	Head coach	22	North Carolina State University
Chris Hart	Associate Head Coach	13	Florida State University (2003)
Scott Foxhall	Pitching Coach	4	College of Charleston (1994)
Austin Morgan	Assistant coach	1	College of Charleston (2010)

== Schedule ==
	NC State win	
	NC State loss	
	Postponement	
**Bold**	NC State team member	
*	Non-Conference game	
†	Make-Up Game	Legend

2018 NC State Wolfpack baseball game log
Regular season
February

Date	Opponent	Rank	Site/stadium	Score	Win	Loss	Save	Attendance	Overall record	ACC Record
February 16	Seton Hall*	23	Doak Field • Raleigh, NC	**W** 8–4	**Brown** (1–0)	McCarthy (0–1)	**Johnston** (1)	2,588	1–0	–
February 16	Seton Hall*	23	Doak Field • Raleigh, NC	**W** 3–1	**Piedmonte** (1–0)	Politi (0–1)	**O'Donnell** (1)	2,719	2–0	–
February 18	Seton Hall*	23	Doak Field • Raleigh, NC	**L** 6–7	Espinal (1–0)	**Harrison** (0–1)	Leon (1)	2,719	2–1	–
February 20	North Carolina A&T*	24	Doak Field • Raleigh, NC	**W** 9–7	**Justice** (1–0)	Bottenfield (0–1)	**O'Donnell** (2)	2,179	3–1	–
February 21	UNC–Charlotte*	24	Doak Field • Raleigh, NC	**W** 9–6	**Klyman** (1–0)	Perry (0–1)	**O'Donnell** (3)	2,340	4–1	–
February 23	Furman*	24	Doak Field • Raleigh, NC	**W** 10–0	**Brown** (2–0)	Schuermann (1–1)	None	2,548	5–1	–
February 24	Furman*	24	Doak Field • Raleigh, NC	**W** 9–2	**Piedmonte** (2–0)	Crawford (0–1)	**Johnston** (2)	2,978	6–1	–
February 25	Furman*	24	Doak Field • Raleigh, NC	**W** 9–0	**Clenney** (1–0)	Lazzaro (0–1)	None	2,291	7–1	–
February 26	Air Force*	16	Doak Field • Raleigh, NC	**W** 15–5	**Bienlien** (1–0)	Biancalana (0–1)	None	2,073	8–1	–

March

Date	Opponent	Rank	Site/stadium	Score	Win	Loss	Save	Attendance	Overall record	ACC Record
March 2	Bowling Green*	16	Doak Field • Raleigh, NC	**W** 11–1	**Brown** (3–0)	Carey (1–1)	None	2,176	9–1	–
March 3	Campbell*	16	Doak Field • Raleigh, NC	**W** 21–4	**Swiney** (1–0)	Horrell (1–1)	**Gauthier** (1)	2,440	10–1	–
March 4	Canisius*	16	Doak Field • Raleigh, NC	**L** 2–3	Ginther (1–0)	**O'Donnell** (0–1)	Smith (4)	2,335	10–2	–
March 6	UNC–Wilmington*	17	Doak Field • Raleigh, NC						–	–
March 7	at Campbell*	17	Jim Perry Stadium • Buies Creek, NC	**W** 4–1	**Justice** (2–0)	Winans (1–2)	**Johnston** (3)	734	11–2	–
March 9	Boston College	17	Doak Field • Raleigh, NC	**W** 2–1	**Johnston** (1–0)	Stevens (1–2)	**Klyman** (1)	2,227	12–2	1–0
March 10	Boston College	17	Doak Field • Raleigh, NC	**W** 13–7	**Swiney** (2–0)	Metzdorf (0–2)	**Klyman** (2)	2,266	13–2	2–0
March 10	Boston College	17	Doak Field • Raleigh, NC	**L** 3–11	Rapp (2–1)	**Harrison** (0–2)	None	2,471	13–3	2–1
March 13	UNC–Asheville*	19	Doak Field • Raleigh, NC	**W** 15–11	**Clenney** (2–0)	Juday (0–1)	None	2,102	14–3	2–1
March 14	UNC–Asheville*	19	Doak Field • Raleigh, NC	**W** 6–2	**Johnston** (2–0)	Brown (0–1)	None	2,077	15–3	2–1
March 16	at No. 2 Clemson	19	Doug Kingsmore Stadium • Clemson, SC	**W** 4–0	**Bienlien** (2–0)	Hennessy (1–1)	**Klyman** (3)	4,679	16–3	3–1
March 17	at No. 2 Clemson	19	Doug Kingsmore Stadium • Clemson, SC	**W** 6–1	**Brown** (4–0)	Crawford (1–1)	**Johnston** (4)	5,008	17–3	4–1
March 18	at No. 2 Clemson	19	Doug Kingsmore Stadium • Clemson, SC	**W** 5–4	**O'Donnell** (1–1)	Miller (2–1)	None	4,540	18–3	5–1
March 23	Georgia Tech	8	Doak Field • Raleigh, NC	**L** 4–13	Curry (5–0)	**Bienlien** (2–1)	None	2,391	18–4	5–2
March 23	Georgia Tech	8	Doak Field • Raleigh, NC	**W** 5–2	**Piedmonte** (3–0)	Thomas (2–3)	**O'Donnell** (4)	2,698	19–4	6–2
March 25	Georgia Tech	8	Doak Field • Raleigh, NC	**W** 9–6	**Klyman** (2–0)	Datoc (0–3)	None	2,346	20–4	7–2
March 27	George Mason*	6	Doak Field • Raleigh, NC	**W** 3–2	**Swiney** (3–0)	DiCesare (2–4)	**O'Donnell** (5)	2,201	21–4	7–2
March 29	at Virginia Tech	6	English Field • Blacksburg, VA	**L** 2–10	Coward (2–2)	**Bienlien** (2–2)	None	572	21–5	7–3
March 30	at Virginia Tech	6	English Field • Blacksburg, VA	**W** 10–2	**Piedmonte** (4–0)	Scherzer (1–2)	None	697	22–5	8–3
March 31	at Virginia Tech	6	English Field • Blacksburg, VA	**W** 1–0	**Johnston** (3–0)	McDonald (1–5)	**O'Donnell** (6)	807	23–5	9–3

April

Date	Opponent	Rank	Site/stadium	Score	Win	Loss	Save	Attendance	Overall record	ACC Record
April 6	at No. 11 Louisville	4	Jim Patterson Stadium • Louisville, KY	**L** 2–8	Wolf (4–2)	**Piedmonte** (4–1)	None	3,125	23–6	9–4
April 7	at No. 11 Louisville	4	Jim Patterson Stadium • Louisville, KY	**W** 9–6	**Klyman** (3–0)	Bordner (1–2)	None	2,117	24–6	10–4
April 8	at No. 11 Louisville	4	Jim Patterson Stadium • Louisville, KY	**W** 10–3	**Clenney** (3–0)	Miller (3–1)	None	2,192	25–6	11–4
April 11	at UNC–Wilmington*	2	Brooks Field • Wilmington, NC	**W** 8–3	**Johnston** (4–0)	Easter (3–2)	None	2,155	26–6	11–4
April 13	Notre Dame	2	Doak Field • Raleigh, NC	**L** 8–12	Holubecki (2–1)	**Klyman** (3–1)	Kmet (7)	3,048	26–7	11–5
April 14	Notre Dame	2	Doak Field • Raleigh, NC	**W** 12–2	**Brown** (5–0)	Sheehan (1–4)	None	3,048	27–7	12–5
April 14	Notre Dame	2	Doak Field • Raleigh, NC	**W** 13–5	**Bienlien** (3–2)	Junker (0–4)	**O'Donnell** (7)	3,048	28–7	13–5
April 17	vs No. 8 North Carolina*	2	Durham Bulls Athletic Park • Durham, NC	**W** 8–3	**Johnston** (5–0)	Hutchison (3–2)	None	6,799	29–7	13–5
April 20	at No. 3 Duke	2	Jack Coombs Field • Durham, NC	**W** 9–2	**Johnston** (6–0)	Laskey (6–3)	None	1,844	30–7	14–5
April 21	at No. 3 Duke	2	Jack Coombs Field • Durham, NC	**W** 2–1	**Brown** (6–0)	Stallings (3–3)	**O'Donnell** (7)	2,000	31–7	15–5
April 22	at No. 3 Duke	2	Jack Coombs Field • Durham, NC	**L** 2–11	Day (2–2)	**Bienlien** (3–3)	None	2,000	31–8	15–6
April 24	No. 15 East Carolina*	3	Doak Field • Raleigh, NC						–	–
April 27	No. 6 North Carolina	3	Doak Field • Raleigh, NC	**L** 5–6	Casparius (1–0)	**Klyman** (3–2)	Lancellotti (1)	3,048	31–9	15–7
April 28	No. 6 North Carolina	3	Doak Field • Raleigh, NC	**L** 6–8	Bergner (5–1)	**Brown** (6–1)	Daniels (2)	3,048	31–10	15–8
April 29	No. 6 North Carolina	3	Doak Field • Raleigh, NC	**L** 4–5	O'Brien (4–0)	**Piedmonte** (4–2)	Casparius (1)	3,048	31–11	15–9

May

Date	Opponent	Rank	Site/stadium	Score	Win	Loss	Save	Attendance	Overall record	ACC Record
May 2	Campbell*	7	Doak Field • Raleigh, NC	**L** 4–5	Thomas (3–0)	**O'Donnell** (1–2)	Messer (7)	2,802	31–12	15–9
May 4	William & Mary*	7	Doak Field • Raleigh, NC	**W** 5–0	**Johnston** (7–0)	Sheehan (2–7)	None	2,855	32–12	15–9
May 5	William & Mary*	7	Doak Field • Raleigh, NC	**W** 8–4	**Klyman** (4–2)	Haney (1–7)	None	2,924	33–12	15–9
May 6	William & Mary*	7	Doak Field • Raleigh, NC	**W** 7–3	**Swiney** (3–0)	Farrell (2–4)	None	1,238	34–12	15–9
May 8	James Madison*	7	Doak Field • Raleigh, NC	**W** 7–3	**Klyman** (5–2)	Jones (0–1)	**O'Donnell** (9)	2,623	35–12	15–9
May 9	James Madison*	7	Doak Field • Raleigh, NC	**W** 15–2	**Harrison** (1–2)	Richards (0–2)	None	2,300	36–12	15–9
May 11	Wake Forest	7	Doak Field • Raleigh, NC	**W** 8–5	**Klyman** (6–2)	Menendez (0–4)	None	3,039	37–12	16–9
May 12	Wake Forest	7	Doak Field • Raleigh, NC	**W** 7–5	**Piedmonte** (5–2)	Shuster (0–3)	**O'Donnell** (10)	3,048	38–12	17–9
May 13	Wake Forest	7	Doak Field • Raleigh, NC	**W** 10–6	**Centala** (1–0)	Witt (2–4)	**Klyman** (4)	2,767	39–12	18–9
May 17	at No. 22 Florida State	7	Dick Howser Stadium • Tallahassee, FL	**L** 3–4 (11)	Van Eyk (5–0)	**O'Donnell** (1–3)	None	3,682	39–13	18–10
May 18	at No. 22 Florida State	7	Dick Howser Stadium • Tallahassee, FL	**L** 3–6 (10)	Van Eyk (6–0)	**Piedmonte** (5–3)	None	4,119	39–14	18–11
May 19	at No. 22 Florida State	7	Dick Howser Stadium • Tallahassee, FL	**W** 5–3	**Klyman** (7–2)	Sands (7–3)	**O'Donnell** (11)	4,416	40–14	19–11

Post-season
ACC Tournament

Date	Opponent	Rank	Site/stadium	Score	Win	Loss	Save	Attendance	Overall record	ACCT Record
May 24	vs (10) Virginia	8 (3)	Durham Bulls Athletic Park • Durham, NC	**L** 2–4	Casey (7–4)	**Harrison** (1–3)	Sousa (6)	4,115	40–15	0–1
May 25	vs No. 16 (6) Florida State	8 (3)	Durham Bulls Athletic Park • Durham, NC	**L** 2–5	Parrish (5–0)	**Brown** (6–2)	None	7,228	40–16	0–2

NCAA tournament Raleigh Regional

Date	Opponent	Rank	Site/stadium	Score	Win	Loss	Save	Attendance	Overall record	NCAAT Record
June 1	(4) Army	9 (1)	Doak Field • Raleigh, NC	**L** 1–5	Giovinco (9–5)	**Johnston** (7–1)	None	3,048	40–17	0–1
June 2	(3) Northeastern	9 (1)	Doak Field • Raleigh, NC	**W** 9–3	**Brown** (7–2)	Stiehl (3–2)	None	2,543	41–17	1–1
June 3	(4) Army	9 (1)	Doak Field • Raleigh, NC	**W** 11–1	**Klyman** (8–2)	Ball (7–3)	None	2,665	42–17	2–1
June 3	(2) Auburn	9 (1)	Doak Field • Raleigh, NC	**L** 7–15	Greenhill (5–2)	**Harrison** (1–4)	None	2,771	42–18	2–2

All rankings from Collegiate Baseball.

== Ranking movements ==
Ranking movements Legend: ██ Increase in ranking ██ Decrease in ranking — = Not ranked
	Week																			
Poll	Pre	1	2	3	4	5	6	7	8	9	10	11	12	13	14	15	16	17	18	Final
Coaches'	25	25*	25	22	20	10	9	7	6	4	3	10	5	4	9	14				
Baseball America	—	—	—	—	23	10	10	6	2	2	2	7	7	7	10	15				
Collegiate Baseball^	23	24	16	17	19	8	6	4	2	2	3	7	7	7	8	9	22	22		
NCBWA†	28	29	26	23	23	13	10	7	6	5	4	10	5	4	9	11	21			

^ Collegiate Baseball ranked 40 teams in their preseason poll, but only ranked 30 teams weekly during the season.
† NCBWA ranks 30 teams in their preseason poll, but only ranks 25 teams weekly during the season.
* A new poll was not released for this week, so for comparison purposes, the previous week's ranking is inserted in this week's slot.
