= 2018 Louisville Cardinals baseball team =

American college baseball season

2018 Louisville Cardinals baseball
- Conference: Atlantic Coast Conference

Ranking
- Coaches: No. 25
- CB: No. 23
- Record: 45–19 (18–12 ACC)
- Head coach: Dan McDonnell (12th season)
- Assistant coaches: Roger Williams (12th season); Eric Snider (4th season); Adam Vrable (4th season)
- Home stadium: Jim Patterson Stadium

2018 Atlantic Coast Conference baseball standings
	Conf.				Overall
Team	W		L	PCT	W		L	PCT
Atlantic
No. 17 Clemson ^{x}‍‍‍^{y}	22	–	8	.733	47	–	16	.746
No. 22 NC State ‍‍‍^{y}	19	–	11	.633	42	–	18	.700
No. 23 Louisville ‍‍‍^{y}	18	–	12	.600	45	–	19	.703
Florida State ‍‍‡‍^{y}	16	–	13	.552	43	–	19	.694
Wake Forest ‍‍‍	13	–	17	.433	25	–	32	.439
Notre Dame ‍‍‍	12	–	18	.400	24	–	30	.444
Boston College ‍‍‍	7	–	22	.241	17	–	32	.347
Coastal
No. 3 North Carolina ^{x}‍‍‍^{y}	22	–	8	.733	44	–	18	.710
No. 11 Duke ‍‍‍^{y}	18	–	11	.621	45	–	18	.714
Miami (FL) ‍‍‍	16	–	13	.552	28	–	26	.519
Georgia Tech ‍‍‍	14	–	16	.467	31	–	27	.534
Virginia ‍‍‍	12	–	17	.414	29	–	25	.537
Pittsburgh ‍‍‍	11	–	19	.367	29	–	26	.527
Virginia Tech ‍‍‍	8	–	22	.267	21	–	33	.389
x – Division champion ‡ – Tournament champion y – Invited to the NCAA tournament As of June 17, 2018; Rankings from Collegiate Baseball

The 2018 Louisville Cardinals baseball team represented the University of Louisville during the 2018 NCAA Division I baseball season. The Cardinals played their home games at Jim Patterson Stadium as a member of the Atlantic Coast Conference. They were led by head coach Dan McDonnell, in his twelfth year at Louisville.

== Previous season ==
In 2017, the Cardinals finished as champions of the Atlantic Coast Conference with a 52–9 record, compiling a 23–6 mark in the ACC. In 2018, Louisville finished the regular season 45–19 overall and received an at-large bid to the NCAA Tournament, where the team advanced to the championship round of the NCAA Lubbock Regional before losing 11–6 to No. 9 Texas Tech. It marked the program's seventh consecutive season advancing to a regional final under head coach Dan McDonnell.
