= John Connelly (baseball) =

American baseball coach

Biographical details
- Born: 1927 or 1928
- Died: August 17, 2013 (aged 85); Needham, Massachusetts, U.S.
- Education: Newton High School (1946); Northeastern University (BA, 1953) (M.Ed, 1966)

Playing career

Baseball
- c. 1950–1953: Northeastern

Ice hockey
- c. 1950–1953: Northeastern

Football
- c. 1950–1953: Northeastern
- Position: Quarterback

Coaching career (HC unless noted)

Baseball
- 1956–1981: Northeastern

Head coaching record
- Overall: 288–280–6 (.507)
- College Baseball Hall of Fame; Inducted in 1984

John J. Connelly (c. 1927/1928 – August 17, 2013) was the head coach for Northeastern University's Northeastern Huskies baseball team from 1956 to 1981. He was nicknamed "Tinker".

== Early life ==
Connelly graduated Newton High School in 1946 and then served in the United States Army during its Occupation of Japan. He attended Northeastern University, where he played football as a quarterback, hockey as a defenseman and baseball as a second baseman. He led the football team to an undefeated season in 1951 and was captain of the 1952 baseball team. He graduated in 1953.

== Coaching career ==
His career record with the team was 288-280-6. He was named the New England Coach of the Year in 1964. He led the Huskies to the College World Series in 1966.

He was elected to the Northeastern University Athletics Hall of Fame in 1975 and the College Baseball Hall of Fame in 1984.
