= 2018 North Carolina Tar Heels baseball team =

American college baseball season

2018 North Carolina Tar Heels baseball

ACC Regular season Champion Chapel Hill Regional Champion Chapel Hill Super Regional Champion

College World Series
- Conference: Atlantic Coast Conference
- Record: 44–18 (22–8 ACC)
- Head coach: Mike Fox (20th season)
- Home stadium: Bryson Field at Boshamer Stadium

2018 Atlantic Coast Conference baseball standings
	Conf.				Overall
Team	W		L	PCT	W		L	PCT
Atlantic
No. 17 Clemson ^{x}‍‍‍^{y}	22	–	8	.733	47	–	16	.746
No. 22 NC State ‍‍‍^{y}	19	–	11	.633	42	–	18	.700
No. 23 Louisville ‍‍‍^{y}	18	–	12	.600	45	–	19	.703
Florida State ‍‍‡‍^{y}	16	–	13	.552	43	–	19	.694
Wake Forest ‍‍‍	13	–	17	.433	25	–	32	.439
Notre Dame ‍‍‍	12	–	18	.400	24	–	30	.444
Boston College ‍‍‍	7	–	22	.241	17	–	32	.347
Coastal
No. 3 North Carolina ^{x}‍‍‍^{y}	22	–	8	.733	44	–	18	.710
No. 11 Duke ‍‍‍^{y}	18	–	11	.621	45	–	18	.714
Miami (FL) ‍‍‍	16	–	13	.552	28	–	26	.519
Georgia Tech ‍‍‍	14	–	16	.467	31	–	27	.534
Virginia ‍‍‍	12	–	17	.414	29	–	25	.537
Pittsburgh ‍‍‍	11	–	19	.367	29	–	26	.527
Virginia Tech ‍‍‍	8	–	22	.267	21	–	33	.389
x – Division champion ‡ – Tournament champion y – Invited to the NCAA tournament As of June 17, 2018; Rankings from Collegiate Baseball

The 2018 North Carolina Tar Heels baseball team are representing the University of North Carolina at Chapel Hill in the 2018 NCAA Division I baseball season. Head Coach Mike Fox is in his 20th year coaching the Tar Heels. They play their home games at Bryson Field at Boshamer Stadium and are members of the Atlantic Coast Conference.

The Tar Heels won the ACC Coastal Division, and matched Clemson for the best record in the conference. They reached the 2018 College World Series, their eleventh time advancing to Omaha and first since 2013.

== Roster ==
North Carolina Tar Heels 2018 baseball roster
Players		Coaches
Pitchers: 19 - Brett Daniels - Senior; 23 - Tyler Baum - Sophomore; 24 - Hansen Butler - (redshirt) Junior; 25 - Taylor Sugg - Junior; 27 - Jason Morgan - (redshirt) Junior; 31 - Josh Hiatt - (redshirt) Sophomore; 34 - Caden O'Brien - Freshman; 36 - Joey Lancellotti - Freshman; 37 - Bo Weiss - Sophomore; 39 - Kyle Blendinger - Freshman; 41 - Cooper Criswell - Junior; 42 - Gianluca Dalatri - Sophomore; 44 - Austin Love - Freshman; 45 - Austin Bergner - Sophomore; 48 - Rodney Hutchison Jr. - Junior; Catchers: 4 - Brandon Martorano - Sophomore; 11 - Cody Roberts - Junior; 43 - Brendan Illies - Junior	Infielders: 2 - Satchel Jerzembeck - Freshman; 3 - Kyle Datres - Junior; 7 - Dallas Tessar - (redshirt) Sophomore; 8 - Ike Freeman - Sophomore; 10 - Zack Gahagan - Senior; 15 - Michael Busch - Sophomore; 18 - Clemente Inclan - Freshman; Outfielders: 1 - Brandon Riley - Junior; 5 - Ashton McGee - Sophomore; 6 - Dylan Enwiller - Junior; 12 - Josh Ladowski - Junior; 16 - Earl Semper - Freshman; 26 - Jackson Hesterlee - Junior; 38 - Kip Brandenburg - Sophomore; 40 - Angel Zarate - Freshman; 46 - Ben Casparius - Freshman	Coaches: #30 - Mike Fox (Head Coach); #21 - Scott Forbes (Associate Head Coach); Robert Woodard (Assistant Coach/ Pitching Coach); Jesse Wierzbicki

== Schedule ==
Legend
	North Carolina win
	North Carolina loss
**Bold**	North Carolina team member
*	Non-Conference game

2018 North Carolina Tar Heels baseball game log
Regular season

February
Date	Opponent	Rank	Site/stadium	Score	Win	Loss	Save	Attendance	Overall record	ACC record
Feb 16	at South Florida*	No. 7	USF Baseball Stadium • Tampa, FL	**L** 3–4	McClanahan (1–0)	**Dalatri (0–1)**	Perez (1)	1,653	0–1	
Feb 17	at South Florida*	No. 7	USF Baseball Stadium • Tampa, FL	**W** 12–5	**Baum (1–0)**	Strzelecki (0–1)	None	1,289	1–1	
Feb 18	at South Florida*	No. 7	USF Baseball Stadium • Tampa, FL	**W** 9–8	**Bergner (1–0)**	Perez (0–1)	None	1,009	2–1	
Feb 20	UNC Wilmington*	No. 7	Boshamer Stadium • Chapel Hill, NC	**L** 4–5	Warren (1–0)	**Lancellotti (0–1)**	Cota (2)	1,127	2–2	
Feb 21	St. John's*	No. 7	Boshamer Stadium • Chapel Hill, NC	**L** 2–5	French (0–1)	**Criswell (0–1)**	LaSorsa (2)	1,891	2–3	
Feb 23	at East Carolina*	No. 7	Clark–LeClair Stadium • Greenville, NC	**L** 1–2	Benton (2–0)	**Dalatri (0–2)**	Smith (1)	5,382	2–4	
Feb 24	vs East Carolina*	No. 7	Durham Bulls Athletic Park • Durham, NC	**W** 5–4	**Bergner (2–0)**	Ross (0–1)	**Hiatt (1)**	4,508	3–4	
Feb 25	East Carolina*	No. 7	Boshamer Stadium • Chapel Hill, NC	**L** 0–12	Holba (2–0)	**Hutchison (0–1)**	None	2,925	3–5	
Feb 27	High Point*		Boshamer Stadium • Chapel Hill, NC	**W** 10–0	**O'Brien (1–0)**	Kates (0–1)	None	1,647	4–5	

March
Date	Opponent	Rank	Site/stadium	Score	Win	Loss	Save	Attendance	Overall record	ACC record
Mar 2	Liberty*		Boshamer Stadium • Chapel Hill, NC	**W** 17–2	**Baum (2–0)**	Skirrow (1–1)	None	1,967	5–5	
Mar 3	Liberty*		Boshamer Stadium • Chapel Hill, NC	**W** 6–5	**Daniels (1–0)**	Price (0–1)	**Hiatt (2)**	2,152	6–5	
Mar 4	Liberty*		Boshamer Stadium • Chapel Hill, NC	**W** 13–8	**Sugg (1–0)**	Stamper (1–1)	None	1,999	7–5	
Mar 9	at No. 8 Louisville		Jim Patterson Stadium • Louisville, KY	**L** 4–5	Conway (1–0)	**Criswell (1–2)**	Bordner (5)	2,109	7–6	0–1
Mar 10	at No. 8 Louisville		Jim Patterson Stadium • Louisville, KY	**L** 4–6	Smiddy (2–0)	**Bergner (2–1)**	Bordner (6)	2,199	7–7	0–2
Mar 11	at No. 8 Louisville		Jim Patterson Stadium • Louisville, KY	**W** 10–3	**Daniels (2–0**	Thompson (1–1)	None	2,142	8–7	1–2
Mar 13	North Carolina A&T*		Boshamer Stadium • Chapel Hill, NC	**W** 1–0	**Hutchison (1–1)**	Chavis (0–2)	None	1,460	9–7	
Mar 4	Gardner–Webb*		Boshamer Stadium • Chapel Hill, NC	**L** 0–1	Fox (2–1)	**Lancellotti (0–2)**	Thompson (3)	1,486	9–8	
Mar 16	Pittsburgh		Boshamer Stadium • Chapel Hill, NC	**W** 15–3	**Baum (3–0)**	West (1–2)	None	1,888	10–8	2–2
Mar 17	Pittsburgh		Boshamer Stadium • Chapel Hill, NC	**W** 4–0	**Bergner (3–1)**	Pidich (2–1)	None	2,063	11–8	3–2
Mar 18	Pittsburgh		Boshamer Stadium • Chapel Hill, NC	**W** 13–2	**Sugg (2–0)**	Calvo (0–1)	None	1,907	12–8	4–2
Mar 20	Maryland*		Boshamer Stadium • Chapel Hill, NC	**W** 13–1	**Hutchison (2–1)**	DiLuia (1–2)	None	1,445	13–8	
Mar 23	No. 12 Florida State		Boshamer Stadium • Chapel Hill, NC	**W** 16–8	**Daniels (3–0)**	Kwiatkowski (3–1)	None		14–8	5–2
Mar 23	No. 12 Florida State		Boshamer Stadium • Chapel Hill, NC	**L** 3–6	Scolaro (1–0)	**Butler (0–1)**	None	2,973	14–9	5–3
Mar 25	No. 12 Florida State		Boshamer Stadium • Chapel Hill, NC	**L** 4–9	Van Eyk (1–0)	**Hiatt (0–1)**	None	2,394	14–10	5–4
Mar 27	at Charlotte*		BB&T Ballpark • Charlotte, NC	**W** 14–2	**Hutchison (3–1)**	Gooding (2–1)	None	4,049	15–10	
Mar 30	Wake Forest		Boshamer Stadium • Chapel Hill, NC	**W** 3–2	**Criswell (1–2)**	Witt (0–2)	None	2,806	16–10	6–4
Mar 31	Wake Forest		Boshamer Stadium • Chapel Hill, NC	**W** 6–1	**Bergner (4–1)**	McSweeney (1–3)	None	3,050	17–10	7–4

April
Date	Opponent	Rank	Site/stadium	Score	Win	Loss	Save	Attendance	Overall record	ACC record
Apr 1	Wake Forest		Boshamer Stadium • Chapel Hill, NC	**W** 8–6	**Daniels (4–0)**	Hearn (1–2)	None	2,389	18–10	8–4
Apr 3	vs South Carolina*	No. 30	BB&T Ballpark • Charlotte, NC	**W** 11–3	**Lancellotti (1–2)**	Mlodzinksi (0–3)	None	7,410	19–10	
Apr 6	at Miami (FL)	No. 30	Alex Rodriguez Park at Mark Light Field • Coral Gables, FL	**W** 8–4	**Hiatt (1–1)**	Mediavilla (0–3)	None	2,599	20–10	9–4
Apr 7	at Miami (FL)	No. 30	Alex Rodriguez Park at Mark Light Field • Coral Gables, FL	**W** 9–6	**Criswell (2–2)**	McKendry (4–4)	None	3,175	21–10	10–4
Apr 8	at Miami (FL)	No. 30	Alex Rodriguez Park at Mark Light Field • Coral Gables, FL	**L** 5–7	Cabezas (3–3)	**Lacellotti (1–3)**	None	2,346	21–11	10–5
Apr 10	Appalachian State*	No. 12	Boshamer Stadium • Chapel Hill, NC	**W** 4–1	**Daniels (5–0)**	Boone (2–3)	**Hiatt (3)**	1,703	22–11	
Apr 13	at Virginia	No. 12	Davenport Field • Charlottesville, VA	**L** 0–4	Casey (5–2)	**Baum (3–1)**	Abbott (4)	3,706	22–12	10–6
Apr 14	at Virginia	No. 12	Davenport Field • Charlottesville, VA	**W** 8–6	**Daniels (6–0)**	Sousa (3–4)	None	4,022	23–12	11–6
Apr 15	at Virginia	No. 12	Davenport Field • Charlottesville, VA	**W** 12–6	**Lancellotti (2–3)**	Donahue (1–2)	**Daniels (1)**	3,297	24–12	12–6
Apr 17	vs No. 2 NC State*	No. 8	Durham Bulls Athletic Park • Durham, NC	**L** 3–8	Johnston (5–0)	**Hutchison (3–2)**	None	6,799	24–13	
Apr 20	Georgia Tech	No. 8	Boshamer Stadium • Chapel Hill, NC	**W** 9–3	**O'Brien (2–0)**	Curry (6–2)	None	2,795	25–13	13–6
Apr 21	Georgia Tech	No. 8	Boshamer Stadium • Chapel Hill, NC	**W** 9–8	**Hiatt (2–1)**	Hughes (0–3)	None	3,871	26–13	14–6
Apr 22	Georgia Tech	No. 8	Boshamer Stadium • Chapel Hill, NC	**W** 10–3	**Criswell (3–2)**	English (2–1)	None	2,794	27–13	15–6
Apr 25	Western Carolina*	No. 6	Boshamer Stadium • Chapel Hill, NC	**W** 8–2	**O'Brien (3–0)**	Bishop (0–4)	None	2,701	28–13	
Apr 27	at No. 3 NC State	No. 6	Doak Field • Raleigh, NC	**W** 6–5	**Casparius (1–0)**	Klyman (3–2)	**Lancellotti (1)**	3,048	29–13	16–6
Apr 28	at No. 3 NC State	No. 6	Doak Field • Raleigh, NC	**W** 8–6	**Bergner (5–1)**	Brown (6–1)	**Daniels (2)**	3,048	30–13	17–6
Apr 29	at No. 3 NC State	No. 6	Doak Field • Raleigh, NC	**W** 5–4	**O'Brien (4–0)**	Piedmonte (4–2)	**Casparius (1)**	3,048	31–13	18–6

May
Date	Opponent	Rank	Site/stadium	Score	Win	Loss	Save	Attendance	Overall record	ACC record
May 1	UNC Asheville*	No. 4	Boshamer Stadium • Chapel Hill, NC	**W** 11–5	**Lancellotti (3–3)**	Harris (1–0)	None	1,971	32–13	
May 8	Richmond*	No. 3	Boshamer Stadium • Chapel Hill, NC	**W** 6–2	**O'Brien (5–0)**	Delarso (0–1)	None	2,386	33–13	
May 9	at No. 28 Coastal Carolina*	No. 3	Springs Brooks Stadium • Conway, SC	**L** 2–5	Veneziano (5–0)	**Sugg (2–1)**	Causey (2)	2,616	33–14	
May 11	at No. 10 Duke	No. 3	Durham Bulls Athletic Park • Durham, NC	**L** 3–7	DeCaster (5–0)	**Lancellotti (3–4)**	Labosky (9)	4,368	33–15	18–7
May 12	at No. 10 Duke	No. 3	Durham Bulls Athletic Park • Durham, NC	**L** 2–5	Day (5–2)	**Bergner (5–2)**	None	3,126	33–16	18–8
May 13	at No. 10 Duke	No. 3	Durham Bulls Athletic Park • Durham, NC	**W** 8–6	**Baum (4–1)**	Laskey (6–4)	**Hiatt (4)**	2,572	34–16	19–8
May 15	at UNC Wilmington*	No. 6	Brooks Field • Wilmington, NC	**L** 2–4	Gesell (3–1)	**Hutchison (3–3)**	Beehler (2)	1,781	34–17	
May 17	Virginia Tech	No. 6	Boshamer Stadium • Chapel Hill, NC	**W** 9–1	**Criswell (4–2)**	Scherzer (1–4)	None	1,828	35–17	20–8
May 18	Virginia Tech	No. 6	Boshamer Stadium • Chapel Hill, NC	**W** 11–2	**Bergner (6–2)**	Seymour (3–3)	None	2,264	36–17	21–8
May 19	Virginia Tech	No. 6	Boshamer Stadium • Chapel Hill, NC	**W** 6–1	**Hiatt (3–1)**	Coward (2–7)	None	2,823	37–17	22–8

Postseason

ACC Tournament
Date	Opponent	Rank	Site/stadium	Score	Win	Loss	Save	Attendance	Overall record	ACCT Record
May 23	(12) Pittsburgh	No. 5 (1)	Durham Bulls Athletic Park • Durham, NC	**L** 4–5	West (3–4)	**Hiatt (3–2)**	None	2,948	37–18	0–1
May 25	(8) Georgia Tech	No. 5 (1)	Durham Bulls Athletic Park • Durham, NC	**W** 9–0	**Dalatri (1–2)**	Thomas (7–4)	None	38–18	1–1	

NCAA Chapel Hill Regional
Date	Opponent	Rank	Site/stadium	Score	Win	Loss	Save	Attendance	Overall record	Regional Record
June 1	(4) North Carolina A&T	No. 5 (1)	Boshamer Stadium • Chapel Hill, NC	**W** 11–0	**Criswell (5–2)**	Luth (6–3)	None	2,735	39–18	1–0
June 2	No. 24 (3) Houston	No. 5 (1)	Boshamer Stadium • Chapel Hill, NC	**W** 4–3	**Dalatri (2–2)**	Cumbie (7–4)	**Hiatt (5)**	3,186	40–18	2–0
June 3	No. 24 (3) Houston	No. 5 (1)	Boshamer Stadium • Chapel Hill, NC	**W** 19–11	**Bergner (7–2)**	Lockhart (1–2)	None	2,866	41–18	3–0

NCAA Chapel Hill Super Regional
Date	Opponent	Rank	Site/stadium	Score	Win	Loss	Save	Attendance	Overall record	SR Record
June 8	No. 8 (11) Stetson	No. 3 (6)	Boshamer Stadium • Chapel Hill, NC	**W** 7–4	**Criswell (6–2)**	Gilbert (11–2)	**Bergner (1)**	3,631	42–18	1–0
June 9	No. 8 (11) Stetson	No. 3 (6)	Boshamer Stadium • Chapel Hill, NC	**W** 7–5	**O'Brien (6–0)**	Perkins (11–3)	**Hiatt (6)**	3,937	43–18	2–0

NCAA College World Series
Date	Opponent	Rank	Site/stadium	Score	Win	Loss	Save	Attendance	Overall record	CWS record
June 16	(3) Oregon State	(6)	TD Ameritrade Park • Omaha, NE	**W** 8-6	**O'Brien (7-0)**	Heimlich (16-2)	**Criswell (1)**	21,628	44-18	1-0
June 18	Mississippi State	(6)	TD Ameritrade Park • Omaha, NE							

Rankings are from the Collegiate Baseball poll for that week. Numbers in parentheses indicate tournament seeds.

== Ranking movements ==
Ranking movements Legend: ██ Increase in ranking ██ Decrease in ranking — = Not ranked
	Week																		
Poll	Pre	1	2	3	4	5	6	7	8	9	10	11	12	13	14	15	16	17	Final
Coaches'	7	7*	7*	21	—	—	—	—	22	17	12	6	4	8	6	8			
Baseball America	6	6	13	13	—	—	—	—	20	19	10	5	3	6	5	6			
Collegiate Baseball^	7	7	—	—	—	—	—	30	12	8	6	4	3	6	5	5			
NCBWA†	7	8	19	21	26	27	29	27	23	18	11	5	4	8	6	7			

^ Collegiate Baseball ranked 40 teams in their preseason poll, but only ranked 30 teams weekly during the season.
† NCBWA ranks 30 teams in their preseason poll, but only ranks 25 teams weekly during the season.
* A new poll was not released for this week, so for comparison purposes, the previous week's ranking is inserted in this week's slot.
