= 2018 Miami Hurricanes baseball team =

American college baseball season

2018 Miami Hurricanes baseball
- Conference: Atlantic Coast Conference
- Record: 28-26 (16-13 ACC)
- Head coach: Jim Morris (25th season)
- Assistant coaches: Gino DiMare (19th season); J.D. Arteaga (16th season); Norberto Lopez (3rd season)
- Home stadium: Alex Rodriguez Park at Mark Light Field

2018 Atlantic Coast Conference baseball standings
	Conf.				Overall
Team	W		L	PCT	W		L	PCT
Atlantic
No. 17 Clemson ^{x}‍‍‍^{y}	22	–	8	.733	47	–	16	.746
No. 22 NC State ‍‍‍^{y}	19	–	11	.633	42	–	18	.700
No. 23 Louisville ‍‍‍^{y}	18	–	12	.600	45	–	19	.703
Florida State ‍‍‡‍^{y}	16	–	13	.552	43	–	19	.694
Wake Forest ‍‍‍	13	–	17	.433	25	–	32	.439
Notre Dame ‍‍‍	12	–	18	.400	24	–	30	.444
Boston College ‍‍‍	7	–	22	.241	17	–	32	.347
Coastal
No. 3 North Carolina ^{x}‍‍‍^{y}	22	–	8	.733	44	–	18	.710
No. 11 Duke ‍‍‍^{y}	18	–	11	.621	45	–	18	.714
Miami (FL) ‍‍‍	16	–	13	.552	28	–	26	.519
Georgia Tech ‍‍‍	14	–	16	.467	31	–	27	.534
Virginia ‍‍‍	12	–	17	.414	29	–	25	.537
Pittsburgh ‍‍‍	11	–	19	.367	29	–	26	.527
Virginia Tech ‍‍‍	8	–	22	.267	21	–	33	.389
x – Division champion ‡ – Tournament champion y – Invited to the NCAA tournament As of June 17, 2018; Rankings from Collegiate Baseball

The 2018 Miami Hurricanes baseball team represented the University of Miami during the 2018 NCAA Division I baseball season. The Hurricanes played their home games at Alex Rodriguez Park at Mark Light Field as a member of the Atlantic Coast Conference. They were led by head coach Jim Morris, in his 25th and final season at Miami. For the second straight season, the Hurricanes failed to reach the NCAA Division I baseball tournament, having done so 44 consecutive times previous to that.

== Roster ==
2018 Miami Hurricanes roster
Pitchers: 19 - Jeb Bargfeldt - Senior; 52 - Frankie Bartow - Junior; 35 - Andrew Cabezas Junior; 36 - Jeremy Cook - Freshman; 27 - Daniel Epstein - (redshirt) Junior; 99 - Daniel Federman - Freshman; 39 - Cooper Hammond - (redshirt) Senior; 22 - Albert Maury Jr. - Sophomore; 18 - Michael Mediavilla - Senior; 14 - Evan McKendry - Sophomore; 7 - Chris McMahon - Freshman; 34 - Daniel Rivero - Sophomore; 32 - Alex Ruiz - Freshman; 0 - Gregory Veliz - Sophomore	Catchers: 24 - Michael Amditis - Sophomore; 31 - Isaac Quinones - Freshman; 45 - Joe Sparber - Freshman; Infielders: 38 - Connor Allen - Freshman; 9 - Willy Escala - Freshman; 28 - Raymond Gil - Freshman; 10 - Romy Gonzalez - Junior; 13 - Tyler Paige - Freshman; 47 - Michael Perez - Senior; 30 - Alex Toral - Freshman; 16 - Freddy Zamora - Freshman	Outfielders: 4 - Michael Burns - Senior; 44 - Dylan Cloonan - Freshman; 37 - Kam Lane - Junior; 51 - Tony Jenkins - Freshman; 2 - Danny Reyes - Junior; 43 - Gabe Rivera - Freshman; 21 - Hunter Tackett - Senior

== Coaching staff ==
Name	Position	Seasons at Miami	Alma mater
Jim Morris	Head coach	25	Elon University (1973)
Gino DiMare	Assistant coach	19	University of Miami (1992)
J.D. Arteaga	Assistant coach	16	University of Miami (2002)
Norberto Lopez	Assistant coach	3	Nova Southeastern University (1999)

== Schedule ==
Legend
	Miami win
	Miami loss
	Postponement
**Bold**	Miami team member

2018 Miami Hurricanes baseball game log
Regular Season

February
Date	Opponent	Rank	Site/stadium	Score	Win	Loss	Save	Attendance	Overall record	ACC record
February 16	Rutgers		Alex Rodriguez Park at Mark Light Field • Coral Gables, FL	7–1	Bargfeldt	O'Reilly		3001	1–0	
February 17	Rutgers		Alex Rodriguez Park • Coral Gables, FL	8–5	Hammond	Brito	Cabezas	2750	2–0	
February 18	Rutgers		Alex Rodriguez Park • Coral Gables, FL	5–7	Heatter	McKendry	Blum	2257	2–1	
February 21	Missouri		Alex Rodriguez Park • Coral Gables, FL	0–9	Sharp	Mediavilla		2202	2–2	
February 23	Florida		Alex Rodriguez Park • Coral Gables, FL	3–7	Singer	Bargfeldt	Mace	3596	2–3	
February 24	Florida		Alex Rodriguez Park • Coral Gables, FL	2–8	Kowar	Veliz	Leftwich	4156	2–4	
February 25	Florida		Alex Rodriguez Park • Coral Gables, FL	2–0	McKendry	Dyson	Cabezas	3388	3–4	
February 28	at Florida Atlantic		FAU Baseball Stadium • Boca Raton, FL	4–5	Peden	Mediavilla	Schneider	1844	3–5	

March
Date	Opponent	Rank	Site/stadium	Score	Win	Loss	Save	Attendance	Overall record	ACC record
March 2	Maine		Alex Rodriguez Park • Coral Gables, FL	1–6	Geoffrion	Cabezas		2290	3–6	
March 3	Maine		Alex Rodriguez Park • Coral Gables, FL	7–6	Epstein	Laweryson		2593	4–6	
March 4	Maine		Alex Rodriguez Park • Coral Gables, FL	7–1	McKendry	Murphy		2368	5–6	
March 7	at FIU		FIU Baseball Stadium • Miami, FL	3–5	Casey	Federman		1715	5–7	
March 9	Notre Dame		Alex Rodriguez Park • Coral Gables, FL	3–0	Bargfeldt	Tully	Hammond	2650	6–7	1-0
March 10	Notre Dame		Alex Rodriguez Park • Coral Gables, FL	9–0	McKendry	Sheehan	Bartow		7–7	2-0
March 10	Notre Dame		Alex Rodriguez Park • Coral Gables, FL	5–9	Vierling	Cabezas		2573	7–8	2-1
March 14	at UCF		John Euliano Park • Orlando, FL	4–3	Federman	Sheridan	Hammond	2188	8–8	
March 16	at Duke		Durham Bulls Athletic Park • Durham, NC	3–4	Laskey	Bargfeldt	Labosky	531	8–9	2-2
March 17	at Duke		Durham Bulls Athletic Park • Durham, NC	1–4	Stallings	McKendry	Labosky	1006	8–10	2-3
March 18	at Duke		Durham Bulls Athletic Park • Durham, NC	8–2	Cabezas	Day		1126	9–10	3-3
March 21	Florida Atlantic		Alex Rodriguez Park • Coral Gables, FL	9–11	Clemente	Hammond	Schneider	2831	9–11	
March 23	Virginia		Alex Rodriguez Park • Coral Gables, FL	3–2	Bartow	Abbott		2347	10–11	4-3
March 24	Virginia		Alex Rodriguez Park • Coral Gables, FL	1–0	McKendry	Lynch	Bartow	2962	11–11	5-3
March 25	Virginia		Alex Rodriguez Park • Coral Gables, FL	8–1	Cabezas	Nicholson	Hammond	2273	12–11	6-3
March 28	Florida Gulf Coast		Swanson Stadium • Fort Myers, FL	0–1	Lumbert	Federman	Kenton	1982	12–12	
March 30	at Georgia Tech		Russ Chandler Stadium • Atlanta, GA	1–6	Curry	Bargfeldt		1191	12–13	6-4
March 31	at Georgia Tech		Russ Chandler Stadium • Atlanta, GA	4–13	Thomas	McKendry		1648	12–14	6-5

April
Date	Opponent	Rank	Site/stadium	Score	Win	Loss	Save	Attendance	Overall record	ACC record
April 1	at Georgia Tech		Russ Chandler Stadium • Atlanta, GA	1–4	English	Cabezas	Archer	1137	12–15	6-6
April 4	FAU		Alex Rodriguez Park • Coral Gables, FL	4–7	Nowatnick	Federman	Schneider	2253	12–16	
April 6	North Carolina		Alex Rodriguez Park • Coral Gables, FL	4–8	Hiatt	Mediavilla		2599	12–17	6-7
April 7	North Carolina		Alex Rodriguez Park • Coral Gables, FL	6–9	Criswell	McKendry		3175	12–18	6-8
April 8	North Carolina		Alex Rodriguez Park • Coral Gables, FL	7–5	Cabezas	Lancellotti		2346	13–18	7-8
April 11	UCF		Alex Rodriguez Park • Coral Gables, FL	0–4	Finfrock	Hammond		2366	13–19	
April 13	at Clemson		Doug Kingsmore Stadium • Clemson, SC	12–11	Bartow	Spiers		5350	14–19	8-8
April 14	at Clemson		Doug Kingsmore Stadium • Clemson, SC	6–1	McKendry	Crawford			15–19	9–8
April 14	at Clemson		Doug Kingsmore Stadium • Clemson, SC	3–8	Higganbotham	Cabezas		6513	15–20	9-9
April 18	FGCU		Alex Rodriguez Park • Coral Gables, FL	8–1	McMahon	Gray		2197	16–20	
April 20	Pittsburgh		Alex Rodriguez Park • Coral Gables, FL	1–2	Smith	Federman	Chentouf	2478	16–21	9-10
April 21	Pittsburgh		Alex Rodriguez Park • Coral Gables, FL	0–3	Pidich	McKendry	Freure	2066	16–22	9-11
April 21	Pittsburgh		Alex Rodriguez Park • Coral Gables, FL	3–0	Cabezas	Calvo		3123	17–22	10-11
April 25	FIU		Alex Rodriguez Park • Coral Gables, FL	6–14	Machado	McMahon		2259	17–23	
April 27	at Florida State		Dick Howser Stadium • Tallahassee, FL	0–2	Parrish	Bargfeldt	Scolaro	4432	17–24	10-12
April 28	at Florida State		Dick Howser Stadium • Tallahassee, FL	1–10	Van Eyk	McKendry		5356	17–25	10-13
April 29	at Florida State		Dick Howser Stadium • Tallahassee, FL	11–5	Cabezas	Scolaro		5377	18–25	11-13

May
Date	Opponent	Rank	Site/stadium	Score	Win	Loss	Save	Attendance	Overall record	ACC record
May 4	Bethune Cookman		Alex Rodriguez Park • Coral Gables, FL	4–2	Bargfeldt	Norris	Bartow	2452	19–25	
May 5	Bethune-Cookman		Alex Rodriguez Park • Coral Gables, FL	8–7	Hammond	Coutinho		2236	20–25	
May 6	Bethune-Cookman		Alex Rodriguez Park • Coral Gables, FL	12–11	Bartow	Wilkes		2104	21–25	
May 9	FGCU		Alex Rodriguez Park • Coral Gables, FL	7–1	Cabezas	Lumbert		2130	22–25	
May 11	at Virginia Tech		English Field • Blacksburg, VA	5–4	Federman	McDonald	Hammond	561	23–25	12-13
May 12	at Virginia Tech		English Field • Blacksburg, VA	16–4	McKendry	Coward		582	24–25	13-13
May 13	at Virginia Tech		English Field • Blacksburg, VA	12–8	Bartow	McDonald		572	25–25	14-13
May 15	Stetson		Alex Rodriguez Park • Coral Gables, FL							
May 17	Boston College		Alex Rodriguez Park • Coral Gables, FL	3–0	Bargfeldt	Stevens		2132	26–25	15-13
May 18	Boston College		Alex Rodriguez Park • Coral Gables, FL	4–3	McKendry	Metzdorf	Bartow	2528	27–25	16-13
May 19	Boston College		Alex Rodriguez Park • Coral Gables, FL							

Postseason

ACC Tournament
Date	Opponent	Rank	Site/stadium	Score	Win	Loss	Save	Attendance	Overall record	ACCT Record
May 22	Notre Dame		Durham Bulls Athletic Park • Durham, NC	6–2	Bartow	Belcik		2690	28–25	1-0
May 24	Clemson		Durham Bulls Athletic Park • Durham, NC	1–7	Miller	Bargfeldt		3154	28–26	1-1

== Rankings ==
Ranking movements Legend: — = Not ranked
	Week																		
Poll	Pre	1	2	3	4	5	6	7	8	9	10	11	12	13	14	15	16	17	Final
Coaches'	24	24*																	
Baseball America	—																		
Collegiate Baseball^	20																		
NCBWA†	26																		

^ Collegiate Baseball ranked 40 teams in their preseason poll, but only ranked 30 teams weekly during the season.
† NCBWA ranks 30 teams in their preseason poll, but only ranks 25 teams weekly during the season.
* A new poll was not released for this week, so for comparison purposes, the previous week's ranking is inserted in this week's slot.
