= Dick Dukeshire =

American basketball coach

Biographical details
- Died: May 5, 2012 (aged 78); Hingham, Massachusetts, U.S.

Playing career
- 1953–1956: American International

Coaching career (HC unless noted)
- 1956–1958: Northeastern (Freshmen)
- 1958–1971: Northeastern
- 1971–1972: Greece
- 1974–1975: Panathinaikos B.C.
- 1975–1980: Greece
- 1980–1985: Hellenic College
- 1985–1987: Salve Regina
- 1987–1988: Panathinaikos B.C.
- 1991–1992: Wellesley HS (MA)
- 1993: AEK B.C.

Richard E. Dukeshire was an American basketball coach who was the head coach of the Northeastern Huskies men's basketball team, the Greece men's national basketball team, Panathinaikos B.C., and AEK B.C.

== Playing ==
A native of Easthampton, Massachusetts, Dukeshire played basketball, baseball, and football at Northampton High School and the Monson Academy. In 1952, he was the leading scorer on the Monson team that won the New England Prep school class A basketball championship. He then attended American International College, where he was a star basketball and baseball player, but was unable to play football due to a disability.

== Coaching ==
Dukeshire graduated from AIC in 1956 and soon thereafter was named freshman basketball and football coach at Northeastern University. In 1958, he succeeded Joe Zabilski as varsity basketball coach. In 13 seasons under Dukeshire, the Huskies had a 204–100 record and made six appearances in the NCAA College Division men's basketball tournament before becoming a University Division school in 1968.

In 1971, Dukeshire took a one year sabbatical from Northeastern to coach the Greece men's national basketball team. However, due to illness, he was unable to resume his duties after his sabbatical ended. Jim Bowman, who was interim coach during Dukeshire's sabbatical, had left coaching to take a job with the Federal Bureau of Investigation. As a result, Northeastern hired a local high school coach, Jim Calhoun, who went on to become a member of the Basketball Hall of Fame. After recovering, Dukeshire returned to Greece, where he coached the Greece men's national under-19 basketball team and the Greece men's national under-16 basketball team. During the 1974–75 season he was the head coach of Panathinaikos B.C. He led the team a 20–2 record and a victory over Olympiacos B.C. in the league final. From 1975 to 1980, he was once again coach of the men's national team.

Dukeshire returned to the United States as head basketball coach of the Hellenic College Holy Cross Greek Orthodox School of Theology. From 1985 to 1987, Dukeshire was the head basketball coach at Salve Regina College and compiled a 22–25 record. During the 1987–88 season, he returned Panathinaikos B.C., where he led the team to a 10–8 record.

In 1991, Dukeshire returned to the United States, citing anti-American sentiment and crime in Greece. He accepted the position of head boys' basketball coach at Wellesley High School in Wellesley, Massachusetts. He was head coach of AEK B.C. for part of the 1992–93 season.

Dukeshire died of heart failure on May 5, 2012 at a nursing home in Hingham, Massachusetts. He was 78 years old.
