= 2018 NCAA Division I baseball rankings =

2018 NCAA Division I baseball season
- Duration: February 16, 2018–June 2018
- Number of teams: 300
- Preseason No. 1: Florida (CB)

Tournament
- Duration: June 1, 2018 to June 28, 2018
- Most conference bids: SEC (10)

College World Series
- Champions: Oregon State (3rd title)
- Runners-up: Arkansas
- MOP: Adley Rutschman, Oregon State

Seasons
- ← 2017 2019 →

The following human polls make up the 2018 NCAA Division I men's baseball rankings. The USA Today/ESPN Coaches Poll is voted on by a panel of 31 Division I baseball coaches. The Baseball America poll is voted on by staff members of the Baseball America magazine. These polls, along with the Perfect Game USA poll, rank the top 25 teams nationally. Collegiate Baseball and the National Collegiate Baseball Writers Association rank the top 30 teams nationally.

== Legend ==
	Increase in ranking
	Decrease in ranking
	Not ranked previous week
Italics	Number of first place votes
(#-#)	Win–loss record
т	Tied with team above or below also with this symbol

== ESPN/USA Today Coaches Poll ==
	Preseason Jan 29	Week 3 Mar 5	Week 4 Mar 12	Week 5 Mar 19	Week 6 Mar 26	Week 7 Apr 2	Week 8 Apr 9	Week 9 Apr 16	Week 10 Apr 23	Week 11 Apr 30	Week 12 May 7	Week 13 May 14	Week 14 May 21	Week 15 May 28	Final June 28	
1.	Florida 26	Florida (12–1)	Oregon State (15–1)	Oregon State (18–1)	Oregon State (20–2)	Florida (25–5)	Florida (28–6)	Florida (32–6)	Florida (34–8)	Florida (36–10)	Florida (38–11)	Florida (41–12)	Stanford (43–8)	Florida (42–17)	Oregon State (55–12–1)	1.
2.	Oregon State 4	Oregon State (12–0)	Florida (15–3)	Florida (18–4)	Florida (21–5)	Stanford (20–3)	Stanford (23–5)	Stanford (27–5)	Stanford (30–5)	Stanford (33–6)	Stanford (37–6)	Oregon State (38–8–1)	Oregon State (42–9–1)	Oregon State (44–10–1)	Arkansas (48–21)	2.
3.	Texas Tech 1	Texas Tech (13–0)	Stanford (14–2)	Stanford (14–2)	Stanford (17–2)	Ole Miss (25–4)	Arkansas (24–9)	Arkansas (27–10)	NC State (31–8)	Oregon State (32–7)	Oregon State (35–7–1)	Stanford (39–8)	Florida (41–15)	Stanford (44–10)	Florida (49–21)	3.
4.	TCU	Florida State (11–0)	Kentucky (14–3)	Arkansas (16–4)	Ole Miss (22–3)	Oregon State (21–4)	Ole Miss (27–6)	NC State (28–7)	Texas Tech (32–9)	Arkansas (32–13)	North Carolina (32–13)	North Carolina State (39–12)	Ole Miss (42–14)	Ole Miss (46–15)	North Carolina (44–20)	4.
5.	Florida State	Stanford (11–1)	Texas Tech (15–2)	Ole Miss (19–2)	Florida State (20–5)	Texas Tech (23–6)	Texas Tech (26–7)	Texas Tech (29–8)	Oregon State (29–6)	Mississippi (34–11)	NC State (34–12)	Ole Miss (39–13)	Clemson (42–13)	Florida State (43–17)	Texas Tech (45–20)	5.
6.	Arkansas	Kentucky (11–1)	Texas A&M (16–1)	Auburn (19–2)	Arkansas (17–7)	Florida State (22–7)	NC State (25–6)	Oregon State (26–6)	Ole Miss (32–9)	North Carolina (31–13)	Clemson (35–12)	Arkansas (36–15)	North Carolina (37–17)	Arkansas (39–18)	Mississippi State (39–29)	6.
7.	North Carolina	Arkansas (9–3)	Florida State (14–2)	Vanderbilt (15–5)	Texas Tech (21–5)	NC State (23–5)	Oregon State (24–6)	Ole Miss (29–8)	Arkansas (28–13)	UCLA (29–10)	Arkansas (33–15)	Clemson (39–13)	Arkansas (37–17)	Clemson (45—14)	Texas (42–23)	7.
8.	Kentucky	Texas A&M (11–1)	Ole Miss (15–1)	Florida State (16–4)	Vanderbilt (17–7)	Arkansas (19–9)	Clemson (25–7)	Duke (30–7)	East Carolina (30–9)	Texas Tech (33–12)	Ole Miss (36–13)	North Carolina (34–16)	Georgia (37–17)	North Carolina (38–18)	Washington (35–26)	8.
9.	LSU	Ole Miss (10–1)	Clemson (15–1)	Texas Tech (17–5)	NC State (20–4)	Clemson (22–6)	East Carolina (24–7)	Kentucky (25–11)	UCLA (25–10)	Clemson (34–11)	Southern Miss (35–12)	Duke (38–12)	NC State (40–14)	Georgia (37–19)	Auburn (43–23)	9.
10.	Vanderbilt	Louisville (11–0)	Arkansas (11–4)	NC State (18–3)	Kentucky (17–7)	Kentucky (19–9)	Florida State (24–9)	Indiana (26–6)	Clemson (29–11)	NC State (31–11)	Texas Tech (35–14)	East Carolina (37–13)	Florida State (39–17)	Minnesota (41–13)	Duke (45–18)	10.
11.	Texas A&M	Clemson (10–1)	Louisville (14–1)	Kentucky (14–6)	Auburn (20–5)	Indiana (20–5)	Kentucky (22–10)	East Carolina (26–9)	Duke (31–10)	Southern Miss (32–11)	Duke (35–11)	Texas Tech (35–15)	Texas Tech (38–15)	Texas Tech (39–17)	Minnesota (44–15)	11.
12.	Cal State Fullerton	TCU (7–3)	TCU (9–4)	Texas A&M (17–4)	Clemson (18–6)	Duke (24–5)	Duke (27–6)	Vanderbilt (22–14)	North Carolina (27–13)	Duke (33–11)	East Carolina (33–12)	Florida State (37–16)	Minnesota (37–13)	East Carolina (43–16)	Tennessee Tech (53–12)	12.
13.	Louisville	UCLA (9–2)	Vanderbilt (12–4)	UCLA (13–4)	UCLA (15–5)	East Carolina (20–6)	Indiana (22–6)	UCLA (22–9)	Southern Miss (28–11)	Kentucky (29–15)	Florida State (32–15)	Georgia (35–16)	Texas (37–18)	Stetson (45–11)	Stetson (48–13)	13.
14.	UCLA	Vanderbilt (10–3)	Auburn (15–1)	Louisville (16–4)	Southern Miss (17–5)	Southern Miss (19–7)	UCLA (19–8)	Texas A&M (27–9)	Florida State (29–12)	East Carolina (30–12)	UCLA (30–13)	Southern Miss (36–14)	Duke (39–14)	NC State (40–16)	Stanford (46–12)	14.
15.	Mississippi State	Auburn (12–0)	UCLA (10–4)	Clemson (16–4)	Texas A&M (19–6)	Auburn (22–7)	Southern Miss (22–9)	Clemson (26–10)	Kentucky (26–14)	Florida State (31–14)	Georgia (33–14)	Minnesota (34–13)	East Carolina (39–15)	Coastal Carolina (42–17)	Ole Miss (48–17)	15.
16.	Stanford	Southern Miss (8–3)	Southern Miss (11–4)	Indiana (15–4)	Indiana (16–5)	Vanderbilt (17–11)	Vanderbilt (19–13)	Southern Miss (24–11)	Indiana (29–8)	Coastal Carolina (31–14)	Minnesota (32–12)	Texas (33–18)	Stetson (41–11)	Texas (37–20)	Vanderbilt (35–27)	16.
17.	Dallas Baptist	Indiana (9–2)	East Carolina (12–3)	Southern Miss (14–4)	East Carolina (18–5)	Georgia (21–7)	Oklahoma (23–11)	North Carolina (24–12)	Vanderbilt (24–16)	Indiana (31–10)	Auburn (34–14)	Stetson (40–11)	Southern Miss (39–15)	Southern Miss (43–16)	South Carolina (37–26)	17.
18.	Virginia	LSU (8–4)	Indiana (11–4)	East Carolina (16–4)	Louisville (18–6)	UCLA (16–7)	Georgia (23–9)	Florida State (24–12)	Texas A&M (29–11)	Texas A&M (32–12)	Texas (33–18)	UCLA (31–16)	UCLA (35–17)	Duke (40–15)	Clemson (47–16)	18.
19.	Ole Miss	Virginia (8–4)	LSU (11–6)	Duke (16–4)	Duke (20–5)	Texas A&M (21–8)	Texas A&M (23–9)	Georgia (25–11)	Coastal Carolina (28–14)	Oklahoma State (27–14–1)	Kentucky (30–17)	Kentucky (33–18)	Coastal Carolina (38–17)	Auburn (39–21)	Cal State Fullerton (36–25)	19.
20.	Texas	Texas (8–4)	NC State (13–3)	LSU (14–7)	TCU (14–7)	LSU (18–11)	Wichita State (22–7)	Oklahoma (26–13)	Georgia (27–13)	Georgia (30–14)	Texas A&M (34–14)	Coastal Carolina (36–16)	Tennessee Tech (46–7)	UCLA (36–19)	Georgia (39–21)	20.
21.	Clemson	North Carolina (7–5)	Virginia (10–6)	UCF (17–4)	LSU (16–9)	Louisville (19–8)	Coastal Carolina (23–11)	LSU (24–13)	Texas (28–15)	Vanderbilt (25–18)	Connecticut (27–14–1)	Tennessee Tech (44–6)	Auburn (37–19)	Connecticut (35–20–1)	Florida State (43–19)	21.
22.	Houston	NC State (10–2)	UCF (13–3)	TCU (10–7)	Coastal Carolina (19–7)	Missouri (21–7)	North Carolina (21–11)	Coastal Carolina (26–12)	Auburn (29–12)	Minnesota (28–12)	Oklahoma State (28–17–1)	Auburn (35–17)	Connecticut (32–18–1)	Louisville (43–17)	NC State (42–18)	22.
23.	South Alabama	East Carolina (8–3)	Duke (12–3)	UNLV (18–3)	Wichita State (17–4)	Oklahoma (20–10)	Auburn (23–10)	Texas (24–14)	Oklahoma (27–15)	Connecticut (25–13–1)	Coastal Carolina (32–16)	Connecticut (30–16–1)	Houston (33–21)	Tennessee Tech (48–9)	East Carolina (44–18)	23.
24.	Miami (FL)	Coastal Carolina (10–3)	UNLV (15–2)	Virginia (13–7)	Georgia (18–6)	Coastal Carolina (21–9)	LSU (20–13)	Wichita State (24–9)	Connecticut (22–12–1)	Texas (30–17)	Tennessee Tech (40–6)	Oklahoma State (29–19–1)	South Carolina (32–22)	Houston (36–23)	Southern Miss (44–18)	24.
25.	NC State	St. John's (8–1)	Mississippi State (10–6)	Sam Houston State (16–4)	UNLV (20–5)	Wichita State (19–6)	Missouri State (22–7)	Auburn (25–12)	Tennessee Tech (34–5)	Tennessee Tech (37–6)	Stetson (37–11)	Houston (31–20)	Louisville (40–16)	Texas A&M (39–20)	Louisville (45–19)	25.
	Preseason Jan 29	Week 3 Mar 5	Week 4 Mar 12	Week 5 Mar 19	Week 6 Mar 26	Week 7 Apr 2	Week 8 Apr 9	Week 9 Apr 16	Week 10 Apr 23	Week 11 Apr 30	Week 12 May 7	Week 13 May 14	Week 14 May 21	Week 15 May 28	Final June 28	
		Dropped: 12. Cal State Fullerton; 15. Mississippi State; 17. Dallas Baptist; 22. Houston; 23. South Alabama; 24. Miami (FL)	Dropped: 20. Texas; 21. North Carolina; 24. Coastal Carolina; 25. St. John's	Dropped: 25. Mississippi State	Dropped: 21. UCF; 24. Virginia; 25. Sam Houston State	Dropped: 20. TCU; 23. UNLV	Dropped: 21. Louisville; 22. Missouri	Dropped: 25. Missouri State	Dropped: 21. LSU; 24. Wichita State	Dropped: 22. Auburn; 23.Oklahoma	Dropped: 17. Indiana; 21. Vanderbilt	Dropped: 20. Texas A&M	Dropped: 19. Kentucky; 24. Oklahoma State	Dropped: 24. South Carolina	Dropped: No. 15 Coastal Carolina; No. 19 UCLA; No. 21 Connecticut; No. 24 Houston; No. 25 Texas A&M	

== Baseball America ==
	Preseason Jan 23	Week 1 Feb 19	Week 2 Feb 26	Week 3 Mar 5	Week 4 Mar 12	Week 5 Mar 19	Week 6 Mar 26	Week 7 Apr 2	Week 8 Apr 9	Week 9 Apr 16	Week 10 Apr 23	Week 11 Apr 30	Week 12 May 7	Week 13 May 14	Week 14 May 21	Week 15 May 28	Final June 29	
1.	Florida	Florida (3–0)	Florida (7–1)	Florida (12–1)	Oregon State (15–1)	Oregon State (18–1)	Oregon State (20–2)	Florida (25–5)	Florida (28–6)	Florida (32–6)	Florida (34–8)	Florida (36–10)	Florida (38–11)	Florida (41–12)	Florida (41–15)	Florida (42–17)	Oregon State (55–12–1)	1.
2.	Oregon State	Oregon State (3–0)	Oregon State (8–0)	Oregon State (12–0)	Florida (15–3)	Florida (18–4)	Florida (21–5)	Stanford (20–3)	NC State (25–6)	NC State (28–7)	NC State (31–8)	Stanford (33–6)	Stanford (37–6)	Oregon State (38–8–1)	Oregon State (42–9–1)	Oregon State (44–10–1)	Arkansas (48–21)	2.
3.	Florida State	Florida State (3–0)	Florida State (7–0)	Florida State (11–0)	Stanford (14-2)	Stanford (14–2)	Stanford (17–2)	Ole Miss (25–4)	Stanford (23–5)	Stanford (27–5)	Stanford (30–5)	Ole Miss (34–11)	North Carolina (32–13)	Stanford (38–8)	Stanford (43–8)	Stanford (43–10)	Florida (49–21)	3.
4.	Arkansas	Arkansas (3–0)	Stanford (8–0)	Stanford (11–1)	Kentucky (14–3)	Arkansas (16–4)	Ole Miss (22–3)	Florida State (22–7)	Arkansas (24–9)	Arkansas (27–10)	Texas Tech (32–9)	Arkansas (32–13)	Oregon State (35–7–1)	Ole Miss (39–13)	Ole Miss (42–14)	Ole Miss (46–15)	North Carolina (44–20)	4.
5.	Texas Tech	Texas Tech (4–0)	Texas Tech (6–0)	Texas Tech (13–0)	Clemson (15–1)	Florida State (16–4)	Florida State (20–5)	Oregon State (21–4)	Ole Miss (27–6)	Texas Tech (29–8)	Ole Miss (32–9)	North Carolina (31–13)	Ole Miss (36–13)	Arkansas (36–15)	North Carolina (37–17)	Florida State (43–17)	Texas Tech (45–20)	5.
6.	North Carolina	North Carolina (2–1)	Arkansas (5–2)	Arkansas (9–3)	Florida State (14–2)	Auburn (19–2)	Arkansas (17–7)	NC State (23–5)	Texas Tech (26–7)	Vanderbilt (22–14)	Oregon State (29–6)	Oregon State (32–7)	Arkansas (33–15)	North Carolina (34–16)	Clemson (43–13)	North Carolina (38–18)	Mississippi State (39–29)	6.
7.	TCU	TCU (2–1)	TCU (4–2)	TCU (7–3)	Arkansas (11–4)	Ole Miss (19–2)	Kentucky (17–7)	Texas Tech (23–6)	Clemson (25–7)	Ole Miss (29–8)	East Carolina (30–9)	NC State (31–11)	NC State (34–12)	NC State (39–12)	Texas Tech (38-15)	Clemson (45–14)	Texas (42–23)	7.
8.	Kentucky	Kentucky (4–0)	Kentucky (7–1)	Kentucky (11–1)	Texas Tech (15–2)	Kentucky (14–6)	Vanderbilt (17–7)	Clemson (22–6)	East Carolina (24–7)	Duke (30–7)	Arkansas (28–13)	UCLA (29–10)	Clemson(35–12)	Duke (38–12)	Georgia (37–17)	Arkansas (39–18)	Minnesota (44–15)	8.
9.	Stanford	Stanford (3–0)	Texas A&M (7–0)	Texas A&M (11–1)	TCU (8–4)	Vanderbilt (15–5)	Auburn (21–5)	Arkansas (19–9)	Florida State (24–9)	Kentucky (25–11)	UCLA (25–10)	Texas Tech (33–12)	Duke (35–11)	Clemson (39–13)	Arkansas (37–17)	Minnesota (41–13)	Washington (35–26)	9.
10.	Texas A&M	Texas A&M (3–0)	Clemson (7–0)	Clemson (10–1)	Texas A&M (16–1)	NC State (18–3)	NC State (20–4)	Duke (24–5)	Duke (27–6)	Oregon State (26–6)	North Carolina (27–13)	Clemson (34–11)	Texas Tech (35–14)	Texas Tech (35–15)	NC State (40–14)	Texas Tech (39–17)	Duke (45–18)	10.
11.	Cal State Fullerton	Clemson (3–0)	UCLA (6–1)	UCLA (9–2)	Ole Miss (15–1)	Texas Tech (17–5)	Texas Tech (21–5)	East Carolina (20–6)	Oregon State (24–6)	East Carolina (26–9)	Vanderbilt (24–16)	Duke (33–11)	UCLA (30–13)	Minnesota (34–13)	Minnesota (37–13)	Georgia (37–19)	Tennessee Tech (53–12)	11.
12.	Clemson	UCLA (3–0)	Ole Miss (7–0)	Ole Miss (10–1)	Louisville (14–1)	Clemson (16–4)	Clemson (18–6)	Southern Miss (19–7)	Southern Miss (22–9)	Indiana (26–6)	Duke (31–10)	Kentucky (29–15)	Georgia (33–14)	Georgia (35–16)	Duke (39–14)	East Carolina (43–16)	Stetson (48–13)	12.
13.	UCLA	Cal State Fullerton (0–3)	North Carolina (3–5)	North Carolina (7–5)	Auburn (15–1)	Texas A&M (17–4)	Duke (20–5)	Kentucky (19–9)	Kentucky (22–10)	Southern Miss (24–11)	Kentucky (26–14)	Southern Miss (32–11)	Southern Miss (35–12)	East Carolina (37–13)	Florida State (39–17)	Coastal Carolina (42–17)	Auburn (43–23)	13.
14.	Texas	Texas (2–1)	Virginia (4–3)	Virginia (8–4)	Vanderbilt (12–4)	Duke (16–4)	Southern Miss (17–5)	Vanderbilt (17–11)	Vanderbilt (19–13)	Clemson (26–10)	Clemson (29–11)	East Carolina (30–12)	East Carolina (33–12)	Florida State (37–16)	Texas (37–18)	Texas (37–20)	Stanford (45–12)	14.
15.	Virginia	Virginia (2–1)	Southern Miss (5–2)	Southern Miss (8–3)	Southern Miss (11–4)	Southern Miss (14–4)	UCLA (15–5)	Auburn (22–7)	Oklahoma (23–11)	UCLA (22–9)	Southern Miss (28–11)	Coastal Carolina (31–14)	Minnesota (32–12)	Texas (33–18)	Coastal Carolina (38–17)	NC State (40–16)	Ole Miss (48–17)	15.
16.	Ole Miss	Ole Miss (3–0)	LSU (4–3)	LSU (8–4)	UCLA (10–4)	UCLA (13–4)	Texas A&M (19–6)	Indiana (20–5)	Indiana (22–6)	Coastal Carolina (26–12)	Coastal Carolina (28–14)	Florida State (31–14)	Florida State (32–15)	Coastal Carolina (36–16)	UCLA (35–17)	Duke (40–15)	South Carolina (37–26)	16.
17.	LSU	Southern Miss (3–0)	Texas (4–3)	Texas (8–4)	LSU (11–6)	Louisville (16–4)	East Carolina (18–5)	LSU (18–11)	Coastal Carolina (23–11)	Florida State (24–12)	Florida State (29–12)	Vanderbilt (25–18)	Texas (33–18)	UCLA (31–16)	Southern Miss (39–15)	Southern Miss (43–16)	Vanderbilt (35–27)	17.
18.	Vanderbilt	Vanderbilt (2–1)	Vanderbilt (7–1)	Indiana (9–2)	Indiana (11–4)	LSU (14–7)	Indiana (16–5)	Coastal Carolina (21–9)	UCLA (19–8)	LSU (24–13)	Indiana (29–8)	Indiana (31–10)	Auburn (34–14)	Southern Miss (36–14)	Houston (33–21)	Stetson (45–11)	Cal State Fullerton(36–25)	18.
19.	Louisville	Louisville (3–0)	Louisville (7–0)	Louisville (11–0)	UCF (13–3)	Indiana (15–4)	TCU (13–7)	Oklahoma (20–10)	LSU (20–13)	North Carolina (24–12)	Texas (28–15)	Oklahoma State (27–14)	Coastal Carolina (32–16)	Kentucky (33–18)	East Carolina (39–15)	Houston (36–23)	Clemson (47–16)	19.
20.	Indiana	Indiana (2–1)	Indiana (6–1)	Auburn (12–0)	Duke (12–3)	UCF (17–4)	Louisville (18–6)	UCLA (16–7)	North Carolina (21–11)	Texas (24–14)	South Florida (26–14)	Texas (30–17)	Oklahoma State (28–17)	Houston (31–20)	Stetson (41–11)	UCLA (36–19)	Florida State (43–19)	20.
21.	Southern Miss	South Alabama (3–1)	South Alabama (7–1)	Vanderbilt (10–3)	East Carolina (12–3)	East Carolina (16–4)	LSU (16–9)	Georgia (21–7)	Georgia (23–9)	Oklahoma (26–13)	Tennessee Tech (34–5)	Houston (28–16)	Kentucky (30–17)	Stetson (40–11)	Tennessee Tech (46–7)	Connecticut (35–20–1)	Georgia (39–21)	21.
22.	UCF	LSU (1–2)	St. John's (7–0)	St. John's (8–1)	Sam Houston State (12–4)	Sam Houston State (16–4)	Illinois (15–5)	UCF (20–9)	Texas A&M (23–9)	Texas A&M (27–9)	Oklahoma (27–15)	Minnesota (28–12)	Stetson (37–11)	Tennessee Tech (44–6)	South Carolina (32–22)	Auburn (39–21)	NC State (42–18)	22.
23.	Mississippi State	St. John's (3–0)	UCF (4–3)	UCF (8–3)	NC State(13–3)	TCU (10–7)	San Diego State (16–7)	Texas A&M (21–8)	Auburn (23–10)	Dallas Baptist (23–10)	Minnesota (25–11)	South Florida (29–15)	South Florida (29–15)	South Carolina (30–21)	Auburn (37–19)	Missouri State (39–15)	East Carolina (44–18)	23.
24.	South Alabama	UCF (1–2)	Connecticut (4–2)	Coastal Carolina (10–3)	Illinois (8–4)	Illinois (11–5)	Coastal Carolina (19–7)	Louisville (19–8)	Texas (22–12)	Georgia (25–11)	Georgia (27–13)	Georgia (30–14)	Tennessee Tech (40–6)	Auburn (35–17)	Missouri State (35–15)	Louisville (43–16)	Coastal Carolina (43–19)	24.
25.	St. John's	Connecticut (2–1)	Auburn (8–0)	San Diego State (8–3)	San Diego State (10–5)	San Diego State (13–6)	UCF (18–8)	Dallas Baptist (16–9)	Dallas Baptist (19–10)	Illinois (23–8)	Jacksonville (28–13)	Tennessee Tech (37–6)	Connecticut (27–14)	Oklahoma State (29–19–1)	Mississippi State (31–24)	Tennessee Tech (48–9)	Houston (38–25)	25.
	Preseason Jan 23	Week 1 Feb 19	Week 2 Feb 26	Week 3 Mar 5	Week 4 Mar 12	Week 5 Mar 19	Week 6 Mar 26	Week 7 Apr 2	Week 8 Apr 9	Week 9 Apr 16	Week 10 Apr 23	Week 11 Apr 30	Week 12 May 7	Week 13 May 14	Week 14 May 21	Week 15 May 28	Final June 29	
		Dropped: 23. Mississippi State	Dropped: 13. Cal State Fullerton	Dropped: 21. South Alabama; 24. Connecticut	Dropped: 13. North Carolina; 14. Virginia; 17. Texas; 22. St. John's; 24. Coastal Carolina	None	Dropped: 22. Sam Houston State	Dropped: 19. TCU; 22. Illinois; 23. San Diego State	Dropped: 22. UCF; 24. Louisville	Dropped: 25. Auburn	Dropped: 18. LSU; 22. Texas A&M; 23. Dallas Baptist; 25. Illinois	Dropped: 22. Oklahoma; 25. Jacksonville	Dropped: 17. Vanderbilt; 18. Indiana; 21. Houston	Dropped: 23. South Florida; 25. Connecticut	Dropped: 19. Kentucky; 25. Oklahoma State	Dropped: 22. South Carolina; 25. Mississippi State	Dropped: No. 17 Southern Miss; No. 20 UCLA; No. 21 Connecticut; No. 23 Missouri State; No. 24 Louisville	

== Collegiate Baseball ==
	Preseason Dec 19	Week 1 Feb 19	Week 2 Feb 26	Week 3 Mar 5	Week 4 Mar 12	Week 5 Mar 19	Week 6 Mar 26	Week 7 Apr 2	Week 8 Apr 9	Week 9 Apr 16	Week 10 Apr 23	Week 11 Apr 30	Week 12 May 7	Week 13 May 14	Week 14 May 21	Week 15 May 28	Week 16 June 5	Week 17 June 11	Final June 29	
1.	Florida	Florida (3–0)	Oregon State (8–0)	Oregon State (12–0)	Oregon State (15–1)	Oregon State (18–1)	Oregon State (20–2)	Florida (25–5)	Florida (28–6)	Florida (32–6)	Stanford (30–5)	Stanford (33–6)	Stanford (37–6)	Florida (41–12)	Stanford (43–8)	Oregon State (44–10–1)	Oregon State (47–10–1)	Oregon State (49–10–1)	Oregon State (55–12–1)	1.
2.	Oregon State	Oregon State (3–0)	Florida (7–1)	Florida (12–1)	Clemson (15–1)	Stanford (14–2)	Stanford (17–2)	Stanford (20–3)	NC State (25–6)	NC State (28–7)	Florida (34–8)	Florida (36–10)	Florida (38–11)	Oregon State (38–8–1)	Florida (41–15)	Clemson (45–14)	Florida (45–18)	Florida (47–19)	Arkansas (48–21)	2.
3.	Arkansas	Arkansas (3–0)	Florida State (7–0)	Florida State (11–0)	Stanford (14–2)	Auburn (19–2)	Florida (21–5)	Oregon State (21–4)	Clemson (25–7)	Duke (30–7)	NC State (31–8)	UCLA (29–10)	North Carolina (32–13)	Stanford (39–8)	Oregon State (42–9–1)	Stanford (44–10)	North Carolina (41–18)	North Carolina (43–18)	Florida (49–21)	3.
4.	Florida State	Florida State (3–0)	Texas Tech (7–0)	Texas Tech (13–0)	Louisville (14–1)	Florida (18–4)	Vanderbilt (17–7)	NC State (23–5)	Duke (27–6)	UCLA (22–9)	UCLA (25–10)	North Carolina (31–13)	Oregon State (35–7–1)	Clemson (39–13)	Clemson (43–13)	Florida (42–17)	Arkansas (42–18)	Arkansas (44–19)	Mississippi State (39–29)	4.
5.	Texas Tech	Texas Tech (4–0)	Vanderbilt (7–1)	Kentucky (11–1)	Auburn (15–1)	Vanderbilt (15–5)	UCLA (15–5)	Ole Miss (25–4)	UCLA (19–8)	Stanford (27–5)	Oregon State (29–6)	Oregon State (32–7)	Clemson (35–12)	Arkansas (36–15)	North Carolina (37–17)	North Carolina (38–18)	Texas (40–20)	Texas (42–21)	North Carolina (44–20)	5.
6.	Vanderbilt	Vanderbilt (2–1)	Kentucky (7–1)	Clemson (10–1)	Florida (15–3)	UCLA (13–4)	NC State (20–4)	Clemson (22–6)	Stanford (23–5)	Arkansas (27–10)	North Carolina (27–13)	Arkansas (32–13)	Arkansas (33–15)	North Carolina (34–16)	Georgia (37–17)	Ole Miss (46–15)	Texas Tech (42–17)	Texas Tech (44–18)	Texas Tech (45–20)	6.
7.	North Carolina	North Carolina (2–1)	Clemson (7–0)	Stanford (11–1)	Florida State (14–2)	Arkansas (16–4)	Ole Miss (22–3)	Duke (24–5)	Arkansas (24–9)	Oregon State (26–6)	Michigan (24–11)	NC State (33–11)	NC State (34–12)	NC State (39–12)	Ole Miss (42–14)	Georgia (37–19)	Minnesota (44–13)	Washington (35–24)	Texas (42–23)	7.
8.	Kentucky	Kentucky (4–0)	Stanford (8–0)	Louisville (11–0)	Kentucky (14–3)	NC State (18–3)	Clemson (18–6)	Georgia (21–7)	Oregon State (24–6)	North Carolina (24–12)	Ole Miss (32–9)	Clemson (34–11)	UCLA (30–13)	Georgia (35–16)	NC State (40–14)	Southern Miss (43–16)	Stetson (48–11)	Mississippi State (37–27)	Washington (35–26)	8.
9.	TCU	TCU (2–1)	UCLA (6–1)	Auburn (12–0)	Texas Tech (15–2)	Ole Miss (19–2)	Florida State (20–5)	Florida State (22–7)	Ole Miss (27–6)	Vanderbilt (22–14)	Duke (31–10)	Duke (33–11)	Georgia (33–14)	Duke (38–12)	Arkansas (37–17)	NC State (40–16)	Duke (44–16)	Minnesota (44–15)	Minnesota (44–15)	9.
10.	LSU	Dallas Baptist (3–0)	Louisville (7–0)	Vanderbilt (10–3)	Texas A&M (16-1)	Clemson (16–4)	Louisville (18–6)	UCLA (16–7)	Georgia (23–9)	Ole Miss (29–8)	Arkansas (28–13)	Georgia (30–14)	Duke (35–11)	Ole Miss (39–13)	Duke (39–14)	Arkansas (39–18)	South Carolina (36–24)	Stetson (48–13)	Stetson (48–13)	10.
11.	Dallas Baptist	UCLA (3–0)	South Alabama (7–1)	UCLA (9–2)	Vanderbilt (12-4)	Louisville (16–4)	Texas Tech (21–5)	Louisville (19–8)	Oklahoma (23–11)	Michigan (22–11)	Texas Tech (32–9)	Ole Miss (34–11)	South Carolina (28–19)	South Carolina (30–21)	Southern Miss (39–15)	Duke (40–15)	Tennessee Tech (52–10)	Duke (45–18)	Duke (45–18)	11.
12.	Cal State Fullerton	Clemson (3–0)	TCU (4–2)	Indiana (9–2)	Stetson (13–1)	Florida State (16–4)	Illinois (15–5)	Texas Tech (23–6)	North Carolina (21–11)	Georgia (25–11)	Vanderbilt (24–16)	Oklahoma State (27–14–1)	Ole Miss (36–13)	St. John's (34–12)	Texas (37–18)	Texas (37–20)	Cal State Fullerton (35–23)	South Carolina (37–26)	South Carolina (37–26)	12.
13.	Mississippi State	Southern Miss (3–0)	San Diego (7–2)	LSU (8–4)	Ole Miss (15–1)	Stetson (17–3)	Duke (20–5)	Indiana (20–5)	Florida State (24–9)	Clemson (26–10)	Georgia (27–13)	Michigan (25–13)	Southern Miss (35–12)	Southern Miss (36–14)	Texas Tech (38–15)	Texas Tech (39–17)	Washington (33–23)	Tennessee Tech (53–12)	Tennessee Tech (53–12)	13.
14.	UCLA	Stanford (3–0)	LSU (4–3)	TCU (7–3)	UCLA (10–4)	Indiana (15–4)	Arkansas (17–7)	Arkansas (19–9)	Texas Tech (26–7)	Oklahoma (26–13)	Clemson (29–11)	South Carolina (26–18)	Oklahoma State (28–17–1)	Oklahoma State (29–19–1)	South Carolina (32–22)	Minnesota (41–13)	Auburn (42–21)	Cal State Fullerton (36–25)	Cal State Fullerton (36–25)	14.
15.	Clemson	LSU (1–2)	Arkansas (5–2)	Arkansas (9–3)	Indiana (11–4)	LSU (14–7)	Kentucky (17–7)	Illinois (17–7)	Indiana (22–6)	Texas Tech (29–8)	East Carolina (30–9)	Vanderbilt (25–18)	Michigan (29–14)	Minnesota (34–13)	Minnesota (37–13)	Florida State (43–17)	Vanderbilt (34–25)	Auburn (43–23)	Auburn (43–23)	15.
16.	Virginia	Virginia (2–1)	NC State (7–1)	Texas A&M (11–1)	LSU (11–6)	Kentucky (14–6)	Auburn (20–5)	Stetson (23–5)	Michigan (19–11)	Indiana (26–6)	St. John's (26–10)	Texas Tech (33–12)	Texas (33–18)	Texas (33–18)	Florida State (39–17)	Stetson (45–11)	Mississippi State (35–26)	Vanderbilt (35–27)	Vanderbilt (35–27)	16.
17.	South Alabama	South Alabama (3–1)	Texas A&M (7–0)	NC State (10–2)	TCU (9–4)	Texas Tech (17–5)	Indiana (16–5)	Vanderbilt (17–11)	Texas (22–12)	Illinois (23–8)	Oklahoma State (23–14–1)	Southern Miss (32–11)	St. John's (32–11)	Michigan (32–16)	Stetson (41–11)	Coastal Carolina (42–17)	Clemson (47–16)	Clemson (47–16)	Clemson (47–16)	17.
18.	Louisiana	Louisville (3–0)	Auburn (8–0)	Stetson (9–1)	Arkansas (11–4)	Texas A&M (17–4)	Wichita State (17–4)	East Carolina (20–6)	Illinois (19–8)	LSU (24–13)	Oklahoma (27–15)	Texas (30–17)	Minnesota (32–12)	Tennessee Tech (44–6)	St. John's (36–14)	East Carolina (43–16)	Stanford (46–12)	Stanford (46–12)	Stanford (46–12)	18.
19.	South Carolina	Texas (2–1)	Stetson (6–1)	Ole Miss (10–1)	NC State (13–3)	UNLV (18–3)	LSU (16–9)	Oklahoma (20–10)	East Carolina (24–7)	Texas A&M (27–9)	Florida State (29–12)	Houston (28–16)	Texas Tech (35–14)	Texas Tech (35–15)	Tennessee Tech (46–7)	South Carolina (33–24)	Ole Miss (48–17)	Mississippi (48–17)	Mississippi (48–17)	19.
20.	Miami (FL)	Louisiana (3–0)	Ole Miss (7–0)	St. John's (8–1)	Wichita State (12–2)	UCF (17–4)	Coastal Carolina (19–7)	Nevada (15–9)	Vanderbilt (19–13)	Louisville (24–11)	Tennessee Tech (34–5)	St. John's (28–11)	Houston (29–19)	Houston (31–20)	Oklahoma State (29–22–1)	St. John's (39–15)	Georgia (39–21)	Georgia (39–21)	Georgia (39–21)	20.
21.	Louisville	South Carolina (2–1)	St. John's (7–0)	Coastal Carolina (10–3)	UNLV (15–2)	Southern Miss (14–4)	Southern Miss (17–5)	LSU (18–11)	Louisville (20–11)	Tennessee Tech (29–5)	Auburn (29–12)	Tennessee Tech (37–6)	East Carolina (33–12)	East Carolina (37–13)	UCLA (35–17)	Louisville (43–17)	Southern Miss (44–18)	Southern Miss (44–18)	Southern Miss (44–18)	21.
22.	Missouri State	Miami (FL) (2–1)	Indiana (6–1)	Wichita State (8–1)	UCF (13–3)	Illinois (11–5)	Missouri (19–6)	Florida Gulf Coast (22–5)	Texas A&M (23–9)	Texas (24–14)	Texas A&M (29–11)	Texas A&M (32–12)	Tennessee Tech (40–6)	Florida State (37–16)	Houston (33–21)	Tennessee Tech (48–9)	NC State (42–18)	NC State (42–18)	NC State (42–18)	22.
23.	NC State	Missouri State (3–1)	South Carolina (6–2)	UNLV (11–1)	Southern Miss (11–4)	Duke (16–4)	Georgia (18–6)	Missouri (21–7)	LSU (20–13)	East Carolina (26–9)	Texas (28–15)	Minnesota (28–12)	Texas A&M (34–14)	Stetson (40–11)	South Florida (32–18–1)	UCLA (36–19)	Louisville (45–19)	Louisville (45–19)	Louisville (45–19)	23.
24.	Stanford	NC State (2–1)	Dallas Baptist (3–3)	Southern Miss (8–3)	Missouri (13–3)	Sam Houston State (16–4)	San Diego State (16–7)	Missouri State (19–7)	Missouri State (22–7)	St. John's (22–10)	Louisville (26–13)	Coastal Carolina (34–14)	Auburn (34–14)	Coastal Carolina (36–16)	Coastal Carolina (38–17)	Houston (36–23)	Oklahoma (38–25)	Oklahoma (38–25)	Oklahoma (38–25)	24.
25.	Southern Miss	Texas A&M (2–1)	Southern Miss (5–2)	Illinois (6–3)	Illinois (8–4)	Missouri (15–5)	Stetson (19–5)	Auburn (22–7)	Tennessee Tech (25–5)	Dallas Baptist (23–10)	South Carolina (23–17)	East Carolina (30–12)	Florida State (32–15)	Louisville (37–15)	Louisville (40–16)	Baylor (36–19)	UCLA (38–21)	UCLA (38–21)	UCLA (38–21)	25.
26.	Texas	Auburn (3–0)	Virginia (4–3)	Dallas Baptist (6–4)	Duke (12–3)	Wichita State (13–4)	UNLV (20–5)	Sam Houston State (20–7)	Sam Houston State (23–8)	Florida Atlantic (26–9)	Minnesota (25–11)	Florida State (34–14)	Oklahoma (31–18)	Oklahoma (33–19)	Connecticut (32–18–1)	Connecticut (35–20–1)	Houston (38–25)	Houston (38–25)	Houston (38–25)	26.
27.	Oklahoma State	Arizona (3–0)	Texas (4–3)	Virginia (8–4)	Florida Gulf Coast (13–2)	Coastal Carolina (15–7)	Texas A&M (19–6)	Coastal Carolina (21–9)	Florida Gulf Coast (24–7)	Arizona (22–12)	Indiana (29–8)	Oklahoma (28–18)	Stetson (37–11)	Baylor (30–18)	Purdue (34–18)	Purdue (37–19)	Connecticut (37–22–2)	Connecticut (37–22–1)	Connecticut (37–22–1)	27.
28.	Winthrop	Stetson (3–0)	Missouri State (4–2)	Texas (8–4)	Oregon (11–4)	Southeastern Louisiana (16–6)	East Carolina (18–5)	Wichita State (19–6)	Nevada (17–12)	Nevada (20–13)	Florida Atlantic (29–9–1)	Auburn (31–14)	Coastal Carolina (32–16)	LSU (31–21)	East Carolina (39–15)	Cal State Fullerton (32–22)	Coastal Carolina (43–19)	Coastal Carolina (43–19)	Coastal Carolina (43–19)	28.
29.	Georgia Tech	Ole Miss (3–0)	East Carolina (6–1)	Missouri State (6–3)	St. John's (8–4)	East Carolina (16–4)	TCU (14–7)	Southern Miss (19–7)	Coastal Carolina (23–11)	Coastal Carolina (26–12)	UC Irvine (24–14)	Louisville (29–14)	Louisville (32–15)	Missouri State (33–14)	Vanderbilt (31–14)	Missouri State (39–15)	East Carolina (44–18)	East Carolina (44–18)	East Carolina (44–18)	29.
30.	Houston	Notre Dame (2–1)	Alabama (7–0)	Georgia Tech (8–3)	Coastal Carolina (12–6)	Texas State (13–4–1)	Houston (16–8)	North Carolina (18–10)	Wichita State (22–7)	Minnesota (23–10)	Coastal Carolina (28–14)	Stetson (34–11)	Cal State Fullerton (25–20)	Cal State Fullerton (27–21)	Missouri State (35–15)	Washington (30–23)	St. John's (40–17)	St. John's (40–17)	St. John's (40–17)	30.
	Preseason Dec 19	Week 1 Feb 19	Week 2 Feb 26	Week 3 Mar 5	Week 4 Mar 12	Week 5 Mar 19	Week 6 Mar 26	Week 7 Apr 2	Week 8 Apr 9	Week 9 Apr 16	Week 10 Apr 23	Week 11 Apr 30	Week 12 May 7	Week 13 May 14	Week 14 May 21	Week 15 May 28	Week 16 June 5	Week 17 June 11	Final June 29	
		Dropped: 12. Cal State Fullerton; 13. Mississippi State; 27. Oklahoma State; 28. Winthrop; 29. Georgia Tech; 30. Houston	Dropped: 7. North Carolina; 20. Louisiana; 22. Miami (FL); 27. Arizona; 30. Notre Dame	Dropped: 13. San Diego; 23. South Carolina; 29. East Carolina; 30. Alabama	Dropped: 26. Dallas Baptist; 27. Virginia; 28. Texas; 29. Missouri State; 30. Georgia Tech	Dropped: 17. TCU; 27. Florida Gulf Coast; 28. Oregon; 29. St. John's	Dropped: 20. UCF; 24. Sam Houston State; 28. Southeastern Louisiana; 30. Texas State	Dropped: 15. Kentucky; 24. San Diego State; 26. UNLV; 27. Texas A&M; 29. TCU; 30. Houston	Dropped: 16. Stetson; 23. Missouri; 25. Auburn; 29. Southern Miss	Dropped: 13. Florida State; 24. Missouri State; 26. Sam Houston State; 27. Florida Gulf Coast; 30. Wichita State	Dropped: 17. Illinois; 18. LSU; 25. Dallas Baptist; 27. Arizona; 28. Nevada	Dropped: 27. Indiana; 28. Florida Atlantic; 29. UC Irvine	Dropped: 30. Vanderbilt	Dropped: 8. UCLA; 23. Texas A&M; 24. Auburn; 28. Coastal Carolina	Dropped: 17. Michigan; 26. Oklahoma; 27. Baylor; 28. LSU; 30. Cal State Fullerton	Dropped: 23. South Florida; 29. Vanderbilt; 30. Missouri State	Dropped: No. 24 Houston; No. 25 Baylor; No. 27 Purdue; No. 29 Missouri State	Dropped: None	Dropped: None	

The Preseason poll ranked the top 40 teams in the nation. Teams not listed above are: 31. San Diego; 32. Sam Houston State; 33. Texas A&M; 34. Kent State; 35. Auburn; 36. Arizona; 37. Stetson; 38. Ole Miss; 39 Nebraska; 40. Michigan.

== NCBWA ==
	Preseason Jan 31	Week 1 Feb 19	Week 2 Feb 26	Week 3 Mar 5	Week 4 Mar 12	Week 5 Mar 19	Week 6 Mar 26	Week 7 Apr 2	Week 8 Apr 9	Week 9 Apr 16	Week 10 Apr 23	Week 11 Apr 30	Week 12 May 7	Week 13 May 14	Week 14 May 21	Week 15 May 28	Week 16 June 5	Final June 28	
1.	Florida	Florida (3–0)	Florida (7–1)	Florida (12–1)	Oregon State (15–1)	Oregon State (18–1)	Oregon State (20–2)	Florida (25–5)	Florida (28–6)	Florida (32–6)	Stanford (30–5)	Stanford (33–6)	Stanford (37–6)	Florida (41–12)	Oregon State (42–9–1)	Oregon State (44–10–1)	Oregon State (47–10–1)	Oregon State (55–12–1)	1.
2.	Oregon State	Oregon State (3–0)	Oregon State (8–0)	Oregon State (12–0)	Florida (15–3)	Florida (18–4)	Florida (21–5)	Stanford (21–3)	Arkansas (24–9)	Stanford (27–5)	Florida (34–8)	Florida (36–10)	Florida (38–11)	Oregon State (38–8–1)	Stanford (43–8)	Ole Miss (46–15)	Florida (45–18)	Arkansas (48–20)	2.
3.	Texas Tech	Texas Tech (4–0)	Texas Tech (7–0)	Texas Tech (13–0)	Stanford (14–2)	Stanford (14–2)	Stanford (17–2)	Ole Miss (25–4)	Stanford (23–5)	Arkansas (27–10)	Texas Tech (32–9)	Oregon State (31–7)	Oregon State (35–7–1)	Stanford (39–8)	Florida (41–15)	Stanford (44–10)	North Carolina (41–18)	Florida (49–21)	3.
4.	Florida State	Arkansas (3–0)	Florida State (7–0)	Florida State (11–0)	Kentucky (14–3)	Arkansas (16–4)	Ole Miss (22–3)	Oregon State (21–4)	Texas Tech (26–7)	Texas Tech (29–8)	NC State (31–8)	Arkansas (32–13)	North Carolina (32–13)	NC State (39–12)	Ole Miss (42–14)	Florida (42–17)	Arkansas (42–18)	Mississippi State (3–29)	4.
5.	TCU	Florida State (3–0)	Stanford (8–0)	Kentucky (11–1)	Texas Tech (15–2)	Ole Miss (19–2)	Florida State (20–5)	Texas Tech (23–6)	Ole Miss (27–6)	NC State (28–7)	Oregon State (29–6)	North Carolina (31–13)	NC State (34–12)	Arkansas (36–15)	Clemson (43–13)	Clemson (45–14)	Texas Tech (42–17)	Texas Tech (45–20)	5.
6.	Arkansas	Kentucky (4–0)	Kentucky (7–1)	Stanford (11–1)	Florida State (14–2)	Florida State (16–4)	Arkansas (17–7)	Florida State (23–7)	NC State (25–6)	Oregon State (26–6)	Ole Miss (32–9)	UCLA (29–10)	Arkansas (33–15)	Ole Miss (39–13)	North Carolina (37–17)	Florida State (43–17)	Stetson (48–11)	North Carolina (44–20)	6.
7.	North Carolina	TCU (2–1)	TCU (4–2)	TCU (7–3)	Texas A&M (16–1)	Auburn (19–2)	Kentucky (17–7)	NC State (23–5)	Oregon State (24–6)	Kentucky (25–11)	Arkansas (28–13)	Ole Miss (34–11)	Clemson (35–12)	Clemson (39–13)	Florida State (39–17)	North Carolina (38–18)	Minnesota (43–13)	Texas (42–23)	7.
8.	Kentucky	North Carolina (2–1)	Texas A&M (7–0)	Texas A&M (11–1)	Ole Miss (15–1)	Vanderbilt (15–5)	Texas Tech (21–5)	Arkansas (19–9)	Clemson (25–7)	Ole Miss (29–8)	East Carolina (30–9)	Clemson (34–11)	Ole Miss (36–13)	North Carolina (34–16)	Arkansas (37–17)	Arkansas (39–18)	Texas (40–20)	Washington (35–26)	8.
9.	Texas A&M	Stanford (3–0)	Arkansas (5–2)	Ole Miss (10–1)	Arkansas (11–4)	Kentucky (14–6)	Vanderbilt (17–7)	Clemson (22–6)	Kentucky (22–10)	Duke (30–7)	UCLA (25–10)	Texas Tech (33–12)	Southern Miss (35–12)	Duke (38–12)	NC State (40–14)	Minnesota (40–13)	Auburn (42–21)	Duke (45–18)	9.
10.	Cal State Fullerton	Texas A&M (3–0)	Vanderbilt (7–1)	Arkansas (9–3)	Clemson (15–1)	Texas Tech (17–5)	NC State (20–4)	Kentucky (19–9)	Florida State (24–9)	Indiana (26–6)	Southern Miss (28–11)	NC State (31–11)	Texas Tech (35–14)	East Carolina (37–13)	Georgia (37–17)	East Carolina (43–16)	Duke (44–16)т	Auburn (43–23)	10.
11.	LSU	Vanderbilt (2–1)	UCLA (6–1)	UCLA (9–2)	TCU (9–4)	Texas A&M (17–4)	Auburn (20–5)	Indiana (20–5)	East Carolina (24–7)	Vanderbilt (22–14)	North Carolina (27–13)	Kentucky (29–15)	Duke (35–11) т	Florida State (37–16)	Texas Tech (38–15)	NC State (40–16)	Tennessee Tech (52–10) т	Tennessee Tech (53–12)	11.
12.	UCLA	UCLA (3–0)	Ole Miss (7–0)	Louisville (11–0)	Louisville (14–1)	UCLA (13–4)	Southern Miss (17–5)	Southern Miss (19–7)	Indiana (22–6)	UCLA (22–9)	Clemson (29–11)	Southern Miss (32–11)	UCLA (30–13) т	Minnesota (33–13)	Minnesota (36–13)	Southern Miss (43–16)	South Carolina (36–24)	South Carolina (37–26)	12.
13.	Stanford	Louisville (3–0)	Louisville (7–0)	Clemson (10–1)	Auburn (15–1)	NC State (18–3)	UCLA (15–5)	Duke (24–5)	Duke (27–6)	East Carolina (26–9)	Kentucky (26–14)	Duke (33–11)	East Carolina (33–12)	Southern Miss (36–14)	Texas (37–18)	Texas Tech (39–17)	Ole Miss (48–17)	Stetson (48–13)	13.
14.	Louisville	Ole Miss (3–0)	Clemson (7–0)	Vanderbilt (10–3)	Vanderbilt (12–4)	Southern Miss (14–4)	Clemson (18–6)	East Carolina (20–6)	Southern Miss (22–9)	Texas A&M (27–9)	Duke (31–10)	East Carolina (30–12)	Florida State (32–15)	Texas Tech (35–15)	Duke (39–14)	Stetson (45–11)	Cal State Fullerton (35–23)	Cal State Fullerton (36–25)	14.
15.	Vanderbilt	Southern Miss (3–0)	South Alabama (7–1)	Indiana (9–2)	Southern Miss (11–4)	Indiana (15–4)	Indiana (16–5)	Auburn (22–7)	UCLA (19–8)	Southern Miss (24–11)	Indiana (29–8)	Florida State (34–14)	Georgia (33–14)	Stetson (40–11)	East Carolina (39–15)	Coastal Carolina (42–17)	Vanderbilt (34–25)	Minnesota (43–15)	15.
16.	Ole Miss	Clemson (3–0)	Indiana (6–1)	Southern Miss (8–3)	UCLA (10–4)	Clemson (16–4)	Texas A&M (19–6)	Vanderbilt (17–11)	Vanderbilt (19–13)	Clemson (26–10)	Florida State (29–12)	Coastal Carolina (31–14)	Minnesota (31–12)	Georgia (35–16)	Southern Miss (39–15)	Georgia (37–19)	Mississippi State (35–26)	Vanderbilt (35–27)	16.
17.	Mississippi State	Virginia (2–1)	Southern Miss (5–2)	Auburn (12–0)	Indiana (11–4)	Louisville (16–4)	Duke (20–5)	UCLA (16–7)	Georgia (23–9)	Florida State (24–12)	Vanderbilt (24–16)	Indiana (31–10)	Texas (33–18)	Tennessee Tech (44-6)	Stetson (41–11)	Duke (40–15)	Washington (33–23)	Stanford (46–12)	17.
18.	Virginia	Dallas Baptist (3–0)	LSU (4–3)	Virginia (8–4)	East Carolina (12–3)	East Carolina (16–4)	East Carolina (18–5)	Texas A&M (21–8)	Oklahoma (23–11)	North Carolina (24–12)	Texas A&M (29–11)	Texas A&M (32–12)	Kentucky (30–17)	Texas (33–18)	Tennessee Tech (46–7)	Texas (37–20)	Stanford (46–12)	Ole Miss (48–17)	18.
19.	Clemson	Texas (2–1)	North Carolina (3–5)	LSU (8–4)	LSU (11–6)	Duke (16–4)	Louisville (18–6)	Georgia (21–7)	Texas A&M (23–9)	LSU (24–13)	Texas (28–15)	Oklahoma State (27–14–1)	Auburn (34–14) т	UCLA (31–16)	UCLA (35–17)	UCLA (36–19)	Clemson (47–16)	Clemson (47–16)	19.
20.	Dallas Baptist	South Alabama (3–1)	Virginia (4–3)	Texas (8–4)	NC State (13–3)	LSU (14–7)	TCU (14–7)	LSU (18–11)	Wichita State (22–7)	Coastal Carolina (26–12)	Coastal Carolina (28–14)	Texas (30–17)	Tennessee Tech (40–6) т	Kentucky (33–18)	Coastal Carolina (38–17)	Tennessee Tech (48–9)	Georgia (39–21)	Georgia (39–21)	20.
21.	Texas	LSU (1–2)	Texas (4–3)	North Carolina (7–5)	Mississippi State (10–6)	TCU (10–7)	LSU (16–9)	Coastal Carolina (21–9)	Coastal Carolina (23–11)	Oklahoma (26–13)	Tennessee Tech (34–5)	Georgia (30–14)	Coastal Carolina (32–16)	Coastal Carolina (36–16)	Auburn (37–19)	Auburn (39–21)	NC State (42–18)	NC State (42–18)	21.
22.	South Alabama	Cal State Fullerton (0–3)	Houston (4–2)	East Carolina (8–3)	Virginia (10–6)	UCF (17–4)	Wichita State (17–4)	Wichita State (19–6)	LSU (20–13)	Georgia (25–11)	Florida Atlantic (29–9)	Minnesota (28–12)	Connecticut (27–14–1)	Connecticut (30–16–1)	Houston (33–21)	Louisville (43–17)	Southern Miss (44–18)	Florida State (43–19)	22.
23.	Southern Miss	Indiana (2–1)	St. John's (7–0)	NC State (10–2)	UCF (13–3)	Virginia (13–7)	Coastal Carolina (19–7)	Louisville (19–8)	North Carolina (21–11)	Texas (24–14)	Georgia (27–13)	Tennessee Tech (37–6)	Stetson (37–11)	Auburn (35–17)	Connecticut (32–18–1)	Connecticut (35–20–1) т	East Carolina (44–18)	East Carolina (44–18)	23.
24.	Indiana	Houston (2–1)	East Carolina (6–1)	St. John's (8–1)	Duke (12–3)	UNLV (18–3)	UNLV (20–5)	Missouri (21–7)	Missouri State (22–7)	Wichita State (24–9)	Oklahoma (27–15)	Vanderbilt (25–18)	Texas A&M (34–14)	Houston (31–20)	Louisville (40–16)	Houston (36–23) т	Coastal Carolina (43–19)	Coastal Carolina (43–19)	24.
25.	Houston	Mississippi State (0–3)	Auburn (8–0)	Dallas Baptist (6–4)	UNLV (15–2)	Sam Houston State (16–4)	Illinois (15–5)	Oklahoma (20–10)	Auburn (23–10)	Florida Atlantic (26–9)	Auburn (29–12)	Connecticut (25–13–1)	Oklahoma State (28–17–1)	Oklahoma State (29–19–1)	South Carolina (32–22)	Texas A&M (39–20)	Florida State (43–19) т	Southern Miss (44–18)	25.
26.	Miami (FL)	Arizona (3–0)	NC State (7–1)	Mississippi State (6–5)	North Carolina (8–7)	Stetson (17–3)	San Diego State (16–7)	UNLV (22–7)	Florida Atlantic (24–8)	Tennessee Tech (29–5)	Connecticut (22–12–1)	South Florida (29–15)	South Florida (29–15)	Louisville (37–15)	Kentucky (34–21)	Missouri State (39–15)	UCLA (38–21) т	UCLA (38–21)	26.
27.	West Virginia	St. John's (3–0)	Mississippi State (3–4)	South Alabama (7–5)	Alabama (13–3)	North Carolina (12–8)	Georgia (18–6)	North Carolina (18–10)	Texas (22–12)	Auburn (25–12)	Minnesota (25–11)	Auburn (31–14)	Indiana (31–13)	Texas A&M (34–17)	Florida Atlantic (36–15–1)	Florida Atlantic (40–17–1)	Florida Atlantic (43–19–1)	Louisville (45–19)	27.
28.	NC State	Miami (FL) (2–1)	Dallas Baptist (3–3)	Coastal Carolina (10–1)	Stetson (13–1)	Wichita State (13–4)	UCF (18–8)	Louisiana Tech (22–8)	Missouri (23–9)	Dallas Baptist (23–10)	Oklahoma State (23–14–1)	Florida Atlantic (30–12–1)	Louisville (32–15)	Florida Atlantic (34–15–1)	Indiana (37–15) т	South Carolina (33–24)	Louisville (45–19)	Texas A&M (40–22)	28.
29.	UCF	NC State (2–1)	Alabama (7–0)	UCF (8–3)	Texas (9–7)	Alabama (16–5)	North Carolina (14–10)	Florida Atlantic (20–8)	Louisiana Tech (24–10)	Connecticut (19–11–1)	South Florida (26–14)	Houston (28–16)	Oklahoma (31–18)	St. John's (34–12) т	Mississippi State (31–24) т	Baylor (36–19)	Oklahoma (38–25)	Florida Atlantic (43–19–1)т	29.
30.	Arizona	Oregon (2–1)	San Diego (7–2)	Arkansas State (5–3)	Oregon (11–4)	Coastal Carolina (15–7)	College of Charleston (19–6) т Sam Houston State (17–7) т Stetson (19–5) т	Sam Houston State (20–7) т Stetson (23–5) т	Tennessee Tech (25–5)	Minnesota (23–10)	Wichita State (26–11)	Stetson (34–11)	St. John's (32–11)	South Carolina (30–21) т	Texas A&M (36–19)	Cal State Fullerton (32–23)	Connecticut (37–22–1)	Indiana (40–19)т	30.
	Preseason Jan 31	Week 1 Feb 19	Week 2 Feb 26	Week 3 Mar 5	Week 4 Mar 12	Week 5 Mar 19	Week 6 Mar 26	Week 7 Apr 2	Week 8 Apr 9	Week 9 Apr 16	Week 10 Apr 23	Week 11 Apr 30	Week 12 May 7	Week 13 May 14	Week 14 May 21	Week 15 May 28	Week 16 June 5	Final June 28	
		Dropped: 27. West Virginia; 29. UCF	Dropped: 22. Cal State Fullerton; 26. Arizona; 28. Miami (FL); 30. Oregon	Dropped: 22. Houston; 29. Alabama; 30. San Diego	Dropped: 24. St. John's; 25. Dallas Baptist; 27. South Alabama; 28. Coastal Carolina; 30. Arkansas State	Dropped: 21. Mississippi State; 29. Texas; 30. Oregon	Dropped: 23. Virginia; 29. Alabama	Dropped: 20. TCU; 25. Illinois; 26. San Diego State; 28. UCF; 30. College of Charleston	Dropped: 23. Louisville; 26. UNLV; 30. Sam Houston State; 30. Stetson	Dropped: 24. Missouri State; 28. Missouri; 29. Louisiana Tech	Dropped: 19. LSU; 28. Dallas Baptist	Dropped: 24. Oklahoma; 30. Wichita State	Dropped: 24. Vanderbilt; 28. Florida Atlantic; 29. Houston	Dropped: 26. South Florida; 27. Indiana; 29. Oklahoma	Dropped: 25. Oklahoma State; 29. St. John's	Dropped: 26. Kentucky; 28. Indiana; 28. Mississippi State	Dropped: No. 23 Houston; No. 25 Texas A&M; No. 26 Missouri State; No. 29 Baylor; No. 30 Cal State Fullerton	Dropped: No. 29 Oklahoma; No. 30 Connecticut	

The Preseason poll ranked the top 35 teams in the nation. Teams not listed above are: 31. Dallas Baptist; 32. South Carolina; 33. Oklahoma; 34. LSU; 35. Missouri State.
