= Eugene Pare =

American academic and coach (1915–2000)

Biographical details
- Born: December 12, 1915; Lynn, Massachusetts, U.S.
- Died: May 26, 2000 (aged 84); Pullman, Washington, U.S.
- Education: Tufts University

Playing career

Cross country
- 1934–1938: Tufts

Coaching career (HC unless noted)

Men's basketball
- 1938–1941: Wayland HS (MA)
- 1945–1946: Northeastern

Baseball
- 1945: Northeastern

Head coaching record
- Overall: 4–13 (.235) (Basketball); 3–6 (.333) (Baseball)

Eugene George Pare (December 12, 1915 – May 26, 2000) was an American academic and coach who taught at Northeastern University, the Illinois Institute of Technology, and Washington State University and was the head coach of the Northeastern Huskies baseball team in 1945 and the Northeastern Huskies men's basketball during the 1945–46 season.

== Early life ==
Pare was born in Lynn, Massachusetts. He ran track at Lynn English High School and was captain of the Tufts University cross country team. He received a bachelor of science in civil engineering from Tufts in 1937 and a master of education degree from the same institution the following year. He earned postgraduate degrees from Northeastern University and the Massachusetts Institute of Technology.

== Career ==
From 1938 to 1941, Pare taught at Wayland High School in Wayland, Massachusetts, where he was also the head basketball coach and assistant baseball and football coach. In 1941, he became an instructor of drawing at Northeastern. In 1945, he was named head coach of the school's baseball team. He led the team to a 3–6 record. He was also put in charge of the men's basketball team. The Huskies went 4–13 in his only season as head coach.

In 1946, Pare left Northeastern for a teaching position at the Illinois Institute of Technology. In 1956, he accepted a professorship in mechanical engineering at Washington State University. He retired in 1985 and resided in Marina del Rey, California until 1999, when he and his wife returned to Pullman, Washington. He died on May 26, 2000.
