= Madison Jeffery =

American college baseball and basketball coach

Biographical details
- Born: April 4, 1895
- Died: January 4, 1972 (aged 76)

Coaching career (HC unless noted)

Men's basketball
- 1923–1925: Northeastern

Baseball
- 1924–1925: Northeastern

Head coaching record
- Overall: 8–25 (.242) (Basketball); 11–15 (.423) (Baseball)

Madison Peters Jeffery (April 4, 1895 – January 4, 1972) was an American athlete and coach who was the head coach of the Northeastern Huskies men's basketball team from 1921 to 1923 and the Northeastern Huskies baseball team in 1922 and 1923.

== Biography ==
Jeffery graduated from Malden High School in Malden, Massachusetts in 1914. He attended Tufts College, where he played three seasons of football and two seasons of baseball. He was a member of the Jumbos squad that upset the 1916 Harvard Crimson football team. During World War I, he served in the United States Navy's air service. In 1919, he was awarded a war certificate from Tufts. In 1920, he was an unsuccessful canadiate for the Massachusetts House of Representatives.

Jeffery was an English instructor at the Wagner School during the 1919–20 school year. In 1921, he joined the faculty at Northeastern College (now Northeastern University) as an instructor of English and coach. He compiled a 8–25 record in his two seasons as basketball coach and a 11–15 record in his two seasons as baseball coach. He later worked as director of admissions at Dean Academy and Junior College.
