= Northeastern Huskies baseball =

American college baseball team

Northeastern Huskies
- 2026 Northeastern Huskies baseball team
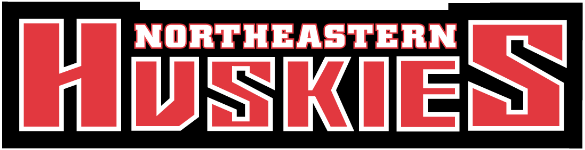
- Founded: 1921; 105 years ago
- University: Northeastern University
- Head coach: Mike Glavine (12th season)
- Conference: Coastal Athletic
- Location: Brookline, Massachusetts
- Home stadium: Parsons Field (capacity: 3,000)
- Nickname: Huskies
- Colors: Red and black

College World Series appearances
- 1966

NCAA tournament appearances
- 1964, 1966, 1972, 1973, 1994, 1997, 2003, 2018, 2021, 2023, 2025, 2026

Conference tournament champions
- AEC: 1994, 1997, 2003; CAA: 2021, 2025, 2026

Conference regular season champions
- AEC: 2004, 2005; CAA: 2017, 2018, 2021, 2025

Northeastern Huskies baseball is the varsity intercollegiate team representing Northeastern University in the sport of college baseball at the Division I level of the National Collegiate Athletic Association (NCAA). The team is led by Mike Glavine, and plays its home games at Parsons Field just off campus in Brookline, Massachusetts. The Huskies are members of the Coastal Athletic Association, which they joined in 2006.

== Northeastern in the NCAA tournament ==
Year	Record	Pct	Notes
1964	0–2	.000	District 1
1966	2–2	.500	College World Series 7th place, District 1 Champion
1972	1–2	.333	District 1
1973	1–2	.333	District 1
1994	0–2	.000	Mideast Regional
1997	0–2	.000	West Regional
2003	0–2	.000	Baton Rouge Regional
2018	0–2	.000	Raleigh Regional
2021	0–2	.000	Fayetteville Regional
2023	0–2	.000	Winston-Salem Regional
2025	1–2	.333	Tallahassee Regional
2026	1–2	.333	Lawrence Regional
TOTALS	6-24	.200	

== Season-by-season records ==
Year	Overall record									Postseason	Head coach
Year	W	L	T	Win %						Postseason	Head coach
1921	2	6	1	.278							Arthur Duffey
1922	5	9	0	.357							Madison Jeffery
1923	6	6	0	.500							Madison Jeffrey
1924	3	6	0	.333							Rufus Bond
1925	1	11	0	.083							Rufus Bond
1926	7	6	0	.538							Rufus Bond
1927	9	5	0	.643							Rufus Bond
1928	4	6	0	.400							Rufus Bond
1929	4	9	0	.308							Rufus Bond
1930	2	13	0	.133							Alfred McCoy
1931	7	9	1	.441							Alfred McCoy
1932	8	7	0	.533							Alfred McCoy
1933	7	7	0	.500							Alfred McCoy
1934	12	2	0	.857							Alfred McCoy
1935	9	8	0	.529							Alfred McCoy
1936	5	11	0	.313							Alfred McCoy
1937	8	11	0	.421							Alfred McCoy
1938	10	7	0	.588							Herb Gallagher
1939	11	6	0	.647							Herb Gallagher
1940	10	3	0	.769							Herb Gallagher
1941	12	4	0	.750							Herb Gallagher
1942	12	3	0	.800							Herb Gallagher
1943	4	11	0	.267							Emanuel Flumere
1944	5	4	1	.550							Emanuel Flumere
1945	3	6	0	.333							Eugene Pare
1946	7	5	0	.583							Herb Gallagher
1947	5	11	0	.313							Herb Gallagher
1948	9	7	0	.563							Herb Gallagher
1949	9	9	0	.500							Herb Gallagher
1950	7	9	0	.438							Herb Gallagher
1951	8	9	0	.471							Herb Gallagher
Year	Overall Record									Post Season	Head coach
Year	W	L	T	Win %						Post Season	Head coach
1952	12	6	0	.667							Herb Gallagher
1953	7	10	0	.412							Herb Gallagher
1954	13	5	1	.711							Herb Gallagher
1955	9	10	1	.475							Herb Gallagher
1956	14	7	0	.667							John Connelly
1957	12	10	1	.543							John Connelly
1958	7	12	0	.368							John Connelly
1959	8	9	1	.472							John Connelly
1960	9	9	0	.500							John Connelly
Year	Overall Record									Post Season	Head coach
Year	W	L	T	Win %						Post Season	Head coach
1961	5	12	0	.294							John Connelly
1962	10	10	0	.500							John Connelly
1963	12	6	0	.667							John Connelly
1964	14	6	0	.700						NCAA District 1 Finals	John Connelly
1965	13	8	0	.619							John Connelly
1966	18	8	0	.692						CWS 1st Round	John Connelly
1967	7	10	0	.412							John Connelly
1968	11	9	0	.550							John Connelly
1969	8	11	0	.421							John Connelly
1970	9	9	1	.500							John Connelly
1971	8	13	0	.381							John Connelly
1972	17	7	0	.708						NCAA District 1 Semifinals	John Connelly
1973	15	8	1	.646						NCAA District 1 Semifinals	John Connelly
1974	13	10	0	.565							John Connelly
1975	12	12	0	.500							John Connelly
1976	13	13	0	.500							John Connelly
1977	9	16	0	.333							John Connelly
1978	6	22	0	.214							John Connelly
1979	14	12	0	.538							John Connelly
1980	14	12	0	.538							John Connelly
1981	10	19	0	.345							John Connelly
1982	8	17	1	.327							Charles O'Malley
1983	16	17	0	.485							Charles O'Malley
1984	20	20	0	.500							Charles O'Malley
Year	Overall Record				ECAC North Record					Post Season	Head coach
Year	W	L	T	Win %	W	L	T	Win %		Post Season	Head coach
1985	14	19	0	.424	3	8	0	.273			Charles O'Malley
1986	25	14	0	.641	9	5	0	.643			Neil McPhee
1987	20	14	0	.588	9	6	0	.600			Neil McPhee
1988	19	23	1	.453	7	8	0	.467			Neil McPhee
1989	21	20	1	.512	5	10	0	.333			Neil McPhee
Year	Overall Record				NAC Record				Beanpot Results		Head coach
Year	W	L	T	Win %	W	L	T	Win %	Beanpot Results		Head coach
1990	26	20	0	.565	9	6	0	.600	3rd		Neil McPhee
1991	35	15	0	.700	12	3	0	.800	3rd		Neil McPhee
1992	22	18	1	.549	16	12	0	.571	2nd		Neil McPhee
1993	17	19	0	.472	7	14	0	.333	No Consolation Game		Neil McPhee
1994	35	16	0	.686	18	6	0	.750	1st	NCAA Mideast Regional	Neil McPhee
1995	29	17	0	.630	16	8	0	.667	1st		Neil McPhee
1996	18	26	0	.409	11	11	0	.500	2nd		Neil McPhee
Year	Overall Record				America East Record				Beanpot Results		Head coach
Year	W	L	T	Win %	W	L	T	Win %	Beanpot Results		Head coach
1997	33	19	0	.635	12	12	0	.500	No Consolation Game	NCAA West Regional	Neil McPhee
1998	26	22	0	.542	17	9	0	.654	4th		Neil McPhee
1999	28	21	0	.571	18	10	0	.643	4th		Neil McPhee
2000	25	24	0	.510	15	11	0	.577	2nd		Neil McPhee
2001	19	32	0	.373	11	17	0	.393	3rd		Neil McPhee
2002	29	22	0	.569	11	11	0	.500	1st		Neil McPhee
2003	27	24	0	.529	12	10	0	.545	3rd	NCAA Baton Rouge Regional	Neil McPhee
2004	28	20	0	.583	14	6	0	.700	2nd		Neil McPhee
2005	26	23	0	.531	14	6	0	.700	2nd		Neil McPhee
Year	Overall Record				CAA Record				Beanpot Results		Head coach
Year	W	L	T	Win %	W	L	T	Win %	Beanpot Results		Head coach
2006	27	23	0	.540	19	10	0	.655	3rd		Neil McPhee
2007	24	22	0	.522	12	17	0	.414	1st		Neil McPhee
2008	25	26	1	.490	12	17	1	.417	3rd		Neil McPhee
2009	28	25	0	.528	13	11	0	.542	1st		Neil McPhee
2010	13	31	0	.295	5	19	0	.208	2nd		Neil McPhee
2011	18	33	0	.353	12	18	0	.400	4th		Neil McPhee
2012	23	28	0	.451	13	7	0	.433	4th		Neil McPhee
2013	31	26	0	.544	12	15	0	.444	1st		Neil McPhee
2014	26	29	0	.456	9	12	0	.429	3rd		Mike Glavine
2015	25	30	0	.455	14	10	0	.583	3rd		Mike Glavine
2016	31	27	0	.534	12	11	0	.522	2nd		Mike Glavine
2017	29	25	0	.537	16	7	0	.696	4th		Mike Glavine
2018	36	21	0	.632	17	6	0	.739	2nd	NCAA Raleigh Regional	Mike Glavine
2019	28	29	0	.491	12	12	0	.500	4th		Mike Glavine
2020	10	5	0	.667	0	0	0		Canceled		Mike Glavine
2021	36	10	0	.783	20	3	0	.870	Canceled	NCAA Fayetteville Regional	Mike Glavine
2022	31	29	1	.516	10	14	0	.417	3rd		Mike Glavine
2023	44	14	0	.759	20	10	0	.667	3rd	NCAA Winston-Salem Regional	Mike Glavine
2024	38	17	0	.690	18	9	0	.667	1st		Mike Glavine
2025	49	11	0	.816	25	2	0	.925	1st	NCAA Tallahassee Regional	Mike Glavine
2026	34	19	0	.642	22	8	0	.733	2nd	TBD	Mike Glavine
