= Alfred McCoy (American football) =

American football player and sports coach (1899–1990)

- McCoy pictured in The Cauldron 1934, Northeastern yearbook

Biographical details
- Born: October 7, 1899; Brookline, Massachusetts, U.S.
- Died: January 28, 1990 (aged 90); La Jolla, California, U.S.
- Education: Lafayette College

Playing career

Football
- 1922: Penn State
- 1924–1926: Lafayette
- Position: End

Coaching career (HC unless noted)

Football
- 1927–1928: Hackettstown HS (NJ)
- 1933–1936: Northeastern
- 1937–1940: Colby
- 1941–1946: Harvard (backfield)
- 1947–1948: Boston Yanks (scout)
- 1949–1950: Washington (assistant)

Basketball
- 1929–1937: Northeastern

Baseball
- 1930–1937: Northeastern

Head coaching record
- Overall: 35–16–8 (football); 62–58 (basketball); 59–68–1 (baseball)

Alfred Mudge McCoy (October 7, 1899 – January 28, 1990) was an American football player and coach of football, basketball, and baseball. He served as head football coach at Northeastern University and Colby College and was the head baseball and men's basketball coach at Northeastern.

== Early life ==
A native of Brookline, Massachusetts, McCoy attended Newton High School and Dean Academy. As a youth he excelled in football, swimming, and baseball. He was awarded a medal from the Massachusetts Humane Society for saving a girl from drowning in Crystal Lake. He attended the College of the Holy Cross for one semester but had to leave due to poor health. He enrolled at Pennsylvania State University in 1921. He was a member of the Penn State team that played in the 1923 Rose Bowl. After the game, McCoy missed his midterms due to a blizzard that trapped him in his wife's home town of Syracuse, New York. He could not afford the $5 an exam fee to retake the test so he dropped out of school and worked on a railroad. McCoy resumed his education after he was recruited to play football at Lafayette College by coach Jock Sutherland.

== Coaching ==
After graduating from Lafayette College in 1927, McCoy became the coach for all athletics at Hackettstown High School in Hackettstown, New Jersey. In 1929 he joined the faculty of Northeastern University as an English professor and head baseball and men's basketball coach. In 1932, with the assistance of engineering school dean Carl Ell and athletic director Putty Parsons, McCoy established a freshman football team at Northeastern. The following year the school began its varsity football program. After a 1-3-1 first season, McCoy would not have a losing season as Northeastern's football coach.

In 1937, McCoy left Northeastern to become the head football coach at Colby College. In 1941, he was hired as backfield coach for the Harvard Crimson football team. In 1947 he became the chief scout for the Boston Yanks of the National Football League. McCoy's final coaching position came as an assistant at the University of Washington.

== Later life ==
After his coaching career ended, McCoy moved to La Jolla, California, where he was a successful liquor store owner and a golf writer for the San Diego Tribune. In 1982 he was inducted into Northeastern's Hall of Fame. He died on January 31, 1990, in La Jolla, aged 90.

== Head coaching record ==
=== Football ===
Year	Team	Overall	Conference	Standing	Bowl/playoffs
Northeastern Huskies (Independent) (1933–1936)
1933	Northeastern	1–3–1			
1934	Northeastern	6–1–1			
1935	Northeastern	5–0–3			
1936	Northeastern	5–4			
Northeastern:		17–8–5			
Colby Mules () (1937–1940)
Colby:		18–8–3			
Total:		35–16–8			
