= Jim Bowman (basketball) =

American basketball coach

Playing career
- 1960–1965: Northeastern

Coaching career (HC unless noted)
- 1967–1969: Waltham HS (MA) (assistant)
- 1969–1971: Northeastern (assistant)
- 1971–1972: Northeastern

Head coaching record
- Overall: 12–9

James Bowman is an American former basketball player and coach at Northeastern University. He was interim head coach of the Northeastern Huskies men's basketball team during the 1971–1972 season.

== Playing ==
Bowman was a standout basketball player at Quincy High School in Quincy, Massachusetts and was named to the All-Greater Boston League team in his senior season. He played college basketball at Northeastern and averaged 2.0 points and 1.4 rebounds per game in his first varsity season. He did not play during the 1962–63 season, but was the team's fourth leading scorer during his junior season, averaging 8.7 points per game. On February 11, 1964, Bowman scored the game-winning basket in Northeastern's 73–71 victory over Boston College, NU's first-ever basketball victory over BC. Northeastern finished the year with a 17-8 record and played in the 1964 NCAA College Division basketball tournament, where they lost in the northeast regional finals to Adelphi University. Bowman put up double-digit points in both of Northeastern's tournament games. Bowman was the Huskies' only returning senior in 1964-65 and was named team captain. He averaged a then school record 17.2 points per game along with 10.5 rebounds per game. He is one of only five Northeastern players to average a double-double for a season, the others being Fran Ryan, Jim Moxley, Mark Halsel, and Reggie Lewis. He was named the team's most valuable player and was a 1965 Beanpot All-Star Team and First Team All-New England selection.

== Coaching ==
In 1967, Bowman took a teaching job at Waltham High School in Waltham, Massachusetts. He also served as the school's assistant basketball coach. In 1969, Bowman returned to Northeastern as an assistant under Dick Dukeshire. In 1971, Dukeshire was granted a one year sabbatical to coach the Greece men's national basketball team and Bowman replaced him on an interim basis. He led the Huskies to a 12-9 record in his only season as head coach. With Dukeshire expected to return for the 1972–73 season, Bowman resigned in September 1972 to accept a job with the Federal Bureau of Investigation. However, due to illness, Dukeshire was unable to resume his duties and Northeastern hired a local high school coach, Jim Calhoun, who went on to become a member of the Basketball Hall of Fame.

== Post-coaching career ==
Bowman was a special agent for the FBI for nearly 30 years. In 2013, he was inducted into the Northeastern Varsity Club Hall of Fame.
