= 2018 Southeastern Conference baseball tournament =

- Teams: 12
- Format: See below
- Finals site: Hoover Metropolitan Stadium; Hoover, AL
- Champions: Ole Miss (3rd title)
- Winning coach: Mike Bianco (2nd title)
- MVP: Nick Fortes (Ole Miss)
- Television: SEC Network, ESPN (championship game)

2018 Southeastern Conference baseball standings
| | Conf. | | | | Overall |
| Team | W | | L | PCT | W | | L | PCT |
|---|---|---|---|---|---|---|---|---|
East Division
| No. 3 Florida ^{x}‍†‍‍^{y} | 20 | – | 10 | .667 | 49 | – | 21 | .700 |
| No. 20 Georgia ‍‍‍^{y} | 18 | – | 12 | .600 | 39 | – | 21 | .650 |
| No. 12 South Carolina ‍‍‍^{y} | 17 | – | 13 | .567 | 37 | – | 26 | .587 |
| No. 16 Vanderbilt ‍‍‍^{y} | 16 | – | 14 | .533 | 35 | – | 27 | .565 |
| Kentucky ‍‍‍ | 13 | – | 17 | .433 | 34 | – | 22 | .607 |
| Missouri ‍‍‍ | 12 | – | 18 | .400 | 34 | – | 22 | .607 |
| Tennessee ‍‍‍ | 12 | – | 18 | .400 | 29 | – | 27 | .518 |
West Division
| No. 19 Ole Miss ^{x}‍‍‡‍^{y} | 18 | – | 12 | .600 | 48 | – | 18 | .727 |
| No. 2 Arkansas ^{x}‍‍‍^{y} | 18 | – | 12 | .600 | 48 | – | 21 | .696 |
| No. 15 Auburn ‍‍‍^{y} | 15 | – | 15 | .500 | 43 | – | 23 | .652 |
| LSU ‍‍‍^{y} | 15 | – | 15 | .500 | 39 | – | 27 | .591 |
| No. 4 Mississippi State ‍‍‍^{y} | 15 | – | 15 | .500 | 39 | – | 29 | .574 |
| Texas A&M ‍‍‍^{y} | 13 | – | 17 | .433 | 40 | – | 22 | .645 |
| Alabama ‍‍‍ | 8 | – | 22 | .267 | 27 | – | 29 | .482 |
x – Division champion † – Conference champion ‡ – Tournament champion y – Invited to the NCAA tournament Rankings from Collegiate Baseball

The 2018 Southeastern Conference baseball tournament was held from May 22 through 27 at Hoover Metropolitan Stadium in Hoover, Alabama. The annual tournament determined the tournament champion of the Division I Southeastern Conference in college baseball. The tournament champion earned the conference's automatic bid to the 2018 NCAA Division I baseball tournament

The tournament has been held every year since 1977, with LSU claiming twelve championships, the most of any school. Original members Georgia and Kentucky along with 1992 addition Arkansas have never won the tournament. This is the twentieth consecutive year and twenty-second overall that the event has been held at Hoover Metropolitan Stadium, known from 2007 through 2012 as Regions Park. Texas A&M joined in 2013, and won its first title in 2016. Missouri, which also joined in 2013, has yet to win the event.

== Format and seeding ==
The regular season division winners claimed the top two seeds and the next ten teams by conference winning percentage, regardless of division, claimed the remaining berths in the tournament. The bottom eight teams played a single-elimination opening round, followed by a double-elimination format until the semifinals, when the format reverted to single elimination through the championship game. This was the sixth year of this format.

| Team | W–L | Pct | GB #1 | Seed |
|---|---|---|---|---|
Eastern Division
| Florida | 20–10 | .667 | – | 1 |
| Georgia | 18–12 | .600 | 2 | 3 |
| South Carolina | 17–13 | .567 | 3 | 5 |
| Vanderbilt | 16–14 | .533 | 4 | 6 |
| Kentucky | 13–17 | .433 | 7 | 10 |
| Missouri | 12–18 | .400 | 8 | 12 |
| Tennessee | 12–18 | .400 | 8 | – |

| Team | W–L | Pct | GB #1 | Seed |
|---|---|---|---|---|
Western Division
| Ole Miss | 18–12 | .600 | 2 | 2 |
| Arkansas | 18–12 | .600 | 2 | 4 |
| Auburn | 15–15 | .500 | 5 | 7 |
| LSU | 15–15 | .500 | 5 | 8 |
| Mississippi State | 15–15 | .500 | 5 | 9 |
| Texas A&M | 13–17 | .433 | 7 | 11 |
| Alabama | 8–22 | .267 | 12 | – |

== Bracket ==
First round SECN
6 | Vanderbilt | 1
11 | Texas A&M | 3
7 | Auburn | 4
10 | Kentucky | 3^{11}
8 | LSU | 8
9 | Mississippi State | 5
5 | South Carolina | 4
12 | Missouri | 2

Second round SECN
3 | Georgia | 0
11 | Texas A&M | 7
2 | Ole Miss | 3
7 | Auburn | 9
3 | Georgia | 4
2 | Ole Miss | 5^{10}
1 | Florida | 4
8 | LSU | 3
4 | Arkansas | 13
5 | South Carolina | 8
8 | LSU | 6
5 | South Carolina | 4^{12}

Third round SECN
11 | Texas A&M | 4
7 | Auburn | 2
2 | Ole Miss | 7
7 | Auburn | 0
1 | Florida | 2
4 | Arkansas | 8
8 | LSU | 11
1 | Florida | 0^{7}

Semifinals; SECN
11 | Texas A&M | 1
2 | Ole Miss | 2
4 | Arkansas | 1
8 | LSU | 2

Final; ESPN2
2 | Ole Miss | 9
8 | LSU | 1

== Schedule ==
| Game | Time* | Matchup^{#} | Television | Attendance |
Tuesday, May 22
| 1 | 9:30 a.m. | No. 6 Vanderbilt vs. No. 11 Texas A&M | SEC Network | 5,514 |
| 2 | 1:00 p.m. | No. 7 Auburn vs. No. 10 Kentucky | SEC Network | 5,514 |
| 3 | 4:30 p.m. | No. 8 LSU vs. No. 9 Mississippi State | SEC Network | 8,072 |
| 4 | 8:00 p.m. | No. 5 South Carolina vs. No. 12 Missouri | SEC Network | 8,072 |
Wednesday, May 23
| 5 | 9:30 a.m. | No. 3 Georgia vs. No. 11 Texas A&M | SEC Network | 7,126 |
| 6 | 1:00 p.m. | No. 2 Ole Miss vs. No. 7 Auburn | SEC Network | 7,126 |
| 7 | 4:30 p.m. | No. 1 Florida vs. No. 8 LSU | SEC Network | 6,710 |
| 8 | 8:00 p.m. | No. 4 Arkansas vs. No. 5 South Carolina | SEC Network | 6,710 |
Thursday, May 24
| 9 | 9:30 a.m. | No. 3 Georgia vs. No. 2 Ole Miss | SEC Network | 7,197 |
| 10 | 1:00 p.m. | No. 8 LSU vs. No. 5 South Carolina | SEC Network | 7,197 |
| 11 | 4:30 p.m. | No. 11 Texas A&M vs. No. 7 Auburn | SEC Network | 9,651 |
Friday, May 25
| 12 | 10:00 a.m. | No. 1 Florida vs. No. 4 Arkansas | SEC Network | 1,384 |
| 13 | 3:00 p.m. | No. 2 Ole Miss vs. No. 7 Auburn | SEC Network | 8,945 |
| 14 | 6:30 p.m. | No. 8 LSU vs. No. 1 Florida | SEC Network | 8,945 |
Semifinals – Saturday, May 26
| 15 | Noon | No. 2 Ole Miss vs. No. 11 Texas A&M | SEC Network | 10,381 |
| 16 | 3:00 p.m. | No. 8 LSU vs. No. 4 Arkansas | SEC Network | 10,381 |
Championship – Sunday, May 27
| 17 | 2:00 p.m. | No. 2 Ole Miss vs. No. 8 LSU | ESPN | 14,126 |
*Game times in CDT. # – Rankings denote tournament seed.
