= 2018 LSU Tigers baseball team =

American college baseball season

2018 LSU Tigers baseball
- Conference: Southeastern Conference
- Record: 39–27 (15–15 SEC)
- Head coach: Paul Mainieri (12th season)
- Hitting coach: Micah Gibbs (2nd season)
- Pitching coach: Alan Dunn (7th season)
- Home stadium: Alex Box Stadium, Skip Bertman Field

2018 Southeastern Conference baseball standings
	Conf.				Overall
Team	W		L	PCT	W		L	PCT
East Division
No. 3 Florida ^{x}‍†‍‍^{y}	20	–	10	.667	49	–	21	.700
No. 20 Georgia ‍‍‍^{y}	18	–	12	.600	39	–	21	.650
No. 12 South Carolina ‍‍‍^{y}	17	–	13	.567	37	–	26	.587
No. 16 Vanderbilt ‍‍‍^{y}	16	–	14	.533	35	–	27	.565
Kentucky ‍‍‍	13	–	17	.433	34	–	22	.607
Missouri ‍‍‍	12	–	18	.400	34	–	22	.607
Tennessee ‍‍‍	12	–	18	.400	29	–	27	.518
West Division
No. 19 Ole Miss ^{x}‍‍‡‍^{y}	18	–	12	.600	48	–	18	.727
No. 2 Arkansas ^{x}‍‍‍^{y}	18	–	12	.600	48	–	21	.696
No. 15 Auburn ‍‍‍^{y}	15	–	15	.500	43	–	23	.652
LSU ‍‍‍^{y}	15	–	15	.500	39	–	27	.591
No. 4 Mississippi State ‍‍‍^{y}	15	–	15	.500	39	–	29	.574
Texas A&M ‍‍‍^{y}	13	–	17	.433	40	–	22	.645
Alabama ‍‍‍	8	–	22	.267	27	–	29	.482
x – Division champion † – Conference champion ‡ – Tournament champion y – Invited to the NCAA tournament Rankings from Collegiate Baseball

The 2018 LSU Tigers baseball team represented Louisiana State University (LSU) during the 2018 NCAA Division I baseball season. The Tigers played their home games at Alex Box Stadium as a member of the Southeastern Conference. They were led by head coach Paul Mainieri, in his 12th season at LSU.

== Previous season ==
In 2017, the Tigers won the SEC's Western Division with a record of 52–20–0, 21–9–0 in conference play. They qualified for the 2017 Southeastern Conference baseball tournament and defeated Arkansas in the final, 4–2. They qualified for the 2017 NCAA Division I baseball tournament as the SEC champion, and were selected as the No. 4 overall national seed. The Tigers were selected as hosts of the Baton Rouge regional, which included Rice, Southeastern Louisiana, and Texas Southern. The Tigers swept through the Regional, defeating Texas Southern, 15–7, Southeastern 11–6, and Rice 5–0 advancing to the Super Regional where they hosted conference rival Mississippi State. After a 4–3 comeback victory in which they trailed 3–0 in the bottom of the eighth inning, LSU beat the Bulldogs 14–4 the following night to advance to their 18th World Series. The Tigers defeated Florida State in their opening game 5–4, but then fell to overall number one seed Oregon State 13–1 placing them on the brink of elimination. The Tigers once again beat Florida State 7–4 to earn the right to face Oregon State once again, needing to win twice. LSU advanced to the finals winning 3–1 then 6–1 eliminating the Beavers. In the championship, LSU faced conference rival Florida. The Tigers lost a close Game 1 4–3 then were defeated 6–1 the following night to finish national runners-up, while the Gators earned their first national championship.

== Personnel ==
=== Roster ===
2018 LSU Tigers roster
Pitchers: 10 – Eric Walker – Sophomore; 18 – Austin Bain – Senior; 21 – Nick Storz – Freshman; 26 – AJ Labas – Freshman; 27 – Matthew Beck – Sophomore; 28 – Devin Fontenot – Freshman; 29 – Nick Bush – Sophomore; 30 – Trent Vietmeier – Freshman; 32 – Taylor Petersen – Junior; 35 – Clay Moffitt – Junior; 37 – Will Reese – Sophomore; 38 – Zach Hess – Sophomore; 40 – John Kodros – Freshman; 41 – Caleb Gilbert – Junior; 43 – Todd Peterson – Sophomore; 47 – Brandon Nowak – Junior; 49 – Cam Sanders – Junior; 52 – Ma'Khail Hilliard – Freshman	Catchers: 7 – Hunter Feduccia – Junior; 20 – Braden Doughty – Freshman; Infielders: 3 – Hal Hughes – Freshman; 4 – Josh Smith – Sophomore; 5 – Jake Slaughter – Sophomore; 13 – Nick Coomes – Senior; 16 – Brandt Broussard – Junior; 17 – Chris Reid – Junior; 25 – Bryce Jordan – Junior	Outfielders: 2 – Daniel Cabrera – Freshman; 8 – Antoine Duplantis – Junior; 9 – Zach Watson – Sophomore; 23 – Nick Webre – Freshman; 24 – Beau Jordan – Senior

=== Coaching staff ===
Name	Position	Seasons at LSU	Alma mater
Paul Mainieri	Head coach	12	Florida International University (1980)
Alan Dunn	Associate head coach	7	University of Alabama at Birmingham (1991)
Nolan Cain	Assistant coach/recruiting coordinator	5	Louisiana State University (2009)
Micah Gibbs	Director of player development	3	Louisiana State University (2010)
Sean Ochinko	Volunteer Coach/Hitting Coach	1	Louisiana State University (2017)
Travis Roy	Strength and conditioning coordinator	3	Louisiana State University (2012)
Nate Fury	Strength and conditioning coordinator	2	Louisiana State University (2014)
Leon Landry	Undergraduate Assistant Coach	1	Louisiana State University (2010)
Jamie Tutko	Video coordinator	2	Saint Leo University (2011)

== Schedule ==
Legend
	LSU win
	LSU loss
**Bold**	LSU team member

2018 LSU Tigers Game Log
Regular season (33–23)

February (5–4)
Date	Opponent	Rank	Stadium Site	Score	Win	Loss	Save	Attendance	Overall Record	SEC Record
February 16	Notre Dame	No. 10	Alex Box Stadium; Baton Rouge, LA	7–6	**Bain** (1–0)	Vierling (0–1)	None	12,844	1–0	–
February 17	Notre Dame	No. 10	Alex Box Stadium	5–10	Sheehan (1–0)	**Hess** (0–1)	Kmet (1)	12,223	1–1	–
February 18	Notre Dame	No. 10	Alex Box Stadium	3–11	Boyle (1–0)	**Peterson** (0–1)	Belcik (1)	10,384	1–2	–
February 21	New Orleans	No. 15	Alex Box Stadium	14–6	**Hilliard** (1–0)	Griffin (0–1)	None	10,154	2–2	–
February 23	No. 19 Texas	No. 15	Alex Box Stadium	13–4	**Hess** (1–1)	Kingham (1–1)	None	11,102	3–2	–
February 24	No. 19 Texas	No. 15	Alex Box Stadium	10–5	**Beck** (1–0)	Elder (1–1)	None	12,038	4–2	–
February 25	No. 19 Texas	No. 15	Alex Box Stadium	1–11	Henley (1–0)	**Peterson** (0–2)	None	10,762	4–3	–
February 27	Grambling State	No. 14	Alex Box Stadium	10–3	**Hilliard** (2–0)	Escano (0–1)	None	10,262	5–3	–
February 28	at Southeastern LA	No. 14	Pat Kenelly Diamond; Hammond, LA	4–5	Koestler (2–0)	**Peterson** (0–3)	Tassin (2)	3,101	5–4	–

March (13–7)
Date	Opponent	Rank	Stadium Site	Score	Win	Loss	Save	Attendance	Overall Record	SEC Record
March 2	Toledo	No. 14	Alex Box Stadium	8–1	**Hess** (2–1)	Jacob (0–2)	None	10,346	6–4	–
March 3	Sacred Heart	No. 14	Alex Box Stadium	7–0	**Gilbert** (1–0)	Taubl (0–2)	None	11,007	7–4	–
March 4	Southeastern LA	No. 14	Alex Box Stadium	4–2	**Hilliard** (3–0)	Granier (1–1)	**Bain** (1)	10,990	8–4	–
March 6	Southern	No. 13	Alex Box Stadium	8–2	**Sanders** (1–0)	Snyder (1–2)	**Peterson** (1)	9,924	9–4	–
March 7	at Louisiana	No. 13	M. L. Tigue Moore Field; Lafayette, LA	3–4^{10}	Stoelke (1–0)	**Bain** (0–1)	None	5,499	9–5	–
March 9	Hawaii	No. 13	Alex Box Stadium	2–4	Rees (2–0)	**Hess** (2–2)	Thomas (5)	10,686	9–6	–
March 10	Hawaii	No. 13	Alex Box Stadium	5–1	**Gilbert** (2–0)	DeMiero (1–1)	None	10,866	10–6	–
March 11	Hawaii	No. 13	Alex Box Stadium	14–1	**Hilliard** (4–0)	Pouelsen (2–1)	None	10,334	11–6	–
March 14	South Alabama	No. 16	Alex Box Stadium	9–4	**Labas** (1–0)	Yarborough (1–1)	None	10,456	12–6	–
March 16	No. 24 Missouri	No. 16	Alex Box Stadium	4–2	**Hess** (3–2)	Montes (3–1)	**Bain** (2)	10,334	13–6	1–0
March 17	No. 24 Missouri	No. 16	Alex Box Stadium	6–12	Plassmeyer (3–0)	**Gilbert** (2–1)	None	10,747	13–7	1–1
March 18	No. 24 Missouri	No. 16	Alex Box Stadium	7–5	**Hilliard** (5–0)	Toelken (2–2)	None	10,141	14–7	2–1
March 21	Tulane	No. 15	Alex Box Stadium	10–4	**Labas** (2–0)	Solesky (1–2)	None	10,319	15–7	–
March 23	at No. 5 Vanderbilt	No. 15	Hawkins Field; Nashville, TN	2–4	Fellows (4–0)	**Hess** (3–3)	King (2)	3,136	15–8	2–2
March 24	at No. 5 Vanderbilt	No. 15	Hawkins Field	6–2^{^{[a]}}	**Gilbert** (3–1)	Raby (2–3)	None	3,211	16–8	3–2
March 25	at No. 5 Vanderbilt	No. 15	Hawkins Field	0–1^{7}	Hickman (5–0)	**Hilliard** (4–1)	None	3,399	16–9	3–3
March 27	vs.Louisiana	No. 19	Shrine on Airline; Metairie, LA	1–3	Harris (1–1)	**Labas** (2–1)	Stoelke (6)	8,732	16–10	–
March 29	Mississippi State	No. 19	Alex Box Stadium	10–1	**Hess** (4–3)	Pilkington (1–4)	None	10,532	17–10	4–3
March 30	Mississippi State	No. 19	Alex Box Stadium	1–4	Small (2–2)	**Gilbert** (3–2)	Gordon (2)	11,132	17–11	4–4
March 31	Mississippi State	No. 19	Alex Box Stadium	4–0	**Hilliard** (6–1)	Billingsley (2–2)	**Bush** (1)	11,133	18–11	5–4
^{^[a]}The game was suspended during the eighth inning due to rain and continued at 10:00 a.m. on March 25 prior to the start of the game scheduled for that day.

April (8–8)
Date	Opponent	Rank	Stadium Site	Score	Win	Loss	Save	Attendance	Overall Record	SEC Record
April 3	Nicholls State	No. 21	Alex Box Stadium	10–1	**Labas** (3–1)	Taylor (2–4)	None	11,258	19–11	–
April 5	at Texas A&M	No. 21	Olsen Field; College Station, TX	4–1	**Hess** (5–3)	Kolek (3–4)	None	4,818	20–11	6–4
April 6	at Texas A&M	No. 21	Olsen Field	2–9	Doxakis (5–1)	**Gilbert** (3–3)	None	5,761	20–12	6–5
April 7	at Texas A&M	No. 21	Olsen Field	1–3	Kilkenny (7–0)	**Hilliard** (6–2)	None	6,288	20–13	6–6
April 10	Louisiana Tech	No. 23	Alex Box Stadium	2–0	**Labas** (4–1)	Leal (2–2)	**Bain** (3)	10,647	21–13	–
April 13	Tennessee	No. 23	Alex Box Stadium	9–3	**Hess** (6–3)	Crochet (2–5)	None	10,848	22–13	7–6
April 14	Tennessee	No. 23	Alex Box Stadium	14–5	**Hilliard** (7–2)	Stallings (4–3)	**Gilbert** (1)	10,578	23–13	8–6
April 15	Tennessee	No. 23	Alex Box Stadium	9–7	**Petersen** (1–0)	Linginfelter (2–4)	None	10,451	24–13	9–6
April 18	at Tulane	No. 18	Turchin Stadium; New Orleans, LA	9–10	Johnson (2–2)	**Beck** (1–1)	None	5,000	24–14	–
April 20	at South Carolina	No. 18	Founders Park; Columbia, SC	0–11	Chapman (3–0)	**Hess** (6–4)	None	6,952	24–15	9–7
April 21	at South Carolina	No. 18	Founders Park	4–11	Hill (4–4)	**Hilliard** (7–3)	None	7,982	24–16	9–8
April 22	at South Carolina	No. 18	Founders Park	6–8	Demurias (4–0)	**Bain** (1–2)	Bridges (2)	7,141	24–17	9–9
April 24	Lamar		Alex Box Stadium	8–0	**Labas** (1–1)	Campbell (1–7)	None	10,027	25–17	–
April 26	at No. 8 Ole Miss		Swayze Field; Oxford, MS	3–14	Rolison (6–3)	**Kodros** (0–1)	None	8,062	25–18	9–10
April 27	at No. 8 Ole Miss		Swayze Field	5–2	**Hilliard** (8–3)	Feigl (7–3)	None	11,861	26–18	10–10
April 28	at No. 8 Ole Miss		Swayze Field	8–9	Ethridge (2–1)	**Gilbert** (3–4)	Caracci (8)	12,152	26–19	10–11

May (7–4)
Date	Opponent	Rank	Stadium Site	Score	Win	Loss	Save	Attendance	Overall Record	SEC Record
May 4	No. 6 Arkansas		Alex Box Stadium	4–5	Loseke (2–1)	**Bush** (0–1)	Reindl (5)	10,776	26–20	10–12
May 5	No. 6 Arkansas		Alex Box Stadium	6–4	**Fontenot** (1–0)	Murphy (5–4)	**Peterson** (2)	10,948	27–20	11–12
May 6	No. 6 Arkansas		Alex Box Stadium	7–5	**Labas** (6–1)	Campbell (3–5)	**Beck** (1)	10,932	28–20	12–12
May 9	McNeese State		Alex Box Stadium	13–3^{7}	**Vietmeier** (1–0)	Wesley (3–4)	None	10,436	29–20	–
May 11	Alabama		Alex Box Stadium	7–5	**Kodros** (1–1)	Medders (0–4)	**Peterson** (3)	10,685	30–20	13–12
May 12	Alabama		Alex Box Stadium	1–6	Walters (3–5)	**Hilliard** (8–4)	None	11,153	30–21	13–13
May 13	Alabama		Alex Box Stadium	7–3	**Bush** (1–1)	Rukes (1–3)	None	10,758	31–21	14–13
May 15	Northwestern State	No. 28	Alex Box Stadium	9–5	**Beck** (2–1)	Pigott (1–1)	**Bain** (4)	10,872	32–21	–
May 17	at Auburn	No. 28	Plainsman Park; Auburn, AL	4–11	Tanner (5–4)	**Hess** (6–5)	Greenhill (5)	2,988	32–22	14–14
May 18	at Auburn	No. 28	Plainsman Park	6–2	**Hilliard** (9–4)	Mize (9–4)	**Peterson** (4)	3,746	33–22	15–14
May 19	at Auburn	No. 28	Plainsman Park	5–14	Mitchell (2–1)	**Labas** (6–2)	None	3,568	33–23	15–15

Postseason (6–4)

SEC Tournament
Date	Opponent	Rank	Stadium Site	Score	Win	Loss	Save	Attendance	Overall record	SECT Record
May 22	vs. (9) Mississippi State	(8)	Metropolitan Stadium; Hoover, AL	8–5	**Fontenot** (2–0)	France (4–4)	**Peterson** (5)	8,072	34–23	1–0
May 23	vs. No. 2 (1) Florida	(8)	Metropolitan Stadium	3–4	Mace (4–0)	**Hilliard** (9–5)	Byrne (13)	6,710	34–24	1–1
May 24	vs. No. 14 (5) South Carolina	(8)	Metropolitan Stadium	6–4^{12}	**Peterson** (1–3)	Gilreath (0–1)	None	7,197	35–24	2–1
May 25^{[a]}	vs. No. 2 (1) Florida	(8)	Metropolitan Stadium	11–0^{7}	**Beck** (3–1)	Leftwich (4–5)	None	8,945	36–24	3–1
May 26	vs. No. 9 (4) Arkansas	(8)	Metropolitan Stadium	2–1	**Hess** (7–5)	Campbell (4–6)	**Bush** (2)	10,381	37–24	4–1
May 27	vs. No. 7 (2) Ole Miss	(8)	Metropolitan Stadium	1–9	Rolison (9–4)	**Gilbert** (3–5)	None	14,126	37–25	4–2
^{^[a]}The game was suspended during the sixth inning due to heavy fog and continued at 11:00 a.m. on May 26 prior to the start of the session scheduled for that day.

NCAA tournament: Corvallis Regional
Date	Opponent	Rank	Stadium Site	Score	Win	Loss	Save	Attendance	Overall record	Regional Record
June 1	vs. (3) San Diego State	(2)	Goss Stadium; Corvallis, OR	6–4	**Fontenot** (3–0)	Erickson (5–4)	**Peterson** (6)	3,589	38–25	1–0
June 2	at No. 1 (1) Oregon State	(2)	Goss Stadium	1–14	Heimlich (15–1)	**Hess** (7–6)	None	4,009	38–26	1–1
June 3 (1)	vs. (4) Northwestern State	(2)	Goss Stadium	9–5	**Beck** (4–1)	Vasquez (6–2)	None	3,533	39–26	2–1
June 3 (2)	at No. 1 (1) Oregon State	(2)	Goss Stadium	0–12	Abel (4–1)	**Fontenot** (3–1)	None	3,915	39–27	2–2

All rankings from Collegiate Baseball.

== Record vs. conference opponents ==
Last two do not qualify for conf. tourn. Blank are not scheduled. Blue are home games, otherwise away.

2018 SEC baseball records Source: 2018 SEC baseball game results
Team	W–L	ALA	ARK	AUB	FLA	UGA	KEN	LSU	MSU	MIZZ	MISS	SCAR	TENN	TAMU	VAN	Team	Div	SR	SW
ALA	8–22		0–3	0–3	.	1–2	2–1	1–2	1–2	2–1	1–2	.	0–3	0–3	.	ALA	W7	2–8	0–4
ARK	18–12	3–0		3–0	1–2	1–2	3–0	1–2	0–3	.	1–2	2–1	.	3–0	.	ARK	W2	5–5	4–1
AUB	15–15	3–0	0–3		1–2	.	1–2	2–1	2–1	1–2	0–3	.	.	2–1	3–0	AUB	W3	5–5	2–2
FLA	20–10	.	2–1	2–1		2–1	2–1	.	0–3	3–0	.	2–1	2–1	2–1	3–0	FLA	E1	9–1	2–1
UGA	18–12	2–1	2–1	.	1–2		1–2	.	.	3–0	1–2	3–0	2–1	2–1	1–2	UGA	E2	6–4	2–0
KEN	13–17	1–2	0–3	2–1	1–2	2–1		.	2–1	2–1	.	2–1	1–2	.	0–3	KEN	E5	5–5	0–2
LSU	15–15	2–1	2–1	1–2	.	.	.		2–1	2–1	1–2	0–3	3–0	1–2	1–2	LSU	W4	5–5	1–1
MSU	15–15	2–1	3–0	1–2	3–0	.	1–2	1–2		1–2	2–1	.	.	1–2	0–3	MSU	W5	4–6	2–1
MIZZ	12–18	1–2	.	2–1	0–3	0–3	1–2	1–2	2–1		.	1–2	2–1	.	2–1	MIZZ	E6	4–6	0–2
MISS	18–12	2–1	2–1	3–0	.	2–1	.	2–1	1–2	.		1–2	2–1	2–1	1–2	MISS	W1	7–3	1–0
SCAR	17–13	.	1–2	.	1–2	0–3	1–2	3–0	.	2–1	2–1		3–0	2–1	2–1	SCAR	E3	6–4	2–1
TENN	12–18	3–0	.	.	1–2	1–2	2–1	0–3	.	1–2	1–2	0–3		2–1	1–2	TENN	E7	3–7	1–2
TAMU	13–17	3–0	0–3	1–2	1–2	1–2	.	2–1	2–1	.	1–2	1–2	1–2		.	TAMU	W6	3–7	1–1
VAN	16–14	.	.	0–3	0–3	2–1	3–0	2–1	3–0	1–2	2–1	1–2	2–1	.		VAN	E4	6–4	2–2
Team	W–L	ALA	ARK	AUB	FLA	UGA	KEN	LSU	MSU	MIZZ	MISS	SCAR	TENN	TAMU	VAN	Team	Div	SR	SW

Updated for entire regular season.

== Rankings ==
Ranking movements Legend: ██ Increase in ranking ██ Decrease in ranking — = Not ranked RV = Received votes
	Week																		
Poll	Pre	1	2	3	4	5	6	7	8	9	10	11	12	13	14	15	16	17	Final
Coaches'	9	9*	9*	18	19	20	21	20	24	21	RV	—	RV	RV	—	RV			
Baseball America	17	22	16	16	17	18	21	17	19	18	—	—	—	—	—	—			
Collegiate Baseball^	10	15	14	13	16	15	19	21	23	18	—	—	—	28	—	—			
NCBWA†	11	21	18	19	19	20	21	20	22	19	RV	RV	RV	RV	—	RV			

^ Collegiate Baseball ranked 40 teams in their preseason poll, but only ranked 30 teams weekly during the season.
† NCBWA ranks 30 teams in their preseason poll, but only ranks 25 teams weekly during the season.
* A new poll was not released for this week, so for comparison purposes, the previous week's ranking is inserted in this week's slot.
