= 2018 Tennessee Volunteers baseball team =

American college baseball season

2018 Tennessee Volunteers baseball
- Conference: Southeastern Conference
- Record: 29–27 (12–18 SEC)
- Head coach: Tony Vitello (1st season)
- Home stadium: Lindsey Nelson Stadium

2018 Southeastern Conference baseball standings
	Conf.				Overall
Team	W		L	PCT	W		L	PCT
East Division
No. 3 Florida ^{x}‍†‍‍^{y}	20	–	10	.667	49	–	21	.700
No. 20 Georgia ‍‍‍^{y}	18	–	12	.600	39	–	21	.650
No. 12 South Carolina ‍‍‍^{y}	17	–	13	.567	37	–	26	.587
No. 16 Vanderbilt ‍‍‍^{y}	16	–	14	.533	35	–	27	.565
Kentucky ‍‍‍	13	–	17	.433	34	–	22	.607
Missouri ‍‍‍	12	–	18	.400	34	–	22	.607
Tennessee ‍‍‍	12	–	18	.400	29	–	27	.518
West Division
No. 19 Ole Miss ^{x}‍‍‡‍^{y}	18	–	12	.600	48	–	18	.727
No. 2 Arkansas ^{x}‍‍‍^{y}	18	–	12	.600	48	–	21	.696
No. 15 Auburn ‍‍‍^{y}	15	–	15	.500	43	–	23	.652
LSU ‍‍‍^{y}	15	–	15	.500	39	–	27	.591
No. 4 Mississippi State ‍‍‍^{y}	15	–	15	.500	39	–	29	.574
Texas A&M ‍‍‍^{y}	13	–	17	.433	40	–	22	.645
Alabama ‍‍‍	8	–	22	.267	27	–	29	.482
x – Division champion † – Conference champion ‡ – Tournament champion y – Invited to the NCAA tournament Rankings from Collegiate Baseball

The 2018 Tennessee Volunteers baseball team represented the University of Tennessee in the 2018 NCAA Division I baseball season. The Volunteers played their home games at Lindsey Nelson Stadium. The team was coached by Tony Vitello in his first season as head coach at Tennessee.

== Roster ==
2018 Tennessee Volunteers active roster
Pitchers: 11 – LHP – Will Heflin – Sophomore – Morristown, TN; 15 – RHP – Will Neely – Junior – Knoxville, TN; 17 – RHP – Connor Darling – Sophomore – Suwanee, GA; 18 – RHP – Chase Wallace – Freshman – Sevierville, TN; 20 – RHP – Donovan Benoit – Freshman – Pensacola, FL; 23 – RHP – Riley Watkins – Freshman – Eads, TN; 25 – RHP – Zach Linginfelter – Sophomore – Sevierville, TN; 27 – RHP – Garrett Stallings – Sophomore – Chesapeake, VA; 28 – RHP – Alex Harper-Cook – (redshirt) Sophomore – Maryville, TN; 29 – RHP – Daniel Vasquez – Junior – El Cajon, CA; 30 – RHP – Andrew Schultz – Sophomore – Alpharetta, GA; 32 – RHP – Sean Hunley – Freshman – Mount Juliet, TN; 33 – RHP – Joshua Plummer – Freshman – Mechanicsville, VA; 34 – LHP – Garrett Crochet – Freshman – Ocean Springs, MS; 37 – RHP – Richard Jackson – (redshirt) Junior – Atlanta, GA; 41 – LHP – Sam Springer – Freshman – Knoxville, TN; 46 – LHP – Redmond Walsh – (redshirt) Freshman – Louisville, TN	Catchers: 6 – Evan Russell – Freshman – Lexington, TN; 31 – Benito Santiago – Senior – Pembroke Pines, FL; 35 – Nico Mascia – (redshirt) Sophomore – Knoxville, TN; Infielders: 2 – Alex Sosnowski – (redshirt) Freshman – Orange, CA; 4 – Jay Charleston – Sophomore – Longwood, FL; 8 – Brandon Chinea – Sophomore – Miami, FL; 12 – Wyatt Stapp – Freshman – Keller, TX; 13 – Andre Lipcius – Sophomore – Williamsburg, VA; 14 – Nick Woods – Freshman – Chattanooga, TN; 26 – Brandon Trammell – Freshman – Knoxville, TN; 42 – Reed Fell – Junior – Springdale, AR; Outfielders: 1 – Brodie Leftridge – Senior – Baltimore, MD; 5 – Zach Daniels – Freshman – Stockbridge, GA; 7 – Cal Gobbell – (redshirt) Freshman – Savannah, TN; 9 – Justin Ammons – Sophomore – Memphis, TN; 19 – Gunnar Ricketts – Freshman – Chattanooga, TN; 21 – Eric Gilliam – Freshman – Lexington, TN; 40 – Luc Lipcius – Sophomore – Williamsburg, VA; Utility: 10 – Pete Derkay – Sophomore – Acworth, GA	Coaches: Tony Vitello – Head Coach (1st year); Frank Anderson – Assistant Coach; Josh Elander – Assistant Coach/Recruiting Coordinator; Todd Helton – Director of Player Development

== Schedule ==
2018 Tennessee Volunteers baseball game log
Regular Season

February
Date	Opponent	Stadium Site	Score	Win	Loss	Save	Attendance	Overall Record	SEC Record
February 16	Maryland	Lindsey Nelson Stadium; Knoxville, TN	0–4	Bloom (1–0)	**Lingenfelter** (0–1)	None	1,312	0–1	–
February 17	Maryland	Lindsey Nelson Stadium	Postponed (inclement weather) Makeup: February 18 as a single-admission doubleheader						
February 18 (1)	Maryland	Lindsey Nelson Stadium	4–10	Fisher (1–0)	**Darling** (0–1)	None	2,330	0–2	–
February 18 (2)	Maryland	Lindsey Nelson Stadium	13–6	**Neely** (1–0)	Alexander (0–1)	**Benoit** (1)	2,330	1–2	–
February 20	Lipscomb	Lindsey Nelson Stadium	8–5	**Crochet** (1–0)	Tripp (0–1)	**Vasquez** (1)	1,393	2–2	–
February 23	UNC Greensboro	Lindsey Nelson Stadium	3–2	**Heflin** (1–0)	Maynard (0–1)	**Wallace** (1)	1,286	3–2	–
February 24	UNC Greensboro	Lindsey Nelson Stadium	11–4	**Stallings** (1–0)	Hensley (0–1)	None	1,383	4–2	–
February 25	UNC Greensboro	Lindsey Nelson Stadium	2–3	Maynard (1–1)	**Crochet** (1–1)	Wantz (1)	1,110	4–3	–
February 27	Middle Tennessee State	Lindsey Nelson Stadium	5–4	**Heflin** (2–0)	Williams (0–1)	**Wallace** (2)	1,277	5–3	–
February 28	Arkansas–Pine Bluff	Lindsey Nelson Stadium	9–1	**Hunley** (1–0)	O'Guinn (0–2)	None	968	6–3	–

March
Date	Opponent	Stadium Site	Score	Win	Loss	Save	Attendance	Overall Record	SEC Record
March 2	East Tennessee State	Lindsey Nelson Stadium	9–10	Bates (1–0)	**Wallace** (0–1)	Maher (3)	1,266	6–4	–
March 3	Memphis	Lindsey Nelson Stadium	2–1	**Stallings** (2–0)	Bowlan (0–3)	None	1,329	7–4	–
March 4	Middle Tennessee State	Lindsey Nelson Stadium	5–7^{12}	Dennis (1–0)	**Crochet** (1–2)	None	1,495	7–5	–
March 6	James Madison	Lindsey Nelson Stadium	10–1	**Hunley** (2–0)	Bourne (0–1)	None	1,117	8–5	–
March 7	James Madison	Lindsey Nelson Stadium	2–21	Kelly (1–1)	**Schultz** (0–1)	None	1,064	8–6	–
March 9	at Cincinnati	Marge Schott Stadium; Cincinnati, OH	3–2^{12}	**Lingenfelter** (1–1)	Lowe II (0–1)	None	467	9–6	–
March 10	at Cincinnati	Marge Schott Stadium	7–5	**Stallings** (3–0)	Alldred (0–1)	**Linginfelter** (1)	816	10–6	–
March 11	at Cincinnati	Marge Schott Stadium	2–1	**Neely** (2–0)	Orndorff (0–2)	None	661	11–6	–
March 14	Western Carolina	Lindsey Nelson Stadium	5–0	**Hunley** (3–0)	Bishop (0–2)	None	1,096	12–6	–
March 16	at No. 8 Ole Miss	Swayze Field; Oxford, MS	8–6	**Crochet** (2–2)	Rolison (3–2)	**Linginfelter** (2)	7,277	13–6	1–0
March 17	at No. 8 Ole Miss	Swayze Field	1–7	Feigl (5–0)	**Stallings** (3–1)	None	8,875	13–7	1–1
March 18	at No. 8 Ole Miss	Swayze Field	0–5	McArthur (3–0)	**Neely** (2–1)	Caracci (1)	7,560	13–8	1–2
March 20	East Tennessee State	Lindsey Nelson Stadium	6–9	Giambalvo (2–0)	**Heflin** (2–1)	Korzybski (1)	1,148	13–9	–
March 23	Alabama	Lindsey Nelson Stadium	5–4	**Linginfelter** (2–1)	Medders (0–1)	None	1,874	14–9	2–2
March 24	Alabama	Lindsey Nelson Stadium	Postponed (inclement weather) Makeup: March 25 as a single-admission, 7-inning doubleheader						
March 25 (1)	Alabama	Lindsey Nelson Stadium	2–1^{7}	**Stallings** (4–1)	Walters (2–3)	None	2,299	15–9	3–2
March 25 (2)	Alabama	Lindsey Nelson Stadium	3–0^{7}	**Neely** (3–1)	Rukes (1–1)	None	2,299	16–9	4–2
March 27	at Western Carolina	Hennon Stadium; Cullowhee, NC	17–3	**Hunley** (4–0)	Bishop (0–3)	None	572	17–9	–
March 29	at South Carolina	Founders Park; Columbia, SC	1–6	Hill (3–2)	**Crochet** (2–3)	None	6,425	17–10	4–3
March 30	at South Carolina	Founders Park	2–6	Morris (5–2)	**Stallings** (4–2)	None	6,945	17–11	4–4
March 31	at South Carolina	Founders Park	3–6	Demurias (3–0)	**Linginfelter** (2–2)	None	7,816	17–12	4–5

April
Date	Opponent	Stadium Site	Score	Win	Loss	Save	Attendance	Overall Record	SEC Record
April 3	Belmont	Lindsey Nelson Stadium	9–2	**Hunley** (5–0)	Fowlkes (0–5)	None	1,691	18–12	–
April 6	No. 1 Florida	Lindsey Nelson Stadium	Postponed (inclement weather) Makeup: April 8 as a single-admission, 7-inning doubleheader						
April 7	No. 1 Florida	Lindsey Nelson Stadium	6–22	Singer (7–1)	**Crochet** (2–4)	None	1,819	18–13	4–6
April 8 (1)	No. 1 Florida	Lindsey Nelson Stadium	4–6^{11}	Butler (3–1)	**Lingenfelter** (2–3)	None	2,639	18–14	4–7
April 8 (2)	No. 1 Florida	Lindsey Nelson Stadium	6–4^{7}	**Neely** (4–1)	Dyson (4–2)	None	2,639	19–14	5–7
April 10	UT Martin	Lindsey Nelson Stadium	9–0	**Hunley** (6–0)	Cain (0–4)	None	1,317	20–14	–
April 11	UT Martin	Lindsey Nelson Stadium	15–1	**Heflin** (3–1)	Westfall (0–3)	None	1,182	21–14	–
April 13	at No. 19 LSU	Alex Box Stadium; Baton Rouge, LA	3–9	Hess (6–3)	**Crochet** (2–5)	None	10,848	21–15	5–8
April 14	at No. 19 LSU	Alex Box Stadium	5–14	Hilliard (7–2)	**Stallings** (4–3)	Gilbert (1)	10,578	21–16	5–9
April 15	at No. 19 LSU	Alex Box Stadium	7–9	Petersen (1–0)	**Lingenfelter** (2–4)	None	10,451	21–17	5–10
April 17	East Tennessee State	Lindsey Nelson Stadium	6–2	**Heflin** (4–1)	Sweeney (1–1)	None	1,703	22–17	–
April 20	No. 14 Texas A&M	Lindsey Nelson Stadium	7–4	**Wallace** (1–1)	Kilkenny (8–1)	None	2,307	23–17	6–10
April 21	No. 14 Texas A&M	Lindsey Nelson Stadium	3–8	Doxakis (6–1)	**Stallings** (4–4)	None	2,946	23–18	6–11
April 22	No. 14 Texas A&M	Lindsey Nelson Stadium	6–4	**Crochet** (3–5)	Sherrod (4–2)	**Wallace** (3)	1,941	24–18	7–11
April 24	No. 21 Tennessee Tech	Lindsey Nelson Stadium	Postponed (inclement weather) Makeup: April 25						
April 25	No. 21 Tennessee Tech	Lindsey Nelson Stadium	6–7	Provey (3–0)	**Heflin** 4–2	Roberts (10)	1,301	24–19	–
April 27	at No. 20 Georgia	Foley Field; Athens, GA	6–8	Adkins (4–0)	**Schultz** (0–2)	Kristofak (3)	2,513	24–20	7–12
April 28	at No. 20 Georgia	Foley Field	4–12	Hancock (5–3)	**Stallings** (4–5)	None	3,201	24–21	7–13
April 29	at No. 20 Georgia	Foley Field	6–5^{10}	**Crochet** (4–5)	Schunk (1–1)	None	2,620	25–21	8–13

May
Date	Opponent	Stadium Site	Score	Win	Loss	Save	Attendance	Overall Record	SEC Record
May 1	Morehead State	Lindsey Nelson Stadium	2–4	Rogers (1–1)	**Hunley** (6–1)	Conway (3)	1,407	25–22	–
May 4	No. 13 Kentucky	Lindsey Nelson Stadium	6–2	**Lingenfelter** (3–4)	Hjelle (6–4)	**Crochet** (1)	2,080	26–22	9–13
May 5	No. 13 Kentucky	Lindsey Nelson Stadium	3–10	Haake (2–4)	**Hunley** (6–2)	None	1,912	26–23	9–14
May 6	No. 13 Kentucky	Lindsey Nelson Stadium	5–3	**Crochet** (5–5)	Lewis (7–3)	**Stallings** (1)	2,324	27–23	10–14
May 11	Vanderbilt	Lindsey Nelson Stadium	6–7	Fellows (5–4)	**Heflin** (4–3)	Day (1)	2,309	27–24	10–15
May 12	Vanderbilt	Lindsey Nelson Stadium	2–7	Raby (4–5)	**Hunley** (6–3)	None	2,245	27–25	10–16
May 13	Vanderbilt	Lindsey Nelson Stadium	8–7	**Stallings** (5–5)	Gillis (3–1)	None	1,521	28–25	11–16
May 17	at Missouri	Taylor Stadium; Columbia, MO	2–3^{12}	Pferrer (1–0)	**Crochet** (5–6)	None	906	28–26	11–17
May 18	at Missouri	Taylor Stadium	2–1	**Hunley** (7–3)	Plassmeyer (5–4)	**Stallings** (2)	1,264	29–26	12–17
May 19	at Missouri	Taylor Stadium	3–8	Ball (2–1)	**Neely** (4–2)	None	1,176	29–27	12–18

Legend: = Win = Loss = Postponed
Bold = Tennessee team member

== Record vs. conference opponents ==
Last two do not qualify for conf. tourn. Blank are not scheduled. Blue are home games, otherwise away.

2018 SEC baseball records Source: 2018 SEC baseball game results
Team	W–L	ALA	ARK	AUB	FLA	UGA	KEN	LSU	MSU	MIZZ	MISS	SCAR	TENN	TAMU	VAN	Team	Div	SR	SW
ALA	8–22		0–3	0–3	.	1–2	2–1	1–2	1–2	2–1	1–2	.	0–3	0–3	.	ALA	W7	2–8	0–4
ARK	18–12	3–0		3–0	1–2	1–2	3–0	1–2	0–3	.	1–2	2–1	.	3–0	.	ARK	W2	5–5	4–1
AUB	15–15	3–0	0–3		1–2	.	1–2	2–1	2–1	1–2	0–3	.	.	2–1	3–0	AUB	W3	5–5	2–2
FLA	20–10	.	2–1	2–1		2–1	2–1	.	0–3	3–0	.	2–1	2–1	2–1	3–0	FLA	E1	9–1	2–1
UGA	18–12	2–1	2–1	.	1–2		1–2	.	.	3–0	1–2	3–0	2–1	2–1	1–2	UGA	E2	6–4	2–0
KEN	13–17	1–2	0–3	2–1	1–2	2–1		.	2–1	2–1	.	2–1	1–2	.	0–3	KEN	E5	5–5	0–2
LSU	15–15	2–1	2–1	1–2	.	.	.		2–1	2–1	1–2	0–3	3–0	1–2	1–2	LSU	W4	5–5	1–1
MSU	15–15	2–1	3–0	1–2	3–0	.	1–2	1–2		1–2	2–1	.	.	1–2	0–3	MSU	W5	4–6	2–1
MIZZ	12–18	1–2	.	2–1	0–3	0–3	1–2	1–2	2–1		.	1–2	2–1	.	2–1	MIZZ	E6	4–6	0–2
MISS	18–12	2–1	2–1	3–0	.	2–1	.	2–1	1–2	.		1–2	2–1	2–1	1–2	MISS	W1	7–3	1–0
SCAR	17–13	.	1–2	.	1–2	0–3	1–2	3–0	.	2–1	2–1		3–0	2–1	2–1	SCAR	E3	6–4	2–1
TENN	12–18	3–0	.	.	1–2	1–2	2–1	0–3	.	1–2	1–2	0–3		2–1	1–2	TENN	E7	3–7	1–2
TAMU	13–17	3–0	0–3	1–2	1–2	1–2	.	2–1	2–1	.	1–2	1–2	1–2		.	TAMU	W6	3–7	1–1
VAN	16–14	.	.	0–3	0–3	2–1	3–0	2–1	3–0	1–2	2–1	1–2	2–1	.		VAN	E4	6–4	2–2
Team	W–L	ALA	ARK	AUB	FLA	UGA	KEN	LSU	MSU	MIZZ	MISS	SCAR	TENN	TAMU	VAN	Team	Div	SR	SW

Updated for entire regular season.
