= 2018 Alabama Crimson Tide baseball team =

Overview of 2018 performance by Alabama college baseball team

2018 Alabama Crimson Tide baseball
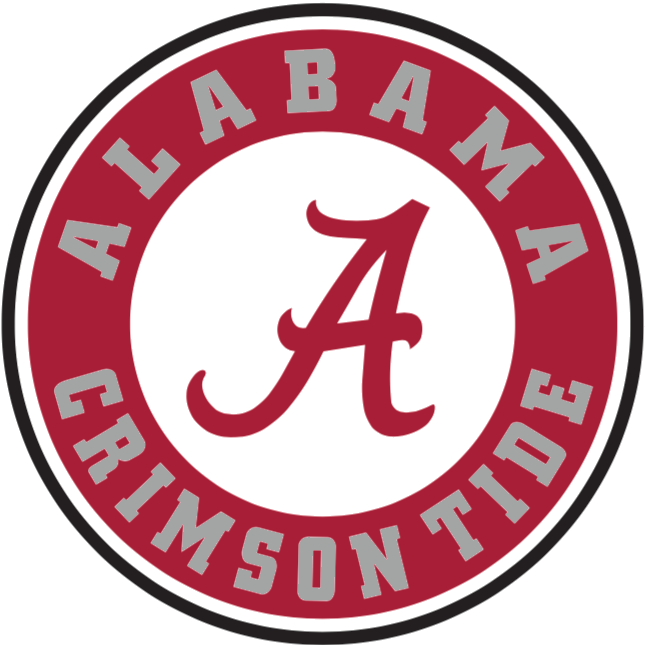
- Conference: Southeastern Conference
- West
- Record: 27–29 (8–22 SEC)
- Head coach: Brad Bohannon (1st season)
- Assistant coach: Brock Bennett
- Hitting coach: Jerry Zulli
- Pitching coach: Jason Jackson
- Home stadium: Sewell–Thomas Stadium

2018 Southeastern Conference baseball standings
	Conf.				Overall
Team	W		L	PCT	W		L	PCT
East Division
No. 3 Florida ^{x}‍†‍‍^{y}	20	–	10	.667	49	–	21	.700
No. 20 Georgia ‍‍‍^{y}	18	–	12	.600	39	–	21	.650
No. 12 South Carolina ‍‍‍^{y}	17	–	13	.567	37	–	26	.587
No. 16 Vanderbilt ‍‍‍^{y}	16	–	14	.533	35	–	27	.565
Kentucky ‍‍‍	13	–	17	.433	34	–	22	.607
Missouri ‍‍‍	12	–	18	.400	34	–	22	.607
Tennessee ‍‍‍	12	–	18	.400	29	–	27	.518
West Division
No. 19 Ole Miss ^{x}‍‍‡‍^{y}	18	–	12	.600	48	–	18	.727
No. 2 Arkansas ^{x}‍‍‍^{y}	18	–	12	.600	48	–	21	.696
No. 15 Auburn ‍‍‍^{y}	15	–	15	.500	43	–	23	.652
LSU ‍‍‍^{y}	15	–	15	.500	39	–	27	.591
No. 4 Mississippi State ‍‍‍^{y}	15	–	15	.500	39	–	29	.574
Texas A&M ‍‍‍^{y}	13	–	17	.433	40	–	22	.645
Alabama ‍‍‍	8	–	22	.267	27	–	29	.482
x – Division champion † – Conference champion ‡ – Tournament champion y – Invited to the NCAA tournament Rankings from Collegiate Baseball

The 2018 Alabama Crimson Tide baseball team represented the University of Alabama in the 2018 NCAA Division I baseball season. The Crimson Tide played their home games in the newly renovated Sewell–Thomas Stadium. This season was the first under head coach Brad Bohannon, following the firing of Greg Goff after one season.

== Personnel ==
=== Returning starters ===
Player	Class	Position
Hunter Alexander	Senior	1B/RF
Chandler Avant	Senior	2B
Dylan Duarte	Junior	SP
Cody Henry	Senior	DH/1B
Chandler Taylor	Junior	RF
Connor Short	Senior	3B
Davis Vainer	Sophomore	RHP
Cobie Vance	Junior	3B
Jake Walters	Senior	SP

=== Roster ===
2018 Alabama Crimson Tide roster
Pitchers: 12 Sonny Potter - Sophomore; 16 Jake Walters - Senior; 20 Brock Love - (redshirt) Sophomore; 21 Garret Rukes - (redshirt) Freshman; 23 Mason Duke - Junior; 24 Sam Gardner - Junior; 25 Dylan Duarte - Junior; 32 Deacon Medders - Sophomore; 33 Kyle Cameron - (redshirt) Sophomore; 35 Brady Greene - Freshman; 40 Brock Guffey - Freshman; 42 Tyler Adams - Senior; 44 Davis Vainer - (redshirt) Sophomore	Catchers: 19 Sam Praytor- Freshman; 28 Kyle Kaufman - Junior; 55 Matt Malkin - Junior; Infielders: 1 Cobie Vance - Junior; 2 John Trousdale - Sophomore; 5 Chandler Avant - Senior; 9 Cody Henry - Senior; 11 Connor Short - Senior; 22 Hunter Alexander - Senior; 26 Jett Manning - Junior; 34 Landan Sartain - Junior	Outfielders: 4 Joe Breaux - Junior; 7 Chandler Taylor - Junior; 13 Walker McCleney - Sophomore; 14 Gene Wood - Junior; 18 Keith Holcombe - Junior; Utility: 10 Sam Finnerty - Junior; 30 Connor Stutts - Sophomore

=== Coaching staff ===
2018 Alabama Crimson Tide baseball coaching staff
- Brad Bohannon – Head Coach (1st year)
- Josh Jackson – Assistant coach (1st year)
- Jerry Zulli – Assistant coach (1st year)
- Brock Bennett – Volunteer assistant coach (1st year)
- Jack Hoehl – Director of Operations (1st year)
- Garrett Walters – Bullpen Coach (2nd year)

== Schedule ==
Legend
	Alabama win
	Alabama loss
	Postponement
**Bold**	Alabama team member

2018 Alabama Crimson Tide baseball game log
Regular season
February (9–0)

Date	Opponent	Rank	Stadium Site	Score	Win	Loss	Save	Attendance	Overall Record	SEC Record
February 16	Valparaiso		Sewell–Thomas Stadium; Tuscaloosa, AL	16–2	**Finnerty** (1–0)	Tieman (0–1)	None	3,194	1–0	–
February 17	Valparaiso		Sewell–Thomas Stadium	6–5	**Duarte** (1–0)	VanLanen (0–1)	None	3,607	2–0	–
February 18	Valparaiso		Sewell–Thomas Stadium	12–6	**Vainer** (1–0)	Gordon (0–1)	**Guffey** (1)	2,867	3–0	–
February 20	Middle Tennessee		Sewell–Thomas Stadium	4–0	**Adams** (1–0)	Lester (0–1)	None	2,902	4–0	–
February 23 (1)	Washington State		Sewell–Thomas Stadium	12–4	**Finnerty** (2–0)	Mullins (0–2)	None	3,882	5–0	–
February 23 (2)	Washington State		Sewell–Thomas Stadium	8–2	**Walters** (1–0)	Anderson (0–2)	**Medders** (1)	3,882	6–0	–
February 24	Washington State		Sewell–Thomas Stadium	9–3	**Guffey** (1–0)	Sunitsch (0–1)	None	3,204	7–0	–
February 27	at Samford	No. 30	Griffin Stadium; Birmingham, AL	13–3	**Rukes** (1–0)	Widra (0–1)	None	1,344	8–0	–
February 28	Alabama State	No. 30	Sewell–Thomas Stadium	11–1	**Duke** (1–0)	Vazquez (0–1)	None	2,795	9–0	–

March (9–10)

Date	Opponent	Rank	Stadium Site	Score	Win	Loss	Save	Attendance	Overall Record	SEC Record
March 2	at Oklahoma	No. 30	Mitchell Park; Norman, OK	1–2^{11}	Hansen (1–1)	**Cameron** (0–1)	None	1,380	9–1	–
March 3	at Oklahoma	No. 30	Mitchell Park	4–16	Grove (1–0)	**Walters** (1–1)	None	1,775	9–2	–
March 4	at Oklahoma	No. 30	Mitchell Park	13–1	**Gardner** (1–0)	Tyler (0–2)	None	779	10–2	–
March 7	No. 24 Southern Miss		Sewell–Thomas Stadium	3–0	**Love** (1–0)	Powell (0–1)	**Duarte** (1)	3,279	11–2	–
March 9 (1)	New Mexico State		Sewell–Thomas Stadium	0–3	Dehn (2–1)	**Finnerty** (2–1)	Whittlesey (1)	3,109	11–3	–
March 9 (2)	New Mexico State		Sewell–Thomas Stadium	3–1	**Walters** (2–1)	Bradish (2–1)	**Medders** (2)	3,109	12–3	–
March 10	New Mexico State		Sewell–Thomas Stadium	5–2	**Vainer** (2–0)	Groff (2–1)	**Duarte** (2)	2,530	13–3	–
March 13	Alabama A&M		Sewell–Thomas Stadium	15–0^{7}	**Duke** (2–0)	Warner (0–1)	None	2,712	14–3	–
March 14	Alabama A&M		Sewell–Thomas Stadium	14–0^{7}	**Greene** (1–0)	Milam (0–5)	None	2,623	15–3	–
March 16	Georgia		Sewell–Thomas Stadium	10–9^{13}	**Duarte** (2–0)	Kristofak (1–1)	None	2,935	16–3	1–0
March 17	Georgia		Sewell–Thomas Stadium	5–6	Hancock (2–1)	**Walters** (2–2)	Proctor (2)	3,392	16–4	1–1
March 18	Georgia		Sewell–Thomas Stadium	5–6	Locey (3–0)	**Vainer** (2–1)	Kristofak (2)	3,265	16–5	1–2
March 20	at UAB		Regions Field; Birmingham, AL	4–6	Calvert (1–0)	**Gardner** (1–1)	Jones (1)	1,757	16–6	–
March 23	at Tennessee		Lindsey Nelson Stadium; Knoxville, TN	4–5	Linginfelter (2–1)	**Medders** (0–1)	None	1,874	16–7	1–3
March 24	at Tennessee		Lindsey Nelson Stadium	Postponed (inclement weather) Makeup: March 25 as a single-admission, 7-inning doubleheader						
March 25 (1)	at Tennessee		Lindsey Nelson Stadium	1–2^{7}	Stallings (4–1)	**Walters** (2–3)	None	–	16–8	1–4
March 25 (2)	at Tennessee		Lindsey Nelson Stadium	0–3^{7}	Neely (3–1)	**Rukes** (1–1)	None	2,299	16–9	1–5
March 27 †	vs. No. 16 Auburn		Riverwalk Stadium; Montgomery, AL	2–5	Owen (1–1)	**Duke** (2–1)	Coker (5)	7,719	16–10	–
March 30	No. 15 Kentucky		Sewell–Thomas Stadium	4–2	**Finnerty** (3–1)	Hjelle (4–2)	**Medders** (3)	4,421	17–10	2–5
March 31	No. 15 Kentucky		Sewell–Thomas Stadium	4–2	**Duarte** (3–0)	Haake (1–1)	**Medders** (4)	4,403	18–10	3–5

April (5–13)

Date	Opponent	Rank	Stadium Site	Score	Win	Loss	Save	Attendance	Overall Record	SEC Record
April 1	No. 15 Kentucky		Sewell–Thomas Stadium	2–5	Lewis (5–2)	**Guffey** (1–1)	Machamer (2)	3,399	18–11	3–6
April 3	Jacksonville State		Sewell–Thomas Stadium	0–4	Chandler (2–0)	**Gardner** (3–1)	Simpson (5)	3,119	18–12	–
April 6	at No. 23 Missouri		Taylor Stadium; Columbia, MO	2–1	**Finnerty** (4–1)	Sikkema (2–2)	**Medders** (5)	406	19–12	4–6
April 7 (1)	at No. 23 Missouri		Taylor Stadium	0–1	Plassmeyer (4–0)	**Duarte** (3–1)	None	541	19–13	4–7
April 7 (2)	at No. 23 Missouri		Taylor Stadium	5–1	**Cameron** (2–1)	Montes (4–2)	**Medders** (6)	541	20–13	5–7
April 10	UAB		Sewell–Thomas Stadium	12–3	**Adams** (2–0)	Ruggles (0–2)	None	3,724	21–13	–
April 12	at No. 22 Texas A&M		Olsen Field; College Station, TX	6–12	Sherrod (3–1)	**Duarte** (3–2)	Hoffman (6)	4,607	21–14	5–8
April 13	at No. 22 Texas A&M		Olsen Field	6–9	Kilkenny (8–0)	**Walters** (2–4)	Lacy (1)	6,094	21–15	5–9
April 14	at No. 22 Texas A&M		Olsen Field	2–3^{11}	Hoffman (4–1)	**Medders** (0–2)	None	6,901	21–16	5–10
April 17	Samford		Sewell–Thomas Stadium	0–6	Skinner (4–1)	**Duke** (2–2)	None	3,008	21–17	–
April 18	Alcorn State		Sewell–Thomas Stadium	3–0	**Adams** (3–0)	Osborne III (0–6)	**Stutts** (1)	2,741	22–17	–
April 20	Auburn		Sewell–Thomas Stadium	5–19	Mize (8–1)	**Finnerty** (4–2)	None	5,593	22–18	5–11
April 21 (1)	Auburn		Sewell–Thomas Stadium	0–5	Burns (3–4)	**Walters** (2–5)	None	6,051	22–19	5–12
April 22 (2)	Auburn		Sewell–Thomas Stadium	5–20	Davis (3–3)	**Rukes** (1–2)	None	6,051	22–20	5–13
April 24	Troy		Sewell–Thomas Stadium	4–3	**Love** (2–0)	Goodwin (3–3)	**Cameron** (1)	3,308	23–20	–
April 27	at No. 10 Arkansas		Baum Stadium; Fayetteville, AR	3–7	Knight (7–0)	**Finnerty** (4–3)	Reindl (3)	10,835	23–21	5–14
April 28	at No. 10 Arkansas		Baum Stadium	4–7	Lee (4–2)	**Guffey** (1–2)	Loseke (2)	10,846	23–22	5–15
April 29	at No. 10 Arkansas		Baum Stadium	7–9	Loseke (1–1)	**Duarte** (3–3)	Reindl (4)	9,265	23–23	5–16

May (4–6)

Date	Opponent	Rank	Stadium Site	Score	Win	Loss	Save	Attendance	Overall Record	SEC Record
May 4	Mississippi State		Sewell–Thomas Stadium	12–14^{10}	Neff (3–2)	**Medders** (0–3)	None	3,411	23–24	5–17
May 5	Mississippi State		Sewell–Thomas Stadium	4–3^{10}	**Gardner** (2–2)	Gordon (3–3)	None	4,631	24–24	6–17
May 6	Mississippi State		Sewell–Thomas Stadium	4–6	France (3–2)	**Cameron** (1–2)	None	4,637	24–25	6–18
May 8	Jacksonville State		Sewell–Thomas Stadium	9–8	**Gardner** (3–2)	Simpson (0–3)	None	2,766	25–25	–
May 11	at LSU		Alex Box Stadium; Baton Rouge, LA	5–7	Kodros (1–1)	**Medders** (0–4)	Peterson (3)	10,685	25–26	6–19
May 12	at LSU		Alex Box Stadium	6–1	**Walters** (3–5)	Hilliard (8–4)	None	11,153	26–26	7–19
May 13	at LSU		Alex Box Stadium	3–7	Bush (1–1)	**Rukes** (1–3)	None	10,758	26–27	7–20
May 17	No. 10 Ole Miss		Sewell–Thomas Stadium	2–3	Rollison (8–4)	**Finnerty** (4–4)	Caracci (10)	3,305	26–28	7–21
May 18	No. 10 Ole Miss		Sewell–Thomas Stadium	3–0	**Walters** (4–5)	Feigl (8–5)	None	3,373	27–28	8–21
May 19	No. 10 Ole Miss		Sewell–Thomas Stadium	8–10	Holston (2–0)	**Cameron** (1–3)	None	3,991	27–29	8–22

† Indicates the game does not count toward the 2018 Southeastern Conference standings.
Rankings are based on the team's current ranking in the Collegiate Baseball poll.

== Record vs. conference opponents ==
Last two do not qualify for conf. tourn. Blank are not scheduled. Blue are home games, otherwise away.

2018 SEC baseball records Source: 2018 SEC baseball game results
Team	W–L	ALA	ARK	AUB	FLA	UGA	KEN	LSU	MSU	MIZZ	MISS	SCAR	TENN	TAMU	VAN	Team	Div	SR	SW
ALA	8–22		0–3	0–3	.	1–2	2–1	1–2	1–2	2–1	1–2	.	0–3	0–3	.	ALA	W7	2–8	0–4
ARK	18–12	3–0		3–0	1–2	1–2	3–0	1–2	0–3	.	1–2	2–1	.	3–0	.	ARK	W2	5–5	4–1
AUB	15–15	3–0	0–3		1–2	.	1–2	2–1	2–1	1–2	0–3	.	.	2–1	3–0	AUB	W3	5–5	2–2
FLA	20–10	.	2–1	2–1		2–1	2–1	.	0–3	3–0	.	2–1	2–1	2–1	3–0	FLA	E1	9–1	2–1
UGA	18–12	2–1	2–1	.	1–2		1–2	.	.	3–0	1–2	3–0	2–1	2–1	1–2	UGA	E2	6–4	2–0
KEN	13–17	1–2	0–3	2–1	1–2	2–1		.	2–1	2–1	.	2–1	1–2	.	0–3	KEN	E5	5–5	0–2
LSU	15–15	2–1	2–1	1–2	.	.	.		2–1	2–1	1–2	0–3	3–0	1–2	1–2	LSU	W4	5–5	1–1
MSU	15–15	2–1	3–0	1–2	3–0	.	1–2	1–2		1–2	2–1	.	.	1–2	0–3	MSU	W5	4–6	2–1
MIZZ	12–18	1–2	.	2–1	0–3	0–3	1–2	1–2	2–1		.	1–2	2–1	.	2–1	MIZZ	E6	4–6	0–2
MISS	18–12	2–1	2–1	3–0	.	2–1	.	2–1	1–2	.		1–2	2–1	2–1	1–2	MISS	W1	7–3	1–0
SCAR	17–13	.	1–2	.	1–2	0–3	1–2	3–0	.	2–1	2–1		3–0	2–1	2–1	SCAR	E3	6–4	2–1
TENN	12–18	3–0	.	.	1–2	1–2	2–1	0–3	.	1–2	1–2	0–3		2–1	1–2	TENN	E7	3–7	1–2
TAMU	13–17	3–0	0–3	1–2	1–2	1–2	.	2–1	2–1	.	1–2	1–2	1–2		.	TAMU	W6	3–7	1–1
VAN	16–14	.	.	0–3	0–3	2–1	3–0	2–1	3–0	1–2	2–1	1–2	2–1	.		VAN	E4	6–4	2–2
Team	W–L	ALA	ARK	AUB	FLA	UGA	KEN	LSU	MSU	MIZZ	MISS	SCAR	TENN	TAMU	VAN	Team	Div	SR	SW

Updated for entire regular season.

== Rankings ==
Ranking movements Legend: ██ Increase in ranking ██ Decrease in ranking — = Not ranked RV = Received votes
	Week																		
Poll	Pre	1	2	3	4	5	6	7	8	9	10	11	12	13	14	15	16	17	Final
Coaches'	—	—*	—	RV	RV	RV	—	—	—	—	—	—	—	—	—	—	—	—	—
Baseball America	—	—	—	—	—	—	—	—	—	—	—	—	—	—	—	—	—	—	—
Collegiate Baseball^	—	RV	30	—	—	—	—	—	—	—	—	—	—	—	—	—	—	—	—
NCBWA†	—	RV	29	RV	27	29	RV	RV	RV	—	—	—	—	—	—	—	—	—	—

^ Collegiate Baseball ranked 40 teams in their preseason poll, but only ranked 30 teams weekly during the season.
† NCBWA ranks 30 teams in their preseason poll, but only ranks 25 teams weekly during the season.
* A new poll was not released for this week, so for comparison purposes, the previous week's ranking is inserted in this week's slot.

== See also ==
- 2018 Alabama Crimson Tide softball team
