= 2018 South Carolina Gamecocks baseball team =

American college baseball season

2018 South Carolina Gamecocks baseball

Greenville Regional champions

Fayetteville Super Regional
- Conference: Southeastern Conference

Ranking
- Coaches: No. 17
- CB: No. 12
- Record: 37–26 (17–13 SEC)
- Head coach: Mark Kingston (1st season)
- Assistant coaches: Mark Current (1st season); Stuart Lake (2nd season)
- Pitching coach: Skylar Meade (1st season)
- Home stadium: Founders Park

2018 Southeastern Conference baseball standings
	Conf.				Overall
Team	W		L	PCT	W		L	PCT
East Division
No. 3 Florida ^{x}‍†‍‍^{y}	20	–	10	.667	49	–	21	.700
No. 20 Georgia ‍‍‍^{y}	18	–	12	.600	39	–	21	.650
No. 12 South Carolina ‍‍‍^{y}	17	–	13	.567	37	–	26	.587
No. 16 Vanderbilt ‍‍‍^{y}	16	–	14	.533	35	–	27	.565
Kentucky ‍‍‍	13	–	17	.433	34	–	22	.607
Missouri ‍‍‍	12	–	18	.400	34	–	22	.607
Tennessee ‍‍‍	12	–	18	.400	29	–	27	.518
West Division
No. 19 Ole Miss ^{x}‍‍‡‍^{y}	18	–	12	.600	48	–	18	.727
No. 2 Arkansas ^{x}‍‍‍^{y}	18	–	12	.600	48	–	21	.696
No. 15 Auburn ‍‍‍^{y}	15	–	15	.500	43	–	23	.652
LSU ‍‍‍^{y}	15	–	15	.500	39	–	27	.591
No. 4 Mississippi State ‍‍‍^{y}	15	–	15	.500	39	–	29	.574
Texas A&M ‍‍‍^{y}	13	–	17	.433	40	–	22	.645
Alabama ‍‍‍	8	–	22	.267	27	–	29	.482
x – Division champion † – Conference champion ‡ – Tournament champion y – Invited to the NCAA tournament Rankings from Collegiate Baseball

The 2018 South Carolina Gamecocks baseball team represented the University of South Carolina in the 2018 NCAA Division I baseball season. The Gamecocks played their home games at Founders Park. The team was led by first year head coach Mark Kingston.

== Roster ==
2018 South Carolina Gamecocks baseball team
Players
Coaches

#	Pos.	Name	B/T	Height	Weight	Year	Home town
2	INF	Noah Campbell	S/R	5 ft 11 in (1.8 m)	193 lb (88 kg)	Fr	Durham, NC
3	INF	Justin Row	R/R	5 ft 8 in (1.73 m)	190 lb (86 kg)	Sr	La Verne, CA
4	OF	Danny Blair	L/R	5 ft 11 in (1.8 m)	199 lb (90 kg)	Jr	Bel Air, MD
5	OF	TJ Hopkins	R/R	6 ft 0 in (1.83 m)	199 lb (90 kg)	Jr	Summerville, SC
6	OF	Kyle Jacobsen	R/L	6 ft 0 in (1.83 m)	177 lb (80 kg)	Fr	Acworth, GA
7		Jacob Olson	R/R	5 ft 11 in (1.8 m)	188 lb (85 kg)	Jr	Monroe, GA
8	OF	Carlos Cortes	L/S	5 ft 8 in (1.73 m)	192 lb (87 kg)	So	Oviedo, FL
9	RHP	Eddy Demurias	R/R	6 ft 0 in (1.83 m)	184 lb (83 kg)	Jr	Miami, FL
10	INF	Mason Streater	R/R	5 ft 11 in (1.8 m)	210 lb (95 kg)	Fr	Duncan, SC
11	INF	LT Tolbert	L/R	6 ft 2 in (1.88 m)	200 lb (91 kg)	Jr	Piedmont, SC
13	RHP	Graham Lawson	R/R	6 ft 1 in (1.85 m)	223 lb (101 kg)	Jr	Woodruff, SC
14	INF	Madison Stokes	R/R	6 ft 3 in (1.91 m)	208 lb (94 kg)	Sr	Columbia, SC
15	RHP	Adam Hill	R/R	6 ft 3 in (1.91 m)	229 lb (104 kg)	Jr	Anderson, SC
16	LHP	John Gilreath	L/L	5 ft 11 in (1.8 m)	191 lb (87 kg)	Fr	Rock Hill, SC
20	INF	Jonah Bride	R/R	5 ft 10 in (1.78 m)	208 lb (94 kg)	Sr	Owasso, OK
21	RHP	Carmen Mlodzinski	R/R	6 ft 1 in (1.85 m)	198 lb (90 kg)	Fr	Hilton Head, SC
22	RHP	Logan Chapman	R/R	6 ft 1 in (1.85 m)	190 lb (86 kg)	Fr	Liberty, SC
23	RHP	Sawyer Bridges	R/R	6 ft 0 in (1.83 m)	185 lb (84 kg)	So	Summerville, SC
24	OF	Ian Jenkins	R/R	5 ft 11 in (1.8 m)	213 lb (97 kg)	Fr	Suwanee, GA
27	RHP	Gage Hinson	R/R	6 ft 4 in (1.93 m)	183 lb (83 kg)	Jr	Lancaster, SC
28	RHP	Ridge Chapman	R/R	6 ft 0 in (1.83 m)	228 lb (103 kg)	Jr	Taylors, SC
30	RHP	Shane Roberts	R/R	5 ft 11 in (1.8 m)	193 lb (88 kg)	Fr	Jupiter, FL
32	INF	Riley Hogan	S/R	6 ft 1 in (1.85 m)	219 lb (99 kg)	So	Orlando, FL
33	C	Chris Cullen	R/R	6 ft 5 in (1.96 m)	226 lb (103 kg)	Jr	Cumming, GA
34	RHP	Hunter Lomas	R/R	6 ft 2 in (1.88 m)	192 lb (87 kg)	Jr	Blythewood, SC
35	INF	Jordan Holladay	R/R	6 ft 0 in (1.83 m)	223 lb (101 kg)	Fr	Sumter, SC
36	RHP	TJ Shook	R/R	6 ft 3 in (1.91 m)	198 lb (90 kg)	Fr	Columbia, SC
37	RHP	Cam Tringali	R/R	6 ft 4 in (1.93 m)	188 lb (85 kg)	Fr	Columbia, SC
38	C	Hunter Taylor	R/R	5 ft 11 in (1.8 m)	226 lb (103 kg)	Sr	Onley, VA
40	C	Elijah Bowers	R/R	5 ft 9 in (1.75 m)	212 lb (96 kg)	Fr	Matthews, NC
41	LHP	Corey Stone	L/L	6 ft 1 in (1.85 m)	176 lb (80 kg)	Fr	Prosperity, SC
43	RHP	Wilson Beattie	R/R	6 ft 1 in (1.85 m)	180 lb (82 kg)	Fr	Summerville, SC
44	RHP	Parker Coyne	R/R	6 ft 2 in (1.88 m)	182 lb (83 kg)	Fr	Suwanee, GA
48	INF	Matt Williams	L/R	6 ft 0 in (1.83 m)	217 lb (98 kg)	Sr	Honea Path, SC
49	RHP	Cody Morris	R/R	6 ft 5 in (1.96 m)	222 lb (101 kg)	So	Laurel, MD

Head coach

17 Mark Kingston

Assistant coach(es)

19 Stuart Lake
25 Skylar Meade
39 Mike Current

Legend

- (C) Team captain
- (S) Suspended
- (I) Ineligible
- Injured
- Current redshirt

Roster
Last update: February 6, 2018

=== Coaching staff ===
2018 South Carolina Gamecocks baseball coaching staff
- 17 Mark Kingston - Head coach - 1st year
- 39 Mike Current - Assistant coach - 1st year
- 19 Stuart Lake - Assistant coach - 2nd year
- 25 Skylar Meade - Pitching coach - 1st year

== Schedule ==
2018 South Carolina Gamecocks baseball game log
Regular season
February

Date	Opponent	Rank	Stadium Site	Score	Win	Loss	Save	Attendance	Overall Record	SEC Record
February 16	VMI	No. 19	Founders Park; Columbia, SC	6–7	Tremblay (1–0)	Hill (0–1)	Eagle (1)	7,484	0–1	–
February 17	VMI	No. 19	Founders Park	7–2	Morris (1–0)	Kent 0-1	None	6,627	1–1	–
February 18	VMI	No. 19	Founders Park	9–0	R. Chapman (1–0)	Watts (0–1)	None	6,612	2–1	–
February 20	North Florida	No. 21	Founders Park	5–2	Bridges (1–0)	Vaka (0–1)	Demurias (1)	6,120	3–1	–
February 21	Winthrop	No. 21	Founders Park	15–2	L. Chapman (1–0)	Arnone (0–1)	None	6,080	4–1	–
February 23	Charleston Southern	No. 21	Founders Park	7–0	Hill (1–1)	Constantakos (1–1)	None	6,577	5–1	–
February 24	Charleston Southern	No. 21	Founders Park	14–2	Morris (2–0)	Stoudemire 0–2	None	7,423	6–1	–
February 25	Charleston Southern	No. 21	Founders Park	2–4	Weekley (1–1)	R. Chapman (1–1)	Smith (2)	6,353	6–2	–
February 27	Furman	No. 23	Founders Park	4–6	Alley (1–0)	Mlodzinski (0–1)	Schuermann (1)	6,107	6–3	–

March

Date	Opponent	Rank	Stadium Site	Score	Win	Loss	Save	Attendance	Overall Record	SEC Record
March 2	No. 7 Clemson	No. 23	Founders Park	3–2	Demurias (1–0)	Gilliam 1–1	None	8,242	7–3	–
March 3	vs. No. 7 Clemson	No. 23	Fluor Field; Greenville, SC	1–5	Clark (2–0)	Morris (2–1)	Miller (1)	7,385	7–4	–
March 4	at No. 7 Clemson	No. 23	Doug Kingsmore Stadium; Clemson, SC	7–8	Gilliam (2–1)	Mlodzinski (0–2)	None	6,312	7–5	–
March 6	vs. Appalachian State		BB&T Ballpark; Charlotte, NC	Cancelled (rain)						
March 7	North Carolina A&T		Founders Park	12–2	Shook (1–0)	McAlister 0–1	None	6,027	8–5	–
March 9	Princeton		Founders Park	9–2	Hill (2–1)	Gross (0–2)	Gilreath (1)	6,245	9–5	–
March 10 (1)	Princeton		Founders Park	7–3	Morris (3–1)	Smith (0–1)	Lomas (1)	6,425	10–5	–
March 10 (2)	Princeton		Founders Park	6–4	Demurias (2–0)	Proctor (0–1)	Mlodzinski (1)	6,114	11–5	–
March 14	Harvard		Founders Park	12–3	Coyne (1–0)	Bigge (1–1)	None	5,705	12–5	–
March 16	No. 6 Florida		Founders Park	3–7	Singer (5–0)	Hill (2–2)	Byrne (4)	7,034	12–6	0–1
March 17	No. 6 Florida		Founders Park	15–7	Morris (4–1)	Kowar (3–1)	None	7,207	13–6	1–1
March 18	No. 6 Florida		Founders Park	2–3	Dyson (4–1)	R. Chapman (1–2)	Byrne (5)	7,113	13–7	1–2
March 20	The Citadel		Founders Park	3–4	Buster (3–1)	Coyne (1–1)	None	6,307	13–8	–
March 23	at Georgia		Foley Field; Athens, GA	5–7	Locey (4–0)	Lawson (0–1)	Schunk (1)	2,785	13–9	1–3
March 24	at Georgia		Foley Field	3–12	Hancock (3–1)	Morris (0–2)	None	3,481	13–10	1–4
March 25	at Georgia		Foley Field	0–3	Webb (1–1)	R. Chapman (1–3)	Schunk (2)	2,443	13–11	1–5
March 27	Davidson		Founders Park	5–4	L. Chapman (2–0)	LaCagnina (0–2)	Demurias (2)	5,824	14–11	–
March 29	Tennessee		Founders Park	6–1	Hill (3–2)	Crochet (2–3)	None	6,425	15–11	2–5
March 30	Tennessee		Founders Park	6–2	Morris (5–2)	Stallings (4–2)	None	6,945	16–11	3–5
March 31	Tennessee		Founders Park	6–3	Demurias (3–0)	Linginfelter (2–2)	None	7,816	17–11	4–5

April

Date	Opponent	Rank	Stadium Site	Score	Win	Loss	Save	Attendance	Overall Record	SEC Record
April 3	vs. No. 30 North Carolina		BB&T Ballpark	3–11	Lancellotti (1–2)	Mlodzinski (0–3)	None	7,410	17–12	–
April 6	at Kentucky		Cliff Hagan Stadium; Lexington, KY	1–14	Hjelle (5–2)	Hill (3–3)	None	3,422	17–13	4–6
April 7	at Kentucky		Cliff Hagan Stadium	15–1	Morris (6–2)	Haake (1–2)	Bridges (1)	2,642	18–13	5–6
April 8	at Kentucky		Cliff Hagan Stadium	5–10	Lewis (6–2)	R. Chapman (1–4)	Machamer (4)	2,853	18–14	5–7
April 10	at The Citadel		Joseph P. Riley Jr. Park; Charleston, SC	12–1	Mlodzinski (1–3)	Sabo (0–1)	None	1,573	19–14	–
April 12	at No. 7 Arkansas		Baum Stadium; Fayetteville, AR	3–2	Bridges (2–0)	Loseke (0–1)	Demurias (3)	8,416	20–14	6–7
April 13	at No. 7 Arkansas		Baum Stadium	Postponed (severe weather) Makeup: April 14 as a single-admission, 7-inning doubleheader						
April 14 (1)	at No. 7 Arkansas		Baum Stadium	0–2^{7}	Murphy (5–2)	Hill (3–4)	Cronin (8)	9,680	20–15	6–8
April 14 (2)	at No. 7 Arkansas		Baum Stadium	0–3^{7}	Campbell (3–3)	Morris (6–3)	Cronin (9)	9,680	20–16	6–9
April 17	Presbyterian		Founders Park	4–7	Paradis (1–3)	Mlodzinski (1–4)	Springs (1)	6,104	20–17	–
April 20	No. 18 LSU		Founders Park	11–0	L. Chapman (3–0)	Hess (6–4)	None	6,952	21–17	7–9
April 21	No. 18 LSU		Founders Park	11–4	Hill (4–4)	Hilliard (7–3)	None	7,982	22–17	8–9
April 22	No. 18 LSU		Founders Park	8–6	Demurias (4–0)	Bain (1–2)	Bridges (2)	7,141	23–17	9–9
April 24	at Furman	No. 25	Latham Baseball Stadium; Greenville, SC	10–2	Mlodzinski (2–4)	Alley (2–3)	None	2,030	24–17	–
April 27	at No. 12 Vanderbilt	No. 25	Hawkins Field; Nashville, TN	8–7	Shook (2–0)	Brown (1–3)	Bridges (3)	2,895	25–17	10–9
April 28	at No. 12 Vanderbilt	No. 25	Hawkins Field	1–8	Raby (3–4)	Hill (4–5)	None	3,166	25–18	10–10
April 29	at No. 12 Vanderbilt	No. 25	Hawkins Field	10–9	Lawson (1–1)	Day (1–1)	None	3,158	26–18	11–10

May

Date	Opponent	Rank	Stadium Site	Score	Win	Loss	Save	Attendance	Overall Record	SEC Record
May 4	No. 11 Ole Miss	No. 14	Founders Park	13–5	Shook (3–0)	Rolison (6–4)	None	7,559	27–18	12–10
May 5	No. 11 Ole Miss	No. 14	Founders Park	11–6	Hill (5–5)	Feigl (7–4)	None	7,692	28–18	13–10
May 6	No. 11 Ole Miss	No. 14	Founders Park	5–6^{10}	Caracci (3–2)	Bridges (2–1)	None	6,852	28–19	13–11
May 9	vs. College of Charleston	No. 11	Spirit Communications Park; Columbia, SC	0–9	Sisk (9–3)	Mlodzinski (2–5)	None	5,867	28–20	–
May 11	Missouri	No. 11	Founders Park	3–5	Toelken (5–2)	L. Chapman (3–1)	Ball (6)	6,922	28–21	13–12
May 12	Missouri	No. 11	Founders Park	6–3	Hill (6–5)	Plassmeyer (5–3)	None	7,216	29–21	14–12
May 13	Missouri	No. 11	Founders Park	1–0	Demurias (5–0)	LaPlante (4–3)	None	6,435	30–21	15–12
May 15	USC Upstate	No. 11	Founders Park	Canceled (impending weather)						
May 17	at Texas A&M	No. 11	Olsen Field; College Station, TX	3–6	Chafin (4–0)	L. Chapman (3–2)	None	4,615	30–22	15–13
May 18	at Texas A&M	No. 11	Olsen Field	5–3	Hill (7–5)	Doxakis (6–5)	Lawson (1)	4,770	31–22	16–13
May 19	at Texas A&M	No. 11	Olsen Field	10–1	Morris (7–3)	Kolek (5–6)	None	5,101	32–22	17–13

Postseason
SEC Tournament

Date	Opponent	Rank	Stadium Site	Score	Win	Loss	Save	Attendance	Overall Record	SECT Record
May 22	vs. (12) Missouri	No. 14 (5)	Metropolitan Stadium; Hoover, AL	4–2	Demurias (6–0)	Toelken (6–3)	Lawson (2)	8,072	33–22	1–0
May 23	vs. No. 9 (4) Arkansas	No. 14 (5)	Metropolitan Stadium	8–13	Murphy (7–4)	L. Chapman (3–3)	None	6,710	33–23	1–1
May 24	vs. (8) LSU	No. 14 (5)	Metropolitan Stadium	4–6^{12}	Peterson (1–3)	Gilreath (0–1)	None	7,197	33–24	1–2

NCAA tournament: Greenville Regional

Date	Opponent	Rank	Stadium Site	Score	Win	Loss	Save	Attendance	Overall Record	Regional Record
June 1	vs. (3) Ohio State	No. 19 (2)	Clark–LeClair Stadium; Greenville, NC	8–3	Demurias (7–0)	Kinker (6–2)	Lawson (3)	4,700	34–24	1–0
June 2	at No. 18 (1) East Carolina	No. 19 (2)	Clark–LeClair Stadium	4–2	Morris (8–3)	Burleson (5–2)	Lawson (4)	4,700	35–24	2–0
June 3	vs. (4) UNC Wilmington	No. 19 (2)	Clark–LeClair Stadium	Postponed (rain) Makeup: June 4						
June 4	vs. (4) UNC Wilmington	No. 19 (2)	Clark–LeClair Stadium	8–4	Mlodzinski (3–5)	Royalty (6–6)	None	4,700	36–24	3–0

NCAA tournament: Fayetteville Super Regional

Date	Opponent	Rank	Stadium Site	Score	Win	Loss	Save	Attendance	Overall Record	Super Reg. Record
June 9	at No. 4 (5) Arkansas	No. 10	Baum Stadium	3–9	Knight (12–0)	Demurias (7–1)	Loseke (4)	11,722	36–25	0–1
June 10	vs. No. 4 (5) Arkansas	No. 10	Baum Stadium	8–5	Morris (9–3)	Murphy (8–5)	Bridges (5)	11,481	37–25	1–1
June 11	at No. 4 (5) Arkansas	No. 10	Baum Stadium	4–14	Loseke (3–2)	Mlodzinski (3–6)	None	11,217	37–26	1–2

== Record vs. conference opponents ==
Last two do not qualify for conf. tourn. Blank are not scheduled. Blue are home games, otherwise away.

2018 SEC baseball records Source: 2018 SEC baseball game results
Team	W–L	ALA	ARK	AUB	FLA	UGA	KEN	LSU	MSU	MIZZ	MISS	SCAR	TENN	TAMU	VAN	Team	Div	SR	SW
ALA	8–22		0–3	0–3	.	1–2	2–1	1–2	1–2	2–1	1–2	.	0–3	0–3	.	ALA	W7	2–8	0–4
ARK	18–12	3–0		3–0	1–2	1–2	3–0	1–2	0–3	.	1–2	2–1	.	3–0	.	ARK	W2	5–5	4–1
AUB	15–15	3–0	0–3		1–2	.	1–2	2–1	2–1	1–2	0–3	.	.	2–1	3–0	AUB	W3	5–5	2–2
FLA	20–10	.	2–1	2–1		2–1	2–1	.	0–3	3–0	.	2–1	2–1	2–1	3–0	FLA	E1	9–1	2–1
UGA	18–12	2–1	2–1	.	1–2		1–2	.	.	3–0	1–2	3–0	2–1	2–1	1–2	UGA	E2	6–4	2–0
KEN	13–17	1–2	0–3	2–1	1–2	2–1		.	2–1	2–1	.	2–1	1–2	.	0–3	KEN	E5	5–5	0–2
LSU	15–15	2–1	2–1	1–2	.	.	.		2–1	2–1	1–2	0–3	3–0	1–2	1–2	LSU	W4	5–5	1–1
MSU	15–15	2–1	3–0	1–2	3–0	.	1–2	1–2		1–2	2–1	.	.	1–2	0–3	MSU	W5	4–6	2–1
MIZZ	12–18	1–2	.	2–1	0–3	0–3	1–2	1–2	2–1		.	1–2	2–1	.	2–1	MIZZ	E6	4–6	0–2
MISS	18–12	2–1	2–1	3–0	.	2–1	.	2–1	1–2	.		1–2	2–1	2–1	1–2	MISS	W1	7–3	1–0
SCAR	17–13	.	1–2	.	1–2	0–3	1–2	3–0	.	2–1	2–1		3–0	2–1	2–1	SCAR	E3	6–4	2–1
TENN	12–18	3–0	.	.	1–2	1–2	2–1	0–3	.	1–2	1–2	0–3		2–1	1–2	TENN	E7	3–7	1–2
TAMU	13–17	3–0	0–3	1–2	1–2	1–2	.	2–1	2–1	.	1–2	1–2	1–2		.	TAMU	W6	3–7	1–1
VAN	16–14	.	.	0–3	0–3	2–1	3–0	2–1	3–0	1–2	2–1	1–2	2–1	.		VAN	E4	6–4	2–2
Team	W–L	ALA	ARK	AUB	FLA	UGA	KEN	LSU	MSU	MIZZ	MISS	SCAR	TENN	TAMU	VAN	Team	Div	SR	SW

Updated for entire regular season.

== Rankings ==
Ranking movements Legend: ██ Increase in ranking ██ Decrease in ranking — = Not ranked RV = Received votes т = Tied with team above or below
	Week																		
Poll	Pre	1	2	3	4	5	6	7	8	9	10	11	12	13	14	15	16	17	Final
Coaches'	RV	RV*	RV	—	—	—	—	—	—	—	RV	RV	RV	RV	24	RV	RV*	RV*	17
Baseball America	—	—	—	—	—	—	—	—	—	—	—	—	—	23	22	—	—*	—*	16
Collegiate Baseball^	19	21	23	—	—	—	—	—	—	—	25	14	11	11	14	19	10	12	12
NCBWA†	32	RV	RV	—	RV	—	—	—	—	—	—	RV	RV	29т	25	28	12	12*	

^ Collegiate Baseball ranked 40 teams in their preseason poll, but only ranked 30 teams weekly during the season.
† NCBWA ranks 30 teams in their preseason poll, but only ranks 25 teams weekly during the season.
* A new poll was not released for this week, so for comparison purposes, the previous week's ranking is inserted in this week's slot.
