= 2018 Ole Miss Rebels baseball team =

Baseball team

2018 Ole Miss Rebels baseball

SEC tournament champion SEC Western Division co-champion

Oxford Regional, 2-2
- Conference: Southeastern Conference
- Western Division
- Record: 48–17 (18–12 SEC)
- Head coach: Mike Bianco (18th season)
- Assistant coach: Marc MacMillan (3rd season)
- Hitting coach: Mike Clement (4th season)
- Pitching coach: Carl Lafferty (12th season)
- Home stadium: Swayze Field

2018 Southeastern Conference baseball standings
	Conf.				Overall
Team	W		L	PCT	W		L	PCT
East Division
No. 3 Florida ^{x}‍†‍‍^{y}	20	–	10	.667	49	–	21	.700
No. 20 Georgia ‍‍‍^{y}	18	–	12	.600	39	–	21	.650
No. 12 South Carolina ‍‍‍^{y}	17	–	13	.567	37	–	26	.587
No. 16 Vanderbilt ‍‍‍^{y}	16	–	14	.533	35	–	27	.565
Kentucky ‍‍‍	13	–	17	.433	34	–	22	.607
Missouri ‍‍‍	12	–	18	.400	34	–	22	.607
Tennessee ‍‍‍	12	–	18	.400	29	–	27	.518
West Division
No. 19 Ole Miss ^{x}‍‍‡‍^{y}	18	–	12	.600	48	–	18	.727
No. 2 Arkansas ^{x}‍‍‍^{y}	18	–	12	.600	48	–	21	.696
No. 15 Auburn ‍‍‍^{y}	15	–	15	.500	43	–	23	.652
LSU ‍‍‍^{y}	15	–	15	.500	39	–	27	.591
No. 4 Mississippi State ‍‍‍^{y}	15	–	15	.500	39	–	29	.574
Texas A&M ‍‍‍^{y}	13	–	17	.433	40	–	22	.645
Alabama ‍‍‍	8	–	22	.267	27	–	29	.482
x – Division champion † – Conference champion ‡ – Tournament champion y – Invited to the NCAA tournament Rankings from Collegiate Baseball

The 2018 Ole Miss Rebels baseball team represented the University of Mississippi in the 2018 NCAA Division I baseball season. The Rebels played their home games at Swayze Field.

== Personnel ==
=== Coaching staff ===
2018 Ole Miss Rebels coaching staff
- Mike Bianco – Head coach – 18th year
- Mike Clement – Assistant baseball coach – 4th year
- Carl Lafferty – Assistant coach – 12th year
- Marc MacMillan – Volunteer assistant – 3rd year
- Zach Boone – Strength and conditioning coach – 1st year

== Schedule and results ==
Legend
	Ole Miss win
	Ole Miss loss
**Bold**	Ole Miss team member

2018 Ole Miss Rebels baseball game log
Regular season (42–14)

February (8–0)
Date	Opponent	Rank	Site/stadium	Score	Win	Loss	Save	TV	Attendance	Overall record	SEC record
Feb. 16	Winthrop	#9	Swayze Field • Oxford, MS	7-3	Rolison (1-0)	Peek (0-1)		SECN+	8,797	1–0	
Feb. 17	Winthrop	#9	Swayze Field • Oxford, MS	8-1	Feigl (1-0)	Rendon (0-1)		SECN+	8,185	2–0	
Feb. 18	Winthrop	#9	Swayze Field • Oxford, MS	3-1	Fowler (1-0)	Harris (0-1)	**Woolfolk (1)**	SECN+	7,450	3–0	
Feb. 20	Memphis	#9	Swayze Field • Oxford, MS	8-6	Roth (1-0)	Denz (0-1)	**Woolfolk (2)**	SECN+	7,742	4–0	
Feb. 23	Tulane	#9	Swayze Field • Oxford, MS	5-4	Rolison (2-0)	Roper (0-1)	**Woolfolk (3)**	SECN+	8,013	5–0	
Feb. 24	Tulane	#9	Swayze Field • Oxford, MS	9-1	Feigl (2-0)	Massey (1-1)		SECN+	9,310	6–0	
Feb. 25	Tulane	#9	Swayze Field • Oxford, MS	6-3	Fowler (2-0)	Gillies (0-1)	**Woolfolk (4)**	SECN+	7,708	7–0	
Feb. 27	Murray State	#8	Swayze Field • Oxford, MS	7-6	Caracci (1-0)	Whaley (0-1)		SECN+	7,415	8–0	

March (17–4)
Date	Opponent	Rank	Site/stadium	Score	Win	Loss	Save	TV	Attendance	Overall record	SEC record
Mar. 3 (1)	at Long Beach State	#9	Blair Field • Long Beach, CA	3-4	Andrews (1-2)	**Rolison (2-1)**	Rivera (3)		1,862	8–1	
Mar. 3 (2)	at Long Beach State	#9	Blair Field • Long Beach, CA	4-3	**Feigl (3-0)**	Baayoun (2-1)	**Woolfolk (5)**		1,971	9–1	
Mar. 4	at Long Beach State	#9	Blair Field • Long Beach, CA	12-1	**McArthur (1-0)**	Radcliffe (0-1)			2,348	10–1	
Mar. 6	Austin Peay	#8	Swayze Field • Oxford, MS	11-4	**Stokes (1-0)**	Wilson (0-1)	**Ethridge (1)**	SECN+	7,832	11–1	
Mar. 7	Little Rock	#8	Swayze Field • Oxford, MS	10-2	**Caracci (2-0)**	Garcia (1-1)		SECN+	6,749	12–1	
Mar. 9 (1)	Eastern Illinois	#8	Swayze Field • Oxford, MS	7-2	**Rolison (3-1)**	Stevenson (1-2)		SECN+	8,301	13–1	
Mar. 9 (2)	Eastern Illinois	#8	Swayze Field • Oxford, MS	4-0	**Feigl (4-0)**	Malatestinic (0-1)	**Ethridge (2)**	SECN+	8,301	14–1	
Mar. 11	Eastern Illinois	#8	Swayze Field • Oxford, MS	7-3	**McArthur (2-0)**	Haws (1-2)		SECN+	7,173	15–1	
Mar. 13	at Georgia State	#6	GSU Baseball Complex • Atlanta, GA	5-3	**Roth (2-0)**	White (0-2)	**Woolfolk (6)**		435	16–1	
Mar. 14	at Georgia State	#6	GSU Baseball Complex • Atlanta, GA	16-2	**Fowler (3-0)**	Baker (1-1)			347	17–1	
Mar. 16	Tennessee	#6	Swayze Field • Oxford, MS	6-8	Crochet (2-2)	**Rolison (3-2)**	Linginfelter (2)	SECN+	7,277	17–2	0–1
Mar. 17	Tennessee	#6	Swayze Field • Oxford, MS	7-1	**Feigl (5-0)**	Stallings (3-1)		SECN+	8,875	18–2	1–1
Mar. 18	Tennessee	#6	Swayze Field • Oxford, MS	5-0	**McArthur (3-0)**	Neely (2-1)	**Caracci (1)**	SECN+	7,560	19–2	2–1
Mar. 20	New Orleans	#5	Swayze Field • Oxford, MS	9-4	**Roth (3-0)**	Schindler (1-1)		SECN+	9,996	20–2	
Mar. 22	at #12 Texas A&M	#5	Olsen Field at Blue Bell Park • College Station, TX	5-4	**Ethridge (1-0)**	Hoffman (3-1)	**Caracci (2)**	SECN	4,107	21–2	3–1
Mar. 23	at #12 Texas A&M	#5	Olsen Field at Blue Bell Park • College Station, TX	6-7	Doxakis (4-0)	**Feigl (5-1)**	Chafin (2)	SECN+	6,261	21–3	3–2
Mar. 24	at #12 Texas A&M	#5	Olsen Field at Blue Bell Park • College Station, TX	7-6	**Woolfolk (1-0)**	Lacy (0-1)	**Caracci (3)**	SECN+	6,427	22–3	4–2
Mar. 27	#14 Southern Miss	#4	Swayze Field • Oxford, MS	7-6	**Holston (1-0)**	Carroll (0-1)	**Caracci (4)**	SECN+	9,124	23–3	
Mar. 29	#5 Arkansas	#4	Swayze Field • Oxford, MS	4-6	Knight (5-0)	**Rolison (3-3)**	Cronin (5)	SECN	9,619	23–4	4–3
Mar. 30	#5 Arkansas	#4	Swayze Field • Oxford, MS	5-4	**Feigl (6-1)**	Lee (1-2)	**Caracci (5)**	SECN+	10,648	24–4	5–3
Mar. 31	#5 Arkansas	#4	Swayze Field • Oxford, MS	11-10	**McArthur (4-0)**	Murphy (3-2)	**Caracci (6)**	SECN+	11,146	25–4	6–3

April (9–7)
Date	Opponent	Rank	Site/stadium	Score	Win	Loss	Save	TV	Attendance	Overall record	SEC record
April 4	at Memphis	#3	AutoZone Park • Memphis, TN	12-0	**Roth (4-0)**	Denz (1-2)			1,732	26–4	
April 7 (1)	at Mississippi State	#3	Dudy Noble Field • Starkville, MS	3-13	Pilkington (2-4)	**Feigl (6-2)**		SECN+	6,168	26–5	6–4
April 7 (2)	at Mississippi State	#3	Dudy Noble Field • Starkville, MS	6-1	**Rolison (4-3)**	Small (2-3)		SECN+	6,168	27–5	7–4
April 8	at Mississippi State	#3	Dudy Noble Field • Starkville, MS	5-7	Smith (3-0)	**Stokes (1-1)**		SECN+	6,059	27–6	7–5
April 10	vs. #12 Southern Miss	#4	Trustmark Park • Pearl, MS	11-3	**Roth (5-0)**	Keys (2-3)			5,772	28–6	
April 13	at #15 Vanderbilt	#5	Hawkins Field • Nashville, TN	11-3	**Rolison (5-3)**	Fellows (4-2)		SECN+	3,584	29–6	8–5
April 15 (1)	at #15 Vanderbilt	#5	Hawkins Field • Nashville, TN	7-8	Gillis (3-0)	**Woolfolk (1-1)**		SECN+	3,030	29–7	8–6
April 15 (2)	at #15 Vanderbilt	#5	Hawkins Field • Nashville, TN	7-8	Fisher (2-0)	**Ethridge (1-1)**	Gillis (1)	SECN+	3,056	29–8	8–7
April 18	Arkansas State	#7	Swayze Field • Oxford, MS	10-3	**Fowler (4-0)**	Patterson (0-3)		SECN+	8,091	30–8	
April 20	#12 Georgia	#7	Swayze Field • Oxford, MS	2-3	Kristofak (2-1)	**Caracci (2-1)**	Schunk (6)	SECN+	10,399	30–9	8–8
April 21 (1)	#12 Georgia	#7	Swayze Field • Oxford, MS	8-4	**Feigl (7-2)**	Hancock (4-3)	**Stokes (1)**	SECN+	10,471	31–9	9–8
April 21 (2)	#12 Georgia	#7	Swayze Field • Oxford, MS	5-2	**McArthur (5-0)**	Webb (1-5)	**Caracci (7)**	SECN+	9,102	32–9	10–8
April 24	vs. Mississippi State; Governor's Cup	#5	Trustmark Park • Pearl, MS	6-7	Gordon (3-2)	**Caracci (2-2)**		SECN	8,515	32–10	
April 26	LSU	#5	Swayze Field • Oxford, MS	14-3	**Rolison (6-3)**	Kodros (0-1)		SECN	8,062	33–10	11–8
April 27	LSU	#5	Swayze Field • Oxford, MS	2-5	Hilliard (8-3)	**Feigl (7-3)**		SECN+	11,861	33–11	11–9
April 28	LSU	#5	Swayze Field • Oxford, MS	9-8	**Ethridge (2-1)**	Gilbert (3-4)	**Caracci (8)**	SECN+	12,152	34–11	12–9

May (8–3)
Date	Opponent	Rank	Site/stadium	Score	Win	Loss	Save	TV	Attendance	Overall record	SEC record
May 2	UAPB	#3	Swayze Field • Oxford, MS	10-3	**Fowler (5-0)**	Lopez (7-3)		SECN+	7,032	35–11	
May 4	at #14 South Carolina	#4	Founders Park • Columbia, SC	5-13	Shook (3-0)	**Rolison (6-4)**		SECN+	7,559	35–12	12–10
May 5	at #14 South Carolina	#4	Founders Park • Columbia, SC	6-11	Hill (5-5)	**Feigl (7-4)**		SECN+	7,692	35–13	12–11
May 6	at #14 South Carolina	#4	Founders Park • Columbia, SC	6-5	**Caracci (3-2)**	Bridges (2-1)		SECN	6,852	36–13	13–11
May 10	#16 Auburn	#5	Swayze Field • Oxford, MS	5-4	**Rolison (7-4)**	Daniel (3-4)	**Caracci (9)**	SECN	7,851	37–13	14–11
May 11	#16 Auburn	#5	Swayze Field • Oxford, MS	8-3	**Feigl (8-4)**	Mize (9-3)		SECN+	9,408	38–13	15–11
May 12	#16 Auburn	#5	Swayze Field • Oxford, MS	10-3	**Ethridge (3-1)**	Greenhill (3-2)		SECN+	8,655	39–13	16–11
May 15	at Arkansas State	#4	Tomlinson Stadium-Kell Field • Jonesboro, AR	15-8	**Fowler (6-0)**	Patterson (0-4)			619	40–13	
May 17	at Alabama	#4	Sewell-Thomas Stadium • Tuscaloosa, AL	3-2	**Rolison (8-4)**	Finnerty (4-4)	**Caracci (10)**	SECN+	3,305	41–13	17–11
May 18	at Alabama	#4	Sewell-Thomas Stadium • Tuscaloosa, AL	0-3	Walters (4-5)	**Feigl (8-5)**		SECN+	3,373	41–14	17–12
May 19	at Alabama	#4	Sewell-Thomas Stadium • Tuscaloosa, AL	10-8	**Holston (2-0)**	Cameron (1-3)		SECN+	3,991	42–14	18–12

Postseason (6–3)

SEC Tournament (4–1)
Date	Opponent	Seed/Rank	Site/stadium	Score	Win	Loss	Save	TV	Attendance	Overall record	SECT Record
May 23	vs. (7) Auburn	(2) #4	Hoover Metropolitan Stadium • Hoover, AL	3-9	Burns (6-4)	**Holston (2-1)**	Coker (7)	SECN	7,126	42–15	0–1
May 24	vs. (3) Georgia	(2) #4	Hoover Metropolitan Stadium • Hoover, AL	5-4	**Caracci (4-2)**	Schunk (2-2)		SECN		43–15	1–1
May 25	vs. (7) Auburn	(2) #4	Hoover Metropolitan Stadium • Hoover, AL	7-0	**McArthur (6-0)**	Mitchell (2-2)		SECN		44–15	2–1
May 26	vs. (11) Texas A&M	(2) #4	Hoover Metropolitan Stadium • Hoover, AL	2-1	**Fowler (7-0)**	Kilkenny (8-4)	**Ethridge (3)**	SECN		45–15	3–1
May 27	vs. (8) LSU	(2) #4	Hoover Metropolitan Stadium • Hoover, AL	9-1	**Rolison (9-4)**	Gilbert (3-5)		ESPN	14,126	46–15	4–1

NCAA Division I Oxford Regional (2–2)
Date	Opponent	Seed/Rank	Site/stadium	Score	Win	Loss	Save	TV	Attendance	Overall record	NCAAT record
June 2	(4) Saint Louis	(1) #4	Swayze Field • Oxford, MS	9-2	**Rolison (10-4)**	Hogan (10-4)		ESPN3	11,304	47–15	1–0
June 3	(2) #20 Tennessee Tech	(1) #4	Swayze Field • Oxford, MS	9-8	**Caracci (5-2)**	Provey (5-1)	**Roth (1)**	ESPN3	10,891	48–15	2–0
June 4 (1)	(2) #20 Tennessee Tech	(1) #4	Swayze Field • Oxford, MS	5-15	Roberts (6-1)	**McArthur (6-1)**		ESPN3	10,180	48–16	2–1
June 4 (2)	(2) #20 Tennessee Tech	(1) #4	Swayze Field • Oxford, MS	2-3	Osborne (2-0)	**Roth (5-1)**		ESPN3	10,062	48–17	2–2

Schedule source:

== Record vs. conference opponents ==
Last two do not qualify for conf. tourn. Blank are not scheduled. Blue are home games, otherwise away.

2018 SEC baseball records Source: 2018 SEC baseball game results
Team	W–L	ALA	ARK	AUB	FLA	UGA	KEN	LSU	MSU	MIZZ	MISS	SCAR	TENN	TAMU	VAN	Team	Div	SR	SW
ALA	8–22		0–3	0–3	.	1–2	2–1	1–2	1–2	2–1	1–2	.	0–3	0–3	.	ALA	W7	2–8	0–4
ARK	18–12	3–0		3–0	1–2	1–2	3–0	1–2	0–3	.	1–2	2–1	.	3–0	.	ARK	W2	5–5	4–1
AUB	15–15	3–0	0–3		1–2	.	1–2	2–1	2–1	1–2	0–3	.	.	2–1	3–0	AUB	W3	5–5	2–2
FLA	20–10	.	2–1	2–1		2–1	2–1	.	0–3	3–0	.	2–1	2–1	2–1	3–0	FLA	E1	9–1	2–1
UGA	18–12	2–1	2–1	.	1–2		1–2	.	.	3–0	1–2	3–0	2–1	2–1	1–2	UGA	E2	6–4	2–0
KEN	13–17	1–2	0–3	2–1	1–2	2–1		.	2–1	2–1	.	2–1	1–2	.	0–3	KEN	E5	5–5	0–2
LSU	15–15	2–1	2–1	1–2	.	.	.		2–1	2–1	1–2	0–3	3–0	1–2	1–2	LSU	W4	5–5	1–1
MSU	15–15	2–1	3–0	1–2	3–0	.	1–2	1–2		1–2	2–1	.	.	1–2	0–3	MSU	W5	4–6	2–1
MIZZ	12–18	1–2	.	2–1	0–3	0–3	1–2	1–2	2–1		.	1–2	2–1	.	2–1	MIZZ	E6	4–6	0–2
MISS	18–12	2–1	2–1	3–0	.	2–1	.	2–1	1–2	.		1–2	2–1	2–1	1–2	MISS	W1	7–3	1–0
SCAR	17–13	.	1–2	.	1–2	0–3	1–2	3–0	.	2–1	2–1		3–0	2–1	2–1	SCAR	E3	6–4	2–1
TENN	12–18	3–0	.	.	1–2	1–2	2–1	0–3	.	1–2	1–2	0–3		2–1	1–2	TENN	E7	3–7	1–2
TAMU	13–17	3–0	0–3	1–2	1–2	1–2	.	2–1	2–1	.	1–2	1–2	1–2		.	TAMU	W6	3–7	1–1
VAN	16–14	.	.	0–3	0–3	2–1	3–0	2–1	3–0	1–2	2–1	1–2	2–1	.		VAN	E4	6–4	2–2
Team	W–L	ALA	ARK	AUB	FLA	UGA	KEN	LSU	MSU	MIZZ	MISS	SCAR	TENN	TAMU	VAN	Team	Div	SR	SW

Updated for entire regular season.
