= Tristan Pompey =

Canadian baseball player (born 1997)

- Outfielder
- Born: March 23, 1997 (age 29); New Westminster, British Columbia, Canada
- Bats: Switch Throws: Right
- Stats at Baseball Reference
Medals
Men's baseball
Representing Canada
Pan American Games
Silver medal – second place	2019 Lima	Team

Tristan Gabriel Pompey (born March 23, 1997) is a Canadian former professional baseball outfielder. The Miami Marlins selected him in the third round of the 2018 Major League Baseball draft after his college baseball career for the Kentucky Wildcats.

== Career ==
=== Amateur career ===
Pompey played in the Tournament 12 showcase and for the Canadian national junior baseball team. He attended Jean Vanier Catholic Secondary School in Milton, Ontario, graduating in 2015, and committed to attend the University of Kentucky to play college baseball for the Kentucky Wildcats. The Minnesota Twins selected Pompey in the 31st round of the 2015 MLB draft, but he didn't sign. He enrolled at Kentucky. He was named All-Southeastern Conference in 2017, his sophomore year, and a Preseason All-American by Collegiate Baseball and Perfect Game in 2018. In 2017, he played collegiate summer baseball with the Wareham Gatemen of the Cape Cod Baseball League. He batted .335 in 2018, his junior year.

=== Miami Marlins ===
The Marlins selected Pompey in the third round, with the 89th overall selection, of the 2018 Major League Baseball draft. He signed with the Marlins, receiving a $645,000 signing bonus. The Marlins assigned him to the Gulf Coast League Marlins before promoting him to the Greensboro Grasshoppers of the Single-A South Atlantic League. After playing 24 games for Greensboro, the Marlins promoted Pompey to the Jupiter Hammerheads of the High-A Florida State League. In 52 total games between the two clubs, Pompey slashed .299/.408/.397 with three home runs, 23 RBIs, and ten stolen bases.

Pompey spent the 2019 season with Jupiter, batting .194 with 13 RBIs over 42 games. He did not play in a game in 2020 due to the cancellation of the minor league season because of the COVID-19 pandemic. In 2021, Pompey split the year between the Double-A Pensacola Blue Wahoos and Triple-A Jacksonville Jumbo Shrimp, hitting a combined .195/.314/.262 with one home run and 16 RBI in 56 total games.

On February 5, 2022, Pompey was suspended for 50 games for his second positive test for a "drug of abuse". The Marlins released Pompey on June 14.

=== Winnipeg Goldeyes ===
On June 21, 2022, Pompey signed with the Winnipeg Goldeyes of the American Association of Professional Baseball. He played in only 7 games for Winnipeg, hitting .318/.444/.364 with no home runs or RBI.

=== Québec Capitales ===
On July 5, 2022, Pompey was traded to the Québec Capitales of the Frontier League for a player to be named later. Pompey played in 46 games for Québec, batting .215/.356/.361 with four home runs and 13 RBI. On December 5, Pompey was released by the Capitales by having his contract option declined.

=== Guelph Royals ===
On March 6, 2023, Pompey signed with the Guelph Royals of the Intercounty Baseball League. In 19 games for the Royals, Pompey hit .246 with one home run, five RBI, and two stolen bases.

=== Lexington Legends ===
On April 24, 2024, Pompey signed with the Lexington Legends of the Atlantic League of Professional Baseball. In 27 games for Lexington, he batted .185/.293/.294 with two home runs, eight RBI, and one stolen base. Pompey became a free agent following the season.

== International career ==
He was selected Canada national baseball team at the 2015 U-18 Baseball World Cup, 2019 Pan American Games Qualifier. 2019 Pan American Games and 2019 WBSC Premier12.

== Personal life ==
Pompey's older brother is Dalton Pompey.
