= 2018 Kentucky Wildcats baseball team =

2018 season of University of Kentucky baseball team

2018 Kentucky Wildcats baseball
- Conference: Southeastern Conference
- Record: 34–22 (13–17 SEC)
- Head coach: Nick Mingione (2nd season)
- Assistant coaches: Jim Belanger (2nd season); Roland Fanning (2nd season); Todd Guilliams (2nd season)
- Home stadium: Cliff Hagan Stadium

2018 Southeastern Conference baseball standings
	Conf.				Overall
Team	W		L	PCT	W		L	PCT
East Division
No. 3 Florida ^{x}‍†‍‍^{y}	20	–	10	.667	49	–	21	.700
No. 20 Georgia ‍‍‍^{y}	18	–	12	.600	39	–	21	.650
No. 12 South Carolina ‍‍‍^{y}	17	–	13	.567	37	–	26	.587
No. 16 Vanderbilt ‍‍‍^{y}	16	–	14	.533	35	–	27	.565
Kentucky ‍‍‍	13	–	17	.433	34	–	22	.607
Missouri ‍‍‍	12	–	18	.400	34	–	22	.607
Tennessee ‍‍‍	12	–	18	.400	29	–	27	.518
West Division
No. 19 Ole Miss ^{x}‍‍‡‍^{y}	18	–	12	.600	48	–	18	.727
No. 2 Arkansas ^{x}‍‍‍^{y}	18	–	12	.600	48	–	21	.696
No. 15 Auburn ‍‍‍^{y}	15	–	15	.500	43	–	23	.652
LSU ‍‍‍^{y}	15	–	15	.500	39	–	27	.591
No. 4 Mississippi State ‍‍‍^{y}	15	–	15	.500	39	–	29	.574
Texas A&M ‍‍‍^{y}	13	–	17	.433	40	–	22	.645
Alabama ‍‍‍	8	–	22	.267	27	–	29	.482
x – Division champion † – Conference champion ‡ – Tournament champion y – Invited to the NCAA tournament Rankings from Collegiate Baseball

The 2018 Kentucky Wildcats baseball team represented the University of Kentucky during the 2018 NCAA Division I baseball season. The Wildcats were a member of the Southeastern Conference. They were led by head coach Nick Mingione, who was in his second year at Kentucky. The 2018 season marked the 50th and last season to play their home games at Cliff Hagan Stadium. The Wildcats opened their new stadium on Alumni Drive for the 2019 season.

== Roster ==
2018 Kentucky Wildcats roster
Pitchers: 12 – Alec Maley – Senior; 14 – Zack Thompson – Sophomore; 15 – Trip Lockhart – Freshman; 21 – Justin Lewis – (redshirt) Junior; 24 – Brett Marshall – (redshirt) Freshman; 30 – Sean Hjelle – Junior; 33 – Chris Machamer – Sophomore; 34 – Carson Coleman – (redshirt) Freshman; 37 – Cam Hill – Freshman; 38 – Jimmy Ramsey – Freshman; 39 – Zach Haake – Junior; 40 – Crosby Bringhurst – Freshman; 41 – Grant Macciocchi – Junior; 42 – Brad Schaenzer – Senior; 45 – Aaron McGeorge – Junior; 50 – Mason Hazelwood – Freshman; 54 – Daniel Harper – Freshman	Catchers: 8 – Marshall Gei – (redshirt) Junior; 13 – Kole Cottam – Junior; 16 – Troy Squires – (redshirt) Senior; 25 – Coltyn Kessler – Freshman; Infielders: 2 – Trey Dawson – Junior; 4 – Zeke Lewis – (redshirt) Sophomore; 5 – T.J. Collett – Sophomore; 10 – Luke Becker – Senior; 19 – Alex Rodriguez – Junior; 23 – Brayden Combs – (redshirt) Freshman; 26 – Luke Heyer – Senior	Outfielders: 6 – Tristan Pompey – Junior; 28 – Ryan Johnson – Junior; 44 – Ryan Shinn – Junior; 52 – Ben Aklinski – Junior

== Schedule ==
Legend
	Kentucky win
	Kentucky loss
	Postponement
**Bold**	Kentucky team member

2018 Kentucky Wildcats baseball game log
Regular season
February

Date	Opponent	Rank	Site/stadium	Score	Win	Loss	Save	Attendance	Overall record	SEC record
February 16	Wofford	8	Russell C. King Field • Spartanburg, SC	**W** 6–1	**Hjelle (1–0)**	Adams (0–1)	none	857	1–0	
February 17	USC Upstate	8	Cleveland S. Harley Baseball Park • Spartanburg, SC	**W** 6–5^{10}	**Hjelle (1–0)**	Adams (0–1)	none	157	2–0	
February 17	USC Upstate	8	Cleveland S. Harley Baseball Park • Spartanburg, SC	**W** 10–3	**Lewis (1–0)**	Van Der Weid (0–1)	none		3–0	
February 18	Evansville	8	Cleveland S. Harley Baseball Park • Spartanburg, SC	**W** 8–4	**McGeorge (1–0)**	Ellis (0–1)	none	145	4–0	
February 20	Xavier	8	Cliff Hagan Stadium • Lexington, KY	**L** 2–3^{10}	Schramm (1–0)	**Ramsey (0–1)**	none	4,118	4–1	
February 23	Oakland	8	Cliff Hagan Stadium • Lexington, KY	**W** 10–1	**Hjelle (2–0)**	Lee (0–2)	none	3,154	5–1	
February 24	Oakland	8	Cliff Hagan Stadium • Lexington, KY	**W** 17–6	**Thompson (1–0)**	Parr (0–1)	none	2,508	6–1	
February 25	Oakland	8	Cliff Hagan Stadium • Lexington, KY	**W** 15–6	**Lewis (2–0)**	Bowers (0–2)	none	2,909	7–1	
February 27	Western Kentucky	6	Cliff Hagan Stadium • Lexington, KY	**W** 4–3	**Haake (1–0)**	Morrison (0–1)	none	3,240	8–1	

March

Date	Opponent	Rank	Site/stadium	Score	Win	Loss	Save	Attendance	Overall record	SEC record
March 2	Houston	6	Minute Maid Park • Houston, TX; Shriners College Classic	**W** 14–2	**Hjelle (3–0)**	Cumbie (0–1)	none		9–1	
March 3	Sam Houston State	6	Minute Maid Park • Houston, TX; Shriners College Classic	**W** 7–2	**Thompson (2–0)**	Wesneski (1–1)	none		10–1	
March 4	Louisiana	6	Minute Maid Park • Houston, TX; Shriners College Classic	**W** 10–4	**Lewis (3–0)**	Perrin (0–3)	none		11–1	
March 6	Eastern Kentucky	6	Cliff Hagan Stadium • Lexington, KY	**W** 16–6	**Harper (1–0)**	Teague (1–1)	none	2,800	12–1	
March 7	Northern Kentucky	6	Cliff Hagan Stadium • Lexington, KY	**L** 6–8	Williams (1–1)	**Schaenzer (0–1)**	Martin (1)	2,342	12–2	
March 9	Texas Tech	6	Cliff Hagan Stadium • Lexington, KY	**W** 11–6	**Hjelle (4–0)**	Harpenau (1–1)	**Machamer (1)**	2,568	13–2	
March 10	Texas Tech	6	Cliff Hagan Stadium • Lexington, KY	**W** 10–7	**Maley (1–0)**	Haveman (0–1)	none	2,811	14–2	
March 11	Texas Tech	6	Cliff Hagan Stadium • Lexington, KY	**L** 3–5	Kilian (1–0)	**Lewis (3–1)**	Quezada (1)	2,643	14–3	
March 16	Arkansas	4	Baum Stadium • Fayetteville, AR	**L** 4–9	Reindl (1–1)	**Hjelle (4–1)**	Cronin (3)	8,751	14–4	0–1
March 17	Arkansas	4	Baum Stadium • Fayetteville, AR	**L** 2–14	Campbell (2–2)	**Lewis (3–2)**	none		14–5	0–2
March 17	Arkansas	4	Baum Stadium • Fayetteville, AR	**L** 9–16	Murphy (3–0)	**Harper (1–1)**	none	10,418	14–6	0–3
March 20	Xavier	6	J. Page Hayden Field • Cincinnati, OH	**W** 20–4	**Schaenzer (1–1)**	Zwack (0–4)	none	159	15–6	
March 23	Auburn	6	Cliff Hagan Stadium • Lexington, KY	**W** 5–4	**Ramsey (1–1)**	Coker (3–1)	none	3,158	16–6	1–3
March 24	Auburn	6	Cliff Hagan Stadium • Lexington, KY	**L** 3–4	Malczewski (3–0)	**Machamer (1–1)**	Coker (4)		16–7	1–4
March 25	Auburn	6	Cliff Hagan Stadium • Lexington, KY	**W** 13–3	**Lewis (4–2)**	Burns (2–3)	none	3,130	17–7	2–4
March 27	Miami	6	Cliff Hagan Stadium • Lexington, KY	**W** 13–7	**Harper (2–1)**	Wilson (0–1)	none	3,032	18–7	
March 30	Alabama	7	Sewell–Thomas Stadium • Tuscaloosa, AL	**L** 2–4	Finnerty (3–1)	**Hjelle (4–2)**	Medders (3)	4,421	18–8	2–5
March 31	Alabama	7	Sewell–Thomas Stadium • Tuscaloosa, AL	**L** 2–4	Duarte (3–0)	**Haake (1–1)**	Medders (4)	4,403	18–9	2–6

April

Date	Opponent	Rank	Site/stadium	Score	Win	Loss	Save	Attendance	Overall record	SEC record
April 1	Alabama	7	Sewell–Thomas Stadium • Tuscaloosa, AL	**W** 5–2	**Lewis (4–2)**	Guffey (1–1)	**Machamer (2)**	3,399	19–9	3–6
April 3	Louisville	9	Cliff Hagan Stadium • Lexington, KY	**W** 8–5	**Coleman (1–0)**	Thompson (1–3)	**Machamer (3)**	4,798	20–9	
April 6	South Carolina	9	Cliff Hagan Stadium • Lexington, KY	**W** 14–1	**Hjelle (5–2)**	Hill (3–3)	none	3,422	21–9	4–6
April 7	South Carolina	9	Cliff Hagan Stadium • Lexington, KY	**L** 1–15	Morris (6–2)	**Haake (1–2)**	Bridges (1)	2,642	21–10	4–7
April 8	South Carolina	9	Cliff Hagan Stadium • Lexington, KY	**W** 10–5	**Lewis (6–2)**	Chapman (1–4)	**Machamer (4)**	2,853	22–10	5–7
April 11	Western Carolina	8	Hennon Stadium • Cullowhee, NC	**W** 7–5	**Coleman (2–0)**	Therrian (0–3)	**Machamer (5)**	754	23–10	
April 13	Georgia	11	Foley Field • Athens, GA	**W** 6–4^{11}	**Machamer (2–1)**	Locey (6–1)	none	3,004	24–10	6–7
April 14	Georgia	11	Foley Field • Athens, GA	**L** 7–9	Hancock (4–2)	**Haake (1–3)**	Webb (2)		24–11	6–8
April 15	Georgia	11	Foley Field • Athens, GA	**W** 1–0	**Ramsey (2–1)**	Webb (1–4)	**Machamer (6)**	3,218	25–11	7–8
April 17	Louisville	6	Jim Patterson Stadium • Louisville, KY	**L** 2–8	Detmers (2–0)	**Harper (2–2)**	none	3,806	25–12	
April 19	Florida	6	Cliff Hagan Stadium • Lexington, KY	**L** 2–11	Singer (8–1)	**Hazelwood (0–1)**	none	3,646	25–13	7–9
April 20	Florida	6	Cliff Hagan Stadium • Lexington, KY	**L** 4–9	Kowar (7–1)	**Hjelle (5–3)**	none	4,174	25–14	7–10
April 21	Florida	6	Cliff Hagan Stadium • Lexington, KY	**W** 3–2	**Lewis (7–2)**	Dyson (5–3)	**Machamer (7)**	4,461	26–14	8–10
April 25	Morehead State	13	Cliff Hagan Stadium • Lexington, KY	**W** 7–1	**Coleman (3–0)**	Rogers (0–1)	none	2,835	27–14	
April 27	Missouri	13	Cliff Hagan Stadium • Lexington, KY	**W** 7–1	**Hjelle (6–3)**	Sikkema (3–4)	Machamer (8)	4,112	28–14	9–10
April 28	Missouri	13	Cliff Hagan Stadium • Lexington, KY	**L** 11–14	Plassmeyer (5–2)	**Haake (1–4)**	De Oca (1)	3,864	28–15	9–11
April 29	Missouri	13	Cliff Hagan Stadium • Lexington, KY	**W** 11–10	**Marshall (1–0)**	De Oca (5–3)	**Harper (1)**	3,499	29–15	10–11

May

Date	Opponent	Rank	Site/stadium	Score	Win	Loss	Save	Attendance	Overall record	SEC record
May 4	Tennessee	13	Lindsey Nelson Stadium • Knoxville, TN	**L** 2–6	Linginfelter (3–4)	**Hjelle (6–4)**	Crochet (1)	2,080	29–16	10–12
May 5	Tennessee	13	Lindsey Nelson Stadium • Knoxville, TN	**W** 10–3	**Haake (2–4)**	Hunley (6–2)	none	1,912	30–16	11–12
May 6	Tennessee	13	Lindsey Nelson Stadium • Knoxville, TN	**L** 3–5	Crochet (5–5)	**Lewis (7–3)**	Stallings (1)	2,324	30–17	11–13
May 8	Indiana	17	Bart Kaufman Field • Bloomington, IN	**W** 7–6	**Harper (3–2)**	Saalfrank (1–3)	**Machamer (9)**	2,882	31–17	
May 11	Mississippi State	17	Cliff Hagan Stadium • Lexington, KY	**W** 9–6	**Hjelle (7–4)**	Pilkington (2–6)	**Machamer (10)**	4,303	32–17	12–13
May 12	Mississippi State	17	Cliff Hagan Stadium • Lexington, KY	**W** 4–1	**Ramsey (3–1)**	France (3–3)	none	4,416	33–17	13–13
May 13	Mississippi State	17	Cliff Hagan Stadium • Lexington, KY	**L** 8–18	Billingsley (4–3)	**Schaenzer (1–2)**	none	4,096	33–18	13–14
May 15	Murray State	16	Brooks Stadium • Paducah, KY	**W** 14–2	**Hazelwood (1–1)**	Hayes (1–6)	none	1,056	34–18	
May 17	Vanderbilt	19	Hawkins Field • Nashville, TN	**L** 1–8	Fellows (6–4)	**Hjelle (7–5)**	none	3,018	34–19	13–15
May 18	Vanderbilt	19	Hawkins Field • Nashville, TN	**L** 1–5	King (1–3)	**Ramsey (3–2)**	none	2,894	34–20	13–16
May 19	Vanderbilt	19	Hawkins Field • Nashville, TN	**L** 6–9	Gillis (4–1)	**Hazelwood (1–2)**	Conger (1)	3,027	34–21	13–17

Postseason
SEC Tournament

Date	Opponent	Rank	Site/stadium	Score	Win	Loss	Save	Attendance	Overall record	SEC Tournament record
May 22	Auburn		Hoover Metropolitan Stadium • Hoover, AL	**L** 3–4	Greenhill (4–2)	**Thompson (2–1)**	none	5,514	34–21	0–1

== Record vs. conference opponents ==
Last two do not qualify for conf. tourn. Blank are not scheduled. Blue are home games, otherwise away.

2018 SEC baseball records Source: 2018 SEC baseball game results
Team	W–L	ALA	ARK	AUB	FLA	UGA	KEN	LSU	MSU	MIZZ	MISS	SCAR	TENN	TAMU	VAN	Team	Div	SR	SW
ALA	8–22		0–3	0–3	.	1–2	2–1	1–2	1–2	2–1	1–2	.	0–3	0–3	.	ALA	W7	2–8	0–4
ARK	18–12	3–0		3–0	1–2	1–2	3–0	1–2	0–3	.	1–2	2–1	.	3–0	.	ARK	W2	5–5	4–1
AUB	15–15	3–0	0–3		1–2	.	1–2	2–1	2–1	1–2	0–3	.	.	2–1	3–0	AUB	W3	5–5	2–2
FLA	20–10	.	2–1	2–1		2–1	2–1	.	0–3	3–0	.	2–1	2–1	2–1	3–0	FLA	E1	9–1	2–1
UGA	18–12	2–1	2–1	.	1–2		1–2	.	.	3–0	1–2	3–0	2–1	2–1	1–2	UGA	E2	6–4	2–0
KEN	13–17	1–2	0–3	2–1	1–2	2–1		.	2–1	2–1	.	2–1	1–2	.	0–3	KEN	E5	5–5	0–2
LSU	15–15	2–1	2–1	1–2	.	.	.		2–1	2–1	1–2	0–3	3–0	1–2	1–2	LSU	W4	5–5	1–1
MSU	15–15	2–1	3–0	1–2	3–0	.	1–2	1–2		1–2	2–1	.	.	1–2	0–3	MSU	W5	4–6	2–1
MIZZ	12–18	1–2	.	2–1	0–3	0–3	1–2	1–2	2–1		.	1–2	2–1	.	2–1	MIZZ	E6	4–6	0–2
MISS	18–12	2–1	2–1	3–0	.	2–1	.	2–1	1–2	.		1–2	2–1	2–1	1–2	MISS	W1	7–3	1–0
SCAR	17–13	.	1–2	.	1–2	0–3	1–2	3–0	.	2–1	2–1		3–0	2–1	2–1	SCAR	E3	6–4	2–1
TENN	12–18	3–0	.	.	1–2	1–2	2–1	0–3	.	1–2	1–2	0–3		2–1	1–2	TENN	E7	3–7	1–2
TAMU	13–17	3–0	0–3	1–2	1–2	1–2	.	2–1	2–1	.	1–2	1–2	1–2		.	TAMU	W6	3–7	1–1
VAN	16–14	.	.	0–3	0–3	2–1	3–0	2–1	3–0	1–2	2–1	1–2	2–1	.		VAN	E4	6–4	2–2
Team	W–L	ALA	ARK	AUB	FLA	UGA	KEN	LSU	MSU	MIZZ	MISS	SCAR	TENN	TAMU	VAN	Team	Div	SR	SW

Updated for entire regular season.
