= Mike Bianco =

American baseball coach (born 1967)

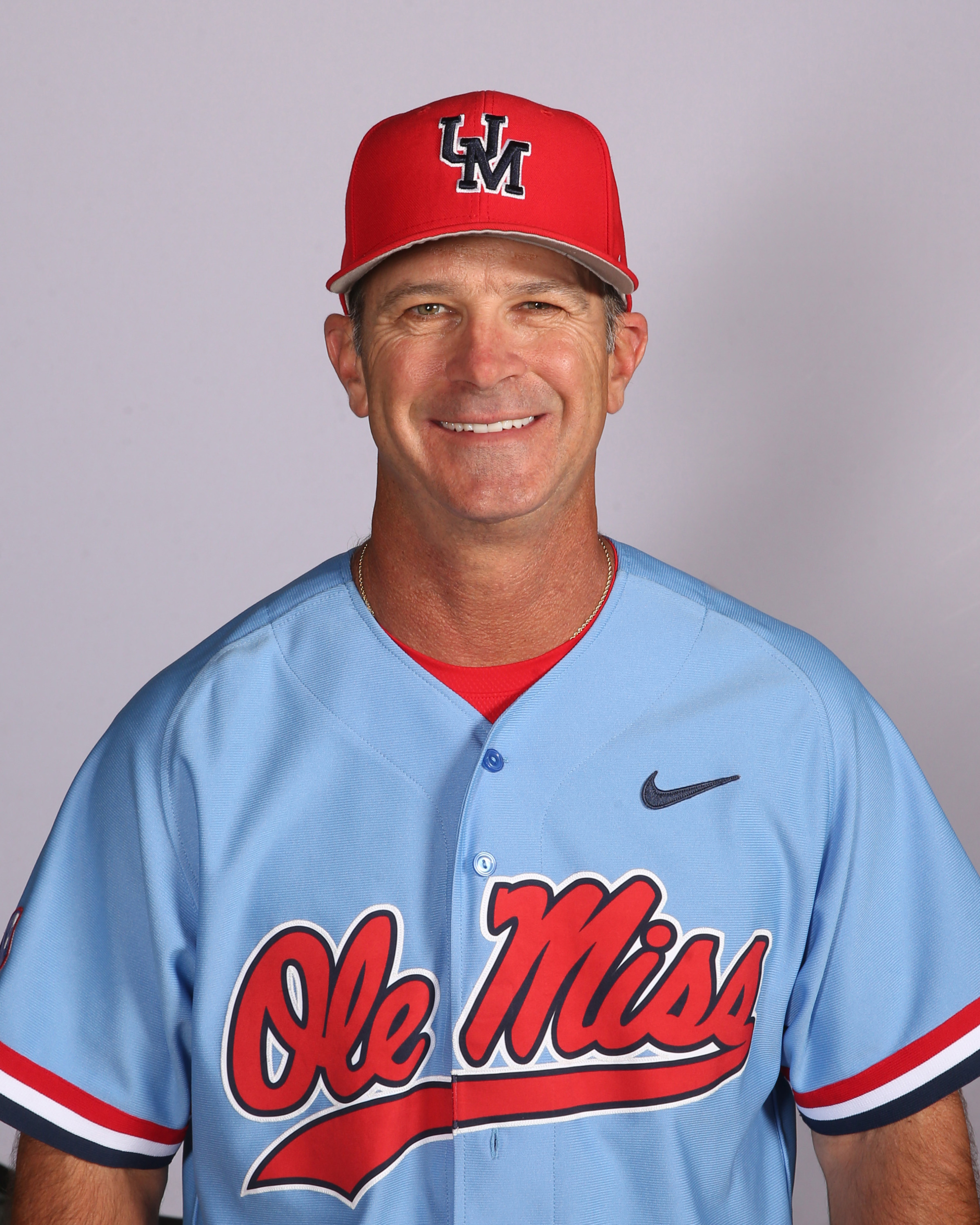

Current position
- Title: Head coach
- Team: Ole Miss
- Conference: SEC
- Record: 990–588–1 (.627)

Biographical details
- Born: May 3, 1967 (age 59); Wilmington, Delaware, U.S.

Playing career
- 1986–1987: Indian River CC
- 1988–1989: LSU
- Position: Catcher

Coaching career (HC unless noted)
- 1991–1992: Northwestern State (GA)
- 1993–1997: LSU (asst.)
- 1998–2000: McNeese State
- 2001–present: Ole Miss

Head coaching record
- Overall: 1,090–638–1 (.631)
- Tournaments: 52–43 (NCAA)

Accomplishments and honors

Championships
- College World Series (2022); 3× College World Series appearances (2014, 2022, 2026); SEC regular season (2009); 2× SEC Tournament (2006, 2018); 4× SEC West (2005, 2009, 2014, 2018); 9× NCAA Super Regionals (2005, 2006, 2007, 2009, 2014, 2019, 2021, 2022, 2026); Southland Conference regular season (2000)

Awards
- 2× Collegiate Baseball National Coach of the Year (2020, 2022); Seminole High School Hall of Fame; Indian River Community College Hall of Fame; All-Alex Box Omaha Era Team

Michael F. Bianco (born May 3, 1967) is an American college baseball coach and former catcher, who is the current head baseball coach of the Ole Miss Rebels. He played college baseball at Indian River Community College before transferring to LSU where he played for coach Skip Bertman from 1988 to 1989.

Bianco served as the head coach of the McNeese State Cowboys (1998–2000) before being named head coach at Ole Miss. He has led the Rebels to three College World Series appearances (2014, 2022, 2026) with Ole Miss winning their first national championship in 2022.

== Playing career ==
Bianco attended Seminole High School in Seminole, Florida where following the conclusion of a senior year, he was drafted in the 13th round of the 1985 Major League Baseball draft by the Boston Red Sox. Bianco played two seasons at Indian River Community College in Florida before transferring to LSU from 1988 to 1989. He was the Tigers' starting catcher and team captain on the 1989 team that finished third at the College World Series.

== Coaching career ==
On June 8, 2000, Bianco was named the head baseball coach of Ole Miss. During his tenure, Ole Miss has hosted nine NCAA baseball regionals and three NCAA baseball Super Regionals. The program has won four SEC Western Division Championships under his guidance (2005, 2009, 2014, 2018), the 2006 SEC Baseball Tournament, the 2018 SEC Baseball Tournament, the 2009 Southeastern Conference Co-championship, and eight NCAA regional championships (2005, 2006, 2007, 2009, 2014, 2019, 2021, 2022). In 2005, 2006, and 2009, his teams hosted Super Regionals.

Ole Miss reached the College World Series for the first time under Bianco in 2014, advancing to the semifinals. Eight years later at the 2022 College World Series, Bianco and the Rebels won their first national championship with a two-game sweep of Oklahoma.

== Head coaching record ==
Record table
Season	Team	Overall	Conference	Standing	Postseason
McNeese State Cowboys (Southland Conference) (1998–2000)
1998	McNeese State	30–26	13–10	3rd	
1999	McNeese State	31–25	12–15	8th	
2000	McNeese State	39–20	20–7	T–1st	NCAA Regional
McNeese State:		100–71 (.585)	45–32 (.584)		
Ole Miss Rebels (Southeastern Conference) (2001–present)
2001	Ole Miss	39–23–1	17–13	T–2nd (West)	NCAA Regional
2002	Ole Miss	37–19	14–16	6th (West)	
2003	Ole Miss	35–27	17–13	4th (West)	NCAA Regional
2004	Ole Miss	39–21	18–12	T–2nd (West)	NCAA Regional
2005	Ole Miss	48–20	18–12	T–1st (West)	NCAA Super Regional
2006	Ole Miss	44–22	17–13	3rd (West)	NCAA Super Regional
2007	Ole Miss	40–25	16–14	3rd (West)	NCAA Super Regional
2008	Ole Miss	39–26	15–15	3rd (West)	NCAA Regional
2009	Ole Miss	44–20	20–10	T–1st (West)	NCAA Super Regional
2010	Ole Miss	39–24	16–14	3rd (West)	NCAA Regional
2011	Ole Miss	30–25	13–17	T–5th (West)	
2012	Ole Miss	37–26	14–16	4th (West)	NCAA Regional
2013	Ole Miss	38–24	15–15	4th (West)	NCAA Regional
2014	Ole Miss	48–21	19–11	1st (West)	College World Series
2015	Ole Miss	30–28	15–14	4th (West)	NCAA Regional
2016	Ole Miss	43–19	18–12	4th (West)	NCAA Regional
2017	Ole Miss	32–25	14–16	6th (West)	
2018	Ole Miss	48–17	18–12	T–1st (West)	NCAA Regional
2019	Ole Miss	41–27	16–14	5th (West)	NCAA Super Regional
2020	Ole Miss	16–1 (Note: The season was not played past March 11 due to the COVID-19 pandemic in the United States.)	0–0		Season canceled due to COVID-19
2021	Ole Miss	45–22	18–12	3rd (West)	NCAA Super Regional
2022	Ole Miss	42–23	14–16	5th (West)	College World Series Champions
2023	Ole Miss	25–29	6–24	7th (West)	
2024	Ole Miss	27–29	11–19	6th (West)	
2025	Ole Miss	43–21	16–14	7th	NCAA Regional
2026	Ole Miss	41–23	15–15	T–9th	College World Series
Ole Miss:		990–588–1 (.627)	390–359 (.521)		
Total:		1,090–659–1 (.623)			
National champion Postseason invitational champion Conference regular season champion Conference regular season and conference tournament champion Division regular season champion Division regular season and conference tournament champion Conference tournament champion

== See also ==
- List of current NCAA Division I baseball coaches
