= 2018 TCU Horned Frogs baseball team =

American college baseball season

2018 TCU Horned Frogs baseball
- Conference: Big 12 Conference

Ranking
- Coaches: No. 12
- Record: 9–4 (0–0 Big 12)
- Head coach: Jim Schlossnagle (15th season)
- Assistant coaches: Bill Mosiello (5th season); Kirk Saarloos (6th season); Zach Etheredge (5th season)
- Home stadium: Lupton Stadium

2018 Big 12 Conference baseball standings
	Conf.						Overall
Team	W		L		T	PCT	W		L		T	PCT
No. 7 Texas ‍†‍‍^{y}	17	–	7	–	0	.708	42	–	23	–	0	.646
Oklahoma State ‍‍‍^{y}	16	–	8	–	0	.667	31	–	26	–	1	.543
No. 6 Texas Tech ‍‍‍^{y}	15	–	9	–	0	.625	45	–	20	–	0	.692
No. 24 Oklahoma ‍‍‍^{y}	14	–	10	–	0	.583	38	–	25	–	0	.603
Baylor ‍‍‡‍^{y}	13	–	11	–	0	.542	37	–	21	–	0	.638
TCU ‍‍‍	10	–	13	–	0	.435	33	–	23	–	0	.589
West Virginia ‍‍‍	9	–	15	–	0	.375	29	–	27	–	0	.518
Kansas ‍‍‍	8	–	15	–	0	.348	27	–	30	–	0	.474
Kansas State ‍‍‍	5	–	19	–	0	.208	23	–	31	–	0	.426
† – Conference champion ‡ – Tournament champion y – Invited to the NCAA tournament Rankings from Collegiate Baseball

The 2018 TCU Horned Frogs baseball team represented Texas Christian University during the 2018 NCAA Division I baseball season. The Horned Frogs played their home games at Charlie & Marie Lupton Baseball Stadium as a member of the Big 12 Conference. They were led by head coach Jim Schlossnagle, the winningest coach in TCU baseball history, in his 15th year at TCU.

== Previous season ==
The Horned Frogs entered the 2018 season on the heels of four consecutive trips to the College World Series. The 2017 TCU Horned Frogs baseball team entered the season as the unanimous preseason #1 team, and the favorite to win the Big 12 regular season championship. They notched a 39–14 (16–8) regular season record, and won a Big 12 Conference championship for the fourth-straight season, sharing the regular season co-championship with Texas Tech. In the postseason, the Horned Frogs advanced to the Big 12 tournament semifinals, before being eliminated by Texas. TCU was selected as the #6 National Seed the NCAA tournament, the Horned Frogs' highest-ever national seed. Star-first baseman/designated hitter Luken Baker was unavailable for the Tournament after a late-regular season injury. The Frogs coasted to a 3–0 record in the Fort Worth Regional, with wins over Central Connecticut, #11 Virginia, and #20 Dallas Baptist, and a 2–0 sweep of #8 Missouri State in the Fort Worth Super Regional to advance to the College World Series for the fourth-straight year. In Omaha, the Frogs fell in their opener to eventual-national champion, Florida, an 0–3 loss at the hands of Gator starting pitcher Alex Faedo. TCU then eliminated #8 Texas A&M and #4 Louisville to advance to a rematch with Florida in the national semifinals. The Frogs' win over the Aggies marked the third consecutive season, and the fourth in the past six seasons, that TCU eliminated Texas A&M from the NCAA tournament. The Frogs then beat #3 Florida 9–2 in the teams' first rematch before falling to the Gators in a decisive national semifinal game, again an 0–3 loss to Alex Faedo. The loss marked the third-straight year that TCU's season ended in the national semifinals. TCU finished the season ranked #4 in every final poll, with a 50–18 record (the Frogs' third 50-win season).

== Preseason ==
=== MLB draft ===
The following Horned Frogs on the 2016 roster were selected in the 2017 Major League Baseball draft:

List of Drafted Players
Name	2017 Class	Pos.	Team	Round	Signed/Returned
Austen Wade	Junior	OF	Cleveland Indians	5th	Signed
Evan Skoug	Junior	C	Chicago White Sox	7th	Signed
Brian Howard	Senior	RHP	Oakland Athletics	8th	Signed*
Mitchell Traver	Senior	RHP	Los Angeles Angels	20th	Signed*
Cam Warner	Senior	INF	Detroit Tigers	28th	Signed*
Elliott Barzilli	Senior	INF	Miami Marlins	32nd	Signed*

* indicates draftee had no more college eligibility

=== Departed Players ===
The following Horned Frogs on the 2017 roster departed the program prior to the 2018 season:

List of Departed Players
Name	2017 Class	Pos.	Reason
Elliott Barzilli	Senior	3B	Graduated, Drafted/Signed
Alec Creel	Freshman	RHP	Departed
Nolan Brown	RS Senior	CF	Graduated
Trent Franson	Sophomore	INF	Transferred to Houston Baptist
Mason Hesse	Senior	SS	Graduated
Dalton Horton	Sophomore	LHP	Transferred to Louisiana
Brian Howard	Senior	RHP	Graduated
Austin Ingraham	Junior	OF	Transferred to Texas A&M–Kingsville
Ryan Merrill	Senior	SS	Graduated
Evan Skoug	Junior	C	Drafted/Signed
Bryan Sturges	Freshman	U	Transferred to Howard College
Mitchell Traver	RS Senior	RHP	Graduated, Drafted/Signed
Austen Wade	Junior	RF	Drafted/Signed
Cam Warner	Senior	2B	Graduated, Drafted/Signed
Evan Williams	RS Senior	OF	Graduated

=== Recruiting class ===
The Horned Frogs added the following players to the roster as part of their 2017 recruiting class:

List of 2017 Recruits
Name	2018 Class	Pos.	Previous School	Hometown
A.J. Balta	SR	OF	Oregon	Valencia, CA
Coby Boulware	FR	INF	Boulder Creek H.S.	Anthem, AZ
Danny Crews	JR	INF	Fort Scot C.C.	Springfield, MO
Brad Czerniejewski	FR	OF	Lake Forest H.S.	Lake Forest, IL
Tristan Hanoian	FR	INF	Orange Lutheran H.S.	Costa Mesa, CA
R.J. Lan	FR	OF	La Mirada H.S.	La Mirada, CA
Augie Mihlbauer	FR	LHP	Mukwonago H.S.	Mukwonago, WI
James Notary	FR	RHP	Broomfield H.S.	Westminster, CO
Adam Oviedo	FR	INF	Alvarado H.S.	Grandview, TX
Colton Parrish	JR	C	Blinn College	La Vernia, TX
Johnny Rizer	JR	OF	Blinn College	Cypress, TX
Conner Shepherd	RS SO	INF	Mt. San Antonio College	Upland, CA
Caleb Sloan	FR	RHP	Regis Jesuit H.S.	Centennial, CO
Dylan Smith	JR	RHP	Weatherford College	Southlake, TX
Russell Smith	FR	LHP	Midlothian H.S.	Midlothian, TX

=== Season Projections ===
Coming off four-straight College World Series appearances in 2014, 2015, 2016, and 2017, returning anticipated starting pitchers Jared Janczak, Rex Hill and Nick Lodolo, and adding a highly ranked recruiting class, the 2018 Horned Frogs were projected as one of the "Eight for Omaha" in July 2017 by Baseball America, D1 Baseball, and Perfect Game.

The Horned Frogs were ranked in each major preseason poll and ranking. TCU was ranked #3 by Perfect Game, #4 in the USA Today Coaches Poll, #5 in the NCBWA Poll, #7 by D1 Baseball and Baseball America, and #9 by Collegiate Baseball.

Big 12 coaches predicted TCU would finish second in league play, with 4 of the 9 coaches picking TCU to finish in first place.

== Personnel ==
=== Coaching staff ===
TCU will return its entire coaching staff from the Frogs' 2014, 2015, 2016, and 2017 College World Series seasons. Pitching coach Kirk Saarloos, a California native, was reportedly courted by Stanford to replace 31-season head coach Mark Marquess, but Saarloos opted to remain at TCU.

Name	Position	Season at TCU	Alma mater
Jim Schlossnagle	Head coach	15	Elon University (1992)
Bill Mosiello	Associate head coach	5	Fresno State University (1986)
Kirk Saarloos	Assistant coach	6	California State University, Fullerton (2001)
Zach Etheredge	Volunteer Assistant Coach	5	University of Texas at San Antonio (2008)

=== Roster ===
The Horned Frogs' 2018 roster consists of 17 returners and 15 new players. Nearly half of the roster (15 of 32 players) are from outside the State of Texas. Sophomore catcher Zach Humphreys and freshman pitcher Russell Smith were high school teammates at Midlothian High School, and sophomore pitcher Cal Coughlin and freshman outfielder Brad Czerniejewski were high school teammates at Lake Forest High School in Illinois. Junior catcher Colton Parrish and junior outfielder Johnny Rizer were teammates at Blinn College before transferring to TCU prior to the 2018 season.

2018 TCU Horned Frogs baseball team
Players
Coaches

#	Pos.	Name	B/T	Height	Weight	Year	Previous school	Home town
1	INF	Coby Boulware	R/R	5 ft 9 in (1.75 m)	165 lb (75 kg)	Fr	Boulder Creek H.S.	Anthem, AZ
3	INF	Tristan Hanoian	L/R	5 ft 8 in (1.73 m)	180 lb (82 kg)	Fr	Orange Lutheran H.S.	Costa Mesa, CA
4	OF	Johnny Rizer	L/L	6 ft 0 in (1.83 m)	185 lb (84 kg)	Jr	Blinn College	Cypress, TX
5	INF	Adam Ovideo	R/R	6 ft 0 in (1.83 m)	205 lb (93 kg)	Fr	Alvarado H.S.	Grandview, TX
7	OF	Josh Watson	S/R	5 ft 11 in (1.8 m)	215 lb (98 kg)	Jr	Martin H.S.	Arlington, TX
8	INF	Danny Crews	L/R	6 ft 4 in (1.93 m)	175 lb (79 kg)	Jr	Fort Scott C.C.	Springfield, MO
9	INF	Conner Shepherd	L/R	6 ft 1 in (1.85 m)	205 lb (93 kg)	RS So	Mt. San Antonio College	Upland, CA
10	C	Zach Humphreys	R/R	5 ft 10 in (1.78 m)	185 lb (84 kg)	So	Midlothian H.S.	DeSoto, TX
11	OF	R.J. Lan	R/R	6 ft 0 in (1.83 m)	205 lb (93 kg)	Fr	La Mirada H.S.	La Mirada, CA
12	LHP	Nick Lodolo	L/L	6 ft 6 in (1.98 m)	185 lb (84 kg)	So	Damien H.S.	LaVerne, CA
13	INF	Michael Landestoy	R/R	6 ft 3 in (1.91 m)	210 lb (95 kg)	RS Sr	Saint George School	Santo Domingo, D.R.
15	RHP	Durbin Feltman	R/R	6 ft 0 in (1.83 m)	190 lb (86 kg)	Jr	Oak Ridge, H.S.	Conroe, TX
16	INF	Connor Wanhanen	L/R	6 ft 2 in (1.88 m)	195 lb (88 kg)	Sr	Flower Mound H.S.	Flower Mound, TX
17	C	Colton Parrish	L/R	5 ft 10 in (1.78 m)	185 lb (84 kg)	Jr	Blinn College	La Vernia, TX
19	INF	Luken Baker	R/R	6 ft 4 in (1.93 m)	265 lb (120 kg)	Jr	Oak Ridge, H.S.	Spring, TX
20	INF	Cal Coughlin	S/R	6 ft 1 in (1.85 m)	230 lb (104 kg)	So	Lake Forest H.S.	Lake Forest, IL
21	RHP	Charles King	R/R	6 ft 5 in (1.96 m)	205 lb (93 kg)	So	Coppell H.S.	Coppell, TX
23	LHP	Haylen Green	L/L	5 ft 11 in (1.8 m)	180 lb (82 kg)	So	Lufkin H.S.	Lufkin, TX
24	RHP	Jake Eissler	R/R	6 ft 1 in (1.85 m)	205 lb (93 kg)	So	Thunder Ridge H.S.	Littleton, CO
25	OF	Brad Czerniejewski	R/R	6 ft 2 in (1.88 m)	200 lb (91 kg)	Fr	Lake Forest H.S.	Lake Forest, IL
26	RHP	Sean Wymer	R/R	6 ft 1 in (1.85 m)	210 lb (95 kg)	Jr	Flower Mound H.S.	Flower Mound, TX
29	LHP	Augie Mihlbauer	L/L	6 ft 0 in (1.83 m)	190 lb (86 kg)	Fr	Mukwonago H.S.	Mukwonago, WI
31	RHP	Dalton Brown	R/R	6 ft 1 in (1.85 m)	204 lb (93 kg)	Jr	Arlington Heights H.S.	Benbrook, TX
32	RHP	James Notary	R/R	6 ft 3 in (1.91 m)	210 lb (95 kg)	Fr	Broomfield H.S.	Westminster, CO
33	LHP	Russell Smith	L/L	6 ft 9 in (2.06 m)	250 lb (113 kg)	Fr	Midlothian H.S.	Midlothian, TX
34	RHP	Trey Morris	R/R	6 ft 5 in (1.96 m)	207 lb (94 kg)	So	Taylor H.S.	Katy, TX
35	OF	A.J. Balta	L/R	5 ft 10 in (1.78 m)	190 lb (86 kg)	Sr	Oregon	Valencia, CA
37	RHP	Austin Boyles	R/R	6 ft 2 in (1.88 m)	187 lb (85 kg)	RS So	Klein Collins H.S.	Spring, TX
40	RHP	Dylan Smith	R/R	6 ft 3 in (1.91 m)	205 lb (93 kg)	Jr	Weatherford College	Southlake, TX
41	RHP	Jared Janczak	R/R	6 ft 1 in (1.85 m)	210 lb (95 kg)	RS Jr	Belton H.S.	Belton, TX
43	LHP	Dion Henderson	L/L	6 ft 4 in (1.93 m)	180 lb (82 kg)	RS Fr	Oak Park H.S.	Detroit, MI
44	RHP	Caleb Sloan	R/R	6 ft 3 in (1.91 m)	215 lb (98 kg)	Fr	Regis Jesuit H.S.	Centennial, CO

Head coach

Jim Schlossnagle

Assistant coach(es)

Bill Mosiello
Kirk Saarloos
Zach Etheredge

Legend

- (C) Team captain
- (S) Suspended
- (I) Ineligible
- Injured
- Current redshirt

Roster
Last update: February 8, 2018

== Schedule and results ==
2018 TCU Horned Frogs Baseball Schedule & Results
Regular season
February

Date	Time (CT)	TV	Opponent	Rank	Stadium	Score	Win	Loss	Save	Attendance	Overall	Big 12	
February 16	7:00 pm	ESPN3	at Grand Canyon*	#9	Brazell Stadium • Phoenix, AZ	**W** 3–2	**Coughlin** {1–0)	Vorhof (0–1)	**Feltman** (1)	3,479	1–0	–	Stats; Story
February 17	3:00 pm		at Grand Canyon*	#9	Brazell Stadium • Phoenix, AZ	**W** 14–6	**Lodolo** (1–0)	Lundin (0–1)	–	2,012	2–0	–	Stats; Story
February 18	2:00 pm		at Grand Canyon*	#9	Brazell Stadium • Phoenix, AZ	**L** 8–9^{12}	Smith (1–0)	**King** (0–1)	–	1,934	2–1	–	Stats; Story
February 24	2:00 pm		Long Beach State*	#9	Lupton Stadium • Fort Worth, TX	**L** 2–3	Baayoun (2–0)	**Janczak** (0–1)	Rivera (2)	4,120	2–2	–	Stats; Story
February 24	5:30 pm		Long Beach State*	#9	Lupton Stadium • Fort Worth, TX	**W** 8–3	**Lodolo** (2–0)	Castro (0–1)	**Notary** (1)	4,005	3–2	–	Stats; Story
February 25	1:00 pm	FSSW	Long Beach State*	#9	Lupton Stadium • Fort Worth, TX	**W** 5–2	**Green** (1–0)	Andrews (0–2)	**Feltman** (2)	4,343	4–2	–	Stats; Story

March

Date	Time (CT)	TV	Opponent	Rank	Stadium	Score	Win	Loss	Save	Attendance	Overall	Big 12	
March 1	6:30 pm		Texas–Arlington*	#12	Lupton Stadium • Fort Worth, TX	**W** 14–1^{7}	**Smith** (1–0)	Moffat (0–2)	–	4,013	5–2	–	Stats; Story
March 2	6:30 pm		UC Irvine*	#12	Lupton Stadium • Fort Worth, TX	**W** 4–3	**Eissler** (1–0)	Bocko (0–1)	–	4,639	6–2	–	Stats; Story
March 3	2:00 pm		UC Irvine*	#12	Lupton Stadium • Fort Worth, TX	**W** 6–2	**Lodolo** (3–0)	Raymond (1–1)	–	4,736	7–2	–	Stats; Story
March 4	1:00 pm	FSSW	UC Irvine*	#12	Lupton Stadium • Fort Worth, TX	**L** 2–15	Denholm (1–1)	**Smith** (1–1)	–	4,063	7–3	–	Stats; Story
March 6	6:30 pm		Texas–Rio Grande Valley*	#14	Lupton Stadium • Fort Worth, TX	**W** 7–2	**Eissler** (2–0)	Carreon (0–1)	–	4,021	8–3	–	Stats; Story
March 9	8:00 pm		at USC*	#14	Dedeaux Field • Los Angeles, CA	**W** 10–1	**Janczak** (1–1)	Clarke (1–3)	–	1,105	9–3	–	Stats; Story
March 11	12:30 pm		vs #10 Vanderbilt*	#14	Dodger Stadium • Los Angeles, CA	**L** 4–7					9–4	–	
March 13	6:30 pm		at Rice*		Reckling Park • Houston, TX							–	
March 16	6:30 pm		Minnesota*		Lupton Stadium • Fort Worth, TX							–	
March 17	5:00 pm		Minnesota*		Lupton Stadium • Fort Worth, TX							–	
March 18	12:30 pm	FSSW+	Minnesota*		Lupton Stadium • Fort Worth, TX							–	
March 20	6:30 pm		Arkansas–Pine Bluff*		Lupton Stadium • Fort Worth, TX							–	
March 23	6:30 pm		Kansas State		Lupton Stadium • Fort Worth, TX								
March 24	2:00 pm	FSSW	Kansas State		Lupton Stadium • Fort Worth, TX								
March 25	1:00 pm	FSSW+	Kansas State		Lupton Stadium • Fort Worth, TX								
March 27	6:30 pm		Dallas Baptist*		Lupton Stadium • Fort Worth, TX							–	
March 30	8:00 pm	ESPNU	at Oklahoma State		Allie P. Reynolds Stadium • Stillwater, OK								
March 31	6:00 pm	ESPNU	at Oklahoma State		Allie P. Reynolds Stadium • Stillwater, OK								

April

Date	Time (CT)	TV	Opponent	Rank	Stadium	Score	Win	Loss	Save	Attendance	Overall	Big 12
April 1	12:00 pm	FSSW	at Oklahoma State		Allie P. Reynolds Stadium • Stillwater, OK							
April 3	6:30 pm		at Dallas Baptist*		Horner Ballpark • Dallas, TX							–
April 6	6:30 pm		Oklahoma		Lupton Stadium • Fort Worth, TX							
April 7	7:00 pm	ESPNU	Oklahoma		Lupton Stadium • Fort Worth, TX							
April 8	1:00 pm		Oklahoma		Lupton Stadium • Fort Worth, TX							
April 10	6:30 pm		Texas–Arlington*		Lupton Stadium • Fort Worth, TX							–
April 13	6:00 pm	ESPN3	at Kansas		Hoglund Ballpark • Lawrence, KS							
April 14	2:00 pm	ESPN3	at Kansas		Hoglund Ballpark • Lawrence, KS							
April 15	1:00 pm	ESPN3	at Kansas		Hoglund Ballpark • Lawrence, KS							
April 17	6:30 pm		Abilene Christian*		Lupton Stadium • Fort Worth, TX							–
April 18	6:30 pm		at Texas–Arlington*		Clay Gould Ballpark • Arlington, TX							–
April 20	6:35 pm		at Baylor		Baylor Ballpark • Waco, TX							
April 21	3:05 pm		at Baylor		Baylor Ballpark • Waco, TX							
April 22	1:05 pm	FSSW+	at Baylor		Baylor Ballpark • Waco, TX							
April 24	6:30 pm		Stephen F. Austin*		Lupton Stadium • Fort Worth, TX							–
April 27	8:00 pm	FS1	Texas Tech		Lupton Stadium • Fort Worth, TX							
April 28	7:00 pm	ESPNU	Texas Tech		Lupton Stadium • Fort Worth, TX							
April 29	1:00 pm	ESPNU	Texas Tech		Lupton Stadium • Fort Worth, TX							

May

Date	Time (CT)	TV	Opponent	Rank	Stadium	Score	Win	Loss	Save	Attendance	Overall	Big 12
May 1	6:30 pm		at Abilene Christian*		Crutcher Scott Field • Abilene, TX							–
May 4	6:30 pm		Lamar*		Lupton Stadium • Fort Worth, TX							–
May 5	4:00 pm		Lamar*		Lupton Stadium • Fort Worth, TX							–
May 6	1:00 pm	FSSW+	Lamar*		Lupton Stadium • Fort Worth, TX							–
May 11	6:30 pm		West Virginia		Lupton Stadium • Fort Worth, TX							
May 12	4:00 pm	FSSW	West Virginia		Lupton Stadium • Fort Worth, TX							
May 13	1:00 pm		West Virginia		Lupton Stadium • Fort Worth, TX							
May 15	6:30 pm		at Stephen F. Austin*		Jaycees Field • Nacogdoches, TX							–
May 17	6:30 pm	FS1	at Texas		UFCU Disch-Falk Field • Austin, TX							
May 18	6:30 pm	LHN	at Texas		UFCU Disch-Falk Field • Austin, TX							
May 19	2:30 pm	LHN	at Texas		UFCU Disch-Falk Field • Austin, TX							

Postseason
Big 12 Tournament

Date	Time (CT)	TV	Opponent	Rank/Seed	Stadium	Score	Win	Loss	Save	Attendance	Overall	Big 12 Tourn.
					Chickasaw Bricktown Ballpark • Oklahoma City, OK							
					Chickasaw Bricktown Ballpark • Oklahoma City, OK							

NCAA tournament Regional

Date	Time (CT)	TV	Opponent	Rank/Seed	Stadium	Score	Win	Loss	Save	Attendance	Overall	Regional

Legend: = Win = Loss Bold = TCU team member
"#" represents ranking. All rankings from Collegiate Baseball on the date of the contest.
"()" represents postseason seeding in the Big 12 Tournament or NCAA Regional, respectively.

== Rankings ==
Ranking movements Legend: ██ Increase in ranking ██ Decrease in ranking
	Week																		
Poll	Pre	1	2	3	4	5	6	7	8	9	10	11	12	13	14	15	16	17	Final
Coaches'	4	4*	4*	12															
Baseball America	7	7	7	7															
Collegiate Baseball^	9	9	12	14															
NCBWA†	5	7	7	7															

^ Collegiate Baseball ranked 40 teams in their preseason poll, but only ranked 30 teams weekly during the season.
† NCBWA ranks 30 teams in their preseason poll, but only ranks 25 teams weekly during the season.
* A new poll was not released for this week, so for comparison purposes, the previous week's ranking is inserted in this week's slot.

== See also ==
- 2018 Big 12 Conference baseball tournament
- 2018 NCAA Division I baseball season
