= Padera Lake =

Lake in Texas

- Location within Texas
- Interactive map of Padera Lake
- Location: Midlothian, Texas
- Coordinates: 32.4985°N 97.0378°W
- Type: Reservoir
- Part of: Mountain Creek Watershed

Padera Lake is a fresh water reservoir located near Midlothian, Texas. The lake is situated along Highway 287.

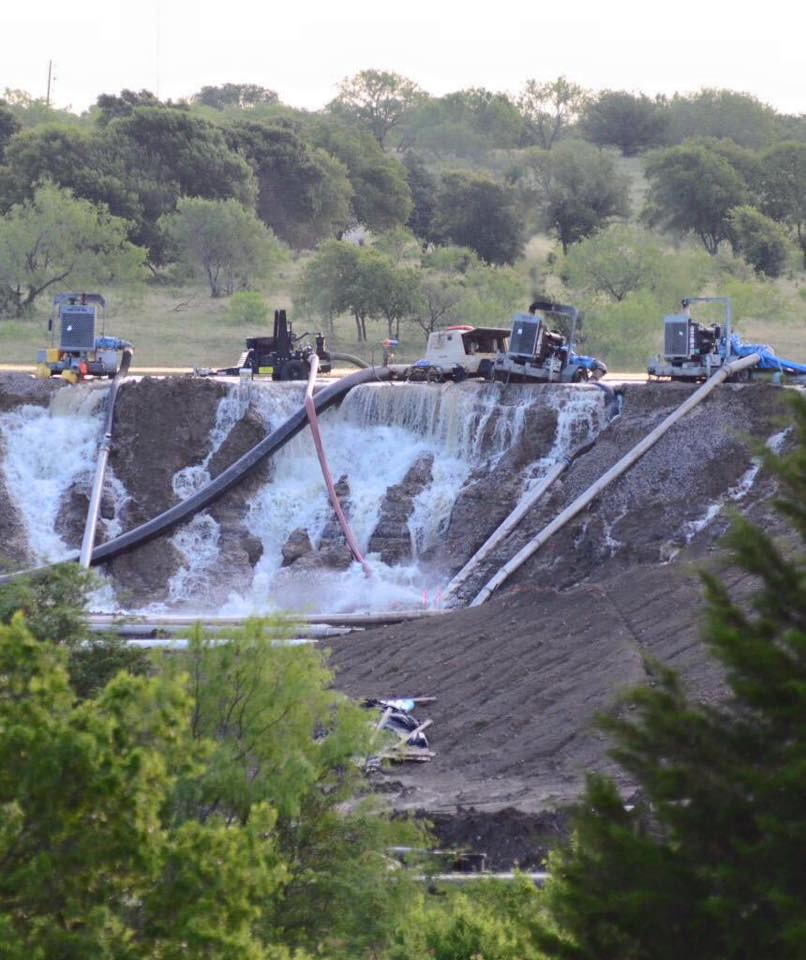
Water being pumped from Padera Lake in 2015

== 2015 flood ==
During heavy rainstorms in 2015, the reservoir came close to breaching its banks. Engineers constructed a Relief Dam which successfully prevented any damage.
