= Russell Smith (baseball) =

American baseball player (born 1998)

Free agent
- Born: September 10, 1998 (age 28); Midlothian, Texas, U.S.
- Bats: Left Throws: Left

Russell Lee Smith (born September 10, 1998) is an American professional baseball pitcher who is a free agent. He played college baseball for the Horned Frogs of Texas Christian University before the Milwaukee Brewers selected him in the second round of the 2021 Major League Baseball draft.

== Career ==
=== Amateur ===
Smith attended Midlothian High School in Midlothian, Texas. Drafted out of high school by the Chicago Cubs in the thirty-eighth round of the 2017 Major League Baseball draft, Smith opted instead to fulfill his committed to Texas Christian University. In 2018, he played collegiate summer baseball with the Newport Gulls of the New England Collegiate Baseball League. In 2021, he was named to the All-Big 12 Second Team.

=== Milwaukee Brewers ===
The Milwaukee Brewers selected him in the second round of the 2021 Major League Baseball draft with the fifty-first overall pick. Smith signed with the Brewers for a $1,000,000 signing bonus, $436,900 below slot value. Baseball America named him the Brewers' fourteenth best prospect in 2022. Smith made his professional debut in 2022 with the High–A Wisconsin Timber Rattlers, logging a 2–5 record and 4.87 ERA with 62 strikeouts across 15 starts.

Smith split the 2023 season between High–A Wisconsin and the Double–A Biloxi Shuckers, posting a cumulative 2—5 record and 4.80 ERA with 74 strikeouts in 54 1/3 innings pitched across 29 games (two starts). Smith returned to Biloxi in 2024, making 29 appearances primarily in relief, in which he compiled a 2–1 record and 2.73 ERA with 52 strikeouts.

Smith missed the entirety of the 2025 season due to an injury. After beginning the ensuing season on the injured list, Smith was released by the Brewers organization on August 22, 2026.

== Personal life ==
Smith has a son.
