= Mid-Way Regional Airport =

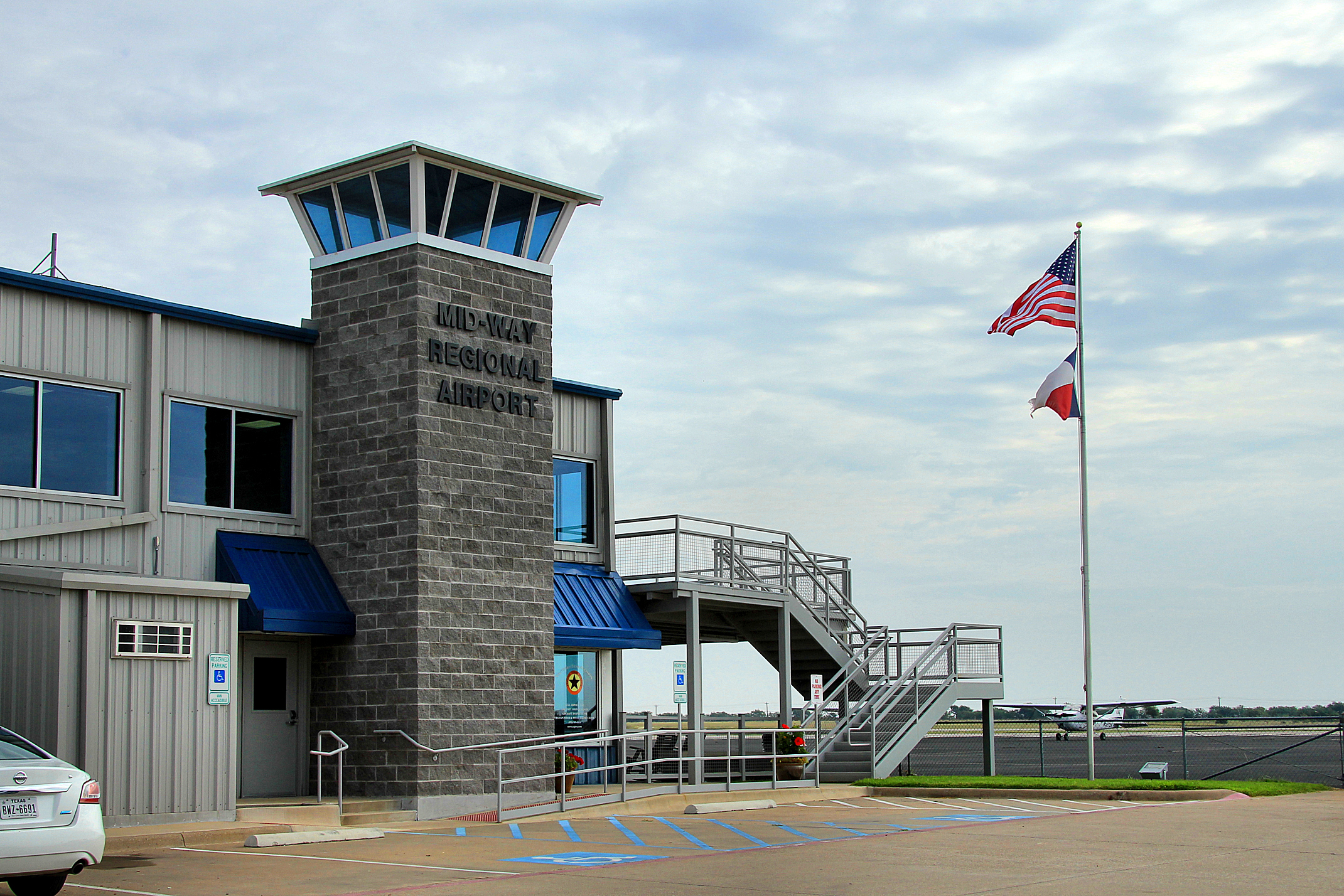
- IATA: none; ICAO: KJWY; FAA LID: JWY

Summary
- Airport type: Public
- Owner/Operator: Cities of Midlothian and Waxahachie
- Serves: Midlothian; Waxahachie
- Location: 131 Airport Drive, Midlothian, TX 76065
- Elevation AMSL: 727 ft / 222 m
- Coordinates: 32°27′30″N 096°54′45″W
- Website: http://www.mid-wayregional.com/

Map
- JWY

Runways
Direction	Length		Surface
Direction	ft	m	Surface
18/36	6,500	1,981	Asphalt

Statistics (2017)
- Aircraft operations: 49,700
- Based aircraft: 101
- Source: Federal Aviation Administration

Mid-Way Regional Airport (ICAO: KJWY, FAA LID: JWY) is a city-owned public airport that serves Midlothian and Waxahachie in Ellis County, Texas, United States. The airport is 5 nautical miles (9.3 km) southeast of the central business district of Midlothian.

Most U.S. airports use the same three-letter location identifier for the FAA and IATA, but Mid-Way Regional Airport is assigned JWY by the FAA and has no IATA designation.

== Facilities ==
Mid-Way Regional Airport covers 243 acres (98 ha) at an elevation of 727 feet (222 m) above mean sea level and has one runway:

- Runway 18/36: 6,500 x 100 ft. (1,981 x 30 m), Surface: Asphalt

For the year ending 31 October 2017, the airport had 49,700 aircraft operations, averaging 136 per day: 99% general aviation and less than 1% military. 101 aircraft were then based at this airport: 73% single-engine, 15% multi-engine, 7% gliders, 3% jet, 1% ultralights, and 1% helicopters.

== Accidents and incidents ==
- 30 July 2010: An American Champion 7GCBC Citabria, registration number N5027G, turned and struck the ground in a near-vertical nose-low attitude after departing for an instructional flight, killing the instructor pilot and student pilot. An autopsy of the instructor revealed severe atherosclerosis of the right coronary artery with superimposed fresh-recent thrombus, suggesting an acute myocardial infarction (heart attack). No signs of heart trouble could be found in the instructor's prior medical history. The accident was attributed to "The flight instructor’s incapacitation due to preexisting but unrecognized coronary disease, and the student pilot’s distraction and inability to recover the airplane from a stall/spin at low altitude."
- 8 April 2016: An American Champion 7GCBC Citabria, registration number N5046N, climbed sharply and stalled on takeoff, striking the ground in a left-wing-low, nose-down attitude. The student pilot in the front seat was killed and the instructor in the rear seat sustained minor injuries. The instructor claimed to have tried to push the control stick forward to prevent a stall, but the stick would not move, despite having operated freely during the pre-flight inspection. The accident was attributed to "The flight instructor's inability to move the control stick after takeoff for undetermined reasons, which resulted in an exceedance of the airplane's critical angle of attack an inadvertent aerodynamic stall. The reason for the inability to move the control stick could not be determined, because postaccident examination revealed no evidence of flight control malfunctions or anomalies that would have precluded normal operation."

== See also ==
- List of airports in Texas
