= 2018 Texas Tech Red Raiders baseball team =

American college baseball season

2018 Texas Tech Red Raiders baseball

NCAA Lubbock Regional champions NCAA Lubbock Super Regional champions

College World Series, 1–2
- Conference: Big 12 Conference

Ranking
- Coaches: No. 5
- CB: No. 6
- Record: 45–20 (15–9 Big 12)
- Head coach: Tim Tadlock (6th season)
- Assistant coaches: Ray Hayward (6th season); J-Bob Thomas (6th season); Matt Gardner (6th season)
- Home stadium: Dan Law Field at Rip Griffin Park

2018 Big 12 Conference baseball standings
	Conf.						Overall
Team	W		L		T	PCT	W		L		T	PCT
No. 7 Texas ‍†‍‍^{y}	17	–	7	–	0	.708	42	–	23	–	0	.646
Oklahoma State ‍‍‍^{y}	16	–	8	–	0	.667	31	–	26	–	1	.543
No. 6 Texas Tech ‍‍‍^{y}	15	–	9	–	0	.625	45	–	20	–	0	.692
No. 24 Oklahoma ‍‍‍^{y}	14	–	10	–	0	.583	38	–	25	–	0	.603
Baylor ‍‍‡‍^{y}	13	–	11	–	0	.542	37	–	21	–	0	.638
TCU ‍‍‍	10	–	13	–	0	.435	33	–	23	–	0	.589
West Virginia ‍‍‍	9	–	15	–	0	.375	29	–	27	–	0	.518
Kansas ‍‍‍	8	–	15	–	0	.348	27	–	30	–	0	.474
Kansas State ‍‍‍	5	–	19	–	0	.208	23	–	31	–	0	.426
† – Conference champion ‡ – Tournament champion y – Invited to the NCAA tournament Rankings from Collegiate Baseball

The 2018 Texas Tech Red Raiders baseball team represented Texas Tech University during the 2018 NCAA Division I baseball season. The Red Raiders played their home games at Dan Law Field at Rip Griffin Park as a member of the Big 12 Conference. The team was led by 6th year head coach Tim Tadlock.

== Previous season ==
The 2017 Texas Tech Red Raiders baseball team finished the regular season with a 42–13 (16–8) record and tied with TCU for first place in the Big 12 Conference standings. The Red Raiders were eliminated from the 2017 Big 12 Conference baseball tournament in game 3 after a 7–12 loss to West Virginia. Tech received a bid to the 2017 NCAA Division I baseball tournament, losing to Sam Houston State in games 3 and 4 of the regionals.

== Personnel ==
=== Roster ===
2018 Texas Tech Red Raiders roster
Pitchers: 12 – John Henry Gonzalez (RHP) – Sophomore; 14 – Jake McDonald (RHP) – Sophomore; 16 – Josh Jung (RHP) – Sophomore; 17 – John McMillon (RHP) – Sophomore; 21 – Erikson Lanning (LHP) – Junior; 23 – Connor Queen (RHP) – Sophomore; 28 – Ty Harpenau (RHP) – Junior; 29 – Clayton Beeter (RHP) – Freshman; 30 – Davis Martin (RHP) – Junior; 31 – Caleb Freeman (RHP) – Sophomore; 32 – Caleb Kilian (RHP) – Sophomore; 33 – Dane Haveman (LHP) – Sophomore; 34 – Ryan Shetter (RHP) – Junior; 37 – Andrew Davis (RHP) – Sophomore; 38 – Nick Candelari (RHP) – Freshman; 41 – Dylan Dusek (LHP) – Senior; 42 – Richard Gilbert (LHP) – Freshman; 45 – Jose Quezada (RHP) – Senior; 47 – Steven Gingery (LHP) – Junior; 49 – Ryan Sublette (RHP) – Freshman	Catchers: 19 – Clay Koezler – Sophomore; 26 – Braxton Fulord – Freshman; 35 - Zayne Willems – Junior; Infielders: 2 – Gabe Holt – Freshman; 3 – Micheal Davis – Senior; 4 – Grant Little – Sophomore; 5 – Brian Klein – Sophomore; 8 – Kurt Wilson – Freshman; 11 – Cameron Warren – Junior; 15 – Parker Kelley – Freshman; 16 – Josh Jung – Sophomore; 18 – Zach Rheams – Senior; 20 – KC Simonich – Freshman	Outfielders: 1 – Cody Farhat – Junior; 7 – Cody Masters – Freshman; 9 – Connor Beck – Senior; 11 – Cameron Warren – Junior; 17 – John McMillon – Sophomore; 20 – KC Simonich – Freshman

== Schedule and results ==
2018 Texas Tech Red Raiders baseball game log: 45–20 (Home 27–6; Away 15–10; Neutral 4–4)
Regular season: 38–15 (Home 22–5; Away 15–10; Neutral 1–0)

February: 9–0 (Home: 5–0; Away: 4–0)
Date	Time	Opponent	Rank	Site/stadium	Score	Win	Loss	Save	Attendance	Overall record	Big 12 Record	Ref
February 16	2:00 PM	Maine	#5	Dan Law Field at Rip Griffin Park • Lubbock, TX	4–2	**Martin** (1–0)	Courtney (0–1)	**Haveman** (1)	3,481	1–0	—	
February 17	12:00 PM	Maine	#5	Dan Law Field at Rip Griffin Park • Lubbock, TX	12–1	**Dusek** (1–0)	Emerson (0–1)	—	4,432	2–0	—	
February 17	3:05 PM	Maine	#5	Dan Law Field at Rip Griffin Park • Lubbock, TX	12–5	**McMillon** (1–0)	Silva (0–1)	—	4,432	3–0	—	
February 18	1:00 PM	Maine	#5	Dan Law Field at Rip Griffin Park • Lubbock, TX	21–6	**Quezada** (1–0)	Murphy (0–1)	—	3,788	4–0	—	
February 20	2:00 PM	New Mexico State	#5	Dan Law Field at Rip Griffin Park • Lubbock, TX	12–0	**Shetter** (1–0)	Whittlesey (0–1)	—	3,223	5–0	—	
February 24	8:00 PM	@ UTSA	#5	Wolff Stadium • San Antonio, TX	5–0	**Martin** (2–0)	Kirby (0–2)	—	1,384	6–0	—	
February 25	3:50 PM	@ UTSA	#5	Wolff Stadium • San Antonio, TX	3–0	**McMillon** (2–0)	Dressler (1–1)	**Freeman** (1)	1,131	7–0	—	
February 26	12:00 PM	@ UTSA	#4	Wolff Stadium • San Antonio, TX	10–6	**Queen** (1–0)	Wenzel (0–1)	**Haveman** (2)	307	8–0	—	
February 27	12:00 PM	@ UTRGV	#4	UTRGV Baseball Stadium • Edinburg, TX	3–1	**Shetter** (2–0)	Hill (1–1)	**Freeman** (2)	2,174	9–0	—	

March: 14–6 (Home: 10–1; Away: 4–5)
Date	Time	Opponent	Rank	Site/stadium	Score	Win	Loss	Save	Attendance	Overall record	Big 12 Record	Ref
March 2	6:30 PM	#11 South Alabama	#4	Dan Law Field at Rip Griffin Park • Lubbock, TX	8–1	**Martin** (3–0)	Carr (1–1)	—	4,432	10–0	—	
March 3	12:00 PM	#11 South Alabama	#4	Dan Law Field at Rip Griffin Park • Lubbock, TX	14–2	**McMillon** (3–0)	Greene (1–1)	—	4,432	11–0	—	
March 3	4:00 PM	#11 South Alabama	#4	Dan Law Field at Rip Griffin Park • Lubbock, TX	5–2	**Harpenau** (1–0)	Melton (0–1)	**Haveman** (3)	4,432	12–0	—	
March 4	1:00 PM	#11 South Alabama	#4	Dan Law Field at Rip Griffin Park • Lubbock, TX	9–7	**Quezada** (2–0)	Shell (0–2)	—	4,020	13–0	—	
March 7	1:00 PM	New Mexico	#4	Dan Law Field at Rip Griffin Park • Lubbock, TX	7–2	**Shetter** (3–0)	Garley (1–1)	—	3,526	14–0	—	
March 9	3:00 PM	@ #5 Kentucky	#4	Cliff Hagan Stadium • Lexington, KY	7–10	Hjelle (4–0)	**Harpenau** (1–1)	Machammer (1)	2,568	14–1	—	
March 10	12:00 PM	@ #5 Kentucky	#4	Cliff Hagan Stadium • Lexington, KY	6–11	Maley (1–0)	**Haveman** (0–1)	—	2,811	14–2	—	
March 11	12:00 PM	@ #5 Kentucky	#4	Cliff Hagan Stadium • Lexington, KY	5–3	**Kilian** (1–0)	Lewis (3–1)	**Quezada** (1)	2,643	15–2	—	
March 13	2:00 PM	@ #4 Louisville	#9	Jim Patterson Stadium • Louisville, KY	8–4	**Quezada** (3–0)	Hoeing (2–1)	—	1,965	16–2	—	
March 14	11:00 AM	@ #4 Louisville	#9	Jim Patterson Stadium • Louisville, KY	4–7	Miller (3–0)	**Sublette** (0–1)	Bordner (7)	1,185	16–3	—	
March 16	6:30 PM	@ Baylor	#9	Baylor Ballpark • Waco, TX	0–2	Bradford (3–1)	**Martin** (3–1)	Montemayor (5)	3,221	16–4	0–1	
March 17	2:00 PM	@ Baylor	#9	Baylor Ballpark • Waco, TX	2–12	Hill (2–0)	**Kilian** (1–1)	—	3,215	16–5	0–2	
March 18	1:00 PM	@ Baylor	#9	Baylor Ballpark • Waco, TX	11–4	**Harpenau** (2–1)	Thomas (0–1)	—	2,500	17–5	1–2	
March 23	6:30 PM	Northeastern	#17	Dan Law Field at Rip Griffin Park • Lubbock, TX	22–3	**Davis** (4–1)	Brown (1–2)	—	3,446	18–5	—	
March 24	12:00 PM	Northeastern	#17	Dan Law Field at Rip Griffin Park • Lubbock, TX	12–3	**Kilian** (2–1)	Christian (1–4)	—	3,442	19–5	—	
March 24	4:00 PM	Northeastern	#17	Dan Law Field at Rip Griffin Park • Lubbock, TX	13–2	**McMillon** (4–0)	Rodriguez (0–1)	—	3,948	20–5	—	
March 25	12:30 PM	Northeastern	#17	Dan Law Field at Rip Griffin Park • Lubbock, TX	9–4	**Harpenau** (3–1)	Mellen (5–1)	**Freeman** (3)	3,382	21–5	—	
March 27	3:00 PM	@ New Mexico State	#11	Presley Askew Field • Las Cruces, NM	**Game postponed to April 3**							
March 29	6:30 PM	West Virginia	#11	Dan Law Field at Rip Griffin Park • Lubbock, TX	0–1	Wolf (1–0)	**Martin** (4–2)	Ennis (1)	3,833	21–6	1–3	
March 30	6:30 PM	West Virginia	#11	Dan Law Field at Rip Griffin Park • Lubbock, TX	4–1	**Kilian** (3–1)	Manoah (1–4)	**Shetter** (1)	3,989	22–6	2–3	
March 31	2:00 PM	West Virginia	#11	Dan Law Field at Rip Griffin Park • Lubbock, TX	8–5	**Dusek** (2–0)	Ennis (3–2)	**Harpenau** (1)	4,432	23–6	3–3	

April: 10–6 (Home: 5–1; Away: 4–5; Neutral 1–0)
Date	Time	Opponent	Rank	Site/stadium	Score	Win	Loss	Save	Attendance	Overall record	Big 12 Record	Ref
April 3	7:00 PM	vs. New Mexico State	#12	Security Bank Ballpark • Midland, TX	2–1	**Wilson** (1–0)	Hroch (0–1)	—	4,474	24–6	—	
April 6	1:00 PM	@ Kansas	#12	Hoglund Ballpark • Lawrence, KS	15–6	**Martin** (5–2)	Davis (0–2)	—	768	25–6	4–3	
April 7	2:00 PM	@ Kansas	#12	Hoglund Ballpark • Lawrence, KS	10–0	**Kilian** (4–1)	Turski (1–5)	—	1,047	26–6	5–3	
April 8	1:00 PM	@ Kansas	#12	Hoglund Ballpark • Lawrence, KS	3–17	Zeferjahn (6–1)	**McMillon** (4–1)	—	630	26–7	5–4	
April 10	6:30 PM	@ Dallas Baptist	#14	Horner Ballpark • Dallas, TX	5–6	Hines (4–1)	**Quezada** (3–1)	—	1,509	26–8	—	
April 13	6:30 PM	Kansas State	#14	Dan Law Field at Rip Griffin Park • Lubbock, TX	21–4	**Martin** (6–2)	Heskett (2–5)	—	3,881	27–8	6–4	
April 14	2:00 PM	Kansas State	#14	Dan Law Field at Rip Griffin Park • Lubbock, TX	26–6	**Kilian** (5–1)	Littlejim (2–1)	—	4,432	28–8	7–4	
April 15	1:00 PM	Kansas State	#14	Dan Law Field at Rip Griffin Park • Lubbock, TX	9–6	**Dusek** (3–0)	Heinen (0–1)	**Harpenau** (2)	4,432	29–8	8–4	
April 17	2:00 PM	@ New Mexico	#15	Santa Ana Star Field • Albuquerque, NM	20–9	**Quezada** (4–1)	Coffey (0–1)	—	515	30–8	—	
April 20	2:00 PM	#14 Oklahoma	#15	Dan Law Field at Rip Griffin Park • Lubbock, TX	5–4	**Harpenau** (4–1)	Cavalli (2–2)	—	3,634	31–8	9–4	
April 21	2:00 PM	#14 Oklahoma	#15	Dan Law Field at Rip Griffin Park • Lubbock, TX	12–6	**Kilian** (6–1)	Perez (4–1)	—	4,432	32–8	10–4	
April 22	2:00 PM	#14 Oklahoma	#15	Dan Law Field at Rip Griffin Park • Lubbock, TX	5–12	Wiles (4–2)	**McMillon** (4–2)	—	4,432	32–9	10–5	
April 24	6:30 PM	@ #10 Arkansas	#11	Baum Stadium • Fayetteville, AR	1–5	Lee (3–2)	**Sublette** (0–2)	Loseke (1)	8,455	32–10	—	
April 25	6:00 PM	@ #10 Arkansas	#11	Baum Stadium • Fayetteville, AR	**Cancelled**							
April 27	8:00 PM	@ TCU	#11	Lupton Stadium • Fort Worth, TX	4–6	5,352	Wymer (3–3)	**Martin** (6–3)	Feltman (6)	32–11	10–6	
April 28	7:00 PM	@ TCU	#11	Lupton Stadium • Fort Worth, TX	6–0	6,302	**Kilian** (7–1)	King (1–2)	**Shetter** (3)	33–11	11–6	
April 29	1:00 PM	@ TCU	#11	Lupton Stadium • Fort Worth, TX	5–9	5,615	Eissler (3–1)	**Quezada** (4–2)	—	33–12	11–7	

May: 5–3 (Home: 2–3; Away: 3–0)
Date	Time	Opponent	Rank	Site/stadium	Score	Win	Loss	Save	Attendance	Overall record	Big 12 Record	Ref
May 1	2:00 PM	San Diego	#16	Dan Law Field at Rip Griffin Park • Lubbock, TX	11–6	**Freeman** (1–0)	Kuhn (3–1)	—	3,537	34–12	—	
May 4	6:30 PM	#18 Texas	#16	Dan Law Field at Rip Griffin Park • Lubbock, TX	6–12	Kinghham (6–2)	**Martin** (6–4)	—	4,432	34–13	11–8	
May 5	1:00 PM	#18 Texas	#16	Dan Law Field at Rip Griffin Park • Lubbock, TX	16–5	**Kilian** (8–1)	Shugart (4–3)	—	4,432	35–13	12–8	
May 6	2:00 PM	#18 Texas	#16	Dan Law Field at Rip Griffin Park • Lubbock, TX	5–7	Robinson (3–0)	**Harpenau** (4–2)	McGuire (7)	4,432	35–14	12–9	
May 8	6:30 PM	Dallas Baptist	#19	Dan Law Field at Rip Griffin Park • Lubbock, TX	4–10	Kechley (6–0)	**McMillon** (4–3)	—	4,264	35–15	—	
May 17	6:30 PM	@ #14 Oklahoma State	#19	Allie P. Reynolds Stadium • Stillwater, OK	9–4	**Shetter** (4–0)	Battenfield (2–2)	—	1,776	36–15	13–9	
May 18	6:30 PM	@ #14 Oklahoma State	#19	Allie P. Reynolds Stadium • Stillwater, OK	14–6	**Harpenau** (5–2)	Teel (7–3)	—	2,197	37–15	14–9	
May 19	1:00 PM	@ #14 Oklahoma State	#19	Allie P. Reynolds Stadium • Stillwater, OK	7–3	**McMillon** (5–3)	Heasley (3–6)	—	2,244	38–15	15–9	

Post–season: 7–5

Big 12 tournament: 1–2
Date	Time	Opponent	Rank	Site/stadium	Score	Win	Loss	Save	Attendance	Overall record	B12T Record	Ref
May 23	7:30 PM	vs. (6) TCU	#13 (3)	Chickasaw Bricktown Ballpark • Oklahoma City, OK	2–12 (7)	Lodolo (7–4)	**Sublette** (0–3)	—	4,631	38–16	0–1	
May 24	12:30 PM	vs. #20 (2) Oklahoma State	#13 (3)	Chickasaw Bricktown Ballpark • Oklahoma City, OK	6–2	**Harpenau** (6–2)	Teel (7–4)	**Quezada** (2)	4,020	39–16	1–1	
May 25	7:00 PM	vs. (7) West Virginia	#13 (3)	Chickasaw Bricktown Ballpark • Oklahoma City, OK	4–12	Kessler (4–0)	**Martin** (6–5)	—	7,583	39–17	1–2	

NCAA tournament: 5–1
Date	Time	Opponent	Rank	Site/stadium	Score	Win	Loss	Save	Attendance	Overall record	NCAA Tourn	Ref
June 1	1:00 PM	(4) New Mexico State	#13 (1)	Dan Law Field at Rip Griffin Park • Lubbock, TX	9–2	**Shetter** (5–0)	Groff (11–3)	—	4,341	40–17	1–0	
June 2	7:00 PM	(2) Louisville	#13 (1)	Dan Law Field at Rip Griffin Park • Lubbock, TX	10–4	**Kilian** (9–1)	Bennett (8–2)	**Harpenau** (3)	4,563	41–17	2–0	
June 3	6:00 PM	(2) Louisville	#13 (1)	Dan Law Field at Rip Griffin Park • Lubbock, TX	11–6	**Martin** (7–5)	Detmers (4–2)	—	4,628	42–17	3–0	
June 9	2:00 PM	Duke	#6	Dan Law Field at Rip Griffin Park • Lubbock, TX	6–4	**Quezada** (5–2)	Labosky (3–1)	**Harpenau** (4)	4,818	43–17	4–0	
June 10	5:00 PM	Duke	#6	Dan Law Field at Rip Griffin Park • Lubbock, TX	2–11	Stinson (5–1)	**Kilian** (9–2)	—	4,818	43–18	4–1	
June 11	3:00 PM	Duke	#6	Dan Law Field at Rip Griffin Park • Lubbock, TX	6–2	**Harpenau** (7–2)	Dockman (0–1)	—	4,474	44–18	5–1	

College World Series: 1–2
Date	Time	Opponent	Rank	Site/stadium	Score	Win	Loss	Save	Attendance	Overall record	CWS	Ref
June 17	6:00 PM	vs. #2 (1) Florida	#6 (9)	TD Ameritrade Park • Omaha, NE	6–3	**Shetter** (6–0)	Singer (12–2)	—	19,100	45–18	1–0	
June 20	2:30 PM	vs. #4 (5) Arkansas	#6 (9)	TD Ameritrade Park • Omaha, NE	4–7	Loseke (4–2)	**Martin** (7–6)	—	13,637	45–19	1–1	
June 21	7:00 PM	vs. #2 (1) Florida	#6 (9)	TD Ameritrade Park • Omaha, NE	6–9	Leftwich (5–5)	**Killian** (9–3)	Byrne (16)	24,806	45–20	1–2	

Legend: = Win = Loss = Postponement
Bold = Texas Tech team member

"#" represents ranking. All rankings from Collegiate Baseball on the date of the contest.
"()" represents postseason seeding in the Big 12 tournament or NCAA Regional, respectively.

== NCAA tournament ==
=== Lubbock Regional ===
June 1, 2018 1:04 pm (CDT) at Dan Law Field at Rip Griffin Park in Lubbock, Texas, 101 °F (38 °C), sunny
Team	1	2	3	4	5	6	7	8	9	R	H	E
(4) New Mexico State	0	0	1	0	0	0	0	1	0	2	8	0
(1) Texas Tech	3	0	2	0	0	0	4	0	X	9	11	0
WP: Ryan Shetter (5–0) LP: Jonathan Groff (11–3); Attendance: 4,341

June 2, 2018 7:04 pm (CDT) at Dan Law Field at Rip Griffin Park in Lubbock, Texas, 89 °F (32 °C), mostly sunny
Team	1	2	3	4	5	6	7	8	9	R	H	E
(2) Louisville	0	0	1	1	0	0	0	0	2	4	8	1
(1) Texas Tech	0	0	3	3	0	2	2	0	X	10	10	2
WP: Caleb Kilian (9–1) LP: Nick Bennett (8–2) Sv: Ty Harpenau (3); Attendance: 4,563

June 3, 2018 6:24 pm (CDT) at Dan Law Field at Rip Griffin Park in Lubbock, Texas, 86 °F (30 °C), partly cloudy
Team	1	2	3	4	5	6	7	8	9	R	H	E
(1) Texas Tech	4	1	0	0	0	0	0	1	0	11	14	1
(2) Louisville	0	0	0	0	1	1	1	3	0	6	13	3
WP: Davis Martin (7–5) LP: Reid Detmers (4–2); Attendance: 4,628

=== Lubbock Super Regional ===
June 9, 2018 2:05 pm (CDT) at Dan Law Field at Rip Griffin Park in Lubbock, Texas, 91 °F (33 °C), mostly cloudy
Team	1	2	3	4	5	6	7	8	9	R	H	E
Duke	0	1	0	0	2	0	1	0	0	4	8	1
#6 Texas Tech	0	0	0	0	2	1	1	2	X	6	11	0
WP: Jose Quezada (5–2) LP: Jack Labosky (3–1) Sv: Ty Harpenau (4); Attendance: 4,818

June 10, 2018 6:16 pm (CDT) at Dan Law Field at Rip Griffin Park in Lubbock, Texas, 86 °F (30 °C), mostly cloudy
Team	1	2	3	4	5	6	7	8	9	R	H	E
#6 Texas Tech	0	0	0	0	0	0	1	1	0	2	9	0
Duke	0	0	0	4	6	0	0	1	X	11	16	1
WP: Graeme Stinson (5–1) LP: Caleb Kilian (9–2); Attendance: 4,818

June 11, 2018 3:04 pm (CDT) at Dan Law Field at Rip Griffin Park in Lubbock, Texas, 96 °F (36 °C), sunny
Team	1	2	3	4	5	6	7	8	9	R	H	E
Duke	0	0	0	1	0	1	0	0	0	2	10	0
#6 Texas Tech	0	0	1	2	0	0	1	2	X	6	13	2
WP: Ty Harpenau (7–2) LP: Matt Dockman (0–1); Attendance: 4,474

== College World Series ==
=== First round ===
June 17, 2018 8:56 pm (CDT) at TD Ameritrade Park in Omaha, Nebraska, 86 °F (30 °C), clear
Team	1	2	3	4	5	6	7	8	9	R	H	E
(9) Texas Tech	0	0	0	1	2	2	0	0	1	6	12	1
(1) Florida	0	0	1	0	0	0	2	0	0	3	5	1
WP: Ryan Shetter (6–0) LP: Brady Singer (12–2); Attendance: 19,100

=== Second round ===
June 20, 2018 2:30 pm (CDT) at TD Ameritrade Park in Omaha, Nebraska, 71 °F (22 °C), cloudy
Team	1	2	3	4	5	6	7	8	9	R	H	E
(5) Arkansas	2	1	0	2	0	0	0	2	0	7	12	1
(9) Texas Tech	0	0	0	0	2	0	0	0	2	4	6	0
WP: Barrett Loseke (4–2) LP: Davis Martin (7–6); Attendance: 13,637

June 21, 2018 7:05 pm (CDT) at TD Ameritrade Park in Omaha, Nebraska, 74 °F (23 °C), partly cloudy
Team	1	2	3	4	5	6	7	8	9	R	H	E
(1) Florida	0	0	0	1	2	2	0	3	1	9	12	2
(9) Texas Tech	0	0	0	0	0	0	3	3	0	6	12	1
WP: Jack Leftwich (5–5) LP: Caleb Killian (9–3) Sv: Michael Byrne (16); Attendance: 24,806

== Rankings ==
Ranking movements Legend: ██ Increase in ranking ██ Decrease in ranking ( ) = First-place votes
	Week																		
Poll	Pre	1	2	3	4	5	6	7	8	9	10	11	12	13	14	15	16	17	Final
Coaches'	3 (1)	3 (1)*	3 (1)*	3	5	9	7	5	4	5	4	8	10	11	11	11	11	11	5
Baseball America	5	5	5	5	8	11	11	7	6	5	4	9	10	10	7	10	10	10	5
Collegiate Baseball^	5	5	4	4	9	17	11	12	14	15	11	16	19	19	13	13	6	6	6
NCBWA†	3	3	3	3	5	10	8	5	4	4	3	9	10	14	11	13	5	5	5

^ Collegiate Baseball ranked 40 teams in their preseason poll, but only ranked 30 teams weekly during the season.
† NCBWA ranks 30 teams in their preseason poll, but only ranks 25 teams weekly during the season.
* A new poll was not released for this week, so for comparison purposes, the previous week's ranking is inserted in this week's slot.
