= Midlothian High School (Texas) =

Location
- 923 S 9th St. Midlothian, Texas 76065-3636; United States

Information
- School type: Public High School
- Motto: Go 2 - Go Panthers
- Established: 1907
- School district: Midlothian Independent School District
- Principal: Christopher Cravey
- Teaching staff: 115.77 (on an FTE basis)
- Grades: 9–12
- Enrollment: 1,976 (2024–2025)
- Student to teacher ratio: 17.07
- Colors: Blue, black and white
- Athletics conference: UIL Class AAAAA
- Mascot: Panther/Lady Panther
- Newspaper: Midlothian Messenger
- Yearbook: Panther Scream
- Website: Midlothian High School

Midlothian High School is a public high school located in the city of Midlothian, Texas, and classified as a 5A school by the UIL. It is a part of the Midlothian Independent School District located in northwestern Ellis County and is the original high school in the district. A second school, Midlothian Heritage High School, opened in the district in 2014.

In 2015, the school was rated "Met Standard" by the Texas Education Agency.

== Athletics ==
The Midlothian Panthers compete in these sports -

Volleyball, Cross Country, Football, Basketball, Wrestling, Powerlifting, Soccer, Golf, Tennis, Track, Baseball, Softball, Lacrosse, Swimming

=== State titles ===
- Boys Soccer
  - 2024(5A)
- Boys Cross Country -
  - 1985 (3A), 1986 (4A)

=== State finalist ===
- Baseball -
  - 1982 (3A)
- Marching Band -
  - 1985 (3A)
  - 1984 (3A)
  - 1983 (3A)
  - 2026 (5A)

== Notable alumni ==
- Chris Kyle, American Navy SEAL Sniper. Author of American Sniper.
- Russell Smith, baseball pitcher in the Milwaukee Brewers organization
- Bryant Wesco, college football wide receiver for the Clemson Tigers
