= Midlothian Independent School District =

Administrative zone in Texas

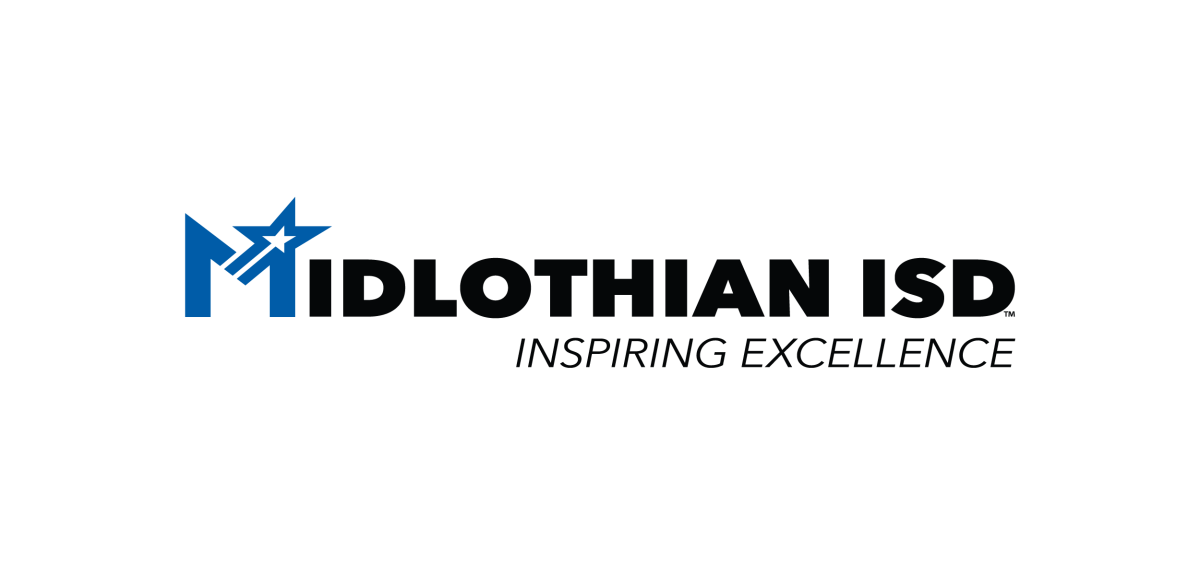

Location
- Midlothian, Texas, 76065; United States

District information
- Type: Public
- Motto: "Inspiring Excellence"
- Grades: Pre-K - 12
- Established: 1906
- Superintendent: Dr. David Belding
- NCES District ID: 4830600

Students and staff
- Enrollment: 10,990 (2020-21)
- Teachers: 683.60 (FTE)
- Student–teacher ratio: 16.08

Other information
- Website: misd.gs

Midlothian Independent School District is a public school district based in Midlothian, Texas, United States.

In addition to the majority of Midlothian, the district serves parts of Cedar Hill, Grand Prairie, Mansfield, Ovilla, Venus, and Waxahachie, as well as rural areas in northwestern Ellis County.

== 2015 TEA rating ==
In 2015, the district received the "Met Standard" rating by the Texas Education Agency. All 9 individual Midlothian ISD campuses also met the standard in 2015. Two new schools, Midlothian Heritage High School and McClatchey Elementary School, were not rated for 2015 as they were brand new schools at the time.

== Schools ==
=== High school (grades 9–12) ===
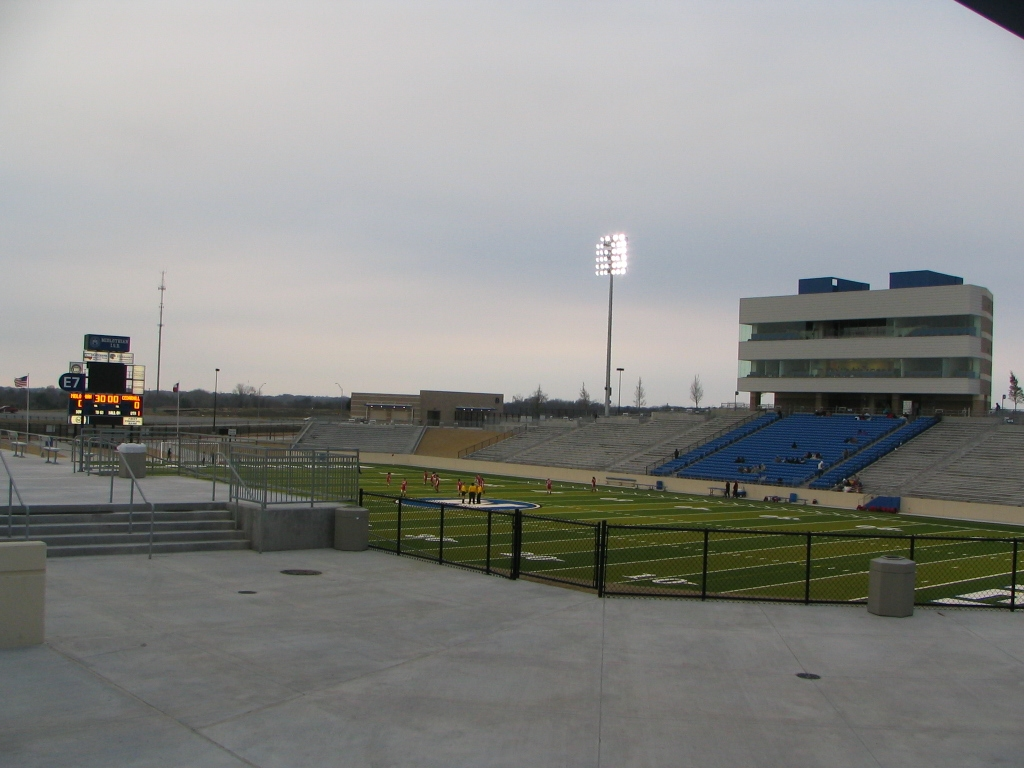
MISD Multi-Purpose Stadium

- Midlothian High School
- Midlothian Heritage High School

=== Middle schools (grades 6–8) ===
- Dieterich Middle School
- Frank Seale Middle School
- Walnut Grove Middle School

=== Elementary schools (grades PK–5) ===
- T.E. Baxter Elementary School
- J.R. Irvin Elementary School
- Longbranch Elementary School
- Dolores W McClatchey Elementary School
- LaRue Miller Elementary School
- Mt. Peak Elementary School
- J.A. Vitovsky Elementary School
- Jean Coleman Elementary School

== Colleges ==
Navarro College operates its Midlothian campus at the high school as well as having a small campus located in the town. This includes its partnership arrangement with Texas A&M-Commerce and most recently Tarleton State University.
