= 2018 Texas Longhorns baseball team =

American college baseball season

2018 Texas Longhorns baseball

Big 12 Regular season champions Austin Regional champions Austin Super Regional champions

College World Series, 0–2
- Conference: Big 12 Conference

Ranking
- Coaches: No. 7
- CB: No. 7
- Record: 42–23 (17–7 Big 12)
- Head coach: David Pierce (2nd season)
- Assistant coaches: Sean Allen (2nd season); Philip Miller (2nd season); Phil Haig (2nd season)
- Home stadium: UFCU Disch–Falk Field

2018 Big 12 Conference baseball standings
	Conf.						Overall
Team	W		L		T	PCT	W		L		T	PCT
No. 7 Texas ‍†‍‍^{y}	17	–	7	–	0	.708	42	–	23	–	0	.646
Oklahoma State ‍‍‍^{y}	16	–	8	–	0	.667	31	–	26	–	1	.543
No. 6 Texas Tech ‍‍‍^{y}	15	–	9	–	0	.625	45	–	20	–	0	.692
No. 24 Oklahoma ‍‍‍^{y}	14	–	10	–	0	.583	38	–	25	–	0	.603
Baylor ‍‍‡‍^{y}	13	–	11	–	0	.542	37	–	21	–	0	.638
TCU ‍‍‍	10	–	13	–	0	.435	33	–	23	–	0	.589
West Virginia ‍‍‍	9	–	15	–	0	.375	29	–	27	–	0	.518
Kansas ‍‍‍	8	–	15	–	0	.348	27	–	30	–	0	.474
Kansas State ‍‍‍	5	–	19	–	0	.208	23	–	31	–	0	.426
† – Conference champion ‡ – Tournament champion y – Invited to the NCAA tournament Rankings from Collegiate Baseball

The 2018 Texas Longhorns baseball team represented the University of Texas at Austin during the 2018 NCAA Division I baseball season. The Longhorns played their home games at UFCU Disch–Falk Field as a member of the Big 12 Conference. They were led by head coach David Pierce, in his second season at Texas.

The Longhorns claimed the Big 12 Conference regular season title, then swept the Austin Regional and won the Austin Super Regional to advance to the 2018 College World Series, extending their record for most appearances in Omaha to 36. The Longhorns had not reached the ultimate event in college baseball since 2014.

== Personnel ==
=== Roster ===
2018 Texas Longhorns roster
Pitchers: 8 - Kamron Fields - Freshman; 13 - Bryce Elder - Freshman; 14 - Beau Ridgeway - Junior; 17 - Nico O'Donnel - Freshman; 19 - Donny Diaz - (redshirt) Junior; 24 - Chase Shugart - Junior; 27 - Blair Henley - Sophomore; 30 - Josh Sawyer - (redshirt) Junior; 31 - Bennett Inoff - Freshman; 32 - Bryce Verplank - (redshirt) Sophomore; 33 - Matteo Bocchi - Junior; 34 - Cole Quintanilla - Freshman; 35 - Tristan Stevens - (redshirt) Freshman; 37 - Matthew Whelan - Freshman; 42 - Chris Fearon - Junior; 43 - Andy McGuire - (redshirt) Junior; 45 - Nolan Kingham - Junior; 46 - Brandon Ivey - Junior; 49 - Parker Joe Robinson - (redshirt) Junior; 50 - Michael Streitmann - Freshman; 51 - Jake McKenzie - Senior	Catchers: 6 - DJ Petrinsky - Junior; 29 - George Pappas - (redshirt) Junior; 36 - Turner Gauntt - Freshman; 40 - Michael McCann - (redshirt) Junior; Infielders: 1 - David Hamilton - Sophomore; 2 - Kody Clemens - Junior; 5 - Ryan Reynolds - Sophomore; 7 - Masen Hibbeler - Junior; 41 - Bryson Smith - Sophomore; 52 - Zach Zubia - (redshirt) Freshman; 55 - Sam Bertelson - Freshman	Outfielders: 4 - Tate Shaw - (redshirt) Junior; 11 - Duke Ellis - Sophomore; 44 - Austin Todd - Sophomore

=== Coaches ===
2018 Texas Longhorns coaching staff
- David Pierce – Head coach – 2nd year
- Sean Allen – Assistant coach – 2nd year
- Philip Miller – Assistant coach – 2nd year
- Phil Haig – Assistant coach – 2nd year

== Schedule and results ==
Legend
	Texas win
	Texas loss
**Bold**	Texas team member

2018 Texas Longhorns baseball game log
Regular season
February

Date	Opponent	Rank	Site/stadium	Score	Win	Loss	Save	Attendance	Overall Record	Big 12 Record
Feb 16	Louisiana*		UFCU Disch–Falk Field • Austin, TX	**W** 3–0	**Kingham (1–0)**	Burk (0–1)	**Ridgeway (1)**	5,195	1–0	
Feb 17	Louisiana*		UFCU Disch–Falk Field • Austin, TX	**W** 5–3	**Ridgeway (1–0)**	Moore (0–1)	None	5,330	2–0	
Feb 18	Louisiana*		UFCU Disch–Falk Field • Austin, TX	**L** 1–2	Batty (1–0)	**McGuire (0–1)**	Stoelke (1)	4,740	2–1	
Feb 21	Lamar*		UFCU Disch–Falk Field • Austin, TX	**W** 7–2	**Elder (1–0)**	Jones (0–1)	None	3,950	3–1	
Feb 23	at LSU*		Alex Box Stadium • Baton Rouge, LA	**L** 4–13	Hess (1–1)	**Kingham (1–1)**	None	11,102	3–2	
Feb 24	at LSU*		Alex Box Stadium • Baton Rouge, LA	**L** 10–5	Beck (1–0)	**Elder (1–1)**	None	12,038	3–3	
Feb 25	at LSU*		Alex Box Stadium • Baton Rouge, LA	**W** 11–1	**Henley (1–0)**	Peterson (0–2)	None	10,762	4–3	
Feb 27	UTSA*		UFCU Disch–Falk Field • Austin, TX	**W** 2–0	**O'Donnell (1–0)**	Rodriguez (0–1)	**Kingham (1)**	4,284	5–3	

March

Date	Opponent	Rank	Site/stadium	Score	Win	Loss	Save	Attendance	Overall Record	Big 12 Record
Mar 2	Northwestern*		UFCU Disch–Falk Field • Austin, TX	**L** 2–6	Fordon (1–0)	**Shugart (0–1)**	Bordignon (1)	5,082	5–4	
Mar 3	Northwestern*		UFCU Disch–Falk Field • Austin, TX	**W** 10–7	**Kingham (2–1)**	Christie (0–2)	**Ridgeway (2)**		6–4	
Mar 3	Northwestern*		UFCU Disch–Falk Field • Austin, TX	**W** 16–3	**Henley (2–0)**	Bader (1–2)	None	6,018	7–4	
Mar 4	Northwestern*		UFCU Disch–Falk Field • Austin, TX	**W** 12–1	**Elder (2–0)**	Katz (0–2)	None	4,395	8–4	
Mar 8	Stanford*		UFCU Disch–Falk Field • Austin, TX	**W** 8–6	**Elder (3–1)**	Weiermiller (3–1)	**Shugart (1)**	4,664	9–4	
Mar 9	Stanford*		UFCU Disch–Falk Field • Austin, TX	**L** 1–7	Bubic (3–0)	**Kingham (2–2)**	None	4,997	9–5	
Mar 10	Stanford*		UFCU Disch–Falk Field • Austin, TX	**L** 9–3	Weiermiller (4–1)	**Henley (2–1)**	Little (6)	6,349	9–6	
Mar 11	Stanford*		UFCU Disch–Falk Field • Austin, TX	**L** 1–11	Beck (2–0)	**Shugart (0–2)**	None		9–7	
Mar 13	at Arkansas*		Baum Stadium • Fayetteville, AR	**L** 4–13	Murphy (2–0)	**Ridgeway (1–1)**	Kostyshock (1)	8,051	9–8	
Mar 14	at Arkansas*		Baum Stadium • Fayetteville, AR	**L** 5–7	Bolden (2–0)	**O'Donnell (1–1)**	Cronin (2)	8,007	9–9	
Mar 16	Kansas		UFCU Disch–Falk Field • Austin, TX	**W** 14–4	**Kingham (3–2)**	Davis (0–1)	None	4,965	10–9	1–0
Mar 17	Kansas		UFCU Disch–Falk Field • Austin, TX	**W** 4–0	**Henley (3–1)**	Turski (1–3)	**Ridgeway (3)**	5,142	11–9	2–0
Mar 18	Kansas		UFCU Disch–Falk Field • Austin, TX	**W** 5–4	**Shugart (1–2)**	Zeferjahn (3–1)	**McGuire (1)**	4,649	12–9	3–0
Mar 20	Sam Houston State*		UFCU Disch–Falk Field • Austin, TX	**W** 3–2	**Bocchi (1–0)**	Mikolajchak (2–3)	**Kingham (2)**	4,394	13–9	
Mar 23	Oklahoma State		UFCU Disch–Falk Field • Austin, TX	**L** 1–6	Lienhard (2–1)	**Henley (3–2)**	None	4,983	13–10	3–1
Mar 24	Oklahoma State		UFCU Disch–Falk Field • Austin, TX	**W** 7–1	**Kingham (4–2)**	Heasley (2–2)	None	5,646	14–10	4–1
Mar 25	Oklahoma State		UFCU Disch–Falk Field • Austin, TX	**W** 10–5	**Elder (4–1)**	Teel (3–1)	None	5,049	15–10	5–1
Mar 27	at Texas State*		Bobcat Ballpark • San Marcos, TX	**W** 6–1	**O'Donnell (2–1)**	Engle (1–2)	None	2,547	16–10	
Mar 29	at Kansas State		Tointon Family Stadium • Manhattan, KS	**L** 2–5	Ford (4–1)	**Henley (3–3)**	Eckberg (1)	1,310	16–11	5–2
Mar 30	at Kansas State		Tointon Family Stadium • Manhattan, KS	**L** 10–11	Passino (1–0)	**Ridgeway (1–2)**	None	1,979	16–12	5–3
Mar 31	at Kansas State		Tointon Family Stadium • Manhattan, KS	**W** 9–5	**Shugart (2–2)**	Heskett (2–3)	**McGuire (2)**	1,479	17–12	6–3

April

Date	Opponent	Rank	Site/stadium	Score	Win	Loss	Save	Attendance	Overall Record	Big 12 Record
Apr 2	McNeese State*		UFCU Disch–Falk Field • Austin, TX	**W** 5–4	**Robinson (1–0)**	Briggs (0–1)	**McGuire (3)**	4,081	18–12	
Apr 3	at Texas A&M–Corpus Christi*		Whataburger Field • Corpus Christi, TX	**W** 9–3	**Henley (4–3)**	Perez (4–2)	None	4,115	19–12	
Apr 6	Baylor		UFCU Disch–Falk Field • Austin, TX	**W** 9–5	**Robinson (2–0)**	Kettler (3–3)	**Elder (1)**	5,391	20–12	7–3
Apr 7	Baylor		UFCU Disch–Falk Field • Austin, TX	**W** 2–0	**Shugart (3–2)**	Bradford (3–3)	**McGuire (4)**	5,587	21–12	8–3
Apr 8	Baylor		UFCU Disch–Falk Field • Austin, TX	**W** 4–1	**Henley (5–3)**	Leckich (2–2)	**Sawyer (1)**	5,125	22–12	9–3
Apr 10	at Texas A&M*		Olsen Field at Blue Bell Park • College Station, TX	**L** 5–6	Sherrod (2–1)	**O'Donnell (2–2)**	Hoffman (5)	7,537	22–13	
Apr 13	at Oklahoma		L. Dale Mitchell Baseball Park • Norman, OK	**W** 7–6	**Bocchi (2–0)**	Hansen (2–3)	**McGuire (5)**	2,331	23–13	10–3
Apr 14	at Oklahoma		L. Dale Mitchell Baseball Park • Norman, OK	**W** 5–3	**Kingman (5–2)**	Prater (2–2)	None	3,003	24–13	11–3
Apr 15	at Oklahoma		L. Dale Mitchell Baseball Park • Norman, OK	**L** 0–6	Wiles (3–2)	**Henley (5–4)**	None	1,227	24–14	11–4
Apr 17	Texas–Rio Grande Valley*		UFCU Disch–Falk Field • Austin, TX	**W** 13–2	**Bocchi (3–0)**	Quartier (0–1)	None	4,250	25–14	
Apr 18	vs Texas Southern*		Constellation Field • Sugar Land, TX	**W** 10–2	**O'Donnell (3–2)**	Furlong (1–5)	None		26–14	
Apr 20	New Orleans*		UFCU Disch–Falk Field • Austin, TX	**W** 8–6	**Sawyer (1–0)**	Barr (4–3)	**McGuire (6)**	4,953	27–14	
Apr 21	New Orleans*		UFCU Disch–Falk Field • Austin, TX	**W** 3–1	**Shugart (4–2)**	Smith (1–3)	**Elder (2)**	5,203	28–14	
Apr 22	New Orleans*		UFCU Disch–Falk Field • Austin, TX	**L** 1–4	Stephens (3–3)	**Henley (5–5)**	Martin (6)	5,300	28–15	
Apr 24	Houston*		UFCU Disch–Falk Field • Austin, TX	**W** 9–4	**Elder (5–1)**	Lockhard (1–1)	None	5,053	29–15	
Apr 27	at West Virginia		Monongalia County Ballpark • Granville, WV	**W** 11–6	**Whelan (1–0)**	Zarbinsky (2–3)	None	1,812	30–15	12–4
Apr 28	at West Virginia		Monongalia County Ballpark • Granville, WV	**L** 6–8	Manoah (3–5)	**McGuire (0–2)**	None	2,618	30–16	12–5
Apr 29	at West Virginia		Monongalia County Ballpark • Granville, WV	**L** 3–8	Kearns (3–1)	**Henley (5–6)**	None	2,033	30–17	12–6

May

Date	Opponent	Rank	Site/stadium	Score	Win	Loss	Save	Attendance	Overall Record	Big 12 Record
May 1	Texas State*		UFCU Disch–Falk Field • Austin, TX	**W** 11–10	**Fearon (1–0)**	Theriot (1–3)	None	4,696	31–17	
May 4	at Texas Tech		Dan Law Field at Rip Griffin Park • Lubbock, TX	**W** 12–6	**Kingham (6–2)**	Martin (6–4)	None	4,432	32–17	13–6
May 5	at Texas Tech		Dan Law Field at Rip Griffin Park • Lubbock, TX	**L** 5–16	Kilian (8–1)	**Shugart (4–3)**	None	4,432	32–18	13–7
May 6	at Texas Tech		Dan Law Field at Rip Griffin Park • Lubbock, TX	**W** 7–5	**Robinson (3–0)**	Harpenau (4–2)	**McGuire (7)**	4,432	33–18	14–7
May 15	Texas State*		UFCU Disch–Falk Field • Austin, TX	**W** 6–2	**Elder (6–1)**	Baird (2–2)	None	5,043	34–18	
May 17	TCU		UFCU Disch–Falk Field • Austin, TX	**W** 3–2	**Kingham (7–2)**	Lodolo (6–4)	None	5,515	35–18	15–7
May 18	TCU		UFCU Disch–Falk Field • Austin, TX	**W** 5–3	**McGuire (1–2)**	Mihlbauer (1–1)	None	6,779	36–18	16–7
May 19	TCU		UFCU Disch–Falk Field • Austin, TX	**W** 7–3	**Fields (1–0)**	Green (2–2)	None	7,294	37–18	17–7

Postseason
Big 12 Tournament

Date	Opponent	Rank	Site/stadium	Score	Win	Loss	Save	Attendance	Overall Record	Regional Record
May 23	Kansas		Chickasaw Bricktown Ballpark • Oklahoma City, OK	**L** 2–3	Goddard (5–1)	**Bocchi (3–1)**	Cyr (1)	4,208	37–19	0–1
May 24	Oklahoma		Chickasaw Bricktown Ballpark • Oklahoma City, OK	**L** 1–3	Prater (3–3)	**Kingham (7–3)**	Hansen (7)	3,803	37–20	0–2

NCAA Austin Regional

Date	Opponent	Rank	Site/stadium	Score	Win	Loss	Save	Attendance	Overall Record	Regional Record
June 1	Texas Southern		UFCU Disch–Falk Field • Austin, TX	**W** 10–0	**Shugart (5–3)**	Schneider (4–7)	**Bocchi (1)**	6,914	38–20	1–0
June 2	Texas A&M		UFCU Disch–Falk Field • Austin, TX	**W** 8–3	**Kingham (8–3)**	Kilkenny (8–5)	None	7,046	39–20	2–0
June 3	Indiana		UFCU Disch–Falk Field • Austin, TX	**W** 3–2	**Henley (6–6)**	Sommer (2–1)	**Shugart (2)**	6,855	40–20	3–0

NCAA Austin Super Regional

Date	Opponent	Rank	Site/stadium	Score	Win	Loss	Save	Attendance	Overall Record	Super Reg. Record
June 9	Tennessee Tech		UFCU Disch–Falk Field • Austin, TX	**L** 4–5	Evey (8–0)	**Kingham (8–4)**	Roberts (15)	7,062	40–21	0–1
June 10	Tennessee Tech		UFCU Disch–Falk Field • Austin, TX	**W** 4–2	**Shugart (6–3)**	Moths (13–3)	**Henley (1)**	7,151	41–21	1–1
June 11	Tennessee Tech		UFCU Disch–Falk Field • Austin, TX	**W** 5–2	**Bocchi (4–1)**	Hursey (8–5)	**Kingham (3)**	7,370	42–21	2–1

College World Series

Date	Opponent	Rank	Site/stadium	Score	Win	Loss	Save	Attendance	Overall Record	CWS Record
June 17	Arkansas		TD Ameritrade Park • Omaha, NE	**L** 5–11	**Knight (13–0)**	**Kingham (8–5)**		23,034	42–22	0–1
June 19	Florida		TD Ameritrade Park • Omaha, NE	**L** 1–6	**Kowar (10–5)**	**Henley (6–7)**		16,620	42–23	0–2

== Rankings ==
Ranking movements Legend: ██ Increase in ranking ██ Decrease in ranking — = Not ranked
	Week																		
Poll	Pre	1	2	3	4	5	6	7	8	9	10	11	12	13	14	15	16	17	Final
Coaches'	20	20*	20	20	—					23	21	24	18	16	13	16	16*	16*	7
Baseball America	14	14	17	17	—				24	20	19	20	17	15	14	14	14*	14*	7
Collegiate Baseball^	26	19	27	28	—				17	22	23	18	16	16	12	12	5	5	7
NCBWA†	21	19	21	20	29	—			27	23	19	20	17	18	13	18	8	8*	7

^ Collegiate Baseball ranked 40 teams in their preseason poll, but only ranked 30 teams weekly during the season.
† NCBWA ranks 30 teams in their preseason poll, but only ranks 25 teams weekly during the season.
* A new poll was not released for this week, so for comparison purposes, the previous week's ranking is inserted in this week's slot.
