= 2018 Big 12 Conference baseball tournament =

American college baseball tournament

- Teams: 8
- Format: Double-elimination tournament
- Finals site: Chickasaw Bricktown Ballpark; Oklahoma City, OK
- Champions: Baylor (1st title)
- Television: Bracket Play: FCS Central; Championship: FSN

2018 Big 12 Conference baseball standings
	Conf.						Overall
Team	W		L		T	PCT	W		L		T	PCT
No. 7 Texas ‍†‍‍^{y}	17	–	7	–	0	.708	42	–	23	–	0	.646
Oklahoma State ‍‍‍^{y}	16	–	8	–	0	.667	31	–	26	–	1	.543
No. 6 Texas Tech ‍‍‍^{y}	15	–	9	–	0	.625	45	–	20	–	0	.692
No. 24 Oklahoma ‍‍‍^{y}	14	–	10	–	0	.583	38	–	25	–	0	.603
Baylor ‍‍‡‍^{y}	13	–	11	–	0	.542	37	–	21	–	0	.638
TCU ‍‍‍	10	–	13	–	0	.435	33	–	23	–	0	.589
West Virginia ‍‍‍	9	–	15	–	0	.375	29	–	27	–	0	.518
Kansas ‍‍‍	8	–	15	–	0	.348	27	–	30	–	0	.474
Kansas State ‍‍‍	5	–	19	–	0	.208	23	–	31	–	0	.426
† – Conference champion ‡ – Tournament champion y – Invited to the NCAA tournament Rankings from Collegiate Baseball

The 2018 Big 12 Conference baseball tournament was held from May 23 through 27 at Chickasaw Bricktown Ballpark in Oklahoma City, Oklahoma. The annual tournament determines the conference champion of the Division I Big 12 Conference for college baseball. The winner of the tournament will earn the league's automatic bid to the 2018 NCAA Division I baseball tournament.

The tournament has been held since 1997, the inaugural year of the Big 12 Conference. Among current league members, Texas won the most championships with five. Among original members, Baylor and Kansas State have never won the event. Iowa State discontinued their program after the 2001 season without having won a title. Having joined in 2013, TCU won their first title in 2014 while West Virginia has yet to win the Tournament.

== Format and seeding ==
The top eight finishers from the regular season were seeded one through eight, and played a two-bracket double-elimination tournament leading to a winner-take-all championship game.

Place	Seed	Team	Conference					Overall			
Place	Seed	Team	W	L	T	%	GB	W	L	T	%
1	1	Texas	17	7	0	.708	–	42	23	0	.646
2	2	Oklahoma State	16	8	0	.667	1	31	26	1	.543
3	3	Texas Tech	15	9	0	.625	2	45	20	0	.692
4	4	Oklahoma	14	10	0	.583	3	38	25	0	.603
5	5	Baylor	13	11	0	.542	4	37	21	0	.638
6	6	TCU	10	13	0	.435	6.5	33	23	0	.589
7	7	West Virginia	9	15	0	.375	8	29	27	0	.518
8	8	Kansas	8	15	0	.348	8.5	27	30	0	.474
9	–	Kansas State	5	19	0	.208	12	23	31	0	.426

== Results ==
First round
1	Texas	2
8	Kansas	3
4	Oklahoma	0
5	Baylor	4
4	Oklahoma	3
1	Texas	1
3	Texas Tech	2
6	TCU	12^{7}
2	Oklahoma State	5
7	West Virginia	8
2	Oklahoma State	2
3	Texas Tech	6

Second round
8	Kansas	5
5	Baylor	10
8	Kansas	2
4	Oklahoma	4
6	TCU	8
7	West Virginia	1
7	West Virginia	12
3	Texas Tech	4

Semifinals
5	Baylor	10	–
4	Oklahoma	3	–
6	TCU	7	–
7	West Virginia	3	–

Finals
5	Baylor	6
6	TCU	5_{11}

== All-Tournament Team ==
Position	Player	School
C	Shea Langeliers	Baylor
1B	Cameron Warren	Texas Tech
2B	Kyle Gray	West Virginia
SS	Nick Loftin	Baylor
3B	Davis Wendzel	Baylor
OF	A.J. Balta	TCU
OF	Darius Hill	West Virginia
OF	Johnny Rizer	TCU
DH	Richard Cunningham	Baylor
SP	Cody Bradford	Baylor
SP	Sean Wymer	TCU
RP	Jake Eissler	TCU
MOP	Shea Langeliers	Baylor
