= Midlothian Heritage High School =

School in Midlothian, Texas, United States

Coordinates: 32.4847°N 96.9441°W

Location
- 4000 Farm to Market Road 1387; Midlothian, (Ellis County), Texas 76065; United States

Information
- Type: Public high school
- Established: 2014; 12 years ago
- Principal: Ketura Madison
- Staff: 89.78 (FTE)
- Grades: 9-12
- Enrollment: 1,760 (2024-2025)
- Student to teacher ratio: 19.60
- Colors: Red and blue
- Nickname: Jaguars
- Website: Midlothian Heritage High School

Midlothian Heritage High School is a comprehensive public high school in Midlothian, Texas, and a part of the Midlothian Independent School District.

Its attendance boundary includes: portions of Cedar Hill and Ovilla.

The school opened in 2014. The first 12th grade class graduated in 2017.

State Titles Girls Soccer 4AAAA 2017-2018
