= Midlothian, Texas =

- City
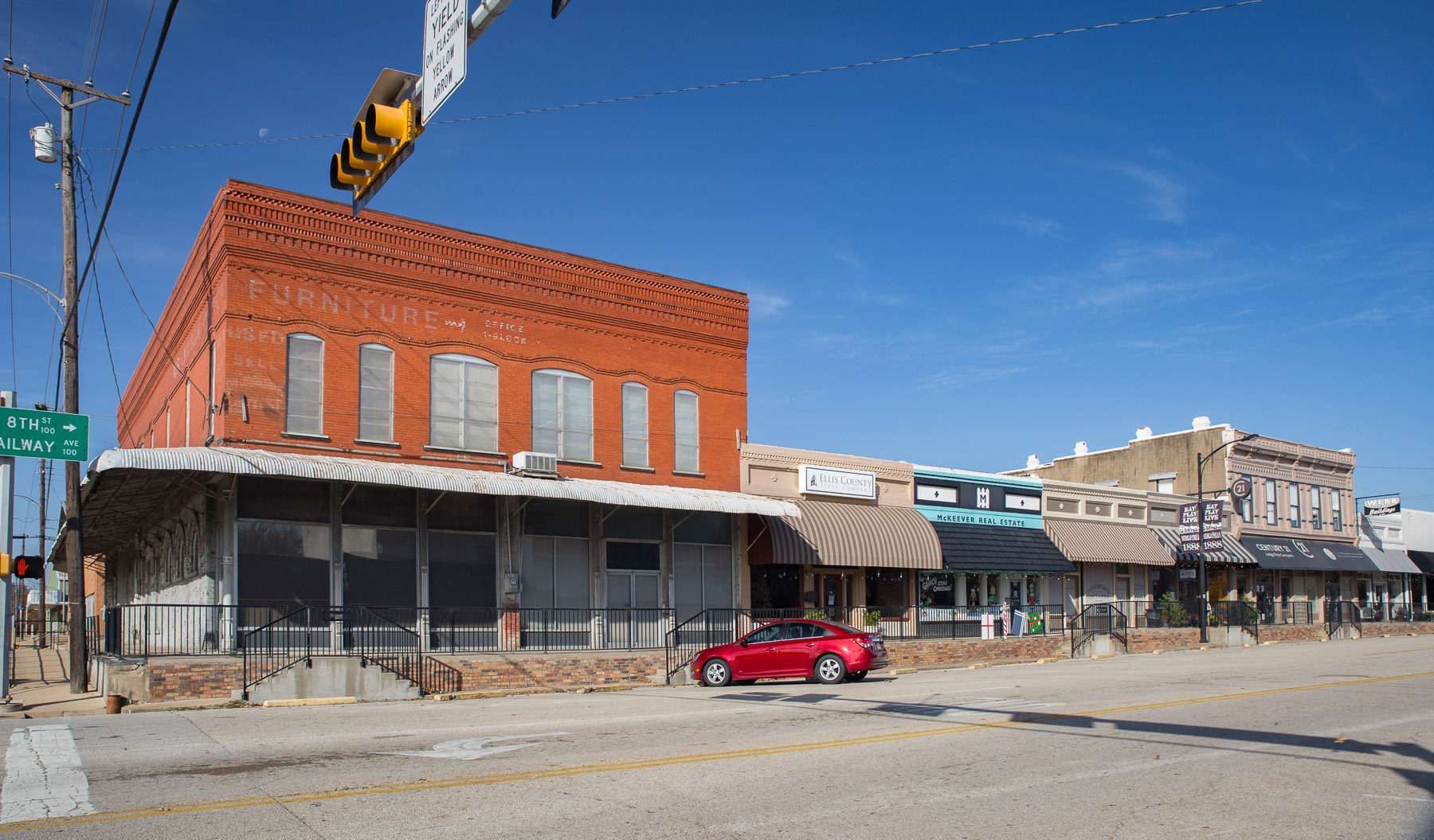

- Flag
- Motto: "DFW's Southern Star"
- Location within Texas
- Coordinates: 32°30′25″N 97°00′25″W
- Country: United States
- State: Texas
- County: Ellis

Government
  - Type: Council-Manager
  - City Council: Mayor

Area
  - Total: 64.22 sq mi (166.34 km^{2})
  - Land: 63.50 sq mi (164.47 km^{2})
  - Water: 0.73 sq mi (1.88 km^{2})
- Elevation: 781 ft (238 m)

Population (2020)
  - Total: 35,125
  - Density: 553.13/sq mi (213.56/km^{2})
- Time zone: UTC−6 (Central (CST))
  - Summer (DST): UTC−5 (CDT)
- ZIP Code: 76065
- Area codes: 214, 469, 945, 972
- FIPS code: 48-48096
- GNIS feature ID: 2411097
- Website: midlothian.tx.us

Midlothian is a city in northwest Ellis County, Texas, United States. The city is 25 miles (40 km) southwest of Dallas. It is the hub for the cement industry in North Texas, as it is the home to three separate cement production facilities, as well as a steel mill. As of the 2020 census, Midlothian had a population of 35,125.

== History ==
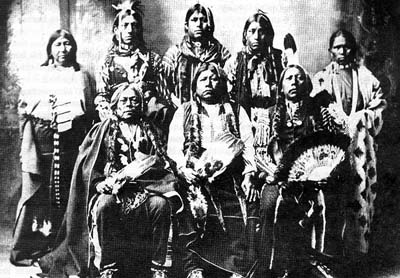
Tonkawa chiefs

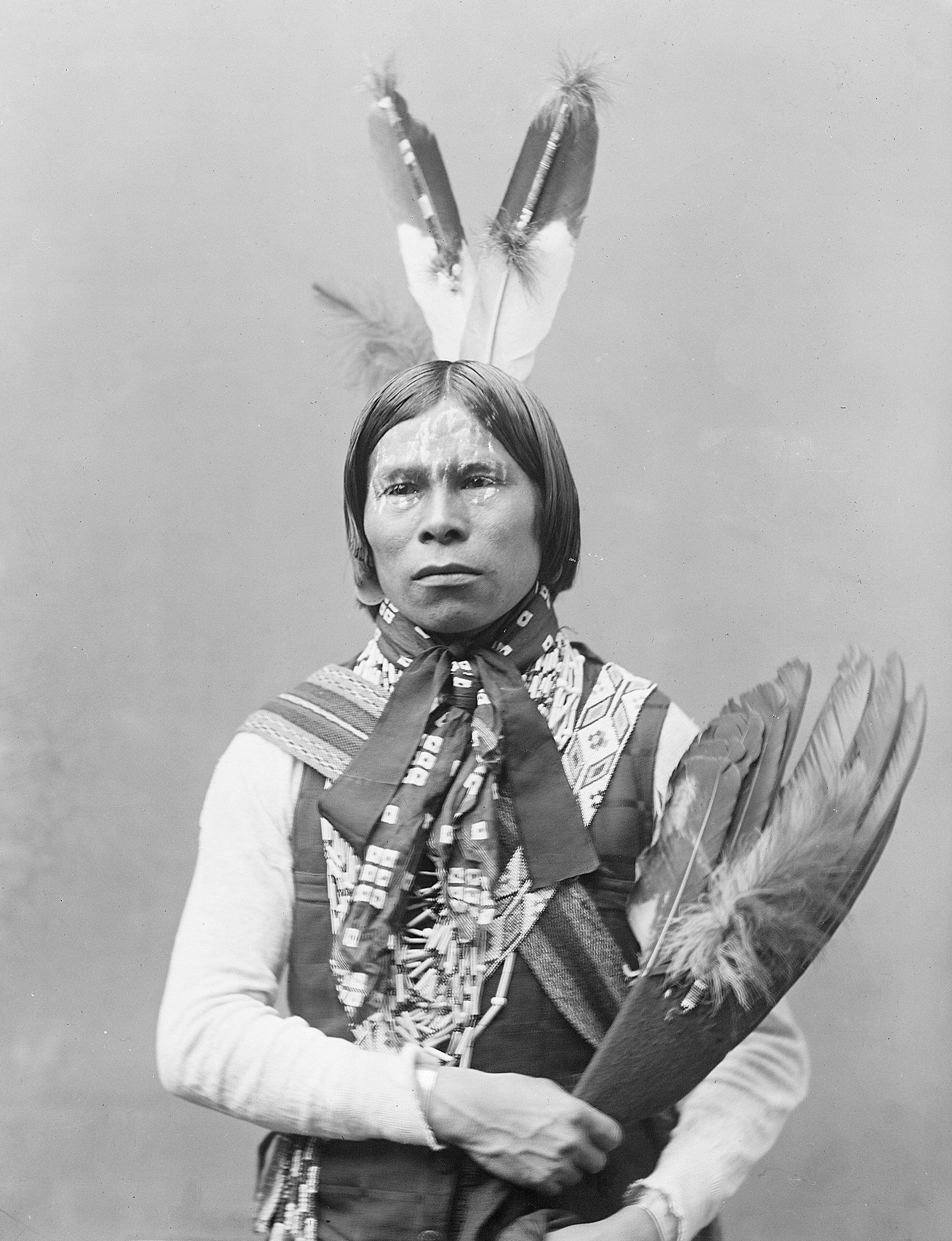
Kickapoo Indian

Midlothian's current motto

Midlothian's old motto

In the early 1800s, settlements began to take place in the area that became Ellis County, but full colonization of this area was slow until 1846, when the US finalized peace treaties initiated by Sam Houston between several of the indigenous inhabitants of the region and the Republic of Texas. The earliest inhabitants of this area were the Tonkawa people, but other tribes also hunted in this area, including the Anadarko, Bidai, Kickapoo, and Waco peoples.

The future Ellis County area of the young Republic of Texas was known as the Peters Colony, named for a Louisville, Kentucky-based land grant company consisting of English and American investors. The Mexican empresario grant program encouraged settlements in the province of Texas. The few settlers who lived in this region trapped animals and sold their pelts, and traded goods with the natives. The majority of Ellis County's original settlers came from the southern half of the United States. They arrived with their cultural and educational traditions, their methods of farming and care for farm animals, and for a few, the people they had enslaved.

Some of the earliest settlers of the area were the families of William Alden Hawkins and Larkin Newton, who moved to the area in 1848. For Hawkins to claim his 640 acres (260 ha) of land from the Peters Colony group, he was required to build a house on the property he chose along the mouth of Waxahachie Creek before July 1, 1848. The structure was built before the required deadline, and the land near the present-day Hawkins Spring went to the Hawkins family. For Larkin Newton, who moved his wife Mary and their eight children from Missouri, the same requirement was given. Larkin met the due date and became owner of his 640-acre claim. In 1903, William Alden Hawkins' grandson William Larkin Hawkins purchased land and built the William L and Emma Hawkins House, now listed as a Recorded Texas Historic Landmark.

Ellis County was officially established by the Texas Legislature on December 20, 1849, in a bill sponsored by General Edward H. Tarrant, a popular Texas Ranger and Indian gunfighter during this period. Organized in February 1850, the county was carved out of Navarro County and likely named for Richard Ellis.

In 1883, the name "Midlothian" was accepted by the local population. According to local legend, the area was named Midlothian when the Chicago, Texas, and Mexican Central railroads, which eventually connected Dallas and Cleburne, arrived in the area and a homesick Scottish train engineer stated that the local countryside reminded him of his homeland in Scotland, and the location served as the midpoint between Dallas and Cleburne, and between Ennis and Fort Worth. With the coming of the railroad, Midlothian grew and was incorporated in April 1888.

One of the oldest churches in the city, the First United Methodist Church, was built in 1902, followed by the First Presbyterian Church, constructed in 1913. The Midlothian Cemetery contains headstones dating back to the 1870s. The St Paul Cemetery also stands outside of the city.

== Geography ==
Midlothian is located in northwestern Ellis County. Adjacent cities are Cedar Hill to the north, Grand Prairie to the northwest, Venus to the southwest, Waxahachie to the southeast, and Ovilla to the northeast.

According to the United States Census Bureau, in 2010 the city had a total area of 50.4 square miles (130.5 km^{2}), of which 49.8 sq mi (128.9 km^{2}) are land and 0.66 sq mi (1.7 km^{2}), or 1.28%, is covered by water. Midlothian's extraterritorial jurisdiction includes another 33 square miles (85 km^{2}).

=== Climate ===
The climate in this area is characterized by hot, humid summers and generally mild to cool winters. According to the Köppen climate classification, Midlothian has a humid subtropical climate, Cfa on climate maps.

== Demographics ==
Historical population
Census	Pop.	Note	%±
1890	297		—
1900	832		180.1%
1910	868		4.3%
1920	1,298		49.5%
1930	1,168		−10.0%
1940	1,027		−12.1%
1950	1,177		14.6%
1960	1,521		29.2%
1970	2,322		52.7%
1980	3,219		38.6%
1990	5,141		59.7%
2000	7,480		45.5%
2010	18,037		141.1%
2020	35,125		94.7%
2023 (est.)	41,352		17.7%
U.S. Decennial Census

=== 2020 census ===
As of the 2020 census, Midlothian had a population of 35,125, 11,576 households, and 8,817 families residing in the city.

The median age was 36.2 years. 28.6% of residents were under the age of 18 and 11.5% of residents were 65 years of age or older. For every 100 females there were 97.3 males, and for every 100 females age 18 and over there were 93.3 males age 18 and over.

90.2% of residents lived in urban areas, while 9.8% lived in rural areas.

There were 11,576 households in Midlothian, of which 45.7% had children under the age of 18 living in them. Of all households, 67.5% were married-couple households, 10.3% were households with a male householder and no spouse or partner present, and 17.9% were households with a female householder and no spouse or partner present. About 14.4% of all households were made up of individuals and 6.2% had someone living alone who was 65 years of age or older.

There were 11,978 housing units, of which 3.4% were vacant. The homeowner vacancy rate was 0.9% and the rental vacancy rate was 6.2%.

Racial composition as of the 2020 census
Race	Number	Percentage
White	25,810	73.5%
Black or African American	3,223	9.2%
American Indian and Alaska Native	253	0.7%
Asian	390	1.1%
Native Hawaiian and Other Pacific Islander	25	0.1%
Some other race	1,846	5.3%
Two or more races	3,578	10.2%
Hispanic or Latino (of any race)	5,644	16.1%

=== 2010 census ===
As of the 2010 census, the population density was 362.5 inhabitants per square mile (140.0/km^{2}), with a total population of 18,037 people. The 6,138 housing units averaged 74.0 per square mile (28.6/km^{2}). The racial makeup of the city was 88.5% White, 3.6% African American, 0.4% Native American, 0.8% Asian, 0.1% Pacific Islander, 4.2% from other races, and 2.4% from two or more races. Hispanics or Latinos of any race were 15.2% of the population.

== Government ==
The city of Midlothian was incorporated in 1888, and on October 1, 1980, the city was granted a home-rule charter. Midlothian uses a council-manager form of government. The city council is composed of a mayor and six at-large council members elected by the citizenry.

== Economy ==
Prior to 1929 and the Great Depression, a number of businesses flourished in the city. The two largest business enterprises centered around cotton and cattle-raising. The region was transformed in later years by the arrival of the cement industry. Midlothian became a prime area for cement quarrying due to the Austin Chalk Escarpment, a unique geological formation that runs north–south through the city. Three of the top-10 largest cement factories in the United States operate in the city: Martin Marrietta Materials (formerly TXI), Holcim, and Ash Grove. Gerdau Ameristeel operates a large steel factory (formerly Chaparral Steel) adjacent to Martin Marrietta's cement plant.

A large industrial park, Railport, is located along U.S. 67 on the southwestern side of the city. Railport is home to several distribution facilities including Target and QuikTrip.

The northern side of the city is host to MidTexas International Center's Auto Park, a large automobile distribution and processing center; and Texas Central Business Lines, a rail transload facility.

=== Top employers ===
According to Midlothian's 2023 Annual Comprehensive Financial Report, the top employers in the city are:

#	Employer	# of Employees
1	Gerdau	1,250
1	Target	1,250
3	Ash Grove Texas Cement	250
3	Lafarge Holcim Texas	250
3	Martin Marietta Materials	250
3	QuikTrip Distribution	250
3	SunOpta Grains and Foods	250
3	Sunrider Manufacturing	250
9	Aurorium	100
9	Google Midlothian	100
9	MidTexas International Center	100
9	Vistra Energy	100
10	Big Hodge	14
11	LW Landscaping	11

== Education ==
=== Primary and secondary education ===
Primary and secondary education in the majority of the municipality is provided by the Midlothian Independent School District (MISD), which encompasses an area around 112 square miles (290 km^{2}). MISD conducts programs for kindergarten through grade 12 and employs roughly 850 employees. MISD has nine school campuses (six are elementary schools with grades K–5) with 461 teachers and an enrollment of 7,564 for the 2012–2013 school year. The student-to-teacher ratio is 16 to 1.

MISD students have historically excelled in a number of extracurricular activities. At Midlothian High School, called the "Panthers", students have been awarded numerous times in agricultural problem-solvers competitions, and high-quality music organizations. The Midlothian High School baseball, soccer, and softball teams are often seen in the 5A playoff bracket. A $14,000,000 multipurpose athletic stadium was constructed in 2006. The second high school, opened in 2014, is Midlothian Heritage High School, and the "Jaguars" compete in 5A sports and extracurricular activities as of the 2022-2023 school year.

Some parts of the city extend into the Waxahachie Independent School District, which operates Waxahachie High School.

=== Higher education ===
Higher education opportunities are also readily available in Midlothian. On April 25, 2012, the Texas Higher Education Coordinating Board approved the establishment of a multi-institutional teaching center (MITC) in Midlothian known as the Midlothian Higher Education Center (MHEC). As one of only nine MITCs in Texas, the MHEC is a partnership consisting of Navarro College-Midlothian, Tarleton State University, Texas A&M University-Commerce, and University of North Texas-Dallas. The collaboration between the four institutions provides area students the ability to complete baccalaureate and graduate degree programs at Navarro College's Midlothian campus.

== Transportation ==
Midlothian is located at the junction of U.S. Highway 67 and U.S. Highway 287. The city's location provides easy access to an important ground transportation network consisting of interstate highways, U.S. highways, and state highways that connects Dallas, Fort Worth, the rest of the Metroplex, and the state.

In May 2015, Padera Lake, located three miles northwest of Midlothian, was full from torrential rains. Water overflowing and cracks in an earthen dam gave rise to concerns that failure was imminent. If the dam failed, U.S. Route 287 could have been flooded with up to 15 ft of water, and some severe flooding in the northward-flowing direction towards Joe Pool Lake. Relief efforts included pumping water from behind the dam, and disaster was averted.

=== MidWay Regional Airport ===
Located 3 miles (5 km) east of Midlothian is MidWay Regional Airport (JWY). Jointly operated by the cities of Midlothian and Waxahachie, MidWay Regional Airport is a 320-acre (130 ha) corporate and general-aviation airport. It is a full-service fixed-base operator offering maintenance, repair, rental, sales, servicing, flight planning, computerized weather, UNICOM, RCO, and AWOS. The airport opened in October 1992 to serve a rapidly growing area. An expansion project completed in January 2012 included a major terminal renovation.

=== Eagles Nest Estates Airport ===
Located four miles northeast of Midlothian is Eagles Nest Estates Airport (T56). The airport is in the Eagles Nest Estates Airport Community neighborhood; while it is privately owned by the Eagles Nest Property Association, it is still open to the public. It has no ATC and it relies on pilot-to-pilot communication. The airport opened up in February 1985.

== Notable people ==
- Jake Ellzey, U.S. representative
- Yusuf Estes, American Islamic preacher and chaplain
- Chris Kyle, Navy SEAL sniper with the most confirmed kills of any American serviceman
- Bryce Petty, former NFL quarterback for the New York Jets
- Don Floyd, further AFL defensive end for the Houston Oilers
