= Pamela (name) =

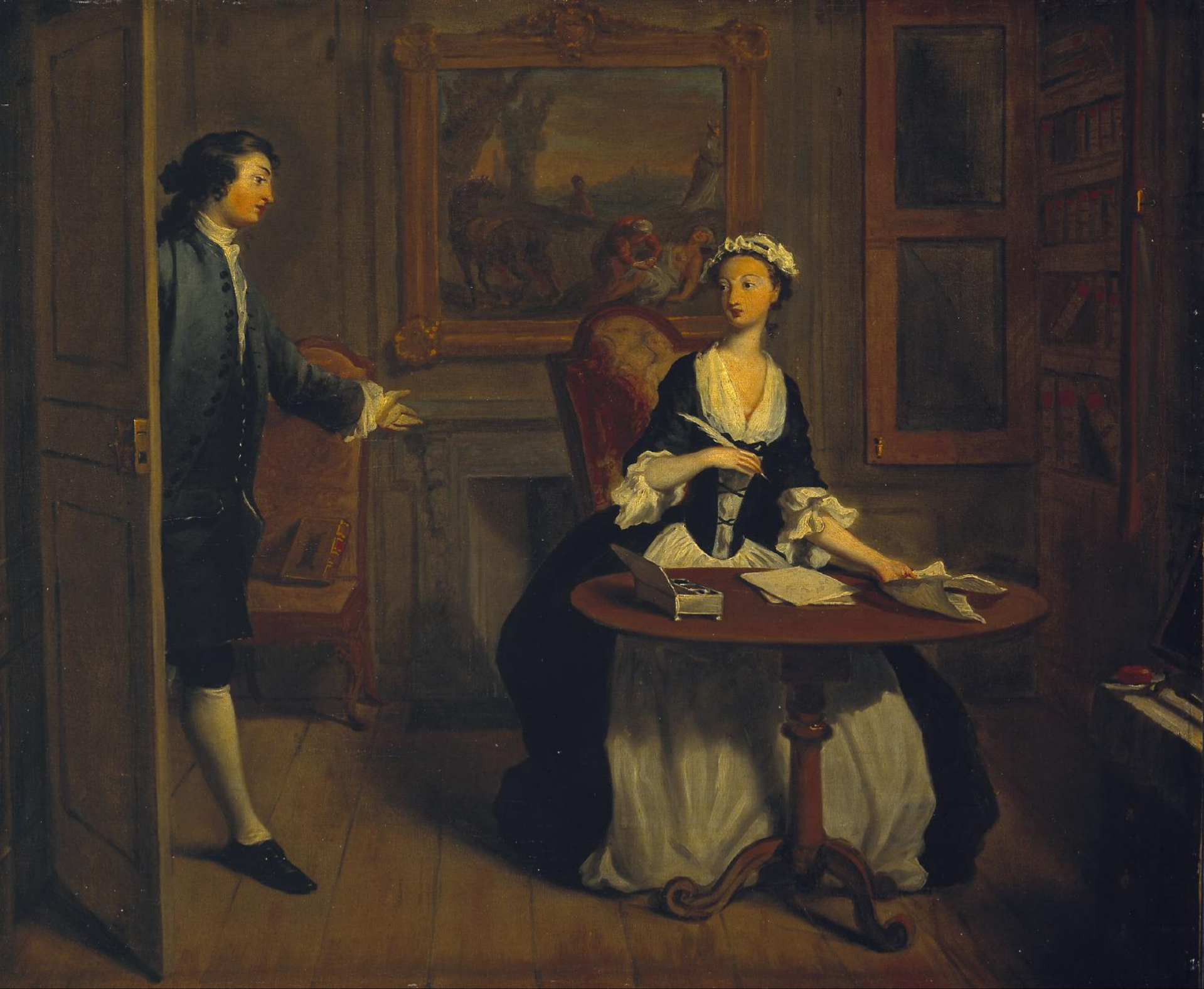
- Mr. B. Finds Pamela Writing, by Joseph Highmore.
- Pronunciation: /ˈpæmələ/ PAM-ə-lə
- Gender: Female

Origin
- Origin: unknown
- Region of origin: England, 16th century

Other names
- Related names: Pam

Pamela is a feminine given name, often abbreviated to Pam. Pamela is also infrequently used as a surname.

== History ==
Sir Philip Sidney invented the name Pamela for a pivotal character in his epic prose work, The Countess of Pembroke's Arcadia, written in the late 16th century and published posthumously. The name is widely taken to mean "all sweetness", formed on the Greek words πᾶν pan ("all") and μέλι meli ("honey"), but there is no evidence regarding what meaning, if any, Sidney intended for it.

The Samuel Richardson novel Pamela in 1740 or 1741 inaugurated the use of Pamela as a given name, though it remained a rare name. The name's popularity may have been hindered by the tendency to pronounce it /pəˈmiːlə/ pə-MEE-lə which was not fully superseded by the now-standard /ˈpæmələ/ PAM-ə-lə until the start of the 20th century when the name finally entered general usage. Pamelia was a commonly used version of the name in use in the Southern United States. This evolved into Permelia, a variant of the name in use since the 1700s. Other derivations and spelling variants in use in the 18th and 19th centuries included Palmelia, Pamala, Pamelea, Pamella, Pamelie, Pamena, Pamida, Pamina, Pamla, Pammala, Parmela, Parmelia, Parmilla, and Permilia.

Pamela was very popular in Great Britain from the 1930s through the 1950s with the tallies of the most popular names for British newborn girls for the respective years 1934, 1944 and 1954 ranking Pamela at respectively No. 20, No. 17 and No. 24. Evidently less popular from the 1960s—being ranked on the respective 1964 tally at No. 67—the name Pamela has grown increasingly unfashionable in recent years. The name was similarly most used throughout the Anglosphere from the 1940s through the mid-1970s. For instance, it was among the one hundred most used names for girls in the United States between 1943 and 1976 and remained among the one thousand most used names for American girls until 2011. It has since declined in use.

== Given name ==
People with the name or its variants include:

- Pamela Adlon (née Segall), American actress, writer and director
- Pamela Anderson, Canadian-American actress, model and media personality
- Pamela Bach (1963–2025), American actress
- Pamela Barnes (1937–1975), New Zealand artist
- Pamela Begič (born 1994), Slovenian footballer
- Pamela Bellwood, American actress
- Pamela J. Bjorkman, American biochemist and molecular biologist
- Pamela Bondi (born 1965), Attorney General of the United States
- Pamella Bordes, Indian choreographer and model
- Pamela Indah Bowie, Indonesian actress
- Pamela Branch, British crime novelist
- Pamela Britton, American actress and singer
- Pamela Brown, multiple people
- Pamela Brooks, British writer
- Pamela Bustin, American field hockey player-coach
- Pamela Butchart, Scottish children's author
- Pamela Carruthers, British showjumper, and showjumping course designer
- Pamela Brewington Cashwell, American politician
- Pamela Chopra, Indian playback singer and film producer
- Pamela Clabburn, British museum curator and writer
- Pamela Copus, American musical artist
- Pamela Courson, long-term companion of Jim Morrison
- Pamela Kyle Crossley, historian
- Pamela Crowe, Manx politician
- Pamela Cundell, British actress
- Pamela Dean, American fantasy author
- Pamela Des Barres (born Pamela Ann Miller), American rock and roll groupie, writer, musician, and actress
- Pamela Duncan (novelist), American novelist
- Pamela Duncan (actress), American actress
- Pamelyn Ferdin (or "Pamela Lynn"), child actress, animal rights activist
- Pamela Fitzgerald (disambiguation), multiple people
- Pamela Frank, American musician
- Pamela Frankau, English novelist
- Pamela Franklin, British actress
- Pamela Gay, American astronomer
- Pamela Geller, American anti-Muslim, far-right political activist, blogger and commentator
- Pamela Gemin, American writer and academic
- Pamela Gidley, American actress and model
- Pamela Gorkin, American mathematician
- Pamela Green, English model and actress
- Pamela Green (DJ), American hip hop girl group formed in 1985
- Pamela Gordon (actress), American actress
- Pamela Gordon (Bermudian politician), Bermudian politician
- Pamela Anne Gordon, Canadian model
- Pamela Harmsworth, Viscountess Rothermere, British viscountess
- Pamela Harriman, American diplomat
- Pamela Hayden, American actress
- Pamela Healy, American sailor
- Pamela Hensley, American actress and author
- Lady Pamela Hicks, British aristocrat and relative of the British royal family
- Pamela Isaacs, American singer and actress
- Pamela Jelimo, Kenyan middle distance runner
- Pamela Hansford Johnson, English writer and critic
- Pamela Jones, computer law scholar
- Pamela Joyner (born 1957/58), American art collector
- Pamela S. Karlan, American legal scholar
- Pamela Katz, American screenwriter and novelist
- Pamela M. Kilmartin, New Zealand astronomer
- Pamela Kirkham, 16th Baroness Berners, British parliamentarian
- Pamela Klassen, scholar of religion
- Pamela Knaack, German actress
- Pamela Kunz, American oncologist
- Pamela Kurrell, American discus thrower
- Pamela Levy, Israeli artist
- Pamela Liddell (born 1986), Scottish footballer
- Pamela London, Guyanese boxer
- Pamela Martin (disambiguation), multiple people
- Pamela Sue Martin, American actress
- Pamela Melroy, American astronaut
- Pamela Merritt, American writer and reproductive justice activist
- Pamela Milam, American murder victim
- Pamela Morris, English publisher and teacher
- Pamela Munro, American linguist
- Pamela O'Malley, Irish-Spanish bohemian, educationalist and radical
- Pamela Pasinetti (born 1993), Thai-Italian model and beauty pageant titleholder
- Pamela Payton-Wright, American actress
- Pamela Rabe, Canadian actress
- Pamela Rai (born 1966), Canadian swimmer
- Pamela Rambo, colorist
- Pamela Ramljak, Hungarian musical artist
- Pamela C. Rasmussen, American ornithologist
- Pamela Reed, American actress
- Pamela Ribon, American screenwriter, author, blogger and actress
- Pamela Rooks, Indian film director and screenwriter
- Pamela Salem, British actress
- Pamela Samuelson, American lawyer and professor
- Pamela Sargent, American feminist, science fiction author, and editor
- Pamela Noutcho Sawa, Cameroonian-Italian boxer
- Pamela Sharples, British politician
- Pamela Susan Shoop, American actress and writer
- Pamela Silver, American biologist
- Pamela Smart, American criminal
- Pamela A. Smith (born 1968), U.S. police chief
- Pamela Colman Smith, British artist, illustrator, writer, publisher, and occultist
- Pamela Safitri, Indonesian actress
- Pamela Jayne Soles (born 1950), American actress, commonly known as P. J. Soles
- Pamela Spence, Turkish actress and singer
- Pamela Spitzmueller (1950–2025), American conservator and book artist
- Pamela Springsteen, American actress and photographer
- Pamela Stein, American model
- Pamela Stephenson, New Zealand-born psychologist, writer, actress and comedian
- Pamela Veuleman Trammell, American historian and clubwoman
- Pamela Tiffin, American actress and model
- Pamela Lyndon "P. L." Travers, Australian-British writer
- Pamela Tucker (born 1963), American politician
- Pamela Rogers Turner (born 1977), teacher and child rapist
- Pamela Vitale, American murderer
- Pamela Wallin, Canadian politician
- Pamela Warhurst (born 1950), British Incredible Edible cofounder
- Pamela Willeford, American Ambassador
- Pamela Williams, American musician
- Pamela Robertson Wojcik, American film scholar and academic
- Pamela Rouse Wright, American philanthropist, clubwoman, businesswoman, and jewelry designer
- Pamela Wynne, British writer
- Pamela Ayo Yetunde, American Buddhist, educator and writer
- Pamela Zoline, American writer and painter

== Surname ==
- Lucia Pamela, American musician

== Fictional characters ==
- Pamela, one of the Thea Sisters in Thea Stilton
- Ursula Pamela Buffay, Phoebe Buffay's twin sister in NBC sitcom Friends
- Pamela Andrews, heroine of Samuel Richardson's novel Pamela, or Virtue Rewarded (1740–1741)
- Dr. Pamela Lillian Isley or Poison Ivy, character in DC Comics and enemy of Batman
- Pamela Voorhees, in the Friday the 13th films
- Pamela Barnes Ewing, in TV series Dallas
- Pamela, one of the main characters of the 1987 Mexican sitcom television series ¡Ah qué Kiko!
- Pamela Abbott, one of the Abbott sisters in the movie, Inventing the Abbotts
- Pamela Douglas, from soap opera The Bold and the Beautiful
- Pamela Ibis, a recurring character from the Atelier series of video games.
- Pamela Moran, a main character in Army Wives
- Pamela Byrnes (later Focker), a main character in the Meet the Parents film trilogy
- Pamela Beesly, from the sitcom The Office
- Pamela Swynford De Beaufort, from the HBO TV series, True Blood.

== See also ==
- Pam (disambiguation)
- List of Wikipedia articles starting with Pamela
- List of Wikipedia articles starting with Pam
