= PAM =

Pam or PAM may refer to:

== Geography ==
- Pam, Iran, a village in Markazi Province
- Piedmont Atlantic Megaregion (PAM), United States
- Pam Islands, Papua New Guinea

== People and fictional characters ==
- Pam (given name), a list of people and fictional characters
- Pam (surname), a list of people
- Henry John Temple, 3rd Viscount Palmerston (1784–1865), nicknamed Pam

== Arts and entertainment ==
- "Pam" (song), by Justin Quiles, Daddy Yankee and El Alfa
- Progressive Art Movement, a 1970s art movement in Adelaide, South Australia
- Portland Art Museum, Portland, Oregon, United States
- Pam the Bird, a common graffiti tag in Melbourne, Victoria
- Performing Arts Museum, former name of the Australian Performing Arts Collection, Melbourne, Australia
- Pam, a name for the jack of clubs in the card game Lanterloo or Loo

== Military ==
- P.A.M. 1 & P.A.M. 2 (Pistola Ametrelladora Modelo), an Argentine submachine gun based on the US M3 "Grease Gun"
- Permanent Active Militia, predecessor of the Canadian Army
- Policy Analysis Market, an abandoned DARPA program
- Precision Attack Munition, an abandoned artillery missile project
- M150 Penetration Augmented Munition, an explosive device developed for the US Air Force
- Tyndall Air Force Base, Panama City, Florida, US (IATA code PAM)

== Organizations ==
=== Political parties ===
- Agrarian Party of Moldova, or Partidul Agrar din Moldova
- Authenticity and Modernity Party, or Parti Authenticité et Modernité, a political party in Morocco
- Party of the Vlachs of Macedonia, known in Aromanian as Partia Armãnjilor ditu Machidunie
- People's Action Movement, a political party in Saint Kitts and Nevis

=== Other organizations ===
- PAM Health, formerly Post Acute Medical
- Pont-à-Mousson Company, French iron pipe manufacturer (established 1856)
- Service Union United (Finnish: Palvelualojen ammattiliitto), a trade union in Finland
- World Food Programme, also known as Programme alimentaire mondial, a United Nations organization

== Science and technology ==
=== Biology and healthcare ===
- PAM (gene), human gene that encodes peptidylglycine alpha-amidating monooxygenase
- Pancreatic acinar metaplasia, in gastroenterology
- Photoacoustic microscopy, a type of photoacoustic imaging in biomedicine
- Pneumatic artificial muscles, used in artificial limbs
- Point accepted mutation, a type of similarity matrix in computational biology
- Positive allosteric modulator, in pharmacology
- Pralidoxime, 2-PAM, or pyridine aldoximine methiodide; an acetylcholinesterase inhibitor
- Pregnancy-associated malaria
- Primary amoebic meningoencephalitis
- Protospacer adjacent motif, a genetic DNA recognition sequence

=== Computing ===
- PAM graphics format, used by Netpbm
- PAM library, Parallel Augmented Map, a parallel library for ordered sets and maps using balanced binary trees
- Pluggable authentication modules (also known as X/Open Single Sign-on), a Unix authentication framework
  - OpenPAM
  - Linux PAM
- Privileged access management, a type of cybersecurity tool

=== Other uses in science and technology ===
- Partitioning Around Medoids, in statistics, a data clustering algorithm
- Payload Assist Module, a small rocket engine, also referred to as a PAM-D
- Phone-as-Modem, sharing a phone's internet connection with other devices
- Polyacrylamide, a polymer
- Positive electrode Active Material, the surface layer of the positive electrode of a rechargeable battery
- Pulse-amplitude modulation, a technique for encoding information onto a series of signal pulses

== Storms ==
- Cyclone Pam (1974)
- Cyclone Pam (1997)
- Cyclone Pam, a tropical cyclone from the 2014–15 South Pacific cyclone season

== Other uses ==
- PAM (cooking oil), a brand of cooking spray, acronym of "Product of Arthur Meyerhoff"
- Pittsburgh, Allegheny and McKees Rocks Railroad, reporting mark PAM
- Kapampangan language (ISO 639-2 and ISO 639-3 code pam), in the Philippines
- Pam language, a nearly extinct language of northern Cameroon

== See also ==
- PAMS (disambiguation)
