= Steve Collins (American football) =

American football player (born 1970)

Profile
- Position: Quarterback

Personal information
- Born: August 2, 1970 (age 56); Ennis, Texas, U.S.

Career information
- College: Oklahoma (1988–1992)

Steve Collins (born August 2, 1970) is an American former football quarterback who played for the Oklahoma Sooners from 1988 to 1992.

Collins attended Ennis High School and was the quarterback of the school's football team. He was recruited by various colleges, and decided to attend Oklahoma; during collegiate recruiting, scouts considered him one of the best option quarterbacks in the state.

Collins redshirted his freshman year at Oklahoma in 1988. After starting quarterback Charles Thompson's arrest, the starting job was said to be between Collins, unrelated fellow freshman Tink Collins, and sophomore Chris Melson, none of whom had played a college football game yet. After summer drills were completed, Collins was granted the starting job for the Sooners, becoming the first freshman in school history to start the season opener at quarterback. Collins began the season as starting quarterback in 1989, but he broke the pinky on his right hand on the first play of the Sooners' 33-7 victory over Baylor on September 9, 1989. In early November, he returned to the lineup and ran for 147 yards and two touchdowns, and passed for 119 yards and a touchdown in a 52-14 win over Missouri.

As a redshirt sophomore in 1990, Collins was Oklahoma's starting quarterback for the first six games of the season. He lost the starting job for the last half of the 1990 season to Cale Gundy. He remained Gundy's backup for most of the 1991 season. As a senior in 1992, Collins began the year as the Sooners' backup quarterback, but Collins became the team's starting quarterback after Gundy suffered a concussion in the seventh game of the season. During the 1992 season, there was dissension among the players over the decision of Coach Gary Gibbs to name Gundy as the starting quarterback over Collins.

== Notes and references ==
- Dozier, Ray (2005). The Oklahoma Football Encyclopedia. Sports Publishing LLC. p. 329. ISBN 978-1-58261-699-5.
