= St. John High School (Ennis, Texas) =

Coordinates: 32.325275°N 96.619431°W

Location
- 701 S Paris Street; Ennis, Texas 75119

Information
- Type: Private, Coeducational
- Religious affiliation: Roman Catholic
- Established: 1912
- Closed: 2008
- Grades: 9-12
- Colors: Blue and Gold
- Mascot: Crusader
- Rival: T.K. Gorman High School, Notre Dame High School
- Website: http://www.stjohncs.org

St. John High School was a private, Roman Catholic high school associated with St. John Nepomucene Catholic Church in Ennis, Texas. It was located in the Roman Catholic Diocese of Dallas.

== Background ==
St. John Catholic School was established in 1912. A high school was added in 1939. At the recommendation of Reverend Edison Vela, the current pastor for St. John Catholic at that time, Bishop Kevin Farrell accepted the recommendation that the school be closed in July 2008. The reasons for closure were cited as declining enrollment (138 students registered for K-12) and financial shortfalls ($250K).

The last principal at St. John high school was Chris Rebuck. Mr. Rebuck subsequently moved to Bishop Lynch High School in Dallas, TX where he initially served as Dean of Students and later became President beginning with the 2016-2017 school year.

St. John was a member of the Texas Christian Interscholastic League (TCIL) until 2000 when the league ceased to exist. Subsequently, St. John joined the Texas Association of Private and Parochial Schools (TAPPS) until the school closed.
