= Pam (surname) =

Pam is a surname. Notable people by that name include:

- Alvin Pam, American psychologist and author
- Avraham Yaakov Pam (1913–2001), rosh yeshiva in New York
- David Pam (1920–2014), British historian
- Eleanor Pam (born 1936), President of the Veteran Feminists of America
- James Pam (1933–1966), Nigerian military officer
- John Wash Pam (1940–2014), Nigerian politician
- Max Pam (born 1949), Australian photographer
- Sam Pam (born 1968), Nigerian former footballer
- Simi Pam (born 1995), English rugby union player
- Victor Pam (1936–2009), Nigerian police officer and traditional ruler

== See also ==
- Pamela (name), a feminine given name
