= Pam (given name) =

Pam is a feminine given name, often a diminutive form (hypocorism) of Pamela.

== People ==
- Pam Arciero (born 1954), American puppeteer
- Pam Ayres (born 1947), British poet, comedian, songwriter and presenter
- Pam Barnes (television producer), Australian television producer
- Pamela "Pam" Bondi (born 1965), American attorney and politician, Attorney General of Florida
- Pamela "Pam" Bowers (born 1949), American college basketball head coach
- Pam Brady (born 1969), American writer and television producer
- Pam Buckway (born 1949), Canadian politician
- Pam Burridge (born 1965), Australian surfer
- Pamela "Pam" Cameron (born 1971), politician in Northern Ireland
- Pamela "Pam" Casale (born 1963), American tennis player
- Pamela "Pam" Dawber (born 1951), American actress
- Pamela "Pam" Dreyer (born 1981), American ice hockey player
- Pamela "Pam" Ferris (born 1948), British actress
- Pam Flowers (born 1946), American adventurer, speaker and author who has led sled-dog expeditions to the Arctic.
- Pamela "Pam" Grier (born 1949), American actress
- Pam Hallandal (1929–2018), Australian artist
- Pam Kehaly, American health insurance executive
- Pam Lins, American artist
- Pam Long, American writer and executive producer
- Pam Marshall (born 1960), American sprinter
- Pamela "Pam" Peters (born 1942), Emeritus Professor of Linguistics at Macquarie University, Sydney, Australia
- Pam Muñoz Ryan (born 1951), American writer for children and young adults
- Pamela "Pam" Oliver (born 1962), American sportscaster
- Pamela "Pam" Patenaude (born 1961), American government official
- Pam Reynolds (1956–2010), American singer-songwriter who claimed to have had a near-death experience during surgery
- Pamela "Pam" Shriver (born 1961), American tennis player
- Pam Taylor (1929–2014), British sculptor
- Pam Tillis (born 1957), American country music singer-songwriter and actress
- Pam Tshwete (born 1951), South African politician
- Pam Warren (speaker) (born 1967), British author, activist and founder of the Paddington Survivor's Group
- Pamela "Pam" Warren (civil servant), American civil servant and former Oklahoma Secretary of Administration
- Pam the Funkstress (1966–2017), American DJ

== Fictional characters ==
- Pam, a vampire from The Southern Vampire Mysteries/Sookie Stackhouse Series by Charlaine Harris, and the American television drama series True Blood
- Pamela Pam Beesly, on the American TV series The Office
- Pam Coker, on the British soap opera EastEnders
- Pamela Pam Ewing, on the American soap opera Dallas
- Pam, a character in the mobile video game, Brawl Stars and Squad Busters
- Pam, a younger brother of Tuxedosam whom appears in Hello Kitty Island Adventure where he is pink as an island visitor despite his feminine name and is often depicted with a hat with blue trim, and a blue bow-tie, complementing his (and Tuxedosam's other) brother Tam.
