= Parmelia =

Parmelia may refer to:

- Parmelia (barque), the vessel that in 1829 transported the first settlers of the British colony of Western Australia
- Parmelia (fungus), a genus of lichens with global distribution
- Parmelia, Western Australia, a suburb of Kwinana, Western Australia

== See also ==
- Pamela (name)
