= Hix McCanless =

American architect, surveyor, and civil engineer

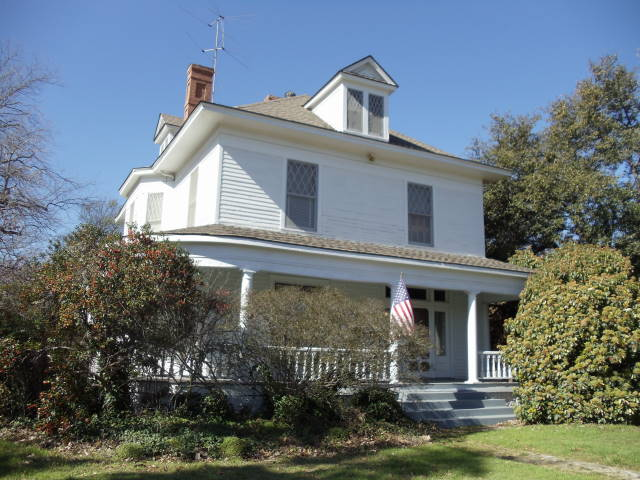
Telfair House, Ennis, Texas

Hix McCanless (born 1868 in Tennessee) was an architect, surveyor, and civil engineer of Ennis, Texas.

== Early life ==
After the establishment of railroad service, McCanless's family moved from Tennessee to Ennis when he was a small boy. He attested Texas A&M College, and returned to Ennis in the 1890s

== Career ==
In Ennis, he rapidly became established as one of the best-respected architects in town by 1902, and was actively working as an architect, and sometimes surveyor and platter, until at least 1924.

He designed many of the city's most prominent institutional, commercial, and domestic structures, and was noted as "something of an artist", combining architectural elements of different styles including Georgian Revival, American Bungalow, late Victorian, Neoclassical, and even fanciful Medieval elements.

He became the Ennis city engineer by the early 1920s (to at least 1925), and was responsible for the brick paving of the downtown thoroughfares, as well as platting multiple municipal expansions.

A number of his works in Ennis (including his own home) are listed in the National Register of Historic Places.

=== Extant works ===
- Alexander Building, 200 West Ennis Ave.; NRHP-listed
- Allen Building, 204–206 West Ennis Ave.; NRHP-listed
- Clark House, 510 North Preston St.
- Ennis City Hall; NRHP-listed
- Ennis National Bank, West Ennis Ave. and N. Dallas St.; NRHP-listed
- John Rowe Building, 101–105 South Dallas St.; built 1904; NRHP-listed
- Knights of Pythias Building (second), 215 North Dallas St.; built 1910; NRHP-listed
- Masonic Lodge (20th century); NRHP-listed, but described as having been subsequently "severely altered" from McCanless's original
- Matthews–Atwood House, 307 North Sherman St.; NRHP-listed
- Matthews–Templeton House, 606 West Denton St.; NRHP-listed; Bungalow style
- McCanless–Williams House, which McCanless built for himself, 402 West Tyler St.; NRHP-listed
- Meredith–McDowal House, 701 North Gaines St.; NRHP-listed
- Moore Building, 101 Northwest Main St.; NRHP-listed
- Telfair House, 209 North Preston St.; NRHP-listed
- Thomas House, 506 West Denton St.
- 501 South Dallas St.; NRHP-listed; "an especially interesting synthesis of Bungalow form and Neoclassical detail"

=== Works that are no longer standing ===
- Alamo Elementary School; replaced in the 1960s by San Jacinto (KJT) Auditorium, South Paris St. (and not to be confused with the modern Alamo Middle School, West Knox St.)
- Ennis Municipal Hospital (second), Lampasas and Chatfield; built 1924
- Knights of Pythias Building (original); described as an "imposing, crenelated" structure
- Rectory of the old St. John's Catholic Church, Preston St.
