= Tanya Godsey =

- Born: Tanya Gail Godsey; Plainview, Texas, U.S.
- Origin: Nashville, Tennessee, U.S.
- Genre: Worship
- Occupations: Singer, songwriter
- Instruments: vocals, piano, guitar
- Years active: 2005–present
- Label: Mining Mystery
- Website: tanyagodsey.com

Tanya Gail Gilmore (née, Godsey is an American Christian musician and published author. She has released four musical works, and one non-fiction book — Befriending God.

== Early life ==
Godsey was born, Tanya Gail Godsey in Plainview, Texas, born August 29, the daughter of a pastor father, Lynn Gale Godsey, and mother, Maria Atanacia Luna, where she was raised with an older brother in Ennis, Texas and Dallas, Texas. While she became a Christian at the age of six, eventually learning the piano at eleven. After high school, she graduated from Dallas Baptist University, before relocating to Nashville, Tennessee to pursue her music endeavors.

== Music career ==
Her music recording career started in 2005, with the studio album, Nothing Less Than Everything, released in 2005, and re-released on April 23, 2009. While her second studio album, Telling Time, was released on September 12, 2011. The Christmas single, "In One", was released in 2014. She released, Love Lines the Last Horizon, on September 30, 2016, with Mining Ministry Music.

== Personal life ==
She married, Jacob "Jake" Gilmore, in 2005. They reside in Murfreesboro, Tennessee, where the couple are raising their two children together.

== Discography ==
- Nothing Less Than Everything (2005 or April 23, 2009)
- Telling Time (September 12, 2011)
- Love Lines the Last Horizon (September 30, 2016, Mining Mystery)
- The End is The Beginning (July 30, 2021 Mining Mystery Music)
