= Ennis Independent School District =

School district in Texas

Location
- Ellis County, Texas United States of America

District information
- Type: Public
- Established: 1881
- Superintendent: Dr. Greg Bradley
- Governing agency: Texas Education Agency

Students and staff
- Students: 6,466
- Teachers: 380.5
- Staff: 717.2

Other information
- Website: www.ennis.k12.tx.us

Ennis Independent School District is a public school district based in Ennis, Texas, United States with 11 education facilities.

In addition to the majority of Ennis, the district serves the towns of Alma, Bardwell, and Garrett, as well as a section of the Bristol census-designated place, in southeastern Ellis County. A portion of the district extends into northern Navarro County.

They were Texas football state champions in 1975, 2000, 2001, 2004 and 2014.

The Ennis High School Marching Band has earned Superior ratings at their annual marching competition 66 times since the 1950s.

In 2009, the school district was rated "academically acceptable" by the Texas Education Agency.

== Schools ==
- Ennis High School (grades 9–12)
- Ennis Junior High School (grades 7–8)
- Sam Houston Elementary (grades 1–3)
- Stephen F. Austin Elementary (grades 1–3)
- James Bowie Elementary (grades 1–3)
- William B. Travis Elementary (grades 1–3)
- David Crockett Early Childhood Center (grades PK–K)
- George W. Carver Early Childhood Center (grades PK–K)
- Jack Lummus Intermediate School (grades 4–6)
- Dorie Miller Intermediate School (grades 4–6) - [Former Sixth Grade Center grade 6]
- Alamo Education Center (alternative learning programs) - [Former High School]

The district also owns Lion Memorial Stadium, which is to the east of Ennis High School. It is a 10,000-capacity stadium which was completed in 2001, and is the home of the Ennis Lions.
