= Mark Busby =

American academic, novelist and writer (1945–2025)

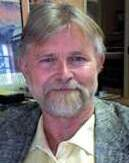
- Busby in 2022
- Born: Mark Bayless Busby; November 30, 1945; Ennis, Texas, U.S.
- Died: August 9, 2025 (aged 79)
- Education: East Texas A&M University; University of Colorado Boulder
- Occupations: Academic, novelist, writer
- Spouse: Linda Whitehouse

Mark Bayless Busby (November 30, 1945 – August 9, 2025) was an American academic, novelist and writer.

== Early life and career ==
Busby was born in Ennis, Texas, on November 30, 1945, the son of James Henry Busby and Monte Allene Scott. He attended East Texas A&M University, earning his BA degree in 1967 and his MA degree in 1969. He also attended the University of Colorado Boulder, earning his PhD degree in English in 1977.

Busby served as a professor in the department of English at Texas State University from 1991 to 2020. During his years as a professor, in 2018, he was named a distinguished professor.

== Personal life and death ==
Busby was married to Linda Whitehouse. Their marriage lasted until Busby's death in 2025.

Busby died on August 9, 2025, at the age of 79.
