= Ennis, Texas =

- City
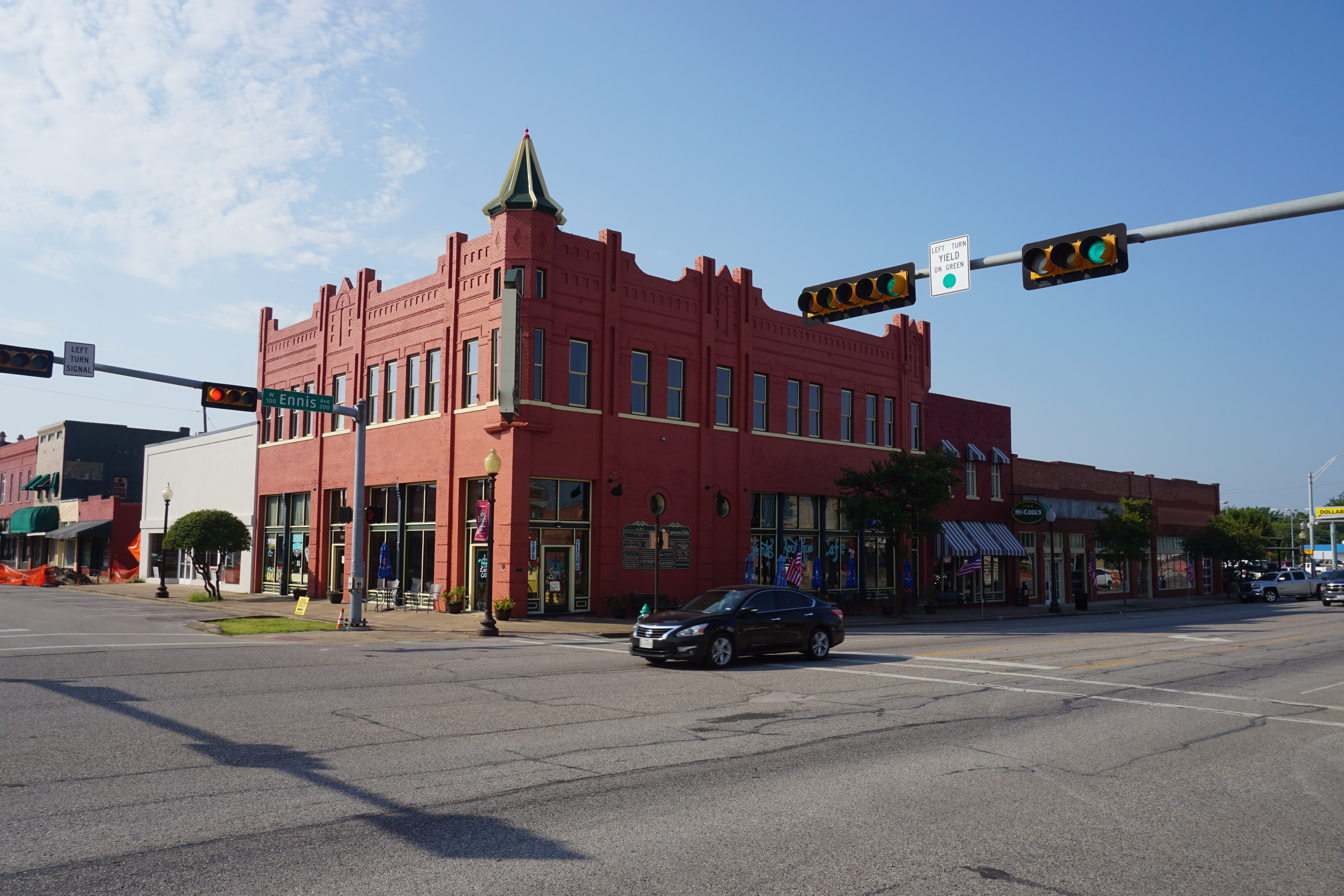

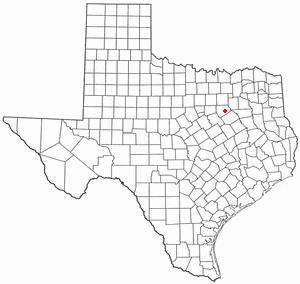
- Location of Ennis, Texas

- Coordinates: 32°19′46″N 96°37′31″W
- Country: United States
- State: Texas
- County: Ellis
- Founded: 1871

Government
  - Type: Council-Manager

Area
  - Total: 33.06 sq mi (85.62 km^{2})
  - Land: 32.53 sq mi (84.26 km^{2})
  - Water: 0.53 sq mi (1.36 km^{2})
- Elevation: 535 ft (163 m)

Population (2020)
  - Total: 20,159
  - Estimate (2023): 23,686
  - Density: 619.6/sq mi (239.2/km^{2})
- Demonym: Ennisite
- Time zone: UTC-6 (Central (CST))
  - Summer (DST): UTC-5 (CDT)
- ZIP codes: 75119-75120
- Area codes: 214, 469, 945, 972
- FIPS code: 48-24348
- GNIS feature ID: 2410443
- Website: www.ennistx.gov

Ennis (/ˈɛnɪs/) is a city in eastern Ellis County, Texas, United States. Its population was 20,159 according to the 2020 census, with an estimated population of 23,686 in 2023. Ennis is home to the annual National Polka Festival. It is part of the Dallas-Fort Worth metroplex.

== History ==
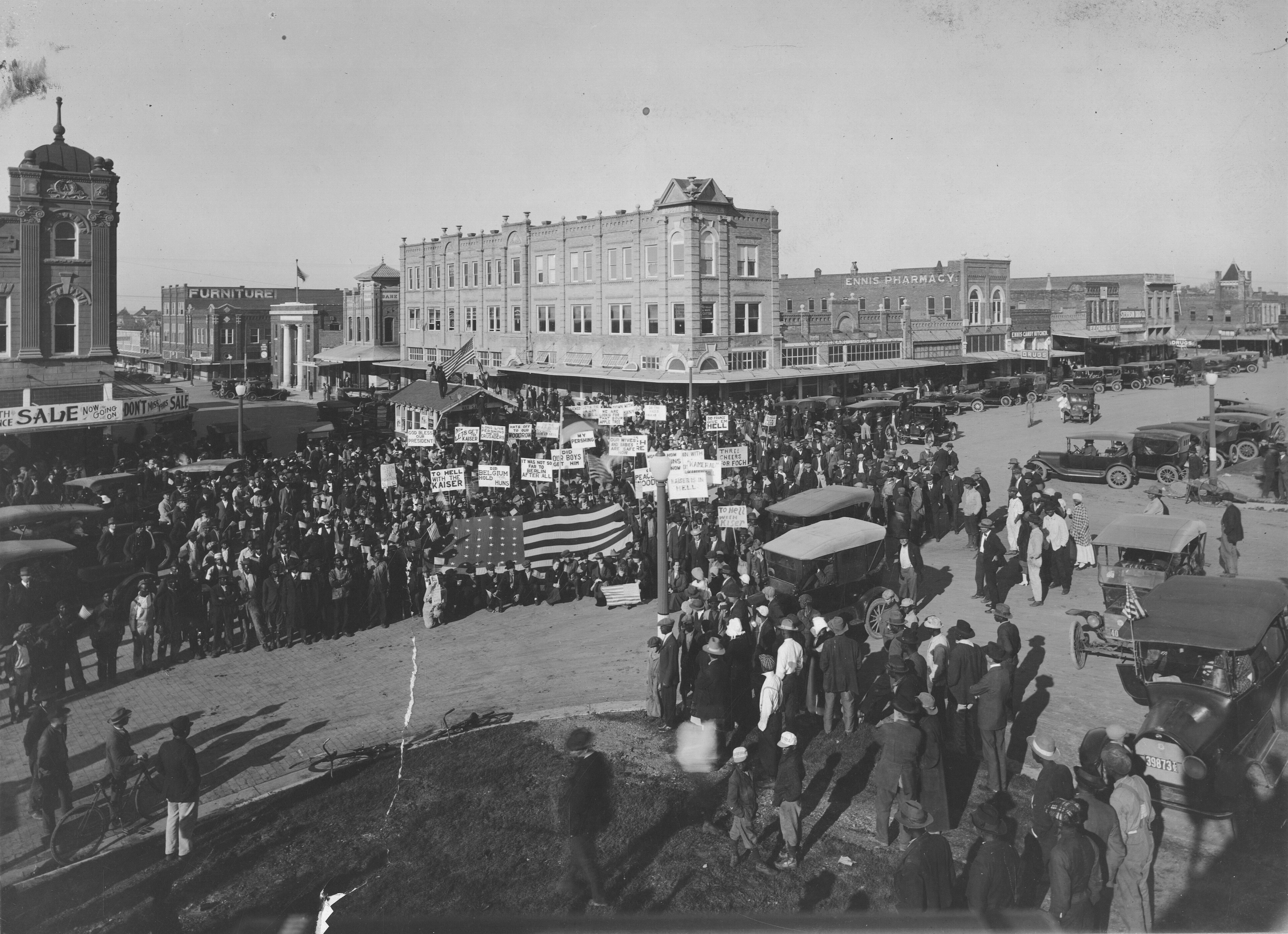
Ennisites celebrating the Armistice of World War I in 1918

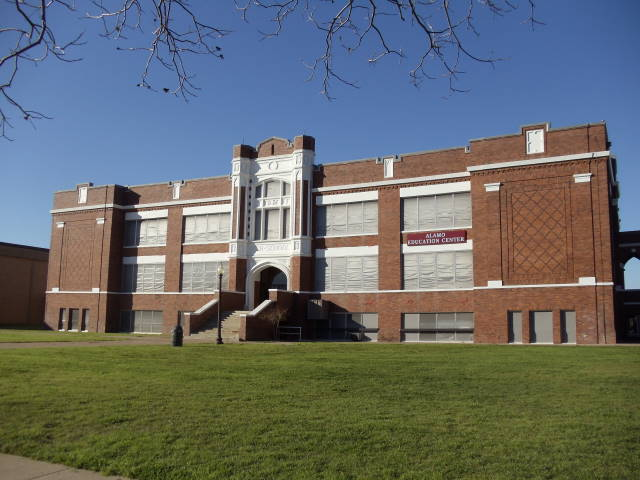
Built in 1916, Ennis High School operated in this building until 1982.

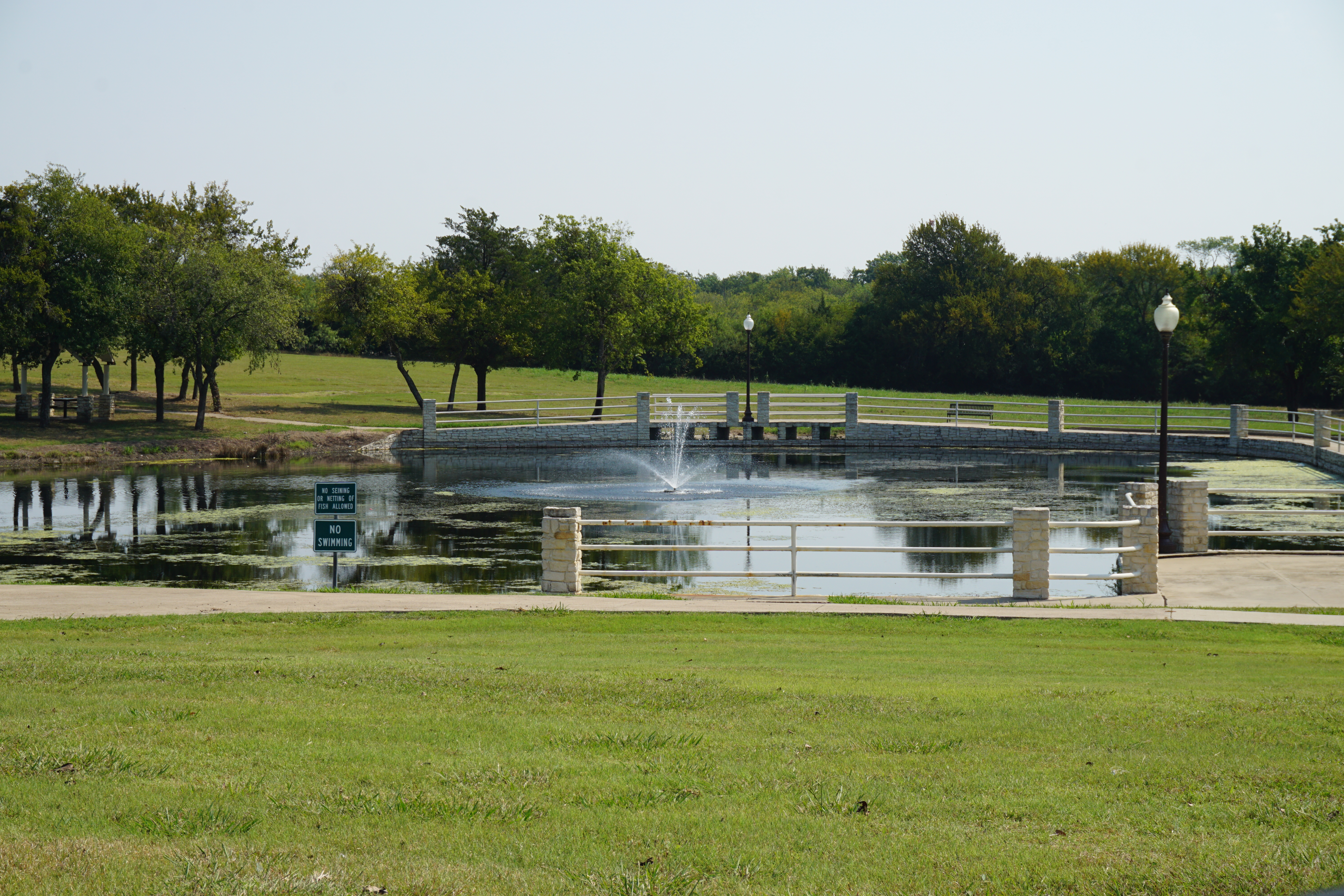
The fishing pond at Bluebonnet Park

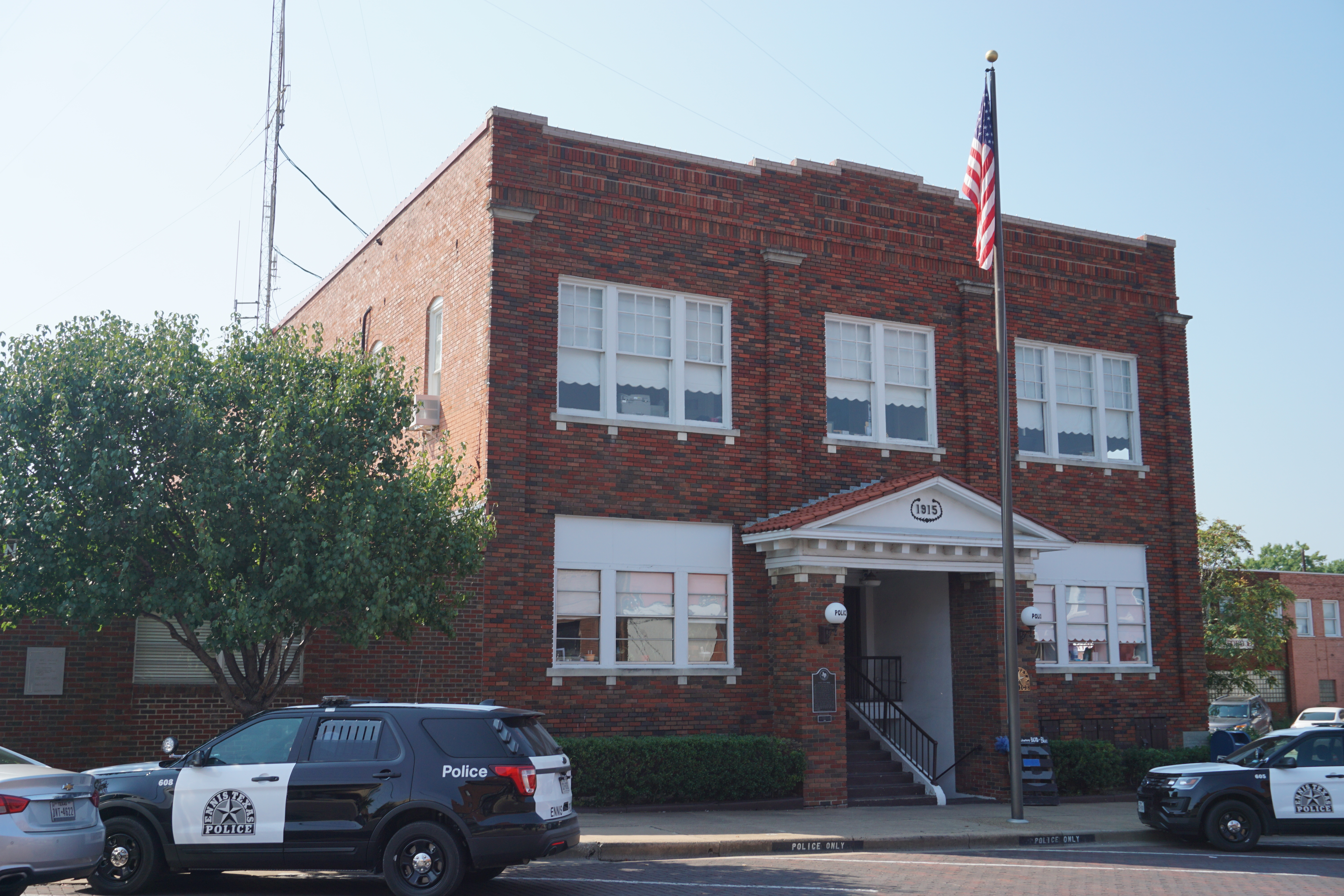
Old City Hall served as the main police and fire station until the public safety building was completed in 2020.

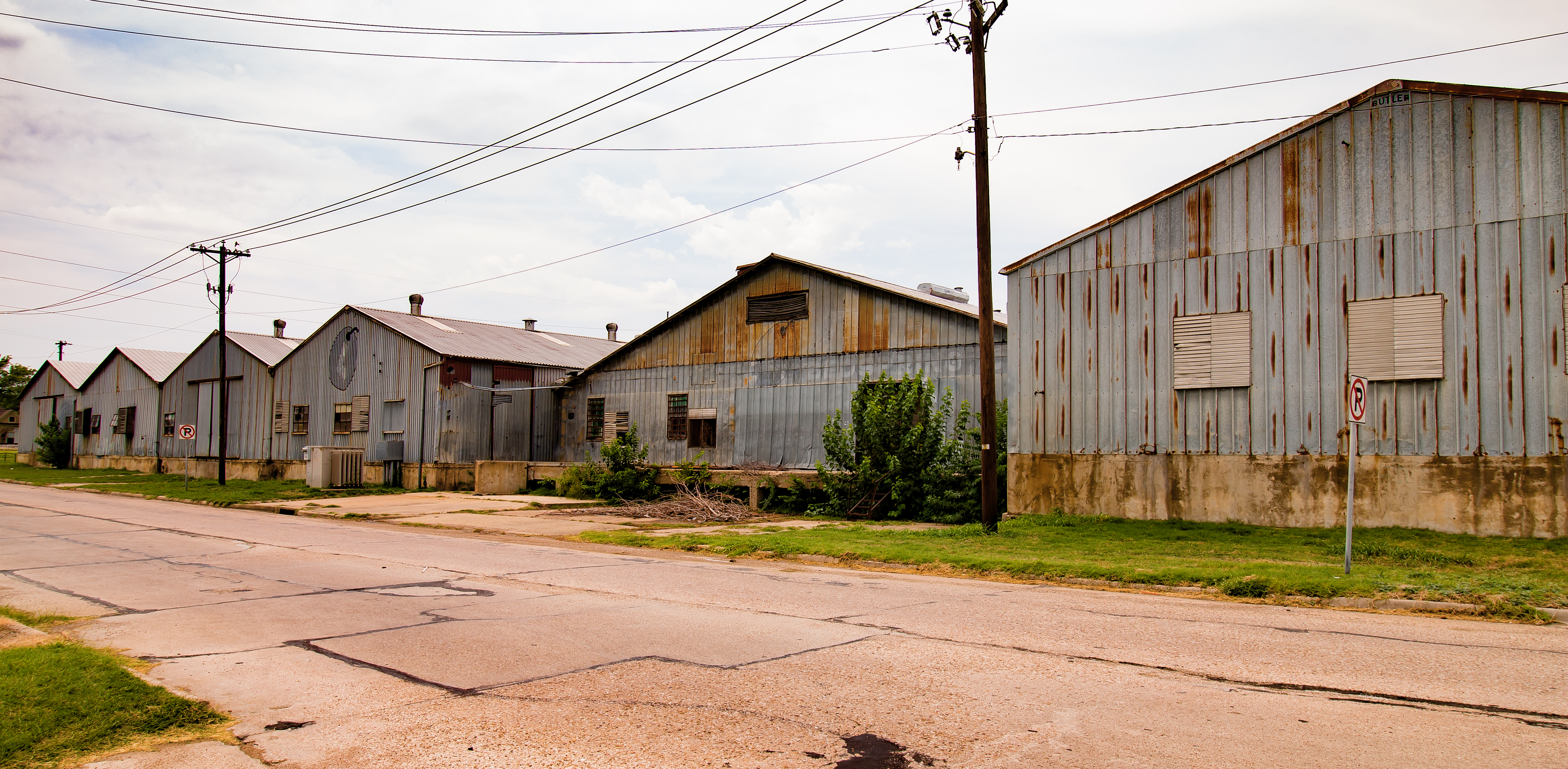
Historic cotton compresses in Ennis

In 1871, the Houston and Texas Central Railroad (H&TC) arrived at the spot that would become Ennis as it built north towards Dallas. The city was established that year and surveyed a year later. It is named after Cornelius Ennis, a founder of the H&TC Railroad.

Between 1874 and 1890, the population of Ennis grew tenfold from around 300 to 3,000. Many of the new settlers came from the war-torn European nations that later became Czechoslovakia. This early growth was attributed to the success of cotton production in the region, making Ennis a center of trade and commerce for both farmers and the railroad. The influx of Czech and Slovak migrants also shaped and transformed the cultural heritage of the community for years to come, making Ennis one of the largest Czech communities in Texas.

In 1891, the H&TC chose Ennis to be its northern division headquarters. The machine shops and roundhouse employed several hundred men. One condition of the agreement was that as long as Ennis was able to furnish water, the shops could not be moved from the community. The city built the first of three lakes for this purpose: Old City Lake in 1892, followed by New Lake in 1895, and Lake Clark (an extension of New Lake) in 1940. However, H&TC was later acquired by the Texas and New Orleans Railroad, a subsidiary of Southern Pacific, in 1934. While it no longer hosted the company headquarters, the shops and yard in Ennis remained and continued to be used as a hub for other lines and branches serving the city.

On July 14, 1902, the Corsicana Oil Citys of the Texas League moved that day's game against Texarkana to Ennis, due to Sunday blue laws in Coriscana. Future major-leaguer Nig Clarke set an all-time record by hitting eight home runs in 10 at-bats in a 51–3 victory. (Clarke was helped mightily by the fact that Ennis' tiny ballpark featured a right field fence only about 210 feet from home plate.)

The expansion of the cotton industry supplemented by the railroad provided access to foreign and domestic markets through the port of Houston. By 1920, 152,601 bales of cotton were ginned and shipped from Ellis County, the most of any county in America. In part to the city's significant contribution, the Ennis Chamber of Commerce adopted the slogan "Where Railroads and Cotton Fields Meet". These two industries - trade and cotton production - produced immense wealth for the community that could be seen in the residential development of the city. Lawyers, doctors, businessmen, and other wealthy residents built churches of many different denominations and numerous fraternal organizations met regularly. Elegant houses along "the Avenue" and north were accompanied by dozens of Folk Victorian houses and Craftsman-style bungalows. These Victorian houses and Craftsman bungalows in the northwestern part of the city eventually became a part of the Templeton-McCanless Residential Historic District.

By the mid-20th century, Ennis had become a modern community with schools, three movie theaters, several drugstores, banks, and automobile dealerships. Descendants of early settlers had developed new traditions such as the National Polka Festival and the Ennis Bluebonnet Trail. Moreover, the city was connected to Dallas to the north and Houston to the south by Interstate Highway 45.

The commercial strip along Ennis Ave. between downtown and Interstate 45 was hit by a tornado on May 15, 2013, rendering four homes uninhabitable and damaging as many as 55 businesses. The damage caused by the tornado impacted the National Register Historic District, with some of its historic buildings facing demolition, but demolition was opposed by local community leaders and activists. As a result, these damaged buildings were sold by the city to developers, with the intention of repairing the buildings. Further restoration and revitalization plans were implemented in the Downtown Comprehensive Plan, and the city was admitted to the Texas Main Street Program in January 2015. In recent years, Ennis has seen a boost in its economy and its downtown area has been revitalized.

Ennis was part of the path of totality during the Solar eclipse of April 8, 2024, with the centerline of the eclipse passing through the northern part of the town. In celebration of the eclipse, Ennis threw a large festival, attempting to attract more visitors to the town and further bolster the economy. The city experienced 4 minutes and 23 seconds of totality.

=== Railroads in Ennis ===
Throughout the city's history, railroads have been instrumental in the community's early economic boom and supplemented the city's growth for over a century. Three railroads initially laid tracks and operated to and from Ennis—the Houston and Texas Central (H&TC) running north to southeast, the Texas Midland Railroad spurring to the northeast, and the Waxahachie Tap Railroad—later known as the Central Texas and Northwestern Railroad (CT&N)—coming in from the northwest. The CT&N was merged into the H&TC by the early 1900s and both remaining railroads serving the city were merged into the Texas and New Orleans Railroad in 1934, eventually merging into its parent company Southern Pacific Railroad by 1961. In 1996, Southern Pacific merged into Union Pacific Railroad, which now serves as the sole rail operator in the city, maintaining a yard and local base of operations for the Ennis Subdivision.

The construction of the HT&C was directly responsible for the early development of the city. Not only was the community strategically located in the middle of the Blackland Prairie, but also it was located along the proposed H&TC line from Houston to Dallas—the first rail connection between both cities. However, the railroad's decision to establish Ennis meant that the nearby town of Burnham—located five miles south near the present-day community of Ensign—would be bypassed. The issue of this decision presented itself when many businesses in Burnham were attracted to the railroad and relocated to Ennis. As a result, a mob of angry residents reacted violently to the railroad's bypass and attacked citizens in the city of Ennis, killing one and injuring several others. Burnham, an otherwise well-planned and relatively developed city, eventually declined and become a ghost town in the coming decades.

In 1870—as the H&TC was laying track in Ellis County—residents of the neighboring city of Waxahachie refused to give bonds to the railroad and resisted the development of a rail link to the system. After the railroad brought significant growth to Ennis and the decline of the bypassed community of Burnham took hold, attitudes changes as opportunistic businessmen and lawmakers chartered the Waxahachie Tap Railroad to link Waxahachie to the H&TC in an effort to reap some of the economic benefits. Construction was completed in 1879, establishing a 13-mile connection across Ellis County between both cities. In 1881, the railroad was reorganized into the Central Texas and Northwestern Railway and secured state legislation permitting the railroad to build out west into the Panhandle, but no further construction was made on the railroad. Eventually, the CT&N was merged into the H&TC in 1901.

In 1882, the H&TC began construction on a spur line to span over 100 miles from Ennis to the city of Paris, Texas, linking a southern terminus of the St. Louis and San Francisco Railroad. This would bypass the city of Dallas and provide a direct link from St. Louis, Missouri, to the port cities of Houston and Galveston. However, in 1885—just three years into construction—the H&TC went into receivership after only building half of the line, stopping just south of the city of Quinlan. In 1892, the Texas Midland Railroad was chartered by businesswoman Hetty Green, who purchased the northeastern spur from the H&TC. The link between the cities of Ennis and Paris finally was made 13 years later.

After a decade of operation, the Texas Midland was bought out by parties interested in a link and partnership between the Frisco Line and Rock Island Line. Plans were announced to build a line 65 miles south from Ennis to Waco to connect with the recently established Burlington-Rock Island Railroad, a joint venture of the Rock Island Line and Burlington Route. The potential of Ennis becoming a major railroad hub and junction was significant, and could have significantly boosted its already booming development. However, this southern extension never came to fruition and the Texas Midland eventually was bought out and annexed by Southern Pacific in 1928, which leased the line to its subsidiary Texas and New Orleans Railroad. In 1934, the T&NO fully acquired both the Texas Midland and the HT&C, dissolving both companies in a merger to consolidate the H&TC line into the Southern Pacific system and fully abandon the Texas Midland route. While Ennis continued to see T&NO service to Dallas and Houston, the northeastern spur from Ennis to Paris sat abandoned and unused for almost a decade. A washout of the bridge spanning the Trinity River led to the official abandonment and decommissioning of the line between Ennis and Kaufman in 1942.

The city was also served by the Texas Electric Railway, an extensive interurban railway network in North Texas that stretched over 200 miles at its peak. The line historically ran through Ennis at street level along Dallas Street before running parallel to the T&NO tracks outside of the city center. From 1913 to 1941, Ennis was a stop along the Dallas-Corsicana Line, but the rise of the automobile, decline in ridership, and the economic strain of World War II led to the suspension of service and closure of the line. Like the Texas Midland's spur along Breckenridge Street, the interurban line ran along Dallas Street and was likewise paved over after service was suspended. However, these tracks were revealed and partially restored during street renovations in the late 2010s.

By the mid-20th century, the significance of the railroad began to decline in the city, as the postwar boom of the midcentury favored the automobile over the locomotive. Texas and New Orleans' Sunbeam and Hustler services were cut in 1955 and 1957, respectively, after serving the city since the T&NO's takeover of the H&TC. Passenger service did not return to Ennis, as attempts by Amtrak to restore service to the city were largely unsuccessful. Ten years after the T&NO's merger into Southern Pacific in 1961, Southern Pacific initially resisted attempts to route the Lone Star along the line through Ennis in the early 1970s. In 1989, a spur of the Texas Eagle—the successor of the Lone Star service—running from Dallas to Houston ran nonstop through the city during the alternate service's three-year stint in the early 1990s. Shortly after in 1996, Southern Pacific merged into Union Pacific, which has since been the sole railroad operating in the city. Union Pacific went on to commemorate the city's significant railroad history by honoring the legacy of its local yard workers—some of whom were fourth- and fifth-generation railroaders - in awarding the city a membership to the company's Train Town USA registry in 2013.

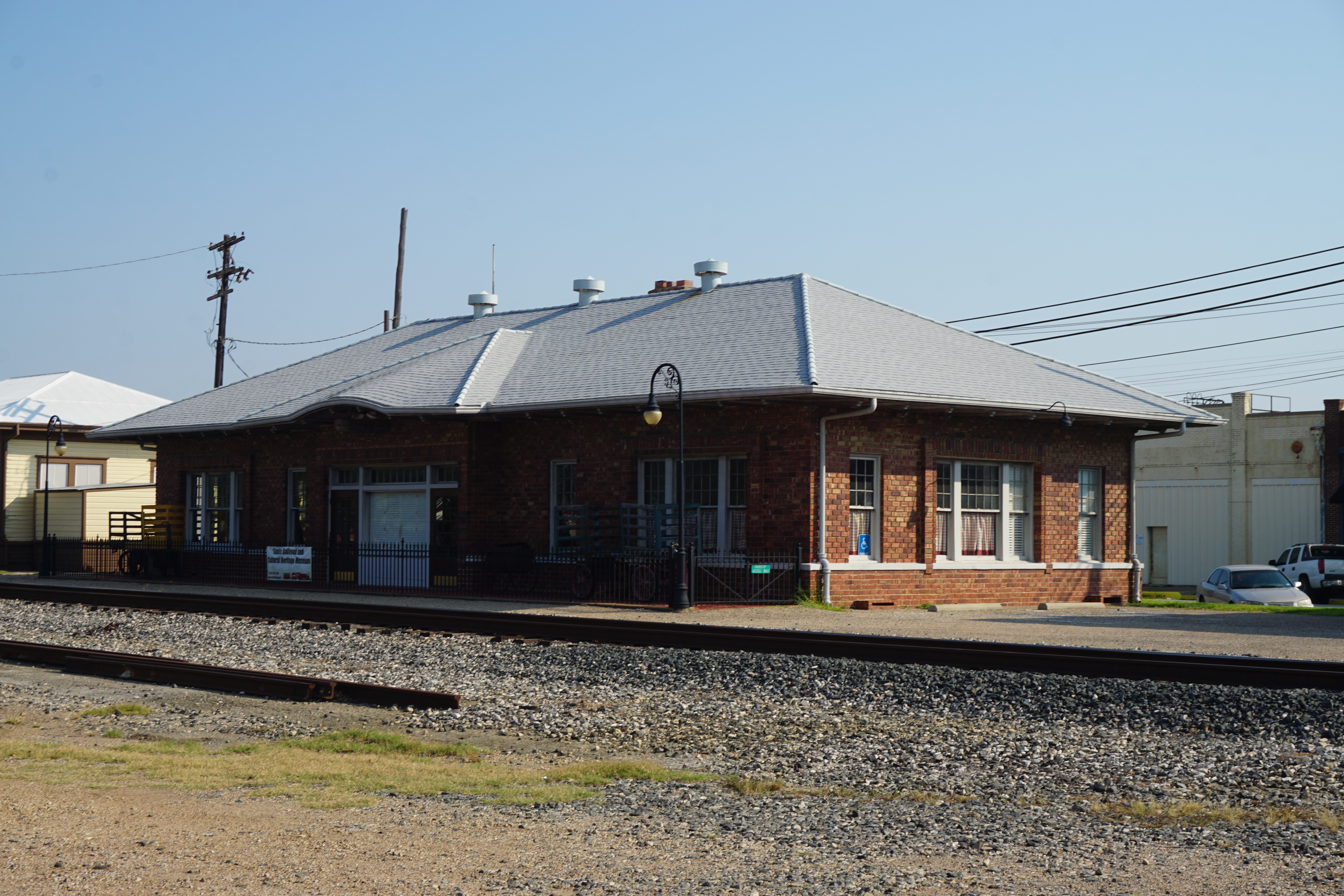
Ennis Railroad and Cultural Heritage Museum located in former railway station

=== Templeton-McCanless Historic District ===
The Templeton-McCanless Residential Historic District is named in honor of two notable figures instrumental in the early development of the city, one of whom, Hix McCanless, was the architect for several early homes built in Ennis from the late 19th to early 20th centuries. Because of the city's economic boom and the general prosperity of the Gilded Age, many of these early homes were built indulgently with ornate details and great levels of craftsmanship in adherence to the premodern architectural styles of the time—namely in the Neoclassical, American Craftsman, and Folk Victorian styles. However, many of these original homes were lost to neglect, demolition, fire, and careless renovation during the 20th century, precipitating the need to preserve the locally historic significance of those remaining. The historic district was created in 1986 after five years of grassroots efforts from the Ennis Heritage Society (now the Ennis Historical Society) and is now an officially registered district in the National Register of Historic Places dedicated to the protection and preservation of these homes. Today, dozens of homes are historically preserved in their original style. Some of the homes have been named after the architect of the house or the family name of its first residents.

== Geography ==
Ennis is in the northeastern region of Texas, in eastern Ellis County. Interstate 45 passes through the east side of the city, with access from exits 247 through 255. I-45 leads north 35 miles (56 km) to Dallas and south 205 miles (330 km) to Houston. U.S. Route 287 curves around the south side of Ennis and leads northwest 15 miles (24 km) to Waxahachie, the Ellis County seat. Texas State Highway 34 passes through the center of Ennis, leading northeast 26 miles (42 km) to Kaufman and southwest 20 miles (32 km) to Italy. Waco is 73 miles (117 km) to the southwest.

Ennis has a total area of 28.2 square miles (73.0 km^{2}), of which 0.54 sq mi (1.4 km^{2}), or 1.85%, is covered by water.

=== Climate ===
The climate in this area is characterized by hot, humid summers and generally mild to cool winters. According to the Köppen climate classification, Ennis has a humid subtropical climate, Cfa on climate maps.

== Demographics ==
Historical population
Census	Pop.	Note	%±
1880	1,351		—
1890	2,171		60.7%
1900	4,919		126.6%
1910	5,669		15.2%
1920	7,224		27.4%
1930	7,069		−2.1%
1940	7,087		0.3%
1950	7,815		10.3%
1960	9,347		19.6%
1970	11,046		18.2%
1980	12,102		9.6%
1990	14,278		18.0%
2000	16,454		15.2%
2010	18,513		12.5%
2020	20,159		8.9%
2023 (est.)	23,686		17.5%

=== 2020 census ===
As of the 2020 census, Ennis had a population of 20,159, 6,901 households, and 4,985 families residing in the city.

The median age was 33.0 years; 28.4% of residents were under the age of 18 and 13.8% of residents were 65 years of age or older. For every 100 females there were 95.3 males, and for every 100 females age 18 and over there were 89.9 males age 18 and over.

94.6% of residents lived in urban areas, while 5.4% lived in rural areas.

Of those households, 40.5% had children under the age of 18 living in them; 47.3% were married-couple households, 16.1% were households with a male householder and no spouse or partner present, and 29.7% were households with a female householder and no spouse or partner present. About 23.4% of all households were made up of individuals and 10.1% had someone living alone who was 65 years of age or older.

There were 7,303 housing units, of which 5.5% were vacant. The homeowner vacancy rate was 1.7% and the rental vacancy rate was 5.6%.

Racial composition as of the 2020 census
Race	Number	Percent
White	9,677	48.0%
Black or African American	2,834	14.1%
American Indian and Alaska Native	178	0.9%
Asian	123	0.6%
Native Hawaiian and Other Pacific Islander	87	0.4%
Some other race	4,085	20.3%
Two or more races	3,175	15.7%
Hispanic or Latino (of any race)	8,682	43.1%

== Arts and culture ==
=== Events ===
The National Polka Festival, founded in 1967, commemorates the city's Czech Texan culture.

The Bluebonnet Trails Festival celebrates the state flower of Texas and the bloom of wildflowers in the surrounding countryside.

Unity One Blues on Main Summer Music Festival is a jazz and blues festival hosted in June; Ennis Freedom Fest is a parade and firework show celebrating the 4th of July; the Fall Festival and Monster Mash Dash 5k Marathon are hosted in October; and the Lights of Ennis Festival, the Parade of Lights, and Our Lady of Guadalupe Procession are hosted in December during the Christmas season.

=== Attractions ===
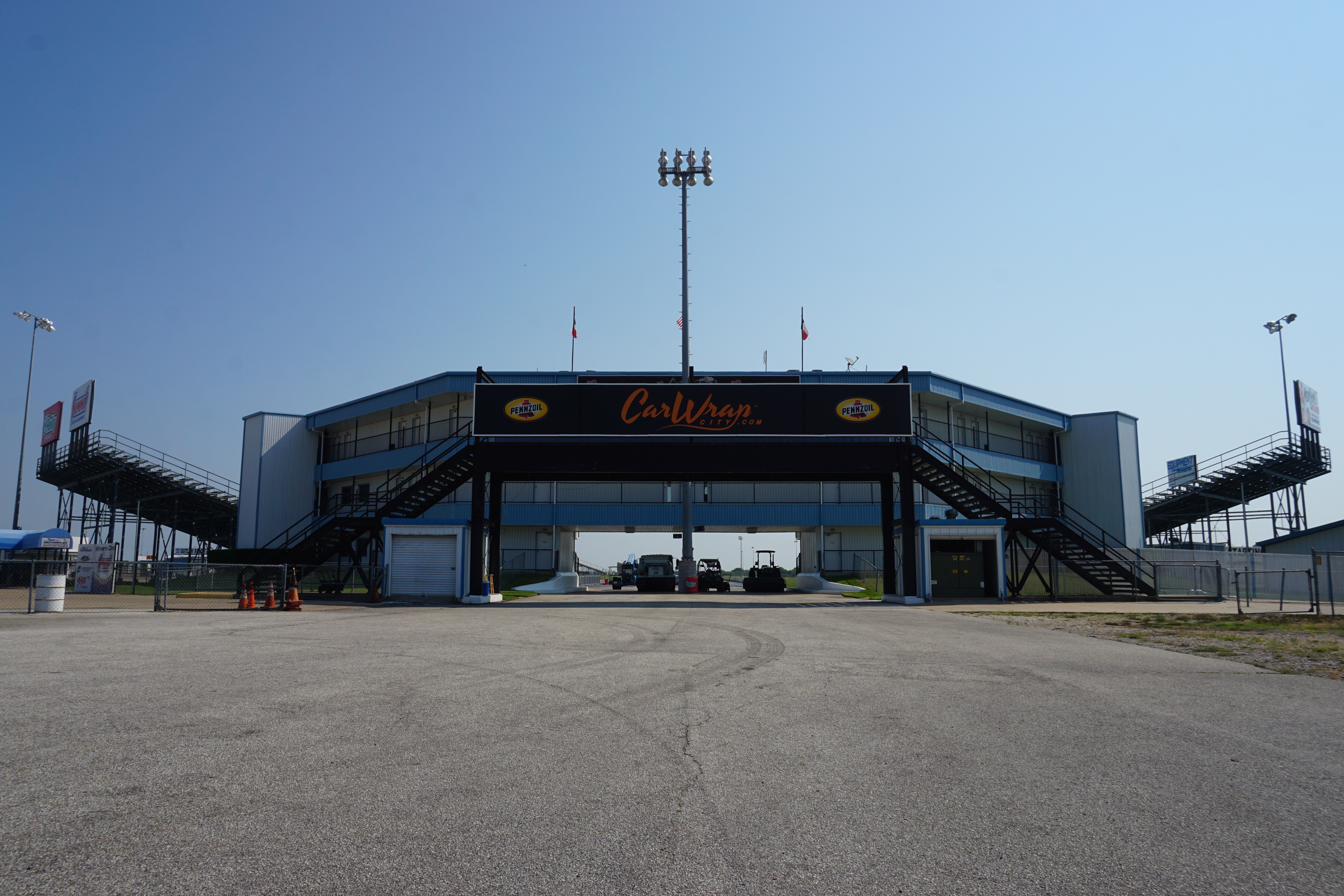
Main gate and pressbox at Texas Motorplex

Lake Bardwell is a reservoir managed by the U.S. Army Corps of Engineers, located southwest of Ennis. It is a flood-control reservoir in the Trinity River Basin and a conservation pool in the Trinity Valley Authority. Surrounding the lake is a park system consisting of Big Mustang Creek Park, Little Mustang Creek Park, High View Park, Love Park, Mott Park, and Highview Marina, all of which offer boat ramps. The lake and parks offer hiking, horseback riding, camping, fishing, and sport boating.

Texas Motorplex in Ennis is a quarter-mile drag-racing facility built in 1986 by former funny car driver Billy Meyer. It hosts the annual NHRA FallNationals in October, when hundreds of professional and amateur drag racers compete.

Galaxy Drive-In Theatre first opened in 2004 with only three screens. Sixteen years later, it had expanded to seven screens, featuring the newest films Hollywood has to offer. All the films shown at the Galaxy Drive-In Theatre are projected digitally, and in certain instances, in 3-D, a rarity in the world of drive-in cinema. Galaxy Drive-In is open 365 days a year.

Ennis Railroad and Cultural Heritage Museum is housed in the former Van Noy Restaurant building. The museum's collections include railroad and cultural memorabilia, including items related to the Houston and Central Texas Railroad, a large diorama of the old engine roundhouse that once existed just north of the museum's location, a large collection of rare china, and an MKT caboose.

Kachina Prairie is a city park preserving one of the last remaining examples of untouched Texas Blackland Prairie. The first Ennis bluebonnet trail was marked through this area in 1938.

=== City Hall ===
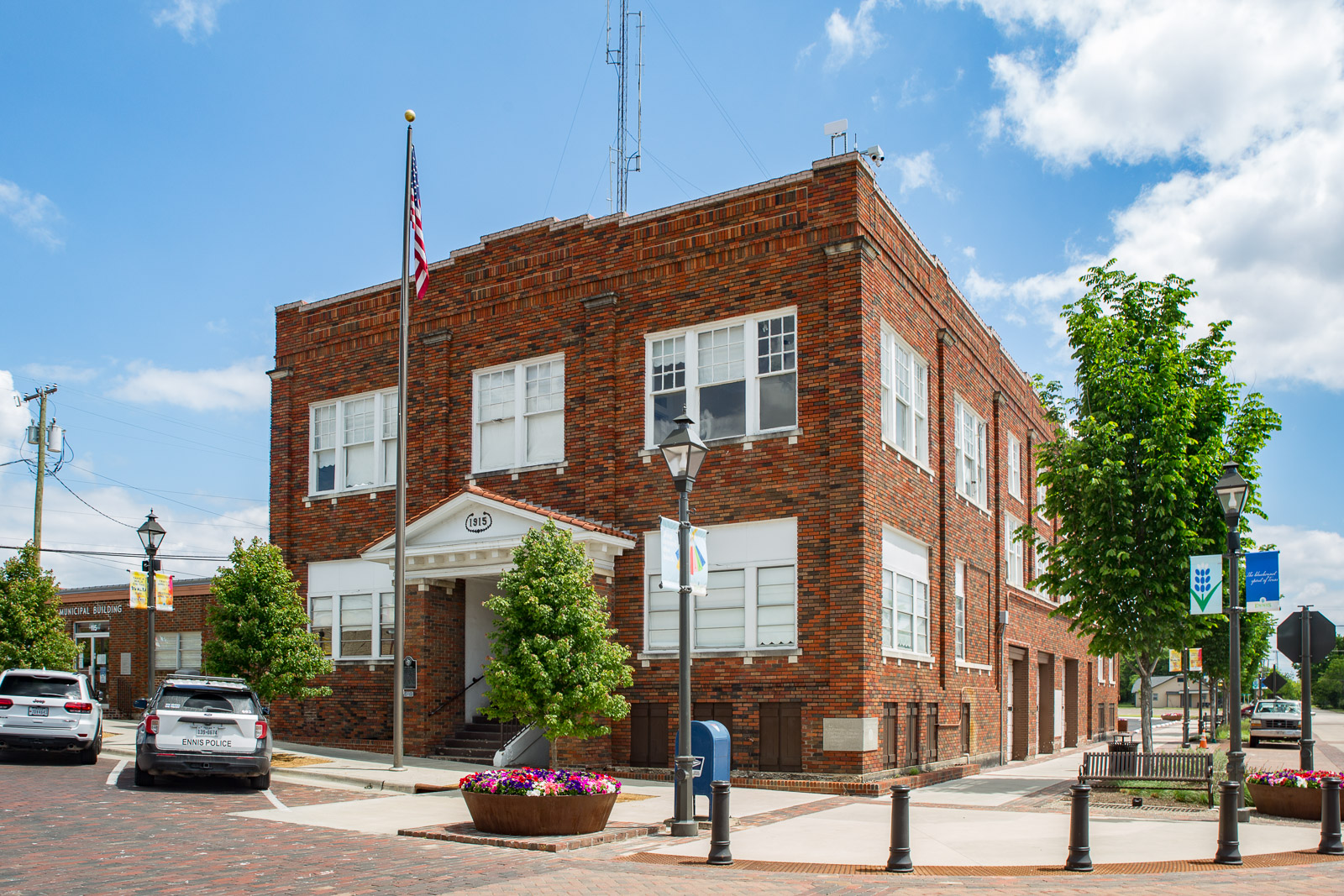
Ennis city hall

Ennis City Hall is the seat of municipal government of Ennis. It is located at 119 W. Brown Street. The current building was completed in 1950, and was listed on the National Register of Historic Places in 1986, and was also designated a Recorded Texas Historic Landmark in 1985.

The building was designed in the Classical Revival style by Hix McCanless in 1950.

== Government ==
The city of Ennis has a city commissioner/city manager government type, with several commissioners representing different wards of the city government in city council. The city is also one of the largest incorporated cities in the United States that continues to elect its city marshal. The mayor is Kameron Raburn.

== Education ==
Education is administered by the Ennis Independent School District, which consists of two early childhood centers, four elementary schools, two intermediate schools, one junior high, and Ennis High School. Secondary education offers several extracurricular programs, such as University Interscholastic League academics and sports, Technology Student Association, and the National FFA Organization. Junior high and high school sports include baseball, football, basketball, volleyball, tennis, cross-country running, track, powerlifting, softball, soccer, and golf.

== Media ==
Notable movies partially filmed in Ennis include Deadly Blessing (1981) and Walking Tall: The Payback (2007).

== Notable people ==
- Brothers Darrell Lance Abbott and Vincent Paul Abbott, musicians
- Ray Armstrong, college and professional football player
- Bob Banner, producer, co-producer of the Carol Burnett Show
- Clyde Barrow, partner in Bonnie and Clyde crime duo, resided in Ennis later in life..
- Alfred H. Bennett, district judge of the United States District Court for the Southern District of Texas
- Pam Bowers, college women's basketball coach
- Mark Busby, academic, novelist, and writer
- Gary Campbell, college football player and coach
- Steve Collins, college football player
- Chase Craig, writer-cartoonist, worked with Dell Comics and Gold Key Comics
- Jacobs Crawley, PRCA rodeo cowboy, 2015 world champion saddle bronc rider
- James "Red" Duke, trauma surgeon, professor, first surgeon to receive President Kennedy at Parkland Medical in Dallas
- Elliott with 2 Ts, drag queen
- Jack Fields, Republican representative of Texas's 8th congressional district
- Bob Finley, MLB catcher, Southwest Conference and American Football League
- Walt Furnace, Republican representative of the Alaska House of Representatives
- Tanya Godsey, musician, vocalist, and pianist
- Graham Harrell, NFL and college football player lived in Ennis
- Hattie Leah Henenberg, lawyer, judge, appointed to the All-Woman Supreme Court
- D. Van Holliday, theoretical and experimental physicist, acoustician
- Kirby Baxter Holmes, gospel musician and pastor, instrumental in Martin Luther King Jr.'s visit to Texas in 1959
- Charles Hudson, MLB starting pitcher
- Jack Lummus, Medal of Honor recipient, first lieutenant of the US Marine Corps
- Vincent Marshall, Canadian football player
- Hix McCanless, architect, surveyor, civil engineer
- Robert Randall Onstead, grocer and businessman, founder of Randall's Food Markets
- Ginger Rogers, actress, singer, dancer, lived in Ennis during childhood
- Rabon Tarrant, jump blues and jazz drummer, singer, and songwriter
- Ernest Tubb, The "Texas Troubadour", country music singer and songwriter
- Mary Walker, WPRA rodeo cowgirl, 2012 world champion barrel racer
- Edward Whitacre Jr., former chairman and CEO of AT&T Inc., General Motors
