= Thomas Kunz =

American biologist (1938–2020)

Thomas H. Kunz (June 11, 1938 – April 13, 2020) was an American biologist specializing in the study of bats. He was credited with coining the study of aeroecology; additionally, he wrote several fundamental textbooks and publications on bat ecology.

== Early life ==
Kunz grew up in Missouri. He credited his interest in biology to his fifth-grade teacher, who was passionate about silkworms.

== Education ==
Kunz received a Bachelor of Arts in biology in 1961 and Master of Arts in education in 1962 from the University of Central Missouri. He went on to receive another Master of Arts from Drake University in biology in 1968, and gained his Doctor of Philosophy from the University of Kansas in systematics and ecology in 1971.

== Career ==
Kunz taught high school in Kansas after receiving his MA in education. Kunz states that his first experience working with bats was before he attended Drake University. While caving, he and a friend encountered a banded bat. He called in the number on the band and later would collaborate with the professor who banded the bat. Kunz became a professor at Boston University in 1971.

Kunz edited or coedited six books on the biology and ecology of bats. His book Ecological and Behavioral Methods for the Study of Bats "is widely praised as one of the best resources available for professional bat researchers, educators and conservationists." He also helped establish the Tiputini Biodiversity Station in Ecuador in 1995 to promote the study of rainforest ecology.

He helped distinguish the new scientific discipline of aeroecology, which integrates geography, ecology, atmospheric science, and computational biology. A key concept of aeroecology is thinking of the aerosphere as part of the biosphere, as many organisms depend upon the aerosphere for resources. He conducted research on the ecosystem services of bats in a study published in Science, concluding that their services are worth $3–54 billion per year. He retired in 2011 after being seriously injured in an accident.

== Awards and honors ==
In 1984, he won the Gerritt S. Miller Award from the North American Society for Bat Research. In 2003, the University of Central Missouri presented him with their Distinguished Alumni Award, calling him "one of the world's leading mammalogists." In 2011, Kunz was named a Boston University William Fairfield Warren Distinguished Professor, which is its highest academic award. He is an elected Fellow of the American Association for the Advancement of Science and was formerly President of the American Society of Mammalogists. He was also a recipient of the C. Hart Merriam Award for his contributions to the field of mammalogy.

In 2015, Boston University began the Thomas H. Kunz Fund in Biology to "train the next generation of ecologists." PhD candidates in the Ecology, Behavior & Evolution program are eligible for the Thomas H. Kunz Award, which is a financial award from the Thomas H. Kunz Fund.

== Personal life and death ==
Kunz was married to Margaret Kunz. He had two children, Pamela and David. He died in April 2020, of complications from COVID-19 in Dedham, Massachusetts during the COVID-19 pandemic in Massachusetts.

== Selected publications ==
- Nowak, R. M., Walker, E. P., Kunz, T. H., & Pierson, E. D. (1994). Walker's bats of the world. JHU Press. ISBN 0801849861
- Kunz, T. H., & Fenton, M. B. (Eds.). (2005). Bat ecology. University of Chicago Press. ISBN 0226462072
- Kunz, Thomas H.; Arnett, Edward B.; Erickson, Wallace P.; Hoar, Alexander R.; Johnson, Gregory D.; Larkin, Ronald P.; Strickland, M Dale; Thresher, Robert W.; Tuttle, Merlin D. (2007). "Ecological impacts of wind energy development on bats: Questions, research needs, and hypotheses". Frontiers in Ecology and the Environment. 5 (6): 315. doi:10.1890/1540-9295(2007)5[315:EIOWED]2.0.CO;2.
- Kunz, T. H.; Gauthreaux, S. A.; Hristov, N. I.; Horn, J. W.; Jones, G.; Kalko, E. K. V.; Larkin, R. P.; McCracken, G. F.; Swartz, S. M.; Srygley, R. B.; Dudley, R.; Westbrook, J. K.; Wikelski, M. (2007). "Aeroecology: Probing and modeling the aerosphere". Integrative and Comparative Biology. 48 (1): 1–11. CiteSeerX 10.1.1.514.7177. doi:10.1093/icb/icn037. PMID 21669768.
- Kunz, T. H., & Parsons, S. (2009). Ecological and behavioral methods for the study of bats. Johns Hopkins University Press. ISBN 0801891477.
- Kunz, Thomas H.; Braun De Torrez, Elizabeth; Bauer, Dana; Lobova, Tatyana; Fleming, Theodore H. (2011). "Ecosystem services provided by bats". Annals of the New York Academy of Sciences. 1223 (1): 1–38. Bibcode:2011NYASA1223....1K. doi:10.1111/j.1749-6632.2011.06004.x. PMID 21449963.
- Boyles, Justin G.; Cryan, Paul M.; McCracken, Gary F.; Kunz, Thomas H. (2011). "Economic Importance of Bats in Agriculture". Science. 332 (6025): 41–42. Bibcode:2011Sci...332...41B. doi:10.1126/science.1201366. PMID 21454775.

== See also ==
- Sturnira perla – a species of bat described by Kunz
