= Pamela Barnes (artist) =

New Zealand artist

Pamela Barnes (1937 – 1975) was a New Zealand artist. Her work is in the permanent collection of the Christchurch Art Gallery.

== Biography ==
Barnes exhibited at the Canterbury Society of Arts from 1970 to 1975. Her work in the Christchurch Art Gallery includes landscapes of Lyttelton Harbour and Banks Peninsula and of scenes in Scotland.
