= Pam Kehaly =

American health insurance executive

- Born: Pamela Noordewier
- Education: B.S. Business Administration, California State University, Stanislaus; Honorary Doctorate, Northern Arizona University (2024)
- Occupations: Health insurance executive; Business executive
- Employer: Blue Cross Blue Shield of Arizona
- Known for: President and CEO of Blue Cross Blue Shield of Arizona; Vivity joint venture
- Title: President and Chief Executive Officer

Pamela "Pam" Kehaly is an American health insurance executive who serves as President and Chief Executive Officer of Blue Cross Blue Shield of Arizona (AZ Blue), the state's largest locally-owned health insurer. With more than 30 years of experience in the health insurance industry spanning Blue Cross of California, Aetna, and Anthem, Inc., she is recognized as a prominent leader in both the Arizona business community and the national healthcare industry.

== Early life and education ==
Kehaly earned a Bachelor of Science degree in Business Administration from California State University, Stanislaus. In 2024, she received an Honorary Doctorate from Northern Arizona University (NAU) — the university's highest academic honor — in recognition of her distinguished service to the healthcare industry and the state of Arizona.

== Career ==
=== Blue Cross of California (1986 onward) ===
Kehaly began her career in 1986 at Blue Cross of California, where she held a variety of roles spanning operations and profit-and-loss management.

=== Aetna ===
Before returning to the Blue Cross and Blue Shield system, Kehaly served as President of National Accounts at Aetna, where she was responsible for nine million members across Aetna's West Region National Accounts division.

=== Anthem, Inc. (through 2017) ===
Kehaly spent more than 25 years at Anthem, Inc. — Blue Cross Blue Shield's largest licensee — rising through a series of senior positions across multiple states. She served as President of the Anthem Blue Cross plan in California, and the Anthem Blue Cross and Blue Shield plans in Colorado and Nevada. Her appointment as President and General Manager of Anthem Blue Cross of California was reported by Fierce Healthcare in 2010.

She ultimately served as President of Anthem's West Region — encompassing affiliated Blue Cross and/or Blue Shield health plans across eight states (California, Colorado, Indiana, Kentucky, Missouri, Nevada, Ohio, and Wisconsin) — and its Specialty business lines, including dental, vision, life, disability, workers' compensation, and voluntary benefits. In this capacity, she was responsible for approximately $20 billion in annual revenue.

==== Vivity ====
During her tenure as Anthem's West Region president, Kehaly was the driving force behind Vivity, described at its launch as a first-of-its-kind joint venture between an insurer and seven major hospital systems in Southern California — Cedars-Sinai Health System, Good Samaritan Hospital, UCLA Health, MemorialCare Health System, PIH Health, Torrance Memorial Medical Center, and Huntington Memorial Hospital — structured to align financial incentives around better patient outcomes. Modern Healthcare covered the initiative extensively across multiple articles in 2014, describing the venture as a novel effort to challenge Kaiser Permanente's dominance in the California market by combining insurer and provider capabilities without single ownership.

The venture attracted CalPERS — the second-largest buyer of health benefits in the country, representing more than 1.3 million state and local government employees — as an early adopter. Kehaly announced Vivity would offer premiums lower than existing market rates, with no deductibles, and a network of 6,000 doctors and 14 hospitals. Modern Healthcare followed up on the venture's progress in 2015.

In 2016, Kehaly was selected as a featured panelist at Modern Healthcare's Issue Briefing in San Diego, titled "From Volume to Value," alongside the CEOs of Scripps Health and Sharp Healthcare.

==== Patient Safety First ====
Kehaly was also a senior leader in Patient Safety First (PSF), a collaborative involving Anthem, the National Health Foundation, and California's regional hospital associations. In its first three years, PSF's work helped reduce early elective deliveries and hospital-acquired infections, contributing to an estimated 3,576 fewer deaths and more than $63 million in avoided unnecessary costs.

==== California public service ====
During her time in California, Kehaly served on Governor Jerry Brown's Let's Get Healthy California Task Force, which was convened to develop a long-term vision and framework for improving the health of all Californians.

=== Blue Cross Blue Shield of Arizona (2017–present) ===
In October 2017, Kehaly was named President and CEO of Blue Cross Blue Shield of Arizona (BCBSAZ), succeeding Richard L. Boals, who had retired after 45 years with the company. She officially assumed the role in November 2017. Her appointment was covered by both Becker's Hospital Review and Becker's Payer Issues.

Under her leadership, AZ Blue — which employs more than 3,200 people and serves more than 2 million members — rose to the number one market share position in Arizona, achieving 23% growth by emphasizing consumer-focused strategy and company culture. The company has been recognized on Modern Healthcare's Best Places to Work in Healthcare list, with Kehaly directly quoted in Modern Healthcare's 2024 feature on the award, and named a Most Admired Company by Arizona Business Magazine.

In March 2022, Kehaly was interviewed by Fawn Lopez, publisher of Modern Healthcare, as part of the publication's "Fridays with Fawn" executive interview series.

In 2020, Becker's published a feature interview with Kehaly on the evolving relationship between payers and hospitals during the COVID-19 pandemic, in which she called for greater government, payer, and hospital collaboration.

==== COVID-19 vaccination effort ====
Kehaly mobilized BCBSAZ's workforce to help launch two state-run COVID-19 vaccination sites. Over a three-month period, BCBSAZ managed more than 145,000 volunteer hours and helped facilitate more than 491,000 vaccines for Arizonans. She also served on U.S. Senator Mark Kelly's COVID-19 working group.

==== Mobilize AZ and the BCBSAZ Foundation ====
In 2018, Kehaly spearheaded the launch of Mobilize AZ, a statewide initiative designed to address substance use disorder, mental health, and diabetes in Arizona through cross-sector community partnerships. AZ Blue contributed over $10 million through related efforts to combat the opioid crisis in Arizona. In 2022, the initiative evolved into the Blue Cross Blue Shield of Arizona Foundation for Community Health & Advancement, a formal philanthropic entity focused on mental health, substance use disorder, chronic conditions, and health equity.

==== Prosano Health Solutions ====
In 2023, BCBSAZ launched Prosano Health Solutions, a care delivery subsidiary operating Advanced Primary Care Centers across Arizona. The launch was covered by Fierce Healthcare. By 2024, Prosano's nine clinic locations were reporting outcomes including 28% fewer emergency room visits and 15% fewer hospitalizations among enrolled members compared to non-Prosano commercial members, with cost savings of approximately $130 per member per month and a 95% net promoter score from patients.

== Public service and civic involvement ==
Kehaly was appointed by the Governor of Arizona and confirmed by the Arizona State Senate to serve as a member of the Arizona Board of Regents, the governing board for Arizona's three public universities (Arizona State University, Northern Arizona University, and the University of Arizona).

She has also served on U.S. Senator Mark Kelly's Health Advisory Board, Phoenix Mayor Kate Gallego's Go Bond Commission, and Arizona Secretary of State Adrian Fontes' business advisory board.

== Board memberships and affiliations ==
Kehaly has served on a number of corporate, nonprofit, and advisory boards, including:

- Chair, Greater Phoenix Leadership
- Board of Directors, Arizona Commerce Authority (including Executive Committee)
- Board of Directors, UNS Energy
- Board of Trustees, Arizona Multiple Sclerosis Foundation
- Board of Directors, Translational Genomics Research Institute (TGen)
- Board of Directors, National Institute for Health Care Management (NIHCM)
- Board of Directors, Phoenix Police Reserve Foundation
- Board of Directors, HealthCorps
- Board of Directors, TriWest Healthcare Alliance
- Board of Directors, Geisinger Health
- Advisory Board, Schaeffer Center for Health Policy and Economics, University of Southern California
- Member, CCI Inc.

== Recognition and awards ==
Year	Award / Recognition	Awarding Organization
2017+	Most Admired Leaders	Phoenix Business Journal
2017+	Most Influential Women in Arizona	Arizona Business Magazine
2021	Leader of the Year	Arizona Capitol Times
2024	Honorary Doctorate	Northern Arizona University
2025	50 Most Powerful People in Arizona Business	Az Business Magazine / AZ Big Media
