= Pamela Spitzmueller =

American conservator and book artist (1950–2025)

Pamela Spitzmueller (October 7, 1950 – March 13, 2025) was an American conservator and book artist. Born in Chicago, Illinois in 1950, she attended the University of Illinois Chicago and then studied with the book conservator Gary Frost. She worked in the conservation departments of the Library of Congress, the Newberry Library, the University of Iowa Libraries, and Harvard Library, where she was Chief Conservator for Special Collections.

Spitzmueller also created artists' books. Her work has been included in many exhibitions, including a solo exhibition in 2013 at the Center for Book Arts entitled "Pamela Spitzmueller: Fold=Trans=Form". Her work was in the National Museum of Women in the Arts (NMWA) and the Yale University Art Gallery.

Spitzmueller's papers are held in the Pam Spitzmueller Collection at the University of Iowa Libraries. The collection included her "bookbindings, conservation work (including Harvey's 1628 De motu cordis and the Nag Hammadi codices), research notebooks, personal journals, correspondence, and book arts scholarship." Spitzmueller died on March 13, 2025, at the age of 74.
