= Pamela Clabburn =

English author and conservationist (1914–2010)

Pamela Clabburn MBE
- Born: 13 April 1914; Norwich, Norfolk, England
- Died: 2 July 2010 (aged 97); Norwich, Norfolk, England
- Education: Norwich High School for Girls
- Occupations: Author; Conservationist; Curator; Needlewoman; Textile expert

Pamela Clabburn MBE (13 April 1914 – 2 July 2010) was an English author, conservationist, curator, needlewoman and textile expert. She worked for the staff of Strangers' Hall Museum in Norwich as assistant curator of social history and at Norwich Museum as their assistant history of social history. Clabburn retired from Strangers' Hall in 1974, and set up the National Trust's textile conservation department three years later, overseeing the conservation of various textiles in East Anglian homes throughout the following decade. She was the author of books about textiles and founded the Costume and Textile Association in 1990.

== Early life and pre-textile career ==
On 13 April 1914, Clabburn was born in Norwich, Norfolk. She was educated at the Norwich High School for Girls and was about to enroll at the Royal School of Needlework when the Second World War broke out. She consequently joined the Army as a nurse, serving throughout the duration of the war. During demobilisation, Clabburn worked a variety of jobs in the rag-trade of London for a brief period, such as being an East End factory hand-finisher before returning to Norfolk.

== Career ==
She used her interest in needlework to establish a dressmaker business in Norwich, and was invited to successfully join the staff of Strangers' Hall Museum in Norwich as assistant curator of social history in 1965, overseeing the successful repairs of a quartet of Gothic tapestries. The following year, Clabburn took three months to move the collection of Strangers' Hall that had been housed at Norwich's Castle Museum. She made additions to the collection while cataloguing it, asking the owners of middle-class occupational clothes if they had any plans for the textiles. Clabburn frequently appeared on the Anglia Television programme Bygones, and was the author of various magazine and newspaper articles on the collection of Strangers' Hall. In 1969, she was appointed Norwich Museum's assistant history of social history.

Clabburn retired from Strangers' Hall Museum in April 1974, giving her more freedom to lobby for the acknowledgement, importance and richness of Norwich's collections. In 1976, she published the encyclopedic book, The Needleworker's Dictionary, featuring approximately 2,000 entries on embroidery. By 1977, Clabburn was invited to set up the textile conversion department of the National Trust, which featured a workroom that was located at Blickling Hall in Norfolk. She oversaw the conservation of various textiles from East Anglian houses throughout the next decade. Clabburn wrote the 1981 book In Imitation of the Indian (Shire Album 77), discovering the Kashmir shawl's impact in Great Britain and the shawls built in Edinburgh, Norwich and Paisley.

She retired in 1989 and focused on establishing the Costume and Textile Association (C&TA) the year after. Her next book, National Trust Book of Furnishing Textiles, was published in 1989. Clabburn used the C&TA to locate a new place for Norfolk's costumes and textiles to be housed and to develop an organisation giving the Norfolk Museum Service support. In 1995, her ongoing work on Norfolk shawls culminated in the book The Norwich Shawl that accompanied the exhibition Style and Splendour, the Norwich Shawl Industry 1785–1885 mounted in Norwich's Castle Museum of which she was a consultant on.

== Personal life ==
Clabburn was appointed MBE in the 1999 New Year Honours "for services to Textile Conservation in Museums and Galleries". She chose to receive the award from the Lord Lieutenant of Norfolk rather than at Buckingham Palace. On 2 July 2010, she died at Hethersett Hall Care Home, Norwich following a prolonged illness. Clabburn did not marry. A funeral service was held for her at the St Peter Mancroft, Norwich on 19 July, followed by a burial at Besthorpe All Saints.

== Personality and legacy ==
Helen Hoyte said Clabburn "had a wry sense of humour" and "was a compulsive buyer of books". The Times and Sam Emanuel of Norwich Evening News wrote that Clabburn was " a world authority on textile conservation and an expert on the history of the Norwich shawl industry." A book that people were invited to contribute was to honour her, and her vast specialist costume and textile book collection was donated to the Norwich Museum Service.
