= Ennis High School =

Coordinates: 32.3023°N 96.6293°W

Ennis 6th grade center
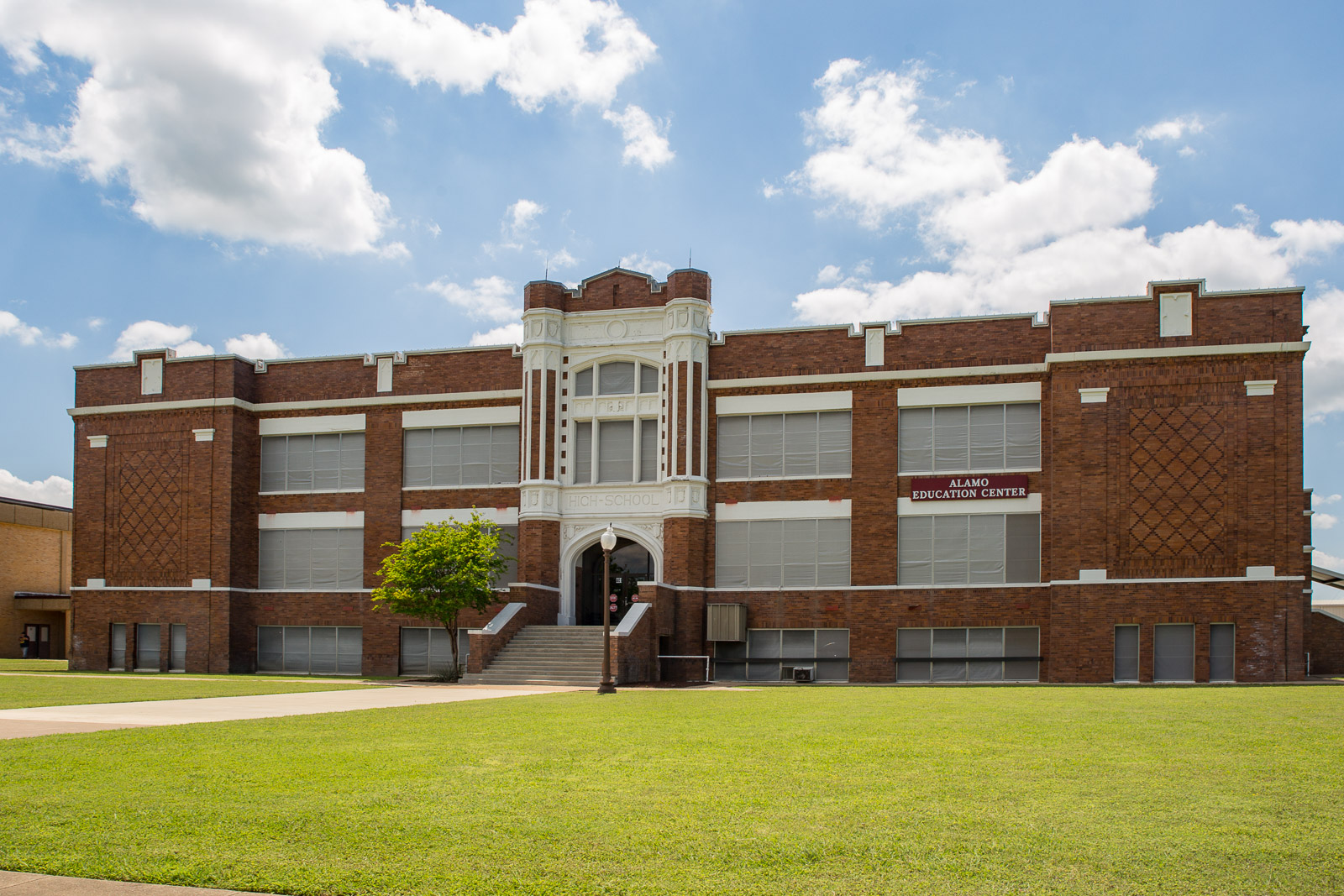

Location
- 2301 Ensign Rd; Ennis, Texas 75119; United States

Information
- School type: Public High School
- Motto: Believe
- School district: Ennis Independent School District
- Principal: Nathan Moye
- Staff: 120.49 (FTE)
- Grades: 9-12
- Enrollment: 1,848 (2023–2024)
- Student to teacher ratio: 15.34
- Colors: Maroon & White
- Athletics conference: UIL Class AAAAA
- Mascot: Lion (Samson) and Lady Lion (Delilah)
- Website: Ennis High School

Ennis High School is a public high school located in the city of Ennis, Texas, in Ellis County, United States and classified as a 5A school by the UIL. It is a part of the Ennis Independent School District located in southeast Ellis County. In 2015, the school was rated "Met Standard" by the Texas Education Agency.

== Athletics ==
The Ennis Lions compete in the following sports:

Volleyball, Cross Country, Football, Basketball, Powerlifting, Soccer, Golf, Tennis, Track, Baseball and Softball

=== State titles ===
- Football:
  - 1975(3A), 2000(4A/D2), 2001(4A/D2), 2004(4A/D1), 2014(5A/D2)
- Track: 1998 (4A)
