= Pancreatic acinar metaplasia =

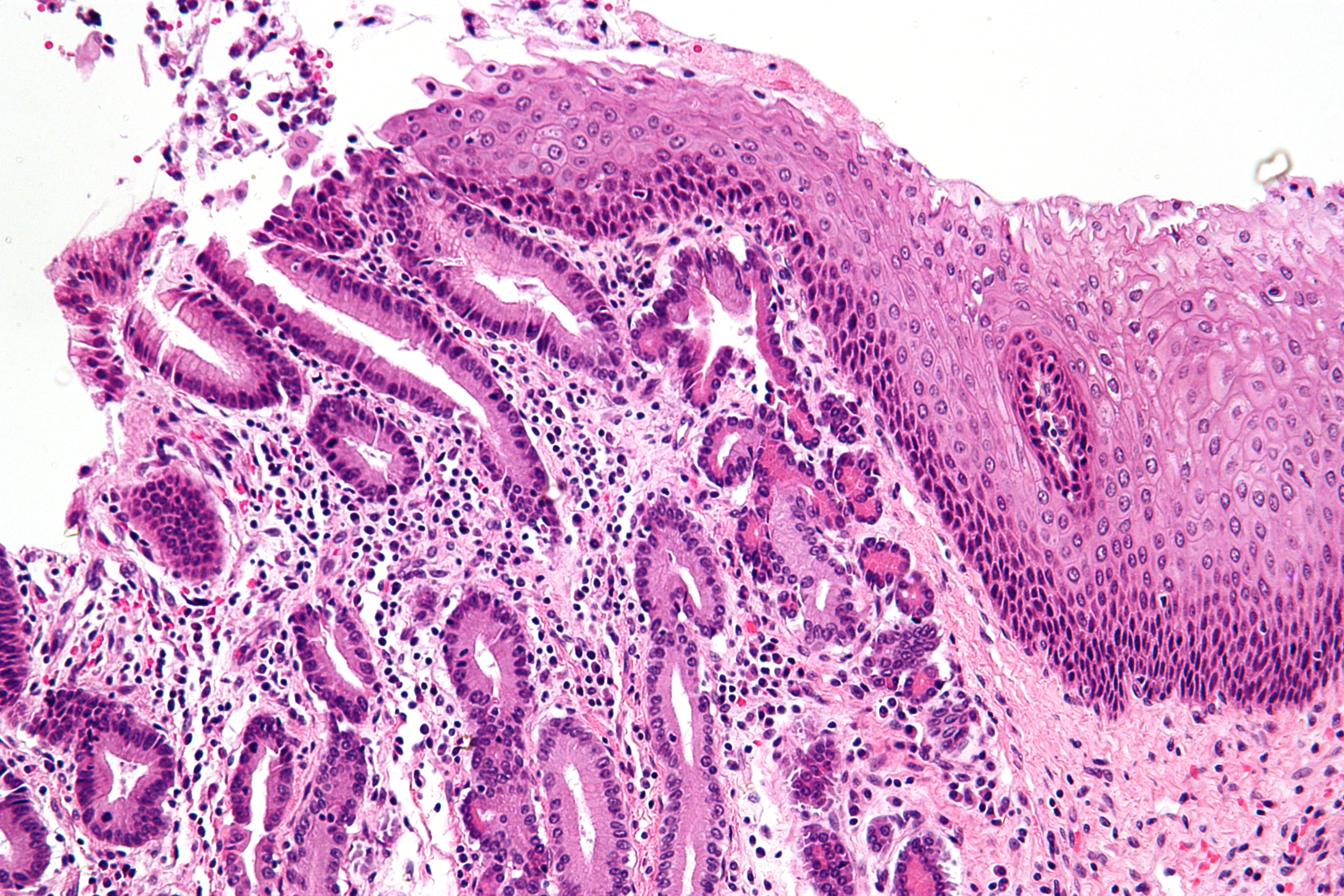
- Micrograph of a gastro-esophageal junction with pancreatic acinar metaplasia. The esophageal mucosa (stratified squamous epithelium) is seen on the right. The gastric mucosa (simple columnar epithelium) is seen on the left. The metaplastic epithelial is at the junction (center of image) and has an intensely eosinophilic (bright pink) cytoplasm. H&E stain.
- Specialty: Oncology

Pancreatic acinar metaplasia (PAM) is a common incidental histopathologic finding present in approximately 20-25% of patients undergoing an esophagogastroduodenoscopy.

== Signs and symptoms ==
Studies are mixed on whether it is associated with pathology and symptoms. There is some epidemiological evidence to suggest is associated with gastroesophageal reflux and Helicobacter gastritis.

There is no evidence to suggest it is pre-neoplastic, like Barrett's esophagus.

== Cause ==
A slight increased incidence with age suggests it is an acquired lesion, as may be seen in a true metaplasia.

== Histopathology ==
The histopathologic features of pancreatic acinar metaplasia are: (1) the presence of cell clusters that resembles a many-lobed "berry" (an acinus), with (2) cells that are histomorphologically identical to the glands of the exocrine pancreas.

== See also ==
- Metaplasia
