= Pamela Fitzgerald =

Pamela Fitzgerald may refer to:

- Pamela FitzGerald, Lady Edward FitzGerald (c. 1773–1831)
- Pamela Fitzgerald (camogie) (born 1984), Irish camogie player
