= Pamela Robertson Wojcik =

American film, television, and theatre professor

Pamela Robertson Wojcik is an American film scholar and academic, serving as the Andrew V. Tackes Professor of Film, Television, and Theatre and Chair of the Department of Film, Television, and Theatre at the University of Notre Dame.

She holds concurrent appointments in Gender Studies and American Studies. A former president of the Society for Cinema and Media Studies and recipient of a Guggenheim Fellowship, her work explores issues of modernity, urbanism, gender, mobility, and space in American cinema.

== Biography ==
Wojcik grew up in Braintree, Massachusetts, and earned a B.A. (magna cum laude, with honors) in English from Wellesley College in 1986, where she wrote a thesis on film noir. She proceeded to the University of Chicago, where she completed an M.A. (with honors) in English Language and Literature in 1988, receiving the J.A. Steiner Prize for best thesis for her essay on Preston Sturges. Her Ph.D. in English Language and Literature (1993) was also awarded by the University of Chicago; her dissertation was titled “Feminist Camp and the Female Spectator.”

She won the Society for Cinema Studies Dissertation Award.

Wojcik lives in Chicago with her husband, Rick Wojcik, who owns Dusty Groove, an online and bricks-and-mortar record store. She has two adult children.

== Career ==
Wojcik began her academic career at the University of Newcastle, Australia, where she served as a lecturer in the Department of English from 1994 to 1997.

In 1998, she joined the University of Notre Dame as an assistant professor in the Department of Film, Television, and Theatre.

She was promoted to associate professor in 2001 and to full professor in 2011, and she received an endowed professorship in 2022. She also holds concurrent professorships in American studies and gender studies, and has been affiliated with the Center for Italian Studies since 2024.

Wojcik has held several administrative and leadership positions at Notre Dame, including as a senior fellow and director of the Gender Studies program. In 2020, she was awarded the Sheedy Award for Excellence in Teaching in the College of Arts and Letters.

In 2020, she became chair of the Department of Film, Television, and Theatre, and in 2022 was appointed the Andrew V. Tackes Professor of Film, Television, and Theatre.

== Research and scholarly works ==
Wojcik is the author of monographs that explore intersections of gender, space, mobility, and spectatorship in American cinema.

Her first book, Guilty Pleasures: Feminist Camp from Mae West to Madonna (Duke University Press, 1996), redefined the concept of feminist camp by foregrounding female spectatorship and agency in popular culture.

She later shifted her attention to domestic and urban space in The Apartment Plot: Urban Living in American Film and Popular Culture, 1945–1975 (Duke University Press, 2010), which established the “apartment plot” as a distinct mode of narrative centered on postwar modernity and the redefinition of home.

Wojcik's monographs further extend her exploration of American film and cultural representation across multiple domains. Fantasies of Neglect: Imagining the Urban Child in American Film and Fiction (Rutgers University Press, 2016) analyzes how twentieth-century film and literature constructed the figure of the urban child often idealized, threatened, or abandoned to probe anxieties about modernity, mobility, and urban space.

Her most recent book, Unhomed: Cycles of Mobility and Placelessness in American Cinema (University of California Press, 2024), examines cinematic portrayals of displacement, homelessness, and unstable belonging across the twentieth and twenty-first centuries.

Alongside her monographs, Wojcik has edited a series of influential volumes include Soundtrack Available: Essays on Film and Popular Music (Duke University Press, 2001), co-edited with Arthur Knight; Movie Acting: The Film Reader (Routledge, 2004); New Constellations: Movie Stars of the 1960s (Rutgers University Press, 2011); The Apartment Complex: Urban Living and Global Screen Cultures (Duke University Press, 2018); and Media Crossroads: Intersections of Space and Identity in Screen Cultures (Duke University Press, 2021), co-edited with Paula Massood and Angel Matos. Most recently, she co-edited with Paula Massood The Routledge Companion to American Film History (Routledge, 2025).
