= James Pam =

Nigerian military officer (1933–1966)

James Yakubu Gyang Pam
- Born: Yakubu Gyang Pam; 23 November 1933; Jos, Colonial Nigeria
- Died: 15 January 1966 (aged 32); Lagos, Nigeria
- Burial place: Lagos
- Alma mater: Barewa College, Zaria; Royal Military Academy Sandhurst; Joint Services Staff College
- Military career
- Allegiance: British Empire (1957–1960); Nigeria (1960–1966)
- Branch: Royal West African Frontier Force; Nigerian Army
- Service years: 1957–1966
- Rank: Lieutenant-Colonel
- Conflicts

Lt. Col. James Yakubu Gyang Pam, MFR (23 November 1933 – 15 January 1966) was the Nigerian Army's Adjutant General who was assassinated during the 1966 Nigerian coup d'état. He was the first Nigerian artillery officer and the first military officer from the Middle Belt to be commissioned.

== Early life and education ==
Pam was born to Pam Sagok and Chundung Tsok of Du district, Jos in the old Plateau Province, now Plateau State. Pam received his foundational education at Central School in Pankshin and St. Paul's Primary School in Jos. He attended Barewa College, Zaria, where he earned an "exemption from the London Matriculation," an honor for outstanding students at the time. He went to Sudan Interior Mission School (SUM) and later enlisted into the Nigerian Regiment of the Royal West African Frontier Force (RWAFF).

== Military career ==
Pam attended the Regular Officers' Special School in Teshie, Ghana. Later, he trained at Cadet School Eaton Hall in England. He also attended the Royal Military Academy Sandhurst in England, where he completed his officers' training, receiving the Queen's Commission as a 2nd Lieutenant in 1955. Upon commissioning, he became the first Nigerian Artillery Officer and the first Military Officer from the Middle Belt to receive a commission and held various positions within the West African Frontier Force (WAFF), serving as aide-de-camp to the Governor-General of Northern Nigeria, Mr. Sharwood-Smith. He latter attended the Joint Services Staff College (JSSC) in Camberley, England. On return, he was appointed the first African to command the 3rd Battalion Nigerian Army in Kaduna, and eventually held position of Adjutant-General of the Nigerian Army until his assassination. He was engaged in various peacekeeping efforts in various regions including operations in the Southern Cameroons, the United Nations Peacekeeping Force in the Congo, and interventions during the Tiv riots and the suppression of mutiny in Tanganyika (now Tanzania) which earned him recognition from President Julius Nyerere, who honored him with a lion skin and shield.

== Death ==
Pam was killed in the early hours of 15 January 1966, during the events of the military coup. At about 2:10 am, Pam, along with his wife Elizabeth and their family, woke to the alarming sight of armed soldiers converging towards their residence at 8, Ikoyi Crescent, Ikoyi, Lagos. The soldiers led by Major Humphrey Chukwuka, a close confidant and his deputy came face-to-face with Pam. Chukwuka, informed Pam of their intent to take him away. Elizabeth pleaded with Chukwuka to spare her husband's life. Chukwuka reassured Elizabeth that they would not harm him, promising to bring Pam back safely. Aware of the danger, Pam shared a poignant moment with his daughter, Kaneng, and then turned to his wife, uttering his final words in Hausa, entrusting her with their children's care. He was later executed after being permitted to offer his final prayers.

== Family ==
Pam was married to Elizabeth Pam, who was born to a Ghanaian Christian father and a Fulani Muslim mother and together they had six children - two girls and four boys. They include, Justice Jummai H. Sankey, Justice of the Court of Appeal in Gombe; Mrs. Kaneng Daze, proprietress, NNPC Mega station in Jos; Yusufu J. Pam Esq., former Attorney-General of Plateau State; Dr. Ishaku C. Pam, Fellow of the Royal College of Physicians and Royal Society of Medicine as well as a Clinical Director in the British National Health Service at Noble's Hospital in the Isle of Man, U.K.; Ishaya C. Pam, Professor of Obstetrics & Gynaecology, and former Chief Medical Director of Jos University Teaching Hospital; Ibrahim K. Pam Esq., Green Climate fund, South Korea. His wife Elizabeth died on 10 May 2011.
