= Kirby Baxter Holmes =

Rev. Kirby Baxter Holmes was a Christian minister and singer in Texas who invited Martin Luther King, Jr. to speak in Texas.

He was born February 16, 1908, to Peter C. Holmes and Octavia Leapord-Holmes, in Ennis, Ellis County, Texas. He attended the public schools of Ennis and was professionally trained at Texas Barber College in Fort Worth, Texas. He was licensed as a Master Barber in 1927. Holmes was a lead vocalist, singing at the Wayside Church Of God in Christ, which aired nationwide on WBAP radio. Holmes was a singer in several gospel quartets, and traveled across the state appearing in religious concerts. Holmes was the founder and Pastor of the Upper Room Music Temple Church in Fort Worth. He received religious training as a student of the United Christian Leadership School under Dean Vada P. Felder. In the early 1940s, black-oriented radio station KNOK, which mainly aired rhythm and blues programs, decided to try a Gospel music program to expand its format. Holmes was selected to present the program, which became popular.

Martin Luther King Jr., then a highly controversial figure, came to Fort Worth, Texas on his only tour in the state, upon Holmes' invitation.

Holmes died on January 8, 1989. He is buried at Cedar Hill Memorial Park in Arlington, Texas.
