= Pamela Kunz =

American oncologist

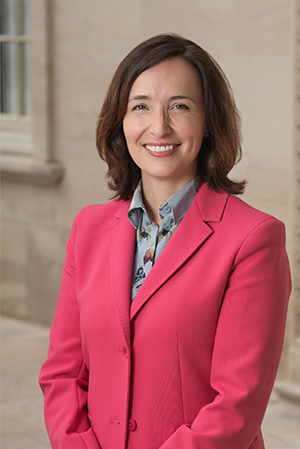
- Born: Massachusetts, USA
- Spouse: Jeffrey Kwan
- Relatives: Thomas Kunz (father)

Academic background
- Education: BA, 1994, Dartmouth College; MD, 2001, Geisel School of Medicine

Academic work
- Institutions: Yale Cancer Center; Stanford University School of Medicine

Pamela Lyn Kunz is an American oncologist. She is the leader of the Gastrointestinal Cancers Program at Yale Cancer Center and Smilow Cancer Hospital and director of GI Medical Oncology within the Section of Medical Oncology. She was formerly the director of the Stanford Neuroendocrine Tumor Program before leaving, in part due to harassment. Kunz was also recognized as one of the 100 Influential Women in Oncology by OncoDaily.

== Early life and education ==
Kunz was born to parents Thomas and Margaret Kunz and grew up with her brother David. Her father was a biologist specializing in the study of bats at Boston University. She attended Dartmouth College for her Bachelor of Arts degree in 1994 and Geisel School of Medicine for her medical degree in 2001. In 2000, she was the co-recipient of the "Best Oral Presentation by a Resident or Medical Student" Award and elected student body president.

== Career ==
Kunz joined Stanford University School of Medicine in 2001 as a resident in Internal Medicine, during which she said she felt "supported, mentored and valued." She remained at the institution for a fellowship in Oncology and joined the Division of Oncology faculty in 2010. During her tenure at Stanford, Kunz's research focused on treating patients with gastrointestinal malignancies and neuroendocrine tumors, leading to the design, development and execution of clinical trials in this field. As an assistant professor of medicine, Kunz was appointed the medical director of the Stanford's Neuroendocrine Tumor Program, a program aimed at providing clinical care to patients with neuroendocrine tumors. She also serves on the executive committee of the North American Neuroendocrine Tumor Society (NANETS) and chairs their finance committee and the Membership & Diversity Committee. During the 2019–20 academic year, Kunz was appointed a faculty research fellow at Stanford's Michelle R. Clayman Institute for Gender Research. Through this fellowship, she examined gender representation in her field including the disparities of women in clinical trials and leadership roles.

In early 2020, Kunz announced that she was leaving Stanford to accept a position as leader of the Gastrointestinal Cancers Program at Smilow Cancer Hospital at Yale Cancer Center and director of GI Medical Oncology within the Section of Medical Oncology. She told The Stanford Daily that she was leaving Stanford as a result of "microaggressions...that had caused significant barriers to her success." In July 2020, Kunz was appointed the leader of gastrointestinal cancers program at Yale Cancer Center and Smilow Cancer Hospital and an associate professor of medicine in the Division of Oncology. Shortly after her first year at Yale, Kunz was recognized as the ‘Woman Oncologist of the Year’ by Women Leaders in Oncology. In 2024, she was elected a fellow of the American Society of Clinical Oncology.

== Personal life ==
Kunz is married and has three sons. She identifies as a feminist.
