= PAM Health =

Health care company in the United States

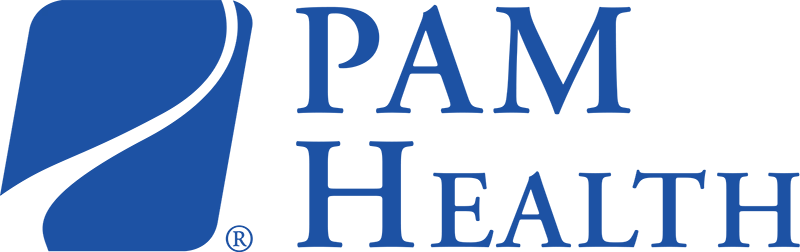

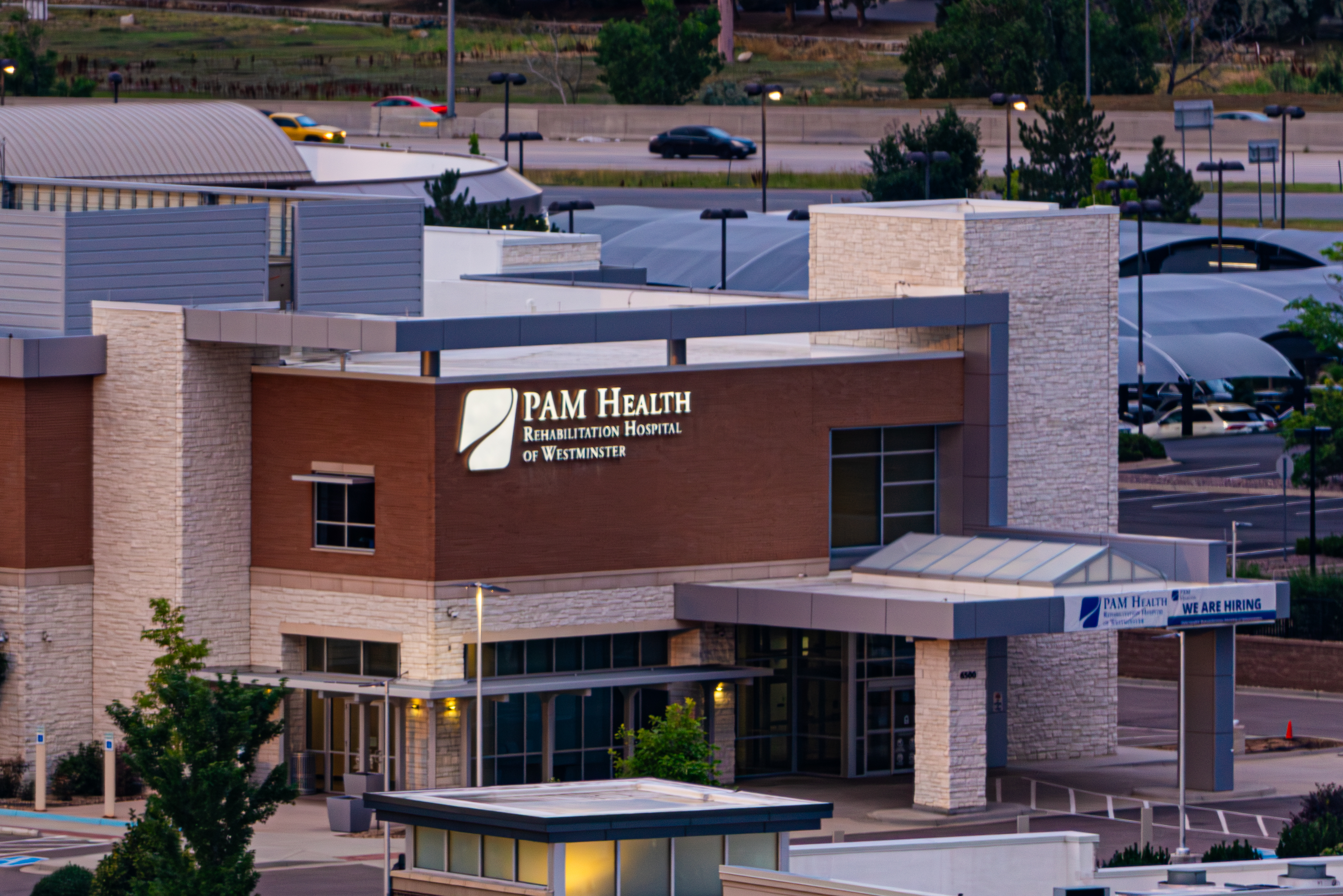
- PAM Health Rehabilitation Hospital of Westminster
- Formerly: Post Acute Medical
- Type: Limited liability company
- Industry: Health care
- Founded: 2006; 20 years ago
- Founder: Anthony Misitano (CEO and chairman)
- Headquarters: Enola, Pennsylvania, United States
- Number of locations: <100 (2025)
- Area served: United States (23 states)
- Services: Rehabilitation; Physical therapy Wound care Behavioral health
- Website: pamhealth.com

PAM Health, LLC is a healthcare provider that specializes in rehabilitation. It is headquartered in Enola, Pennsylvania near Harrisburg, and operates hospitals and clinics in at least 23 states across the United States.

== History ==
Post Acute Medical was founded in 2006 by Anthony Misitano; the company purchased three rehabilitation hospitals in San Antonio, Texas. In 2021, the company was renamed PAM Health.

== Collaborations ==
According to its website, PAM Health is partnered with Penn State Athletics and Hall of Fame Health. Founder and CEO Anthony Misitano is an alumnus of Penn State University and has served on the board of Happy Valley United, Penn State Athletics' name, image, and likeness collective. PAM Health and the Misitano family donated $25 million to Penn State's renovation of Beaver Stadium, the second-largest donation in Penn State Athletics' history and naming the west tower on the stadium PAM Health Misitano Family Tower. In February 2025, the Penn State Board of Trustees approved the leasing of land at Innovation Park near State College for construction of a PAM Health rehabilitation hospital.

== Facilities ==
Some PAM Health facilities are located within larger hospitals.

=== San Antonio ===
- a 65-bed rehabilitation hospital in the South Texas Medical Center
- a 34-bed rehabilitation hospital in Thousand Oaks
- a 40-bed acute-care facility in New Braunfels
- The former Promise Hospital was acquired in 2012 and became Warm Springs Specialty Hospital. It is a 26-bed long-term acute hospital located within Southwest General Hospital.

=== Delaware ===
- PAM Health's first Delaware hospital opened in Dover in 2019.
- A facility at the Bayhealth Hospital, Sussex in Milford opened in 2024.

=== Indiana ===
- Pam Health Rehabilitation Hospital of Greater Indiana North, formerly Southern Indiana Rehabilitation Hospital. Acquired in 2024

=== Pennsylvania ===
PAM Health has long-term acute care hospitals in Wilkes-Barre, Pittsburgh, and Beaver areas and opened a rehabilitation hospital in Enola in June 2026.

== Controversies ==
In 2018, Post Acute Medical agreed to pay more than $13 million to the US federal government, $114,016 to Texas, and $22,482 to Louisiana due to violations of the False Claims Act and the Physician Self-Referral Law.
