= Pam Bowers =

American basketball coach

Pamela Ann Bowers (born February 8, 1949) is an American basketball coach. She was the head coach for women's basketball at Baylor University from 1979 to 1994.

== Early life and education ==
Pam Bowers was born in Ennis, Texas. She graduated in 1970 from Dallas Baptist College.

== Coaching career ==
Bowers was the first women's basketball coach at McLennan Community College in Waco for four seasons beginning in 1975, achieving an 80–30 record and three North Texas Junior College Conference championships.

She was hired by Baylor in 1978 after McLennan beat them. In 1980–81 Baylor had a 29–11 record and went to the National Women's Invitational Tournament. Over fifteen years, Bowers's record was 168–257 with three winning seasons, and she was a member of the board of directors of the District 6 Women's Basketball Coaches Association.

In 1993–94 Bowers was fired, re-hired and fired again after the team went 15-16 for the season. Two weeks later she filed suit against the university alleging violations of the federal Title IX prohibition on sex discrimination and retaliation for her reporting violations of NCAA regulations by men's basketball coach Darrel Johnson. In August 1995 she and Baylor reached an out-of-court settlement.

Bowers worked at a junior high school in Waco after leaving Baylor. In 2004 she was hired as girls' basketball coach at Morton Ranch High School in Katy.
