= PAMS (disambiguation) =

PAMS is a U.S. jingle-production company.

Pams may also refer to:

- Jules Pams (1852–1930), French politician
- Pams (company), a New Zealand company in the food industry
- PAMs, Pneumatic artificial muscles
- Proceedings of the American Mathematical Society, a journal
