= Diggs =

Diggs is a surname. It may refer to:

== People ==
=== Sports ===
- Bubba Diggs (born c. 1960), American football player and coach
- Fadil Diggs (born 2001), American football player
- Jamar Diggs (born 1988), American basketball player
- Joetta Clark Diggs (born 1963), American middle-distance runner
- Kip Diggs (born 1966), American boxer
- Marissa Diggs (born 1992), American soccer player
- Na'il Diggs (born 1978), American football player
- Quandre Diggs (born 1993), American football player
- Quincy Diggs (born 1990), American basketball player
- Reese Diggs (1915–1978), American baseball player
- Stefon Diggs (born 1993), American football player
- Talitha Diggs (born 2002), American sprinter
- Trevon Diggs (born 1997), American football player

=== Government ===
- Charles Diggs (1922–1998), American politician
- Charles Diggs Sr. (1894–1967), American politician and father of Charles Diggs
- Danny Diggs, American politician
- Estella B. Diggs (1916–2013), American politician
- Francesca Diggs (fl. 2018–2020), American politician
- Marshall R. Diggs (1888–1968), American politician
- Roland Diggs (fl. 1990s), Liberian politician
- Thomas Diggs (died 1887), American politician

=== Music ===
- Daveed Diggs (born 1982), American rapper and actor
- Jamal Diggs (born 1970), stage name J-Diggs, American rapper
- Jimmy Diggs (1938–2023), half of the soul-music duo Knight Brothers
- Renée Diggs, former member of the band Starpoint
- Robert Diggs (born 1969), stage name RZA, American music producer and rapper

=== Other ===
- Anita Doreen Diggs (born 1966), American editor and novelist
- Annie Le Porte Diggs (1853–1916), Canadian journalist
- Ellen Diggs (1906–1998), American anthropologist
- George Diggs (born 1952), American biology professor
- J. Frank Diggs (1917–2004), American journalist
- Jimmy Diggs (born 1955), American screenwriter
- Lemuel Diggs (1900–1995), American pathologist
- Louis S. Diggs (born 1932), American writer and historian
- Richard Diggs (died 1727), British stage actor
- Sally Maria Diggs (c. 1851–?), American slave freed by Henry Ward Beecher
- Taye Diggs (born 1971), American actor and singer

== Fictional characters ==
- Oscar Diggs, better known as the Wizard of Oz (character)
- Diggs, the main character in the 2010 comedy film Cats & Dogs: The Revenge of Kitty Galore
- Diggs, in the 2005 horror film Boy Eats Girl

== See also ==
- Senator Diggs (disambiguation)
- Digges (surname)
