= List of Alpha Chi chapters =

Alpha Chi National College Honor Society is an American collegiate honor society recognizing achievements in general scholarship. In the following list of chapters, active chapters are indicated in bold and inactive chapters and institutions are in italics.

Chapter	Charter date and range	Institution	Location	Status	Ref.
**Texas Alpha**	1922	Southwestern University	Georgetown, Texas	Active	
**Texas Beta**	1922	University of Mary Hardin–Baylor	Belton, Texas	Active	
**Texas Gamma**	1922	Baylor University	Waco, Texas	Active	
Texas Delta	1922–1929	Texas Presbyterian College	Milford, Texas	Inactive	(Note: The college closed and merged with Austin College in 1929.)
Texas Epsilon	1922	Trinity University	San Antonio, Texas	Inactive	
**Texas Zeta**	1922	West Texas A&M University	Canyon, Texas	Active	
**Texas Eta**	1922	University of North Texas	Denton, Texas	Active	
Texas Theta	1922	Texas Woman's University	Denton, Texas	Inactive	
**Texas Iota**	1922	Texas State University	San Marcos, Texas	Active	
**Texas Kappa**	1922	Austin College	Sherman, Texas	Active	
Texas Lambda	1922	Texas A&M University–Commerce	Commerce, Texas	Inactive	
**Texas Mu**	1922	Texas Wesleyan University	Fort Worth, Texas	Active	
**Texas Nu**	1922	Our Lady of the Lake University	San Antonio, Texas	Active	
Texas Xi	1923	Texas Christian University	Fort Worth, Texas	Inactive	
Texas Omicron	1923	Sam Houston State University	Huntsville, Texas	Active	
Texas Pi	1925	Howard Payne University	Brownwood, Texas	Inactive	
**Texas Rho**	1925	Hardin–Simmons University	Abilene, Texas	Active	
Texas Sigma	1926	Stephen F. Austin State University	Nacogdoches, Texas	Inactive	
**Texas Tau**	1926	St. Edward's University	Austin, Texas	Active	
**Texas Upsilon**	1926	McMurry University	Abilene, Texas	Active	
**Texas Phi**	1926	University of the Incarnate Word	San Antonio, Texas	Active	
**Texas Chi**	1926	Sul Ross State University	Alpine, Texas	Active	
**Louisiana Alpha**	1926	Centenary College of Louisiana	Shreveport, Louisiana	Active	
Arkansas Alpha	1926	Hendrix College	Conway, Arkansas	Inactive	
**Texas Psi**	1927	Abilene Christian University	Abilene, Texas	Active	
**Texas Omega**	1927	Texas A&M University–Kingsville	Kingsville, Texas	Active	
Texas Alpha Alpha	1928–before 1963	Texas Tech University	Lubbock, Texas	Inactive	
**Arkansas Beta**	1928	Ouachita Baptist University	Arkadelphia, Arkansas	Active	
**Louisiana Beta**	1929	Louisiana Christian University	Pineville, Louisiana	Active	
**Arkansas Gamma**	1932	University of Central Arkansas	Conway, Arkansas	Active	
**Arkansas Delta**	1932	University of the Ozarks	Clarksville, Arkansas	Active	
**Texas Alpha Beta**	1937	University of Texas at El Paso	El Paso, Texas	Active	
**Oklahoma Alpha**	1937	Northeastern State University	Tahlequah, Oklahoma	Active	
**Massachusetts Alpha**	1947	American International College	Springfield, Massachusetts	Active	
**Nebraska Alpha**	1947	Hastings College	Hastings, Nebraska	Active	
**Oklahoma Beta**	1950	University of Central Oklahoma	Edmond, Oklahoma	Active	
**Texas Alpha Gamma**	1951	Midwestern State University	Wichita Falls, Texas	Active	
**Arkansas Epsilon**	1953	Henderson State University	Arkadelphia, Arkansas	Active	
**Arkansas Zeta**	1956	University of Arkansas at Monticello	Monticello, Arkansas	Active	
**Texas Alpha Delta**	1956	Texas Lutheran University	Seguin, Texas	Active	
**Arkansas Eta**	1957	Harding University	Searcy, Arkansas	Active	
**South Carolina Alpha**	1957	Lander University	Greenwood, South Carolina	Active	
**Utah Alpha**	1957	Westminster University	Salt Lake City, Utah	Active	
**Arkansas Theta**	1958	Southern Arkansas University	Magnolia, Arkansas	Active	
Texas Alpha Epsilon	1958	Pan American University	Edinburg, Texas	Inactive	
**Texas Alpha Zeta**	1958	East Texas Baptist University	Marshall, Texas	Active	
**Georgia Alpha**	1958	Valdosta State University	Valdosta, Georgia	Active	
**Texas Alpha Eta**	1958	Wayland Baptist University	Plainview, Texas	Active	
**Indiana Alpha**	1959	Anderson University	Anderson, Indiana	Active	
**Mississippi Alpha**	1959	Mississippi College	Clinton, Mississippi	Active	
**Iowa Alpha**	1960	Wartburg College	Waverly, Iowa	Active	
**Arkansas Iota**	1960	Lyon College	Batesville, Arkansas	Active	
Nebraska Beta	1960	Dana College	Blair, Nebraska	Inactive	
**Tennessee Alpha**	1960	Tusculum University	Tusculum, Tennessee	Active	
**North Carolina Alpha**	1962	Appalachian State University	Boone, North Carolina	Active	
**Tennessee Beta**	1962	Union University	Jackson, Tennessee	Active	
Maine Alpha	1963	Nasson College	Springvale, Maine	Inactive	
**Oklahoma Gamma**	1963	East Central University	Ada, Oklahoma	Active	
**Michigan Alpha**	1964	Adrian College	Adrian, Michigan	Active	
**Ohio Alpha**	1964	Franciscan University of Steubenville	Steubenville, Ohio	Active	
**Iowa Beta**	1965	William Penn University	Oskaloosa, Iowa	Active	
**Kansas Alpha**	1965	Sterling College	Sterling, Kansas	Active	
**Kentucky Alpha**	1965	Murray State University	Murray, Kentucky	Active	
**Indiana Beta**	1966	Huntington University	Huntington, Indiana	Active	
Iowa Gamma	1966	Westmar University	Le Mars, Iowa	Inactive	
**Oklahoma Delta**	1966	Langston University	Langston, Oklahoma	Active	
**Oklahoma Epsilon**	1966	Oklahoma Christian University	Oklahoma City, Oklahoma	Active	
**South Dakota Alpha**	1966	University of Sioux Falls	Sioux Falls, South Dakota	Active	
**Colorado Alpha**	1967	Colorado State University Pueblo	Pueblo, Colorado	Active	
Kentucky Beta	1967	Spalding University	Louisville, Kentucky		
**Missouri Alpha**	1967	William Woods University	Fulton, Missouri	Active	
North Carolina Beta	1967	East Carolina University	Greenville, North Carolina		
**Alabama Alpha**	1968	Talladega College	Talladega, Alabama	Active	
**Alabama Eta**	XXX	Alabama State University	Montgomery, Alabama	Active	
**Kentucky Eta**		Alice Lloyd College	Pippa Passes, Kentucky	Active	
		American InterContinental University Atlanta	Atlanta, Georgia	Inactive	
		American InterContinental University South Florida Campus	Weston, Florida	Inactive	
**South Carolina Eta**		Anderson University	Anderson, South Carolina	Active	
**Texas Alpha Iota**		Angelo State University	San Angelo, Texas	Active	
**Arkansas Kappa**		Arkansas Tech University	Russellville, Arkansas	Active	
		Art Institute of Washington	Arlington, Virginia	Inactive	
		Augsburg College	Minneapolis, Minnesota	Inactive	
		Aurora University	Aurora, Illinois	Inactive	
**Virginia Beta**		Averett University	Danville, Virginia	Active	
**California Gamma**		Azusa Pacific University	Azusa, California	Active	
**Oklahoma Lambda**		Bacone College	Muskogee, Oklahoma	Active	
**Florida Epsilon**		Barry University	Miami Shores, Florida	Active	
**North Carolina Gamma**		Barton College	Wilson, North Carolina	Active	
**Puerto Rico Beta**		Bayamón Central University	Bayamón, Puerto Rico	Active	
		Becker College	Worcester, Massachusetts	Inactive	
**Nebraska Gamma**		Bellevue University	Bellevue, Nebraska	Active	
**Tennessee Eta**		Belmont University	Nashville, Tennessee	Active	
**South Carolina Epsilon**		Benedict College	Columbia, South Carolina	Active	
**Florida Gamma**		Bethune–Cookman University	Daytona Beach, Florida	Active	
**Illinois Beta**		Blackburn College	Carlinville, Illinois	Active	
**New Jersey Beta**		Bloomfield College	Bloomfield, New Jersey	Active	
**Mississippi Eta**		Blue Mountain Christian University	Blue Mountain, Mississippi	Active	
**Virginia Kappa**		Bluefield University	Bluefield, Virginia	Active	
**West Virginia Delta**		Bluefield State University	Bluefield, West Virginia	Active	
**Maryland Alpha**		Bowie State University	Bowie, Maryland	Active	
**Kentucky Delta**		Brescia University	Owensboro, Kentucky	Active	
**North Carolina Omega**		Brevard College	Brevard, North Carolina	Active	
**Virginia Gamma**		Bridgewater College	Bridgewater, Virginia	Active	
**Iowa Epsilon**		Buena Vista University	Storm Lake, Iowa	Active	
**New Jersey Alpha**		Caldwell University	Caldwell, New Jersey	Active	
**California Beta**		California Baptist University	Riverside, California	Active	
**California Iota**		California State University, Bakersfield	Bakersfield, California	Active	
**Kentucky Lambda**		Campbellsville University	Campbellsville, Kentucky	Active	
**Ohio Epsilon**		Capital University	Bexley, Ohio	Active	
**Maryland Beta**		Capitol Technology University	South Laurel, Maryland	Active	
**Tennessee Delta**		Carson–Newman University	Jefferson City, Tennessee	Active	
**Wisconsin Delta**		Carthage College	Kenosha, Wisconsin	Active	
		Cascade College	Portland, Oregon	Inactive	
**Vermont Gamma**		Castleton University	Castleton, Vermont	Active	
**North Carolina Omicron**		Catawba College	Salisbury, North Carolina	Active	
		Cazenovia College	Cazenovia, New York	Inactive	
		Centenary College	Hackettstown, New Jersey	Inactive	
**Arkansas Xi**		Central Baptist College	Conway, Arkansas	Active	
**Missouri Nu**		Central Methodist University	Fayette, Missouri	Active	
**South Carolina Zeta**		Charleston Southern University	North Charleston, South Carolina	Active	
**North Carolina Phi**		Chowan University	Murfreesboro, North Carolina	Active	
**Tennessee Theta**		Christian Brothers University	Memphis, Tennessee	Active	
**Virginia Zeta**		Christopher Newport University	Newport News, Virginia	Active	
		Clearwater Christian College	Clearwater, Florida	Inactive	
**New Hampshire Alpha**		Colby–Sawyer College	New London, New Hampshire	Active	
		College of Mount Saint Joseph	Delhi Township, Ohio	Inactive	
**Colorado Gamma**		Colorado Mesa University	Grand Junction, Colorado	Active	
**Missouri Epsilon**		Columbia College	Columbia, Missouri	Active	
**West Virginia Beta**		Concord University	Athens, West Virginia	Active	
**Texas Alpha Rho**		Concordia University Texas	Austin, Texas	Active	
**Wisconsin Gamma**		Concordia University Wisconsin	Mequon, Wisconsin	Active	
		Cornerstone University	Grand Rapids, Michigan	Inactive	
**Missouri Tau**		Cottey College	Nevada, Missouri	Active	
**Missouri Beta**		Culver–Stockton College	Canton, Missouri	Active	
**Tennessee Lambda**		Cumberland University	Lebanon, Tennessee	Active	
**Texas Alpha Nu**		Dallas Baptist University	Dallas, Texas	Active	
		Daniel Webster College	Nashua, New Hampshire	Inactive	
**West Virginia Alpha**		Davis & Elkins College	Elkins, West Virginia	Active	
		Defiance College	Defiance, Ohio	Inactive	
**Delaware Alpha**		Delaware State University	Dover, Delaware	Active	
**Illinois Iota**		DeVry University Central Group	Naperville, Illinois	Active	
		DeVry University, Chicago	Chicago, Illinois	Inactive	
		DeVry University, Irving	Irving, Texas	Inactive	
		DeVry University, Phoenix	Phoenix, Arizona	Inactive	
**Louisiana Gamma**		Dillard University	New Orleans, Louisiana	Active	
**Illinois Kappa**		Dominican University	River Forest, Illinois	Active	
**New York Zeta**		Dominican University New York	Orangeburg, New York	Active	
**California Lambda**		Dominican University of California	San Rafael, California	Active	
		Dowling College	Oakdale, New York	Inactive	
		Edinboro University of Pennsylvania	Edinboro, Pennsylvania	Inactive	
**Florida Kappa**		Edward Waters University	Jacksonville, Florida	Active	
**North Carolina Iota**		Elizabeth City State University	Elizabeth City, North Carolina	Active	
**Georgia Iota**		Emmanuel University	Franklin Springs, Georgia	Active	
**South Carolina Iota**		Erskine College	Due West, South Carolina	Active	
**Illinois Alpha**		Eureka College	Eureka, Illinois	Active	
**Missouri Rho**		Evangel University	Springfield, Missouri	Active	
**Alabama Delta**		Faulkner University	Montgomery, Alabama	Active	
**Virginia Theta**		Ferrum College	Ferrum, Virginia	Active	
**Florida Beta**		Flagler College	St. Augustine, Florida	Active	
**Florida Xi**		Florida College	Temple Terrace, Florida	Active	
**Florida Zeta**		Florida Memorial University	Miami Gardens, Florida	Active	
**New Hampshire Zeta**		Franklin Pierce University	Rindge, New Hampshire	Active	
**Tennessee Iota**		Freed–Hardeman University	Henderson, Tennessee	Active	
**California Zeta**		Fresno Pacific University	Fresno, California	Active	
**Kansas Epsilon**		Friends University	Wichita, Kansas	Active	
**North Carolina Zeta**		Gardner–Webb University	Boiling Springs, North Carolina	Active	
**Pennsylvania Lambda**		Geneva College	Beaver Falls, Pennsylvania	Active	
**Oregon Delta**		George Fox University	Newberg, Oregon	Active	
**Georgia Zeta**		Georgia Southwestern State University	Americus, Georgia	Active	
**Delaware Beta**		Goldey–Beacom College	Wilmington, Delaware	Active	
**Indiana Gamma**		Grace College & Seminary	Winona Lake, Indiana	Active	
**Iowa Eta**		Graceland University	Lamoni, Iowa	Active	
**Arizona Alpha**		Grand Canyon University	Phoenix, Arizona	Active	
**Iowa Theta**		Grand View University	Des Moines, Iowa	Active	
		Green Mountain College	Poultney, Vermont	Inactive	
**North Carolina Xi**		Greensboro College	Greensboro, North Carolina	Active	
**Missouri Kappa**		Hannibal–LaGrange University	Hannibal, Missouri	Active	
**Missouri Zeta**		Harris–Stowe State University	St. Louis, Missouri	Active	
**Hawaii Beta**		Hawaii Pacific University	Honolulu, Hawaii	Active	
		Hesser College	Manchester, New Hampshire	Inactive	(Note: Hesser College became Mount Washington College in 2013. It closed in May 2016.)
**North Carolina Nu**		High Point University	High Point, North Carolina	Active	
**Texas Alpha Lambda**		Houston Christian University	Houston, Texas	Active	
**Indiana Lambda**		Indiana Institute of Technology	Fort Wayne, Indiana	Active	
		Indiana University Kokomo	Kokomo, Indiana	Inactive	
**Indiana Zeta**		Indiana University Southeast	New Albany, Indiana	Active	
**Indiana Nu**		Indiana Wesleyan University	Marion, Indiana	Active	
**New Mexico Gamma**		Institute of American Indian Arts	Santa Fe, New Mexico	Active	
**Mississippi Gamma**		Jackson State University	Jackson, Mississippi	Active	
		Jamestown College	Jamestown, North Dakota	Inactive	
**North Carolina Lambda**		Johnson C. Smith University	Charlotte, North Carolina	Active	
**Tennessee Omicron**		Johnson University	Kimberlin Heights, Tennessee	Active	
**Kansas Delta**		Kansas Wesleyan University	Salina, Kansas	Active	
		Kendall College	Evanston, Illinois	Inactive	
**Georgia Nu**		Kennesaw State University	Cobb County, Georgia	Active	
**Kentucky Gamma**		Kentucky Wesleyan College	Owensboro, Kentucky	Active	
**Michigan Gamma**		Lake Superior State University	Sault Ste. Marie, Michigan	Active	
**Tennessee Zeta**		Lee University	Cleveland, Tennessee	Active	
**North Carolina Chi**		Lees–McRae College	Banner Elk, North Carolina	Active	
**South Carolina Gamma**		Limestone University	Gaffney, South Carolina	Active	
**Tennessee Epsilon**		Lincoln Memorial University	Harrogate, Tennessee	Active	
**Missouri Pi**		Lindenwood University	St. Charles, Missouri	Active	
**Kentucky Theta**		Lindsey Wilson University	Columbia, Kentucky	Active	
**Tennessee Kappa**		Lipscomb University	Brentwood, Tennessee	Active	
**New York Sigma**		LIU Brooklyn	Brooklyn, New York	Active	
**Texas Alpha Mu**		Lubbock Christian University	Lubbock, Texas	Active	
		Lyndon State College	Lyndon, Vermont	Inactive	(Note: In 2018, the college merged with Johnson State College to create Northern Vermont University.)
**New York Theta**		Marist University	Poughkeepsie, New York	Active	
**North Carolina Epsilon**		Mars Hill University	Mars Hill, North Carolina	Active	
**New York Iota**		Marymount Manhattan College	Manhattan, New York	Active	
**Massachusetts Beta**		Massachusetts College of Liberal Arts	North Adams, Massachusetts	Active	
**New York Gamma**		Medaille College	Buffalo, New York	Active	
**California Delta**		Menlo College	Atherton, California	Active	
**New York Epsilon**		Mercy University	Dobbs Ferry, New York	Active	
**North Carolina Mu**		Methodist University	Fayetteville, North Carolina	Active	
**Kansas Zeta**		MidAmerica Nazarene University	Olathe, Kansas	Active	
**Tennessee Nu**		Milligan University	Milligan College, Tennessee	Active	
		Misericordia University	Dallas, Pennsylvania	Inactive	
**Mississippi Zeta**		Mississippi State University, Meridian	Meridian, Mississippi	Active	
**Mississippi Delta**		Mississippi Valley State University	Itta Bena, Mississippi	Active	
**Missouri Omicron**		Missouri Baptist University	St. Louis, Missouri	Active	
		Missouri Southern State University	Joplin, Missouri	Inactive	
**Missouri Sigma**		Missouri Valley College	Marshall, Missouri	Active	
**Missouri Lambda**		Missouri Western State University	St. Joseph, Missouri	Active	
**Connecticut Epsilon**		Mitchell College	New London, Connecticut	Active	
		Montana State University Billings	Billings, Montana	Inactive	
**North Carolina Tau**		Montreat College	Montreat, North Carolina	Active	
		Mount Ida College	Newton, Massachusetts	Inactive	(Note: The University of Massachusetts Amherst acquired the college in 2018.)
**New York Kappa**		Mount Saint Mary College	Newburgh, New York	Active	
**Ohio Gamma**		Mount St. Joseph University	Delhi Township, Ohio	Active	
**Ohio Delta**		Mount Vernon Nazarene University	Mount Vernon, Ohio	Active	
**New Hampshire Eta**		New England College	Henniker, New Hampshire	Active	
**Rhode Island Gamma**		New England Institute of Technology	East Greenwich, Rhode Island	Active	
**New Mexico Alpha**		New Mexico State University	Las Cruces, New Mexico	Active	
		Newbury College	Brookline, Massachusetts	Inactive	
**North Carolina Theta**		North Carolina A&T State University	Greensboro, North Carolina	Active	
		North Central University	Minneapolis, Minnesota	Inactive	
**Illinois Zeta**		Northeastern Illinois University	Chicago, Illinois	Active	
**Kentucky Zeta**		Northern Kentucky University	Highland Heights, Kentucky	Active	
**Vermont Epsilon**		Northern Vermont University-Lyndon	Lyndon, Vermont	Active	
**Wisconsin Beta**		Northland College	Ashland, Wisconsin	Inactive	
**Missouri Mu**		Northwest Missouri State University	Maryville, Missouri	Active	
**Vermont Beta**		Norwich University	Northfield, Vermont	Active	
**Florida Eta**		Nova Southeastern University	Fort Lauderdale, Florida	Active	
		Nyack College	Nyack, New York	Inactive	
**Alabama Zeta**		Oakwood University	Huntsville, Alabama	Active	
**Georgia Gamma**		Oglethorpe University	Brookhaven, Georgia	Active	
		Ohio Valley College	Vienna, West Virginia	Inactive	
**Oklahoma Eta**		Oklahoma City University	Oklahoma City, Oklahoma	Active	
**Oklahoma Zeta**		Oklahoma Panhandle State University	Goodwell, Oklahoma	Active	
**Oklahoma Kappa**		Oklahoma Wesleyan University	Bartlesville, Oklahoma	Active	
**Oregon Beta**		Oregon Institute of Technology	Klamath Falls, Oregon	Active	
**New York Lambda**		Pace University, New York Campus	New York City, New York	Active	
		Pace University, Pleasantville-Briarcliff Campus	Briarcliff, New York	Inactive	(Note: The college sold the Briarcliff campus in 2015.)
**New York Mu**		Pace University Westchester	Pleasantville, New York	Active	
**Missouri Theta**		Park University	Kansas City, Missouri	Active	
**Missouri Xi**		Parks College of Engineering, Aviation and Technology	St Louis, Missouri	Active	
		Paul Quinn College	Dallas, Texas	Inactive	
**Pennsylvania Xi**		Pennsylvania College of Technology	Williamsport, Pennsylvania	Active	
**California Alpha**		Pepperdine University	Culver City, California	Active	
**Nebraska Delta**		Peru State College	Peru, Nebraska	Active	
**Georgia Epsilon**		Piedmont College	Demorest, Georgia	Active	
		Pine Manor College	Quincy, Massachusetts	Inactive	
**Pennsylvania Eta**		Point Park University	Pittsburgh, Pennsylvania	Active	
**Puerto Rico Alpha**		Pontifical Catholic University of Puerto Rico	Ponce, Puerto Rico	Active	
**Connecticut Gamma**		Post University	Waterbury, Connecticut	Active	
**Indiana Theta**		Purdue University Northwest	Hammond, Indiana	Active	
**Georgia Mu**		Reinhardt University	Waleska, Georgia	Active	
**Virginia Delta**		Roanoke College	Salem, Virginia	Active	
**Pennsylvania Epsilon**		Robert Morris University	Moon Township, Pennsylvania	Active	
**Michigan Eta**		Rochester Christian University	Rochester Hills, Michigan	Active	
**Montana Beta**		Rocky Mountain College	Billings, Montana	Active	
**Rhode Island Alpha**		Roger Williams University	Bristol, Rhode Island	Active	
**Oklahoma Iota**		Rogers State University	Claremore, Oklahoma	Active	
**Michigan Delta**		Saginaw Valley State University	University Center, Michigan	Active	
**Iowa Delta**		St. Ambrose University	Davenport, Iowa	Active	
**North Carolina Sigma**		St. Andrews University	Laurinburg, North Carolina	Active	
**North Carolina Rho**		St. Augustine's University	Raleigh, North Carolina	Active	
**New York Beta**		St. Thomas Aquinas College	Sparkill, New York	Active	
**Pennsylvania Nu**		Saint Vincent College	Latrobe, Pennsylvania	Active	
**Texas Alpha Sigma**		Schreiner University	Kerrville, Texas	Active	
**North Carolina Eta**		Shaw University	Raleigh, North Carolina	Active	
**Virginia Iota**		Shenandoah University	Winchester, Virginia	Active	
**Georgia Theta**		Shorter University	Rome, Georgia	Active	
**California Mu**		Simpson University	Redding, California	Active	
**Oklahoma Theta**		Southeastern Oklahoma State University	Durant, Oklahoma	Active	
**Florida Lambda**		Southeastern University	Lakeland, Florida	Active	
**Texas Alpha Omega**		Southern Methodist University	Dallas, Texas	Active	
**New Hampshire Epsilon**		Southern New Hampshire University	Manchester, New Hampshire	Active	
		Southern Polytechnic State University	Marietta, Georgia	Inactive	
**Louisiana Zeta**		Southern University at New Orleans	New Orleans, Louisiana	Active	
		Southern Utah University	Cedar City, Utah	Inactive	
		Southern Vermont College	Bennington, Vermont	Inactive	(Note: The college closed in 2019.)
**South Carolina Delta**		Southern Wesleyan University	Central, South Carolina	Active	
**Missouri Gamma**		Southwest Baptist University	Bolivar, Missouri	Active	
**New York Omicron**		State University of New York College at Brockport	Brockport, New York	Active	
**Maryland Epsilon**		Stevenson University	Stevenson, Maryland	Active	
**D.C. Gamma**		Strayer University	Washington, D.C.	Active	
**Texas Alpha Kappa**		Tarleton State University	Stephenville, Texas	Active	
**Tennessee Gamma**		Tennessee Wesleyan College	Athens, Tennessee	Active	
		Texas A&M University–Corpus Christi	Corpus Christi, Texas	Inactive	
**Texas Beta Alpha**		Texas A&M University–Texarkana	Texarkana, Texas	Active	
**Pennsylvania Theta**		Thiel College	Greenville, Pennsylvania	Active	
**Maine Delta**		Thomas College	Waterville, Maine	Active	
**Georgia Lambda**		Thomas University	Thomasville, Georgia	Active	
**Mississippi Epsilon**		Tougaloo College	Tougaloo, Mississippi	Active	
**New York Nu**		Touro College	Bay Shore, New York	Active	
**Indiana Epsilon**		Trine University	Angola, Indiana	Active	
**Arkansas Mu**		University of Arkansas at Pine Bluff	Pine Bluff, Arkansas	Active	
**Maryland Gamma**		University of Baltimore	Baltimore, Maryland	Active	
**Iowa Zeta**		University of Dubuque	Dubuque, Iowa	Active	
**Connecticut Beta**		University of Hartford	West Hartford, Connecticut	Active	
**Texas Alpha Tau**		University of Houston–Clear Lake	Houston, Texas	Active	
**Indiana Eta**		University of Indianapolis	Indianapolis, Indiana	Active	
**North Dakota Alpha**		University of Jamestown	Jamestown, North Dakota	Active	
**California Theta**		University of La Verne	La Verne, California	Active	
**Maine Zeta**		University of Maine at Fort Kent	Fort Kent, Maine	Active	
**Alabama Gamma**		University of Mobile	Mobile, Alabama	Active	
**Montana Gamma**		University of Montana Western	Dillon, Montana	Active	
**North Carolina Upsilon**		University of Mount Olive	Mount Olive, North Carolina	Active	
**Maine Epsilon**		University of New England	Biddeford, Maine	Active	
**North Carolina Kappa**		University of North Carolina at Pembroke	Pembroke, North Carolina	Active	
**Alabama Beta**		University of South Alabama	Mobile, Alabama	Active	
**Florida Iota**		University of South Florida Sarasota–Manatee	Sarasota, Florida	Active	
		University of Southern Indiana	Evansville, Indiana	Inactive	
**Texas Alpha Theta**		University of Texas at Arlington	Arlington, Texas	Active	
		University of Texas at Brownsville	Brownsville, Texas	Active	(Note: In 2015, UT-Brownsville merged with UT-Pan American, forming the University of Texas Rio Grande Valley.)
**Texas Alpha Pi**		University of Texas at San Antonio	San Antonio, Texas	Active	
**Texas Alpha Xi**		University of Texas at Tyler	Tyler, Texas	Active	
**Texas Alpha Omicron**		University of Texas Rio Grande Valley	Brownsville, Texas	Active	
Pennsylvania Kappa		University of the Sciences	Philadelphia, Pennsylvania	Inactive	(Note: The university merged into Saint Joseph's University in June 2022.)
**New Mexico Beta**		University of the Southwest	Hobbs, New Mexico	Active	
**Alabama Epsilon**		University of West Alabama	Livingston, Alabama	Active	
**Iowa Kappa**		Upper Iowa University	Fayette, Iowa	Active	
		Urbana University	Urbana, Ohio	Inactive	(Note: The university was purchased by Franklin University in 2022.)
		Virginia Intermont College	Bristol, Virginia	Inactive	
		Voorhees College	Denmark, South Carolina	Inactive	
**Iowa Iota**		Waldorf University	Forest City, Iowa	Active	
**Oregon Alpha**		Warner Pacific University	Portland, Oregon	Active	
**Florida Delta**		Warner University	Lake Wales, Florida	Active	
**Maryland Delta**		Washington Adventist University	Takoma Park, Maryland	Active	
		Wesley College	Dover, Delaware	Inactive	(Note: College was acquired by Delaware State University in 2021 and is now the DSU Downtown campus.)
**West Virginia Epsilon**		West Liberty University	West Liberty, West Virginia	Active	
		West Virginia Institute of Technology Montgomery Campus	Montgomery, West Virginia	Inactive	
**Massachusetts Gamma**		Westfield State University	Westfield, Massachusetts	Active	
**Missouri Delta**		Westminster College	Fulton, Missouri	Active	
**Pennsylvania Alpha**		Widener University	Chester, Pennsylvania	Active	
		Wilkes University	Wilkes-Barre, Pennsylvania	Inactive	
**Mississippi Beta**		William Carey University	Hattiesburg, Mississippi	Active	
**North Carolina Psi**		William Peace University	Raleigh, North Carolina	Active	
**Arkansas Nu**		Williams Baptist University	Walnut Ridge, Arkansas	Active	
**North Carolina Pi**		Wingate University	Wingate, North Carolina	Active	
**California Kappa**		Woodbury University	Burbank, California	Active	
**Nebraska Epsilon**		York College	York, Nebraska	Active	
**Pennsylvania Delta**		York College of Pennsylvania	York, Pennsylvania	Active	
**Georgia Xi**		Young Harris College	Young Harris, Georgia	Active	
