= List of people from Sherman, Texas =

The following list includes notable people who were born or have lived in Sherman, Texas.

== Academics ==
- Light Townsend Cummins, educator and historian
- John C. Hitt, President of the University of Central Florida in Orlando, Florida
- Jerry B. Lincecum, Emeritus Professor of English at Austin College in Sherman, Texas

== Media ==
- Will Cain, Fox News personality
- Michael Quinn Sullivan, journalist and conservative political activist, based in Austin, Texas

== Acting ==
- Lucas Adams, actor
- Stella Adams (1883–1961), actress of the silent and early sound film eras
- Bess Flowers, actress
- Candace Kita, actress and model
- Tom Virtue, actor

== Music ==
- Donivan Blair, musician (Toadies)
- Zach Blair, musician (Hagfish; Rise Against)
- Teddy Buckner, musician
- Sam Coomes, musician
- Arizona Dranes, pioneering gospel singer and pianist
- Jimmy Hotz, record producer, recording engineer, electronic music pioneer, inventor, audio expert, author and musician
- Kublai Khan, metalcore band
- Buck Owens, country and western singer
- Katherine Neal Simmons, singer
- Buddy Tate, jazz saxophone and clarinet player (Count Basie, Benny Goodman, Lionel Hampton)

== Military ==
- John A. Hilger, United States Air Force brigadier general and participant of the Doolittle Raid during World War II

== Politics ==
- Joseph W. Bailey, former U.S. senator and attorney in Dallas, died in a courtroom in Sherman in 1929
- William Jefferson Blythe, Jr., father of former U.S. President Bill Clinton
- Ronald H. Clark, former Republican member of the Texas House of Representatives from District 62 in Sherman; judge of the United States District Court for the Eastern District of Texas, based in Beaumont
- Donnie Copeland, Pentecostal pastor, formerly at Greater Life Church in Sherman; Republican member of the Arkansas House of Representatives from North Little Rock, Arkansas
- Rick Hardcastle, rancher and businessman; Republican former member of the Texas House of Representatives from Wilbarger County; born in Sherman in 1956
- Larry Phillips, Sherman judge and former Republican member of the Texas House of Representatives

== Government ==
- Edna Gladney, early campaigner for children's rights and better living conditions for disadvantaged children
- Charles B. Winstead, FBI agent who killed John Dillinger

== Attorney ==
- William J. Durham, attorney and leader in the civil rights movement

== Sports ==
- A.J. Abrams, former professional and Texas Longhorns men's basketball player
- Kyle Crick, professional baseball player, Pittsburgh Pirates
- Chris Gittens, MLB Player, New York Yankee’s
- Lee Grissom, MLB All-Star pitcher
- Vernon Holland, NFL player, Cincinnati Bengals
- Tex Rickard, boxing promoter, first owner of NHL's New York Rangers, builder of Madison Square Garden, grew up in Sherman
- Chris Rockins, NFL player, Cleveland Browns
- Hunter Smith, NFL player, Indianapolis Colts Super Bowl XLI champion Pro Bowler
- Pete Spratt, MMA Fighter
- Jimmy Turner, NFL player
- Joe Watson, NFL player
- Ray Wehba, NFL player

== Historical ==
- Frank James, outlaw, Confederate guerrilla and brother of Jesse James
- Olive Oatman, Yavapai Indian captive and lecturer

== Business ==
- Kay Kimbell, entrepreneur, philanthropist, benefactor of the Kimbell Art Museum
