= Baker Field (Sherman, Texas) =

Ballpark in Sherman, Texas, U.S.

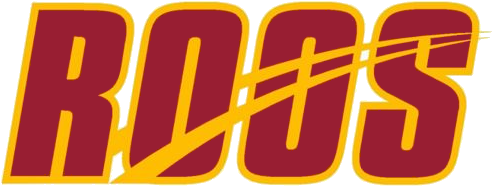

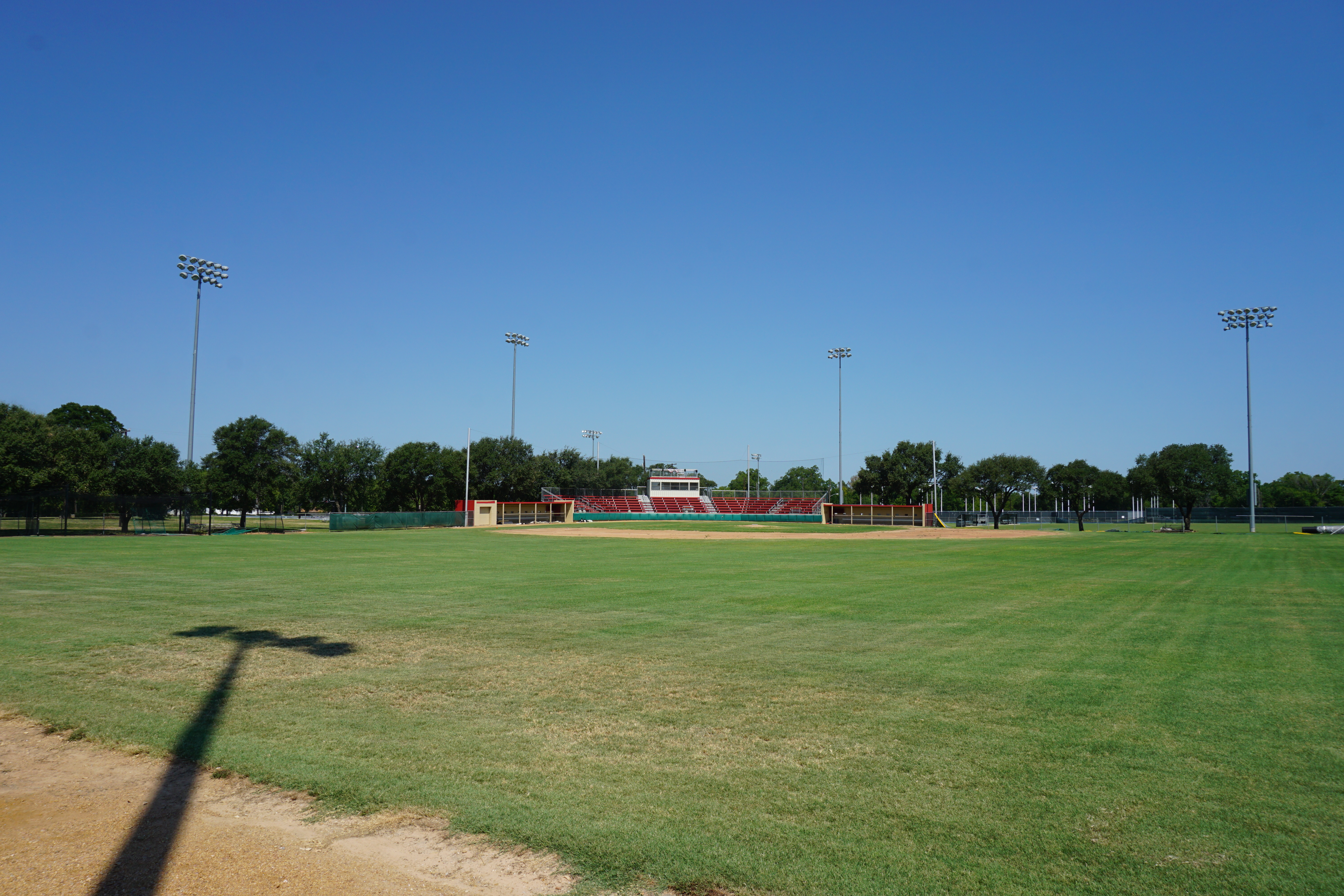
- The stadium in 2016
- Interactive map of Baker Field
- Address: Sherman, TX; United States
- Coordinates: 33.647073°N 96.600155°W
- Owner: Austin College
- Operator: Austin College Athletics
- Capacity: 400 (seated)
- Type: Ballpark
- Current use: Baseball

Construction
- Renovated: 2007

Tenant
- Austin Kangeroos baseball

Baker Field is a ballpark located on the campus of Austin College in Sherman, Texas. It is home to the Austin Kangaroos baseball team, which competes in the Southern Collegiate Athletic Conference.

The venue holds a capacity of 400.
