= Nettie Lee Benson =

American librarian and historian

- Born: January 15, 1905; Arcadia, Galveston County, Texas, U.S.
- Died: June 24, 1993 (aged 88); Austin, Texas, U.S.
- Awards: Order of the Aztec Eagle (1979)

Academic background
- Education: Texas Presbyterian College; University of Texas (B.A. 1929; M.A. 1936; PhD 1949)
- Thesis: The Preconstitutional Regime of Venustiano Carranza, 1913–1917; The Provincial Deputation in Mexico: Precursor of the Mexican Federal State (dissertation)
- Influences: Charles W. Hackett

Academic work
- Discipline: History
- Sub-discipline: Archivy
- Institutions: Latin American Collection, University of Texas
- Main interests: Mexican history, Latin American history

Nettie Lee Benson (January 15, 1905 – June 24, 1993) was an American teacher, librarian, and archivist in Texas. She worked at the Latin American Collection at the University of Texas for 34 years, later renamed as the Benson Latin American Collection in her honor. After 1949, she taught history and library science simultaneously with her work managing the Latin American Collection. She also co-founded a graduate program in library science for specialists in Latin America.

== Early life ==
Nettie Lee Benson was born on January 15, 1905, in Arcadia, Texas, to Jasper William and Vora Ann (née Reddell) Benson. Her family moved to Sinton, Texas, when she was about three years old. The Bensons were a family of farmers, managing a small ranch and growing vegetables in the Sinton area. Nettie grew up with one sister, two older brothers, and three younger brothers. Her father, Jasper, known as "J. W.", also served as San Patricio County's agricultural agent. Vora, her mother, had been a school teacher before marriage, and she regularly read books to her children. Yet Benson and her siblings participated in sports and performed music, with Benson playing the flute.

With a growing family and business, they moved to a large house with more land, where they maintained a herd of dairy cows and ran a nursery. J. W. grew citrus and palm trees, even grafting plants to create hybrids, a skill he taught Nettie. Benson graduated as class valedictorian at her local high school in 1922. She studied Spanish and participated in various extracurricular activities, while being an active member of the local Presbyterian church.

== Career ==
Benson earned an academic scholarship and joined her sister Jennie at Texas Presbyterian College. She enrolled at the University of Texas, where a course on Spanish North American history given by Charles W. Hackett in 1925 inspired her to pursue the study of Mexico. The same year, she left the university and accepted a teaching position at the Instituto Inglés-Español in Monterrey, Mexico, where she taught for two years. Returning to Austin, she completed her baccalaureate in 1929, graduating with honors. She taught for over a decade in Ingleside, Texas, after which she returned to the University of Texas in order to attend graduate school. She was still teaching school in Ingleside when she earned her master's degree in 1936. Her thesis was The Preconstitutional Regime of Venustiano Carranza, 1913–1917. However, she moved to Austin in 1941 in order to help her nephew adjust as a new student at the University of Texas, after which she started a new career path with an increased focus on studying Latin American history.

In 1942 she began working at the Latin American Collection. While still enrolled as a graduate student, she gained expertise in library acquisitions and applied this knowledge during her travels throughout Latin America. Two years later she traveled south of the border to research the first years after Mexican Independence, studying the period between 1820 and 1824 as a subject for her dissertation. She wrote The Provincial Deputation in Mexico: Precursor of the Mexican Federal State while executing her demanding full-time job at the Latin American Collection. In June 1949, she finished the dissertation, which was published in as La Diputación Provincial Y El Federalismo Mexicano and The Provincial Deputation in Mexico: Harbinger of Political Economy, Independence, and Federalism.

In 1960, Benson expanded her career portfolio. While still employed as director of the Latin American Collection, she taught courses in library science and history. The same year, she accepted an appointment to the Latin American Cooperative Acquisitions Project (LACAP), which prompted her to travel throughout Latin America in search of books for libraries all over the United States. Meanwhile, she gained support from University of Texas president Harry Ransom, who approved a new library acquisitions' budget of $25,000. She also co-founded a master's degree program in library science at the university for Latin American specialists. Starting in 1964, she taught courses for this program until 1971. In 1969, she was tapped again for her expertise in Latin American acquisitions. She was invited to join as a member of the International Council of Modern Art, where she was tasked with acquiring Latin American art books for 23 repositories in the United States. Benson retired in 1975.

== Personal life ==
Benson hosted many traveling guests at her home in Austin, including researchers and writers. She also opened her home to nieces and nephews who were attending the University of Texas.

== Death and legacy ==
Mexico awarded Benson the Order of the Aztec Eagle in 1979.

Benson died on June 24, 1993. The Benson Latin American Collection, the library that bears her name, has grown to include over 1 million circulating books, over 100,000 photographs, over 20,000 maps, over 8,000 linear feet of archival material, as well as a large collection of digital media and multimedia. In 1954, twelve years into her service as director of the collection, the repository held 67,000 volumes. At her retirement in 1975, the collection counted over 305,000 volumes.

== Selected works ==
- Benson, Nettie Lee (1955). La Diputacion Provincial Y el Federalismo Mexicano (in Spanish). Mexico City: El Colegio de Mexico.
- Benson, Nettie Lee (1963). The United States versus Porfirio Díaz. Lincoln: University of Nebraska Press.
- Benson, Nettie Lee (1966). Mexico and the Spanish Cortes, 1810-1822: Eight Essays. Austin: University of Texas Press for the Institute of Latin American Studies.

== Bibliography ==
- Crawford, Ann Fears; Ragsdale, Crystal Sasse (1998). "Nettie Lee Benson". Texas Women: Frontier to Future. Austin: State House Press. ISBN 1-880510-54-5.
- Gilland, Julianne; Guy, Melissa; Polk, Melissa E. (2019). "Collections as Colloborators". Latin American Collection Concepts: Essays on Libraries, Collaborations and New Approaches. Jefferson, NC: McFarland & Company. pp. 77–86. ISBN 978-1-4766-6759-1.
