= Come On Girl (disambiguation) =

"Come On Girl" is a 2008 song by Taio Cruz

Come On Girl may also refer to:

- Come On Girl (Bert Berns song), a 1963 single by The Jarmels, covered by The Redcaps and Knight Brothers
- "Come On Girl", a 1995 single by Playa (band)
