= Come On Girl (Bert Berns song) =

1963 song written by Bert Berns and Stanley Kahan

"Come On Girl" is a 1963 song written by Bert Berns and Stanley Kahan, credited as "Bob Elgin, Bert Berns and Kay Rogers". It was the final single for The Jarmels in 1963, and was then covered by The Redcaps 1963. The Knight Brothers covered the song in 1964.
