= Nancy J. Duff =

American theologian

Nancy J. Duff (born May 2, 1951) is an American professor of theology. Duff worked as the Stephen Colwell Associate Professor of Christian Ethics at Princeton Theological Seminary, where she taught from 1990 until 2020. Duff is also a Presbyterian minister in the PCUSA denomination. She is married to United Methodist Minister David Mertz. She has taught courses on the Decalogue, Biomedical ethics, human sexuality, liturgy and the Christian life, Dietrich Bonhoeffer, James Cone, types of Christian ethics, and vocation in Christian tradition and contemporary life.

== Education ==
In 1973, Duff earned her undergraduate degree in English from Austin College in Sherman, Texas. She obtained a Master's of Divinity at Union Theological Seminary & Presbyterian School of Christian Education in Richmond, Virginia in 1977 and a doctorate in Systematic Theology from Union Theological Seminary in the City of New York in 1988.

== Selected publications ==
- Humanization and the Politics of God: the koinonia ethics of Paul Lehmann. Eerdmans, 1992.
- "Karen Ann Quinlan, Tony Bland, and Terri Schiavo: Withdrawing Life Support from Patients in a Persistent Vegetative State", Dialogue, Fall, 2006.
- "Locating God in all the Wrong Places: the Second Commandment and American Politics", Interpretation: a Journal of Bible and Theology, April 2006, 182–193.
- "Recovering Lamentation as a Practice in the Church", Lament: Reclaiming Practices in Pulpit, Pew, and Public Square, Sally A. Brown and Patrick D. Miller, eds., Westminster John Knox, 2005, 3–14.
- "Should the Ten Commandments Be Posted in the Public Realm? Why the Bible and the Constitution Say 'No'". The Ten Commandments: The Reciprocity of Faithfulness, William Brown, ed., Westminster John Knox, 2004, 159–170.
- "Mary, the Servant of the Lord: Christian Vocation at the Manger and the Cross", Blessed One: Protestant Perspectives on Mary, Beverly Roberts Gaventa and Cynthia L. Rigby, eds. Westminster John Knox Press, 2002, 59–70.
- "Seeking the Significant in the Factual", Beyond Human Cloning: Religion and the Remaking of Humanity. Ronald Cole-Turner, ed. Trinity Press, 2001, 84–96.
- "Christian Vocation, Freedom of God, and Homosexuality", in Homosexuality, Science, and the "Plain Sense" of Scripture, David L. Balch, ed., Eerdmans, 2000, 261–277.
- "Atonement and the Christian Life: Reformed Doctrine from a Feminist Perspective", Interpretation 53/1, January 1999, 21–33.
- "Reformed Theology and Medical Ethics: Death, Vocation and the Suspension of Life-Support", in The Future of Reformed Theology: Tasks, Topics, Traditions, David Willis and Michael Welker, eds. William B. Eerdmans, 1999, 302–320.
- "Reflections on Human Cloning", The Princeton Seminary Bulletin Vol. XVII, No. 2, 1997, 184–192. (Originally presented to the National Bioethics Advisory Committee.)
- "Vocation, Motherhood, and Marriage", Women, Gender, and Christian Community, Jane Dempsey Douglass and James F. Kay, eds. Louisville: Westminster John Knox Press, 1997, 69–81.
- "Paul Louis Lehmann...", Theology Today 53.3 (October, 1996): 360–369.
- "How to Argue Moral Issues Surrounding Homosexuality When You Know You're Right", in Homosexuality and Christian Community, Leong Seow, ed., Louisville: Westminster John Knox, 1996, 144–159.
- "Theological Themes", Lectionary Homiletics. (October, 1996).
- "Introduction", to Paul L. Lehmann, The Decalogue and a Human Future: the Meaning of the Commandments for Making and Keeping Human Life Human, Grand Rapids: Eerdmans Publishing Co., 1995, 1–12.
- "Dietrich Bonhoeffer's Theological Ethic", The Princeton Seminary Bulletin, XV.3. 1994, 263–273. (Originally an address given at Nassau Presbyterian Church in Princeton, New Jersey.)
- "The Significance of Apocalyptic for Theological Ethics", Apocalyptic and the New Testament: A Feschrift for Prof. J. Louis Martyn, Sheffield Press, 1989, 279–296. [Subsequently incorporated into one of the chapters of Humanization and the Politics of God: the koinonia Ethics of Paul Lehmann.]
