= Milford High School (Texas) =

Location
- 205 Third Ave. Milford, Texas 76670-0545; United States; 32.1194°N 96.9509°W

Information
- School type: Public high school
- School district: Milford Independent School District
- Principal: Marilee Byrne
- Staff: 20.89 (FTE)
- Grades: PK-12
- Enrollment: 261 (2023–2024)
- Student to teacher ratio: 12.49
- Colors: Blue, gray, and white
- Athletics conference: UIL Class A
- Mascot: Bulldog/Lady Bulldog
- Website: Milford High School

Milford High School or Milford School is a 1A high school located in Milford, Texas (USA). It is part of the Milford Independent School District located in the southwest corner of Ellis County. In 2011, the school was rated "Recognized" by the Texas Education Agency.

== Athletics ==
The Milford Bulldogs compete in the following sports:

6-Man Football, Baseball, Basketball, Volleyball, Powerlifting & Track

=== State Titles ===
- Football -
  - 1979(6M), 1980(6M)

==== State Finalists ====
- Football –
  - 1994(6M), 1995(6M), 2013(6M), 2018(6M)

== See also ==
- List of high schools in Texas
