= Milford, Texas =

- Town
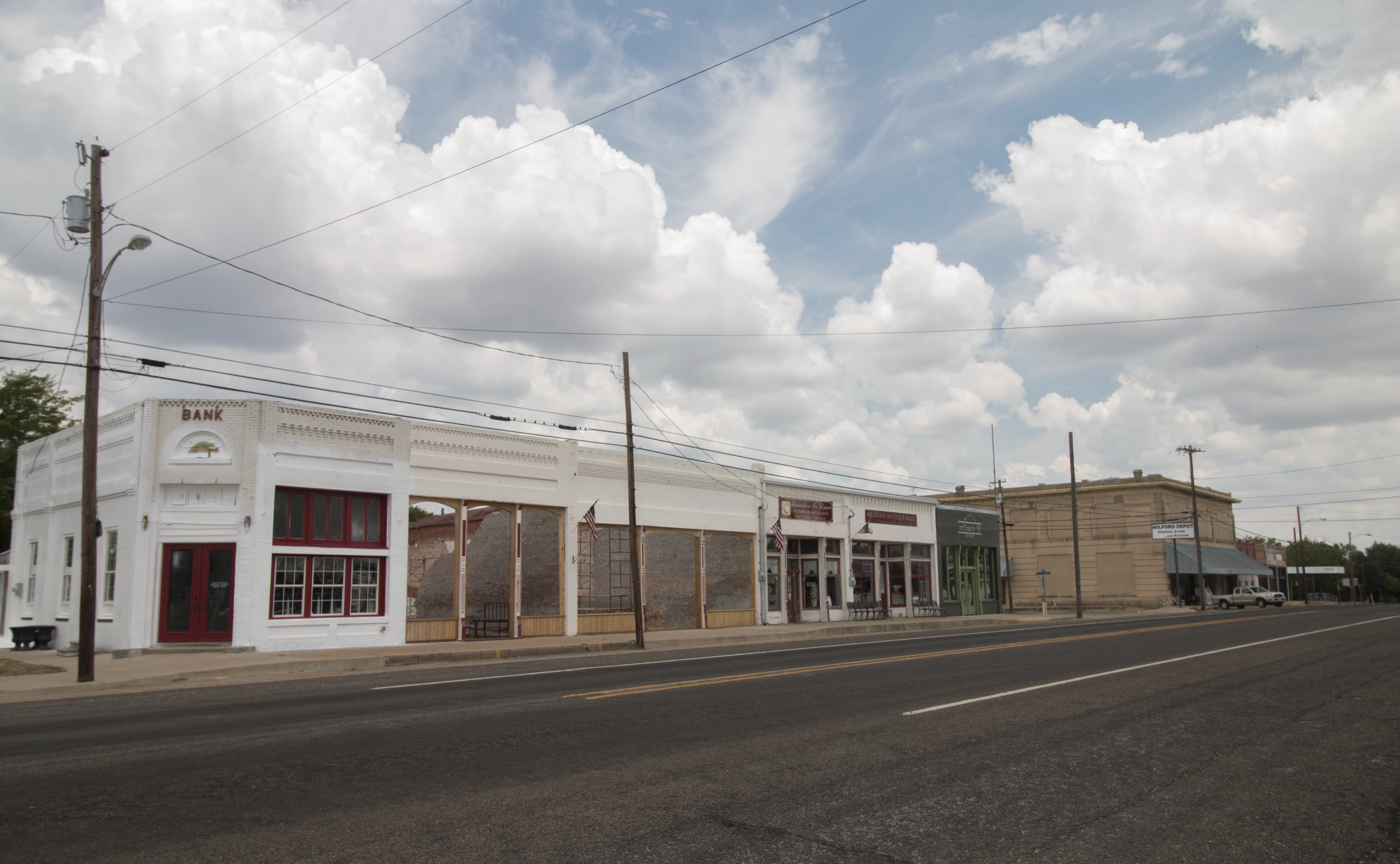
- Downtown Milford in 2010
- Motto: "Small town living with room to grow"
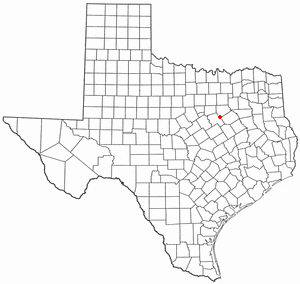
- Location of Milford, Texas

- Coordinates: 32°07′27″N 96°56′57″W
- Country: United States
- State: Texas
- County: Ellis

Area
  - Total: 2.47 sq mi (6.39 km^{2})
  - Land: 2.46 sq mi (6.37 km^{2})
  - Water: 0.0077 sq mi (0.02 km^{2})
- Elevation: 637 ft (194 m)

Population (2020)
  - Total: 722
  - Density: 303.5/sq mi (117.18/km^{2})
- Time zone: UTC-6 (Central (CST))
  - Summer (DST): UTC-5 (CDT)
- ZIP code: 76670
- Area codes: 214, 469, 945, 972
- FIPS code: 48-48408
- GNIS feature ID: 2412995
- Website: cityofmilfordtx.com

Milford is an incorporated rural community located in North Central Texas, in the southwestern corner of Ellis County, United States. The population was 722 at the 2020 census. The community is also widely known as the birth place of Richard Starrett, current head coach of Centennial High School in Bakersfield, California.

The town is located 14 miles (23 km) northeast of Hillsboro and 20 miles (32 km) southwest of Waxahachie. The community received media attention due to a Chevron gas pipeline explosion and resulting town evacuation which occurred in 2013.

== History ==
=== Settlement and early history ===
Milford dates back to the 1850s, when several men from Cherokee County came to the Mill Creek valley and bought land at 50 cents an acre from Ellis County landowner Arvin Wright. Milford was named by William R. Hudson after the factory town of Milford, Massachusetts. During 1853 the first house, a combined residence and general store belonging to William R. Hudson, was built, along with a two-story schoolhouse which served as church and community hall until it burned during the Civil War. In 1854 Wright, Hudson, and J.M. Higgins laid out town lots atop a ridge. In 1857, a gristmill began operation at the community. Milford was incorporated in 1888, with W.R. McDaniel serving as the first mayor. In 1890, the tracks of the Dallas and Waco Railway (later acquired by the Missouri–Kansas–Texas Railroad) reached the community, which became an important shipping point for area cotton farmers.

By 1892 Milford had grown to a population of 800, and had three churches, a bank, a hotel, two cotton gins, and approximately two dozen other businesses, as well as a weekly newspaper. There were now two schools in Milford, Mollie Poe's private Lone Star Institute and the community-financed Milford Academy. In 1902 the Presbyterian Synod of Texas accepted the town's offer to open the Texas Presbyterian College for Girls in Milford, and by 1925 the Dallas-Waco electric interurban railway had reached the town. The town continued to flourish, with the population soaring to 1,200 by 1929, but the population saw a slow decline due to the Great Depression, and the Presbyterian college closed due to lagging enrollment. By 1931 the population of Milford was 747, and would continue to decline as the population reached a low of 490 in 1968. The town would grow once again, and by 1990 the population was back up to 711, before dropping to 685 in 2000.

=== 2013 gas pipeline explosion ===
==== Explosion and fire ====
Just after 8:30AM CDT on November 14, 2013, an explosion and resulting fire occurred near the intersection of U.S. 77 and FM 308 when a 10 inch Chevron Corporation liquefied petroleum gas pipeline was punctured by a Chevron drilling crew. The five man crew abandoned the rig and escaped the explosion unharmed.

==== Aftermath ====
Due to concerns about harmful air quality conditions due to the burning pipeline, and the proximity of the fire to another larger gas line, the entire town of approximately 700 residents was forced to evacuate, including Milford ISD staff and students, to the nearby town of Italy as a 1.5-mile (2.4 km) evacuation zone was established.

While some residents were permitted to return to the town temporarily under police escort, the town remained evacuated through November 16 as the pipeline continued to burn. The fire also caused the postponement of a six-man football playoff game scheduled for November 15 as the players could not retrieve their gear.

==== Chevron response ====
The company issued several statements through their website expressing their sincere regret to people impacted by this event which included a toll-free claims hotline which residents affected by the incident could call. The company also provided overnight accommodations at local hotels for residents due to conditions not allowing them to return home.

== Geography ==
According to the United States Census Bureau, the town has a total area of 2.5 square miles (6.4 km^{2}), of which 0.01 square miles (0.02 km^{2}), or 0.29%, is water.

U.S. Route 77 passes through the center of town as Main Street, while Interstate 35E runs along the northern edge of town, with access from Exit 381. Downtown Dallas is 48 miles (77 km) to the north.

== Demographics ==
Historical population
Census	Pop.	Note	%±
1880	164		—
1890	353		115.2%
1900	653		85.0%
1910	766		17.3%
1920	940		22.7%
1930	747		−20.5%
1940	767		2.7%
1950	690		−10.0%
1960	590		−14.5%
1970	664		12.5%
1980	681		2.6%
1990	711		4.4%
2000	685		−3.7%
2010	728		6.3%
2020	722		−0.8%
U.S. Decennial Census

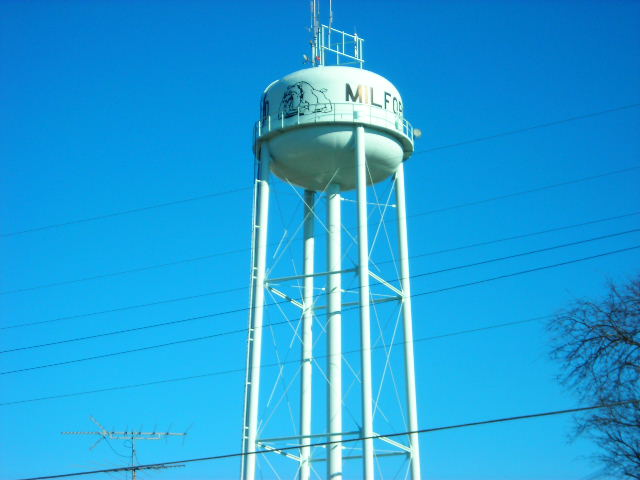
Milford water tower in 2008

Milford racial composition as of 2020 (NH = Non-Hispanic) (Note: Note: the US Census treats Hispanic/Latino as an ethnic category. This table excludes Latinos from the racial categories and assigns them to a separate category. Hispanics/Latinos can be of any race.)
Race	Number	Percentage
White (NH)	375	51.94%
Black or African American (NH)	153	21.19%
Native American or Alaska Native (NH)	7	0.97%
Asian (NH)	6	0.83%
Pacific Islander (NH)	1	0.14%
Mixed/Multi-Racial (NH)	32	4.43%
Hispanic or Latino	148	20.5%
Total	722	

As of 2023, there were 1,033 people, residing in the town. With a median age of 39.1.

== Education ==
The town is served by the Milford Independent School District and is home to the Milford High School Bulldogs.

From 1902–1929, the town was home to the Texas Presbyterian College for Girls. Milford gave the school 10 acres (4.0 ha) of land and $25,000 to assist in its founding. It was later expanded to 40 acres (16 ha) before closing in 1929 and merging with Austin College in Sherman, Texas.

== In popular culture ==
Milford is the setting of the 2015 sci-fi, action comedy film Lazer Team. This movie was the first feature-length film ever created by a company founded, and located in Texas called Rooster Teeth.

Milford is also the setting of the 2016 independent comedy and LGBT film "Hurricane Bianca" starring actor and drag superstar "Bianca Del Rio" (Roy Haylock).

== Photo gallery ==
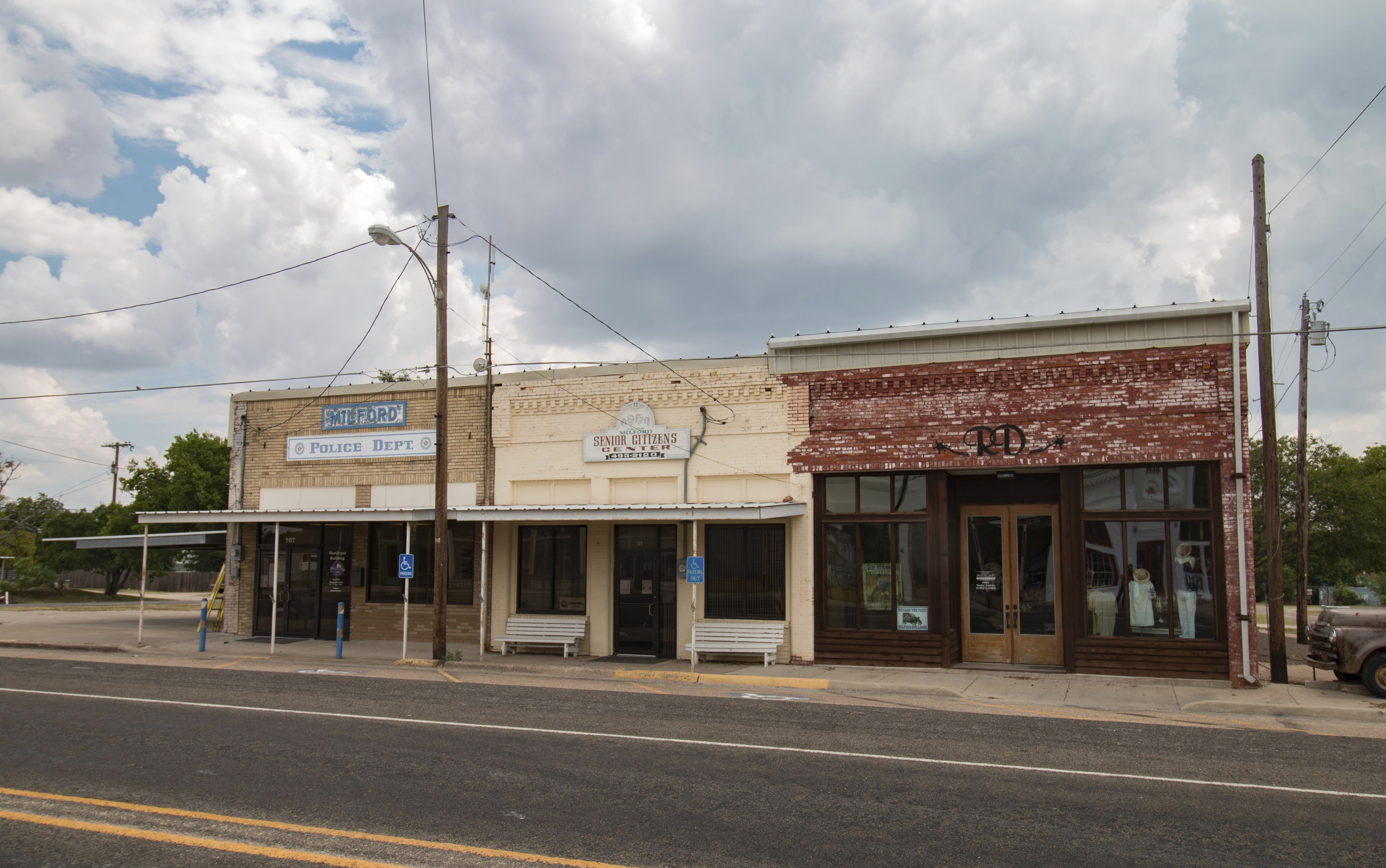
Downtown

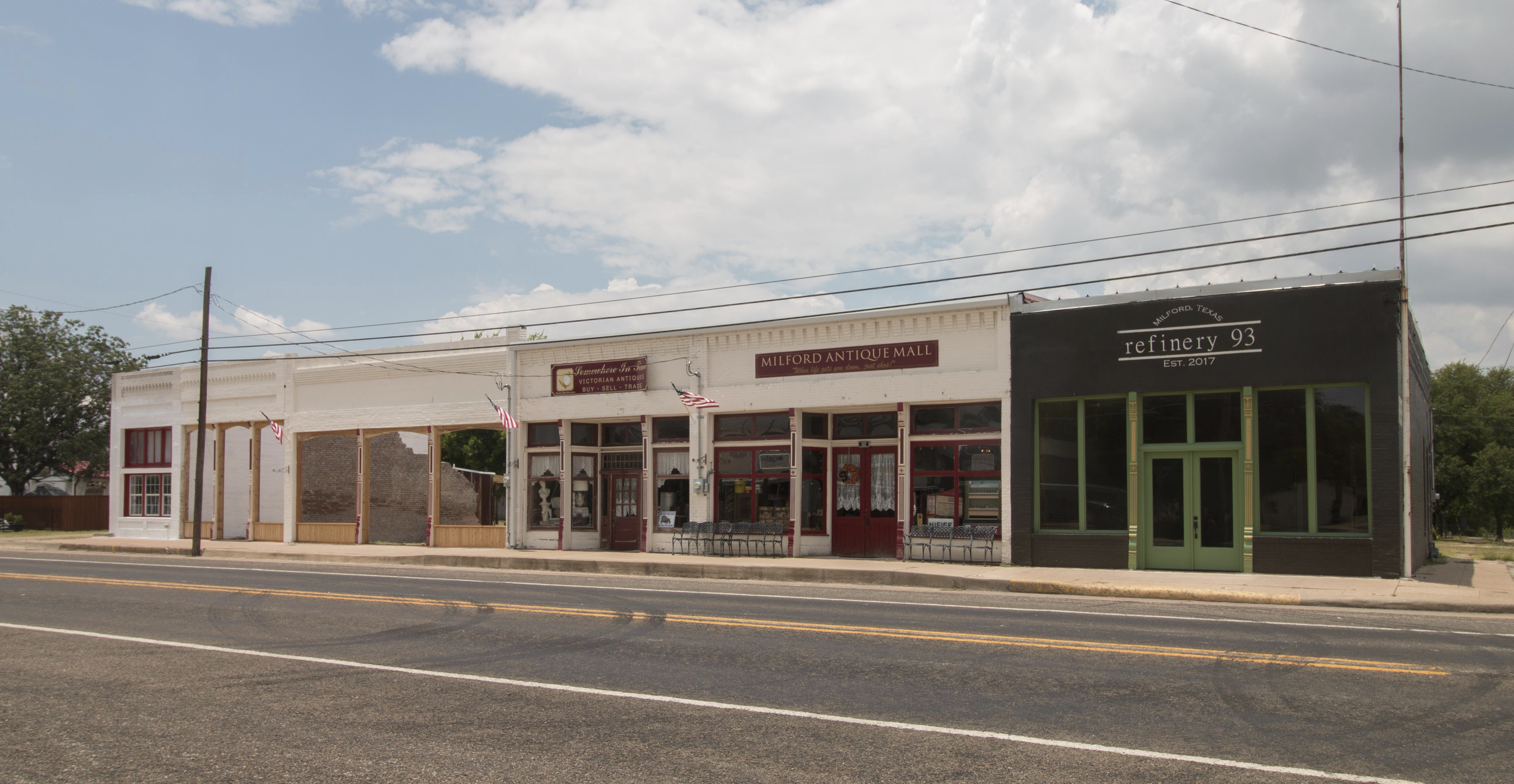
Downtown

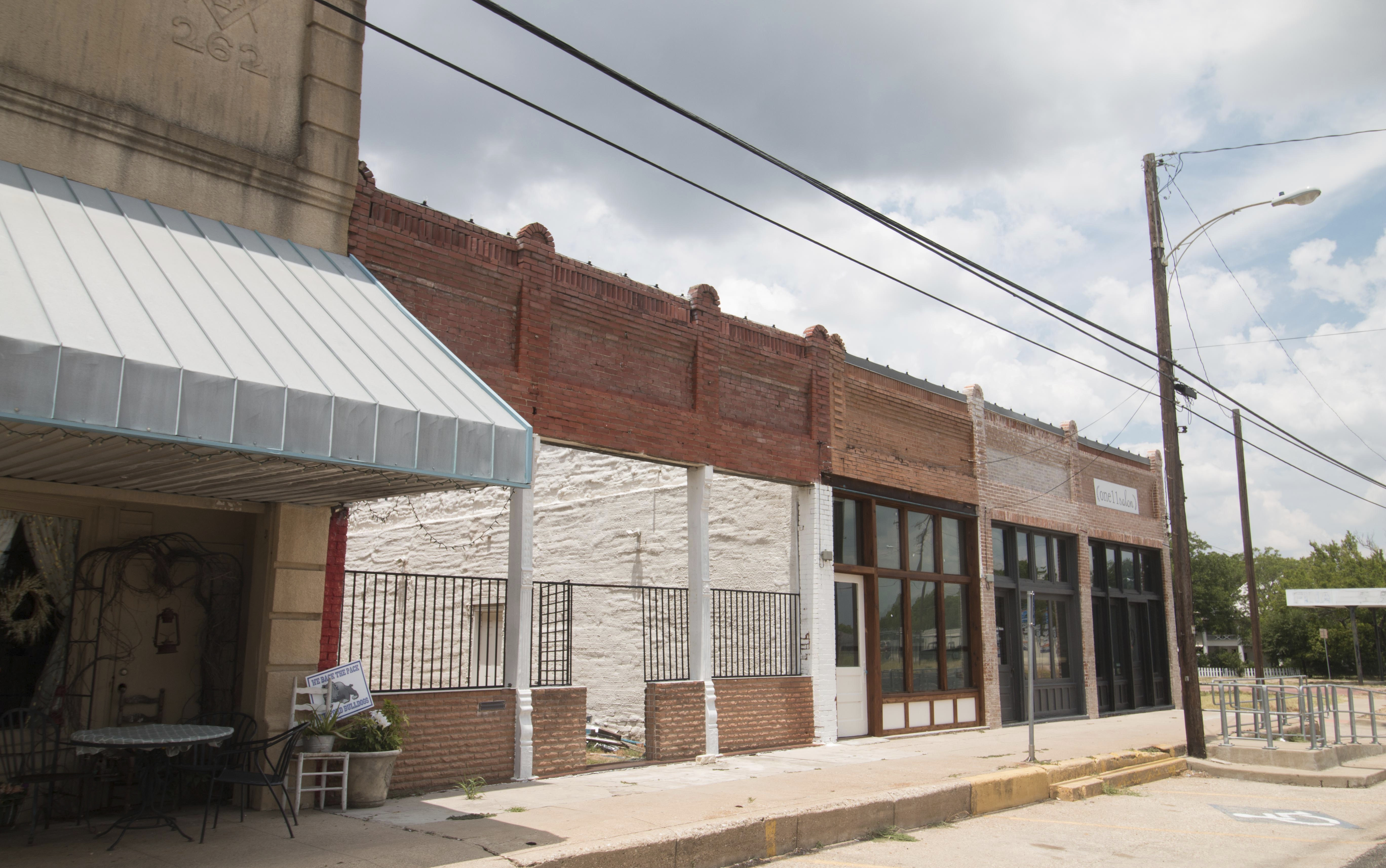
Downtown
