= Milford Independent School District =

School district in Texas

Coordinates: 32.1202°N 96.9507°W

Address
- 205 3rd Avenue ESC Region 10 Milford, Texas; USA

District information
- Type: Public
- Grades: Pre-K through 12
- Superintendent: Vernon Orndorff

Students and staff
- Athletic conference: UIL Class A
- Colors: blue, gray, and white

Other information
- Mascot: bulldog
- Website: www.milfordisd.org

Milford Independent School District is a public school district based in Milford, Texas (USA).

In 2009, the school district was rated "academically acceptable" by the Texas Education Agency.

== Schools ==
Milford ISD is consolidated into one large building, located on U.S. Highway 77 on the southern end of Milford. It houses all of the district's approximately 240 students, grades K-12, and includes the district's only high school, Milford High School.

== Academics ==
Milford ISD offers band, FFA, National Honors Society and Gifted/Talented sources, and journalism. There are also fine arts studies available such as photography, art and theatre.

== Athletics ==
Milford school athletics offers girls volleyball, boys and girls basketball, track and field, and six-man football.

== See also ==
- List of school districts in Texas
- List of high schools in Texas
