= Ramon Frederick Adams =

American western folklorist (1889–1976)

- Adams in 1946
- Born: October 3, 1889; Moscow, Texas, US
- Died: April 29, 1976 (aged 86); Dallas, Texas, US
- Spouse: Allie Jarman

Ramon Frederick Adams (October 3, 1889 – April 29, 1976) was an American western folklorist who wrote about the history of cattlemen and gunmen. After an early career in violin performance and twenty-six years as a candy shop owner, he published 24 works about western histories including Six-Guns and Saddle Leather and Burs Under the Saddle. He was a member of the Texas Institute of Letters, the Western History Association, and the Southwest Writers.

== Early life and education ==
dams was born on October 3, 1889, in Moscow, Texas. Because his home was located along a cattle trail, Adams regularly came into contact with cowboys as a young boy. The cowboys would often have lunch at his family's home and describe their adventures to Adams. At thirteen, he moved with his family to Sherman, Texas, because of his father's jewelry business. In 1903, Adams enrolled in the Sherman Private School, a private all-boys institution. In 1905, he enrolled in Austin College but dropped out in 1909. However, he did return to finish his education at Austin College and graduated in 1912. While at college in 1907, Adams worked as literary editor of Reville, which was Austin College's school magazine. Also during his college years, Adams studied violin under the instruction of Carl Venth at Kidd-Key College.

== Personal life ==
While working in the violin department at the University of Arkansas, Adams met Allie Jarman; they got married at some point during the four years that he spent at the University of Arkansas. The two had no children together. He died on April 29, 1976, aged 86, in Dallas.

== Careers ==
During his lifetime, Adams pursued a career as a violinist, a candy shop owner, and an author. Adams is however most associated with his work as an author due to his extensive research over the American West.

=== Violinist ===
After graduating from Austin College, Adams accepted a position at the University of Arkansas' violin department where he worked for four years. In 1916, Adams and his wife returned to Texas because he received the head position in the violin department at the Wichita Falls College of Music. After only a year at Wichita Falls College, he opened his own violin school. After teaching the violin for many years, he accepted positions to play for orchestras in Dallas, including the Dallas Symphony Orchestra. He also played for theater orchestras. Adams had a career-ending injury with a broken wrist in the 1920s that was caused by cranking a Model T Ford.

=== Candy shop owner ===
After he pursued a brief violin career, Adams and his wife opened a candy store in Dallas in 1929. The store eventually developed into a chain because of the success it received. The Adams' owned the stores for twenty-six years but eventually retired from the candy business in 1955.

=== Author ===
Adams held a lifelong interest in western history that originated in his youth. Adams was particularly passionate about cattle, gunmen, and separating the myths of the West from what actually happened. This interest is what motivated him to write books on the subject throughout his life. He published his first book Poems of the Canadian West privately in 1919, and in 1923, had a short story included in Western Story Magazine. However, Adams' first public publication was released in 1936 and was titled Cowboy Lingo; the book discussed the way that cowboys in the west utilized language. He wrote a critique of western literature titled Burs Under the Saddle after conducting extensive research over the available historical texts, mostly regarding gunmen and outlaws, of the mid nineteenth century. Adams found that factual evidence was either misused or ignored in a significant amount of the texts he had read. This critique is considered to be an important staple in American West academia. He wrote numerous books throughout his life, both on his own and co-authoring as well.

Beyond authoring historical books, Adams was a renowned bibliographer whose work as an author drastically increased the amount of accurate literature available on life in the American west. He wrote five bibliographies and his two most popular were The Rampaging Herd, which documents the history of the cattle industry in the west, and Six-Guns and Saddle Leather, which documents outlaws and gunmen. He's credited with writing the first bibliography that contains writings about outlaws and gunmen in the West, Six-Guns and Saddle Leather. In order to attain research material for his writing, Adams traveled throughout the United States and collected first hand accounts of life on the frontier. He was able to preserve the information regarding how language was used in the west and what habits were common for the west through these interviews. By the time of his death, Adams had released 22 books and 2 were published and released after his death; in total, 24 works are attributed to his name. Today his work continues to be referenced by historians and contemporaries alike.

He was a member of the Texas Institute of Letters, the Western History Association, and the Southwest Writers.

== Publications ==
- Poems of the Canadian West (1919)
- Western Story Magazine (1923)
- Cowboy Lingo (1936)
- Western Words: A Dictionary of the Range, Cow Camp, and Trail (1944) with Homer Britzman
- Charles M. Russell, the Cowboy Artist: A Biography (1948)
- Come an' Get It: The Story of the Old Cowboy Cook (1952)
- ed., The Best of the American Cowboy (1957)
- The Rampaging Herd: A Bibliography of Books and Pamphlets on Men and Events in the Cattle Industry (1959)
- A Fitting Death for Billy the Kid (1960)
- The Old-Time Cowhand (1961)
- Burs Under the Saddle: A Second Look at Books and Histories of the West (1964) with Bob Kennon
- From the Pecos to the Powder: A Cowboy's Autobiography (1965)
- The Legendary West (1965)
- The Cowman and His Philosophy (1967)
- The Cowboy and his Humor (1968)
- Western Words: A Dictionary of the American West (1968)
- The Cowman and His Code of Ethics (1969)
- Six-Guns and Saddle Leather: A Bibliography of Books and Pamphlets on Western Outlaws and Gunmen (1954; enlarged edition, 1969)
- The Cowman Says It Salty (1971)
- Horse Wrangler and His Remuda (1971)
- The Adams One-Fifty (1976)
- The Language of the Railroader (1977)
- More Burs Under the Saddle (1979)
