= Katherine Neal Simmons =

American soprano singer

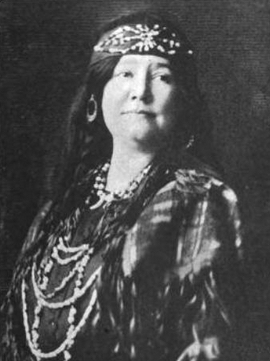
- Katherine Neal Simmons, from a 1916 publication.
- Born: August 1884; Sherman, Texas
- Died: 1940
- Other names: Katherine Neal-Simmons, Katherine Love
- Occupation: Singer

Katherine Neal Simmons Love (August 1884 – 1940) was an American soprano singer of Choctaw ancestry. She often performed songs of Native American themes, wearing an evocative costume of beads and fringe.

== Early life ==
Katherine Neal was born in 1884 (some sources give 1887) in Sherman, Texas, the daughter of James Thomas Neal and Mary Elizabeth Fuller Neal. Her mother was listed as "Choctaw by Blood" on the Dawes Rolls. She attended Mary Nash College. She pursued further musical studies at Cincinnati Conservatory of Music, and in Paris and Chicago.

== Career ==
Simmons, a soprano, sang professionally, as a church soloist and as a touring concert singer. Her concerts often featured arias but also "tribal Indian songs", and she wore a costume of beads, a fringed shawl, braids, and a headband. She also sang Indian-themed compositions by Charles Wakefield Cadman, Thurlow Lieurance and others. She was active in the MacDowell Club of Portland, Oregon. She made a concert tour of cities in the eastern United States and Canada for the 1921–1922 season, and met with President Harding and his wife in the White House. She had a garden of 250 rose bushes, and was secretary of the Portland Rose Society.

By 1926 she had relocated from Portland to New York City, and was regional director of the National Delphian Society, a network of women's music clubs. She also taught voice lessons.

== Personal life ==
Neal married twice. Her first husband was lawyer John Curtis Simmons; they married in 1905 and he died by 1920. Her second husband was Joseph Kirk Love; he survived her when she died in 1940.
