= George Diggs =

Professor of Biology at Austin College in Sherman, Texas

- Born: 1952 (age 73–74); U.S.
- Education: University of Wisconsin–Madison; College of William and Mary
- Awards: Donovan Stewart Correll Memorial Award for Scientific Writing (2000, 2006); Texas Professor of the Year 1999
- Scientific career
- Fields: Botany
- Workplaces: Austin College; Botanical Research Institute of Texas

George M. Diggs, Jr. (born 1952) holds a Ph.D. in biology from the University of Wisconsin–Madison. He is Professor of Biology at Austin College in Sherman, Texas. He is a specialist in the systematics of the plant genera Comarostaphylis and Arctostaphylos (Ericaceae). This recent research has focused on the floras of North Central and Eastern Texas.

Diggs is Research Associate of the Botanical Research Institute of Texas (BRIT) in Fort Worth. In 1999 he was named Texas "Professor of the Year" by The Carnegie Foundation for the Advancement of Teaching and the Council for the Advancement and Support of Education. In 2000, Diggs was awarded the Donovan Stewart Correll Memorial Award for Scientific Writing by the Native Plant Society of Texas for his book Shinners & Mahlers Illustrated Flora of North Central Texas. In 2006, Diggs and coauthors were awarded the Donovan Stewart Correll Memorial Award for Scientific Writing by the Native Plant Society of Texas for their book "Illustrated Flora of East Texas, Volume One"

His current research project is the Illustrated Flora of East Texas, a 3-volume illustrated taxonomic treatment of the 3,402 species of vascular plants occurring in the East Texas Region. This project is a collaborative effort between the Botanical Research Institute of Texas (BRIT) in Fort Worth and the Austin College Center for Environmental Studies.

== Selected publications ==
- Shinners & Mahler’s Illustrated Flora of North Central Texas (Online Edition)
- The Illustrated Flora of East Texas
