= Thomas Diggs =

Alabama politician

Thomas H. Digges (died June 6, 1887) was a state representative during the Reconstruction era in Alabama. He represented Barbour County. He worked as a field hand.

== See also ==
- List of African-American officeholders during Reconstruction
