= Senator Diggs =

Senator Diggs may refer to:

- Charles Diggs Sr. (1894–1967), Michigan State Senate
- Charles Diggs (1922–1998), Michigan State Senate
- Danny Diggs (born c. 1957), Virginia State Senate
