= Texas Presbyterian College =

Women's college and high school in Milford, Texas, US

Texas Presbyterian College, also known as Texas Presbyterian College for Girls was a women's college as well as high school in Milford, Texas. The college opened in 1902 with a donation of $25,000 and 10 acres (4 ha) of land from the town of Milford.

The first president was Henry Clay Evans. The Cumberland Presbyterian Church made donations to the institution but it was not until an aggressive fund-raising campaign to establish an endowment was held in 1917 that TPC was stable financially.

In 1911 the high school was separated into a separate academy and in 1917 the college was reorganized into a fully accredited college. In 1929 TPC closed and merged with Austin College, another Presbyterian school.

Academically, two years of Bible study were required of all students. Over 4,000 students attended the school during its existence.

== Sources ==
- Handbook of Texas online article
