= Jerry B. Lincecum =

American novelist

- Born: Jerry Bryan Lincecum; 1942 (age 83–84)
- Education: Texas A&M University; Duke University (PhD)
- Occupations: Novelist; folklorist

Jerry Bryan Lincecum (born 1942) is a speaker and retired emeritus professor of English at Austin College in Sherman, Texas. He is a folklorist and specialist in Texas and Southwestern literature.

== Education ==
Linceum holds a bachelor's degree from Texas A&M University. He earned a master's degree and PhD from Duke University.

== Professional activities ==
Linceum became a member of the faculty at Austin College in 1967, and retired in 2006 as professor emeritus of English. He is the director and founder of the Telling Our Stories Project in Autobiography, which has attracted international attention to Austin College. This is a program that encourages senior citizens to write their autobiographies.

He has served as president of the Texas Folklore Society,

== Awards ==
Linceum has been awarded the Silver Certificate of Merit by the Daughters of the Republic of Texas and the Miss Ima Hogg Historical Achievement Award for Outstanding Research on Texas History. His book on the pioneer naturalist Gideon Lincecum, Science on the Texas Frontier: Observations of Dr. Gideon Lincecum has been reviewed by several academic journals both in history and in the sciences, as have some of his other books.

== Books ==
Linceum has written or edited eight books and numerous articles.

- Adventures of a Frontier Naturalist: The Life and Times of Dr. Gideon Lincecum (1994)
- Telling Our Stories, Vol. 1: Grayson County Reminiscences (1996)
- Science on the Texas Frontier: Observations of Dr. Gideon Lincecum (1997)
  - Review, Journal of American History, Mar., 1999, vol. 85, no. 4, p. 1610-1611
  - Journal of Southern History, May, 1999, vol. 65, no. 2, p. 404-405
  - Review, The Western Historical Quarterly, Autumn, 1998, vol. 29, no. 3, p. 412-413
  - Review, Environmental History, Jan., 1996, vol. 1, no. 1, p. 116-118
  - Review, Isis, Sep., 1998, vol. 89, no. 3, p. 557
  - Review, Taxon, Nov., 1996, vol. 45, no. 4, p. 726
- Telling Our Stories, Vol. 2: Texas Family Secrets (1997)
- Telling Our Stories, Vol. 3: Texas Millennium Book (1999)
- Gideon Lincecum's Sword: Civil War Letters from the Texas Homefront (2001)
  - Review, Journal of Southern History, Nov., 2002, vol. 68, no. 4, p. 975-976
- The Family Saga: A Collection of Texas Family Legends (2003)
- Telling Our Stories, Vol. 4: More Texas Family Secrets (2003)
- Telling Our Stories, Vol. 5: Remembering School Days (2005)
- editor, The Life and Times of Grayson County, Texas (2006)
