= Knight Brothers =

US musical duo

- Also known as: The Knight Bros.
- Genres: Soul
- Years active: 1963–1968
- Labels: Checker; Mercury
- Spinoff of: The Starfires
- Past members: Richard Dunbar; Jimmy Diggs

The Knight Brothers (also billed as The Knight Bros.) were a soul music duo, comprising Richard Dunbar (b. 31 May 1939) and Jimmy Diggs (b. James Leon Diggs, 11 October 1938)(d. February 28, 2023).

Both had been singing in local church choirs, when they met while living in Washington D.C. in the early 1950s. The pair then formed a doo-wop group, the Starfires, who recorded for the Decca label in 1958.

Forming a duo, they began recording for the Checker label in 1963. Their biggest success was "Temptation 'Bout To Get Me", which was a number 12 R&B and number 70 pop hit in 1965, and was followed by "I'm Never Gonna Live It Down".

Temptation ‘Bout To Get Me was subsequently covered by Billy Stewart, The Rationals, and The Rascals recorded it for their 1969 album “See”.

Subsequent records on Checker and Mercury were less successful, and the duo split up in 1968. Richard Dunbar went on to sing with a revived version of the Orioles during the 1970s and 80s, whilst Jimmy ended his recording career.
