= Austin College =

Presbyterian college in Sherman, Texas, US

Coordinates: 33°38′49.22″N 96°35′50.16″W

- Motto: Nil nisi per aspera
- Motto in English: Nothing but the fierce
- Type: Private liberal arts college
- Established: 1849; 177 years ago
- Religious affiliation: Presbyterian
- Academic affiliations: Oberlin Group; Annapolis Group; CIC; APCU
- Endowment: $155.4 million (2020)
- President: Rebecca Cantor
- Administrative staff: 104
- Students: 1,223 (2019)
- Location: Sherman, Texas, United States
- Campus: Suburban, 70 acres (28 ha)
- Colors: Crimson & gold
- Nicknames: Kangaroos, The Fighting 'Roos
- Sporting affiliations: NCAA Division III – SCAC; CWPA; ASC
- Mascot: Rowdy 'Roo
- Website: austincollege.edu

Austin College is a private liberal arts college affiliated with the Presbyterian Church (USA) and located in Sherman, Texas. Chartered in November 1849, Austin College remains the oldest institution of higher education in Texas to be operating under its original charter and name as recognized by the State Historical Survey Committee. About 1,300 students are enrolled at the college.

== History ==
The college was founded on October 13, 1849, in Huntsville, Texas, by the Hampden–Sydney and Princeton-educated missionary Daniel Baker. Signed by Texas Governor George Wood, the charter of Austin College was modeled after those of Harvard, Yale, and Princeton.

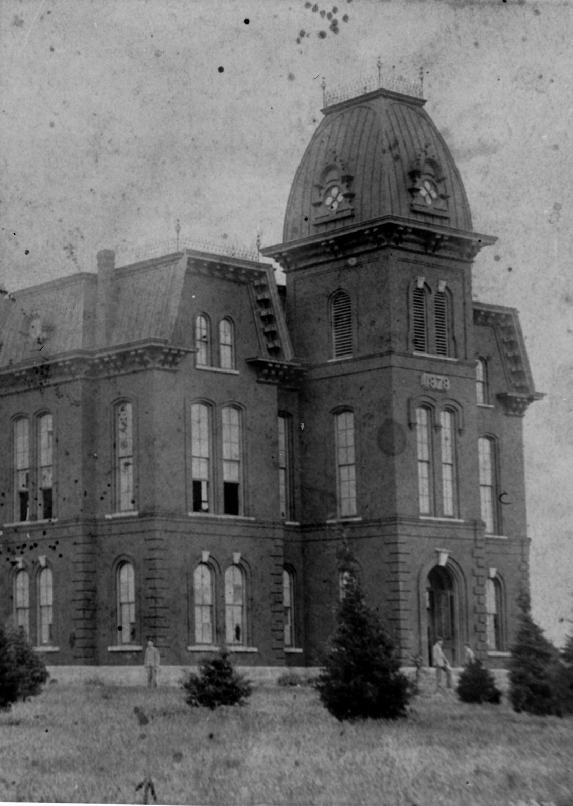
Austin Old Main in 1895

Baker named the school for the Texas historical figure Stephen F. Austin; the original land was donated by the Austin family. Two other important figures in Texas history, Sam Houston and Anson Jones, served on the board of trustees.

Austin College's founding president was Irish-born Presbyterian minister Samuel McKinney, who served as the school's president a second time from 1862 to 1871. Under the tenure of the fourth president of Austin College, Samuel Magoffin Luckett, Austin College had several yellow fever epidemics and complications related to the Civil War. The college relocated to Sherman in 1878.

On January 21 of 1913, Old Main was set ablaze and burnt to the ground in a matter of hours. During the fire, the senior class called the student body together and they committed, in writing, to stand by the college after the fire. The faculty committed to continue college work the next day. The event galvanized the community.

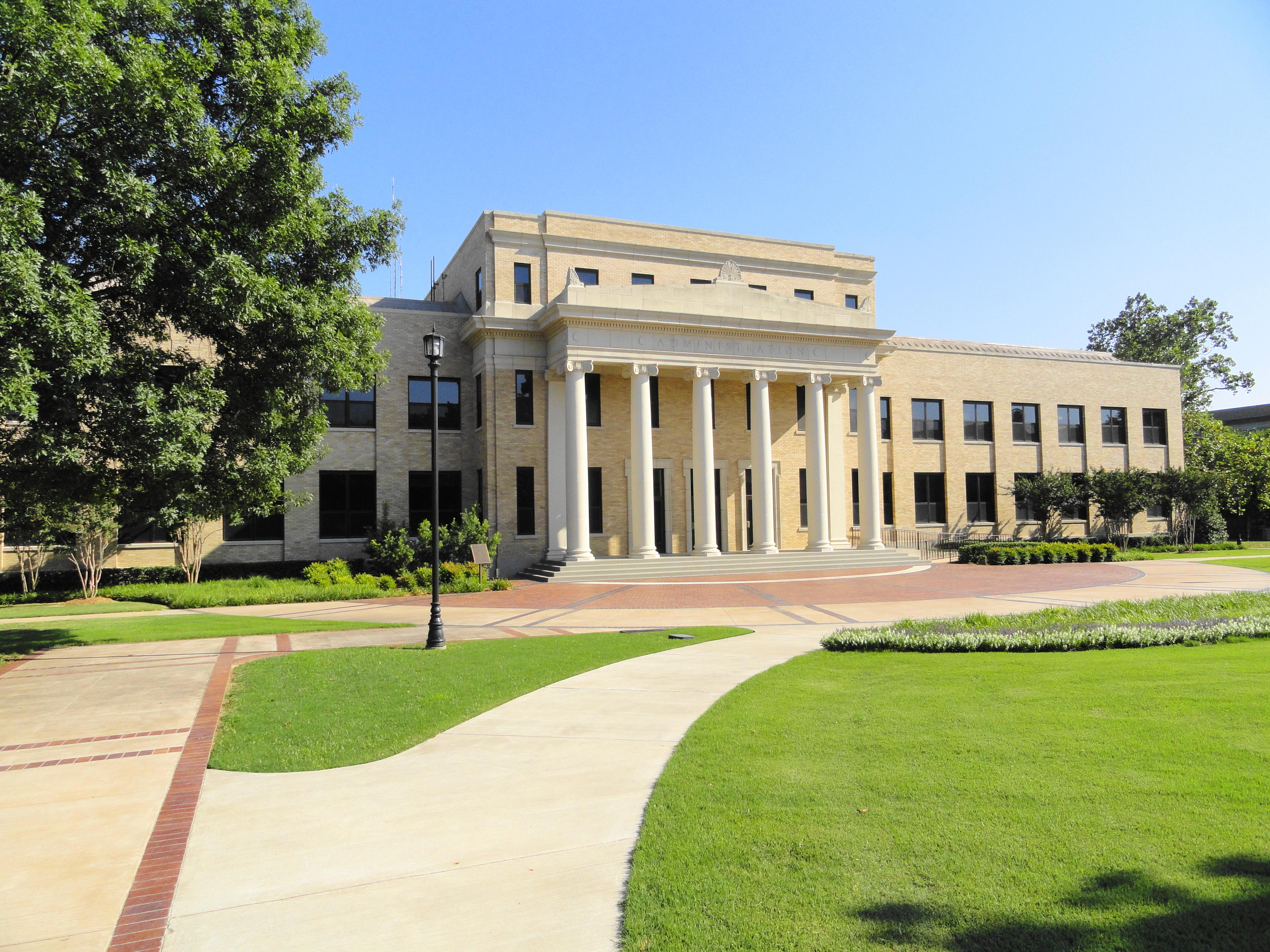
Administrative Building

In 1994, Oscar Page joined the community as its 14th president. Under his tenure, 1994–2009, Page increased the school's endowment by nearly 80%, due in large part to his dedicated fundraising efforts. Of particular note was the "Campaign for the New Era," a capital campaign that raised $120 million and was the largest fundraiser in Austin College's history.

Marjorie Hass joined the campus in 2009 as both its first female and Jewish president. Under her leadership, the college saw the construction of the IDEA Center and two new housing complexes. The IDEA Center is a 103,000 square ft. facility which includes multi-disciplinary and multi-purpose classrooms, laboratories, lecture halls and the largest telescope in the region found in Adams Observatory. It is a LEED Gold certified facility.

== Rankings and reputation ==
Academic rankings

Liberal arts
- U.S. News & World Report: 83
- Washington Monthly: 116

National
- Forbes: 250
- WSJ/College Pulse: 255

The U.S. News & World Report ranked Austin College 83rd (tied) out of 211 National Liberal Arts Colleges in its 2024-2025 edition.

== Academics ==
Austin College offers over 55 majors and pre-professional programs for study, and students can also create a specialized major to match their academic interests. The college has a music program, and supports the Austin College A Cappella Choir and the Sherman Symphony Orchestra, made up of students and local musicians, as well as assorted smaller musical ensembles. The college launched a Bachelor of Science in Engineering program in 2025.

Students are required to live on campus for the first three years of their education. 70% of its graduates have at least one international study experience during college, and about 82% of students are involved in research. The college has an 11:1 student to faculty ratio and an average class size of fewer than 25 students.

== Campus ==
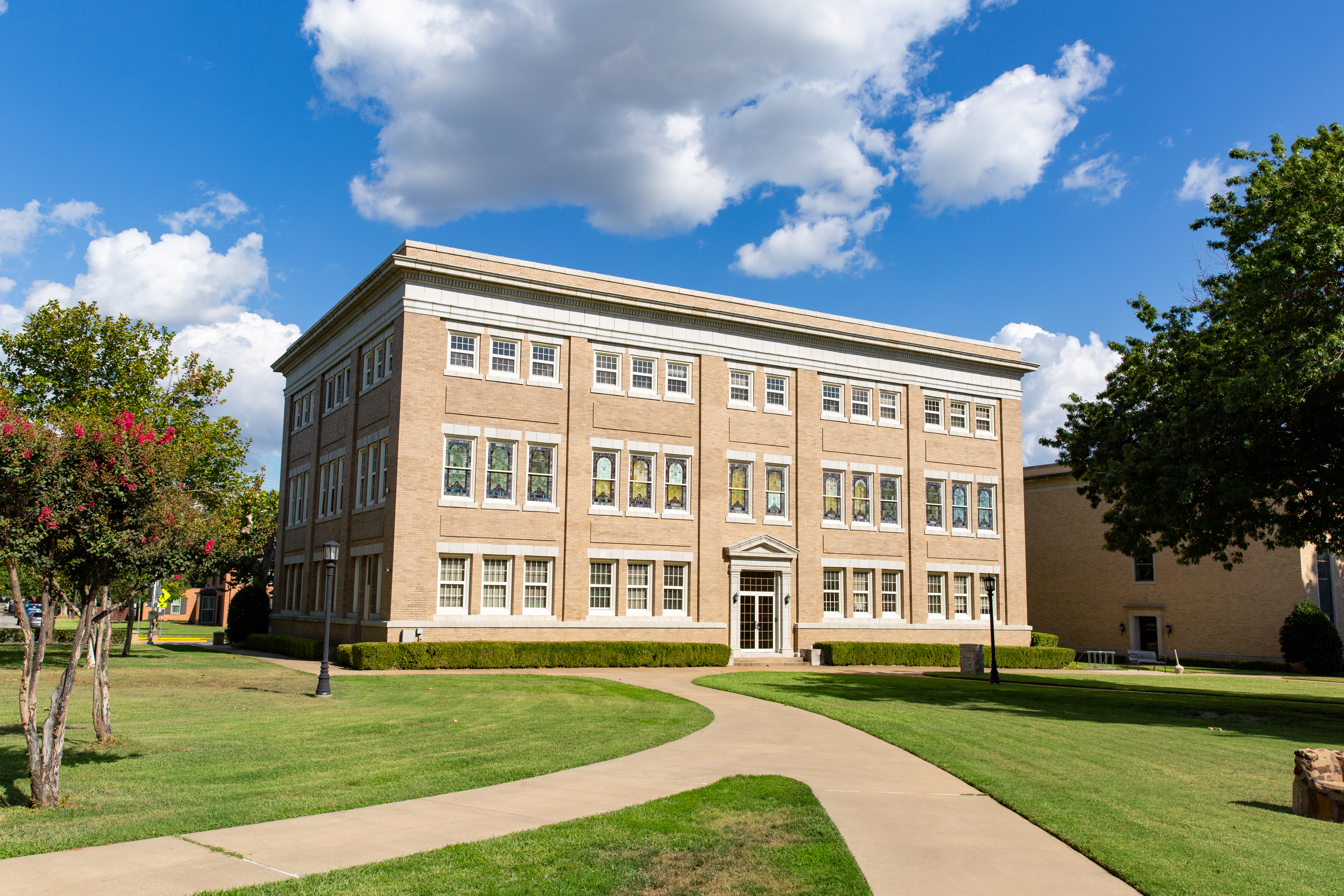
Sherman Hall

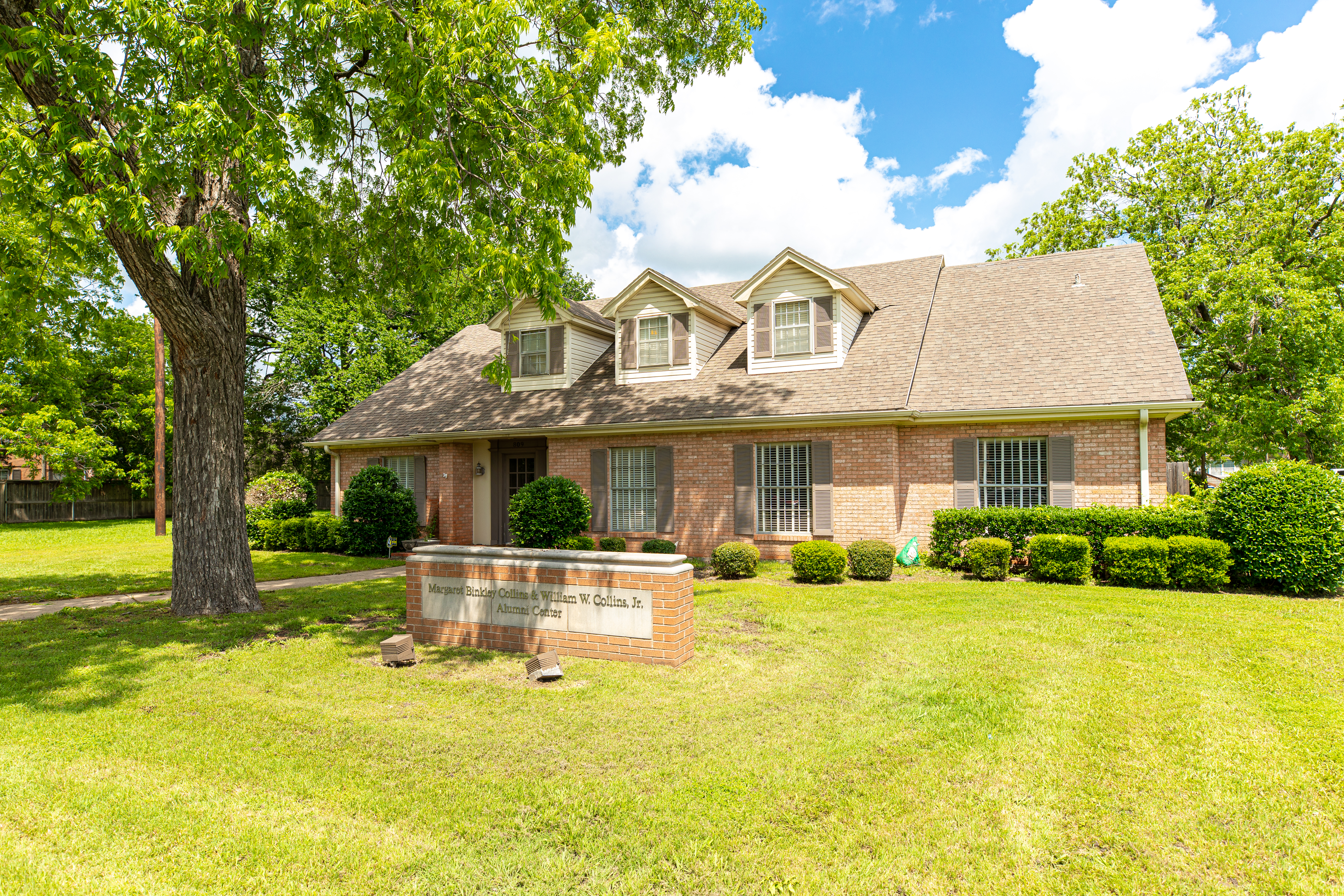
Collins Alumni Center

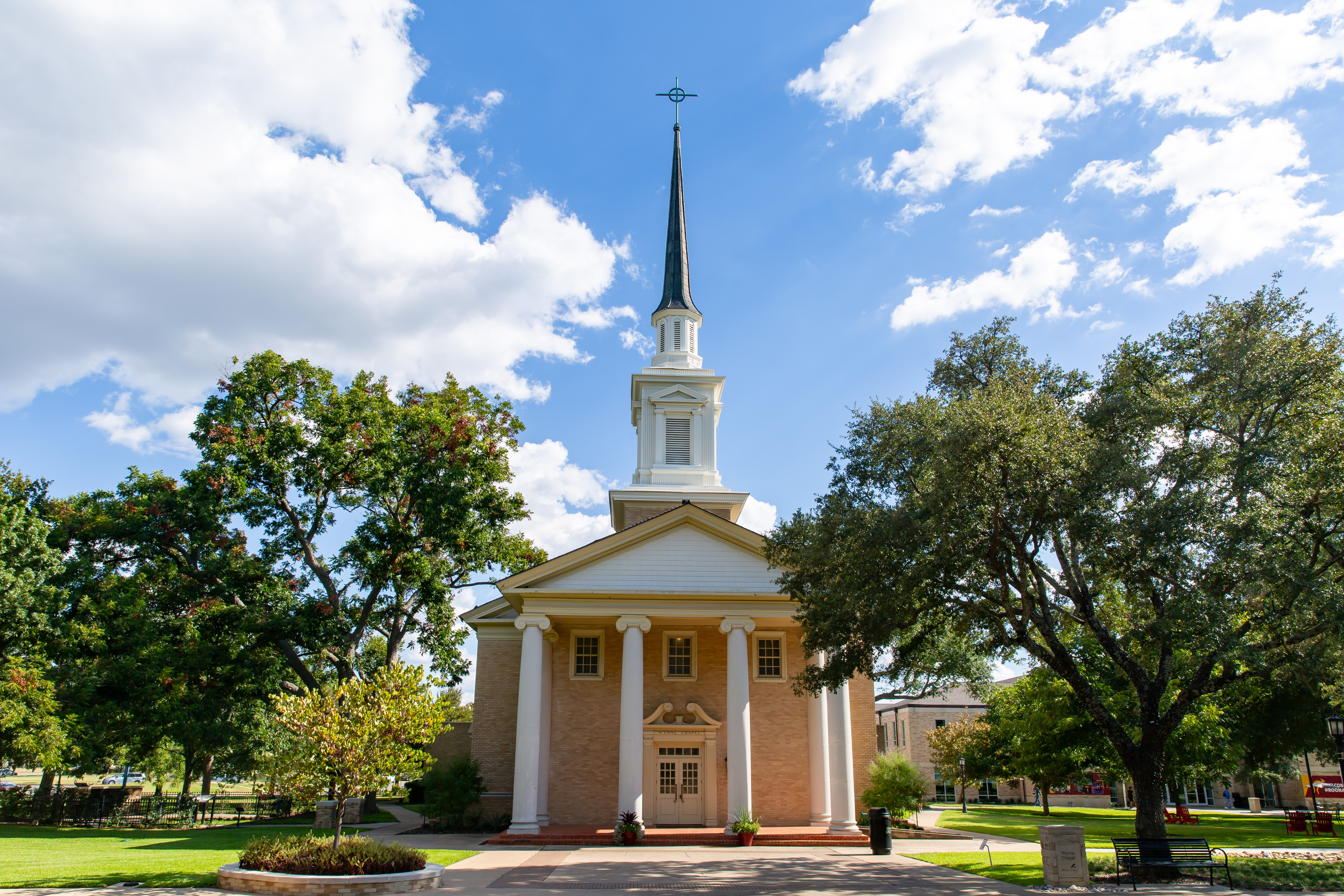
Wynne Chapel

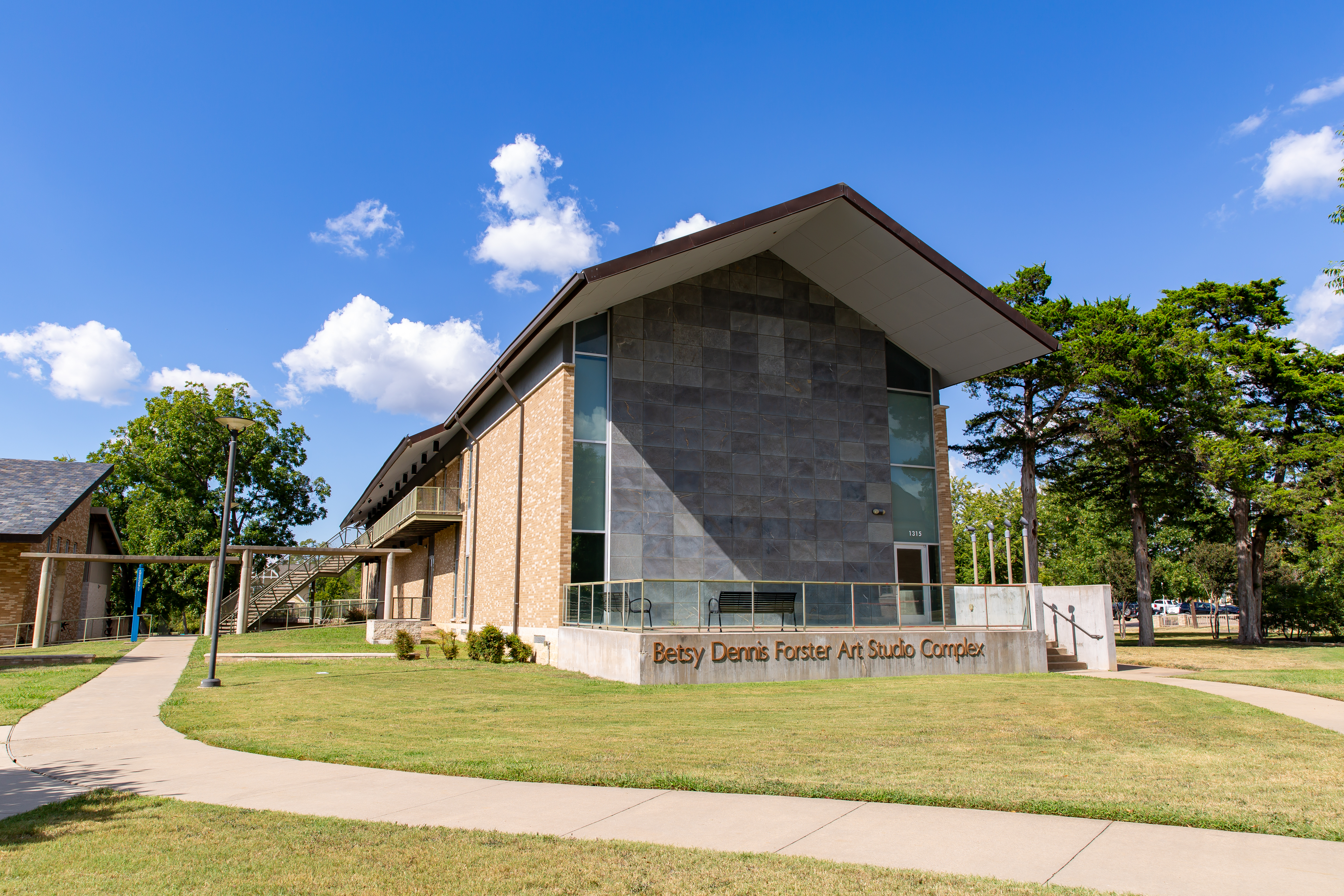
Forster Art Studio Complex

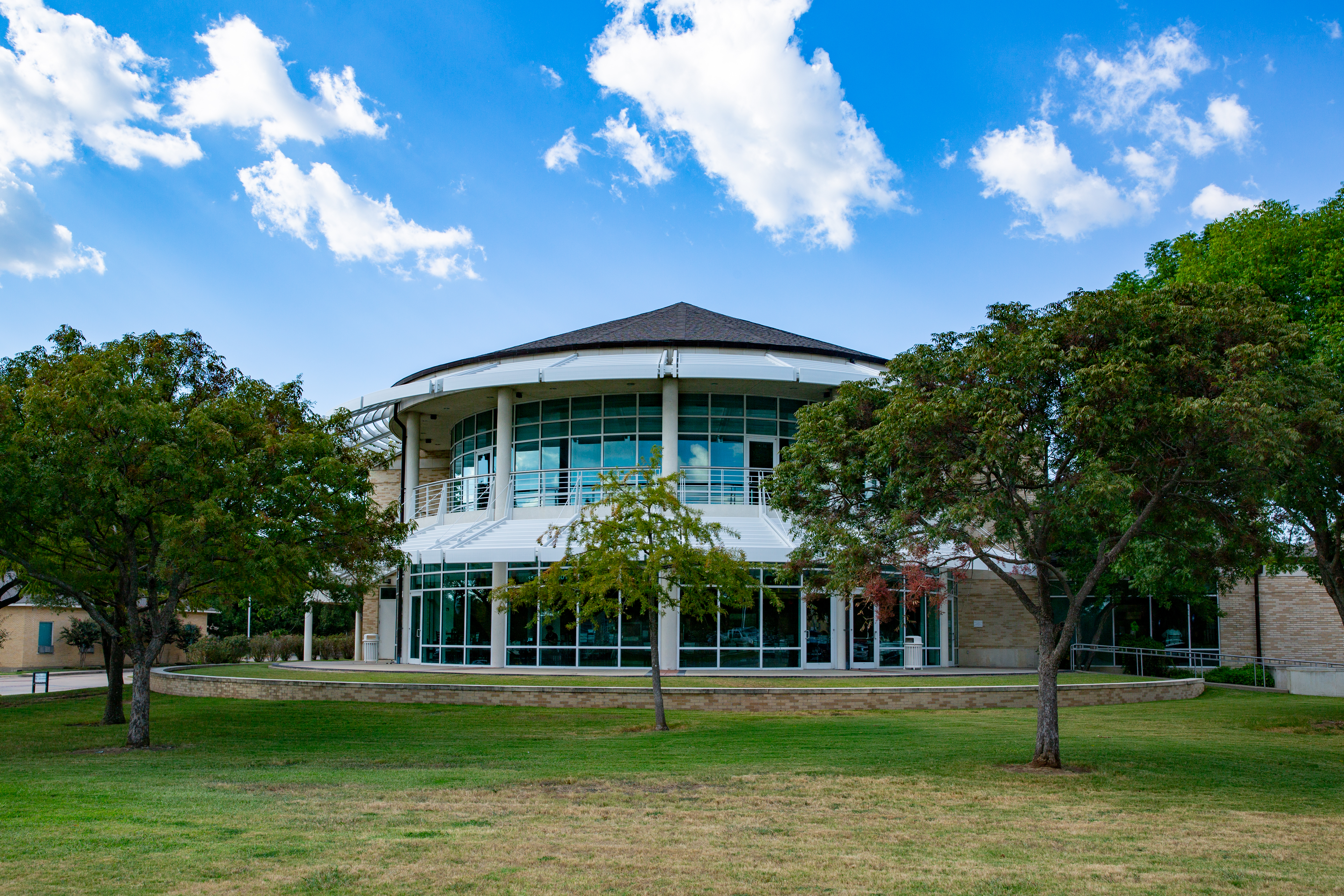
Wright Campus Center

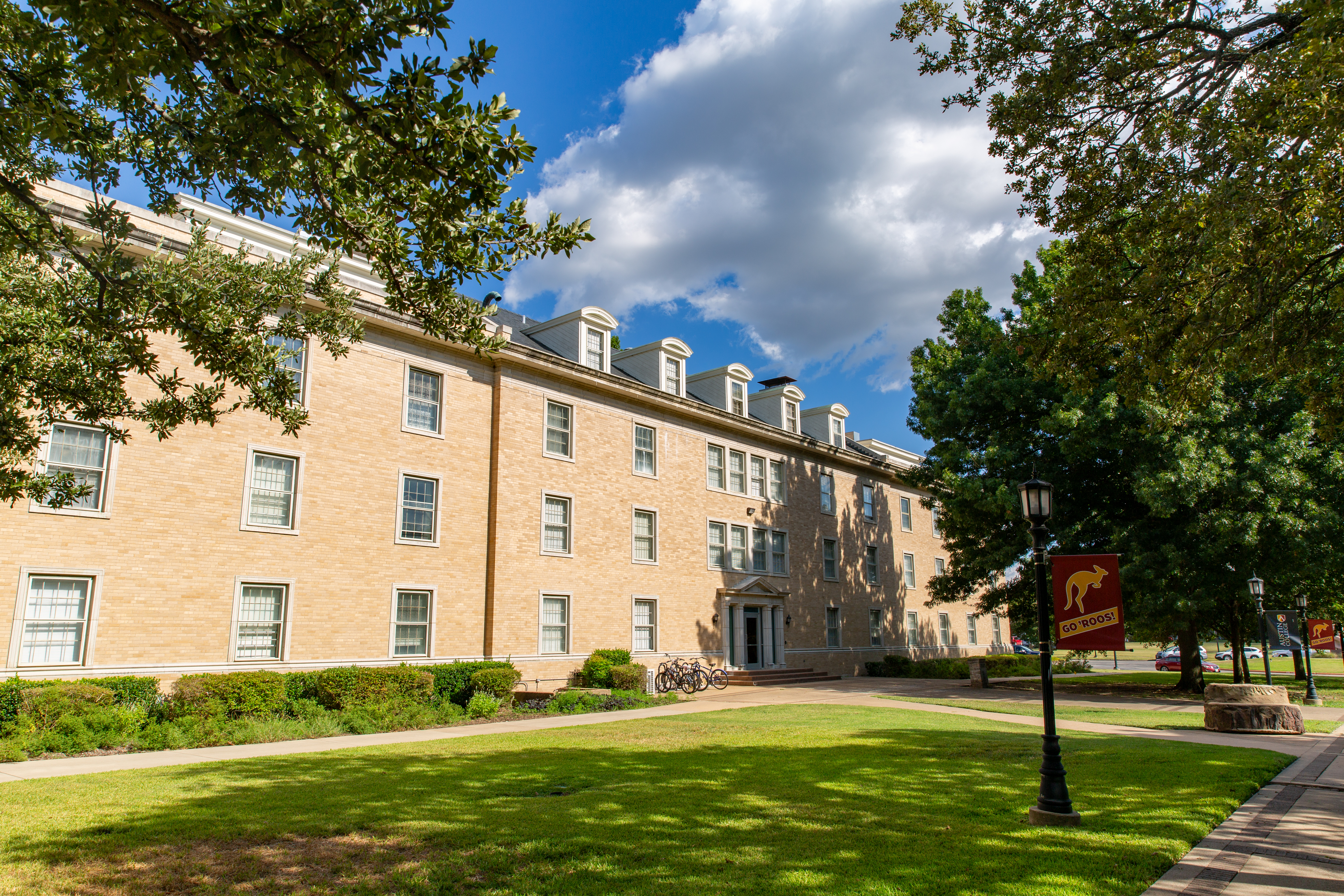
Clyce Residence Hall

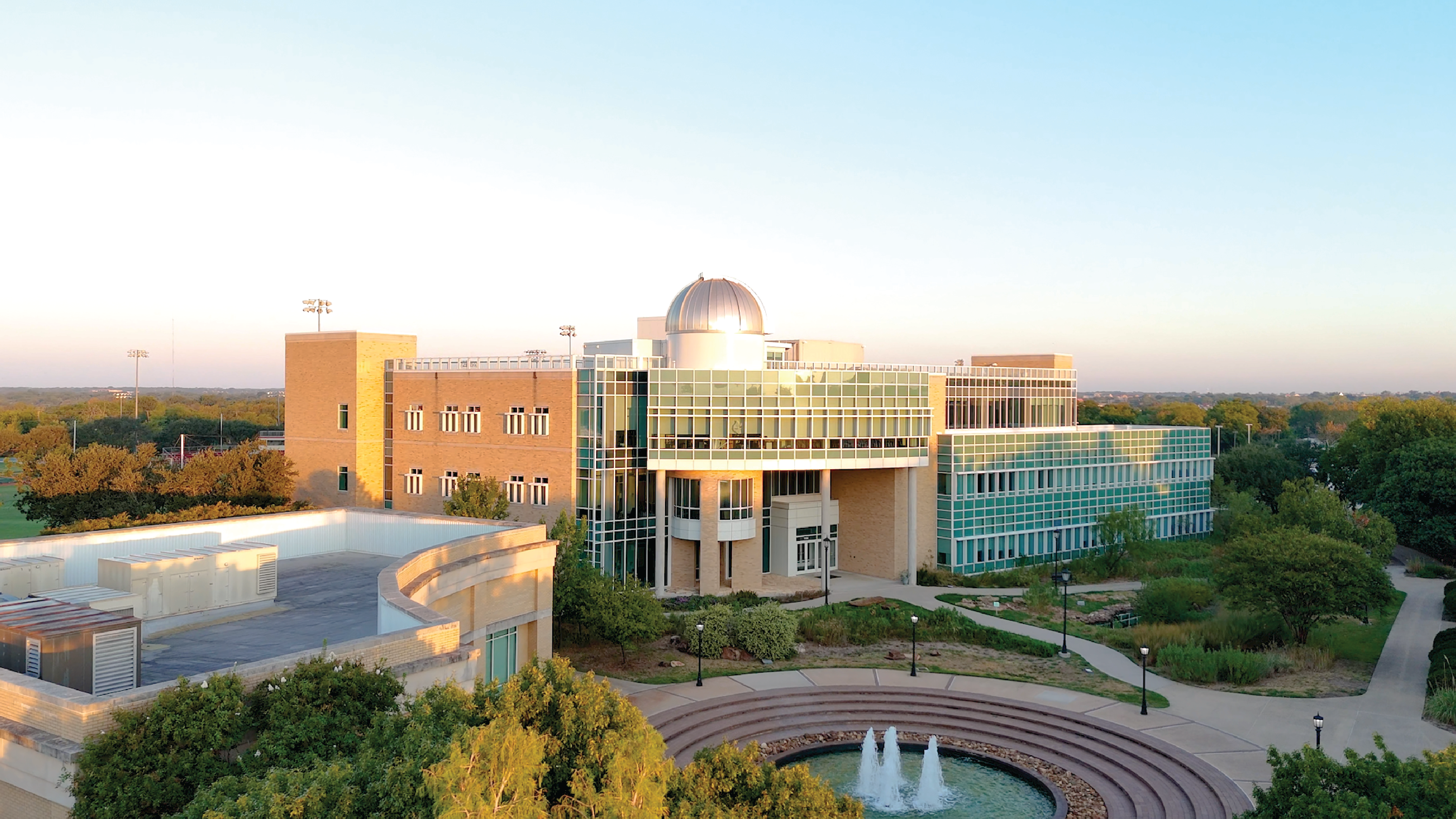
Idea Center and Jonsson Fountain

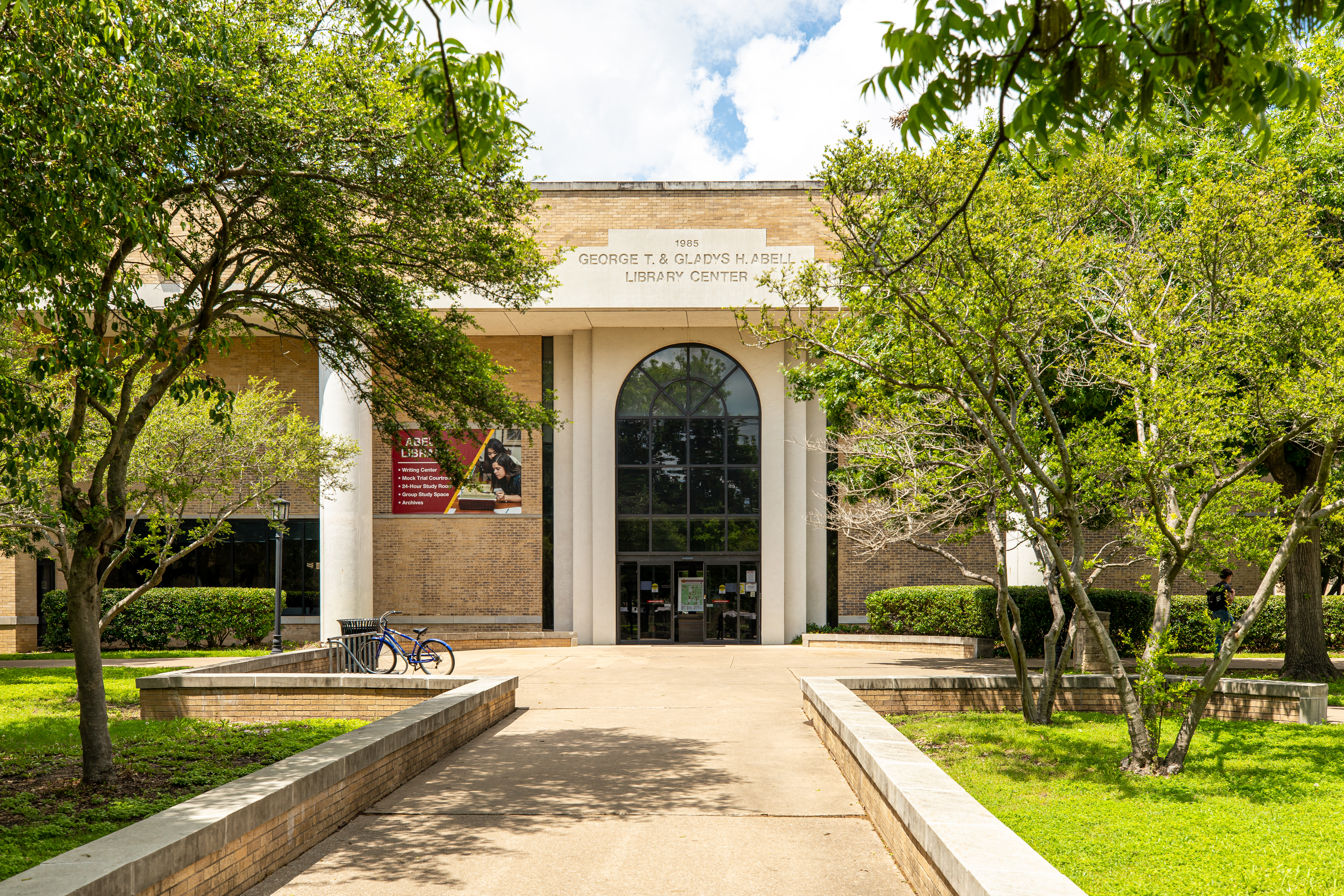
Abell Library

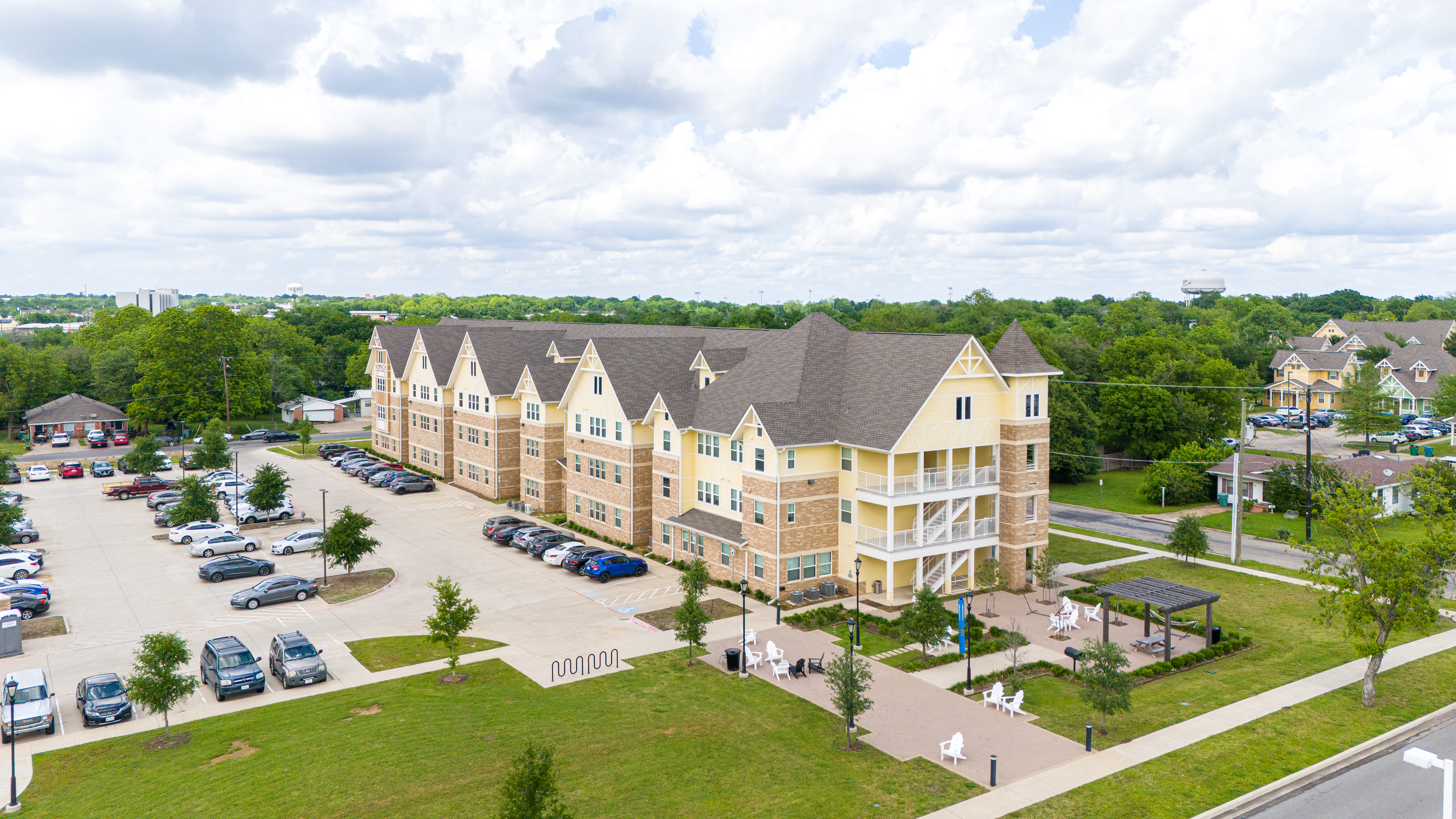
The North Flats

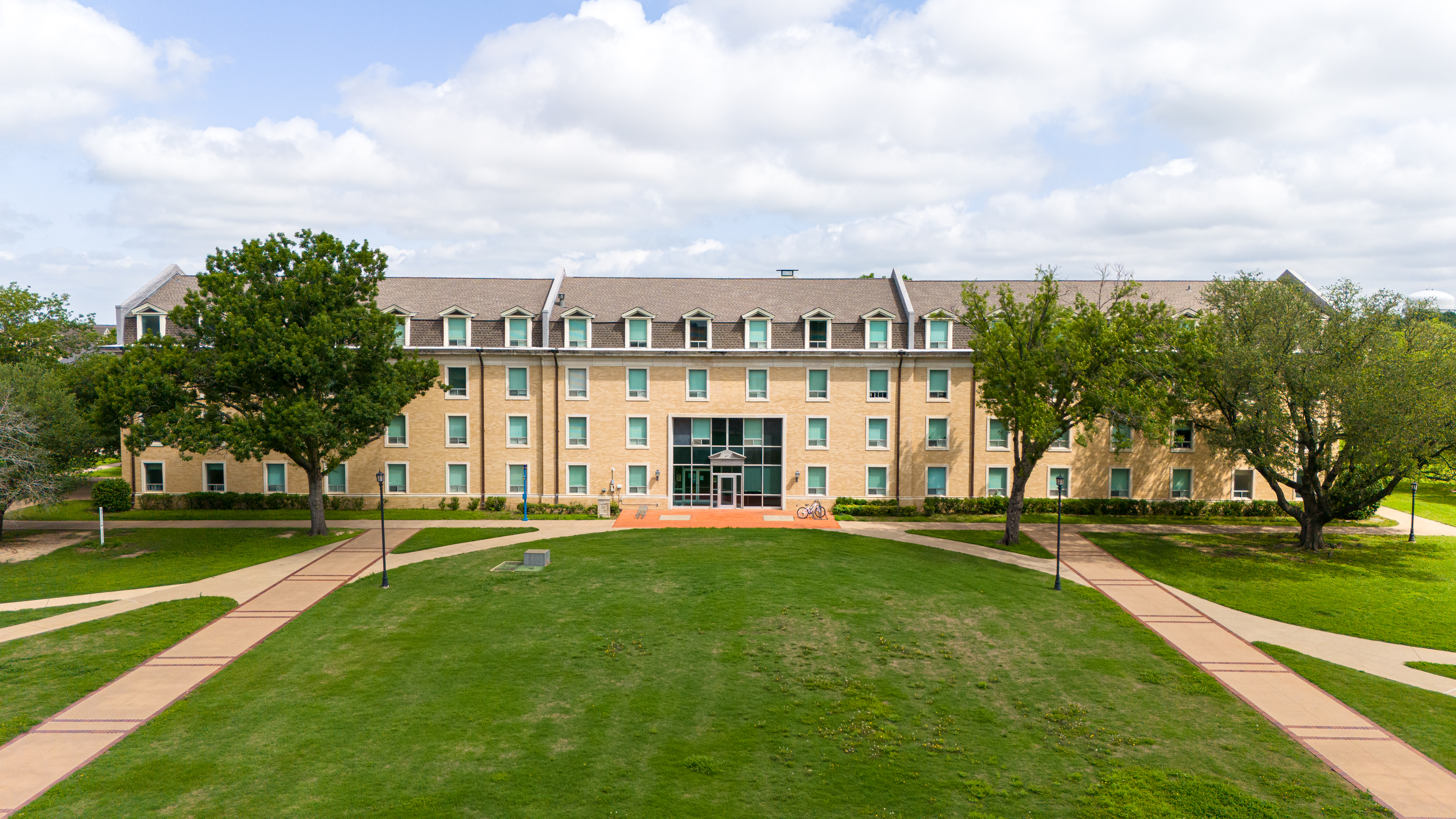
Dean Residence Hall

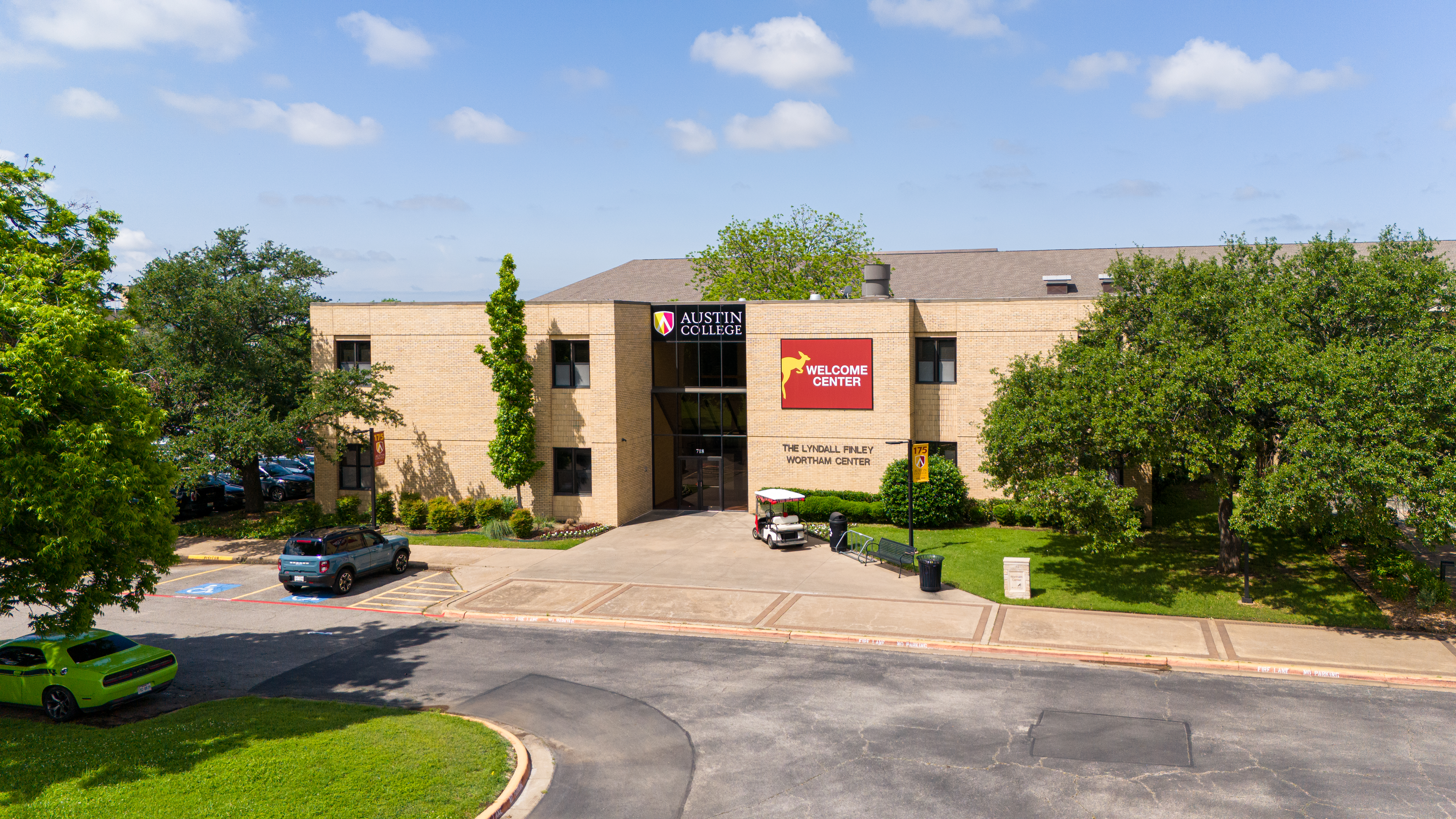
Lyndall Finley Wortham Center

== Athletics ==
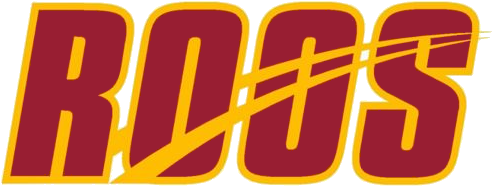
Austin athletics wordmark

Austin College joined the Southern Collegiate Athletic Conference (SCAC) on July 1, 2006, replacing Rose-Hulman Institute of Technology. The school was previously a member of the American Southwest Conference (ASC), Texas Intercollegiate Athletic Association, and Texas Conference. In 2017, the Austin College football team joined the Southern Athletic Association in football, while remaining a member of the SCAC across all other sports. In 2021, the football team rejoined the Southern Collegiate Athletic Conference (SCAC).

=== Baseball ===
In 2007, the first year of participating in the SCAC, the Austin College baseball team won the conference tournament, beating Millsaps College 9–7 in the finals. The Roos finished the season with a win–loss record of 22–25. The tournament win was the first ever conference championship for the Roos and the first time the program had ever been in the Regional tournament. Carl Iwasaki was the head coach for the Roos from 2005 until 2010. He won two coach of the year awards, the first in 2006 while the Roos were still in the ASC and the second, coming in 2007 after the Roos had joined the SCAC. Coach Iwasaki was replaced by James Rise for the 2011 season who coached for four seasons. Under Rise, the Roos went 11–24 in 2011, 8–29 in 2012, 12–29 in 2013, and 6–33 in 2014.

== Notable alumni ==
- Ramon Frederick Adams, author of books about the history of cattle and gunmen
- Ryan Allen, opera singer
- Marshall Applewhite, leader of the Heaven's Gate religious cult
- Gene Babb, football player
- Thomas Henry Ball, Texas politician
- Smith Ballew, actor and singer
- Billy Bookout, football player
- Hannibal Boone, 16th attorney general of Texas
- Byron Boston, football player
- John Bucy III, Texas House representative (2019–present)
- Ben Bumgarner, Texas House representative (2023–present)
- Joe Coomer, football player
- Deborah Crombie, author
- Philip Diehl, director of the United States Mint.
- Nancy Duff, theologian
- Larry Fedora, football coach
- Maurice Harper, football player
- David Lee "Tex" Hill, fighter pilot
- John Hitt, academic administrator
- Ron Kirk, former mayor of Dallas and former United States trade representative
- Candace Kita, actress
- Brandon McInnis, actor
- Haskell Monroe, educator and university administrator
- Ray Morehart, baseball player
- John Moseley, educator and college president
- Carroll Pickett, Presbyterian minister, author and advocate for abolishing the death penalty
- Homer Rainey, college president
- Charlie Robertson, baseball player
- Walter Rogers, U.S. representative
- Reggie Smith, Texas House representative (2018–2025)
- Dan Stoenescu, Romanian diplomat
- Leonidas Jefferson Storey, 13th lt. governor of Texas (1881–1883)
- Vern Sutton, operatic tenor
- Tom Thompson, football player
- Larry Tidwell, basketball coach

== Notable faculty ==
- Light Townsend Cummins, State Historian of Texas
- George Diggs, biologist
- Joseph Havel, artist, current director of the Glassell School of Art
- Jerry B. Lincecum, Texas folklore author
