= Avalon High School =

Location
- 104 FM 55; Avalon, Texas 76623; United States

Information
- School type: Public high school
- School district: Avalon Independent School District
- Principal: Khris Marshall
- Grades: PK-12
- Enrollment: 349 (2023-2024)
- Colors: Orange & White
- Athletics conference: UIL Class A
- Mascot: Eagle
- Website: Avalon High School

Avalon High School or Avalon School is a public high school located in the unincorporated community of Avalon, Texas, USA and classified as a 1A school by the UIL. It is a part of the Avalon Independent School District located in southeastern Ellis County. Avalon School was awarded National Blue Ribbon School status in 2014. In 2015, the school was rated "Met Standard" by the Texas Education Agency.

== Athletics ==
The Avalon Eagles compete in these sports -

Volleyball, Cross Country, 6-Man Football, Basketball, Track, Baseball & Softball
