= Reagor Springs =

Unincorporated community in Ellis County, Texas, United States

Coordinates: 32°19′49.3″N 96°45′35.8″W

Reagor Springs is an unincorporated community in Ellis County, Texas, United States.

== History ==
The first settlers arrived in 1844, and is believed to be named for John Reagor, a local pioneer.
