= Maypearl High School =

Public school in Texas, United States

Coordinates: 32.3151°N 97.0189°W

Location
- 600 Phillips St. Maypearl, Texas 76064-9801; United States

Information
- School type: Public High School
- Established: 1904
- School district: Maypearl Independent School District
- Principal: David James III
- Staff: 33.89 (FTE)
- Grades: 9-12
- Enrollment: 379 (2023–2024)
- Student to teacher ratio: 11.18
- Colors: Scarlet & White
- Athletics conference: UIL Class 3A
- Mascot: Panther
- Website: Maypearl High School

Maypearl High School is a public high school located in Maypearl, Texas (USA) and classified as a 3A school by the UIL. It is part of the Maypearl Independent School District located in west central Ellis County. In 2015, the school was rated "Met Standard" by the Texas Education Agency

History: Maypearl High School was established in 1904 in a 4 room school house on the western side of Claunch Street between Third and Fourth Street. This school not only served the community of Maypearl, but provided high school education to the nearby communities of Auburn, Bee Creek, Greathouse, Buena Vista, Oak Branch, Ozro, and Griffith, as these schools only taught up to 7th grade. In 1913, a new 8 classroom school building was built. This building was 2 and 1/2 stories, and had elementary on one level, high school on another, and an auditorium on top. The building had fallen into severe disrepair and was voted to be demolished in 1938. Through the WPA program, a new building was completed in 1939. High school classes were held on the northern side of the building through 1974, at which point elementary had moved out of the building, so junior high and high school could occupy full building. In 1976, middle school moved into the Quad, so high school occupied the WPA building. The tilt-wall high school was built in 1987. It featured 15 classrooms, 2 being science labs and 2 being home economics. It also had a commons area, gymnasium, and library, but not a true cafeteria or lunch line. These same blueprints were used to build to Grandview High School (now Grandview Junior High) in 1982. The commons area is now the legacy lounge, teacher work room, and a classroom. The gym was torn down and replaced in 1994 by the current one. This was because of foundation issues that have plagued the building since summer of 1987. The football stadium was also constructed in 1994, and an AG facility was built in 1997. In 1998 an addition was completed on the high school, which doubled the buildings size by adding a cafetorium, counseling office, 2 more science labs, a band hall, several classrooms and renovations to the library. In 2002, when the intermediate was built, 6th grade moved out of the campus. In 2007, a new AG facility was built, at which point the old facility was renovated into the field house. In 2010, 7th grade moved out of the campus, followed by 8th grade in 2012. There was discussion of constructing a fine arts building and new high school on the districts property across FM 157 around this time, but the 2008 recession had caused some issues with bonding capacity. In 2023, a bond passed to build a new front entry/office, cafetorium, and classrooms to the high school, as well as renovate the 1998 portion of the high school and vacate the 1987 side. This addition will be complete in August 2025.

== Athletics ==
The Maypearl Panthers compete in these sports -

Cross Country, Volleyball, Football, Basketball, Golf, Tennis, Track, Softball, and Baseball.

=== State Finalists ===
- Trombone player -
  - 1995(2A)
