= VISD =

VISD may refer to:

- Valentine Independent School District
- Van Independent School District
- Vega Independent School District
- Venus Independent School District
- Veribest Independent School District
- Vernon Independent School District
- Victoria Independent School District
- Vidor Independent School District
- Vysehrad Independent School District
