= Alsdorf, Texas =

Ghost town in Texas, US

Alsdorf
- Unincorporated community
- Location in Texas
- Coordinates: 32.4051418°N 96.5358216°W
- Country: United States
- State: Texas
- County: Ellis
- Elevation: 400 ft (122 m)

Alsdorf, formerly Faulkner, is a ghost town in Ellis County, Texas, United States. It was settled in the 1880s, with the construction of the Texas and New Orleans Railroad. The settlement was named Faulkner, for passenger agent Alsdorf Faulkner, being renamed to Alsdorf in 1895 with the arrival of a post office, which closed in 1920. At its peak in 1933, its population was 73; it was 49 in 1949, the last time its population was recorded.
