= Venus, Texas =

- City
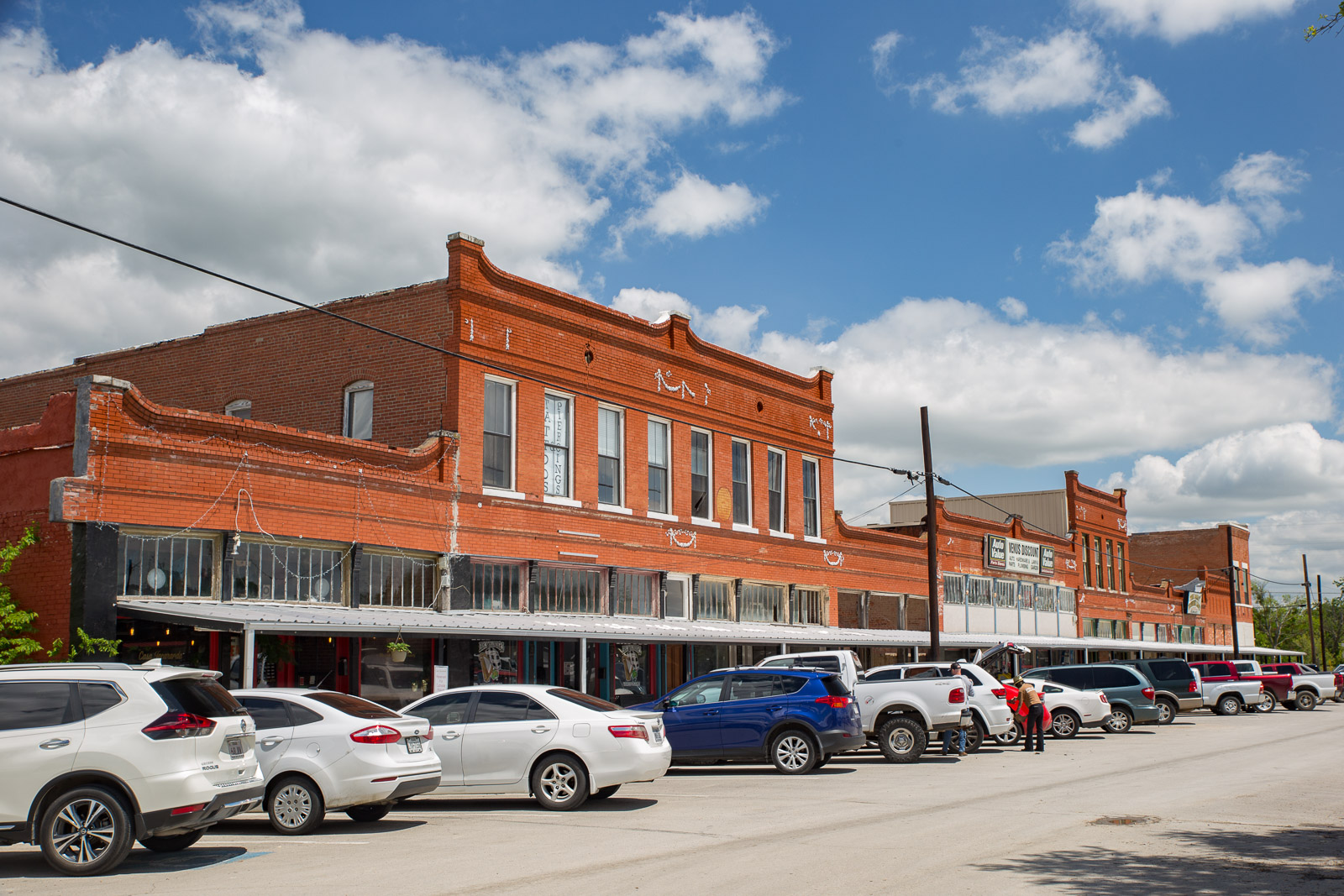
- Downtown, opposite Venus Square, West Second Street at South Walnut Street, Venus, Texas, 2017

- Location in Johnson County and the state of Texas
- Coordinates: 32°25′56″N 97°07′15″W
- Country: United States
- State: Texas
- Counties: Johnson, Ellis
- Incorporated (town): 1903

Area
  - Total: 3.10 sq mi (8.02 km^{2})
  - Land: 3.10 sq mi (8.02 km^{2})
  - Water: 0 sq mi (0.00 km^{2})
- Elevation: 673 ft (205 m)

Population (2020)
  - Total: 4,361
  - Estimate (2025): 8,870
  - Density: 1,410/sq mi (544/km^{2})
- Time zone: UTC-6 (Central (CST))
  - Summer (DST): UTC-5 (CDT)
- ZIP code: 76084
- Area codes: 214, 469, 945, 972
- FIPS code: 48-75236
- GNIS feature ID: 2413426
- Website: cityofvenus.org

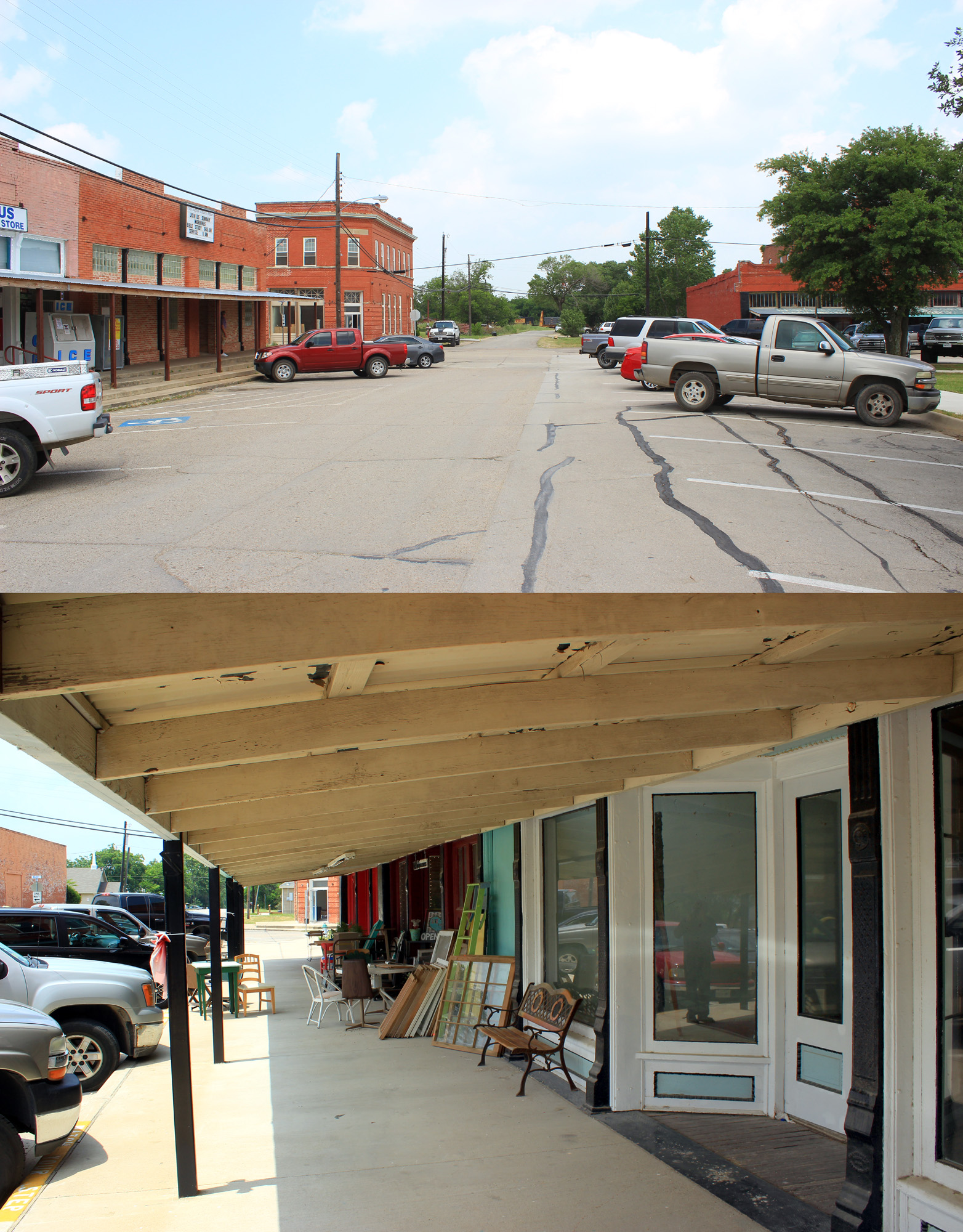
The Venus downtown business area, opposite Venus Square, West Second Street at South Walnut Street, was used as a filming location for the opening sequence, where Bonnie meets Clyde, of the movie Bonnie and Clyde, 1967

Venus is a city in Johnson and Ellis Counties in Texas. Its population was 4,361 in 2020.

== History ==
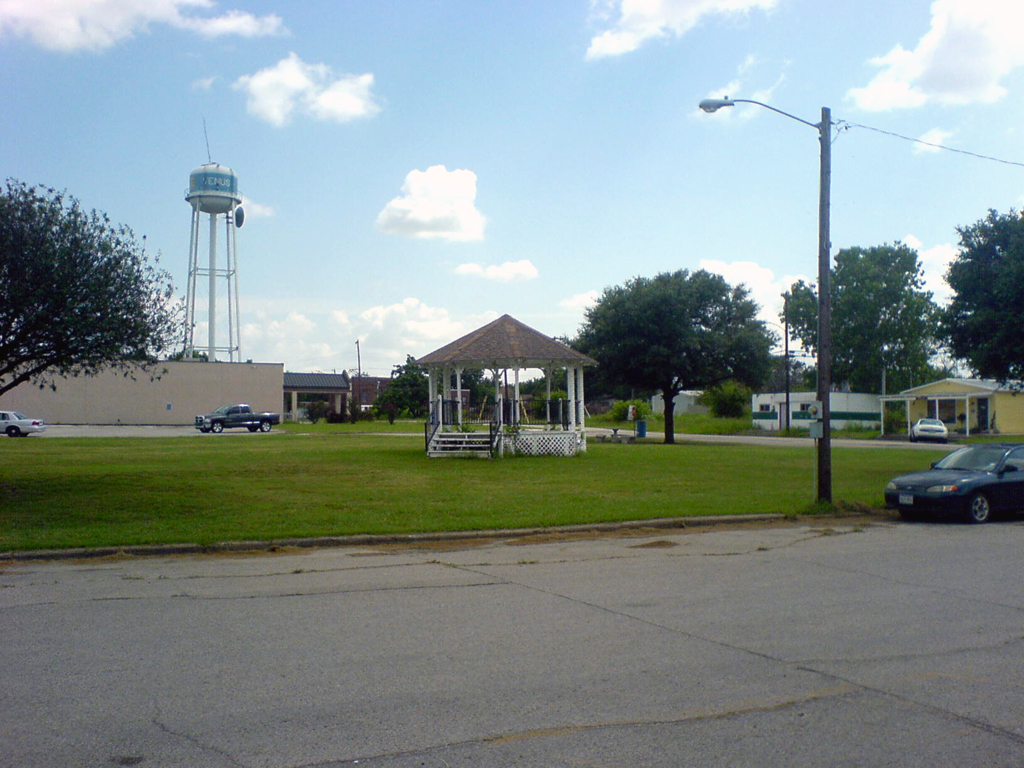
Venus Square, 2007

The town was originally named "Gossip" until its development in the late 1880s. J.C. Smythe purchased 80 acres (32 ha) of abandoned cornfields in the northeastern corner of Johnson County and began to plan a townsite. He named his new town "Venus" after the daughter of a local doctor. By 1888, the new town had a post office and a population around 10 residents. Being at the junction of two major railroads, Venus prospered and for a time was one of the fastest-growing communities in Johnson County. By the 1920s, Venus had its own schools (including a small college), several businesses, a weekly newspaper (the Venus Express), and a population that exceeded 800.

At its peak, it had two banks, two hardware stores, two dry-goods stores, two newspapers, two telephone systems, two barbershops, a post office, lumberyard, livery stable, blacksmith shops, and a first-class hotel.

The Great Depression had massive negative impact, however, and in the 1930s, the town began to decline. Growth of the Dallas–Fort Worth metroplex just to the north hastened its decline, with many of its residents relocating to the growing urban area in search of work. By 1940, its population had fallen to 200, and the only remaining operating business was the drug store.

Venus began to recover somewhat in the late 1940s, and the population soon increased back to over 300. Growth was slow but steady throughout the remainder of the 20th century; by 1990, 977 people lived there, and the town had spread into neighboring Ellis County. The 2000 census listed the population as 910, but the population more than tripled to 2,960 in 2010, due largely to the southward expansion of the DFW Metroplex.

== Geography ==
Venus is located in northeastern Johnson County. According to the United States Census Bureau, the town has a total area of 3.0 square miles (7.7 km^{2}), all land.

U.S. Route 67 passes through the town north of its center; the highway leads northeast 7.5 miles (12.1 km) to the center of Midlothian and west 7 miles (11 km) to Alvarado. Downtown Dallas and Fort Worth are each 31 miles (50 km) away, Dallas to the northeast and Fort Worth to the northwest.

=== Climate ===
The climate in this area is characterized by hot, humid summers and generally mild to cool winters. According to the Köppen climate classification, Venus has a humid subtropical climate, Cfa on climate maps.

Climate data for Venus, TX (1991-2020 normals)
Month	Jan	Feb	Mar	Apr	May	Jun	Jul	Aug	Sep	Oct	Nov	Dec	Year
Mean daily maximum °F (°C)	56.8 (13.8)	61.0 (16.1)	68.2 (20.1)	76.2 (24.6)	82.7 (28.2)	90.4 (32.4)	94.8 (34.9)	95.3 (35.2)	88.6 (31.4)	78.4 (25.8)	66.9 (19.4)	58.4 (14.7)	76.5 (24.7)
Daily mean °F (°C)	45.1 (7.3)	49.0 (9.4)	56.3 (13.5)	64.4 (18.0)	72.3 (22.4)	80.1 (26.7)	83.6 (28.7)	83.7 (28.7)	77.1 (25.1)	66.4 (19.1)	55.2 (12.9)	47.0 (8.3)	65.0 (18.3)
Mean daily minimum °F (°C)	33.3 (0.7)	37.1 (2.8)	44.5 (6.9)	52.5 (11.4)	61.9 (16.6)	69.9 (21.1)	72.5 (22.5)	72.2 (22.3)	65.7 (18.7)	54.4 (12.4)	43.5 (6.4)	35.5 (1.9)	53.6 (12.0)
Average precipitation inches (mm)	2.61 (66)	2.52 (64)	3.47 (88)	3.08 (78)	4.27 (108)	3.90 (99)	2.11 (54)	2.83 (72)	3.02 (77)	4.43 (113)	2.92 (74)	2.53 (64)	37.69 (957)
Average snowfall inches (cm)	0.3 (0.76)	0.3 (0.76)	0.0 (0.0)	0.0 (0.0)	0.0 (0.0)	0.0 (0.0)	0.0 (0.0)	0.0 (0.0)	0.0 (0.0)	0.0 (0.0)	0.0 (0.0)	0.2 (0.51)	0.8 (2.0)
Average precipitation days (≥ 0.01 in)	6.2	5.9	6.9	5.7	7.5	5.7	4.5	5.0	4.8	6.3	5.9	5.7	70.1
Average snowy days (≥ 0.1 in)	0.4	0.4	0.0	0.0	0.0	0.0	0.0	0.0	0.0	0.0	0.1	0.2	1.1
Source: NOAA

== Demographics ==
Historical population
Census	Pop.	Note	%±
1910	495		—
1920	842		70.1%
1930	570		−32.3%
1940	321		−43.7%
1950	357		11.2%
1960	324		−9.2%
1970	414		27.8%
1980	518		25.1%
1990	977		88.6%
2000	910		−6.9%
2010	2,960		225.3%
2020	4,361		47.3%
2025 (est.)	8,870	▲	103.4%
U.S. Decennial Census

=== 2020 census ===
As of the 2020 census, Venus had a population of 4,361, with 1,041 households, including 740 family households.

The median age was 32.8 years. About 24.1% of residents were under age 18, and 6.0% were age 65 or older. For every 100 females, there were 151.1 males; for every 100 females age 18 and over, there were 169.4 males age 18 and over.

About 0.0% of residents lived in urban areas, while 100.0% lived in rural areas.

Of the 1,041 households, 52.4% had children under the age of 18 living in them. Of all households, 58.0% were married-couple households, 10.8% were households with a male householder and no spouse or partner present, and 23.1% were households with a female householder and no spouse or partner present. About 13.8% of all households were made up of individuals, and 4.0% had someone living alone who was 65 years of age or older.

There were 1,085 housing units, of which 4.1% were vacant. The homeowner vacancy rate was 1.2%, and the rental vacancy rate was 7.6%.

Venus racial composition as of 2020 (NH = Non-Hispanic) (Note: Note: the US Census treats Hispanic/Latino as an ethnic category. This table excludes Latinos from the racial categories and assigns them to a separate category. Hispanics/Latinos can be of any race.)
Race	Number	Percentage
White (NH)	1,944	44.58%
Black or African American (NH)	803	18.41%
Native American or Alaska Native (NH)	8	0.18%
Asian (NH)	65	1.49%
Pacific Islander (NH)	3	0.07%
Some Other Race (NH)	24	0.55%
Multiracial (NH)	132	3.03%
Hispanic or Latino	1,382	31.69%
Total	4,361	

northeast corner of the Venus town square at West Second and South Walnut Streets

== Education ==
Venus is served by Venus Independent School District (www.venusisd.net), with kindergarten and first grade attending Venus Primary School, grades 2-5 attending Venus Elementary, grades 6–8 attending Venus Middle School, and grades 9–12 attending Venus High School. The small portion of Venus that lies in Ellis County is served by the Midlothian Independent School District or Maypearl Independent School District.

== Notable person ==
- Judith Barrett, actress in the 1930s
