= Waxahachie Creek =

Creek in northern Texas

Location
- Country: United States

Physical characteristics
- Mouth
  - location: Midlothian, Texas
  - coordinates: 32°29′24″N 96°59′55″W
- Length: 23 miles (37 km)

Waxahachie Creek is a creek in Ellis County, Texas. The creek rises in Midlothian and flows for 23 miles, running parallel with U.S. Highway 287 from Midlothian to Waxahachie. The creek skirts Lake Waxahachie, flowing under U.S. Highway 77 before flowing into Lake Bardwell near Ennis.

== History ==
Some of the earliest settlers of the area were the families of William Alden Hawkins and Larkin Newton, who moved to the area in 1848. For Hawkins to claim his 640 acres (260 ha) of land from the Peters Colony group, he was required to build a house on the property he chose along the mouth of Waxahachie Creek before July 1, 1848. The structure was built before the required deadline, and the land near the present-day Hawkins Spring went to the Hawkins family.

=== North and South Prong Creek ===
Two minor creeks flow into Waxahachie Creek, the North Prong Creek rises to the north-east of Midlothian, west of Ovilla. The creek passes U.S. Highway 287 before meeting the Waxahachie Creek. The South Prong Creek is a smaller creek connecting Lake Waxahachie to the creek.
