= Ike, Texas =

- Unincorporated community
- Location within Texas Location within the United States
- Coordinates: 32°24′14″N 96°46′13″W
- Country: United States
- State: Texas
- County: Ellis
- Elevation: 502 ft (153 m)
- Time zone: UTC-6 (Central (CST))
  - Summer (DST): UTC-5 (CDT)
- Area code: 972
- GNIS feature ID: 1378479

Ike is an unincorporated community in Ellis County, Texas, United States. The community is served by Farm to Market Road 878. The nearest city to Ike is Waxahachie.
