= South Prong Creek =

Creek in northern Texas

Location
- Country: United States

Physical characteristics
- Mouth
  - location: Midlothian, Texas
  - coordinates: 32°24′35″N 96°58′19″W

South Prong Creek is a creek in Ellis County, Texas. The creek rises south of Midlothian and flows east, running south of U.S. Highway 287 from Midlothian to Waxahachie. The creek then flows through the Scarborough Renaissance Festival grounds before meeting Lake Waxahachie at Interstate 35E.

== History ==
The creek is named after South Prong, a former community that was located beside the creek before the Lake Waxahachie was created.

== See also ==
- Waxahachie Creek
