= Lake Waxahachie =

Lake in Texas, United States

- Location within Texas Location within the United States
- Interactive map of Lake Waxahachie
- Location: Ellis County, Texas
- Coordinates: 32°20′27.02″N 96°49′27.4″W
- Type: Reservoir
- Primary inflows: Waxahachie Creek; South Prong Creek
- Basin countries: United States
- Managing agency: City of Waxahachie
- First flooded: 1956
- Surface area: 656 acres (265 ha)
- Average depth: 48 feet (15 m)
- Surface elevation: 532 feet (162 m)
- Settlements: Waxahachie, Texas
- References: U.S. Geological Survey Geographic Names Information System: Lake Waxahachie

Lake Waxahachie is a reservoir located south of Waxahachie, Texas. The reservoir is situated east of Interstate 35E.

Several creeks feed into the lake, including the Waxahachie Creek to the east and South Prong Creek to the west.
