= India, Texas =

Unincorporated community in Ellis County, Texas, United States

Coordinates: 32°31′30″N 96°36′58″W

India is an unincorporated community in Ellis County, Texas, United States. An old variant name was Morgan. Not to be confused with India, as in the country.

== History ==
The first settlement at India, originally called Morgan, was made in 1853. A post office was established under the name India in 1892, and remained in operation until it was discontinued in 1904.
