= Maypearl, Texas =

- City
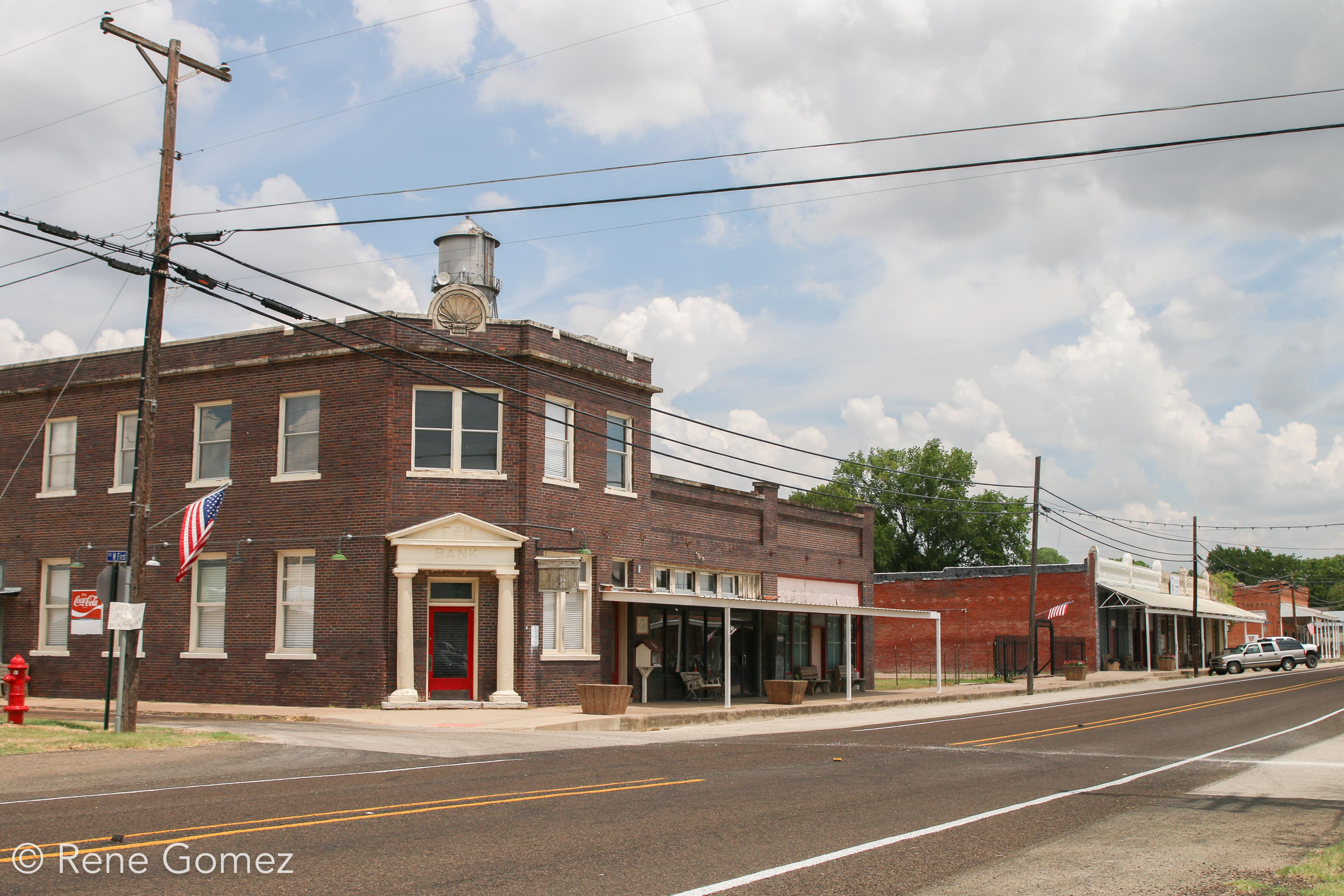
- A former bank in Maypearl
- Motto: "A pearl in the heart of North Texas"
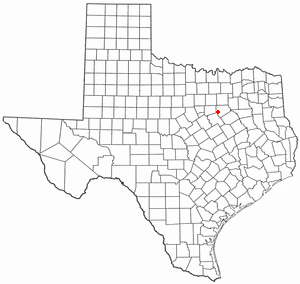
- Location of Maypearl, Texas

- Coordinates: 32°19′05″N 96°59′42″W
- Country: United States
- State: Texas
- County: Ellis
- Incorporated (city): 1911

Area
  - Total: 0.83 sq mi (2.14 km^{2})
  - Land: 0.81 sq mi (2.10 km^{2})
  - Water: 0.019 sq mi (0.05 km^{2})
- Elevation: 535 ft (163 m)

Population (2020)
  - Total: 939
  - Density: 1,160/sq mi (447/km^{2})
- Time zone: UTC-6 (Central (CST))
  - Summer (DST): UTC-5 (CDT)
- ZIP code: 76064
- Area codes: 214, 469, 945, 972
- FIPS code: 48-47268
- GNIS feature ID: 2411053
- Website: cityofmaypearl.org

Maypearl is a city in Ellis County, Texas, United States. Its population was 939 in 2020.

== Geography ==
Maypearl is located in western Ellis County and is 11 miles (18 km) southwest of Waxahachie, the county seat, 13 miles (21 km) south of Midlothian, and 39 miles (63 km) southwest of downtown Dallas.

According to the United States Census Bureau, Maypearl has a total area of 0.81 square miles (2.1 km^{2}), of which 0.02 square miles (0.05 km^{2}), or 2.16%, is covered by water.

The climate in this area is characterized by hot, humid summers and generally mild to cool winters. According to the Köppen climate classification, Maypearl has a humid subtropical climate, Cfa on climate maps.

== Demographics ==
Historical population
Census	Pop.	Note	%±
1920	417		—
1930	410		−1.7%
1940	377		−8.0%
1950	373		−1.1%
1960	359		−3.8%
1970	462		28.7%
1980	626		35.5%
1990	781		24.8%
2000	746		−4.5%
2010	934		25.2%
2020	939		0.5%
U.S. Decennial Census

=== 2020 census ===
As of the 2020 census, Maypearl had a population of 939 people. There were 248 families residing in the city. The median age was 32.3 years, with 28.3% of residents under the age of 18 and 11.4% of residents 65 years of age or older; for every 100 females there were 108.2 males, and for every 100 females age 18 and over there were 106.4 males age 18 and over.

There were 297 households in Maypearl, of which 49.8% had children under the age of 18 living in them. Of all households, 59.6% were married-couple households, 15.8% were households with a male householder and no spouse or partner present, and 20.9% were households with a female householder and no spouse or partner present. About 12.8% of all households were made up of individuals and 6.8% had someone living alone who was 65 years of age or older.

There were 317 housing units, of which 6.3% were vacant. The homeowner vacancy rate was 4.2% and the rental vacancy rate was 2.5%.

0.0% of residents lived in urban areas, while 100.0% lived in rural areas.

Racial composition as of the 2020 census
Race	Number	Percent
White	665	70.8%
Black or African American	53	5.6%
American Indian and Alaska Native	15	1.6%
Asian	13	1.4%
Native Hawaiian and Other Pacific Islander	0	0.0%
Some other race	48	5.1%
Two or more races	145	15.4%
Hispanic or Latino (of any race)	202	21.5%

== Education ==
The community is served by the Maypearl Independent School District and is home to the Maypearl High School Panthers. The district received a recognized status by the Texas Education Agency for the 2009–2010 academic year
