= Lake Bardwell =

- Trinity River Basin
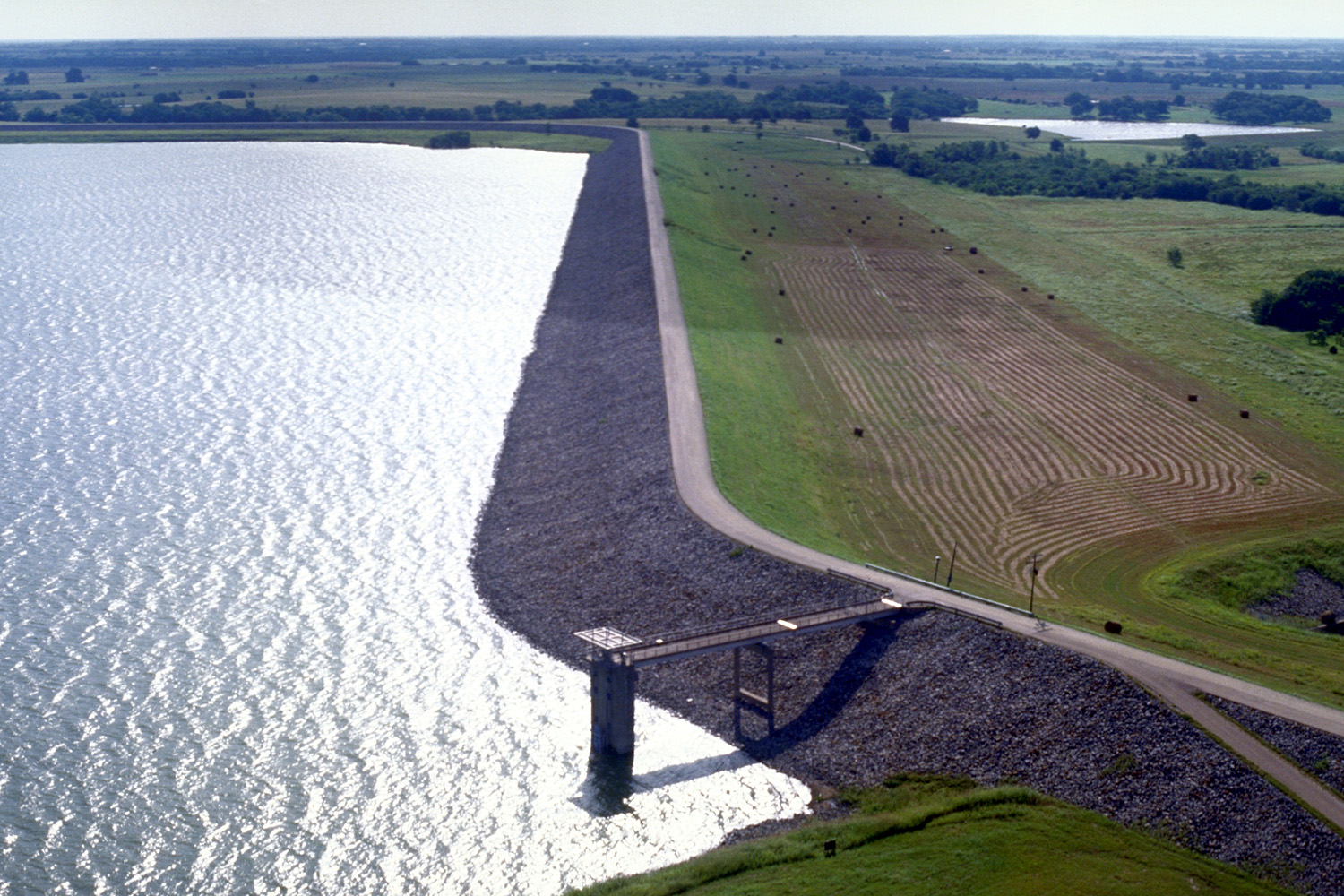
- USACE Lake Bardwell and Dam

- Location within Texas

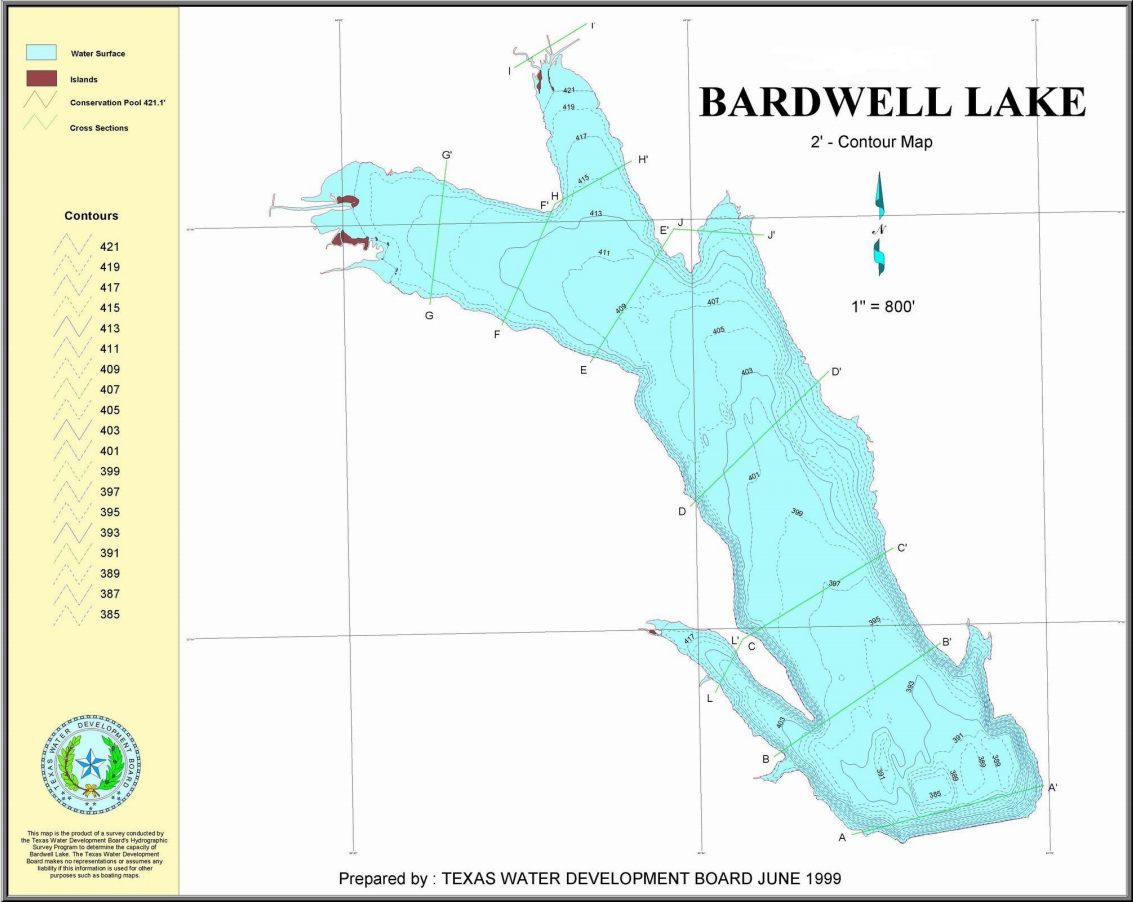
- Location: Ellis County, Texas, United States of America
- Coordinates: 32.278°N 96.658°W
- Type: reservoir
- Primary inflows: Waxahachie Creek
- Primary outflows: Waxahachie Creek
- Basin countries: United States
- Managing agency: US Army Corps of Engineers
- Built: September, 1963
- First flooded: 01/01/1965
- Max. length: 5.4 miles (8.7 km)
- Max. width: 1.2 miles (1.9 km)
- Surface area: 3,570 acres (1,440 ha)
- Max. depth: 36 ft (11 m)
- Water volume: 140,000 acre⋅ft (0.17 km^{3})
- Shore length^{1}: 25 miles (40 km)
- Surface elevation: 421 feet (128 m)
- Settlements: Ennis and Bardwell
- References: https://tshaonline.org/handbook/online/articles/rob02
- ^{1} Shore length is not a well-defined measure.

Lake Bardwell is a lake in Ellis County, Texas. The lake was constructed by the United States Army Corps of Engineers in 1965. Lake Bardwell is not used for military operations, and is accessible to the public for recreational purposes; it has seven facilities, but the state public ramp is closed.

== Description ==
Lake Bardwell, located completely within Ellis County, is about 45 miles south of Dallas, 10 miles southeast of Waxahachie, and 5 miles south of Ennis. It is located in southeastern Ellis County, with the city of Bardwell due west of the lake. Lake Bardwell is roughly 5.4 miles long and 1.2 miles wide at its widest point, and has a shoreline of 25 miles. Highway 34 passes over the lake, and it is mostly surrounded by forest and farms that use the lake's water. Lake Bardwell is part of the flood control and allied purposes construction project for the Trinity River Basin and Trinity Project Office. Lake construction was completed by the United States Army Corps of Engineers in November 1965 and was created for municipal water supply, flood control, and recreation.

Lake Bardwell was built in a moderately humid climate zone that receives about 32-36 inches of rainfall and the lake has an average temperature of 64.8 °F (18.2 °C), with the warmest month on average being July, and the coolest being January.

The contact number for park staff is: (972) 875-5711.

There are pieces of an old flooded bridge sticking out of the water at the north of the lake. This used to be a bridge across the lake connecting Old Waxahachie Road to Ennis Parkway.

== History ==
Authorization to start the construction of Lake Bardwell was given under the Flood Control Act of March 31, 1960, with construction of the lake beginning in September, 1963. Impoundment of the lake began in November 1965. The total construction cost was $12,630,000.

Lake Bardwell was built to provide flood control and water conservation for surrounding towns, and it receives runoff from 178 square miles of drainage. It has a capacity of about 326,000 gallons, and a flood-control pool that allows the lake to prevent flood damage to surrounding towns and wildlife areas by only letting out as much water as creeks downstream can support.

Although not a primary reason for the production of the lake, the U.S. Army Corps of Engineers allows recreation in the lake, due to recreation being a major component of the U.S. Army Corps of Engineers multiple-use approach to managing the nation's resources.

=== Military involvement ===
The U.S. Army Corps of Engineers has not used Lake Bardwell for any military operations, and has allowed the lake to be used for recreational purposes. Lake Bardwell is also used to manage the wetland area around it. Buffalo Creek Wetland (found on the south side of the lake) resulted from a combined effort from the Department of Energy and the U.S. Army Corps of Engineers to offset the destruction of wetlands during the construction of the Superconducting Super Collider.

The construction of Lake Bardwell has protected surrounding cities and grasslands from potential floods. The Secretary of the Army approved a contract on Jun 24th, 1963, allowing the Trinity River Authority to use 25% of the lake's conservation storage space as water supply for the city of Ennis. This agreement was later supplemented in October 1969, allowing 60% of the water conservation pool to be allocated to Ennis, and 40% to Waxahachie. This agreement has allowed both Ennis and Waxahachie's economies to be primarily based on agriculture and agribusiness.

=== Coronavirus ===
On April 16, 2020, all recreation areas, including multiuse trails, of Lake Bardwell were closed due to COVID-19.

== Activities and facilities ==
=== Recreation area facilities ===
Lake Bardwell opens to the public at 6:00 am and closes at 10:00 pm, visitors leaving after 10:00 are not allowed to re-enter with a vehicle, but may park outside and walk back to their site.

The status of the facilities at Lake Bardwell is:

Facility status
Facility	Status	Closure type	Type of facility	Restrooms	ADA-accessible	Parking	Courtesy docks	Boat gas	Picnic areas	Camping
Love Park	Partially closed	Construction	Park	X		X	X		X	
State Public Ramp	Fully closed	N/A	N/A							
Little Mustang Creek	Partially closed	Other	Park	X		X	X		X	
Waxahachie Creek Park	N/A	Seasonal	Park		X	X	X		X	X
High View Park	Partially closed	Other	Park	X		X	X	X (High View Marina)	X	X
Mott Park	N/A	Seasonal	Park	X		X	X		X	X
Overlook Park	Fully open	N/A	Park							
Buffalo Creek wetlands	Fully open	N/A	Access point							

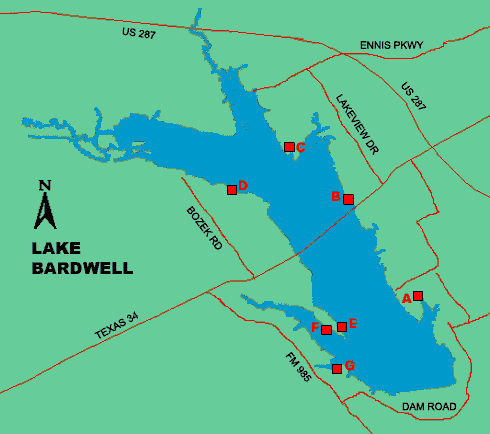
Lake Bardwell location

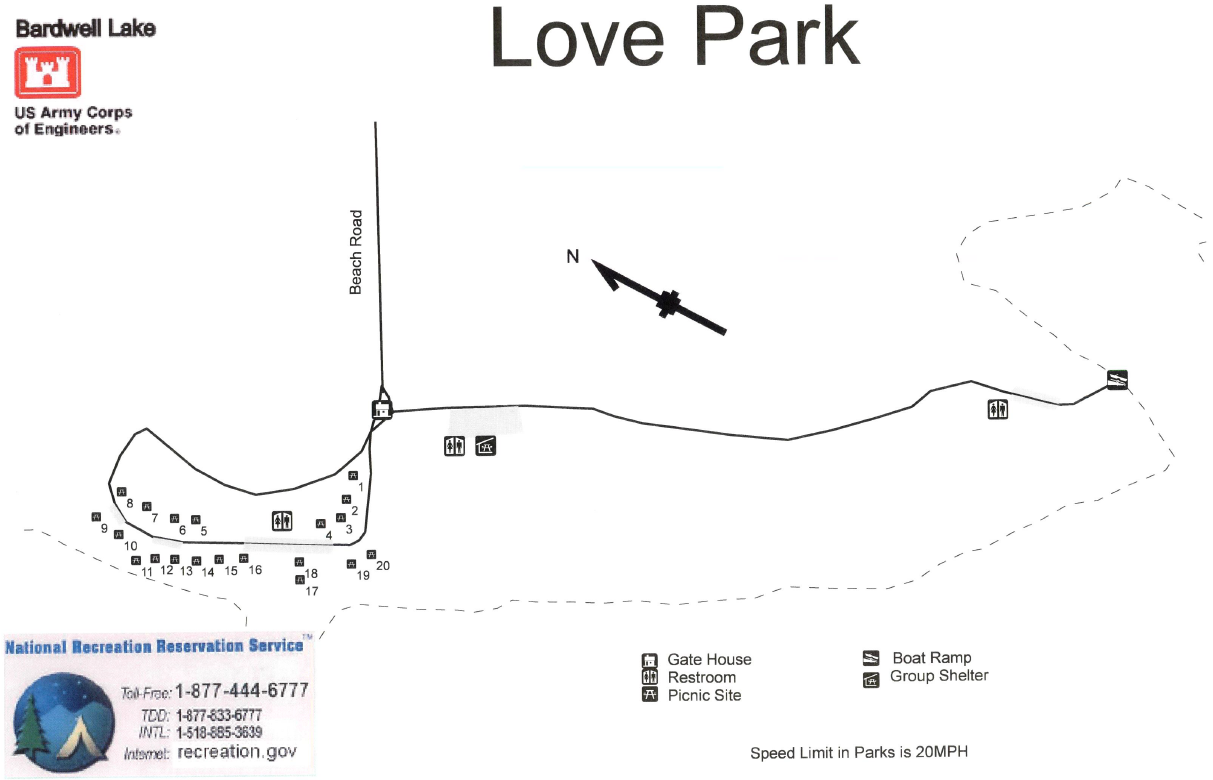
A U.S. Army Corps of Engineers created map of Love Park

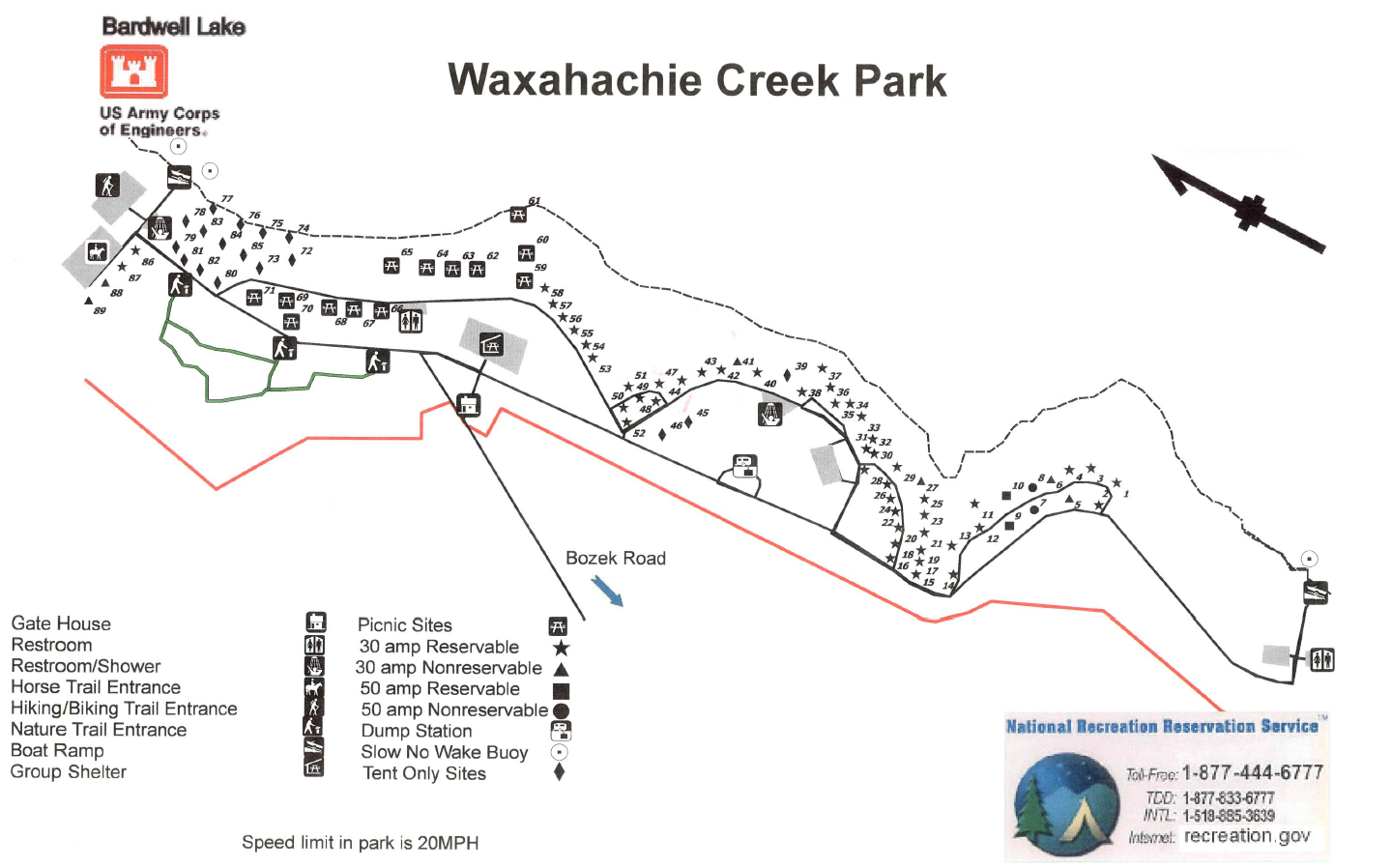
A U.S. Army Corps of Engineers-created map of Waxahachie Creek Park

All parks have an area usage fee of $5.00 per vehicle to cover expenses for the facilities and amenities. The marina located in High View Park has a separate charge for use of its facilities. Visitors to campers have no charge imposed on them. The below list is labelled in reference to the image of the lake to the right.

Love park: (A)

- Located on the southeastern shore of the lake
- 20 covered picnic tables
- Four-lane boat ramp with parking for 20 vehicles
- One volleyball court
- Pedestrian lake access
- Open all year
- Advance shelter reservations are available through the National Recreation Reservation Service

State Public Ramp: (B)

- Closed

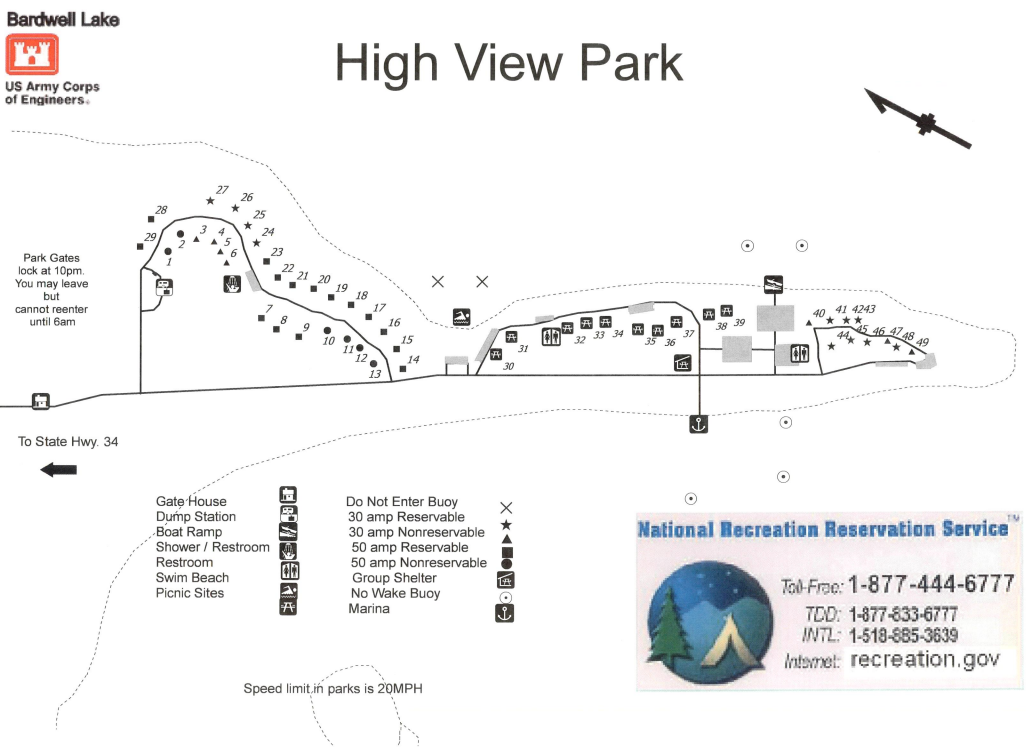
A U.S. Army Corps of Engineers created map of High View Park

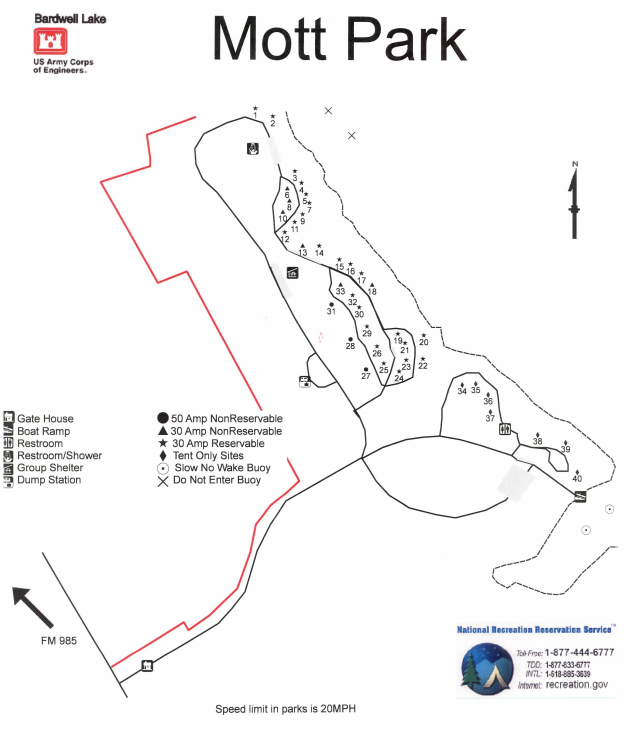
A U.S. Army Corps of Engineers created map of Mott Park

Little Mustang Creek Park: (C)

- Located in the northern reaches of the lake
- Four-lane boat ramp with parking for 20 vehicles
- Open all year

Waxahachie Creek Park: (D)

- Located in the upper reaches of the lake along the Waxahachie Creek arm of the lake
- 69 campsites with water and electric hook-ups and 7 campsites without hook-ups
- 13 picnic sites
- 4 vault toilets and 2 shower facilities
- 1 nature trail
- 1 group camping shelter, this shelter can accommodate 8 recreational vehicles and up to 200 people
- Two 4-lane boat ramps with parking for 40 vehicles
- Open all year
- Is approximately 205 acres, with development on 63 acres

High View Park & Marina: (E and F)

- Located on the west side of the lake
- 39 Campsites with water and electric hook-ups
- 1 Vault toilet and 2 waterborne restrooms with showers
- 1 swim beach
- 10 picnic sites and 3 covered benches
- Four-lane boat ramp with parking for 20 vehicles
- 1 full service marina
- Open all year
- Park entry fee and separate boat-launch fee required
- Around 155 acres, with development on 84 acres

Mott Park: (G)

- Located on the west side of the lake
- 33 campsites with water and electric hook-ups and 7 campsites without hook-ups
- 1 vault toilet and 1 waterborne restroom with showers
- Four-lane boat ramp with parking for 20 vehicles
- 1 courtesy dock
- 1 group camping shelter
- 2 designated fishing areas
- 1 swim beach with 3 covered benches
- Open all year
- Around 270 acres

Meadow View Nature Area:

- Located on the northeastern shore of the lake
- 20 covered picnic tables

=== Camping ===
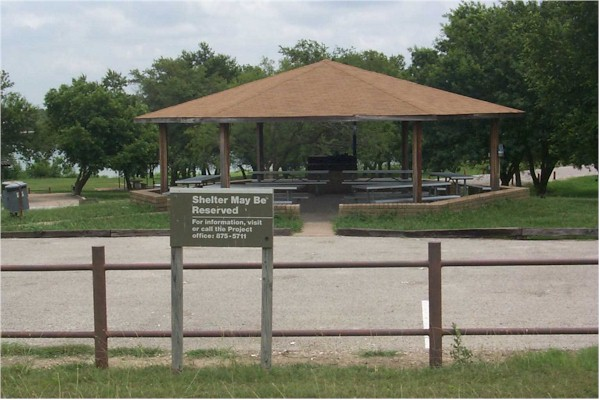
The venue for hire when going group camping in Mott Park at Lake Bardwell

Lake Bardwell offers 2 forms of camping; group camping, and developed camping.

A permit is required for events or activities that occur at the park. This includes but is not limited to bounce houses, water slides, weddings, tournaments, bands, DJs, church function, etc. Swimming pools are not allowed no matter the size.

==== Group camping ====
At Lake Bardwell, Mott Park and Waxahachie Creek Park offer group camping services.

The shelters are available for reservations, with reservations beginning at 10:00 am and ending at 9:00 am the next day.

Mott Park:

- 6 picnic tables
- A barbecue grill
- 4 hookups for recreational vehicles or camping trailers
- 27 parking spaces available
- The shelter accommodates 100 visitors for a daily rate of $80.

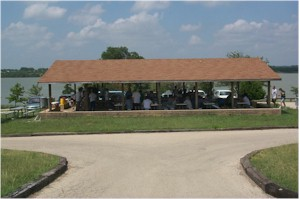
The venue for hire when going group camping in Waxahachie Creek Park at Lake Bardwell

Waxahachie Creek Park:

- Covered shelter
- 12 picnic tables
- A barbecue grill
- 8 hookups for recreational vehicles or camping trailers
- 66 parking spaces available
- The shelter accommodates 200 visitors for a daily rate of $120.

==== Developed camping ====
Lake Bardwell has three parks that offer developed camping: High View Park, Mott Park, and Waxahachie Creek Park.

=== Fishing ===
The fishing regulations for Lake Bardwell are managed under statewide regulations. Hybrids are stocked annually.

Crappie are usually caught at either the Highview Marina, under the Highway 34 bridge, or in Waxahachie and Mustang Creeks during spawning.

The different types of fish found in Lake Bardwell and the quantity of fish are:

Quantity of fish in the lake
Species	Poor	Fair	Good	Excellent	Preferred bait
Largemouth bass		X			
Catfish			X		Live
Crappie			X		Live
White bass				X	Noisemaking lures
Hybrid striped bass			X		Noisemaking lures
Sunfish	X				

The largest bass caught at a Texas lake was caught using a McDonald's chicken McNugget. The Highview Marina declared it the biggest fish caught at Lake Bardwell, stating it weighed 10.802 lb, and was 24 and 1/2 inches long. The couple who caught the bass tossed it back into the lake after reviewing it.

Fears arose of an invasive species of mussel spreading into Ellis County by infected boats going fishing in the lake, but no confirmation has been found that the zebra mussel has made its way into Lake Bardwell.

==== Deaths ====
On December 17, 2018, authorities pronounced two men deceased at 2:50 pm. They were identified as Richard Ly, 61, and Van Cao, 47, both from Arlington. The Dallas County medical examiner's office stated that the cause of death was an accidental drowning while on a fishing trip. A local grocery store worker noticed that the two regulars anglers did not come by the store that Monday night, and called law enforcement. Game warden Jeff Powell and the sheriff's deputy went to the lake on the morning of December 16, and were called by a resident who said he spotted something in the water. After confirming that the two individuals were in the water, drone footage showed that the bodies were 200 yards apart and that neither of the individuals were wearing a life jacket. Powell stated he found no indication of foul play, and that it "looks like a tragic accident".

=== Birdwatching ===
Birdwatching is a pastime for many of the visitors at Lake Bardwell.

=== Trails ===
The Bardwell Equestrian and Multiuse Trail

A U.S. Army Corps of Engineers created map of Tonkawa Trail

The Bardwell Equestrian and Multiuse trail is over 13 miles; visitors can hike, bike, or ride horses on it. The trail provides a round trip of about 26 miles. Trail etiquette gives equestrians the right of way. The lake offers a flat main trail, with numerous loops into surrounding meadows, croplands, and bottomland hardwood forest along Waxahachie Creek. The trail is within the designated hunting area surrounding the lake.

The trail head offers:

- An informational bulletin board
- A secure trailer length parking lot with hitching posts
- Equestrian campsites
- Water hook ups
- A horse barn with two designated stalls per site
- Trail maps are available at the gate house.

The Tonkawa Trail (Buffalo Creek Wetland Trail) is almost a mile long, and provides access to the various components of Buffalo Creek Wetland. The ground is firm due to a 4- to 6-inch layer of crushed granite. Four observation shelters along the trail provide an opportunity to observe some of the plants or animals that live in the Buffalo Creek Wetlands.

The Waxahachie Trail is a dense upper canopy of bottomland hardwood trees, which covers most of the journey. Visitors hiking this trail can see the three layers of forest vegetation.

=== Other activities ===
==== Boating ====
Boat Ramp Information
Boat ramp name	Ramp location	Agency	Fee	Season
Love Park	Beach Rd.	USACE	$4.00	Apr 1-Sep 30
High View Park	262 High View Rd.	USACE	$4.00	All year
Little Mustang Creek	Lane View Rd	USACE	Free	All year
Mott Park	957 FM 985	USACE	$4.00	Apr 1-Sep 30
Waxahachie Creek Park	930 Bozek	USACE	$4.00	Apr 1-Sep 30

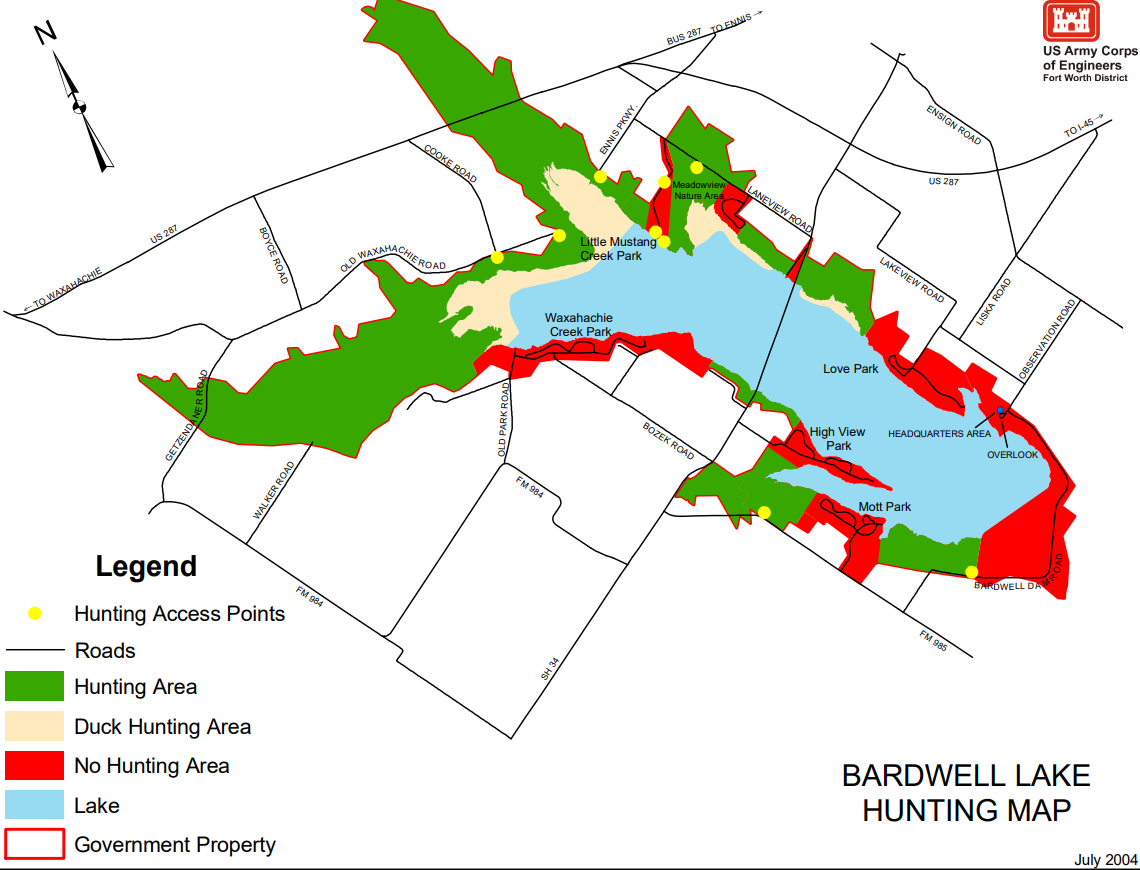
Hunting map of Lake Bardwell

==== Hunting ====
A permit is not needed to go hunting at Lake Bardwell. Lake Bardwell's hunting ground covers 2,528 acres.

The hunting program for Lake Bardwell is managed by the Fort Worth District of the U.S. Army Corps of Engineers, who work with Texas Parks and Wildlife Department and several other entities to provide hunting opportunities.

==== Swimming ====
Lake Bardwell has two developed swim beaches. Neither of these beaches has lifeguards provided. Pets, grills, and glass containers are prohibited in the designated swim beach area.

High View Park:

- The beach is around 300 ft long and 100 ft wide.
- A vault-type restroom and asphalt parking areas are close to the swimming area.
- A $4.00 per vehicle area use fee or valid annual pass is required to use the beach.

Mott Park:

- The beach is about 300 ft long and 100 ft wide.
- A waterborne-type restroom with showers and asphalt parking areas are close to the swimming area.
- A $4.00 per vehicle area use fee or valid annual pass is required to use the beach.

== Wildlife ==
=== Flora ===
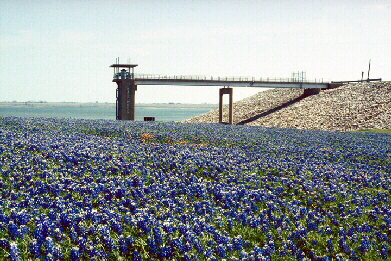
Meadow View Nature Area with bluebonnets in the foreground

Bluebonnets can be found in the Meadow View Nature Area.

Hydrilla can be found north of the Highway 34 Bridge.

=== Fauna ===
Many species of birds visit the lake, such as ducks, herons, egrets, songbirds, hawks, and cormorants. Lake Bardwell is a link in the chain of lakes that whooping cranes use for their migration. The whooping cranes stop 15 to 20 times on their 2,500-mile migration every year to rest and feed, but due to most of Lake Bardwells' shore area being developed for recreational use, the cranes have trouble roosting, as they normally roost in water with a depth of 2 to 10 inches.

In the Buffalo Creek Wetland, ponds contain frogs and crayfish, which often are stalked by great blue herons and great egrets. In the woods section of the Buffalo Creek Wetland trail, visitors may find many woodland species such as downy and red-bellied woodpeckers and barred owls.
Lake Bardwells' fish are stocked to ensure anglers have enough opportunities, while also ensuring that the lake's ecosystem survives. Sunfish (green x red-ear), catfish (channel, blue), and bass (sunshine, striped, palmetto, largemouth, Florida largemouth) are stocked.

== Gallery ==
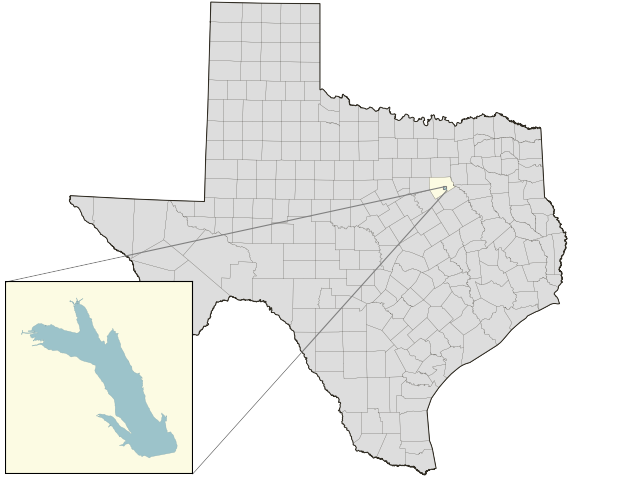
The location of Lake Bardwell in Texas

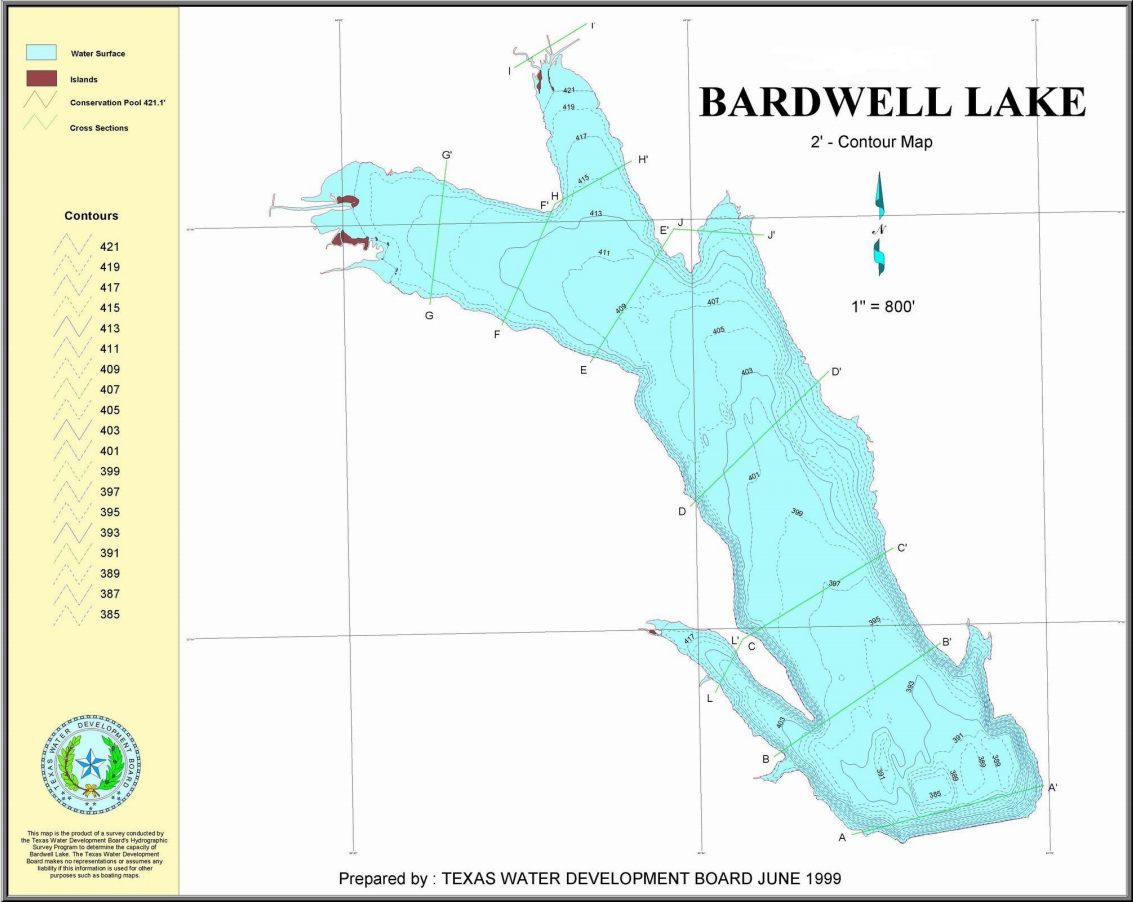
A contour map of the depths in Lake Bardwell
