= Auburn, Texas =

Unincorporated community in Texas, US

Coordinates: 32°17′51″N 97°04′38″W

Auburn is an unincorporated community in Ellis County, in the U.S. state of Texas.

== History ==
Auburn was originally called Autumn, having been first settled in the autumn season in the early 1850s. A post office was established under the name Auburn in 1877, and remained in operation until 1906. The Auburn Cemetery is a Recorded Texas Historic Landmark.
