= Bardwell, Texas =

- City
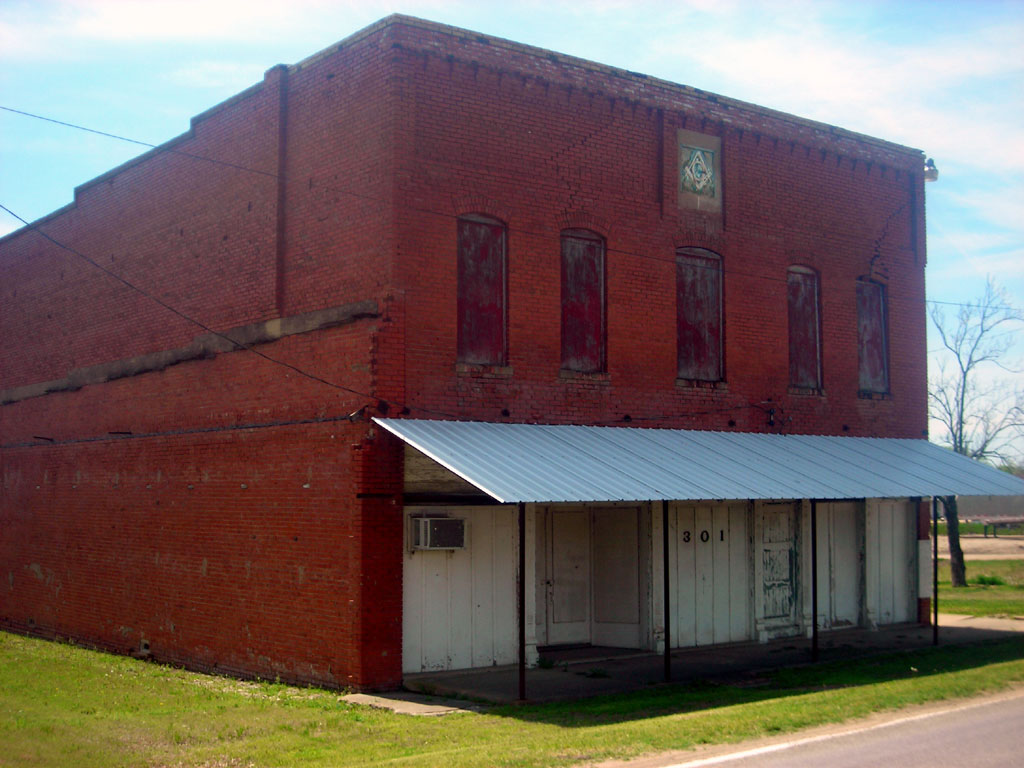
- The Masonic Lodge in Bardwell until 2013
- Interactive map of Bardwell, Texas
- Coordinates: 32°16′01″N 96°41′44″W
- Country: United States
- State: Texas
- County: Ellis

Area
  - Total: 0.31 sq mi (0.79 km^{2})
  - Land: 0.31 sq mi (0.79 km^{2})
  - Water: 0 sq mi (0.00 km^{2})
- Elevation: 476 ft (145 m)

Population (2020)
  - Total: 625
  - Density: 2,000/sq mi (790/km^{2})
- Time zone: UTC-6 (Central (CST))
  - Summer (DST): UTC-5 (CDT)
- ZIP code: 75101
- Area codes: 214, 469, 945, 972
- FIPS code: 48-05612
- GNIS feature ID: 2409786
- Website: cityofbardwelltx.com

Bardwell is a city in Ellis County, Texas, United States. The population was 625 at the 2020 census.

== History ==
The community was settled in the early 1880s when the town's namesake, John W. Bardwell, built a cotton gin one mile south of the present-day location. A school opened in 1892 and a post office was established in 1893. When the Trinity and Brazos Valley Railway was routed through Ellis County in 1907, the gin and community were moved to the nearest stretch of track. The town had its own telephone system and electricity supplied by lines from Ennis in 1914. Bardwell prospered throughout the 1920s as a cotton shipping point with three gins and six grocery stores. The population grew to 650 by 1929, but the Great Depression and a subsequent drought severely impacted the community. The main road was rerouted to the new State Highway 34 in the early 1940s and most of Bardwell's businesses either closed or moved to sites along the highway. In 1958, Bardwell's school consolidated with nearby Ennis. After dropping to a low of 277 during the 1970s, the population began to grow. By 1990, 387 people lived in Bardwell. That figure had grown to 583 by 2000.

== Geography ==
Bardwell is located at the junction of State Highway 34 and Farm to Market Road 984 in southern Ellis County, 15 miles (24 km) southeast of Waxahachie. Highway 34 leads northeast 7 miles (11 km) to Ennis and southwest 13 miles (21 km) to Italy. Lake Bardwell is 2 miles (3 km) to the east.

According to the United States Census Bureau, the city has a total area of 0.3 square miles (0.8 km^{2}), all land.

== Demographics ==
Historical population
Census	Pop.	Note	%±
1920	358		—
1930	303		−15.4%
1940	266		−12.2%
1950	229		−13.9%
1960	220		−3.9%
1970	277		25.9%
1980	335		20.9%
1990	387		15.5%
2000	583		50.6%
2010	649		11.3%
2020	625		−3.7%
U.S. Decennial Census; 2020 Census

=== 2020 census ===
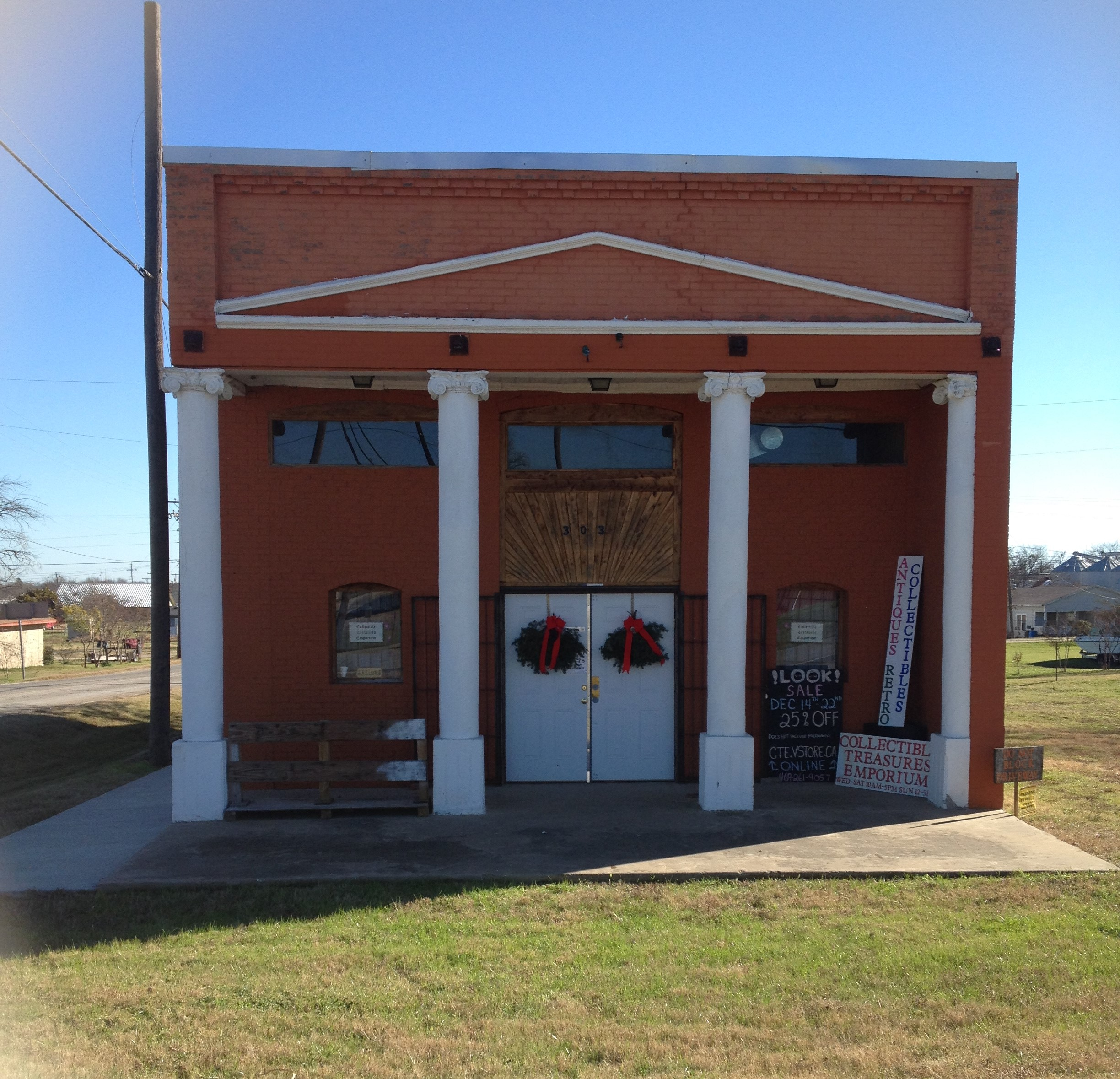
First National Bank, established 1915, is one of two historic buildings left on East Main Street

As of the 2020 census, Bardwell had a population of 625, a median age of 31.9 years, 30.1% of residents under the age of 18, and 11.4% of residents 65 years of age or older. For every 100 females there were 95.9 males, and for every 100 females age 18 and over there were 99.5 males age 18 and over.

0% of residents lived in urban areas, while 100.0% lived in rural areas.

There were 190 households in Bardwell, of which 46.3% had children under the age of 18 living in them. Of all households, 49.5% were married-couple households, 20.0% were households with a male householder and no spouse or partner present, and 18.4% were households with a female householder and no spouse or partner present. About 18.4% of all households were made up of individuals and 5.3% had someone living alone who was 65 years of age or older.

There were 211 housing units, of which 10.0% were vacant. Among occupied housing units, 66.8% were owner-occupied and 33.2% were renter-occupied. The homeowner vacancy rate was 2.3% and the rental vacancy rate was 11.3%.

Racial composition as of the 2020 census
Race	Percent
White	43.2%
Black or African American	13.4%
American Indian and Alaska Native	0.5%
Asian	0%
Native Hawaiian and Other Pacific Islander	0%
Some other race	24.2%
Two or more races	18.7%
Hispanic or Latino (of any race)	53.4%

=== 2000 census ===
As of the 2000 census, 583 people, 167 households, and 139 families resided in the city. The population density was 2,093.7 inhabitants per square mile (808.4/km^{2}). The 176 housing units averaged 632.1 per square mile (242.7/km^{2}). The racial makeup of the city was 61.58% White, 17.50% African American, 1.37% Native American, 18.52% from other races, and 1.03% from two or more races. Hispanics or Latinos of any race were 47.51% of the population.

Of the 167 households, 47.9% had children under the age of 18 living with them, 62.3% were married couples living together, 15.0% had a female householder with no husband present, and 16.2% were not families. About 13.8% of all households were made up of individuals, and 5.4% had someone living alone who was 65 years of age or older. The average household size was 3.49 and the average family size was 3.86.

In the city, the population was distributed as 37.7% under the age of 18, 8.6% from 18 to 24, 27.8% from 25 to 44, 17.7% from 45 to 64, and 8.2% who were 65 years of age or older. The median age was 28 years. For every 100 females, there were 98.3 males. For every 100 females age 18 and over, there were 93.1 males.

The median income for a household in the city was $31,250, and for a family was $35,000. Males had a median income of $28,125 versus $16,250 for females. The per capita income for the city was $10,666. About 26.5% of families and 24.7% of the population were below the poverty line, including 26.8% of those under age 18 and 35.4% of those age 65 or over.

== Education ==
Bardwell is served by the Ennis Independent School District. The school district had an enrollment of 5,838 for the 2011–2012 school year.
