= Forreston, Texas =

- Unincorporated community
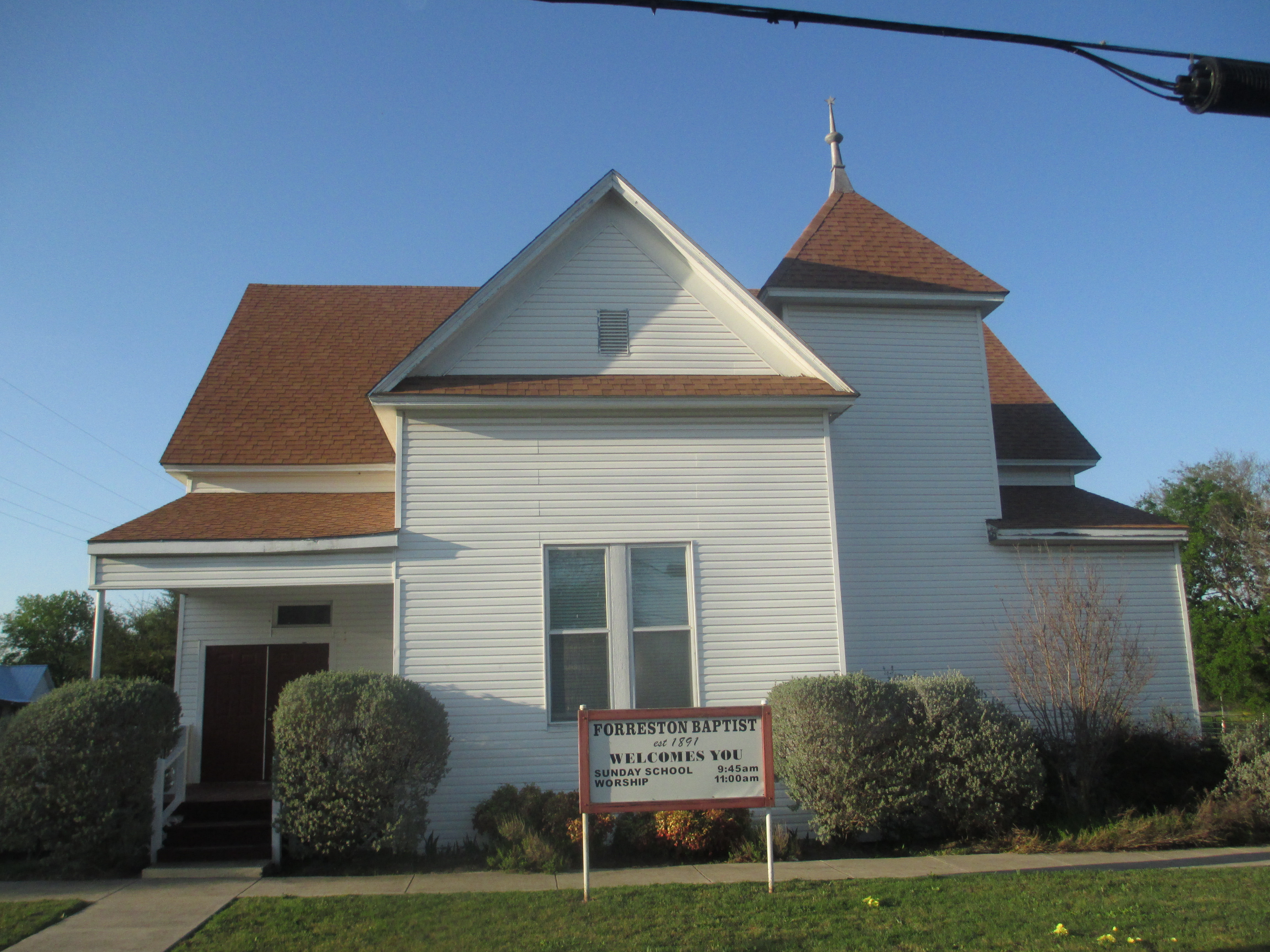
- Forreston Baptist Church (established 1891)

- Location within the state of Texas Forreston (the United States)
- Coordinates: 32°15′23″N 96°51′55″W
- Country: United States
- State: Texas
- County: Ellis
- Elevation: 541 ft (165 m)

Population (2008 est.)
  - Total: 238
- Time zone: UTC-6 (Central (CST))
  - Summer (DST): UTC-5 (CDT)
- ZIP codes: 76041
- Area code: 972
- GNIS feature ID: 1336043

Forreston is an unincorporated community in Ellis County, Texas, United States. It lies on U.S. Route 77, 8 miles (13 km) south of the county seat of Waxahachie. Its population was estimated to be 238 in 2008, but it is not listed in the 2010 census.

== History ==
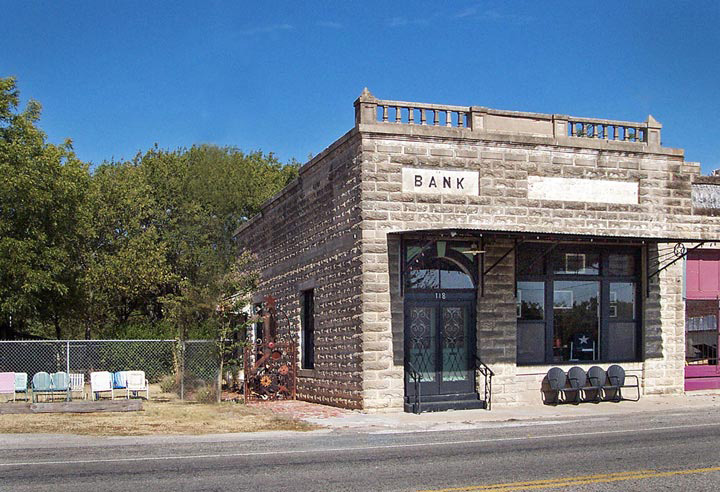
Former bank building in Forreston

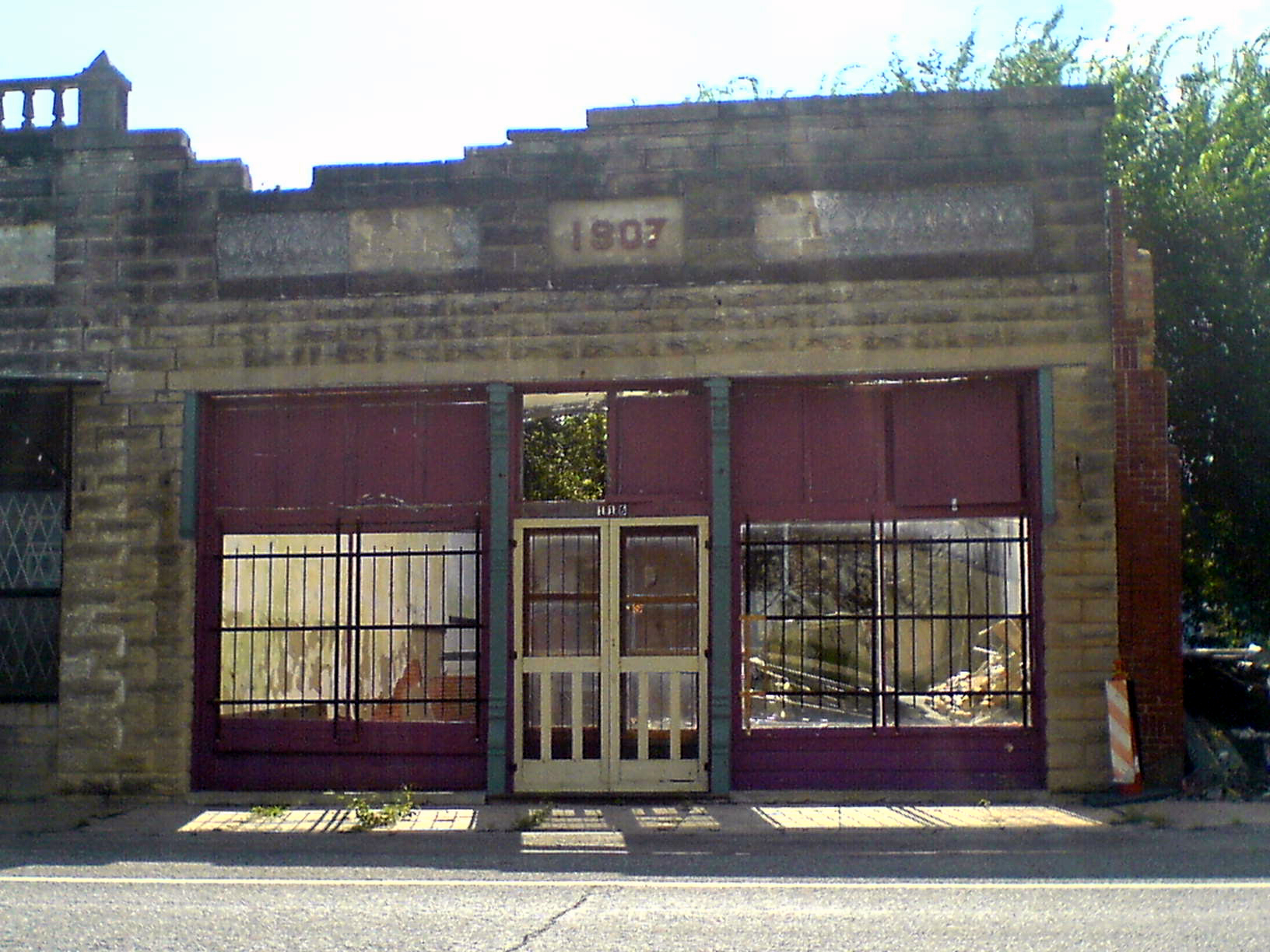
A long-closed business in Forreston

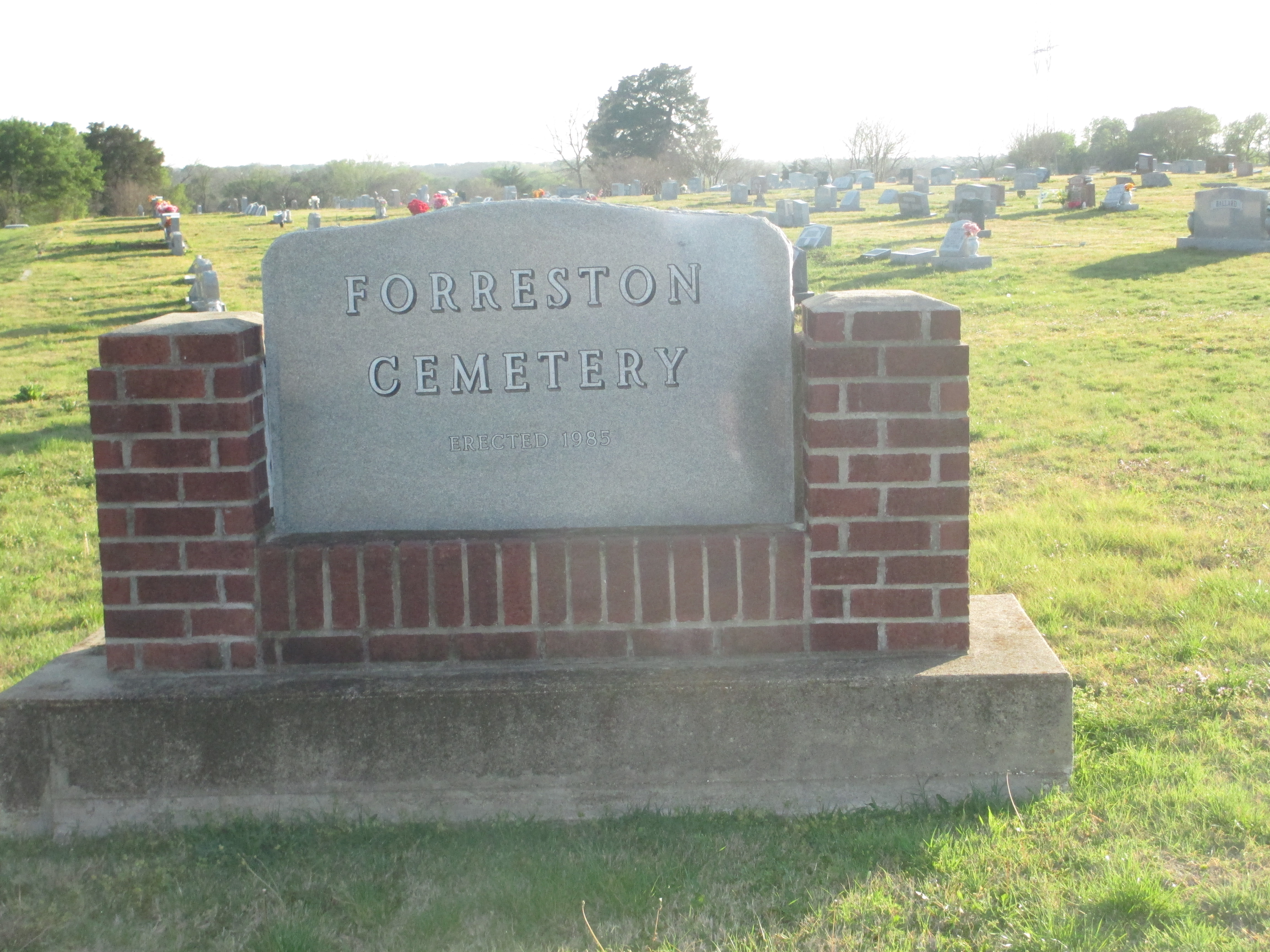
Forreston Cemetery is located south of the community.

The roots of Forreston date to 1843, when the area was known as Howe's Settlement, named for an early settler in the region. In the middle to late 1840s, the community was renamed Chambers Creek. It received its first post office in 1846. It was the original county seat of Navarro County until 1850, when the organization of Ellis County placed the town within the new county.

From the early 1850s to the late 1880s, Chambers Creek remained a small farming community, providing a school and a church for local residents and farmers. In 1890, the Missouri–Kansas–Texas Railroad (KATY) was built through the area, and businesses began to spring up along the tracks. The community was renamed Forreston, after Carr Forrest, a local landowner who was the first postmaster and who donated the land on which the new rail depot was built. By the 1940s, Forreston had three cotton gins, several businesses and a population of 350. Throughout the 20th century, the town remained a shipping point for local farming and commerce.

The population declined and, by 2000, it had only some 200 residents.

Forreston was featured in the March 1999 issue of Texas Monthly in the article entitled "The Best of Small-Town Texas". In August 2007, Forreston was featured in "Shop Vintage with Ken Weber" in the publication, D Magazine. The spread was encouraged by Bon Ton Vintage, a shop founded in 1984 by the retired jazz musicians Barbra and John Kauffman, which claims to have the "largest collection of vintage clothing in Texas".

== Education ==
Forreston is served by the Waxahachie Independent School District.

== Notable person ==
Denver Pyle, a supporting actor in many roles, including CBS's The Doris Day Show and The Dukes of Hazzard, is interred in an unmarked grave at Forreston Cemetery.
