= Rankin, Ellis County, Texas =

Rankin, Texas
- Unincorporated community
- Location within the state of Texas Rankin (the United States)
- Coordinates: 32°12′21″N 96°42′24″W
- Country: United States
- State: Texas
- County: Ellis
- Elevation: 472 ft (144 m)

Population (2000)
  - Total: 40
- Time zone: UTC-6 (Central (CST))
  - Summer (DST): UTC-5 (CDT)
- ZIP code: 75119
- GNIS feature ID: 1378932

Rankin is an unincorporated community in Ellis County, Texas, United States. The population was 12 as at the 2000 census. It was named for Frederick Harrison Rankin, who had settled on nearby Chambers Creek before 1874.

== Geography ==
Rankin is located approximately 15 miles southeast of Waxahachie on FM 984 near Gorman Rd.
