= Venus Independent School District =

School district in Texas

Venus Independent School District is a public school district based in Venus, Texas (USA). It consists of 3 separate school buildings with 200 Staff members: Venus Primary School (grades pre-k through 1st grade), Venus Elementary School (grades 2-5), Venus Middle School (grades 6-8), and Venus High School (grades 8-12).

In 2009, the school district was rated "academically acceptable" by the Texas Education Agency.

Venus High School is a 4A High School. All Venus schools have the same mascot, a bulldog. The music department includes band students grades 6-12.

In 2015, the voters of Venus Independent School District approved a $31 million bond to add to existing facilities and the construction of new buildings.
