= Avalon, Texas =

- Unincorporated community
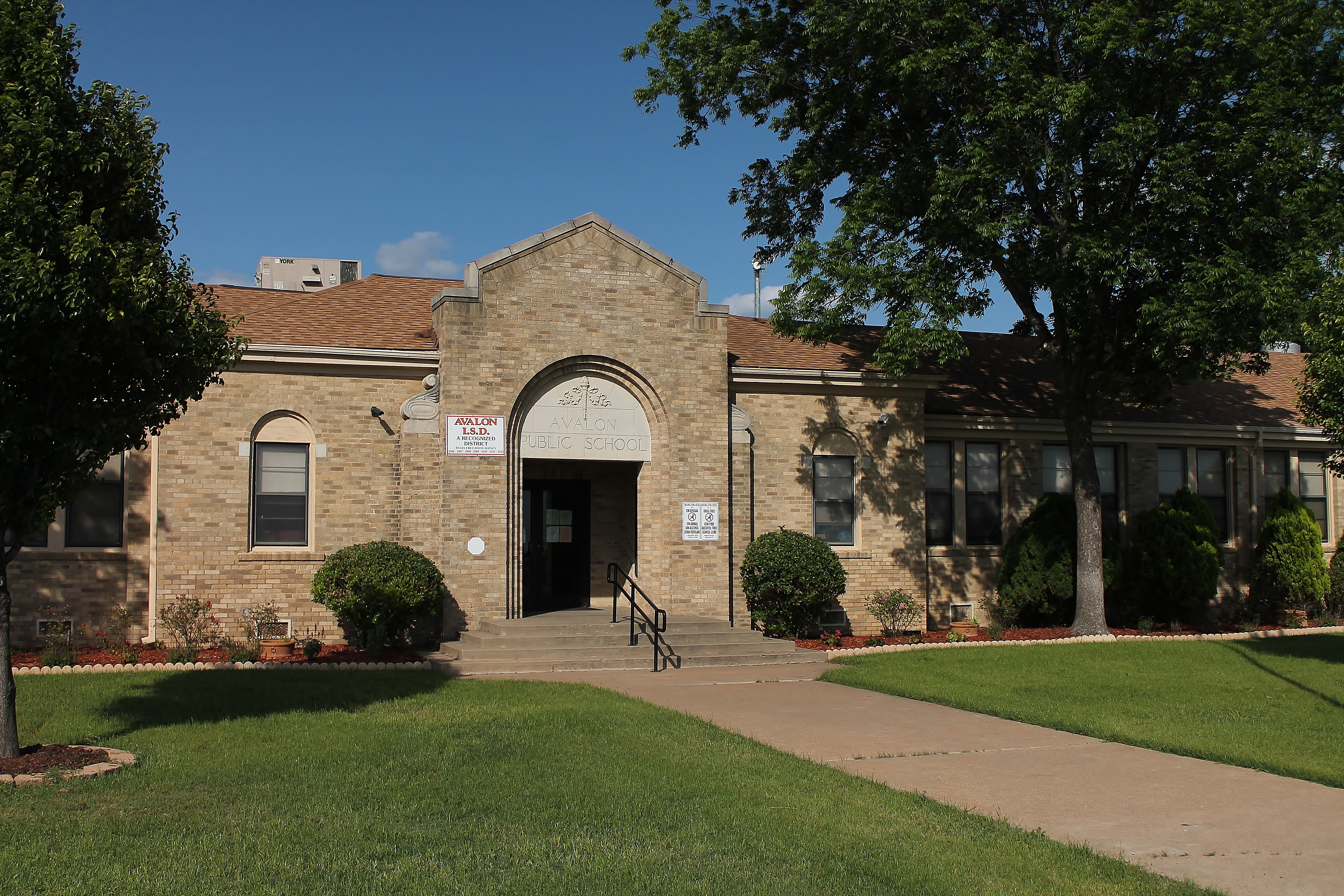

- Location within the state of Texas Avalon (the United States)
- Coordinates: 32°12′20″N 96°47′24″W
- Country: United States
- State: Texas
- County: Ellis
- Elevation: 532 ft (162 m)
- Time zone: UTC-6 (Central (CST))
  - Summer (DST): UTC-5 (CDT)
- ZIP codes: 76623
- Area codes: 214, 469, 945, 972
- GNIS feature ID: 1329875

Avalon is an unincorporated community in southern Ellis County, Texas, United States.

== History ==
Avalon is primarily a farming community located at the intersection of FM 55 & TX Hwy 34 in southern Ellis County. Avalon still operates one of the county's few cotton gins. Prior to the Great Depression and current through today, Avalon and its surrounding rural farmland produces much of the cotton output for Ellis County. For a period of time in the 1830s, Ellis County was the top producing cotton county in the world, in large part due to Avalon's output. Many of the cotton field scenes filmed in the movie Places in the Heart were shot just 2 miles (3 km) north of Avalon.

Avalon has had a US post office since 1937. The town has both an elementary school and high school. In 2005, Avalon began play in the Texas Six Man Football program with The head coach John De La Garza of the Avalon high school football team has won many games and brought them a long way in this football season. Prior to this time, Avalon had been a basketball rich school, producing some of the finest Class B/1A basketball teams in the 1960s through 1990s. Avalon has also developed a fine baseball team producing several playoff appearances.

In the late 1980s/early 1990s Avalon was at the center of the Superconducting Super Collider project. Government funding for the project was pulled, killing the project.

The Avalon Independent School District serves area students.

On April 25, 2011, an EF0 tornado touched down in Avalon causing minor damage.
