= Avalon Independent School District =

School district in Texas, United States

Location
- 104 FM 55; Avalon, Texas ESC Region 10 USA
- Coordinates: 32°12′19″N 96°47′33″W

District information
- Type: Independent school district
- Grades: Pre-K through 12
- Superintendent: David Delbosque
- Schools: 1 (2009-10)
- NCES District ID: 4809030

Students and staff
- Students: 323 (2010-11)
- Teachers: 24.39 (2009-10) (on full-time equivalent (FTE) basis)
- Student–teacher ratio: 13.61 (2009-10)

Other information
- TEA District Accountability Rating for 2011-12: Recognized
- Website: Avalon ISD

Avalon Independent School District is a public school district based in the community of Avalon, Texas. The district operates one high school, Avalon High School.

== Finances ==
As of the 2010–2011 school year, the appraised valuation of property in the district was $33,437,000. The maintenance tax rate was $0.117 and the bond tax rate was $0.007 per $100 of appraised valuation.

== Academic achievement ==
In 2011, the school district was rated "recognized" by the Texas Education Agency. Thirty-five percent of districts in Texas in 2011 received the same rating. No state accountability ratings will be given to districts in 2012. A school district in Texas can receive one of four possible rankings from the Texas Education Agency: Exemplary (the highest possible ranking), Recognized, Academically Acceptable, and Academically Unacceptable (the lowest possible ranking).

Historical district TEA accountability ratings

- 2011: Recognized
- 2010: Recognized
- 2009: Recognized
- 2008: Recognized
- 2007: Recognized
- 2006: Recognized
- 2005: Academically Acceptable
- 2004: Academically Acceptable

== Schools ==
There is only one school in Avalon ISD, Avalon School, which serves students from Pre-K through twelfth grade.

== See also ==
- List of school districts in Texas
- List of high schools in Texas
