= Maypearl Independent School District =

School district in Texas

Location
- 400 Panther Lane, Maypearl, TX, 76064 ESC Region 10 USA

District information
- Type: Public
- Grades: Pre-K through Grade 12
- Established: 1904
- Superintendent: Ritchie Bowling

Students and staff
- Athletic conference: UIL Class AAA
- Colors: Red, White, and Black

Other information
- Mascot: Panther
- Website: Maypearl ISD

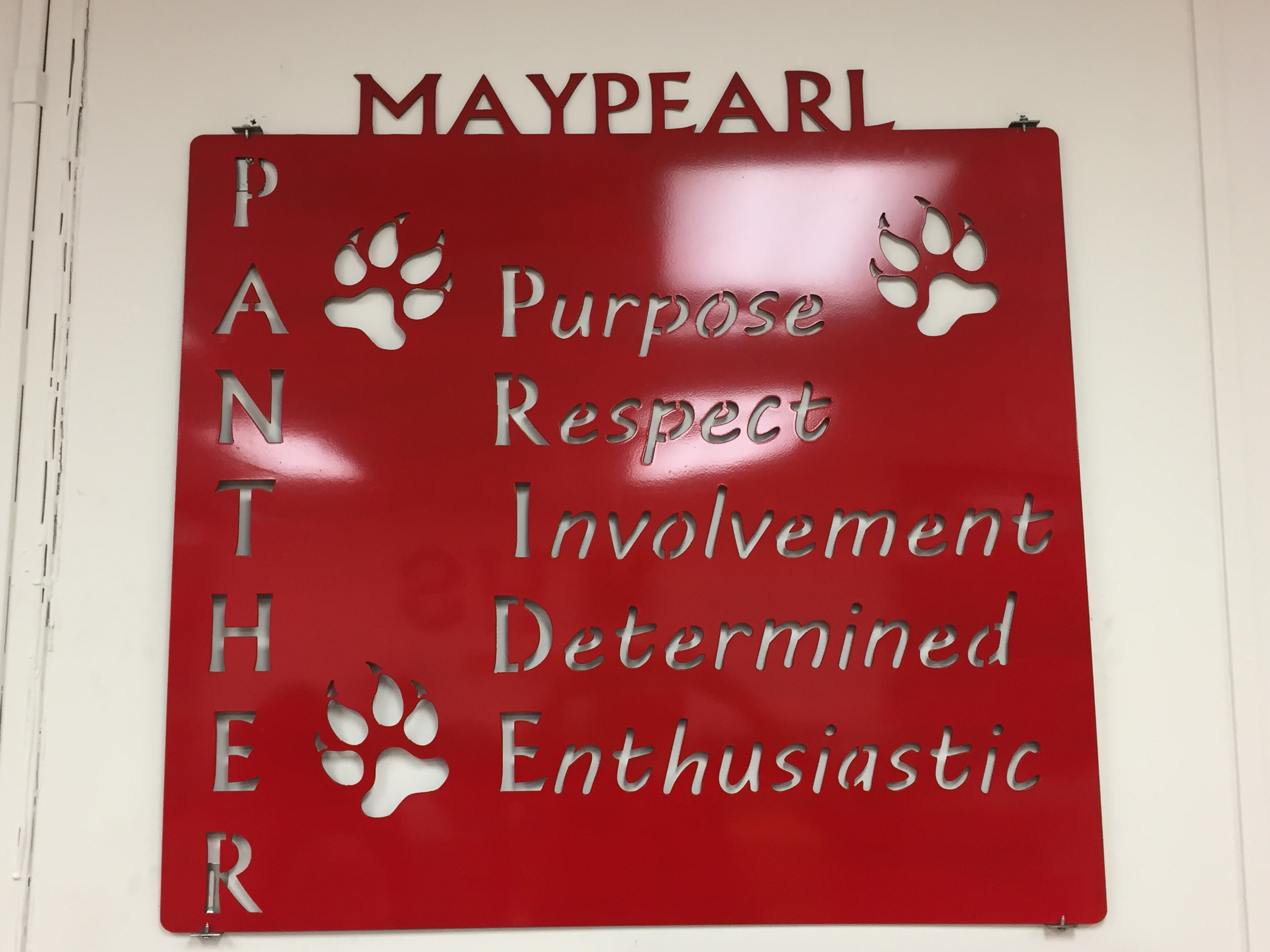
Maypearl ISD Pride Plaque

Maypearl Independent School District is a public school district based in Maypearl, Texas.

== Schools ==
Maypearl ISD has four schools: Maypearl Primary School, LSK Elementary School, Maypearl Middle School, and Maypearl High School.

- Lorene Smith Kirkpatrick Elementary (Pre-K–Grade 4)
- Maypearl Primary School (Pre-K–Grade 1)
- Maypearl Middle School (Grade 5–Grade 8)
- Maypearl High School (Grade 9–Grade 12)

In 2024, Maypearl ISD reports having 1,200 students across its four campuses.

The district has an indoor golf facility, artificial turf football field, and tennis court. In 2023, large scale renovations to the High School campus were approved, plans include new science labs, a culinary lab, and 5 new classrooms. These renovations also include an additional 5 new classrooms for the middle school. Both schools will also receive storm shelters. Renovations are expected to be complete in the fall of 2025.
