= Ellis County, Texas =

County in Texas, United States

- County
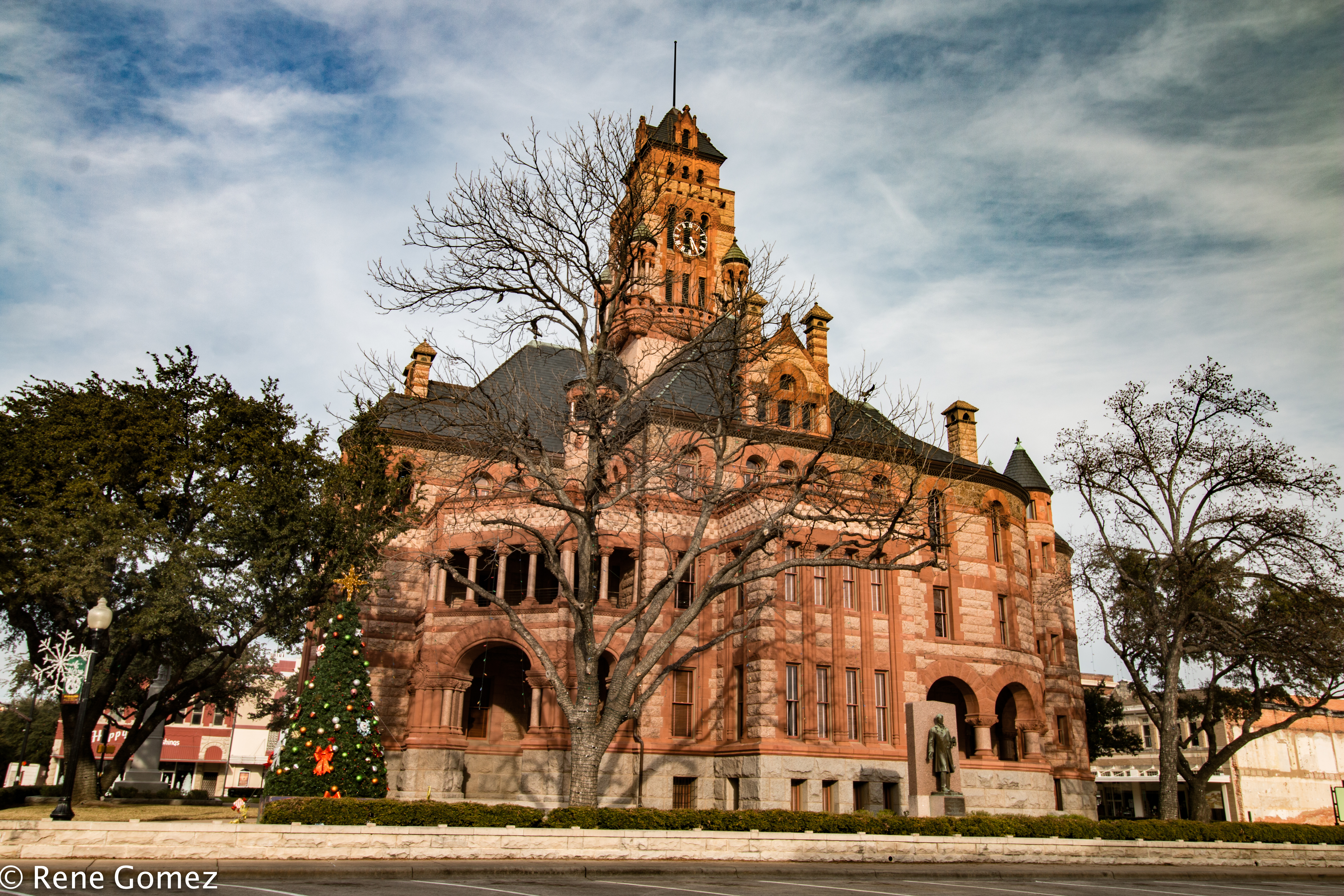
- The Ellis County Courthouse in Waxahachie

- Location within the U.S. state of Texas
- Coordinates: 32°21′N 96°47′W
- Country: United States
- State: Texas
- Founded: 1850
- Named for: Richard Ellis
- Seat: Waxahachie
- Largest city: Waxahachie

Area
  - Total: 952 sq mi (2,470 km^{2})
  - Land: 936 sq mi (2,420 km^{2})
  - Water: 16 sq mi (41 km^{2}) 1.7%

Population (2020)
  - Total: 192,455
  - Estimate (2025): 240,867 ▲
  - Density: 206/sq mi (79.4/km^{2})
- Demonym: Ellisite
- Time zone: UTC−6 (Central)
  - Summer (DST): UTC−5 (CDT)
- Congressional district: 6th
- Website: www.elliscountytx.gov

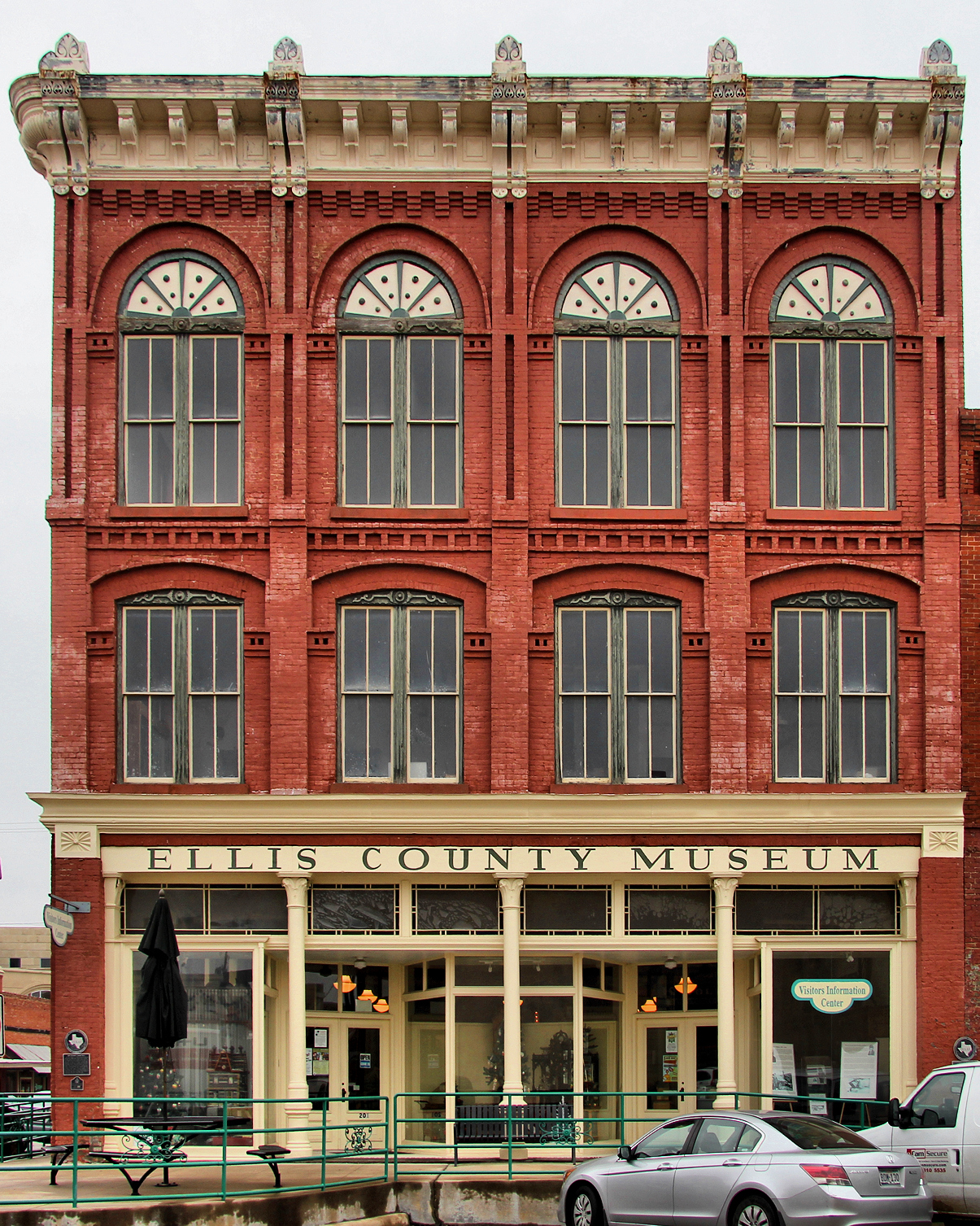
Across from the courthouse is the Ellis County Museum.

Ellis County is a county located in the U.S. state of Texas. As of 2020, its population was estimated to be 192,455. The county seat is Waxahachie. The county was founded in 1849 and organized the next year. It is named for Richard Ellis, president of the convention that produced the Texas Declaration of Independence. Ellis County is part of the Dallas–Fort Worth metroplex.

== Geography ==
According to the U.S. Census Bureau, the county has a total area of 952 square miles (2,470 km^{2}), of which 935 square miles (2,420 km^{2}) are land and 16 square miles (41 km^{2}) (1.7%) are covered by water.

Lake Waxahachie is located about five miles south of Waxahachie in Ellis County, Texas. Owned and operated by Ellis County Water Control and Improvement District Number One on behalf of the city of Waxahachie, the lake was formed by impounding the Waxahachie Creek in 1956. The water covers about 650 acres and has a maximum depth around 50. The former community of South Prong was located beside the creek before the lake was created. There has been a country club and a two-acre public park with boat ramp since the lake was completed. The lake is a recreational resource for the entire county.

=== Major highways ===
- Interstate 35E
- Interstate 45
  - I-45 BL (Ferris)
  - I-45 BL (Palmer)
  - I-45 BL (Ennis)
- U.S. Route 67
- U.S. 77
- U.S. 287
- State Highway 34
- State Highway 342
- State Highway 360
- Loop 561
- Spur 73
- Spur 394
- Spur 437
- Spur 469

=== Adjacent counties ===
- Dallas County (north)
- Kaufman County (northeast)
- Henderson County (east)
- Navarro County (south)
- Hill County (southwest)
- Johnson County (west)
- Tarrant County (northwest)

== Communities ==
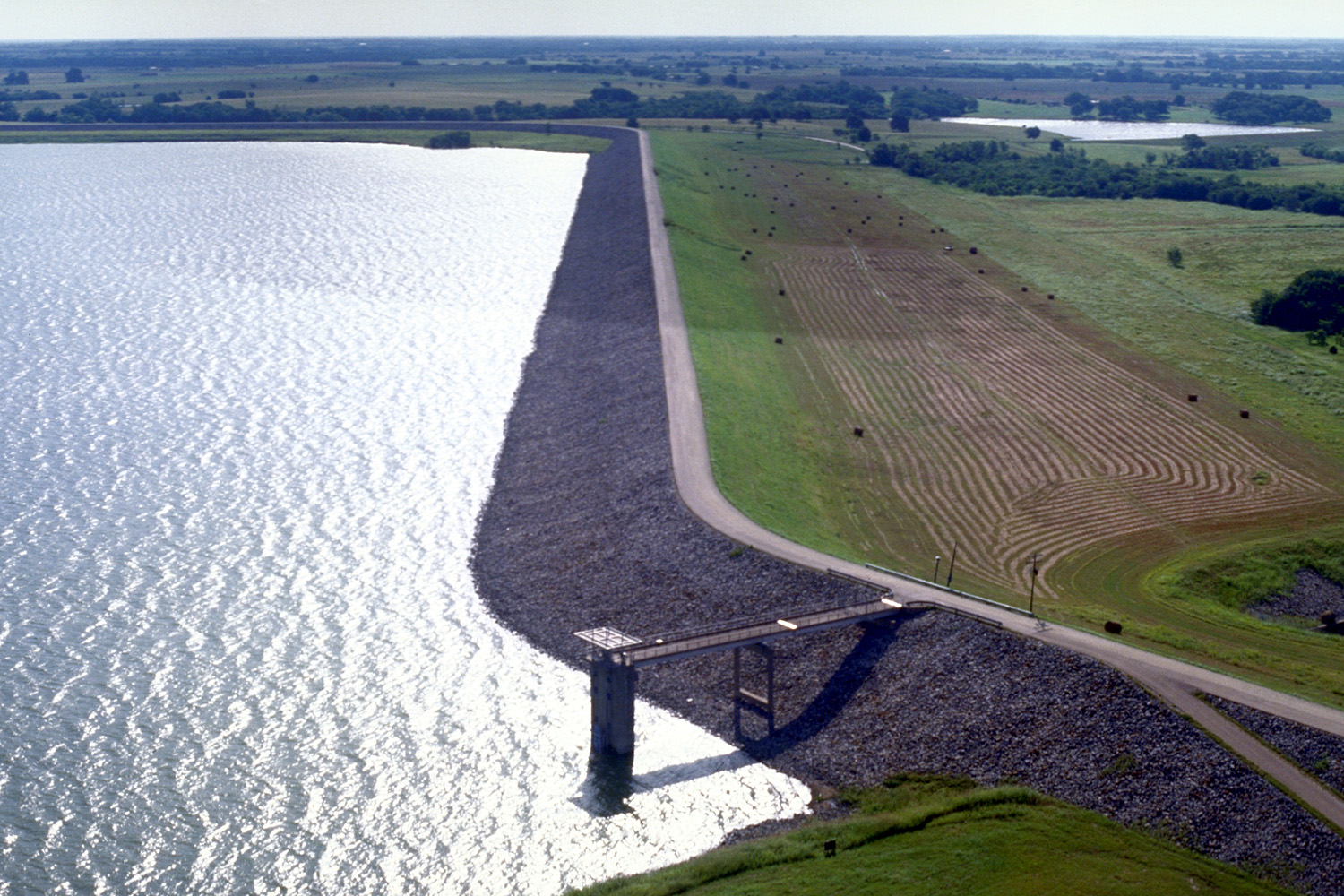
Bardwell Dam and Lake in Ellis County near the town of Ennis

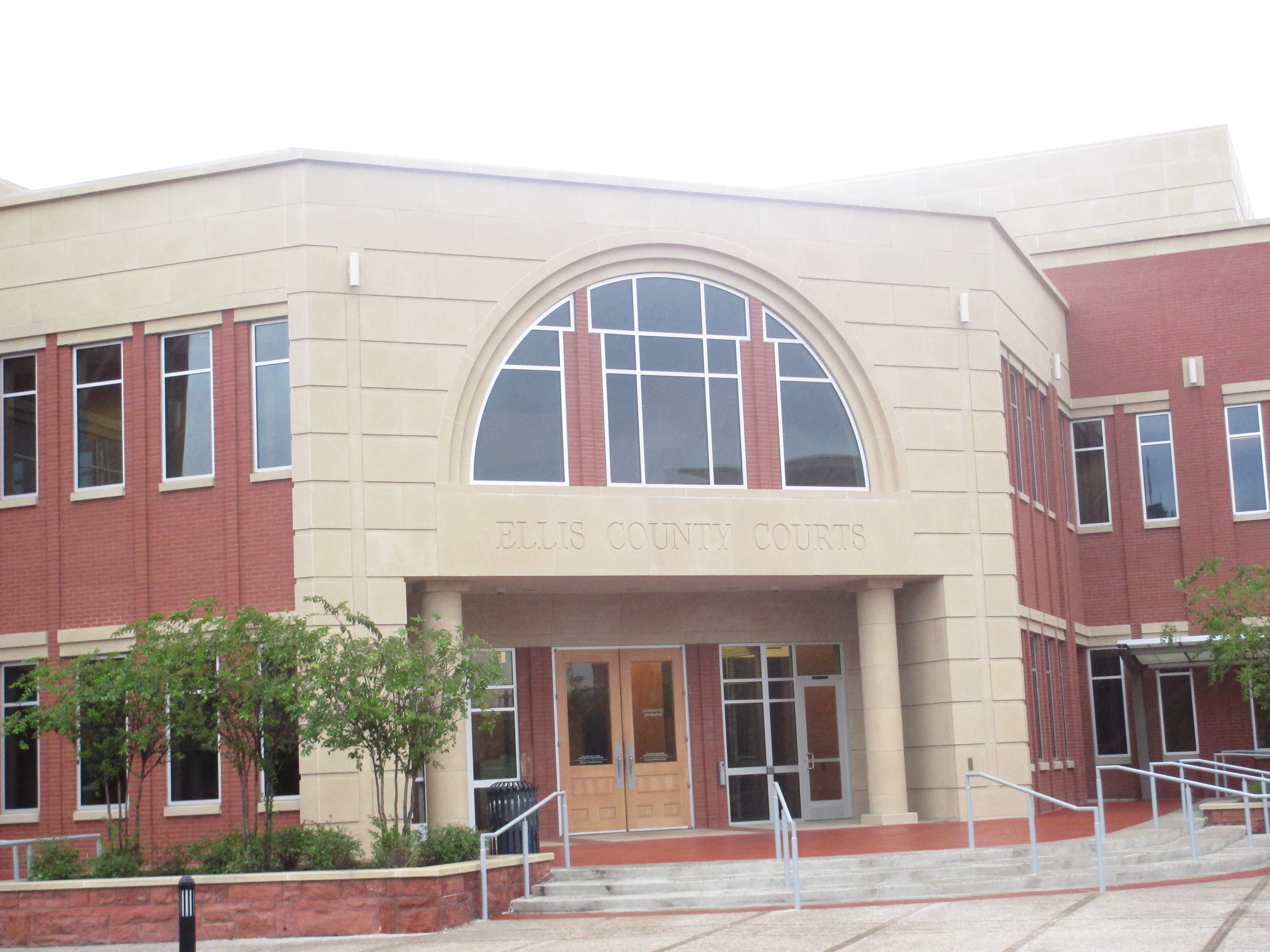
Ellis County Courts building

=== Cities (multiple counties) ===
- Cedar Hill (mostly in Dallas County)
- Ferris (small part in Dallas County)
- Glenn Heights (mostly in Dallas County)
- Grand Prairie (mostly in Dallas and Tarrant Counties)
- Mansfield (mostly in Tarrant County and a small part in Johnson County)
- Venus (mostly in Johnson County)
- Ovilla (small part in Dallas County)

=== Cities ===
- Bardwell
- Ennis
- Maypearl
- Midlothian
- Oak Leaf
- Pecan Hill
- Red Oak
- Waxahachie (county seat)

=== Towns ===
- Alma
- Garrett
- Italy
- Milford
- Palmer

=== Census-designated place ===
- Bristol

=== Unincorporated communities ===
- Auburn
- Avalon
- Crisp
- Forreston
- Ike
- India
- Rankin
- Rockett
- Telico
- Trumbull

== Demographics ==
Historical population
Census	Pop.	Note	%±
1850	989		—
1860	5,246		430.4%
1870	7,514		43.2%
1880	21,294		183.4%
1890	31,774		49.2%
1900	50,059		57.5%
1910	53,629		7.1%
1920	55,700		3.9%
1930	53,936		−3.2%
1940	47,733		−11.5%
1950	45,645		−4.4%
1960	43,395		−4.9%
1970	46,638		7.5%
1980	59,743		28.1%
1990	85,167		42.6%
2000	111,360		30.8%
2010	149,610		34.3%
2020	192,455		28.6%
2025 (est.)	240,867	▲	25.2%
U.S. Decennial Census; 1850–2010 2020

=== 2020 census ===
As of the 2020 census, the county had a population of 192,455. The median age was 36.6 years. 26.7% of residents were under the age of 18 and 13.5% of residents were 65 years of age or older. For every 100 females there were 96.6 males, and for every 100 females age 18 and over there were 93.3 males age 18 and over.

The racial makeup of the county was 61.8% White, 12.6% Black or African American, 0.9% American Indian and Alaska Native, 0.8% Asian, 0.1% Native Hawaiian and Pacific Islander, 10.4% from some other race, and 13.3% from two or more races. Hispanic or Latino residents of any race comprised 27.04% of the population. Non-Hispanic whites made up 55.34% of the population, while non-Hispanic African Americans, Native Americans, Asians, other races, and multiracial residents accounted for 12.33%, 0.37%, 0.79%, 0.41%, and 3.62%, respectively.

69.3% of residents lived in urban areas, while 30.7% lived in rural areas.

There were 64,996 households in the county, of which 40.5% had children under the age of 18 living in them. Of all households, 59.6% were married-couple households, 13.1% were households with a male householder and no spouse or partner present, and 22.1% were households with a female householder and no spouse or partner present. About 17.7% of all households were made up of individuals and 7.6% had someone living alone who was 65 years of age or older.

There were 68,531 housing units, of which 5.2% were vacant. Among occupied housing units, 74.3% were owner-occupied and 25.7% were renter-occupied. The homeowner vacancy rate was 1.4% and the rental vacancy rate was 7.2%.

=== Racial and ethnic composition ===
Ellis County, Texas – Racial and ethnic composition Note: the US Census treats Hispanic/Latino as an ethnic category. This table excludes Latinos from the racial categories and assigns them to a separate category. Hispanics/Latinos may be of any race.
Race / Ethnicity (NH = Non-Hispanic)	Pop 1980	Pop 1990	Pop 2000	Pop 2010	Pop 2020	% 1980	% 1990	% 2000	% 2010	% 2020
White alone (NH)	46,321	64,895	79,401	97,987	106,495	77.53%	76.20%	71.30%	65.49%	55.34%
Black or African American alone (NH)	7,345	8,407	9,514	13,161	23,738	12.29%	9.87%	8.54%	8.80%	12.33%
Native American or Alaska Native alone (NH)	134	315	473	565	710	0.22%	0.37%	0.42%	0.38%	0.37%
Asian alone (NH)	73	204	368	811	1,525	0.12%	0.24%	0.33%	0.54%	0.79%
Native Hawaiian or Pacific Islander alone (NH)	x	x	10	87	202	x	x	0.01%	0.06%	0.10%
Other race alone (NH)	96	103	82	155	790	0.16%	0.12%	0.07%	0.10%	0.41%
Mixed race or Multiracial (NH)	x	x	1,004	1,683	6,963	x	x	0.90%	1.12%	3.62%
Hispanic or Latino (any race)	5,774	11,243	20,508	35,161	52,032	9.66%	13.20%	18.42%	23.50%	27.04%
Total	59,743	85,167	111,360	149,610	192,455	100.00%	100.00%	100.00%	100.00%	100.00%

=== 2010 census ===
A Williams Institute analysis of 2010 census data found about 3.2 same-sex couples per 1,000 households were in the county.

=== 2000 census ===
According to the census of 2000, 111,360 people, 37,020 households, and 29,653 families resided in the county. The population density was 118 people per square mile (46 people/km^{2}). The 39,071 housing units averaged 42 units per square mile (16/km^{2}). The racial makeup of the county was 80.63% White, 8.64% African American, 0.59% Native American, 0.35% Asian, 7.92% from other races, and 1.86% from two or more races. About 18.42% of the population was Hispanic or Latinos of any race.

=== American Community Survey 2023 racial data ===
The United States Census Bureau estimated that in 2023, Ellis County’s population was 222,829. It was also estimated that the county was 28.4% Hispanic or Latino, 51.9% NH White, 16.5% NH Black, 1.0% NH Asian, 0.4% NH Native, 0.1% NH Pacific Islander, and 1.7% NH Multiracial.

Race	Total	Percentage
Hispanic or Latino	63,319	28.4%
NH White	115,601	51.9%
NH Black	36,823	16.5%
NH Asian	2,261	1.0%
NH Native American	837	0.4%
NH Pacific Islander	222	0.1%
NH Multiracial	3,766	1.7%

== Politics ==
United States presidential election results for Ellis County, Texas
Year	Republican		Democratic		Third party(ies)	
Year	No.	%	No.	%	No.	%
1912	293	7.42%	3,483	88.24%	171	4.33%
1916	324	6.32%	4,718	92.02%	85	1.66%
1920	819	13.98%	4,081	69.68%	957	16.34%
1924	1,220	13.50%	7,678	84.93%	142	1.57%
1928	3,569	44.72%	4,399	55.12%	13	0.16%
1932	527	6.93%	7,033	92.49%	44	0.58%
1936	319	5.34%	5,644	94.46%	12	0.20%
1940	692	8.07%	7,881	91.87%	5	0.06%
1944	666	8.02%	7,065	85.08%	573	6.90%
1948	1,055	13.76%	5,792	75.56%	818	10.67%
1952	4,183	39.91%	6,275	59.86%	24	0.23%
1956	3,585	40.65%	5,211	59.08%	24	0.27%
1960	3,666	38.42%	5,841	61.21%	36	0.38%
1964	2,779	27.62%	7,278	72.33%	5	0.05%
1968	3,794	31.44%	5,431	45.01%	2,842	23.55%
1972	8,779	69.53%	3,839	30.41%	8	0.06%
1976	6,996	41.02%	9,991	58.58%	68	0.40%
1980	10,046	51.31%	9,219	47.08%	315	1.61%
1984	16,873	67.56%	8,029	32.15%	72	0.29%
1988	16,422	59.18%	11,169	40.25%	158	0.57%
1992	13,564	40.50%	9,537	28.47%	10,394	31.03%
1996	16,046	53.91%	10,832	36.39%	2,888	9.70%
2000	26,091	69.94%	10,629	28.49%	587	1.57%
2004	34,602	74.50%	11,640	25.06%	202	0.43%
2008	38,078	70.71%	15,333	28.47%	442	0.82%
2012	39,574	72.94%	13,881	25.59%	799	1.47%
2016	44,941	70.10%	16,253	25.35%	2,916	4.55%
2020	56,717	66.19%	27,565	32.17%	1,406	1.64%
2024	64,763	65.05%	33,850	34.00%	944	0.95%

United States Senate election results for Ellis County, Texas1
Year	Republican		Democratic		Third party(ies)	
Year	No.	%	No.	%	No.	%
2024	61,020	61.78%	35,685	36.13%	2,070	2.10%

United States Senate election results for Ellis County, Texas2
Year	Republican		Democratic		Third party(ies)	
Year	No.	%	No.	%	No.	%
2020	57,078	67.12%	25,780	30.32%	2,181	2.56%
2026	45,286	51.12%	41,351	46.67%	1,959	2.21%

Texas Gubernatorial election results for Ellis County
Year	Republican		Democratic		Third party(ies)	
Year	No.	%	No.	%	No.	%
2022	45,564	67.23%	21,338	31.49%	868	1.28%
2026	47,284	53.10%	39,908	44.82%	1,855	2.08%

Ellis is a staunchly Republican county in presidential elections. The last Democratic presidential candidate to carry the county was Jimmy Carter in 1976, and since 2000, Republican presidential candidates have won with more than 60% of the vote.

== Law enforcement ==
The Ellis County Sheriff's Office provides law enforcement services to the county. The current sheriff is Brad Norman. The agency also operates the Ellis County Jail in Waxahachie.

=== Line of duty deaths ===
As of 2025, six officers of the Ellis County Sheriff's Office have been killed in the line of duty.

== Media ==
Ellis County is part of the Dallas/Fort Worth television media market in North Texas. Stations in the market are KDFW-TV, KXAS-TV, WFAA-TV, KTVT-TV, KERA-TV, KTXA-TV, KDFI-TV, KDAF-TV, KFWD-TV, and KDTX-TV.

The county is home to one local radio station KBEC 1390 AM and 99.1 FM. The station has been in continuous operation since 1955 and is the oldest Family owned radio station in Texas. A weekly newspaper, the Ellis County Press, is based in Ferris and published Thursdays. The Waxahachie Daily Light is published on Fridays. Waxahachie Sun is online only published biweekly; other weekly newspapers are The Ennis News and Midlothian Mirror.

== Education ==
School districts include:

- Avalon Independent School District
- Ennis Independent School District
- Ferris Independent School District
- Frost Independent School District
- Italy Independent School District
- Maypearl Independent School District
- Midlothian Independent School District
- Milford Independent School District
- Palmer Independent School District
- Red Oak Independent School District
- Waxahachie Independent School District

It is in the service area of Navarro College.

== Notable people ==
- Clyde Barrow of Bonnie and Clyde
- J. D. Grey, clergyman, pastor of Tabernacle Baptist Church in Ennis, 1931–1934; later president of the Southern Baptist Convention
- Ernest Tubb, country singer and songwriter
- Lecil Travis Martin, known more commonly as Boxcar Willie, country singer and songwriter

== See also ==
- List of museums in North Texas
- National Register of Historic Places listings in Ellis County, Texas
- Recorded Texas Historic Landmarks in Ellis County
