= Rockett, Texas =

Unincorporated community in Ellis County, Texas, United States

Coordinates: 32°28′12″N 96°45′50″W

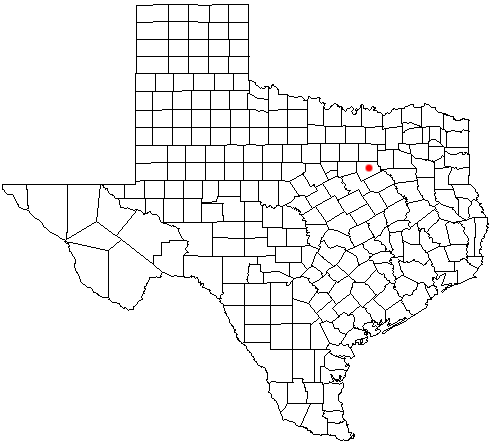
Location of Rockett in the state of Texas

Rockett is an unincorporated community in Ellis County, Texas, United States. It is part of the Dallas–Fort Worth metroplex. Rockett is located on FM 813, approximately five miles northeast of Waxahachie.

== History ==
Rockett was settled in 1846, making it one of the oldest settlements in Ellis County. Californian Scott Spear and his family were among the first settlers in the area. They chose a site along Red Oak Creek, southeast of the present-day community. Other families followed.

Originally known as Liberty, the name was changed to Rockett in 1852 after John Rockett, a pioneer settler in the area. The community continued to grow and the first post office in 1894. It remained in operation until January 2, 1907. By 1933, Rockett had an estimated population of 150 and two businesses.

As of 2000, there were approximately 124 people living in the community. In recent years, the building of several new subdivisions has brought more residents to the area. Despite its rural surroundings, Rockett (and all of Ellis County) is considered part of the Dallas–Fort Worth–Arlington Metropolitan Statistical Area.

== Rockett SUD ==
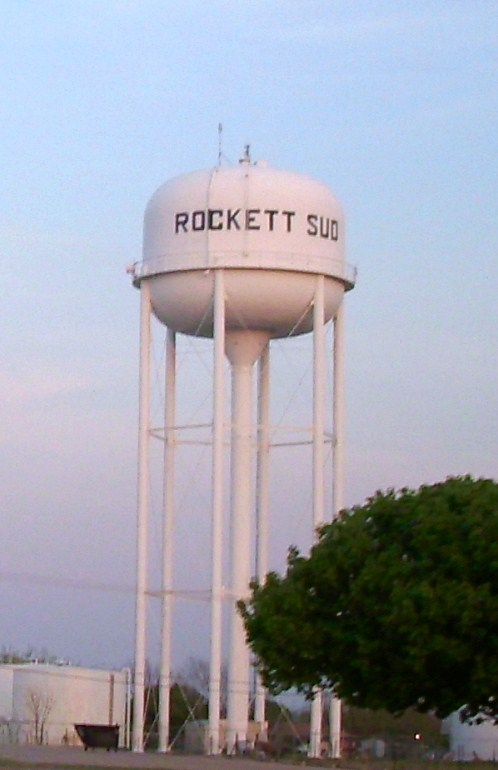
Rockett SUD water tower near the Waxahachie/Red Oak border

The Rockett Special Utility District (SUD) provides water services for the community of Rockett and surrounding rural areas in north central Ellis County as well as a very small portion of southern Dallas County. There are approximately 11,000 residents living in its service area.

It was established on January 29, 1965, as the Rockett Water Supply Corporation. The name was changed to the Skippy Rockett Utility District on November 21, 1989.

== Education ==
Being a dispersed, unincorporated community with no defined boundaries, portions of the Rockett area lie within three different Independent School Districts (ISDs). They are the Red Oak Independent School District, Ferris Independent School District, and the Palmer Independent School District.

== Cemeteries ==
There are four cemeteries that were established in Rockett during its early years. Those still in existence today include Andrews Cemetery, Graves Cemetery, Smith Cemetery, and Bells Chapel Cemetery (where many of the Rockett family are buried) – presently located within the city limits of Pecan Hill.
