= Red Oak High School (Texas) =

Location
- 220 State Highway 342; Red Oak, Texas 75154; United States; 32.50978°N 96.79995°W

Information
- School type: Public high school
- School district: Red Oak Independent School District
- Principal: Brett Haugh
- Teaching staff: 142.35 (FTE)
- Grades: 9-12
- Enrollment: 2,163 (2023–2024)
- Student to teacher ratio: 15.19
- Colors: Maroon & White
- Athletics conference: UIL Class AAAAAA
- Mascot: Hawk
- Website: rohs.redoakisd.org

Red Oak High School is a 6A high school located in Red Oak, Texas, United States. It is part of the Red Oak Independent School District located in far north central Ellis County. For the 2024-2025 school year, the school received an overall rating of "B" from the Texas Education Agency.

The Red Oak ISD has recently built a new facility for the school, located west and across the street from the current school. The new school also connects to nearby Texas State Highway 342, the main north-south highway through Red Oak. The North Texas Campus of Texas State Technical College is located adjacent to the school.

The district serves the majorities of the municipalities of Red Oak, Pecan Hill and Oak Leaf, along with some portions of Glenn Heights, Ovilla, and Waxahachie.

== Athletics ==
The Red Oak Hawks compete in the following sports -

Cross Country, Volleyball, Football, Basketball, Powerlifting, Soccer, Golf, Tennis, Track, Swimming, Baseball & Softball.

=== State titles ===
- Boys Soccer -
  - 2003(4A)
- Volleyball -
  - 1992(4A), 1995(4A), 2002(4A)
- One Act Play -
  - 1986(3A)

== Notable alumni ==
- Nikki Stringfield - American heavy metal singer and guitarist
- Louise Ritter - 1988 Olympic gold medalist, high jump
- Michelle Carter - National high school record holder in shot put, 2016 Olympic gold medalist
- Sarah Jaffe - Singer-songwriter signed to Kirtland Records
- Scott Walker - Judge of the Texas Court of Criminal Appeals
- Demi Burnett - The Bachelor contestant
- Marcus Sasser, professional basketball player for Detroit Pistons
