= Tim Hendrix =

American football player (born 1965)

No. 85
- Position: Tight end

Personal information
- Born: February 24, 1965 (age 61); DeSoto, Texas, U.S.
- Listed height: 6 ft 5 in (1.96 m)
- Listed weight: 241 lb (109 kg)

Career information
- High school: DeSoto
- College: Tennessee
- NFL draft: 1987: undrafted

Career history
- Chicago Bears (1987)*; Dallas Cowboys (1987)
- * Offseason or practice squad member only

Career NFL statistics
- Games played: 3
- Stats at Pro Football Reference

Timothy John Hendrix (born February 24, 1965) is an American former professional football player who was a tight end in the National Football League (NFL) for the Dallas Cowboys. He played college football for the Tennessee Volunteers.

== Early life ==
Hendrix attended DeSoto High School. As a senior, he received All-district honors at tight end. He committed to enroll at the University of Tennessee, along with his teammates Wesley Pryor, Troy Hale, and Brian Hunt.

He accepted a football scholarship from the University of Tennessee. As a freshman, he was listed as a second-team wide receiver, but played mostly as a backup tight end.

As a sophomore in 1984, he played mostly on special teams and short-yardage situations in three tight end alignments.

As a junior in 1985, he was the backup tight end behind Jeff Smith, posting three receptions for 38 yards and 2 touchdowns.

As a senior in 1986, he entered the season as the starting tight end, registering seven receptions for 107 yards. He finished his college career with 10 receptions for 145 yards and two touchdowns.

== Professional career ==
Hendrix was signed as an undrafted free agent by the Chicago Bears after the 1987 NFL draft on April 30. He was waived on August 27.

After the NFLPA strike was declared on the third week of the 1987 season, those contests were canceled (reducing the 16 game season to 15) and the NFL decided that the games would be played with replacement players. In September, he was signed to be a part of the Dallas Cowboys replacement team that was given the mock name "Rhinestone Cowboys" by the media. He was the backup tight end behind Rich Borresen and played mostly on the special teams units. He was released at the end of the strike on October 20.
