= DeSoto High School Freshman Campus =

Public school in DeSoto, Texas, U.S.

Location
- 620 South Westmoreland Street; DeSoto, Texas 75115; United States; 32.580396°N 96.870704°W

Information
- Type: Public high school
- Principal: Dr. Thurston B. Lamb
- Faculty: 45
- Grades: 9
- Enrollment: 749 (2014-2015)
- Color
- Team name: Eagles
- Website: Official website

DeSoto High School Freshman Campus is a public school in DeSoto, Texas, United States. It is part of the DeSoto Independent School District.

Located at 620 South Westmoreland Road, the school serves the district's ninth graders.

The Freshman Campus opened in 1997 to alleviate overcrowding at the high school. Although the campuses are connected to each other and share a common library, they are commonly treated as separate schools within the district.

The district, and therefore the school, most of DeSoto, the Dallas County portions of Glenn Heights, and a portion of Ovilla in Dallas County, as well as a small portion of Cedar Hill.

== Student demographics ==
As of the 2005–2006 school year, the Freshman Campus had a total of 809 students (74.8% African American, 10.8% White, 13.7% Hispanic, 0.6% Asian, and 0.1% Native American).

== School uniforms ==
In the 2005–2006 school year, DeSoto ISD began a mandatory school uniform policy at all of its schools.

== 2005-06 accountability rating ==
Based on the accountability ratings released by the Texas Education Agency on August 1, 2006, the Freshman Campus is currently rated "Academically Acceptable".
