= Boxcar Willie =

American singer (1931–1999)

Background information
- Also known as: Boxcar Willie
- Born: Lecil Travis Martin; September 1, 1931; Ovilla, Texas, U.S.
- Died: April 12, 1999 (aged 67) Branson, Missouri, U.S.
- Genres: Country; gospel
- Occupations: Musician; singer; songwriter
- Instruments: Vocals; guitar; train whistle
- Website: www.boxcarwillie.com
- Military career
- Allegiance: United States
- Branch: United States Air Force
- Service years: 1949–1976
- Rank: Master sergeant E7
- Conflicts: Korean War

Lecil Travis Martin (September 1, 1931 – April 12, 1999), whose stage name was Boxcar Willie, was an American country music singer-songwriter who sang in the "old-time hobo" music style, complete with overalls and a floppy hat. "Boxcar Willie" was originally a character in a ballad he wrote, but he later adopted it as his own stage name. His early musical career ran parallel to his service as an enlisted flight engineer in the United States Air Force.

== Biography ==
According to his birth record, Martin was born in Ovilla, Texas, to Birdie and Edna Mae Martin. He joined the U.S. Air Force in May 1949, and served as a flight engineer on the B-29 Superfortress during the Korean War in the early 1950s. In Lincoln, Nebraska, Martin was sitting at a railroad crossing and a man who closely resembled his chief boom operator, Willie Wilson, passed by sitting in a boxcar. He said, "There goes Willie." He pulled over and wrote a song titled "Boxcar Willie". It eventually became Martin's stage name. In 1962, Martin met his future wife, Lloene, in Boise, Idaho. They later had four children.

In San Jose, California, Martin attended a talent show as "Boxcar Willie" and performed under that stage name for the first time. He won first place and a $150 prize. Music remained a part-time pursuit, as he was still serving in the Air Force and flying daily missions. In the early 1970s, while assigned to the 136th Air Refueling Wing of the Texas Air National Guard, Martin served as a flight engineer aboard the Boeing KC-97 Stratofreighter and participated in Operation Creek Party. This operation provided critical in-flight refueling services for fighter aircraft assigned to the United States Air Forces in Europe for 10 years.

In 1976, Martin retired from the Air Force and became a full-time performer. One of his first national appearances was on Chuck Barris's The Gong Show, winning the talent contest in 1977. That same year, he was named Entertainer of the Year at the Grapevine Opry's third annual Susie Awards show, held at the Tarrant County Convention Center in Fort Worth, Texas.

Martin gained mainstream recognition in the United States through albums sold directly to the public via television commercials, which was a marketing approach also used to promote other artists with large followings in the United Kingdom and Europe, such as Slim Whitman and Gheorghe Zamfir. He went on to achieve commercial success in country music. In 1981, Martin was inducted into the Grand Ole Opry. He was also inducted into the Country Music Hall of Fame and Museum's Walkway of Stars that same year. He made a number of guest appearances on the American television variety show Hee Haw.

He also found success outside the United States, with his 1980 album King of the Road giving him his highest mainstream chart position, reaching number five in the UK Albums Chart. Traveling around the world with Martin's band was his steel guitar player Chubby Howard, a radio broadcaster and musician for many years.

In 1985, Martin moved to Branson, Missouri, and purchased a theater on Missouri Route 76, also known as 76 Country Boulevard. In addition to the Boxcar Willie Theater, he opened a museum and eventually had two motels, both bearing his name. Martin was one of the first commercially successful country singers to settle in Branson and claimed to be the first major entertainer to live and work there year-round, helping to establish the city as a destination for other high-profile entertainers. He performed at his theater in Branson until his death.

In 1992, Martin was featured on the season two premiere of the television series Tracks Ahead, which profiled him in Branson, Missouri. In 1995, Martin published his autobiography, Boxcar Willie: My Life Story. In 1997, Boxcar Willie was honored by the city of Branson, Missouri, with the naming of a street, Boxcar Willie Drive (map), which runs alongside the Branson Scenic Railway. The following year, he appeared on the television series Country's Family Reunion Two, where he performed "Life's Railway to Heaven". In 1999, Boxcar Willie made his final appearance on the Grand Ole Opry.

== Death ==
Martin was diagnosed with leukemia in 1996 and died on April 12, 1999, in Branson at the age of 67. He was buried at Ozarks Memorial Park in Branson. Major League Baseball umpire "Cowboy" Joe West was among his pallbearers.

== Legacy ==
After a major reconstruction project, the overpass carrying Farm to Market Road 664 (locally known as Ovilla Road) over Interstate 35E in Red Oak, Texas, was renamed the Boxcar Willie Memorial Overpass (map). A small park, two blocks from the National Mall, near the L'Enfant Plaza station in Washington, D.C., was renamed Boxcar Willie Park (map). Martin is still remembered by his nickname, "America's Favorite Hobo". One of his children, Larry Martin, has performed professionally under the stage name of Boxcar Willie Jr.

In 2016, his widow, Lloene Martin, released an 82-minute documentary film on DVD, Boxcar Willie, His Story, covering the life of the country singer-songwriter.

In January 2023, two of his children, Larry Martin and Lorrie Brown, gave a presentation about their father's life and legacy at the Branson Centennial Museum.

In May 2024, Martin was honored with a star on the city of Waxahachie's downtown Walk of Fame, located on the sidewalk at the corner of Main and Rogers streets (map).

== Discography ==
=== Albums ===
Year	Album	Chart Positions				Label
Year	Album	US Country	AUS	CAN	UK	Label
1976	Boxcar Willie	—	—	—	—	Column One
1978	Daddy Was a Railroad Man	—	—	—	—	Column One
1979	Boxcar Willie Sings Hank Williams and Jimmie Rodgers	—	—	—	—	Column One
1980	Take Me Home	—	—	—	—	Column One
1980	Greatest Hits – Boxcar Willie	—	—	—	—	
1981	King of the Road (Released in the UK in 1980) (Note: King of the Road peaked at number five on the UK Official Albums Chart in July 1980 following its UK release via Warwick Records, prior to its 1981 North American release.)	54	40	35	5	Warwick Records (UK) / Main Street (US)
1982	Last Train to Heaven (featuring Lee Gentry)	27	—	—	—	Main Street
1982	Best of Boxcar, Vol. 1	34	—	—	—	Main Street
1983	...Not the Man I Used to Be	35	—	—	—	Main Street
1984	Live in Concert	—	—	—	—	Hallmark Recordings
1985	Falling in Love	—	—	—	—	Heartland Productions, Inc.
1986	20 All Time Favourites	—	86	—	—	J&B Records
1986	Boxcar Willie	—	—	—	—	Dot Records
1987	The Collection	—	—	—	—	Castle Music Ltd.
1988	Live at Wembley	—	—	—	—	Pickwick Records
1989	Best Loved Favorites	—	—	—	—	Ranwood Records
1991	Pure Country Magic	—	—	—	—	Heartland Music
1991	Truck Driving Favorites	—	—	—	—	Madacy Entertainment
1993	Rocky Box: Rockabilly (with the Skeletons)	—	—	—	—	K-Tel Records
1994	The Spirit of America	—	—	—	—	Madacy Entertainment
1996	Christmas with Boxcar Willie	—	—	—	—	Laserlight
1996	Achy Breaky Heart	—	—	—	—	Madacy
1996	How Great Thou Art	—	—	—	—	Madacy
2004	American Songs – The Very Best of Johnny Cash & Boxcar Willie	—	—	—	—	Retro Records

=== Singles ===
Year	Single	Chart Positions		Album
Year	Single	US Country	CAN Country	Album
1980	"Train Medley"	95	—	Take Me Home
1982	"Bad News"	36	15	Last Train to Heaven
1982	"We Made Memories" (with Penny DeHaven)	77	—	Last Train to Heaven
1982	"Last Train to Heaven"	80	—	Last Train to Heaven
1982	"Keep on Rollin' Down the Line"	70	—	Last Train to Heaven
1983	"Country Music Nightmare"	76	—	Best of Boxcar, Vol. 1
1983	"Train Medley" (re-release)	61	—	Best of Boxcar, Vol. 1
1983	"The Man I Used to Be"	44	—	...Not the Man I Used to Be
1984	"Not on the Bottom Yet"	87	—	...Not the Man I Used to Be
1984	"Luther"	69	—	...Not the Man I Used to Be

== Awards and nominations ==
Year	Organization	Award	Nominee/Work	Result
1981	Music City News Country Awards	Most Promising Male Artist	Boxcar Willie	Won
1981	Country Music Association Awards	Horizon Award	Boxcar Willie	Nominated

== Sources ==
- Trott, Walt (1998). "Boxcar Willie". In The Encyclopedia of Country Music. Paul Kingsbury, Editor. New York: Oxford University Press. p. 47.
