= Jimmy Wyrick =

American football player (born 1976)

No. 35, 27, 25
- Position: Cornerback

Personal information
- Born: December 31, 1976 (age 49); Antioch, California, U.S.
- Listed height: 5 ft 9 in (1.75 m)
- Listed weight: 176 lb (80 kg)

Career information
- High school: DeSoto (DeSoto, Texas)
- College: Minnesota (1996–1999)
- NFL draft: 2000: undrafted

Career history
- Detroit Lions (2000–2003); Miami Dolphins (2003–2004)

Career NFL statistics
- Total tackles: 84
- Passes deflected: 4
- Forced fumbles: 1
- Fumble recoveries: 1
- Stats at Pro Football Reference

Jimmy Ray Wyrick (born December 31, 1976) is an American former professional football player who was a cornerback in the National Football League (NFL). He played college football for the Minnesota Golden Gophers.

Born in Antioch, California, Wyrick grew up in DeSoto, Texas and graduated from DeSoto High School in 1995. At the University of Minnesota, Wyrick redshirted his true freshman season, played at wide receiver for the Minnesota Golden Gophers in 1996, before switching to cornerback for his last two seasons in 1997 and 1999. He sat out the 1998 season due to a foot injury.

He was signed by the Detroit Lions as an undrafted free agent in 2000 and played for the Lions from 2000 to 2003. Wyrick also played for the Miami Dolphins from 2003 to 2004.

After retiring from football, Wyrick became a firefighter and paramedic with the Dallas Fire-Rescue Department.
