= Ovilla, Texas =

- City
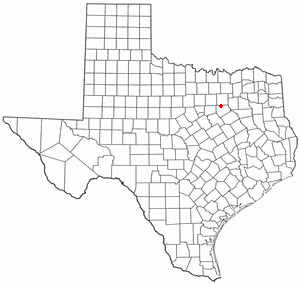
- Location of Ovilla, Texas

- Coordinates: 32°31′54″N 96°53′09″W
- Country: United States
- State: Texas
- Counties: Ellis, Dallas

Area
  - Total: 5.79 sq mi (14.99 km^{2})
  - Land: 5.79 sq mi (14.99 km^{2})
  - Water: 0.0039 sq mi (0.01 km^{2})
- Elevation: 669 ft (204 m)

Population (2020)
  - Total: 4,304
  - Density: 720.1/sq mi (278.05/km^{2})
- Time zone: UTC-6 (Central (CST))
  - Summer (DST): UTC-5 (CDT)
- ZIP code: 75154
- Area codes: 214, 469, 945, 972
- FIPS code: 48-54444
- GNIS feature ID: 2411344
- Website: www.cityofovilla.org

Ovilla is a city in Dallas and Ellis Counties in the U.S. state of Texas. Its population was 4,304 at the 2020 census.

== History ==
=== Original settlement ===
Ovilla, on upper Red Oak Creek in northern Ellis County, is the oldest town in the county. It began in 1844 as a fortified settlement known as McNamara's to repel Indian incursions. James McNamara arrived in 1843 with his new wife, Joanna (Hale) McNamara as the first Peters Colony settlers of this area for which they received 640 acres that made up the beginning of the locale that was later to be called 'Shiloh' for a nearby creek and a newly formed church. The McNamaras arrived with other Peters colonists: the Billingsleys; Mrs. McNamara's family, the McCommases; and James Sterrett (Mrs. McNamara's brother-in-law, who established Sterrett, Texas). The marriage of James Sterrett to Clarinda (Hale) Squires of 7 July 1844 was the first marriage to be performed within the future boundaries of Ellis County, which was still within old Robertson County at the time. James McNamara served as sergeant in Smith's Company of Texas Mounted Volunteers during the War with Mexico in 1846–1847 along with his brother-in-law, James Sterrett. The little village grew as other Peters Colony settlers arrived in the area to attend brush arbor meetings of the Shiloh Cumberland Presbyterian Church, which was started by Rev. Finis E. King in 1847. James McNamara died in New Orleans on 5 May 1852, and his widow liquefied his assets and left Texas for the gold fields in Tuolumne County, California, with all of her remaining maternal family members.

=== First public buildings ===
The church met in a brush arbor until 1853, when a log cabin, which served as both church and schoolhouse, was built. A frame church building was finished in 1872; in 1984, about 190 members still met in the structure, which had been enlarged and remodeled. The church was instrumental in moving Trinity University to Waxahachie in 1902 and in establishing a girls' school in the nearby town of Milford.

=== 20th century breakthrough ===
Although Ovilla was a thriving farming community by the 1850s, it remained unnamed. Mrs. M. M. Molloy, wife of Rev. D. G. Molloy, formed the name from the Spanish word villa. Ovilla continued to grow, and by the early 1900s, had a post office, a bank, a cotton gin, a pharmacy, a blacksmith shop, and several dry-goods stores. Its post office closed in 1906. Fires in 1918 and 1926 destroyed most of the downtown buildings, and this destruction, together with the fact that Ovilla was bypassed by railroads and major highways, led to a decline in growth.

=== City incorporation ===
As Dallas grew, however, and people started moving from the city to the suburbs, Ovilla once again began to grow. To escape annexation by DeSoto or any other neighboring city, the town of Ovilla was incorporated in 1963. In the first census after incorporation, its population was 339; by 1980, it had risen to 1,067. Its 1984 population was estimated to be nearly 1,300. In 1990, it was 2,027, and the community had extended into Dallas County. The 2000 census showed a population of 3,405, rising to 3,492 as of the 2010 census.

=== Famous history ===
Boxcar Willie was born in the area surrounding Ovilla; the overpass at Interstate 35E and FM 664 in Red Oak is named in his memory.

Several episodes of Walker, Texas Ranger with Chuck Norris were shot in part here. Downtown Ovilla was the set of an old Indian town.

== Geography ==
According to the United States Census Bureau, the city has a total area of 5.7 square miles (14.8 km^{2}), all land.

== Demographics ==
Historical population
Census	Pop.	Note	%±
1970	339		—
1980	1,067		214.7%
1990	2,027		90.0%
2000	3,405		68.0%
2010	3,492		2.6%
2020	4,304		23.3%
2023 (est.)	4,709		9.4%
U.S. Decennial Census

=== 2020 census ===
As of the 2020 census, Ovilla had a population of 4,304, 1,554 households, and 1,238 families. The median age was 47.3 years, 21.5% of residents were under the age of 18, 21.1% of residents were 65 years of age or older, and there were 94.3 males for every 100 females overall and 92.6 males for every 100 females age 18 and over.

90.2% of residents lived in urban areas, while 9.8% lived in rural areas.

There were 1,554 households in Ovilla, of which 33.4% had children under the age of 18 living in them. Of all households, 72.3% were married-couple households, 7.9% were households with a male householder and no spouse or partner present, and 16.4% were households with a female householder and no spouse or partner present. About 13.1% of all households were made up of individuals and 7.7% had someone living alone who was 65 years of age or older.

There were 1,597 housing units, of which 2.7% were vacant. The homeowner vacancy rate was 1.0% and the rental vacancy rate was 5.6%.

Racial composition as of the 2020 census
Race	Number	Percent
White	2,912	67.7%
Black or African American	655	15.2%
American Indian and Alaska Native	27	0.6%
Asian	49	1.1%
Native Hawaiian and Other Pacific Islander	3	0.1%
Some other race	206	4.8%
Two or more races	452	10.5%
Hispanic or Latino (of any race)	632	14.7%

== Education ==
Most areas in Ovilla in Ellis County are in the Red Oak Independent School District, with some portions in the Midlothian Independent School District. The Dallas County portions are divided between the Cedar Hill Independent School District and the DeSoto Independent School District.

Zoned schools are:

- Red Oak High School for the Red Oak ISD portion
- McClatchey Elementary School, Walnut Grove Middle School, and Midlothian Heritage High School for the Midlothian ISD portion.
- Cedar Hill High School for the Cedar Hill ISD portion
- Cockrell Hill Elementary School (grades Kindergarten through 2), Frank Moates Elementary School (grades 3-5), Curtistene S. McCowan Middle School, DeSoto High School Freshman Campus, and DeSoto High School for the DeSoto ISD portion

Ovilla Christian School, a private Christian school, is located in Ovilla. It is associated with Ovilla Road Baptist Church.

Portions in Ellis County are zoned to Navarro College. Portions in Dallas County are zoned to Dallas College.
