= Moe Craddock =

American politician

N.L. "Moe" Craddock (1934 – March 4, 2008) was an American firefighter who helped create the city of Glenn Heights, Texas (USA).

Craddock grew up in Lancaster, where he graduated from high school in 1953.

He worked several jobs, including for three years as a lineman for Dallas Power & Light, before joining the Dallas Fire Department in 1958. He served as a firefighter and engineer driver before becoming the driver for the chief at station No. 36 in West Dallas.

It was while still with the fire department, that Craddock opened a 30-acre (120,000 m^{2}) mobile home park. This precipitated his civic interests in the area. He helped push for the incorporation of Glenn Heights in the late 1960s to prevent his business from being annexed by the neighboring city of DeSoto. The city was incorporated on September 16, 1969.

Craddock became active in city politics, first as a city council member between 1972 and 1975, then in 1984-85 and 1988. He served as the city's mayor in 1985 and was elected to that office in 1988, 1990 and 1992.

After retirement, he served on the boards of directors of HILCO Electric Cooperative, which led to board positions with Brazos Electric Cooperative Inc. and San Miguel Electric Cooperative Inc. He is also credited with helping found the Bank of DeSoto, of which he was director.

He was married to Sylvia Craddock. The couple had one son and two daughters.

Craddock died March 4, 2008, at the age of 73. He was traveling aboard the M.S. Amsterdam cruise ship, which was off the coast of Vietnam, on his second around-the-world cruise, when he fell ill. According to The Dallas Morning News, he developed sepsis and died from complications from diabetes. He was buried in Trees Cemetery in Duncanville.

Two streets in the city of Glenn Heights, Craddock Drive and Craddock Circle, are named after him.
