= Oak Leaf, Texas =

- City
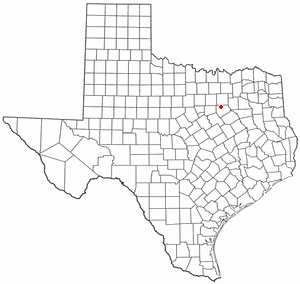
- Location of Oak Leaf, Texas

- Coordinates: 32°30′15″N 96°51′52″W
- Country: United States
- State: Texas
- County: Ellis

Area
  - Total: 2.37 sq mi (6.13 km^{2})
  - Land: 2.36 sq mi (6.12 km^{2})
  - Water: 0.0039 sq mi (0.01 km^{2})
- Elevation: 643 ft (196 m)

Population (2020)
  - Total: 1,552
  - Density: 627.6/sq mi (242.33/km^{2})
- Time zone: UTC-6 (Central (CST))
  - Summer (DST): UTC-5 (CDT)
- ZIP code: 75154
- Area codes: 214, 469, 945, 972
- FIPS code: 48-53115
- GNIS feature ID: 2411288
- Website: www.oakleaftexas.org

Oak Leaf is a city in Ellis County, Texas, United States. The population was 1,552 at the 2020 census.

== Geography ==
Oak Leaf is located in northern Ellis County and is bordered to the northwest by Ovilla, to the north by Glenn Heights, and to the east by Red Oak. Waxahachie, the county seat, is 11 miles (18 km) to the south, and downtown Dallas is 20 miles (32 km) to the north.

According to the United States Census Bureau, the city has a total area of 2.4 square miles (6.1 km^{2}), of which 1.572 acres (6,362 m^{2}), or 0.10%, is water.

== Demographics ==
Historical population
Census	Pop.	Note	%±
1990	984		—
2000	1,209		22.9%
2010	1,298		7.4%
2020	1,552		19.6%
U.S. Decennial Census

=== 2020 census ===
As of the 2020 census, Oak Leaf had a population of 1,552, with 520 households and 514 families residing in the city. The median age was 45.9 years.

The age distribution showed 22.7% of residents under the age of 18 and 21.6% 65 years of age or older, while for every 100 females there were 104.7 males and for every 100 females age 18 and over there were 97.4 males age 18 and over.

80.0% of residents lived in urban areas, while 20.0% lived in rural areas.

There were 520 households in Oak Leaf, of which 34.8% had children under the age of 18 living in them. Of all households, 71.3% were married-couple households, 9.8% were households with a male householder and no spouse or partner present, and 15.8% were households with a female householder and no spouse or partner present. About 10.1% of all households were made up of individuals and 5.0% had someone living alone who was 65 years of age or older.

There were 546 housing units, of which 4.8% were vacant. The homeowner vacancy rate was 0.8% and the rental vacancy rate was 7.7%.

Racial composition as of the 2020 census (Note: Note: the US Census treats Hispanic/Latino as an ethnic category. This table excludes Latinos from the racial categories and assigns them to a separate category. Hispanics/Latinos can be of any race.)
Race	Number	Percent
White	1,020	65.7%
Black or African American	219	14.1%
American Indian and Alaska Native	12	0.8%
Asian	23	1.5%
Native Hawaiian and Other Pacific Islander	1	0.1%
Some other race	103	6.6%
Two or more races	174	11.2%
Hispanic or Latino (of any race)	256	16.5%

== Education ==
The city of Oak Leaf is served by the Red Oak Independent School District.
