= Xavier Newman-Johnson =

American football player (born 1999)

No. 64 – New England Patriots
- Position: Guard
- Roster status: Practice squad

Personal information
- Born: August 4, 1999 (age 27); DeSoto, Texas, U.S.
- Listed height: 6 ft 2 in (1.88 m)
- Listed weight: 297 lb (135 kg)

Career information
- High school: DeSoto
- College: Baylor (2017–2021)
- NFL draft: 2022: undrafted

Career history
- Tennessee Titans (2022–2023); New York Jets (2023–2026); New England Patriots (2026–present)

Career NFL statistics as of 2026
- Games played: 26
- Games started: 5
- Stats at Pro Football Reference

Xavier Newman-Johnson (born Xavier Newman; August 4, 1999) is an American professional football guard for the New England Patriots of the National Football League (NFL). He played college football for the Baylor Bears and was signed by the Tennessee Titans as an undrafted free agent in 2022.

== Early life ==
Newman-Johnson was born on August 4, 1999, in DeSoto, Texas. He attended DeSoto High School and was an All-American and all-state selection in football. He was ranked among the top 300 best recruits nationally by ESPN and helped his team average 540 offensive yards-per-game as a senior. Newman-Johnson initially committed to play college football at Texas.

Newman-Johnson later flipped his commitment to Colorado, then to Baylor. As a true freshman at Baylor, he appeared in 11 games, starting eight as a left guard. The following season, Newman-Johnson started three games at left guard and appeared in a further four. As a junior, he started eight games at right guard and appeared in a total of 10. In his senior season, he appeared in five games, starting four, three of which came at left guard and the remaining one at center.

After being given an extra year of eligibility due to the COVID-19 pandemic, Newman-Johnson opted to return to Baylor in 2021 for a fifth season. That year, he started all 14 games at left guard and helped the team average 219.3 rushing yards per-game, which placed 10th in the nation. He was an honorable mention all-conference selection and finished his college career with 47 games played and 37 starts.

== Professional career ==
Pre-draft measurables
Height	Weight	Arm length	Hand span	Wingspan	40-yard dash	10-yard split	20-yard split	20-yard shuttle	Three-cone drill	Vertical jump	Bench press
6 ft 1 7/8 in (1.88 m)	297 lb (135 kg)	33 1/4 in (0.84 m)	9 3/4 in (0.25 m)	6 ft 7 3/4 in (2.03 m)	5.13 s	1.72 s	2.95 s	4.75 s	8.32 s	27.0 in (0.69 m)	23 reps
All values from Pro Day

=== Tennessee Titans ===
After going unselected in the 2022 NFL draft, Newman-Johnson was signed by the Tennessee Titans as an undrafted free agent. He was waived at the final roster cuts, but was subsequently brought back to the practice squad. Newman-Johnson was signed to the active roster on December 23, and made his NFL debut six days later against the Dallas Cowboys.

Newman made the Titans' final roster in 2023. He was waived on October 2, 2023.

=== New York Jets ===
On October 5, 2023, Newman was signed to the New York Jets' practice squad. He played both guard and center for the Jets on October 29 against the New York Giants. He was signed to the active roster on November 23. He was waived on December 2 and re-signed to the practice squad. He was signed back to the active roster on December 16.

On October 20, 2024, Newman suffered a high-impact hit during a game against the Pittsburgh Steelers, and as he began to walk back to the Jets team bench, he collapsed on the Jets sideline. He was conscious, but unable to move his body after being loaded on to the gurney. He was taken to a local hospital for further evaluation. It was reported later in the game that Newman had regained some movement in his limbs after he squeezed the hand of one of the athletic trainers as he was leaving for the hospital. The next day, Newman was released from the hospital after his tests came back negative for major injury and was able to return to the Jets following their 37-15 loss to the Steelers.

On April 2, 2025, Newman re-signed with the Jets. He made five appearances for New York during the regular season. On January 3, 2026, Newman-Johnson was placed on season-ending injured reserve due to a knee injury.

On March 12, 2026, Newman-Johnson re-signed with the Jets. Newman-Johnson was released by the Jets as a part of final roster cuts on August 30; he was re-signed to the team's practice squad the following day. He was released by the Jets on September 15.

=== New England Patriots ===
On September 17, 2026, Newman-Johnson signed with the New England Patriots' practice squad. On October 22, he was signed to their active roster. He reverted to their practice squad he next day.
