= DeSoto High School (Texas) =

Public secondary school in DeSoto, Texas, United States

DeSoto School

Location
- 600 Eagle Drive; DeSoto, Dallas, Texas 75115; United States; 32.580999°N 96.869616°W

Information
- Type: Comprehensive public high school
- Established: 1956
- School district: DeSoto Independent School District
- Principal: Monica Smith
- Teaching staff: 125.97 (FTE)
- Grades: 9–12
- Gender: Co-Educational
- Enrollment: 2,045 (2023–2024)
- Student to teacher ratio: 16.23
- Campus type: Suburban
- Colors: Green and Gold
- Athletics conference: University Interscholastic League (UIL); 5A district
- Mascot: Eagle
- Team name: Eagles
- Rivals: Cedar Hill, Duncanville
- Website: desotohs.desotoisd.org

DeSoto High School is a four-year comprehensive public high school in DeSoto, Texas, United States. It is part of the DeSoto Independent School District and is classified as a 5A school by the UIL. In 2015, the school was rated "Met Standard" by the Texas Education Agency.

The district, and therefore the school, serves most of DeSoto and the Dallas County portion of Glenn Heights, and a portion of Ovilla in Dallas County, as well as a small portion of Cedar Hill.

== School profile ==
From 1956 to 1962, DeSoto High School was located at 200 East Belt Line Road. In 1962, a new campus opened at 601 East Belt Line Road (present-day DeSoto East Junior High). As the district continued to grow, voters approved a $7.5 million bond by a vote of 445–366 in 1973 that contained a provision for the construction of a new high school.

On February 15, 1974, a groundbreaking ceremony took place at the new site, 600 Eagle Drive. The building contract was awarded to Central Texas Construction of Terrell at a cost of approximately $3,100,000. The school opened on August 16, 1976.

To relieve overcrowding, an adjoining Freshman Campus opened in 1997 to serve the district's ninth graders.

In 2011 The Dallas Morning News reported that the school "had a lower-than-expected college readiness percentage." In 2011, the district built additions to improve the school's college and career academies. The State of Texas defined "college readiness," or readiness to undergo university studies, by scores on the ACT, SAT, and 11th grade Texas Assessment of Knowledge and Skills (TAKS) tests.

DeSoto High offers International Baccalaureate, early college, and academic magnet programs to better serve the academic needs of its high-achieving students preparing to attend college.

== School uniforms ==
In the 2005–2006 school year, DeSoto ISD began a mandatory school uniform policy at all of its schools. Formerly, the mandatory uniform was:

- Shirt - yellow, green, black, white, or gray
- Pants - khaki or black
- On Fridays, a DeSoto or college shirt may be worn with jeans.

In 2019, DeSoto ISD changed the policy and the students no longer have to wear uniforms.

== Student demographics ==
In the 2014–2015 school year, DeSoto High had a total of 2,238 students in grades 10-12 (82% Foundational Black American, 3% White, 14% Hispanic, 0.2% Asian, and 0.2% Native American).

== Athletics ==
The DeSoto Eagles compete in the following sports:

- Baseball
- Basketball
- Cross country
- Football
- Golf
- Soccer
- Softball
- Swimming and diving
- Tennis
- Track and field
- Volleyball
- Band
- Cheerleading
- Wrestling

=== State championships ===
The DeSoto Baseball team won State Championships in 1979 and 1985.

The Lady Eagle track and field team won a State Championship in 2007 followed by three consecutive State Championships in 2011, 2012, and 2013. They also won 5 straight titles in 2016, 2017, 2018, 2019 and 2021 bringing their total to 9 State Championships.

The Eagle Boys' Track and Field team won State Titles in 2012 and 2016.

The Boys' Basketball team won the Texas 5A State Championship in 2003 and 2009. In 2016, the boys' team won the 6A State Championship, upsetting #1 ranked Atacostia High 73–54.

In 2016, the Varsity Football team won the 6A Division II State Championship in the AT&T Stadium. This was the first State Football Championship in school history. DeSoto won the State Championship again in 2022, 2023, & 2025, winning 3 championships in 4 years.

In 2021, the Varsity Girls Basketball team won the Texas 6A State Championship over an undefeated Cypress Creek High School (Texas). This was the first Girls State Basketball Championship in school history. In 2022, the Girls Basketball team would win a repeat championship title bringing their total to two state titles.

=== Rivalry ===
For decades, DeSoto High has maintained a popular rivalry against their regional foe the Cedar Hill High School Longhorns. The rivalry has been deemed the "Battle of Belt Line". DeSoto has an even longer rivalry with Duncanville High School.

The earliest DHS rivalry was with Lancaster High School, DeSoto on the West and Lancaster to the East of Interstate 35. Pranks against each other in the 70's-80's included: Live goats tied to front door of school, and paint dumped atop the bronze eagle statue that sits in front of the building.

=== Marching band ===
DeSoto Eagle Band is a 90+ music group that represents the school at athletic games, band competitions, parades, and other events.

== Student Investigation Award ==
In January 2005, the school district was investigated by the press for its questionable hiring of an outside "gang consultant". The investigation focused on whether the district truly had a "gang problem" (the local police chief said it did not), or whether the consultant was creating the "problem", since the consultant stood to gain a sizeable contract if in fact a problem existed. The result is that there was no real gang problem, and the consultant's contract was terminated.

The unique feature of the investigation was that none of the media outlets in the Dallas area had anything to do with it. The investigation was performed solely by the Eagle Eye, the DHS student newspaper. For their role in the story, four members of the newspaper staff received the Courage in Student Journalism Award for their work; the student advisor received the educator's version of the award. Both awards came with $5,000 prizes.

== Notable alumni ==
- Tim Hendrix (1983), former NFL tight end
- Steve Foster (1985), former MLB pitcher and coach
- Mike Humphreys (1985), retired MLB outfielder
- Will Brunson (1988), former MLB pitcher
- Jason London (1991), actor
- Jeremy London (1991), actor
- Byron Hanspard (1994), former NFL running back
- Jimmy Wyrick (1995), former NFL cornerback
- Patrick Crayton (1997), former NFL wide receiver
- Tatum Bell (1999), former NFL running back
- Casey Printers (1999), former NFL quarterback
- Marcus Tubbs (1999), former NFL defensive tackle
- Ellis Hobbs (2001), former NFL cornerback
- Mark Simmons (2002), former NFL wide receiver
- Trey Gilder (2003), former NBA player
- Patrick Williams (2004), former NFL wide receiver
- Brian Jackson (2005), former NFL cornerback
- Mike Thomas (2005), former NFL wide receiver
- Jermaine Beal (2006), former basketball player who played overseas
- Von Miller (2007), former NFL All-Pro linebacker
- Sydney Carter (2008), former WNBA player
- Cyrus Gray (2008), former NFL running back
- Tony Jerod-Eddie (2008), former NFL nose tackle
- Trevis Turner (2008), former NFL offensive lineman
- Gary Talton (2009), basketball player who played overseas
- Marcus Murphy (2010), former NFL running back
- Zach Orr (2010), Defensive Coordinator for the Baltimore Ravens, former NFL linebacker
- Jalen Mills (2012), NFL cornerback
- Raheem Wilson (2012), football cornerback who plays overseas
- Matt Jones (2013), former basketball player who played overseas
- Chris Lacy (2014), former NFL wide receiver
- Nick Orr (2014), former NFL safety
- Howard Wilson (2014), former NFL cornerback
- Chris Orr (2015), former NFL linebacker, currently a coach for the Kansas City Chiefs
- James Proche (2015), wide receiver for the Tennessee Titans
- Marques Bolden (2016), Israeli Basketball Premier League player; formerly NBA player
- A.J. Green (2016), cornerback for the Miami Dolphins
- Erica Banks (2017), rapper
- Ed Ingram (2017), offensive lineman for the Houston Texans
- Xavier Newman-Johnson (2017), offensive lineman for the New York Jets
- Laviska Shenault (2017), wide receiver for the Buffalo Bills
- Gemon Green (2018), NFL cornerback
- Feron Hunt (2018), NBA player
- DeVere Levelston (2019), defensive end for the Memphis Showboats
- Lawrence Arnold (2020), wide receiver for the Kansas Jayhawks
- Rosey Effiong (2020), track and field athlete, world record holder in the Mixed 4 × 400 metres relay
- Jabbar Muhammad (2020), cornerback for the Jacksonville Jaguars
- Ar'maj Reed-Adams (2020), offensive guard for the Buffalo Bills
- Jerand Bradley (2021), wide receiver for the Los Angeles Chargers
- Byron Murphy II (2021), defensive tackle for the Seattle Seahawks
- Shemar Turner (2021), defensive tackle for the Chicago Bears
- Johntay Cook II (2023), wide receiver for the Ole Miss Rebels
- Quintrevion Wisner (2023), running back for the Florida State Seminoles
- Boobie Feaster (class of 2026), wide receiver for the USC Trojans
