= Ferris, Texas =

- City
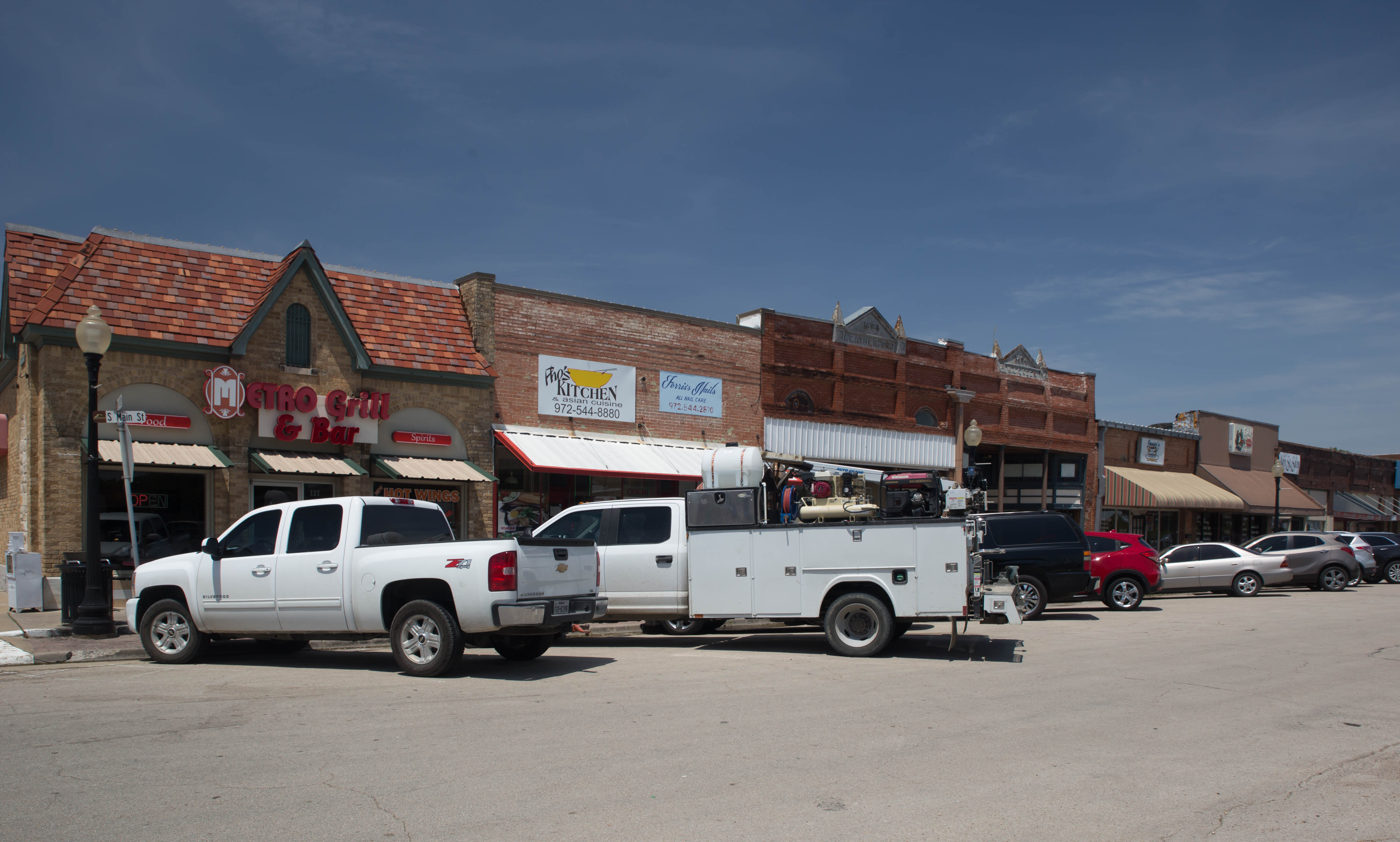
- Downtown Ferris, Texas

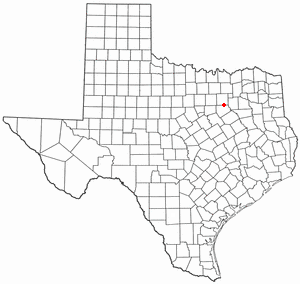
- Location of Ferris, Texas

- Coordinates: 32°32′13″N 96°40′26″W
- Country: United States
- State: Texas
- Counties: Ellis, Dallas

Area
  - Total: 4.78 sq mi (12.37 km^{2})
  - Land: 4.64 sq mi (12.01 km^{2})
  - Water: 0.14 sq mi (0.37 km^{2})
- Elevation: 456 ft (139 m)

Population (2020)
  - Total: 2,788
  - Estimate (2025): 4,291
  - Density: 601.2/sq mi (232.1/km^{2})
- Time zone: UTC-6 (Central (CST))
  - Summer (DST): UTC-5 (CDT)
- ZIP code: 75125
- Area codes: 214, 469, 945, 972
- FIPS code: 48-25752
- GNIS feature ID: 2410500
- Website: www.ferristexas.gov

Ferris is a city in Dallas and Ellis counties in the U.S. state of Texas. It is 20 miles (32 km) south of downtown Dallas. The population has risen dramatically from 2,788 in 2020 to an estimated 4,291 in 2025.

== History ==
Settlement of the area began in the early 1870s. On September 28, 1874, a local family deeded approximately 100 acres (0.40 km^{2}) of land to four trustees for the establishment of a town and railway station. Judge Justus Wesley Ferris of Waxahachie handled the transaction, and the community was named for him. Within ten years, Ferris had a population of 300 with a post office, gristmills, cotton gins, four churches, and a school.

On September 18, 1882, an election was held to incorporate the community. A total of 47 votes were cast, 34 (72%) in favor of incorporation and 13 (28%) against. The results were verified by the Ellis County Judge on September 30, and Ferris officially became a town. By 1900, the town was home to 904 residents. In 1910, that number had increased to 1,233 residents.

Fifty businesses, including six brick plants that benefitted from the area's mineral rich soil, were operating in 1914. The population rose to 1,586 by 1925 but declined during the 1930s and 1940s as a result of the Great Depression and World War II.

Ferris thrived during the early post-war years. Four brick plants operated during the 1950s, and the community was known locally as the "Brick Capital of the Nation". Ferris also has a second nickname – "The City that Bricked the World" – which is still commonly used to date. In 1952, the population had risen to 1,734 and 1,807 by 1964. The Ferris Annual Brick Festival is held every year at the end of April.

The expansion of the Dallas–Fort Worth Metropolitan Area and the construction of Interstate 45 aided the growth of Ferris in the latter half of the twentieth century. Although the number of businesses decreased during the 1980s, the population continued to grow. It stood at 2,212 in 1990, 2,175 in 2000, and 2,436 in 2010. In 1994, Ferris won the 3-A State Championship in men's basketball.

== Geography ==
According to the United States Census Bureau, the city has a total area of 4.8 square miles (12.4 km^{2}), of which 4.6 square miles (12.0 km^{2}) is land and 0.15 square miles (0.4 km^{2}) is water. Most of the city lies within Ellis County, with only a small portion in Dallas County.

=== Climate ===
According to the Köppen Climate Classification system, Ferris has a humid subtropical climate, abbreviated "Cfa" on climate maps. The hottest temperature recorded in Ferris was 112 °F (44.4 °C) on July 18/20, 2022, while the coldest temperature recorded was −1 °F (−18.3 °C) on December 22, 1989, and February 15–16, 2021.

Climate data for Ferris, Texas, 1991–2020 normals, extremes 1962–present
Month	Jan	Feb	Mar	Apr	May	Jun	Jul	Aug	Sep	Oct	Nov	Dec	Year
Record high °F (°C)	84 (29)	96 (36)	94 (34)	100 (38)	102 (39)	110 (43)	112 (44)	111 (44)	111 (44)	99 (37)	92 (33)	87 (31)	112 (44)
Mean maximum °F (°C)	76.4 (24.7)	80.8 (27.1)	84.2 (29.0)	88.3 (31.3)	93.2 (34.0)	97.8 (36.6)	103.0 (39.4)	103.8 (39.9)	99.2 (37.3)	92.8 (33.8)	83.0 (28.3)	77.6 (25.3)	104.8 (40.4)
Mean daily maximum °F (°C)	57.5 (14.2)	61.7 (16.5)	69.0 (20.6)	76.6 (24.8)	83.8 (28.8)	91.5 (33.1)	95.9 (35.5)	96.5 (35.8)	90.0 (32.2)	79.5 (26.4)	67.2 (19.6)	58.7 (14.8)	77.3 (25.2)
Daily mean °F (°C)	46.5 (8.1)	50.3 (10.2)	57.2 (14.0)	65.0 (18.3)	73.5 (23.1)	81.1 (27.3)	84.7 (29.3)	84.9 (29.4)	78.1 (25.6)	67.2 (19.6)	55.9 (13.3)	47.8 (8.8)	66.0 (18.9)
Mean daily minimum °F (°C)	35.6 (2.0)	38.8 (3.8)	45.4 (7.4)	53.3 (11.8)	63.2 (17.3)	70.7 (21.5)	73.5 (23.1)	73.3 (22.9)	66.2 (19.0)	55.0 (12.8)	44.6 (7.0)	36.8 (2.7)	54.7 (12.6)
Mean minimum °F (°C)	20.8 (−6.2)	24.9 (−3.9)	28.4 (−2.0)	38.5 (3.6)	48.4 (9.1)	61.1 (16.2)	67.2 (19.6)	66.4 (19.1)	53.4 (11.9)	38.5 (3.6)	27.7 (−2.4)	22.9 (−5.1)	17.6 (−8.0)
Record low °F (°C)	3 (−16)	−1 (−18)	14 (−10)	29 (−2)	38 (3)	53 (12)	55 (13)	50 (10)	42 (6)	26 (−3)	16 (−9)	−1 (−18)	−1 (−18)
Average precipitation inches (mm)	2.96 (75)	3.08 (78)	4.00 (102)	3.85 (98)	4.34 (110)	3.95 (100)	1.98 (50)	2.81 (71)	2.69 (68)	4.86 (123)	2.84 (72)	3.51 (89)	40.87 (1,036)
Average snowfall inches (cm)	0.1 (0.25)	0.2 (0.51)	0.0 (0.0)	0.0 (0.0)	0.0 (0.0)	0.0 (0.0)	0.0 (0.0)	0.0 (0.0)	0.0 (0.0)	0.0 (0.0)	0.1 (0.25)	0.1 (0.25)	0.5 (1.26)
Average precipitation days (≥ 0.01 in)	5.6	5.8	6.3	5.5	6.6	5.1	3.5	4.3	4.3	5.5	4.9	5.3	62.7
Average snowy days (≥ 0.1 in)	0.1	0.2	0.0	0.0	0.0	0.0	0.0	0.0	0.0	0.0	0.1	0.1	0.5
Source 1: NOAA
Source 2: National Weather Service

== Demographics ==
Historical population
Census	Pop.	Note	%±
1880	106		—
1890	311		193.4%
1900	904		190.7%
1910	1,233		36.4%
1920	1,586		28.6%
1930	1,438		−9.3%
1940	1,436		−0.1%
1950	1,735		20.8%
1960	1,807		4.1%
1970	2,155		19.3%
1980	2,228		3.4%
1990	2,212		−0.7%
2000	2,175		−1.7%
2010	2,436		12.0%
2020	2,788		14.4%
2025 (est.)	4,291		53.9%
U.S. Decennial Census

=== 2020 census ===
As of the 2020 census, Ferris had a population of 2,788, 968 households, and 803 families residing in the city. The median age was 34.2 years, with 27.0% of residents under the age of 18 and 11.9% of residents 65 years of age or older. For every 100 females there were 94.0 males, and for every 100 females age 18 and over there were 90.0 males age 18 and over.

91.7% of residents lived in urban areas, while 8.3% lived in rural areas.

Of the 968 households, 42.1% had children under the age of 18 living in them. Of all households, 47.2% were married-couple households, 16.0% were households with a male householder and no spouse or partner present, and 31.1% were households with a female householder and no spouse or partner present. About 21.0% of all households were made up of individuals and 8.2% had someone living alone who was 65 years of age or older.

There were 1,038 housing units, of which 6.7% were vacant. The homeowner vacancy rate was 3.2% and the rental vacancy rate was 6.9%.

Racial composition as of the 2020 census
Race	Number	Percent
White	1,219	43.7%
Black or African American	479	17.2%
American Indian and Alaska Native	47	1.7%
Asian	12	0.4%
Native Hawaiian and Other Pacific Islander	1	0.0%
Some other race	661	23.7%
Two or more races	369	13.2%
Hispanic or Latino (of any race)	1,315	47.2%

=== 2010 census ===
In 2010, Ferris had a population of 2,436. The racial and ethnic composition of the population in 2010 was 42.7% non-Hispanic white, 17.5% non-Hispanic black, 1% Hispanic black, 0.3% Native American, 0.2% Asian, 1.8% from two or more races and 38.4% Hispanic or Latino.

== Education ==
Pupils in Ferris are served by the Ferris Independent School District.

Some areas in Dallas County not within the Ferris city limits but with Ferris addresses are served by the Dallas Independent School District. The areas were served by the Wilmer-Hutchins Independent School District until it closed during the 2005–2006 school year.

The designated community college for Ellis County is Navarro College. The designated community college for Dallas County is Dallas College (formerly Dallas County Community College District or DCCCD).

== Transportation ==
=== Major highways ===
- Interstate 45

=== Airport ===
Ferris is also served by the privately owned Dallas South Port Airport.

=== Heliport ===
Ferris Red Oak Muni
- IATA: none; ICAO: none; FAA LID: 12T

Summary
- Airport type: Public
- Owner: Cities of Ferris and Red Oak
- Serves: Ferris, Texas; Red Oak, Texas
- Elevation AMSL: 510 ft (160 m)
- Coordinates: 32°31′47.5″N 096°43′52.18″W

Map
- Location within Texas

Helipads
Number	Length		Surface
Number	ft	m	Surface
H1	40	12	Concrete

Statistics (2015)
- Aircraft operations: 0
- Based aircraft: 0
- Source: Federal Aviation Administration

Ferris Red Oak Muni Heliport (FAA LID: 12T) is a city-owned public heliport in Ellis County, Texas, United States, serving the cities of Ferris and Red Oak. The heliport has no IATA or ICAO designation. The facility is alternatively known as the Ferris Red Oak Municipal Heliport.

The Ferris and Red Oak jointly own the heliport, although the listed owner address is in Ferris, and it is maintained by City of Ferris Public Works. The heliport is used solely for general aviation purposes.

Ferris Red Oak Muni has one helipad:

- H1: 40 x 40 ft. (12 x 12 m), Surface: Concrete

In the year ending September 29, 2015, the heliport had no based aircraft nor reported aircraft operations.

== Notable people ==
- Guilherme Marchi, Professional bull rider and 2008 PBR world champion
- Homer P. Rainey, Former University of Texas president; briefly attended Ferris High School
