= Ovilla Christian School =

Coordinates: 32.531°N 96.882°W

- Ovilla, Texas; USA

Information
- Type: Private
- Motto: Preparing Students for Life
- Established: 1992
- Founder: Nick Harris
- Headmaster: Bob Yttredahl
- Gender: Co-ed
- Campus: 54 acres (0.22 km^{2})
- Colors: Hunter Green, Blue, and White
- Mascot: Soaring Eagles
- Website: Ovilla Christian School

Ovilla Christian School (OCS) is a private Christian school located in Ovilla, Texas, a suburb of Dallas, Texas. Founded in 1990 with nine kindergarten students, OCS is a ministry of Ovilla Road Baptist Church (ORBC) and is co-located with the church on a 54-acre (220,000 m^{2}) campus.

== Academics ==
OCS offers classes from PreK-3 through Grade 12. The majority of its classes use BJU Press curriculum.

OCS is accredited by the Association of Christian Schools International (ACSI) and Cognia.

In lieu of offering advanced courses via either the Advanced Placement or International Baccalaureate programs, it offers a variety of dual credit courses through partnerships with Dallas Baptist University and LeTourneau University, and further permits sophomores to enroll in those courses.

OCS students can compete in academic events through TAPPS and ACSI.

== Athletics ==
OCS is a member of the Texas Association of Private and Parochial Schools (TAPPS). As of the 2026-28 alignment it is in Class 2A (Division II for six-man football)

OCS participates in the following sports:

- Football (six-man)
- Volleyball
- Cross-Country
- Cheerleading
- Basketball
- Baseball
- Softball
- Track and Field
- Golf
- Tennis

OCS has become a small-school powerhouse in volleyball, having won seven TAPPS 2A state championships (2018, 2019, 2020, 2022, 2023, 2024, and 2026). It also has won the TAPPS 2A baseball championship, in 2023.

== Notable alumni ==
- Brian Harrison, member of the Texas House of Representatives
