= Focus Daily News =

Daily newspaper in Dallas County, Texas, US

- Type: Daily newspaper
- Format: Broadsheet
- Owner: Focus Newspapers of DFW
- Publisher: Marlon Hanson
- Editor: Kristin Barclay
- Founded: 1987
- Headquarters: 337 Marilyn Avenue DeSoto, Texas 75115; USA
- Circulation: 14,996 (as of 2023)
- Website: Focus Daily News

The Focus Daily News is a daily newspaper published in DeSoto, Texas, covering Dallas County. It is locally owned and operated by Focus Newspapers of DFW. The newspaper is published on Tuesday, Wednesday, Thursday, Friday, and Sunday.

Focus Daily News is the official newspaper of record for DeSoto, Duncanville, Cedar Hill, Lancaster, Hutchins, and Glenn Heights, Texas. The newspaper is dedicated to the southern suburbs of the Dallas/Ft. Worth metroplex. It publishes a combination of local, state, and national news and opinions. It also covers high school sports, local school news, community events, automotive reviews, travel stories, and legal notices affecting residents.

The newspaper has a daily circulation of 28,065 and a Sunday circulation of 36,297 as of 2012. Focus Daily News is the largest circulation suburban daily newspaper in Texas.
