= DeSoto Independent School District =

School district in Dallas County, Texas, United States

Coordinates: 32.58662°N 96.86750°W

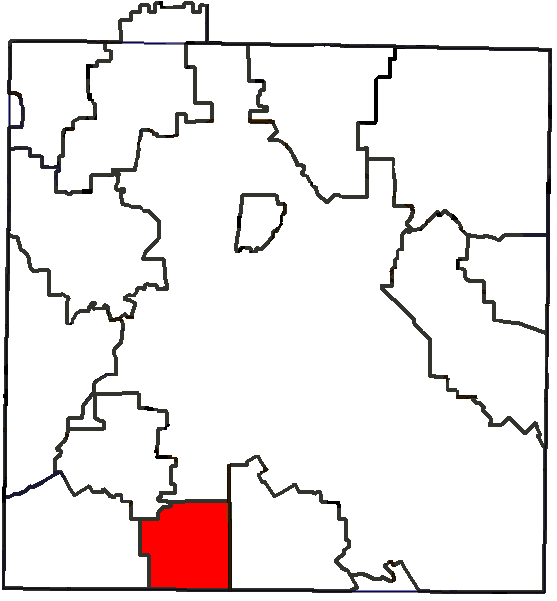
- Location of DeSoto ISD in Dallas County

Location
- DeSoto, Texas, USA

District information
- Type: Public
- Superintendent: Dr. Usamah Rodgers

Students and staff
- Enrollment: 8,716 (2021-2022)
- Faculty: 1,051 (2021-2022)

DeSoto Independent School District is a school district based in DeSoto, Texas (USA). The district covers most of DeSoto, the Dallas County portion of Glenn Heights, and a section of Ovilla in Dallas County, as well as a small portion of Cedar Hill.

In 2009, the school district was rated "academically acceptable" by the Texas Education Agency.

Dr. Usamah Rodgers was chosen to lead the district as superintendent in May 2022.

== History ==
In 2005 Alton Frailey, superintendent of the district, said that the affluence within some students in the district lead to apathy regarding school performance. Frailey said that many African American parents from the previous generation had tried very hard to improve their socioeconomic status, but some of their children may believe that they will easily attain what they wish in life, or believe that education is not a priority. With a current enrollment just over 8700 students, DeSoto ISD is a small, suburban district 15 miles south of Dallas in north Texas. The 23-square-mile district serves students in DeSoto, Glenn Heights, and Ovilla with 12 campuses and 1051 total of staff and employees.

In 2016, DeSoto ISD reported that 80% of its high school students where of Black or African-American descent, making it a predominantly black school for the first time ever.

In the 2018-19 school year, DeSoto ISD addressed several community concerns in a public release document. According to the issue, DHS struggled with low morale and retention rates amongst educators. This was listed as a root cause of low student performance. Low teacher morale was assumed to be caused by the fact that the school had 3 principals in last 4 years in 2018.

In 2021 DeSoto ISD implemented a mask mandate during the COVID-19 pandemic in Texas and kept it in place even when the Texas Supreme Court upheld Governor of Texas Greg Abbott's ban on mask mandates.

== Schools ==
High Schools (Grades 9-12)

- DeSoto High School and DeSoto High School-Freshman Campus (DeSoto)

Middle Schools (Grades 6-8)

- DeSoto West Middle School (DeSoto)
- Curtistine S. McCowan Middle School (Glenn Heights)

Elementary Schools (Grades K-5)

- Cockrell Hill Elementary School (DeSoto)
- Frank D. Moates Elementary School (Glenn Heights)
- Katherine Johnson Technology Magnet Academy (DeSoto)
- Ruby Young Talented and Gifted Academy (DeSoto)
- The Meadows Elementary School (DeSoto)
- Woodridge Elementary School (DeSoto)

Other Schools

- Amber Terrace Discovery and Design Early Childhood Academy (PreK)
- DeSoto Alternative Education Program

== Student Demographics ==
DeSoto ISD student demographic figures as of the 2005-2006 school year:

=== Enrollment ===
- High School (3100)
  - DeSoto High
- Junior High Schools (1,464)
  - DeSoto East (637)
  - DeSoto West (827)
- Intermediate Schools (1,249)
  - Amber Terrace (674)
  - The Meadows (575)
- Elementary Schools (3,032)
  - Cockrell Hill (655)
  - Frank D. Moates (707)
  - Northside (473)
  - Ruby Young (523)
  - Woodridge (674)
- Other (23)
  - PASS Learning Center (23)

=== Ethnicity and economic status ===
African American	6,243	74.24%
Hispanic	1,249	14.85%
White	834	9.92%
Asian	63	0.75%
Native American	20	0.24%
Total	8,409	100.00%

In 1997 over half of the DeSoto ISD students were non-Hispanic white. From that year until 2016 the number of non-Hispanic white students declined by 91% to 2016, when 3% of the students were non-Hispanic white. Eric Nicholson of the Dallas Observer wrote that because of the "relatively small" sizes of southern Dallas County school districts, the demographic changes were relatively more severe compared to districts in other parts of the county.

From 1997 to 2016 the number of students on free or reduced lunches, a way of designating someone as low income, increased by 400%.

Eric Nicholson of the Dallas Observer wrote that because of the "relatively small" sizes of southern Dallas County school districts, the demographic changes were relatively more severe compared to districts in other parts of the county.

== School uniforms ==
In the 2005-2006 school year, DeSoto ISD began a mandatory school uniform policy at all of its schools.

In 2018, uniforms were discontinued district-wide.

In the 2023-2024 school year, they implemented school uniforms again but only for elementary and middle schools.

== See also ==
- List of school districts in Texas
