= Red Oak Independent School District =

School district in Texas

Coordinates: 32.5173°N 96.8043°W

Location
- Red Oak, Texas; United States

District information
- Type: Public
- Motto: Our Student's Success is Our Success
- Grades: PK–12
- Superintendent: Brenda C. Sanford

Other information
- Website: www.redoakisd.org

The Red Oak Independent School District is a school district in northern Ellis County, Texas (USA).

The district serves the majorities of the municipalities of Red Oak, Pecan Hill and Oak Leaf, along with some portions of Glenn Heights, Ovilla, and Waxahachie.

In 2010, the school district was rated "Recognized" by the Texas Education Agency.

== Schools ==
=== Elementary schools ===
- Donald T. Shields Elementary (Grades K-5)
- Eastridge Elementary (K-5)
- Red Oak Elementary (K-5)
- Wooden Elementary (K–5)
- Russell P Schupmann Elementary (PK -5)

=== Middle schools ===
- Red Oak Middle School (6–8)
- Dr. Joy Shaw Middle School (6-8) *opened on paper at the start of the 2025-2026 school year and building opens January 2026.

=== High schools ===
- Red Oak High School (9–12)

=== Alternative education ===
- Acorn Academy

=== Future Schools ===
Elementary no 6 (opening TBA)

== See also ==
- List of school districts in Texas
