= Glenn Heights, Texas =

- City
- Location of Glenn Heights, Texas
- Coordinates: 32°33′20″N 96°51′50″W
- Country: United States
- State: Texas
- Counties: Dallas, Ellis

Government
  - Type: Council-Manager
  - City Council: Mayor

Area
  - Total: 7.21 sq mi (18.68 km^{2})
  - Land: 7.21 sq mi (18.68 km^{2})
  - Water: 0.0039 sq mi (0.01 km^{2})
- Elevation: 682 ft (208 m)

Population (2020)
  - Total: 15,819
  - Density: 1,855.1/sq mi (716.25/km^{2})
- Time zone: UTC-6 (Central (CST))
  - Summer (DST): UTC-5 (CDT)
- ZIP code: 75154
- Area codes: 214, 469, 945, 972
- FIPS code: 48-29840
- GNIS feature ID: 2410602
- Website: www.glennheightstx.gov

Glenn Heights is a city in Dallas and Ellis counties in the U.S. state of Texas. The population was 11,278 at the 2010 census, and 15,819 in 2020.

== History ==
Development of the community dates back to the late 1960s. N.L. 'Moe' Craddock, a Dallas firefighter, opened a 30-acre (120,000 m^{2}) mobile home park in the area. He helped push for the incorporation of Glenn Heights to prevent his business from being annexed by the city of DeSoto. The town was officially incorporated on September 16, 1969. Mr. Craddock remained active in Glenn Heights politics, serving on the city council during the 1970s and 1980s. He was appointed mayor in 1985 and was elected to that office in 1988, 1990, and 1992.

There were 257 residents living in Glenn Heights at the 1970 census. That figure rose to 1,033 in 1980 and more than doubled for a second consecutive decade to 4,564 by 1990. Lying in the path of suburban sprawl, Glenn Heights' population had surpassed 7,000 by 2000. Despite its rapid rate of growth, more than 50 percent of city land remains undeveloped.

== Geography ==
According to the United States Census Bureau, the city has a total area of 7.2 square miles (18.7 km^{2}), all of it land.

== Demographics ==
Historical population
Census	Pop.	Note	%±
1970	257		—
1980	1,033		301.9%
1990	4,564		341.8%
2000	7,224		58.3%
2010	11,278		56.1%
2020	15,819		40.3%
2025 (est.)	20,327		28.5%
U.S. Decennial Census

=== Racial and ethnic composition ===
Glenn Heights city, Texas – Racial and ethnic composition Note: the US Census treats Hispanic/Latino as an ethnic category. This table excludes Latinos from the racial categories and assigns them to a separate category. Hispanics/Latinos may be of any race.
Race / Ethnicity (NH = Non-Hispanic)	Pop 2000	Pop 2010	Pop 2020	% 2000	% 2010	% 2020
White alone (NH)	4,120	2,844	2,395	57.03%	25.22%	15.14%
Black or African American alone (NH)	1,795	5,598	8,630	24.85%	49.64%	54.55%
Native American or Alaska Native alone (NH)	51	53	33	0.71%	0.47%	0.21%
Asian alone (NH)	27	64	79	0.37%	0.57%	0.50%
Native Hawaiian or Pacific Islander alone (NH)	6	4	4	0.08%	0.04%	0.03%
Other race alone (NH)	4	10	67	0.06%	0.09%	0.42%
Mixed race or Multiracial (NH)	84	203	401	1.16%	1.80%	2.53%
Hispanic or Latino (any race)	1,137	2,502	4,210	15.74%	22.18%	26.61%
Total	7,224	11,278	15,819	100.00%	100.00%	100.00%

=== 2020 census ===
As of the 2020 United States census, Glenn Heights had a population of 15,819. The median age was 32.4 years. 30.5% of residents were under the age of 18 and 7.4% of residents were 65 years of age or older. For every 100 females there were 89.4 males, and for every 100 females age 18 and over there were 82.5 males age 18 and over. There were 5,091 households and 3,105 families residing in the city.

100.0% of residents lived in urban areas, while 0.0% lived in rural areas.

Of the 5,091 households in Glenn Heights, 48.2% had children under the age of 18 living in them. Of all households, 46.5% were married-couple households, 13.4% were households with a male householder and no spouse or partner present, and 33.2% were households with a female householder and no spouse or partner present. About 17.2% of all households were made up of individuals and 4.4% had someone living alone who was 65 years of age or older.

There were 5,276 housing units, of which 3.5% were vacant. The homeowner vacancy rate was 1.9% and the rental vacancy rate was 4.4%.

Racial composition as of the 2020 census
Race	Number	Percent
White	3,294	20.8%
Black or African American	8,720	55.1%
American Indian and Alaska Native	128	0.8%
Asian	80	0.5%
Native Hawaiian and Other Pacific Islander	5	0.0%
Some other race	1,856	11.7%
Two or more races	1,736	11.0%
Hispanic or Latino (of any race)	4,210	26.6%

== Education ==
The Dallas County portion of Glenn Heights is served by the DeSoto Independent School District, while the Ellis County portion is served by the Red Oak Independent School District.

The Dallas County portion is zoned to Cockrell Hill Elementary School (grades Kindergarten through 2), Frank Moates Elementary School (grades 3-5), Curtistene S. McCowan Middle School, DeSoto High School Freshman Campus, and DeSoto High School.

The Ellis County portion is zoned to Donald T. Shields Elementary School, Red Oak Intermediate School, Red Oak Junior High School, and Red Oak High School.

All of Dallas County (its portion of Glenn Heights included) is in the service area of Dallas College (formerly Dallas County Community College). All of Ellis County (its portion of Glenn Heights included) is in the service area of Navarro College.

== Transportation ==
Glenn Heights is the only suburb (except for Cockrell Hill, which is technically an enclave and not a suburb) in the southern half of Dallas County that is a member of Dallas Area Rapid Transit; it has been since DART's inception in 1983. The Glenn Heights Park & Ride Center serves the city. None of DART's current commuter rail lines serve Glenn Heights, nor will any of its proposed extensions.
