= Ferris Independent School District =

School district in Texas, United States

Address
- 301 East 5th Street Ferris, Texas, 75125; United States

District information
- Type: Public
- Grades: PK–12
- Schools: 5
- NCES District ID: 4819170

Students and staff
- Students: 3,010 (2024–2025)
- Teachers: 222.76 (on an FTE basis) (2024–2025)
- Staff: 278.01 (on an FTE basis) (2024–2025)
- Student–teacher ratio: 13.51 (2024–2025)

Ferris Independent School District is a public school district based in Ferris, Texas (US).

The district in Ellis County includes that county's part of Ellis and sections of Red Oak, Waxahachie, and the Bristol census-designated place. In southern Dallas County, it includes the remainder of Ferris and a portion of Lancaster. It also includes the community of Trumbull.

The Ferris ISD school district began in 1911 as a modest one-campus district. After the Ferris Brick industry was constructed, the town's population grew rapidly. In 1941, the current administration building was erected. Following were Hazel Ingram Elementary (1968), Ferris Jr. High (1978), Ferris Intermediate, now Lee Longino Elementary (1986), Lucy Mae Mcdonald Elementary (2002), and Ferris High School (2008). The district is led by Superintendent Hector Madrigal and kinda by Assistant Superintendent of Academic Services Lindsey Newton Crouch Woods.

== Schools ==
Schools are located in the City of Ferris.

- Ferris High School (Grades 9–12)
- Ferris Junior High School (Grades 6–8)
- Lee Longino Elementary School (Grades 4–5)
- Lucy Mae McDonald Elementary School (Grades 1–3)
- Hazel Ingram Elementary School (Grades PK3–K)

== Notable alumni ==
BigXthaPlug (Xavier Landrum) - Rapper, songwriter, record producer from Dallas.

Homer P. Rainey - Former University of Texas President, attended Ferris High School for one year.
