= Red Oak, Texas =

- City
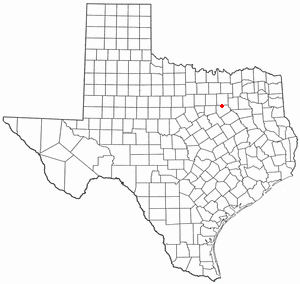
- Location in the state of Texas

- Coordinates: 32°30′15″N 96°45′20″W
- Country: United States
- State: Texas
- County: Ellis

Government
  - Type: Council-manager

Area
  - Total: 15.37 sq mi (39.82 km^{2})
  - Land: 15.37 sq mi (39.81 km^{2})
  - Water: 0.0039 sq mi (0.01 km^{2})
- Elevation: 604 ft (184 m)

Population (2020)
  - Total: 14,222
  - Estimate (2025): 20,394
  - Density: 925.3/sq mi (357.2/km^{2})
- Time zone: UTC-6 (Central)
  - Summer (DST): UTC-5 (Central)
- ZIP code: 75154
- Area codes: 214, 469, 945, 972
- FIPS code: 48-61196
- GNIS feature ID: 2411530
- Website: www.redoaktx.org

Red Oak is a city in Ellis County, Texas, United States. It is part of the Dallas–Fort Worth metroplex. As of the 2020 census, Red Oak had a population of 14,222, increasing to an estimated 20,394 in 2025.

== History ==
Some of the first settlers to this area were James E. Patton and his family in 1844. They settled in what is now known as Ovilla, Texas, located about 2 miles from Red Oak. Before Red Oak was given its name in 1849, it was known as Possum Trot due to the animal that lived there. The Missouri, Kansas and Texas Railroad reached Red Oak in 1884 and was completed in 1890,. providing service between Dallas and Waco. In 1949, Red Oak became an incorporated town of Ellis, County. In 2023, Google announced a $600 million data center campus on a 375-acre plot, right off Ovilla Road in Red Oak, making it the second data center to be built in Texas.

== Geography ==
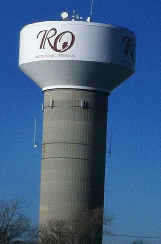
Water tower in Glenn Heights, on west side of I-35E

Red Oak is located along the northern edge of Ellis County. Adjacent cities include Glenn Heights to the northwest, Lancaster to the north, Ferris to the east, Pecan Hill to the southeast, Waxahachie to the south, and Oak Leaf to the west. It is 18 miles (29 km) south of downtown Dallas via Interstate 35E, which has two exits in Red Oak.

According to the United States Census Bureau, Red Oak has a total area of 15.0 square miles (38.8 km^{2}), all land.

=== Climate ===
The climate in this area is characterized by hot, humid summers and generally mild to cool winters. According to the Köppen climate classification, Red Oak has a humid subtropical climate, Cfa on climate maps.

== Demographics ==
Historical population
Census	Pop.	Note	%±
1960	415		—
1970	767		84.8%
1980	1,882		145.4%
1990	3,124		66.0%
2000	4,301		37.7%
2010	10,769		150.4%
2020	14,222		32.1%
2025 (est.)	20,394		43.4%
U.S. Decennial Census

=== 2020 census ===
As of the 2020 census, 14,222 residents, 4,751 households, and 3,293 families resided in the city.

The median age was 35.5 years; 28.1% of residents were under 18 and 11.6% were 65 or older. For every 100 females, there were 90.1 males, and for every 100 females 18 and over, there were 84.0 males 18 and over.

About 93.8% of residents lived in urban areas, while 6.2% lived in rural areas.

Of the 4,751 households in Red Oak, 43.9% had children under 18 living in them, 53.7% were married-couple households, 13.1% were households with a male householder and no spouse or partner present, and 28.1% were households with a female householder and no spouse or partner present. About 18.5% of all households were made up of individuals, and 6.5% had someone living alone who was 65 or older.

The city had 4,985 housing units, of which 4.7% were vacant. The homeowner vacancy rate was 1.6% and the rental vacancy rate was 6.7%.

Racial composition as of the 2020 census
Race	Number	Percentage
White	6,219	43.7%
Black or African American	4,548	32.0%
American Indian and Alaska Native	95	0.7%
Asian	134	0.9%
Native Hawaiian and other Pacific Islander	8	0.1%
Some other race	1,378	9.7%
Two or more races	1,840	12.9%
Hispanic or Latino (of any race)	3,519	24.7%

== Education ==
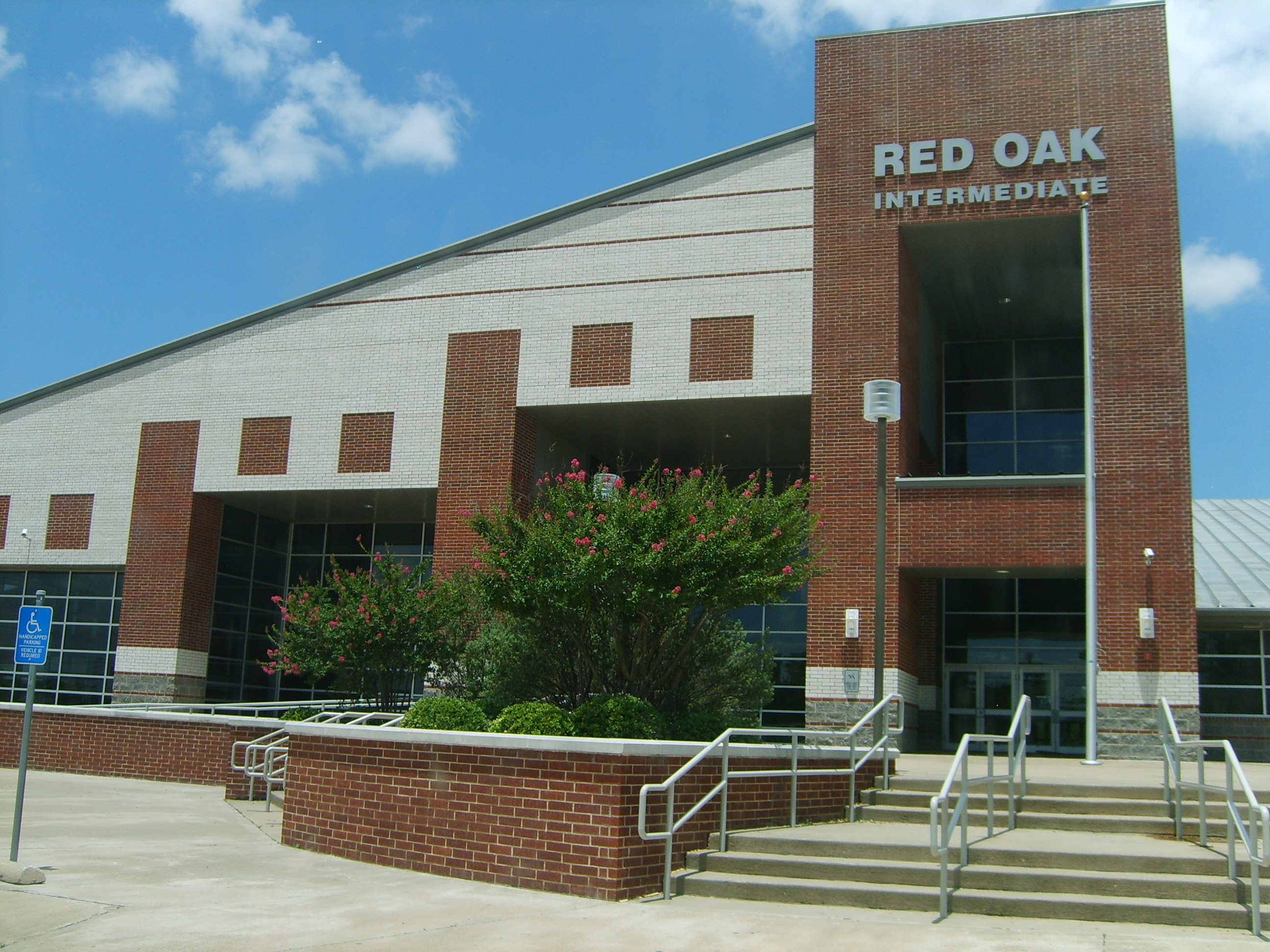
Image of Red Oak Intermediate School from 2010, taken in Red Oak, Texas

The majority of the city of Red Oak is served by the Red Oak Independent School District. That district's schools include Shields Elementary, Eastridge Elementary, Red Oak Elementary, Wooden Elementary, Russell P Schupmann Elementary, Red Oak Middle School, and Red Oak High School.

The city extends into the Waxahachie Independent School District and the Ferris Independent School District. The former operates Waxahachie High School.

In addition, Life School, a public charter school, operates a kindergarten - grade 12 Red Oak campus.

Texas State Technical College operates a branch campus in Red Oak.

== Transportation ==
=== Major highways ===
- Interstate 35E/U.S. Route 77

=== Air ===
The city of Red Oak jointly owns the Ferris Red Oak Muni Heliport with the city of Ferris.

== Notable people ==
- Demi Burnett, contestant on season 23 of The Bachelor
- Michelle Carter, gold medal winner in the women's shotput at the 2016 Summer Olympics in Rio de Janeiro
- Pinky Higgins, Major League Baseball (MLB) player and manager, born in Red Oak
- Buddy Groom, MLB pitcher for the Oakland A's, graduated Red Oak High School in 1983
- Sarah Jaffe, singer/songwriter
- Louise Ritter, gold medal winner in the women's high jump at the 1988 Summer Olympics
- Nikki Stringfield, guitarist for American heavy metal band the Iron Maiden
