= Pecan Hill, Texas =

- City
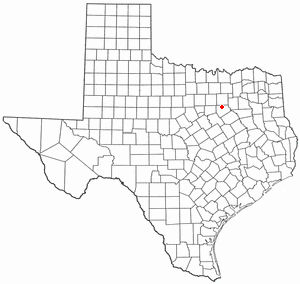
- Location of Pecan Hill, Texas

- Coordinates: 32°29′50″N 96°46′35″W
- Country: United States
- State: Texas
- County: Ellis

Area
  - Total: 2.13 sq mi (5.51 km^{2})
  - Land: 2.13 sq mi (5.51 km^{2})
  - Water: 0 sq mi (0.00 km^{2})
- Elevation: 554 ft (169 m)

Population (2020)
  - Total: 735
  - Density: 345/sq mi (133/km^{2})
- Time zone: UTC-6 (Central (CST))
  - Summer (DST): UTC-5 (CDT)
- Area codes: 214, 469, 945, 972
- FIPS code: 48-56485
- GNIS feature ID: 2411395
- Website: www.pecanhill.com

Pecan Hill is a city in Ellis County, Texas, United States. The population was 735 at the 2020 census, up from 626 at the 2010 census.

== Geography ==
Pecan Hill is located in northern Ellis County and is bordered to the north by the city of Red Oak. Waxahachie, the county seat, is 10 miles (16 km) to the southwest, and downtown Dallas is 24 miles (39 km) to the north.

According to the United States Census Bureau, Pecan Hill has a total area of 2.1 square miles (5.5 km^{2}), all land.

== Demographics ==
Historical population
Census	Pop.	Note	%±
1990	564		—
2000	672		19.1%
2010	626		−6.8%
2020	735		17.4%
U.S. Decennial Census; 2020 Census

=== 2020 census ===
As of the 2020 census, Pecan Hill had a population of 735. The median age was 44.8 years. 22.4% of residents were under the age of 18 and 20.7% of residents were 65 years of age or older.

For every 100 females there were 98.1 males, and for every 100 females age 18 and over there were 96.6 males age 18 and over.

25.0% of residents lived in urban areas, while 75.0% lived in rural areas.

There were 261 households in Pecan Hill, of which 40.2% had children under the age of 18 living in them. Of all households, 62.5% were married-couple households, 10.0% were households with a male householder and no spouse or partner present, and 19.5% were households with a female householder and no spouse or partner present. About 11.4% of all households were made up of individuals and 6.5% had someone living alone who was 65 years of age or older.

There were 261 housing units, of which 0.0% were vacant. The homeowner vacancy rate was 0.0% and the rental vacancy rate was 0.0%.

Racial composition as of the 2020 census
Race	Number	Percent
White	554	75.4%
Black or African American	21	2.9%
American Indian and Alaska Native	7	1.0%
Asian	2	0.3%
Native Hawaiian and Other Pacific Islander	0	0.0%
Some other race	50	6.8%
Two or more races	101	13.7%
Hispanic or Latino (of any race)	173	23.5%

=== 2000 census ===
As of the census of 2000, there were 672 people, 226 households, and 200 families residing in the city. The population density was 345.0 inhabitants per square mile (133.2/km^{2}). There were 234 housing units at an average density of 120.1 per square mile (46.4/km^{2}). The racial makeup of the city was 93.75% White, 1.19% African American, 0.30% Native American, 4.32% from other races, and 0.45% from two or more races. Hispanic or Latino of any race were 8.78% of the population.

There were 226 households, out of which 44.2% had children under the age of 18 living with them, 73.9% were married couples living together, 12.8% had a female householder with no husband present, and 11.1% were non-families. 9.3% of all households were made up of individuals, and 3.1% had someone living alone who was 65 years of age or older. The average household size was 2.97 and the average family size was 3.14.

In the city, the population was spread out, with 29.5% under the age of 18, 7.0% from 18 to 24, 28.4% from 25 to 44, 28.1% from 45 to 64, and 7.0% who were 65 years of age or older. The median age was 39 years. For every 100 females, there were 98.8 males. For every 100 females age 18 and over, there were 88.1 males.

The median income for a household in the city was $55,000, and the median income for a family was $57,596. Males had a median income of $43,125 versus $29,432 for females. The per capita income for the city was $21,195. About 3.1% of families and 2.6% of the population were below the poverty line, including 2.0% of those under age 18 and none of those age 65 or over.

== Education ==
Most of Pecan Hill is served by the Red Oak Independent School District, while portions are in the Waxahachie Independent School District. The respective zoned public high schools are Red Oak High School and Waxahachie High School.
