= DeSoto, Texas =

City in the United States

- City
- Flag
- Motto: "Live, Work, Play in DeSoto"
- Location of DeSoto in Dallas County, Texas
- Coordinates: 32°35′57″N 96°51′32″W
- Country: United States of America
- State: Texas
- County: Dallas
- Incorporated: 1949

Government
  - Type: Council-manager
  - City Council: Mayor

Area
  - Total: 21.67 sq mi (56.12 km^{2})
  - Land: 21.63 sq mi (56.03 km^{2})
  - Water: 0.035 sq mi (0.09 km^{2})
- Elevation: 666 ft (203 m)

Population (2020)
  - Total: 56,145
  - Density: 2,595.3/sq mi (1,002.07/km^{2})
- Time zone: UTC-6 (Central)
  - Summer (DST): UTC-5 (Central)
- ZIP codes: 75115, 75123
- Area codes: 214, 469, 945, 972
- FIPS code: 48-20092
- GNIS feature ID: 2410329
- Website: The City of DeSoto, Texas

DeSoto is a city in Dallas County, Texas, United States. DeSoto is a suburb of Dallas and is part of the Best Southwest area, which includes DeSoto, Cedar Hill, Duncanville, and Lancaster. As of the 2020 census, DeSoto had a population of 56,145.

== History ==
The area was first settled in 1847, making it one of the oldest communities in North Texas. A post office was established in 1881, and the settlement was named DeSoto in honor of Thomas Hernando DeSoto Stewart, a doctor dedicated to the community. By 1885, DeSoto was home to around 120 people, a cotton gin, and a general store. Soon after, the population declined to below 50. In 1930, 97 people were living in the community, with several businesses.

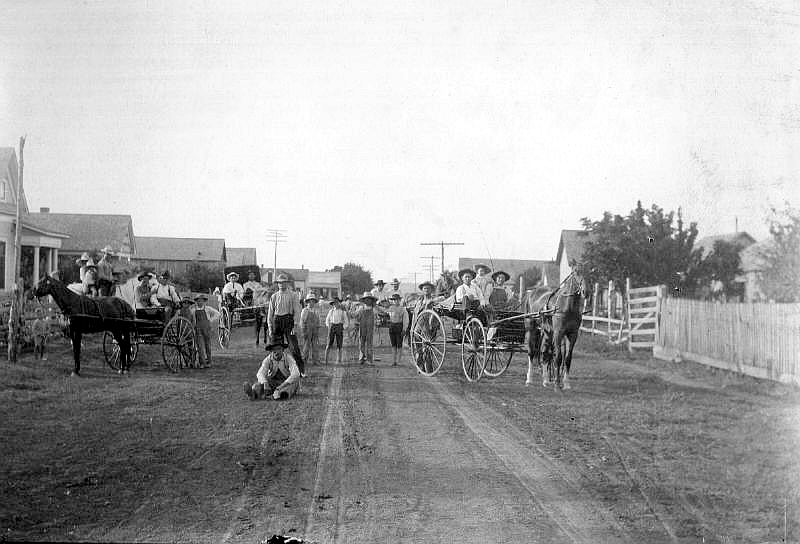
DeSoto circa 1911

After World War II, DeSoto and surrounding areas began to grow. To improve the inadequate water distribution system, residents felt the need to incorporate the town. On February 17, 1949, a petition signed by 42 eligible voters was presented to the Dallas County judge requesting an election for incorporation. The vote took place on March 2. Of the 52 people who cast ballots, 50 voted in favor of incorporation and two were opposed. On March 3, 1949, the results were entered into the records of the Dallas County Commissioners Court, thereby creating the City of DeSoto. The new city was less than one square mile in size. On March 15, Wayne A. Chowning was elected mayor along with five aldermen. The first city council meeting was held two days later.

The first census conducted after DeSoto's incorporation occurred in 1950. eight businesses and 298 people were in the city. Following a series of annexations in 1953, the city covered around 15 sq mi (39 km^{2}). By 1960, the population had grown to 1,969. In 1970, DeSoto was home to 6,617 people and 71 businesses.

During the 1970s, continued growth brought about improvements to the municipal infrastructure, including road construction, and a new water/sewage system. Industrial, commercial, and residential construction also increased. On October 26, 1974, an election was held to determine the status of Woodland Hills, a small, incorporated community located northwest of DeSoto. The result was 221 votes in favor of a merger with DeSoto and 219 opposed. Woodland Hills had a population of 366 at the time of annexation. The rapid growth that began in the early 1970s was sustained throughout the 1980s; 1980 census figures put the city's population at slightly over 15,000. By 1984, DeSoto had a total of 360 businesses, up from 168 in 1980.

The population surpassed 30,000 in 1990. City development progressed in the following years. A primary example of this was the creation of DeSoto's Town Center. Officials converted an abandoned strip center located at one of the city's main intersections into a unique central business district. Since its opening, the Town Center has become an anchor of the community, housing city hall, the public library, a civic center, recreation cente, and a 180-seat auditorium and outdoor amphitheater.

Throughout the 1990s, DeSoto experienced a significant change in the demographic composition of the city. In the 1990 census, Whites comprised 75.97% of the city's population, but that figure had declined to 48.83% in the 2000 census, and 17.4% non-Hispanic White by 2010. By contrast, the African American population grew rapidly. In 2000, African Americans were 45.53% of the population, up from 20.83% in 1990. Hispanics accounted for 4.98% of the population in 1990 and 7.30% in 2000. With roughly 45,500 residents as of 2005, DeSoto is the largest and most diverse city in southwest Dallas County.

On June 11, 2006, the National Civic League named DeSoto an "All-America City". This award is the nation's oldest community-recognition program and recognizes communities whose citizens work together to identify and tackle community-wide challenges and achieve uncommon results.

A 2015 article related a growing trend of largely middle-class and college-educated African Americans moving to DeSoto.

In April 2026, the Aquatic and Recreation Center was opened at McCowan Park.

== Geography ==
According to the United States Census Bureau, the city has a total area of 21.6 sq mi (56 km^{2}), all land.

== Demographics ==
Historical population
Census	Pop.	Note	%±
1950	298		—
1960	1,969		560.7%
1970	6,617		236.1%
1980	15,538		134.8%
1990	30,544		96.6%
2000	37,646		23.3%
2010	49,047		30.3%
2020	56,145		14.5%
2024 (est.)	56,711		1.0%
U.S. Decennial Census; 1850–1900 1910; 1920 1930 1940; 1950 1960 1970; 1980 1990 2000; 2010 2020

As of the 2020 United States census, 56,145 people resided in the city.

=== Racial and ethnic composition ===
DeSoto city, Texas – Racial and ethnic composition Note: the US Census treats Hispanic/Latino as an ethnic category. This table excludes Latinos from the racial categories and assigns them to a separate category. Hispanics/Latinos may be of any race.
Race / Ethnicity (NH = Non-Hispanic)	Pop 2000	Pop 2010	Pop 2020	% 2000	% 2010	% 2020
White alone (NH)	16,818	8,542	5,640	44.67%	17.42%	10.05%
Black or African American alone (NH)	17,067	33,337	38,971	45.34%	67.97%	69.41%
Native American or Alaska Native alone (NH)	99	111	121	0.26%	0.23%	0.22%
Asian alone (NH)	479	446	487	1.27%	0.91%	0.87%
Native Hawaiian or Pacific Islander alone (NH)	12	22	13	0.03%	0.04%	0.02%
Other race alone (NH)	35	57	229	0.09%	0.12%	0.41%
Mixed race or Multiracial (NH)	386	618	1,367	1.03%	1.26%	2.43%
Hispanic or Latino (any race)	2,750	5,914	9,317	7.30%	12.06%	16.59%
Total	37,646	49,047	56,145	100.00%	100.00%	100.00%

=== 2020 census ===
Per the 2020 census, the median age was 41.0 years; 22.9% of the residents were under 18 and 16.6% were 65. The female/male ratio was 1:0.850 overall and 1:0.796 for those 18 and over.

Almost all of the residents lived in urban areas, while 0.1% lived in rural areas.

Of the 20,512 households in DeSoto, 34.1% had children under 18 living in them, 43.6% were married-couple households, 14.7% were households with a male householder and no spouse or partner present, and 37.2% were households with a female householder and no spouse or partner present. About 25.9% of all households were made up of individuals, and 11.0% had someone living alone who was 65 or older. The 2020 census counted 13,093 families residing in the city.

The city had 21,238 housing units, of which 3.4% were vacant. The homeowner vacancy rate was 1.2% and the rental vacancy rate was 5.0%.

Racial composition as of the 2020 census
Race	Number	Percentage
White	7,125	12.7%
Black or African American	39,335	70.1%
American Indian and Alaska Native	342	0.6%
Asian	504	0.9%
Native Hawaiian and other Pacific Islander	18	0.0%
Some other race	4,145	7.4%
Two or more races	4,676	8.3%
Hispanic or Latino (of any race)	9,317	16.6%

== Politics ==
DeSoto city vote by party in Presidential elections
Year	Democratic	Republican	Third Parties
2020	85.76% 24,227	13.29% 3,754	0.95% 269
2016	83.59% 19,835	14.63% 3,472	1.78% 422
2012	82.39% 19,187	17.16% 3,997	0.45% 105

== Government ==
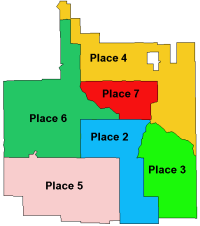
Map of DeSoto's six council districts (places)

DeSoto is a home-rule city with a council–manager form of government. Under this type of local government, the day-to-day management of the city is directed by a city manager, who is appointed by the city council and serves as chief administrative officer for the city. The city charter states this position will execute the laws and administer the government of the city.

The city council consists of the mayor and six council members. The mayor represents the city as a whole and six council members represent particular districts (places) within the city. All are elected citywide for a term of three years with a limit of two terms.

Current City Council Members
Place 1	Rachel Proctor (mayor)
Place 2	Pierette Parker
Place 3	Ken Waters
Place 4	Andre' Byrd Sr.
Place 5	Debrah North
Place 6	Crystal Chism (mayor pro tem)
Place 7	Letitia Hughes

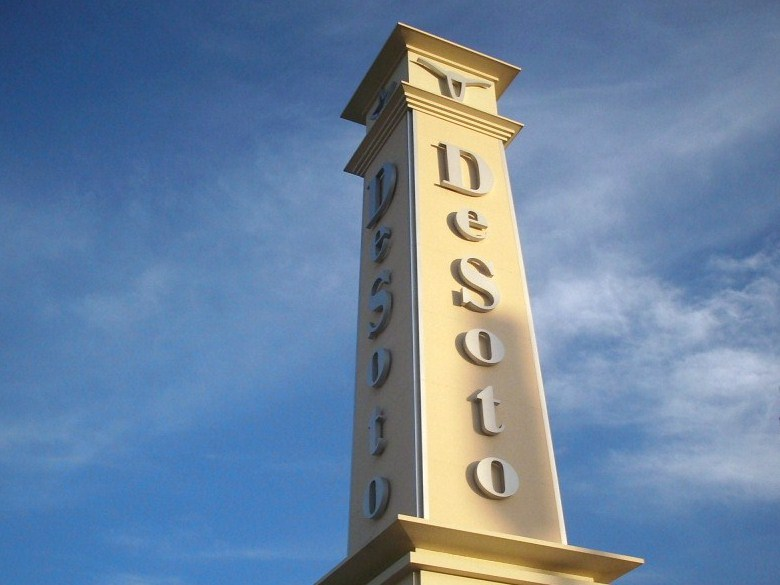
DeSoto entrance marker at I-35E and Pleasant Run Rd.

=== Mayors ===
Term	Mayor
1949–1953	Wayne A. Chowning
1953	Willis Dawson
1953–1955	Floyd Huffstutler
1955–1959	J. B. Wadlington
1959–1963	E. G. Anderson
1963–1965	John Campbell
1965–1967	Les C. Zeiger
1967–1969	L. Carroll Moseley
1969–1971	H. H. Chandler
1971–1972	Roy Orr
1972–1973	Robert Nunneley
1973–1977	Charles Harwell
1977–1979	Durward Davis
1979–1983	Willis Russell
1983–1987	Ernest Roberts
1987–1995	David Doyle
1995–2001	Richard Rozier
2001–2007	Michael Hurtt
2007–2010	Bobby Waddle
2010–2016	Carl Sherman
2016–2020	Curtistene S. McCowan (died in office during her second term)
2021–Present	Rachel L. Proctor

=== City managers ===
Term	City manager
1964–1970	Dewayne White
1970–1973	Jim Pratt
1973–1977	Joel Larkin
1977–1981	Dorothy Talley
1981–1984	Cliff Johnson
1984–1985	Jim McAlister
1985–1987	Kerry Sweatt
1987–1992	Mark Sowa
1992–1993	Ed Brady (interim)
1993–1994	Gary Whittle (interim)
1994–1996	Ron Holifield
1996–1997	Bill Lindley (interim)
1997–2011	Jim Baugh
2011–2019	Dr. Tarron J. Richardson
2019–2020	M. Renee Johnson (interim)
2020–2023	Brandon Wright
2025-present	Majed Al-Ghafry

== Education ==
Most of DeSoto lies within the DeSoto Independent School District. The district has 12 schools (seven elementary schools, three middle schools, a high school, and a freshman campus) that serve about 8,000 students. The district's mascot is the eagle. A small portion of the city is located in the Duncanville Independent School District. Another small portion is in the Dallas Independent School District.

Dallas County residents are zoned to Dallas College (formerly Dallas County Community College).

Several private and parochial schools are in or near the city.

== Media ==
The Focus Daily News is a daily newspaper that was published in DeSoto, covering Dallas County. It is owned by Publishers Newspapers. It was founded in 1987, and had a daily circulation of 28,065 and a Sunday circulation of 36,297 as of 2012. Its last print edition was on December 29, 2024, a Sunday edition, but it continues on line.

== Transportation ==
=== Major highways ===
- Interstate 35E/U.S. Route 77

=== Air ===
The city of DeSoto jointly owns the DeSoto Heliport with the Texas Department of Transportation and the DeSoto Economic Development Corporation. The facility is operated by SKY Helicopters.
