= Jacson =

Jacson is both a surname and a given name. Notable people with the name include:

- Antoine Jacson (1725–1804), Canadian soldier and woodcarver
- Frances Margaretta Jacson (1754–1842), English writer
- Maria Elizabetha Jacson (1755–1829), English writer
- Frank Jacson, an alias of Ramón Mercader (1913–1978), Spanish communist and Soviet spy
- Jacson (footballer, born 1989), Jacson da Paixão Neponuceno, Brazilian football forward
- Jacson (footballer, born 1993), Jacson Glei Da Silva Clemente, Brazilian football forward

== See also ==
- Jackson (given name)
- Jaxson, given name
