= Jackson (given name) =

- Gender: Masculine
- Language: English

Origin
- Meaning: "Son of Jack"

Other names
- Nicknames: Jax, Jack, Jace, Sonny

Jackson is an English masculine given name that originated as a transferred use of the surname, which means "son of Jack". It is in regular use, along with spelling variants such as Jaxon, and Jacksen, Jacson, and Jaxson.

== Notable people ==
- Jackson Abugo, South Sudanese politician
- Jackson Acker (born 2002), American football player
- Jackson de Oliveira Alcántara (born 1987), Brazilian footballer
- Jackson Allen (born 1993), Australian rules football player
- Jackson Anderson (born 1989), American football player
- Jackson Andrews (born 1979), American professional wrestler
- Jackson Anthony (1958–2023), Sri Lankan actor
- Jackson Archer, Australian rules footballer
- Jackson D. Arnold (1912–2007), U.S. Navy admiral
- Jackson Arnold (American football) (born 2004), American football player
- Jackson Asiku (born 1978), Ugandan-Australian boxer
- Jackson Bailey (1925–1996), American historian
- Jackson Barnett (1856–1934), American landowner
- Jackson Barton (born 1995), American football player
- Jackson Baumeister (born 2002), American baseball player
- Jackson Beardy (1944–1984), Canadian Indigenous Oji-Cree Anishinaabe artist
- Jackson Beck (1912–2004), American actor
- Jackson Bennett (born 1996), Canadian football player
- Jackson Berkey (born 1942), American composer, pianist and singer
- Jackson Edward Betts (1904–1993), American politician
- Jackson Bird (born 1990), American vlogger, speaker, LGBTQ advocate, and writer
- Jackson Munro Bird (born 1986), Australian international cricketer
- Jackson Blake (born 2003), American ice hockey player
- Jackson Browne (born 1948), American rock musician, singer, songwriter, and political activist
- Jackson Brundage (born 2001), American actor
- Jackson Burke (1908–1975), American type and book designer
- Jackson Burns
- Jackson J. Bushnell (1815–1873), American professor
- Jackson Cannell (1896–1965), American football player and coach
- Jackson Cantwell (born 2008), American football player
- Jackson Carlaw (born 1959), Scottish politician
- Jackson Carman (born 2000), American football player
- Jackson Cates (born 1997), American ice hockey player
- Jackson B. Chase (1890–1974), American politician
- Jackson Chauke (born 1985), South African boxer
- Jackson Chirwa (born 1995), Zambian footballer
- Jackson Chourio (born 2004), Venezuelan baseball player
- Jackson Collins (born 1998), Australian Olympic canoeist
- Jackson Irving Cope (1925–1999), American academic
- Jackson Corpuz (born 1989), Filipino basketball player
- Jackson Davies (born 1950), Canadian actor
- Jackson Davis (actor) (born 1979), American actor
- Jackson B. Davis (1918–2016), American politician
- Jackson Davis (education official) (1882–1947), American educator
- Jackson Dean (born 2000), American country music singer
- Thomas Jackson Denson (1863–1935), American musician and singing school teacher
- Jackson Doe (1934–1990), Liberian politician
- Jackson Drake (born 2003), American professional wrestler
- Jackson Emery (born 1987), American college basketball player
- Jackson Erdmann (born 1997), American football player
- Jackson Farmer (born 1995), Canadian soccer player
- Jackson Fear (1978–2006), Australian archer
- Jackson Ferris (born 1998), New Zealand rugby league footballer
- Jackson Conner Ferris (born 2004), American baseball player
- Jackson de Figueiredo (1891–1928), Brazilian lawyer, intellectual and journalist
- Jackson Findlay (born 2003), Canadian football player
- Jackson Fiulaua (born 1957), Solomon Islands politician
- Jackson Flora (born 2005), American baseball player
- Jackson Ford (born 1998), Australian rugby league footballer
- Jackson C. Frank (né Jones; 1943–1999), American folk musician
- Jackson Gallagher, Australian actor
- Jackson Galaxy (born 1966), stage name of American Richard Kirschner, American cat behaviorist, YouTuber, and former host of the television show My Cat from Hell
- Jackson Garden-Bachop (born 1994), New Zealand rugby union player
- Jackson Gill (1881–1920), Guyanese cricketer
- Jackson "Jacko" Gill (born 1994), New Zealand track and field athlete
- Jackson Gilman (born 2004), American soccer player
- Jackson Gregory (1882–1943), American teacher, journalist, and writer
- Jackson Guice (1961–2025), American comics artist
- Jackson Guthy (born 1996), American singer-songwriter
- Jackson Harries (born 1993), British filmmaker and YouTuber
- Jackson Harris, American pop singer
- Jackson Harvey (born 2002), Australian freestyle skier
- Jackson Hastings (born 1996), British international rugby league footballer
- Jackson Hawes (born 2000), American football player
- Jackson He (born 1997), Chinese-born American football player
- Jackson Hemopo (born 1993), New Zealand rugby union player
- Jackson Heywood (born 1988), Australian actor
- Jackson Hill (born 1941), American composer
- Jackson Hinkle (born 1999), American political commentator and influencer
- Jackson Holliday (born 2003), American baseball player
- William Jackson Hooker (1785–1865), English botanist and botanical illustrator
- Henry Jackson Hunt (1819–1889), American general and artillery tactician
- Jackson Hurst (born 1979), American actor
- Jackson Irvine (born 1993), Australian footballer
- Papa Jackson, stage name of John S. Gemperle (born 1982), Filipino radio DJ and TV personality
- Jackson Jeffcoat (born 1990), American football player
- Jackson Jobe (born 2002), American baseball player
- Jackson Johonnet, pseudonym of the American author of a 1792 Indian captivity narrative
- Jackson Kabiga (born 1976), Kenyan long-distance runner
- Jackson Kafuuzi (born 1977), Ugandan politician
- Jackson Kemper (1789–1870), American Episcopalian missionary bishop
- Jackson Khoury (born 2002), Australian-Lebanese footballer
- Jackson Kivuva (born 1989), Kenyan runner
- Jackson Koivun (born 2005), American amateur golfer
- Jackson Kowar (born 1996), American baseball player
- Jackson Kuwatch (born 2003), American football player
- Jackson LaCombe (born 2001), American ice hockey player
- Jackson Lam, Singaporean politician
- Jackson Lane (born 1997 or 1998), American government official
- Jackson Santos Laurentino (born 1999), Brazilian footballer
- T. J. Jackson Lears (born 1947), American historian
- Jackson Lee (soccer) (born 2001), Australian footballer
- Jackson Lee (racing driver) (born 2002), American racing driver
- Jackson Longridge (born 1995), Scottish footballer
- Jackson Jose Lucas (born 1984), Brazilian footballer
- Jackson Mandago (born 1974), Kenyan politician
- Jackson Manuel, New Zealand footballer
- Jackson Mariñez (born 1990), Dominican boxer
- Jackson Martínez (born 1986), Colombian footballer
- Jackson Mayanja (born 1969), Ugandan footballer and coach
- Jackson McLerran (born 1999), American stock car racing driver
- Jackson Meeks (born 2003), American football player
- Jackson Merrett (born 1993), Australian rules footballer
- Jackson Merrill (born 2003), American baseball player
- Jackson Mitchell (born 2001), American football player
- Jackson Morton (1794–1874), American politician
- Jackson Mthembu (1958–2021), South African politician
- Jackson Muleka (born 1999), Congolese footballer
- Jackson Mutero Chirenje (1935–1988), Zimbabwean historian
- Jackson Nezuh (born 2002), American baseball player
- Jackson Ngiraingas, Palauan politician and businessman
- Jackson Ormond (born 1990), New Zealand rugby union player
- Jackson Pace (born 1999), American actor
- Jackson Page (born 2001), Welsh snooker player
- Jackson Paine (born 1993), Australian rules footballer
- William Jackson Palmer (1836–1909), American civil engineer and veteran of the American Civil War
- Jackson Gonçalves Pereira (born 1988), Brazilian footballer
- Jackson Pollock (1912–1956), American painter
- Jackson Porozo (born 2000), Ecuadorian footballer
- Jackson Powers-Johnson (born 2003), American football player
- Jackson Proskow (born 1982), Canadian journalist
- Jackson Ragen (born 1998), American soccer player
- Jackson Raine (born 1974), Australian actor
- Jackson Rathbone (born 1984), American actor, singer, and musician
- Jackson Tibolla Rodrigues (born 1990), Brazilian footballer
- Jackson Rohm (c. 1971–2023), American country and pop musician
- Jackson Rowe (born 1997), Canadian basketball player
- Jackson Rutledge (born 1999), American baseball player
- Jackson Robert Scott (born 2008), American actor
- Jackson Shelstad (born 2005), American college basketball player
- Jackson Coelho Silva (born 1973), Brazilian footballer
- Jackson Ferreira Silvério (born 1991), Brazilian footballer
- Jackson Sirmon (born 2000), American football player
- Jackson William Smith (born 2001), English footballer
- Jackson de Sousa (born 1990), Brazilian footballer
- Jackson de Souza (born 1990), Brazilian footballer
- Jackson J. Spielvogel (born 1939), American historian
- Jackson T. Stephens (1923–2005), American oilman and investment banker
- Jackson Stormo (born 1999), American basketball player
- Jackson Tate (1898–1978), American United States Navy admiral
- Jackson Taylor (born 1991 or 1992), Australian politician
- Jackson Todd (born 1951), American baseball player
- Jackson Topine (born 2001), New Zealand rugby league footballer
- Jackson Trengove (born 1990), Australian footballer
- Jackson Wälti (born 1999), American footballer
- Jackson Wang (born 1994), Hong Kong rapper
- Jackson Weaver (1920–1992), American broadcaster and voice actor
- Jackson James White (born 1996), American actor
- Jackson Williams (born 1986), American baseball player
- Jackson Withrow (born 1993), American tennis player
- Jackson Wolf (born 1999), American baseball player
- Jackson Woodard (born 2002), American football player
- Jackson Wray (born 1990), English rugby union player
- Jackson Yee (born 2000), Chinese singer, dancer and actor
- Jackson Yueill (born 1997), American soccer player

== Fictional characters ==
- Jackson Avery, in the television series Grey's Anatomy
- Jackson Belleville, in the TV series Gilmore Girls
- Jackson Bentley, in the 1962 film Lawrence of Arabia
- Jackson Briggs or Jax, in the Mortal Kombat fighting game series
- Jackson Stewart, in the TV series Hannah Montana
- Jackson Storm, in the Pixar film Cars 3
- Jackson "Jax" Teller, in the TV series Sons of Anarchy

== See also ==
- Jackson (disambiguation)
- Jackson (surname)
