= 2017 Florida Gators baseball team =

NCAA Division 1 college baseball season

2017 Florida Gators baseball

National champions SEC regular season co-champions Gainesville Regional champions Gainesville Super Regional champions

College World Series champions 2–0 in CWS Finals
- Conference: Southeastern Conference

Ranking
- Coaches: No. 1
- CB: No. 1
- Record: 52–19 (21–9 SEC)
- Head coach: Kevin O'Sullivan (10th year)
- Assistant coach: Craig Bell (10th year); Brad Weitzel (10th year)
- Home stadium: Alfred A. McKethan Stadium

2017 Southeastern Conference baseball standings
	Conf.						Overall
Team	W		L		T	PCT	W		L		T	PCT
Eastern
No. 1 Florida ^{x}‍†‍‍^{y}	21	–	9	–	0	.700	52	–	19	–	0	.732
No. 10 Kentucky ‍‍‍^{y}	19	–	11	–	0	.633	43	–	23	–	0	.652
No. 15 Vanderbilt ‍‍‍^{y}	15	–	13	–	1	.534	36	–	25	–	1	.589
Missouri ‍‍‍	14	–	16	–	0	.467	36	–	23	–	0	.610
South Carolina ‍‍‍	13	–	17	–	0	.433	35	–	25	–	0	.583
Georgia ‍‍‍	11	–	19	–	0	.367	25	–	32	–	0	.439
Tennessee ‍‍‍	7	–	21	–	0	.250	27	–	25	–	0	.519
Western
No. 2 LSU ^{x}‍†‍‡‍^{y}	21	–	9	–	0	.700	52	–	20	–	0	.722
No. 22 Arkansas ‍‍‍^{y}	18	–	11	–	0	.621	45	–	19	–	0	.703
No. 13 Mississippi State ‍‍‍^{y}	17	–	13	–	0	.567	40	–	27	–	0	.597
No. 8 Texas A&M ‍‍‍^{y}	16	–	14	–	0	.533	41	–	23	–	0	.641
No. 29 Auburn ‍‍‍^{y}	16	–	14	–	0	.533	37	–	26	–	0	.587
Ole Miss ‍‍‍	14	–	16	–	0	.467	32	–	25	–	0	.561
Alabama ‍‍‍	5	–	24	–	1	.183	19	–	34	–	1	.361
x – Division champion † – Conference champion ‡ – Tournament champion y – Invited to the NCAA tournament Rankings from Collegiate Baseball

The 2017 Florida Gators baseball team represented the University of Florida in the sport of baseball during the 2017 college baseball season. The Gators competed in the Eastern Division of the Southeastern Conference (SEC). They played their home games at Alfred A. McKethan Stadium on the university's Gainesville, Florida campus. The team was coached by Kevin O'Sullivan in his tenth season as Florida head coach. The Gators entered the season hoping to build upon their performance in the 2016 NCAA tournament, where they finished seventh at the 2016 College World Series after losses to eventual national champion Coastal Carolina and Texas Tech. In the 2017 season, the Gators won their first baseball national championship by sweeping LSU two games to none in the championship series.

== Roster ==
=== By player ===
2017 Florida Gators baseball team
Players
Coaches

#	Pos.	Name	B/T	Height	Weight	Year	Home town
35	LHP	Andrew Baker	L/L	5 ft 9 in (1.75 m)	185 lb (84 kg)	Fr	Haines City, FL
32	OF	Keenan Bell	L/L	6 ft 0 in (1.83 m)	230 lb (104 kg)	Fr	Jacksonville, FL
13	RHP	Austin Bodrato	L/R	6 ft 0 in (1.83 m)	195 lb (88 kg)	Fr	Montgomery, NY
23	RHP	Nate Brown	R/R	6 ft 1 in (1.85 m)	205 lb (93 kg)	Fr	Hartland, WI
17	RHP	Michael Byrne	R/R	6 ft 2 in (1.88 m)	205 lb (93 kg)	So	Orlando, FL
18	RHP	Tyler Dyson	R/R	6 ft 2 in (1.88 m)	230 lb (104 kg)	Fr	Bradenton, FL
21	RHP	Alex Faedo	R/R	6 ft 5 in (1.96 m)	220 lb (100 kg)	Jr	Tampa, FL
5	INF	Dalton Guthrie	R/R	6 ft 0 in (1.83 m)	185 lb (84 kg)	Jr	Sarasota, FL
9	INF	Christian Hicks	L/R	6 ft 4 in (1.93 m)	210 lb (95 kg)	Jr	St. Augustine, FL
26	LHP	Nick Horvath	S/L	5 ft 11 in (1.8 m)	175 lb (79 kg)	Jr	Jupiter, FL
6	INF	Jonathan India	R/R	6 ft 0 in (1.83 m)	195 lb (88 kg)	So	Coral Springs, FL
28	C	Mark Kolozsvary	R/R	5 ft 9 in (1.75 m)	190 lb (86 kg)	Jr	Tavares, FL
37	RHP	Jackson Kowar	R/R	6 ft 5 in (1.96 m)	180 lb (82 kg)	So	Charlotte, NC
44	OF	Austin Langworthy	L/L	5 ft 9 in (1.75 m)	190 lb (86 kg)	Fr	Williston, FL
66	OF	Ryan Larson	R/R	6 ft 0 in (1.83 m)	190 lb (86 kg)	Sr	Orlando, FL
10	RHP	David Lee	R/R	6 ft 4 in (1.93 m)	190 lb (86 kg)	Jr	Gainesville, FL
8	INF	Deacon Liput	L/R	5 ft 10 in (1.78 m)	190 lb (86 kg)	So	Oviedo, FL
34	RHP	Nick Long	R/R	6 ft 0 in (1.83 m)	195 lb (88 kg)	Fr	Sarasota, FL
27	OF	Nelson Maldonado	R/R	5 ft 10 in (1.78 m)	195 lb (88 kg)	So	Tampa, FL
36	LHP	Cole Maye	L/L	6 ft 7 in (2.01 m)	220 lb (100 kg)	Fr	Huntersville, NC
20	RHP	Bill McKay	R/R	5 ft 11 in (1.8 m)	205 lb (93 kg)	Fr	Plant City, FL
52	RHP	Kirby McMullen	R/R	5 ft 11 in (1.8 m)	195 lb (88 kg)	Fr	Ocala, FL
3	INF	Garrett Milchin	L/R	6 ft 5 in (1.96 m)	210 lb (95 kg)	Fr	Windermere, FL
12	INF	Blake Reese	S/R	5 ft 11 in (1.8 m)	180 lb (82 kg)	So	Tallahassee, FL
4	C	Mike Rivera	R/R	5 ft 10 in (1.78 m)	205 lb (93 kg)	Jr	Venice, FL
39	RHP	Frank Rubio	R/R	6 ft 0 in (1.83 m)	190 lb (86 kg)	Sr	Miami Shores, FL
22	C	J.J. Schwarz	R/R	6 ft 2 in (1.88 m)	215 lb (98 kg)	Jr	Palm Beach Gardens, FL
51	RHP	Brady Singer	R/R	6 ft 5 in (1.96 m)	200 lb (91 kg)	So	Eustis, FL
24	RHP	Cam Weinberger	R/R	6 ft 1 in (1.85 m)	215 lb (98 kg)	Fr	Boca Raton, FL

Head coach

7 Kevin O'Sullivan

Assistant coach(es)

33 Craig Bell
42 Brad Weitzel

Legend

- (C) Team captain
- (S) Suspended
- (I) Ineligible
- Injured
- Current redshirt

Roster

=== By position ===
2017 Florida Gators roster
Pitchers: 3 – Garrett Milchin – Freshman; 10 – David Lee – Junior; 13 – Austin Bodrato – Freshman; 17 – Michael Byrne – Sophomore; 18 – Tyler Dyson – Freshman; 20 – Billy McKay – Freshman; 21 – Alex Faedo – Junior; 23 – Nate Brown – Freshman; 24 – Cam Weinberger – Freshman; 26 – Nick Horvath – Junior; 34 – Nick Long – Freshman; 35 – Andrew Baker – Freshman; 36 – Cole Maye – Freshman; 37 – Jackson Kowar – Sophomore; 39 – Frank Rubio – Senior; 44 – Austin Langworthy – Freshman; 51 – Brady Singer – Sophomore; 52 – Kirby McMullen – Freshman	Catchers: 4 – Mike Rivera – Junior; 22 – J. J. Schwarz – Junior; 28 – Mark Kolozsvary – Junior; Infielders: 3 – Garrett Milchin – Freshman; 5 – Dalton Guthrie – Junior; 6 – Jonathan India – Sophomore; 8 – Deacon Liput – Sophomore; 9 – Christian Hicks – Junior; 12 – Blake Reese – Sophomore; 18 – Tyler Dyson – Freshman; 27 – Nelson Maldonado – Sophomore; 32 – Keenan Bell – Freshman	Outfielders: 13 – Austin Bodrato – Freshman; 26 – Nick Horvath – Junior; 27 – Nelson Maldonado – Sophomore; 32 – Keenan Bell – Freshman; 35 – Andrew Baker – Freshman; 44 – Austin Langworthy – Freshman; 52 – Kirby McMullen – Freshman; 66 – Ryan Larson – Senior

== Coaching staff ==
Coaching Staff
- 7 – Kevin O'Sullivan – Head coach – 10th year
- 33 – Craig Bell – Assistant coach – 10th year
- 42 – Brad Weitzel – Assistant coach – 10th year
- 31 – Lars Davis – Volunteer assistant coach – 3rd year
- Jon Michelini – Athletic trainer – 4th year
- Paul Chandler – Strength & conditioning coordinator – 8th year

== Schedule ==
Legend
	Florida win
	Florida loss
	Postponement
**Bold**	Florida team member

2017 Florida Gators baseball game log
Regular season
February

Date	Opponent	Rank	Stadium Site	Score	Win	Loss	Save	Attendance	Overall Record	SEC Record
February 17	William & Mary	No. 2	McKethan Stadium; Gainesville, FL	5–4	**Byrne** (1–0)	Raquet (0–1)	None	5,402	1–0	–
February 18	William & Mary	No. 2	McKethan Stadium	8–1	**Singer** (1–0)	Sheehan (0–1)	None	3,817	2–0	–
February 19	William & Mary	No. 2	McKethan Stadium	11–6	**Kowar** (1–0)	Powers (0–1)	None	4,408	3–0	–
February 21	at Jacksonville	No. 2	Sessions Stadium; Jacksonville, FL	2–3	Santana (1–0)	**Baker** (0–1)	None	1,537	3–1	–
February 22	Jacksonville	No. 2	McKethan Stadium	Postponed (rain) Makeup: May 3						
February 24	No. 17 Miami (FL); Rivalry	No. 2	McKethan Stadium	1–0	**Faedo** (1–0)	Lepore (1–1)	**Rubio** (1)	5,385	4–1	–
February 25	No. 17 Miami (FL); Rivalry	No. 2	McKethan Stadium	2–0	**Singer** (2–0)	Bargfeldt (1–1)	**Rubio** (2)	6,160	5–1	–
February 26	No. 17 Miami (FL); Rivalry	No. 2	McKethan Stadium	6–2	**Kowar** (2–0)	Mediavilla (0–2)	None	5,262	6–1	–
February 28	UCF	No. 2	McKethan Stadium	4–3	**Brown** (1–0)	Williams (0–1)	**Horvath** (1)	3,471	7–1	–

March

Date	Opponent	Rank	Stadium Site	Score	Win	Loss	Save	Attendance	Overall Record	SEC Record
March 1	at UCF	No. 2	John Euliano Park; Orlando, FL	2–11	Sheridan (2–0)	**Byrne** (1–1)	None	3,852	7–2	–
March 3	Columbia	No. 2	McKethan Stadium	7–0	**Faedo** (2–0)	Abrams (0–1)	None	3,378	8–2	–
March 4	Columbia	No. 2	McKethan Stadium	7–2	**Dyson** (1–0)	Bahm (0–1)	None	3,661	9–2	–
March 5	Columbia	No. 2	McKethan Stadium	8–4	**Kowar** (3–0)	Egly (0–1)	None	3,675	10–2	–
March 7	at Florida Gulf Coast	No. 2	JetBlue Park; Fort Myers, FL	3–7	Leon (1–1)	**Byrne** (1–2)	None	2,717	10–3	–
March 8	Florida Gulf Coast	No. 2	McKethan Stadium	2–3	Gray (1–0)	**Langworthy** (0–1)	Koerner (4)	2,943	10–4	–
March 10	Seton Hall	No. 2	McKethan Stadium	8–0	**Faedo** (3–0)	McCarthy (0–3)	None	3,413	11–4	–
March 11 (1)	Seton Hall	No. 2	McKethan Stadium	2–3^{13}	Testani (1–0)	**Milchin** (0–1)	Pacillo (1)	3,668	11–5	–
March 11 (2)	Seton Hall	No. 2	McKethan Stadium	4–3	**McMullen** (1–0)	Politi (0–1)	**Byrne** (1)	3,113	12–5	–
March 14	No. 3 Florida State; Rivalry	No. 5	McKethan Stadium	1–0	**Baker** (1–1)	Karp (0–1)	**Dyson** (1)	5,806	13–5	–
March 17	at Auburn	No. 5	Plainsman Park; Auburn, AL	3–14	Thompson (4–0)	**Faedo** (3–1)	None	2,563	13–6	0–1
March 18	at Auburn	No. 5	Plainsman Park	1–2	Mize (3–0)	**Singer** (2–1)	Lipscomb (3)	2,901	13–7	0–2
March 19	at Auburn	No. 5	Plainsman Park	5–6	Mitchell (4–0)	**Rubio** (0–1)	None	3,302	13–8	0–3
March 21	at Stetson	No. 12	Melching Field; DeLand, FL	9–8^{11}	**McMullen** (2–0)	Onyshko (1–3)	None	1,727	14–8	–
March 24	No. 4 LSU	No. 12	McKethan Stadium	1–0	**Faedo** (4–1)	Lange (3–2)	**Dyson** (2)	4,485	15–8	1–3
March 25	No. 4 LSU	No. 12	McKethan Stadium	8–1	**Singer** (3–1)	Poché (5–1)	None	4,751	16–8	2–3
March 26	No. 4 LSU	No. 12	McKethan Stadium	6–10	Bush (1–0)	**Baker** (1–2)	Gilbert (3)	3,811	16–9	2–4
March 28	vs. No. 10 Florida State; Rivalry	No. 9	Baseball Grounds; Jacksonville, FL	4–1	**Milchin** (1–1)	Karp (0–2)	**Byrne** (2)	8,924	17–9	–
March 31	at No. 23 Missouri	No. 9	Taylor Stadium; Columbia, MO	4–3	**Faedo** (5–1)	Houck (3–3)	**Byrne** (3)	1,034	18–9	3–4

April

Date	Opponent	Rank	Stadium Site	Score	Win	Loss	Save	Attendance	Overall Record	SEC Record
April 1	at No. 23 Missouri	No. 9	Taylor Stadium	2–1	**Singer** (4–1)	Plassmeyer (4–1)	None	1,264	19–9	4–4
April 2	at No. 23 Missouri	No. 9	Taylor Stadium	2–1	**Kowar** (4–0)	Montes de Oca (2–1)	**Byrne** (4)	658	20–9	5–4
April 4	Stetson	No. 7	McKethan Stadium	Canceled (rain)						
April 7	Tennessee	No. 7	McKethan Stadium	6–7^{10}	Linginfelter (2–3)	**Byrne** (1–3)	Lipinski (2)	3,894	20–10	5–5
April 8	Tennessee	No. 7	McKethan Stadium	2–3^{10}	Lipinski (3–0)	**Byrne** (1–4)	None	5,776	20–11	5–6
April 9	Tennessee	No. 7	McKethan Stadium	5–4	**Kowar** (5–0)	Linginfelter (2–4)	**Byrne** (5)	3,894	21–11	6–6
April 11	at No. 25 Florida State; Rivalry	No. 10	Dick Howser Stadium; Tallahassee, FL	10–7	**Horvath** (1–0)	Haney (1–2)	None	5,944	22–11	–
April 13	at Vanderbilt	No. 10	Hawkins Field; Nashville, TN	10–6	**Milchin** (2–1)	Hayes (0–1)	None	3,148	23–11	7–6
April 14	at Vanderbilt	No. 10	Hawkins Field	0–2	Wright (2–4)	**Singer** (4–2)	None	3,626	23–12	7–7
April 15	at Vanderbilt	No. 10	Hawkins Field	20–8	**Kowar** (6–0)	Fellows (3–2)	None	3,626	24–12	8–7
April 18	North Florida	No. 10	McKethan Stadium	2–1	**Rubio** (1–1)	Howze (2–3)	**Byrne** (6)	2,777	25–12	–
April 20	No. 18 South Carolina	No. 10	McKethan Stadium	1–0	**Faedo** (6–1)	Schmidt (4–2)	**Byrne** (7)	3,254	26–12	9–7
April 21	No. 18 South Carolina	No. 10	McKethan Stadium	2–4	Crowe (4–3)	**Singer** (4–3)	Johnson (6)	4,384	26–13	9–8
April 22	No. 18 South Carolina	No. 10	McKethan Stadium	7–5	**Milchin** (3–1)	Bowers (3–1)	**Byrne** (8)	3,604	27–13	10–8
April 28	at Georgia	No. 8	Foley Field; Athens, GA	6–4	**Milchin** (4–1)	Glover (0–2)	**Byrne** (9)	2,126	28–13	11–8
April 29	at Georgia	No. 8	Foley Field	6–3	**Singer** (5–3)	Adkins (5–5)	**Byrne** (10)	3,082	29–13	12–8
April 30	at Georgia	No. 8	Foley Field	4–3	**Kowar** (7–0)	Smith (2–5)	**Byrne** (11)	1,945	30–13	13–8

May

Date	Opponent	Rank	Stadium Site	Score	Win	Loss	Save	Attendance	Overall Record	SEC Record
May 2	Florida A&M	No. 7	McKethan Stadium	8–7	**McMullen** (3–0)	Wilson (0–4)	**Milchin** (1)	3,238	31–13	–
May 3	Jacksonville	No. 7	McKethan Stadium	6–2	**Horvath** (2–0)	Potter (2–2)	None	2,760	32–13	–
May 5	Ole Miss	No. 7	McKethan Stadium	11–2	**Faedo** (7–1)	McArthur (3–4)	None	3,447	33–13	14–8
May 6	Ole Miss	No. 7	McKethan Stadium	7–4	**Horvath** (3–0)	Woolfolk (3–2)	**Byrne** (12)	4,227	34–13	15–8
May 7	Ole Miss	No. 7	McKethan Stadium	6–4	**Kowar** (8–0)	Parkinson (5–3)	**Byrne** (13)	3,747	35–13	16–8
May 9	No. 23 South Florida	No. 5	McKethan Stadium	10–15	Roberts (3–0)	**Milchin** (4–2)	None	3,114	35–14	–
May 12	at Alabama	No. 5	Sewell–Thomas Stadium; Tuscaloosa, AL	2–1	**Byrne** (2–4)	Suchey (2–7)	None	3,143	36–14	17–8
May 13	at Alabama	No. 5	Sewell–Thomas Stadium	13–6	**Singer** (6–3)	Duarte (2–6)	None	3,948	37–14	18–8
May 14	at Alabama	No. 5	Sewell–Thomas Stadium	10–5	**Kowar** (9–0)	Eicholtz (1–3)	None	4,288	38–14	19–8
May 18	No. 7 Kentucky	No. 5	McKethan Stadium	4–12	Hjelle (9–2)	**Faedo** (7–2)	None	3,693	38–15	19–9
May 19	No. 7 Kentucky	No. 5	McKethan Stadium	14–3	**Singer** (7–3)	Logue (6–5)	None	4,153	39–15	20–9
May 20	No. 7 Kentucky	No. 5	McKethan Stadium	6–4	**Kowar** (10–0)	Lewis (6–3)	None	3,938	40–15	21–9

Postseason
SEC Tournament

Date	Opponent	Rank	Stadium Site	Score	Win	Loss	Save	Attendance	Overall Record	SECT Record
May 24	vs. No. 24 (8) Auburn	No. 4 (1)	Metropolitan Stadium; Hoover, AL	5–4	**Dyson** (2–0)	Coker (3–3)	**Byrne** (14)	6,890	41–15	1–0
May 26	vs. No. 19 (5) Mississippi State	No. 4 (1)	Metropolitan Stadium	12–3	**Kowar** (11–0)	Self (5–1)	None	6,988	42–15	2–0
May 27	vs. No. 13 (4) Arkansas	No. 4 (1)	Metropolitan Stadium	0–16^{7}	Murphy (5–0)	**Singer** (7–4)	None	10,793	42–16	2–1

NCAA tournament: Gainesville Regional

Date	Opponent	Rank	Stadium Site	Score	Win	Loss	Save	Attendance	Overall Record	Regional Record
June 2	(4) Marist	No. 4 (1)	McKethan Stadium	10–6	**Kowar** (12–0)	Keenan (6–1)	**Byrne** (15)	2,390	43–16	1–0
June 3	(2) South Florida	No. 4 (1)	McKethan Stadium	5–1^{12}	**Byrne** (3–4)	Perez (6–3)	None	2,954	44–16	2–0
June 4	(3) Bethune–Cookman	No. 4 (1)	McKethan Stadium	2–6	Densmore (2–1)	**Singer** (7–5)	Maldonado (1)	2,077	44–17	2–1
June 5	(3) Bethune–Cookman	No. 4 (1)	McKethan Stadium	6–1	**Langworthy** (1–1)	Calamita (2–3)	**Byrne** (16)	2,166	45–17	3–1

NCAA tournament: Gainesville Super Regional

Date	Opponent	Rank	Stadium Site	Score	Win	Loss	Save	Attendance	Overall Record	Super Reg. Record
June 10	No. 14 Wake Forest	No. 4 (3)	McKethan Stadium	2–1^{11}	**Byrne** (4–4)	Roberts (2–5)	None	3,910	46–17	1–0
June 11	No. 14 Wake Forest	No. 4 (3)	McKethan Stadium	6–8^{11^{[a]}}	Peluse (5–1)	**Byrne** (4–5)	None	3,381	46–18	1–1
June 12	No. 14 Wake Forest	No. 4 (3)	McKethan Stadium	3–0	**Dyson** (3–0)	McCarren (5–4)	**Faedo** (1)	3,381	47–18	2–1
^{^[a]}The game was suspended during the fifth inning due to rain and continued at 1:04 p.m. on June 12 prior to the start of the game scheduled for that day.

College World Series

Date	Opponent	Rank	Stadium Site	Score	Win	Loss	Save	Attendance	Overall Record	CWS Record
June 18	vs. No. 7 (6) TCU	No. 4 (3)	TD Ameritrade Park; Omaha, NE	3–0	**Faedo** (8–2)	Janczak (9–1)	**Byrne** (17)	23,543	48–18	1–0
June 20	vs. No. 6 (7) Louisville	No. 4 (3)	TD Ameritrade Park	5–1	**Singer** (8–5)	McClure (8–4)	None	22,222	49–18	2–0
June 23	vs. No. 7 (6) TCU	No. 4 (3)	TD Ameritrade Park	2–9	King (1–3)	**Kowar** (12–1)	None	25,329	49–19	2–1
June 24	vs. No. 7 (6) TCU	No. 4 (3)	TD Ameritrade Park	3–0	**Faedo** (9–2)	Janczak (9–2)	**Byrne** (18)	18,093	50–19	3–1
Championship Series										Record
June 26	vs. No. 3 (4) LSU	No. 4 (3)	TD Ameritrade Park	4–3	**Singer** (9–5)	Reynolds (1–2)	**Byrne** (19)	25,679	51–19	1–0
June 27	vs. No. 3 (4) LSU	No. 4 (3)	TD Ameritrade Park	6–1	**Dyson** (4–0)	Poché (12–4)	**Kowar** (1)	26,607	52–19	2–0

Rankings from USA Today/ESPN Top 25 coaches' baseball poll. All times Eastern. Parentheses indicate tournament seedings. Retrieved from FloridaGators.com

== Record vs. conference opponents ==
Last two do not qualify for conf. tourn. Blank are not scheduled. Blue are home games, otherwise away.

2017 SEC baseball records Source: 2017 SEC baseball game results
Team	W–L	ALA	ARK	AUB	FLA	UGA	KEN	LSU	MSU	MIZZ	MISS	SCAR	TENN	TAMU	VAN	Team	Div	SR	SW
ALA	5–24		1–2	3–0	0–3	.	.	0–3	0–3	0–3	0–3	1–2	.	0–3	0–2	ALA	W7	1–9	1–6
ARK	18–11	2–1		1–2	.	3–0	.	1–2	3–0	2–1	1–2	.	1–1	2–1	2–1	ARK	W2	6–3	2–0
AUB	16–14	0–3	2–1		3–0	2–1	.	0–3	2–1	.	2–1	2–1	2–1	1–2	.	AUB	W5	7–3	1–2
FLA	21–9	3–0	.	0–3		3–0	2–1	2–1	.	3–0	3–0	2–1	1–2	.	2–1	FLA	E1	8–2	4–1
UGA	11–19	.	0–3	1–2	0–3		2–1	0–3	2–1	1–2	.	2–1	2–1	.	1–2	UGA	E6	4–6	0–3
KEN	19–11	.	.	.	1–2	1–2		2–1	1–2	2–1	2–1	2–1	3–0	3–0	2–1	KEN	E2	7–3	2–0
LSU	21–9	3–0	2–1	3–0	1–2	3–0	1–2		3–0	.	2–1	2–1	.	1–2	.	LSU	W1	7–3	4–0
MSU	17–13	3–0	0–3	1–2	.	1–2	2–1	0–3		.	3–0	2–1	3–0	2–1	.	MSU	W3	6–4	3–2
MIZZ	14–16	3–0	1–2	.	0–3	2–1	1–2	.	.		1–2	2–1	3–0	0–3	1–2	MIZZ	E4	4–6	2–2
MISS	14–16	3–0	2–1	1–2	0–3	.	1–2	1–2	0–3	2–1		.	.	2–1	2–1	MISS	W6	5–5	1–2
SCAR	13–17	2–1	.	1–2	1–2	1–2	1–2	1–2	1–2	1–2	.		3–0	.	1–2	SCAR	E5	2–8	1–0
TENN	7–21	.	1–1	1–2	2–1	1–2	0–3	.	0–3	0–3	.	0–3		1–2	1–1	TENN	E7	1–7	0–4
TAMU	16–14	3–0	1–2	2–1	.	.	0–3	2–1	1–2	3–0	1–2	.	2–1		1–2	TAMU	W4	5–5	2–1
VAN	15–13	2–0	1–2	.	1–2	2–1	1–2	.	.	2–1	1–2	2–1	1–1	2–1		VAN	E3	5–4	0–0
Team	W–L	ALA	ARK	AUB	FLA	UGA	KEN	LSU	MSU	MIZZ	MISS	SCAR	TENN	TAMU	VAN	Team	Div	SR	SW

Updated for entire regular season. Alabama and Vanderbilt had one tie game.

== Rankings ==
Ranking movements Legend: ██ Increase in ranking ██ Decrease in ranking ( ) = First-place votes
	Week																		
Poll	Pre	1	2	3	4	5	6	7	8	9	10	11	12	13	14	15	16	17	Final
Coaches'	2 (4)	2 (4)*	2 (4)*	2 (1)	5 (1)	12	9	7	10	10	8	7	5	5	4	4	4*	4*	1 (27)
Baseball America	3	3	3	3	5	13	8	8	16	15	11	11	7	5	4	5	5*	5*	1
Collegiate Baseball^	3	3	2	2	8	17	11	10	18	16	13	10	7	4	2	3	3	3	1
NCBWA†	2	2	2	2	5	11	9	7	12	13	11	10	6	5	3	4	4	4*	1

^ Collegiate Baseball ranked 40 teams in their preseason poll, but only ranked 30 teams weekly during the season.
† NCBWA ranks 30 teams in their preseason poll, but only ranks 25 teams weekly during the season.
* A new poll was not released for this week, so for comparison purposes, the previous week's ranking is inserted in this week's slot.
