= 2017 Mississippi State Bulldogs baseball team =

American college baseball season

2017 Mississippi State Bulldogs baseball

Hattiesburg Regional champions
- Conference: Southeastern Conference
- Western Division

Ranking
- Coaches: No. 12
- CB: No. 14
- Record: 40–27 (17–13 SEC)
- Head coach: Andy Cannizaro (1st season)
- Home stadium: Dudy Noble Field

2017 Southeastern Conference baseball standings
	Conf.						Overall
Team	W		L		T	PCT	W		L		T	PCT
Eastern
No. 1 Florida ^{x}‍†‍‍^{y}	21	–	9	–	0	.700	52	–	19	–	0	.732
No. 10 Kentucky ‍‍‍^{y}	19	–	11	–	0	.633	43	–	23	–	0	.652
No. 15 Vanderbilt ‍‍‍^{y}	15	–	13	–	1	.534	36	–	25	–	1	.589
Missouri ‍‍‍	14	–	16	–	0	.467	36	–	23	–	0	.610
South Carolina ‍‍‍	13	–	17	–	0	.433	35	–	25	–	0	.583
Georgia ‍‍‍	11	–	19	–	0	.367	25	–	32	–	0	.439
Tennessee ‍‍‍	7	–	21	–	0	.250	27	–	25	–	0	.519
Western
No. 2 LSU ^{x}‍†‍‡‍^{y}	21	–	9	–	0	.700	52	–	20	–	0	.722
No. 22 Arkansas ‍‍‍^{y}	18	–	11	–	0	.621	45	–	19	–	0	.703
No. 13 Mississippi State ‍‍‍^{y}	17	–	13	–	0	.567	40	–	27	–	0	.597
No. 8 Texas A&M ‍‍‍^{y}	16	–	14	–	0	.533	41	–	23	–	0	.641
No. 29 Auburn ‍‍‍^{y}	16	–	14	–	0	.533	37	–	26	–	0	.587
Ole Miss ‍‍‍	14	–	16	–	0	.467	32	–	25	–	0	.561
Alabama ‍‍‍	5	–	24	–	1	.183	19	–	34	–	1	.361
x – Division champion † – Conference champion ‡ – Tournament champion y – Invited to the NCAA tournament Rankings from Collegiate Baseball

The 2017 Mississippi State Bulldogs baseball team represented the Mississippi State University in the 2017 NCAA Division I baseball season. The Bulldogs played their home games at Dudy Noble Field.

== Personnel ==
=== Coaching staff ===
2016 Mississippi State Bulldogs baseball coaching staff
- Andy Cannizaro – Head Coach - 1st year
- Gary Henderson – Pitching Coach, 1st year
- Will Coggin – Assistant Coach - 2nd year
- Lee VanHorn – Coordinator of Baseball Operations - 2nd year
- Mike Brown – Coordinator of Camps/Volunteer Assistant - 1st year

== Schedule and results ==
2017 Mississippi State Bulldogs baseball game log
Regular season (34–22)

February (6–3)
Date	Opponent	Rank	Site/stadium	Score	Win	Loss	Save	TV	Attendance	Overall record	SEC record
Feb. 17	#29 Texas Tech		Dudy Noble Field • Starkville, MS	L 2–5	Steven Gingery (1–0)	Konner Pilkington (0–1)	Jose Quezada (1)	SECN+	10,217	0–1	–
Feb. 18	Western Illinois		Dudy Noble Field • Starkville, MS	W 8–2	Peyton Plumlee (1–0)	Nate Westfahl (0–1)	none	SECN+	10,964	1–1	–
Feb. 19	Western Illinois (DH-1)		Dudy Noble Field • Starkville, MS	W 10–9 ^{11}	Spencer Price (1–0)	Javin Drake (0–1)	none	SECN+	10,583	2–1	–
Feb. 19	#29 Texas Tech (DH-2)		Dudy Noble Field • Starkville, MS	W 8–5	Riley Self (1–0)	Jose Quezada (0–1)	none	SECN+	10,583	3–1	–
Feb. 21	Morehead State		Dudy Noble Field • Starkville, MS	L 8–13	Cable Wright (1–0)	Blake Smith (0–1)	none	SECN+	6,074	3–2	–
Feb. 24	Indiana State		Dudy Noble Field • Starkville, MS	W 11–6	Konnor Pilkington (1–1)	Will Kincanon (0–1)	none	SECN+	7,347	4–2	–
Feb. 25	Marist (DH-1)		Dudy Noble Field • Starkville, MS	W 12–4	Graham Ashcraft (1–0)	John Parisi (1–1)	Spencer Price (1)	SECN+	8,727	5–2	–
Feb. 25	Indiana State (DH-2)		Dudy Noble Field • Starkville, MS	W 9–1	Peyton Plumlee (2–0)	Ryan Keaffaber (0–1)	none	SECN+	8,727	6–2	–
Feb. 26	Marist		Dudy Noble Field • Starkville, MS	L 8–9	Sean Keenan (1–0)	Ryan Cyr (0–1)	Tony Romanelli (2)	SECN+	6,517	6–3	–

March (12–7)
Date	Opponent	Rank	Site/stadium	Score	Win	Loss	Save	TV	Attendance	Overall record	SEC record
Mar. 3	at Oregon		PK Park • Eugene, OR	L 0–1	David Peterson (2–1)	Konnor Pilkington (1–2)	Kenyon Yovan (3)	Pac-12 Network	1,027	6–4	–
Mar. 4	at Oregon		PK Park • Eugene, OR	W 5–4	Riley Self (2–0)	Connor Zwetsch (0–1)	Spencer Price (2)	Pac-12 Network	1,067	7–4	–
Mar. 5	at Oregon		PK Park • Eugene, OR	L 5–6 ^{11}	Kenyon Yovan (1–0)	Spencer Price (1–1)	none	Pac-12 Network	1,348	7–5	–
Mar. 7	Louisiana Tech		Dudy Noble Field • Starkville, MS	L 2–3	Austin Harrison (1–0)	Ryan Rigby (0–1)	Nate Harris (6)	SECN+	6,338	7–6	–
Mar. 10	South Alabama		Dudy Noble Field • Starkville, MS	W 2–0	Konnor Pilkington (2–2)	Thomas Huston (0–1)	Spencer Price (3)	SECN+	6,501	8–6	–
Mar. 11	Columbia		Dudy Noble Field • Starkville, MS	Postponed to 3/13, inclement weather							
Mar. 11	South Alabama		Dudy Noble Field • Starkville, MS	Postponed to 3/12, inclement weather							
Mar. 12	Columbia (DH-1)		Dudy Noble Field • Starkville, MS	W 5–4	Spencer Price (2–1)	Brett Gannaway (0–1)	none	SECN+	6,242	9–6	–
Mar. 12	South Alabama (DH-2)		Dudy Noble Field • Starkville, MS	W 8–6	Graham Ashcraft (2–0)	Avery Geyer (0–1)	Jake Mangum (1)	SECN+	6,242	10–6	–
Mar. 13	Columbia		Dudy Noble Field • Starkville, MS	W 11–8	Cole Gordon (1–0)	Jordan Chriss (0–1)	Trey Jolly (1)		5,765	11–6	–
Mar. 14	Arkansas–Pine Bluff		Dudy Noble Field • Starkville, MS	W 11–8	Jake Mangum (1–0)	Antonie Lustter, II (1–2)	Spencer Price (4)	SECN+	5,940	12–6	–
Mar. 17	at Arkansas		Baum Stadium • Fayetteville, AR	L 1–3	Blaine Knight (2–1)	Konnor Pilkington (2–3)	Cannon Chadwick (1)	SECN	7,230	12–7	0–1
Mar. 18	at Arkansas		Baum Stadium • Fayetteville, AR	L 4–5	Trevor Stephan (4–0)	Peyton Plumlee (2–1)	Cannon Chadwick (2)	SECN	8,341	12–8	0–2
Mar. 19	at Arkansas		Baum Stadium • Fayetteville, AR	L 1–6	Josh Alberius (1–3)	Jake Mangum (1–1)	Dominic Taccolini (1)	SECN+	7,828	12–9	0–3
Mar. 21	vs. #25 Southern Miss		Trustmark Park • Pearl, MS	L 5–7	Taylor Braley (2–0)	Denver McQuary (0–1)	Matt Wallner (2)		5,198	12–10	–
Mar. 24	Tennessee		Dudy Noble Field • Starkville, MS	W 5–4	Jacob Barton (1–0)	Kyle Serrano (0–1)	Spencer Price (5)	SECN+	7,744	13–10	1–3
Mar. 25	Tennessee		Dudy Noble Field • Starkville, MS	W 14–4	Peyton Plumlee (3–1)	Zach Linginfelter (0–2)	none	SECN+	6,335	14–10	2–3
Mar. 26	Tennessee		Dudy Noble Field • Starkville, MS	W 7–4	Riley Self (3–0)	Zach Warren (2–2)	Spencer Price (6)	SECN+	7,395	15–10	3–3
Mar. 28	at Memphis		AutoZone Park • Memphis, TN	W 8–3	Cole Gordon (2–0)	Jonathan Bowlan (2–3)	none		3,031	16–10	–
Mar. 30	at Ole Miss		Swayze Field • Oxford, MS	W 4–3	Riley Self (4–0)	Will Ethridge (1–2)	Spencer Price (7)	ESPNU	8,521	17–10	4–3
Mar. 31	at Ole Miss		Swayze Field • Oxford, MS	W 5–3	Jacob Barton (2–0)	David Parkinson (4–2)	Spencer Price (8)	SECN	11,017	18–10	5–3

April (12–6)
Date	Opponent	Rank	Site/stadium	Score	Win	Loss	Save	TV	Attendance	Overall record	SEC record
April 1	at Ole Miss		Swayze Field • Oxford, MS	W 2–1	Jake Mangum (2–1)	Ryan Rolison (3–1)	Spencer Price (9)	SECN+	11,204	19–10	6–3
April 4	FIU	#19	Dudy Noble Field • Starkville, MS	L 3–8	Robert Garcia (2–4)	Trey Jolly (0–1)	Dominic LoBrutto (2)	SECN+	6,369	19–11	–
April 5	FIU	#19	Dudy Noble Field • Starkville, MS	W 9–7 ^{10}	Spencer Price (3–1)	Cain Spangler (0–1)	none	SECN+	6,979	20–11	–
April 7	#15 Kentucky	#19	Dudy Noble Field • Starkville, MS	L 2–5	Logan Salow (1–2)	Trysten Barlow (0–1)	none	SECN+	9,256	20–12	6–4
April 8	#15 Kentucky	#19	Dudy Noble Field • Starkville, MS	W 10–6	Peyton Plumlee (4–1)	Zach Logue (5–2)	none	SECN+	13,691	21–12	7–4
April 9	#15 Kentucky	#19	Dudy Noble Field • Starkville, MS	W 10–6	Trey Jolly (1–1)	Justin Lewis (4–2)	Spencer Price (10)	SECN+	8,082	22–12	8–4
April 11	Mississippi Valley State	#15	Dudy Noble Field • Starkville, MS	W 5–0	Jacob Billingsley (1–0)	Dustin Stewart (2–6)	Spencer Price (11)	SECN+	6,531	23–12	–
April 14	at #13 South Carolina	#15	Founders Park • Columbia, SC	W 7–4	Konnor Pilkington (3–3)	Clarke Schmidt (4–1)	Spencer Price (12)	SECN+	7,281	24–12	9–4
April 15	at #13 South Carolina	#15	Founders Park • Columbia, SC	W 5–4	Trey Jolly (2–1)	Wil Crowe (3–3)	Spencer Price (13)	SECN+	7,708	25–12	10–4
April 16	at #13 South Carolina	#15	Founders Park • Columbia, SC	L 1–6	Josh Reagan (4–1)	Trysten Barlow (0–2)	none	SECN	6,612	25–13	10–5
April 18	at South Alabama	#14	Eddie Stanky Field • Mobile, AL	L 2–5	Sean Trimble (2–0)	Parker Ford (0–1)	Matt Peacock (5)		3,104	25–14	–
April 20	Alabama	#14	Dudy Noble Field • Starkville, MS	W 6–5	Konnor Pilkington (4–3)	Dylan Duarte (2–4)	Spencer Price (14)	SECN	6,890	26–14	11–5
April 21	Alabama (DH-1)	#14	Dudy Noble Field • Starkville, MS	W 4–3	Peyton Plumlee (5–1)	Nick Eicholtz (1–1)	Riley Self (1)	SECN+	8,270	27–14	12–5
April 21	Alabama (DH-2)	#14	Dudy Noble Field • Starkville, MS	W 13–12 ^{13}	Brant Blaylock (1–0)	Tyler Adams (0–1)	none	SECN+	8,270	28–14	13–5
April 22	Alabama	#14	Dudy Noble Field • Starkville, MS	Moved to 4/21, impending weather							
April 25	vs. Ole Miss	#7	Trustmark Park • Pearl, MS	W 4–2	Denver McQuary (1–1)	Greer Holston (2–3)	Riley Self (2)	SECN	8,536	29–14	–
April 28	#8 Auburn	#7	Dudy Noble Field • Starkville, MS	W 5–2	Konnor Pilkington (5–3)	Keegan Thompson (5–2)	Riley Self (3)	SECN+	8,280	30–14	14–5
April 29	#8 Auburn (DH-1)	#7	Dudy Noble Field • Starkville, MS	L 8–17	Cole Lipscomb (4–0)	Cole Gordon (2–1)	none	SECN+	9,919	30–15	14–6
April 29	#8 Auburn (DH-2)	#7	Dudy Noble Field • Starkville, MS	L 3–5	Elliott Anderson (1–0)	Jacob Billingsley (1–1)	Calvin Coker (2)	SECN	9,919	30–16	14–7
April 30	#8 Auburn	#7	Dudy Noble Field • Starkville, MS	Moved to 4/29, impending weather							

May (4–6)
Date	Opponent	Rank	Site/stadium	Score	Win	Loss	Save	TV	Attendance	Overall record	SEC record
May 4	at #29 Texas A&M	#7	Olsen Field at Blue Bell Park • College Station, TX	L 2–9	Brigham Hill (7–3)	Konnor Pilkington (5–4)	none	ESPNU	4,417	30–17	14–8
May 5	at #29 Texas A&M	#7	Olsen Field at Blue Bell Park • College Station, TX	W 5–1	Denver McQuary (2–1)	Corbin Martin (5–3)	Cole Gordon (1)	SECN+	5,490	31–17	15–8
May 6	at #29 Texas A&M	#7	Olsen Field at Blue Bell Park • College Station, TX	W 4–3	Riley Self (5–0)	Mitchell Kilkenny (3–2)	none	ESPNU	6,295	32–17	16–8
May 12	at Georgia	#6	Foley Field • Athens, GA	W 9–3	Konnor Pilkington (6–4)	Andrew Gist (2–4)	none	SECN+	1,781	33–17	17–8
May 13	at Georgia	#6	Foley Field • Athens, GA	L 1–4	Kevin Smith (4–5)	Denver McQuary (2–2)	Zac Kristofak (2)	SECN	2,504	33–18	17–9
May 14	at Georgia	#6	Foley Field • Athens, GA	L 1–4	Chase Adkins (6–6)	Jacob Billingsley (1–2)	Drew Moody (2)	SECN+	1,938	33–19	17–10
May 16	Troy	#9	Dudy Noble Field • Starkville, MS	W 10–8	Trey Jolly (3–1)	Marc Skinner (4–6)	Riley Self (4)	SECN+	6,223	34–19	–
May 18	#5 LSU	#9	Dudy Noble Field • Starkville, MS	L 1–3	Alex Lange (7–5)	Konnor Pilkington (6–5)	Hunter Newman (9)	SECN	7,613	34–20	17–11
May 19	#5 LSU	#9	Dudy Noble Field • Starkville, MS	L 5–11	Jared Poche' (9–3)	Denver McQuary (2–3)	Zack Hess (1)	SECN+	9,434	34–21	17–12
May 20	#5 LSU	#9	Dudy Noble Field • Starkville, MS	L 7–11	Caleb Gilbert (3–1)	Cole Gordon (2–2)	none	SECN	9,007	34–22	17–13

Postseason (6–5)

SEC Tournament (2–2)
Date	Opponent	Rank	Site/stadium	Score	Win	Loss	Save	TV	Attendance	Overall record	SECT Record
May 23	vs. (12) Georgia	(5) #21	Hoover Metropolitan Stadium • Hoover, AL	Postponed to 5/24, inclement weather							
May 24	vs. (12) Georgia	(5) #21	Hoover Metropolitan Stadium • Hoover, AL	W 3–0	Konnor Pilkington (7–5)	Chase Adkins (6–7)	Riley Self (5)	SECN	5,062	35–22	1–0
May 25	vs. (4) #13 Arkansas	(5) #21	Hoover Metropolitan Stadium • Hoover, AL	W 4–3	Peyton Plumlee (6–1)	Cannon Chadwick (4–3)	Riley Self (6)	SECN	7,279	36–22	2–0
May 26	vs. (1) #2 Florida	(5) #21	Hoover Metropolitan Stadium • Hoover, AL	L 3–12	Jackson Kowar (11–0)	Riley Self (5–1)	none	SECN	6,988	36–23	2–1
May 26	vs. (4) #13 Arkansas	(5) #21	Hoover Metropolitan Stadium • Hoover, AL	L 2–9	Blaine Knight (8–4)	Jacob Billingsley (1–3)	none	SECN	8,552	36–24	2–2

NCAA Hattiesburg Regional (4–1)
Date	Opponent	Rank	Site/stadium	Score	Win	Loss	Save	TV	Attendance	Overall record	NCAAT record
June 2	vs. (3) #19 South Alabama	(2) #22	Pete Taylor Park • Hattiesburg, MS	L 3–6	Randy Bell (7–3)	Cole Gordon (2–3)	none	ESPN3	4,248	36–25	0–1
June 3	vs (4) UIC	(2) #22	Pete Taylor Park • Hattiesburg, MS	Postponed to 6/4, inclement weather							
June 4	vs (4) UIC	(2) #22	Pete Taylor Park • Hattiesburg, MS	W 5–4	Konnor Pilkington (8–5)	Reid Birlingmair (7–5)	Riley Self (7)	ESPN3	4,149	37–25	1–1
June 4	vs (3) #19 South Alabama	(2) #22	Pete Taylor Park • Hattiesburg, MS	W 7–3	Denver McQuary (3–3)	Andy Arguelles (3–3)	Peyton Plumlee (1)	ESPN3	4,181	38–25	2–1
June 5	at (1) #14 Southern Miss	(2) #22	Pete Taylor Park • Hattiesburg, MS	W 8–1	Jacob Billingsley (2–3)	Colt Smith (6–2)	none	ESPN3	4,261	39–25	3–1
June 5	at (1) #14 Southern Miss	(2) #22	Pete Taylor Park • Hattiesburg, MS	W 8–6	Spencer Price (4–1)	Nick Sandlin (10–2)	Riley Self (8)	ESPN3	4,235	40–25	4–1

NCAA Baton Rouge Super Regional (0–2)
Date	Opponent	Rank	Site/stadium	Score	Win	Loss	Save	TV	Attendance	Overall record	NCAAT record
June 10	at (4) #2 LSU	#11	Alex Box Stadium • Baton Rouge, LA	L 3–4	Zack Hess (7–1)	Riley Self (5–2)	none	ESPN2	11,836	40–26	4–2
June 11	at (4) #2 LSU	#11	Alex Box Stadium • Baton Rouge, LA	L 4–14	Caleb Gilbert (6–1)	Denver McQuary (3–4)	none	ESPN2	11,706	40–27	4–3

† Indicates the game does not count toward the 2017 Southeastern Conference standings.
*Rankings are based on the team's current ranking in the Collegiate Baseball poll.

== Record vs. conference opponents ==
Last two do not qualify for conf. tourn. Blank are not scheduled. Blue are home games, otherwise away.

2017 SEC baseball records Source: 2017 SEC baseball game results
Team	W–L	ALA	ARK	AUB	FLA	UGA	KEN	LSU	MSU	MIZZ	MISS	SCAR	TENN	TAMU	VAN	Team	Div	SR	SW
ALA	5–24		1–2	3–0	0–3	.	.	0–3	0–3	0–3	0–3	1–2	.	0–3	0–2	ALA	W7	1–9	1–6
ARK	18–11	2–1		1–2	.	3–0	.	1–2	3–0	2–1	1–2	.	1–1	2–1	2–1	ARK	W2	6–3	2–0
AUB	16–14	0–3	2–1		3–0	2–1	.	0–3	2–1	.	2–1	2–1	2–1	1–2	.	AUB	W5	7–3	1–2
FLA	21–9	3–0	.	0–3		3–0	2–1	2–1	.	3–0	3–0	2–1	1–2	.	2–1	FLA	E1	8–2	4–1
UGA	11–19	.	0–3	1–2	0–3		2–1	0–3	2–1	1–2	.	2–1	2–1	.	1–2	UGA	E6	4–6	0–3
KEN	19–11	.	.	.	1–2	1–2		2–1	1–2	2–1	2–1	2–1	3–0	3–0	2–1	KEN	E2	7–3	2–0
LSU	21–9	3–0	2–1	3–0	1–2	3–0	1–2		3–0	.	2–1	2–1	.	1–2	.	LSU	W1	7–3	4–0
MSU	17–13	3–0	0–3	1–2	.	1–2	2–1	0–3		.	3–0	2–1	3–0	2–1	.	MSU	W3	6–4	3–2
MIZZ	14–16	3–0	1–2	.	0–3	2–1	1–2	.	.		1–2	2–1	3–0	0–3	1–2	MIZZ	E4	4–6	2–2
MISS	14–16	3–0	2–1	1–2	0–3	.	1–2	1–2	0–3	2–1		.	.	2–1	2–1	MISS	W6	5–5	1–2
SCAR	13–17	2–1	.	1–2	1–2	1–2	1–2	1–2	1–2	1–2	.		3–0	.	1–2	SCAR	E5	2–8	1–0
TENN	7–21	.	1–1	1–2	2–1	1–2	0–3	.	0–3	0–3	.	0–3		1–2	1–1	TENN	E7	1–7	0–4
TAMU	16–14	3–0	1–2	2–1	.	.	0–3	2–1	1–2	3–0	1–2	.	2–1		1–2	TAMU	W4	5–5	2–1
VAN	15–13	2–0	1–2	.	1–2	2–1	1–2	.	.	2–1	1–2	2–1	1–1	2–1		VAN	E3	5–4	0–0
Team	W–L	ALA	ARK	AUB	FLA	UGA	KEN	LSU	MSU	MIZZ	MISS	SCAR	TENN	TAMU	VAN	Team	Div	SR	SW

Updated for entire regular season. Alabama and Vanderbilt had one tie game.

== Rankings ==
Ranking movements Legend: ██ Increase in ranking ██ Decrease in ranking — = Not ranked RV = Received votes
	Week																		
Poll	Pre	1	2	3	4	5	6	7	8	9	10	11	12	13	14	15	16	17	Final
Coaches'	—	—*	—*	—	—	—	RV	25	21	16	13	13	9	13	19	18	18*	18*	12
Baseball America	—	—	—	—	—	—	—	22	13	11	8	9	6	11	18	20	20*	20*	14
Collegiate Baseball^	—	—	—	—	—	—	—	19	15	14	7	7	6	9	21	22	11	13	13
NCBWA†	32	27	25	RV	—	—	—	30	21	16	13	13	9	13	20	20	12	12*	13

^ Collegiate Baseball ranked 40 teams in their preseason poll, but only ranked 30 teams weekly during the season.
† NCBWA ranks 30 teams in their preseason poll, but only ranks 25 teams weekly during the season.
* A new poll was not released for this week, so for comparison purposes, the previous week's ranking is inserted in this week's slot.

== MLB draft ==
Player	Position	Round	Overall	MLB team
Brent Rooker†	1B/OF	1	35	Minnesota Twins
Ryan Gridley	SS	11	321	Oakland Athletics
Jake Mangum‡	OF	30	902	New York Yankees

†Rooker had been drafted in the 38th round in 2016 but returned to Mississippi State rather than signing with the Twins.
‡Mangum did not sign.
