= Jaxon (name) =

Jaxon or Jaxxon is a given name and surname. Notable people with the name include:

== Given name ==
- Jaxon Benge, American guitarist
- Jaxon Buell (2014–2020), American medical figure
- Jaxon Cover (born 2008), Canadian ice hockey player
- Jaxon Crabb (born 1979), Australian rules footballer
- Jaxon Deur, American politician
- Jaxon Evans (born 1996), New Zealand racing driver
- Jaxon Lee (born 1968), American voice actor
- Jaxon Nelson (born 2000), American ice hockey player
- Jaxon Prior (born 2001), Australian rules footballer
- Jaxon Smith-Njigba (born 2002), American football player
- Jaxon Shipley (born 1992), American football player
- Jaxon Wiggins (born 2001), American baseball player

== Surname ==
- Frankie Jaxon (c. 1896–1953), African-American vaudeville singer
- Honoré Jaxon or Honoré Jackson (1861–1952), Canadian secretary to Louis Riel during the North-West Rebellion
- Jay Jaxon (1941–2006), African-American fashion designer

== Fictional characters ==
- Eo Jaxxon, a character from the television series Moonbeam City
- Jaxxon, a Star Wars character originating in Star Wars (1977 comic book)
- Jaxxon Pierce, a character from the film Divinity
- Jerry Jaxon, Marvel Comics
- Thunderbolt Jaxon, superhero comic-book character
- Tigrr Jaxxon, a character from the television series Bolts & Blip
- Jaxon Cross, the main character of the manga and the anime series, Beyblade X

== See also ==
- Jason (name)
- Jaxson, given name
- Jackson (given name)
