= 2017 LSU Tigers baseball team =

NCAA Division 1 college baseball season

2017 LSU Tigers baseball

SEC regular season co-champions 2017 SEC Tournament champions

Baton Rouge Regional Baton Rouge Super Regional College World Series Runner-up
- Conference: Southeastern Conference

Ranking
- Coaches: No. 2
- CB: No. 2
- Record: 52–20 (21–9 SEC)
- Head coach: Paul Mainieri (11th season)
- Hitting coach: Micah Gibbs (1st season)
- Pitching coach: Alan Dunn (6th season)
- Home stadium: Alex Box Stadium, Skip Bertman Field

2017 Southeastern Conference baseball standings
	Conf.						Overall
Team	W		L		T	PCT	W		L		T	PCT
Eastern
No. 1 Florida ^{x}‍†‍‍^{y}	21	–	9	–	0	.700	52	–	19	–	0	.732
No. 10 Kentucky ‍‍‍^{y}	19	–	11	–	0	.633	43	–	23	–	0	.652
No. 15 Vanderbilt ‍‍‍^{y}	15	–	13	–	1	.534	36	–	25	–	1	.589
Missouri ‍‍‍	14	–	16	–	0	.467	36	–	23	–	0	.610
South Carolina ‍‍‍	13	–	17	–	0	.433	35	–	25	–	0	.583
Georgia ‍‍‍	11	–	19	–	0	.367	25	–	32	–	0	.439
Tennessee ‍‍‍	7	–	21	–	0	.250	27	–	25	–	0	.519
Western
No. 2 LSU ^{x}‍†‍‡‍^{y}	21	–	9	–	0	.700	52	–	20	–	0	.722
No. 22 Arkansas ‍‍‍^{y}	18	–	11	–	0	.621	45	–	19	–	0	.703
No. 13 Mississippi State ‍‍‍^{y}	17	–	13	–	0	.567	40	–	27	–	0	.597
No. 8 Texas A&M ‍‍‍^{y}	16	–	14	–	0	.533	41	–	23	–	0	.641
No. 29 Auburn ‍‍‍^{y}	16	–	14	–	0	.533	37	–	26	–	0	.587
Ole Miss ‍‍‍	14	–	16	–	0	.467	32	–	25	–	0	.561
Alabama ‍‍‍	5	–	24	–	1	.183	19	–	34	–	1	.361
x – Division champion † – Conference champion ‡ – Tournament champion y – Invited to the NCAA tournament Rankings from Collegiate Baseball

The 2017 LSU Tigers baseball team represented Louisiana State University (LSU) during the 2017 NCAA Division I baseball season. The Tigers played their home games at Alex Box Stadium as a member of the Southeastern Conference. They were led by head coach Paul Mainieri, in his 11th season at LSU. The Tigers hosted both the Baton Rouge Regional and Super Regional, before advancing to the 2017 College World Series. The Tigers were swept by Florida in the CWS Finals.

== Previous season ==
In 2016, the Tigers finished the season 3rd in the SEC's Western Division with a record of 45–21–0, 19–11–0 in conference play. They qualified for the 2016 Southeastern Conference baseball tournament and fell to Florida in the semifinal, 1–0. They qualified for the 2016 NCAA Division I baseball tournament as an At–large bid, and were selected as the #8 overall national seed. The Tigers were selected as hosts of the Baton Rouge regional, which included Rice, Southeastern Louisiana, and Utah Valley. The Tigers won their first two games of the regional, defeating Utah Valley, 7–1, and Rice, 4–2. In the regional final, LSU was again matched up with Rice. In the first game of the regional final, the Owls defeated the Tigers, 10–6. The Tigers went on to win game two, 5–2, eliminating Rice and advancing to the Baton Rouge Super Regional, where they faced the Coastal Carolina. In game one of the Super Regionals, the Tigers fell 11–8. In Game 2, Coastal Carolina hit a walk-off hit to upset the Fighting Tigers 4–3, moving onto the 2016 College World Series, where the Chanticleers would go on to win the National Championship.

== Personnel ==
=== Roster ===
2017 LSU Tigers roster
Pitchers: 10 – Eric Walker – Freshman; 16 – Jared Poché – Senior; 18 – Austin Bain – Junior; 21 – Doug Norman – Junior; 27 – Matthew Beck – Freshman; 29 – Nick Bush – Freshman; 30 – Collin Strall – Senior; 32 – Alden Cartwright – Senior; 33 – Cole McKay – Sophomore; 35 – Alex Lange – Junior; 37 – Will Reese – Freshman; 38 – Zach Hess – Freshman; 40 – Hunter Kiel – Junior; 41 – Caleb Gilbert – Sophomore; 43 – Todd Peterson – Freshman; 45 – Russell Reynolds – Senior; 46 – Blair Fredrick – Freshman; 55 – Hunter Newman – Senior	Catchers: 2 – Michael Papierski – Junior; 22 – Rankin Woley – Freshman; 28 – Jordan Romero – Senior; Infielders: 3 – Kramer Robertson – Senior; 4 – Josh Smith – Freshman; 5 – Jake Slaughter – Freshman; 7 – Greg Deichmann – Junior; 8 – Cole Freeman – Senior; 13 – Nick Coomes – Junior; 17 – Chris Reid – Sophomore; 23 – Mason Templet – Freshman; 25 – Bryce Jordan – Junior; 44 – Bryce Adams – Senior	Outfielders: 6 – Brennan Breaux – Sophomore; 9 – Zach Watson – Freshman; 20 – Antoine Duplantis – Sophomore; 24 – Beau Jordan – Junior

=== Coaching staff ===
Name	Position	Seasons at LSU	Alma mater
Paul Mainieri	Head coach	11	Florida International University (1980)
Micah Gibbs	Assistant Coach	1	Louisiana State University (2010)
Alan Dunn	Assistant Coach	6	University of Alabama at Birmingham (1991)

== Schedule ==
Legend
	LSU win
	LSU loss
	Postponement
**Bold**	LSU team member

2017 LSU Tigers Game Log
Regular season

February
Date	Opponent	Rank	Site/stadium	Score	Win	Loss	Save	Attendance	Overall record	SEC record
February 17	Air Force	#4	Alex Box Stadium • Baton Rouge, LA	9–0	Lange	Ball		10,834	1–0	–
February 18	Army	#4	Alex Box Stadium • Baton Rouge, LA	6–0	Poche'	Giovinco		11,174	2–0	–
February 19	Air Force	#4	Alex Box Stadium • Baton Rouge, LA	10–3	Walker	DeVreis		11,129	3–0	–
February 21	New Orleans	#4	Maestri Field • New Orleans, LA	8–11	Griffin	Strall		2,421	3–1	–
February 22	Hofstra	#4	Alex Box Stadium • Baton Rouge, LA	8–1	Hess	M. James		10,002	4–1	–
February 24	Maryland	#4	Alex Box Stadium • Baton Rouge, LA	6–1	Lange	B. Shaffer		10,488	5–1	–
February 25	Maryland	#4	Alex Box Stadium • Baton Rouge, LA	14–0	Poche'	T. Bloom		10,608	6–1	–
February 26	Maryland	#4	Alex Box Stadium • Baton Rouge, LA	9–5	Gilbert	T. Blohm	Newman	10,221	7–1	–
February 28	Nicholls State	#4	Alex Box Stadium • Baton Rouge, LA	3–2	Peterson	K. Craft	Newman	11,404	8–1	–

March
Date	Opponent	Rank	Site/stadium	Score	Win	Loss	Save	Attendance	Overall record	SEC record
March 3	#1 TCU	#4	Minute Maid Park • Houston, TX	6–9	Howard	Lange	King		8–2	–
March 4	vs. Baylor	#4	Minute Maid Park • Houston, TX	4–0	Poche'	Parsons			9–2	–
March 5	#21 Texas Tech	#4	Minute Maid Park • Houston, TX	4–5	McMillon	Newman			9–3	–
March 8	McNeese St.	#6	Joe Miller Ballpark • Lake Charles, LA	4–5	Fontenot	Peterson			9–4	–
March 10	Wichita State	#6	Alex Box Stadium • Baton Rouge, LA	6–1	Lange	Schwanke			10–4	–
March 11	Wichita St.	#6	Alex Box Stadium • Baton Rouge, LA	12–5	Poche'	Tyler			11–4	–
March 12	Wichita St.	#6	Alex Box Stadium • Baton Rouge, LA	9–2	Walker	Lewis			12–4	–
March 14	Louisiana College	#6	Alex Box Stadium • Baton Rouge, LA	13–0	Hess	Buchanan		10,166	13–4	–
March 15	New Orleans	#6	Alex Box Stadium • Baton Rouge, LA	4–7	Stephens	Strall		10,009	13–5	–
March 17	Georgia	#6	Alex Box Stadium • Baton Rouge, LA	22–9	Bain	Gist		10,722	14–5	1–0
March 18	Georgia	#6	Alex Box Stadium • Baton Rouge, LA	5–1	Poche'	Locey	Gilbert	11,327	15–5	2–0
March 19	Georgia	#6	Alex Box Stadium • Baton Rouge, LA	7–6	Walker	Adkins	Gilbert	10,608	16–5	3–0
March 22	Southeastern Louisiana	#4	Alex Box Stadium • Baton Rouge, LA	8–2	Hess	Koestler		11,211	17–5	3–0
March 24	#12 Florida	#4	McKethan Stadium • Gainesville, FL	0–1	Faedo	Lange	Dyson	4,485	17–6	3–1
March 25	#12 Florida	#4	McKethan Stadium • Gainesville, FL	1–8	Singer	Poche'		4,751	17–7	3–2
March 26	#12 Florida	#4	McKethan Stadium • Gainesville, FL	10–6	Bush	Baker	Gilbert	3,811	18–7	4–2
March 28	Tulane	#6	Alex Box Stadium • Baton Rouge, LA	6–7	Bjorngjeld	Reynolds	Colletti	10,732	18–8	4–2
March 30	Texas A&M	#6	Alex Box Stadium • Baton Rouge, LA	0–4	Hill	Lange		10,072	18–9	4–3
March 31	Texas A&M	#6	Alex Box Stadium • Baton Rouge, LA	7–4	Poche'	Kolek		11,308	19–9	5–3

April
Date	Opponent	Rank	Site/stadium	Score	Win	Loss	Save	Attendance	Overall record	SEC record
April 1	Texas A&M	#6	Alex Box Stadium • Baton Rouge, LA	3–4	Martin	Gilbert	Kilkenny	11,109	19–10	5–4
April 4	Grambling State	#13	Alex Box Stadium • Baton Rouge, LA	13–2	Reynolds	Beizer		9,883	20–10	5–4
April 7	#14 Arkansas	#13	Baum Stadium • Fayetteville, AR	3–9	Knight	Lange		10,741	20–11	5–5
April 8	#14 Arkansas	#13	Baum Stadium • Fayetteville, AR	10–8	Beck	Chadwick	Newman	11,827	21–11	6–5
April 9	#14 Arkansas	#13	Baum Stadium • Fayetteville, AR	2–0	Walker	Alberius		9,016	22–11	7–5
April 11	UL-Lafayette	#8	Shrine on Airline • Metairie, LA	3–2	Peterson	Burk	Newman	9,963	23–11	7–5
April 13	Ole Miss	#8	Alex Box Stadium • Baton Rouge, LA	15–2	Lange	McArthur		10,439	24–11	8–5
April 14	Ole Miss	#8	Alex Box Stadium • Baton Rouge, LA	1–4	Parkinson	Poche'	Woolfolk	11,203	24–12	8–6
April 15	Ole Miss	#8	Alex Box Stadium • Baton Rouge, LA	3–2	Walker	Rolison	Newman	10,757	25–12	9–6
April 18	Lamar	#8	Alex Box Stadium • Baton Rouge, LA	10–4	Gilbert	Johnson		10,603	26–12	9–6
April 21	#10 Kentucky	#8	Cliff Hagan Stadium • Lexington, KY	5–12	Hjelle	Poche'			26–13	9–7
April 21	#10 Kentucky	#8	Cliff Hagan Stadium • Lexington, KY	4–3	Hess	Salow		3,847	27–13	10–7
April 23	#10 Kentucky	#8	Cliff Hagan Stadium • Lexington, KY	2–10	Lewis	Walker		3,311	27–14	10–8
April 25	Tulane	#11	Turchin Stadium • New Orleans, LA	6–9	Solesky	Hess	Colletti	5,000	27–15	10–8
April 27	Alabama	#15	Sewell-Thomas Stadium • Tuscaloosa, AL	8–2	Lange	Duarte		3,666	28–15	11–8
April 28	Alabama	#15	Sewell-Thomas Stadium • Tuscaloosa, AL	7–4	Poche'	Eicholtz	Newman	4,464	29–15	12–8
April 29	Alabama	#15	Sewell-Thomas Stadium • Tuscaloosa, AL	4–3^{11}	Newman	Vainer		4,918	30–15	13–8

May
Date	Opponent	Rank	Site/stadium	Score	Win	Loss	Save	Attendance	Overall record	SEC record
May 5	#25 South Carolina	#11	Alex Box Stadium • Baton Rouge, LA	2–3	Reagan	Lange	Johnson	10,542	30–16	13–9
May 6	#25 South Carolina	#11	Alex Box Stadium • Baton Rouge, LA	5–2	Poche'	Hill	Newman	10,968	31–16	14–9
May 7	#25 South Carolina	#11	Alex Box Stadium • Baton Rouge, LA	7–6^{10}	Hess	Johnson		10,581	32–16	15–9
May 9	South Alabama	#10	Alex Box Stadium • Baton Rouge, LA	6–7	Arguelles	Bush	Peacock	10,312	32–17	15–9
May 11	#13 Auburn	#10	Alex Box Stadium • Baton Rouge, LA	4–0	Lange	Mitchell		10,261	33–17	16–9
May 12	#13 Auburn	#10	Alex Box Stadium • Baton Rouge, LA	5–3	Hess	Thompson	Newman	10,431	34–17	17–9
May 13	#13 Auburn	#10	Alex Box Stadium • Baton Rouge, LA	9–1	Walker	Mize		10,736	35–17	18–9
May 16	Northwestern State	#5	Alex Box Stadium • Baton Rouge, LA	9–3	Peterson	Swanson		10,931	36–17	18–9
May 18	#8 Mississippi State	#5	Dudy Noble Field • Starkville, MS	3–1	Lange	Pilkington	Newman	7,613	37–17	19–9
May 19	#8 Mississippi State	#5	Dudy Noble Field • Starkville, MS	11–5	Poche'	McQuary	Hess	9,434	38–17	20–9
May 20	#8 Mississippi State	#5	Dudy Noble Field • Starkville, MS	11–7	Gilbert	Gordon		9,007	39–17	21–9

Post-season

SEC Tournament
Date	Opponent	Rank	Site/stadium	Score	Win	Loss	Save	Attendance	Overall record	SEC record
May 24	Missouri		Hoover Metropolitan Stadium • Hoover, AL	10–3	Gilbert	Sikkema			40–17	21–9
May 25	#10 Kentucky		Hoover Metropolitan Stadium • Hoover, AL	10–0	Lange	Hjelle		9,823	41–17	21–9
May 27	South Carolina		Hoover Metropolitan Stadium • Hoover, AL	11–0	Poche'	Lee			42–17	21–9
May 28	#13 Arkansas		Hoover Metropolitan Stadium • Hoover, AL	4–2	Walker	Kopps	Newman	13,128	43–17	21–9

NCAA tournament – Baton Rouge Regional
Date	Opponent	Rank	Site/stadium	Score	Win	Loss	Save	Attendance	Overall record	SEC record
June 2	Texas Southern	#2	Alex Box Stadium • Baton Rouge, LA	15–7	Gilbert	Martinez			44–17	21–9
June 3	Southeastern Louisiana	#2	Alex Box Stadium • Baton Rouge, LA	11–6	Lange	Sceroler		11,661	45–17	21–9
June 4	Rice	#2	Alex Box Stadium • Baton Rouge, LA	5–0	Walker	Moss		10,639	46–17	21–9

NCAA tournament – Baton Rouge Super Regional
Date	Opponent	Rank	Site/stadium	Score	Win	Loss	Save	Attendance	Overall record	SEC record
June 10	#11 Mississippi State	#2	Alex Box Stadium • Baton Rouge, LA	4–3	Hess	Riley Self		11,836	47–17	21–9
June 11	#11 Mississippi State	#2	Alex Box Stadium • Baton Rouge, LA	14–4	Gilbert	McQuary		11,706	48–17	21–9

NCAA tournament – College World Series
Date	Opponent	Rank	Site/stadium	Score	Win	Loss	Save	Attendance	Overall record	SEC record
June 17	#6 Florida State	#2	TD Ameritrade Park • Omaha, NE	5–4	Poche'	Holton	Hess	25,305	49–17	21–9
June 19	#1 Oregon State	#2	TD Ameritrade Park • Omaha, NE	1–13	Fehmel	Walker		24,874	49–18	21–9
June 21	#6 Florida State	#2	TD Ameritrade Park • Omaha, NE	7–4	Poche'	Sands	Hess	22,133	50–18	21–9
June 23	#1 Oregon State	#2	TD Ameritrade Park • Omaha, NE	3–1	Lange	Thompson	Hess	21,257	51–18	21–9
June 24	#1 Oregon State	#2	TD Ameritrade Park • Omaha, NE	6–1	Gilbert	Fehmel		15,618	52–18	21–9
June 26	#3 Florida	#2	TD Ameritrade Park • Omaha, NE	3–4	Singer	Reynolds	Byrne	25,679	52–19	21–9
June 27	#3 Florida	#2	TD Ameritrade Park • Omaha, NE	1–6	Dyson	Poche'	Kowar	26,607	52–20	21–9

All rankings from Collegiate Baseball.

== Record vs. conference opponents ==
Last two do not qualify for conf. tourn. Blank are not scheduled. Blue are home games, otherwise away.

2017 SEC baseball records Source: 2017 SEC baseball game results
Team	W–L	ALA	ARK	AUB	FLA	UGA	KEN	LSU	MSU	MIZZ	MISS	SCAR	TENN	TAMU	VAN	Team	Div	SR	SW
ALA	5–24		1–2	3–0	0–3	.	.	0–3	0–3	0–3	0–3	1–2	.	0–3	0–2	ALA	W7	1–9	1–6
ARK	18–11	2–1		1–2	.	3–0	.	1–2	3–0	2–1	1–2	.	1–1	2–1	2–1	ARK	W2	6–3	2–0
AUB	16–14	0–3	2–1		3–0	2–1	.	0–3	2–1	.	2–1	2–1	2–1	1–2	.	AUB	W5	7–3	1–2
FLA	21–9	3–0	.	0–3		3–0	2–1	2–1	.	3–0	3–0	2–1	1–2	.	2–1	FLA	E1	8–2	4–1
UGA	11–19	.	0–3	1–2	0–3		2–1	0–3	2–1	1–2	.	2–1	2–1	.	1–2	UGA	E6	4–6	0–3
KEN	19–11	.	.	.	1–2	1–2		2–1	1–2	2–1	2–1	2–1	3–0	3–0	2–1	KEN	E2	7–3	2–0
LSU	21–9	3–0	2–1	3–0	1–2	3–0	1–2		3–0	.	2–1	2–1	.	1–2	.	LSU	W1	7–3	4–0
MSU	17–13	3–0	0–3	1–2	.	1–2	2–1	0–3		.	3–0	2–1	3–0	2–1	.	MSU	W3	6–4	3–2
MIZZ	14–16	3–0	1–2	.	0–3	2–1	1–2	.	.		1–2	2–1	3–0	0–3	1–2	MIZZ	E4	4–6	2–2
MISS	14–16	3–0	2–1	1–2	0–3	.	1–2	1–2	0–3	2–1		.	.	2–1	2–1	MISS	W6	5–5	1–2
SCAR	13–17	2–1	.	1–2	1–2	1–2	1–2	1–2	1–2	1–2	.		3–0	.	1–2	SCAR	E5	2–8	1–0
TENN	7–21	.	1–1	1–2	2–1	1–2	0–3	.	0–3	0–3	.	0–3		1–2	1–1	TENN	E7	1–7	0–4
TAMU	16–14	3–0	1–2	2–1	.	.	0–3	2–1	1–2	3–0	1–2	.	2–1		1–2	TAMU	W4	5–5	2–1
VAN	15–13	2–0	1–2	.	1–2	2–1	1–2	.	.	2–1	1–2	2–1	1–1	2–1		VAN	E3	5–4	0–0
Team	W–L	ALA	ARK	AUB	FLA	UGA	KEN	LSU	MSU	MIZZ	MISS	SCAR	TENN	TAMU	VAN	Team	Div	SR	SW

Updated for entire regular season. Alabama and Vanderbilt had one tie game.

== Rankings ==
Ranking movements
	Week																			
Poll	Pre	1	2	3	4	5	6	7	8	9	10	11	12	13	14	15	16	17	18	Final
Coaches'	3	3*																		
Baseball America	4																			
Collegiate Baseball^	2																			
NCBWA†	3																			

^ Collegiate Baseball ranked 40 teams in their preseason poll, but only ranked 30 teams weekly during the season.
† NCBWA ranks 30 teams in their preseason poll, but only ranks 25 teams weekly during the season.
* A new poll was not released for this week, so for comparison purposes, the previous week's ranking is inserted in this week's slot.

== Awards and honors ==
- OF Greg Deichmann: consensus All-America, first-team All-SEC
- SP Alex Lange: first-team All-SEC
- SS Kramer Robertson: second-team All-SEC
- 3B Josh Smith: freshman All-SEC, All-SEC defensive
- OF Zach Watson: freshman All-SEC
- SP Eric Walker: freshman All-SEC
- C Michael Papierski: All-SEC defensive
