= 2017 Kentucky Wildcats baseball team =

2017 season of University of Kentucky baseball team

2017 Kentucky Wildcats baseball
- Conference: Southeastern Conference

Ranking
- Coaches: No. 10
- CB: No. 9
- Record: 43–23 (19–11 SEC)
- Head coach: Nick Mingione (1st season)
- Assistant coaches: Jim Belanger (1st season); Roland Fanning (1st season); Todd Guilliams (1st season)
- Home stadium: Cliff Hagan Stadium

2017 Southeastern Conference baseball standings
	Conf.						Overall
Team	W		L		T	PCT	W		L		T	PCT
Eastern
No. 1 Florida ^{x}‍†‍‍^{y}	21	–	9	–	0	.700	52	–	19	–	0	.732
No. 10 Kentucky ‍‍‍^{y}	19	–	11	–	0	.633	43	–	23	–	0	.652
No. 15 Vanderbilt ‍‍‍^{y}	15	–	13	–	1	.534	36	–	25	–	1	.589
Missouri ‍‍‍	14	–	16	–	0	.467	36	–	23	–	0	.610
South Carolina ‍‍‍	13	–	17	–	0	.433	35	–	25	–	0	.583
Georgia ‍‍‍	11	–	19	–	0	.367	25	–	32	–	0	.439
Tennessee ‍‍‍	7	–	21	–	0	.250	27	–	25	–	0	.519
Western
No. 2 LSU ^{x}‍†‍‡‍^{y}	21	–	9	–	0	.700	52	–	20	–	0	.722
No. 22 Arkansas ‍‍‍^{y}	18	–	11	–	0	.621	45	–	19	–	0	.703
No. 13 Mississippi State ‍‍‍^{y}	17	–	13	–	0	.567	40	–	27	–	0	.597
No. 8 Texas A&M ‍‍‍^{y}	16	–	14	–	0	.533	41	–	23	–	0	.641
No. 29 Auburn ‍‍‍^{y}	16	–	14	–	0	.533	37	–	26	–	0	.587
Ole Miss ‍‍‍	14	–	16	–	0	.467	32	–	25	–	0	.561
Alabama ‍‍‍	5	–	24	–	1	.183	19	–	34	–	1	.361
x – Division champion † – Conference champion ‡ – Tournament champion y – Invited to the NCAA tournament Rankings from Collegiate Baseball

The 2017 Kentucky Wildcats baseball team represented the University of Kentucky during the 2017 NCAA Division I baseball season. The Wildcats played their home games at Cliff Hagan Stadium as a member of the Southeastern Conference. They were led by head coach Nick Mingione, who was in his first year at Kentucky. Following the conclusion of the regular season, the Wildcats were selected to host their second NCAA Regional, the first since 2006. The Wildcats won their regional, and faced Louisville in the super regionals, losing 2 games to none.

== Roster ==
2017 Kentucky Wildcats roster
Pitchers: 9 – Josh Smith – Sophomore; 12 – Alec Maley – Junior; 14 – Zack Thompson – Freshman; 21 – Justin Lewis – (redshirt) Sophomore; 22 – Austin Keen – (redshirt) Freshman; 24 – Brett Marshall – Freshman; 25 – Gunnar McNeill – Senior; 28 – Logan Salow – Senior; 30 – Sean Hjelle – Sophomore; 33 – Chris Machamer – Freshman; 34 – Carson Coleman – Freshman; 39 – Zach Logue – Junior; 42 – Brad Schaenzer – Junior; 44 – Colton Cleary – Senior; 52 – Zach Pop – Junior	Catchers: 5 – T.J. Collett – Freshman; 13 – Kole Cottam – Sophomore; 16 – Troy Squires – (redshirt) Junior; 50 – Marshall Gei – (redshirt) Sophomore; Infielders: 2 – Riley Mahan – Junior; 3 – Tyler Marshall – (redshirt) Junior; 4 – Zeke Lewis – (redshirt) Freshman; 7 – Connor Heady – Senior; 10 – Luke Becker – Junior; 20 – Joey Bellini – Freshman; 23 – Brayden Combs – Freshman; 26 – Luke Heyer – Junior	Outfielders: 6 – Tristan Pompey – Sophomore; 8 – Storm Wilson – (redshirt) Senior; 15 – Marcus Carson – Freshman; 19 – Evan White – Junior; 40 – Zach Reks – Senior

== Schedule ==
Legend
	Kentucky win
	Kentucky loss
	Postponement
**Bold**	Kentucky team member

2017 Kentucky Wildcats baseball game log
Regular season
February

Date	Opponent	Rank	Site/stadium	Score	Win	Loss	Save	Attendance	Overall record	SEC record
February 17	#12 North Carolina		Boshamer Stadium • Chapel Hill	**L** 1–3	Bukauskas (1–0)	**Hjalle (0–1)**	Hiatt (1)	1,763	0–1	
February 18	#12 North Carolina		Boshamer Stadium • Chapel Hill	**L** 5–6	Morgan (1–0)	**Logue (0–1)**	Hiatt (2)	2,551	0–2	
February 19	#12 North Carolina		Boshamer Stadium • Chapel Hill	**L** 4–5	Dalatri (1–0)	**Lewis (0–1)**	Hiatt (3)	2,632	0–3	
February 22	Liberty		Liberty Baseball Stadium • Lynchburg, VA	**L** 4–5	Tarantola (1–0)	**Thompson (0–1)**	Degroat (1)	1,335	0–4	
February 24	vs. Saint Joseph's		Bud Metheny Complex • Norfolk, VA	**W** 16–9	**Pop (1–0)**	Gorman (0–1)	None	1,000	1–4	
February 25	vs. Old Dominion		Bud Metheny Complex • Norfolk, VA	**W** 19–2	**Logue (1–1)**	Maguire (1–1)	None	1,004	2–4	
February 26	vs. Delaware		Bud Metheny Complex • Norfolk, VA	**L** 3–4	Meeker (1–1)	**Salow (0–1)**	Marinaccio (1)	1,056	2–5	
February 28	Eastern Kentucky		Cliff Hagan Stadium • Lexington, KY	**W** 12–0	**Schaenzer (1–0)**	Quillens (0–1)	None	1,846	3–5	

March

Date	Opponent	Rank	Site/stadium	Score	Win	Loss	Save	Attendance	Overall record	SEC record
March 1	Western Kentucky		Cliff Hagan Stadium • Lexington, KY	**W** 17–2	**Thompson (1–1)**	Acosta (0–1)	None	2,015	4–5	
March 3	#23 UCSB		Cliff Hagan Stadium • Lexington, KY	**W** 2–1	**Hjelle (1–1)**	Davis (2–1)	Cleary (1)	1,942	5–5	
March 4	#23 UCSB		Cliff Hagan Stadium • Lexington, KY	**W** 2–1	**Logue (2–1)**	Nelson (2–1)	Salow (1)	2,273	6–5	
March 5	#23 UCSB		Cliff Hagan Stadium • Lexington, KY	**W** 12–1	**Lewis (1–1)**	Ledesma (0–1)	None	2,439	7–5	
March 7	Wright State		Cliff Hagan Stadium • Lexington, KY	**W** 15–1	**Schaenzer (2–1)**	Swaney (1–1)	None	1,830	8–5	
March 8	Cincinnati		Marge Schott Stadium • Cincinnati, OH	**L** 1–2	Kullman (3–1)	**Salow (0–2)**	None	733	8–6	
March 9	Miami (OH)		Cliff Hagan Stadium • Lexington, KY	**W** 6–4	**Hjelle (2–1)**	Gnetz (0–3)	Cleary (2)	2,099	9–6	
March 10	Miami (OH)		Cliff Hagan Stadium • Lexington, KY	**W** 16–3	**Logue (3–1)**	Spears (1–3)	None	1,850	10–6	
March 12	Miami (OH)		Cliff Hagan Stadium • Lexington, KY	**W** 14–2	**Lewis (2–1)**	Schwartz (1–1)	None	1,829	11–6	
March 14	Murray State		Cliff Hagan Stadium • Lexington, KY	**W** 9–7	**Cleary (1–0)**	Lollar (0–1)	Salow (2)	1,758	12–6	
March 17	Texas A&M		Olsen Field at Blue Bell Park • College Station, TX	**W** 6–0	**Hjelle (3–1)**	Hill (4–1)	None	5,242	13–6	1–0
March 18	Texas A&M		Olsen Field at Blue Bell Park • College Station, TX	**W** 7–6	**Schaenzer (3–0)**	Cason (4–1)	Salow (3)	5,796	14–6	2–0
March 19	Texas A&M		Olsen Field at Blue Bell Park • College Station, TX	**W** 11–7	**Lewis (3–1)**	Kilkenny (2–1)	None	4,472	15–6	3–0
March 21	Western Kentucky		Bowling Green Ballpark • Bowling Green, Kentucky	**W** 4–3	**Thompson (2–1)**	Ciocco (0–3)	Salow (4)	2,825	16–6	
March 23	Ole Miss		Cliff Hagan Stadium • Lexington, KY	**L** 6–9	McArthur (1–1)	**Hjelle (3–2)**	Woolfolk (6)	2,738	16–7	3–1
March 24	Ole Miss		Cliff Hagan Stadium • Lexington, KY	**W** 4–2	**Logue (4–1)**	Holston (0–2)	Salow (5)	2,770	17–7	4–1
March 25	Ole Miss		Cliff Hagan Stadium • Lexington, KY	**W** 4–1	**Lewis (4–1)**	Ethridge (1–1)	Salow (6)	2,841	18–7	5–1
March 28	Cincinnati Bearcats		Cliff Hagan Stadium • Lexington, KY	**W** 13–7	**Schaenzer (4–0)**	Kullman 3–3	None	2,150	19–7	
March 31	Vanderbilt		Cliff Hagan Stadium • Lexington, KY	**W** 7–4	**Hjelle (4–2)**	Raby 4–3	None	3,071	20–7	6–1

April

Date	Opponent	Rank	Site/stadium	Score	Win	Loss	Save	Attendance	Overall record	SEC record
April 1	Vanderbilt		Cliff Hagan Stadium • Lexington, KY	**W** 10–3	**Logue (5–1)**	Wright (1–4)	None	2,465	21–7	7–1
April 2	Vanderbilt		Cliff Hagan Stadium • Lexington, KY	**L** 4–6	Conger (2–0)	**Pop (1–1)**	Ruppenthal (3)	3,512	21–8	7–2
April 4	Louisville		Jim Patterson Stadium • Louisville, KY	**L** 3–5	Hummel (3–0)	**Thompson (2–2)**	Henzman (8)	6,210	21–9	
April 7	Mississippi State		Dudy Noble Field • Starkville, MS	**W** 5–2	**Salow (1–2)**	Barlow (0–1)	None	9,256	22–9	8–2
April 8	Mississippi State		Dudy Noble Field • Starkville, MS	**L** 6–10	**Plumlee (4–1)**	Logue (5–2)	None	13,691	22–10	8–3
April 9	Mississippi State		Dudy Noble Field • Starkville, MS	**L** 6–10	**Jolly (1–1)**	Lewis (4–2)	Price (10)	8,082	22–11	8–4
April 12	UT Martin		Cliff Hagan Stadium • Lexington, KY	**W** 8–0	**Thompson (3–2)**	Peyton (0–3)	None	2,511	23–11	
April 14	Mizzou		Taylor Stadium • Columbia, MO	**W** 5–2	**Hjelle (5–2)**	Houck (3–5)	Salow (7)	2,402	24–11	9–4
April 15	Mizzou		Taylor Stadium • Columbia, MO	**L** 8–9	Sikkema (6–0)	**Logue (5–3)**	None	2,402	24–12	9–5
April 16	Mizzou		Taylor Stadium • Columbia, MO	**W** 6–1	**Lewis (5–2)**	Montes (3–2)	Salow (8)	2,402	25–12	10–5
April 18	Louisville		Cliff Hagan Stadium • Lexington, KY	**W** 11–7	**Thompson (4–2)**	Hummel (4–1)	None	4,018	26–12	
April 21	LSU		Cliff Hagan Stadium • Lexington, KY	**W** 12–5	**Hjelle (6–2)**	Poche' (6–3)	None		27–12	11–5
April 21	LSU		Cliff Hagan Stadium • Lexington, KY	**L** 3–4	Hess (4–0)	**Salow (1–3)**	None	3,847	27–13	11–6
April 23	LSU		Cliff Hagan Stadium • Lexington, KY	**W** 10–2	**Lewis (6–2)**	Walker (5–1)	None	3,311	28–13	12–6
April 26	Xavier		Cliff Hagan Stadium • Lexington, KY	**W** 6–0	**Thompson (5–2 )**	Williams (1–1)	None	2,950	29–13	
April 28	South Carolina		Founders Park • Columbia, SC	**W** 19–1	**Hjelle (7–2)**	Crowe (4–4)	None	7,753	30–13	13–6
April 29	South Carolina		Founders Park • Columbia, SC	**L** 1–5	Hill (3–3)	**Logue (5–4)**	Johnson (7)	8,025	30–14	13–7
April 30	South Carolina		Founders Park • Columbia, SC	**W** 9–4	**Salow (2–3)**	Johnson (0–1)	None	7,115	31–14	14–7

May

Date	Opponent	Rank	Site/stadium	Score	Win	Loss	Save	Attendance	Overall record	SEC record
May 5	Georgia		Cliff Hagan Stadium • Lexington, KY	**L** 3–5	Kristofak (3–1)	**Salow (2–4)**	Smith (2)	1,917	31–15	14–8
May 6	Georgia		Cliff Hagan Stadium • Lexington, KY	**W** 7–4	**Logue (6–4)**	Adkins (5–6)	Thompson (1)	2,483	32–15	15–8
May 7	Georgia		Cliff Hagan Stadium • Lexington, KY	**L** 3–6	Smith (3–5)	**Salow (2–5)**	None	2,897	32–16	15–9
May 9	Indiana		Cliff Hagan Stadium • Lexington, KY	**W** 5–2	**Thompson (6–2)**	Hobbie (2–5)	Salow (9)	2,442	33–16	
May 12	Tennessee		Cliff Hagan Stadium • Lexington, KY	**W** 15–5	**Hjelle (8–2)**	Martin (5–6)	None	2,368	34–16	16–9
May 13	Tennessee		Cliff Hagan Stadium • Lexington, KY	**W** 8–3	**Machamer (1–0)**	Stallings (3–3)	None	3,793	35–16	17–9
May 14	Tennessee		Cliff Hagan Stadium • Lexington, KY	**W** 7–2	**Thompson (7–2)**	Warren (2–5)	Salow (10)	3,085	36–16	18–9
May 16	Northern Kentucky		Cliff Hagan Stadium • Lexington, KY	**W** 10–1	**Schaenzer (5–0)**	Ganns (3–7)	None	2,484	37–16	
May 18	Florida		McKethan Stadium • Gainesville, FL	**W** 12–4	**Hjelle (9–2)**	Faedo (7–2)	None	3,693	38–16	19–9
May 19	Florida		McKethan Stadium • Gainesville, FL	**L** 3–14	Singer (7–3)	**Logue (6–5)**	None	4,153	38–17	19–10
May 20	Florida		McKethan Stadium • Gainesville, FL	**L** 4–6	Kowar (10–0)	**Logue (6–5)**	None	3,938	38–18	19–11

Postseason
SEC Tournament

Date	Opponent	Rank	Site/stadium	Score	Win	Loss	Save	Attendance	Overall record	SEC Tournament record
May 24	South Carolina		Hoover Metropolitan Stadium • Hoover, AL	**W** 7–2	**Logue (7–5)**	Morris (3–2)	Machamer (1)	5,062	39–18	1–0
May 25	LSU		Hoover Metropolitan Stadium • Hoover, AL	**L** 0–10	Lange (8–5)	**Hjelle (9–3)**	None	9,823	39–19	1–1
May 26	South Carolina		Hoover Metropolitan Stadium • Hoover, AL	**L** 1–3	Reagan (6–2)	**Salow (2–5)**	Johnson (10)	9,823	39–20	1–2

NCAA tournament Kentucky Regional

Date	Opponent	Rank	Site/stadium	Score	Win	Loss	Save	Attendance	Overall record	Regional record
June 2	Ohio		Cliff Hagan Stadium • Lexington, KY	**W** 6–4	**Hjelle (10–3)**	Klein (5–3)	Salow (11)	3,956	40–20	1–0
June 3	NC State		Cliff Hagan Stadium • Lexington, KY	**L** 4–5	Adler (6–6)	**Lewis (6–4)**	Staley (5)	4,742	40–21	1–1
June 4	Indiana		Cliff Hagan Stadium • Lexington, KY	**W** 14–9	**Thompson (8–2)**	Krueger (5–2)	None	2,480	41–21	2–1
June 4	NC State		Cliff Hagan Stadium • Lexington, KY	**W** 8–6	**Machamer (2–0)**	Brown (4–2)	None	3,261	42–21	3–1
June 5	NC State		Cliff Hagan Stadium • Lexington, KY	**W** 10–5	**Hjelle (11–3)**	Beckman (0–2)	None	5,005	43–21	4–1

NCAA tournament Louisville Super Regional

Date	Opponent	Rank	Site/stadium	Score	Win	Loss	Save	Attendance	Overall record	Super Regional record
June 9	Louisville		Jim Patterson Stadium • Louisville, KY	**L** 2–5	McClure (8–3)	**Thompson (8–3)**	None	6,235	43–22	0–1
June 10	Louisville		Jim Patterson Stadium • Louisville, KY	**L** 2–6	McKay (10–3)	**Hjelle (11–4)**	Bordner (3)	6,237	43–23	0–2

== Record vs. conference opponents ==
Last two do not qualify for conf. tourn. Blank are not scheduled. Blue are home games, otherwise away.

2017 SEC baseball records Source: 2017 SEC baseball game results
Team	W–L	ALA	ARK	AUB	FLA	UGA	KEN	LSU	MSU	MIZZ	MISS	SCAR	TENN	TAMU	VAN	Team	Div	SR	SW
ALA	5–24		1–2	3–0	0–3	.	.	0–3	0–3	0–3	0–3	1–2	.	0–3	0–2	ALA	W7	1–9	1–6
ARK	18–11	2–1		1–2	.	3–0	.	1–2	3–0	2–1	1–2	.	1–1	2–1	2–1	ARK	W2	6–3	2–0
AUB	16–14	0–3	2–1		3–0	2–1	.	0–3	2–1	.	2–1	2–1	2–1	1–2	.	AUB	W5	7–3	1–2
FLA	21–9	3–0	.	0–3		3–0	2–1	2–1	.	3–0	3–0	2–1	1–2	.	2–1	FLA	E1	8–2	4–1
UGA	11–19	.	0–3	1–2	0–3		2–1	0–3	2–1	1–2	.	2–1	2–1	.	1–2	UGA	E6	4–6	0–3
KEN	19–11	.	.	.	1–2	1–2		2–1	1–2	2–1	2–1	2–1	3–0	3–0	2–1	KEN	E2	7–3	2–0
LSU	21–9	3–0	2–1	3–0	1–2	3–0	1–2		3–0	.	2–1	2–1	.	1–2	.	LSU	W1	7–3	4–0
MSU	17–13	3–0	0–3	1–2	.	1–2	2–1	0–3		.	3–0	2–1	3–0	2–1	.	MSU	W3	6–4	3–2
MIZZ	14–16	3–0	1–2	.	0–3	2–1	1–2	.	.		1–2	2–1	3–0	0–3	1–2	MIZZ	E4	4–6	2–2
MISS	14–16	3–0	2–1	1–2	0–3	.	1–2	1–2	0–3	2–1		.	.	2–1	2–1	MISS	W6	5–5	1–2
SCAR	13–17	2–1	.	1–2	1–2	1–2	1–2	1–2	1–2	1–2	.		3–0	.	1–2	SCAR	E5	2–8	1–0
TENN	7–21	.	1–1	1–2	2–1	1–2	0–3	.	0–3	0–3	.	0–3		1–2	1–1	TENN	E7	1–7	0–4
TAMU	16–14	3–0	1–2	2–1	.	.	0–3	2–1	1–2	3–0	1–2	.	2–1		1–2	TAMU	W4	5–5	2–1
VAN	15–13	2–0	1–2	.	1–2	2–1	1–2	.	.	2–1	1–2	2–1	1–1	2–1		VAN	E3	5–4	0–0
Team	W–L	ALA	ARK	AUB	FLA	UGA	KEN	LSU	MSU	MIZZ	MISS	SCAR	TENN	TAMU	VAN	Team	Div	SR	SW

Updated for entire regular season. Alabama and Vanderbilt had one tie game.
