= Paul Richan =

American baseball player (born 1997)

- Pitcher
- Born: March 26, 1997 (age 29); Santa Clarita, California, U.S.
- Bats: Right Throws: Right
- Stats at Baseball Reference

Paul Douglas Richan (born March 26, 1997) is an American former professional baseball pitcher. He was drafted by the Chicago Cubs in the second round of the 2018 Major League Baseball draft.

== Amateur career ==
Richan attended Hart High School in Santa Clarita, California. In 2015, his senior year, he went 5–2 with a 1.65 ERA and 71 strikeouts. Undrafted in the 2015 Major League Baseball draft, he enrolled at the University of San Diego (USD) where he played college baseball.

In 2016, as a freshman at USD, Richan appeared in 13 games (making one start), pitching to a 1–1 record with an 8.88 ERA with twenty strikeouts over 24 innings. As a sophomore in 2017, he pitched in 18 games (11 starts), going 5–2 with a 3.05 ERA, earning All-West Coast Conference Honorable Mention. In 2018, his junior season, Richan transitioned into a full-time starter, pitching to a 4–6 record with a 4.62 ERA across 13 starts, striking out 101 in 89 2/3 innings.

== Professional career ==
=== Chicago Cubs ===
After his junior year at USD, Richan was selected by the Chicago Cubs in the second round (78th overall) of the 2018 Major League Baseball draft. Richan signed with the Cubs and made his professional debut with the Eugene Emeralds. Over ten games (nine starts), he went 0–2 with a 2.12 ERA, striking out 31 and walking only five across 29 2/3 innings. In 2019, he began the year with the Myrtle Beach Pelicans with whom he was named a Florida State League All-Star.

=== Detroit Tigers ===
On July 31, 2019, Richan was traded along with Alex Lange to the Detroit Tigers in exchange for Nicholas Castellanos. He was assigned to the High–A Lakeland Flying Tigers, and finished the season there. Over 22 starts between Myrtle Beach and Lakeland, Richan pitched to a 12–7 record and a 4.00 ERA, striking out 115 over 123 2/3 innings. He did not play a game in 2020 due to the cancellation of the minor league season because of the COVID-19 pandemic.

To begin the 2021 season, he was assigned to the Double–A Erie SeaWolves. In late June, he was placed on the injured list and missed the rest of the season. Over eight starts, he compiled a 3.72 ERA and 26 strikeouts over 29 innings.

Richan began the 2022 season on injured list with Erie, and made three rehab appearances for Single–A Lakeland. On May 20, 2022, the Tigers released Richan. On August 25, Richan announced his retirement from professional baseball via Instagram, following another surgery.
