= Andy Cannizaro =

American baseball player and coach (born 1978)

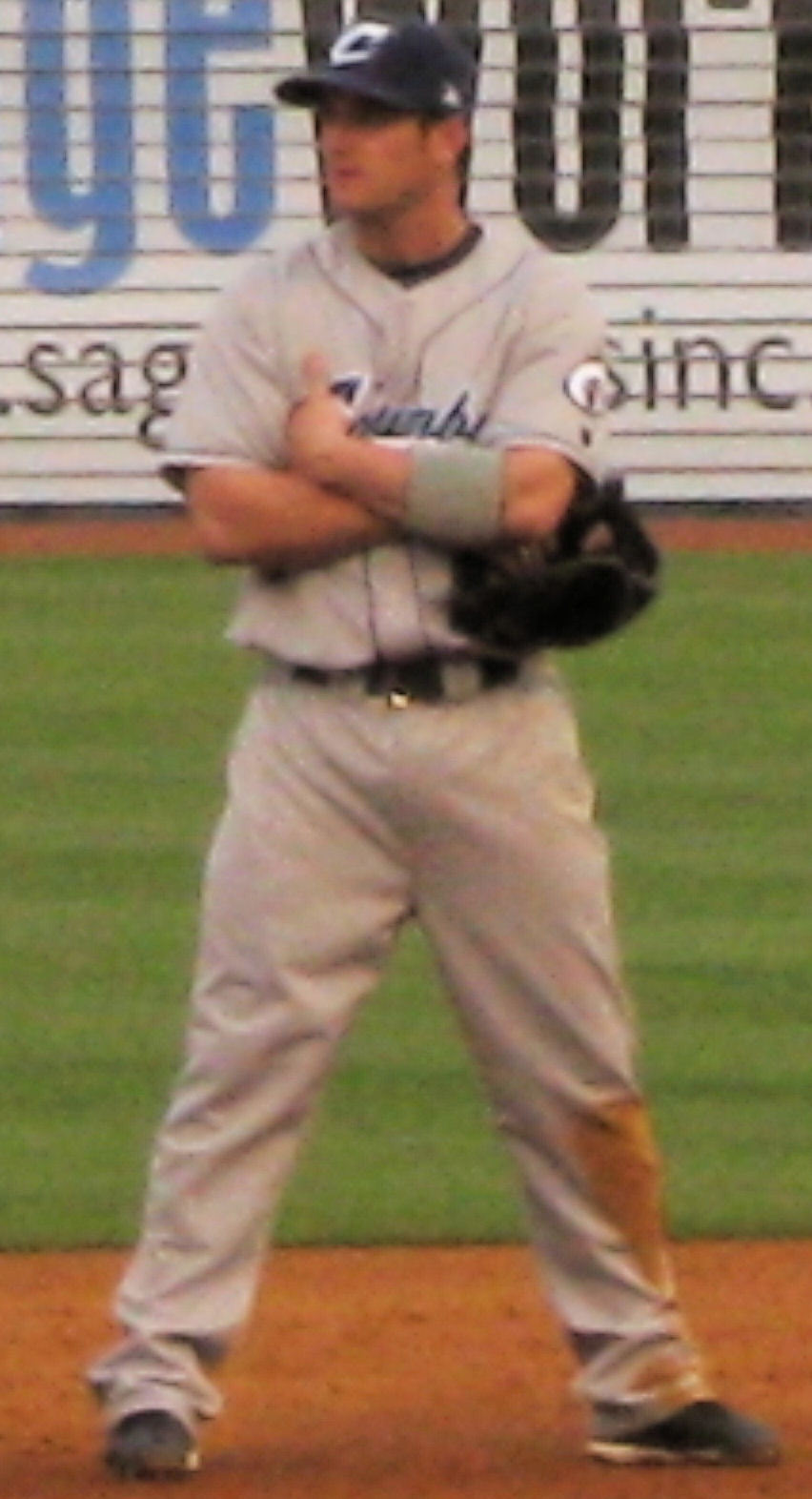
- Cannizaro with the Columbus Clippers in 2009
- Shortstop
- Born: December 19, 1978 (age 47); New Orleans, Louisiana, U.S.
- Batted: Right Threw: Right

MLB debut
- September 5, 2006, for the New York Yankees

Last MLB appearance
- May 3, 2008, for the Tampa Bay Rays

MLB statistics
- Batting average: .222
- Home runs: 1
- Runs batted in: 1
- Stats at Baseball Reference

Teams
- New York Yankees (2006); Tampa Bay Rays (2008)

Andy Cannizaro
Biographical details
- Born: Mandeville, Louisiana
- Education: St. Paul's (Covington, LA); Tulane University

Coaching career (HC unless noted)
- 2008: Louisiana Knights
- 2009–2014: New York Yankees (scout)
- 2014–2016: LSU (asst.)
- 2017–2018: Mississippi State
- 2019–2022: Holy Cross HS (LA)

Head coaching record
- Overall: 40–30 (.571)

Andrew Lee Cannizaro (born December 19, 1978) is an American former Major League Baseball infielder who played for the New York Yankees and Tampa Bay Rays between 2006 and 2008, and a former head baseball coach for the Mississippi State Bulldogs.

== Playing career ==
Cannizaro played college baseball for the Tulane Green Wave. While at Tulane, he was named to the All-Tournament Team at the 1999 Conference USA baseball tournament, which Tulane won. After the 1999 season, he played collegiate summer baseball with the Cotuit Kettleers of the Cape Cod Baseball League. He was a two time all-American at Tulane, and a four-year starter. After four seasons in college, he was drafted by the Yankees in the seventh round of the 2001 Major League Baseball draft after two seasons at Tulane University.

He was called up by the Yankees on September 5, 2006, as a September call-up after spending six seasons in the Yankee farm system with the Staten Island Yankees, Tampa Yankees, Trenton Thunder, and Columbus Clippers.

Cannizaro played in his first major league game on September 5, 2006, playing at shortstop for two innings, without an at-bat, against the Kansas City Royals. Cannizaro singled in the first at-bat of his career on September 8, 2006, against Brian Burres of the Baltimore Orioles, and later scored. He hit his first major league home run on September 25, 2006, off Jon Switzer in a 16–1 win against the Tampa Bay Devil Rays. Cannizaro signed a minor league contract with the Tampa Bay Rays during the 2007-2008 offseason. He made his Rays debut on May 3, 2008. On August 4, 2008, Cannizaro was traded to the Cleveland Indians and assigned to Triple-A Buffalo. On August 13, 2009, just one year after being traded to the Cleveland Indians Cannizaro was traded to the Chicago White Sox. In October 2009 Cannizaro was granted free agency.

== Coaching career ==
In 2014, Cannizaro was named hitting coach and recruiting coordinator at LSU.

On November 5, 2016, Mississippi State University Athletic Director John Cohen, who had recently stepped down as head baseball coach, announced Cannizaro as his successor.

On February 19, 2018, Cannizaro resigned as the head coach of Mississippi State University's baseball team after it was discovered that he had an extramarital affair with a Mississippi State football staff assistant. At the time he was married with two children, and his wife was reportedly pregnant with a third child. His resignation was accepted immediately by Athletic Director John Cohen. His resignation came three games into the Diamond Dawgs’ season.

On February 22, 2019, Holy Cross High School of New Orleans announced that Cannizaro would become the school's head baseball coach starting June 1, replacing Trey Guillot.

== Family ==
Cannizaro has two younger brothers. Lee Cannizaro attended the University of Southern Mississippi where he played college baseball. His youngest brother, Garrett Cannizaro, 27, attended Tulane University where he played baseball.

== Head coaching record ==
Record table
Season	Team	Overall	Conference	Standing	Postseason
Mississippi State Bulldogs (Southeastern Conference) (2017–2018)
2017	Mississippi State	40–27	17–13	3rd (West)	NCAA Super Regional
2018	Mississippi State	0–3*	0–0*		
Mississippi State:		40–30 (.571)	17–13 (.567)		
Total:		40–30 (.571)			
National champion Postseason invitational champion Conference regular season champion Conference regular season and conference tournament champion Division regular season champion Division regular season and conference tournament champion Conference tournament champion
