= Jacksen =

Jacksen is a given name. Notable people with the name include:

- Jacksen Pierce (1894–1939) American author
- Jacksen F. Tiago (born 1968), Brazilian footballer and manager

== See also ==
- Jackson (name)
