= Antoine Jacson =

Canadian soldier and wood carver

Antoine Jacson (c. 1725 – 6 December 1803) was a Canadian soldier and wood carver. Jacson worked as a master wood carver in Quebec, contributing friezes, rosettes and other decorative elements to churches throughout the province, including the Notre-Dame Basilica in Quebec City.
