= Jackson Irving Cope =

American academic (1925–1999)

Jackson Irving Cope (1 September 1925 - 6 August 1999) was Leo S. Bing professor emeritus of English at the University of Southern California. He is also listed in Ohio State Universities list of faculty, staff, alumni biographical files.

== Selected publications ==
- The Theater and the Dream: From Metaphor to Form in Renaissance Drama
- The Metaphoric Structure of Paradise Lost. Johns Hopkins Press, 1962.
- Dramaturgy of the Daemonic: Studies in Antigeneric Theater from Ruzante to Grimaldi
- Joseph Glanvill: Anglican Apologist
- Secret sharers in Italian comedy: from Machiavelli to Goldoni. Duke University Press, Durham, N.C., 1996.
