= Jackson Anderson =

American football player (born 1989)

Profile
- Position: Long snapper

Personal information
- Born: October 5, 1989 (age 37); Frisco, Texas
- Listed height: 6 ft 5 in (1.96 m)
- Listed weight: 275 lb (125 kg)

Career information
- College: Duke
- NFL draft: 2013: undrafted

Career history
- Dallas Cowboys (2013)*
- * Offseason or practice squad member only

Jackson Anderson (born October 6, 1989) is an American former football long snapper. He played college football at Duke.

== Professional career ==
The Houston Texans invited Anderson to their 2013 rookie minicamp on a tryout basis. He was not offered a contract at the conclusion of the minicamp.

On May 29, 2013, Anderson was signed by the Dallas Cowboys as an undrafted free agent. On August 11, 2013, he was waived by the Cowboys.
