= Jaxson =

Jaxson is a given name. It is a variant spelling of the given name Jackson.

== Notable people with the given name ==
- Jaxson Barham (born 1988), Australian rules footballer
- Jaxson Dart (born 2003), American football player
- Jaxson Davis (born 2009), American basketball player
- Jaxson de Ville, American football mascot
- Jaxson Hayes (born 2000), American basketball player
- Jaxson Kirkland (born 1998), American football player
- Jaxson Paulo (born 1999), New Zealand rugby league footballer
- Jaxson Rahme (born 2003), Lebanese rugby league footballer
- Jaxson Robinson (born 2002), American basketball player
- Jaxson Ryker (born 1982), American professional wrestler
- Jaxson Stauber (born 2000), American ice hockey player

== See also ==
- Jaxon (name), given name and surname
- Jackson (given name)
- Jackson (surname)
