= Jacson (footballer, born 1989) =

Brazilian footballer

Personal information
- Full name: Jacson da Paixão Neponuceno
- Date of birth: 16 December 1989 (age 36)
- Height: 1.80 m (5 ft 11 in)
- Position: Forward

Team information
- Current team: Gostaresh Foulad
- Number: 9

Senior career*
Years	Team	Apps	(Gls)
2010–2014	Bahia de Feira	26	(3)
2010	Vitória	3	(0)
2014	Oeste	5	(0)
2015	Colo Colo	11	(1)
2015–	Gostaresh Foulad	0	(0)
- * Club domestic league appearances and goals as of 22:12, 30 July 2015 (UTC)

Jacson da Paixão Neponuceno (born 16 December 1989), commonly known as Jacson, is a Brazilian professional footballer who currently plays for Iranian club Gostaresh Foulad F.C. as a forward.
