= Jay Jaxon =

American fashion designer (1941–2006)

- Born: August 30, 1941
- Died: July 19, 2006 (aged 64)
- Occupations: Fashion designer, costumer, couturier
- Years active: 1966–2006

Eugene Jackson (August 30, 1941 – July 19, 2006), known professionally as Jay Jaxon, was an American fashion designer, costumer, and couturier.

He was the first American and the first Black person to work as a couturier for a fashion atelier in Paris. He worked for the fashion houses Yves Saint Laurent, Christian Dior, and Jean-Louis Scherrer. Jaxon became creative director of the house of Jean-Louis Scherrer at the age of 24 and released his first haute couture collection as head designer in 1970.

After returning to the United States he designed clothing for film, television, and various performers.

== Early life ==
Born in Jamaica, Queens to father Sidney Jackson and mother Ethel Rena-Jackson, he was the youngest of four children. His mother worked as a housekeeper and his father worked for the Long Island Rail Road.

While in high school, Jaxon moved in with a nearby family to assist with childcare. The family frequently made their own clothes and it was there that Jaxon first learned about clothesmaking.

Jaxon earned a bachelor's degree from Hunter College in Manhattan and attended the New York University School of Law for about a year before changing paths. Jaxon told the Women's News Service in 1970 that he was inspired to work in fashion design after helping a girlfriend design a dress for a party. He then dropped out of law school, took a job as a bank teller to support himself and enrolled at the Fashion Institute of Technology (FIT).

While at FIT he met his boyfriend Kenneth Battelle, a hairstylist better known as Mr. Kenneth. Some of Battelle's high-profile clientele became Jaxon's first customers as a fashion designer. Jaxon graduated from FIT in 1966.

He changed his name to Jay Jaxon at the suggestion of fashion publicist Eleanor Lambert.

== Career ==
Two years after graduation, Jaxon created ready-to-wear designs for New York City department stores such as Henri Bendel and Bonwit Teller. By the end of the 1960s he moved to Paris, France. In Paris Jaxon worked for Yves Saint Laurent, as well as under Marc Bohan at Christian Dior before being hired by Jean-Louis Scherrer in 1969, becoming creative director of the Scherrer atelier at the age of 28.

Jaxon returned to New York City in the mid-1970s and started his own clothing brand, with a focus on high-end sportswear. He also designed sportswear for other fashion designers, such as John Kloss and Pierre Cardin, for his American collection. In the mid-1980s Jaxon moved to Los Angeles, designing clothing for the vocalist Annie Lennox, including a menswear-inspired suit that she wore during a drag performance at the 1984 Grammy Awards. Other clients included Sammy Davis Jr., Liza Minnelli, and Thelma Houston. Jaxon designed outfits worn by dancers who performed during a 1983 television tribute to Motown Records and designed clothing for such television shows as The Division, Angel, Sabrina The Teenage Witch, Ally McBeal, and American Dreams, as well as the films The Men's Club and Mr. & Mrs. Smith.

Jaxon's life's work was not well documented until 2018 when Rachel Fenderson, a Jamaican American fashion historian, designer, curator, and the lead authority on Jay Jaxon centered her master's thesis “JAY JAXON: A Biographical Study and Media Discourse Analysis Reinstating a Designer into Fashion History” on Jaxon while attending the Parsons School of Design. Fenderson was able to find over fifty newspaper articles mentioning Jaxon found in many of his designs in magazines but noted that, in some instances, he was not being tracked in the metadata of the archival databases of those publications. As a part of her research, Fenderson curated an exhibition about the designer, which was on display at such venues as the Mona Bismarck American Center in Paris in 2018 and at the Queens Historical Society in Queens, New York in 2020. In a 2021 article in The New York Times, it was reported that Fenderson was writing a book about Jaxon.

== Personal life ==
Jaxon lived for two decades in the Windsor Hills neighborhood of Los Angeles with his partner, Lloyd Hardy.

Jaxon died of complications of prostate cancer on July 19, 2006. He was 64. At the time of his death he was making plans to release a line of plus-size dresses.
