= Jackson Abugo =

South Sudanese politician

Jackson Abugo Gama is a South Sudanese politician. In 2011, he was an advisor on Political Affairs for the state of Central Equatoria. In 2015, Abugo was the secretary-general of the Sudan People's Liberation Movement in Central Equatoria. In 2018, Yei River State Governor Emmanuel Adil Anthony appointed Abugo to his cabinet as minister of physical infrastructure and as an advisor on political affairs.

== Political career ==
On Date 5, January, 2021, Emmanuel Adil Anthony appointed Jackson Bugo as the Commissioner of State Revenue Authority.
