= Jacson (footballer, born 1993) =

Brazilian association football player

Personal information
- Full name: Jacson Glei da Silva Clemente
- Date of birth: 10 July 1993 (age 33)
- Place of birth: Campos Altos, Brazil
- Height: 1.80 m (5 ft 11 in)
- Position: Forward

Team information
- Current team: Maquinados Ortiz

Youth career
- –2013: Atibaia
- 2013–2014: Club León
- 2014–2016: Deportivo Tepic

Senior career*
Years	Team	Apps	(Gls)
2013–2014	Club León	0	(0)
2018	Langsning	5	(1)
2018–	Maquinados Ortiz		
- * Club domestic league appearances and goals as of 23:42, 7 December 2018 (UTC)

Jacson Glei da Silva Clemente (born 13 March 1996), commonly known as Jacson, is a Brazilian professional footballer, who last played for Langsning F.C. in the I-League 2nd Division.

== Career statistics ==
=== Club ===
As of 7 December 2018.

Club	Season	League			Cup		Continental		Other		Total	
Club	Season	Division	Apps	Goals	Apps	Goals	Apps	Goals	Apps	Goals	Apps	Goals
Club León	2013–14	Liga MX	0	0	4 (Note: Appearances in the Copa Mexico)	1	–		0	0	4	1
Club León	2014–15	Liga MX	0	0	0	0	–		0	0	0	0
Club León	Total		0	0	4	1	0	0	0	0	4	1
Langsning	2017–18	I-League 2nd Division	0	0	0	0	–		0	0	0	0
Career total			0	0	4	1	0	0	0	0	4	1
