= Alex Lange =

American baseball player (born 1995)

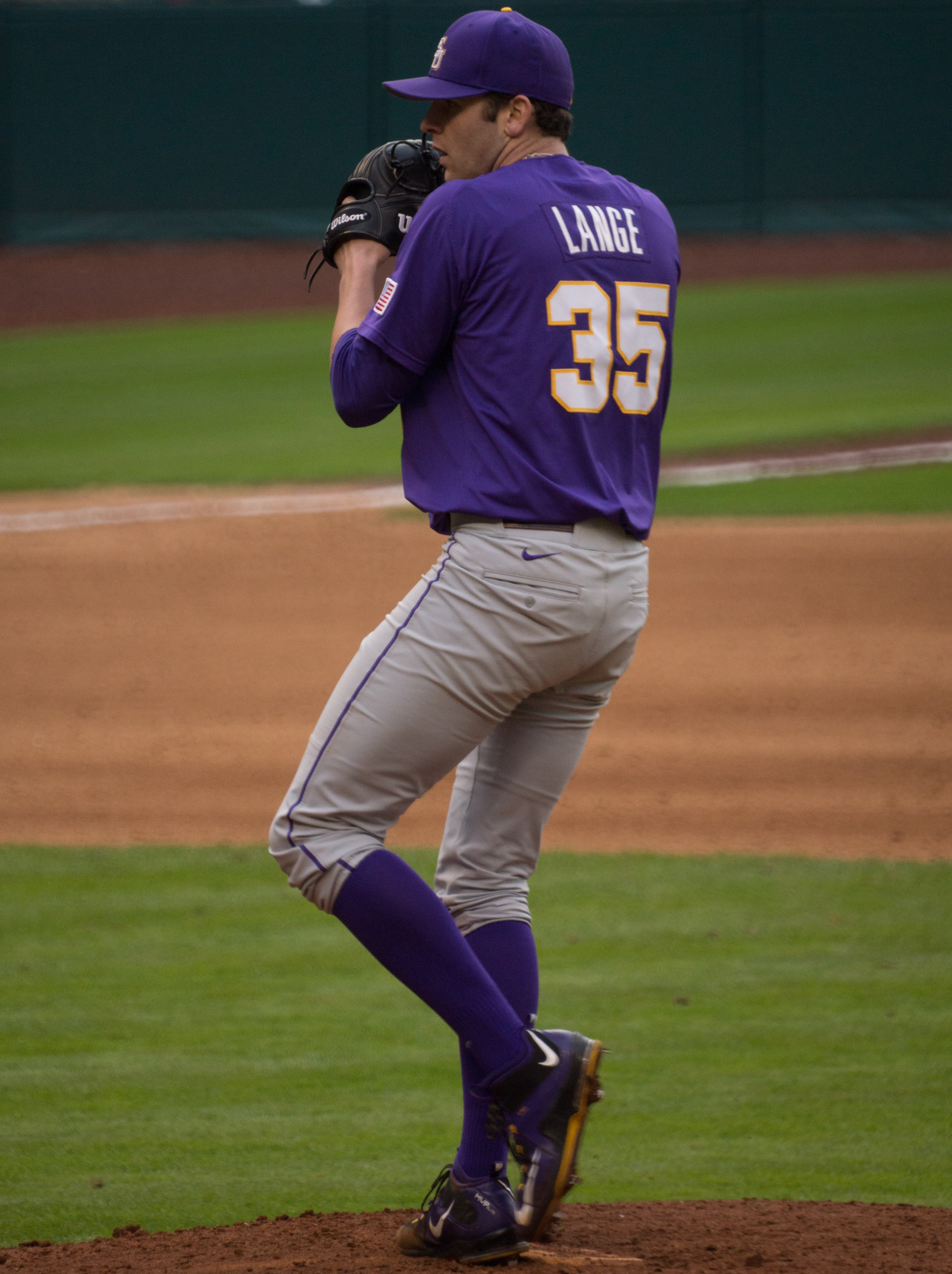
- Lange with the LSU Tigers in 2015

Free agent
- Pitcher
- Born: October 2, 1995 (age 31); Riverside, California, U.S.
- Bats: Right Throws: Right

MLB debut
- April 10, 2021, for the Detroit Tigers

MLB statistics (through 2026 season)
- Win–loss record: 17–22
- Earned run average: 4.45
- Strikeouts: 282
- Saves: 39
- Stats at Baseball Reference

Teams
- Detroit Tigers (2021–2025); Kansas City Royals (2026)

Career highlights and awards
- Pitched a combined no-hitter on July 8, 2023

Alexander Craig Lange (born October 2, 1995) is an American professional baseball pitcher who is a free agent. He has previously played in Major League Baseball (MLB) for the Detroit Tigers and Kansas City Royals. Lange played college baseball for the LSU Tigers, and was selected by the Chicago Cubs in the first round of the 2017 MLB draft.

== Career ==
Lange was adopted when he was a baby. He attended Lee's Summit West High School in Lee's Summit, Missouri and maintained a 4.0 weighted GPA. As a senior, Lange was named the Missouri Gatorade Baseball Player of the Year (2014). He was scouted by many NCAA Division I colleges, but chose to attend Louisiana State University (LSU).

As a college freshman in 2015, Lange was a consensus All-American. He was also named the National Freshman Pitcher of the Year by Louisville Slugger and the National Collegiate Baseball Writers Association and helped lead LSU to the College World Series. LSU returned to the College World Series in 2017, and facing top-ranked Oregon State in his first College World Series start, Lange pitched seven innings and allowed only two hits to lead LSU to victory.

=== Chicago Cubs ===
The Chicago Cubs selected Lange with the 30th pick in the first round of the 2017 MLB draft. He signed with the Cubs and was assigned to the Eugene Emeralds of the Class A-Short Season Northwest League, where he posted an 0–1 win–loss record with a 4.82 earned run average (ERA) in 9 1/3 innings pitched. MLB.com ranked Lange as Chicago's fifth best prospect going into the 2018 season. He spent the 2018 season with the Myrtle Beach Pelicans of the Class A-Advanced Carolina League, going 6–8 with a 3.74 ERA in 23 starts. Lange began 2019 back with Myrtle Beach.

=== Detroit Tigers ===
On July 31, 2019, the Cubs traded Lange and Paul Richan to the Detroit Tigers in exchange for Nick Castellanos. He was assigned to the Erie SeaWolves. Over 27 games (18 starts) between Myrtle Beach and Erie, he went 5–13 with a 5.45 ERA, striking out 94 batters over 102 1/3 innings. He was selected to play in the Arizona Fall League for the Mesa Solar Sox following the season. Lange did not play in a game in 2020 due to the cancellation of the minor league season because of the COVID-19 pandemic. On November 20, 2020, the Tigers added Lange to their 40-man roster to protect him from the Rule 5 draft.

On April 10, 2021, Lange was promoted to the majors for the first time and made his Major League debut that day, throwing a scoreless inning. On September 20, 2021, Lange recorded his first career save with a perfect 1–2–3 ninth inning against the Chicago White Sox. He earned his first major league win on September 30 with 1 1/3 innings of scoreless relief against the Minnesota Twins. Overall, Lange made 36 appearances for the 2021 Tigers, posting a 1–3 record and 4.04 ERA, while striking out 39 batters in 35 2/3 innings.

In 2022, Lange primarily filled a middle relief and setup role. He led the Tigers with 71 appearances, posting a 7–4 record and a 3.69 ERA, with 82 strikeouts in 63 1/3 innings.

On July 8, 2023, Lange pitched the last inning of a combined no-hitter against the Toronto Blue Jays. While Tigers manager A. J. Hinch resisted naming a full-time closer for the 2023 season, Lange made the most appearances for the team in save situations. On the season, he saved 26 games in 32 opportunities. He posted a 7–5 record and a 3.68 ERA, while striking out 79 batters in 66 innings.

Lange made 21 appearances for Detroit in 2024, compiling an 0–3 record and 4.34 ERA with 21 strikeouts across 18 2/3 innings pitched. The Tigers optioned Lange to the Toledo Mud Hens in late May, 2024. On June 18, 2024, it was announced that Lange would undergo surgery to repair an avulsion in his right lat.

Lange began the 2025 season on the 60-day injured list while he recovered from his surgery and was activated off the list on August 18, 2025. Lange was optioned back to Toledo four days later after making one appearance for the Tigers. On November 12, Lange was designated for assignment by Detroit following the acquisition of Dugan Darnell. He was released by the Tigers on November 18.

=== Kansas City Royals ===
On November 20, 2025, Lange signed a one-year, $900,000 contract with the Kansas City Royals. He made 59 appearances for the Royals in 2026, posting a 2–7 record and 6.75 ERA with 60 strikeouts and 10 saves over 60 appearances. On October 23, 2026, Lange was removed from the 40–man roster and sent outright to the Triple–A Omaha Storm Chasers. He elected free agency on November 2.

Awards and achievements
| Preceded by Domingo Germán | No-hitter pitcher July 8, 2023 (with Jason Foley & Matt Manning) | Succeeded by Framber Valdez |
