= Jared Poché =

American baseball player (born 1994)

- Pitcher
- Born: November 21, 1994 (age 30); New Orleans, Louisiana, U.S.
- Bats: Right Throws: Left

Jared Marcus Poché (born November 21, 1994) is an American former professional baseball pitcher.

== Career ==
Poché attended Lutcher High School in Lutcher, Louisiana. Lutcher won the Class 4A state championship in 2013. He enrolled at Louisiana State University (LSU) to play college baseball for the LSU Tigers. He had a 9–3 win–loss record and 2.45 earned run average (ERA) as a freshman for the Tigers. The National Collegiate Baseball Writers Association and Collegiate Baseball named him a Freshman All-American in 2014. After the 2014 season, he played collegiate summer baseball with the Harwich Mariners of the Cape Cod Baseball League.

Poché finished his junior year with a 9–4 record and a 3.35 ERA. The San Diego Padres selected Poché in the 14th round of the 2016 MLB draft. He decided to return to LSU for his senior season, turning down a $150,000 signing bonus. As a senior, he threw a no-hitter, the first for LSU since 1979, and set the LSU career record for wins.

The Oakland Athletics selected Poché in the ninth round of the 2017 MLB draft. He signed with the Athletics, and made his professional debut for the Vermont Lake Monsters. However, he only played in one game, pitching two innings, before he was placed on the 60 day disabled list, ending his season. In 2018, he made his season debut with Vermont before being promoted to the Beloit Snappers, where he finished the year. In 25 games (22 starts) for Beloit he pitched to an 8-6 record with a 4.41 ERA.

Poché began 2019 with the Stockton Ports. He decided to retire from baseball in July 2019.

== Personal life ==
Poché's parents, Jerry and Tessa, are lifelong residents of Lutcher. His older brother, Corey, played college baseball for Nicholls State University, and taught Jared how to throw a changeup.
