= Jackson Kowar =

American baseball player (born 1996)

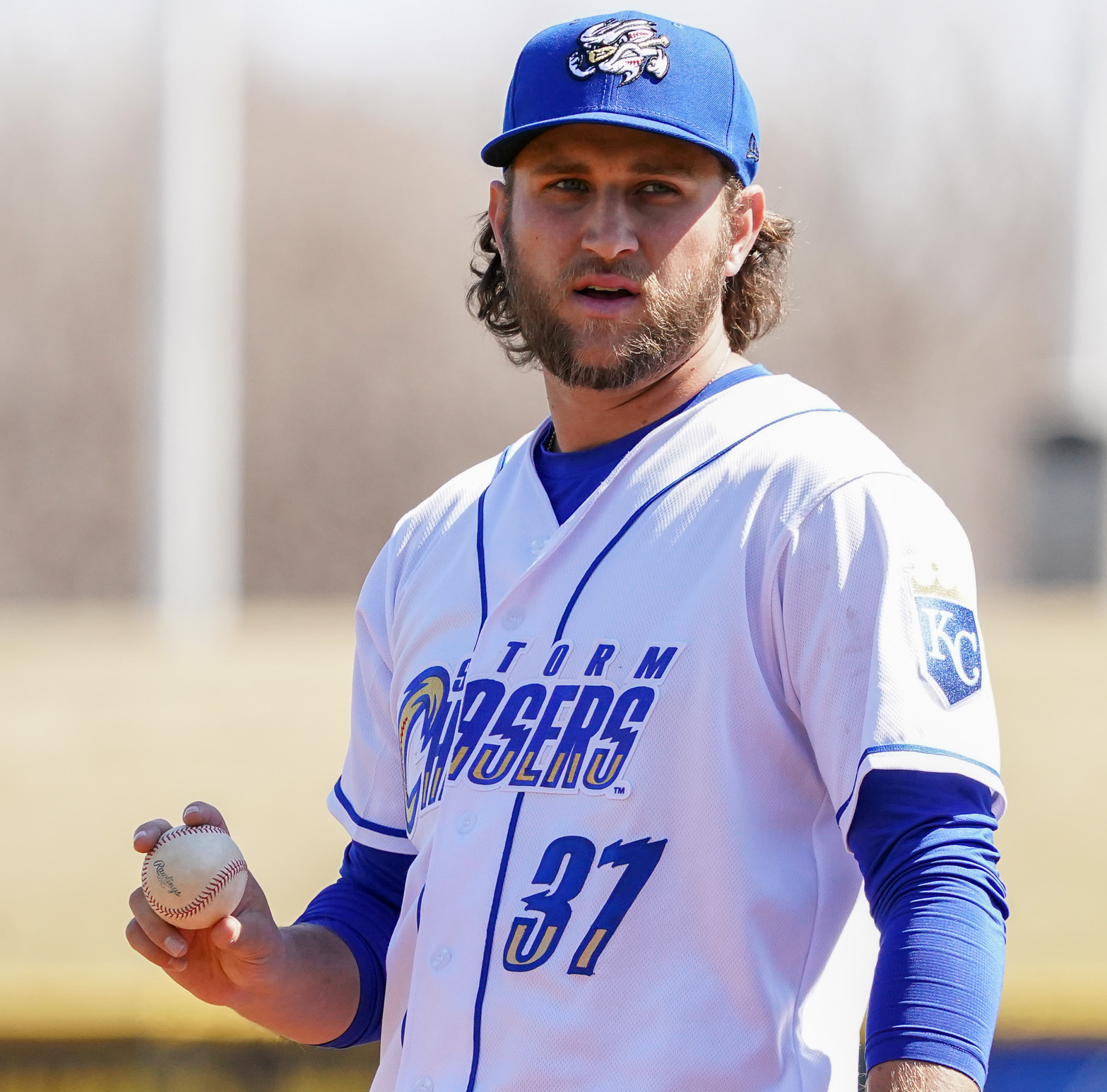
- Kowar with the Omaha Storm Chasers in 2023

Free agent
- Pitcher
- Born: October 4, 1996 (age 30); Weddington, North Carolina, U.S.
- Bats: Right Throws: Right

MLB debut
- June 7, 2021, for the Kansas City Royals

MLB statistics (through 2025 season)
- Win–loss record: 4–6
- Earned run average: 8.21
- Strikeouts: 90
- Stats at Baseball Reference

Teams
- Kansas City Royals (2021–2023); Seattle Mariners (2025)

Jackson Alexander Kowar (born October 4, 1996) is an American professional baseball pitcher who is a free agent. He has previously played in Major League Baseball (MLB) for the Kansas City Royals and Seattle Mariners.

== Amateur career ==
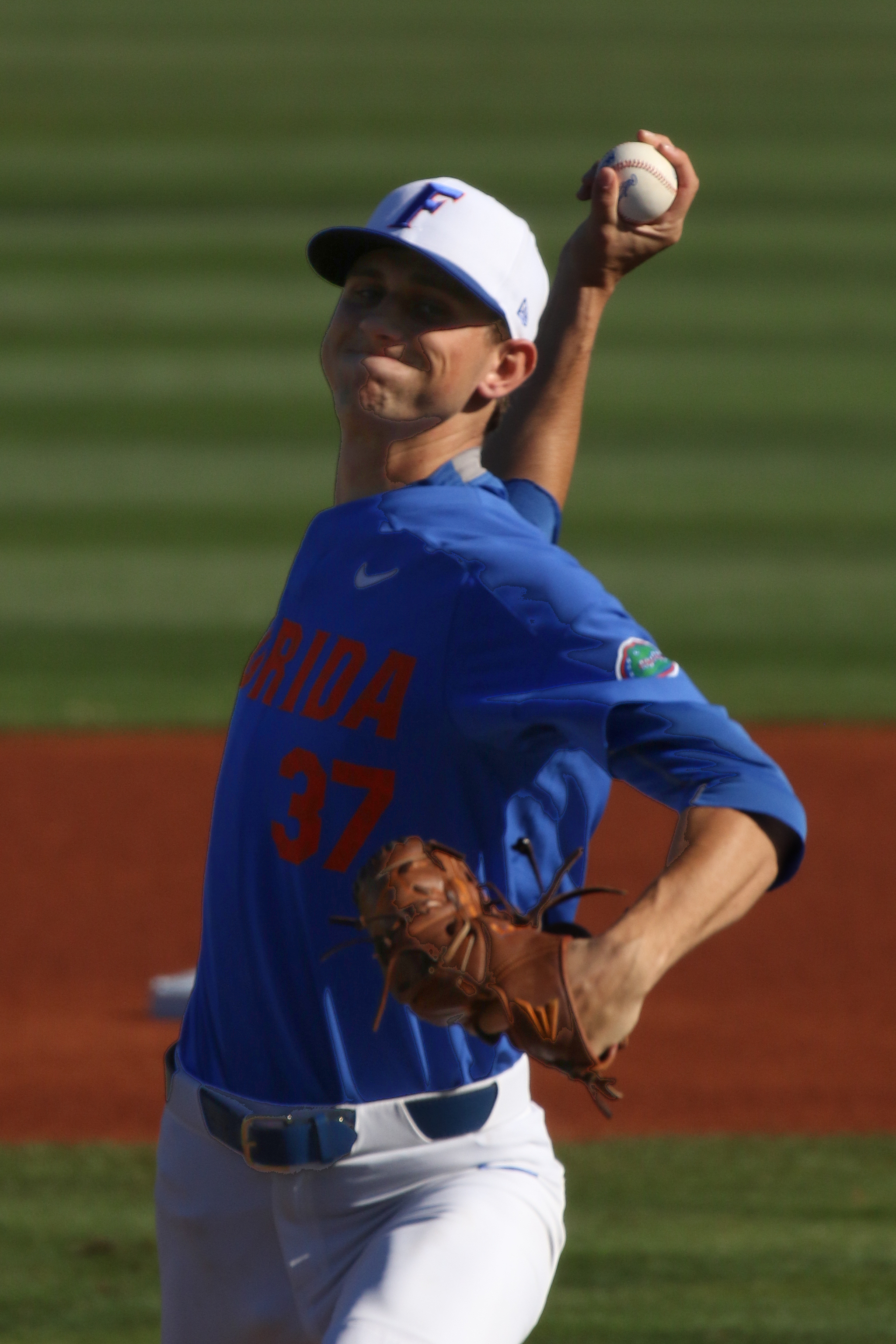
Kowar pitching for Florida in 2018

Kowar was born and raised in Weddington, North Carolina. He attended Charlotte Christian School in Charlotte, North Carolina. He became a pitcher on his high school baseball team his sophomore year, serving as the team's closer. As a senior, he compiled a 10–1 win–loss record and 0.20 earned run average (ERA) with 118 strikeouts in 71 innings pitched. He was drafted by the Detroit Tigers in the 40th round of the 2015 Major League Baseball draft but did not sign with the Tigers.

Kowar committed to play college baseball for Clemson University as a high school sophomore but was granted his release following a coaching change. He instead chose to attend the University of Florida. He was roommates with future Royals teammate Brady Singer. As a freshman in 2016 for the Gators, Kowar appeared in 12 games, with a 3–0 record, 3.37 ERA, and 44 strikeouts in 34 2/3 innings pitched. His season ended in May due to a collapsed lung. In 2017, he went 12–1, tying Florida's best single-season record in school history, along with posting a 4.08 ERA with 84 strikeouts in 19 games. Kowar earned the save in the College World Series championship game, pitching 1 2/3 scoreless innings in his only relief appearance on the season, clinching Florida's 2017 national title. In 2018, as a junior, Kowar was named to the All-SEC second team. He had a 10–5 record and a 3.04 ERA in 18 starts.

== Professional career ==
=== Kansas City Royals ===
Kowar was selected by the Kansas City Royals with the 33rd overall pick in the 2018 Major League Baseball draft, and he signed for $2.1 million. He made his professional debut that July with the Lexington Legends of the Single-A South Atlantic League. In nine starts, he went 0–1 with a 3.42 ERA. He began 2019 with the Wilmington Blue Rocks of the High–A Carolina League, with whom he was named an All-Star. After pitching to a 5–3 record and 3.53 ERA in 13 starts, he was promoted to the Northwest Arkansas Naturals of the Double-A Texas League in June, where he finished the season. Over 13 starts with the Naturals, he went 2–7 with a 3.51 ERA, striking out 78 over 74 1/3 innings.

Kowar did not play in a game in 2020 due to the cancellation of the minor league season because of the COVID-19 pandemic. He trained at the team's alternate site during the abbreviated MLB season. Kowar began the 2021 season with the Omaha Storm Chasers of the Triple-A East league. In six games to begin the year, Kowar had a 5–0 record and 0.85 ERA with 41 strikeouts in 31 1/3 innings pitched.

On June 6, 2021, the Royals announced Kowar would be promoted to the major leagues to be the starting pitcher the following day against the Los Angeles Angels. He was officially selected to the active roster on June 7. In his debut, Kowar gave up four earned runs, allowed three hits, walked two batters, and threw three wild pitches before he was removed from the game in the first inning, getting only two outs. In 9 appearances (8 starts) during his rookie campaign, Kowar posted a ghastly 0–6 record and 11.27 ERA with 29 strikeouts in 30 1/3 innings pitched. He received the Paul Splittorff Pitcher of the Year award from the Royals, given to the franchise's best minor league pitcher.

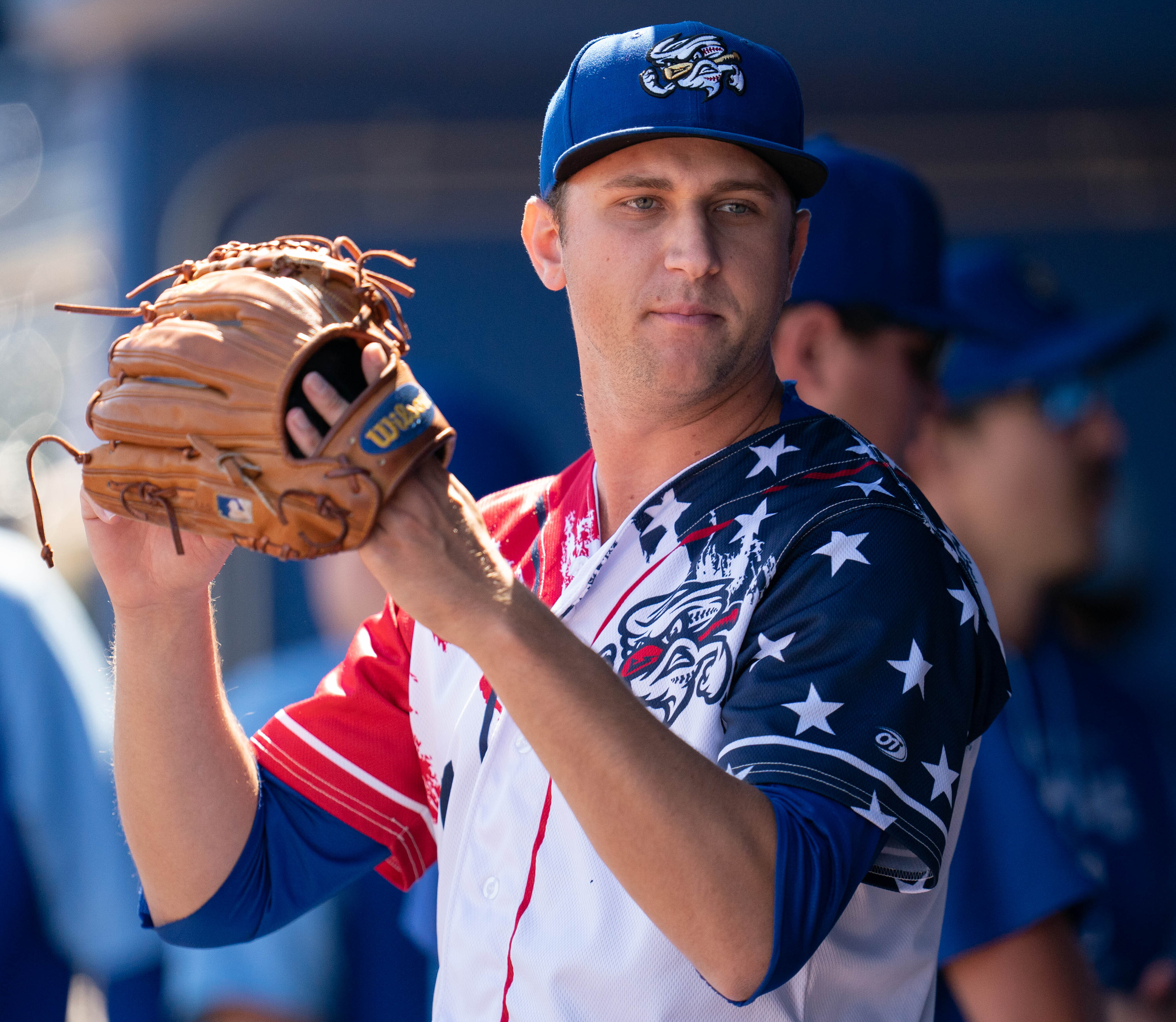
Kowar with Omaha in 2022

In 2022, Kowar struggled in both Omaha and Kansas City. Starting 20 games for the Storm Chasers, he worked to a 4–10 record and 6.16 ERA with 88 strikeouts in 83 1/3 innings pitched. He limped to a 9.77 ERA with 17 strikeouts in 15 2/3 innings of work across 7 relief appearances for the Royals.

Kowar began the 2023 season in Omaha and was called up to the Royals four times, sticking with the team after being recalled on August 17. In 23 appearances relief for Kansas City, Kowar struggled to a 6.43 ERA with 29 strikeouts across 28 innings of work.

=== Seattle Mariners ===
On November 17, 2023, the Royals traded Kowar to the Atlanta Braves in exchange for pitcher Kyle Wright. On December 3, he was traded with Cole Phillips by Atlanta to the Seattle Mariners in exchange for Jarred Kelenic, Marco Gonzales, and Evan White. On March 10, 2024, the Mariners announced Kowar had a tear in his right ulnar collateral ligament, requiring Tommy John surgery and ending his season. The placement was Kowar's first time on the injured list in his career.

Kowar was placed back on the 60-day injured list prior to the start of the 2025 season, and made rehabilitation appearances for the Triple-A Tacoma Rainiers and rookie-level Arizona Complex League Mariners. On May 28, 2025, Kowar was activated from the injured list. In 15 appearances for Seattle, he posted a 2-0 record and 4.24 ERA with 15 strikeouts over 17 innings of work. Kowar was designated for assignment by the Mariners on January 27, 2026.

=== Baltimore Orioles ===
On February 3, 2026, Kowar was claimed off waivers by the Minnesota Twins. On February 12, Kowar was designated for assignment following the acquisition of Anthony Banda. Two days later, he was traded to the Baltimore Orioles in exchange for cash considerations. On March 25, Kowar was designated for assignment by the Orioles after failing to make the team's Opening Day roster. The following day, he cleared waivers and was sent outright to the Triple-A Norfolk Tides. On June 29, he was placed on the full-season injured list ruling him out for the remainder of the season following him needing surgery on his right shoulder. In 5 games with Triple-A Norfolk Tides he threw 5 innings of relief going 0-1 with a 3.60 ERA and 5 strikeouts. He elected free agency on November 2.

== Personal life ==
Kowar married Caroline Kowar (née Kerns) in 2024.

Kowar's father, Frank Kowar, was a minor league pitcher in the Toronto Blue Jays organization in 1990.
