= 2017 Texas A&M Aggies baseball team =

American college baseball season

2017 Texas A&M Aggies baseball

Houston Regional champions College Station Super Regional champions

College World Series
- Conference: Southeastern Conference
- Western Division

Ranking
- Coaches: No. 8
- CB: No. 10
- Record: 41–21 (16–14 SEC)
- Head coach: Rob Childress (12th season)
- Assistant coaches: Justin Seely (8th season); Will Bolt (3rd season)
- Home stadium: Olsen Field at Blue Bell Park

2017 Southeastern Conference baseball standings
	Conf.						Overall
Team	W		L		T	PCT	W		L		T	PCT
Eastern
No. 1 Florida ^{x}‍†‍‍^{y}	21	–	9	–	0	.700	52	–	19	–	0	.732
No. 10 Kentucky ‍‍‍^{y}	19	–	11	–	0	.633	43	–	23	–	0	.652
No. 15 Vanderbilt ‍‍‍^{y}	15	–	13	–	1	.534	36	–	25	–	1	.589
Missouri ‍‍‍	14	–	16	–	0	.467	36	–	23	–	0	.610
South Carolina ‍‍‍	13	–	17	–	0	.433	35	–	25	–	0	.583
Georgia ‍‍‍	11	–	19	–	0	.367	25	–	32	–	0	.439
Tennessee ‍‍‍	7	–	21	–	0	.250	27	–	25	–	0	.519
Western
No. 2 LSU ^{x}‍†‍‡‍^{y}	21	–	9	–	0	.700	52	–	20	–	0	.722
No. 22 Arkansas ‍‍‍^{y}	18	–	11	–	0	.621	45	–	19	–	0	.703
No. 13 Mississippi State ‍‍‍^{y}	17	–	13	–	0	.567	40	–	27	–	0	.597
No. 8 Texas A&M ‍‍‍^{y}	16	–	14	–	0	.533	41	–	23	–	0	.641
No. 29 Auburn ‍‍‍^{y}	16	–	14	–	0	.533	37	–	26	–	0	.587
Ole Miss ‍‍‍	14	–	16	–	0	.467	32	–	25	–	0	.561
Alabama ‍‍‍	5	–	24	–	1	.183	19	–	34	–	1	.361
x – Division champion † – Conference champion ‡ – Tournament champion y – Invited to the NCAA tournament Rankings from Collegiate Baseball

The 2017 Texas A&M Aggies baseball team represented the Texas A&M University in the 2017 NCAA Division I baseball season. The Aggies played their home games at Olsen Field at Blue Bell Park.

The Aggies reached the College World Series for the sixth time in school history.

== Personnel ==
=== Roster ===
2017 Texas A&M Aggies roster
Pitchers: 12 - Corbin Martin - Junior; 14 - John Doxakis - Freshman; 15 - Brigham Hill - Junior; 20 - Tristen Bayless - Freshman; 21 - Cason Sherrod - Junior; 22 - Jason Ruffcorn - Freshman; 23 - Turner Larkins - Junior; 27 - Kyle Richardson - Freshman; 28 - Mason Cole - Freshman; 30 - John Kutac - Freshman; 32 - Stephen Kolek - Sophomore; 33 - Landon Miner - Freshman; 34 - Mitchell Kilkenny - Sophomore; 41 - Lee May Gonzalez - Junior; 56 - Kaylor Chafin - Junior	Catchers: 5 - Logan Foster - Freshman; 10 - Hunter Coleman - Freshman; 36 - Baine Schoenvogel - Junior; 54 - Cole Bedford - Sophomore; Infielders: 1 - Tommy Gillman - Freshman; 3 - Jorge Gutierrez - Freshman; 8 - Braden Shewmake - Freshman; 11 - Tanner James - Freshman; 17 - Joel Davis - Senior; 25 - Austin Homan - Senior; 40 - Chris Andritsos - Sophomore; 44 - George Janca - Sophomore	Outfielders: 2 - Tim Lichty - Junior; 4 - Cam Blake - Freshman; 9 - Walker Pennington - Senior; 13 - Blake Kopetsky - Senior; 18 - Nick Choruby - Senior; 31 - Trey Jimmerson - (redshirt) Freshman; 37 - Coll Stanley - (redshirt) Freshman

=== Coaching staff ===
2017 Texas A&M baseball coaching staff
- Rob Childress – Head Coach - 12th year
- Justin Seely – Assistant Coach - 8th year
- Will Bolt – Assistant Coach - 3rd year
- Jake Carlson – Volunteer Assistant Coach - 2nd year
- Jason Hutchins – Director of Baseball Operations - 19th year
- Jeremy McMillan – Sports Performance Coach - 6th year

== Schedule and results ==
2017 Texas A&M Aggies baseball game log
Regular season

February
Date	Opponent	Rank	Site/stadium	Score	Win	Loss	Save	Attendance	Overall record	SEC record
Feb 17	Bowling Green*		Olsen Field at Blue Bell Park • College Station, TX	W 15–1	Hill (1–0)	Anderson (0–1)	None	7,209	1–0	
Feb 18	Bowling Green*		Olsen Field at Blue Bell Park • College Station, TX	W 19–2	Kolek (1–0)	Croy (0–1)	None		2–0	
Feb 18	Bowling Green*		Olsen Field at Blue Bell Park • College Station, TX	W 16–5	Kilkenny (1–0)	Carey (0–1)	None	6,355	3–0	
Feb 21	Stephen F. Austin*		Olsen Field at Blue Bell Park • College Station, TX	W 6–5^{12}	Cole (1–0)	Ponder (0–1)	None	4,418	4–0	
Feb 24	Pepperdine*		Olsen Field at Blue Bell Park • College Station, TX	W 3–0	Hill (2–0)	Wilson (0–1)	Sherrod (1)	6,121	5–0	
Feb 25	Pepperdine*		Olsen Field at Blue Bell Park • College Station, TX	L 1–2	Gamboa (1–0)	Martin (0–1)	Qsar (1)	6,130	5–1	
Feb 26	Pepperdine*		Olsen Field at Blue Bell Park • College Station, TX	W 10–6	Chafin (1–0)	Jensen (0–1)	None	4,938	6–1	
Feb 28	Prairie View A&M*		Olsen Field at Blue Bell Park • College Station, TX	W 9–2	Miner (1–0)	Williams (0–1)	None	4,116	7–1	

March
Date	Opponent	Rank	Site/stadium	Score	Win	Loss	Save	Attendance	Overall record	SEC record
Mar 1	Incarnate Word*		Olsen Field at Blue Bell Park • College Station, TX	W 12–5	Gonzalez (1–0)	Taggart (1–1)	None	4,191	8–1	
Mar 3	vs. Texas Tech*		Minute Maid Park • Houston, TX (Shriners Hospitals for Children College Classic)	W 9–0	Hill (3–0)	Martin (1–1)	None	17,145	9–1	
Mar 4	vs. TCU*		Minute Maid Park • Houston, TX (Shriners Hospitals for Children College Classic)	L 10–11^{15}	Feltman (1–0)	Chafin (1–1)	None	21,843	9–2	
Mar 5	vs. Baylor*		Minute Maid Park • Houston, TX (Shriners Hospitals for Children College Classic)	L 3–6	Montemayor (1–0)	Martin (0–2)	None	6,497	9–3	
Mar 7	Texas–Rio Grande Valley*		Olsen Field at Blue Bell Park • College Station, TX	W 16–7	Sherrod (1–0)	Delgado (1–1)	Bayless (1)	3,988	10–3	
Mar 8	Texas–Rio Grande Valley*		Olsen Field at Blue Bell Park • College Station, TX	W 7–4	Martin (1–2)	Witherspoon (0–1)	None	3,635	11–3	
Mar 10	Brown*		Olsen Field at Blue Bell Park • College Station, TX	W 6–4	Hill (4–0)	Taugner (0–1)	Miner (1)	4,279	12–3	
Mar 12	Brown*		Olsen Field at Blue Bell Park • College Station, TX	W 3–2	Martin (2–2)	Sliepka (0–1)	None	4,405	13–3	
Mar 12	Brown*		Olsen Field at Blue Bell Park • College Station, TX	W 5–1	Kilkenny (2–0)	Ritchie (0–2)	None	4,420	14–3	
Mar 14	at Texas*		UFCU Disch–Falk Field • Austin, TX	L 3–4	Kennedy (3–0)	Doxakis (0–1)	Shugart (2)	6,985	14–4	
Mar 17	Kentucky		Olsen Field at Blue Bell Park • College Station, TX	L 0–6	Hjelle (3–1)	Hill (4–1)	None	5,242	14–5	0–1
Mar 18	Kentucky		Olsen Field at Blue Bell Park • College Station, TX	L 6–7	Schaenzer (3–0)	Sherrod (1–1)	Salow (3)	5,796	14–6	0–2
Mar 19	Kentucky		Olsen Field at Blue Bell Park • College Station, TX	L 7–11	Lewis (3–1)	Kilkenny (2–1)	None	4,472	14–7	0–3
Mar 21	Rice*		Olsen Field at Blue Bell Park • College Station, TX	W 8–5	Doxakis (1–1)	Moss (0–1)	None	4,462	15–7	
Mar 24	at Vanderbilt		Hawkins Field • Nashville, TN	L 3–4	Wright (1–3)	Hill (4–2)	Hayes (4)	3,418	15–8	0–4
Mar 25	at Vanderbilt		Hawkins Field • Nashville, TN	L 3–17	Raby (4–2)	Kolek (1–1)	None	3,309	15–9	0–5
Mar 26	at Vanderbilt		Hawkins Field • Nashville, TN	W 6–4	Chafin (2–1)	Snider (2–2)	Kilkenny (1)	3,586	16–9	1–5
Mar 28	at Texas State*		Bobcat Ballpark • San Marcos, TX	W 9–3	Sherrod (2–1)	Pagano (2–2)	None	2,952	17–9	
Mar 30	at LSU		Alex Box Stadium • Baton Rouge, LA	W 4–0	Hill (5–2)	Lange (3–3)	None	10,072	18–9	2–5
Mar 31	at LSU		Alex Box Stadium • Baton Rouge, LA	L 4–7	Poche' (6–1)	Kolek (1–2)	None	11,308	18–10	2–6

April
Date	Opponent	Rank	Site/stadium	Score	Win	Loss	Save	Attendance	Overall record	SEC record
Apr 1	at LSU		Alex Box Stadium • Baton Rouge, LA	W 4–3	Martin (3–2)	Gilbert (1–1)	Kilkenny (2)	11,109	19–10	3–6
Apr 4	Dallas Baptist*		Olsen Field at Blue Bell Park • College Station, TX	W 7–3	Sherrod (3–1)	Johnson (0–1)	None	4,411	20–10	
Apr 7	Auburn		Olsen Field at Blue Bell Park • College Station, TX	L 1–2	Mize (5–1)	Hill (5–3)	Mitchell (2)	5,910	20–11	3–7
Apr 8	Auburn		Olsen Field at Blue Bell Park • College Station, TX	W 6–3	Chafin (3–1)	Thompson (4–1)	Kilkenny (3)	7,165	21–11	4–7
Apr 9	Auburn		Olsen Field at Blue Bell Park • College Station, TX	W 3–1	Kolek (2–2)	Daniel (2–2)	Kilkenny (4)	5,549	22–11	5–7
Apr 11	Abilene Christian*		Olsen Field at Blue Bell Park • College Station, TX	W 8–1	Doxakis (2–1)	Hanson (2–4)	None	3,984	23–11	
Apr 13	at Alabama		Sewell–Thomas Stadium • Tuscaloosa, AL	W 9–5	Sherrod (4–1)	Walters (4–4)	None	3,458	24–11	6–7
Apr 14	at Alabama		Sewell–Thomas Stadium • Tuscaloosa, AL	W 8–2	Martin (4–2)	Duarte (2–3)	None	4,087	25–11	7–7
Apr 15	at Alabama		Sewell–Thomas Stadium • Tuscaloosa, AL	W 3–2	Chafin (3–0)	Suchey (2–5)	Kilkenny (5)	4,477	26–11	8–7
Apr 18	Texas–Arlington*		Olsen Field at Blue Bell Park • College Station, TX	L 2–3	Gardner (2–1)	Larkins (0–1)	James (9)	1,939	26–12	
Apr 21	Tennessee		Olsen Field at Blue Bell Park • College Station, TX	W 2–1	Kilkenny (3–1)	Martin (4–4)	None	4,226	27–12	9–7
Apr 22	Tennessee		Olsen Field at Blue Bell Park • College Station, TX	W 3–1	Martin (5–2)	Stallings (2–1)	Kilkenny (6)	6,022	28–12	10–7
Apr 23	Tennessee		Olsen Field at Blue Bell Park • College Station, TX	L 3–5^{15}	Linginfelter (3–4)	Doxakis (2–2)	Schultz (1)	4,837	28–13	10–8
Apr 25	Texas A&M–Corpus Christi*		Olsen Field at Blue Bell Park • College Station, TX	W 5–2	Chafin (5–1)	Glover (0–1)	Sherrod (2)	3,935	29–13	
Apr 28	at Missouri		Taylor Stadium • Columbia, MO	W 11–1	Hill (6–3)	Bartlett (5–1)	None		30–13	11–8
Apr 28	at Missouri		Taylor Stadium • Columbia, MO	W 7–1	Chafin (6–1)	Houck (3–7)	None	838	31–13	12–8
Apr 30	at Missouri		Taylor Stadium • Columbia, MO	W 7–2	Kolek (3–2)	Montes De Oca (3–4)	Kilkenny (7)	476	32–13	13–8

May
Date	Opponent	Rank	Site/stadium	Score	Win	Loss	Save	Attendance	Overall record	SEC record
May 2	Houston Baptist*		Olsen Field at Blue Bell Park • College Station, TX	W 8–2	Larkins (1–1)	Smith (0–2)	None	4,124	33–13	
May 4	Mississippi State		Olsen Field at Blue Bell Park • College Station, TX	W 9–2	Hill (7–3)	Pilkington (5–4)	None	4,417	34–13	14–8
May 5	Mississippi State		Olsen Field at Blue Bell Park • College Station, TX	L 1–5	McQuary (2–1)	Martin (5–3)	Gordon (1)	5,490	34–14	14–9
May 6	Mississippi State		Olsen Field at Blue Bell Park • College Station, TX	L 3–4	Self (5–0)	Kilkenny (3–2)	None	6,295	34–15	14–10
May 12	at Ole Miss		Swayze Field • Oxford, MS	W 12–5	Chafin (7–1)	McArthur (3–5)	None	7,403	35–15	15–10
May 13	at Ole Miss		Swayze Field • Oxford, MS	L 4–6	Ethridge (2–2)	Doxakis (2–3)	Woolfolk (11)	8,132	35–16	15–11
May 14	at Ole Miss		Swayze Field • Oxford, MS	L 3–6	Parkinson (6–3)	Kolek (3–3)	Woolfolk (12)	7,228	35–17	15–12
May 16	Sam Houston State*		Olsen Field at Blue Bell Park • College Station, TX	L 2–8	Mills (6–3)	Larkins (1–2)	None	4,968	35–18	
May 18	Arkansas		Olsen Field at Blue Bell Park • College Station, TX	L 4–6^{10}	Reindl (3–1)	Kilkenny (3–3)	None	5,396	35–19	15–13
May 19	Arkansas		Olsen Field at Blue Bell Park • College Station, TX	W 5–2	Martin (6–3)	Taccolini (4–1)	Sherrod (3)	5,110	36–19	16–13
May 20	Arkansas		Olsen Field at Blue Bell Park • College Station, TX	L 0–8	Knight (7–4)	Kolek (3–4)	Kopps (2)	5,456	36–20	16–14

Postseason

SEC Tournament
Date	Opponent	Rank	Site/stadium	Score	Win	Loss	Save	Attendance	Overall record	SECT Record
May 23	Missouri		Hoover Metropolitan Stadium • Hoover, AL	L 7–12	Toelken (5–3)	Chafin (7–2)	None		36–21	0–1

NCAA Houston Regional
Date	Opponent	Rank	Site/stadium	Score	Win	Loss	Save	Attendance	Overall record	NCAAT record
June 2	vs. Baylor		Schroeder Park • Houston, TX	W 8–5	Hill (8–3)	Parsons (5–4)	Chafin (1)	3,402	37–21	1–0
June 3	vs. Iowa		Schroeder Park • Houston, TX	W 3–2	Martin (7–3)	Gallagher (8–2)	Chafin (2)	3,389	38–21	2–0
June 5	at Houston		Schroeder Park • Houston, TX	W 4–3	Kolek (4–4)	Bond (2–1)	Sherrod (4)	3,369	39–21	3–0

NCAA College Station Super Regional
Date	Opponent	Rank	Site/stadium	Score	Win	Loss	Save	Attendance	Overall record	NCAAT record
June 9	Davidson		Olsen Field at Blue Bell Park • College Station, TX	W 7–6^{15}	Doxakis (3–3)	Whitmire (3–4)	None	6,936	40–21	4–0
June 10	Davidson		Olsen Field at Blue Bell Park • College Station, TX	W 12–6	Doxakis (4–3)	Leonard (1–3)	Chafin (3)	7,058	41–21	5–0

NCAA College World Series
Date	Opponent	Rank	Site/stadium	Score	Win	Loss	Save	Attendance	Overall record	CWS record
June 18	Louisville		TD Ameritrade Park • Omaha, NE	L 4–8	McKay (11–3)	Martin (7–4)	None	23,437	41–22	0–1
June 20	TCU		TD Ameritrade Park • Omaha, NE	L 1–4	Howard (12–3)	Kolek (4–5)		17,940	41–23	0–2

== Record vs. conference opponents ==
Last two do not qualify for conf. tourn. Blank are not scheduled. Blue are home games, otherwise away.

2017 SEC baseball records Source: 2017 SEC baseball game results
Team	W–L	ALA	ARK	AUB	FLA	UGA	KEN	LSU	MSU	MIZZ	MISS	SCAR	TENN	TAMU	VAN	Team	Div	SR	SW
ALA	5–24		1–2	3–0	0–3	.	.	0–3	0–3	0–3	0–3	1–2	.	0–3	0–2	ALA	W7	1–9	1–6
ARK	18–11	2–1		1–2	.	3–0	.	1–2	3–0	2–1	1–2	.	1–1	2–1	2–1	ARK	W2	6–3	2–0
AUB	16–14	0–3	2–1		3–0	2–1	.	0–3	2–1	.	2–1	2–1	2–1	1–2	.	AUB	W5	7–3	1–2
FLA	21–9	3–0	.	0–3		3–0	2–1	2–1	.	3–0	3–0	2–1	1–2	.	2–1	FLA	E1	8–2	4–1
UGA	11–19	.	0–3	1–2	0–3		2–1	0–3	2–1	1–2	.	2–1	2–1	.	1–2	UGA	E6	4–6	0–3
KEN	19–11	.	.	.	1–2	1–2		2–1	1–2	2–1	2–1	2–1	3–0	3–0	2–1	KEN	E2	7–3	2–0
LSU	21–9	3–0	2–1	3–0	1–2	3–0	1–2		3–0	.	2–1	2–1	.	1–2	.	LSU	W1	7–3	4–0
MSU	17–13	3–0	0–3	1–2	.	1–2	2–1	0–3		.	3–0	2–1	3–0	2–1	.	MSU	W3	6–4	3–2
MIZZ	14–16	3–0	1–2	.	0–3	2–1	1–2	.	.		1–2	2–1	3–0	0–3	1–2	MIZZ	E4	4–6	2–2
MISS	14–16	3–0	2–1	1–2	0–3	.	1–2	1–2	0–3	2–1		.	.	2–1	2–1	MISS	W6	5–5	1–2
SCAR	13–17	2–1	.	1–2	1–2	1–2	1–2	1–2	1–2	1–2	.		3–0	.	1–2	SCAR	E5	2–8	1–0
TENN	7–21	.	1–1	1–2	2–1	1–2	0–3	.	0–3	0–3	.	0–3		1–2	1–1	TENN	E7	1–7	0–4
TAMU	16–14	3–0	1–2	2–1	.	.	0–3	2–1	1–2	3–0	1–2	.	2–1		1–2	TAMU	W4	5–5	2–1
VAN	15–13	2–0	1–2	.	1–2	2–1	1–2	.	.	2–1	1–2	2–1	1–1	2–1		VAN	E3	5–4	0–0
Team	W–L	ALA	ARK	AUB	FLA	UGA	KEN	LSU	MSU	MIZZ	MISS	SCAR	TENN	TAMU	VAN	Team	Div	SR	SW

Updated for entire regular season. Alabama and Vanderbilt had one tie game.
