= 2017 Ole Miss Rebels baseball team =

American college baseball season

2017 Ole Miss Rebels baseball
- Conference: Southeastern Conference
- Western Division

Ranking
- Coaches: No. 24
- CB: No. 22
- Record: 32–25 (12–15 SEC)
- Head coach: Mike Bianco (17th season)
- Assistant coach: Marc MacMillan (2nd season)
- Hitting coach: Mike Clement (3rd season)
- Pitching coach: Carl Lafferty (11th season)
- Home stadium: Swayze Field

2017 Southeastern Conference baseball standings
| | Conf. | | | | | | Overall |
| Team | W | | L | | T | PCT | W | | L | | T | PCT |
|---|---|---|---|---|---|---|---|---|---|---|---|---|
Eastern
| No. 1 Florida ^{x}‍†‍‍^{y} | 21 | – | 9 | – | 0 | .700 | 52 | – | 19 | – | 0 | .732 |
| No. 10 Kentucky ‍‍‍^{y} | 19 | – | 11 | – | 0 | .633 | 43 | – | 23 | – | 0 | .652 |
| No. 15 Vanderbilt ‍‍‍^{y} | 15 | – | 13 | – | 1 | .534 | 36 | – | 25 | – | 1 | .589 |
| Missouri ‍‍‍ | 14 | – | 16 | – | 0 | .467 | 36 | – | 23 | – | 0 | .610 |
| South Carolina ‍‍‍ | 13 | – | 17 | – | 0 | .433 | 35 | – | 25 | – | 0 | .583 |
| Georgia ‍‍‍ | 11 | – | 19 | – | 0 | .367 | 25 | – | 32 | – | 0 | .439 |
| Tennessee ‍‍‍ | 7 | – | 21 | – | 0 | .250 | 27 | – | 25 | – | 0 | .519 |
Western
| No. 2 LSU ^{x}‍†‍‡‍^{y} | 21 | – | 9 | – | 0 | .700 | 52 | – | 20 | – | 0 | .722 |
| No. 22 Arkansas ‍‍‍^{y} | 18 | – | 11 | – | 0 | .621 | 45 | – | 19 | – | 0 | .703 |
| No. 13 Mississippi State ‍‍‍^{y} | 17 | – | 13 | – | 0 | .567 | 40 | – | 27 | – | 0 | .597 |
| No. 8 Texas A&M ‍‍‍^{y} | 16 | – | 14 | – | 0 | .533 | 41 | – | 23 | – | 0 | .641 |
| No. 29 Auburn ‍‍‍^{y} | 16 | – | 14 | – | 0 | .533 | 37 | – | 26 | – | 0 | .587 |
| Ole Miss ‍‍‍ | 14 | – | 16 | – | 0 | .467 | 32 | – | 25 | – | 0 | .561 |
| Alabama ‍‍‍ | 5 | – | 24 | – | 1 | .183 | 19 | – | 34 | – | 1 | .361 |
x – Division champion † – Conference champion ‡ – Tournament champion y – Invited to the NCAA tournament Rankings from Collegiate Baseball

The 2017 Ole Miss Rebels Baseball team represented the University of Mississippi in the 2017 NCAA Division I baseball season. The Rebels played their home games in Swayze Field.

== Previous season ==
The Rebels finished the 2016 season 43–19 overall and 18–12 in the conference. The Rebels advanced to the semifinals of the SEC Tournament before suffering elimination at the hands of eventual champion Texas A&M in the semifinals. The Rebels earned regional hosting status in the 2016 NCAA Division I baseball tournament, but two straight losses to Utah and Tulane brought the season to an end.

=== 2016 MLB Draft Selections ===
The Rebels had six players selected in the 2016 MLB draft. The Rebels also had four signees drafted out of high school.

| Player | Position | Round | Overall | MLB Team |
|---|---|---|---|---|
| J.B. Woodman | Outfielder | 2 | 57 | Toronto Blue Jays |
| Errol Robinson | Shortstop | 6 | 191 | Los Angeles Dodgers |
| Henri Lartigue | Catcher | 7 | 197 | Philadelphia Phillies |
| Chad Smith | Pitcher | 11 | 323 | Miami Marlins |
| Brady Bramlett | Pitcher | 13 | 388 | Boston Red Sox |
| Wyatt Short | Pitcher | 13 | 404 | Chicago Cubs |
| Grae Kessinger† | Shortstop | 26 | 774 | San Diego Padres |
| Cooper Johnson† | Catcher | 28 | 828 | Cincinnati Reds |
| Will Ethridge† | Pitcher | 35 | 1047 | Seattle Mariners |
| Ryan Rolison† | Pitcher | 37 | 1104 | San Diego Padres |

†Grae Kessinger, Cooper Johnson, Will Ethridge, and Ryan Rolison were drafted out of high school, but decided to attend Ole Miss.

== Preseason ==
=== Preseason All-American teams ===
3rd Team

- Colby Bortles – Third Baseman (Collegiate Baseball)

=== SEC Media poll ===
In the 2017 SEC media poll, released February 10, 2017, the Rebels were predicted to finish third place in the Western Division.

Media poll (West)
| Predicted Finish | Team | Votes (1st Place) |
| 1 | LSU | 72 (13) |
| 2 | Texas A&M | 55 (1) |
| 3 | Ole Miss | 51 |
| 4 | Mississippi State | 36 |
| 5 | Arkansas | 27 |
| T6 | Alabama | 16 |
| T6 | Auburn | 16 |

=== Preseason All-SEC teams ===
2nd Team

- Tate Blackman – Second Baseman
- Colby Bortles – Third Baseman

== Roster ==
2017 Ole Miss Rebels roster
| Pitchers: 1 – DJ Miller – Sophomore; 10 – David Parkinson – Junior; 12 – Greer Holston – Freshman; 17 – Will Stokes – Junior; 18 – Connor Green – Sophomore; 19 – Andy Pagnozzi – Sophomore; 20 – Will Ethridge – Freshman; 22 – Ryan Rolison – Freshman; 24 – Dallas Woolfolk – Sophomore; 26 – James McArthur – Sophomore; 28 – Jackson Tavel – Freshman; 29 – Andrew Lowe – Sophomore; 31 – Jason Barber – Freshman; 33 – Sean Johnson – (redshirt) Senior; 36 – Thomas Spinelli – Freshman; 38 – Korey Bell – Freshman; 39 – Brady Feigl – (redshirt) Sophomore; 40 – Houston Roth – Freshman; 65 – Parker Caracci – (redshirt) Freshman | Catchers: 7 – Nick Fortes – Sophomore; 13 – Cooper Johnson – Freshman; 43 – Carson Klepzig – (redshirt) Freshman; Infielders: 3 – Bryce Blaum – Freshman; 4 – Tate Blackman – Junior; 11 – Chase Cockrell – Sophomore; 14 – Cole Zabowski – Freshman; 15 – Grae Kessinger – Freshman; 25 – Colby Bortles – Senior; 32 – Michael Fitzsimmons – (redshirt) Sophomore; 35 – Trace Tyre – Freshman | Outfielders: 27 – Bryan Seamster – Freshman; 42 – Tim Rowe – Junior; Utility: 2 – Ryan Olenek (INF/OF) – Sophomore; 6 – Thomas Dillard (C/OF) – Freshman; 8 – Will Golsan (INF/OF) – Junior; 9 – Kyle Watson (INF/OF) – Junior |

== Schedule and results ==
2017 Ole Miss Rebels baseball game log
Regular Season (32–25)

February (7–1)
| Date | Opponent | Rank | Site/stadium | Score | Win | Loss | Save | Attendance | Overall record | SEC record |
|---|---|---|---|---|---|---|---|---|---|---|
| Feb. 17 | No. 10 East Carolina | No. 24 | Swayze Field; Oxford, MS | **W** 5–4 | **David Parkinson (1–0)** | Evan Kruczynski (0–1) | **Will Stokes (1)** | 12,117 | 1–0 | — |
| Feb. 18 | No. 10 East Carolina | No. 24 | Swayze Field | **W** 3–2 | **Andy Pagnozzi (1–0)** | Sam Lanier (0–1) | **Will Stokes (2)** | 11,494 | 2–0 | — |
| Feb. 19 | No. 10 East Carolina | No. 24 | Swayze Field | **W** 8–6 | **Ryan Rolison (1–0)** | Hunter Hood (0–1) | **Dallas Woolfolk (1)** | 9,459 | 3–0 | — |
| Feb. 21 | Arkansas State | No. 24 | Swayze Field | **W** 16–4 | **Will Ethridge (1–0)** | Bo Ritter (0–1) | | 6,784 | 4–0 | — |
| Feb. 24 | UNC Wilmington | No. 24 | Swayze Field | **W** 7–2 | **David Parkinson (2–0)** | Alex Royalty (1–1) | **Dallas Woolfolk (2)** | 10,041 | 5–0 | — |
| Feb. 25 | UNC Wilmington | No. 24 | Swayze Field | **W** 8–4 | **Will Stokes (1–0)** | Austin Magestro (0–1) | | 9,159 | 6–0 | — |
| Feb. 26 | UNC Wilmington | No. 24 | Swayze Field | **W** 8–4 | **Brady Feigl (1–0)** | Logan Beehler (0–1) | **Dallas Woolfolk (3)** | 7,668 | 7–0 | — |
| Feb. 28 | Memphis | No. 24 | Swayze Field | **L** 6–9 | Drew Crosby (2–0) | **Greer Holston (0–1)** | Colton Hathcock (3) | 7,178 | 7–1 | — |

March (9–10)
| Date | Opponent | Rank | Site/stadium | Score | Win | Loss | Save | Attendance | Overall record | SEC record |
|---|---|---|---|---|---|---|---|---|---|---|
| March 3 | vs. Baylor | No. 24 | Minute Maid Park; Houston, TX | **L** 0–4 | Nick Lewis (3–0) | **David Parkinson (2–1)** | | 4,189 | 7–2 | — |
| March 4 | vs. No. 19 Texas Tech | No. 24 | Minute Maid Park | **L** 1–5 | Steven Gingery (3–0) | **James McArthur (0–1)** | | | 7–3 | — |
| March 5 | vs. No. 1 TCU | No. 24 | Minute Maid Park | **L** 3–5 | Jared Janczak (3–0) | **Brady Feigl (1–1)** | Durbin Feltman (3) | | 7–4 | — |
| March 7 | Georgia State | No. 20 | Swayze Field | **W** 1–0 | **Ryan Rolison (2–0)** | Brandon Baker (0–2) | **Will Stokes (3)** | 7,399 | 8–4 | — |
| March 8 | Georgia State | No. 20 | Swayze Field | **L** 0–2^{11} | Logan Barnette (2–0) | **Dallas Woolfolk (0–1)** | Rhett Harper (2) | 6,859 | 8–5 | — |
| March 10 | Furman | No. 20 | Swayze Field | **W** 2–0 | **David Parkinson (3–1)** | Will Gaddis (1–2) | **Will Stokes (4)** | 7,375 | 9–5 | — |
| March 11 | Furman | No. 20 | Swayze Field | **W** 5–0 | **Brady Feigl (2–1)** | Grant Schuermann (3–1) | | 6,804 | 10–5 | — |
| March 12 | Furman | No. 20 | Swayze Field | **W** 1–0 | **Andy Pagnozzi (2–0)** | Heath Hawkins (2–1) | **Dallas Woolfolk (4)** | 6,924 | 11–5 | — |
| March 14 | vs. Nicholls | No. 19 | MGM Park; Biloxi, MS | **W** 5–0 | **Ryan Rolison (3–0)** | Kyle Craft (0–2) | | 3,064 | 12–5 | — |
| March 17 | No. 23 Vanderbilt | No. 19 | Swayze Field | **W** 1–0 | **David Parkinson (4–1)** | Kyle Wright (0–3) | **Dallas Woolfolk (5)** | 8,257 | 13–5 | 1–0 |
| March 18 | No. 23 Vanderbilt | No. 19 | Swayze Field | **L** 2–6 | Patrick Raby (3–2) | **Brady Feigl (2–2)** | | 9,010 | 13–6 | 1–1 |
| March 19 | No. 23 Vanderbilt | No. 19 | Swayze Field | **W** 10–8 | **Dallas Woolfolk (1–1)** | Penn Murfee (0–1) | | 8,221 | 14–6 | 2–1 |
| March 21 | Memphis | No. 14 | Autozone Park; Memphis, TN | **L** 1–2^{11} | Hunter Smith (1–0) | **Andy Pagnozzi (2–1)** | | 1,912 | 14–7 | 2–1 |
| March 23 | at No. 25 Kentucky | No. 14 | Cliff Hagan Stadium; Lexington, KY | **W** 9–6 | **James McArthur (1–1)** | Sean Hjelle (3–2) | **Dallas Woolfolk (6)** | 2,738 | 15–7 | 3–1 |
| March 24 | at No. 25 Kentucky | No. 14 | Cliff Hagan Stadium | **L** 2–4 | Zach Logue (4–1) | **Greer Holston (0–2)** | Logan Salow (5) | 2,270 | 15–8 | 3–2 |
| March 25 | at No. 25 Kentucky | No. 14 | Cliff Hagan Stadium | **L** 1–4 | Justin Lewis (4–1) | **Will Ethridge (1–1)** | Logan Salow (6) | 2,841 | 15–9 | 3–3 |
| March 28 | Little Rock | No. 22 | Swayze Field | **W** 5–4^{10} | **Houston Roth (1–0)** | McKinley Moore (0–1) | | 6,709 | 16–9 | 3–3 |
| March 30 | Mississippi State | No. 22 | Swayze Field | **L** 3–4 | Riley Self (4–0) | **Will Ethridge (1–2)** | Spencer Price (7) | 8,521 | 16–10 | 3–4 |
| March 31 | Mississippi State | No. 22 | Swayze Field | **L** 3–5 | Jacob Barton (2–0) | **David Parkinson (4–2)** | Spencer Price (8) | 11,017 | 16–11 | 3–5 |

April (11–6)
| Date | Opponent | Rank | Site/stadium | Score | Win | Loss | Save | Attendance | Overall record | SEC record |
|---|---|---|---|---|---|---|---|---|---|---|
| April 1 | Mississippi State | No. 22 | Swayze Field | **L** 1–2 | Jake Mangum (2–2) | **Ryan Rolison (3–1)** | Spencer Price (9) | 11,204 | 16–12 | 3–6 |
| April 4 | vs. No. 20 Southern Miss | | Trustmark Park; Pearl, MS | **W** 6–5^{12} | **Dallas Woolfolk (2–1)** | Austin Millet (0–2) | | 4,684 | 17–12 | 3–6 |
| April 7 | Alabama | | Swayze Field | **W** 7–2 | **James McArthur (2–1)** | Dylan Duarte (2–2) | | 8,456 | 18–12 | 4–6 |
| April 8 | Alabama | | Swayze Field | **W** 5–4 | **Dallas Woolfolk (3–1)** | Garret Suchey (1–4) | | 10,247 | 19–12 | 5–6 |
| April 9 | Alabama | | Swayze Field | **W** 8–2 | **Ryan Rolison (4–1)** | Sam Finnerty (1–3) | | 7,597 | 20–12 | 6–6 |
| April 11 | at No. 18 Southern Miss | | Pete Taylor Park; Hattiesburg, MS | **W** 6–2 | **Greer Holston (1–2)** | Taylor Braley (3–1) | **Brady Feigl (1)** | 5,458 | 21–12 | 6–6 |
| April 13 | at No. 8 LSU | | Alex Box Stadium; Baton Rouge, LA | **L** 2–15 | Alex Lange (4–4) | **James McArthur (2–2)** | | 10,439 | 21–13 | 6–7 |
| April 14 | at No. 8 LSU | | Alex Box Stadium | **W** 2–1 | **David Parkinson (5–2)** | Jared Poche' (6–2) | **Dallas Woolfolk (7)** | 11,203 | 22–13 | 7–7 |
| April 15 | at No. 8 LSU | | Alex Box Stadium | **L** 2–3 | Eric Walker (5–0) | **Ryan Rolison (4–2)** | Hunter Newman (5) | 10,757 | 22–14 | 7–8 |
| April 19 | Arkansas–Pine Bluff | | Swayze Field | **W** 14–6 | **Greer Holston (2–2)** | Nathan Sawrie (2–4) | | 7,578 | 23–14 | 7–8 |
| April 21 | Missouri | | Swayze Field | **L** 3–9 | Cole Bartlett (5–0) | **James McArthur (2–3)** | | 8,004 | 23–15 | 7–9 |
| April 22 | Missouri | | Swayze Field | **W** 3–1 | **Ryan Rolison (5–2)** | Tanner Houck (3–6) | **Dallas Woolfolk (8)** | 8,129 | 24–15 | 8–9 |
| April 23 | Missouri | | Swayze Field | **W** 9–6 | **Houston Roth (2–0)** | Bryce Montes De Oca (3–3) | **Will Ethridge (1)** | 7,208 | 25–15 | 9–9 |
| April 25 | vs. No. 13 Mississippi State; Governor's Cup | | Trustmark Park | **L** 2–4 | Denver McQuary (1–1) | **Greer Holston (2–3)** | Riley Self (2) | 8,536 | 25–16 | 9–9 |
| April 27 | at No. 11 Arkansas | | Baum Stadium; Fayetteville, AR | **W** 9–1 | **James McArthur (3–3)** | Blaine Knight (6–3) | | 7,419 | 26–16 | 10–9 |
| April 28 (1) | at No. 11 Arkansas | | Baum Stadium | **W** 4–1 | **Ryan Rolison (6–2)** | Trevor Stephan (4–3) | **Dallas Woolfolk (9)** | 8,492 (DH) | 27–16 | 11–9 |
| April 28 (2) | at No. 11 Arkansas | | Baum Stadium | **L** 4–7 | Jake Reindl (2–0) | **Will Stokes (1–1)** | Evan Lee (1) | 8,492 (DH) | 27–17 | 11–10 |

May (5–7)
| Date | Opponent | Rank | Site/stadium | Score | Win | Loss | Save | Attendance | Overall record | SEC record |
|---|---|---|---|---|---|---|---|---|---|---|
| May 2 | Louisiana–Monroe | | Swayze Field | **W** 21–7^{7} | **Houston Roth (3–0)** | Chase Cater (1–2) | | 8,042 | 28–17 | 11–10 |
| May 3 | Louisiana–Monroe | | Swayze Field | **W** 5–3 | **Sean Johnson (1–0)** | Stephen Morrison (0–1) | **Dallas Woolfolk (10)** | 7,224 | 29–17 | 11–10 |
| May 5 | at No. 7 Florida | | McKethan Stadium; Gainesville, FL | **L** 2–11 | Alex Faedo (7–1) | **James McArthur (3–4)** | | 3,447 | 29–18 | 11–11 |
| May 6 | at No. 7 Florida | | McKethan Stadium | **L** 4–7 | Nick Horvath (3–0) | **Dallas Woolfolk (3–2)** | Michael Byrne (12) | 4,227 | 29–19 | 11–12 |
| May 7 | at No. 7 Florida | | McKethan Stadium | **L** 4–6 | Jackson Kowar (8–0) | **David Parkinson (5–3)** | Michael Byrne (13) | 3,747 | 29–20 | 11–13 |
| May 12 | No. 19 Texas A&M | | Swayze Field | **L** 5–12 | Kaylor Chafin (7–1) | **James McArthur (3–5)** | | 7,403 | 29–21 | 11–14 |
| May 13 | No. 19 Texas A&M | | Swayze Field | **W** 6–4 | **Will Ethridge (2–2)** | John Doxakis (2–3) | **Dallas Woolfolk (11)** | 8,132 | 30–21 | 12–14 |
| May 14 | No. 19 Texas A&M | | Swayze Field | **W** 6–3 | **David Parkinson (6–3)** | Stephen Kolek (3–3) | **Dallas Woolfolk (12)** | 7,228 | 31–21 | 13–14 |
| May 16 | at Arkansas State | | Tomlinson Stadium–Kell Field; Jonesboro, AR | **L** 0–5 | Bryan Ayers (3–5) | **Sean Johnson (1–1)** | | 1,188 | 31–22 | 13–14 |
| May 18 | at No. 23 Auburn | | Plainsman Park; Auburn, AL | **L** 1–4 | Keegan Thompson (6–4) | **James McArthur (3–6)** | Cole Lipscomb (6) | | 31–23 | 13–15 |
| May 19 | at No. 23 Auburn | | Plainsman Park | **L** 1–9 | Davis Daniel (4–2) | **Ryan Rolison (6–3)** | | 2,896 | 31–24 | 13–16 |
| May 20 | at No. 23 Auburn | | Plainsman Park | **W** 8–4 | **Will Stokes (2–1)** | Calvin Coker (3–2) | | 3,003 | 32–24 | 14–16 |

Post-Season (0–1)

SEC Tournament (0–1)
| Date | Opponent | Seed | Site/stadium | Score | Win | Loss | Save | Attendance | Overall record | SECT record |
|---|---|---|---|---|---|---|---|---|---|---|
| May 23 | vs. (8) Auburn | (9) | Hoover Metropolitan Stadium; Hoover, AL | **L** 4–5 | Casey Mize (7–2) | **Will Stokes (2–2)** | | 2,930 | 32–25 | 0–1 |

Legend: = Win = Loss
Bold = Ole Miss team member

*Rankings are based on the team's current ranking in the Coaches Poll.

== Awards and honors ==
=== Award watch lists ===
Award watch lists
| Player | Award | Date awarded | Ref. |
|---|---|---|---|
| Will Stokes | NCBWA Stopper of the Year Award Watch List | February 13, 2017 | |
| Cooper Johnson | Johnny Bench Award Watch List | March 9, 2017 | |
| Colby Bortles | Senior CLASS Award candidate | March 27, 2017 | |

=== Regular season awards ===
Weekly Awards
| Player | Award | Date awarded | Ref. |
|---|---|---|---|
| Ryan Olenek | SEC Player of the Week | February 20, 2017 | |
| David Parkinson | SEC Pitcher of the Week | March 13, 2017 | |
| Ryan Rolison | SEC Freshman of the Week | April 24, 2017 | |
| James McArthur | SEC Pitcher of the Week | May 1, 2017 | |

=== All-SEC Awards ===
All Conference Awards
| Player | Award | Date awarded | Ref. |
|---|---|---|---|
| Colby Bortles | Second-team All-SEC, 3B | May 23, 2017 | |
| Ryan Rolison | Freshman All-SEC, SP | May 23, 2017 | |

=== All-American Awards ===
All-American Awards
| Player | Award | Date awarded | Ref. |
|---|---|---|---|
| Will Ethridge | Collegiate Baseball Freshman All-American, SP | June 7, 2017 | |
| Ryan Rolison | Collegiate Baseball Freshman All-American, SP | June 7, 2017 | |
| Houston Roth | Collegiate Baseball Freshman All-American, RP | June 7, 2017 | |

== 2017 MLB draft ==
| Player | Position | Round | Overall | MLB Team |
|---|---|---|---|---|
| David Parkinson | Pitcher | 12 | 353 | Philadelphia Phillies |
| Tate Blackman | Second baseman | 13 | 387 | Chicago White Sox |
| Colby Bortles | Third baseman | 22 | 665 | Detroit Tigers |
| **Brady Feigl** | Pitcher | 35 | 1045 | Los Angeles Angels |
| Kyle Watson | Shortstop | 37 | 1108 | Pittsburgh Pirates |

Players in bold did not sign.

== Record vs. conference opponents ==
Last two do not qualify for conf. tourn. Blank are not scheduled. Blue are home games, otherwise away.

2017 SEC baseball records Source: 2017 SEC baseball game results
| Team | W–L | ALA | ARK | AUB | FLA | UGA | KEN | LSU | MSU | MIZZ | MISS | SCAR | TENN | TAMU | VAN | Team | Div | SR | SW |
|---|---|---|---|---|---|---|---|---|---|---|---|---|---|---|---|---|---|---|---|
| ALA | 5–24 | | 1–2 | 3–0 | 0–3 | . | . | 0–3 | 0–3 | 0–3 | 0–3 | 1–2 | . | 0–3 | 0–2 | ALA | W7 | 1–9 | 1–6 |
| ARK | 18–11 | 2–1 | | 1–2 | . | 3–0 | . | 1–2 | 3–0 | 2–1 | 1–2 | . | 1–1 | 2–1 | 2–1 | ARK | W2 | 6–3 | 2–0 |
| AUB | 16–14 | 0–3 | 2–1 | | 3–0 | 2–1 | . | 0–3 | 2–1 | . | 2–1 | 2–1 | 2–1 | 1–2 | . | AUB | W5 | 7–3 | 1–2 |
| FLA | 21–9 | 3–0 | . | 0–3 | | 3–0 | 2–1 | 2–1 | . | 3–0 | 3–0 | 2–1 | 1–2 | . | 2–1 | FLA | E1 | 8–2 | 4–1 |
| UGA | 11–19 | . | 0–3 | 1–2 | 0–3 | | 2–1 | 0–3 | 2–1 | 1–2 | . | 2–1 | 2–1 | . | 1–2 | UGA | E6 | 4–6 | 0–3 |
| KEN | 19–11 | . | . | . | 1–2 | 1–2 | | 2–1 | 1–2 | 2–1 | 2–1 | 2–1 | 3–0 | 3–0 | 2–1 | KEN | E2 | 7–3 | 2–0 |
| LSU | 21–9 | 3–0 | 2–1 | 3–0 | 1–2 | 3–0 | 1–2 | | 3–0 | . | 2–1 | 2–1 | . | 1–2 | . | LSU | W1 | 7–3 | 4–0 |
| MSU | 17–13 | 3–0 | 0–3 | 1–2 | . | 1–2 | 2–1 | 0–3 | | . | 3–0 | 2–1 | 3–0 | 2–1 | . | MSU | W3 | 6–4 | 3–2 |
| MIZZ | 14–16 | 3–0 | 1–2 | . | 0–3 | 2–1 | 1–2 | . | . | | 1–2 | 2–1 | 3–0 | 0–3 | 1–2 | MIZZ | E4 | 4–6 | 2–2 |
| MISS | 14–16 | 3–0 | 2–1 | 1–2 | 0–3 | . | 1–2 | 1–2 | 0–3 | 2–1 | | . | . | 2–1 | 2–1 | MISS | W6 | 5–5 | 1–2 |
| SCAR | 13–17 | 2–1 | . | 1–2 | 1–2 | 1–2 | 1–2 | 1–2 | 1–2 | 1–2 | . | | 3–0 | . | 1–2 | SCAR | E5 | 2–8 | 1–0 |
| TENN | 7–21 | . | 1–1 | 1–2 | 2–1 | 1–2 | 0–3 | . | 0–3 | 0–3 | . | 0–3 | | 1–2 | 1–1 | TENN | E7 | 1–7 | 0–4 |
| TAMU | 16–14 | 3–0 | 1–2 | 2–1 | . | . | 0–3 | 2–1 | 1–2 | 3–0 | 1–2 | . | 2–1 | | 1–2 | TAMU | W4 | 5–5 | 2–1 |
| VAN | 15–13 | 2–0 | 1–2 | . | 1–2 | 2–1 | 1–2 | . | . | 2–1 | 1–2 | 2–1 | 1–1 | 2–1 | | VAN | E3 | 5–4 | 0–0 |
| Team | W–L | ALA | ARK | AUB | FLA | UGA | KEN | LSU | MSU | MIZZ | MISS | SCAR | TENN | TAMU | VAN | Team | Div | SR | SW |

Updated for entire regular season. Alabama and Vanderbilt had one tie game.

== Rankings ==
Ranking movements Legend: ██ Increase in ranking ██ Decrease in ranking — = Not ranked
| | Week | | | | | | | | | | | | | | | | | | |
| Poll | Pre | 1 | 2 | 3 | 4 | 5 | 6 | 7 | 8 | 9 | 10 | 11 | 12 | 13 | 14 | 15 | 16 | 17 | Final |
|---|---|---|---|---|---|---|---|---|---|---|---|---|---|---|---|---|---|---|---|
| Coaches' | 24 | 24* | | 20 | 19 | 14 | 22 | — | — | — | — | — | — | — | — | — | | | — |
| Baseball America | — | 22 | 20 | 21 | 18 | 11 | 20 | — | — | — | | | | | | | | | — |
| Collegiate Baseball^ | 22 | 14 | 9 | 25 | 25 | 23 | — | — | — | — | — | — | — | — | — | — | — | | — |
| NCBWA† | 27 | 21 | 13 | 18 | 26 | 17 | 23 | — | — | — | — | — | — | — | — | — | — | — | — |

^ Collegiate Baseball ranked 40 teams in their preseason poll, but only ranked 30 teams weekly during the season.
† NCBWA ranks 30 teams in their preseason poll, but only ranks 25 teams weekly during the season.
* A new poll was not released for this week, so for comparison purposes, the previous week's ranking is inserted in this week's slot.
