= 2017 Alabama Crimson Tide baseball team =

American college baseball season

2017 Alabama Crimson Tide baseball
- Conference: Southeastern Conference
- West
- Record: 19–34 (5–24 SEC)
- Head coach: Greg Goff (1st season)
- Hitting coach: Jake Wells
- Pitching coach: Terry Rooney
- Home stadium: Sewell–Thomas Stadium

2017 Southeastern Conference baseball standings
	Conf.						Overall
Team	W		L		T	PCT	W		L		T	PCT
Eastern
No. 1 Florida ^{x}‍†‍‍^{y}	21	–	9	–	0	.700	52	–	19	–	0	.732
No. 10 Kentucky ‍‍‍^{y}	19	–	11	–	0	.633	43	–	23	–	0	.652
No. 15 Vanderbilt ‍‍‍^{y}	15	–	13	–	1	.534	36	–	25	–	1	.589
Missouri ‍‍‍	14	–	16	–	0	.467	36	–	23	–	0	.610
South Carolina ‍‍‍	13	–	17	–	0	.433	35	–	25	–	0	.583
Georgia ‍‍‍	11	–	19	–	0	.367	25	–	32	–	0	.439
Tennessee ‍‍‍	7	–	21	–	0	.250	27	–	25	–	0	.519
Western
No. 2 LSU ^{x}‍†‍‡‍^{y}	21	–	9	–	0	.700	52	–	20	–	0	.722
No. 22 Arkansas ‍‍‍^{y}	18	–	11	–	0	.621	45	–	19	–	0	.703
No. 13 Mississippi State ‍‍‍^{y}	17	–	13	–	0	.567	40	–	27	–	0	.597
No. 8 Texas A&M ‍‍‍^{y}	16	–	14	–	0	.533	41	–	23	–	0	.641
No. 29 Auburn ‍‍‍^{y}	16	–	14	–	0	.533	37	–	26	–	0	.587
Ole Miss ‍‍‍	14	–	16	–	0	.467	32	–	25	–	0	.561
Alabama ‍‍‍	5	–	24	–	1	.183	19	–	34	–	1	.361
x – Division champion † – Conference champion ‡ – Tournament champion y – Invited to the NCAA tournament Rankings from Collegiate Baseball

The 2017 Alabama Crimson Tide baseball team represented the University of Alabama in the 2017 NCAA Division I baseball season. The Crimson Tide played their home games in the newly renovated Sewell–Thomas Stadium.

== Personnel ==
=== Returning starters ===
Player	Class	Position
Chandler Avant	Junior	INF
Cody Henry	Junior	INF
Cobie Vance	Sophomore	INF
Nick Eicholtz	Senior	OF
Jake Walters	Junior	SP

=== Roster ===
2017 Alabama Crimson Tide roster
Pitchers: 16 Jake Walters - Junior; 20 Brock Love - Sophomore; 21 Garret Rukes - Freshman; 24 Garrett Suchey - Junior; 25 Dylan Duarte - Sophomore; 27 Zac Rogers - Junior; 29 Nick Eicholtz - Senior; 31 Nathan Altstadt - Freshman; 33 Kyle Cameron - Sophomore; 36 Tyler McMurray - Junior; 42 Tyler Adams - Junior; 44 Davis Vainer - (redshirt) Freshman; 55 Mike Oczypok - (redshirt) Senior	Catchers: 6 Alex Webb - (redshirt) Freshman; 8 Tanner DeVinny - Senior; 28 Kyle Kaufman - Sophomore; 41 Taylor Poe - Senior; Infielders: 1 Cobie Vance - Sophomore; 2 John Trousdale - Freshman; 5 Chandler Avant - Junior; 9 Cody Henry - Junior; 11 Connor Short - Junior; 15 Camden Bauer - Freshman; 22 Hunter Alexander - Junior; 37 Zack Coker - (redshirt) Sophomore	Outfielders: 7 Chandler Taylor - Sophomore; 13 Walker McCleney - Freshman; 18 Keith Holcombe - Sophomore; 19 Hunter Webb - Senior; 46 Logan Carey - Freshman; 48 Connor Wright - (redshirt) Freshman; Utility: 3 Will Lumpkin - Freshman; 10 Sam Finnerty - Sophomore; 12 Sonny Potter - Freshman; 14 Gene Wood - Sophomore; 30 Connor Stutts - Sophomore; 32 Deacon Medders - Freshman

=== Coaching staff ===
2017 Alabama Crimson Tide baseball coaching staff
- Greg Goff – Head Coach (1st year)
- Terry Rooney – Associate head coach (1st year)
- Jake Wells – Assistant coach (1st year)
- Derek Simmons – Assistant coach (1st year)
- Michael Chadwick – Director of Operations (1st year)
- Joe Hoffer – Athletic Trainer (10th year)

== Schedule and results ==
2017 Alabama Crimson Tide baseball game log
Regular season
February (3–5)

Date	Opponent	Site/stadium	Score	Win	Loss	Save	Attendance	Overall record	SEC record
February 17	Presbyterian	Sewell–Thomas Stadium	4–3	N. Eicholtz (1–0)	B. Kehner (0–1)	B. Love (1)	4,637	1–0	–
February 18	Presbyterian	Sewell–Thomas Stadium	8–1	J. Walters (1–0)	T. Chock (0–1)	None	4,668	2–0	–
February 19	Presbyterian	Sewell–Thomas Stadium	3–4	W. Smith (1–0)	G. Suchey (0–1)	None	4,324	2–1	–
February 21	Southern Miss	Sewell–Thomas Stadium	12–5	Z. Rogers (1–0)	J. Keys (0–1)	D. Vainer (1)	3,711	3–1	–
February 24	Oral Roberts	Sewell–Thomas Stadium	3–6	G. Glaze (1–0)	S. Potter (0–1)	R. McCollough (2)	4,161	3–2	–
February 25	Oral Roberts	Sewell–Thomas Stadium	4–5	J. McMinn (0–1)	J. Walters (1–1)	K. Stout (1)	3,966	3–3	–
February 26	Oral Roberts	Sewell–Thomas Stadium	2–5	M. Asusua (1–0)	B. Love (0–1)	None	3,475	3–4	–
February 28	Jacksonville St.	Sewell–Thomas Stadium	1–2^{(10)}	J. Hoyt (1–0)	D. Vainer (0–1)	None	3,411	3–5	–

March (9–9)

Date	Opponent	Site/stadium	Score	Win	Loss	Save	Attendance	Overall record	SEC record
March 1	Louisiana–Monroe	Sewell–Thomas Stadium	4–3	B. Love (1–1)	K. Backofen (0–2)	None	5,867	4–5	–
March 3	Louisiana–Monroe	Sewell–Thomas Stadium	6–2	J. Walters (2–1)	K. Curtis (0–3)	G. Suchey (1)	4,127	5–5	–
March 4	Louisiana–Monroe	Sewell–Thomas Stadium	10–3	S. Finnerty (1–0)	C. Beal (1–1)	None	3,520	6–5	–
March 7	Troy	Sewell–Thomas Stadium	Postponed						
March 9	AR–Pine Bluff	Sewell–Thomas Stadium	6–5	G. Suchey (1–1)	T. Sanchez (0–2)	D. Vainer (2)	2,949	7–5	–
March 10	AR–Pine Bluff	Sewell–Thomas Stadium	14–1	J. Walters (3–1)	C. Lewington (0–2)	None	3,067	8–5	–
March 12	AR–Pine Bluff	Sewell–Thomas Stadium	3–8	N. Sawrie (1–2)	B. Love (1–2)	None	–	8–6	–
March 12	AR–Pine Bluff	Sewell–Thomas Stadium	12–2	D. Duarte (1–0)	T. Lopez (1–3)	None	2,866	9–6	–
March 14	Eastern Illinois	Sewell–Thomas Stadium	5–0	G. Rukes (1–0)	B. Allen (0–4)	None	2,677	10–6	–
March 15	Samford	Sewell–Thomas Stadium	10–3	C. Shelton (1–0)	S. Finnerty (1–1)	W. Burns (7)	2,953	10–7	–
March 17	#23 Missouri	Sewell–Thomas Stadium	0–3	T. Houck (3–1)	J. Walters (3–2)	T. Sikkema (2)	3,194	10–8	0–1
March 18	#23 Missouri	Sewell–Thomas Stadium	4–7	M. Plassmeyer (4–0)	D. Duarte (1–1)	None	3,428	10–9	0–2
March 19	#23 Missouri	Sewell–Thomas Stadium	5–9	C. Bartlett (3–0)	G. Rukes (1–1)	T. Sikkema (3)	3,418	10–10	0–3
March 21	vs. UAB	Regions Field	4–1	G. Rukes (2–1)	D. Munger (1–1)	D. Vainer (3)	1,152	11–10	–
March 24	at #13 South Carolina	Founders Park	4–2	J. Walters (4–2)	A. Hill (1–3)	G. Suchey (2)	6,727	12–10	1–3
March 25	at #13 South Carolina	Founders Park	5–6^{(10)}	J. Reagan (3–0)	D. Vainer (0–2)	None	8,242	12–11	1–4
March 26	at #13 South Carolina	Founders Park	2–4	J. Parke (1–1)	G. Suchey (1–2)	C. Bowers (3)	7,152	12–12	1–5
March 28^{†}	vs. #10 Auburn	Riverwalk Stadium	3–4	C. Herndon (1–0)	S. Finnerty (1–2)	A. Mitchell (1)	7,605	12–13	–
March 31	#17 Arkansas	Sewell–Thomas Stadium	1–7	B. Knight (4–1)	J. Walters (4–3)	None	4,894	12–14	1–6

April (3–15)

Date	Opponent	Site/stadium	Score	Win	Loss	Save	Attendance	Overall record	SEC record
April 1	#17 Arkansas	Sewell–Thomas Stadium	7–1	D. Duarte (2–1)	T. Stephan (4–2)	None	4,202	13–14	2–6
April 2	#17 Arkansas	Sewell–Thomas Stadium	5–8	C. Chadwick (3–0)	G. Suchey (1–3)	None	4,483	13–15	2–7
April 4	at Troy	Riddle–Pace Field	11–12	M. Skinner (2–2)	Z. Rogers (1–1)	None	3,328	13–16	–
April 5	Troy	Sewell–Thomas Stadium	Canceled						
April 7	at Ole Miss	Swayze Field	2–7	J. McArthur (2–1)	D. Duarte (2–2)	None	8,456	13–17	2–8
April 8	at Ole Miss	Swayze Field	4–5	D. Woolfolk (3–1)	G. Suchey (1–4)	None	10,247	13–18	2–9
April 9	at Ole Miss	Swayze Field	2–8	R. Rolison (4–1)	S. Finnerty (1–3)	None	7,597	13–19	2–10
April 11	UAB	Sewell–Thomas Stadium	6–4	G. Suchey (2–4)	M. Calvert (0–1)	M. Oczypok (1)	3,268	14–19	–
April 13	Texas A&M	Sewell–Thomas Stadium	5–9	C. Sherrod (4–1)	J. Walters (4–4)	None'	3,458	14–20	2–11
April 14	Texas A&M	Sewell–Thomas Stadium	2–8	C. Martin (4–2)	D. Duarte (2–3)	None	4,087	14–21	2–12
April 15	Texas A&M	Sewell–Thomas Stadium	2–3	K. Chafin (3–0)	G. Suchey (2–5)	M. Kilkenny (5)	4,477	14–22	2–13
April 18	Alcorn St.	Sewell–Thomas Stadium	18–1^{(7)}	D. Medders (1–0)	P. McMahon (0–2)	None	3,045	15–22	–
April 20	at #14 Miss. St.	Dudy Noble Field	5–6	K. Pilkington (4–3)	D. Duarte (2–4)	S. Price (14)	6,890	15–23	2–14
April 21	at #14 Miss. St.	Dudy Noble Field	3–4	P. Plumlee (5–1)	'N. Eicholtz (1–1)	R. Self (1)	–	15–24	2–15
April 22	at #14 Miss. St.	Dudy Noble Field	12–13^{(13)}	B. Blaylock (1–0)	T. Adams (0–1)	None	8,270	15–25	2–16
April 25	Jacksonville St.	Sewell–Thomas Stadium	8–11	T. Simpson (2–3)	G. Suchey (2–6)	J. Hoyt (4)	3,410	15–26	–
April 27	#14 LSU	Sewell–Thomas Stadium	2–8	A. Lange (5–4)	D. Duarte (2–5)	None	3,666	15–27	2–17
April 28	#14 LSU	Sewell–Thomas Stadium	4–7	J. Pocher (7–3)	N. Eicholtz (1–2)	H. Newman (6)	4,464	15–28	2–18
April 29	#14 LSU	Sewell–Thomas Stadium	3–4^{(11)}	H. Newman (1–1)	D. Vainer (0–3)	None	4,918	15–29	2–19

May (4–0)

Date	Opponent	Site/stadium	Score	Win	Loss	Save	Attendance	Overall record	SEC record
May 5	at #5 Auburn	Plainsman Park	4–3	J. Walters (5–4)	K. Thompson (5–3)	D. Vainer (4)	4,096	16–29	3–19
May 6	at #5 Auburn	Plainsman Park	7–6	Z. Rogers (2–1)	A. Mitchell (5–2)	D. Vainer (5)	4,013	17–29	4–19
May 7	at #5 Auburn	Plainsman Park	11–9^{(15)}	S. Potter (1–1)	R. Watson (1–1)	G. Suchey (3)	3,614	18–29	5–19
May 9	at Samford	Griffin Stadium	Canceled						
May 10	Grambling St.	Sewell–Thomas Stadium	12–2^{(8)}	D. Medders (2–0)	D Beizer (5–6)	None	2,799	19–29	–
May 12	#7 Florida	Sewell–Thomas Stadium	1–2					19–30	5–20
May 13	#7 Florida	Sewell–Thomas Stadium	6–13					19–31	5–21
May 14	#7 Florida	Sewell–Thomas Stadium	5–10					19–32	5–22
May 18	at Vanderbilt	Hawkins Field	1–18	J. Raby (9-3)	D. Medders (2-1)	None	2,904	19–33	5–23
May 19	at Vanderbilt	Hawkins Field	1–13					19–34	5–24
May 20	at Vanderbilt	Hawkins Field	3–3^{(8)}					19–34	5–24

† Indicates the game does not count toward the 2017 Southeastern Conference standings.
*Rankings are based on the team's current ranking in the Collegiate Baseball poll.

== Honors and awards ==
- None

== Record vs. conference opponents ==
Last two do not qualify for conf. tourn. Blank are not scheduled. Blue are home games, otherwise away.

2017 SEC baseball records Source: 2017 SEC baseball game results
Team	W–L	ALA	ARK	AUB	FLA	UGA	KEN	LSU	MSU	MIZZ	MISS	SCAR	TENN	TAMU	VAN	Team	Div	SR	SW
ALA	5–24		1–2	3–0	0–3	.	.	0–3	0–3	0–3	0–3	1–2	.	0–3	0–2	ALA	W7	1–9	1–6
ARK	18–11	2–1		1–2	.	3–0	.	1–2	3–0	2–1	1–2	.	1–1	2–1	2–1	ARK	W2	6–3	2–0
AUB	16–14	0–3	2–1		3–0	2–1	.	0–3	2–1	.	2–1	2–1	2–1	1–2	.	AUB	W5	7–3	1–2
FLA	21–9	3–0	.	0–3		3–0	2–1	2–1	.	3–0	3–0	2–1	1–2	.	2–1	FLA	E1	8–2	4–1
UGA	11–19	.	0–3	1–2	0–3		2–1	0–3	2–1	1–2	.	2–1	2–1	.	1–2	UGA	E6	4–6	0–3
KEN	19–11	.	.	.	1–2	1–2		2–1	1–2	2–1	2–1	2–1	3–0	3–0	2–1	KEN	E2	7–3	2–0
LSU	21–9	3–0	2–1	3–0	1–2	3–0	1–2		3–0	.	2–1	2–1	.	1–2	.	LSU	W1	7–3	4–0
MSU	17–13	3–0	0–3	1–2	.	1–2	2–1	0–3		.	3–0	2–1	3–0	2–1	.	MSU	W3	6–4	3–2
MIZZ	14–16	3–0	1–2	.	0–3	2–1	1–2	.	.		1–2	2–1	3–0	0–3	1–2	MIZZ	E4	4–6	2–2
MISS	14–16	3–0	2–1	1–2	0–3	.	1–2	1–2	0–3	2–1		.	.	2–1	2–1	MISS	W6	5–5	1–2
SCAR	13–17	2–1	.	1–2	1–2	1–2	1–2	1–2	1–2	1–2	.		3–0	.	1–2	SCAR	E5	2–8	1–0
TENN	7–21	.	1–1	1–2	2–1	1–2	0–3	.	0–3	0–3	.	0–3		1–2	1–1	TENN	E7	1–7	0–4
TAMU	16–14	3–0	1–2	2–1	.	.	0–3	2–1	1–2	3–0	1–2	.	2–1		1–2	TAMU	W4	5–5	2–1
VAN	15–13	2–0	1–2	.	1–2	2–1	1–2	.	.	2–1	1–2	2–1	1–1	2–1		VAN	E3	5–4	0–0
Team	W–L	ALA	ARK	AUB	FLA	UGA	KEN	LSU	MSU	MIZZ	MISS	SCAR	TENN	TAMU	VAN	Team	Div	SR	SW

Updated for entire regular season. Alabama and Vanderbilt had one tie game.

== Rankings ==
Ranking movements Legend: ██ Increase in ranking ██ Decrease in ranking — = Not ranked RV = Received votes
	Week																			
Poll	Pre	1	2	3	4	5	6	7	8	9	10	11	12	13	14	15	16	17	18	Final
Coaches'	—	—*	—	—	—	—	—	—	—	—	—	—	—	—	—	—	—	—	—	—
Baseball America	—	—	—	—	—	—	—	—	—	—	—	—	—	—	—	—	—	—	—	—
Collegiate Baseball^	RV	—	—	—	—	—	—	—	—	—	—	—	—	—	—	—	—	—	—	—
NCBWA†	—	14	RV	—	—	—	—	—	—	—	—	—	—	—	—	—	—	—	—	—

^ Collegiate Baseball ranked 40 teams in their preseason poll, but only ranked 30 teams weekly during the season.
† NCBWA ranks 30 teams in their preseason poll, but only ranks 25 teams weekly during the season.
* A new poll was not released for this week, so for comparison purposes, the previous week's ranking is inserted in this week's slot.

== See also ==
- 2017 Alabama Crimson Tide softball team
