= 2017 Southeastern Conference baseball tournament =

- Teams: 12
- Format: See below
- Finals site: Hoover Metropolitan Stadium; Hoover, AL
- Champions: LSU (12th title)
- Winning coach: Paul Mainieri (6th title)
- MVP: Chad Spanberger (Arkansas)
- Television: SEC Network, ESPN2

2017 Southeastern Conference baseball standings
	Conf.						Overall
Team	W		L		T	PCT	W		L		T	PCT
Eastern
No. 1 Florida ^{x}‍†‍‍^{y}	21	–	9	–	0	.700	52	–	19	–	0	.732
No. 10 Kentucky ‍‍‍^{y}	19	–	11	–	0	.633	43	–	23	–	0	.652
No. 15 Vanderbilt ‍‍‍^{y}	15	–	13	–	1	.534	36	–	25	–	1	.589
Missouri ‍‍‍	14	–	16	–	0	.467	36	–	23	–	0	.610
South Carolina ‍‍‍	13	–	17	–	0	.433	35	–	25	–	0	.583
Georgia ‍‍‍	11	–	19	–	0	.367	25	–	32	–	0	.439
Tennessee ‍‍‍	7	–	21	–	0	.250	27	–	25	–	0	.519
Western
No. 2 LSU ^{x}‍†‍‡‍^{y}	21	–	9	–	0	.700	52	–	20	–	0	.722
No. 22 Arkansas ‍‍‍^{y}	18	–	11	–	0	.621	45	–	19	–	0	.703
No. 13 Mississippi State ‍‍‍^{y}	17	–	13	–	0	.567	40	–	27	–	0	.597
No. 8 Texas A&M ‍‍‍^{y}	16	–	14	–	0	.533	41	–	23	–	0	.641
No. 29 Auburn ‍‍‍^{y}	16	–	14	–	0	.533	37	–	26	–	0	.587
Ole Miss ‍‍‍	14	–	16	–	0	.467	32	–	25	–	0	.561
Alabama ‍‍‍	5	–	24	–	1	.183	19	–	34	–	1	.361
x – Division champion † – Conference champion ‡ – Tournament champion y – Invited to the NCAA tournament Rankings from Collegiate Baseball

The 2017 Southeastern Conference baseball tournament was held from May 23 through 28 at Hoover Metropolitan Stadium in Hoover, Alabama. The annual tournament determined the tournament champion of the Division I Southeastern Conference in college baseball. The tournament champion earned the conference's automatic bid to the 2017 NCAA Division I baseball tournament After a search for potential new sites, the SEC named Hoover the host for the 2017 and future events, with a specific term to be negotiated.

The tournament has been held every year since 1977, with LSU claiming their twelfth championship against Arkansas, the most of any school. Original members Georgia and Kentucky along with 1993 addition Arkansas have never won the tournament. This is the nineteenth consecutive year and twenty-first overall that the event has been held at Hoover Metropolitan Stadium, known from 2007 through 2012 as Regions Park. Texas A&M joined in 2013, and won its first title in 2016. Missouri, which also joined in 2013, has yet to win the event.

== Format and seeding ==
The regular season division winners claimed the top two seeds and the next ten teams by conference winning percentage, regardless of division, claimed the remaining berths in the tournament. The bottom eight teams played a single-elimination opening round, followed by a double-elimination format until the semifinals, when the format reverted to single elimination through the championship game. This is the fifth year of this format.

Team	W–L–T	Pct	GB #1	Seed
Eastern Division
Florida	21–9	.700	–	1
Kentucky	19–11	.633	2	3
Vanderbilt	15–13–1	.534	5	6
Missouri	14–16	.467	7	10
South Carolina	13–17	.433	8	11
Georgia	11–19	.367	10	12
Tennessee	7–21	.250	13	–

Team	W–L–T	Pct	GB #1	Seed
Western Division
LSU	21–9	.700	–	2
Arkansas	18–11	.621	2.5	4
Mississippi State	17–13	.567	4	5
Texas A&M	16–14	.533	5	7
Auburn	16–14	.533	5	8
Ole Miss	14–16	.467	7	9
Alabama	5–24–1	.183	15.5	–

== Bracket ==
First round SECN
6	Vanderbilt	4
11	South Carolina	7^{11}
7	Texas A&M	7
10	Missouri	12
8	Auburn	5
9	Ole Miss	4
5	Mississippi State	3
12	Georgia	0

Second round SECN
3	Kentucky	7
11	South Carolina	2
2	LSU	10
10	Missouri	3
11	South Carolina	10
10	Missouri	2
1	Florida	5
8	Auburn	4
4	Arkansas	3
5	Mississippi State	4
8	Auburn	0
4	Arkansas	12^{7}

Third round SECN
3	Kentucky	0
2	LSU	10^{7}
11	South Carolina	3
3	Kentucky	1
1	Florida	12
5	Mississippi State	3
4	Arkansas	9
5	Mississippi State	2

Semifinals; SECN
2	LSU	11
11	South Carolina	0^{7}
1	Florida	0
4	Arkansas	16^{7}

Final; ESPN2
2	LSU	4
4	Arkansas	2

== Schedule ==
Game	Time*	Matchup^{#}	Television	Attendance
Tuesday, May 23
1	9:30 a.m.	No. 6 Vanderbilt vs. No. 11 South Carolina	SEC Network	
2	1:00 p.m.	No. 7 Texas A&M vs. No. 10 Missouri	SEC Network	
3	4:30 p.m.	No. 8 Auburn vs. No. 9 Ole Miss	SEC Network	2,930
Wednesday, May 24
4	9:30 a.m.	No. 5 Mississippi State vs. No. 12 Georgia	SEC Network	5,062
5	1:00 p.m.	No. 3 Kentucky vs. No. 11 South Carolina	SEC Network	5,062
6	4:30 p.m.	No. 2 LSU vs. No. 10 Missouri	SEC Network	6,890
7	8:00 p.m.	No. 1 Florida vs. No. 8 Auburn	SEC Network	6,890
Thursday, May 25
8	9:30 a.m.	No. 4 Arkansas vs. No. 5 Mississippi State	SEC Network	7,279
9	1:00 p.m.	No. 11 South Carolina vs. No. 10 Missouri	SEC Network	7,279
10	4:30 p.m.	No. 8 Auburn vs. No. 4 Arkansas	SEC Network	9,823
11	8:00 p.m.	No. 3 Kentucky vs. No. 2 LSU	SEC Network	9,823
Friday, May 26
12	11:00 a.m.	No. 1 Florida vs. No. 5 Mississippi State	SEC Network	6,988
13	3:00 p.m.	No. 11 South Carolina vs. No. 3 Kentucky	SEC Network	8,552
14	6:30 p.m.	No. 4 Arkansas vs. No. 5 Mississippi State	SEC Network	8,552
Semifinals – Saturday, May 27
15	Noon	No. 11 South Carolina vs. No. 2 LSU	SEC Network	10,793
16	3:00 p.m.	No. 4 Arkansas vs. No. 1 Florida	SEC Network	10,793
Championship – Sunday, May 28
17	2:00 p.m.	No. 2 LSU vs. No. 4 Arkansas	ESPN2	13,128
*Game times in CDT. # – Rankings denote tournament seed.
