= 2017 Arkansas Razorbacks baseball team =

American college baseball season

2017 Arkansas Razorbacks baseball
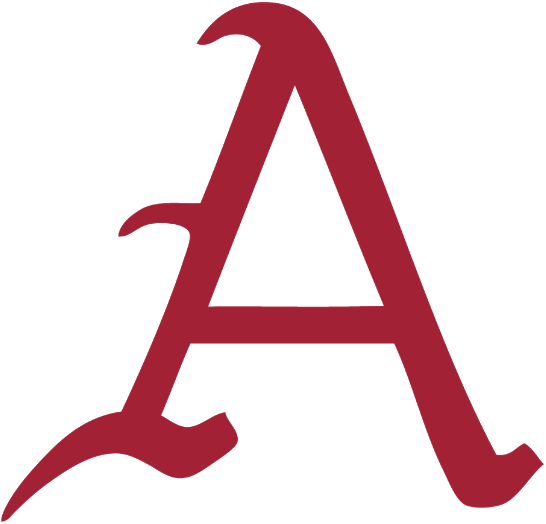

Fayetteville Regional, 3–2
- Conference: Southeastern Conference
- West

Ranking
- Coaches: No. 18
- CB: No. 19
- Record: 45–19 (18–11 SEC)
- Head coach: Dave Van Horn
- Hitting coach: Tony Vitello
- Pitching coach: Wes Johnson
- Home stadium: Baum Stadium

2017 Southeastern Conference baseball standings
	Conf.						Overall
Team	W		L		T	PCT	W		L		T	PCT
Eastern
No. 1 Florida ^{x}‍†‍‍^{y}	21	–	9	–	0	.700	52	–	19	–	0	.732
No. 10 Kentucky ‍‍‍^{y}	19	–	11	–	0	.633	43	–	23	–	0	.652
No. 15 Vanderbilt ‍‍‍^{y}	15	–	13	–	1	.534	36	–	25	–	1	.589
Missouri ‍‍‍	14	–	16	–	0	.467	36	–	23	–	0	.610
South Carolina ‍‍‍	13	–	17	–	0	.433	35	–	25	–	0	.583
Georgia ‍‍‍	11	–	19	–	0	.367	25	–	32	–	0	.439
Tennessee ‍‍‍	7	–	21	–	0	.250	27	–	25	–	0	.519
Western
No. 2 LSU ^{x}‍†‍‡‍^{y}	21	–	9	–	0	.700	52	–	20	–	0	.722
No. 22 Arkansas ‍‍‍^{y}	18	–	11	–	0	.621	45	–	19	–	0	.703
No. 13 Mississippi State ‍‍‍^{y}	17	–	13	–	0	.567	40	–	27	–	0	.597
No. 8 Texas A&M ‍‍‍^{y}	16	–	14	–	0	.533	41	–	23	–	0	.641
No. 29 Auburn ‍‍‍^{y}	16	–	14	–	0	.533	37	–	26	–	0	.587
Ole Miss ‍‍‍	14	–	16	–	0	.467	32	–	25	–	0	.561
Alabama ‍‍‍	5	–	24	–	1	.183	19	–	34	–	1	.361
x – Division champion † – Conference champion ‡ – Tournament champion y – Invited to the NCAA tournament Rankings from Collegiate Baseball

The 2017 Arkansas Razorbacks baseball team represented the University of Arkansas in baseball at the Division I level in the NCAA for the 2017 NCAA Division I baseball season. They played their home games at Baum Stadium and were coached by Dave van Horn.

== Schedule and results ==
2017 Arkansas Razorbacks baseball game log
Regular season

February
Date	Opponent	Rank	Site/stadium	Score	Win	Loss	Save	TV	Attendance	Overall record	SEC record
Feb 17	Miami (OH)*		Baum Stadium • Fayetteville, AR	**W** 7–0	**Knight** (1–0)	Gnetz (0–1)	None	SEC Network+	9,443	1–0	
Feb 18	Miami (OH)*		Baum Stadium • Fayetteville, AR	**W** 5–1	**Stephan** (1–0)	Spears (0–1)	None	SEC Network+	10,891	2–0	
Feb 19	Miami (OH)*		Baum Stadium • Fayetteville, AR	**W** 11–1	**Kopps** (1–0)	Hartwig (0–1)	None	SEC Network+	9,020	3–0	
Feb 24	Bryant*		Baum Stadium • Fayetteville, AR	**W** 11–8	**Taccolini** (1–0)	Knych (0–1)	Alberius (1)	SEC Network+	6,921	4–0	
Feb 25	Bryant*		Baum Stadium • Fayetteville, AR	**W** 13–7	**Stephan** (2–0)	Theetge (1–1)	None	SEC Network+	7,351	5–0	
Feb 26	Bryant*		Baum Stadium • Fayetteville, AR	**W** 16–6	**Taccolini** (2–0)	Morgese (0–2)	None	SEC Network+	6,529	6–0	
Feb 28	at Louisiana Tech*		J. C. Love Field at Pat Patterson Park • Ruston, LA	**L** 4–3	Ahlrich (1–0)	**Alberius** (0–1)	Harris (4)	Cox Sports Television	3,129	6–1	

March
Date	Opponent	Rank	Site/stadium	Score	Win	Loss	Save	TV	Attendance	Overall record	SEC record
Mar 1	at Louisiana Tech*		J. C. Love Field at Pat Patterson Park • Ruston, LA	**W** 13–10	**Loseke** (1–0)	Hamilton (1–1)	None	CST	2,901	7–1	
Mar 3	vs #5 Arizona*		Dr Pepper Ballpark • Frisco, TX (Frisco Classic)	**L** 3–0	Cloney (3–0)	**Knight** (1–1)	Ming (2)	CST	N/A	7–2	
Mar 4	vs Nebraska*		Dr Pepper Ballpark • Frisco, TX (Frisco Classic)	**W** 15–5	**Stephan** (3–0)	Hohensee (0–1)	None	CST	10,102	8–2	
Mar 5	vs Oklahoma State*		Dr Pepper Ballpark • Frisco, TX (Frisco Classic)	**L** 8–3	Elliott (2–0)	**Alberius** (0–2)	Cowan (1)	CST	8,120	8–3	
Mar 7	Louisiana–Monroe*		Baum Stadium • Fayetteville, AR	**W** 12–3	**Taccolini** (3–0)	Hendrix (1–1)	None	SEC Network+	6,285	9–3	
Mar 8	Louisiana–Monroe*		Baum Stadium • Fayetteville, AR	**W** 11–2	**Murphy** (1–0)	Backhofen (0–3)	None	SEC Network+	6,347	10–3	
Mar 10	Rhode Island*		Baum Stadium • Fayetteville, AR	**W** 5–2	**Loseke** (2–0)	Whitman (1–1)	None	SEC Network+	DH	11–3	
Mar 10	Rhode Island*		Baum Stadium • Fayetteville, AR	**W** 3–2	**Chadwick** (1–0)	Barss (0–1)	None	SEC Network+	7,482	12–3	
Mar 12	Rhode Island*		Baum Stadium • Fayetteville, AR	**L** 3–0	Murphy (2–1)	**Alberius** (0–3)	Barss (3)	SEC Network+	6,410	12–4	
Mar 14	Alcorn State*		Baum Stadium • Fayetteville, AR	**W** 3–2	**Chadwick** (2–0)	Acosta (0–1)	None	SEC Network+	6,143	13–4	
Mar 15	Alcorn State*		Baum Stadium • Fayetteville, AR	**W** 11–3	**Murphy** (2–0)	Belmont (1–1)	None	SEC Network+	6,211	14–4	
Mar 17	Mississippi State		Baum Stadium • Fayetteville, AR	**W** 3–1	**Knight** (2–1)	Pilkington (2–3)	Chadwick (1)	SEC Network	7,230	15–4	1–0
Mar 18	Mississippi State		Baum Stadium • Fayetteville, AR	**W** 5–4	**Stephan** (4–0)	Plumlee (2–1)	Chadwick (2)	SEC Network	8,341	16–4	2–0
Mar 19	Mississippi State		Baum Stadium • Fayetteville, AR	**W** 6–1	**Alberius** (1–3)	Mangum (1–1)	Taccolini (1)	SEC Network+	7,828	17–4	3–0
Mar 22	New Orleans*	#29	Baum Stadium • Fayetteville, AR	**W** 5–2	**Loseke** (3–0)	DeMayo (0–4)	Kopps (1)	SEC Network+	6,819	18–4	
Mar 24	at #5 Missouri	#29	Taylor Stadium • Columbia, MO	**W** 9–2	**Knight** (3–1)	Houck (3–2)	Taccolini (2)	SEC Network+	638	19–4	4–0
Mar 25	at #5 Missouri	#29	Taylor Stadium • Columbia, MO	**L** 7–2	Sikkema (5–0)	**Stephan** (4–1)	None	SEC Network+	711	19–5	4–1
Mar 26	at #5 Missouri	#29	Taylor Stadium • Columbia, MO	**W** 9–8	**Alberius** (2–3)	Toelken (1–1)	None	SEC Network+	2,229	20–5	5–1
Mar 29	Grambling		Baum Stadium • Fayetteville, AR		Cancelled						
Mar 31	at Alabama	#17	Sewell–Thomas Stadium • Tuscaloosa, AL	**W** 7–1	**Knight** (4–1)	Walters (4–3)	None	SEC Network+	4,894	21–5	6–1

April
Date	Opponent	Rank	Site/stadium	Score	Win	Loss	Save	TV	Attendance	Overall record	SEC record
Apr 1	at Alabama	#17	Sewell–Thomas Stadium • Tuscaloosa, AL	**L** 7–1	Duarte (2–1)	**Stephan** (4–2)	None	SEC Network	4,202	21–6	6–2
Apr 2	at Alabama	#17	Sewell–Thomas Stadium • Tuscaloosa, AL	**W** 8–5	**Chadwick** (3–0)	Suchey (1–3)	None	SEC Network	4,483	22–6	7–2
Apr 5	Grand Canyon*	#14	Baum Stadium • Fayetteville, AR	**W** 11–2	**Rogers** (1–0)	Benavides (0–1)	None	SEC Network+	DH	23–6	
Apr 5	Grand Canyon*	#14	Baum Stadium • Fayetteville, AR	**W** 6–1	**Murphy** (3–0)	Hansen (0–2)	None	SEC Network+	6,318	24–6	
Apr 7	#22 LSU	#14	Baum Stadium • Fayetteville, AR	**W** 9–3	**Knight** (5–1)	Lange (3–4)	None	SEC Network+	9,248	25–6	8–2
Apr 8	#22 LSU	#14	Baum Stadium • Fayetteville, AR	**L** 10–8	Beck (1–0)	**Chadwick** (3–1)	Newman (3)	SEC Network+	11,827	25–7	8–3
Apr 9	#22 LSU	#14	Baum Stadium • Fayetteville, AR	**L** 2–0	Walker (4–0)	**Alberius** (2–4)	None	SEC Network+	9,016	25–8	8–4
Apr 11	at Missouri State*	#11	Hammons Field • Springfield, MO	**W** 12–4	**Cronin** (1–0)	Witherspoon (1–3)	None	ESPN3	2,540	26–8	
Apr 13	Georgia	#11	Baum Stadium • Fayetteville, AR	**W** 14–4	**Knight** (6–1)	Brown (0–2)	None	SEC Network+	7,719	27–8	9–4
Apr 14	Georgia	#11	Baum Stadium • Fayetteville, AR	**W** 5–4 (10)	**Reindl** (1–0)	Cairnes (1–1)	None	SEC Network+	8,263	28–8	10–4
Apr 15	Georgia	#11	Baum Stadium • Fayetteville, AR	**W** 11–3	**Kopps** (2–0)	Adkins (4–4)	None	SEC Network+	9,143	29–8	11–4
Apr 18	Memphis*	#9	Baum Stadium • Fayetteville, AR	**W** 16–7	**Cronin** (2–0)	Bobo (0–1)	None	SEC Network+	6,872	30–8	
Apr 19	vs Memphis*	#9	Dickey-Stephens Park • North Little Rock, AR	**W** 2–0	**Murphy** (4–0)	Hicks (4–4)	Alberius (2)	None	8,974	31–8	
Apr 21	at #10 Auburn	#9	Samford Stadium – Hitchcock Field at Plainsman Park • Auburn, AL	**L** 15–2	Thompson (5–1)	**Knight** (6–2)	None	SEC Network+	3,472	31–9	11–5
Apr 22	at #10 Auburn	#9	Samford Stadium – Hitchcock Field at Plainsman Park • Auburn, AL	**W** 7–3	**Chadwick** (4–1)	Mitchell (4–1)	Reindl (2)	SEC Network+	3,464	32–9	12–5
Apr 23	at #10 Auburn	#9	Samford Stadium – Hitchcock Field at Plainsman Park • Auburn, AL	**L** 11–6	Mitchell (5–1)	**Chadwick** (4–2)	None	SEC Network	2,663	32–10	12–6
Apr 25	vs Kansas State*	#10	Kauffman Stadium • Kansas City, MO	**W** 6–5 (10)	**Kostyshock** (1–0)	Eckberg (0–2)	None	CST	2,988	33–10	
Apr 27	Ole Miss	#10	Baum Stadium • Fayetteville, AR	**L** 9–1	McArthur (3–3)	**Knight** (6–3)	None	SEC Network	7,419	33–11	12–7
Apr 28	Ole Miss	#10	Baum Stadium • Fayetteville, AR	**L** 4–1	Rolison (6–2)	**Stephan** (4–3)	Woolfolk (9)	SEC Network+	DH	33–12	12–8
Apr 28	Ole Miss	#10	Baum Stadium • Fayetteville, AR	**W** 7–4	**Reindl** (2–0)	Stokes (1–1)	Lee (1)	SEC Network+	8,492	34–12	13–8

May
Date	Opponent	Rank	Site/stadium	Score	Win	Loss	Save	TV	Attendance	Overall record	SEC record
May 4	at Tennessee	#17	Lindsey Nelson Stadium • Knoxville, TN	**L** 5–4	Martin (5–5)	**Reindl** (2–1)	Linginfelter (2)	SEC Network+	DH	34–13	13–9
May 6	at Tennessee	#17	Lindsey Nelson Stadium • Knoxville, TN	**W** 2–0 (7)	**Stephan** (5–3)	Stallings (3–2)	None	N/A	1,598	35–13	14–9
May 6	at Tennessee	#17	Lindsey Nelson Stadium • Knoxville, TN	Cancelled							
May 12	#25 Vanderbilt	#15	Baum Stadium • Fayetteville, AR	**W** 4–3	**Kopps** (3–0)	King (2–1)	None	SEC Network	8,151	36–13	15–9
May 13	#25 Vanderbilt	#15	Baum Stadium • Fayetteville, AR	**L** 6–2	Wright (3–5)	**Knight** (6–4)	None	SEC Network+	9,225	36–14	15–10
May 14	#25 Vanderbilt	#15	Baum Stadium • Fayetteville, AR	**W** 7–1	**Taccolini** (4–0)	Day (7–2)	Reindl (3)	SEC Network+	7,971	37–14	16–10
May 18	at Texas A&M	#15	Olsen Field at Blue Bell Park • College Station, TX	**W** 6–4 (10)	**Reindl** (3–1)	Kilkenny (3–3)	None	SEC Network+	5,396	38–14	17–10
May 19	at Texas A&M	#15	Olsen Field at Blue Bell Park • College Station, TX	**L** 5–2	Martin (6–3)	**Taccolini** (4–1)	Sherrod (3)	SEC Network+	5,110	38–15	17–11
May 20	at Texas A&M	#15	Olsen Field at Blue Bell Park • College Station, TX	**W** 8–0	**Knight** (7–4)	Kolek (3–4)	Kopps (2)	SEC Network	5,456	39–15	18–11

Postseason

SEC Tournament
Date	Opponent	Rank	Site/stadium	Score	Win	Loss	Save	Attendance	Overall record	SECT Record
May 24	#21 Mississippi State	#13	Hoover Metropolitan Stadium • Hoover, AL	**L** 4–3	Plumlee (6–1)	**Chadwick** (4–3)	Self (6)	DH	39–16	0–1
May 24	Auburn	#13	Hoover Metropolitan Stadium • Hoover, AL	**W** 12–0 (7)	**Cronin** (3–0)	Daniel (4–3)	None	DH	40–16	1–1
May 25	#21 Mississippi State	#13	Hoover Metropolitan Stadium • Hoover, AL	**W** 9–2	**Knight** (8–4)	Billingsley	None	8,552	41–16	2–1
May 26	#2 Florida	#13	Hoover Metropolitan Stadium • Hoover, AL	**W** 16–0 (7)	**Murphy** (5–0)	Singer (7–4)	None	10,793	42–16	3–1
May 27	#3 LSU	#13	Hoover Metropolitan Stadium • Hoover, AL	**L** 4–2	Walker (7–1)	**Kopps** (3–1)	Newman	13,128	42–17	3–2

NCAA Fayetteville Regional
Date	Opponent	Rank	Site/stadium	Score	Win	Loss	Save	Attendance	Overall record	Reg. Record
June 2	Oral Roberts	#13	Baum Stadium • Fayetteville, AR	**W** 3–0	**Stephan** (6–3)	Ausua (11–3)	Cronin (1)	11,088	43–17	1–0
June 3	#12 Missouri State	#13	Baum Stadium • Fayetteville, AR	**L** 5–4	Knutson (8–2)	**Knight** (8–5)	Fromson (3)	10,369	43–18	1–1
June 4	Oral Roberts	#13	Baum Stadium • Fayetteville, AR	**W** 4–3	**Alberius** (3–4)	McCutchin (1–1)	Reindl (3)	9,017	44–18	2–1
June 4	#12 Missouri State	#13	Baum Stadium • Fayetteville, AR	**W** 11–10	**Reindl** (4–1)	Knutson (8–3)	Lee (2)	9,038	45–18	3–1
June 5	#12 Missouri State	#13	Baum Stadium • Fayetteville, AR	**L** 3–2	Still (8–2)	**Murphy** (5–1)	Knutson (1)	10,527	45–19	3–2

Legend: = Win = Loss = Postponement
Bold = Arkansas team member

== Record vs. conference opponents ==
Last two do not qualify for conf. tourn. Blank are not scheduled. Blue are home games, otherwise away.

2017 SEC baseball records Source: 2017 SEC baseball game results
Team	W–L	ALA	ARK	AUB	FLA	UGA	KEN	LSU	MSU	MIZZ	MISS	SCAR	TENN	TAMU	VAN	Team	Div	SR	SW
ALA	5–24		1–2	3–0	0–3	.	.	0–3	0–3	0–3	0–3	1–2	.	0–3	0–2	ALA	W7	1–9	1–6
ARK	18–11	2–1		1–2	.	3–0	.	1–2	3–0	2–1	1–2	.	1–1	2–1	2–1	ARK	W2	6–3	2–0
AUB	16–14	0–3	2–1		3–0	2–1	.	0–3	2–1	.	2–1	2–1	2–1	1–2	.	AUB	W5	7–3	1–2
FLA	21–9	3–0	.	0–3		3–0	2–1	2–1	.	3–0	3–0	2–1	1–2	.	2–1	FLA	E1	8–2	4–1
UGA	11–19	.	0–3	1–2	0–3		2–1	0–3	2–1	1–2	.	2–1	2–1	.	1–2	UGA	E6	4–6	0–3
KEN	19–11	.	.	.	1–2	1–2		2–1	1–2	2–1	2–1	2–1	3–0	3–0	2–1	KEN	E2	7–3	2–0
LSU	21–9	3–0	2–1	3–0	1–2	3–0	1–2		3–0	.	2–1	2–1	.	1–2	.	LSU	W1	7–3	4–0
MSU	17–13	3–0	0–3	1–2	.	1–2	2–1	0–3		.	3–0	2–1	3–0	2–1	.	MSU	W3	6–4	3–2
MIZZ	14–16	3–0	1–2	.	0–3	2–1	1–2	.	.		1–2	2–1	3–0	0–3	1–2	MIZZ	E4	4–6	2–2
MISS	14–16	3–0	2–1	1–2	0–3	.	1–2	1–2	0–3	2–1		.	.	2–1	2–1	MISS	W6	5–5	1–2
SCAR	13–17	2–1	.	1–2	1–2	1–2	1–2	1–2	1–2	1–2	.		3–0	.	1–2	SCAR	E5	2–8	1–0
TENN	7–21	.	1–1	1–2	2–1	1–2	0–3	.	0–3	0–3	.	0–3		1–2	1–1	TENN	E7	1–7	0–4
TAMU	16–14	3–0	1–2	2–1	.	.	0–3	2–1	1–2	3–0	1–2	.	2–1		1–2	TAMU	W4	5–5	2–1
VAN	15–13	2–0	1–2	.	1–2	2–1	1–2	.	.	2–1	1–2	2–1	1–1	2–1		VAN	E3	5–4	0–0
Team	W–L	ALA	ARK	AUB	FLA	UGA	KEN	LSU	MSU	MIZZ	MISS	SCAR	TENN	TAMU	VAN	Team	Div	SR	SW

Updated for entire regular season. Alabama and Vanderbilt had one tie game.

== Rankings ==
Ranking movements Legend: ██ Increase in ranking ██ Decrease in ranking — = Not ranked RV = Received votes
	Week																			
Poll	Pre	1	2	3	4	5	6	7	8	9	10	11	12	13	14	15	16	17	18	Final
Coaches'	RV	RV*	RV*	RV	RV	RV	20	20	15	14	15	15	16	16	13	12	12*			
Baseball America	—	—	—	—	—	—	21	16	19	16	16	18	18	16	13	11	11*			
Collegiate Baseball^	—	—	—	—	—	29	17	14	11	9	10	17	15	15	13	13	22			
NCBWA†	RV	RV	20	30	RV	28	20	15	13	10	12	14	17	16	12	11	22			

^ Collegiate Baseball ranked 40 teams in their preseason poll, but only ranked 30 teams weekly during the season.
† NCBWA ranks 30 teams in their preseason poll, but only ranks 25 teams weekly during the season.
* A new poll was not released for this week, so for comparison purposes, the previous week's ranking is inserted in this week's slot.
