= 2017 South Carolina Gamecocks baseball team =

American college baseball season

2017 South Carolina Gamecocks baseball
- Conference: Southeastern Conference
- Record: 35–25 (13–17 SEC)
- Head coach: Chad Holbrook (5th season)
- Assistant coaches: Sammy Esposito (10th season); Brian Buscher (6th/7th season)
- Pitching coach: Jerry Meyers (7th/15th season)
- Home stadium: Founders Park

2017 Southeastern Conference baseball standings
	Conf.						Overall
Team	W		L		T	PCT	W		L		T	PCT
Eastern
No. 1 Florida ^{x}‍†‍‍^{y}	21	–	9	–	0	.700	52	–	19	–	0	.732
No. 10 Kentucky ‍‍‍^{y}	19	–	11	–	0	.633	43	–	23	–	0	.652
No. 15 Vanderbilt ‍‍‍^{y}	15	–	13	–	1	.534	36	–	25	–	1	.589
Missouri ‍‍‍	14	–	16	–	0	.467	36	–	23	–	0	.610
South Carolina ‍‍‍	13	–	17	–	0	.433	35	–	25	–	0	.583
Georgia ‍‍‍	11	–	19	–	0	.367	25	–	32	–	0	.439
Tennessee ‍‍‍	7	–	21	–	0	.250	27	–	25	–	0	.519
Western
No. 2 LSU ^{x}‍†‍‡‍^{y}	21	–	9	–	0	.700	52	–	20	–	0	.722
No. 22 Arkansas ‍‍‍^{y}	18	–	11	–	0	.621	45	–	19	–	0	.703
No. 13 Mississippi State ‍‍‍^{y}	17	–	13	–	0	.567	40	–	27	–	0	.597
No. 8 Texas A&M ‍‍‍^{y}	16	–	14	–	0	.533	41	–	23	–	0	.641
No. 29 Auburn ‍‍‍^{y}	16	–	14	–	0	.533	37	–	26	–	0	.587
Ole Miss ‍‍‍	14	–	16	–	0	.467	32	–	25	–	0	.561
Alabama ‍‍‍	5	–	24	–	1	.183	19	–	34	–	1	.361
x – Division champion † – Conference champion ‡ – Tournament champion y – Invited to the NCAA tournament Rankings from Collegiate Baseball

The 2017 South Carolina Gamecocks baseball team represented the University of South Carolina in the 2017 NCAA Division I baseball season. The Gamecocks played their home games at Founders Park. The team was led by 5th year head coach Chad Holbrook.

== Record vs. conference opponents ==
Last two do not qualify for conf. tourn. Blank are not scheduled. Blue are home games, otherwise away.

2017 SEC baseball records Source: 2017 SEC baseball game results
Team	W–L	ALA	ARK	AUB	FLA	UGA	KEN	LSU	MSU	MIZZ	MISS	SCAR	TENN	TAMU	VAN	Team	Div	SR	SW
ALA	5–24		1–2	3–0	0–3	.	.	0–3	0–3	0–3	0–3	1–2	.	0–3	0–2	ALA	W7	1–9	1–6
ARK	18–11	2–1		1–2	.	3–0	.	1–2	3–0	2–1	1–2	.	1–1	2–1	2–1	ARK	W2	6–3	2–0
AUB	16–14	0–3	2–1		3–0	2–1	.	0–3	2–1	.	2–1	2–1	2–1	1–2	.	AUB	W5	7–3	1–2
FLA	21–9	3–0	.	0–3		3–0	2–1	2–1	.	3–0	3–0	2–1	1–2	.	2–1	FLA	E1	8–2	4–1
UGA	11–19	.	0–3	1–2	0–3		2–1	0–3	2–1	1–2	.	2–1	2–1	.	1–2	UGA	E6	4–6	0–3
KEN	19–11	.	.	.	1–2	1–2		2–1	1–2	2–1	2–1	2–1	3–0	3–0	2–1	KEN	E2	7–3	2–0
LSU	21–9	3–0	2–1	3–0	1–2	3–0	1–2		3–0	.	2–1	2–1	.	1–2	.	LSU	W1	7–3	4–0
MSU	17–13	3–0	0–3	1–2	.	1–2	2–1	0–3		.	3–0	2–1	3–0	2–1	.	MSU	W3	6–4	3–2
MIZZ	14–16	3–0	1–2	.	0–3	2–1	1–2	.	.		1–2	2–1	3–0	0–3	1–2	MIZZ	E4	4–6	2–2
MISS	14–16	3–0	2–1	1–2	0–3	.	1–2	1–2	0–3	2–1		.	.	2–1	2–1	MISS	W6	5–5	1–2
SCAR	13–17	2–1	.	1–2	1–2	1–2	1–2	1–2	1–2	1–2	.		3–0	.	1–2	SCAR	E5	2–8	1–0
TENN	7–21	.	1–1	1–2	2–1	1–2	0–3	.	0–3	0–3	.	0–3		1–2	1–1	TENN	E7	1–7	0–4
TAMU	16–14	3–0	1–2	2–1	.	.	0–3	2–1	1–2	3–0	1–2	.	2–1		1–2	TAMU	W4	5–5	2–1
VAN	15–13	2–0	1–2	.	1–2	2–1	1–2	.	.	2–1	1–2	2–1	1–1	2–1		VAN	E3	5–4	0–0
Team	W–L	ALA	ARK	AUB	FLA	UGA	KEN	LSU	MSU	MIZZ	MISS	SCAR	TENN	TAMU	VAN	Team	Div	SR	SW

Updated for entire regular season. Alabama and Vanderbilt had one tie game.
