= 2017 Tennessee Volunteers baseball team =

American college baseball season

2017 Tennessee Volunteers baseball
- Conference: Southeastern Conference
- Record: 27–25 (7–21 SEC)
- Head coach: Dave Serrano (6th season)
- Home stadium: Lindsey Nelson Stadium

2017 Southeastern Conference baseball standings
	Conf.						Overall
Team	W		L		T	PCT	W		L		T	PCT
Eastern
No. 1 Florida ^{x}‍†‍‍^{y}	21	–	9	–	0	.700	52	–	19	–	0	.732
No. 10 Kentucky ‍‍‍^{y}	19	–	11	–	0	.633	43	–	23	–	0	.652
No. 15 Vanderbilt ‍‍‍^{y}	15	–	13	–	1	.534	36	–	25	–	1	.589
Missouri ‍‍‍	14	–	16	–	0	.467	36	–	23	–	0	.610
South Carolina ‍‍‍	13	–	17	–	0	.433	35	–	25	–	0	.583
Georgia ‍‍‍	11	–	19	–	0	.367	25	–	32	–	0	.439
Tennessee ‍‍‍	7	–	21	–	0	.250	27	–	25	–	0	.519
Western
No. 2 LSU ^{x}‍†‍‡‍^{y}	21	–	9	–	0	.700	52	–	20	–	0	.722
No. 22 Arkansas ‍‍‍^{y}	18	–	11	–	0	.621	45	–	19	–	0	.703
No. 13 Mississippi State ‍‍‍^{y}	17	–	13	–	0	.567	40	–	27	–	0	.597
No. 8 Texas A&M ‍‍‍^{y}	16	–	14	–	0	.533	41	–	23	–	0	.641
No. 29 Auburn ‍‍‍^{y}	16	–	14	–	0	.533	37	–	26	–	0	.587
Ole Miss ‍‍‍	14	–	16	–	0	.467	32	–	25	–	0	.561
Alabama ‍‍‍	5	–	24	–	1	.183	19	–	34	–	1	.361
x – Division champion † – Conference champion ‡ – Tournament champion y – Invited to the NCAA tournament Rankings from Collegiate Baseball

The 2017 Tennessee Volunteers baseball team represented the University of Tennessee in the 2017 NCAA Division I baseball season. The Volunteers played their home games at Lindsey Nelson Stadium. The team was coached by Dave Serrano in his sixth season as head coach at Tennessee. Three games prior to the end of the season, Serrano announced that he will resign at its conclusion.

== Roster ==
2017 Tennessee Volunteers active roster
Pitchers: 11 – RHP – Kyle Serrano – (redshirt) Junior – Knoxville, TN; 12 – RHP – Hunter Martin – Senior – Murfreesboro, TN; 15 – RHP – Will Neely – Sophomore – Knoxville, TN; 16 – RHP – Jacob Westphal – (redshirt) Sophomore – Sioux City, IA; 17 – RHP – Connor Darling – Freshman – Suwanee, GA; 23 – LHP – Zach Warren – Junior – Vineland, NJ; 24 – LHP – Alex Harper-Cook – Sophomore – Maryville, TN; 25 – RHP – Zach Linginfelter – Freshman – Sevierville, TN; 27 – RHP – Garrett Stallings – Freshman – Chesapeake, VA; 28 – RHP – Jon Lipinski – Senior – Coral Springs, FL; 29 – RHP – Daniel Vasquez – Sophomore – El Cajon, CA; 30 – RHP – Andrew Schultz – Freshman – Alpharetta, GA; 34 – RHP – Quint Robinson – (redshirt) Junior – Nashville, TN; 36 – LHP – Will Heflin – Freshman – Morristown, TN; 37 – RHP – Richard Jackson – (redshirt) Sophomore – Atlanta, GA; 41 – RHP – Eric Freeman – (redshirt) Junior – Knoxville, TN; 46 – LHP – Redmond Walsh – Freshman – Louisville, TN	Catchers: 14 – Pete Derkay – Freshman – Acworth, GA; 31 – Benito Santiago – Junior – Pembroke Pines, FL; 32 – Danny Sirven – (redshirt) Sophomore – Miami, FL; 35 – Nico Mascia – (redshirt) Freshman – Knoxville, TN; Infielders: 2 – Alex Sosnowski – Freshman – Orange, CA; 4 – Jay Charleston – Freshman – Longwood, FL; 5 – Reggie Southall – (redshirt) Senior – Inglewood, CA; 6 – Jeff Moberg – (redshirt) Senior – Murrieta, CA; 7 – Jordan Rodgers – Senior – Bartlett, TN; 8 – Brandon Chinea – Freshman – Miami, FL; 13 – Andre Lipcius – Freshman – Williamsburg, VA; 19 – Max Bartlett – Senior – Starkville, MS; Outfielders: 1 – Brodie Leftridge – Junior – Baltimore, MD; 9 – Justin Ammons – Freshman – Memphis, TN; 21 – Cal Gobbell – Freshman – Savannah, TN; 22 – Matt Waldren – Senior – Phoenix, AZ; 26 – Dom Thornton – Junior – Houston, TX; 40 – Luc Lipcius – Freshman – Williamsburg, VA	Coaches: Dave Serrano – Head Coach (6th year); Larry Simcox – Assistant Coach; Aric Thomas – Assistant Coach/Recruiting Coordinator; Todd Helton – Director of Player Development

== Schedule and results ==
2017 Tennessee Volunteers baseball game log
Regular season

February
Date	Opponent	Site/stadium	Score	Win	Loss	Save	TV	Attendance	Overall record	SEC record
Feb; 17	at Memphis*	FedExPark • Memphis, TN	8–5	**Martin** (1–0)	Walton (0–1)	None		1,117	1–0	–
Feb; 18	at Memphis*	FedExPark • Memphis, TN	1–4	Crosby (1–0)	**Warren** (0–1)	Bowlan (1)		1,489	1–1	–
Feb; 19	at Memphis*	FedExPark • Memphis, TN	10–0	**Neely** (1–0)	Alexander (0–1)	None		2,188	2–1	–
Feb; 22	at Loyola Marymount*	George C. Page Stadium • Los Angeles, CA	8–4	**Vasquez** (1–0)	Skolarz (0–1)	None		262	3–1	–
Feb; 24	vs. Seton Hall*	Tony Gwynn Stadium • San Diego, CA (Tony Gwynn Classic)	12–5	**Martin** (2–0)	McCarthy (0–1)	None		242	4–1	–
	vs. San Diego State*	Tony Gwynn Stadium • San Diego, CA (Tony Gwynn Classic)	8–4	**Lipinski** (1–0)	Erickson (0–1)	None		622	5–1	–
Feb; 25	vs. UC Irvine*	Fowler Park • San Diego, CA (Tony Gwynn Classic)	10–9	**Stallings** (1–0)	Bocko (0–1)	None			6–1	–

March
Date	Opponent	Site/stadium	Score	Win	Loss	Save	TV	Attendance	Overall record	SEC record
Mar; 3	Norfolk State*	Lindsey Nelson Stadium • Knoxville, TN	10–2	**Martin** (3–0)	Mauricio (1–2)	None		1,442	7–1	–
Mar; 4	Norfolk State*	Lindsey Nelson Stadium • Knoxville, TN	5–2	**Warren** (1–1)	Hemmerich (1–2)	**Lipinski** (1)		2,028	8–1	–
Mar; 5	Norfolk State*	Lindsey Nelson Stadium • Knoxville, TN	5–4^{11}	**Lipinski** (2–0)	Parmentier (0–1)	None	SECN+	2,037	9–1	–
Mar; 7	at East Tennessee State*	Thomas Stadium • Johnson City, TN	–						–	–
Mar; 10	Cincinnati*	Lindsey Nelson Stadium • Knoxville, TN	1–2	Zellner (1–1)	**Martin** (3–1)	Orndorff (1)		1,384	9–2	–
Mar; 11	Cincinnati*	Lindsey Nelson Stadium • Knoxville, TN	2–1	**Stallings** (1–0)	Perez (0–3)	None		1,144	10–2	–
	Cincinnati*	Lindsey Nelson Stadium • Knoxville, TN	6–2	**Warren** (2–1)	Colvin (0–1)	None		1,144	11–2	–
Mar; 14	at Middle Tennessee State*	Reese Smith Jr. Field • Murfreesboro, TN	–						–	–
Mar; 15	Austin Peay*	Lindsey Nelson Stadium • Knoxville, TN	18–4	**Vasquez** (2–0)	Neff (0–1)	None		974	12–2	–
Mar; 17	South Carolina	Lindsey Nelson Stadium • Knoxville, TN	1–7	Hill (1–2)	**Martin** (3–2)	None	SECN	1,457	12–3	0–1
Mar; 18	South Carolina	Lindsey Nelson Stadium • Knoxville, TN	4–6^{10}	Reagan (2–0)	**Linginfelter** (0–1)	None	SECN+	2,427	12–4	0–2
Mar; 19	South Carolina	Lindsey Nelson Stadium • Knoxville, TN	2–10	Lee (1–0)	**Neely** (1–1)	None	ESPNU	1,818	12–5	0–3
Mar; 21	Marshall*	Lindsey Nelson Stadium • Knoxville, TN	7–1	**Darling** (1–0)	O'Connor (1–1)	None		1,461	13–5	–
Mar; 24	at Mississippi State	Dudy Noble Field • Starkville, MS	4–5	Barton (1–0)	**Serrano** (0–1)	Price (5)		7,744	13–6	0–4
Mar; 25	at Mississippi State	Dudy Noble Field • Starkville, MS	4–14	Plumlee (3–1)	**Linginfelter** (0–2)	None		6,335	13–7	0–5
Mar; 26	at Mississippi State	Dudy Noble Field • Starkville, MS	4–7	Self (3–0)	**Warren** (2–2)	Price (6)		7,395	13–8	0–6
Mar; 28	Tennessee Tech*	Lindsey Nelson Stadium • Knoxville, TN	6–0	**Linginfelter** (1–2)	Lancaster (3–1)	None		1,495	14–8	–
Mar; 31	Georgia	Lindsey Nelson Stadium • Knoxville, TN	6–5	**Martin** (4–2)	Gist (1–2)	**Warren** (1)	SECN+	1,916	15–8	1–6

April
Date	Opponent	Site/stadium	Score	Win	Loss	Save	TV	Attendance	Overall record	SEC record
Apr; 1	Georgia	Lindsey Nelson Stadium • Knoxville, TN	5–7	Kristofak (1–1)	**Vasquez** (2–1)	Cairnes (2)	SECN+	2,671	15–9	1–7
Apr; 2	Georgia	Lindsey Nelson Stadium • Knoxville, TN	1–3	Adkins (4–2)	**Linginfelter** (1–3)	Cairnes (3)	SECN+	2,967	15–10	1–8
Apr; 4	Middle Tennessee State*	Lindsey Nelson Stadium • Knoxville, TN	4–7	Small (2–0)	**Warren** (2–3)	Huff (2)		1,741	15–11	–
Apr; 7	at Florida	Alfred A. McKethan Stadium • Gainesville, FL	7–6^{10}	**Linginfelter** (2–3)	Byrne (1–3)	**Lipinski** (2)	SECN+	3,894	16–11	2–8
Apr; 8	at Florida	Alfred A. McKethan Stadium • Gainesville, FL	3–2^{10}	**Lipinski** (3–0)	Byrne (1–4)	None	SECN+	5,776	17–11	3–8
Apr; 9	at Florida	Alfred A. McKethan Stadium • Gainesville, FL	4–5	Kowar (5–0)	**Linginfelter** (2–4)	Byrne (5)	SECN	3,894	17–12	3–9
Apr; 11	East Tennessee State*	Lindsey Nelson Stadium • Knoxville, TN	2–10	McCann (3–0)	**Serrano** (0–2)	None		1,911	17–13	–
Apr; 13	Auburn	Lindsey Nelson Stadium • Knoxville, TN	2–3	Mize (6–1)	**Martin** (4–3)	Mitchell (2)	SECN	1,876	17–14	3–10
Apr; 14	Auburn	Lindsey Nelson Stadium • Knoxville, TN	5–4^{10}	**Lipinski** (4–0)	Herndon (1–1)	None	SECN+	2,418	18–14	4–10
Apr; 15	Auburn	Lindsey Nelson Stadium • Knoxville, TN	1–8	Daniel (3–2)	**Warren** (2–4)	None		2,298	18–15	4–11
Apr; 19	UNC Asheville*	Lindsey Nelson Stadium • Knoxville, TN	5–2	**Freeman** (1–0)	Boyles (0–5)	None		1,205	19–15	–
Apr; 21	at Texas A&M	Olsen Field at Blue Bell Park • College Station, TX	1–2	Kilkenny (3–1)	**Martin** (4–4)	None		4,226	19–16	4–12
Apr; 22	at Texas A&M	Olsen Field at Blue Bell Park • College Station, TX	1–3	Martin (5–2)	**Stallings** (2–1)	Kilkenny (6)		6,022	19–17	4–13
Apr; 23	at Texas A&M	Olsen Field at Blue Bell Park • College Station, TX	5–3^{14}	**Linginfelter** (3–4)	Doxakis (2–2)	**Schultz** (1)		4,837	20–17	5–13
Apr; 26	vs. East Tennessee State*	Smokies Park • Kodak, TN	8–1	**Neely** (2–1)	Krieg (1–4)	None		3,351	21–17	–
Apr; 28	at Vanderbilt	Hawkins Field • Nashville, TN	0–1	Raby (7–3)	**Martin** (4–5)	Hayes (6)		3,499	21–18	5–14
Apr; 29	at Vanderbilt	Hawkins Field • Nashville, TN	9–3	**Stallings** (3–1)	Wright (2–5)	**Linginfelter** (1)	SECN	3,603	22–18	6–14
Apr; 30	at Vanderbilt	Hawkins Field • Nashville, TN	–				SECN		–	–

May
Date	Opponent	Site/stadium	Score	Win	Loss	Save	TV	Attendance	Overall record	SEC record
May; 2	East Tennessee State*	Lindsey Nelson Stadium • Knoxville, TN	9–2	**Neely** (3–1)	Gentry (0–1)	None		1,646	23–18	–
May; 6	Arkansas	Lindsey Nelson Stadium • Knoxville, TN	5–4	**Martin** (5–5)	Reindl (2–1)	**Linginfelter** (2)	SECN	1,598	24–18	7–14
	Arkansas	Lindsey Nelson Stadium • Knoxville, TN	0–2	Stephan (5–3)	**Stallings** (3–2)	None	SECN+	1,598	24–19	7–15
	Arkansas	Lindsey Nelson Stadium • Knoxville, TN	–				SECN		–	–
May; 9	Belmont*	Lindsey Nelson Stadium • Knoxville, TN	14–8	**Lipinski** (5–0)	Lovell (0–3)	None		1,461	25–19	–
May; 10	at Eastern Kentucky*	Turkey Hughes Field • Richmond, KY	7–6	**Schultz** (1–0)	Ford (1–3)	**Linginfelter** (3)		550	26–19	–
May; 12	at Kentucky	Cliff Hagan Stadium • Lexington, KY	5–15	Hjelle (8–2)	**Martin** (5–6)	None		2,368	26–20	7–16
May; 13	at Kentucky	Cliff Hagan Stadium • Lexington, KY	3–8	Machamer (1–0)	**Stallings** (3–3)	None		3,793	26–21	7–17
May; 14	at Kentucky	Cliff Hagan Stadium • Lexington, KY	2–7	Thompson (7–2)	**Warren** (2–5)	Salow (10)		3,085	26–22	7–18
May; 16	Morehead State*	Lindsey Nelson Stadium • Knoxville, TN	4–3^{11}	**Lipinski** (6–0)	Humphreys (2–4)	None		1,390	27–22	–
May; 18	Missouri	Lindsey Nelson Stadium • Knoxville, TN	0–5	Sikkema (8-1)	**Martin** (5-7)	None		1,033	27–23	7–19
May; 19	Missouri	Lindsey Nelson Stadium • Knoxville, TN	0–2	Bartlett (6–2)	**Stallings** (3–4)	None		1,703	27–24	7–20
May; 20	Missouri	Lindsey Nelson Stadium • Knoxville, TN	2–8	Montes (4–5)	**Lipinski** (6–1)	None		2,003	27–25	7–21

Legend: = Win = Loss = Postponed
Bold = Tennessee team member

== Record vs. conference opponents ==
Last two do not qualify for conf. tourn. Blank are not scheduled. Blue are home games, otherwise away.

2017 SEC baseball records Source: 2017 SEC baseball game results
Team	W–L	ALA	ARK	AUB	FLA	UGA	KEN	LSU	MSU	MIZZ	MISS	SCAR	TENN	TAMU	VAN	Team	Div	SR	SW
ALA	5–24		1–2	3–0	0–3	.	.	0–3	0–3	0–3	0–3	1–2	.	0–3	0–2	ALA	W7	1–9	1–6
ARK	18–11	2–1		1–2	.	3–0	.	1–2	3–0	2–1	1–2	.	1–1	2–1	2–1	ARK	W2	6–3	2–0
AUB	16–14	0–3	2–1		3–0	2–1	.	0–3	2–1	.	2–1	2–1	2–1	1–2	.	AUB	W5	7–3	1–2
FLA	21–9	3–0	.	0–3		3–0	2–1	2–1	.	3–0	3–0	2–1	1–2	.	2–1	FLA	E1	8–2	4–1
UGA	11–19	.	0–3	1–2	0–3		2–1	0–3	2–1	1–2	.	2–1	2–1	.	1–2	UGA	E6	4–6	0–3
KEN	19–11	.	.	.	1–2	1–2		2–1	1–2	2–1	2–1	2–1	3–0	3–0	2–1	KEN	E2	7–3	2–0
LSU	21–9	3–0	2–1	3–0	1–2	3–0	1–2		3–0	.	2–1	2–1	.	1–2	.	LSU	W1	7–3	4–0
MSU	17–13	3–0	0–3	1–2	.	1–2	2–1	0–3		.	3–0	2–1	3–0	2–1	.	MSU	W3	6–4	3–2
MIZZ	14–16	3–0	1–2	.	0–3	2–1	1–2	.	.		1–2	2–1	3–0	0–3	1–2	MIZZ	E4	4–6	2–2
MISS	14–16	3–0	2–1	1–2	0–3	.	1–2	1–2	0–3	2–1		.	.	2–1	2–1	MISS	W6	5–5	1–2
SCAR	13–17	2–1	.	1–2	1–2	1–2	1–2	1–2	1–2	1–2	.		3–0	.	1–2	SCAR	E5	2–8	1–0
TENN	7–21	.	1–1	1–2	2–1	1–2	0–3	.	0–3	0–3	.	0–3		1–2	1–1	TENN	E7	1–7	0–4
TAMU	16–14	3–0	1–2	2–1	.	.	0–3	2–1	1–2	3–0	1–2	.	2–1		1–2	TAMU	W4	5–5	2–1
VAN	15–13	2–0	1–2	.	1–2	2–1	1–2	.	.	2–1	1–2	2–1	1–1	2–1		VAN	E3	5–4	0–0
Team	W–L	ALA	ARK	AUB	FLA	UGA	KEN	LSU	MSU	MIZZ	MISS	SCAR	TENN	TAMU	VAN	Team	Div	SR	SW

Updated for entire regular season. Alabama and Vanderbilt had one tie game.
