= 2017 Vanderbilt Commodores baseball team =

American college baseball season

2017 Vanderbilt Commodores baseball

Clemson Regional champions
- Conference: Southeastern Conference

Ranking
- Coaches: No. 16
- CB: No. 18
- Record: 36–25–1 (15–13–1 SEC)
- Head coach: Tim Corbin (15th season)
- Assistant coach: Scott Brown (5th season)
- Hitting coach: D.J. Svihlik (1st season)
- Home stadium: Hawkins Field

2017 Southeastern Conference baseball standings
	Conf.						Overall
Team	W		L		T	PCT	W		L		T	PCT
Eastern
No. 1 Florida ^{x}‍†‍‍^{y}	21	–	9	–	0	.700	52	–	19	–	0	.732
No. 10 Kentucky ‍‍‍^{y}	19	–	11	–	0	.633	43	–	23	–	0	.652
No. 15 Vanderbilt ‍‍‍^{y}	15	–	13	–	1	.534	36	–	25	–	1	.589
Missouri ‍‍‍	14	–	16	–	0	.467	36	–	23	–	0	.610
South Carolina ‍‍‍	13	–	17	–	0	.433	35	–	25	–	0	.583
Georgia ‍‍‍	11	–	19	–	0	.367	25	–	32	–	0	.439
Tennessee ‍‍‍	7	–	21	–	0	.250	27	–	25	–	0	.519
Western
No. 2 LSU ^{x}‍†‍‡‍^{y}	21	–	9	–	0	.700	52	–	20	–	0	.722
No. 22 Arkansas ‍‍‍^{y}	18	–	11	–	0	.621	45	–	19	–	0	.703
No. 13 Mississippi State ‍‍‍^{y}	17	–	13	–	0	.567	40	–	27	–	0	.597
No. 8 Texas A&M ‍‍‍^{y}	16	–	14	–	0	.533	41	–	23	–	0	.641
No. 29 Auburn ‍‍‍^{y}	16	–	14	–	0	.533	37	–	26	–	0	.587
Ole Miss ‍‍‍	14	–	16	–	0	.467	32	–	25	–	0	.561
Alabama ‍‍‍	5	–	24	–	1	.183	19	–	34	–	1	.361
x – Division champion † – Conference champion ‡ – Tournament champion y – Invited to the NCAA tournament Rankings from Collegiate Baseball

The 2017 Vanderbilt Commodores baseball team represented Vanderbilt University during the 2017 NCAA Division I baseball season. The Commodores played their home games at Hawkins Field as a member of the Eastern Division of the Southeastern Conference. They are led by head coach Tim Corbin, in his 15th season at Vanderbilt. The Commodores would finish the regular season 33–21–1 overall, 15–13–1 in conference play and be invited to the 2017 NCAA Division I baseball tournament. Vanderbilt would beat Clemson to win the Clemson Regional, before losing to #1 Oregon State in the Corvallis Super Regional.

== Previous season ==
The Commodores had a hot start to the 2016 season, being ranked as high as #2 before compiling a 40–15 regular season record, going 18–12 in the SEC. The Commodores finished ranked #10 in the nation and earned a #6 seed in the 2016 Southeastern Conference tournament. The Commodores went 2–2 and were eliminated by Texas A&M, the eventual champions. Following the SEC tournament, the Commodores hosted a regional in the NCAA Division I baseball tournament, part of the Louisville super regional. The season was marred by the death of freshman pitcher Donny Everett, who drowned the day before Vanderbilt was to take on Xavier University in their first regional game. Vanderbilt went 0–2 in the Nashville regional to end the season, falling to Xavier and Washington.

== Personnel ==
=== Roster ===
2016 Vanderbilt Commodores roster
Pitchers: 6 – Justin Wilson – Sophomore; 11 – Paxton Stover – Junior; 16 – Penn Murfee – (redshirt) Junior; 24 – Reed Hayes – Junior; 25 – Michael Sandborn – Freshman; 27 – Chandler Day – Sophomore; 28 – Matt Ruppenthal – Junior; 29 – Patrick Raby – Sophomore; 34 – Zach King – Freshman; 35 – Jackson Gillis – Freshman; 38 – Matt McGarry – Sophomore; 40 – Collin Snider – Junior; 42 – Maddux Conger – Sophomore; 44 – Kyle Wright – Junior; 45 – Reid Schaller – Freshman; 49 – A.J. Franklin – (redshirt) Freshman; 66 – Drake Fellows – Freshman	Catchers: 5 – Jason Delay – Senior; 19 – Stephen Scott – Sophomore; 20 – Ty Duvall – Freshman; Infielders: 2 – Harrison Ray – Freshman; 8 – Alonzo Jones – Sophomore; 9 – Will Toffey – Junior; 10 – Ethan Paul – Sophomore; 12 – Connor Kaiser – Sophomore; 21 – Alex Brewer – Freshman; 22 – Julian Infante – Sophomore	Outfielders: 1 – Ro Coleman – Senior; 3 – Jeren Kendall – Junior; 13 – Kiambu Fentress – (redshirt) Freshman; 17 – Walker Grisanti – Sophomore; 19 – Stephen Scott – Sophomore; 24- Reed Hayes – Junior; 51 – J.J. Bleday – Freshman

=== Coaching staff ===
Name	Position	Seasons at Vanderbilt	Alma mater
Tim Corbin	Head coach	15	Ohio Wesleyan University (1984)
Scott Brown	Assistant coach	5	SUNY Cortland (1999)
D.J. Svihlik	Hitting Coach/Recruiting Coordinator	1	Illinois (2000)

== Schedule ==
Legend
	Vanderbilt win
	Vanderbilt loss
	Postponement
**Bold**	Vanderbilt team member

2017 Vanderbilt Commodores Game Log
Regular season

February
Date	Opponent	Rank	Site/stadium	Score	Win	Loss	Save	Attendance	Overall record	SEC record
February 16	at San Diego	#7	Fowler Park • San Diego, CA	2–3	Sprengel (1–0)	**Wright** (0–1)	Conyers (1)	902	0–1	
February 17	at San Diego	#7	Fowler Park • San Diego, CA	8–2	**Raby** (1–0)	Teaney (0–1)	**Snider** (1)	540	1–1	
February 19	at San Diego	#7	Fowler Park • San Diego, CA	11–1	**Fellows** (1–0)	Burdick (0–1)	—	985	2–1	
February 22	vs. Evansville	#7	Hawkins Field • Nashville, TN	7–4	**Conger** (1–0)	Weigand (0–1)	**Ruppenthal** (1)	2,550	3–1	
February 24	vs. UIC	#7	Hawkins Field • Nashville, TN	3–5 (10)	Ryan (1–1)	**Snider** (0–1)	—	2,710	3–2	
February 25	vs. UIC	#7	Hawkins Field • Nashville, TN	6–2	**Raby** (2–0)	Andersen (0–1)	**Hayes** (1)	2,648	4–2	
February 26	vs. UIC	#7	Hawkins Field • Nashville, TN	2–5 (11)	Padilla (1–0)	**Ruppenthal** (0–1)	Ryan (1)	2,668	4–3	
February 28	vs. Southeastern Louisiana	#17	Hawkins Field • Nashville, TN	9–6	**Snider** (1–1)	Tassin (1–1)	**Hayes** (2)	2,489	5–3	

March
Date	Opponent	Rank	Site/stadium	Score	Win	Loss	Save	Attendance	Overall record	SEC record
March 1	vs. Southeastern Louisiana	#17	Hawkins Field • Nashville, TN	4–2	**Stover** (1–0)	Koestler (0–1)	**Hayes** (3)	2,493	6–3	
March 3	vs. Cal State Northridge	#17	Hawkins Field • Nashville, TN	4–6	Weston (2–1)	**Wright** (0–2)	O'Neil (2)	2,513	6–4	
March 4	vs. Cal State Northridge	#17	Hawkins Field • Nashville, TN	1–4	Vanderford (2–1)	**Raby** (2–1)	—	2,713	6–5	
March 5	vs. Cal State Northridge	#17	Hawkins Field • Nashville, TN	11–3	**Fellows** (2–0)	Myers (1–1)	—	2,679	7–5	
March 7	vs. Central Arkansas	#25	Hawkins Field • Nashville, TN	10–5	**King** (1–0)	Brand (1–1)	—	2,443	8–5	
March 8	vs. Central Arkansas	#25	Hawkins Field • Nashville, TN	9–1	**Day** (1–0)	Schmidt (0–2)	—	2,489	9–5	
March 10	vs. St. Mary's	#25	Hawkins Field • Nashville, TN	9–8	**Snider** (2–1)	Waldichuk (1–1)	**Ruppenthal** (2)	2,528	10–5	
March 11	vs. St. Mary's	#25	Hawkins Field • Nashville, TN	1–5	Valdez (2–1)	**Raby** (2–2)	Milam (6)	—	10–6	
March 12	vs. St. Mary's	#25	Hawkins Field • Nashville, TN	9–1	**Fellows** (3–0)	Madrigal (2–2)	—	—	11–6	
March 14	vs. Western Kentucky	#24	Hawkins Field • Nashville, TN	8–1	**Day** (2–0)	Ciocco (0–2)	—	2,552	12–6	
March 17	at Ole Miss	#24	Oxford-University Stadium at Swayze Field • Oxford, MS	0–1	Parkinson (4–1)	**Wright** (0–3)	Woolfolk (5)	8,256	12–7	0–1
March 18	at Ole Miss	#24	Oxford-University Stadium at Swayze Field • Oxford, MS	6–2	**Raby** (3–2)	Feigl (2–2)	—	9,010	13–7	1–1
March 19	at Ole Miss	#24	Oxford-University Stadium at Swayze Field • Oxford, MS	8–10	Woolfolk (1–1)	**Murfee** (0–1)	—	8,221	13–8	1–2
March 22	vs. Belmont		First Tennessee Park • Nashville, TN	17–11	**Day** (3–0)	Lovell (0–1)	—	1,617	14–8	1–2
March 24	vs. Texas A&M		Hawkins Field • Nashville, TN	4–3	**Wright** (1–3)	Hill (4–2)	Hayes (4)	3,418	15–8	2–2
March 25	vs. Texas A&M		Hawkins Field • Nashville, TN	17–3	**Raby** (4–2)	Kolek (1–1)	—	3,309	16–8	3–2
March 26	vs. Texas A&M		Hawkins Field • Nashville, TN	4–6	Chafin (2–1)	**Snider** (2–2)	Kilkenny (1)	3,586	16–9	3–3
March 28	vs. Lipscomb		First Tennessee Park • Nashville, TN	10–0	**Day** (4–0)	Pryor (1–1)	—	1,502	17–9	3–3
March 31	at Kentucky		Shively Field at Cliff Hagan Stadium • Lexington, KY	3–10	Hjelle (4–2)	**Raby (4–3)**	—	2,465	17–10	3–4

April
Date	Opponent	Rank	Site/stadium	Score	Win	Loss	Save	Attendance	Overall record	SEC record
April 1	at Kentucky		Shively Field at Cliff Hagan Stadium • Lexington, KY	4–7	Logue (5–1)	**Wright** (1–4)	—	3,071	17–11	3–5
April 2	at Kentucky		Shively Field at Cliff Hagan Stadium • Lexington, KY	6–4	**Conger** (2–0)	Pop (1–1)	**Ruppenthal (3)**	3,512	18–11	4–5
April 4	vs. UT-Martin		Hawkins Field • Nashville, TN	11–0	**Day** (5–0)	Patzner (1–3)	—	2,655	19–11	4–5
April 6	at South Carolina		Founders Park • Columbia, SC	7–6	**Raby** (5–3)	Crowe (3–2)	**Hayes (5)**	6,904	20–11	5–5
April 7	at South Carolina		Founders Park • Columbia, SC	5–3	**Ruppenthal** (1–1)	Scott (1–2)	—	7,412	21–11	6–5
April 8	at South Carolina		Founders Park • Columbia, SC	1–6	Hill (2–3)	**Fellows** (3–1)	—	8,012	21–12	6–6
April 11	vs. Tennessee Tech		Hawkins Field • Nashville, TN	2–5	Lancaster (4–1)	**Day** (5–1)	—	2,563	21–13	6–6
April 13	vs. Florida		Hawkins Field • Nashville, TN	6–10	Milchin (2–1)	**Hayes** (0–1)	—	3,148	21–14	6–7
April 14	vs. Florida		Hawkins Field • Nashville, TN	2–0	**Wright** (2–4)	Singer (4–2)	—	3,626	22–14	7–7
April 15	vs. Florida		Hawkins Field • Nashville, TN	8–20	Kowar (6–0)	**Fellows** (3–2)	—	3,626	22–15	7–8
April 18	vs. Middle Tennessee		Hawkins Field • Nashville, TN	21–2	**Snider** (3–2)	Williams (0–3)	—	1,125	23–15	7–8
April 21	at Georgia		Foley Field • Athens, GA	8–1	**Raby** (6–3)	Gist (2–3)	—	2,547	24–15	8–8
April 22	at Georgia		Foley Field • Athens, GA	0–1	Adkins (5–4)	**Ruppenthal** (1–2)	—	—	24–16	8–9
April 22	at Georgia		Foley Field • Athens, GA	10–5	**Day** (6–1)	Avidano (2–2)	**Fellows (1)**	3,112	25–16	9–9
April 28	vs. Tennessee		Hawkins Field • Nashville, TN	1–0	**Raby** (7–3)	Martin (4–5)	**Hayes (6)**	3,499	26–16	10–9
April 29	vs. Tennessee		Hawkins Field • Nashville, TN	3–9	Stallings (3–1)	**Wright** (2–5)	—	3,603	26–17	10–10

May
Date	Opponent	Rank	Site/stadium	Score	Win	Loss	Save	Attendance	Overall record	SEC record
May 2	vs Austin Peay		Hawkins Field • Nashville, TN	8–4	**Day** (7–1)	Powell (2–4)	—	2,646	27–17	10–10
May 5	vs Missouri		Hawkins Field • Nashville, TN	5–2	**Raby** (8–3)	Bartlett (5–2)	**Hayes (7)**	2,936	28–17	11–10
May 6	vs Missouri		Hawkins Field • Nashville, TN	1–2	Sikema (7–0)	**Conger** (2–1)	—	2,960	28–18	11–11
May 7	vs Missouri		Hawkins Field • Nashville, TN	14–5	**King** (2–0)	Montes (3–5)	—	3,012	29–18	12–11
May 9	at Louisville		Jim Patterson Stadium • Louisville, KY	2–6	Martin (4–0)	**Ruppenthal** (1–3)	—	4,120	29–19	12–11
May 12	at Arkansas		Baum Stadium • Fayetteville, Arkansas	3–4	Kopps (3–0)	**King** (2–1)	—	8,151	29–20	12–12
May 13	at Arkansas		Baum Stadium • Fayetteville, Arkansas	6–2	**Wright** (3–5)	Knight (6–4)	—	9,225	30–20	13–12
May 14	at Arkansas		Baum Stadium • Fayetteville, Arkansas	1–7	Taccolini (4–0)	**Day** (7–2)	—	7,971	30–21	13–13
May 16	at Middle Tennessee		Hawkins Field • Nashville, TN	17–7	**Ruppenthal** (2–3)	Hasper (0–3)	—	2,682	31–21	13–13
May 18	at Alabama		Hawkins Field • Nashville, TN	18–1	**Raby** (9–3)	Medders (2–1)	—	2,904	32–21	14–13
May 19	at Alabama		Hawkins Field • Nashville, TN	13–1	**Wright** (4–5)	Walters (5–5)	—	3,110	33–21	15–13
May 20	at Alabama		Hawkins Field • Nashville, TN	3–3	—	—	—	2,928	33–21–1	15–13–1

Postseason

SEC Tournament
Date	Opponent	Rank	Site/stadium	Score	Win	Loss	Save	Attendance	Overall record	SEC record
May 23	South Carolina		Hoover Metropolitan Stadium • Hoover, Alabama	4–7	Johnson (1–2)	**Hayes** (0–2)	—	—	33–22–1	15–13–1

NCAA tournament Clemson Regional
Date	Opponent	Rank	Site/stadium	Score	Win	Loss	Save	Attendance	Overall record	SEC record
June 2	St. John's		Doug Kingsmore Stadium • Clemson, South Carolina,	13—4	**Raby** (10—3)	Mooney (8—2)	—	3,234	34–22–1	15–13–1
June 3	#21 Clemson		Doug Kingsmore Stadium • Clemson, South Carolina,	9—4	**Wright** (5—5)	Barnes (5—5)	—	5,097	35–22–1	15–13–1
June 4	#21 Clemson		Doug Kingsmore Stadium • Clemson, South Carolina,	0—6	Jackson (9—1)	**Fellows** (3—3)	—	3,731	35–23–1	15–13–1
June 5	#21 Clemson		Doug Kingsmore Stadium • Clemson, South Carolina,	8—0	**Ruppenthal** (3—3)	Eubanks (7—6)	—	4,462	36–23–1	15–13–1

NCAA tournament Corvallis Super Regional
Date	Opponent	Rank	Site/stadium	Score	Win	Loss	Save	Attendance	Overall record	SEC record
June 9	#1 Oregon State		Goss Stadium at Coleman Field • Corvallis, Oregon	4—8	Thompson (14—0)	**Raby** (10—4)	—	3,737	36—24—1	15–13–1
June 10	#1 Oregon State		Goss Stadium at Coleman Field • Corvallis, Oregon	2—9	Fehmel (5—2)	**Wright** (5—6)	—	3,734	36—25—1	15–13–1

== Record vs. conference opponents ==
Last two do not qualify for conf. tourn. Blank are not scheduled. Blue are home games, otherwise away.

2017 SEC baseball records Source: 2017 SEC baseball game results
Team	W–L	ALA	ARK	AUB	FLA	UGA	KEN	LSU	MSU	MIZZ	MISS	SCAR	TENN	TAMU	VAN	Team	Div	SR	SW
ALA	5–24		1–2	3–0	0–3	.	.	0–3	0–3	0–3	0–3	1–2	.	0–3	0–2	ALA	W7	1–9	1–6
ARK	18–11	2–1		1–2	.	3–0	.	1–2	3–0	2–1	1–2	.	1–1	2–1	2–1	ARK	W2	6–3	2–0
AUB	16–14	0–3	2–1		3–0	2–1	.	0–3	2–1	.	2–1	2–1	2–1	1–2	.	AUB	W5	7–3	1–2
FLA	21–9	3–0	.	0–3		3–0	2–1	2–1	.	3–0	3–0	2–1	1–2	.	2–1	FLA	E1	8–2	4–1
UGA	11–19	.	0–3	1–2	0–3		2–1	0–3	2–1	1–2	.	2–1	2–1	.	1–2	UGA	E6	4–6	0–3
KEN	19–11	.	.	.	1–2	1–2		2–1	1–2	2–1	2–1	2–1	3–0	3–0	2–1	KEN	E2	7–3	2–0
LSU	21–9	3–0	2–1	3–0	1–2	3–0	1–2		3–0	.	2–1	2–1	.	1–2	.	LSU	W1	7–3	4–0
MSU	17–13	3–0	0–3	1–2	.	1–2	2–1	0–3		.	3–0	2–1	3–0	2–1	.	MSU	W3	6–4	3–2
MIZZ	14–16	3–0	1–2	.	0–3	2–1	1–2	.	.		1–2	2–1	3–0	0–3	1–2	MIZZ	E4	4–6	2–2
MISS	14–16	3–0	2–1	1–2	0–3	.	1–2	1–2	0–3	2–1		.	.	2–1	2–1	MISS	W6	5–5	1–2
SCAR	13–17	2–1	.	1–2	1–2	1–2	1–2	1–2	1–2	1–2	.		3–0	.	1–2	SCAR	E5	2–8	1–0
TENN	7–21	.	1–1	1–2	2–1	1–2	0–3	.	0–3	0–3	.	0–3		1–2	1–1	TENN	E7	1–7	0–4
TAMU	16–14	3–0	1–2	2–1	.	.	0–3	2–1	1–2	3–0	1–2	.	2–1		1–2	TAMU	W4	5–5	2–1
VAN	15–13	2–0	1–2	.	1–2	2–1	1–2	.	.	2–1	1–2	2–1	1–1	2–1		VAN	E3	5–4	0–0
Team	W–L	ALA	ARK	AUB	FLA	UGA	KEN	LSU	MSU	MIZZ	MISS	SCAR	TENN	TAMU	VAN	Team	Div	SR	SW

Updated for entire regular season. Alabama and Vanderbilt had one tie game.
