= John Doxakis =

American baseball player (born 1998)

Free agent
- Pitcher
- Born: August 20, 1998 (age 26); Houston, Texas, U.S.
- Bats: Right Throws: Left

John West Doxakis (born August 20, 1998) is an American professional baseball pitcher who is a free agent.

== Amateur career ==
Doxakis attended Lamar High School in Houston, Texas, and played college baseball at Texas A&M University. In 2014, he helped the West University Little League win the Senior Division of the 2014 Little League World Series in Bangor, Maine. In 2018, he played for the USA Baseball Collegiate National Team. As a junior at Texas A&M in 2019, he pitched 104 2/3 innings and went 7–4 with a 2.06 ERA and 115 strikeouts.

== Professional career ==
=== Tampa Bay Rays ===
Doxakis was selected by the Tampa Bay Rays in the second round with the 61st overall selection of the 2019 Major League Baseball draft. He signed for $1.13 million.

Doxakis made his professional debut with the Hudson Valley Renegades and appeared in 12 games, posting a 1.93 ERA with 31 strikeouts over 32 2/3 innings. He split the 2021 season between the Charleston RiverDogs and Bowling Green Hot Rods with whom he started 21 games and went 9–2 with a 3.94 ERA and 114 strikeouts over 102 2/3 innings. He returned to Bowling Green to open the 2022 season and was promoted to the Montgomery Biscuits in late May. Over 27 games (25 starts) between the two teams, he went 4–8 with a 4.89 ERA and 113 strikeouts over 116 innings. Doxakis spent a majority of the 2023 season with Montgomery, going 8-3 with a 5.47 ERA over 82 1/3 innings pitched in relief; he also played in one game for the Durham Bulls.

=== Cleveland Guardians ===
On December 6, 2023, the Cleveland Guardians selected Doxakis from the Rays in the minor league phase of the Rule 5 draft. He began the 2024 season with the Triple-A Columbus Clippers. In 20 games for the Clippers, he struggled to a 7.26 ERA with 30 strikeouts across 31 innings pitched. Doxakis was released by the Guardians organization on July 9, 2024.
