= Ryan Rolison =

American baseball player (born 1997)

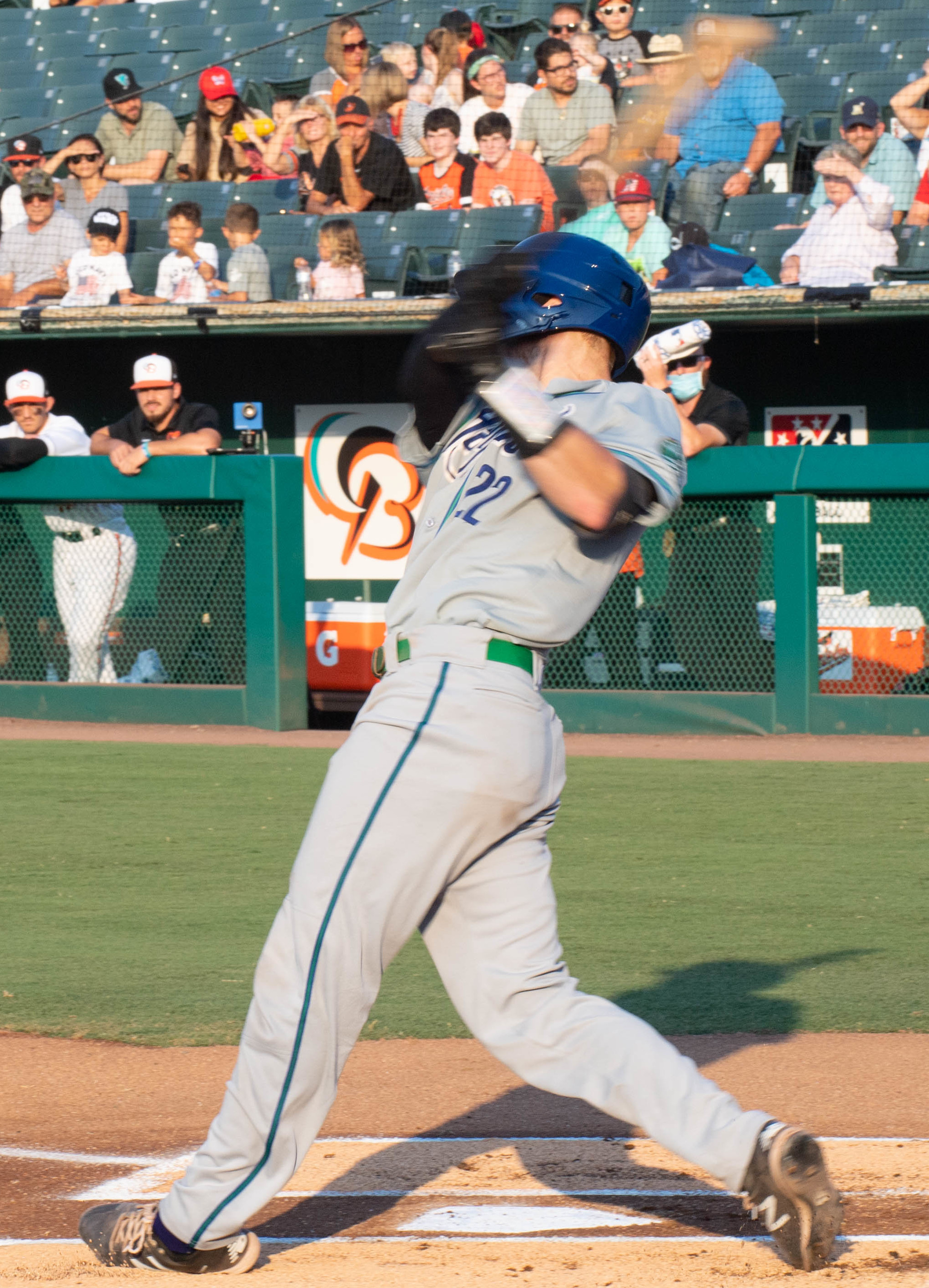
- Rolison with the Hartford Yard Goats in 2021

Chicago Cubs – No. 33
- Pitcher
- Born: July 11, 1997 (age 29); Jackson, Tennessee, U.S.
- Bats: Right Throws: Left

MLB debut
- May 13, 2025, for the Colorado Rockies

MLB statistics (through 2026 season)
- Win–loss record: 10–2
- Earned run average: 4.70
- Strikeouts: 80
- Stats at Baseball Reference

Teams
- Colorado Rockies (2025); Chicago Cubs (2026–present)
Medals
Men's baseball
Representing United States
U-18 Baseball World Cup
Gold medal – first place	2015 Osaka	Team

Ryan Perry Rolison (born July 11, 1997) is an American professional baseball pitcher for the Chicago Cubs of Major League Baseball (MLB). He has previously played in MLB for the Colorado Rockies. He played college baseball for the Ole Miss Rebels and was selected by the Rockies in the first round of the 2018 MLB draft. He made his MLB debut in 2025.

== Amateur career ==
Rolison attended and graduated from the University School of Jackson in Jackson, Tennessee. As a junior, he compiled a 0.74 ERA with 104 strikeouts. As a senior, he was 9–0 in nine starts, striking out 108 in 58 innings while allowing only three runs and ten hits, earning him the title of Tennessee's DII-A Mr. Baseball. He was selected by the San Diego Padres in the 37th round of the 2016 Major League Baseball draft, but did not sign and instead enrolled at the University of Mississippi where he played college baseball.

As a freshman in 2017, Rolison began the season in the bullpen before moving into the starting rotation. In 19 games (ten starts), he compiled a 6–3 record and a 3.06 ERA, holding opposing batters to a .242 average, earning him a spot on the SEC All-Freshman team along with freshman All-American honors. After his freshman season, he played for the Orleans Firebirds of the Cape Cod Baseball League where he went 4–0 with a 1.92 ERA and was named a league all-star. Rolison was named a First Team Preseason All-American prior to his sophomore season. As a sophomore in 2018, Rolison posted a 10–4 record over 17 appearances (16 starts) with a 3.70 ERA and 120 strikeouts.

== Professional career ==
=== Colorado Rockies ===
The Colorado Rockies selected Rolison in the first round, with the 22nd overall selection, in the 2018 Major League Baseball draft, and he signed with the Rockies for a $2.9 million signing bonus. He made his professional debut with the Grand Junction Rockies of the Rookie-level Pioneer League and spent the whole season there. In nine starts, he compiled a 0–1 record with a 1.86 ERA and a 0.79 WHIP.

Rolison began 2019 with the Asheville Tourists of the Single-A South Atlantic League. Rolison was promoted to the Lancaster JetHawks of the High-A California League after going 2–1 with a 0.69 ERA and 14 strikeouts in 14 2/3 innings with the Tourists. With Lancaster, he was selected to participate in the All-Star Game as a member of the South Division team. Over 22 starts with the JetHawks, Rolison went 6–7 with a 4.87 ERA, striking out 118 over 116 1/3 innings. He did not play in a game in 2020 due to the cancellation of the minor league season because of the COVID-19 pandemic. To begin the 2021 season, Rolison was assigned to the Hartford Yard Goats of the Double-A Northeast. After going 2–1 with a 3.07 ERA over three starts, he was promoted to the Albuquerque Isotopes of the Triple-A West. On June 14, he was placed on the injured list after having his appendix removed. He was expected to return in early August, but broke a bone in his left hand while fielding balls, delaying his return. He was activated later that same month. Over ten starts with the Isotopes, Rolison went 2–2 with a 5.91 ERA and 45 strikeouts over 45 2/3 innings. Following the end of the season, Rolison began playing in the Dominican Professional Baseball League for the Tigres del Licey.

On November 19, 2021, the Rockies selected Rolison's contract and added him to their 40-man roster. He opened the 2022 season on the injured list with a shoulder injury. In June, it was announced that Rolison was scheduled for surgery and would miss the entire season. On March 25, 2023, Rolison was placed on the 60-day injured list to begin the year. After rehabbing with the Single-A Fresno Grizzlies, Rolison was activated from the injured list on May 29 and optioned to Triple-A Albuquerque. He was placed back on the injured list with an unspecified injury on June 4, and was transferred back to the 60-day injured list on July 14. Following the season on October 20, Rolison was removed from the 40-man roster and sent outright to Triple–A Albuquerque.

In 2024, Rolison began pitching primarily out of the bullpen, splitting the year between the rookie-level Arizona Complex League Rockies, High-A Spokane Indians, and Albuquerque. In 29 appearances (5 starts) for the three affiliates, he accumulated a 2–3 record and 4.47 ERA with 35 strikeouts across 46 1/3 innings pitched.

Rolison began 2025 back with Albuquerque, recording a 3–1 record and 3.72 ERA with 23 strikeouts over his first 12 games. On May 11, 2025, Rolison was selected to the 40-man roster and promoted to the major leagues for the first time. On August 16, Rolison recorded his first career win, tossing a scoreless inning of relief against the Arizona Diamondbacks. He made 31 appearances for the Rockies during his rookie campaign, but struggled to a 7.02 ERA with 25 strikeouts across 42 1/3 innings pitched. On November 18, Rolison was designated for assignment by Colorado.

=== Chicago Cubs ===
On November 19, 2025, Rolison was traded to the Atlanta Braves in exchange for cash. He was designated for assignment by the Braves following the signing of Robert Suárez on December 11. The next day, Rolison was claimed off waivers by the Chicago White Sox. He was designated for assignment by Chicago following the signing of Sean Newcomb on December 23. On January 7, 2026, Rolison was claimed off waivers by the Chicago Cubs. He was optioned to the Triple-A Iowa Cubs to begin the regular season. He was called up to the Cubs and made his regular season debut in a 10-4 win over the Phillies on April 14, throwing one shutout inning.

== Personal life ==
The same night that Rolison was selected by the Rockies in the draft, controversy emerged after a tweet by him from 2012 resurfaced in which he wrote “Well we have one hope left … if someone shoots him during his speech,” regarding the 2012 United States presidential election. He later apologized, saying “I had no idea what I was talking about, and it was immature of me to post something like that.”
