= Missouri Tigers baseball 2010–2019 =

American college baseball seasons

Amid an otherwise undistinguished decade, the Missouri Tigers baseball team won the Big 12 Conference tournament in 2012. The team moved from the Big 12 Conference to the Eastern division of the Southeastern Conference in 2013. The Tigers struggled the first two seasons after the change of Conference, then improved to a limited extent. As of 2018 their best performance during the decade in a Conference league was in 2015 (won 15 out of 30, 50.0%) and their best overall performance was in 2018 (won 25 out of 37, 67.6%). Tim Jamieson retired as head coach in 2016 after 22 years, to be replaced by Steve Bieser.

== 2010 ==
2010 Missouri Tigers baseball
- Conference: Big 12 Conference
- Record: 29–26 (10–16 Big 12)
- Head coach: Tim Jamieson (16th year)
- Assistant coach: Evan Pratte, 13th year Tony Vitello, 8th year

2010 Big 12 Conference baseball standings
	Conf.						Overall
Team	W		L		T	PCT	W		L		T	PCT
No. 9 Texas ‍†‍‍^{y}	24	–	3	–	0	.889	50	–	13	–	0	.794
No. 5 Oklahoma ‍‍‍^{y}	15	–	10	–	0	.600	50	–	18	–	0	.735
Kansas State ‍‍‍^{y}	14	–	12	–	0	.538	37	–	22	–	0	.627
No. 18 Texas A&M ‍‍‡‍^{y}	14	–	12	–	1	.537	43	–	21	–	1	.669
Texas Tech ‍‍‍	13	–	14	–	0	.481	28	–	29	–	0	.491
Baylor ‍‍‍^{y}	12	–	13	–	0	.480	36	–	24	–	0	.600
Kansas ‍‍‍	11	–	15	–	1	.426	31	–	27	–	1	.534
Missouri ‍‍‍	10	–	16	–	0	.385	29	–	26	–	0	.527
Nebraska ‍‍‍	10	–	17	–	0	.370	27	–	27	–	0	.500
Oklahoma State ‍‍‍	8	–	19	–	0	.296	29	–	26	–	0	.527
† – Conference champion ‡ – Tournament champion y – Invited to the NCAA tournament Rankings from Collegiate Baseball

=== Roster ===
2010 Missouri Tigers baseball team
Players
Coaches

#	Pos.	Name	B/T	Height	Weight	Year	Home town
4	C	Ryan Ampleman	R/R	5 ft 8 in (1.73 m)	179 lb (81 kg)	Jr	St. Peters, MO
44	RHP	Eric Anderson	R/R	6 ft 4 in (1.93 m)	210 lb (95 kg)	Fr	Highlands Ranch, CO
14	LHP	Aaron Blunt	L/L	6 ft 3 in (1.91 m)	195 lb (88 kg)	Jr	Bonne Terre, MO
39	OF	Blake Brown	R/R	6 ft 1 in (1.85 m)	185 lb (84 kg)	Fr	Normal, IL
40	RHP	Brad Buehler	S/R	6 ft 1 in (1.85 m)	207 lb (94 kg)	Jr	Festus, MO
24	LHP	Kenny Burton	L/L	6 ft 2 in (1.88 m)	170 lb (77 kg)	Fr	Oklahoma City, OK
6	OF	Brannon Champagne	L/R	6 ft 0 in (1.83 m)	180 lb (82 kg)	Fr	St. Charles, MO
16	RHP	Tyler Clark	R/R	6 ft 2 in (1.88 m)	201 lb (91 kg)	Jr	Springfield, MO
29	RHP	Ryan Clubb	R/R	6 ft 3 in (1.91 m)	198 lb (90 kg)	So	Eureka, MO
20	RHP	Jeff Emens	R/R	6 ft 0 in (1.83 m)	173 lb (78 kg)	So	Plano, TX
21	LHP	Kelly Fick	L/L	6 ft 2 in (1.88 m)	188 lb (85 kg)	Jr	Linn, MO
7	C	Kyle Gaden	L/R	5 ft 11 in (1.8 m)	175 lb (79 kg)	Fr	Stillwater, OK
10	INF	Eric Garcia	S/R	5 ft 11 in (1.8 m)	175 lb (79 kg)	Fr	Pflugerville, TX
37	OF	Ryan Gebhart	S/R	6 ft 0 in (1.83 m)	172 lb (78 kg)	So	Waco, TX
38	LHP	Zack Hardoin	L/L	5 ft 10 in (1.78 m)	201 lb (91 kg)	Jr	Spring, TX
13	RHP	Neil Hugenberg	R/R	5 ft 10 in (1.78 m)	175 lb (79 kg)	Fr	Hannibal, MO
2	OF	Russell LaFleur	S/R	5 ft 10 in (1.78 m)	162 lb (73 kg)	So	Houston, TX
5	INF	Michael Liberto	R/R	5 ft 9 in (1.75 m)	165 lb (75 kg)	Sr	Harahan, LA
45	OF	Jeff Lusardi	L/R	5 ft 10 in (1.78 m)	188 lb (85 kg)	RS Fr	Blue Springs, MO
28	INF	Conner Mach	R/R	6 ft 0 in (1.83 m)	189 lb (86 kg)	So	Chesterfield, MO
30	RHP	Kevin Mahler	R/R	6 ft 3 in (1.91 m)	205 lb (93 kg)	Jr	St. Louis, MO
36	INF	Garrison McLagan	L/L	5 ft 11 in (1.8 m)	191 lb (87 kg)	So	Columbia, MO
27	LHP	Phil McCormick	L/L	6 ft 0 in (1.83 m)	184 lb (83 kg)	Jr	Wildwood, MO
11	C	Brett Nicholas	L/L	6 ft 2 in (1.88 m)	210 lb (95 kg)	Jr	Phoenix, AZ
47	OF	Dane Opel	L/L	6 ft 2 in (1.88 m)	190 lb (86 kg)	Fr	Edwardsville, IL
55	C	Andreas Plackis	R/R	6 ft 0 in (1.83 m)	203 lb (92 kg)	RS Fr	St. Charles, MO
35	OF	Andre Rodriguez	R/R	5 ft 11 in (1.8 m)	191 lb (87 kg)	RS Fr	McAllen, TX
41	INF	Jesse Santo	R/R	5 ft 11 in (1.8 m)	185 lb (84 kg)	Jr	Little Falls, NJ
42	LHP	Jeff Scardino	L/L	5 ft 9 in (1.75 m)	194 lb (88 kg)	Jr	Tulsa, OK
25	OF	Jonah Schmidt	R/R	6 ft 3 in (1.91 m)	213 lb (97 kg)	Jr	St. Louis, MO
17	OF	Aaron Senne	L/L	6 ft 2 in (1.88 m)	199 lb (90 kg)	Sr	Rochester, MN
49	INF	Scott Sommerfield	R/R	6 ft 0 in (1.83 m)	190 lb (86 kg)	Fr	Manchester, MO
46	RHP	Nick Tepesch	R/R	6 ft 5 in (1.96 m)	225 lb (102 kg)	Jr	Blue Springs, MO
3	INF	Andrew Thigpen	R/R	5 ft 11 in (1.8 m)	188 lb (85 kg)	Jr	Midwest City, OK
18	C	Ben Turner	R/R	6 ft 4 in (1.93 m)	220 lb (100 kg)	Fr	St. Charles, MO

Head coach

9 Tim Jamieson (16th year)

Assistant coach(es)

23 Evan Pratte (13th year)
22 Tony Vitello (8th year)

Legend

- (C) Team captain
- (S) Suspended
- (I) Ineligible
- Injured
- Current redshirt

=== Schedule ===
2010 Missouri Tigers baseball game log
Regular season
February

Date	Opponent	Score	Overall record	Big 12 record
February 19	vs. Gonzaga	6–10	0–1	–
February 20	vs. Washington	17–6	1–1	–
February 21	vs. New Mexico State	2–1	2–1	–
February 26	vs. Florida Atlantic	4–2	3–1	–
February 27	at Auburn	11–7	4–1	–
February 28	vs. Boston College	6–14	4–2	–

March

Date	Opponent	Score	Overall record	Big 12 record
March 5	vs. Houston	0–3	4–3	–
March 6	vs. TCU	3–4	4–4	–
March 7	vs. Texas	5–8	4–5	–
March 10	Western Illinois	10–3	5–5	–
March 12	Xavier	7–6	6–5	–
March 13	Xavier	4–2	7–5	–
March 14	Xavier	1–5	7–6	–
March 18	North Dakota	17–5	8–6	–
March 19	North Dakota	7–3	9–6	–
March 20	North Dakota	6–0	10–6	–
March 23	Arkansas Pine Bluff	9–0	11–6	–
March 24	Arkansas Pine Bluff	28–2	12–6	–
March 26	at Texas A&M	1–3	12–7	0–1
March 27	at Texas A&M	4–5	12–8	0–2
March 28	at Texas A&M	13–4	13–8	1–2
March 30	Purdue	22–14	14–8	–
March 31	Purdue	3–6	14–9	–

April

Date	Opponent	Score	Overall record	Big 12 record
April 2	Baylor	6–20	14–10	1–3
April 3	Baylor	3–7	14–11	1–4
April 4	Baylor	13–9	15–11	2–4
April 6	SIU Edwardsville	14–3	16–11	–
April 7	vs. Illinois	5–4	17–11	–
April 9	at Oklahoma	4–6	17–12	2–5
April 10	at Oklahoma	4–10	17–13	2–6
April 11	at Oklahoma	12–11	18–13	3–6
April 14	at Missouri State	4–5	18–14	–
April 16	Oklahoma State	9–2	19–14	4–6
April 17	Oklahoma State	7–10	19–15	4–7
April 18	Oklahoma State	3–4	19–16	4–8
April 21	vs. Kansas	0–1	19–17	–
April 25	Kansas State	4–2	20–17	5–8
April 25	Kansas State	9–8	21–17	6–8
April 27	vs. Eastern Illinois	10–2	22–17	–
April 30	at Texas Tech	12–8	23–17	7–8

May

Date	Opponent	Score	Overall record	Big 12 record
May 1	at Texas Tech	4–5	23–18	7–9
May 2	at Texas Tech	15–16	23–19	7–10
May 4	Missouri State	11–6	24–19	–
May 7	at Kansas	3–10	24–20	7–11
May 8	at Kansas	8–9	24–21	7–12
May 9	at Kansas	9–10	24–22	7–13
May 14	Nebraska	2–0	25–22	8–13
May 15	Nebraska	12–7	26–22	9–13
May 16	Nebraska	6–5	27–22	10–13
May 21	Texas	2–5	27–23	10–14
May 22	Texas	4–6	27–24	10–15
May 23	Texas	11–20	27–25	10–16

Postseason
Big 12 Tournament

Date	Opponent	Site/stadium	Score	Overall record
May 26	vs. Texas	Chickasaw Bricktown Ballpark	7–3	28–25
May 27	vs. Texas A&M	Chickasaw Bricktown Ballpark	2–7	28–26
May 29	vs. Texas Tech	Chickasaw Bricktown Ballpark	7–3	29–26

=== Tigers in the 2010 MLB draft ===
The following members of the Missouri Tigers baseball program were drafted in the 2010 Major League Baseball draft.

Player	Position	Round	Overall	MLB team
Brett Nicholas	C	6th	196th	Texas Rangers
Aaron Senne	1B	10th	317th	Florida Marlins
Nick Tepesch	RHP	14th	436th	Texas Rangers
Michael Liberto	SS	21st	629th	Kansas City Royals
Tyler Clark	RHP	24th	733rd	Detroit Tigers

== 2011 ==
2011 Missouri Tigers baseball
- Conference: Big 12 Conference
- Record: 27–32 (11–15 Big 12)
- Head coach: Tim Jamieson (17th year)
- Assistant coach: Kerrick Jackson (1st year); Matt Hobbs (1st year)
- Home stadium: Taylor Stadium

2011 Big 12 Conference baseball standings
	Conf.				Overall
Team	W		L	PCT	W		L	PCT
No. 7 Texas ‍†‍‍^{y}	19	–	8	.704	49	–	19	.721
No. 8 Texas A&M ‍†‍‡‍^{y}	19	–	8	.704	47	–	22	.681
Oklahoma ‍‍‍^{y}	14	–	11	.560	41	–	19	.683
Oklahoma State ‍‍‍^{y}	14	–	12	.538	35	–	25	.583
Baylor ‍‍‍^{y}	13	–	14	.481	31	–	28	.525
Kansas State ‍‍‍^{y}	12	–	14	.462	36	–	25	.590
Texas Tech ‍‍‍	12	–	15	.444	33	–	25	.569
Missouri ‍‍‍	11	–	15	.423	27	–	32	.458
Nebraska ‍‍‍	9	–	17	.346	30	–	25	.545
Kansas ‍‍‍	9	–	18	.333	26	–	30	.464
† – Conference champion ‡ – Tournament champion y – Invited to the NCAA tournament As of June 30, 2011; Rankings from Collegiate Baseball

=== Schedule and results ===
2011 Missouri Tigers baseball game log
Regular season (24–30)

February (2–5)
Date	Opponent	Rank	Site/stadium	Score	Win	Loss	Save	TV	Attendance	Overall record	Big 12 record
Feb. 18	vs. Cal Poly*		Dedeaux Field; Los Angeles, CA	**W** 10–96	**Ross** (1–0)	Wright (0–1)			312	1–0	
Feb. 19	vs. USC*		Dedeauk Field	**L** 3–9	Mezger (1–0)	**Zastryzny** (0–1)				1–1	
Feb. 20	vs. No. 27 North Carolina*		Dedeaux Field	**L** 3–11	Smith (1–0)	**Hardoin** (0–1)				1–2	
Feb. 25	at Charlotte*		Robert and Mariam Hayes Stadium; Charlotte, NC	**L** 4–5	Smith (2–0)	**McCormick** (0–1)	Hamilton (1)		993	1–3	
Feb. 26	at Charlotte*		Robert and Mariam Hayes Stadium	**L** 2–3	Bryan (1–0)	**Buehler** (0–1)			1,136	1–4	
Feb. 26	at Charlotte*		Robert and Mariam Hayes Stadium	**W** 4–2^{12}	**McCormick** (1–1)	Hamilton (0–1)			1,136	2–4	
Feb. 27	at Charlotte*		Robert and Mariam Hayes Stadium	**L** 7–22	Pilkington (1–0)	**Hardion** (0–2)	Hudgens (1)		1,153	2–5	

March (11–7)
Date	Opponent	Rank	Site/stadium	Score	Win	Loss	Save	TV	Attendance	Overall record	Big 12 record
Mar. 4	UIC*		Taylor Stadium; Columbia, MO	**Canceled**							
Mar. 5	UIC*		Taylor Stadium	**L** 7–11	Begel (1–1)	**Stites** (0–1)				2–6	
Mar. 5	UIC*		Taylor Stadium	**W** 11–4	**Zastryzny** (1–1)	Weinberg (0–2)			288	3–6	
Mar. 6	UIC*		Taylor Stadium	**L** 1–5	Heaslip (1–1)	**Scardino** (0–1)			336	3–7	
Mar. 8	Gonzaga*		Taylor Stadium	**W** 5–2	**Hardoin** (1–2)	Moon (1–1)	**McCormick** (1)		147	4–7	
Mar. 9	Gonzaga*		Taylor Stadium	**L** 1–4	Gonzales (1–2)	**Buehler** (0–2)	Martin (1)		147	4–8	
Mar. 11	Le Moyne*		Taylor Stadium	**L** 5–6	Kuzma (1–2)	**Ross** (1–1)	Werniuk (2)		504	4–9	
Mar. 12	Le Moyne*		Taylor Stadium	**W** 7–4	**McCormick** (2–1)	Cannon (0–2)				5–9	
Mar. 12	Le Moyne*		Taylor Stadium	**W** 4–2	**Scardino** (1–1)	Nelson (0–3)	**Emens** (1)		726	6–9	
Mar. 13	Le Moyne*		Taylor Stadium	**W** 10–1	**Hardoin** (2–2)	Kohout (0–1)			345	7–9	
Mar. 18	Central Michigan*		Taylor Stadium	**W** 7–6	**Zastryzny** (2–1)	Howard (1–3)	**McCormick** (2)		345	8–9	
Mar. 19	Central Michigan*		Taylor Stadium	**W** 14–7	**Stites** (1–1)	Morrow			250	9–9	
Mar. 20	Central Michigan*		Taylor Stadium	**W** 8–6	**Buehler** (1–2)	Longstreth (0–3)				10–9	
Mar. 20	Central Michigan*		Taylor Stadium	**L** 1–8	Cooper (1–1)	**Scardino** (1–2)	Enns (1)		500	10–10	
Mar. 22	Central Arkansas*		Taylor Stadium	**W** 11–4	**Emens** (1–0)	Ward (2–2)			343	11–10	
Mar. 23	Central Arkansas*		Taylor Stadium	**L** 3–9	Steinmetz (1–0)	**Hardoin** (3–2)			393	11–11	
Mar. 25	No. 10 Oklahoma		Taylor Stadium	**L** 1–3	Rocha (6–0)	**Zastryzny** (2–2)	Duke (2)			11–12	0–1
Mar. 25	No. 10 Oklahoma		Taylor Stadium	**W** 2–1^{11}	**McCormick** (3–1)	Overton (3–2)			207	12–12	1–1
Mar. 26	No. 10 Oklahoma		Taylor Stadium	**Canceled**							
Mar. 27	No. 10 Oklahoma		Taylor Stadium	**Canceled**							
Mar. 29	vs. Illinois*		Busch Stadium; St. Louis, MO	**Postponed**							
Mar. 30	at Texas State*		Bobcat Ballpark; San Marcos, TX	**W** 3–2^{11}	**Fick** (1–0)	Adamek (2–1)			1,168	13–12	

April (6–12)
Date	Opponent	Rank	Site/stadium	Score	Win	Loss	Save	TV	Attendance	Overall record	Big 12 record
Apr. 1	at No. 8 Texas		UFCU Disch–Falk Field; Austin, TX	**L** 4–5	Jungmann (6–0)	**Emens** (1–1)	Milner (1)		6,337	13–13	1–2
Apr. 2	at No. 8 Texas		UFCU Disch–Falk Field	**L** 2–5	Milner (3–1)	**Stites** (1–2)	Knebel (7)		7,035	13–14	1–3
Apr. 3	at No. 8 Texas		UFCU Disch–Falk Field	**L** 1–10	Green (2–2)	**Hardoin** (2–4)			6,505	13–15	1–4
Apr. 6	vs. Kansas*		Kauffman Stadium; Kansas City, MO	**L** 1–7	Taylor (3–1)	**Smith** (0–1)			3,399	13–16	
Apr. 8	at Oklahoma State		Allie P. Reynolds Stadium; Stillwater, OK	**L** 2–3	Marlowe (2–2)	**McCormick** (3–2)				13–17	1–5
Apr. 9	at Oklahoma State		Allie P. Reynolds Stadium	**L** 1–4	Propst (6–1)	**Stites** (1–3)			1,064	13–18	1–6
Apr. 10	at Oklahoma State		Allie P. Reynolds Stadium	**L** 3–7	Heaney (4–2)	**Emens** (1–2)			729	13–19	1–7
Apr. 13	SIU–Edwardsville*		Taylor Stadium	**L** 2–7	Quattrocchi (2–2)	**Ross** (1–2)			408	13–20	
Apr. 15	Kansas		Taylor Stadium	**L** 3–8	Walz (–)	**Zastryzny** (2–3)				13–21	1–8
Apr. 16	Kansas		Taylor Stadium	**W** 3–2	**McCormick** (4–2)	Murray (2–1)			870	14–21	2–8
Apr. 17	Kansas		Taylor Stadium	**L** 0–6	Cox (2–3)	**Ross** (1–3)			1,113	14–22	2–9
Apr. 21	at Baylor		Baylor Ballpark; Waco, TX	**W** 4–2	**Buehler** (2–2)	Turley (2–3)	**McCormick** (3)		2,181	15–22	3–9
Apr. 22	at Baylor		Baylor Ballpark	**L** 3–6	Verrett (4–4)	**Zastryzny** (2–4)	Garner (4)		2,260	15–23	3–10
Apr. 23	at Baylor		Baylor Ballpark	**W** 10–1	**Stites** (2–3)	Blank (3–2)			2,482	16–23	4–10
Apr. 26	vs. Eastern Illinois *		T.R. Hughes Ballpark; O'Fallon, MO	**W** 7–5	**Ross** (2–3)	Barton (3–4)	**McCormick** (4)		1,234	17–23	
Apr. 27	Missouri State*		Taylor Stadium	**L** 2–5	Powers (1–0)	**Fick** (1–1)	Kickham (9)			17–24	
Apr. 29	No. 8 Texas A&M		Taylor Stadium	**W** 10–9	**McCormick** (5–2)	Hinojosa (1–1)			648	18–24	5–10
Apr. 30	No. 8 Texas A&M		Taylor Stadium	**W** 9–1	**Stites** (3–3)	Wacha (5–3)			1,176	19–24	6–10

May (5–6)
Date	Opponent	Rank	Site/stadium	Score	Win	Loss	Save	TV	Attendance	Overall record	Big 12 record
May 1	No. 8 Texas A&M		Taylor Stadium	**L** 2–3^{7}	Stripling (9–2)	**Ross** (2–4)			500	19–25	6–11
May 3	at Missouri State*		Hammons Field; Springfield, MO	**L** 0–5	Johnson (4–4)	**Scardino** (1–3)			1,243	19–26	
May 6	at Kansas State		Tointon Family Stadium; Manhattan, KS	**W** 5–4	**Anderson** (1–0)	Marshall (4–5)	**McCormick** (5)		1,619	20–26	7–11
May 7	at Kansas State		Tointon Family Stadium	**L** 5–8	Bahramzadeh (3–0)	**Stites** (3–4)			1,310	20–27	7–12
May 8	at Kansas State		Tointon Family Stadium	**W** 12–8	**Ross** (3–4)	Conlon (2–1)	**McCormick** (6)		1,036	21–27	8–12
May 13	Texas Tech		Taylor Stadium	**W** 11–1	**Anderson** (2–0)	Paiz (3–4)			342	22–27	9–12
May 14	Texas Tech		Taylor Stadium	**L** 4–6	Masek (4–3)	**Stites** (3–5)	Neely (7)		755	22–28	9–13
May 15	Texas Tech		Taylor Stadium	**W** 4–3	**McCormick** (6–2)	McCrummen (1–1)			378	23–28	10–13
May 19	at Nebraska		Haymarket Park; Lincoln, NE	**Postponed**							
May 20	at Nebraska		Haymarket Park	**W** 10–5	**McCormick** (7–2)	Hauptman (6–3)				24–28	11–13
May 21	at Nebraska		Haymarket Park	**L** 3–4	Niederklein (8–3)	**Fick** (1–2)	Vogt		2,624	24–29	11–14
May 21	at Nebraska		Haymarket Park	**L** 5–8	Keller (3–6)	**Zastryzny** (2–5)			2,624	24–30	11–15

Postseason (3–2)

Big 12 tournament (3–2)
Date	Opponent(Seed)	Rank(Seed)	Site/stadium	Score	Win	Loss	Save	TV	Attendance	Overall record	Tournament record
May 25	vs. No. 4 Texas (1)	(8)	RedHawks Ballpark; Oklahoma City, OK	**W** 6–4	**Anderson** (3–0)	Carrillo (4–1)	**McCormick** (7)		3,810	25–30	1–0
May 26	vs. Oklahoma State (4)	(8)	RedHawks Ballpark	**W** 6–5	**McCormick** (8–2)	Barnes (3–1)			4,020	26–30	2–0
May 27	vs. No. 4 Texas (1)	(8)	RedHawks Ballpark	**L** 1–6	Carillo (5–1)	**Stites** (3–6)			4,257	26–31	2–1
May 28	vs. No. 4 Texas (1)	(8)	RedHawks Ballpark	**W** 2–1	**Fick** (2–2)	Milner (6–4)	**McCormick** (8)		4,062	27–31	3–1
May 29	vs. No. 13 Texas A&M (2)	(8)	RedHawks Ballpark	**L** 9–10^{10}	Fleece (6–1)	**Ross** (3–5)			4,416	27–32	3–2

Legend: = Win = Loss = Canceled
Bold = Missouri team member
Rankings are based on the team's current ranking in the Collegiate Baseball poll.

== 2012 ==
2012 Missouri Tigers baseball

Big 12 Conference tournament Champions

Tucson Regional, 1–2
- Conference: Big 12 Conference
- Record: 33–28 (10–14 Big 12)
- Head coach: Tim Jamieson (18th year)
- Assistant coach: Kerrick Jackson (2nd year); Matt Hobbs (2nd year)
- Home stadium: Taylor Stadium

2012 Big 12 Conference baseball standings
	Conf.				Overall
Team	W		L	PCT	W		L	PCT
No. 10 Baylor ‍†‍‍^{y}	20	–	4	.833	49	–	17	.742
No. 19 Texas A&M ‍‍‍^{y}	16	–	8	.667	43	–	18	.705
Texas ‍‍‍	14	–	10	.583	30	–	22	.577
No. 13 Oklahoma ‍‍‍^{y}	13	–	10	.565	42	–	25	.627
Oklahoma State ‍‍‍	13	–	11	.542	32	–	25	.561
Missouri ‍‍‡‍^{y}	10	–	14	.417	33	–	28	.541
Kansas ‍‍‍	7	–	16	.304	24	–	34	.414
Kansas State ‍‍‍	7	–	17	.292	27	–	31	.466
Texas Tech ‍‍‍	7	–	17	.292	29	–	26	.527
† – Conference champion ‡ – Tournament champion y – Invited to the NCAA tournament Rankings from Collegiate Baseball

The Tigers won the Big 12 tournament and went 1–2 in the Tucson Regional in the NCAA tournament.

=== Roster ===
2012 Missouri Tigers baseball team
Players
Coaches

#	Pos.	Name	B/T	Height	Weight	Year	Home town
44	RHP	Eric Anderson	R/R	6 ft 5 in (1.96 m)	226 lb (103 kg)	Jr	Highlands Ranch, CO
45	LHP	Kyle Barbeck	L/L	6 ft 1 in (1.85 m)	198 lb (90 kg)	Jr	Blue Springs, MO
22	OF	Sal Belfonte	R/R	5 ft 10 in (1.78 m)	204 lb (93 kg)	So	Kansas City, MO
39	OF	Blake Brown	R/R	6 ft 1 in (1.85 m)	185 lb (84 kg)	Jr	Normal, IL
24	LHP	Kenny Burton	L/L	6 ft 2 in (1.88 m)	170 lb (77 kg)	RS So	Oklahoma City, OK
19	C	Justin Byrd	R/R	6 ft 1 in (1.85 m)	204 lb (93 kg)	Jr	Littleton, CO
14	C	Drew Carlile	R/R	6 ft 3 in (1.91 m)	210 lb (95 kg)	RS Fr	Fort Collins, CO
6	OF	Brannon Champagne	L/R	6 ft 0 in (1.83 m)	180 lb (82 kg)	Jr	St. Charles, MO
37	RHP	Jeff Cline	R/R	6 ft 2 in (1.88 m)	195 lb (88 kg)	RS So	Kansas City, MO
29	RHP	Ryan Clubb	R/R	6 ft 3 in (1.91 m)	198 lb (90 kg)	Sr	Eureka, MO
20	RHP	Jeff Emens	R/R	6 ft 0 in (1.83 m)	173 lb (78 kg)	Sr	Plano, TX
16	INF	Dillon Everett	R/R	5 ft 11 in (1.8 m)	184 lb (83 kg)	So	Phoenix, AZ
10	INF	Eric Garcia	S/R	5 ft 11 in (1.8 m)	175 lb (79 kg)	Jr	Pflugerville, TX
7	RHP	Brett Graves	R/R	6 ft 1 in (1.85 m)	173 lb (78 kg)	Fr	St. Charles, MO
25	RHP	Blake Holovach	L/L	6 ft 5 in (1.96 m)	195 lb (88 kg)	Jr	Overland Park, KS
40	LHP	Tyler House	L/L	6 ft 3 in (1.91 m)	202 lb (92 kg)	Fr	Richton Park, IL
21	UTL	Jake Ivory	R/R	6 ft 1 in (1.85 m)	167 lb (76 kg)	Fr	St. Charles, MO
2	INF	Landon Lucansky	R/R	5 ft 11 in (1.8 m)	183 lb (83 kg)	Fr	Leawood, KS
28	INF	Conner Mach	R/R	6 ft 0 in (1.83 m)	189 lb (86 kg)	Sr	Chesterfield, MO
3	INF	Michael McGraw	R/R	6 ft 2 in (1.88 m)	209 lb (95 kg)	So	Newnan, GA
41	RHP	John Miles	R/R	6 ft 3 in (1.91 m)	197 lb (89 kg)	Fr	Columbia, MO
27	INF	Nick Moore	R/R	5 ft 10 in (1.78 m)	170 lb (77 kg)	Fr	Downers Grove, IL
4	INF	Case Munson	R/R	5 ft 11 in (1.8 m)	183 lb (83 kg)	Fr	St. Charles, MO
47	OF	Dane Opel	L/L	6 ft 2 in (1.88 m)	190 lb (86 kg)	Jr	Edwardsville, IL
55	INF	Andreas Plackis	R/R	6 ft 0 in (1.83 m)	203 lb (92 kg)	RS Jr	St. Charles, MO
11	RHP	Brandon Platts	R/R	6 ft 3 in (1.91 m)	197 lb (89 kg)	Fr	Mason City, IA
36	C	Patrick Quintanilla	R/R	6 ft 1 in (1.85 m)	188 lb (85 kg)	Fr	Southlake, TX
17	RHP	Dusty Ross	R/R	6 ft 3 in (1.91 m)	212 lb (96 kg)	Sr	Iowa Park, TX
49	INF	Scott Sommerfeld	R/R	6 ft 0 in (1.83 m)	190 lb (86 kg)	Jr	Manchester, MO
30	INF	Gavin Stark	R/R	6 ft 4 in (1.93 m)	220 lb (100 kg)	Jr	Lees Summit, MO
42	RHP	Brett Thomas	R/R	6 ft 2 in (1.88 m)	223 lb (101 kg)	Fr	Oak Ridge, MO
18	C	Ben Turner	R/R	6 ft 4 in (1.93 m)	220 lb (100 kg)	Sr	St. Charles, MO
52	LHP	Jake Walsh	L/L	6 ft 3 in (1.91 m)	189 lb (86 kg)	RS So	Dallas, TX
12	RHP	Ryan Yuengel	R/R	6 ft 3 in (1.91 m)	187 lb (85 kg)	RS Fr	Festus, MO
8	LHP	Rob Zastryzny	L/L	6 ft 3 in (1.91 m)	193 lb (88 kg)	So	Corpus Christi, TX

Head coach

29 Steve Bieser (1st year)

Assistant coach(es)

51 Kerrick Jackson (2nd year)
38 Matt Hobbs (2nd year)

Legend

- (C) Team captain
- (S) Suspended
- (I) Ineligible
- Injured
- Current redshirt

=== Schedule ===
2012 Missouri Tigers baseball game log
Regular season
February

Date	Opponent	Site/stadium	Score	MU Decision	Attendance	Overall record	Big 12 record
February 17	at Auburn	Plainsman Park	2–5	Anderson (L; 0–1)	3,577	0–1	–
February 19	at Auburn	Plainsman Park	6–4	Emens (W; 1–0)	2,406	1–1	–
February 19	at Auburn	Plainsman Park	4–3	Ross (W; 1–0)	2,598	2–1	–
February 24	at San Francisco	Benedetti Diamond	1–3	Anderson (L; 0–2)	147	2–2	–
February 25	at San Francisco	Benedetti Diamond	1–3	Zastryzny (L; 0–1)	225	2–3	–
February 26	at San Francisco	Benedetti Diamond	0–6	Cline (L; 0–1)	220	2–4	–

March

Date	Opponent	Site/stadium	Score	MU Decision	Attendance	Overall record	Big 12 record
March 2	Ball State	Taylor Stadium	2–5	Anderson (L; 0–3)	524	2–5	–
March 3	Ball State	Taylor Stadium	15–5	Zastryzny (W; 1–1)	1,314	3–5	–
March 4	Ball State	Taylor Stadium	9–2	Holovach (W; 1–0)	1,249	4–5	–
March 6	Nebraska–Omaha	Taylor Stadium	14–4	Graves (W; 1–0)	543	5–5	–
March 9	Charlotte	Taylor Stadium	10–4	Emens (W; 2–0)	539	6–5	–
March 10	Charlotte	Taylor Stadium	5–3	Zastryzny (W; 2–1)	744	7–5	–
March 10	Charlotte	Taylor Stadium	3–2	Holovach (W; 2–0)	744	8–5	–
March 13	North Dakota	Taylor Stadium	10–7	Miles (W; 1–0)	502	9–5	–
March 13	North Dakota	Taylor Stadium	21–5	Yuengel (W; 1–0)	482	10–5	–
March 16	High Point	Taylor Stadium	8–7	Walsh (W; 1–0)	451	11–5	–
March 17	High Point	Taylor Stadium	4–0	Holovach (W; 3–0)	434	12–5	–
March 18	High Point	Taylor Stadium	7–13	Platts (L; 0–1)	4,088	12–6	–
March 21	Indiana State	Taylor Stadium	1–15	Graves (L; 1–1)	159	12–7	–
March 24	Oklahoma State	Taylor Stadium	2–3	Walsh (L; 1–1)	1,032	12–8	0–1
March 24	Oklahoma State	Taylor Stadium	4–1	Holovach (W; 4–0)	1,032	13–8	1–1
March 25	Oklahoma State	Taylor Stadium	4–2	Emens (W; 3–0)	1,072	14–8	2–1
March 27	Central Arkansas	Taylor Stadium	12–7	Barbeck (W; 1–0)	383	15–8	–
March 28	Central Arkansas	Taylor Stadium	2–8	Graves (L; 1–2)	370	15–9	–
March 30	at Texas A&M	Olsen Field	6–8	Miles (L; 1–1)	4,498	15–10	2–2
March 31	at Texas A&M	Olsen Field	4–3	Holovach (W; 5–0)	5,535	16–10	3–2

April

Date	Opponent	Site/stadium	Score	MU Decision	Attendance	Overall record	Big 12 record
April 1	at Texas A&M	Olsen Field	6–7	Graves (L; 1–3)	3,947	16–11	3–3
April 5	Baylor	Taylor Stadium	1–3	Zastryzny (L; 2–2)	486	16–12	3–4
April 6	Baylor	Taylor Stadium	3–5	Holovach (L; 5–1)	1,003	16–13	3–5
April 7	Baylor	Taylor Stadium	7–12	Walsh (L; 1–2)	677	16–14	3–6
April 10	Arkansas-Little Rock	Taylor Stadium	10–5	Walsh (W; 2–2)	360	17–14	–
April 11	Illinois	Busch Stadium	5–4	Graves (W; 2–3)	1,399	18–14	–
April 13	at Oklahoma	Mitchell Park	5–6	Emens (L; 3–1)	622	18–15	3–7
April 14	at Oklahoma	Mitchell Park	4–8	Holovach (L; 5–2)	1,146	18–16	3–8
April 15	at Oklahoma	Mitchell Park	4–5	Graves (L; 2–4)	930	18–17	3–9
April 20	Kansas State	Taylor Stadium	13–4	Zastryzny (W; 3–2)	584	19–17	4–9
April 21	Kansas State	Taylor Stadium	4–3	Ross (W; 2–0)	2,049	20–17	5–9
April 22	Kansas State	Taylor Stadium	7–0	Graves (W; 3–4)	752	21–17	6–9
April 25	at Missouri State	Hammons Field	4–3	Miles (W; 2–1)	2,540	22–17	–
April 27	at Texas Tech	Dan Law Field	9–0	Zastryzny (W; 4–2)	2,856	23–17	7–9
April 28	at Texas Tech	Dan Law Field	3–4	Holovach (L; 5–3)	3,224	23–18	7–10
April 29	at Texas Tech	Dan Law Field	0–7	Graves (L; 3–5)	3,018	23–19	8–10

May

Date	Opponent	Site/stadium	Score	MU Decision	Attendance	Overall record	Big 12 record
May 1	at Arkansas	Baum Stadium	3–6	Holovach (L; 5–4)	7,051	23–20	–
May 2	at Arkansas	Baum Stadium	0–2	Walsh (L; 2–3)	6,840	23–21	–
May 4	Texas	Taylor Stadium	4–6	Zastryzny (L; 4–3)	1,387	23–22	8–11
May 5	Texas	Taylor Stadium	5–4	Ross (W; 3–0)	2,210	24–22	8–12
May 6	Texas	Taylor Stadium	7–6	Graves (W; 4–5)	1,140	25–22	9–12
May 9	Missouri State	Taylor Stadium	10–5	Yuengel (W; 2–0)	1,004	26–22	–
May 11	Memphis	Taylor Stadium	4–6	Zastryzny (L; 4–4)	886	26–23	–
May 12	Memphis	Taylor Stadium	9–1	Miles (W; 3–1	779	27–23	–
May 13	Memphis	Taylor Stadium	7–8	Ross (L; 3–1)	3,299	27–24	–
May 17	Kansas	Taylor Stadium	0–1	Zastryzny (L; 4–5)	1,209	27–25	9–13
May 18	Kansas	Taylor Stadium	3–6	Miles (L; 3–2)	1,510	27–26	9–14
May 18	Kansas	Taylor Stadium	6–3	Holovach (W; 6–4)	1,536	28–26	10–14

Postseason
Big 12 Tournament

Date	Opponent	Site/stadium	Score	MU Decision	Attendance	Overall record
May 23	vs. Texas	Chickasaw Bricktown Ballpark	5–0	Zastryzny (W; 5–5)	3,853	29–26
May 24	vs. Texas A&M	Chickasaw Bricktown Ballpark	5–3	Holovach (W; 7–4)	4,285	30–26
May 26	vs. Kansas	Chickasaw Bricktown Ballpark	12–2	Emens (W; 4–1)	5,299	31–26
May 23	vs. Oklahoma	Chickasaw Bricktown Ballpark	8–7	Ross W; 4–1)	6,343	32–26

NCAA tournament: Tucson Regional

Date	Opponent	Site/stadium	Score	MU Decision	Attendance	Overall record
June 1	vs. Arizona	Hi Corbett Field	3–15	Holovach (L; 7–5)	5,086	32–27
June 2	vs. New Mexico State	Hi Corbett Field	6–2	Emens (W; 5–1)	451	33–27
June 3	vs. Louisville	Hi Corbett Field	3–11	Ross (L; 4–2)	1,430	33–28

=== Awards and honors ===
Blake Brown

- All-Big 12 Honorable Mention
- All-Big 12 Tournament Team

Jeff Emens

- All-Big 12 Tournament Team

Eric Garcia

- Big 12 Tournament Most Outstanding Player

Blake Holovach

- Big 12 Newcomer of the Week (3/26)

John Miles

- Big 12 Newcomer of the Week (5/7)

Dane Opel

- All-Big 12 Honorable Mention
- All-Big 12 Tournament Team
- Big 12 Player of the Week (2/20)

Dusty Ross

- All-Big 12 Second Team

Ben Turner

- All-Big 12 Honorable Mention

Rob Zastryzny

- All-Big 12 Honorable Mention
- Big 12 Pitcher of the Week (4/30)

=== Tigers in the 2012 MLB draft ===
The following members of the Missouri Tigers baseball program were drafted in the 2012 Major League Baseball draft.

Player	Position	Round	Overall	MLB team
Blake Brown	OF	5th	178th	Atlanta Braves
Eric Garcia	SS	20th	629th	Atlanta Braves
Ben Turner	C	21st	658th	San Francisco Giants
Blake Holovach	LHP	27th	821st	Seattle Mariners

== 2013 ==
2013 Missouri Tigers baseball
- Conference: Southeastern Conference
- Record: 18–32 (10–20 SEC)
- Head coach: Tim Jamieson (19th year)
- Assistant coach: Kerrick Jackson (3rd year); Matt Hobbs (3rd year)
- Home stadium: Taylor Stadium

2013 Southeastern Conference baseball standings
	Conf.				Overall
Team	W		L	PCT	W		L	PCT
Eastern
No. 9 Vanderbilt ^{x}‍†‍‍^{y}	26	–	3	.897	54	–	12	.818
No. 13 South Carolina ‍‍‍^{y}	17	–	12	.586	43	–	20	.683
Florida ‍‍‍^{y}	14	–	16	.467	29	–	30	.492
Kentucky ‍‍‍	11	–	19	.367	30	–	25	.545
Missouri ‍‍‍	10	–	20	.333	18	–	32	.360
Tennessee ‍‍‍	8	–	20	.286	22	–	30	.423
Georgia ‍‍‍	7	–	20	.259	21	–	32	.396
Western
No. 7 LSU ^{x}‍‍‡‍^{y}	23	–	7	.767	57	–	11	.838
No. 18 Arkansas ‍‍‍^{y}	18	–	11	.621	39	–	22	.639
No. 2 Mississippi State ‍‍‍^{y}	16	–	14	.533	51	–	20	.718
Ole Miss ‍‍‍^{y}	15	–	15	.500	38	–	24	.613
Alabama ‍‍‍^{y}	14	–	15	.483	35	–	28	.556
Texas A&M ‍‍‍^{y}	13	–	16	.448	34	–	29	.540
Auburn ‍‍‍	13	–	17	.433	33	–	23	.589
x – Division champion † – Conference champion ‡ – Tournament champion y – Invited to the NCAA tournament As of June 26, 2013; Rankings from Collegiate Baseball

=== Schedule and results ===
2013 Missouri Tigers baseball game log
Regular season (18–31)

February (0–6)
Date	Opponent	Rank	Site/stadium	Score	Win	Loss	Save	TV	Attendance	Overall record	SEC record
Feb. 15	at Southern Miss*		Pete Taylor Park; Hattiesburg, MS	**L** 2–5	Pierce (1–0)	**Zastryzny** (0–1)			3,517	0–1	
Feb. 16	at Southern Miss*		Pete Taylor Park	**L** 3–5	Giannini (1–0)	**Yuengel** (0–1)	Roney (1)		3,529	0–2	
Feb. 17	at Southern Miss*		Pete Taylor Park	**L** 1–6	Myrick (1–0)	**Miles** (0–1)			3,424	0–3	
Feb. 22	at Memphis*		FedExPark; Memphis, TN	**L** 0–6	Moll (1–1)	**Zastryzny** (0–2)			568	0–4	
Feb. 23	at Memphis*		FedExPark	**L** 3–5	Hatfield (1–0)	**Graves** (0–1)			606	0–5	
Feb. 24	at Memphis*		FedExPark	**L** 2–8	Reed (2–0)	**Rash** (0–1)			352	0–6	

March (9–9)
Date	Opponent	Rank	Site/stadium	Score	Win	Loss	Save	TV	Attendance	Overall record	SEC record
Mar. 1	Northwestern*		Taylor Stadium; Columbia, MO	**Canceled**							
Mar. 2	Northwestern*		Taylor Stadium	**Canceled**							
Mar. 3	Northwestern*		Taylor Stadium	**Canceled**							
Mar. 3	Eastern Michigan*		Taylor Stadium	**Canceled**							
Mar. 6	Eastern Michigan*		Taylor Stadium	**W** 1–0^{7}	**James** (1–0)	Valente (0–1)	**Williams** (1)			1–6	
Mar. 6	Eastern Michigan*		Taylor Stadium	**W** 7–1	**Steele** (1–0)	Marsinek (0–1)			227	2–6	
Mar. 8	San Francisco*		Taylor Stadium	**W** 6–2	**Zastryzny** (1–2)	Bobb (0–4)			480	3–6	
Mar. 9	San Francisco*		Taylor Stadium	**L** 3–8	Hinkle (3–0)	**Williams** (0–1)			554	3–7	
Mar. 10	San Francisco*		Taylor Stadium	**Canceled**							
Mar. 12	Jackson State*		Taylor Stadium	**W** 9–3	**Rash** (1–1)	Wingard (0–2)			123	4–7	
Mar. 13	Truman State*		Taylor Stadium	**W** 14–4	**Goodrich** (1–0)	McCreary (0–4)			431	5–7	
Mar. 15	South Carolina		Taylor Stadium	**L** 1–4	Beal (2–0)	Zastryzny (1–3)	Webb (6)		3,145	5–8	0–1
Mar. 16	South Carolina		Taylor Stadium	**L** 0–2	Belcher (4–1)	**Graves** (0–2)	Webb (7)			5–9	0–2
Mar. 16	South Carolina		Taylor Stadium	**W** 4–0	**Steele** (2–0)	Holmes (1–2)			826	6–9	1–2
Mar. 19	Arkansas State*		Taylor Stadium	**W** 5–1	**James** (2–0)	Birginske			400	7–9	
Mar. 19	Arkansas State*		Taylor Stadium	**L** 3–10	Ring (1–0)	**Miles** (0–2)			400	7–10	
Mar. 22	at Tennessee		Lindsey Nelson Stadium; Knoxville, TN	**L** 0–4	Godley (2–2)	**Zastryzny** (1–4)			1,393	7–11	1–3
Mar. 23	at Tennessee		Lindsey Nelson Stadium	**L** 6–7	Owenby (2–0)	**Williams** (0–2)				7–12	1–4
Mar. 23	at Tennessee		Lindsey Nelson Stadium	**W** 14–6	**Rash** (2–1)	Bettencourt (2–2)			1,560	8–12	2–4
Mar. 27	Omaha*		Taylor Stadium	**W** 11–4	**Goodrich** (2–0)	Fox (1–1)			127	9–12	
Mar. 29	No. 3 LSU		Taylor Stadium	**L** 0–2	Nola (4–0)	**Zastryzny** (1–5)	Cotton (7)		1,263	9–13	2–5
Mar. 30	No. 3 LSU		Taylor Stadium	**L** 0–8	Eades (6–0)	**Graves** (0–3)			945	9–14	2–6
Mar. 31	No. 3 LSU		Taylor Stadium	**L** 5–6	Bonvillain (2–0)	**Steele** (2–1)	Cotton (8)		1,107	9–15	2–7

April (6–10)
Date	Opponent	Rank	Site/stadium	Score	Win	Loss	Save	TV	Attendance	Overall record	SEC record
Apr. 2	vs. Illinois*		Busch Stadium; St. Louis, MO	**L** 2–6	Duchene (4–0)	**James** (2–1)			625	9–16	
Apr. 5	Georgia		Foley Field; Athens, GA	**W** 4–0	**Zastryzny** (2–5)	Boling (2–4)			2,236	10–16	3–7
Apr. 6	Georgia		Foley Field	**L** 5–6	McLaughlin (4–2)	**Graves** (0–4)	Cole (3)		2,679	10–17	3–8
Apr. 7	Georgia		Foley Field	**W** 8–5	**Steele** (3–1)	Dieterich (1–1)			2,055	11–17	4–8
Apr. 9	at Missouri State*		Hammons Field; Springfield, MO	**W** 5–4	**James** (3–1)	Cheray (0–1)	**Miles** (1)		2,105	12–17	
Apr. 12	No. 3 Vanderbilt		Hawkins Field; Nashville, TN	**L** 5–11	Ziomek (7–1)	**Zastryzny** (2–6)			2,856	12–18	4–9
Apr. 13	No. 3 Vanderbilt		Hawkins Field	**L** 1–12	Beede (9–0)	**Graves** (0–5)			3,365	12–19	4–10
Apr. 14	No. 3 Vanderbilt		Hawkins Field	**L** 4–16	Pecoraro (1–0)	**Steele** (3–2)			3,109	12–20	4–11
Apr. 17	Missouri State*		Taylor Stadium	**Canceled**							
Apr. 19	No. 19 Florida		Taylor Stadium	**L** 6–8	Crawford (3–5)	**Zastryzny** (2–7)	Magliozzi (10)		840	12–21	4–12
Apr. 20	No. 19 Florida		Taylor Stadium	**L** 3–4^{15}	Poyner (2–0)	**Anderson** (0–1)	Magliozzi (11)		2,563	12–22	4–13
Apr. 21	No. 19 Florida		Taylor Stadium	**W** 8–2	**Walsh** (1–0)	Simpson (1–2)	**Miles** (2)		1,018	13–22	5–13
Apr. 23	Murray State*		Taylor Stadium	**Canceled**							
Apr. 24	Missouri State*		Taylor Stadium	**L** 2–4	Hall (4–1)	**James** (3–2)	Gordon (2)		306	13–23	
Apr. 26	Auburn		Taylor Stadium	**L** 1–3	Kendrick (3–2)	**Zastryzny** (2–8)	Dedrick (5)		291	13–24	5–14
Apr. 28	Auburn		Taylor Stadium	**W** 3–1^{7}	**Steele** (4–2)	O'Neal (8–3)			879	14–24	6–14
Apr. 28	Auburn		Taylor Stadium	**W** 4–1^{7}	**Graves** (1–5)	Camp (4–1)	**Anderson** (1)		879	15–24	7–14
Apr.	Southeast Missouri State*		Taylor Stadium	**L** 7–9	Hurst (3–2)	**Williams** (0–3)			750	15–25	

May (3–6)
Date	Opponent	Rank	Site/stadium	Score	Win	Loss	Save	TV	Attendance	Overall record	SEC record
May 3	at Texas A&M		Blue Bell Park; College Station, TX	**L** 1–2	Mengden (5–3)	**Zastryzny** (2–9)	Jester (11)		4,164	15–26	7–15
May 4	at Texas A&M		Blue Bell Park	**L** 5–6	Vinson (1–1)	**Steele** (4–3)			5,114	15–27	7–16
May 5	at Texas A&M		Blue Bell Park	**L** 1–4	Pineda (5–4)	**Anderson** (0–2)	Jester (12)		4,303	15–28	7–17
May 10	at Alabama		Sewell–Thomas Stadium; Tuscaloosa, AL	**L** 7–9	Sullivan (5–4)	**Anderson** (0–3)	Castillo (9)		2,976	15–29	7–18
May 11	at Alabama		Sewell–Thomas Stadium	**W** 7–3	**Steele** (5–3)	Turnbull (4–3)			3,018	16–29	8–18
May 12	at Alabama		Sewell–Thomas Stadium	**L** 6–7	Greer (2–1)	**Walsh** (1–1)			3,213	16–30	8–19
May 16	Kentucky		Taylor Stadium	**W** 4–2	**Graves** (2–5)	Reed (2–8)	**Steele** (1)		654	17–30	9–19
May 17	Kentucky		Taylor Stadium	**W** 4–3	**Walsh** (2–1)	Wijas (2–1)	**Steele** (2)		850	18–30	10–19
May 18	Kentucky		Taylor Stadium	**L** 1–5	Littrell (6–5)	**Miles** (0–3)			886	18–31	10–20

Postseason (0–1)

SEC Tournament (0–1)
Date	Opponent(Seed)	Rank(Seed)	Site/stadium	Score	Win	Loss	Save	TV	Attendance	Overall record	SEC record
May 21	vs. No. 18 Mississippi State (5)	(12)	Hoover Metropolitan Stadium; Hoover, AL	**L** 1–2^{17}	Cox (3–1)	**Walsh** (2–2)			5,404	18–32	0–1

Legend: = Win = Loss = Canceled
Bold = Missouri team member
Rankings are based on the team's current ranking in the Collegiate Baseball poll.

=== Record vs. conference opponents ===
Last two do not qualify for conf. tourn. Blank are not scheduled. Blue are home games, otherwise away.

2013 SEC baseball records Source: 2013 SEC baseball game results, 2013 SEC baseball schedule
Team	W–L	ALA	ARK	AUB	FLA	UGA	KEN	LSU	MSU	MIZZ	MISS	SCAR	TENN	TAMU	VAN	Team	Div	SR	SW
ALA	14–15		1–2	2–1	.	3–0	.	1–2	0–3	2–1	0–3	.	2–1	2–0	1–2	ALA	W5	5–5	1–2
ARK	18–11	2–1		1–2	.	2–0	2–1	1–2	2–1	.	1–2	3–0	2–1	2–1	.	ARK	W2	7–3	1–0
AUB	13–17	1–2	2–1		2–1	2–1	.	0–3	1–2	1–2	2–1	.	.	2–1	0–3	AUB	W7	5–5	0–2
FLA	14–16	.	.	1–2		1–2	1–2	0–3	1–2	2–1	2–1	3–0	2–1	.	1–2	FLA	E3	4–6	1–1
UGA	7–20	0–3	0–2	1–2	2–1		1–2	.	.	1–2	.	0–3	1–0	0–3	1–2	UGA	E7	1–8	0–3
KEN	11–19	.	1–2	.	2–1	2–1		0–3	2–1	1–2	2–1	0–3	1–2	.	0–3	KEN	E4	4–6	0–3
LSU	23–7	2–1	2–1	3–0	3–0	.	3–0		2–1	3–0	2–1	1–2	.	2–1	.	LSU	W1	9–1	4–0
MSU	16–14	3–0	1–2	2–1	2–1	.	1–2	1–2		.	1–2	2–1	.	3–0	0–3	MSU	W3	5–5	2–1
MIZZ	10–20	1–2	.	2–1	1–2	2–1	2–1	0–3	.		.	1–2	1–2	0–3	0–3	MIZZ	E5	3–7	0–3
MISS	15–15	3–0	2–1	1–2	1–2	.	1–2	1–2	2–1	.		.	3–0	1–2	0–3	MISS	W4	4–6	2–1
SCAR	17–12	.	0–3	.	0–3	3–0	3–0	2–1	1–2	2–1	.		3–0	3–0	0–2	SCAR	E2	6–4	4–2
TENN	8–20	1–2	1–2	.	1–2	0–1	2–1	.	.	2–1	0–3	0–3		1–2	0–3	TENN	E6	2–7	0–3
TAMU	13–16	0–2	1–2	1–2	.	3–0	.	1–2	0–3	3–0	2–1	0–3	2–1		.	TAMU	W6	4–6	2–2
VAN	26–3	2–1	.	3–0	2–1	2–1	3–0	.	3–0	3–0	3–0	2–0	3–0	.		VAN	E1	10–0	6–0
Team	W–L	ALA	ARK	AUB	FLA	UGA	KEN	LSU	MSU	MIZZ	MISS	SCAR	TENN	TAMU	VAN	Team	Div	SR	SW

Updated for entire regular season.

== 2014 ==
2014 Missouri Tigers baseball
- Conference: Southeastern Conference
- Record: 20–33 (6–24 SEC)
- Head coach: Tim Jamieson (20th year)
- Assistant coach: Kerrick Jackson (4th year); Matt Hobbs (4th year)
- Home stadium: Taylor Stadium

2014 Southeastern Conference baseball standings
	Conf.						Overall
Team	W		L		T	PCT	W		L		T	PCT
Eastern
No. 24 Florida ^{x}‍†‍‍^{y}	21	–	9	–	0	.700	40	–	23	–	0	.635
No. 25 South Carolina ‍‍‍^{y}	18	–	12	–	0	.600	44	–	18	–	0	.710
No. 1 Vanderbilt ‍‍‍^{y}	17	–	13	–	0	.567	51	–	21	–	0	.708
Kentucky ‍‍‍^{y}	14	–	16	–	0	.467	37	–	25	–	0	.597
Tennessee ‍‍‍	12	–	18	–	0	.400	31	–	23	–	0	.574
Georgia ‍‍‍	11	–	18	–	1	.383	26	–	29	–	1	.473
Missouri ‍‍‍	6	–	24	–	0	.200	20	–	33	–	0	.377
Western
No. 4 Ole Miss ^{x}‍‍‍^{y}	19	–	11	–	0	.633	48	–	21	–	0	.696
No. 21 LSU ‍‍‡‍^{y}	17	–	11	–	1	.603	46	–	16	–	1	.738
No. 28 Mississippi State ‍‍‍^{y}	18	–	12	–	0	.600	39	–	24	–	0	.619
No. 30 Arkansas ‍‍‍^{y}	16	–	14	–	0	.533	40	–	25	–	0	.615
Alabama ‍‍‍^{y}	15	–	14	–	0	.517	37	–	24	–	0	.607
Texas A&M ‍‍‍^{y}	14	–	16	–	0	.467	36	–	26	–	0	.581
Auburn ‍‍‍	10	–	20	–	0	.333	28	–	28	–	0	.500
x – Division champion † – Conference champion ‡ – Tournament champion y – Invited to the NCAA tournament Rankings from Collegiate Baseball

=== Schedule and results ===
2014 Missouri Tigers baseball game log
Regular season (20–33)

February (3–5)
Date	Opponent	Rank	Site/stadium	Score	Win	Loss	Save	TV	Attendance	Overall record	SEC record
Feb. 15	vs. Southern Miss*		Joe Miller Ballpark; Lake Charles, LA	**W** 4–2	**Phillips** (1–0)	Myrick (0–1)	**Steele** (1)			1–0	
Feb. 15	vs. McNeese State*		Joe Miller Ballpark	**L** 2–3	Clemens (1–0)	**Graves** (0–1)	Fontenot (1)			1–1	
Feb. 16	vs. Chicago State*		Joe Miller Ballpark	**W** 6–3	**Phillips** (2–0)	Wellwerts (0–1)	**Steele** (2)			2–1	
Feb. 21	vs. Radford*		David F. Couch Ballpark; Winston-Salem, NC	**W** 15–3	**Miles** (1–0)	Boyle (0–2)			91	3–1	
Feb. 22	vs. Wake Forest*		David F. Couch Ballpark	**L** 0–1	Fossas (2–0)	**Steele** (0–1)			681	3–2	
Feb. 23	vs. Cincinnati*		David F. Couch Ballpark	**L** 5–11	Walsh (1–0)	**Farbanks** (0–1)			93	3–3	
Feb. 25	vs. Liberty*		USA Baseball National Training Complex; Cary, NC	**L** 1–2	Fulghum (1–1)	**Phillips** (2–1)	Perritt (3)		28	3–4	
Feb. 26	vs. Campbell*		USA Baseball National Training Complex	**L** 3–6	Bowers (3–0)	**Anderson** (0–1)			27	3–5	

March (10–8)
Date	Opponent	Rank	Site/stadium	Score	Win	Loss	Save	TV	Attendance	Overall record	SEC record
Mar. 1	vs. Purdue Fort Wayne*		Gary Hogan Field; Little Rock, AR	**L** 8–11	Kimball	**Williams** (0–1)				3–6	
Mar. 1	vs. UIC*		Gary Hogan	**W** 4–0	**Graves** (1–1)	Lewandowski (1–2)			69	4–6	
Mar. 4	Alabama A&M*		Taylor Stadium; Columbia, MO	**Canceled**							
Mar. 5	Alabama A&M*		Taylor Stadium	**Canceled**							
Mar. 7	Southern Miss*		Taylor Stadium	**W** 4–1	**Graves** (2–1)	Fisk (1–1)	**Steele** (3)		1,028	5–6	
Mar. 8	Southern Miss*		Taylor Stadium	**W** 6–4	**Miles** (2–0)	Glasshof (1–1)	**Steele** (4)		368	6–6	
Mar. 9	Southern Miss*		Taylor Stadium	**L** 1–2	Giannini (1–1)	**Anderson** (0–2)	Roney (2)		588	6–7	
Mar. 11	Alcorn State*		Taylor Stadium	**W** 11–5	**Goodrich** (1–0)	Laird (0–4)			582	7–7	
Mar. 11	Alcorn State*		Taylor Stadium	**W** 5–0	**Fairbanks** (1–1)	Morales (0–3)			582	8–7	
Mar. 12	Alcorn State*		Taylor Stadium	**Canceled**							
Mar. 14	No. 17 Tennessee		Taylor Stadium	**W** 5–2	**Graves** (3–1)	Lenstrohm (1–1)	**Steele** (5)		1,303	9–7	1–0
Mar. 15	No. 17 Tennessee		Taylor Stadium	**L** 1–5	Tribby	**Miles** (2–1)			1,416	9–8	1–1
Mar. 15	No. 17 Tennessee		Taylor Stadium	**L** 1–4	Owenby (0–2)	**Steele** (0–2)			1,416	9–9	1–2
Mar. 18	Milwaukee*		Taylor Stadium	**W** 7–5	**Goodrich** (2–0)	Keller (0–3)	**Williams** (1)		360	10–9	
Mar. 19	Milwaukee*		Taylor Stadium	**W** 4–3	**Fairbanks** (2–1)	Langley (0–1)	**Williams** (2)		276	11–9	
Mar. 21	at No. 16 Ole Miss		Swayze Field; Oxford, MS	**L** 3–4	Ellis (4–0)	**Miles** (2–2)	Laxer (3)		9,651	11–10	1–3
Mar. 22	at No. 16 Ole Miss		Swayze Field	**L** 1–7	Trent (3–0)	**Fairbanks** (2–2)	Greenwood (1)		8,149	11–11	1–4
Mar. 23	at No. 16 Ole Miss		Swayze Field	**L** 3–8	Short (3–0)	**Steele** (0–3)			6,918	11–12	1–5
Mar. 27	at No. 20 Auburn		Plainsman Park; Auburn, AL	**W** 4–3	**Tribby** (1–0)	Ortman (5–2)	**Steele** (6)		4,096	12–12	2–5
Mar. 28	at No. 20 Auburn		Plainsman Park	**W** 4–2	**Williams** (1–1)	Camp (1–4)	**Steele** (7)		3,137	13–12	3–5
Mar. 29	at No. 20 Auburn		Plainsman Park	**L** 3–7	O'Neal (2–2)	**Graves** (3–2)	Wade (1)		3,878	13–13	3–6

Apr. (7–11)
Date	Opponent	Rank	Site/stadium	Score	Win	Loss	Save	TV	Attendance	Overall record	SEC record
Apr. 1	vs. Southern Illinois*		Lou Brock Sports Complex; St. Charles, MO	**L** 2–4	Weld (3–0)	**Steele** (0–4)			47	13–14	
Apr. 4	Georgia		Taylor Stadium	**L** 1–2^{13}	Cheek (0–5)	**Steele** (0–5)			846	13–15	3–7
Apr. 5	Georgia		Taylor Stadium	**L** 2–7	Tyler (3–2)	**Miles** (2–3)			2,328	13–16	3–8
Apr. 6	Georgia		Taylor Stadium	**W** 4–2	**Anderson** (1–2)	Brown (1–1)			876	14–16	4–8
Apr. 8	Missouri State*		Taylor Stadium	**W** 9–4	**Fairbanks** (3–2)	Powers (1–3)			580	15–16	
Apr. 11	at No. 18 Kentucky		Cliff Hagan Stadium; Lexington, KY	**W** 8–7	**Williams** (2–1)	Jack (1–1)	**Steele** (8)		1,950	16–16	5–8
Apr. 12	at No. 18 Kentucky		Cliff Hagan Stadium	**L** 0–12	Dwyer (4–1)	**Miles** (2–4)			2,458	16–17	5–9
Apr. 13	at No. 18 Kentucky		Cliff Hagan Stadium	**W** 8–3	**Anderson** (2–2)	Nelson (1–3)	**Steele** (9)		2,063	17–17	6–9
Apr. 15	at Missouri State*		Hammons Field; Springfield, MO	**L** 0–9	Cheray (1–0)	**Fairbanks** (3–3)			2,485	17–18	
Apr. 18	No. 22 Mississippi State		Taylor Stadium	**L** 2–3^{11}	Holder (4–1)	**Steele** (0–6)			1,066	17–19	6–10
Apr. 19	No. 22 Mississippi State		Taylor Stadium	**L** 2–6	Mitchell (6–3)	**Miles** (2–5)			1,845	17–20	6–11
Apr. 20	No. 22 Mississippi State		Taylor Stadium	**L** 7–9^{11}	Bracewell (3–3)	**Fairbanks** (3–4)	Lindgren (3)		828	17–21	6–12
Apr. 22	vs. Wichita State*		Kauffman Stadium; Kansas City, MO	**W** 5–4	**Williams** (3–1)	Palmer (0–3)			1,613	18–21	
Apr. 23	vs. Illinois*		Busch Stadium; St. Louis, MO	**W** 5–2	**Fairbanks** (4–4)	Sedlock (1–3)			1,234	19–21	
Apr. 25	at No. 9 Florida		Alfred A. McKethan Stadium; Gainesville, FL	**L** 1–7	Shore (5–2)	**Graves** (3–3)			3,744	19–22	6–13
Apr. 26	at No. 9 Florida		Alfred A. McKethan Stadium	**L** 0–5	Rhodes (5–2)	**Anderson** (2–3)			2,925	19–23	6–14
Apr. 27	at No. 9 Florida		Alfred A. McKethan Stadium	**L** 5–6^{10}	Poyner (4–3)	**Fairbanks** (4–5)			3,669	19–24	6–15
Apr. 29	Southeast Missouri State*		Taylor Stadium	**W** 6–5^{11}	**Schwaab** (1–0)	Mosel (2–3)			237	20–24	

May (0–9)
Date	Opponent	Rank	Site/stadium	Score	Win	Loss	Save	TV	Attendance	Overall record	SEC record
May 2	No. 25 Vanderbilt		Taylor Stadium	**L** 3–8	Beede (7–5)	**Graves** (3–4)			1,057	20–25	6–16
May 3	No. 25 Vanderbilt		Taylor Stadium	**L** 1–5	Fulmer (3–1)	**Miles** (2–6)	Stone (2)		1,846	20–26	6–17
May 4	No. 25 Vanderbilt		Taylor Stadium	**L** 1–3	Ravenelle (3–0)	**Steele** (0–7)	Miller (5)		1,427	20–27	6–18
May 9	at No. 19 South Carolina		Carolina Stadium; Columbia, SC	**L** 2–8	Montgomery (–)	**Graves** (3–5)			7,419	20–28	6–19
May 10	at No. 19 South Carolina		Carolina Stadium	**L** 1–3	Wynkoop (7–3)	**Fairbanks** (4–6)	Seddon (14)		7,903	20–29	6–20
May 11	at No. 19 South Carolina		Carolina Stadium	**L** 1–2	Mincey (5–0)	**Steele** (0–8)			7,307	20–30	6–21
May 15	Arkansas		Taylor Stadium	**L** 4–9	Killian (3–8)	**Graves** (3–6)			725	20–31	6–22
May 16	Arkansas		Taylor Stadium	**L** 0–4	Oliver (7–4)	**Fairbanks** (4–7)			758	20–32	6–23
May 17	Arkansas		Taylor Stadium	**L** 5–7	Simpson (1–1)	**Schwaab** (1–1)			765	20–33	6–24

Legend: = Win = Loss = Canceled
Bold = Missouri team member
Rankings are based on the team's current ranking in the Collegiate Baseball poll.

=== Record vs. conference opponents ===
Last two do not qualify for conf. tourn. Blank are not scheduled. Blue are home games, otherwise away.

2014 SEC baseball records Source: 2014 SEC baseball game results
Team	W–L	ALA	ARK	AUB	FLA	UGA	KEN	LSU	MSU	MIZZ	MISS	SCAR	TENN	TAMU	VAN	Team	Div	SR	SW
ALA	15–14		1–2	2–1	0–3	.	2–1	1–1	1–2	.	3–0	1–2	2–1	2–1	.	ALA	W5	5–4	1–1
ARK	16–14	2–1		1–2	1–2	.	.	1–2	1–2	3–0	1–2	2–1	.	2–1	2–1	ARK	W4	5–5	1–0
AUB	10–20	1–2	2–1		.	.	1–2	0–3	0–3	1–2	0–3	1–2	2–1	2–1	.	AUB	W7	3–7	0–3
FLA	21–9	3–0	2–1	.		3–0	1–2	3–0	.	3–0	.	2–1	2–1	1–2	1–2	FLA	E1	7–3	4–0
UGA	11–18	.	.	.	0–3		1–2	0–2	1–2	2–1	1–2	2–1	2–1	2–1	0–3	UGA	E6	4–6	0–2
KEN	14–16	1–2	.	2–1	2–1	2–1		.	.	1–2	0–3	2–1	1–2	2–1	1–2	KEN	E4	5–5	0–1
LSU	17–11	1–1	2–1	3–0	0–3	2–0	.		3–0	.	2–1	.	2–1	1–2	1–2	LSU	W2	6–3	2–1
MSU	18–12	2–1	2–1	3–0	.	2–1	.	0–3		3–0	1–2	.	2–1	1–2	2–1	MSU	W3	7–3	2–1
MIZZ	6–24	.	0–3	2–1	0–3	1–2	2–1	.	0–3		0–3	0–3	1–2	.	0–3	MIZZ	E7	2–8	0–6
MISS	19–11	0–3	2–1	3–0	.	2–1	3–0	1–2	2–1	3–0		1–2	.	2–1	.	MISS	W1	7–3	3–1
SCAR	18–12	2–1	1–2	2–1	1–2	1–2	1–2	.	.	3–0	2–1		3–0	.	2–1	SCAR	E2	6–4	2–0
TENN	12–18	1–2	.	1–2	1–2	1–2	2–1	1–2	1–2	2–1	.	0–3		.	2–1	TENN	E5	3–7	0–1
TAMU	14–16	1–2	1–2	1–2	2–1	1–2	1–2	2–1	2–1	.	1–2	.	.		2–1	TAMU	W6	4–6	0–0
VAN	17–13	.	1–2	.	2–1	3–0	2–1	2–1	1–2	3–0	.	1–2	1–2	1–2		VAN	E3	5–5	2–0
Team	W–L	ALA	ARK	AUB	FLA	UGA	KEN	LSU	MSU	MIZZ	MISS	SCAR	TENN	TAMU	VAN	Team	Div	SR	SW

Updated for entire regular season. Georgia at LSU had a tie game.

== 2015 ==
2015 Missouri Tigers baseball
- Conference: Southeastern Conference
- Record: 30–28 (15–15 SEC)
- Head coach: Tim Jamieson (21st year)
- Assistant coach: Kerrick Jackson (5th year); Hunter Mense (1st year)
- Home stadium: Taylor Stadium

2015 Southeastern Conference baseball standings
	Conf.				Overall
Team	W		L	PCT	W		L	PCT
Eastern
No. 2 Vanderbilt ^{x}‍‍‍^{y}	20	–	10	.667	51	–	21	.708
No. 3 Florida ‍‍‡‍^{y}	19	–	11	.633	52	–	18	.743
Missouri ‍‍‍	15	–	15	.500	30	–	28	.517
Kentucky ‍‍‍	14	–	15	.483	30	–	25	.545
South Carolina ‍‍‍	13	–	17	.433	32	–	25	.561
Tennessee ‍‍‍	11	–	18	.379	24	–	26	.480
Georgia ‍‍‍	10	–	19	.345	26	–	28	.481
Western
No. 5 LSU ^{x}‍†‍‍^{y}	21	–	8	.724	54	–	12	.818
No. 11 Texas A&M ‍‍‍^{y}	18	–	10	.643	50	–	14	.781
No. 7 Arkansas ‍‍‍^{y}	17	–	12	.586	40	–	25	.615
Ole Miss ‍‍‍^{y}	15	–	14	.517	30	–	28	.517
Auburn ‍‍‍^{y}	13	–	17	.433	36	–	26	.581
Alabama ‍‍‍	12	–	18	.400	32	–	28	.533
Mississippi State ‍‍‍	8	–	22	.267	24	–	30	.444
x – Division champion † – Conference champion ‡ – Tournament champion y – Invited to the NCAA tournament Rankings from Collegiate Baseball

=== Schedule and results ===
2015 Missouri Tigers baseball game log
Regular season (30–28)

February (9–1)
Date	Opponent	Rank	Site/stadium	Score	Win	Loss	Save	TV	Attendance	Overall record	SEC record
Feb. 13	vs. Iona*		USA Baseball Complex; Cary, NC	**W** 4–3	**Williams** (1–0)	Daddino (0–1)			45	1–0	
Feb. 13	vs. Iona*		USA Baseball Complex	**W** 1–0	**McClain** (1–0)	Macaluso (0–1)	**Williams** (1)		45	2–0	
Feb. 14	vs. Iona*		USA Baseball Complex	**W** 6–3	**Houck** (1–0)	Rivera (0–1)	**Williams** (2)		52	3–0	
Feb. 14	vs. Iona*		USA Baseball Complex	**W** 14–2^{7}	**Rash** (1–0)	Bruckner (0–1)			52	4–0	
Feb. 19	vs. Texas A&M–Corpus Christi*		Whataburger Field; Corpus Christi, TX	**L** 2–3	Harris (2–0)	**Fairbanks** (0–1)	Dorris (3)		2,099	4–1	
Feb. 20	vs. Sam Houston State*		Whataburger Field	**W** 2–0	**McClain** (2–0)	Godail (0–1)				5–1	
Feb. 21	vs. Texas A&M–Corpus Christi*		Whataburger Field	**W** 5–1	**Houck** (2–0)	Belicek (1–1)	**Williams** (3)		2,612	6–1	
Feb. 22	vs. Purdue*		Whataburger Field	**W** 1–0	**Rash** (2–0)	Frawley (0–1)	**Williams** (4)			7–1	
Feb. 28	vs. UIC*		USA Stadium; Millington, TN	**W** 3–2	**Williams** (2–0)	Lewndowski (0–1)			54	8–1	
Feb. 28	vs. UIC*		USA Stadium	**W** 2–1	**Houck** (3–0)	Dahlberg (1–1)	**Williams** (5)		67	9–1	

March (11–9)
Date	Opponent	Rank	Site/stadium	Score	Win	Loss	Save	TV	Attendance	Overall record	SEC record
Mar. 1	vs. UIC*		USA Stadium	**W** 10–1	**Fairbanks** (1–1)	Anderson (1–1)	**Schwaab** (1)		43	10–1	
Mar. 3	vs. Central Arkansas*		Taylor Stadium; Columbia, MO	**Canceled**							
Mar. 4	vs. Central Arkansas*		Taylor Stadium	**Canceled**							
Mar. 6	Milwaukee*		Taylor Stadium	**L** 4–7	Langley (3–0)	**McClain** (2–1)	Peterson (2)		481	10–2	
Mar. 7	Milwaukee*		Taylor Stadium	**L** 1–5	Keller (2–1)	**Houck** (3–1)			847	10–3	
Mar. 8	Milwaukee*		Taylor Stadium	**L** 1–3	Pavlovich (1–0)	**Fairbanks** (1–2)	Peterson (3)		527	10–4	
Mar. 10	Truman State*		Taylor Stadium	**W** 10–2	**Dabney** (1–0)	Lukas (0–1)			644	11–4	
Mar. 11	SIU Edwardsville*		Taylor Stadium	**W** 9–4	**Rash** (3–0)	Miller (0–1)			324	12–4	
Mar. 13	at Georgia		Foley Field; Athens, GA	**Postponed**							
Mar. 14	at Georgia		Foley Field	**W** 5–1	**McClain** (3–1)	Lawlor (2–3)			3,245	13–4	1–0
Mar. 14	at Georgia		Foley Field	**W** 8–4^{10}	**Williams** (3–0)	Cheek (1–1)			3,245	14–4	2–0
Mar. 15	at Georgia		Foley Field	**W** 6–0	**Fairbanks** (2–2)	Sosebee (2–1)			2,367	15–4	3–0
Mar. 17	Air Force*	No. 26	Taylor Stadium	**W** 6–0	**Miles** (1–0)	Holloway (0–2)			622	16–4	
Mar. 18	Air Force*	No. 26	Taylor Stadium	**L** 2–4	Monaghan (3–1)	**James** (0–1)			156	16–5	
Mar. 20	No. 6 South Carolina	No. 26	Taylor Stadium	**W** 3–2	**McClain** (4–1)	Crowe (3–2)	**Williams** (6)		786	17–5	4–0
Mar. 21	No. 6 South Carolina	No. 26	Taylor Stadium	**W** 4–3^{10}	**Williams** (4–0)	Widener (1–1)			2,032	18–5	5–0
Mar. 22	No. 6 South Carolina	No. 26	Taylor Stadium	**L** 5–7	Murray (2–0)	**Tribby** (0–1)	Fiori (2)		1,243	18–6	5–1
Mar. 24	Arkansas–Pine Bluff*	No. 24	Taylor Stadium	**L** 3–8	Olson (4–2)	**Tribby** (0–2)			120	18–7	
Mar. 25	Arkansas–Pine Bluff*	No. 24	Taylor Stadium	**W** 9–3	**Schwaab** (1–0)	Medina (0–2)			184	19–7	
Mar. 27	at No. 1 Texas A&M	No. 24	Olsen Field at Blue Bell Park; College Station, TX	**L** 4–7	Vinson (3–0)	**McClain** (4–2)			7,391	19–8	5–2
Mar. 28	at No. 1 Texas A&M	No. 24	Olsen Field at Blue Bell Park	**W** 3–2	**Houck** (4–1)	Schlottmann (2–1)	**Williams** (7)		5,381	20–8	6–2
Mar. 29	at No. 1 Texas A&M	No. 24	Olsen Field at Blue Bell Park	**L** 6–14	Kent (6–0)	**Fairbanks** (2–3)			6,004	20–9	6–3
Mar. 31	vs. No. 25 Illinois*	No. 29	GCS Ballpark; Sauget, IL	**L** 3–4	McDonnell (3–1)	**Miles** (1–1)	Jay (7)		2,456	20–10	

April (6–9)
Date	Opponent	Rank	Site/stadium	Score	Win	Loss	Save	TV	Attendance	Overall record	SEC record
Apr. 3	No. 6 Florida	No. 29	Taylor Stadium	**L** 1–5	Shore (5–2)	**McClain** (4–3)			714	20–11	6–4
Apr. 4	No. 6 Florida	No. 29	Taylor Stadium	**W** 10–1	**Houck** (5–1)	Puk (5–3)			1,855	21–11	7–4
Apr. 5	No. 6 Florida	No. 29	Taylor Stadium	**W** 5–3	**Fairbanks** (3–3)	Dunning (0–1)			1,051	22–11	8–4
Apr. 9	at Tennessee	No. 16	Lindsey Nelson Stadium; Knoxville, TN	**L** 2–5	**Cox** (1–1)	**McClain** (4–4)	Lee (7)		1,998	22–12	8–5
Apr. 10	at Tennessee	No. 16	Lindsey Nelson Stadium	**W** 8–3	**Houck** (6–1)	Marks (4–4)	**Williams** (8)		2,121	23–12	9–5
Apr. 11	at Tennessee	No. 16	Lindsey Nelson Stadium	**W** 10–1	**Fairbanks** (4–3)	Owenby (2–4)			2,515	24–12	10–5
Apr. 14	Arkansas–Little Rock	No. 17	Taylor Stadium	**L** 3–4	Willenborg (1–2)	**Williams** (4–1)	Allen (5)		334	24–13	
Apr. 17	Alabama	No. 17	Taylor Stadium	**W** 4–3	**McClain** (5–4)	Guilbeau (2–3)	**Williams** (9)		1,763	25–13	11–5
Apr. 18	Alabama	No. 17	Taylor Stadium	**L** 0–6	Walters (4–1)	**Houck** (6–2)			612	25–14	11–6
Apr. 19	Alabama	No. 17	Taylor Stadium	**W** 5–3	**Schwaab** (2–0)	Bramblett (5–2)	**Williams** (10)		345	26–14	12–6
Apr. 21	No. 18 Missouri State*	No. 15	Taylor Stadium	**L** 8–9	Merciez (3–2)	**Williams** (4–2)	Young (9)		1,128	26–15	
Apr. 24	at No. 14 Vanderbilt	No. 15	Hawkins Field; Nashville, TN	**L** 2–9	Fulmer (8–1)	**McClain** (5–5)			3,348	26–16	12–7
Apr. 25	at No. 14 Vanderbilt	No. 15	Hawkins Field	**L** 2–12	Pfeifer (3–2)	**Houck** (6–3)			3,424	26–17	12–8
Apr. 26	at No. 14 Vanderbilt	No. 15	Hawkins Field	**L** 2–5	Bowden (5–1)	**Tribby** (0–3)			3,496	26–18	12–9
Apr. 28	at No. 17 Missouri State*		Hammons Field; Springfield, MO	**L** 8–13	Perez (5–1)	**Schwaab** (2–1)			6,497	26–19	

May (3–7)
Date	Opponent	Rank	Site/stadium	Score	Win	Loss	Save	TV	Attendance	Overall record	SEC record
May 1	Ole Miss		Taylor Stadium	**W** 4–2	**McClain** (6–5)	Trent (6–5)	**Williams** (11)		1,188	27–19	13–9
May 2	Ole Miss		Taylor Stadium	**W** 18–1	**Houck** (7–3)	Bramlett (5–3)			2,417	28–19	14–9
May 3	Ole Miss		Taylor Stadium	**L** 3–4	Weathersby (4–1)	**Fairanks** (4–4)	Short (7)		1,443	28–20	14–10
May 5	Southeast Missouri State*		Taylor Stadium	**L** 5–8	Lawrence (1–0)	**Miles** (1–2)	Lenaburg (1)		405	28–21	
May 8	at No. 1 LSU		Alex Box Stadium; Baton Rouge, LA	**L** 3–8	Norman (4–1)	**McClain** (6–6)			11,009	28–22	14–11
May 9	at No. 1 LSU		Alex Box Stadium	**L** 2–8	Lange (9–0)	**Houck** (7–4)			11,386	28–23	14–12
May 10	at No. 1 LSU		Alex Box Stadium	**L** 5–6	Reynolds (5–0)	**Williams** (4–3)			11,208	28–24	14–13
May 14	Kentucky		Taylor Stadium	**L** 0–1	Brown (–)	**McClain** (6–7)			435	28–25	14–14
May 15	Kentucky		Taylor Stadium	**W** 6–3	**Houck** (8–4)	Beggs (7–4)	**Williams** (12)		843	29–25	15–14
May 16	Kentucky		Taylor Stadium	**L** 2–8	Cody (4–4)	**Fairbanks** (4–5)	Wilson (1)		1,090	29–26	15–15

Postseason (1–2)

SEC Tournament (1–2)
Date	Opponent(Seed)	Rank(Seed)	Site/stadium	Score	Win	Loss	Save	TV	Attendance	Overall record	SEC record
May 19	vs. South Carolina (10)	(7)	Hoover Metropolitan Stadium; Hoover, AL	**W** 5–1	**McClain** (7–7)	Wynkoop (8–5)	**Williams** (13)		4,817	30–26	1–0
May 20	vs. No. 7 Vanderbilt (2)	(7)	Hoover Metropolitan Stadium	**L** 6–7	Wright (5–1)	**Williams** (4–4)			5,205	30–27	1–1
May 21	vs. Alabama (11)	(7)	Hoover Metropolitan Stadium	**L** 3–4	Guilbeau (3–6)	**Houck** (8–5)	Burrows (7)		4,187	30–28	1–2

Legend: = Win = Loss = Canceled
Bold = Missouri team member
Rankings are based on the team's current ranking in the Collegiate Baseball poll.

=== Record vs. conference opponents ===
Last two do not qualify for conf. tourn. Blank are not scheduled. Blue are home games, otherwise away.

2015 SEC baseball records Source: 2015 SEC baseball game results
Team	W–L	ALA	ARK	AUB	FLA	UGA	KEN	LSU	MSU	MIZZ	MISS	SCAR	TENN	TAMU	VAN	Team	Div	SR	SW
ALA	12–18		0–3	3–0	1–2	2–1	.	0–3	2–1	1–2	1–2	.	.	1–2	1–2	ALA	W6	3–7	1–2
ARK	17–12	3–0		2–1	.	2–1	2–1	1–2	2–1	.	2–1	.	1–1	2–1	0–3	ARK	W3	7–2	1–1
AUB	13–17	0–3	1–2		1–2	3–0	.	1–2	2–1	.	2–1	2–1	.	0–3	1–2	AUB	W5	4–6	1–2
FLA	19–11	2–1	.	2–1		2–1	1–2	.	3–0	1–2	1–2	3–0	2–1	.	2–1	FLA	E2	7–3	2–0
UGA	10–19	1–2	1–2	0–3	1–2		2–1	0–2	.	0–3	.	2–1	3–0	.	0–3	UGA	E7	3–7	1–3
KEN	14–15	.	1–2	.	2–1	1–2		2–1	2–1	2–1	.	0–3	3–0	0–2	1–2	KEN	E4	5–5	1–1
LSU	21–8	3–0	2–1	2–1	.	2–0	1–2		2–1	3–0	2–1	2–1	.	2–1	.	LSU	W1	9–1	2–0
MSU	8–22	1–2	1–2	1–2	0–3	.	1–2	1–2		.	0–3	2–1	0–3	1–2	.	MSU	W7	1–9	0–3
MIZZ	15–15	2–1	.	.	2–1	3–0	1–2	0–3	.		2–1	2–1	2–1	1–2	0–3	MIZZ	E3	6–4	1–2
MISS	15–14	2–1	1–2	1–2	2–1	.	.	1–2	3–0	1–2		.	1–2	1–1	2–1	MISS	W4	4–5	1–0
SCAR	13–17	.	.	1–2	0–3	1–2	3–0	1–2	1–2	1–2	.		1–2	2–1	2–1	SCAR	E5	3–7	1–1
TENN	11–18	.	1–1	.	1–2	0–3	0–3	.	3–0	1–2	2–1	2–1		0–3	1–2	TENN	E6	3–6	1–3
TAMU	18–10	2–1	1–2	3–0	.	.	2–0	1–2	2–1	2–1	1–1	1–2	3–0		.	TAMU	W2	6–3	2–0
VAN	20–10	2–1	3–0	2–1	1–2	3–0	2–1	.	.	3–0	1–2	1–2	2–1	.		VAN	E1	7–3	3–0
Team	W–L	ALA	ARK	AUB	FLA	UGA	KEN	LSU	MSU	MIZZ	MISS	SCAR	TENN	TAMU	VAN	Team	Div	SR	SW

Updated for entire regular season.

== 2016 ==
2016 Missouri Tigers baseball
- Conference: Southeastern Conference
- Record: 26–30 (9–21 SEC)
- Head coach: Tim Jamieson (22nd year)
- Assistant coach: Jerry Zulli (1st year); Hunter Mense (2nd year)
- Home stadium: Taylor Stadium

2016 Southeastern Conference baseball standings
	Conf.						Overall
Team	W		L		T	PCT	W		L		T	PCT
Eastern
No. 12 South Carolina ^{x}‍‍‍^{y}	20	–	9	–	0	.690	46	–	18	–	0	.719
No. 7 Florida ‍‍‍^{y}	19	–	10	–	0	.655	52	–	16	–	0	.765
No. 23 Vanderbilt ‍‍‍^{y}	18	–	12	–	0	.600	43	–	19	–	0	.694
Kentucky ‍‍‍	15	–	15	–	0	.500	32	–	25	–	0	.561
Georgia ‍‍‍	11	–	19	–	0	.367	27	–	30	–	0	.474
Tennessee ‍‍‍	9	–	21	–	0	.300	29	–	28	–	0	.509
Missouri ‍‍‍	9	–	21	–	0	.300	26	–	30	–	0	.464
Western
No. 10 Mississippi State ^{x}‍†‍‍^{y}	21	–	9	–	0	.700	44	–	18	–	1	.706
No. 9 Texas A&M ‍‍‡‍^{y}	20	–	10	–	0	.667	49	–	16	–	0	.754
No. 13 LSU ‍‍‍^{y}	19	–	11	–	0	.633	45	–	21	–	0	.682
Ole Miss ‍‍‍^{y}	18	–	12	–	0	.600	43	–	19	–	0	.694
Alabama ‍‍‍	15	–	15	–	0	.500	32	–	26	–	0	.552
Auburn ‍‍‍	8	–	22	–	0	.267	23	–	33	–	0	.411
Arkansas ‍‍‍	7	–	23	–	0	.233	26	–	29	–	0	.473
x – Division champion † – Conference champion ‡ – Tournament champion y – Invited to the NCAA tournament Rankings from Collegiate Baseball

=== Schedule and results ===
2016 Missouri Tigers baseball game log
Regular season (26–30)

February (7–2)
Date	Opponent	Rank	Site/stadium	Score	Win	Loss	Save	TV	Attendance	Overall record	SEC record
Feb. 19	vs. Seton Hall*		City of Palms Park; Fort Myers, FL	**W** 7–0	**McClain** (1–0)	McCarthy (0–1)			67	1–0	
Feb. 20	vs. Seton Hall*		City of Palms Park	**W** 4–1	**Houck** (1–0)	Schellenger (0–1)	**Bartlett** (1)		98	2–0	
Feb. 20	vs. Seton Hall*		City of Palms Park	**L** 4–8	Dana (1–0)	**Plassmeyer** (0–1)	Morris (1)		98	2–1	
Feb. 21	vs. Seton Hall*		City of Palms Park	**L** 1–9	Pendergast (1–0)	**Lee** (0–1)			172	2–2	
Feb. 24	at FIU*		FIU Baseball Stadium; Miami, FL	**W** 7–6	**Shoaff** (1–0)	Crouse (0–1)	**Sharp** (1)		292	3–2	
Feb. 26	vs. Hofstra*		City of Palms Park	**W** 12–2	**McClain** (2–0)	Heidenfelder (0–1)			156	4–2	
Feb. 27	vs. Hofstra*		City of Palms Park	**W** 8–0	**Houck** (2–0)	Bonk (0–1)			187	5–2	
Feb. 27	vs. Hofstra*		City of Palms Park	**W** 11–4	**Tribby** (1–0)	Eisenberg (0–2)			184	6–2	
Feb. 28	vs. Hofstra*		City of Palms Park	**W** 3–2^{10}	**Sharp** (1–0)	Jesch (0–1)			211	7–2	

March (8–10)
Date	Opponent	Rank	Site/stadium	Score	Win	Loss	Save	TV	Attendance	Overall record	SEC record
Mar. 2	Arkansas–Pine Bluff*		Taylor Stadium; Columbia, MO	**W** 2–0	**Lee** (1–1)	Ramos (0–1)	**Sharp** (2)		399	8–2	
Mar. 4	UIC*		Taylor Stadium	**W** 7–4	**Sharp** (2–0)	Birlingmair (0–1)			630	9–2	
Mar. 5	UIC*		Taylor Stadium	**L** 2–4	Dahlberg (1–2)	**Houck** (2–1)	Masa (1)		1,234	9–3	
Mar. 5	UIC*		Taylor Stadium	**W** 10–5	**Tribby** (2–0)	Cerny (0–1)	**Bartlett** (2)		1,077	10–3	
Mar. 6	UIC*		Taylor Stadium	**W** 13–5	**Plassmeyer** (1–1)	Schulewitz (1–2)			1,066	11–3	
Mar. 8	Alabama A&M*		Taylor Stadium	**Canceled**							
Mar. 9	Alabama A&M*		Taylor Stadium	**W** 5–3	**Lee** (2–1)	Hill (0–1)	**Sharp** (3)		353	12–3	
Mar. 11	Youngstown State*		Taylor Stadium	**W** 8–3	**McClain** (3–0)	King (0–2)			781	13–3	
Mar. 12	Youngstown State*		Taylor Stadium	**L** 2–3	Floyd (1–1)	**Tribby** (2–1)	Yarabinec (1)		642	13–4	
Mar. 12	Youngstown State*		Taylor Stadium	**L** 3–4	Yarabinec (2–1)	**Bartlett** (0–1)			321	13–5	
Mar. 15	Southeast Missouri State*		Taylor Stadium	**L** 2–7	Lawrence (1–1)	**Plassmeyer** (1–2)			1,060	13–6	
Mar. 16	Southeast Missouri State*		Taylor Stadium	**W** 13–6	**Bartlett** (1–1)	Siddle (0–1)			730	14–6	
Mar. 18	at No. 1 Florida		Alfred A. McKethan Stadium; Gainesville, FL	**L** 3–4	Anderson (3–0)	**Sharp** (2–1)			3,537	14–7	0–1
Mar. 19	at No. 1 Florida		Alfred A. McKethan Stadium	**L** 2–6	Puk (1–1)	**Houck** (2–2)	Anderson (2)		4,059	14–8	0–2
Mar. 20	at No. 1 Florida		Alfred A. McKethan Stadium	**L** 5–7	Faedo (5–0)	**Tribby** (2–2)	Anderson (3)		3,352	14–9	0–3
Mar. 25	No. 8 Vanderbilt		Taylor Stadium	**L** 6–8	Steele (1–0)	**Carter** (0–1)	Bowden (1)		2,398	14–10	0–4
Mar. 26	No. 8 Vanderbilt		Taylor Stadium	**L** 0–2	Ruppenthal (1–1)	**Bartlett** (1–2)	Bowden (2)		1,262	14–11	0–5
Mar. 27	No. 8 Vanderbilt		Taylor Stadium	**L** 7–17	Johnson (3–0)	**Tribby** (2–3)			263	14–12	0–6
Mar. 29	vs. Saint Louis*		Kauffman Stadium; Kansas City, MO	**W** 5–3	**Bartlett** (2–2)	Shimanovsky (1–2)	**Carter** (1)		724	15–12	

April (–)
Date	Opponent	Rank	Site/stadium	Score	Win	Loss	Save	TV	Attendance	Overall record	SEC record
Apr. 1	at Arkansas		Baum Stadium; Fayetteville, AR	**L** 6–7	Willey (1–1)	**McClain** (3–1)	Jackson (4)		9,012	15–13	0–7
Apr. 2	at Arkansas		Baum Stadium	**W** 8–5	**Houck** (3–2)	McKinney (1–1)	**Tribby** (1)		9,866	16–13	1–7
Apr. 3	at Arkansas		Baum Stadium	**W** 10–1	**Plassmeyer** (2–2)	Loseke (1–1)	**Sharp** (4)		8,088	17–13	2–7
Apr. 5	SIU Edwardsville*		Taylor Stadium	**W** 9–6	**Macciocchi** (1–0)	Fritz (0–1)	**Tribby** (2)		332	18–13	
Apr. 7	Auburn		Taylor Stadium	**L** 9–11	Braymer (3–2)	**Bartlett** (2–3)			393	18–14	2–8
Apr. 8	Auburn		Taylor Stadium	**W** 2–0	**Houck** (4–2)	Camp (2–2)			638	19–14	3–8
Apr. 9	Auburn		Taylor Stadium	**W** 4–3	**Plassmeyer** (3–2)	Mitchell (4–2)	**Sharp** (5)		1,044	20–14	4–8
Apr. 12	at No. 16 Missouri State*		Hammons Field; Springfield, MO	**L** 1–16	Knight (3–0)	**Lee** (2–2)			4,077	20–15	
Apr. 15	No. 9 LSU		Taylor Stadium	**L** 5–7	Poche (5–3)	**McClain** (3–2)	Newman (2)		1,470	20–16	4–9
Apr. 16	No. 9 LSU		Taylor Stadium	**L** 5–9	Lange (4–2)	**Houck** (4–3)	Bugg (2)		2,559	20–17	4–10
Apr. 17	No. 9 LSU		Taylor Stadium	**L** 2–15	Valek III (6–1)	**Plassmeyer** (3–3)			1,544	20–18	4–11
Apr. 22	at No. 12 South Carolina		Founders Park; Columbia, SC	**L** 5–8	Scott (3–1)	**Bartlett** (2–4)	Johnson (3)		6,721	20–19	4–12
Apr. 23	at No. 12 South Carolina		Founders Park	**L** 1–5	Webb (8–2)	**Houck** (4–4)	Reagan (11)		7,753	20–20	4–13
Apr. 24	at No. 12 South Carolina		Founders Park	**L** 2–9	Hill (6–0)	'Plassmeyer (3–4)			7,076	20–21	4–14
Apr. 26	Missouri State*		Taylor Stadium	**W** 17–9	**Bartlett** (3–4)	Cheray (1–2)			615	21–21	
Apr. 29	Tennessee		Tylor Stadium	**W** 5–4	**McClain** (4–2)	Cox (2–4)	**Bartlett** (3)		615	22–21	5–14
Apr. 30	Tennessee		Taylor Stadium	**W** 6–5	**Tribby** (3–3)	Cox (2–5)			1,070	23–21	6–14

May (–)
Date	Opponent	Rank	Site/stadium	Score	Win	Loss	Save	TV	Attendance	Overall record	SEC record
May 1	Tennessee		Taylor Stadium	**W** 8–3	**Plassmeyer** (4–4)	Neely (1–1)			720	24–21	7–14
May 3	vs. Illinois*		GCS Ballpark; Sauget, IL	**L** 4–6	Mamlic (4–6)	**Sharp** (2–2)	Blackburn (10)		1,761	24–22	
May 5	at No. 8 Mississippi State		Dudy Noble Field; Starkville, MS	**L** 2–8	Hudson (7–3)	**McClain** (4–3)			6,630	24–23	7–15
May 6	at No. 8 Mississippi State		Dudy Noble Field	**L** 3–4	Sexton (5–2)	**Houck** (4–5)	Brown (2)		6,904	24–24	7–16
May 7	at No. 8 Mississippi State		Dudy Noble Field	**L** 1–3	Brown (3–2)	**Plassmeyer** (4–5)	Humphreys (6)		7,614	24–25	7–17
May 13	Georgia		Taylor Stadium	**Postponed**							
May 14	Georgia		Taylor Stadium	**L** 4–7	Smith (5–1)	**Bartlett** (3–6)			1,234	24–26	7–18
May 14	Georgia		Taylor Stadium	**W** 5–0	**McClain** (5–3)	Jones (5–6)			908	25–26	8–18
May 15	Georgia		Taylor Stadium	**L** 2–5	Holder (4–3)	**Plassmeyer** (4–6)	Tucker (3)		686	25–27	8–20
May 17	Oklahoma*		Taylor Stadium	**Canceled**							
May 19	at Kentucky		Cliff Hagan Stadium; Lexington, KY	**W** 9–3	**Houck** (5–5)	Brown (2–11)			2,328	26–27	9–19
May 20	at Kentucky		Cliff Hagan Stadium	**L** 1–2	Beggs (9–2)	**McClain** (5–4)	Hjelle (8)		1,676	26–28	9–20
May 21	at Kentucky		Cliff Hagan Stadium	**L** 2–7	Cody (6–2)	**Plassmeyer** (4–7)			2,157	26–29	9–21

Postseason (0–1)

SEC Tournament (0–1)
Date	Opponent(Seed)	Rank(Seed)	Site/stadium	Score	Win	Loss	Save	TV	Attendance	Overall record	SEC record
May 24	vs. No. 10 Vanderbilt (6)	(11)	Hoover Metropolitan Stadium; Hoover, AL	**L** 0–7	Raby (7–1)	**Houck** (5–6)				26–30	0–1

Legend: = Win = Loss = Canceled
Bold = Missouri team member
Rankings are based on the team's current ranking in the Collegiate Baseball poll.

=== Record vs. conference opponents ===
Last two do not qualify for conf. tourn. Blank are not scheduled. Blue are home games, otherwise away.

2016 SEC baseball records Source: 2016 SEC baseball game results
Team	W–L	ALA	ARK	AUB	FLA	UGA	KEN	LSU	MSU	MIZZ	MISS	SCAR	TENN	TAMU	VAN	Team	Div	SR	SW
ALA	15–15		3–0	2–1	.	1–2	1–2	2–1	1–2	.	2–1	0–3	2–1	1–2	.	ALA	W5	5–5	1–1
ARK	7–23	0–3		3–0	0–3	.	2–1	0–3	0–3	1–2	0–3	0–3	.	1–2	.	ARK	W7	2–8	1–6
AUB	8–22	1–2	0–3		.	.	2–1	1–2	0–3	1–2	0–3	.	2–1	1–2	0–3	AUB	W6	2–8	0–4
FLA	19–10	.	3–0	.		2–1	1–2	1–2	1–2	3–0	.	1–1	2–1	3–0	2–1	FLA	E2	6–3	3–0
UGA	11–19	2–1	.	.	1–2		1–2	.	1–2	2–1	1–2	2–1	1–2	0–3	0–3	UGA	E5	3–7	0–2
KEN	15–15	2–1	1–2	1–2	2–1	2–1		.	.	2–1	0–3	2–1	2–1	.	1–2	KEN	E4	6–4	0–1
LSU	19–11	1–2	3–0	2–1	2–1	.	.		1–2	3–0	1–2	.	3–0	1–2	2–1	LSU	W3	6–4	3–0
MSU	21–9	2–1	3–0	3–0	2–1	2–1	.	2–1		3–0	2–1	.	.	0–3	2–1	MSU	W1	9–1	3–1
MIZZ	9–21	.	2–1	2–1	0–3	1–2	1–2	0–3	0–3		.	0–3	3–0	.	0–3	MIZZ	E7	2–8	1–4
MISS	18–12	1–2	3–0	3–0	.	2–1	3–0	2–1	1–2	.		0–3	2–1	1–2	.	MISS	W4	6–4	3–1
SCAR	20–9	3–0	3–0	.	1–1	1–2	1–2	.	.	3–0	3–0		3–0	1–2	1–2	SCAR	E1	5–4	5–0
TENN	9–21	1–2	.	1–2	1–2	2–1	1–2	0–3	.	0–3	1–2	0–3		.	2–1	TENN	E6	2–8	0–3
TAMU	20–10	2–1	2–1	2–1	0–3	3–0	.	2–1	3–0	.	2–1	2–1	.		2–1	TAMU	W2	9–1	2–1
VAN	18–12	.	.	3–0	1–2	3–0	2–1	1–2	1–2	3–0	.	2–1	1–2	1–2		VAN	E3	5–5	3–0
Team	W–L	ALA	ARK	AUB	FLA	UGA	KEN	LSU	MSU	MIZZ	MISS	SCAR	TENN	TAMU	VAN	Team	Div	SR	SW

Updated for entire regular season.

== 2017 ==
2017 Missouri Tigers baseball
- Conference: Southeastern Conference
- Record: 36–23 (14–16 SEC)
- Head coach: Steve Bieser (1st year)
- Assistant coach: Patrick Hallmark (1st year); Lance Rhodes (1st year)
- Home stadium: Taylor Stadium

2017 Southeastern Conference baseball standings
	Conf.						Overall
Team	W		L		T	PCT	W		L		T	PCT
Eastern
No. 1 Florida ^{x}‍†‍‍^{y}	21	–	9	–	0	.700	52	–	19	–	0	.732
No. 10 Kentucky ‍‍‍^{y}	19	–	11	–	0	.633	43	–	23	–	0	.652
No. 15 Vanderbilt ‍‍‍^{y}	15	–	13	–	1	.534	36	–	25	–	1	.589
Missouri ‍‍‍	14	–	16	–	0	.467	36	–	23	–	0	.610
South Carolina ‍‍‍	13	–	17	–	0	.433	35	–	25	–	0	.583
Georgia ‍‍‍	11	–	19	–	0	.367	25	–	32	–	0	.439
Tennessee ‍‍‍	7	–	21	–	0	.250	27	–	25	–	0	.519
Western
No. 2 LSU ^{x}‍†‍‡‍^{y}	21	–	9	–	0	.700	52	–	20	–	0	.722
No. 22 Arkansas ‍‍‍^{y}	18	–	11	–	0	.621	45	–	19	–	0	.703
No. 13 Mississippi State ‍‍‍^{y}	17	–	13	–	0	.567	40	–	27	–	0	.597
No. 8 Texas A&M ‍‍‍^{y}	16	–	14	–	0	.533	41	–	23	–	0	.641
No. 29 Auburn ‍‍‍^{y}	16	–	14	–	0	.533	37	–	26	–	0	.587
Ole Miss ‍‍‍	14	–	16	–	0	.467	32	–	25	–	0	.561
Alabama ‍‍‍	5	–	24	–	1	.183	19	–	34	–	1	.361
x – Division champion † – Conference champion ‡ – Tournament champion y – Invited to the NCAA tournament Rankings from Collegiate Baseball

=== Roster ===
2017 Missouri Tigers baseball team
Players
Coaches

#	Pos.	Name	B/T	Height	Weight	Year	Home town
1	INF	AJ Lewis	R/R	5 ft 9 in (1.75 m)	188 lb (85 kg)	Fr	Chicago, IL
2	RHP	Andy Toelken	R/R	6 ft 2 in (1.88 m)	188 lb (85 kg)	Jr	Green Cove Springs, FL
3	INF	Alex Samples	R/R	5 ft 10 in (1.78 m)	189 lb (86 kg)	Jr	Bridgeport, TX
4	INF	Brian Sharp	L/R	6 ft 1 in (1.85 m)	201 lb (91 kg)	So	Liberty, MO
5	INF	Brett Bond	S/R	6 ft 1 in (1.85 m)	216 lb (98 kg)	Jr	St. Louis, MO
6	INF	Ian Nelson	L/R	5 ft 9 in (1.75 m)	186 lb (84 kg)	So	Lake St. Louis, MO
7	OF	Kirby McGuire	R/R	5 ft 11 in (1.8 m)	183 lb (83 kg)	Sr	Round Rock, TX
8	OF	Connor Brumfield	L/R	5 ft 11 in (1.8 m)	174 lb (79 kg)	So	Columbia, MO
9	INF	Robbie Glendinning	R/R	6 ft 2 in (1.88 m)	196 lb (89 kg)	Jr	Scarborough, Western Australia
10	INF	Matt Berler	R/R	5 ft 11 in (1.8 m)	178 lb (81 kg)	Jr	Hoover, AL
23	OF	Johnny Balsamo	L/L	5 ft 7 in (1.7 m)	156 lb (71 kg)	Jr	Kansas City, MO
38	LHP	Aaron Armstrong	L/L	6 ft 2 in (1.88 m)	180 lb (82 kg)	RS Fr	Bloomington, IL

Head coach

Steve Bieser (1st year)

Assistant coach(es)

Fred Corral (1st year)
Lance Rhodes (1st year)

Legend

- **(C)** Team captain
- **(S)** Suspended
- **(I)** Ineligible
- Injured
- Current redshirt

=== Schedule and results ===
2017 Missouri Tigers baseball game log
Regular season (35–21)

February (7–1)
Date	Opponent	Rank	Site/stadium	Score	Win	Loss	Save	TV	Attendance	Overall record	SEC record
Feb. 17	vs. Eastern Michigan*		City of Palms Park; Fort Myers, FL	**L** 2–6	Mattson (1–0)	**Houck** (0–1)			245	0–1	
Feb. 18	vs. Eastern Michigan*		City of Palms Park	**W** 27–9	**Plassmeyer** (1–0)	Feldman (0–1)			254	1–1	
Feb. 18	vs. Eastern Michigan*		City of Palms Park	**W** 6–5	**Bartlett** (1–0)	Delaplane (0–1)			217	2–1	
Feb. 19	vs. Eastern Michigan*		City of Palms Park	**W** 7–2	**Carter** (1–0)	Allen (0–1)			276	3–1	
Feb. 23	vs. Texas A&M–Corpus Christi*		Whataburger Field; Corpus Christi, TX	**W** 7–6	**Bartlett** (2–0)	Worrell (1–1)			576	4–1	
Feb. 24	vs. Houston*		Whataburger Field	**W** 4–2	**Toelken** (1–0)	Romero (1–1)	**Sikkema** (1)			5–1	
Feb. 25	vs. Texas A&M–Corpus Christi*		Whataburger Field	**W** 9–0	**Plassmeyer** (2–0)	Cooper (0–1)			2,647	6–1	
Feb. 26	vs. Illinois*		Whataburger Field	**W** 7–6	**Sikkema** (1–0)	Jones (0–2)				7–1	

March (14–4)
Date	Opponent	Rank	Site/stadium	Score	Win	Loss	Save	TV	Attendance	Overall record	SEC record
Mar. 3	UIC*		Taylor Stadium; Columbia, MO	**W** 7–2	**Houck** (1–1)	Dahlberg (0–1)			708	8–1	
Mar. 4	UIC*		Taylor Stadium	**W** 6–4	**Sikkema** (2–0)	Cerny (0–1)			1,232	9–1	
Mar. 5	UIC*		Taylor Stadium	**W** 11–10	**Sharp** (1–0)	Padilla (0–1)			811	10–1	
Mar. 7	Eastern Illinois*	No. 26	Taylor Stadium	**W** 10–1	**Montes De Oca** (1–0)	Beaman (0–1)			794	11–1	
Mar. 8	Western Carolina*	No. 26	Taylor Stadium	**W** 7–6^{10}	**Sikkema** (3–0)	Anderson (0–1)			594	12–1	
Mar. 10	Appalachian State*	No. 26	Taylor Stadium	**W** 4–0	**Houck** (2–1)	Holden (1–2)	**Gromacki** (1)		283	13–1	
Mar. 11	Appalachian State*	No. 26	Taylor Stadium	**W** 7–1	**Plassmeyer** (3–0)	Schmid (2–2)			160	14–1	
Mar. 12	Appalachian State*	No. 26	Taylor Stadium	**W** 3–2	**Sikkema** (4–0)	Brill (0–1)			392	15–1	
Mar. 14	Chicago State*	No. 23	Taylor Stadium	**Canceled**							
Mar. 15	Chicago State*	No. 23	Taylor Stadium	**W** 7–6^{13}	**Sharp** (2–0)	Baier (2–2)			293	16–1	
Mar. 17	at Alabama	No. 23	Sewell–Thomas Stadium; Tuscaloosa, AL	**W** 3–0	**Houck** (3–1)	Walters (3–2)	**Sikkema** (2)		3,194	17–1	1–0
Mar. 18	at Alabama	No. 23	Sewell–Thomas Stadium	**W** 7–4	**Plassmeyer** (4–0)	Duarte (1–1)			3,428	18–1	2–0
Mar. 19	at Alabama	No. 23	Sewell–Thomas Stadium	**W** 9–5	**Bartlett** (3–0)	Rukes (1–1)	**Sikkema** (3)		3,418	19–1	3–0
Mar. 21	Little Rock*	No. 5	Taylor Stadium	**W** 11–8	**Montes De Oca** (2–0)	Brown (1–1)	**Sharp** (1)		672	20–1	
Mar. 24	No. 29 Arkansas	No. 5	Taylor Stadium	**L** 2–9	Knight (3–1)	**Houck** (3–2)	Taccolini (2)		638	20–2	3–1
Mar. 25	No. 29 Arkansas	No. 5	Taylor Stadium	**W** 7–2	**Sikkema** (5–0)	Stephan (4–1)			711	21–2	4–1
Mar. 26	No. 29 Arkansas	No. 5	Taylor Stadium	**L** 8–9	Alberius (2–3)	**Toelken** (1–1)			2,229	21–3	4–2
Mar. 28	Southeast Missouri State*	No. 18	Taylor Stadium	**L** 5–6	Green (2–0)	**Dulle** (0–1)	Chandler (1)		479	21–4	
Mar. 31	No. 11 Florida	No. 18	Taylor Stadium	**L** 3–4	Faedo (5–1)	**Houck** (3–3)	Byrne (3)		1,034	21–5	4–3

April (6–13)
Date	Opponent	Rank	Site/stadium	Score	Win	Loss	Save	TV	Attendance	Overall record	SEC record
Apr. 1	No. 11 Florida	No. 18	Taylor Stadium	**L** 1–2	Singer (4–1)	**Plassmeyer** (4–1)				21–6	4–4
Apr. 2	No. 11 Florida	No. 18	Taylor Stadium	**L** 1–2	Kowar (4–0)	**Montes De Oca** (2–1)	Byrne (4)		658	21–7	4–5
Apr. 4	vs. Illinois*		GCS Ballpark; Sauget, IL	**L** 3–5	Thompson (1–1)	**Gromacki** (0–1)	Gerber (3)		2,432	21–8	
Apr. 6	at Georgia		Foley Field; Athens, GA	**L** 0–3	Gist (2–2)	**Houck** (3–4)	Cairness (4)		1,650	21–9	4–6
Apr. 7	at Georgia		Foley Field	**W** 8–5	**Bartlett** (4–0)	Smith (1–4)			1,759	22–9	5–6
Apr. 8	at Georgia		SunTrust Park; Atlanta, GA	**W** 6–1	**Montes De Oca** (3–1)	Adkins (4–3)	**Sikkema** (4)		33,025	23–9	6–6
Apr. 11	Arkansas–Pine Bluff*		Taylor Stadium	**W** 13–1	**Toelken** (2–1)	Phelps (0–2)			539	24–9	
Apr. 12	Arkansas–Pine Bluff*		Taylor Stadium	**W** 15–6	**Dulle** (1–1)	Esparza (0–1)			584	25–9	
Apr. 14	Kentucky		Taylor Stadium	**L** 2–5	Hjelle (5–2)	**Houck** (3–5)	Salow (7)		2,402	25–10	6–7
Apr. 15	Kentucky		Taylor Stadium	**W** 9–8	**Sikkema** (6–0)	Logue (5–3)			1,255	26–10	7–7
Apr. 16	Kentucky		Taylor Stadium	**L** 1–6	Lewis (5–2)	**Montes De Oca** (3–2)	Salow (8)		638	26–11	7–8
Apr. 18	Missouri State*		Taylor Stadium	**L** 3–5	Fromson (4–3)	**Toelken** (2–2)	Young (4)		1,038	26–12	
Apr. 21	Ole Miss		Swayze Field; Oxford, MS	**W** 9–3	**Bartlett** (5–0)	McArthur (2–3)			8,004	27–12	8–8
Apr. 22	Ole Miss		Swayze Field	**L** 1–3	Rolison (5–2)	**Houck** (3–6)	Woolfolk (8)		8,129	27–13	8–9
Apr. 23	Ole Miss		Swayze Field	**L** 6–9	Roth (2–0)	**Montes De Oca** (3–2)	Ethridge (1)		7,208	27–14	8–10
Apr. 25	at Missouri State*		Hammons Field; Springfield, MO	**L** 1–5	Knight (3–1)	**Toelken** (2–3)			5,351	27–15	
Apr. 28	Texas A&M		Taylor Stadium	**L** 1–11	Hill (6–3)	**Bartlett** (5–1)				27–16	8–11
Apr. 28	Texas A&M		Taylor Stadium	**L** 1–7	Chafin (6–1)	**Houck** (3–7)			838	27–17	8–12
Apr. 30	Texas A&M		Taylor Stadium	**L** 2–7	Kolek (3–2)	**Montes De Oca** (3–4)	Kilkenny (7)		476	27–18	8–13

May (8–3)
Date	Opponent	Rank	Site/stadium	Score	Win	Loss	Save	TV	Attendance	Overall record	SEC record
May 2	Murray State*		Taylor Stadium	**W** 11–0	**Toelken** (3–3)	Hranec (3–3)			391	28–18	
May 5	at Vanderbilt		Hawkins Field; Nashville, TN	**L** 2–5	Raby (8–3)	**Bartlett** (5–2)	Hayes (7)		2,936	28–19	8–14
May 6	at Vanderbilt		Hawkins Field	**W** 2–1^{12}	**Sikkema** (6–0)	Conger (2–1)			2,891	29–19	9–14
May 7	at Vanderbilt		Hawkins Field	**L** 5–14	King (2–0)	**Montes De Oca** (3–5)			3,012	29–20	9–15
May 12	No. 30 South Carolina		Taylor Stadium	**L** 3–4	Crowe (5–4)	**Sikkema** (7–1)	Johnson (9)		1,370	29–21	9–16
May 13	No. 30 South Carolina		Taylor Stadium	**W** 5–3	**Houck** (4–7)	Hill (3–5)			1,146	30–21	10–16
May 14	No. 30 South Carolina		Taylor Stadium	**W** 5–3	**Toelken** (4–3)	Reagan (5–2)	**Plassmeyer** (1)		864	31–21	11–16
May 16	Eastern Kentucky		Taylor Stadium	**W** 13–4	**Plassmeyer** (5–1)	Ford (1–4)			475	32–21	
May 18	Tennessee		Lindsey Nelson Stadium; Knoxville, TN	**W** 5–0	**Sikkema** (8–1)	Martin (5–7)			1,033	33–21	12–16
May 19	Tennessee		Lindsey Nelson Stadium	**W** 2–0	**Bartlett** (6–2)	Stallings (3–4)			1,703	34–21	13–16
May 20	Tennessee		Lindsey Nelson Stadium	**W** 8–2	**Montes De Oca** (4–5)	Lipinski (6–1)			2,003	35–21	14–16

Postseason (1–2)

SEC Tournament (1–2)
Date	Opponent(Seed)	Rank(Seed)	Site/stadium	Score	Win	Loss	Save	TV	Attendance	Overall record	SEC record
May 23	vs. Texas A&M (7)	(10)	Hoover Metropolitan Stadium; Hoover, AL	**W** 12–7	**Toelken** (5–3)	Chafin (7–2)				36–21	1–0
May 24	vs. No. 3 LSU (2)	(10)	Hoover Metropolitan Stadium	**L** 3–10	Gilbert (4–1)	**Sikkema** (8–2)			6,890	36–22	1–1
May 25	vs. South Carolina (11)	(10)	Hoover Metropolitan Stadium	**L** 2–10	Crowe (6–5)	**Bartlett** (6–3)			7,279	36–23	1–2

Legend: = Win = Loss = Canceled
Bold = Missouri team member
Rankings are based on the team's current ranking in the Collegiate Baseball poll.

=== Record vs. conference opponents ===
Last two do not qualify for conf. tourn. Blank are not scheduled. Blue are home games, otherwise away.

2017 SEC baseball records Source: 2017 SEC baseball game results
Team	W–L	ALA	ARK	AUB	FLA	UGA	KEN	LSU	MSU	MIZZ	MISS	SCAR	TENN	TAMU	VAN	Team	Div	SR	SW
ALA	5–24		1–2	3–0	0–3	.	.	0–3	0–3	0–3	0–3	1–2	.	0–3	0–2	ALA	W7	1–9	1–6
ARK	18–11	2–1		1–2	.	3–0	.	1–2	3–0	2–1	1–2	.	1–1	2–1	2–1	ARK	W2	6–3	2–0
AUB	16–14	0–3	2–1		3–0	2–1	.	0–3	2–1	.	2–1	2–1	2–1	1–2	.	AUB	W5	7–3	1–2
FLA	21–9	3–0	.	0–3		3–0	2–1	2–1	.	3–0	3–0	2–1	1–2	.	2–1	FLA	E1	8–2	4–1
UGA	11–19	.	0–3	1–2	0–3		2–1	0–3	2–1	1–2	.	2–1	2–1	.	1–2	UGA	E6	4–6	0–3
KEN	19–11	.	.	.	1–2	1–2		2–1	1–2	2–1	2–1	2–1	3–0	3–0	2–1	KEN	E2	7–3	2–0
LSU	21–9	3–0	2–1	3–0	1–2	3–0	1–2		3–0	.	2–1	2–1	.	1–2	.	LSU	W1	7–3	4–0
MSU	17–13	3–0	0–3	1–2	.	1–2	2–1	0–3		.	3–0	2–1	3–0	2–1	.	MSU	W3	6–4	3–2
MIZZ	14–16	3–0	1–2	.	0–3	2–1	1–2	.	.		1–2	2–1	3–0	0–3	1–2	MIZZ	E4	4–6	2–2
MISS	14–16	3–0	2–1	1–2	0–3	.	1–2	1–2	0–3	2–1		.	.	2–1	2–1	MISS	W6	5–5	1–2
SCAR	13–17	2–1	.	1–2	1–2	1–2	1–2	1–2	1–2	1–2	.		3–0	.	1–2	SCAR	E5	2–8	1–0
TENN	7–21	.	1–1	1–2	2–1	1–2	0–3	.	0–3	0–3	.	0–3		1–2	1–1	TENN	E7	1–7	0–4
TAMU	16–14	3–0	1–2	2–1	.	.	0–3	2–1	1–2	3–0	1–2	.	2–1		1–2	TAMU	W4	5–5	2–1
VAN	15–13	2–0	1–2	.	1–2	2–1	1–2	.	.	2–1	1–2	2–1	1–1	2–1		VAN	E3	5–4	0–0
Team	W–L	ALA	ARK	AUB	FLA	UGA	KEN	LSU	MSU	MIZZ	MISS	SCAR	TENN	TAMU	VAN	Team	Div	SR	SW

Updated for entire regular season. Alabama and Vanderbilt had one tie game.

== 2018 ==
2018 Missouri Tigers baseball
- Conference: Southeastern Conference
- Record: 34–22 (12–18 SEC)
- Head coach: Steve Bieser (2nd year)
- Assistant coaches: Fred Corral (1st year); Lance Rhodes (2nd year)
- Home stadium: Taylor Stadium

2018 Southeastern Conference baseball standings
	Conf.				Overall
Team	W		L	PCT	W		L	PCT
East Division
No. 3 Florida ^{x}‍†‍‍^{y}	20	–	10	.667	49	–	21	.700
No. 20 Georgia ‍‍‍^{y}	18	–	12	.600	39	–	21	.650
No. 12 South Carolina ‍‍‍^{y}	17	–	13	.567	37	–	26	.587
No. 16 Vanderbilt ‍‍‍^{y}	16	–	14	.533	35	–	27	.565
Kentucky ‍‍‍	13	–	17	.433	34	–	22	.607
Missouri ‍‍‍	12	–	18	.400	34	–	22	.607
Tennessee ‍‍‍	12	–	18	.400	29	–	27	.518
West Division
No. 19 Ole Miss ^{x}‍‍‡‍^{y}	18	–	12	.600	48	–	18	.727
No. 2 Arkansas ^{x}‍‍‍^{y}	18	–	12	.600	48	–	21	.696
No. 15 Auburn ‍‍‍^{y}	15	–	15	.500	43	–	23	.652
LSU ‍‍‍^{y}	15	–	15	.500	39	–	27	.591
No. 4 Mississippi State ‍‍‍^{y}	15	–	15	.500	39	–	29	.574
Texas A&M ‍‍‍^{y}	13	–	17	.433	40	–	22	.645
Alabama ‍‍‍	8	–	22	.267	27	–	29	.482
x – Division champion † – Conference champion ‡ – Tournament champion y – Invited to the NCAA tournament Rankings from Collegiate Baseball

=== Schedule and results ===
2018 Missouri Tigers baseball game log
Regular season (34–21)

February (7–3)
Date	Opponent	Rank	Site/stadium	Score	Win	Loss	Save	TV	Attendance	Overall record	SEC record
Feb. 16	at FIU*		FIU Baseball Stadium; Miami, FL	**W** 3–1	**Sikkema** (1–0)	Nunez (0–1)	**Ball** (1)		1,019	1–0	
Feb. 17	at FIU*		FIU Baseball Stadium	**W** 22–1	**Plassmeyer** (1–0)	Allen (0–1)			1,178	2–0	
Feb. 18	at FIU*		FIU Baseball Stadium	**L** 5–11	Casey (1–0)	**Siebenserger** (0–1)	Soto (1)		1,234	2–1	
Feb. 21	at Miami (FL)*		Alex Rodriguez Park at Mark Light Field; Coral Gables, FL	**W** 9–0	**Sharp** (1–0)	Mediavilla (0–1)			2,202	3–1	
Feb. 23	vs. Northeastern*		City of Palms Park; Fort Myers, FL	**W** 5–2	**Montes De Oca** (1–0)	Christian (0–2)	**Ball** (2)		1,678	4–1	
Feb. 24	vs. Northeastern*		City of Palms Park	**L** 8–10	Murphy (1–0)	**Bedell** (0–1)			498	4–2	
Feb. 24	vs. Northeastern*		City of Palms Park	**W** 20–1	**LaPlante** (1–0)	David (0–1)			325	5–2	
Feb. 25	vs. Northeastern*		City of Palms Park	**L** 2–4	Mellen (1–0)	**Toelken** (0–1)	Misiaszek (1)		541	5–3	
Feb. 27	Alabama A&M*		Taylor Stadium; Columbia, MO	**W** 7–3	**Bedell** (1–1)	Warner (1–1)			822	6–3	
Feb. 28	Alabama A&M*		Taylor Stadium	**W** 14–0	**Dulle** (1–0)	Alsbrooks (0–1)			373	7–3	

March (–)
Date	Opponent	Rank	Site/stadium	Score	Win	Loss	Save	TV	Attendance	Overall record	SEC record
Mar. 2	UMBC*		Taylor Stadium	**W** 7–1	**Montes De Oca** (2–0)	Wilson (0–1)			588	8–3	
Mar. 3	UMBC*		Taylor Stadium	**W** 6–5	**Ball** (1–0)	Schoch (0–1)			736	9–3	
Mar. 4	UMBC*		Taylor Stadium	**W** 5–0	**Toelken** (1–1)	Bailey (0–2)	**Bedell** (1)		510	10–3	
Mar. 6	Eastern Illinois*		Taylor Stadium	**Canceled**							
Mar. 9	La Salle*		Taylor Stadium	**W** 8–5	**Montes De Oca** (3–0)	Jenkins (0–1)	**Ball** (3)		373	11–3	
Mar. 10	La Salle*		Taylor Stadium	**W** 7–1	**Plassmeyer** (2–0)	Kennedy (0–2)			876	12–3	
Mar. 10	La Salle*		Taylor Stadium	**W** 7–0	**Toelken** (2–1)	Holt (0–3)			702	13–3	
Mar. 13	No. 20 Wichita State*	No. 24	Taylor Stadium	**W** 9–4	**LaPlante** (2–0)	Snavely (1–1)			510	14–3	
Mar. 16	at No. 16 LSU	No. 24	Alex Box Stadium; Baton Rouge, LA	**L** 2–4	Hess (3–2)	**Montes De Oca** (3–1)	Bain (2)		10,334	14–4	0–1
Mar. 17	at No. 16 LSU	No. 24	Alex Box Stadium	**W** 12–6	**Plassmeyer** (3–0)	Gilbert (2–1)			10,747	15–4	1–1
Mar. 18	at No. 16 LSU	No. 24	Alex Box Stadium	**L** 5–7	Hilliard (5–0)	**Toelken** (2–2)			10,141	15–5	1–2
Mar. 20	Arkansas State*	No. 25	Taylor Stadium	**W** 11–1	**LaPlante** (3–0)	Alberius (2–1)			406	16–5	
Mar. 21	Arkansas State*	No. 25	Taylor Stadium	**W** 14–9	**Sharp** (2–0)	Patterson (0–1)			407	17–5	
Mar. 23	Mississippi State	No. 25	Taylor Stadium	**W** 4–1	**Sikkema** (2–0)	Pilkington (1–3)	**Toelken** (1)		406	18–5	2–2
Mar. 24	Mississippi State	No. 25	Taylor Stadium	**L** 1–3^{16}	Smith (2–0)	**LaPlante** (3–1)			406	18–6	2–3
Mar. 25	Mississippi State	No. 25	Taylor Stadium	**W** 5–4^{11}	**Toelken** (3–2)	France (1–1)			496	19–6	3–3
Mar. 28	at Western Illinois*	No. 22	Alfred D. Boyer Stadium; Macomb, IL	**Canceled**							
Mar. 30	at Auburn	No. 22	Plainsman Park; Auburn, AL	**L** 2–5	Mize (6–0)	**Sikkema** (2–1)	Coker (6)		3,629	19–7	3–4
Mar. 31	at Auburn	No. 22	Plainsman Park	**W** 2–1	**Toelken** (4–2)	Daniel (2–1)			3,286	20–7	4–4

April (–)
Date	Opponent	Rank	Site/stadium	Score	Win	Loss	Save	TV	Attendance	Overall record	SEC record
Apr. 1	Auburn	No. 22	Plainsman Park	**W** 5–0	**Montes De Oca** (4–1)	Burns (2–4)	**Ball** (4)		3,005	21–7	5–4
Apr. 3	vs. Missouri State*	No. 23	Busch Stadium; St. Louis, MO	**Canceled**							
Apr. 4	SIU Edwardsville*	No. 23	Taylor Stadium	**W** 12–1	**LaPlante** (4–1)	Llorens (0–3)			406	22–7	
Apr. 6	Alabama	No. 23	Taylor Stadium	**L** 1–2	Finnerty (4–1)	**Sikkema** (2–2)	Medders (5)		406	22–8	5–5
Apr. 7	Alabama	No. 23	Taylor Stadium	**W** 1–0	**Plassmeyer** (4–0)	Duarte (3–1)			541	23–8	6–5
Apr. 7	Alabama	No. 23	Taylor Stadium	**L** 1–5	Cameron (1–1)	**Montes De Oca** (4–2)	Medders (6)		541	23–9	6–6
Apr. 10	Missouri State*		Hammons Field; Springfield, MO	**W** 8–6	**Gubelman** (1–0)	Fromson (2–1)			3,307	24–9	
Apr. 13	at No. 1 Florida		Alfred A. McKethan Stadium; Gainesville, FL	**L** 1–3	Butler (4–1)	**Sikkema** (2–3)	Byrne (9)		6,214	24–10	6–7
Apr. 14	at No. 1 Florida		Alfred A. McKethan Stadium	**L** 2–10	Kowar (6–1)	**LaPlante** (4–2)			5,820	24–11	6–8
Apr. 15	at No. 1 Florida		Alfred A. McKethan Stadium	**L** 2–7	Dyson (5–2)	**Plassmeyer** (4–1)	Byrne (10)		3,955	24–12	6–9
Apr. 17	Chicago State*		Taylor Stadium	**W** 5–3	**Sharp** (3–0)	Fitka (0–2)	**Toelken** (2)		613	25–12	
Apr. 19	Vanderbilt		Taylor Stadium	**W** 2–1	**Sikkema** (3–3)	Fellows (4–3)	**Toelken** (3)		780	26–12	7–9
Apr. 20	Vanderbilt		Taylor Stadium	**W** 3–1	**Montes De Oca** (5–2)	King (0–3)	**Ball** (5)		2,312	27–12	8–9
Apr. 21	Vanderbilt		Taylor Stadium	**L** 2–6	Hickman (7–1)	**Plassmeyer** (4–2)			3,146	27–13	8–10
Apr. 24	Missouri State*		Taylor Stadium	**W** 8–2	**Sharp** (4–0)	Buckner (3–4)			2,331	28–13	
Apr. 27	at Kentucky		Cliff Hagan Stadium; Lexington, KY	**L** 1–2	Hjelle (6–3)	**Sikkema** (3–4)	Machamer (8)		4,112	28–14	8–11
Apr. 28	at Kentucky		Cliff Hagan Stadium	**W** 14–11	**Plassmeyer** (5–2)	Haake (1–4)	**Montes De Oca** (1)		3,864	29–14	9–11
Apr. 29	at Kentucky		Cliff Hagan Stadium	**L** 10–11	Marshall (1–0)	**Montes De Oca** (5–3)	Harper (1)		3,499	29–15	9–12

May (–)
Date	Opponent	Rank	Site/stadium	Score	Win	Loss	Save	TV	Attendance	Overall record	SEC record
May 1	at Iowa*		Duane Banks Field; Iowa City, IA	**W** 17–16^{11}	**Montes De Oca** (6–3)	Baumann (1–1)	**Anderson** (1)		596	30–15	
May 3	Georgia		Taylor Stadium	**L** 6–10	Adkins (5–0)	**Sikkema** (3–5)			817	30–16	9–13
May 4	Georgia		Taylor Stadium	**L** 3–5	Hancock (6–3)	**Ball** (1–1)	Schunk (7)		1,342	30–17	9–14
May 5	Georgia		Taylor Stadium	**L** 1–7	Smith (6–1)	**Montes De Oca** (6–4)			1,024	30–18	9–15
May 11	at No. 14 South Carolina		Founders Park; Columbia, SC	**W** 5–3	**Toelken** (5–2)	Chapman (3–1)	**Ball** (6)		6,922	31–18	10–15
May 12	at No. 14 South Carolina		Founders Park	**L** 3–6	Hill (6–5)	**Plassmeyer** (5–3)			7,216	31–19	10–16
May 13	at No. 14 South Carolina		Founders Park	**L** 0–1	Demurias (5–0)	**LaPlante** (4–3)			6,435	31–20	10–17
May 15	Indiana State*		Taylor Stadium	**W** 8–7	**Toelken** (6–2)	Whitbread (2–3)	**Gubelman** (1)		696	32–20	
May 17	Tennessee		Taylor Stadium	**W** 3–2^{12}	**Pferrer** (1–0)	Crochet (5–6)			906	33–20	11–17
May 18	Tennessee		Taylor Stadium	**L** 1–2	Hunley (7–3)	**Plassmeyer** (5–4)	Stallings (2)		1,264	33–21	11–18
May 19	Tennessee		Taylor Stadium	**W** 8–3	**Ball** (2–1)	Neely (4–2)			1,176	34–21	12–18

Postseason (0–1)

SEC Tournament (0–1)
Date	Opponent(Seed)	Rank(Seed)	Site/stadium	Score	Win	Loss	Save	TV	Attendance	Overall record	SEC record
May 22	vs. No. 14 South Carolina (5)	(12)	Hoover Metropolitan Stadium; Hoover, AL	**L** 2–4	Dumurias (6–0)	**Toelken** (6–3)	Lawson (2)		8,072	34–22	0–1

Legend: = Win = Loss = Canceled
Bold = Missouri team member
Rankings are based on the team's current ranking in the Collegiate Baseball poll.

=== Record vs. conference opponents ===
Last two do not qualify for conf. tourn. Blank are not scheduled. Blue are home games, otherwise away.

2018 SEC baseball records Source: 2018 SEC baseball game results
Team	W–L	ALA	ARK	AUB	FLA	UGA	KEN	LSU	MSU	MIZZ	MISS	SCAR	TENN	TAMU	VAN	Team	Div	SR	SW
ALA	8–22		0–3	0–3	.	1–2	2–1	1–2	1–2	2–1	1–2	.	0–3	0–3	.	ALA	W7	2–8	0–4
ARK	18–12	3–0		3–0	1–2	1–2	3–0	1–2	0–3	.	1–2	2–1	.	3–0	.	ARK	W2	5–5	4–1
AUB	15–15	3–0	0–3		1–2	.	1–2	2–1	2–1	1–2	0–3	.	.	2–1	3–0	AUB	W3	5–5	2–2
FLA	20–10	.	2–1	2–1		2–1	2–1	.	0–3	3–0	.	2–1	2–1	2–1	3–0	FLA	E1	9–1	2–1
UGA	18–12	2–1	2–1	.	1–2		1–2	.	.	3–0	1–2	3–0	2–1	2–1	1–2	UGA	E2	6–4	2–0
KEN	13–17	1–2	0–3	2–1	1–2	2–1		.	2–1	2–1	.	2–1	1–2	.	0–3	KEN	E5	5–5	0–2
LSU	15–15	2–1	2–1	1–2	.	.	.		2–1	2–1	1–2	0–3	3–0	1–2	1–2	LSU	W4	5–5	1–1
MSU	15–15	2–1	3–0	1–2	3–0	.	1–2	1–2		1–2	2–1	.	.	1–2	0–3	MSU	W5	4–6	2–1
MIZZ	12–18	1–2	.	2–1	0–3	0–3	1–2	1–2	2–1		.	1–2	2–1	.	2–1	MIZZ	E6	4–6	0–2
MISS	18–12	2–1	2–1	3–0	.	2–1	.	2–1	1–2	.		1–2	2–1	2–1	1–2	MISS	W1	7–3	1–0
SCAR	17–13	.	1–2	.	1–2	0–3	1–2	3–0	.	2–1	2–1		3–0	2–1	2–1	SCAR	E3	6–4	2–1
TENN	12–18	3–0	.	.	1–2	1–2	2–1	0–3	.	1–2	1–2	0–3		2–1	1–2	TENN	E7	3–7	1–2
TAMU	13–17	3–0	0–3	1–2	1–2	1–2	.	2–1	2–1	.	1–2	1–2	1–2		.	TAMU	W6	3–7	1–1
VAN	16–14	.	.	0–3	0–3	2–1	3–0	2–1	3–0	1–2	2–1	1–2	2–1	.		VAN	E4	6–4	2–2
Team	W–L	ALA	ARK	AUB	FLA	UGA	KEN	LSU	MSU	MIZZ	MISS	SCAR	TENN	TAMU	VAN	Team	Div	SR	SW

Updated for entire regular season.
