= Truman Bulldogs =

Truman State University sports teams

- University: Truman State University
- NCAA: Division II
- Conference: Great Lakes Valley Conference
- Athletic director: Signe Coombs
- Location: Kirksville, Missouri
- Varsity teams: 20
- Football stadium: James S. Stokes Stadium
- Basketball arena: John J. Pershing Arena
- Nickname: Bulldogs
- Colors: Purple and white
- Mascot: Spike
- Fight song: "Hail to the Bulldogs!"
- Website: trumanbulldogs.com
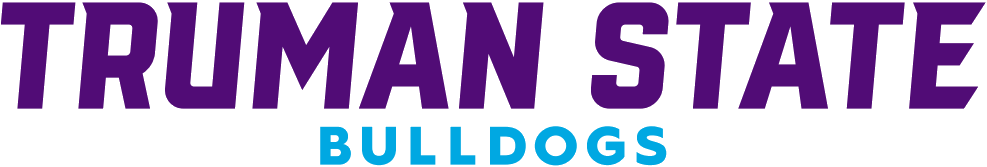

The Truman Bulldogs are the sports teams of Truman State University, located in Kirksville, Missouri, United States. They participate in the NCAA's Division II and in the Great Lakes Valley Conference (GLVC), joining the conference in 2013 after having been a member of the Mid-America Intercollegiate Athletics Association (MIAA) since that league's creation in 1912.

Before the university changed its name from Northeast Missouri State University in 1996, athletics teams were known as the Northeast Missouri State Bulldogs.

== Sports sponsored ==
Truman State sponsors 16 varsity sports, including seven men's sports and nine women's sports. In 2018, the university cut men's tennis and wrestling due to budget cuts enacted by the Missouri state government.

Men's sports	Women's sports
Baseball	Basketball
Basketball	Cross country
Cross country	Golf
Football	Soccer
Soccer	Softball
Swimming	Swimming
Track and field	Tennis
	Track and field
	Volleyball

== National championships ==
The Bulldogs have won seven team NCAA national championships, all at the Division II level.

=== Team ===
Association	Division	Sport	Year	Opponent/Runner-up	Score
NCAA (7)	Division II (7)	Women's swimming and Diving (7)	2001	Drury	656–610.5 (+45.5)
NCAA (7)	Division II (7)	Women's swimming and Diving (7)	2002	Drury	733–548 (+185)
NCAA (7)	Division II (7)	Women's swimming and Diving (7)	2003	Drury	682–410 (+272)
NCAA (7)	Division II (7)	Women's swimming and Diving (7)	2004	Drury	641–561 (+80)
NCAA (7)	Division II (7)	Women's swimming and Diving (7)	2005	Drury	579.5–530 (+49.5)
NCAA (7)	Division II (7)	Women's swimming and Diving (7)	2006	Drury	664–505 (+159)
NCAA (7)	Division II (7)	Women's swimming and Diving (7)	2008	Drury	461.5–449 (+12.5)

== Mascot ==
The official mascot of Truman State Athletic teams is the Bulldog.

== Athletic facilities ==
- James S. Stokes Stadium is the home of the TSU Bulldog football and track and field teams. Inside the stadium is the Kenneth Gardner Track.
- John J. Pershing Arena is the home for Bulldog basketball and volleyball and includes the Truman Natatorium, home of the swim teams. It also serves as the main practice and office facility for the Truman Athletics Department.
- Bulldog Softball Park is the site of Truman’s softball field, and is located just south of Stokes Stadium. The softball field was constructed in 1972 and has a seating capacity for 200 spectators. Additional seating can be transported in when necessary.
- Bulldog Baseball Park is the site of Truman’s baseball field, and is located just south of Stokes Stadium.
- Bulldog Soccer Park is home of the Bulldog soccer teams.
- Truman Tennis Courts is home of the Truman tennis teams.
