= Truman Bulldogs baseball =

- 2025 Truman State Bulldogs baseball team
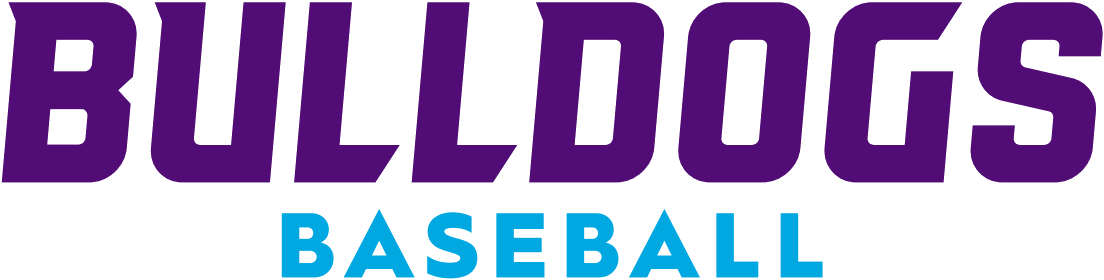
- Founded: 1966; 60 years ago
- University: Truman State University
- Head coach: Dan Davis (19th season)
- Conference: Great Lakes Valley; West Division
- Location: Kirksville, Missouri
- Home stadium: Bulldogs Baseball Park (capacity: 250)
- Nickname: Bulldogs
- Colors: Purple and white

College World Series champions
- 0

College World Series appearances
- 2015

NCAA tournament appearances
- 2015

Conference tournament champions
- 0

Conference regular season champions
- 0

The Truman Bulldogs baseball program represents Truman State University in college baseball and competes in the Division II level of the National Collegiate Athletic Association (NCAA). In 2013, Truman became a member of the Great Lakes Valley Conference. Prior to this, Truman was in the Mid-America Intercollegiate Athletics Association from 1966 to 2012. TSU's home games are played at the Bulldogs Baseball Park in Kirksville, Missouri. The Bulldogs have made one appearance in the Division II Tournament as an at-large bid in 2015, eventually making it to the College World Series.

== History ==
Truman's baseball program dates back to 1966, when the program went 4–8. Since their inaugural season, the Bulldogs claimed one Division II Tournament appearance as an at-large bid in 2015 in the Midwest Region. During this playoff berth, they won five consecutive games in the regional to advance to the Division II College World Series in Cary, North Carolina. The Bulldogs have an all-time record of 637–1333–6, which is a .323 winning percentage over 54 seasons.

== Conference affiliations ==
- 1966–2012 Mid-America Intercollegiate Athletics Association
- 2013–present Great Lakes Valley Conference

== All-time series records against GLVC members ==
Opponent	Overall record
Bellarmine	0–2
Drury	9–25
Illinois Springfield	3–2
Indianapolis	3–5
Lewis	4–6
Maryville	15–10
McKendree	2–2
Missouri S&T	38–46
Missouri-St. Louis	14–22
Quincy	36–81
Rockhurst	7–18
Saint Joseph's	1–2
Southern Indiana	7–7
Wisconsin-Parkside	4–4
William Jewell	13–13
*As of July 10, 2018.

== Stadium ==
The Bulldogs have played their home games at Bulldogs Baseball Park since 1966. The stadium is located just to the south of Stokes Stadium (Truman's Football Stadium) and adjacent to the Bulldogs Softball Park. The current capacity of the stadium is 250. The field has undergone many renovations, and consistently plays as one of the nicest playing surfaces in Division II.

== Coaches ==
- Sam Nugent (1966–1980, 1982–1989) 238–338–1
- Kevin Finke (1981) 11–20
- Kirby Cannon (1990–1992) 38–88
- BJ Pumroy (1993–2000) 93–235
- Lawrence Scully (2001–2006) 73–193
- Dan Davis (2007–present) 184–371

== Postseason ==
=== Division II baseball tournament ===
NCAA Tournament berths (1)

- 2015

NCAA Division II College World Series appearances

- 2015 (T-8th)

== Alumni ==
- Al Nipper (1978–1980) - MLB pitcher (1983–1989), 8th round pick in 1980 draft
- Guy Curtright - MLB outfielder (1943–1946)
- Aaron Royster (1991–1994) - drafted in the 35th round by the Philadelphia Phillies
- Tony Vandemore (1996–1999) - drafted in the 25th round by the San Diego Padres
- Christian Witt (2008–2011) - drafted in the 36th round by the Kansas City Royals
- Charles Blakley (1968–1971) - free agent signed by the St. Louis Cardinals in 1971
- Mark O'Reilly (1974) - free agent signed by the Oakland Athletics in 1974
- Mike Lowes (1974–1977) - free agent signed by the St. Louis Cardinals in 1977

== See also ==
- Truman Bulldogs
