= Jackson (surname) =

Jackson (/ˈdʒæksən/) is a common surname of English origin. In 1980, Jackson was the 24th most common surname in England and Wales. In the 1990 United States Census, Jackson was the thirteenth most frequently reported surname, accounting for 0.3% of the population.

Jackson is also commonly used as a first name.

Notable people with the name include:

== Surname ==
=== Entertainment ===
==== Film and television ====
- Amy Jackson (born 1992), British actress and model
- Andrew Jackson (actor) (born 1963), Canadian actor
- Anne Jackson (1925–2016), American actress
- Anthony Jackson (actor) (1944–2006), English actor
- Bee Jackson (1903–1933), American actress and dancer
- Bill Jackson (television personality) (1935–2022), American TV personality
- Charlotte Jackson (born 1978), English TV presenter
- Cheyenne Jackson (born 1975), American actor and singer
- David Jackson (British actor) (1934–2005), British actor
- Eugene Jackson (1916–2001), American actor
- Frederick J. Jackson (1886–1953), American screenwriter
- Gemma Jackson (born 1951), British art director
- George Jackson (activist) (1941–1971), American author and activist
- George Jackson (filmmaker) (1958–2000), American film director and producer
- Glenda Jackson (1936–2023), British actress and Member of Parliament
- Gordon Jackson (actor) (1923–1990), Scottish actor
- Horace Jackson (1898–1952), American actor
- Horace Jackson (filmmaker) (fl.1963 –1976), American filmmaker, and educator
- Jeremy Jackson (born 1980), American actor
- John Jackson (writer), British screenwriter
- Jonathan Jackson (actor) (born 1982), American actor
- Joshua Jackson (born 1978), Canadian-American actor
- Kate Jackson (born 1948), American actress
- Leonard Jackson (actor) (1928–2013), American stage and screen actor
- Marion Jackson (1897–1962), American screenwriter
- Mick Jackson (director) (born 1943), British film director
- Mike and Michelle Jackson, Australian children's TV entertainers
- Paul Jackson (producer) (born 1947), British TV producer
- Peter Jackson (born 1961), New Zealand director
- Philip Jackson (actor) (born 1948), English actor
- Sammy Jackson (1937–1995), American actor
- Saoirse-Monica Jackson (born 1993), Irish actress
- Samuel L. Jackson (born 1948), American actor
- Shar Jackson (born 1976), American TV and film actress
- Sherry Jackson (born 1942), American actress and child star
- Skai Jackson (born 2002), American actress
- Tom Jackson (actor) (born 1948), Canadian actor and singer
- Victoria Jackson (born 1959), American actress and comedian

==== Music ====
- The Jackson family, an American musical family consisting of:
  - First generation:
    - Joe Jackson (1928–2018), patriarch and manager
    - Katherine Jackson (born 1930), matriarch
  - Second generation:
    - Rebbie Jackson (born 1950), American singer
    - Jackie Jackson (born 1951), member of the Jackson 5
    - Tito Jackson (1953–2024), guitarist/vocalist of Jackson 5
    - Jermaine Jackson (born 1954), member of the Jackson 5
    - La Toya Jackson (born 1956), singer
    - Marlon Jackson (born 1957), member of the Jackson 5
    - Michael Jackson (1958–2009), singer-songwriter and dancer, member of the Jackson 5
    - Randy Jackson (born 1961), member of the Jackson 5
    - Janet Jackson (born 1966), singer-songwriter
  - Third generation:
    - Taj Jackson (born 1973), son of Tito; member of 3T
    - Taryll Adren Jackson (born 1975), son of Tito; member of 3T
    - Sigmund Jackson, Jr. (born 1977), son of Jackie; better known as rapper DealZ
    - Tito Joe Jackson (born 1978), son of Tito; member of 3T
    - Jaafar Jackson (born 1996), son of Jermaine
    - Paris Jackson (born 1998), daughter of Michael
- Al Jackson, Jr. (1935–1975), American drummer
- Alan Jackson (born 1958), American country music singer and songwriter
- Andrew Jackson (recording engineer), British recording engineer
- Anthony Jackson (musician) (1952–2025), American bass player
- Armand "Jump" Jackson (1917–1985), American R&B drummer, bandleader and songwriter
- Bashar Jackson (1999–2020), American rapper and singer known professionally as Pop Smoke
- Bob Jackson (musician) (born 1949), British musician
- Bull Moose Jackson (1919–1989), American blues and R&B singer and saxophonist
- Carl Jackson (born 1953), American musician
- Christine Jackson (cellist) (1962–2016), British-born Australian cellist
- Chuck Jackson (1937–2023), American R&B singer
- Curtis Jackson (born 1975), American rapper performing as 50 Cent
- David Jackson (rock musician) (born 1947), British musician
- Deon Jackson (1946–2014), American soul singer
- Eddie Jackson (musician) (born 1961), American bass guitarist
- Eddie Jackson (singer) (1926–2002), American country musician
- Elly Jackson (born 1988), British singer, part of the band/duo La Roux
- Francis Jackson (1917–2022), British composer and organist
- Fred Jackson (saxophonist) (born 1929), American R&B and jazz saxophonist
- Fred Jackson Jr. (born c. 1945), American jazz saxophonist
- Freddie Jackson (born 1956), American soul singer
- Fruteland Jackson (born 1953), American electric blues guitarist, singer and songwriter
- George Pullen Jackson (1874–1953), American musician
- Graham Jackson (British conductor) (1967–2012), British conductor
- Henry Jackson (1956–2014), American rapper, known as Big Bank Hank
- Jack Jackson (British radio) (1906–1978), British musician
- Jerry Naylor Jackson (1939–2019), American musician, member of The Crickets
- Jim Jackson (musician) (c. 1884–1937), American blues musician
- J. J. Jackson (media personality) (1941–2004), American MTV VJ
- J. J. Jackson (singer) (born 1941), American soul musician
- Jennie Jackson (1852–1910), American singer
- Joe Jackson (musician) (born 1954), British singer/songwriter
- John Jackson (born 1977), American rapper, known as Fabolous
- John Jackson (blues musician) (1924–2002), American blues musician
- Johnny Jackson (musician) (1951–2006), American drummer
- Kate Jackson (singer) (born 1979), British singer
- Keenon Jackson (born 1990), American rapper known professionally as YG
- Keisha Jackson (born 1965), American musician
- Lee Jackson (blues musician) (1921–1979), American blues musician
- Lee Jackson (bassist) (born 1943), British bass guitarist
- Lee Jackson (composer) (born 1963), American composer
- Leon Jackson (born 1988), Scottish musician
- Mahalia Jackson (1911–1972), American gospel singer
- Mark Jackson (musician) (born 1970), English musician
- Mick Jackson (singer) (born 1947), English musician
- Millie Jackson (born 1944), American musician
- Milt Jackson (1923–1999), American jazz vibraphonist
- Milton Jackson, British music producer
- O'Shea Jackson, known as Ice Cube (born O'Shea Jackson in 1969), American rapper/actor
- O'Shea Jackson Jr. (born 1991), American rapper/actor and son of Ice Cube
- Papa Charlie Jackson (c. 1885–1938), American musician
- Paul Jackson (bassist) (1947–2021), American bass guitarist
- Paul Jackson Jr. (born 1959), American musician
- Randy Jackson (born 1956), American musician, judge on American Idol
- Randy Jackson (Zebra) (born 1955), American rock musician, frontman for the band Zebra
- Roddy Jackson (1942–2022), American rockabilly musician
- Sammy Jackson (singer), Canadian jazz singer
- Stevie Jackson (born 1969), Scottish musician
- Stonewall Jackson (musician) (1932–2021), American country music singer
- Thunder Jackson, musician and singer
- Tony Jackson (jazz musician) (1876–1920), American composer
- Tony Jackson (singer) (1938–2003), British singer
- Vasti Jackson (born 1959), American blues musician and record producer
- Walter Jackson (singer) (1938–1983), American soul singer
- Wanda Jackson (born 1937), American singer, songwriter, and musician
- William Jackson (Scottish composer) (born 1955), Scottish harpist and composer
- William E. (Will) Jackson (born 1945), American Greenpeace activist and musician
- New Orleans Willie Jackson, New Orleans jazz singer

=== Military ===
- Arthur J. Jackson (1924–2017), U.S. Marine Corps officer, Medal of Honor recipient for actions during World War II
- Charles Douglas Jackson (1902–1964), U.S. Army general, expert on psychological warfare
- Conrad Feger Jackson (1813–1862), general in the Union Army in the American Civil War
- Frederick George Jackson (1860–1938), British army officer and explorer
- Henry Jackson (Continental Army general) (1747–1809), U.S. Army general in the Revolutionary War
- Sir Henry Jackson (Royal Navy officer) (1855–1929), British First Sea Lord during World War I
- Henry R. Jackson (1820–1898), Confederate general
- Joe M. Jackson (1923–2019), U.S. Air Force officer, Medal of Honor recipient for actions during the Vietnam War
- John Francis Jackson (1908–1942), Australian fighter ace
- Leslie Douglas Jackson (1917–1980), Australian fighter ace
- Mary M. Jackson, American vice admiral in the United States Navy
- Sir Mike Jackson (British Army officer) (born 1944), British Army Chief of the General Staff
- Norman Cyril Jackson (1919–1994), British RAF, recipient of the Victoria Cross
- Philip Jackson (surveyor) (1802–1879), British naval officer and surveyor
- Sir Stanley Jackson (cricketer) (1870–1947), British Army officer, cricketer, and politician
- Thomas Jonathan Jackson, known as Stonewall Jackson (1824–1863), Confederate general
- William Jackson (Australian soldier) (1897–1959), Australian Army recipient of the Victoria Cross
- Sir William Jackson (British Army officer) (1917–1999), British Army officer and Governor of Gibraltar
- William Hicks Jackson (1835–1903), Confederate general

=== Politics ===
- Andrew Jackson (1767–1845), seventh president of the United States of America
- Burke Jackson (born 1949), American politician and rancher
- Caroline Jackson (1946–2025), British (Cornish) politician
- Colin Jackson (politician) (1921–1981), British MP
- Derrick Jackson (politician) (born 1966), American politician
- Ed Jackson (Tennessee politician) (born 1948), American politician
- Fitz Jackson, Jamaican politician
- George Jackson (Canadian politician) (1808–1885), Canadian MP
- George Jackson (Irish politician) (1761–1805), Irish MP
- Sir George Duckett, 1st Baronet (1725–1822), born George Jackson, British MP
- Giorgio Jackson (born 1987), Chilean politician
- Glenda Jackson (1936–2023), British politician
- Gordon Jackson (politician) (born 1948), Scottish politician
- Helen Jackson (politician) (born 1939), British politician
- John Jackson (Derbyshire politician) (1919–1976), British politician
- Sir John Jackson (engineer) (1851–1919), British politician
- Jovan Jackson, American politician
- Julie Jackson, American politician
- Linda Jackson (politician), mayor of Vaughan, Ontario
- Lorna Jackson (1935–2002), mayor of Vaughan, Ontario
- Merton S. Jackson (died 1985), American politician from Maryland
- Peter Jackson (politician) (1928–2020), British politician
- Richard Jackson (colonial agent) (c. 1721–1787), British politician
- Robert Jackson (Wantage MP) (born 1946), British politician
- Samuel Jacob Jackson (1848–1942), Canadian politician
- Samuel Macauley Jackson (1851–1912), American clergyman, editor and author
- Stewart Jackson (born 1965), British politician and adviser
- Syd Jackson (politician) (1889–1941), Australian MP
- Tara Jackson, American lawyer and public administrator
- William Jackson, 1st Baron Allerton (1840–1917), British politician
- Willie Jackson (politician) (born 1961), New Zealand politician and broadcaster

==== American politics and law ====
- Alphonso Jackson (born 1945), 13th U.S. Secretary of Housing and Urban Development
- Barney Jackson (1904–1971), Washington politician
- Caldwell Jackson, Member of the Maine House of Representatives
- Charles Jackson (judge) (1775–1855), Massachusetts Supreme Court judge
- Charles Jackson (Rhode Island politician) (1797–1876), Governor of Rhode Island
- Claiborne Fox Jackson (1806–1862), Governor of Missouri
- Darrell Jackson (politician) (born 1957), South Carolina state senator
- David Jackson (Pennsylvania physician) (1747–1801), American apothecary and physician, delegate to the Continental Congress
- David S. Jackson (1813–1872), U.S. Representative from New York
- Douglas S. Jackson (born 1954), Tennessee state senator
- Edward B. Jackson (1793–1826), U.S. Representative from Virginia
- Edward L. Jackson (1873–1954), Governor of Indiana
- Frank D. Jackson (1854–1938), Governor of Iowa
- Frank G. Jackson (born 1946), 57th mayor of Cleveland, Ohio
- Fred S. Jackson (1868–1931), U.S. Representative from Kansas
- George Jackson (Virginia) (1757–1831), U.S. Representative from Virginia
- George Jackson (Black Panther) (1941–1971), American leader of the Black Panther Party
- Giles Beecher Jackson (1853–1924), American lawyer, publisher and civil rights activist
- Hancock Lee Jackson (1796–1876), Governor of Missouri
- Harold B. Jackson Jr. (1939–2016), Wisconsin circuit court judge
- Henry M. "Scoop" Jackson (1912–1983), U.S. Representative and Senator from Washington
- Howell Edmunds Jackson (1832–1895), U.S. Senator from Tennessee
- Jabez Young Jackson (1790–1839), U.S. Representative from Georgia
- Jacob B. Jackson (1829–1893), Governor of West Virginia
- James Jackson (Georgia politician) (1757–1806), U.S. Representative and Senator from Georgia
- James Jackson (congressman) (1819–1887), U.S. Representative from Georgia
- James Jackson, Jr. (New York) (c. 1826–1891), mayor of Lockport, New York
- James M. Jackson (1825–1901), U.S. Representative from West Virginia
- James S. Jackson (1823–1862), U.S. Representative from Kentucky
- Jerry D. Jackson (born 1941), American politician
- Jesse Jackson (1941–2026), American civil rights leader
- Jesse Jackson, Jr. (born 1965), son of Jesse Jackson and U.S. Representative from Illinois
- John Jackson (mayor) (1809–1887), 9th mayor of Tampa, Florida
- John Jackson (law professor) (1932–2015), law professor at Georgetown University
- John G. Jackson (politician) (1777–1825), U.S. Representative from Virginia
- John Jay Jackson, Jr. (1824–1907), federal judge from West Virginia
- Jonathan Jackson (delegate) (1743–1810), delegate to the Continental Congress from Massachusetts
- Jordan Carlisle Jackson Jr. (1848–1918) American attorney, Republican party delegate, Black community leader
- Joseph Webber Jackson (1796–1854), U.S. Representative from Georgia and mayor of Savannah, Georgia
- Ketanji Brown Jackson (born 1970), Associate Justice of the U.S. Supreme Court
- Lydia P. Jackson (born 1960), African-American Louisiana legislator, daughter of Alphonse J. Jackson
- Maynard Jackson (1938–2003), mayor of Atlanta, Georgia
- Mike Jackson (Texas politician) (born 1953), Texas state senator
- Mortimer M. Jackson (1809–1889), Wisconsin jurist and diplomat
- Noyes L. Jackson (1860–1933), Illinois state representative
- Omer Stokes Jackson (1884–1940), 28th Indiana Attorney General
- Oscar Lawrence Jackson (1840–1920), U.S. Representative from Pennsylvania
- Richard E. Jackson (born 1945), mayor of Peekskill, New York
- Richard Jackson, Jr. (1764–1838), U.S. Representative from Rhode Island
- Robert Jackson (New York politician), New York City Council member
- Robert H. Jackson (1892–1954), Supreme Court Justice and chief Nuremberg Trials prosecutor
- Samuel D. Jackson (1895–1951), U.S. Representative from Indiana
- Sandi Jackson (born 1963), Chicago alderman
- Sheila Jackson Lee (born 1950), U.S. Representative from Texas
- Tito Jackson (politician), member of the Boston City Council
- Troy Jackson (born 1968), president of the Maine Senate
- William Jackson (secretary) (1759–1828), secretary to the U.S. Constitutional Convention
- William Jackson (Massachusetts) (1783–1855), U.S. Representative from Massachusetts
- William Harding Jackson (1901–1971), U.S. National Security Advisor
- William Humphreys Jackson (1839–1915), U.S. Representative from Maryland
- William Purnell Jackson (1868–1939), U.S. Senator from Maryland
- William Schuyler Jackson (died 1932), New York State Attorney General
- William T. Jackson (1876–1933), mayor of Toledo, Ohio
- William Terry Jackson (1794–1882), U.S. Representative from New York

=== Science ===
- A.C. Jackson (died 1921), American surgeon
- Charles Loring Jackson (1847–1935), American organic chemist
- Charles Thomas Jackson (1805–1880), American geologist
- Chevalier Jackson (1865-1958), American physician
- Cyril V. Jackson (1903–1988), South African astronomer
- David M. Jackson, Canadian mathematician
- Derek A. Jackson (1906–1982), British atomic physicist, radar expert in the RAF during WWII
- Douglas N. Jackson (1929–2004), American psychologist
- Dunham Jackson (1888–1946), American mathematician
- Frank Cameron Jackson (born 1943), Australian philosopher
- Frank Hilton Jackson (1870–1960), English mathematician
- Sir Frederick John Jackson (1859–1929), English explorer and ornithologist
- Sir Henry Jackson, Baronet (1875–1937), British mineralogist
- James A. Jackson (born 1954), British geologist
- James Caleb Jackson (1811–1895), American inventor
- James R. Jackson (1924–2011), American mathematician
- John David Jackson (physicist) (1925–2016), Canadian-American physicist
- John Jackson (astronomer) (1887–1958), Scottish astronomer
- John Angelo Jackson (1921–2005), English mountaineer and explorer
- John Hughlings Jackson (1835–1911), British neurologist
- Julian T. Jackson (born 1954), British historian
- Nancy B. Jackson (1956–2022), American chemist and scientist
- Peter Wyse Jackson (born 1955), Irish botanist
- Raymond Carl Jackson (1928–2008), American botanist and plant geneticist
- Robert Jackson (astronomer) (born 1949), American astronomer
- Shirley Ann Jackson (born 1946), American physicist, president of Rensselaer Polytechnic Institute
- Sidney William Jackson (1873–1946), Australian ornithologist
- Steve Jackson (mathematician), American mathematician
- Wes Jackson (born 1936), American writer; founder/president of The Land Institute

=== Sports ===
==== Athletics ====
- Barry Jackson (athlete) (born 1941), English track and field athlete
- Bo Jackson (born 1962), professional baseball and football player for the Kansas City Royals and Oakland Raiders
- Colin Jackson (born 1967), Welsh 110m hurdle athlete
- Emma Jackson (born 1988), English 800m runner
- Marjorie Jackson (born 1931), Australian sprinter and former Governor of South Australia
- Mark Jackson (athlete) (born 1969), Canadian track and field athlete
- Wilton Jackson (born 1935), Trinidad and Tobago sprinter

==== Baseball ====
- Al Jackson (1935–2019), American baseball player
- Alex Jackson (baseball) (born 1995), American baseball player
- Andre Jackson (born 1996), American baseball player
- Bill Jackson (baseball) (1881–1958), American baseball player
- Conor Jackson (born 1982), American baseball player
- Danny Jackson (born 1962), American Major League All-Star left-handed pitcher in the 1980s and 1990s
- Darrell Jackson (baseball) (born 1956), American baseball player
- Drew Jackson (born 1993), American baseball player
- Edwin Jackson (born 1983), American baseball player
- Grant Jackson (baseball) (1942–2021), American baseball player
- Jay Jackson (baseball) (born 1987), American baseball player
- Jeremiah Jackson (born 2000), American baseball player
- Jim Jackson (baseball) (1877–1955), American baseball player
- John W. Jackson (1858–1913), American baseball player, known as Bud Fowler
- Larry Jackson (baseball) (1931–1990), American baseball player
- Lillian Jackson (1919–2003), All-American Girls Professional Baseball League player
- Mike Jackson (left-handed pitcher) (born 1946), American baseball player
- Mike Jackson (right-handed pitcher) (born 1964), American longtime right-handed Major League relief pitcher in the 1980s, 1990s, and 2000s
- Randy Jackson (baseball) (1926–2019), American baseball player
- Reggie Jackson (born 1946), Hall of Fame American baseball player
- Shoeless Joe Jackson (1888–1951), American baseball player
- Steven Jackson (baseball) (born 1982), American baseball player
- Travis Jackson (1903–1987), American baseball shortstop in the 1920s and 1930s
- Zach Jackson (born 1983), American baseball player
- Zach Jackson (born 1994), American baseball player

==== Basketball ====
- Angel Jackson (born 2001), American basketball player
- Ashlon Jackson (born 2004), American basketball player
- Bobby Jackson (born 1973), American basketball player
- Brittany Jackson (born 1983), American basketball player
- Chloe Jackson (born 1996), American basketball player
- Demetrius Jackson (born 1994), American professional basketball player for the Houston Rockets
- Elmarko Jackson (born 2004), American basketball player
- Garrett Jackson (born 1991), American basketball coach and former player
- Greg Jackson (basketball, born 1952) (1952–2012), American basketball player for the Phoenix Suns and New York Knicks
- Greg Jackson (basketball, born 1959), American basketball coach for North Carolina Central and Delaware State
- Jaren Jackson (born 1967), American basketball player
- Jeff Jackson (basketball) (born 1961), American basketball coach
- Jenteal Jackson, American basketball coach
- Jermaine Jackson (basketball) (born 1976), American basketball player
- Jim Jackson (basketball) (born 1970), American basketball player
- Lauren Jackson (born 1981), Australian professional basketball player
- Lucious Jackson (1941–2022), American basketball player
- Marc Jackson (born 1975), American basketball player
- Maree Jackson (born 1954), Australian basketball player
- Mark Jackson (basketball) (born 1965), American basketball player
- Mervin Jackson (1946–2012), American basketball player
- Michael Jackson (basketball) (born 1964), American basketball player
- Phil Jackson (born 1945), American basketball coach
- Pierre Jackson (born 1991), American basketball player
- Ralph Jackson (basketball) (born 1962), American basketball player
- Rick Jackson (born 1989), American basketball player
- Rickea Jackson (born 2001), American basketball player
- Tammy Jackson (born 1962), American former basketball player
- Stanley Jackson (basketball) (born 1975), American basketball player
- Stephen Jackson (born 1978), American basketball player
- Stuart Wayne Jackson (born 1955), American basketball player, coach, NBA executive
- Taiyanna Jackson (born 2000), American basketball player
- Tiffany Jackson (basketball) (1985–2022), American basketball player and coach
- Tony Jackson (basketball, born 1942) (died 2005), American basketball player in the ABL and ABA
- Tony Jackson (basketball, born 1958), American basketball player for the Los Angeles Lakers
- Traevon Jackson (born 1992), American basketball player; son of fellow basketball player Jim Jackson
- Troy Jackson (basketball) (1976–2011), American basketball player

==== Boxing ====
- Luke Jackson (boxer) (born 1985), Australian boxer
- David Jackson (boxer) (1955–2004), New Zealand boxer
- John Jackson (English boxer) (1769–1845), English boxer
- John Jackson (Virgin Islands boxer) (born 1989), U.S. Virgin Islands boxer
- John David Jackson (boxer) (born 1962), American boxer
- Julian Jackson (boxer) (born 1960), U.S. Virgin Islands boxer
- Julius Jackson (born 1987), U.S. Virgin Islands boxer
- Peter Jackson (boxer) (1861–1901), Australian boxer
- Phil Jackson (boxer) (born 1964), American boxer
- Sugar Jackson (born 1981), Belgian boxer

==== Cricket ====
- Archie Jackson (1909–1933), Australian cricketer
- Curtis Jackson (cricketer) (born 1967), Bermudian cricketer
- George Jackson (cricketer), English cricketer
- Guy Jackson (cricketer) (1896–1966), English cricketer
- John Jackson (cricketer, born 1833) (1833–1901), English cricketer
- John Jackson (Lancashire cricketer) (1841–1906), English cricketer
- John Jackson (Worcestershire cricketer) (1880–1968), English cricketer
- John Jackson (Somerset cricketer) (1898–1958), Chilean cricketer
- Leonard Jackson (cricketer) (1848–1887), English cricketer
- Les Jackson (cricketer) (1921–2007), English cricketer
- Orlanzo Jackson (born 1974), West Indies cricketer
- Paul Jackson (Australian cricketer) (born 1961), Australian cricketer
- Paul Jackson (Irish cricketer) (born 1959), Irish cricketer
- Peter Jackson (cricketer) (1911–1999), British cricketer
- Samuel Jackson (cricketer) (1849–1941), English cricketer

==== Association football ====
- A Jackson (fl. late 19th century), English footballer
- Alan Jackson (footballer) (born 1938), English footballer
- Alex Jackson (footballer, born 1905) (died 1946), Scottish footballer
- Amy Jackson (born 1987), Australian footballer
- Andy Jackson (footballer, born 1891), Scottish footballer
- Andy Jackson (footballer, born 1988), Scottish footballer
- Bob Jackson (football manager), English football manager
- Colin Jackson (Scottish footballer) (1946–2015), Scottish footballer
- Darren Jackson (Scottish footballer) (born 1966), Scottish footballer
- David Jackson (footballer, born 1937), English footballer
- Dick Jackson (born c. 1878), Scottish footballer
- Elphinstone Jackson (1868–1945), English footballer and co-founder of Indian Football Association in 1893
- Ernest Jackson (footballer) (1914–1996), English footballer
- Henry Jackson (football manager) (c. 1850–1930), English football manager
- James Jackson (footballer, born 1900) (died c. 1976), British footballer
- Jamie Jackson (footballer) (born 1986), English footballer
- Jimmy Jackson (footballer, born 1875), Scottish-Australian footballer
- John Jackson (footballer, born 1923) (1923–1992), English footballer
- John Jackson (footballer, born 1942), English footballer
- John Jackson (Scottish footballer) (1906–1965), Scottish footballer
- Johnnie Jackson (born 1982), English footballer
- Mark Jackson (footballer, born 1977), English footballer
- Matt Jackson (born 1971), English footballer
- Michael Jackson (footballer, born 1973), English footballer
- Michael Jackson (footballer, born 1980), English footballer
- Nicolas Jackson (footballer, born 2001), Senegalese footballer
- Peter Jackson (footballer, born 1905) (died 1986), English footballer
- Peter Jackson (footballer, born 1937) (died 1991), English footballer
- Peter Jackson (footballer, born 1961), English footballer
- Richard Jackson (footballer, born 1900), English footballer
- Richard Jackson (footballer, born 1980), English footballer
- Tommy Jackson (footballer, born 1898) (died 1975), English footballer
- Tommy Jackson (footballer, born 1946), Northern Irish footballer
- Wattie Jackson, Scottish footballer

==== Australian rules football ====
All individuals listed here are Australian unless otherwise indicated.

- Edward Jackson (footballer) (1925–1996)
- Jim Jackson (Australian rules footballer) (1890–1976)
- Mark "Jacko" Jackson (born 1959), also an actor
- Syd Jackson (footballer, born 1944)

==== Gridiron football ====
- Adoree' Jackson (born 1995), American football player
- Andrew Jackson (linebacker) (born 1992), American football player
- Alonzo Jackson (born 1980), American football player
- Antwuan Jackson (born 1997), American football player
- Asa Jackson (born 1989), American football player
- Bennett Jackson (born 1991), American football player
- Billy Jackson (American football) (born 1959), American football player
- Blake Jackson (born 1994), American football player
- Bo Jackson (born 1962), American football and baseball player
- Bobby Jackson (American football coach) (born 1940), American football coach
- Bobby Jackson (cornerback) (born 1956), American football player
- Brad Jackson (born 1975), American football player and coach
- Brad Jackson (quarterback) (born 2005), American football player
- Brandon Jackson (American football) (born 1985), American football player
- Brennan Jackson (born 2000), American football player
- Buddy Jackson (born 1989), American football player
- Chad Jackson (born 1985), American football player
- Charles Jackson (linebacker) (born 1965), American football player
- Charles Jackson (defensive back) (born 1962), American football player
- Charlie Jackson (American football coach) (born 1976), American football coach
- Charlie Jackson (defensive back) (1936–2021), American football player
- Courtney Jackson (born 2001), American football player
- Dan Jackson (American football), American football player
- Darrell Jackson (born 1978), American football player
- Darrell Jackson Jr. (born 2003), American football player
- DeSean Jackson (born 1986), American football player
- Devon Jackson (born 2004), American football player
- D'Marco Jackson (born 1998), American football player
- Domani Jackson (born 2003), American football player
- Donte Jackson (American football) (born 1995), American football player
- D'Qwell Jackson (born 1983), American football player
- Drake Jackson (born 2001), American football player
- Earnest Jackson (born 1959), American football player
- Eddie Jackson (American football, born 1980), American football player and chef
- Eddie Jackson (safety) (born 1993), American football player
- Edwin Jackson (American football) (1991–2018), American football player
- Elijah Jackson (born 2001), American football player
- Frank Jackson (American football) (born 1939), American football player
- Fred Jackson (running back) (born 1981), American football player
- Gabe Jackson (born 1991), American football player
- Giles Jackson (born 2001), American football player
- Harold Jackson (American football) (born 1946), American football player
- Honor Jackson (born 1948), American football player
- Jahzare Jackson (born 2004), American football player
- JaQuae Jackson (born 2000), American football player
- Ja'Quinden Jackson (born 2001), American football player
- James Jackson (American football) (born 1976), American football player
- J. C. Jackson (born 1995), American football player
- Jervonte Jackson (born 1986), American football player
- Jha'Quan Jackson (born 2000), American football player
- Joey Jackson (born 1950), American football player
- John Jackson (offensive tackle) (born 1965), American football player
- John Jackson (wide receiver) (born 1967), American football player
- Johnnie Jackson (American football) (born 1967), American football player
- Jonah Jackson (born 1997), American football player
- Jonathan Jackson (linebacker) (born 1977), American football player
- Jonathan Jackson (defensive end) (born 1982), American football player
- Josh Jackson (cornerback) (born 1996), American football player
- Justin Jackson (American football) (born 1996), American football player
- Kalen Jackson (née Irsay; born 1987), American football executive
- Kearis Jackson (born 1999), American football player
- Keith Jackson (tight end) (born 1965), American football player
- Keith Jackson (defensive tackle) (born 1985), American football player (son of the tight end of the same name)
- Keondre Jackson (born 2002), American football player
- Kenyatta Jackson (born 2004), American football player
- Khyree Jackson (1999–2024), American football player
- KJ Jackson (born 2006), American football player
- Kordell Jackson (born 1999), American football player
- Lamar Jackson (born 1997), American football player
- Lamar Jackson (cornerback) (born 1998), American football player
- Landon Jackson (born 2003), American football player
- Lucky Jackson (born 1997), American football player
- Malik Jackson (defensive end) (born 1990), American football player
- Mark Jackson (wide receiver) (born 1963), American football player
- Mark Jackson (American football coach) (born 1972), American football coach
- Marlin Jackson (born 1983), American football player
- McKinnley Jackson (born 2001), American football player
- Michael Jackson (linebacker) (born 1957), American football player
- Michael Jackson (wide receiver) (born 1969), American football player
- Nick Jackson (American football) (born 2001), American football player
- Quinton Jackson (American football), American football player
- Randy Jackson (offensive lineman) (born 1944), American football player
- Randy Jackson (running back) (1948–2010), American football player
- Rich Jackson (born 1941), American football player
- Rob Jackson (American football) (born 1985), American football player
- Robert Jackson (guard) (born 1953), American football player
- Robert Jackson (linebacker) (born 1954), American football player
- Roger Jackson (wide receiver) (born 1989), American football player
- Roy Jackson (1876-1944), American football player and coach
- Scooter Jackson, American football player
- Shedrick Jackson (born 1999), American football player
- Steve Jackson (defensive back) (born 1969), American football player
- Steven Jackson (born 1983), American football player
- Steven Jackson (fullback) (born 1984), American football player
- Stanley Jackson (American football) (born 1975), American football player
- Steve Jackson (linebacker) (born 1942), American football player
- Tanard Jackson (born 1985), American football player
- Tarron Jackson (born 1998), American football player
- Tarvaris Jackson (1983–2020), American football player
- Tayven Jackson (born 2004), American football player
- Terry Jackson (cornerback) (born 1955), American football player
- Terry Jackson (running back) (born 1976), American football player
- T. J. Jackson (wide receiver) (1943–2007), American football player
- T. J. Jackson (defensive tackle) (born 1983), American football player
- Tom Jackson (American football, born 1951), former American football player and ESPN analyst
- Tony Jackson (American football) (born 1982), American football player
- Tre' Jackson (born 1992), American football player
- Trishton Jackson (born 1998), American football player
- Tyree Jackson (born 1997), American football player
- Vincent Jackson (1983–2021), American football player
- William Jackson III (born 1992), American football player
- Willie Jackson (American football) (born 1971), American football player

==== Ice hockey ====
- Art Jackson (1915–1971), NHL professional hockey player
- Harvey Busher Jackson (1911–1966), Canadian ice hockey player
- Jeff Jackson (ice hockey, born 1955), American ice hockey coach
- Jeff Jackson (ice hockey, born 1965), Canadian NHL hockey player
- Jim Jackson (ice hockey) (born 1960), Canadian ice hockey player
- Les Jackson (ice hockey) (born 1952), Canadian hockey executive
- Todd Jackson (born 1981), American ice hockey player

==== Rugby ====
- Dirk Jackson (1885–1976), South African rugby union player and cricketer
- Frederick Stanley Jackson (died 1957), Cornish rugby union player
- Glen Jackson (rugby union) (born 1975), New Zealand rugby union player and referee
- Josh Jackson (rugby league) (born 1991), Australian Rugby League player
- Lee Jackson (rugby league), British rugby league footballer
- Paddy Jackson, Irish rugby union footballer
- Paul Jackson (rugby league) (born 1978), English rugby league footballer
- Peter Jackson (rugby league) (1964–1997), Australian rugby league footballer
- Peter Jackson (rugby union) (1930–2004), British rugby union footballer
- Phil Jackson (rugby league, born 1932), British rugby player
- Rob Jackson (born 1981), English rugby league player
- Ruaridh Jackson (born 1988), Scottish rugby union player
- Steve Jackson (rugby league) (born 1965), Australian rugby league player

==== Other sports ====
- Ashley Jackson (born 1987), English hockey player
- Bob Jackson (swimmer) (born 1957), American swimmer
- Emma Jackson (born 1991), Australian triathlete
- Eugene Jackson (born 1966), American mixed martial artist
- Ezekiel Jackson (born 1978), the ring name of Guyanese-American professional wrestler Rycklon Stephens
- Francia Jackson (born 1975), Dominican Republic volleyball player
- Gus Jackson (1903–1968), New Zealand rower
- Jamea Jackson (born 1986), American tennis player
- Jeremy Jackson (fighter) (born 1982), American martial artist
- Jim Jackson (sportscaster) (born 1963), American sportscaster
- Jimmy Jackson (driver) (1910–1984), American racecar driver
- Jimmy Jackson (wrestler) (1956–2008), Canadian-American wrestler
- Johnnie O. Jackson (born 1971), American bodybuilder
- Joseph Jackson (sport shooter) (1880–1960), American sports shooter
- Keith Jackson (1928–2018), longtime American sportscaster on ABC
- Larry Jackson (racing driver) (born 1974), Canadian racing driver
- Laurence Jackson (1900–1984), Scottish curler
- Linda Jackson (cyclist) (born 1958), Canadian cyclist
- Mat Jackson (born 1981), English racing driver
- Peter Jackson (table tennis) (born 1964), New Zealand table tennis player
- Peter H. Jackson (1913–1983), British rower
- Quinton Jackson (born 1978), American mixed martial arts fighter
- Scoop Jackson (writer) (born 1963), American sports journalist
- Sheila Jackson (born 1957), English chess master
- Trina Jackson (born 1977), American freestyle swimmer
- William Jackson (curler) (1871–1955), Scottish curler

=== Visual arts and design ===
- Arthur C. Jackson (1866–1941), American architect
- Ashley Jackson (born 1940), British painter
- Edward Jackson (photographer) (1885–1967), American photographer
- Hazel Brill Jackson (1894–1991), American sculptor
- Herb Jackson (born 1945), American abstract painter
- Jack Jackson (1941–2006), American cartoonist with pen name Jaxon
- John Jackson (painter) (1778–1831), British painter
- Lily Irene Jackson (1848–1928), American artist
- Leon Quincy Jackson (1926/1927–1995), American architect and professor
- Mason Jackson (1819–1903), British wood-engraver
- May Howard Jackson (1877–1931), African-American sculptor
- Muriel Amy Jackson (1902–1989), English artist, illustrator
- Nicola Jackson (artist) (born 1960), New Zealand artist
- Oliver Lee Jackson (born 1935), African American painter, printmaker, sculptor, and educator
- Philip Jackson (sculptor) (born 1944), Scottish sculptor
- Raymond Jackson ("JAK") (1927–1997), English cartoonist
- Richard Jackson (artist) (born 1939), American artist
- Robert C. Jackson (born 1964), American painter and author
- Robert H. Jackson (photographer) (born 1935), American photographer
- Samuel Jackson (artist) (1794–1869), English artist
- Ted Jackson (born 1955), American photographer
- Vanessa Jackson (born 1953), English artist
- William Henry Jackson (1843–1942), American artist and photographer
- Zig Jackson (born 1957), American photographer

=== Other ===
- Adre-Anna Jackson, American female murder victim
- Alan Jackson (broadcaster) (1915–1976), American radio broadcaster
- Alan Jackson (poet) (born 1938), Scottish poet
- Andrew Jackson, Sr. (died 1767), father of U.S. president Andrew Jackson
- Sir Anthony Jackson (1599–1666), English lawyer and soldier, supporter of Kings Charles I of England and Charles II of England
- Ashley Jackson, British historian
- Autumn Jackson (born 1973), American criminal
- Cecelia Miksekwe Jackson (1922–2011), Bodéwademi elder who preserved her native language
- Charles H. Jackson, Jr. (1898–1978), American rancher, investor and polo player
- Charles James Jackson (1849–1923), British businessman
- Charles R. Jackson (1902–1968), American writer
- Charles Samuel Jackson (1860–1924), American newspaper publisher
- Charlie Jackson (software) (born 1948), American software entrepreneur
- Cindy Jackson (born 1955), Guinness World Record holder for having the most cosmetic procedures
- Cummins Jackson (1802–1849), uncle of Confederate general Stonewall Jackson
- David Edward Jackson (1788–1837), American explorer
- David Noyes Jackson (1922–2001), American writer
- Donald Dean Jackson (1919–1987), American historian
- Douglas Jackson (businessman) (born 1957), American businessman
- Sir Edward Jackson (diplomat) (1925–2002), British diplomat
- Edward Jackson (manufacturer) (1799–1872), Canadian businessman
- Eleanor Jackson Piel (1920–2022), American lawyer
- Elton Manning Jackson (born 1956), American convicted murderer and suspected serial killer
- Emelia Jackson (born 1989), Australian pastry chef
- Esther Cooper Jackson (1917–2022), African-American civil rights activist and social worker
- Sir Geoffrey Jackson (1915–1987), British diplomat
- Sir Gordon Jackson (businessman) (1924–1991), Australian businessman
- Rev. Dr. H. Dale Jackson (1930–2003), American clergyman, denominational leader and ethicist
- Hal Jackson (1914–2012), American DJ and radio personality
- Harold Charles LeBaron (HCL) Jackson (1894-1954), American writer
- Harvey Jackson III (born 1943), American historian
- Helen Hunt Jackson (1830–1885), American novelist and poet
- Henry Jackson (businessman) (born 1964), British-American businessman and investor
- Sir Henry Moore Jackson (1849–1908), British colonial governor
- Holbrook Jackson (1874–1948), British writer
- Holly Jackson, British writer
- Honoré Jackson (1861–1952), Canadian revolutionary
- Jacob Green Jackson (1817–1901), American lumberman
- Jennifer Jackson (model) (born 1945), first African-American Playmate of the Month, March 1965 Playboy
- Jennifer Lyn Jackson (born 1969), Playmate of the Month, April 1989 Playboy
- Jeremy Jackson (author), American author
- Joe Jackson, Sr. (1873–1942), Austrian clown
- John Jackson (bishop) (1811–1886), English bishop
- John Edward Jackson (antiquarian) (1805–1891), English clergyman, antiquary, and archivist
- John G. Jackson (writer) (1907–1993), American historian and writer
- Jonathan P. Jackson (1953–1970), brother of Black Panther George Jackson and instigator of 1970 Marin County Courthouse incident
- Joseph H. Jackson (c. 1905–1990), American clergyman
- Kenneth H. Jackson (1909–1991), English linguist
- MacDonald P. Jackson (born 1938), New Zealand academic
- Margery Jackson (1722–1812), English miser, litigant, landlady and local character of Carlisle
- Mary Jane Jackson (1837–1897), American serial killer
- Michael Jackson (Anglican bishop) (born 1956), Irish bishop
- Michael Jackson (journalist), Niuean journalist
- Michael Jackson (radio commentator) (1934–2022), American radio commentator
- Michael Jackson (writer) (1942–2007), British journalist
- Mick Jackson (author) (born 1960), British author
- Oliver Toussaint Jackson (1862–1948), American businessman
- Patrick Tracy Jackson (1780–1847), Boston merchant
- Paul Jackson (poker player) (born c. 1965), English poker player
- Peter Jackson (academic), Australian academic
- Peter Jackson (fashion designer) (1928–2008), Australian fashion designer
- Peter Jackson (historian), British historian
- Rachel Jackson (1767–1828), wife of U.S. president Andrew Jackson
- Rebecca Cox Jackson (1795–1871), African-American religious activist
- Richard Jackson (artist) (born 1939), American artist
- Sir Robert Jackson (UN administrator) (1911–1991), Australian administrator for the United Nations
- Robin Jackson (1948–1998), Northern Irish loyalist and Ulster Volunteer Force leader
- Rupert Jackson (born 1948), Lord Justice of Appeal of England and Wales
- Samuel Macauley Jackson (1851–1912), American clergyman, editor and author
- Sarah Yorke Jackson (1803–1887), daughter-in-law of U.S. president Andrew Jackson
- Seath Jackson (1996–2011), American murder victim
- Sheldon Jackson (1934–1909), American Presbyterian clergyman and missionary
- Shirley Jackson (1916–1965), American author
- Steve Jackson (thriller writer) (born 1969), Scottish writer
- Steve Jackson (British game designer) (born 1951), British game designer
- Steve Jackson (American game designer) (born 1953), U.S. game designer
- Valerie Jackson (born 1949), American radio host, widow of Atlanta mayor Maynard Jackson
- Vickie Dawn Jackson (born 1966), American serial killer
- William Jackson (Canadian administrator)
- William Jackson (gangster) (1920–1961), American mobster
- William Jackson (minister) (1818–1900), American minister
- William Jackson (pirate) (fl. 1639–1645), English pirate
- William Turrentine Jackson (1915–2000), American historian

== Multiple people with the same given name ==
- Anthony Jackson (disambiguation)
- Austin Jackson (disambiguation)
- Chris Jackson (disambiguation)
- Dane Jackson (disambiguation)
- Daniel Jackson (disambiguation)
- Jordan Jackson (disambiguation)
- Matthew Jackson (disambiguation)
- Michael Jackson (disambiguation)
- Theo Jackson (disambiguation)
- Thomas Jackson (disambiguation)
- Tim Jackson (disambiguation), including Timothy Jackson

== Fictional characters ==
=== Surname ===
- Alan Jackson, a fictional character in the British soap opera EastEnders
- Alan Jackson, a character in The Sarah Jane Adventures
- Bianca Jackson, a fictional character in the British soap opera EastEnders
- Billie Jackson, a fictional character in the British soap opera EastEnders
- Blossom Jackson, a fictional character in the British soap opera EastEnders
- Carol Jackson, a fictional character in the British soap opera EastEnders
- Bex Fowler, a fictional character in the British soap opera EastEnders
- Kai Jackson, a fictional character in the British soap opera EastEnders
- Maria Jackson, a character in The Sarah Jane Adventures
- Percy Jackson, the main protagonist and narrator of Percy Jackson & the Olympians and later also appears as one of the main characters in the Heroes of Olympus spinoff series
- Sgt. Jericho Jackson, title character of the film Action Jackson
- Jill and Jan Jackson, title characters of the American comic strip The Jackson Twins
- Robbie Jackson, a fictional character in the British soap opera EastEnders

== See also ==
- Justice Jackson (disambiguation)
- Jackson (given name)
- Jacksen, given name
- Jacson, given name and surname
- Jaxon (name), given name and surname
- Jaxson, given name
- Jack (name)
