= Thomas Jackson =

Thomas, Tom, or Tommy Jackson may refer to:

== Academics ==
- Thomas H. Jackson (born 1950), ninth president of the University of Rochester
- Tom Jackson Jr. (born 1959), president of Black Hills State University, South Dakota
- Thom Jackson (Thomas Matthew Jackson, born 1960), American educational entrepreneur

== Arts and entertainment ==
- Thomas Jackson (architect) (1807–1890), Irish architect
- Thomas R. Jackson (1826–1901), English-born American architect
- Thomas Graham Jackson (1835–1924), architect
- Thomas Jackson (author), author of the 1905 book The Lost Squire of Inglewood
- Thomas Jackson (actor) (1886–1967), American actor in Manhattan Melodrama
- Tommy Jackson (musician) (1926–1979), American country music fiddle player
- Tom Jackson (actor) (born 1948), Canadian Métis actor and singer

== Military ==
- Stonewall Jackson (Thomas Jonathan Jackson, 1824–1863), Confederate general
  - Thomas Jonathan Jackson (sculpture), a 1921 bronze equestrian sculpture of Stonewall Jackson
- Thomas Sturges Jackson (1842–1934), Royal Navy officer
- Thomas Jackson (Royal Navy officer) (1868–1945), Royal Navy officer
- Thomas Norman Jackson (1897–1918), English soldier, Victoria Cross recipient

== Politics and government ==
- Thomas Witter Jackson, chief justice of Jamaica, 1818–21
- Thomas B. Jackson (1797–1881), U.S. representative from New York
- Thomas Hughes Jackson (1834–1930), mayor of Birkenhead
- Thomas Wesley Jackson (1859–1934), Canadian politician
- T. A. Jackson (communist) (a.k.a. Tommy Jackson, 1879–1955), socialist and Communist leader
- Thomas A. Jackson (Wisconsin politician) (1829–1908), American politician in Wisconsin
- Thomas Jackson (trade unionist) (a.k.a. Tom Jackson, 1925–2003), British labour rights organizer
- Thomas Penfield Jackson (1937–2013), U.S. district court judge for the District of Columbia
- Thomas Jackson (Alabama politician) (born 1949), member of the Alabama House of Representatives
- Thomas Jackson (abolitionist) (1807–1878)

== Religion ==
- Thomas Jackson (theologian) (1579–1640), English theologian, and President of Corpus Christi College, Oxford
- Thomas Jackson (minister) (1783–1873), English Wesleyan Methodist minister and writer
- Thomas Jackson (bishop-designate of Lyttelton) (1812–1886), of Lyttelton, New Zealand

== Sports ==
=== American football ===
- Tom Jackson (American football, born 1948) (1948–2025), American football player and coach, head football coach at the University of Connecticut (1983–1993)
- Tom Jackson (American football, born 1951) (1951–2026), ESPN analyst and former American football player
- T. J. Jackson (defensive tackle) (born 1983), American football player from Alabama

=== Association football ===
- Thomas Jackson (footballer, born 1876) (1876–1954), English footballer
- Tom Jackson (footballer, born 1878) (1878–1916), footballer for St. Mirren and Scotland
- Thomas Jackson (footballer, born 1896) (1896–?), English footballer who played for Burnley and Dundee
- Tommy Jackson (footballer, born 1898) (1898–1975), footballer for Aston Villa
- Tommy Jackson (footballer, born 1946), Northern Irish former footballer, played for Everton, Nottingham Forest and Manchester United

=== Other sports ===
- Thomas Jackson (basketball) (born 1980), American basketball player
- Tom Jackson (Australian footballer) (1881–1929), Australian footballer for Melbourne
- Tommy Jackson (Australian footballer) (1885–1966), Australian footballer for St Kilda
- Tom Jackson (rugby union) (1870–1952), Welsh rugby union international
- Thomas Jackson (athlete) (1884–1967), American track and field athlete
- Tommy Jackson (boxer) (1931–1982), heavyweight boxer

== Others ==
- Sir Thomas Jackson, 1st Baronet (1841–1915), first chief manager of Hong Kong and Shanghai Banking Corporation
- Thomas Horatio Jackson (1879–1935), Nigerian newspaper editor and publisher
- Thomas Jackson (physicist) (1773–1837), Scottish physicist
- Thomas John Jackson (1792–1852), free African-American slave
- Thomas H. Jackson (born 1950), American legal scholar
- Thomas Herbert Elliot Jackson (1903–1968), English coffee farmer in Kenya, British Army officer and entomologist
