= Anthony Wayne Bridge =

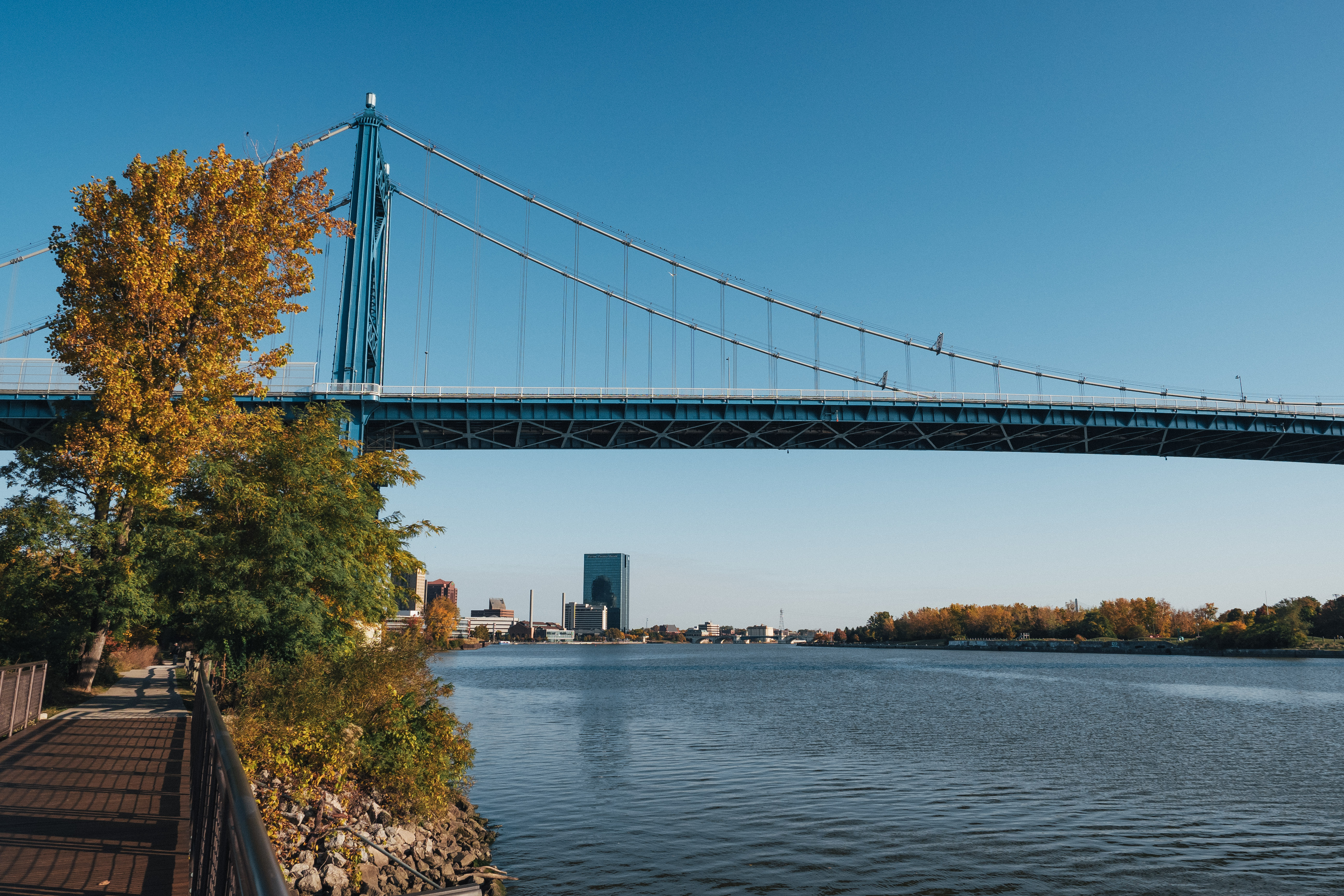
- Anthony Wayne Bridge crossing the Maumee River
- Coordinates: 41°38′27.8″N 83°32′0.5″W
- Carries: SR 2 / SR 51 / SR 65
- Crosses: Maumee River
- Locale: Toledo, Ohio

Characteristics
- Design: Suspension bridge
- Material: Steel
- Total length: 3,215 ft (979.9 m)
- Width: 60 ft (18.3 m)
- Longest span: 1,252 ft (381.6 m)

History
- Engineering design by: Waddell and Hardesty
- Constructed by: McClintic-Marshall Company
- Construction end: 1931

Location
- Interactive map of Anthony Wayne Bridge

The Anthony Wayne Bridge, commonly called the High Level Bridge, and is a downtown Toledo, Ohio landmark named after General Anthony Wayne. It is a suspension bridge that spans the Maumee River.

The bridge has some features that give it a unique aesthetic quality, including a sky blue color and various lattice patterns. The overall structure of this bridge was built by the McClintic-Marshall Company, which is the same company that built the Ambassador Bridge in Detroit. Waddell and Hardesty were consulting engineers on its design.

Ohio State Routes 2, 51, and 65 cross the Maumee River on the Anthony Wayne Bridge; it also connects Clayton Street to Woodville Road.

The bridge was designated a historic civil engineering landmark by the Toledo chapter of the American Society of Civil Engineers in 2022.

== Construction ==
The Anthony Wayne Bridge construction cost the city of Toledo three-million dollars and passed city council 15–2 before being a citywide ballot in November 1928. In October 1929, Mayor W. T. Jackson broke ground on the project once on both sides of the Maumee River to a crowd of over 500 people.

Its construction became a local and national spectacle in 1930 as the two largest steel girders made in the world were hoisted above the river and put in place, they each measured 154 feet long and 12 foot high weighing 83 tons each. Construction lasted two years and 27 days breaking records on suspension bridge construction at the time. Over 40,000 people would attend the celebrations of the bridge's opening 1931.

As the bridge construction was nearing its end, the city found itself without a name as public outrage railed against the naming of the bridge after scandalized former U.S. President Warren G. Harding. During these years the bridge went by the colloquial "High Level Bridge" A committee was set to name the bridge, ultimately choosing the name High Level Bridge, which upset many including the city council which reversed course and named the bridge Anthony Wayne. The mayor refused to sign off on the new name letting city council's naming motion become official without his signature.

Five years after the bridge opening in the amidst of the Great Depression the city was unable to continue payments on the bridge's construction and was sued for payment on its world famous steel girders. The city had to pass an additional bond issue to continue payments.

== Reconstruction and dehumidification project ==
In April 2012, the city of Toledo and the Ohio Department of Transportation announced a project that would close the bridge to traffic for nearly 2 years. The redevelopment project took nearly 3 years to complete and reopened in October 2015.

During this process a bridge cable dehumidification system was added to the main cables to prevent corrosion, the fourth such installation of a dehumidification system in the United States and the first to be completed in Ohio.

The Toledo Arts Commission raised over $900,000 for new LED lighting to be installed on the bridge after its planned reconstruction ended. The new lighting was unveiled in 2019 and was designed by Austrian-born artist Erwin Redl.

== Images ==
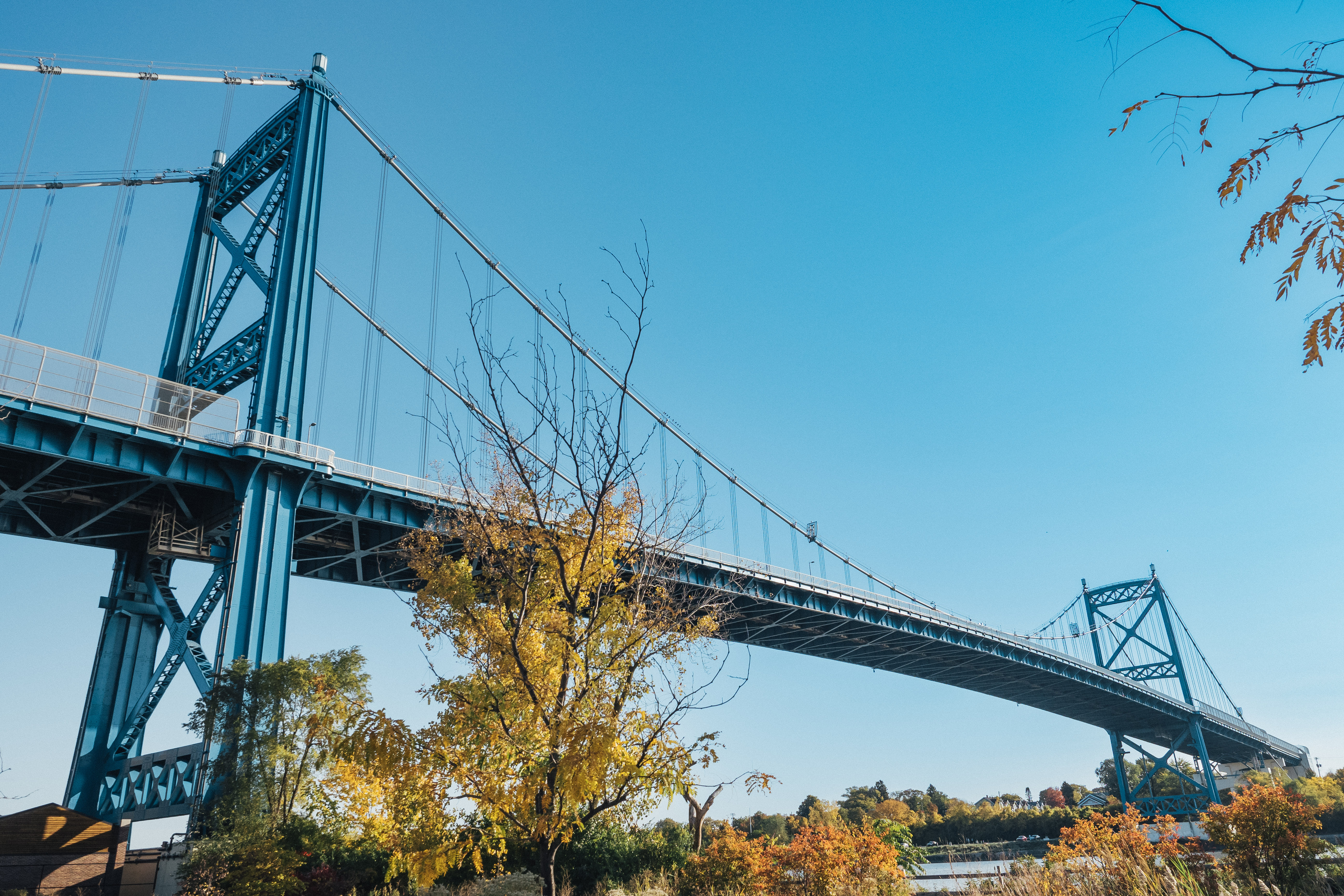
Anthony Wayne Bridge, Toledo, OH in 2022

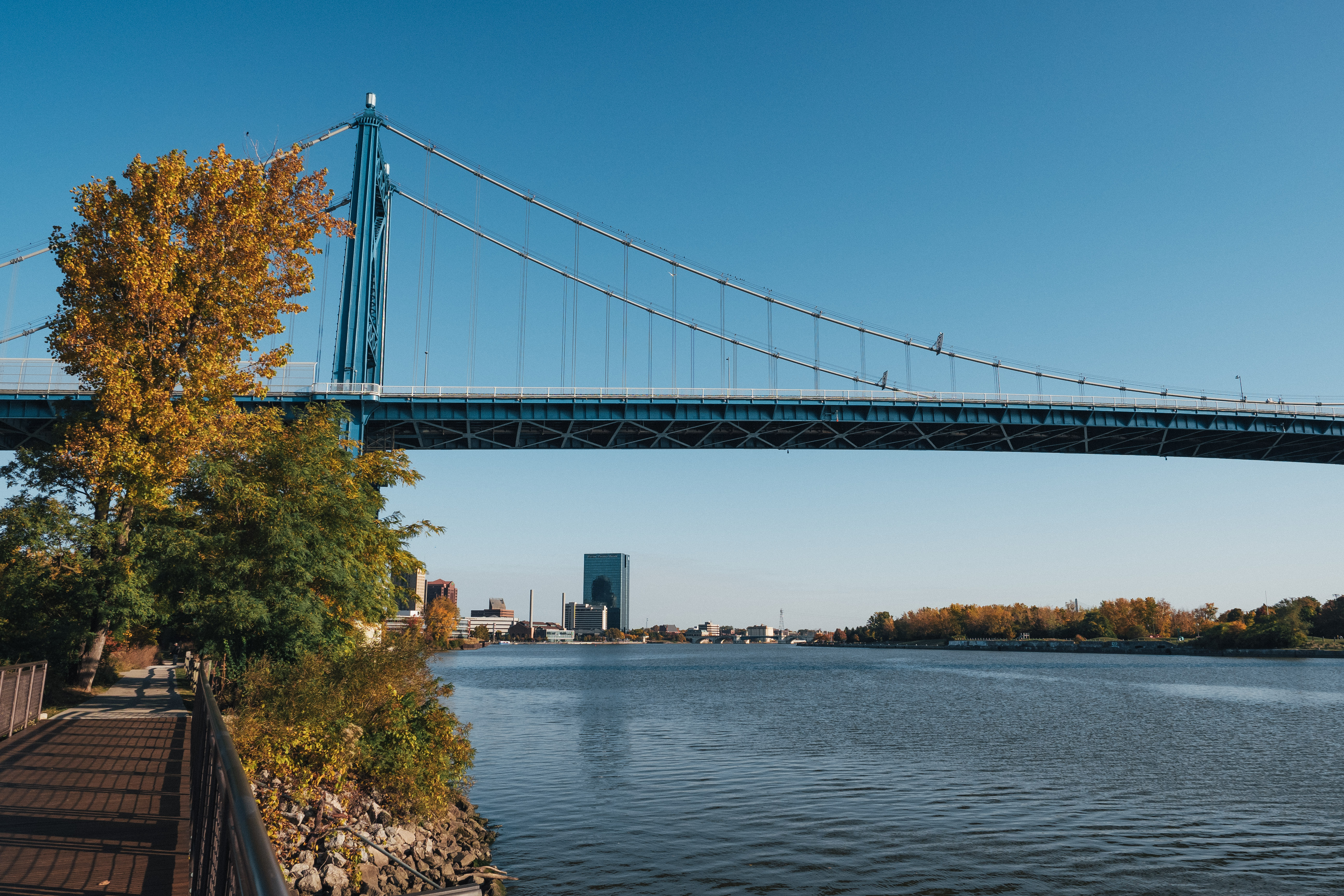
Anthony Wayne Bridge, Toledo, OH in 2022

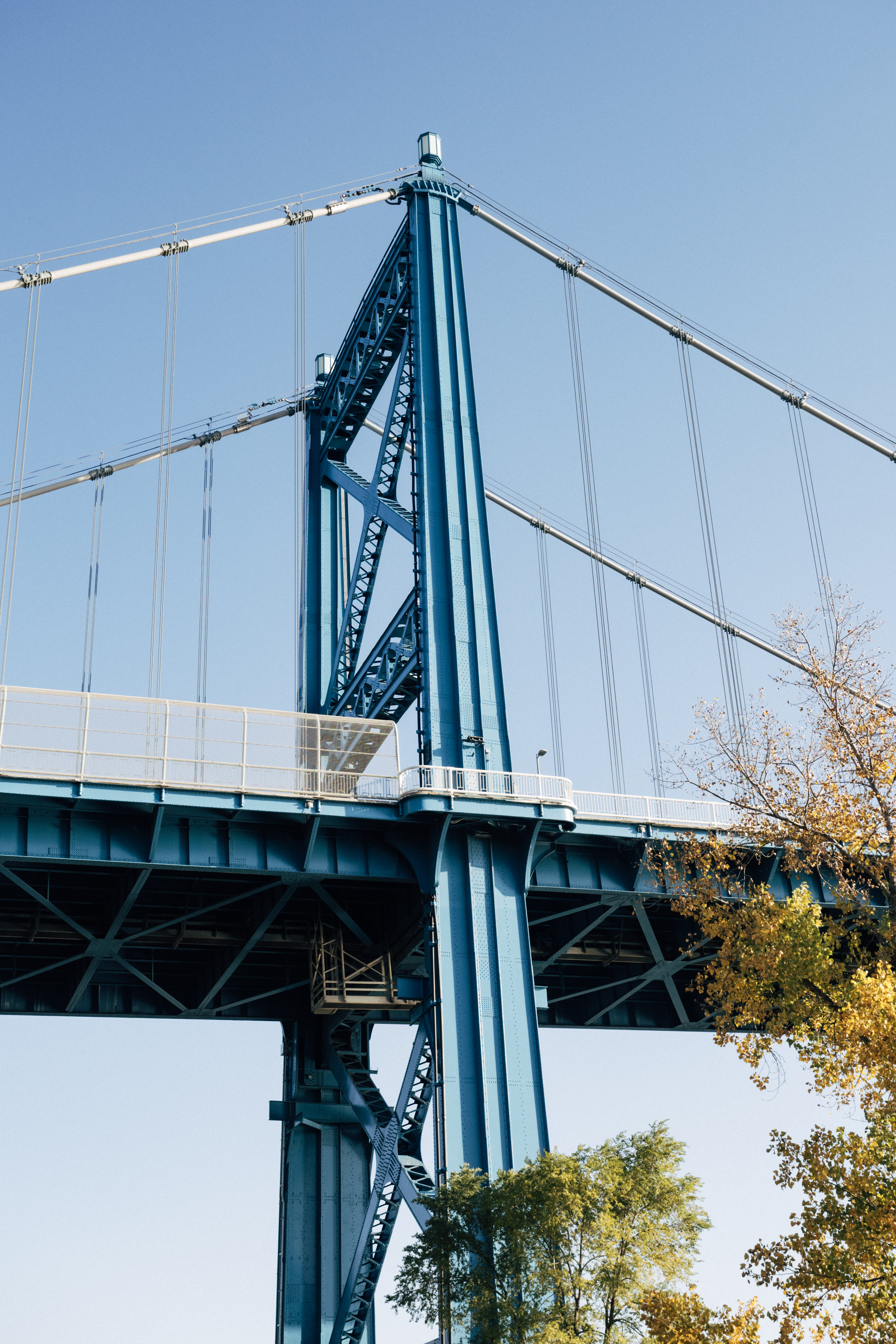
Anthony Wayne Bridge, Toledo, OH in 2022

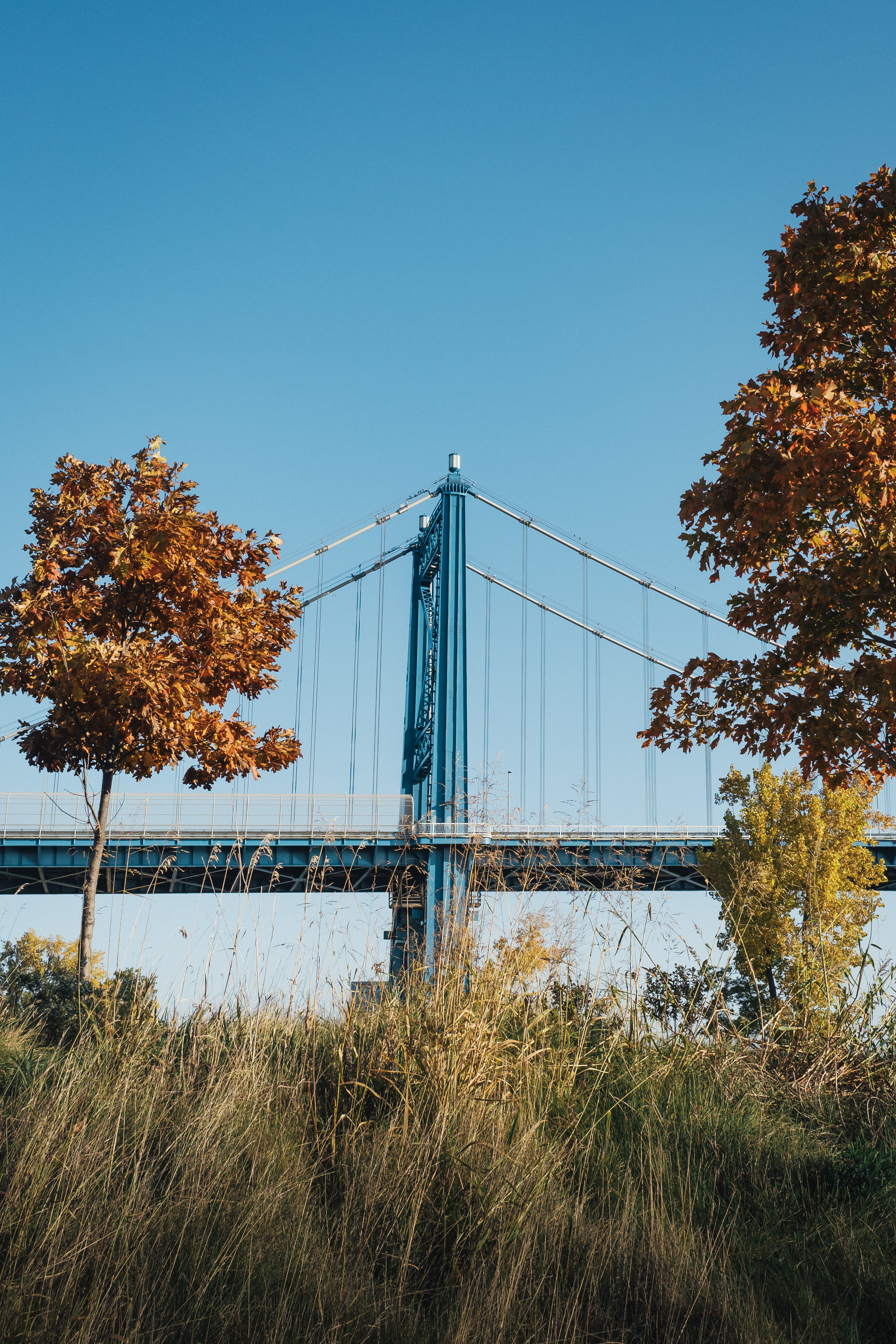
Anthony Wayne Bridge, Toledo, OH in 2022

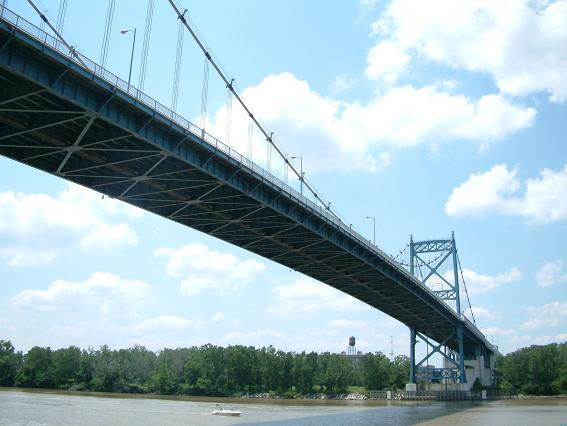
Anthony Wayne Bridge, Toledo, OH in 2009

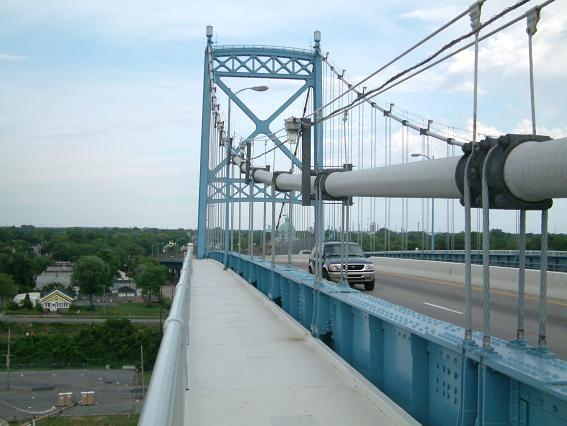
Anthony Wayne Bridge Deck in 2003

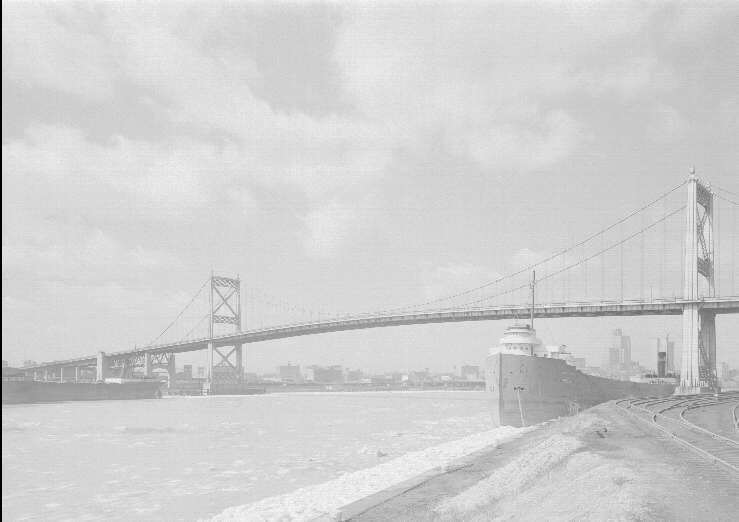
Anthony Wayne Bridge approximately 1920

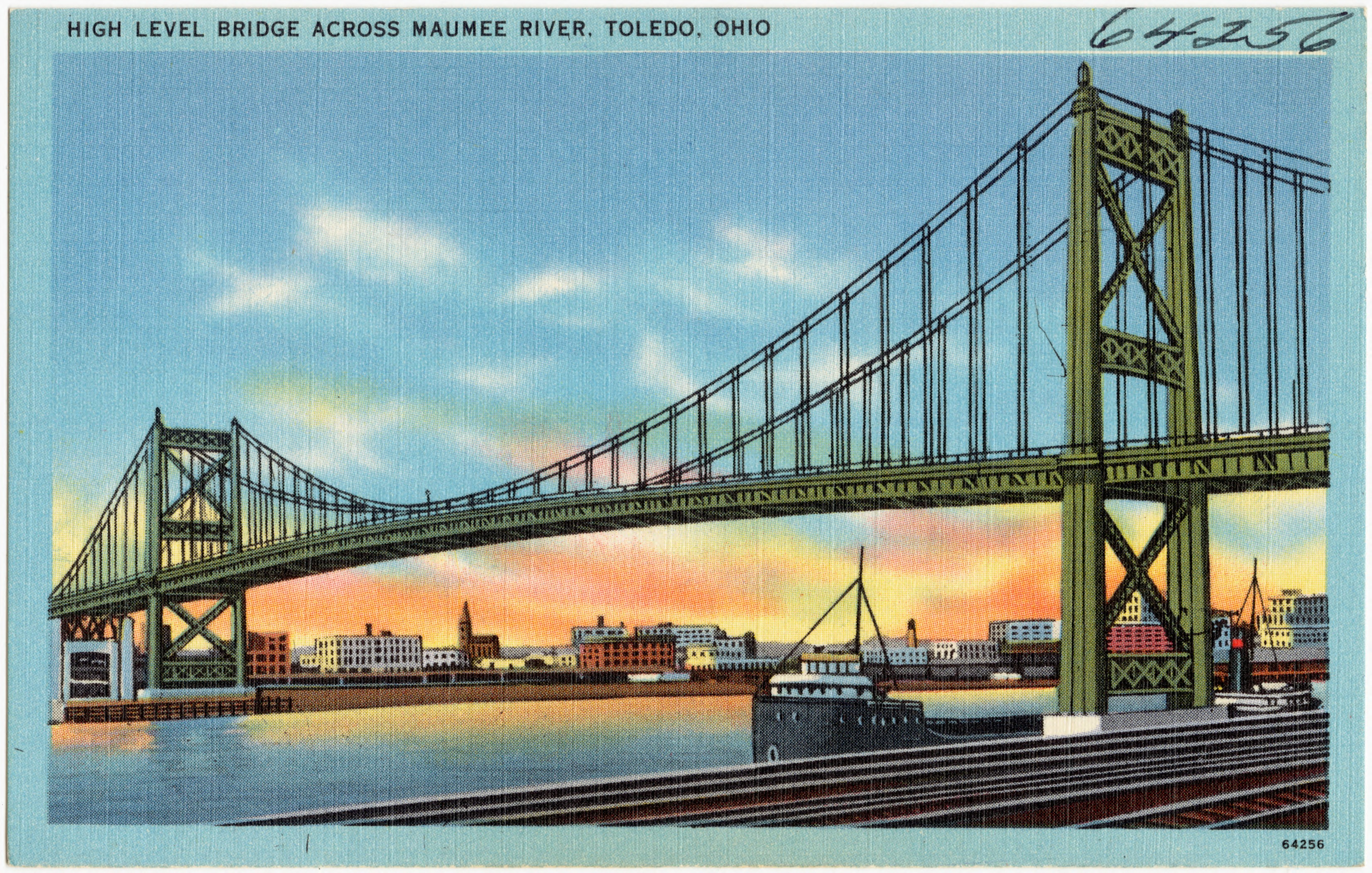
Postcard from the 1940s

== Dimensions ==
- Deck width: 60 feet (18 m)
- Roadway width: 54 feet (16 m)
- Structure length: 3,215 feet (980 m)
- Center span: 785 feet (239 m)
- Total suspended length: 1,252 feet (382 m)
