= Braulio Marcelo Castillo =

American murderer

- Citizenship: United States
- Education: U.S. Military Academy Preparatory School; University of San Diego
- Occupation: Information technology
- Criminal charges: Murder

Braulio Marcelo Castillo (born 1967) is the former CEO of Strong Castle, a defunct information technology company based in Virginia.

In 2012, he was the subject of widespread controversy after it was revealed his company had received $500 million in government contracts due to his claimed veteran status, which consisted of ten months spent at the U.S. Military Academy Preparatory School before he dropped out after injuring his ankle playing football.

As of 2024, he is serving a life prison sentence at Buckingham Correctional Center for murder.

== Early life and education ==
Braulio Castillo attended the U.S. Military Academy Preparatory School (USMAPS), then located in New Jersey, for one year before dropping out following an ankle injury he suffered. Castillo variously claimed the injury occurred while playing football or while on a field exercise.

U.S. Military Academy Preparatory School students are formally enlisted in the U.S. Army as "invitational reservists", a status that permits them to voluntarily withdraw at any point prior to matriculation to the U.S. Military Academy at West Point without incurring any financial or service obligation. The preparatory school is operated for potential West Point cadets who lack the academic aptitude to immediately enroll in the U.S. Military Academy, but who have otherwise qualified for entry due to nomination by a dignitary. According to a later Time story about Castillo, the military academy prep school system is generally perceived of as a "scam", an opinion echoed by Joe Nocera.

After dropping out of USMAPS, Castillo enrolled at the University of San Diego where he was a linebacker on the school's football team.

== Career ==
In 2012, Castillo purchased Signet Computers, an information technology firm, later renaming it Strong Castle. He served as the company's CEO.

=== IRS contracts and controversy over veteran, HUBZone status ===
After becoming CEO of Strong Castle, Castillo applied for – and received – veteran preference in federal government contracting for Strong Castle. According to his application to the Small Business Administration, Castillo averred that he could not enjoy long walks with family members due to his ankle injury, describing it as a cross "that I bear due to my service to our great country". The veteran designation helped Strong Castle win $500 million in contracts from the Internal Revenue Service (IRS).

Castillo was called to testify before the United States House Committee on Oversight and Accountability, during the course of which United States Senator Tammy Duckworth, a paraplegic veteran, sarcastically chided him: "I'm so glad you would be willing to play football in prep-school again to protect this great country". In its final report, the committee questioned the severity of Castillo's injury, noting that he played competitive football for several years after receiving it.

According to the committee's report:

Braulio Castillo would not have been considered a veteran had he completed his year at USMAPS without injury. Normally, a cadet is not considered a veteran until he or she graduates from West Point, enters active duty, and subsequently leaves active duty. Time spent at USMAPS and West Point is considered training, not active duty. However, if a person is injured at either school, he or she becomes a veteran due to the service-connected disability. This policy is codified with respect to service at the academies, and is extended in the Code of Federal Regulations to include prep schools.

Castillo also operated an office for Strong Castle in a disadvantaged neighborhood that would allow the company to obtain HUBZone tax credits, however, investigators later said they made several visits to the office and never found anyone there, suggesting that employee timesheets had been manipulated to falsely make it appear employees were working at the location. Castillo denied any wrongdoing, stating "we have never received any improper preferential treatment and have competed fairly for every contract that we have received".

== Murder of spouse ==
In 2014, Castillo murdered his wife, Michelle, then staged the homicide scene to make it appear like a suicide. At the time, Castillo was embroiled in a contentious divorce with his spouse and the two were living separately, with Michelle Castillo having obtained a restraining order against her husband after alleging physical abuse. Michelle Castillo was reportedly seeking $168,000 of annual alimony and child support from Braulio Castillo as part of the divorce.

Braulio Castillo accomplished the murder by smothering and bludgeoning Michelle Castillo in bed, then dragging her corpse downstairs to a lower level bathroom where he hanged it from a noose.

According to testimony provided at trial from Castillo's 11-year-old son, his father bribed him with gold to obtain the code to the residence's security alarm, though the son was unaware of the reason Castillo wanted access to the home. In addition, Castillo's younger son had been in the residence on the night of the murder and testified to seeing his father present in the home, despite Castillo claiming not to have been inside the house for a year. Finally, Castillo's DNA was discovered on the shirt Michelle Castillo was wearing when her body was discovered.

In a later letter to his father, the older Castillo child declared "I know you did it, you know you did it, we all know you did it". Castillo was given a life prison sentence. As of 2024, he is incarcerated at Buckingham Correctional Center.

== Personal life ==
With Michelle, Castillo has five biological and adopted children. Prior to his incarceration, he was active in McLean Bible Church.
