= Steve Jackson =

Steve Jackson may refer to:

- Steve Jackson (running back) (born 1983), American football running back
- Steve Jackson (mathematician) (fl. 2000s), American set theorist at University of North Texas
- Steve Jackson (British game designer) (born 1951), co-founder, with Ian Livingstone, of Games Workshop and Fighting Fantasy
- Steve Jackson (American game designer) (born 1953), founder of Steve Jackson Games in the early 1980s
- Stevie Jackson (born 1969), Scottish musician and member of the band Belle & Sebastian
- Steve Jackson (rugby league) (born 1965), Australian rugby league footballer
- Steve Jackson (thriller writer) (born 1969), created MI6 spy, Paul Aston
- Steve Jackson (linebacker) (born 1942), American football linebacker
- Steve Jackson (defensive back) (born 1969), American football defensive back
- Steve Jackson (rugby union) (born 1973), New Zealand rugby union player and coach

== See also ==
- Steven Jackson (disambiguation) - including Stephen Jackson disambiguations
