= Anthony Jackson =

Anthony Jackson may refer to:

- Anthony Jackson (musician) (1952–2025), American electric bass player
- Anthony Jackson (actor) (1944–2006), English actor
- Sir Anthony Jackson (soldier) (1599–1666), English lawyer, soldier and knight
- Anthony Jackson-Hamel (born 1993), Canadian soccer player
- Sir Anthony Mather-Jackson (1899–1983), British cricketer
- Anthony Jackson (paediatrician) (1918–2005), British paediatrician, pioneer in the management of cystic fibrosis
- Anthony Tyson Jackson (born 1986), American football defensive end

== See also ==
- Tony Jackson (disambiguation)
