= Steven Jackson (disambiguation) =

Steven Jackson (born 1983) is an American former football player who was a running back for the Atlanta Falcons and St. Louis Rams.

Steven or Stephen Jackson may also refer to:

== Sports ==
- Steve Jackson (footballer) (1890–1917), English footballer
- Stephen Jackson (canoeist) (born 1956), British sprint canoer
- Stephen Jackson (born 1978), basketball player
- Steven Jackson (baseball) (born 1982), American pitcher
- Steven Jackson (fullback) (born 1984), American football fullback, free agent who played for Minnesota Vikings, Carolina Panthers, Denver Broncos and Kansas City Chiefs

== Others ==
- Stephen Jackson (scientist) (born 1962), British biologist
- Stephen Jackson (musician) (born 1970), American singer-songwriter for the Pietasters
- Stephen Jackson, former director of the BBC Symphony Chorus from 1989 to 2015

== See also ==
- Stevan Jackson (born 1970), Australian footballer
- Stefon Jackson (born 1985), American basketball player
- Steve Jackson (disambiguation)
