= Eddie Jackson =

Eddie Jackson is the name of:

- Eddie Jackson (chef) (born 1980), American NFL safety and Food Network host
- Eddie Jackson (safety) (born 1993), American football player
- Edward Jackson (footballer) (1925–1996), Australian rules footballer who played with Melbourne in the Victorian Football League
- Eddie Jackson (musician) (born 1961), American bassist from Queensrÿche
- Eddie Jackson (singer) (1926–2002), American country and rockabilly singer
- Eddie Lee Jackson (1949–2020), American politician; Democratic member of the Illinois House of Representatives
- Eddie Jackson (vaudeville) (1896–1980), American vaudeville and Broadway performer

== See also ==
- Edward Jackson (disambiguation)
- Edwin Jackson (disambiguation)
