= J. J. Jackson =

J. J. Jackson may refer to:

- J. J. Jackson (singer) (born 1942), American soul/R&B singer from New York City
- J. J. Jackson (media personality) (1939–2004), American radio and television personality

== See also ==
- Jackson (name)
