= Erwin Redl =

Erwin Redl (born 1963) in Gföhl, Lower Austria is an Austrian-born artist currently living in the United States. As artistic medium, he uses LEDs. His work includes installations, videos, graphics, computerart, and electronic music.

== Life and work ==
Redl studied electronic music and composition at the University of Music and Performing Arts, Vienna. Then he moved to New York City, where he studied Computer Art at the School of Visual Arts; he graduated in 1995. With his artwork Matrix VI, he lit the face of the Whitney Museum of American Art in New York during the Whitney Biennial 2002. His works, some of them are named Matrix, were shown in New York, Germany, France, Austria, and Korea. The installation called Fade I allows visitors to move into lit spaces. This installation was shown in Lille, France, as part of Lille 2004 (fr) - European Capital of Culture, where it animated the Eglise Sainte-Marie Madeleine (fr). Erwin Redl's Nocturnal Flow has been installed in the Paul G. Allen Center. The artwork, an 85-foot brick column at the west end of the atrium, was chosen by the Washington State Arts Commission. It was supported by the Washington State's Art in Public Places Program.

Erwin Redl lives and works in New York with a separate studio in Bowling Green, Ohio.

== Public collections ==
- Anthony Wayne Bridge Toledo, Ohio
- ACE GALLERY Los Angeles,
- C3 Budapest, Budapest, Hungary
- Niederösterreichisches Landesmuseum, St. Pölten, Austria
