= Edward Jackson =

Edward or Ed Jackson may refer to:

== Arts and entertainment ==
- Edward Jackson (photographer) (1885–1967), American photographer and photojournalist
- Edward Jackson, a character in the 1914 film The $5,000,000 Counterfeiting Plot
- Ed Jackson (Coronation Street) (fl. 1978), a character in the British soap opera Coronation Street

== Politics and law ==
- Edward B. Jackson (1793–1826), U.S. representative from Virginia
- Edward L. Jackson (1873–1954), American politician, governor of Indiana
- Edward Jackson (diplomat) (1925–2002), British diplomat
- Ed Jackson (Tennessee politician) (born 1948), American businessman and politician in Tennessee state senate
- Sir Edward St John Jackson (1886–1961), British colonial judge and administrator

== Sports ==
- Edward Jackson (cricketer, born 1849) (1849–1926), English cricketer
- Edward L. Jackson (American football) (c. 1907–1984), American college football and college basketball coach and administrator
- Edward Jackson (Delhi cricketer) (1922-2009), Indian cricketer
- Edward Jackson (footballer) (1925–1996), Australian rules footballer in the VFL
- Edward Jackson (cricketer, born 1955) (born 1955), English cricketer
- Ed Jackson (rugby union) (born 1988), English rugby player

== Others ==
- Edward Jackson (manufacturer) (1799–1872), Canadian tinware manufacturer
- Edward Jackson (ophthalmologist), American ophthalmologist

== See also ==
- Eddie Jackson (disambiguation)
- Edwin Jackson (disambiguation)
- Ted Jackson (disambiguation)
