= Ted Jackson (disambiguation) =

Ted Jackson is a photographer.

Ted Jackson may also refer to:

- Ted Jackson, character in The Power and the Glory (1941 film)
- Ted Jackson, character on List of Life of Riley characters

== See also ==
- Edward Jackson (disambiguation)
- Theodore Jackson, drummer with Distorted Pony and other bands
