= Judge Jackson (disambiguation) =

Judge Jackson (1883–1958) was an American sacred harp composer, songwriter, and educator. Judge Jackson may also refer to:

- Amy Berman Jackson (born 1954), judge of the U.S. District Court for the District of Columbia
- Brian A. Jackson (born 1960), judge of the United States District Court for the Middle District of Louisiana
- Carol E. Jackson (born 1952), judge of the United States District Court for the Eastern District of Missouri
- Charles Jackson (judge) (1775–1855), American jurist in Massachusetts
- Helen J. Frye or Helen Jackson (1930–2011), American judge in Oregon
- Howell E. Jackson (1832–1895), judge of the United States Court of Appeals for the Sixth Circuit, later appointed to the U.S. Supreme Court
- James M. Jackson (1825–1901), American lawyer and Democratic politician from West Virginia
- John G. Jackson (politician) (1777–1825), judge of the United States District Court for the Western District of Virginia
- John Jay Jackson Jr. (1824–1907), American lawyer, Whig politician, U.S. District Judge (initially for Virginia, later for the District of West Virginia)
- Joseph Raymond Jackson (1880–1969), judge of the United States Court of Customs and Patent Appeals
- Ketanji Brown Jackson (born 1970), judge on the U.S. Court of Appeals for the District of Columbia Circuit, later appointed to the U.S. Supreme Court
- Lawrence Jackson (judge) (1914–1993), chief justice of the Supreme Court of Western Australia
- Peter Jackson (judge) (born 1955), English Appeal Court judge
- R. Brooke Jackson (born 1947), judge of the U.S. District Court for the District of Colorado
- Raymond Alvin Jackson (born 1949), judge of the United States District Court for the Eastern District of Virginia
- Rupert Jackson (born 1948), justice of the Court of Appeal of England and Wales
- Thomas Penfield Jackson (1937–2013), judge of the U.S. District Court for the District of Columbia
- William H. Jackson (judge) (1864–1938), judge of the United States District Court for the Canal Zone

== See also ==
- Candace Jackson-Akiwumi (born 1979), judge of the U.S. Court of Appeals for the Seventh Circuit
- Justice Jackson (disambiguation)
