= Edwin Jackson =

Edwin Jackson may refer to:

- Edwin Jackson (American football) (1991–2018), American football player
- Edwin Jackson (baseball) (born 1983), American baseball player
- Edwin Jackson (basketball) (born 1989), French basketball player

== See also ==
- Eddie Jackson (disambiguation)
- Edward Jackson (disambiguation)
- Edwin Jackson Kyle
