= Tony Jackson =

Tony Jackson may refer to:

- Tony Jackson (basketball, born 1942) (1942–2005), American basketball player in the ABL and ABA
- Tony Jackson (basketball, born 1958), American basketball player in the NBA
- Tony Jackson (American football) (born 1982), American football fullback
- Tony Jackson (pianist) (1882–1921), American pianist, singer, and composer
- Tony Jackson (singer) (1938–2003), English singer and bass guitarist
- Tony Jackson (died 2001), English singer with the group Rage

== See also ==
- Anthony Jackson (disambiguation)
