= Carol Spackman Moss =

American politician

Member of the Utah House of Representatives
- Incumbent
- Assumed office January 1, 2001
- Preceded by: Ray Short
- Succeeded by: Julie Jackson (elect)
- Constituency: 37th district (2001–2023); 34th district (2023–present)

Personal details
- Party: Democratic Party
- Spouse: Robert
- Education: University of Utah
- Profession: Educator

Carol Spackman Moss is a Democratic member of the Utah State House, representing the state's 34th house district.

== Early life and career ==
Before being elected to the Utah House of Representatives, Moss taught English at Olympus High School in Holladay, Utah (a suburb of Salt Lake City) for nearly 30 years.

Moss has bachelor's and master's degrees from the University of Utah.

== Political career ==
Moss was first elected in 2000. She previously served as the Assistant Minority Whip in the Utah House from 2004 to 2010.

During the 2016 legislative session, Moss served on the Higher Education Appropriations Subcommittee, the House Education Committee, the House Rules Committee, and the House Transportation Committee.

== Elections ==
- 2014 Moss won reelection against Republican nominee Ron Hilton, taking 60.3% of the vote.
- 2010 Moss won reelection against Republican nominee Anne-Marie Lampropoulos, taking 51.6% of the vote.
- 2010 Moss won reelection against Republican nominee Margrethe Peterson, taking 61% of the vote.
- 2008 Moss won reelection against Republican nominee Linda Cooper, taking 63.1% of the vote.
- 2006 Moss won reelection against Republican nominee Sandy Thackeray.
- 2004 Moss won reelection against Republican nominee Brice (Derek) Carsno
- 2002 Moss won reelection against Republican nominee Mark H. Steffensen.
- 2000 Moss was elected, defeating Republican incumbent Ray Short.

== 2016 sponsored legislation ==
Bill number	Bill name	Bill status
HB0066	Online Parenting Course for Divorcing Families	Governor Signed – 3/21/2016
HB0181S01	Physical Control in Schools Amendments	House/ filed – 3/10/2016
HB0184	Unlicensed Direct-entry Midwifery	Governor Signed – 3/21/2016
HB0221S10	Immunization of Students Amendments	House/ filed – 3/10/2016
HB0238S01	Opiate Overdose Response Act—Overdose Outreach Providers and Other Amendments	Governor Signed – 3/23/2016
HCR004	Concurrent Resolution Declaring Drug Overdose Deaths to Be a Public Health Emergency	Governor Signed – 3/18/2016

Moss passed four of the six bills she introduced, giving her a 66.7% passage rate. She also floor sponsored two bills during the 2016 General Session.
