= Robert C. Jackson =

Artist and author

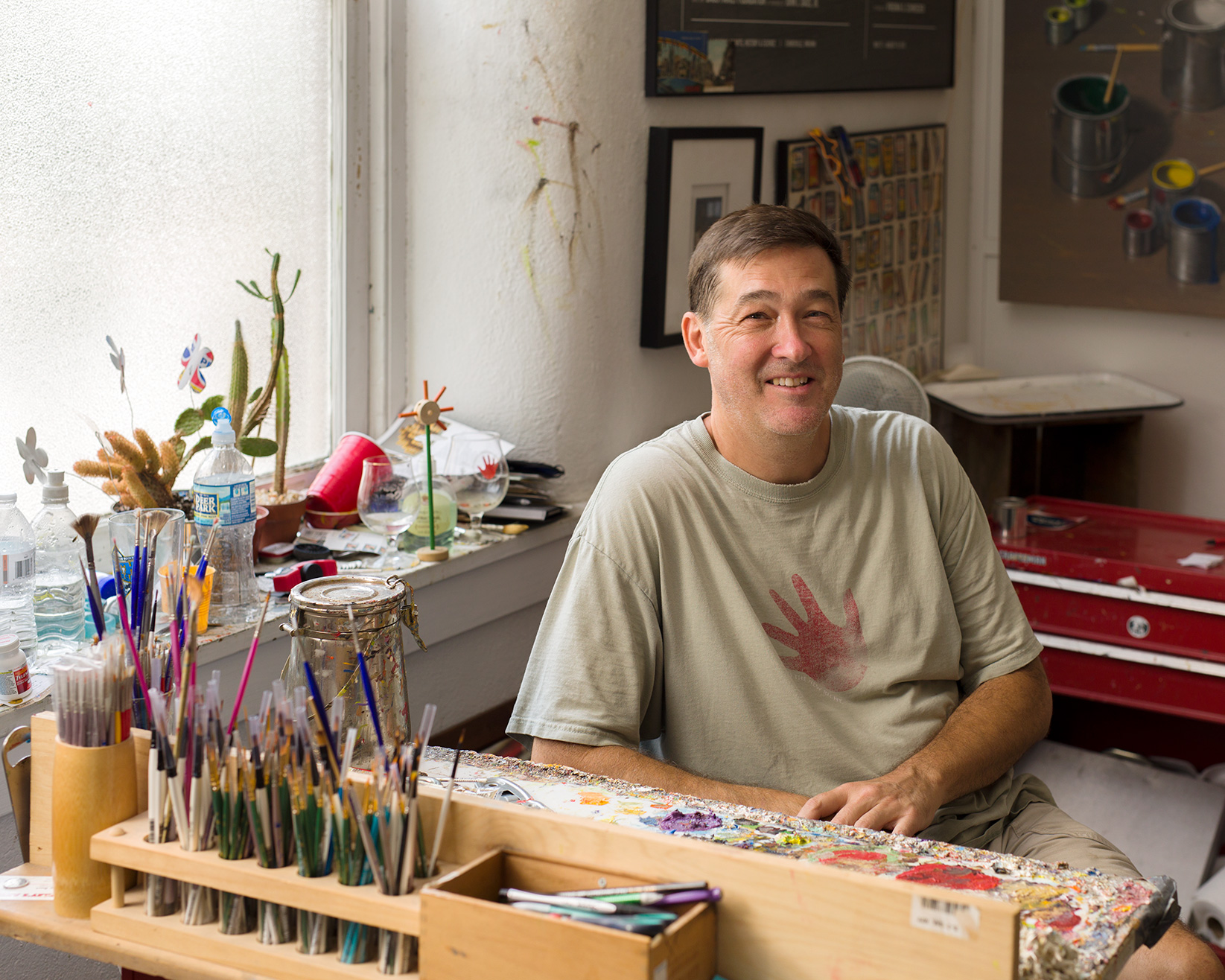
- Jackson in his studio (2017)
- Born: October 17, 1964 (age 61); Kinston, North Carolina
- Education: BS electrical engineering
- Alma mater: University of Delaware
- Known for: Anthropomorphic use of props such as balloon dogs, Oreos, apples, and vintage soda crates
- Website: robertcjackson.com

Robert Coleman Jackson (born October 17, 1964) is an American painter and author based in Kennett Square, Pennsylvania. He is known for his realistic still life paintings.

== Biography ==
Jackson graduated in 1986 from the University of Delaware with a BS degree in electrical engineering. As an elective during his senior year in college, Jackson took his first painting class. From 1986 to 1990 he worked at Motorola as a systems engineer and designed radio systems. He was an assistant pastor for Cedar Ridge Community Church in the Washington DC suburbs from 1990 to 1996. He has been working full-time as an artist since 1996. Jackson was the Evansville Museum of Arts, History and Science's 2012 artist-in-residence.

== Career ==
Jackson's paintings are considered representational and influenced by pop art. His usual medium is oil painting on stretched linen. He primarily works from life, setting up unique arrangements, when possible, in his studio before executing the paintings. His works contain themes of humor and nostalgia. A monograph about his work was published in 2012 by Philip Eliasoph: “The paintings ... are inescapably a bundle of contradictions, satirical complexities, and witty subterfuge. Essentially, Jackson is a uniquely self-realized painter. His feisty independence is fortified with healthy dosages of non-conforming eccentricity, with a small touch of screwball nuttiness.”

His work has been shown in over 30 solo exhibitions and 100 group exhibitions in the United States and is in numerous private, corporate, and museum collections.

Solo museum exhibits include the Evansville Museum of Arts, History and Science and the South Dakota Art Museum.

Group exhibitions include the Delaware Art Museum, Philbrook Museum of Art, Hunter Museum, Greenville County Museum of Art, John F. Peto Studio Museum, Islip Art Museum, Noyes Museum of Art, and the Brandywine River Museum.

Public collections include the Brandywine River Museum, New Britain Museum of American Art, Delaware Art Museum, Seven Bridges Foundation, South Dakota Art Museum, and the Evansville Museum of Arts, History and Science.

== Published works ==
Behind the Easel: The Unique Voices of 20 Contemporary Representational Painters (2014) The book became the basis for the Delaware Art Museum exhibition “Truth & Vision: 21st Century Realism” in 2016.
