= Samuel Jackson (cricketer) =

English cricketer

Samuel Robinson Jackson (15 July 1859 – 19 July 1941) was an English first-class cricketer, who played one game for Yorkshire County Cricket Club in 1891. A right-handed batsman, he scored 9 and a duck in the Roses Match at Old Trafford, which Lancashire won by an innings and 49 runs. He fared better in a non first-class match against Leicestershire at Headingley in the same year, scoring an unbeaten 54 out of Yorkshire's first innings of 156 and 15 in the second innings. Leicestershire won by one wicket. Reputed to be a right arm fast bowler, Jackson did not bowl in either of these games.

Born in Ecclesall, Sheffield, Yorkshire, England, Jackson died in July 1941 in Leeds, Yorkshire.
