= Buckingham Correctional Center =

Prison in Virginia, United States

- Interactive map of Buckingham Correctional Center
- Location: 1349 Correctional Center Road Dillwyn, Virginia; 37.555992°N 78.469723°W
- Status: operational
- Security class: close custody
- Capacity: 1100
- Population: 1094
- Opened: 1982
- Managed by: Virginia Department of Corrections
- Director: David Newcomer
- Website: https://vadoc.virginia.gov/facilities-and-offices/

Buckingham Correctional Center is a state prison (close-custody male institution) located on 968 acres (3.9 km^{2}) outside the town of Dillwyn in Buckingham County, Virginia. This facility is a security level 3-4 and has assignment criteria of single, multiple, and life. Transfer to any less-secure facility requires no disruptive behavior for at least 24 months prior to consideration.

== History ==
In August 2025, VDOC announced plans to expand the Virginia Model, an innovative approach to corrections, to three additional facilities: Buckingham, Dillwyn, and Cluster S1 at Greensville. The expansion is designed to provide incentive-based facilities across the Commonwealth that will serve both inmates and corrections professionals.

== Notable Inmates ==
- Micheal Hetle - A former police officer turned NASA executive who murdered his neighbor Javon Prather, a member of the National Guard, after accusing him of partying and drinking too loudly because it bothered him.
- Elton Manning Jackson - Suspected serial killer sentenced to life imprisonment for the murder of Andre Smith. Prime suspect in another 11 murders.
