= Samuel Macauley Jackson =

American editor and author (1851–1912)

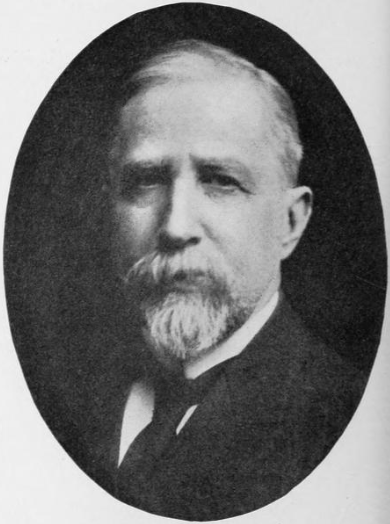
- Born: June 19, 1851; New York, New York, US
- Died: August 2, 1912 (aged 61); Washington, Connecticut, US
- Education: College of the City of New York; University of Leipzig; Washington and Lee University; New York University
- Occupations: Clergyman, editor, writer

Samuel Macauley Jackson (June 19, 1851 – August 2, 1912) was an American clergyman, editor and author.

== Biography ==
Samuel Macauley Jackson was born on June 19, 1851, in New York City, to George T. Jackson and Letitia J. A. Macauley.

After attending schools in New York, he entered the College of the City of New York in 1865, and graduated in 1870. (He was awarded an A. M. degree from the same institution in 1876.) He spent a year at the Princeton Theological Seminary, then he went to Union Seminary until 1873. He spent two years studying at the University of Leipzig and travelling in Europe and the Orient.

In 1876 he became a Presbyterian pastor in Norwood, New Jersey. He remained until 1880 and spent two years as assistant editor for the Bible Dictionary by Scaff. After resigning his post as pastor, he became an editor of the Schaff-Herzog Encyclopædia of Living Divines. Between 1885 and 1891 he served as author and editor of numerous other works of a theological nature. In 1892 he was awarded a LL. D. from Washington and Lee University, then a D. D. from New York University in 1893. He served as secretary of the American Society of Church History until 1896, and on charity and prison associations. In 1895 he became Professor of Church History at New York University.

He died in Washington, Connecticut on August 2, 1912.
