= Tommy Jackson (Australian footballer) =

Australian rules footballer

Personal information
- Full name: Thomas Joseph Jackson
- Born: 29 July 1885; Melbourne, Victoria
- Died: 24 December 1966 (aged 81); Elsternwick, Victoria
- Original team: Port Rovers

Playing career^{1}
| Years | Club | Games (Goals) |
| 1906–07 | St Kilda | 11 (0) |
- ^{1} Playing statistics correct to the end of 1907.

Thomas Joseph Jackson (29 July 1885 – 24 December 1966) was an Australian rules footballer who played with St Kilda in the Victorian Football League (VFL).

== Family ==
The eldest son of leather bag maker Thomas Charles Jackson and Martha Anne Cheetham (1861–1933), Thomas Joseph Jackson was born in Melbourne on 29 July 1885. He was the older brother of Jim Jackson who played for St Kilda, Collinwood and Hawthorn.
