= Daniel Jackson =

Daniel, Dan or Danny Jackson may refer to:

== Sports ==
- Danny Jackson (born 1962), American baseball player
- Danny Jackson (footballer) (born 1979), English central defender/sweeper
- Dan Jackson (American football coach), American football player and coach
- Daniel Jackson (footballer) (born 1986), Australian rules midfielder
- Daniel Jackson (basketball) (born 1988), Australian small forward
- Daniel Jackson (soccer) (born 1989), American forward
- Dan Jackson (defensive back) (born 2000), American football player
- Daniel Jackson (American football) (born 2002), American football player
- Daniel Jackson (baseball) (born 2004), American baseball player

== Others ==
- Daniel Jackson (computer scientist) (born 1963), English computer scientist at MIT
- Daniel Jackson (playwright) (born 1980), Scottish playwright
- Daniel Jackson (Stargate), character in the TV series Stargate played by James Spader (1994) and Michael Shanks (1997–2010)
- Daniel Jackson, character played by Barry Pepper in the 1998 film Saving Private Ryan
