= Elton Manning Jackson =

American convicted murderer

- 1996 photo of Elton Jackson
- Born: Elton Manning Jackson; 1956 (age 69–70); Virginia, U.S.
- Other name: Hampton Roads Killer
- Status: Incarcerated
- Conviction: First degree murder
- Penalty: Life imprisonment

Details
- Victims: 1
- Span of crimes: 1993–1996
- State: Virginia
- Date apprehended: May 6, 1997
- Imprisoned at: Buckingham Correctional Center

Elton Manning Jackson (born 1956) is an American convicted murderer is currently serving a sentence of life imprisonment.

== Victim ==
- On July 22, 1996, 38-year-old Andrew D. "Andre" Smith was found near the Deep Creek section, and he was the only confirmed victim of Elton Jackson. According to sources, Andre Smith was last seen going to the house of Jackson on July 21, 1996, between 2:30am and 3:00am, and he told two acquaintances that he was going to get some money and would be meeting one of them in 15 minutes. However, Smith did not show up. According to Jackson's statement, he had consensual sex with Smith after the latter came to the house, but he denied killing the victim. Autopsy reports showed that the cause of death was ligature strangulation, and it was the prosecution's contention that Jackson strangled and murdered Smith after having sex with him, before he disposed of the body at the site where they discovered Smith's corpse.

== Surviving victims ==
Jackson was also linked to three more incidents where he had sex with the men before he tried to strangle them. These three men survived and later became witnesses for the police and prosecution.

- During the summer of 1995, presumably around Memorial Day, at a lunch counter where Jackson worked, he first met 36-year-old Willie C. Simpson, and they started a relationship, which lasted for three months and included sex in exchange for money. By July 1995, the couple became roommates. On one night in October 1995, Jackson and Simpson had sex inside the former's truck while it was parked along a road, and during the encounter, Jackson took out a strap and tried to loop it around Simpson's neck, and Simpson reacted by subduing him in a headlock and hit his head against the window, before he escaped into the forest on foot. Simpson went back to pick up his clothes the following day, and that was the last time he saw Jackson. In his statement, Jackson denied the strangulation attempt and claimed that they broke up after the sexual encounter because he caught Simpson stealing from him, and also accused Simpson of fabricating the account.
- Sometime in May 1995, 19-year-old Tommy Anderson Jr. first met Jackson and agreed to be paid for having sex with Jackson. Anderson first went to Jackson's house to have sex with the latter, but in the middle, Jackson turned rough and pushed his forearm against Anderson's neck, and he stopped after Anderson threatened to scream. Subsequently, Jackson gave a ride to Anderson, and when they reached the same area where Andre Smith's body would be disposed of a year later, Jackson struck Anderson and threatened to kill him, and instructed Anderson to step out with his hands on the vehicle. When Jackson approached Anderson from behind with a strap, Anderson kicked him and threw a rock at him, and fled the area. Jackson denied having any sexual relations with Anderson when the police questioned him regarding the Anderson case.
- On the early morning of December 11, 1996, 29-year-old Kevin Michael Benton was picked up by Jackson in the Norfolk area, and they later went to Jackson's house to have sex. Initially, Benton agreed to have his hands tied while Jackson would massage him and pay him $75 for the offer. However, Benton noticed Jackson approaching from behind and tried to put a strap over his head, and he therefore kicked at Jackson and fought back, and untied his hands. Later that morning, Benton was paid $19 and some change by Jackson, who later brought Benton to meet his probation officer. During interrogation, Jackson admitted to the police that he indeed had sex with Benton but denied engaging in any violent acts during the encounter.

== Jackson's arrest and charges ==
On May 6, 1997, ten months after the murder of Andre Smith, Elton Jackson was arrested as a suspect for the crime.

On the same day of Jackson's arrest, a grand jury formally indicted Jackson for the first-degree murder of Andre Smith. Jackson reportedly denied killing Smith.

In August 1997, Jackson's lawyers requested to Circuit Judge V. Thomas Forehand to move the trial venue out of Chesapeake, on the grounds that Jackson cannot receive a fair trial in the county due to pretrial publicity surrounding the case. On September 19, 1997, the trial venue was moved from Chesapeake to Portsmouth.

In March 1998, the surviving victims and ex-partners of Jackson – Kevin Benton, Tommy Anderson and Willie Simpson – came forward to recount their previous encounters with Jackson. The prosecution sought to admit their testimonies against Jackson, but the defence asked the court to bar the surviving men from testifying. That same month, the judge allowed the prosecution to summon the three men as witnesses against Jackson.

In late March 1998, the trial of Jackson was ordered to be relocated once again due to pretrial publicity. On April 2, 1998, Jackson's trial was moved to Newport News. The trial, which was originally set to begin on April 21, 1998, was re-scheduled for August 17, 1998.

== Trial ==
On August 17, 1998, the murder trial of Elton Jackson began at the Newport News Circuit Court, and jury selection was conducted on the same day.

During the trial itself, the prosecution summoned multiple witnesses to prove that Jackson was responsible for the murder of Andre Smith. Two of Smith's acquaintances who last seen the victim alive before his death were among the 18 witnesses summoned on the second day of trial. Jackson's three surviving victims and ex-partners also came to court to testify about their respective ordeals with Jackson.

Jackson, who took the stand on the fourth day, told the court that he indeed had sex with Smith but denied murdering him. After the testimony of Jackson and several character witnesses, the defence rested its case and the jury began to deliberate the case. Under Virginia state law, if the jury found Jackson guilty of first-degree murder, he faced a potential sentence of 20 years to life.

On August 22, 1998, after five hours of deliberation, the jury found Jackson guilty of the first-degree murder of Andre Smith, and they recommended the maximum sentence of life imprisonment for the defendant.

On October 27, 1998, Jackson was sentenced to life in prison by Circuit Judge James A. Cales Jr. for the murder. During sentencing, Judge Cale remarked that the crime was violent in nature and Jackson exhibited a lack of remorse or humanity in killing the victim, and therefore imposed the maximum sentence. He additionally refused the defence's recommended sentence of 20 years to 34 years and 11 months.

== Appeal and imprisonment ==
On September 5, 2000, the Virginia Court of Appeals rejected Elton Jackson's appeal against his murder conviction and life sentence.

Jackson's first parole review hearing was held by the Virginia Parole Board in April 2020, and it was rejected. Jackson's second bid for parole was also dismissed in May 2022.

In October 2023, Jackson was denied parole for the third time. Jackson's fourth parole hearing was conducted in August 2024, and the board similarly refused to grant parole.

In June 2025, Jackson was denied parole for the fifth time.

As of 2026, Jackson remains incarcerated at the Buckingham Correctional Center.
