= Tom Jackson (Australian footballer) =

Australian rules footballer

Personal information
- Full name: Thomas Jackson
- Born: 3 July 1881
- Died: 5 January 1929 (aged 47)
- Original team: Brunswick Juniors
- Height: 178 cm (5 ft 10 in)
- Weight: 82 kg (181 lb)

Playing career^{1}
Years	Club	Games (Goals)
1903	Melbourne	1 (0)
- ^{1} Playing statistics correct to the end of 1903.

Tom Jackson (3 July 1881 – 5 January 1929) was an Australian rules footballer who played with Melbourne in the Victorian Football League (VFL).
