= Jordan Jackson =

Jordan Jackson may refer to:

- Jordan Jackson (soccer) (born 1990), American soccer player
- Jordan Jackson (American football) (born 1998), American football player
- Jordan Jackson-Hope (born 1996), Australian rugby union player
