= Justice Jackson =

Justice Jackson may refer to:

- Three justices of the U.S. Supreme Court:
  - Ketanji Brown Jackson (born 1970), associate justice
  - Robert H. Jackson (1892–1954), associate justice
  - Howell E. Jackson (1832–1895), associate justice
- Amos W. Jackson (1904–1972), associate justice of the Indiana Supreme Court
- Andrew Jackson (1767–1845), associate justice of the Tennessee Supreme Court
- Barbara Jackson (born 1961), associate justice of the North Carolina Supreme Court
- James Jackson (congressman) (1819–1887), chief justice of the Supreme Court of Georgia
- Joseph Raymond Jackson (1880–1969), commissioner for the Montana Supreme Court
- Mortimer M. Jackson (1809–1889), associate justice of the Wisconsin Supreme Court
- Rupert Jackson (born 1948), Lord Justice of Appeal of the Court of Appeal of England and Wales
- Schuyler W. Jackson (1904–1964), associate justice of the Kansas Supreme Court

== See also ==
- Judge Jackson (disambiguation)
