= Tim Jackson =

Tim Jackson may refer to:

- Tim Jackson (economist) (born 1957), British ecological economist and professor of sustainable development at the University of Surrey
- Tim Jackson (businessman) (born 1965), British businessman, founder of QXL.com
- Tim Jackson (sprinter) (born 1969), Australian sprinter
- Tim Jackson (politician) (1907–1975), Australian politician and Tasmanian Leader of the Opposition from 1956 to 1960
- Tim Jackson (American football) (born 1965), American football safety
- Timothy J. Sullivan (born 1944), American president of the College of William and Mary from 1992 to 2005
- Timothy L. Jackson (born 1958), American music theory professor
- Timothy Jackson, fictional character and artist in the 2012–2014 novel series Zom-B by Darren Shan
