= Steve Jackson (footballer) =

English footballer (1890–1917)

Personal information
- Full name: Stephen Jackson
- Date of birth: 1890
- Place of birth: Smethwick, England
- Date of death: 26 October 1917 (aged 27)
- Place of death: southwest of Gheluvelt, Belgium
- Position: Full back

Senior career*
Years	Team	Apps	(Gls)
1911–1914	Coventry City	12	(0)
- * Club domestic league appearances and goals

Stephen Simeon Jackson DCM MM (29 March 1890 – 26 October 1917) was an English professional footballer who played as a full back in the Southern Football League for Coventry City.

== Personal life ==
Stephen Simeon Jackson was born on 29 March 1890 in Birmingham to William and Charlotte (nee Butler). He was married.on 25 December 1909 in Winson Green, Warwickshire to Edith Wright. They had four children William (born 1910), Stephen (born 1911), Annie (born 1913) and Violet (born 1914).

He enlisted as a sergeant in the South Staffordshire Regiment. Jackson served at Gallipoli and was wounded, being transferred to France upon his recovery. In April 1917, he was awarded the Military Medal for conduct displayed during fighting at Bullecourt. Jackson was later appointed as an acting company sergeant major and was awarded the Distinguished Conduct Medal for conduct during a trench raid at Bullecourt.

For conspicuous gallantry and devotion to duty during a raid. Although not taking part in it, he went out under very heavy fire at a critical moment, having learnt that the raid was making very little progress owing to considerable opposition. He reorganised parties and led them forward, afterwards personally conducting stretcher bearers up to the enemy lines and clearing No Man's Land of wounded. His fearlessness and splendid initiative at a trying time proved invaluable to the success of the operation.

— The Edinburgh Gazette, 19 September 1917

Jackson was killed in action on 26 October 1917 during his battalion's attack on a fortification southwest of Gheluvelt, Belgium. He is buried at Perth (China Wall) Cemetery.

== Career statistics ==
Appearances and goals by club, season and competition
Club	Season	Division	League		FA Cup		Total	
Club	Season	Division	Apps	Goals	Apps	Goals	Apps	Goals
Coventry City	1911–12	Southern League First Division	1	0	0	0	1	0
Coventry City	1912–13	Southern League First Division	6	0	0	0	6	0
Coventry City	1913–14	Southern League First Division	6	0	0	0	6	0
Career total			12	0	0	0	12	0
