= Thunder Jackson =

- Thunder Jackson (left), Castro Theatre, May 1, 2026

Background information
- Born: Kyle Bradley; Los Angeles, California, U.S.
- Genres: Pop, indie pop
- Occupations: Singer, musician
- Instruments: Vocals, piano, guitar
- Label: Vero Music
- Website: www.thunderjackson.com

Kyle Bradley, known professionally as Thunder Jackson, is an American pop singer and musician.

== Early life and career ==
Born Kyle Bradley in Los Angeles, California, Thunder Jackson was raised in Piedmont, Oklahoma. As a teenager he spent years busking and performing in bars as well as on the Third Street Promenade in Santa Monica, California. The son of an Elvis impersonator that encouraged him to pursue a career as a singer, also got Jackson a license to perform in bars when he was still under the legal drinking age.

Jackson moved back to Los Angeles to pursue his musical career at age 19. Musician Pete Lawrie Winfield from the band Until the Ribbon Breaks was riding in an Uber when he overheard Jackson singing in the backseat. The two went on to produce Jackson's self-titled debut album that was released on October 1, 2020, with all songs written by Jackson and Winfield. The stage name Thunder Jackson was conceived when Jackson and Winfield were camping and heard lighting which gave Jackson the idea for the name Thunder. Winfield later came up with adding the last name Jackson.

Jackson's father makes an appearance on his song “Love Sick Doctor” in what GQ magazine called “A Dennis Hopper-style monologue”. In 2017, Jackson had a viral hit with the song “Guilty Party”. In 2020 he followed up and released the song "Find Yourself", called "a triumphant return" by The Line of Best Fit. In 2021, Jackson released a cover version of the A-ha song “Take On Me”. In 2024, Jackson performed at the South by Southwest festival.

Jackson's second album is entitled Hello Stranger was released on October 25, 2026. The Hello Stranger single “Steady Freddy” was a hit in Germany.

== Discography ==
- Thunder Jackson (2020)
- Hello Stranger (2026)
