= Barney Jackson =

American politician

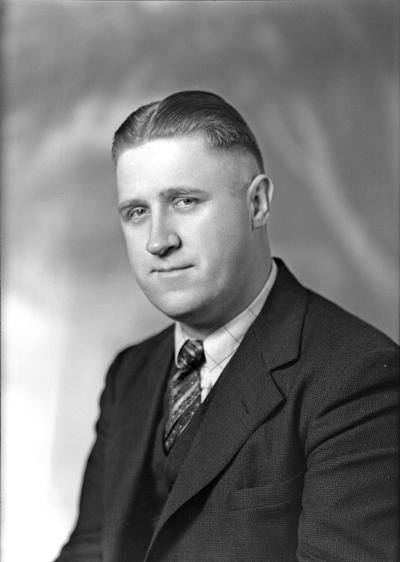
- Jackson in 1937

Member of the Washington House of Representatives for the 29th district
- In office 1937–1941

Member of the Washington State Senate for the 29th district
- In office 1941–1951; 1955–1959

Personal details
- Born: March 18, 1904 Saint Paul, Minnesota, United States
- Died: March 1971 (aged 66–67) Tacoma, Washington, United States
- Party: Democratic

Harold N. "Barney" Jackson (March 18, 1904 – March 17, 1971) was an American politician in the state of Washington. He served in the Washington House of Representatives and Washington State Senate.
