= Theo Jackson =

Theo Jackson may refer to:

- Theo Jackson (musician) (born 1986), British jazz songwriter, pianist and vocalist
- Theo Jackson (American football) (born 1998), American football player
