= The Lost Squire of Inglewood =

1905 novel

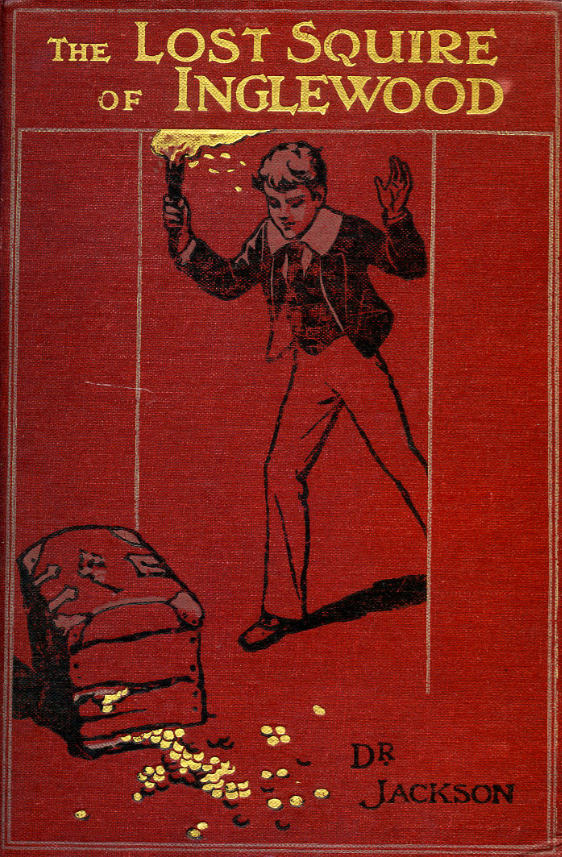
- Author: Thomas Jackson
- Language: English
- Subject: adventure story
- Genre: Adventure
- Publisher: Thomas Nelson and Sons, Ltd.
- Publication date: 1905
- Pages: 220

The Lost Squire of Inglewood is an adventure story book of Thomas Jackson published in 1905 by Thomas Nelson and Sons, Ltd. A review in The Sydney Mail explained that the book is about the adventures of two boys who run away from school and discover hidden tunnels in the forest from the days of Robin Hood.
