= Matthew Jackson =

Matthew Jackson may refer to:

- Matthew Jackson (American football) (born 1998), American football player
- Matthew Jackson (baseball), American baseball player
- Matthew Jackson (EastEnders), a character on the soap opera EastEnders
- Matthew Jackson (footballer) (born 1974), former Australian rules footballer
- Matthew Day Jackson (born 1974), American artist
- Matthew O. Jackson (born 1962), professor of economics
- Matt Jackson (footballer) (born 1971), English former footballer
- Matt Jackson (wrestler) (born 1985), professional wrestler, member of The Young Bucks
- Mat Jackson (born 1982), British racing driver
