= Anthony Jackson (paediatrician) =

British paediatrician

Anthony Jackson FRCP, FRCPCH
- Tony Jackson
- Born: Anthony Derek Maurice Jackson; 9 July 1918
- Died: 24 December 2005 (aged 87)
- Other name: Tony
- Education: Middlesex Hospital Medical School
- Occupation: Paediatrician

Anthony Derek Maurice Jackson (9 July 1918 – 24 December 2005) was a British paediatrician, recognised for his pioneering work in the management of cystic fibrosis.

== Life ==
Jackson was born in Dublin in 1918 to Robert Jackson, a jeweller, and Monica Roberts. He obtained his qualification in medicine from Middlesex Hospital Medical School in 1943, then served in the Royal Army Medical Corps in Holland, Germany, and north Africa. At the end of the war, he spent a year working in general practice before undertaking training in paediatrics at Middlesex Hospital and Great Ormond Street Hospital. He trained under Wilfrid Percy Henry Sheldon and Alan Moncrieff. He later worked as a consultant paediatrician at the London Hospital, having been appointed in 1959 as one of only two paediatricians on staff, and in a specialist cystic fibrosis clinic at the Queen Elizabeth Hospital for Children. The clinic had been started by Winifred Young in 1950 and at the time was one of only a few cystic fibrosis clinics in the country.

Jackson was postgraduate dean at the London Hospital Medical College from 1970 to 1982. He served on the council of the Royal College of Physicians and, for ten years from 1984, as chair of the Cystic Fibrosis Trust's Research and Medical Advisory Committee. He became president of the Royal Society of Medicine's paediatrics section in 1981 and president of the Association for Paediatric Education in Europe in 1986. He was awarded honorary fellowship of the Royal College of Paediatrics and Child Health upon its founding in 1996.

He died on 24 December 2005 from pneumonia and peritonitis, after developing chronic renal failure several years earlier. Following his death, the Royal College of Paediatrics and Child Health established a prize in his name.
