= John Jackson (Worcestershire cricketer) =

English cricketer

Cricket information
- Batting: Right-handed

Career statistics
Competition	First-class
Matches	1
Runs scored	6
Batting average	3.00
100s/50s	0/0
Top score	6
Catches/stumpings	0/–
- Source: CricketArchive, 8 November 2022

John Frederick Cecil Jackson (8 May 1880 – 22 November 1968) was an English first-class cricketer who played a single match, for Worcestershire against Oxford University. He scored 0 and 6.

Jackson was born in Meopham, Kent; he died aged 88 in Kidderminster, Worcestershire.
