= Muriel Amy Jackson =

British artist

Muriel Amy Jackson (1902–1989) was a British painter and illustrator.

== Biography ==
Jackson was born in London and was the daughter of Eva Amy and the artist Albert Edward Jackson, 1873–1952. She attended Berkhamsted High School before studying at the Hastings School of Art. After further study in London at the Central School of Arts and Crafts between 1915 and 1918, Jackson studied under Philip William Cole until 1922.

Jackson worked as an illustrator for the Amelgamated Press and other publishers. She created illustrations for magazines and children's books with flowers and architectural topics being among her regular subjects. Jackson was an elected member of the East Sussex Art Club and exhibited works with the Battle Arts Group and the Highgate Artists' Society in London. She lived in Hastings in Sussex and died in 1989, after a period of suffering from Parkinson's disease.
