= Steve Jackson (thriller writer) =

Scottish writer

- Born: 1969 (age 55–56); Arbroath, Scotland
- Occupation: Author, recording engineer
- Genres: Action and suspense

Website
- www.steve-jackson.net

Steve Jackson (born 1969 Arbroath, Scotland) is a Scottish thriller writer.

Jackson spent his early childhood living in the town of Carnoustie. At the age of eleven he moved to Stroud in Gloucestershire, England. He now lives in St. Albans, Hertfordshire.

On leaving school, Jackson went into journalism. He worked first for the Marlborough Times, and then for the Stroud News & Journal. The Nineties saw a radical change of direction. A keen guitarist from a young age, he spent most of that decade trying to make a living as a musician. During this time he played in numerous bands. He also worked as a recording engineer.

At the turn of the millennium he started writing fiction. His debut novel, The Mentor, was published by HarperCollins in October 2006. The book introduces MI6 spy, Paul Aston. The Mentor opens with the bombing of a London Underground train. The second Paul Aston book, The Judas, was published in 2007.

Steve Jackson is also known on Facebook for making the group, Six Degrees of Separation - The Experiment. The group is an experiment in the effort to prove that six degrees of separation is in fact true. He plans on using the data from the group in The Watcher.
