= Anthony Jackson (soldier) =

17th century English lawyer, soldier, and knight

Sir Anthony Jackson
- Born: 1599; Killingwold Grove, Bishop Burton, Yorkshire, England
- Died: 1666 (aged 66–67); England
- Resting place: London, England
- Occupations: Lawyer, soldier
- Parent(s): Richard Jackson; Ursula Hildyard

Sir Anthony Jackson (1599–1666) was an English lawyer, soldier, and knight in the seventeenth century. A cavalier during the English Civil War, he was knighted by Charles II, participated in the Battle of Worcester, and was imprisoned in the Tower of London for over a decade.

== Biography ==
Jackson was born in 1599 in Killingwold Grove, Bishop Burton, Yorkshire, England, the son of Richard Jackson and Ursula Hildyard. Richard was the son of Anthony Jackson and Margaret Frobisher, the sister of Martin Frobisher. He was baptized at All Saints on 5 September 1599. He was ten years, eleven months old when his father died. Jackson was admitted to the Inner Temple on 30 October 1616 to study law. In the late 1620s, he worked as private secretary to George Villiers, 1st Duke of Buckingham. He was called to the Bar in 1635. He would become Bencher 25 years later, after the war, in 1660. He was also a gentleman in the Privy Chamber to King Charles I.

When the English Civil War broke out in the mid-seventeenth century, Jackson was a supporter of the Stuarts. He was knighted at Breda about 1650 when Charles II was in the Netherlands and Oliver Cromwell headed the English government. He acted as Herald in proclaiming Charles II King of England. In September 1651 during the Battle of Worcester, Anthony was taken prisoner. He escaped with other prisoners, but was retaken and committed to the Tower of London under an order of the Council of State, dated 1 November 1651 "for invading this nation with Charles Stuart." On 11 November, his wife was granted permission to visit him. Anthony petitioned to Oliver Cromwell to be released, stating that he was "a servant only to the late king, but never in arms, and had only charity to subsist on." The indorsement of the petition reads "Herald that proclaimed Charles Stuart." This petition was taken to Council on 22 February 1653–4 but he was not released from the Tower. On 5 February 1655–6, Jackson once again petitioned Cromwell for release on security for good conduct, alleging that otherwise he must perish for want, as his friends could no longer supply him. The certificate of the Lieutenant of the Tower accompanying the petition states that "he has demeaned himself civilly, is retired and studious and very poor and fit to be released." The petition also states that his land was confiscated because of his loyalty to the Stuarts.

In 1658, Charles II was reinstated to the monarchy and in 1659, Anthony was released and given 50 pounds. Anthony died in 1666. and was buried at the Temple Church on 14 October 1666. His burial registry reads as such "Sir Anthony Jackson, of the Inner Temple, kt, was buried in the round near the iron gratt the 14th day of October, 1666."
