= William T. Jackson (Ohio politician) =

American politician

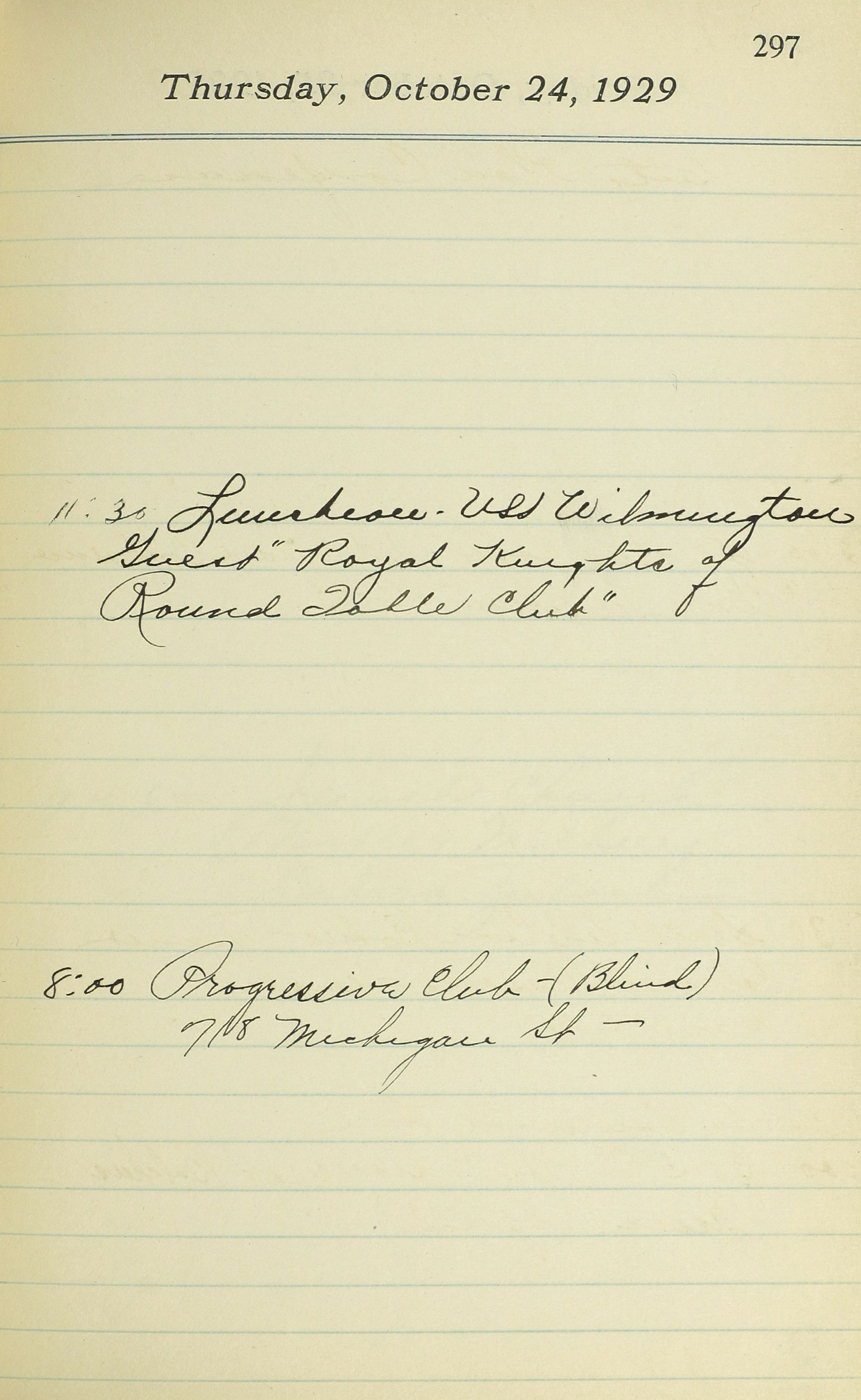
The page from Mayor Jackson's appointment book on "Black Thursday" of Wall Street Crash of 1929 at the start of the Great Depression.

William Trayton Jackson (May 8, 1876 – October 3, 1933) was an American politician. He served as mayor of Toledo, Ohio between 1928 and 1931.

== Sources ==
- The Political Graveyard
