= Eddie Jackson (singer) =

American musician (1926–2002)

Eddie Jackson (1926 – January 14, 2002) was an American country and rockabilly musician.

Jackson was born in Cookeville, Tennessee, and moved as a youngster with his family to Detroit, Michigan. He began playing country and Western swing in local bars as a teenager, and served in the Navy during World War II. He fronted a band called The Cowboy Swingsters, then simply The Swingsters for nearly 50 years, playing rhythm guitar and singing. Other musicians in his bands, such as Jimmy Franklin during the 1950s, sometimes sang.

He released two singles of interest to early rock & roll historians, 1956's, "Rock and Roll baby" b/w "You Are the One" (for Fortune Records) and 1957's "Baby Doll" b/w "Please Don't Cry" (for Shelby Records). A third record, "Blues I Can't Hide" b/w Bobby Sykes' "I'm Learning", appeared on Caravan Records in 1963, followed by three more country singles. Jackson's last single of the 1960s, "You Put It There" b/w "Worldwide Distributor Of Loneliness," was cut in Nashville.

In the 1970s, Jackson began playing with guitarist Marv Weyer, and the pair continued to collaborate until Jackson died of respiratory failure in 2002 at age 75.
