= 2017 Florida State Seminoles baseball team =

American college baseball season

2017 Florida State Seminoles baseball

ACC Tournament champion

NCAA tournament, Tallahassee Regional NCAA tournament, Tallahassee Super Regional College World Series
- Conference: Atlantic Coast Conference
- Atlantic Division

Ranking
- Coaches: No. 6
- CB: No. 6
- Record: 46–23 (14–14 ACC)
- Head coach: Mike Martin (38th season)
- Assistant coach: Mike Martin, Jr. (20th season)
- Pitching coach: Mike Bell (6th season)
- Home stadium: Mike Martin Field at Dick Howser Stadium (Capacity: 6,700)

2017 Atlantic Coast Conference baseball standings
	Conf.				Overall
Team	W		L	PCT	W		L	PCT
Atlantic
No. 5 Louisville ^{x}‍‍‍^{y}	23	–	6	.793	53	–	12	.815
No. 12 Wake Forest ‍‍‍^{y}	19	–	11	.633	43	–	20	.683
No. 25 Clemson ‍‍‍^{y}	17	–	13	.567	42	–	21	.667
No. 30 NC State ‍‍‍^{y}	16	–	14	.533	36	–	25	.590
No. 6 Florida State ‍‍‡‍^{y}	14	–	14	.500	46	–	23	.667
Boston College ‍‍‍	11	–	19	.367	25	–	28	.472
Notre Dame ‍‍‍	10	–	20	.333	26	–	32	.448
Coastal
No. 17 North Carolina ^{x}‍‍‍^{y}	23	–	7	.767	49	–	14	.778
No. 21 Virginia ‍‍‍^{y}	18	–	12	.600	43	–	16	.729
Miami (FL) ‍‍‍	16	–	13	.552	31	–	27	.534
Duke ‍‍‍	12	–	18	.400	30	–	28	.517
Georgia Tech ‍‍‍	11	–	19	.367	27	–	28	.491
Pittsburgh ‍‍‍	9	–	21	.300	23	–	30	.434
Virginia Tech ‍‍‍	9	–	21	.300	23	–	32	.418
x – Division champion ‡ – Tournament champion y – Invited to the NCAA tournament Rankings from Collegiate Baseball

The 2017 Florida State Seminoles baseball team represented Florida State University during the 2017 NCAA Division I baseball season. The Seminoles play their home games at Mike Martin Field at Dick Howser Stadium as a member of the Atlantic Coast Conference. They are led by head coach Mike Martin, in his 38th season at Florida State.

Florida State finished the 2016 season with a 41–22 record, winning 16 conference games, and finishing as the runner-up in the ACC tournament. The Seminoles qualified for the NCAA tournament for the thirty-ninth consecutive year, where they won the Tallahassee Regional but were eliminated by Florida in the Gainesville Super Regional. Prior to the start of the season, Florida State was picked to finish first in the Atlantic Division as well as the ACC, while shortstop Taylor Walls, catcher Cal Raleigh, infielder Dylan Busby and outfielder Jackson Lueck were named preseason All-American players.

Despite failing to finish with a winning record in ACC play for the first time, the Seminoles went on to win the ACC tournament to secure a spot in the NCAA tournament as the twelfth overall seed. Eventually advancing to the Super Regionals, Florida State went on to become just the 21st team to ever lose their first game and come back to win four straight to take the regional, going on to make their first appearance at the College World Series in five years. Nine players from the team were selected in the MLB draft, the most for the school since 1995.

== Personnel ==
=== Roster ===
2017 Florida State Seminoles roster
Pitchers	Catchers Infielders	Outfielders

=== Coaching staff ===
2017 Florida State Seminoles baseball coaching staff
- 11 - Mike Martin – Head coach – 38th season
- 22 - Mike Bell – Associate head coach / Pitchers - 6th season
- 4 - Mike Martin, Jr. – Assistant coach/recruiting coordinator - 20th season

== Schedule ==
2017 Florida State Seminoles baseball game log
Regular season
February

Date	Opponent	Rank	Site/stadium	Score	Win	Loss	Save	Attendance	Overall Record	ACC Record
Feb 17	VCU*	#9	Dick Howser Stadium • Tallahassee, FL	**L** 0–3	Parrish (1–0)	**Carlton (0–1)**	Donko (1)	5,071	0–1	
Feb 18	VCU*	#9	Dick Howser Stadium • Tallahassee, FL	**W** 12–3	**Sands (1–0)**	Dailey (0–1)	None	4,520	1–1	
Feb 19	VCU*	#9	Dick Howser Stadium • Tallahassee, FL	**W** 11–3 (Note: This win marked Mike Martin's 1,900th win as head coach.)	**Holton (1–0)**	Vial (0–1)	None	5,390	2–1	
Feb 21	South Florida*	#9	Dick Howser Stadium • Tallahassee, FL	**L** 2–4	Savarese (1–0)	**Byrd (0–1)**	Perez (1)	4,144	2–2	
Feb 24	Samford*	#9	Dick Howser Stadium • Tallahassee, FL	**W** 16–3	**Sands (2–0)**	McCord (0–1)	None	4,286	3–2	
Feb 25	Samford*	#9	Dick Howser Stadium • Tallahassee, FL	**W** 8–0	**Holton (2–0)**	Cazanave (1–1)	None	4,605	4–2	
Feb 26	Samford*	#9	Dick Howser Stadium • Tallahassee, FL	**W** 13–4	**Parrish (1–0)**	Jones (0–1)	None	4,392	5–2	
Feb 28	at Jacksonville*	#10	John Sessions Stadium • Jacksonville, FL	**W** 6–5	**Haney (1–0)**	Cassala (0–1)	**Carlton (1)**	1,027	6–2	

March

Date	Opponent	Rank	Site/stadium	Score	Win	Loss	Save	Attendance	Overall Record	ACC Record
Mar 3	Oakland*	#10	Dick Howser Stadium • Tallahassee, FL	**W** 18–10	**Voyles (1–0)**	Fannon (0–1)	None	4,035	7–2	
Mar 4	Oakland*	#10	Dick Howser Stadium • Tallahassee, FL	**W** 12–1	**Holton (3–0)**	Palm (0–2)	None	4,344	8–2	
Mar 5	Oakland*	#10	Dick Howser Stadium • Tallahassee, FL	**W** 14–6	**Voyles (1–0)**	Parr (1–2)	None	4,429	9–2	
Mar 7	at UCF*	#8	Jay Bergman Field • Orlando, FL	**W** 5–2	**Byrd (1–1)**	Williams (0–2)	**Carlton (2)**	3,205	10–2	
Mar 8	at UCF*	#8	Jay Bergman Field • Orlando, FL	**W** 5–0	**Zirzow (1–0)**	Sheridan (2–1)	None	2,226	11–2	
Mar 10	Boston College	#8	Dick Howser Stadium • Tallahassee, FL	**L** 5–8	Stevens (2–0)	**Sands (2–1)**	Casey (1)	4,143	11–3	0–1
Mar 11	Boston College	#8	Dick Howser Stadium • Tallahassee, FL	**W** 11–1	**Holton (4–0)**	Gill (1–3)	None	4,452	12–3	1–1
Mar 11	Boston College	#8	Dick Howser Stadium • Tallahassee, FL	**W** 13–0	**Parrish (2–0)**	Metzdorf (1–2)	None	4,452	13–3	2–1
Mar 14	at #8 Florida*	#6	McKethan Stadium • Gainesville, FL	**L** 0–1	Baker (1–1)	**Karp (0–1)**	Dyson (1)	5,806	13–4	
Mar 15	at #22 Florida Gulf Coast*	#6	JetBlue Park • Fort Myers, FL	**L** 2–5	Hering (3–1)	**Voyles (1–1)**	Koerner (5)	3,489	13–5	
Mar 17	at Virginia Tech	#6	English Field • Blacksburg, VA	**W** 9–2	**Sands (3–1)**	Naughton (1–3)	None	153	14–5	3–1
Mar 18	at Virginia Tech	#6	English Field • Blacksburg, VA	**L** 12–13	Coward (4–0)	**Zirzow (1–1)**	McGarity (4)	645	14–6	3–2
Mar 19	at Virginia Tech	#6	English Field • Blacksburg, VA	**L** 0–17	Anderson (4–1)	**Parrish (2–1)**	None	441	14–7	3–3
Mar 21	Jacksonville*	#18	Dick Howser Stadium • Tallahassee, FL	**W** 10–9	**Carlton (1–1)**	Cassala (0–2)	None	4,462	15–7	
Mar 24	at Notre Dame	#18	Frank Eck Stadium • South Bend, IN	**W** 8–2	**Sands (4–1)**	Bielak (1–4)	None	701	16–7	4–3
Mar 24	at Notre Dame	#18	Frank Eck Stadium • South Bend, IN	**W** 8–3^{11}	**Voyles (2–0)**	Solomon (1–2)	None	701	17–7	5–3
Mar 25	at Notre Dame	#18	Frank Eck Stadium • South Bend, IN	**W** 5–1	**Parrish (3–1)**	Bass (1–3)	None	420	18–7	6–3
Mar 28	vs. #11 Florida*	#12	Baseball Grounds of Jacksonville • Jacksonville, FL	**L** 1–4	Milchin (1–1)	**Karp (0–2)**	Byrne (2)	8,924	18–8	
Mar 31	#7 North Carolina	#12	Dick Howser Stadium • Tallahassee, FL	**L** 1–3	Bukauskas (5–0)	**Sands (4–2)**	Hiatt (10)	4,730	18–9	6–4

April

Date	Opponent	Rank	Site/stadium	Score	Win	Loss	Save	Attendance	Overall Record	ACC Record
Apr 1	#7 North Carolina	#12	Dick Howser Stadium • Tallahassee, FL	**L** 2–5^{11}	Hiatt (1–1)	**Carlton (1–2)**	None	5,603	18–10	6–5
Apr 2	#7 North Carolina	#12	Dick Howser Stadium • Tallahassee, FL	**L** 7–9	Baum (4–0)	**Haney (1–1)**	None	4,480	18–11	6–6
Apr 4	#9 Florida Gulf Coast*		Dick Howser Stadium • Tallahassee, FL	**W** 7–6	**Carlton (2–2)**	Hering (4–2)	None	4,038	19–11	
Apr 5	#9 Florida Gulf Coast*		Dick Howser Stadium • Tallahassee, FL	**W** 3–2^{5}	**Stewart (1–0)**	Gray (3–1)	None	3,624	20–11	
Apr 7	at NC State		Doak Field • Raleigh, NC	**W** 16–7	**Sands (5–2)**	Adler (3–4)	None	2,853	21–11	7–6
Apr 8	at NC State		Doak Field • Raleigh, NC	**L** 3–4	Brown (1–0)	**Holton (4–1)**	Beckman (1)	2,975	21–12	7–7
Apr 9	at NC State		Doak Field • Raleigh, NC	**L** 4–8	Bienlien (2–1)	**Parrish (3–2)**	Feeney (1)	2,858	21–13	7–8
Apr 11	#18 Florida*		Dick Howser Stadium • Tallahassee, FL	**L** 7–10	Horvath (1–0)	**Haney (1–2)**	None	5,944	21–14	
Apr 15	#4 Clemson		Dick Howser Stadium • Tallahassee, FL	**L** 10–12	Gilliam (2–0)	**Carlton (2–3)**	None	5,753	21–15	7–9
Apr 16	#4 Clemson		Dick Howser Stadium • Tallahassee, FL	**W** 7–3	**Holton (5–1)**	Eubanks (5–3)	None	4,010	22–15	8–9
Apr 17	#4 Clemson		Dick Howser Stadium • Tallahassee, FL	**W** 7–6	**Byrd (2–1)**	Hennessy (1–1)	None	4,046	23–15	9–9
Apr 19	Stetson*		Dick Howser Stadium • Tallahassee, FL	**W** 7–3	**Kwiatkowski (1–0)**	Senger (0–2)	None	3,937	24–15	
Apr 21	at Miami (FL)		Alex Rodriguez Park at Mark Light Field • Coral Gables, FL	**W** 6–3	**Voyles (3–0)**	Bargfeldt (4–3)	**Carlton (3)**	3,523	25–15	10–9
Apr 22	at Miami (FL)		Mark Light Field at Alex Rodriguez Park • Coral Gables, FL	**L** 4–5^{10}	Cabezas (1–2)	**Byrd (2–2)**	None	4,999	25–16	10–10
Apr 23	at Miami (FL)		Mark Light Field at Alex Rodriguez Park • Coral Gables, FL	Cancelled						
Apr 25	at Stetson*		Melching Field at Conrad Park • DeLand, FL	**W** 11–5	**Parrish (4–2)**	Stark (2–3)	None	1,798	26–16	
Apr 28	#12 Virginia		Dick Howser Stadium • Tallahassee, FL	**W** 6–4	**Haney (2–2)**	Harrington (3–2)	**Carlton (4)**	4,021	27–16	11–10
Apr 29	#12 Virginia		Dick Howser Stadium • Tallahassee, FL	**L** 0–8	Haseley (7–1)	**Karp (0–3)**	Doyle (12)	4,171	27–17	11–11
Apr 30	#12 Virginia		Dick Howser Stadium • Tallahassee, FL	**L** 5–7	Murdock (3–1)	**Holton (5–2)**	Bettinger (1)	4,133	27–18	11–12

May

Date	Opponent	Rank	Site/stadium	Score	Win	Loss	Save	Attendance	Overall Record	ACC Record
May 5	Pacific*		Dick Howser Stadium • Tallahassee, FL	**W** 9–8	**Carlton (3–3)**	Arobio (3–4)	None	3,647	28–18	
May 6	Pacific*		Dick Howser Stadium • Tallahassee, FL	**W** 18–5	**Holton (6–2)**	Shreve (1–5)	**Voyles (1)**	3,994	29–18	
May 6	Pacific*		Dick Howser Stadium • Tallahassee, FL	**W** 5–3	**Karp (1–3)**	Casad (2–3)	None	3,994	30–18	
May 7	Pacific*		Dick Howser Stadium • Tallahassee, FL	**W** 5–3	**Parrish (5–2)**	Reynoso (4–6)	**Byrd (1)**	3,719	31–18	
May 9	Jacksonville*		Dick Howser Stadium • Tallahassee, FL	**W** 21–2^{8}	**Zirzow (2–1)**	Cassala (0–3)	None	3,716	32–18	
May 13	#23 Wake Forest		Dick Howser Stadium • Tallahassee, FL	**L** 3–4	Peluse (3–1)	**Sands (5–3)**	Roberts (6)	3,887	32–19	11–13
May 13	#23 Wake Forest		Dick Howser Stadium • Tallahassee, FL	**W** 4–0	**Holton (7–2)**	Sellers (3–5)	None	4,658	33–19	12–13
May 14	#23 Wake Forest		Dick Howser Stadium • Tallahassee, FL	**L** 9–10	McCarren (5–3)	**Parrish (5–3)**	None	3,835	33–20	12–14
May 18	at #2 Louisville		Jim Patterson Stadium • Louisville, KY	**W** 12–9	**Voyles (4–0)**	Sparger (4–1)	**Carlton (5)**	3,487	34–20	13–14
May 19	at #2 Louisville		Jim Patterson Stadium • Louisville, KY	**W** 8–2	**Holton (8–2)**	McClure (7–2)	None	3,359	35–20	14–14
May 20	at #2 Louisville		Jim Patterson Stadium • Louisville, KY	Cancelled						

Postseason
ACC Tournament

Date	Opponent	Rank	Site/stadium	Score	Win	Loss	Save	Attendance	Overall Record	ACCT Record
May 24	vs. (12) Notre Dame	(8)	Louisville Slugger Field • Louisville, KY	**W** 5–3^{12}	**Karp (2–3)**	Guenther (2–6)	None	2,944	36–20	1–0
May 26	vs. #4 (1) Louisville	(8)	Louisville Slugger Field • Louisville, KY	**W** 6–2	**Holton (9–2)**	McClure (7–3)	None	8,843	37–20	2–0
May 27	vs. (9) Duke	(8)	Louisville Slugger Field • Louisville, KY (Semifinal)	**W** 5–1	**Sands (6–3)**	Laskey (4–5)	None		38–20	3–0
May 28	vs. #5 (2) North Carolina	(8)	Louisville Slugger Field • Louisville, KY (Championship)	**W** 7–3	**Byrd (3–2)**	Hiatt (4–2)	None	4,772	39–20	4–0

NCAA tournament

Date	Opponent	Rank	Site/stadium	Score	Win	Loss	Save	Attendance	Overall Record	NCAAT Record
Jun 2	(4) Tennessee Tech	#18 (1)	Dick Howser Stadium • Tallahassee, FL (Tallahassee Regional)	**L** 1–3	Moths (5–1)	**Carlton (3–4)**	None	3,514	39–21	0–1
Jun 3	(2) UCF	#18 (1)	Dick Howser Stadium • Tallahassee, FL (Tallahassee Regional)	**W** 6–1	**Holton (10–2)**	Williams (5–4)	None	2,967	40–21	1–1
Jun 4	(4) Tennessee Tech	#18 (1)	Dick Howser Stadium • Tallahassee, FL (Tallahassee Regional)	**W** 5–3	**Byrd (4–2)**	Roberts (1–4)	**Carlton (6)**	2,872	41–21	2–1
Jun 4	(3) Auburn	#18 (1)	Dick Howser Stadium • Tallahassee, FL (Tallahassee Regional)	**W** 8–7^{10}	**Carlton (4–4)**	Mitchell (5–4)	None	2,872	42–21	3–1
Jun 5	(3) Auburn	#18 (1)	Dick Howser Stadium • Tallahassee, FL (Tallahassee Regional)	**W** 6–0	**Zirzow (3–1)**	Klobosits (0–1)	None	4,211	43–21	4–1
Jun 10	#13 Sam Houston State	#10 (12)	Dick Howser Stadium • Tallahassee, FL (Tallahassee Super Regional)	**W** 7–6	**Carlton (5–4)**	Mikolajchak (0–4)	None	4,253	44–21	5–1
Jun 11	#13 Sam Houston State	#10 (12)	Dick Howser Stadium • Tallahassee, FL (Tallahassee Super Regional)	**W** 19–0	**Parrish (6–3)**	Donica (9–3)	None	4,391	45–21	6–1

College World Series

Date	Opponent	Rank	Site/stadium	Score	Win	Loss	Save	Attendance	Overall Record	CWS Record
Jun 17	vs. #2 (4) LSU	#6 (12)	TD Ameritrade Park • Omaha, NE	**L** 4–5	Poche (11–3)	**Holton (10–3)**	Hess (2)	25,305	45–22	0–1
Jun 19	vs. #7 Cal State Fullerton	#6 (12)	TD Ameritrade Park • Omaha, NE	**W** 6–4	**Haney (3–2)**	Pabich (1–3)	None	17,229	46–22	1–1
Jun 21	vs. #2 (4) LSU	#6 (12)	TD Ameritrade Park • Omaha, NE	**L** 4–7	Poche (12–3)	**Sands (6–4)**	None	22,872	46–23	1–2

Legend: = Win = Loss = Postponement
Bold = Florida State team member
Rankings from Collegiate Baseball; parenthesis indicate tournament seedings.

== Rankings ==
Ranking movements Legend: ██ Increase in ranking ██ Decrease in ranking — = Not ranked RV = Received votes ( ) = First-place votes
	Week																		
Poll	Pre	1	2	3	4	5	6	7	8	9	10	11	12	13	14	15	16	17	Final
Coaches'	5	5*	5*	3	3 (5)	11	10	19	25	RV	RV	RV	25	RV	RV	17	17*	17*	6
Baseball America	2	2	2	2	2	14	12	24	—	—	—	—	—	—	—	15	15*	15*	6
Collegiate Baseball^	9	9	10	8	6	18	12	—	—	—	—	—	—	—	—	18	10	6	6
NCBWA†	4	4	5	3	4	12	10	20	28	—	RV	RV	RV	RV	27	18	10	10*	6

^ Collegiate Baseball ranked 40 teams in their preseason poll, but only ranked 30 teams weekly during the season.
† NCBWA ranks 30 teams in their preseason poll, but only ranks 25 teams weekly during the season.
* A new poll was not released for this week, so for comparison purposes, the previous week's ranking is inserted in this week's slot.

== Awards ==
=== Watchlists ===
- Golden Spikes Award

Dylan Busby
Taylor Walls

=== Honors ===
Weekly Awards
Player	Award	Date Awarded	Ref.
Tyler Holton	ACC Co-Pitcher of the Week ACC Pitcher of the Week ACC Co-Pitcher of the Week; National Player of the Week ACC Pitcher of the Week	February 21–26; February 28-March 5 March 28-April 2- May 9-May 14	
Dylan Busby	ACC Player of the Week; NCBWA Player of the Week; Collegiate Baseball Player of the Week	April 17–22	

==== All-ACC ====
Name	Selection
Tyler Holton	First Team
Quincy Nieporte	Second Team
Dylan Busby	Third Team
J.C. Flowers	Freshman Team
Drew Mendoza	Freshman Team

==== All-Americans ====
Name	Selection
Tyler Holton	Second Team (Baseball America); First Team (D1 Baseball)
Drew Mendoza	Freshman Team (Collegiate Baseball)

== MLB draft ==
The following players were selected in the 2017 MLB draft:

Round	Pick	Name	Position	Team
3	79	Taylor Walls	Infielder	Tampa Bay Rays
3	88	Dylan Busby	Infielder	Pittsburgh Pirates
26	773	Quincy Nieporte	Infielder	Philadelphia Phillies
29	865	Cobi Johnson	Pitcher	Los Angeles Angels
32	965	Drew Carlton	Pitcher	Detroit Tigers
33	986	Alec Byrd	Pitcher	Colorado Rockies
34	1,035	Andrew Karp	Pitcher	Chicago Cubs
35	1,049	Tyler Holton	Pitcher	Miami Marlins
38	1,144	Jim Voyles	Pitcher	St. Louis Cardinals
