= 2017 ACC tournament =

2017 ACC tournament may refer to:

- 2017 ACC men's basketball tournament
- 2017 ACC women's basketball tournament
- 2017 ACC men's soccer tournament
- 2017 ACC women's soccer tournament
- 2017 Atlantic Coast Conference baseball tournament
- 2017 Atlantic Coast Conference softball tournament
