= 2017 Miami Hurricanes baseball team =

American college baseball season

2017 Miami Hurricanes baseball
- Conference: Atlantic Coast Conference
- Record: 31–27 (16–13 ACC)
- Head coach: Jim Morris (24rd season)
- Assistant coaches: Gino DiMare (18th season); J.D. Arteaga (15th season); Norberto Lopez (2nd season); Blake Tekotte (1st season)
- Home stadium: Alex Rodriguez Park at Mark Light Field

2017 Atlantic Coast Conference baseball standings
	Conf.				Overall
Team	W		L	PCT	W		L	PCT
Atlantic
No. 5 Louisville ^{x}‍‍‍^{y}	23	–	6	.793	53	–	12	.815
No. 12 Wake Forest ‍‍‍^{y}	19	–	11	.633	43	–	20	.683
No. 25 Clemson ‍‍‍^{y}	17	–	13	.567	42	–	21	.667
No. 30 NC State ‍‍‍^{y}	16	–	14	.533	36	–	25	.590
No. 6 Florida State ‍‍‡‍^{y}	14	–	14	.500	46	–	23	.667
Boston College ‍‍‍	11	–	19	.367	25	–	28	.472
Notre Dame ‍‍‍	10	–	20	.333	26	–	32	.448
Coastal
No. 17 North Carolina ^{x}‍‍‍^{y}	23	–	7	.767	49	–	14	.778
No. 21 Virginia ‍‍‍^{y}	18	–	12	.600	43	–	16	.729
Miami (FL) ‍‍‍	16	–	13	.552	31	–	27	.534
Duke ‍‍‍	12	–	18	.400	30	–	28	.517
Georgia Tech ‍‍‍	11	–	19	.367	27	–	28	.491
Pittsburgh ‍‍‍	9	–	21	.300	23	–	30	.434
Virginia Tech ‍‍‍	9	–	21	.300	23	–	32	.418
x – Division champion ‡ – Tournament champion y – Invited to the NCAA tournament Rankings from Collegiate Baseball

The 2017 Miami Hurricanes baseball team represented the University of Miami during the 2017 NCAA Division I baseball season. The Hurricanes played their home games at Alex Rodriguez Park at Mark Light Field as a member of the Atlantic Coast Conference. They were led by head coach Jim Morris, in his 24th season at Miami.

The Hurricanes failed to qualify for the NCAA Division I Baseball Championship, ending a 44-year streak of making the postseason tournament. The streak had been the longest in NCAA history (for any sport, and in any division).

== Roster ==
2017 Miami Hurricanes roster
Pitchers: 19 – Jeb Bargfeldt – Junior; 18 – Michael Mediavilla – Freshman; 27 – Daniel Epstein – (redshirt) Sophomore; 53 – Anthony Masiello – Freshman; 52 – Frankie Bartow – Sophomore; 35 – Andrew Cabezas – Sophomore; 45 – Ryan Guerra – Senior; 39 – Cooper Hammond – (redshirt) Junior; 55 – Jesse Lepore – Junior; 22 – Albert Maury Jr. – Freshman; 37 – Keven Pimentel – (redshirt) Sophomore; 32 – Evan McKendry – Freshman; 30 – Michael Perez – Junior; 34 – Daniel Rivero – Freshman; 47 – Enrique Sosa – (redshirt) Senior; 14 – Mason Studstill – Freshman; 0 – Gregory Veliz – Freshman	Catchers: 24 – Michael Amditis – Freshman; 40 – Joe Gomez – Senior; 28 – Alex Sanchez – (redshirt) Sophomore; Infielders: 4 – Johnny Ruiz – Senior; 10 – Romy Gonzalez – Sophomore; 17 – Christopher Barr – (redshirt) Senior; 2 – Randy Batista- Senior; 7 – Brandon Gali – Junior; 16 – Edgar Michelangeli – (redshirt) Senior	Outfielders: 43 – Nico Baldor – Freshman; 31 – Barry Buchowski – Senior; 44 – Michael Burns – Junior; 9 – Carl Chester – Junior; 51 – James Davison – Junior; 21 – Hunter Tackett – Junior

== Coaching staff ==
Name	Position	Seasons at Miami	Alma mater
Jim Morris	Head coach	24	Elon University (1973)
Gino DiMare	Assistant coach	18	University of Miami (1992)
J.D. Arteaga	Assistant coach	15	University of Miami (2002)
Norberto Lopez	Assistant coach	2	Nova Southeastern University (1999)
Blake Tekotte	Student coach	1	University of Miami

== Schedule ==
Legend
	Miami win
	Miami loss
	Postponement
**Bold**	Miami team member

2017 Miami Hurricanes baseball game log
Regular season

February
Date	Opponent	Rank	Site/stadium	Score	Win	Loss	Save	Attendance	Overall record	ACC record
February 17	Rutgers	#17	Alex Rodriguez Park at Mark Light Field • Coral Gables, FL	**W** 3–0	**Lepore (1–0)**	O'Reilly (0–1)	**Bartow (1)**	3,135	1–0	
February 18	Rutgers	#17	Alex Rodriguez Park • Coral Gables, FL	**W** 9–5	**Bargfeld (1–0)**	Brito (0–1)	None	3,109	2–0	
February 19	Rutgers	#17	Alex Rodriguez Park • Coral Gables, FL	**L** 17–6	Reardon (1–0)	**Mediavilla (0–1)**	None	2,860	2–1	
February 24	at #2 Florida	#17	Alfred A. McKethan Stadium • Gainesville, FL	**L** 1–0	Faedo (1–0)	**Lepore (1–1)**	Rubio	5,385	2–2	
February 25	at #2 Florida	#17	Alfred A. McKethan Stadium • Gainesville, FL	**L** 2–0	Singer (2–0)	**Bargfeld (1–1)**	Rubio (2)	6,160	2–3	
February 26	at #2 Florida	#17	Alfred A. McKethan Stadium • Gainesville, FL	**L** 6–2	Kowar (2–0)	**Mediavilla (0–2)**	None	5,262	2–4	

March
Date	Opponent	Rank	Site/stadium	Score	Win	Loss	Save	Attendance	Overall record	ACC record
March 1	at Florida Atlantic	#17	FAU Baseball Stadium • Boca Raton, FL	**W** 5–2	**McKendry (1–0)**	Marman (0–1)	**Bartow (2)**	1,729	3–4	
March 3	Dartmouth	#17	Alex Rodriguez Park • Coral Gables, FL	**L** 1–0	Sulsar (2–0)	**Lepore (1–2)**	Burkholder (2)	2,113	3–5	
March 4	Dartmouth	#17	Alex Rodriguez Park • Coral Gables, FL	**W** 3–2	**Bartow (1–0)**	Peterson (0–1)	None	3,088	4–5	
March 5	Dartmouth	#17	Alex Rodriguez Park • Coral Gables, FL	**L** 5–0	Danielak (2–0)	**Mediavilla (0–3)**	None	2,627	4–6	
March 7	FIU		Alex Rodriguez Park • Coral Gables, FL	**L** 12–1	Garcia (1–2)	**Veliz (0–1)**	None	2,440	4–7	
March 8	at FIU		FIU Baseball Stadium • Miami, FL	**L** 3–2	Raiden (1–0)	**Bartow (1–1)**	None	1,564	4–8	
March 10	#23 Georgia Tech		Alex Rodriguez Park • Coral Gables, FL	**W** 10–8	**Maury Jr (1–0)**	Curry (3–1)	**Bartow (3)**	2,546	5–8	1–0
March 11	#23 Georgia Tech		Alex Rodriguez Park • Coral Gables, FL	**L** 7–5 ^{(11)}	Ryan (1–0)	**Cabezas (0–1)**	Dulaney (1)	2,577	5–9	1–1
March 12	#23 Georgia Tech		Alex Rodriguez Park • Coral Gables, FL	**W** 17–7	**Mediavilla (1–3)**	Lee (0–1)	None	2,057	6–9	2–1
March 14	Maine		Alex Rodriguez Park • Coral Gables, FL	**W** 4–3	**McKendry (2–0)**	Delaite (0–1)	**Cabezas (1)**	2,327	7–9	
March 15	Maine		Alex Rodriguez Park • Coral Gables, FL	**W** 7–2	**Veliz (1–1)**	Murphy (0–2)	**Bartow (4)**	2,431	8–9	
March 17	at NC State		Doak Field • Raleigh, NC	**L** 5–3	Staley (1–0)	**Cabezas (0–2)**	None	2,463	8–10	2–2
March 18	at NC State		Doak Field • Raleigh, NC	**L** 5–2	DeJuneas (2–0)	**McKendry (2–1)**	Staley (4)	2,511	8–11	2–3
March 19	at NC State		Doak Field • Raleigh, NC	**W** 7–5	**Mediavilla (2–3)**	Feeney (2–1)	**Bartow (5)**	2,897	9–11	3–3
March 22	Florida Atlantic		Alex Rodriguez Park • Coral Gables, FL	**W** 7–5	**Veliz (2–1)**	Labsan (1–1)	None	2,375	10–11	
March 24	at #8 North Carolina		Boshamer Stadium • Chapel Hill, NC	**L** 7–2	Bukauskas (4–0)	**Lepore (1–3)**	None	1,063	10–12	3–4
March 25	at #8 North Carolina		Boshamer Stadium • Chapel Hill, NC	**L** 6–3	Daniels (2–0)	**Bargfeldt (1–2)**	Hiatt (9)	2,476	10–13	3–5
March 26	at #8 North Carolina		Boshamer Stadium • Chapel Hill, NC	**W** 6–2	**Mediavilla (3–3)**	Aker (1–1)	**Bartow (6)**	1,110	11–13	4–5
March 29	at #12 Florida Gulf Coast		Swanson Stadium • Fort Myers, FL	**L** 3–0	Leon (3–1)	**Veliz (2–2)**	Koerner (9)	2,074	11–14	
March 31	Wake Forest		Alex Rodriguez Park • Coral Gables, FL	**L** 2–1	Dunshee (5–1)	**Lepore (1–4)**	Roberts (2)	2,844	11–15	4–6

April
Date	Opponent	Rank	Site/stadium	Score	Win	Loss	Save	Attendance	Overall record	ACC record
April 1	Wake Forest		Alex Rodriguez Park • Coral Gables, FL	**W** 5–1	**Bargfeldt (2–2)**	Sellers (3–2)		2880	12–15	5–6
April 2	Wake Forest		Alex Rodriguez Park • Coral Gables, FL	**L** 9–0	Johnstone (4–0)	**Mediavilla (3–4)**		2,431	12–16	5–7
April 5	St. Thomas		Alex Rodriguez Park • Coral Gables, FL	**W** 14–2	**Veliz (3–2)**	Arauz (2–2)		2,446	13–16	
April 8	Duke		Alex Rodriguez Park • Coral Gables, FL	**W** 9–7	**Maury Jr (2–0)**	Labosky (1–2)		2,839	14–16	6–7
April 9	Duke		Alex Rodriguez Park • Coral Gables, FL	**W** 7–0	**Bargfeldt (3–2)**	Laskey (2–3)		2,772	15–16	7–7
April 10	Duke		Alex Rodriguez Park • Coral Gables, FL	**L** 5–2	Labosky (2–2)	**Bartow (1–2)**		2,458	15–17	7–8
April 12	Florida Gulf Coast		Alex Rodriguez Park • Coral Gables, FL	**L** 5–4	Hamilton (1–0)	**Maury Jr (2–1)**	Hering (2)	2,739	15–18	
April 14	at Pittsburgh		Petersen Sports Complex • Pittsburgh, PA	**L** 10–3	Mersing (1–1)	**Lepore (1–5)**		338	15–19	7–9
April 14	at Pittsburgh		Petersen Sports Complex • Pittsburgh, PA	**W** 1–0	**Bargfeldt (4–2)**	Hammer (0–3)	**Bartow (7)**	737	16–19	8–9
April 15	at Pittsburgh		Petersen Sports Complex • Pittsburgh, PA	**W** 5–3	**Mediavilla (4–4)**	Falk (3–4)	**Bartow (8)**	817	17–19	9–9
April 19	Florida Atlantic		Alex Rodriguez Park • Coral Gables, FL	**W** 8–2	**McKendry (3–1)**	Labsan (1–2)		2,335	18–19	
April 21	Florida State		Alex Rodriguez Park • Coral Gables, FL	**L** 6–3	Voyles (3–0)	**Bargfeldt (4–3)**	Carlton (3)	3,523	18–20	9–10
April 22	Florida State		Alex Rodriguez Park • Coral Gables, FL	**W** 5–4 ^{(10)}	**Cabezas (1–2)**	Byrd (2–2)		4,999	19–20	10–10
April 23	Florida State		Alex Rodriguez Park • Coral Gables, FL	Canceled						
April 25	at FIU		FIU Baseball Stadium • Miami, FL	**W** 8–7	**Cabezas (2–2)**	LoBrutto (1–2)	**Bartow (9)**	1,658	20–20	
April 26	FIU		Alex Rodriguez Park • Coral Gables, FL	**L** 5–4	Agis (1–2)	**Bartow (1–3)**		2,493	20–21	
April 28	at Boston College		Eddie Pellagrini Diamond at John Shea Field • Chestnut Hill, MA	**W** 3–0	**Bargfeldt (5–3)**	Stevens (4–5)	**Bartow (10)**	652	21–21	11–10
April 29	at Boston College		Eddie Pellagrini Diamond at John Shea Field • Chestnut Hill, MA	**W** 14–5	**Cabezas (3–2)**	Casey (2–2)		1,061	22–21	12–10
April 30	at Boston College		Eddie Pellagrini Diamond at John Shea Field • Chestnut Hill, MA	**L** 9–2	Rapp (2–2)	**Veliz (3–3)**		527	22–22	12–11

May
Date	Opponent	Rank	Site/stadium	Score	Win	Loss	Save	Attendance	Overall record	ACC record
May 5	Bethune Cookman		Alex Rodriguez Park • Coral Gables, FL	**W** 6–5	**Cabezas (4–2)**	Calamita (2–2)	**Bartow (11)**	2,372	23–22	
May 6	Bethune-Cookman		Alex Rodriguez Park • Coral Gables, FL	**L** 7–3	Norris (6–1)	**Meidavilla (4–5)**		2,587	23–23	
May 7	Bethune-Cookman		Alex Rodriguez Park • Coral Gables, FL	**W** 7–1	**Veliz (4–3)**	Krull 5–2		2,433	24–23	
May 10	UCF		Alex Rodriguez Park • Coral Gables, FL	**L** 5–2	Ward (4–0)	**McKendry (3–2)**		2,416	24–24	
May 13	at #10 Virginia		Davenport Field • Charlottesville, VA	**W** 5–1	**Bargfeldt (6–3)**	Lynch (6–3)		3,669	25–24	13–11
May 13	at #10 Virginia		Davenport Field • Charlottesville, VA	**L** 13–6	Bettinger (8–0)	**Veliz (4–4)**		4,129	25–25	13–12
May 14	at #10 Virginia		Davenport Field • Charlottesville, VA	**L** 7–4	Doyle (2–1)	**Cabezas (4–3)**		3,211	25–26	13–13
May 16	Florida Gulf Coast		Alex Rodriguez Park • Coral Gables, FL	**W** 5–1	**McKendry (4–2)**	Grey (3–3)		2,215	26–26	
May 19	Virginia Tech		Alex Rodriguez Park • Coral Gables, FL	**W** 4–2	**Bargfeldt (7–3)**	Coward (5–4)	**Cabezas (2)**		27–26	14–13
May 19	Virginia Tech		Alex Rodriguez Park • Coral Gables, FL	**W** 3–1	**Veliz (5–4)**	Scheetz (4–3)	**Bartow (12)**	2,737	28–26	15–13
May 20	Virginia Tech		Alex Rodriguez Park • Coral Gables, FL	**W** 7–5 ^{(10)}	**Maury Jr (3–1)**	McGarity (2–6)		3,039	29–26	16–13

Postseason

ACC Tournament
Date	Opponent	Rank	Site/stadium	Score	Win	Loss	Save	Attendance	Overall record	ACCT Record
May 23	Georgia Tech		Louisville Slugger Field • Louisville, KY	**W** 6–5 ^{(13)}	**Cabezas (5–3)**	Ryan (3–5)		2,739	30–26	1–0
May 26	#16 Wake Forest		Louisville Slugger Field • Louisville, KY	**W** 5–2	**Veliz (6–4)**	Roberts (1–4)	**Cabezas (3)**		31–26	2–0
May 27	#2 North Carolina		Louisville Slugger Field • Louisville, KY	**L** 12–4	Hutchinson (7–4)	**Lepore (1–6)**		4,926	31–27	2–1

== Rankings ==
Ranking movements Legend: ██ Increase in ranking ██ Decrease in ranking — = Not ranked
	Week																		
Poll	Pre	1	2	3	4	5	6	7	8	9	10	11	12	13	14	15	16	17	Final
Coaches'	17	17*	17	—	—	—	—	—	—	—	—	—	—	—	—				
Baseball America	—	—	—	—	—	—	—	—	—	—	—	—	—	—	—				
Collegiate Baseball^	8	8	21	—	—	—	—	—	—	—	—	—	—	—	—				
NCBWA†	18	17	—	—	—	—	—	—	—	—	—	—	—	—	—				

^ Collegiate Baseball ranked 40 teams in their preseason poll, but only ranked 30 teams weekly during the season.
† NCBWA ranks 30 teams in their preseason poll, but only ranks 25 teams weekly during the season.
* A new poll was not released for this week, so for comparison purposes, the previous week's ranking is inserted in this week's slot.

== Awards and honors ==
Jeb Bargfeldt

- All-ACC 2nd Team
