= 2017 Atlantic Coast Conference baseball tournament =

American college baseball tournament

- Format: See below
- Finals site: Louisville Slugger Field; Louisville, KY
- Champions: Florida State (7th title)
- Winning coach: Mike Martin (7th title)
- MVP: Jackson Lueck (Florida State)
- Television: ACCRSN (round robin)/ ESPN2 (championship)

2017 Atlantic Coast Conference baseball standings
	Conf.				Overall
Team	W		L	PCT	W		L	PCT
Atlantic
No. 5 Louisville ^{x}‍‍‍^{y}	23	–	6	.793	53	–	12	.815
No. 12 Wake Forest ‍‍‍^{y}	19	–	11	.633	43	–	20	.683
No. 25 Clemson ‍‍‍^{y}	17	–	13	.567	42	–	21	.667
No. 30 NC State ‍‍‍^{y}	16	–	14	.533	36	–	25	.590
No. 6 Florida State ‍‍‡‍^{y}	14	–	14	.500	46	–	23	.667
Boston College ‍‍‍	11	–	19	.367	25	–	28	.472
Notre Dame ‍‍‍	10	–	20	.333	26	–	32	.448
Coastal
No. 17 North Carolina ^{x}‍‍‍^{y}	23	–	7	.767	49	–	14	.778
No. 21 Virginia ‍‍‍^{y}	18	–	12	.600	43	–	16	.729
Miami (FL) ‍‍‍	16	–	13	.552	31	–	27	.534
Duke ‍‍‍	12	–	18	.400	30	–	28	.517
Georgia Tech ‍‍‍	11	–	19	.367	27	–	28	.491
Pittsburgh ‍‍‍	9	–	21	.300	23	–	30	.434
Virginia Tech ‍‍‍	9	–	21	.300	23	–	32	.418
x – Division champion ‡ – Tournament champion y – Invited to the NCAA tournament Rankings from Collegiate Baseball

The 2017 Atlantic Coast Conference baseball tournament was held from May 23 through 28 at Louisville Slugger Field in Louisville, Kentucky. The annual tournament determines the conference champion of the Division I Atlantic Coast Conference for college baseball. The tournament champion receives the league's automatic bid to the 2017 NCAA Division I baseball tournament. This was the last of 19 athletic championship events held by the conference in the 2016–17 academic year.

On September 14, 2016, the ACC announced that the 2017 tournament originally slated to be played in Durham, North Carolina, along with neutral site championships for seven other sports, would be moved out of the state of North Carolina due to the controversial NC House Bill 2. On October 4, 2016, it was announced that Louisville Slugger Field in Louisville, Kentucky, would be the new host venue for 2017.

Florida State defeated North Carolina in the championship game to win the tournament for the seventh time overall, and the second time in three seasons.

== Format and seeding ==
The tournament format, along with the number of eligible teams, was changed for the 2017 tournament. The winner of each seven team division and the top ten other teams based on conference winning percentage, regardless of division, from the conference's regular season will be seeded one through twelve. Seeds one and two are awarded to the two division winners. Teams are then divided into four pools of three teams each, with the winners advancing to a single-elimination bracket for the championship. On May 24, due to inclement weather, the schedule for the tournament was altered. Additionally, Jim Paterson Stadium on the University of Louisville campus was added as a site.

== Schedule and results ==
=== Schedule ===
Game	Time*	Matchup^{#}	Location	Television	Attendance
Tuesday, May 23
1	11:00 a.m.	#10 Georgia Tech vs. #6 Miami	Louisville Slugger Field	ACCRSN	2,739
2	3:00 p.m.	#11 Boston College vs. #7 NC State	Louisville Slugger Field	ACCRSN	
3	7:00 p.m.	#9 Duke vs. #5 Clemson	Louisville Slugger Field	ACCRSN	3,381
Wednesday, May 24
4	11:00 a.m.	#12 Notre Dame vs. #8 Florida State	Louisville Slugger Field	ACCRSN	2,944
Thursday, May 25
5	11:00 a.m.	#2 North Carolina vs. #11 Boston College	Louisville Slugger Field	ACCRSN	
6	12:00 p.m.	#3 Wake Forest vs. #10 Georgia Tech	Jim Patterson Stadium	ACC Network Extra	324
7	3:00 p.m.	#4 Virginia vs. #9 Duke	Louisville Slugger Field	ACCRSN	2,708
8	7:00 p.m.	#1 Louisville vs. #12 Notre Dame	Louisville Slugger Field	ACCRSN	6,945
Friday, May 26
9	11:00 a.m.	#6 Miami vs. #3 Wake Forest	Louisville Slugger Field	ACCRSN	
10	12:00 p.m.	#5 Clemson vs. #4 Virginia	Jim Patterson Stadium	ACC Network Extra	598
11	3:00 p.m.	#8 Florida State vs. #1 Louisville	Louisville Slugger Field	ACCRSN	8,843
12	7:00 p.m.	#7 NC State vs. #2 North Carolina	Louisville Slugger Field	ACCRSN	4,659
Saturday, May 27
Semifinal 1	1:00 p.m.	#8 Florida State vs. #9 Duke	Louisville Slugger Field	ACCRSN	
Semifinal 2	5:00 p.m.	#2 North Carolina vs. #6 Miami	Louisville Slugger Field	ACCRSN	4,926
Championship – Sunday, May 28
Championship	12:00 p.m.	#8 Florida State vs. #2 North Carolina	Louisville Slugger Field	ESPN2	4,772
*Game times in EDT. # – Rankings denote tournament seed.

== Pool Play ==
=== Pool A ===
Pos	Team	Pld	W	L	RF	RA	RD	PCT	Qualification
1	Florida State	2	2	0	11	5	+6	1.000	Advance to Playoff round
2	Louisville	2	1	1	12	9	+3	.500	
3	Notre Dame	2	0	2	6	15	−9	.000	

Source: 247Sports

=== Pool B ===
Pos	Team	Pld	W	L	RF	RA	RD	PCT	Qualification
1	North Carolina	2	2	0	22	4	+18	1.000	Advance to Playoff round
2	NC State	2	1	1	10	13	−3	.500	
3	Boston College	2	0	2	1	16	−15	.000	

Source: 247Sports

=== Pool C ===
Pos	Team	Pld	W	L	RF	RA	RD	PCT	Qualification
1	Miami	2	2	0	11	7	+4	1.000	Advance to Playoff round
2	Wake Forest	2	1	1	7	9	−2	.500	
3	Georgia Tech	2	0	2	9	11	−2	.000	

Source: 247Sports

=== Pool D ===
Pos	Team	Pld	W	L	RF	RA	RD	PCT	Qualification
1	Duke	2	2	0	10	6	+4	1.000	Advance to Playoff round
2	Virginia	2	1	1	13	6	+7	.500	
3	Clemson	2	0	2	5	16	−11	.000	

Source: 247Sports

== Elimination round ==
Semifinals
8	Florida State	5
9	Duke	1
2	UNC	12
6	Miami	4

Championship
8	Florida State	7
2	UNC	3

=== Championship game ===
Sunday, May 28 12:00 p.m.
Team	1	2	3	4	5	6	7	8	9	R	H	E
#8 Florida State	0	0	1	0	0	0	1	5	0	7	9	2
#2 North Carolina	0	3	0	0	0	0	0	0	0	3	7	0
WP: Alec Byrd (3–2) LP: Josh Hiatt (4–2); Home runs: FSU: Drew Mendoza 2 (7); UNC: Tyler Lynn (7); Attendance: 4,772; Notes: Game Duration - 3:39; Boxscore

== All-Tournament Team ==
Position	Player	School
Catcher	Chris Proctor	Duke
1st Base	Drew Mendoza	Florida State
2nd Base	Nick Podkul	Notre Dame
3rd Base	Dylan Busby	Florida State
Shortstop	Logan Warmoth	North Carolina
Outfield	Jackson Lueck‡	Florida State
Outfield	Brian Miller	North Carolina
Outfield	Tyler Lynn	North Carolina
Utility/DH	Ashton McGee	North Carolina
Pitcher	Tyler Holton	Florida State
Pitcher	J. B. Bukauskas	North Carolina

‡ - Tournament MVP
