= 2017 Louisville Cardinals baseball team =

American college baseball season

2017 Louisville Cardinals baseball

ACC Regular season Champions

NCAA tournament, Louisville Regional NCAA tournament, Louisville Super Regional College World Series
- Conference: Atlantic Coast Conference

Ranking
- Coaches: No. 5
- CB: No. 5
- Record: 52–9 (23–6 ACC)
- Head coach: Dan McDonnell (11th season)
- Assistant coaches: Roger Williams (11th season); Eric Snider (3rd season); Adam Vrable (3rd season)
- Captains: Jake Sparger; Ryan Summers; Logan Taylor
- Home stadium: Jim Patterson Stadium

2017 Atlantic Coast Conference baseball standings
	Conf.				Overall
Team	W		L	PCT	W		L	PCT
Atlantic
No. 5 Louisville ^{x}‍‍‍^{y}	23	–	6	.793	53	–	12	.815
No. 12 Wake Forest ‍‍‍^{y}	19	–	11	.633	43	–	20	.683
No. 25 Clemson ‍‍‍^{y}	17	–	13	.567	42	–	21	.667
No. 30 NC State ‍‍‍^{y}	16	–	14	.533	36	–	25	.590
No. 6 Florida State ‍‍‡‍^{y}	14	–	14	.500	46	–	23	.667
Boston College ‍‍‍	11	–	19	.367	25	–	28	.472
Notre Dame ‍‍‍	10	–	20	.333	26	–	32	.448
Coastal
No. 17 North Carolina ^{x}‍‍‍^{y}	23	–	7	.767	49	–	14	.778
No. 21 Virginia ‍‍‍^{y}	18	–	12	.600	43	–	16	.729
Miami (FL) ‍‍‍	16	–	13	.552	31	–	27	.534
Duke ‍‍‍	12	–	18	.400	30	–	28	.517
Georgia Tech ‍‍‍	11	–	19	.367	27	–	28	.491
Pittsburgh ‍‍‍	9	–	21	.300	23	–	30	.434
Virginia Tech ‍‍‍	9	–	21	.300	23	–	32	.418
x – Division champion ‡ – Tournament champion y – Invited to the NCAA tournament Rankings from Collegiate Baseball

The 2017 Louisville Cardinals baseball team represented the University of Louisville during the 2017 NCAA Division I baseball season. The Cardinals played their home games at Jim Patterson Stadium as a member of the Atlantic Coast Conference. They were led by head coach Dan McDonnell, in his eleventh year at Louisville.

Following the conclusion of the regular season, the Cardinals were selected to host their fifth consecutive NCAA Regional. The Cardinals would win both the Louisville Regional and Louisville Super Regional and receive an invitation to the 2017 College World Series before eventually losing to TCU by a score of 3–4. Five players from the team, including Brendan McKay, were selected in the 2017 MLB draft.

== Previous season ==
In 2016, the Cardinals finished as champions of the Atlantic Coast Conference with a record of 46–10, 22–8 in conference play, in their second season in the conference. They qualified for the 2016 Atlantic Coast Conference baseball tournament, where they played in Division B of inter-conference tournament play. The Cardinals would finish 1–2 in the tournament, not advancing to the conference tournament finals.

With the Cardinals finishing the season as regular season champs of the Atlantic Division of the ACC, they would qualify for the 2016 NCAA Division I baseball tournament, and were selected as hosts of the Louisville regional and Louisville Super Regional, if they advanced to that round. The Cardinals would wins three straight matches in the Louisville Regional and would advance to the Super Regional (of which they were hosts) by defeating Western Michigan 6–1, Ohio State 15–3, and Wright State 3–1. In the Super Regional, Louisville hosted UC Santa Barbara in a best-of-three matchup. Louisville would lose the first two games to UC Santa Barbara, ending their playoff run.

== Roster ==
2017 Louisville Cardinals roster
Pitchers: 4 – Adam Elliott – Freshman; 5 – Shay Smiddy – Freshman; 6 – Chandler Dale – Junior; 8 – Nick Bennett – Freshman; 13 – Sam Bordner – Sophomore; 15 – Lincoln Henzman – Junior; 19 – Kade McClure – Junior; 22 – Noah Burkholder – Sophomore; 27 – Bryan Hoeing – Sophomore; 30 – Austin Dickey – Freshman; 31 – Adam Wolf – Sophomore; 32 – Riley Thompson – Sophomore; 38 – Brendan McKay – Junior; 39 – Shane Hummel – Senior; 40 – Rabon Martin – Junior; 41 – Michael McAvene – Freshman; 44 – Jake Sparger – Senior	Catchers: 11 – Zeke Pinkham – Sophomore; 18 – Pat Rumoro – Sophomore; 42 – Colby Fitch – Junior; Infielders: 2 – Tyler Fitzgerald – Freshman; 7 – Devin Mann – Sophomore; 10 – Drew Ellis – Junior; 16 – Justin Lavey – Freshman; 20 – Jake Snider – Freshman; 29 – Devin Hairston – Junior; 34 – Michael Bollmer – Sophomore; 38 – Brendan McKay – Junior; 43 – Logan Wyatt – Freshman	Outfielders: 4 – Adam Elliott – Freshman; 9 – Danny Oriente – Freshman; 17 – Ethan Stringer – Freshman; 24 – Logan Taylor – Senior; 25 – Josh Stowers – Sophomore; 33 – Ryan Summers – Sophomore; 35 – Colin Lyman – senior

== Schedule ==
Legend
	Louisville win
	Louisville loss
	Postponement
**Bold**	Louisville team member

2017 Louisville Cardinals baseball game log
Regular season
February

Date	Opponent	Rank	Site/stadium	Score	Win	Loss	Save	Attendance	Overall record	ACC Record
February 17	vs. Alabama State	#11	Spectrum Field • Clearwater, FL	**W** 7–1	McKay (1–0)	Howe (0–1)	Hoeing (1)	455	1–0	
February 18	vs. Maryland	#11	Spectrum Field • Clearwater, FL	**W** 10–7	Sparger (1–0)	Bloom (0–1)	Henzman (1)	652	2–0	
February 19	vs. Ball State	#11	Spectrum Field • Clearwater, FL	**W** 10–4	Hummel (1–0)	Marquardt (0–1)	None	609	3–0	
February 22	vs. Eastern Kentucky	#11	Jim Patterson Stadium • Louisville, KY	**W** 19–3	Martin (1–0)	Ford (0–1)	None	2,154	4–0	
February 24	Omaha	#11	Jim Patterson Stadium • Louisville, KY	**W** 7–2	McKay (2–0)	Murphy (0–2)	None	1,862	5–0	
February 25	Omaha	#11	Jim Patterson Stadium • Louisville, KY	**W** 10–0	McClure (1–0)	Binger (1–1)	None	825	6–0	
February 26	Omaha	#11	Jim Patterson Stadium • Louisville, KY	**W** 6–0	McAvene (1–0)	Suponchick (0–2)	None	1,056	7–0	

March

Date	Opponent	Rank	Site/stadium	Score	Win	Loss	Save	Attendance	Overall record	ACC Record
March 1	Morehead State	#6	Jim Patterson Stadium • Louisville, KY	**W** 20–2	**Sparger (2–0)**	Stambaugh (0–1)	None	929	8–0	
March 3	Eastern Michigan	#6	Jim Patterson Stadium • Louisville, KY	**W** 13–0	**Bennett (1–0)**	Mattson (2–1)	None	936	9–0	
March 4	Eastern Michigan	#6	Jim Patterson Stadium • Louisville, KY	**W** 3–2	**Thompson (1–0)**	Feldman (0–2)	None	1,077	10–0	
March 5	Eastern Michigan	#6	Jim Patterson Stadium • Louisville, KY	**W** 8–7	**Elliott (1–0)**	Feldman (0–3)	Sparger (1)	3,475	11–0	
March 7	Eastern Kentucky	#5	Turkey Hughes Field • Richmond, KY	Postponed						
March 8	Fort Wayne	#5	Jim Patterson Stadium • Louisville, KY	**W** 12–2	**Bordner (1–0)**	Helm (1–1)	None	1,084	12–0	
March 10	Pittsburgh	#5	Jim Patterson Stadium • Louisville, KY	**W** 3–0	**McKay (3–0)**	Mitchell (0–2)	Henzman (2)	995	13–0	1–0
March 11	Pittsburgh	#5	Jim Patterson Stadium • Louisville, KY	**W** 8–2	**McClure (2–0)**	Pidich (2–1)	None	894	14–0	2–0
March 12	Pittsburgh	#5	Jim Patterson Stadium • Louisville, KY	**W** 3–1	**Bennett (2–0)**	Falk (2–1)	Henzman (3)	1,017	15–0	3–0
March 15	Xavier	#2	Jim Patterson Stadium • Louisville, KY	**W** 13–4	**Martin (2–0)**	Astle (1–1)	None	883	16–0	3–0
March 17	Boston College	#2	Jim Patterson Stadium • Louisville, KY	**W** 6–0	**McKay (4–0)**	Stevens (2–1)	None	620	17–0	4–0
March 18	Boston College	#2	Jim Patterson Stadium • Louisville, KY	**W** 6–4	**McClure (3–0)**	Gill (1–4)	Henzman (4)	958	18–0	5–0
March 19	Boston College	#2	Jim Patterson Stadium • Louisville, KY	**W** 5–3	**Martin (3–0)**	Metzdor (1–3)	Henzman (5)	968	19–0	6–0
March 21	at Cincinnati	#2	Marge Schott Stadium • Cincinnati, OH	**L** 3–6	Kroger (1–0)	**McAvene (1–1)**	Orndorff (4)	1,709	19–1	6–0
March 24	at NC State	#2	Doak Field • Raleigh, NC	**L** 1–3	Adler (3–2)	**McKay (4–1)**	O'Donnell (1)	2,824	19–2	6–1
March 25	at NC State	#2	Doak Field • Raleigh, NC	**W** 7–6	**Henzman (1–0)**	Staley (1–1)	None	3,048	20–2	7–1
March 26	at NC State	#2	Doak Field • Raleigh, NC	**W** 8–1	**Bennett (3–0)**	Wilder (0–2)	None	2,821	21–2	8–1
March 28	Western Kentucky	#2	Jim Patterson Stadium • Louisville, KY	**W** 11–1	**Hummel (2–0)**	Bruner (0–1)	None	3,294	22–2	8–1
March 31	at Virginia	#2	Davenport Field • Charlottesville, VA	**W** 5–2	**Wolf (1–0)**	Harrington (1–1)	Henzman (6)	2,928	23–2	9–1

April

Date	Opponent	Rank	Site/stadium	Score	Win	Loss	Save	Attendance	Overall record	ACC Record
April 1	at Virginia	#2	Davenport Field • Charlottesville, VA	**L** 2–11	Bettinger (4–0)	**McClure (3–1)**	None	3,832	23–3	9–2
April 2	at Virginia	#2	Davenport Field • Charlottesville, VA	**W** 4–3	**Wolf (2–0)**	Doyle (1–1)	Henzman (7)	3,736	24–3	10–2
April 4	Kentucky	#2	Jim Patterson Stadium • Louisville, KY	**W** 5–3	**Hummel (3–0)**	Thompson (2–2)	Henzman (8)	6,210	25–3	10–2
April 7	Wake Forest	#2	Jim Patterson Stadium • Louisville, KY	**L** 1–2	Dunshee (6–1)	**McKay (4–2)**	Roberts (3)	2,931	25–4	10–3
April 8	Wake Forest	#2	Jim Patterson Stadium • Louisville, KY	**W** 7–6	**Sparger (3–0)**	McCarren (2–3)	Henzman (9)	3,104	26–4	11–3
April 9	Wake Forest	#2	Jim Patterson Stadium • Louisville, KY	**W** 7–5	**Wolf (3–0)**	Roberts (1–1)	Bordner (1)	4,056	27–4	12–3
April 11	Purdue	#2	Jim Patterson Stadium • Louisville, KY	**W** 13–2	**Hummel (4–0)**	Dellinger (1–3)	None	1,579	28–4	12–3
April 13	at Georgia Tech	#2	Russ Chandler Stadium • Atlanta, GA	**W** 3–0	**McKay (5–2)**	Schniederjans (0–2)	Henzman (10)	1,215	29–4	13–3
April 14	at Georgia Tech	#2	Russ Chandler Stadium • Atlanta, GA	**W** 10–1	**McClure (4–1)**	Curry (3–4)	None	1,220	30–4	14–3
April 15	at Georgia Tech	#2	Russ Chandler Stadium • Atlanta, GA	**W** 5–4	**Wolf (4–0)**	Ryan (3–2)	Henzman (11)	1,358	31–4	15–3
April 18	at Kentucky	#2	Cliff Hagan Stadium • Lexington, KY	**L** 7–11	Thompson (4–2)	**Hummel (4–1)**	None	4,018	31–5	15–3
April 21	Duke	#2	Jim Patterson Stadium • Louisville, KY	**L** 3–5	Stallings (4–3)	**McKay (5–3)**	Labosky (5)	1,533	31–6	15–4
April 22	Duke	#2	Jim Patterson Stadium • Louisville, KY	**W** 7–5	**Wolf (5–0)**	Ziemba (2–3)	Henzman (12)	814	32–6	16–4
April 23	Duke	#2	Jim Patterson Stadium • Louisville, KY	**W** 10–0	**Bennett (4–0)**	Day (3–3)	None	2,158	33–6	17–4
April 25	at Eastern Kentucky	#2	Turkey Hughes Field • Richmond, KY	**W** 14–4	**Smiddy (1–0)**	Carter (0–1)	None	894	34–6	17–4
April 26	Northern Kentucky	#2	Louisville Slugger Field • Louisville, KY	**W** 6–4	**Wolf (6–0)**	Jerger (1–3)	Henzman (13)	2,729	35–6	17–4
April 28	Toledo	#2	Jim Patterson Stadium • Louisville, KY	**W** 5–4	**McKay (6–3)**	Calhoun (3–3)	Bordner (2)	950	36–6	17–4
April 29	Toledo	#2	Jim Patterson Stadium • Louisville, KY	**W** 11–1	**McClure (5–1)**	Achter (3–4)	None	1,746	37–6	17–4
April 30	Toledo	#2	Jim Patterson Stadium • Louisville, KY	**W** 17–2	**Sparger (4–0)**	Shutes (2–6)	None	1,852	38–6	17–4

May

Date	Opponent	Rank	Site/stadium	Score	Win	Loss	Save	Attendance	Overall record	ACC Record
May 2	Miami (OH)	#2	Jim Patterson Stadium • Louisville, KY	**W** 6–5	**Henzman (2–0)**	Mraz (0–2)	None	1,734	39–6	17–4
May 5	at Notre Dame	#2	Frank Eck Stadium • South Bend, IN	**W** 2–0	**McKay (7–3)**	Bass (2–7)	Henzman (14)	517	40–6	18–4
May 6	at Notre Dame	#2	Frank Eck Stadium • South Bend, IN	**W** 5–1	**McClure (6–1)**	Hearne (3–4)	None	557	41–6	19–4
May 7	at Notre Dame	#2	Frank Eck Stadium • South Bend, IN	**W** 9–4	**Elliott (2–0)**	Guenther (2–1)	None	828	42–6	20–4
May 9	Vanderbilt	#2	Jim Patterson Stadium • Louisville, KY	**W** 6–2	**Martin (4–0)**	Ruppenthal (1–3)	None	4,120	43–6	20–4
May 12	Clemson	#2	Doug Kingsmore Stadium • Clemson, SC	**W** 4–2	**McKay (8–3)**	Barnes (5–4)	Henzman (15)	4,405	44–6	21–4
May 13	Clemson	#2	Doug Kingsmore Stadium • Clemson, SC	**W** 6–4	**McClure (7–1)**	Beasley (1–2)	Wolf (1)	5,164	45–6	22–4
May 14	Clemson	#2	Doug Kingsmore Stadium • Clemson, SC	**W** 6–4	**Bennett (5–0)**	Krall (7–2)	Henzman (16)	4,572	46–6	23–4
May 16	Indiana	#2	Bart Kaufman Field • Bloomington, IN	**L** 3–4	Saalfrank (2–1)	**Martin (4–1)**	None	3,077	46–7	23–4
May 18	Florida State	#2	Jim Patterson Stadium • Louisville, KY	**L** 9–12	Voyles (4–0)	**Sparger (4–1)**	None	3,487	46–8	23–5
May 19	Florida State	#2	Jim Patterson Stadium • Louisville, KY	**L** 2–8	Holton (8–2)	**McClure (7–2)**	None	3,359	46–9	23–6
May 20	Florida State	#2	Jim Patterson Stadium • Louisville, KY	Postponed						

Postseason
ACC Tournament

Date	Opponent	Rank	Site/stadium	Score	Win	Loss	Save	Attendance	Overall record	ACC Record
May 25	Notre Dame	#4	Louisville Slugger Field • Louisville, KY	**W** 10–3	**McKay (9–3)**	Hearne (4–5)	None	6,945	47–9	23–6
May 26	Florida State	#4	Louisville Slugger Field • Louisville, KY	**L** 6–2	Holton (9–2)	**McClure (7–3)**	None	8,843	47–10	23–6

NCAA tournament Louisville Regional

Date	Opponent	Rank	Site/stadium	Score	Win	Loss	Save	Attendance	Overall record	ACC Record
June 2	Radford	#7	Louisville Slugger Field • Louisville, KY	**W** 11–6	**Bordner (2–0)**	Gerber (4–4)	None	3,763	48–10	23–6
June 3	Oklahoma	#7	Louisville Slugger Field • Louisville, KY	**W** 11–1	**Sparger (5–1)**	Irvin (6–3)	None	4,060	49–10	23–6
June 4	Xavier	#7	Louisville Slugger Field • Louisville, KY	**W** 8–7	**Henzman (3–0)**	Kirschner (4–3)	None	4,012	50–10	23–6

NCAA tournament Louisville Super Regional

Date	Opponent	Rank	Site/stadium	Score	Win	Loss	Save	Attendance	Overall record	ACC Record
June 9	Kentucky	#7	Louisville Slugger Field • Louisville, KY	**W** 5–2	**McClure (8–3)**	Thompson 8–3	None	6,235	51–10	–
June 10	Kentucky	#7	Louisville Slugger Field • Louisville, KY	**W** 6–2	**McKay (10–3)**	Hjelle (11–4)	Bordner (3)	6,237	52–10	–

College World Series

Date	Opponent	Rank	Site/stadium	Score	Win	Loss	Save	Attendance	Overall record	ACC Record
June 17 or 18	Texas A&M	#7	TD Ameritrade Park Omaha • Omaha, NE	**W** 8–4	**McKay (11–3)**	Martin (7–4)	None	23,437	53–10	–
June 20	Florida	#7	TD Ameritrade Park Omaha • Omaha, NE	**L** 1–5	Singer (8–5)	**McClure (8–4)**	None	22,222	53–11	–
June 22	TCU	#7	TD Ameritrade Park Omaha • Omaha, NE	**L** 3–4	Wymer (6–4)	**Bennett (5–1)**	–	24,985	53–12	–

== Awards and honors ==
=== National / Conference Players of the Week ===
Awards
Player	Award	Date awarded	Ref.
Brendan McKay	Preseason National Player of the Year	December 19, 2016	
Brendan McKay	National Player of the Month	March 7, 2017	
Brendan McKay	ACC Pitcher of the Week	March 13, 2017	
Brendan McKay	ACC Pitcher of the Week	March 20, 2017	
Brendan McKay	ACC Pitcher of the Week	April 17, 2017	
Brendan McKay	ACC Co-Player of the Week	May 1, 2017	
Brendan McKay	Collegiate Baseball; National Player of the Week	May 1, 2017	
Drew Ellis	Collegiate Baseball; National Player of the Week	May 1, 2017	
Drew Ellis	Collegiate Baseball; National Player of the Month	May 8, 2017	
Brendan McKay	ACC Pitcher of the Week	May 8, 2017	
Colby Fitch	ACC Co-Player of the Week	May 15, 2017	

=== Award Watch List ===
Player	Award	Date awarded	Ref.
Brendan McKay	USA Baseball Golden Spikes Award Midseason Watch List	April 12, 2017	
Lincoln Henzman	2017 National Collegiate Baseball Writers Association; Stopper of the Year Award Watch List	April 27, 2017	
Brendan McKay	Semifinalist – John Olerud Two-Way Player of the Year Award	May 12, 2017	
Brendan McKay	Semifinalist – National Pitcher of the Year Award	May 12, 2017	
Devin Hairston	Semifinalist – Brooks Wallace Award	May 12, 2017	

=== Awards ===
Player	Award	Date awarded	Ref.
Kade McClure	Perfect Game Preseason All-American	January 10, 2017	
Brendan McKay	Perfect Game Preseason All-American	January 10, 2017	
Brendan McKay	Preseason First Team All-American	January 30, 2017	
Brendan McKay	NCBWA Preseason First Team All-Americans	January 31, 2017	
Kade McClure	NCBWA Preseason First Team All-Americans	January 31, 2017	
Devin Hairston	NCBWA Preseason Second Team All-Americans	January 31, 2017	
Brendan McKay	ACC Player of the Year	May 22, 2017	
Brendan McKay	First Team All-ACC – Designated Hitter / Utility	May 22, 2017	
Brendan McKay	First Team All-ACC – Starting Pitcher	May 22, 2017	
Devin Hairston	ACC Defensive Player of the Year	May 22, 2017	
Devin Hairston	Third Team All-ACC – Shortstop	May 22, 2017	
Drew Ellis	First Team All-ACC – Third Base	May 22, 2017	
Lincoln Henzman	First Team All-ACC – Relief Pitcher	May 22, 2017	
Colby Fitch	Second Team All-ACC – Catcher	May 22, 2017	
Kade McClure	Third Team All-ACC – Starting Pitcher	May 22, 2017	
Nick Bennett	Third Team All-ACC – Starting Pitcher	May 22, 2017	
Nick Bennett	Freshman All-ACC – Starting Pitcher	May 22, 2017	

=== Coaching awards ===
Player	Award	Date awarded	Ref.
Dan McDonnell	ACC Coach of the Year	May 22, 2017	
