= 2017 Wake Forest Demon Deacons baseball team =

American college baseball season

2017 Wake Forest Demon Deacons baseball

NCAA tournament, Gainesville Super Regional
- Conference: Atlantic Coast Conference

Ranking
- Coaches: No. 11
- CB: No. 13
- Record: 42–18 (19–11 ACC)
- Head coach: Tom Walter (8th season)
- Assistant coaches: Bill Cilento (8th season); Matt Hobbs (3rd season); Joey Hammond (3rd season); Eric Niesen (1st season)
- Home stadium: Gene Hooks Field at Wake Forest Baseball Park

2017 Atlantic Coast Conference baseball standings
	Conf.				Overall
Team	W		L	PCT	W		L	PCT
Atlantic
No. 5 Louisville ^{x}‍‍‍^{y}	23	–	6	.793	53	–	12	.815
No. 12 Wake Forest ‍‍‍^{y}	19	–	11	.633	43	–	20	.683
No. 25 Clemson ‍‍‍^{y}	17	–	13	.567	42	–	21	.667
No. 30 NC State ‍‍‍^{y}	16	–	14	.533	36	–	25	.590
No. 6 Florida State ‍‍‡‍^{y}	14	–	14	.500	46	–	23	.667
Boston College ‍‍‍	11	–	19	.367	25	–	28	.472
Notre Dame ‍‍‍	10	–	20	.333	26	–	32	.448
Coastal
No. 17 North Carolina ^{x}‍‍‍^{y}	23	–	7	.767	49	–	14	.778
No. 21 Virginia ‍‍‍^{y}	18	–	12	.600	43	–	16	.729
Miami (FL) ‍‍‍	16	–	13	.552	31	–	27	.534
Duke ‍‍‍	12	–	18	.400	30	–	28	.517
Georgia Tech ‍‍‍	11	–	19	.367	27	–	28	.491
Pittsburgh ‍‍‍	9	–	21	.300	23	–	30	.434
Virginia Tech ‍‍‍	9	–	21	.300	23	–	32	.418
x – Division champion ‡ – Tournament champion y – Invited to the NCAA tournament Rankings from Collegiate Baseball

The 2017 Wake Forest Demon Deacons baseball team represented Wake Forest University during the 2017 NCAA Division I baseball season. The Demon Deacons play their home games at Gene Hooks Field at Wake Forest Baseball Park as a member of the Atlantic Coast Conference. They were led by head coach Tom Walter in his 8th season at Wake Forest.

After a successful regular season record and conference record in ACC play the Demon Deacons secured a spot in the NCAA tournament as the eighth overall seed. Wake Forest advanced to the Super Regionals, where the Deacs would lose to the Florida Gators in Game 2 of the Gainesville Super Regional. Eight players from the team were selected in the 2017 MLB draft, setting a school record.
