= Brinly-Hardy Company =

American corporation

- Industry: Lawn Care Equipment
- Founded: Simpsonville, KY - 1839; 187 years ago
- Headquarters: Jeffersonville, Indiana
- Website: www.brinly.com

Brinly-Hardy Company is an American corporation located in Jeffersonville, Indiana. Brinly-Hardy designs, manufactures and sells lawn care products including aerators, carts, lawn vac systems, dethatchers, sweepers, broadcast spreaders, sprayers, and rollers; gardening equipment such as plows, disc harrows, and cultivators and landscaping products such as rear blades and box scrapers.

== History ==
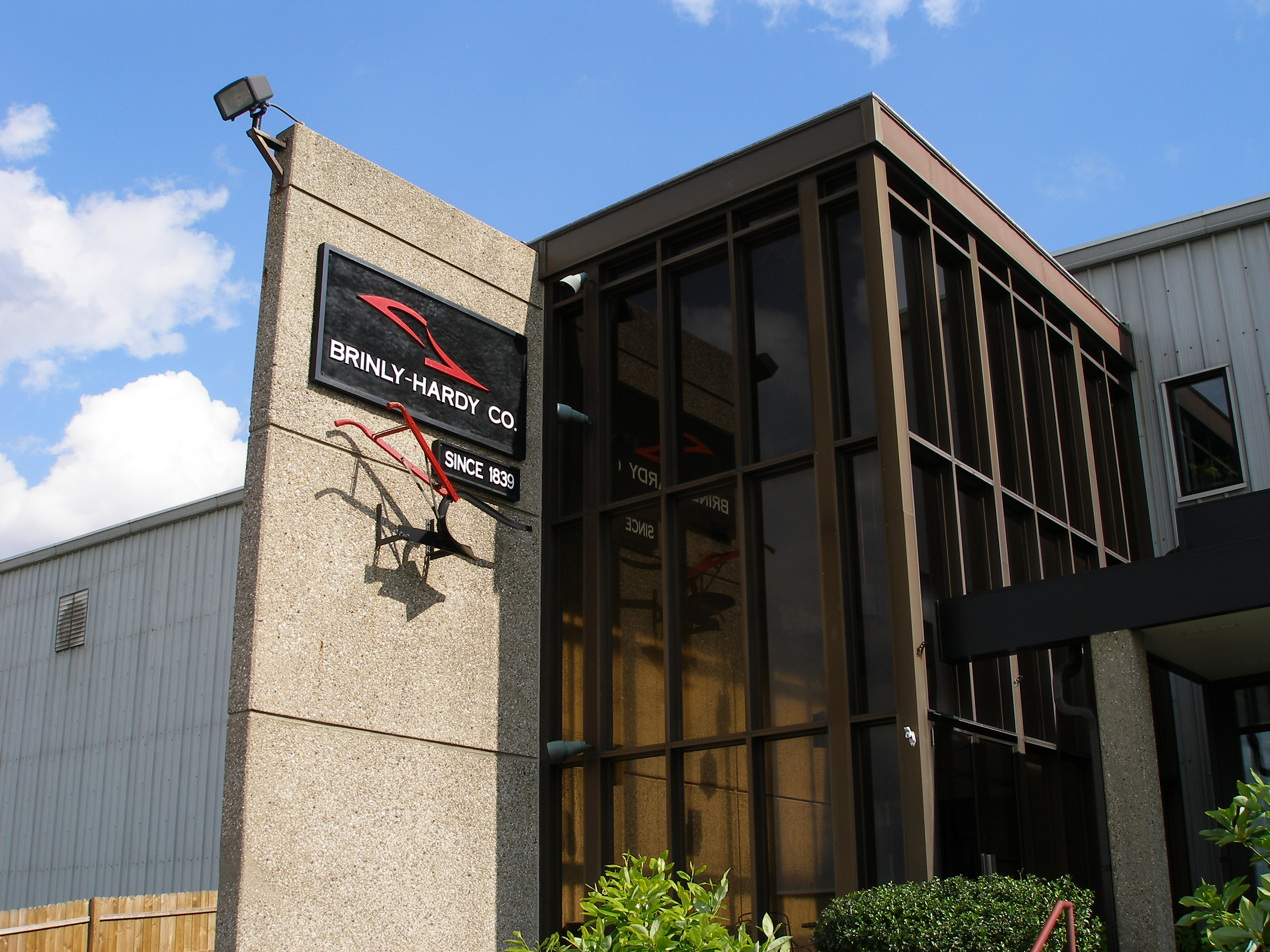
Brinly-Hardy Company Building

In 1800, John Brinly, a blacksmith in Simpsonville, Kentucky built and sold cast iron plows to Kentucky farmers. In 1837, his son Thomas Brinly, designed and built one of North America's first one-piece steel plows using a large saw blade. The new design largely replaced cast iron plows commonly used by farmers throughout the American South, forcing Brinly to open manufacturing centers in numerous Southern cities.

In 1859, Brinly moved the company headquarters to Louisville, Kentucky. And in 1863, he partnered with James Edward Hardy to create Brinly, Dodge and Hardy. During the American Civil War, federal troops destroyed several of Brinly's manufacturing and retail outlets throughout the South as he was a Confederate sympathizer. Rather than rebuild, the company consolidated in Louisville and grew its product line. In 1900, the name Brinly-Hardy Company was adopted. In 1902, Thomas Brinly died and James E. Hardy was named president.

== Current status ==
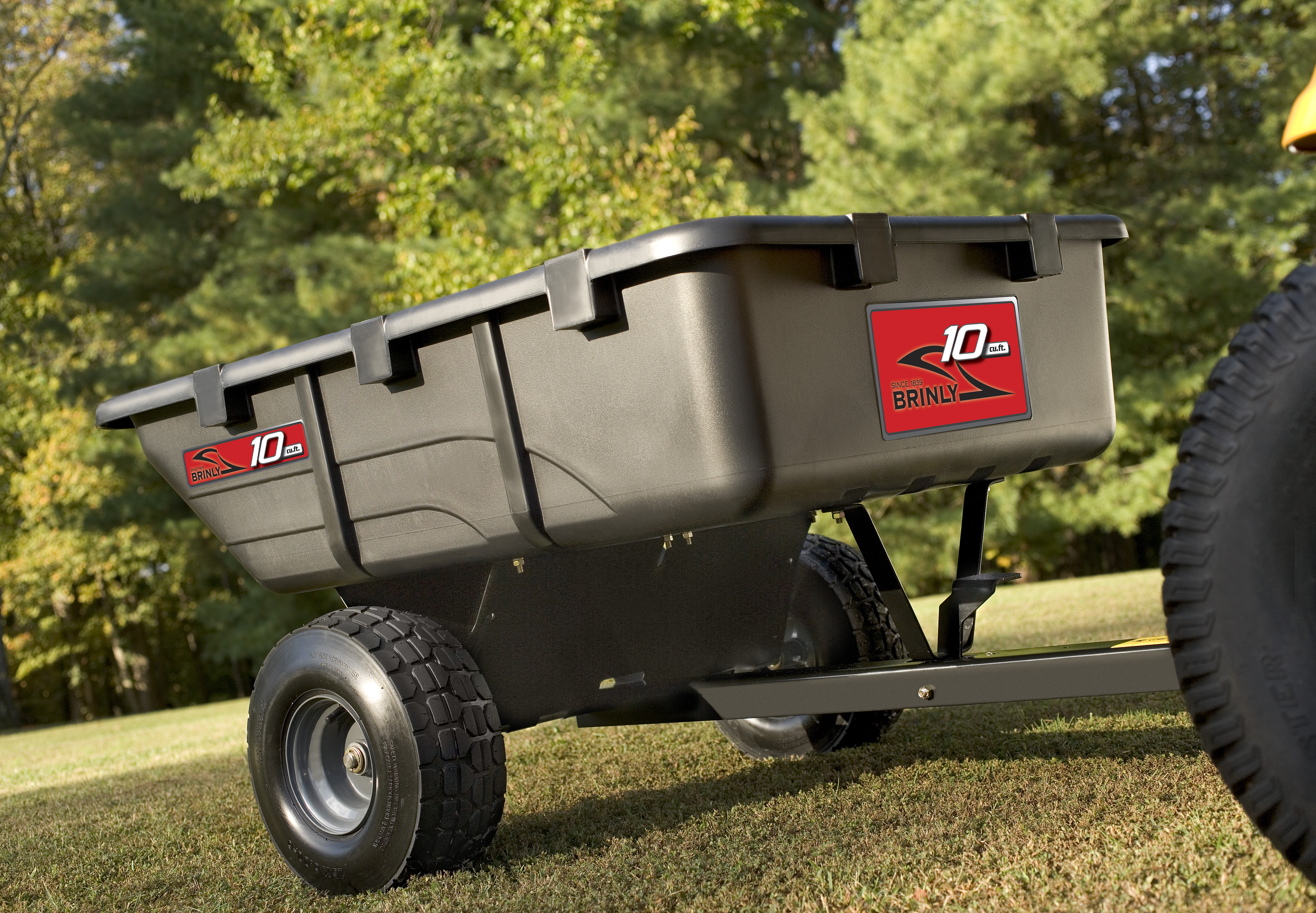
Brinly Poly Cart

Between 1980 and 1984, Brinly-Hardy shifted its current focus to manufacturing lawn care equipment. In 1996, James E. Hardy's great-great-granddaughter, Jane W. Hardy, became CEO of Brinly-Hardy Company. And in 1999, the company moved its facilities across the Ohio River to Jeffersonville, Indiana to make room for Louisville Slugger field. In August 2008, Brinly-Hardy acquired Spyker Spreaders, manufacturers of commercial-grade broadcast spreaders and outdoor power equipment.

Brinly-Hardy products are distributed and sold throughout the United States at local retailers and chain home improvement stores such as Home Depot as well as online retail outlets like Amazon.
