= Mike Martin Field at Dick Howser Stadium =

Baseball stadium at Florida State University

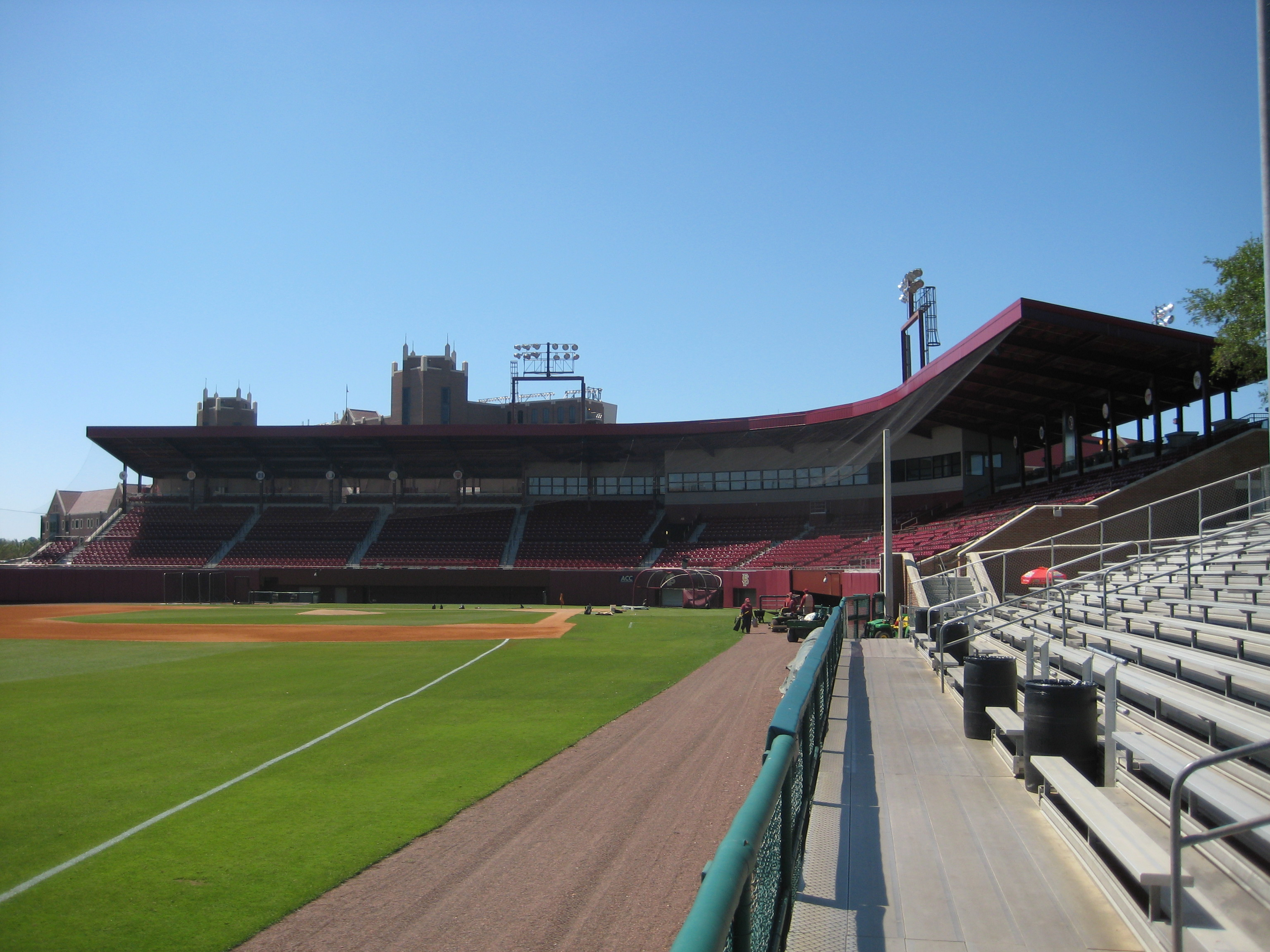
- Interactive map of Mike Martin Field at Dick Howser Stadium
- Former names: Seminole Stadium (1983–1988); Dick Howser Stadium (1988–2005)
- Location: Chieftain Way, Tallahassee, Florida, United States
- Coordinates: 30.440589°N 84.304064°W
- Owner: Florida State University
- Operator: Florida State Athletics
- Capacity: 6,700
- Surface: Natural grass
- Field size: Left Field - 340 ft Center Field - 400 ft Right Field - 320 ft Right Field Fence - 315 ft

Construction
- Opened: March 28, 1983
- Cost: $14 million (including renovation)

Tenant
- Florida State Seminoles baseball (NCAA)

Mike Martin Field at Dick Howser Stadium is a baseball venue located in Tallahassee, Florida, United States, located adjacent to Doak Campbell Stadium on the campus of Florida State University. It is the home field of the Florida State Seminoles baseball team of the NCAA Division I Atlantic Coast Conference. It opened in 1983 and was renovated in 2004. The two-year, $12 million renovation project expanded the seating capacity to 6,700.

== History ==
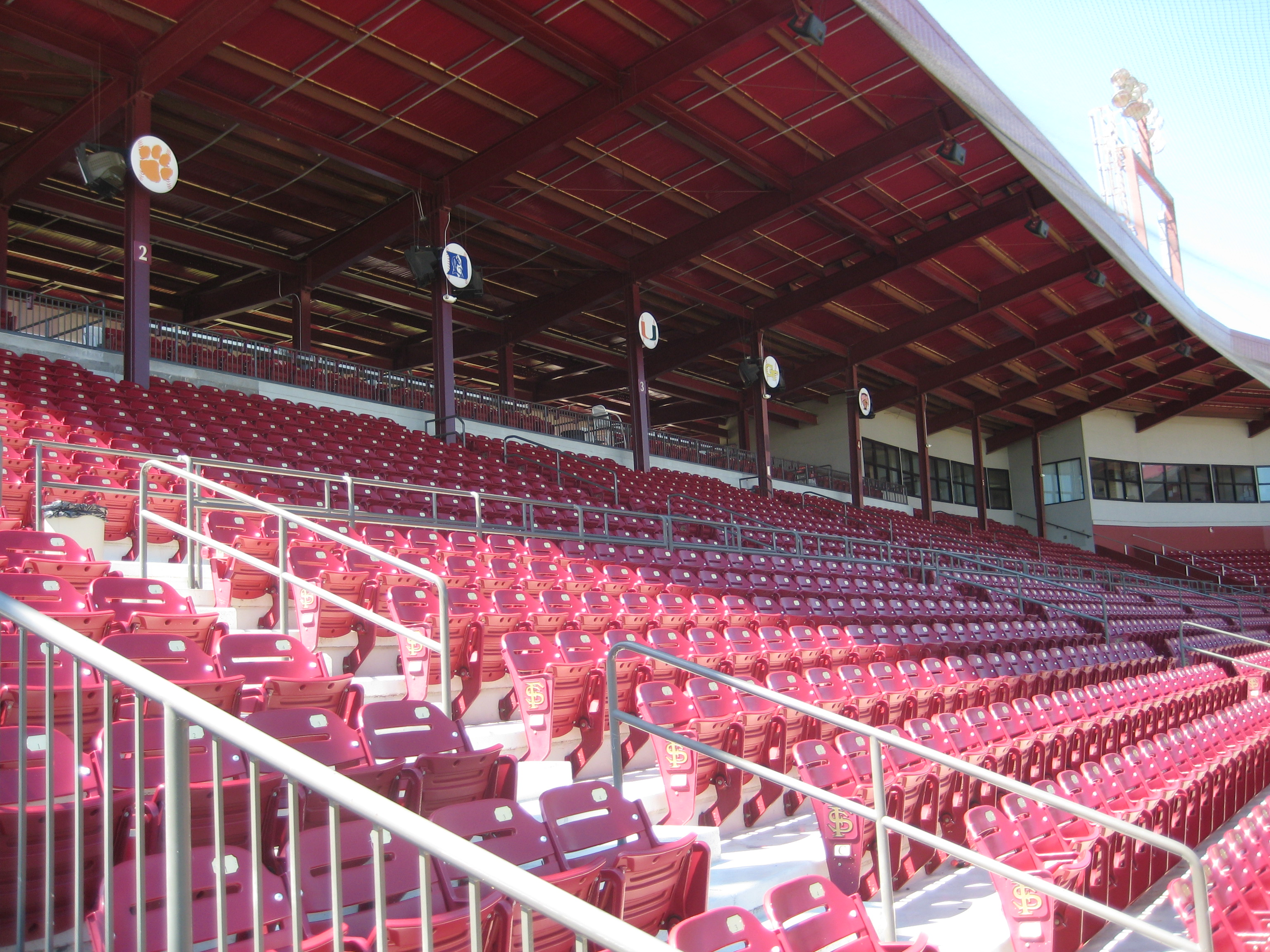
Grandstands

In 1988, the stadium portion of the venue was named after Florida State's first baseball All-American, Dick Howser, also a former head baseball coach of the program. The stadium was originally called Seminole Stadium. The stadium was dedicated in 1985 and commemorated by a game vs the New York Yankees. The light structures were donated by George Steinbrenner. The following season, the Kansas City Royals visited and the stadium was named. Howser managed both of the big league teams. In 2005, the field itself was dedicated to then-current Florida State head coach Mike Martin.

The stadium has played host to 37 NCAA Regional Tournaments since opening in 1983. In 2012, college baseball writer Eric Sorenson ranked the facility as the third best big game atmosphere in Division I baseball and, in 2014, the stadium was rated as one of the top 100 best stadium experiences across all sports in the United States and Canada.

== Mike Loynd Tradition Room ==
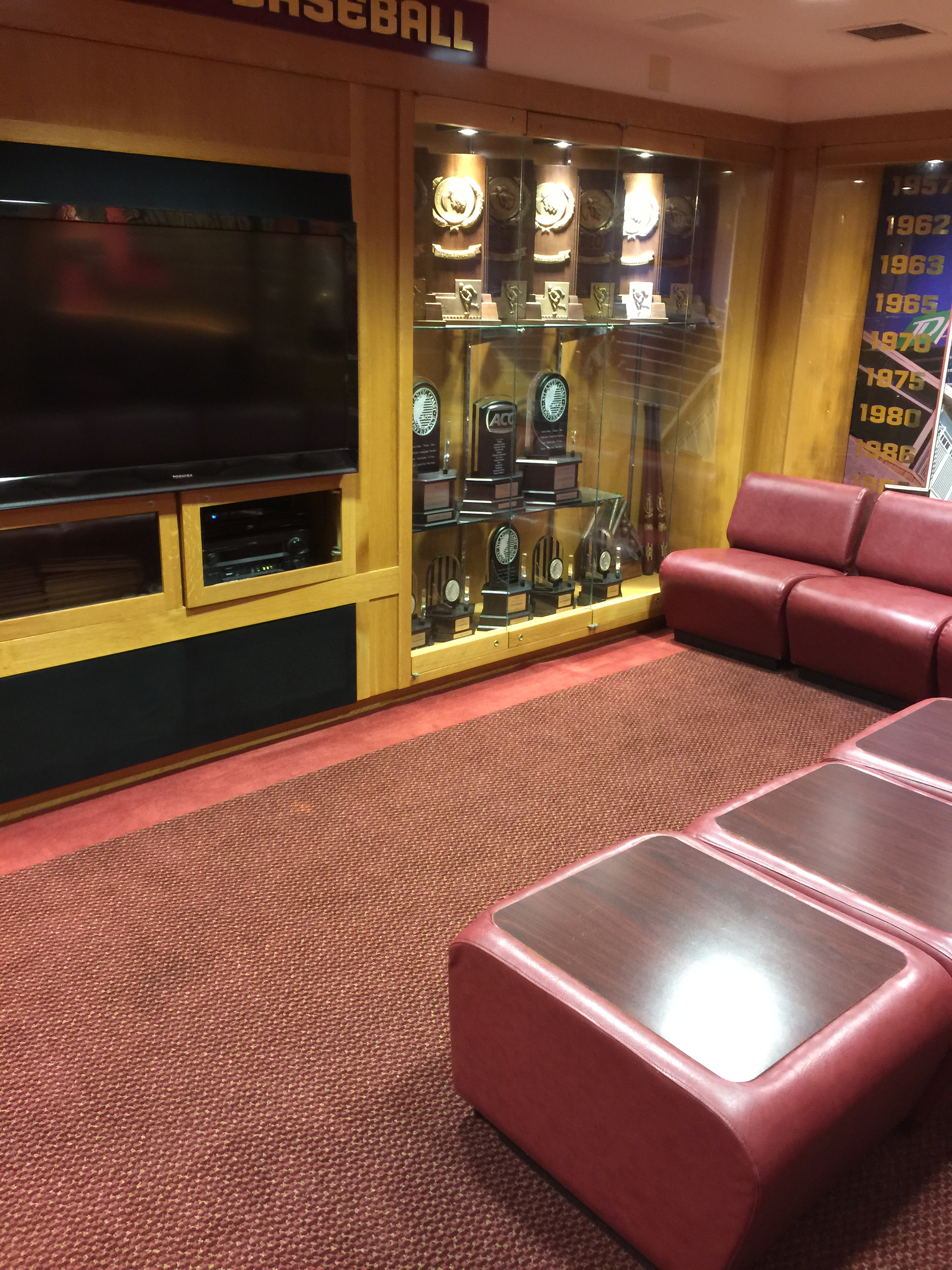

Florida State's baseball program has had many outstanding players and has enjoyed much success throughout the decades. To commemorate their storied baseball program, they have built a large tradition room to honor players, coaches, and the university program as a whole. The Mike Loynd Tradition Room is located next to the Griffin Family Clubhouse under the first base stands. The trophy room as stated above showcases the stories of the great players in Florida State baseball history telling of their stories and successes. The room holds awards, plaques, championships, and more. Inside of the tradition room is a lounge area with multiple televisions that continually broadcast historic moments that have occurred within the baseball program throughout the years. On the walls of the tradition room there are tributes to the Seminole teams that made twenty-one appearances to the College World Series, and appeared in seventeen conference championship games. In addition to team awards certain individuals were signaled out and awarded for their excellence. The individual awards are showcased in glass cases; they include the four Golden Spikes Awards (an award given to the best NCAA division one player in the country) won by, Mike Loynd, Mike Fuentes, J. D. Drew, and Buster Posey. Additionally other individual awards that are on display include the coveted Gold Glove Award, an award that honors the best defensive player in the country at their given position. Buster Posey most notably won both the Golden Spikes Award and the Golden Glove Award. He was the first Seminole baseball player to be presented with the award in only its second year of being given as an award.

The Mike Loynd Tradition Room was built as a part of the nearly $12 million, two-year renovation project that ended in 2004 giving rise to the Dick Howser Stadium we see today. The room was built in large part because of a generous donation by former Golden Spikes Award winner Mike Loynd.

== Section B Animals ==
The Section B Animals of Florida State Seminoles baseball is a tradition. Existing since 1977 the Animals are a group of Florida State baseball fans that come to the games and cheer on the Seminoles. Some old fans believe that they evolved out of a fan group that existed even before that time and was organized around supporting an individual player, a first baseman. That group carried a paddle with the player's picture on it and waved it during games. The name "Section B Animals" comes from 2 historical events. "Section B" refers to the original layout of the stands at Dick Howser Stadium that opened in 1983 at which they were assigned seats in Section B. Note that there is no Section B in the current configuration, the sections are numbered. The name "Animals" came about when an FSU sports fan named Sol would bring doughnuts to the games and offered them to fans. Sol saved money by buying day-old doughnuts, and one day the fans threw the stale doughnuts back at Sol, who explained "you are all just a bunch of animals," and the name stuck. The Animals consist of students, alumni, business people, families, public servants, and anyone else who has a passion for Florida State Baseball. The Animals use cheers and songs to pump up the crowd and intimidate the opposing team using humor and good cheer. They strategically serenade the opposition by choosing songs from their official 63-song “Animals of Section B” songbook. For instance, if an opposing team's pitcher is struggling they may sing "Take Me Out of the Ballgame," a parody of the famous baseball song. The Animals do unusual things like displaying the Canadian flag and singing "O Canada" in the bottom of the fifth inning. The Animals have been featured throughout multiple media outlets such as ESPN, Sports Illustrated, Sporting News, Seminole Uprising, The Mike Martin Show, WTXL-TV 27, WCTV, Bally Sports South, Tallahassee Democrat, The Florida Times-Union, FSView & Florida Flambeau, Last Word, The Gainesville Sun, Durham Herald Sun and Wakulla Digest. The Section B Animals have worked hard to establish a reputation of originality, positive energy, and being the No. 1 cheering section in college baseball. In recent years, the Animals website Section B Online, has begun generating hundreds of thousands of hits per month and is the premier source of information regarding Florida State Baseball on the Internet.

== Attendance ==
The stadium annually ranks among the top 10 nationally in attendance and set records in 2003 for total and average attendance.

=== Records ===
The single-game attendance record of 6,789 spectators was set on April 19, 2008, when Florida State defeated then-No. 1 Miami 9–5. During the week of April 14–20, 2008, 30,179 fans watched Florida State play a total of five games against intrastate competition, the (Florida Gators, North Florida Ospreys, and Miami Hurricanes). The series record is 19,157, set in 2024 against Miami.

The following is a list of the ten highest single-game attendance figures in the venue's history, as of the 2024 season.

No.	Opponent	Date	Attendance
1.	Miami	April 19, 2008	6,789
2.	Miami	April 18, 2008	6,756
3.	Florida	April 15, 2008	6,737
4.	Florida	April 10, 2012	6,730
5.	Florida	April 9, 2013	6,719
6.	Miami	April 15, 2006	6,715
7.	Florida	April 9, 2024	6,700
7.	Miami	April 14, 2006	6,700
9.	Miami	April 12, 2024	6,700
10.	Florida	April 14, 2015	6,634

== Pictures ==
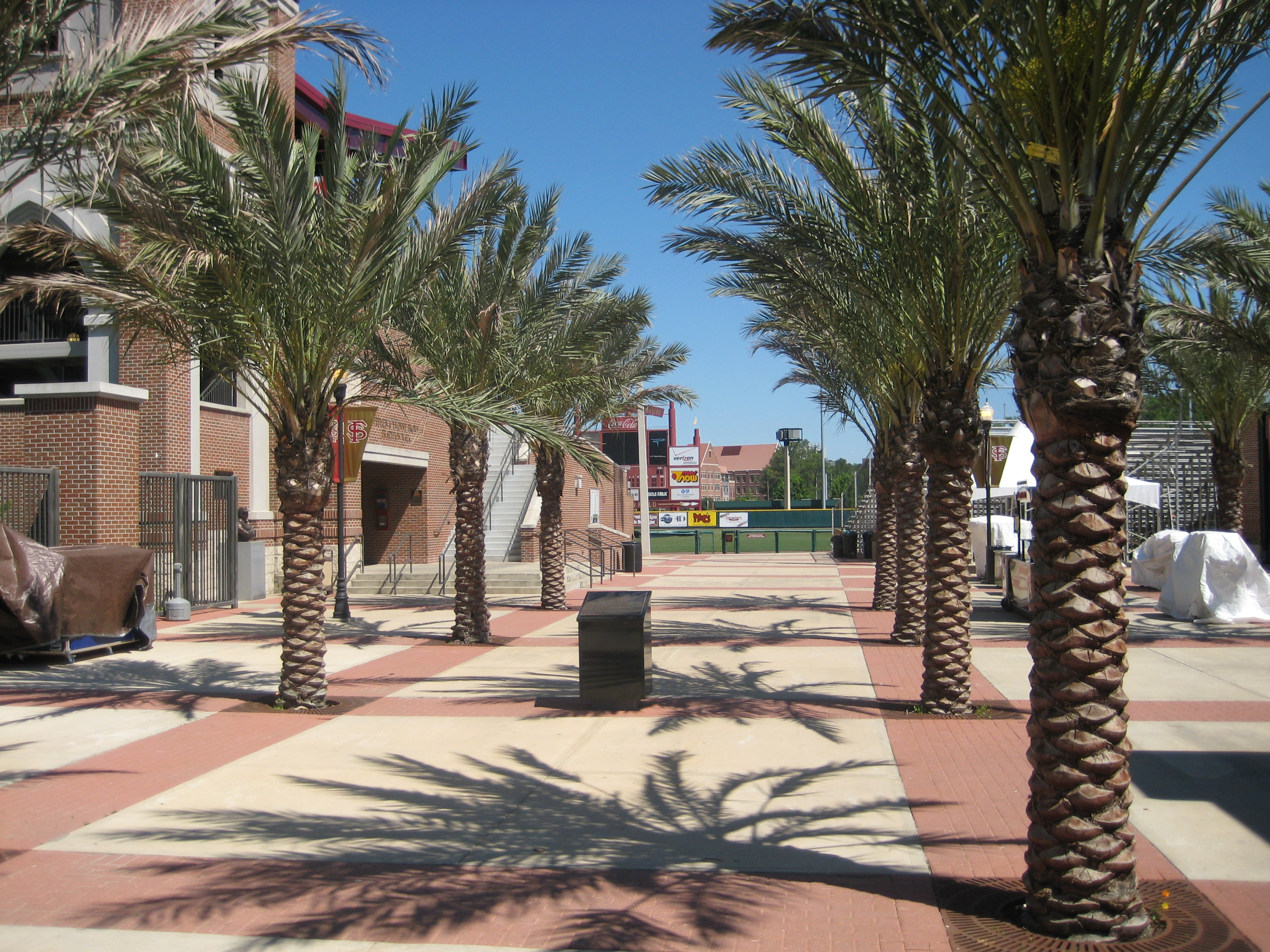
Andy and Carole Haggard Plaza at Dick Howser Stadium

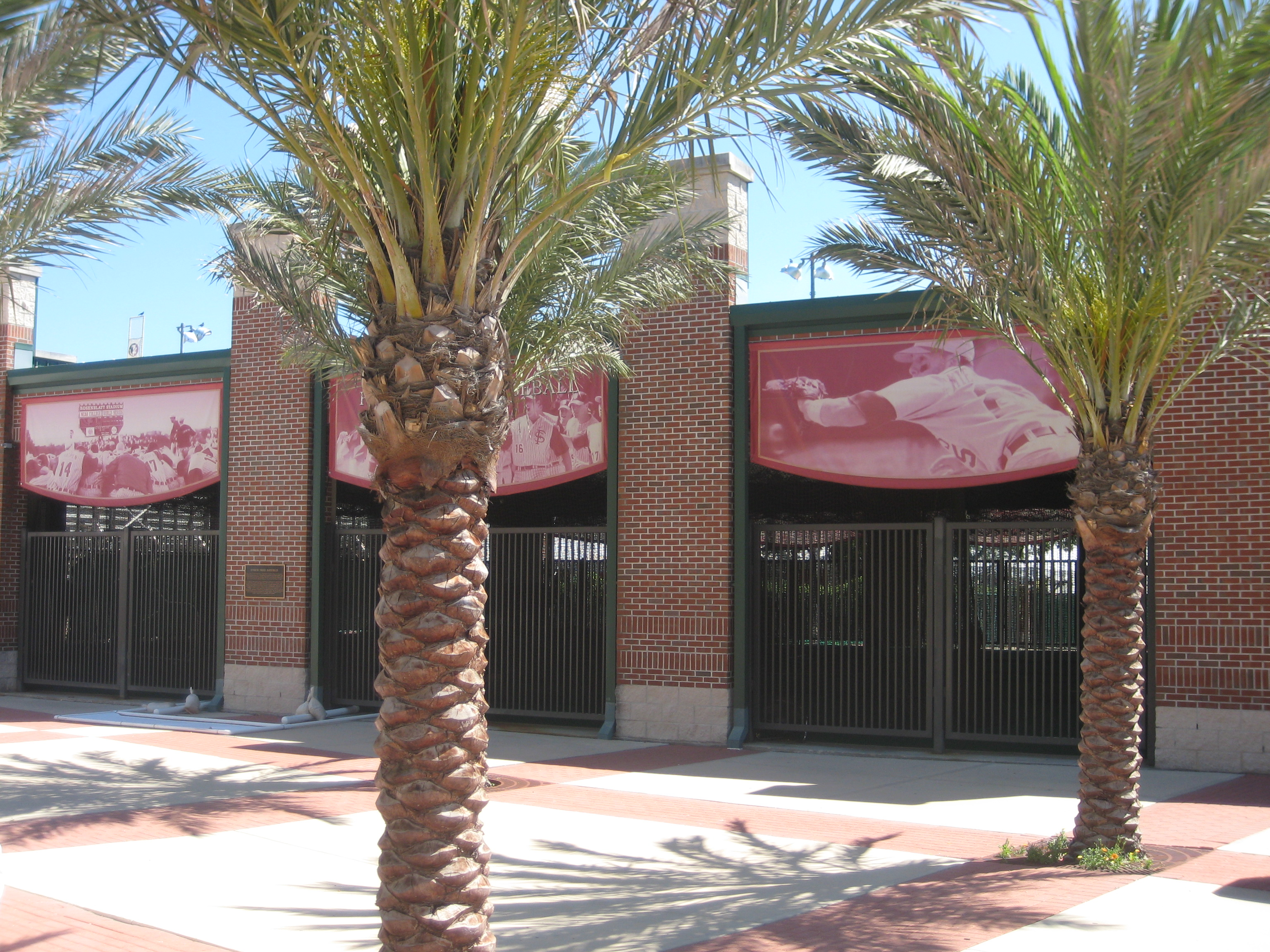
Batting cages

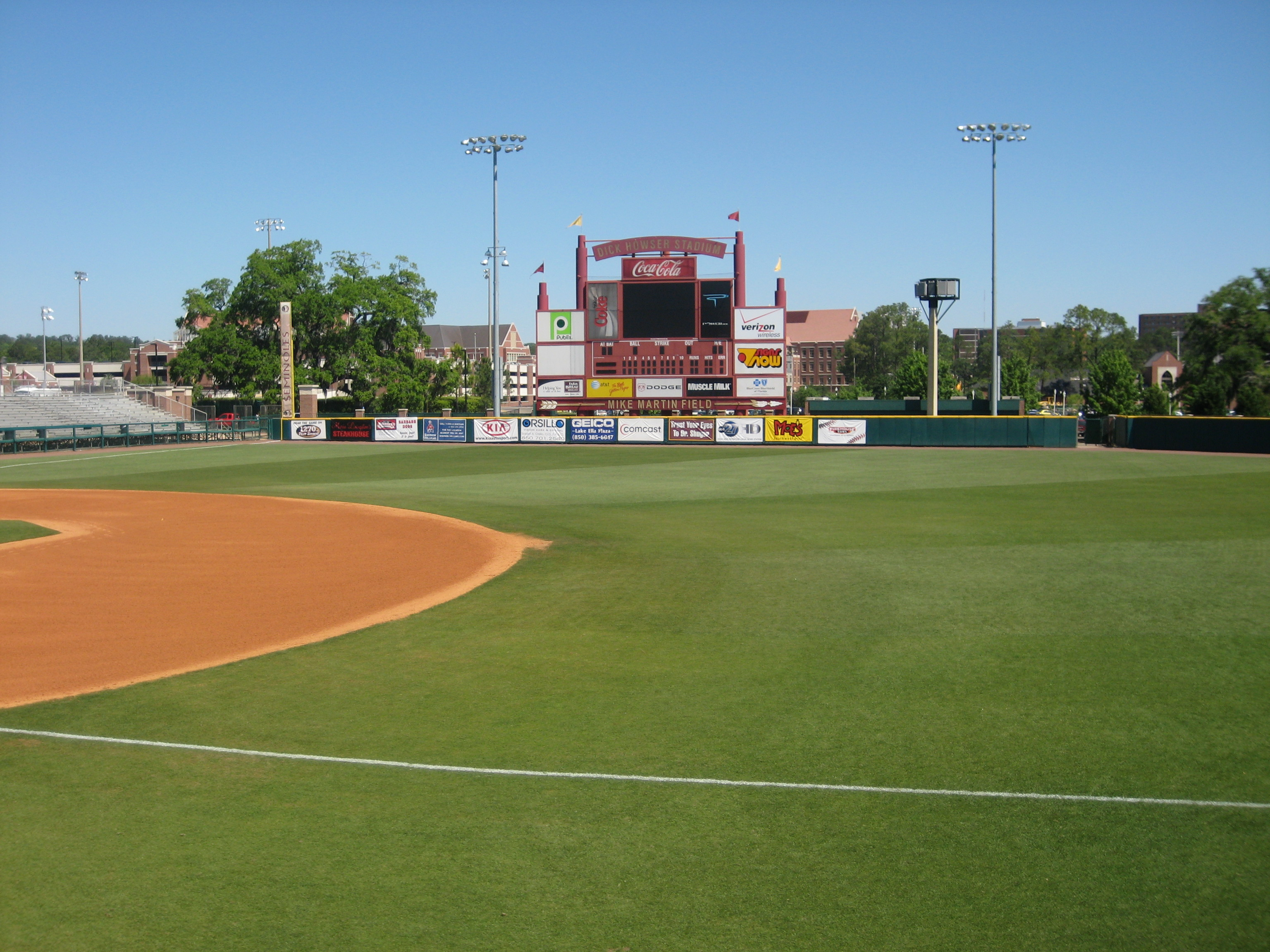
Field from the south stands

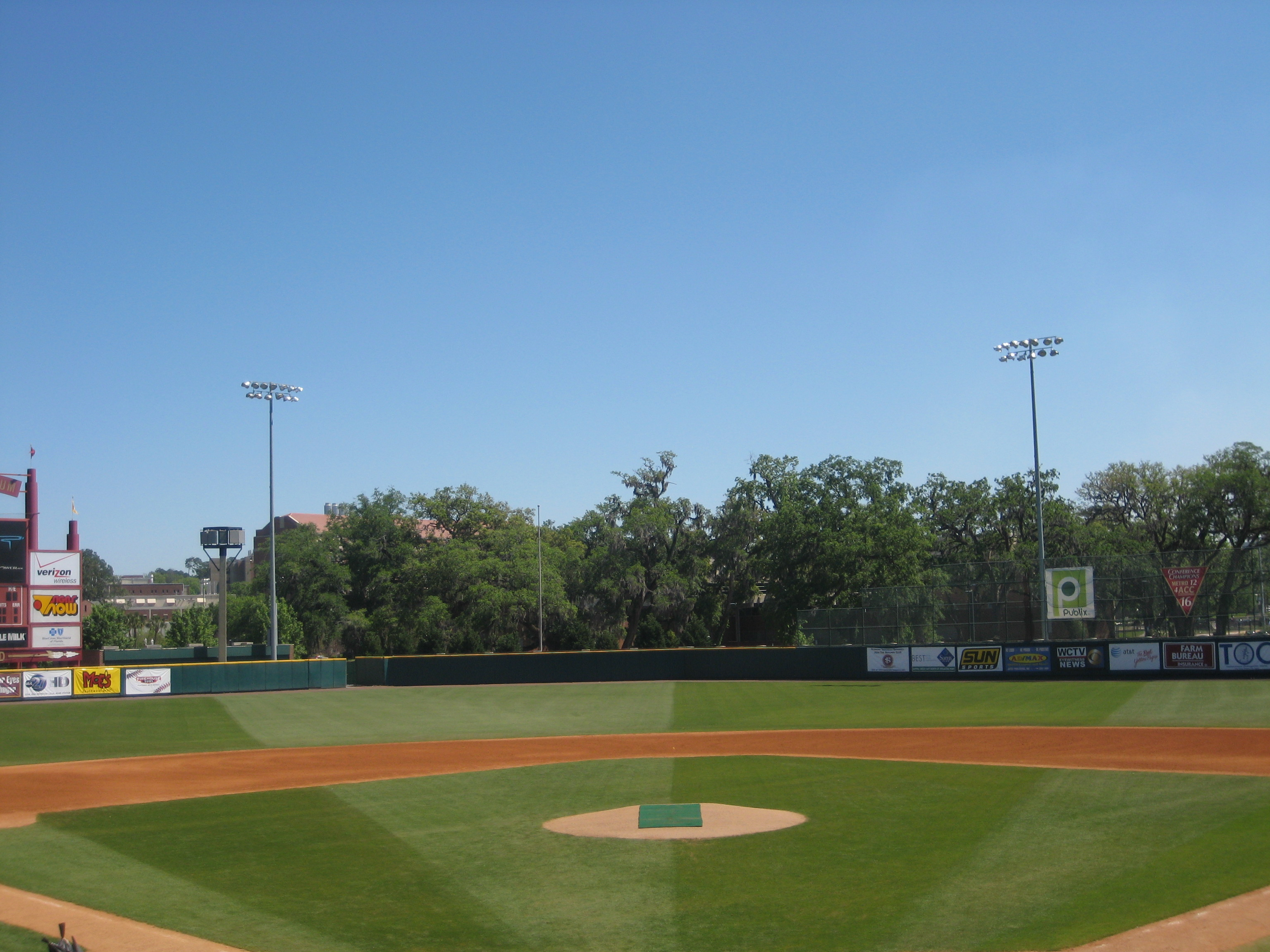
Mike Martin Field from behind home plate

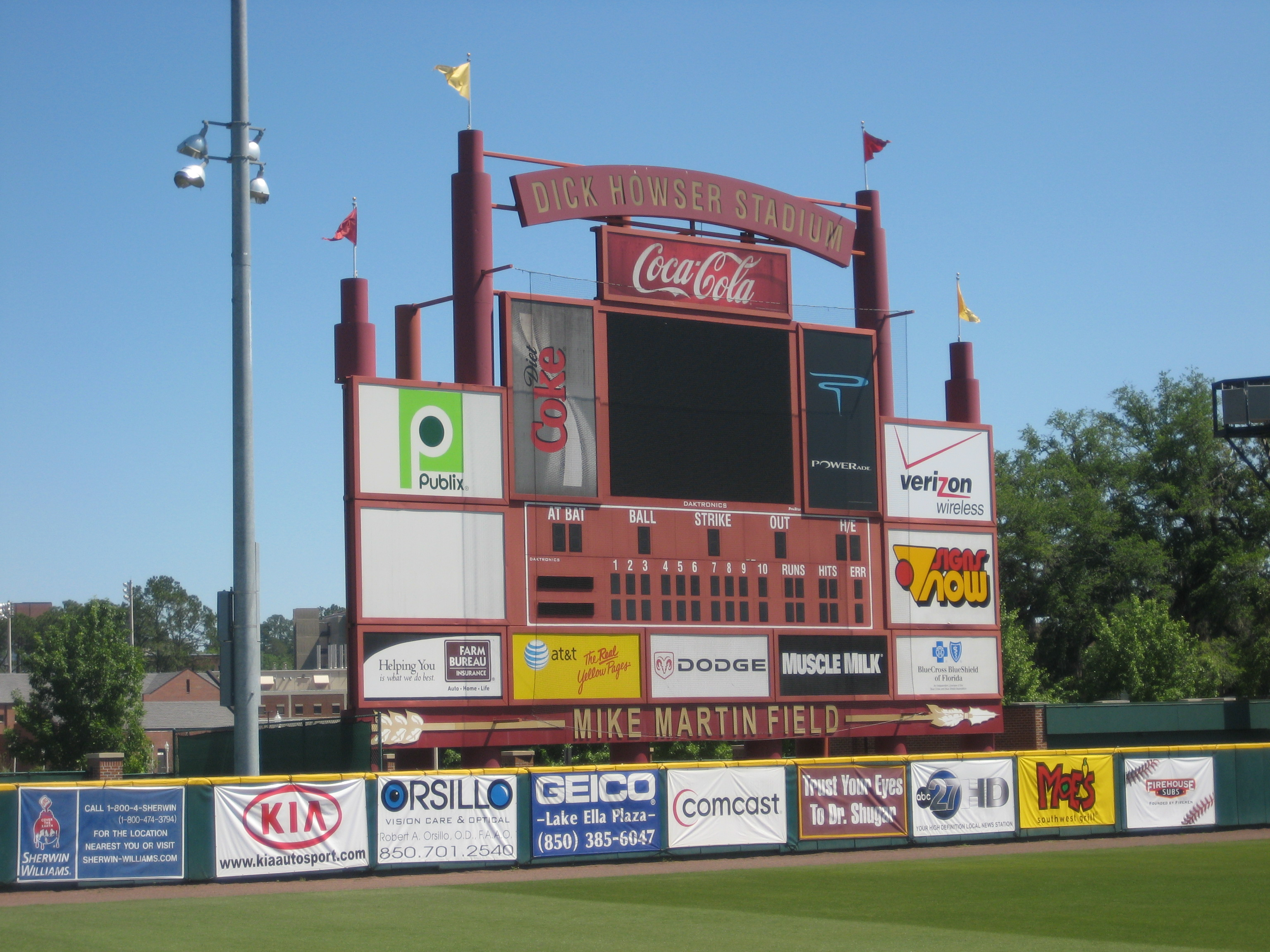
Scoreboard

== See also ==
- Florida State Seminoles
- List of NCAA Division I baseball venues
