= Jim Patterson Stadium =

Baseball park at the University of Louisville

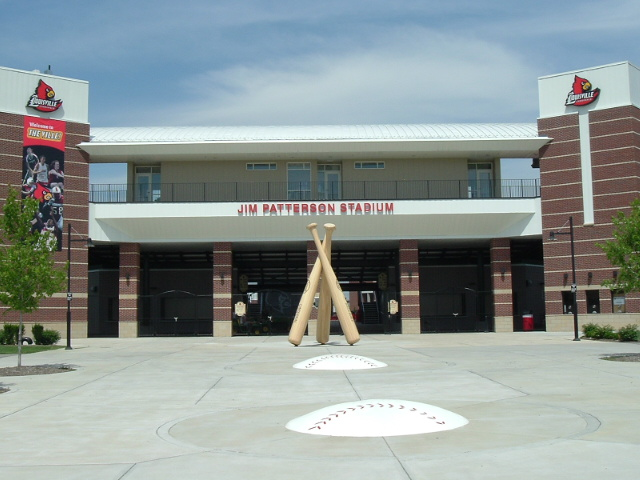
- Interactive map of Jim Patterson Stadium
- Location: Louisville, Kentucky
- Coordinates: 38.20524°N 85.76271°W
- Owner: University of Louisville
- Operator: University of Louisville
- Capacity: 6,000
- Surface: FieldTurf
- Record attendance: 6,237 (vs. Kentucky; June 10, 2017)
- Field size: Left Field - 330'; Left Center - 375'; Center Field - 402'; Right Center - 377'; Right Field - 330'

Construction
- Groundbreaking: August 2004
- Opened: April 2005
- Renovated: 2013
- Cost: $8,500,000 USD

Tenant
- Louisville Cardinals

Jim Patterson Stadium is a baseball stadium in Louisville, Kentucky. It is the home field of the University of Louisville Cardinals college baseball team. Since opening in 2005, Jim Patterson Stadium has hosted nine NCAA regionals and six NCAA Super Regionals.

In 2007, it hosted the NCAA Super Regionals for the first time in program history, where the Cardinals defeated Oklahoma State two games to one to advance to the College World Series in Omaha, Nebraska. It hosted an NCAA regional ever year from 2013 to 2017.

In 2016, the Cardinals ranked 27th among Division I baseball programs in attendance, averaging 2,606 per home game.

== History ==
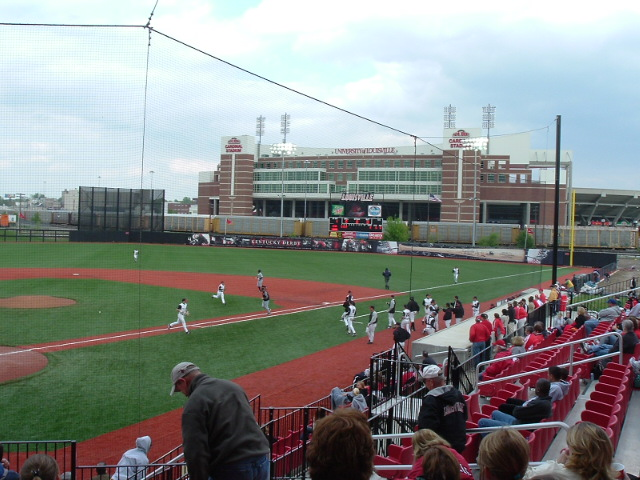
A game in 2005

The stadium was built on a former "brown field" site which had been abandoned for over 20 years. The site was split in half when Central Avenue was built through the area, with the original brick office building for the company remaining intact on the north side of the road and the remaining sections bulldozed. The office was refurbished and is now home to the Jewish Hospital Sports Medicine clinic, which was relocated from downtown. There is additional leasable space in the building which features the University of Louisville Family Medicine Clinic, a 24-hour non-emergency medical clinic that is featured by the university's student health insurance.

The project to build the stadium was simultaneous with the redevelopment of the southern half of the property on the other side of Central Avenue into a 130,000-square-foot (12,000 m^{2}) shopping center, with a UofL themed Kroger store as its anchor. All of the site is owned by Faulkner Hinton & Associates, including the stadium itself. UofL currently holds a 99-year lease on the stadium site.

At its opening, the stadium had 1,500 chairback seats, with several knolls along the outfield wall which seat an additional 1,000 people. The stadium opened in 2005 and is named after former Louisville baseball player and founder of Long John Silver's and Rally's, Jim Patterson. Patterson donated $5 million of the complex's $10 million cost.

The stadium went through a renovation in 2013 that added another 1,500 chairback seats, which brought the total capacity to 4,000. As part of the renovations, terraces were added behind the seating areas, and the press box and visiting locker rooms were improved.

Before the start of the 2023 season, upgrades were completed to the entryway and concourse of the stadium.

=== Attendance Records ===
The single-game attendance record of 6,237 spectators was set on June 10, 2017, when Louisville defeated Kentucky 6–2.

The following is a list of the ten highest single-game attendance figures in the venue's history, as of the 2024 season.

No.	Opponent	Date	Attendance	Event
1.	Kentucky	June 10, 2017	6,237	NCAA Super Regional
2.	Kentucky	June 9, 2017	6,235	NCAA Super Regional
3.	Kentucky	April 4, 2017	6,210	Regular Season
4.	Florida State	May 8, 2015	6,138	Regular Season
5.	Miami	June 7, 2025	6,066	NCAA Super Regional
6.	Miami	June 8, 2025	6,046	NCAA Super Regional
7.	Cal State Fullerton	June 8, 2015	6,010	NCAA Super Regional
8.	Kennesaw State	June 7, 2014	6,007	NCAA Super Regional
9.	Miami	June 6, 2025	5,776	NCAA Super Regional
10.	Kennesaw State	June 6, 2014	5,351	NCAA Super Regional

== Pictures ==
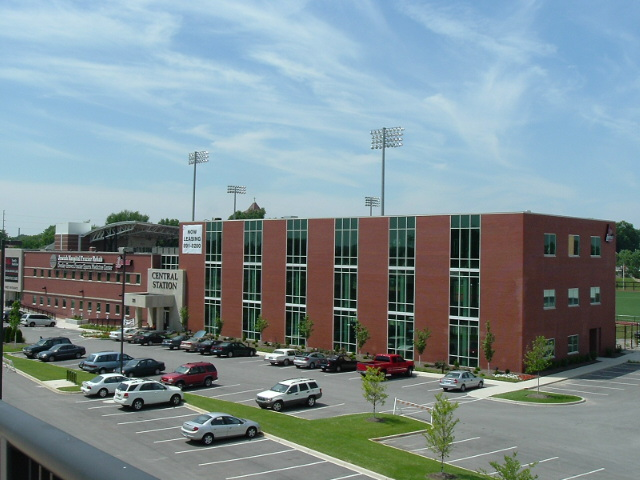
Jewish Hospital's "L" Care Sports Medicine Center at Patterson Stadium

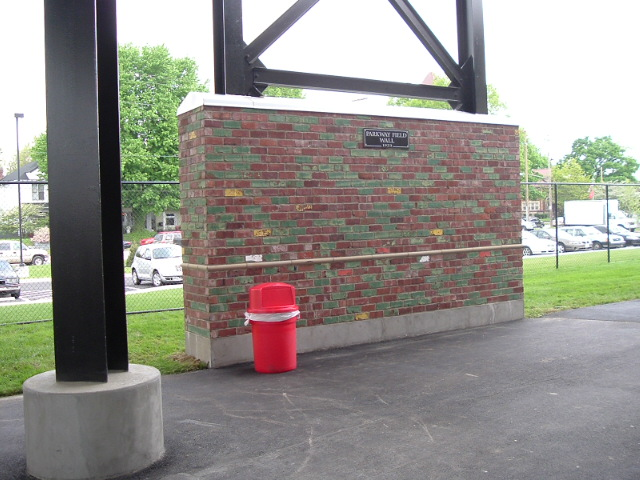
The beams of Patterson Stadium are made of brick from historic Parkway Field

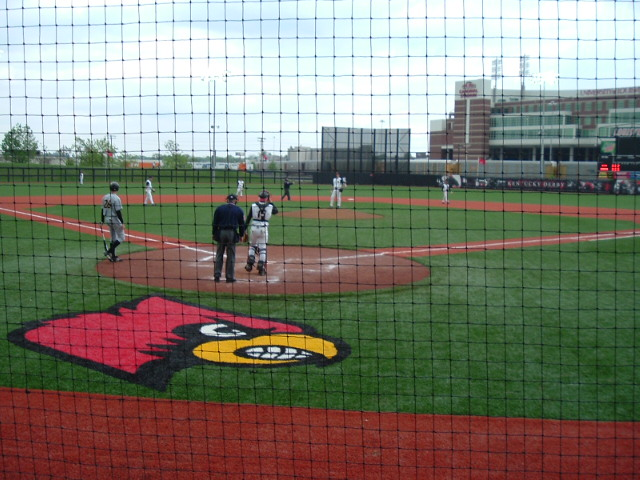
Patterson Stadium's batter's box, viewed from behind the protective netting

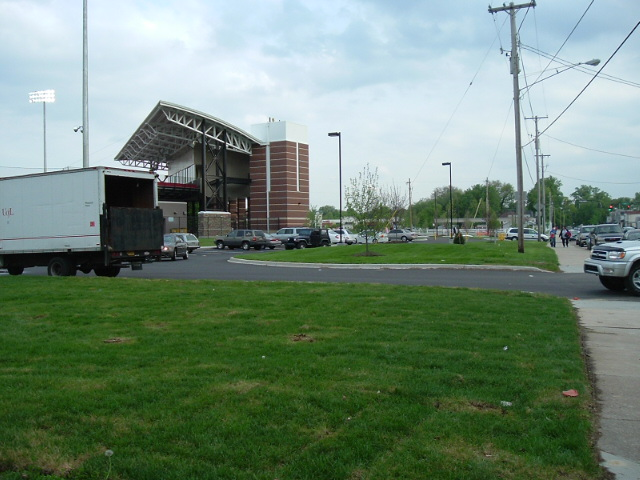
Patterson Stadium viewed from 3rd Street

== See also ==
- List of NCAA Division I baseball venues
- List of attractions and events in the Louisville metropolitan area
