= Mike Martin (baseball coach) =

American college baseball coach (1944–2024)

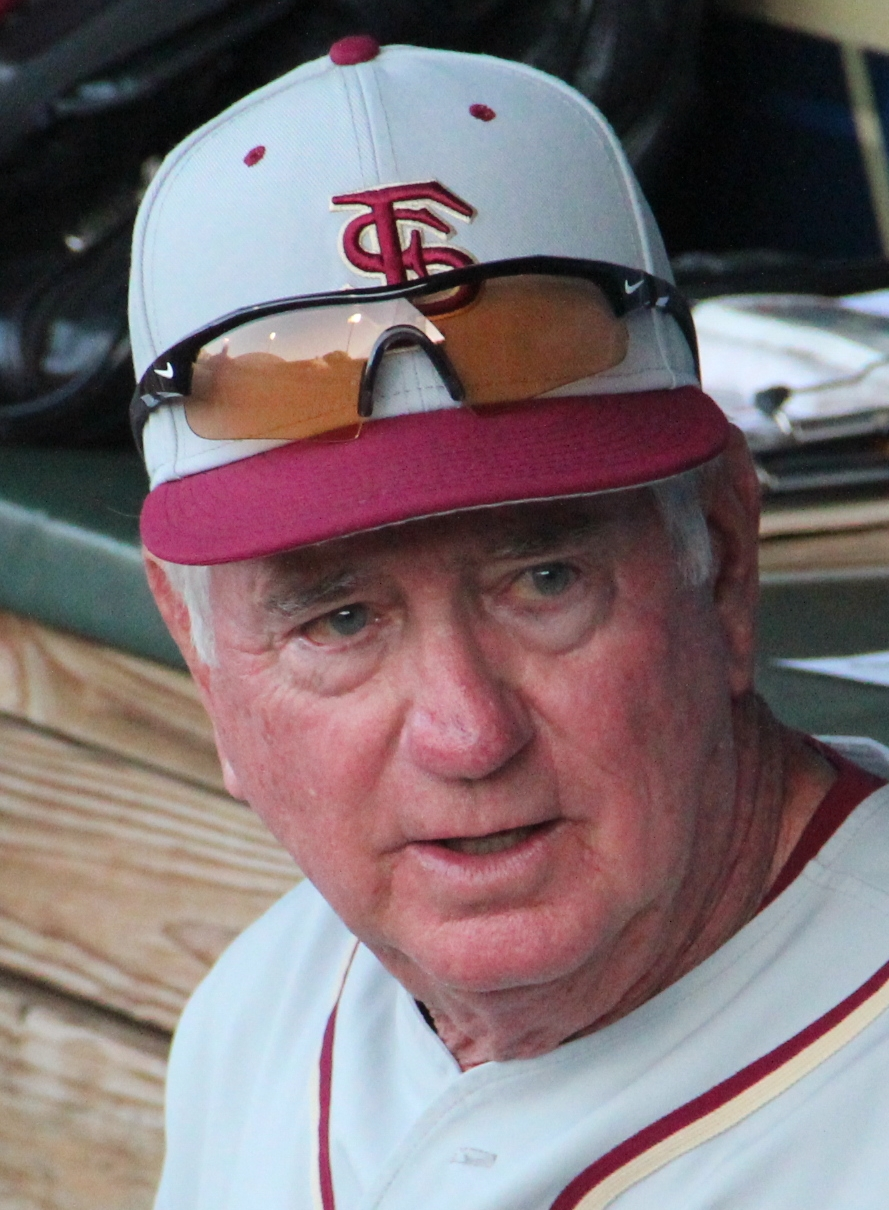
- Martin in 2014

Biographical details
- Born: February 12, 1944; Charlotte, North Carolina, U.S.
- Died: February 1, 2024 (aged 79); Tallahassee, Florida, U.S.

Playing career
- 1963–1964: Wingate JC
- 1965–1966: Florida State
- 1966: Greenville Mets
- 1967: Winter Haven Mets
- 1967: Mankato Mets
- 1968: Rocky Mount Leafs
- Position: Centerfielder

Coaching career (HC unless noted)

Basketball
- 1970–1971: Tallahassee CC
- 1971–1974: Godby HS (FL)

Baseball
- 1975–1979: Florida State (assistant)
- 1980–2019: Florida State

Head coaching record
- Overall: 2029–736–4
- Tournaments: 142–83

Accomplishments and honors

Championships
- 11× Metro Tournament champions (1980, 1981, 1983–1991) 8× ACC Tournament champions (1995, 1997, 2002, 2004, 2010, 2015, 2017, 2018); 4× Metro Regular season champions (1986, 1989, 1990, 1991) 9× ACC Regular season champions (1996, 1998, 1999, 2001, 2002, 2003, 2007, 2009, 2012)

Awards
- 2× Baseball America Coach of the Year (2012, 2019) 6× Metro Conference Coach of the Year 7× ACC Coach of the Year (1996, 1998–1999, 2001, 2007, 2009, 2012)
- College Baseball Hall of Fame; Inducted in 2019

Michael David Martin Sr. (February 12, 1944 – February 1, 2024) was an American college baseball coach. He was known for his tenure as the head coach of the Florida State Seminoles baseball team. He holds the record for most wins in NCAA Division I baseball history. Upon the completion of his coaching career, Martin had compiled a record of 2,029 wins, 736 losses and four ties over 40 seasons.

== Biography ==
Michael David Martin Sr. was a native of Charlotte, North Carolina. He began his collegiate playing career at Wingate Junior College, where he was a Junior College All-American. He then transferred to Florida State, where he played from 1965 to 1966 and graduated in 1966. During his years as the center fielder at Florida State, Martin hit .354, and earned all-District honors in his senior season and played in the 1965 College World Series. After his college career was over, Martin played professional baseball in the New York Mets and Detroit Tigers minor league organizations for three seasons before beginning his career in coaching.

Martin began his career in coaching at the junior high school level. His first stint as a college coach, surprisingly, came in a different sport, basketball, when Martin became the head basketball coach at Tallahassee Community College during the 1970–1971 season.

It was in 1975, when Woody Woodward took over the head coaching job at Florida State, that Martin would be reunited with his alma mater. Martin served as an assistant coach under Woodward for four seasons, and then for another season under Dick Howser. Howser would get his chance to manage the New York Yankees and Martin stepped into the head coaching role at Florida State in 1980.

Though Martin's teams did not win a national title, his tenure at Florida State was marked with many honors and feats. Florida State, as of Martin's retirement in 2019, had made 43 straight postseason appearances (41 under Martin), at that time the longest active streak in the country. Martin's Seminoles won eight Atlantic Coast Conference tournament championships and appeared in 17 College World Series.

Martin's players, which include many college and professional standouts such as Deion Sanders, J. D. Drew, Doug Mientkiewicz, Stephen Drew, Paul Wilson, Lincoln R. "Link" Jarrett, and Buster Posey, have excelled as well. More than 70 of Martin's players have been named All-Americans, five have been named national player of the year, four have won the Golden Spikes Award, considered to be the most prestigious individual award in amateur baseball, and two - J.D. Drew and Posey - have won the Dick Howser Trophy, considered to be the equivalent of the Heisman Trophy for baseball. Martin won the ACC Coach of the Year award seven times (1996, 1998, 1999, 2001, 2007, 2009, 2012).

On May 5, 2018, Martin reached 1,976 career wins, surpassing legendary coach Augie Garrido to become NCAA Division I college baseball's all-time wins leader. On June 18, 2018, it was announced that Martin would retire following the 2019 season.

Florida State's baseball team plays on Mike Martin Field at Dick Howser Stadium, dedicated in 2005.

On March 9, 2019, Martin became the first coach to achieve 2,000 career wins with a 5–2 victory over Virginia Tech in the second game of a doubleheader. In 2019, Martin was inducted into the National College Baseball Hall of Fame.

Martin died from complications from Lewy body dementia in Tallahassee, Florida, on February 1, 2024, at the age of 79.

== Head coaching record ==
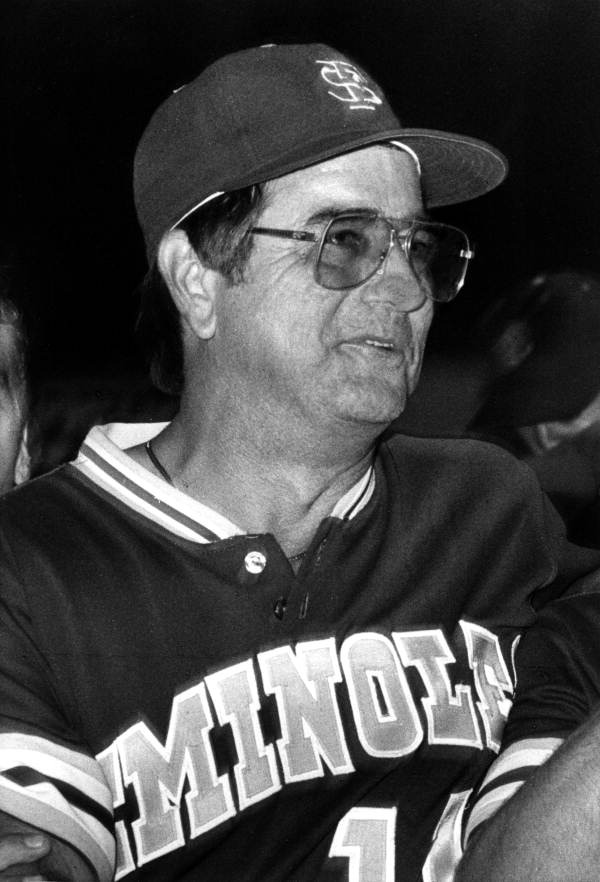
Mike Martin in 1986

Record table
Season	Team	Overall	Conference	Standing	Postseason
Florida State Seminoles (Metro Conference) (1980–1991)
1980	Florida State	51–12	5–2		College World Series
1981	Florida State	56–23	10–4		NCAA Regional
1982	Florida State	56–17–1	9–6		NCAA Regional
1983	Florida State	55–18–1	10–4		NCAA Regional
1984	Florida State	55–29	15–3		NCAA Regional
1985	Florida State	59–23	17–6	1st (Southern)	NCAA Regional
1986	Florida State	61–13	15–3	1st	College World Series Runner-Up
1987	Florida State	55–18	19–4		College World Series
1988	Florida State	50–18–1	17–6		NCAA Regional
1989	Florida State	54–18	14–4		College World Series
1990	Florida State	57–15	17–4		NCAA Regional
1991	Florida State	57–14	15–4		College World Series
Florida State (Metro):		666–218–3	163–50		
Florida State Seminoles (Atlantic Coast Conference) (1992–2019)
1992	Florida State	49–21	16–7	2nd	College World Series
1993	Florida State	46–19	14–9	3rd	NCAA Regional
1994	Florida State	53–22	14–9	4th	College World Series
1995	Florida State	53–16	16–7	2nd	College World Series
1996	Florida State	52–17	19–5	1st	College World Series
1997	Florida State	50–17	18–6	2nd	NCAA Regional
1998	Florida State	53–20	18–4	1st	College World Series
1999	Florida State	57–14	22–2	1st	College World Series Runner-Up
2000	Florida State	53–19	15–9	3rd	College World Series
2001	Florida State	47–19	20–4	1st	NCAA Super Regional
2002	Florida State	60–14	18–6	1st	NCAA Super Regional
2003	Florida State	54–13–1	19–5	1st	NCAA Super Regional
2004	Florida State	45–23	16–8	3rd	NCAA Super Regional
2005	Florida State	53–20	19–11	4th	NCAA Super Regional
2006	Florida State	44–21	16–13	6th (T–2nd Atlantic)	NCAA Regional
2007	Florida State	45–13	21–6	1st (1st Atlantic)	NCAA Regional
2008	Florida State	54–14	24–6	2nd (1st Atlantic)	College World Series
2009	Florida State	45–18	19–9	1st (1st Atlantic)	NCAA Super Regional
2010	Florida State	48–20	18–12	5th (T–1st Atlantic)	College World Series
2011	Florida State	46–19	19–11	5th (1st Atlantic)	NCAA Super Regional
2012	Florida State	50–17	24–6	1st (1st Atlantic)	College World Series
2013	Florida State	47–17	20–10	3rd (1st Atlantic)	NCAA Super Regional
2014	Florida State	43–17	21–9	3rd (1st Atlantic)	NCAA Regional
2015	Florida State	44–21	17–13	4th (2nd Atlantic)	NCAA Super Regional
2016	Florida State	41–22	16–10	4th (2nd Atlantic)	NCAA Super Regional
2017	Florida State	46–23	14–14	8th (5th Atlantic)	College World Series
2018	Florida State	43–19	16–13	T-6th (4th Atlantic)	NCAA Regional
2019	Florida State	42–23	17–13	T-5th(3rd Atlantic)	College World Series
Florida State (ACC):		1332–518–1	506–237		
Total:		2029–736–4			
National champion Postseason invitational champion Conference regular season champion Conference regular season and conference tournament champion Division regular season champion Division regular season and conference tournament champion Conference tournament champion

== See also ==
- List of college baseball career coaching wins leaders
