= Louisville Slugger Field =

Baseball stadium in Louisville, Kentucky

- Slugger Field
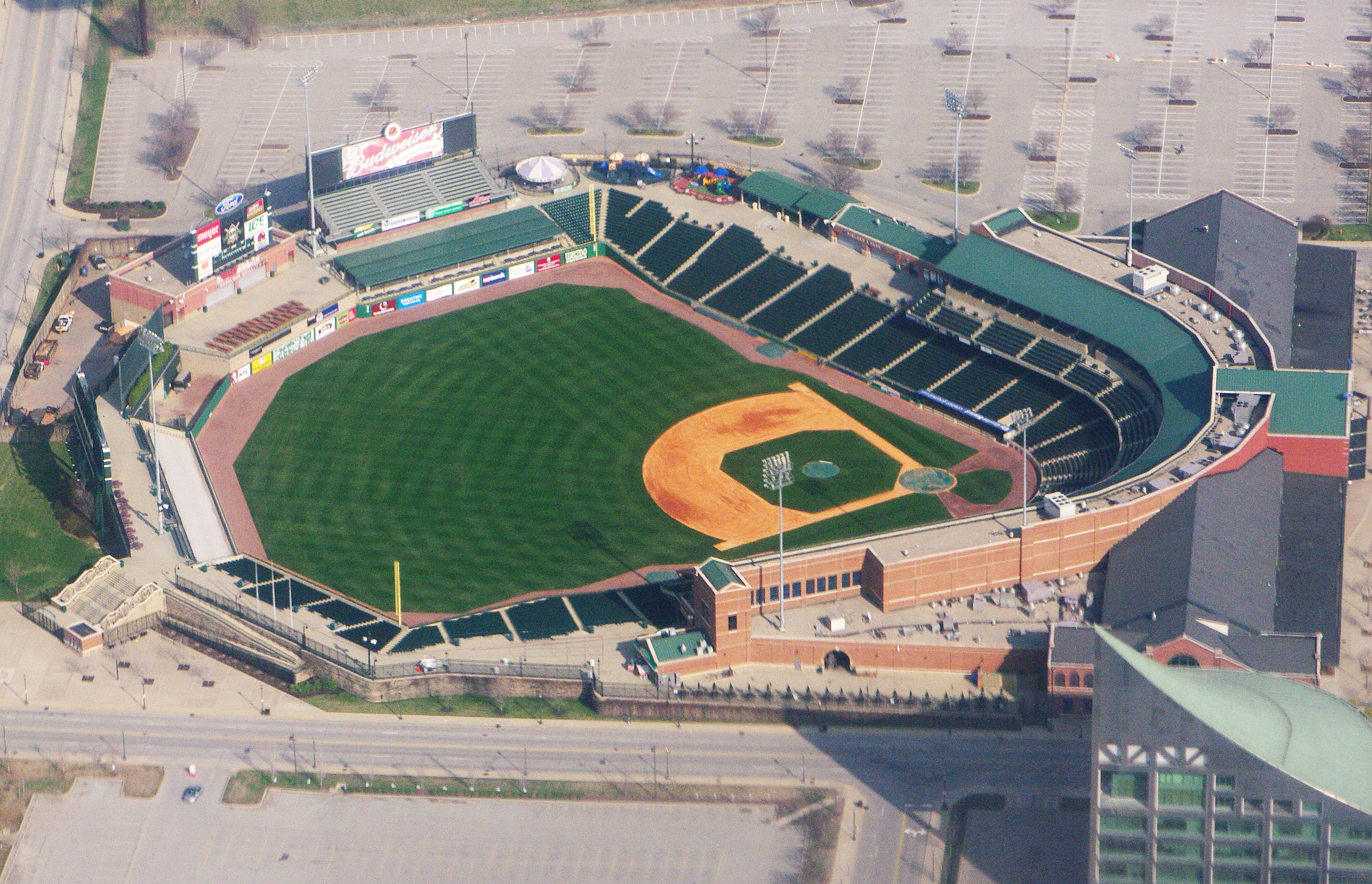
- Aerial view of Louisville Slugger Field, 2011

- Location within Kentucky Location within the United States
- Interactive map of Louisville Slugger Field
- Location: 401 East Main Street; Louisville, Kentucky; United States
- Coordinates: 38°15′22.27″N 85°44′40.75″W
- Owner: The Metro Development Authority; Louisville Baseball Club, Inc.
- Operator: Louisville Baseball Club, Inc.
- Capacity: 13,131 (baseball); 8,000 (soccer)
- Surface: 'Northbridge' Bermudagrass and HGT Kentucky Bluegrass
- Field size: Left field: 325 ft (99 m); Center field: 405 ft (123 m); Right field: 340 ft (100 m)

Construction
- Groundbreaking: November 13, 1998
- Opened: April 12, 2000
- Cost: $40 million ($74.8 million in 2025 dollars)
- Architects: HNTB; K. Norman Berry Associates
- Structural engineers: Rangaswamy & Associates
- Services engineer: CMTA Consulting Engineers
- General contractor: Turner/Barton Malow

Tenants
- Louisville Bats (IL/AAAE) 2000–present Louisville City FC (USLC) 2015–2019

Louisville Slugger Field is a baseball stadium in Louisville, Kentucky. The baseball-specific stadium opened in 2000 with a seating capacity of 13,131. It is currently home to the professional baseball team, the Louisville Bats, Triple-A affiliate of the Cincinnati Reds. From 2015 to 2019, it was also home to Louisville City FC, a professional soccer team in the USL Championship.

The unique design of Louisville Slugger Field includes a former train shed on the site which was incorporated into the stadium. The Ohio River and state of Indiana are visible from the park, as well as views of downtown Louisville. Naming rights for the stadium were purchased by Hillerich & Bradsby, makers of the famous Louisville Slugger baseball bat, and the Louisville Slugger Museum & Factory is located several blocks further down Main Street. The stadium is accessible from I-64, I-65, and I-71.

== History ==
The Louisville Bats and the City of Louisville broke ground on Louisville Slugger Field on November 13, 1998. In front of an estimated crowd of 1,000, Mayor Jerry Abramson and Governor Paul E. Patton cut out the first home plate before they broke the ground with Bats President Gary Ulmer and other officials.

The stadium hosted the 2008 Triple-A All-Star Game, in which the Pacific Coast League All-Stars defeated the International League All-Stars, 6–5, in front of a sellout crowd.

On July 8, 2009, John Mellencamp, Bob Dylan, and Willie Nelson held a concert at the ballpark.

In March 2015, Louisville City FC became the stadium's second major tenant. The team plays in the USL Championship (known before the 2019 season as the United Soccer League), which at the time occupied the third division of U.S. professional soccer but has now been elevated to second-division status. Louisville City left Slugger Field after the 2019 season, moving into the new Lynn Family Stadium several blocks to the east in Butchertown for the 2020 season.

On August 1, 2008, a record crowd of 18,543 people attended a concert by Dave Matthews Band.

== Features ==
The design of Louisville Slugger Field is a joint effort of HNTB Architects of Kansas City, Mo and K. Norman Berry Associates Architects of Louisville. The field was financed through a partnership between the city, the Bats, Hillerich & Bradsby, the Brown Foundation, Humana Inc. and the Humana Foundation.

The stadium includes 11,522 fixed seats, of which 92 are "On-Deck Club", meaning they have theater style padding, and are located in the first two rows of the sections behind home-plate. As well, there is room for 1,609 additional spectators in the picnic areas and berm sections. The ballpark also includes 32 private suites, 850 second-level club seats, a continuous concourse around the field, an outfield seating berm, extensive press facilities, concessions and restrooms, a children's play area, including a carousel, team and administrative offices and numerous retail amenities. Spectators enter the stadium through the restored "train shed" building, which was formerly the Brinly-Hardy Co. warehouse.

The Main Street side of the building includes exterior access to a microbrewery and restaurant located within the facility, as well as a statue of Louisville native and Baseball Hall of Famer Pee Wee Reese. The Witherspoon Street entrance, diagonally situated from Waterfront Park includes a statue of Pro Football Hall of Famer Paul Hornung.

While the full capacity of the park is 13,131, the capacity for soccer matches was normally restricted to 8,000 due to less-than-optimal sightlines for that sport.

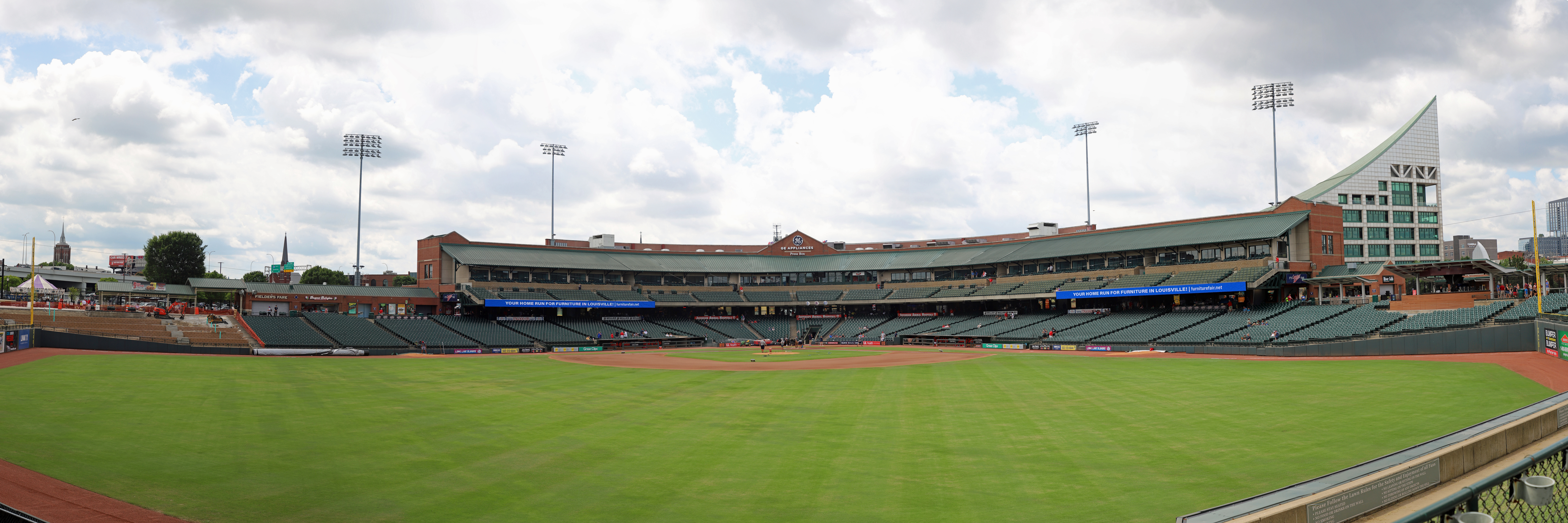
Panorama of Louisville Slugger Field in 2021

== See also ==
- Sports in Louisville, Kentucky
- List of attractions and events in the Louisville metropolitan area

Events and tenants
Preceded by Cardinal Stadium	Home of the Louisville Bats; 2000–present	Succeeded by current
Preceded by First stadium	Home of Louisville City FC; 2015–2019	Succeeded by Lynn Family Stadium
