= 2017 Cal State Fullerton Titans baseball team =

American college baseball season

2017 Cal State Fullerton Titans baseball

Stanford Regional Champion Long Beach Super Regional Champion

College World Series, 0–2
- Conference: Big West Conference

Ranking
- Coaches: No. 7
- CB: No. 7
- Record: 39–24 (15–9 Big West)
- Head coach: Rick Vanderhook (6th year)
- Assistant coach: Blake Hawksworth (1st year)
- Home stadium: Goodwin Field

2017 Big West Conference baseball standings
| | Conf. | | | | | | Overall |
| Team | W | | L | | T | PCT | W | | L | | T | PCT |
|---|---|---|---|---|---|---|---|---|---|---|---|---|
| No. 9 Long Beach State^{†}^{y} ‍‍‍ | 20 | – | 4 | – | 0 | .833 | 42 | – | 20 | – | 1 | .675 |
| Cal Poly ‍‍‍ | 16 | – | 8 | – | 0 | .667 | 28 | – | 28 | – | 0 | .500 |
| No. 7 Cal State Fullerton^{y} ‍‍‍ | 15 | – | 9 | – | 0 | .625 | 39 | – | 24 | – | 0 | .619 |
| Cal State Northridge ‍‍‍ | 12 | – | 12 | – | 0 | .500 | 26 | – | 29 | – | 0 | .473 |
| Hawaii ‍‍‍ | 10 | – | 14 | – | 0 | .417 | 28 | – | 23 | – | 0 | .549 |
| UC Davis ‍‍‍ | 10 | – | 14 | – | 0 | .417 | 21 | – | 30 | – | 0 | .412 |
| UC Irvine ‍‍‍ | 9 | – | 15 | – | 0 | .375 | 23 | – | 33 | – | 0 | .411 |
| UC Santa Barbara ‍‍‍ | 8 | – | 16 | – | 0 | .333 | 24 | – | 32 | – | 0 | .429 |
| UC Riverside ‍‍‍ | 8 | – | 16 | – | 0 | .333 | 22 | – | 32 | – | 0 | .407 |
† – Conference champion y – Invited to the NCAA tournament Rankings from Collegiate Baseball

The 2017 Cal State Fullerton Titans baseball team represented California State University, Fullerton in the 2017 NCAA Division I baseball season. The Titans played their home games at Goodwin Field and were members of the Big West Conference. The team was coached by Rick Vanderhook in his 6th season at Cal State Fullerton.

The Titans reached the College World Series for the 18th time in school history, where they were eliminated in two games.

== Roster ==
2017 Cal State Fullerton Titans roster
| Pitchers: 15 - Evan Larsen - Freshman; 17 - Colton Eastman - Sophomore; 18 - Brett Conine - Sophomore; 20 - Jimmy Endersby - Freshman; 25 - Erik Cha - (redshirt) Freshman; 26 - Connor Seabold - Junior; 30 - Jack Pabich - Junior; 34 - Joe Wills - Junior; 37 - Dillon Brown - Freshman; 38 - Josh Rios - (redshirt) Freshman; 42 - Gavin Velasquez - Sophomore; 43 - Maxwell Gibbs - Senior; 44 - John Gavin - Junior; 55 - Blake Workman - Sophomore | Infielders: 1 - Taylor Bryant - (redshirt) Junior; 2 - Tristan Hildebrandt - Junior; 9 - Hank LoForte - Sophomore; 12 - Sahid Valenzuela - Freshman; 13 - Timmy Richards - Senior; 19 - Dillon Persinger - Junior; 23 - Jake Pavletich - (redshirt) Sophomore; 35 - Zach Weller - Freshman; 39 - JT McLellan - Junior; 40 - Boston Romero - Junior; Catchers: 10 - Daniel Cope - Freshman; 24 - Chris Hudgins - Junior; 27 - Niko Pacheco - (redshirt) Junior | Outfielders: 3 - Chris Prescott - Junior; 4 - Ruben Cardenas - Sophomore; 6 - Scott Hurst - Junior; 31 - Zach Weisz - (redshirt) Freshman; 33 - Hunter Cullen - Senior; Utility: 8 - Coby Kauhaahaa - Sophomore |

== Schedule and results ==
Legend
| | Cal State Fullerton win |
| | Cal State Fullerton loss |
| | Postponement |
| **Bold** | Cal State Fullerton team member |

2017 Cal State Fullerton Titans baseball game log
Regular season

February
| Date | Opponent | Rank | Site/stadium | Score | Win | Loss | Save | Attendance | Overall record | Big West Record |
|---|---|---|---|---|---|---|---|---|---|---|
| Feb 16 | Stanford* | | Goodwin Field • Fullerton, CA | **W** 1–0 | **Seabold (1–0)** | Bubic (0–1) | **Eastman (1)** | 2,327 | 1–0 | |
| Feb 18 | Stanford* | | Goodwin Field • Fullerton, CA | **W** 8–1 | **Gavin (1–0)** | Hanewich (0–1) | None | 1,706 | 2–0 | |
| Feb 19 | Stanford* | | Goodwin Field • Fullerton, CA | **L** 6–7 | Hock (1–0) | **Brown (0–1)** | None | 1,703 | 2–1 | |
| Feb 22 | San Diego State* | | Goodwin Field • Fullerton, CA | **L** 4–5 | Petrovick (1–0) | **Gibbs (0–1)** | Saylor (1) | 1,345 | 2–2 | |
| Feb 24 | at UNLV* | | Earl Wilson Stadium • Paradise, NV | **L** 1–6 | Strong (2–0) | **Seabold (1–1)** | None | 966 | 2–3 | |
| Feb 25 | at UNLV* | | Earl Wilson Stadium • Paradise, NV | **W** 4–1 | **Veasquez (1–0)** | Lewis (0–1) | **Brown (1)** | 996 | 3–3 | |
| Feb 26 | at UNLV* | | Earl Wilson Stadium • Paradise, NV | **W** 5–0 | **Gavin (2–0)** | Poole (1–1) | None | 876 | 4–3 | |

March
| Date | Opponent | Rank | Site/stadium | Score | Win | Loss | Save | Attendance | Overall record | Big West Record |
|---|---|---|---|---|---|---|---|---|---|---|
| Mar 3 | at Houston* | | Schroeder Park • Houston, TX | **L** 4–7 | Romero (2–1) | **Seabold (1–2)** | None | 1,799 | 4–4 | |
| Mar 4 | at Houston* | | Schroeder Park • Houston, TX | **W** 4–1 | **Vesquez (2–0)** | Ullom (1–1) | None | 1,444 | 5–4 | |
| Mar 5 | at Houston* | | Schroeder Park • Houston, TX | Canceled | | | | | | |
| Mar 7 | at Arizona State* | | Phoenix Municipal Stadium • Phoenix, AZ | **W** 10–4 | **Workman (1–0)** | Ryan (1–1) | None | 2,176 | 6–4 | |
| Mar 8 | at Arizona State* | | Phoenix Municipal Stadium • Phoenix, AZ | **W** 13–4 | **Wills (1–0)** | Stadler (1–1) | None | 2,062 | 7–4 | |
| Mar 10 | Gonzaga* | | Goodwin Field • Fullerton, CA | **L** 0–1 | Morgan (2–1) | **Seabold (1–3)** | None | 1,430 | 7–5 | |
| Mar 11 | Gonzaga* | | Goodwin Field • Fullerton, CA | **W** 4–3 | **Cha (1–0)** | Hellinger (1–1) | **Conine (1)** | 1,773 | 8–5 | |
| Mar 12 | Gonzaga* | | Goodwin Field • Fullerton, CA | **W** 3–2 | **Workman (2–0)** | Lardner (1–1) | **Conine (2)** | 1,298 | 9–5 | |
| Mar 14 | San Jose State* | | Goodwin Field • Fullerton, CA | **W** 6–1 | **Wills (2–0)** | Cameron (1–2) | **Cha (1)** | 1,024 | 10–5 | |
| Mar 15 | Arizona* | | Goodwin Field • Fullerton, CA | **W** 4–0 | **Gibbs (1–1)** | Gomez (2–2) | None | 1,899 | 11–5 | |
| Mar 17 | New Mexico* | | Goodwin Field • Fullerton, CA | **W** 2–1 | **Seabold (2–3)** | Stevens (2–2) | **Conine (3)** | 1,526 | 12–5 | |
| Mar 18 | New Mexico* | | Goodwin Field • Fullerton, CA | **W** 5–4 | **Brown (1–1)** | Tripp (0–1) | **Conine (4)** | 2,607 | 13–5 | |
| Mar 19 | New Mexico* | | Goodwin Field • Fullerton, CA | **W** 1–0 | **Gavin (3–0)** | Gonzalez (1–2) | **Workman (1)** | 1,498 | 14–5 | |
| Mar 21 | at San Diego* | | Fowler Park • San Diego, CA | **W** 9–2 | **Wills (3–0)** | Sandum (1–2) | None | 416 | 15–5 | |
| Mar 24 | at Long Beach State* | | Blair Field • Long Beach, CA | **L** 4–6 | Riley (1–0) | **Cha (1–1)** | Advocate (2) | 2,319 | 15–6 | |
| Mar 25 | at Long Beach State* | | Blair Field • Long Beach, CA | **L** 5–8 | Sheaks (2–1) | **Gibbs (1–2)** | Rivera (3) | 2,392 | 15–7 | |
| Mar 26 | at Long Beach State* | | Blair Field • Long Beach, CA | **L** 0–1^{10} | Advocate (3–0) | **Workman (2–1)** | None | 2,640 | 15–8 | |
| Mar 28 | at UCLA* | | Jackie Robinson Stadium • Los Angeles, CA | **L** 7–9 | Garcia (2–0) | **Gibbs (1–3)** | Burke (1) | 555 | 15–9 | |
| Mar 31 | at UC Riverside | | Riverside Sports Complex • Riverside, CA | **L** 2–3 | Fagalde (5–0) | **Seabold (2–4)** | Morton (2) | 445 | 15–10 | 0–1 |

April
| Date | Opponent | Rank | Site/stadium | Score | Win | Loss | Save | Attendance | Overall record | Big West Record |
|---|---|---|---|---|---|---|---|---|---|---|
| Apr 1 | at UC Riverside | | Riverside Sports Complex • Riverside, CA | **W** 6–1 | **Velasquez (3–0)** | Lillie (0–3) | **Conine (5)** | 590 | 16–10 | 1–1 |
| Apr 2 | at UC Riverside | | Riverside Sports Complex • Riverside, CA | **W** 15–2 | **Workman (3–1)** | Delgado (0–1) | None | 563 | 17–10 | 2–1 |
| Apr 4 | San Diego | | Goodwin Field • Fullerton, CA | **W** 13–2 | **Wills (4–0)** | Crow (2–2) | None | 1,248 | 18–10 | |
| Apr 7 | UC Davis | | Goodwin Field • Fullerton, CA | **W** 6–0 | **Seabold (3–4)** | Garcia (1–2) | None | 1,798 | 19–10 | 3–1 |
| Apr 8 | UC Davis | | Goodwin Field • Fullerton, CA | **W** 9–8 | **Workman (4–1)** | Stone (3–2) | None | 1,893 | 20–10 | 4–1 |
| Apr 9 | UC Davis | | Goodwin Field • Fullerton, CA | **W** 8–5 | **Gavin (4–0)** | Loar (0–1) | **Conine (6)** | 1,517 | 21–10 | 5–1 |
| Apr 13 | at Southern California* | | Dedeaux Field • Los Angeles, CA | **L** 9–13 | Clarke (4–1) | **Pabich (0–1)** | None | 716 | 21–11 | |
| Apr 14 | Southern California* | | Goodwin Field • Fullerton, CA | **W** 13–5 | **Seabold (4–4)** | Stubbs (0–2) | None | 3,265 | 22–11 | |
| Apr 15 | Southern California* | | Goodwin Field • Fullerton, CA | **W** 2–1 | **Gavin (5–0)** | Crouse (2–5) | **Conine (7)** | 1,918 | 23–11 | |
| Apr 18 | vs. San Diego* | | Lake Elsinore Diamond • Lake Elsinore, CA | **L** 6–11 | Burdick (2–1) | **Wills (4–1)** | None | 407 | 23–12 | |
| Apr 21 | at Cal Poly | | Robin Baggett Stadium • San Luis Obispo, CA | **W** 7–4 | **Seabold (5–4)** | Uelmen (2–6) | **Conine (8)** | 1,798 | 24–12 | 6–1 |
| Apr 22 | at Cal Poly | | Robin Baggett Stadium • San Luis Obispo, CA | **L** 6–13 | Lee (4–2) | **Gavin (5–1)** | None | 2,850 | 24–13 | 6–2 |
| Apr 23 | at Cal Poly | | Robin Baggett Stadium • San Luis Obispo, CA | **L** 4–8 | Howard (3–1) | **Velasquez (3–1)** | Clark (6) | 2,134 | 24–14 | 6–3 |
| Apr 28 | UC Irvine | | Goodwin Field • Fullerton, CA | **W** 5–3 | **Seabold (6–4)** | Johnston (2–2) | **Conine (9)** | 1,826 | 25–14 | 7–3 |
| Apr 29 | UC Irvine | | Goodwin Field • Fullerton, CA | **W** 3–2^{14} | **Pabich (1–1)** | Pallanate (4–3) | None | 1,893 | 26–14 | 8–3 |
| Apr 30 | UC Irvine | | Goodwin Field • Fullerton, CA | **W** 4–12 | Bocko (1–4) | **Velasquez (3–2)** | None | 1,332 | 26–15 | 8–4 |

May
| Date | Opponent | Rank | Site/stadium | Score | Win | Loss | Save | Attendance | Overall record | Big West Record |
|---|---|---|---|---|---|---|---|---|---|---|
| May 5 | at Hawaii | | Les Murakami Stadium • Honolulu, HI | **W** 3–1 | **Seabold (7–4)** | Hornung (5–4) | **Conine (10)** | 3,088 | 27–15 | 9–4 |
| May 6 | at Hawaii | | Les Murakami Stadium • Honolulu, HI | **L** 1–4 | Rees (5–0) | **Gavin (5–2)** | Thomas (7) | 4,327 | 27–16 | 9–5 |
| May 7 | at Hawaii | | Les Murakami Stadium • Honolulu, HI | **W** 6–2 | **Workman (5–1)** | Uskali (6–3) | None | 3,272 | 28–16 | 10–5 |
| May 9 | UCLA* | | Goodwin Field • Fullerton, CA | **W** 4–3 | **Velasques (4–2)** | Hooper (1–1) | **Conine (11)** | 1,997 | 29–16 | |
| May 12 | UC Santa Barbara | | Goodwin Field • Fullerton, CA | **W** 8–4 | **Seabold (8–4)** | Nelson (6–4) | None | 1,508 | 30–16 | 11–5 |
| May 13 | UC Santa Barbara | | Goodwin Field • Fullerton, CA | **L** 3–6 | Ledesma (2–5) | **Pabich (1–2)** | Barry (4) | 1,667 | 30–17 | 11–6 |
| May 14 | UC Santa Barbara | | Goodwin Field • Fullerton, CA | **W** 12–3 | **Workman (6–1)** | Lincoln (1–3) | None | 1,260 | 31–17 | 12–6 |
| May 15 | Saint Mary's* | | Goodwin Field • Fullerton, CA | **L** 4–12 | Madrigal (5–3) | **Wills (4–2)** | 1,071 | 31–18 | | |
| May 19 | at Cal State Northridge | | Matador Field • Northridge, CA | **W** 3–2 | **Seabold (9–4)** | O'Neil (5–4) | **Conine (12)** | 433 | 32–18 | 13–6 |
| May 20 | at Cal State Northridge | | Matador Field • Northridge, CA | **W** 16–7 | **Gavin (6–2)** | Weston (5–4) | None | 397 | 33–18 | 14–6 |
| May 21 | at Cal State Northridge | | Matador Field • Northridge, CA | **L** 4–8 | Myers (6–6) | **Workman (6–2)** | None | 509 | 33–19 | 14–7 |
| May 25 | Long Beach State | | Goodwin Field • Fullerton, CA | **W** 6–3 | **Seabold (10–4)** | Sheaks (7–3) | 2,213 | 34–19 | 15–7 | |
| May 26 | Long Beach State | | Goodwin Field • Fullerton, CA | **L** 1–2^{10} | Rivera (1–1) | **Conine (0–1)** | None | 2,680 | 34–20 | 15–8 |
| May 27 | Long Beach State | | Goodwin Field • Fullerton, CA | **L** 0–1 | Baayoun (1–0) | **Velasques (4–3)** | Rivera (11) | 2,594 | 34–21 | 15–9 |

Postseason

NCAA Stanford Regional
| Date | Opponent | Rank | Site/stadium | Score | Win | Loss | Save | Attendance | Overall record | Regional Record |
|---|---|---|---|---|---|---|---|---|---|---|
| June 1 | BYU | | Klein Field at Sunken Diamond • Stanford, CA | **W** 13–2 | **Seabold (11–4)** | Corless (6–2 | None | 1,390 | 35–21 | 1–0 |
| June 2 | at Stanford | | Klein Field at Sunken Diamond • Stanford, CA | **W** 4–1 | **Gavin (7–2)** | Summerville (5–2) | **Conine (13)** | 2,222 | 36–21 | 2–0 |
| June 3 | at Stanford | | Klein Field at Sunken Diamond • Stanford, CA | **W** 4–2 | **Eastman (1–0)** | Miller (5–2) | **Conine (14)** | 1,745 | 37–21 | 3–0 |

NCAA Long Beach Super Regional
| Date | Opponent | Rank | Site/stadium | Score | Win | Loss | Save | Attendance | Overall record | SR Record |
|---|---|---|---|---|---|---|---|---|---|---|
| June 9 | at Long Beach State | | Blair Field • Long Beach, CA | **L** 0–3 | McCaughan (9–2) | **Seabold (11–5)** | Rivera (13) | 2,764 | 37–22 | 0–1 |
| June 10 | at Long Beach State | | Blair Field • Long Beach, CA | **W** 4–1 | **Gavin (8–2)** | Smith (9–2) | None | 2,867 | 38–22 | 1–1 |
| June 11 | at Long Beach State | | Blair Field • Long Beach, CA | **W** 4–2 | **Eastman (2–0)** | Sheaks (8–4) | **Conine (15)** | 2,896 | 39–22 | 2–1 |

NCAA College World Series
| Date | Opponent | Rank | Site/stadium | Score | Win | Loss | Save | Attendance | Overall record | Regional Record |
|---|---|---|---|---|---|---|---|---|---|---|
| June 17 | #1 Oregon State* | | TD Ameritrade Park • Omaha, NE | **L** 5–6 | Mulholland (7–1) | **Workman (6–3)** | Rasmussen (2) | 22,656 | 39–23 | 0–1 |
| June 19 | Florida State* | | TD Ameritrade Park • Omaha, NE | **L** 4–6 | Haney (3–2) | **Pabich (1–3)** | Carlton (7) | 17,229 | 39–24 | 0–2 |
