= 2017 Arizona Wildcats baseball team =

2017 Arizona Wildcats baseball

Lubbock Regional
- Conference: Pac-12 Conference
- CB: No. 24
- Record: 38–21 (16–14 Pac-12)
- Head coach: Jay Johnson (2nd season)
- Assistant coaches: Sergio Brown (2nd season); Dave Lawn (2nd season); Marc Wanaka (2nd season)
- Home stadium: Hi Corbett Field

The 2017 Arizona Wildcats baseball team represented the University of Arizona in the 2017 NCAA Division I baseball season. The Wildcats played their home games for the 6th season at Hi Corbett Field. The team was coached by Jay Johnson in his 2nd season at Arizona.

== Personnel ==
=== Roster ===
2017 Pac-12 Conference baseball standings
	Conf.				Overall
Team	W		L	PCT	W		L	PCT
No. 3 Oregon State ‍†‍‍^{y}	27	–	3	.900	56	–	6	.903
No. 18 Stanford ‍‍‍^{y}	21	–	9	.700	42	–	16	.724
UCLA ‍‍‍^{y}	19	–	11	.633	30	–	27	.526
No. 24 Arizona ‍‍‍^{y}	16	–	14	.533	38	–	21	.644
California ‍‍‍	15	–	15	.500	25	–	29	.463
Utah ‍‍‍	15	–	15	.500	27	–	24	.529
Washington ‍‍‍	14	–	16	.467	28	–	26	.519
Oregon ‍‍‍	12	–	18	.400	30	–	25	.545
Washington State ‍‍‍	10	–	20	.333	24	–	29	.453
Arizona State ‍‍‍	8	–	22	.267	23	–	32	.418
USC ‍‍‍	8	–	22	.267	21	–	34	.382
† – Conference champion y – Invited to the NCAA tournament Rankings from Collegiate Baseball

2017 Arizona Wildcats roster
Pitchers: 4 – Landon Faulkner – Junior; 15 – Cody Deason – Sophomore; 17 – Randy Labaut – Freshman; 18 – Ryan Gowens – Junior; 19 – Zach Sherman – Freshman; 21 – Seve Romo – Junior; 23 – Robby Medel – Junior; 26 – Michael Flynn – Sophomore; 27 – J.C. Cloney – Senior; 29 – Rio Gomez – Junior; 30 – Preston Price – Freshman; 33 – Austin Schnabel – Senior; 34 – Juan Aguilera – Junior; 36 – Tylor Megill – Junior; 40 – Luke Soroko – Senior; 43 – Jason Seever – Junior; 44 – Austin Nichols – Freshman; 47 – Cameron Ming – Junior	Catchers: 6 – Ryan Haug – Junior; 12 – Cesar Salazar – Sophomore; 20 – Cory Voss – Junior; Infielders: 1 – Sawyer Gieseke – Senior; 5 – Louis Boyd – Senior; 10 – Shane Martinez – Freshman; 13 – Nick Quintana – Freshman; 14 – Casey Bowman – Senior; 24 – J. J. Matijevic – Junior; 28 – Kyle Lewis – Senior; 35 – Cameron Cannon – Freshman	Outfielders: 3 – Cal Stevenson – Junior; 16 – Mitchell Morimoto – Junior; 22 – Matt Fraizer – Freshman; 25 – Alfonso Rivas III – Junior; 42 – Jared Oliva – Junior

=== Coaches ===
2017 Arizona Wildcats baseball coaching staff
- Jay Johnson – Head coach
- Sergio Brown – Assistant coach
- Dave Lawn – Assistant coach
- Marc Wanaka – Volunteer assistant coach

=== Opening day ===
Opening Day Starters
Name	Position
Mitchell Morimoto	Left fielder
Cal Stevenson	Right fielder
Jared Oliva	Center fielder
J.J. Matijevic	First baseman
Nick Quintana	Third baseman
Kyle Lewis	Second baseman
Cory Voss	Designated hitter
Cesar Salazar	Catcher
Louis Boyd	Shortstop
J.C. Cloney	Starting pitcher

== Schedule and results ==
2017 Arizona Wildcats baseball game log
Regular season
Date	Opponent	Rank	Site/stadium	Score	Win	Loss	Save	Overall Record	Pac-12 Record
Feb 17	vs Eastern Kentucky	#15	Hi Corbett Field • Tucson, AZ	W 6–0	Cloney (1–0)	Piekos (0–1)	None	1–0	
Feb 18	vs Eastern Kentucky	#15	Hi Corbett Field • Tucson, AZ	W 16–13	Faulkner (1–0)	Mroz (0–1)	Ming (1)	2–0	
Feb 19	vs Eastern Kentucky	#15	Hi Corbett Field • Tucson, AZ	W 18–4	Gomez (1–0)	Ochsenbein (0–1)	None	3–0	
Feb 20	vs Eastern Kentucky	#15	Hi Corbett Field • Tucson, AZ	W 9–8	Ming (1–0)	Mroz (0–2)	None	4–0	
Feb 23	vs McNeese State	#15	Hi Corbett Field • Tucson, AZ	W 9–3	Cloney (2–0)	King (1–1)	None	5–0	
Feb 24	vs McNeese State	#15	Hi Corbett Field • Tucson, AZ	W 8–3	Flynn (1–0)	Anderson (0–1)	None	6–0	
Feb 25	vs McNeese State	#15	Hi Corbett Field • Tucson, AZ	W 12–3	Gomez (2–0)	Sanders (1–1)	None	7–0	
Feb 26	vs McNeese State	#15	Hi Corbett Field • Tucson, AZ	W 12–5	Ming (2–0)	Kober (1–1)	None	8–0	
Mar 3	vs #20 Arkansas	#9	Dr Pepper Ballpark • Frisco, TX	W 3–0	Cloney (3–0)	Knight (1–1)	Ming (2)	9–0	
Mar 4	vs Oklahoma State	#9	Dr Pepper Ballpark • Frisco, TX	W 10–9	Ming (3–0)	Heasley (1–2)	None	10–0	
Mar 5	vs Nebraska	#9	Dr Pepper Ballpark • Frisco, TX	L 0–1	Meyers (1–1)	Gomez (2–1)	Luensmann (2)	10–1	
Mar 7	at #14 Texas Tech	#11	Dan Law Field • Lubbock, TX	L 1–13	Patterson (3–0)	Megill (0–1)	None	10–2	
Mar 10	vs Hartford	#11	Hi Corbett Field • Tucson, AZ	W 21–5	Cloney (4–0)	Devito (1–1)	Soroko (1)	11–2	
Mar 11	vs Hartford	#11	Hi Corbett Field • Tucson, AZ	W 25–3	Flynn (2–0)	Drouin (0–2)	None	12–2	
Mar 12	vs Hartford	#11	Hi Corbett Field • Tucson, AZ	W 17–13	Faulkner (2–0)	LaRossa (0–1)	None	13–2	
Mar 15	at #7 Cal State Fullerton	#12	Goodwin Field • Fullerton, CA	L 0–4	Brown (1–1)	Gomez (2–2)	None	13–3	
Mar 17	at UCLA	#12	Jackie Robinson Stadium • Los Angeles, CA	W 19–4	Cloney (5–0)	Canning (0–1)	None	14–3	1–0
Mar 18	at UCLA	#12	Jackie Robinson Stadium • Los Angeles, CA	W 4–3	Ming (4–0)	Burke (0–2)	None	15–3	2–0
Mar 19	at UCLA	#12	Jackie Robinson Stadium • Los Angeles, CA	L 7–8	Walker (1–0)	Rivas (0–1)	None	15–4	2–1
Mar 21	vs New Mexico State	#6	Hi Corbett Field • Tucson, AZ	W 6–3	Deason (1–0)	Groff (2–3)	Flynn (1)	16–4	
Mar 24	at #2 Oregon State	#6	Goss Stadium • Corvallis, OR	L 3–4	Mulholland (2–0)	Megill (0–2)	None	16–5	2–2
Mar 25	at #2 Oregon State	#6	Goss Stadium • Corvallis, OR	L 4–5	Engelbrekt (1–0)	Deason (1–1)	None	16–6	2–3
Mar 26	at #2 Oregon State	#6	Goss Stadium • Corvallis, OR	L 7–11	Eisert (1–0)	Gomez (2–3)	None	16–7	2–4
Mar 29	vs Grand Canyon	#13	Hi Corbett Field • Tucson, AZ	W 3–2	Romo (1–0)	Andrews (0–1)	Faulkner (1)	17–7	
Mar 31	vs Southern California	#13	Hi Corbett Field • Tucson, AZ	W 9–4	Cloney (6–0)	Clarke (2–1)	None	18–7	3–4
Apr 1	vs Southern California	#13	Hi Corbett Field • Tucson, AZ	W 5–1	Labaut (1–0)	Stubbs (0–1)	Deason (1)	19–7	4–4
Apr 2	vs Southern California	#13	Hi Corbett Field • Tucson, AZ	W 8–1	Gomez (3–3)	Crouse (2–3)	None	20–7	5–4
Apr 4	vs Arizona State	#8	Hi Corbett Field • Tucson, AZ	W 11–2	Megill (1–2)	Godfrey (2–2)	None	21–7	
Apr 7	at Washington State	#8	Bailey-Brayton Field • Pullman, WA	W 19–5	Deason (2–1)	Jones (2–3)	Soroko (2)	22–7	6–4
Apr 8	at Washington State	#8	Bailey-Brayton Field • Pullman, WA	L 3–9	Walker (3–3)	Labaut (1–1)	None	22–8	6–5
Apr 9	at Washington State	#8	Bailey-Brayton Field • Pullman, WA	W 6–5	Ming (5–0)	Rosenstein (0–1)	Megill (1)	23–8	7–5
Apr 11	at Grand Canyon	#7	Brazell Stadium • Phoenix, AZ	W 7–3	Romo (2–0)	Hansen (0–3)	None	24–8	
Apr 13	vs Oregon	#7	Hi Corbett Field • Tucson, AZ	L 4–8	Peterson (7–1)	Labaut (1–2)	Yovan (12)	24–9	7–6
Apr 14	vs Oregon	#7	Hi Corbett Field • Tucson, AZ	W 5–4	Cloney (7–0)	Mercer (5–2)	Deason (2)	25–9	8–6
Apr 15	vs Oregon	#7	Hi Corbett Field • Tucson, AZ	W 18–4	Gomez (4–3)	Carranza (2–1)	None	26–9	9–6
Apr 20	vs Utah	#7	Hi Corbett Field • Tucson, AZ	L 5–12	Rose (5–2)	Romo (2–1)	Rebar (1)	26–10	9–7
Apr 21	vs Utah	#7	Hi Corbett Field • Tucson, AZ	L 3–7	Drachler (1–3)	Megill (1–3)	None	26–11	9–8
Apr 22	vs Utah	#7	Hi Corbett Field • Tucson, AZ	L 2–4	Lapiana (3–4)	Gomez (4–4)	None	26–12	9–9
Apr 25	vs New Mexico State	#13	Hi Corbett Field • Tucson, AZ	W 11–2	Deason (3–1)	Butts (0–3)	None	27–12	
Apr 27	at #18 Stanford	#13	Sunken Diamond • Stanford, CA	L 2–3	Bubic (4–6)	Ming (5–1)	Hock (10)	27–13	9–10
Apr 28	at #18 Stanford	#13	Sunken Diamond • Stanford, CA	L 3–4	Thorne (3–1)	Gomez (4–5)	Hock (11)	27–14	9–11
Apr 29	at #18 Stanford	#13	Sunken Diamond • Stanford, CA	L1–3	Castellanos (7–1)	Deason (3–2)	Thorne (2)	27–15	9–12
May 1	at Santa Clara	#19	Schott Stadium • Santa Clara, CA	W 16–10	Megill (2–3)	Barden (0–3)	None	28–15	
May 5	vs Washington	#19	Hi Corbett Field • Tucson, AZ	W 5–4	Gomez (5–5)	Nierenberg (1–3)	None	29–15	10–12
May 6	vs Washington	#19	Hi Corbett Field • Tucson, AZ	W 3–1	Ming (6–1)	Jones (4–7)	None	30–15	11–12
May 7	vs Washington	#19	Hi Corbett Field • Tucson, AZ	W 12–11	Faulkner (3–0)	Nierenberg (1–4)	None	31–15	12–12
May 9	vs Arizona State	#18	Hi Corbett Field • Tucson, AZ	L 13–14	Erives (1–3)	Medel (0–1)	None	31–16	
May 12	at College of Charleston	#18	Patriots Point • Mount Pleasant, SC	L 0–1	Ober (6–1)	Cloney (7–1)	None	31–17	
May 13	at College of Charleston	#18	Patriots Point • Mount Pleasant, SC	W 4–3	Flynn (3–0)	Love (2–3)	None	32–17	
May 14	at College of Charleston	#18	Patriots Point • Mount Pleasant, SC	W 6–0	Deason (4–2)	Frishmuth (3–5)	Megill (2)	33–17	
May 18	at Arizona State	#18	Phoenix Municipal Stadium • Phoenix, AZ	W 6–5	Flynn (4–0)	Erives (1–4)	Megill (3)	34–17	13–12
May 19	at Arizona State	#18	Phoenix Municipal Stadium • Phoenix, AZ	W 3–1	Ming (7–1)	Lingos (6–6)	None	35–17	14–12
May 20	at Arizona State	#18	Phoenix Municipal Stadium • Phoenix, AZ	W 9–5	Deason (5–2)	Montoya (4–4)	None	36–17	15–12
May 26	vs California	#14	Hi Corbett Field • Tucson, AZ	W 10–3	Flynn (5–0)	Dodson (2–6)	None	37–17	16–12
May 27	vs California	#14	Hi Corbett Field • Tucson, AZ	L 6–9	Martinez (5–4)	Ming (7–2)	Dodson (2)	37–18	16–13
May 28	vs California	#14	Hi Corbett Field • Tucson, AZ	L 4–7	Shortridge (1–0)	Gomez (5–6)	Lutz (1)	37–19	16–14
NCAA Lubbock Regional
May 28	vs (3) Sam Houston State	#15	Dan Law Field • Lubbock, TX	L 4–5	Cooper (2–3)	Cloney (7–2)	Mikolajchak (11)	37–20	
May 28	vs (4) Delaware	#15	Dan Law Field • Lubbock, TX	W 6–5	Aguilera (1–0)	FitzPatrick (2–1)	None	38–20	
May 28	vs (3) Sam Houston State	#15	Dan Law Field • Lubbock, TX	L 3–9	Wesneski (10–2)	Deason (5–3)	None	38–21	

=== Lubbock Regional ===
Lubbock Regional Teams
(1) Texas Tech Red Raiders	(4) Delaware Fightin' Blue Hens	(2) Arizona Wildcats	(3) Sam Houston State Bearkats

== 2017 MLB draft ==
Player	Position	Round	Overall	MLB team
J. J. Matijevic	2B	2	75	Houston Astros
Jared Oliva	CF	7	208	Pittsburgh Pirates
J.C. Cloney	LHP	9	270	Kansas City Royals
Cameron Ming	LHP	14	428	Baltimore Orioles
Louis Boyd	SS	24	723	Seattle Mariners
Rio Gomez	LHP	36	1091	Boston Red Sox
