= 2017 NCAA Division I baseball rankings =

2017 NCAA Division I baseball season
- Duration: February 13, 2017–June 29, 2017
- Number of teams: 301
- Preseason No. 1: TCU (Unanimous)

Tournament
- Duration: June 2–June 29

College World Series
- Champions: Florida (1 title)
- Runners-up: LSU
- MOP: Alex Faedo, Florida

Seasons
- ← 2016 2018 →

The following human polls make up the 2017 NCAA Division I men's baseball rankings. The USA Today/ESPN Coaches Poll is voted on by a panel of 31 Division I baseball coaches. The Baseball America poll is voted on by staff members of the Baseball America magazine. These polls, along with the Perfect Game USA poll, rank the top 25 teams nationally. Collegiate Baseball and the National Collegiate Baseball Writers Association rank the top 30 teams nationally.

== Legend ==
	Increase in ranking
	Decrease in ranking
	Not ranked previous week
Italics	Number of first place votes
(#–#)	Win–loss record
т	Tied with team above or below also with this symbol

== ESPN/USA Today Coaches Poll ==
	Preseason Jan 26	Week 3 Mar 6	Week 4 Mar 13	Week 5 Mar 20	Week 6 Mar 27	Week 7 Apr 3	Week 8 Apr 10	Week 9 Apr 17	Week 10 Apr 24	Week 11 May 1	Week 12 May 8	Week 13 May 15	Week 14 May 22	Week 15 May 29	Final Jun 28	
1.	TCU 24	TCU 30 (10–1)	Louisville 12 (15–0)	Louisville 19 (19–0)	Oregon State 30 (20–1)	Oregon State 30 (24–1)	Oregon State 30(28–1)	Oregon State 27 (30-2)	Oregon State 31 (32-3)	Oregon State 29 (34-4)	Oregon State 31 (38-4)	Oregon State 28 (45-4)	Oregon State 31 (45-4)	Oregon State 29 (49-4)	Florida 27 (52–19)	1.
2.	Florida 4	Florida 1 (10–2)	Oregon State 5 (14–1)	Oregon State 12 (17–1)	Texas Tech (22–4)	Louisville (24–3)	Louisville (27–4)	Louisville 3 (31-4)	Louisville (33-6)	Louisville 1 (38-6)	Louisville (42-6)	Louisville 3 (46-6)	North Carolina (44-11)	North Carolina (47-12)	LSU (52–20)	2.
3.	LSU 2	Florida State (9–2)	Florida State 5 (13–3)	Texas Tech (17–4)	Louisville 1 (21–2)	TCU (22–5)	TCU (26–5)	North Carolina (29-7)	Clemson (33-8)	North Carolina (36-9)	North Carolina (37-9)	North Carolina (41-10)	Texas Tech (42-13)	LSU (43-17)	Oregon State (56–6)	3.
4.	South Carolina	Oregon State (10–1)	TCU 7 (12–3)	LSU (16–5)	TCU (17–5)	Clemson (24–5)	Clemson (28–5)	Clemson (30-6)	North Carolina (31-9)	Texas Tech (36-12)	Texas Tech (39-13)	Texas Tech (39-13)	Florida (40-15)	Florida (42-16)	TCU (50–18)	4.
5.	Florida State	Louisville (11–0)	Florida 1 (12–5)	TCU (14–5)	Clemson (20–4)	North Carolina (22–6)	North Carolina (26–6)	Texas Tech (31-8)	TCU (30-8)	Kentucky (31-14)	Florida (35-13)	Florida (38-14)	Louisville (46-9)	Texas Tech (43-15)	Louisville (53–12)	5.
6.	Vanderbilt	Arizona (10–1)	Texas Tech (14–3)	Arizona (15–4)	South Carolina (17–6)	Texas Tech (25–6)	Texas Tech (28–70	TCU (28-7)	Texas Tech (33-10)	Clemson (34-11)	TCU (35-11)	LSU (35-17)	LSU (39-17)	Louisville (47-10)	Florida State (46–23)	6.
7.	Oregon State	LSU (9–3)	LSU (12–4)	Clemson (16–4)	North Carolina (18–6)	Florida (20–9)	Arizona (23–8)	Arizona (26-9)	Kentucky (28-13)	Florida (30-13)	Clemson (35-12)	Kentucky (36-16)	TCU (39-14)	TCU (42-16)	Cal State Fullerton (39–24)	7.
8.	Louisville	Virginia (11–1)	Arizona (13–2)	South Carolina (14–5)	LSU (18–7)	Arizona (20–7)	LSU (22–11)	LSU (25-12)	Florida (27-13)	TCU (31-11)	Kentucky (32-16)	TCU (36-13)	Stanford (37-14)	Stanford (40-14)	Texas A&M (41–23)	8.
9.	Coastal Carolina 1	Texas Tech (11–2)	North Carolina (10–4)	North Carolina (15–5)	Florida (16–9)	South Carolina (19–8)	Cal State Fullerton (21–10)	Cal State Fullerton (23-11)	Auburn (30-12)	Auburn (32-14)	Mississippi State (32-17)	Virginia (38-12)	Kentucky (38-18)	Long Beach State (37-17-1)	Long Beach State (42–20–1)	9.
10.	East Carolina	North Carolina (9–3)	Clemson (12–3)	Cal State Fullerton (14–5)	Florida State (18–7)	Kentucky (21-8)	Florida (21–11)	Florida (24-12)	Virginia (33-10)	Virginia (35-11)	Virginia (36-11)	Stanford (33-13)	Virginia (41-13)	Kentucky (39-20)	Kentucky (43–23)	10.
11.	Cal State Fullerton	Clemson (8–3)	Virginia (13–1)	Florida State (14–7)	Arizona (16–7)	Auburn (23–7)	South Carolina (21–10)	Virginia (29-9)	LSU (27-14)	LSU (30-15)	LSU (32-16)	Long Beach State (32-16-1)	Long Beach State (35-16-1)	Virginia (42-14)	Wake Forest (43–20)	11.
12.	Clemson	Texas A&M (9–3)	South Carolina (11–5)	Florida (13–8)	Florida Gulf Coast (22–3)	St. John's (21–2)	Virginia (26–8)	Auburn (27-11)	Arizona (26-12)	Long Beach State (28-14)	Long Beach State (30-15-1)	Clemson (37-15)	Southern Mississippi (44-12)	Arkansas (42-17)	Mississippi State (40–27)	12.
13.	North Carolina	South Carolina (7–5)	Texas A&M (14–3)	Stanford (11–5)	St. John's (18–2)	LSU (19–10)	Auburn (24–10)	Kentucky (25-12)	Mississippi State (28-14)	Mississippi State (30-16)	Stanford (30-13)	Mississippi State (33-19)	Arkansas (39-15)	Southern Mississippi (48-14)	North Carolina (49–14)	13.
14.	NC State	Stanford (9–3)	Baylor (14–2)	Ole Miss (14–6)	Stanford (13–6)	Oklahoma (25–6)	Kentucky (22–11)	Arkansas (29-8)	Arkansas (32-10)	Stanford (27-12)	Auburn (32-17)	Cal State Fullerton (31-17)	Clemson (39-17)	Wake Forest (39-18)	Missouri State (43–20)	14.
15.	Arizona	Baylor (11–1)	Cal State Fullerton (9–5)	St. John's (14–2)	Cal State Fullerton (15–8)	Arkansas (22–6)	Arkansas (25–8)	Michigan (29-7)	Long Beach State (25-13)	Arkansas (34-12)	Cal State Fullerton (28-16)	Michigan (39-12)	Michigan (42-13)	Clemson (39-19)	Texas Tech (45–17)	15.
16.	Louisiana–Lafayette	St. John's (10–1)	St. John's (12–2)	Virginia (15–5)	Virginia (19–6)	Cal State Fullerton (17–10)	Oklahoma (27–8)	Mississippi State (25-13)	Cal State Fullerton (24-14)	Cal State Fullerton (26-15)	Arkansas (35-13)	Arkansas (37-14)	Wake Forest (38-17)	Arizona (37-19)	Vanderbilt (36–25–1)	16.
17.	Miami (FL)	Cal State Fullerton (5–4) т	East Carolina (12–4)	Florida Gulf Coast (18–3)	Auburn (20–6)	Florida Gulf Coast (24–5)	Michigan (25–7)	Wake Forest (28-10)	Michigan (31-9)	Texas A&M (32-13)	Michigan (35-11)	Southern Mississippi (40-12)	Arizona (36-17)	Florida State (39-20)	Stanford (42–16)	17.
18.	Virginia	East Carolina (8–3) т	Stanford (11–5)	Baylor (16–4)	Oklahoma (23–5)	Virginia (21–8)	Southern Miss (26–7)	South Carolina (22-13)	St. John's (29-5)	Michigan (33-10)	Arizona (31-15)	Wake Forest (35-16)	Cal State Fullerton (33-19)	Mississippi State (36-24)	Arkansas (45–19)	18.
19.	Texas Tech	Oklahoma (13–1)	Ole Miss (11–5)	Oklahoma (21–3)	Kentucky (18–7)	Florida State (18–11)	Stanford (17–10)	Long Beach State (22-12)	Wake Forest (29-13)	Arizona (27-15)	Texas A&M (34-15)	Arizona (33-17)	Mississippi State (34-22)	Cal State Fullerton (34-21)	Sam Houston State (44–23)	19.
20.	Texas A&M	Ole Miss (7–4)	Louisiana–Lafayette (9–4)	Missouri (19–1)	Arkansas (20–5)	Southern Miss (24–5)	St. John's (22–5)	St. John's (26-5)	Stanford (23-12)	Wake Forest (30-13)	Wake Forest (32-14)	St. John's (37-8)	St. John's (40-9)	Houston (40-19)	Southern Miss (50–16)	20.
21.	Stanford	Louisiana–Lafayette (6–4)	Oklahoma (17–2)	Michigan (15–4)	Baylor (18–6)	Michigan (22–6)	Mississippi State (22–12)	Southern Mississippi (28-9)	South Carolina (24-15)	St. John's (31-7)	Southern Mississippi (37-12)	Missouri State (36-14)	Missouri State (37-15)	Michigan (42-15)	Virginia (43–16)	21.
22.	Oklahoma State	Coastal Carolina (9–5)	Michigan (12–3)	Louisiana–Lafayette (11–6)	Ole Miss (15–9)	Wake Forest (21–8)	Wake Forest (23–10)	Oklahoma (27-12)	Texas A&M (28-13)	Southern Mississippi (34-12)	St. John's (34-8)	Texas A&M (35-17)	UCF (38-18)	Missouri State (40-17)	Clemson (42–21)	22.
23.	UC Santa Barbara	Georgia Tech (9–2)	Vanderbilt (11–6)	Texas A&M (14–7)	Missouri (21–3)	Stanford (14–9)	Houston (23–8)	Houston (25-10)	Houston (27-12)	South Florida (34-10)	South Florida (37-10)	Auburn (32-21)	Nebraska (34-18-1)	St. John's (42-11)	Davidson (35–26)	23.
24.	Ole Miss	Louisiana Tech (11–1) т	Louisiana Tech (13–2)	Auburn (17–5)	Louisiana–Lafayette (13–9)	San Diego (19–6)	Long Beach State (20–11)	San Diego (25-9)	Maryland (28-11)	Missouri State (30-13)	Missouri State (33-14)	Oklahoma (34-18)	Auburn (34-22)	UCF (40-20)	Houston (42–21)	24.
25.	Rice	Vanderbilt (7–5) т	Missouri (15–1)	Kentucky (15–6)	Houston (18–5)	Mississippi State (19–10)	Florida State (21–13)	West Virginia (21-13)	Southern Mississippi (30-12)	Maryland (29-13)	Florida State (31-18)	South Florida (39-12)	Texas A&M (36-20)	Texas (37-22)	Texas (39–24)	25.
	Preseason Jan 26	Week 3 Mar 6	Week 4 Mar 13	Week 5 Mar 20	Week 6 Mar 27	Week 7 Apr 3	Week 8 Apr 10	Week 9 Apr 17	Week 10 Apr 24	Week 11 May 1	Week 12 May 8	Week 13 May 15	Week 14 May 22	Week 15 May 29	Final Jun 28	
		Dropped: 14. NC State; 17. Miami (FL); 22. Oklahoma State; 23. UC Santa Barbara; 25. Rice	Dropped: 22. Coastal Carolina; 23. Georgia Tech	Dropped: 17. East Carolina; 23. Vanderbilt; 24. Louisiana Tech	Dropped: 21. Michigan; 23. Texas A&M	Dropped: 21. Baylor; 22. Ole Miss; 23. Missouri; 24. Louisiana–Lafayette; 25. Houston	Dropped: 17. Florida Gulf Coast; 24. San Diego	Dropped: 19. Stanford; 25. Florida State	Dropped: 22. Oklahoma; 24. San Diego; 25. West Virginia	Dropped: 21. South Carolina; 23. Houston	Dropped: 25. Maryland	Dropped: 25. Florida State	Dropped: 24. Oklahoma; 25. South Florida	Dropped: 23. Nebraska; 24. Auburn; 25. Texas A&M	Dropped: No. 16 Arizona; No. 21 Michigan; No. 23 St. John's; No. 24 UCF	

== Baseball America ==
	Preseason Jan 23	Week 1 Feb 20	Week 2 Feb 27	Week 3 Mar 6	Week 4 Mar 13	Week 5 Mar 20	Week 6 Mar 27	Week 7 Apr 3	Week 8 Apr 10	Week 9 Apr 17	Week 10	Week 11	Week 12	Week 13	Week 14	Week 15	Final Jun 28	
1.	TCU	TCU (3–0)	TCU (6–1)	TCU (10–1)	Louisville (15–0)	Louisville (19–0)	Oregon State (20–1)	Oregon State (24–1)	Oregon State (28–1)	Oregon State (30–2)							Florida (52-19)	1.
2.	Florida State	Florida State (2–1)	Florida State (5–2)	Florida State (9–2)	Florida State (13–3)	Oregon State (17–1)	Louisville (21–2)	Louisville (24–3)	Louisville (27–4)	Louisville (31–4)							Louisiana State (52-20)	2.
3.	Florida	Florida (3–0)	Florida (6–1)	Florida (10–2)	TCU (12–3)	TCU (14–5	TCU (17–5)	TCU (22–5)	TCU (26–5)	North Carolina (29–7)							Oregon State (56-6)	3.
4.	LSU	LSU (3–0)	LSU (7–1)	Louisville (11–0)	Oregon State (14–1)	LSU (17–5)	Texas Tech (22–4)	North Carolina (22–6)	North Carolina (26–6)	Texas Tech (31–8)							TCU (50-18)	4.
5.	South Carolina	South Carolina (2–1)	South Carolina (5–3)	Oregon State (10–1)	Florida (12–5)	Cal State Fullerton (14–5)	Clemson (20–4)	Clemson (24–5)	Clemson (28–5)	Clemson (30–6)							Louisville (53-12)	5.
6.	East Carolina	Louisville (3–0)	Louisville (7–0)	LSU (9–3)	LSU (12–4)	Clemson (16–4)	South Carolina (17–6)	Texas Tech (25–6)	Texas Tech (28–7)	Arizona (26–9)							Florida State (46-23)	6.
7.	Louisville	Cal State Fullerton (2–1)	Cal State Fullerton (4–3)	Cal State Fullerton (5–4)	Cal State Fullerton (9–5)	South Carolina (14–5)	North Carolina (18–6)	Auburn (23–7)	Arizona (23–8)	TCU (26–5)							Cal State Fullerton (39-24)	7.
8.	Cal State Fullerton	Oregon State (3–0)	Oregon State (7–1)	East Carolina (8–3)	East Carolina (12–4)	Texas Tech (17–4)	Florida (16–9)	Florida (20–9)	Cal State Fullerton (21–10)	Cal State Fullerton (23–11)							Long Beach State (42-20)	8.
9.	Oregon State	Vanderbilt (2–1)	East Carolina (4–3)	Clemson (8–3)	Clemson (12–3)	Arizona (15–4)	LSU (18–7)	Oklahoma (25–6)	LSU (22–11)	LSU (25–12)							Kentucky (43-23)	9.
10.	Clemson	Washington (2–1)	NC State (4–2)	South Carolina (7–5)	South Carolina (11–5)	North Carolina (15–5)	Cal State Fullerton (15–8)	Arizona (20–7)	Auburn (24–10)	Auburn (27–11)							Texas A&M (41-23)	10.
11.	Vanderbilt	East Carolina (0–3)	Washington (4–3)	Arizona (10–1)	Texas Tech (14–3)	Ole Miss (14–6)	Florida Gulf Coast (22–3)	South Carolina (19–8)	Oklahoma (27–8)	Mississippi State (25–13)							North Carolina (49-14)	11.
12.	Washington	NC State (2–1)	Virginia (7–0)	Washington (7–4)	Arizona (13–2)	Florida Gulf Coast (18–3)	Florida State (18–7)	Cal State Fullerton (17–10)	Long Beach State (20–11)	Long Beach State (20–11)							Texas Tech (45-17)	12.
13.	Louisiana–Lafayette	Virginia (3–0)	North Carolina (4–0)	Virginia (11–1)	North Carolina (12–4)	Florida (13–8)	Arizona (16–7)	Kentucky (21–8)	Mississippi State (22–12)	Virginia (29–9)							Wake Forest (43-20)	13.
14.	NC State	North Carolina (3–0)	Vanderilt (2–2)	Texas Tech (11–2)	Louisiana–Lafayette (9–4)	Florida State (14–7)	St. John's (18–2)	St. John's (21–2)	Virginia (26–8)	Kentucky (25–12)							Mississippi Statte (40-27)	14.
15.	Coastal Carolina	Clemson (1–2)	Clemson (5–2)	Louisiana–Lafayette (6–4)	Virginia (13–3)	Louisiana–Lafayette (11–6)	Stanford (13–6)	LSU (19–10)	Kentucky (22–11)	Florida (24–12)							Stanford (42-16)	15.
16.	Virginia	Louisiana–Lafayette (1–1)	Louisiana–Lafayette (3–3)	Stanford (9–3)	Baylor (14–2)	St. John's (14–2)	Kentucky (18–7)	Arkansas (22–6)	Florida (21–11)	Arkansas (29–8)							Southern Mississippi (50-16)	16.
17.	North Carolina	Georgia Tech (3–0)	Georgia Tech (6–1)	North Carolina (9–3)	Stanford (11–5)	Stanford (11–5)	Oklahoma (23–5)	Wake Forest (21–8)	South Carolina (21–10)	Wake Forest (28–10)							Missouri State (43-20)	17.
18.	Oklahoma State	Coastal Carolina (1–2)	Coastal Carolina (4–4)	Coastal Carolina (9–5)	Ole Miss (11–5)	Missouri (19–1)	Auburn (20–6)	Florida Gulf Coast (24–5)	Stanford (17–10)	Michigan (29–7)							Vanderbilt (36-25)	18.
19.	UC Santa Barbara	Arizona (3–0)	Arizona (8–0)	Georgia Tech (9–2)	St. John's (12–2)	Virginia (15–5)	Virginia (19–6)	Long Beach State (16–11)	Arkansas (25–8)	Oklahoma (27–12)							Arkansas (45-19)	19.
20.	Long Beach State	Oklahoma State (1–1)	Ole Miss (7–0)	NC State (6–5)	Coastal Carolina (11–7)	Baylor (16–)	Ole Miss (15–9)	Stanford (14–9)	Wake Forest (23–10)	Southern Miss (28–9)							Sam Houston State (44-23)	20.
21.	Georgia Tech	Texas Tech (3–1)	Texas Tech (8–1)	Ole Miss (7–4)	Florida Gulf Coast (14–3)	Oklahoma State (14–6)	Arkansas (20–5)	Southern Miss (24–5)	Southern Miss (26–7)	West Virginia (21–13)							Virginia (43-16)	21.
22.	Arizona	Ole Miss (3–0)	Stanford (5–2)	St. John's (10–1)	Texas A&M (14–3)	Washington (12–6)	Baylor (18–6)	Mississippi State (19–10)	Oregon (21–8)	St. John's (26–5)							Houston (42-21)	22.
23.	Stanford	Stanford (1–2)	UC Santa Barbara (4–3)	Oklahoma State (6–5)	Oklahoma State (9–6)	Michigan (15–4)	Houston (18–5)	Virginia (21–8)	Michigan (25–7)	Texas A&M (26–11)							Clemson (42-21)	23.
24.	Maryland	UC Santa Barbara (1–2)	Oklahoma State (4–3)	Baylor (11–1)	Michigan (12–3)	Oklahoma (21–3)	Wake Forest (18–7)	Florida State (18–11)	St. John's (22–5)	Houston (25–10)							Texas (39-24)	24.
25.	Texas Tech	Wright State (2–1)	Texas A&M (6–1)	Texas A&M (9–3)	Washington (9–6)	East Carolina (13–7)	East Carolina (17–8)	Maryland (18–8)	Connecticut (19–10)	Oregon (23–10)							Auburn (37-26)	25.
	Preseason Jan 23	Week 1 Feb 20	Week 2 Feb 27	Week 3 Mar 6	Week 4 Mar 13	Week 5 Mar 20	Week 6 Mar 27	Week 7 Apr 3	Week 8 Apr 10	Week 9 Apr 17	Week 10	Week 11	Week 12	Week 13	Week 14	Week 15	Final Jun 28	
		Dropped: 20. Long Beach State; 24. Maryland	Dropped: 25. Wright State	Dropped: 14. Vanderbilt; 23. UC Santa Barbara	Dropped: 19. Georgia Tech; 20. NC State	Dropped: 20. Coastal Carolina; 22. Texas A&M	Dropped: 15. Louisiana–Lafayette; 18. Missouri; 21. Oklahoma State; 22. Washington; 23. Michigan	Dropped: 20. Ole Miss; 22. Baylor; 23. Houston; 25. East Carolina	Dropped: 18. Florida Gulf Coast; 24. Florida State; 25. Maryland	Dropped: 17. South Carolina; 18. Stanford; 25. Connecticut	None	None	None	None	None	None	Dropped: Arizona; Central Florida; Florida Gulf Coast; Nebraska	

== Collegiate Baseball ==
	Preseason Dec 19	Week 1 Feb 20	Week 2 Feb 27	Week 3 Mar 6	Week 4 Mar 13	Week 5 Mar 20	Week 6 Mar 27	Week 7 Apr 3	Week 8 Apr 10	Week 9 Apr 17	Week 10 Apr 24	Week 11 May 1	Week 12 May 8	Week 13 May 15	Week 14 May 22	Week 15 May 29	Week 16 June 6	Week 17 June 12	Final June 28	
1.	TCU	TCU (3–0)	TCU (6–1)	TCU (10–1)	Oregon State (14–1)	Oregon State (17–1) т	Oregon State (20–1)	Oregon State (24–1)	Oregon State (28–1)	Oregon State (30–2)	Oregon St. (32–3)	Oregon State (34–4)	Oregon State (38–4)	Oregon State (41–4)	Oregon State (45–4)	Oregon State (49-4)	Oregon State (52–4)	Oregon State (54–4)	Florida (52–19)	1.
2.	LSU	LSU (3–0)	Florida (6–1)	Florida (10–2)	Louisville (15–0)	Louisville (19–0) т	Louisville (21–2)	Louisville (24–3)	TCU (26–5)	Louisville (31–4)	TCU (30–8)	Louisville (38–6)	Louisville (42–6)	Louisville (46–6)	Florida (40–15)	LSU (43-17)	LSU (46–17)	LSU (48–17)	LSU (52–20)	2.
3.	Florida	Florida (3–0)	LSU (7–1)	Oregon State (10–1)	TCU (12–3)	TCU (14–5)	TCU (17–5)	TCU (22–5)	Louisville (27–4)	TCU (28–7)	Louisville (33–6)	North Carolina (36–9)	North Carolina (37–9)	North Carolina (41–10)	LSU (39–17)	Florida (42-16)	Florida (45–17)	Florida (47–18)	Oregon State (56–6)	3.
4.	South Carolina	South Carolina (2–1)	Oregon State (7–1)	Arizona (10–1)	Texas Tech (12–3)	Texas Tech (17–4)	Texas Tech (22–4)	St. John's (21–2)	Clemson (28–5)	North Carolina (29–7)	North Carolina (31–9)	Texas Tech (36–12)	TCU (35–11)	Florida (38–14)	Louisville (46–9)	North Carolina (47-12)	Louisville (50–10)	Louisville (52–10)	TCU (50–18)	4.
5.	Oregon State	Oregon State (3–0)	Arizona (8–0)	Louisville (11–0)	Arizona (13–2)	Missouri (19–1)	St. John's (18–2)	Clemson (24–5)	North Carolina (26–6)	Clemson (30–6)	Clemson (33–8)	Auburn (32–14)	Texas Tech (39–13)	LSU (35–17)	North Carolina (44–11)	Louisville (47-10)	TCU (45–16)	TCU (47–16)	Louisville (53–12)	5.
6.	Vanderbilt	Vanderbilt (2–1)	Louisville (7–0)	LSU (9–3)	Florida State (13–3)	Cal State Fullerton (14–5)	Clemson (20–4)	North Carolina (22–6)	Texas Tech (28–7)	Texas Tech (31–8)	Texas Tech (33–10)	Kentucky (31–14)	Mississippi State (32–17)	TCU (36–13)	Texas Tech (42–13)	Stanford (40-14)	Long Beach State (41–18–1)	Florida State (45–21)	Florida State (46–23)	6.
7.	Arizona	Arizona (3–0)	North Carolina (7–0)	Virginia (11–1)	LSU (12–4)	Arizona (15–4)	North Carolina (18–6)	Texas Tech (25–6)	Arizona (23–8)	Arizona (26–9)	Mississippi State (28–14)	Mississippi State (30–16)	Florida (35–13)	Texas Tech (39–13)	TCU (39–14)	Texas Tech (43-15)	Kentucky (43–21)	Cal State Fullerton (39–22)	Cal State Fullerton (39–24)	7.
8.	Miami (FL)	Miami (FL) (2–1)	Virginia (7–0)	Florida State (9–2)	Florida (12–5)	LSU (16–5)	South Carolina (17–6)	Auburn (23–7)	Cal State Fullerton (21–10)	Cal State Fullerton (23–11)	Auburn (30–12)	TCU (31–11)	Kentucky (32–16)	Kentucky (36–16)	Stanford (37–14)	TCU (42-16)	Missouri State (43–18)	Texas A&M (41–21)	Texas A&M (41–23)	8.
9.	Florida State	Florida State (2–1)	Ole Miss (7–0)	St. John's (10–1)	St. John's (12–2)	St. John's (14–2)	Florida Gulf Coast (22–3)	Florida Gulf Coast (24–5)	Auburn (24–10)	Arkansas (29–8)	Kentucky (28–13)	Clemson (34–11)	Clemson (35–12)	Mississippi State (33–19)	Long Beach State (35–16–1)	Long Beach State (37-17-1)	Wake Forest (42–18)	Long Beach State (42–20–1)	Long Beach State (42–20–1)	9.
10.	Cal State Fullerton	Cal State Fullerton (2–1)	Florida State (5–2)	Baylor (11–1)	Baylor (14–2)	Oklahoma (21–3)	Auburn (20–6)	Florida (20–9)	LSU (22–11)	Auburn (27–11)	Arkansas (32–10)	Florida (30–13)	LSU (32–16)	Stanford (33–13)	Kentucky (38–18)	Kentucky (39-20)	Florida State (43–21)	Kentucky (43–23)	Kentucky (43–23)	10.
11.	Louisville	Louisville (3–0)	Texas A&M (6–1)	Texas A&M (9–3)	Texas A&M (14–3)	North Carolina (15–5)	Florida (16–9)	South Carolina (19–8)	Arkansas (25–8)	Kentucky (25–12)	St. John’s (29–5)	LSU (30–15)	Stanford (30–13)	Long Beach State (32–16–1)	Virginia (41–13)	Virginia (42-14)	Mississippi State (40–25)	Missouri State (43–20)	Missouri State (43–20)	11.
12.	Clemson	North Carolina (3–0)	Texas Tech (8–1)	Texas Tech (11–2)	Oklahoma (17–2)	Clemson (16–4)	Florida State (18–7)	Oklahoma (25–6)	St. John's (22–5)	LSU (25–12)	Virginia (33–10)	Long Beach State (28–14)	Long Beach State (30–15–1)	Missouri State (36–14)	Missouri State (37–15)	Missouri State (40-17)	Cal State Fullerton (37–21)	Wake Forest (43–20)	Wake Forest (43–20)	12.
13.	East Carolina	Virginia (3–0)	South Carolina (5–3)	Oklahoma (13–1)	North Carolina (12–4)	South Carolina (14–5)	LSU (18–7)	Arizona (20–7)	South Carolina (21–10)	St. John's (26–5)	Florida (27–13)	Stanford (27–12)	Missouri State (33–14)	Virginia (38–12)	Arkansas (39–15)	Arkansas (42-17)	Sam Houston State (44–21)	Mississippi State (40–27)	Mississippi State (40–27)	13.
14.	Louisiana–Lafayette	Ole Miss (3–0)	Vanderbilt (4–3)	North Carolina (9–3)	Clemson (12–3)	Michigan (15–4)	Cal State Fullerton (15–8)	Arkansas (22–6)	Oklahoma (27–8)	Mississippi State (25–13)	LSU (27–14)	Virginia (35–11)	Virginia (36–11)	Clemson (37–15)	Southern Miss (44–12)	Southern Miss (48-14)	Vanderbilt (36–23–1)	Sam Houston State (44–23)	Sam Houston State (44–23)	14.
15.	North Carolina	Texas A&M (3–0)	Cal State Fullerton (4–3)	Clemson (8–3)	Virginia (13–3)	Florida Gulf Coast (18–3)	Oklahoma (23–5)	Kentucky (21–8)	Mississippi State (22–12)	Virginia (29–9)	Maryland (28–11)	St. John's (31–7)	Arkansas (35–13)	Arkansas (37–14)	Arizona (36–17)	Arizona (37-19)	Texas A&M (39–21)	Vanderbilt (36–25–1)	Vanderbilt (36–25–1)	15.
16.	Virginia	Louisiana–Lafayette (1–1)	St. John's (7–0)	Dallas Baptist (8–3)	South Carolina (11–5)	Auburn (17–5)	Arizona (16–7)	Cal State Fullerton (17–10)	Kentucky (22–11)	Florida (24–12)	Long Beach St. (25–13)	Missouri State (30–13)	Auburn (32–17)	Kent State (33–14)	Wake Forest (38–17)	Wake Forest (39-18)	Davidson (35–24)	Davidson (35–26)	Davidson (35–26)	16.
17.	Long Beach State	Washington (2–1)	Baylor (8–0)	Stanford (9–3)	Michigan (12–3)	Florida (13–8)	Arkansas (20–5)	Southern Miss (24–5)	Virginia (26–8)	Wake Forest (28–10)	Arizona (26–12)	Arkansas (34–12)	Kent State (31–13)	Southern Mississippi (40–12)	Clemson (39–17)	Clemson (39-19)	North Carolina (49–14)	North Carolina (49–14)	North Carolina (49–14)	17.
18.	UC Santa Barbara	Sam Houston State (2–1)	Oklahoma (8–1)	South Carolina (7–5)	East Carolina (12–4)	Florida State (14–7)	Missouri (21–3)	Maryland (18–8)	Florida (21–11)	Maryland (24–11)	Cal State Fullerton (24–14)	Maryland (29–13)	BYU (29–14)	BYU (32–15)	Coastal Carolina (37–18–1)	Florida State (39-20)	Stanford (42–16)	Stanford (42–16)	Stanford (42–16)	18.
19.	Coastal Carolina	Arizona State (3–0)	Virginia Tech (7–1)	Michigan (9–3)	Vanderbilt (11–6)	Baylor (16–4)	Stanford (13–6)	Mississippi State (19–10)	Southern Miss (26–7)	San Diego (25–9)	Gonzaga (24–14)	Cal State Fullerton (26–15)	Arizona (31–15)	Arizona (33–17)	Kent State (35–16)	South Alabama (39-19)	Texas Tech (45–17)	Texas Tech (45–17)	Texas Tech (45–17)	19.
20.	Texas A&M	Texas Tech (3–1)	UCLA (4–2)	East Carolina (8–3)	Stanford (11–5)	Stanford (11–5)	Kentucky (18–7)	San Diego (19–6)	Vanderbilt (21–12)	Michigan (29–7)	Louisiana-Lafayette (26–14–1)	Wake Forest (30–13)	St. John's (34–8)	St. John's (37–8)	St. John's (40–9)	Dallas Baptist (40-19)	Dallas Baptist (42–21)	Dallas Baptist (42–21)	Dallas Baptist (42–21)	20.
21.	Washington	Long Beach State (1–2)	Miami (FL) (2–4)	Vanderbilt (7–5)	Cal State Fullerton (9–5)	Kentucky (15–6)	Virginia (19–6)	Wake Forest (21–8)	Maryland (20–10)	South Carolina (22–13)	South Carolina (24–15)	Kent State (27–13)	Southern Mississippi (37–12)	Cal State Fullerton (31–17)	Mississippi State (34–22)	St. John’s (42-11)	Virginia (43–16)	Virginia (43–16)	Virginia (43–16)	21.
22.	Ole Miss	Clemson (1–2)	Clemson (5–2)	Cal State Fullerton (5–4)	Florida Gulf Coast (14–3)	Virginia (15–5)	Vanderbilt (16–9)	LSU (19–10)	Wake Forest (23–10)	Southern Miss (28–9)	Vanderbilt (25–16)	BYU (25–14)	Cal State Fullerton (28–16)	Wake Forest (35–16)	Gonzaga (31–17)	Mississippi State (36-24)	Arkansas (45–19)	Arkansas (45–19)	Arkansas (45–19)	22.
23.	Sam Houston State	Dallas Baptist (2–1)	Dallas Baptist (5–2)	Coastal Carolina (9–5)	Missouri (15–1)	Ole Miss (14–6)	Southern Miss (19–5)	Virginia (21–8)	Oregon (21–8)	McNeese State (26–9)	Wake Forest (29–13)	Texas-Arlington (26–17)	Wake Forest (32–14)	Nebraska (32–17–1)	Nebraska (34–18–1)	Cal State Fullerton (34-21)	Southern Miss (50–16)	Southern Mississippi (50–16)	Southern Mississippi (50–16)	23.
24.	Stanford	Rice (2–2)	Texas (5–3)	Florida Gulf Coast (10–2)	Tennessee (11–2)	Vanderbilt (13–8)	Oregon (15–6)	Vanderbilt (18–11)	San Diego (21–9)	Long Beach State (22–12)	San Diego (27–11)	Vanderbilt (26–17)	Texas-Arlington (29–18)	Coastal Carolina (34–17–1)	Michigan (42–13)	Houston (40-19)	Arizona (38–21)	Arizona (38–21)	Arizona (38–21)	24.
25.	Arizona State	Texas (2–2)	Stanford (5–2)	Tennessee (9–1)	UC Irvine (9–5)	Southern Miss (16–4)	Houston (18–5)	Michigan (22–6)	Michigan (25–7)	West Virginia (21–13)	Michigan (31–9)	South Carolina (25–17)	Vanderbilt (29–18)	South Alabama (34–18)	Cal State Fullerton (33–19)	Florida Gulf Coast (42-18)	Clemson (42–21)	Clemson (42–21)	Clemson (42–21)	25.
26.	Dallas Baptist	UC Santa Barbara (1–2)	Oklahoma State (4–2)	Missouri (10–1)	San Diego (10–3)	San Diego (13–4)	Maryland (17–6)	Coastal Carolina (19–10)	Coastal Carolina (20–11–1)	Tennessee Tech (29–9)	West Virginia (23–15)	Michigan (33–10)	Nebraska (29–16–1)	Oklahoma (34–18)	South Alabama (36–19)	BYU (37-19)	South Alabama (40–21)	South Alabama (40–21)	South Alabama (40–21)	26.
27.	Rice	Coastal Carolina (1–2)	Arizona State (4–3)	Missouri State (10–1)	Texas (12–6)	UC Irvine (11–6)	Michigan (17–6)	UCF (22–7)	Connecticut (19–10)	Vanderbilt (22–5)	McNeese State (28–11)	Southern Mississippi (34–12)	Loyola Marymount (30–14)	Baylor (32–17)	Loyola Marymount (37–16)	Sam Houston State (40-20)	Houston (42–21)	Houston (42–21)	Houston (42–21)	27.
28.	Oklahoma State	Stanford (1–2)	Louisiana–Lafayette (3–3)	Louisiana–Lafayette (6–4)	Louisiana–Lafayette (9–4)	Oregon (13–5)	Wake Forest (18–7)	Oregon (17–8)	Missouri State (21–10)	Oregon (23–10)	Missouri State (27–13)	Florida Atlantic (29–13–1)	UCLA (24–20)	McNeese State (34–16)	Baylor (34–19)	Iowa (38-20)	Texas (39–24)	Texas (39–24)	Texas (39–24)	28.
29.	Texas Tech	Oklahoma State (1–1)	Washington (4–3)	Washington (7–4)	Oregon (11–4)	Arkansas (17–4)	Baylor (18–6)	Kent State (17–8)	Sam Houston State (23–9)	Coastal Carolina (22–13–1)	Stanford (23–12)	Texas A&M (32–13)	Coastal Carolina (30–16–1)	Michigan (39–12)	Dallas Baptist (36–19)	Nebraska (35-20-1)	Auburn (37–26)	Auburn (37–26)	Auburn (37–26)	29.
30.	Texas	NC State (2–1)	NC State (4–2)	Ole Miss (7–4)	Ole Miss (11–5)	Washington (12–6)	Long Beach State (13–9)	Connecticut (16–9)	Washington (18–12)	Washington (20–14)	Southern Miss (30–12)	Washington (24–17)	South Carolina (27–19)	South Carolina (30–21)	UCLA (28–23)	UCLA (30-25)	NC State (36–25)	NC State (36–25)	NC State (36–25)	30.
	Preseason Dec 19	Week 1 Feb 20	Week 2 Feb 27	Week 3 Mar 6	Week 4 Mar 13	Week 5 Mar 20	Week 6 Mar 27	Week 7 Apr 3	Week 8 Apr 10	Week 9 Apr 17	Week 10 Apr 24	Week 11 May 1	Week 12 May 8	Week 13 May 15	Week 14 May 22	Week 15 May 29	Week 16 June 6	Week 17 June 12	Final June 28	
		Dropped: 13. East Carolina	Dropped: 18. Sam Houston State; 21. Long Beach State; 24. Rice; 26. UC Santa Barbara; 27. Coastal Carolina	Dropped: 19. Virginia Tech; 20. UCLA; 21. Miami (FL); 24. Texas; 26. Oklahoma State; 27. Arizona State; 30. NC State	Dropped: 16. Dallas Baptist; 23. Coastal Carolina; 27. Missouri State; 29. Washington	Dropped: 11. Texas A&M; 18. East Carolina; 24. Tennessee; 27. Texas; 28. Louisiana–Lafayette	Dropped: 23. Ole Miss; 26. San Diego; 27. UC Irvine; 30.Washington	Dropped: 12. Florida State; 18. Missouri; 19. Stanford; 25. Houston; 29. Baylor; 30. Long Beach State	Dropped: 9. Florida Gulf Coast; 27. UCF; 29. Kent State	Dropped: 14. Oklahoma; 27. Connecticut; 28. Missouri State; 29. Sam Houston State	Dropped: 26. Tennessee Tech; 28. Oregon; 29. Coastal Carolina; 30. Washington	Dropped: 17. Arizona; 19. Gonzaga; 20. Louisiana-Lafayette; 24. San Diego; 26. West Virginia; 27. McNeese State	Dropped: 18. Maryland; 26. Michigan; 28. Florida Atlantic; 29. Texas A&M; 30. Washington	Dropped: 16. Auburn; 24. Texas-Arlington; 25. Vanderbilt; 27. Loyola Marymount; 28. UCLA	Dropped: 18. BYU; 26. Oklahoma; 28. McNeese State; 30. South Carolina	Dropped: No. 18 Coastal Carolina; No. 19 Kent State; No. 22 Gonzaga; No. 24 Michigan; No. 27 Loyola Marymount; No. 28 Baylor	Dropped: No. 21 St. John's; No. 25 Florida Gulf Coast; No. 26 BYU; No. 28 Iowa; No. 29 Nebraska; No. 30 UCLA	None	None	

The Preseason poll ranked the top 40 teams in the nation. Teams not listed above are: 31. NC State; 32. Michigan; 33. Nebraska; 34. Tulane; 35. Houston; 36. Southeastern Louisiana; 37. Gonzaga; 38. Georgia Tech; 39 Kent State; 40. Florida Atlantic.

== NCBWA ==
	Preseason Jan 31	Week 1 Feb 20	Week 2 Feb 27	Week 3 Mar 6	Week 4 Mar 13	Week 5 Mar 20	Week 6 Mar 27	Week 7 Apr 3	Week 8 Apr 10	Week 9 Apr 17	Week 10 Apr 24	Week 11 May 1	Week 12 May 8	Week 13 May 15	Week 14 May 22	Week 15 May 29	Week 16 Jun 7	Final Jun 28	
1.	TCU	TCU (3–0)	TCU (6–1)	TCU (10–1)	Louisville (15–0)	Louisville (19–0)	Oregon State (20–1)	Oregon State (24–1)	Oregon State (28–1)	Oregon State (30–2)	Oregon State (32–3)	Oregon State (34–4)	Oregon State (38–4)	Oregon State (41–4)	Oregon State (45–4)	Oregon State (49–4)	Oregon State (52–4)	Florida (52–19)	1.
2.	Florida	Florida (3–0)	Florida (6–1)	Florida (10–2)	Oregon State (14–1)	Oregon State (17–1)	Louisville (21–2)	Louisville (24–3)	Louisville (27–4)	Louisville (31–4)	Louisville (33–6)	Louisville (38–6)	Louisville (42–6)	Louisville (46–6)	North Carolina (44–11)	North Carolina (47–12)	LSU (45–17)	LSU (52–20)	2.
3.	LSU	LSU (3–0)	LSU (7–1)	Florida State (9–2)	TCU (12–3)	TCU (14–5)	Texas Tech (22–4)	TCU (22–5)	TCU (26–5)	North Carolina (29–7)	TCU (30–8)	North Carolina (36–9)	North Carolina (37–9)	North Carolina (41–10)	Florida (40–15)	LSU (42–17)	Louisville (50–10)	Oregon State (56–6)	3.
4.	Florida State	Florida State (2–1)	Oregon State (7–1)	Louisville (11–0)	Florida State (13–3)	Texas Tech (17–4)	TCU (17–5)	Clemson (24–5)	Clemson (28–5)	Clemson (30–6)	Clemson (33–8)	Texas Tech (36–12)	Texas Tech (39–13)	Texas Tech (39–13)	Texas Tech (42–13)	Florida (42–16)	Florida (45–17)	TCU (50–18)	4.
5.	South Carolina	Oregon State (4–0)	Florida State (5–2)	Oregon State (10–1)	Florida (12–5)	LSU (15–5)	Clemson (15–9)	North Carolina (22–6)	North Carolina (26–6)	Texas Tech (31–8)	North Carolina (31–9)	Kentucky (31–14)	TCU (35–11)	Florida (38–14)	Louisville (46–9)	Louisville (47–10)	TCU (45–16)	Louisville (53–12)	5.
6.	Vanderbilt	South Carolina (2–1)	Louisville (7–0)	Arizona (10–1)	Arizona (13–2)	Arizona (15–4)	South Carolina (17–6)	Texas Tech (25–6)	Texas Tech (28–7)	Arizona (26–9)	Texas Tech (33–10)	TCU (31–11)	Florida (35–13)	Kentucky (36–16)	LSU (39–17)	Texas Tech (43–15)	Long Beach State (41–18–1)	Florida State (46–23)	6.
7.	Oregon State	Vanderbilt (2–1)	South Carolina (5–3)	LSU (9–3)	LSU (12–4)	South Carolina (14–5)	LSU (17–7)	Florida (20–9)	Arizona (23–8)	TCU (28–7)	Kentucky (28–13)	Clemson (34–11)	Clemson (35–12)	TCU (36–13)	TCU (39–14)	TCU (42–16)	Kentucky (43–21)	Cal State Fullerton (39–24)	7.
8.	Louisville	Louisville (3–0)	North Carolina (7–0)	South Carolina (7–5)	Texas Tech (14–3)	Clemson (16–4)	North Carolina (18–6)	Arizona (20–7)	LSU (21–11)	LSU (24–12)	Virginia (33–10)	Auburn (32–14)	Virginia (36–11)	Virginia (38–12)	Kentucky (38–18)	Kentucky (39–20)	Wake Forest (42–18)	Texas A&M (41–23)	8.
9.	East Carolina	North Carolina (3–0)	Arizona (8–0)	Texas Tech (11–2)	South Carolina (11–5)	Cal State Fullerton (14–5)	Florida (15–9)	South Carolina (19–8)	Cal State Fullerton (21–10)	Cal State Fullerton (23–11)	Auburn (30–12)	Virginia (35–11)	Mississippi State (32–17)	LSU (34–17)	Virginia (41–13)	Stanford (40–14)	Cal State Fullerton (37–21)	Long Beach State (42–20–1)	9.
10.	NC State	NC State (2–1)	Virginia (7–0)	Clemson (8–3)	Baylor (14–2)	North Carolina (15–5)	Florida State (18–7)	Oklahoma (25–6)	Oklahoma (27–8)	Arkansas (29–8)	Arizona (26–12)	Florida (30–13)	Kentucky (32–16)	Long Beach State (32–16–1)	Long Beach State (35–16–1)	Virginia (42–14)	Florida State (43–21)	Kentucky (43–23)	10.
11.	Coastal Carolina	Cal State Fullerton (2–1)	Texas Tech (8–1)	Virginia (11–1)	Clemson (12–3)	Florida (13–8)	Arizona (16–7)	St. John's (21–2)	South Carolina (21–10)	Virginia (29–9)	Florida (27–13)	Long Beach State (28–14)	LSU (31–16)	Stanford (33–13)	Stanford (37–14)	Arkansas (42–17)	Missouri State (43–18)	Wake Forest (43–20)	11.
12.	North Carolina	Arizona (4–0)	Texas A&M (6–1)	Texas A&M (9–3)	Cal State Fullerton (9–5)	Florida State (14–7)	Florida Gulf Coast (14–10)	Kentucky (21–8)	Florida (21–11)	Kentucky (25–12)	Arkansas (32–10)	LSU (29–15)	Long Beach State (30–15–1)	Clemson (37–15)	Arkansas (39–15)	Long Beach State (37–17–1)	Mississippi State (40–25)	Missouri State (43–20)	12.
13.	Clemson	Virginia (3–0)	Ole Miss (7–0)	Stanford (9–3)	North Carolina (12–4)	St. John's (14–2)	St. John's (18–2)	Auburn (23–7)	Arkansas (25–8)	Florida (24–12)	Mississippi State (28–14)	Mississippi State (30–16)	Arizona (31–15)	Mississippi State (33–19)	Southern Miss (44–12)	Southern Miss (48–14)	Vanderbilt (36–23–1)	Mississippi State (40–27)	13.
14.	Cal State Fullerton	Alabama (2–1)	Cal State Fullerton (4–3)	Cal State Fullerton (5–4)	Texas A&M (14–3)	Baylor (16–4)	Cal State Fullerton (12–12)	Cal State Fullerton (17–10)	Virginia (26–8)	Auburn (27–11)	Long Beach State (25–13)	Arkansas (34–12)	Stanford (30–13)	Cal State Fullerton (31–17)	Arizona (36–17)	Wake Forest (39–18)	Sam Houston State (44–21)	North Carolina (49–14)	14.
15.	Louisiana–Lafayette	Texas A&M (3–0)	Vanderbilt (4–3)	North Carolina (9–3)	Virginia (13–3)	Oklahoma (21–3)	Oklahoma (23–5)	Arkansas (22–6)	Kentucky (22–11)	Michigan (29–7)	LSU (26–14)	Stanford (27–12)	Auburn (32–17)	Arizona (33–17)	Clemson (39–17)	Houston (40–19)	North Carolina (49–14)	Vanderbilt (36–25)	15.
16.	Arizona	Louisiana–Lafayette (1–1)	Stanford (5–2)	Georgia Tech (9–2)	Stanford (11–5)	Florida Gulf Coast (18–3)	Virginia (19–6)	LSU (18–10)	Auburn (24–10)	Mississippi State (25–13)	St. John's (29–5)	Cal State Fullerton (26–15)	Cal State Fullerton (28–16)	Arkansas (37–14)	Cal State Fullerton (33–19)	Arizona (37–19)	Davidson (35–24)	Sam Houston State (44–23)	16.
17.	Texas Tech	Miami (FL) (2–1)	Clemson (5–2)	Louisiana–Lafayette (6–4)	St. John's (12–2)	Ole Miss (14–6)	Stanford (13–6)	Florida Gulf Coast (24–5)	Southern Miss (26–7)	Long Beach State (22–12)	Cal State Fullerton (24–14)	Arizona (27–15)	Arkansas (35–13)	Southern Miss (40–12)	Wake Forest (38–17)	Clemson (39–19)	Texas A&M (39–21)	Southern Miss (50–16)	17.
18.	Miami (FL)	Texas Tech (3–1)	St. John's (7–0)	Ole Miss (7–4)	East Carolina (12–4)	Missouri (19–1)	Kentucky (18–7)	Southern Miss (24–5)	Michigan (25–7)	Wake Forest (28–10)	Michigan (31–9)	Texas A&M (32–13)	St. John's (34–8)	Michigan (39–12)	Michigan (42–13)	Florida State (39–20)	Texas Tech (45–17)	Texas Tech (45–17)	18.
19.	Virginia	Coastal Carolina (1–3)	Georgia Tech (6–1)	East Carolina (8–3)	Louisiana–Lafayette (9–4)	Stanford (11–5)	Auburn (20–6)	Michigan (22–6)	St. John's (22–5)	St. John's (26–5)	Wake Forest (29–13)	Michigan (33–10)	Wake Forest (32–14)	St. John's (37–8)	St. John's (40–9)	Cal State Fullerton (34–21)	Stanford (42–16)	Davidson (35–26)	19.
20.	Texas A&M	Clemson (1–2)	Arkansas (6–0)	St. John's (10–1)	Oklahoma (17–2)	Virginia (15–5)	Arkansas (20–5)	Florida State (18–11)	Long Beach State (20–11)	Southern Miss (28–9)	Stanford (23–12)	Wake Forest (30–13)	Michigan (35–11)	Wake Forest (35–16)	Mississippi State (34–22)	Mississippi State (36–24)	Texas (39–24)	Stanford (42–16)	20.
21.	UC Santa Barbara	Ole Miss (3–0)	Coastal Carolina (4–4)	Coastal Carolina (9–5)	Coastal Carolina (11–7)	Michigan (15–4)	Baylor (18–6)	Wake Forest (21–8)	Mississippi State (22–12)	Oklahoma (27–12)	Houston (27–12)	St. John's (31–7)	Southern Miss (37–12)	Missouri State (36–14)	Missouri State (37–15)	Missouri State (40–17)	Southern Miss (50–16)	Arkansas (45–19)	21.
22.	Oklahoma State	Stanford (1–2)	Houston (5–2)	NC State (6–5)	Michigan (12–3)	Louisiana–Lafayette (11–6)	Missouri (21–3)	Virginia (21–8)	Stanford (17–10)	Houston (25–10)	Mercer (35–7)	Southern Miss (34–12)	Texas A&M (34–15)	Oklahoma (34–18)	Houston (36–19)	Michigan (42–15)	Arkansas (45–19)	Virginia (43–16)	22.
23.	Stanford	UNC Wilmington (3–0)	Oklahoma (8–1)	Baylor (11–1)	Louisiana Tech (13–2)	South Florida (19–1)	Ole Miss (15–9)	Stanford (14–9)	Houston (23–8)	South Carolina (22–13)	Texas A&M (28–13)	USF (34–10)	USF (37–10)	USF (39–12)	Nebraska (34–18–1)	St. John's (42–11)	Virginia (43–16)	Texas (39–24)	23.
24.	Rice	Washington (2–1)	Utah (5–2)	Houston (7–3)	Florida Gulf Coast (14–3)	Auburn (17–5)	Houston (18–5)	San Diego (19–6)	Wake Forest (23–10)	West Virginia (21–13)	Maryland (28–11)	Maryland (29–13)	Missouri State (33–14)	Texas A&M (35–17)	Oklahoma (34–20)	UCF (40–20)	Clemson (42–21)	Clemson (42–21)	24.
25.	Maryland	Georgia Tech (3–0)	Mississippi State (6–3)	Louisiana Tech (11–1)	San Diego (10–3)	San Diego (13–4)	South Florida (22–3)	Houston (20–7)	South Florida (27–5)	Texas A&M (26–11)	West Virginia (23–15)	Missouri State (30–13)	Houston (30–17)	Auburn (32–21)	UCF (38–18)	Texas (37–22)	Houston (42–21)	Houston (42–21)	25.
26.	Washington	Rice (2–2)	UCF (7–0)	Vanderbilt (7–5)	Ole Miss (11–5)	UCF (17–4)	Michigan (17–6)	South Florida (24–5)	Oregon (21–8)	San Diego (25–9)	USF (32–8)	Texas (30–16)	Oklahoma (32–17)	Houston (33–18)	Auburn (34–22)	Nebraska (35–20–1)	Arizona (38–21)	Arizona (38–21)	26.
27.	Ole Miss	Mississippi State (2–1)	Texas (5–3)	Dallas Baptist (8–3)	UCF (14–3)	Kentucky (15–6)	Southern Miss (19–5)	Long Beach State (16–11)	San Diego (21–9)	Mercer (32–6)	South Carolina (24–15)	West Virginia (25–17)	Loyola Marymount (30–14)	Baylor (32–17)	Florida State (35–20)	Auburn (35–24)	Auburn (37–26)	Auburn (37–26)	27.
28.	Long Beach State	UCLA (2–0)	Washington (4–3)	Washington (7–4)	Missouri (15–1)	Arkansas(17–4)	Louisiana–Lafayette (13–9)	Maryland (18–8)	Florida State (21–13)	Oregon (23–10)	Southern Miss (30–12)	Houston (28–15)	Maryland (31–15)	Nebraska (32–17–1)	Texas A&M (36–20)	Oklahoma (34–22)	Dallas Baptist (42–21)	Dallas Baptist (42–21)	28.
29.	Georgia Tech	Houston (3–0)	UC Santa Barbara (4–3)	Oklahoma (13–1)	Vanderbilt (11–6)	Texas A&M (14–7)	Wake Forest (18–7)	Baylor (19–9)	Florida Gulf Coast (25–9)	Stanford (19–12)	San Diego (27–11)	Loyola Marymount (30–14)	Vanderbilt (29–18)	UCF (36–16)	Coastal Carolina (37–18)	Florida Gulf Coast (42–18)	NC State (36–25)	NC State (36–25)	29.
30.	UNC Wilmington	Oklahoma State (1–1)	Oklahoma State (4–3)	Arkansas (8–3)	Tennessee (11–2)	Oklahoma State (14–6)	San Diego (15–6)	Mississippi State (19–10)	Vanderbilt (21–12)	USF (29–7)	Louisiana (26–14–1)	Florida Atlantic (29–13–1)	Texas (31–19)	Old Dominion (35–16)	Baylor (34–19)	Dallas Baptist (40–19)	Bethune-Cookman (36–25)	Bethune-Cookman (36–25)	30.
	Preseason Jan 31	Week 1 Feb 20	Week 2 Feb 27	Week 3 Mar 6	Week 4 Mar 13	Week 5 Mar 20	Week 6 Mar 27	Week 7 Apr 3	Week 8 Apr 10	Week 9 Apr 17	Week 10 Apr 24	Week 11 May 1	Week 12 May 8	Week 13 May 15	Week 14 May 22	Week 15 May 29	Week 16 Jun 7	Final Jun 28	
		Dropped: 9. East Carolina; 21. UC Santa Barbara; 25. Maryland; 28. Long Beach State	Dropped: 10. NC State; 14. Alabama; 16. Louisiana–Lafayette; 17. Miami (FL); 23. UNC Wilmington; 26. Rice; 28. UCLA	Dropped: 24. Utah; 25. Mississippi State; 26. UCF; 27. Texas; 28. Rice; 30. UC Santa Barbara	Dropped: 16. Georgia Tech; 22. NC State; 24. Houston; 27. Dallas Baptist; 28. Washington; 30. Arkansas	Dropped: 18. East Carolina; 21. Coastal Carolina; 23. Louisiana Tech; 29. Vanderbilt; 30. Tennessee	Dropped: 26. UCF; 29. Texas A&M; 30. Oklahoma State	Dropped: 22. Missouri; 23. Ole Miss; 28. Louisiana–Lafayette	Dropped: 28. Maryland; 29. Baylor	Dropped: No. 28 Florida State; No. 29 Florida Gulf Coast; No. 30 Vanderbilt	Dropped: No. 21 Oklahoma; No. 28 Oregon	Dropped: No. 22 Mercer; No. 27 South Carolina; No. 29 San Diego; No. 30 Louisiana	Dropped: No. 27 West Virginia; No. 30 Florida Atlantic	Dropped: No. 27 Loyola Marymount; No. 28 Maryland; No. 29 Vanderbilt; No. 30 Texas	Dropped: No. 23 USF; No. 30 Old Dominion	Dropped: No. 28 Texas A&M; No. 29 Coastal Carolina; No. 30 Baylor	Dropped: No. 18 Michigan; No. 19 St. John's; No. 23 Nebraska; No. 24 Oklahoma; No. 25 UCF; No. 29 Coastal Carolina; No. 30 Baylor	None	

The Preseason poll ranked the top 35 teams in the nation. Teams not listed above are: 31. Dallas Baptist; 32. Mississippi State; 33. Tulane; 34. Houston; 35. Arizona State.
