= Rick Vanderhook =

American college baseball coach (born 1961)

Biographical details
- Born: May 13, 1961 (age 65); Lakewood, California, U.S.
- Education: Trinity University

Playing career
- 1981–1982: Cerritos
- 1983–1984: Cal State Fullerton
- Position: Infielder

Coaching career (HC unless noted)
- 1985–1988: Cal State Fullerton (asst.)
- 1989–1990: Cal State Northridge (asst.)
- 1991–2007: Cal State Fullerton (asst.)
- 2009–2011: UCLA (asst.)
- 2012–2021: Cal State Fullerton

Head coaching record
- Overall: 318–223
- Tournaments: 17–14 (NCAA)

Accomplishments and honors

Championships
- College World Series (1984); 5× Big West Conference regular season (2012, 2013, 2015, 2016, 2018)

Awards
- 5× Big West Coach of the Year (2012, 2013, 2015, 2016, 2018)

Richard Dean Vanderhook (born May 13, 1961) is an American former college baseball coach and infielder. He played college baseball at Cerritos College for head coach George Horton from 1982 to 1983 prior to transferring to Cal State Fullerton where he played for head coach Augie Garrido from 1983 to 1984. Vanderhook helped Cal State Fullerton's 1984 national championship team.

Following his playing career, Vanderhook became an assistant coach at Cal State Fullerton from 1985–1988, Cal State Northridge Matadors from 1989–1990, Cal State Fullerton again from 1991–2007, and UCLA Bruins from 2009–2011.

He completed his bachelor's degree in physical education at Trinity University in 2003. Vanderhook retired from coaching on June 7, 2021.

== Head coaching record ==
Record table
Season	Team	Overall	Conference	Standing	Postseason
Cal State Fullerton Titans (Big West Conference) (2012–2021)
2012	Cal State Fullerton	36–21	17–7	1st	NCAA Regional
2013	Cal State Fullerton	51–10	23–4	1st	NCAA Super Regional
2014	Cal State Fullerton	34–24	14–10	4th	NCAA Regional
2015	Cal State Fullerton	39–25	19–5	1st	College World Series
2016	Cal State Fullerton	36–23	17–7	1st	NCAA Regional
2017	Cal State Fullerton	39–24	15–9	3rd	College World Series
2018	Cal State Fullerton	32–23	18–6	1st	NCAA Super Regional
2019	Cal State Fullerton	27–26	13–11	4th	
2020	Cal State Fullerton	4–12	0–0		Season canceled due to COVID-19
2021	Cal State Fullerton	20–35	13–23	9th	
Total:		318–223			
National champion Postseason invitational champion Conference regular season champion Conference regular season and conference tournament champion Division regular season champion Division regular season and conference tournament champion Conference tournament champion
