= 2017 Oregon State Beavers baseball team =

American college baseball season

2017 Oregon State Beavers baseball

Corvallis Super Regional champions Corvallis Regional champions Pac-12 regular season champions

College World Series, 2–2
- Conference: Pac-12 Conference

Ranking
- Coaches: No. 3
- CB: No. 3
- Record: 56–6 (27–3 Pac-12)
- Head coach: Pat Casey (23rd season)
- Assistant coaches: Pat Bailey (10th season); Nate Yeskie (9th season); Andy Jenkins (5th season)
- Home stadium: Goss Stadium at Coleman Field

2017 Pac-12 Conference baseball standings
	Conf.				Overall
Team	W		L	PCT	W		L	PCT
No. 3 Oregon State ‍†‍‍^{y}	27	–	3	.900	56	–	6	.903
No. 18 Stanford ‍‍‍^{y}	21	–	9	.700	42	–	16	.724
UCLA ‍‍‍^{y}	19	–	11	.633	30	–	27	.526
No. 24 Arizona ‍‍‍^{y}	16	–	14	.533	38	–	21	.644
California ‍‍‍	15	–	15	.500	25	–	29	.463
Utah ‍‍‍	15	–	15	.500	27	–	24	.529
Washington ‍‍‍	14	–	16	.467	28	–	26	.519
Oregon ‍‍‍	12	–	18	.400	30	–	25	.545
Washington State ‍‍‍	10	–	20	.333	24	–	29	.453
Arizona State ‍‍‍	8	–	22	.267	23	–	32	.418
USC ‍‍‍	8	–	22	.267	21	–	34	.382
† – Conference champion y – Invited to the NCAA tournament Rankings from Collegiate Baseball

The 2017 Oregon State Beavers baseball team represented Oregon State University in the 2017 NCAA Division I baseball season. The Beavers played their home games at Goss Stadium at Coleman Field and were members of the Pac-12 Conference. The team was coached by Pat Casey in his 23rd season at Oregon State. The Beavers finished the regular season with the best record in the history of the program at 49–4, and set the Pac-12 record for conference victories in a season with 27. They were awarded the #1 overall national seed in the NCAA baseball tournament for the second time in team history (2014).

== Schedule and results ==
Legend
	Oregon State win
	Oregon State loss
	Postponement
**Bold**	Oregon State team member

2017 Oregon State Beavers baseball game log (56–6)
Regular season (49–4)

February (7–1)
Date	Opponent	Rank	Site/stadium	Score	Win	Loss	Save	Attendance	Overall record	Pac-12 Record
Sanderson Ford College Baseball Classic
Feb 17	vs. Indiana*	No. 5	Surprise Stadium • Surprise, AZ	**W** 1–0	**Thompson (1–0)**	Stiever (0–1)	**Engelbrekt (1)**	1,733	1–0	–
Feb 17	vs. Duke*	No. 5	Surprise Stadium • Surprise, AZ	**W** 6–3	**Fehmel (1–0)**	Stallings (0–1)	**Verburg (1)**	2,149	2–0	–
Feb 19	vs. Duke*	No. 5	Surprise Stadium • Surprise, AZ	**W** 11–2	**Tweedt (1–0)**	Day (0–1)	**Gambrell (1)**	1,893	3–0	–
Feb 20	vs. Indiana*	No. 5	Surprise Stadium • Surprise, AZ	**W** 4–1	**Thompson (2–0)**	Hobbie (0–1)	**Engelbrekt (2)**	2,216	4–0	–
Big 10–Pac-12 Spring Training College Baseball Classic
Feb 23	vs. Nebraska*	No. 5	Surprise Stadium • Surprise, AZ	**W** 10–1	**Heimlich (1–0)**	Waldron (0–2)	None	2,862	5–0	–
Feb 24	vs. Ohio State*	No. 5	Surprise Stadium • Surprise, AZ	**L** 1–6	Pavlopoulos (1–0)	**Fehmel (1–1)**	None	2,071	5–1	–
Feb 25	vs. Nebraska*	No. 5	Surprise Stadium • Surprise, AZ	**W** 5–2	**Tweedt (2–0)**	Meyers (0–1)	**Engelbrekt (3)**	2,841	6–1	–
Feb 26	vs. Ohio State*	No. 5	Surprise Stadium • Surprise, AZ	**W** 5–1	**Thompson (3–0)**	Post (0–1)	None	1,731	7–1	–

March (15–0)
Date	Opponent	Rank	Site/stadium	Score	Win	Loss	Save	Attendance	Overall record	Pac-12 Record
Mar 4	UC Davis*	No. 4	Goss Stadium at Coleman Field • Corvallis, OR	**W** 4–0	Heimlich (2–0)	Garcia (0–1)	None	2,622	8–1	–
Mar 4	UC Davis*	No. 4	Goss Stadium at Coleman Field • Corvallis, OR	**W** 14–2	Tweedt (3–0)	Razo (2–1)	None	2,578	9–1	–
Mar 5	UC Davis*	No. 4	Goss Stadium at Coleman Field • Corvallis, OR	**W** 4–1	Mulholland (1–0)	Mullins (0–1)	None	2,535	10–1	–
Mar 9	Ball State*	No. 3	Goss Stadium at Coleman Field • Corvallis, OR	**W** 2–0	Fehmel (2–1)	Korson (0–1)	**Engelbrekt (4)**	2,441	11–1	–
Mar 10	Ball State*	No. 3	Goss Stadium at Coleman Field • Corvallis, OR	**W** 5–0	Heimlich (3–0)	Butler (1–2)	None		12–1	–
Mar 10	Ball State*	No. 3	Goss Stadium at Coleman Field • Corvallis, OR	**W** 5–1	Gambrell (1–0)	Marquardt (2–2)	**Mulholland (1)**	2,949	13–1	–
Mar 11	Ball State*	No. 3	Goss Stadium at Coleman Field • Corvallis, OR	**W** 8–4	Thompson (4–0)	Marnon (2–2)	None	2,615	14–1	–
Mar 16	at Arizona State	No. 1	Phoenix Municipal Stadium • Phoenix, AZ	**W** 2–0	Heimlich (4–0)	Lingos (3–1)	**Engelbrekt (5)**	6,010	15–1	1–0
Mar 17	at Arizona State	No. 1	Phoenix Municipal Stadium • Phoenix, AZ	**W** 10–1	Fehmel (3–1)	Van Scoyoc (0–1)	None	2,704	16–1	2–0
Mar 18	at Arizona State	No. 1	Phoenix Municipal Stadium • Phoenix, AZ	**W** 4–1	Thompson (5–0)	Erives (0–1)	None	2,661	17–1	3–0
Mar 24	No. 7 Arizona	No. 1	Goss Stadium at Coleman Field • Corvallis, OR	**W** 4–3	Mulholland (2–0)	Megill (0–2)	None	2,790	18–1	4–0
Mar 25	No. 7 Arizona	No. 1	Goss Stadium at Coleman Field • Corvallis, OR	**W** 5–4	Engelbrekt (1–0)	Deason (1–1)	None	3,190	19–1	5–0
Mar 26	No. 7 Arizona	No. 1	Goss Stadium at Coleman Field • Corvallis, OR	**W** 11–7	Eisert (1–0)	Gomez (2–3)	None	2,981	20–1	6–0
Mar 28	at Saint Mary's*	No. 1	Louis Guisto Field • Moraga, CA	**W** 4–3	Engelbrekt (2–0)	Milam (1–1)	**Mulholland (2)**	550	21–1	6–0
Mar 31	at No. 19 Stanford	No. 1	Klein Field at Sunken Diamond • Stanford, CA	**W** 3–1	Heimlich (5–0)	Bubic (2–4)	None	1,653	22–1	7–0

April (12–3)
Date	Opponent	Rank	Site/stadium	Score	Win	Loss	Save	Attendance	Overall record	PAC-12 Record
Apr 1	at No. 19 Stanford	No. 1	Klein Field at Sunken Diamond • Stanford, CA	**W** 15–7	**Eisert (2–0)**	Thorne (1–1)	None	1,867	23–1	8–0
Apr 2	at No. 19 Stanford	No. 1	Klein Field at Sunken Diamond • Stanford, CA	**W** 7–0	**Thompson (6–0)**	Castellanos (4–1)	None	1,867	24–1	9–0
Apr 4	at Portland*	No. 1	Joe Etzel Field • Portland, OR	**W** 4–3	**Eisert (3–0)**	Miller (1–5)	**Mulholland (3)**	1,300	25–1	9–0
Apr 7	Utah	No. 1	Goss Stadium at Coleman Field • Corvallis, OR	**W** 5–4	**Mulholland (3–0)**	Drachler (0–2)	None	2,912	26–1	10–0
Apr 8	Utah	No. 1	Goss Stadium at Coleman Field • Corvallis, OR	**W** 5–4 (16)	{**Mullholland (4–0)**	Bauerle (0–1)	None	3,284	27–1	11–0
Apr 9	Utah	No. 1	Goss Stadium at Coleman Field • Corvallis, OR	**W** 5–1	**Thompson (7–0)**	Lapiana (2–4)	**Hickey (1)**	3,250	28–1	12–0
Apr 13	at No. 30 Washington	No. 1	Husky Ballpark • Seattle, WA	**L** 2–3	Bremer (4–2)	**Heimlich (5–1)**	None	1,136	28–2	12–1
Apr 14	at No. 30 Washington	No. 1	Husky Ballpark • Seattle, WA	**W** 5–2	**Fehmel (4–1)**	Nierenberg (1–2)	**Mulholland (4)**	2,478	29–2	13–1
Apr 15	at No. 30 Washington	No. 1	Husky Ballpark • Seattle, WA	**W** 3–0	**Thompson (3–0)**	DeMers (3–3)	**Mullholland (5)**	2,690	30–2	14–1
Apr 21	at UCLA	No. 1	Jackie Robinson Stadium • Los Angeles, CA	**W** 4–2 (10)	**Mulholland (5–0)**	Bird (4–1)	None	1,209	31–2	15–1
Apr 22	at UCLA	No. 1	Jackie Robinson Stadium • Los Angeles, CA	**L** 1–7	Ceja (2–3)	**Fehmel (4–2)**	None	1,475	31–3	15–2
Apr 23	at UCLA	No. 1	Jackie Robinson Stadium • Los Angeles, CA	**W** 2–1	**Verburg (1–0)**	Bird (4–2)	**Eisert (1)**	1,377	32–3	16–2
Apr 25	Oregon*	No. 1	Goss Stadium at Coleman Field • Corvallis, OR	Postponed to May 2						
Apr 28	USC	No. 1	Goss Stadium at Coleman Field • Corvallis, OR	**W** 3–1	**Heimlich (3–1)**	Stubbs (0–3)	**Rasmussen (1)**	3,367	33–3	17–2
Apr 29	USC	No. 1	Goss Stadium at Coleman Field • Corvallis, OR	**L** 5–7 (10)	Manning (2–1)	**Mulholland (5–1)**	None	3,420	33–4	17–3
Apr 30	USC	No. 1	Goss Stadium at Coleman Field • Corvallis, OR	**W** 10–1	**Thompson (9–0)**	Crouse (2–6)	None	3,351	34–4	18–3

May (15–0)
Date	Opponent	Rank	Site/stadium	Score	Win	Loss	Save	Attendance	Overall record	PAC-12 Record
May 2	Oregon*	No. 1	Goss Stadium at Coleman Field • Corvallis, OR	**W** 4–1	Britton (1–0)	Nelson (0–1)	**Eisert (2)**	3,316	35–4	18–3
May 5	California	No. 1	Goss Stadium at Coleman Field • Corvallis, OR	**W** 8–0	Heimlich (7–1)	Horn (4-4)	None	3,423	36–4	19–3
May 6	California	No. 1	Goss Stadium at Coleman Field • Corvallis, OR	**W** 11–10	Rasmussen (1–0)	Sabouri (1–3)	None	3,593	37–4	20–3
May 7	California	No. 1	Goss Stadium at Coleman Field • Corvallis, OR	**W** 10–2	Thompson (10–0)	Ladrech (2–2)	None	3,551	38–4	21–3
May 11	at Oregon	No. 1	PK Park • Eugene, OR	**W** 6–1	Heimlich (8–1)	Stringer (4–2)	**Eisert (4)**	2,209	39–4	22–3
May 12	at Oregon	No. 1	PK Park • Eugene, OR	**W** 5–4	Engelbrekt (3–0)	Peterson (10–3)	**Verburg (2)**	2,834	40–4	23–3
May 13	at Oregon	No. 1	PK Park • Eugene, OR	**W** 1–0	Thompson (11–0)	Mercer (5–6)	**Eisert (4)**	3,517	41–4	24–3
May 16	vs. Portland*	No. 1	Volcanoes Stadium • Keizer, OR	**W** 7–1	Mulholland (6–1)	Budnick (1-9)	None	3,906	42–4	24–3
May 19	Washington State	No. 1	Goss Stadium at Coleman Field • Corvallis, OR	**W** 4–3	Heimlich (9–1)	Sunitsch (2–4)	None	3,583	43–4	25–3
May 20	Washington State	No. 1	Goss Stadium at Coleman Field • Corvallis, OR	**W** 5–0	Thompson (12–0)	Anderson (5-3)	None	3,654	44–4	26–3
May 21	Washington State	No. 1	Goss Stadium at Coleman Field • Corvallis, OR	**W** 14–3	Rasmussen (2–0)	Block (0-3)	None	3,629	45–4	27–3
May 25	Abilene Christian*	No. 1	Goss Stadium at Coleman Field • Corvallis, OR	**W** 9–0	Heimlich (10–1)	Lambright (0–4)	None	3,432	46–4	27–3
May 26	Abilene Christian*	No. 1	Goss Stadium at Coleman Field • Corvallis, OR	**W** 5–4 (11)	Eisert (4–0)	Watkins (0–1)	None	3,605	47–4	27–3
May 27	Abilene Christian*	No. 1	Goss Stadium at Coleman Field • Corvallis, OR	**W** 11–0 (7)	Rasmussen (3–0)	Ruot (0–5)	None	3,563	48–4	27–3
May 28	Abilene Christian*	No. 1	Goss Stadium at Coleman Field • Corvallis, OR	**W** 4–2	Britton (2–0)	Skeffington (1–6)	**Mulholland (7)**	3,547	49–4	27–3

Postseason (7–2)

Corvallis Regional (3–0)
Date	Opponent	Seed/Rank	Site/stadium	Score	Win	Loss	Save	Attendance	Overall record	NCAAT record
June 2	(4) Holy Cross*	(1) No. 1	Goss Stadium at Coleman Field • Corvallis, OR	**W** 8–2	**Thompson (13–0)**	King (5–7)	None	3,508	50–4	1–0
June 3	(3) Yale*	(1) No. 1	Goss Stadium at Coleman Field • Corvallis, OR	**W** 11–0	**Heimlich (11–1)**	Brodkowitz (6–3)	None	3,474	51–4	2–0
June 4	(3) Yale*	(1) No. 1	Goss Stadium at Coleman Field • Corvallis, OR	**W** 8–1	**Eisert (5–0)**	Espig (1–1)	None	3,456	52–4	3–0

Corvallis Super Regional (2–0)
Date	Opponent	Rank	Site/stadium	Score	Win	Loss	Save	Attendance	Overall record	NCAAT record
June 9	No. 14 Vanderbilt*	(1) No. 1	Goss Stadium at Coleman Field • Corvallis, OR	**W** 8–4	**Thompson (14–0)**	Raby (10–4)	**Tweedt (1)**	3,737	53–4	4–0
June 10	No. 14 Vanderbilt*	(1) No. 1	Goss Stadium at Coleman Field • Corvallis, OR	**W** 9–2	**Fehmel (5–2)**	Wright (5–6)	None	3,734	54–4	5–0

College World Series (2–2)
Date	Opponent	Rank	Site/stadium	Score	Win	Loss	Save	Attendance	Overall record	CWS record
June 17	No. 7 Cal State Fullerton*	(1) No. 1	TD Ameritrade Park • Omaha, NE	**W** 6–5	**Mulholland (7–1)**	Workman (6–3)	**Rasmussen (2)**	22,656	55–4	1–0
June 19	(4) No. 2 LSU*	(1) No. 1	TD Ameritrade Park • Omaha, NE	**W** 13–1	**Fehmel (6–2)**	Walker (8–2)	None	24,874	56–4	2–0
June 23	(4) No. 2 LSU	(1) No. 1	TD Ameritrade Park • Omaha, NE	**L** 1–3	Lange (10–5)	**Thompson (14–1)**	Hess (4)	21,257	56–5	2–1
June 24	(4) No. 2 LSU	(1) No. 1	TD Ameritrade Park • Omaha, NE	**L** 1–6	Gilbert (7–1)	**Fehmel (6–3)**	None	15,618	56–6	2–2

== Rankings ==
Ranking movements Legend: ██ Increase in ranking ██ Decrease in ranking ( ) = First-place votes
	Week																
Poll	Pre	1	2	3	4	5	6	7	8	9	10	11	12	13	14	15	Final
Coaches'	7	7*	7*	4	2 (5)	2 (12)	1	1	1	1	1	1	1	1	1	1	3
Baseball America	9	8	8	5	4	2	1	1	1	1	1	1	1	1	1	1	3
Collegiate Baseball^	5	5	4	3	1	1	1	1	1	1	1	1	1	1	1	1	3
NCBWA†	7	5	4	5	2	2	1	1	1	1	1	1	1	1	1	1	3

^ Collegiate Baseball ranked 40 teams in their preseason poll, but only ranked 30 teams weekly during the season.
† NCBWA ranks 30 teams in their preseason poll, but only ranks 25 teams weekly during the season.
* A new poll was not released for this week, so for comparison purposes, the previous week's ranking is inserted in this week's slot.
