= 2017 UCLA Bruins baseball team =

American college baseball season

2017 UCLA Bruins baseball

NCAA tournament, Long Beach Regional
- Conference: Pac-12 Conference
- Record: 30–27 (19–11 Pac-12)
- Head coach: John Savage (13th season)
- Hitting coach: Bryant Ward (2rd season)
- Pitching coach: Rex Peters (6th season)
- Home stadium: Jackie Robinson Stadium (Capacity: 1,820)

2017 Pac-12 Conference baseball standings
	Conf.				Overall
Team	W		L	PCT	W		L	PCT
No. 3 Oregon State ‍†‍‍^{y}	27	–	3	.900	56	–	6	.903
No. 18 Stanford ‍‍‍^{y}	21	–	9	.700	42	–	16	.724
UCLA ‍‍‍^{y}	19	–	11	.633	30	–	27	.526
No. 24 Arizona ‍‍‍^{y}	16	–	14	.533	38	–	21	.644
California ‍‍‍	15	–	15	.500	25	–	29	.463
Utah ‍‍‍	15	–	15	.500	27	–	24	.529
Washington ‍‍‍	14	–	16	.467	28	–	26	.519
Oregon ‍‍‍	12	–	18	.400	30	–	25	.545
Washington State ‍‍‍	10	–	20	.333	24	–	29	.453
Arizona State ‍‍‍	8	–	22	.267	23	–	32	.418
USC ‍‍‍	8	–	22	.267	21	–	34	.382
† – Conference champion y – Invited to the NCAA tournament Rankings from Collegiate Baseball

The 2017 UCLA Bruins baseball team represented the University of California, Los Angeles in the 2017 NCAA Division I baseball season as a member of the Pac-12 Conference. The team was coached by John Savage and played their home games at Jackie Robinson Stadium.

== Previous season ==
The Bruins finished 25–31 overall, and 12–18 in the conference. The Bruins were not invited to the NCAA Division I tournament.

=== MLB Draft Selections ===
The Bruins had six individuals selected in the 2016 MLB draft.

Player	Position	Round	Overall	MLB Team
Grant Dyer	Pitcher	8	227	Philadelphia Phillies
Luke Persico	Outfielder	12	352	Oakland Athletics
Dominic Miroglio	Catcher	16	480	Tampa Bay Rays
Eric Filia	Right fielder	20	597	Seattle Mariners
Kort Peterson	Outfielder	23	703	Kansas City Royals
Chris Bono	Center fielder	37	1115	San Francisco Giants

== Roster ==
2017 UCLA Bruins baseball team
Players
Coaches

#	Pos.	Name	B/T	Height	Weight	Year	Previous school	Home town
1	OF	Jordan Myrow (redshirt)	R/R	5 ft 11 in (1.8 m)	185 lb (84 kg)	RS Fr	Notre Dame High School	Los Angeles, California
3	INF	Ryan Kreidler	R/R	6 ft 2 in (1.88 m)	195 lb (88 kg)	Fr	Davis High School	Davis, California
4	INF	Nick Valaika (redshirt)	R/R	5 ft 11 in (1.8 m)	186 lb (84 kg)	RS So	Hart High School	Valencia, California
5	INF	Sean Bouchard	R/R	6 ft 3 in (1.91 m)	215 lb (98 kg)	Jr	Cathedral Catholic High School	San Diego, California
6	INF	Jack Stronach	R/R	6 ft 3 in (1.91 m)	195 lb (88 kg)	Fr	Helix High School	La Mesa, California
7	INF	Michael Toglia	S/L	6 ft 5 in (1.96 m)	201 lb (91 kg)	Fr	Gig Harbor High School	Gig Harbor, Washington
8	OF	Jarron Silva	L/L	5 ft 10 in (1.78 m)	175 lb (79 kg)	Fr	Saint Mary's High School	Stockton, California
9	OF	Brett Stephens	L/R	6 ft 0 in (1.83 m)	197 lb (89 kg)	Sr	Campolindo High School	Moraga, California
10	RHP	Scott Burke	R/R	6 ft 3 in (1.91 m)	197 lb (89 kg)	Sr	Glendora High School	Glendora, California
11	RHP	Jon Olsen	R/R	6 ft 3 in (1.91 m)	202 lb (92 kg)	So	Damien High School	Rancho Cucamonga, California
12	LHP	Justin Hooper	R/L	6 ft 7 in (2.01 m)	232 lb (105 kg)	So	De La Salle High School	San Ramon, California
14	RHP	Jake Bird	R/R	6 ft 3 in (1.91 m)	200 lb (91 kg)	Jr	West Ranch High School	Valencia, California
15	C	Will McInerny	R/R	6 ft 0 in (1.83 m)	177 lb (80 kg)	Fr	Laguna Beach High School	Laguna Beach, California
16	INF	Nick Kern (redshirt)	R/R	5 ft 11 in (1.8 m)	190 lb (86 kg)	RS Sr	Brea Olinda High School	Brea, California
18	OF	Jeremy Ydens	R/R	6 ft 2 in (1.88 m)	195 lb (88 kg)	Fr	Saint Francis High School	Campbell, California
19	RHP	Jack Ralston (redshirt)	R/R	6 ft 6 in (1.98 m)	217 lb (98 kg)	RS Fr	Hart High School	Santa Clarita, California
21	OF	Jordan Prendiz	L/L	5 ft 10 in (1.78 m)	175 lb (79 kg)	Fr	Mount Whitney High School	Visalia, California
24	INF	Zander Clarke (redshirt)	R/R	6 ft 5 in (1.96 m)	220 lb (100 kg)	RS So	Newbury Park High School	Newbury Park, California
25	OF	Daniel Amaral	R/R	5 ft 11 in (1.8 m)	178 lb (81 kg)	So	Huntington Beach High School	Huntington Beach, California
26	RHP	Brian Gadsby	R/R	6 ft 0 in (1.83 m)	170 lb (77 kg)	So	Crescenta Valley High School	Glendale, California
27	LHP	Garrett Barker (redshirt)	R/L	6 ft 3 in (1.91 m)	189 lb (86 kg)	RS So	Laguna Hills High School	Laguna Hills, California
28	INF	Jake Hirabayashi	R/R	5 ft 11 in (1.8 m)	185 lb (84 kg)	So	Notre Dame High School	Sherman Oaks, California
29	INF	Kyle Cuellar	L/R	6 ft 0 in (1.83 m)	182 lb (83 kg)	Fr	La Salle High School	Arcadia, California
30	RHP	Matt Walker (redshirt)	R/R	6 ft 4 in (1.93 m)	200 lb (91 kg)	RS So	Clovis North High School	Fresno, California
31	C	Gavin Johns	R/R	6 ft 2 in (1.88 m)	200 lb (91 kg)	So	Chaparral High School	Temecula, California
32	RHP	Ryan Garcia	R/R	6 ft 0 in (1.83 m)	180 lb (82 kg)	Fr	La Salle High School	Sierra Madre, California
33	INF	Chase Strumpf	R/R	6 ft 1 in (1.85 m)	197 lb (89 kg)	Fr	Junípero Serra High School	Dana Point, California
34	RHP	Kyle Molnar	R/R	6 ft 3 in (1.91 m)	195 lb (88 kg)	So	Aliso Niguel High School	Aliso Viejo, California
35	RHP	Kyle Mora	R/R	6 ft 1 in (1.85 m)	185 lb (84 kg)	Fr	Los Alamitos High School	Los Alamitos, California
36	OF	Jake Pries	R/R	6 ft 4 in (1.93 m)	215 lb (98 kg)	So	Junípero Serra High School	San Juan Capistrano, California
40	RHP	Moises Ceja	R/R	6 ft 0 in (1.83 m)	179 lb (81 kg)	Sr	Kennedy High School	Arleta, California
41	C	Ty Haselman	R/R	6 ft 1 in (1.85 m)	196 lb (89 kg)	Fr	Liberty High School	Newcastle, Washington
44	LHP	Nick Scheidler	L/L	6 ft 2 in (1.88 m)	184 lb (83 kg)	Fr	La Costa Canyon High School	Encinitas, California
45	RHP	Nathan Hadley (redshirt)	R/R	5 ft 11 in (1.8 m)	180 lb (82 kg)	RS So	Loyola High School	Los Angeles, California
47	C	Daniel Rosica (redshirt)	R/R	5 ft 11 in (1.8 m)	180 lb (82 kg)	RS So	Fountain Valley High School	Fountain Valley, California
48	OF	Curtis Godin	R/R	6 ft 0 in (1.83 m)	178 lb (81 kg)	Jr	Mater Dei High School	Seal Beach, California
55	RHP	Griffin Canning	R/R	6 ft 2 in (1.88 m)	180 lb (82 kg)	Jr	Santa Margarita High School	Coto de Caza, California

Head coach

John Savage (Nevada)

Assistant coach(es)

Niko Gallego (UCLA)

Hitting coach(es)

Bryant Ward (East Carolina)

Pitching coach(es)

Rex Peters (Cal State Fullerton)

Legend

- (C) Team captain
- (S) Suspended
- (I) Ineligible
- Injured
- Current redshirt

Roster
Last update: June 4, 2019

== Schedule ==
2017 UCLA Bruins baseball season game log
Regular season

February
Date	Time	Opponent	Rank	Site Stadium	Score	Win	Loss	Save	Attendance	Overall record (Pac-12 Record)
February 18	6:00 p.m.	San Jose State		Jackie Robinson Stadium; Los Angeles, California	3–2	**Gadsby** **(1–0)**	France (0–1)	—	867	1–0 (0–0)
February 19	1:00 p.m.	San Jose State		Jackie Robinson Stadium; Los Angeles, California	10–1	**Bird** **(1–0)**	Brown (0–1)	—	901	2–0 (0–0)
February 20	4:00 p.m.	San Jose State		Jackie Robinson Stadium; Los Angeles, California	**Cancelled**					
February 21	6:00 p.m.	UC Riverside		Jackie Robinson Stadium; Los Angeles, California	2–3	Toplikar (1–0)	**Gadsby** **(1–1)**	Lillie (1)	371	2–1 (0–0)
February 24	6:00 p.m.	Gonzaga		Jackie Robinson Stadium; Los Angeles, California	1–2^{10}	Hellinger (1–0)	**Gadsby** **(1–2)**	Mills (2)	733	2–2 (0–0)
February 25	2:00 p.m.	Gonzaga		Jackie Robinson Stadium; Los Angeles, California	6–1	**Bird** **(2–0)**	Vernia (1–1)	—	605	3–2 (0–0)
February 26	1:00 p.m.	Gonzaga		Jackie Robinson Stadium; Los Angeles, California	5–4	**Scheidler** **(1–0)**	Legumina (0–1)	**Gadsby (1)**	953	4–2 (0–0)
February 28	2:00 p.m.	CSUN		Matador Field; Northridge, California	5–6	Schriever (1–0)	**Ceja** **(0–1)**	O'Neil (1)	377	4–3 (0–0)

March
Date	Time	Opponent	Rank	Site Stadium	Score	Win	Loss	Save	Attendance	Overall record (Pac-12 Record)
March 3	6:00 p.m.	Michigan; Dodgertown Classic		Jackie Robinson Stadium; Los Angeles, California	1–0	**Gadsby** **(2–2)**	Henry (1–1)	—	833	5–3 (0–0)
March 4	2:00 p.m.	San Diego; Dodgertown Classic		Jackie Robinson Stadium; Los Angeles, California	1–3^{12}	Gadsby (2–3)	Barry (1–0)	Conyers (3)	890	5–4 (0–0)
March 5	3:00 p.m. P12N	USC; Dodgertown Classic/Rivalry		Dodger Stadium; Los Angeles, California	3–4^{10}	Clarke (1–0)	**Burke** **(0–1)**	Bates (1)	5,227	5–5 (0–0)
March 7	6:00 p.m.	CSUN		Jackie Robinson Stadium; Los Angeles, California	7–2	**Ceja** **(1–1)**	Diaz (0–1)	—	740	6–5 (0–0)
March 10	4:30 p.m.	Texas		UFCU Disch–Falk Field; Austin, Texas	4–5	Ridgeway (1–0)	**Gadsby** **(2–4)**	Johnston (1)	4,391	6–6 (0–0)
March 11	2:00 p.m.	Texas		UFCU DischFalk Field; Austin, Texas	2–5	Cooper (2–0)	**Scheidler** **(1–1)**	Johnston (2)	4,549	6–7 (0–0)
March 12	11:00 a.m.	Texas		UFCU DischFalk Field; Austin, Texas	5–10	Henley (2–1)	**Olsen** **(0–1)**	McKenzie (1)	4,869	6–8 (0–0)
March 14	6:00 p.m.	UC Irvine		Jackie Robinson Stadium; Los Angeles, California	3–5	Johnston (2–0)	**Scheidler** **(1–2)**	Faucher (7)	679	6–9 (0–0)
March 18	1:00 p.m.	Arizona; Doubleheader		Jackie Robinson Stadium; Los Angeles, California	4–19	Cloney (5–0)	**Canning** **(0–1)**	—	948	6–10 (0–1)
March 18	2:00 p.m.	Arizona; Doubleheader		Jackie Robinson Stadium; Los Angeles, California	3–4	Ming (4–0)	**Burke** **(0–2)**	—	1,109	6–11 (0–2)
March 19	2:00 p.m. P12N	Arizona		Jackie Robinson Stadium; Los Angeles, California	8–7^{10}	**Walker** **(1–0)**	Rivas (0–1)	—	1,077	7–11 (1–2)
March 24	6:00 p.m. P12N	California; Rivalry		Jackie Robinson Stadium; Los Angeles, California	9–5	**Canning** **(1–1)**	Patino (0–1)	—	763	8–11 (2–2)
March 25	4:00 p.m. P12N	California; Rivalry		Jackie Robinson Stadium; Los Angeles, California	9–4	**Garcia** **(1–0)**	Reyes (2–2)	—	857	9–11 (3–2)
March 36	2:00 p.m. P12N	California; Rivalry		Jackie Robinson Stadium; Los Angeles, California	20–0	**Olsen** **(1–1)**	Dodson (1–5)	—	1,053	10–11 (4–2)
March 28	6:00 p.m. P12N	Cal State Fullerton		Jackie Robinson Stadium; Los Angeles, California	9–7	**Garcia** **(2–0)**	Gibbs (1–3)	**Burke (1)**	555	11–11 (4–2)
March 31	6:30 p.m.	Arizona State		Phoenix Municipal Stadium; Phoenix, Arizona	9–3	**Canning** **(2–1)**	Lingos (3–2)	—	4,029	12–11 (5–2)

April
Date	Time	Opponent	Rank	Site Stadium	Score	Win	Loss	Save	Attendance	Overall record (Pac-12 Record)
April 1	6:30 p.m.	Arizona State		Phoenix Municipal Stadium; Phoenix, Arizona	4–5	Higgins (2–1)	**Scheidler** **(1–3)**	Erives (2)	2,613	12–12 (5–3)
April 2	12:30 p.m.	Arizona State		Phoenix Municipal Stadium; Phoenix, Arizona	17–4	**Olsen** **(2–1)**	Todd (1–3)	—	2,287	13–12 (6–3)
April 4	6:00 p.m.	San Diego State		Lake Elsinore Diamond; Lake Elsinore, California	4–5	Boyer (1–0)	**Scheidler** **(1–4)**	Saylor (8)	1,240	13–13 (6–3)
April 7	6:00 p.m.	Washington		Jackie Robinson Stadium; Los Angeles, California	3–7	Bremer (3–2)	**Canning** **(2–2)**	—	831	13–4 (6–4)
April 8	2:00 p.m.	Washington		Jackie Robinson Stadium; Los Angeles, California	3–6	Jones (4–4)	**Ceja** **(1–2)**	—	892	13–15 (6–5)
April 9	1:00 p.m.	Washington		Jackie Robinson Stadium; Los Angeles, California	6–5	**Bird** **(3–0)**	Minier (0–1)	—	1,124	14–15 (7–5)
April 13	6:00 p.m.	Stanford		Sunken Diamond; Stanford, California	2–0	**Canning** **(3–2)**	Bubic (2–6)	—	997	15–15 (8–5)
April 14	7:00 p.m.	Stanford		Sunken Diamond; Stanford, California	3–5	Hock (5–0)	**Ceja** **(1–3)**	—	1,268	15–16 (8–6)
April 15	4:00 p.m.	Stanford		Sunken Diamond; Stanford, California	7–6^{10}	**Gadsby** **(3–4)**	Hock (5–1)	—	2,400	16–16 (9–6)
April 18	7:00 p.m.	No. 12 Long Beach State		Jackie Robinson Stadium; Los Angeles, California	2–1^{11}	**Bird** **(4–0)**	Advocate (3–1)	—	410	17–16 (9–6)
April 21	4:00 p.m. P12N	No. 1 Oregon State		Jackie Robinson Stadium; Los Angeles, California	2–4^{10}	Mulholland (5–0)	**Bird** **(4–1)**	—	1,209	17–17 (9–7)
April 22	12:00 p.m. P12N	No. 1 Oregon State		Jackie Robinson Stadium; Los Angeles, California	7–1	**Ceja** **(2–3)**	Fehmel (4–2)	—	1,475	18–17 (10–7)
April 23	6:00 p.m.	No. 1 Oregon State		Jackie Robinson Stadium; Los Angeles, California	1–2	Verbung (1–0)	**Bird** **(4–2)**	Eisert (1)	1,377	18–18 (10–8)
April 25	6:00 p.m.	No. 9 Long Beach State		Blair Field; Long Beach, California	5–1	**Hooper** **(1–0)**	Jones (1–2)	—	1,809	19–18 (10–8)
April 28	6:00 p.m.	Cal Poly		Jackie Robinson Stadium; Los Angeles, California	2–1	**Canning** **(4–2)**	Uelmen (2–7)	**Burke (2)**	752	20–18 (10–8)
April 29	2:00 p.m.	Cal Poly		Jackie Robinson Stadium; Los Angeles, California	3–6	Howard (4–1)	**Ceja** **(2–4)**	Clark (7)	1,044	20–19 (10–8)
April 30	1:00 p.m.	Cal Poly		Jackie Robinson Stadium; Los Angeles, California	5–4	**Olsen** **(3–1)**	Ay (1–4)	**Burke (3)**	1,226	21–19 (10–8)

May
Date	Time	Opponent	Rank	Site Stadium	Score	Win	Loss	Save	Attendance	Overall record (Pac-12 Record)
May 2	6:00 p.m.	San Diego State		Jackie Robinson Stadium; Los Angeles, California	6–8	Fernandez (1–1)	**Burke** **(0–3)**	Saylor (12)	630	21–20 (10–8)
May 4	6:00 p.m. P12N	USC; Rivalry		Dedeaux Field; Los Angeles, California	2–0	**Canning** **(5–2)**	Stubbs (0–4)	—	706	22–20 (11–8)
May 5	7:00 p.m. P12N	USC; Rivalry		Dedeaux Field; Los Angeles, California	4–2	**Scheidler** **(2–4)**	Lunn (0–1)	**Burke(4)**	778	23–20 (12–8)
May 6	7:00 p.m. P12N	USC; Rivalry		Dedeaux Field; Los Angeles, California	13–0	**Olsen** **(4–1)**	Crouse (2–7)	—	1,050	24–20 (13–8)
May 9	6:00 p.m.	Cal State Fullerton		Goodwin Field; Fullerton, California	3–4	Velasquez (4–2)	**Hooper** **(1–1)**	Conine (11)	1,997	24–21 (13–8)
May 12	7:00 p.m.	Washington State		Bailey-Brayton Field; Pullman, Washington	1–7	Jones (3–3)	**Canning** **(5–3)**	—	751	24–22 (13–9)
May 13	4:00 p.m.	Washington State		Bailey-Brayton Field; Pullman, Washington	3–7	Anderson (5–2)	**Bird** **(4–3)**	—	823	24–23 (13–10)
May 14	12:00 p.m.	Washington State		Bailey-Brayton Field; Pullman, Washington	12–2	**Olsen** **(5–1)**	Mullins (2–3)	—	703	25–23 (14–10)
May 19	6:00 p.m.	Utah		Jackie Robinson Stadium; Los Angeles, California	7–3^{13}	**Canning** **(6–3)**	Rose (7–3)	—	721	26–23 (15–10)
May 20	6:00 p.m.	Utah		Jackie Robinson Stadium; Los Angeles, California	5–3	**Bird** **(5–3)**	Ottesen (4–4)	**Burke (5)**	1,199	27–23 (16–10)
May 21	1:00 p.m.	Utah		Jackie Robinson Stadium; Los Angeles, California	8–3	**Olsen** **(6–1)**	Lapiana (3–6)	—	826	28–23 (17–10)
May 23	6:30 p.m.	UC Irvine		Anteater Ballpark; Irvine, California	4–12	Faucher (2–5)	**Ceja** **(2–5)**	—	1,018	28–24 (17–10)
May 25	6:00 p.m. P12N	Oregon		PK Park; Eugene, Oregon	6–0	**Canning** **(7–3)**	Peterson (11–4)	—	1,643	29–24 (18–10)
May 26	6:00 p.m. P12N	Oregon		PK Park; Eugene, Oregon	1–2	Mercer (6–7)	**Bird** **(5–4)**	Yovan (15)	1,431	29–25 (18–11)
May 27	2:00 p.m. P12N	Oregon		PK Park; Eugene, Oregon	4–1	**Olsen** **(7–1)**	Stringer (1–1)	—	1,756	30–25 (19–11)

Postseason

NCAA tournament – Long Beach Regional
Date	Time	Opponent	Rank	Site Stadium	Score	Win	Loss	Save	Attendance	Overall record
June 2	4:00 p.m. ESPN2	(2) Texas; Quarterfinals	(3)	Blair Field; Long Beach, California	2–3	Nolan (10–4)	**Canning** **(7–4)**	Ridgeway (12)	2,283	30–26
June 3	1:00 p.m. ESPN3	(4) San Diego State; Elimination game	(3)	Blair Field; Long Beach, California	2–3^{13}	Saylor (3–0)	**Bird** **(5–5)**	—	1,773	30–27

- Bruins win
- Bruins loss
- Bold: Bruins team member
- Source: UCLA
- Rankings from Collegiate Baseball.
- (#) Tournament seedings in parentheses.
- All times are in Pacific Time.
