= Jared Oliva =

American baseball player (born 1995)

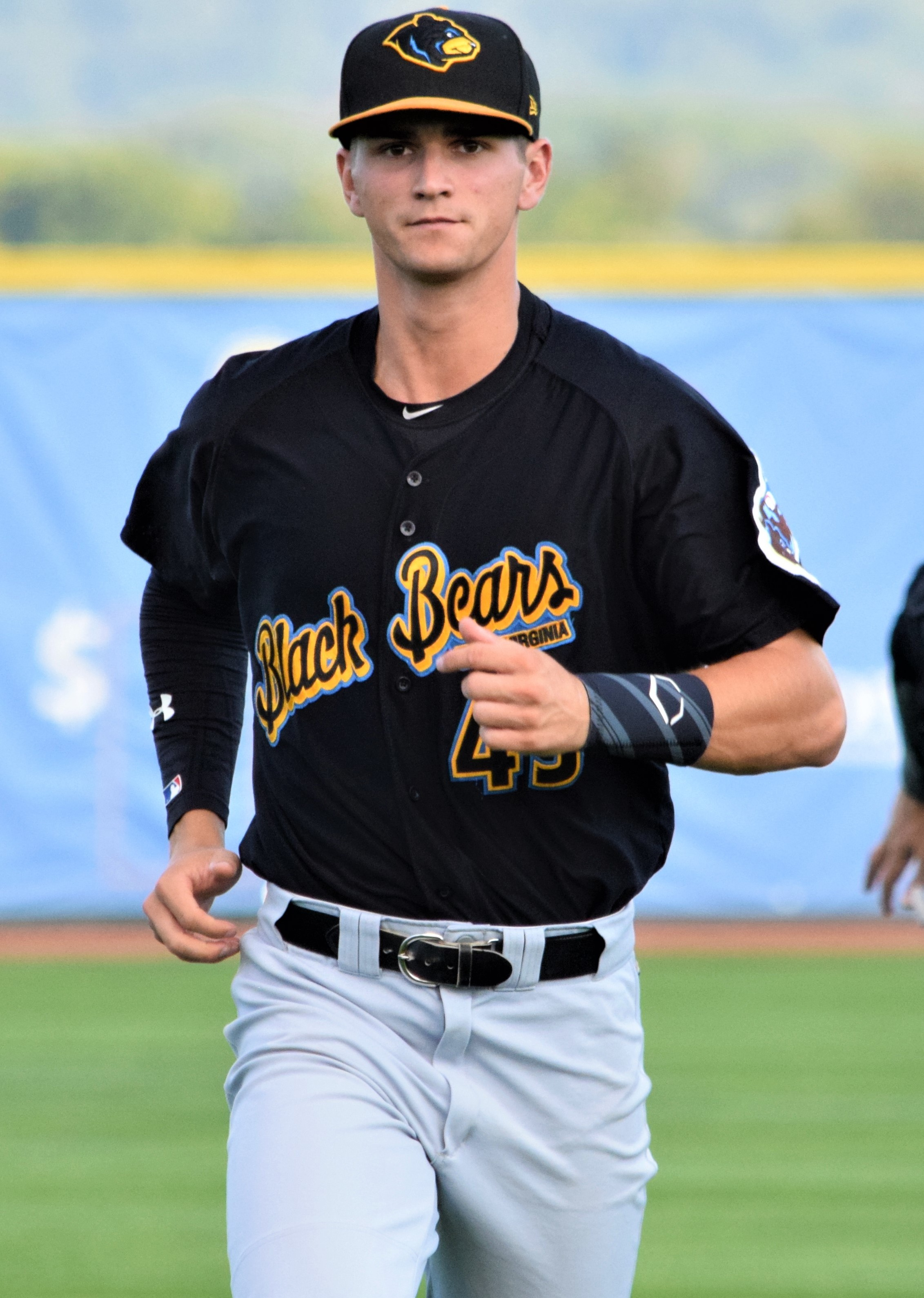
- Oliva with the West Virginia Black Bears in 2017

Free agent
- Outfielder
- Born: November 27, 1995 (age 30); Santa Clarita, California, U.S.
- Bats: Right Throws: Right

MLB debut
- September 21, 2020, for the Pittsburgh Pirates

MLB statistics (through 2026 season)
- Batting average: .175
- Home runs: 0
- Runs batted in: 2
- Stats at Baseball Reference

Teams
- Pittsburgh Pirates (2020–2021); San Francisco Giants (2026)

Jared Cole Oliva (born November 27, 1995) is an American professional baseball outfielder who is a free agent. He has previously played in Major League Baseball (MLB) for the Pittsburgh Pirates and San Francisco Giants.

== Amateur career ==
Oliva attended Valencia High School in Santa Clarita, California. As a senior, he hit .325 with 11 stolen bases. Undrafted in the 2013 MLB draft, he enrolled at the University of Arizona where he walked on to the Wildcats baseball team.

Oliva redshirted his freshman year at Arizona in 2014. In 2015, as a redshirt freshman, he appeared in 43 games in which he hit .272 with one home run and twenty RBIs. That summer, he played in the Northwoods League for the Wisconsin Woodchucks. As a redshirt sophomore in 2016, he batted .239 with four home runs, 34 RBIs, and 13 stolen bases over seventy games. That summer, he returned to play for the Woodchucks, batting .272 with two home runs in 30 games. In 2017, Oliva slashed .321/.385/.498 with four home runs and 54 RBIs in 59 games, earning All-Pac-12 First Team honors and a spot on the All-Pac-12 All-Defensive Team after posting a .985 fielding percentage.

== Professional career ==
=== Pittsburgh Pirates ===
The Pittsburgh Pirates selected Oliva in the seventh round of the 2017 Major League Baseball draft. He signed for $200,000 and made his professional debut with the West Virginia Black Bears. Over 56 games, he hit .266 with 17 RBI and 15 stolen bases. Oliva spent the 2018 season with the Bradenton Marauders, slashing .275/.354/.424 with nine home runs, 47 RBI, and 33 stolen bases in 108 games. In 2019, he played with the Altoona Curve, batting .277/.352/.398 with six home runs, 42 RBI, and 36 stolen bases over 123 games. After the season, he was assigned to the Peoria Javelinas of the Arizona Fall League, earning Fall All-Star honors.

On September 21, 2020, Oliva was selected to the 40-man and active rosters. He made his major league debut that day against the Chicago Cubs. He recorded his first hit, a single, on September 24 versus Alec Mills of the Cubs.

Oliva spent a majority of the 2021 season in the minor leagues with the Triple-A Indianapolis Indians, batting .249 with two home runs and 23 RBI over 64 games. He received 40 at bats with the Pirates with whom he hit .175 with two RBI and two doubles.

On March 31, 2022, Oliva was designated for assignment to clear a roster spot for Josh VanMeter. Oliva spent the entirety of the 2022 campaign with Indianapolis, playing in 99 games and hitting .267/.324/.430 with eight home runs, 37 RBI, and 21 stolen bases.

=== Los Angeles Angels ===
On December 7, 2022, Oliva was claimed by the Los Angeles Angels in the minor league phase of the Rule 5 draft. He spent the 2023 season with the Triple-A Salt Lake Bees, playing in 92 games and hitting .261/.348/.423 with 8 home runs, 37 RBI, and 16 stolen bases. Oliva elected free agency following the season on November 6.

=== Seattle Mariners ===
On February 22, 2024, Oliva signed with the Charros de Jalisco of the Mexican League.

On March 22, 2024, Oliva signed a minor league contract with the Seattle Mariners. In 69 games for the Double-A Arkansas Travelers, he slashed .294/.378/.463 with seven home runs, 40 RBI, and 37 stolen bases. Oliva elected free agency following the season on November 4.

=== Milwaukee Brewers ===
On November 25, 2024, Oliva signed a minor league contract with the Milwaukee Brewers. He started the 2025 season with the Triple-A Nashville Sounds, ultimately playing in 95 games for the team, in which he batted .252/.335/.413 with 11 home runs, 44 RBI, and 57 stolen bases. Oliva elected free agency following the season on November 6, 2025.

=== San Francisco Giants ===
On January 12, 2026, Oliva signed a minor league contract with the San Francisco Giants. On March 25, the Giants selected Oliva's contract after he made the team's Opening Day roster. On April 15, Oliva was placed on the injured list due to a hamate fracture. He was transferred to the 60-day injured list on April 29. On June 20, Oliva was activated by San Francisco and was subsequently designated for assignment.

=== New York Mets ===
On June 23, 2026, the New York Mets claimed Oliva off of waivers. He made four appearances for the Triple-A Syracuse Mets, where he went 3-for-15 (.200) with four stolen bases and two walks. Oliva was designated for assignment by the Mets on July 9. He was released by the Mets on July 11.

=== Tampa Bay Rays ===
On August 28, 2026, Oliva signed a minor league contract with the Tampa Bay Rays. He played in eight games for the Triple-A Durham Bulls and went 5-for-9 (.556) with four stolen bases. He elected free agency on November 2.
