= J. J. Matijevic =

American baseball player (born 1995)

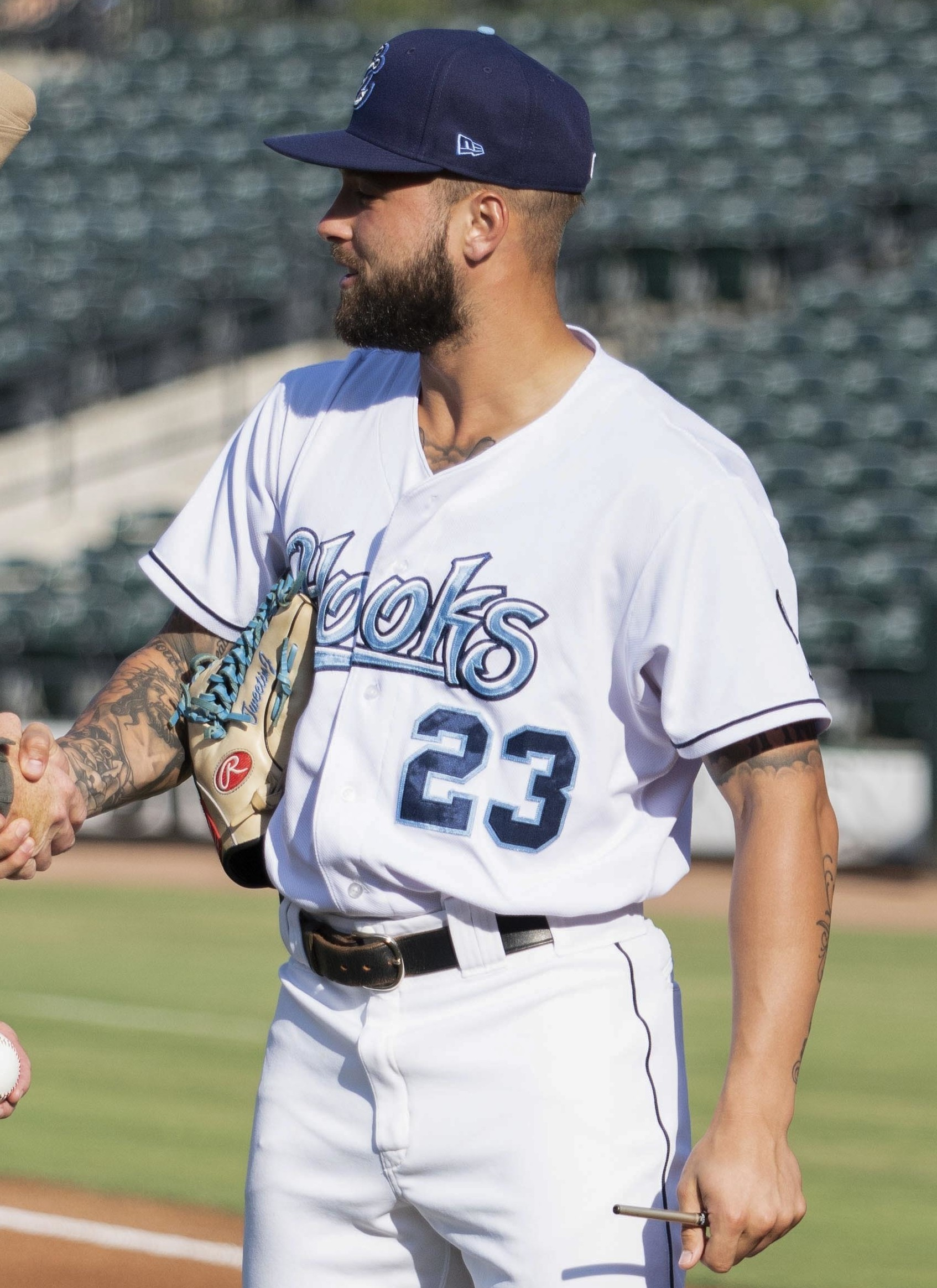
- Matijevic with the Corpus Christi Hooks in 2019

Tigres de Quintana Roo – No. 17
- Second baseman
- Born: November 14, 1995 (age 30); Latrobe, Pennsylvania, U.S.
- Bats: Left Throws: Right

MLB debut
- April 22, 2022, for the Houston Astros

MLB statistics (through 2022 season)
- Batting average: .209
- Home runs: 2
- Runs batted in: 5
- Stats at Baseball Reference

Teams
- Houston Astros (2022)

Joseph John Matijevic (born November 14, 1995) is an American professional baseball first baseman for the Tigres de Quintana Roo of the Mexican League. He has previously played in Major League Baseball (MLB) for the Houston Astros.

== Amateur career ==
Matijevic attended Norwin High School in North Huntingdon, Pennsylvania, where he played baseball and basketball. The Boston Red Sox selected him as a shortstop in the 22nd round of the 2014 MLB draft. He did not sign and enrolled at the University of Arizona, where he played college baseball for the Arizona Wildcats. In 2015 and 2016, Matijevic played collegiate summer baseball with the Falmouth Commodores of the Cape Cod Baseball League, where he was named a league all-star in 2015.

== Professional career ==
=== Houston Astros ===
==== Minor Leagues ====
The Houston Astros selected Matijevic with the 75th overall selection of the 2017 Major League Baseball draft. He signed with the Astros, receiving a $700,000 signing bonus, and was assigned to the Tri-City ValleyCats of the Low–A New York-Penn League, where he began his professional career. Matijevic was promoted to the Quad Cities River Bandits of the Single–A Midwest League in August. In 59 games between the two teams, he hit .228 with seven home runs, 31 RBI, and 11 stolen bases.

Matijevic began 2018 with Quad Cities. In May, the Astros promoted him to the Buies Creek Astros of the High–A Carolina League. In 101 games between both teams, he hit .277/.350/.538 with 22 home runs and 62 RBI. He began 2019 with the Corpus Christi Hooks of the Double–A Texas League. On April 30, Matijevic received a 50-game suspension after failing a second positive test for a drug of abuse. He was selected to play in the Arizona Fall League for the Peoria Javelinas following the season.

Matijevic did not play in a game in 2020 due to the cancellation of the minor league season because of the COVID-19 pandemic. He split the 2021 season between Corpus Christi and the Triple-A Sugar Land Skeeters, slashing .254/.341/.512 with 25 home runs and 75 RBI in 109 total games.

The Astros invited Matijevic to Spring Training in 2022. He did not make the team at the outset of the season and was assigned to Triple-A Sugar Land, who had rebranded as the Sugar Land Space Cowboys. He began the season batting .310 (13-for-42), .420 OBP, .714 SLG, 1.134 OPS, with four home runs, and 10 RBI over 11 games.

==== Major Leagues ====
After a hamstring injury to Jose Altuve, the Astros called up Matijevic from Sugar Land on April 20, 2022. He made his major league debut on April 22 versus the Toronto Blue Jays, as a pinch hitter in the ninth inning of a 4–3 loss. Matijevic struck out in his lone at bat. He received his first career start in the major leagues on April 27, manning first base versus the Texas Rangers. On June 19, Matijevic recorded his first major league hit, a home run, against Chicago White Sox starter Michael Kopech, which landed in the Crawford Box seats at Minute Maid Park in a 4–3 Astros' win. In the bottom of the ninth inning versus the New York Yankees on July 21, Matijevic hit a walk-off infield single with the bases loaded to score Alex Bregman for a 3–2 win .

Matijevic was optioned to the Triple-A Sugar Land Space Cowboys to begin the 2023 season. He was designated for assignment on March 30, after Corey Julks and César Salazar were added to the roster. On April 3, he cleared waivers and was sent outright to Triple-A Sugar Land. In 118 games for Sugar Land, Matijevic batted .244/.329/.441 with 16 home runs, 76 RBI, and 8 stolen bases. He became a free agent following the season on November 6.

=== Dorados de Chihuahua ===
On April 10, 2024, Matijevic signed with the Dorados de Chihuahua of the Mexican League. In 31 games for Chihuahua, he batted .273/.347/.400 with two home runs and 15 RBI. On June 11, Matijevic was released by the Dorados.

=== Caliente de Durango ===
On June 12, 2024, Matijevic was claimed off release waivers by the Caliente de Durango of the Mexican League. In 38 games for Durango, Matijevic batted .361/.427/.489 with one home run, 18 RBI, and one stolen base.

=== Charleston Dirty Birds ===
On April 24, 2025, Matijevic signed with the Charleston Dirty Birds of the Atlantic League of Professional Baseball. In 26 appearances for Charleston, Matijevic batted .273/.374/.566 with eight home runs, 20 RBI, and four stolen bases.

=== Tigres de Quintana Roo ===
On May 31, 2025, Matijevic's contractual rights were traded to the Tigres de Quintana Roo of the Mexican League. In 45 games he hit .293/.344/.533 with 8 home runs, 40 RBIs and 3 stolen bases.

== See also ==
- List of University of Arizona people
