= 2017 NCAA Division I baseball season =

Baseball season

- Duration: February 13, 2017 – June 27, 2017
- Number of teams: 301
- Preseason No. 1: TCU (Unanimous)
- Defending champions: Coastal Carolina

Tournament
- Duration: June 2–27, 2017
- Most conference bids: SEC (8)

College World Series
- Champions: Florida (1st title)
- Runners-up: LSU (18th CWS Appearance)
- Winning coach: Kevin O'Sullivan (1st title)
- MOP: Alex Faedo (Florida)

Seasons
- ← 2016 2018 →

The 2017 NCAA Division I baseball season, play of college baseball in the United States organized by the National Collegiate Athletic Association (NCAA) at the Division I level, began in February 2017. The season progressed through the regular season, many conference tournaments and championship series, and concluded with the 2017 NCAA Division I baseball tournament and 2017 College World Series. The College World Series, consisted of the eight remaining teams in the NCAA tournament and held annually in Omaha, Nebraska, at TD Ameritrade Park Omaha, ended June 27, 2017.

== Realignment ==
- Coastal Carolina left the Big South Conference for the Sun Belt Conference. The move officially took effect hours after Coastal won the College World Series. In doing so, the Sun Belt Conference split into East and West divisions for this season.
- North Dakota, a member of the Western Athletic Conference in baseball (as well as swimming and diving for both sexes), dropped baseball.

The 2017 season was also the last for one school's baseball program, and the last for two other programs in their then-current conferences. In addition, the last remaining Division I independent left for its full-time home of Division II.

- Buffalo dropped baseball at the end of the season.
- NYIT, which had been left independent after the 2013 collapse of the Great West Conference, dropped its baseball program to Division II, joining the school's full-time home of the East Coast Conference.
- Valparaiso left its home of the previous 10 seasons, the Horizon League, for the Missouri Valley Conference (MVC).
- Wichita State left the MVC, its conference home since 1945, to become a full but non-football member of the American Athletic Conference.

== Season outlook ==
Collegiate Baseball News
Ranking	Team
1	TCU
2	LSU
3	Florida
4	South Carolina
5	Oregon State
6	Vanderbilt
7	Arizona
8	Miami (FL)
9	Florida State
10	Cal State Fullerton
11	Louisville
12	Clemson
13	East Carolina
14	Louisiana–Lafayette
15	North Carolina
16	Virginia
17	Long Beach State
18	UC Santa Barbara
19	Coastal Carolina
20	Texas A&M
21	Washington
22	Ole Miss
23	Sam Houston State
24	Stanford
25	Arizona State

Baseball America
Ranking	Team
1	TCU
2	Florida State
3	Florida
4	LSU
5	South Carolina
6	East Carolina
7	Louisville
8	Cal State Fullerton
9	Oregon State
10	Clemson
11	Vanderbilt
12	Washington
13	Louisiana–Lafayette
14	NC State
15	Coastal Carolina
16	Virginia
17	North Carolina
18	Oklahoma State
19	UC Santa Barbara
20	Long Beach State
21	Georgia Tech
22	Arizona
23	Stanford
24	Maryland
25	Texas Tech

Coaches
Ranking	Team
1	TCU 24
2	Florida 4
3	LSU 2
4	South Carolina
5	Florida State
6	Vanderbilt
7	Oregon State
8	Louisville
9	Coastal Carolina 1
10	East Carolina
11	Cal State Fullerton
12	Clemson
13	North Carolina
14	NC State
15	Arizona
16	Louisiana–Lafayette
17	Miami (FL)
18	Virginia
19	Texas Tech
20	Texas A&M
21	Stanford
22	Oklahoma State
23	UC Santa Barbara
24	Ole Miss
25	Rice

NCBWA
Ranking	Team
1	TCU
2	Florida
3	LSU
4	Florida State
5	South Carolina
6	Vanderbilt
7	Oregon State
8	Louisville
9	East Carolina
10	NC State
11	Coastal Carolina
12	North Carolina
13	Clemson
14	Cal State Fullerton
15	Louisiana–Lafayette
16	Arizona
17	Texas Tech
18	Miami (FL)
19	Virginia
20	Texas A&M
21	UC Santa Barbara
22	Oklahoma State
23	Stanford
24	Rice
25	Maryland

== Conference standings ==
2017 America East Conference baseball standings
	Conf.				Overall
Team	W		L	PCT	W		L	PCT
Binghamton ‍†‍‍	15	–	4	.789	30	–	13	.698
UMBC ‍‍‡‍^{y}	11	–	9	.550	23	–	25	.479
Stony Brook ‍‍‍	12	–	10	.545	26	–	26	.500
Albany ‍‍‍	10	–	13	.435	26	–	26	.500
UMass Lowell * ‍‍‍	10	–	13	.435	22	–	26	.458
Maine ‍‍‍	8	–	12	.400	25	–	29	.463
Hartford ‍‍‍	8	–	13	.381	20	–	30	.400
† – Conference champion ‡ – Tournament champion y – Invited to the NCAA tournament Ineligible for league and NCAA tournaments due to transition from Division II; As of June 30, 2017; Rankings from Collegiate Baseball

2017 American Athletic Conference baseball standings
	Conf.				Overall
Team	W		L	PCT	W		L	PCT
UCF ‍†‍‍^{y}	15	–	9	.625	40	–	22	.645
No. 27 Houston ‍†‍‡‍^{y}	15	–	9	.625	42	–	21	.667
South Florida ‍‍‍^{y}	14	–	10	.583	42	–	19	.689
Connecticut ‍‍‍	14	–	10	.583	33	–	25	.569
Tulane ‍‍‍	13	–	11	.542	27	–	31	.466
Cincinnati ‍‍‍	10	–	14	.417	28	–	30	.483
Memphis ‍‍‍	8	–	16	.333	30	–	29	.508
East Carolina ‍‍‍	7	–	17	.292	32	–	28	.533
† – Conference champion ‡ – Tournament champion y – Invited to the NCAA tournament Rankings from Collegiate Baseball

2017 Atlantic 10 Conference baseball standings
	Conf.				Overall
Team	W		L	PCT	W		L	PCT
VCU ‍†‍‍	19	–	5	.792	35	–	22	.614
Rhode Island ‍‍‍	17	–	6	.739	31	–	22	.585
St. Bonaventure ‍‍‍	15	–	8	.652	26	–	22	.542
George Washington ‍‍‍	14	–	10	.583	31	–	27	.534
Saint Louis ‍‍‍	12	–	10	.545	35	–	22	.614
No. 16 Davidson ‍‍‡‍^{y}	13	–	11	.542	35	–	26	.574
George Mason ‍‍‍	13	–	11	.542	26	–	33	.441
Saint Joseph's ‍‍‍	12	–	12	.500	21	–	25	.457
Fordham ‍‍‍	11	–	12	.478	27	–	24	.529
Dayton ‍‍‍	9	–	15	.375	20	–	35	.364
UMass ‍‍‍	8	–	16	.333	15	–	32	.319
Richmond ‍‍‍	6	–	17	.261	17	–	36	.321
La Salle ‍‍‍	4	–	20	.167	10	–	41	.196
† – Conference champion ‡ – Tournament champion y – Invited to the NCAA tournament Rankings from Collegiate Baseball

2017 Atlantic Coast Conference baseball standings
	Conf.				Overall
Team	W		L	PCT	W		L	PCT
Atlantic
No. 5 Louisville ^{x}‍‍‍^{y}	23	–	6	.793	53	–	12	.815
No. 12 Wake Forest ‍‍‍^{y}	19	–	11	.633	43	–	20	.683
No. 25 Clemson ‍‍‍^{y}	17	–	13	.567	42	–	21	.667
No. 30 NC State ‍‍‍^{y}	16	–	14	.533	36	–	25	.590
No. 6 Florida State ‍‍‡‍^{y}	14	–	14	.500	46	–	23	.667
Boston College ‍‍‍	11	–	19	.367	25	–	28	.472
Notre Dame ‍‍‍	10	–	20	.333	26	–	32	.448
Coastal
No. 17 North Carolina ^{x}‍‍‍^{y}	23	–	7	.767	49	–	14	.778
No. 21 Virginia ‍‍‍^{y}	18	–	12	.600	43	–	16	.729
Miami (FL) ‍‍‍	16	–	13	.552	31	–	27	.534
Duke ‍‍‍	12	–	18	.400	30	–	28	.517
Georgia Tech ‍‍‍	11	–	19	.367	27	–	28	.491
Pittsburgh ‍‍‍	9	–	21	.300	23	–	30	.434
Virginia Tech ‍‍‍	9	–	21	.300	23	–	32	.418
x – Division champion ‡ – Tournament champion y – Invited to the NCAA tournament Rankings from Collegiate Baseball

2017 ASUN Conference baseball standings
	Conf.				Overall
Team	W		L	PCT	W		L	PCT
Jacksonville ‍†‍‍	16	–	5	.762	36	–	24	.600
Stetson ‍‍‍	15	–	6	.714	27	–	29	.482
Florida Gulf Coast ‍‍‡‍^{y}	13	–	8	.619	43	–	20	.683
North Florida ‍‍‍	12	–	9	.571	33	–	24	.579
Kennesaw State ‍‍‍	10	–	11	.476	25	–	32	.439
Lipscomb ‍‍‍	9	–	12	.429	28	–	28	.500
USC Upstate ‍‍‍	7	–	14	.333	24	–	31	.436
NJIT ‍‍‍	2	–	19	.095	9	–	40	.184
† – Conference champion ‡ – Tournament champion y – Invited to the NCAA tournament As of June 30, 2017; Rankings from Collegiate Baseball

2017 Big 12 Conference baseball standings
	Conf.				Overall
Team	W		L	PCT	W		L	PCT
No. 19 Texas Tech ‍†‍‍^{y}	16	–	8	.667	45	–	17	.726
No. 4 TCU ‍‍‍^{y}	16	–	8	.667	50	–	18	.735
Oklahoma ‍‍‍^{y}	12	–	11	.522	35	–	24	.593
Baylor ‍‍‍^{y}	12	–	12	.500	34	–	23	.596
West Virginia ‍‍‍^{y}	12	–	12	.500	36	–	26	.581
No. 28 Texas ‍‍‍^{y}	11	–	12	.478	39	–	24	.619
Kansas ‍‍‍	11	–	13	.458	30	–	28	.517
Oklahoma State ‍‍‡‍^{y}	8	–	14	.364	30	–	27	.526
Kansas State ‍‍‍	8	–	16	.333	29	–	26	.527
† – Conference champion ‡ – Conference Tournament champion y – Invited to the NCAA tournament Rankings from Collegiate Baseball

2017 Big East Conference baseball standings
	Conf.				Overall
Team	W		L	PCT	W		L	PCT
Creighton ‍†‍‍	11	–	4	.733	24	–	25	.490
St. John's ‍‍‍^{y}	13	–	5	.722	42	–	13	.764
Xavier ‍‍‡‍^{y}	10	–	6	.625	34	–	27	.557
Seton Hall ‍‍‍	10	–	8	.556	29	–	24	.547
Butler ‍‍‍	7	–	10	.412	31	–	20	.608
Villanova ‍‍‍	5	–	13	.278	14	–	33	.298
Georgetown ‍‍‍	4	–	14	.222	27	–	28	.491
† – Conference champion ‡ – Tournament champion y – Invited to the NCAA tournament Rankings from Collegiate Baseball

2017 Big South Conference baseball standings
	Conf.				Overall
Team	W		L	PCT	W		L	PCT
Winthrop ‍†‍‍	17	–	7	.708	34	–	24	.586
Liberty ‍‍‍	16	–	8	.667	32	–	23	.582
Presbyterian ‍‍‍	15	–	9	.625	32	–	29	.525
High Point ‍‍‍	13	–	11	.542	30	–	23	.566
Radford ‍‍‡‍^{y}	11	–	13	.458	27	–	32	.458
Gardner–Webb ‍‍‍	11	–	13	.458	25	–	30	.455
UNC Asheville ‍‍‍	11	–	13	.458	25	–	32	.439
Campbell ‍‍‍	10	–	14	.417	25	–	32	.439
Charleston Southern ‍‍‍	9	–	15	.375	22	–	29	.431
Longwood ‍‍‍	7	–	17	.292	19	–	34	.358
† – Conference champion ‡ – Tournament champion y – Invited to the NCAA tournament Rankings from Collegiate Baseball

2017 Big Ten Conference baseball standings
	Conf.						Overall
Team	W		L		T	PCT	W		L		T	PCT
Nebraska ‍†‍‍^{y}	16	–	7	–	1	.688	35	–	22	–	1	.612
Michigan ‍‍‍^{y}	16	–	8	–	0	.667	42	–	17	–	0	.712
Minnesota ‍‍‍	15	–	8	–	0	.652	36	–	21	–	0	.632
Iowa ‍‍‡‍^{y}	15	–	9	–	0	.625	39	–	22	–	0	.639
Maryland ‍‍‍^{y}	15	–	9	–	0	.625	38	–	23	–	0	.623
Indiana ‍‍‍^{y}	14	–	9	–	1	.604	34	–	24	–	2	.583
Northwestern ‍‍‍	13	–	11	–	0	.542	27	–	30	–	0	.474
Purdue ‍‍‍	12	–	12	–	0	.500	29	–	27	–	0	.518
Michigan State ‍‍‍	10	–	14	–	0	.417	29	–	23	–	0	.558
Illinois ‍‍‍	9	–	15	–	0	.375	23	–	28	–	0	.451
Ohio State ‍‍‍	8	–	16	–	0	.333	22	–	34	–	0	.393
Rutgers ‍‍‍	7	–	16	–	0	.304	19	–	34	–	0	.358
Penn State ‍‍‍	4	–	20	–	0	.167	18	–	37	–	0	.327
† – Conference champion ‡ – Tournament champion y – Invited to the NCAA tournament Rankings from Collegiate Baseball

2017 Big West Conference baseball standings
	Conf.						Overall
Team	W		L		T	PCT	W		L		T	PCT
No. 9 Long Beach State^{†}^{y} ‍‍‍	20	–	4	–	0	.833	42	–	20	–	1	.675
Cal Poly ‍‍‍	16	–	8	–	0	.667	28	–	28	–	0	.500
No. 7 Cal State Fullerton^{y} ‍‍‍	15	–	9	–	0	.625	39	–	24	–	0	.619
Cal State Northridge ‍‍‍	12	–	12	–	0	.500	26	–	29	–	0	.473
Hawaii ‍‍‍	10	–	14	–	0	.417	28	–	23	–	0	.549
UC Davis ‍‍‍	10	–	14	–	0	.417	21	–	30	–	0	.412
UC Irvine ‍‍‍	9	–	15	–	0	.375	23	–	33	–	0	.411
UC Santa Barbara ‍‍‍	8	–	16	–	0	.333	24	–	32	–	0	.429
UC Riverside ‍‍‍	8	–	16	–	0	.333	22	–	32	–	0	.407
† – Conference champion y – Invited to the NCAA tournament Rankings from Collegiate Baseball

2017 Colonial Athletic Association baseball standings
	Conf.				Overall
Team	W		L	PCT	W		L	PCT
Northeastern ‍†‍‍	16	–	7	.696	29	–	25	.537
UNC Wilmington ‍‍‍	16	–	8	.667	30	–	29	.508
William & Mary ‍‍‍	15	–	8	.652	32	–	25	.561
Delaware ‍‍‡‍^{y}	15	–	9	.625	34	–	23	.596
College of Charleston ‍‍‍	13	–	11	.542	28	–	31	.475
Elon ‍‍‍	12	–	12	.500	24	–	32	.429
James Madison ‍‍‍	7	–	17	.292	24	–	27	.471
Hofstra ‍‍‍	7	–	17	.292	14	–	37	.275
Towson ‍‍‍	6	–	18	.250	20	–	34	.370
† – Conference champion ‡ – Tournament champion y – Invited to the NCAA tournament As of June 30, 2017; Rankings from Collegiate Baseball

2017 Conference USA baseball standings
	Conf.						Overall
Team	W		L		T	PCT	W		L		T	PCT
No. 23 Southern Miss^{y}^{†} ‍‍‍	25	–	5	–	0	.833	50	–	16	–	0	.758
Old Dominion ‍‍‍	19	–	11	–	0	.633	37	–	21	–	0	.638
Florida Atlantic ‍‍‍	18	–	12	–	0	.600	35	–	21	–	1	.623
Charlotte ‍‍‍	18	–	12	–	0	.600	34	–	24	–	0	.586
Louisiana Tech ‍‍‍	17	–	13	–	0	.567	36	–	20	–	0	.643
Rice^{y} ‍‍‡‍	16	–	14	–	0	.533	33	–	31	–	0	.516
FIU ‍‍‍	15	–	15	–	0	.500	31	–	27	–	0	.534
UTSA ‍‍‍	15	–	15	–	0	.500	29	–	28	–	0	.509
Marshall ‍‍‍	12	–	18	–	0	.400	25	–	29	–	0	.463
Middle Tennessee ‍‍‍	10	–	20	–	0	.333	24	–	31	–	0	.436
UAB ‍‍‍	9	–	21	–	0	.300	24	–	31	–	0	.436
Western Kentucky ‍‍‍	6	–	24	–	0	.200	16	–	39	–	0	.291
† – Conference champion ‡ – Tournament champion y – Invited to the NCAA tournament Rankings from Collegiate Baseball

2017 Horizon League baseball standings
	Conf.				Overall
Team	W		L	PCT	W		L	PCT
UIC ‍†‍‡‍^{y}	22	–	8	.733	39	–	17	.696
Wright State ‍‍‍	21	–	9	.700	38	–	21	.644
Northern Kentucky ‍‍‍	17	–	13	.567	25	–	33	.431
Valparaiso ‍‍‍	13	–	15	.464	24	–	29	.453
Oakland ‍‍‍	11	–	19	.367	17	–	40	.298
Milwaukee ‍‍‍	10	–	18	.357	22	–	32	.407
Youngstown State ‍‍‍	9	–	21	.300	15	–	40	.273
† – Conference champion ‡ – Tournament champion y – Invited to the NCAA tournament Rankings from Collegiate Baseball

2017 NCAA Division I baseball independents standings
	Conf.						Overall
Team	W		L		T	PCT	W		L		T	PCT
NYIT ‍‍‍	0	–	0	–	0	–	5	–	36	–	1	.131
Rankings from Collegiate Baseball

2017 Ivy League baseball standings
	Conf.				Overall
Team	W		L	PCT	W		L	PCT
Lou Gehrig
Penn ^{x}‍‍‍	12	–	8	.600	23	–	22	.511
Columbia ^{x}‍‍‍	12	–	8	.600	18	–	23	.439
Cornell ‍‍‍	9	–	11	.450	21	–	17	.553
Princeton ‍‍‍	7	–	13	.350	12	–	28	.300
Red Rolfe
Yale ^{x}‍‍‡‍^{y}	16	–	4	.800	34	–	18	.654
Dartmouth ‍‍‍	11	–	9	.550	22	–	17	.564
Harvard ‍‍‍	7	–	13	.350	19	–	23	.452
Brown ‍‍‍	6	–	14	.300	13	–	24	.351
x – Division champion ‡ – Championship Series champion y – Invited to the NCAA tournament Rankings from Collegiate Baseball

2017 Metro Atlantic Athletic Conference baseball standings
	Conf.				Overall
Team	W		L	PCT	W		L	PCT
Fairfield ‍†‍‍	17	–	7	.708	31	–	24	.564
Marist ‍‍‡‍^{y}	16	–	8	.667	32	–	23	.582
Canisius ‍‍‍	16	–	8	.667	35	–	22	.614
Iona ‍‍‍	14	–	10	.583	25	–	26	.490
Rider ‍‍‍	12	–	12	.500	24	–	28	.462
Manhattan ‍‍‍	12	–	12	.500	18	–	35	.340
Niagara ‍‍‍	12	–	12	.500	24	–	24	.500
Monmouth ‍‍‍	11	–	13	.458	20	–	28	.417
Quinnipiac ‍‍‍	11	–	13	.458	18	–	32	.360
Siena ‍‍‍	11	–	13	.458	20	–	28	.417
Saint Peter's ‍‍‍	0	–	24	.000	0	–	38	.000
† – Conference champion ‡ – Tournament champion y – Invited to the NCAA tournament Rankings from Collegiate Baseball

2017 Mid-American Conference baseball standings
	Conf.				Overall
Team	W		L	PCT	W		L	PCT
East Division
Kent State ^{x}‍†‍‍	18	–	6	.750	37	–	18	.673
Ohio ‍‍‡‍^{y}	13	–	11	.542	31	–	28	.525
Bowling Green ‍‍‍	9	–	15	.375	15	–	34	.306
Miami (OH) ‍‍‍	8	–	16	.333	22	–	34	.393
Buffalo ‍‍‍	8	–	16	.333	17	–	34	.333
West Division
Central Michigan ^{x}‍‍‍	16	–	8	.667	31	–	28	.525
Ball State ‍‍‍	14	–	10	.583	30	–	28	.517
Eastern Michigan ‍‍‍	14	–	10	.583	27	–	35	.435
Western Michigan ‍‍‍	12	–	12	.500	24	–	29	.453
Northern Illinois ‍‍‍	11	–	13	.458	17	–	38	.309
Toledo ‍‍‍	9	–	15	.375	17	–	41	.293
x – Division champion † – Conference champion ‡ – Tournament champion y – Invited to the NCAA tournament Rankings from Collegiate Baseball

2017 Mid-Eastern Athletic Conference baseball standings
	Conf.				Overall
Team	W		L	PCT	W		L	PCT
Northern
Norfolk State ^{x}‍†‍‍	16	–	7	.696	26	–	22	.542
Delaware State ‍‍‍	14	–	10	.583	22	–	25	.468
Maryland Eastern Shore ‍‍‍	9	–	15	.375	12	–	40	.231
Coppin State ‍‍‍	8	–	15	.348	11	–	31	.262
Southern
Bethune–Cookman ^{x}‍‍‡‍^{y}	15	–	8	.652	36	–	25	.590
North Carolina A&T ‍‍‍	15	–	9	.625	28	–	25	.528
Florida A&M ‍‍‍	14	–	10	.583	27	–	26	.509
North Carolina Central ‍‍‍	12	–	11	.522	22	–	28	.440
Savannah State ‍‍‍	3	–	21	.125	12	–	39	.235
x – Division champion † – Conference champion ‡ – Tournament champion y – Invited to the NCAA tournament Rankings from Collegiate Baseball

2017 Missouri Valley Conference baseball standings
	Conf.				Overall
Team	W		L	PCT	W		L	PCT
No. 11 Missouri St^{y} ‍‍‍	18	–	1	.947	43	–	20	.683
No. 20 DBU^{y} ‍‍‡‍	15	–	6	.714	42	–	21	.667
Indiana State ‍‍‍	12	–	9	.571	29	–	26	.527
Southern Illinois ‍‍‍	10	–	10	.500	27	–	30	.474
Wichita State ‍‍‍	10	–	11	.476	28	–	30	.483
Evansville ‍‍‍	8	–	12	.400	18	–	39	.316
Bradley ‍‍‍	6	–	14	.300	20	–	31	.392
Illinois State ‍‍‍	2	–	18	.100	16	–	40	.286
‡ – Tournament champion y – Invited to the NCAA tournament Rankings from Collegiate Baseball

2017 Mountain West Conference baseball standings
	Conf.						Overall
Team	W		L		T	PCT	W		L		T	PCT
New Mexico ‍†‍‍	19	–	9	–	1	.672	30	–	27	–	1	.526
San Diego St^{‡} ‍‍‍^{y}	20	–	10	–	0	.667	42	–	21	–	0	.667
Fresno State ‍‍‍	18	–	12	–	0	.600	35	–	25	–	0	.583
Nevada ‍‍‍	13	–	16	–	0	.448	19	–	36	–	0	.345
Air Force ‍‍‍	12	–	17	–	0	.414	27	–	26	–	0	.509
San Jose State ‍‍‍	10	–	18	–	1	.362	19	–	35	–	1	.355
UNLV ‍‍‍	10	–	20	–	0	.333	20	–	36	–	0	.357
† – Conference champion ‡ – Tournament champion y – Invited to the NCAA tournament Rankings from Collegiate Baseball

2017 Northeast Conference baseball standings
	Conf.				Overall
Team	W		L	PCT	W		L	PCT
Bryant ‍†‍‍	20	–	6	.769	29	–	26	.527
Central Connecticut ‍‍‡‍^{y}	21	–	7	.750	36	–	22	.621
Wagner ‍‍‍	13	–	12	.520	22	–	28	.440
Sacred Heart ‍‍‍	14	–	13	.519	23	–	36	.390
LIU Brooklyn ‍‍‍	12	–	14	.462	22	–	28	.440
Fairleigh Dickinson ‍‍‍	8	–	18	.308	12	–	34	.261
Mount St. Mary's ‍‍‍	5	–	23	.179	8	–	39	.170
† – Conference champion ‡ – Tournament champion y – Invited to the NCAA tournament Rankings from Collegiate Baseball

2017 Ohio Valley Conference baseball standings
	Conf.				Overall
Team	W		L	PCT	W		L	PCT
Tennessee Tech ‍†‍‡‍^{y}	23	–	7	.767	41	–	21	.661
Morehead State ‍‍‍	18	–	11	.621	36	–	23	.610
Belmont ‍‍‍	17	–	13	.567	31	–	29	.517
Jacksonville State ‍‍‍	17	–	13	.567	30	–	26	.536
SE Missouri State ‍‍‍	16	–	14	.533	29	–	26	.527
Murray State ‍‍‍	15	–	15	.500	29	–	30	.492
Austin Peay ‍‍‍	13	–	16	.448	28	–	30	.483
Eastern Illinois ‍‍‍	12	–	18	.400	21	–	35	.375
Tennessee–Martin ‍‍‍	12	–	18	.400	25	–	30	.455
SIU Edwardsville ‍‍‍	11	–	19	.367	23	–	29	.442
Eastern Kentucky ‍‍‍	10	–	20	.333	24	–	32	.429
† – Conference champion ‡ – Tournament champion y – Invited to the NCAA tournament Rankings from Collegiate Baseball

2017 Pac-12 Conference baseball standings
	Conf.				Overall
Team	W		L	PCT	W		L	PCT
No. 3 Oregon State ‍†‍‍^{y}	27	–	3	.900	56	–	6	.903
No. 18 Stanford ‍‍‍^{y}	21	–	9	.700	42	–	16	.724
UCLA ‍‍‍^{y}	19	–	11	.633	30	–	27	.526
No. 24 Arizona ‍‍‍^{y}	16	–	14	.533	38	–	21	.644
California ‍‍‍	15	–	15	.500	25	–	29	.463
Utah ‍‍‍	15	–	15	.500	27	–	24	.529
Washington ‍‍‍	14	–	16	.467	28	–	26	.519
Oregon ‍‍‍	12	–	18	.400	30	–	25	.545
Washington State ‍‍‍	10	–	20	.333	24	–	29	.453
Arizona State ‍‍‍	8	–	22	.267	23	–	32	.418
USC ‍‍‍	8	–	22	.267	21	–	34	.382
† – Conference champion y – Invited to the NCAA tournament Rankings from Collegiate Baseball

2017 Southeastern Conference baseball standings
	Conf.						Overall
Team	W		L		T	PCT	W		L		T	PCT
Eastern
No. 1 Florida ^{x}‍†‍‍^{y}	21	–	9	–	0	.700	52	–	19	–	0	.732
No. 10 Kentucky ‍‍‍^{y}	19	–	11	–	0	.633	43	–	23	–	0	.652
No. 15 Vanderbilt ‍‍‍^{y}	15	–	13	–	1	.534	36	–	25	–	1	.589
Missouri ‍‍‍	14	–	16	–	0	.467	36	–	23	–	0	.610
South Carolina ‍‍‍	13	–	17	–	0	.433	35	–	25	–	0	.583
Georgia ‍‍‍	11	–	19	–	0	.367	25	–	32	–	0	.439
Tennessee ‍‍‍	7	–	21	–	0	.250	27	–	25	–	0	.519
Western
No. 2 LSU ^{x}‍†‍‡‍^{y}	21	–	9	–	0	.700	52	–	20	–	0	.722
No. 22 Arkansas ‍‍‍^{y}	18	–	11	–	0	.621	45	–	19	–	0	.703
No. 13 Mississippi State ‍‍‍^{y}	17	–	13	–	0	.567	40	–	27	–	0	.597
No. 8 Texas A&M ‍‍‍^{y}	16	–	14	–	0	.533	41	–	23	–	0	.641
No. 29 Auburn ‍‍‍^{y}	16	–	14	–	0	.533	37	–	26	–	0	.587
Ole Miss ‍‍‍	14	–	16	–	0	.467	32	–	25	–	0	.561
Alabama ‍‍‍	5	–	24	–	1	.183	19	–	34	–	1	.361
x – Division champion † – Conference champion ‡ – Tournament champion y – Invited to the NCAA tournament Rankings from Collegiate Baseball

2017 Southern Conference baseball standings
	Conf.				Overall
Team	W		L	PCT	W		L	PCT
Mercer ‍†‍‍	17	–	6	.739	39	–	17	.696
Western Carolina ‍‍‍	15	–	8	.652	28	–	28	.500
UNC Greensboro ‍‍‡‍^{y}	14	–	10	.583	36	–	24	.600
Furman ‍‍‍	14	–	10	.583	33	–	28	.541
Wofford ‍‍‍	13	–	11	.542	28	–	30	.483
Samford ‍‍‍	11	–	13	.458	33	–	26	.559
East Tennessee State ‍‍‍	9	–	15	.375	30	–	29	.508
The Citadel ‍‍‍	7	–	17	.292	16	–	35	.314
VMI ‍‍‍	7	–	17	.292	24	–	34	.414
† – Conference champion ‡ – Tournament champion y – Invited to the NCAA tournament Rankings from Collegiate Baseball

2017 Southland Conference baseball standings
	Conf.						Overall
Team	W		L		T	PCT	W		L		T	PCT
McNeese State ‍†‍‍	22	–	8	–	0	.733	37	–	20	–	0	.649
Southeastern Louisiana ‍‍‍^{y}	20	–	10	–	0	.667	37	–	22	–	0	.627
No. 14 Sam Houston State ‍‍‡‍^{y}	19	–	11	–	0	.633	44	–	23	–	0	.657
Houston Baptist ‍‍‍	18	–	12	–	0	.600	29	–	25	–	0	.537
Central Arkansas ‍‍‍	17	–	13	–	0	.567	34	–	26	–	0	.567
Stephen F. Austin ‍‍‍	17	–	13	–	0	.567	29	–	28	–	0	.509
Lamar ‍‍‍	16	–	14	–	0	.533	33	–	25	–	0	.569
New Orleans ‍‍‍	16	–	14	–	0	.533	30	–	28	–	1	.517
Nicholls State ‍‍‍	15	–	15	–	0	.500	29	–	27	–	0	.518
Texas A&M–Corpus Christi ‍‍‍	14	–	16	–	0	.467	22	–	32	–	0	.407
Northwestern State ‍‍‍	10	–	20	–	0	.333	20	–	34	–	0	.370
Incarnate Word * ‍‍‍	8	–	22	–	0	.267	20	–	36	–	0	.357
Abilene Christian * ‍‍‍	3	–	27	–	0	.100	13	–	43	–	0	.232
† – Conference champion ‡ – Tournament champion y – Invited to the NCAA tournament * Ineligible for league and NCAA tournaments due to transition from Division II; Rankings from Collegiate Baseball

2017 Southwestern Athletic Conference baseball standings
	Conf.				Overall
Team	W		L	PCT	W		L	PCT
East
Jackson State ^{x}‍†‍‍	20	–	4	.833	38	–	17	.691
Alabama State ‍‍‍	18	–	6	.750	31	–	25	.554
Alabama A&M ‍‍‍	9	–	15	.375	12	–	45	.211
Alcorn State ‍‍‍	7	–	17	.292	12	–	33	.267
Mississippi Valley State ‍‍‍	6	–	18	.250	7	–	34	.171
West
Grambling State ^{x}‍‍‍	15	–	9	.625	22	–	30	.423
Texas Southern ‍‍‡‍^{y}	14	–	10	.583	20	–	34	.370
Prairie View A&M ‍‍‍	11	–	13	.458	20	–	37	.351
Southern ‍‍‍	10	–	14	.417	17	–	27	.386
Arkansas–Pine Bluff ‍‍‍	10	–	14	.417	15	–	31	.326
x – Division champion † – Conference champion ‡ – Tournament champion y – Invited to the NCAA tournament Rankings from Collegiate Baseball

2017 Sun Belt Conference baseball standings
	Conf.						Overall
Team	W		L		T	PCT	W		L		T	PCT
East Division
Coastal Carolina^{x}^{†} ‍‍‍	22	–	7	–	1	.750	37	–	19	–	1	.658
No. 26 South Alabama^{‡}^{y} ‍‍‍	22	–	8	–	0	.733	40	–	21	–	0	.656
Georgia Southern ‍‍‍	18	–	12	–	0	.600	38	–	21	–	0	.644
Troy ‍‍‍	16	–	14	–	0	.533	31	–	25	–	0	.554
Georgia State ‍‍‍	10	–	20	–	0	.333	22	–	33	–	0	.400
Appalachian State ‍‍‍	8	–	22	–	0	.267	19	–	36	–	0	.345
West Division
UT Arlington^{x} ‍‍‍	20	–	10	–	0	.667	30	–	25	–	0	.545
Louisiana–Lafayette ‍‍‍	19	–	10	–	1	.650	35	–	21	–	1	.623
Arkansas State ‍‍‍	13	–	16	–	0	.448	28	–	27	–	0	.509
Texas State ‍‍‍	13	–	17	–	0	.433	29	–	30	–	0	.492
Little Rock ‍‍‍	11	–	18	–	0	.379	21	–	34	–	0	.382
Louisiana–Monroe ‍‍‍	6	–	24	–	0	.200	12	–	43	–	0	.218
x – Division champion † – Conference champion ‡ – Tournament champion y – Invited to the NCAA tournament Rankings from Collegiate Baseball

2017 West Coast Conference baseball standings
	Conf.						Overall
Team	W		L		T	PCT	W		L		T	PCT
Gonzaga ‍†‍‍	20	–	7	–	0	.741	33	–	20	–	0	.623
BYU ‍†‍‡‍^{y}	20	–	7	–	0	.741	38	–	21	–	0	.644
Loyola Marymount ^{†} ‍‍‍	20	–	7	–	0	.741	38	–	18	–	0	.679
Saint Mary's ‍‍‍	18	–	9	–	0	.667	37	–	20	–	0	.649
San Diego ‍‍‍	18	–	9	–	0	.667	35	–	18	–	1	.657
San Francisco ‍‍‍	11	–	16	–	0	.407	29	–	28	–	0	.509
Santa Clara ‍‍‍	9	–	18	–	0	.333	13	–	40	–	0	.245
Pepperdine ‍‍‍	8	–	19	–	0	.296	20	–	32	–	0	.385
Pacific ‍‍‍	6	–	21	–	0	.222	18	–	35	–	0	.340
Portland ‍‍‍	5	–	22	–	0	.185	10	–	41	–	1	.202
† – Conference champion ‡ – Tournament champion y – Invited to the NCAA tournament Rankings from Collegiate Baseball

2017 Western Athletic Conference baseball standings
	Conf.						Overall
Team	W		L		T	PCT	W		L		T	PCT
Grand Canyon* ‍†‍‍	20	–	4	–	0	.833	29	–	25	–	0	.537
New Mexico State ‍‍‍	19	–	5	–	0	.792	35	–	22	–	0	.614
Cal State Bakersfield ‍‍‍	14	–	10	–	0	.583	31	–	24	–	0	.564
Sacramento State ‍‍‡‍^{y}	12	–	12	–	0	.500	32	–	29	–	0	.525
Utah Valley ‍‍‍	11	–	13	–	0	.458	18	–	36	–	0	.333
Northern Colorado ‍‍‍	10	–	14	–	0	.417	24	–	30	–	0	.444
Seattle ‍‍‍	8	–	16	–	0	.333	20	–	35	–	1	.366
Texas–Rio Grande Valley ‍‍‍	7	–	17	–	0	.292	26	–	28	–	0	.481
Chicago State ‍‍‍	7	–	17	–	0	.292	11	–	41	–	0	.212
† – Conference champion ‡ – Tournament champion y – Invited to the NCAA tournament * Ineligible for league and NCAA tournaments due to transition from Division II; Rankings from Collegiate Baseball

=== Conference winners and tournaments ===
Of the 31 Division I athletic conferences that sponsor baseball, 29 end their regular seasons with a single-elimination tournament or a double-elimination tournament. The teams in each conference that win their regular season title are given the number one seed in each tournament. Two conferences, the Big West and Pac-12, do not hold a conference tournament. The winners of these tournaments, plus the Big West and Pac-12 regular-season champions, receive automatic invitations to the 2017 NCAA Division I baseball tournament.

Conference	Regular season winner	Conference Player of the Year	Conference Coach of the Year	Conference tournament	Tournament venue (city)	Tournament winner
America East Conference	Binghamton	Toby Handley (Stony Brook)	Tim Sinicki (Binghamton)	2017 America East Conference baseball tournament	Edward A. LeLacheur Park • Lowell, MA	UMBC
American Athletic Conference	UCF; Houston	Jake Scheiner (Houston) & Hunter Williams (Tulane)	Greg Lovelady (UCF)	2017 American Athletic Conference baseball tournament	Spectrum Field • Clearwater, FL	Houston
Atlantic 10 Conference	VCU	Logan Farrar (VCU)	Larry Sudbrook (St. Bonaventure)	2017 Atlantic 10 Conference baseball tournament	Billiken Sports Center • St. Louis, MO	Davidson
Atlantic Coast Conference	Atlantic – Louisville; Coastal – North Carolina	Brendan McKay (Louisville)	Dan McDonnell (Louisville)	2017 Atlantic Coast Conference baseball tournament	Louisville Slugger Field • Louisville, KY	Florida State
Atlantic Sun Conference	Jacksonville	Nick Rivera (Florida Gulf Coast)	Chris Hayes (Jacksonville)	2017 Atlantic Sun Conference baseball tournament	Melching Field at Conrad Park • DeLand, FL	Florida Gulf Coast
Big 12 Conference	TCU; Texas Tech	Hunter Hargrove (Texas Tech) & Evan Skoug (TCU)	Steve Rodriguez (Baylor)	2017 Big 12 Conference baseball tournament	Chickasaw Bricktown Ballpark • Oklahoma City, OK	Oklahoma State
Big East Conference	Creighton	Rylan Bannon (Xavier)	Ed Blankmeyer (St. John's)	2017 Big East Conference baseball tournament	TD Ameritrade Park • Omaha, NE	Xavier
Big South Conference	Winthrop	D. J. Artis (Liberty)	Tom Riginos (Winthrop)	2017 Big South Conference baseball tournament	Lexington County Baseball Stadium • Lexington, SC	Radford
Big Ten Conference	Nebraska	Jake Adams (Iowa)	Darin Erstad (Nebraska)	2017 Big Ten Conference baseball tournament	Bart Kaufman Field • Bloomington, Indiana	Iowa
Big West Conference	Long Beach State	Keston Hiura (UC Irvine)	Troy Buckley (Long Beach State)	No tournament, regular season champion earns auto bid		
Colonial Athletic Association	Northeastern	Casey Golden (UNCW)	Mike Glavine (Northeastern)	2017 Colonial Athletic Association baseball tournament	Brooks Field • Wilmington, NC	Delaware
Conference USA	Southern Miss	Dylan Burdeaux (Southern Miss)	Scott Berry (Southern Miss)	2017 Conference USA baseball tournament	MGM Park • Biloxi, MS	Rice
Horizon League	UIC	Rob Calabrese (UIC)	Mike Dee (UIC)	2017 Horizon League baseball tournament	Les Miller Field at Curtis Granderson Stadium • Chicago, IL	UIC
Ivy League	Gehrig - Columbia & Penn; Rolfe - Yale	Randell Kanamaru (Columbia)	John Stuper (Yale)	2017 Ivy League Baseball Championship Series	Campus Sites	Yale
Metro Atlantic Athletic Conference	Fairfield	Jake Lumley (Canisius)	Pat Carey (Iona)	2017 Metro Atlantic Athletic Conference baseball tournament	Sal Maglie Stadium • Niagara Falls, NY	Marist
Mid-American Conference	East – Kent State; West – Central Michigan	Tanner Allison (Western Michigan)	Jeff Duncan (Kent State)	2017 Mid-American Conference baseball tournament	Sprenger Stadium • Avon, OH	Ohio
Mid-Eastern Athletic Conference	Northern - Norfolk State; Southern - Bethune–Cookman	Alex Mauricio (Norfolk State)	Ben Hall (North Carolina A&T)	2017 Mid–Eastern Athletic Conference baseball tournament	Perdue Stadium • Salisbury, MD	Bethune–Cookman
Missouri Valley Conference	Missouri State	Jake Burger (Missouri State)	Keith Guttin (Missouri State)	2017 Missouri Valley Conference baseball tournament	Hammons Field • Springfield, MO	Dallas Baptist
Mountain West Conference	New Mexico	Danny Sheehan (San Diego State) & Jack Zoellner (New Mexico)	Ray Birmingham (New Mexico)	2017 Mountain West Conference baseball tournament	Santa Ana Star Field • Albuquerque, NM	San Diego State
Northeast Conference	Bryant	Mickey Gasper (Bryant)	Charlie Hickey (Central Connecticut)	2017 Northeast Conference baseball tournament	Dodd Stadium • Norwich, CT	Central Connecticut
Ohio Valley Conference	Tennessee Tech	Ben Fisher (Eastern Kentucky) & Niko Hulsizer (Morehead State)	Matt Bragga (Tennessee Tech)	2017 Ohio Valley Conference baseball tournament	Choccolocco Park • Oxford, AL	Tennessee Tech
Pac-12 Conference	Oregon State	Nick Madrigal (Oregon State)	Pat Casey (Oregon State)	No tournament, regular season champion earns auto bid		
Patriot League	Navy	Travis Blue (Navy)	Jim Foster (Army)	2017 Patriot League baseball tournament	Campus Sites	Holy Cross
Southeastern Conference	East – Florida; West – LSU	Brent Rooker (Mississippi State)	Nick Mingione (Kentucky)	2017 Southeastern Conference baseball tournament	Hoover Metropolitan Stadium • Hoover, AL	LSU
Southern Conference	Mercer	Bryson Bowman (Western Carolina)	Craig Gibson (Mercer)	2017 Southern Conference baseball tournament	Fluor Field at the West End • Greenville, SC	UNC Greensboro
Southland Conference	McNeese State	Taylor Schwaner (Southeastern Louisiana)	Justin Hill (McNeese State)	2017 Southland Conference baseball tournament	Constellation Field • Sugar Land, TX	Sam Houston State
Southwestern Athletic Conference	East – Jackson State; West – Grambling State	Marshawn Taylor (Grambling State)	James Cooper (Grambling State)	2017 Southwestern Athletic Conference baseball tournament	Wesley Barrow Stadium • New Orleans, LA	Texas Southern
The Summit League	Oral Roberts	Noah Cummings (Oral Roberts)	Ryan Folmar (Oral Roberts)	2017 Summit League baseball tournament	J. L. Johnson Stadium • Tulsa, OK	Oral Roberts
Sun Belt Conference	East – Coastal Carolina; West – UT Arlington	Billy Cooke (Coastal Carolina)	Darin Thomas (UT Arlington)	2017 Sun Belt Conference baseball tournament	J. I. Clements Stadium • Statesboro, GA	South Alabama
West Coast Conference	Gonzaga; BYU; Loyola Marymount	Riley Adams (San Diego)	Mark Machtolf (Gonzaga)	2017 West Coast Conference baseball tournament	Banner Island Ballpark • Stockton, CA	BYU
Western Athletic Conference	Grand Canyon	Garrison Schwartz (Grand Canyon)	Andy Stankiewicz (Grand Canyon)	2017 Western Athletic Conference baseball tournament	Hohokam Stadium • Mesa, AZ	Sacramento State

== College World Series ==
The 2017 College World Series began on June 17 in Omaha, Nebraska.

First round
1	Oregon State	6
Cal State Fullerton	5
Florida State	4
4	LSU	5
Cal State Fullerton	4
Florida State	6
3	Florida	3
6	TCU	0
7	Louisville	8
Texas A&M	4
6	TCU	4
Texas A&M	1

Second round
1	Oregon State	13
4	LSU	1
Florida State	4
4	LSU	7
3	Florida	5
7	Louisville	1
6	TCU	4
7	Louisville	3

Semifinals
1	Oregon State	1	1
4	LSU	3	6
3	Florida	2	3
6	TCU	9	0

Championship series
4	LSU	3	1	–
3	Florida	4	6	–

== Award winners ==
=== Major player of the year awards ===
- Dick Howser Trophy: Brendan McKay, 1B/P, Louisville
- Baseball America: Brendan McKay, 1B/P, Louisville
- Collegiate Baseball/Louisville Slugger: Brendan McKay, 1B/P, Louisville & Brent Rooker, 1B, Mississippi State
- American Baseball Coaches Association: Brendan McKay, 1B/P, Louisville
- Golden Spikes Award: Brendan McKay, 1B/P, Louisville

=== Major freshman of the year awards ===
- Baseball America Freshman Of The Year: Matt Wallner, OF/P, Southern Miss
- Collegiate Baseball Freshman Players of the Year: Kevin Milam, DH/P, Saint Mary's; Sean Mooney, P, St. John's; Braden Shewmake, 2B, Texas A&M; Kenyon Yovan, P, Oregon

=== Major coach of the year awards ===
- American Baseball Coaches Association: Kevin O'Sullivan, Florida
- Baseball America: Dan McDonnell, Louisville
- Collegiate Baseball Coach of the Year: Kevin O'Sullivan, Florida
- National Collegiate Baseball Writers Association (NCBWA) National Coach of the Year: Pat Casey, Oregon State
- ABCA/Baseball America Assistant Coach of the Year:

=== Other major awards ===
- Senior CLASS Award (baseball) (outstanding Senior of the Year in baseball): Anthony Critelli, Holy Cross
- Johnny Bench Award (Catcher of the Year):
- Brooks Wallace Award (Shortstop of the Year): Logan Warmoth, North Carolina
- John Olerud Award (best two-way player): Brendan McKay, Louisville
- American Baseball Coaches Association Gold Glove:

== Coaching changes ==
This table lists programs that changed head coaches at any point from the first day of the 2017 season until the day before the first day of the 2018 season.

Team	Former coach	Interim coach	New coach	Reason
Alabama	Greg Goff	None	Brad Bohannon	Fired
Bethune-Cookman	Jason Beverlin	Barrett Shaft	Jonathan Hernandez	Resigned
California	David Esquer	None	Mike Neu	Departed for Stanford
Cincinnati	Ty Neal	None	Scott Googins	Resigned
The Citadel	Fred Jordan	None	Tony Skole	Retired
Dayton	Tony Vittorio	None	Jayson King	Resigned
East Tennessee State	Tony Skole	None	Joe Pennucci	Departed for The Citadel
Louisiana-Monroe	Bruce Peddie	None	Mike Federico	Fired
Maryland	John Szefc	None	Rob Vaughn	Departed for Virginia Tech
North Florida	Smoke Laval	None	Tim Parenton	Fired
Oklahoma	Pete Hughes	None	Skip Johnson	Fired
Pacific	Mike Neu	None	Ryan Garko	Departed for California
San Jose State	Jason Hawkins	Brad Sanfilippo		Resigned
South Carolina	Chad Holbrook	None	Mark Kingston	Resigned
South Florida	Mark Kingston	None	Billy Mohl	Departed for South Carolina
Stanford	Mark Marquess	None	David Esquer	Retired
Tennessee	Dave Serrano	None	Tony Vitello	Resigned
Texas-Rio Grande Valley	Manny Mantrana	None	Derek Matlock	Resigned
Towson	Mike Gottlieb	None	Matt Tyner	Fired
UMass	Mike Stone	None	Matt Reynolds	Retired
Virginia Tech	Pat Mason	None	John Szefc	Fired
Xavier	Scott Googins	None	Billy O'Conner	Departed for Cincinnati

== Attendances ==
2016 teams with an average home attendance of at least 10,000:

Team	Total attendance	Home average
LSU Tigers	418,291	10,725
