= Troy Buckley =

American college baseball coach (born 1968)

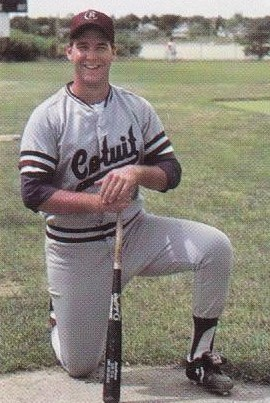
- Buckley in 1988

Current position
- Title: Pitching coach
- Team: Fresno State
- Conference: Pac-12

Biographical details
- Born: March 3, 1968 (age 58); Los Altos, California, U.S.

Playing career
- 1987–1989: Santa Clara
- Position: Catcher

Coaching career (HC unless noted)
- 1998–2000: Santa Clara (asst.)
- 2001–2007: Long Beach State (asst.)
- 2010: Long Beach State (asst.)
- 2011–2019: Long Beach State
- 2020–2022: Nevada (AHC/PC)
- 2023–present: Fresno State (PC)

Head coaching record
- Overall: 260–231–1
- Tournaments: NCAA: 9–7

Accomplishments and honors

Championships
- Big West (2017)

Awards
- Big West Coach of the Year (2017)

Troy William Buckley (born March 3, 1968) is an American college baseball coach and former catcher. He is the pitching coach for the Fresno State Bulldogs. He played college baseball at Santa Clara University from 1987 to 1989 for coach John Oldham. He served as the head coach at California State University, Long Beach from 2011 season until April 11, 2019. He has also coached in the minor league systems of the Pittsburgh Pirates and Montreal Expos.

== Playing career ==
Born in Los Altos, California, Buckley attended Bellarmine College Preparatory in San Jose, California, earning all-conference honors from the San Jose Mercury News as a senior in 1986. At Santa Clara University, Buckley played at catcher from 1987 to 1989 on the Santa Clara Broncos baseball team. Buckley earned West Coast Conference Player of the Year and second-team All-American honors in 1988. After the 1988 season, he played collegiate summer baseball with the Cotuit Kettleers of the Cape Cod Baseball League. He was drafted in the ninth round of the 1989 Major League Baseball draft by the Minnesota Twins. He played in the minor leagues from 1990 to 1995, rising as high as Class-AAA before turning to coaching.

== Coaching career ==
Buckley began coaching with the Montreal Expos Class AA affiliate as a hitting instructor and third base coach. After one season at Ottawa, he became a pitching coach for the GCL Expos. Santa Clara then hired him as pitching coach and recruiting coordinator, a post in which he served for three seasons before moving to Long Beach State in the same capacity. With the 49ers, Buckley coached future All Star Jered Weaver, among many others. Weaver won the Dick Howser Trophy and Roger Clemens Award for National Player of the Year and pitcher of the year in college baseball. The 49ers (also known as the Dirtbags) were among the nation's best in team ERA, finishing in the top 5 nationally three times.

In 2008, Buckley accepted the role of pitching coordinator for the Pittsburgh Pirates minor league system. He served in that role for two seasons before returning to Long Beach State as associate head coach. Buckley served in that role for one year before taking the head coaching role in 2011. In his three years back with the 49ers, the team ERA has improved from 4.67 to a Big West Conference-best 3.08 and finished above .500 in both seasons with Buckley as head coach.

On April 11, 2019, Long Beach State fired Buckley after the Dirtbags started the 2019 season 5–26, including 0–3 in conference games. Assistant coaches Greg Bergeron and Dan Ricabal became interim co-head coaches.

On July 9, 2019, Buckley was named the associate head coach and pitching coach at the University of Nevada, Reno.

On December 8, 2022, Buckley was named the pitching coach at Fresno State.

== Head coaching record ==
Below is a table of Buckley's yearly records as an NCAA head baseball coach.

Record table
Season	Team	Overall	Conference	Standing	Postseason
Long Beach State Dirtbags (Big West Conference) (2011–2019)
2011	Long Beach State	29–27	12–12	4th	
2012	Long Beach State	28–27	15–9	3rd	
2013	Long Beach State	29–27	15–12	T–4th	
2014	Long Beach State	34–26	17–7	2nd	NCAA Regional
2015	Long Beach State	28–26	11–13	6th	
2016	Long Beach State	38–22	15–9	3rd	NCAA Regional
2017	Long Beach State	42–20–1	20–4	1st	NCAA Super Regional
2018	Long Beach State	27–30	12–12	5th	
2019	Long Beach State	5–26 (Note: Buckley was dismissed from Long Beach State on April 11, 2019, three games into Big West play. The standings reflect the team's position at the time of Buckley's departure.)	0–3		
Long Beach State:		260–231–1	117–81		
Total:		260–231–1			
National champion Postseason invitational champion Conference regular season champion Conference regular season and conference tournament champion Division regular season champion Division regular season and conference tournament champion Conference tournament champion
