= Scott Googins =

American baseball coach

Biographical details
- Born: Granville, Ohio, U.S.
- Education: Ohio Wesleyan University '92

Playing career
- 1989–1992: Ohio Wesleyan
- Position: Catcher

Coaching career (HC unless noted)
- 1993–2000: Indiana (asst.)
- 2001–2004: Miami (OH) (asst.)
- 2005: Xavier (asst.)
- 2006–2017: Xavier
- 2018–2023: Cincinnati

Head coaching record
- Overall: 482–511
- Tournaments: NCAA: 7–10; Big East: 9–1; A-10: 12–11; AAC 5–6

Accomplishments and honors

Championships
- 3x Big East tournament: 2014, 2016, 2017 A-10: 2008 A-10 tournament: 2009 Big East: 2016 The American tournament: 2019

Awards
- ABCA Mideast Region Coach of the Year (2009); A-10 Coach of the Year (2008); Big East Coach of the Year (2016)

Scott Googins is an American college baseball coach who was most recently the head coach of the University of Cincinnati Bearcats Baseball Team. Googins was hired at Cincinnati on June 6, 2017, and resigned in May 2023 following the conclusion of the Bearcats' 2023 season, shortly after multiple assistants were fired for failing to report a sports gambling scandal. He left Xavier after being the skipper of the Musketeers baseball team since the start of the 2006 season. Under Googins, Xavier appeared in three NCAA tournaments. In 2008, he was named the A-10 Coach of the Year, and in 2009, he was named the ABCA Mideast Region Coach of the Year. Googins is an alumnus of Ohio Wesleyan University, where he played baseball for the Battling Bishops.

== Coaching career ==
=== Assistant coaching ===
After graduating from Ohio Wesleyan in 1992, Googins became an assistant at Indiana under head coach Bob Morgan. He held the position from 1993 to 2000. During his tenure, Indiana appeared in the 1996 NCAA tournament. He then worked as an assistant at Miami (OH) from 2001 to 2004, serving under head coach Tracy Smith, who had been Googins's fellow assistant at Indiana for two seasons. When Miami assistant Dan Simonds was tapped for the Xavier job following the 2004 season, Googins went with him as an assistant coach.

=== Xavier ===
After the 2005 season, Smith left Miami to succeed Morgan as Indiana's head coach, and Simonds went to Miami to take his place. Googins was promoted to replace Simonds at Xavier.

In 2008, Googins's third season, Xavier went 27–31 (19–8 A-10) and shared the A-10 regular season title with Charlotte. Googins was named the A-10 Coach of the Year. In that year's A-10 tournament, the Musketeers made the championship game but lost to Charlotte, 4–3 in 11 innings.

The following season, 2009, Xavier went 39–21 (18–9 A-10) and finished third in conference, qualifying for another A-10 tournament. There, the Musketeers won their opening game against Charlotte, 8–6, but lost their second to Rhode Island, 7–6. Having to go undefeated for the rest of the tournament, the Musketeers won four straight games to win the title and qualify for the 2009 NCAA tournament, the program's first. As the third seed at the Houston Regional, Xavier went 1–2, dropping games to second-seeded Kansas State and host Rice but beating fourth-seeded Sam Houston State in an elimination game. Googins was named the 2009 ABCA Mideast Region Coach of the Year.

In 2011, left-handed pitcher Ben Thomas became the first major-award winner of Googins's tenure when he was named A-10 Pitcher of the Year. In 2013, Charles Leesman, who played for Xavier from 2006 to 2008, became Googins's first player to appear in Major League Baseball when he debuted for the Chicago White Sox.

Xavier returned to the NCAA tournament in 2014, its first season in the new Big East Conference. Xavier had an average regular season, going 8–10 in Big East play and qualifying as the last team into the Big East tournament. While traveling to the tournament in Brooklyn, the team faced a flight delay, a flat tire on the bus to the hotel, and flooded hotel rooms. In the tournament itself, the fourth-seeded Musketeers dropped their opener to top-seeded Creighton, then won three straight games to win the championship and the conference's automatic bid. Googins said to reporters of reaching his second NCAA tournament: "I'm going to enjoy it this time. You don't realize that it doesn't happen all of the time. You can't take it for granted but I was really uptight the last time. Not that it's going to be loosey-goosey but we're going to go down there and it's another weekend. We're going to be ready to play but I'm going to enjoy it. It is a great experience." At the Nashville Regional, Xavier again went 1–2, losing games against Vanderbilt and Oregon but eliminating third-seeded Clemson.

=== Cincinnati ===
On May 31, 2023, Googins resigned in the wake of multiple assistants being fired for failing to report an NCAA violation related to sports gambling.

== Head coaching record ==
Below is a table of Googins's records as a collegiate head baseball coach.

Record table
Season	Team	Overall	Conference	Standing	Postseason
Xavier Musketeers (Atlantic 10 Conference) (2006–2013)
2006	Xavier	19–37	9–18	t-12th (14)	
2007	Xavier	29–31	17–10	4th (14)	A-10 tournament
2008	Xavier	27–31	19–8	t-1st (14)	A-10 tournament
2009	Xavier	39–21	18–9	3rd (14)	NCAA Regional
2010	Xavier	26–32	18–9	2nd (14)	A-10 tournament
2011	Xavier	30–26	14–10	4th (13)	A-10 tournament
2012	Xavier	28–28	13–11	7th (13)	
2013	Xavier	32–26	16–8	4th (15)	A-10 tournament
Xavier Musketeers (Big East Conference) (2014–2017)
2014	Xavier	30–29	8–10	4th (7)	NCAA Regional
2015	Xavier	15–38	3–15	7th (7)	
2016	Xavier	30–28	14–4	1st (7)	NCAA Regional Final
2017	Xavier	34–27	10–6	3rd (7)	NCAA Regional Final
Xavier:		339–354	159–118		
Cincinnati Bearcats (American Athletic Conference) (2018–2023)
2018	Cincinnati	28–28	12–12	6th	The American tournament
2019	Cincinnati	31–31	13–11	2nd	NCAA Regional
2020	Cincinnati	7–8	0–0		Season canceled due to COVID-19
2021	Cincinnati	29–26	18–14	4th	The American tournament
2022	Cincinnati	24–31	12-12	4th	The American tournament
2023	Cincinnati	24–33	10-14	T-5th	The American tournament
Cincinnati:		143–157	65–63		
Total:		482–511			
National champion Postseason invitational champion Conference regular season champion Conference regular season and conference tournament champion Division regular season champion Division regular season and conference tournament champion Conference tournament champion

== Personal ==
Googins is married to a former Xavier volleyball player and has three children, Ellie, Tommy, and Charlie. In a 2012 interview, he said that he is a Cincinnati Reds fan and enjoys 80s music.
