= Ben Hall (baseball) =

American baseball player and coach

Current position
- Title: Head coach
- Team: North Carolina A&T
- Conference: CAA
- Record: 229–361

Biographical details
- Born: August 9, 1983 (age 43); Johnson City, Tennessee, U.S.
- Education: Clemson University (BA); Wingate University (MBA)

Playing career
- 2003: Stetson
- 2004: Daytona State College
- 2005–2006: Clemson
- Position: Second baseman

Coaching career (HC unless noted)
- 2008–2009: Wingate (GA)
- 2010–2011: Wingate (assistant)
- 2012–2014: Winthrop (assistant)
- 2014: North Carolina A&T (assistant)
- 2015–present: North Carolina A&T

Head coaching record
- Overall: 229–361
- Tournaments: MEAC: 6–4; NCAA: 0–2

Accomplishments and honors

Championships
- MEAC Southern Division (2018, 2019); MEAC Tournament (2017)

Awards
- MEAC Coach of the Year (2017)

Benjamin David Hall (born August 9, 1983) is an American college baseball coach and former second baseman. He is the head baseball coach at North Carolina Agricultural and Technical State University. He played college baseball at Stetson University, Daytona State College and Clemson University from 2003 to 2006.

== Head coaching record ==
Record table
Season	Team	Overall	Conference	Standing	Postseason
North Carolina A&T Aggies (Mid-Eastern Athletic Conference) (2015–2021)
2015	North Carolina A&T	10–36	7–17	5th (Southern)	
2016	North Carolina A&T	13–41	6–18	5th (Southern)	
2017	North Carolina A&T	28–25	15–9	2nd (Southern)	Mid–Eastern Athletic tournament
2018	North Carolina A&T	32–25	16–8	1st (Southern)	NCAA Regional
2019	North Carolina A&T	29–24	16–8	1st (Southern)	Mid–Eastern Athletic tournament
2020	North Carolina A&T	7–9	0–0		Season canceled due to COVID-19
2021	North Carolina A&T	22–32	17–15	3rd (South)	
North Carolina A&T:			77–75		
North Carolina A&T Aggies (Big South Conference) (2022)
2022	North Carolina A&T	15–38	3–21	11th	
North Carolina A&T:			3–21		
North Carolina A&T Aggies (Colonial Athletic Association) (2023–present)
2023	North Carolina A&T	19–28	11–17	9th	
2024	North Carolina A&T	25–28	9–17	11th	
2025	North Carolina A&T	15–37	9–18	11th	
2026	North Carolina A&T	14–38	5–25	11th	
North Carolina A&T:		229–361	34–77		
Total:		229–361			
National champion Postseason invitational champion Conference regular season champion Conference regular season and conference tournament champion Division regular season champion Division regular season and conference tournament champion Conference tournament champion

== See also ==
- List of current NCAA Division I baseball coaches
