= Bruce Peddie =

American college baseball coach

Current position
- Title: Assistant coach
- Team: Saint Mary
- Conference: KCAC

Playing career
- 1984–1987: Mansfield

Coaching career (HC unless noted)
- 1989–1995: Mansfield (assistant)
- 1996–2006: Shippensburg
- 2007–2009: New Orleans (assistant)
- 2010–2013: New Orleans
- 2014: Louisiana–Monroe (assistant)
- 2014–2017: Louisiana–Monroe
- 2019–present: Saint Mary (assistant)

Head coaching record
- Overall: 444–527–3 (.457)

Bruce Peddie is an American college baseball coach and former player. He is an assistant baseball coach at the University of Saint Mary. Peddie played college baseball at Mansfield University of Pennsylvania from 1984 to 1987. He previously served as head baseball coach at the University of New Orleans from 2010 to 2013, and the head baseball coach for the University of Louisiana at Monroe, from 2014 to 2017. In 1994, Peddie managed the Harwich Mariners, a collegiate summer baseball team in the prestigious Cape Cod Baseball League.

== Head coaching record ==
Record table
Season	Team	Overall	Conference	Standing	Postseason
Shippensburgh Raiders (Pennsylvania State Athletic Conference) (1996–2006)
1996	Shippensburg	34–19–1			
1997	Shippensburg	16–27–1			
1998	Shippensburg	26–20			
1999	Shippensburg	34–22	16–8		
2000	Shippensburg	33–20	17–3		
2001	Shippensburg	27–23	16–8		
2002	Shippensburg	24–27–1	12–12		
2003	Shippensburg	31–22	14–7		
2004	Shippensburg	43–12	17–3		
2005	Shippensburg	32–25	12–8		
2006	Shippensburg	31–24	13–7		
Shippensburg:		255–175–1	117–56		
New Orleans Privateers (Sun Belt Conference) (2010)
2010	New Orleans	13–39	2–26		
New Orleans Privateers (Division I Independent) (2011)
2011	New Orleans	4–50			
New Orleans Privateers (Division II Independent) (2012)
2012	New Orleans	17–27			
New Orleans Privateers (Division I Independent) (2013)
2013	New Orleans	7–44			
New Orleans:		41–160	2–26		
Louisiana–Monroe Warhawks (Sun Belt Conference) (2014–2017)
2014	Louisiana–Monroe	15–19	10–14	T-8th	
2015	Louisiana–Monroe	25–29	12–18		
2016	Louisiana–Monroe	20–35	10–20		
2017	Louisiana–Monroe	12–43	6–24		
Louisiana–Monroe:		72–126	26–58		
Total:		444–527–3			
National champion Postseason invitational champion Conference regular season champion Conference regular season and conference tournament champion Division regular season champion Division regular season and conference tournament champion Conference tournament champion
