= 2017 VCU Rams baseball team =

American college baseball season

2017 VCU Rams baseball

Atlantic 10 regular season champions
- Conference: Atlantic 10 Conference
- Record: 35–22 (19-5 A-10)
- Head coach: Shawn Stiffler (5th season)
- Assistant coaches: Kurt Elbin (5th season); Steve Hay (3rd season); ML Morgan (3rd season)
- Home stadium: The Diamond

2017 Atlantic 10 Conference baseball standings
	Conf.				Overall
Team	W		L	PCT	W		L	PCT
VCU ‍†‍‍	19	–	5	.792	35	–	22	.614
Rhode Island ‍‍‍	17	–	6	.739	31	–	22	.585
St. Bonaventure ‍‍‍	15	–	8	.652	26	–	22	.542
George Washington ‍‍‍	14	–	10	.583	31	–	27	.534
Saint Louis ‍‍‍	12	–	10	.545	35	–	22	.614
No. 16 Davidson ‍‍‡‍^{y}	13	–	11	.542	35	–	26	.574
George Mason ‍‍‍	13	–	11	.542	26	–	33	.441
Saint Joseph's ‍‍‍	12	–	12	.500	21	–	25	.457
Fordham ‍‍‍	11	–	12	.478	27	–	24	.529
Dayton ‍‍‍	9	–	15	.375	20	–	35	.364
UMass ‍‍‍	8	–	16	.333	15	–	32	.319
Richmond ‍‍‍	6	–	17	.261	17	–	36	.321
La Salle ‍‍‍	4	–	20	.167	10	–	41	.196
† – Conference champion ‡ – Tournament champion y – Invited to the NCAA tournament Rankings from Collegiate Baseball

The 2017 VCU Rams baseball team was the program's 47th baseball season. It was their 5th season the Atlantic 10 Conference. The Rams began their season on February 17, 2017 with a 3–0 victory over Florida State.

== Personnel ==
=== 2017 roster ===
2017 VCU Rams Roster
Pitchers: 9 – Hayden Moore – Freshman; 10 – Connor Gillispie – Freshman; 18 – Tanner Winters – Junior; 20 – Sean Thompson – Junior; 23 – Matt Jamer – Senior; 24 – Eric Neiman – R-Freshman; 25 – Benjamin Dum – Sophomore; 28 – Jonathan Ebersole – Senior; 30 – Michael Dailey – Sophomore; 31 – Brooks Vial – Senior; 32 – Sam Donko – Senior; 33 – Sam Ryan – Freshman; 34 – Ryan Fox – Junior; 35 – Luke Crabb – Senior; 37 – David Mervis – R-Freshman; 38 – Garrett Pearson – Sophomore; 40 – Jack Alkire – Sophomore; 41 – Ben Nelson – Junior	Infielders: 1 – Steven Carpenter – Freshman; 2 – Paul Witt – Freshman; 4 – Daane Berezo – Senior; 7 – Brody Cook – Sophomore; 13 – Zach Ching – Freshman; 15 – Darian Carpenter – Senior; 26 – Mitchel Lacey – Junior; Utility: 3 – Brett Willett – Freshman; 11 – J.P. Vail – Sophomore	Catchers: 16 – Nick Rabat – Senior; 17 – Josh Simon – Freshman; 27 – Dylan Isquirdo – Senior; 36 – Matt Stallings – Freshman; Outfielders: 8 – Logan Farrar – Senior; 14 – Haiden Lamb – Junior; 12 – Alex Gransback – Senior; 21 – Austin Gregory – Freshman

== Schedule ==
Legend
VCU win
VCU loss
Postponement/cancellation

2017 VCU Rams baseball game log
Regular season

February (2–5)
#	Date	Opponent	Site/stadium	Score	Overall record	A10 Record
1	Feb 17	at Florida State	Dick Howser Stadium • Tallahassee, FL	W 3–0	1–0	–
2	Feb 18	at Florida State	Dick Howser Stadium • Tallahassee, FL	L 3–12	1–1	–
3	Feb 19	at Florida State	Dick Howser Stadium • Tallahassee, FL	L 3–11	1–2	–
4	Feb 24	at Charleston Southern	Buccaneer Ballpark • North Charleston, SC	W 13–4	2–2	–
5	Feb 25	at Charleston Southern	Buccaneer Ballpark • North Charleston, SC	L 9–11	2–3	–
6	Feb 26	at Charleston Southern	Buccaneer Ballpark • North Charleston, SC	L 2–4	2–4	–
7	Feb 28	Old Dominion; Rivalry	The Diamond • Richmond, VA	L 4–5 (10)	2–5	–

March (12–6)
#	Date	Opponent	Site/stadium	Score	Overall record	A10 Record
8	Mar 1	at Norfolk State	Marty L. Miller Field • Norfolk, VA	W 8–3	3–5	–
9	Mar 3	Fairfield	The Diamond • Richmond, VA	W 4–3	4–5	–
10	Mar 4	Fairfield	The Diamond • Richmond, VA	W 5–4 (13)	5–5	–
11	Mar 5	Fairfield	The Diamond • Richmond, VA	W 2–1	6–5	–
12	Mar 7	at North Carolina	Boshamer Stadium • Chapel Hill, NC	L 2–8	6–6	–
13	Mar 8	Norfolk State	The Diamond • Richmond, VA	W 5–2	7–6	–
14	Mar 10	Oakland	The Diamond • Richmond, VA	W 5–2	8–6	–
15	Mar 11	Oakland	The Diamond • Richmond, VA	W 4–2	9–6	–
16	Mar 12	Oakland	The Diamond • Richmond, VA	W 10–1	10–6	–
17	Mar 16	Marist	The Diamond • Richmond, VA	L 6–15	10–7	–
18	Mar 17	at UNC Wilmington	Brooks Field • Wilmington, NC	L 4–5	10–8	–
19	Mar 18	at UNC Wilmington	Brooks Field • Wilmington, NC	L 4–10	10–9	–
20	Mar 19	at UNC Wilmington	Brooks Field • Wilmington, NC	L 1–4	10–10	–
21	Mar 21	Longwood	The Diamond • Richmond, VA	W 5–4 (13)	11–10	–
22	Mar 24	La Salle	The Diamond • Richmond, VA	W 8–1	12–10	1–0
23	Mar 25	La Salle	The Diamond • Richmond, VA	W 7–0	13–10	2–0
24	Mar 26	La Salle	The Diamond • Richmond, VA	W 3–0	14–10	3–0
25	Mar 28	Virginia	The Diamond • Richmond, VA	L 2–4	14–11	–

April (13–5)
#	Date	Opponent	Site/stadium	Score	Overall record	A10 Record
26	Apr 1	George Washington	The Diamond • Richmond, VA	L 2–4	14–12	3–1
27	Apr 1	George Washington	The Diamond • Richmond, VA	W 11–2	15–12	4–1
28	Apr 2	George Washington	The Diamond • Richmond, VA	W 10–2	16–12	5–1
29	Apr 4	William & Mary	The Diamond • Richmond, VA	L 1–5	16-13	–
30	Apr 7	at UMass	Earl Lorden Field • Amherst, MA	W' 8–0	17-13	6-1
31	Apr 8	at UMass	Earl Lorden Field • Amherst, MA	W 2–0	18-13	7-1
32	Apr 9	at UMass	Earl Lorden Field • Amherst, MA	W 11–1	19-13	8-1
33	Apr 11	at Virginia	Davenport Field • Charlottesville, VA	L 4–9	19-14	–
34	Apr 14	Davidson	The Diamond • Richmond, VA	L 4–5	19-15	8-2
35	Apr 15	Davidson	The Diamond • Richmond, VA	W 14–0	20-15	9-2
36	Apr 16	Davidson	The Diamond • Richmond, VA	W 11–4	21-15	10-2
37	Apr 18	VMI	The Diamond • Richmond, VA	W 5–4	22-15	–
38	Apr 21	at Fordham	Jim Houlihan Park • The Bronx, NY	W 3–2	23-15	11-2
39	Apr 22	at Fordham	Jim Houlihan Park • The Bronx, NY	W 3–0	24-15	12-2
40	Apr 23	at Fordham	Jim Houlihan Park • The Bronx, NY	W 4–3	25-15	13-2
	Apr 25	at Longwood	Bolding Stadium • Farmville, VA	CANCELED	–	–
41	Apr 28	Saint Joseph's	The Diamond • Richmond, VA	W 7–6	26-15	14-2
42	Apr 29	Saint Joseph's	The Diamond • Richmond, VA	L 6–8	26-16	14-3
43	Apr 30	Saint Joseph's	The Diamond • Richmond, VA	W 5–4	27-16	15-3

May (6-4)
#	Date	Opponent	Site/stadium	Score	Overall record	A10 Record
44	May 2	at VMI	Gray–Minor Stadium • Lexington, VA	W 11–4	28-16	–
45	May 6	at Dayton	Woerner Field • Dayton, OH	L 2–4	28-17	15-4
46	May 6	at Dayton	Woerner Field • Dayton, OH	W 9–1	29-17	16-4
47	May 7	at Dayton	Woerner Field • Dayton, OH	L 6–7	29-18	16-5
48	May 10	at Old Dominion	Metheny Ballpark • Norfolk, VA	L 1–4	29-19	–
	May 12	Liberty	The Diamond • Richmond, VA	CANCELED	–	–
49	May 13	Liberty	The Diamond • Richmond, VA	W 5–4	30-19	–
50	May 14	Liberty	The Diamond • Richmond, VA	L 6–8	30-20	–
51	May 18	at Richmond; Capital City Classic	Pitt Field • Tuckahoe, VA	W 14–7	31-20	17-5
52	May 19	at Richmond; Capital City Classic	Pitt Field • Tuckahoe, VA	W 14–2	32-20	18-5
53	May 20	at Richmond; Capital City Classic	Pitt Field • Tuckahoe, VA	W 4–1	33-20	19-5

Atlantic 10 Tournament (2-2)
#	Date	Opponent	Site/stadium	Score	Overall record	Postseason Record
54	May 25	George Washington	Billiken Sports Center • St. Louis, MO	W 9–4	34-20	1-0
55	May 26	Davidson	Billiken Sports Center • St. Louis, MO	W 7–3	35-20	2-0
56	May 27	Davidson	Billiken Sports Center • St. Louis, MO	L 4–8	35-21	2-1
57	May 27	Davidson	Billiken Sports Center • St. Louis, MO	L 4–11	35-22	2-2

== Rankings ==
Ranking movements
	Week																			
Poll	Pre	1	2	3	4	5	6	7	8	9	10	11	12	13	14	15	16	17	18	Final
Coaches'		*																		
Baseball America																				
NCBWA†																				

† NCBWA ranks 30 teams in their preseason poll, but only ranks 25 teams weekly during the season.
* A new poll was not released for this week, so for comparison purposes, the previous week's ranking is inserted in this week's slot.
