= 2017 American Athletic Conference baseball tournament =

American college baseball tournament

- Tournament Logo
- Teams: 8
- Format: Double-elimination tournament
- Finals site: Spectrum Field; Clearwater, FL
- Champions: Houston (2nd title)
- Winning coach: Todd Whitting (2nd title)
- MVP: Jake Scheiner (Houston)
- Television: CBS Sports Network, ESPNU

2017 American Athletic Conference baseball standings
	Conf.				Overall
Team	W		L	PCT	W		L	PCT
UCF ‍†‍‍^{y}	15	–	9	.625	40	–	22	.645
No. 27 Houston ‍†‍‡‍^{y}	15	–	9	.625	42	–	21	.667
South Florida ‍‍‍^{y}	14	–	10	.583	42	–	19	.689
Connecticut ‍‍‍	14	–	10	.583	33	–	25	.569
Tulane ‍‍‍	13	–	11	.542	27	–	31	.466
Cincinnati ‍‍‍	10	–	14	.417	28	–	30	.483
Memphis ‍‍‍	8	–	16	.333	30	–	29	.508
East Carolina ‍‍‍	7	–	17	.292	32	–	28	.533
† – Conference champion ‡ – Tournament champion y – Invited to the NCAA tournament Rankings from Collegiate Baseball

The 2017 American Athletic Conference baseball tournament was held at Spectrum Field in Clearwater, Florida, from May 23 through 28. The event, held at the end of the conference regular season, determines the champion of the American Athletic Conference for the 2017 season. The winner of the double-elimination tournament will receive the conference's automatic bid to the 2017 NCAA Division I baseball tournament.

== Format and seeding ==
All eight baseball teams in The American will be seeded based on their records in conference play. The tournament will use a two bracket double-elimination format, leading to a single championship game between the winners of each bracket.

Team	W	L	Pct.	GB	Seed	Tiebreaker
UCF	15	9	.625	0	1	2–1 vs Houston
Houston	15	9	.625	0	2	1–2 vs UCF
Connecticut	14	10	.583	1	3	2–1 vs USF
South Florida	14	10	.583	1	4	1–2 vs UConn
Tulane	13	11	.542	2	5	
Cincinnati	10	14	.417	5	6	
Memphis	8	16	.333	7	7	
East Carolina	7	17	.292	8	8	

== Bracket ==
First round
1	UCF	3
8	East Carolina	14
4	South Florida	7
5	Tulane	6
1	UCF	8
5	Tulane	3
2	Houston	6
7	Memphis	5
3	Connecticut	12
6	Cincinnati	3
6	Cincinnati	14
7	Memphis	15^{10}

Second round
8	East Carolina	6
4	South Florida	5
1	UCF	12
4	South Florida	0
2	Houston	7
3	Connecticut	6
3	Connecticut	7
7	Memphis	5

Semifinals
8	East Carolina	4	-
1	UCF	0	-
2	Houston	13	-
3	Connecticut	3	-

Final
8	East Carolina	0
2	Houston	6
