= 2017 Big East Conference baseball tournament =

American college baseball tournament

- Teams: 4
- Format: Double-elimination tournament
- Finals site: TD Ameritrade Park; Omaha, NE
- Champions: Xavier (3rd title)
- Winning coach: Scott Googins (3rd title)
- MVP: Conor Grammes (Xavier)
- Television: Fox Sports 1 (final)

2017 Big East Conference baseball standings
	Conf.				Overall
Team	W		L	PCT	W		L	PCT
Creighton ‍†‍‍	11	–	4	.733	24	–	25	.490
St. John's ‍‍‍^{y}	13	–	5	.722	42	–	13	.764
Xavier ‍‍‡‍^{y}	10	–	6	.625	34	–	27	.557
Seton Hall ‍‍‍	10	–	8	.556	29	–	24	.547
Butler ‍‍‍	7	–	10	.412	31	–	20	.608
Villanova ‍‍‍	5	–	13	.278	14	–	33	.298
Georgetown ‍‍‍	4	–	14	.222	27	–	28	.491
† – Conference champion ‡ – Tournament champion y – Invited to the NCAA tournament Rankings from Collegiate Baseball

The 2017 Big East Conference baseball tournament was held at TD Ameritrade Park in Omaha, Nebraska, from May 25 through 28, 2017. The event, held at the end of the conference regular season, determined the champion of the Big East Conference for the 2017 season. The winner of the double-elimination tournament received the conference's automatic bid to the 2017 NCAA Division I baseball tournament.

== Format and seeding ==
The tournament used a double-elimination format and feature the top four finishers of the Big East's seven teams.

== Bracket ==
First round
1	Creighton	4
4	Seton Hall	1
2	St. John's	3
3	Xavier	13
Lower round 1
2	St. John's	3
4	Seton Hall	2

Semi-finals
3	Xavier	7
1	Creighton	6
Lower final
2	St. John's	10
1	Creighton	2

Finals
3	Xavier
2	St. John's
