= 2014 Big East Conference baseball tournament =

American college baseball tournament

- Teams: 4
- Format: Double-elimination tournament
- Finals site: MCU Park; Brooklyn, NY
- Champions: Xavier (1st title)
- Winning coach: Scott Googins (1st title)
- MVP: Mitch Elliott (Xavier)
- Television: Fox Sports 1 (final)

2014 Big East Conference baseball standings
	Conf.						Overall
Team	W		L		T	PCT	W		L		T	PCT
No. 30 Creighton ‍†‍‍	14	–	4	–	0	.778	32	–	17	–	1	.650
St. John's ‍‍‍	13	–	5	–	0	.722	35	–	20	–	0	.636
Seton Hall ‍‍‍	11	–	7	–	0	.611	38	–	15	–	0	.717
Xavier ‍‍‡‍^{y}	8	–	10	–	0	.444	30	–	29	–	0	.508
Butler ‍‍‍	7	–	11	–	0	.389	20	–	30	–	0	.400
Georgetown ‍‍‍	5	–	13	–	0	.278	19	–	29	–	0	.396
Villanova ‍‍‍	5	–	13	–	0	.278	16	–	34	–	0	.320
† – Conference champion ‡ – Tournament champion y – Invited to the NCAA tournament As of June 2, 2014; Rankings from Collegiate Baseball

The 2014 Big East Conference baseball tournament was held at MCU Park in Brooklyn, New York from May 21 through 25. The event, held at the end of the conference regular season, determined the champion of the Big East Conference for the 2013 season. Xavier won the event for the first time and earned the conference's automatic bid to the 2014 NCAA Division I baseball tournament.

== Format and seeding ==
The tournament used a modified double-elimination format and featured the top four finishers of the Big East's seven teams.

Team	W	L	Pct	GB	Seed
Creighton	14	4	.778	–	1
St. John's	13	5	.722	1	2
Seton Hall	11	7	.611	3	3
Xavier	8	10	.444	6	4
Butler	7	11	.389	7	–
Georgetown	5	13	.278	9	–
Villanova	5	13	.278	9	–

== Bracket ==
First round
1	Creighton	9
4	Xavier	2
2	St. John's	0
3	Seton Hall	1
Lower round 1
4	Xavier	8
2	St. John's	2

Semi-finals
1	Creighton	2
3	Seton Hall	1
Lower final
4	Xavier	5
3	Seton Hall	3

Finals
1	Creighton
4	Xavier

== All-Tournament Team ==
The following players were named to the All-Tournament Team.

Pos	Name	School
C	Dan Rizzie	Xavier
IF	Reagan Fowler	Creighton
IF	Robbie Knightes	St. John's
IF	Joe Forney	Xavier
IF	Jake Peter	Creighton
OF	Mike Gerber	Creighton
OF	Mitch Elliott	Xavier
OF	Zach Weigel	Seton Hall
DH	Derek Hasenbeck	Xavier
P	Trent Astle	Xavier
P	Sean Campbell	Xavier

=== Most Outstanding Player ===
Mitch Elliott was named Tournament Most Outstanding Player. Elliott was an outfielder for Xavier.
