= 2017 Colonial Athletic Association baseball tournament =

American college baseball tournament

- Teams: 6
- Format: Double-elimination tournament
- Finals site: Brooks Field; Wilmington, North Carolina
- Champions: Delaware (1st title)
- Winning coach: Jim Sherman (1st title)
- MVP: Jeremy Ake (Delaware)

2017 Colonial Athletic Association baseball standings
	Conf.				Overall
Team	W		L	PCT	W		L	PCT
Northeastern ‍†‍‍	16	–	7	.696	29	–	25	.537
UNC Wilmington ‍‍‍	16	–	8	.667	30	–	29	.508
William & Mary ‍‍‍	15	–	8	.652	32	–	25	.561
Delaware ‍‍‡‍^{y}	15	–	9	.625	34	–	23	.596
College of Charleston ‍‍‍	13	–	11	.542	28	–	31	.475
Elon ‍‍‍	12	–	12	.500	24	–	32	.429
James Madison ‍‍‍	7	–	17	.292	24	–	27	.471
Hofstra ‍‍‍	7	–	17	.292	14	–	37	.275
Towson ‍‍‍	6	–	18	.250	20	–	34	.370
† – Conference champion ‡ – Tournament champion y – Invited to the NCAA tournament As of June 30, 2017; Rankings from Collegiate Baseball

The 2017 Colonial Athletic Association baseball tournament was held at Brooks Field in Wilmington, North Carolina, from May 24 through 27, 2017. Fourth-seeded Delaware won the tournament for the first time and earned the Colonial Athletic Association's automatic bid to the 2017 NCAA Division I baseball tournament.

Entering the event, UNC Wilmington had won the most championships among active teams, with four. James Madison and William & Mary had claimed two titles, while Towson and fourth-year member College of Charleston each had one. Former member East Carolina won 7 titles during their tenure in the conference.

== Seeding and format ==
Continuing the format adopted in 2012, the top six finishers from the regular season competed in the double-elimination tournament, with the top two seeds earning first round byes.

Team	W	L	Pct	GB	Seed
Northeastern	16	7	.696	—	1
UNC Wilmington	16	8	.667	0.5	2
William & Mary	15	8	.652	1	3
Delaware	15	9	.625	1.5	4
College of Charleston	13	11	.542	3.5	5
Elon	12	12	.500	4.5	6
James Madison	7	17	.292	9.5	—
Hofstra	7	17	.292	9.5	—
Towson	6	18	.250	10.5	—

== Bracket ==
Upper round 1	Upper round 2	Upper final	Final
1	Northeastern	3
4	Delaware	9	4	Delaware	5
5	College of Charleston	0	4	Delaware	14
2	UNC Wilmington	8
2	UNC Wilmington	6
3	William & Mary	5	3	William & Mary	2
6	Elon	2
4	Delaware	10	—
2	UNC Wilmington	3	—
Lower round 1	Lower round 2	Lower round 3	Lower final
1	Northeastern	1
5	College of Charleston	5	2	UNC Wilmington	10
5	College of Charleston	7	1	Northeastern	8
5	College of Charleston	1	3	William & Mary	6
6	Elon	0 (Note: Elon pitchers Jordan Barrett and George Kirby threw a combined no-hitter, the first no-hitter in CAA tournament history. Elon lost the game, however, after College of Charleston scored the game's only run in the fifth inning without getting a hit.)

== All-Tournament Team ==
The following players were named to the All-Tournament Team.

Player	Team
Jeremy Ake	Delaware
Logan Beehler	UNC Wilmington
Jordan Glover	Delaware
Casey Golden	UNC Wilmington
Kyle Hinton	Delaware
Ryan Jeffers	UNC Wilmington
Carter Love	College of Charleston
Ron Marinaccio	Delaware
Brian Mayer	Delaware
Logan McRae	College of Charleston
Nick Patten	Delaware
Alex Royalty	UNC Wilmington

=== Most Valuable Player ===
Jeremy Ake was named Tournament Most Valuable Player. Ake was a shortstop for Delaware.
