= 2017 Metro Atlantic Athletic Conference baseball tournament =

- Teams: 6
- Format: Double-elimination
- Finals site: Sal Maglie Stadium; Niagara Falls, NY
- Champions: Marist (6th title)
- Winning coach: Chris Tracz (1st title)
- MVP: Tony Romanelli (Marist)

2017 Metro Atlantic Athletic Conference baseball standings
	Conf.				Overall
Team	W		L	PCT	W		L	PCT
Fairfield ‍†‍‍	17	–	7	.708	31	–	24	.564
Marist ‍‍‡‍^{y}	16	–	8	.667	32	–	23	.582
Canisius ‍‍‍	16	–	8	.667	35	–	22	.614
Iona ‍‍‍	14	–	10	.583	25	–	26	.490
Rider ‍‍‍	12	–	12	.500	24	–	28	.462
Manhattan ‍‍‍	12	–	12	.500	18	–	35	.340
Niagara ‍‍‍	12	–	12	.500	24	–	24	.500
Monmouth ‍‍‍	11	–	13	.458	20	–	28	.417
Quinnipiac ‍‍‍	11	–	13	.458	18	–	32	.360
Siena ‍‍‍	11	–	13	.458	20	–	28	.417
Saint Peter's ‍‍‍	0	–	24	.000	0	–	38	.000
† – Conference champion ‡ – Tournament champion y – Invited to the NCAA tournament Rankings from Collegiate Baseball

The 2017 Metro Atlantic Athletic Conference baseball tournament was held from May 24 through 28. The top six regular season finishers of the league's eleven teams met in the double-elimination tournament to be held at Sal Maglie Stadium in Niagara Falls, New York. Marist won their sixth tournament championship and earned the conference's automatic bid to the 2017 NCAA Division I baseball tournament.

== Seeding ==
The top six teams were seeded one through six based on their conference winning percentage. They then played a double-elimination tournament.

Team	W	L	Pct	GB	Seed
Fairfield	17	7	.708	—	1
Marist	16	8	.667	1	2
Canisius	16	8	.667	1	3
Iona	14	10	.583	3	4
Manhattan	12	12	.500	5	5
Rider	12	12	.500	5	6
Niagara	12	12	.500	5	—
Monmouth	11	13	.458	6	—
Quinnipiac	11	13	.458	6	—
Siena	11	13	.458	6	—
Saint Peter's	0	24	.000	17	—

== Results ==
Upper round 1	Upper round 2	Upper final	Final
1	Fairfield	12
3	Canisius	11	4	Iona	1
6	Rider	8	1	Fairfield	8
2	Marist	11
2	Marist	6
4	Iona	5	3	Canisius	2
5	Manhattan	1
2	Marist	5	—
4	Iona	1	—
Lower round 1	Lower round 2	Lower round 3	Lower final
4	Iona	7
4	Iona	5	1	Fairfield	6
6	Rider	2	3	Canisius	2
6	Rider	4	4	Iona	5
5	Manhattan	3

== All-Tournament Team ==
The following players were named to the All-Tournament Team.

Name	School
Michael Ginther	Canisius
Gage Lanning	Canisius
Jack Gethings	Fairfield
John Signore	Fairfield
Matt Byrne	Iona
Jared Finkel	Iona
Bill Maier	Iona
Scott Boches	Marist
Frankie Gregoire	Marist
Matt Pagano	Marist
Andrew Rouse	Marist

=== Most Valuable Player ===
Tony Romanelli, a junior pitcher for Marist, was named Tournament Most Valuable Player. He earned the save in each of Marist's three wins, including a four pitch strikeout in the final after entering with two outs and the bases loaded in the top of the ninth inning.
