= 2017 Big South Conference baseball tournament =

- Teams: 8
- Format: Double-elimination
- Finals site: Lexington County Stadium; Lexington, SC
- Champions: Radford (2nd title)
- MVP: Kyle Zurak (Radford)

2017 Big South Conference baseball standings
	Conf.				Overall
Team	W		L	PCT	W		L	PCT
Winthrop ‍†‍‍	17	–	7	.708	34	–	24	.586
Liberty ‍‍‍	16	–	8	.667	32	–	23	.582
Presbyterian ‍‍‍	15	–	9	.625	32	–	29	.525
High Point ‍‍‍	13	–	11	.542	30	–	23	.566
Radford ‍‍‡‍^{y}	11	–	13	.458	27	–	32	.458
Gardner–Webb ‍‍‍	11	–	13	.458	25	–	30	.455
UNC Asheville ‍‍‍	11	–	13	.458	25	–	32	.439
Campbell ‍‍‍	10	–	14	.417	25	–	32	.439
Charleston Southern ‍‍‍	9	–	15	.375	22	–	29	.431
Longwood ‍‍‍	7	–	17	.292	19	–	34	.358
† – Conference champion ‡ – Tournament champion y – Invited to the NCAA tournament Rankings from Collegiate Baseball

The 2017 Big South Conference baseball tournament was held from May 23 to 28. The top eight regular season finishers of the conference's ten teams met in the double-elimination tournament held at Lexington County Baseball Stadium in Lexington, South Carolina. The tournament champion earned the conference's automatic bid to the 2017 NCAA Division I baseball tournament.

== Seeding and format ==
The top eight finishers of the league's ten teams qualify for the double-elimination tournament. Teams are seeded based on conference winning percentage, with the first tiebreaker being head-to-head record.

== Results ==
First round
1	Winthrop	4
8	Campbell	3
4	High Point	3
5	Radford	6
8	Campbell	5
4	High Point	6
2	Liberty	7
7	Gardner Webb	16
3	Presbyterian	6
6	UNC Asheville	4
2	Liberty	1
6	UNC Asheville	2

Second round
1	Winthrop	1
5	Radford	7
1	Winthrop	14
4	High Point	13
7	Gardner Webb	6
3	Presbyterian	7
7	Gardner Webb	3
6	UNC Asheville	6

Semifinals
5	Radford	7	-
6	UNC Asheville	2	-
3	Presbyterian	3	9 ^{7}
1	Winthrop	4	4

Final
5	Radford	9
3	Presbyterian	2
