= Alex Faedo =

American baseball player (born 1995)

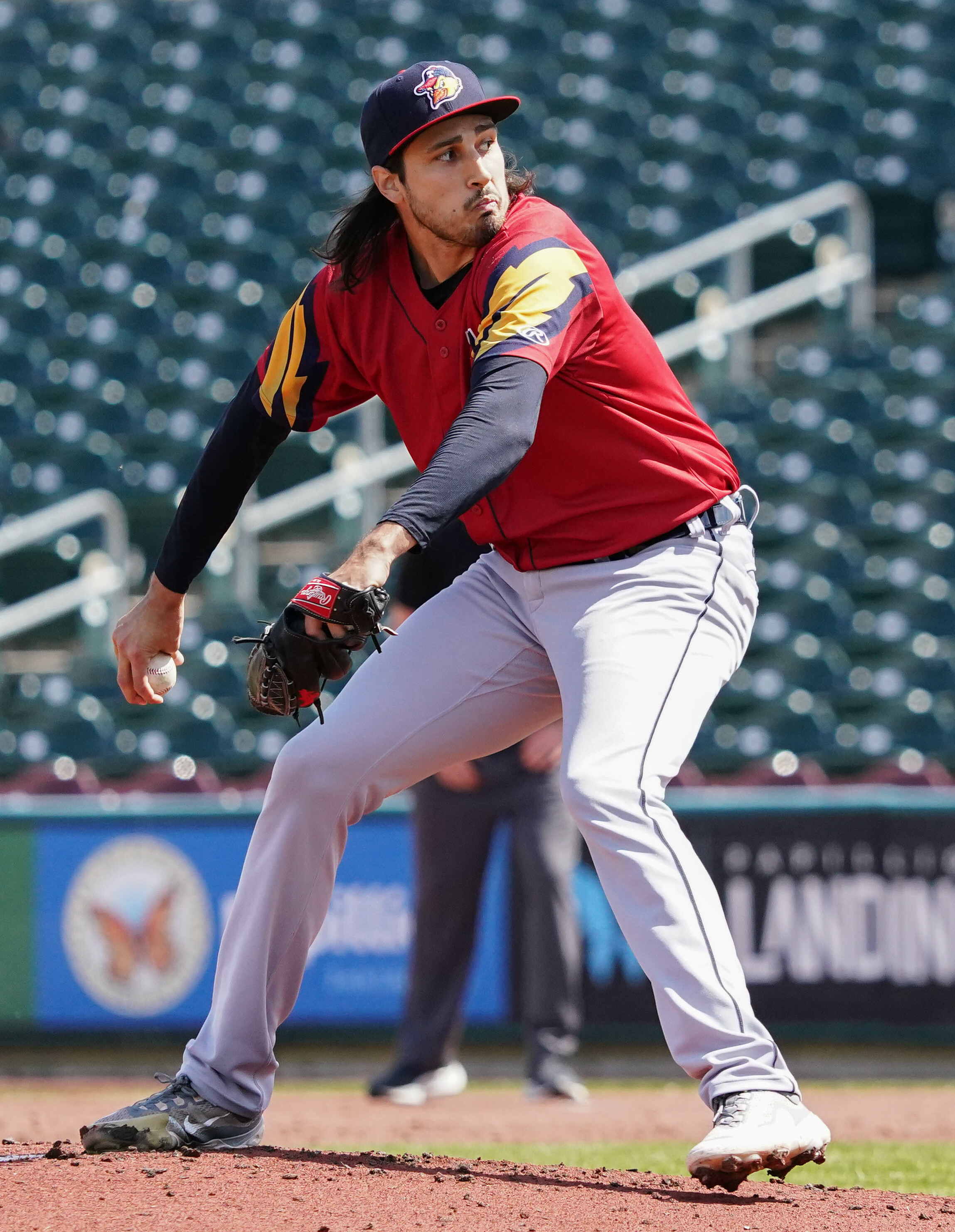
- Faedo with the Toledo Mud Hens in 2023

Free agent
- Pitcher
- Born: November 12, 1995 (age 30); Tampa, Florida, U.S.
- Bats: Right Throws: Right

MLB debut
- May 4, 2022, for the Detroit Tigers

MLB statistics (through 2024 season)
- Win–loss record: 8–13
- Earned run average: 4.51
- Strikeouts: 157
- Stats at Baseball Reference

Teams
- Detroit Tigers (2022–2024)

Alexander Michael Faedo (born November 12, 1995) is an American professional baseball pitcher who is a free agent. He has previously played in Major League Baseball (MLB) for the Detroit Tigers. He made his MLB debut in 2022.

== Amateur career ==
Faedo attended Braulio Alonso High School in Tampa, Florida. As a senior, he went 6–2 with a 0.58 earned run average (ERA) and 68 strikeouts in 48 innings. As a junior, he was 8–2 with a 1.15 ERA and threw a no-hitter. Faedo was drafted by the Detroit Tigers in the 40th round of the 2014 Major League Baseball draft, though did not sign and attended the University of Florida to play college baseball.

As a freshman at Florida in 2015, Faedo appeared in 17 games with 12 starts going 6–1 with a 3.23 ERA and 59 strikeouts. As a sophomore in 2016, he started 17 games and went 13–3 with a 3.18 ERA and 133 strikeouts. After the season, Faedo played for the United States collegiate national team. As a junior in 2017, he started 17 games during the regular season, and went 7–2 with a 2.60 ERA, with 132 strikeouts over 107 1/3 innings pitched, and helped lead Florida to the College World Series, and win their first National Championship. During the College World Series, Faedo allowed five hits and no runs, with 22 strikeouts in 14 1/3 innings against TCU. He was named to the All-Tournament Team and awarded the College World Series Most Outstanding Player.

== Professional career ==
=== Detroit Tigers ===
Faedo was again selected by the Detroit Tigers, in the first round, 18th overall, of the 2017 Major League Baseball draft. He signed with the Tigers, but did not make his professional debut in 2017 and sat out the season due to his workload at Florida. Faedo began the 2018 season with the Lakeland Flying Tigers of the High-A Florida State League. On June 18, the Tigers promoted Faedo to the Erie SeaWolves of the Double-A Eastern League. In 24 total starts between the two teams, he went 5–10 with a 4.02 ERA. Faedo returned to Erie to begin 2019. He made 22 starts for the 2019 SeaWolves, pitching to a 6–7 record with a 3.90 ERA and 134 strikeouts over 115 1/3 innings.

Faedo did not play in a game in 2020 due to the cancellation of the minor league season because of the COVID-19 pandemic. On November 20, 2020, the Tigers added Faedo to their 40-man roster to protect him from the Rule 5 draft. On December 19, the Tigers announced Faedo would undergo Tommy John surgery on his throwing elbow which would cause him to sit out the entire 2021 season.

Fully recovered from surgery, Faedo started the 2022 season back in Lakeland where he posted a 2.53 ERA in three appearances for the Flying Tigers before being sent to the Triple-A Toledo Mud Hens. After making just one start for Toledo, he was called up to the Tigers on May 4 and made his major league debut in the second game of a doubleheader against the Pittsburgh Pirates. He started and pitched five innings, allowing eight hits, two earned runs and one walk, while striking out one batter. He left the game with the score tied 2–2, receiving a no-decision. After making two starts, Faedo was returned to Toledo. He was brought up again by the Tigers on May 16, following an injury to Michael Pineda, starting in the May 16 game against the Tampa Bay Rays, near his childhood home, and gave up just one run in 5 2/3 innings. In his next start on May 22, Faedo earned his first major league win, allowing two runs in 5 1/3 innings against the Cleveland Guardians. Once Pineda returned from the injured list on July 1, Faedo was optioned back to Toledo. Faedo later suffered a right hip injury and missed the remainder of the season.

Faedo was optioned to Triple-A Toledo to begin the 2023 season. He was called up to the Tigers again on May 7. For the major league club in 2023, Faedo made 15 appearances (12 starts), posting a 2–5 record with a 4.45 ERA and 58 strikeouts in 64 2/3 innings.

Faedo began the 2024 season in the Tigers bullpen. Aside from serving as an opener in 6 games, Faedo spent the majority of the season pitching out of the bullpen. In 37 games, he recorded a 3.61 ERA with 55 strikeouts over 57 1/3 innings. Faedo was placed on the injured list with a right shoulder strain on August 22, and it was announced the next week that he had been ruled out for the remainder of the season.

On January 29, 2025, Faedo was designated for assignment by Detroit.

=== Tampa Bay Rays ===
On February 3, 2025, Faedo was traded to the Tampa Bay Rays in exchange for Enderson Delgado and cash considerations. Faedo was placed on the injured list to begin the season due to right shoulder inflammation; he was transferred to the 60-day injured list on April 18. Faedo was activated on November 3, and subsequently designated for assignment. He cleared waivers and elected free agency on November 6.

=== Los Angeles Angels ===
On May 21, 2026, Faedo signed a minor league contract with the Los Angeles Angels. In 21 games (2 starts) between Triple-A and rookie ball he threw 26.1 innings going 0-0 with a 3.76 ERA and 24 strikeouts. He elected free agency on November 2.

== Personal life ==
Faedo is the second cousin of former Minnesota Twins shortstop Lenny Faedo. His father, Landy Faedo, is a long-time high school baseball coach in the Tampa Bay area.
