= 2017 Northeast Conference baseball tournament =

- Teams: 4
- Format: Double-elimination tournament
- Finals site: Senator Thomas J. Dodd Memorial Stadium; Norwich, CT
- Champions: Central Connecticut (5th title)
- Winning coach: Charlie Hickey (5th title)
- MVP: TT Bowens (Central Connecticut)

2017 Northeast Conference baseball standings
| | Conf. | | | | Overall |
| Team | W | | L | PCT | W | | L | PCT |
|---|---|---|---|---|---|---|---|---|
| Bryant ‍†‍‍ | 20 | – | 6 | .769 | 29 | – | 26 | .527 |
| Central Connecticut ‍‍‡‍^{y} | 21 | – | 7 | .750 | 36 | – | 22 | .621 |
| Wagner ‍‍‍ | 13 | – | 12 | .520 | 22 | – | 28 | .440 |
| Sacred Heart ‍‍‍ | 14 | – | 13 | .519 | 23 | – | 36 | .390 |
| LIU Brooklyn ‍‍‍ | 12 | – | 14 | .462 | 22 | – | 28 | .440 |
| Fairleigh Dickinson ‍‍‍ | 8 | – | 18 | .308 | 12 | – | 34 | .261 |
| Mount St. Mary's ‍‍‍ | 5 | – | 23 | .179 | 8 | – | 39 | .170 |
† – Conference champion ‡ – Tournament champion y – Invited to the NCAA tournament Rankings from Collegiate Baseball

The 2017 Northeast Conference baseball tournament began on May 25 and ended on May 28 at Senator Thomas J. Dodd Memorial Stadium in Norwich, Connecticut. The league's top four teams finishers competed in the double elimination tournament. Central Connecticut won their fifth championship and claimed the Northeast Conference's automatic bid to the 2017 NCAA Division I baseball tournament.

Entering the event, Central Connecticut and Sacred Heart had won the most tournament championships among current members, while Fairleigh Dickinson and LIU Brooklyn had never won a championship.

== Seeding and format ==
The top four finishers were seeded one through four based on conference regular season winning percentage. They then played a double-elimination tournament.

| Team | W | L | Pct | GB | Seed |
|---|---|---|---|---|---|
| Bryant | 20 | 6 | .769 | — | 1 |
| Central Connecticut | 21 | 7 | .750 | — | 2 |
| Wagner | 13 | 12 | .520 | 6.5 | 3 |
| Sacred Heart | 14 | 13 | .519 | 6.5 | 4 |
| LIU Brooklyn | 12 | 14 | .462 | 8 | — |
| Fairleigh Dickinson | 8 | 18 | .308 | 12 | — |
| Mount Saint Mary's | 5 | 23 | .179 | 16 | — |

== Bracket ==
First round
1 | Bryant | 2
4 | Sacred Heart | 3
2 | Central Connecticut | 5
3 | Wagner | 4
Lower round 1
1 | Bryant | 5
3 | Wagner | 6

Semi-finals
4 | Sacred Heart | 4
2 | Central Connecticut | 10
Lower final
4 | Sacred Heart | 4^{12}
3 | Wagner | 3

Finals
2 | Central Connecticut | 6
4 | Sacred Heart | 3

== All-Tournament Team ==
The following players were named to the All-Tournament Team.

| Name | School |
|---|---|
| TT Bowens | Central Connecticut |
| Tyler Coleman | Central Connecticut |
| Tom Curtis | Central Connecticut |
| Franklin Jennings | Central Connecticut |
| Keith Klebart | Sacred Heart |
| Ted Shaw | Sacred Heart |
| James Taubl | Sacred Heart |

=== Most Valuable Player ===
TT Bowens was named Tournament Most Valuable Players. Bowens was a freshman first baseman for Central Connecticut who batted .636 and slugged 1.363 for the Tournament.
