= 2017 ASUN Conference baseball tournament =

American college baseball tournament

- Teams: 6
- Format: Double-elimination
- Finals site: Melching Field at Conrad Park; DeLand, Florida
- Champions: Florida Gulf Coast (1st title)
- Winning coach: Dave Tollett (1st title)
- MVP: Marc Coffers (=Florida Gulf Coast)

2017 ASUN Conference baseball standings
	Conf.				Overall
Team	W		L	PCT	W		L	PCT
Jacksonville ‍†‍‍	16	–	5	.762	36	–	24	.600
Stetson ‍‍‍	15	–	6	.714	27	–	29	.482
Florida Gulf Coast ‍‍‡‍^{y}	13	–	8	.619	43	–	20	.683
North Florida ‍‍‍	12	–	9	.571	33	–	24	.579
Kennesaw State ‍‍‍	10	–	11	.476	25	–	32	.439
Lipscomb ‍‍‍	9	–	12	.429	28	–	28	.500
USC Upstate ‍‍‍	7	–	14	.333	24	–	31	.436
NJIT ‍‍‍	2	–	19	.095	9	–	40	.184
† – Conference champion ‡ – Tournament champion y – Invited to the NCAA tournament As of June 30, 2017; Rankings from Collegiate Baseball

The 2017 ASUN Conference baseball tournament was held at Melching Field at Conrad Park on the campus of Stetson University in DeLand, Florida, from May 24 through 27. Third seeded Florida Gulf Coast won their first championship and claimed the ASUN Conference's automatic bid to the 2017 NCAA Division I baseball tournament.

This was the conference's first baseball tournament held under its current "ASUN" brand name, which was adopted at the start of the 2016–17 school year.

== Format and seeding ==
The 2017 tournament was a double-elimination tournament in which the top six conference members participated. Seeds were determined based on conference winning percentage from the round-robin regular season.

Team	W	L	Pct	GB	Seed
Jacksonville	16	5	.762	—	1
Stetson	15	6	.714	1	2
Florida Gulf Coast	13	8	.619	3	3
North Florida	12	9	.571	4	4
Kennesaw State	10	11	.476	6	5
Lipscomb	9	12	.429	7	6
USC Upstate	7	14	.333	9	—
NJIT	2	19	.095	14	—

== Bracket and results ==
First round
1	Jacksonville	8
6	Lipscomb	2
2	Stetson	5
5	Kennesaw State	10
3	Florida Gulf Coast	4
4	North Florida	0

Second round
1	Jacksonville	8
4	North Florida	5
3	Florida Gulf Coast	3
5	Kennesaw State	6
6	Lipscomb	8
2	Stetson	6

Third round
1	Jacksonville	8
5	Kennesaw State	4
6	Lipscomb	1
3	Florida Gulf Coast	3

Semifinals
5	Kennesaw State	5
3	Florida Gulf Coast	6

Final
1	Jacksonville	2	3
3	Florida Gulf Coast	4	4^{10}

== All-Tournament Team ==
The following players were named to the All-Tournament Team.

Pos	Name	School
P	Chris Gau	Jacksonville
	Kutter Crawford	Florida Gulf Coast
C	Mike Cassala	Jacksonville
IF	Austin Upshaw	Kennesaw State
IF	Grant Williams	Kennesaw State
IF	Scott Dubrule	Jacksonville
IF	Nick Rivera	FGCU
OF	Marc Coffers	Florida Gulf Coast
OF	Michael Gigliotti	Lipscomb
OF	Chris Lehane	Jacksonville
UTIL	Kenton Hering	Florida Gulf Coast

=== Most Valuable PLayer ===
Marc Coffers was named Tournament Most Valuable Player. Coffers was an outfielder for Florida Gulf Coast.
