= 2017 Atlantic 10 Conference baseball tournament =

American college baseball tournament

- Teams: 7
- Format: Double-elimination
- Finals site: Billiken Sports Center; St. Louis, Missouri
- Champions: Davidson (1st title)
- MVP: Alec Acosta and Durin O'Linger (Davidson)

2017 Atlantic 10 Conference baseball standings
	Conf.				Overall
Team	W		L	PCT	W		L	PCT
VCU ‍†‍‍	19	–	5	.792	35	–	22	.614
Rhode Island ‍‍‍	17	–	6	.739	31	–	22	.585
St. Bonaventure ‍‍‍	15	–	8	.652	26	–	22	.542
George Washington ‍‍‍	14	–	10	.583	31	–	27	.534
Saint Louis ‍‍‍	12	–	10	.545	35	–	22	.614
No. 16 Davidson ‍‍‡‍^{y}	13	–	11	.542	35	–	26	.574
George Mason ‍‍‍	13	–	11	.542	26	–	33	.441
Saint Joseph's ‍‍‍	12	–	12	.500	21	–	25	.457
Fordham ‍‍‍	11	–	12	.478	27	–	24	.529
Dayton ‍‍‍	9	–	15	.375	20	–	35	.364
UMass ‍‍‍	8	–	16	.333	15	–	32	.319
Richmond ‍‍‍	6	–	17	.261	17	–	36	.321
La Salle ‍‍‍	4	–	20	.167	10	–	41	.196
† – Conference champion ‡ – Tournament champion y – Invited to the NCAA tournament Rankings from Collegiate Baseball

The 2017 Atlantic 10 Conference baseball tournament was an American college baseball tournament that took place from May 24 to 27, 2017. The top seven regular season finishers of the Atlantic 10 Conference's twelve teams met in the double-elimination tournament held at Billiken Sports Center, the home field of Saint Louis. The winner earned the conference's automatic bid to the 2017 NCAA Division I baseball tournament. The Davidson Wildcats won 11–4 over the VCU Rams to win their first Atlantic 10 tournament championship. Davidson's Alec Acosta and Durin O'Linger shared the championship's most outstanding player award.

== Seeding and format ==
The tournament will use the same format adopted in 2014, with the top seven finishers from the regular season seeded one through seven. The top seed will receive a single bye while remaining seeds will play on the first day.

== Results ==
Upper round 1	Upper round 2	Upper final	Final
1	VCU	9
4	George Washington	4
4	George Washington	6
5	Saint Louis	4
1	VCU	7
6	Davidson	3
2	Rhode Island	5
7	George Mason	9
7	George Mason	3
6	Davidson	6
3	St. Bonaventure	2
6	Davidson	5
1	VCU	4	4
6	Davidson	8	11
Lower round 1	Lower round 2	Lower round 3	Lower final
5	Saint Louis	9
5	Saint Louis	3	7	George Mason	6	5	Saint Louis	7
3	St. Bonaventure	1	5	Saint Louis	4	6	Davidson	8 ^{(10)}
2	Rhode Island	2
2	Rhode Island	8
4	George Washington	4
