= 2017 Southern Conference baseball tournament =

- Teams: 9
- Format: two bracket Double-elimination tournament with championship game
- Finals site: Fluor Field at the West End; Greenville, SC
- Champions: UNC Greensboro (1st title)
- Winning coach: Link Jarrett (1st title)

2017 Southern Conference baseball standings
	Conf.				Overall
Team	W		L	PCT	W		L	PCT
Mercer ‍†‍‍	17	–	6	.739	39	–	17	.696
Western Carolina ‍‍‍	15	–	8	.652	28	–	28	.500
UNC Greensboro ‍‍‡‍^{y}	14	–	10	.583	36	–	24	.600
Furman ‍‍‍	14	–	10	.583	33	–	28	.541
Wofford ‍‍‍	13	–	11	.542	28	–	30	.483
Samford ‍‍‍	11	–	13	.458	33	–	26	.559
East Tennessee State ‍‍‍	9	–	15	.375	30	–	29	.508
The Citadel ‍‍‍	7	–	17	.292	16	–	35	.314
VMI ‍‍‍	7	–	17	.292	24	–	34	.414
† – Conference champion ‡ – Tournament champion y – Invited to the NCAA tournament Rankings from Collegiate Baseball

The 2017 Southern Conference baseball tournament was held from May 23 through 28 at Fluor Field at the West End in Greenville, South Carolina. The annual event determined the conference champion of the Division I Southern Conference in college baseball. The tournament winner earns the league's bid to the 2017 NCAA Division I baseball tournament. This is the last of 20 athletic championships held by the conference in the 2016–17 academic year.

The tournament was originally held from 1950–53, when the Southern Conference was a large conference composed of several small schools and several large schools, the latter of which would form the Atlantic Coast Conference after the 1953 season. The event was re-established in 1984 and has been held every year since. Defending champion Western Carolina has claimed ten championships, the most of any school, with The Citadel close behind at eight tournament wins. Furman is the only other school current school with multiple championships, having won two. East Tennessee State, UNC Greensboro, and VMI have never won a title, although East Tennessee State and VMI returned to the conference in 2015 after over ten years in other conferences. Mercer claimed the conference championship in its first ever appearance in 2015.

The tournament will be played in Greenville, which has hosted four of the past eight events.

== Seeding and format ==
All nine teams will participate in the tournament, with the bottom two seeds playing a single-elimination play-in round. The remaining teams will then be divided into two brackets and play double-elimination tournaments. The winners of each bracket will play a single championship game.

== Bracket ==
=== Play-In Round ===
Tuesday, May 23
Team	R
#9 VMI	8
#8 The Citadel	0

=== Double-elimination round ===
Upper round 1	Upper round 2	Upper final	Final
1	Mercer	11
9	VMI	6
1	Mercer	1
4	Furman	6
4	Furman	13^{7}
5	Wofford	3
4	Furman	8
3	UNC Greensboro	12
3	UNC Greensboro	6
6	Samford	3
3	UNC Greensboro	6
7	East Tennessee State	4
2	Western Carolina	6
7	East Tennessee State	8	3	UNC Greensboro	4	13 ^{7}
4	Furman	6	1
Lower round 1	Lower round 2	Lower round 3	Lower final
9	VMI	11
9	VMI	6^{10}	7	East Tennessee State	12	4	Furman	8
5	Wofford	5	7	East Tennessee State	16	7	East Tennessee State	6
6	Samford	6
6	Samford	5
6	Samford	6	1	Mercer	4
2	Western Carolina	1
