= 2017 Horizon League baseball tournament =

- Teams: 6
- Format: Double-elimination
- Finals site: Les Miller Field at Curtis Granderson Stadium; Chicago, Illinois
- Champions: UIC (5th title)
- Winning coach: Mike Dee (5th title)
- MVP: David Cronin (UIC)

2017 Horizon League baseball standings
	Conf.				Overall
Team	W		L	PCT	W		L	PCT
UIC ‍†‍‡‍^{y}	22	–	8	.733	39	–	17	.696
Wright State ‍‍‍	21	–	9	.700	38	–	21	.644
Northern Kentucky ‍‍‍	17	–	13	.567	25	–	33	.431
Valparaiso ‍‍‍	13	–	15	.464	24	–	29	.453
Oakland ‍‍‍	11	–	19	.367	17	–	40	.298
Milwaukee ‍‍‍	10	–	18	.357	22	–	32	.407
Youngstown State ‍‍‍	9	–	21	.300	15	–	40	.273
† – Conference champion ‡ – Tournament champion y – Invited to the NCAA tournament Rankings from Collegiate Baseball

The 2017 Horizon League baseball tournament was held from May 24 through 27 at Les Miller Field at Curtis Granderson Stadium in Chicago, home to conference regular-season champion UIC. The top six finishers of the league's seven teams met in the double-elimination tournament. UIC won the tournament to earn the conference's automatic bid to the 2017 NCAA Division I baseball tournament.

== Seeding and format ==
The league's teams were seeded 1 through 7 based on winning percentage in conference play. The last-place team did not qualify for the tournament, and the remaining six teams played a double-elimination tournament.

== Bracket ==
=== Play-in games ===
Team	R
#6 Milwaukee	5
#3 Northern Kentucky	11

Team	R
#5 Oakland	6
#4 Valparaiso	4

=== Remaining Bracket ===
First round
5	Oakland	0
1	UIC	8
3	Northern Kentucky	2
2	Wright State	12
Lower round 1
5	Oakland	12
3	Northern Kentucky	5

Semifinals
2	Wright State	1
1	UIC	4
Lower final
5	Oakland	4
2	Wright State	12

Finals
1	UIC
2	Wright State
