= 2017 Mountain West Conference baseball tournament =

- Teams: 4
- Format: Double-elimination
- Finals site: Santa Ana Star Field; Albuquerque, New Mexico
- Champions: San Diego State (4th title)
- Winning coach: Mark Martinez (2nd title)
- MVP: Andrew Martinez (San Diego State)

2017 Mountain West Conference baseball standings
	Conf.						Overall
Team	W		L		T	PCT	W		L		T	PCT
New Mexico ‍†‍‍	19	–	9	–	1	.672	30	–	27	–	1	.526
San Diego St^{‡} ‍‍‍^{y}	20	–	10	–	0	.667	42	–	21	–	0	.667
Fresno State ‍‍‍	18	–	12	–	0	.600	35	–	25	–	0	.583
Nevada ‍‍‍	13	–	16	–	0	.448	19	–	36	–	0	.345
Air Force ‍‍‍	12	–	17	–	0	.414	27	–	26	–	0	.509
San Jose State ‍‍‍	10	–	18	–	1	.362	19	–	35	–	1	.355
UNLV ‍‍‍	10	–	20	–	0	.333	20	–	36	–	0	.357
† – Conference champion ‡ – Tournament champion y – Invited to the NCAA tournament Rankings from Collegiate Baseball

The 2017 Mountain West Conference baseball tournament took place from May 24 through 28 at Santa Ana Star Field in Albuquerque, New Mexico, home field of the conference's regular-season champion New Mexico. The conference's top four teams from the regular season met in a double-elimination tournament. The winner of the tournament, San Diego State, earned the Mountain West Conference's automatic bid to the 2017 NCAA Division I baseball tournament.

== Format and seeding ==
The conference's top four teams were seeded based on winning percentage during the round-robin regular season schedule. The tournament opened with the top seed playing the lowest seeded team, and the second-seeded team playing the third seed, followed by double-elimination play until the champion was determined.

== Bracket ==
Upper round 1
1	New Mexico	7
4	Nevada	2
2	San Diego State	18
3	Fresno State	10
Lower round 1
4	Nevada	5
3	Fresno State	15^{7}

Upper final
1	New Mexico	8
2	San Diego State	9
Lower final
3	Fresno State	11
1	New Mexico	5

Final
2	San Diego State
3	Fresno State
