= 2017 Mid-Eastern Athletic Conference baseball tournament =

- Teams: 6
- Format: Double-elimination tournament
- Finals site: Arthur W. Perdue Stadium; Salisbury, MD
- Champions: Bethune-Cookman (16th title)
- Winning coach: Jason Beverlin (4th title)
- MVP: Danny Rodriguez (Bethune-Cookman)

2017 Mid-Eastern Athletic Conference baseball standings
	Conf.				Overall
Team	W		L	PCT	W		L	PCT
Northern
Norfolk State ^{x}‍†‍‍	16	–	7	.696	26	–	22	.542
Delaware State ‍‍‍	14	–	10	.583	22	–	25	.468
Maryland Eastern Shore ‍‍‍	9	–	15	.375	12	–	40	.231
Coppin State ‍‍‍	8	–	15	.348	11	–	31	.262
Southern
Bethune–Cookman ^{x}‍‍‡‍^{y}	15	–	8	.652	36	–	25	.590
North Carolina A&T ‍‍‍	15	–	9	.625	28	–	25	.528
Florida A&M ‍‍‍	14	–	10	.583	27	–	26	.509
North Carolina Central ‍‍‍	12	–	11	.522	22	–	28	.440
Savannah State ‍‍‍	3	–	21	.125	12	–	39	.235
x – Division champion † – Conference champion ‡ – Tournament champion y – Invited to the NCAA tournament Rankings from Collegiate Baseball

The 2017 Mid-Eastern Athletic Conference baseball tournament began on May 17 and ended on May 20 at Arthur W. Perdue Stadium, in Salisbury, MD. It was a six team double-elimination tournament. Bethune-Cookman won the tournament and claimed the Mid-Eastern Athletic Conference's automatic bid to the 2017 NCAA Division I baseball tournament. The Wildcats won their sixteenth tournament out of the nineteen events, with Florida A&M winning in 2015, Savannah State in 2013 and North Carolina A&T earning the 2005 title.

== Format and seeding ==
The top three teams in each division were seeded one through three based on regular season records. The two division winners earned a first round bye, with the second seed from each division playing the third seed from the opposite division in the first round. The winners advanced in the winners' bracket, while first round losers played elimination games.

North Division
Team	W	L	Pct	GB	Seed
Norfolk State	16	7	.696	—	1N
Delaware State	14	10	.583	2.5	2N
Maryland Eastern Shore	9	15	.375	7.5	3N
Coppin State	8	15	.348	8	—

South Division
Team	W	L	Pct	GB	Seed
Bethune-Cookman	15	8	.652	—	1S
North Carolina A&T	15	9	.625	0.5	2S
Florida A&M	14	10	.583	1.5	3S
North Carolina Central	12	11	.522	3	—
Savannah State	3	21	.125	12.5	—

== Bracket ==
First round Wednesday, May 17	Second round Thursday, May 18	Third round Friday, May 19	Championship; Saturday, May 20
1N	Norfolk State	5
2S	North Carolina A&T	8	2S	North Carolina A&T	4
3N	Maryland Eastern Shore	0	1N	Norfolk State	6
1S	Bethune-Cookman	16
1S	Bethune-Cookman	6
2N	Delaware State	2	3S	Florida A&M	5
3S	Florida A&M	12
1S	Bethune-Cookman	11	—
1N	Norfolk State	1	—
Lower round 1	Lower round 2	Lower round 3	Lower final
2S	North Carolina A&T	11
2N	Delaware State	4	1N	Norfolk State	12
2N	Delaware State	7	2S	North Carolina A&T	7
3N	Maryland Eastern Shore	5	3S	Florida A&M	4
2N	Delaware State	6

== All-Tournament Team ==
The following players were named to the All-Tournament Team.

Name	School
Evan Regez	Delaware State
Darnell Maisonet	Delaware State
Kyle Clary	North Carolina A&T State
Myles Sowell	North Carolina A&T State
Justin Burrell	Norfolk State
Devin Hemmerich	Norfolk State
Andre' Moore	Norfolk State
Stephen Baughan	Norfolk State
Danny Rodriguez	Bethune-Cookman
Austin Garcia	Bethune-Cookman
Anthony Maldonado	Bethune-Cookman
Demetrius Sims	Bethune-Cookman

=== Outstanding performer ===
Bethune-Cookman first baseman Danny Rodriguez was named Tournament Outstanding Performer.
