= 2017 NCAA Division I baseball tournament =

American college sports championship

- Season: 2017
- Teams: 64
- Finals site: TD Ameritrade Park; Omaha, Nebraska
- Champions: Florida Gators (1st title)
- Runner-up: LSU Tigers (16th CWS Appearance)
- Winning coach: Kevin O'Sullivan (1st title)
- MOP: Alex Faedo (Florida)
- Television: ESPN Networks

The 2017 NCAA Division I baseball tournament began on June 1, 2017, as part of the 2017 NCAA Division I baseball season. The 64-team, double-elimination tournament concluded with the 2017 College World Series (CWS) in Omaha, Nebraska. The CWS started on June 17 and ended on June 27.

The 64 participating NCAA Division I college baseball teams were selected out of an eligible 299 teams. Thirty-one teams were awarded an automatic bid as champions of their conferences, and 33 teams were selected at-large by the NCAA Division I Baseball Committee.

Teams were divided into sixteen regionals of four teams, which conducted a double-elimination tournament. Regional champions then faced each other in Super Regionals, a best-of-three-game series, to determine the eight participants in the College World Series.

== Bids ==
=== Automatic bids ===
School	Conference	Record (Conf)	Berth	Last NCAA Appearance
UMBC	America East	23–23 (11–9)	Tournament	2001 (Wilson Regional)
Houston	American	40–19 (15–9)	Tournament	2015 (Houston Regional)
Florida State	ACC	39–20 (14–14)	Tournament	2016 (Tallahassee Regional)
Florida Gulf Coast	Atlantic Sun	42–18 (13–8)	Tournament	First Appearance
Davidson	Atlantic 10	32–24 (13–11)	Tournament	First Appearance
Oklahoma State	Big 12	30–25 (8–14)	Tournament	2016 (Clemson Regional)
Xavier	Big East	32–25 (10–6)	Tournament	2016 (Nashville Regional)
Radford	Big South	27–30 (11–13)	Tournament	2015 (Nashville Regional)
Iowa	Big Ten	38–20 (15–9)	Tournament	2015 (Springfield Regional)
Long Beach State	Big West	37–17–1 (20–4)	Regular season	2016 (Coral Gables Regional)
Delaware	Colonial	34–21 (15–9)	Tournament	2001 (Columbus Regional)
Rice	Conference USA	31–29 (17–14)	Tournament	2016 (Baton Rouge Regional)
UIC	Horizon	39–15 (22–8)	Tournament	2008 (College Station Regional)
Yale	Ivy League	30–16 (16–4)	Championship series	1993 (Central I Regional)
Marist	Metro Atlantic	32–21 (16–8)	Tournament	2009 (Tallahassee Regional)
Ohio	Mid-American	31–26 (13–11)	Tournament	2015 (Champaign Regional)
Bethune–Cookman	Mid–Eastern	33–23 (15–8)	Tournament	2016 (Gainesville Regional)
Dallas Baptist	Missouri Valley	40–19 (15–6)	Tournament	2016 (Lubbock Regional)
San Diego State	Mountain West	41–19 (20–10)	Tournament	2015 (Lake Elsinore Regional)
Central Connecticut	Northeast	36–20 (21–7)	Tournament	2010 (Tallahassee Regional)
Tennessee Tech	Ohio Valley	40–19 (23–7)	Tournament	2009 (Clemson Regional)
Oregon State	Pac–12	49–4 (27–3)	Regular season	2015 (Dallas Regional)
Holy Cross	Patriot	23–25 (12–8)	Tournament	1978 (Northeast Regional)
LSU	Southeastern	43–17 (21–9)	Tournament	2016 (Baton Rouge Regional)
UNC Greensboro	Southern	35–22 (14–10)	Tournament	1997 (South I Regional)
Sam Houston	Southland	40–20 (19–11)	Tournament	2016 (Lafayette Regional)
Texas Southern	Southwestern Athletic	20–32 (14–10)	Tournament	2015 (College Station Regional)
Oral Roberts	Summit	42–14 (25–4)	Tournament	2016 (Fort Worth Regional)
South Alabama	Sun Belt	39–19 (22–8)	Tournament	2016 (Tallahassee Regional)
BYU	West Coast	37–19 (20–7)	Tournament	2002 (Los Angeles Regional)
Sacramento State	Western Athletic	32–27 (12–12)	Tournament	2014 (San Luis Obispo Regional)

=== By conference ===
Conference	Total	Schools
SEC	8	Arkansas, Auburn, Florida, Kentucky, LSU, Mississippi State, Texas A&M, Vanderbilt
ACC	7	Clemson, Florida State, Louisville, North Carolina, NC State, Virginia, Wake Forest
Big 12	7	Baylor, Oklahoma, Oklahoma State, TCU, Texas, Texas Tech, West Virginia
Big Ten	5	Indiana, Iowa, Maryland, Michigan, Nebraska
Pac-12	4	Arizona, Oregon State, Stanford, UCLA
American	3	Houston, South Florida, UCF
Big East	2	St. John's, Xavier
Big West	2	Cal State Fullerton, Long Beach State
Conference USA	2	Rice, Southern Miss
Missouri Valley	2	Dallas Baptist, Missouri State
Southland	2	Sam Houston State, Southeastern Louisiana
America East	1	UMBC
Atlantic 10	1	Davidson
Atlantic Sun	1	Florida Gulf Coast
Big South	1	Radford
Colonial	1	Delaware
Horizon	1	UIC
Ivy	1	Yale
MAAC	1	Marist
Mid-American	1	Ohio
MEAC	1	Bethune-Cookman
Mountain West	1	San Diego State
NEC	1	Central Connecticut
Ohio Valley	1	Tennessee Tech
Patriot	1	Holy Cross
Southern	1	UNC Greensboro
Summit	1	Oral Roberts
Sun Belt	1	South Alabama
SWAC	1	Texas Southern
West Coast	1	BYU
WAC	1	Sacramento State

== National seeds ==
The following eight teams automatically host a Super Regional if they advance to that round:

1. **Oregon State**
2. North Carolina †
3. **Florida**
4. **LSU**
5. Texas Tech †
6. **TCU**
7. **Louisville**
8. Stanford †

Bold indicates College World Series participant
† indicates teams that were eliminated in the Regional Tournament
‡ indicates teams that were eliminated in the Super Regional Tournament

== Regionals and Super Regionals ==
Bold indicates winner. Seeds for regional tournaments indicate seeds within regional. Seeds for super regional tournaments indicate national seeds only.

=== Corvallis Super Regional ===
Regional	Regional
1	**Oregon State**	**8**
4	Holy Cross	2
1	**Oregon State**	**11**
3	Yale	0
3	**Yale**	**5**
2	Nebraska	1
Corvallis Regional – Goss Stadium at Coleman Field
4	**Holy Cross**	**7**
2	Nebraska	4
4	Holy Cross	5
3	**Yale**	**9**
1	**Clemson**	**5**
4	UNC Greensboro	4
1	Clemson	4
2	**Vanderbilt**	**9**
3	St. John's	4
2	**Vanderbilt**	**13**
Clemson Regional – Doug Kingsmore Stadium
4	**UNC Greensboro**	**3**
3	St. John's	1
4	UNC Greensboro	3
1	**Clemson**	**6**

Regional Final
1	**Oregon State**	**8**	–
3	Yale	1	–
2	**Vanderbilt**	0	**8**
1	Clemson	**6**	0

Super Regional
1	**Oregon State**	**8**	**9**	–
Vanderbilt	4	2	–

=== Long Beach Super Regional ===
Regional	Regional
1	**Stanford**	**10**
4	Sacramento State	0
1	Stanford	1
2	**Cal State Fullerton**	**4**
3	BYU	2
2	**Cal State Fullerton**	**13**
Stanford Regional – Klein Field at Sunken Diamond
4	Sacramento State	1
3	**BYU**	**6**
3	BYU	1
1	**Stanford**	**9**
1	**Long Beach State**	**6**
4	San Diego State	0
1	Long Beach State	3
2	**Texas**	**5**^{12}
3	UCLA	2
2	**Texas**	**3**
Long Beach Regional – Blair Field
4	**San Diego State**	**3**
3	UCLA	2^{13}
4	San Diego State	4
1	**Long Beach State**	**7**

Regional Final
2	**Cal State Fullerton**	**4**	–
1	Stanford	2	–
2	Texas	3	1
1	**Long Beach State**	**4**	**2**

Super Regional
**Cal State Fullerton**	0	**12**	**2**
Long Beach State	**3**	0	1

=== Tallahassee Super Regional ===
Regional	Regional
1	**Texas Tech**	**5**
4	Delaware	2
1	**Texas Tech**	**6**
3	Sam Houston State	0
3	**Sam Houston State**	**5**
2	Arizona	4
Lubbock Regional – Dan Law Field at Rip Griffin Park
4	Delaware	5
2	**Arizona**	**6**^{12}
2	Arizona	3
3	**Sam Houston State**	**9**
1	Florida State	1
4	**Tennessee Tech**	**3**
4	Tennessee Tech	3
3	**Auburn**	**5**
3	**Auburn**	**7**
2	UCF	4
Tallahassee Regional – Mike Martin Field at Dick Howser Stadium
1	**Florida State**	**6**
2	UCF	1
1	**Florida State**	**5**
4	Tennessee Tech	3

Regional Final
1	Texas Tech	8	3
3	**Sam Houston State**	**9**	**4**
3	Auburn	7	0
1	**Florida State**	**8**^{10}	**6**

Super Regional
Sam Houston State	6	0	–
**Florida State**	**7**	**19**	–

=== Baton Rouge Super Regional ===
Regional	Regional
1	**LSU**	**15**
4	Texas Southern	7
1	**LSU**	**11**
2	Southeastern Louisiana	6
3	Rice	6
2	**Southeastern Louisiana**	**12**
Baton Rouge Regional – Alex Box Stadium
4	Texas Southern	6
3	**Rice**	**13**
3	**Rice**	**9**
2	Southeastern Louisiana	5
1	**Southern Miss**	**8**
4	UIC	7
1	**Southern Miss**	**8**
3	South Alabama	3
3	**South Alabama**	**6**
2	Mississippi State	3
Hattiesburg Regional – Pete Taylor Park
4	UIC	4
2	**Mississippi State**	**5**
2	**Mississippi State**	**7**
3	South Alabama	3

Regional Final
1	**LSU**	**5**	–
3	Rice	0	–
1	Southern Miss	1	6
2	**Mississippi State**	**8**	**8**

Super Regional
4	**LSU**	**4**	**14**	–
Mississippi State	3	4	–

=== Gainesville Super Regional ===
Regional	Regional
1	**Florida**	**10**
4	Marist	6
1	**Florida**	**5**
2	South Florida	1^{12}
3	Bethune-Cookman	1
2	**South Florida**	**9**
Gainesville Regional – Alfred A. McKethan Stadium
4	Marist	2
3	**Bethune-Cookman**	**4**
3	**Bethune-Cookman**	**6**
2	South Florida	4
1	**Wake Forest**	**11**
4	UMBC	3
1	**Wake Forest**	**4**
2	West Virginia	3
3	Maryland	1
2	**West Virginia**	**9**
Winston-Salem Regional – Gene Hooks Field at Wake Forest Baseball Park
4	UMBC	2
3	**Maryland**	**16**
3	Maryland	5
2	**West Virginia**	**8**

Regional Final
1	**Florida**	2	**6**
3	Bethune-Cookman	**6**	1
1	**Wake Forest**	**12**	–
2	West Virginia	8	–

Super Regional
3	**Florida**	**2**	6	**3**
Wake Forest	1^{11}	**8**^{11}	0

=== Fort Worth Super Regional ===
Regional	Regional
1	**TCU**	**9**
4	Central Connecticut State	6
1	**TCU**	**5**
2	Virginia	1
3	Dallas Baptist	3
2	**Virginia**	**6**
Fort Worth Regional – Lupton Stadium
4	Central Connecticut State	5
3	**Dallas Baptist**	**6**
3	**Dallas Baptist**	**11**
2	Virginia	8
1	**Arkansas**	**3**
4	Oral Roberts	0
1	Arkansas	4
2	**Missouri State**	**5**
3	Oklahoma State	5
2	**Missouri State**	**6**
Fayetteville Regional – Baum Stadium
4	**Oral Roberts**	**14**
3	Oklahoma State	6
4	Oral Roberts	3
1	**Arkansas**	**4**

Regional Final
1	**TCU**	**15**	–
3	Dallas Baptist	3	–
2	**Missouri State**	10	**3**
1	Arkansas	**11**	2

Super Regional
6	**TCU**	**3**	**8**	–
Missouri State	2	1	–

=== Louisville Super Regional ===
Regional	Regional
1	**Louisville**	**11**
4	Radford	6
1	**Louisville**	**11**
2	Oklahoma	1
3	Xavier	2
2	**Oklahoma**	**7**
Louisville Regional – Jim Patterson Stadium
4	Radford	1
3	**Xavier**	**3**
3	**Xavier**	**11**
2	Oklahoma	0
1	**Kentucky**	**6**
4	Ohio	4
1	Kentucky	4
3	**NC State**	**5**
3	**NC State**	**7**
2	Indiana	6^{12}
Lexington Regional – Cliff Hagan Stadium
4	Ohio	2
2	**Indiana**	**11**
2	Indiana	9
1	**Kentucky**	**14**

Regional Final
1	**Louisville**	**8**	–
3	Xavier	7	–
3	NC State	6	5
1	**Kentucky**	**8**	**10**

Super Regional
7	**Louisville**	**5**	**6**	–
Kentucky	2	2	–

=== College Station Super Regional ===
Hosted by Texas A&M at Olsen Field at Blue Bell Park

Regional	Regional
1	North Carolina	4
4	**Davidson**	**8**
4	**Davidson**	**2**
2	Florida Gulf Coast	1
3	Michigan	6
2	**Florida Gulf Coast**	**10**
Chapel Hill Regional – Boshamer Stadium
1	**North Carolina**	**8**
3	Michigan	1
1	**North Carolina**	**10**
2	Florida Gulf Coast	1
1	Houston	3
4	**Iowa**	**6**
4	Iowa	2
3	**Texas A&M**	**3**
3	**Texas A&M**	**8**
2	Baylor	5
Houston Regional – Schroeder Park
1	**Houston**	**17**
2	Baylor	3
1	**Houston**	**7**
4	Iowa	5

Regional Final
4	**Davidson**	**2**	–
1	North Carolina	1	–
3	**Texas A&M**	**4**	–
1	Houston	3	–

Super Regional
Davidson	6	6	–
**Texas A&M**	**7**^{15}	**12**	–

== College World Series ==
The College World Series was held at TD Ameritrade Park in Omaha, Nebraska.

=== Participants ===
School	Conference	Record (conference)	Head coach	Previous CWS Appearances	Best CWS Finish	CWS Record Not including this year
Cal State Fullerton	Big West	39–22 (15–9)	Rick Vanderhook	17 (last: 2015)	1st (1979, 1984, 1995, 2004)	34–29
Florida	SEC	47–18 (21–9)	Kevin O'Sullivan	10 (last: 2016)	2nd (2005, 2011)	14–21
Florida State	ACC	45–21 (14–14)	Mike Martin	21 (last: 2012)	2nd (1970, 1986, 1999)	28–42
Louisville	ACC	52–10 (23–6)	Dan McDonnell	3 (last: 2014)	5th (2007)	1–6
LSU	SEC	48–17 (21–9)	Paul Mainieri	17 (last: 2015)	1st (1991, 1993, 1996, 1997, 2000, 2009)	36–24
Oregon State	Pac-12	54–4 (27–3)	Pat Casey	5 (last: 2013)	1st (2006, 2007)	13–8
TCU	Big 12	47–16 (16–8)	Jim Schlossnagle	4 (last: 2016)	3rd (2010, 2015, 2016)	8–8
Texas A&M	SEC	41–21 (16–14)	Rob Childress	5 (last: 2011)	5th (1951, 1993)	2–10

=== Bracket ===
Seeds listed below (in the column before each team's name) indicate national seeds only

First round
1	**Oregon State**	**6**
Cal State Fullerton	5
Florida State	4
4	**LSU**	**5**
Cal State Fullerton	4
**Florida State**	**6**
3	**Florida**	**3**
6	TCU	0
7	**Louisville**	**8**
Texas A&M	4
6	**TCU**	**4**
Texas A&M	1

Second round
1	**Oregon State**	**13**
4	LSU	1
Florida State	4
4	**LSU**	**7**
3	**Florida**	**5**
7	Louisville	1
6	**TCU**	**4**
7	Louisville	3

Semifinals
1	Oregon State	1	1
4	**LSU**	**3**	**6**
3	**Florida**	2	**3**
6	TCU	**9**	0

Championship series
4	LSU	3	1	–
3	**Florida**	**4**	**6**	–

=== Game results ===
Date	Game	Winning team	Score	Losing team	Winning pitcher	Losing pitcher	Save	Notes
June 17	Game 1	Oregon State	6–5	Cal State Fullerton	Jake Mulholland (7–1)	Blake Workman (6–3)	Drew Rasmussen (2)	
June 17	Game 2	LSU	5–4	Florida State	Jared Poché (11–3)	Tyler Holton (10–3)	Zack Hess (2)	
June 18	Game 3	Louisville	8–4	Texas A&M	Brendan McKay (11–3)	Corbin Martin (7–4)	–	
June 18	Game 4	Florida	3–0	TCU	Alex Faedo (8–2)	Jared Janczak (9–1)	Michael Byrne (17)	
June 19	Game 5	Florida State	6–4	Cal State Fullerton	Chase Haney (3–2)	Jack Pabich (1–3)	Drew Carlton (7)	Cal State Fullerton eliminated
June 19	Game 6	Oregon State	13–1	LSU	Bryce Fehmel (6–2)	Eric Walker (8–2)	–	
June 20	Game 7	TCU	4–1	Texas A&M	Brian Howard (12–3)	Stephen Kolek (4–5)	Sean Wymer (2)	Texas A&M eliminated
June 20	Game 8	Florida	5–1	Louisville	Brady Singer (8–5)	Kade McClure (8–4)	–	
June 21	Game 9	LSU	7–4	Florida State	Jared Poché (12–3)	Cole Sands (6–4)	Zack Hess (3)	Florida State eliminated
June 22	Game 10	TCU	4–3	Louisville	Sean Wymer (6–4)	Nick Bennett (5–1)	–	Louisville eliminated
June 23	Game 11	LSU	3–1	Oregon State	Alex Lange (10–5)	Jake Thompson (14–1)	Zack Hess (4)	
June 23	Game 12	TCU	9–2	Florida	Charles King (1–3)	Jackson Kowar (12–1)	–	
June 24	Game 13	LSU	6–1	Oregon State	Caleb Gilbert (7–1)	Bryce Fehmel (6–3)	–	Oregon State eliminated
June 24	Game 14	Florida	3–0	TCU	Alex Faedo (9–2)	Jared Janczak (9–2)	Michael Byrne (18)	TCU eliminated
Finals
June 26	Game 1	Florida	4–3	LSU	Brady Singer (9–5)	Russell Reynolds (1–2)	Michael Byrne (19)	
June 27	Game 2	Florida	6–1	LSU	Tyler Dyson (4–0)	Jared Poché (12–4)	Jackson Kowar (1)	Florida wins CWS

=== All-Tournament Team ===
The following players were members of the College World Series All-Tournament Team.

Position	Player	School
P	**Alex Faedo (MOP)**	Florida
P	Brady Singer	Florida
C	Michael Papierski	LSU
1B	Drew Mendoza	Florida State
2B	Nick Madrigal	Oregon State
3B	Dylan Busby	Florida State
SS	Timmy Richards	Cal State Fullerton
OF	Antoine Duplantis	LSU
OF	Austin Langworthy	Florida
OF	Zach Watson	LSU
DH	Brendan McKay	Louisville

== Final standings ==
Seeds listed below indicate national seeds only

Place	School	Record
1st	No. 3 Florida	10–3
2nd	No. 4 LSU	9–3
3rd	No. 1 Oregon St	7–2
3rd	No. 6 TCU	8–2
5th	Florida State	7–3
5th	No. 7 Louisville	6–2
7th	Cal State Fullerton	5–3
7th	Texas A&M	5–2
9th	Davidson	3–2
9th	Kentucky	4–3
9th	Long Beach St.	5–3
9th	Mississippi State	4–3
9th	Missouri State	3–3
9th	Sam Houston St.	4–3
9th	Vanderbilt	3–3
9th	Wake Forest	4–2
17th	Arkansas	3–2
17th	Auburn	2–2
17th	Bethune–Cookman	2–2
17th	Clemson	3–2
17th	Dallas Baptist	2–2
17th	Houston	2–2
17th	NC State	2–2
17th	No. 2 North Carolina	2–2
17th	Rice	2–2
17th	Southern Miss	2–2
17th	No. 8 Stanford	2–2
17th	Texas	2–2
17th	No. 5 Texas Tech	2–2
17th	West Virginia	2–2
17th	Xavier	2–2
17th	Yale	2–2
33rd	Arizona	1–2
33rd	BYU	1–2
33rd	Florida Gulf Coast	1–2
33rd	Holy Cross	1–2
33rd	Indiana	1–2
33rd	Iowa	1–2
33rd	Maryland	1–2
33rd	Oklahoma	1–2
33rd	Oral Roberts	1–2
33rd	San Diego State	1–2
33rd	South Alabama	1–2
33rd	South Florida	1–2
33rd	Southeastern Louisiana	1–2
33rd	Tennessee Tech	1–2
33rd	UNC Greensboro	1–2
33rd	Virginia	1–2
49th	Baylor	0–2
49th	Central Connecticut State	0–2
49th	Delaware	0–2
49th	Marist	0–2
49th	Michigan	0–2
49th	Nebraska	0–2
49th	Ohio	0–2
49th	Oklahoma State	0–2
49th	Radford	0–2
49th	Sacramento State	0–2
49th	St. John's	0–2
49th	Texas Southern	0–2
49th	UCF	0–2
49th	UCLA	0–2
49th	UIC	0–2
49th	UMBC	0–2

== Record by conference ==
Conference	# of Bids	Record	Win %	Nc Record	Nc Win %	RF	SR	WS	NS	CS	NC
SEC	8	40–21	.656	36–17	.679	8	6	3	2	2	1
Big 12	7	15–14	.517	15–14	.517	4	1	1	1	–	–
Pac-12	4	10–8	.556	10–8	.556	2	1	1	1	–	–
ACC	7	25–15	.625	25–15	.625	6	3	2	–	–	–
Big West	2	10–6	.625	7–3	.700	2	2	1	–	–	–
Missouri Valley	2	5–5	.500	5–5	.500	2	1	–	–	–	–
Southland	2	5–5	.500	5–5	.500	1	1	–	–	–	–
Atlantic 10	1	3–2	.600	3–2	.600	1	1	–	–	–	–
Conference USA	2	4–4	.500	4–4	.500	2	–	–	–	–	–
American	3	3–6	.333	3–6	.333	1	–	–	–	–	–
Big East	2	2–4	.333	2–4	.333	1	–	–	–	–	–
Big Ten	5	3–10	.231	3–10	.231	–	–	–	–	–	–
Other	19	13–38	.255	13–38	.255	2	–	–	–	–	–

The columns RF, SR, WS, NS, CS, and NC respectively stand for the Regional Finals, Super Regionals, College World Series Teams, National Semifinals, Championship Series, and National Champion.

Nc is non–conference records, i.e., with the records of teams within the same conference having played each other removed.

== Media coverage ==
=== Radio ===
NRG Media provided nationwide radio coverage of the College World Series through its Omaha station KOZN, in association with Westwood One. It was streamed at westwoodonesports.com, on TuneIn, and on SiriusXM. Kevin Kugler and John Bishop called all games leading up to the Championship Series with Gary Sharp acting as the field reporter. The Championship Series was called by Kugler and Scott Graham with Bishop acting as field reporter.

=== Television ===
ESPN carried every game from the Regionals, Super Regionals, and College World Series across its networks. During the Regionals and Super Regionals ESPN offered a dedicated channel, ESPN Bases Loaded (carried in the same channel allotments as its "Goal Line" and "Buzzer Beater" services for football and basketball), which carried live look-ins and analysis across all games in progress.

==== Broadcast assignments ====
Regionals

- Steve Lenox and JT Snow: Stanford, California
- Jason Benetti and Todd Walker: Tallahassee, Florida
- Anish Shroff and Jay Walker: Lexington, Kentucky
- Roy Philpott and Rusty Ensor: Clemson, South Carolina
- "Jim Barbar". espnmediazone.com. Archived from the original on July 27, 2017. and JP Arencibia: Chapel Hill, North Carolina
- Mike Morgan and Nick Belmonte: Gainesville, Florida
- Richard Cross and David Dellucci: Hattiesburg, Mississippi
- Tom Hart and Chris Burke: Louisville, Kentucky

Super Regionals

- Tom Hart, Kyle Peterson, Chris Burke, and Laura Rutledge: Louisville, Kentucky
- Mike Morgan and Jay Walker: College Station, Texas
- Anish Shroff and Gabe Gross: Long Beach, California
- Jason Benetti and Mike Rooney: Corvallis, Oregon

College World Series

- Tom Hart, Chris Burke, Ben McDonald, and Mike Rooney: Afternoons, Wed night
- Karl Ravech, Eduardo Pérez, Kyle Peterson, and Laura Rutledge: Evenings minus Wed

Regionals

- Doug Sherman and John Gregory: Winston-Salem, North Carolina
- Trey Bender and Jerry Kindall: Lubbock, Texas
- Lowell Galindo and Keith Moreland: Houston, Texas
- Alex Perlman and Lance Cormier: Fayetteville, Arkansas
- Dave Neal and Ben McDonald: Baton Rouge, Louisiana
- Mike Couzens and Greg Swindell: Fort Worth, Texas
- Roxy Bernstein and Wes Clements: Corvallis, Oregon
- Clay Matvick and Kyle Peterson: Long Beach, California

Super Regionals

- Clay Matvick and Eduardo Pérez: Tallahassee, Florida
- Dari Nowkhah and Carlos Peña: Gainesville, Florida
- Lowell Galindo and Keith Moreland: Fort Worth, Texas
- Dave Neal and Ben McDonald: Baton Rouge, Louisiana

College World Series Championship Series

- Karl Ravech, Eduardo Pérez, Kyle Peterson, and Laura Rutledge
