= 2017 TCU Horned Frogs baseball team =

American college baseball season

2017 TCU Horned Frogs baseball

Big 12 Regular season Co-champion NCAA Fort Worth Regional champions NCAA Fort Worth Super Regional champions

College World Series
- Conference: Big 12 Conference

Ranking
- Coaches: No. 4
- CB: No. 4
- Record: 50–18 (16–8 Big 12)
- Head coach: Jim Schlossnagle (14th season)
- Assistant coaches: Bill Mosiello (4th season); Kirk Saarloos (5th season); Zach Etheredge (4th season)
- Home stadium: Lupton Stadium

2017 Big 12 Conference baseball standings
	Conf.				Overall
Team	W		L	PCT	W		L	PCT
No. 19 Texas Tech ‍†‍‍^{y}	16	–	8	.667	45	–	17	.726
No. 4 TCU ‍‍‍^{y}	16	–	8	.667	50	–	18	.735
Oklahoma ‍‍‍^{y}	12	–	11	.522	35	–	24	.593
Baylor ‍‍‍^{y}	12	–	12	.500	34	–	23	.596
West Virginia ‍‍‍^{y}	12	–	12	.500	36	–	26	.581
No. 28 Texas ‍‍‍^{y}	11	–	12	.478	39	–	24	.619
Kansas ‍‍‍	11	–	13	.458	30	–	28	.517
Oklahoma State ‍‍‡‍^{y}	8	–	14	.364	30	–	27	.526
Kansas State ‍‍‍	8	–	16	.333	29	–	26	.527
† – Conference champion ‡ – Conference Tournament champion y – Invited to the NCAA tournament Rankings from Collegiate Baseball

The 2017 TCU Horned Frogs baseball team represented Texas Christian University during the 2017 NCAA Division I baseball season. The Horned Frogs played their home games at Charlie & Marie Lupton Baseball Stadium as a member of the Big 12 Conference. They were led by head coach Jim Schlossnagle, the winningest coach in TCU baseball history, in his 14th year at TCU.

== Previous season ==
The Horned Frogs entered the 2017 season on the heels of three consecutive trips to the College World Series. The 2016 TCU Horned Frogs baseball team notched a 38–14 (15–9) regular season record to finish third in the Big 12 Conference standings. In the postseason, the Horned Frogs won the Big 12 tournament Championship with wins over Baylor, Oklahoma State, Texas and West Virginia, were selected as one of sixteen NCAA Regional Tournament hosts for the third year in a row and the sixth time in eight years, swept through the Fort Worth Regional with wins over Oral Roberts, Gonzaga and Arizona State; advanced to the Super Regional round of the Tournament for the third straight year, where they faced #4 National Seed Texas A&M in College Station, TX for the best-of-three series; won the College Station Super Regional after an 8–2 win, 1–7 loss and 4–1 win; and advanced to their third consecutive College World Series. At the 2016 CWS, the Frogs notched a 2–2 record, winning their first two games over Texas Tech and Coastal Carolina before losing two consecutive games to Coastal Carolina and being eliminated from the tournament. TCU finished the season with a 49–18 record and ranked third in the final polls.

== Preseason ==
=== MLB draft ===
The following Horned Frogs on the 2016 roster were selected in the 2016 Major League Baseball draft:

List of Drafted Players
Name	2016 Class	Pos.	Team	Round	No.	Signed/Returned
Brian Trieglaff	RS Junior	RHP	New York Yankees	13	398	Signed
Mitchell Traver	RS Junior	RHP	Cincinnati Reds	17	498	Returned
Brian Howard	Junior	RHP	Houston Astros	17	517	Returned
Rex Hill	Junior	LHP	Kansas City Royals	27	823	Signed
Elliott Barzilli	Junior	INF	Houston Astros	29	877	Returned
Preston Guillory	Senior	RHP	Miami Marlins	31	923	Signed*

* indicates draftee had no more college eligibility

=== Departed players ===
The following Horned Frogs on the 2016 roster departed the program prior to the 2017 season:

List of Departed Players
Name	2016 Class	Pos.	Reason
Zach Alaniz	Freshman	OF	Departed
Drew Gooch	Sophomore	LHP	Transferred to UT Arlington
Preston Guillory	Senior	RHP	Graduated and Drafted/Signed
Rex Hill	Junior	LHP	Drafted/Signed
Ryan Johnson	Sophomore	OF	Transferred to San Jacinto College
Dillon Meadows	Freshman	RHP	Transferred to Weatherford College
Zack Plunkett	Sophomore	C	Transferred to Arkansas
Devon Roedahl	Freshman	RHP	Transferred to San Jacinto College
Mitch Sewald	Junior	RHP	Transferred to LSU Eunice
Dane Steinhagen	Senior	OF	Graduated
Brian Trieglaff	RS Junior	RHP	Drafted/Signed

=== Summer leagues ===
Between the 2015–16 and 2016–17 academic years, the following 2017 Horned Frogs participated in summer collegiate baseball leagues:

List of Players in Summer Leagues
Player	2017 Class	Pos.	League	Team
Evan Skoug	Junior	C	USA Baseball	Collegiate National Team
Josh Watson	Sophomore	OF	Cape Cod Baseball League	Falmouth Commodores
Dalton Horton	Sophomore	LHP	Cape Cod Baseball League	Wareham Gatemen
Austen Wade	Junior	OF	Cape Cod Baseball League	Wareham Gatemen
Nolan Brown	RS Senior	OF	Cape Cod Baseball League	Yarmouth–Dennis Red Sox
Jared Janczak	RS Sophomore	RHP	Cape Cod Baseball League	Yarmouth–Dennis Red Sox
Connor Wanhanen	Junior	1B/OF	Cape Cod Baseball League	Yarmouth–Dennis Red Sox
Dalton Brown	Sophomore	RHP	New England Collegiate Baseball League	Sanford Mainers
Michael Landestoy	RS Junior	INF	New England Collegiate Baseball League	Sanford Mainers
Austin Boyles	RS Freshman	RHP	California Collegiate League	Orange County Riptide
Sean Wymer	Sophomore	RHP	California Collegiate League	Orange County Riptide

=== Recruiting class ===
The Horned Frogs added the following 11 players to the roster as part of their 2016 recruiting class:

List of 2016 Recruits
Name	2016 Class	Pos.	Previous School	Hometown
Cal Coughlin	Freshman	RHP/3B	Lake Forest H.S.	Lake Forest, IL
Alec Creel	Freshman	RHP	Homeschool	Wake Forest, NC
Jake Eissler	Freshman	RHP/1B	ThunderRidge H.S.	Littleton, CO
Haylen Green	Freshman	LHP	Lufkin H.S.	Lufkin, TX
Dion Henderson	Freshman	LHP	Oak Park H.S.	Detroit, MI
Zach Humphreys	Freshman	C	Midlothian H.S.	DeSoto, TX
Austin Ingraham	Junior	OF	North Central Texas College	Keller, TX
Charles King	Freshman	RHP	Coppell H.S.	Coppell, TX
Nick Lodolo	Freshman	LHP	Damien H.S.	La Verne, CA
Trey Morris	Freshman	RHP	Taylor H.S.	Katy, TX
Bryan Sturges	Freshman	C/OF	Seven Lakes H.S.	Katy, TX

=== Season projections ===
The 2017 Horned Frogs were projected as one of the "Eight for Omaha" in July 2016 by Baseball America, D1 Baseball and Perfect Game.

The Horned Frogs started the 2017 season as the unanimous preseason #1 club, also being picked to finish first in the Big 12 Conference.

== Personnel ==
=== Coaching staff ===
TCU returned its entire coaching staff from the Frogs' 2014, 2015 and 2016 College World Series seasons. After leading the Frogs to their third consecutive College World Series and being named Baseball America's 2016 National Coach of the Year, Jim Schlossnagle, the winningest coach in TCU Horned Frogs baseball history, inked a six-year contract extension worth over $1 million per year, and assistants Shane Mosiello and Kirk Saarloos inked multi-year contract extensions.

Name	Position	Season at TCU	Alma mater
Jim Schlossnagle	Head coach	14	Elon University (1992)
Bill Mosiello	Associate head coach	4	Fresno State University (1986)
Kirk Saarloos	Assistant coach	5	California State University, Fullerton (2001)
Zach Etheredge	Volunteer Assistant Coach	4	University of Texas at San Antonio (2008)

=== Roster ===
2017 TCU Horned Frogs baseball team
Players
Coaches

#	Pos.	Name	B/T	Height	Weight	Year	Previous school	Home town
1	INF	Mason Hesse	R/R	5 ft 9 in (1.75 m)	155 lb (70 kg)	Sr	Navarro College	Temple, TX
3	INF	Elliott Barzilli	R/R	6 ft 1 in (1.85 m)	175 lb (79 kg)	Sr	Georgia Tech	Los Angeles, CA
4	INF	Cam Warner	R/R	6 ft 2 in (1.88 m)	188 lb (85 kg)	Sr	Hill College	Canberra, Australia
5	INF	Ryan Merrill	L/R	5 ft 11 in (1.8 m)	185 lb (84 kg)	Sr	Iowa Western C.C.	Omaha, NE
6	OF	Nolan Brown	L/L	5 ft 11 in (1.8 m)	175 lb (79 kg)	RS Sr	Blinn College	Colleyville, TX
7	OF	Josh Watson	S/R	5 ft 11 in (1.8 m)	195 lb (88 kg)	So	Arlington Martin, H.S.	Arlington, TX
8	OF	Austen Wade	L/L	6 ft 1 in (1.85 m)	185 lb (84 kg)	Jr	Midland H.S.	Midland, TX
9	C	Evan Skoug	L/R	5 ft 11 in (1.8 m)	200 lb (91 kg)	Jr	Libertyville H.S.	Libertyville, IL
10	INF	Zach Humphreys	R/R	5 ft 10 in (1.78 m)	185 lb (84 kg)	Fr	Midlothian H.S.	DeSoto, TX
11	LHP	Dalton Horton	L/L	6 ft 4 in (1.93 m)	210 lb (95 kg)	So	Center H.S.	Center, TX
12	LHP	Nick Lodolo	L/L	6 ft 6 in (1.98 m)	185 lb (84 kg)	Fr	Damien H.S.	LaVerne, CA
13	INF	Michael Landestoy	R/R	6 ft 3 in (1.91 m)	195 lb (88 kg)	RS Jr	Saint George School	Santo Domingo, D.R.
15	RHP	Durbin Feltman	R/R	6 ft 0 in (1.83 m)	190 lb (86 kg)	So	Oak Ridge, H.S.	Conroe, TX
16	INF	Connor Wanhanen	L/R	6 ft 2 in (1.88 m)	195 lb (88 kg)	Jr	Flower Mound H.S.	Flower Mound, TX
19	INF	Luken Baker (injured)	R/R	6 ft 4 in (1.93 m)	265 lb (120 kg)	So	Oak Ridge, H.S.	Spring, TX
20	INF	Cal Coughlin	S/R	6 ft 1 in (1.85 m)	205 lb (93 kg)	Fr	Lake Forest H.S.	Lake Forest, IL
21	RHP	Charles King	R/R	6 ft 5 in (1.96 m)	215 lb (98 kg)	Fr	Coppell H.S.	Coppell, TX
23	INF	Haylen Green	L/L	5 ft 11 in (1.8 m)	180 lb (82 kg)	Fr	Lufkin H.S.	Lufkin, TX
24	RHP	Jake Eissler	R/R	6 ft 1 in (1.85 m)	205 lb (93 kg)	Fr	Thunder Ridge H.S.	Littleton, CO
25	INF	Trent Franson	R/R	5 ft 10 in (1.78 m)	180 lb (82 kg)	So	Lutheran South Academy	Houston, TX
26	RHP	Sean Wymer	R/R	6 ft 1 in (1.85 m)	190 lb (86 kg)	So	Flower Mound H.S.	Flower Mound, TX
27	OF	Evan Williams	L/R	6 ft 0 in (1.83 m)	175 lb (79 kg)	RS Sr	McLennan C.C.	McKinney, TX
30	RHP	Alec Creel	R/R	6 ft 2 in (1.88 m)	205 lb (93 kg)	Sr	Home School	Wake Forest, NC
31	RHP	Dalton Brown	R/R	6 ft 1 in (1.85 m)	204 lb (93 kg)	So	Arlington Heights H.S.	Benbrook, TX
33	RHP	Mitchell Traver	R/R	6 ft 7 in (2.01 m)	255 lb (116 kg)	RS Sr	Houston Christian H.S.	Sugar Land, TX
34	RHP	Trey Morris	R/R	6 ft 5 in (1.96 m)	207 lb (94 kg)	Fr	Taylor H.S.	Katy, TX
35		Bryan Sturges	R/R	5 ft 10 in (1.78 m)	200 lb (91 kg)	Fr	Klein Collins H.S.	Spring, TX
37	RHP	Austin Boyles	R/R	6 ft 2 in (1.88 m)	187 lb (85 kg)	RS Fr	Klein Collins H.S.	Spring, TX
38	OF	Austin Ingraham	R/R	6 ft 1 in (1.85 m)	205 lb (93 kg)	Jr	North Central Texas College	Fort Worth, TX
41	RHP	Jared Janczak	R/R	6 ft 1 in (1.85 m)	205 lb (93 kg)	RS So	Belton H.S.	Belton, TX
43	LHP	Dion Henderson	L/L	6 ft 4 in (1.93 m)	180 lb (82 kg)	Fr	Oak Park H.S.	Detroit, MI
44	RHP	Brian Howard	R/R	6 ft 9 in (2.06 m)	185 lb (84 kg)	Sr	St. Louis University H.S.	St. Louis, MO

Head coach

Jim Schlossnagle

Assistant coach(es)

Bill Mosiello
Kirk Saarloos
Zach Etheredge

Legend

- (C) Team captain
- (S) Suspended
- (I) Ineligible
- Injured
- Current redshirt

Roster
Last update: December 29, 2016

== Schedule and results ==
2017 TCU Horned Frogs baseball schedule and results
Regular season
February

Date	Time (CT)	TV	Opponent	Rank	Stadium	Score	Win	Loss	Save	Attendance	Overall	Big 12	
February 17	6:30 pm		Penn State*	#1	Lupton Stadium • Fort Worth, TX	**W** 6–3	**Janczak** (1–0)	Biasi (0–1)	**Feltman** (1)	5,812	1–0	–	Stats; Story
February 18	2:00 pm		Penn State*	#1	Lupton Stadium • Fort Worth, TX	**W** 12–1	**Howard** (1–0)	Lehman (0–1)	–	5,507	2–0	–	Stats; Story
February 19	11:00 am	FSSW+	Penn State*	#1	Lupton Stadium • Fort Worth, TX	**W** 9–3	**Lodolo** (1–0)	Hagenman (0–1)	–	4,455	3–0	–	Stats; Story
February 21	6:30 pm		at UT Arlington*	#1	Clay Gould Ballpark • Arlington, TX	**W** 7–2	**Eissler** (1–0)	West (0–1)	–	2,008	4–0	–	Stats; Story
February 24	6:30 pm		#19 Arizona State*	#1	Lupton Stadium • Fort Worth, TX	**L** 9–13	Lingos (2–0)	**Howard** (1–1)	–	5,062	4–1	–	Stats; Story
February 25	4:00 pm		#19 Arizona State*	#1	Lupton Stadium • Fort Worth, TX	**W** 8–4	**Lodolo** (2–0)	Hingst (0–1)	**Wymer** (1)	5,153	5–1	–	Stats; Story
February 26	1:00 pm	FSSW+	#19 Arizona State*	#1	Lupton Stadium • Fort Worth, TX	**W** 5–2	**Janczak** (2–0)	Montoya (0–1)	**Feltman** (2)	4,481	6–1	–	Stats; Story
February 28	6:30 pm		Rice*	#1	Lupton Stadium • Fort Worth, TX	**W** 13–5	**Eissler** (2–0)	Amador (0–2)	–	4,205	7–1	–	Stats; Story

March

Date	Time (CT)	TV	Opponent	Rank	Stadium	Score	Win	Loss	Save	Attendance	Overall	Big 12	
March 3	7:05 pm	FS2	#3 LSU*	#1	Minute Maid Park • Houston, TX (Shriners Hospitals for Children College Classic)	**W** 9–6	**Howard** (2–1)	Lange (2–1)	**King** (1)	17,145	8–1	–	Stats; Story
March 4	7:05 pm	FS2	#11 Texas A&M*	#1	Minute Maid Park • Houston, TX (Shriners Hospitals for Children College Classic)	**W** 11–10^{15}	**Feltman** (1–0)	Chafin (1–1)	–	21,843	9–1	–	Stats; Story
March 5	1:35 pm	FSN	#9 Ole Miss*	#1	Minute Maid Park • Houston, TX (Shriners Hospitals for Children College Classic)	**W** 5–3	**Janczak** (3–0)	Feigl (1–1)	**Feltman** (3)	6,497	10–1	–	Stats; Story
March 7	6:30 pm		#16 Dallas Baptist*	#1	Lupton Stadium • Fort Worth, TX	**W** 3–2^{10}	**Feltman** (2–0)	Elledge (0–1)	–	4,600	11–1	–	Stats; Story
March 10	8:30 pm		at UC Irvine*	#1	Anteater Ballpark • Irvine, CA	**L** 2–11	Raymond (3–1)	**Howard** (2–2)	–	1,148	11–2	–	Stats; Story
March 11	4:00 pm		at UC Irvine*	#1	Anteater Ballpark • Irvine, CA	**L** 3–6	Spear (2–0)	**Lodolo** (2–1)	Faucher (6)	1,168	11–3	–	Stats; Story
March 12	3:00 pm		at UC Irvine*	#1	Anteater Ballpark • Irvine, CA	**W** 16–7	**Janczak** (4–0)	Martin (1–1)	–	1,394	12–3	–	Stats; Story
March 14	8:00 pm		at Long Beach State*	#3	Blair Field • Long Beach, CA	**L** 0–7	Villalobos (1–0)	**Horton** (0–1)	–	1,732	12–4	–	Stats; Story
March 17	6:30 pm		Kansas	#3	Lupton Stadium • Fort Worth, TX	**W** 3–1	**Wymer** (1–0)	Leban (0–1)	**Feltman** (4)	4,521	13–4	1–0	Stats; Story
March 18	5:00 pm	FSSW	Kansas	#3	Lupton Stadium • Fort Worth, TX	**W** 5–1	**Janczak** (5–0)	Turski (1–2)	–	4,904	14–4	2–0	Stats; Story
March 19	1:00 pm	FSSW+	Kansas	#3	Lupton Stadium • Fort Worth, TX	**L** 3–4	Villines (1–2)	**Wymer** (1–1)	–	4,535	14–5	2–1	Stats; Story
March 21	6:30 pm		at Abilene Christian* *(Game completed May 2 in Fort Worth)	#3	Crutcher Scott Field • Abilene, TX	**W** 3–0	**Eissler** (3–0)*	Skeffington (1–4)*	**Feltman** (11)*	1,432	33–11*	–	Stats; Story
March 24	6:30 pm		Oklahoma State	#3	Lupton Stadium • Fort Worth, TX	**W** 7–5	**Green** (1–0)	Teel (2–2)	**Feltman** (5)	4,794	15–5	3–1	Stats; Story
March 25	7:00 pm	ESPN2	Oklahoma State	#3	Lupton Stadium • Fort Worth, TX	**W** 6–5	**Morris** (1–0)	Hearrean (0–1)	**Feltman** (6)	5,502	16–5	4–1	Stats; Story
March 26	1:00 pm	ESPN2	Oklahoma State	#3	Lupton Stadium • Fort Worth, TX	**W** 5–1	**Howard** (3–2)	Battenfield (2–1)	**Eissler** (1)	4,745	17–5	5–1	Stats; Story
March 28	6:30 pm		UTRGV*	#3	Lupton Stadium • Fort Worth, TX	**W** 10–2	**Eissler** (3–0)	Martinez (2–1)	–	3,760	18–5	–	Stats; Story
March 29	6:30 pm		UTRGV*	#3	Lupton Stadium • Fort Worth, TX	**W** 18–2^{7}	**Boyles** (1–0)	Delgado (2–2)	–	3,854	19–5	–	Stats; Story
March 31	6:35 pm	ESPN3	at Kansas State	#3	Tointon Family Stadium • Manhattan, KS	**W** 5–0^{11}	**Wymer** (2–1)	Floyd (1–3)	–	1,872	20–5	6–1	Stats; Story

April

Date	Time (CT)	TV	Opponent	Rank	Stadium	Score	Win	Loss	Save	Attendance	Overall	Big 12	
April 1	2:05 pm	ESPN3	at Kansas State	#3	Tointon Family Stadium • Manhattan, KS	**W** 1–0^{10}	**Green** (2–0)	Ward (0–2)	**Feltman** (7)	2,060	21–5	7–1	Stats; Story
April 2	1:05 pm	ESPN3	at Kansas State	#3	Tointon Family Stadium • Manhattan, KS	**W** 12–4	**Howard** (4–2)	Heinen (1–2)	–	1,836	22–5	8–1	Stats; Story
April 4	6:30 pm		at UT Arlington*	#3	Clay Gould Ballpark • Arlington, TX	**W** 5–4	**Traver** (1–0)	West (0–2)	**Feltman** (8)	1,187	23–5	–	Stats; Story
April 7	6:30 pm		Murray State*	#3	Lupton Stadium • Fort Worth, TX	**W** 9–2	**Janczak** (6–0)	Dills (2–1)	–	5,024	24–5	–	Stats; Story
April 8	2:00 pm	FSSW	Murray State*	#3	Lupton Stadium • Fort Worth, TX	**W** 15–6	**Lodolo** (3–1)	Dubsky (2–4)	–	4,780	25–5	–	Stats; Story
April 9	1:00 pm		Murray State*	#3	Lupton Stadium • Fort Worth, TX	**W** 13–2^{7}	**Howard** (5–2)	Hranec (2–2)	–	4,733	26–5	–	Stats; Story
April 11	6:30 pm		at Dallas Baptist*	#2	Horner Ballpark • Dallas, TX	**W** 9–3	**Traver** (2–0)	Johnson (0–2)	–	1,245	27–5	–	Stats; Story
April 14	5:30 pm		at West Virginia	#2	Monongalia County Ballpark • Granville, WV	**L** 4–5	Zarbnisky (4–0)	**Wymer** (2–2	–	2,914	27–6	8–2	Stats; Story
April 15	2:00 pm		at West Virginia	#2	Monongalia County Ballpark • Granville, WV	**W** 8–6	**Boyles** (2–0)	McDonald (1–2)	**Feltman** (9)	3,415	28–6	9–2	Stats; Story
April 16	11:00 am		at West Virginia	#2	Monongalia County Ballpark • Granville, WV	**L** 4–5	Sigman (1–2)	**Feltman** (2–1)	–	1,103	28–7	9–3	Stats; Story
April 21	6:30 pm	FCS	Baylor	#3	Lupton Stadium • Fort Worth, TX	**W** 9–4	**Lodolo** (4–1)	Lewis (4–4)	–	4,885	29–7	10–3	Stats; Story
April 22	3:00 pm	FSSW	Baylor	#3	Lupton Stadium • Fort Worth, TX	**L** 5–16	Parsons (3–2)	**Traver** (2–1)	–	5,287	29–8	10–4	Stats; Story
April 23	1:00 pm		Baylor	#3	Lupton Stadium • Fort Worth, TX	**W** 8–5	**Howard** (6–2)	Bradford (4–3)	**Brown** (1)	5,227	30–8	11–4	Stats; Story
April 25	6:30 pm	FSSW+	Stephen F. Austin*	#2	Lupton Stadium • Fort Worth, TX	**L** 2–6	Nouis (2–2)	**King** (0–1)	–	4,129	30–9	–	Stats; Story
April 28	6:30 pm	FS1	at #6 Texas Tech	#2	Dan Law Field at Rip Griffin Park • Lubbock, TX	**W** 4–1	**Lodolo** (5–1)	Lanning (2–1)	**Feltman** (10)	4,432	31–9	12–4	Stats; Story
April 29	3:00 pm	ESPNU	at #6 Texas Tech	#2	Dan Law Field at Rip Griffin Park • Lubbock, TX	**L** 4–6	Kilian (4–0)	**King** (0–2)	Mushinski (2)	4,432	31–10	12–5	Stats; Story
April 30	1:30 pm	ESPN	at #6 Texas Tech	#2	Dan Law Field at Rip Griffin Park • Lubbock, TX	**L** 3–21	Shetter (3–0)	**Howard** (6–3)	–	4,432	31–11	12–6	Stats; Story

May

Date	Time (CT)	TV	Opponent	Rank	Stadium	Score	Win	Loss	Save	Attendance	Overall	Big 12	
May 5	7:00 pm	ESPNU	Texas	#8	Lupton Stadium • Fort Worth, TX	**W** 11–10^{11}	**Coughlin** (1–0)	Ridgeway (1–2)	–	5,078	33–11	13–6	Stats; Story
May 6	12:00 pm	ESPN2	Texas	#8	Lupton Stadium • Fort Worth, TX	**W** 8–2	**Howard** (7–3)	Kingham (7–4)	–	5,324	34–11	14–6	Stats; Story
May 7	1:00 pm	ESPNU	Texas	#8	Lupton Stadium • Fort Worth, TX	**W** 4–3^{10}	**Wymer** (3–2)	Kennedy (7–1)	–	5,460	35–11	15–6	Stats; Story
May 12	6:30 pm		at Oklahoma	#4	L. Dale Mitchell Baseball Park • Norman, OK	**W** 9–6	**Wymer** (4–2)	Olson (3–1)	**Feltman** (12)	1,507	36–11	16–6	Stats; Story
May 13	2:00 pm	FSN	at Oklahoma	#4	L. Dale Mitchell Baseball Park • Norman, OK	**L** 8–9	Olsen (4–1)	**Feltman** (2–2)	–	1,607	36–12	16–7	Stats; Story
May 14	1:00 pm	FSN	at Oklahoma	#4	L. Dale Mitchell Baseball Park • Norman, OK	**L** 9–10	Olsen (5–1)	**Wymer** (4–3)	–	1,379	36–13	16–8	Stats; Story
May 16	6:30 pm	FSSW+	UT Arlington*	#6	Lupton Stadium • Fort Worth, TX	**W** 6–1	**Morris** (2–0)	Vassar (3–2)	–	4,376	37–13	16–8	Stats; Story
May 18	9:05 pm		at California*	#6	Evans Diamond • Berkeley, CA	**W** 3–0	**Janczak** (7–0)	Matulovich (4–3)	**Feltman** (13)	568	38–13	–	Stats; Story
May 19	8:05 pm	P12N	at California*	#6	Evans Diamond • Berkeley, CA	**W** 5–4	**Howard** (8–3)	Martinez (4–4)	**Feltman** (14)	885	39–13	–	Stats; Story
May 20	3:05 pm	P12N	at California*	#6	Evans Diamond • Berkeley, CA	**L** 3–8	Dodson (2–5)	**King** (0–3)	–	1,169	39–14	–	Stats; Story

Postseason
Big 12 Tournament

Date	Time (CT)	TV	Opponent	Rank/Seed	Stadium	Score	Win	Loss	Save	Attendance	Overall	Big 12 Tourn.	
May 24	4:00 pm	FSSW+	(7) Kansas	#7 (2)	Chickasaw Bricktown Ballpark • Oklahoma City, OK	**L** 3–7	Weiman (5–1)	**Wymer** (4–4)	–	4,034	39–15	0–1	Stats; Story
May 25	12:30 pm	FSSW+	(3) Oklahoma	#7 (2)	Chickasaw Bricktown Ballpark • Oklahoma City, OK	**W** 9–4	**Janczak** (8–0)	Irvin (6–2)	–	3,493	40–15	1–1	Stats; Story
May 26	7:00 pm	FSSW+	(7) Kansas	#7 (2)	Chickasaw Bricktown Ballpark • Oklahoma City, OK	**W** 6–0	**Howard** (9–3)	Rockoski (5–6)	–	5,424	41–15	2–1	Stats; Story
May 27	12:30 pm	FSSW+	(6) Texas	#7 (2)	Chickasaw Bricktown Ballpark • Oklahoma City, OK	**W** 9–2	**Traver** (3–1)	Johnston (3–2)	–	5,598	42–15	3–1	Stats; Story
May 27	6:00 pm	FSSW+	(6) Texas	#7 (2)	Chickasaw Bricktown Ballpark • Oklahoma City, OK	**L** 3–9	Henley (4–4)	**Green** (2–1)	–	3,469	42–16	3–2	Stats; Story

NCAA tournament Fort Worth Regional

Date	Time (CT)	TV	Opponent	Rank/Seed	Stadium	Score	Win	Loss	Save	Attendance	Overall	Regional	
June 3	9:45 pm	ESPN3	(4) Central Connecticut	#8 (1)	Lupton Stadium • Fort Worth, TX	**W** 9–6	**Traver** (4–1)	Smith (5–8)	**Feltman** (16)	4,151	43–16	1–0	Stats; Story
June 4	9:00 pm	ESPN3	#11 (2) Virginia	#8 (1)	Lupton Stadium • Fort Worth, TX	**W** 5–1	**Janczak** (9–0)	Lynch (7–5)	**Feltman** (17)	4,133	44–16	2–0	Stats; Story
June 5	7:20 pm	ESPN3	#20 (3) Dallas Baptist	#8 (1)	Lupton Stadium • Fort Worth, TX	**W** 15–3	**Howard** (10–3)	Fritz (0–1)	–	4,172	45–16	3–0	Stats; Story

NCAA tournament Fort Worth Super Regional

Date	Time (CT)	TV	Opponent	Rank	Stadium	Score	Win	Loss	Save	Attendance	Overall	Super	
June 10	5:00 pm	ESPNU	#8 Missouri State	#5	Lupton Stadium • Fort Worth, TX	**W** 3–2	**Wymer** (5–4)	Knutson (8–4)	**Feltman** (18)	5,181	46–16	1–0	Stats; Story
June 11	5:00 pm	ESPNU	#8 Missouri State	#5	Lupton Stadium • Fort Worth, TX	**W** 8–1	**Howard** (11–3)	Still (8–3)	–	5,277	47–16	2–0	Stats; Story

College World Series

Date	Time (CT)	TV	Opponent	Rank	Site/stadium	Score	Win	Loss	Save	Attendance	Overall	NCAA Tourn.		
June 18	6:00 pm	ESPN2	#3 Florida	#5	TD Ameritrade Park • Omaha, NE	**L** 0–3	Faedo (8–2)	**Janczak** (9–1)	–	23,543	47–17	5–1	0–1	Stats; Story
June 20	1:00 pm	ESPN	#8 Texas A&M	#5	TD Ameritrade Park • Omaha, NE	**W** 4–1	**Howard** (12–3)	Kolek (4–5)	**Wymer** (2)	17,940	48–17	6–1	1–1	Stats; Story
June 22	7:00 pm	ESPN2	#4 Louisville	#5	TD Ameritrade Park • Omaha, NE	**W** 4–3	**Wymer** (6–4)	Bennett (5–1)	–	24,985	49–17	7–1	2–1	Stats; Story
June 23	7:00 pm	ESPN	#3 Florida	#5	TD Ameritrade Park • Omaha, NE	**W** 9–2	**King** (1–3)	Kowar (12–1)	–	25,329	50–17	8–1	3–1	Stats; Story
June 24	7:00 pm	ESPN	#3 Florida	#5	TD Ameritrade Park • Omaha, NE	**L** 0–3	Faedo (9–2)	**Janczak** (9–2)	–	18,093	50–18	8–2	3–2	Stats; Story

Legend: = Win = Loss Bold = TCU team member
"#" represents ranking. All rankings from Collegiate Baseball on the date of the contest.
"()" represents postseason seeding in the Big 12 Tournament or NCAA Regional, respectively.

== Rankings ==
The Horned Frogs started 2017 as the unanimous preseason #1 club. On December 20, 2016, TCU was ranked preseason #1 by Collegiate Baseball. The Frogs' were also ranked preseason #1 by Perfect Game on January 11, 2017, D1 Baseball on January 17, 2017, Baseball America on January 23, 2017, the USA Today Coaches Poll on January 26, 2017, and the National Collegiate Baseball Writers Association on January 31, 2017.

Ranking movements Legend: ██ Increase in ranking ██ Decrease in ranking ( ) = First-place votes
	Week																		
Poll	Pre	1	2	3	4	5	6	7	8	9	10	11	12	13	14	15	16	17	Final
Coaches'	1 (24)	1 (24)*	1 (24)*	1 (30)	4 (7)	5	4	3	3	6	5	8	6	8	7	7	7*	7*	4
Baseball America	1	1	1	1	3	3	3	3	3	7	4	7	5	6	6	7	7*	7*	4
Collegiate Baseball^	1	1	1	1	3	3	3	3	2	3	2	8	4	6	7	8	5	5	4
NCBWA†	1	1	1	1	3	3	4	3	3	7	3	6	5	7	7	7	5	5^	4

^ Collegiate Baseball ranked 40 teams in their preseason poll, but only ranked 30 teams weekly during the season.
† NCBWA ranks 30 teams in their preseason poll, but only ranks 25 teams weekly during the season.
* A new poll was not released for this week, so for comparison purposes, the previous week's ranking is inserted in this week's slot.

== Awards and honors ==
=== Preseason All Americans ===
List of Preseason All-Americans
Player	Class	Position	Selected By	Team
Luken Baker	Sophomore	DH; DH; 1B; DH; DH	Collegiate Baseball Newspaper; Perfect Game; Baseball America; National Collegiate Baseball Writers Association; D1 Baseball	First Team; Second Team; Third Team; First Team; First Team
Elliot Barzilli	Senior	3B	Collegiate Baseball Newspaper; Perfect Game; National Collegiate Baseball Writers Association; D1 Baseball	Third Team; Second Team; Second Team; Third Team
Durbin Feltman	Sophomore	RP	Collegiate Baseball Newspaper; Perfect Game; National Collegiate Baseball Writers Association	Second Team; Second Team; Second Team
Brian Howard	Senior	SP	Collegiate Baseball Newspaper; Perfect Game; National Collegiate Baseball Writers Association	First Team; Second Team; Third Team
Evan Skoug	Junior	C	Collegiate Baseball Newspaper; Perfect Game; Baseball America; National Collegiate Baseball Writers Association; D1 Baseball	Second Team; Second Team; Second Team; Second Team; First Team

=== Preseason Big 12 awards ===
List of Preseason Big 12 Awards
Player	Class	Position	Selected By	Award
Luken Baker	Sophomore	DH/1B	Baseball America; Perfect Game; D1 Baseball	Player of the Year; Player of the Year; Player of the Year
Nick Lodolo	Freshman	LHP	Baseball America; Perfect Game; D1 Baseball	Freshman of the Year; Freshman of the Year; Freshman of the Year

=== Weekly awards ===
List of Weekly Awards
Player	Class	Position	Date	Selected By	Award
Luken Baker	Sophomore	DH/1B	March 6	Big 12	Player of the Week
Jared Janczak	Sophomore	RHP	March 20; April 3	Big 12; Big 12	Pitcher of the Week; Pitcher of the Week
Nick Lodolo	Freshman	LHP	April 3	Big 12	Newcomer of the Week
Austen Wade	Junior	OF	March 27	Big 12	Player of the Week
Evan Skoug	Junior	C	May 8	Big 12	Co-Player of the Week
Brian Howard	Senior	RHP	May 8	Big 12	Pitcher of the Week

== See also ==
- 2017 Big 12 Conference baseball tournament
- 2017 NCAA Division I baseball season
