= 2017 Texas Tech Red Raiders baseball team =

American college baseball season

2017 Texas Tech Red Raiders baseball

Big 12 Conference co-champion
- Conference: Big 12 Conference

Ranking
- Coaches: No. 15
- CB: No. 12
- Record: 42-13 (16-8 Big 12)
- Head coach: Tim Tadlock (5th season)
- Assistant coaches: Ray Hayward (5th season); J-Bob Thomas (5th season); Matt Gardner (5th season)
- Home stadium: Dan Law Field at Rip Griffin Park

2017 Big 12 Conference baseball standings
	Conf.				Overall
Team	W		L	PCT	W		L	PCT
No. 19 Texas Tech ‍†‍‍^{y}	16	–	8	.667	45	–	17	.726
No. 4 TCU ‍‍‍^{y}	16	–	8	.667	50	–	18	.735
Oklahoma ‍‍‍^{y}	12	–	11	.522	35	–	24	.593
Baylor ‍‍‍^{y}	12	–	12	.500	34	–	23	.596
West Virginia ‍‍‍^{y}	12	–	12	.500	36	–	26	.581
No. 28 Texas ‍‍‍^{y}	11	–	12	.478	39	–	24	.619
Kansas ‍‍‍	11	–	13	.458	30	–	28	.517
Oklahoma State ‍‍‡‍^{y}	8	–	14	.364	30	–	27	.526
Kansas State ‍‍‍	8	–	16	.333	29	–	26	.527
† – Conference champion ‡ – Conference Tournament champion y – Invited to the NCAA tournament Rankings from Collegiate Baseball

The 2017 Texas Tech Red Raiders baseball team represented Texas Tech University during the 2017 NCAA Division I baseball season. The Red Raiders played their home games at Dan Law Field at Rip Griffin Park as a member of the Big 12 Conference. They were led by head coach Tim Tadlock, in his 5th season at Texas Tech.

== Schedule and results ==
2017 Texas Tech Red Raiders baseball game log
Regular season

February
Date	Opponent	Site/stadium	Score	Win	Loss	Save	TV	Attendance	Overall record	Big 12 Record

March
Date	Opponent	Site/stadium	Score	Win	Loss	Save	TV	Attendance	Overall record	Big 12 Record

April
Date	Opponent	Site/stadium	Score	Win	Loss	Save	TV	Attendance	Overall record	Big 12 Record

May
Date	Opponent	Site/stadium	Score	Win	Loss	Save	TV	Attendance	Overall record	Big 12 Record

Postseason

Big 12 Tournament
Date	Opponent	Rank	Site/stadium	Score	Win	Loss	Save	Attendance	Overall record	B12T Record
May 23	Oklahoma State		Chickasaw Bricktown Ballpark • Oklahoma City, OK							
May 24	TBD		Chickasaw Bricktown Ballpark • Oklahoma City, OK							
May 26	TBD		Chickasaw Bricktown Ballpark • Oklahoma City, OK							

Legend: = Win = Loss = Postponement
Bold = Texas Tech team member

== Rankings ==
Ranking movements Legend: ██ Increase in ranking ██ Decrease in ranking
	Week																		
Poll	Pre	1	2	3	4	5	6	7	8	9	10	11	12	13	14	15	16	17	Final
Coaches'	19	19*	19*	9	6	3													
Baseball America	25	21	21	14	11	8													
Collegiate Baseball^	29	20	12	12	4	4													
NCBWA†	17	18	11	9	8	4													

^ Collegiate Baseball ranked 40 teams in their preseason poll, but only ranked 30 teams weekly during the season.
† NCBWA ranks 30 teams in their preseason poll, but only ranks 25 teams weekly during the season.
* A new poll was not released for this week, so for comparison purposes, the previous week's ranking is inserted in this week's slot.
