= 2017 Big 12 Conference baseball tournament =

American college baseball tournament

- Teams: 8
- Format: Double-elimination tournament
- Finals site: Chickasaw Bricktown Ballpark; Oklahoma City, OK
- Champions: Oklahoma State (2nd title)
- Winning coach: Josh Holliday (1st title)
- MVP: Garrett McCain (Oklahoma State)
- Television: Bracket Play: FCS Central; Championship: FSN

2017 Big 12 Conference baseball standings
	Conf.				Overall
Team	W		L	PCT	W		L	PCT
No. 19 Texas Tech ‍†‍‍^{y}	16	–	8	.667	45	–	17	.726
No. 4 TCU ‍‍‍^{y}	16	–	8	.667	50	–	18	.735
Oklahoma ‍‍‍^{y}	12	–	11	.522	35	–	24	.593
Baylor ‍‍‍^{y}	12	–	12	.500	34	–	23	.596
West Virginia ‍‍‍^{y}	12	–	12	.500	36	–	26	.581
No. 28 Texas ‍‍‍^{y}	11	–	12	.478	39	–	24	.619
Kansas ‍‍‍	11	–	13	.458	30	–	28	.517
Oklahoma State ‍‍‡‍^{y}	8	–	14	.364	30	–	27	.526
Kansas State ‍‍‍	8	–	16	.333	29	–	26	.527
† – Conference champion ‡ – Conference Tournament champion y – Invited to the NCAA tournament Rankings from Collegiate Baseball

The 2017 Big 12 Conference baseball tournament was held from May 24 through 28 at Chickasaw Bricktown Ballpark in Oklahoma City, Oklahoma. The annual tournament determines the conference champion of the Division I Big 12 Conference for college baseball. The winner of the tournament earned the league's automatic bid to the 2017 NCAA Division I baseball tournament.

The tournament has been held since 1997, the inaugural year of the Big 12 Conference. Among current league members, Texas has won the most championships with five. Among original members, Baylor and Kansas State have never won the event. Iowa State discontinued its program after the 2001 season without having won a title. Having joined in 2013, TCU won their first title in 2014 while West Virginia has yet to win the Tournament.

== Format and seeding ==
The top eight finishers from the regular season will be seeded one through eight, and will then play a two-bracket double-elimination tournament leading to a winner-take-all championship game.

Place	Seed	Team	Conference				Overall		
Place	Seed	Team	W	L	%	GB	W	L	%
1	1	Texas Tech	16	8	.667	–	45	17	.726
1	2	TCU	16	8	.667	–	50	18	.735
3	3	Oklahoma	12	11	.522	3.5	35	24	.593
4	4	West Virginia	12	12	.500	4	36	26	.581
4	5	Baylor	12	12	.500	4	34	23	.596
6	6	Texas	11	12	.478	4.5	39	24	.619
7	7	Kansas	11	13	.458	5	30	28	.517
8	8	Oklahoma State	8	14	.364	7	30	27	.526
9	–	Kansas State	8	16	.333	8	29	26	.527

== Results ==
First round
1	Texas Tech	0
8	Oklahoma State	3
4	West Virginia	11^{8}
5	Baylor	1
1	Texas Tech	4
5	Baylor	1
3	Oklahoma	4
6	Texas	8
2	TCU	3
7	Kansas	7
3	Oklahoma	4
2	TCU	9

Second round
8	Oklahoma State	8
4	West Virginia	4
4	West Virginia	12^{10}
1	Texas Tech	7
6	Texas	5
7	Kansas	4
7	Kansas	0
2	TCU	6

Semifinals
8	Oklahoma State	4^{10}	—
4	West Virginia	3	—
6	Texas	2	9
2	TCU	9	3

Final
8	Oklahoma State	6
6	Texas	5

== All-Tournament Team ==
Position	Player	School
C	Colin Simpson	Oklahoma State
1B	Jackson Cramer	West Virginia
1B	Kacy Clemens	Texas
2B	Ryan Cash	Oklahoma State
SS	David Hamilton	Texas
3B	Elliott Barzilli	TCU
OF	Garrett McCain	Oklahoma State
OF	Darius Hill	West Virginia
OF	Ryan Sluder	Oklahoma State
DH	Braden Zarbinsky	West Virginia
DH	Bryce Fischer	Oklahoma State
SP	Blake Battenfield	Oklahoma State
SP	Isaiah Kearns	West Virginia
SP	Brian Howard	TCU
RP	Carson Teel	Oklahoma State
MOP	Garrett McCain	Oklahoma State
