= 2017 Southland Conference baseball tournament =

- Teams: 8
- Format: Double-elimination
- Finals site: Constellation Field; Sugar Land, Texas
- Champions: Sam Houston State (6th title)
- Winning coach: Matt Deggs (2nd title)
- MVP: Robie Rojas (Sam Houston State)

2017 Southland Conference baseball standings
	Conf.						Overall
Team	W		L		T	PCT	W		L		T	PCT
McNeese State ‍†‍‍	22	–	8	–	0	.733	37	–	20	–	0	.649
Southeastern Louisiana ‍‍‍^{y}	20	–	10	–	0	.667	37	–	22	–	0	.627
No. 14 Sam Houston State ‍‍‡‍^{y}	19	–	11	–	0	.633	44	–	23	–	0	.657
Houston Baptist ‍‍‍	18	–	12	–	0	.600	29	–	25	–	0	.537
Central Arkansas ‍‍‍	17	–	13	–	0	.567	34	–	26	–	0	.567
Stephen F. Austin ‍‍‍	17	–	13	–	0	.567	29	–	28	–	0	.509
Lamar ‍‍‍	16	–	14	–	0	.533	33	–	25	–	0	.569
New Orleans ‍‍‍	16	–	14	–	0	.533	30	–	28	–	1	.517
Nicholls State ‍‍‍	15	–	15	–	0	.500	29	–	27	–	0	.518
Texas A&M–Corpus Christi ‍‍‍	14	–	16	–	0	.467	22	–	32	–	0	.407
Northwestern State ‍‍‍	10	–	20	–	0	.333	20	–	34	–	0	.370
Incarnate Word * ‍‍‍	8	–	22	–	0	.267	20	–	36	–	0	.357
Abilene Christian * ‍‍‍	3	–	27	–	0	.100	13	–	43	–	0	.232
† – Conference champion ‡ – Tournament champion y – Invited to the NCAA tournament: * Ineligible for league and NCAA tournaments due to transition from Division II Rankings from Collegiate Baseball

The 2017 Southland Conference baseball tournament was held from May 24 through 27. The top eight regular season finishers of the league's thirteen teams met in the double-elimination tournament to be held at Constellation Field in Sugar Land, Texas. Sam Houston State won their sixth tournament championship to earn the conference's automatic bid to the 2017 NCAA Division I baseball tournament. Abilene Christian and Incarnate Word are ineligible for postseason play as they transition from Division II.

== Seeding and format ==
The top eight finishers from the regular season, not including Abilene Christian or Incarnate Word, were seeded one through eight. They played a two bracket, double-elimination tournament, with the winner of each bracket meeting in a single championship final.

Team	W	L	Pct	GB	Seed
McNeese State	22	8	.733	—	1
Southeastern Louisiana	20	10	.667	2	2
Sam Houston State	19	11	.633	3	3
Houston Baptist	18	12	.600	4	4
Central Arkansas	17	13	.567	5	5
Stephen F. Austin	17	13	.567	5	6
New Orleans	16	14	.533	6	7
Lamar	16	14	.533	6	8
Nicholls State	15	15	.500	7	–
Texas A&M-Corpus Christi	14	16	.467	8	—
Northwestern State	10	20	.333	12	–
Incarnate Word	8	22	.267	14	—
Abilene Christian	3	27	.100	19	—

== Results ==
First round
1	McNeese State	7
8	Lamar	5
4	Houston Baptist	4
5	Central Arkansas	15^{7}
8	Lamar	5
4	Houston Baptist	8
3	Sam Houston State	13^{7}
6	Stephen F. Austin	1
2	Southeastern Louisiana	12
7	New Orleans	7
6	Stephen F. Austin	3
7	New Orleans	4^{10}

Second round
1	McNeese State	3
5	Central Arkansas	5
4	Houston Baptist	5
1	McNeese State	4
3	Sam Houston State	8
2	Southeastern Louisiana	4
2	Southeastern Louisiana	4
7	New Orleans	7

Semifinals
5	Central Arkansas	2	3
4	Houston Baptist	6	0
3	Sam Houston State	7	—
7	New Orleans	1	—

Final
5	Central Arkansas	4
3	Sam Houston State	9

== All-Tournament Team ==
The following players were named to the All-Tournament Team.

Name	School
Pitchers
Heath Donica	Sam Houston State
Brandon Hagerla	Central Arkansas
Zach Carter	Houston Baptist
Position Players
Robie Rojas	Sam Houston State
Blake Chisolm	Sam Houston State
Brooks Balisterri	Central Arkansas
Hunter Hearn	Sam Houston State
Hezekiah Randolph	New Orleans
Keaton Presley	Central Arkansas
Spencer Halloran	Houston Baptist
Eddie Sanchez	Central Arkansas
Christian Thames	Houston Baptist

=== Most Valuable Player ===
Robie Rojas was named Tournament Most valuable Player. Rojas was a catcher for Sam Houston State.
