= 2017 Texas Longhorns baseball team =

American college baseball season

2017 Texas Longhorns baseball

Big 12 tournament, runners-up

Long Beach Regional, runners-up
- Conference: Big 12 Conference

Ranking
- Coaches: No. 25
- CB: No. 28
- Record: 39–24 (11–12 Big 12)
- Head coach: David Pierce (1st season)
- Assistant coaches: Sean Allen (1st season); Philip Miller (1st season)
- Home stadium: UFCU Disch–Falk Field

2017 Big 12 Conference baseball standings
	Conf.				Overall
Team	W		L	PCT	W		L	PCT
No. 19 Texas Tech ‍†‍‍^{y}	16	–	8	.667	45	–	17	.726
No. 4 TCU ‍‍‍^{y}	16	–	8	.667	50	–	18	.735
Oklahoma ‍‍‍^{y}	12	–	11	.522	35	–	24	.593
Baylor ‍‍‍^{y}	12	–	12	.500	34	–	23	.596
West Virginia ‍‍‍^{y}	12	–	12	.500	36	–	26	.581
No. 28 Texas ‍‍‍^{y}	11	–	12	.478	39	–	24	.619
Kansas ‍‍‍	11	–	13	.458	30	–	28	.517
Oklahoma State ‍‍‡‍^{y}	8	–	14	.364	30	–	27	.526
Kansas State ‍‍‍	8	–	16	.333	29	–	26	.527
† – Conference champion ‡ – Conference Tournament champion y – Invited to the NCAA tournament Rankings from Collegiate Baseball

The 2017 Texas Longhorns baseball team represented the University of Texas at Austin during the 2017 NCAA Division I baseball season. The Longhorns played their home games at UFCU Disch–Falk Field as a member of the Big 12 Conference. They were led by head coach David Pierce, in his first season at Texas.

The Longhorns finished as the runner-up for the 2017 Big 12 Conference baseball tournament, then finished as runner-up to Long Beach State in the Long Beach Regional.

== Personnel ==
=== Roster ===
2017 Texas Longhorns roster
Pitchers: 13 - Tyler Schimpf (RHP) - (redshirt) Sophomore; 14 - Beau Ridgeway (RHP) - Sophomore; 19 - Connor Mayes (RHP) - Junior; 24 - Chase Shugart (RHP) - Sophomore; 27 - Blair Henley (RHP) - Freshman; 28 - Beau O'Hara (RHP) - Sophomore; 29 - Jon Malmin (LHP) - Senior; 31 - Kevin Roliard (RHP) - Freshman; 32 - Nick Kennedy (LHP) - Sophomore; 34 - Kyle Johnston (RHP) - Junior; 35 - Blake Wellmann (RHP) - Sophomore; 41 - Morgan Cooper (RHP) - (redshirt) Junior; 45 - Nolan Kingham (RHP) - Sophomore; 49 - Parker Joe Robinson (RHP) - (redshirt) Sophomore; 42 - Kacy Clemens (RHP) - Senior; 51 - Jake McKenzie (RHP) - Junior; 52 - Zach Zubia (RHP) - Freshman	Catchers: 7 - Michael Cantu - Junior; 40 - Michael McCann - (redshirt) Sophomore; 47 - George Pappas - (redshirt) Sophomore; Infielders: 1 - David Hamilton - Freshman; 2 - Kody Clemens - Sophomore; 5 - Austin McNicholas - Freshman; 8 - Andres Sosa - Freshman; 10 - Joe Baker - Junior; 11 - Travis Jones - Junior; 17 - Bret Boswell - (redshirt) Junior; 37 - Ryan Reynolds - Freshman; 42 - Kacy Clemens - Senior; 51 - Jake McKenzie - Junior; 52 - Zach Zubia - Freshman	Outfielders: 4 - Tate Shaw - (redshirt) Sophomore; 6 - Tyler Rand - Sophomore; 11 - Travis Jones - Junior; 33 - Patrick Mathis - Junior; 44 - Austin Todd - Freshman; 48 - Trace Bucey - Freshman; 50 - Zane Gurwitz - Senior

=== Coaches ===
2017 Texas Longhorns coaching staff
- David Pierce - Head Coach - 1st year
- Sean Allen - Assistant Coach - 1st year
- Phillip Miller - Assistant Coach - 1st year
- Phil Haig - Volunteer Coach - 1st year

== Schedule and results ==
2017 Texas Longhorns baseball game log
Regular season

February
Date	Opponent	Rank	Site/stadium	Score	Win	Loss	Save	Attendance	Overall record	Big 12 Record
Feb 17	#27 Rice*	#30	UFCU Disch–Falk Field • Austin, TX	L 2–3	Kravetz(1–0)	Kingham(0–1)		6,197	0–1	
Feb 18	#27 Rice*	#30	UFCU Disch–Falk Field • Austin, TX	W 5–4	Johnston(1–0)	Salinas(0–1)	O'Hara (1)		1–1	
Feb 18	#27 Rice*	#30	UFCU Disch–Falk Field • Austin, TX	W 6–1	Henley(1–0)	Canterino(0–1)		7,160	2–1	
Feb 19	#27 Rice*	#30	UFCU Disch–Falk Field • Austin, TX	L 1–7	Esquivel(1–0)	Mayes(0–1)		4,658	2–2	
Feb 22	at #18 Sam Houston State*	#25	Don Sanders Stadium • Huntsville, TX	W 7–2	Kingham(1–1)	Mills(0–1)		2,815	3–2	
Feb 24	UConn*	#25	UFCU Disch–Falk Field • Austin, TX	W 4–1	Cooper(1–0)	Cate(1–1)	Shugart (1)	4,370	4–2	
Feb 25	UConn*	#25	UFCU Disch–Falk Field • Austin, TX	L 1–2	Montgomerie(2–0)	Johnston(1–1)	Russell (2)	5,187	4–3	
Feb 26	UConn*	#25	UFCU Disch–Falk Field • Austin, TX	W 9–3	McKenzie(1–0)	Domnarski(0–2)		4,292	5–3	
Feb 28	Lamar*	#24	UFCU Disch–Falk Field • Austin, TX	W 9–5	Kennedy(1–0)	Erickson(0–1)	Ridgeway (1)	4,109	6–3	

March
Date	Opponent	Rank	Site/stadium	Score	Win	Loss	Save	Attendance	Overall record	Big 12 Record
Mar 2	at #17 Stanford*	#24	Klein Field at Sunken Diamond • Stanford, CA	W 4–0	Kingham(2–1)	Bubic(1–2)	Ridgeway (2)	992	7–3	
Mar 3	at #17 Stanford*	#24	Klein Field at Sunken Diamond • Stanford, CA	L 2–3	Hock(2–0)	McKenzie(1–1)		1,167	7–4	
Mar 4	at #17 Stanford*	#24	Klein Field at Sunken Diamond • Stanford, CA	L 1–2	Hock(3–0)	Shugart(0–1)		1,429	7–5	
Mar 4	at #17 Stanford*	#24	Klein Field at Sunken Diamond • Stanford, CA	L 2–5	Castellanos(2–0)	Henley(1–1)	Hock (3)	1,429	7–6	
Mar 7	Richmond*		UFCU Disch–Falk Field • Austin, TX	W 9–0	Mayes(1–1)	Miller(1–1)		3,926	8–6	
Mar 8	Texas A&M-Corpus Christi*		UFCU Disch–Falk Field • Austin, TX	W 15–0	Kennedy(2–0)	Carter(0–3)		3,954	9–6	
Mar 10	UCLA*		UFCU Disch–Falk Field • Austin, TX	W 5–4	Ridgeway(1–0)	Gadsby(2–4)	Johnston (1)	4,391	10–6	
Mar 11	UCLA*		UFCU Disch–Falk Field • Austin, TX	W 5–2	Cooper(2–0)	Scheidler(1–1)	Johnston (2)	4,549	11–6	
Mar 12	UCLA*		UFCU Disch–Falk Field • Austin, TX	W 10–5	Henley(2–1)	Olsen(0–1)	McKenzie (1)	4,869	12–6	
Mar 14	#11 Texas A&M*	#27	UFCU Disch–Falk Field • Austin, TX	W 4–3	Kennedy(3–0)	Doxakis(0–1)	Shugart (2)	6,985	13–6	
Mar 17	#4 Texas Tech	#27	UFCU Disch–Falk Field • Austin, TX	L 1–2	Martin(3–1)	Kingham(2–2)	McMillon (3)	6,396	13–7	0–1
Mar 18	#4 Texas Tech	#27	UFCU Disch–Falk Field • Austin, TX	L 1–2	Gingery(4–0)	Cooper(2–1)	Quezada (2)	7,091	13–8	0–2
Mar 19	#4 Texas Tech	#27	UFCU Disch–Falk Field • Austin, TX	L 5–8	Mushinski(1–1)	Henley(2–2)	Dusek (1)	5,763	13–9	0–3
Mar 21	at Texas State*		Bobcat Ballpark • San Marcos, TX	L 10–11	Walden(5–0)	Robinson(0–1)		3,017	13–10	
Mar 22	UT Rio Grande Valley*		UFCU Disch–Falk Field • Austin, TX	W 9–7	Malmin(1–0)	Becerra(1–1)	Ridgeway (3)	3,968	14–10	
Mar 24	Kansas State		UFCU Disch–Falk Field • Austin, TX	W 2–0	Kingham(3–2)	Heskett(2–2)		4,208	15–10	1–3
Mar 25	Kansas State		UFCU Disch–Falk Field • Austin, TX	W 5–0	Cooper(3–1)	Rigler(2–2)		5,210	16–10	2–3
Mar 26	Kansas State		UFCU Disch–Falk Field • Austin, TX	W 6–5	Shugart(1–1)	Floyd(1–2)	Ridgeway (4)	4,689	17–10	3–3
Mar 28	vs Texas A&M-Corpus Christi*		Whataburger Field • Corpus Christi, TX	W 12–2	Kennedy(4–0)	Holland(0–2)		4,754	18–10	
Mar 31	at Kansas		Hoglund Ballpark • Lawrence, KS	W 5–3	Kingham(4–2)	Rackoski(3–3)	Ridgeway (5)	1,044	19–10	4–3

April
Date	Opponent	Rank	Site/stadium	Score	Win	Loss	Save	Attendance	Overall record	Big 12 Record
Apr 1	at Kansas		Hoglund Ballpark • Lawrence, KS	L 1–2	Turski(2–2)	Cooper(3–2)	Villines (5)	1,248	19–11	4–4
Apr 2	at Kansas		Hoglund Ballpark • Lawrence, KS	L 4–5	Leban(1–1)	Henley(2–3)	Villines (6)	1,046	19–12	4–5
Apr 4	Sam Houston State*		UFCU Disch–Falk Field • Austin, TX	W 8–1	Johnston(2–1)	Mills(3–2)		4,235	20–12	
Apr 7	#12 Oklahoma		UFCU Disch–Falk Field • Austin, TX	W 5–3	Kingham(5–2)	Grove(1–2)	Ridgeway (6)	5,832	21–12	5–5
Apr 8	#12 Oklahoma		UFCU Disch–Falk Field • Austin, TX	W 9–3	Cooper(4–2)	Madden(4–1)		6,603	22–12	6–5
Apr 9	#12 Oklahoma		UFCU Disch–Falk Field • Austin, TX	L 1–2	Berry(1–0)	Shugart(1–2)		5,580	22–13	6–6
Apr 11	Texas State*		UFCU Disch–Falk Field • Austin, TX	W 9–2	Shugart(2–2)	Baird(1–3)		4,474	23–13	
Apr 13	at Baylor		Baylor Ballpark • Waco, TX	L 2–6	Lewis(4–3)	Kingham(5–3)		2,387	23–14	6–7
Apr 14	at Baylor		Baylor Ballpark • Waco, TX	L 3–4	Montemayor(2–1)	Ridgeway(1–1)		3,860	23–15	6–8
Apr 15	at Baylor		Baylor Ballpark • Waco, TX	W 5–3	Kennedy(5–0)	Ott(1–1)	Ridgeway (7)	3,214	24–15	7–8
Apr 18	Texas State*		UFCU Disch–Falk Field • Austin, TX	W 2–0	Henley(3–3)	Baird(1–4)	Ridgeway (8)	4,744	25–15	
Apr 21	New Orleans*		UFCU Disch–Falk Field • Austin, TX	W 7–1	Kennedy(6–0)	Semple(5–3)		4,446	26–15	
Apr 22	New Orleans*		UFCU Disch–Falk Field • Austin, TX	W 3–2	Cooper(5–3)	Warzek(5–2)	Ridgeway (9)	4,917	27–15	
Apr 23	New Orleans*		UFCU Disch–Falk Field • Austin, TX	W 4–3	Kingham(5–3)	Hodge(0–2)		4,631	28–15	
Apr 25	vs Louisiana*		Constellation Field • Sugar Land, TX	L 1–8	Guillory(3–2)	Henley(3–4)		4,200	28–16	
Apr 28	at Oklahoma State		Allie P. Reynolds Stadium • Stillwater, OK	W 5–4	Kingham(7–3)	Hearrean(0–4)	Ridgeway (10)		29–16	8–8
Apr 28	at Oklahoma State		Allie P. Reynolds Stadium • Stillwater, OK	W 7–0	Cooper(6–2)	Buffett(5–4)		1,937	30–16	9–8
Apr 30	at Oklahoma State		Allie P. Reynolds Stadium • Stillwater, OK							

May
Date	Opponent	Rank	Site/stadium	Score	Win	Loss	Save	Attendance	Overall record	Big 12 Record
May 2	#23 UT Arlington*		UFCU Disch–Falk Field • Austin, TX	W 4–1	Kennedy(7–0)	Michalski(0–2)	Ridgeway (11)	4,414	31–16	
May 5	at #8 TCU		Lupton Stadium • Fort Worth, TX	L 10–11	Coughlin(1–0)	Ridgeway(1–2)		5,078	31–17	9–9
May 6	at #8 TCU		Lupton Stadium • Fort Worth, TX	L 2–8	Howard(7–3)	Kingham(7–4)		5,324	31–18	9–10
May 7	at #8 TCU		Lupton Stadium • Fort Worth, TX	L 3–4	Wymer(3–2)	Kennedy(7–1)		5,460	31–19	9–11
May 16	Incarnate Word*		UFCU Disch–Falk Field • Austin, TX	W 10–3	Kennedy(8–1)	Miller(1–4)		4,269	32–19	
May 19	West Virginia		UFCU Disch–Falk Field • Austin, TX	W 6–2	Kingham(8–4)	Myers(4–3)		5,231	33–19	10–11
May 20	West Virginia		UFCU Disch–Falk Field • Austin, TX	L 3–4	Sigman(5–4)	Cooper(6–3)	Zarbnisky (6)	5,209	33–20	10–12
May 21	West Virginia		UFCU Disch–Falk Field • Austin, TX	W 9–4	Johnston(3–1)	Strowd(1–3)		5,256	34–20	11–12

Postseason

Big 12 Tournament
Date	Opponent	Rank	Site/stadium	Score	Win	Loss	Save	Attendance	Overall record	Tournament record
May 24	vs Oklahoma		Chickasaw Bricktown Ballpark • Oklahoma City, OK	W 8–4	Shugart(3–2)	Wiles(4–4)		4,720	35–20	1–0
May 25	vs Kansas		Chickasaw Bricktown Ballpark • Oklahoma City, OK	W 5–4	Kingham(9–4)	Goddard(5–4)		4,492	36–20	2–0
May 27	vs #7 TCU		Chickasaw Bricktown Ballpark • Oklahoma City, OK	L 2–9	Traver(3–1)	Johnston(3–2)		5,598	36–21	2–1
May 27	vs #7 TCU		Chickasaw Bricktown Ballpark • Oklahoma City, OK	W 9–3	Henley(4–4)	Green(2–1)	Shugart (3)	3,469	37–21	3–1
May 28	vs Oklahoma State		Chickasaw Bricktown Ballpark • Oklahoma City, OK	L 5–6	Battenfield(5–4)	Mayes(1–2)	Teel (3)	8,923	37–22	3–2

NCAA Long Beach Regional
Date	Opponent	Rank	Site/stadium	Score	Win	Loss	Save	Attendance	Overall record	Regional Record
Jun 2	vs #30 UCLA		Blair Field • Long Beach, CA	W 3–2	Kingham(10–4)	Canning(7–4)	Ridgeway (12)	2,283	38–22	1–0
Jun 3	vs #6 Long Beach State		Blair Field • Long Beach, CA	W 5–3	Ridgeway(2–2)	Rivera(1–2)		2,867	39–22	2–0
Jun 4	vs #6 Long Beach State		Blair Field • Long Beach, CA	L 3–4	Baayoun(3–0)	Henley(4–5)	Advocate (5)	2,252	39–23	2–1
Jun 5	vs #6 Long Beach State		Blair Field • Long Beach, CA	L 1–2	Baayoun(4–0)	Kennedy(8–2)	Rivera (12)	2,830	39–24	2–2

All rankings from Collegiate Baseball.

== Rankings ==
Ranking movements Legend: ██ Increase in ranking ██ Decrease in ranking — = Not ranked
	Week																		
Poll	Pre	1	2	3	4	5	6	7	8	9	10	11	12	13	14	15	16	17	Final
Coaches'		*														25	25*	25*	25
Baseball America																			24
Collegiate Baseball^	30	25	24	—	27	—											28	28*	28
NCBWA†			27	—								26	30	—		25	20	20*	23

^ Collegiate Baseball ranked 40 teams in their preseason poll, but only ranked 30 teams weekly during the season.
† NCBWA ranks 30 teams in their preseason poll, but only ranks 25 teams weekly during the season.
* A new poll was not released for this week, so for comparison purposes, the previous week's ranking is inserted in this week's slot.
