= 2017 West Virginia Mountaineers baseball team =

American college baseball season

2017 West Virginia Mountaineers baseball

NCAA Winston-Salem Regional, 2-2
- Conference: Big 12 Conference
- Record: 36-26 (12–12 Big 12)
- Head coach: Randy Mazey (5th season)
- Assistant coaches: Derek Matlock (5th season); Steve Sabins (2nd season)
- Home stadium: Monongalia County Ballpark

2017 Big 12 Conference baseball standings
	Conf.				Overall
Team	W		L	PCT	W		L	PCT
No. 19 Texas Tech ‍†‍‍^{y}	16	–	8	.667	45	–	17	.726
No. 4 TCU ‍‍‍^{y}	16	–	8	.667	50	–	18	.735
Oklahoma ‍‍‍^{y}	12	–	11	.522	35	–	24	.593
Baylor ‍‍‍^{y}	12	–	12	.500	34	–	23	.596
West Virginia ‍‍‍^{y}	12	–	12	.500	36	–	26	.581
No. 28 Texas ‍‍‍^{y}	11	–	12	.478	39	–	24	.619
Kansas ‍‍‍	11	–	13	.458	30	–	28	.517
Oklahoma State ‍‍‡‍^{y}	8	–	14	.364	30	–	27	.526
Kansas State ‍‍‍	8	–	16	.333	29	–	26	.527
† – Conference champion ‡ – Conference Tournament champion y – Invited to the NCAA tournament Rankings from Collegiate Baseball

The 2017 West Virginia Mountaineers baseball team represented West Virginia University during the 2017 NCAA Division I baseball season. The Mountaineers played their home games at Monongalia County Ballpark as a member of the Big 12 Conference. They were led by head coach Randy Mazey, in his 5th season at West Virginia. They reached the Winston-Salem Regional final in the NCAA tournament, where they lost to Wake Forest.

== Previous season ==
West Virginia finished the 2016 season with an overall record of 36–22 and a 12–11 record in Big 12 play, placing fifth in the conference standings. The team surged late in the year and made a deep run in the Big 12 Baseball Championship, defeating Oklahoma twice and Texas Tech to reach the tournament final, where they fell to TCU.

== Personnel ==
=== Coaching staff ===
2017 West Virginia Mountaineers coaching staff
- Randy Mazey - Head coach - 5th year
- Derek Matlock - Assistant Coach - 5th year
- Steve Sabins - Assistant Coach - 2nd year

=== Roster ===
2017 West Virginia Mountaineers baseball team
Players
Coaches

#	Pos.	Name	B/T	Height	Weight	Year	Home town
2	RHP	Michael Grove	R/R	6 ft 3 in (1.91 m)	200 lb (91 kg)	So	Wheeling, West Virginia
3	INF	Jimmy Galusky	R/R	6 ft 3 in (1.91 m)	185 lb (84 kg)	So	Arthurdale, West Virginia
4	RHP	Cody Wood	R/R	6 ft 3 in (1.91 m)	195 lb (88 kg)	Fr	Denver, Colorado
5	OF	Kyle Davis	R/R	6 ft 0 in (1.83 m)	195 lb (88 kg)	Jr	Cincinnati, Ohio
6	RHP	Riley Troutt	R/R	5 ft 9 in (1.75 m)	175 lb (79 kg)	Fr	Bartow, Florida
7	RHP	Frank Vesuvio	R/R	5 ft 10 in (1.78 m)	170 lb (77 kg)	Fr	Armonk, New York
8	RHP	Shane Ennis	R/R	6 ft 2 in (1.88 m)	200 lb (91 kg)	Jr	Romney, West Virginia
9	INF	Kyle Gray	L/R	5 ft 10 in (1.78 m)	175 lb (79 kg)	So	Blanco, Texas
10	RHP	Conner Dotson	R/R	6 ft 4 in (1.93 m)	210 lb (95 kg)	Jr	Flower Mound, Texas
12	OF	TJ Lake	R/R	6 ft 1 in (1.85 m)	185 lb (84 kg)	Fr	Toledo, Ohio
13	INF	Jackson Cramer	L/R	6 ft 4 in (1.93 m)	230 lb (104 kg)	Sr	Coppell, Texas
15	RHP	Endy Morales	R/R	6 ft 0 in (1.83 m)	218 lb (99 kg)	So	Holyoke, Massachusetts
16	RHP	Ryan McDonald	R/R	6 ft 7 in (2.01 m)	215 lb (98 kg)	Fr	Las Vegas, Nevada
22	RHP	Tanner Campbell	R/R	6 ft 1 in (1.85 m)	170 lb (77 kg)	So	DeLeon Springs, Florida
23	INF	Kevin Brophy	L/R	6 ft 3 in (1.91 m)	215 lb (98 kg)	Fr	Randolph, New Jersey
24	C	Chase Illig	S/R	6 ft 0 in (1.83 m)	210 lb (95 kg)	Fr	Bluefield, West Virginia
25	INF	Marques Inman	R/R	6 ft 1 in (1.85 m)	215 lb (98 kg)	So	Elyria, Ohio
26	INF	Braden Zarbnisky	L/R	6 ft 3 in (1.91 m)	185 lb (84 kg)	So	Marietta, Georgia
27	OF	Gibson Krzeminski	R/R	5 ft 11 in (1.8 m)	200 lb (91 kg)	Fr	Tecumseh, Ontario
28	INF	Cole Austin	R/R	6 ft 1 in (1.85 m)	185 lb (84 kg)	So	Kennesaw, Georgia
29	LHP	Phillip Ahern	L/L	6 ft 1 in (1.85 m)	180 lb (82 kg)	Fr	Austin, Texas
30	OF	Zach Miller	R/R	6 ft 4 in (1.93 m)	185 lb (84 kg)	Fr	Lawrenceville, Georgia
31	OF	Darius Hill	L/R	6 ft 1 in (1.85 m)	190 lb (86 kg)	So	Dallas, Texas
32	C	Ivan Gonzalez	R/R	5 ft 9 in (1.75 m)	190 lb (86 kg)	So	Round Rock, Texas
33	RHP	BJ Myers	R/R	6 ft 0 in (1.83 m)	195 lb (88 kg)	Jr	Flower Mound, Texas
34	RHP	Jackson Sigman	R/R	6 ft 2 in (1.88 m)	200 lb (91 kg)	Sr	Austin, Texas
37	C	Nick Denicola	R/R	6 ft 0 in (1.83 m)	210 lb (95 kg)	Fr	East Hanover, New Jersey
40	RHP	Jacob Potock	R/R	6 ft 5 in (1.96 m)	250 lb (113 kg)	So	Glenshaw, Pennsylvania
41	INF	Isaiah Kearns	R/R	6 ft 1 in (1.85 m)	195 lb (88 kg)	Fr	Lewistown, Pennsylvania
42	RHP	Sam Kessler	R/R	6 ft 1 in (1.85 m)	192 lb (87 kg)	Fr	Mount Sinai, New York
43	RHP	Kade Strowd	R/R	6 ft 2 in (1.88 m)	175 lb (79 kg)	Fr	Fort Worth, Texas
44	RHP	Carter Camp	R/R	6 ft 5 in (1.96 m)	215 lb (98 kg)	Fr	McKinney, Texas
45	INF	Andrew Zitel	R/R	6 ft 2 in (1.88 m)	207 lb (94 kg)	So	Hillsborough, New Jersey
46	OF	Brandon White	R/R	5 ft 11 in (1.8 m)	160 lb (73 kg)	Fr	Winter Springs, Florida
47	RHP	Alek Manoah	R/R	6 ft 6 in (1.98 m)	260 lb (118 kg)	Fr	Miami, Florida

Head coach

{{{head_coach}}}

Assistant coach(es)

{{{asst_coach}}}

Legend

- (C) Team captain
- (S) Suspended
- (I) Ineligible
- Injured
- Current redshirt
