= 2017 Lamar Cardinals baseball team =

American college baseball season

2017 Lamar Cardinals baseball
- Conference: Southland Conference
- Record: 33–25 (16–14 SLC)
- Head coach: Will Davis (1st season)
- Assistant coaches: Scott Hatten; Jon Phillips
- Home stadium: Vincent–Beck Stadium

2017 Southland Conference baseball standings
	Conf.						Overall
Team	W		L		T	PCT	W		L		T	PCT
McNeese State ‍†‍‍	22	–	8	–	0	.733	37	–	20	–	0	.649
Southeastern Louisiana ‍‍‍^{y}	20	–	10	–	0	.667	37	–	22	–	0	.627
No. 14 Sam Houston State ‍‍‡‍^{y}	19	–	11	–	0	.633	44	–	23	–	0	.657
Houston Baptist ‍‍‍	18	–	12	–	0	.600	29	–	25	–	0	.537
Central Arkansas ‍‍‍	17	–	13	–	0	.567	34	–	26	–	0	.567
Stephen F. Austin ‍‍‍	17	–	13	–	0	.567	29	–	28	–	0	.509
Lamar ‍‍‍	16	–	14	–	0	.533	33	–	25	–	0	.569
New Orleans ‍‍‍	16	–	14	–	0	.533	30	–	28	–	1	.517
Nicholls State ‍‍‍	15	–	15	–	0	.500	29	–	27	–	0	.518
Texas A&M–Corpus Christi ‍‍‍	14	–	16	–	0	.467	22	–	32	–	0	.407
Northwestern State ‍‍‍	10	–	20	–	0	.333	20	–	34	–	0	.370
Incarnate Word * ‍‍‍	8	–	22	–	0	.267	20	–	36	–	0	.357
Abilene Christian * ‍‍‍	3	–	27	–	0	.100	13	–	43	–	0	.232
† – Conference champion ‡ – Tournament champion y – Invited to the NCAA tournament * Ineligible for league and NCAA tournaments due to transition from Division II; Rankings from Collegiate Baseball

The 2017 Lamar Cardinals baseball team represented Lamar University during the 2017 NCAA Division I baseball season as members of the Southland Conference. The Cardinals played their home games at Vincent–Beck Stadium and were led by first–year head coach Will Davis. The team compiled a 33–25 overall record and were 16–14 in conference play for a seventh-place finish. They qualified for the SLC tournament as the number 7 seed. The Cardinals' season ended losing their first two games in the tournament. In the first game, the team lost to #1 seed McNeese State 5–7. Their second game loss was to 4th seed Houston Baptist 5–8.

== Schedule and results ==
Legend
	Lamar win
	Lamar loss
	Postponement/Cancelation/Suspensions
**Bold**	Lamar team member
*	Non-Conference game
†	Make-Up Game

2017 Lamar Cardinals baseball game log
Regular season (33–25)

February (6–3)
Date	Opponent	Rank	Site/stadium	Score	Win	Loss	Save	Attendance	Overall record	SLC Record
Cardinal Classic
Feb. 18	Milwaukee*		Vincent–Beck Stadium • Beaumont, TX	6–0	**Driskill, Tanner (1–0)**	GOODMAN, Elijah (0–1)	None	1,141	1–0	
Feb. 18	Illinois*		Vincent–Beck Stadium • Beaumont, TX	15–9	**Lance, Carson (1–0)**	Bellair, Cole (0–1)	None	1,122	2–0	
Feb. 19	Illinois*		Vincent–Beck Stadium • Beaumont, TX	2–1	**Andrews, Galen (1–0)**	Jones, Zack (0–1)	None		3–0	
Feb. 19	Milwaukee*		Vincent–Beck Stadium • Beaumont, TX	2–1	**Fleischman, Chad (1–0)**	SOMMERS, Jake (0–1)	None	834	4–0	
Feb. 24	Fairfield*		Vincent–Beck Stadium • Beaumont, TX	6–7	Bonaiuto, Mike (1–0)	**Johnson, Jimmy (0–1)**	None	739	4–1	
Feb. 25	Fairfield*		Vincent–Beck Stadium • Beaumont, TX	19–9	**Lance, Carson (1–0)**	O'Connor, Ryan (0–1)	None		5–1	
Feb. 25	Fairfield*		Vincent–Beck Stadium • Beaumont, TX	5–1	**Campbell, Jace (1–0)**	Sacco, David (0–1)	**Johnson, Jimmy (1)**	770	6–1	
Feb. 26	Fairfield*		Vincent–Beck Stadium • Beaumont, TX	2–6	Wallace, Gavin (1–0)	**Gabryszwski, Nathan (0–1)**	None	669	6–2	
Feb. 28	at #21 Texas*		UFCU Disch–Falk Field • Austin, TX	5–9	Kennedy, Nick (1–0)	**Erickson, Ryan (0–1)**	Ridgeway, Beau (1)	4,109	6–3	

March (9–10)
Date	Opponent	Rank	Site/stadium	Score	Win	Loss	Save	Attendance	Overall record	SLC Record
Mar. 3	at UT Rio Grande Valley*		UTRGV Baseball Stadium • Edinburg, TX	1–3	Johnson, Carter (3–0)	**Driskill, Tanner (1–1)**	Acosta, Luis (1)	884	6–4	
Mar. 5	at UT Rio Grande Valley*		UTRGV Baseball Stadium • Edinburg, TX	5–1	**Lance, Carson (3–0)**	Grant, Connor (2–2)	**Andrews, Galen (1)**		7–4	
Mar. 5	at UT Rio Grande Valley*		UTRGV Baseball Stadium • Edinburg, TX	5–6	Douglas, Austin (2–0)	**Johnson, Jimmy (0–2)**	Acosta, Luis (2)	757	7–5	
Mar. 7	Rice*		Vincent–Beck Stadium • Beaumont, TX	10–4	**Janak, Brent (1–0)**	Nick Orewiler (0–1)	None	903	8–5	
Mar. 10	at Sam Houston State		Don Sanders Stadium • Huntsville, TX	4–9	Donica, Heath (3–1)	**Driskill, Tanner (1–2)**	None	802	8–6	0–1
Mar. 11	at Sam Houston State		Don Sanders Stadium • Huntsville, TX	4–6	Mills, Dakota (2–1)	**Campbell, Jace (1–1)**	Mikolajchak, N. (3)	851	8–7	0–2
Mar. 12	at Sam Houston State		Don Sanders Stadium • Huntsville, TX	1–3	Wesneski, Hayden (4–0)	**Lance, Carson (3–1)**	Mikolajchak, N. (4)	854	8–8	0–3
Mar. 14	Prairie View A&M*		Vincent–Beck Stadium • Beaumont, TX	15–7	**Gabryszwski, Nathan (1–1)**	Jordan Johnson (1–2)	None	704	9–8	
Mar. 15	Texas Southern*		Vincent–Beck Stadium • Beaumont, TX	5–2	**Janak, Brent (2–0)**	Jaime Vazquez (0–1)	**Johnson, Jimmy (2)**	744	10–8	
Mar. 17	at Southeastern Louisiana		Pat Kenelly Diamond at Alumni Field • Hammond, LA	5–6	Sceroler, M. (4–0)	**Driskill, Tanner (1–3)**	Green, J. (2)	1,210	10–9	0–4
Mar. 18	at Southeastern Louisiana		Pat Kenelly Diamond at Alumni Field • Hammond, LA	1–4	Gaconi, Corey (2–0)	**Lance, Carson (3–2)**	None	1,151	10–10	0–5
Mar. 18	at Southeastern Louisiana		Pat Kenelly Diamond at Alumni Field • Hammond, LA	13–5	**Johnson, Jimmy (1–2)**	Hileman, Evan (3–1)	None	1,088	11–10	1–5
Mar. 22	Northwestern State*		Vincent–Beck Stadium • Beaumont, TX	12–6	**Andrews, Galen (2–0)**	Hlad, Dan (0–2)	None	712	12–10	
Mar. 24	Incarnate Word		Vincent–Beck Stadium • Beaumont, TX	9–6	**Lance, Carson (4–2)**	Lesley, Tyler (0–3)	**Driskill, Tanner (1)**	602	13–10	2–5
Mar. 25	Incarnate Word		Vincent–Beck Stadium • Beaumont, TX	3–1	**Johnson, Jimmy (2–2)**	Moszkowicz, Lance (2–1)	None	724	14–10	3–5
Mar. 26	Incarnate Word		Vincent–Beck Stadium • Beaumont, TX	5–2	**Driskill, Tanner (2–3)**	Shull, John (2–3)	None	769	15–10	4–5
Mar. 28	at Northwestern State*		H. Alvin Brown–C. C. Stroud Field • Natchitoches, LA	9–11	Bear, Devin (2–0)	Janak, Brent (2–1)	None	508	15–11	
Mar. 31	Houston Baptist		Vincent–Beck Stadium • Beaumont, TX	2–7	Russ, Addison (1–2)	**Lance, Carson (4–3)**	None		15–12	4–6
Mar. 31	Houston Baptist		Vincent–Beck Stadium • Beaumont, TX	1–2	Thames, Christian (2–3)	**Johnson, Jimmy (2–3)**	Newton, JT (3)	806	15–13	4–7

April (11–6)
Date	Opponent	Rank	Site/stadium	Score	Win	Loss	Save	Attendance	Overall record	SLC Record
Apr. 1	Houston Baptist		Vincent–Beck Stadium • Beaumont, TX	2–7	Russ, Addison (1–2)	**Lance, Carson (4–3)**	None		15–14	4–8
Apr. 5	at Baylor*		Baylor Ballpark • Waco, TX	11–1	**Johnson, Ryan (1–0)**	Phillips (3–2)	None	2,028	16–14	
Apr. 7	at New Orleans		Maestri Field at Privateer Park • New Orleans, LA	0–2	Semple, Shawn (5–1)	**Lance, Carson (4–4)**	Martin, Reeves (2)	274	16–15	4–9
Apr. 8	at New Orleans		Maestri Field at Privateer Park • New Orleans, LA	0–6	Warzek, Bryan (5–0)	**Johnson, Jimmy (2–4)**	None	227	16–16	4–10
Apr. 9	at New Orleans		Maestri Field at Privateer Park • New Orleans, LA	9–1	**Campbell, Jace (2–1)**	DeMayo, C. (0–5)	None	209	17–16	5–10
Apr. 11	Grambling State		Vincent–Beck Stadium • Beaumont, TX	11–2	**Brown, Brett (1–0)**	Devin Washington (0–1)	None	541	18–16	
Apr. 13	Texas A&M–Corpus Christi		Vincent–Beck Stadium • Beaumont, TX	4–2	**Lance, Carson (5–4)**	Romere, Chad (1–1)	None	649	19–16	6–10
Apr. 14	Texas A&M–Corpus Christi		Vincent–Beck Stadium • Beaumont, TX	8–2	**Johnson, Jimmy (3–4)**	Carter, Cole (3–5)	None	882	20–16	7–10
Apr. 15	Texas A&M–Corpus Christi		Vincent–Beck Stadium • Beaumont, TX	6–4	**Campbell, Jace (3–1)**	Skapura, Devin (1–4)	**Driskill, Tanner (2)**	741	21–16	8–10
Apr. 18	at #8 LSU*		Alex Box Stadium, Skip Bertman Field • Baton Rouge, LA	4–10	Gilbert (2–1)	**Johnson, Ryan (1–1)**	None	10,603	21–17	
Apr. 21	at Abilene Christian		Crutcher Scott Field • Abilene, TX	17–11	**Lance, Carson (6–4)**	Caleb Dougherty (0–2)	None	375	22–17	9–10
Apr. 22	at Abilene Christian		Crutcher Scott Field • Abilene, TX	13–8	**Johnson, Jimmy (4–4)**	Zach Kornely (0–2)	**Driskill, Tanner (3)**	350	23–17	10–10
Apr. 23	at Abilene Christian		Crutcher Scott Field • Abilene, TX	0–9	Keaton Brewer (1–2)	**Campbell, Jace (3–2**)	Jonah Smith (1)	475	23–18	10–11
Apr. 25	Texas Southern*		Vincent–Beck Stadium • Beaumont, TX	3–2	**Johnson, Ryan (2–1)**	Ryan Hawkins (0–6)	**Driskill, Tanner (4)**	587	24–18	
Apr. 28	Nicholls		Vincent–Beck Stadium • Beaumont, TX	0–2	Stapler, Cole (5–5)	**Lance, Carson (6–5)**	Tarver, Adam (6)		24–19	11–11
Apr. 28	Nicholls		Vincent–Beck Stadium • Beaumont, TX	7–5	**Johnson, Jimmy (5–4)**	Ernestine, Alex (1–3)	**Driskill, Tanner (5)**		25–19	12–11
Apr. 30	Nicholls		Vincent–Beck Stadium • Beaumont, TX	4–5	Hanchar, Mike (3–3)	**Campbell, Jace (3–2)**	Tarver, Adam (7)		26–19	12–12

May (7–4)
Date	Opponent	Rank	Site/stadium	Score	Win	Loss	Save	Attendance	Overall record	SLC Record
May 3	at Rice*		Reckling Park • Houston, TX	8–9	Moss (2–1)	**Campbell, Jace (3–4)**	None	2,042	26–20	
May 5	at Oklahoma State*		Allie P. Reynolds Stadium • Stillwater, OK	5–6	Cobb (1–0)	**Brown, Brett (1–1)**	None	1,348	26–21	
May 6	at Oklahoma State*		Allie P. Reynolds Stadium • Stillwater, OK	7–6	**Driskill, Tanner (4–3)**	Lienhard (2–1)	None	1,443	27–21	
May 7	at Oklahoma State*		Allie P. Reynolds Stadium • Stillwater, OK	6–2	**Johnson, Ryan (3–1)**	Battenfield (2–4)	**Cawthon, Ryan (1)**	1,406	28–21	
May 10	at Southern*		Lee–Hines Field • Baton Rouge, LA	10–1	**Cawthon, Ryan (1–0)**	Snyder, J. (3–2)	None	56	29–21	
May 12	Stephen F. Austin		Vincent–Beck Stadium • Beaumont, TX	10–5	**Lance, Carson (7–5)**	Ledet, Patrick (6–5)	None	887	30–21	13–12
May 13	Stephen F. Austin		Vincent–Beck Stadium • Beaumont, TX	14–8	**Andrews, Galen (3–0)**	Kiminski, Trevor (3–4)	None	959	31–21	14–12
May 14	Stephen F. Austin		Vincent–Beck Stadium • Beaumont, TX	9–4	**Johnson, Jimmy (6–4)**	Nouis, Erik (2–4)	None	776	32–21	15–12
May 18	at #28 McNeese		Joe Miller Ballpark • Lake Charles, LA	2–10	Sanders, Austin (7–2)	**Sanders, Austin (7–2)**	None	1,179	32–22	15–13
May 19	at #28 McNeese		Joe Miller Ballpark • Lake Charles, LA	4–1	**Campbell, Jace (4–4)**	Deaton, Rhett (8–3)	**Driskill, Tanner (6)**	1,141	33–22	16–13
May 19	at #28 McNeese		Joe Miller Ballpark • Lake Charles, LA	6–16 (7 inn)	Anderson, Grant (7–0)	**Johnson, Jimmy (6–5)**	None	874	33–23	16–14

Postseason ( 0–2 )

Southland Conference Tournament ( 0–2 )
Date	Opponent	(Seed)/Rank	Site/stadium	Score	Win	Loss	Save	Attendance	Overall record	Tournament record
May 24	vs. (1) McNeese State	(7)	Constellation Field; Sugar Land, TX	5–7	Anderson, Grant (8–0)	**Lance, Carson (7–7)**	Kober, Collin (9)		33–24	0–1
May 25	vs. (4) Houston Baptist	(7)	Constellation Field; Sugar Land, TX	5–8	Newton, JT (7–0)	**Johnson, Jimmy (6–6)**	None		33–25	0–2

Legend: = Win = Loss = Canceled
Bold = Lamar team member
Rankings are based on the team's current ranking in the D1Baseball poll.
