= Luken Baker =

American baseball player (born 1997)

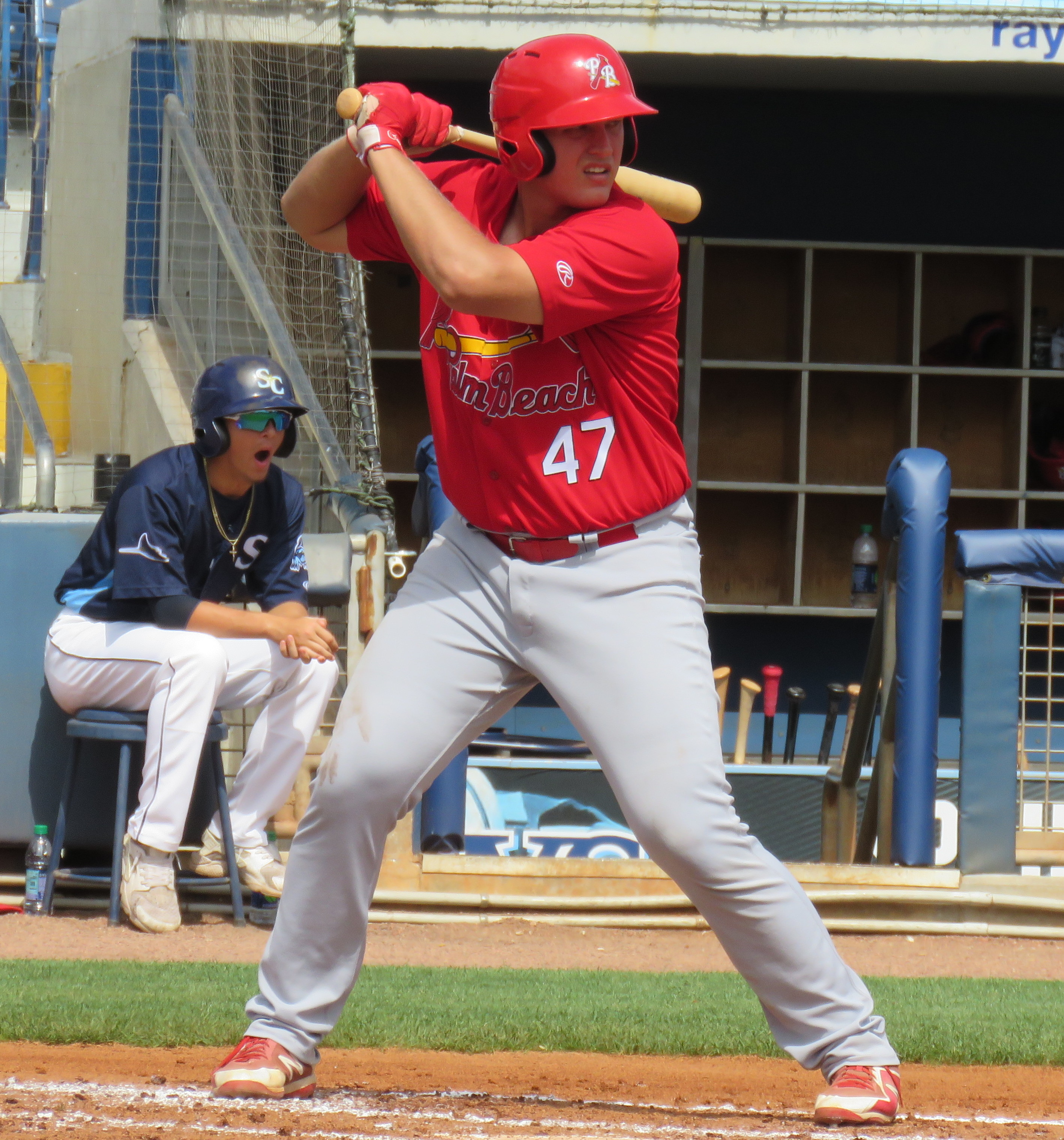
- Baker with the Palm Beach Cardinals in 2019

Kansas City Monarchs – No. 33
- First baseman
- Born: March 10, 1997 (age 29); Spring, Texas, U.S.
- Bats: Right Throws: Right

MLB debut
- June 4, 2023, for the St. Louis Cardinals

MLB statistics (through April 12, 2026)
- Batting average: .205
- Home runs: 4
- Runs batted in: 22
- Stats at Baseball Reference

Teams
- St. Louis Cardinals (2023–2025); Arizona Diamondbacks (2026)

Luken Grosvenor Baker (born March 10, 1997) is an American professional baseball first baseman for the Kansas City Monarchs of the American Association of Professional Baseball. He has previously played in Major League Baseball (MLB) for the St. Louis Cardinals and the Arizona Diamondbacks.

== Amateur career ==
Baker attended Oak Ridge High School in Conroe, Texas, alongside Durbin Feltman. In July 2014, he won the Junior Home Run Derby at Target Field. He later won the Home Run Derby at the Under Armour All-America Baseball Game. As a senior, he was named the Gatorade Baseball Player of the Year.

Baker was considered an early round prospect for the 2015 Major League Baseball draft, but emailed major league teams telling them that he would not sign and would instead attend Texas Christian University (TCU) to play college baseball for the TCU Horned Frogs. The Houston Astros still selected him in the 37th round that same year, and he did not sign, enrolling at TCU.

In 2016, as a freshman at TCU, Baker was named the Big 12 Conference's Freshman of the Year. He started all 67 of TCU's games, batting .379 with 11 home runs and 62 RBIs. As a sophomore in 2017, Baker played 47 games before he suffered a left arm injury during a collision at first base that ended his season. In those 47 games, he batted .317 with eight home runs and 41 RBIs, earning him a spot on the All-Big 12 Second Team. Baker returned healthy in 2018 for his junior season, but his season was cut short again after 31 games after he fractured his left fibula and tore a ligament during a slide, requiring season-ending surgery.

== Professional career ==
=== St. Louis Cardinals ===
The St. Louis Cardinals selected Baker in the second round, with the 75th overall pick, in the 2018 Major League Baseball draft and signed with them for $800,000. He made his professional debut with the Gulf Coast League Cardinals, and, after batting .500 in eight games, and was promoted to the Peoria Chiefs. In 37 games for the Chiefs to finish the season, he hit .288 with three home runs and 15 RBIs.

Baker spent the 2019 season with the Palm Beach Cardinals. After hitting .346 with four home runs and a 1.067 OPS in the month of August, he earned Florida State League Player of the Month honors. He finished the year slashing .244/.327/.390 with ten home runs and 53 RBIs over 122 games. Baker did not play in a game in 2020 due to the cancellation of the minor league season because of the COVID-19 pandemic.

Baker was assigned to the Springfield Cardinals to begin the 2021 season. He missed nearly all of August and the beginning of September while on the injured list. Over 91 games for Springfield, Baker slashed .248/.322/.530 with 26 home runs and 68 RBIs. In mid-September, he was promoted to the Memphis Redbirds of the Triple-A East with whom he appeared in two games to end the season.

Baker returned to Memphis to begin the 2022 season and in 124 contests, he slashed .228/.289/.394 with 21 home runs and 66 RBIs. The Cardinals again assigned Baker to Memphis to begin the 2023 season, where in 54 games, he batted .313/.434/.641 with 18 home runs and 53 RBIs.

On June 4, 2023, Baker was selected to the 40-man roster and promoted to the major leagues for the first time, where he was slotted into the starting lineup as the designated hitter, batting seventh against the Pittsburgh Pirates. He had two hits in four at-bats in his debut game, with his first MLB hit coming in his first career at-bat, off Rich Hill. In 33 games during his rookie campaign, Baker hit .209/.313/.314 with two home runs and 10 RBI. After the season, he won the International League Most Valuable Player Award.

Baker spent most of 2024 with Memphis, hitting .231 in 109 games with 32 homers and 79 RBI. He also played in 21 games in the majors, batting .175 with two homers and 10 RBI. In 2025, he played in 62 games for Memphis and 19 in St. Louis, with a .235 average in the minors and a .196 average in the majors.

=== Los Angeles Dodgers ===
On August 4, 2025, Baker was claimed off waivers by the Los Angeles Dodgers. After playing just one game for the Triple-A Oklahoma City Comets, he was designated for assignment on August 8. Baker cleared waivers and was sent outright to Oklahoma City on August 10. In 33 games, he batted .273 with eight home runs and 22 RBI. Baker elected free agency following the season on November 6.

=== Arizona Diamondbacks ===
On December 26, 2025, Baker signed a minor league contract with the Arizona Diamondbacks. Baker began the regular season with the Reno Aces and was promoted to the major leagues on April 7, 2026. In three appearances for Arizona, he went 1-for-5 (.200). On April 18, Baker was designated for assignment by the Diamondbacks following Lourdes Gurriel Jr.'s return from the injured list. He cleared waivers and was sent outright to Triple-A Reno on April 20. Baker elected free agency the same day. On April 23, he re-signed with Arizona on a minor league contract. In 51 total games for the Aces, he batted .218/.327/.352 with three home runs and 20 RBI. On June 15, 2026, Baker was released by the Diamondbacks organization.

=== Kansas City Monarchs ===
On June 30, 2026, Baker signed with the Kansas City Monarchs of the American Association of Professional Baseball.
