= Durbin Feltman =

American baseball player (born 1997)

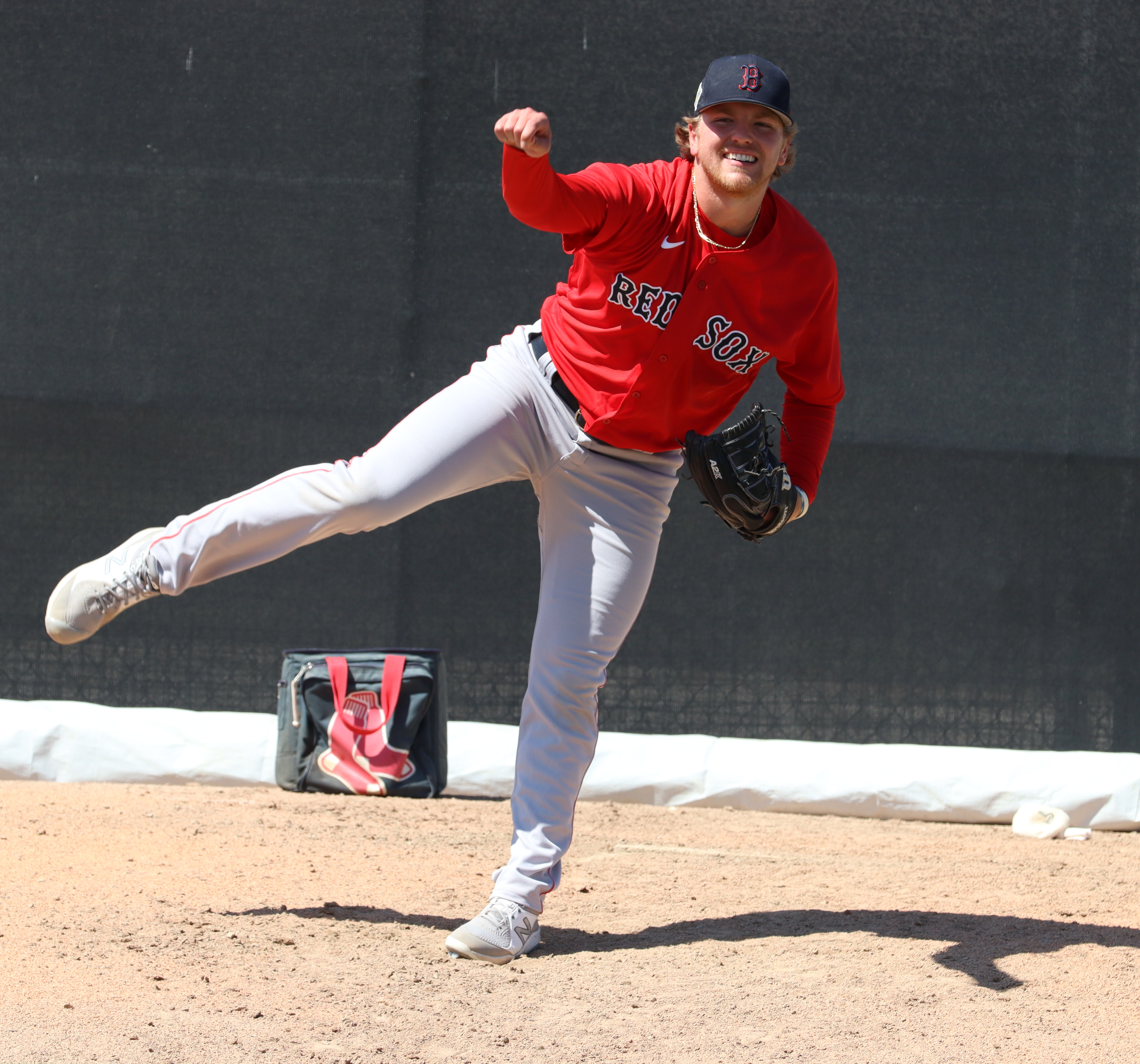
- Feltman during spring training in 2022

Kansas City Monarchs – No. 43
- Pitcher
- Born: April 18, 1997 (age 29); Conroe, Texas, U.S.
- Bats: Right Throws: Right
- Stats at Baseball Reference

Durbin Sanders Feltman (born April 18, 1997) is an American professional baseball pitcher for the Kansas City Monarchs of the American Association of Professional Baseball. He played college baseball for the TCU Horned Frogs.

== Amateur career ==
Feltman attended and graduated from Oak Ridge High School in Conroe, Texas, alongside Luken Baker. In high school, he was a catcher, and only began pitching prior to his senior year. He was not drafted out of high school in the 2015 Major League Baseball draft and he enrolled at Texas Christian University (TCU) to play college baseball for the TCU Horned Frogs baseball team.

In 2016, as a freshman at TCU, Feltman was tied for first in the Big 12 Conference with nine saves. In 34 2/3 innings pitched in relief, he struck out 49 and compiled a 3–0 record and 1.56 earned run average (ERA). He was named to the All-Big 12 Freshman Team. As a sophomore in 2017, he made 29 relief appearances, going 2–2 with a 3.64 ERA with a TCU record 17 saves. He played in the Cape Cod Baseball League for the Falmouth Commodores that summer. As a junior in 2018, Feltman posted a 0.74 ERA and six saves with 43 strikeouts in 24 2/3 innings pitched. He missed nearly a month during the season due to injury. He was named to the All-Big 12 First Team.

== Professional career ==
=== Boston Red Sox ===
Feltman was considered one of the top prospects for the 2018 Major League Baseball draft. He was selected in the third round, with the 100th overall pick, by the Boston Red Sox. Feltman signed with the Red Sox on June 14. He was assigned to the Low-A Lowell Spinners, and made his professional debut on June 29. He made four appearances with Lowell, not allowing a hit or walk in four innings, while striking out seven. On July 10, Feltman was promoted to the Single-A Greenville Drive, where he made seven one-inning appearances, compiling a 2.57 ERA while striking out 14 and walking one. With Greenville, Feltman pitched in a combined no-hitter with Enmanuel De Jesus and Devon Fisher. On August 1, Feltman was promoted to the High-A Salem Red Sox, where he finished the season. In 12 1/3 relief innings pitched, he posted a 2.19 ERA and struck out 15 batters.

Feltman spent 2019 with the Portland Sea Dogs of the Double-A Eastern League, going 2–3 with a 5.26 ERA over 43 relief appearances, striking out 54 over 51 1/3 innings. After the 2020 minor league season was cancelled due to the COVID-19 pandemic, Feltman was invited to participate in the Red Sox' fall instructional league. To begin the 2021 season, he returned to Portland (now members of the Double-A Northeast), and was promoted to the Worcester Red Sox of the Triple-A East in late July. Over 39 relief appearances between the two clubs, Feltman went 8–1 with a 2.96 ERA and 62 strikeouts over 51 2/3 innings. He was named Boston's minor-league reliever of the year. He returned to Worcester for the 2022 season. Over 40 relief appearances, he went 3-5 with a 7.63 ERA, 24 walks, and 56 strikeouts over 48 1/3 innings.

Feltman made two appearances for Worcester in 2023, striking out four while allowing two runs in 2 2/3 innings pitched. He was released by the Red Sox organization on April 11.

=== Oakland Athletics ===
On April 18, 2023, Feltman signed a minor league contract with the Oakland Athletics organization and was assigned to the Double-A Midland RockHounds. In 21 games for Midland, he posted a 5–1 record and 2.89 ERA with 40 strikeouts and 2 saves in 37 1/3 innings of work. Feltman elected free agency on November 6.

=== Lexington Legends ===
On March 14, 2025, Feltman signed with the Lexington Legends of the Atlantic League of Professional Baseball. In 11 appearances for Lexington, he struggled to a 10.13 ERA with eight strikeouts and six saves across 10 2/3 innings pitched. On June 25, Feltman was released by the Legends.

=== Staten Island FerryHawks ===
On July 2, 2025, Feltman signed with the Staten Island FerryHawks of the Atlantic League of Professional Baseball. He made 20 appearances for Staten Island, compiling a 1-0 record and 4.91 ERA with 16 strikeouts and one save across 18 1/3 innings of relief. Feltman became a free agent following the season.

=== Kansas City Monarchs ===
On April 27, 2026, Feltman signed with the Kansas City Monarchs of the American Association of Professional Baseball. He had a 2.08 ERA, 20 strikeouts and six saves across 13 innings with the team.

=== St. Louis Cardinals ===
On July 8, 2026, Feltman's contract was purchased by the St. Louis Cardinals. He made six appearances for the Triple–A Memphis Redbirds, recording a 5.68 ERA with 10 strikeouts across 6 1/3 innings of relief. Feltman was released by the Cardinals organization on August 4.

=== Kansas City Monarchs (second stint) ===
On August 8, 2026, Feltman signed back to play with the Kansas City Monarchs of the American Association of Professional Baseball.
